= Curaçaoans in the Netherlands =

Curaçaoans in the Netherlands Curaçaoënaars in Nederland
Total population
- 144,814 (2023)

Languages
- Dutch, Papiamentu

Religion
- Christianity

Curaçaoans in the Netherlands (Dutch: Curaçaoënaars in Nederland) are migrants from Curaçao to the Netherlands and their descendants. Until 2010, Curaçao formed part of the Netherlands Antilles and became a constituent country within the Kingdom of the Netherlands after its dissolution. As of 2023, figures from Statistics Netherlands showed 144,814 people of Curaçaoan origin in the Netherlands, with Curaçaoans forming the majority of Dutch Caribbean migrants to the Netherlands. Rotterdam has the largest Curaçaoan community with around 23,000 people of Curaçaoan descent. Large Curaçaoan communities can also be found in Amsterdam, Tilburg, Almere and The Hague.

== Notable people ==
- Patrick van Aanholt, football player
- Vurnon Anita, football player
- Jandino Asporaat, comedian
- Liemarvin Bonevacia, sprinter
- Enith Brigitha, swimmer
- Izaline Calister, singer
- Daisy Dee, singer, actress and TV host
- Hubert Fermina, politician
- Didi Gregorius, baseball player
- Rangelo Janga, football player
- Kenley Jansen, baseball player
- Andruw Jones, baseball player
- Kempi, rapper
- D'Angelo Marshall, kickboxer
- Churandy Martina, sprinter
- Hensley Meulens, baseball player
- Cynthia Ortega, politician
- Jordann Pikeur, kickboxer
- Endy Semeleer, kickboxer
- Sherman Smith (musician)
- Jurriën Timber, football player
- Quinten Timber, football player
- Gregory van der Wiel, football player
- Jetro Willems, football player
- Errol Zimmerman, kickboxer
