= Mladen Brestovac =

Croatian heavyweight Muay Thai kickboxer

- Born: 27 October 1983 (age 42); Zagreb, Yugoslavia
- Other names: The Scorpion Sting
- Nationality: Croatia
- Height: 1.98 m (6 ft 6 in)
- Weight: 116.9 kg (258 lb; 18.41 st)
- Division: Heavyweight
- Reach: 80 in (203 cm)
- Style: Kickboxing, Muay Thai
- Stance: Southpaw
- Fighting out of: Zagreb, Croatia
- Team: Spartan Gym
- Trainer: Aleksandar Pupac
- Years active: 2002 – present

Kickboxing record
- Total: 71
- Wins: 58
- By knockout: 38
- Losses: 12
- By knockout: 5
- Draws: 1

Other information
- University: Faculty of Economics & Business, University of Zagreb

Mladen Brestovac (born October 1983) is a Croatian heavyweight Muay Thai kickboxer, currently signed to Final Fight Championship, where he is the current FFC Heavyweight champion, and GLORY. He previously competed in K-1 and SUPERKOMBAT.

He was named Croatian K-1 Fighter of the Year in 2013 by a jury of experts made of Fight Channel members, kickboxing coaches and sports journalists. Mirko Filipović, as one of the best Croatian kickboxers of all time, was out of competition.

Combat Press has ranked him the #6 heavyweight in the world between December 2019 and January 2021. He has continually been ranked in the heavyweight top ten by Combat Press since December 2016.

== Career ==
=== K-1 ===
Brestovac participated in the 2008 K-1 Fighting Network Austria tournament. He achieved stoppage victories against Andreas Peters in the quarterfinal and Renato Sini in the semifinal, before winning the tournament through a unanimous decision against Roman Kleibl in the final.

After winning the tournament, Brestovac had three fights in the regional circuit, scoring knockouts of Armin Zahirović, Janos Rafief-Arifov and Attila Mathe, before taking part in the 2009 K-1 Rules Tournament in Budapest. He won a unanimous decision against Joachim Thomas in the quarterfinal, knocked Máté Zentai out with a head kick in the semifinal and won the tournament with an extra round decision against Sebastian Ciobanu. In his next fight he won the K-1 ColliZion 2009 Mladá Boleslav tournament, despite winning only the semifinal bout Libor Polách, as the other finalist, Lubomir Šuda, was unable to fight due to an injury.

In October 2014, Brestovac defeated Koos Wessels by unanimous decision, to qualify to the 2009 K-1 ColliZion Final Tournament. Brestovac scored knockouts of Mihaiţă Golescu in the quarterfinal and Coco Rus in the semifinal, before facing Roman Kleibl in the final. The final went into two extra rounds, before Kleibl won the decision.

Brestovac then went on a 4–0–1 run, notably defeating Jan Soukup and winning the rematch with Roman Kleibl.

=== SUPERKOMBAT ===
He subsequently signed with SUPERKOMBAT, and was immediately placed in the 2011 SUPERKOMBAT World Grand Prix II. He defeated Mighty Mo by a body kick KO in the semifinals, but lost the final bout against Ismael Londt by TKO, after the ringside doctor stopped the fight in the first round.

After a TKO win against Mourad Bouzidi, in March 2012, Brestovac fought the first match, of what would be their trilogy, against Benjamin Adegbuyi. Adegbuyi won the semifinal bout of the 2012 SUPERKOMBAT World Grand Prix III by unanimous decision.

Brestovac was scheduled to fight Chinese giant Taishan in a non-tournament bout at the K-1 World Grand Prix 2012 Final in Zagreb, Croatia on 15 March 2013. However Taishan was replaced, and Brestovac defeated Frank Muñoz via unanimous decision.

=== GLORY and FFC debuts ===
He took unanimous decision win against Sergei Lascenko, after being the better and more active fighter during the fight. Brestovac achieved effective damage with punch&kick combinations, with his left kick doing lots of damage to Lascenko's body. Lascenko, who replaced Michael Duut, had moments of danger during the fight, but not enough to take the victory. The fight was held at the Final Fight Championship 3 event in Zadar, Croatia on 10 May 2013. He beat Ali Cenik by decision at Final Fight Championship 8 in Zagreb, Croatia on 25 October 2013.

In November 2013 Brestovac signed for world top promotion, Glory. He made his debut in his hometown Zagreb at the Glory 14: Zagreb event facing Jahfarr Wilnis, defeating him with left high kick in the first round.

He defeated Tomas Pakutinskas at FFC Futures 2 on 5 May 2014, after he suffered arm injury early in round one. Tomas was late replacement for Wiesław Kwaśniewski. He fought, on 24 June 2014, in Slovenia against Tomaž Simonič, who replaced Nikolai Falin. Brestovac scored another victory on points, scoring a knockdown in third round with a flying knee. He was next scheduled to fight Nikolaj Falin in June 2014, but Falin would later withdraw and be replaced by Tomaž Simonič. He defeated Simonič by unanimous decision. Returning to FFC, he scored a TKO win against Luca Panto, who suffered an arm injury in the first round.

He became the La Nuit Des Champions K-1 rules heavyweight +100 kg champion by defeating Nicolas Wamba on 22 November 2014, in Marseille, France. Wamba was counted two times before end of second round, when his corner threw towel because of injury.

=== FFC and GLORY title fights ===
Brestovac fought Wiesław Kwaśniewski at FFC: Super Final for the vacant FFC Heavyweight title. He defeated Kwaśniewski by a second-round TKO. He was scheduled to defend his title four months later, against Colin George. Brestovac won the fight just 27 seconds into the fight, breaking George's arm as he tried to block a body kick.

He was supposed to replace Benjamin Adegbuyi to fight Anderson Silva on 8 May 2015, at Glory 21: San Diego event, however the Brazilian failed hus medical test and that fight was cancelled. He instead took part in the 2015 Glory Heavyweight Contender tournament, fighting Benjamin Adegbuyi in the semifinals. Adegbuyi won the fight by TKO, dropping Brestovac trice in the third round.

Following his first loss in over three years, Brestovac was scheduled to defend his NDC title against Fabrice Aurieng in November 2015. Aurieng won the fight by unanimous decision.

Despite the two fight losing skid, Brestovac was nonetheless scheduled to fight Rico Verhoeven at Glory 28 for the Glory Heavyweight title. Brestovac lost the fight by unanimous decision (49–46, 50–45, and 50–45).

=== FFC title reign and Verhoeven rematch ===
After these three losses, Brestovac defended his FFC title against Steve Banks. Brestovac snapped his losing streak with a second round head kick knockout of Banks.

Brestovac participated in the 2016 Glory Heavyweight Contender tournament, being scheduled to fight Jahfarr Wilnis in the semifinals. He knocked Wilnis out with a head kick in the first round, and advanced to the finals, where he was to fight a rematch with Benjamin Adegbuyi. Adegbuyi won the fight by unanimous decision.

He was scheduled to defend the FFC title for the second time against Daniel Lentie at FFC 27. Brestovac won the fight by unanimous decision. He then defended his title for the third time against Dževad Poturak at FFC 29, winning by unanimous decision.

After two consecutive title defenses, Brestovac fought Hesdy Gerges at Glory 45. He knocked Gerges out with a head kick, after 36 seconds of the first round. He then challenged Rico Verhoeven at Glory 54 for the second time, but would once again lose by unanimous decision with 50–45 on all five scorecards.

He defended the FFC title for the fourth time against Jhonata Diniz at FFC 31, who he knocked out with a head kick in the third round.

=== 2019 doping suspension ===
Brestovac wouldn't fight in 2019, as in January of the same year, it was announced by GLORY that Brestovac was one of four fighters to have failed their doping tests, testing positive for meldonium. He was given a 19-month suspension, applied retroactively from the Glory 54 event, which effectively ended on 1 December 2019.

Brestovac faced Karim Dian at Glory 95 for a retirement bout on 21 September 2024. He won by first-round KO with a left body kick.

== Titles ==
=== Professional competition ===
- Final Fight Championship
  - FFC Heavyweight Championship (one time, current) (5 Title Def.)
- Glory
  - 2016 Glory Heavyweight (+95 kg/209.4 lb) Contender Tournament runner-up
- Nuit des Champions
  - 2014 NDC K-1 Rules Heavyweight +100 kg Champion
- SUPERKOMBAT Fighting Championship
  - 2011 SUPERKOMBAT World Grand Prix II runner-up
- K-1
  - 2009 K-1 ColliZion 2009 Final Tournament runner-up
  - 2009 K-1 ColliZion 2009 Mladá Boleslav Tournament Champion
  - 2009 K-1 Rules Tournament in Budapest Champion
  - 2008 K-1 Vienna Tournament Champion

=== Accolades ===
- 2013 Croatian K-1 Fighter of the Year

== Kickboxing record ==
Kickboxing record
56 wins (38 (T)KOs, 16 decisions), 14 losses (5 (T)KOs, 9 decisions), 1 draw
Date	Result	Opponent	Event	Location	Method	Round	Time
2024-09-21	Win	(France) Karim Dian	Glory 95	Zagreb, Croatia	KO (left body kick)	1	1:13
2018-10-12	Win	(Brazil) Jhonata Diniz	FFC 31: Las Vegas	Las Vegas, Nevada	KO (left high kick)	3	1:36
Defends FFC Heavyweight Championship.
2018-06-02	Loss	(Netherlands) Rico Verhoeven	Glory 54: Birmingham	Birmingham, England	Decision (unanimous)	5	3:00
For the Glory Heavyweight Championship.
2017-09-30	Win	(Netherlands) Hesdy Gerges	Glory 45: Amsterdam	Amsterdam, Netherlands	KO (left high kick)	1	0:36
2017-04-22	Win	(Bosnia and Herzegovina) Dževad Poturak	FFC 29	Ljubljana, Slovenia	Decision (unanimous)	3	3:00
Defends FFC Heavyweight Championship.
2016-12-17	Win	(Cameroon) Daniel Lentie	FFC 27: Night of Champions	Zagreb, Croatia	Decision (unanimous)	3	3:00
Defends FFC Heavyweight Championship.
2016-11-05	Loss	(Romania) Benjamin Adegbuyi	Glory 35: Nice, Final	Nice, France	Decision (unanimous)	3	3:00
For the Glory Heavyweight Contender Tournament.
2016-11-05	Win	(Netherlands) Jahfarr Wilnis	Glory 35: Nice, Semi Finals	Nice, France	TKO (left high kick)	1	2:06
2016-06-04	Win	(United States) Steve Banks	FFC 24: Villefort vs Rela	Daytona Beach, Florida, USA	TKO (left high kick)	2	2:42
Defended FFC Heavyweight Championship.
2016-03-12	Loss	(Netherlands) Rico Verhoeven	Glory 28: Paris	Paris, France	Decision (unanimous)	5	3:00
For the Glory Heavyweight Championship.
2015-11-14	Loss	(France) Fabrice Aurieng	La 22ème Nuit Des Champions	Marseille, France	Decision	5	3:00
Lost NDC K-1 Rules Heavyweight +100 kg Championship.
2015-10-09	Loss	(Romania) Benjamin Adegbuyi	Glory 24: Denver, Semi Finals	Denver, Colorado, USA	TKO (low kicks)	3	1:47
2015-04-17	Win	(Suriname) Colin George	FFC18: Ljubljana	Ljubljana, Slovenia	TKO (arm injury)	1	0:27
Defends FFC Heavyweight Championship.
2014-12-20	Win	(Poland) Wiesław Kwaśniewski	FFC Super Final	Opatija, Croatia	TKO	2	0:45
Wins the Vacant FFC Heavyweight Championship.
2014-11-22	Win	(France) Nicolas Wamba	La 21ème Nuit des Champions	Marseille, France	RTD (injury)	2	3:00
Wins NDC K-1 Rules Heavyweight +100 kg Championship.
2014-09-26	Win	(Italy) Luca Panto	FFC Futures 3, Super Fight	Zagreb, Croatia	TKO (arm injury)	1	1:06
2014-06-24	Win	(Slovenia) Tomaž Simonič	K1 International Fight Night	Čatež ob Savi, Slovenia	Decision (unanimous)	3	3:00
2014-05-03	Win	(Lithuania) Tomas Pakutinskas	FFC Futures 2, Super Fight	Opatija, Croatia	TKO (arm injury)	1	0:36
2014-03-08	Win	(Netherlands) Jahfarr Wilnis	Glory 14: Zagreb	Zagreb, Croatia	KO (left high kick)	1	1:19
2013-12-13	Win	(Belgium) Kirk Krouba	FFC10: Rodriguez vs. Batzelas	Skopje, Macedonia	Decision (unanimous)	3	3:00
2013-10-25	Win	(Turkey) Ali Cenik	FFC08: Zelg vs. Rodriguez	Zagreb, Croatia	Decision (unanimous)	3	3:00
2013-05-10	Win	(Ukraine) Sergei Lascenko	FFC04: Perak vs. Joni	Zadar, Croatia	Decision (unanimous)	3	3:00
2013-03-15	Win	(Spain) Frank Muñoz	K-1 World Grand Prix FINAL in Zagreb, Super Fight	Zagreb, Croatia	Decision (unanimous)	3	3:00
2013-02-23	Win	(Belgium) Andy Van Steen	SUPERKOMBAT New Heroes 1	Opatija, Croatia	TKO (left high kick)	1	N/A
2012-07-07	Loss	(Romania) Benjamin Adegbuyi	SUPERKOMBAT World Grand Prix III 2012, Semi Finals	Varna, Bulgaria	Decision (unanimous)	3	3:00
2012-03-10	Win	(Tunisia) Mourad Bouzidi	Cro Cop Final Fight	Zagreb, Croatia	TKO (injury)	1	0:30
2011-07-16	Loss	(Suriname) Ismael Londt	SUPERKOMBAT World Grand Prix II 2011, Final	Constanța, Romania	TKO (referee stoppage)	1	0:55
For the SUPERKOMBAT World Grand Prix II 2011 Tournament title.
2011-07-16	Win	(United States) Mighty Mo	SUPERKOMBAT World Grand Prix II 2011, Semi Finals	Constanța, Romania	KO (left body kick)	1	2:18
2011-05-01	Win	(Hungary) Tihamer Brunner	Fight Code: Dragons Round 3	Budapest, Hungary	KO	1	1:06
2010-10-09	Win	(Czech Republic) Roman Kleibl	TK2 tournament in Marseille	Marseille, France	KO (right high kick)	1	1:55
2010-05-21	Win	(Czech Republic) Jan Soukup	K-1 World Grand Prix 2010 in Bucharest	Bucharest, Romania	Decision (unanimous)	3	3:00
2010-04-24	Draw	(Netherlands) Reamon Welboren	Gotti Promotion presents: Apocalix	Milan, Italy	Draw	3	3:00
2010-03-27	Win	(Romania) Mihaiţă Golescu	K-1 ColliZion 2010 Croatia	Split, Croatia	TKO (doctor stoppage)	2	3:00
2009-12-12	Loss	(Czech Republic) Roman Kleibl	K-1 ColliZion 2009 Final Tournament	Prague, Czech Republic	2 Ext. R Decision	5	3:00
Fight was for K-1 ColliZion 2009 Final tournament title.
2009-12-12	Win	(Romania) Coco Rus	K-1 ColliZion 2009 Final Tournament	Prague, Czech Republic	TKO (corner stoppage)	1	1:57
2009-12-12	Win	(Romania) Mihaiţă Golescu	K-1 ColliZion 2009 Final Tournament	Prague, Czech Republic	KO (left knee strike)	3	2:00
2009-10-24	Win	(Netherlands) Koos Wessels	K-1 ColliZion 2009 Final Elimination	Arad, Romania	Decision (unanimous)	3	3:00
2009-05-16	Win	(Czech Republic) Libor Polach	K-1 ColliZion 2009 Mladá Boleslav, Semi Finals	Mladá Boleslav, Czech Republic	KO (knee strike)	2	N/A
Wins K-1 ColliZion 2009 Mladá Boleslav 4-man Heavyweight tournament title. Had walktrough in final as Lubomir Suda was injured.
2009-02-28	Win	(Romania) Sebastian Ciobanu	K-1 Rules Tournament 2009 in Budapest	Budapest, Hungary	Ext. R decision (unanimous)	4	3:00
Wins K-1 Rules Tournament 2009 in Budapest championship.
2009-02-28	Win	(Hungary) Máté Zentai	K-1 Rules Tournament 2009 in Budapest	Budapest, Hungary	KO (left high kick)	1	2:46
2009-02-28	Win	(France) Joachim Thomas	K-1 Rules Tournament 2009 in Budapest	Budapest, Hungary	Decision (unanimous)	3	3:00
2008-10-26	Win	(Hungary) Attila Mathe	King of Colosseum - European Final Fight 2008	Ljubuški, Bosnia and Herzegovina	KO	N/A	N/A
2008-10-19	Win	(Hungary) Janos Rafief-Arifov	Lords of the Ring	Vienna, Austria	KO	2	2:09
2008-07-25	Win	(Bosnia and Herzegovina) Armin Zahirović	Božić vs Aramjan WBA title Fight Night	Novalja, Pag, Croatia	TKO	1	N/A
2008-05-17	Win	(Czech Republic) Roman Kleibl	K-1 Fighting Network Austria 2008	Vienna, Austria	Decision (unanimous)	3	3:00
Wins K-1 Fighting Network Austria 2008 championship.
2008-05-17	Win	(Italy) Renato Sini	K-1 Fighting Network Austria 2008	Vienna, Austria	KO (left high kick)	1	1:40
2008-05-17	Win	(Germany) Andreas Peters	K-1 Fighting Network Austria 2008	Vienna, Austria	TKO (corner stoppage)	1	1:53
2008-03-29	Win	(Greece) Kristof Kristodopulous	Božić vs Selini WBA title Fight Night	Široki Brijeg, Bosnia and Herzegovina	KO (knee strike)	1	2:21
2007-12-15	Win	(Hungary) Tihamer Brunner	Ultimate Fight Challenge 2	Samobor, Croatia	Decision (split)	3	3:00
2005-12-18	Win	(Sweden) Johan Mparmpagiannis	Heaven or Hell 6	Prague, Czech Republic	Decision (unanimous)	3	3:00
2005-11-25	Loss	(France) Cheick Kongo	King of Colloseum 2005	Mostar, Bosnia and Herzegovina	Decision (split)	3	3:00
2005-11-25	Win	(Bosnia and Herzegovina) Elvedin Tukić	King of Colosseum 2005	Mostar, Bosnia and Herzegovina	TKO	N/A	N/A
2005-08-19	Win	(Romania) Nicolae Moroşanu	K-1 Hungary Grand Prix 2005	Debrecen, Hungary	KO	1	2:13
2005-05-06	Loss	(Russia) Alexander Ustinov	K-1 Slovakia 2005	Bratislava, Slovakia	KO	N/A	N/A
2004-12-20	Loss	(Belarus) Vitali Akhramenko	Heaven or Hell 5	Prague, Czech Republic	Decision (unanimous)	3	3:00
2004-06-11	Loss	(Serbia) Duško Basrak	K-1 Grand Prix BIH 2004	Široki Brijeg, Bosnia and Herzegovina	Decision (split)	3	3:00
2004-06-11	Win	(Greece) Nikolaus Tsoukalas	K-1 Grand Prix BIH 2004	Široki Brijeg, Bosnia and Herzegovina	Decision (unanimous)	3	3:00
2004-05-15	Win	(Egypt) Amir el Alfy	Muay Thai Gala, Sporthal Zilvermeeuwen	Amsterdam, Netherlands	TKO (corner stoppage)	2	0:00
2004-04-08	Loss	(Switzerland) Bjorn Bregy	Heaven or Hell 4	Prague, Czech Republic	TKO (eye injury)	2	N/A
2004-02-07	Win	(Serbia) Duško Basrak	Croatia vs Serbia Kickboxing	Valpovo, Croatia	Decision (split)	3	3:00
2003-12-21	Win	(Bosnia and Herzegovina) Dženan Muminović	WKA European championship	Sarajevo, Bosnia and Herzegovina	KO	3	1:32
2003-10-25	Win	(Bosnia and Herzegovina) Dženan Muminović	Memorijal Ludvig Pavlović	Ljubuški, Bosnia and Herzegovina	TKO	1	N/A
2003-05-10	Loss	(Russia) Evgeny Orlov	K-1 World Grand Prix 2003 Preliminary Milan	Milan, Italy	KO	4	2:40
2003-04-13	Win	(Hungary) Jeno Beck	Noć Gladijatora	Osijek, Croatia	KO	1	0:32
2002-12-21	Win	(Slovakia) Miroslav Kasaja	Vanocni Lucernu	Prague, Czech Republic	KO	2	1:45
Legend: Win Loss Draw/no contest Notes

== See also ==
- List of K-1 events
- List of K-1 champions
- List of male kickboxers
