= D'Angelo Marshall =

Curaçaoan-Dutch kickboxer (born 1990)

- Born: September 20, 1990 (age 36); Amsterdam, Netherlands
- Other names: Pretty Boy; U.S.
- Nationality: Curaçaoan; Dutch
- Height: 1.95 m (6 ft 5 in)
- Weight: 111 kg (245 lb; 17.5 st)
- Division: Heavyweight
- Style: Muay Thai, Kickboxing
- Stance: Orthodox
- Fighting out of: Amsterdam, Netherlands
- Team: Team SLAMM!!
- Trainer: Milton Felter

Kickboxing record
- Total: 37
- Wins: 30
- By knockout: 17
- Losses: 6
- By knockout: 2
- Draws: 1

Other information
- Boxing record from BoxRec
- Last updated on: January 3, 2021

D'Angelo Marshall (born 20 September 1990) is a Curaçaoan-Dutch kickboxer, currently signed with Glory.

He won the 2013 SUPERKOMBAT World Grand Prix III, the 2015 SUPERKOMBAT Special Edition and 2017 Glory Heavyweight Contender Tournament tournaments.

== Kickboxing career ==
=== SUPERKOMBAT ===
In 2013, Marshall entered the SUPERKOMBAT World Grand Prix as a prospect of the Dutch school. He was the third heavyweight to qualify for the SUPERKOMBAT World Grand Prix 2013 Final Elimination by winning over both Gaétan Sautron, and Giannis Stoforidis at the SUPERKOMBAT World Grand Prix III 2013.

He beat Pacôme Assi by second-round KO at the SUPERKOMBAT World Grand Prix 2013 Final Elimination in Ploiești, but lost to the eventual champion Frank Muñoz by unanimous decision in the semi-finals.

He defeated Thomas Vanneste at SUPERKOMBAT World Grand Prix III 2014 in Constanța, Romania on June 21, 2014. In March 2015, he beat Michał Wlazło by a first-round TKO.

He participated in the 2015 SUPERKOMBAT Special Edition heavyweight tournament. He beat Michal Reissinger by decision in the semifinals, and won the tournament with a split decision win over Nikolaj Falin.

His last fight with SUPERKOMBAT, was in May 2016, when he won a unanimous decision against Kirk Krouba.

=== GLORY ===
He was scheduled to face Guto Inocente in a co-headliner at Glory 37: Los Angeles Innocente won the fight by an extra round decision.

At Glory 41, he took part in the GLORY Heavyweight Contender tournament. He knocked out Mohamed Abdallah after just 48 seconds in the semifinals, and won a unanimous decision against Anderson Silva in the finals.

Afterwards, he fought Ismael Londt at Glory 49, and won by a first-round knockout. In the 2018 GLORY Contender tournament, he lost by knockout to Benjamin Adegbuyi in the semifinals.

Marshall won three of his next five fights, defeating Antonio Dvorak, Daniel Škvor and Jahfarr Wilnis, but losing to Jamal Ben Saddik and Benjamin Adegbuyi.

== Titles ==
=== Professional ===
- SUPERKOMBAT Fighting Championship
  - 2013 SUPERKOMBAT World Grand Prix III Tournament Champion
  - 2015 SUPERKOMBAT Special Edition Tournament Champion
- Glory
  - 2017 Glory Heavyweight (+95 kg/209.4 lb) Contender Tournament Winner

== Professional kickboxing record ==
Kickboxing Record
30 wins (17 KOs), 6 losses, 1 draw
Date	Result	Opponent	Event	Location	Method	Round	Time
2019-11-22	Loss	(Romania) Benjamin Adegbuyi	Glory 71: Chicago	Chicago, USA	Decision (Unanimous)	3	3:00
2019-07-05	Win	(Netherlands) Jahfarr Wilnis	Glory 67: Orlando	Orlando, USA	Decision (Unanimous)	3	3:00
2019-03-09	Win	(Czech Republic) Daniel Škvor	Glory 64: Strasbourg	Strasbourg, France	KO (Punch)	3	1:43
2018-09-29	Loss	(Morocco) Jamal Ben Saddik	Glory 59: Amsterdam	Amsterdam, Netherlands	TKO (3 Knockdowns Rules)	1	0:57
2018-08-10	Win	(United States) Antonio Dvorak	Glory 56: Denver	Denver, Colorado	TKO (Straight right)	1	2:14
2018-02-16	Loss	(Romania) Benjamin Adegbuyi	Glory 50: Chicago - Heavyweight Contender Tournament, Semi Finals	Chicago, US	KO (Punch)	1	0:36
2017-12-09	Win	(Suriname) Ismael Londt	Glory 49: Rotterdam	Rotterdam, Netherlands	Decision (Unanimous)	3	3:00
2017-05-20	Win	(Brazil) Anderson Silva	Glory 41: Holland, Final	Den Bosch, Netherlands	Decision (Unanimous)	3	3:00
Wins Glory Heavyweight Contender Tournament.
2017-05-20	Win	(Germany) Mohamed Abdallah	Glory 41: Holland, Semi Finals	Den Bosch, Netherlands	TKO (2 knockdowns)	1	0:48
2017-01-20	Loss	(Brazil) Guto Inocente	Glory 37: Los Angeles	Los Angeles, California, US	Ext. R. Decision (Unanimous)	4	3:00
2016-05-07	Win	(Belgium) Kirk Krouba	SUPERKOMBAT World Grand Prix II 2016	Bucharest, Romania	Decision (Unanimous)	3	3:00
2016-04-28	Win	(Belarus) Zakhar Trofimov	Tatneft Cup - 3rd selection 1/8 final	Kazan, Russia	TKO (Referee Stoppage)	2	1:52
2015-06-13	Win	(Russia) Nikolaj Falin	SUPERKOMBAT Special Edition, Finals	Spreitenbach, Switzerland	Decision (Split)	3	3:00
Wins 2015 SUPERKOMBAT Special Edition Tournament Championship.
2015-06-13	Win	(Czech Republic) Michal Reissinger	SUPERKOMBAT Special Edition, Semi Finals	Spreitenbach, Switzerland	Decision	3	3:00
2015-03-07	Win	(Poland) Michał Wlazło	SUPERKOMBAT World Grand Prix I 2015	Ploiești, Romania	TKO (Referee Stoppage)	1	2:59
2014-06-21	Win	(Belgium) Thomas Vanneste	SUPERKOMBAT World Grand Prix III 2014	Constanța, Romania	Decision (Unanimous)	3	3:00
2013-12-21	Loss	(Spain) Frank Muñoz	SUPERKOMBAT World Grand Prix 2013 Final, Semi Finals	Galați, Romania	Decision (Unanimous)	3	3:00
2013-11-09	Win	(France) Pacôme Assi	SUPERKOMBAT World Grand Prix 2013 Final Elimination, Quarter Finals	Ploiești, Romania	KO (Punches)	2	0:20
2013-09-28	Win	(Greece) Giannis Stoforidis	SUPERKOMBAT World Grand Prix III 2013, Final	Botoșani, Romania	TKO (Referee Stoppage)	3	0:26
Wins SUPERKOMBAT World Grand Prix III tournament title.
2013-09-28	Win	(France) Gaétan Sautron	SUPERKOMBAT World Grand Prix III 2013, Semi Finals	Botoșani, Romania	TKO (Referee Stoppage)	4	2:53
2013-08-08	Win	(Aruba) Nedd Evan	Slamm!! Soema Na Basi IV	Paramaribo, Suriname	Decision	3	3:00
2013-06-29	Loss	(Armenia) Jegish Yegoian	Death Before Dishonor - Part III	Almere, Netherlands	Decision	3	3:00
2012-05-25	Win	(Netherlands) Patrick Veenstra	Elsomo Muaythai Event	Marum, Netherlands	KO (Right Low Kick)	2	
2013-02-24	Win	(Morocco) Essanoussi Bilal	Oosterbaan Gym Vs. De Rest - Part 2	Rotterdam, Netherlands	Decision (Unanimous)	3	3:00
2012-10-29	Win	(Germany) Jerry Otto	La Onda Fight Night	Magdeburg, Germany	KO (Right Knee)	1	
2012-09-01	Win	(Netherlands) Sammy Saam	Mix Fight Gala XIII	Frankfurt, Germany	TKO	1	
2012-07-07	Win	(Croatia) Dragan	Fight Fans Last Fight Before Summer	Nieuwegein, Netherlands	KO (Right Low Kick)	1	
2012-06-03	Loss	(Netherlands) Martin Terpstra	Fight Fans	Amsterdam, Netherlands	Decision (Unanimous)	3	3:00
2012-04-21	Draw	(Netherlands) Patrick Veenstra	Elsomo Muaythai Event	Marum, Netherlands	Decision Draw	3	3:00
2011-10-29	Win	(Denmark) Michael Steffensen	Muaythai Event Of Garuda Gym	Emmen, Netherlands	KO (Right Knees)	1	
2011-10-09	Win	(Netherlands) Jeanôt Adriaan	Death Before Dishonor - Part II	Almere, Netherlands	Decision (Unanimous)	3	3:00
2011-06-05	Win	(Georgia (country)) Shota Dolidze	MM - Memento Mori 2	Rotterdam, Netherlands	Decision (Unanimous)	3	3:00
2011-04-10	Win	(Suriname) Ilnitsj Vrede	Almere's Finest I	Almere, Netherlands	KO	2	
2010-11-28	Win	(Italy) Antonio Alecci	Muaythai Event	Enschede, Netherlands	KO (Right High Kick)	1	
Legend: Win Loss Draw/No contest Notes

== See also ==
- List of male kickboxers
