= Guto Inocente =

Brazilian kickboxer and mixed martial arts fighter

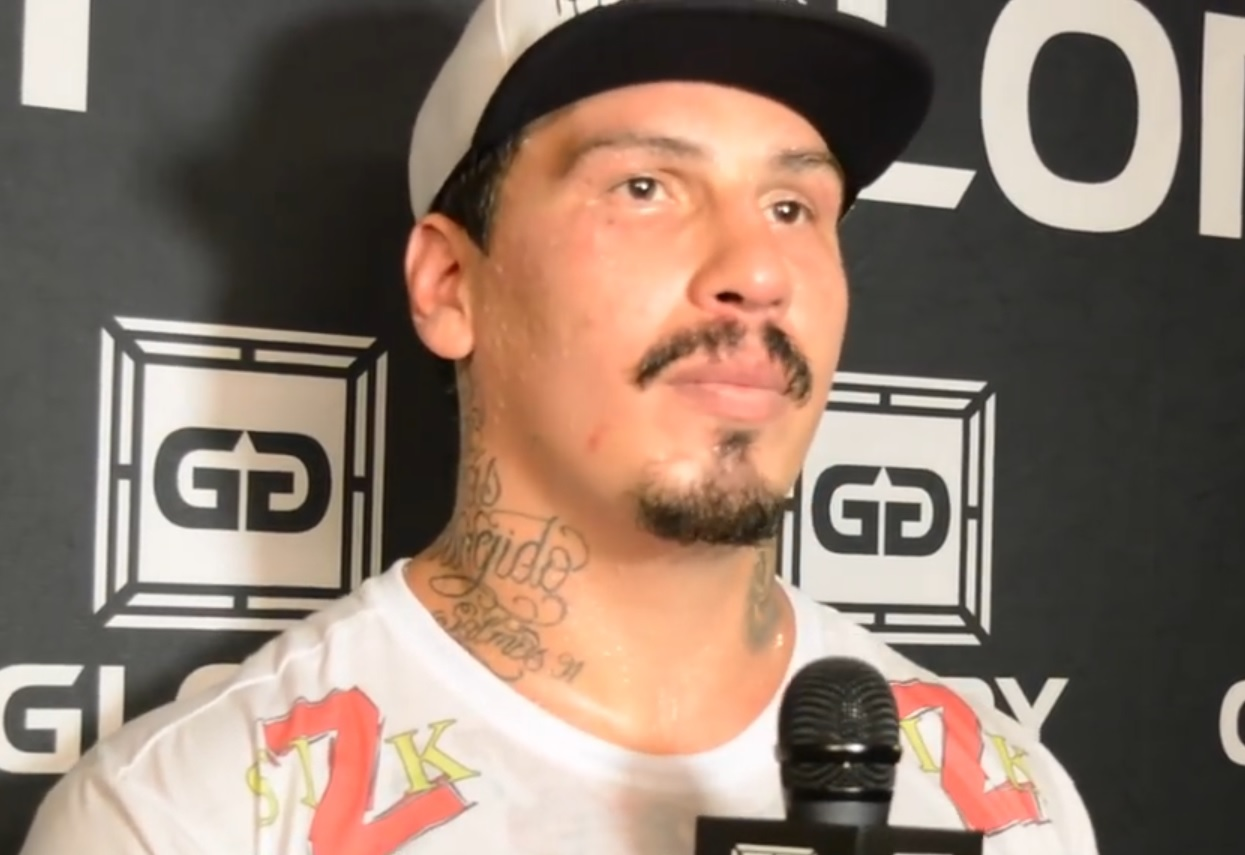
- Born: Carlos Augusto Inocente Filho; May 29, 1986 (age 40); Brasília, DF, Brazil
- Height: 6 ft 3 in (191 cm)
- Weight: 260 lb (118 kg; 18 st 8 lb)
- Division: Light Heavyweight; Heavyweight
- Reach: 76.0 in (193 cm)
- Fighting out of: Delray Beach, Florida, United States
- Team: Blackzilians
- Rank: Second degree black belt in Kickboxing; Black Belt in Brazilian Jiu-Jitsu
- Years active: 2005–present

Kickboxing record
- Total: 52
- Wins: 40
- By knockout: 19
- Losses: 12

Mixed martial arts record
- Total: 19
- Wins: 11
- By knockout: 7
- By submission: 3
- By decision: 1
- Losses: 8
- By knockout: 3
- By submission: 2
- By decision: 3

Other information
- Mixed martial arts record from Sherdog

Carlos Augusto "Guto" Inocente Filho (born May 29, 1986) is a Brazilian professional mixed martial artist and kickboxer. A professional MMA competitor since 2005, Inocente formerly competed for the UFC and Strikeforce in MMA.

He signed with Glory Kickboxing in 2016, eventually becoming a contender. In 2017, Inocente was banned for 4 years by the World Association of Kickboxing Organizations after he tested positive for four banned substances from the 2017 World Games.

He is ranked as the sixth best heavyweight by Combat Press as of September 2022, and eighth best by Beyond Kick as of October 2022. Combat Press previously ranked him as the #10 heavyweight in the world between July and August 2021.

== Background ==
Originally from Brasília, Brazil, Inocente first began training in striking at the age of four, coached by his father, and then began training in Brazilian jiu-jitsu at the age of seven. Inocente would go on to have accomplished careers in professional boxing and kickboxing, winning various titles; Inocente is a former five-time Brazilian Kickboxing Champion, a three-time Pan-American Champion, and a three-time South American Champion, among other titles.

== Mixed martial arts career ==
=== Early career ===
Inocente made his professional MMA debut in 2005 and fought seven bouts in five years, two of them being for Shooto. There he defeated Vitor Miranda and one month later Gustavo Moia, to become the Shooto South American Heavyweight (220 lb) Champion. In 2011, with a record of 5–2, Inocente signed with Strikeforce.

=== Strikeforce ===
Inocente was expected to face Lionel Lanham on July 22, 2011, at Strikeforce Challengers: Bowling vs. Voelker. However, he was forced out of the bout due to injury and was replaced by T. J. Cook.

Inocente made his debut on January 7, 2012, at Strikeforce: Rockhold vs. Jardine against Virgil Zwicker. He defeated Zwicker via unanimous decision (29–28, 29–28, 30–27).

Inocente was expected to face Gian Villante on September 29, 2012, at Strikeforce: Melendez vs. Healy, but Showtime canceled the entire card due to Gilbert Melendez suffering an injury.

=== Ultimate Fighting Championship ===
After the demise of Strikeforce, Inocente signed with the UFC.

Inocente was expected to face Shane del Rosario in a Heavyweight bout on December 28, 2013, at UFC 168. However, both participants pulled out of the bout citing injuries. Inocente's knee injury was exacerbated when he was re-injured by Alistair Overeem during training; a move that resulted in Overeem being asked to leave the Blackzillians. Reportedly, Inocente was sparring with Overeem and, despite having a broken hand, was getting the better of the exchanges until Overeem took Inocente down, causing the injury to Inocente's knee.

After over two years away from active competition due to injuries, Inocente made his UFC debut at The Ultimate Fighter 19 Finale on July 6, 2014, against Derrick Lewis. He lost the fight via KO in the first round.

Inocente then dropped to Light Heavyweight and faced Australian Anthony Perosh at UFC Fight Night 55 on 8 November 2014. He lost the fight via submission in the first round and later dismissed from the promotion.

=== Post-UFC career ===
After the release from UFC, Inocente fought Cristiano Bob at Capital Fight 5 on June 11, 2015. He won the fight via technical knockout. After the win, Inocente would go on to concentrate on his kickboxing career for a few years.

In late 2019, news surfaced that Inocente had applied to Brave CF openweight tournament lottery and was eventually picked to be a part of the tournament. He lost in the semifinals to Azamat Murzakanov on November 15, 2019.

On July 28, 2020, it was announced that Inocente had signed a contract with Taura MMA. He is expected to make his promotional debut against DJ Linderman at Taura MMA 11 on October 30, 2020.

Despite having signed a fight contract with Taura, Inocente fought Flavio Magon at Federal Fight 2 on September 5, 2020, in his native Brazil. He won the fight and claimed the vacant Federal Fight Heavyweight Championship via first-round knockout.

Inocente made his KSW debut against the former KSW Heavyweight title challenger Michał Andryszak at KSW 58: Kołecki vs. Zawada. Andryszak won the fight by an arm-triangle choke in the second round.

Inocente won his next two bouts on May 27 and July 29, 2021, at Nação Cyborg 8 and 9 against Lucas Henrique Monteiro and Alison Vicente via first round stoppages. In the second bout, Inocente would also win the NC Heavyweight Championship.

==== Global Fight League ====
On December 11, 2024, it was announced that Inocente was signed by Global Fight League. However, he was not drafted for the 2025 season. In turn, in April 2025, it was reported that all GFL events were cancelled indefinitely.

== Kickboxing career ==
=== Glory ===
Inocente's debut with Glory came in February 2016, when he faced Demoreo Dennis. Inocente knocked Dennis out with a spinning hook kick in just 40 seconds. The finish won Glory's 2016 "Knockout of the Year" award.

Returning briefly to WGP, Inocente defended his Super Heavyweight title for the first time against Lucas Alsina. He beat Alsina by a fourth-round TKO, due to low kicks.

His second Glory fight was against Brian Douwes, a fight which Inocente won by a unanimous decision.

He was scheduled to fight Hesdy Gerges during Glory 33. Inocente won the fight by a split decision.

Inocente beat D'Angelo Marshall during Glory 37, by an extra round decision.

He scored controversial decision upset of Benjamin Adegbuyi in the main event of Glory 43: New York, after appearing to lose two of the three rounds they had fought. The result was met with boos from the crowd, venting fury on Twitter shortly afterwards.

Guto took part in the 2018 Heavyweight Contender Tournament. Despite winning the semifinal bout against Junior Tafa, he was unable to advance to the finals due to a cut.

He was scheduled to fight Rico Verhoeven for the Glory Heavyweight title during Glory 59. Rico won the fight by a unanimous decision.

Inocente took part in the Glory 62 eight man heavyweight tournament. After winning a decision against Mohamed Abdallah in the quarter-finals, he lost a decision in turn to Jamal Ben Saddik in the semifinals.

Guto defended the WGP title for a second time in June 2019, against Françesco Xhaja. Xhaja lost the fight by a unanimous decision.

Inocente defended the WGP Super Heavyweight title, during WGP 59, against Haime Morais. Inocente won the fight by a unanimous decision.

=== Doping suspension ===
In 2017, it was announced that Inocente was stripped of World Games gold after testing positive for four banned substances, including stanozolol, anastrozole, tamoxifen and THC. The Brazilian did not request a hearing and accepted the result, being banned by the World Association of Kickboxing Organizations (WAKO) until July 26, 2021.

=== ONE Championship ===
On May 20, 2020, it was reported that Inocente had signed with ONE Championship. Inocente is reportedly scheduled to make his ONE debut at ONE: Full Circle on February 25, 2022, against Bruno Susano. He defeated Susano by second-round technical knockout.

Inocente was scheduled to face Rade Opačić at ONE 157 on May 20, 2022. The bout was later postponed, as Inocente tested positive for COVID-19, and was rescheduled for ONE 158 on June 3, 2022. He won the bout via KO stoppage due to a liver punch in the first round.

Inocente faced the reigning ONE Light Heavyweight Kickboxing World Champion Roman Kryklia in the semifinals of the ONE Kickboxing Heavyweight Grand Prix at ONE 161 on September 29, 2022. He lost the fight by a first-round knockout.

Inocente faced Rade Opačić at ONE Fight Night 11 on June 11, 2023. He lost the fight by unanimous decision.

=== Gamebred Bareknuckle MMA ===
Inocente was scheduled to face Maurice Greene at Gamebred Bareknuckle MMA 7 on March 2, 2024. However, the bout was cancelled for unknown reasons.

Inocente faced Marcus Brigagao at Gamebred Bareknukcle MMA 8 on November 15, 2024, and won the bout by technical knockout in the first round.

== Bare-knuckle boxing ==
Inocente made his Bare Knuckle Fighting Championship debut against Hasan Yousefi on April 5, 2025, at BKFC 72 Dubai: Day 2. He lost the fight by unanimous decision.

== Championships and accomplishments ==
=== Mixed martial arts ===
- Nação Cyborg
  - 2021 Nação Cyborg Heavyweight Champion (one time, current)
- Shooto
  - Shooto South American 220 lb Champion (one time)
- Win Fight and Entertainment
  - WFE Light Heavyweight Champion (one time)

=== Kickboxing ===
- WGP Kickboxing
  - 2019 WGP Kickboxing Super Heavyweight (+94 kg) Champion
  - 2016 WGP Kickboxing world Super Heavyweight championship
  - 2015 WGP Kickboxing world Light Heavyweight championship
- World Association of Kickboxing Organizations
  - 2010 W.A.K.O. Pan American Championship in Guarujá, Brazil (gold) (K-1 rules +91 kg)
  - 2010 20th W.A.K.O. Brazilian Championships in Rio de Janeiro, Brazil (gold) (K-1 rules +91 kg)
  - 2009 W.A.K.O. South American Championship in Asunción, Paraguay (gold) (K-1 rules +91 kg)
  - 2009 W.A.K.O. World Championship in Villach, Austria (silver) (K-1 rules +91 kg)
  - 2008 and 2009 W.A.K.O. Brazilian Championships in São Paulo, Brazil (gold) (K-1 rules +91 kg)
  - 2008 W.A.K.O. Pan American Championship in Viña del Mar, Chile (gold) (K-1 rules +91 kg)
  - 2007 W.A.K.O. South American Championship in São Paulo, Brazil (gold) (K-1 rules +91 kg)
  - 2006 W.A.K.O. Pan American Championship in Niterói, Brazil (gold) (K-1 rules +91 kg)

Awards

- Liverkick.com
  - 2016 Knockout of the Year (vs. Demoreo Dennis)

== Kickboxing record ==
Professional kickboxing record
41 wins (20 KOs), 13 losses, 0 draws
Date	Result	Opponent	Event	Location	Method	Round	Time
2024-08-24	Loss	(Brazil) Ariel Machado	K-1 World GP 2024 in Brasília, Semifinals	Brasília, Brazil	Decision (unanimous)	3	3:00
2024-08-24	Win	(Brazil) Jefferson Salviano	K-1 World GP 2024 in Brasília, Quarterfinals	Brasília, Brazil	KO (front kick)	1	0:59
2023-06-10	Loss	(Serbia) Rade Opačić	ONE Fight Night 11	Bangkok, Thailand	Decision (unanimous)	3	3:00
2022-09-29	Loss	(Ukraine) Roman Kryklia	ONE 161	Kallang, Singapore	TKO (head kick)	1	0:52
ONE Heavyweight Kickboxing World Grand Prix Semi-Final.
2022-06-03	Win	(Serbia) Rade Opačić	ONE 158	Kallang, Singapore	KO (body punch)	1	2:33
2022-02-25	Win	(Portugal) Bruno Susano	ONE: Full Circle	Kallang, Singapore	TKO (referee stoppage/punches)	2	2:22
2019-11-09	Win	(Brazil) Haime Morais	WGP Kickboxing #59	Brasília, Brazil	Decision (unanimous)	5	3:00
Defends the WGP Kickboxing Super heavyweight (+94kg) title.
2019-06-15	Win	(Albania) Françesko Xhaja	WGP Kickboxing #55	Brasília, Brazil	Decision (unanimous)	5	3:00
Defends the WGP Kickboxing Super heavyweight (+94kg) title.
2018-12-08	Loss	(Morocco) Jamal Ben Saddik	Glory 62: Rotterdam, Semi-finals	Rotterdam, Netherlands	Decision (unanimous)	3	3:00
2018-12-08	Win	(Germany) Mohamed Abdallah	Glory 62: Rotterdam, Quarter-finals	Rotterdam, Netherlands	Decision (4–1)	3	3:00
2018-09-29	Loss	(Netherlands) Rico Verhoeven	Glory 59: Amsterdam	Amsterdam, Netherlands	Decision (unanimous)	5	3:00
For the Glory Heavyweight Championship.
2018-02-16	Win	(Australia) Junior Tafa	Glory 50: Chicago - Heavyweight Contender Tournament, Semi-finals	Chicago, US	Decision (unanimous)	3	3:00
2017-07-14	Win	(Romania) Benjamin Adegbuyi	Glory 43: New York	New York City, New York, US	Decision (split)	3	3:00
2017-03-25	Loss	(Morocco) Jamal Ben Saddik	Glory 39: Brussels	Brussels, Belgium	Decision (unanimous)	3	3:00
2017-01-20	Win	(Curaçao) D'Angelo Marshall	Glory 37: Los Angeles	Los Angeles, California, US	Ext. R. decision (unanimous)	4	3:00
2016-09-09	Win	(Netherlands) Hesdy Gerges	Glory 33: New Jersey	Trenton, New Jersey	Decision (split)	3	3:00
2016-05-13	Win	(Netherlands) Brian Douwes	Glory 30: Los Angeles	Ontario, California	Decision (unanimous)	3	3:00
2016-04-09	Win	(Argentina) Lucas Alsina	WGP Kickboxing 29	Paraná, Brasil	KO (low kicks)	4	1:30
Defended the title in category +207 pounds.
2016-02-26	Win	(United States) Demoreo Dennis	Glory 27: Chicago	Hoffman Estates, Illinois, US	KO (spinning hook kick)	1	0:40
2015-09-05	Win	(Brazil) Felipe Micheletti	WGP Kickboxing 26	Guarapuava, Brazil	Decision (unanimous)	5	3:00
Wins the WGP world light heavyweight championship -185 pounds.
2008-03-08	Loss	(Croatia) Gordan Jukić	Obračun u ringu 7	Zadar, Croatia	Decision (unanimous)	3	3:00
2007-11-10	Loss	(Brazil) Anderson Silva	Demolition Fight 6	São Paulo, Brazil	Decision (unanimous)	3	3:00
For The Brazilian Cruiserweight (+84 kg) title.

Amateur kickboxing record
Date	Result	Opponent	Event	Location	Method	Round	Time
2009-10	Loss	(Belarus) Alexey Kudin	W.A.K.O World Championships 2009, K-1 Final + 91 kg kg	Villach, Austria			
Wins W.A.K.O. World Championship '09 K-1 Silver Medal + 91 kg kg.
2009-10	Win	(Hungary) Tihamer Brunner	W.A.K.O World Championships 2009, K-1 Semi-finals + 91 kg kg	Villach, Austria			
2007-09-?	Loss	(Montenegro) Mirko Vlahovic	W.A.K.O World Championships 2007, K-1 Rules Quarter-finals +91 kg	Belgrade, Serbia			
2007-09-?	Win	(Croatia) Leonardo Komsic	W.A.K.O World Championships 2007, K-1 Rules 1st round +91 kg	Belgrade, Serbia			
Legend: Win Loss Draw/no contest Notes

== Mixed martial arts record ==
Professional record breakdown
19 matches	11 wins	8 losses
By knockout	7	3
By submission	3	2
By decision	1	3

Res.	Record	Opponent	Method	Event	Date	Round	Time	Location	Notes
Loss	11–8	Oleg Olenichev	TKO (punches)	RCC Hard 21 x Gamebred FC	September 12, 2026	1	3:04	Chelyabinsk, Russia	
Loss	11–7	Thiago Santos	TKO (punches)	Gamebred Bareknuckle MMA 9	April 10, 2026	1	4:20	Santo Domingo, Dominican Republic	Gamebred FC Heavyweight Tournament Round of 16.
Win	11–6	Marcos Brigagão	TKO (punches)	Gamebred Bareknuckle MMA 8	November 15, 2024	1	4:20	Biloxi, Mississippi, United States	
Win	10–6	Alison Vicente	TKO (punches)	Nação Cyborg 9	July 29, 2021	1	3:45	Paraná, Brazil	Won the vacant Nação Cyborg Heavyweight Championship.
Win	9–6	Lucas Henrique Monteiro	TKO (punches)	Nação Cyborg 8	May 27, 2021	1	3:18	Piraquara, Brazil	
Loss	8–6	Michał Andryszak	Submission (arm-triangle choke)	KSW 58	January 30, 2021	2	4:06	Łódź, Poland	
Win	8–5	Flavio Magon	KO (punch)	Federal Fight 2	September 5, 2020	1	3:52	Taguatinga, Brazil	Won the vacant Federal Fight Heavyweight Championship.
Loss	7–5	Azamat Murzakanov	Decision (unanimous)	Brave CF 29	November 15, 2019	3	5:00	Isa Town, Bahrain	Brave CF Openweight Tournament Semifinal.
Win	7–4	Cristiano Bob	TKO (head kick and punches)	Capital Fight 5	June 11, 2015	2	2:05	Brasília, Brazil	
Loss	6–4	Anthony Perosh	Submission (rear-naked choke)	UFC Fight Night: Rockhold vs. Bisping	November 8, 2014	1	3:46	Sydney, Australia	Return to Light Heavyweight.
Loss	6–3	Derrick Lewis	KO (punches)	The Ultimate Fighter: Team Edgar vs. Team Penn Finale	July 6, 2014	1	3:30	Las Vegas, Nevada, United States	Heavyweight bout.
Win	6–2	Virgil Zwicker	Decision (unanimous)	Strikeforce: Barnett vs. Cormier	May 19, 2012	3	5:00	San Jose, California, United States	Light Heavyweight bout.
Win	5–2	Gustavo Moia	KO (knee)	Shooto Brazil 18	September 17, 2010	1	0:40	Brasília, Brazil	Won Shooto South-American Heavyweight (220 lb) Championship.
Win	4–2	Kléber Raimundo Silva	TKO (shoulder injury)	Win Fight and Entertainment 7	August 21, 2010	2	N/A	Salvador, Brazil	Won WFE Light Heavyweight Championship.
Win	3–2	Vitor Miranda	Submission (punches)	Shooto Brazil 17	August 6, 2010	2	1:43	Rio de Janeiro, Brazil	
Loss	2–2	Ismael de Jesus	Decision (unanimous)	Goiânia Open Fight 2	May 12, 2007	3	5:00	Goiânia, Brazil	
Win	2–1	Junior Beba	Submission (triangle choke)	Paraúna Fight	August 12, 2006	1	2:30	Paraúna, Brazil	
Win	1–1	Diego Nunes	Submission (armbar)	Extreme Fight Brasilia	April 6, 2005	1	N/A	Brasília, Brazil	
Loss	0–1	Leandro Silva	Decision (unanimous)	Goiânia Open Fight 1	March 19, 2005	3	5:00	Goiânia, Brazil	

== Custom rules record ==
Res.	Record	Opponent	Method	Event	Date	Round	Time	Location	Notes
Loss	0–1	Igor Zagaynov	TKO (punches)	RCC x Karate Combat Fight Night	October 17, 2026	1	2:48	Yekaterinburg, Russia	Karate Combat rules

== Bare knuckle boxing record ==
Professional record breakdown
1 match	0 wins	1 loss
By decision	0	1

Res.	Record	Opponent	Method	Event	Date	Round	Time	Location	Notes
Loss	0–1	Hasan Yousefi	Decision (unanimous)	BKFC 72 Dubai: Day 2	April 5, 2025	5	2:00	Dubai, United Arab Emirates	

== See also ==
- List of male kickboxers
- List of male mixed martial artists
