= Benjamin Adegbuyi =

Romanian kickboxer and boxer (born 1985)

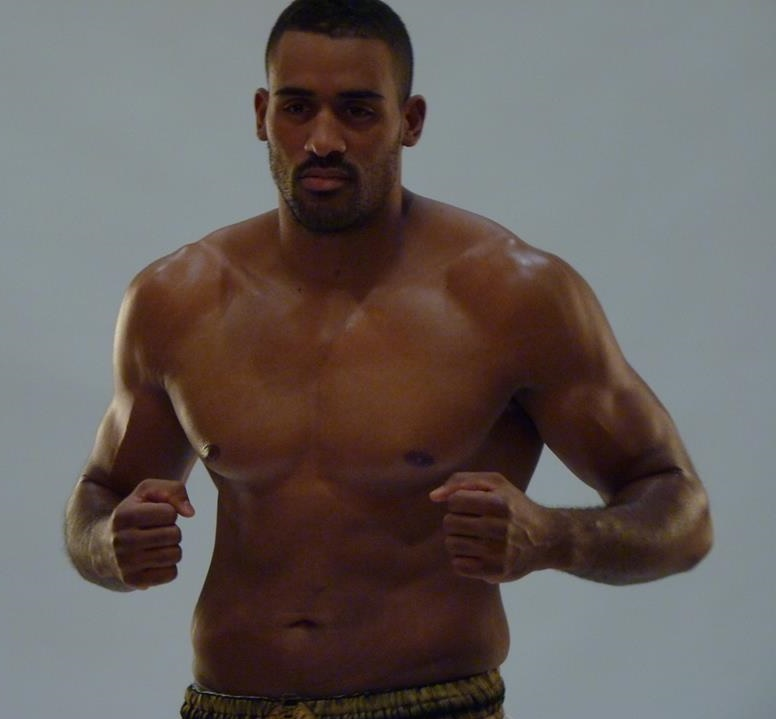
- Born: Benjamin Adekunle Miron Adegbuyi; January 24, 1985 (age 41); Cluj-Napoca, Romania
- Other names: Mister Gentleman; Hammer (former)
- Nationality: Romanian
- Height: 198 cm (6 ft 6 in)
- Weight: 120.9 kg (267 lb; 19.04 st)
- Division: Heavyweight
- Reach: 77.5 in (197 cm)
- Fighting out of: Bucharest, Romania
- Team: Superpro Sportcenter; Superpro Sibiu; Respect Gym (formerly)
- Trainer: Dennis Krauweel: Head coach Alin Bălașa: Boxing; Cristian Mărgărit: Nutrition; Alin Panaite: Head coach (formerly)
- Years active: 2011–present

Kickboxing record
- Total: 46
- Wins: 35
- By knockout: 20
- Losses: 10
- By knockout: 5
- Draws: 0
- No contests: 1

Other information
- Spouse: Elena Adegbuyi
- Last updated on: August 26, 2022

Benjamin Adegbuyi

YouTube information
- Channel: Benny Adegbuyi
- Years active: 2014–present
- Genre: vlog
- Subscribers: 24,200
- Views: 2.04 million
- Last updated: August 4, 2026

Benjamin Adekunle Miron Adegbuyi (born January 24, 1985) is a Romanian kickboxer and professional boxer. He is a two-time Glory Heavyweight Championship challenger and three-time winner of heavyweight tournament. Adegbuyi is also Superkombat World Grand Prix III 2012 tournament winner and 2018 Glory Heavyweight Grand Prix tournament runner-up. A professional since 2011, he also fought in K-1.

As of December 13, 2022, he is #5 in the Combat Press heavyweight rankings. Combat Press has ranked him in the top 5 since November 2014. As of 1 January 2023, he is also ranked the #5 heavyweight in the world by Beyond Kick. As of 1 August 2025, Adegbuyi is ranked the #13 heavyweight kickboxer in the world by Boxemag.

Adegbuyi has beaten Jahfarr Wilnis and Mladen Brestovac three times, Hesdy Gerges and D'Angelo Marshall twice, and Badr Hari, Pavel Zhuravlev, Ismael Londt, Sergei Lashchenko, Anderson Silva and Jairzinho Rozenstruik once.

== Early life ==
Adegbuyi was born in Cluj-Napoca, Romania to a Romanian mother and Nigerian yoruba father. Since the age of eight, he spent his childhood together with his mother and newborn sister in Aiud, Transylvania.

As a child, he competed in sports like shotokan karate, boxing and basketball.

== Professional kickboxing career ==
Adegbuyi made his kickboxing debut as a professional on March 18, 2011.

=== K-1 debut ===
He signed with K-1 in August 2012.

Adegbuyi faced Jafar Ahmadi in a non-tournament bout at the K-1 World Grand Prix 2012 in Tokyo final 16 on October 14. Adegbuyi won via TKO early in the first round after Ahmadi seemingly broke his left arm upon impact with Benny’s upper leg as he landed a middle kick on Jafar.

=== SUPERKOMBAT World Grand Prix 2012 ===
After winning the title of the SUPERKOMBAT World Grand Prix III 2012 tournament (in which he defeated the highly rated and experienced Croat Mladen Brestovac), he was scheduled to fight Alexey Ignashov in the tournament on November 10 in Craiova, Romania at the SUPERKOMBAT World Grand Prix 2012 Final Elimination. However, Ignashov could not fight due to injury and was replaced by the previous year's SUPERKOMBAT World Grand Prix Champion, Sergei Lascenko. Adegbuyi battered Lascenko, flooring him twice in the first round before the referee called a halt to the bout.

Despite entering as the tournament favourite, Adegbuyi was exposed by eventual champion Pavel Zhuravlev when the Ukrainian KOed him in first round in the semi-finals at the SUPERKOMBAT World Grand Prix 2012 Final on December 22 in Bucharest.

=== 2013 season: run ===
He defeated Mohamed Belazaar via first-round TKO due to an injury a SUPERKOMBAT World Grand Prix I 2013 in Oradea, Romania on April 6.

He rematched Jairzinho Rozenstruik at SUPERKOMBAT World Grand Prix II 2013 in Craiova, Romania on May 18, and won by unanimous decision.

He beat Ismael Londt by unanimous decision at Slamm!! Soema Na Basi IV in Paramaribo, Suriname on August 8, 2013.

He defeat Reamon Welboren by unanimous decision at SUPERKOMBAT World Grand Prix III 2013 in Botoșani, Romania on September 28.

=== Adegbuyi vs. Zhuravlev II ===
He rematched Pavel Zhuravlev at the SUPERKOMBAT World Grand Prix 2013 Final in Galați, Romania on December 21, 2013, winning by third-round KO.

=== GLORY ===
Adegbuyi prompted GLORY to pick him up and give him a shot on the best stage, after tearing it up on SUPERKOMBAT.

He was scheduled to face Jamal Ben Saddik at Glory 14: Zagreb in Zagreb, Croatia on March 8, 2014. However, Ben Saddik broke his hand while training and was replaced by Dmytro Bezus. Prior to the fight, Adegbuyi and Andrei Stoica spent time as sparring partners of Alexander Gustafsson at the Allstars Training Center in Stockholm, Sweden. Adegbuyi knocked down Bezus three times winning by second-round TKO.

He scored a second-round KO over Daniel Sam at Glory 16: Denver in Broomfield, Colorado, United States on May 3, 2014.

In September, Adegbuyi was voted runner-up "Best New Talent" in the official GLORY Half-Year Awards.

Adegbuyi beat Hesdy Gerges in November at Glory 18: Oklahoma on Spike, and became the mandatory challenger for a shot at the heavyweight title.

He faced Daniel Lentie on 7 March 2015 at SUPERKOMBAT World Grand Prix I 2015. Adegbuyi dominated his opponent, winning via unanimous decision.

==== GLORY Heavyweight Title Shot ====
Adegbuyi faced GLORY Heavyweight Champion Rico Verhoeven at Glory 22: Lille on June 5, 2015. At the event, Adegbuyi was defeated by unanimous decision (49-46, 49–46, 50–45). Verhoeven showed his superior technique after a difficult first round and was hardly bothered by Adegbuyi.

Adegbuyi shocked the fans in France during the first round, dominating the champion with excellent power punches and a great jab. He showed no fear whatsoever for Verhoeven and used his advantage in reach to perfection, even rocking the Dutchman with one good shot. Verhoeven countered with great kicks in the second round, forcing Adegbuyi to move more and negate the jab. Adegbuyi missed several big shots, and his punching rate dropped considerably. Adegbuyi tired quickly in the third, as Verhoeven started finding his range and speeding up. His corner urged him on to keep moving, taking advantage of Adegbuyi's relative inexperience and evening's tendency to rely on his boxing too much.

He fought mixed martial artist Alexandr Soldatkin at Tatneft Cup 2015 Final on September 4, 2015. Adegbuyi defeated Soldatkin in the third round via TKO.

==== 2015 GLORY Heavyweight Contender Tournament winner ====
On October 9, 2015, Benjamin Adegbuyi defeated Jahfarr Wilnis by split decision and Mladen Brestovac by TKO to earn the Ramon Dekkers memorial trophy and get a second crack at GLORY heavyweight champion Rico Verhoeven.

In the semifinal, Adegbuyi chopped down Mladen Brestovac using a relentless leg-kick attack on him to take his bout. Adegbuyi landed 65 leg kicks and systematically wore down his opponent before stopping him in the third round. A hard whacking kick to Brestovac's left thigh sent him to the canvas. Brestovac tried to rise to his feet, but he wasn't there long. Adegbuyi relentlessly attacked Brestovac's injured lower half until his opponent took a knee and gave up the fight. Undercard Superstar complimented Brestovac's effort but acknowledged Adegbuyi's skill level and physical prowess.

In one of the best heavyweight kickboxing bouts of 2015, Adegbuyi pulled out a split-decision victory over Jahfarr Wilnis to claim the tournament finals championship. In the first round, Adegbuyi looked to do some great work with leg kicks, but Wilnis' combination punches were a factor as well. The ebb and flow was gone in the second round. It looked to be all Wilnis. He had more energy and his level of activity seemed to shut Adegbuyi down. Just when it seemed as if Wilnis would run away with the final round, Adegbuyi began to find a home for his straight right hand. The punch repeatedly slowed Wilnis down and apparently did enough to convince two judges that Adegbuyi deserved the third and decisive round, winning the heavyweight brawl in an impressive fight.

Adegbuyi lost by first-round KO in a rematch with Rico Verhoeven for the heavyweight title in the main event of Glory 26: Amsterdam on December 4, 2015.

==== Controversial loss against Guto Inocente ====
He lost a shocking split-decision to Guto Inocente in the main event of Glory 43: New York, after appearing to dominate two of the three rounds they had fought. The result was met with boos from the crowd when it was announced and Adegbuyi looked nonplussed. Having visibly rocked Inocente in the first and third rounds, he had been certain the decision was going his way. Unexpectedly, the judges saw the fight very differently from the majority of viewers, leaving Adegbuyi speechless at the official announcement and venting fury on Twitter shortly afterwards.

==== 2018 GLORY Contender Tournament ====
Adegbuyi participated in the 2018 Glory four man heavyweight tournament, alongside D'Angelo Marshall, Guto Inocente and Junior Tafa. In the semi-final bout he faced D'Angelo Marshall. Marshall looked to pressure and threw several flurries. Adegbuyi timed him coming into his range, during one of these flurries, and countered him with a right overhand, to knock Marshall out in just half a minute. He advanced to the finals, where he met Junior Tafa. Tafa lost his fight to Inocente, but advanced due to Inocente suffering a cut during their bout. Adegbuyi focused on landing leg kicks, and won the fight in the second round by TKO, after dropping Tafa three times with leg kicks.

==== 2018 GLORY Heavyweight Grand Prix ====
Following his contender tournament win, Adegbuyi fought Jahfarr Wilnis during Glory 58 in Chicago. Benjamin won the fight by a unanimous decision.

Adegbuyi then took part in the eight man Heavyweight Grand Prix. In the quarter finals he faced Arkadiusz Wrzosek. Adegbuyi dominated the entire fight, managing to drop the Polish fighter in round two, and a second time in round three. He won a unanimous decision (30-25, 30–25, 30–25).

Advancing to the semifinals, he once again fought Jahfarr Wilnis. While the first round featured outfighting and probing kicks, Adegbuyi looked to pressure in the second round, and managed to stagger Wilnis with an uppercut during one of the exchanges. In the third round, he knocked Jahfarr out with a head kick.

In the finals, Adegbuyi fought Jamal Ben Saddik. Ben Saddik pressured from the opening bell, and halfway through the first round, dropped Benjamin with a series of uppercuts. Adegbuyi was unable to stand in time to beat the ten count.

After losing the Grand Prix final, Adegbuyi returned to Glory after 11 months to fight a rematch with D'Angelo Marshall. He won the fight by a unanimous decision.

==== Adegbuyi vs. Hari ====
Adegbuyi was scheduled to fight Badr Hari on 20 June 2020 in Rotterdam. The fight was set to be a title eliminator. The bout was subsequently cancelled due to the COVID-19 pandemic, and the fight was rescheduled for Glory 76 on November 7, but fell through again, as Badr Hari contracted COVID-19. The fight was rescheduled for December 19. Adegbuyi won the fight by KO in the third round, finishing Hari with a kick to the body.

Hari started aggressively, looking for a knockout with heavy punches. Adegbuyi attempted to cover the shots and was countering. Mid round, Adegbuyi caught a good left, his opponent taking a step back. Hari looked affected. Adegbuyi pressed, using again kicks to keep the Dutch-Moroccan away. At the end of a balanced round, two judges scored the round for Hari while one gave it to Adegbuyi.

In round two, Hari slowed down. Adegbuyi kept stepping forward and continued throwing kicks. With 45 seconds left in the round, Hari tagged Adegbuyi with a right hook followed by a flurry of punches. The Romanian dropped, but beat the count and survived the round. Adegbuyi finished the round standing.

At the beginning of the final round, Hari again tried to put the pressure on his opponent but he was caught by an Adegbuyi right hand thrown from a southpaw stance. The Dutch-Moroccan was in trouble and was given a standing count. Hari did eventually stand up and the fight resumed, but only to be finished in the first exchange, courtesy of left body kick thrown by the Romanian, which sent Hari to the canvas for the second time, and this time bleeding from his nose he would not get up.

The next day, Glory vice-chairman Scott Rudmann revealed that Hari suffered a double break in his nose on knockout.

==== Adegbuyi vs. Plazibat ====
Adegbuyi was scheduled to fight a rematch with Jamal Ben Saddik at Glory: Collision 3 on October 23, 2021. The two previously fought at Glory 62: Rotterdam, in the finals of the 2018 Glory Heavyweight Contender tournament, with Ben Saddik winning by a first-round knockout. Adegbuyi was later rescheduled to face Antonio Plazibat at the same event. He lost the fight via knockout in round two.

==== Adegbuyi vs. Ben Saddik II ====
Adegbuyi faced Jamal Ben Saddik in a rematch and an eliminator for the interim Glory heavyweight championship at Glory 81: Ben Saddik vs. Adegbuyi 2 on August 20, 2022. He was defeated by knockout in the first round. On February 8, 2023, it was announced that Ben Saddik had tested positive for performance enhancing drugs. As a result, his victory over Adegbuyi was overturned to a no contest. Ben Saddik was also suspended for 15 months, beginning with August 20.

==== Glory Last Heavyweight Standing Tournament ====
Adegbuyi takes part in the Glory 99 “Heavyweight Last Man Standing Tournament” where 32 heavyweight fighters compete on April 5, 2025 in Rotterdam, Netherlands.

== Training and fighting style ==
Adegbuyi has been training in his native Romania for most of his career, currently still in the capital Bucharest but also at Superpro Team in Sibiu, Transylvania for boxing. He first went to Respect Gym, which was run by Alin Panaite, where he trained with fellow kickboxers Andrei Stoica, Bogdan Stoica, Claudiu Bădoi, Ciprian Șchiopu and Florin Lupu.

Since 2015, Adegbuyi has been training mainly in Zevenbergen, Netherlands under Dennis Krauweel at Superpro Sportcenter, with fellow kickboxers Rico Verhoeven, Dexter Suisse and Max van Gelder.

In 2015, Adegbuyi and Tyson Fury trained together in Manchester, England, in preparation for their fights at the Glory 24: Denver tournament and against Wladimir Klitschko respectively. Previously, in 2014, he helped prepare Alexander Gustafsson for his fight against Jimi Manuwa. Adegbuyi and Gustafsson praised each other.

He has power, fluidity and athleticism. In the last fights, he demonstrated the ability to explore a more diverse range of techniques, from vicious body-shots to devastating low kicks.

== Awards, records, and honors ==
- GLORY
  - 2018 Glory Heavyweight Grand Prix runner-up
  - 2018 Glory Heavyweight Contender Tournament winner
  - 2016 Glory Heavyweight Contender Tournament winner
  - 2015 Glory Heavyweight Contender Tournament winner
  - 2020 Fight of the Year vs. Badr Hari at Glory 76: Rotterdam
  - 2018 Fight of the Year vs. Jahfarr Wilnis at Glory 62: Rotterdam
  - 2018 KO of the Year nomination
  - 2014 Best New Talent runner-up
- SUPERKOMBAT Fighting Championship
  - 2012 SUPERKOMBAT World Grand Prix III Tournament Championship
  - 2014 International Fighter of the Year
  - 2011 Newcomer of the Year
- Combat Press
  - 2020 Comeback of the Year vs. Badr Hari
  - 2016 Fighter of the Year nomination
  - 2016 Comeback Fighter of the Year nomination
- All The Best Fights
  - 2020 Fight of the Year nomination vs. Badr Hari at Glory 76: Rotterdam
- Kickboxing Romania Awards
  - 2023 Career Achievement Award

== Kickboxing record ==
Kickboxing record
35 wins (20 (T) KOs), 11 losses (6 (T) KOs), 0 draws, 1 no ontest
Date	Result	Opponent	Event	Location	Method	Round	Time	Record
2026-05-30	Loss	(Bulgaria) Daniel Dinev	Senshi 31 - Gladiators	Plovdiv, Bulgaria	Decision (unanimous)	3	3:00	35-11-0 (1)
2025-04-05	Loss	(Nigeria) Tariq Osaro	Glory 99 - Last Heavyweight Standing, Opening Round	Rotterdam, Netherlands	TKO (punches)	1	1:59	35-10-0 (1)
2024-03-09	Loss	(Morocco) Nabil Khachab	Glory Heavyweight Grand Prix, Quarterfinals	Arnhem, Netherlands	Decision (unanimous)	3	3:00	35-9-0 (1)
2023-05-27	Loss	(Algeria) Sofian Laidouni	Glory 86	Essen, Germany	Decision (unanimous)	3	3:00	35-8-0 (1)
For Glory Heavyweight Grand Prix Qualifier (+95 kg/209.4 lb)
2022-08-20	NC	(Morocco) Jamal Ben Saddik	Glory 81: Ben Saddik vs. Adegbuyi 2	Düsseldorf, Germany	NC (overturned)	1	2:30	35-7-0 (1)
Originally a KO win for Ben Saddik; overturned after he tested positive for at least one prohibited substance.
2021-10-23	Loss	(Croatia) Antonio Plazibat	Glory: Collision 3	Arnhem, Netherlands	KO (punches)	2	0:24	35-7-0
2020-12-19	Win	(Morocco) Badr Hari	Glory 76: Rotterdam	Rotterdam, Netherlands	KO (body kick and punches)	3	0:50	35-6-0
Glory Heavyweight Championship Eliminator
2019-11-22	Win	(Curaçao) D'Angelo Marshall	Glory 71: Chicago	Chicago, USA	Decision (unanimous)	3	3:00	34-6-0
2018-12-08	Loss	(Morocco) Jamal Ben Saddik	Glory 62: Rotterdam, Final	Rotterdam, Netherlands	KO (left hook)	1	1:54	33-6-0
For the Glory Heavyweight Grand Prix (+95 kg/209.4 lb) Title.
2018-12-08	Win	(Suriname) Jahfarr Wilnis	Glory 62: Rotterdam, Semi Finals	Rotterdam, Netherlands	KO (head kick)	3	2:39	33-5-0
2018-12-08	Win	(Poland) Arkadiusz Wrzosek	Glory 62: Rotterdam, Quarter Finals	Rotterdam, Netherlands	Decision (unanimous)	3	3:00	32-5-0
2018-09-14	Win	(Suriname) Jahfarr Wilnis	Glory 58: Chicago	Chicago, USA	Decision (unanimous)	3	3:00	31-5-0
2018-02-16	Win	(Australia) Junior Tafa	Glory 50: Chicago - Heavyweight Contender Tournament, Final	Chicago, USA	TKO (low kicks)	2	0:34	30-5-0
Wins the Glory Heavyweight Contender Tournament.
2018-02-16	Win	(Curaçao) D'Angelo Marshall	Glory 50: Chicago - Heavyweight Contender Tournament, Semi Finals	Chicago, USA	KO (punch)	1	0:36	29-5-0
2017-07-14	Loss	(Brazil) Guto Inocente	Glory 43: New York	New York City, New York, USA	Decision (split)	3	3:00	28-5-0
2017-02-24	Win	(Brazil) Anderson Silva	Glory 38: Chicago	Hoffman Estates, Illinois, USA	Ext. R. decision (unanimous)	4	3:00	28-4-0
2016-11-05	Win	(Croatia) Mladen Brestovac	Glory 35: Nice, Final	Nice, France	Decision (unanimous)	3	3:00	27-4-0
Wins the Glory Heavyweight Contender Tournament.
2016-11-05	Win	(Netherlands) Hesdy Gerges	Glory 35: Nice, Semi Finals	Nice, France	Decision (unanimous)	3	3:00	26-4-0
2016-09-18	Win	(Netherlands) Steve Reezigt	ACB KB 7: Bloody Night	Cluj-Napoca, Romania	KO (right uppercut)	1	0:24	25-4-0
2016-07-02	Win	(Netherlands) Colin George	Respect World Series 2	London, England	Decision (unanimous)	3	3:00	24-4-0
2016-03-19	Win	(Moldova) Maxim Bolotov	Respect World Series 1	Madrid, Spain	Decision (unanimous)	3	3:00	23-4-0
2015-12-04	Loss	(Netherlands) Rico Verhoeven	Glory 26: Amsterdam	Amsterdam, Netherlands	KO (right hook)	1	2:14	22-4-0
For the Glory Heavyweight Championship.
2015-10-09	Win	(Suriname) Jahfarr Wilnis	Glory 24: Denver - Heavyweight Contender Tournament, Final	Denver, Colorado, USA	Decision (split)	3	3:00	22-3-0
Wins the Glory Heavyweight Contender Tournament.
2015-10-09	Win	(Croatia) Mladen Brestovac	Glory 24: Denver - Heavyweight Contender Tournament, Semi Finals	Denver, Colorado, USA	TKO (low kicks)	3	1:47	21-3-0
2015-09-04	Win	(Russia) Alexandr Soldatkin	Tatneft Cup 2015 Final	Kazan, Russia	TKO (referee stoppage)	3	2:59	20-3-0
2015-06-05	Loss	(Netherlands) Rico Verhoeven	Glory 22: Lille	Lille, France	Decision (unanimous)	5	3:00	19-3-0
For the Glory Heavyweight Championship.
2015-03-07	Win	(France) Daniel Lentie	SUPERKOMBAT World Grand Prix I 2015	Ploiești, Romania	Decision (unanimous)	3	3:00	19-2-0
2014-11-07	Win	(Netherlands) Hesdy Gerges	Glory 18: Oklahoma	Shawnee, Oklahoma, USA	Decision (unanimous)	3	3:00	18-2-0
Glory Heavyweight Title eliminator.
2014-05-03	Win	(United Kingdom) Daniel Sam	Glory 16: Denver	Broomfield, Colorado, USA	KO (right cross)	2	2:59	17-2-0
2014-03-08	Win	(Ukraine) Dmytro Bezus	Glory 14: Zagreb	Zagreb, Croatia	TKO (referee stoppage)	2	1:53	16-2-0
2013-12-21	Win	(Ukraine) Pavel Zhuravlev	SUPERKOMBAT World Grand Prix 2013 Final	Galati, Romania	KO (right hook)	3	1:20	15-2-0
2013-09-28	Win	(Netherlands) Reamon Welboren	SUPERKOMBAT World Grand Prix III 2013	Botoșani, Romania	Decision (unanimous)	3	3:00	14-2-0
2013-08-08	Win	(Suriname) Ismael Londt	Slamm!! Soema Na Basi IV	Paramaribo, Suriname	Decision (unanimous)	3	3:00	13-2-0
2013-05-18	Win	(Suriname) Jairzinho Rozenstruik	SUPERKOMBAT World Grand Prix II 2013	Craiova, Romania	Decision (unanimous)	3	3:00	12-2-0
2013-04-06	Win	(Morocco) Mohamed Bellazar	SUPERKOMBAT World Grand Prix I 2013	Oradea, Romania	TKO (leg injury)	1	N/A	11-2-0
2012-12-22	Loss	(Ukraine) Pavel Zhuravlev	SUPERKOMBAT World Grand Prix 2012 Final, Semi Finals	Bucharest, Romania	KO (left hook)	1	0:25	10-2-0
2012-11-10	Win	(Ukraine) Sergei Lascenko	SUPERKOMBAT World Grand Prix 2012 Final Elimination, Quarter Finals	Craiova, Romania	TKO (referee stoppage)	1	N/A	10-1-0
2012-10-14	Win	(Iran) Jafar Ahmadi	K-1 World Grand Prix 2012 in Tokyo final 16	Tokyo, Japan	Injury (broken hand)	1	1:03	9-1-0
2012-07-07	Win	(Bulgaria) Kostadin Kostov	SUPERKOMBAT World Grand Prix III 2012, Final	Varna, Bulgaria	KO (right overhand)	1	N/A	8-1-0
Wins the SUPERKOMBAT World Grand Prix III 2012 tournament title.
2012-07-07	Win	(Croatia) Mladen Brestovac	SUPERKOMBAT World Grand Prix III 2012, Semi Finals	Varna, Bulgaria	Decision (unanimous)	3	3:00	7-1-0
2012-05-12	Win	(Germany) Patrick Liedert	SUPERKOMBAT World Grand Prix II 2012, Reserve Fight	Cluj Napoca, Romania	KO (liver punches)	3	0:46	6-1-0
2012-03-30	Win	(Serbia) Srdjan Seles	Local Kombat: Bodyguardul - Forţe Speciale	Târgu Jiu, Romania	TKO (referee stoppage)	3	2:58	5-1-0
2011-11-19	Loss	(Suriname) Jairzinho Rozenstruik	SUPERKOMBAT World Grand Prix 2011 Final, Reserve Fight	Darmstadt, Germany	KO (left hook)	2	1:37	4-1-0
2011-10-01	Win	(Slovakia) Martin Hauser	SUPERKOMBAT World Grand Prix III 2011	Brăila, Romania	KO (right hook)	1	2:35	4-0-0
2011-07-16	Win	(France) Joachim Thomas	SUPERKOMBAT World Grand Prix II 2011	Constanța, Romania	TKO (referee stoppage)	2	1:35	3-0-0
2011-05-21	Win	(Czech Republic) Libor Polach	SUPERKOMBAT World Grand Prix I 2011	Bucharest, Romania	KO (punches)	1	2:57	2-0-0
2011-03-18	Win	(Bosnia and Herzegovina) Dženan Poturak	SUPERKOMBAT The Pilot Show	Râmnicu Vâlcea, Romania	KO (trip)	1	0:57	1-0-0
Legend: Win Loss Draw/no contest Notes

== Professional boxing record ==
5 fights	5 wins	0 losses
By knockout	3	0
By decision	2	0

No.	Result	Record	Opponent	Type	Round, time	Date	Location	Notes
5	Win	5–0	(Ukraine) Pavlo Krolenko	UD	8	11 Oct 2024	Brasov, Romania	
4	Win	4–0	(Croatia) Igor Mihaljević	UD	4	6 Jun 2019	Sala Sporturilor Horia Demian, Cluj-Napoca, Romania	
3	Win	3–0	(Georgia (country)) Aleksander Lepsveridze	KO	1 (4), 0:57	5 Jul 2018	Sala Polivalentă, Bucharest, Romania	
2	Win	2–0	(Croatia) Aleksandar Todorović	KO	1 (4), 2:53	16 Mar 2018	Hallmann-Dome, Vienna, Austria	
1	Win	1–0	(Georgia (country)) David Gegeshidze	TKO	1 (4), 2:48	11 Nov 2017	Sala Sporturilor Lascăr Pană, Baia Mare, Romania	

== Personal life ==
Adegbuyi claims Yoruba as his father's roots. His father is currently the dean of a polytechnic university in Nigeria.

He played a fighter in the action-oriented underground fighting film Forced to Fight (2011), starring Gary Daniels and Peter Weller.

In May 2013, Adegbuyi was found not guilty by the Supreme Court of Romania in the Yax nightclub brawl where a man was severely beaten. However, three people were sentenced after assaulting the bouncer.

Being married to Elena, he became a father in 2015 when his son Patrick was born.

On 25 May 2021, Adegbuyi was named an honorary citizen of Aiud in Alba County.

He is a fan of Steaua București.

== See also ==
- List of male kickboxers
