= Brian Douwes =

Dutch martial artist

- Born: 21 November 1987 (age 38); Beverwijk, Netherlands
- Other names: The Hitman / Bad Ass
- Height: 1.88 m (6 ft 2 in)
- Weight: 111.9 kg (247 lb; 17 st 9 lb)
- Division: Heavyweight / Light heavyweight
- Reach: 75.0 in (191 cm)
- Style: Muay Thai
- Team: Mike's Gym; Team Spirit Beverwijk
- Trainer: Mike Passenier
- Years active: 2004–present

Kickboxing record
- Total: 77
- Wins: 44
- By knockout: 25
- Losses: 32
- By knockout: 5
- Draws: 1
- Last updated on: 14 May 2023

Brian "Bad Ass" Douwes (born 21 November 1987 in Beverwijk) is a Dutch kickboxer fighting out of Team Spirit, formerly known as Top Team Beverwijk in Beverwijk. He competed in K-1, Enfusion Live, Superkombat and Glory.

As of 1 May 2017, he is ranked the #10 light-heavyweight in the world by Combat Press.

== Biography and career ==
Brian Douwes was born in Beverwijk, North Holland. He started training Muay Thai when he was 14 years old, under the guidance of former world champion Gilbert Ballantine, Hans Nijman, Dick Vrij. He made his K-1 debut on the undercard of K-1 World MAX 2006 Netherlands tournament against Sander Duyvis, winning the fight by unanimous decision.

Douwes made his breakthrough at the K-1 World GP 2008 in Amsterdam when he knocked out James McSweeney in the first round and entered the tournament as the reserve fighter after Freddy Kemayo had to pull out due to an injury. His opponent in the semi-finals was Zabit Samedov. Douwes took the fight to the extra round but lost the evenly fought battle by unanimous decision.

In 2008 he competed for Planet Battle in Macau, China where he was runner up, losing in the final to Thor Hoopman.

A year later he returned to Macau to compete in the Challenger Tournament and won the tournament by defeating three opponents that night.

In 2013 he competed in Enfusion Search for the Superpro.

He returned to winning ways with a KO win over Fikri Ameziane on 25 January 2014 at Enfusion Live 13 – Eindhoven, Netherlands. They pummeled each other at the center of the ring early in the first round. Trading continued in the second when a short right to the jaw of Ameziane made judge to count. Douwes finished the fight in the third round at 2:55 with a right hand that caught Ameziane as he came forward.

He defeated Srdjan Seles via decision at GFC Series 1 in Dubai, UAE on 29 May 2014.

In 2015 after he won the European WFCA title in 2014, he returned to the ring, winning against Tarik Khbabez and Jamal Ben Saddik.

In 2016 he had last minute calls to fight in Glory Kickboxing against Saulo Cavalari and Guto Inocente. Untrained and not prepared, he took the fight like a warrior, but he lost on points.

In 2017 and 2018 he continued to fight.

His next fight was scheduled for 17 February 2019, in a four-man tournament for World Fighting League.

In 5 April 2025, He takes part in the Glory 99 "Heavyweight Last Man Standing Tournament" where 32 heavyweight fighters compete in Rotterdam, Netherlands.

== Ganryujima ==
On 28 February 2015 at Differ Ariake in Tokyo, Japan Douwes participated in the first hybrid MMA tournament called Ganryujima and broadcast on Fuji 1 Sports. The idea of the tournament was basically like the Kumite in Bloodsport. He represented kickboxing alongside eight men from different fight styles: Judo, Karate, Capoeira, Senegalese Wrestling, Sumo, MMA, Shuai Jiao, and Combat Sambo. There was also an American footballer. Douwes won the tournament, defeating Kamen Georgiev (Combat Sambo), Han Wula (MMA/Shuai Jiao) and Amaramend Boldo (MMA/Sumo), all by first-round KO.

=== Ganryujima record ===
4 wins (4(T)KOs), 0 losses, 0 draws
| Date | Result | Opponent | Event | Method | Round | Time |
| 2015-07-18 | Win | (United States) Mighty Mo | Ganryujima 2 Tokyo | TKO | 1 | |
| 2015-02-28 | Win | (Bulgaria) Kamen Georgiev | GANRYUJIMA 1 Tournament First Round Tokyo | KO | 1 | |
| 2015-02-28 | Win | (China) Han Wula | GANRYUJIMA 1 Tournament semi-final Tokyo | KO | 1 | |
| 2015-02-28 | Win | (Mongolia) Amaramend Boldo | GANRYUJIMA 1 Tournament Final Tokyo | KO | 1 | |

== Titles and achievements ==
- 2017 A1 WCC Heawyweight Qualification Tournament runner up
- 2017 WFL Light Heavyweight Tournament Champion
- 2014 W.F.C.A. European K1 Super Heavyweight Champion +95 kg
- 2009 The Challenger tournament champion
- 2008 Planet Battle tournament finalist
- 2008 K-1 World GP in Amsterdam semi-finalist

== Kickboxing record ==
44 wins (25 KOs), 32 losses, 1 draw
| Date | Result | Opponent | Event | Location | Method | Round | Time |
| 2025-04-05 | Loss | (Azerbaijan) Bahram Rajabzadeh | Glory 99 | Rotterdam, Netherlands | TKO (3 knockdowns) | 1 | 2:41 |
| 2024-03-29 | Loss | (Bosnia and Herzegovina) Ahmed Krnjić | SENSHI 21 | Varna, Bulgaria | KO (high kick) | 1 | |
| 2024-04-20 | Loss | (Romania) Ionuț Iancu | DFS 22 | Baia Mare, Romania | Decision (unanimous) | 3 | 3:00 |
| 2023-05-14 | Win | (Brazil) Jairo Kusunoki | Kickboxing World Cup | Tokyo, Japan | TKO (referee stoppage) | 1 | 1:07 |
| 2021-10-23 | Loss | (Netherlands) Perry Reichling | Rings Gala | Netherlands | Decision | 4 | |
| 2021-04-24 | Win | (Czech Republic) David Vinš | Night of Warriors 17: Road to ONE | Prague, Czech Republic | KO | 2 | |
| 2020-03-07 | Win | (Netherlands) Fred Sikking | FightTime | Netherlands | TKO | 2 | |
| 2019-10-03 | Loss | (Germany) Danyo Ilunga | Steko´s Fight Night | Germany | Decision | 5 | |
| 2018-11-17 | Win | (Germany) | FightTime meets World Fight League | Netherlands | TKO | 3 | |
| 2018-05-26 | Win | (Suriname) Sergio Piqué | Rings Amstelveen | Netherlands | TKO | 2 | |
| 2018-03-25 | Loss | (Suriname) Clyde Brunswijk | World Fight League reserve tournament, final | Netherlands | Decision | 3 | 3:00 |
| 2018-03-25 | Win | (Netherlands) Achraf Houssini | World Fight League reserve tournament, semi-finals | Netherlands | TKO | 2 | |
| 2017-12-09 | Loss | (Brazil) Anderson Silva | Glory 49: Rotterdam | Rotterdam, Netherlands | Decision (unanimous) | 3 | 3:00 |
| 2017-09-29 | Win | (Netherlands) Fred Sikking | House of Pain | Alkmaar, Netherlands | Decision | 3 | 3:00 |
| 2017-05-13 | Loss | (Suriname) Donegi Abena | A1 World Combat Cup, Final | Eindhoven, Netherlands | Decision | 3 | 3:00 |
For the A1 WCC heawyweight qualification tournament title
| 2017-05-13 | Win | (Morocco) Nouh Chahboune | A1 World Combat Cup, Semi-Finals | Eindhoven, Netherlands | TKO | 1 | |
| 2017-04-23 | Win | (Suriname) Redouan Cairo | WFL - Champion vs. Champion, Semi-finals | Almere, Netherlands | Decision | 3 | 3:00 |
Wins WFL light heavyweight tournament (-95kg). Ibrahim El Bouni could not fight in the final due to an injury.
| 2016-03-19 | Win | (Morocco) Nassim Balhor | Fight Time | Haarlem, Netherlands | KO | 3 | |
| 2016-10-21 | Loss | (Brazil) Saulo Cavalari | Glory 34: Denver | Broomfield, United States | Decision (unanimous) | 3 | 3:00 |
| 2016-05-13 | Loss | (Brazil) Guto Inocente | Glory 30: Los Angeles | Ontario, United States | Decision (unanimous) | 3 | 3:00 |
| 2016-04-03 | Loss | (Suriname) Fabio Kwasi | WFL - Where Heroes Meet Legends, Semi-Finals | Hoofddorp, Netherlands | Decision | 3 | 3:00 |
| 2016-02-19 | Loss | (Ukraine) Pavel Zhuravlev | FFC22: Athens | Athens, Greece | TKO | 3 | |
FFC Light Heavyweight Championship -95 kg.
| 2015-11-28 | Win | (Morocco) Jamal Ben Saddik | A1 World Combat Cup 20 | Eindhoven, Netherlands | Decision | 3 | 3:00 |
| 2015-06-13 | Loss | (England) Daniel Sam | SUPERKOMBAT Special Edition | Spreitenbach, Switzerland | Decision (split) | 3 | 3:00 |
| 2015-04-12 | Win | (Morocco) Tarik Khbabez | World Fighting League | Hoofddorp, Netherlands | Decision | 3 | 3:00 |
| 2014-11-28 | Win | (Czech Republic) Luboš Raušer | Souboj Titánů, W.F.C.A. European Title | Plzeň, Czech Republic | Decision | 5 | 3:00 |
| 2014-09-27 | Loss | (Romania) Cătălin Moroșanu | SUPERKOMBAT World Grand Prix IV 2014 | Almere, Netherlands | Decision (unanimous) | 3 | 3:00 |
| 2014-09-13 | Win | (Netherlands) Kay Bult | House of Pain | Alkmaar, Netherlands | KO (left hook) | 1 | |
| 2014-06-22 | Win | (Netherlands) Martin Scholsberg | Fight 4 Victory Part II, | Breda, Netherlands | KO | | |
| 2014-05-29 | Win | (Serbia) Srdjan Seles | GFC Fight Series 1 | Dubai, United Arab Emirates | Decision | 3 | 3:00 |
| 2014-01-25 | Win | (Morocco) Fikri Ameziane | Enfusion Live 13 | Eindhoven, Netherlands | TKO | 3 | 2:55 |
| 2013-11-16 | Loss | (Netherlands) Patrick Veenstra | Glorious Hero's IV: Enfusion Live 10 | Groningen, Netherlands | Ext. r. decision (split) | 4 | 3:00 |
| 2013-09-12 | Loss | (United States) Warren Thompson | Enfusion 4: Search for the SuperPro, 1st Round | Ko Samui, Thailand | Decision (unanimous) | 3 | 3:00 |
| 2012-05-12 | Loss | (Romania) Daniel Ghiţă | Siam Gym Belgium presents It's Showtime 56 | Kortrijk, Belgium | KO (left hook) | 2 | |
| 2012-02-25 | Win | (Bosnia and Herzegovina) Dzevad Poturak | SuperKombat World Grand Prix I 2012, Reserve Fight | Podgorica, Montenegro | TKO (retirement) | 3 | 2:15 |
| 2011-10-16 | Win | (Netherlands) Jahfarr Wilnis | Uitslagen - Top Team Gala | Beverwijk, Netherlands | Decision | 3 | 3:00 |
| 2011-04-10 | Loss | (Netherlands) Rodney Faverus | There's Nothing Wrong By Being Strong | Aalsmeer, Netherlands | TKO (low kicks) | 1 | 3:00 |
| 2010-04-24 | Loss | (Latvia) Konstantin Gluhov | K-1 World Grand Prix Selection 2010 | Istanbul, Turkey | Decision (unanimous) | 3 | 3:00 |
| 2010-03-23 | Win | (Netherlands) Ricardo van den Bos | K-1 World MAX 2010 West Europe tournament | Utrecht, Netherlands | Decision (unanimous) | 3 | 3:00 |
| 2010-02-27 | Loss | (Netherlands) Lloyd van Dams | Amsterdam Fightclub: Rotterdam vs Amsterdam | Amsterdam, Netherlands | Decision (unanimous) | 3 | 3:00 |
| 2009-11-29 | Loss | (Netherlands) Ismael Londt | SLAMM "Nederland vs Thailand VI" | Almere, Netherlands | Decision (unanimous) | 5 | 3:00 |
| 2009-10-25 | Draw | (Netherlands) Raymond Welboren | Top Team Beverwijk presents: Freefight & Kickbix Gala | Beverwijk, Netherlands | Draw | 5 | 3:00 |
| 2009-06-27 | Win | (Morocco) Aziz Jahjah | Ring Sensation RS1 tournament | Rozenburg, Netherlands | Decision (unanimous) | 3 | 3:00 |
| 2009-05-30 | Win | (Turkey) Mehmet Ozer | The Challenger 2009 | Macau, China | Decision (unanimous) | 3 | 3:00 |
| 2009-05-30 | Win | (Iran) Ali Karbasi | The Challenger 2009 | Macau, China | Decision (unanimous) | 3 | 3:00 |
| 2009-05-30 | Win | (Australia) Michael Siebert | The Challenger 2009 | Macau, China | Decision (unanimous) | 3 | 3:00 |
| 2009-05-10 | Win | (Poland) Łukasz Jarosz | Angels of Fire V | Płock, Poland | KO (punches) | 3 | |
| 2009-04-11 | Loss | (Brazil) Anderson Silva | Amsterdam Fightclub | Amsterdam, Netherlands | Decision | 4 | 3:00 |
| 2009-03-08 | Loss | (Netherlands) Hesdy Gerges | Beatdown | Amsterdam, Netherlands | Decision (unanimous) | 3 | 3:00 |
| 2009-02-08 | Loss | (Belgium) Sebastien van Thielen | Fights at the Border presents: It's Showtime 2009 | Antwerp, Belgium | Decision (unanimous) | 3 | 3:00 |
| 2008-11-25 | Loss | (Australia) Thor Hoopman | Planet Battle II tournament final | Hong Kong, China | Decision (unanimous) | 3 | 3:00 |
| 2008-11-25 | Win | (Bosnia and Herzegovina) Dženan Poturak | Planet Battle II tournament semi-finals | Hong Kong, China | TKO (corner stoppage) | 2 | 3:00 |
| 2008-11-25 | Win | (Hong Kong) Alain Ngalani | Planet Battle II tournament quarter-finals | Hong Kong, China | KO (flying knee) | 3 | |
| 2008-10-05 | Win | (Croatia) Stipan Radic | Tough Is Not Enough | Rotterdam, Netherlands | Decision | 3 | 3:00 |
| 2008-07-05 | Loss | (Netherlands) Bob van Boxmeer | Amsterdam Fightclub presents | Amsterdam, Netherlands | Decision | 3 | 3:00 |
| 2008-06-26 | Win | (Japan) Nobutaka Baba | Planet Battle: Where Champions Collide | Hong Kong, China | TKO (doctor stoppage) | 2 | |
| 2008-05-30 | Win | (Curaçao) Sharlimar Zimmerman | Fight Gala | Curaçao | TKO (retirement) | 4 | |
| 2008-04-26 | Loss | (Azerbaijan) Zabit Samedov | K-1 World GP 2008 in Amsterdam | Amsterdam, Netherlands | Decision (ext. R) | 4 | 3:00 |
| 2008-04-26 | Win | (United Kingdom) James McSweeney | K-1 World GP 2008 in Amsterdam | Amsterdam, Netherlands | KO (left hook) | 1 | 1:10 |
| 2008-03-08 | Win | (Poland) Dawid Trolka | Angels of Fire III | Warsaw, Poland | KO (knees) | 1 | 2:23 |
| 2008-03-02 | Win | (Netherlands) Rody Troost | Slamm 4 "Nederland vs Thailand" | Amsterdam, Netherlands | TKO (low kicks) | 1 | |
| 2007-12-02 | Loss | (Suriname) Ginty Vrede | Time for Action | Nijmegen, Netherlands | TKO (injury) | 2 | |
| 2007-06-23 | Win | (Netherlands) Roy Dijkshoorn | K-1 World GP 2007 in Amsterdam | Amsterdam, Netherlands | KO (head kick) | 2 | 0:45 |
| 2007-05-13 | Loss | (Russia) Andrei Pozdnjakov | Fight Night | Veghel, Netherlands | Decision | 3 | 3:00 |
| 2007-03-24 | Win | (Netherlands) Dave Vader | It's Showtime 75MAX Trophy Final 2006 | Rotterdam, Netherlands | Decision | 3 | 2:00 |
| 2006-12-09 | Loss | (Morocco) Said el Jajaqui | Muaythai Gala | Amsterdam, Netherlands | Decision | 5 | 3:00 |
| 2006-10-15 | Win | (Netherlands) Rico Verhoeven | Gala in | Beverwijk, Netherlands | Decision | 3 | 3:00 |
| 2006-04-16 | Win | (Netherlands) Frank Melk | Diamonds of the Future | Amsterdam, Netherlands | Decision | 3 | 3:00 |
| 2006-03-26 | Win | (Netherlands) Sander Duyvis | K-1 MAX Netherlands 2006 | Utrecht, Netherlands | Decision | 3 | 2:00 |
| 2006-02-06 | Win | (Netherlands) Bart Steltenpool | FF/Muay Thai Gala | Oostzaan, Netherlands | TKO (kicks to the body) | 2 | |
| 2005-12-11 | Loss | (Palestine) Mo Boubkari | Rings Fight Gala "Men of Honor" | Utrecht, Netherlands | Decision | 3 | 2:00 |
| 2005-11-20 | Loss | (Netherlands) Roy Dijkshoorn | Rings Kickboxing Gala | Enschede, Netherlands | Decision | 3 | 2:00 |
| 2005-04-24 | Loss | (Netherlands) Bryan Berika | Everybody Gym Gala "Next Generation" | Naarden, Netherlands | Decision | 3 | 2:00 |
| 2004-10-24 | Win | (Netherlands) Hesdy Gerges | Fight Gala | Beverwijk, Netherlands | KO | 2 | |

== See also ==
- List of male kickboxers
- List of K-1 events
