= Sherman Smith (musician) =

Curaçaoan singer

Sherman Smith is well-known singer from Curaçao. His music has been in a number of international music charts, and is considered a prominent contributor to Kizomba music.

== See also ==
- Curaçaoans in the Netherlands
