= Jamal Ben Saddik =

Belgian-Moroccan professional kickboxer

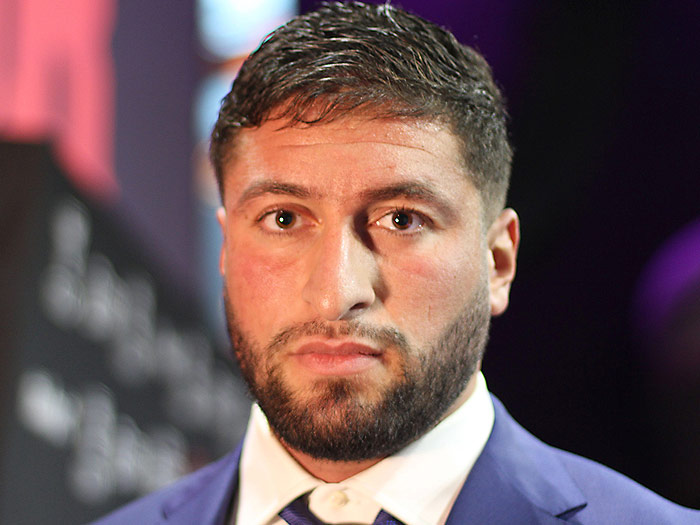
- Ben Saddik in 2016
- Born: 3 October 1990 (age 36); Antwerp, Belgium
- Other names: The Goliath
- Height: 2.05 m (6 ft 9 in)
- Weight: 119.6 kg (264 lb; 18 st 12 lb)
- Division: Heavyweight
- Reach: 80.0 in (203 cm)
- Style: Kickboxing
- Fighting out of: Utrecht, Netherlands
- Team: SB Gym (2024–present); Mike's Gym (2021–2024); Hemmers Gym (2012–2021); Golden Glory (2011–2012)
- Trainer: Said El Badaoui (2024–present); Mike Passenier (2021–2024); Nick Hemmers (2012–2021); Cor Hemmers (2011–2012)
- Years active: 2011–present

Kickboxing record
- Total: 51
- Wins: 38
- By knockout: 30
- Losses: 11
- No contests: 2

Other information
- Boxing record from BoxRec
- Last updated on: 20 August 2022

Jamal Ben Saddik (born 3 October 1990) is a Belgian-Moroccan professional kickboxer. He is a former two-time Glory Heavyweight Championship challenger and 2018 Glory Heavyweight Grand Prix tournament winner.

Combat Press ranked him as a top ten heavyweight between September 2015 and July 2021, peaking at No. 3.

In Glory, Ben Saddik was involved in doping controversies and was removed from the official rankings by the promotion in 2023. In 2015 and 2022 he emerged victorious in the bouts against Anderson Silva and Benjamin Adegbuyi, but were both cut short by Ben Saddik testing positive for banned substances and receiving suspensions, with the fights reversed to a 'no contest'. In 2024 Glory suspended Ben Saddik for doping for a third time.

== Background ==
Ben Saddik was born and raised in Antwerp. His parents emigrated to Belgium from the village of Bni Hadifa in northern Morocco. He was taken to a kickboxing gym at the age of 9 by his father, who feared life in the streets would have a negative impact on his son. As a teen, Ben Saddik was shot and grazed with a bullet after a street fight. He was a student of Cor Hemmers until 2021.

== Career ==
=== Early years ===
Ben Saddik fought in It's Showtime promotion on 6 March 2011, at Fightingstars presents: It's Showtime Sporthallen Zuid and knocked out Rico Verhoeven. He was then scheduled to fight Anderson Silva at Fightclub presents: It's Showtime 2011 on 21 May 2011, but the bout was scrapped when Silva was instead moved to the It's Showtime 2011 Lyon card to fight Daniel Ghiță.

He TKO'd Vitaly Oparin in round one at United Glory 15 on 23 March 2012, and followed this up with a fourth-round KO of Nikolaj Falin on 2 June 2012.

=== Glory ===
Ben Saddik lost a decision to Jahfarr Wilnis at Glory 2: Brussels on 6 October 2012.

But, despite this setback, he was invited to compete at Glory 4: Tokyo - 2012 Heavyweight Grand Slam, the biggest heavyweight tournament in kickboxing history, on 31 December 2012. He upset world #4 Errol Zimmerman at the opening stage, taking a decision. In the quarter-finals, he beat Remy Bonjasky on points, but lost via a quick body kick from Daniel Ghiță in the semis. Despite coming back from the tournament empty-handed, Ben Saddik's stock rose greatly by beating two much higher-rated fighters.

Ben Saddik fought Peter Aerts at Glory 8: Tokyo - 2013 65kg Slam on 3 May 2013, in Tokyo. He started well and floored Aerts in round one, but the Dutchman rallied back and dropped him three times in the second, forcing a referee stoppage.

He was knocked out late in round three by Ben Edwards in a slugfest at Glory 12: New York - Lightweight World Championship Tournament in New York City on 23 November 2013.

He was expected to fight Benjamin Adegbuyi at Glory 14: Zagreb in Zagreb, Croatia on 8 March 2014. However he broke his hand while training so he was replaced with Dmytro Bezus.

He knocked out Nicolas Wamba in round two at Glory 16: Denver in Broomfield, Colorado, US on 3 May 2014.

He lost via disqualification when he attacked a downed Hesdy Gerges just seconds into their bout at Qabala Fight Series #1 in Qabala, Azerbaijan on 29 June 2014. Following this incident, Glory suspended him for six months. Ben Saddik issued a public apology to both Gerges and fans of the sport.

==== First suspension and return ====
Ben Saddik rebounded from his DQ loss to Gerges with a first-round knockout win over Mamoudou Keta, during Glory 22. Ben Saddik won his next outing with Glory as well, defeating Anderson Silva by a third-round TKO. On 7 August 2015, it was announced that Ben Saddik failed a drug test prior to Glory 23: Las Vegas. He was suspended and fined $6,650 by Nevada State Athletic Commission until 8 August 2016. Ben Saddik must also submit clean drugs tests for steroids and diuretics at 30, 10 and 3 days before next fight in Nevada. As a result, his TKO win against Anderson Silva was changed to a no contest.

His next two fights were outside of Glory in the regional circuits. He was first scheduled to fight Brian Douwes during A1 WCC 20. Douwes won the fight by decision. His next fight was against Andre Schmeling during A1 WCC 21.

He also had one with ACB Kickboxing, against Gordon Haupt. Ben Saddik won by a first-round KO.

Returning to Glory, Ben Saddik won decision against Ismael Londt and Guto Inocente.

He was given a chance to fight Rico Verhoeven for the Glory Heavyweight title. Ben Saddik lost to Rico Verhoeven by TKO for the Glory World Championship 49 after his won fight in 2011. He was seen spitting in the face of Rico Verhoeven in a prefight press conference for which he was fined after the incident.

On 8 December 2018, he won the Glory 62 Heavyweight Contender tournament by knocking out Benjamin Adegbuyi in the first round of the final, after winning his fights against Junior Tafa and Guto Inocente in the quarter and semi-final respectively.

He signed a new, long term, contract with Glory in January 2020.

In October 2020, Glory announced Ben Saddik would fight a rubber match with Rico Verhoeven for the Glory Heavyweight title, although they didn't announce a date for the fight. The fight was later scheduled for Glory 77. He withdrew from the bout, 11 days before the event, due to a back injury.

Ben Saddik was scheduled to face Benjamin Adegbuyi at Glory: Collision 3 on 23 October 2021. The two of them previously fought at Glory 62: Rotterdam, in the finals of the 2018 Glory Heavyweight Contender tournament, with Ben Saddik winning by a first-round knockout. Ben Saddik was later rescheduled to face Rico Verhoeven at the same event, as a late replacement for Alistair Overeem, who was forced to withdraw due to an injury. Ben Saddik lost by fourth-round TKO.

Ben Saddik was booked to face the former Enfusion Heavyweight Champion and 2020 Glory 76 Heavyweight Tournament winner Levi Rigters at Glory 80 on 19 March 2022. The bout was cancelled minutes before starting, due to riots breaking out in the crowd.

==== Second suspension ====
Ben Saddik faced Benjamin Adegbuyi, in an eliminator for the interim Glory heavyweight championship, at Glory 81: Ben Saddik vs. Adegbuyi 2 on 20 August 2022. He made quick work of his opponent, as he won the fight by a first-round knockout. Ben Saddik knocked Adegubuyi down once prior to the stoppage.

In January 2023, Glory announced Ben Saddik is suspended since his fight with Benjamin Adegbuyi at Glory 81 on 20 August 2022, due to an investigation into a rule violation. It was revealed on 8 February 2023, that he had tested positive for performance-enhancing drugs. As a result, his victory over Adegbuyi at Glory 81 was overturned to a no contest. He was also suspended for 15 months, beginning with 20 August.

==== Third suspension ====
Glory imposed a six-month suspension on Ben Saddik for his actions at the semi-final match between Rico Verhoeven and Nabil Khachab during the Glory Heavyweight Grand Prix on 9 March 2024, which ran the risk of inciting violence and could have caused harm to participants, fans and officials.

==== Fourth suspension ====
Ben Saddik was suspended for 10 months for his violations of the anti-doping rules as a result of his positive sample collected out-of-competition on 19 February 2024. He tested positive for clomifene and its metabolite. The sample was analyzed at a WADA accredited laboratory.

The Anti-Doping Committee determined that a reduction from the default 12-month sanction was appropriate because Ben Saddik provided sufficient evidence that his use of clomifene was pursuant to a valid prescription from a physician to treat symptoms and his use occurred prior to the new ruleset going into effect. Ben Saddik's period of ineligibility began on 6 March 2024 and he will be eligible on 6 January 2025.

==== Return ====
After two and a half years of absence, on 22 February 2025, Ben Saddik was scheduled to face Uku Jürjendal at Glory 98 at RTM Stage in Rotterdam, Netherlands. Ben Saddik won the fight by knockout in the third round with a right head kick.

Ben Saddik took part in the Glory 99 “Heavyweight Last Man Standing Tournament” Opening round where 32 heavyweight fighters competed on 5 April 2025 in Rotterdam, Netherlands. He defeated Cristian Ristea by unanimous decision and qualified for the next round of the tournament happening at Glory 100 on 14 June 2025, where he faced Sofian Laidouni in the semifinals of a four-man tournament.

He was defeated by Sofian Laidouni in Glory 100 in the first round due to his intended high kick being blocked by Laidouni, who blocked it with his shin. It was stopped at 1:36 by the doctor, because Saddik's had a deep cut at the bottom of his shin which was more than 4 cm (1.5 inches) long from top to bottom en 3 mm (0.12 inches) wide and ruled a TKO for Laidouni.

Ben Saddik returned at Glory 103 against Levi Rigters. He lost via TKO in the third round, being dropped by spinning back kick to the body. He was unable to get to his feet, and was subsequently counted out, eliminating him from the tournament once again.

== Personal life ==
In 2012, he was diagnosed with thyroid cancer, which would emerge again around a year later. He was cancer-free for a good decade, until in 2024 he was diagnosed with cancer again and underwent a surgery.

=== Legal troubles ===
On 10 March 2021, he was arrested in Antwerp, Belgium in a major operation targeting organised crime in Belgium and the Netherlands. Ben S. was referred to as the seller ('reseller') of the secured crypto devices. His lawyer emphasized though that the arrest had nothing to do with the trade or possession of prohibited substances such as cocaine (Operation Sky). On 12 March 2021, the Mechelen Council Chamber ordered Ben Saddik to be jailed for 30 days. His attorney immediately filed an appeal. The appeal will be decided in 14 days by the Antwerp Court of Appeal.

On 28 June 2024, the Antwerp Criminal Court sentenced Ben Saddik to 40 months in prison and a fine of 40,000 euros for money laundering and fraud.

On 6 July 2024, he was arrested for ordering the kidnapping and assault of a dockworker from Antwerp in the drug world.

== Championships and accomplishments ==
- Glory
  - 2018 Glory Heavyweight Grand Prix winner
  - 2021 Glory Fight of the Year (vs. Rico Verhoeven)

Awards

- CombatPress.com
  - 2015 "Comeback of the Year"
  - 2018 "Comeback Fighter of the Year"

== Kickboxing record ==
Professional kickboxing record
38 wins (30 KOs), 11 losses, 2 no contests
Date	Result	Opponent	Event	Location	Method	Round	Time
2025-08-23	Loss	(Netherlands) Levi Rigters	Glory 103 - Last Heavyweight Standing Opening Round Phase 2	Rotterdam, Netherlands	KO (spinning back kick to the body)	3	1:41
2025-06-13	Loss	(France) Sofian Laidouni	Glory 100, Last Heavyweight Standing Qualification Round, Semifinals	Rotterdam, Netherlands	TKO (doctor stoppage)	1	1:36
2025-04-05	Win	(Romania) Cristian Ristea	Glory 99 - Last Heavyweight Standing, Opening Round	Rotterdam, Netherlands	Decision (unanimous)	3	3:00
2025-02-22	Win	(Estonia) Uku Jürjendal	Glory 98	Rotterdam, Netherlands	KO (high kick)	3	2:59
2022-08-20	NC	(Romania) Benjamin Adegbuyi	Glory 81: Ben Saddik vs. Adegbuyi 2	Düsseldorf, Germany	NC (overturned)	1	2:34
Originally a KO win for Ben Saddik; overturned after he tested positive for at least one prohibited substance.
2021-10-23	Loss	(Netherlands) Rico Verhoeven	Glory Collision 3	Arnhem, Netherlands	TKO (punches)	4	0:56
For the Glory Heavyweight Championship.
2018-12-08	Win	(Romania) Benjamin Adegbuyi	Glory 62: Rotterdam Final	Rotterdam, Netherlands	KO (left hook)	1	1:52
Wins the Glory Heavyweight Grand Prix (+95 kg/209.4 lb) Title.
2018-12-08	Win	(Brazil) Guto Inocente	Glory 62: Rotterdam Semi Final	Rotterdam, Netherlands	Decision (unanimous)		3:00
2018-12-08	Win	(Australia) Junior Tafa	Glory 62: Rotterdam Quarter Final	Rotterdam, Netherlands	TKO (2 knockdowns rule)	1	2:55
2018-09-29	Win	(Curaçao) D'Angelo Marshall	Glory 59: Amsterdam	Amsterdam, Netherlands	TKO (3 knockdowns rule)	1	0:57
2018-05-12	Loss	(Netherlands) Jahfarr Wilnis	Glory 53: Lille	Lille, France	Decision (unanimous)	3	3:00
2017-12-10	Loss	(Netherlands) Rico Verhoeven	Glory 49: Rotterdam	Rotterdam, Netherlands	TKO (head kick and punches)	5	1:10
For the Glory Heavyweight Championship.
2017-03-25	Win	(Brazil) Guto Inocente	Glory 39: Brussels	Brussels, Belgium	Decision (unanimous)	3	3:00
2016-12-10	Win	(Suriname) Ismael Londt	Glory: Collision	Oberhausen, Germany	Decision (unanimous)	3	3:00
2016-10-16	Win	(Germany) Gordon Haupt	ACB KB 8: Only The Braves	Hoofddorp, Netherlands	KO (right hook)	1	1:24
2016-05-28	Win	(Germany) Andre Schmeling	A1 World Combat Cup 21	Eindhoven, Netherlands	KO (right uppercut)	1	
2015-11-28	Loss	(Netherlands) Brian Douwes	A1 World Combat Cup 20	Eindhoven, Netherlands	Decision	3	3:00
2015-08-07	NC	(Brazil) Anderson Silva	Glory 23: Las Vegas	Las Vegas, Nevada, USA	NC (overturned)	3	2:55
Originally a TKO win for Ben Saddik; overturned after he tested positive for at least one prohibited substance.
2015-06-05	Win	(Belgium) Mamoudou Keta	Glory 22: Lille	Lille, France,	KO (punches)	1	1:59
2014-06-29	Loss	(Netherlands) Hesdy Gerges	Qabala Fight Series #1	Qabala, Azerbaijan	DQ (attack on a downed opponent)	1	0:20
2014-05-03	Win	(France) Nicolas Wamba	Glory 16: Denver	Broomfield, Colorado, USA	TKO (left hook)	2	1:24
2013-11-23	Loss	(Australia) Ben Edwards	Glory 12: New York	New York City, New York, USA	KO (right hook)	3	2:52
2013-05-03	Loss	(Netherlands) Peter Aerts	Glory 8: Tokyo	Tokyo, Japan	TKO (referee stoppage)	2	
2012-12-31	Loss	(Romania) Daniel Ghiță	Glory 4: Tokyo - Heavyweight Grand Slam, Semi Finals	Saitama, Japan	KO (liver kick)	1	0:35
2012-12-31	Win	(Netherlands) Remy Bonjasky	Glory 4: Tokyo - Heavyweight Grand Slam, Quarter Finals	Saitama, Japan	Decision (unanimous)	2	2:00
2012-12-31	Win	(Curaçao) Errol Zimmerman	Glory 4: Tokyo - Heavyweight Grand Slam, First 16	Saitama, Japan	Decision (unanimous)	2	2:00
2012-10-06	Loss	(Netherlands) Jahfarr Wilnis	Glory 2: Brussels	Brussels, Belgium	Decision (unanimous)	3	3:00
2012-06-02	Win	(Russia) Nikolaj Falin		The Netherlands	KO (punches)	2	
2012-03-23	Win	(Russia) Vitaliy Oparin	United Glory 15	Moscow, Russia	TKO	1	
2011-03-06	Win	(Netherlands) Rico Verhoeven	It's Showtime Sporthallen Zuid	Amsterdam, Netherlands	TKO (corner stoppage)	2	1:00
Legend: Win Loss Draw/no contest Notes

== See also ==
- List of male kickboxers
