= Jahfarr Wilnis =

Dutch Surinamese kickboxer (born 1986)

- Born: 26 February 1986 (age 40); Utrecht, Netherlands
- Height: 195 cm (6 ft 5 in)
- Weight: 111 kg (245 lb; 17 st 7 lb)
- Division: Heavyweight
- Style: Kickboxing
- Stance: Orthodox
- Fighting out of: Utrecht, Netherlands
- Team: SB Gym
- Years active: 2010 - present

Kickboxing record
- Total: 52
- Wins: 36
- By knockout: 10
- Losses: 15
- By knockout: 5
- Draws: 1

Other information
- Notable relatives: Jason Wilnis & Denzel Dumfries
- Boxing record from BoxRec

Jahfarr Wilnis (born 26 February 1986) is a Dutch-Surinamese kickboxer, currently competing in the heavyweight division of Glory. He is the 2015 Kunlun Fight Super Heavyweight Tournament winner and the former Enfusion Heavyweight World Champion.

Combat Press ranked him in the heavyweight top ten between July 2015 and December 2017.

== Professional kickboxing career ==
=== Early career ===
Winis faced Jairzinho Rozenstruik at K-1 World MAX 2010 West Europe Tournament on 21 March 2010. The fight was ruled a decision draw. He split wins and losses over his next three appearances, as he suffered a stoppage loss to Mitchell de Ligny at Kickbox gala Amstelveen on 16 May 2010, rebounded with a decision victory over Rowan Tol at Slamm Fighting with the Stars on 29 August 2010, but failed to build on this success as he lost by decision to Brian Douwes at Top Team Gala on 16 October 2011.

Wilnis faced Marco Vlieger at Battle Arena (K-1) on 4 February 2012. He won the fight by decision. Wilnis next faced Antonis Tzoros at The Battle 3 on 9 June 2012. He once again won by decision. Three weeks later, at Music Hall & BFN Group present: It's Showtime 57&58, Wilnis faced Sam Tevette. He won the fight by a third-round knockout.

=== Glory ===
Wilnis made his Glory debut against Jamal Ben Saddik at Glory 2: Brussels on 6 October 2012. He won the fight by unanimous decision. He would notch two more victories, stoppages of Oguz Ovguer at Glory 6: Istanbul on 6 April 2013 and Brice Guidon at Glory 10: Los Angeles on 28 September 2013, before his winning streak was snapped by Tomáš Hron at FFC08: Zelg vs. Rodriguez on 25 October 2013.

Wilnis faced Roman Kryklia at Kunlun Fight 21 on 17 March 2015, in the quarterfinals of the 2015 Kunlun Fight Super Heavyweight tournament. He won the fight by decision, after an extra fourth round was contested. The final two bouts of the tournament took place on the same day, at Kunlun Fight 26 on 7 June 2015. Wilnis overcame Asihati by a second-round knockout and advanced to the tournament finals, where he faced the former It's Showtime World Heavyweight champion Hesdy Gerges. He won the fight by an extra round decision.

Wilnis faced Valentin Slavikovski at Kunlun Fight 29 on 18 August 2015. He won the fight by unanimous decision. Following this victory, Wilnis returned to Glory to take part in the 2015 Glory Heavyweight Contender tournament and was booked to face Ben Edwards in the tournament semifinals, which took place at Glory 24: Denver on 9 October 2015. Although he was able to beat Edwards by a second-round technical knockout, he lost to Benjamin Adegbuyi by split decision in the finals of the one-day tournament.

Wilnis challenged the Enfusion Heavyweight World champion, Ismael Lazaar at Enfusion Live 37 on 27 February 2016. He won the fight by unanimous decision.

Wilnis faced Kirill Kornilov in the semifinals of the 2016 Glory Heavyweight Contender tournament, which took place at Glory 29: Copenhagen on 16 April 2016. He won the fight by unanimous decision and faced Ismael Londt in the finals. He lost the fight by split decision. Wilnis took part in another contender tournament at Glory 35: Nice on 5 November 2016, but suffered a first-round technical knockout at the hands of Mladen Brestovac in the tournament semifinals.

Wilnis made his first Enfusion Heavyweight title defense against Luis Tavares at Enfusion 53 on 30 September 2017. Tavares won the fight by unanimous decision.

Wilnis faced Jamal Ben Saddik at Glory 53: Lille on 12 May 2018. He won the fight by unanimous decision.

Wilnis faced Tomáš Možný in the quarterfinals of the 2018 Glory Heavyweight tournament, which took place at Glory 62: Rotterdam on December 8, 2018. He won the fight by unanimous decision and advanced to the semifinals of the one-day tournament, where he faced Benjamin Adegbuyi. He lost the fight by a third-round knockout.

Wilnis faced D'Angelo Marshall at Glory 67: Orlando on 5 July 2019. He lost the fight by unanimous decision. Wilnis next faced Antonio Plazibat at Glory Collision 2. He lost the fight by split decision.

Wilnis faced Georgil Fibic at Yangames Fight Night 8 on 27 August 2020. He won the fight by a third-round knockout. Wilnis first staggered his opponent with a jumping switch knee, before he floored him with a right hook.

Wilnis faced Michał Bławdziewicz at Glory 82 on 19 November 2022, following a two-year break from the sport. He won the fight by unanimous decision.

Wilnis faced Tariq Osaro in the semifinals of a four-man Glory heavyweight tournament at Glory 85 on 29 April 2023. He lost the fight by a second-round technical knockout.

== Championships and accomplishments ==
- Kunlun Fight
  - 2015 Kunlun Fight Super Heavyweight Tournament Winner
- Enfusion
  - 2016 Enfusion Heavyweight World Championship
- Glory
  - 2015 Glory Heavyweight Contender Tournament Runner-up
  - 2016 Glory Heavyweight Contender Tournament Runner-up
- World Fighting League
  - 2026 WFL Heavyweight Champion
    - One successful title defense
- World Kickboxing Union
  - 2026 WKU K-1 World Heavyweight Champion

== Kickboxing record ==
Professional kickboxing record
36 Wins (10 (T)KO's), 15 Losses, 1 Draw
Date	Result	Opponent	Event	Location	Method	Round	Time
2026-10-24	Win	(Germany) Andre Schmeling	K-1 World GP 2027 -90kg in Dortmund - World Fighting League	Dortmund, Germany	Decision (Unanimous)	5	3:00
Defends the World Fighting League Heavyweight title and captures the WKU K-1 World Heavyweight title
2026-06-27	Win	(Netherlands) Errol Koning	World Fighting League	Utrecht, Netherlands	TKO	3	
Wins the vacant World Fighting League Heavyweight title
2024-12-07	Loss	(Brazil) Bruno Chaves	Senshi 24	Varna, Bulgaria	Decision (Unanimous)	3	3:00
2023-04-29	Loss	(Nigeria) Tariq Osaro	Glory 85	Rotterdam, Netherlands	TKO (Punches)	2	1:26
2022-11-19	Win	(Poland) Michał Bławdziewicz	Glory 82	Bonn, Germany	Decision (Unanimous)	3	3:00
2020-08-27	Win	(Czech Republic) Georgil Fibic	Yangames Fight Night 8	Prague, Czech Republic	KO (Jumping knee + right hook)	3	
2019-12-21	Loss	(Croatia) Antonio Plazibat	Glory Collision 2	Arnhem, Netherlands	Decision (Split)	3	3:00
2019-07-05	Loss	(Curaçao) D'Angelo Marshall	Glory 67: Orlando	Orlando, USA	Decision (Unanimous)	3	3:00
2018-12-08	Loss	(Romania) Benjamin Adegbuyi	Glory 62: Rotterdam, Semi Finals	Rotterdam, Netherlands	KO ( Left head kick)	3	2:39
2018-12-08	Win	(Slovakia) Tomáš Možný	Glory 62: Rotterdam, Quarter Finals	Rotterdam, Netherlands	Decision (Unanimous)	3	3:00
2018-09-14	Loss	(Romania) Benjamin Adegbuyi	Glory 58: Chicago	Chicago, USA	Decision (Unanimous)	3	3:00
2018-05-12	Win	(Morocco) Jamal Ben Saddik	Glory 53: Lille	Lille, France	Decision (Unanimous)	3	3:00
2017-09-30	Loss	(Netherlands) Luis Tavares	Enfusion Live 53	Antwerp, Belgium	Decision (Unanimous)	5	3:00
Lost the Enfusion Heavyweight World Championship.
2016-11-05	Loss	(Croatia) Mladen Brestovac	Glory 35: Nice, Semi Finals	Nice, France	TKO (Left high kick)	1	2:06
2016-04-16	Loss	(Suriname) Ismael Londt	Glory 29: Copenhagen, Final	Copenhagen, Denmark	Decision (Split)	3	3:00
For the Glory Heavyweight Contender Tournament title.
2016-04-16	Win	(Russia) Kirill Kornilov	Glory 29: Copenhagen, Semi Finals	Copenhagen, Denmark	Decision (Unanimous)	3	3:00
2016-02-27	Win	(Morocco) Ismael Lazaar	Enfusion Live 37	Eindhoven, Netherlands	Decision (Unanimous)	5	3:00
Wins the Enfusion Heavyweight World Championship.
2016-01-09	Loss	(Ukraine) Roman Kryklia	Kunlun Fight 36	Shanghai, China	Decision	3	3:00
2015-10-09	Loss	(Romania) Benjamin Adegbuyi	Glory 24: Denver, Final	Denver, Colorado, USA	Decision (Split)	3	3:00
For the Glory Heavyweight Contender Tournament title.
2015-10-09	Win	(Australia) Ben Edwards	Glory 24: Denver, Semi Finals	Denver, Colorado, USA	TKO (Low kicks)	2	1:36
2015-08-15	Win	(Belarus) Valentin Slavikovski	Kunlun Fight 29	Sochi, Russia	Decision (Unanimous)	3	3:00
2015-06-07	Win	(Netherlands) Hesdy Gerges	Kunlun Fight 26, Final	Chongqing, China	Ext. R. Decision (Unanimous)	4	3:00
Wins the Kunlun Fight Super Heavyweight Tournament title.
2015-06-07	Win	(China) Asihati	Kunlun Fight 26, Semi Finals	Chongqing, China	KO (Right straight)	2	2:40
2015-03-17	Win	(Ukraine) Roman Kryklia	Kunlun Fight 21, Quarter Finals	Sanya, China	Ext. R. Decision	4	3:00
2015-01-03	Win	(Iran) Alireza Karbasi	Kunlun Fight 15: The World MAX Return, Final 16	Nanjing, China	TKO (Retirement)	2	0:35
2014-03-08	Loss	(Croatia) Mladen Brestovac	Glory 14: Zagreb	Zagreb, Croatia	KO (Left high kick)	1	1:19
2013-10-25	Loss	(Czech Republic) Tomáš Hron	FFC08: Zelg vs. Rodriguez	Zagreb, Croatia	Decision (Unanimous)	3	3:00
2013-09-28	Win	(France) Brice Guidon	Glory 10: Los Angeles	Ontario, California, USA	KO (Right hook)	2	0:38
2013-04-06	Win	(Turkey) Oguz Ovguer	Glory 6: Istanbul	Istanbul, Turkey	KO (Punches)	1	
2012-10-06	Win	(Morocco) Jamal Ben Saddik	Glory 2: Brussels	Brussels, Belgium	Decision (Unanimous)	3	3:00
2012-06-30	Win	(Senegal) Sam Tevette	Music Hall & BFN Group present: It's Showtime 57&58	Brussels, Belgium	KO	3	
2012-06-09	Win	(Greece) Antonis Tzoros	The Battle 3	Greece	Decision	5	2:00
2012-02-04	Win	(Belgium) Marco Vlieger	Battle Arena (K-1)	Zwevegem, Belgium	Decision	3	3:00
2011-10-16	Loss	(Netherlands) Brian Douwes	Top Team Gala	Beverwijk, Netherlands	Decision	3	
2010-08-29	Win	(Netherlands) Rowan Tol	Slamm Fighting with the Stars	Paramaribo, Suriname	KO	1	2
2010-05-16	Loss	(Netherlands) Mitchell de Ligny	Kickbox gala Amstelveen	Amstelveen, Netherlands	TKO (Punches and knee)		
2010-03-21	Draw	(Suriname) Jairzinho Rozenstruik	K-1 World MAX 2010 West Europe Tournament	Utrecht, Netherlands	Decision	3	3:00
Legend: Win Loss Draw/No contest Notes

== See also ==
- List of male kickboxers
