= Izaline Calister =

Dutch-Curaçaoan singer and songwriter

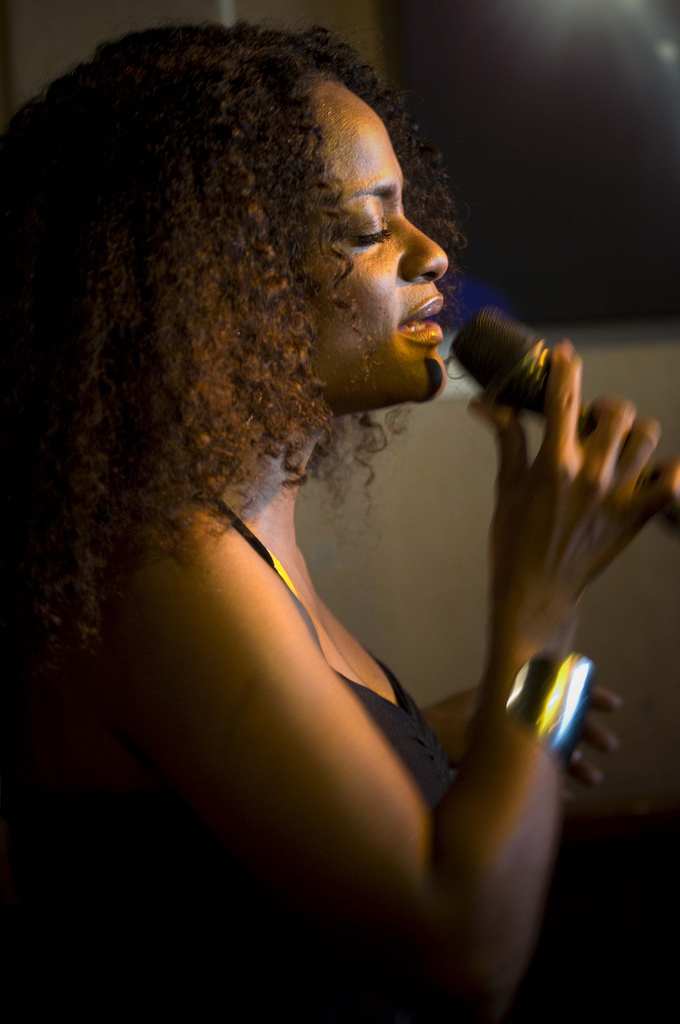
- Calister at Pol's Place For Jazz Bergen op Zoom, The Netherlands July 5, 2009

Background information
- Born: Izaline Francisca Juanita Calister; March 9, 1969 (age 57); Curaçao
- Genres: Jazz, Calypso
- Occupations: Musician, singer, songwriter
- Instrument: Vocals
- Website: izalinecalister.com

Izaline Francisca Juanita Calister (born March 9, 1969) is a Dutch-Curaçaoan singer-songwriter.

Growing up in her native Curaçao for eighteen years, Calister moved to Groningen, the Netherlands, where she studied at the Prince Claus Conservatoire and continues to live.

Calister's music combines the Calypso influences of her native Curaçao with jazz, creating a unique blend of music. These influences and musical features consist of rhythms, dances and songs from the island, of which she adapts and composes to accommodate her own unique style. She feels that her country is "both multicultural and creolized."

She performs at venues and festivals around the world.

== Awards ==
- Edison Award (2009)
