= Anderson Silva (kickboxer) =

Brazilian heavyweight kickboxer (born 1986)

Anderson Braddock
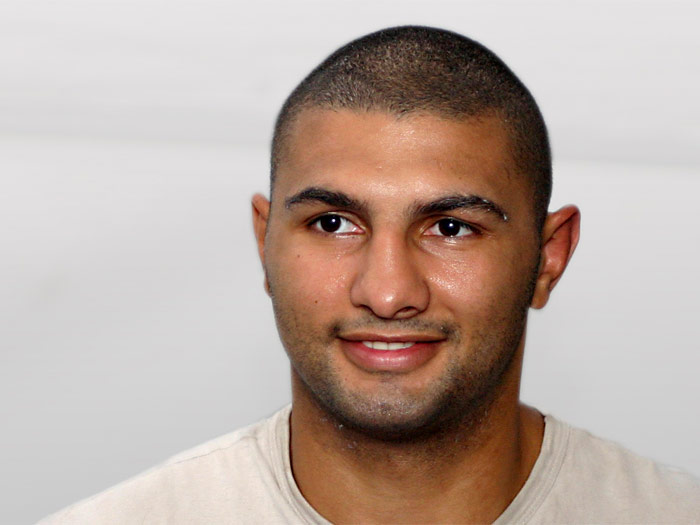
- Born: Anderson Manoel da Silva; August 29, 1986 (age 40); São Paulo, Brazil
- Height: 6 ft 3 in (191 cm)
- Weight: 259 lb (117 kg; 18 st 7 lb)
- Division: Cruiserweight; Heavyweight
- Reach: 75.7 in (192 cm)
- Style: Kickboxing
- Stance: Orthodox
- Fighting out of: São Paulo State, Brazil
- Team: Chakuriki Gym; Team Nogueira; RIZZO RVT
- Trainer: Thom Harinck; Peter Aerts; Pedro Rizzo; Minotauro Nogueira
- Years active: 2005–present

Kickboxing record
- Total: 68
- Wins: 46
- By knockout: 29
- Losses: 20
- By knockout: 6
- Draws: 1
- No contests: 1

Mixed martial arts record
- Total: 6
- Wins: 3
- By knockout: 2
- By submission: 1
- Losses: 3
- By knockout: 2
- By submission: 1

Other information
- Mixed martial arts record from Sherdog

Anderson Manoel da Silva (born 29 August 1986), better known as Anderson Braddock, is a Brazilian heavyweight kickboxer and mixed martial artist. He has competed in the It's Showtime, K-1, SUPERKOMBAT, ONE Championship, and GLORY.

Combat Press ranked him in the heavyweight top ten between September 2014 and April 2016.

== Biography and career ==
=== Early career ===
Silva began started his kickboxing career at Combat Sport gym in São Paulo, Brazil when he was around 12 or 13 years old. His fighters middle name "Braddock" comes from Col. James Braddock, from the movie Missing In Action. In 2007 Braddock was called up by Peter Aerts, as a sparring partner. Silva moved to Netherlands where he joined Thom Harinck's Chakuriki Gym and made his It's Showtime debut.

Silva took part in the 2009 VIP Fight Night Heavyweight tournament. He defeated Danyo Ilunga by a second round TKO in the quarterfinals, Patrick Liedert by a second round TKO in the semifinals, and faced Hesdy Gerges in the finals. Silva won the fight by TKO in the first round, as Gerges suffered a leg injury in the first round.

He next participated in the 2009 Amsterdam Fight Club four man tournament. Despite beating Brian Douwes by an extra round decision in the semifinals, he lost the final fight against Tomáš Hron by decision.

Anderson Braddock Silva vs. Cătălin Moroșanu in 2012

After a mixed record with the It's Showtime! promotion, during which he scored victories over Stefan Leko, Freddy Kemayo and Michael Duut, Silva participated in the SUPERKOMBAT Heavyweight World Grand Prix. He defeated Nikolaj Falin by unanimous decision in the semifinals, but lost a decision in turn to Cătălin Moroşanu in the finals.

Following the Badr Hari fight, he returned to Brazil to train at Team Nogueira.

=== Glory ===
He faced returning legend Remy Bonjasky at Glory 2: Brussels on October 6, 2012 in Brussels, Belgium. After a close three rounds, the bout was called a draw and went into an extension round. He faded and allowed Bonjasky to get the better of him, losing a majority decision.

He competed in the sixteen-man 2012 Glory Heavyweight Grand Slam at Glory 4: Tokyo - 2012 Heavyweight Grand Slam in Saitama, Japan on December 31, 2012. At the opening stage, he defeated Igor Jurković by TKO after dropping the Croatian twice in round one. He was then eliminated in the quarter-finals, however, when he fell victim to Gökhan Saki's left hook in the closing seconds of round one. This was the first stoppage loss of his career.

Braddock was scheduled to fight Singh Jaideep at Glory 8: Tokyo - 2013 65kg Slam on May 3, 2013 but the bout was cancelled.

He then faced Daniel Sam at Glory 9: New York - 2013 95kg Slam in New York City on June 22, 2013 and won by unanimous decision.

He lost to Daniel Ghiță by first round body kick KO in the semi-finals of Glory 11: Chicago - Heavyweight World Championship Tournament in Hoffman Estates, Illinois, United States in October 2013.

He defeated Remy Bonjasky by unanimous decision in a rematch at Glory 13: Tokyo - Welterweight World Championship Tournament in Tokyo, Japan on December 21, 2013.

He defeated Sergei Kharitonov via UD in the semi-finals before suffering a first-round TKO at the hands of Errol Zimmerman in the final of the Glory 16: Denver - Heavyweight Contendership Tournament in Broomfield, Colorado, US on May 3, 2014.

Moving away briefly from Glory, Anderson fought Sergei Kharitonov for the W5 World Heavyweight Title. Kharitonov won the fight by a second round TKO.

Returning to Glory, Silva achieved a mixed record, losing to Jamal Ben Saddik and Ismael Londt, but defeating Maurice Greene and Gordon Haupt. Despite alternating wins and losses, Silva was nevertheless given a chance to fight Rico Verhoeven for the Glory Heavyweight title. Verhoeven won the fight by TKO, after knocking Silva down three times in the second round.

Silva participated in the 2017 Glory Heavyweight Contender Tournament. He beat Giannis Stoforidis by TKO in the semifinals, but lost a unanimous decision to D'Angelo Marshall in the finals.

=== ONE Championship ===
In his first fight with ONE, Silva defeated Andre Meunier by a first round right hook knockout. He subsequently lost to Tarik Khbabez by unanimous decision.

Silva returned to winning ways with a first round TKO of Beybulat Isaev, but lost his next fight against Andrei Stoica by a first round knockout.

He is scheduled to fight Murat Aygün, as a late notice replacement for Roman Kryklia. Aygun won the fight by unanimous decision.

Silva made his return to mixed martial arts on September 24, 2021, facing BJJ world champion Marcus Almeida in the latter's MMA debut at ONE Championship: Revolution. He lost the bout in the first round via north-south choke.

Silva, as a late-notice replacement for Roman Kryklia, faced Iraj Azizpour at ONE Championship: NextGen on October 29, 2021. He lost the fight by unanimous decision.

Silva was scheduled to face Paul Elliott in a MMA bout at ONE Championship: Only the Brave on January 28, 2022 but it was cancelled.

Silva is scheduled to face Mikhail Jamal Abdul-Latif in a mixed martial arts contest at ONE 159 on July 22, 2022.

== Championships and accomplishments ==
=== Kickboxing ===
- Demolition Fight
  - 2007 Brazilian Cruiserweight Championship
- Glory
  - 2017 Glory Heavyweight Contender Tournament Runner-up
  - 2014 Glory Heavyweight (+95 kg/209 lb) Contender Tournament Runner-up
- VIP Fight Night
  - 2009 VIP Fight Night Tournament Champion
- SUPERKOMBAT Fighting Championship
  - 2012 SUPERKOMBAT World Grand Prix I Tournament Runner-up

== Kickboxing record ==
Kickboxing record
46 Wins (29 (T)KO's, 15 decisions), 20 Losses, 1 draw, 1 No Contest
Date	Result	Opponent	Event	Location	Method	Round	Time
2024-08-24	Win	(Brazil) Wesley Cottas	K-1 World GP 2024 in Brasília, Semifinals	Brasília, Brazil	Decision (Unanimous)	3	3:00
Silva withdrew from the tournament due to injury.
2024-08-24	Win	(Brazil) Jhonny Klever	K-1 World GP 2024 in Brasília, Quarterfinals	Brasília, Brazil	Decision (Split)	3	3:00
2021-10-29	Loss	(Iran) Iraj Azizpour	ONE Championship: NextGen	Kallang, Singapore	Decision (Unanimous)	3	3:00
2020-12-04	Loss	(Turkey) Murat Aygün	ONE Championship: Big Bang	Kallang, Singapore	Decision (Unanimous)	3	3:00
2019-12-09	Loss	(Romania) Andrei Stoica	ONE Championship: Mark Of Greatness	Kuala Lumpur, Malaysia	KO (Right Cross)	1	1:58
2019-09-06	Win	(Russia) Beybulat Isaev	ONE Championship: Immortal Triumph	Ho Chi Minh City, Vietnam	TKO (Punches)	1	2:19
2019-06-15	Loss	(Morocco) Tarik Khbabez	ONE Championship: Legendary Quest	Shanghai, China	Decision (Unanimous)	3	3:00
2019-04-12	Win	(Australia) Andre Meunier	ONE Championship: Roots of Honor	Manila, Philippines	KO (Right Hook)	1	1:14
2017-12-09	Win	(Netherlands) Brian Douwes	Glory 49: Rotterdam	Rotterdam, Netherlands	Decision (Unanimous)	3	3:00
2017-05-20	Loss	(Netherlands) D'Angelo Marshall	Glory 41: Holland, Final	Den Bosch, Netherlands	Decision (Unanimous)	3	3:00
For The Glory Heavyweight Contender Tournament.
2017-05-20	Win	(Greece) Giannis Stoforidis	Glory 41: Holland, Semi Final	Den Bosch, Netherlands	TKO (punches)	2	2:26
2017-02-24	Loss	(Romania) Benjamin Adegbuyi	Glory 38: Chicago	Hoffman Estates, Illinois, USA	Extra Round Decision (Unanimous)	4	3:00
2016-09-09	Loss	(Netherlands) Rico Verhoeven	Glory 33: New Jersey	Trenton, New Jersey	TKO (Referee Stoppage)	2	2:57
For the Glory Heavyweight Championship.
2016-07-22	Win	(Germany) Gordon Haupt	Glory 32: Virginia	Norfolk, Virginia, USA	KO (Liver Kick)	1	1:22
2016-04-16	Loss	(Suriname) Ismael Londt	Glory 29: Copenhagen - Heavyweight Contender Tournament, Semi Finals	Copenhagen, Denmark	Decision (Majority)	3	3:00
2016-02-26	Win	(United States) Maurice Greene	Glory 27: Chicago	Hoffman Estates, Illinois, USA	Decision (Unanimous)	3	3:00
2015-08-07	NC	(Morocco) Jamal Ben Saddik	Glory 23: Las Vegas	Las Vegas, Nevada, USA	No contest (overturned)	3	2:55
Originally a TKO win for Ben Saddik; overturned after Ben Saddik tested positive for at least one prohibited substance.
2014-10-11	Loss	(Russia) Sergei Kharitonov	W5 Grand Prix - Rematch	Moscow, Russia	TKO (Punches)	2	2:50
For the W5 World Heavyweight Title.
2014-05-03	Loss	(Netherlands) Errol Zimmerman	Glory 16: Denver - Heavyweight Contender Tournament, Final	Broomfield, Colorado, USA	TKO (Right Hook)	1	2:30
For the Glory Heavyweight Contender Tournament.
2014-05-03	Win	(Russia) Sergei Kharitonov	Glory 16: Denver - Heavyweight Contender Tournament, Semi Finals	Broomfield, Colorado, USA	TKO	3	3:00
2013-12-21	Win	(Netherlands) Remy Bonjasky	Glory 13: Tokyo	Tokyo, Japan	Decision (Unanimous)	3	3:00
2013-10-12	Loss	(Romania) Daniel Ghiță	Glory 11: Chicago - Heavyweight World Championship Tournament, Semi Finals	Hoffman Estates, Illinois, USA	TKO (Left Body Kick)	1	1:56
2013-06-22	Win	(United Kingdom) Daniel Sam	Glory 9: New York	New York City, New York, USA	Decision (Unanimous)	3	3:00
2012-12-31	Loss	(Turkey) Gökhan Saki	Glory 4: Tokyo - Heavyweight Grand Slam Tournament, Quarter Finals	Saitama, Japan	TKO (Left Hook)	1	2:00
2012-12-31	Win	(Croatia) Igor Jurković	Glory 4: Tokyo - Heavyweight Grand Slam Tournament, First Round	Saitama, Japan	TKO (Referee Stoppage)	1	1:29
2012-10-06	Loss	(Netherlands) Remy Bonjasky	Glory 2: Brussels	Brussels, Belgium	Extension round decision (Majority)	4	3:00
2012-05-27	Loss	(Morocco) Badr Hari	K-1 World MAX 2012 World Championship Tournament Final 16, Super Fight	Madrid, Spain	Decision (Unanimous)	3	3:00
2012-02-25	Loss	(Romania) Cătălin Moroşanu	SUPERKOMBAT World Grand Prix I 2012, Final	Podgorica, Montenegro	Decision (Unanimous)	3	3:00
For the SUPERKOMBAT World Grand Prix I 2012 tournament title.
2012-02-25	Win	(Russia) Nikolaj Falin	SUPERKOMBAT World Grand Prix I 2012, Semi Finals	Podgorica, Montenegro	Decision (Unanimous)	3	3:00
2012-01-28	Win	(Netherlands) Michael Duut	It's Showtime 2012 in Leeuwarden	Leeuwarden, Netherlands	Decision (Unanimous)	3	3:00
2010-12-18	Win	(France) Freddy Kemayo	Fightclub presents: It's Showtime 2010	Amsterdam, Netherlands	KO (Right High Kick)	1	1:17
2010-10-16	Loss	(Netherlands) Mourad Bouzidi	United Glory 12: 2010-2011 World Series Quarterfinals	Amsterdam, Netherlands	Decision (Unanimous)	3	3:00
2010-08-14	Win	(Brazil) Kleverson Silva	VI Desafio Profissional de Muay Thai 1ºRound	São Paulo, Brazil	Decision (Unanimous)	3	3:00
2010-05-29	Loss	(Netherlands) Mourad Bouzidi	It's Showtime 2010 Amsterdam	Amsterdam, Netherlands	Ext. R Decision	4	3:00
2010-04-17	Win	(Hungary) Tihamer Brunner	It's Showtime 2010 Budapest	Budapest, Hungary	Decision	3	3:00
2010-02-13	Loss	(Bosnia and Herzegovina) Adnan Redžović	It's Showtime 2010 Prague	Prague, Czech Republic	Decision (Unanimous)	3	3:00
2009-11-21	Win	(Netherlands) Dennis Stolzenbach	It's Showtime 2009 Barneveld	Barneveld, Netherlands	Decision (Unanimous)	3	3:00
2009-10-17	Win	(Germany) Stefan Leko	Ultimate Glory 11: A Decade of Fights	Amsterdam, Netherlands	KO (Punches)	2	N/A
2009-06-28	Win	(Germany) Andy Schadenberg	SLAMM!!: New Generation	Almere, Netherlands	Decision (Unanimous)	3	3:00
2009-05-31	Draw	(Netherlands) Lloyd van Dams	Next Generation Warriors 3	Utrecht, Netherlands	Draw	3	3:00
2009-04-11	Loss	(Czech Republic) Tomáš Hron	Amsterdam Fight Club, Final	Amsterdam, Netherlands	Decision	3	3:00
Fight was for Amsterdam Fight Club WMTA 4man tournament title.
2009-04-11	Win	(Netherlands) Brian Douwes	Amsterdam Fight Club, Semi Final	Amsterdam, Netherlands	Ext.R. Decision (Unanimous)	4	3:00
2009-03-21	Win	(Netherlands) Hesdy Gerges	VIP Fight Night 2009, Final	Neuss, Germany	TKO (Doctor Stop/Leg injury)	1	2:28
Wins VIP Fight Night 2009 tournament title.
2009-03-21	Win	(Germany) Patrick Liedert	VIP Fight Night 2009, Semi Final	Neuss, Germany	TKO (Referee Stoppage)	2	2:32
2009-03-21	Win	(Democratic Republic of the Congo) Danyo Ilunga	VIP Fight Night 2009, Quarter Final	Neuss, Germany	KO (Punches)	2	2:07
2009-02-15	Win	(Morocco) Tarik Charkoui	Noord Gestoord	Amsterdam, Netherlands	TKO (Ref Stop/3 Knockdowns)	1	N/A
2009-01-29	Win	(Netherlands) Tommy van Wijngaarden	Gala De Beuk	Oudenbosch, Netherlands	Decision	3	3:00
2008-10-05	Loss	(Czech Republic) Tomáš Hron	Tough Is Not Enough	Rotterdam, Netherlands	Decision (Unanimous)	3	3:00
Fight was for WIPU King of the Ring (-105kg) heavyweight title.
2008-05-07	Win	(Netherlands) Rodney Glunder	Amsterdam Fight Club	Amsterdam, Netherlands	Decision	3	3:00
2007-11-10	Win	(Brazil) Carlos Augusto Inocente	Demolition Fight 6	São Paulo, Brazil	Decision (Unanimous)	3	3:00
Wins Brazilian Cruiserweight (+84kg) title.
2006-09-23	Win	(Brazil) Jerônimo dos Santos	Demolition Fight 4	São Paulo, Brazil	TKO (Ref Stop/3 Knockdowns)	1	N/A
2006-04-08	Win	(Brazil) Douglas Boi	Demolition Fight 3	São Paulo, Brazil	TKO (Strikes)	1	N/A
2005-10-23	Win	(Brazil) Marcos Rogério	Demolition Fight 2	São Paulo, Brazil	TKO (Doctor Stoppage)	3	1:11
Legend: Win Loss Draw/No contest Notes

font-size:85%;

== Mixed martial arts record ==
Professional record breakdown
6 matches	3 wins	3 losses
By knockout	2	2
By submission	1	1

Res.	Record	Opponent	Method	Event	Date	Round	Time	Location	Notes
Loss	3–3	Alboury Domou Deke Bi	TKO (punches)	Gladiator 035	June 28, 2026	1	0:36	Osaka, Japan	For the vacant Gladiator Heavyweight Championship.
Loss	3–2	Marcus Almeida	Submission (north-south choke)	ONE: Revolution	September 24, 2021	1	2:55	Kallang, Singapore	
Win	3–1	Julio Cesar Lima	TKO (punches)	Watch Out Combat Show 50	May 19, 2018	1	0:44	Rio de Janeiro, Brazil	
Loss	2–1	Dritan Barjamaj	TKO (punches)	Shooto Switzerland: Horgen	June 17, 2017	2	2:01	Horgen, Switzerland	
Win	2–0	Luke Morton	Submission (arm-triangle choke)	HIT-FC 3	October 15, 2016	1	0:58	Zurich, Switzerland	
Win	1–0	Ruud Vernooij	TKO (punches)	HIT-FC 2	May 28, 2016	2	2:01	Zurich, Switzerland	Heavyweight debut.

== See also ==
- List of male kickboxers
