= Superkombat Fighting Championship =

Romanian kickboxing promotion

SUPERKOMBAT
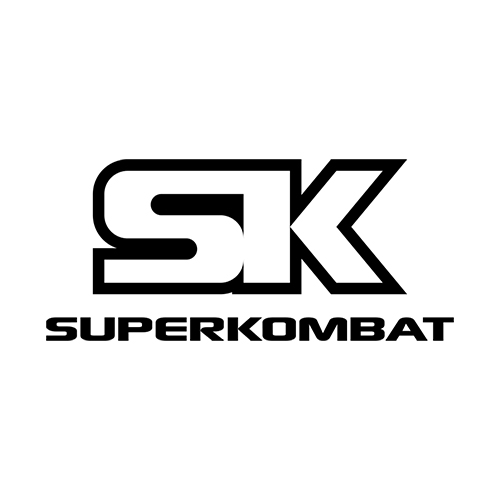
- Sport: Kickboxing
- Founded: 2011
- Founder: Eduard Irimia
- Folded: 2021; 5 years ago
- Country: Romania
- Headquarters: Bucharest, Romania
- Broadcasters: Eurosport; Combate Channel; FightBox; Fight Now TV; CBS Sports
- Website: superkombat.com Archived 2015-05-06 at the Wayback Machine

The Superkombat Fighting Championship stylized as SUPERKOMBAT or SK, was a Romanian kickboxing and mixed martial arts promotion based in Bucharest, Romania. The organization was considered one of the world’s top kickboxing organizations and at one point the largest kickboxing promotion in Europe, featuring some of the highest-level fighters in the sport on its roster.

Superkombat rose to prominence during the decline of the Japanese kickboxing giant K-1 in 2011. The next year, the organization partnered with K-1, assisting with event production, European talent recruitment and co-promoted K-1's 2012 event series in USA, Greece and Japan such as the K-1 World Grand Prix. Superkombat had partnerships with the World Kickboxing Network and WAKO for event sanctioning. Superkombat founder Eduard Irimia was awarded the Promoter of the Year 2011 by WIPU (World Independent Promoters Union) winning over Its Showtime and United Glory, an award who had previously been given to boxing promoter Don King. In 2016, the promotion held the Superkombat World Grand Prix IV 2016 which drew a record-setting attendance of 34,000 spectators in Comănești, Romania. This set a new European audience record for kickboxing, surpassing the previous mark of 25,000 set at the K-1 World Grand Prix 2007 in Amsterdam.

== History ==
Promoter Eduard Irimia built Local Kombat into a national sensation in Romania and in 2004 co-promoted in partnership with World Kickboxing Network, the first major world championship held on Romanian soil in kickboxing history. In 2009, Irimia made cover of the first issue of Forbes Romania magazine. Local Kombat eventually rebranded as Superkombat in 2011 and rose to global success during the decline of Japan's top kickboxing organization K-1 which catapulted Irimia to one of the most influential figures in kickboxing. Stephane Cabrera, President of the World Kickboxing Network stated that: "Kickboxing was completely unknown in Romania. Now their fighters are even more popular than football players. Eduard Irimia is now one of the biggest European promoters who makes a Superkombat show every month live on Eurosport, with a large and serious audience." Superkombat and Eurosport announced a three-year broadcast deal, and ultimately lasted until the end of 2016. Fight Now TV was the exclusive broadcaster in the United States and the partnership started with Superkombat World Grand Prix III 2013. On December 14, 2016, the promotion announced a one-year broadcast deal with CBS Sports, through its subsidiary CBS Sports Network, to air events in the United States. The deal included six events for 2017. In Brazil, Superkombat events were broadcast on Combate Channel from Globosat. FightBox aired Superkombat fights in over 40 countries around the world. The promotion was featured in the TV magazine program Eurosport Fight Club. Bob Sapp and Alexandru Lungu won Special Fight of the Year for their match at Superkombat World Grand Prix IV 2011.

On August 10, 2012, SK entered in a co-promotion agreement with Japanese-based kickboxing promotion K-1 was announced. Though the agreement would eventually end, SK president Eduard Irimia stated that while its company will be independent in 2013, it will still continue to have cooperation with any interested promotion, including K-1, by exchanging fighters. In November 2012, Superkombat announced that it would host a major mixed martial arts event in Bucharest, Romania. The competition was scheduled to take place on December 22 at the Polivalenta Hall and featured fighters from multiple countries. According to the organizers, the event was expected to attract a global audience and was part of Superkombat's strategy to expand its international presence.

In 2013, Superkombat expanded internationally through strategic support from Syrian-born entrepreneurs Basel and Khaled Fetrawi. Their involvement as official ambassadors contributed to the organization’s ability to host events in new markets such as Dubai and secure broader global broadcast distribution. The promotion donated all revenues from tickets sales for Superkombat World Grand Prix 2013 Final to flood victims in Galați County and in 2015 donated half of ticket sales for Superkombat World Grand Prix 2015 Final to Colectiv nightclub fire victims. The same year, Tarik Khbabez faced Roman Kryklia in the SUPERKOMBAT Heavyweight Grand Prix finals and won by decision. Superkombat champion Cătălin Moroșanu was scheduled to face Badr Hari at Global Fighting Championship Fight Series 4 in Dubai, but the fight never materialized. In 2018, the promotion only held one event named SUPERKOMBAT Dream at the Magic Place in Bucharest, Romania.

== Notable competitors ==
List of athletes who competed in :

- (Romania) Benjamin Adegbuyi
- (Romania) Sebastian Ciobanu
- (Romania) Sebastian Cozmâncă
- (Romania) Alexandru Lungu
- (Romania) Ionuț Iftimoaie
- (Romania) Cătălin Moroșanu
- (Romania) Amansio Paraschiv
- (Romania) Cristian Spetcu
- (Romania) Andrei Stoica
- (Romania) Bogdan Stoica
- (Angola) Henriques Zowa
- (Australia) Ben Edwards
- (Australia) Paul Slowinski
- (Azerbaijan) Zabit Samedov
- (Brazil) Alex Pereira
- (Brazil) César Almeida
- (Brazil) Thiago Michel
- (Brazil) Felipe Micheletti
- (Belarus) Igor Bugaenko
- (Belarus) Alexey Ignashov
- (Bosnia and Herzegovina) Dževad Poturak
- (Brazil) Anderson Silva
- (Democratic Republic of the Congo) Chris Ngimbi
- (Croatia) Mladen Brestovac
- (Croatia) Antonio Plazibat
- (Curaçao) D'Angelo Marshall
- (Czech Republic) Tomáš Hron
- (Czech Republic) Ondřej Hutník
- (Denmark) Christian Colombo
- (Spain) Jorge Loren
- (Spain) Frank Muñoz
- (France) Brice Guidon
- (France) Zinedine Hameur-Lain
- (France) Freddy Kemayo
- (France) Corentin Jallon
- (France) Nicolas Wamba
- (England) Jamie Bates
- (England) Daniel Sam
- (Germany) Stefan Leko
- (Greece) Mike Zambidis
- (Italy) Roberto Cocco
- (Italy) Mustapha Haida
- (Morocco) Faldir Chahbari
- (Morocco) Ibrahim El Bouni
- (Morocco) Tarik Khbabez
- (North Macedonia) Daniel Stefanovski
- (Netherlands) Brian Douwes
- (Netherlands) Hesdy Gerges
- (Netherlands) Albert Kraus
- (Netherlands) Fabio Kwasi
- (Netherlands) Fred Sikking
- (Netherlands) Rico Verhoeven
- (Netherlands) Errol Zimmerman
- (Suriname) Redouan Cairo
- (Suriname) Ismael Londt
- (Suriname) Cedric Manhoef
- (Suriname) Jairzinho Rozenstruik
- (Switzerland) Yoann Kongolo
- (Switzerland) Volkan Oezdemir
- (Tunisia) Yousri Belgaroui
- (Turkey) Murat Aygün
- (Ukraine) Roman Kryklia
- (Ukraine) Sergei Lascenko
- (Ukraine) Pavel Zhuravlev
- (United States) Tony Johnson
- (United States) Mighty Mo
- (United States) Bob Sapp

== Events ==
| # | Event | Date | Venue | Location | Attendance |
|---|---|---|---|---|---|
| 059 | Superkombat Dream | Mar 25, 2018 | Magic Place Grant | Bucharest, Romania | —N/a |
| 058 | Superkombat New Heroes 11 | Nov 24, 2017 | Aqua Blue | Târgoviște, Romania | —N/a |
| 057 | Superkombat In the Cage | Oct 30, 2017 | Lux Divina | Brașov, Romania | —N/a |
| 056 | Superkombat Expo | Sep 17, 2017 | Romexpo | Bucharest, Romania | —N/a |
| 055 | Superkombat World Grand Prix III 2017 | Aug 26, 2017 | Shenzhen Arena | Shenzhen, China | —N/a |
| 054 | Superkombat Special Edition II China | Aug 12, 2017 | Shenzhen Arena | Shenzhen, China | —N/a |
| 053 | Superkombat Special Edition China | Jul 29, 2017 | Shenzhen Arena | Shenzhen, China | —N/a |
| 052 | [Superkombat World Grand Prix II 2017 | May 6, 2017 | Palacio Vistalegre | Madrid, Spain | 6,000 |
| 051 | Superkombat World Grand Prix I 2017 | Apr 7, 2017 | Romexpo Dome | Bucharest, Romania | —N/a |
| 050 | Superkombat New Heroes 10 | Mar 12, 2017 | Berăria H | Bucharest, Romania | —N/a |
| 049 | Superkombat World Grand Prix 2016 Final | Nov 12, 2016 | Bucharest Arena | Bucharest, Romania | 3,000 |
| 048 | Superkombat World Grand Prix 2016 Final Elimination | Oct 1, 2016 | Iași Arena | Iași, Romania | 2,500 |
| 047 | Superkombat World Grand Prix IV 2016 | Aug 6, 2016 | Galleon Hill | Comănești, Romania | 34,000 |
| 046 | Superkombat World Grand Prix III 2016 | Jul 30, 2016 | Tenis Club Idu | Mamaia, Romania | 2,000 |
| 045 | Superkombat New Heroes 9 | Jun 25, 2016 | Brașov Olympic Ice Rink | Brașov, Romania | —N/a |
| 044 | Superkombat World Grand Prix II 2016 | May 7, 2016 | Romexpo Pavilion | Bucharest, Romania | —N/a |
| 043 | Superkombat World Grand Prix I 2016 | Mar 26, 2016 | Roberto Clemente Coliseum | San Juan, Puerto Rico | —N/a |
| 042 | Superkombat Special Edition Italy | Dec 12, 2015 | Pala Alpitour | Turin, Italy | 5,000 |
| 041 | Superkombat World Grand Prix 2015 Final | Nov 7, 2015 | Dinamo Hall | Bucharest, Romania | —N/a |
| 040 | Superkombat World Grand Prix 2015 Final Elimination | Oct 2, 2015 | Gran Teatro Linear4Ciak | Milan, Italy | 3,000 |
| 039 | Superkombat World Grand Prix IV 2015 | Aug 1, 2015 | Piațeta Cazino | Mamaia, Romania | 5,000 |
| 038 | Superkombat World Grand Prix III 2015 | Jun 19, 2015 | Constanța Arena | Constanța, Romania | 2,500 |
| 037 | Superkombat Special Edition Switzerland | Jun 13, 2015 | Umweltarena | Zürich, Switzerland | —N/a |
| 036 | Superkombat World Grand Prix II 2015 | May 23, 2015 | Bucharest Arena | Bucharest, Romania | 6,000 |
| 035 | Superkombat World Grand Prix I 2015 | Mar 7, 2015 | Olimpia Hall | Ploiești, Romania | 4,000 |
| 034 | Superkombat World Grand Prix 2014 Final | Nov 22, 2014 | PalaIper | Milan, Italy | 6,000 |
| 033 | Superkombat World Grand Prix 2014 Final Elimination | Oct 25, 2014 | Geneva Arena | Geneva, Switzerland | 4,000 |
| 032 | Superkombat World Grand Prix IV 2014 | Sep 27, 2014 | Topsportcentrum | Amsterdam, Netherlands | 3,000 |
| 031 | Superkombat New Heroes 8 | Aug 2, 2014 | Constanța Arena | Constanța, Romania | —N/a |
| 030 | Superkombat World Grand Prix III 2014 | Jun 21, 2014 | Constanța Arena | Constanța, Romania | 2,000 |
| 029 | Superkombat World Grand Prix II 2014 | May 24, 2014 | Europa Entertainment Center | Mamaia, Romania | —N/a |
| 028 | Superkombat World Grand Prix I 2014 | Apr 12, 2014 | Reșița Arena | Reșița, Romania | 2,000 |
| 027 | Superkombat New Heroes 7 | Mar 29, 2014 | Olimpia Hall | Ploiești, Romania | —N/a |
| 026 | Superkombat World Grand Prix 2013 Final | Dec 21, 2013 | Dunărea Ice Arena | Galați, Romania | 5,000 |
| 025 | Superkombat World Grand Prix 2013 Final Elimination | Nov 9, 2013 | Olimpia Hall | Ploiești, Romania | 2,500 |
| 024 | Superkombat New Heroes 6 | Nov 3, 2013 | Carrarafiere Convention Center | Carrara, Italy | 4,000 |
| 023 | Superkombat World Grand Prix IV 2013 | Oct 12, 2013 | Chauncey Hardy Arena | Giurgiu, Romania | —N/a |
| 022 | Superkombat World Grand Prix III 2013 | Sep 28, 2013 | Elisabeta Lipă Arena | Botoșani, Romania | 1,500 |
| 021 | Superkombat VIP Edition | Aug 31, 2013 | Sala Epika | Bucharest, Romania | —N/a |
| 020 | Superkombat New Heroes 5 | Aug 30, 2013 | Târgoviște Arena | Târgoviște, Romania | 3,000 |
| 019 | Superkombat New Heroes 4 | May 31, 2013 | Al Boom Tourist Village | Dubai, United Arab Emirates | —N/a |
| 018 | Superkombat World Grand Prix II 2013 | May 18, 2013 | Craiova Arena | Craiova, Romania | 2,000 |
| 017 | Superkombat New Heroes 3 | May 10, 2013 | Gasometer | Vienna, Austria | —N/a |
| 016 | Superkombat World Grand Prix I 2013 | Apr 6, 2013 | Antonio Alexe Arena | Oradea, Romania | 2,500 |
| 015 | Superkombat New Heroes 2 | Mar 3, 2013 | Ginásio Milton Feijão | São Paulo, Brazil | —N/a |
| 014 | Superkombat New Heroes 1 | Feb 23, 2013 | Hotel Kvarner | Rijeka, Croatia | —N/a |
| 013 | Superkombat World Grand Prix 2012 Final | Dec 22, 2012 | Bucharest Arena | Bucharest, Romania | 1,500 |
| 012 | Superkombat World Grand Prix 2012 Final Elimination | Nov 10, 2012 | Craiova Arena | Craiova, Romania | 5,000 |
| 011 | Superkombat World Grand Prix IV 2012 | Oct 10, 2012 | Galleria | Arad, Romania | 1,500 |
| 010 | Superkombat World Grand Prix III 2012 | July 7, 2012 | Kongresna Hall | Varna, Bulgaria | 4,000 |
| 009 | Superkombat World Grand Prix II 2012 | May 12, 2012 | Horia Demian Arena | Cluj-Napoca, Romania | 3,000 |
| 008 | Superkombat World Grand Prix I 2012 | Feb 25, 2012 | Morača Center | Podgorica, Montenegro | 7,000 |
| 007 | Superkombat World Grand Prix 2011 Final | Nov 19, 2011 | Böllenfalltorhalle | Frankfurt, Germany | 2,000 |
| 006 | Superkombat Fight Club | Nov 17, 2011 | Oradea Shopping City | Oradea, Romania | 2,000 |
| 005 | Superkombat World Grand Prix IV 2011 | Oct 15, 2011 | Piatra Neamț Arena | Piatra Neamț, Romania | 4,000 |
| 004 | Superkombat World Grand Prix III 2011 | Oct 1, 2011 | Danubius Arena | Brăila, Romania | —N/a |
| 003 | Superkombat World Grand Prix II 2011 | Jul 16, 2011 | Constanța Arena | Constanța, Romania | 3,000 |
| 002 | Superkombat World Grand Prix I 2011 | May 21, 2011 | Mihai Flamaropol Ice Arena | Bucharest, Romania | —N/a |
| 001 | Superkombat The Pilot Show | Mar 18, 2011 | Traian Hall | Râmnicu Vâlcea, Romania | 2,000 |

== Controversy ==
In 2016, an article by MMA Plus reported that several European kickboxing promotions, including Superkombat, were accused of withholding payments from fighters. In October 2016, Superkombat publicly addressed claims of non‑payment from fighters, stating delays stemmed from contractual complexities involving third‑party promoters and agents, while reaffirming its intent to resolve all outstanding purses.

== Awards ==
- World Independent Promoters Union (WIPU)
  - 2011 - Kickboxing Promoter of the Year (Runner ups GLORY and It's Showtime)

== See also ==
- GLORY
- It's Showtime
- K-1
- Dynamite Fighting Show
- Colosseum Tournament
