= 2017 in Romanian kickboxing =

The 2017 season was the 15th season of competitive kickboxing in Romania.

== List of events ==
#	Event Title	Date	Arena	Location
1	SUPERKOMBAT New Heroes 10	March 12, 2017	Berăria H	Bucharest, Romania
2	SUPERKOMBAT World Grand Prix I 2017	April 7, 2017	Romexpo Dome	Bucharest, Romania
3	SUPERKOMBAT World Grand Prix II 2017	May 6, 2017	Palacio Vistalegre	Madrid, Spain
4	Colosseum Tournament 2	June 17, 2017	Stadionul Ilie Oană	Ploieşti, Romania
5	Colosseum Tournament 3: Romania vs. Germany	July 14, 2017	Arena IDU	Mamaia, Romania
6	SUPERKOMBAT World Grand Prix III 2017	August 26, 2017	Shenzhen Arena	Shenzhen, China
7	SUPERKOMBAT Expo	September 17, 2017	Romexpo	Bucharest, Romania
8	Colosseum Tournament 4	October 16, 2017	Sala Polivalentă	Bucharest, Romania

== SUPERKOMBAT New Heroes 10 ==
SUPERKOMBAT New Heroes 10
- Promotion: Superkombat Fighting Championship
- Date: March 12, 2017
- Venue: Berăria H
- City: Bucharest, Romania

SUPERKOMBAT New Heroes 10 was a kickboxing event produced by the Superkombat Fighting Championship that took place on March 12, 2017, at the Berăria H in Bucharest, Romania.

=== Results ===
Main Card (FightBox)
Weight Class				Method	Round	Notes
Super Cruiserweight 95 kg	(Romania) Sebastian Cozmâncă	def.	(Sweden) Simon Ogolla	Decision	3	3:00
Heavyweight 96+ kg	(Romania) Robert Constantin	def.	(Romania) Mihaiţă Golescu	Decision	3	3:00
Light Heavyweight Plus 86 kg	(Romania) Cosmin Ionescu	def.	(Romania) Sebastian Ciobanu	Decision	3	3:00
Heavyweight 96+ kg	(Netherlands) Moriba Kosiah	def.	(Romania) Robert Orbocea	KO (left knee)	2	0:57
Light Heavyweight 81 kg	(Switzerland) Daniel Stefanovski	def.	(Romania) Alex Filip	TKO (referee stoppage)	3	0:21
Undercard (FightBox)
Heavyweight 96+ kg	(Romania) Valentin Bordianu	def.	(Romania) Marius Munteanu	Decision	3	3:00
Middleweight 72 kg	(Romania) Eduard Chelariu	def.	(Latvia) Andrejs Baranov	Decision (unanimous)	3	3:00
Light Heavyweight Plus 86 kg	(Romania) Dumitru Țopai	def.	(Romania) Adrian Cibu	KO (straight right)	1	2:52
Super Middleweight 77 kg	(Romania) Adelin Mihăilă	def.	(Sweden) Jian Amiri	Decision	3	3:00
Light Heavyweight Plus 86 kg	(Romania) Dragoș Imbrea	def.	(Romania) Ionuț Șandur	Decision (unanimous)	3	3:00
Heavyweight 96+ kg	(Romania) Alexandru Radnev	def.	(Romania) Cosmin Maxim	TKO (referee stoppage)	1	2:58

== SUPERKOMBAT World Grand Prix I 2017 ==
SUPERKOMBAT World Grand Prix I 2017
- Promotion: Superkombat Fighting Championship
- Date: April 7, 2017
- Venue: Romexpo Dome
- City: Bucharest, Romania

SUPERKOMBAT World Grand Prix I 2017 was a kickboxing event produced by the Superkombat Fighting Championship that took place on April 7, 2017, at the Romexpo Dome in Bucharest, Romania.

=== Results ===
Main Card (CBS Sports Network)
Weight Class				Method	Round	Notes
Heavyweight 96+ kg	(Poland) Lukasz Krupadziorow	def.	(United States) Tony Johnson	TKO (cut/doctor stoppage)	1	0:58
Heavyweight 96+ kg	(Romania) Robert Constantin	def.	(United Kingdom) Kaz Mwamba	Decision (unanimous)	3	3:00
Heavyweight 96+ kg	(Romania) Cristian Ristea	def.	(United Kingdom) Dawid Żółtaszek	Decision	4	3:00
Heavyweight 96+ kg	(Switzerland) Patrick Schmid	def.	(Romania) Valentin Bordianu	KO (overhand right)	2	1:43
Light Heavyweight 81 kg	(North Macedonia) Daniel Stefanovski	def.	(Spain) Imanol Rodríguez	Decision (split)	3	3:00	SUPERKOMBAT Light Heavyweight Championship eliminator
Undercard (FightBox)
Light Heavyweight 81 kg	(Morocco) Lotfi Amri	def.	(Romania) Bogdan Năstase	KO (left high kick and punches)	2	0:11
Light Heavyweight Plus 86 kg	(Romania) Dumitru Țopai	def.	(Greece) Marios Blanas	Decision (split)	3	3:00
Super Middleweight 75 kg	(Romania) Eduard Chelariu	def.	(Norway) Magnus Onyeka	Decision (unanimous)	3	3:00
Heavyweight 96+ kg	(Romania) Alexandru Radnev	def.	(Romania) Valentin Horjea	TKO (referee stoppage)	1	1:50
Light Heavyweight 81 kg	(Romania) Dragoș Imbrea	def.	(Romania) Claudiu Alexe	Decision (unanimous)	3	3:00

== SUPERKOMBAT World Grand Prix II 2017 ==
SUPERKOMBAT World Grand Prix II 2017
- Promotion: Superkombat Fighting Championship
- Date: May 6, 2017
- Venue: Palacio Vistalegre
- City: Madrid, Spain
- Attendance: 6,000

SUPERKOMBAT World Grand Prix II 2017 was a kickboxing event produced by the Superkombat Fighting Championship that took place on May 6, 2017, at the Palacio Vistalegre in Madrid, Spain.

=== Results ===
Main Card (CBS Sports Network)
Weight Class				Method	Round	Notes
Heavyweight 96+ kg	(Romania) Cătălin Moroșanu	def.	(Poland) Lukasz Krupadziorow	Decision (unanimous)	3	3:00
Heavyweight 96+ kg	(United Kingdom) Dawid Żółtaszek	def.	(Romania) Cristian Ristea	KO (flurry of punches)	2	0:49
Super Cruiserweight 95 kg	(Portugal) Bruno Susano	def.	(Netherlands) Clyde Brunswijk	KO (back kick)	1	1:45
Heavyweight 96+ kg	(Switzerland) Patrick Schmid	def.	(Cuba) Daniel Pérez	Decision (unanimous)	3	3:00
Light Heavyweight 81 kg	(North Macedonia) Daniel Stefanovski	def.	(Guinea-Bissau) Janilson da Cruz	TKO (referee stoppage/three knockdown rule)	1	1:05
Middleweight 73 kg	(Democratic Republic of the Congo) Nenés Nayanesh	def.	(Romania) Eduard Chelariu	Decision (unanimous)	3	3:00
Middleweight 73 kg	(Spain) Edye Ruiz	def.	(Morocco) Youssef El Hadmi	Decision (unanimous)	3	3:00
Super Middleweight 77 kg	(Spain) Manuel Romero	def.	(Israel) Omar Amash	Decision (unanimous)	3	3:00

== Colosseum Tournament 2 ==
Colosseum Tournament 2
- Promotion: Colosseum Tournament
- Date: June 17, 2017
- Venue: Stadionul Ilie Oană
- City: Ploieşti, Romania
- Attendance: 8,000

Colosseum Tournament 2 was a kickboxing event produced by the Colosseum Tournament that took place on June 17, 2017 at the Stadionul Ilie Oană in Ploieşti, Romania.

=== Results ===
Main Card
Weight Class				Method	Round	Time	Notes
95 kg	(Romania) Andrei Stoica	def.	(Slovakia) Ivan Bartek	Decision (unanimous)	3	3:00	
71 kg	(Romania) Amansio Paraschiv	def.	(Italy) Jordan Valdinocci	Decision (unanimous)	3	3:00	
75 kg	(Romania) Florin Lambagiu	def.	(Romania) Cristian Stoica	KO (left hook)	4	1:01	For the inaugural Colosseum Tournament World -75 kg Championship
95 kg	(Netherlands) Max van Gelder	def.	(Romania) Alexandru Stan	TKO (retirement/injury)	1	3:00	
65 kg	(Romania) Mihai Tudorie	def.	(Greece) Stefanos Mpaglatsakos	Decision (unanimous)	5	3:00	For the WKU Balkan -65 kg Championship
71 kg	(Romania) Cristian Milea	def.	(Greece) Giannis Boukis	Decision	3	3:00	

== Colosseum Tournament 3 ==
Colosseum Tournament 3
- Promotion: Colosseum Tournament
- Date: July 14, 2017
- Venue: Arena IDU
- City: Mamaia, Romania

Colosseum Tournament 3 (also known as Romania vs. Germany) was a kickboxing event produced by the Colosseum Tournament that took place on July 14, 2017 at the Arena IDU in Mamaia, Romania.

=== Results ===
Main Card (FightBox)
Weight Class				Method	Round	Time	Notes
70 kg	(Romania) Amansio Paraschiv	def.	(Germany) Tim Müller	KO (right punch)	3	2:58	For the AFSO Intercontinental -71 kg Kickboxing Rules Championship
70 kg	(Romania) Cristian Milea	def.	(Germany) Slawka Wittmer	Decision (unanimous)	3	3:00	
91 kg	(Romania) Dănuț Hurduc	def.	(Germany) Robin Salehi	TKO (referee stoppage/three knockdown rule)	1	2:57	
75 kg	(Romania) Adrian Roşca	def.	(Germany) Dũng Quàng	Decision (unanimous)	3	3:00	For the AFSO European -75 kg Kickboxing Rules Championship
75 kg	(Romania) Mădălin Crăciunică	def.	(Germany) Paul Leipi	Decision (unanimous)	3	3:00	
86 kg	(Romania) Costin Mincu	def.	(Germany) Fabio Canitano	KO (right low kick)	3	2:11	
70 kg	(Romania) Alexandru Voicu	def.	(Germany) Tobias Blumenstengel	Decision (unanimous)	3	3:00	

== SUPERKOMBAT World Grand Prix III 2017 ==
SUPERKOMBAT World Grand Prix III 2017
- Promotion: Superkombat Fighting Championship
- Date: August 26, 2017
- Venue: Shenzhen Arena
- City: Shenzhen, China

SUPERKOMBAT World Grand Prix III 2017 was a kickboxing event produced by the Superkombat Fighting Championship that took place on August 26, 2017, at the Shenzhen Arena in Shenzhen, China.

=== Results ===
Main Card (CBS Sports Network)
Weight Class				Method	Round	Notes
Heavyweight 96+ kg	(Croatia) Tomislav Čikotić	def.	(United Kingdom) Dawid Żółtaszek	Decision (unanimous)	3	3:00
Super Middleweight 75 kg	(China) Gao Xiang	def.	(Romania) Eduard Chelariu	KO (left punch)	2	1:55
Light Heavyweight 82 kg	(China) Sun Chao	def.	(Romania) Bogdan Năstase	TKO (referee stoppage)	1	1:21
Heavyweight 96+ kg	(Croatia) Antonio Plazibat	def.	(China) Lian Jie	Decision (unanimous)	3	3:00
Light Heavyweight 80 kg	(China) Chen Yawei	def.	(Romania) Alex Filip	TKO (elbow injury)	2	1:12

== SUPERKOMBAT Expo ==
SUPERKOMBAT Expo
- Promotion: Superkombat Fighting Championship
- Date: September 17, 2017
- Venue: Romexpo
- City: Bucharest, Romania

SUPERKOMBAT Expo was a kickboxing event produced by the Superkombat Fighting Championship that took place on September 17, 2017, at the Romexpo in Bucharest, Romania.

=== Results ===
Main Card (CBS Sports Network)
Weight Class				Method	Round	Notes
Lightweight 65 kg	(Romania) Cristian Spetcu	def.	(Morocco) Amed West	Decision (unanimous)	3	3:00
Heavyweight 96+ kg	(Switzerland) Patrick Schmid	def.	(United Kingdom) Aundre Groce	KO (right punch)	3	0:33
Light Heavyweight Plus 86 kg	(Italy) Giuseppe De Domenico	def.	(Romania) Cosmin Ionescu	TKO (doctor stoppage/broken nose)	1	0:38
Heavyweight 96+ kg	(Romania) Alexandru Radnev	def.	(Greece) Mikhail Karamusketas	Decision (unanimous)	3	3:00
Light Heavyweight Plus 86 kg	(Romania) Dumitru Țopai	def.	(Czech Republic) Ivo Zedníček	Decision (unanimous)	3	3:00
Light Heavyweight 81 kg	(Romania) Adelin Mihăilă	def.	(Colombia) Diego Mosquera	KO (left punch)	2	2:51
Middleweight 71 kg	(Bulgaria) Bogdan Shumarov	def.	(Romania) Mădălin Crăciunică	TKO (doctor stoppage/cut)	3	1:56

== Colosseum Tournament 4 ==
Colosseum Tournament 4
- Promotion: Colosseum Tournament
- Date: October 16, 2017
- Venue: Sala Polivalentă
- City: Bucharest, Romania
- Attendance: 5,000

Colosseum Tournament 4 was a kickboxing event produced by the Colosseum Tournament that took place on October 16, 2017 at the Sala Polivalentă in Bucharest, Romania.

=== Results ===
Main Card (FightBox)
Weight Class				Method	Round	Time	Notes
95 kg	(Romania) Bogdan Stoica	vs.	(Turkey) Fatih Karakuş	No contest	1	0:00	
95 kg	(Romania) Sebastian Cozmâncă	def.	(Moldova) Nicolai Garbuz	KO (left hook)	1	1:23	
72,5 kg	(Romania) Amansio Paraschiv	def.	(Italy) Ivan Naccari	TKO (doctor stoppage)	2	2:11	
71 kg	(Romania) Cristian Milea	def.	(Italy) Francesco Montuschi	Decision (unanimous)	3	3:00	For the Colosseum Tournament World -71 kg Championship
91 kg	(Romania) Marinică Bejenaru	def.	(Romania) Dănuț Hurduc	TKO (doctor stoppage/cut)	1	2:12	
75 kg	(Romania) Florin Lambagiu	def.	(Romania) Mirel Drăgan	TKO (three knockdowns)	1	1:51	
77 kg	(Romania) Claudiu Bădoi	def.	(Italy) Luca Migan	Decision (majority)	3	3:00	
86 kg	(Romania) Vlad Hurduc	def.	(Romania) Costin Mincu	KO (right punch)	1	2:50	
Heavyweight 96+ kg	(Romania) Remus Petrică	vs.	(Romania) Valentin Petruț	No contest (accidental elbow)	1	0:27	
86 kg	(Romania) Mădălin Mogoş	def.	(Romania) Alexandru Stan	TKO (referee stoppage/knockdown rule)	2	0:47	
65 kg	(Romania) Petrică Purcaru	def.	(Romania) Răzvan Mustață	Decision (unanimous)	3	3:00	
72,5 kg	(Romania) Andrei Ostrovanu	vs.	(Romania) Alexandru Voicu	Draw	3	3:00	
71 kg	(Romania) Marian Dinu	def.	(Romania) Florin Pîrtea	KO (right punch)	2	2:40	
Undercard
67 kg	(Romania) Vlad Trif	def.	(Romania) David Constantin	Decision	3	3:00	
77 kg	(Romania) Lucian Casoni	def.	(Romania) Leonard Popa	Decision (unanimous)	3	3:00	

== See also ==
- 2017 in Glory
- 2017 in K-1
- 2017 in Kunlun Fight
- 2017 in Glory of Heroes
- 2017 in Wu Lin Feng
