= Chauncey Hardy =

American basketball player

Chauncey Hardy (May 15, 1988 – October 9, 2011) was an American professional basketball player. He played for CSȘ Giurgiu in the Divizia A, the top-tier professional basketball league of Romania.

== Early life and education ==
Chauncey, a native of Middletown, Connecticut, previously played basketball for Sacred Heart University in Fairfield, Connecticut.

== Death and legacy ==
He died on October 9, 2011, in the Romanian city of Giurgiu, where he was severely beaten in a nightclub following an altercation with a group of men. Hardy arrived comatose in hospital and died following surgery. Before his death he had 3 heart attacks. A day later, a man was arrested after he surrendered to police; he was put in custody pending the trial.

The arena, Sala Chauncey Hardy, was named for Hardy.
