= Mohamed Amine =

Moroccan professional martial artist

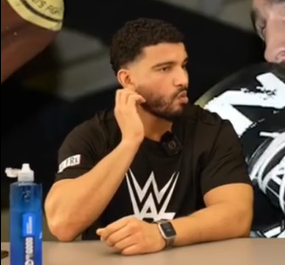
- Mohamed Amine in April 2025
- Born: Mohamed Amine Ait Bajja; December 3, 1996 (age 29); Amsterdam, Netherlands
- Nickname: Momine
- Nationality: Moroccan
- Height: 1.93 m (6 ft 4 in)
- Weight: 100 kg (220 lb; 15 st 10 lb)
- Division: Light Heavyweight; Heavyweight (2025–present)
- Style: Kickboxing
- Fighting out of: Ouarzazate, Morocco
- Team: Monster Gym
- Trainer: Serhan Akyol
- Years active: 2016–present

Kickboxing record
- Total: 39
- Wins: 31
- By knockout: 17
- Losses: 8
- By knockout: 3

Mixed martial arts record
- Total: 5
- Wins: 3
- Losses: 2

Other information
- Boxing record from BoxRec
- Mixed martial arts record from Sherdog
- Last updated on: April 27, 2024

Mohamed Amine Ait Bajja (born December 3, 1996) is a Dutch-born Moroccan professional kickboxer and mixed martial artist.

== Background ==
Mohamed Amine grew up in Amsterdam-West and was six years old when he started kickboxing at the El Otmani Gym. He later moved to Purmerend, and from the age of 16 trained under Bob Schrijber.

== Kickboxing career ==
=== Enfusion ===
Mohamed Amine competed for Enfusion in the earlier stages of his career. His first fight for the Dutch kickboxing brand was against French kickboxer Abderahmane Coulibaly, in which Mohamed Amine won from unanimous decision.

=== Glory ===
Mohamed Amine first competed for Glory in 2017, in a losing effort against Jakob Styben at Glory 45: Amsterdam undercard.

In 2023, Mohamed Amine returned to Glory. It took him six years before returning to a Glory ring, doing so at Glory 85. Mohamed Amine won a unanimous decision against Dutch kickboxer Michael Duut. He would compete in 2023 twice more in Glory, at Glory Collision 5 against fellow Moroccan kickboxer Tarik Khbabez, and Glory 87 against Bahram Rajabzadeh, which he both lost by TKO.

In 2024 Mohamed Amine fought trice at Glory 91 losing to Pascal Touré in a split decision. He continued his losing streak by losing to Cem Cáceres for a reserve spot in the Glory Light Heavyweight Grand Prix, losing out an opportunity to be crowned the Glory Light Heavyweight champion. He would finish off 2024 without a win, losing his final bout of the year against Mory Kromah at Glory 94.

After more than a year without competing in Glory, Mohamed Amine returned on October 11, 2025. Moving up to a weight class to heavyweight, Mohamed Amine broke his losing streak by beating Dutch kickboxer Errol Koning at Glory 104.

== Mixed martial arts career ==
Mohamed Amine made his mixed martial arts (MMA) debut in the Dutch regional scene. He debuted as an amateur against Carlo Vrolijken, in which Mohamed Amine won by submission in the second round at Akira FC 1 (also known as Fightclub Den Haag). A rematch would be scheduled one year later at Akira FC 2 as an official professional bout between the two, but Vrolijken ended up pulling out. Mohamed Amine would instead face against Polish mixed martial artist Dominik Dankowski, and would win his professional debut by KO in the first round.

=== Professional Fighters League ===
In 2023, it was announced that Mohamed Amine would compete for the Professional Fighters League (PFL), making his debut for a major MMA promotion. His first appearance for the promotion was in the main event of PFL Europe 1, losing to Simeon Powell by submission (arm-triangle choke).

In 2024, despite previously fighting under the PFL Europe banner, he was placed as part of the PFL MENA roster.

== Professional wrestling career ==
=== Early career (2023-2025) ===
Mohamed Amine has stated that he's been training for professional wrestling since 2023.

=== WWE (2025) ===
In April 2025, Mohamed Amine participated in a WWE talent selection session held in London during their tour of the United Kingdom, Ireland and France, ahead of Clash of Paris in August 2025. He was invited by WWE as part of the organization's efforts to recruit athletes from combat sports backgrounds across Europe. According to his management, he successfully advanced through the initial selection round, with further evaluation stages pending.

== Mixed martial arts record ==
Professional record breakdown
8 matches	5 wins	3 losses
By knockout	4	1
By submission	0	2
By decision	1	0

Res.	Record	Opponent	Method	Event	Date	Round	Time	Location	Notes
Loss	5-2	Simeón Powell	Submission (arm-triangle choke)	PFL Europe 1	25 March 2023	2	5:00	Newcastle upon Tyne, England	PFL debut, Light Heavyweight Quarter-Final
Win	5-1	Tomas Pakutinskas	TKO (corner stoppage)	KOK 108	22 December 2022	1	5:00	Kaunas, Lithuania	
Loss	4-1	Kevin Oumar	Submission (Americana)	UAE Warriors 27	25 March 2022	5	5:00	Abu Dhabi, United Arab Emirates	
Win	4-0	Leo Pla	Decision	Akira FC 4	4 December 2021	5	5:00	Den Haag, Netherlands	Won Fightclub Den Haag Light Heavyweight Intercontinental Championship
Win	3-0	Stanislav Romanov	TKO	Next Generation Warriors MMA	30 October 2021	2	3:24	Utrecht, Netherlands	
Win	2-0	Adnan Alić	TKO	Akira FC 3	26 September 2021	1	0:24	Den Haag, Netherlands	
Win	1-0	Dominik Dankowski	Knock-out	Akira FC 2	18 July 2021	1	3:00	Den Haag, Netherlands	Professional debut.

== See also ==
- List of male kickboxers
