= Teo Mikelić =

Croatian kickboxer

- Born: 24 August 1992 (age 34); Pula, Croatia
- Nationality: Croatian
- Height: 1.80 m (5 ft 11 in)
- Weight: 75 kg (165 lb; 11 st 11 lb)
- Division: Lightweight
- Style: Kickboxing
- Fighting out of: Pula, Croatia
- Team: Punch It Gym
- Years active: 2011 - present

Kickboxing record
- Total: 39
- Wins: 23
- By knockout: 10
- Losses: 16
- By knockout: 6

Teo Mikelić (born 22 August 1992) is a Croatian professional kickboxer, who formerly competed in World version W5, Glory and FFC promotion. From July to October 2017, he was ranked #8 lightweight world kickboxer by Liverkick.com.

== Kickboxing career ==
=== FFC ===
Mikelić made his professional debut against Rene Pavić at Opatija Fight Night 3 on 20 February 2011. He won the fight by a first-round knockout. Mikelić next faced his first foreign opponent, Mamadou Sly, at Mega Fight on 21 July 2012. He won the fight by unanimous decision.

After amassing a 3–0 record, Mikelić signed with Final Fight Championship. Mikelić made his promotional debut against the future FFC Lightweight champion Samo Petje at FFC06: Jurković vs. Poturak on 14 June 2013. He won the fight by unanimous decision. Mikelić faced Slobodan Kajmakoski at FFC10: Rodriguez vs. Batzelas on 13 December 2013, in his second appearance with the promotion. He once again won the fight by unanimous decision.

=== FFC & Glory ===
Mikelić made his Glory debut against Murthel Groenhart at Glory 14: Zagreb on 8 March 2014. He lost the fight by a first-round technical knockout, as the fight was stopped at the end of the round on the advice of the ringside physician, due to a cut Mikelić suffered during the bout.

After suffering the first loss of his professional career, Mikelić was booked to face Mirko Vorkapić at FFC12: Fabjan vs. Daley on 25 April 2014. He won the fight by a first-round technical knockout. Mikelić then took part in the 2014 Qabala Fight Series lightweight tournament, held during the organization's inaugural event on 29 June 2014. Although he was able to overcome Tadas Jonkus by unanimous decision in the quarterfinals of the one-day tournament, he would in turn lose a unanimous decision to Juri Kehl in the semifinals, after an extra fourth round was contested.

Mikelić faced Samo Petje for the vacant FFC lightweight championship at FFC14: Petje vs. Mikelić on 3 October 2014. He lost the fight by a first-round knockout, as Petje floored him with a head kick.

Mikelić snapped the first losing skid of his career with an extra round majority decision over Fabio Di Marco at FFC18: Ljubljana on 17 April 2015. Mikelić extended his winning streak to two straight fights at TTS Open Fight on 20 June 2015, as he knocked Antun Viličić out with a head kick in the second round.

Mikelić faced Tigran Movsisyan at FFC 19 - Linz on 18 September 2015. He was stopped with a flurry of punches at the 2:40 minute mark of the third round, after being knocked down with a left hook earlier in the round. Mikelić made his second and final Glory appearance against Anatoly Moiseev at Glory 25: Milan on 6 November 2015. He lost the fight by unanimous decision.

=== European circuit ===
Mikelić faced Vasile Lazăr for the vacant Kombat League European Lightweight (-70 kg) Championship at Trieste Boxing Day 4 on 21 May 2016. He captured the title by a third-round technical knockout. Mikelić next faced Ramazan Razakov in the first round of the 2017 Tatneft Cup selection tournament, held on 22 March 2017. He lost the fight by unanimous decision.

Mikelić faced Nikola Cimeša at W5 Undefeated 40 on 8 April 2017. He won the fight by unanimous decision. Mikelić took part in the 2017 The King Of Martial Arts lightweight (-70 kg) muay thai tournament, held on 20 May 2017 and contested in MMA gloves. He was able to beat Igor Kozak by decision in the semifinals, but lost a unanimous decision to Klayton Henriquez in the finals, after he was knocked down with a right hook.

Mikelić faced Damiano Ardigo at the 14 October 2017, Petrosyanmania event. Ardigo stepped in as a short notice replacement for Mustapha Haida, who was forced to withdraw with an injury. Mikelić needed just 57 seconds to stop his opponent with a head kick. Mikelić faced Thomas Leitner at FFC30: Linz on 21 October 2017. He won the fight by unanimous decision. Mikelić was then booked to face Marco Ronchetti at Iron Fighter on 17 November 2017. He won the fight by unanimous decision. It was the first time that he had won three consecutive fights since 2013.

Mikelić faced Sayfullah Hambahadov in the semifinals of the one-day CFL lightweight (-70 kg) tournament at CFL 2 on 12 April 2018. He lost the fight by unanimous decision. Mikelić faced Chris McMillan at FFC 33 on 3 November 2018. Although he was able to break McMillan's arm, he nonetheless lost the fight by split decision. Despite having suffered three straight losses, Mikelić was booked to challenge Čedo Pantić for the Megdan lightweight (-70 kg) championship at Megdan 4 on 16 March 2019. He lost the fight by unanimous decision.

Mikelić faced Raffaele Minichino at Gladijator Fight Night 4 on 22 February 2020. He won the fight by a first-round head kick knockout. Mikelić next faced Aurimas Krukauskas at KOK 96 Mega Battle on 20 November 2021. He won the fight by a second-round technical knockout.

Mikelić faced Mindaugas Narauskas in the quarterfinals of the King of Kings -73 kg tournament, held at KOK Mega Series 2022 on 19 March 2022. He lost the fight by a first-round knockout. Mikelić was booked to face Jasmin Ramić at King of Arena on 11 June 2022. He won the fight by a first-round technical knockout. Mikelić faced Leo Brichta at Noc Bojovníků Dobříš 5 on 22 September 2022. He lost the fight by unanimous decision. Mikelić rebounded from this loss with a third-round knockout of Jakub Kadas at RFA 6 on 12 November 2022.

Mikelić faced Pirun Wangpol-Komphikart at Blade Fights on 4 February 2023. He lost the fight by a first-round technical knockout.

Mikelić faced Dominik Bereczki at RFA 13 on 25 November 2023. He lost the fight by unanimous decision.

Mikelić faced Jahfaro Gezius at K-1 World GP 2024 in Sarajevo on 29 June 2024. He won the fight by split decision.

=== Return to Glory ===
Mikelić faced Antonio Krajinović at Glory 95 on 21 September 2024. He lost the fight by a first-round knockout.

== Championships and accomplishments ==
=== Amateur ===
- World Association of Kickboxing Organizations
  - 2012 WAKO European Championship 3rd Place, Full-Contact (-75 kg)
- Croatian Kickboxing Championship
  - 2013 Croatian Kickboxing Championship Runner-up, Full-Contact (-75 kg)
  - 2014 Croatian Kickboxing Championship Winner, K-1 (-75 kg)

=== Professional ===
- Kombat League
  - Kombat League European Lightweight Champion -70 kg

== Kickboxing record ==
Professional kickboxing record
23 wins (10 (T)KOs), 16 losses, 0 draws
Date	Result	Opponent	Event	Location	Method	Round	Time
2024-09-21	Loss	(Croatia) Antonio Krajinović	Glory 95	Zagreb, Croatia	TKO (corner stoppage)	1	0:57
2024-06-29	Win	(Suriname) Jahfaro Gezius	K-1 World GP 2024 in Sarajevo	Sarajevo, Bosnia and Herzegovina	Decision (split)	3	3:00
2023-11-25	Loss	(Hungary) Dominik Bereczki	RFA 13	Budapest, Hungary	Decision (unanimous)	5	3:00
For RFA Welterweight Championship -75 kg .
2023-02-04	Loss	(Thailand) Pirun Wangpol-Komphikart	Blade Fights	Kaunas, Lithuania	TKO (punches)	1	
2022-11-12	Win	(Slovakia) Jakub Kadáš	RFA 6	Prievidza, Slovakia	KO (head kick)	3	0:16
2022-09-24	Loss	(Czech Republic) Leo Brichta	Noc Bojovníků Dobříš 5	Dobříš, Czech Republic	Decision (unanimous)	3	3:00
2022-06-11	Win	(Bosnia and Herzegovina) Jasmin Ramić	King of Arena	Pula, Croatia	TKO (leg injury)	1	1:11
2022-04-15	Loss	(Estonia) Ott Remmer	The League III	Tallinn, Estonia	Decision (unanimous)	3	3:00
2022-03-19	Loss	(Lithuania) Mindaugas Narauskas	KOK Mega Series 2022	Vilnius, Lithuania	KO	1	
2022-02-26	Win	(Poland) Hubert Dylewski	KOK 98 World Series in Riga	Riga, Latvia	Decision (unanimous)	3	3:00
2021-12-20	Win	(Ukraine) Viachest Andreiev	FFC 5	Alanya, Turkey	Decision (unanimous)	3	3:00
2021-11-20	Win	(Lithuania) Aurimas Krukauskas	KOK 96 Mega Battle	Vilnius, Lithuania	KO (cut from knee)	2	
2021-02-28	Win	(Czech Republic) Andreas Čehovski	UNDC Last Man Standing	Brno, Czech Republic	Decision (unanimous)	3	3:00
2020-02-22	Win	(Italy) Raffaele Minichino	Gladijator Fight Night 4	Pula, Croatia	KO (high kick)	1	
2019-03-16	Loss	(Bosnia and Herzegovina) Čedo Pantić	Megdan 4	Novi Sad, Serbia	Decision (unanimous)	3	3:00
For Megdan Lightweight Championship -70 kg.
2018-11-03	Loss	(United States) Chris McMillan	FFC 33	Las Vegas, Nevada, USA	Decision (split)	3	3:00
2018-04-12	Loss	(Russia) Khambakhadov Saifullah	CFL 2, Semi Finals	Belgrade, Serbia	Decision (unanimous)	3	3:00
2017-11-17	Win	(Italy) Marco Ronchetti	Iron Fighter	Pordenone, Italia	Decision (unanimous)	5	3:00
2017-10-21	Win	(Austria) Thomas Leitner	FFC30: Linz	Linz, Austria	Decision (unanimous)	3	3:00
2017-10-14	Win	(Italy) Damiano Ardigo	Petrosyanmania	Monza, Italy	KO (head kick)	1	0:57
2017-05-20	Loss	(Netherlands) Klayton Henriquez	The King Of Martial Arts, Semi Finals	Trieste, Italy	Decision (unanimous)	3	3:00
2017-05-20	Win	(Ukraine) Igor Kozak	The King Of Martial Arts, Quarter Finals	Trieste, Italy	Decision	3	3:00
2017-04-08	Win	(Serbia) Nikola Cimeša	W5 Undefeated 40	Dubrovnik, Croatia	Decision (unanimous)	3	3:00
2017-03-22	Loss	(Russia) Ramazan Razakov	Tatneft Cup 2017 - 1st selection 1/8 final	Kazan, Russia	Decision (unanimous)	3	3:00
2016-05-21	Win	(Moldova) Vasile Lazăr	Trieste Boxing Day 4	Trieste, Italy	KO (left uppercut)	3	2:27
Wins the vacant Kombat League European Lightweight Championship -70 kg.
2015-11-06	Loss	(Russia) Anatoly Moiseev	Glory 25: Milan	Monza, Italy	Decision (unanimous)	3	3:00
2015-09-18	Loss	(Czech Republic) Tigran Movsisyan	FFC 19 - Linz	Linz, Austria	TKO (punches)	3	2:40
2015-06-20	Win	(Croatia) Antun Viličić	TTS Open Fight	Varaždin, Croatia	KO (high kick)	2	
2015-04-17	Win	(Italy) Fabio Di Marco	FFC18: Ljubljana	Ljubljana, Slovenia	Ext. R. decision (majority)	4	3:00
2014-10-03	Loss	(Slovenia) Samo Petje	FFC14: Petje vs. Mikelić	Ljubljana, Slovenia	KO (right high kick)	1	1:05
For the vacant FFC Lightweight Championship -70 kg.
2014-06-29	Loss	(Germany) Juri Kehl	Qabala Fight Series #1, Semi Finals	Qabala, Azerbaijan	Ext. R. decision (unanimous)	3	3:00
2014-06-29	Win	(Lithuania) Tadas Jonkus	Qabala Fight Series #1, Quarter Finals	Qabala, Azerbaijan	Decision (unanimous)	3	3:00
2014-04-25	Win	(Slovenia) Mirko Vorkapić	FFC12: Fabjan vs. Daley	Ljubljana, Slovenia	TKO (cut)	1	1:23
2014-03-08	Win	(Suriname) Murthel Groenhart	Glory 14: Zagreb	Zagreb, Croatia	TKO (cut)	1	3:00
2013-12-13	Win	(North Macedonia) Slobodan Kajmakoski	FFC10: Rodriguez vs. Batzelas	Skopje, Macedonia	Decision (unanimous)	3	3:00
2013-06-14	Win	(Slovenia) Samo Petje	FFC06: Jurković vs. Poturak	Poreč, Croatia	Decision (unanimous)	3	2:00
2012-07-21	Win	(Senegal) Mamadou Sly	Mega Fight	Umag, Croatia	Decision (unanimous)	3	2:00
2011-02-20	Win	(Croatia) Rene Pavić	Opatija Fight Night 3	Opatija, Croatia	KO (kick)	1	

Amateur kickboxing record
Date	Result	Opponent	Event	Location	Method	Round	Time
2014-04-12	Win	(Croatia) Manuel Smoljan	Croatian Kickboxing Championship, K-1 Final -75 kg	Poreč, Croatia	Decision (split)	3	2:00
Wins Croatian Kickboxing Championship K-1 Gold Medal -75 kg.
2014-04-12	Win	(Croatia) Luka Habek	Croatian Kickboxing Championship, K-1 Semi Finals -75 kg	Poreč, Croatia	Decision (unanimous)	3	2:00
2014-04-12	Win	(Croatia) Marko Gelo	Croatian Kickboxing Championship, K-1 Quarter Finals -75 kg	Poreč, Croatia	Decision (unanimous)	3	2:00
2013-03-23	Loss	(Croatia) Manuel Smoljan	Croatian Kickboxing Championship, Full-Contact Final -75 kg	Split, Croatia	Decision (unanimous)	3	2:00
Wins Croatian Kickboxing Championship Full-Contact Silver Medal -75 kg.
2013-03-23	Win	(Croatia) Dario Gvozdanović	Croatian Kickboxing Championship, Full-Contact Final -75 kg	Split, Croatia	Decision (split)	3	2:00
2012-11	Loss	(Norway) Andreas Lødrup	W.A.K.O European Championships 2012, Full-Contact Semi Finals -75 kg	Bucharest, Romania	Decision (unanimous)	3	2:00
Wins W.A.K.O. European Championship '12 Full-Contact Bronze Medal -75 kg.
2012-11-29	Win	(Hungary) Laszlo Szabo	W.A.K.O European Championships 2012, Full-Contact Quarter Finals -75 kg	Bucharest, Romania	Decision (unanimous)	3	2:00
2012-11-27	Win	(Romania) Ionel Alexandru	W.A.K.O European Championships 2012, Full-Contact Second Round -75 kg	Bucharest, Romania			
2012-11-27	Win	(Greece) Antonios Gavalas	W.A.K.O European Championships 2012, Full-Contact First Round -75 kg	Bucharest, Romania	Decision (unanimous)	3	2:00
2010-09	Loss	(Russia) Vladimir Shiryaev	W.A.K.O Junior European Championships 2010, Low-Kick Quarter Finals -75 kg	Belgrade, Serbia			
2010-09	Win	(North Macedonia) Dimitar Gjorgjiev	W.A.K.O Junior European Championships 2010, Low-Kick First Round -75 kg	Belgrade, Serbia			
Legend: Win Loss Draw/no contest Notes

== See also ==
- List of WAKO Amateur World Championships
- List of WAKO Amateur European Championships
- List of male kickboxers
