= K-1 World MAX =

K-1 WORLD MAX, is an elimination kickboxing -70 kg tournament that was originally held annually from 2002 by the K-1 organization, under the ownership of the Fighting and Entertainment Group (FEG). Each year, K-1 would hold various 16-men, 8-match WORLD MAX style qualifying tournaments throughout the world to determine which 16 fighters will compete in the main World MAX Final.

== Champions ==
Year	Winner	Runner-up	3rd place
2002	(Netherlands) Albert Kraus	(Thailand) Kaolan Kaovichit	(Japan) Masato (Japan) Takayuki Kohiruimaki
2003	(Japan) Masato	(Netherlands) Albert Kraus	(United States) Duane Ludwig (Thailand) Sakeddaw Kiatputon
2004	(Thailand) Buakaw Por. Pramuk	(Japan) Masato	(Netherlands) Albert Kraus (Japan) Takayuki Kohiruimaki
2005	(Netherlands) Andy Souwer	(Thailand) Buakaw Por. Pramuk	(Netherlands) Albert Kraus (Japan) Kazuya Yasuhiro
2006	(Thailand) Buakaw Por. Pramuk	(Netherlands) Andy Souwer	(Japan) Masato (Armenia) Gago Drago
2007	(Netherlands) Andy Souwer	(Japan) Masato	(Netherlands) Albert Kraus (Ukraine) Artur Kyshenko
2008	(Japan) Masato	(Ukraine) Artur Kyshenko	(Netherlands) Andy Souwer (Japan) Yoshihiro Sato
2009	(Italy) Giorgio Petrosyan	(Netherlands) Andy Souwer	(Thailand) Buakaw Por. Pramuk (Japan) Yuya Yamamoto
2010	(Italy) Giorgio Petrosyan	(Japan) Yoshihiro Sato	(Greece) Mike Zambidis (Armenia) Gago Drago
2024	(Bulgaria) Stoyan Koprivlenski	(Russia) Viktor Akimov	(Brazil) Dengue Silva (Spain) Sergio Sanchez
2025	(Brazil) Jonas Salsicha	(Netherlands) Darryl Verdonk	(Bulgaria) Stoyan Koprivlenski (Samoa) Jonathan Aiulu
2026			

== See also ==
- List of K-1 events
- List of male kickboxers
