= Amansio Paraschiv =

Romanian boxer and kickboxer

- Born: Amansio Andrei Paraschiv; June 25, 1992 (age 34); Ploiești, Romania
- Other names: The Viking; The Sheik (former)
- Height: 1.75 m (5 ft 9 in)
- Weight: 69.5 kg (153 lb; 10.94 st)
- Division: Middleweight; Super-welterweight
- Style: Kickboxing, Boxing
- Fighting out of: South Ockendon, Essex
- Team: Essex Kickboxing Academy; Superpro Sibiu (part-time)
- Trainer: Steve Kerridge (head coach); Lukas Kavaliauskas (assistant); Alin Bălașa (part-time)

Professional boxing record
- Total: 9
- Wins: 9
- By knockout: 3
- Losses: 0
- Draws: 0

Kickboxing record
- Total: 60
- Wins: 46
- By knockout: 20
- Losses: 13
- By knockout: 2
- Draws: 1

Other information
- Spouse: Alexa Paraschiv
- Boxing record from BoxRec
- Last updated on: June 14, 2025

Amansio Andrei Paraschiv (born June 25, 1992) is a Romanian professional kickboxer and boxer. He won back to back gold medals in the WAKO European Championships, and is the current SUPERKOMBAT Middleweight Champion. Paraschiv became champion on 12 November 2016 after defeating former It's Showtime 69MAX champion and reigning title holder Chris Ngimbi.

== Personal life ==
He is the son of former professional boxer, Gheorghe Paraschiv, a two-time Romanian champion in two weight divisions (featherweight and super featherweight). Paraschiv is married and has 2 daughters (born 2015).

== Career ==
He won the SUPERKOMBAT New Heroes Middleweight Championship in March 2015, with a unanimous decision win over Julian Imeri. Paraschiv had fought Cedric Manhoef for the same title a year before, but their fight ended in a draw.

Amansio fought Chris Ngimbi for the SUPERKOMBAT Middleweight title in November 2016. He had fought him just a month before for the vacant title, but lost by decision. He was more successful in the rematch, and defeated Ngimbi by unanimous decision.

Paraschiv was stopped for the only time ins his career in controversial circumstances to lose a lightweight bout against the defending champion Armen Petrosyan. Bellator booked a rematch after the stoppage at Bellator Kickboxing 8.

He defended his SUPERKOMBAT Middleweight title against Rosario Presti, during OSS Fighters 04. He successfully defended the title with a unanimous decision win.

On 15 October 2020, he signed with boxing's MTK Global.

Paraschiv will make his promotional debut on short notice on July 17, 2023 against K-1's former super lightweight and welterweight champion Masaaki Noiri at K-1 World GP 2023.

== Championships and accomplishments ==
=== Kickboxing ===
- World Association of Kickboxing Organizations
  - 2022 WAKO-Pro Intercontinental Light Middleweight (-71.8 kg) Championship
  - 2012 WAKO European Championships in Bucharest, Romania Full-Contact Rules (gold) −67.0 kg
  - 2012 WAKO European Championships in Ankara, Turkey K-1 Rules (gold) −67.0 kg
- Fight Clubbing Championship
  - 2022 Fight Clubbing World Middleweight Championship
- Golden Fighter Championship
  - 2021 GFC Intercontinental Light Middleweight (-71.0 kg) Championship
- World All Fight System Organization
  - 2017 AFSO Intercontinental Middleweight (-71.0 kg) Kickboxing Rules Championship
- Superkombat Fighting Championship
  - 2016 SUPERKOMBAT Middleweight (-72.5 kg) Championship
  - 2015 SUPERKOMBAT New Heroes Middleweight (-71.0 kg) Championship
  - 2014 Rising Star
- Kunlun Fight
  - 2015 Kunlun Fight 16 Middleweight (-70.0 kg) Tournament Championship
- World Kickboxing Network
  - 2013 WKN Intercontinental Super Welterweight (-72.6 kg) Oriental Rules Championship
- Local Kombat
  - 2012 Local Kombat National -69.0 kg Championship
- Kickboxing Romania Awards
  - 2024 Boxing Award
  - 2023 Comeback of the Year

=== Boxing ===
- Romanian Boxing Federation
  - 2013 Romania National Boxing Championships (bronze) −69.0 kg

== Professional kickboxing record ==
Kickboxing record
46 Wins (20 (T) KO's), 13 Losses, 1 Draw
Date	Result	Opponent	Event	Location	Method	Round	Time
2025-06-14	Win	(Scotland) Shane Burns	MTGP 94	London, England	TKO (referee stoppage)	3	0:44
2024-05-04	Win	(Germany) Chris Wunn	Fight Clubbing 35	Pescara, Italy	TKO (towel thrown)	1	1:46
2023-12-16	Win	(Spain) Máximo Suárez	Fight Clubbing 33	Chieti, Italy	Decision (split)	5	3:00
Fight Clubbing World Middleweight Championship Unification Bout.
2023-10-21	Win	(Italy) Abdourahmane Diallo	MO Fighting Show 1	Turin, Italy	Decision (unanimous)	3	3:00
2023-07-17	Loss	(Japan) Masaaki Noiri	K-1 World GP 2023	Tokyo, Japan	KO (body kick)	1	1:33
2022-12-17	Win	(Morocco) Ayoub Boukili	Fight Clubbing 30	Chieti, Italy	Decision (unanimous)	5	3:00
Won the WAKO-Pro Intercontinental Light Middleweight Championship & the Fight Clubbing World Middleweight Championship.
2022-09-10	Win	(Spain) Sergio Sánchez	Best of the Best 1	Brăila, Romania	Decision (split)	5	3:00
Defended the SUPERKOMBAT World Middleweight Championship.
2022-05-14	Win	(Italy) Giuseppe Palermo	Fight Clubbing 29	Pescara, Italy	TKO (doctor stoppage)	3	1:32
2021-11-12	Loss	(Morocco) Nordin Ben Moh	Enfusion 104	Abu Dhabi, UAE	Decision (split)	3	3:00
Enfusion Lightweight Championship Eliminator
2021-08-17	Win	(Netherlands) Lofogo Sarour	KO Masters 9	Bucharest, Romania	Decision (unanimous)	3	3:00
2021-07-16	Win	(Netherlands) Zahid Zairov	OSS Fighters 06	Constanța, Romania	Decision (unanimous)	3	3:00
2021-06-24	Win	(Netherlands) Christian Baya	GFC 7: Romania vs. Netherlands	Bucharest, Romania	Decision (split)	3	3:00
Won the GFC Intercontinental Light Middleweight Championship.
2020-02-22	Loss	(France) Jonathan Mayezo	Stars Night 2020	Vitrolles, France	Decision (split)	3	3:00
2020-02-07	Win	(Denmark) Mohamed El-Mir	OSS Fighters 05	Bucharest, Romania	Decision (unanimous)	3	3:00
2019-12-07	Loss	(Germany) Akam Tarageh	Mix Fight Championship	Frankfurt, Germany	Decision (unanimous)	3	3:00
2019-08-22	Win	(Italy) Rosario Presti	OSS Fighters 04	Mamaia, Romania	Decision (unanimous)	3	3:00
Defended the SUPERKOMBAT Middleweight Championship.
2019-06-13	Loss	(Spain) Edye Ruiz	SAS Gym 02	Bucharest, Romania	Decision (split)	3	3:00
2019-02-28	Win	(Romania) Cristian Milea	OSS Fighters 03	Bucharest, Romania	Decision (unanimous)	3	3:00
2018-12-14	Win	(Italy) Isteri Mitat	Dynamite Fighting Show 3	Craiova, Romania	Decision (unanimous)	3	3:00
2018-10-27	Loss	(Netherlands) Tayfun Özcan	Enfusion 73	Oberhausen, Germany	Decision (unanimous)	3	3:00
2018-10-08	Win	(France) Ayoub Abdelkader	APP Fight Night 01	Brașov, Romania	KO (liver knee)	1	2:54
2018-07-05	Win	(Germany) Waldemar Nuriddinov	Dynamite Fighting Show 1	Bucharest, Romania	TKO (doctor stoppage/spinning backfist)	3	1:58
2018-05-24	Win	(Georgia (country)) Otar Gogoberichvili	Colosseum Tournament 7	Bucharest, Romania	Decision (unanimous)	3	3:00
2018-04-20	Win	(Spain) Simon Mendès	Colosseum Tournament 6	Iași, Romania	Decision (unanimous)	3	3:00
2018-02-23	Win	(Italy) Yuri Gentile	Colosseum Tournament 5	Galați, Romania	Decision (unanimous)	3	3:00
2017-12-09	Loss	(Italy) Armen Petrosyan	Bellator Kickboxing 8 at Bellator 190	Florence, Italy	TKO (middle kick)	1	2:12
For the ISKA World Super Welterweight Championship. Oriental Rules.
2017-10-16	Win	(Italy) Ivan Naccari	Colosseum Tournament 4	Bucharest, Romania	TKO (doctor stoppage)	2	2:11
2017-07-14	Win	(Germany) Tim Müller	Colosseum Tournament 3: Romania vs. Germany	Mamaia, Romania	KO (right hook)	3	2:58
Won the AFSO Intercontinental Middleweight Championship.
2017-06-17	Win	(Italy) Jordan Valdinocci	Colosseum Tournament 2	Ploiești, Romania	Decision (unanimous)	3	3:00
2017-04-08	Loss	(Italy) Giorgio Petrosyan	Bellator Kickboxing 5 at Bellator 176	Turin, Italy	Decision (unanimous)	3	3:00
2016-11-12	Win	(Netherlands) Chris Ngimbi	SUPERKOMBAT World Grand Prix 2016 Final	Bucharest, Romania	Decision (unanimous)	3	3:00
Won the SUPERKOMBAT Middleweight Championship.
2016-10-01	Loss	(Netherlands) Chris Ngimbi	SUPERKOMBAT World Grand Prix 2016 Final Elimination	Iași, Romania	Decision (unanimous)	3	3:00
For the vacant SUPERKOMBAT Middleweight Championship.
2016-07-30	Win	(Bulgaria) Rangel Ivanov	SUPERKOMBAT World Grand Prix III 2016	Mamaia, Romania	TKO (doctor stoppage)	1	2:50
2016-12-12	Win	(Morocco) Alkid Farruku	SUPERKOMBAT Special Edition Italy	Turin, Italy	KO (liver shot)	1	2:02
2016-06-25	Win	(Morocco) Anouar Lahmaj	SUPERKOMBAT New Heroes 9	Brașov, Romania	Decision (majority)	3	3:00
2016-05-07	Win	(Romania) Cristian Milea	SUPERKOMBAT World Grand Prix II 2016	Bucharest, Romania	Decision (split)	3	3:00
2015-10-31	Loss	(China) Zhang Chunyu	Kunlun Fight 33	Changde, China	Decision (unanimous)	3	3:00
Kunlun Fight World MAX 2015 Final, Quarter Finals.
2015-10-02	Win	(Greece) Giannis Skordilis	SUPERKOMBAT World Grand Prix 2015 Final Elimination	Milan, Italy	Decision (unanimous)	3	3:00
2015-05-23	Win	(France) Hirachidine Saindou	SUPERKOMBAT World Grand Prix II 2015	Bucharest, Romania	TKO (referee stoppage)	1	1:59
2015-04-18	Loss	(Spain) Elam Ngor	Enfusion #27	Tenerife, Spain	Decision (unanimous)	3	3:00
2015-03-07	Win	(Italy) Julian Imeri	SUPERKOMBAT World Grand Prix I 2015	Ploiești, Romania	Decision (unanimous)	3	3:00
Won the SUPERKOMBAT New Heroes Middleweight Championship.
2015-02-01	Win	(China) Liu Hainan	Kunlun Fight 19	Guangzhou, China	Decision	3	3:00
2015-01-04	Win	(China) Kong Lingfeng	Kunlun Fight 16, Final	Nanjing, China	KO (jumping knee)	2	2:59
Qualified for Kunlun Fight World MAX 2015 Final.
2015-01-04	Win	(Spain) David Calvo	Kunlun Fight 16, Semi Finals	Nanjing, China	KO (right hook)	2	1:31
2014-11-22	Win	(Italy) Riccardo Lecca	SUPERKOMBAT World Grand Prix 2014 Final	Monza, Italy	KO (left hook)	1	1:50
2014-10-04	Loss	(France) Maxime Cerri	GBC: World Tour 7, Semi Finals	Mazan, France	Decision (majority)	3	3:00
2014-08-02	Win	(Romania) Mădălin Crăciunică	SUPERKOMBAT New Heroes 8	Constanța, Romania	Decision (unanimous)	3	3:00
2014-06-27	Win	(France) Julien Souvenir	Battle of Saint-Raphaël II	Saint-Raphaël, France	Decision	3	3:00
Defended the WKN Intercontinental Super Welterweight Championship. Oriental Rules.
2014-05-24	Win	(Bulgaria) Rangel Ivanov	SUPERKOMBAT World Grand Prix II 2014	Mamaia, Romania	Decision (unanimous)	3	3:00
2014-03-29	Draw	(Netherlands) Cedric Manhoef	SUPERKOMBAT New Heroes 7	Ploiești, Romania	Draw (majority)	3	3:00
For the SUPERKOMBAT New Heroes Middleweight Championship.
2013-11-24	Win	(Belgium) Lefterio Perego	La Nuit Des Titans XI	Charleroi, Belgium	Decision (unanimous)	5	3:00
Won the WKN Intercontinental Super Welterweight Championship. Oriental Rules.
2013-11-09	Win	(Morocco) Mohamed Ben Ali	SUPERKOMBAT World Grand Prix 2013 Final Elimination	Ploiești, Romania	TKO (retirement)	1	3:00
SUPERKOMBAT New Heroes Middleweight Title Eliminator.
2013-10-12	Win	(Romania) Alexandru Popescu	Golden League XVII	Bucharest, Romania	TKO (retirement)	1	0:47
2013-05-11	Win	(Netherlands) Angelo Wilkes	Enfusion Live: A1 World Combat Cup	Eindhoven, Netherlands	Decision (majority)	3	3:00
2012-12-07	Win	(Romania) Alin Șpan	Local Kombat Onești	Onești, Romania	TKO (doctor stoppage/cut)	2	2:35
Won the vacant Local Kombat National -69 kg Championship.
2012-09-22	Win	(Romania) Marius Ciocîrlă	Călimăneşti Challenge	Călimănești, Romania	TKO	2	1:21
2012-05-04	Loss	(Romania) Alin Șpan	Local Kombat Bodyguardul: Deva	Deva, Romania	Decision (split)	3	3:00
2012-02-25	Win	(Romania) Flavius Predoi	RXF 2	Râmnicu Vâlcea, Romania	Decision	3	3:00
Legend: Win Loss Draw/No contest Notes

== Amateur kickboxing record ==
Amansio Paraschiv
Date	Result	Opponent	Event	Location	Method	Round
2012–12	Win	(Russia) Oleg Zaytcev	2012 WAKO European Full-Contact Championships, Final	Bucharest, Romania	Decision (unanimous)	3
Won the Gold Medal -67.0 kg.
2012–12	Win	(Russia) Vyacheslav Borshchev	2012 WAKO European K-1 Championships, Final	Ankara, Turkey	—N/a	—N/a
Won the Gold Medal -67.0 kg.
2012–11	Win	(Poland) Piotr Kobylański	2012 WAKO European K-1 Championships, Semi Finals	Ankara, Turkey	Decision (unanimous)	3
2012–11	Win	(Bulgaria) Pavel Filimonov	2012 WAKO European K-1 Championships, Quarter Finals	Ankara, Turkey	Decision (unanimous)	3
Legend: Win Loss Draw/No contest Notes

== Professional boxing record ==
9 fights	9 wins	0 losses
By knockout	4	0
By decision	5	0
Draws	0	

No.	Result	Record	Opponent	Type	Round, time	Date	Location	Notes
9	Win	9–0	Joshua Munisi	KO	1	19 Oct 2024	Crystal Palace National Sports Centre, London, England	
8	Win	8–0	Evandro Cavalheiro	KO	2	24 May 2024	Olimpia Arena, Ploiești, Romania	
7	Win	7–0	Krisztián Sánta	KO	1	17 May 2024	Multipurpose Arena, Craiova, Romania	
6	Win	6–0	Charlie Sheldon	UD	4	10 February 2024	Brentwood Centre, Brentwood, England	
5	Win	5–0	Ioan-Alexandru Lutic	UD	6	23 May 2023	Mioveni Arena, Mioveni, Romania	
4	Win	4–0	Octavian Gratii	UD	6	7 May 2022	Olimpia Arena, Timișoara, Romania	
3	Win	3–0	Ionuț Trandafir	KO	3	30 July 2021	Olimpia Arena, Timișoara, Romania	
2	Win	2–0	Teodor Boyadzhiev	UD	4	28 Jun 2019	Olimpia Arena, Timișoara, Romania	
1	Win	1–0	Nando Calzetta	UD	4	28 Aug 2015	Dunărea Ice Rink, Galați, Romania	

== See also ==
- List of male kickboxers
