= Łukasz Krupadziorow =

Polish heavyweight kickboxer (born 1989)

- Born: Lukasz Krupadziorow; 1989 (age 36–37); Augustow, Poland
- Other names: Big Polski
- Nationality: Polish
- Height: 1.95 m (6 ft 5 in)
- Weight: 115 kg (254 lb; 18 st 2 lb)
- Division: Heavyweight
- Style: Kickboxing
- Fighting out of: Luton, England, United Kingdom
- Team: Storm Gym
- Trainer: Amir Subašić

Kickboxing record
- Total: 16
- Wins: 11
- By knockout: 8
- Losses: 5
- By knockout: 4
- Last updated on: May 6, 2017

Łukasz Krupadziorow (born 1989) is a Polish heavyweight kickboxer.

== Background ==
Łukasz comes from Augustow, Poland, started training kickboxing in 2012 in Storm Gym Luton. He came to England for work, as he was always interested in martial arts he started training kickboxing regularly.

== Kickboxing record ==
Professional kickboxing record
11 Wins, 5 Losses, 0 Draw
Date	Result	Opponent	Event	Location	Method	Round	Time
2019-07-13	Loss	(Lithuania) Arnold Oborotov	Kickboxing Grand Prix 22	London, England	TKO (referee stoppage)	5	3:00
2017-05-06	Loss	(Romania) Cătălin Moroșanu	SUPERKOMBAT World Grand Prix II 2017	Madrid, Spain	Decision (unanimous)	3	3:00
2017-04-07	Win	(United States) Tony Johnson	SUPERKOMBAT World Grand Prix I 2017	Bucharest, Romania	TKO (Cut)	1	
2015-05-16	Loss	(Poland) Łukasz Parobiec	Super Fight Series: Episode I Cosmic Collision	London, England	KO	1	0:21
For the ISKA World Super-heavyweight (+100 kg/+220 lb) K-1 Rules Championship.
2014-09-23	Loss	(Suriname) Ashwin Balrak	Enfusion 5: Victory of the Vixen, Final	Koh Samui, Thailand	TKO (Low Kicks)		
For the Enfusion Reality Season 5 Tournament Championship.
2014-09-23	Win	(England) Daniel Sam	Enfusion 5: Victory of the Vixen, Semi Finals	Koh Samui, Thailand	Decision	3	3:00
2014-03-01	Loss	(United Kingdom) Dawid Żółtaszek	KTMMA 2	Manchester, England	KO (Punch)	1	2:36
2013-11	Win	(Lithuania) Tomas Vaikus	KTMMA 1 (2x5)	Manchester, England	TKO (Referee Stoppage)	1	1:26
2013-05-19	Loss	(England) Correy Robins		Dudley, England	Decision		
For the WKA British K1 rules title.
2013-04-14	Win	(England) Ricky Nickolson	Russ Williams Promotions Fight Night	Wrexham, Wales	RD	2	3:00
2013-02	Win	(United Kingdom) Alex Jakubiek		Manchester, England	Decision	3	2:00
Wins European Kickboxing Championship.
Legend: Win Loss Draw/No contest Notes

== See also ==
- List of male kickboxers
