= Tarik Khbabez =

Moroccan kickboxer (born 1992)

- Born: 20 April 1992 (age 34); Salé, Morocco
- Nickname: The Tank
- Height: 184 cm (6 ft 0 in)
- Weight: 95 kg (209 lb; 15 st)
- Division: Heavyweight (2005–2018, 2020–2022); Light heavyweight (2018–2019, 2022-Present)
- Reach: 74 in (190 cm)
- Style: Kickboxing
- Stance: Orthodox
- Fighting out of: The Hague, Netherlands
- Team: ARJ Trainingen
- Trainer: Maikel Polanen
- Years active: 2005 - present

Kickboxing record
- Total: 66
- Wins: 53
- By knockout: 28
- Losses: 11
- By knockout: 7
- Draws: 1
- No contests: 1

Tarik Khbabez (born 20 April 1992) is a Moroccan kickboxer currently signed to Glory, where he is a former Glory Light Heavyweight Champion. He won the Superkombat World Grand Prix Heavyweight Tournament in 2015 and competed in ONE Championship where he was a former ONE Light Heavyweight Kickboxing world title challenger.

He was ranked as the #4 light heavyweight by Combat Press as of November 2026,

== Career ==
=== SUPERKOMBAT ===
Khbabez took part in the 2014 SUPERKOMBAT Qualification tournament. In the semifinals he beat Gurhan Degirmenci through a first-round TKO. He defeated Dexter Suisse in the finals by unanimous decision.

He participated in the 2015 SUPERKOMBAT World Grand Prix. In the semifinals he defeated Nicolas Wamba by decision. Tarik won the final bout against Roman Kryklia by decision as well.

=== ONE Championship ===
Tarik Khbabez made his ONE Championship debut on 23 June 2018, at ONE Championship: Pinnacle of Power, where he defeated Alain Ngalani by TKO at 1:43 of the third round.

On 27 August 2018, Khbabez signed a multi-fight contract with ONE Championship, where he would compete in the organization's all-striking ONE Super Series.

On 26 October 2018, he faced Ibrahim El Bouni at ONE Championship: Pursuit of Greatness. Khbabez won the fight by TKO via referee stoppage. On 9 March 2019, he picked up a unanimous decision victory over Andrei Stoica at ONE Championship: Reign of Valor. On 15 June 2019, he defeated Anderson Silva by unanimous decision at ONE Championship: Legendary Quest. At this point, Khbabez was 4–0 in ONE Super Series.

On 16 November 2019, Tarik Khbabez faced Roman Kryklia for the inaugural ONE Light Heavyweight Kickboxing World Championship. Going into the fight as a favorite, Khbabez lost by TKO in the second round.

=== GLORY ===
On 30 October 2020, it was announced that Tarik Khbabez signed with Glory. Khbabez will make his promotional debut at Glory 77, against Antonio Plazibat. Khbabez was later rescheduled to face Levi Rigters in a four-man heavyweight tournament. He beat Rigters by split decision, but lost the final bout against Rico Verhoeven by TKO. Three months prior to the tournament, Khbabez underwent hand surgery. He later revealed he had re-injured his hand during the final bout with Verhoeven.

Khbabez was scheduled to fight the #6 ranked Glory heavyweight Antonio Plazibat at Glory 78: Rotterdam. The pair was originally scheduled to fight at GLORY 77, before Plazibat withdrew due to injuries sustained in training.

Khbabaez was booked to face the Glory Light Heavyweight champion Artem Vakhitov in a catchweight non-title bout at Glory 80 on 19 March 2022. Vakhitov withdrew from the bout on 12 March.

Khbabez fought a rematch with Antonio Plazibat at Glory 80 Studio on 14 May 2022. He lost the fight by a third-round knockout.

==== Move to light-heavyweight ====
Khbabez faced Sergej Maslobojev for the vacant Glory Light Heavyweight Championship at Glory: Collision 4 on 8 October 2022. He lost the fight by split decision.

Khbabez was expected to face Kristpas Zile at Glory 84 on 11 March 2023. Zile later withdrew from the bout and was replaced by Daniel Toledo. Khbabez won the fight by a second-round technical knockout.

Khbabez was expected to challenge Donegi Abena for the Glory Light Heavyweight Championship at Glory: Collision 5 on 17 June 2023. Abena withdrew from the fight with food poisoning on 14 June and was replaced by Mohamed Amine, who faced Khbabez for the interim Glory Light Heavyweight Championship. Khbabez won the fight by a fourth-round knockout.

Khbabez was expected to challenge Donegi Abena for the Glory Light Heavyweight Championship at Glory: Collision 6 on 4 November 2023. Khbabez withdrew from the fight with a hand injury on 31 October, and was replaced by Mohamed Touchassie.

Khbabez challenged the Glory Light Heavyweight champion Donegi Abena at Glory Heavyweight Grand Prix on 9 March 2024. He won the fight by split decision.

Khbabez faced Pascal Touré in the quarterfinals of the Glory Light Heavyweight Grand Prix, held on 8 June 2024, in Rotterdam, Netherlands. He won the fight by unanimous decision. Khbabez suffered a second-round stoppage loss to the eventual tournament winner Donegi Abena in the tournament semifinals.

Khbabez made his first Glory Light Heavyweight Championship defense against Donegi Abena at Glory Collision 7 on 7 December 2024. He won the fight by split decision.

Khbabez made his second Glory Light Heavyweight Championship defense against Sergej Maslobojev at Glory 100 on 14 June 2025. He lost the fight by a fourth-round technical knockout.

Khbabez faced Bahram Rajabzadeh for the vacant Glory Light Heavyweight Championship at Glory 104 on 11 October 2025. He won the fight by majority decision.

== Personal life ==
Khbabez was born in Salé, Morocco. At a young age his family moved to the Netherlands, where he grew up in The Hague.

== Titles and accomplishments ==
- Glory
  - 2024 Glory Light Heavyweight Champion (Two times, current)
    - One successful title defense
  - 2025 Fight of the Year (vs. Bahram Rajabzadeh at Glory 104)
  - 2024 Fight of the Year (vs. Donegi Abena at Glory Collision 7)
  - 2023 interim Glory Light Heavyweight Champion (One time, former)
  - 2022 Fight of the Year (vs. Sergej Maslobojev at Glory Collision 4)
  - 2021 Glory 77 Heavyweight Tournament Runner-Up
- SUPERKOMBAT Fighting Championship
  - 2015 SUPERKOMBAT World Grand Prix Winner
  - 2014 SUPERKOMBAT World Grand Prix IV Tournament Champion

Awards

- 2025 Beyond Kickboxing Fight of the Year (vs. Bahram Rajabzadeh)

== Kickboxing record ==
Professional Kickboxing Record
53 Wins (29 (T)KOs), 11 Losses, 1 Draw, 1 No Contest
Date	Result	Opponent	Event	Location	Method	Round	Time
2026-12-12		(Morocco) Mohamed Touchassie	Glory Collision 10	Arnhem, Netherlands			
For the Glory Light Heavyweight Championship.
2025-10-11	Win	(Azerbaijan) Bahram Rajabzadeh	Glory 104	Rotterdam, Netherlands	Decision (Majority)	5	3:00
Wins the vacant Glory Light Heavyweight Championship.
2025-06-14	NC	(Lithuania) Sergej Maslobojev	Glory 100	Rotterdam, Netherlands	TKO (3 Knockdowns)	4	2:06
Defended the Glory Light Heavyweight Championship. Originally a TKO win for Maslobojev; overturned after he tested positive for a metabolite of stanozolol.
2024-12-07	Win	(Suriname) Donegi Abena	Glory Collision 7	Arnhem, Netherlands	Decision (Split)	5	3:00
Defends the Glory Light Heavyweight Championship.
2024-06-08	Loss	(Suriname) Donegi Abena	Glory Light Heavyweight Grand Prix, Semifinals	Rotterdam, Netherlands	KO (Low kick)	2	0:30
2024-06-08	Win	(France) Pascal Touré	Glory Light Heavyweight Grand Prix, Quarterfinals	Rotterdam, Netherlands	Decision (Unanimous)	3	3:00
2024-03-09	Win	(Suriname) Donegi Abena	Glory Heavyweight Grand Prix	Arnhem, Netherlands	Decision (Split)	5	3:00
Wins the Glory Light Heavyweight Championship.
2023-06-17	Win	(Morocco) Mohamed Amine	Glory: Collision 5	Rotterdam, Netherlands	KO (Uppercut)	4	2:02
Won the Interim Glory Light Heavyweight Championship
2023-03-11	Win	(Spain) Daniel Toledo	Glory 84	Rotterdam, Netherlands	TKO (Corner stoppage)	2	2:47
2022-10-08	Loss	(Lithuania) Sergej Maslobojev	Glory: Collision 4	Arnhem, Netherlands	Decision (Split)	5	3:00
For the vacant Glory Light Heavyweight Championship
2022-05-14	Loss	(Croatia) Antonio Plazibat	Glory 80 Studio	Netherlands	KO (Punches)	3	0:52
2021-09-04	Loss	(Croatia) Antonio Plazibat	Glory 78: Rotterdam	Rotterdam, Netherlands	KO (Punches)	2	2:14
2021-01-30	Loss	(Netherlands) Rico Verhoeven	Glory 77: Rotterdam, Final	Rotterdam, Netherlands	TKO (Corner Stoppage/Injury)	1	3:00
For the Glory 77 Heavyweight Tournament.
2021-01-30	Win	(Netherlands) Levi Rigters	Glory 77: Rotterdam, Semi Final	Rotterdam, Netherlands	Decision (Majority)	3	3:00
2019-11-16	Loss	(Ukraine) Roman Kryklia	ONE Championship: Age Of Dragons	Beijing, China	TKO (3 Knockdown Rule)	2	0:43
For the ONE Kickboxing Light Heavyweight Championship.
2019-06-15	Win	(Brazil) Anderson Silva	ONE Championship: Legendary Quest	Shanghai, China	Decision (Unanimous)	3	3:00
2019-03-09	Win	(Romania) Andrei Stoica	ONE Championship: Reign of Valor	Yangon, Myanmar	Decision (Unanimous)	3	3:00
2018-10-26	Win	(Morocco) Ibrahim El Bouni	ONE Championship: Pursuit of Greatness	Yangon, Myanmar	TKO (Referee Stoppage)	3	2:26
2018-06-23	Win	(Cameroon) Alain Ngalani	ONE Championship: Pinnacle of Power	Beijing, China	TKO	3	1:49
2017-10-29	Win	(France) Nordine Mahieddine	World Fighting League	Almere, Netherlands	Decision	3	3:00
2017-04-23	Win	(Turkey) Gokhan Gedik	World Fighting League 5 : Champions vs. Champions	Almere, Netherlands	Decision	3	3:00
2016-12-03	Loss	(Turkey) Murat Aygun	Mix Fight Gala 20	Frankfurt, Germany	Ext R. Decision	4	3:00
2016-09-24	Win	(Turkey) Bilal Abu Ali	Mix Fight Gala	Istanbul, Turkey	TKO	2	2:05
2016-06-18	Loss	(Slovakia) Martin Pacas	W5 EUROPEAN LEAGUE XXXV	Prievidza, Slovakia	TKO	2	0:30
2016-02-16	Loss	(Russia) Kirill Kornilov	ACB KB 5: Let's Knock The Winter Out	Orel, Russia	TKO	2	1:35
2015-11-07	Win	(Ukraine) Roman Kryklia	SUPERKOMBAT World Grand Prix Final 2015, Final	Bucharest, Romania	Decision	3	3:00
Wins the SUPERKOMBAT World Grand Prix 2015.
2015-11-07	Win	(France) Nicolas Wamba	SUPERKOMBAT World Grand Prix Final 2015, Semi Finals	Bucharest, Romania	Decision	3	3:00
2015-10-16	Win	(Romania) Sebastian Ciobanu	ACB KB 3: Grand Prix Final	Sibiu, Romania	Decision	3	3:00
2015-04-29	Win	(Serbia) Sasha Polugic	Tatneft Cup 2015 - 1st Selection	Kazan, Russia	TKO	2	
2015-04-12	Loss	(Netherlands) Brian Douwes	World Fighting League	Hoofddorp, Netherlands	Decision	3	3:00
2014-09-27	Win	(Netherlands) Dexter Suisse	SUPERKOMBAT World Grand Prix IV, Qualification Tournament, Final	Almere, Netherlands	Decision	3	3:00
Wins the SUPERKOMBAT World Grand Prix IV.
2014-09-27	Win	(Turkey) Gurhan Degirmenci	SUPERKOMBAT World Grand Prix IV, Qualification Tournament, Semi Finals	Almere, Netherlands	TKO	1	3:00
2013-06-01	Draw	(Morocco) Ismael Lazaar	Fight Fans - Kickboxer V	Amsterdam, Netherlands	Decision	3	3:00
2013-03-16	Win	(Netherlands) Joey Kaptijn-Echter	Fight for Victory	Egmond aan Zee, Netherlands	Decision	3	3:00
2012-12-09	Win	(Netherlands) Kay Bult	FightFans	Netherlands	Decision	3	3:00
2012-05-27	Win	(Morocco) Yassin Bensallam	Slamm 7	Almere, Netherlands	Decision	3	3:00
Legend: Win Loss Draw/No contest Notes

== See also ==
- List of male kickboxers
