= Daniel Stefanovski =

Swiss kickboxer (b. 1996)

- Born: 27 March 1996 (age 30); Zürich, Switzerland
- Other names: Macedonian Warrior; The Pitbull
- Nationality: Macedonian
- Height: 1.83 m (6 ft 0 in)
- Weight: 81 kg (179 lb; 12.8 st)
- Division: Middleweight); Super Middleweight
- Fighting out of: Zürich, Switzerland
- Team: Top Team
- Years active: 2012 - present

Kickboxing record
- Total: 33
- Wins: 24
- By knockout: 18
- Losses: 9
- By knockout: 1
- Draws: 0

Daniel Stefanovski (born 27 March 1996) is a Swiss-Macedonian professional kickboxer. He is the former SUPERKOMBAT Light Heavyweight Champion.

== Kickboxing career ==
During the SUPERKOMBAT Dream event, Stefanovski fought Adelin Mihăilă for the inaugural SUPERKOMBAT Light Heavyweight title. He earned the chance to fight for the title, after winning a split decision against Imanol Rodríguez in a title eliminator fought in April 2017. Stefanovski won the SUPERKOMBAT title with a first round TKO of Adelin Mihăilă.

During the TTZ Fight Night, Stefanovski fought Sofiane Alilouche for the ISKA World Light Heavyweight K-1 title. He won the fight by a first round TKO. In his next fight, Stefanovski fought for the WKU World light-heavyweight title. He won the fight by a first round TKO.

During CWS Fight Night 06, Stefanovski fought Marco Baars for the CWS Light heavyweight title. He won the fight by a fourth round TKO.

== Championships and accomplishments ==
- CWS
  - 2019 CWS Light Heavyweight Championship
- Dynamite Fighting Show
  - Fight of the Night (One time) vs. Florin Lambagiu
- International Sport Karate Association
  - 2019 ISKA World Light Heavyweight K-1 Rules Championship
- Superkombat Fighting Championship
  - 2018 SUPERKOMBAT Light Heavyweight Championship
- World Kickboxing and Karate Union
  - 2019 WKU World –79 kg Championship
  - 2023 WKU K-1 World -83 kg kg Championship
- World Professional Kickboxing Council
  - 2016 WPKC European –80 kg/176 lb Championship

== Kickboxing record ==
Professional kickboxing record
24 wins (18 KOs), 9 losses, 1 draws
| Date | Result | Opponent | Event | Location | Method | Round | Time |
| 2026-02-07 | Loss | (Spain) Vajtan Shanava | Gladiators Night 12 | Dietikon, Switzerland | Decision | 3 | 3:00 |
| 2025-06-14 | Win | (Germany) Steavano Tuekpe | Gladiators Night 10 | Dietikon, Switzerland | TKO | | |
| 2024-12-07 | Loss | (Azerbaijan) Bahram Rajabzadeh | Glory Collision 7 | Arnhem, Netherlands | TKO (3 Knockdowns) | 1 | 2:30 |
| 2024-10-11 | Draw | (Poland) Robert Krasoń | Strike King 3 | Piotrków Trybunalski, Poland | Ext.R Decision | 4 | 3:00 |
| 2024-09-28 | Win | (France) Daniel Krost | Gladiators Night 8 | Dietikon, Switzerland | Decision (unanimous) | 3 | 3:00 |
| 2024-06-15 | Win | (Romania) Bodgan Slabu | Gladiators Night 7 | Dietikon, Switzerland | Decision (unanimous) | 3 | 3:00 |
| 2024-02-17 | Win | (Albania) Siliano Allajbeu | Gladiators Night 6 | Dietikon, Switzerland | TKO (Corner stoppage) | 2 | 1:21 |
| 2023-09-29 | Win | (Greece) Valentinos Kyriakidis | Reunion Promotion | Dietikon, Switzerland | Decision (unanimous) | 3 | 3:00 |
| 2023-06-17 | Win | (Brazil) Rodrigo Mineiro | Gladiators Night 5 | Dietikon, Switzerland | Decision (unanimous) | 5 | 3:00 |
Wins the vacant WKU K-1 World -83kg Championship
| 2021-11-01 | Win | (Morocco) Taha Alami Marrouni | Superkombat Universe | Dubai, UAE | Decision (unanimous) | 3 | 3:00 |
| 2019-12-14 | Win | (Netherlands) Marco Baars | CWS Fight Night 06 | Neu-Ulm, Germany | TKO (towel thrown) | 4 | 1:19 |
Won the CWS Light Heavyweight Championship.
| 2019-10-27 | Win | (Serbia) Nikola Zorić | BPN Vol. 21 | Novi Sad, Serbia | TKO (towel thrown) | 2 | 2:58 |
| 2019-09-27 | Loss | (Romania) Florin Lambagiu | Dynamite Fighting Show 5: Team Moroșanu vs. Team Bonjasky | Piatra Neamț, Romania | Decision (unanimous) | 3 | 3:00 |
| 2019-06-15 | Win | (Guinea-Bissau) Janilson da Cruz | Gladiators Night | Dietikon, Switzerland | KO (right punch) | 1 | 1:45 |
Won the WKU World –79 kg/174 lb Championship.
| 2019-04-13 | Win | (France) Sofiane Alilouche | TTZ Fight Night | Zürich, Switzerland | TKO (corner stoppage) | 1 | 2:11 |
Won the ISKA World Light Heavyweight K-1 Rules Championship.
| 2018-10-28 | Win | (Switzerland) Beni Osmanoski | Ready 4 War 7 | Schlieren, Switzerland | TKO (referee stoppage) | 1 | 2:52 |
| 2018-09-09 | Loss | (China) Yang Yu | Kunlun Fight 76 | Zhangqiu, China | Decision (unanimous) | 3 | 3:00 |
| 2018-05-31 | Loss | (Uzbekistan) Sher Mamazulunov | 2018 TatNeft Cup | Kazan, Russia | Decision | 3 | 3:00 |
| 2018-03-25 | Win | (Romania) Adelin Mihăilă | SUPERKOMBAT Dream | Bucharest, Romania | KO (punches) | 1 | 1:34 |
Won the inaugural SUPERKOMBAT Light Heavyweight Championship.
| 2017-12-14 | Loss | (Latvia) Stanislavs Makarenko | 2017 TatNeft Cup | Kazan, Russia | Decision | 3 | 3:00 |
| 2017-07-10 | Loss | (Netherlands) Sem Braan | K-1 World GP 2017 Andy Hug Memorial, Semi Finals | Zug, Switzerland | Decision (unanimous) | 3 | 3:00 |
| 2017-05-06 | Win | (Guinea-Bissau) Janilson da Cruz | SUPERKOMBAT World Grand Prix II 2017 | Madrid, Spain | TKO (3 knockdowns rule) | 1 | 1:05 |
| 2017-04-07 | Win | (Spain) Imanol Rodríguez | SUPERKOMBAT World Grand Prix I 2017 | Bucharest, Romania | Decision (split) | 3 | 3:00 |
SUPERKOMBAT Light Heavyweight Title Eliminator.
| 2017-03-12 | Win | (Romania) Alex Filip | SUPERKOMBAT New Heroes 10 | Bucharest, Romania | TKO (referee stoppage) | 3 | 0:21 |
| 2016-11-12 | Win | (Romania) Bogdan Năstase | SUPERKOMBAT World Grand Prix 2016 Final | Bucharest, Romania | Decision (unanimous) | 3 | 3:00 |
| 2016-10-01 | Win | (Romania) Ionuț Șandur | SUPERKOMBAT World Grand Prix 2016 Final Elimination | Iași, Romania | TKO (3 Knockdowns rule) | 3 | 2:41 |
| 2016-09-24 | Loss | (Turkey) Mustafa Genç | Casino Thai Fight | Baden, Switzerland | Decision (unanimous) | 5 | 3:00 |
For the AFSO European Light Heavyweight Oriental Rules Championship.
| 2016-06-25 | Win | (Germany) Efe Sipahi | Ready 4 War 6 | Zürich, Switzerland | KO (jumping knee) | 1 | 2:55 |
| 2016-05-28 | Win | (Switzerland) Kevin Buser | AFC 3 | Aarau, Switzerland | KO (punches) | 3 | 0:15 |
| 2016-02-27 | Win | (Turkey) Mehmet Balık | Illyrian Fight Night | Winterthur, Switzerland | TKO (towel thrown) | 4 | 1:50 |
Won the WPKC European -80 kg/176 lb Championship.
| 2015-10 | Loss | (Turkey) Selahattin Şahin | | | Decision (split) | 5 | 3:00 |
| 2015-10-03 | Win | (Switzerland) Levent Liechti | Fight4Glory IV | Reinach, Switzerland | Decision | 5 | 3:00 |
| 2014-09-13 | Win | (Bosnia and Herzegovina) Aleksandar Vuruna | Gladiators Night | Baden, Switzerland | KO (knee to the head) | 2 | 2:33 |
| 2012-09-08 | Win | (Germany) Simon Walter | Prestige Fight Night | Baden, Switzerland | Decision (split) | 3 | 3:00 |
Legend: Win Loss Draw/No contest Notes

== See also ==
- List of male kickboxers
