= Fight Now TV =

- Fight Now TV logo
- Country: Canada
- Broadcast area: National

Ownership
- Owner: Channel Zero

History
- Launched: May 24, 2011
- Closed: June 30, 2014

Links
- Website: Fight Now TV

Fight Now TV was a Canadian English language specialty channel devoted to airing programming related to wrestling, boxing, mixed martial arts, and other combat sports. Along with airing live events, Fight Now TV also aired fight-related programming such as news, news magazines, taped sports events, and more.

The channel was founded and owned by Channel Zero Inc and was launched on May 24, 2011, as a 24-hour-a-day, seven-day-a-week combat sports channel. The channel ceased broadcasting on June 30, 2014, citing difficulties achieving long-term viability due to difficulties within the sports genre such as industry consolidation, increased re-transmission fees, insufficient subscribers, and declining video margins.
