= Oradea Shopping City =

- Location: Oradea, Romania
- Opened: 14 October 2011
- Developer: Mivan
- Owner: Sapient Center SA
- Architect: Dico și Țigănaș
- Floor area: 25,000 square metres (269,098 sq ft)
- Floors: 1
- Parking: 1,000

Oradea Shopping City was a large shopping mall located in Oradea, Romania. It was originally developed by Irish company Mivan Group as Tiago Mall. In May 2010 was the first mall in Romania that went bankrupt, before opening.

The center include around 150 stores and a multiplex with eight screens. The complex has a floor area of 46,600 square metres (501,598 sq ft) and 1,000 parking spaces.

Shopping Center Holding took over Tiago Mall and after an investment of 50 million€ opened on 14 October 2011 Oradea Shopping City. In 2017 Oradea Shopping City was closed and its owner Shopping Center Holding went bankrupt.

On 4 September 2018 it was announced that Oradea Shopping City was bought by Sapient Center SA, for the sum of 8 million€. Sapient Center SA has 70% of the shares held by Lotus Market and 30% by Sapient Imobiliare.
