= Pascal Touré =

French Muay Thai kickboxer

- Born: October 27, 1995 (age 30)
- Nationality: French
- Height: 1.92 m (6 ft 3 1/2 in)
- Weight: 95 kg (209 lb; 15.0 st)
- Division: Super Middleweight
- Style: Muay Thai, kickboxing
- Fighting out of: Lyon, France
- Team: Gym boxing St Fons - Team Nasser K.
- Trainer: Nasser Kacem
- Years active: 2014–present

Kickboxing record
- Total: 27
- Wins: 16
- By knockout: 4
- Losses: 11
- By knockout: 2

Pascal Touré (born October 27, 1995) is a French Muay Thai kickboxer.

As of April 2023, Touré was the #10 ranked light heavyweight kickboxer in the world according to Combat Press.

== Martial arts career ==
=== Early career ===
On March 16, 2019, Touré faced Françesko Xhaja at Power Trophy XX. He lost by technical knockout in the second round.

On November 9, 2019, Touré travelled to Slovakia to face Ivan Bartek at a King of Kings event. He lost the fight by unanimous decision.

Touré faced Anthony Leroy at La Nuit Des Challenges 19 on December 14, 2019. He won the fight by decision.

On February 8, 2020, Touré defeated Massinissa Hamaili by split decision at Empire Fight.

Touré participated in the K-1 Event -95 kg tournament, held on December 4, 2021. He reached the tournament final after defeating Frangis Goma by decision in the semifinals. He lost to Stéphane Susperregui by decision in the final in a fight where both fighters went down. Touré entered the same tournament at K-1 Event 15 on July 2, 2022. He won the tournament, defeating Rodny Belfroy and Mikhail Tyuterev both by decision.

Touré faced Sándor Kertész at La Nuit des Challenges 21 on December 3, 2022. He won the fight by technical knockout in the third round.

Touré was scheduled to face former Glory Kickboxing champion Artem Vakhitov on February 2, 2023, at Muaythai Factory. He lost the fight by unanimous decision.

=== Glory ===
Touré faced Ștefan Lătescu at Glory 88 on September 9, 2023. He lost the fight by unanimous decision.

Touré faced Marios Blanas for the vacant WKN K-1 European -95 kg title at Nuit Des Challenges 22 on December 2, 2023. He won the fight by a second-round technical knockout.

Touré faced Mohamed Amine Glory 91 on April 27, 2024. He won the fight by split decision.

Touré faced Tarik Khbabez in the quarterfinals of the Glory Light Heavyweight Grand Prix on June 8, 2024. He lost the fight by unanimous decision.

== Fight record ==
Kickboxing & Muay Thai record
16 Wins (4 (T)KOs), 11 Losses
Date	Result	Opponent	Event	Location	Method	Round	Time
2025-11-22	Loss	(Italy) Enrico Pellegrino	Fight Clubbing 39	Pescara, Italy	Decision (unanimous)	3	3:00
2024-12-07	Loss	(Turkey) Cem Cáceres	Glory Collision 7	Arnhem, Netherlands	Decision (unanimous)	3	3:00
2024-06-08	Loss	(Morocco) Tarik Khbabez	Glory Light Heavyweight Grand Prix, Quarterfinals	Rotterdam, Netherlands	Decision (unanimous)	3	3:00
2024-04-27	Win	(Morocco) Mohamed Amine	Glory 91	Paris, France	Decision (split)	3	3:00
2023-12-02	Win	(Greece) Marios Blanas	Nuit Des Challenges 22	Saint-Fons, France	TKO	2	
Wins the vacant WKN K-1 European -95kg title.
2023-09-09	Loss	(Romania) Ștefan Lătescu	Glory 88	Paris, France	Decision (unanimous)	3	3:00
2023-02-02	Loss	(Russia) Artem Vakhitov	Muaythai Factory	Kemerovo, Russia	Decision (unanimous)	3	3:00
2022-12-03	Win	(Hungary) Sándor Kertész	La Nuit des Challenges 21	Saint-Fons, France	TKO (referee stoppage/punch)	3	
2022-07-02	Win	(Russia) Mikhail Tyuterev	K-1 Event Gold Edition, Tournament Final	Troyes, France	Decision	3	3:00
Wins the K-1 Event Gold Edition Tournament.
2022-07-02	Win	(France) Rodny Belfroy	K-1 Event Gold Edition, Tournament Semifinals	Troyes, France	Decision	3	3:00
2021-12-04	Loss	(France) Stéphane Susperregui	K-1 Event 14, Tournament Finals	Troyes, France	Decision	3	3:00
For the K-1 Event -95kg tournament title.
2021-12-04	Win	(France) Frangis Goma	K-1 Event 14, Tournament Semifinals	Troyes, France	Decision	3	3:00
2021-09-30	Win	(Italy) Franck Kanate	MFC 8	Roussillon, France	TKO (corner stoppage)	1	
2020-02-08	Win	(France) Massinissa Hamaili	Empire Fight	Montbéliard, France	Decision (split)	3	3:00
2019-12-14	Win	(France) Anthony Leroy	La Nuit Des Challenges 19	Saint-Fons, France	Decision (unanimous)	3	3:00
2019-11-09	Loss	(Slovakia) Ivan Bartek	KOK'79 in Slovakia	Liptovsky Mikulas, Slovakia	Decision (unanimous)	3	3:00
2019-03-16	Loss	(Albania) Françesko Xhaja	Power Trophy XX	Orange, France	TKO	2	
2018-10-06	Loss	(France) Sofian Laidouni	Challenge	St-Amand-les-Eaux, France	Decision (unanimous)	3	3:00
2018-05-05	Win	(France) Tommy Blanco	La Nuit de la Boxe	Troyes, France	Decision (unanimous)	3	3:00
2018-04-12	Loss	(Serbia) Rade Opačić	Collision Fighting League 2	Serbia	TKO (punches)	3	2:55
2018-03-17	Win	(France) Karim Bidouch	Power Trophy 2018	Orange, France	TKO (3 knockdowns)	1	
Legend: Win Loss Draw/no contest Notes

== See also ==
- List of male kickboxers
