= K-1 =

Kickboxing promotion

M-1 Sports Media Ltd.
- Type: Private
- Industry: Martial-arts entertainment planning and promotion
- Predecessor: Seidokaikan
- Founded: 1993
- Founders: Kazuyoshi Ishii
- Headquarters: Shibuya-ku, Tokyo, Japan
- Owner: M-1 Sports Media Co., Ltd
- Website: k-1.co.jp

K-1 is a professional kickboxing promotion, founded in 1993 by martial artist Kazuyoshi Ishii. It is currently owned and operated by M-1 Sports Media Co, Ltd and based in Tokyo.

Ishii, a karateka and founder of the Seidokaikan school, created K-1 with the aim of bringing practitioners of different striking disciplines together in a unified competition, under a common set of rules. The promotion became known for its Grand Prix tournaments: most notably the K-1 World Grand Prix, its flagship tournament for heavyweight and open-weight fighters, and K-1 World MAX, a tournament originally established for fighters at 70 kg. The letter K in K-1 is officially designated as a representation of words karate, kickboxing, kung fu, kempo, [tae]kwondo, which together form kakutougi (the generic Japanese term for "combat sports"). While the "1" component pertains to the single weight division (in earlier competition) and the champion's unique position.

At its peak, K-1 was considered to be the largest Kickboxing and combat sports organization in the world. K-1 also promoted mixed martial arts events, with some events having both kickboxing and MMA matches on their cards (such as their Dynamite!! series). This golden era is generally considered to have lasted from the 1990s through the 2000s, during which K-1 achieved substantial commercial success in Japan and internationally, drawing large audiences to its events, securing major television broadcasting deals, and attracting fighters from around the world. In 2003, K-1 founder Kazuyoshi Ishii was arrested on charges of tax evasion, and subsequently stepped down from his position. Sadaharu Tanikawa established the Fighting and Entertainment Group (FEG) in September 2003, which assumed responsibility for K-1's operations. Under FEG, K-1 continued to enjoy considerable success through the 2000s, particularly through its major televised events in Japan. However, financial difficulties faced by FEG disrupted the promotion's operations, while the cancellation and restructuring of events contributed to a loss of K-1's position as one of the world's leading combat sports promotion. FEG ultimately ceased operations and went bankrupt in 2012.

The K-1 brand and its associated rights subsequently passed to K-1 Global Holdings Limited, a company registered in Hong Kong, which sought to revive the promotion on an international basis. K-1 Global promoted events under the K-1 name during the early 2010s, although the organization underwent further changes in ownership and management during this period. K-1 remained an established kickboxing promotion, particularly in Japan, but did not regain its former position as the world's leading combat sports promotion, with other organizations such as GLORY emerged as major international promotions. In 2023, global rights to the K-1 brand were acquired by M-1 Sports Media.

K-1 has its own ruleset, derived from kickboxing and incorporating elements of other striking styles, that permits punches, low kicks, head and body kicks, and knee strikes while prohibiting elbows and throws and restricting clinching. Because of its popularity, “K-1” is sometimes used to refer to a distinct ruleset or style of kickboxing, rather than solely to the Japanese promotion. Kickboxing governing bodies such as the ISKA and WKN have also crowned their own "K-1 rules" champions, while major kickboxing promotions such as GLORY, ONE Championship, RISE and others have adopted rulesets heavily influenced by K-1.

== History ==
=== Founding and early era ===
K-1's predecessor, Seidokaikan karate, was formed in 1980 by Kazuyoshi Ishii, a former Kyokushin karate practitioner who had formed his own organization to help promote the best stand-up martial artists. Seidokaikan arranged several successful challenge events against other martial arts organizations, originally using rules based on the Kyokushin Knockdown karate rules, but gradually adapting and changing closer to kickboxing rules. K-1's concept was also influenced by Fighting Network RINGS, a combat sports promotion founded by professional wrestler Akira Maeda in 1991, particularly its international approach to promoting competition between fighters from different martial arts backgrounds. Seidokaikan fighters, including Masaaki Satake and Nobuaki Kakuda, regularly competed in RINGS between 1991 and 1993, while Dutch fighters associated with RINGS, including Peter Aerts and Ernesto Hoost, went on to become prominent K-1 competitors. In 1993, Ishii founded the K-1 exclusively as a kickboxing organization, closely cooperating with, but independent from Seidokaikan.

Ishii envisioned K-1 as a competition that would determine the world's strongest stand-up fighter by bringing together champions and top competitors from different striking disciplines, including karate, kickboxing, kung fu, kenpō, taekwondo and Muay Thai, under a unified ruleset that allowed them to compete on equal terms. K-1's first event, K-1 Sanctuary I '93, was held on March 30, 1993, at Korakuen Hall in Tokyo with the modest attendance of 2,100 spectators. The eight-bout card featured primarily K-1's kickboxing ruleset, the main event saw Masaaki Satake defeat Chris Brannell by knockout, while kickboxers Stan Longinidis and Adam Watt and karate practitioner Taiei Kin also competed on the card. The card also featured two mixed-rules bouts involving fighters from Japan's shoot-style professional wrestling and emerging mixed martial arts scene. Naoyuki Taira defeated pro wrestler Katsumi Usuda by submission and Nobuaki Kakuda fought Yoshinori Nishi to a draw. The event marked the beginning of K-1 as a promotion.

The letter K in K-1 is officially designated as a representation of words karate, kickboxing and kung fu. Nevertheless, some reports suggest that it represents the initial K found in competing disciplines such as karate, kickboxing, kung fu, kempo, kakutougi (the generic Japanese term for "combat sports"), and taekwondo. Another theory claims that the K simply comes from kakutougi and the "1" component pertains to the single weight division (in earlier competition) and the champion's unique position. The promotion has also held several tournaments under the names "K-2" and "K-3" from 1993 to 1995.

K-1 held its inaugural Grand Prix a month later on April 30, 1993, at the Yoyogi National Gymnasium in Tokyo, as part of Fuji Television's LIVE UFO event, and with the attendance of 12,000 spectators. The eight-man tournament featured fighters from seven countries, including Japanese karate champion Masaaki Satake, American kickboxer and future UFC Heavyweight Champion Maurice Smith, Dutch kickboxer Peter Aerts, American Full Contact champion Todd Hays, Thai champion Changpuek Kiatsongrit, and Dutch Muay Thai champion Ernesto Hoost. The tournament was won by Croatia's Branko Cikatić, who defeated Kiatsongrit, Satake, and Hoost, all by knockout, to become the first K-1 World Grand Prix champion and claim a $100,000 prize. The event established the one-night Grand Prix tournament as K-1's signature format and helped establish the promotion as an international combat-sports organization.

From 1993 through the 2000s, K-1 grew into one of the world's largest combat sports promotions. The annual K-1 World Grand Prix became its flagship tournament, bringing together elite kickboxers, karate practitioners and other striking specialists from around the world. Peter Aerts, Andy Hug, Ernesto Hoost, Mark Hunt, Remy Bonjasky and Semmy Schilt became some of the promotion's most prominent stars, with Hoost and Schilt eventually winning the World Grand Prix four times each. K-1 also expanded internationally, holding events across Europe, North America, Oceania and Asia. In 2002, the promotion introduced K-1 World MAX, a 70 kg tournament that became a major counterpart to the heavyweight World Grand Prix and featured fighters such as Masato, Buakaw, Andy Souwer and Albert Kraus.

By the end of the 1990s, K-1 had become a major spectator sport in Japan, with its largest events held at the Tokyo Dome, and as major television and live-event presence in Japan through its relationship with Fuji Television. The 2000 K-1 World Grand Prix Final attracted 70,200 spectators, followed by 74,500 at the 2002 final, the promotion's highest recorded attendance. The World Grand Prix finals continued to draw large crowds in the following years, with 67,320 spectators attending the 2003 final and 64,819 attending the 2004 final. On television, K-1 also attracted high ratings, with millions of spectators, with the 2002 World Grand Prix Final recording a 28.4% rating in Japan.

=== Fighting and Entertainment Group era ===
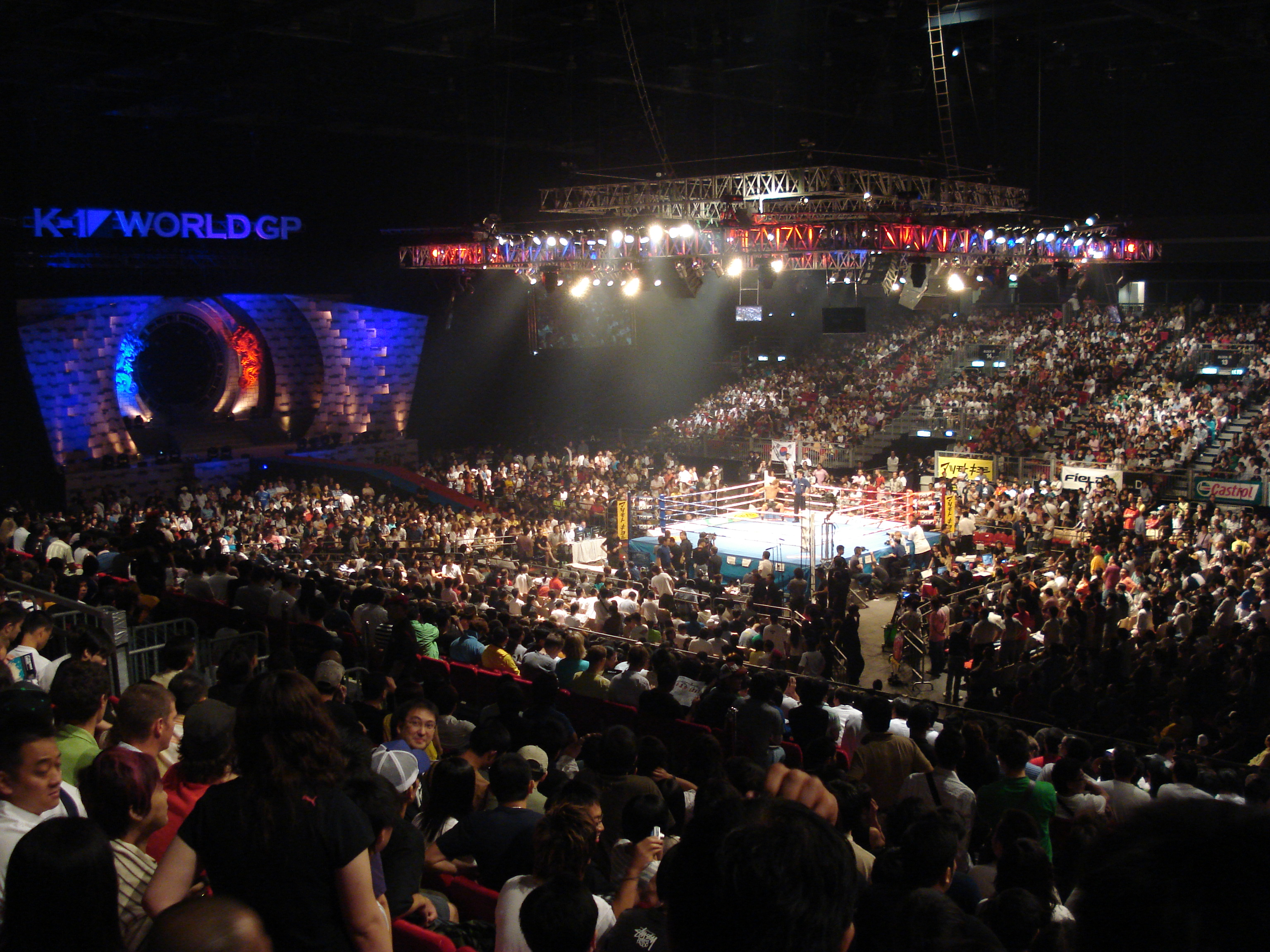
A bout during the K-1 World Grand Prix 2007 in Hong Kong

In 2003, Ishii was arrested and later convicted of tax evasion, sports journalist and Ishii's acquaintance Sadaharu Tanikawa was his successor, creating the Fighting and Entertainment Group (FEG) to assume control of K-1's operations. Under FEG, K-1 increasingly adopted a more entertainment-focused presentation influenced by Japanese professional wrestling, placing greater emphasis on spectacle, fighter personalities, promotional storylines and television appeal alongside the sporting competition. K-1 remained commercially successful throughout the mid-2000s, with major events broadcast on Japanese television and internationally. This was particularly evident in the annual New Year's Eve K-1 Premium Dynamite!! events, which combined K-1 bouts with MMA and crossover attractions and became major television events in Japan. The events regularly attracted audiences to large stadiums, the innaugural edition, a co-promotion between FEG and Dream Stage Entertainment (DSE), the parent company of the popular MMA event PRIDE Fighting Championships, attracted live audience of 91,108 people, which is the largest on-record attendance for either organization and the largest attendance in the history of both MMA and kickboxing. Following disagreements between DSE and FEG, the two companies ended their partnership, and the 2003 edition was produced solely by FEG under the K-1 Premium Dynamite!! name. Although attendance fell to 43,560 spectators that year, subsequent editions again attracted more than 50,000 spectators, including 52,918 in 2004, 53,025 in 2005 and 51,930 in 2006. The New Year's Eve K-1 PREMIUM 2003 Dynamite!! broadcast averaged a 19.5% television rating on TBS Network outperforming its competitors Pride Shockwave 2003 (12,2%) and Antonio Inoki's Inoki Bom-Ba-Ye 2003 (5,1%) and reached a peak rating of 43.0% during the Bob Sapp–Akebono bout, surpassing NHK's Kōhaku Uta Gassen, an annual New Year's Eve music program and one of Japan's most-watched television broadcasts, the during the same period.

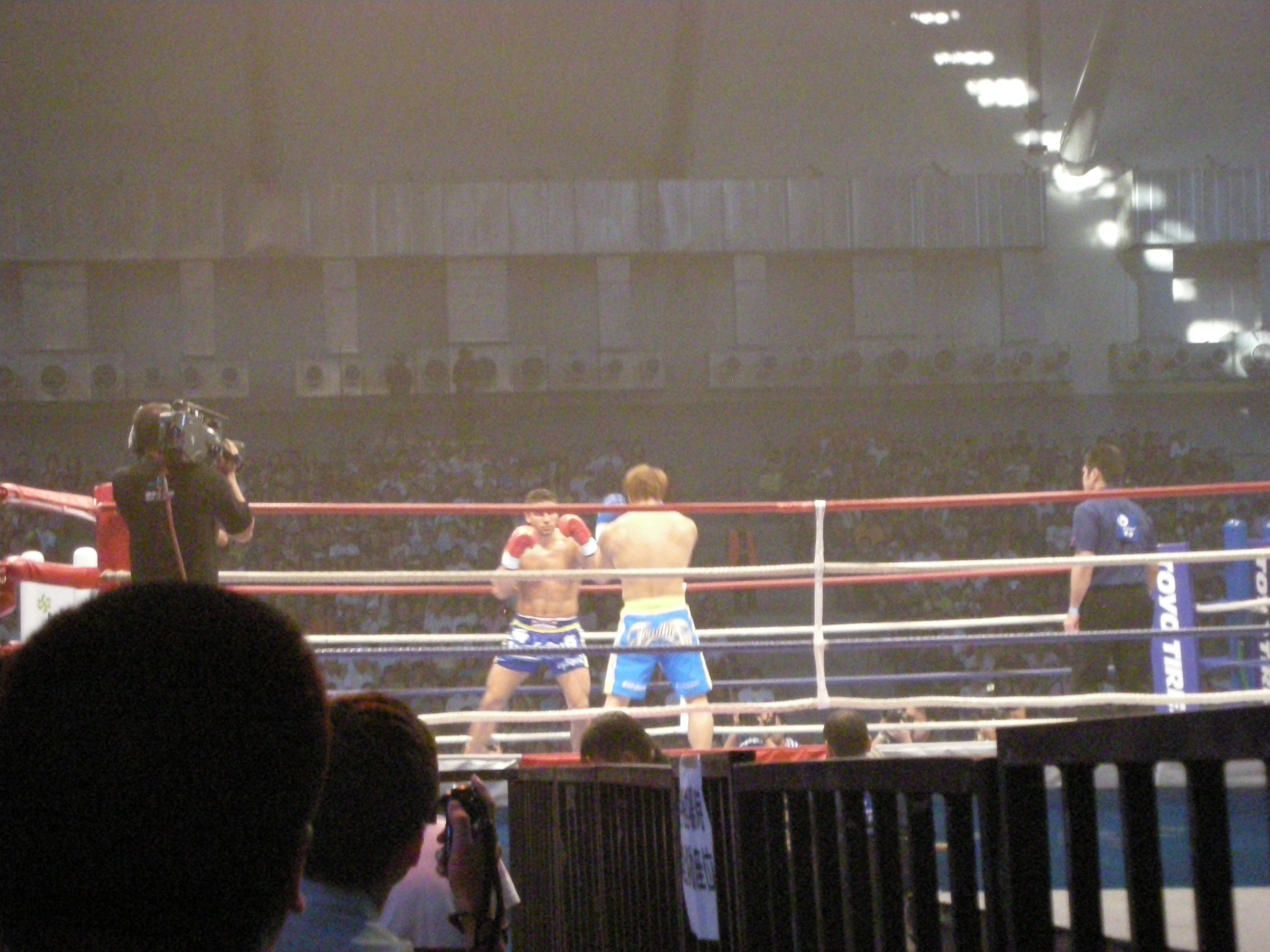
A match at the K-1 World Grand Prix 2008 in Taipei

At this time, FEG also expanded into mixed martial arts (MMA), initially with MMA bouts on its K-1 cards before launching K-1 HERO'S in 2005 as a dedicated MMA promotion. HERO'S featured both established MMA fighters and K-1 competitors, allowing FEG to expand its roster beyond kickboxing. Following the decline and closure of PRIDE Fighting Championships in 2007, FEG partnered with former PRIDE executives to establish DREAM in 2008. DREAM succeeded HERO'S as FEG's principal MMA promotion and continued to operate alongside K-1.

The promotion continued to attract major international fighters and large audiences, but its increasingly costly business model became difficult to sustain as television revenues, sponsorship and audience interest in Japanese combat sports declined. The decline was exacerbated by the collapse of Japan's kakutogi boom following the 2006 scandal over alleged links between PRIDE and the yakuza, which led Fuji Television to terminate its broadcasting relationship with PRIDE and contributed to a broader deterioration in television and sponsorship opportunities for Japanese combat sports promotions. FEG also faced problems of its own, including the financial and reputational consequences of K-1 founder Kazuyoshi Ishii's tax-evasion conviction, rising fighter purses and difficulty replacing sponsors, while simultaneously financing and promoting both K-1 and the newly established DREAM, which required substantial investment in fighters, production and major events. By the end of the decade, FEG was experiencing mounting financial difficulties, including delays in paying fighters and a reduction in the number of events it could stage.

=== Financial issues and corporate changes ===
In 2010, rumours began to surface regarding financial issues with K-1, and parent company FEG. Simon Rutz, the owner of the Dutch-based kickboxing promotion It's Showtime, claimed in January 2011 that some fighters from It's Showtime had not been paid for fights in K-1.

In early 2011, FEG publicly announced that they were facing financial problems and that the organization would take some months off to restructure. Many fighters and managers spoke out against FEG, due to unpaid fight purses, as well as objections to the direction that its owner was taking K-1.

The entire K-1 brand, along with most of its trademarks, with the exception of, 'K-1 Koshien', 'K-1 MAX' and 'Dream', were sold to Japanese real estate firm, Barbizon Corporation Limited, on July 28, 2011.

=== Acquisition and restructuring (2012–2023) ===
On February 1, 2012, EMCOM Entertainment Inc. purchased K-1 from Barbizon. In March 2012, It's Showtime announced that EMCOM Entertainment established a new company K-1 Global Holdings Ltd. in Hong Kong. K-1 Global Holdings, Ltd., became the new official owner of the K-1 brand. K-1 Global's agreement with promotion required that certain fighters signed under It's Showtime appear in upcoming K-1 Global events.

The K-1 World MAX Final 16 took place on May 27, 2012, at the Palacio Vistalegre in Madrid, Spain. After the event, controversy and rumors circulated over fighters not being paid for their performances, unpaid financial obligations of FEG, and the incomplete transfer of ownership of the K-1 name. As a result, the K-1 World Grand Prix scheduled for 2012 would be cancelled if these issues were not resolved. The chairman of the new K-1 resolved these issues by paying fighters what was owed and including a 50% bonus.

It was announced in June 2012 that It's Showtime was purchased by Glory Sports International, eventually to be merged in their new promotion GLORY.

On August 10, 2012, K-1's co-promotion agreement with Romanian-based kickboxing promotion SUPERKOMBAT was announced. Though the agreement would eventually end, SK president Eduard Irimia stated that while its company will be independent in 2013 it will still continue to have cooperation with any interested promotion, including K-1, by offering fighters.

==== Relaunch by M-1 Sports Media ====
On May 29, 2014, the launch of a "K-1 World League" in Japan was announced. It is considered to be a separate entity from the K-1 of 2012, with the World League acquiring naming rights and exclusive license for the Japanese region from K-1 Global Holding Ltd. "K-1 World League" would focus on fighters in the 55 kg, -60 kg, -65 kg, -70 kg and heavyweight weight classes; and would be structured around professional events, amateur competitions and K-1 gyms. M-1 Sports Media is in charge of planning and production. The "World League" would be officially named K-1 World GP on September 24, 2014.

After its formation, "K-1 World League" formally incorporated the Krush brand. Launched prior to the folding of FEG, in 2009, Krush was a collaboration between K-1 and AJKF. It was seen at the time as the second tier of K-1 competition, and produced a number of future K-1 fighters such as Takeru Segawa, Tatsuya Tsubakihara and Leona Pettas, among others. K-1 would later add the KHAOS brand, which is seen as the third tier of competition, as a stepping stone between amateur and professional competition. K-1 maintains a number of gyms throughout Japan, from which potential kickboxers can transition from training to amateur competition to professional competition. A fighter can viably spend their entire career under the K-1 umbrella.

On September 20, 2016, "K-1 World GP" executive producer Kensaku Maeda retired, and was subsequently replaced by the Krush executive producer Mitsuru Miyata.

From June 2017 onward, "K-1 World GP" started once again started holding events at the Saitama Super Arena. It was further revealed that fighters were signed exclusively to K-1, which wasn't the case previously.

On December 17, 2018, it was announced that the former Krush and K-1 commentator and martial arts writer Takumi Nakamura would replace Mitsuru Miyata as the executive producer.

On January 26, 2019, Krush was renamed "K-1 KRUSH FIGHT" to further announce the connection between the two brands. However, on December 7, 2019, it was renamed back to Krush. The aim of renaming the competition back to Krush was to dispel the image of the brand as the second tier of K-1.

=== 2023–present ===
On February 10, 2023, K-1 agreed on a mutual exchange of fighters with fellow Japanese promotion RISE, after they successfully co-promoted the Tenshin Nasukawa vs. Takeru crossover pay-per-view event, known as "THE MATCH 2022".

On February 28, 2023, M-1 Sports Media acquired the global licensing rights for the K-1 brand, which was from that point forward managed by K-1 International Federation (KIF).

On July 17, 2023, Takumi Nakamura stepped down from the position of producer.

Former Glory Japan General Manager Carlos Kikuta was announced as the new K-1 producer on July 18, 2023. That same day, K-1 announced a collaborative event with Quintet called ReBOOT, which will be held on September 10, 2023. The promotion subsequently announced their intention to re-brand their weight classes (under the "K-1 WORLD GP" and "K-1 WORLD MAX" banners, for heavyweights and fighters weighting -75 kg and under, respectively), that they would hold a heavyweight World Grand Prix, as well as a new partnership with Kyokushinkaikan.

On August 8, 2023, former executive producer Mitsuru Miyata was appointed as the Krush producer. On January 19, 2024, Kazuyoshi Ishii was appointed as an advisor. On December 17, 2024, Mitsuru Miyata would succeed Carlos Kikuta as K-1 producer, now producing both K-1 and Krush.

In September 2025, Genki Sudo became the new K-1 producer and announced the return of the Hero's MMA brand. K-1 Genki 2026 on April 11, 2026 would see K-1 hold MMA bouts under Hero's rules for the first time since the promotion was discontinued in 2008.

== Rules ==
K-1 rules are as follows:

- The fights are contested in a ring which is six or more meters square and surrounded by four ropes.
- Only striking techniques such as punches, sweeps, kicks and knees are allowed. Clinching is allowed (Only for 5 seconds)
- Throws, headbutts, any grabbing of the opponent and strikes with the elbow are prohibited. Furthermore, spitting, biting, groin strikes, strikes to the back of the head, striking after the round has ended or the referee has called for a break, striking while the opponent is knocked down and excessive holding are all considered fouls.
- Matches, both regular and title matches, are contested in three three-minute rounds. In case of a draw, an extension round is fought.
- If a fighter is knocked down during the fight, the referee will begin counting to eight until the fighter rises from the canvas. The referee can interrupt the count, or forgo it completely, if he deems the fighter unable to continue competing. Should the fighter remain downed by the time the referee has counted to eight, he is ruled as knocked out and the other fighter will be ruled the winner by knockout.
- Matches are scored based on four criteria:
  - (1) Number of knockdowns a fighter has scored, with three knockdowns inside of a single round resulting in a technical knockout (two in tournament bouts)
  - (2) Presence or absence of damage to the opponent
  - (3) The number clean strikes, with strikes which are thrown with fight ending intention scoring more highly than those thrown with the intent of racking up points
  - (4) Aggressiveness

== List of K-1 events ==
While under the FEG ownership, K-1 events were centred around the K-1 World Grand Prix, including qualifying tournaments and preliminaries held around the world.

Under the "K-1 World GP" brand from 2014, K-1 events almost exclusively took place in Japan. Its schedule would feature a mix between traditional, single-fight, and one-night tournaments to determine the weight-class champions.

The following is a list of countries that K-1 has held events in chronological order:

- Japan (1993–)
- Netherlands (1994–)
- France (1995–)
- Switzerland (1995–)
- United States (1998–)
- Australia (2000–)
- England (2000–)
- Italy (2000–)
- Germany (2000–)
- Belarus (2000–)
- Croatia (2000–)
- South Africa (2000–)
- New Zealand (2000–)
- Czech Republic (2000–)
- Denmark (2001–)
- Ukraine (2001–)
- Spain (2002–)
- Brazil (2002–)
- Sweden (2003–)
- Russia (2003–)
- Bosnia and Herzegovina (2003–)
- Scotland (2004–)
- Portugal (2004–)
- Poland (2004–)
- South Korea (2004–)
- Slovenia (2005–)
- Hungary (2005–)
- Lithuania (2006–)
- Latvia (2006–)
- Turkey (2007–)
- Belgium (2007–)
- Estonia (2007–)
- Romania (2007–)
- Hong Kong (2007–)
- Austria (2008–)
- Taiwan (2008–)
- Moldova (2009–)
- China (2013–)
- Greece (2012–)
- Canada (2013–)
- (Republic of Ireland) Ireland (2013–)
- Azerbaijan (2014–)
- Thailand (2014–)
- Serbia (2016–)

== Tournament format ==
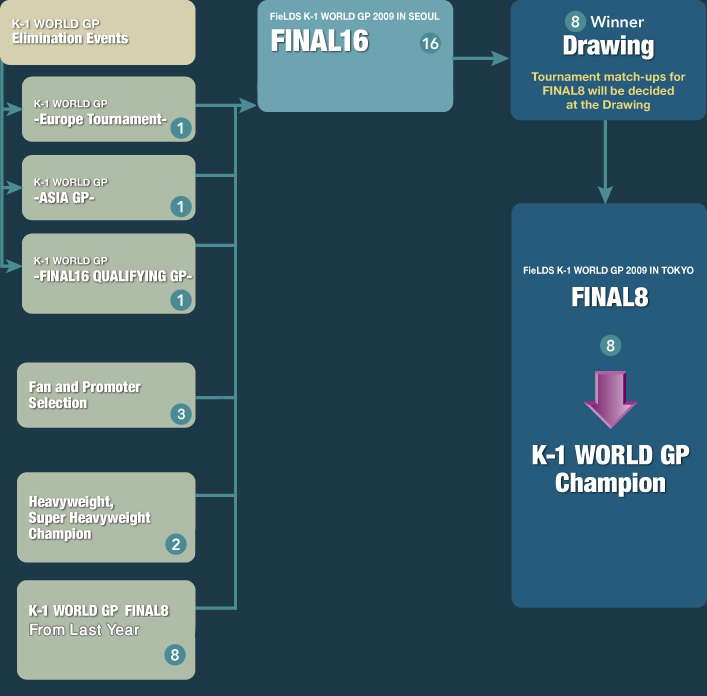
K-1 Qualifying System 2009

=== K-1 Grand Prix ===
The original K-1 Grand Prix is a single-event tournament held in Japan where competitors participated on invitation. By 1998, K-1 introduced the K-1 World Grand Prix format composed of K-1 Regional Elimination Tournaments (theoretically amounting to six), which qualify fighters for the K-1 World Grand Prix Final, along with licensed K-1 Fighting Network events designed to hold national preliminaries for regional qualification.

K-1's popularity differs greatly among six K-1 regions, which may limit the number of actual elimination tournaments or change locations. K-1 attempted to gain popularity in the United States by holding two GPs, however only a few Americans have ever qualified for the Finals. In 2006, one of the American GPs was relocated to Auckland. Additionally the K-1 Paris GP lost its qualifying right in favor of Amsterdam. Eventually, Amsterdam would lose it in favor of Łódź, and then Łódź in favor of Bucharest.

K-1 World Grand Prix Final Eliminator ("Final 16") is an event where 16 participants compete for the final eight spots in the Final ("Final 8"). Eight participants from the Final Eliminator meet at the K-1 World Grand Prix Final. Other elements of the tournament format would be modified over the years. The final was held at Tokyo Dome from 1997 to 2006.

=== K-1 World MAX and others ===
By 2002, K-1 started the K-1 World MAX ("Middleweight Artistic Xtreme") tournament for 70 kg (154 lb) Middleweight division, following a similar scheme to K-1 World Grand Prix (with theoretically four regional eliminators). In 2007, K-1 introduced two new title belts separate from K-1 World GP Champions, Super Heavyweight World Title for fighters over 100 kg/220 lbs and Heavyweight World Title for fighters under 100 kg/156–220 lbs.

== Broadcast ==
K-1 events have been shown on the Tokyo Broadcasting System and Fuji TV during FEG ownership. Following the reformation of K-1 under M-1, events would air through other broadcasters such as GAORA SPORTS, BS Sky PerfecTV! and TV Tokyo.

K-1 events are currently broadcast through streaming service Abema TV domestically in Japan. The promotion regularly uploads full fights, press conferences, and general media to its global YouTube channel.

On August 30, 2023, it was announced that DAZN would begin distributing future K-1 events in 200 countries, beginning with the ReBOOT～K-1 ReBIRTH～ event on September 10. However, the stream would be taken down due to a lawsuit filed by CSI Sports / Fight Sports on August 14, 2023. By Summer 2024, Fight Sports would take over the international broadcast rights to all K-1 events.

Beginning in 2025, K-1 events are distributed outside Japan primarily by Abema's international PPV platform Abema Live.

== List of K-1 champions ==
=== Current K-1 champions ===
Division	Champion	Since	Title defences
Heavyweight (Unlimited)	(Brazil) Ariel Machado	2025	1
Cruiserweight (-90 kg)	(Netherlands) Thian de Vries	2025	0
Middleweight (-75 kg)	(Brazil) Dengue Silva	2026	0
Super Welterweight (-70 kg)	(Brazil) Jonas Salsicha	2026	0
Welterweight (-67.5 kg)	Vacant		0
Super Lightweight (-65 kg)	(Japan) Taio Asahisa	2025	1
Lightweight (-62.5 kg)	(Japan) Kiyomitsu Samuel Nagasawa	2026	0
Super Featherweight (-60 kg)	(Japan) Tomoya Yokoyama	2026	1
Featherweight (-57.5 kg)	(Japan) Rui Okubo	2026	0
Super Bantamweight (-55 kg)	(Japan) Riamu	2026	0
Bantamweight (-53 kg)	(Japan) Neigo Katono	2026	0
Women's Flyweight (-52 kg)	(Japan) SAHO	2024	3
Minimumweight (-48 kg)	Vacant		0
Atomweight (-45 kg)	(Japan) Aki Suematsu	2026	0

== See also ==
- List of K-1 events
- List of K-1 champions
- Krush
- List of male kickboxers
- List of Krush champions
