= W.A.K.O. European Championships 2012 (Bucharest) =

W.A.K.O. European Championships 2012 in Bucharest
- The poster for W.A.K.O. European Championships 2012 in Bucharest
- Promotion: W.A.K.O. F.R.A.M.C.
- Date: 27 November – 1 December
- Venue: Polyvalent Hall
- City: Bucharest, Romania

Event chronology
W.A.K.O. European Championships 2012 (Ankara)	W.A.K.O. European Championships 2012 in Bucharest

W.A.K.O. European Championships 2012 in Bucharest were the joint twenty-three European kickboxing championships held by the W.A.K.O. organization arranged by the Romanian Full-Contact Martial Arts Federation (F.R.A.M.C.) president Dorel Bulearcă. The first event was held the previous month in Ankara, Turkey. It was the first W.A.K.O. event to be held in Bucharest and Romania and involved over 550 amateur men and women from 35 countries across Europe.

There were four styles on offer at Bucharest: Full-Contact, Semi-Contact, Light-Contact and Musical Forms. Only one competitor per weight division were allowed to participate in the first three, while Musical Forms was allowed two maximum per country.

The top nation by the end of the championships was Russia, with Italy in second and Hungary in third. The winners of the Full-Contact and Semi-Contact events qualified for the World Combat Games 2013.

The event was held over five days at the Polyvalent Hall in Bucharest, Romania, starting on Tuesday, 27 November and ending on Saturday, 1 December 2012.

== Full-Contact ==
Full-Contact is a form of kickboxing where the contestants can throw punches and kicks with full power at legal targets above the waist. Victories are usually gained via a point's decision or by referee stoppage and as with most other forms of amateur kickboxing, various head and body protection must be worn.

=== Men's Full-Contact Kickboxing Medals Table ===
Event	Gold	Silver	Bronze
Light Bantamweight -51 kg	Alexey Trifonov (Russia)	Dimitri Shudolschi (Moldova)	Wojciech Peryt (Poland); Çağrı Coşkun (Turkey)
Bantamweight -54 kg	Ilnaz Sayfullin (Russia)	Çağdaş Yıkılmaz (Turkey)	Guillaume Oz-uzun (France); Evgheni Ivanchenco (Moldova)
Featherweight -57 kg	Alexandr Shamray (Russia)	Hüseyin Dündar (Turkey)	Artem Skobchenko (Ukraine); Roberto Pizzagalli (Italy)
Lightweight -60 kg	Vasily Zaytsev (Russia)	Nurettin Diler (Turkey)	Kamel Bacha (France); Damian Lawniczak (Poland)
Light Welterweight -63.5 kg	Sergey Lipinets (Russia)	Gábor Garbics (Hungary)	Saidi William (France); Kostyantin Demoretskyy (Ukraine)
Welterweight -67 kg	Amansio Paraschiv (Romania)	Oleg Zaytcev (Russia)	Piotr Odwazny (Poland); Davyd Ahakhanov (Ukraine)
Light Middleweight -71 kg	Nikita Selyansky (Russia)	Zsolt Benedek (Hungary)	Hallgeir Lien (Norway); Gregor Stračanek (Slovenia)
Middleweight -75 kg	Yusup Magomedbekov (Russia)	Andreas Lodrup (Norway)	Hünkar Kılıç (Turkey); Teo Mikelic (Croatia)
Light Heavyweight -81 kg	Samet Keser (Turkey)	Marian Makaveev (Russia)	Vincent Grác (Slovakia); Mariusz Niziołek (Poland)
Cruiserweight -86 kg	Marco Deckmann (Germany)	Ian Petrovich (Russia)	Cristian Vedovelli (Italy); Roman Hasparian (Ukraine)
Heavyweight -91 kg	Eugen Waigel (Germany)	Alexei Papin (Russia)	Igor Prykhodko (Ukraine); Dănuţ Hurduc (Romania)
Super Heavyweight +91 kg	Emin Panian (Russia)	Hamza Kendircioglu (Turkey)	Ivan Tkachenko (Ukraine); Georgij Fibich (Czech Republic)

=== Women's Full-Contact Kickboxing Medals Table ===
Event	Gold	Silver	Bronze
Bantamweight -48 kg	Valeria Calabrese (Italy)	Rada Akulova (Russia)	Hulya Allkayis (Turkey); Malene Feldt (Denmark)
Featherweight -52 kg	Sandra Drabik (Poland)	Valentina Filatova (Russia)	Funda Tiken (Turkey); Clarissa Oddi (Italy)
Lightweight -56 kg	Tonje Sørlie (Norway)	Dorota Godzina (Poland)	Camilla Wiksten (Finland); Veronika Petrikova (Slovakia)
Middleweight -60 kg	Thea Therese Næss (Norway)	Fatima Bokova (Russia)	Ashley Brace (United Kingdom); Maneka Kissel (Germany)
Light Heavyweight -65 kg	Cathrine Heggøy Fonnes (Norway)	Ksenia Miroshnichenko (Russia)	Nicole Trimmel (Austria); Sema Fatma Okansoy (Turkey)
Heavyweight -70 kg	Nives Radic (Croatia)	Beata Leśnik (Poland)	Lucie Mlejnkova (Czech Republic); Irina Gavrilova (Russia)
Super Heavyweight +70 kg	Anna Gladkikh (Russia)	Eda Sahin (Turkey)	Denitsa Boyanova (Bulgaria); Karolina Dziedzic (Poland)

== Semi-Contact ==
Semi-Contact is the least physical of the contact kickboxing styles available at W.A.K.O. events. It involves the participants throwing controlled strikes at targets above the waist, with point's scored on the basis of speed and technique with power prohibited. Despite the less physical nature all contestants must wear head and various body protection.

=== Men's Semi-Contact Kickboxing Medals Table ===
Event	Gold	Silver	Bronze
-57 kg	Davide Colla (Italy)	László Varga (Hungary)	Vyacheslav Shcherbakov (Russia); Ricardo Kremps (Germany)
-63 kg	Richárd Veres (Hungary)	Adriano Passaro (Italy)	Nick Ramael (Belgium); Dessie Leonard (Republic of Ireland)
-69 kg	Davide Sfulcini (Italy)	Jay Daniels (Republic of Ireland)	Alex Veres (Hungary); Antonio Lo Prete (Italy)
-74 kg	László Gömbös (Hungary)	Mark McDermott (Republic of Ireland)	Phillip Ruckdeschel (Germany); Tilen Zajc (Slovenia)
-79 kg	Tamás Imre (Hungary)	Dean Barry (Republic of Ireland)	Marco Nordio (Italy); Emanuil Dimitrov (Bulgaria)
-84 kg	Robbie McMenamy (Republic of Ireland)	Roman Brandl (Austria)	Neri Stella (Italy); Dmitriy Iakovlev (Russia)
-89 kg	Robert Knaseder (Germany)	Bjorn Van Hoyweghen (Belgium)	David Firth (Republic of Ireland); Marco Bubba (Italy)
-94 kg	Paolo Niceforo (Italy)	Michel Decian (Switzerland)	Primož Bračič (Slovenia); Alexander Federer (Austria)
+94 kg	Krisztian Jaroszkievicz (Hungary)	Chris Aston (United Kingdom)	Philipp Salugin (Russia); Idris Ünver (Turkey)

=== Women's Semi-Contact Kickboxing Medals Table ===
Event	Gold	Silver	Bronze
-50 kg	Giulia Cavallaro (Italy)	Mercédesz Veres (Hungary)	Bo Mangan (Republic of Ireland); Ebru Özmen (Turkey)
-55 kg	Luisa Gullotti (Italy)	Nelly Hanicz (Hungary)	Valeriya Utkina (Russia); Eirin Dale (Norway)
-60 kg	Shauna Bannon (Republic of Ireland)	Gloria De Bei (Italy)	Evelyn Neyens (Belgium); Adrienne Kadas (Hungary)
-65 kg	Caradh O'Donovan (Republic of Ireland)	Ina Grindheim (Norway)	Carlotta Pra (Italy); Andrea Busa (Hungary)
-70 kg	Henrietta Nagy (Hungary)	Amber Makaulauski (Republic of Ireland)	Maria Semenova (Russia); Adelheid Rump (Austria)
+70 kg	Irina Murashova (Russia)	Anna Kondár (Hungary)	Gaynor Morgan (United Kingdom); Diletta Faiola (Italy)

=== Team's Semi-Contact Kickboxing Medals Table ===
Event	Gold	Silver	Bronze
Team	Hungary	Italy	Bulgaria; Great Britain (United Kingdom)

== Light-Contact ==
Light-Contact is a form of kickboxing that is less physical than Full-Contact but more so than Semi-Contact and is often seen as a transition between the two. Contestants score points on the basis of speed and technique over brute force although stoppages can occur, although as with other amateur forms head and body protection must be worn. Unfortunately, it is often in the shadow of the full contact styles.

=== Men's Light-Contact Kickboxing Medals Table ===
Event	Gold	Silver	Bronze
-57 kg	Kacper Narloch (Poland)	Metin Adanç (Turkey)	Norbert Rizmayer (Hungary); Mahmoud Sheikh (Israel)
-63 kg	Aleksandr Bakirov (Russia)	Alex Crotti (Italy)	Matthias Jenni (Switzerland); Maciej Domińczak (Poland)
-69 kg	Rustam Mirzoev (Russia)	Nenad Manojlovski (North Macedonia)	Itay Gershon (Israel); Maciej Garbaczewski (Poland)
-74 kg	László Anda (Hungary)	Dimitar Gjorgiev (North Macedonia)	Alexey Lenberg (Russia); Wojciech Niedzielski (Poland)
-79 kg	Aivar Gafurov (Russia)	Kamila Ruta (Poland)	Andrei Costea (Romania); Salvatore Mangiafico (Italy)
-84 kg	Michał Mączka (Poland)	Willmark Procida (France)	Matej Engler (Slovakia); Ghenadie Bitco (Moldova)
-89 kg	Dejan Vajs]] (Slovenia)	Franz Gruber (Austria)	Bogdan Nicolae Zamfir (Romania); Cyprian Grzęda (Poland)
-94 kg	Viktor Hargitai (Hungary)	Danilo Zaccone (Italy)	Mihail Cârstea (Romania); Patryk Zaborowski (Poland)
+94 kg	Michał Wszelak (Poland)	Peter Bayer (Germany)	Daniel Alexandru (Romania); Artem Vasylenko (Ukraine)

=== Women's Light-Contact Kickboxing Medals Table ===
Event	Gold	Silver	Bronze
-50 kg	Żaneta Cieśla (Poland)	Patricia Pulling (Austria)	Plamena Tsigularova (Bulgaria); Valentina Cabras (Italy)
-55 kg	Nicole Perona (Italy)	Iwona Nieroda (Poland)	Clara Lanuzel (France); Victoria Usachenko (Russia)
-60 kg	Paulina Frankowska (Poland)	Albena Malcheva (Bulgaria)	Adriana Tricoci (Italy); Isabela Kovačič (Slovenia)
-65 kg	Anett Miskolczi (Hungary)	Ambre Lopez (France)	Gordana Cvetkovska (North Macedonia); Lucia Cmarova (Slovakia)
-70 kg	Marta Waliczek (Poland)	Veronika Kohutova (Czech Republic)	Cristina Caruso (Italy); Veronika Kohutova (Slovakia)
+70 kg	Giulia Compagno (Italy)	Denitsa Koleva (Bulgaria)	Kata Boros (Hungary)

== Musical Forms ==
Musical Forms is a type of non-physical competition which sees the contestants fighting against imaginary foes using Martial Arts techniques. Unlike Full, Semi and Light-Contact kickboxing there were no weight divisions, only male and female competitions and competitors were allowed to compete in more than one category with some countries having than one athlete in each category. The men and women at Bucharest competed in four different styles explained below:

- Hard Styles – coming from Karate and Taekwondo.
- Soft Styles – coming from Kung Fu and Wu-Sha.
- Hard Styles with Weapons – using weapons such as Kama, Sai, Tonfa, Nunchaku, Bō, Katana.
- Soft Styles with Weapons - using weapons such as Naginata, Nunchaku, Tai Chi Chuan Sword, Whip Chain.

=== Men's Musical Forms Medals Table ===
Event	Gold	Silver	Bronze
Open Hand - Hard Style	Nikita Tsyganok (Russia)	Denis Gavrilov (Russia)	Alberto Leonardi (Italy)
Open Hand - Soft Style	Ivan Baev (Russia)	Linar Bagautdinov (Russia)	Mihai Ioana (Romania)
Weapons - Hard Style	Roman Chizhov (Russia)	Denis Gavrilov (Russia)	No bronze awarded
Weapons - Soft Style	Ivan Baev (Russia)	Linar Bagautdinov (Russia)	Slavko Majkić (Slovenia)

=== Women's Musical Forms Medals Table ===
Event	Gold	Silver	Bronze
Open Hand - Hard Style	Elena Chirkova (Russia)	Olga Kuskova (Russia)	Kateryna Petenova (Ukraine)
Open Hand - Soft Style	Veronika Dombrovskaya (Belarus)	Ekaterina Tuvaeva (Russia)	Olga Timchenko (Ukraine)
Weapons - Hard Style	Darya Danausova (Ukraine)	Anna Likhonina (Russia)	Elena Chirkova (Russia)
Weapons - Soft Style	Veronika Dombrovskaya (Belarus)	Ekaterina Tuvaeva (Russia)	Darya Masharo (Belarus)

== Medal table ==
Ranking	Country	Gold (gold)	Silver (silver)	Bronze (bronze)
1	Russia	18	15	9
2	Italy	12	6	13
3	Hungary	9	8	7
4	Poland	7	4	11
5	(Republic of Ireland) Ireland	4	5	4
6	Norway	3	2	2
7	Germany	3	0	4
8	Turkey	1	6	7
9	(United Kingdom) Great Britain	1	1	4
10	Belarus	2	0	1
11	Ukraine	1	0	9
12	Romania	1	0	6
13	Slovenia	1	0	5
14	Croatia	1	0	1
15	Austria	0	4	4
16	France	0	3	6
17	Bulgaria	0	3	4
18	Switzerland	0	2	2
19	(North Macedonia) Macedonia	0	2	1
20	Moldova	0	1	2
20	Belgium	0	1	2
20	Czech Republic	0	1	2
23	Slovakia	0	0	5
24	Israel	0	0	2
25	Denmark	0	0	1
25	Finland	0	0	1

== See also ==
- List of WAKO Amateur European Championships
- List of WAKO Amateur World Championships
- List of male kickboxers
- List of female kickboxers
