= Sala Chauncey Hardy =

- Location: Giurgiu, Romania
- Owner: Consiliul Județean Giurgiu

Tenant
- CSȘ Giurgiu

Website
- http://cssgiurgiu.ro/

Sala Chauncey Hardy is an indoor arena in Giurgiu, Romania. Its best known tenant is the men's basketball club CSS Giurgiu.
