= Arnold Oborotov =

Lithuanian kickboxer

- Born: Arnold Oborotov; December 4, 1989 (age 36); Vilnius, Lithuanian SSR, Soviet Union
- Nationality: Lithuanian
- Height: 6 ft 5 in (1.96 m)
- Weight: 232 lb (105 kg; 16.6 st)
- Division: Heavyweight
- Style: Muay Thai
- Stance: Orthodox
- Fighting out of: London, England
- Team: Bloodline Gym
- Trainer: Paul Marut
- Years active: 2008–present

Kickboxing record
- Total: 57
- Wins: 43
- By knockout: 24
- Losses: 13
- By knockout: 6
- Draws: 1

Other information
- Website: http://www.arnoldoborotov.co.uk
- Last updated on: May 29, 2014

Arnold Oborotov (born December 4, 1989) is a Lithuanian kickboxer.

== Career ==
He faced Jarrell Miller at the K-1 World Grand Prix 2012 in Tokyo final 16 on October 14, 2012. Although he was able to land some powerful low kicks on Miller, the American's boxing ability was too much for Oborotov and he lost by unanimous decision after being floored in round one.

He replaced Zabit Samedov to face Andrei Stoica in an elimination fight for a shot at the inaugural SuperKombat Heavyweight (−95 kg/209 lb) Championship at the SuperKombat World Grand Prix 2012 Final in Bucharest, Romania on December 22, 2012. He lost by knock out in the first round, the first KO loss of his career.

He faced Emmanuel Payet for the WKN World Oriental Rules Light Heavyweight Title at Fight Night Saint Tropez in Saint-Tropez, France on August 4, 2013, losing by decision.

He lost to Peter Graham via an extension round majority decision in the semi-finals of a heavyweight tournament at Global FC 3 in Dubai, UAE on May 29, 2014.

He lost to Nicolas Wamba at Fight Night Saint-Tropez II in Saint-Tropez, France on August 4, 2014. Wamba earned a cut above right eye in first round, but defeated Oborotov via a spectacular right head-kick.

In his next fight, during GFC Fight Series 2, Oborotov fought Badr Hari. Hari won the fight by a first-round KO.

== Titles ==
- 2019 KGP World Heavyweight Champion
- 2016 A1 WGP Final Heavyweight Tournament Runner Up
- 2016 A1 WGP Part 2 Heavyweight Tournament Champion
- 2014 ISKA European Heavyweight (−100 kg/-220 lb) K-1 Rules Champion
- 2014 International Heavyweight Tournament +96 kg Champion
- 2011 World Kickboxing Network (W.K.N.) European Oriental Rules Grand Prix Champion
- 2010 UKMF Cruiserweight British Champion
- 2009 UKMF English Champion

== Kickboxing record ==
Kickboxing record
43 Wins (24 (T)KOs, 18 decisions), 13 Losses, 1 Draw
Date	Result	Opponent	Event	Location	Method	Round	Time	Record
2019-07-13	Win	(Poland) Lukasz Krupadziorow	Kickboxing Grand Prix 22	London, England	TKO (referee stoppage)	5		40–15–1
Wins KGP World Heavyweight Title
2018-04-08	Win	(France) Stéphane Susperregui	Fight Night Saint Tropez	Saint-Tropez, France	Decision (unanimous)	3		39–15–1
2018-04-08	Win	(Moldova) Pavel Voronin	Fight Night Saint Tropez	Saint-Tropez, France	TKO	1		38–15–1
2018-02-25	Win	(Belgium) Mathieu Kongolo	K1 Event 11	Troyes, France	KO	2		37–15–1
2018-02-25	Win	(France) Billel Gazout	K1 Event 11	Troyes, France	Decision	3		36–15–1
2017-11-25	Loss	(Slovakia) Martin Pacas	Diamonds Fight Night III	Liptovský Mikuláš, Slovakia	Decision (Unanimous)	5	3:00	35–15–1
For the vacant WKU Muay Thai World Heavyweight title.
2016-10-13	Loss	(Ukraine) Roman Kryklia	Partouche Kickboxing Tour 2016 – Final	France	TKO (Low Kicks)	1		35–14–1
For the A1 WGP Final Heavyweight Tournament.
2016-10-13	Win	(Moldova) Pavel Voronin	Partouche Kickboxing Tour 2016 – Semi Finals	France	Decision	3	3:00	35–13–1
2016-07-02	Win	(Turkey) Gokhan Gedik	Respect World Series 2: Clash of the Titans	London, England	Decision (split)	3		34–13–1
2016-05-21	Win	(Belgium) Yannick Vest	Partouche Kickboxing Tour 2016 – Etape 2	Saint-Amand-les-Eaux	TKO (knees to the head)	3		33–12–1
Wins A1 WGP Part 2 Heavyweight Tournament.
2016-05-21	Win	(France) Bengaly Kieta	Partouche Kickboxing Tour 2016 – Etape 2	Saint-Amand-les-Eaux	KO (left body hook)	3		32–11–1
2015-12-07	Win	(France) Emmanuel Payet	KO Blood & Glory 6	London, England	Decision	3	3:00	31–11–1
2015-02-21	Loss	(France) Pacôme Assi	K-1 Events 7, Semi Finals	Troyes, France	KO	3		30–11–1
2014-11-16	Win	(Sweden) Simon Ogolla	Blood & Glory 4	London, England	Decision	3		30–10–1
Wins ISKA European Heavyweight (−100 kg/-220 lb) K-1 Rules Championship.
2014-10-16	Loss	(Morocco) Badr Hari	GFC Fight Series 2	Dubai, UAE	KO (Right body shot)	1		29–10–1
2014-08-04	Loss	(France) Nicolas Wamba	Fight Night Saint-Tropez II	Saint-Tropez, France	KO (right high kick)	2		29–9–1
2014-06-29	Loss	(Belarus) Andrei Gerasimchuk	Kunlun Fight 6, Semi Finals	Chongqing, China	KO			29–8–1
2014-05-29	Loss	(Australia) Peter Graham	GFC Fight Series 1 – Heavyweight Tournament, Semi Finals	Dubai, UAE	Ext. r. decision (majority)	3	3:00	29–7–1
2014-02-22	Win	(France) Daniel Lentie	K1 Events 6	Troyes, France	TKO (Retirement)	2	0:00	29–6–1
Wins K1 Events 6l Heavyweight Tournament +96 kg.
2014-02-22	Win	(Spain) Jaime Gomez Pastor	K1 Events 6	Troyes, France	KO (Punches)	2		28–6–1
2013-11-02	Win	(England) Mickey Terrill	KO Blood & Glory 3	London, England	Decision	3	3:00	27–6–1
2013-08-04	Loss	(France) Emmanuel Payet	Fight Night in France	Saint Tropez, France	Decision	5	2:00	26–6–1
For WKN World Oriental Rules Light Heavyweight Title −96 kg.
2013-05-18	Win	(France) Nordine Mahieddine	URBAN BOXING UNITED 2013	France	KO (Knee)	2		26–5–1
2012-12-22	Loss	(Romania) Andrei Stoica	SuperKombat World Grand Prix 2012 Final	Bucharest, Romania	KO (punches)	1		25–5–1
SuperKombat Heavyweight (−95kg/209lb) Title eliminator.
2012-10-14	Loss	(United States) Jarrell Miller	K-1 World Grand Prix 2012 in Tokyo final 16, First Round	Tokyo, Japan	Decision (unanimous)	3	3:00	25–4–1
2012-04-28	Draw	(France) Jérôme Le Banner	Le Banner Series Acte 1	Geneva, Switzerland	Decision draw	5	2:00	25–3–1
Fight was for W.K.N. Kickboxing OR World Super Heavyweight title (+96 kg).
2012-04-07	Win	(France) Farid El Farsi	Explosion Fight Night Vol.5	Châteauroux, France	TKO (Corner stoppage)	1	1:57	
2011-11-12	Win	(Netherlands) Revanho Blockland	O2 Xplosion	England	TKO (3 knockdowns)	1	3:00	
2011-10-15	Loss	(France) Stéphane Susperregui	Le Choc des Titans II	Graulhet, France	Decision	3	3:00	
2011-06-18	Win	(Spain) Antonio De La Orden	Carcharias 2011, WKN Tournament, Final	Perpignan, France	TKO (kick to the body)	1	1:03	
Wins W.K.N. European Oriental Rules Grand Prix title.
2011-06-18	Win	(Cameroon) David Boyomo	Carcharias 2011, WKN Tournament, Semi Final	Perpignan, France	Decision	3	2:00	
2011-03-06	Win	(France) Corentin Jallon	KO Bloodline Show	London, England	KO	1		
2011-02-14	Loss	(Morocco) Mohamed Boubkari	Enfusion 2011 : Inside Out	Ko Samui, Thailand	Decision	3	3:00	
2010-09-25	Win	(Scotland) Dave McMahon	International Muay Thai	London, England	TKO (2 knockdowns)	1		
Wins UKMF Cruiserweight British title.
2010-04-25	Win	(England) Lyndon Knowles	Muay Thai Addicts 3	London, England	Decision (Unanimous)	5	2:00	
2010-03-20	Loss	(Czech Republic) Ondrej Hutnik	Gala Night Thaiboxing	Žilina, Slovakia	Decision (Unanimous)	3		
2009-12-13	Win	(Lithuania) Arunas Andriuskevicius	Muaythai Addicts 2	London, England	Decision (Unanimous)	5	2:00	
2009-12-13	Win	(England) Chris Wray	Muaythai Addicts 2	London, England	KO (Punches)	1		
2009-12-13	Win	(England) Chris Guyll	Muaythai Addicts 2	London, England	KO (Right cross)	1		
2009-09-13	Win	(Russia) Maxim Osipsov	Muaythai Addicts 2	London, England	Decision (Unanimous)	5	3:00	
Wins UKMF English title.
2009-09-01	Win	(England) Joe Colville	Muaythai Legends	London, England	TKO (Corner stoppage)	1	2:00	
2009-05-31	Win	(Guyana) Litu	Muaythai Addicts 1	London, England	Decision (Unanimous)	2	5:00	
Legend: Win Loss Draw/No contest Notes
