= Rodney Glunder =

Dutch professional wrestler, kickboxer and mixed martial artist

- Born: Rodney Faverus; January 3, 1975 (age 51); Leiden, Netherlands
- Other names: The Silent Assassin
- Height: 6 ft 0 in (1.83 m)
- Weight: 234 lb (106 kg; 16.7 st)
- Division: Light Heavyweight (1996–2002; 2004–2009); Heavyweight (2002–2004; 2009–2013; 2014–2017)
- Reach: 76 in (193 cm)
- Style: MMA, kickboxing, boxing, wrestling, Kyokushin karate, Taekwondo, Brazilian jiu-jitsu
- Stance: Orthodox
- Fighting out of: Amsterdam, Netherlands
- Team: Team Hardcore (1995–1999); Mike's Gym (2009–present); Mejiro Gym (1999–2008); Team Benelux (2008); Gracie Barra Amsterdam (2011–2013); Burning Heart Dojo (2009–present)
- Trainer: Danny van Bergen; Remco Pardoel; Lucien Carbin; Andre Mannaart; Mike Passenier; Bob Schrijber; Jan Plas (1999–2008)
- Rank: black belt in Kyokushin black belt in Taekwondo blue belt in Brazilian Jiu-Jitsu
- Years active: 1995–2013; 2014–2017

Professional boxing record
- Total: 1
- Wins: 1
- By knockout: 1
- Losses: 0

Kickboxing record
- Total: 29
- Wins: 17
- By knockout: 5
- Losses: 12
- By knockout: 4

Mixed martial arts record
- Total: 49
- Wins: 25
- By knockout: 12
- By submission: 3
- By decision: 9
- By disqualification: 1
- Losses: 20
- By knockout: 3
- By submission: 11
- By decision: 6
- Draws: 3
- No contests: 1

Other information
- Mixed martial arts record from Sherdog
- Sponsored by Diesel (2003–2010). Last updated on: June 12, 2012

Rodney Glunder (born as Rodney Faverus, March 1, 1975) is a retired Dutch professional kickboxer, mixed martial artist, professional wrestler and boxer, current actor, entrepreneur, bodybuilder and convicted rapist. He has fought for M-1 Global, Cage Rage, K-1, PRIDE Fighting Championship, RINGS, Glory, Konfrontacja Sztuk Walki, It's Showtime, SuperKombat, SLAMM!! Events and Art of War Fighting Championship. Glunder holds notable wins over top contenders Cheick Kongo, Valentijn Overeem, Joe Riggs, Melvin Manhoef, Cyrille Diabaté, Brian Douwes and Gregory Tony.

In March 2022 Glunder was charged with rape, aggravated assault and attempted manslaughter by the Dutch authorities.

On March 25, 2022, he was found guilty of four counts of rape, three counts of aggravated assault and attempted manslaughter. He has been sentenced to 5 years in prison, which was increased to 7 years in appeal.

== Mixed martial arts and kickboxing career ==
Glunder began practicing martial arts at the age of 18, with Kyokushin kaikan and Taekwondo. He has a son who fights as a professional kickboxer, Massaro Glunder (born in 1994). In 1997, he won the European full contact karate championships. Rodney began competing in mixed martial arts in 1996, and is a journeyman of the sport with almost fifty fights. Rodney has never been knocked out in professional kickboxing, in late-2014 Glunder was knocked out with a knee to the body in a kickboxing bout, but has been knocked out only once in professional mixed martial arts competition by former UFC contender and fellow Dutch fighter Gilbert Yvel who knocked Glunder unconscious with a series of punches at 2 Hot 2 Handle: Pride and Honor in 2006. Glunder is also the first person to ever defeat veterans Brian Douwes and Mikko Rupponen by technical knockout.

In April 2003, Rodney made his K-1 debut against former UFC and Strikeforce contender Joe Riggs at the K-1 Holland Grand Prix 2003 and won via knockout within the first round. He won his first K-1 GP in June 2006, when he defeated three opponents in one night to be crowned the K-1 Canarias 2006 champion.

In May 2012, Glunder entered the SuperKombat World GP to accept a fight against Romanian kickboxer Andrei Stoica after Stoica referred to Glunder's sparring partner and fellow Surinamese fighter Redouan Cairo as "the nigger" in a post fight interview after Stoica's recent fight with Cairo. Glunder later lost the fight via decision in a fight many believe Glunder had won, after the fight Glunder went on to say he felt he lost the fight due to Stoica being the "poster boy" for SuperKombat and Romanian judges biased toward Surinamese fighters.

Rodney replaced injured K-1 legend Jérôme Le Banner against Marcin Różalski at KSW 20, losing the fight via unanimous decision.

On April 20, 2013, at the Rumble of the North II event Glunder fought his last career fight, this time under boxing rules. He defeated Janos Tiborcz by first-round KO and retired from contact sports shortly after.

On May 31, 2014, Rodney has decided to come out of retirement to take a fight against Porud Gym fighter Koos Wessels Boer for the vacant M.O.N Muay Thai European Championship at Rumble of the North IV.

== Professional wrestling career ==
Rodney Glunder
Personal information
- Born: Rodney Faverus; January 3, 1975 (age 51) Leiden, Netherlands

Professional wrestling career
- Ring name: Rodney Glunder
- Billed height: 6 ft 1 in (1.85 m)
- Billed weight: 250 lb (110 kg; 18 st)
- Billed from: South Holland, Netherlands
- Trained by: Bas van Kunder wXw staff Dutch Top Team
- Debut: August 5, 2005

After retiring from fighting Glunder has decided to once again pursue a career in professional wrestling, Rodney was previously the owner of New Blood Wrestling in Jan 2004, the promotion folded a year later near the end of 2005, and also occasionally wrestled for German promotion Westside Xtreme Wrestling and Pro Wrestling Holland after his promotion folded. On June 22, 2013, Glunder is set to make his return to wrestling at a Pro Wrestling Showdown event in a tag team match, teaming with former WWE competitor Joe E. Legend after Legend's partner Sean Lucas suffered an injury during training. After winning this match with Legend he later joined the Red Star Empire stable alongside Rico Bushido and Adam Polak, replacing Red Star member Lloyd Pengel after Pengel cost the team to lose a number of previous matches. Pengel was later allowed back into the Red Star Empire after suffering a beating at the hands of Glunder and Bushido.

After a couple weeks of inactivity Glunder returned with his Red Star team to challenge WWE Hall of Fame inductee Tony Atlas to a match after Glunder told Atlas he is a better bodybuilder than Atlas ever was, Glunder recently started bodybuilding in 2013 and Atlas is a 30-year bodybuilding veteran, Glunder also went on to say he wanted the match to be a no holds barred match, Atlas later accepted the match and is set to take place at the PWS 13 event on February 23, 2014, in Purmerend, Netherlands. The match was declared a no-contest by the referee when Glunder refused to release his guillotine choke submission after Atlas fell unconscious as he grabbed the ring ropes, Glunder was later suspended by PWS executives for several months. A year after his suspension ended Rodney made sporadic appearances on the Holland independent circuit, Glunder later decided to re-retire from professional wrestling in March 2016 to pursue a career in acting, specifically in direct to TV films in the Netherlands.

== Titles and championships ==
- CFC World Heavyweight Champion (one time, last)
- ISKA Cruiserweight (86–95 kg) Champion (one time)
- IKBO World Heavyweight Champion (one time)
- 2006 K-1 Canarias GP Champion
- IMA Mix Fight World Champion (one time)
- RINGS Intercontinental Champion (two times)
- IMA Mix Fight European Champion (one time)
- 2003 RINGS Durata GP Champion
- RINGS Free Fight Dutch Champion (three times, last)
- 2000 Mix Fight European Champion
- 1997 Full Contact Karate European Champion

== Mixed martial arts record ==
Professional record breakdown
49 matches	25 wins	20 losses
By knockout	12	2
By submission	3	12
By decision	9	6
By disqualification	1	0
Draws	3	
No contests	1	

Res.	Record	Opponent	Method	Event	Date	Round	Time	Location	Notes
Loss	25–20–3 (1)	Marcin Rózalski	Decision (unanimous)	KSW 20	September 15, 2012	3	5:00	Gdańsk, Poland	
Loss	25–19–3 (1)	Dion Staring	Technical submission (kimura)	Glory 11	October 17, 2009	1	2:42	Amsterdam, Netherlands	
NC	25–18–3 (1)	Antônio Braga Neto	No Contest (fighter fell from ring)	Art of War 14	September 26, 2009	1	0:24	Macau, China	
Win	25–18–3	Arnoldas Joknys	TKO (punches and elbows)	Cage Fighters Championships 5	March 7, 2009	1	2:42	Riga, Latvia	Wins CFC Heavyweight Championship
Loss	24–18–3	Victor Valimaki	Submission (rear naked choke)	M-1 Challenge 10: Finland	November 26, 2008	1	2:14	Helsinki, Finland	
Loss	24–17–3	James Zikic	Submission (armbar)	Cage Rage 26	May 10, 2008	3	0:25	London, England	
Loss	24–16–3	Robert Jocz	Decision (split)	Beast of the East	January 26, 2008	3	5:00	Amsterdam, Netherlands	
Loss	24–15–3	Krzysztof Kulak	Submission (injury)	Return of the King 2	December 26, 2007	3	N/A	Paramaribo, Suriname	
Loss	24–14–3	Renato Sobral	Technical submission (arm-triangle choke)	PFP: Ring of Fire	December 9, 2007	3	1:00	Quezon City, Philippines	
Loss	24–13–3	Maro Perak	TKO (injury)	WFC 3: Bad Sunday	November 18, 2007	1	5:00	Domžale, Slovenia	For WFC Heavyweight Championship
Win	24–12–3	Chinto Mordillo	KO (punches)	Return of the King 1	August 26, 2007	1	0:08	Paramaribo, Suriname	
Loss	23–12–3	Gilbert Yvel	KO (punches)	2H2H – Pride & Honor	November 12, 2006	1	1:38	Rotterdam, Netherlands	
Win	23–11–3	Mikko Rupponen	TKO (broken hand)	WFC 2: Evolution	September 30, 2006	2	0:22	Koper, Slovenia	
Loss	22–11–3	Yuki Sasaki	Submission (armbar)	WCFC: No Guts No Glory	March 18, 2006	1	4:40	Manchester, England	
Win	22–10–3	Henriques Zowa	Decision	It's Showtime: Amsterdam Arena	June 12, 2005	N/A	N/A	Amsterdam, Netherlands	
Loss	21–10–3	Ramazan Akhadullaev	Decision (split)	M-1 MFC: Heavyweight GP	December 4, 2004	2	5:00	Moscow, Russia	
Loss	21–9–3	Alistair Overeem	Submission (guillotine choke)	2 Hot 2 Handle	October 10, 2004	1	N/A	Rotterdam, Netherlands	For vacant 2H2H Light Heavyweight Championship
Win	21–8–3	Melvin Manhoef	KO (punches)	It's Showtime 2004 Amsterdam	May 20, 2004	2	4:43	Amsterdam, Netherlands	
Win	20–8–3	Dave Vader	Decision (unanimous)	Rings Holland: World's Greatest	April 4, 2004	3	5:00	Utrecht, Netherlands	Wins RINGS Free Fight Dutch Championship
Win	19–8–3	Cyrille Diabaté	Decision (unanimous)	2 Hot 2 Handle	February 22, 2004	2	5:00	Amsterdam, Netherlands	
Loss	18–8–3	Chalid Arrab	Decision (unanimous)	PRIDE Bushido 1	October 5, 2003	2	5:00	Saitama, Japan	
Win	18–7–3	Miodrag Petkovic	TKO (punches)	RINGS Durata World Grand Prix 2	August 10, 2003	1	0:11	Opatija, Croatia	Wins Durata World Grand Prix
Win	17–7–3	Nikolai Onikienko	Decision	RINGS Durata World Grand Prix 2	August 10, 2003	1	5:00	Opatija, Croatia	
Win	16–7–3	Jose Ramalho	Decision	RINGS Durata World Grand Prix 2	August 10, 2003	1	5:00	Opatija, Croatia	
Win	15–7–3	Sergey Kaznovsky	Submission (armbar)	It's Showtime 2003 Amsterdam	June 8, 2003	1	3:41	Amsterdam, Netherlands	
Win	14–7–3	Tommy Sauer	TKO (doctor stoppage)	Rings Holland: One Moment In Time	December 1, 2002	2	3:52	Utrecht, Netherlands	Wins RINGS Free Fight Dutch Championship
Win	13–7–3	Valentijn Overeem	Submission (forfeit)	2H2H 5 – Simply the Best 5	October 13, 2002	1	3:00	Rotterdam, Netherlands	
Win	12–7–3	Cheick Kongo	Decision (unanimous)	Rings Holland: Saved by the Bell	June 2, 2002	2	5:00	Amsterdam, Netherlands	Wins RINGS Intercontinental Championship
Loss	11–7–3	Martin Malkhasyan	Submission (kneebar)	M-1 MFC – Russia vs. the World 3	April 26, 2002	1	3:34	Saint Petersburg, Russia	
Win	11–6–3	Fatih Kocamis	Decision (split)	2H2H 4 – Simply the Best 4	March 17, 2002	2	5:00	Rotterdam, Netherlands	
Win	10–6–3	Paul Cahoon	TKO (doctor stoppage)	Rings Holland: Some Like It Hard	December 2, 2001	3	1:53	Utrecht, Netherlands	Wins RINGS Free Fight Dutch Championship
Draw	9–6–3	Cyrille Diabaté	Draw	Rings Holland: No Guts, No Glory	June 10, 2001	2	5:00	Amsterdam, Netherlands	
Win	9–6–2	Ricardo Fyeet	Submission (guillotine choke)	Rings Holland: Heroes Live Forever	January 28, 2001	2	1:04	Utrecht, Netherlands	Wins RINGS Intercontinental Championship
Win	8–6–2	Fabrice Bernardin	DQ (illegal strikes)	Kam Lung – Only the Strongest Survive 2	November 18, 2000	1	N/A	Hellevoetsluis, Netherlands	
Win	7–6–2	Tjerk Vermanen	TKO (spinning back kick)	It's Showtime – Exclusive	October 22, 2000	1	0:47	Haarlem, Netherlands	
Win	6–6–2	Iwan de Groot	TKO (knees)	Together Productions – Fight Gala	April 15, 2000	1	N/A	Zaandam, Netherlands	
Loss	5–6–2	Jose Landi-Jons	Technical submission (armbar)	Amsterdam Absolute Championship 2	November 27, 1999	1	6:25	Amsterdam, Netherlands	
Loss	5–5–2	Alexandre Ferreira	TKO (submission to punches)	World Vale Tudo Championship 8	July 1, 1999	1	1:59	Aruba	
Win	5–4–2	Silvio Zimmerman	TKO (strikes)	World Vale Tudo Championship 8	July 1, 1999	1	5:07	Aruba	
Draw	4–4–2	Melvin Manhoef	Draw	Rings Holland: The Kings of the Magic Ring	June 20, 1999	2	5:00	Utrecht, Netherlands	
Loss	4–4–1	Sergei Belov	Submission (armbar)	IAFC – Pankration World Championship 1999	May 1, 1999	1	7:55	Moscow, Russia	
Loss	4–3–1	Michele Verginelli	Submission (rear naked choke)	Ultimate Fights Brescia	April 10, 1999	1	11:29	Brescia, Italy	
Loss	4–2–1	Richard Plug	Decision (1-0 points)	FFH – Free Fight Gala	January 9, 1999	N/A	N/A	Beverwijk, Netherlands	
Win	4–1–1	Tomas Valatkevicius	Decision	KO Power Tournament	April 12, 1998	1	10:00	Amsterdam, Netherlands	
Win	3–1–1	Sergei Zavadsky	TKO (punches)	M-1 MFC – World Championship 1998	February 14, 1998	1	0:35	Saint Petersburg, Russia	
Draw	2–1–1	Habib Ben Sallah	Draw	FFH – Free Fight Gala	December 21, 1997	1	5:00	Beverwijk, Netherlands	
Loss	2–1	Sergei Bytchkov	Decision	M-1 MFC – World Championship 1997	November 1, 1997	1	10:00	Saint Petersburg, Russia	
Win	2–0	Rik de Jager	KO (knee to the body)	Rings Holland – Utrecht at War	June 29, 1997	2	1:10	Utrecht, Netherlands	
Win	1–0	Piet Bernzen	Decision	Fight Gala – Mix Fight Night	June 15, 1996	3	5:00	Haarlem, Netherlands	

== Kickboxing record ==
Kickboxing record
Date	Result	Opponent	Method	Round	Time	Event	Location
2017-04-23	Win	(Netherlands) Dennis Stolzenbach	Decision (unanimous)	3	3:00	WLF – Champion vs. Champion	Almere, Netherlands
2012-12-08	Loss	(Cape Verde) Luis Tavares	KO	4	N/A	Kickboks Gala Margriethal	Schiedam, Netherlands
Fight was for IRO European Muay Thai Championship
2012-05-12	Loss	(Romania) Andrei Stoica	Decision (unanimous)	3	3:00	SuperKombat World Grand Prix II 2012	Cluj-Napoca, Romania
2012-02-12	Loss	(Turkey) Ali Cenik	Decision (unanimous)	3	3:00	Natural Powers	Eindhoven, Netherlands
2011-10-30	Loss	(Netherlands) Fred Sikking	Decision (split)	3	3:00	Twilight's Fight Night	Hilversum, Netherlands
2011-10-08	Loss	(Spain) Loren	Decision (split)	3	3:00	Top Event	Tenerife, Spain
2011-05-01	Loss	(Morocco) Mohammed Boubkari	Decision (unanimous)	5	3:00	The Next Generation Warriors 5	Utrecht, Netherlands
Fight was for WFCA Kickboxing Dutch Heavyweight Championship
2011-04-10	Win	(Netherlands) Brian Douwes	TKO (broken arm)	1	3:00	There's Nothing Wrong By Being Strong	Aalsmeer, Netherlands
2011-02-20	Loss	(Croatia) Ivan Stanić	Decision (unanimous)	5	3:00	Opatija Fight Night 3	Opatija, Croatia
Fight was for the KOTR Cruiserweight title
2010-07-04	Loss	(Turkey) Ilkay Altinkaya	Decision	3	3:00	Slamm!! Last fight before Summer	
2010-04-30	Win	(Netherlands) Bas van de Muizenberg	Decision (unanimous)	3	3:00	SLAMM! Events: Powerzone	Amsterdam, Netherlands
2010-03-19	Loss	(Azerbaijan) Zabit Samedov	TKO	3	1:48	K-1 World MAX 2010 East Europe Tournament	Minsk, Belarus
2010-01-30	Win	(Poland) Tomasz Sarara	Decision (unanimous)	3	3:00	Beast of the East	Zutphen, Netherlands
2009-08-29	Loss	(Czech Republic) Ondřej Hutník	Decision	3	3:00	It's Showtime 2009 Budapest	Budapest, Hungary
2009-04-11	Win	(Aruba) Marcello Adriaansz	Decision	3	3:00	Amsterdam Fight Club 5	Amsterdam, Netherlands
2008-11-08	Loss	(Germany) Stefan Leko	Decision (unanimous)	3	3:00	Ultimate Glory 10 "The Battle of Arnhem"	Arnhem, Netherlands
2008-05-07	Loss	(Brazil) Anderson Silva	Decision (unanimous)	3	3:00	Amsterdam Fight Club 3	Amsterdam, Netherlands
2007-10-14	Loss	(Curaçao) Errol Zimmerman	Decision	5	3:00	The Battle of Arnhem 6	Arnhem, Netherlands
2007-01-05	Win	(Russia) Anton Berdinikov	Decision (unanimous)	12	2:00	M-1 Global	Murmansk, Russia
Wins ISKA World Cruiserweight title
2006-11-25	Win	(Morocco) Moustafa Lakhsem	Decision (unanimous)	3	3:00	Beatdown Amsterdam	Amsterdam, Netherlands
2006-06-17	Win	(France) Gregory Tony	TKO (knees and punches)	1	N/A	K-1 Canarias 2006, Final	Santa Cruz de Tenerife, Spain
Wins K-1 Canarias 2006 tournament title
2006-06-17	Win	(Portugal) Humberto Évora	Decision	3	3:00	K-1 Canarias 2006, Semi finals	Santa Cruz de Tenerife, Spain
2006-06-17	Win	(Spain) Alejandro Navarro-Martins	Decision	3	3:00	K-1 Canarias 2006, Quarter finals	Santa Cruz de Tenerife, Spain
2006-06-03	Win	(Curaçao) Errol Paris	TKO (doctor stoppage)	5	1:03	Gentlemen Fight Night 3	Tilburg, Netherlands
2006-05-13	Win	(United States) Jon Delgado	Decision (majority)	3	3:00	K-1 World Grand Prix 2006 in Amsterdam	Amsterdam, Netherlands
2005-12-17	Win	(Morocco) Yussuf Belmikdan	KO (right hook)	4	N/A	2H2H: Road to Japan	Maastricht, Netherlands
2005-10-29	Loss	(Germany) James Phillips	Decision (unanimous)	3	3:00	K-1 New Talents 2005 in Germany	Koblenz, Germany
2005-10-06	Win	(Japan) Tsuyoshi Tajima	TKO (doctor stoppage)	1	3:00	Bushido Europe: Rotterdam Rumble	Rotterdam, Netherlands
2005-06-12	Win	(Angola) Henriques Zowa	Decision (split)	3	3:00	It's Showtime 2005 Amsterdam	Amsterdam, Netherlands
2001-04-22	Win	(Netherlands) Peter Verschuuren	KO (knee)	1	2:06	Millennium Sports 1: Veni Vidi Vici	Veenendaal, Netherlands
Wins IKBO Kickboxing World Heavyweight Championship
1996-10-26	Loss	(Netherlands) Perry Ubeda	TKO (exhaustion)	6	3:00	Battle of Styles	Amsterdam, Netherlands
Fight was for the WKA Kickboxing Dutch Super middleweight title.

== Boxing record ==
Boxing record
1 Wins (1 (T)KOs)
Date	Result	Opponent	Event	Location	Method	Round	Time
2013-04-20	Win	(Czech Republic) Janos Tiborcz	Rumble of the North 2	Uithuizen, Netherlands	KO (punches)	1	1:41
Legend: Win Loss Draw/no contest Notes

== Entrance music ==
Event	Entrance music
Rumble of the North 2	Karate Chop – Future
Natural Powers	Im Boomin – Soulja Boy
SuperKombat World Grand Prix 2012	B.M.F – Rick Ross
There's Nothing Wrong By Being Strong	When Im Gone – Wiz Khalifa
Opatija Fight Night 3	Aston Martin Music – Rick Ross
Cage Fighters Championships 5	Everybody Looking – Gucci Mane
Amsterdam Fight Club 5	My Shadow – Gucci Mane
K-1 World Grand Prix 2006 in Amsterdam	King Of My World – Saliva
2H2H: Road to Japan	You Know How We Do It – Ice Cube

== See also ==
- List of K-1 events
- List of K-1 champions
- List of male kickboxers
- List of male mixed martial artists
- List of male boxers
