= Brice Guidon =

French Muay Thai kickboxer (born 1985)

- Born: July 16, 1985 (age 41); Tours, France
- Other names: Nectar
- Nationality: French
- Height: 1.98 m (6 ft 6 in)
- Weight: 108.4 kg (239 lb; 17.07 st)
- Division: Heavyweight
- Style: Kickboxing, Muay Thai, Savate
- Fighting out of: Amsterdam, Netherlands
- Team: Le Banner Xtream Team; Mejiro Gym; Nectar Boxing Camp
- Trainer: Andre Mannaart
- Years active: 2004–2017

Kickboxing record
- Total: 44
- Wins: 30
- By knockout: 15
- Losses: 14
- By knockout: 10

Other information
- Website: http://www.briceguidon.com/
- Last updated on: December 14, 2015

Brice Guidon (born July 16, 1985), also known as Nectar, is a French Muay Thai kickboxer. He is the W.P.M.F. European Heavyweight and World Super Heavyweight Muaythai Champion, and the 2011 United Glory World Series runner-up. He has competed in the GLORY, K-1, It's Showtime and SUPERKOMBAT promotions.

== Biography and career ==
Brice Guidon was born on 16 July 1985. He started practicing boxing at the age of 9. He had his first professional fight at the age of 21. Guidon resides and trains at Nectar Boxing Camp in Tours, France and trains at Mejiro Gym, Amsterdam.

He rematched Schilt at the opening stage of the sixteen-man 2012 Glory Heavyweight Grand Slam at Glory 4: Tokyo - 2012 Heavyweight Grand Slam in Saitama, Japan on December 31, 2012. Schilt was much more dominant this time, flooring Guidon with a left jab in the opening seconds of round two before finishing him with the same technique soon after. Schilt would then go on to beat three more opponents that night to win the tournament.

He was knocked out by Daniel Ghiță in round one at Glory 9: New York - 2013 95kg Slam in New York City on June 22, 2013.

Guidon lost to Jahfarr Wilnis by KO at Glory 10: Los Angeles - Middleweight World Championship Tournament in Ontario, California, United States on September 28, 2013.

His release from Glory was reported in February 2014, having gone 0-3 with three knockout losses in the promotion.

He lost to Raul Cătinaș at the SUPERKOMBAT World Grand Prix I 2014 in Reșița, Romania on April 12, 2014, receiving three counts from referee Cezar Gheorghe, before being stopped in round two.

== Titles ==
- World Pro League
  - 2012 World Pro League Super Heavyweight Kickboxing K1 champion (+91 kg)
- United Glory
  - 2011 United Glory World Series runner up
- World Professional Muaythai Federation
  - 2010 W.P.M.F. World Super Heavyweight Muaythai champion
  - 2010 W.P.M.F. European Heavyweight Muaythai champion (+91 kg)
- K-1
  - 2009 K-1 World Grand Prix in Tokyo Final 16 Qualifying GP 3rd place
  - 2006 K-1 Fighting Network in Marseilles runner up (100 kg)
- Rising Sun
  - 2005 Rising Sun 5 in Beilen tournament champion
- Others
  - 2003 Junior French Championship (-91 kg)
  - 2002 Cadet French Championship (-86 kg)

== Kickboxing record ==
Kickboxing record
30 wins (15 (T)KOs), 14 losses
Date	Result	Opponent	Event	Location	Method	Round	Time
2018-08-16	Loss	(Azerbaijan) Zabit Samedov	Akhmat Fight Show	Grozny, Russia	Decision (unanimous)	3	3:00
2017-03-18	Loss	(France) Ciryl Gane	La Nuit Des Titans	Tours, France	TKO	3	
2015-12-12	Win	(Italy) Luca Panto	Les Princes du Ring	Tours, France	TKO (referee stoppage)	2	
2015-10-10	Loss	(Netherlands) Dexter Suisse	Enfusion Live 32	Ghent, Belgium	TKO	3	2:44
2015-04-04	Loss	(Morocco) Hicham Achalhi	Enfusion Live 26	The Hague, Netherlands	TKO	2	
2014-09-23	Loss	(Suriname) Ashwin Balrak	Enfusion 5: Victory of the Vixen, Semi Finals	Koh Samui, Thailand	Decision	3	3:00
2014-04-12	Loss	(Romania) Raul Cătinaș	SUPERKOMBAT World Grand Prix I 2014	Reșița, Romania	TKO (punches)	2	1:05
2014-02-01	Win	(Belgium) Thomas Vanneste	Explosion Fight Night 9	Châteauroux, France	TKO	1	
2013-09-28	Loss	(Netherlands) Jahfarr Wilnis	Glory 10: Los Angeles	Ontario, California, USA	KO (right hook)	2	0:38
2013-06-22	Loss	(Romania) Daniel Ghiță	Glory 9: New York	New York City, New York, USA	KO (left hook)	1	0:49
2012-12-31	Loss	(Netherlands) Semmy Schilt	Glory 4: Tokyo - Heavyweight Grand Slam Tournament, First Round	Saitama, Japan	KO (left jab)	2	0:55
2012-03-23	Loss	(Netherlands) Semmy Schilt	United Glory 15	Moscow, Russia	Decision (unanimous)	3	3:00
2012-02-18	Win	(Belarus) Yauhen Makarau	K-1 Event 3	Troyes, France	TKO (referee stoppage)	1	
Wins World Pro League Super Heavyweight Kickboxing K1 title (+91 kg).
2011-11-19	Win	(France) Zinedine Hameur-Lain	Time Fight	Tours, France	Decision (unanimous)	3	3:00
2011-05-28	Loss	(Turkey) Gokhan Saki	United Glory 14: 2010-2011 World Series Finals, Final	Moscow, Russia	Decision (unanimous)	3	3:00
Fight was for United Glory 2010-2011 World Series tournament title.
2011-03-19	Win	(Netherlands) Mourad Bouzidi	United Glory 13: 2010-2011 World Series Semi Finals, Semi Finals	Charleroi, Belgium	TKO (right hook)	2	1:39
2010-12-04	Win	(Canada) Tomas Novack	Thailand King's Birthday	Bangkok, Thailand	KO	3	
Wins WPMF World Super Heavyweight Muaythai title.
2010-10-16	Win	(Belgium) Filip Verlinden	United Glory 12: 2010-2011 World Series Quarter Finals, Quarter Finals	Amsterdam, Netherlands	Decision (unanimous)	3	3:00
2010-07-23	Win	(Spain) Frank Muñoz	Muay Thai France vs Thailand	Stade de l'Est, Réunion	Decision (split)	5	3:00
Retain WPMF European Heavyweight Muaythai title (+91 kg).
2010-04-30	Win	(Germany) Martin Jahn	Urban Boxing United	Marseilles, France	KO	4	
Retain WPMF European Heavyweight Muaythai title (+91 kg).
2010-03-13	Win	(Netherlands) Hesdy Gerges	Oktagon presents: It's Showtime 2010	Milan, Italy	Ext R. decision	4	3:00
2010-02-06	Win	(England) Chris Knowles	UKC France MAX 2010	Dijon, France	TKO (elbow)	1	
Wins WPMF European Heavyweight Muaythai title (+91 kg).
2009-11-21	Win	(Tunisia) Mourad Bouzidi	It's Showtime 2009 Barneveld	Barneveld, Netherlands	Decision (unanimous)	3	3:00
2009-08-11	Loss	(Ukraine) Sergei Lascenko	K-1 World GP 2009 in Tokyo Final 16 Qualifying GP	Tokyo, Japan	TKO (right cross)	2	0:34
2009-08-11	Win	(Netherlands) Rico Verhoeven	K-1 World GP 2009 in Tokyo Final 16 Qualifying GP	Tokyo, Japan	Decision (unanimous)	3	3:00
2009-05-03	Win	(France) Zinedine Hameur-Lain	Nuit des Sports de Combat	Geneva, Switzerland	Decision (unanimous)	3	3:00
2009-04-11	Win	(Algeria) Azi Sofiane	La Nuit des Boxeurs Thaï	Brest, France	KO	3	
2009-01-31	Win	(Turkey) Yuksel Ayaydin	Nuit des Titans	Tours, France	Decision (unanimous)	5	
2008-05-02	Win	(Cyprus) Panayiotis Diakos	Nuit des Sports de Combat	Geneva, Switzerland	KO	1	
2007-06-29	Loss	(Hungary) Attila Karacs	Fighting European Tour 2007, Quarter Final	Martigues, France	Decision (2-1)	3	3:00
2007-04-14	Loss	(Czech Republic) Tomáš Hron	K-1 Italy Oktagon 2007	Milan, Italy	Decision (2-1)	3	3:00
2007-04-14	Win	(Italy) Daniele Petroni	K-1 Italy Oktagon 2007	Milan, Italy	TKO	1	
2006-12-16	Loss	(France) Patrice Quarteron	La Nuit des Superfights V	Villebon, France	TKO	1	
2006-06-20	Loss	(Russia) Alexander Ustinov	K-1 Fighting Network 2006 in Marseilles	Marseilles, France	KO	1	0:35
Fight was for K-1 Fighting Network 2006 in Marseilles title.
2006-06-20	Win	(France) David Dancrade	K-1 Fighting Network 2006 in Marseilles	Marseilles, France	Decision (unanimous)	3	3:00
2006-06-20	Win	(Croatia) Petar Majstorovic	K-1 Fighting Network 2006 in Marseilles	Marseilles, France	Decision (unanimous)	3	3:00
2005-11-20	Win	(Netherlands) Paul Hooplot	Enter the Plaza Muay Thai Gala	Rijswijk, Netherlands	Decision	5	3:00
2005-04-03	Win	(Netherlands) Koos Wessels	Fight Gala, Sportcentrum Schuttersveld	Rotterdam, Netherlands	TKO (doctor stoppage)		
2005-02-19	Win	(Netherlands) Peter Mulder	Rising Sun 5, Final	Beilen, Netherlands	Decision	3	2:00
Wins Rising Sun 5 Tournament title.
2005-02-19	Win	(Netherlands) Koos Wessels	Rising Sun 5, Semi Final	Beilen, Netherlands	Decision	3	2:00
2004-11-05	Win	(Romania) Remus Petrică	Total Kombat 1 "Cade Braşovul"	Braşov, Romania	TKO (referee stoppage)	3	
2004-09-04	Win	(Netherlands) Paul Hooplot	Gala Geeraets Gym	Netherlands	Decision	5	2:00
Legend: Win Loss Draw/no contest Notes

== See also ==
- List of K-1 events
- List of K-1 champions
- List of male kickboxers
