= Jan Plas =

Dutch martial artist

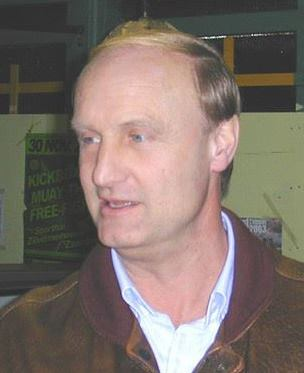
- Born: 16 March 1945; Amsterdam, Netherlands
- Died: 1 September 2010 (aged 65); Zwaag, Netherlands
- Height: 6 ft 1 in (1.85 m)
- Weight: 245 lb (111 kg; 17.5 st)
- Style: Kickboxing, Kyokushin Karate
- Stance: Orthodox
- Fighting out of: Amsterdam, Netherlands
- Team: Mejiro Gym
- Trainer: Jon Bluming, Kenji Kurosaki
- Rank: 8th dan in Kyokushin Budokai
- Years active: 1976–2008

Other information
- Notable students: Lucien Carbin, Rob Kaman, André Brilleman, Fred Royers, Tommy van de Berg, Leo de Snoo, Andre Mannaart, Bob Schrijber, Henri Hooft, Ivan Hippolyte, Ernesto Hoost, Antoni Hardonk, Rodney Glunder, Peter Aerts

Jan Plas (16 March 1945 – 1 September 2010) was a Dutch professional kickboxer, trainer and founder of the Mejiro Gym in Amsterdam. He is considered to be the father of kickboxing in the Netherlands.

== Career ==
Plas began his career in martial arts in karate, learning Kyokushin from Jon Bluming. He founded the Mejiro Gym in 1978 after learning kickboxing from Kenji Kurosaki, a Japanese martial artist who founded the original Mejiro Gym in Mejiro, Tokyo. In 1976, he founded the NKBB (The Dutch Kickboxing Association) with Thom Harinck. He also went on to run the Vos Gym and trained many world-class fighters including Lucien Carbin, Rob Kaman, Fred Royers, Andre Mannaart, Ivan Hippolyte, Ernesto Hoost and Peter Aerts.

Plas was also a member of the Dutch organized crime world. In 1986, he was involved in the kidnapping of Gijs van Dam II, the son of hash dealer Gijs van Dam, with a gang run by the drug lord Johan Verhoek, also known as "De Hakkelaar". In April 2008, Plas was arrested on suspicion of drug trafficking and his daughter and son-in-law, both police officers in Amsterdam, were charged with fraud and money laundering. In the end they were not prosecuted but they had to leave the police force.

On September 1, 2010, it was reported that Plas had committed suicide in his jail cell at the age of 65.
