= Nurhayat Hiçyakmazer =

Turkish martial artist (born 1983)

- Born: 4 October 1983 (age 42); Adana, Turkey
- Nationality: Turkish
- Weight: 65 kg (143 lb)
- Style: Boxing, Muay Thai, Kickboxing and Wushu
- Trainer: Hakan Şahade

Other information
- Occupation: Primary education teacher
- University: Gazi University, Ankara
- Spouse: Erhan Deniz
- Notable clubs: Star Academy Sport Club, Adana

Nurhayat Hiçyakmazer
Medal record

Representing Turkey

Women's Muay Thai

World Championships
Gold medal – first place	2010 Bangkok	67 kg

European Championships
Gold medal – first place	2010 Rome	67 kg

Women's Wushu - Sanshou

World Championships
Bronze medal – third place	2007 Beijing	65 kg

World Cups
Bronze medal – third place	2010 Beijing	65 kg

Nurhayat Hiçyakmazer (born 4 October 1983), nicknamed "Prenses Zeyna" (Turkish for "Xena the Warrior Princess"), is a Turkish female martial artist competing in the boxing, Muay Thai and wushu disciplines. She is a member of the Star Academy Sport Club in Adana, where she is coached by Hakan Şahade.

== Early life ==
She was born on 4 October 1983 in Adana as the second child of four siblings. Inspired by her boxer uncles, Nurhayat Hiçyakmazer began in 1995 with training in boxing. After fighting in amateur boxing some years, she got interested in wushu. In 2004, she began Muay Thai performing.

After the high school, she attended the Gazi University in Ankara, and gained in 2002 a degree in Sports and Physical Education. After some years of unemployment, she became a secondary education school teacher in Istanbul.

Asked about her nickname, she comments:

There is a saying that "a good wrestler keeps his ear intact, and a good boxer his nose". I could keep my face undemolished sofar. At a tournament in Hungary, my Russian opponents named me "Xena the Warrior Princess". My husband calls me now also "Xena".

== Family ==
On 16 September 2010 Nurhayat Hiçyakmazer married K-1 fighter Erhan "Pitbull Attack" Deniz, a Turkish kickboxing champion and her former trainer.

== Achievements ==
Muay Thai

- Gold (67 kg) 2007 European Championships - October 7–14, 2007, Vigo, Spain
- Gold (67 kg) 2010 National Championships - April 13–17, 2010, Bodrum, Turkey
- Gold (67 kg) 2010 European Championships - May 25–30, 2010, Rome, Italy
- Gold (67 kg) 2010 World Championships - November 27-December 5, 2010, Bangkok, Thailand

Wushu

- Bronze (65 kg) 4th World Cup - November 11–17, 2007, Beijing, China
- Bronze (65 kg) 9th World Wushu Championships - November 11–17, 2007, Beijing, China
