= Lucien Carbin =

Surinamese-Dutch martial artist

- Born: 7 September 1952 (age 74); Para District, Suriname
- Weight: 62 kg (137 lb; 9.8 st)
- Division: Lightweight
- Style: Kyokushin, kickboxing, savate, Muay Thai
- Fighting out of: Amsterdam, Netherlands
- Team: Fighting Factory Carbin; Mejiro Gym (1978–1982)
- Trainer: Jon Bluming, Jan Plas
- Years active: 1976–1987

Other information
- Notable students: Alistair Overeem, Tyrone Spong, Rob Kaman, Gilbert Yvel, Ilonka Elmont, Andy Ristie, Sergio Wielzen, Frank Lobman, James McSweeney, Rodney Glunder, Tiffany van Soest

Lucien Carbin (born 7 September 1952) is a Surinamese-Dutch former kickboxer, karateka and trainer. He was the first European Kyokushin karate champion, a world kickboxing champion and a European Savate and Muay Thai champion.

== Biography ==
Carbin was born in Para District, Suriname. In 1965, he moved to Amsterdam in the Netherlands. At the age of 18, Carbin joined the military where he took on unarmed combat training. He advanced quickly and after his military duty, two years later in 1972, he enrolled in the martial arts school of Jon Bluming for a Kyokushin karate class. After one year, Carbin mastered the brown belt. He also practiced pencak silat.

In 1976, Carbin was introduced to kickboxing by Jan Plas, a fellow student of Bluming and one of the teachers at the Bluming dojo. Plas went to Japan and learned about kickboxing, and when he returned to the Netherlands, he founded the Mejiro Gym, while Carbin became one of his first students. He became a professional and had a very successful career, winning several world and European titles. He lost only once in his career.

In 1978, Carbin competed in London at the first European Kyokushinkai Championship at Wembley Stadium. There were two categories at the tournament. The first - from 65 to 75 kg, the second - over 75 kg. Carbin weighed 62 kg. During the weigh-in, he had to wear heavy clothes to be allowed to fight. He won the tournament and received the prize from Mas Oyama. According to Carbin, he could not walk after the tournament for several days.

In 1987, Carbin retired from fighting and continued as a trainer. He developed his own kickboxing style, which he named "Carbin All Style". Future world champion Rob Kaman was one of his early students. Carbin founded his own gym Fighting Factory Carbin in Bijlmermeer, Amsterdam, which is considered one of the best martial arts gyms in the Netherlands. He brought up multiple world champions, such as Tyrone Spong, Alistair Overeem, Gilbert Yvel, Ilonka Elmont, Andy Ristie and Sergio Wielzen. He also trained Fedor Emelianenko for his fight against Mirko Cro Cop, who came to the Netherlands to prepare for the fight. As a trainer, he raised 49 world champions in different versions of martial arts.

== Titles and accomplishments ==
=== Karate ===
- 1978 Kyokushin European Championship Lightweight winner
- 1982 Kyokushin Dutch Open Lightweight winner

=== Muay Thai ===
- 1981 Muay Thai World -63 kg Champion
- 1984 M.T.B.N. European Super Lightweight Champion

=== Savate ===
- 1983 CNBF European Cup Lightweight Champion

== Fight record (incomplete) ==
Professional kickboxing record
Date	Result	Opponent	Event	Location	Method	Round	Time
1987-04-26	Win	(Netherlands) Mousid Akhamrane	Kampong Manis Fight Night	Amsterdam, Netherlands	Decision	5	3:00
1985-	Loss	(France) Richard Sylla	2nd Paris Savate Internationals	Paris, France	Decision		
1985-01-27	Win	(Thailand) Wanpadet Sitkhrumai	Thaiboxing	Amsterdam, Netherlands	Decision	5	3:00
?	Win	(France) Mohammed Jami		Paris, France	KO (body kick)	4	
M.T.B.N. European Super Lightweight title.
1984-06-19	Win	(Thailand) Chatchai	Thaiboxing	Amsterdam, Netherlands			
1984-05-27	Win	(France) Charry	Fists and Feet	Netherlands			
1984-03-11	Win	(United Kingdom) Lance Lewis	Thaiboxing	Rotterdam, Netherlands	KO (high kick)	1	
1984-01-15	Win	(France) Didier Le Borgne	M.T.B.N. Event	Amsterdam, Netherlands	KO (low kick)	1	
M.T.B.N. European Super Lightweight title.
1983-03-13	Win	(France) Jean-Pierre Riboulet	Savate	Amsterdam, Netherlands	Decision	5	2:00
?	Win	(United Kingdom) Mark Hoyte		Netherlands	KO	4	
1982-06-19	Win	(France) Richard Sylla	1982 Savate European Cup, Final	Paris, France	TKO (shoulder injury)	4	
Wins 1982 CNBF European Cup Lightweight title.
1981-09-20	Win	(Thailand) Wankaew Sityodtong		Netherlands	Decision	5	3:00
Wins Muay Thai World -63kg title.
1981-06-20	Loss	(Belgium) Jean-Marc Trioux	Savate - France vs Holland	Paris, France	Decision		
1981-05-03	Win	(Japan) Asumu Inaba	Kickfighters 1, Holland vs Japan	Amsterdam, Netherlands	KO (uppercut)	1	2:55
?	Win	(United Kingdom) Ronnie Green		Netherlands	KO	2	
1979-10-14	Win	(Thailand) S. Srinop		Amsterdam, Netherlands	Decision	5	3:00
1978-05-22	Win	(France) Michel Nogues		Paris, France	KO		
1978-05-08	Win	(France) Chamignon	Kickboxing Gala at Appolo Hall	Amsterdam, Netherlands		2	
1978-04-17	Win	(Belgium) J Menacho	Full Contact Holland - Belgium	Amsterdam, Netherlands	KO	1	
1978-02-18	Win	(Netherlands) Ron Kuyt		Amsterdam, Netherlands			
1977-11-28	Win	(France) Xune Ban		Amsterdam, Netherlands	KO (right cross)	2	
1976-11-29	Win	(Netherlands) D de Preter	Kickboxing Gala at Krasnapolsky Hotel	Amsterdam, Netherlands			
1976-05-31	Win	(Netherlands) Robbie Schumann		Netherlands	TKO (low kick)		
Legend: Win Loss Draw/no contest Notes
