= Global Fighting Championship =

Kickboxing and mixed martial arts promotion

- Industry: Kickboxing, Mixed martial arts
- Founded: April 2012
- Founder: Amir Shafipour
- Headquarters: Dubai, UAE
- Key people: Prince Amir Shafipour, Managing Director

Global Fighting Championship was a Dubai-based kickboxing and mixed martial arts (MMA) promotion. Fighters from around world on the roster included Badr Hari, Peter Aerts, Gökhan Saki and Zabit Samedov. It was considered as the biggest kickboxing and MMA promotion in Middle East.

== Overview ==
Each event had a 4 Man Tournament in the heavy weight division with a winning amount of AED 1 Million. Along with the 4 Man Tournament, 7 superfights were conducted with kickboxers and MMA fighters from around the world. A total of 8 fight series had to be conducted, with each winner progressing towards the grand prix of $1 Million. The first series, took place at Dubai World Trade Centre on 29 May 2014 and featured Peter Aerts, Badr Hari and Stefan Leko.

== GFC Series ==
GFC Fight Series 1 took place on 29 May 2014 at Dubai World Trade Centre, with Dutch Moroccan Badr Hari emerging as winner of the AED 1 Million defeating Australian Peter Graham in the final and advancing to the GFC Grand Prix. Michael Buffer was the presenter with Mike Markham taking over as Ring announcer and Michael Schiavello as the Commentator.

Fight Type	Fighter	Fighter	Winner
Exhibition	Peter Aerts	Dewey Cooper	Draw
4 Man Fight	Badr Hari	Stefan Leko	Badr Hari
4 Man Fight	Arnold Oborotov	Peter Graham	Peter Graham
4 Man Finals	Peter Graham	Badr Hari	Badr Hari
Superfight	Jaideep Singh	Fatih Ulusoy	Fatih Ulusoy
Superfight	Brian Douwes	Srdjan Seles	Brian Douwes
Superfight	Erkan Varol	Abbas Mollamahdi	Erkan Varol
Superfight	Gokhan Turkyilmaz	Vaughn Donayre	Vaugh Donayre
Superfight	Luke Jumeau	Hossein Mollamahdi	Luke Jumeau
Superfight	Darko Jeremic	Kamran Morovati	Kamran Morovati

GFC Fight Series 2 took place on 16 October 2014 at Dubai Duty Free Tennis Stadium, with Moroccan Ismael Lazar emerging as winner of the AED 1 Million defeating Senegal's Sem Tevette by TKO in Round 2 in the final and advancing to the GFC Grand Prix. Mike Markham was the Ring announcer along with Steve Patrick Moore. Moroccan Badr Hari was supposed to fight French Patrice Quarteron in the Exhibition Superfight, but the fight fell through. Patrice Quarteron was eventually replaced with Lithuanian Arnold Oborotov. Melvin Manhoef was replaced with Sem Tevette days before the fight due to an injury. He still came to support his replacement who lost the finals to Ismael Lazzar.

Fight Type	Fighter	Fighter	Winner
Exhibition	Badr Hari	Arnold Oborotov	Badr Hari
4 Man Fight	Ismael Lazaar	Tai Tuivasa	Ismael Lazaar
4 Man Fight	Mohamed Karim	Sem Tevette	Sem Tevette
4 Man Finals	Ismael Lazaar	Sem Tevette	Ismael Lazaar
Superfight	Adrian Gîrlonța	Davoud Ojaghi	Adrian Gîrlonța
Superfight	Mohammad Mansoori	Luke Jumeau	Luke Jumeau
Superfight	Ahmed Amir	Hossein Mollamahdi	Ahmed Amir
Superfight	Erkan Varol	Jamnian Srikam	Jamnian Srikam
Superfight	Fatih Ulusoy	Srdjan Seles	Fatih Ulusoy
Superfight	Zabit Samedov	Jafar Ahmadi	Zabit Samedov

GFC Fight Series 3 took place on 17 April 2015 at Dubai Duty Free Tennis Stadium once again. The fight card included Zabit Samedov, Danyo Ilunga and Ismael Lazaar. Gökhan Saki made an appearance in the main event against Sebastian Ciobanu.

== Controversy ==
Badr Hari vs Patrice Quarteron was the much-awaited fight among fans for GFC Fighter Series 2. Due to Quarteron's unsportsmanlike conduct, he was axed from the fight. Hari went on to say "About Patrice... he has been saying a lot about me. I don't care, I have been through those kind of clowns many times so he's nothing special,". Quarteron had made quite a hype about the fight across all social media platforms bashing Hari with memes. He was eventually replaced with Arnold Oborotov who lost to Badr Hari by KO in round 1.
