= Erhan Deniz =

Turkish kickboxer (born 1985)

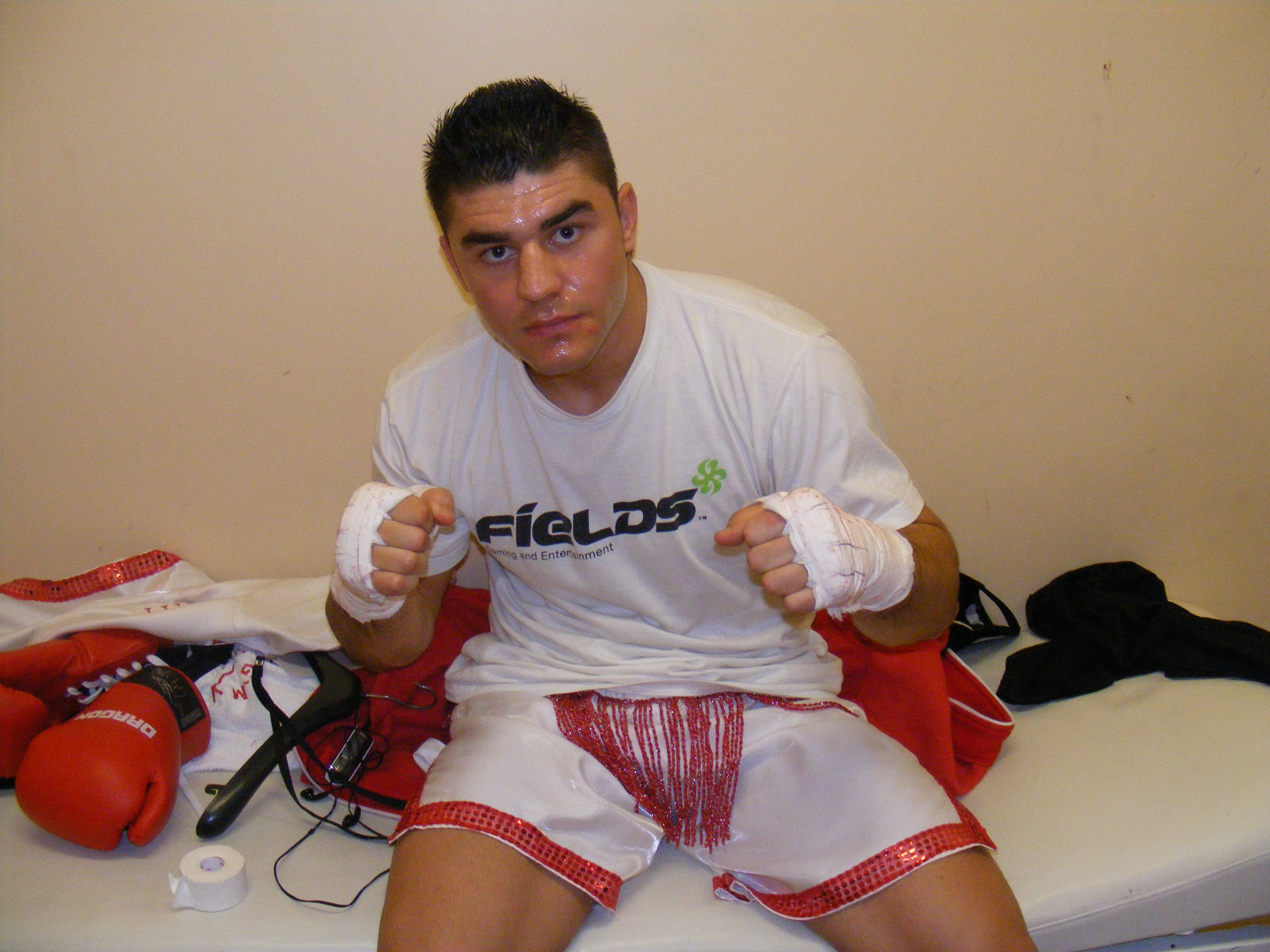
- Deniz in 2007
- Born: 28 July 1985 (age 41); Pendik, Istanbul, Turkey
- Other names: Pitbull Attack
- Nationality: Turkish
- Height: 1.84 m (6 ft 0 in)
- Weight: 97 kg (214 lb; 15.3 st)
- Division: Heavyweight
- Style: Kickboxing, Muay Thai
- Fighting out of: Istanbul, Turkey
- Team: Mejiro Gym; Global Gym; Poturak Gym
- Trainer: Andre Mannaart; Dženan Poturak
- Years active: 2006–present

Kickboxing record
- Total: 35
- Wins: 23
- By knockout: 14
- Losses: 12

Amateur record
- Total: 47
- Wins: 43
- By knockout: 33
- Losses: 4

Other information
- Spouse: Nurhayat Hiçyakmazer
- Last updated on: November 19, 2011

Erhan "Pitbull Attack" Deniz (born July 28, 1985, in Pendik, Istanbul) is a Turkish heavyweight kickboxer, who fights out of Mejiro Gym (Amsterdam) and Global Gym (Istanbul). His nickname comes from his passion for pit bull dogs.

== Career ==
Deniz began training in boxing when he was 10 years old before switching to Muay Thai. Deniz has been to Thailand several times with the Turkish national team for season camps.

Deniz first came to prominence when he won the Pro Tournament Ring Masters, a four-man tournament held at the Haldun Alagas Sport Hall in Umraniye, Istanbul on May 25, 2007. Deniz defeated Hasan Gul in the semi-final round and Eyup Kuscu in the final round becoming the Heavyweight Champion of Turkey.

Deniz made his debut with the K-1 promotion in August 2007 at the K-1 World Grand Prix 2007 in Hong Kong, where he defeated South Korean ssireum fighter Kim Dong-Wook in a reserve match for the 8-man Grand Prix taking part on that night. On November 2, 2007, Deniz took part in the Grand Prix at K-1 Fighting Network Turkey 2007 but was defeated by Brazil's Vitor Miranda at the quarter-final stage.

On June 11, 2011, Deniz made his It's Showtime debut against the Romanian Daniel Ghiță in the main event at BFN Group presents: It's Showtime Warsaw and lost via knockout in the second round due to a body shot.

== Personal life ==
On September 16, 2010, Deniz married Nurhayat Hiçyakmazer who is a Turkish, world, and European champion in several martial arts disciplines. Deniz was her former trainer.

== Titles ==
- 2011 SuperKombat World Grand Prix IV champion
- 2011 I.F.M.A European Muaythai Championships in Antalya, Turkey (bronze) +91 kg
- 2007 Pro Tournament Ring Masters champion

== Kickboxing record ==
Kickboxing record
23 wins (14 KOs), 12 losses
Date	Result	Opponent	Event	Location	Method	Round	Time	Notes
July 1, 2017	Win	(Poland) Tomasz Czerwinski	World Thai Boxing Champions Night II	Istanbul, Turkey	TKO (3 counts)	1		
April 23, 2016	Win	(Netherlands) Maikel Leimbereger	Championship Night	Istanbul, Turkey	Decision	3	3:00	
March 11, 2016	Win	(Greece) Christos Soulas	No Limit 8	Sarajevo, Bosnia and Herzegovina	Decision (unanimous)	3	3:00	
November 19, 2011	Loss	(Ukraine) Sergei Lascenko	SuperKombat World Grand Prix Final 2011	Darmstadt, Germany	TKO (doctor stoppage)	3	0:53	SuperKombat World Grand Prix Final semi-final.
October 15, 2011	Win	(Curaçao) Wendell Roche	SuperKombat World Grand Prix IV 2011	Piatra Neamț, Romania	Decision (unanimous)	3	3:00	SuperKombat World Grand Prix IV final.
October 15, 2011	Win	(Greece) Angelis Konstantinos	SuperKombat World Grand Prix IV 2011	Piatra Neamț, Romania	KO (punches)	2	1:58	SuperKombat World Grand Prix IV semi-final.
June 11, 2011	Loss	(Romania) Daniel Ghiță	BFN Group presents: It's Showtime Warsaw	Warsaw, Poland	KO (left hook to the body)	2	2:50	
March 12, 2011	Loss	(Czech Republic) Tomáš Hron	Gala night Thaiboxing	Zilina, Slovakia	Decision	3	3:00	
Dec 29, 2010	Win	(Romania) Sebastian Ciobanu	Sarajevo Fight Night 2	Sarajevo, Bosnia and Herzegovina	Decision	3	3:00	
August 14, 2010	Loss	(Switzerland) Slavo Polugić	Ergen Ring Ateşi 13	Van, Turkey	Decision	5	3:00	Fight was for WKN World Championship -96,600 kg.
June 20, 2010	Win	(Bulgaria) Petyr Vylkov	Ergen Ring Ateşi	Komotini, Greece	Decision	3	3:00	
January 9, 2010	Loss	(Tunisia) Mourad Bouzidi	Ring Sensation Championships: Uprising 12	Rotterdam, Netherlands	Decision (unanimous)	3	3:00	
October 10, 2009	Loss	(France) Freddy Kemayo	TK2 World MAX 2009	Aix-en-Provence, France	TKO (referee stoppage/broken nose)	3	-	
September 10, 2009	Loss	(Turkey) Bahadir Sari		Istanbul, Turkey	Decision	5	3:00	For ISKA Oriental Rules Heavyweight Turkish Title.
February 27, 2009	Win	(Iran) Cafer Ahmedi	Ergen Ring Ateşi 4	Turkey				
October 3, 2008	Win	(Germany) Dennis Sebastian	Ergen Ring Attest 2	Istanbul, Turkey	Decision	3	3:00	
September 28, 2008	Loss	(Ukraine) Sergei Lascenko	4th Busan TAFISA World Games	Busan, South Korea	TKO (referee stoppage)	3	-	
September 12, 2008	Loss	(New Zealand) Doug Viney	K-1 Slovakia 2008	Bratislava, Slovakia	Decision (unanimous)	3	3:00	
February 9, 2008	Loss	(Romania) Cătălin Moroșanu	K-1 World Grand Prix 2008 in Budapest Europe GP Final Elimination	Budapest, Hungary	Extra round decision (unanimous)	4	3:00	
November 2, 2007	Loss	(Brazil) Vitor Miranda	K-1 Fighting Network Turkey 2007	Istanbul, Turkey	Decision (majority)	3	3:00	2007 Turkey Grand Prix quarter-final.
September 7, 2007	Loss	(Albania) Azem Maksutaj		Bratislava, Slovakia	Decision	3	3:00	
August 5, 2007	Win	(South Korea) Kim Dong-Wook	K-1 World Grand Prix 2007 in Hong Kong	Hong Kong	KO (low kicks)	2	0:23	
May 25, 2007	Win	(Turkey) Eyüp Kuşçu	Pro Tournament Ring Masters	Istanbul, Turkey	-	-	-	Ring Masters Tournament final.
May 25, 2007	Win	(Turkey) Hasan Gül	Pro Tournament Ring Masters	Istanbul, Turkey	TKO (right high kick)	2	-	Ring Masters Tournament semi-final.
Legend: Win Loss Draw/no contest

== See also ==
- List of K-1 events
- List of male kickboxers
