= Zabit Samedov =

Azerbaijani kickboxer (born 1984)

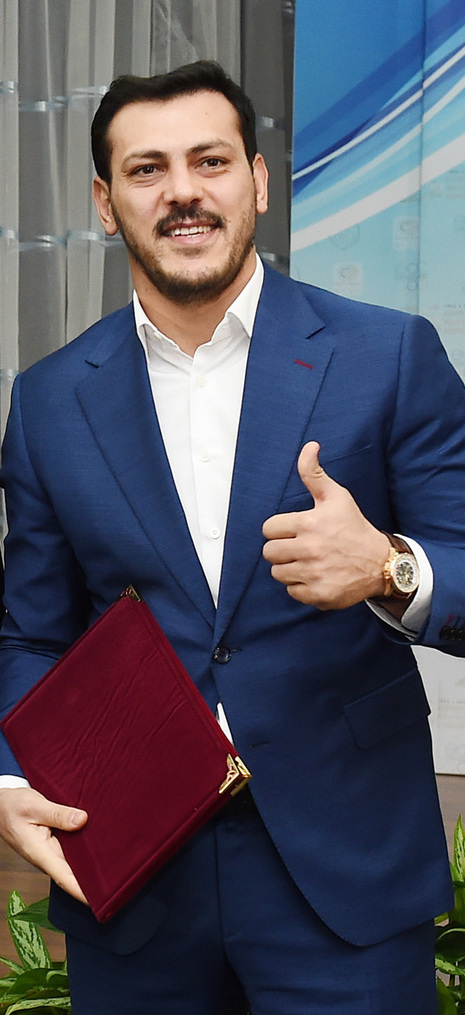
- Born: July 21, 1984 (age 42); Gardabani, Georgian SSR, Soviet Union
- Other names: Maugli (Mowgli)
- Nationality: Azerbaijani
- Height: 1.83 m (6 ft 0 in)
- Weight: 100.2 kg (221 lb; 15.78 st)
- Division: Heavyweight
- Style: Kickboxing, Muay Thai
- Trainer: Dmitry Piochesky; Aziz Dursunov (formerly)
- Years active: 1998–present (Kickboxing); 2011–2012 (MMA)

Kickboxing record
- Total: 113
- Wins: 103
- By knockout: 38
- Losses: 9
- By knockout: 2
- Draws: 1

Mixed martial arts record
- Total: 2
- Wins: 2
- By knockout: 2
- Losses: 0
- Last updated on: January 3, 2021

Zabit Samedov (Azerbaijani: Zabit Səmədov, born July 21, 1984) is an Azerbaijani kickboxer and muay thai fighter. Samedov has won multiple titles, most notably the K-1 World Grand Prix 2009 in Łódź tournament championship. He was also a competitor in the K-1 World Grand Prix FINAL in Zagreb final 8, and is a former It's Showtime 95MAX World Championship challenger.

== Early life ==
Zabit Samedov was born in Georgia into an Azerbaijani family and moved to Minsk when he was 10 years old. He started practicing martial arts at the age of 9. At very first he studied karate for 6 months under Aziz Dursunov, then switched to Muay Thai. In 1998, he joined Chinuk Gym, a well known gym based in Minsk. He trained with Alexey Ignashov and Sergei Gur under the management of his trainer Dmitriy Pyasetsky.

== Martial arts career ==
=== 2004-2008 ===
He was recruited by top martial arts organization K-1 after achieving several titles in various events between 2004 and 2006. He began to fight with consistency by attaining the title of K-1 Fighting Network in Riga in 2006 in Latvia.

On August 17, 2007, following the K-1 World GP 2007 in Las Vegas event the Nevada State Athletic Commission (NSAC) issued a statement that Samedov tested positive for Stanozolol, an anabolic steroid.

On 26 April 2008, Samedov competed in K-1 World Grand Prix 2008 in Amsterdam, dispatched Doug Viney and Brian Douwes respectively. However, he was beaten by Errol Zimmerman in the final on points.

On November 29, 2008, Samedov faced Tyrone Spong for the inaugural It's Showtime 95MAX World title, and lost by unanimous decision.

=== 2009-2012 ===
Samedov fought at the K-1 World Grand Prix 2009 in Łódź where he beat, Mindaugas Sakalauskas by unanimous decision and Raul Cătinaș and Sergei Lascenko to finally make it to the Final 16. At the K-1 World Grand Prix 2009 Final 16 Samedov was knocked out by Badr Hari in the first round. He's now set to fight Igor Jurković on United Glory 15.

He faced Xavier Vigney at the K-1 RISING World Grand Prix 2012 in Tokyo final 16 on October 14, 2012 and totally outclassed the young American, flooring him three times in the first round to win via TKO.

He was scheduled to face Andrei Stoica for the inaugural Superkombat Super Cruiserweight Championship at the Superkombat World Grand Prix 2012 Final in Bucharest, Romania on December 22 but pulled out due to illness.

=== 2013-2014 ===
At the K-1 World Grand Prix FINAL in Zagreb on March 15, 2013, in Zagreb, Croatia, he was originally drawn against Ben Edwards in the quarter-finals. However, Edwards withdrew due to having a fight booked with Paul Slowinski a week later, and was replaced by Badr Hari. Samedov was knocked down in round one and received a standing eight count in three, losing a unanimous decision.

On May 10, 2013, Samedov scored a first round high kick KO over Wiesław Kwaśniewski at Superkombat - New Heroes 3 in Vienna, Austria.

On May 25, 2013, a third fight with Badr Hari took place at Legend 1 in Moscow, Russia. Samedov dropped Hari late in round one, and sent him to the canvas again with a left hook in the second. Although Hari seemed lucid, he stayed on his knees and did not beat the count, giving Samedov the KO victory.

On November 9, 2013, he competed in the -93 kg/205 lb tournament at Legend 2: Invasion in Moscow, Russia, taking a unanimous decision over Melvin Manhoef in the semi-finals. He was set to fight Pavel Zhuravlev in the final but was unable to do so due to a cut and was replaced by Agron Preteni.

On July 6, 2014, returning to the ring for the first time in eight months, Samedov scored a 21-second high kick knockout over Stefan Leko on the undercard of the Ruslan Chagaev vs. Fres Oquendo boxing match in Grozny, Russia.

=== 2015-2021 ===
He won three more fights, defeating Jafar Ahmadi, Makoto Uehara and Mert Akın by decision.

Samedov took part in the GFC Fight Series 3 tournament. He beat Steve McKinnon by decision in the semifinals, and Danyo Ilunga by an extra round decision in the finals.

In the latter part of 2015, Samedov signed with Akhmat Fight Show, and fought almost exclusively for them over the next three years. In his organizational debut, he was scheduled to fight Dževad Poturak, whom he beat by unanimous decision. Four months later, he beat Paul Slowinski in the same manner. In 2016, he cornered Dave Leduc in Phuket, Thailand.

In his third fight with the organization, Samedov was scheduled to fight Cătălin Moroșanu for the WBC Muaythai World Heavywheight Championship. He knocked Moroșanu out in the first round, with a knee strike. Over the next two years, Samedov fought five more times: he scored stoppage wins over Evgeny Orlov and Frédéric Sinistra, and decision wins against Errol Zimmerman, Freddy Kemayo and Brice Guidon.

On April 11, 2020, following a 26-month hiatus from the sport, Samedov was scheduled to fight James McSweeney at the Mix Fight Championship. The fight was later cancelled due to the COVID-19 pandemic.

In 2021, Semedov made a comeback against Deji Kalejaiye at the WTKF Belarus event. He won the fight by a second-round TKO.

Semedov faced Didier Kilola Lubika on October 4, 2021, at ACA 130: Dudaev vs. Praia. He won the bout via TKO in the second round.

In July 2021, he was ranked the #5 heavyweight in the world by Combat Press.

== Failed drug test ==
In 2009, Samedov accused Badr Hari and Errol Zimmerman of steroid use during their fights. His claims were supported by Ruslan Karaev. In 2019, Hari was revealed to have failed a drug test by the Doping Authority Netherlands (DAN). Samedov himself tested positive for an anabolic steroid following the K-1 World Grand Prix 2007 in Las Vegas.

== Personal life ==
On October 6, 2020, during the 2020 Nagorno-Karabakh war Samedov voluntarily joined the Azeri military. He is also known for his appearance as a character called 'Gence Bey' in the Turkish TV series, Kuruluş: Osman.

== Titles ==
- International Sport Karate Association
  - 2022 ISKA K-1 World Heavyweight Champion
- World Boxing Council Muaythai
  - 2016 WBC Muaythai World Heavyweight Champion -104.50 kg
- Global Fighting Championship
  - 2015 GFC Fight Series 3 Heavyweight Tournament Champion
- K-1
  - K-1 World Grand Prix 2009 in Łódź Champion
  - 2007 K-1 World Grand Prix in Las Vegas runner up
  - 2007 K-1 Rules Kick Tournament in Marseilles champion
  - 2006 K-1 Fighting Network in Riga champion
  - 2006 K-1 Hungary champion
- KOK
  - KOK European Heavyweight Champion
- International Federation of Muaythai Amateur
  - 2006 IFMA World Amateur Muay Thai Championship Winner in Thailand
  - 2001 IFMA European Muay Thai champion
- World Muaythai Federation
  - 2006 WMF World Amateur Muay Thai Championship Winner in Thailand
- World BARS Kickboxing Federation
  - 2004 WBKF European Kickboxing champion
  - 2002 WBKF BARS Gold Cup Kickboxing champion
- World Association of Kickboxing Organizations
  - 2004 WAKO Thaiboxing World champion in Ukraine
  - 2000 WAKO Thaiboxing World Cup champion
- Kristall Cup
  - 2003 "Kristall Cup" Kickboxing runner-up
  - 2002 "Kristall Cup" Kickboxing champion

== Fight record ==
Professional Muay Thai & Kickboxing record
(112 Total) 103 Wins (38 (T)KO's, 64 decisions), 9 Losses, 1 Draw
| Date | Result | Opponent | Event | Location | Method | Round | Time |
| 2022-09-10 | Win | (Brazil) Antônio Silva | Mix Fight Championship | Baku, Azerbaijan | TKO (Punches) | 1 | 2:07 |
Wins the vacant ISKA K-1 World Heavyweight Title
| 2021-10-04 | Win | (Democratic Republic of the Congo) Didier Kilola Lubika | ACA 130: Dudaev vs. Praia | Grozny, Russia | TKO (Leg Kicks) | 2 | 1:12 |
| 2021-06-14 | Win | (Germany) Deji Kalejaiye | WTKF - M1 Fight Night | Highway, Belarus | TKO (Referee Stoppage) | 2 | |
| 2018-12-02 | Win | (Russia) Evgeny Orlov | Akhmat Fight Show | Belarus | TKO (Right low kicks) | 3 | 0:28 |
| 2018-08-16 | Win | (France) Brice Guidon | Akhmat Fight Show | Grozny, Russia | Decision (Unanimous) | 3 | 3:00 |
| 2018-05-30 | Win | (France) Freddy Kemayo | Zhara Fight Show | Moscow, Russia | Decision (Unanimous) | 5 | 2:00 |
Wins KOK European Heavyweight Title
| 2017-08-23 | Win | (Netherlands) Errol Zimmerman | Akhmat Fight Show | Grozny, Russia | Decision (Unanimous) | 3 | 3:00 |
| 2017-05-13 | Win | (Belgium) Frédéric Sinistra | Akin Dovus Arenasi | Istanbul, Turkey | TKO (Leg injury) | 2 | 1:17 |
| 2016-08-23 | Win | (Romania) Cătălin Moroșanu | Akhmat Fight Show | Grozny, Russia | KO (Right knee) | 1 | 1:13 |
Wins the WBC Muaythai World Heavywheight Championship -104.50 kg.
| 2015-12-26 | Win | (Australia) Paul Slowinski | Akhmat Fight Show | Grozny, Russia | Decision (Unanimous) | 3 | 3:00 |
| 2015-08-22 | Win | (Bosnia and Herzegovina) Dževad Poturak | Akhmat Fight Show | Grozny, Russia | Decision (Unanimous) | 3 | 3:00 |
| 2015-04-17 | Win | (Germany) Danyo Ilunga | GFC Fight Series 3 - Heavyweight Tournament, Final | Dubai, UAE | Ext.R Decision (Unanimous) | 4 | 3:00 |
Wins the GFC Fight Series 3 Heavyweight Tournament.
| 2015-04-17 | Win | (Australia) Steve McKinnon | GFC Fight Series 3 - Heavyweight Tournament, Semi Finals | Dubai, UAE | Decision (Unanimous) | 3 | 3:00 |
| 2015-02-28 | Win | (Turkey) Mert Akın | Akın Dövüş Arenası | İstanbul, Turkey | Decision (Unanimous) | 3 | 3:00 |
| 2014-12-29 | Win | (Japan) Makoto Uehara | Blade 1 | Tokyo, Japan | Extra Round Decision | 4 | 3:00 |
| 2014-10-16 | Win | (Iran) Jafar Ahmedi | GFC Fight Series 2 | Dubai, UAE | Decision | 3 | 3:00 |
| 2014-07-06 | Win | (Germany) Stefan Leko | Chagaev vs. Oquendo | Grozny, Russia | KO (Left high kick) | 1 | 0:21 |
| 2013-11-09 | Win | (Netherlands) Melvin Manhoef | Legend 2: Invasion, Semi Finals | Moscow, Russia | Decision (Unanimous) | 3 | 3:00 |
Could not advance to the final due to injury.
| 2013-09-22 | Win | (Serbia) Dragan Jovanović | Heydar Aliyev Cup 2013 | Baku, Azerbaijan | Decision (Split) | 3 | 3:00 |
| 2013-05-25 | Win | (Morocco) Badr Hari | Legend 1 | Moscow, Russia | KO (Left hook) | 2 | 2:16 |
| 2013-05-10 | Win | (Poland) Wiesław Kwaśniewski | SUPERKOMBAT New Heroes 3 | Vienna, Austria | KO (High kick) | 1 | 1:53 |
| 2013-03-15 | Loss | (Morocco) Badr Hari | K-1 World Grand Prix FINAL in Zagreb, Quarter Finals | Zagreb, Croatia | Decision (Unanimous) | 3 | 3:00 |
| 2012-10-14 | Win | (United States) Xavier Vigney | K-1 World Grand Prix 2012 in Tokyo final 16, First Round | Tokyo, Japan | TKO (Corner stoppage) | 1 | 1:47 |
| 2012-03-23 | Win | (Croatia) Igor Jurković | United Glory 15 | Moscow, Russia | Decision (Unanimous) | 3 | 3:00 |
| 2011-09-10 | Win | (Croatia) Vjekoslav Bajic | Battle Show» 2011 | Minsk, Belarus | Decision (Unanimous) | 3 | 3:00 |
| 2011-05-28 | Draw | (Turkey) Ali Cenik | United Glory 14: 2010-2011 World Series Finals | Moscow, Russia | Draw | 3 | 3:00 |
| 2010-12-29 | Win | (Ukraine) Dmytro Bezus | RMO 2010 | Istanbul, Turkey | Ext. R. Decision | 4 | 3:00 |
| 2010-05-22 | Win | (Netherlands) Alexander Novovic | APF - Azerbaijan vs. Europe | Baku, Azerbaijan | KO (Right hook) | 2 | 1:25 |
| 2010-03-19 | Win | (Netherlands) Rodney Glunder | K-1 World MAX 2010 East Europe Tournament | Minsk, Belarus | KO (Right cross) | 3 | 1:48 |
| 2010 | Win | (Moldova) Anatolie Morărescu | | Minsk, Belarus | KO (Left hook) | 1 | 2:16 |
| 2009-11-14 | Win | (Lithuania) Mindaugas Sakalauskas | Hero's Lithuania 2009 | Vilnius, Lithuania | Decision (Unanimous) | 3 | 3:00 |
| 2009-09-26 | Loss | (Morocco) Badr Hari | K-1 World Grand Prix 2009 Final 16, First Round | Seoul, Republic of Korea | KO (Right body shot) | 1 | 2:15 |
| 2009-05-23 | Win | (Ukraine) Sergei Lascenko | K-1 World Grand Prix 2009 in Łódź, Final | Łódź, Poland | TKO (Low kicks) | 3 | 2:05 |
Wins K-1 World Grand Prix 2009 in Łódź tournament title.
| 2009-05-23 | Win | (Romania) Raul Cătinaș | K-1 World Grand Prix 2009 in Łódź, Semi Finals | Łódź, Poland | Decision (Unanimous) | 3 | 3:00 |
| 2009-05-23 | Win | (Lithuania) Mindaugas Sakalauskas | K-1 World Grand Prix 2009 in Łódź, Quarter Finals | Łódź, Poland | Ext. R Decision (Unanimous) | 4 | 3:00 |
| 2009-02-27 | Win | (Latvia) Konstantin Gluhov | K-1 Professional International tournament | Baku, Azerbaijan | Decision (Unanimous) | 3 | 3:00 |
| 2008-11-29 | Loss | (Suriname) Tyrone Spong | It's Showtime 2008 Eindhoven | Eindhoven, Netherlands | Decision (Unanimous) | 5 | 3:00 |
Fight was for It's Showtime 95MAX World title.
| 2008-09-27 | Win | (Brazil) Fabiano da Silva | K-1 World GP 2008 Final 16, Super Fight | Seoul, Republic of Korea | Decision (Unanimous) | 3 | 3:00 |
| 2008-09-12 | Win | (Czech Republic) Luboš Šuda | K-1 Slovakia 2008 | Bratislava, Slovakia | TKO (Referee stoppage) | 3 | 1:29 |
| 2008-07-13 | Win | (New Zealand) Ray Sefo | K-1 World GP 2008 in Taipei | Taipei City, Taiwan | 2 Ext.R Decision (Split) | 5 | 3:00 |
| 2008-06-06 | Win | (Romania) Sebastian Ciobanu | Local Kombat 30 | Timișoara, Romania | Ext.R Decision | 4 | 3:00 |
| 2008-04-26 | Loss | (Netherlands) Errol Zimmerman | K-1 World GP 2008 in Amsterdam, Final | Amsterdam, Netherlands | Decision (Majority) | 3 | 3:00 |
Fight was for K-1 World GP 2008 in Amsterdam tournament title.
| 2008-04-26 | Win | (Netherlands) Brian Douwes | K-1 World GP 2008 in Amsterdam, Semi Finals | Amsterdam, Netherlands | Ext.R Decision (Unanimous) | 4 | 3:00 |
| 2008-04-26 | Win | (New Zealand) Doug Viney | K-1 World GP 2008 in Amsterdam, Quarter Finals | Amsterdam, Netherlands | Decision (Unanimous) | 3 | 3:00 |
| 2008-02-09 | Win | (Brazil) Vitor Miranda | K-1 World GP 2008 in Budapest | Budapest, Hungary | Decision (Majority) | 3 | 3:00 |
| 2007-11-02 | Win | (France) David Dancrade | K-1 Fighting Network Turkey 2007 | Istanbul, Turkey | 2 Ext.R Decision (Unanimous) | 5 | 3:00 |
| 2007-10-13 | Win | (Italy) Luca Sabatini | K-1 Fighting Network Latvia 2007 | Riga, Latvia | KO (Left cross) | 1 | N/A |
| 2007-08-11 | Loss | (New Zealand) Doug Viney | K-1 World Grand Prix 2007 in Las Vegas | Las Vegas, Nevada, United States | Decision (Unanimous) | 3 | 3:00 |
Fight was for K-1 World Grand Prix 2007 in Las Vegas tournament title.
| 2007-08-11 | Win | (United States) Patrick Barry | K-1 World Grand Prix 2007 in Las Vegas | Las Vegas, Nevada, United States | Decision (Split) | 3 | 3:00 |
| 2007-08-11 | Win | (United States) Esh'Chadar Brown Ton | K-1 World Grand Prix 2007 in Las Vegas | Las Vegas, Nevada, United States | KO (Spinning back kick) | 2 | 1:05 |
| 2007-06-23 | Loss | (Australia) Paul Slowinski | K-1 World GP 2007 in Amsterdam, Semi Finals | Amsterdam, Netherlands | TKO (Low kicks) | 1 | 2:47 |
| 2007-06-23 | Win | (Germany) James Phillips | K-1 World GP 2007 in Amsterdam, Quarter Finals | Amsterdam, Netherlands | Decision | 3 | 3:00 |
| 2007-04-14 | Win | (Germany) Kevin Klinger | K-1 Gladiators 2007 in Estonia | Tallinn, Estonia | Decision | 3 | 3:00 |
| 2007-03-04 | Win | (Japan) Tsuyoshi Nakasako | K-1 World GP 2007 in Yokohama | Yokohama, Japan | Decision | 3 | 3:00 |
| 2007-01-26 | Win | (France) Gregory Tony | K-1 Rules Kick Tournament 2007 in Marseilles | Marseilles, France | KO (Right hook) | 3 | 2:30 |
Wins K-1 Rules Kick Tournament 2007 in Marseilles tournament title.
| 2007-01-26 | Win | (Czech Republic) Karl Dubus | K-1 Rules Kick Tournament 2007 in Marseilles | Marseilles, France | Decision | 3 | 3:00 |
| 2007-01-26 | Win | (Romania) Aurel Bococi | K-1 Rules Kick Tournament 2007 in Marseilles | Marseilles, France | Decision | 3 | 3:00 |
| 2007-01-13 | Win | (France) Daniel Lentie | K-1 Rules Heavyweight Tournament 2007 in Turkey | Istanbul, Turkey | Ext.R Decision | 4 | 3:00 |
| 2006-12-16 | Win | (Canada) Michael McDonald | K-1 Fighting Network Prague Round '07 | Prague, Czech Republic | TKO | 3 | N/A |
| 2006-11-04 | Win | (Ukraine) Maxim Neledva | K-1 Fighting Network Riga 2006 | Riga, Latvia | Decision (Split) | 3 | 3:00 |
Wins K-1 Fighting Network Riga 2006 tournament title.
| 2006-11-04 | Win | (Poland) Mariusz Kornacki | K-1 Fighting Network Riga 2006 | Riga, Latvia | TKO | 1 | 2:42 |
| 2006-11-04 | Win | (Russia) Konstantin Uriadov | K-1 Fighting Network Riga 2006 | Riga, Latvia | KO | 2 | 2:59 |
| 2006-08-18 | Win | (Croatia) Marko Tomasović | K-1 Hungary 2006 | Debrecen, Hungary | KO | 1 | N/A |
Wins K-1 Hungary 2006 tournament title.
| 2006-08-18 | Win | (Hungary) Zsolt Bertalan | K-1 Hungary 2006 | Debrecen, Hungary | KO | 2 | N/A |
| 2006-08-18 | Win | (Hungary) Péter Varga | K-1 Hungary 2006 | Debrecen, Hungary | Decision (Unanimous) | 3 | 3:00 |
| 2006-02-22 | Win | (Uzbekistan) Gamzat Islamagamedov | WBKF European Muay Thai title, (-93 kg) | Moscow, Russia | KO | 3 | N/A |
| 2005-09-28 | Win | (Ukraine) Maxim Neledva | WBKF European Muay Thai title (93 kg) | Moscow, Russia | Decision | 5 | 3:00 |
| 2005-07-13 | Win | (Belarus) Alexey Kudin | Fight Club Arbat | Moscow, Russia | TKO | 4 | N/A |
| 2005-05-09 | Win | (Russia) Sergei Matkin | Ufa | Russia | Decision | 5 | 3:00 |
| 2005-03-30 | Win | (Russia) Ruslan Baklanov | Fight Club Arbat | Moscow, Russia | KO | 5 | N/A |
| 2005-02-22 | Win | (Russia) Magomed Kamilov | Ufa | Russia | KO | 2 | N/A |
| 2005-01-26 | Win | (Russia) Salim Abakarov | Fight Club Arbat (86 kg) | Moscow, Russia | TKO | 5 | N/A |
| 2004-11-13 | Win | (Finland) Topi Helin | Fight Festival 12 | Finland | Decision (Split) | 5 | 3:00 |
| 2004-04-28 | Win | (Uzbekistan) Gamzat Islamagamedov | WBKF European Muay Thai title (-81 kg) | Moscow, Russia | Decision | 5 | 3:00 |
| 2003-12-29 | Loss | (Russia) Magomed Magomedov | WBKF Golden Panther Cup Finals (81 kg) @ Club Arbat | Moscow, Russia | Decision (Split) | 8 | 2:00 |
Fight was for WBKF Golden Panther Cup title.
| 2003-11-19 | Win | (Russia) Ubaydulla Chopolayev | WBKF Golden Panther Cup 1/2 finals (81 kg) @ Club Arbat | Moscow, Russia | Decision (Unanimous) | 5 | 2:00 |
| 2003-11-19 | Win | (Russia) Vitaly Shemetov | WBKF Golden Panther Cup 1/4 finals (81 kg) @ Club Arbat | Moscow, Russia | Decision (Unanimous) | 3 | 3:00 |
| 2003-08-14 | Win | (Russia) Habib Gadjiev | Kristall Cup final (76 kg) | Moscow, Russia | Decision | 5 | 3:00 |
Win "Kristall Cup" Kickboxing title.
| 2003-08-14 | Win | (Belarus) Alexey Kharkevich | Kristall Cup 1/2 finals (76 kg) | Moscow, Russia | Decision | 5 | 3:00 |
| 2003-05-28 | Loss | (Russia) Magomed Kamilov | BARS "Arbat" | Moscow, Russia | Decision | 5 | 3:00 |
| 2003-03-19 | Loss | (Belarus) Dmitry Shakuta | BARS - Cup of Arbat Final | Moscow, Russia | Decision | 5 | 3:00 |
Fight was for "Cup of Arbat" Kickboxing title.
| 2003-03-12 | Win | (Russia) Kanatbek Sydygaliyev | BARS - Cup of Arbat Semifinals | Moscow, Russia | Decision (Majority) | 5 | 3:00 |
| 2003-03-06 | Win | (Russia) Aleksandr Shlakunov | BARS - Cup of Arbat Quarterfinals | Moscow, Russia | Decision | 5 | 3:00 |
| 2003-01-29 | Win | (Russia) Pavel Boloyangov | BARS - Cup of Arbat | Moscow, Russia | ТKO | 3 | N/A |
| 2002-09-18 | Win | (Russia) Abdula Gusniyev | BARS - Cup of Arbat Final | Moscow, Russia | Decision (Split) | 5 | 3:00 |
Wins "Cup of Arbat" Kickboxing title.
| 2002-09-12 | Win | (Russia) Khabib Ghadzhiyev | BARS - Cup of Arbat Semifinals | Moscow, Russia | Decision (Split) | 5 | 3:00 |
| 2002-09-04 | Win | (Ukraine) Vladimir Todorov | BARS - Cup of Arbat Quarterfinals | Moscow, Russia | Decision (Split) | 5 | 3:00 |
| 2002-02-20 | Win | (Russia) Anderi Negriy | N/A | Moscow, Russia | Decision | 5 | 2:00 |
| 2001-12-01 | Win | (Russia) Igor Berezuk | BARS - Cup of Arbat | Moscow, Russia | Decision | 3 | 3:00 |
| 2001-05-29 | Win | (Russia) Sergey Ikrennikov | Fight Club Arbat | Moscow, Russia | TKO | 1 | N/A |
| 2001-05-08 | Win | (Russia) Andrei Gazarov | Fight Club Arbat | Moscow, Russia | KO | 5 | N/A |
Legend: Win Loss Draw/No contest Notes

Amateur Muay Thai & Kickboxing record
| Date | Result | Opponent | Event | Location | Method | Round | Time |
|---|---|---|---|---|---|---|---|
| 2006-06-07 | Win | (Ukraine) Vjacheslav Migolatjev | IFMA World Amateur Muay Thai Championship final | Bangkok, Thailand | N/A | N/A | N/A |
Wins IFMA World Amateur Muay Thai Championship title.
| 2006-06-06 | Win | (Australia) Harold Olsen | IFMA World Amateur Muay Thai Championship 1/2 finals | Bangkok, Thailand | N/A | N/A | N/A |
| 2006-06-03 | Win | (Germany) Pedram Toutian | IFMA World Amateur Muay Thai Championship 1/4 finals | Bangkok, Thailand | TKO (Referee stoppage) | 2 | N/A |
| 2006-03-26 | Win | (Russia) Maksim Vinogradov | WMF World Amateur Muay Thai Championship Finals | Bangkok, Thailand | Decision | 5 | 3:00 |
Wins WMF World Amateur Muay Thai Championship title.
| 2006-03-24 | Win | (Turkey) Erhan Deniz | WMF World Amateur Muay Thai Championship 1/2 Finals | Bangkok, Thailand | Decision | 5 | 3:00 |
Legend: Win Loss Draw/No contest Notes

== Mixed martial arts record ==
Professional record breakdown
| 8 matches | 7 wins | 1 loss |
| By knockout | 2 | 0 |
| By decision | 1 | 0 |
| Unknown | 4 | 1 |

| Res. | Record | Opponent | Method | Event | Date | Round | Time | Location | Notes |
|---|---|---|---|---|---|---|---|---|---|
| Win | 12–2 | Vitali Oparin | KO (spinning back kick) | Russian MMA Championship | June 1, 2012 | 1 | N/A | Saint Petersburg, Russia | |
| Win | 11–2 | Yuri Gorbenko | TKO (retirement) | RF - Real Fight-FC | March 25, 2011 | 1 | 5:00 | Minsk, Belarus | |
| Win | 4–1 | Khabib Gadzhiev | ? | BARS | January 24, 2002 | ? | | Moscow, Russia | |
| Win | 3–1 | Igor Bereziuk | Decision | BARS | December 6, 2001 | ? | | Moscow, Russia | |
| Loss | 2–1 | Vladimir Kalyuzhniy | ? | BARS: Datsik vs. Getsadze | November 22, 2001 | ? | | Moscow, Russia | |
| Win | 2–0 | Ruslan Gasanov | ? | BARS: Musaev vs. Shemetov | July 5, 2001 | ? | | Moscow, Russia | |
| Win | 1–0 | Murad Magamedov | ? | BARS: Samedov vs. Magamedov | October 25, 2001 | ? | | Moscow, Russia | |

== See also ==
- List of K-1 events
- List of K-1 champions
- List of male kickboxers
