= Badr Hari =

Moroccan-Dutch kickboxer (born 1984)

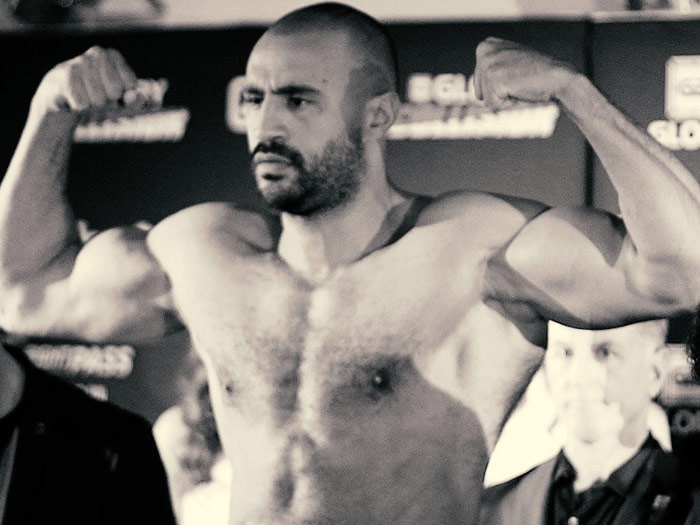
- Hari in 2016
- Born: Badr Hari; 8 December 1984 (age 41); Amsterdam, Netherlands
- Other names: The Golden Boy; Bad Boy
- Height: 198 cm (6 ft 6 in)
- Weight: 115 kg (254 lb; 18 st 2 lb)
- Division: Heavyweight
- Reach: 213 cm (84 in)
- Style: Kickboxing, Muay Thai
- Fighting out of: Morocco (2005–present)
- Team: SB Gym (2021–2022); Mike's Gym (2005–2021, 2023–present); Chakuriki Gym (2000–2005)
- Trainer: Said El Badaoui (2021–2022); Mike Passenier (2005–2021, 2023–present); Thom Harinck (2000–2005)
- Years active: 2000–present (kickboxing); 2002 (MMA)

Kickboxing record
- Total: 126
- Wins: 106
- By knockout: 92
- Losses: 17
- By knockout: 14
- No contests: 3

Mixed martial arts record
- Total: 1
- Wins: 0
- Losses: 1
- By submission: 1

Other information
- Website: www.badrhari.store
- Mixed martial arts record from Sherdog
- Last updated on: 09 September 2023

Badr Hari (Arabic: بدر هاري; born 8 December 1984) is a Dutch-Moroccan former professional kickboxer and Muay Thai fighter. Born in Amsterdam, Hari made his professional kickboxing debut in 2000, and quickly rose to fame with his aggressive and explosive style. In 2002, he became the WPKL Dutch Muay Thai champion and The Eight Tournament champion (Muay Thai). In 2007, he became the K-1 Heavyweight World Champion when he defeated Yusuke Fujimoto by knockout in 56 seconds.

In 2009, Hari reached the final of the K-1 World Grand Prix for the second time. Also that year, he became the It's Showtime Heavyweight World Champion. He would defend his title against Mourad Bouzidi, before losing it to Hesdy Gerges in May 2010 by disqualification. In 2012, Hari faced a two-year suspension from kickboxing after being found guilty of assault charges. Two years later, he won the GFC Fight Series 1 Heavyweight Tournament Championship when he defeated Peter Graham by technical knockout in the first round. In 2016, he made his Glory debut in a highly anticipated bout against Heavyweight champion Rico Verhoeven, which he lost by technical knockout (arm injury) in the second round.

Hari is widely considered one of the greatest kickboxers of all time. He is credited for increasing the popularity of kickboxing in Morocco, becoming a national icon and a source of pride for many Moroccans due to his success in the sport.

== Early life ==
Hari was born and raised in Amsterdam. He is of Berber descent and his parents are Moroccans from the Houara tribe, who relocated to the Netherlands before Hari was born. Hari began practicing kickboxing at the age of seven, under the guidance of former World Champion Mousid Akamrane. As a teenager he trained at the Sitan Gym of Mohammed Aït Hassou. When the Sitan Gym moved to Rotterdam, he joined the famous Chakuriki Gym run by Thom Harinck. Hari was fighting under the Dutch flag until a loss against Stefan Leko in 2005. It was the first time his parents attended one of his fights and he was asked to address the Dutch audience. Hari could not be understood and the audience proceeded to boo him, after which Hari was quoted saying "I thought to myself, I have never witnessed such ungratefulness". From then on Hari has represented Morocco and stopped working with Thom Harinck. Mike Passenier became his new coach.

== Kickboxing career ==
=== Early career ===
At the age of seven, Hari was sent by his father to the kickboxing gym to learn how to defend himself from bullies in the neighborhood. People realized he was a talent and from the age of 11 he was fighting regularly as a junior. In his teenage years he worked with the trainer Thom Harinck at Chakuriki Gym and it was at this time he started to become known in the Amsterdam scene.

At the age of 18 Hari had 50 amateur fights on record and was ready to fight at a professional level. A year later he was fighting in front of an audience of thousands at the Johan Cruijf Arena, the biggest soccer stadium in the Netherlands. His opponent was Alexey Ignashov. Hari took the fight on short notice and lost, but won respect from the crowd and from Ignashov for his display of heart. (reference needed)

=== Road to K-1 ===
Hari's road to fame began with a pair of matches against Stefan Leko in 2005. The first took place at an It's Showtime 2005 event in June 2005. Hari had started trash talk between him and his opponent before the fight but Hari's unusually long ring entrance ended up being longer than the fight itself, where Hari was knocked out by Leko's trademark spinning back kick.

Hari in November 2005 entered the K-1 World Grand Prix 2005 tournament as a reserve fighter against Leko, making his K-1 World GP debut at the age of 20. Hari knocked out Leko by a spinning back high kick to the jaw at 1:30 in the second round. After the bad blood between both fighters, Hari helped his opponent up and escorted the dazed German to the corner.

=== K-1 New Zealand 2006 ===
In 2006, Badr Hari was scheduled to participate in the K-1 World Grand Prix 2006 in Amsterdam on 13 May, but fought in the K-1 World Grand Prix 2006 in Auckland, in New Zealand, instead as a last minute replacement. His opponent in the first round was Australian Peter "The Chief" Graham. In the actual fight Hari was knocked out by Graham's trademark "Rolling Thunder". The heel hit Hari hard on the head and knocked him out.

=== Return to K-1 ===
Hari returned to the ring at the K-1 World Grand Prix 2006 final elimination in Osaka, Japan against Ruslan Karaev. Karaev hurt Badr with a straight right that left Hari slouching over in the corner, then Karaev delivered a kick to Hari's face: Hari was counted out by the referee/ Six months later, Hari would get a rematch.

Despite being knocked out, Hari was once again picked as a reserve fighter in the K-1 Grand Prix 2006 Finals against Paul Slowinski. He won the fight by unanimous decision. Hari then fought the Danish Nicholas Pettas at the K-1 Premium 2006 Dynamite!! event and broke Pettas's left shoulder in the second round with a right high kick.

Hari got his revenge against Karaev at the K-1 World GP 2007 in Yokohama. Karaev and Hari's matchup was one of two bouts to qualify for the first K-1 heavyweight title match, scheduled on 28 April 2007 in Hawaii. Hari landed a right cross to score a KO.

=== K-1 Heavyweight champion ===
On 28 April, at K-1 World GP 2007 in Hawaii, Badr Hari and Yusuke Fujimoto fought for the newly introduced Heavyweight belt. Hari won the fight in 56 seconds with a kick to the chin. Hari became the first ever K-1 Heavyweight champion. (Citation needed)

Hari got his chance for revenge against Peter Graham, whose turning kick had broken his jaw in 2006, in Hong Kong at the K-1 World Grand Prix 2007 in Hong Kong. He dropped Graham with a body punch and won by unanimous decision. After the bout, Hari and Graham seemed to bury the hatchet, hugging each other, although the two started taunting each other again at the post-fight press conference.

In September 2007 at the K-1 World GP 2007 final elimination, Badr Hari beat the K-1 World GP 2007 in Las Vegas tournament champion, Doug Viney, by a second-round KO and qualified for his first K-1 World GP Final, held on 8 December in Yokohama, Japan. His winning streak came to an end with a decision loss to Remy Bonjasky, in the quarter-finals.

=== 2008 ===
==== K-1 World GP 2008 ====
All of Hari's wins in 2008 were by knockouts, by beating Ray Sefo in Yokohama, Glaube Feitosa (whom he defended his heavyweight title) in Fukuoka and Domagoj Ostojic in Hawaii. On his next fight in Seoul he qualified for the K-1 World Grand Prix 2008 Final by TKO win over the Korean Hong Man Choi.

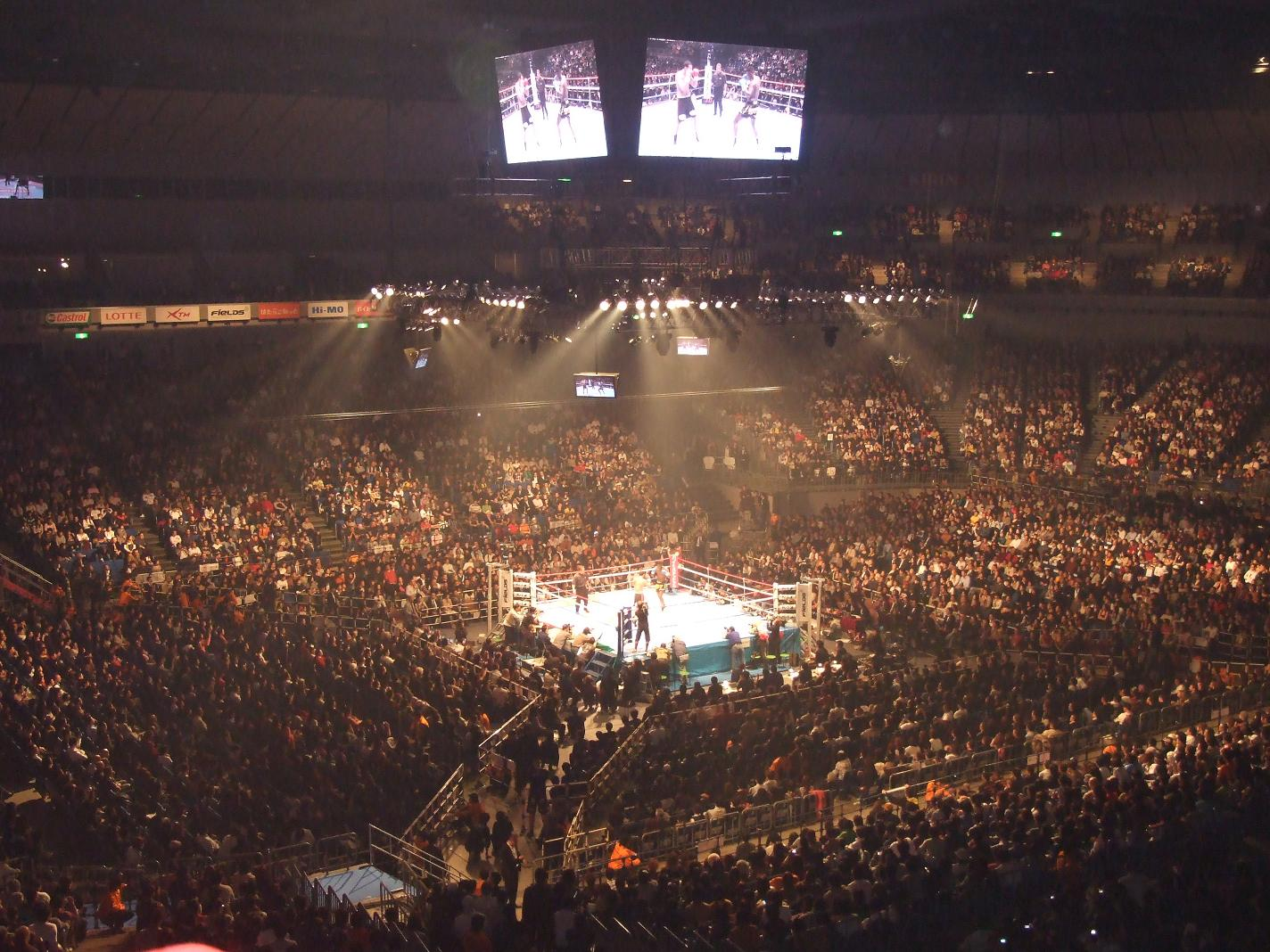
Hari facing Remy Bonjasky in the K-1 World Grand Prix 2008 Final

In the quarterfinals on 6 December, Hari defeated three time K-1 World champion Peter Aerts by TKO in the second round. In the semi-final he knocked out Errol Zimmerman and advanced to his first K-1 Final against Remy Bonjasky. After suffering a knockdown in the first, Hari was disqualified in the second round for unsportsmanlike conduct by having stomped and punched an already downed Bonjasky. First the referee Nobuaki Kakuda issued a yellow card and one point deduction. Meanwhile, Hari proceeded to Bonjasky's corner shouting, and quarreled with his opponent's trainer Ivan Hippolyte who then also approached Hari aggressively, but the officials prevented any further physical contact between them. After the five-minute recovery time elapsed, the doctor reported Bonjasky was seeing double and could not continue. Hari was issued a red card and Bonjasky was declared the K-1 World GP 2008 champion.

In later interviews Hari claimed Bonjasky was acting, and that "Remy's corner was screaming at him to stay down". At a press conference before the K-1 World Grand Prix 2009 in Yokohama, where Alistair Overeem attended along with Bonjasky, Overeem handed Bonjasky a statue which looked exactly like the statue of Oscar, implying Bonjasky was acting.

Although numerous Japanese media sources assumed that K-1 would suspend Hari indefinitely, he was not suspended, but he received the most severe punishment in the history of K-1. K-1 stripped him of his heavyweight title, his runner-up title in the tournament, his prize money from the tournament and the full amount of his fee for participation in the tournament.

==== Dynamite!! 2008 ====
While there were many rumours of his and his opponent's participation, it was finally announced that Hari would face MMA Heavyweight Alistair Overeem in a K-1 rules match on K-1's New Year's Eve extravaganza Dynamite!! 2008. Hari lost the fight by a left hook KO at 2:02 in the first round. After the match, Hari commented that this would be the last time he would participate in the Dynamite!! series, and that he would stick to stand-up fighting so he would never have an MMA rules match with Overeem.

=== 2009 ===
In May 2009 at the It's Showtime 2009 Amsterdam, Hari fought Semmy Schilt in a bout for the newly introduced It's Showtime World Heavyweight title. Hari came out very aggressively and knocked Schilt down twice in the first round. The fight was stopped after the second knockdown and Hari took the heavyweight title in 45 seconds. Simon Rutz, the president of It's Showtime, has referred to this as one of his favorite bouts in the history of It's Showtime.

In September 2009 at the K-1 World Grand Prix 2009 Final 16, Hari again used his right body shot to score a first-round knockout over Zabit Samedov.

At the selection for the K-1 World Grand Prix 2009 Final Hari chose to fight Ruslan Karaev for the third time. He made quick work of his first 2 opponents in the tournament with first-round knockouts over Ruslan Karaev and Alistair Overeem. Then in the final of the World Grand Prix Hari lost in a rematch against Semmy Schilt by KO after being knocked down 3 times in the first round.

=== 2010 ===
His first fight in 2010 was at the It's Showtime 2010 Prague in the Czech Republic, where Hari defended his Showtime heavyweight title with a second-round knockout over Mourad Bouzidi. In April Hari defeated Alexey Ignashov in the K-1 World Grand Prix 2010 in Yokohama. The fight went to decision, Hari's first non-knockout win in 3 years.

==== It's Showtime 2010 Amsterdam ====
Hari's Showtime title was again on the line against his former Chakuriki fellow Hesdy Gerges in Amsterdam in May. Before the match, he claimed in a press interview that his opponent at the event was originally planned to be Remy Bonjasky but Bonjasky refused to fight Hari, stating Bonjasky was afraid to lose.

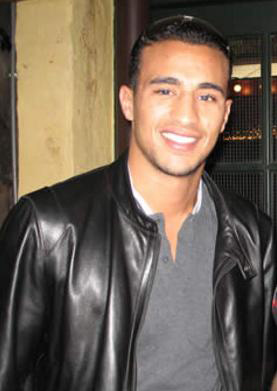
Hari in 2007

The It's Showtime 2010 Amsterdam event took place at the Amsterdam Arena in May 2010. Hari dominated most of the first round, hitting Gerges many times and having him on the ropes. Hesdy surprised everyone on the night for taking the punishment. In the second round, Hari knocked down Gerges, and when Gerges was standing up, Badr Hari kicked him in the face. Badr was again disqualified and did not speak in the ring after Gerges was announced the winner. Instead, training partner Melvin Manhoef apologized to the fans on Badr's behalf but was booed by the crowd. Gerges became the new "Its Showtime" Heavyweight champion.

=== 2011 ===
After the Gerges fight, Hari took a year off from kickboxing. He stated that it was his own choice. He made his return to the ring at It's Showtime 2011 Lyon against French Kickboxer, Gregory Tony. Hari won by TKO in round one.

Though the biggest interest was for Badr to rematch Hesdy Gerges for the Showtime heavyweight title it was announced that he would fight Romanian Daniel Ghita in September. Ghita had been ranked as one of the best 5 kickboxers in the world. Ghita had lost a decision against Gerges earlier in the year, but many felt he had been robbed and viewed him as a tough opponent for Hari.

The fight never materialised. Hari stated that he will compete in the 2011 K-1 World Grand Prix in October and December, and then face Gökhan Saki in the Netherlands on 28 January 2012 as his final match. However the K-1 World Grand Prix was cancelled due to financial difficulties.

=== 2012 ===
Hari faced Gökhan Saki at It's Showtime 2012 in Leeuwarden on 28 January 2012 in a kickboxing match. He defeated Saki by scoring three knockdowns in the first round before the referee stopped the fight, which earned him a TKO victory. He dropped Saki for the first time with a right uppercut. The second knockdown came from a right hook. Finally, he landed a right uppercut which dropped Saki and ended the fight.

In April 2012 new K-1 Global President Mike Kim announced that Hari would make his comeback under the organization's banner. Hari's first fight was on 27 May 2012 in Madrid, Spain against Anderson "Braddock" Silva. Hari won the bout via unanimous decision. Badr Hari was scheduled to participate in K-1's final qualifications in October in Asia and the K-1 World Grand Prix Final in New York in December however he was unable to participate due to uncertainty over his availability following allegations of two separate incidents of serious assault.

=== 2013 ===
Having been released from detention, Hari was given the chance to fight in the K-1 World Grand Prix FINAL in Zagreb in Zagreb, Croatia on 15 March 2013 when Ben Edwards withdrew. He rematched Zabit Samedov in the quarter-finals. Hari scored a knockdown early in round one and forced a standing eight count in three, after which he simply jogged away from Samedov for the rest of the fight while the Azerbaijani taunted him. He won by unanimous decision but injured his foot in the bout and was forced to bow out of the tournament.

A third fight with Zabit Samedov took place at the Legend Fighting Show in Moscow, Russia on 25 May 2013. After being dropped late in round one, he was sent to the canvas again with a left hook in the second. Although he seemed lucid, he stayed on his knees and did not beat the count.

Hari had his rubber match with Alexey Ignashov at Legend Fighting Show 2 in Moscow on 9 November 2013, taking a unanimous decision win in a rather lackluster fight.

=== 2014 ===
Hari was expected to fight Ismael Londt at the A1 World Combat Cup in Eindhoven, Netherlands on 17 May 2014 but the match was cancelled when the promoters had issues acquiring a license to promote the event. Hari won a four-man (Tammam Majzoub was supposed to be in this fight but cancelled due to busy schedule) tournament at GFC Series 1 in Dubai, United Arab Emirates on 29 May 2014, having his rubber match with two former foes; he knocked out Stefan Leko in the semi-finals and scored a TKO over Peter Graham in the final. He reportedly earned 1,000,000 Emirati dirham in prize money for the tournament win.

On 6 July 2014, Hari announced via social media his intention to take an indefinite leave from kickboxing in order to find himself. The following day, however, he denied ever making such a statement and disavowed his "official" Facebook account.

Hari was expected to fight Patrice Quarteron at GFC Series 2 in Dubai, UAE on 16 October 2014. Eventually, he refused the fight, and fought a Lithuanian fighter instead, saying Quarteron did not behave sportingly.

=== 2016–2026 ===
Hari made his Glory debut against the reigning Heavyweight Champion Rico Verhoeven at Glory: Collision on October 12, 2016. Hari appeared to have won the first round, opening a cut on Verhoeven's nose. Verhoeven was more aggressive in the second round and landed knee in the clinch which broke Hari's arm. As Hari was unable to continue fighting, Verhoeven was awarded the technical knockout victory.

On 3 March 2018, Hari fought Gerges. Hari won the fight by unanimous decision, but a year after the fight it was revealed that both fighters had used sports supplements that contained prohibited substances; as a result, both fighters were suspended. Hari failed a drug test prior to Glory 51: Rotterdam, and was issued with a 19-month suspension after tests on samples provided indicated a violation of Netherlands rules regarding prohibited substances for competitive athletes. Gerges, who faced Hari at the event, was also issued with an official reprimand.

On April 20, 2019, it was announced that Hari failed a drug test prior to Glory 51: Rotterdam. He was issued with a 19-month suspension after tests on samples provided indicated a violation of Doping Autoriteit Netherlands rules regarding prohibited substances for competitive athletes. Hesdy Gerges, who faced Hari at the event, was also issued with an official reprimand.

Hari challenged Rico Verhoeven for the Glory Heavyweight Championship in his first post-suspension fight. The bout took place at Glory 74: Arnhem on 21 December 2019. In the sold-out GelreDome, in front of 30 000 fans, Verhoeven won the fight by a third-round technical knockout. Hari once again found early success, knocking Verhoeven down in both the first and third rounds. Early on in the third round however, Hari suffered a broken ankle from a missed kick, once again rendering him unable to continue competing.

Aside from selling out the arena, the rematch also drew 3.5 million viewers, an estimated 53% of the live television audience in the Netherlands, which was the second highest viewership of a live sports broadcast, in Dutch television history.

On 19 December 2020, Hari fought the #2 ranked Glory heavyweight contender, Benjamin Adegbuyi in a Glory Heavyweight Championship Eliminator at Glory 76. The fight was originally planned to take place on 20 June, but was postponed multiple times due to the COVID-19 pandemic. On 13 September, Glory announced the event would take place on 7 November, only for it be postponed again to 19 December 2020, when Hari announced that he tested positive for COVID-19 on 19 October. At the fight, Hari lost the fight by KO in the third round after being kicked by Adegbuyi.

It was announced on 31 May 2021, that Hari would face the #8 ranked Glory heavyweight contender Arkadiusz Wrzosek. The bout was scheduled as the main event of Glory 78: Arnhem, held on 4 September 2021. Hari had a great start to the bout and managed to knock Wrzosek down three times with body shots before the midway point of the fight. Halfway through the second round however, Wrzosek landed a head kick which knocked Hari out, extending his winless streak to five fights.

The two of them were scheduled to face each other in an immediate rematch at Glory 80 on 19 March 2022. The fight was declared a no contest, as the bout had to be stopped after the second round due to rioting.

Hari faced Alistair Overeem on 8 October 2022, at the Glory: Collision 4. Hari lost the fight to Overeem. However, Overeem would fail a drug test which would be overturned to a No-Contest due to the use of Performance Enhancing Drugs. Hari stated that he was seriously considering officially retiring from kickboxing.

On 27 May 2023, it was announced that Hari would face James McSweeney in the main event of Glory 88 on 9 September 2023. The fight did not take place due to Hari forfeiting the fight in respect to the 2023 Marrakesh-Safi earthquake that took place in Hari's homeland.

Hari then faced Uku Jürjendal at Glory 89 on 7 October 2023. Hari lost the bout via TKO after being knocked down four times during the bout.

In February 2026, Hari confirmed the end of his active fighting career in an Instagram post, stating he is "not active anymore" and thanking his fans for the years of support.

== Personal life ==
Hari was married to Daphne Romani and has four daughters and one son. Hari and Romani got married in 2016 and divorced in 2024.

In 2007, Hari released a hip-hop song with Dutch-Moroccan rapper Appa entitled "Stap Maar In De Ring" ("Just Step Into The Ring").

Hari is friends with the Head of the Chechen Republic, Ramzan Kadyrov.

=== Legal issues ===
Aside from the sport, he has been arrested multiple times since 2006 on various assault charges.

Hari has been the subject of a number of police investigations for charges of assault and has gained a reputation for violent behavior. A psychologist who spoke to Hari in relation to one of his trials concluded that his success as an athlete and celebrity status, combined with a lack of personal guidance, has resulted in narcissistic personality traits. About his violent eruptions, Hari has said: "I am able to explode at any moment. [...] When my brakes are off, it's just one big clump of explosion, chaos and noise, and I become blind to it all. [...] A storm, a hurricane, a disaster. [...] There just is a certain aggression inside of me, of which I don't know what to do with and neither where it comes from." At his conviction on 21 February 2014, the district attorney described Hari as an individual who is very short-tempered, indulges in vulgar power display, and demonstrates aggressive and intimidating behavior which is characterized by a high "do-you-even-know-who-I-am caliber".

In late October 2012, an indictment was handed to Hari in his holding cell, which contained nine criminal charges against Hari: eight crimes of violence and one moving violation. The moving violation relates to an incident in March 2010, where a pedestrian sustained injuries. The eight crimes of violence were: attempted manslaughter of Koen Everink (who was later murdered in 2016, however without link to Badr Hari), two assaults in night club Club Air, the assault of the brother of an ex-partner in bar Cooldown, an assault in club Jimmy Woo, an assault of two people including a woman in July 2011, and the assault of a doorman in 2010. An investigation is on going. If convicted he could face up to four years in prison.

- 20 February 2010 Club Blinq. The bouncer of Club Blinq iswasassaulted by several perpetrators, one of whom was said to be Hari.
- 6 March 2010 Albert Cuyp Market. Hari frove his car into the Albert Cuyp Street, which was closed to vehicle traffic, and had an accident with a pedestrian severely injuring her leg.
- 1–29 July 2011 Spuistraat. Hari was accused of assaulting his ex-girlfriend Rosa in her apartment in Spuistraat and the destruction of her property.
- 17 July 2011 Club Air. Jeroen van de Berg, the owner of the Club Air, and an Italian guest were assaulted. Jeroen suffered serious damage to his teeth due to a kick to the head.
- 2 December 2011 Cooldown Cafe. Hari was caught on camera in "The Cooldown Cafe" assaulting Olivier, the stepbrother of his ex-girlfriend.
- 8 July 2012 Sensation White, Dutch millionaire entrepreneur Koen Everink was severely assaulted at a dance event in the Amsterdam Arena. He suffered a broken nose and eye socket and a broken ankle, which required several surgical procedures. The public prosecutor stated that numerous witnesses had pointed the finger at Hari.
- On 25 July 2012, Taken Into Custody. Hari turned himself in to the police in Amsterdam. He was taken into custody as a suspect for six cases; later his detainment was prolonged for 90 days.

In July 2012 Hari handed himself into police as he feared "being arrested by a SWAT team". Having come forth to deny his involvement in an alleged assault on businessman Koen Everink, who claimed Hari was responsible for inflicting his face and leg injuries including a broken ankle, further allegations of assault were made by an Amsterdam nightclub owner. The latter alleged that he had also been attacked by Hari, saying that he 'suffered a broken jaw and lost teeth after being kicked in the head' during an altercation at his nightclub and that in light of Everink's seeking to press charges, he would also seek to press charges.

As is procedure in the Netherlands for crimes that carry a statutory minimum four-year prison sentence or more, Hari was detained in prison whilst awaiting trial. On 9 November 2012 a court in Amsterdam decided to allow Hari to return home until his trial on the condition that he not visit any 'horeca' establishments (hotels, restaurants and café establishments), or contact witnesses, with the exception of his girlfriend Estelle Cruijff. The day following his release he was spotted violating this condition by eating out at a deli with his girlfriend Estelle Cruijff. He also made contact with two witnesses of the incident. As a result, three days after being released Hari was arrested again by police in Amsterdam and was sentenced to be detained once more, this time for three months, with his eventual release coming in January 2013.

On 21 January 2013 a court in Amsterdam determined that Hari should again be released from his pre-trial detention, this time with the condition that he could not visit catering establishments between the hours of 8:00 PM and 8:00 AM. By this point the main witnesses in the case had been heard; consequently the court deemed it unnecessary to further detain Hari. Following Hari's release he resumed training with the intention of returning to the ring. His trial was reportedly set to take place in March 2013; he faced nine charges including aggravated assault and attempted manslaughter.

On 21 February 2014 the district court in Amsterdam sentenced him to prison for 1½ years. His legal team filed an immediate appeal, as did the prosecution. However, the Court of Appeal found him guilty of aggravated assault, noting in particular that each of his assaults was preceded by a relatively mild quarrel and that to his victims his violent behaviour came as a complete surprise, leaving them no chance to defend themselves. He was sentenced to two years in prison, of which ten months suspended. Since he had already spent eight months in pre-arrest, he still had to serve half a year in prison. In addition, he has to pay his victims compensation of €45,000 in total. This judgement was upheld by the Supreme Court of the Netherlands in 2017.

Hari was reportedly arrested in Dubai following his tournament win at Global FC 3 on 29 May 2014, and he was detained and questioned by police over an alleged incident from late 2011/early 2012 before being released, according to his lawyer. Hari himself refuted the reports.

== Championships and accomplishments ==
- K-1
  - 2007-2008 K-1 Heavyweight Champion
    - One successful title defense
  - 2008 K-1 World Grand Prix runner-up
  - 2009 K-1 World Grand Prix runner-up
- It's Showtime
  - 2009-2010 It's Showtime Heavyweight Champion
    - One successful title defense
- GLORY
  - 2020 Fight of the Year vs. Benjamin Adegbuyi at Glory 76: Rotterdam
- GFC
  - 2014 Fight Series 1 Heavyweight Tournament Champion
- Muay Thai
  - 2002 WPKL Dutch Muay Thai Champion
  - 2002 The Eight Tournament Winner
  - 2003 M-1 Heavyweight Tournament runner-up

== Kickboxing record ==
Kickboxing record
106 wins (92(T)KOs), 17 losses (14 (T)KOs), 2 disqualifications), 3 no contests)
Date	Result	Opponent	Event	Location	Method	Round	Time	Record
2023-10-07	Loss	(Estonia) Uku Jürjendal	Glory 89	Burgas, Bulgaria	TKO (4 knockdowns)	2	0:47	80–17–3
2022-10-08	NC	(Netherlands) Alistair Overeem	Glory Collision 4	Arnhem, Netherlands	No contest	3	3:00	80-16-3
Originally a decision win for Overeem. Later changed to a no contest after he tested positive for performance-enhancing drugs.
2022-03-19	NC	(Poland) Arkadiusz Wrzosek	Glory 80	Hasselt, Belgium	No contest	2	3:00	80-16-2
The fight was cancelled after two rounds due to safety concerns over a riot in the audience. The bout was determined a no contest.
2021-04-09	Loss	(Poland) Arkadiusz Wrzosek	Glory 78: Rotterdam	Rotterdam, Netherlands	KO (head kick)	2	1:30	80-16-1
2020-12-19	Loss	(Romania) Benjamin Adegbuyi	Glory 76: Rotterdam	Rotterdam, Netherlands	TKO (referee stoppage)	3	0:50	80-15-1
Glory Heavyweight Championship Eliminator
2019-12-21	Loss	(Netherlands) Rico Verhoeven	Glory: Collision 2	Arnhem, Netherlands	TKO (leg injury)	3	0:59	80-14-1
2018-03-03	NC	(Netherlands) Hesdy Gerges	Glory 51: Rotterdam	Rotterdam, Netherlands	No contest	3	3:00	80-13-1
Originally a decision win for Hari. Later changed to a no contest after both fighters tested positive for performance-enhancing drugs.
2016-12-10	Loss	(Netherlands) Rico Verhoeven	Glory: Collision	Oberhausen, Germany	TKO (arm injury)	2	1:22	80-13
2015-08-22	Win	(Netherlands) Ismael Londt	Akhmat Fight Show	Grozny, Russia	TKO (straight right)	3	0:40	80-12
2014-10-16	Win	(Lithuania) Arnold Oborotov	GFC Fight Series 2	Dubai, UAE	KO (right body shot)	1	2:06	79-12
2014-05-29	Win	(Australia) Peter Graham	GFC Fight Series 1 – Heavyweight Tournament, Final	Dubai, UAE	TKO (punches)	1	1:34	78-12
Wins the GFC Fight Series 1 Heavyweight Tournament Championship.
2014-05-29	Win	(Germany) Stefan Leko	GFC Fight Series 1 – Heavyweight Tournament, Semi-finals	Dubai, UAE	KO (right cross)	1	1:38	77-12
2013-11-09	Win	(Belarus) Alexey Ignashov	Legend Fighting Show 2	Moscow, Russia	Decision (unanimous)	3	3:00	76-12
2013-05-25	Loss	(Azerbaijan) Zabit Samedov	Legend Fighting Show 1	Moscow, Russia	KO (left hook)	2	2:16	75-12
2013-03-15	Win	(Azerbaijan) Zabit Samedov	K-1 World Grand Prix FINAL in Zagreb, Quarter-finals	Zagreb, Croatia	Decision (unanimous)	3	3:00	75-11
2012-05-27	Win	(Brazil) Anderson Silva	K-1 World MAX 2012 World Championship Tournament Final 16, Super Fight	Madrid, Spain	Decision (unanimous)	3	3:00	74-11
2012-01-28	Win	(Turkey) Gökhan Saki	It's Showtime 2012 in Leeuwarden	Leeuwarden, Netherlands	TKO (referee stoppage)	1	2:44	73-11
2011-05-14	Win	(France) Gregory Tony	It's Showtime 2011 Lyon	Lyon, France	TKO (ref. stop/5 knockdowns)	1	2:43	72-11
2010-05-29	Loss	(Netherlands) Hesdy Gerges	It's Showtime 2010 Amsterdam	Amsterdam, Netherlands	DQ (kicked downed opponent)	2	0:48	71-11
Lost his It's Showtime World Heavyweight Championship.
2010-04-03	Win	(Belarus) Alexey Ignashov	K-1 World Grand Prix 2010 in Yokohama	Yokohama, Japan	Decision (unanimous)	3	3:00	71-10
2010-02-13	Win	(Tunisia) Mourad Bouzidi	It's Showtime 2010 Prague	Prague, Czech Republic	KO (right uppercut)	2	2:55	70-10
Defends his It's Showtime World Heavyweight Championship.
2009-12-05	Loss	(Netherlands) Semmy Schilt	K-1 World Grand Prix 2009 Final, Final	Yokohama, Japan	TKO (ref. stop/3 knockdowns)	1	1:48	69-10
Fight was for K-1 World Grand Prix 2009 title.
2009-12-05	Win	(Netherlands) Alistair Overeem	K-1 World Grand Prix 2009 Final, Semi-finals	Yokohama, Japan	TKO (ref. stop/2 knockdowns)	1	2:14	69-9
2009-12-05	Win	(Russia) Ruslan Karaev	K-1 World Grand Prix 2009 Final, Quarter-finals	Yokohama, Japan	KO (right hook)	1	0:38	68-9
2009-09-26	Win	(Azerbaijan) Zabit Samedov	K-1 World Grand Prix 2009 Final 16	Seoul, South Korea	KO (right body shot)	1	2:15	67-9
2009-05-16	Win	(Netherlands) Semmy Schilt	It's Showtime 2009 Amsterdam	Amsterdam, Netherlands	KO (right cross)	1	0:45	66-9
Wins the It's Showtime World Heavyweight Championship.
2009-02-08	Win	(Belgium) Frederic Sinistra	Fights at the Border presents: It's Showtime 2009	Antwerp, Belgium	KO (right cross)	1	2:06	65-9
2008-12-31	Loss	(Netherlands) Alistair Overeem	Dynamite!! 2008	Saitama, Japan	TKO (left kick)	1	2:02	64-9
2008-12-06	Loss	(Netherlands) Remy Bonjasky	K-1 World GP 2008 Final, Final	Yokohama, Japan	DQ (illegal kick)	2	0:53	64-8
Fight was for K-1 World Grand Prix 2008 title.
2008-12-06	Win	(Curaçao) Errol Zimmerman	K-1 World GP 2008 Final, Semi-finals	Yokohama, Japan	KO (right cross)	3	2:15	64-7
2008-12-06	Win	(Netherlands) Peter Aerts	K-1 World GP 2008 Final, Quarter-finals	Yokohama, Japan	TKO (referee stoppage)	2	1:39	63-7
2008-09-27	Win	(South Korea) Hong Man Choi	K-1 World Grand Prix 2008 in Seoul Final 16	Seoul, Korea	TKO (corner stoppage)	3	3:00	62-7
2008-08-09	Win	(Croatia) Domagoj Ostojic	K-1 World GP 2008 in Hawaii	Honolulu, United States	KO (left cross)	1	0:19	61-7
2008-06-29	Win	(Brazil) Glaube Feitosa	K-1 World GP 2008 in Fukuoka	Fukuoka, Japan	KO (right cross)	1	2:26	60-7
Defends the K-1 Heavyweight (−100kg) Championship.
2008-04-13	Win	(New Zealand) Ray Sefo	K-1 World GP 2008 in Yokohama	Yokohama, Japan	TKO (referee stoppage)	1	2:43	59-7
2007-12-08	Loss	(Netherlands) Remy Bonjasky	K-1 World GP 2007 Final, Quarter-finals	Yokohama, Japan	Decision (majority)	3	3:00	58-7
2007-09-29	Win	(New Zealand) Doug Viney	K-1 World GP 2007 in Seoul Final 16	Seoul, Korea	KO (right cross)	2	1:23	58-6
2007-08-05	Win	(Australia) Peter Graham	K-1 World GP 2007 in Hong Kong	Hong Kong, China	Decision (unanimous)	3	3:00	57-6
2007-04-28	Win	(Japan) Yusuke Fujimoto	K-1 World GP 2007 in Hawaii	Honolulu, United States	KO (high kick)	1	0:56	56-6
Wins the K-1 Heavyweight (−100kg) Championship.
2007-03-04	Win	(Russia) Ruslan Karaev	K-1 World GP 2007 in Yokohama	Yokohama, Japan	KO (right cross)	2	2:46	55-6
2006-12-31	Win	(Denmark) Nicholas Pettas	K-1 Premium 2006 Dynamite!!	Tokyo, Japan	TKO (arm injury)	2	1:28	54-6
2006-12-06	Win	(Poland) Paul Slowinski	K-1 World Grand Prix 2006	Tokyo, Japan	Decision (unanimous)	3	3:00	53-6
2006-09-30	Loss	(Russia) Ruslan Karaev	K-1 World Grand Prix 2006 in Osaka opening round	Osaka, Japan	KO (right punch)	1	0:52	52-6
2006-03-05	Loss	(Australia) Peter Graham	K-1 World Grand Prix 2006 in Auckland	Auckland, New Zealand	KO (rolling thunder)	3	2:54	52-5
2005-11-19	Win	(Germany) Stefan Leko	K-1 World Grand Prix 2005	Tokyo, Japan	KO (spinning right high heel kick)	2	1:30	52-4
2005-06-12	Loss	(Germany) Stefan Leko	It's Showtime 2005 Amsterdam	Amsterdam, Netherlands	KO (spinning back mid kick)	1	1:44	51-4
2005-04-16	Win	(Belarus) Vitali Akhramenko	K-1 Italy 2005 Oktagon	Milan, Italy	Decision (unanimous)	3	3:00	51-3
2005-03-11	Win	(Croatia) Domagoj Ostojic	Ultimate Nokaut 1	Karlovac, Croatia	KO (right hook)	2	0:10	50-3
2004-12-12	Win	(England) Gary Turner	Rings Fightgala "Born Invincible"	Utrecht, Netherlands	Decision (unanimous)	5	3:00	49-3
2004-10-10	Win	(Turkey) Gökhan Saki	2 Hot 2 Handle	Rotterdam, Netherlands	TKO (corner stoppage)	2	3:00	48-3
2004-05-20	Win	(Belgium) Aziz Khattou	It's Showtime 2004 Amsterdam	Amsterdam, Netherlands	KO (knees)	2	1:45	47-3
2004-03-21	Win	(Netherlands) Errol Parris	Profighters Gala in Almere	Almere, Netherlands	KO (right hook)	5	N/A	46-3
2003-09-27	Win	(Netherlands) Antoni Hardonk	Rings Fightgala	Utrecht, Netherlands	Decision (unanimous)	5	3:00	45-3
2003-06-08	Loss	(Belarus) Alexey Ignashov	It's Showtime 2003 Amsterdam	Amsterdam, Netherlands	KO (right cross)	3	2:55	44-3
2003-05-16	Loss	(Croatia) Ivan Rudan	M-1 (First World Selection)	Mestre, Italy	(T)KO (injury)	N/A	N/A	44-2
2003-05-16	Win	(Lithuania) Mindaugas Kulikauskas	M-1 (First World Selection)	Mestre, Italy	KO	2	N/A	44-1
2003-03-30	Win	(Netherlands) Dennis Strijbis	Rings Fightgala	Utrecht, Netherlands	Decision (unanimous)	5	3:00	43–1
2003-02-02	Win	(Turkey) Ahmet Lakus	Killerdome II	Amsterdam, Netherlands	TKO	4	N/A	42-1
2002-12-14	Win	(Turkey) Mutlu Karabulut	The Eight Tournament Final	Amsterdam, Netherlands	KO	2	N/A	41-1
Wins the WPKL Dutch Muay Thai Championship.
2002-12-14	Win	(Morocco) Makhloufi	The Eight Tournament Semi-final	Amsterdam, Netherlands	KO	1	N/A	40-1
2002-12-14	Win	(Netherlands) Ed Schaper	The Eight Tournament Quarter-final	Amsterdam, Netherlands	KO	1	N/A	39-1
2002-11-24	Win	(Netherlands) Karim Mrabet	Xena Sports Victory or Hell	Netherlands	Decision	3	3:00	38-1
2002-10-20	Win	(Turkey) Ahmet Lakus	Warriors Fight Night	Dordrecht, Netherlands	TKO (doctor stoppage)	5	N/A	37-1
2002-02-17	Win	(Netherlands) Willy Schneider	WPKL Gala in Hogendorphal	Amsterdam, Netherlands	TKO (doctor stoppage)	3	N/A	36-1

== See also ==
- List of male kickboxers
- List of K-1 champions
- List of It's Showtime champions
