= Mejiro Gym =

Kickboxing gym in the Netherlands

- Est.: 1978
- Founded by: Jan Plas
- Primary trainers: Jan Plas; Andre Mannaart
- Training facilities: Amsterdam, Netherlands
- Website: www.mejirogym.nl

Mejiro Gym is a kickboxing gym headquartered in Amsterdam, the Netherlands.

== History ==
Mejiro Gym was founded in 1978 by Jan Plas, a Dutch kickboxer who learned kickboxing from Kenji Kurosaki, a Japanese martial artist who founded the original Mejiro Gym in Mejiro, Tokyo. Vos Gym founder Johan Vos and FFC founder Lucien Carbin were among the founding members of Mejiro Gym Amsterdam.

With its well-known fighters including Rob Kaman and Peter Aerts, Mejiro Gym has become one of the most famous and accomplished kickboxing gyms in the world. It is regarded as one of the "big three kickboxing gyms" in Netherlands, alongside Chakuriki and Vos Gym.

Later, the Leeuwarden branch in Friesland, Netherlands was also established. In 2020, Mejiro Gym opened a new branch in Bali, Indonesia.

== Notable fighters ==
- (Netherlands) Peter Aerts
- (Netherlands) Ashwin Balrak
- (Netherlands) Remy Bonjasky
- (Netherlands) Sem Braan
- (Netherlands) Lucien Carbin
- (Turkey) Erhan Deniz
- (France) Cédric Doumbé
- (Netherlands) Michael Duut
- (Netherlands) Rodney Glunder
- (France) Brice Guidon
- (Netherlands) Rob Kaman
- (Netherlands) Andre Mannaart
- (Netherlands) Fred Royers
- (Netherlands) Bob Schrijber
- (United States) Maurice Smith
- (Netherlands) Andy Souwer

== External ==
- Official website
