= Andre Mannaart =

Dutch martial artist

- Born: November 2, 1960 (age 65); Krommenie, Netherlands
- Height: 6 ft 2 in (1.88 m)
- Weight: 189.6 lb (86.0 kg; 13.54 st)
- Division: Cruiserweight; Heavyweight
- Style: Kickboxing
- Fighting out of: Netherlands
- Team: Mejiro Gym

Kickboxing record
- Total: 82
- Wins: 58
- By knockout: 30
- Losses: 19
- Draws: 5

Mixed martial arts record
- Total: 4
- Wins: 0
- Losses: 3
- By knockout: 1
- By submission: 1
- By decision: 1
- Draws: 1

Other information
- Website: http://www.mejirogym.nl/
- Mixed martial arts record from Sherdog
- Last updated on: October 02, 2010

Andre Mannaart (born November 2, 1960) is a Dutch former kickboxer and mixed martial artist. He was four times world champion in kickboxing and Muay Thai, having fought against K-1 legends such as Ernesto Hoost, Branko Cikatić, Maurice Smith and Ray Sefo. He is now a trainer at the Mejiro Gym in Amsterdam, where he has coached fighters of the calibre of Peter Aerts and Remy Bonjasky.

On June 26, 2010, Mannaart returned to kickboxing at Fight 058 in Leeuwarden, Netherlands, where he faced old foe Jan Lomulder. After five hard rounds, Mannaart lost by decision to Jan Lomulder.

== Career titles ==
Sources:

- 1999 ISKA Kickboxing Low Kick World Champion
- 1999 WAKO Pro Cruiserweight World Champion
- 1997 WAKO Muay Thai World Light Heavyweight Champion
- 1994 WKA Kickboxing Light Heavyweight World Champion
- 1992 WKA Kickboxing Cruiserweight European Champion
- 1989 WKA Kickboxing Cruiserweight World Champion
- WPKL Muay Thai Heavyweight World Champion
- WKA Intercontinental Super Heavyweight Champion

== Kickboxing record ==
Kickboxing Record
58 wins (30 (T)KOs, 28 Decisions), 19 Losses, 5 Draws
| Date | Result | Opponent | Event | Location | Method | Round | Time |
| 2010-06-26 | Loss | (Netherlands) Jan Lomulder | Fight 058 | Leeuwarden, Netherlands | Decision | 5 | 3:00 |
| 1999-02-03 | Win | (Japan) Mitsuya Nagai | K-1 Rising Sun '99 | Tokyo, Japan | KO (Right Cross) | 2 | 1:20 |
| 1998-12-03 | Win | (Morocco) Samir Benazzouz | Night of the Superstars | Amsterdam, Netherlands | Decision | 5 | 3:00 |
| 1998-11-14 | Win | (Belgium) Marc de Wit | Muay Thai Champions League - Part III | Amsterdam, Netherlands | Decision | 5 | 3:00 |
| 1997-12-? | Loss | (Italy) Franz Haller | | Bolzano, Italy | Decision | 5 | 3:00 |
Fight was for Mannaart's WAKO World Muay Thai Light Heavyweight Championship.
| 1997-04-? | Win | (Italy) Franz Haller | Titolo Mondiale Pro. Thai-boxe pesi medio-massimi 1997 | Milan, Italy | KO | 3 | |
Wins the WAKO World Muay Thai Light Heavyweight Championship.
| 1996-04-27 | Win | (Netherlands) Luc Verheye | | Amsterdam, Netherlands | Decision | 5 | 3:00 |
| 1996-04-20 | Loss | (England) Lee Hasdell | World Oktagon Shoot Boxing Challenge '96, Final | Milan, Italy | Decision | 5 | 3:00 |
Fight was for the World Oktagon Shoot Boxing Challenge '96 Championship.
| 1996-04-20 | Win | (France) Adel Ferreira | World Oktagon Shoot Boxing Challenge '96, Semifinals | Milan, Italy | KO (Liver Shot) | 1 | |
| 1996-02-25 | Loss | (New Zealand) Ray Sefo | NZ - AUS - HOL | Auckland, New Zealand | KO (Punches) | 4 | |
Fight was for the ISKA World Super Cruiserweight Championship.
| 1995-04-02 | Loss | (Netherlands) Jan Lomulder | | Amsterdam, Netherlands | Decision | 5 | 3:00 |
| 1995-02-18 | Win | (France) Jerome Turcan | Kickboxing Mania 3 | Milan, Italy | Decision (Unanimous) | 12 | 2:00 |
Wins the ISKA World Cruiserweight Championship.
| 1994-11-12 | Loss | (Netherlands) Frank Lobman | The Night of the Sensation | Amsterdam, Netherlands | KO (Right Hook) | 4 | 2:30 |
| 1994 | Loss | (Canada) Jersey Long | ISKA Kickboxing | Montreal, Canada | TKO (Right Cross) | 7 | |
Fight was for the ISKA International Cruiserweight Championship.
| 1994-04-30 | Loss | (Croatia) Branko Cikatić | K-1 Grand Prix '94, Quarter Finals | Tokyo, Japan | KO (Right Hook) | 2 | 0:16 |
| 1994-03-04 | Win | (Japan) Toshiyuki Atokawa | K-1 Challenge | Tokyo, Japan | Decision (Unanimous) | 5 | 3:00 |
Wins the WKA World Light Heavyweight Championship.
| 1992 | Win | (Greece) Kosta Padoulitis | | Karlsruhe, Germany | TKO (Corner Stoppage) | 4 | 1:54 |
Wins the WKA European Cruiserweight Championship.
| 1991-06-29 | Loss | (United States) Maurice Smith | Thriller from Paris I | Paris, France | KO (Right Uppercut) | 2 | |
| 1991-03-23 | Loss | (Croatia) Branko Cikatić | World Kickboxing Association | Wiesbaden, Germany | Decision (Unanimous) | 12 | |
| 1990-07-? | Loss | (Netherlands) Jan Wessels | Holland vs Thailand | Amsterdam, Netherlands | KO | 7 | |
Fight was for Mannaart's WKA World Cruiserweight Championship.
| 1989-11-19 | Win | (Belgium) Mario Monaco | Kaman vs Wessels, Jaap Edenhal | Amsterdam, Netherlands | KO (Body Shot) | 2 | |
Wins the WKA World Cruiserweight Championship.
| 1989 | Win | (Netherlands) Peter Aerts | | Netherlands | KO | | |
| 1989-01-29 | Loss | (Netherlands) Peter Smit | A.J.K.F | Tokyo, Japan | Decision | 5 | 3:00 |
| 1988-11-20 | Win | (Netherlands) Ronnie Wagenmaker | | Netherlands | TKO (Corner Stoppage) | 5 | |
| 1988-05-15 | Win | (England) Kirkwood Walker | | Amsterdam, Netherlands | KO (Left High Kick) | 5 | |
| 1988-02-27 | Loss | (Netherlands) Ernesto Hoost | Superfights I | Amsterdam, Netherlands | KO | 3 | |
| 1985-10-20 | Loss | (Netherlands) Ernesto Hoost | | Amsterdam, Netherlands | Decision | 5 | 3:00 |
Legend: Win Loss Draw/No contest Notes

== Mixed martial arts record ==
Professional record breakdown
| 4 matches | 0 wins | 3 losses |
| By knockout | 0 | 1 |
| By submission | 0 | 1 |
| By decision | 0 | 1 |
| Draws | 1 | |

| Res. | Record | Opponent | Method | Event | Date | Round | Time | Location | Notes |
|---|---|---|---|---|---|---|---|---|---|
| Loss | 0-3-1 | Toon Stelling | Decision (Unanimous) | Rings Holland - Utrecht at War | June 29, 1997 | 2 | 5:00 | | |
| Loss | 0-2-1 | Kiyoshi Tamura | Submission (Rear Naked Choke) | Rings Holland - The Final Challenge | February 2, 1997 | 1 | 2:11 | | |
| Draw | 0-1-1 | Lee Hasdell | Draw | Rings_Holland:_Kings_of_Martial_Arts | February 18, 1996 | 2 | 5:00 | Amsterdam, North Holland, Netherlands | |
| Loss | 0-1 | Enson Inoue | TKO (Punches) | Shooto - Vale Tudo Junction 1 | January 20, 1996 | 1 | 3:20 | Tokyo, Japan | |
