= Zhuravlyov =

Zhuravlyov (Russian: Журавлёв) (feminine: Zhuravlyova) or Zhuravlev (feminine: Zhuravleva) is a Russian surname derived from журавль, the Russian word for crane. Notable people with the surname include:

- Alexander Zhuravlyov (born 1965), Russian military officer
- Aleksey Zhuravlyov (footballer) (born 1980), Russian footballer
- Aleksey Zhuravlyov (politician) (born 1962), Russian politician
- Anastasiya Juravleva (born 1981), Uzbekistani jumper athlete
- Boris Zhuravlyov (1946–2019), Russian footballer
- Konstantin Zhuravlyov (born 1976), Uzbekistani sprinter
- Lyudmila Zhuravleva (born 1946), Crimean astronomer
- Nikita Zhuravlyov (born 1994), Russian footballer
- Nikolai Zhuravlev (born 1976), Russian politician
- Oleksandr Zhuravlyov (born 1945), Soviet footballer
- Pavel Zhuravlyov (1887–1920), Russian partisan
- Pavel Zhuravlev (kickboxer) (born 1983), Ukrainian kickboxer and boxer
- Sergei Zhuravlyov (footballer, born 1976) (born 1976), Russian footballer
- Serhiy Zhuravlyov (1959–2025), Ukrainian footballer
- Tatiana Zhuravleva (born 1989), Russian discus thrower
- Tatyana Zhuravlyova (born 1967), Russian heptathlete
- Valentina Zhuravlyova (1933–2004), Soviet science fiction writer
- Volodymyr Zhuravlov, Ukrainian 2022 Nord Stream pipelines sabotager
- Vsevolod Zhuravlyov (born 1978), Russian footballer
- Yegor Zhuravlyov (born 1990), Russian ice hockey player
- Yevgeny Zhuravlev (1896-1983), Soviet lieutenant-general in World War II
- Yuri Zhuravlyov (footballer) (born 1996), Russian footballer
- Yuri Zhuravlyov (mathematician) (1935-2022), Soviet and Russian mathematician

== See also ==
- Zhuravlev Bay, Severnaya Zemlya, Russia
- Minor planet 26087 Zhuravleva, named after the aforementioned Lyudmila Zhuravleva
