= Dževad Poturak =

Bosnian kickboxer and martial artist (born 1977)

- Born: September 20, 1977 (age 49); Sarajevo, Bosnia and Herzegovina
- Other names: BH Machine
- Height: 1.85 m (6 ft 1 in)
- Weight: 103 kg (227 lb; 16.2 st)
- Division: Heavyweight
- Reach: 76 in (193 cm)
- Style: Kickboxing, boxing, Muay Thai
- Fighting out of: Sarajevo, Bosnia and Herzegovina
- Team: Jumruk Gym
- Years active: 2001–2013, 2014–2021

Kickboxing record
- Total: 83
- Wins: 47
- By knockout: 24
- Losses: 35
- By knockout: 11
- No contests: 1

Other information
- Notable relatives: Dženan Poturak - brother

Dževad Poturak (born September 20, 1977) is a Bosnian heavyweight kickboxer, fighting out of Jumruk Gym in Sarajevo, Bosnia and Herzegovina. He is the former WAKO Pro World Low-Kick champion and K-1 Fighting Network Prague 2007 tournament champion.

He holds notable wins over Daniel Ghiță, Melvin Manhoef, Sergei Lashchenko and Jörgen Kruth.

== Career ==
Poturak first came to prominence when he defeated Siniša Puljak to win the WKA European Championship on December 21, 2003. He then made his K-1 debut at K-1 Grand Prix BIH 2004 in June 2004, losing to Josip Bodrozic. He did not return to the promotion until April 2006 when he took part in the eight-man tournament at K-1 Italy Oktagon 2006. He was defeated in the final by Sergei Gur after beating Ricardo van den Bos and Humberto Evora.

The following year, he took part in the Grand Prixs at K-1 European League 2007 Hungary and K-1 Fighting Network Turkey 2007 but was unable to win either. In his last event of the year, on December 15, 2007, at K-1 Fighting Network Prague 2007, he was finally able to win a tournament by defeating Daniel Jerling, Duško Basrak and Roman Kleibl. He returned to defend his crown the next year at K-1 Fighting Network Prague 2008 but was knocked out by Ashwin Balrak in the quarter-finals.

On May 21, 2011, he took part in the four-man tournament at SuperKombat World Grand Prix I in Romania. He lost to Sergei Lascenko at the first stage via knock out due to a knee to the body.

On July 30, 2011, Poturak faced Alain Ngalani for the IKA Super Heavyweight World Championship in Las Vegas, Nevada, US. In the first round, Poturak knocked Ngalani to the canvas and continued to punch him on the back of his head when he was down. Originally, Ngalani was announced as the winner via disqualification. However, the decision was later overturned by the Las Vegas Sports Committee and was ruled a no contest.

He next faced Sebastian Ciobanu at the SuperKombat World Grand Prix 2012 IV on October 20, 2012, in Arad, Romania, with a wild card spot for the SuperKombat Final Elimination up for grabs. He lost via unanimous decision.

He lost a split decision to Ibrahim Aarab on November 10, 2012, in Craiova, Romania in a non-tournament bout at the SuperKombat World Grand Prix 2012 Final Elimination.

He rematched Sergei Lascenko in the reserve bout for the K-1 World Grand Prix 2012 Final in Zagreb, Croatia on March 15, 2013, and won via unanimous decision. He was then entered into the semi-finals of the competition against Ismael Londt after Badr Hari withdrew with a broken foot. He retired in round two after having his rib broken from a knee.

He lost to Igor Jurković by unanimous decision at Final Fight Championship 6 in Poreč, Croatia on June 14, 2013. Poturak announced his retirement just four days later, stating that he would have one last fight against Stefan Leko at Final Fight Championships 7 in his home town of Sarajevo on September 6, 2013.

On December 8, 2013, Poturak organised another tournament in his native Sarajevo, Bosnia and Herzegovina called No Limit K-1 rules, and he announced that this would be his last fight. He fought Mamoudou Keta in an exhibition bout. At the end of the first round, Poturak took off his gloves and retired from the sport. The fight was declared no contest.

After that, Poturak decided to return to the ring with the No Limit 7 event for the WAKO PRO World Title Low Kick +94,00 kg professional fight against world champion French kickboxer Abdarhmane Coulibaly. The event No Limit 7 was realized on 15 August 2014. Poturak beat his opponent by knockout after a rough fight.

A hand injury forced him to cancel the fight for the FFC light heavyweight championship against Champion, Pavel Zhuravlev. The fight was expected to be at FFC 27: Night of Champions on December 17, 2016, in Zagreb, Croatia.

== Championships and accomplishments ==
=== Professional kickboxing ===
- K-1
  - K-1 World Grand Prix 2012 Final 3rd place
  - 2007 K-1 Fighting Network Prague Champion
  - 2007 K-1 European League Hungary Runner-up
  - 2006 K-1 Italy Oktagon Runner-up
- WAKO Pro
  - 2014 WAKO Pro World Low Kick Champion +94.2 kg
- WKA
  - 2003 WKA European Heavyweight Championship
- KOK
  - 2019 KOK European Heavyweight Championship

== Kickboxing record ==
Kickboxing record (Incomplete)
47 wins (24 (T)KO's), 35 losses (11 (T)KO's), 1 no contest
Date	Result	Opponent	Event	Location	Method	Round	Time	Notes
Jun 4, 2021	Loss	(Romania) Ștefan Lătescu	Dynamite Fighting Show 11	Bucharest, Romania	Decision (unanimous)	3	3:00	
Oct 31, 2020	Win	(Serbia) Nikola Dimkovski	KOK Sarajevo	Bosnia and Herzegovina	TKO	1	3:00	
Nov 16, 2019	Win	(Germany) Kirill Buller	KOK'80 World Series 2019 in Lithuania	Lithuania	TKO (injury/corner stoppage)	1	3:00	
Jul 3, 2019	Win	(Albania) Dritan Barjamaj	KOK 75 World Series 2019 in Sarajevo	Bosnia and Herzegovina	TKO (corner stoppage/low kicks)	2	3:00	KOK European Heavyweight Title Fight
October 29, 2018	Loss	(Romania) Daniel Ghiță	Colosseum Tournament 9	Cluj Napoca, Romania	TKO (towel thrown/left low kicks)	1	1:38	
Jun 2, 2018	Win	(Poland) Lukasz Lipniacki	16. DSF K1 Challenge	Zabrze, Poland	Decision (unanimous)	3	3:00	
April 6, 2018	Loss	(Belarus) Alexey Ignashov	Bellator Kickboxing 9	Hungary	Decision (split)	3	3:00	
February 3, 2018	Loss	(Poland) Michal Turynski	DSF Kickboxing 13	Poland	Decision	3	3:00	For WAKO Pro World Low Kick Championship +94.2 kg.
September 16, 2017	Loss	(Slovenia) Miran Fabjan	W5 Legends Collide	Koper, Slovenia	Decision (unanimous)	3	3:00	
July 1, 2017	Loss	(Greece) Antonios Armenatzoglu	World Thai Boxing Champions Night II	Istanbul, Turkey	Decision (unanimous)	3	3:00	
April 22, 2017	Loss	(Croatia) Mladen Brestovac	FFC 29	Ljubljana, Slovenia	Decision (unanimous)	3	3:00	For The FFC Heavyweight Title.
October 8, 2016	Loss	(Morocco) Ibrahim El Bouni	W5 Grand Prix "Legends in Prague"	Prague, The Czech Republic	TKO	1	N/A	
March 11, 2016	Loss	(Poland) Michał Turyński	No Limit 8	Sarajevo, Bosnia and Herzegovina	Decision (split)	5	3:00	Lost WAKO Pro World Low Kick Championship +94.2 kg.
December 10, 2015	Loss	(France) Patrice Quarteron	Paris Fight	Paris, France	KO (elbows)	1	0:20	
October 23, 2015	Loss	(Belgium) Frédéric Sinistra	FFC 20: Zagreb	Zagreb, Croatia	Decision (unanimous)	3	3:00	
August 22, 2015	Loss	(Azerbaijan) Zabit Samedov	Akhmat Fight Show	Grozny, Chechnya, Russia	Decision (unanimous)	3	3:00	
March 13, 2015	Win	(Spain) Frank Muñoz	FFC 7: Sarajevo	Sarajevo, Bosnia and Herzegovina	Decision (unanimous)	3	3:00	Both were deducted 1 point in 2nd round for passivity. Munoz was deducted 1 point in 3rd round for punching after the break.
December 6, 2014	Win	(Greece) Theodosiadis Panagiotis	FFC 16: Vienna	Vienna, Austria	Decision (unanimous)	3	3:00	
August 15, 2014	Win	(France) Abdarhmane Coulibaly	No Limit 7	Zenica, Bosnia and Herzegovina	KO (right overhand)	2	N/A	Return from retirement. Wins WAKO Pro World Low Kick Championship +94.2 kg.
December 7, 2013	Exh.	(Belgium) Mamoudou Keta	No Limit 1	Sarajevo, Bosnia and Herzegovina	Exhibition	1	3:00	Retiring bout.
November 30, 2013	Loss	(Russia) Alexander Chernikov	Tatneft Arena World Cup 2014 1st selection 1/8 final (+91 kg)	Kazan, Russia	Decision (unanimous)	4	3:00	
June 14, 2013	Loss	(Croatia) Igor Jurković	FFC06: Jurković vs. Poturak	Poreč, Croatia	Decision (unanimous)	3	3:00	
March 15, 2013	Loss	(Suriname) Ismael Londt	K-1 World Grand Prix FINAL in Zagreb, Semifinal	Zagreb, Croatia	TKO (broken rib)	2	1:25	Semi-finals.
March 15, 2013	Win	(Ukraine) Sergei Lascenko	K-1 World Grand Prix FINAL in Zagreb, Quarterfinal	Zagreb, Croatia	Decision (unanimous)	3	3:00	Reserve fight.
November 10, 2012	Loss	(Morocco) Ibrahim Aarab	SuperKombat World Grand Prix 2012 Final Elimination	Craiova, Romania	Decision (split)	3	3:00	Super fight.
October 20, 2012	Loss	(Romania) Sebastian Ciobanu	SuperKombat World Grand Prix IV 2012	Arad, Romania	Decision (unanimous)	3	3:00	Super fight.
September 2, 2012	Win	(Slovakia) Tomáš Možný	Sarajevo Fight Night 3	Sarajevo, Bosnia and Herzegovina	Decision (split)	3	3:00	
June 30, 2012	Loss	(Romania) Daniel Ghiţă	Music Hall & BFN Group present: It's Showtime 57 & 58	Brussels, Belgium	KO (liver kick)	2	0:32	
February 25, 2012	Loss	(Netherlands) Brian Douwes	SuperKombat World Grand Prix I 2012	Podgorica, Montenegro	TKO (retirement)	3	2:15	Reserve fight.
November 12, 2011	Win	(Brazil) Ricardo Soneca	Tatneft Cup 2011 Final	Kazan, Russia	Decision (unanimous)	3	3:00	
July 30, 2011	NC	(Cameroon) Alain Ngalani	Elite Kickboxing	Las Vegas, Nevada, USA	NC	1	2:06	For IKA Super Heavyweight World Championship. Ngalani could not continue after getting knocked down with an alleged punch to the back of his head.
May 21, 2011	Loss	(Ukraine) Sergei Lascenko	SuperKombat World Grand Prix I	Bucharest, Romania	KO (knee to the body)	2	2:00	SuperKombat World Grand Prix I semi-final.
March 18, 2011	Win	(Romania) Ionuţ Iftimoaie	SuperKombat: The Pilot Show	Râmnicu Vâlcea, Romania	Decision (unanimous)	3	3:00	
October 29, 2010	Win	(Curaçao) Wendell Roche	K-1 Fight Night 2 in Sarajevo	Sarajevo, Bosnia and Herzegovina	Decision (unanimous)	3	3:00	
October 2, 2010	Win	(Morocco) Chalid Arrab	K-1 World Grand Prix 2010 in Seoul Final 16	Seoul, South Korea	TKO (corner stoppage)	3	0:06	
May 29, 2010	Loss	(Netherlands) Rico Verhoeven	It's Showtime 2010 Amsterdam	Amsterdam, Netherlands	Decision (unanimous)	3	3:00	
April 3, 2010	Loss	(Netherlands) Alistair Overeem	K-1 World Grand Prix 2010 in Yokohama	Yokohama, Japan	KO (right knee)	1	2:40	
February 13, 2010	Loss	(Romania) Daniel Ghiţă	It's Showtime 2010 Prague	Prague, Czech Republic	Decision (unanimous)	3	3:00	
October 24, 2009	Loss	(Romania) Raul Cătinaș	K-1 ColliZion 2009 Final Elimination	Arad, Romania	Decision (unanimous)	3	3:00	
July 3, 2009	Win	(Czech Republic) Petr Vondracek	K-1 ColliZion 2009 Sarajevo	Sarajevo, Bosnia and Herzegovina	Decision (unanimous)	3	3:00	
April 12, 2009	Win	(Turkey) Yuksel Ayaydin	Local Kombat 33	Oradea, Romania	Decision (unanimous)	3	3:00	
February 28, 2009	Loss	(Belarus) Alexey Ignashov	K-1 Rules Tournament 2009 in Budapest	Budapest, Hungary	Extra round decision (unanimous)	4	3:00	
December 20, 2008	Loss	(Suriname) Ashwin Balrak	K-1 Fighting Network Prague 2008	Prague, Czech Republic	TKO	2	N/A	2008 Prague Grand Prix quarter-final.
November 6, 2008	Win	(Romania) Daniel Ghiţă	Local Kombat 31	Buzău, Romania	Decision (unanimous)	3	3:00	
September 12, 2008	Win	(Romania) Raul Cătinaș	K-1 Slovakia 2008	Bratislava, Slovakia	Decision (unanimous)	3	3:00	
June 26, 2008	Win	(Brazil) Eduardo Maiorino	Planet Battle: Where Champions Collide	Hong Kong	KO (right hook)	1	1:09	
May 17, 2008	Win	(Brazil) Vitor Miranda	K-1 Fighting Network Austria 2008	Vienna, Austria	Decision	3	3:00	
December 15, 2007	Win	(Czech Republic) Roman Kleibl	K-1 Fighting Network Prague 2007	Prague, Czech Republic	KO	2	1:10	2007 Prague Grand Prix final.
December 15, 2007	Win	(Serbia) Duško Basrak	K-1 Fighting Network Prague 2007	Prague, Czech Republic	TKO	1	1:27	2007 Prague Grand Prix semi-final.
December 15, 2007	Win	(Czech Republic) Daniel Jerling	K-1 Fighting Network Prague 2007	Prague, Czech Republic	Decision (majority)	3	3:00	2007 Prague Grand Prix quarter-final.
November 2, 2007	Loss	(Brazil) Vitor Miranda	K-1 Fighting Network Turkey 2007	Istanbul, Turkey	KO (high kick)	3	2:45	2007 Turkey Grand Prix semi-final.
November 2, 2007	Win	(United Arab Emirates) Abdulmalik Gadzhiev	K-1 Fighting Network Turkey 2007	Istanbul, Turkey	KO (right hook)	1	2:58	2007 Turkey Grand Prix quarter-final.
September 7, 2007	Loss	(Belarus) Sergei Gur	Noc Bojovnikov 4	Bratislava, Slovakia	Decision	3	3:00	
February 24, 2007	Loss	(Ukraine) Maksim Neledva	K-1 European League 2007 Hungary	Budapest, Hungary	TKO	2	N/A	2007 Hungary Grand Prix final.
February 24, 2007	Win	(Hungary) Gabor Meizster	K-1 European League 2007 Hungary	Budapest, Hungary	KO (right high kick)	3	1:20	2007 Hungary Grand Prix semi-final.
February 24, 2007	Win	(Croatia) Domagoj Ostojić	K-1 European League 2007 Hungary	Budapest, Hungary	Extra round decision	4	3:00	2007 Hungary Grand Prix quarter-final.
December 16, 2006	Win	(Sweden) Jörgen Kruth	K-1 Fighting Network Prague Round '07	Prague, Czech Republic	Decision	3	3:00	
August 18, 2006	Win	(Russia) Djamal Kasumov	K-1 Hungary 2006	Debrecen, Hungary	Decision (split)	3	3:00	
April 8, 2006	Loss	(Belarus) Sergei Gur	K-1 Italy Oktagon 2006	Milan, Italy	Decision	3	3:00	2006 Italy Grand Prix final.
April 8, 2006	Win	(Portugal) Humberto Evora	K-1 Italy Oktagon 2006	Milan, Italy	KO	2	N/A	2006 Italy Grand Prix semi-final.
April 8, 2006	Win	(Netherlands) Ricardo van den Bos	K-1 Italy Oktagon 2006	Milan, Italy	Decision (unanimous)	3	3:00	2006 Italy Grand Prix quarter-final.
December 18, 2005	Win	(Sweden) Jörgen Kruth	It's Showtime 75MAX Trophy, 1st Round - Prague	Prague, Czech Republic	Decision	3	3:00	
June 14, 2005	Loss	(Serbia) Nikola Dimkovski	International Profi Tournament	N/A	Decision	3	3:00	
April 17, 2005	Loss	(Netherlands) Johnny Delgado	Gala Valkenswaard-Siam Gym	Valkenswaard, Netherlands	Decision	3	3:00	
February 13, 2005	Win	(Netherlands) Melvin Manhoef	Gala Gym Alkmaar	Alkmaar, Netherlands	KO (punches)	3	2:55	
December 11, 2004	Win	(Croatia) Gordan Jukic	Fight Night	Sarajevo, Bosnia and Herzegovina	Decision (unanimous)	5	3:00	
June 11, 2004	Loss	(Croatia) Josip Bodrozic	K-1 Grand Prix BIH 2004	Široki Brijeg, Bosnia and Herzegovina	Decision (unanimous)	3	3:00	2004 Bosnia Grand Prix quarter-final.
May 21, 2004	Win	(Slovakia) Robert Gregor	Unknown	Tuzla, Bosnia and Herzegovina	KO (right hook)	5	0:21	
December 21, 2003	Win	(Croatia) Sinisa Puljak	Unknown	Bosnia and Herzegovina	Decision (unanimous)	5	3:00	Wins WKA European Heavyweight Championship.
September 20, 2003	Win	(North Macedonia) Milan Rabrenovic	K-1 Night of Champions	Bosnia and Herzegovina	TKO (referee stoppage)	3	1:41	
August 20, 2003	Loss	(Croatia) Josip Bodrozic	King of Colosseum K-1 GP BIH 2003	Novi Travnik, Bosnia and Herzegovina	N/A	N/A	N/A	2003 Bosnia Grand Prix semi-final.
August 20, 2003	Win	(Turkey) Ergin Solmaz	King of Colosseum K-1 GP BIH 2003	Novi Travnik, Bosnia and Herzegovina	Decision (unanimous)	3	3:00	2003 Bosnia Grand Prix quarter-final.
July 7, 2003	Loss	(Hungary) Tihamer Brunner	K-1 FIGHT Makarska 2003	Makarska, Croatia	Decision (unanimous)	3	3:00	
December 27, 2002	Win	(Serbia) Nikola Dimkovski	Night of Warriors	Bosnia and Herzegovina	Decision (unanimous)	5	3:00	
Legend: Win Loss Draw/no contest

== See also ==
- List of male kickboxers
- List of K-1 events
