= Sergei Zhuravlyov =

Sergei Zhuravlyov may refer to:

- Sergei Zhuravlyov (footballer, born 1976), Russian football player
- Serhiy Zhuravlyov (born 1959), Ukrainian football player
