= Aleksey Zhuravlyov =

Aleksey Zhuravlyov may refer to:

- Aleksey Zhuravlyov (politician) (born 1962), Russian politician, head of Rodina (political party)
- Aleksey Zhuravlyov (footballer) (born 1980), Russian football player
