= 2013 in K-1 =

Mixed martial arts events

Information
- First date: February 2
- Last date: December 28

Events
- Total events: 11

Fights

Chronology
2012 in K-1	2013 in K-1	2014 in K-1

This is a list of events held in 2013 by K-1.

== K-1 Korea MAX 2013 ==
K-1 Korea MAX 2013
- Promotion: K-1; Wu Lin Feng; Khan Sportainment
- Date: Feb 2, 2013
- Venue: Olympic Park
- City: (Korea) Seoul
- Attendance: 14,370

K-1 Korea MAX 2013 was a kickboxing event promoted by the K-1 in association with the South Korean-based promotion Khan Sportainment and Chinese-based promotion Wu Lin Feng. It took place on Feb 2, 2013 at the Olympic Park in Seoul, South Korea. It was the first K-1 event held in Korea since 2010.

=== Results ===
K-1 Korea MAX 2013 Quarterfinals: K-1 Rules / 3Min. 3R Ext. 1R
(South Korea) Lee Sun-Hyun def. Shingo Ryu (Japan)
Lee defeated Ryu by 3rd round unanimous decision 3-0.
(Thailand) Jetsada Pongthong def. Kwan Woo Kim (South Korea)
Pongthong defeated Kim by 3rd round unanimous decision 3-0.
(South Korea) Wong Yong Choi def. Behzad Rafigh Doust (Iran)
Choi defeated Vizard by 3rd round unanimous decision 3-0.
(China) Zheng Zhao yu def. Woon Pyo Ha (South Korea)
Zheng defeated Woon by 3rd round unanimous decision 3-0.
K-1 Korea MAX 2013 Semifinals: K-1 Rules / 3Min. 3R Ext. 1R
(South Korea) Lee Sun-Hyun def. Zheng Zhao Yu (China)
Lee defeated Zheng by 2nd round TKO.
(Thailand) Jetsada Pongthong def. Wong Yong Choi (South Korea)
Pongthong defeated Choi by 3rd round TKO.
K-1 Korea MAX 2013 Finals: K-1 Rules / 3Min. 3R Ext. 1R
(South Korea) Lee Sun-Hyun def. Jetsada Pongthong (Thailand)
Lee defeated Pongthong by 3rd round unanimous decision 3-0 to win the K-1 Korea MAX 2013 Title.
Super fights: K-1 Rules / 3Min. 3R Ext. 1R
(Belarus) Ekaterina Vandaryeva def. Ji Won Lee (South Korea)
Vandaryeva defeated Lee by 3rd round split decision 2-1.
(South Korea) Dong Sik Yoon def. Ryo Takigawa (Japan)
Dong defeated Ryo by 1st round TKO (towel thrown).
(South Korea) Yang Rae Yoo def. Hasegawa (Japan)

== K-1 World Grand Prix FINAL in Zagreb ==
K-1 World Grand Prix FINAL in Zagreb
- Promotion: K-1
- Date: March 15, 2013
- Venue: Arena Zagreb
- City: (Croatia) Zagreb

K-1 World Grand Prix FINAL in Zagreb was a kickboxing event promoted by the K-1 promotion. It took place on March 15, 2013, in Zagreb, Croatia.

=== K-1 World Grand Prix FINAL in Zagreb Tournament bracket ===
First Round^{1}
(Romania) Cătălin Moroşanu	DEC
(Poland) Paul Slowinski	3-0
(Japan) Makoto Uehara	DEC
(Japan) Hiromi Amada	3-0
(Croatia) Mirko Cro Cop	DEC
(United States) Randy Blake	2-0
(United States) Jarrell Miller	DEC
(Lithuania) Arnold Oborotov	3-0
(Australia) Ben Edwards	TKO
(Romania) Raul Cătinaș	2nd
(Azerbaijan) Zabit Samedov	TKO
(United States) Xavier Vigney	1st
(Suriname) Ismael Londt	DEC
(India) Singh Jaideep	2-0
(Egypt) Hesdy Gerges	DEC
(Ukraine) Sergei Lascenko	3-0

Quarter Finals
(Romania) Cătălin Moroşanu	DEC
(Ukraine) Pavel Zhuravlev *	3-0
(Croatia) Mirko Cro Cop	DEC
(United States) Jarrell Miller	3-0
(Morocco) Badr Hari **	DEC
(Azerbaijan) Zabit Samedov	3-0
(Suriname) Ismael Londt	TKO
(Egypt) Hesdy Gerges	3rd

Semi Finals
(Ukraine) Pavel Zhuravlev	3-0
(Croatia) Mirko Cro Cop	DEC
(Bosnia and Herzegovina) Dževad Poturak	TKO
(Suriname) Ismael Londt	2nd

Final
(Croatia) Mirko Cro Cop	DEC
(Suriname) Ismael Londt	3-0

^{1} featured in K-1 World Grand Prix 2012 in Tokyo final 16.
* Makoto Uehara and Ben Edwards were unable to fight - their places in the Quarter Finals were taken by Pavel Zhuravlev and Badr Hari
** Badr Hari was unable to fight in the Semi Finals due to injury - his place was taken by Reserve Fight winner Dževad Poturak.

== Results ==
K-1 World Grand Prix FINAL in Zagreb

Reserve Fight: K-1 rules / 3Min. 3R Ext. 1R
(Bosnia and Herzegovina) Dževad Poturak vs. Sergei Lascenko (Ukraine)
Poturak defeated Lascenko by 3rd round unanimous decision 3-0.
Quarter finals: K-1 rules / 3Min. 3R Ext. 1R
(Romania) Cătălin Moroşanu vs. Pavel Zhuravlev (Ukraine)
Zhuravlev defeated Moroşanu by 3rd round unanimous decision 3-0.
(Croatia) Mirko Cro Cop vs. Jarrell Miller (United States)
Cro Cop defeated Miller by 3rd round unanimous decision 3-0.
(Morocco) Badr Hari vs. Zabit Samedov (Azerbaijan)
Hari defeated Samedov by 3rd round unanimous decision 3-0.
(Suriname) Ismael Londt vs. Hesdy Gerges (Egypt)
Londt defeated Gerges by 3rd round TKO.
Super Fight (1): K-1 rules / 3Min. 3R Ext. 1R
(China) Xie Chuang vs. Samo Petje (Slovenia)
Chuang defeated Petje by 3rd round unanimous decision 3-0.
Super Fight (2): K-1 rules / 3Min. 3R Ext. 1R
(Croatia) Emil Zoraj vs. Edmond Paltatzis (Greece)
Zoraj defeated Paltatzis by 2nd round KO.
Semi final (1): K-1 rules / 3Min. 3R Ext. 1R
(Ukraine) Pavel Zhuravlev vs. Mirko Cro Cop (Croatia)
Cro Cop defeated Zhuravlev by 3rd round unanimous decision 3-0.
Super Fight (3): K-1 rules / 3Min. 3R Ext. 1R
(Croatia) Toni Milanović vs. Jason Wilnis (Netherlands)
Wilnis defeated Milanović by 1st round TKO.
Semi final (2): K-1 rules / 3Min. 3R Ext. 1R
(Bosnia and Herzegovina) Dževad Poturak vs. Ismael Londt (Suriname)
Londt defeated Poturak by 2nd round TKO.
Super Fight (4): K-1 rules / 3Min. 3R Ext. 1R
(Croatia) Agron Preteni vs. Andrei Stoica (Romania)
Preteni defeated Stoica by 3rd round unanimous decision 3-0.
Super Fight (5): K-1 rules / 3Min. 3R Ext. 1R
(Croatia) Mladen Brestovac vs. Frank Muñoz (Spain)
Brestovac defeated Muñoz by 3rd round unanimous decision 3-0.
Final: K-1 rules / 3Min. 3R Ext. 1R
(Croatia) Mirko Cro Cop def. Ismael Londt (Suriname)
Cro Cop defeated Ismael by 3rd round unanimous decision 3-0.

- Xiangming Liu was replaced with Xie Chuang.
- Taishan was replaced with Frank Muñoz.
- Miran Fabjan was replaced with Giannis Sofokleus, then Sofokleus with Edmond Paltatzis.
- Makoto Uehara was replaced with Pavel Zhuravlev.
- Ben Edwards was replaced with Badr Hari.

== K-1 World MAX 2013 World Championship Tournament Final 16 ==
K-1 World MAX 2013 World Championship Tournament Final 16
- Promotion: K-1
- Date: September 14, 2013
- Venue: Palma Arena
- City: Majorca, Spain

K-1 World MAX 2013 World Championship Tournament Final 16 was a kickboxing event promoted by K-1. It took place on September 14, 2013 at the Palma Arena in Majorca, Spain.

=== Results ===
Main Card
Weight Class				Method	Round	Time	Notes
70 kg	(Thailand) Buakaw Banchamek	def.	(Spain) David Calvo	KO (Left hook to the body)	1	2:20	K-1 World MAX 2013 Final 16 bout
70 kg	(Netherlands) Andy Souwer	def.	(Japan) Yasuhiro Kido	Decision (Unanimous)	3	3:00	K-1 World MAX 2013 Final 16 bout
70 kg	(South Korea) Lee Sung-hyun	def.	(France) Charles François	Decision (Unanimous)	3	3:00	K-1 World MAX 2013 Final 16 bout
70 kg	(Germany) Enriko Kehl	def.	(Netherlands) Henri van Opstal	Decision (Unanimous)	3	3:00	K-1 World MAX 2013 Final 16 bout
70 kg	(Canada) Shane Campbell	def.	(Brazil) Wallace Lopes	KO (body kick)	1		K-1 World MAX 2013 Final 16 bout
70 kg	(Spain) Maximo Suarez	def.	(Romania) Miodrag Olar	Decision	3	3:00	K-1 World MAX 2013 Final 16 bout
70 kg	(China) Zhu Zhipeng	def.	(United States) Joey Pagliuso	Decision (Unanimous)	3	3:00	K-1 World MAX 2013 Final 16 bout
70 kg	(Senegal) Elam Ngor	def.	(Azerbaijan) Ismat Aghazade^{1}	KO (Left hook to the body)	3		K-1 World MAX 2013 Final 16 bout
70 kg	(Colombia) Christopher Mena	def.	(England) Chad Sugden	Decision (Unanimous)	3	3:00	Final 16 Reserve Fight
Heavyweight	(Spain) Frank Muñoz	def.	(Spain) Damian Garcia	Decision (Unanimous)	3	3:00	K-1 World Grand Prix 2013 Qualifier

^{1} Mike Zambidis was set to face Elam Ngor but pulled out due to contractual disagreements. He was replaced by Ismat Aghazade.

== K-1 World MAX World Championship Tournament Quarter-final in Foshan ==
K-1 World MAX World Championship Tournament Quarter-final in Foshan
- Promotion: K-1
- Date: December 28, 2013
- Venue: Lingnan Mingzhu Arena
- City: Foshan, China

K-1 World MAX World Championship Tournament Quarter-final in Foshan was a kickboxing event promoted by K-1. It took place on December 28, 2013 at the Lingnan Mingzhu Arena in Foshan, China.

=== Results ===
Main Card
Weight Class				Method	Round	Time	Notes
70 kg	(Thailand) Buakaw Banchamek	def.	(China) Zhou Zhipeng	Ext.R Decision (Unanimous)	4	3:00	K-1 World MAX 2013 Quarter Final
70 kg	(Canada) Shane Campbell	def.	(Colombia) Christopher Mena	TKO	2		K-1 World MAX 2013 Quarter Final
65 kg	(China) Kong Hongxing	def.	(Thailand) Saenchai	Ext.R Decision (Split)	4	3:00
	(China) Han Kai Hu	def.	(Thailand) Chengrob	Decision	3	3:00
	(China) Li Ning	def.	(Thailand) Suthin	TKO	3
	(China) Zhang Kai Yin	def.	(Thailand) Rachen	KO	2
	(China) Xie Lei	def.	(Philippines) Pasol	Decision	3	3:00

== See also ==
- List of K-1 events
- List of K-1 champions
