= Hesdy Gerges =

Dutch kickboxer and mixed martial arts fighter (born 1984)

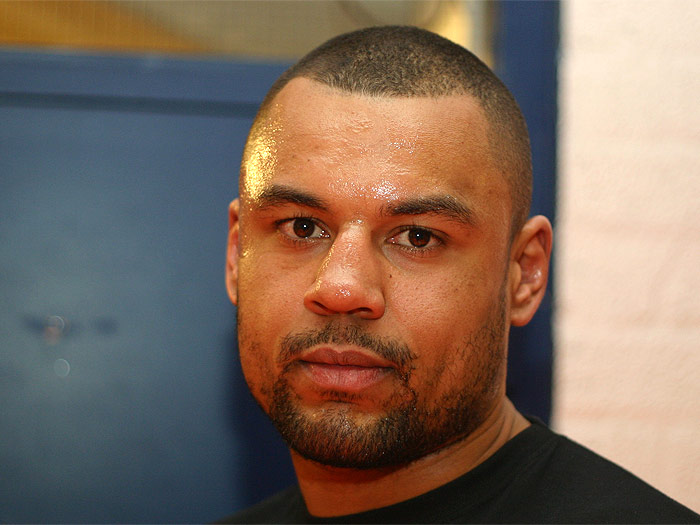
- Born: Hesdy Gerges; February 20, 1984 (age 42); Amsterdam, Netherlands
- Other names: Fighterheart
- Height: 1.99 m (6 ft 6 1/2 in)
- Weight: 108 kg (238 lb; 17.0 st)
- Division: Heavyweight
- Reach: 78 in (198 cm)
- Style: Kickboxing, Muay Thai
- Fighting out of: Amsterdam, Netherlands
- Team: Chakuriki Gym (2005–2013); Vos Gym (2013–)
- Trainer: Thom Harinck
- Years active: 2003–2022

Kickboxing record
- Total: 75
- Wins: 53
- By knockout: 26
- Losses: 22
- By knockout: 9

Mixed martial arts record
- Total: 2
- Wins: 0
- Losses: 2
- By knockout: 1
- By decision: 1

Other information
- Spouse: Denise Kielholtz
- Last updated on: October 29, 2020

Hesdy Gerges (born February 20, 1984) is a Dutch kickboxer and mixed martial artist. He held the It's Showtime World Heavyweight title between 2010 and 2012. Gerges has competed in the K-1, It's Showtime, SUPERKOMBAT and Glory promotions.

Gerges was convicted and sentenced to 54 months in prison on November 22, 2014, for a February 2011 drug-trafficking charge, but did not serve any jail time, on the condition that he would not commit a crime in Belgium in the next five years.

== Biography and career ==
Born in Amsterdam, Netherlands, Gerges began training in kickboxing in 2001. He joined the Chakuriki Gym and trained under Thom Harinck, who has also trained Badr Hari. Gerges was a notorious delinquent outside of the ring who, according to Harinck, was even worse than Badr Hari.

On October 17, 2009, at Ultimate Glory 11: A Decade of Fights in Amsterdam he defeated Ruslan Karaev by unanimous decision.

On May 29, 2010, at It's Showtime 2010 Amsterdam he won the It's Showtime Heavyweight title after being fouled by Badr Hari.

On October 2 Gerges was a fan voted fighter to fight at the K-1 Final 16 in Seoul, South Korea. He fought four-time and current champion Semmy Schilt. Although fighting very well in the 1st and 3rd round against the much favored Schilt Gerges lost by Majority decision. Because he was only two points away from a draw and had battered the legs of Schilt like no other fighter had ever managed to do before he was chosen to fight at the finals on December 11, 2010, in a reserve fight against Yusuke Fujimoto. This was Fujimoto's retirement match and Gerges won by TKO (3 knockdowns).

However, in 2011 Gerges was not over impressive in his performances, despite going 2–1 by beating Daniel Ghiță and Chris Knowles. He lost to Rico Verhoeven by a narrow split decision in a superfight at the SUPERKOMBAT Fight Club.

On January 28, 2012, he lost to Ghiță in the rematch, by first-round knockout. As a result, he lost his Showtime Heavyweight Title.

He faced Sergei Lascenko at the K-1 World Grand Prix 2012 in Tokyo final 16 on October 14, 2012. He was able to block the majority of Lascenko's punches while battering the Ukrainian with low kicks, and took the unanimous decision victory.

He faced Carter Williams in a non-tournament bout at the SUPERKOMBAT World Grand Prix 2012 Final in Bucharest, Romania on December 22, 2012, and won by a third-round knockout.

At the K-1 World Grand Prix FINAL in Zagreb on March 15, 2013, in Zagreb, Croatia, he faced Ismael Londt in the quarter-finals and bowed out from a broken nose in round three after receiving a flying knee from Londt.

He defeated Pavel Zhuravlev by unanimous decision at Final Fight Championship 6 in Poreč, Croatia on June 14, 2013.

He joined Glory in July 2013.

He lost to Errol Zimmerman by third-round TKO in the tournament reserve match at Glory 11: Chicago - Heavyweight World Championship Tournament in Hoffman Estates, Illinois, United States on October 12, 2013.

He defeated Ewerton Teixeira by unanimous decision at Glory 13: Tokyo - Welterweight World Championship Tournament in Tokyo, Japan on December 21, 2013.

He defeated Jhonata Diniz via second-round TKO at Glory 15: Istanbul in Istanbul, Turkey on April 12, 2014.

Gerges won via disqualification when he was attacked while downed by Jamal Ben Saddik just seconds into their bout at Qabala Fight Series #1 in Qabala, Azerbaijan on June 29, 2014.

In June 2018, Gerges announced that he had signed a multi-fight deal with Bellator and that he would compete both as a Bellator mixed martial artist and kickboxer.

Gerges will make his kickboxing return during Enfusion 98, when he will face Mohamed El Bouchaibi. Gerges defeated El Bouchaibi by a first-round TKO due to low kicks.

Gerges fought Rico Verhoeven in the semifinals of a four-man heavyweight tournament held at Glory 77, and lost by unanimous decision.

== Personal life ==
Gerges was born in Amsterdam, Netherlands to a Dutch mother and a Surinamese father. He was raised by his Egyptian stepfather. He is married to women's MMA fighter Denise Kielholtz.

=== Drug-trafficking conviction ===
On February 15, 2011, Gerges was arrested in Amsterdam under suspicion of being part of a drug deal involving 128 kg (282 lb) of cocaine.

His half-brother was arrested May 2010 in a warehouse in Belgium that contained 128 kg of cocaine. Gerges was already out of the picture in the investigation of 2010, but for some reason the investigation had stalled and he was put back in the picture on February 15, 2011. No cocaine or weapons were found in the residence. His trainer, Thom Harinck, spoke with the Dutch Metro News on February 21, and outright said, "Hesdy has been framed. He wakes up at 7:30, at 10:00am he trains with me, rests in the afternoon, then in the evening does strength and conditioning and is in bed by 10:00 PM. I cannot imagine that he still would have time for things like this."

On February 25, 2011, Gerges was released by Belgium police.

At the beginning of May 2011, Gerges was extradited to Belgium to be dealt with as the Belgian authorities suspected that the trafficking ring was going through Belgium. On May 13, 2011, he was released again and stays with his claim that he is 100% innocent." At a later trial Gerges was convicted and sentenced to 54 months in prison for drug-trafficking, but didn't have to do any jail time on the condition that he wouldn't commit a crime in Belgium over the next five years.

=== Doping suspension ===
On April 20, 2019, it was announced that Gerges had failed a drug test prior to Glory 51: Rotterdam. He was issued with an official reprimand. Badr Hari, who faced Gerges at the event, also failed the drug test and was issued with a 19-month suspension after tests on samples provided indicated a violation of Doping Autoriteit Netherlands rules regarding prohibited substances for competitive athletes.

== Titles ==
- It's Showtime
  - 2010 It's Showtime World Heavyweight Champion
- Kunlun Fight
  - 2015 Kunlun Fight +100kg World Championship Tournament runner up
- World Full Contact Association
  - 2009 W.F.C.A. World Super Heavyweight Champion
  - 2008 W.F.C.A. European Super Heavyweight Champion
  - 2008 W.F.C.A. Benelux Super Heavyweight Champion
  - 2007 W.F.C.A. Dutch Super Heavyweight Champion
- World Independent Promotor's Union
  - 2016 W.I.P.U. "King of the Ring" Super Heavyweight Champion

== Kickboxing record ==
Kickboxing record
53 wins (26 (T)KO's, 25 decisions, 2 disqualifications), 20 losses, 1 draw, 1 no contest
Date	Result	Opponent	Event	Location	Method	Round	Time
2022-10-29	Loss	(Netherlands) Rico Verhoeven	HIT IT	Rotterdam, Netherlands	TKO (punches)	5	1:58
2021-01-30	Loss	(Netherlands) Rico Verhoeven	Glory 77: Rotterdam Semi Final	Rotterdam, Netherlands	Decision (unanimous)	3	3:00
2020-10-3	Win	(Belgium) Mohamed El Bouchaibi	Enfusion 98	Alkmaar, Netherlands	TKO (low kicks)	1	1:58
2018-03-03	NC	(Morocco) Badr Hari	Glory 51: Rotterdam	Rotterdam, Netherlands	No contest	3	3:00
Originally a decision win for Hari. Later changed to a No Contest after both fighters tested positive for performance-enhancing drugs.
2017-09-30	Loss	(Croatia) Mladen Brestovac	Glory 45: Amsterdam	Amsterdam, Netherlands	KO (left high kick)	1	0:36
2017-05-20	Win	(Czech Republic) Tomáš Hron	Glory 41: Holland	Den Bosch, Netherlands	Decision (unanimous)	3	3:00
2016-11-05	Loss	(Romania) Benjamin Adegbuyi	Glory 35: Nice, Semi Finals	Nice, France	Decision (unanimous)	3	3:00
2016-09-09	Loss	(Brazil) Guto Inocente	Glory 33: New Jersey	Trenton, New Jersey	Decision (split)	3	3:00
2016-06-25	Loss	(Suriname) Ismael Londt	Glory 31: Amsterdam	Amsterdam, Netherlands	Decision (split)	3	3:00
2016-04-24	Win	(France) Grégory Tony	It's Hardcore Time Again 2	Meppen, Germany	TKO (retirement)	1	3:00
Wins The Kings Of The Ring World K-1 Rules Super Heavyweight Title (+96.600 kg).
2015-06-07	Loss	(Suriname) Jahfarr Wilnis	Kunlun Fight 26 - Super Heavyweight Tournament, Final	Chongqing, China	Ext. R. decision (unanimous)	4	3:00
For the Kunlun Fight Super Heavyweight Tournament.
2015-06-07	Win	(Belarus) Andrey Gerasimchuk	Kunlun Fight 26 - Super Heavyweight Tournament, Semi Finals	Chongqing, China	Decision (split)	3	3:00
2015-03-17	Win	(Latvia) Konstantin Gluhov	Kunlun Fight 21 - Super Heavyweight Tournament, Quarter Finals	Sanya, China	TKO (low kicks)	3	0:35
2015-02-01	Win	(Belarus) Igor Bugaenko	Kunlun Fight 18: The Return of the King - Super Heavyweight Tournament, Final 16	Guangzhou, China	TKO (low kicks)	2	
2014-11-07	Loss	(Romania) Benjamin Adegbuyi	Glory 18: Oklahoma	Shawnee, Oklahoma, USA	Decision (unanimous)	3	3:00
Glory Heavyweight Title eliminator.
2014-06-29	Win	(Morocco) Jamal Ben Saddik	Qabala Fight Series #1	Qabala, Azerbaijan	DQ (attack on a downed opponent)	1	0:20
2014-04-12	Win	(Brazil) Jhonata Diniz	Glory 15: Istanbul	Istanbul, Turkey	TKO (corner stoppage)	2	3:00
2013-12-21	Win	(Brazil) Ewerton Teixeira	Glory 13: Tokyo	Tokyo, Japan	Decision (unanimous)	3	3:00
2013-10-12	Loss	(Curaçao) Errol Zimmerman	Glory 11: Chicago - Heavyweight World Championship Tournament, Reserve Fight	Hoffman Estates, Illinois, USA	TKO (right hook)	3	0:38
2013-06-14	Win	(Ukraine) Pavel Zhuravlev	FFC06: Jurković vs. Poturak	Poreč, Croatia	Decision (unanimous)	3	3:00
2013-03-15	Loss	(Suriname) Ismael Londt	K-1 World Grand Prix FINAL in Zagreb, Quarter Finals	Zagreb, Croatia	TKO (broken nose)	3	1:42
2012-12-22	Win	(United States) Carter Williams	SUPERKOMBAT World Grand Prix 2012 Final	Bucharest, Romania	KO (left knee)	3	
2012-10-14	Win	(Ukraine) Sergei Lascenko	K-1 World Grand Prix 2012 in Tokyo final 16, First Round	Tokyo, Japan	Decision (unanimous)	3	3:00
2012-06-30	Loss	(Netherlands) Rico Verhoeven	Music Hall & BFN Group present: It's Showtime 57 & 58	Brussels, Belgium	Decision (unanimous)	3	3:00
2012-01-28	Loss	(Romania) Daniel Ghiţă	It's Showtime 2012 in Leeuwarden	Leeuwarden, Netherlands	KO (left hook)	1	2:47
Loses It's Showtime World Heavyweight title.
2011-11-17	Loss	(Netherlands) Rico Verhoeven	SUPERKOMBAT Fight Club	Oradea, Romania	Decision (split)	3	3:00
2011-05-21	Win	(England) Chris Knowles	Fightclub presents: It's Showtime 2011	Amsterdam, Netherlands	KO (punches)	2	0:46
2011-03-06	Win	(Romania) Daniel Ghiţă	It's Showtime Sporthallen Zuid	Amsterdam, Netherlands	Decision (unanimous)	3	3:00
2010-12-11	Win	(Japan) Yusuke Fujimoto	K-1 World Grand Prix 2010 Final	Tokyo, Japan	TKO (three knockdown rule)	1	1:41
2010-10-02	Loss	(Netherlands) Semmy Schilt	K-1 World Grand Prix 2010 in Seoul Final 16	Seoul, South Korea	Decision (majority)	3	3:00
2010-09-12	Win	(Albania) Rustemi Kreshnik	Fightingstars presents: It's Showtime 2010	Amsterdam, Netherlands	TKO (low kicks)	2	2:33
2010-05-29	Win	(Morocco) Badr Hari	It's Showtime 2010 Amsterdam	Amsterdam, Netherlands	Disqualification	2	
Wins It's Showtime World Heavyweight title.
2010-03-13	Loss	(France) Brice Guidon	Oktagon presents: It's Showtime 2010	Milan, Italy	Ext.R decision	4	3:00
2010-02-27	Win	(Suriname) Ashwin Balrak	Amsterdam Fightclub presents: Amsterdam vs Rotterdam	Amsterdam, Netherlands	Decision (unanimous)	3	3:00
2010-01-09	Win	(Poland) Paul Slowinski	Ring Sensation Championship: Uprising 12	Rotterdam, Netherlands	Decision (unanimous)	3	3:00
2009-12-12	Win	(Belgium) Sebastian van Thielen	Backstreet Fights II	Cologne, Germany	KO	2	
2009-10-17	Win	(Russia) Ruslan Karaev	Ultimate Glory 11: A Decade of Fights	Amsterdam, Netherlands	Decision (unanimous)	3	3:00
Wins WFCA World (K-1 rules) Super Heavyweight (+95 kg) title.
2009-05-31	Win	(Palestine) Mo Boubkari	Next Generation Warriors	Utrecht, Netherlands	TKO (referee stoppage)	2	1:28
2009-03-28	Loss	(Netherlands) Semmy Schilt	K-1 World Grand Prix 2009 in Yokohama	Yokohama, Japan	Decision (unanimous)	3	3:00
2009-03-21	Loss	(Brazil) Anderson Silva	VIP Fight Night 2009	Neuss, Germany	TKO (doctor stoppage/leg injury)	1	2:28
Fight was for VIP Fight Night 2009 tournament title.
2009-03-21	Win	(Germany) Kevin Klinger	VIP Fight Night 2009	Neuss, Germany	TKO (injury)	1	0:00
2009-03-21	Win	(Germany) Aytac Yahsi	VIP Fight Night 2009	Neuss, Germany	Decision (unanimous)	3	3:00
2009-03-08	Win	(Netherlands) Brian Douwes	Beatdown	Amsterdam, Netherlands	Decision (unanimous)	3	3:00
2008-11-08	Win	(Czech Republic) Jan Muller	Ice Cold Assassins		Decision	5	3:00
Wins WFCA European and retains Benelux Heavyweight title.
2008-10-05	Win	(Netherlands) Jerrel Venetiaan	Tough Is Not Enough	Rotterdam, Netherlands	Decision (split)	3	3:00
2008-09-21	Win	(Turkey) Mutlu Karabulut	SLAMM Events presents "Back to the Old School"	Amsterdam, Netherlands	Decision (unanimous)	3	3:00
Wins WFCA Benelux Heavyweight title.
2008-07-05	Win	(Netherlands) Ricardo van den Bos	Amsterdam Fightclub	Amsterdam, Netherlands	Decision (unanimous)	3	3:00
Retains WFCA Dutch Thaiboxing Super Heavyweight (+95 kg) title.
2008-02-17	Loss	(Tunisia) Mourad Bouzidi	K-1 MAX Netherlands 2008 The Final Qualification	Utrecht, Netherlands	Decision (unanimous)	3	3:00
2007-09-23	Win	(Curaçao) Wendell Roche	Rings Holland: Risky Business	Utrecht, Netherlands	Decision (unanimous)	3	3:00
2007-06-02	Win	(Netherlands) Bob van Boxmeer	Gentleman Fight Night 2007	Tilburg, Netherlands	TKO (doctor stoppage/injury)	1	3:00
Wins WFCA Dutch Thaiboxing Super Heavyweight (+95 kg) title.
2007-06-02	Win	(Palestine) Mo Boubkari	Next Generation Warriors	Tilburg, Netherlands	Decision (unanimous)	3	3:00
2007-03-12	Loss	(Suriname) Ginty Vrede	Rings "The Chosen Ones"	Utrecht, Netherlands	TKO (referee stoppage)	1	
2006-09-17	Draw	(Netherlands) Rick van Soest	Rings Kickboxing Gala in Amsterveen	Amstelveen, Netherlands	Decision	3	3:00
2006-06-02	Loss	(Italy) Daniele Petroni	The King of Kings II	Milan, Italy	Decision (unanimous)	5	3:00
Fight was WAKO-Pro Thai/Kickboxing (+96 kg) World title.
2006-05-27	Win	(Netherlands) Roy Dijkshoorn	Muay Thai Gala in Zonnehuis	Amsterdam, Netherlands	KO	1	
2006-04-22	Win	(Turkey) Errol Turgut	Gala in Amsterdam	Amsterdam, Netherlands	Decision (unanimous)	5	2:00
2006-03-18	Win	(Belgium) Nordin Zourdani	Beatdown II	Amsterdam, Netherlands	Decision (unanimous)	5	2:00
2006-02-12	Win	(Egypt) Amir el Alfi	Powerzone	Amsterdam, Netherlands	TKO		
2005-12-18	Win	(Netherlands) Marcel van Bekkum	Gala in Zonnehuis	Amsterdam, Netherlands	KO		
2004-10-24	Loss	(Netherlands) Brian Douwes	Fight Gala in Beverwijk	Beverwijk, Netherlands	KO	2	
2004-09-18	Win	(Netherlands) Rein Zijlstra	Gala in Zilvermeeuwen	Amsterdam, Netherlands	KO	1	
2003-12-12	Win	(Netherlands) Ricardo van Kooten	Kamakura Team Muay Thai Gala	Katwijk, Netherlands	Decision	3	2:00
2003-10-25	Loss	(Netherlands) Jerrel Blankers	Gala in Zonnehuis	Amsterdam, Netherlands	TKO (referee stoppage)		
Legend: Win Loss Draw/no contest Notes

== Mixed martial arts record ==
Professional record breakdown
2 matches	0 wins	2 losses
By knockout	0	1
By decision	0	1

Res.	Record	Opponent	Method	Event	Date	Round	Time	Location	Notes
Loss	0–2	Dragos Zubco	Decision (unanimous)	Bellator 230	October 12, 2019	3	5:00	Milan, Italy	
Loss	0–1	Domingos Barros	TKO (punches)	Bellator 211	December 1, 2018	1	3:52	Genoa, Italy	

== See also ==
- List of male kickboxers
