= Sergei Lashchenko =

Ukrainian kickboxer (1987–2015)

Sergei Lascenko
- Born: 21 July 1987; Pavlohrad, Ukrainian SSR, Soviet Union
- Died: 8 April 2015 (aged 27); Odesa, Ukraine
- Native name: Сергей Лащенко
- Other names: Ukrainian Tough Guy
- Nationality: Ukrainian
- Height: 1.91 m (6 ft 3 in)
- Weight: 126 kg (278 lb; 19 st 12 lb)
- Division: Heavyweight
- Style: Kickboxing, Muay Thai
- Stance: Orthodox
- Team: Captain Odesa; Mike's Gym; Chakuriki Gym
- Trainer: Pavel Evtushenko; Mike Passenier; Thom Harinck
- Years active: 2006–2014

Kickboxing record
- Total: 47
- Wins: 33
- By knockout: 15
- Losses: 14
- By knockout: 3
- Last updated on: October 17, 2014

Serhiy Lashchenko (Ukrainian: Сергій Лащенко; 21 June 1987 – 8 April 2015), also spelled as Sergii Lashchenko and Sergei Lascenko, was a Ukrainian kickboxer. He was a K-1 and Superkombat Heavyweight.

Lashchenko won the Superkombat Tournament Championship at SUPERKOMBAT World Grand Prix 2011 Final, stopping Ismael Londt with punches to the head in the first round and becoming the first Superkombat World Grand Prix champion in the process.

In his prime he was considered one of the best heavyweight kickboxers in the world, with a career-high ranking at #6 in the world in the LiverKick.com rankings.

== Career ==
=== 2006-2008 ===
Lascenko began his kickboxing career in 2006, mostly fighting under Muay Thai rules. After becoming the Ukrainian Heavyweight Muay Thai Champion in 2007, he went on to win The Honor of Soldier tournament in Moscow, Russia later that year. The tournament kicked off on October 10, 2007, with sixteen competitors. In the opening round, Lascenko beat Sultan Babaev by unanimous decision to qualify for the final eight on December 5. There, he dispatched Andrei Kirsanov via split decision in the quarter-finals, and Yaroslav Zakharov by technical knockout in the semis before taking an extra round unanimous decision over Alexander Oleynik in the final.

On October 27, 2008, he defeated Stepan Kirlish to win the +91 kg gold medal at the 8th Ukrainian Muay Thai Cup.

He made his K-1 debut on November 22, 2008, at the K-1 World Grand Prix 2008 in Riga. He was eliminated from the eight-man tournament at the first stage by Mindaugas Sakalauskas on unanimous decision (10-9, 10–9, 10–9) after an extra round.

=== 2009 ===
On April 13, 2009, Lascenko once again won the +91 kg gold medal at the Ukrainian Muay Thai Championships.

Following this, he entered the IFMA European Amateur Muay Thai Championships in Liepāja, Latvia. He beat Alexei Kudin by decision in the semi-finals on May 20 and Igors Goncarovs by TKO in the final on May 22. Just a day later, he participated in his second K-1 tournament, the K-1 World Grand Prix 2009 in Łódź, in Poland. He made it to the final but lost by knockout to Zabit Samedov, after he had beaten Noel Cadet by TKO and Dmitrij Bezus in the quarters and semis, respectively.

He was given another chance to qualify for the 2009 K-1 World Grand Prix final 16 when he was invited to the K-1 World Grand Prix 2009 in Tokyo final 16 Qualifying GP in Japan. In the quarter-finals of the tournament, Lascenko faced Sebastian Ciobanu and was able to take a unanimous decision (30-29, 30–28, 30–28) over the Romanian. In the semis, he knocked out Brice Guidon in round two after dropping him with a knee strike to the body in the first. Advancing to the final, he came up against Daniel Ghiţă who stopped him with low kicks inside the first round.

He rebound from this loss by beating Dmitrij Bezus to take the +91 kg gold medal at the 8th Ukrainian Muay Thai Cup on September 21, 2009.

=== 2010 ===
In 2010, Lascenko and his teammate Artur Kyshenko left the Captain Odesa gym in Ukraine to move to the famed Mike's Gym in Amsterdam, Netherlands.

On April 3, 2010, Lascenko defeated Takumi Sato by unanimous decision (30-29, 30–29, 30–28) at the K-1 World Grand Prix 2010 in Yokohama.

After this, he was invited to compete in the tournament on K-1 World Grand Prix 2010 in Bucharest on May 21, 2010. He was unable to make it past the first stage, as Freddy Kemayo beat him by unanimous decision in the quarter-finals.

He would also go on to lose his next two fights after this, dropping decisions to Alexei Kudin on July 30 in Minsk, Belarus, and Ismael Londt on October 22 in Kazan, Russia. He ended the year with a first-round knockout win over Vasile Popovici in Chişinău, Moldova on December 11.

=== 2011 ===
On May 21, 2011, he took part in the SuperKombat World Grand Prix I 2011 in Bucharest, Romania. It would be the first of four, four-man qualifying tournaments held throughout the year; the winners of the four events would qualify for another four-man Grand Prix at the end of the year to determine the overall champion. In the semi-finals, he stopped Dževad Poturak with a knee to the body in round two, and in the final he KO'd Roman Kleibl with a right hook, also in the second round. This win qualified him for the finals at the end of the year.

Lascenko was expected to face Rico Verhoeven at the K-1 World Grand Prix 2011 in Nanjing Final 16 on October 29. However, the event was cancelled with K-1 experiencing severe financial problems.

The SuperKombat World Grand Prix Final 2011 was held in Darmstadt, Germany on November 19. In the semis, he defeated Erhan Deniz (who he had already beaten back in 2008) via doctor stoppage in round 3. He then advanced into the final against Ismael Londt, the man who had beaten him a year previously. It looked as though the result would be the same this time also as Londt forced Lascenko into the corner and dropped him with a flurry of punches. Lascenko beat the count but was put against the ropes again and, initially, looked overwhelmed. However, Lascenko then dramatically KO'd Londt. With his back against the ropes, he let go his own punch furry and hit Londt with three punches to the head, knocking him out and becoming the first SuperKombat World Grand Prix champion in the process.

=== 2012 ===
He faced Hesdy Gerges at the K-1 World Grand Prix 2012 in Tokyo final 16 on October 14, 2012. Lascenko was unable to land punches while Gerges battered him with low kicks, and lost via unanimous decision.

He was scheduled to have his rubber match with Ismael Londt on November 10, 2012, in Craiova, Romania at the SuperKombat World Grand Prix 2012 Final Elimination, which is the quarter-finals of the SuperKombat World Grand Prix 2012. However, he was forced to pull out of the bout due to injuries sustained in his fight with Gerges and replaced by Daniel Sam. Strangely enough, though, he was then added back to the card to fight Benjamin Adegbuyi, replacing Alexey Ignashov. He was floored twice by Adegbuyi in round one, causing the referee to stop the bout.

He rematched Freddy Kemayo in a tournament reserve bout at the SuperKombat World Grand Prix 2012 Final in Bucharest, Romania on December 22, 2012, and lost via split decision after three rounds.

He rematched Dževad Poturak in the reserve bout for the K-1 World Grand Prix 2012 Final in Zagreb, Croatia on March 15, 2013, and lost via unanimous decision.

He snapped a four-fight losing streak by taking a unanimous decision win over Tomasz Nowak at the K-1 World Grand Prix 2013 in Moldova - Light Heavyweight Tournament in Chișinău, Moldova on March 30, 2013.

=== 2013 ===
He was scheduled to fight Antonio Sousa on April 13, 2013, in the K-1 World Qualification - K-1 World MAX Elimination super fight but was pulled out because of K-1 financial problems.

== Death ==
Lascenko was pronounced dead on April 8, 2015, at the Odesa Jewish Hospital in Ukraine after being shot multiple times. According to the Press Service of the Ministry of Interior of the Odesa Oblast, Lascenko was shot in the carotid artery in Odesa during the Deribasovskaya Street night shooting. According to initial information, the cause of quarrel was a woman and generated a conflict between Odesa citizens and a group of eight Caucasians. He was survived by a wife and an 11-month old child - Platon.

== Titles ==
=== Amateur ===
- International Federation of Muaythai Amateurs
  - 2008 Busan TAFISA World Games IFMA Amateur Muay Thai +91 kg bronze medalist (bronze)
  - 2009 IFMA European Amateur Muay Thai Championships +91 kg gold medalist (gold)
- Ukrainian Muay Thai Championships
  - 2009 Ukrainian Muay Thai Championships +91 kg gold medalist (gold)
- Ukrainian Muay Thai Cup
  - 7th Ukrainian Muay Thai Cup +91 kg gold medalist (gold) (2007)
  - 8th Ukrainian Muay Thai Cup +91 kg gold medalist (gold) (2008)

=== Professional ===
- The Honor of Soldier
  - 2007 Honor of Soldier heavyweight tournament winner
- K-1
  - 2009 K-1 World Grand Prix in Łódź finalist
  - 2009 K-1 World Grand Prix in Tokyo final 16 Qualifying GP finalist
- SUPERKOMBAT Fighting Championship
  - 2011 SUPERKOMBAT World Grand Prix Final Tournament Winner
  - 2011 SUPERKOMBAT World Grand Prix I Tournament Winner
  - 2011 Special Prize
  - First SUPERKOMBAT World Grand Prix Champion
- KOK
  - 2014 KOK World GP 2014 Heavyweight Tournament Champion

== Fight record ==
Professional Kickboxing and Muay Thai record
33 Wins (15 (T) KO's, 18 decisions), 14 Losses
Date	Result	Opponent	Event	Location	Method	Round	Time
2014-10-17	Win	(Poland) Tomasz Szepkowski	KOK World GP 2014 in Gdańsk, Final	Gdańsk, Poland	KO	1	
Won KOK World GP 2014 Heavyweight Tournament title.
2014-10-17	Win	(Poland) Michal Turynski	KOK World GP 2014 in Gdańsk, Semi Finals	Gdańsk, Poland	Ext. R. Decision (Unanimous)	4	3:00
2014-06-06	Win	(Greece) Dimitris Delis	FFC13: Jurković vs. Tavares	Zadar, Croatia	TKO (Towel Thrown)	2	1:40
2013-05-10	Loss	(Croatia) Mladen Brestovac	FFC04: Perak vs. Joni	Zadar, Croatia	Decision (Unanimous)	3	3:00
2013-03-30	Win	(Poland) Tomasz Nowak	K-1 World Grand Prix 2013 in Moldova - Light Heavyweight Tournament	Chișinău, Moldova	Decision (Unanimous)	3	3:00
2013-03-15	Loss	(Bosnia and Herzegovina) Dževad Poturak	K-1 World Grand Prix FINAL in Zagreb, Reserve Fight	Zagreb, Croatia	Decision (unanimous)	3	3:00
2012-12-22	Loss	(France) Freddy Kemayo	SUPERKOMBAT World Grand Prix 2012 Final, Reserve Bout	Bucharest, Romania	Decision (Split)	3	3:00
2012-11-10	Loss	(Romania) Benjamin Adegbuyi	SUPERKOMBAT World Grand Prix 2012 Final Elimination, Quarter Finals	Craiova, Romania	TKO (Referee Stoppage)	1	2:12
2012-10-14	Loss	(Netherlands) Hesdy Gerges	K-1 World Grand Prix 2012 in Tokyo final 16, First Round	Tokyo, Japan	Decision (Unanimous)	3	3:00
2012-07-21	Win	(Spain) Damian Garcia	It's Showtime 59	Tenerife, Spain	KO	1	
2012-05-27	Win	(Netherlands) Rico Verhoeven	K-1 World MAX 2012 World Championship Tournament Final 16, Super Fight	Madrid, Spain	Extra round decision (split)	4	3:00
2012-05-12	Win	(Morocco) Salah Edine Kandoussi	Siam Gym Belgium presents It's Showtime 56	Kortrijk, Belgium 3	KO (Punches)		
2012-03-10	Loss	(Romania) Daniel Ghiţă	Cro Cop Final Fight	Zagreb, Croatia	KO (Right High Kick)	3	0:49
2011-11-19	Win	(Suriname) Ismael Londt	SUPERKOMBAT World Grand Prix 2011 Final, Final	Darmstadt, Germany	KO (punches)	1	2:04
Wins SUPERKOMBAT World Grand Prix Final tournament title.
2011-11-19	Win	(Turkey) Erhan Deniz	SUPERKOMBAT World Grand Prix 2011 Final, Semi Finals	Darmstadt, Germany	TKO (doctor stoppage)	3	0:53
2011-05-21	Win	(Czech Republic) Roman Kleibl	SUPERKOMBAT World Grand Prix I 2011, Final	Bucharest, Romania	KO (right hook)	2	2:14
Wins SUPERKOMBAT World Grand Prix I tournament title.
2011-05-21	Win	(Bosnia and Herzegovina) Dževad Poturak	SUPERKOMBAT World Grand Prix I 2011, Semi Finals	Bucharest, Romania	KO (right knee to the body)	2	2:00
2010-12-11	Win	(Romania) Vasile Popovici	KOK World GP 2010 in Chisinau	Chişinău, Moldova	KO	1	1:52
2010-10-22	Loss	(Suriname) Ismael Londt	Tatneft Arena World Cup 2010 final (+91 kg)	Kazan, Russia	Decision (unanimous)	3	3:00
2010-07-29	Loss	(Suriname) Ashwin Balrak	Tatneft Cup 2010	Kazan, Russia	Decision (Unanimous)	3	3:00
2010-07-03	Loss	(Belarus) Alexei Kudin	Fight Club "The Octopus"	Minsk, Belarus	Decision (unanimous)	3	3:00
2010-05-21	Loss	(France) Freddy Kemayo	K-1 World Grand Prix 2010 in Bucharest, Quarter Final	Bucharest, Romania	Decision (unanimous)	3	3:00
2010-04-03	Win	(Japan) Takumi Sato	K-1 World Grand Prix 2010 in Yokohama	Yokohama, Japan	Decision (unanimous)	3	3:00
2009-10-23	Win	(Belarus) Igor Bugaenko	Tatneft Arena European Cup 2009	Kazan, Russia	Decision (unanimous)	5	3:00
2009-08-11	Loss	(Romania) Daniel Ghiţă	K-1 World Grand Prix 2009 in Tokyo final 16 Qualifying GP, Final	Tokyo, Japan	KO (right low kick)	1	2:19
For K-1 World Grand Prix Final 16 Qualifying GP tournament title.
2009-08-11	Win	(France) Brice Guidon	K-1 World Grand Prix 2009 in Tokyo final 16 Qualifying GP, Semi Finals	Tokyo, Japan	KO (right cross)	2	0:34
2009-08-11	Win	(Romania) Sebastian Ciobanu	K-1 World Grand Prix 2009 in Tokyo final 16 Qualifying GP, Quarter Finals	Tokyo, Japan	Decision (unanimous)	3	3:00
2009-05-23	Loss	(Azerbaijan) Zabit Samedov	K-1 World Grand Prix 2009 in Łódź, Final	Łódź, Poland	TKO (referee stoppage)	3	2:05
For K-1 World Grand Prix 2009 in Łódź tournament title.
2009-05-23	Win	(Ukraine) Dmytro Bezus	K-1 World Grand Prix 2009 in Łódź, Semi Finals	Łódź, Poland	TKO (referee stoppage)	1	2:29
2009-05-23	Win	(France) Noel Cadet	K-1 World Grand Prix 2009 in Łódź, Quarter Finals	Łódź, Poland	TKO (referee stoppage)	1	2:46
2009-02-19	Loss	(Russia) Vladimir Mineev	Tatneft Cup 2009 4th selection for 1/8 final	Kazan, Russia	Decision	3	3:00
2008-12-17	Loss	(Ukraine) Pavel Zhuravlev	Warrior's Honor-3 Quarter Final	Kharkiv, Ukraine	Decision	3	3:00
2008-11-22	Loss	(Lithuania) Mindaugas Sakalauskas	K-1 World Grand Prix 2008 in Riga, Quarter Finals	Riga, Latvia	Extra round decision (unanimous)	4	3:00
2008-05-29	Loss	(Belarus) Alexei Kudin	WBKF World Tournament (+93 kg) @ Club Arbat, semi finals	Moscow, Russia	Decision (unanimous)	3	3:00
2007-12-21	Win	(Ukraine) Oleksandr Oliynyk	The Honor of Soldier tournament	Kharkiv, Ukraine	Extra round decision (unanimous)	4	3:00
Wins The Honor of Soldier tournament title.
2007-12-12	Win	(Russia) Yaroslav Zakharov	WBKF championship (+93 kg) 1/2 final @ Club Arbat	Moscow, Russia	TKO	5	
2007-12-05	Win	(Russia) Andrei Kirsanov	WBKF championship (+93 kg) 1/4 final @ Club Arbat	Moscow, Russia	Decision (split)	5	3:00
2007-10-10	Win	(Russia) Sultan Babaev	WBKF championship (+93 kg) Elimination @ Club Arbat	Moscow, Russia	Decision (unanimous)	5	3:00
2007-04-04	Win	(Russia) Denis Podolyachin	WBKF (+93 kg) @ Club Arbat	Moscow, Russia	Decision (unanimous)	5	3:00
Legend: Win Loss Draw/No contest Notes

Amateur Muay Thai record
Date	Result	Opponent	Event	Location	Method	Round	Time
2009-09-21	Win	(Ukraine) Dmytro Bezus	9th Ukrainian Muaythai Cup	Poltava, Ukraine			
Wins 9th Ukrainian Muaythai Cup (+91kg) gold medal.
2009-05-22	Win	(Latvia) Igors Goncarovs	IFMA European Amateur Muaythai championships	Liepāja, Latvia	TKO (referee stoppage)	3	
Wins IFMA European Amateur Muaythai championships (+91kg) gold medal.
2009-05-20	Win	(Belarus) Alexei Kudin	IFMA European Amateur Muaythai championships	Liepāja, Latvia	Decision	4	2:00
2009-04-13	Win	(Ukraine) Dmytro Bezus	Ukrainian Muaythai championships 2009	Odesa, Ukraine			
Wins Ukrainian Muaythai championships 2009 (+91kg) gold medal.
2008-10-27	Win	(Ukraine) Stepan Kirlish	8th Ukrainian Muaythai Cup	Mariupol, Ukraine			
Wins 8th Ukrainian Muaythai Cup (+91kg) gold medal.
2008-09-30	Loss	(Belarus) Alexei Kudin	4th Busan TAFISA World Games	Busan, South Korea	Decision	5	3:00
2008-09-28	Win	(Turkey) Erhan Deniz	4th Busan TAFISA World Games	Busan, South Korea	TKO (referee stoppage)	3	
2008-08-04	Win	(Ukraine) Dmytro Bezus	1st Stage of Ukrainian Muaythai Cup 2008	Mykolaiv, Ukraine			
Legend: Win Loss Draw/No contest Notes

== See also ==
- List of male kickboxers
