= Ismael Londt =

Surinamese-Dutch kickboxer (born 1985)

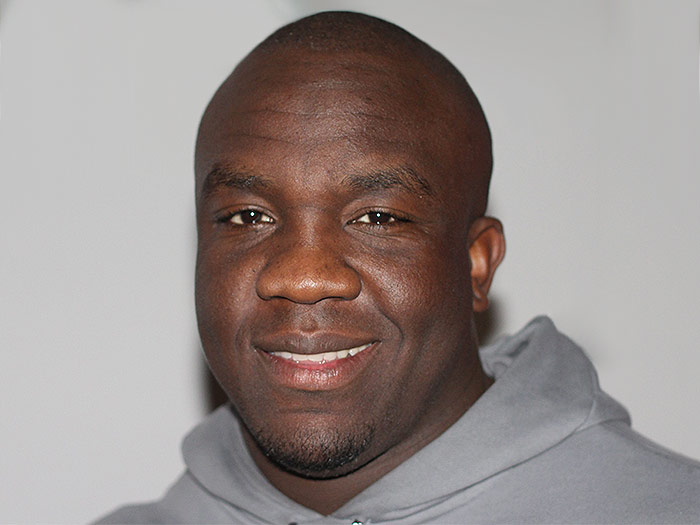
- Born: 12 July 1985 (age 41); Rotterdam, Netherlands
- Other names: Mr. Pain
- Height: 1.94 m (6 ft 4 1/2 in)
- Weight: 123.8 kg (273 lb; 19 st 7 lb)
- Division: Heavyweight
- Reach: 78.0 in (198 cm)
- Style: Kickboxing
- Stance: Orthodox
- Team: ARJ Trainingen
- Trainer: Maikel Polanen

Kickboxing record
- Total: 54
- Wins: 43
- By knockout: 20
- Losses: 10
- By knockout: 4
- Draws: 1

Other information
- Website: http://ismaellondt.com
- Last updated on: 23 September 2015

Ismael Londt (born 12 July 1985) is a Surinamese-Dutch kickboxer.

He is the former SUPERKOMBAT Heavyweight Champion, and two time SUPERKOMBAT Grand Prix Heavyweight tournament winner.

He was ranked as a top ten heavyweight by Combat Press between December 2019 and January 2021. He was also ranked by Combat Press in the heavyweight top ten between May 2016 and May 2018.

== Kickboxing career ==
=== SUPERKOMBAT ===
Londt participated in the 2011 SUPERKOMBAT Heavyweight Grand Prix II. In the semifinals, he knocked Sebastian Ciobanu out in the third round, with a left hook. In the finals, he fought Mladen Brestovac, and won by a first round TKO.

He took part in the 2011 SUPERKOMBAT Heavyweight World Grand Prix as well. He faced Pavel Zhuravlev in the semifinals. The fight went into an extra round, after which Londt won a split decision. He lost the final bout against Sergei Lascenko by a first round KO.

In 2012, he fought Freddy Kemayo for the SUPERKOMBAT Heavyweight title. Londt won a split decision.

He was scheduled to have his rubber match with Sergei Lascenko on 10 November 2012 in Craiova, Romania at the SUPERKOMBAT World Grand Prix 2012 Final Elimination, in the tournament. However, Lascenko was forced to pull out of the bout due to injuries sustained in his previous bout and replaced by Daniel Sam. Londt won by TKO in round one when the doctor stopped Sam from continuing due to a swollen eye.

He rematched Sebastian Ciobanu in the semi-finals at the SUPERKOMBAT World Grand Prix 2012 Final on 22 December in Bucharest, and won by TKO due to a cut in round two. In the final, he lost a unanimous decision to Pavel Zhuravlev after an extension round as he finished as runner-up for the second year in a row.

=== K-1 ===
Londt faced Singh Jaideep at the K-1 World Grand Prix 2012 in Tokyo final 16 on 14 October and won via majority decision.

At the K-1 World Grand Prix FINAL in Zagreb on 15 March 2013 in Zagreb, Croatia, he faced Hesdy Gerges in the quarter-finals and won by TKO in round three after breaking Gerges' nose with a flying knee. In the semis, he went up against Dževad Poturak, who was filling in for an injured Badr Hari, and won by another knee TKO when he broke Poturak's rib in round two. He lost to Mirko Cro Cop in the tournament final, dropped with a left high kick in round two before losing a unanimous decision.

Some controversy later emerged, as Londt, and the rest of the Grand Prix participants would never receive their compensation. K-1 was supposed to pay Londt €300 000.

He lost to Benjamin Adegbuyi by unanimous decision at Slamm!! Soema Na Basi IV in Paramaribo, Suriname on 8 August 2013. He was expected to fight Badr Hari at the A1 World Combat Cup in Eindhoven, Netherlands on 17 May 2014. The fight was cancelled.

He was expected to defend his SUPERKOMBAT Heavyweight Title against Cătălin Moroșanu at the SUPERKOMBAT World Grand Prix IV 2014 in Almere, Netherlands on 27 September 2014. However, he pulled out once again this time due to undisclosed reasons.

=== Glory ===
He was signed for Glory 29: Copenhagen in February 2016.

Londt was immediately placed in the 2016 Glory Heavyweight Contender tournament. He won a majority decision against Anderson Silva in the semifinals, and won a split decision against Jahfarr Wilnis in the finals.

Londt next fought a rematch with Hesdy Gerges during Glory 31: Amsterdam. Both fighters were deducted a point for excessive clinching in the third round. Londt would go on to win a split decision.

Ismale Londt fought Jamal Ben Saddik during Glory: Collision. Ben Saddik won a unanimous decision. Londt lost his next fight with Glory as well, losing a unanimous decision to D'Angelo Marshall.

Moving away from Glory, Londt fought in the 2017 Mix Fight Heavyweight tournament. He defeated Enver Sljivar by KO in the semifinals, and James McSweeney by TKO in the finals.

=== ONE Championship ===
In May 2020, Londt signed a contract with ONE Championship. He was booked to make his promotional debut against the 2018 Kunlun Fight Heavyweight tournament winner Iraj Azizpour at ONE: Lights Out on 11 March 2022. After coming out strong in the first round, Londt lost the fight by second-round knockout.

== Titles and accomplishments ==
- 2019 Mix Fight Heavyweight Tournament Winner
- 2016 Glory Heavyweight Contender Tournament Winner
- First SUPERKOMBAT Heavyweight Champion
- 2013 K-1 World Grand Prix FINAL in Zagreb Runner-up
- 2012 SUPERKOMBAT World Grand Prix Runner-up
- 2012 SUPERKOMBAT Heavyweight Champion
- 2011 SUPERKOMBAT World Grand Prix Runner-up
- 2011 SUPERKOMBAT World Grand Prix II Champion
- 2010 IPTA K-1 Rules World Champion +95 kg

== Kickboxing record ==
Kickboxing record
43 Wins (20 (T) KO's), 10 Losses (4 (T)KO's, 3 Decisions), 1 Draw
Date	Result	Opponent	Event	Location	Method	Round	Time
2022-03-11	Loss	(Iran) Iraj Azizpour	ONE: Lights Out	Kallang, Singapore	KO (Punches)	2	2:01
2019-12-07	Win	(United Kingdom) James McSweeney	Mix Fight 27 Heavyweight Tournament, Final	Frankfurt, Germany	TKO (Doctor stoppage)	1	N/A
Wins the Mix Fight 27 Heavyweight Tournament
2019-12-07	Win	(Bosnia and Herzegovina) Enver Sljivar	Mix Fight 27 Heavyweight Tournament, Semi Final	Frankfurt, Germany	KO (Right punch)	1	N/A
2017-12-09	Loss	(Curaçao) D'Angelo Marshall	Glory 49: Rotterdam	Rotterdam, Netherlands	Decision (Unanimous)	3	3:00
2016-12-10	Loss	(Morocco) Jamal Ben Saddik	Glory: Collision	Oberhausen, Germany	Decision (Unanimous)	3	3:00
2016-06-25	Win	(Netherlands) Hesdy Gerges	Glory 31: Amsterdam	Amsterdam, Netherlands	Decision (Split)	3	3:00
2016-04-16	Win	(Netherlands) Jahfarr Wilnis	Glory 29: Copenhagen - Heavyweight Contender Tournament, Final	Copenhagen, Denmark	Decision (Split)	3	3:00
Wins the Glory Heavyweight Contender Tournament.
2016-04-16	Win	(Brazil) Anderson Silva	Glory 29: Copenhagen - Heavyweight Contender Tournament, Semi Finals	Copenhagen, Denmark	Decision (Majority)	3	3:00
2015-08-22	Loss	(Morocco) Badr Hari	Akhmat Fight Show	Grozny, Russia	TKO (Straight right)	3	0:42
2015-05-16	Win	(Albania) Rustemi Kreshnik	A1 World Combat Cup	Eindhoven, Netherlands	TKO (Referee stoppage)	1	N/A
2015-04-19	Win	(Czech Republic) Michal Janáček	The Best of all Elements	Almere, Netherlands	TKO (Right high kick)	2	N/A
2015-03-21	Win	(Georgia (country)) Giga Kukhalashvili	A1 World Combat Cup	Tbilisi, Georgia	KO (Flying knee)	1	00:24
2013-09-28	Win	(Belgium) Sebastien van Thielen	A1 World Combat Cup: Event of the Year	Eindhoven, Netherlands	Decision (Unanimous)	3	3:00
2013-08-08	Loss	(Romania) Benjamin Adegbuyi	Slamm!! Soema Na Basi IV	Paramaribo, Suriname	Decision (Unanimous)	3	3:00
2013-03-15	Loss	(Croatia) Mirko Cro Cop	K-1 World Grand Prix FINAL in Zagreb, Final	Zagreb, Croatia	Decision (Unanimous)	3	3:00
For the K-1 World Grand Prix FINAL in Zagreb title.
2013-03-15	Win	(Bosnia and Herzegovina) Dževad Poturak	K-1 World Grand Prix FINAL in Zagreb, Semi Finals	Zagreb, Croatia	TKO (Broken rib)	2	1:25
2013-03-15	Win	(Netherlands) Hesdy Gerges	K-1 World Grand Prix FINAL in Zagreb, Quarter Finals	Zagreb, Croatia	TKO (Broken nose)	3	1:42
2012-12-22	Lose	(Ukraine) Pavel Zhuravlev	SUPERKOMBAT World Grand Prix 2012 Final, Final	Bucharest, Romania	Decision (Unanimous)	4	3:00
For the 2012 SUPERKOMBAT World Grand Prix title.
2012-12-22	Win	(Romania) Sebastian Ciobanu	SUPERKOMBAT World Grand Prix 2012 Final, Semi Finals	Bucharest, Romania	TKO (Doctor stoppage)	2	N/A
2012-11-10	Win	(United Kingdom) Daniel Sam	SUPERKOMBAT World Grand Prix 2012 Final Eliminatiom, Quarter Finals	Craiova, Romania	TKO (Doctor stoppage/Eye injury)	1	N/A
2012-10-14	Win	(India) Singh Jaideep	K-1 World Grand Prix 2012 in Tokyo final 16, First Round	Tokyo, Japan	Decision (Majority)	3	3:00
2012-07-07	Win	(France) Freddy Kemayo	SUPERKOMBAT World Grand Prix III 2012	Varna, Bulgaria	Decision (Split)	3	3:00
Wins the vacant SUPERKOMBAT Heavyweight Championship.
2012-02-25	Win	(Germany) Vladimir Toktasynov	SUPERKOMBAT World Grand Prix I 2012	Podgorica, Montenegro	TKO (Referee stoppage)	1	0:48
2011-11-19	Loss	(Ukraine) Sergei Lascenko	SUPERKOMBAT World Grand Prix 2011 Final, Final	Darmstadt, Germany	KO (Punches)	1	2:04
For the 2011 SUPERKOMBAT World Grand Prix title.
2011-11-19	Win	(Ukraine) Pavel Zhuravlev	SUPERKOMBAT World Grand Prix 2011 Final, Semi Finals	Darmstadt, Germany	Ext R. Decision (Split)	4	3:00
2011-10-23	Win	(Tunisia) Mourad Bouzidi	Muay Thai Mania 4	Rijswijk, Netherlands	KO (Uppercut)	2	N/A
2011-08-26	Win	(Netherlands) Reamon Welboren	SLAMM! Events: Super Suri Thaiboxing Cup	Paramaribo, Suriname	Decision	N/A	N/A
2011-07-16	Win	(Croatia) Mladen Brestovac	SUPERKOMBAT World Grand Prix II 2011, Final	Constanța, Romania	TKO (Referee stoppage)	1	0:55
Wins SuperKombat World Grand Prix II tournament title.
2011-07-16	Win	(Romania) Sebastian Ciobanu	SUPERKOMBAT World Grand Prix II 2011, Semi Finals	Constanța, Romania	KO (Left hook)	3	0:37
2011-06-30	Win	(Czech Republic) Tomas Hron	N/A	Prague, Czech Republic	Decision (Unaniomus)	3	3:00
2011-06-05	Win	(Russia) Vladimir Toktasynov	Memento Mori II	Rotterdam, Netherlands	KO	1	N/A
2010-12-23	Win	(Suriname) Roger Pinas	Klaar om te Bosse	Paramaribo, Suriname	KO	N/A	N/A
2010-12-04	Win	(Italy) Alex Rossi	Janus Fight Night 2010	Padua, Italia	KO	2	N/A
2010-10-20	Win	(Ukraine) Sergei Lascenko	Tatneft Arena World Cup 2010 final (+91 kg)	Kazan, Russia	Decision (Unanimous)	3	3:00
2010-09-05	Win	(Germany) Asmir Burgic	Human's Fight Night IV	Hamburg, Germany	KO	3	N/A
Wins IPTA K-1 Rules World Championship +95 kg.
2010-05-13	Win	(Ukraine) Tsotne Rogava	Tatneft Arena World Cup 2010 2nd selection 1/4 final (+91 kg)	Kazan, Russia	Ext R. Decision (Unanimous)	4	3:00
2010-05-08	Loss	(Angola) Henriques Zowa	Fight Masters	Almere, Netherlands	TKO	N/A	N/A
2010-04-10	Win	(Netherlands) Patrick Schmitt	Almere's Finest	Almere, Netherlands	TKO	1	N/A
2010-03-21	Draw	(Montenegro) Goran Radonjic	K-1 World MAX 2010 West Europe Tournament	Utrecht, Netherlands	Draw	3	3:00
2010-02-10	Win	(Bulgaria) Todor Todorov	Tatneft Arena World Cup 2010 3rd selection 1/8 final (+91 kg)	Kazan, Russia	KO	1	2:30
2009-12-23	Win	(Netherlands) Jan Siersema	Slamm!! in Suriname "The Return Fighters presents Klaar om te Bossen"	Paramaribo, Suriname	KO	1	N/A
2009-11-29	Win	(Netherlands) Brian Douwes	SLAMM "Nederland vs Thailand VI"	Almere, Netherlands	Decision (Unanimous)	5	3:00
2009-06-13	Win	(Netherlands) Rico Verhoeven	Gentlemen Promotions	Tilburg, Netherlands	Decision (Unanimous)	3	3:00
2009-05-09	Win	(Spain) Frank Muñoz	SLAMM Catalonia vs Netherlands	Barcelona, Spain	Decision	3	3:00
2009-01-29	Loss	(France) Nicolas Wamba	Champions League, Semi Finals	Lisbon, Portugal	Decision (Split)	3	3:00
2008-05-18	Win	(Morocco) Yassin Bensalem	Masters of the Ring, Zonnehuis	Amsterdam, Netherlands	Decision (Unanimous)	3	2:00
Legend: Win Loss Draw/No contest Notes

== See also ==
- List of K-1 events
- SLAMM!! Events
- List of male kickboxers
