= Daniel Ghiță =

Romanian kickboxer and politician

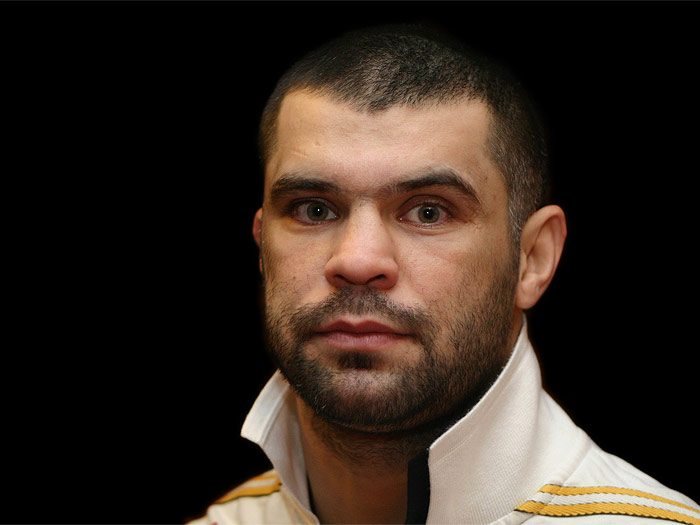
- Ghiță in 2011
- Born: Daniel Ghiță; 22 April 1981 (age 45); Bucharest, Romania
- Nickname: The Savage Samurai
- Height: 1.95 m (6 ft 5 in)
- Weight: 255 lb (116 kg; 18 st 3 lb)
- Division: Heavyweight
- Reach: 77 in (196 cm)
- Style: Muay Thai
- Trainer: Anil Dubar (head coach)
- Years active: 1999–2019

Kickboxing record
- Total: 63
- Wins: 52
- By knockout: 42
- Losses: 11
- By knockout: 3
- Last updated on: March 29, 2019

Daniel Ghiță (Romanian pronunciation: [daniˈel ˈɡit͡sə], born 22 April 1981) is a Romanian politician and former kickboxer, who serves as a member of the Chamber of Deputies of Romania since December 2020.

Ghiță is the former It's Showtime heavyweight champion. He formerly competed in Glory, and was the runner up of the Glory Heavyweight Grand Slam tournament. He also competed for the Japanese K-1 promotion, where he made his name in their 2009 and 2010 World Grand Prix seasons.

Ghiță is one of the biggest stars in kickboxing history known for throwing powerful low kicks. He was also known for his enormous left hook. Daniel Ghiță was often referred to as the “Savage Samurai”. He was widely considered one of the greatest kickboxers.

He was ranked No. 1 heavyweight in the world in 2014. Between 2012 and 2015, he was at least a Top 2 heavyweight in the world. In January 2016, he was dropped from the rankings due to his unofficial retirement. Ghiță returned to the ring in October 2018 at Colosseum Tournament 9, when he defeated Dževad Poturak by technical knockout.

== Biography ==
Ghiţă was born on 22 April 1981. Aside from kickboxing, from 2001 to 2008, Ghiță worked as a (SPP) agent assigned to protect the Romanian President.

== Kickboxing career ==
=== Early career ===
"The Savage Samurai" made his debut in the World Muay Thai Championships in 1999 in Bangkok, Thailand. Daniel won all his matches by knockout before the semifinal, where he lost against Alexey Ignashov by one round (the only match the Belarusian won by decision and not KO).

Ghiță's career continued with success: he won the European Muay Thai champion in Germany in 2000, bronze medal at the World Muay Thai Championships in Thailand in 2001 and European Muay Thai runner-up in Portugal in 2002. In 2003, he recorded the fastest KO at the World Muay Thai Championships in Thailand, 30 seconds against an Australian fighter.

=== K-1 debut ===
In 2004, Ghiță entered the Local Kombat fighting circuit in Romania. His good record there gave him the opportunity to fight also in the K-1 fighting circuit. His K-1 debut was in 2007 at K-1 Fighting Network Romania 2007 against Nobu Hayashi.

On 11 August 2009 Ghiță broke Peter Aerts' record of fastest K-1 tournament win by defeating all three of his opponents in a total of 5 minutes and 15 seconds. Peter Aerts' record at that time was 6:43 and stood for 10 years before Ghiță's milestone, however, Aerts' record was set at a K-1 Grand Prix Final Round, whereas Ghiță's record was set in a qualifying GP.

In October 2010, Daniel Ghiță became the first Romanian fighter to qualify for the K-1 World Grand Prix Final in Tokyo, defeating Errol Zimmerman by KO in the last qualifying tournament in Seoul. At the tournament he fought Gokhan Saki in the quarterfinals. He lost the fight by decision after an extra round.

=== First world title shot ===
On 6 March 2011 Daniel Ghiță faced the Chakuriki fighter Hesdy Gerges and the current It's Showtime Heavyweight champion in Amsterdam. Ghiță was a slight underdog as Gerges almost beat Semmy Schilt the previous year and gave Badr Hari trouble in their fight. Though from the first round Ghiță scored effective shots, until the second round where a knee that skimmed his groin was ruled wrongly an 8 count. He lost the fight by unanimous decision a fight that many people thought Ghiță won.

Ghiță was scheduled to face Polish-Australian fighter Paul Slowinski at the It's Showtime 2011 Lyon, but his opponent pulled out and was replaced by Fikri Ameziane. Expectedly, Ghiță beat his opponent in the first round.

=== It's Showtime World title win ===
On 28 January 2012 at It's Showtime in Leeuwarden, Ghiță rematched Hesdy Gerges for the It's Showtime Heavyweight World title. After backing up Gerges to the neutral corner in the first round he knocked Hesdy out with a left hook and won his biggest world title to date in the process.

On 10 March 2012, it was Sergei Lascenko's turn to be defeated by the Savage Samurai via third-round TKO (head kick) at Mirko Filipović's Final Fight in Zagreb, Croatia.

On 12 May the Romanian beat Brian Douwes at It's Showtime 56 in the second round (2:16) by KO with a single counter left hook. His punch sent the Dutchman to the canvas thus adding another KO win to his record.

At the It's Showtime 2012 Brussels, he scored his 7th straight win by KO with a 2nd round liver kick of his Bosnian opponent Dževad Poturak. In his previous fight at the K-1 World Grand Prix in Madrid, Ghiță fought Wendell Roche until his corner threw in the towel in round two.

Although he was expected to fight in the 2012 K-1 World Grand Prix, Daniel was left out of the tournament.

=== Glory World Series ===
Ghiță then signed with rival kickboxing promotion, Glory.

He was set to face Fabiano Cyclone in the first round of the 2012 Glory Heavyweight Grand Slam at Glory 4: Tokyo - 2012 Heavyweight Grand Slam in Saitama, Japan on 31 December 2012. However, Cyclone pulled out of the bout and was replaced by his fellow countryman Jhonata Diniz. He defeated Diniz by unanimous decision after two, two-minute rounds due to the tournament's "best of three" format and advanced to the quarter-finals to face Mourad Bouzidi. After a close opening round, Ghiță stopped Bouzidi in the second round with a kick which injured his arm. In the semifinals, he came up against Jamal Ben Saddik, and dispatched of him within seconds, with a single kick to the body. An anticipated rematch with Semmy Schilt awaited him in the final, and, after a slow start to the three-minute first round, the Dutchman sent Ghiță to the canvas with a left high kick. Despite seemingly recovering from the blow, referee Joop Ubeda called a halt to the contest, giving Schilt the TKO win. He received a $100,000 check as the runner up on the tournament.

Ghiță rematched Gökhan Saki at Glory 6: Istanbul in Istanbul, Turkey on 6 April 2013 in a #1 contender's bout for the Glory Heavyweight Championship held by Semmy Schilt. The fight started out a little rough, as Saki caught a kick from the Romanian. He then backed Ghiță up and threw him to the mat with an illegal sweep according to the Glory rules. Ghiță landed hard, looking to have suffered an arm injury. Referee Joop Ubeda wrongly counted it as a down as Ghiță took a while to get to his feet. Even though injured, round two saw again a more consistent Ghiță but midway through the round, the Turk began landing heavy punches on him, dropping the Romanian thrice to take a win via TKO after the referee stepped in, calling the fight.

He halted his two-fight losing streak with a first-round knockout of Brice Guidon at Glory 9: New York - 2013 95kg Slam in New York City, New York, USA on 22 June 2013. He hurt Guidon with kicks and punches to the body, forcing him into the corner. As the Frenchman covered up, Ghiță ended the fight with a left hook when Guidon tried to punch his way out.

In the semi-finals of Glory 11: Chicago - Heavyweight World Championship Tournament in Hoffman Estates, Illinois, United States in October 2013, Ghiță stopped Anderson "Braddock" Silva with a first round body kick. Meeting Rico Verhoeven in the final, he suffered a unanimous decision defeat.

He rematched Errol Zimmerman at Glory 13: Tokyo - Welterweight World Championship Tournament in Tokyo, Japan on 21 December 2013 and knocked Zimmerman out for the second time, hurting him just seconds into the match and keeping up the pressure before putting him away with his left hook at the 0:35 mark of round one.

He rematched Rico Verhoeven in a bout for the vacant Glory Heavyweight (+95 kg/209 lb) Championship at Glory 17: Los Angeles in Inglewood, California, US on 21 June 2014, losing a unanimous decision.

=== Return ===
Ghiță returned to the ring at 2017 World Wushu Championships, winning the bronze medal after semifinal's defeat on points to the 5-time world champion Hamid Reza Gholipour of Iran.

On 29 October 2018, he made his kickboxing return at Colosseum Tournament IX at the BT Arena in Cluj-Napoca, Romania. Ghiță defeated Dževad Poturak in the first round, after Poturak's corner threw in the towel in the first round. Poturak later revealed that his quadriceps muscle was torn during the fight.

He was scheduled to fight Petr Vondráček during Colosseum Tournament 11. Ghiță won the fight in the first round by a left hook KO.

== Politics ==
In November 2015, Ghiță joined the United Romania Party (PRU), that being the kickboxing world champion's first involvement with Romanian politics. He left the party in June 2016, after a disagreement with the party president Bogdan Diaconu, who he claimed didn't follow the principles he promoted.

In October 2020, Ghiță joined the Social Democratic Party (PSD), to run for the Chamber of Deputies of Romania in the next legislative elections. He won a seat in the Chamber on PSD's party list as aftermath of the elections.

== Acting ==
Ghiță appeared in the music video for the song "Cât poți tu de tare" by B.U.G. Mafia, which was released in December 2010.

== Personal life ==
He supports UNICEF charities.

== Titles ==
- Professional:
  - 2013 Glory Heavyweight World Championship Tournament runner-up
  - 2012 Glory Heavyweight Grand Slam Tournament runner-up
  - 2012 It's Showtime World Heavyweight Champion
  - 2009 K-1 World Grand Prix 2009 in Tokyo Final 16 Qualifying GP winner
  - 2005 World Kickboxing Network (W.K.N.) European Thai Boxing champion -96,600 kg
- Amateur:
  - 2017 World Wushu Championships +90 kg/+198 lb Sanshou bronze medalist (bronze)
  - 2002 International Amateur Muay Thai Federation (IAMTF) European Championships in Caldas da Rainha, Portugal (silver)
  - 2001 International Amateur Muay Thai Federation (IAMTF) World Championships in Bangkok, Thailand (bronze) -91 kg
  - 2000 European Muay Thai Championships in Germany (gold) -91 kg
  - 1999 International Amateur Muay Thai Federation (IAMTF) World Championships in Bangkok, Thailand (bronze) -91 kg
- Honors:
  - 2025 Kickboxing Romania Awards Lifetime Achievement Award
  - 2006 Fight.ro Fighter of the Year
  - 2005 Fight.ro Most Technical Fighter
  - 2019 Combatpress.com Comeback Fighter of the Year nomination

== Kickboxing record ==
"

Kickboxing record
52 wins (41 (T) KOs), 12 losses
Date	Result	Opponent	Event	Location	Method	Round	Time
2019-03-29	Win	(Czech Republic) Petr Vondráček	Colosseum Tournament 11	Bucharest, Romania	KO (left hook)	1	2:22
2018-10-29	Win	(Bosnia and Herzegovina) Dževad Poturak	Colosseum Tournament 9	Cluj-Napoca, Romania	TKO (towel thrown)	1	1:38
2014-06-21	Loss	(Netherlands) Rico Verhoeven	Glory 17: Los Angeles	Inglewood, California, USA	Decision (unanimous)	5	3:00
For the Glory Heavyweight Championship.
2013-12-21	Win	(Curaçao) Errol Zimmerman	Glory 13: Tokyo	Tokyo, Japan	KO (left hook)	1	0:38
2013-10-12	Loss	(Netherlands) Rico Verhoeven	Glory 11: Chicago - Heavyweight World Championship Tournament, Final	Hoffman Estates, Illinois, USA	Decision (unanimous)	3	3:00
For the Glory Heavyweight Championship Tournament.
2013-10-12	Win	(Brazil) Anderson Silva	Glory 11: Chicago - Heavyweight World Championship Tournament, Semi Finals	Hoffman Estates, Illinois, USA	TKO (left body kick)	1	1:56
2013-09-12	Loss	(England) Chris Cooper	Enfusion Reality	Koh Samui, Thailand	Extra round unanimous decision	4	3:00
2013-06-22	Win	(France) Brice Guidon	Glory 9: New York	New York City, New York, USA	KO (left hook)	1	0:49
2013-04-06	Loss	(Turkey) Gökhan Saki	Glory 6: Istanbul	Istanbul, Turkey	TKO (punches)	2	0:18
Glory Heavyweight Championship eliminator.
2012-12-31	Loss	(Netherlands) Semmy Schilt	Glory 4: Tokyo - Heavyweight Grand Slam Tournament, Final	Saitama, Japan	TKO (left high kick)	1	2:52
For the Glory Heavyweight Grand Slam Tournament.
2012-12-31	Win	(Morocco) Jamal Ben Saddik	Glory 4: Tokyo - Heavyweight Grand Slam Tournament, Semi Finals	Saitama, Japan	KO (left body kick)	1	0:25
2012-12-31	Win	(Tunisia) Mourad Bouzidi	Glory 4: Tokyo - Heavyweight Grand Slam Tournament, Quarter Finals	Saitama, Japan	TKO (arm injury)	2	0:40
2012-12-31	Win	(Brazil) Jhonata Diniz	Glory 4: Tokyo - Heavyweight Grand Slam Tournament, First Round	Saitama, Japan	Decision (unanimous)	2	2:00
2012-06-30	Win	(Bosnia and Herzegovina) Dževad Poturak	It's Showtime 58	Brussels, Belgium	KO (liver kick)	2	0:45
2012-05-27	Win	(Curaçao) Wendell Roche	K-1 World MAX 2012 Championship Tournament Final 16, Super Fight	Madrid, Spain	TKO (towel thrown)	2	1:15
2012-05-12	Win	(Netherlands) Brian Douwes	It's Showtime 56	Kortrijk, Belgium	KO (left hook)	2	0:45
2012-03-10	Win	(Ukraine) Sergei Lascenko	Cro Cop Final Fight	Zagreb, Croatia	KO (right high kick)	3	0:49
2012-01-28	Win	(Netherlands) Hesdy Gerges	It's Showtime 55	Leeuwarden, Netherlands	KO (left hook)	1	2:47
Won the It's Showtime Heavyweight Championship.
2011-06-11	Win	(Turkey) Erhan Deniz	It's Showtime 50	Warsaw, Poland	KO (left hook to the body)	2	2:50
2011-05-14	Win	(Morocco) Fikri Ameziane	It's Showtime 48	Lyon, France	KO (right low kick)	1	3:00
2011-03-06	Loss	(Netherlands) Hesdy Gerges	It's Showtime 46	Amsterdam, Netherlands	Decision (unanimous)	3	3:00
2010-12-11	Loss	(Turkey) Gökhan Saki	K-1 World Grand Prix 2010 Final, Quarter Finals	Tokyo, Japan	Extra round decision (unanimous)	4	3:00
2010-10-02	Win	(Curaçao) Errol Zimmerman	K-1 World Grand Prix 2010 in Seoul Final 16	Seoul, Republic of Korea	KO (straight right)	2	0:18
Advanced to K-1 World Grand Prix 2010 Final.
2010-05-29	Loss	(Suriname) Ashwin Balrak	It's Showtime 41	Amsterdam, Netherlands	Decision (unanimous)	3	3:00
2010-02-13	Win	(Bosnia and Herzegovina) Dževad Poturak	It's Showtime 38	Prague, Czech Republic	Decision (unanimous)	3	3:00
2009-12-05	Win	(Russia) Sergei Kharitonov	K-1 World Grand Prix 2009 Final, Reserve Fight	Yokohama, Japan	KO (right low kick)	3	0:36
2009-09-26	Loss	(Netherlands) Semmy Schilt	K-1 World Grand Prix 2009 Final 16	Seoul, Republic of Korea	Decision (unanimous)	3	3:00
Failed to advance to K-1 World Grand Prix 2009 Final.
2009-08-11	Win	(Ukraine) Sergei Lascenko	K-1 World Grand Prix 2009 in Tokyo Final 16 Qualifying GP, Final	Tokyo, Japan	TKO (three knockdown rule)	1	2:19
Won the K-1 World Grand Prix Final 16 Qualifying GP tournament final.
2009-08-11	Win	(Japan) Yuki Niimura	K-1 World Grand Prix 2009 in Tokyo Final 16 Qualifying GP	Tokyo, Japan, Semi Finals	TKO (two knockdown rule)	1	1:28
2009-08-11	Win	(United Kingdom) John Love	K-1 World Grand Prix 2009 in Tokyo Final 16 Qualifying GP, Quarter Finals	Tokyo, Japan	TKO (two knockdown rule)	1	1:28
2009-05-16	Win	(Czech Republic) Tomáš Hron	It's Showtime 33	Amsterdam, Netherlands	KO (left low kick)	2	2:21
2009-02-28	Win	(Croatia) Igor Mihaljević	K-1 Rules Tournament 2009 in Budapest	Budapest, Hungary	KO (right low kick)	1	1:20
2008-12-20	Loss	(Czech Republic) Roman Kleibl	K-1 Fighting Network Prague 2008	Prague, Czech Republic	Extra round decision	4	3:00
2008-11-06	Loss	(Bosnia and Herzegovina) Dževad Poturak	Local Kombat 31	Buzău, Romania	Decision (unanimous)	3	3:00
2008-06-06	Win	(Switzerland) Björn Bregy	Local Kombat 30	Timișoara, Romania	Decision (unanimous)	3	3:00
2008-03-15	Win	(France) Freddy Kemayo	Local Kombat 29	Arad, Romania	KO (left hook)	2	2:30
2007-12-14	Win	(Lithuania) Tadas Rimkevicius	Local Kombat 28	Brașov, Romania	KO (low kick)	2	N/A
2007-11-03	Win	(Germany) James Phillips	Local Kombat 27	Drobeta-Turnu Severin, Romania	KO (low kicks)	2	1:58
2007-05-04	Win	(Japan) Nobu Hayashi	K-1 Fighting Network Romania 2007	Bucharest, Romania	Decision (unanimous)	3	3:00
2006-12-16	Win	(France) Gregory Tony	Local Kombat 24	Bucharest, Romania	KO (right hook)	2	2:09
2006-09-29	Win	(Portugal) Humberto Evora	Local Kombat 22	Iași, Romania	KO (right high kick)	1	2:19
2006-06-02	Win	(Germany) Muhammed Ali Durmaz	Local Kombat 21	Bacău, Romania	TKO (towel thrown)	1	2:10
2006-03-10	Loss	(France) Gregory Tony	Local Kombat 19	Iași, Romania	KO (right high kick)	1	2:19
2005-09-16	Win	(Belgium) Brecht Wallis	Local Kombat 16	Cluj-Napoca, Romania	Decision (unanimous)	3	3:00
2005-05-14	Win	(Tunisia) Mourad Bouzidi	Local Kombat 14	Bucharest, Romania	Decision (unanimous)	3	3:00
Won the WKN European Light Heavyweight Championship (Thai boxing rules)
2005-02-11	Win	(Portugal) Abel Jesus	Local Kombat 12	Cluj-Napoca, Romania	TKO (corner stoppage)	2	N/A
2004-10-22	Win	(Croatia) Ivica Perković	Local Kombat 10	Brăila, Romania	KO	3	N/A
2004-07-23	Win	(Romania) Florin Golopența	Local Kombat 8	Galați, Romania	TKO	3	N/A
2004-05-14	Win	(Bulgaria) Anatoly Danilov	Local Kombat 6	Galați, Romania	TKO	3	N/A
2004-03-26	Win	(Hungary) Tihamér Brunner	Local Kombat 5	Brașov, Romania	Decision (unanimous)	3	3:00
2004-02-26	Win	(Croatia) Nikola Jovanović	Local Kombat 4	Brașov, Romania	TKO	2	N/A
Legend: Win Loss Draw/no contest Notes

== See also ==
- List of male kickboxers
