= 2012 in K-1 =

Mixed martial arts events

Information
- First date: May 27
- Last date: December 15

Events
- Total events: 4

Fights

Chronology
2011 in K-1	2012 in K-1	2013 in K-1

This is a list of events held in 2012 by K-1, a kickboxing promotion based in Hong Kong.

== K-1 World MAX 2012 World Championship Tournament Final 16 ==
K-1 World MAX 2012 World Championship Tournament Final 16
- Promotion: K-1; It's Showtime
- Date: May 27, 2012
- Venue: Palacio Vistalegre
- City: (Spain) Madrid

K-1 World MAX 2012 World Championship Tournament Final 16 was a kickboxing event promoted by the K-1 in association with the Dutch-based promotion It's Showtime. It took place on May 27, 2012 at the Palacio Vistalegre in Madrid, Spain. It was the 9th annual K-1 World Max (70 kg/154 lb weight class) World Championship Final and the first K-1 event since the establishment of K-1 Global Holdings Ltd by EMCOM Entertainment.

These fights were played under K-1 rules with three three-minute rounds and one extra round.

=== K-1 World MAX 2012 Final 16 ===
Winner	Loser	Result
(Suriname) Andy Ristie	(Armenia) Gago Drago	Unanimous decision (3-0)
(Democratic Republic of the Congo) Chris Ngimbi	(Thailand) Longern Supepro Samui	Unanimous decision (3-0)
(Greece) Mike Zambidis	(Morocco) Chahid Oulad El Hadj	3rd round knockout (Left hook)
(Japan) Yasuhiro Kido	(China) Xu Yan	3rd round knockout (Spinning backfist)
(United Kingdom) Reece McAllister	(Japan) Yuji Nashiro	Unanimous Decision (3-0)
(Netherlands) Murthel Groenhart	(Armenia) Harut Grigorian	3rd round knockout (Punches)
(Netherlands) Andy Souwer	(Spain) Abraham Roqueñi	Split decision (2-1)
(Ukraine) Artur Kyshenko	(South Korea) Su-hwan Lee	2nd round knockout (Left hook)

=== Super fights ===
Winner	Loser	Result
(Ukraine) Sergei Lascenko	(Netherlands) Rico Verhoeven	Extra round split decision (2-1)
(Romania) Daniel Ghiţă	(Curaçao) Wendell Roche	Second round TKO (towel thrown)
(Croatia) Mirko Cro Cop	(Spain) Lorenzo Javier Jorge	2nd round knockout (Left uppercut)
(Morocco) Badr Hari	(Brazil) Anderson Silva	Unanimous decision (3-0)

== K-1 World Grand Prix 2012 in Los Angeles ==
K-1 World Grand Prix 2012 in Los Angeles
- Promotion: K-1; SUPERKOMBAT
- Date: September 8, 2012
- Venue: Memorial Sports Arena
- City: (United States) Los Angeles
- Attendance: 7,000

K-1 World Grand Prix 2012 in Los Angeles was a kickboxing event held by the K-1 in association with the Romanian-based promotion SUPERKOMBAT on September 8, 2012 at the Memorial Sports Arena in Los Angeles, California.

It was a qualifying tournament and involved eight fighters with all bouts being fought under K-1 Rules (100 kg/156-220 lbs). Xavier Vigney, Rick Roufus, Jarrell Miller and Randy Blake qualified for the K-1 World Grand Prix 2012 in Tokyo final 16. It also involved eight fighters who fought in the K-1 MAX (70 kg/154 lbs) weight division preliminaries and another eight in super fights. In total there were twenty-four fighters at the event, the majority representing the United States.

=== Undercard bouts ===
These fights were played under K-1 rules with three three-minute rounds.

Winner	Loser	Result
(United States) Mike Lemaire	(United States) Glen Spencer	3rd round Unanimous Decision
(United States) Damian Earley	(United States) Jermaine Soto	KO (right cross) at 1:13 of round 3
(United States) James Wilson	(United States) Doug Sauer	KO (left hook) at 2:32 of round 1

=== K-1 MAX (70 kg/154 lb) bouts ===
These fights were played under K-1 rules with three three-minute rounds.

Winner	Loser	Result
(United States) Justin Greskiewicz	(United States) Bryce Krause	TKO (referee stoppage) at 1:22 of round 3
(United States) Joey Pagliuso	(United States) Ben Yelle	KO at 0:18 of round 3
(United States) Michael Mananquil	(United States) Scott Leffler	3rd Round Unanimous Decision
(United States) Chaz Mulkey	(United States) Kit Cope	TKO at 2:16 of round 2

=== Super fights ===
These fights were played under K-1 rules with three three-minute rounds and an extra one round.

Winner	Loser	Result
(Japan) Shuichi Wentz	(United States) Romie Adanza	3rd round Unanimous Decision
(China) Kang En	(United States) Travis Garlits	3rd round Unanimous Decision
(Canada) Gabriel Varga	(Thailand) Lerdsila Chumpairtour	3rd round Unanimous Decision
(United States) Jeremiah Metcalf	(United States) Markhaile Wedderburn	KO (knee to the body) at 2:12 of round 1

=== Heavyweight (100 kg/220 lb) Qualifications ===
These fights were played under K-1 rules with three three-minute rounds.

Winner	Loser	Result
(United States) Xavier Vigney	(United States) Seth Petruzelli	TKO (knee) at 1:17 of round 2
(United States) Rick Roufus	(United States) Mighty Mo	3rd round Split Decision
(United States) Jarrell Miller	(United States) Jack May	KO (uppercut) at 2:42 of round 1
(United States) Randy Blake	(United States) Dewey Cooper	3rd round Unanimous Decision

== K-1 World Grand Prix 2012 in Tokyo final 16 ==
K-1 World Grand Prix 2012 in Tokyo final 16
- Promotion: K-1; SUPERKOMBAT
- Date: October 14, 2012
- Venue: Ryōgoku Kokugikan
- City: (Japan) Tokyo

K-1 World Grand Prix 2012 in Tokyo final 16 was a kickboxing event held by the K-1 in association with the Romanian-based promotion Superkombat Fighting Championship. on Sunday, October 14, 2012 at the Ryōgoku Kokugikan in Tokyo, Japan. It was the final elimination tournament for top sixteen fighters. The winners qualified for the K-1 World Grand Prix 2012 final.

K-1 World Grand Prix 2012 in Tokyo final 16
Undercard bouts: K-1 Rules / 3Min. 3R
(China) Zhou Zhipeng def. Kotaro Mori (Japan)
Peng defeated Mori by TKO (referee stoppage) at 1:23 of round 2.
(United States) Rick Roufus vs. James Wilson (United States)
Roufus and Wilson fought to a 3rd round draw.
(Romania) Benjamin Adegbuyi def. Jafar Ahmadi (Iran)
Adegbuyi defeated Ahmadi by TKO (injury) at 1:03 of round 1.
(Ukraine) Pavel Zhuravlev def. Saulo Cavalari (Brazil)
Zhuravlev defeated Cavalari by 3rd round unanimous decision.
(South Korea) Chang-hyung Lee def. Genji Umeno (Japan)
Lee defeated Umeno by 3rd round unanimous decision.
K-1 World Grand Prix (100 kg/220 lbs) bouts: K-1 Rules / 3Min. 3R
(Australia) Ben Edwards def. Raul Cătinaș (Romania)
Edwards defeated Cătinaş by TKO (referee stoppage) at 2:24 of round 2.
(United States) Jarrell Miller def. Arnold Oborotov (Lithuania)
Miller defeated Oborotov by 3rd round unanimous decision.
(Azerbaijan) Zabit Samedov def. Xavier Vigney (United States)
Samedov defeated Vigney by TKO (corner stoppage) at 1:47 of round 1.
(Netherlands) Hesdy Gerges def. Sergei Lascenko (Ukraine)
Gerges defeated Lascenko by 3rd round unanimous decision.
(Suriname) Ismael Londt def. Singh Jaideep (India)
Londt defeated Jaideep by 3rd round majority decision.
(Japan) Makoto Uehara def. Hiromi Amada (Japan)
Uehara defeated Amada by 3rd round unanimous decision.
(Romania) Cătălin Moroşanu def. Paul Slowinski (Poland)
Moroşanu defeated Slowinski by 3rd round unanimous decision.
(Croatia) Mirko Cro Cop def. Randy Blake (United States)
Cro Cop defeated Blake by 3rd round majority decision.

== K-1 World MAX 2012 World Championship Tournament final ==
K-1 World MAX 2012 World Championship Tournament Final
- Promotion: K-1
- Date: December 15, 2012
- Venue: O.A.C.A. Olympic Hall
- City: (Greece) Athens

K-1 World MAX 2012 World Championship Tournament Final was a kickboxing event promoted by the K-1 promotion. It took place on December 15, 2012 in Athens, Greece. It was the 9th annual K-1 World Max (70 kg/154 lbs weight class) World Championship Final and the first K-1 event since the establishment of K-1 Global Holdings Ltd by EMCOM Entertainment.

K-1 World MAX 2012 World Championship Tournament Final
K-1 World MAX 2012 Finals: K-1 Rules / 3Min. 3R Ext. 1R
(Netherlands) Murthel Groenhart def. Artur Kyshenko (Ukraine)
Groenhart defeated Kyshenko by 3rd round KO to win the K-1 World MAX 2012 Title.
K-1 World MAX 2012 Semifinals: K-1 Rules / 3Min. 3R Ext. 1R
(Ukraine) Artur Kyshenko def. Andy Souwer (Netherlands)
Kyshenko defeated Souwer by 3rd round unanimous decision 3-0.
(Netherlands) Murthel Groenhart def. Mike Zambidis (Greece)
Groenhart defeated Zambidis by 2nd round TKO.
K-1 World MAX 2012 Quarterfinals: K-1 Rules / 3Min. 3R Ext. 1R
(Netherlands) Andy Souwer def. Andy Ristie (Suriname)
Souwer defeated Ristie by 3rd round majority decision 2-0.
(Ukraine) Artur Kyshenko def. Chris Ngimbi (Democratic Republic of the Congo)
Kyshenko defeated Ngimbi by 2nd round KO.
(Netherlands) Murthel Groenhart def. Yasuhiro Kido (Japan)
Groehart defeated Kido by 1st round KO.
(Greece) Mike Zambidis def. Reece McAllister (United Kingdom)
Zambidis defeated McAllister by 3rd round unanimous decision 3-0.
Super fights: K-1 Rules / 3Min. 3R Ext. 1R
(Suriname) Cedric Manhoef def. Songkran Bamrungsri (Thailand)
Manhoef defeated Bamrungsri by 3rd round unanimous decision 3-0.
(Ukraine) Enrico Gogokhiia def. Erkan Varol (Turkey)
Gogokhiia defeated Varol by 3rd round unanimous decision 3-0.
Reserve fight: K-1 Rules / 3Min. 3R Ext. 1R
(Spain) Abraham Roqueni def. Xu Yan (China)
Roqueni defeated Yan by 3rd round unanimous decision 3-0.

=== K-1 World MAX 2012 Tournament bracket ===
First round
(Greece) Mike Zambidis	KO
(Morocco) Chahid Oulad El Hadj	3rd
(United Kingdom) Reece McAllister	DEC
(Japan) Yuji Nashiro	3-0
(Japan) Yasuhiro Kido	KO
(China) Xu Yan	3rd
(Armenia) Harut Grigorian	3rd
(Netherlands) Murthel Groenhart	KO
(Ukraine) Artur Kyshenko	KO
(South Korea) Su-hwan Lee	2nd
(Democratic Republic of the Congo) Chris Ngimbi	DEC
(Thailand) Longern Superpro Samui	3-0
(Netherlands) Andy Souwer	DEC
(Spain) Abraham Roqueñi	2-1
(Suriname) Andy Ristie	DEC
(Armenia) Gago Drago	3-0

Quarter-finals
(Greece) Mike Zambidis	DEC
(United Kingdom) Reece McAllister	3-0
(Japan) Yasuhiro Kido	1st
(Netherlands) Murthel Groenhart	KO
(Ukraine) Artur Kyshenko	KO
(Democratic Republic of the Congo) Chris Ngimbi	2nd
(Netherlands) Andy Souwer	DEC
(Suriname) Andy Ristie	2-0

Semi-finals
(Greece) Mike Zambidis	2nd
(Netherlands) Murthel Groenhart	KO
(Ukraine) Artur Kyshenko	DEC
(Netherlands) Andy Souwer	3-0

Final
(Netherlands) Murthel Groenhart	KO
(Ukraine) Artur Kyshenko	3rd

== See also ==
- List of K-1 events
- List of K-1 champions
- List of male kickboxers
