= Nikita Zhuravlyov =

Russian footballer

Personal information
- Full name: Nikita Stanislavovich Zhuravlyov
- Date of birth: 21 August 1994 (age 32)
- Height: 1.79 m (5 ft 10 1/2 in)
- Position: Midfielder

Youth career
- 2008–2009: Akademiya Futbola Nizhny Novgorod
- 2009–2010: FC Krasnodar

Senior career*
Years	Team	Apps	(Gls)
2011–2012	FC Nizhny Novgorod-2		
2013–2014	FC Khimik Dzerzhinsk	8	(0)
2014	FC Baltika Kaliningrad	0	(0)
2015	FC Khimik-Tosol-Sintez Dzerzhinsk		
2016	FC Dzerzhinsk-TS Dzerzhinsk		
2017	FC Uran Dzerzhinsk		
- * Club domestic league appearances and goals

Nikita Stanislavovich Zhuravlyov (Russian: Никита Станиславович Журавлёв; born 21 August 1994) is a former Russian football midfielder.

== Club career ==
He made his debut in the Russian Football National League for FC Khimik Dzerzhinsk on 13 July 2013 in a game against FC Baltika Kaliningrad.
