= Aleksey Zhuravlyov (footballer) =

Russian footballer

Personal information
- Full name: Aleksey Aleksandrovich Zhuravlyov
- Date of birth: 12 January 1980 (age 46)
- Place of birth: Potsdam, East Germany
- Height: 1.82 m (5 ft 11 1/2 in)
- Positions: Defender; midfielder

Senior career*
Years	Team	Apps	(Gls)
1998–1999	FC Arsenal-2 Tula	37	(1)
2001	FC Arsenal-2 Tula	37	(5)
2002	FC Kavkazkabel Prokhladny	11	(0)
2002–2003	FC Don Novomoskovsk	53	(7)
2004	FC Ural Yekaterinburg	26	(1)
2005	FC Nosta Novotroitsk	29	(0)
2006–2007	FC Ryazan	61	(5)
2008	FC Volga Ulyanovsk	38	(0)
2009–2010	FC Metallurg Lipetsk	56	(5)
2011–2012	FC Volga Ulyanovsk	22	(0)
2012–2015	FC Metallurg Lipetsk	60	(2)
- * Club domestic league appearances and goals

Aleksey Aleksandrovich Zhuravlyov (Russian: Алексей Александрович Журавлёв; born 12 January 1980) is a Russian former professional football player.

== Club career ==
He played 2 seasons in the Russian Football National League for FC Volga Ulyanovsk and FC Metallurg Lipetsk.
