= Sergei Zhuravlyov (footballer, born 1976) =

Russian footballer

Personal information
- Full name: Sergei Yuryevich Zhuravlyov
- Date of birth: 10 October 1976 (age 50)
- Height: 1.86 m (6 ft 1 in)
- Position: Defender

Senior career*
| Years | Team | Apps | (Gls) |
| 1995–1999 | FC Tyumen | 16 | (0) |
| 1995–1996 | → FC Dynamo-Gazovik-d Tyumen (loans) | 35 | (0) |
- * Club domestic league appearances and goals

Sergei Yuryevich Zhuravlyov (Russian: Сергей Юрьевич Журавлёв; born 10 October 1976) is a former Russian football player.
