= Pavel Zhuravlev (kickboxer) =

Ukrainian kickboxer (born 1983)

- Born: Pavlo Zhuravlev; July 29, 1983 (age 43); Saky, Ukrainian SSR, Soviet Union
- Native name: Павло Журавльов
- Other names: The Caiman
- Nationality: (Ukraine) Ukrainian
- Height: 1.87 m (6 ft 1 1/2 in)
- Weight: 98.4 kg (217 lb; 15.50 st)
- Division: Heavyweight (kickboxing); Cruiserweight (boxing)
- Style: Kickboxing, Muay Thai
- Fighting out of: Odesa, Ukraine
- Team: Sevastopol Muay Thai
- Years active: 2003–present

Professional boxing record
- Total: 13
- Wins: 11
- By knockout: 7
- Losses: 2
- By knockout: 0

Kickboxing record
- Total: 85
- Wins: 73
- By knockout: 27
- Losses: 11
- By knockout: 4
- Draws: 1

Other information
- Boxing record from BoxRec
- Last updated on: September 19, 2014

Pavel Zhuravlev (Ukrainian: Павло Журавльов, Pavlo Zhuravlov; Russian: Павел Журавлёв; born July 27, 1983) is a Ukrainian kickboxer and boxer. He is the former Interim GLORY Light Heavyweight Champion, the 2012 SUPERKOMBAT World Grand Prix Tournament Champion, the 2013 Legend Fighting Show -93 kg Tournament Champion and the K-1 World Grand Prix FINAL in Zagreb Semifinalist.

As of February 2021, Zhuravlev is ranked the #4 light-heavyweight in the world by Combat Press. He first entered the Light Heavyweight rankings in October 2015.

== Biography and career ==
=== Early career ===
After graduation from the Nakhimov Naval Academy in Sevastopol Zhuravlev is since 2010 lieutenant in the Ukrainian Navy.

After winning various tournaments in the WBKF, a Russian kickboxing circuit, Pavel made his K-1 debut on August 2, 2009, at K-1 World Grand Prix 2009 in Seoul against Gokhan Saki and won by decision.

On December 16, 2010, he took part in the 16-man tournament at KOK World GP 2010 in Moscow and went on to win the Grand Prix by defeating Prince Ali, Evgeny Orlov and Alexey Kudin.

=== SUPERKOMBAT ===
On October 1, 2011, Pavel Zhuravlev advanced to Superkombat World Grand Prix Final in Darmstadt, Germany, joining Sergei Lascenko and Ismael Londt. Zhuravlev won the third event of the series from Brăila, Romania, defeating Ricardo van den Bos and Sebastien van Thielen via unanimous decisions.

He faced Saulo Cavalari in a non-tournament bout at the K-1 World Grand Prix 2012 in Tokyo final 16 on October 14, 2012 and won via unanimous decision.

He won a unanimous decision over Freddy Kemayo on November 10, 2012, in Craiova, Romania at the SuperKombat World Grand Prix 2012 Final Elimination, which is the quarter-finals of the SuperKombat World Grand Prix 2012.

He fought Benjamin Adegbuyi in the semi-finals at the SuperKombat World Grand Prix 2012 Final on December 22, 2012, in Bucharest and won the fight by KO after 25 seconds. In the final, Zhuravlev rematched Ismael Londt. This time the outcome was reversed as Zhuravlev became champion after extra round unanimous decision.

=== K-1 and FFC ===
Despite having not qualified for the tournament, Zhuravlev replaced Makoto Uehara to fight at the K-1 World Grand Prix FINAL in Zagreb on March 15, 2013, in Zagreb, Croatia. After defeating Cătălin Moroşanu by unanimous decision in the quarter-finals, he was eliminated by the eventual winner, Mirko Cro Cop, by the same margin in the semis.

He earned first round TKO victory over Luca Panto at Final Fight Championship 3: Jurković vs. Cătinaș in Split, Croatia on April 19, 2013.

He lost to Hesdy Gerges by unanimous decision at Final Fight Championship 6 in Poreč, Croatia on June 14, 2013.

He won the -93 kg/205 lb tournament at Legend 2: Invasion in Moscow, Russia on November 9, 2013. After TKOing Sahak Parparyan in round one in the semi-finals, he was set to face Zabit Samedov in the final but Samedov was forced to withdraw due to a cut and was replaced by Agron Preteni. He also beat Preteni by TKO, this time in round two.

He rematched Benjamin Adegbuyi at the SuperKombat World Grand Prix 2013 Final in Galați, Romania on December 21, 2013, losing by third round KO.

Following the 2014 Russian annexation of Crimea Zhuravlev moved to Odessa and continued his career in the Ukrainian navy.

=== GLORY ===
Zhuravlev was expected to face Tomasz Szczepkowski at Legend 3: Pour Homme in Milan, Italy on April 5, 2014 but Szczepkowski withdrew for undisclosed reasons and was replaced by fellow Pole Michal Turynski two days before the fight. Zhuravlev defeated Turynski via majority decision.

Zhuravlev faced Saulo Cavalari of Brazil in the headline event at Glory 43 Super Fight Series on July 14, 2017, at The Theater at Madison Square Garden in New York. Zhuravlev defeated Cavalari via unanimous decision (30–26, 30–26, and 29–27).

Zhuravlev fought once in 2018, against Myron Dennis, during Glory 52. He won the fight by unanimous decision.

=== Other promotions ===
Pavel was scheduled to fight Iraj Azizpour on August 24, 2019. Azizpour was later replaced by Mehmet Ozer. He beat Ozer by a second round low kick TKO.

Zhuravlev was set to take part in an FEA Heavyweight Grand Prix, in February 2021. Instead of taking part in the grand prix, he was scheduled to fight Cristian Ristea at FEA: Reset on March 13, 2021, for the FEA Heavyweight title. However, Zhuravlev pulled out of the fight citing a bicep injury. He was replaced by Kirill Kornilov.

== Titles ==
=== Kickboxing ===
- FEA Fights
  - 2019 interim FEA Heavyweight Champion.
- Glory
  - 2017 Interim Glory Light Heavyweight Champion.
- Final Fight Championship
  - 2016 FFC Light Heavyweight Championship (-95 kg)
- Legend Fighting Show
  - 2013 Legend Fighting Show -93 kg tournament champion
- K-1
  - K-1 World Grand Prix FINAL in Zagreb semifinalist
- SUPERKOMBAT Fighting Championship
  - 2012 SUPERKOMBAT World Grand Prix Tournament champion
  - 2011 SUPERKOMBAT World Grand Prix III champion
- King of Kings
  - 2010 KOK World GP 2010 in Moscow champion
- W5 Professional Kickboxing
  - 2009 W5 (+96 kg) Heavyweight champion
  - 2009 W5 Grand Prix tournament champion
- World BARS Kickboxing Federation
  - 2009 WBKF European Heavyweight champion (-93 kg)
  - 2009 WBKF World Super Heavyweight champion (+93 kg)
  - 2008 WBKF World Super Heavyweight champion (+93 kg)
  - 2008 WBKF European Super Heavyweight champion (+93 kg)
  - 2007 WBKF European Heavyweight champion (-93 kg)
  - 2006 WBKF European Cruiserweight (86 kg) title
  - 2005 SNG (WBKF) Kickboxing Heavyweight champion (-93 kg)
- Gladiators of Ukraine
  - 2007 Gladiators of Ukraine - Lviv K-1 Grand Prix champion
- SNG
  - 2006 SNG Thaiboxing Heavyweight (91 kg) title
- King's Cup
  - 2004 King's Cup at Bangkok, Thailand champion

=== Boxing ===
  - 2012 Bigger’S Better 13 tournament runner-up
  - 2010 Bigger’S Better 1 tournament runner-up

== Fight record ==
Kickboxing record (Incomplete)
73 Wins (27 (T)KO's, 43 decisions), 11 Losses, 1 Draw
Date	Result	Opponent	Event	Location	Method	Round	Time
2019-08-26	Win	(Turkey) Mehmet Özer	FEA World GP	Odesa, Ukraine	TKO (low kick)	2	
Wins Interim FEA Heavyweight Championship.
2018-03-31	Win	(United States) Myron Dennis	Glory 52: Los Angeles	Los Angeles, United States	Decision (unanimous)	3	3:00
2017-07-14	Win	(Brazil) Saulo Cavalari	Glory 43: New York	New York City, New York	Decision (unanimous)	3	3:00
Wins Interim Glory Light Heavyweight Championship.
2016-11-05	Win	(Algeria) Zinedine Hameur-Lain	Glory 35: Nice	Nice, France	TKO (punches)	1	1:55
2016-07-22	Loss	(Brazil) Ariel Machado	Glory 32: Virginia, Semi Finals	Norfolk, Virginia, US	Decision (unanimous)	3	3:00
2016-06-10	Win	(United States) Benjamin Fuimaono	FFC 25: Mitchell vs Lopez	Springfield, Massachusetts, US	TKO (punches)	1	2:15
2016-02-19	Win	(Netherlands) Brian Douwes	FFC22: Athens	Athens, Greece	TKO	3	N/A
Wins Vacated FFC Light Heavyweight Championship (-95 kg).
2015-12-19	Win	(Morocco) Nouh Chahboune	KOK World GP 2015 in Moldova	Chișinău, Moldova	KO	3	2:59
2015-09-26	Win	(France) Freddy Kemayo	KOK World GP 2015 - Heavyweight Tournament, Quarter Finals	Chișinău, Moldova	KO	3	2:59
2014-11-28	Win	(Poland) Kryspin Kalski	KOK World GP 2014	Płock, Poland	Decision (unanimous)	3	3:00
2014-09-19	Win	(Russia) Vladimir Toktasynov	KOK World GP 2014 in Chișinău	Chișinău, Moldova	Decision (unanimous)	3	3:00
2014-04-05	Win	(Poland) Michał Turyński	Legend 3: Pour Homme	Milan, Italy	Decision (majority)	3	3:00
2013-12-21	Loss	(Romania) Benjamin Adegbuyi	SUPERKOMBAT World Grand Prix 2013 Final	Galați, Romania	KO (right hook)	3	1:20
2013-11-08	Win	(Croatia) Agron Preteni	Legend 2: Invasion, Final	Moscow, Russia	TKO (left hook)	2	0:46
Wins Legend Fighting Show -93kg tournament title.
2013-11-08	Win	(Armenia) Sahak Parparyan	Legend 2: Invasion, Semi Finals	Moscow, Russia	TKO (punches)	1	2:36
2013-06-14	Loss	(Netherlands) Hesdy Gerges	FFC06: Jurković vs. Poturak	Poreč, Croatia	Decision (unanimous)	3	3:00
2013-05-24	Win	(Netherlands) Vinchenzo Renfurm	FFC05: Rodriguez vs. Simonjič	Osijek, Croatia	KO (right hook)	2	0:13
2013-04-18	Win	(Italy) Luca Panto	FFC03: Jurković vs. Cătinaș	Split, Croatia	TKO (referee stoppage)	1	1:30
2013-03-15	Loss	(Croatia) Mirko Cro Cop	K-1 World Grand Prix FINAL in Zagreb, Semi Finals	Zagreb, Croatia	Decision (unanimous)	3	3:00
2013-03-15	Win	(Romania) Cătălin Moroşanu	K-1 World Grand Prix FINAL in Zagreb, Quarter Finals	Zagreb, Croatia	Decision (unanimous)	3	3:00
2012-12-22	Win	(Suriname) Ismael Londt	SUPERKOMBAT World Grand Prix 2012 Final, Final	Bucharest, Romania	Ext. R Decision (unanimous)	4	3:00
Wins the 2012 SUPERKOMBAT World Grand Prix tournament title.
2012-12-22	Win	(Romania) Benjamin Adegbuyi	SUPERKOMBAT World Grand Prix 2012 Final, Semi Finals	Bucharest, Romania	KO (left hook)	1	0:25
2012-11-10	Win	(France) Freddy Kemayo	SUPERKOMBAT World Grand Prix 2012 Final Elimination, Quarter Finals	Craiova, Romania	Decision (unanimous)	3	3:00
2012-10-14	Win	(Brazil) Saulo Cavalari	K-1 World Grand Prix 2012 in Tokyo final 16	Tokyo, Japan	Decision (unanimous)	3	3:00
2011-11-19	Loss	(Suriname) Ismael Londt	SUPERKOMBAT World Grand Prix 2011 Final, Semi Finals	Darmstadt, Germany	Ext. R Decision	4	3:00
2011-10-01	Win	(Belgium) Sebastien van Thielen	SUPERKOMBAT World Grand Prix III 2011, Final	Brăila, Romania	Decision (unanimous)	3	3:00
Wins SUPERKOMBAT World Grand Prix III tournament title.
2011-10-01	Win	(Netherlands) Ricardo van den Bos	SUPERKOMBAT World Grand Prix III 2011, Semi Finals	Brăila, Romania	Decision (unanimous)	3	3:00
2011-05-28	Loss	(Croatia) Igor Jurković	United Glory 14: 2010-2011 World Series Finals	Moscow, Russia	TKO (doctor stoppage)	2	0:20
2010-12-16	Win	(Belarus) Alexey Kudin	KOK World GP 2010 in Moscow, final	Odintsovo, Russia	2 Ext. R Decision (split)	5	3:00
Wins KOK World GP 2010 in Moscow tournament.
2010-12-16	Win	(Russia) Evgeny Orlov	KOK World GP 2010 in Moscow, semi final	Odintsovo, Russia	TKO (right low kick)	1	0:46
2010-12-16	Win	(Iran) Prince Ali	KOK World GP 2010 in Moscow, quarter final	Odintsovo, Russia	TKO (referee stoppage)	2	2:25
2010-09-19	Loss	(Australia) Nathan Corbett	Domination 5	Perth, Australia	KO (knee strike)	4	N/A
Fight was for vacant World Kickboxing Network (W.K.N.) Muay Thai World title -96kg.
2010-04-17	Draw	(Belarus) Alexei Kudin	Big8 Grand Prix "European Selection"	Kharkiv, Ukraine	Draw	3	3:00
2009-10-31	Win	(Tunisia) Mourad Bouzidi	W5 Grand Prix 2009 Ryazan	Ryazan, Russia	Decision (unanimous)	3	3:00
Wins W5 (+96 kg) World title.
2009-08-02	Win	(Turkey) Gökhan Saki	K-1 World Grand Prix 2009 in Seoul	Seoul, Korea	Decision (unanimous)	3	3:00
2009-07-11	Win	(Turkey) Mehmet Özer	W5 Grand Prix Heavyweight tournament	Solnechnogorsk, Russia	TKO	3	N/A
Wins W5 Grand Prix Heavyweight (-93 kg) tournament title.
2009-07-11	Win	(Belarus) Evgeny Angalevich	W5 Grand Prix Heavyweight tournament	Solnechnogorsk, Russia	Decision (unanimous)	3	3:00
2009-04-23	Win	(Belarus) Evgeny Angalevich	WBKF Europe Tournament (-93 kg) @ Club Arbat	Moscow, Russia	Decision (unanimous)	3	3:00
Wins WBKF European Heavyweight (-93 kg) tournament title.
2009-04-23	Win	(Russia) Elvin Abbasov	WBKF Europe Tournament (-93 kg) @ Club Arbat	Moscow, Russia	Decision (unanimous)	3	3:00
2009-03-26	Win	(Latvia) Konstantin Gluhov	WBKF World Tournament (+93 kg) @ Club Arbat	Moscow, Russia	Decision (unanimous)	3	3:00
Retains WBKF World Super Heavyweight (+93 kg) tournament title.
2009-03-26	Win	(Belarus) Alexei Kudin	WBKF World Tournament (+93 kg) @ Club Arbat	Moscow, Russia	Decision (unanimous)	3	3:00
2009-01-31	Win	(Russia) Elvin Abbasov	Tatneft Cup 2009 3rd selection for 1/8 final	Kazan, Russia	TKO	3	N/A
2008-12-17	Loss	(Latvia) Konstantin Gluhov	Warrior's Honor-3. Final	Kharkiv, Ukraine	Decision (unanimous)	4	3:00
Fight was for Warrior's Honor-3 tournament title.
2008-12-17	Win	(Ukraine) Dmytro Borulko	Warrior's Honor-3. Final	Kharkiv, Ukraine	Decision (unanimous)	3	3:00
2008-12-17	Win	(Ukraine) Serhiy Lashchenko	Warrior's Honor-3. Final	Kharkiv, Ukraine	Decision (unanimous)	3	3:00
2008-10-30	Win	(Belarus) Alexei Kudin	WBKF European Tournament (+93 kg) @ Club Arbat	Moscow, Russia	Decision (majority)	3	3:00
Wins WBKF European Super Heavyweight (+93 kg) tournament title.
2008-10-30	Win	(France) Nicolas Wamba	WBKF European Tournament (+93 kg) @ Club Arbat	Moscow, Russia	Decision (unanimous)	3	3:00
2008-05-29	Win	(Belarus) Alexei Kudin	WBKF World Tournament (+93 kg) @ Club Arbat	Moscow, Russia	Decision (split)	3	3:00
Wins WBKF World Super Heavyweight (+93 kg) tournament title.
2008-05-29	Win	(France) Karim Lyadzissi	WBKF World Tournament (+93 kg) @ Club Arbat	Moscow, Russia	Decision (unanimous)	3	3:00
2008-04-04	Win	(Latvia) Konstantin Gluhov	Warrior's Honor-3. 1st Qualifikation	Kharkiv, Ukraine	Decision (unanimous)	3	3:00
Qualifies for Warrior's Honor-3 Final.
2008-04-04	Win	N/A	Warrior's Honor-3. 1st qualification	Kharkiv, Ukraine	N/A	N/A	N/A
2008-04-04	Win	N/A	Warrior's Honor-3. 1st qualification	Kharkiv, Ukraine	N/A	N/A	N/A
2008-02-08	Win	N/A	Warrior's Honor-2. Final	Kharkiv, Ukraine	N/A	N/A	N/A
Win Warrior's Honor-2 tournament title.
2008-02-08	Win	N/A	Warrior's Honor-2. Final	Kharkiv, Ukraine	N/A	N/A	N/A
2008-02-08	Win	N/A	Warrior's Honor-2. Final	Kharkiv, Ukraine	N/A	N/A	N/A
2007-12-19	Win	(Ukraine) Maksym Neledva	WBKF European Tournament Final(-93 kg) @ Club Arbat	Moscow, Russia	Decision (unanimous)	3	3:00
Wins WBKF European Heavyweight (-93 kg) title.
2007-11-07	Win	(Belarus) Vladimir Popov	WBKF European Tournament SemiFinal(-93 kg) @ Club Arbat	Moscow, Russia	Decision (unanimous)	3	3:00
2007-10-12	Win	(Azerbaijan) Ceyhun Safarov	A-1 World Combat Cup	Ankara, Turkey	Decision (unanimous)	3	3:00
2007-10-03	Win	(Uzbekistan) Vitali Oparin	WBKF European Tournament QuarterFinal(-93 kg) @ Club Arbat	Moscow, Russia	Decision (unanimous)	3	3:00
2007-05-19	Win	(Dagestan) Dzhavatkhan Atakov	Battle of Champions	Moscow, Russia	TKO (referee stoppage)	3	N/A
2007-04-26	Win	(Ukraine) Andriy Yembalayev	Gladiators of Ukraine - Lviv K-1 Grand Prix, final	Lviv, Ukraine	TKO (referee stoppage)	3	00:30
Wins Gladiators of Ukraine - Lviv K-1 Grand Prix tournament.
2007-04-26	Win	(Ukraine) Andrey Osadchiy	Gladiators of Ukraine - Lviv K-1 Grand Prix, semi final	Lviv, Ukraine	Decision (unanimous)	3	3:00
2007-04-26	Win	(Ukraine) Olexander Skripka	Gladiators of Ukraine - Lviv K-1 Grand Prix, quarter final	Lviv, Ukraine	TKO (high kick)	1	01:55
2007-04-18	Loss	(Belarus) Alexei Kudin	WBKF European Tournament (+93 kg) @ Club Arbat	Moscow, Russia	Decision (split)	3	3:00
2007-02-23	Win	(Ukraine) Andriy Yembalayev	Star Ring	Kharkiv, Ukraine	Decision (unanimous)	3	3:00
2007-01-04	Win	(Russia) Andrei Sen	Fight Club Arbat	Moscow, Russia	KO	3	N/A
2006-12-15	Win	(Ukraine) Denys Liadovyi	Warrior's Honor-2. 1st Qualifikation	Kharkiv, Ukraine	N/A	1	N/A
Qualifies for Warrior's Honor-2 Final.
2006-12-15	Win	N/A	Warrior's Honor-2. 1st Qualifikation	Kharkiv, Ukraine	N/A	N/A	N/A
2006-12-15	Win	N/A	Warrior's Honor-2. 1st Qualifikation	Kharkiv, Ukraine	N/A	N/A	N/A
2006-08-19	Win	(Ukraine) Andriy Yembalayev	Arhat Cup @ Club "Solnyshko"	Evpatoria, Ukraine	Decision (unanimous)	4	3:00
2006-08-02	Win	(Russia) Dimitri Antonenko	SNG (WBKF) Kickboxing champion(-93 kg) @ Club Arbat	Moscow, Russia	KO	4	N/A
Retains SNG (WBKF) Kickboxing Heavyweight (-93 kg) title.
2006-08-02	Win	(Russia) Artem Yashnov	SNG Thaiboxing champion(-91 kg) @ Club Arbat	Moscow, Russia	TKO	3	N/A
Wins SNG Thaiboxing Heavyweight (-91 kg) title.
2006-04-26	Loss	(Ukraine) Maksym Neledva	WBKF World Heavyweight (-93 kg) @ Club Arbat	Moscow, Russia	TKO	6	N/A
Fight was for WBKF World Heavyweight (-93 kg) title.
2006-03-01	Win	(Russia) Yevgeni Gubar	WBKF European champion(86 kg) @ Club Arbat	Moscow, Russia	TKO	4	N/A
Wins WBKF European Cruiserweight (86 kg) title.
2006-02-17	Win	(Ukraine) Andriy Kyndrych	Warrior's Honor-1. Final	Kharkiv, Ukraine	Decision	3	3:00
Fight was for Warrior's Honor-1 tournament title.
2006-02-17	Win	(Ukraine) Dmytry Popov	Warrior's Honor-1. Final	Kharkiv, Ukraine	N/A	1	N/A
2006-02-17	Win	(Ukraine) Stanislav Bilokon	Warrior's Honor-1. Final	Kharkiv, Ukraine	Decision	3	3:00
2005-12-21	Win	(Russia) Salim Abakarov	Fight Club Arbat	Moscow, Russia	Decision (unanimous)	3	3:00
2005-10-26	Win	(Ukraine) Andriy Kyndrych	Fight Club Arbat	Moscow, Russia	Decision (unanimous)	3	3:00
2005-07-27	Win	(Russia) Nikolai Savin	SNG (WBKF) Kickboxing champion(-93 kg) @ Club Arbat	Moscow, Russia	Decision (unanimous)	3	3:00
Wins SNG (WBKF) Kickboxing Heavyweight (-93 kg) title.
2005-06-29	Win	(Russia) Ruslan Baklanov	Fight Club Arbat	Moscow, Russia	KO	1	N/A
2005-05-00	Win	N/A	Warrior's Honor-1. 1st Qualifikation	Kharkiv, Ukraine	N/A	N/A	N/A
Qualifies for Warrior's Honor-1 Final.
2005-05-00	Win	N/A	Warrior's Honor-1. 1st Qualifikation	Kharkiv, Ukraine	N/A	N/A	N/A
2005-05-00	Win	N/A	Warrior's Honor-1. 1st Qualifikation	Kharkiv, Ukraine	N/A	N/A	N/A

Boxing record
11 Wins (7 (T)KO's, 4 decisions), 2 Losses
Date	Result	Opponent	Event	Location	Method	Round	Time	Record
2012-07-06	Loss	(Latvia) Mairis Briedis	Monte Caputo, Final	Limassol, Cyprus	SD	4	3:00	11–2
Fight was for Bigger's Better 13 tournament.
2012-07-06	Win	(Cyprus) Panagiotis Diakos	Monte Caputo, Semifinal	Limassol, Cyprus	TKO	2	N/A	11–1
2012-07-06	Win	(Poland) Kamil Małysz	Monte Caputo, Quarterfinal	Limassol, Cyprus	TKO	1	N/A	10–1
2012-04-26	Win	(Ukraine) Vitaliy Neveselyy	Sportpalace	Kharkiv, Ukraine	UD	8	3:00	9–1
2011-04-27	Win	(Ukraine) Ihor Pylypenko	Sportpalace	Kharkiv, Ukraine	TKO	5	N/A	8–1
2010-05-07	Loss	(Latvia) Mairis Briedis	Pavilion Nicosia, Final	Nicosia, Cyprus	UD	3	3:00	7–1
Fight was for Bigger's Better 13 tournament.
2010-05-07	Win	(Nigeria) Gbenga Oloukun	Pavilion Nicosia, Semifinal	Nicosia, Cyprus	UD	3	3:00	7–0
2010-05-07	Win	(Serbia) Miodrag Petkovic	Pavilion Nicosia, Quarterfinal	Nicosia, Cyprus	TKO	1	1:47	6–0
2009-05-24	Win	(Ukraine) Oleh Rohatinov	Sport Club of National University of Shipbuilding	Mykolaiv, Ukraine	UD	6	3:00	5–0
2008-09-05	Win	(Ukraine) Andriy Kindrich	State Naval Institute	Sevastopol, Ukraine	UD	6	3:00	4–0
2008-06-29	Win	(Ukraine) Ivan Bohdanov	Sportpalace Lokomotyv	Kharkiv, Ukraine	TKO	4	N/A	3–0
2008-04-05	Win	(Russia) Vladimir Kurtsev	Sportpalace Lokomotyv	Kharkiv, Ukraine	TKO	1	N/A	2–0
2007-11-15	Win	(Ukraine) Ruslan Ivanenko	Sportpalace Lokomotyv	Kharkiv, Ukraine	TKO	2	2:24	1–0
Legend: Win Loss Draw/No contest Notes

== See also ==
- List of K-1 events
- List of K-1 champions
- List of male kickboxers
