= Alexey Ignashov =

Belarusian kickboxer

- Born: 18 January 1978 (age 48); Minsk, Byelorussian SSR, Soviet Union
- Other names: The Red Scorpion
- Nationality: Belarusian
- Height: 1.96 m (6 ft 5 in)
- Weight: 117 kg (258 lb; 18.4 st)
- Division: Heavyweight
- Style: Muay Thai, kickboxing
- Fighting out of: Auckland, New Zealand
- Team: Chinuk Gym (1995–2006); Balmoral Lee Gar (2006–present)
- Trainer: Lollo Heimuli; Andrei Gridin; Horia Rădulescu (part-time)
- Years active: 1997–2018

Kickboxing record
- Total: 108
- Wins: 86
- By knockout: 41
- Losses: 22

Alexey Ignashov (Belarusian: Аляксей Ігнашоў; born 18 January 1978) is a Belarusian former Heavyweight kickboxer. He is a four-time Muay Thai World champion, K-1 World GP 2003 in Paris and K-1 World GP 2001 in Nagoya tournament champion. As of 2011 he is living in Auckland, New Zealand, and training at Balmoral Lee Gar Gym under Lollo Heimuli.

== Biography ==
He is best known for his knee strikes, notably used to score knockout wins over Badr Hari, Semmy Schilt, Nicholas Pettas, and Carter Williams. Ignashov is considered by his fans to be one of the most talented and technically sound heavyweight kickboxers in the world. However, he is also considered by many as frustratingly inconsistent, occasionally appearing lackluster or inactive in the ring, such as in his K-1 Final quarterfinal match against Peter Aerts in 2003. He suffered a knee injury in a fight against Bjorn Bregy in 2005. Since then, his performance has diminished.

Ignashov trained in the Chinuk gym for 11 years, before immigrating to New Zealand in 2006.

He has beaten the best kickboxers in the world, including decision wins over three times K-1 champions Remy Bonjasky and Peter Aerts and knockout highlight reel wins over two currently best kickboxers in the world Semmy Schilt and Badr Hari. He has also fought legendary Rob Kaman, losing by decision, but after that fight Kaman gave the trophy to Ignashov. Despite all those huge wins, he has lost some bouts where he was a huge favorite. He was TKO'd only two times, each time because of injury, against Bjorn Bregy in 2005 and in his 2009 bout against 2003 French Kickboxing champion Freddy Kemayo.

After 5 years of being out of the major ring events Iggy was granted his wish to return to K-1 in April 2010 against Badr Hari, having one of the best chins in the sport. However he was very inactive in the ring and lost by unanimous decision. He was heavily criticized by the fans after the fight. Ignashov announced that he wants to have a rubber match with Badr Hari after he has a few more K-1 fights to get used to the big ring again. Just recently he competed in his 99 official fight while winning with Freddy Kemayo. He made his comeback after one year at 12 May 2012 in Budapest Hungary losing a decision against Ali Cenik.

He defeated Zinedine Hameur-Lain via decision in Kazan, Russian on 20 October 2012. Just a week later, he was defeated by Tomáš Hron by unanimous decision at Nitrianska Noc Bojovnikov in Nitra, Slovakia.

He was scheduled to fight Benjamin Adegbuyi on 10 November 2012 in Craiova, Romania, in the quarter-finals of the SuperKombat World Grand Prix 2012 Final Elimination. Unfortunately, due a broken finger he had to pull out of the event.

On 23 February 2013, he defeated the overmatched Martynas Knyzlis on points in Moscow, Russia.

Ignashov had his rubber match with Badr Hari at Legend 2: Invasion in Moscow on 9 November 2013, losing by unanimous decision in yet another lackluster fight.

Ignashov was slated to fight Andonis "Wrangler" Tzoros in Greece for the WKN K-1 Super Heavyweight Championship on 26 April 2015. Ignashov defeated Tzoros and won the WKN title via decision.

== Titles ==
=== Professional ===
- World Kickboxing Network
  - 2015 WKN International K-1 Rules Super-heavyweight Championship
- K-1
  - 2003 K-1 World Grand Prix 2003 in Paris Champion
  - 2001 K-1 World Grand Prix 2001 in Nagoya Champion
  - 2000 K-1 Belarus Grand Prix 2000 Champion
- International Sport Karate Association
  - 2000 ISKA World Heavyweight Champion
  - 1999 ISKA World Heavyweight Champion
- World Muaythai Council
  - 2000 WMC Muay Thai World Heavyweight Champion
  - 1999 WMC Muay Thai World Heavyweight Champion
- World Professional Kickboxing League
  - 2000 WPKL Muay Thai European Champion

=== Amateur ===
- 1999 I.A.M.T.F. Amateur Muay Thai World Championships (gold) -91 kg
- 1997 European Amateur Muay Thai Heavyweight Champion (gold) -91 kg

== Kickboxing record (incomplete) ==
Kickboxing record (incomplete)
86 wins (41 (T)KOs, 43 decisions), 22 losses
Date	Result	Opponent	Event	Location	Method	Round	Time
2018-05-30	Loss	(Romania) Valentin Bordianu	Zhara Fight Show	Moscow, Russia	Decision (unanimous)	3	3:00
2018-04-06	Win	(Bosnia and Herzegovina) Dževad Poturak	Bellator Kickboxing 9	Hungary	Decision (split)	3	3:00
2015-04-26	Win	(Greece) Antonis Tzoros	The Battle	Athens, Greece	Decision	3	3:00
Wins the WKN International K-1 Rules Super-heavyweight Championship.
2013-11-09	Loss	(Morocco) Badr Hari	Legend 2: Invasion	Moscow, Russia	Decision (unanimous)	3	3:00
2013-02-22	Win	(Lithuania) Martnyas Knyzlis	Knockout Show	Moscow, Russia	Decision	3	3:00
2012-10-27	Loss	(Czech Republic) Tomáš Hron	Nitrianska Noc Bojovnikov	Nitra, Slovakia	Decision (unanimous)	3	3:00
2012-10-20	Win	(Algeria) Zinedine Hameur-Lain	Tatneft Arena World Cup 2012 Final	Kazan, Russia	Decision (unanimous)	3	3:00
2012-07-07	Win	(Romania) Corneliu Rus	SUPERKOMBAT World Grand Prix III 2012, Super Fight	Varna, Bulgaria	Decision (unanimous)	3	3:00
2012-05-12	Loss	(Turkey) Ali Cenik	Fight Code Dragons Final 32, Prestige Fight	Budapest, Hungary	Decision (unanimous)	3	3:00
2011-02-05	Win	(Czech Republic) Roman Kleibl	Fight Code Rhinos Series	Nitra, Slovakia	Decision	3	3:00
2010-12-11	Loss	(Czech Republic) Tomáš Hron	Yiannis Evgenikos presents: It's Showtime Athens	Athens, Greece	Decision (4–1)	3	3:00
2010-05-21	Win	(France) Freddy Kemayo	K-1 World Grand Prix 2010 in Bucharest Semi Finals	Bucharest, Romania	Decision (unanimous)	3	3:00
Despite victory could not continue in tournament due to injury.
2010-05-21	Win	(Lithuania) Mindaugas Sakalauskas	K-1 World Grand Prix 2010 in Bucharest Quarter Finals	Bucharest, Romania	KO	1	1:57
2010-04-03	Loss	(Morocco) Badr Hari	K-1 World Grand Prix 2010 in Yokohama	Yokohama, Japan	Decision (unanimous)	3	3:00
2009-10-24	Win	(United States) Ron Sparks	K-1 ColliZion 2009 Final Elimination	Arad, Romania	KO (right high kick)	2	2:13
2009-10-17	Loss	(Netherlands) Semmy Schilt	Ultimate Glory 11: A Decade of Fights	Amsterdam, Netherlands	Decision (unanimous)	3	3:00
2009-06-26	Loss	(France) Freddy Kemayo	Gala International Multi-boxes à Coubertin	Paris, France	TKO (doctor stoppage/shin injury)	4	2:00
2009-05-16	Loss	(Czech Republic) Roman Kleibl	K-1 ColliZion 2009 Mladá Boleslav	Mladá Boleslav, Czech Republic	Ext.R decision (unanimous)	4	3:00
2009-02-28	Win	(Bosnia and Herzegovina) Dževad Poturak	K-1 Rules Tournament 2009 in Budapest	Budapest, Hungary	Ext.R decision (unanimous)	4	3:00
2008-10-05	Win	(Switzerland) Björn Bregy	K.O. Events "Tough Is Not Enough"	Rotterdam, Netherlands	Decision (unanimous)	3	3:00
2008-03-30	Win	(South Korea) Yang Rae Yoo	The Khan 1	Seoul, South Korea	Decision (majority)	3	3:00
2008-02-09	Loss	(France) Gregory Tony	KO World Series 2008 Auckland	Auckland, New Zealand	Decision (unanimous)	3	3:00
2007-02-24	Win	(Hungary) Attila Karacs	K-1 European League 2007 Hungary	Budapest, Hungary	KO (left cross)	1	2:02
2006-08-12	Win	(United States) Imani Lee	K-1 World Grand Prix 2006 in Las Vegas II Quarter Finals	Las Vegas, Nevada, USA	Decision (split)	3	3:00
Despite victory could not continue in tournament due to injury.
2006-05-13	Loss	(Turkey) Gokhan Saki	K-1 World Grand Prix 2006 in Amsterdam Semi Finals	Amsterdam, Netherlands	Decision (unanimous)	3	3:00
2006-05-13	Win	(Czech Republic) Petr Vondráček	K-1 World Grand Prix 2006 in Amsterdam Quarter Finals	Amsterdam, Netherlands	KO (right cross)	2	2:08
2006-02-25	Win	(Trinidad and Tobago) Gary Goodridge	K-1 European League 2006 in Budapest	Budapest, Hungary	Decision	3	3:00
2005-09-23	Loss	(Netherlands) Remy Bonjasky	K-1 World Grand Prix 2005 in Osaka – Final Elimination	Osaka, Japan	Ext.R decision (unanimous)	4	3:00
Fails to qualify for K-1 World Grand Prix 2005.
2005-05-27	Loss	(Japan) Noboru Uchida	K-1 World Grand Prix 2005 in Paris	Paris, France	Decision (majority)	3	3:00
2005-04-30	Loss	(Australia) Peter Graham	K-1 Battle of Anzacs II	Auckland, New Zealand	2nd ext.R decision (unanimous)	5	3:00
2005-02-13	Loss	(Switzerland) Bjorn Bregy	Mix Fight Gala	Alkmaar, Netherlands	TKO (knee injury)	3	3:00
2004-11-06	Win	(Poland) Paul Slowinski	Titans 1st	Kitakyushu, Japan	Decision (unanimous)	3	3:00
2004-09-25	Loss	(Thailand) Kaoklai Kaennorsing	K-1 World Grand Prix 2004 Final Elimination	Tokyo, Japan	Ext.R decision (split)	4	3:00
Fails to qualify for K-1 World Grand Prix 2004.
2004-07-16	Win	(Croatia) Josip Bodrozic	Kings of Oceania 2004	Auckland, New Zealand	KO	1	N/A
2004-06-06	Win	(United States) Arthur Williams	K-1 World Grand Prix 2004 in Nagoya	Nagoya, Japan	KO (low kicks)	1	1:48
2004-05-20	Win	(Netherlands) Semmy Schilt	It's Showtime 2004 Amsterdam	Amsterdam, Netherlands	KO (left knee strike)	1	1:20
2004-04-11	Win	(France) Cyrille Diabate	MT ONE	Saint-Pierre, Réunion	Decision	5	3:00
2004-03-27	Win	(United States) Carter Williams	K-1 World Grand Prix 2004 in Saitama	Saitama, Japan	KO (knee strike)	2	2:42
2004-10-31	Win	(Belgium) Marc de Wit	K-1 Marseilles 2004 World Qualification	Marseilles, France	Decision (unanimous)	3	3:00
2003-12-06	Loss	(Netherlands) Peter Aerts	K-1 World Grand Prix 2003 Quarter Finals	Tokyo, Japan	Ext.R decision (unanimous)	4	3:00
2003-10-31	Win	(Croatia) Josip Bodrozic	K-1 Final Fight Stars War in Zagreb	Zagreb, Croatia	Decision (split)	5	3:00
2003-10-11	Win	(South Africa) Mike Bernardo	K-1 World Grand Prix 2003 Final Elimination	Osaka, Japan	KO (right punch and right low kick)	2	2:21
Qualifies for K-1 World Grand Prix 2003.
2003-07-13	Win	(South Africa) Jan Nortje	K-1 World Grand Prix 2003 in Fukuoka	Fukuoka, Japan	KO (low kicks)	1	2:49
2003-06-14	Win	(France) Cyril Abidi	K-1 World Grand Prix 2003 in Paris Final	Paris, France	TKO (corner stoppage)	3	0:20
Wins K-1 World Grand Prix 2003 in Paris and qualifies for K-1 World Grand Prix 2003 Final Elimination.
2003-06-14	Win	(Russia) Alexander Ustinov	K-1 World Grand Prix 2003 in Paris Semi Finals	Paris, France	Decision (split)	3	3:00
2003-06-14	Win	(Czech Republic) Pavel Majer	K-1 World Grand Prix 2003 in Paris Quarter Finals	Paris, France	KO	3	N/A
2003-06-08	Win	(Morocco) Badr Hari	It's Showtime 2003 Amsterdam	Amsterdam, Netherlands	KO (right cross)	3	2:55
2002-10-05	Loss	(Germany) Stefan Leko	K-1 World Grand Prix 2002 Final Elimination	Saitama, Japan	Ext.R decision (unanimous)	4	3:00
Fails to qualify for K-1 World Grand Prix 2002.
2002-07-14	Win	(Netherlands) Peter Aerts	K-1 World Grand Prix 2002 in Fukuoka	Fukuoka, Japan	Decision (majority)	5	3:00
2002-05-25	Win	(Switzerland) Björn Bregy	K-1 World Grand Prix 2002 in Paris	Paris, France	KO (kick)	5	2:12
2002-02-24	Win	(Japan) Nobu Hayashi	K-1 World Grand Prix 2002 Preliminary Netherlands	Arnhem, Netherlands	Decision (unanimous)	5	3:00
2001-10-21	Loss	(Brazil) Francisco Filho	K-1 World Grand Prix 2001 Semi Finals	Tokyo, Japan	Decision (unanimous)	3	3:00
2001-10-21	Win	(Denmark) Nicholas Pettas	K-1 World Grand Prix 2001 Quarter Finals	Tokyo, Japan	KO (right knee)	2	1:21
2001-10-21	Loss	(Netherlands) Jerrel Venetiaan	It's Showtime - Original	Haarlem, Netherlands	Decision	5	3:00
2001-07-20	Win	(Netherlands) Lloyd van Dams	K-1 World Grand Prix 2001 in Nagoya Final	Nagoya, Japan	Ext.R decision (unanimous)	4	3:00
Wins K-1 World Grand Prix 2001 in Nagoya and qualifies for K-1 World Grand Prix 2001.
2001-07-20	Win	(South Africa) Andrew Thomson	K-1 World Grand Prix 2001 in Nagoya Semi Finals	Nagoya, Japan	KO (left punch)	1	1:46
2001-07-20	Win	(Switzerland) Petar Majstorovic	K-1 World Grand Prix 2001 in Nagoya Quarter Finals	Nagoya, Japan	Decision (unanimous)	3	3:00
2001-04-21	Win	(Greece) Paris Vasilikos	K-1 Italy Grand Prix 2001 Preliminary	Milan, Italy	TKO (jaw injury)	3	3:00
2001-02-04	Loss	(Germany) Stefan Leko	K-1 Holland GP 2001 in Arnhem	Arnhem, Netherlands	DQ	5	3:00
2000-12-12	Win	(Netherlands) Lloyd van Dams	It's Showtime - Christmas Edition	Haarlem, Netherlands	TKO (exhaustion)	5	3:00
2000-08-20	Loss	(United Kingdom) Matt Skelton	K-1 World Grand Prix 2000 in Yokohama Quarter Finals	Yokohama, Japan	Decision (unanimous)	3	3:00
2000-06-24	Win	(Belarus) Sergey Arhipov	K-1 Belarus Grand Prix 2000 Final	Minsk, Belarus	TKO	3	N/A
Wins K-1 Belarus Grand Prix 2000 and qualifies for K-1 World Grand Prix 2000 in Yokohama.
2000-06-24	Win	(Russia) Sergei Matkin	K-1 Belarus Grand Prix 2000 Semi Finals	Minsk, Belarus	KO	2	2:01
2000-06-24	Win	(Lithuania) Darius Grilauskas	K-1 Belarus Grand Prix 2000 Quarter Finals	Minsk, Belarus	KO	1	2:32
2000-06-04	Win	(Belgium) Marc de Wit	Night of Revenge	Haarlem, Netherlands	Decision	5	3:00
2000-05-06	Win	(United Kingdom) Mark Russell	Oktagon	Milan, Italy	N/A	N/A	N/A
Retains I.S.K.A. World Heavyweight title.
2000-03-13	Win	(Sweden) Jörgen Kruth	Night Club "Reaktor"	Minsk, Belarus	Decision (unanimous)	5	3:00
Retains W.M.C. Muay Thai Heavyweight World title.
2000-01-23	Win	(Netherlands) Harry Hooft	Day of No Mercy	Rotterdam, Netherlands	Decision	5	3:00
Wins W.P.K.L Muay Thai 86.13 kg European title.
1999-10-24	Loss	(Netherlands) Rob Kaman	It's Showtime - It's Showtime	Haarlem, Netherlands	Decision	5	3:00
1999-07-29	Win	(Sweden) Jörgen Kruth	Rajamangala Stadium	Bangkok, Thailand	KO	2	N/A
Wins W.M.C. Muay Thai Heavyweight World title.
1998-04-26	Win	(Netherlands) Remy Bonjasky	W.P.K.L. Muay Thai Fight Night	Libiąż, Poland	Decision (unanimous)	5	3:00
Legend: Win Loss Draw/no contest Notes

Amateur Muay Thai record (incomplete)
Date	Result	Opponent	Event	Location	Method	Round	Time
1999-03-13	Win	(Sweden) Jorgan Himmerstall	I.A.M.T.F World Muay thai Championships, final	Bangkok, Thailand			
Wins I.A.M.T.F World Muay thai Championships Gold medal (-91 kg).
1999-03-11	Win	(Romania) Daniel Ghiţă	I.A.M.T.F World Muay thai Championships, semi final	Bangkok, Thailand	Decision	4	2:00
1999-03-10	Win	(Czech Republic) Luboš Vaňata	I.A.M.T.F World Muay thai Championships, quarter final	Bangkok, Thailand			
Legend: Win Loss Draw/no contest Notes

== Mixed martial arts record ==
Professional record breakdown
3 matches	1 win	1 loss
By knockout	1	0
By submission	0	1
No contests	1	

Res.	Record	Opponent	Method	Event	Date	Round	Time	Location	Notes
Loss	1–1 (1)	(Japan) Shinsuke Nakamura	Submission (forearm choke)	K-1 MMA ROMANEX	22 May 2004	2	1:51	Saitama, Japan	
Win	1–0 (1)	(United States) Steve Williams	KO (knees)	K-1 Beast 2004 in Niigata	14 March 2004	1	0:22	Niigata, Japan	
NC	0–0 (1)	(Japan) Shinsuke Nakamura	NC (overturned)	K-1 PREMIUM 2003 Dynamite!!	31 December 2003	3	1:19	Nagoya, Japan	

== See also ==
- List of K-1 champions
- List of male kickboxers
