= Jörgen Kruth =

Swedish kickboxer and MMA fighter (born 1974)

- Born: Jörgen Ingmar Kruth; May 8, 1974 (age 52); Stockholm, Sweden
- Other names: The Last Viking
- Nationality: Swedish
- Height: 1.88 m (6 ft 2 in)
- Weight: 105 kg (231 lb; 16.5 st)
- Division: Cruiserweight; Heavyweight; Light Heavyweight
- Style: Kickboxing, Muay Thai
- Team: Vallentuna Boxing Camp
- Trainer: Mats Söderström; Po Lindwall (1987-1997)
- Years active: 1987–2012

Professional boxing record
- Total: 1
- Wins: 1
- Losses: 0

Kickboxing record
- Total: 87
- Wins: 71
- By knockout: 31
- Losses: 14
- By knockout: 5
- Draws: 2

Mixed martial arts record
- Total: 5
- Wins: 5
- By knockout: 3
- By submission: 2
- Losses: 0

Other information
- Website: http://www.jorgenkruth.com/
- Boxing record from BoxRec
- Mixed martial arts record from Sherdog
- Last updated on: November 21, 2009

Jörgen Kruth
Medal record

Representing Sweden

Muay Thai

World Championships
Silver medal – second place	1995 Bangkok	−81 kg
Gold medal – first place	1996 Bangkok	−86 kg
Gold medal – first place	1997 Bangkok	−86 kg

Kickboxing

World Championships
Gold medal – first place	1997 Copenhagen	−87.5 kg

Jörgen Ingmar Kruth (born May 8, 1974) is a retired Swedish professional kickboxer and mixed martial artist. He is a former two time World Muay Thai Council Heavyweight Muaythai World Champion. He is considered to be among the greatest Scandinavian kickboxers of all time.

== Biography and career ==
=== Muay Thai career ===
Jörgen started practicing martial arts first time in 1984. He tried Judo and Jujutsu and couple years later switched over to Taekwondo. It was not until 1987 when he came in contact with Muay Thai first time. He started to train under Po Lindwall.

Kruth had his first Muay Thai fight in 1988 at the age of 14. In 1993 he had 3 amateur Boxing bouts and as well as two Savate fights. In 1994, at the age of 19, he became Nordic Muaythai Champion.

In 1995, Kruth participated at IAMTF Amateur World Muay Thai Championships in Bangkok. He worked his way all the way to the final where he lost against a Thai and went home with a silver medal in -81 kg.

In 1996, he became the Amateur Muay Thai World Champion for the first time and defended this title in 1997 as well.

In 1997 Jörgen changed his training center to his current club, Vallentuna Boxing Camp (VBC) and a year later turned pro. He won his first two professional fights by KO at the famous Rajadamnern Stadium in Bangkok and became WKA Muay Thai Cruiserweight World Champion.

In 1999 Jörgen Kruth fought in Japan for the first time and won by KO. He followed up his strong debut by knocking out all three opponents in the same night at K-1 World GP tournament in Zagreb.

In 2004, Kruth became the WMC Heavyweight Muay Thai World Champion defeating Polish-Australian Paul Slowinski. In February 2005, he defended his title against Sergei Gur from Belarus,

=== MMA career ===
Kruth made his professional MMA debut in April 2009. He amassed an undefeated record of 5 wins over the next couple of years with none of his fights having reached the second round.

Kruth was expected to make his UFC debut on April 14, 2012 against Cyrille Diabaté at UFC on Fuel TV 2. However, Kruth was forced out of the bout with an injury and replaced by Tom DeBlass.

Kruth was expected to finally make his UFC debut against Fabio Maldonado on September 29, 2012 at UFC on Fuel TV 5 in Nottingham, England. However it was reported on September 7, 2012 that Kruth dropped out of his fight with Maldonado to retire from combat sports.

== Titles ==
- Professional
  - 2004 WMC Superheavyweight Muay Thai World Champion
  - 2004 K-1 Italy Champion
  - 2003 K-1 World Grand Prix Preliminary Holland Champion
  - 2001 K-1 Holland GP in Arnhem Runner Up
  - 2000 K-1 Grand Prix Europe Champion
  - 1998 WKA Muaythai Cruiserweight World Champion
- Amateur
  - 1997 WKA Amateur World Championships, Copenhagen, Denmark (gold)
  - 1997 IAMTF World Amateur Muaythai Championships, Bangkok, Thailand (gold)
  - 1996 IAMTF World Amateur Muaythai Champion, Bangkok, Thailand (gold)
  - 1995 IAMTF World Amateur Muaythai World Champion, Bangkok, Thailand (silver) (-81 kg)
  - 1994 Nordic Muay Thai Champion

== Kickboxing record ==
Kickboxing record
71 Wins (32 (T)KO's, 39 Decisions), 14 Losses
Date	Result	Opponent	Event	Location	Method	Round	Time
2010-11-27	Win	(United States) Bob Sapp	K-1 Scandinavia Rumble of the Kings 2010	Stockholm, Sweden	TKO (Corner stoppage/left knee strike)	1	1:19
2007-05-20	Win	(France) Freddy Kemayo	K-1 Scandinavia 2007	Stockholm, Sweden	Decision (Unanimous)	3	3:00
2006-12-16	Loss	(Bosnia and Herzegovina) Dzevad Poturak	K-1 Fighting Network Prague Round '07	Prague, Czech Republic	Decision (Unanimous)	3	3:00
2006-11-24	Win	(Switzerland) Azem Maksutaj	K-1 World MAX North European Qualification 2007	Stockholm, Sweden	KO (Knee)	1	1:30
2006-05-20	Win	(South Africa) Francois Botha	K-1 Scandinavia Grand Prix 2006	Stockholm, Sweden	Decision (Unanimous)	3	3:00
2005-12-18	Loss	(Bosnia and Herzegovina) Dzevad Poturak	Heaven or Hell 5	Prague, Czech Republic	Decision (Unanimous)	3	3:00
2005-02-19	Win	(Belarus) Sergei Gur	SM Thaiboxing Gala	Stockholm, Sweden	Decision (Unanimous)	5	3:00
Retains WMC Muaythai World Heavyweight title.
2004-12-19	Win	(Croatia) Ivica Perkovic	Heaven or Hell 4	Prague, Czech Republic	TKO	2	
2004-09-05	Win	(Australia) Paul Slowinski	SM Thaiboxing Gala	Stockholm, Sweden	Decision (Unanimous)	5	3:00
Wins WMC Muaythai World Heavyweight title.
2004-08-07	Loss	(Belgium) Brecht Wallis	K-1 World Grand Prix 2004 in Las Vegas II	Las Vegas, Nevada	Decision (Unanimous)	3	3:00
2004-08-07	Win	(New Zealand) Rony Sefo	K-1 World Grand Prix 2004 in Las Vegas II	Las Vegas, Nevada	Decision (Unanimous)	3	3:00
2004-04-24	Win	(Belarus) Vitali Akhramenko	K-1 Italy Grand Prix 2004 in Milan	Milan, Italy	Decision (Unanimous)	3	3:00
Wins K-1 Italy Grand Prix 2004 in Milan tournament title.
2004-04-24	Win	(Croatia) Josip Bodrozic	K-1 Italy Grand Prix 2004 in Milan	Milan, Italy	KO (Right overhand)	3	2:59
2004-04-24	Win	(Croatia) Ivica Perkovic	K-1 Italy Grand Prix 2004 in Milan	Milan, Italy	TKO (Ref. stop/three knockdowns)	2	2:30
2004-02-14	Win	(Belarus) Vitali Akhramenko	K-1 Scandinavia 2004 World Qualification	Stockholm, Sweden	Decision (Unanimous)	3	3:00
2003-06-15	Loss	(Australia) Paul Slowinski	Knees of Fury IV	Adelaide, Australia	TKO (Doc. stop/elbow)	1	
2003-05-30	Loss	(Switzerland) Xhavit Bajrami	K-1 World Grand Prix 2003 in Basel	Basel, Switzerland	Ext. R Decision (Split)	4	3:00
2003-04-06	Win	(Morocco) Samir Benazzouz	K-1 Holland Grand Prix 2003	Zoetermeer, Netherlands	Decision (Unanimous)	3	3:00
Wins K-1 Holland Grand Prix 2003 tournament title.
2003-04-06	Win	(Belarus) Andrei Zuravkov	K-1 Holland Grand Prix 2003	Zoetermeer, Netherlands	Ext.R Decision (Majority)	4	3:00
2003-04-06	Loss	(Belgium) Brecht Wallis	K-1 Holland Grand Prix 2003	Zoetermeer, Netherlands	Ext.R Decision (Majority)	4	3:00
2003-03-15	Win	(Belarus) Vitali Akhramenko	K-1 World Grand Prix 2003 Preliminary Scandinavia	Stockholm, Sweden	Decision (Unanimous)	5	3:00
2003-02-22	Win	(Japan) Ryuto Noji	Ichigeki Tokyo	Tokyo, Japan	Decision (Unanimous)	5	3:00
2002-03-03	Loss	(South Africa) Jan Nortje	K-1 World Grand Prix 2002 in Nagoya	Nagoya, Japan	KO (Left punch)	2	1:38
2001-08-11	Loss	(United States) Maurice Smith	K-1 World Grand Prix 2001 in Las Vegas	Las Vegas, Nevada	Decision (Unanimous)	3	3:00
2001-06-09	Loss	(France) Gregory Tony	K-1 World Grand Prix 2001 Preliminary Scandinavia	Copenhagen, Denmark	Disqualification	3	2:38
2001-03-17	Win	(Germany) Stefan Leko	K-1 Gladiators 2001	Yokohama, Japan	KO (Right hook)	2	2:19
2001-02-04	Loss	(Netherlands) Jerrel Venetiaan	K-1 Holland GP 2001 in Arnhem	Arnhem, Netherlands	TKO (Doctor stoppage)	1	
Fight was for K-1 Holland GP 2001 in Arnhem tournament title.
2001-02-04	Win	(Belgium) Marc de Wit	K-1 Holland GP 2001 in Arnhem	Arnhem, Netherlands	Decision (Unanimous)	3	3:00
2001-02-04	Win	(Hungary) Peter Varga	K-1 Holland GP 2001 in Arnhem	Arnhem, Netherlands	KO (High kick)	2	
2000-10-09	Loss	(South Africa) Mike Bernardo	K-1 World Grand Prix 2000 in Fukuoka	Fukuoka, Japan	KO (Right overhand)	1	2:24
2000-09-01	Win	(Albania) Xhavit Bajrami	K-1 Grand Prix Europe 2000	Zagreb, Croatia	KO (High kick)	3	
Wins K-1 Grand Prix Europe 2000 tournament title.
2000-09-01	Win	(Croatia) Drazo Orduri	K-1 Grand Prix Europe 2000	Zagreb, Croatia	KO (Knees)	1	
2000-09-01	Win	(Italy) Tony Katoni	K-1 Grand Prix Europe 2000	Zagreb, Croatia	KO (Punch)	1	
2000-03-13	Loss	(Belarus) Alexey Ignashov	Night Club "Reaktor"	Minsk, Belarus	Decision (Unanimous)	5	3:00
Fight was for WMC Muaythai World Heavyweight title.
1999-08-15	Loss	(Belarus) Alexey Ignashov	Queen's Birthday, Rajamangala Stadium	Bangkok, Thailand	KO	2	
Fight was for WMC Muaythai World Heavyweight title.
1998	Win				KO	1	
Wins WKA Muaythai World Cruiserweight title.
1998	Win		Rajadamnern Stadium	Bangkok, Thailand	KO		
1998	Win		Rajadamnern Stadium	Bangkok, Thailand	KO		
1994-12-03	Win		Novahalli	Helsinki, Finland	Decision (Unanimous)	5	3:00

Boxing record
1 Win (0 (T) KO's, 1 decisions), 0 Losses
Date	Result	Opponent	Location	Method	Round	Time	Record
2004-04-17	Win	(Slovakia) Marek Zelo	Baltic Hall, Mariehamn, Finland	Decision (Unanimous)	4	3:00	1-0
Legend: Win Loss Draw/No contest Notes

== Mixed martial arts record ==
Professional record breakdown
5 matches	5 wins	0 losses
By knockout	3	0
By submission	2	0
By decision	0	0
By disqualification	0	0
Unknown	0	0
Draws	0	
No contests	0	

Res.	Record	Opponent	Method	Event	Date	Round	Time	Location	Notes
Win	5-0	Yusuke Kawaguchi	TKO (punches and elbows)	Rumble of the Kings 6	November 26, 2011	1	3:18	Stockholm, Sweden	
Win	4-0	Tadas Sapoka	TKO (submission to punches)	International Fighting Arena 2	October 23, 2011	1	0:38	Uppsala, Sweden	
Win	3-0	Jaime Fletcher	TKO (punches)	K-1 Rumble of the Kings 2009 in Stockholm	November 21, 2009	1	4:25	Stockholm, Sweden	
Win	2-0	Tadas Levickas	Submission (triangle choke)	K-1 Rumble of the Kings Qualification 2009 Malmö	May 22, 2009	1	0:50	Malmö, Sweden	
Win	1-0	Arturas Liutika	TKO (punches)	World Freefight Challenge 8 "D-Day"	April 18, 2009	1	0:35	Ljubljana, Slovenia	

== See also ==
- Muay Thai
- List of K-1 events
- List of male kickboxers
