= Alexander Ustinov =

Russian martial artist

Alexander Ustinov Александр Устинов
- Born: Aleksandr Ustinov; 7 December 1976 (age 49); Novosibirsk, Russian SFSR, Soviet Union
- Other names: The Great
- Nationality: Russian
- Height: 2.02 m (6 ft 7.5 in)
- Division: Heavyweight
- Style: Boxing, Kickboxing
- Stance: Orthodox
- Years active: 2001–2007 (kickboxing); 2004–2007 (MMA); 2005–present (boxing)

Professional boxing record
- Total: 43
- Wins: 36
- By knockout: 27
- Losses: 6
- By knockout: 5
- Draws: 1

Kickboxing record
- Total: 64
- Wins: 53
- By knockout: 31
- Losses: 9
- Draws: 1
- No contests: 1

Mixed martial arts record
- Total: 3
- Wins: 1
- Losses: 2
- Last updated on: 28 November 2020

Alexander "Sasha" Ustinov (Russian: Александр Устинов; born 7 December 1976) is a Russian professional boxer, former kickboxer and mixed martial artist. In boxing, he has challenged once for the WBA (Regular) heavyweight title in 2017.

== Kickboxing career ==
In 2003 after winning K-1 Moscow Grand Pix with three consecutive KO's Alexander Ustinov earned his spot at the K-1 World Grand Prix 2003 in Paris. In quarter finals he met Gregory Tony and won the fight by a second-round TKO. In the semi-final he stepped into the ring against his own sparring partner Alexey Ignashov and after the hard-fought battle the judges ruled the fight for Ignashov's favor.

In December 2003 he continued his strong performances at the tournaments winning the K-1 Spain GP in Barcelona.

On 7 August 2004 Alexander Ustinov was invited to participate at K-1 World GP 2004 Battle of Bellagio II. On his biggest tournament of his career, he was matched up against the towering South African fighter Jan "The Giant" Nortje. Alexander Ustinov won the battle but unfortunately was unable to continue due to a deep laceration on his shin and was replaced by the American Scott Lighty.

In 2005 he won two more K-1 tournaments in Milan, Italy and Lommel, Belgium as well as made his professional boxing debut.

== Professional boxing career ==
Alexander Ustinov made his professional boxing debut on 13 May 2005 at the age of 29. He scored a second-round TKO win in his first bout. On 26 February 2009, he won the EBF heavyweight title by stopping Ukrainian Maksym Pedyura in five rounds. Ustinov made two successful defences of that title against Italian Paolo Vidoz and Russian Denis Bakhtov. In his 19th professional contest he defeated American future heavyweight title challenger Monte Barrett by unanimous decision.

=== Usitnov vs. Pulev ===
Ustinov suffered his first defeat in his 28th contest to Bulgarian Kubrat Pulev via 11th-round knockout in September 2009.

=== Ustinov vs. Tua ===
In 2013, he scored the biggest win of his career by outpointing hard punching New Zealander-Samoan David Tua, which was the final fight of Tua's career as he announced his retirement after the fight.

=== Ustinov vs. Charr ===
On 25 November 2017, he unsuccessfully challenged for the WBA (Regular) heavyweight title, losing a unanimous decision to Syrian Mahmoud Charr.

On 26 July 2014, he was to scheduled to fight Tyson Fury as a late replacement for the injured Derek Chisora. However, Tyson Fury pulled out of the fight due to the ill health and eventual death of his uncle, Hughie Fury.

=== Ustinov vs. Hunter ===
On 24 November 2018, Ustinov faced Michael Hunter. Hunter scored two knockdowns over Ustinov and won the fight via TKO in the ninth round.

=== Ustinov vs. Joyce ===
On 18 May 2019, Ustinov faced WBC #15 at heavyweight, Joe Joyce. Joyce's power was too much for Ustinov, as Joyce dominated him en route to a third-round TKO victory.

== Personal life ==
Ustinov currently resides in Minsk, Belarus, but remains a Russian citizen and competes under the Russian flag.

== Kickboxing record ==
53 Wins (31 (T)KO's, 22 decisions), 9 Losses, 1 Draw, 1 No Contest
Date	Result	Opponent	Event	Method	Round	Time
30 November 2007	Win	(Switzerland) Xhavit Bajrami	Battle of Champions, Moscow, Russia	Decision	3	3:00
14 April 2007	Win	Matt Samoa	Kings of Oceania 2007, Auckland, New Zealand	KO	2	1:45
18 November 2006	Win	(Australia) Chris Chrispoulides	K-1 Kings of Oceania 2006 Round 3, Auckland, New Zealand	KO (Left hook)	1	2:13
28 October 2006	Win	(Montenegro) Mirko Vlahovic	Ichigeki Bulgaria 2006, Sofia, Bulgaria	KO (Straight punch)	2	1:30
10 August 2006	Win	(Netherlands) Lloyd van Dams	The Battle of Arnhem V, Arnhem, Netherlands	Decision	5	3:00
30 September 2006	Win	(Czech Republic) Pavel Majer	Kick Boxing in Russia, Moscow	KO	1	
23 August 2006	Win	(Russia) Evgeny Orlov	Belorechensk Fight Night 2	KO	1	
6 July 2006	Win	(Kazakhstan) Teodor Sariyev	IFMA, Amateur Muaythai World Championships, Bangkok	Decision	5	2:00
6 March 2006	Win	(Ukraine) Serhiy Arkhipov	IFMA, Amateur Muaythai World Championships, Bangkok	Decision	5	2:00
29 April 2006	Win	(Australia) Paul Slowinski	MARS World Fighting GP in Seoul, Korea	KO	2	2:55
4 July 2006	Win	(Bulgaria) Alben Belinski	The Bulgarian Kick Gala, Sofia, Bulgaria	Decision	5	3:00
17 February 2006	NC	(Switzerland) Bjorn Bregy	K-1 European League 2006 in Bratislava, Slovakia	No contest		
20 January 2006	Win	(France) Brice Guidon	K-1 Fighting Network 2006 in Marseilles, France	KO	1	0:35
Wins the K-1 Fighting Network 2006 in Marseilles Tournament.
20 January 2006	Win	(France) Christophe Carron	K-1 Fighting Network 2006 in Marseilles, France	TKO	2	
20 January 2006	Win	(Croatia) Alexander Novovic	K-1 Fighting Network 2006 in Marseilles, France	Decision	3	3:00
12 October 2005	Win	(Suriname) Ashwin Balrak	Fights at the Border IV, Lommel, Belgium	Decision	3	3:00
Wins the Fights at the Border IV Tournament.
12 October 2005	Win	(Netherlands) Koos Wessels	Fights at the Border IV, Lommel, Belgium	KO	2	
12 October 2005	Win	(Belgium) Sebastien Van Thielen	Fights at the Border IV, Lommel, Belgium	TKO	2	
2 October 2005	Win	(Belgium) Brecht Wallis	The Battle of Arnhem IV, Arnhem, Netherlands	KO	1	
16 September 2005	Draw	(Romania) Ionuţ Iftimoaie	Local Kombat 16 "Liga Campionilor", Cluj Napoca, Romania	Decision draw	5	3:00
6 July 2005	Loss	(Kyrgyzstan) Ruslan Avasov	Stadium "Spartacus" tournament, Bishkek, Kyrgyzstan			
For the Stadium Spartacus tournament title.
6 July 2005	Win	(Belarus) Eduard Voznovich	Stadium "Spartacus" tournament, Bishkek, Kyrgyzstan			
6 July 2005	Win	(Belarus) Andrei Zuravkov	Stadium "Spartacus" tournament, Bishkek, Kyrgyzstan			
5 June 2005	Win	(Croatia) Mladen Brestovac	K-1 Slovakia 2005, Bratislava	KO		
20 April 2005	Loss	(Belarus) Eduard Voznovich	Arbat Fight Club, WBKF, Moscow, Russia	Decision	3	3:00
16 April 2005	Win	(France) Freddy Kemayo	K-1 Italy 2005 Oktagon, Milano, Italy	Decision	3	3:00
Wins the K-1 Italy 2005 Oktagon tournament.
16 April 2005	Win	(France) Gregory Tony	K-1 Italy 2005 Oktagon, Milano, Italy	Decision	3	3:00
16 April 2005	Win	(Switzerland) Bjorn Bregy	K-1 Italy 2005 Oktagon, Milano, Italy	TKO	1	3:00
2 May 2005	Loss	(Belgium) Brecht Wallis	Total Kombat 3, Romania	Decision	5	3:00
12/00/2004	Win	(Czech Republic) Pavel Majer	Moscow, Russia	KO		
9 November 2004	Win	(Serbia) Duško Basrak	Local Kombat 9, Romania	KO	4	
8 July 2004	Win	(South Africa) Jan Nortje	K-1 World Grand Prix 2004 in Las Vegas II, NV	Decision (Unanimous)	3	3:00
7 January 2004	Win	(United States) Jeff Ford	Minsk, Belarus	KO	1	
29 May 2004	Loss	(Netherlands) Lloyd van Dams	King of the Ring World GP, Venice, Italy	Decision (Split)	3	3:00
29 May 2004	Win	(Egypt) Mohammed Fowzi	King of the Ring World GP, Venice, Italy	KO (High kick)	2	
15 May 2004	Win	(Belarus) Andrei Zuravkov	K-1 Poland 2004, Poland	Decision (Unanimous)	3	3:00
Wins the K-1 Poland 2004 tournament.
15 May 2004	Win	(Ukraine) Serhiy Arkhipov	K-1 Poland 2004, Poland	Decision (Unanimous)	3	3:00
15 May 2004	Win	(Lithuania) Mindaugas Kalikauskas	K-1 Poland 2004, Poland	Decision (Unanimous)	3	3:00
5 February 2004	Win	(Romania) Aurel Bococi	WKN Championships, Daugavpils, Latvia	KO	1	
24 December 2003	Win	(Kyrgyzstan) Ruslan Avasov	WKBF Golden Panther Cup Final (+91 kg) @ Club Arbat, Moscow, Russia	KO (Right liver shot)	6	1:00
20 December 2003	Win	(Switzerland) Petar Majstorovic	K-1 Spain Grand Prix 2003 in Barcelona, Spain	KO	3	2:28
Wins the K-1 Spain Grand Prix 2003 in Barcelona tournament.
20 December 2003	Win	(United Kingdom) Gary Turner	K-1 Spain Grand Prix 2003 in Barcelona, Spain	Decision (Unanimous)	3	3:00
20 December 2003	Win	(Croatia) Ivica Perkovic	K-1 Spain Grand Prix 2003 in Barcelona, Spain	Decision (Unanimous)	3	3:00
29 October 2003	Win	(Russia) Andrei Kirsanov	WKBF Golden Panther Cup 1/2 Final (+91 kg) @ Club Arbat, Moscow, Russia	Decision	5	2:00
29 October 2003	Win	(Ukraine) Andriy Rybalko	WKBF Golden Panther Cup 1/4 Final (+91 kg) @ Club Arbat, Moscow, Russia	Decision (Unanimous)	3	3:00
7 February 2003	Loss	(Ukraine) Serhiy Arkhipov	Tournament Cup of Gold Bars (over 91 kg), Russia	Decision	5	3:00
7 February 2003	Win	(Russia) Andrei Kirsanov	Tournament Cup of Gold Bars (over 91 kg), Russia	Decision	3	3:00
14 June 2003	Loss	(Belarus) Alexey Ignashov	K-1 World Grand Prix 2003 in Paris, France	Decision (Split)	3	3:00
14 June 2003	Win	(France) Gregory Tony	K-1 World Grand Prix 2003 in Paris, France	KO (Low kicks)	2	2:40
28 May 2003	Win	(Russia) Andrei Kirsanov	K-1 World Grand Prix 2003 Preliminary Moscow, Russia	KO	3	1:32
Wins the K-1 World Grand Prix 2003 Preliminary tournament.
28 May 2003	Win	(Kazakhstan) Ruslan Bisayev	K-1 World Grand Prix 2003 Preliminary Moscow, Russia	KO	2	0:40
28 May 2003	Win	(Belarus) Alexander Mozolev	K-1 World Grand Prix 2003 Preliminary Moscow, Russia	KO	2	0:43
14 March 2003	Win	(Belarus) Eduard Voznovich	IAMTF, Amateur Muaythai World Championships, Bangkok	TKO (Corner stoppage)	4	
19 February 2003	Win	(Russia) Evgeny Orlov	BARS – Cup of Arbat Final (+94 kg)	KO	3	
2 December 2003	Win	(Kazakhstan) Ruslan Bisayev	BARS – Cup of Arbat Semi-finals (+94 kg)	TKO	4	
2 May 2003	Win	(Georgia (country)) David Shvelidze	BARS – Cup of Arbat Quarterfinals (+94 kg)	KO	2	
27 November 2002	Win	(Chechnya) Aslan Khamzatov	BARS – BARS	TKO	4	
31 July 2002	Win	(Kazakhstan) Ruslan Bisayev	BARS – Cup of Arbat Final (+94 kg)	Decision	5	3:00
24 July 2002	Win	(Armenia) Suren Kalachan	BARS – Cup of Arbat Semi-finals (+94 kg)	KO	2	
5 April 2002	Loss	(Russia) Andrei Kirsanov	K-1 World Grand Prix 2002 Preliminary Ukraine, Kyiv	Decision (Unanimous)	3	3:00
5 April 2002	Win	(Ukraine) Yaroslav Zavorotnyi	K-1 World Grand Prix 2002 Preliminary Ukraine, Kyiv	Decision (Unanimous)	3	3:00
12 January 2001	Loss	(Netherlands) Rob Hanneman	K-1 World Grand Prix 2001 Preliminary Prague, Czech Republic	Decision (Unanimous)	3	3:00

== Mixed martial arts record ==
1 Win, 1 Loss.
Date	Result	Opponent	Event	Method	Round
10 November 2017	Loss	(Russia) Kirill Fedorov	Modern Fighting Pankration - AMUR CHALLENGE 12	Decision (Split)	3
23 November 2007	Loss	(Russia) Andrei Zubov	Perm Regional MMA Federation – MMA Professional Cup	Decision (Unanimous)	2
5 June 2004	Win	(Russia) Denis Podolyachin	WSFC 8 – West Siberian Fighting Championship 8	Decision	5

== Professional boxing record ==
43 fights	36 wins	6 losses
By knockout	27	5
By decision	9	1
Draws	1	

No.	Result	Record	Opponent	Type	Round, time	Date	Location	Notes
43	Loss	36–6–1	Ivan Dychko	TKO	1 (10), 2:40	18 Dec 2021	Astana, Kazakhstan	
42	Loss	36–5–1	Vladyslav Sirenko	KO	1 (10), 1:10	10 Sep 2021	Stade Roland Garros, Paris, France	
41	Draw	36–4–1	Terell Jamal Woods	SD	6	27 Mar 2021	InterContinental, Miami, Florida, U.S.	
40	Win	36–4	Tornike Puritchamiashvili	RTD	2 (10), 3:00	26 Jul 2020	DiaMond, Minsk, Belarus	Won vacant WBA interim Asia heavyweight title
39	Win	35–4	Oleksandr Nesterenko	KO	1 (10), 2:26	24 Jul 2019	Korston Club, Moscow, Russia	
38	Loss	34–4	Joe Joyce	TKO	3 (10), 1:55	18 May 2019	Lamex Stadium, Stevenage, England	
37	Loss	34–3	Michael Hunter	TKO	9 (12), 1:52	24 Nov 2018	Casino de Salle Medecin, Monte Carlo, Monaco	For vacant WBA International heavyweight title
36	Loss	34–2	Mahmoud Charr	UD	12	25 Nov 2017	Oberhausen, Germany	For vacant WBA (Regular) heavyweight title
35	Win	34–1	Raphael Zumbano Love	TKO	1 (10), 2:06	19 May 2017	Whites Hotel, Bolton, England	
34	Win	33–1	Konstantin Airich	KO	5 (10), 2:59	12 Dec 2015	VTB Arena, Moscow, Russia	
33	Win	32–1	Maurice Harris	KO	1 (10), 1:05	10 Oct 2015	Poliedro, Caracas, Venezuela	Won vacant WBA International heavyweight title
32	Win	31–1	Travis Walker	TKO	2 (10), 1:36	11 Jul 2015	Manchester Velodrome, Manchester, England	
31	Win	30–1	Chauncy Welliver	UD	8	11 Dec 2014	Krylatskoye Sports Palace, Moscow, Russia	
30	Win	29–1	David Tua	UD	12	16 Nov 2013	Claudelands Arena, Hamilton, New Zealand	Won vacant WBA Pan African heavyweight title
29	Win	28–1	Ivica Perkovic	UD	8	20 Apr 2013	Sports Palace "Lokomotyv", Kharkiv, Ukraine	
28	Loss	27–1	Kubrat Pulev	KO	11 (12), 1:28	29 Sep 2012	Alsterdorfer Sporthalle, Hamburg, Germany	For European and IBF International heavyweight titles
27	Win	27–0	Jason Gavern	KO	7 (12), 2:26	26 Apr 2012	Sports Palace "Lokomotyv", Kharkiv, Ukraine	Won vacant IBO Inter-Continental heavyweight title
26	Win	26–0	Kertson Manswell	TKO	3 (8), 2:18	3 Mar 2012	ESPRIT Arena, Düsseldorf, Germany	
25	Win	25–0	Denis Bakhtov	UD	12	22 Oct 2011	Budivelnik, Cherkasy, Ukraine	Retained EBA heavyweight title
24	Win	24–0	Akmal Aslanov	TKO	2 (8), 1:57	30 Jul 2011	Palace of Sport, Odesa, Ukraine	
23	Win	23–0	Guido Santana	TKO	1 (8), 1:08	28 May 2011	Concert Hall "Kobzov", Kyiv, Ukraine	
22	Win	22–0	Özcan Çetinkaya	TKO	2 (8), 1:15	16 Oct 2010	O2 World, Hamburg, Germany	
21	Win	21–0	Paolo Vidoz	UD	12	26 Jun 2010	Palace of Sport, Odesa, Ukraine	Retained EBA heavyweight title
20	Win	20–0	Ed Mahone	TKO	4 (8), 0:30	20 Mar 2010	ESPRIT Arena, Düsseldorf, Germany	
19	Win	19–0	Monte Barrett	UD	12	12 Dec 2009	PostFinance Arena, Bern, Switzerland	Won vacant WBA International heavyweight title
18	Win	18–0	Andriy Kindrych	TKO	3 (8), 1:15	21 Oct 2009	Palace of Sports, Kyiv, Ukraine	
17	Win	17–0	Talgat Dosanov	TKO	4 (8), 2:55	15 Aug 2009	Dynamo, Grozny, Russia	
16	Win	16–0	Michael Sprott	UD	10	20 Jun 2009	Veltins-Arena, Gelsenkirchen, Germany	
15	Win	15–0	Byron Polley	KO	2 (8), 1:27	21 Mar 2009	Hanns-Martin-Schleyer-Halle, Stuttgart, Germany	
14	Win	14–0	Maksym Pedyura	TKO	5 (12), 1:56	26 Feb 2009	Palace of Sports, Kyiv, Ukraine	Won vacant EBA heavyweight title
13	Win	13–0	Julius Long	KO	1 (8), 2:50	11 Oct 2008	O2 World, Berlin, Germany	
12	Win	12–0	Daniel Bispo	KO	2 (8)	22 Aug 2008	Olympic Village, Beijing, China	
11	Win	11–0	Hans-Jörg Blasko	KO	2 (8), 2:59	12 Jul 2008	Color Line Arena, Hamburg, Germany	
10	Win	10–0	Rudolf Abramyan	UD	8	17 May 2008	Sports Palace "Lokomotyv", Kharkiv, Ukraine	
9	Win	9–0	Sedreck Fields	UD	8	19 Apr 2008	Palace of Sports, Kyiv, Ukraine	
8	Win	8–0	Earl Ladson	TKO	1 (4), 1:59	23 Feb 2008	Madison Square Garden, New York City, New York, US	
7	Win	7–0	Vitali Shkraba	TKO	1 (10)	6 Jul 2007	Arena Gym, Hamburg, Germany	Won vacant German International heavyweight title
6	Win	6–0	Oleksandr Mileiko	TKO	5 (6)	25 Mar 2007	Alsterdorfer Sporthalle, Hamburg, Germany	
5	Win	5–0	Engin Solmaz	TKO	2 (6), 0:53	10 Feb 2007	Grand Elysée Hotel, Hamburg, Germany	
4	Win	4–0	Valeri Meierson	TKO	1 (6), 2:30	25 Dec 2006	Club Reaktor, Minsk, Belarus	
3	Win	3–0	Ryszard Raszkiewicz	TKO	3 (4), 2:26	17 Oct 2006	Hotel Pyramida, Prague, Czech Republic	
2	Win	2–0	Aleh Ramanau	TKO	6 (8)	20 May 2005	Mebelny-3, Minsk, Belarus	
1	Win	1–0	Aleh Tsukanau	TKO	2 (6)	13 May 2005	Mebelny-3, Minsk, Belarus	

== Titles ==
=== Boxing ===
- WBA International heavyweight champion
- EBA (European Boxing Association) heavyweight champion

=== Kickboxing ===
- World Full Contact Association
  - 2006 WFCA Super Heavyweight World title
- International Federation of Muaythai Amateur
  - 2006 IFMA World Amateur Champion
- K-1
  - 2006 K-1 Fighting Network in Marseilles Champion
  - 2005 K-1 Italy Oktagon Champion
  - 2004 K-1 Poland Champion
  - 2003 K-1 Spain Grand Prix in Barcelona Champion
  - 2003 K-1 World Grand Prix Preliminary Moscow Champion
- World Kickboxing Network
  - 2004 WKN European Muay Thai Champion
- World Kickboxing Federation
  - 2003 WKBF Golden Panther Cup (+91 kg) Champion
- International Amateur Muay Thai Federation
  - 2003 IAMTF World Amateur Muay Thai Champion

Sporting positions
Regional boxing titles
Vacant Title last held by Pedro Carrión	German International heavyweight champion 6 July 2007 – March 2008; Vacated	Vacant Title next held by Steffen Kretschmann
New title	EBA heavyweight champion 26 February 2009 – September 2012; Vacated	Vacant Title next held by Sanel Papic
New title	WBA International heavyweight champion 12 December 2009 – March 2010; Vacated	Vacant Title next held by Juan Carlos Gómez
Vacant Title last held by Franklin Lawrence	IBO Inter-Continental heavyweight champion 26 April 2012 – September 2012; Vacated	Vacant Title next held by Gary Cornish
Vacant Title last held by Timur Ibragimov	WBA Pan African heavyweight champion 16 November 2013 – November 2014; Vacated	Vacant Title next held by Kali Meehan
Vacant Title last held by Alexander Petkovic	WBA International heavyweight champion 10 October 2015 – April 2016; Vacated	Vacant Title next held by Eugene Hill
