= Brecht Wallis =

Belgian retired kickboxer (born 1977)

- Born: 6 September 1977 (age 49); Hasselt, Belgium
- Other names: The Gentle Giant
- Nationality: Belgian
- Height: 1.94 m (6 ft 4 in)
- Weight: 116 kg (256 lb; 18.3 st)
- Division: Heavyweight
- Style: Muay Thai
- Fighting out of: Valkenswaard, Netherlands
- Team: Siam Gym
- Trainer: Miki Benazzouz
- Years active: 2001–2007, 2013–present

Kickboxing record
- Total: 41
- Wins: 30
- By knockout: 13
- Losses: 9
- By knockout: 2
- Draws: 2
- Last updated on: 27 April 2014

Brecht "The Gentle Giant" Wallis (born 6 September 1977) is a Belgian retired kickboxer from Houthalen-Oost. He holds notable victories over Jorgen Kruth (twice), Carter Williams, Alexander Ustinov, and Errol Zimmerman.

== Career and biography ==
Brecht Wallis started training in judo at the age of 12 and a few years later moved on to Muay Thai. In 2001 he moved to the Netherlands to pursue his professional career at the Siam Gym under trainer Miki Benazzouz.

He made his K-1 debut in 2003 at K-1 Holland GP in Zoetermeer, winning the bout against Swedish fighter Jorgen Kruth by extra round majority decision.

On 14 February 2004 Brecht won his first K-1 tournament in Stockholm, Sweden qualifying for K-1 World GP 2004 in Las Vegas II. In the quarter-finals he was matched up against heavy favorite, American Carter Williams, Wallis won the fight by spectacular high kick in round 3. His next opponent in the semis was again Jorgen Kruth. After an evenly fought match Brecht Wallis was announced the winner by unanimous decision and moved on to the tournament finals against American Mighty Mo where he suffered his first loss by a devastating KO in a second round.

After few years out of the K-1 fighting circuit Brecht Wallis made his comeback on 4 May 2007 at the K-1 Fighting Network GP 2007 in Romania, winning the tournament over Doug Viney, Errol Zimmerman and Paula Mataele and he qualified for K-1 World GP 2007 in Amsterdam.

He defeated Martinis Knyzelis via decision at K-1 World Grand Prix 2013 in Vilnius in Vilnius, Lithuania on 27 April 2013.

== Titles ==
- 2007 K-1 Fighting Network Romania Champion
- 2004 K-1 World Grand Prix in Las Vegas II Runner-up
- 2004 K-1 Scandinavia World Qualification Champion

== Kickboxing record ==
Kickboxing record
30 wins (13 KOs), 9 losses, 2 draws
Date	Result	Opponent	Event	Location	Method	Round	Time
2013-04-27	Win	(Lithuania) Martinis Knyzelis	K-1 World Grand Prix 2013 in Vilnius	Vilnius, Lithuania	Decision	3	3:00
2007-06-23	Loss	(Switzerland) Björn Bregy	K-1 World Grand Prix 2007 in Amsterdam, Quarter-finals	Amsterdam, Netherlands	Decision (unanimous)	3	3:00
2007-05-04	Win	(New Zealand) Paula Mataele	K-1 Fighting Network Romania 2007, Final	Bucharest, Romania	KO (straight punch)	2	1:00
Wins the K-1 Fighting Network Romania 2007 title.
2007-05-04	Win	(Curaçao) Errol Zimmerman	K-1 Fighting Network Romania 2007, Semi-finals	Bucharest, Romania	Decision (majority)	3	3:00
2007-05-04	Win	(New Zealand) Doug Viney	K-1 Fighting Network Romania 2007, Quarter-finals	Bucharest, Romania	KO (left roundhouse kick)	3	0:50
2007-04-07	Loss	(Curaçao) Errol Zimmerman	Balans Fight Night	Tilburg, Netherlands	Decision	3	3:00
2007-03-24	Win	(Belgium) Frédéric Sinistra	It's Showtime 23	Lommel, Belgium	Decision	3	3:00
2006-10-07	Win	(Netherlands) Peter Mulder	2 Hot 2 Handle	Emmen, Netherlands	(T)KO (Body Kick)	3	
2006-06-25	Win	(Morocco) Aziz Jahjah	Future Battle 2	Bergen op Zoom, Netherlands	Decision	3	3:00
2006-03-26	Loss	(Netherlands) Lloyd van Dams	Balans Fight Night	Tilburg, Netherlands	Decision (Unanimous)	3	3:00
2005-12-17	Draw	(Netherlands) Eric Zowa	2 Hot 2 Handle	Maastricht, Netherlands	Decision	3	3:00
2005-10-02	Loss	(Russia) Alexander Ustinov	The Battle of Arnhem IV	Arnhem, Netherlands	KO	1	
2005-09-16	Loss	(Romania) Daniel Ghiță	Local Kombat 16	Cluj-Napoca, Romania	Decision (Unanimous)	3	3:00
2005-05-02	Win	(Russia) Alexander Ustinov	Total Kombat 3	Pitești, Romania	Decision	5	3:00
2005-03-26	Loss	(Switzerland) Björn Bregy	Gala in Barneveld	Barneveld, Netherlands	TKO (Doctor Stoppage)	3	3:00
2004-11-12	Win	(Belgium) Aziz Khattou	Fights at the Border III	Lommel, Belgium	Decision (Unanimous)	3	3:00
2004-11-04	Draw	(Romania) Cătălin Zmărăndescu	Total Kombat 1	Brașov, Romania	Decision		
2004-08-07	Loss	(United States) Mighty Mo	K-1 World Grand Prix 2004 in Las Vegas II, Final	Las Vegas, Nevada, United States	KO (Right overhand)	2	2:55
For the K-1 World Grand Prix 2004 in Las Vegas title.
2004-08-07	Win	(Sweden) Jörgen Kruth	K-1 World Grand Prix 2004 in Las Vegas II, Semi-finals	Las Vegas, Nevada, United States	Decision (Unanimous)	3	3:00
2004-08-07	Win	(United States) Carter Williams	K-1 World Grand Prix 2004 in Las Vegas II, Quarter-finals	Las Vegas, Nevada, United States	KO (high kick)	3	0:55
2004-02-14	Win	(Sweden) Rickard Nordstrand	K-1 Scandinavia 2004 World Qualification, Final	Stockholm, Sweden	TKO (Corner stoppage)	3	3:00
Wins the K-1 Scandinavia 2004 World Qualification tournament.
2004-02-14	Win	(Finland) Petri Reima	K-1 Scandinavia 2004 World Qualification, Semi-finals	Stockholm, Sweden	Decision (Majority)	3	3:00
2004-02-14	Win	(Sweden) Johan Mparmpagiannis	K-1 Scandinavia 2004 World Qualification, Quarter-finals	Stockholm, Sweden	TKO (Fighter gave up)	2	2:35
2003-04-06	Win	(Sweden) Jörgen Kruth	K-1 Holland Grand Prix 2003, Quarter-finals	Zoetermeer, Netherlands	Ext.R Decision (Majority)	4	3:00
Legend: Win Loss Draw/No contest Notes
