= James Phillips (kickboxer) =

- Born: James Phillips; June 11, 1980 (age 46); Mannheim, West Germany
- Other names: Mr.Highkick
- Nationality: (Germany) German (United States) American
- Height: 1.90 m (6 ft 3 in)
- Weight: 86.0 kg (189.6 lb; 13.54 st)
- Division: Cruiserweight
- Style: Muay Thai, Kickboxing, Boxing
- Stance: Orthodox
- Team: Team Phillips - Fight & Fitness / Wachenburgstr.125 / 68219 Mannheim Flößerstraße 12 / Edingen-Neckarhausen
- Trainer: James Phillips
- Years active: 1997–present

Kickboxing record
- Total: 107
- Wins: 82
- By knockout: 34
- Losses: 25
- By knockout: 3
- Last updated on: November 19, 2011

James Phillips (also known as "Mr Highkick") is a German heavyweight kickboxer of African American descent, currently competing in K-1. He was born on June 11, 1980. He is a former European Muay Thai champion and two-time K-1 Croatia tournament champion. He was trained by Michael Damboer and fights out of Thai-Bombs Mannheim.

== Biography and career ==
James Phillips was born in 1980 in Mannheim, Germany, to a German mother and African American father. He started his martial arts training at the age of 13, studying karate and kickboxing for 4 years before moving on to Muay Thai in 1997 with the Thai-Bombs Mannheim e.V, becoming the European Muay Thai champion in 2002. He has also competed in amateur boxing.

He is married and the father of two girls.

=== Team Phillips ===
He is the owner and one of the coaches of "Team Phillips Fight & Fitness", along with Elias Handke, Mahir Tan, Sylvia Krüger, Markus R, Markus Knoop, Endre Piller, Isabel Knoop, and Francesco Palermo.

== Championship Titles ==
- Professional
  - 2014 IKBO World K-1 champion (86 kg)
  - 2011 Fight Night Mannheim Champion
  - 2010 IKBF European Kickboxing champion (91 Kg)
  - 2010 K-1 Collizion Croatia Vize Champion
  - 2009 K-1 ColliZion Croatia champion
  - 2009 K-1 Collizion World Grand Prix (Final Elimination)
  - 2007 K-1 Network World Grand Prix
  - 2007 K-1 Fighting Network Croatia champion
  - 2006 Fight Night Mannheim champion
  - 2005 K-1 Final Battle champion
  - 2005 The Fight Club Riccione tournament champion
  - 2004 WMC / S1 Heavyweight Tournament Champion
  - 2003 IKBF European Kickboxing champion (86 kg)
- Amateur
  - 2003 IMTF Teilnahme an der Amateur Muay Thai World championship in Bangkok
  - 2002 IMTF European Amateur Muaythai champion – (Europameister Muay Thai)
  - 2001 IMTF Teilnahme an der Amateur Muay Thai World championship in Bangkok
  - 2000 IMTF German Amateur Muay Thai Champion – (deutscher Meister Muay Thai)
  - 2000 IMTF Swiss Amateur Muay Thai Champion – (Schweizer Meister Muay Thai)
  - 2000 IMTF 3. Place European Amateur Muay Thai Champion
  - 2000 Baden-Württembergischer Amateur Muay Thai Champion
  - 1999 IMTF Teilnahme an der Amateur Muay Thai World championship in Bangkok
  - 1999 IMTF German Amateur Muay Thai Champion – (deutscher Meister Muay Thai)
  - 1999 Bayerischer Amateur Champion
  - 1998 IMTF German Amateur Muay Thai Vize Champion
  - 1998 Baden-Württembergischer Amateur Muay Thai Champion

== Kickboxing record ==
Kickboxing record
82 Wins (34(T) KO's, 48 decisions), 25 Losses
Date	Result	Opponent	Event	Location	Method	Round	Time
2016-05-07	Loss	(Romania) Bogdan Stoica	Showdown Fight Night	Mannheim, Germany	KO	2	—N/a
2015-09-12	Win	(Netherlands) Errol Konning	It's Fight Time 2	Darmstadt, Germany	Decision	3	3:00
2014-04-26	Win	(Bosnia and Herzegovina) Almedin Hasanagic	Rhein Neckar Fight Night	Ludwigshafen, Germany	KO	2	
Wins IKBO World K-1 title (86 kg).
2011-11-19	Loss	(Romania) Andrei Stoica	SuperKombat World Grand Prix Final 2011	Darmstadt, Germany	KO (Right High Kick)	1	2:19
2011-10-15	Win	(Russia) Michail Tutierev	Fight Night Mannheim	Mannheim, Germany	Decision	3	3:00
2011-10-15	Win	(Slovenia) Ladin Etic	Fight Night Mannheim	Mannheim, Germany	Decision	3	3:00
2010-03-27	Win	(Italy) Hicham Tourar	K1 Alpes	Bolzano, Italy	Decision	3	3:00
2010-09-25	Win	(Poland) Jaroslaw Zawodni	Fight Night Mannheim	Mannheim, Germany	TKO (Referee stoppage)	5	3:00
2010-06-24	Loss	(Czech Republic) Ondrej Hutnik	WFCA Prague	Prague, Czech Republic	Decision (Unanimous)	3	3:00
2010-03-27	Loss	(Croatia) Agron Preteni	K-1 ColliZion 2010 Croatia	Split, Croatia	Decision (Unanimous)	3	3:00
For K-1 ColliZion 2010 Croatia 4-men Heavyweight tournament title.
2010-03-27	Win	(Romania) Andrei Stoica	K-1 ColliZion 2010 Croatia	Split, Croatia	Decision	3	3:00
2009-10-24	Loss	(Russia) Shamil Abasov	K-1 ColliZion 2009 Final Elimination	Arad, Romania	Decision (Unanimous)	3	3:00
2009-08-29	Win	(Germany) Werner Kreiskott	The Night in Löwen	Wuppertal, Germany	KO (High Kick)	3	N/A
2009-07-03	Loss	(Romania) Coco Rus	K-1 ColliZion 2009 Sarajevo	Sarajevo, Bosnia and Herzegovina	Decision (Majority)	3	3:00
2009-06-06	Win	(Turkey) Tarik Kuzucu	Fightclub Nürnberg	Nuremberg, Germany	KO (High kick)	1	
2009-05-09	Win	(Turkey) Yahya Gülay	Mix Fight Gala VIII	Darmstadt, Germany	TKO (Corner stoppage/Gülay gave up)	1	3:00
2009-03-21	Win	(Austria) Patrick Berger	K-1 ColliZion 2009 Croatia	Split, Croatia	Decision (Unanimous)	3	3:00
Wins K-1 ColliZion 2009 Croatia 4-men Heavyweight tournament title.
2009-03-21	Win	(France) David Dancrade	K-1 ColliZion 2009 Croatia	Split, Croatia	TKO (Referee stoppage)	3	
2008-12-13	Win	(Turkey) Serdar Karaca	The Champions Club	Bamberg, Germany	KO (Left high kick)	2	2:37
2008-10-25	Win	(France) Jimmy Sidony	Mix Fight Gala VII	Darmstadt, Germany	TKO (Referee stoppage)	1	0:55
2007-11-03	Loss	(Romania) Daniel Ghiţă	Local Kombat 27 "Porţile de fier"	Drobeta-Turnu Severin, Romania	KO (Low kicks)	2	1:58
2007-09-01	Win	(Morocco) Yussuf Belmikdan	Fight Night Mannheim "The Battle Continues"	Mannheim, Germany	KO (Knees)	2	2:48
Wins Fight Night Mannheim "The Battle Continues" 4-men tournament title.
2007-09-01	Win	(Germany) Florian Ogunade	Fight Night Mannheim "The Battle Continues"	Mannheim, Germany	Ext. R Decision (Split)	4	3:00
2007-06-23	Loss	(Azerbaijan) Zabit Samedov	K-1 World Grand Prix 2007 in Amsterdam	Amsterdam, Netherlands	Decision (Unanimous)	3	3:00
2007-03-10	Win	(Croatia) Ante Varnica	K-1 Fighting Network Croatia 2007	Split, Croatia	KO (Right hooks)	2	1:01
Wins K-1 Fighting Network Croatia 2007 tournament title.
2007-03-10	Win	(Croatia) Damir Tovarovic	K-1 Fighting Network Croatia 2007	Split, Croatia	TKO (Knee to the body)	1	1:33
2007-03-10	Win	(Serbia) Dragan Jovanović	K-1 Fighting Network Croatia 2007	Split, Croatia	Decision (Unanimous)	3	3:00
2007-01-27	Win	(Slovakia) Roman Kupcak	Fight Night	Mannheim, Germany	KO (High kick)	2	N/A
2006-09-16	Win	(Morocco) Mohamed Oudriss	Fight Night Mannheim 2006	Mannheim, Germany	TKO (Corner stoppage)	2	
Wins Fight Night Mannheim 4-men tournament title.
2007-09-16	Win	(France) Abdel Lahmizi	Fight Night Mannheim 2006	Mannheim, Germany	TKO (Corner stoppage)	2	3:00
2006-07-08	Loss	(Turkey) Ergin Solmaz	WPKC & WMC Grand Prix Tournament, Quarter Finals	Riccione, Italy	Decision (Unanimous)	3	3:00
2006-06-03	Loss	(Albania) Azem Maksutaj	K-1 Gala in Luzern	Luzern, Switzerland	Decision (Unanimous)	3	3:00
2006-05-20	Loss	(Sweden) Thomas Rasmussen	K-1 Scandinavia Grand Prix 2006	Stockholm, Sweden	Decision (Unanimous)	3	3:00
2006-03-12	Win	(Germany) Christian Lüdeke	Fight Night Leverkusen	Leverkusen, Germany	TKO (Low kicks)	3	1:00
2006-02-17	Loss	(Albania) Azem Maksutaj	K-1 European League 2006 in Bratislava	Bratislava, Slovakia	Decision (Unanimous)	3	3:00
2005-12-10	Win	(Germany) Asmir Burgic	K-1 Final Battle 2005	Lübeck, Germany	TKO (Kick to the body)	2	
Wins K-1 Final Battle 2005 tournament title.
2005-12-10	Win	(Germany) Waldemar Dohmke	K-1 Final Battle 2005	Lübeck, Germany	Decision (Unanimous)	3	3:00
2005-10-29	Win	(Netherlands) Rodney Faverus	K-1 New Talents 2005 in Germany	Koblenz, Germany	Decision (Unanimous)	3	3:00
2005-06-25	Win	(Hungary) Attila Karacs	The Fight Club Riccione 4-men tournament	Riccione, Italy	Decision (Unanimous)	3	3:00
Wins The Fight Club Riccione 4-men tournament title.
2005-06-25	Win	(Czech Republic) Petr Vondracek	The Fight Club Riccione 4-men tournament	Riccione, Italy	TKO (Doctor stoppage)	2	2:16
2005-05-07	Loss	(Albania) Xhavit Bajrami	Kickboxgala in Bern	Bern, Switzerland	Decision (Split)	3	3:00
2004-12-17	Win	(Germany) Christian Lüdeke	Muay Thai Gala in Bonn	Bonn, Germany	TKO (Doctor stop/leg injury)	1	3:00
2004-10-30	Win	(Angola) Henriques Zowa	MTBD Jubiläumsgala	Kaiserslautern, Germany	Decision (Unanimous)	3	3:00
2003-04-13	Win	(Netherlands) Enrico Grootenhuis	Kickboxgala in Dresden	Dresden, Germany	KO (Right cross)	1	N/A
Wins IKBF European Kickboxing title (86 kg).
2002-10-28	Win	(Russia) Unknown Fighter	IMTF European championships	Portugal	Decision	4	2:00
Wins IMTF European Amateur muay thai title (86 kg).
2001-10-27	Win	(Switzerland) Mdiba	Kickbox Gala in Ratheim	Ratheim, Germany	Decision	5	3:00
Legend: Win Loss Draw/No contest Notes

== See also ==
- List of K-1 Events
- List of K-1 champions
- List of male kickboxers
