= Björn Bregy =

Swiss heavyweight kickboxer

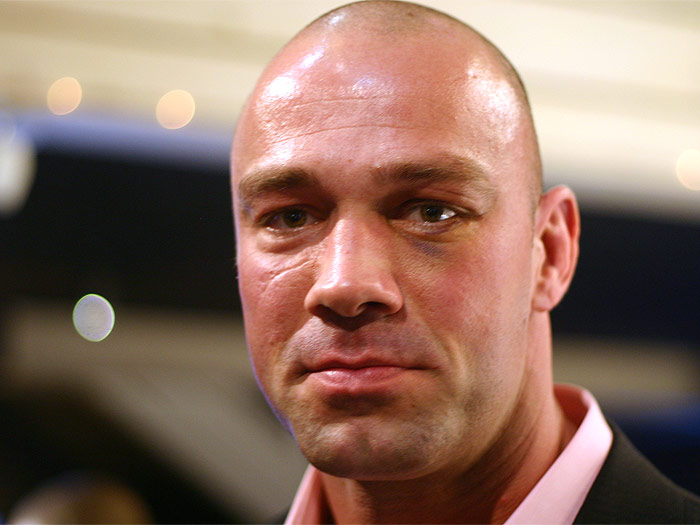
- Born: Björn Heinrich Walter Bregy; September 30, 1974 (age 52); Sion, Switzerland
- Other names: The Rock
- Nationality: Swiss
- Height: 2.02 m (6 ft 8 in)
- Weight: 125 kg (276 lb; 19.7 st)
- Division: Heavyweight
- Style: Yoseikan Budo, kickboxing
- Fighting out of: Amsterdam, Netherlands
- Team: Mike's Gym; Vos Gym; Masters Gym
- Trainer: Mike Passenier; Klaus Waschkewitz
- Years active: 11 (1999–2010)

Kickboxing record
- Total: 53
- Wins: 34
- By knockout: 29
- Losses: 18
- By knockout: 11
- No contests: 1
- Last updated on: August 30, 2009

Björn Heinrich Walter Bregy (born September 30, 1974) is a Swiss heavyweight kickboxer, European Yoseikan Budo champion and K-1 Europe 2006 in Amsterdam tournament Champion. He holds notable wins over Gokhan Saki, Ray Sefo, Alexander Ustinov, Freddy Kemayo (twice), and Alexey Ignashov.

== Career ==
Bregy made his K-1 debut on June 3, 2000 at K-1 Fight Night 2000 in Zürich, Switzerland, against Reinhard Ulz. He won the fight by 2 round KO.

On May 21, 2005, in Stockholm, Sweden, Bregy beat all three opponents Pavel Majer, Denis Grigoriev and Gary Turner and won his first K-1 tournament title. In 2006 Bregy continued his strong performance in K-1 World GP in Amsterdam, winning the tournament by three consecutive KOs over Freddy Kemayo, Naoufal Benazzouz and Gokhan Saki, and qualifying for the K-1 World GP final elimination 2006 in Osaka, Japan. He was matched up against the defending K-1 World champion Semmy Schilt, and lost the fight by first round left hook KO.

On February 9, 2008 at K-1 Europe Elimination GP in Budapest, Hungary, Bregy knocked out Paula Mataele and qualified for the K-1 European GP held in Amsterdam, Netherlands.

On April 26, 2008 Bregy participated on his third consecutive K-1 European GP. He knocked out South African Jan Nortje in the quarterfinals and was stopped by Errol Zimmerman in the semis at the end of the third round by a flurry of punches.

== Titles ==
- 2007 K-1 World Grand Prix in Amsterdam runner-up
- 2006 K-1 World Grand Prix in Amsterdam Champion
- 2005 K-1 Scandinavia Grand Prix Champion
- 2003 K-1 World Grand Prix in Basel runner-up
- WKA European Heavyweight Champion
- World Champion Yoseikan - budo

== Kickboxing record (incomplete) ==
35 wins (29 (T)KOs, 5 decisions), 18 losses, 1 no contest
Date	Result	Opponent	Event	Method	Round	Time
17/04/2010	Win	(Curaçao) Wendell Roche	It's Showtime 2010 Budapest, Budapest, Hungary	Decision	3	3:00
29/08/2009	Loss	(Hungary) Attila Karacs	It's Showtime 2009 Budapest, Budapest, Hungary	Decision (unanimous)	3	3:00
16/05/2009	Loss	(Suriname) Ashwin Balrak	It's Showtime 2009 Amsterdam, Amsterdam, Netherlands	Ext. R decision (unanimous)	4	3:00
10/05/2008	Loss	(Belarus) Alexey Ignashov	K.O. Events "Tough is not Enough", Rotterdam, Netherlands	Decision (unanimous)	3	3:00
06/06/2008	Loss	(Romania) Daniel Ghiţă	Local Kombat 30, Timișoara, Romania	Decision (unanimous)	3	3:00
05/24/2008	Win	(Netherlands) Andre Janssens	Gentleman Promotions Fightnight, Tilburg, Netherlands	TKO (low kicks)	2	N/A
04/26/2008	Loss	(Netherlands) Errol Zimmerman	K-1 World GP 2008 in Amsterdam, Netherlands	KO (punches)	3	2:59
04/26/2008	Win	(South Africa) Jan Nortje	K-1 World GP 2008 in Amsterdam, Netherlands	KO (punches)	1	1:10
02/09/2008	Win	(Tonga) Paula Mataele	K-1 World GP 2008 in Budapest, Hungary	KO (punches)	2	1:12
08/11/2007	Win	(New Zealand) Ray Sefo	K-1 World GP 2007 in Las Vegas, USA	Decision (split)	3	3:00
06/23/2007	Loss	(Australia) Paul Slowinski	K-1 World Grand Prix 2007 in Amsterdam, Netherlands	KO (right hook)	2	2:25
06/23/2007	Win	(Russia) Magomed Magomedov	K-1 World Grand Prix 2007 in Amsterdam, Netherlands	KO (punches)	2	2:12
06/23/2007	Win	(Belgium) Brecht Wallis	K-1 World Grand Prix 2007 in Amsterdam, Netherlands	Decision (unanimous)	3	3:00
04/07/2007	Loss	(Morocco) Aziz Jahjah	Balans Fight Night, Netherlands	TKO (doctor stoppage)	N/A	N/A
09/30/2006	Loss	(Netherlands) Semmy Schilt	K-1 World Grand Prix 2006 in Osaka opening round, Japan	KO (left punch)	1	2:11
07/30/2006	Win	(Japan) Tsuyoshi Nakasako	K-1 World Grand Prix 2006 in Sapporo, Japan	KO (right hook)	1	2:35
06/03/2006	Loss	(Albania) Mitat Tahirsylai	Night of Revenge, Luzern, Switzerland	KO (right hook)	1	N/A
05/13/2006	Win	(Turkey) Gokhan Saki	K-1 World Grand Prix 2006 in Amsterdam, Netherlands	KO (left hook)	1	1:44
05/13/2006	Win	(France) Naoufal Benazzouz	K-1 World Grand Prix 2006 in Amsterdam, Netherlands	KO	2	1:40
05/13/2006	Win	(France) Freddy Kemayo	K-1 World Grand Prix 2006 in Amsterdam, Netherlands	KO	3	1:10
02/17/2006	NC	(Russia) Alexander Ustinov	K-1 European League 2006 in Bratislava, Slovakia	NC	N/A	N/A
12/18/2005	Win	(Bulgaria) Alben Belinski	Local Kombat 18 "Revanşa"	Decision	3	3:00
12/10/2005	Loss	(Suriname) Ashwin Balrak	Fights at the Border IV, Belgium	Decision	3	3:00
09/24/2005	Win	(Russia) Evgeny Orlov	Fight Night in Winterthur, Switzerland	KO	1	N/A
05/21/2005	Win	(United Kingdom) Gary Turner	K-1 Scandinavia Grand Prix 2005, Sweden	Decision (unanimous)	3	3:00
05/21/2005	Win	(Ukraine) Denis Grigoriev	K-1 Scandinavia Grand Prix 2005, Sweden	TKO	N/A	N/A
05/21/2005	Win	(Czech Republic) Pavel Majer	K-1 Scandinavia Grand Prix 2005, Sweden	TKO	N/A	N/A
04/16/2005	Loss	(Russia) Alexander Ustinov	K-1 Italy 2005 Oktagon, Milano, Italy	TKO (doctor stoppage)	1	3:00
03/26/2005	Win	(Belgium) Brecht Wallis	Gala in Barneveld, Netherlands	TKO (doctor stoppage)	N/A	N/A
02/13/2005	Win	(Belarus) Alexey Ignashov	Mix Fight Gala, Alkmaar, Netherlands	TKO (knee injury)	3	3:00
12/11/2004	Win	(France) Freddy Kemayo	Fights at the Border III, Lommel, Belgium	KO	N/A	N/A
11/07/2004	Win	(Turkey) Gurhan Degirmenci	Deventer, Netherlands	TKO	N/A	N/A
09/25/2004	Loss	(Switzerland) Azem Maksutaj	Fists of Fury 4, Zurich, Switzerland	KO (right hook)	2	N/A
05/22/2004	Win	(Albania) Mitat Tahirsylai	SuperLeague Switzerland 2004, Winterthur, Switzerland	TKO (corner stoppage)	2	N/A
04/08/2004	Win	(Croatia) Mladen Brestovac	Heaven or Hell, Prague, Czech Republic	TKO (eye injury)	N/A	N/A
12/06/2003	Loss	(United States) Carter Williams	K-1 World Grand Prix 2003, Japan	KO (punches)	2	2:50
10/11/2003	Win	(Canada) Michael McDonald	K-1 World Grand Prix 2003 final elimination, Japan	TKO (three knockdowns)	1	2:50
05/30/2003	Loss	(Netherlands) Jerrel Venetiaan	K-1 World Grand Prix 2003 in Basel, Switzerland	Decision	3	3:00
05/30/2003	Win	(United Kingdom) Gary Turner	K-1 World Grand Prix 2003 in Basel, Switzerland	Decision	3	3:00
05/30/2003	Win	(South Africa) Donovan Luff	K-1 World Grand Prix 2003 in Basel, Switzerland	TKO	1	N/A
03/30/2003	Loss	(Netherlands) Remy Bonjasky	K-1 World Grand Prix 2003 in Saitama, Japan	TKO (corner stoppage)	3	1:29
01/11/2003	Win	(Spain) Satari	A Night to Remember, Hilversum, Netherlands	TKO (low kicks)	2	N/A
05/25/2002	Loss	(Belarus) Alexey Ignashov	K-1 World Grand Prix 2002 in Paris, France	KO (kick)	5	2:12
07/20/2001	Loss	(Netherlands) Lloyd van Dams	K-1 World Grand Prix 2001 in Nagoya, Japan	Decision	3	3:00
09/01/2000	Loss	(Croatia) Drazo Orduri	K-1 Grand Prix Europe 2000, Zagreb, Croatia	KO (punch)	1	N/A
06/03/2000	Win	(Austria) Reinhard Ulz	K-1 Fight Night 2000, Zurich, Switzerland	KO	2	N/A

== See also ==
- List of K-1 events
- List of K-1 champions
- List of male kickboxers
