= Péter Varga =

Hungarian kickboxer (born 1974)

- Born: Péter Varga; January 24, 1974 (age 52)
- Other names: Hungarian Locomotive
- Nationality: (Hungary) Hungarian
- Height: 1.86 m (6 ft 1 in)
- Weight: 230 lb (104 kg; 16 st)
- Division: Heavyweight
- Style: Judo, Kempo, Kung-fu
- Stance: Orthodox
- Team: Juhasz-Gym

Kickboxing record
- Total: 54
- Wins: 35
- By knockout: 24
- Losses: 17
- Draws: 2

Péter Varga (born 24 January 1974) is a former Hungarian heavyweight kickboxer.

== Titles and accomplishments ==
- 2003 King Of The Ring Europe Grand Prix champion
- 2002 K-1 World Grand Prix Preliminary Italy runner up
- 2002 WPKC Muay Thai Super Heavyweight World Champion +95 kg
- W.P.K.L. Kickboxing European champion
- A.K.B.O. Kickboxing European champion
- 1999 IKBO European Kickboxing champion
- 1999 Kung Fu World champion

== Kickboxing record ==
Kickboxing Record
35 Wins (24 (T)KO's, 6 Decisions), 17 Losses, 2 Draws
Date	Result	Opponent	Event	Location	Method	Round	Time
2007-02-24	Loss	(France) Freddy Kemayo	K-1 European League 2007 Hungary	Budapest, Hungary	KO	3	2:16
2007-01-26	Win	(Bosnia and Herzegovina) Adis Šabotić		Rijeka, Croatia	KO (Liver shot)	2	
2006-08-18	Loss	(Azerbaijan) Zabit Samedov	K-1 Hungary 2006 Quarter Finals	Debrecen, Hungary	Decision (Unanimous)	3	3:00
2006-07-08	Loss	(Morocco) Yussuf Belmikdan	WPKC & WMC Grand Prix Tournament, Quarter Finals	Riccione, Italy	TKO (Doctor Stop.)		
2006-02-17	Loss	(Lithuania) Mindaugas Sakalauskas	K-1 European League 2006 in Budapest	Budapest, Hungary	Decision	3	3:00
2005-11-12	Loss	(Romania) Ciprian Sora	Local Combat 17	Braşov, Romania	Decision	3	3:00
2005-08-19	Loss	(Czech Republic) Pavel Majer	K-1 Hungary Grand Prix 2005	Debrecen, Hungary	Ext.R Decision	4	3:00
2005-05-21	Loss	(Sweden) Wisam Feyli	K-1 Scandinavia Grand Prix 2005 Quarter Finals	Stockholm, Sweden	Decision (Split)	3	3:00
2005-04-03	Win	(Turkey) Hasan Gül	Fight Gala, Sportcentrum Schuttersveld	Rotterdam, Netherlands	TKO (Doctor stoppage)		
2004-11-05		(Netherlands) Marco van Spaendonck	Total Kombat 1 "Cade Braşovul"	Braşov, Romania			
2004-08-19	Loss	(France) Grégory Tony	K-1 Grand Prix Hungary	Debrecen, Hungary	Decision	3	3:00
2004	Loss	(Croatia) Josip Bodrožić		Ugento, Italy	Decision (Unanimous)	5	3:00
Lost WPKC Muay Thai Super Heavyweight World title.
2003-11-29	Win	(Netherlands) Jerrel Venetiaan	King Of The Ring 2003 Europe Grand Prix, Final	Padua, Italy	2nd Ext.R Decision (Split)	5	3:00
Wins King Of The Ring 2003 Europe Grand Prix.
2003-11-29	Win	(Czech Republic) Jan Muller	King Of The Ring 2003 Europe Grand Prix, Semi Finals	Padua, Italy	TKO (Referee Stoppage/2 Knockdowns)	1	
Varga had a walktrough in quarter finals over Jorgen Himmerstahl.
2003-05-10	Loss	(Russia) Evgeny Orlov	K-1 World Grand Prix 2003 Preliminary Milan Semi Finals	Milan, Italy	KO	1	1:15
2003-05-10	Win	(Czech Republic) Dan Jarling	K-1 World Grand Prix 2003 Preliminary Milan Quarter Finals	Milan, Italy	Ext.R Decision	4	3:00
2002-11-30	Win	(Switzerland) Azem Maksutaj	Kickboxing Mondiale 3	Padua, Italy	KO	4	
Wins Maksutaj's WPKC Muay Thai Super Heavyweight World title.
2002	Loss	(Croatia) Ante Varnica			KO	1	
2002-04-20	Loss	(Czech Republic) Petr Vondracek	K-1 World Grand Prix 2002 Preliminary Italy Final	Milan, Italy	KO	2	2:45
Fails to qualify for K-1 World Grand Prix 2002 in Las Vegas.
2002-04-20	Win	(Italy) Danilo Capuzi	K-1 World Grand Prix 2002 Preliminary Italy Semi Finals	Milan, Italy	KO	2	1:51
2002-04-20	Win	(Italy) Mario Katzis	K-1 World Grand Prix 2002 Preliminary Italy Quarter Finals	Milan, Italy	KO	3	0:41
2001-11-18	Loss	(England) Matt Skelton	Jungle Wars V	Northampton, England, UK	TKO (Doctor Stoppage, Knee Injury)	3	0:53
Fight was for Skelton's I.K.F. Pro Muay Thai Super Heavyweight World title.
2001-09-23	Win	(Greece) Dimitri Alexudis	Battle Of Arnhem III	Arnhem, Netherlands	KO	8	
2001-03-17	Loss	(Denmark) Nicholas Pettas	K-1 Gladiators 2001	Yokohama, Japan	KO (Right Low Kick)	3	1:39
2001-02-04	Loss	(Sweden) Jörgen Kruth	K-1 Holland GP 2001 in Arnhem Quarter Finals	Arnhem, Netherlands	KO	2	
2000-12-12	Loss	(Netherlands) Remy Bonjasky	It's Showtime - Christmas Edition	Haarlem, Netherlands	KO (Jumping Knee Strike)	1	2:57
2000-05-12	Loss	(Greece) Paris Vasilikos	K-1 King of the Ring 2000 Quarter Finals	Milan, Italy	Decision (Unanimous)	3	3:00
Legend: Win Loss Draw/No contest Notes

== See also ==
- List of K-1 events
- List of K-1 champions
- List of male kickboxers
