= Josip Bodrožić =

Australian-Croatian kickboxer

- Born: Josip Bodrožić; 20 June 1973 (age 53); Melbourne, Australia
- Nationality: (Australia) Australian (Croatia) Croatian
- Height: 1.98 m (6 ft 6 in)
- Weight: 120 kg (265 lb; 18 st 13 lb)
- Division: Super Heavyweight
- Style: Muay Thai
- Fighting out of: Kaštel Gomilica

Josip Bodrožić, a retired Australian–Croatian super heavyweight kickboxer, was born on 20 June 1973, in Melbourne, Australia. He is 2 meters tall, and during his competitive career weighed approximately 120 kilograms.

== Biography and career ==
At the age of 13 Bodrožić moved with his family to Kaštel Gomilica. He became active in amateur kickboxing, and competed in the European and World Championships until 2000, when he turned professional. Two of his most noted accomplishments were bronze medals at W.A.K.O., world championships under full contact rules 1997 in Gdańsk and again in 1999 in Caorle.

In 2000, as a professional, Bodrožić began competing overseas, often in K-1 promotions. His most famous fight was against Belarusian Alexey Ignashov in 2003 at the K-1 Final Fight Stars War in Zagreb, the capital of Croatia—an event promoted by Orsat Zovko. Bodrožić lost the five-round fight by a split decision.

In Ugento, Italy in 2004, Bodrožić became the W.P.K.C. super heavyweight muay thai world champion, beating Hungarian Peter Varga in five rounds, dropping him down several times. In April 2004, he participated in K-1 Italy's Grand Prix 2004 in Milan losing to Jörgen Kruth in the semi-finals.

In June 2004, Bodrožić became the K-1 Grand Prix BIH 2004 tournament champion. He won over Dževad Poturak in the quarter-finals, had a walkthrough in the semi-finals and finally won the tournament in a bout against Serbian Duško Basrak.

== Titles ==
Professional

- 2004 K-1 Grand Prix BIH tournament champion
- 2004 WPKC Muay Thai Super Heavyweight World Champion +95 kg

Amateur

- 1999 W.A.K.O. World Championships in Caorle, Italia (bronze) +91 kg (full contact rules)
- 1997 W.A.K.O. World Championships in Gdańsk, Poland (bronze) +91 kg (full contact rules)

== Professional kickboxing record ==
Kickboxing record
Date	Result	Opponent	Event	Location	Method	Round	Time
2005-11-11	Loss	(Romania) Cătălin Zmărăndescu	Local Kombat 17	Brașov, Romania	Decision	3	3:00
2005-09-16	Win	(Romania) Aurel Bococi	Local Kombat 16 "Liga Campionilor"	Cluj Napoca, Romania	TKO	4	
2004-12-10	Loss	(Romania) Ionuţ Iftimoaie	Local Kombat 11	Romania	Decision	3	3:00
2004-10-22	Win	(Canada) Alex Jucan	Local Kombat 10	Brăila, Romania	KO	2	
2004-07-16	Loss	(Belarus) Alexey Ignashov	Kings of Oceania 2004	Auckland, New Zealand	KO	1	
2004-06-11	Win	(Serbia) Duško Basrak	K-1 Grand Prix BIH 2004, Final	Široki Brijeg, BIH	KO	2	
Had a walktrough in the semi-finals due to Ivan Sočo's injury. Wins K-1 Grand Prix BIH 2004 title.
2004-06-11	Win	(Bosnia and Herzegovina) Dževad Poturak	K-1 Grand Prix BIH 2004, quarter-finals	Široki Brijeg, BIH	KO	2	
2004-04-24	Loss	(Sweden) Jörgen Kruth	K-1 Italy Grand Prix 2004 in Milan, semi-finals	Milan, Italy	KO (right overhand)	3	2:59
2004-04-24	Win	(Belgium) Marc de Wit	K-1 Italy Grand Prix 2004 in Milan, quarter-finals	Milan, Italy	Decision (unanimous)	3	3:00
2004	Win	(Hungary) Peter Varga		Ugento, Italy	Decision (unanimous)	5	3:00
Wins Varga's WPKC Muay Thai Super Heavyweight World title.
2004-02-28	Win	(France) Cheik Ouedrago	Kombat Festival	Genoa, Italy	KO		
2003-10-31	Loss	(Belarus) Alexey Ignashov	K-1 Final Fight Stars War in Zagreb	Zagreb, Croatia	Decision (split)	5	3:00
2003-09-12	Win	(New Zealand) Hiriwa Te Rangi	K-1 Final Fight	Spalato, Croatia	RTD	3	
2003-07-27	Loss	(Australia) Peter Graham	K-1 World Grand Prix 2003 in Melbourne	Melbourne, Australia	Decision	3	3:00
2003-04-11	Win	(New Zealand) Andrew Peck	K-1 Lord of the Rings	Auckland, New Zealand	KO (punch)	1	

== See also ==
- List of WAKO Amateur World Championships
- List of WAKO Amateur European Championships
- List of K-1 champions
- List of K-1 events
- List of male kickboxers
