= Grégory Tony =

French boxer

- Born: 27 May 1978 (age 48); Saint-Raphaël, France
- Other names: Gentleman
- Height: 1.95 m (6 ft 5 in)
- Weight: 104 kg (229 lb; 16.4 st)
- Division: Heavyweight
- Style: Kickboxing, Muay Thai, Boxing
- Stance: Orthodox
- Fighting out of: Paris, France
- Team: Kimé Dojo

Professional boxing record
- Total: 29
- Wins: 22
- By knockout: 16
- Losses: 7
- By knockout: 5

Kickboxing record
- Total: 99
- Wins: 83
- By knockout: 58
- Losses: 16

Mixed martial arts record
- Total: 1
- Wins: 1
- By submission: 1

Other information
- Website: http://www.gregtony.fr
- Boxing record from BoxRec
- Mixed martial arts record from Sherdog
- Last updated on: 17 March 2019

Grégory Tony (born 27 May 1978) is a French former professional kickboxer, professional boxer and mixed martial artist who competed from 2001 to 2018. In kickboxing, he is a three-time French champion and two-time European champion. In Muay Thai, he is a three-time French champion, one-time Intercontinental champion and two-time world champion. In boxing, he held the French heavyweight title in 2009.

== Professional kickboxing career ==
On 7 April 2012 he faced Igor Mihaljevic for vacant W.A.K.O. Pro heavyweight title, he won the title by knockout in fourth round with numerous low kicks.

He faced Igor Jurkovic at Glory 2: Brussels on 6 October 2012 in Brussels, Belgium and lost via TKO due to body shots in the second round.

As the W.K.N. World K-1 Rules Super-Heavyweight title bout in Draguignan, France on 14 June 2014 against Alex Rossi was canceled due to heavy rain floods, Gregory fought for the W.K.N. World Title but against Dmytro Bezus on 18 October 2014. Beating Bezus on points he became first W.K.N. super-heavyweight K-1 rules champion of the world. On 13 December 2014 in Dombasle, France he defended his W.K.N. title by KO win in Round 2 against Serbian Milan Dasic. On 26 March 2016 in Guadeloupe, Caribbean, he will be fighting Jiri Stariat from Czech Republic in his second W.K.N. title defense.

Tony fought Bob Sapp in the main event at Fight Night Saint Tropez on 4 August 2017 and won by TKO in the first round.

== Kickboxing & Muay Thai record ==
Kickboxing & Muay Thai record
83 Wins (58 (T)KOs), 16 Losses, 1 Draw
Date	Result	Opponent	Event	Location	Method	Round	Time
2018-08-04	Win	(Belgium) Frédéric Sinistra	Fight Night Saint Tropez 6	Saint Tropez, France	TKO	2	
2018-06-23	Win	(Hungary) Bresko Bence	Gala Du Phenix Muaythai	France	KO	2	
2017-08-04	Win	(United States) Bob Sapp	Fight Night Saint-Tropez	France	TKO (Punches)	1	
2016-11-11	Win	(Russia) Alexandr Soldatkin	Tatneft Cup 2016 final	Kazan, Russia	Decision (Unanimous)	4	3:00
2016-06-09	Win	(Czech Republic) Alen Kapetanovic	Gwada Super Fight	Guadeloupe, Caribbean Islands	KO (High kick)	2	
Defended WKN World K-1 Rules Super Heavyweight Title (+96.600 kg).
2016-04-26	Loss	(Netherlands) Hesdy Gerges	It's Hardcore Time Again 2	Meppen, Germany	TKO	1	3:00
For The Kings Of The Ring World K-1 Rules Super Heavyweight Title (+96.600 kg).
2015-07-25	Win	(France) Yannick Vest	Choc des Gladiateurs	Le Lavandou, France	KO	3	
Retains WKN World K-1 Rules Super Heavyweight Title (+96.600 kg).
2015-07-04	Win	(Cyprus) Panagiotis Diakos	Dragui Super Fight Night	Draguignan, France	KO (Flying knee)	2	
2014-12-13	Win	(Serbia) Milan Dašić	La Nuit des Sports de Combats	Dombasle-sur-Meurthe, France	KO	2	
Retains WKN World K-1 Rules Super Heavyweight Title (+96.600 kg).
2014-10-18	Win	(Ukraine) Dmytro Bezus	Choc Fight Night	Draguignan, France	Decision (Unanimous)	5	3:00
Wins Vacant WKN World K-1 Rules Super Heavyweight Title (+96.600 kg).
2012-10-06	Loss	(Croatia) Igor Jurković	Glory 2: Brussels	Brussels, Belgium	TKO (Ref Stop/3 Knockdowns)	2	
2012-04-07	Win	(Croatia) Igor Mihaljevic	K1 Rules World Championship	Sainte-Maxime, France	TKO (Lowkicks)	4	
Wins WAKO Pro World Low-Kick Rules Super-Heavyweight Title +94.2 kg.
2011-05-14	Loss	(Morocco) Badr Hari	It's Showtime 2011 Lyon	Lyon, France	TKO (Ref Stop/3 Knockdowns)	1	2:43
2009-12-18	Draw	(France) Fabrice Aurieng	Trophée Bad Panther	Stade Michel Volnay, Réunion	Decision Draw	5	3:00
Retains WKBC Heavyweight world title.
2008-09-27	Win	(South Africa) Francois Botha	WFC 6	Sofia, Bulgaria	Decision	3	3:00
2008-02-09	Win	(Croatia) Stipan Radic	KO World Series 2008 Auckland, Final	Auckland, New Zealand	KO (punches)	1	
Wins KO World Series 2008 Auckland title.
2008-02-09	Win	(Belarus) Alexey Ignashov	KO World Series 2008 Auckland, Semi Final	Auckland, New Zealand	Decision (Unanimous)	3	3:00
2007-01-26	Loss	(Azerbaijan) Zabit Samedov	K-1 Rules Kick Tournament 2007 in Marseilles, Final	Marseilles, France	KO	3	2:30
Fight was for K-1 Rules Kick Tournament 2007 in Marseilles title.
2007-01-26	Win	(Netherlands) Mark Bos	K-1 Rules Kick Tournament 2007 in Marseilles, Semi Final	Marseilles, France	TKO (knees)	2	
2007-01-26	Win	(Italy) Daniele Petroni	K-1 Rules Kick Tournament 2007 in Marseilles, Quarter Final	Marseilles, France	KO (high kick)	1	
2006-12-16	Loss	(Romania) Daniel Ghiţă	Local Kombat 24 "Bataie în Giulesti"	Bucharest, Romania	KO (Right hook)	2	2:09
2006-06-17	Loss	(Netherlands) Rodney Faverus	K-1 Canarias 2006, Final	Santa Cruz de Tenerife, Spain	TKO (knees and punches)	1	
Fight was for K-1 Canarias 2006 title.
2006-06-17	Win	(Russia) Venevicius Vaidotas	K-1 Canarias 2006, Semi Final	Santa Cruz de Tenerife, Spain	Decision	3	3:00
2006-06-17	Win	(Curaçao) Errol Zimmerman	K-1 Canarias 2006, Quarter Final	Santa Cruz de Tenerife, Spain	Decision (Unanimous)	3	3:00
2006-03-10	Win	(Romania) Daniel Ghiţă	Local Kombat 19 "Înfruntarea titanilor"	Iaşi, Romania	KO (Right high kick)	1	
2005-11-26	Win	(France) Patrice Quarteron	La Nuit des Champions	Marseilles, France	Decision (Unanimous)	5	2:00
Wins WKBC Heavyweight world title.
2005-10-29	Loss	(England) Gary Turner	K-1 New Talents 2005 in Germany	Koblenz, Germany	TKO (Corner Stoppage)	3	3:00
2005-05-27	Win	(Croatia) Petar Majstorovic	K-1 World Grand Prix 2005 in Paris	Paris, France	Decision (Unanimous)	3	3:00
2005-05-06	Win	(Russia) Evgeny Orlov	K-1 Slovakia 2005	Bratislava, Slovakia	Decision	3	3:00
2005-04-16	Loss	(Russia) Alexander Ustinov	K-1 Italy 2005 Oktagon, Semi Final	Milan, Italy	Decision (Unanimous)	3	3:00
2005-04-16	Win	(Belarus) Sergei Gur	K-1 Italy 2005 Oktagon, Quarter Final	Milan, Italy	Decision	3	3:00
2005-03-12	Win	(Belarus) Vitali Akhramenko		France	Decision (Unanimous)	3	3:00
2005-01-29	Loss	(France) Christian Nka	K-1 France Grand Prix 2005 in Marseilles, Final	Marseilles, France	Decision	3	3:00
Fight was for K-1 France Grand Prix 2005 in Marseilles title.
2005-01-29	Win	(Kyrgyzstan) Ruslan Avasov	K-1 France Grand Prix 2005 in Marseilles, Semi Final	Marseilles, France	Decision	3	3:00
2005-01-29	Win	(France) Matthias Riccio	K-1 France Grand Prix 2005 in Marseilles, Quarter Final	Marseilles, France	TKO	2	
2004-08-19	Win	(Hungary) Peter Varga	K-1 Grand Prix Hungary	Debrecen, Hungary	Decision	3	3:00
2004-04-24	Win	(England) Pelé Reid	Pain and Glory	Birmingham, England	Decision	3	3:00
2004-01-24	Loss	(Portugal) Humberto Evora	K-1 Marseilles 2004 World Qualification, Semi Final	Marseilles, France	Decision (Split)	3	3:00
2004-01-24	Win	(Hungary) Zsolt Lekner	K-1 Marseilles 2004 World Qualification, Quarter Final	Marseilles, France	TKO	3	1:00
2003-06-14	Loss	(Russia) Alexander Ustinov	K-1 World Grand Prix 2003 in Paris, Quarter Final	Paris, France	KO (Low kicks)	2	2:40
2003-01-24	Win	(Albania) Azem Maksutaj	K-1 World Grand Prix 2003 Preliminary France, Final	Marseilles, France	Decision (Unanimous)	3	3:00
Wins K-1 World Grand Prix 2003 Preliminary France Tournament title.
2003-01-24	Win	(France) Fabrice Bernardin	K-1 World Grand Prix 2003 Preliminary France, Semi Final	Marseilles, France	KO	2	0:59
2003-01-24	Win	(Czech Republic) Daniel Waciakowski	K-1 World Grand Prix 2003 Preliminary France, Quarter Final	Marseilles, France	Decision (Unanimous)	3	3:00
2002-08-17	Loss	(Canada) Michael McDonald	K-1 World Grand Prix 2002 in Las Vegas, Semi Final	Las Vegas, Nevada, USA	Decision (Unanimous)	3	3:00
2002-08-17	Win	(Czech Republic) Petr Vondracek	K-1 World Grand Prix 2002 in Las Vegas, Quarter Final	Las Vegas, Nevada, USA	KO	1	2:48
2002-05-25	Win	(Albania) Azem Maksutaj	K-1 World Grand Prix 2002 in Paris	Paris, France	Majority Decision (2-0)	5	3:00
2002-01-25	Win	(Albania) Azem Maksutaj	K-1 World Grand Prix 2002 in Marseilles, Final	Marseilles, France	Majority Decision (2-0)	3	3:00
Wins K-1 World Grand Prix 2002 in Marseilles Tournament title.
2002-01-25	Win	(France) Philippe Gomis	K-1 World Grand Prix 2002 in Marseilles, Semi Final	Marseilles, France	KO	1	2:57
2002-01-25	Win	(Algeria) Karim Aouaden	K-1 World Grand Prix 2002 in Marseilles, Quarter Final	Marseilles, France	KO	1	0:50
2001-06-09	Win	(Sweden) Jörgen Kruth	K-1 World Grand Prix 2001 Preliminary Scandinavia	Copenhagen, Denmark	Disqualification	3	2:38

== Professional boxing record ==
29 fights	22 wins	7 losses
By knockout	16	5
By decision	6	2

No.	Result	Record	Opponent	Type	Round, time	Date	Location	Notes
29	Win	22–7	Jakov Gospic	PTS	6	10 Dec 2016	Salle Roger Boileau, Meurthe-et-Moselle, France	
28	Loss	21–7	Izuagbe Ugonoh	TKO	2 (10), 2:26	1 Oct 2016	Vodafone Events Centre, Auckland, New Zealand	For vacant IBF Mediterranean heavyweight title
27	Win	21–6	David Gegeshidze	TKO	2 (6)	19 Dec 2015	Salle Des Sports De Dombasle, Meurthe-et-Moselle, France	
26	Loss	20–6	Mickael Vieira	MD	8	29 Mar 2014	Gymnase Halle Des Sports, Montluçon, France	
25	Loss	20–5	Newfel Ouatah	KO	4 (10)	30 Jan 2014	Gymnase Louison Bobet, Rillieux-la-Pape, France	For vacant French heavyweight title
24	Win	20–4	Jean Francois Traore	TKO	3 (6)	7 Dec 2013	Salle Roger Boileau, Meurthe-et-Moselle, France	
23	Win	19–4	Rio Hidaka	UD	8	24 May 2013	Mielparque Hall, Osaka, Japan	
22	Loss	18–4	Fabrice Aurieng	TD	5 (10)	15 Mar 2013	Salle Mermoz, Yutz, France	For vacant French heavyweight title
21	Win	18–3	Tomas Mrazek	PTS	8	8 Dec 2012	Salle Roger Boileau, Meurthe-et-Moselle, France	
20	Loss	17–3	Richard Towers	TKO	9 (12), 0:48	16 Jun 2012	Manchester Velodrome, Manchester, England	For vacant European Union heavyweight title
19	Win	17–2	Maksym Pedyura	KO	2 (8)	10 Dec 2011	Salle Roger Boileau, Meurthe-et-Moselle, France	
18	Win	16–2	Ferenc Zsalek	TKO	1 (6)	1 Oct 2011	Salle Mermoz, Yutz, France	
17	Loss	15–2	Mike Perez	TKO	1 (3), 0:54	7 May 2011	Alexandra Palace, London, England	Prizefighter 18: The International Heavyweights – semi-final
16	Win	15–1	Evgeny Orlov	SD	3	7 May 2011	Alexandra Palace, London, England	Prizefighter 18: The International Heavyweights – quarter-final
15	Win	14–1	Paata Berikashvili	RTD	1 (6), 3:00	16 Apr 2011	Salle Des Fêtes De L'Hôtel De Ville, Villerupt, France	
14	Win	13–1	Pavels Dolgovs	KO	4 (6)	12 Mar 2011	Salle Mermoz, Yutz, France	
13	Loss	12–1	Robert Helenius	TKO	6 (12), 0:39	21 Aug 2010	Messehalle, Erfurt, Germany	For vacant European Union heavyweight title
12	Win	12–0	Edgars Kalnars	TKO	3 (8)	10 Sep 2009	Cirque d'hiver, Paris, France	
11	Win	11–0	Carlos Takam	UD	8	27 Jun 2009	La Palestre, Le Cannet, France	
10	Win	10–0	Marouan Larouiche	UD	10	23 Apr 2009	Cirque d'hiver, Paris, France	Won vacant French heavyweight title
9	Win	9–0	Zine Eddine Benmakhlouf	TKO	1 (6)	11 Dec 2008	Cirque d'hiver, Paris, France	
8	Win	8–0	Daniil Peretyatko	TKO	4 (6)	5 Jun 2008	Cirque d'hiver, Paris, France	
7	Win	7–0	Leonardo Sanchez	TKO	3 (6)	19 Apr 2008	Salle Des Fêtes De L'Hôtel De Ville, Villerupt, France	
6	Win	6–0	Cyril Leonet	KO	1 (6)	8 Mar 2008	Palais Des Sports St Symphorien, Metz, France	French Tournament Semi-Final
5	Win	5–0	Marin Galateanu	KO	2 (6)	5 Jan 2008	Marmoutier, Bas-Rhin, France	
4	Win	4–0	Francesco Rosselli	KO	1 (4)	1 Dec 2007	Salle Roger Boileau, Meurthe-et-Moselle, France	
3	Win	3–0	Ion Voica	KO	1 (4)	26 May 2007	Salle Roger Boileau, Meurthe-et-Moselle, France	
2	Win	2–0	Emmanuel Marc	KO	1 (4)	28 Apr 2007	Salle Des Fêtes De L'Hôtel De Ville, Villerupt, France	
1	Win	1–0	Pavel Virgil	TKO	1 (4)	9 Dec 2006	Meurthe-et-Moselle, France	

== Mixed martial arts record ==
Professional record breakdown
1 match	1 win	0 losses
By submission	1	0

Res.	Record	Opponent	Method	Event	Date	Round	Time	Location	Notes
Win	1–0	Alessandro de Oliveira	Submission (Neck Crank)	Knock Out Championship 1	May 12, 2007	2	2:46	Cognac, France	

== Championships and accomplishments ==
=== Kickboxing ===
- 2014 WKN World K-1 Rules Super-Heavyweight Champion +96,6 kg (3 Title Def.)
- 2012 WAKO Pro World Low-Kick Rules Super-Heavyweight champion +94.2 kg
- 2008 King Of The Ring of KO World Series in Auckland
- 2007 K-1 Rules Kick Tournament in Marseilles runner up
- 2006 K-1 Canarias runner up
- 2006 I.S.K.A. Intercontinental Freestyle Rules champion
- 2005 K-1 France Grand Prix in Marseilles runner up
- 2003 K-1 World Grand Prix Preliminary France champion
- 2002 K-1 World Grand Prix Preliminary Marseilles champion
- 2001 WIKDF Drakka Fight Intercontinental Kickboxing champion
- 2000 WPKA European champion
- 2000 WPKA Amateur European Kickboxing champion
- 2000 French Kickboxing champion
- 1996 French Kickboxing champion
- 1995 French Kickboxing champion

=== Muaythai ===
- 2005 WKBC World Muaythai champion (1 Title Defense)
- 2000 French Muaythai champion
- 1999 French Muaythai champion
- 1996 French Muaythai champion

=== Professional boxing ===
- 2009 French Boxing champion
- 2008 French Boxing Heavyweight Tournament champion

== See also ==
- List of K-1 events
- List of male kickboxers
- Muay Thai
- Boxing
