= Azem Maksutaj =

Swiss kickboxer (born 1975)

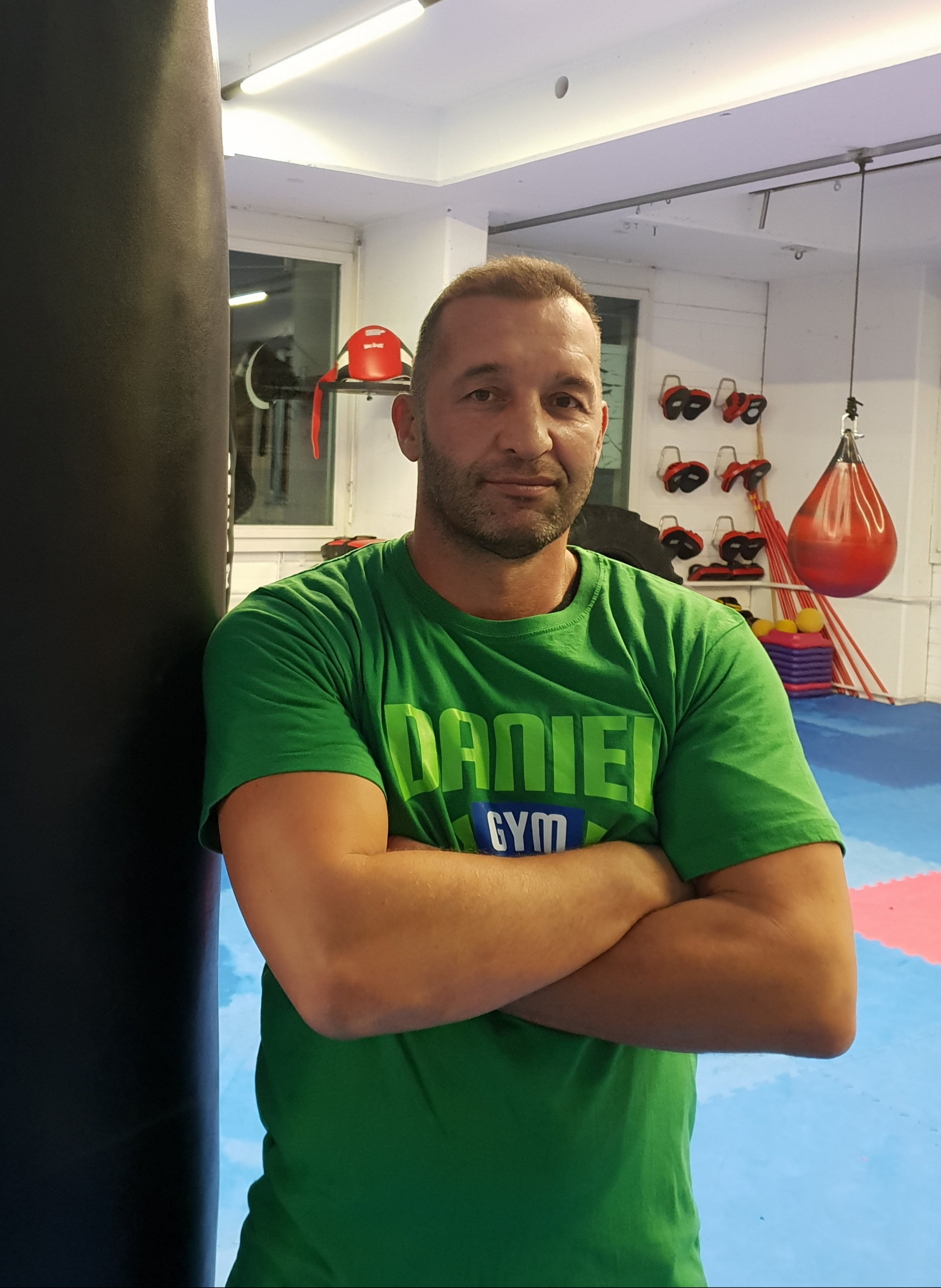
- Born: July 8, 1975 (age 51); Deçan, SAP Kosovo, SFR Yugoslavia
- Other names: The Black Eagle; The Warrior
- Nationality: Swiss
- Height: 183 cm (6 ft 0 in)
- Weight: 94 kg (207 lb; 14 st 11 lb)
- Division: Lightweight; Welterweight; Middleweight; Super Middleweight; Light Heavyweight; Cruiserweight; Heavyweight
- Style: Kickboxing • Muay Thai
- Fighting out of: Azem Kampfsport
- Years active: 1992–2010

Kickboxing record
- Total: 100
- Wins: 76
- By knockout: 57
- Losses: 22
- By knockout: 7
- Draws: 2

Other information
- Website: https://www.azem.ch/

Azem Maksutaj^{[a]} (born 8 July 1975) is a Swiss former kickboxer of Kosovar Albanian origin. He competed in lightweight, welterweight, middleweight, super middleweight, light heavyweight, cruiserweight, and heavyweight divisions. Originally from Kosovo (then part of SFR Yugoslavia), he relocated to Switzerland and began training in Muay Thai at fifteen. After winning the Swiss national title as a lightweight in his first year of competitions in 1992, he won the European and world honors in 1994 while fighting around the 77 kg (170 lb; 12 st 2 lb) super middleweight mark. In the late 1990s, he moved between light heavyweight and cruiserweight divisions, taking five world titles. He eventually moved to heavyweight in 2001, where he spent the remainder of his career, acting as a journeyman in the K-1 promotion and winning four other world titles. He won fourteen world titles in various weight divisions before retiring in 2010 with a hundred professional contests.

== Early life ==
Maksutaj, a Kosovar Albanian, was born in 1975 in Deçan, SFR Yugoslavia (now Kosovo), as the second of four children. His father moved to Switzerland as a guest worker in the late 1970s, so Maksutaj saw him only sparingly while growing up. In 1990, at fifteen, Maksutaj and the rest of his family reunited with his father in Winterthur, Switzerland, during the wave of Yugoslav immigration to the country. Unable to speak the language and struggling to integrate, he soon began training in Muay Thai at the Wing Thai Gym to escape his troubles.

== Career ==
=== Career beginnings (1992–1997) ===
After twelve months of training and his first year of competition, Maksutaj won the Swiss national Muay Thai -63.5 kg (140 lb; 10 st 0 lb) title in 1992 by beating Jesus Perez, who was eleven years his senior by knockout in the second round.

At eighteen, he knocked out Sweden's Thomas Rasmussen on 7 May 1994, to win the European -72.5 kg (160 lb; 11 st 6 lb) Muay Thai title in his hometown of Winterthur. Later that year, he traveled to Milan, Italy, where he defeated local fighter Sergio Bertolazzi by a fifth-round knockout to claim the World Muay Thai Association World Middleweight (-76.2 kg (168 lb; 12 st 0 lb)) Championship. He lost the world title to Perry Ubeda on 19 March 1995, in Nijmegen, Netherlands, after being knocked down three times in the first round."

On 10 June 1995, Maksutaj was invited to fight at Japan's K-1 Fight Night, the first event held by the K-1 promotion outside Japan, in Zurich, Switzerland. There, he lost to Surinamese veteran Orlando Wiet via a second-round knockout. Returning to K-1 a year later at K-1 Fight Night II on 2 June 1996, he lost against Seido karate stylist Taiei Kin. He was knocked down in round two and lost by a unanimous decision after a five-round tussle. He ended that year's campaign with a knockout of Faizal Reding on 2 November 1996, in Zurich, to take the International Sport Karate Association World Super Middleweight (78.1 kg (172 lb; 12 st 4 lb)) championship.

=== Dominance at light heavyweight and cruiserweight (1998–2000) ===
He defended his ISKA world title for the first time by defeating Frenchman Moussa Sissoko within three rounds in Winterthur on 7 November 1998. Following this, Maksutaj moved up to the light heavyweight class and returned to K-1, winning three world titles in five months in 1999. After his comeback to K-1 on June 5, 1999, at K-1 Fight Night '99, where he earned his first victory in the promotion by flooring Winston Walker three times in the third round en route to a technical knockout win, he headed to Pula, Croatia, a month later to challenge double world champion Igor Ivošević. He knocked his opponent out in round four and won both the World Association of Kickboxing Organizations' Pro World Light Heavyweight (81.4 kg (179 lb; 12 st 11 lb)) and the WKA World Super Light Heavyweight (83.2 kg (183 lb; 13 st 1 lb)) belts. Maksutaj closed the year out with a fifth world championship win, outpointing his Surinamese opponent Ashwin Balrak for the World Professional Kickboxing League (WPKL) World Light Heavyweight (-79 kg (174 lb; 12 st 6 lb)) title in Sarajevo, Bosnia and Herzegovina on 11 December 1999.

In 2000, Maksutaj moved back down to super middleweight to successfully challenge for the WKA World Super Middleweight (-76 kg (168 lb; 12 st 0 lb)) Championship, winning on points over Ivica Sukošić in Pristina, Kosovo. He then returns to light heavyweight and KO Aurélien Duarte in a World Professional Kickboxing Council (WPKC) World Light Heavyweight (-79 kg (174 lb; 12 st 6 lb)) title bout in Pavia, Italy before moving up in weight once again to cruiserweight where he knocked out Eddy Corremans in round three to be crowned the WPKC World Cruiserweight (-86 kg (190 lb; 13 st 8 lb)) Champion in Winterthur. A rematch between Maksutaj and Faizal Reding was at K-1 Fight Night 2000 on 3 June 2000, where Maksutaj won by TKO in round two.

=== Heavyweight division (2001–2010) ===
In 2001, Maksutaj moved to the heavyweight division, kicking off his career by winning the WPKC World Super Heavyweight (+95 kg (209 lb; 14 st 13 lb)) Muay Thai Championship. Following this up with a defense of his WPKC Cruiserweight title against Hubert Lisovski in Winterthur, he had perhaps the biggest triumph of his career at that point when he defeated Clifton Brown inside one round in front of over 100,000 spectators at the 2001 King's Cup at Sanam Luang in Bangkok, Thailand on 6 December.

Maksutaj competed in eight one-night tournaments in K-1's heavyweight division over the next five years and debuted in the Grand Prix format at the K-1 World Grand Prix 2002 Preliminary Marseilles on 25 January. Having scored two first-round KOs over Abdel Lamidi and Ferenc Gasztany in the run-up, Maksutaj lost a majority decision to Grégory Tony in the final. On 13 April 2002, Maksutaj had a re-match with Vitali Akhramenko at the K-1 World Grand Prix 2002 Preliminary Croatia in Zagreb. The pair had fought to a draw five years earlier and did so again as the judges could not pick a winner after five rounds. He was granted a chance at revenge against Gregory Tony the following month at the K-1 World Grand Prix 2002 in Paris, but the Frenchman came out on top again by winning a five-round majority decision.

Outside K-1, Maksutaj picked up the WKA World Cruiserweight (-85.9 kg (189 lb; 13 st 7 lb)) belt from Chino Mordillo in Zurich. He forced two standing eight counts on the Spaniard, initially by damaging his arm with a blocked roundhouse kick, before defeating him with a high kick in round two. He ended the year on a low note, however, as he was handed his first stoppage loss in seven years by Peter Varga in Padua, Italy on 30 November 2002, losing his WPKC Super Heavyweight Muay Thai title.

Maksutaj returned to Marseille to compete in the K-1 World Grand Prix 2003 Preliminary France on 24 January 2003. He knocked out Rob Lloyd in the quarter-finals and outpointed Miloš Kopták in the semis, before losing to his rival Gregory Tony for the third time in the final by unanimous decision. With K-1 heading back to Switzerland with the K-1 World Grand Prix 2003 in Basel tournament on 30 May 2003, Maksutaj was invited as a participant along with seven other European heavyweights. He lost to Larry Lindwall at the opening stage. In his next outing a month later, Maksutaj fought outside Europe for the first time, losing a unanimous judges' decision to Shingo Koyasu at K-1 Beast II 2003 in Saitama, Japan on 29 June 2003. Breaking a three-fight losing streak, he defeated Tihamér Brunner by decision on 13 December 2003, for the WMTA World Super Heavyweight title in a victorious homecoming to Winterthur.

Fighting at the annual Marseille K-1 qualifier for the third year running, Maksutaj fought Aziz Khattou in a non-tournament bout at K-1 Marseilles 2004 World Qualification on 24 January 2004, and lost a split decision. A rematch with Clifton Brown in Bangkok followed on 11 June 2004, and the outcome was the same, as Maksutaj stopped the Canadian inside the opening round. He fought Björn Bregy in Zurich on 25 September 2004. Maksutaj gave up around 32 kg (71 lb; 5 st 1 lb) in weight. He was dropped with a right cross at the beginning of the second round but made a comeback soon after when he knocked down his opponent with a right hook.

After losing to Christian N'ka in the opening round of the K-1 France Grand Prix 2005 in Marseilles on 19 January 2005, Maksutaj next competed in the K-1 Scandinavia Grand Prix 2005 held on May 21 in Stockholm, Sweden. He was drawn against the three-time K-1 North American champion Michael McDonald in the quarter-finals, and the two smaller, more technical heavyweights traded punches back-and-forth. In round two, McDonald forced a standing eight count on Maksutaj who then rallied back and floored him with a kick to the body. Round three saw the referee give McDonald another eight count when the Canadian took what was deemed too long to return to his feet after being pushed over by Maksutaj. After the regulation three rounds, the bout was ruled a draw and so an extension round was added to decide the victor, in which McDonald earned the majority decision win. Due to the fight, McDonald could not continue in the tournament.

A rematch between Maksutaj and McDonald was promptly booked for the quarter-finals of the K-1 World Grand Prix 2005 in Las Vegas II on August 13 and Maksutaj won by a unanimous decision. In the semis, he lost to Russian amateur standout Ruslan Karaev by unanimous decision after another bout. Round two saw him dropped with a spinning back kick to the body in the opening seconds and then a points deduction for kneeing Karaev in the face after he had slipped to the ground. Maksutaj was knocked down again in the final round after taking a knee from Karaev. On September 24, 2005, in Winterthur, Maksutaj lost his WPKC World Super Heavyweight (+95 kg (209 lb; 14 st 13 lb)) K-1 rules title, an accolade he had won earlier in the year, to Gary Turner on points. Shortly after, though, he knocked out Radan Frenchichi in his hometown to be crowned as the ISKA World Heavyweight (-96.4 kg (213 lb; 15 st 3 lb)) Champion.

On February 17, 2006, Maksutaj outfought James Phillips to a unanimous decision at the K-1 European League 2006 in Bratislava. Then, on May 20, 2006, at the K-1 Scandinavia Grand Prix 2006 in Stockholm, he KO'd his former conqueror Larry Lindwall in two to win the WMC World Heavyweight (-95 kg (209 lb; 14 st 13 lb)) Championship, his fourteenth and final world title belt. After re-matching with James Phillips in Lucerne, Switzerland on June 3, 2006, and winning on points again, Maksutaj returned to the fight capital of the world and faced the stiffest test of his career in the form of Ray Sefo. Going down at the K-1 World Grand Prix 2006 in Las Vegas II on 12 August 2006, Sefo sent Maksutaj to the canvas twice in round one, once in round two and twice again in three, forcing referee Steve Mazzagatti to stop the fight. He fared no better in his next match when he took on Jörgen Kruth at the K-1 World MAX North European Qualification 2007 in Stockholm on 24 November 2006, as he lost by KO from a knee midway through the opening round.

In an attempt to turn his fortunes around, he competed in the K-1 Rules Heavyweight Tournament 2007 in Turkey four-man competition in Istanbul on January 13, 2007, where he faced Kaoklai Kaennorsing, a two-time Rajadamnern Stadium champion renowned for taking fights with much larger opponents and defeating the majority of them, in the semi-finals. Although Maksutaj had the size advantage for the first time in his K-1 career, he was unable to capitalize on this and lost by unanimous decision after an extension round. He struggled with Kaoklai's classical Thai style throughout and was given two contested counts, one in round two and another in the extension round, although both of these strikes seemed to be low blows. In his next outing on May 19, 2007, he lost by technical knockout against Nathan Corbett, the eventual tournament champion, in the quarter-finals of the K-1 Fighting Network Scandinavian Qualification 2007 in Stockholm.

Maksutaj returned to the local circuit to stop his losing streak and took several wins including a points victory over Erhan Deniz in Bratislava, Slovakia on 7 September 2007, before returning to K-1 at the K-1 World Grand Prix 2008 in Amsterdam on 26 April 2008, to face an up-and-coming Tyrone Spong. He got dropped from a knee to the body early in the opening stanza and was knocked down again with punches at the end of the round. The second knockdown did not count as he was saved by the bell, but Spong soon finished him with another knee strike to the body in the second, bringing Maksutaj's losing streak in K-1 to five. In one of his last fights before retiring, he was awarded a disqualification win over Domagoj Ostojić after his Croatian opponent continued to punch and kick him after knocking him to the canvas in round one of their contest in Zadar, Croatia on 11 May 2008.

Maksutaj made a brief comeback on 29 January 2010, knocking out Jean-Luc Ajinca in three rounds at Bern's Wankdorfhalle.

== Personal life ==
Maksutaj got married in Winterthur, Switzerland on 1 June 2007. His son was born a few weeks later. A documentary of his life and career entitled Being Azem was released in 2010.

== Championships and awards ==
=== Kickboxing ===
==== European Muay Thai Association ====
- EMTA European Middleweight (-72.5 kg/159 lb) Championship

==== International Sport Karate Association ====
- ISKA World Super Middleweight (78.1 kg/172 lb) Championship
- ISKA World Heavyweight (-96.4 kg/212 lb) Championship

==== K-1 ====
- K-1 World Grand Prix 2002 Preliminary Marseilles Runner-up
- K-1 World Grand Prix 2003 Preliminary France Runner-up

==== Schweizerische Muay Thai Verbände ====
- SMTV Swiss Lightweight (-63.5 kg/140 lb) Championship

==== World Association of Kickboxing Organizations ====
- WAKO Pro World Light Heavyweight (81.4 kg/179 lb) Championship

==== World Kickboxing Association ====
- WKA World Super Middleweight (-76 kg/167 lb) Championship
- WKA World Super Light Heavyweight (83.2 kg/183 lb) Championship
- WKA World Cruiserweight (85.9 kg/189 lb) Championship

==== World Muay Thai Association ====
- WMTA World Middleweight (-76.2 kg/168 lb) Championship
- WMTA World Super Heavyweight Championship

==== World Muaythai Council ====
- WMC World Heavyweight (-95 kg/209 lb) Championship

==== World Professional Kickboxing Council ====
- WPKC World Light Heavyweight (-79 kg/174 lb) Championship
- WPKC World Cruiserweight (-86 kg/189 lb) Championship
- WPKC World Super Heavyweight (+95 kg/209 lb) K-1 Championship
- WPKC World Super Heavyweight (+95 kg/209 lb) Muay Thai Championship

==== World Professional Kickboxing League ====
- WPKL World Light Heavyweight (-79 kg/174 lb) Championship

== Kickboxing record ==
Kickboxing record
76 wins (57 KOs), 22 losses, 2 draws
Date	Result	Opponent	Event	Location	Method	Round	Time
2010-01-29	Win	(France) Jean-Luc Ajinca		Bern, Switzerland	KO	3	
2008-05-11	Win	(Croatia) Domagoj Ostojić	Obračun u Ringu 8	Zadar, Croatia	DQ (attack on a downed opponent)	1	
2008-04-26	Loss	(Suriname) Tyrone Spong	K-1 World Grand Prix 2008 in Amsterdam	Amsterdam, Netherlands	KO (left knee to the body)	2	0:45
2008-00-00	Win	(Bosnia and Herzegovina) Senad Hadžić	Kings of Fullcontact	Bern, Switzerland	Decision	3	3:00
2007-09-07	Win	(Turkey) Erhan Deniz	Noc Bojovnikov 4	Bratislava, Slovakia	Decision	3	3:00
2007-05-19	Loss	(Australia) Nathan Corbett	K-1 Fighting Network Scandinavian Qualification 2007, Quarter Finals	Stockholm, Sweden	TKO	2	2:40
2007-01-13	Loss	(Thailand) Kaoklai Kaennorsing	K-1 Rules Heavyweight Tournament 2007 in Turkey, Semi Finals	Istanbul, Turkey	Extension round decision (unanimous)	4	3:00
2006-11-24	Loss	(Sweden) Jörgen Kruth	K-1 World MAX North European Qualification 2007	Stockholm, Sweden	KO (right knee)	1	1:30
2006-08-12	Loss	(New Zealand) Ray Sefo	K-1 World Grand Prix 2006 in Las Vegas II	Las Vegas, Nevada, USA	TKO (referee stoppage)	3	2:02
2006-06-03	Win	(Germany) James Phillips	K-1 Gala in Luzern	Lucerne, Switzerland	Decision (unanimous)	3	3:00
2006-05-20	Win	(Sweden) Larry Lindwall	K-1 Scandinavia Grand Prix 2006	Stockholm, Sweden	KO (right punch)	2	1:51
Wins the WMC World Heavyweight (-95 kg/209.4 lb) Championship.
2006-02-17	Win	(Germany) James Phillips	K-1 European League 2006 in Bratislava	Bratislava, Slovakia	Decision (unanimous)	3	3:00
2005-00-00	Win	(France) Radan Frechichi		Winterthur, Switzerland	KO	3	
Wins the ISKA World Heavyweight (-96.4 kg/212 lb) Championship.
2005-00-00	Win	(Portugal) Arthur Sequeira		Winterthur, Switzerland	TKO (punches)	3	
2005-09-24	Loss	(England) Gary Turner	Fight Night Winterthur	Winterthur, Switzerland	Decision (unanimous)	5	3:00
Loses the WPKC World Super Heavyweight (+95 kg/209 lb) K-1 Championship.
2005-08-13	Loss	(Russia) Ruslan Karaev	K-1 World Grand Prix 2005 in Las Vegas II, Semi Finals	Las Vegas, Nevada, USA	Decision (unanimous)	3	3:00
2005-08-13	Win	(Canada) Michael McDonald	K-1 World Grand Prix 2005 in Las Vegas II, Quarter Finals	Las Vegas, Nevada, USA	Decision (unanimous)	3	3:00
2005-05-21	Loss	(Canada) Michael McDonald	K-1 Scandinavia Grand Prix 2005, Quarter Finals	Stockholm, Sweden	Extension round decision (majority)	4	3:00
2005-01-19	Loss	(France) Christian N'ka	K-1 France Grand Prix 2005 in Marseilles, Quarter Finals	Marseille, France	Decision	3	3:00
2004-09-25	Win	(Switzerland) Björn Bregy	Fists of Fury 4	Zurich, Switzerland	KO (right hook)	2	
2004-06-11	Win	(Canada) Clifton Brown	K-1 Fight	Bangkok, Thailand	KO	1	2:15
2004-01-24	Loss	(Belgium) Aziz Khattou	K-1 Marseilles 2004 World Qualification	Marseille, France	Decision (split)	3	3:00
2003-12-13	Win	(Hungary) Tihamér Brunner		Winterthur, Switzerland	Decision	5	3:00
Wins the WMTA World Super Heavyweight Championship.
2003-06-29	Loss	(Japan) Shingo Koyasu	K-1 Beast II 2003	Saitama, Japan	Decision (unanimous)	3	3:00
2003-05-30	Loss	(Sweden) Larry Lindwall	K-1 World Grand Prix 2003 in Basel, Quarter Finals	Basel, Switzerland	Decision	3	3:00
2003-01-24	Loss	(France) Grégory Tony	K-1 World Grand Prix 2003 Preliminary France, Final	Marseille, France	Decision (unanimous)	3	3:00
For the K-1 World Grand Prix 2003 Preliminary France Championship.
2003-01-24	Win	(Czech Republic) Miloš Kopták	K-1 World Grand Prix 2003 Preliminary France, Semi-Finals	Marseille, France	Decision (unanimous)	3	3:00
2003-01-24	Win	(England) Rob Lloyd	K-1 World Grand Prix 2003 Preliminary France, Quarter Finals	Marseille, France	KO	1	2:03
2002-11-30	Loss	(Hungary) Péter Varga	Kickboxing Mondiale 3	Padua, Italy	KO	4	
Loses the WPKC World Super Heavyweight (+95 kg/209 lb) Muay Thai Championship.
2002-00-00	Win	(Spain) Chino Mordillo		Zurich, Switzerland	TKO (right high kick)	2	
Wins the WKA World Cruiserweight (-85.9 kg/189 lb) Championship.
2002-05-25	Loss	(France) Grégory Tony	K-1 World Grand Prix 2002 in Paris	Paris, France	Decision (majority)	5	3:00
2002-04-13	Draw	(Belarus) Vitali Akhramenko	K-1 World Grand Prix 2002 Preliminary Croatia	Zagreb, Croatia	Draw	5	3:00
2002-01-25	Loss	(France) Grégory Tony	K-1 World Grand Prix 2002 Preliminary Marseilles, Final	Marseille, France	Decision (majority)	3	3:00
For the K-1 World Grand Prix 2002 Preliminary Marseilles Championship.
2002-01-25	Win	(Hungary) Ferenc Gasztany	K-1 World Grand Prix 2002 Preliminary Marseilles, Semi Finals	Marseille, France	KO	1	0:59
2002-01-25	Win	(France) Abdel Lamidi	K-1 World Grand Prix 2002 Preliminary Marseilles, Quarter Finals	Marseille, France	KO	1	1:15
2001-12-06	Win	(Canada) Clifton Brown	King's Cup 2001	Bangkok, Thailand	KO	1	
2001-00-00	Win	(France) Hubert Lisovski	Winterthur Gladiator Fight Night	Winterthur, Switzerland	Decision	5	3:00
Retains the WPKC World Cruiserweight (-86 kg/189 lb) Championship.
2001-00-00	Win	(France) David Ismalon		Pavia, Italy	KO	3	
2000-06-03	Win	(Netherlands) Faizal Reding	K-1 Fight Night 2000	Zurich, Switzerland	TKO (punches)	2	0:47
2000-00-00	Win	(Belgium) Eddy Corremans	Winterthur Asia Fight Night	Winterthur, Switzerland	KO	3	
Wins the WPKC World Cruiserweight (-86 kg/189 lb) Championship.
2000-00-00	Win	(France) Aurélien Duarte		Pavia, Italy	KO	4	
Wins the WPKC World Light Heavyweight (-79 kg/174 lb) Championship.
2000-00-00	Win	(Croatia) Ivica Sukošić		Pristina, Kosovo	Decision	5	3:00
Wins the WKA World Super Middleweight (-76 kg/167 lb) Championship.
1999-12-11	Win	(Suriname) Ashwin Balrak		Sarajevo, Bosnia and Herzegovina	Decision	5	3:00
Wins the WPKL World Light Heavyweight (-79 kg/174 lb) Championship.
1999-07-00	Win	(Croatia) Igor Ivošević		Pula, Croatia	KO	4	
Wins the WAKO Pro World Light Heavyweight (81.4 kg/179.5 lb) Championship and the WKA World Super Light Heavyweight (83.2 kg/183 lb) Championship.
1999-06-05	Win	(England) Winston Walker	K-1 Fight Night '99	Zurich, Switzerland	TKO (punches)	3	2:04
1998-11-07	Win	(France) Moussa Sissoko		Winterthur, Switzerland	KO	3	
Retains the ISKA World Super Middleweight (78.1 kg/172 lb) Championship.
1997-00-00	Draw	(Belarus) Vitali Akhramenko		Zagreb, Croatia	Draw	5	3:00
1996-11-02	Win	(Netherlands) Faizal Reding		Zurich, Switzerland	KO	3	
Wins the ISKA World Super Middleweight (78.1 kg/172 lb) Championship.
1996-06-02	Loss	(Japan) Taiei Kin	K-1 Fight Night II	Zurich, Switzerland	Decision (unanimous)	5	3:00
1995-06-10	Loss	(Suriname) Orlando Wiet	K-1 Fight Night	Zurich, Switzerland	KO (left punch)	2	2:45
1995-03-19	Loss	(Netherlands) Perry Ubeda		Nijmegen, Netherlands	KO	1	
Loses the WMTA World Middleweight (-76.2 kg/168 lb) Championship.
1994-00-00	Win	(Italy) Sergio Bertalozzi		Milan, Italy	KO	5	
Wins the WMTA World Middleweight (-76.2 kg/168 lb) Championship.
1994-05-07	Win	(Sweden) Thomas Rasmussen		Winterthur, Switzerland	KO (punches)	4	
Wins the EMTA European Middleweight (-72.5 kg/159 lb) Championship.
1992-00-00	Win	(Switzerland) Jesus Perez		Winterthur, Switzerland	KO	2	
Wins the SMTV Swiss Lightweight (-63.5 kg/140 lb) Championship.
Legend: Win Loss Draw/No contest Notes

== Notes ==
a.	Albanian spelling: Azem Maksutaj, Serbo-Croat Cyrillic spelling: Азем Максутај.
