= Jan Nortje =

South African boxer and mixed martial artist

- Born: Johannes Nortje; 11 April 1975 (age 51); Cape Town, South Africa
- Other names: The Giant
- Height: 2.11 m (6 ft 11 in)
- Weight: 151 kg (333 lb; 23 st 11 lb)
- Division: Super Heavyweight; Heavyweight
- Style: Kickboxing, Boxing
- Stance: Southpaw
- Fighting out of: Johannesburg, South Africa
- Team: Xtreme Couture; Steve's Gym; Team Nortje
- Trainer: Steve Kalakoda; Randy Couture; Ray Sefo; Fai Falamoe (2007, 2013)
- Years active: 1998–2008, 2013 (Kickboxing); 1999–2001 (Boxing); 2001–2003, 2007–2009, 2013 (MMA)

Professional boxing record
- Total: 11
- Wins: 11
- By knockout: 10
- Losses: 0

Kickboxing record
- Total: 25
- Wins: 9
- By knockout: 8
- Losses: 16
- By knockout: 11

Mixed martial arts record
- Total: 8
- Wins: 2
- By knockout: 2
- Losses: 6
- By knockout: 2
- By submission: 4

Other information
- Boxing record from BoxRec
- Mixed martial arts record from Sherdog

Johannes "Jan" Nortje (born 11 April 1975) is a South African professional kickboxer, mixed martial artist and boxer who has fought for Strikeforce, DREAM, K-1, Inoki Genome Federation, PRIDE Fighting Championship and New Japan Pro-Wrestling.

He has fought the likes of Jérôme Le Banner, Gary Goodridge, and K-1 Champions Mirko Cro Cop, Ernesto Hoost, Peter Aerts and Semmy Schilt. His last MMA fight was a loss against Rameau Thierry Sokoudjou at DREAM.9.

He lost to Lechi Kurbanov by way of an extension round split decision on 29 June 2013 in Grozny, Chechnya.

== Mixed martial arts record ==
Professional record breakdown
8 matches	2 wins	6 losses
By knockout	2	2
By submission	0	4

Res.	Record	Opponent	Method	Event	Date	Round	Time	Location	Notes
Loss	2–6	Sokoudjou	TKO (punches)	DREAM 9	26 May 2009	1	2:30	Yokohama, Japan	DREAM Super Hulk Grand Prix Opening Round; Super Heavyweight bout.
Win	2–5	Bob Sapp	TKO (punches)	Strikeforce: At The Dome	23 February 2008	1	0:55	Tacoma, Washington, United States	Super Heavyweight bout.
Loss	1–5	Gary Goodridge	TKO (punches)	Hero's 8	12 March 2007	1	3:00	Nagoya, Japan	
Loss	1–4	Masayuki Naruse	Submission (rear-naked choke)	K-1	31 December 2003	1	4:40	Nagoya, Japan	
Loss	1–3	Shinsuke Nakamura	TKO (submission to strikes)	NJPW Ultimate Crush	2 May 2003	2	3:12	Tokyo, Japan	
Win	1–2	Tadao Yasuda	TKO (corner stoppage)	Inoki Bom-Ba-Ye 2002	31 December 2002	2	0:57	Saitama, Saitama, Japan	
Loss	0–2	Yoshihisa Yamamoto	Submission (armbar)	PRIDE 18	23 December 2001	1	1:43	Fukuoka Prefecture, Japan	
Loss	0–1	Gary Goodridge	Submission (armbar)	K-1 Andy Memorial 2001 Japan GP Final	19 August 2001	1	1:11	Saitama, Saitama, Japan	

== K-1 kickboxing record ==
9 Wins (8 (T)KO's, 1 decision), 16 Losses (11 (T)KO's, 5 decisions)
Date	Result	Record	Opponent	Event	Method	Round	Time
06/29/2013	Loss	9–16	(Chechnya) Lechi Kurbanov	K-1 World Ichigeki Cup 2013	Ext. R Decision (split)	4	3:00
08/16/2008	Win	9–15	(United States) Tom Erikson	Deep: Gladiator	KO (left hook)	1	1:05
06/29/2008	Loss	8–15	(Netherlands) Peter Aerts	K-1 World GP 2008 in Fukuoka	TKO (referee stoppage)	3	2:49
04/26/2008	Loss	8–14	(Switzerland) Bjorn Bregy	K-1 World Grand Prix 2008 in Amsterdam	KO (punches)	1	1:10
12/08/2007	Win	8–13	(South Korea) Dong Wook-Kim	K-1 World Grand Prix 2007 Final	TKO (overhand right)	2	0:11
04/28/2007	Loss	7–13	(United States) Mighty Mo	K-1 World Grand Prix 2007 in Hawaii	KO (right cross)	2	1:50
04/28/2007	Win	7–12	(United States) Julius Long	K-1 World Grand Prix 2007 in Hawaii	TKO (low kicks)	2	1:56
08/13/2005	Loss	6–12	(United States) Imani Lee	K-1 World Grand Prix 2005 in Las Vegas II	Decision (unanimous)	3	3:00
11/06/2004	Loss	6–11	(Netherlands) Semmy Schilt	K-1 Titans 1st '04	TKO	2	0:57
08/07/2004	Loss	6–10	(Russia) Alexander Ustinov	K-1 World Grand Prix 2004 in Las Vegas II	Decision (unanimous)	3	3:00
06/06/2004	Loss	6–9	(United States) Tom Erikson	K-1 World Grand Prix 2004 in Nagoya	TKO (referee stoppage)	1	0:55
03/27/2004	Win	6–8	(South Africa) Mike Bernardo	K-1 World Grand Prix 2004 in Saitama	TKO (punch rush/3 knockdowns)	1	2:32
12/06/2003	Loss	5–8	(Sweden) Martin Holm	K-1 World Grand Prix 2003	KO	1	1:06
11/03/2003	Win	5–7	(Croatia) Ivan Rudan	New Japan Pro-Wrestling: Yokohama Dead Out	KO (punches)	1	0:19
07/13/2003	Loss	4–7	(Belarus) Alexey Ignashov	K-1 World Grand Prix 2003 in Fukuoka	KO	1	2:49
03/03/2003	Win	4–6	(Russia) Evgeny Orlov	K-1 World Grand Prix 2003 in Saitama	Decision (unanimous)	5	3:00
08/17/2002	Loss	3–6	(Netherlands) Ernesto Hoost	K-1 World Grand Prix 2002 in Las Vegas	KO	3	1:29
03/03/2002	Win	3–5	(Sweden) Jörgen Kruth	K-1 World Grand Prix 2002 in Nagoya	KO (right hook)	2	1:38
07/20/2001	Win	2–5	(Russia) Sergei Matkin	K-1 World Grand Prix 2001 in Nagoya	KO (punches)	2	1:01
04/29/2001	Loss	1–5	(Australia) Peter Graham	K-1 World Grand Prix 2001 in Osaka	Ext. R Decision (split)	4	3:00
05/28/2000	Loss	1–4	(France) Jérôme Le Banner	K-1 Survival 2000	KO (punch)	1	1:07
06/21/1999	Loss	1–3	(England) Matt Skelton	K-1 Braves '99 Quarter Finals	Decision (unanimous)	3	3:00
04/25/1999	Loss	1–2	(Croatia) Mirko Cro Cop	K-1 Revenge '99	KO (left hook)	4	1:58
10/28/1998	Win	1–1	(Japan) Mitsuya Nagai	K-1 Japan '98 Kamikaze	TKO (3 knockdowns)	1	2:51
04/09/1998	Loss	0–1	(England) Matt Skelton	K-1 Kings '98	TKO	3	0:47

== Professional boxing record ==
11 Wins (10 (T)KO's, 1 decision), 0 Losses
Date	Result	Opponent	Event	Method	Round	Time	
06/16/2001	Win	(Australia) Curtis McDorman	Cintas Center, Cincinnati, Ohio, United States	TKO	2	3:00	
06/02/2001	Win	(United States) JC Hilliard	Miccosukee Resort & Gaming, Miami, Florida, United States	TKO	2	0:17	
02/27/2001	Win	(Cameroon) Monthee Honore	Parow Civic Centre, Cape Town, Western Cape, South Africa	TKO	8	3:00	Wins Vacant All-African Heavyweight Title.
08/05/2000	Win	(United States) Mario Sailor	The Moon, Tallahassee, Florida, United States	TKO	1	3:00	
07/08/2000	Win	(South Africa) Ricky Peters	George, Western Cape, South Africa	TKO	1	1:15	
07/02/2000	Win	(South Africa) Clinton Nortje	Rygersdal Sports Complex, Rondebosch, Cape Town, Western Cape, South Africa	TKO	1	3:00	
04/30/2000	Win	(South Africa) Clinton Nortje	Cape Town, Western Cape, South Africa	TKO	2	3:00	
02/22/2000	Win	(South Africa) Armstrong M'bete	Bellville Velodrome, Cape Town, Western Cape, South Africa	KO	1	N/A	
12/18/1999	Win	(South Africa) Egan Norman	Club Mykanos Holiday Resort, Langebaan, Western Cape, South Africa	KO	1	0:10	
09/25/1999	Win	(Democratic Republic of the Congo) Jacob Lolwane	Nelspruit, Mpumalanga, South Africa	PTS	4	3:00	
05/16/1999	Win	(South Africa) James Thompson	Cape Town, South Africa	KO	1	0:16	

== Titles ==
- Former South African Kickboxing Superheavyweight Champion
- Former All-African Heavyweight Champion
- K-1 2007 World Grandprix in Hawaii Semi Finalist
