= K-1 PREMIUM 2005 Dynamite!! =

K-1 martial arts event in 2005

- The poster for K-1 PREMIUM 2005 Dynamite!!
- Promotion: K-1, Hero's
- Date: December 31, 2005
- Venue: Osaka Dome
- City: Osaka, Japan
- Attendance: 53,025

Event chronology
K-1 PREMIUM 2004 Dynamite!!	K-1 PREMIUM 2005 Dynamite!!	K-1 PREMIUM 2006 Dynamite!!

K-1 PREMIUM 2005 Dynamite!! was an annual kickboxing and mixed martial arts event held by K-1 and Hero's on New Year's Eve, Sunday, December 31, 2005 at the Osaka Dome in Osaka, Japan. It featured 7 HERO'S MMA rules fights, and 4 K-1 rules fights.

The event attracted a sellout crowd of 53,025 to the Osaka Dome, and was broadcast across Japan on the TBS Network.

In the main event, Norifumi "KID" Yamamoto defeated Genki Sudo in the finals of the Hero's Middleweight Tournament to become the first HERO'S Middleweight Champion.

The semi final match was a modified rules bout between Royce Gracie and Hideo Tokoro, which was declared a draw.

== Results ==
MMA bouts
Weight class				Method	Round	Time	Notes
Middleweight	Norifumi Yamamoto	def.	Genki Sudo	TKO (punches)	1	4:39	(Note: Finals of the HERO'S Middleweight Tournament For K-1 HERO'S Middleweight Championship)
	Royce Gracie	vs.	Hideo Tokoro	Draw	2	10:00	(Note: Special rules bout. Ruled a draw due to lack of judges.)
	Bobby Ologun	def.	Chad Rowan	Decision (unanimous)	3	3:00
	Katsuhiko Nagata	def.	Remigijus Morkevicius	Decision (unanimous)	2	5:00
	Yoshihiro Nakao	vs.	Heath Herring	NC (double foul)	1	0:00	(Note: As the referee was giving instructions, Nakao kissed Herring on the lips. Herring then punched Nakao, knocking him out cold. Nakao was unable to continue, and was ruled the winner by DQ. The fight was later ruled a no contest after the kiss was also ruled a foul.)
	Jerome Le Banner	def.	Alan Karaev	KO (body kick)	2	1:14
	Shungo Oyama	def.	Peter Aerts	Submission (heel hook)	1	0:30
K-1 bouts
Weight class				Method	Round	Time	Notes
	Semmy Schilt	def.	Ernesto Hoost	TKO (punches)	2	0:41
	Masato Kobayashi	def.	Akira Ohigashi	TKO	2	1:58
	Akio Mori	def.	Bob Sapp	Decision (unanimous)	3	3:00
	Remy Bonjasky	def.	Sylvester Terkay	Decision (split)	3	3:00

== 2005 Hero's Middleweight (154 lbs) Grand Prix ==
Quarterfinals
(Japan)	Kazuyuki Miyata
(Japan)	Genki Sudo	SUB
(Lithuania)	Remigijus Morkevičius
(Japan)	Hiroyuki Takaya	TKO
(Brazil)	Royler Gracie
(Japan)	Norifumi Yamamoto	KO
(Japan)	Hideo Tokoro
(Japan)	Caol Uno	DEC

Semifinals
(Japan)	Genki Sudo	SUB
(Japan)	Hiroyuki Takaya
(Japan)	Caol Uno
(Japan)	Norifumi Yamamoto	TKO

Final
(Japan)	Genki Sudo
(Japan)	Norifumi Yamamoto	TKO

== See also ==
- List of K-1 events
- List of male kickboxers
- PRIDE Shockwave 2005
