= World Muay Thai Association =

- Abbreviation: WMTA
- Formation: 1984
- Headquarters: Netherlands
- Location: Haarlem
- Region served: Worldwide
- Members: National associations
- Leader: Glen Huisman
- Website: http://www.wmta.nl/

The World Muay Thai Association (WMTA) is one of the oldest amateur and professional sanctioning organizations of Muay Thai in the world for the sport.

The WMTA was created in the Netherlands as the World Muay Thai Association in 1984 by Thom Harinck, a Dutch kickboxing trainer and founder of the Chakuriki Gym in Amsterdam. The organisation became one of the major sanctioning bodies for professional Muay Thai. Early stars of the WMTA included Branco Cikatic, Peter Aerts, Ernesto Hoost and Gilbert Ballantine. The WMTA is based in Haarlem, Netherlands. In 2009, Sayed Zeyada, Glen Huisman and Tim van Duijn took over the organization. In 2012, Sayed Zeyada left the WMTA.In 2018 Tim van Duijn retired.

The only recognized WMTA champion at this time is Dimangio Jano; he captured the WMTA Super Featherweight title at Gideon Jonkers Honor Fightleague, Curaçao on October 6, 2018.
