= K-1 World Grand Prix 2007 Final =

K-1 martial arts event in 2007

- The poster for K-1 World Grand Prix 2007 Final
- Promotion: K-1
- Date: December 8, 2007
- Venue: Yokohama Arena (Japan)
- City: Yokohama, Japan
- Attendance: 17,667
- Total purse: US$ 400,000

Event chronology
K-1 Championships 2007 German Finals	K-1 World Grand Prix 2007 Final	K-1 Fighting Network Prague 2007

K-1 World Grand Prix 2007 Final was a martial arts event held by the K-1 on Saturday December 8, 2007 at the Yokohama Arena in Yokohama, Japan. It was the 15th K-1 World GP Final, the culmination of a year full of regional elimination tournaments. All fights followed K-1's classic tournament format and were conducted under K-1 Rules, three rounds of three minutes each, with a possible tiebreaker.

The qualification for top eight fighters, K-1 World GP 2007 in Seoul Final 16 was held on October 28, 2007 in Seoul, Korea.

The event drew a sellout crowd of 17,667 to the Yokohama Arena. It was broadcast live in Japan on the Fuji TV network; in South Korea on XTM; in Hong Kong on PCCW; in Australia on Main Event; in Brazil on Globosat; in Canada on The Fight Network; in Romania on ProTV; in Hungary on RTL Klub and across Scandinavia on Viasat. With all the delayed broadcasts bringing it to a total of 135 countries. The English language commentary team was headed by an Australian Michael Schiavello, with four time K-1 World Champion Ernesto Hoost, Ray Sefo and Akebono. The event ring announcer was Jimmy Lennon Jr.

== K-1 World Grand Prix 2007 Final Tournament ==
Final 16
(France) Jérôme Le Banner	KO
(South Korea) Yong-soo Park
(South Korea) Choi Hong-man	DEC
(United States) Mighty Mo
(Netherlands) Semmy Schilt	TKO
(Poland) Paul Slowinski
(Brazil) Glaube Feitosa	DEC
(Germany) Chalid Arrab
(Morocco) Badr Hari	TKO
(New Zealand) Doug Viney
(Netherlands) Remy Bonjasky	KO
(Germany) Stefan Leko
(Netherlands) Peter Aerts	TKO
(New Zealand) Ray Sefo
(Japan) Yusuke Fujimoto
(Japan) Junichi Sawayashiki	TKO

Quarter Finals
(France) Jérôme Le Banner	DEC
(South Korea) Choi Hong-man
(Netherlands) Semmy Schilt	DEC
(Brazil) Glaube Feitosa
(Morocco) Badr Hari
(Netherlands) Remy Bonjasky	DEC
(Netherlands) Peter Aerts	KO
(Japan) Junichi Sawayashiki

Semi Finals
(France) Jérôme Le Banner
(Netherlands) Semmy Schilt	TKO
(Netherlands) Remy Bonjasky
(Netherlands) Peter Aerts	DEC

Final
(Netherlands) Semmy Schilt	TKO
(Netherlands) Peter Aerts

== Results ==
Opening Fights: K-1 Rules / 3Min. 3R

Mitsugu Noda (Japan) def. Noel Cadet (France)
Noda defeated Cadet by TKO at 1:13 of the 2nd Round.

Jan Nortje (South Africa) def. Dong-wook Kim (South Korea)
Nortje defeated Kim by TKO (Punch) at 0:11 of the 2nd Round.

Takashi Tashikawa (Japan) def. Ki-min Kim (South Korea)
Tashikawa defeated Kim by KO at 1:21 of the 1st Round.

Reserve Fight: K-1 Rules / 3Min. 3R Ext.1R

Paul Slowinski (Poland) def. Mighty Mo (United States)
Slowinski defeated Mo by TKO (Low Kicks) at 0:50 of the 2nd Round.

Quarter Finals: K-1 Rules / 3Min. 3R Ext.1R

Jérôme Le Banner (France) def. Choi Hong-man (South Korea)
Le Banner defeated Choi by 3rd Round Unanimous Decision 3-0 (30-29, 30-28, 30-29).

Semmy Schilt (Netherlands) def. Glaube Feitosa (Brazil)
Schilt defeated Feitosa by 3rd Round Unanimous Decision 3-0 (30-27, 30-28, 30-27).

Remy Bonjasky (Netherlands) def. Badr Hari (Morocco)
Bonjasky defeated Hari by 3rd Round Majority Decision 2-0 (30-29, 29-29, 30-29).

Peter Aerts (Netherlands) def. Junichi Sawayashiki (Japan)
Aerts defeated Sawayashiki by KO (Straight Right Punch) at 1:29 of the 1st Round.

Semi Finals: K-1 Rules / 3Min. 3R Ext.1R

Semmy Schilt (Netherlands) def. Jérôme Le Banner (France)
Schilt defeated Le Banner by TKO (Corner Stoppage) at 1:02 of the 2nd Round.

Peter Aerts (Netherlands) def. Remy Bonjasky (Netherlands)
Aerts defeated Bonjasky by 3rd Round Unanimous Decision 3-0 (30-29, 30-27, 30-28).

Super Fight: K-1 Rules / 3Min. 3R Ext.2R

Musashi (Japan) def. David Dancrade (France)
Musashi defeated Dancrade by KO (Left Mid Kick) at 2:59 of the 1st Round.

Final: K-1 Rules / 3Min. 3R Ext.2R

Semmy Schilt (Netherlands) def. Peter Aerts (Netherlands)
Schilt defeated Aerts by TKO (Knee Injury) at 1:49 of the 1st Round.

The tournament winner Semmy Schilt of Netherlands became the first fighter ever in K-1 history to win the Championship three years in a row and picked up a winner's purse of US$400,000.

For the last six years, the K-1 World GP Champion has been a Dutchman and in K-1's 15-year history, a Dutch fighter has won the World GP a total of 12 times.

Line-up changes before the event:

(Poland) Paul Slowinski replaces announced fighter (Germany) Chalid Arrab due to an Appendicitis.

(France) David Dancrade replaces announced fighter (France) Souleimane Konate due to an injury.

(New Zealand) Ray Sefo is not cleared to fight by the doctor due to an eye injury sustained during training. The Reserve Fight #2 is dropped from the card and his opponent Paul Slowinski is moved up to Reserve Fight #1.

== See also ==
- List of K-1 events
- K-1 World Grand Prix
- List of male kickboxers
