= Peter Aerts =

Dutch kickboxer

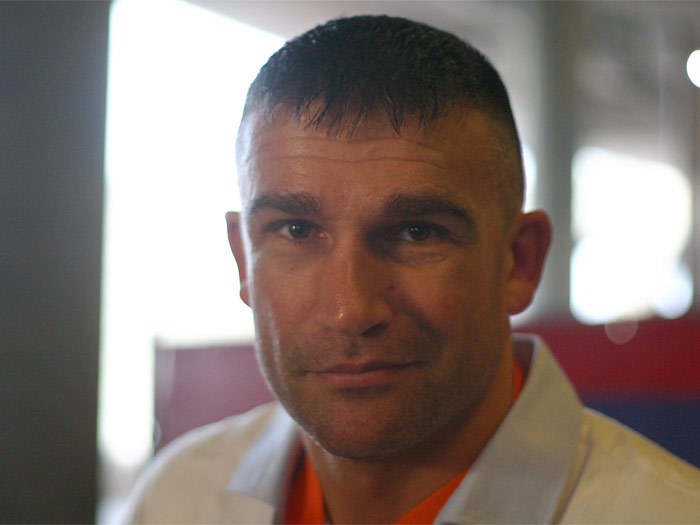
- Aerts in 2008
- Born: 25 October 1970 (age 55); Eindhoven, Netherlands
- Other names: The Dutch Lumberjack; Mr. K-1
- Height: 1.92 m (6 ft 3 1/2 in)
- Weight: 242 lb (110 kg; 17.3 st)
- Division: Heavyweight
- Reach: 84 in (213 cm)
- Style: Kickboxing, Muay Thai
- Stance: Orthodox
- Fighting out of: Amsterdam, Netherlands
- Team: Judoka-Kickboxing (1984–1987); The Champs (1989–1991); Chakuriki Gym (1991–1997); Mejiro Gym (1997–2004); Team Aerts (2004–present)
- Trainer: Mikki Benazzouz (1984–1987); Eddy Smulders (1989–1991); Thom Harinck (1991–1997); Andre Mannaart (1997–2004); Jan Plas (2004–2009); Thom Harinck (2009–present)
- Rank: 6th dan in Kyokushin Budokai
- Years active: 1985–2014, 2017–2020 (Kickboxing); 2005, 2015 (MMA)

Kickboxing record
- Total: 145
- Wins: 108
- By knockout: 81
- Losses: 35
- By knockout: 20
- Draws: 2

Mixed martial arts record
- Total: 3
- Wins: 1
- By knockout: 1
- Losses: 2
- By submission: 1
- By decision: 1

Other information
- Notable students: Mourad Bouzidi, William Diender, Leroy Kaestner, Robin van Roosmalen
- Website: http://www.peteraerts.com
- Mixed martial arts record from Sherdog
- Last updated on: 19 January 2020

Peter Aerts (born 25 October 1970) is a Dutch retired kickboxer. Known for his devastating high kicks, which earned him the nickname "The Dutch Lumberjack", he is widely considered to be one of the greatest heavyweight kickboxers of all time.

Born in Eindhoven, Netherlands, Aerts began training in Taekwondo at the age of fourteen. He won his first world title when he was nineteen years old in 1990, taking the International Kick Boxing Federation's Heavyweight Championship. He would also add the Dutch heavyweight title and the World Muay Thai Association's heavyweight title to his mantelpiece before going on to compete in Japan. He competed in every K-1 World Grand Prix except one, in 2009.

A three-time K-1 World Grand Prix Champion, he debuted at the inaugural K-1 World GP in 1993 where he was eliminated by fellow K-1 legend Ernesto Hoost. He won his first Grand Prix in 1994 by knocking out Rob van Esdonk and Patrick Smith in the quarter-finals and semi-finals, respectively, before taking a unanimous decision over Masaaki Satake in the finals. However, he was stopped on more than one occasion by Mike Bernardo, being memorably knocked out of the 1996 K-1 World GP at the quarter-finals, as part of his series of wins over Aerts.

Aerts also won the GP the following year when he beat Toshiyuki Atokawa, Ernesto Hoost and then stopped Jérôme Le Banner in the finals. He would not win the tournament again until 1998 when he stopped all three of his opponents in front of 63,800 spectators at the Tokyo Dome. In what is considered to be one of the best Grands Prix ever, and the pinnacle of Aerts' career, he stopped Masaaki Satake with a knee strike in the quarters, forced the referee to stop his semi-final match with long-time rival Mike Bernardo and knocked out Andy Hug with one of his famous high kicks in the final. He won this tournament in six minutes and forty-three seconds, which was the quickest K-1 GP win ever at the time. This record stood until 2009 when it was beaten by rival Semmy Schilt.

Although 1998 was his last Grand Prix win, Aerts continued to compete and reached the final a further three times (in 2006, 2007 and 2010).

== Early life ==
Aerts was born in Eindhoven, North Brabant, Netherlands on October 25, 1970. After playing football in his childhood for seven years, he began practicing martial arts in 1983, beginning with taekwondo. His interest in combat sports came from his grandfather and an uncle; both were active in that field. In 1984, he started kickboxing and began training in "Judoka-Kickboxing" in Best, with Mikki Benazzouz. After a year of training, Aerts fought his first match, and soon one victory succeeded the other. He won his first world championship title when he was nineteen.

== Career ==
=== 1985–1992: Early career ===
Aerts debuted as a professional kickboxer in 1985. Some notable fights from his early career include a decision loss to Ernesto Hoost (who he would fight a total of six times) on 20 November 1988, and a knockout loss to Andre Mannaart in 1989 while still a teenager. Aerts switched to "The Champs" gym in Eindhoven, with Eddy Smulders, in 1989 where he won his first world title, taking the IKBF World Heavyweight Championship in 1990.

1991 saw Aerts switch gyms again, this time moving to the famous Chakuriki Gym under Thom Harinck, where he had his greatest successes of his career. He received the moniker "The Dutch Lumberjack" by the trainer of his opponent Mark Russell after he defeated Russell by first-round stoppage in Oranjestad, Aruba on 29 June 1991. Aerts was given his signature sleeveless lumberjack jacket, which he would wear during his ring walk before every match, by his friend Bas Rutten. Coincidentally, Aerts' father was also a lumberjack. On 18 November 1991, Aerts defeated the legendary Frank Lobman via unanimous decision in Rotterdam to win the WMTA World Heavyweight Muay Thai Championship.

In 1992, Aerts truly moved onto the world stage. He beat Maurice Smith by decision after nine rounds in Paris, France, on 9 April 1992. Just a month later, on 16 May, he knocked out Adam Watt in the second round in Tokyo, Japan.

He rematched Frank Lobman on 20 September 1992. Aerts emerged the victor once again and retained the WMTA title as Lobman retired in round three. He ended the year with a draw against karate fighter Masaaki Satake in Osaka, Japan, on 4 October 1992.

=== 1993: K-1 debut ===
On January 29, 1993, Aerts defeated Peter Selkthorpe of England by first-round knockout with a knee strike to win the European Muay Thai title in Best, Netherlands. He then rematched Maurice Smith in Amsterdam on March 7, 1993, and knocked him out with a right high kick, a technique that would become Aerts' signature move.

These wins gave Aerts the reputation as a top-level kickboxer and he was invited to take part in the K-1 Grand Prix '93, an eight-man, one-night tournament made up of the world's best heavyweights and light heavyweights held in Tokyo, Japan. He faced Ernesto Hoost in the quarter-finals, and after a close three rounds, Hoost was named the winner by majority decision (29–28, 30–28, 30–30).

He returned to K-1 on September 4, 1993, against Dino Homsey at K-1 Illusion and KO'd the American with a left high kick in round one. Fifteen days later in Amsterdam, Aerts made the first defence of his WMTA World Heavyweight Muay Thai Championship against Rob van Esdonk, knocking him out with a right hook less than a minute into round four.

=== 1994–1995: Successive K-1 World Grand Prix Championships ===
Aerts knocked out Markus Fuckner of Germany on February 20, 1994, in Amsterdam to retain the WMTA Heavyweight Muay Thai title before heading out to Japan to take part in the K-1 Grand Prix '94 which was held in Tokyo on April 30, 1994. In the quarter-finals, Aerts was drawn against Rob van Esdonk whom he had defeated in the Netherlands six months earlier. Van Esdonk knocked Aerts down in round one but Aerts was able to come back and KO him with a right high kick. In the semis, he faced Patrick Smith, an American with a wild, aggressive style. Aerts was still able to handle him, however, and KO'd him just over one minute into the first round. Progressing into the final, he came up against Masaaki Satake for the second time. Aerts simply landed more powerful and a larger number of strikes on Satake en route to a unanimous decision (27-25, 30–25, 30–29) victory. This made him the 1994 K-1 World Grand Prix Champion.

He returned to the ring on September 12, 1994, at the Night of the Stars tournament in Rotterdam. At the quarter-final stage, he faced Rob van Esdonk for the third time and Lumberjack'd him with the high kick again. He then knocked out Glenn Wijngaart in the semis and went into the final against Frank Lobman, who was thirty-eight at this point and facing Aerts for the third time. Aerts battered Lobman until his corner threw in the towel in round two.

Aerts then made the third defence of his WMTA World Heavyweight Muay Thai title against Ergin Solmaz in Amsterdam on November 12, 1994, before going back to Japan to fight Glen Parker at K-1 Legend. He knocked Parker out with a knee in round one.

On March 3, 1995, he defeated Kirkwood Walker via right low kick knockout in round three at the K-1 Grand Prix '95 Opening Battle which qualified him for the K-1 Grand Prix '95 on May 4. In the quarter-finals, he dispatched Japanese karateka Toshiyuki Atokawa with ease, knocking him out with punches in the first round. He went up against Ernesto Hoost for the third time in the semis in what was another close fight. After three rounds, the judges called it a draw and so it went to an extra round, after which Aerts took the unanimous decision (10-9, 10–9, 10–9). In the final, Aerts came up against hard-hitting Frenchman Jérôme Le Banner who had knocked out his two opponents in the run-up to the final. The fight did not last long, as Aerts finished Le Banner with a body shot in round one to become the K-1 World Grand Prix Champion for the second year running.

Aerts then beat Michael Thompson by KO in a superfight at the K-3 Grand Prix '95 in Nagoya on July 16, 1997 before beating Hubert Numrich by points for the WMTA World Super Heavyweight Muay Thai Championship in Amsterdam on October 28, 1995. He ended the year with a forty-second KO win over Mike Bernardo, the hard hitting South African known for his punching power, at K-1 Hercules on December 9, 1995. This would be the first of six meetings between the men from 1995 to 1998, in what became one of the biggest feuds in K-1 history.

=== 1996–1997: Rivalry with Mike Bernardo, and split from Chakuriki ===
On March 10, 1996, Aerts knocked out Jean-Claude Leuyer with a highlight-reel high kick at the K-1 Grand Prix '96 Opening Battle in Yokohama to qualify for the 1996 K-1 World Grand Prix.

At the K-1 Grand Prix '96 on May 6, he came up against Mike Bernardo again at the quarter-final stage. Already a dominant name in K-1 and the reigning Grand Prix champion, Aerts was the favorite to win the 1996 tournament and as he had demolished Bernardo just six months earlier, he was expected to do the same this time. It was not to be, however, and after a slow first round, Bernardo turned the fight into a brawl in the second. The referee gave Aerts a count in round two, and in round three Bernardo knocked Aerts out with a right hook. Bernardo had broken Aerts' nineteen-fight winning run, and became the first man to beat him in since Ernesto Hoost in 1993.

Aerts was given the chance to avenge this loss at K-1 Revenge '96 four months later, on September 1, 1996, when the rubber match was made between the pair. Anticipation was high, but the fight was an anticlimax. In the first round, Aerts caught Bernardo with an inadvertent low blow. When Bernardo was unable to continue, Aerts was disqualified.

This settled nothing of course, and K-1 quickly booked the rematch to the rematch, this time for October 16 and K-1 Star Wars '96. Aerts knocked Bernardo down in round one and continued to hurt him with low kicks throughout the fight. In round two, the referee gave Aerts a standing eight count but he contested this as he simply stumbled after throwing a kick. By the third round, Aerts had started to take a beating and Bernardo KO'd him with a right hook towards the end of the round. After going undefeated in almost twenty fights over three years, Aerts had now lost three times in-a-row, all to Mike Bernardo.

In 1997, Aerts broke his working relationship with Thom Harinck and the Chakuriki Gym and went to train under former opponent Andre Mannaart at the Mejiro Gym.

He returned to the ring for the first time since his trilogy with Mike Bernardo on March 16, 1997, at K-1 Kings '97 where he had the first of his four meetings with legendary Swiss Kyokushin fighter Andy Hug. Hug was the 1996 K-1 Grand Prix Champion, but Aerts was able to overwhelm him and forced the referee to stop the match in round one. He then continued to get back on track by TKOing Jean-Claude Leuyer at K-1 Braves '97 on April 29, 1997, and KOing Jérôme Le Banner at K-1 Dream '97 on July 20, 1997.

He qualified for the 1997 K-1 GP when he beat James Warring at the K-1 Grand Prix '97 1st round on September 7, 1997. At the beginning of the fight, Warring pretended that he wanted to sportsmanly touch gloves with Aerts and then attempted to sneakily punch him with a right overhand when he got close to him. Aerts was able to dominate the rest of the fight before knocking him cold with a right high kick in round three.

At the K-1 Grand Prix '97 Final on November 9, Aerts came up against Mike Bernardo for the fifth time at the first stage. Aerts used his superior speed to pick Bernardo apart with punches before finishing him with a body shot in round three. This brought their rivalry to 2-2, discounting the disqualification. Marching into the semi-finals, he had his second match against Andy Hug. After three hard-fought rounds, Hug was given the nod via unanimous decision (30-29, 30–28, 30–28) and Aerts was eliminated.

=== 1998: Third K-1 World Grand Prix title ===
Aerts kicked off 1998 with a majority decision victory over Ernesto Hoost, their third fight, at K-1 Kings '98 on April 9. He then travelled to Zürich, Switzerland to fight Andy Hug for his WKA World Super Heavyweight Muay Thai Championship at K-1 Fight Night '98 on June 6, 1998. Hug defeated Aerts via unanimous decision after five rounds to retain his title.

He also lost his next fight against the Brazilian karateka Francisco Filho at K-1 Dream '98 on July 18, 1998. Aerts knocked Filho down in round one but the match was stopped by the doctor at the end of the round as Aerts had a large cut on his shin, and Filho was awarded the victory.

He soon returned to form, however, knocking out Sinisa Andrijasevic in round two at the K-1 World Grand Prix '98 opening round on September 27, 1998, to qualify for the K-1 Grand Prix '98 Final Round on December 13. Kickboxing had become a mainstream phenomenon in Japan by this time and the event was attended by more than 60,000 spectators at the Tokyo Dome. Drawn against Masaaki Satake at the quarter-final stage, he wrecked the Japanese fans' favourite with knees from the Thai clinch inside the first round. In the semis, he came up against his old nemesis Mike Bernardo. Knowing that Bernardo is a very religious Christian, Aerts came into the ring with "666" written on his lumberjack shirt. Aerts knocked him down twice in round one and forced the referee to stop the bout, sending him into the final against Andy Hug. This brought an end to their rivalry with an overall tally at 3–2 to Aerts, discounting the DQ. The final between Aerts and Hug lasted just a minute and ten seconds as Aerts knocked him out with a trademark high kick to win his third K-1 World Grand Prix.

This was the fastest tournament win in K-1 history, as he knocked out all of his opponents in the very first round in a record time of 6:43 minutes, until Semmy Schilt won the World Grand Prix in 2009 in 5:54 minutes.

=== 1999–2002: Poor showings at the Grand Prix ===
Peter Aerts began 1999 in a rich vein of form, finishing Michael McDonald, Jim Mullen, Matt Skelton, Maurice Smith and Sam Greco, respectively, over the course of five months. At the K-1 World Grand Prix '99 opening round, the qualifying round for the 1999 K-1 WGP, on October 5, 1999, he took a unanimous decision victory over Lloyd van Dams. In the quarter-finals of the K-1 Grand Prix '99 final round on December 5, 1999, Aerts went up against Jérôme Le Banner for the third time. Just fifteen seconds into the first round, he dropped the big Frenchman with a high kick. Although dazed and clearly hurt, Le Banner was able to make the count and came back to knock Aerts out with a devastating left hook at just over the one minute-mark of round number one, sending the reigning champion crashing out of the tournament.

Following this loss, he returned to the ring against Japanese star Musashi at K-1 Rising 2000 a little over a month later on January 25, 2000. Aerts won by technical knockout when Musashi's corner stopped the fight at the end of round four. On April 23, 2000, he defeated Ray Sefo via low kick KO in round three at K-1 The Millennium. This would be the first of three fights between the legends.

Aerts continued his win-streak when he knocked out Andrew Thomson in fifty-six seconds at K-1 King of the Ring 2000 in Bologna, Italy, on May 12, 2000. This run came to an end, however, when he came up against Cyril Abidi, a promising young French fighter, at K-1 Spirits 2000 on July 7, 2000. Abidi managed to drag Aerts into a brawl and caused a huge upset by KOing him in round one. Aerts was then given the chance to prove this loss was simply a fluke when he rematched Abidi in the quarter-finals of the K-1 World Grand Prix 2000 in Yokohama, a qualifying tournament for the 2000 World Grand Prix. He was unable to do so, however, and Abidi stopped him en route to the final.

Despite having lost his last two fights and failing to win a K-1 qualifying tournament, Aerts was still invited to the K-1 World Grand Prix 2000 Final at the Tokyo Dome on December 10, 2000, due to his status as one of the world's top kickboxers. At the quarter-final stage, he was given his rubber match with Cyrl Abidi. Aerts dominated the fight this time, and knocked Abidi down with a two-punch combination just seconds after the opening bell. He took a unanimous decision (29-26, 29–28, 29–26) after three rounds. However, during the fight, Abidi headbutted Aerts numerous times which caused a cut on his forehead. Due to this cut, Aerts could not advance in the tournament and was replaced by Abidi in the semis.

Aerts would then KO Stuart Green in round one in a superfight at the K-1 Holland GP 2001 in Arnhem on February 4, 2001, his first fight in the Netherlands in almost six years. After a decision loss to Mirko Cro Cop at K-1 Gladiators 2001 and a TKO win over Nobu Hayashi at K-1 Burning 2001 in early 2001, he entered the K-1 World Grand Prix 2001 in Las Vegas on August 11, 2001. After knocking out Noboru Uchida in the quarter-finals of the tournament, he had his fourth fight with Maurice Smith in the semis and went 4–0 over the American with an extra round unanimous decision. In the final, he was KO'd by Stefan Leko late in the third round.

At the K-1 World Grand Prix 2001 Final on December 8, 2001, Aerts went up against Francisco Filho at the first stage. Aerts developed a large hemotoma on his left foot when Filho blocked one of his kicks with his knee. Due to this, Aerts' corner stopped the fight at the end of round two and he was eliminated from the tournament.

He kicked off 2002 with wins over Nicholas Pettas and Andrei Kirsanov in the first half of the year before losing a majority decision to Alexey Ignashov at the K-1 World Grand Prix 2002 in Fukuoka on July 14, 2002. He qualified for the 2002 K-1 World Grand Prix final eight when he won a unanimous decision (30-27, 30–27, 30–27) victory over Glaube Feitosa at the K-1 World Grand Prix 2002 Final Elimination on October 5, 2002. At the K-1 World Grand Prix 2002 on December 7, 2002, Aerts was eliminated from the Grand Prix at the quarter-final stage for the fourth year running when he was beaten by Ray Sefo via split decision (29-30, 30–28, 30–29).

=== 2003–2005: Becoming "Mr. K-1" ===
Aerts did not achieve the same level of success in the 2000s as he did in his earlier K-1 career, he continued to compete. And while Andy Hug died and other old-school legends Branko Cikatić, Mike Bernardo, Sam Greco, Ernesto Hoost and Stan Longinidis all retired, Aerts continued to face the new generation of stars.

Stefan Leko defeated Peter Aerts for the second time on March 30, 2003, at the K-1 World Grand Prix 2003 in Saitama. He rebounded from two consecutive defeats, however, and knocked out Tsuyoshi Nakasako with a high kick at K-1 Beast II 2003 on June 29, 2003 before qualifying for the 2003 K-1 WGP by beating Jerrel Venetiaan via unanimous decision (30-29, 30–29, 30–28) at K-1 World Grand Prix 2003 Final Elimination on October 11, 2003. In the quarter-finals of the K-1 World Grand Prix 2003 Final on December 6, Aerts went up against Alexey Ignashov. After a close three rounds, the fight was scored a draw and went to an extra round. Aerts was judged the winner unanimously (10-9, 10–9, 10–9) and advanced into the semis for the first time since he won the Grand Prix in 1998. Against Musashi in the second stage was another close decision. This time, however, the judges went in favour of Aerts' opponent and Musashi won a majority decision (30-30, 30–29, 30–29).

In 2004, Aerts left Mejiro Gym to found Team Aerts, training out of Kops Gym in Amsterdam under Henri Hooft and Jan Plas. After six months out of the ring, he returned against Gary Goodridge at the K-1 World Grand Prix 2004 in Nagoya on June 6, 2004. After withstanding the Trinidadian brawler's initial onslaught, Aerts brutalised Goodridge with low kicks over two and a half rounds. Although Goodridge was still game, he could barely stand and the referee stopped the fight in round three. Aerts then defeated Michael McDonald by unanimous decision (30-29, 30–29, 29–27) at the K-1 World Grand Prix 2004 Final Elimination on September 25, 2004, to qualify for the K-1 World GP final eight. The K-1 World Grand Prix 2004 Final, held on December 4, 2004, saw Aerts go up against South African boxer Francois Botha in the quarter-finals. Aerts lost in the first round when he could not continue after injuring his leg while low kicking Botha.

After a relatively poor 2004, Aerts went into 2005 with an extra round unanimous decision (9.5-8, 10–8.5, 10–8) over American prospect Carter Williams in a superfight at the K-1 World Grand Prix 2005 in Seoul on March 19, 2005. Williams' aggressive style had Aerts backtracking for much of the fight, but he was still able to show his class and take victory in the deciding round. He picked up another win over Mighty Mo at the K-1 World Grand Prix 2005 in Osaka - Final Elimination on September 23, 2005, to ensure his place at the 2005 World Grand Prix. Mo showed signs of damage from Aerts' kicks towards the end of the first round, and Aerts was able to finish him with a low kick in round two. In the quarter-finals of the K-1 World Grand Prix 2005 in Tokyo Final on November 19, 2005, he faced Jérôme Le Banner for the fourth time. The fight started slowly, with both men showing respect for each other's power, but went on to be an exciting and close match. The judges scored it a draw after three rounds and it went into an extra round to decide the winner. All three judges agreed that Aerts was the winner (10-9, 10–9, 10–9). Injury would hinder him once again, however, and he was forced to pull out of the Grand Prix as he could not fight again that night. Having made his debut in mixed martial arts on July 6, 2005, when he knocked out former sumo wrestler Wakashoyo at Hero's 2, Aerts returned for his second and last MMA bout against judoka Shungo Oyama at K-1 PREMIUM 2005 Dynamite!! on December 31, 2005. Aerts was clearly unfamiliar with grappling and was submitted with a heel hook by Oyama as soon as the fight went to the ground at the 0:30 mark of round one.

=== 2006–2007: So close and yet so far ===
On March 5, 2006, Aerts went into the ring with the 212 cm (6 ft 11 1/2 in) 2005 K-1 World Grand Prix Champion Semmy Schilt in a superfight at the K-1 World Grand Prix 2006 in Auckland. After three rounds, Aerts was given the majority decision (28–28, 28–28, 29–28) win over the giant karate fighter. This win proved that, while his performances against top-tier competition had been waning in recent years, he was still a world-class kickboxer.

In his next fight, Aerts faced fellow K-1 legend Ernesto Hoost (the fifth and final meeting between the pair) at the K-1 World Grand Prix 2006 in Amsterdam on May 13, 2006. The circumstances surrounding the match were rather bizarre as Hoost was scheduled to face Bob Sapp that night and Aerts was only there to commentate for television. However, Sapp ran from the Amsterdam ArenA and Aerts stepped in to replace him, and had to borrow a pair of fighting shorts from Semmy Schilt (which had Schilt's name written on them and displayed the Golden Glory gym's logo). Despite having not trained for the fight, Aerts was still able to last all three rounds with Hoost and lost a majority decision (30–29, 30–28, 30–30).

Then, following a knockout win over Hiraku Hori at the K-1 World Grand Prix 2006 in Seoul in June and a decision victory against Gary Goodridge at the K-1 World Grand Prix 2006 in Sapporo in July, Aerts faced Musashi in a tournament reserve fight at the K-1 World Grand Prix 2006 in Tokyo Final on December 2, 2006. He defeated Musashi by first-round KO, and after Remy Bonjasky was forced to withdraw from the Grand Prix due to an injury, Aerts took his place and met Glaube Feitosa in the semi-finals. After knocking the karate man down with a barrage of strikes in round two, the referee stopped the fight and Aerts went through to the final where a rematch with reigning champion Semmy Schilt awaited. He was unable to reenact his March 2006 performance, however, and Schilt took a unanimous decision (30-27, 30–27, 30–28) after three rounds. Schilt knocked him down with a knee in round two and dominated the fight overall with his size advantage.

On June 23, 2007, at the K-1 World Grand Prix 2007 in Amsterdam, Aerts faced Bob Sapp in a much-anticipated superfight. In what was a rather anticlimactic affair, Aerts struck Sapp with the left knee, Sapp fell down and the fight was over in 0:25 of the first round. He then KO'd Nicholas Pettas with a sensational high kick at the K-1 World Grand Prix 2007 in Hong Kong on August 5, 2007 before going up against Ray Sefo at the K-1 World Grand Prix 2007 in Seoul Final 16 on September 29, 2007. He won the fight at the end of the first round by TKO (corner stoppage) when Sefo did not answer the bell. As a result of his victory, Aerts qualified for his 15th consecutive K-1 World Grand Prix .

The K-1 World Grand Prix 2007 Final was held on December 8, 2007, at the Yokohama Arena. After a quick knockout of Junichi Sawayashiki in the quarter-finals, he met two-time K-1 World Grand Prix winner Remy Bonjasky in the semis and dominated him en route to a unanimous decision (30-29, 30–27, 30–28) win which would take him into the final for a rubber match with defending champion Sem Schilt. Midway through the first round, Aerts went down in pain clutching his right knee. He was unable to continue due to injury once again and Schilt regained the title.

=== 2008–2011: Later K-1 career and legend status ===
Aerts began 2008 with a TKO win over South African giant Jan Nortje at the K-1 World Grand Prix 2008 in Fukuoka on 29 June, before meeting Semmy Schilt for the fourth time at the K-1 World Grand Prix 2008 in Seoul Final 16 on September 27. Aerts won by majority decision (30–29, 30–29, 30–30) to bring their rivalry to 2-2 and qualify for the K-1 World Grand Prix 2008 Final which was held on 6 December 2008. He was eliminated at the first stage by K-1 Heavyweight Champion Badr Hari. Aerts gave a poor performance in the match, and was knocked down less than twenty seconds into round one. In the second round, Hari dominated even more and forced the referee to stop the fight.

Following this poor showing, many critics and fans believed that, at 38 years old, Aerts was too old and past his prime. Nonetheless, he was determined to return to form and began training under Thom Harinck again in early 2009. With Harinck back in his corner, Aerts faced Errol Zimmerman in a superfight at the K-1 World Grand Prix 2009 in Yokohama. Although the fight went to an extra round decision which Aerts won unanimously (10-9, 10–9, 10–9), he looked like a much improved fighter. Following this, he knocked out former world cruiserweight boxing champion Yosuke Nishijima with a low kick in round three at a K-1 World Grand Prix 2009 in Tokyo Final 16 Qualifying GP superfight. With two good showings under his belt that year, Aerts then went up against Alistair Overeem at the K-1 World Grand Prix 2009 in Seoul Final 16 on 26 September 2009. Despite Overeem's youth, size and strength advantage, Aerts was still the favourite going into the fight as Overeem had primarily spent his career as an MMA fighter and not a kickboxer. Although there were no knockdowns in the match, Overeem dominated over three rounds and took the unanimous decision (30-27, 30–27, 30–27).

After this fight, Aerts dropped more weight under a diet that Harinck set for him, dropping to 103 kg as opposed to his usual 109–112 kg. He took part in a tournament reserve bout at the K-1 World Grand Prix 2009 Final on 5 December 2009, defeating Gökhan Saki by unanimous decision (30-27, 29–27, 29–28). None of the tournament fighters were withdrawn, however, so this was the first time since the tournament's founding in 1993 that Aerts had not competed at the K-1 World Grand Prix.

Aerts continued to drop weight, and on 3 April 2010, he faced K-1 Heavyweight (-100kg) Champion Kyotaro for the title at the K-1 World Grand Prix 2010 in Yokohama. He came into the fight at 97 kg. Despite looking in good shape, he was knocked down twice in the first round (although the second knockdown did not count as it came just as the bell sounded) before getting knocked out with one of Kyotaro's famous punches in the second.

Following this defeat, Aerts regained some of the weight that he had lost for his match against dreadlocked karate man Ewerton Teixeira at the K-1 World Grand Prix 2010 in Seoul Final 16 on 2 October 2010. A close match, it was decided by an extra round unanimous decision (10-9, 10–9, 10–9) in favour of Aerts who then qualified for the K-1 World Grand Prix 2010 Final on 11 December. In his 17th appearance at the K-1 WGP, he defeated Mighty Mo by first-round KO in the quarter-finals. In the semi-finals, he came face to face with his archrival Semmy Schilt, in a fight where he was a huge underdog due to his age and Schilt's success in the 2009 Grand Prix. After being cut above the eye and finishing the fight with a swollen face, Aerts won a brilliantly fought decision. However, he had taken a lot of damage in the fight with Schilt and started to cough up blood in his changing room after the fight. He was overwhelmed by a less damaged and much fitter and bigger Alistair Overeem and lost by first-round TKO. Though he was defeated, he broke three world records in K-1: He became the oldest man (at 40 years old) to ever make it to the K-1 World Grand Prix Final, he marked the most appearances (6) that any fighter had ever made it to the final, and also became the first person to ever beat Semmy Schilt in a tournament.

Aerts was expected to face Melvin Manhoef at the K-1 World Grand Prix 2011 in Nanjing Final 16 on 29 October 2011. However, the event was cancelled with K-1 experiencing severe financial problems. With his December schedule clear for the first time in 18 years, he defeated Japanese fighter Mr. Kamikaze by first-round TKO on a show titled Hinokuni Kakuto Densetsu Legend 2 on December 11, 2011.

=== 2012–present: Semi-retirement and sporadic appearances ===
His next fight was a TKO loss against Tyrone Spong at an It's Showtime event on 30 June 2012 in Brussels, Belgium. After that fight, Aerts signed a contract to compete exclusively for at least the next two years with GLORY, a newly formed kickboxing league which numerous top champions joined following the demise of K-1.

He competed in the sixteen-man 2012 Glory Heavyweight Grand Slam at Glory 4: Tokyo - 2012 Heavyweight Grand Slam in Saitama, Japan on 31 December 2012 but injury forced him to bow out of the tournament at the first stage. He performed well in round one of his bout with his one-time student Mourad Bouzidi but broke his right hand in the process and was unable to come out for the second round.

He fought Jamal Ben Saddik at Glory 8: Tokyo on 3 May 2013 at the Ariake Coliseum. A poor start to the fight for Aerts saw him dropped early and he was fortunate to survive the first round. However, in a dramatic turnaround in the second, he came out aggressive and floored the giant Moroccan three times, forcing a referee stoppage.

In what was publicized as his retirement match, Aerts lost a tightly contested split decision to Rico Verhoeven at Glory 13: Tokyo, Japan on 21 December 2013.

Aerts was initially expected to compete in a heavyweight tournament at GFC Series 1 in Dubai, United Arab Emirates on 29 May 2014. However, a press statement issued by the promotion later stated that he would fight on the card in a one-off fight against Dewey Cooper. Aerts fought to a draw with Cooper, tearing his hamstring during the match.

Aerts fought Freddy Kemayo at Fight Night Saint-Tropez II in Saint-Tropez, France on 4 August 2014, losing by TKO as a result of a leg injury in round two.

He then faced Ernesto Hoost for the sixth time on 19 October 2014 in Osaka for the vacant WKO World Heavyweight Championship. The 49-year-old Hoost won by unanimous decision after three, two-minute rounds.

In June 2015, Aerts – at 44 years old – officially announced his retirement via video at a press conference for an upcoming kickboxing show in Japan that he was scheduled to appear on. Aerts noted that he had sustained some injuries in his October fight with Ernesto Hoost, and when he was unable to fully recover from those injuries, he made the decision to retire.

Aerts' retirement was short-lived, however, and he returned to the ring to compete in his third mixed martial arts match, against the debuting Estonian sumo wrestler Baruto Kaito at Rizin World Grand Prix 2015: Part 2 at the Saitama Super Arena on 31 December 2015. He lost to his larger opponent via a lopsided unanimous decision.

In yet another retirement match, Aerts was scheduled to face Tsotne Rogava at WFL 5: Champion vs. Champion in Almere on 23 April 2017, but his opponent was later changed to Nordine Mahieddine. Aerts defeated Mahieddine by unanimous decision to record his 105th career win. Afterwards, he was joined in the ring by fellow Dutch kickboxing legends Ernesto Hoost, Remy Bonjaskyn and Semmy Schilt, who were on hand to congratulate the retiring Aerts.

Aerts took part in a scoreless exhibition bout against Atakan Arslan at MFC 24 in İzmir, Turkey on 27 January 2018.

On 26 July 2018, Aerts lost by unanimous decision to Jan Soukup at Yangames Fight Night 6 in Prague, Czech Republic.

He defeated Christian Müller via KO due to a knee strike in the first round of their match at La Familia Fight Night X in Halle, Germany on 4 May 2019.

The 49-year-old Aerts won against 45-year-old Brazilian-Japanese opponent Jairo Kusunoki via a low kick KO early in the second round at HEAT 46 in Tokyo on 19 January 2020.

== Professional wrestling ==
Peter Aerts
Personal information
- Born: 25 October 1970 (age 55) Eindhoven, Netherlands

Professional wrestling career
- Ring name(s): Absolute Champion; Peter Aerts; The Dutch Lumberjack; Mr. K-1
- Billed height: 192 cm (6 ft 4 in)
- Billed weight: 107 kg (236 lb; 16 st 12 lb)
- Billed from: Enschede, Netherlands
- Trained by: Inoki Genome Federation
- Debut: August 27, 2011

In 2011, Aerts began competing as a professional wrestler in the Inoki Genome Federation. He debuted on August 27, 2011, against Shinichi Suzukawa at IGF: Super Stars Festival '11 and won by brutalizing his opponent until the referee stopped the match. He then knocked out Hideki Suzuki at IGF 17 on September 3, 2011. In his third match, Aerts teamed up with Bobby Lashley to face Kazuyuki Fujita and Kendo Kashin in a tag team match at Inoki Bom-Ba-Ye 2011 on December 2, 2011. The match ended when Lashley held Fujita by the arms and let Aerts deliver one of his famous kicks to his head, knocking him out. A rematch between Aerts and Fujita then took place at Fight For Japan: Genki Desu Ka Omisoka 2011 on December 31, 2011. Fujita was able to take his revenge, submitting Aerts with a Boston crab which looked like it may have legitimately hurt him.

== Film and television ==
Aerts played a fictionalized version of himself in the 2011 Dutch comedy film New Kids Turbo in which the protagonists, a group of guys who always look for trouble and create chaos in a small village, borrow some money from him. He is seen living in a villa, and in one scene he knocks out one of the guys for refusing to give him the money back. Aerts reprised the role in the 2012 sequel New Kids Nitro. In 2017, he played the role of Ludolf, henchman to Najib Amhali's villain, in the family film De Familie Slim.

Additionally, he has appeared on the Swedish martial arts television program Rallarsving in 2005, as well as the Dutch late-night talk shows Pauw & Witteman (two appearances, in 2008 and 2012) and Pauw in 2014.

Aerts filmed a Japanese television commercial for Cup Noodles with Andy Hug and Ernesto Hoost in the 1990s.

== Personal life ==
Aerts and his wife Esther have twin children, son Marciano and daughter Montana (born 2001), who are also kickboxers. He also has a stepdaughter, Serena, from his wife's previous relationship. Aerts lives near Enschede, where he runs a gym, Fight Institute Peter Aerts. He also owns an amateur kickboxing association in Japan, Peter Aerts Spirit.

In December 2023, Aerts announced that he has launched a new kickboxing organization, Legend, that is based in Japan.

== Championships and accomplishments ==
=== Kickboxing ===
- International Kick Boxing Federation
  - IKBF World Heavyweight (-106.5 kg/235 lb) Championship (one time)
    - Two successful title defences
- K-1
  - 1994 K-1 World Grand Prix Champion
  - 1995 K-1 World Grand Prix Champion
  - 1998 K-1 World Grand Prix Champion
  - 2001 K-1 World Grand Prix in Las Vegas runner-up
  - 2006 K-1 World Grand Prix runner-up
  - 2007 K-1 World Grand Prix runner-up
  - 2010 K-1 World Grand Prix runner-up
- Night of the Stars
  - 1994 Night of the Stars tournament champion
- World Muay Thai Association
  - WMTA World Heavyweight (-95 kg/209 lb) Championship (one time)
    - Three successful title defences
  - WMTA World Super Heavyweight (+95 kg/209 lb) Championship (one time)
    - One successful title defence

== Kickboxing record ==
Kickboxing record
108 wins (81 (T)KOs, 26 decisions), 35 losses, 2 draws
| Date | Result | Opponent | Event | Location | Method | Round | Time | Record |
| 2020-01-19 | Win | (Brazil) Jairo Kusunoki | HEAT 46 | Tokyo, Japan | KO (right low kick) | 2 | 0:28 | 108-35-2 |
| 2019-05-04 | Win | (Germany) Christian Müller | La Familia Fight Night X | Halle, Germany | KO (left knee) | 1 | 2:09 | 107-35-2 |
| 2018-07-26 | Loss | (Czech Republic) Jan Soukup | Yangames Fight Night 6 | Prague, Czech Republic | Decision (unanimous) | 3 | 3:00 | 106-35-2 |
| 2017-04-23 | Win | (France) Nordine Mahieddine | WFL 5: Champion vs. Champion | Almere, Netherlands | Decision (unanimous) | 3 | 3:00 | 106-34-2 |
| 2014-10-19 | Loss | (Netherlands) Ernesto Hoost | WKO: Kumite Energy | Osaka, Japan | Decision (unanimous) | 3 | 2:00 | 105-34-2 |
For the WKO World Heavyweight Championship.
| 2014-08-04 | Loss | (France) Freddy Kemayo | Fight Night Saint-Tropez II | Saint-Tropez, France | TKO (leg injury) | 2 | 1:56 | 105-33-2 |
| 2014-05-29 | Draw | (United States) Dewey Cooper | GFC Fight Series 1 | Dubai, UAE | Draw | 3 | 3:00 | 105-32-2 |
| 2013-12-21 | Loss | (Netherlands) Rico Verhoeven | Glory 13: Tokyo | Tokyo, Japan | Decision (split) | 3 | 3:00 | 105-32-1 |
| 2013-05-03 | Win | (Morocco) Jamal Ben Saddik | Glory 8: Tokyo | Tokyo, Japan | TKO (referee stoppage) | 2 | 0:48 | 105-31-1 |
| 2012-12-31 | Loss | (Tunisia) Mourad Bouzidi | Glory 4: Tokyo - Heavyweight Grand Slam Tournament, first round | Saitama, Japan | TKO (broken hand) | 1 | 2:00 | 104-31-1 |
| 2012-06-30 | Loss | (Suriname) Tyrone Spong | Music Hall & BFN Group present: It's Showtime 57 & 58 | Brussels, Belgium | TKO (referee stoppage) | 3 | 2:10 | 104-30-1 |
| 2011-12-11 | Win | (Japan) Mr. Kamikaze | Hinokuni Kakuto Densetsu Legend 2 | Kumamoto, Japan | TKO (referee stoppage) | 1 | 2:59 | 104-29-1 |
| 2010-12-11 | Loss | (Netherlands) Alistair Overeem | K-1 World Grand Prix 2010 Final, Final | Tokyo, Japan | TKO (punches) | 1 | 1:06 | 103-29-1 |
For 2010 K-1 World Grand Prix title.
| 2010-12-11 | Win | (Netherlands) Semmy Schilt | K-1 World Grand Prix 2010 Final, semis Finals | Tokyo, Japan | Decision (majority) | 3 | 3:00 | 103-28-1 |
| 2010-12-11 | Win | (United States) Mighty Mo | K-1 World Grand Prix 2010 Final, quarter-finals | Tokyo, Japan | KO (punches and kick) | 1 | 2:20 | 102-28-1 |
| 2010-10-02 | Win | (Brazil) Ewerton Teixeira | K-1 World Grand Prix 2010 in Seoul Final 16 | Seoul, South Korea | Extra round decision (unanimous) | 4 | 3:00 | 101-28-1 |
Qualifies for 2010 K-1 World Grand Prix.
| 2010-04-03 | Loss | (Japan) Kyotaro | K-1 World Grand Prix 2010 in Yokohama | Yokohama, Japan | KO (right hook) | 2 | 1:56 | 100-28-1 |
For K-1 Heavyweight (-100kg) Championship.
| 2009-12-05 | Win | (Turkey) Gökhan Saki | K-1 World Grand Prix 2009 Final | Yokohama, Japan | Decision (unanimous) | 3 | 3:00 | 100-27-1 |
| 2009-09-26 | Loss | (Netherlands) Alistair Overeem | K-1 World Grand Prix 2009 Final 16 | Seoul, South Korea | Decision (unanimous) | 3 | 3:00 | 99-27-1 |
Fails to qualify for 2009 K-1 World Grand Prix.
| 2009-08-11 | Win | (Japan) Yosuke Nishijima | K-1 World Grand Prix 2009 in Tokyo Final 16 Qualifying GP | Tokyo, Japan | KO (right low kick) | 3 | 1:24 | 99-26-1 |
| 2009-03-28 | Win | (Netherlands) Errol Zimmerman | K-1 World GP 2009 in Yokohama | Yokohama, Japan | Extra round decision (unanimous) | 4 | 3:00 | 98-26-1 |
| 2008-12-06 | Loss | (Morocco) Badr Hari | K-1 World GP 2008 Final, quarter-finals | Yokohama, Japan | TKO (referee stoppage) | 2 | 1:22 | 97-26-1 |
| 2008-09-27 | Win | (Netherlands) Semmy Schilt | K-1 World Grand Prix 2008 in Seoul Final 16 | Seoul, South Korea | Decision (majority) | 3 | 3:00 | 97-25-1 |
Qualifies for 2008 K-1 World Grand Prix.
| 2008-06-29 | Win | (South Africa) Jan Nortje | K-1 World GP 2008 in Fukuoka | Fukuoka, Japan | TKO (referee stoppage) | 3 | 2:49 | 96-25-1 |
| 2007-12-08 | Loss | (Netherlands) Semmy Schilt | K-1 World GP 2007 Final Final | Yokohama, Japan | TKO (knee injury) | 1 | 1:41 | 95-25-1 |
For 2007 K-1 World Grand Prix title.
| 2007-12-08 | Win | (Netherlands) Remy Bonjasky | K-1 World GP 2007 Final, semi-finals | Yokohama, Japan | Decision (unanimous) | 3 | 3:00 | 95-24-1 |
| 2007-12-08 | Win | (Japan) Junichi Sawayashiki | K-1 World GP 2007 Final, quarter-finals | Yokohama, Japan | KO (right cross) | 1 | 1:29 | 94-24-1 |
| 2007-09-29 | Win | (New Zealand) Ray Sefo | K-1 World GP 2007 in Seoul Final 16 | Seoul, South Korea | TKO (corner stoppage) | 1 | 3:00 | 93-24-1 |
Qualifies for 2007 K-1 World Grand Prix.
| 2007-08-05 | Win | (Denmark) Nicholas Pettas | K-1 World GP 2007 in Hong Kong | Hong Kong | KO (right high kick) | 2 | 2:34 | 92-24-1 |
| 2007-06-23 | Win | (United States) Bob Sapp | K-1 World GP 2007 in Amsterdam | Amsterdam, Netherlands | KO (left knee to the body) | 1 | 0:26 | 91-24-1 |
| 2006-12-02 | Loss | (Netherlands) Semmy Schilt | K-1 World Grand Prix 2006 Final | Tokyo, Japan | Decision (unanimous) | 3 | 3:00 | 90-24-1 |
For 2006 K-1 World Grand Prix title.
| 2006-12-02 | Win | (Brazil) Glaube Feitosa | K-1 World Grand Prix 2006, semi-finals | Tokyo, Japan | TKO (referee stoppage) | 2 | 1:02 | 90-23-1 |
| 2006-12-02 | Win | (Japan) Musashi | K-1 World Grand Prix 2006, quarter-finals | Tokyo, Japan | KO (punches) | 1 | 2:53 | 89-23-1 |
| 2006-07-30 | Win | (Trinidad and Tobago) Gary Goodridge | K-1 World Grand Prix 2006 in Sapporo | Sapporo, Japan | Decision (unanimous) | 3 | 3:00 | 88-23-1 |
| 2006-06-03 | Win | (Japan) Hiraku Hori | K-1 World Grand Prix 2006 in Seoul | Seoul, South Korea | KO (left high kick) | 2 | 1:23 | 87-23-1 |
| 2006-05-13 | Loss | (Netherlands) Ernesto Hoost | K-1 World Grand Prix 2006 in Amsterdam | Amsterdam, Netherlands | Decision (majority) | 3 | 3:00 | 86-23-1 |
| 2006-03-05 | Win | (Netherlands) Semmy Schilt | K-1 World Grand Prix 2006 in Auckland | Auckland, New Zealand | Decision (majority) | 3 | 3:00 | 86-22-1 |
| 2005-11-19 | Win | (France) Jérôme Le Banner | K-1 World Grand Prix 2005, quarter-finals | Tokyo, Japan | Extra round decision (unanimous) | 4 | 3:00 | 85-22-1 |
Despite winning fight, has to withdraw from tournament due to injury.
| 2005-09-23 | Win | (United States) Mighty Mo | K-1 World Grand Prix 2005 in Osaka - Final Elimination | Osaka, Japan | KO (left low kick) | 2 | 0:42 | 84-22-1 |
Qualifies for 2005 K-1 World Grand Prix.
| 2005-03-19 | Win | (United States) Carter Williams | K-1 World Grand Prix 2005 in Seoul | Seoul, South Korea | Extra round decision (unanimous) | 4 | 3:00 | 83-22-1 |
| 2004-12-04 | Loss | (South Africa) Francois Botha | K-1 World Grand Prix 2004, quarter-finals | Tokyo, Japan | TKO (leg injury) | 1 | 1:13 | 82-22-1 |
| 2004-09-25 | Win | (Canada) Michael McDonald | K-1 World Grand Prix 2004 Final Elimination | Tokyo, Japan | Decision (unanimous) | 3 | 3:00 | 82-21-1 |
Qualifies for 2004 K-1 World Grand Prix.
| 2004-06-06 | Win | (Trinidad and Tobago) Gary Goodridge | K-1 World Grand Prix 2004 in Nagoya | Nagoya, Japan | KO (low kicks) | 3 | 1:40 | 81-21-1 |
| 2003-12-06 | Loss | (Japan) Musashi | K-1 World Grand Prix 2003, semi-finals | Tokyo, Japan | Decision (majority) | 3 | 3:00 | 80-21-1 |
| 2003-12-06 | Win | (Belarus) Alexey Ignashov | K-1 World Grand Prix 2003, quarter-finals | Tokyo, Japan | Extra round decision (unanimous) | 4 | 3:00 | 80-20-1 |
| 2003-10-11 | Win | (Netherlands) Jerrel Venetiaan | K-1 World Grand Prix 2003 Final Elimination | Osaka, Japan | Decision (unanimous) | 3 | 3:00 | 79-20-1 |
Qualifies for 2003 K-1 World Grand Prix.
| 2003-06-29 | Win | (Japan) Tsuyoshi Nakasako | K-1 Beast II 2003 | Saitama, Japan | KO (high kick) | 2 | 1:32 | 78-20-1 |
| 2003-03-30 | Loss | (Germany) Stefan Leko | K-1 World Grand Prix 2003 in Saitama | Saitama, Japan | TKO (doctor stoppage) | 3 | 1:44 | 77-20-1 |
| 2002-12-07 | Loss | (New Zealand) Ray Sefo | K-1 World Grand Prix 2002, quarter-finals | Tokyo, Japan | Decision (split) | 3 | 3:00 | 77-19-1 |
| 2002-10-05 | Win | (Brazil) Glaube Feitosa | K-1 World Grand Prix 2002 Final Elimination | Saitama, Japan | Decision (unanimous) | 3 | 3:00 | 77-18-1 |
Qualifies for 2002 K-1 World Grand Prix.
| 2002-07-14 | Loss | (Belarus) Alexey Ignashov | K-1 World Grand Prix 2002 in Fukuoka | Fukuoka, Japan | Decision (majority) | 5 | 3:00 | 76-18-1 |
| 2002-06-02 | Win | (Russia) Andrei Kirsanov | K-1 Survival 2002 | Toyama, Japan | Decision (unanimous) | 5 | 3:00 | 76-17-1 |
| 2002-04-21 | Win | (Denmark) Nicholas Pettas | K-1 Burning 2002 | Hiroshima, Japan | KO (knee) | 1 | 2:50 | 75-17-1 |
| 2001-12-08 | Loss | (Brazil) Francisco Filho | K-1 World Grand Prix 2001, quarter-finals | Tokyo, Japan | TKO (corner stoppage) | 2 | 3:00 | 74-17-1 |
| 2001-08-11 | Loss | (Germany) Stefan Leko | K-1 World Grand Prix 2001 in Las Vegas, Final | Las Vegas, Nevada, USA | KO (right cross) | 3 | 2:05 | 74-16-1 |
For K-1 World Grand Prix 2001 in Las Vegas title.
| 2001-08-11 | Win | (United States) Maurice Smith | K-1 World Grand Prix 2001 in Las Vegas, semi-finals | Las Vegas, Nevada, USA | Extra round decision (unanimous) | 4 | 3:00 | 74-15-1 |
| 2001-08-11 | Win | (Japan) Noboru Uchida | K-1 World Grand Prix 2001 in Las Vegas, quarter-finals | Las Vegas, Nevada, USA | KO (left knee) | 3 | 2:06 | 73-15-1 |
| 2001-04-15 | Win | (Japan) Nobu Hayashi | K-1 Burning 2001 | Kumamoto, Japan | TKO (corner stoppage) | 5 | 0:36 | 72-15-1 |
| 2001-03-17 | Loss | (Croatia) Mirko Cro Cop | K-1 Gladiators 2001 | Yokohama, Japan | Decision (majority) | 5 | 3:00 | 71-15-1 |
| 2001-02-04 | Win | (United Kingdom) Stuart Green | K-1 Holland GP 2001 in Arnhem | Arnhem, Netherlands | KO (left knee) | 1 | 1:15 | 71-14-1 |
| 2000-12-10 | Win | (France) Cyril Abidi | K-1 World Grand Prix 2000, quarter-finals | Tokyo, Japan | Decision (unanimous) | 3 | 3:00 | 70-14-1 |
Despite winning fight, has to withdraw from tournament due to injury.
| 2000-08-20 | Loss | (France) Cyril Abidi | K-1 World Grand Prix 2000 in Yokohama, quarter-finals | Yokohama, Japan | TKO (corner stoppage) | 1 | 2:42 | 69-14-1 |
| 2000-07-07 | Loss | (France) Cyril Abidi | K-1 Spirits 2000 | Sendai, Japan | KO (right cross) | 1 | 2:13 | 69-13-1 |
| 2000-05-12 | Win | (South Africa) Andrew Thomson | K-1 King of the Ring 2000 | Bologna, Italy | KO | 1 | 0:55 | 69-12-1 |
| 2000-04-23 | Win | (New Zealand) Ray Sefo | K-1 The Millennium | Osaka, Japan | KO (right low kick) | 3 | 2:24 | 68-12-1 |
| 2000-01-25 | Win | (Japan) Musashi | K-1 Rising 2000 | Nagasaki, Japan | TKO (corner stoppage) | 4 | 1:25 | 67-12-1 |
| 1999-12-05 | Loss | (France) Jérôme Le Banner | K-1 World Grand Prix 1999, quarter-finals | Tokyo, Japan | KO (left hook) | 1 | 1:11 | 66-12-1 |
| 1999-10-05 | Win | (Netherlands) Lloyd van Dams | K-1 World Grand Prix '99 opening round | Osaka, Japan | Decision (unanimous) | 5 | 3:00 | 66-11-1 |
Qualifies for 1999 K-1 World Grand Prix.
| 1999-07-18 | Win | (Australia) Sam Greco | K-1 Dream '99 | Nagoya, Japan | KO (right high kick) | 2 | 1:38 | 65-11-1 |
| 1999-06-06 | Win | (United States) Maurice Smith | K-1 Survival '99 | Sapporo, Japan | TKO (corner stoppage) | 3 | 2:44 | 64-11-1 |
| 1999-04-25 | Win | (England) Matt Skelton | K-1 Revenge '99 | Yokohama, Japan | TKO (corner stoppage) | 4 | 3:00 | 63-11-1 |
| 1999-03-22 | Win | (United States) Jim Mullen | K-1 The Challenge '99 | Tokyo, Japan | KO (right high kick) | 3 | 1:26 | 62-11-1 |
| 1999-02-03 | Win | (Canada) Michael McDonald | K-1 Rising Sun '99 | Tokyo, Japan | KO (right hook) | 2 | 2:40 | 61-11-1 |
| 1998-12-13 | Win | (Switzerland) Andy Hug | K-1 World Grand Prix 1998, Final | Tokyo, Japan | KO (left high kick) | 1 | 1:10 | 60-11-1 |
Wins 1998 K-1 World Grand Prix.
| 1998-12-13 | Win | (South Africa) Mike Bernardo | K-1 World Grand Prix 1998, semi-finals | Tokyo, Japan | TKO (referee stoppage) | 1 | 2:53 | 59-11-1 |
| 1998-12-13 | Win | (Japan) Masaaki Satake | K-1 World Grand Prix 1998, quarter-finals | Tokyo, Japan | TKO (referee stoppage) | 1 | 2:40 | 58-11-1 |
| 1998-09-27 | Win | (Croatia) Sinisa Andrijasevic | K-1 World Grand Prix '98 opening round | Osaka, Japan | TKO (right knee) | 2 | 1:55 | 57-11-1 |
Qualifies for 1998 K-1 World Grand Prix.
| 1998-07-18 | Loss | (Brazil) Francisco Filho | K-1 Dream '98 | Nagoya, Japan | TKO (cut shin) | 1 | 3:00 | 56-11-1 |
| 1998-06-06 | Loss | (Switzerland) Andy Hug | K-1 Fight Night '98 | Zürich, Switzerland | Decision (unanimous) | 5 | 3:00 | 56-10-1 |
For the WKA World Super Heavyweight (+95 kg/209 lb) Muay Thai Championship.
| 1998-04-09 | Win | (Netherlands) Ernesto Hoost | K-1 Kings '98 | Yokohama, Japan | Decision (majority) | 5 | 3:00 | 56-9-1 |
| 1997-11-09 | Loss | (Switzerland) Andy Hug | K-1 World Grand Prix 1997, semi-finals | Tokyo, Japan | Decision (unanimous) | 3 | 3:00 | 55-9-1 |
| 1997-11-09 | Win | (South Africa) Mike Bernardo | K-1 World Grand Prix 1997, quarter-finals | Tokyo, Japan | KO (right straight to the body) | 3 | 1:17 | 55-8-1 |
| 1997-09-07 | Win | (United States) James Warring | K-1 Grand Prix '97 1st round | Osaka, Japan | KO (right high kick) | 3 | 1:13 | 54-8-1 |
Qualifies for 1997 K-1 World Grand Prix.
| 1997-07-20 | Win | (France) Jérôme Le Banner | K-1 Dream '97 | Nagoya, Japan | KO (right high kick) | 2 | 1:19 | 53-8-1 |
| 1997-04-29 | Win | (United States) Jean-Claude Leuyer | K-1 Braves '97 | Fukuoka, Japan | TKO (referee stoppage) | 2 | 2:08 | 52-8-1 |
| 1997-03-16 | Win | (Switzerland) Andy Hug | K-1 Kings '97 | Yokohama, Japan | TKO (referee stoppage) | 1 | 1:55 | 51-8-1 |
| 1997-02-15 | Win | (Germany) Andreas Sidon | The Battle in Best | Best, Netherlands | Decision (unanimous) | 5 | 3:00 | 50-8-1 |
Retains the WMTA World Super Heavyweight (+95 kg/209 lb) Championship.
| 1996-10-18 | Loss | (South Africa) Mike Bernardo | K-1 Star Wars '96 | Yokohama, Japan | KO (right hook) | 3 | 2:37 | 50-8-1 |
| 1996-09-01 | Loss | (South Africa) Mike Bernardo | K-1 Revenge '96 | Osaka, Japan | DQ (Bernardo kicked in groin) | 1 | 2:21 | 50-7-1 |
| 1996-05-06 | Loss | (South Africa) Mike Bernardo | K-1 World Grand Prix 1996, quarter-finals | Yokohama, Japan | KO (left hook) | 3 | 0:13 | 50-6-1 |
| 1996-03-10 | Win | (United States) Jean-Claude Leuyer | K-1 Grand Prix '96 Opening Battle | Yokohama, Japan | KO (right high kick) | 1 | 2:43 | 50-5-1 |
Qualifies for 1996 K-1 World Grand Prix.
| 1995-12-09 | Win | (South Africa) Mike Bernardo | K-1 Hercules | Nagoya, Japan | KO (right hook) | 1 | 0:40 | 49-5-1 |
| 1995-10-28 | Win | (Germany) Hubert Numrich | Shock of Europe | Amsterdam, Netherlands | Decision (unanimous) | 5 | 3:00 | 48-5-1 |
Wins the WMTA World Super Heavyweight (+95 kg/209 lb) Championship.
| 1995-09-03 | Win | (Australia) Sam Greco | K-1 Revenge II | Yokohama, Japan | Decision (unanimous) | 5 | 3:00 | 47-5-1 |
| 1995-07-16 | Win | (United Kingdom) Michael Thompson | K-3 Grand Prix '95 | Nagoya, Japan | KO (punches and knees) | 2 | 0:40 | 46-5-1 |
| 1995-05-04 | Win | (France) Jérôme Le Banner | K-1 World Grand Prix 1995, Final | Tokyo, Japan | KO (right straight to the body) | 1 | 1:37 | 45-5-1 |
Wins the 1995 K-1 World Grand Prix.
| 1995-05-04 | Win | (Netherlands) Ernesto Hoost | K-1 World Grand Prix 1995, semi-finals | Tokyo, Japan | Extra round decision (unanimous) | 4 | 3:00 | 44-5-1 |
| 1995-05-04 | Win | (Japan) Toshiyuki Atokawa | K-1 World Grand Prix 1995, quarter-finals | Tokyo, Japan | KO (right uppercut and left hook) | 1 | 1:02 | 43-5-1 |
| 1995-03-03 | Win | (United Kingdom) Kirkwood Walker | K-1 Grand Prix '95 Opening Battle | Tokyo, Japan | KO (right low kick) | 3 | 2:25 | 42-5-1 |
Qualifies for the 1995 K-1 World Grand Prix.
| 1994-12-10 | Win | (Australia) Glen Parker | K-1 Legend | Nagoya, Japan | KO (right knee) | 1 | 2:00 | 41-5-1 |
| 1994-11-12 | Win | (Turkey) Ergin Solmaz | The Night of The Sensation | Amsterdam, Netherlands | TKO (referee stoppage) | 3 | 1:03 | 40-5-1 |
Retains the WMTA World Heavyweight (-95 kg/209 lb) Championship.
| 1994-09-12 | Win | (Netherlands) Frank Lobman | Night of the Stars Tournament, Final | Rotterdam, Netherlands | TKO (corner stoppage) | 2 | 2:29 | 39-5-1 |
Wins the Night of the Stars Tournament championship.
| 1994-09-12 | Win | (Netherlands) Glenn Wijngaart | Night of the Stars Tournament, semi-finals | Rotterdam, Netherlands | KO (right cross) | 1 | 2:56 | 38-5-1 |
| 1994-09-12 | Win | (Netherlands) Rob van Esdonk | Night of the Stars Tournament, quarter-finals | Rotterdam, Netherlands | KO (right high kick) | 2 | | 37-5-1 |
| 1994-04-30 | Win | (Japan) Masaaki Satake | K-1 Grand Prix '94, Final | Tokyo, Japan | Decision (unanimous) | 3 | 3:00 | 36-5-1 |
Wins the 1994 K-1 World Grand Prix.
| 1994-04-30 | Win | (United States) Patrick Smith | K-1 Grand Prix '94, semi-finals | Tokyo, Japan | KO (right overhand) | 1 | 1:03 | 35-5-1 |
| 1994-04-30 | Win | (Netherlands) Rob van Esdonk | K-1 Grand Prix '94, quarter-finals | Tokyo, Japan | KO (right high kick) | 3 | 1:10 | 34-5-1 |
| 1994-02-20 | Win | (Germany) Markus Fuckner | The Night of The Thriller | Amsterdam, Netherlands | KO (right cross) | 2 | 2:21 | 33-5-1 |
Retains the WMTA World Heavyweight (-95 kg/209 lb) Championship.
| 1993-09-19 | Win | (Netherlands) Rob van Esdonk | The Night of the Gladiators | Amsterdam, Netherlands | KO (right hook) | 4 | 0:56 | |
Retains the WMTA World Heavyweight (-95 kg/209 lb) Championship.
| 1993-09-04 | Win | (United States) Dino Homsey | K-1 Illusion | Tokyo, Japan | KO (left high kick) | 1 | 1:36 | |
| 1993-04-30 | Loss | (Netherlands) Ernesto Hoost | K-1 Grand Prix '93, quarter-finals | Tokyo, Japan | Decision (majority) | 3 | 3:00 | |
| 1993-03-07 | Win | (United States) Maurice Smith | The Night of the Shock | Amsterdam, Netherlands | KO (right high kick) | 4 | 2:07 | |
| 1993-01-29 | Win | (United Kingdom) Peter Selkthorpe | The Best of Best | Best, Netherlands | KO (knees) | 1 | 1:14 | |
Wins the European Muay Thai Championship.
| 1992-10-04 | Draw | (Japan) Masaaki Satake | Kakutougi Olympics III, Karate World Cup '92 | Osaka, Japan | Decision draw | | | |
| 1992-09-20 | Win | (Netherlands) Frank Lobman | The Night of The Truth | Rotterdam, Netherlands | TKO (referee stoppage) | 3 | 1:31 | |
Wins the MTBN World Heavyweight (-91 kg/200 lb) Championship.
Retains the IKBF World Heavyweight (-106.5 kg/235 lb) Championship.
| 1992-05-16 | Win | (Australia) Adam Watt | Rings: Mega Battle 4th | Tokyo, Japan | KO | 2 | 2:46 | |
| 1992-04-09 | Win | (United States) Maurice Smith | | Paris, France | Decision | 9 | 2:00 | |
| 1992-03-22 | Win | (Germany) Darius Alibek | Fight of the Heavy Tanks | Amsterdam, Netherlands | TKO (referee stoppage) | 2 | 2:05 | |
| 1991-11-18 | Win | (Netherlands) Frank Lobman | Night of Fights | Rotterdam, Netherlands | Decision (unanimous) | 5 | 3:00 | |
Wins the WMTA World Heavyweight (-95 kg/209 lb) Championship.
| 1991-09-22 | Win | (Morocco) Hassan Kassrioui | | Amsterdam, Netherlands | KO | 3 | | |
| 1991-06-29 | Win | (United Kingdom) Mark Russell | Oranjestad Fight Night 1991 | Oranjestad, Aruba | TKO (referee stoppage) | 1 | 1:40 | |
| 1990-11-18 | Loss | (Netherlands) Jan Wessels | The Battle of the Year | Amsterdam, Netherlands | KO (hook) | 3 | | |
| 1990-04-01 | Win | (Netherlands) Jan Oosterbaan | Holland vs. England | Amsterdam, Netherlands | TKO (corner stoppage) | 2 | 3:00 | |
Retains the IKBF World Heavyweight (-106.5 kg/235 lb) Muay Thai Championship.
| 1989-12-16 | Win | (Germany) Till Görres | Thai-Kickboxing Gala | Düsseldorf, Germany | TKO (doctor stoppage) | 1 | 0:38 | |
| 1989 | Loss | (Netherlands) Andre Mannaart | | Netherlands | KO | | | |
| 1988-11-20 | Loss | (Netherlands) Ernesto Hoost | | Netherlands | Decision | 5 | 3:00 | |
| 1987-10-18 | Win | (Netherlands) | | Almelo, Netherlands | KO | 2 | | 4-0 |
| 1987-05-24 | Win | (Netherlands) Yacobi | | Dordrecht, Netherlands | TKO | 2 | | 3-0 |
| 1987-03-29 | Win | (Netherlands) Nico Krijgsman | | Utrecht, Netherlands | Decision | 2 | 2:00 | 2-0 |
Legend: Win Loss Draw/No contest Notes

== Mixed martial arts record ==
Professional record breakdown
| 3 matches | 1 win | 2 losses |
| By knockout | 1 | 0 |
| By submission | 0 | 1 |
| By decision | 0 | 1 |

| Res. | Record | Opponent | Method | Event | Date | Round | Time | Location | Notes |
|---|---|---|---|---|---|---|---|---|---|
| Loss | 1–2 | Baruto Kaito | Decision (unanimous) | Rizin Fighting Federation 2 | December 31, 2015 | 3 | 3:00 | Saitama, Japan | |
| Loss | 1–1 | Shungo Oyama | Submission (heel hook) | K-1 PREMIUM 2005 Dynamite!! | December 31, 2005 | 1 | 0:30 | Osaka, Japan | |
| Win | 1–0 | Wakashoyo Shunichi | TKO (punches) | Hero's 2 | July 6, 2005 | 1 | 1:36 | Tokyo, Japan | |

== Filmography ==
Film
| Year | Title | Role | Notes |
|---|---|---|---|
| 2010 | New Kids Turbo | Himself | |
| 2011 | New Kids Nitro | Himself | |
| 2017 | De Familie Slim | Ludolf | |

Television
| Year | Title | Role | Notes |
|---|---|---|---|
| 2005 | Rallarsving | Himself | Episode 1 |
| 2008, 2012 | Pauw & Witteman | Himself | 2 episodes |
| 2012 | Uncle Frank | Bodyguard | Television film |
| 2014 | Pauw | Himself | 3 episodes |

== See also ==
- List of K-1 champions
- List of male kickboxers
