= K-1 World Grand Prix 2009 in Seoul Final 16 =

K-1 martial arts event

K-1 World Grand Prix 2009 Final 16
- The poster for K-1 World Grand Prix 2009 Final 16
- Promotion: K-1
- Date: September 26, 2009
- Venue: Olympic Gymnastics Arena
- City: (South Korea) Seoul, Republic of Korea
- Attendance: 15,417

Event chronology
K-1 ColliZion 2009 Romania Qualification Round	K-1 World Grand Prix 2009 Final 16	K-1 ColliZion 2009 Final Elimination

K-1 World Grand Prix 2009 in Seoul Final 16 was a martial arts event held by the K-1 on Saturday, September 26, 2009, at the Olympic Gymnastics Arena in Seoul, Korea. It was the Final Elimination tournament for top sixteen fighters. The winners qualified for the K-1 World Grand Prix 2009 Final held on December 5, 2009, at Yokohama Arena, Japan.

The eight finalists from K-1 World Grand Prix 2008 Final were automatically qualified, except Gokhan Saki who could not compete due to an injury, the eighth spot was filled by K-1 Super-heavyweight champion, Semmy Schilt, then four World GP 2009 tournament winners from the Yokohama, Lodz, Seoul and Final 16 Qualifying GP. The last four spots were selected by fan voting.

== Results ==
K-1 World GP 2009 Final 16 Elimination results
Opening bouts: K-1 rules / 3Min. 3R
(South Korea) Hyun Man Myung def. Taisei Ko (Japan)
Myung defeated Ko by three round unanimous decision 3-0 (30-28, 30-27, 30-27).
(South Korea) Min Ho Song def. Nae Chul Kim (South Korea)
Song defeated Kim by TKO (Doc. stop/cut) at 2:09 of the second round.
Women's Special bout: K-1 rules / 2Min. 3R Ext.1R/53 kg
(South Korea) Su Jeong Lim def. Chen Qing (China)
Lim defeated Qing by three round unanimous decision 3-0 (30-29, 30-29, 30-28).
Special bout: K-1 rules / 3Min. 3R Ext.1R
(South Korea) Chi Bin Lim def. Tahir Menxhiqi (Albania)
Lim defeated Menxhiqi by three round unanimous decision 3-0 (30-28, 30-28, 30-28).
Superfight: K-1 rules / 3Min. 3R Ext.1R
(Japan) Taiei Kin def. Cătălin Moroșanu (Romania)
Kin defeated Morosano by Disqualification (KO after the bell) at 0:00 of the second round.
K-1 World GP 2009 Final 16 Elimination bouts: K-1 rules / 3Min. 3R Ext. 2R
(Netherlands) Remy Bonjasky def Melvin Manhoef (Netherlands)
Bonjasky defeated Manhoef by three round unanimous decision 3-0 (30-29, 30-29, 30-29).
(Netherlands) Errol Zimmerman def Glaube Feitosa (Brazil)
Zimmerman defeated Feitosa by three round majority decision 2-0 (29-28, 29-28, 30-30).
(Russia) Ruslan Karaev def Kyotaro (Japan)
Karaev defeated Kyotaro by three round unanimous decision 3-0 (30-28, 30-29, 30-28).
(Brazil) Ewerton Teixeira vs Singh Jaideep (India)
Teixeira defeated Jaideep by second extra round unanimous decision 3-0 (10-9, 10-9, 10-9). After three rounds, judges scored it a majority draw (29-29, 30-30, 29-30). First extra round was scored a unanimous draw 0-0 (10-10, 10-10, 10-10).
(Netherlands) Semmy Schilt vs Daniel Ghita (Romania)
Schilt defeated Ghita by three round unanimous decision 3-0 (30-25, 30-26, 30-27).
(France) Jerome Le Banner vs Musashi (Japan)
Le Banner defeated Musashi by three round unanimous decision 3-0 (30-28, 30-28, 30-28).
(Netherlands) Alistair Overeem def Peter Aerts (Netherlands)
Overeem defeated Aerts by three round unanimous decision 3-0 (30-27, 30-27, 30-27).
(Morocco) Badr Hari def. Zabit Samedov (Belarus)
Hari defeated Samedov by KO (right body shot) at 2:35 of the first round.

== See also ==
- List of K-1 events
- List of K-1 champions
- List of male kickboxers
