= Hiraku Hori =

Japanese kickboxer

- Born: April 3, 1982 (age 44); Sendai, Japan
- Native name: 堀啓
- Nationality: (Japan) Japanese
- Height: 1.98 m (6 ft 6 in)
- Weight: 103 kg (227 lb; 16.2 st)
- Division: Heavyweight
- Team: Team Dragon
- Years active: 2001-2010

Kickboxing record
- Total: 27
- Wins: 13
- By knockout: 7
- Losses: 14
- By knockout: 10
- Last updated on: April 4, 2011

Hiraku Hori (Japanese: 堀啓; born April 3, 1982) is a retired Japanese heavyweight kickboxer. A professional from 2001 until 2010, he competed almost exclusively in K-1.

== Career ==
Hori made his professional debut at K-1 Survival 2001, winning via third-round knockout. After winning four of his next five, he faced MMA fighter Kazuhiro Nakamura at K-1 Beast 2003. After a competitive first round, Hori used his large reach advantage to attack Nakamura with a series of left roundhouse kicks, then knocked him out with a high kick.

Hori was then pitted against fellow Japanese prospect Tatsufumi Tomihara in the quarterfinals of the K-1 Survival 2003 Japan Grand Prix. He won via decision, and moved on to face Musashi, the premiere heavyweight Japanese star at the time. Hori lost via TKO due to a low kick.

With a 6-2 professional record, Hori was then matched up with Samoan Mighty Mo at K-1 Burning 2004. The bout was Mo's K-1 debut, and after the judges declared the fight would go to the overtime fourth round, he defeated Hori with a knockout. Hori then fought Cyril Abidi in a valiant effort, losing via TKO with just two seconds left in the fight.

Hori then fought in the K-1 Beast 2004 tournament on June 26, 2004. After winning the quarterfinal match, Hori fought Nobu Hayashi, a 24-fight veteran at the time. Hori lost in the third round via knockout.

In the quarterfinals of the K-1 World Grand Prix 2005 in Hiroshima, Hori fought Tsuyoshi Nakasako. Hori won via decision.

== Kickboxing record ==
Kickboxing record
13 wins (7 KOs, 6 decisions), 14 losses
Date	Result	Opponent	Event	Location	Method	Round	Time	Record
2010-12-16	Loss	(Russia) Eugene Orlov	KOK World GP 2010 in Russia	Moscow, Russia	Decision (3-0)	3	3:00	13-14
2010-04-29	Win	(Japan) Hukuda Yuuhei	Krush 9	Japan	TKO (corner stoppage)	3	2:07	13-13
2009-03-21	Win	(Japan) Tanigawa Takeshi	Krush 6	Japan	KO (punches)	2	1:09	12-13
2009-03-28	Loss	(Japan) Takumi Sato	K-1 World Grand Prix 2009 in Yokohama	Yokohama, Japan	TKO	3	1:19	11-13
2007-10-13	Loss	(Ukraine) Maxsim Neledva	K-1 Fighting Network Latvia 2007	Yokohama, Japan	KO			11-12
2007-03-04	Loss	(Russia) Aleksandr Pitchkounov	K-1 World Grand Prix 2007 in Yokohama	Yokohama, Japan	KO	1	2:27	11-11
2006-12-02	Win	(South Korea) Kyoung Suk Kim	K-1 World Grand Prix 2006 in Tokyo Final	Tokyo, Japan	Decision (3-0)	3	3:00	11-10
2006-06-03	Loss	(Netherlands) Peter Aerts	K-1 World Grand Prix 2006 in Seoul	Seoul, South Korea	KO (left high kick)	2	1:23	10-10
2006-05-03	Loss	(Samoa) Jason Suttie	K-1 World Grand Prix 2006 in Auckland	Auckland, New Zealand	KO	3	1:34	10-9
2006-05-03	Win	(France) Cyril Abidi	K-1 World Grand Prix 2006 in Auckland	Auckland, New Zealand	TKO (corner stoppage)	2	3:00	10-8
2005-08-13	Loss	(Morocco) Chalid Arrab	K-1 World Grand Prix 2005 in Las Vegas II	Las Vegas, United States	Decision (3-0)	3	3:00	9-8
2004-06-14	Loss	(United States) Bob Sapp	K-1 World Grand Prix 2005 in Hiroshima	Hiroshima, Japan	KO	2	1:54	9-7
2005-06-14	Win	(Japan) Tsuyoshi Nakasako	K-1 World Grand Prix 2005 in Hiroshima	Hiroshima, Japan	Decision (3-0)	3	3:00	9-6
2005-03-19	Loss	(Thailand) Kaoklai Kaennorsing	K-1 World Grand Prix 2005 in Seoul	Seoul, South Korea	Decision (3-0)	3	3:00	8-6
2005-03-19	Win	(South Korea) Myeon Ju Lee	K-1 World Grand Prix 2005 in Seoul	Seoul, South Korea	Decision (3-0)	3	3:00	8-5
2004-06-26	Loss	(Japan) Nobu Hayashi	K-1 Beast 2004	Shizuoka, Japan	KO	3	2:31	7-5
2004-06-26	Win	(Japan) Shingo Koyasu	K-1 Beast 2004	Shizuoka, Japan	Decision (3-0)	3	3:00	7-4
2004-03-27	Loss	(France) Cyril Abidi	K-1 World Grand Prix 2004 in Saitama	Saitama, Japan	TKO	3	2:58	6-4
2004-02-15	Loss	(American Samoa) Mighty Mo	K-1 Burning 2004	Okinawa, Japan	KO (right hook)	Ex R 4	1:22	6-3
2003-09-21	Loss	(Japan) Musashi	K-1 Survival 2003 Japan Grand Prix	Yokohama, Japan	KO (left kow kick)	2	3:00	6-2
2003-09-21	Win	(Japan) Tatsufumi Tomihira	K-1 Survival 2003 Japan Grand Prix	Yokohama, Japan	Decision (2-0)	3	3:00	6-1
2003-06-29	Win	(Japan) Kazuhiro Nakamura	K-1 Beast II 2003	Yokohama, Japan	K0 (left high kick)	2	1:58	5-1
2003-04-06	Win	(Japan) Kazushi Nishida	K-1 Beast 2003	Yamagata, Japan	KO (left knee)	2	1:11	4-1
2002-04-21	Loss	(Japan) Ryo Takigawa	K-1 Burning 2002	Hiroshima, Japan	KO (right hook)	2	1:02	3-1
2001-08-19	Win	(Japan) Masahide Aoyagi	K-1 Andy Memorial Japan GP Final	Saitama, Japan	Decision (3-0)	2	0:39	3-0
2001-06-24	Win	(Japan) Mitsuru Suzuki	K-1 Survival 2001	Tokyo, Japan	KO (left low kick)	2	0:39	2-0
2001-04-15	Win	(Japan) Ryoma	K-1 Burning 2001	Kumamoto, Japan	KO (knee)	3	1:17	1-0
Legend: Win Loss Draw/no contest Notes

== See also ==
- List of male kickboxers
- List of K-1 events
