= Frank Lobman =

Dutch kickboxer (1953–2021)

- Born: 18 November 1953; Paramaribo, Suriname
- Died: 10 June 2021 (aged 67); Rotterdam, Netherlands
- Other names: The Animal
- Height: 1.80 m (5 ft 11 in)
- Weight: 90 kg (200 lb; 14 st)
- Division: Heavyweight
- Style: Kickboxing, Muay Thai
- Fighting out of: Rotterdam, Netherlands
- Years active: 27 (1975–2002)

Kickboxing record
- Total: 116
- Wins: 110
- By knockout: 100
- Losses: 6
- Draws: 0

Mixed martial arts record
- Total: 1
- Wins: 1
- By knockout: 1
- Losses: 0
- By submission: 0

Other information
- Mixed martial arts record from Sherdog
- Last updated on: 12 February 2010

Frank "The Animal" Lobman (18 November 1953 – 10 June 2021) was a Dutch kickboxer. He was a five-time European kickboxing champion and had an astonishing 90% knockout ratio. He beat many notable fighters over his career, such as Bas Rutten, Ken Shamrock, and British heavyweight kickboxing champion Steve Taberner. He fought in organizations such as Pancrase, P.K.A., W.K.A., and K-1.

== Biography ==
Lobman was a prominent kickboxer in the 1980s to the early 1990s. He trained often in Crooswijk, Rotterdam where his brother Hedwig Lobman taught Kyokushin karate. Several kickboxing matches were given in the early 1980s with Lucien Carbin. In 1991 he beat Bas Rutten for a European kickboxing title. Lobman was undefeated until his first fight with Peter Aerts.

He announced his retirement fight in 2002 at the age of 49. His last fight was a 20-year rematch with Jan Oosterbaan in Ahoy-2H2H, but he lost the fight due to a decision.

== Titles ==
- 5 time European Kick Boxing champion
- I.K.B.F. European Heavyweight champion
- E.M.T.A. European Heavyweight champion
- Dutch Heavyweight champion

== Kickboxing record ==
Kickboxing record
110 Wins (100 (T)KO's), 6 Losses
Date	Result	Opponent	Event	Location	Method	Round	Time	Record
2003-03-16	Loss	(Netherlands) Jan Oosterbaan	2 Hot 2 Handle	Rotterdam, Netherlands	TKO	4		
1994-11-12	Win	(Netherlands) Andre Mannaart	Night of the Superstars	Amsterdam, Netherlands	KO	4		
1994-09-20	Loss	(Netherlands) Peter Aerts	The Night of the Stars Tournament, final	Rotterdam, Netherlands	TKO (corner stoppage)	2	2:21	
1994-09-20	Win	(Netherlands) Peter Verschuren	The Night of the Stars Tournament, semi final	Rotterdam, Netherlands	Decision	3	3:00	
1994-09-20	Win	(Netherlands) Dennis Krauweel	The Night of the Stars Tournament, quarter final	Rotterdam, Netherlands	TKO (leg injury)	1		
1994-07-30	Loss	(United States) Maurice Smith	AJKF Destiny VII	Nagoya, Japan	KO (Left high kick)	3		
1994-05-31	Win	(United States) Ken Shamrock	Pancrase: Road to the Championship 1	Tokyo, Japan	TKO (leg kicks)	2		
1994-05-15	Win	(Netherlands) William van Roosmalen	Fight of the Heavy Tanks	Amsterdam, Netherlands	KO (uppercut)	4		
1994-02-20	Loss	(Netherlands) Luc Verheye	The Night Of The Thriller 1994	Amsterdam, Netherlands	TKO (Towell)	5	0:55	
1993-11-27	Win	(Japan) Rikioh	EVOLUTION step8	Tokyo, Japan	KO	2		
1993-06-06	Win	(Netherlands) Rene Rooze	The War	Rotterdam, Netherlands	KO	3		
1993-00-00	Win	(England) Mark Russell	The Best of the Best	Eindhoven, Netherlands	SD	5		
1992-09-20	Loss	(Netherlands) Peter Aerts	The Night of The Truth	Rotterdam, Netherlands	TKO (referee stoppage)	3	1:31	
1991-11-18	Loss	(Netherlands) Peter Aerts	Night of Fights	Rotterdam, Netherlands	Decision (Unanimous)	5	3:00	
1991-02-12	Win	(Netherlands) Bas Rutten		Rotterdam, Netherlands	KO	1		
199X-00-00	Win	(France) Jean Atonga		Rotterdam, Netherlands	KO			
1984-00-00	Win	(Netherlands) Jan Oosterbaan		Rotterdam, Netherlands	Decision			
1981-11-29	Win	(England) Steve Taberner		Netherlands	Decision			
Legend: Win Loss Draw/No contest Notes
