= K-1 World Grand Prix 2006 in Tokyo Final =

Kickboxing event

- The poster for K-1 World Grand Prix 2006 in Tokyo Final
- Promotion: K-1
- Date: December 2, 2006
- Venue: Tokyo Dome
- City: Tokyo, Japan
- Attendance: 54,800

Event chronology
| K-1 World MAX North European Qualification 2007 | K-1 World Grand Prix 2006 in Tokyo Final | K-1 Fighting Network Prague Round '07 |

K-1 World Grand Prix 2006 in Tokyo Final was a kickboxing promoted by the K-1 ortheminutes each, with a possible tiebreaker.

The tournament qualifiers had all qualified via elimination fights at the K-1 World Grand Prix 2006 in Osaka opening round. Losing fighters Musashi and Ray Sefo were invited as reserve fighters while Badr Hari and Paul Slowinski would face one another in a 'Super Fight'. Peter Aerts and Melvin Manhoef were also invited to the event as reservists. As well as tournament bouts there were also a number of 'Opening Fights' primarily involving local fighters, fought under K-1 Rules. In total there were eighteen fighters at the event, representing ten countries.

The tournament winner was Semmy Schilt who won his second consecutive K-1 World Grand Prix by defeating Peter Aerts (who was making his fourth appearance in the final) via third round unanimous decision. The victory was sweet revenge for Schilt who had lost to Aerts earlier on in the year at the K-1 World Grand Prix 2006 in Auckland. The event was also notable for being Ernesto Hoost's last K-1 tournament and last fight - after a career spanning twenty-three years featuring numerous titles including four K-1 World Grand Prix victories. Hoost managed to make the semi-finals where he was defeated via third round unanimous decision by the eventual winner Schilt. The event was held at the Tokyo Dome in Tokyo, Japan on Saturday, December 2, 2006 in front of 54,800 spectators.

== K-1 World Grand Prix 2006 Tournament ==
final elimination
(Netherlands) Semmy Schilt | KO
(Switzerland) Bjorn Bregy
(France) Jérôme Le Banner | DEC
(South Korea) Hong-man Choi
(Netherlands) Ernesto Hoost | KO
(Japan) Yusuke Fujimoto
(Japan) Musashi
(Germany) Chalid Arrab | DEC
(Brazil) Glaube Feitosa
(Poland) Paul Slowinski | DEC
(Russia) Ruslan Karaev | KO
(Morocco) Badr Hari
(Netherlands) Remy Bonjasky | KO
(Trinidad and Tobago) Gary Goodridge
(New Zealand) Ray Sefo
(Germany) Stefan Leko | DEC

Quarter-finals
(Netherlands) Semmy Schilt | DEC
(France) Jérôme Le Banner
(Netherlands) Ernesto Hoost | DEC
(Germany) Chalid Arrab
(Brazil) Glaube Feitosa | KO
(Russia) Ruslan Karaev
(Netherlands) Remy Bonjasky | DEC
(Germany) Stefan Leko

Semi-finals
(Netherlands) Semmy Schilt | DEC
(Netherlands) Ernesto Hoost
(Brazil) Glaube Feitosa
(Netherlands) Peter Aerts * | TKO

Final
(Netherlands) Semmy Schilt | DEC
(Netherlands) Peter Aerts

* Remy Bonjasky was unable to continue due to injury - his place in the semi-finals was taken by Reserve Fight winner Peter Aerts.

== Results ==
Opening Fights: K-1 Rules / 3Min. 3R Ext.1R

Takumi Sato (Japan) vs Tsutomu Takahagi (Japan)
Sato defeated Takahagi by KO at 2:47 of the 2nd round.

Mitsugu Noda (Japan) vs Junichi Sawayashiki (Japan)
Sawayashiki defeated Noda by 3rd round Split Decision 2-1 (28-29, 30-29, 30-28).

Hiraku Hori (Japan) vs Kyoung-suk Kim (South Korea)
Hori defeated Kim by 3rd round Unanimous Decision 3-0 (29-28, 29-28, 29-28).

Reserve Fight #1: K-1 Rules / 3Min. 3R Ext.1R

Peter Aerts (Netherlands) vs Musashi (Japan)
Aerts defeated Musashi by KO (punches) at 2:53 of the 1st round.

Quarter-finals: K-1 Rules / 3Min. 3R Ext.1R

Jérôme Le Banner (France) vs Semmy Schilt (Netherlands)
Schilt defeated Le Banner by 3rd round Unanimous Decision 3-0 (30-27, 30-28, 30-28).

Chalid Arrab (Germany) vs Ernesto Hoost (Netherlands)
Hoost defeated Arrab by Extra Round Unanimous Decision 3-0 (10-9, 10-9, 10-9). After 3 rounds the judges had scored it a Majority Draw 1-0 (30-30, 30-28, 30-30) in favour of Hoost.

Glaube Feitosa (Brazil) vs Ruslan Karaev (Russia)
Feitosa defeated Karaev by KO (Brazilian High Kick) at 1:11 of the 1st round.

Remy Bonjasky (Netherlands) vs Stefan Leko (Germany)
Bonjasky defeated Leko by 3rd round Unanimous Decision 3-0 (30-28, 30-28, 30-28). After suffering two kicks to the groin, Bonjasky was not able to recover in the time allowed. K-1 officials decided to postpone the bout until later in the evening, giving Bonjasky time to recompose. The bout was completed after the first Superfight of the card.

Reserve Fight #2: K-1 Rules / 3Min. 3R Ext.1R

Melvin Manhoef (Netherlands) vs Ray Sefo (New Zealand)
Sefo defeated Manhoef by KO (right hook) at 0:40 of the 1st round.

Semi-finals: K-1 Rules / 3Min. 3R Ext.1R

Semmy Schilt (Netherlands) vs Ernesto Hoost (Netherlands)
Schilt defeated Hoost by 3rd round Unanimous Decision 3-0 (30-28, 30-27, 30-27).

Glaube Feitosa (Brazil) vs Peter Aerts (Netherlands)
Aerts defeated Feitosa by TKO (Referee Stoppage) at 1:02 of the 2nd round. Due to a groin injury Remy Bonjasky was forced to withdraw from the tournament and was replaced by the first reserve fight winner, Peter Aerts.

Super Fight: K-1 Rules / 3Min. 3R Ext.1R

Badr Hari (Morocco) vs Paul Slowinski (Poland)
Hari defeated Slowinski by 3rd round Unanimous Decision 3-0 (30-27, 30-27, 30-29).

Final: K-1 Rules / 3Min. 3R Ext.2R

Semmy Schilt (Netherlands) vs Peter Aerts (Netherlands)
Schilt defeated Aerts by 3rd round Unanimous Decision 3-0 (30-27, 30-27, 30-28).

== See also ==
- List of K-1 events
- List of male kickboxers
