= Cyril Abidi =

French kickboxer (born 1976)

- Born: February 25, 1976 (age 50); Marseille, France
- Other names: The Marseille Bad Boy
- Height: 1.90 m (6 ft 3 in)
- Weight: 104.7 kg (231 lb; 16.49 st)
- Division: Heavyweight
- Style: Kickboxing
- Team: Brizon Gym
- Years active: 1998–2007

Kickboxing record
- Total: 41
- Wins: 25
- By knockout: 17
- Losses: 16
- By knockout: 10

Mixed martial arts record
- Total: 2
- Wins: 0
- Losses: 2
- By submission: 2

Other information
- Website: http://www.Cyrilabidi.com
- Mixed martial arts record from Sherdog

Cyril Abidi (born February 25, 1976), nicknamed "The Marseille Bad Boy", is a French former heavyweight kickboxer and mixed martial artist. A professional competitor from 1998 until 2007, he is perhaps best remembered for his upset first-round knockout win over Peter Aerts, which he followed up with another win in the rematch a month later. Abidi also defeated K-1 standouts Ray Sefo and Petar Majstorovic.

== Background ==
Abidi grew up in the north quartiers of Marseille (Consolat), in a modest Tunisian family. When he was 6, his mother took him to judo classes to keep him off the streets. He practiced judo for four years until he was inspired by Bruce Lee, his childhood idol, and started taking karate lessons.

When he was 18, he discovered Thaiboxing and became French champion at the age of 20.

== Career ==
A year later, he entered K-1, fighting against Petar Majstorovic in Zurich, Switzerland, and winning by a unanimous decision. Later that year, he faced Dutch fighter Peter Aerts on July 7. A heavy underdog, Abidi knocked out Aerts with a right cross at 2:13 of the first round. A month later, the two squared off again at the 2000 Heavyweight Grand Prix in Yokohama, with Abidi winning again in the first round after Aerts' corner threw in the towel. After causing another upset with a win over Ray Sefo later that night, Abidi faced Francisco Filho for the heavyweight final. Abidi lost after his corner threw in the towel in the second round. Later on December 10 of that same year, Abidi and Aerts faced off for a third time at the 2000 Japan World Grand Prix, with Aerts this time winning via unanimous decision. Later that night, Abidi fought in a rematch with Ray Sefo, their last bout being the semifinal of the Yokohama Grand Prix. Sefo avenged his defeat via first-round TKO.

After starting off 2001 with a decision win, Abidi was upset by South African Andrew Thomson, losing via TKO just 1:15 into the first round. He fought just once more in 2001, winning via fourth-round TKO. After a KO win in May 2002, it was announced Abidi would face then PRIDE Middleweight contender and future UFC Light Heavyweight Champion, Quinton Jackson. Some pundits did not expect Jackson's wild brawling style to be adaptable to K-1 competition against a well-rounded striker such as Abidi. However, Abidi lost via upset after being knocked out just under two minutes into the first round. After losing to Bob Sapp in another first-round defeat, Abidi faced Jackson in a rematch at the Inoki Bom-Ba-Ye event in 2002. Abidi lost again, this time via decision after three rounds.

In his short foray into mixed martial arts, Abidi lost to Nigerian comedian Bobby Ologun in his first fight in MMA. Abidi was a last minute replacement for Mike Bernardo who was injured. The events surrounding the outcome raised suspicion of a fixed fight and Abidi seemed to lend credence to this in a post match interview.

I didn't have enough time to prepare for this fight, but I think I did do a good job for my first time. It was really good that my opponent is not so strong…..If he was a really strong fighter, I would have had had a hell of a time. Why I am smiling a lot? Even though I lost this fight, I don't have any feelings that I really lost a realistic fight. Maybe this was as expected.

His fight against fellow Frenchman and rival Jérôme Le Banner at K-1 World Grand Prix 2005 in Paris, on May 27, 2005, is considered to be one of the greatest battles in K-1 history. Abidi lost by a technical knockout. After losing the fight, Abidi stirred controversy by throwing three strikes at Le Banner, who deflected them but both fighters would have to be restrained by their corners and the officials ringside.

== Titles ==
- 2003 K-1 World GP 3rd place
- 2003 K-1 World Grand Prix in Paris runner up
- 2000 K-1 World GP 2nd place
- 2000 K-1 World GP in Yokohama runner up
- 2000 Thai Boxing World champion
- 2000 French Heavyweight Amateur Boxing champion
- 1996 French Kickboxing champion

== Kickboxing record ==
25 Wins (17 (T)KOs, 8 Decisions), 16 losses (10 (T)KOs, 7 Decisions)
Date	Result	Opponent	Event	Method	Round	Time
April 3, 2007	Loss	(Japan) Mitsugu Noda	K-1 World GP 2007 in Yokohama	Decision	3	3:00
March 5, 2006	Loss	(Japan) Hiraku Hori	K-1 World Grand Prix 2006 in Auckland, New Zealand	TKO (Corner Stoppage)	2	3:00
October 15, 2005	Win	(France) Stephane Reveillon	TK2 World MAX 4ever Edition, Paris	KO (Punch)	1	0:11
May 27, 2005	Loss	(France) Jérôme Le Banner	K-1 World Grand Prix 2005 in Paris, France	TKO (Referee stoppage)	5	2:53
December 4, 2004	Loss	(Canada) Gary Goodridge	K-1 World Grand Prix 2004, Japan	KO (Punch)	1	3:00
September 25, 2004	Loss	(Japan) Musashi	K-1 World Grand Prix 2004 Final Elimination, Japan	Decision (Unanimous)	3	3:00
February 4, 2004	Win	(Morocco) Hocine Boutrek	TK2 Kickboxing, Marseilles, France	Decision	5	2:00
March 27, 2004	Win	(Japan) Hiraku Hori	K-1 World Grand Prix 2004 in Saitama, Japan	TKO (Referee stoppage)	3	2:58
December 16, 2003	Loss	(Netherlands) Remy Bonjasky	K-1 World Grand Prix 2003, Japan	KO (Flying knee strike)	1	1:46
December 16, 2003	Win	(South Africa) Francois Botha	K-1 World Grand Prix 2003, Japan	Decision	3	3:00
November 10, 2003	Win	(South Africa) Francois Botha	K-1 World Grand Prix 2003 Final Elimination, Japan	Disqualification	1	
July 13, 2003	Loss	(Netherlands) Ernesto Hoost	K-1 World Grand Prix 2003 in Fukuoka, Japan	Decision (Unanimous)	2	3:00
June 14, 2003	Loss	(Belarus) Alexey Ignashov	K-1 World Grand Prix 2003 in Paris, France	TKO (Corner stoppage)	3	0:20
June 14, 2003	Win	(Morocco) Chalid Arrab	K-1 World Grand Prix 2003 in Paris, France	KO (Punch)	2	1:32
June 14, 2003	Win	(Morocco) Aziz Khattou	K-1 World Grand Prix 2003 in Paris, France	Decision (Unanimous)	3	3:00
May 17, 2003	Win	(France) Daniel Lentie	TK2 Kickboxing, Marseilles, France	KO	3	
June 4, 2003	Win	(Japan) Shingo Koyasu	K-1 Beast 2003, Japan	Decision (Unanimous)	5	3:00
December 31, 2002	Loss	(United States) Quinton Jackson	Inoki Bom-Ba-Ye 2002, Japan	Decision	3	3:00
September 22, 2002	Loss	(United States) Bob Sapp	K-1 Andy Spirits Japan GP 2002 Final, Japan	TKO (Referee Stoppage)	1	1:17
July 14, 2002	Loss	(United States) Quinton Jackson	K-1 World Grand Prix 2002 in Fukuoka, Japan	KO (Punch)	1	1:55
May 22, 2002	Win	(England) Nick Murray	K-1 World Grand Prix 2002 in Paris, France	KO	1	2:05
August 10, 2001	Win	(Japan) Tatsufumi Tomihira	K-1 World Grand Prix 2001 in Fukuoka, Japan	TKO (Referee stoppage)	4	2:30
July 20, 2001	Loss	(South Africa) Andrew Thomson	K-1 World Grand Prix 2001 in Nagoya, Japan	TKO (Referee stoppage)	1	1:15
March 17, 2001	Win	(Japan) Great Kusatsu	K-1 Gladiators 2001, Japan	Decision (Split)	5	3:00
October 12, 2000	Loss	(New Zealand) Ray Sefo	K-1 World Grand Prix 2000, Japan	TKO (Referee stoppage)	1	1:45
October 12, 2000	Loss	(Netherlands) Peter Aerts	K-1 World Grand Prix 2000, Japan	Decision (Unanimous)	3	3:00
October 11, 2000	Win	(Belarus) Andrei Zuravkov	La Nuit des Champions, Marseille, France			
August 20, 2000	Loss	(Brazil) Francisco Filho	K-1 World Grand Prix 2000 in Yokohama, Japan	TKO (Corner stoppage)	2	0:25
August 20, 2000	Win	(New Zealand) Ray Sefo	K-1 World Grand Prix 2000 in Yokohama, Japan	TKO (Corner stoppage)	2	3:00
August 20, 2000	Win	(Netherlands) Peter Aerts	K-1 World Grand Prix 2000 in Yokohama, Japan	TKO (Corner stoppage)	1	2:42
July 7, 2000	Win	(Netherlands) Peter Aerts	K-1 Spirits 2000, Japan	KO (Punch)	1	2:13
March 19, 2000	Win	(Japan) Nobu Hayashi	K-1 Burning 2000, Japan	TKO	2	1:52
November 20, 1999	Win	(United States) Jean-Claude Leuyer	Kickboxing Gala, Marseilles, France	KO		
July 18, 1999	Loss	(Germany) Stefan Leko	K-1 Dream '99 Semi Finals, Nagoya, Japan	Decision (Unanimous)	3	3:00
July 18, 1999	Win	(England) Kirkwood Walker	K-1 Dream '99 Quarter Finals, Nagoya, Japan	KO (Low kicks)	1	0:33
May 6, 1999	Win	(Croatia) Petar Majstorovic	K-1 Fight Night '99, Zurich, Switzerland	Decision (Unanimous)	5	3:00
February 27, 1999	Win	(Croatia) Nash Urladzic	La Nuit des Champions, Marseilles, France	Decision	5	3:00
00/11/1998	Win	(France) Gardois de Tholomese	La Nuit des Champions, Marseilles, France	KO	4	
00/09/1998	Win	(Russia) Alexandre Chvarev	La Nuit des Champions, Marseilles, France	KO	1	

== Mixed martial arts record ==
Res.	Record	Opponent	Method	Event	Date	Round	Time	Location	Notes
Loss	0–2	Bobby Ologun	Decision (unanimous)	K-1 Premium Dynamite!!, Japan	December 31, 2004	3	3:00	Osaka, Japan	
Loss	0–1	Don Frye	Submission (rear-naked choke)	Inoki Bom-Ba-Ye 2001, Japan	December 31, 2001	2	0:33	Saitama, Japan	

== See also ==
- List of male kickboxers
- List of K-1 events
- List of K-1 champions
