= K-1 World Grand Prix 2000 Final =

K-1 martial arts event in 2000

- Promotion: K-1
- Date: December 10, 2000
- Venue: Tokyo Dome
- City: Tokyo, Japan
- Attendance: 70,200

Event chronology
K-1 UK Global Heat 2000	K-1 World Grand Prix 2000 Final	K-1 Czech 2000

K-1 World Grand Prix 2000 Final was a kickboxing event promoted by the K-1 organization. It was the eighth K-1 Grand Prix final, involving eight of the world's top fighters, with all bouts fought under K-1 Rules (100 kg/156-220 lbs). The eight finalists were a mixture of invitees, some of whom had been at the previous year's final, or had qualified via preliminary tournaments (for more detail on this see bulleted list below).

As well as tournament bouts there were also two 'Super Fights', one involving Japanese middleweight star Takayuki Kohiruimaki against Wilreid Montargne, fought under K-1 MAX Rules (70 kg/152 lbs), the other involving UFC legend Frank Shamrock against Elvis Sinosic in a three-minute five rounds MMA match. In addition, there were also two 'freshman fights' involving local fighters. In total, sixteen fighters from nine countries represented at the event.

The tournament champion was Ernesto Hoost who defeated Ray Sefo in the final by third round unanimous decision. This would be Ernesto Hoost's third K-1 World Grand Prix victory, adding to the one he had won the previous year and another in '97. Ray Sefo would be making his first K-1 World Grand Prix final appearance. The event was held at the Tokyo Dome in Tokyo, Japan on Sunday December 10, 2000, in front of 65,000 spectators.

Tournament Qualifiers

- Cyril Abidi - K-1 World Grand Prix 2000 in Yokohama runner up
- Peter Aerts - Invitee, previous years final
- Francisco Filho - K-1 World Grand Prix 2000 in Yokohama winner
- Mirko Cro Cop - K-1 World Grand Prix 2000 in Fukuoka runner up
- Ernesto Hoost - Reigning champion, K-1 World Grand Prix 2000 in Nagoya runner up
- Stefan Leko - Invitee
- Musashi - K-1 Spirits 2000 winner
- Ray Sefo - Invitee, previous years final

Jérôme Le Banner and Mike Bernardo both won the K-1 World Grand Prix 2000 in Nagoya and K-1 World Grand Prix 2000 in Fukuoka respectively but were unable to participate in the tournament due to injury.

== K-1 World Grand Prix 2000 Final Tournament ==
Quarter Finals
(Croatia) Mirko Cro Cop
(Netherlands) Ernesto Hoost	DEC
(Brazil) Francisco Filho	DEC
(Germany) Stefan Leko
(France) Cyril Abidi
(Netherlands) Peter Aerts	DEC
(Japan) Musashi
(New Zealand) Ray Sefo	TKO

Semi Finals
(Netherlands) Ernesto Hoost	DEC
(Brazil) Francisco Filho
(France) Cyril Abidi *
(New Zealand) Ray Sefo	TKO

Final
(Netherlands) Ernesto Hoost	DEC
(New Zealand) Ray Sefo

* Peter Aerts was injured so Cyril Abidi replaced him in the Semi Finals

== Results ==
K-1 World Grand Prix 2000 Final Results
Freshman Fight 1 (-67 kg): K-1 Rules / 3Min. 3R
(Japan) Kazuki Hamasaki def. Reiji Kawakami (Japan)
Hamasaki defeated Kawakami by KO at 1:32 of the 2nd Round.
Freshman Fight 2 (-73 kg): K-1 Rules / 3Min. 5R
(Japan) Takashi Ohno def. Shingo Eguchi (Japan)
Ohno defeated Eguchi by 5th Round Unanimous Decision 3-0.
Super Fight 1 (-70 kg): K-1 Rules / 3Min. 5R
(Japan) Takayuki Kohiruimaki def. Wilreid Montargne (France)
Kohiruimaki defeated Montargne by KO (Kick) at 1:46 of the 5th Round.
K-1 Grand Prix Quarter Finals: K-1 Rules / 3Min. 3R Ext.1R
(Netherlands) Ernesto Hoost def. Mirko Cro Cop (Croatia)
Hoost defeated Cro Cop by Extra Round Unanimous Decision 3-0 (10-9, 10-9, 10-9). After 3 rounds the judges had scored it a Decision Draw 0-0 (30-30, 30-30, 30-30).
(Brazil) Francisco Filho def. Stefan Leko (Germany)
Filho defeated Leko by 2nd Extra Round Unanimous Decision 3-0 (10-9, 10-9, 10-9). After the 1st Extra Round the judges scored it a Decision Draw 0-0 (10-10, 10-10, 10-10), while after the first 3 rounds the judges had scored it a Decision Draw 0-0 (30-30, 30-29 Filho, 30-30).
(Netherlands) Peter Aerts def. Cyril Abidi (France)
Aerts defeated Abidi by 3rd Round Unanimous Decision 3-0 (29-26, 29-28, 29-26) but was unable to continue due to injury - Cyril Abidi would replace him in the Semi Finals.
(New Zealand) Ray Sefo def. Musashi (Japan)
Sefo defeated Musashi by TKO (Referee Stoppage, Punches) at 1:38 of the 1st Round.
K-1 Grand Prix Semi Finals: K-1 Rules / 3Min. 3R Ext.1R
(Netherlands) Ernesto Hoost def. Francisco Filho (Brazil)
Hoost defeated Filho by 3rd Round Unanimous Decision 3-0 (30-29, 30-29, 30-28).
(New Zealand) Ray Sefo def. Cyril Abidi (France)
Sefo defeated Abidi by TKO (Referee Stoppage, Punches) at 1:45 of the 1st Round.
Super Fight 2 (-90.5 kg): MMA Rules / 3Min. 5R
(United States) Frank Shamrock def. Elvis Sinosic (Australia)
Shamrock defeated Sinosic by 5th Round Decision (50-48).
K-1 Grand Prix Final: K-1 Rules / 3Min. 3R Ext.2R
(Netherlands) Ernesto Hoost def. Ray Sefo (New Zealand)
Hoost defeated Sefo by 3rd Round Unanimous Decision 3-0 (30-29, 30-29, 30-29).

== See also ==
- List of K-1 events
- List of K-1 champions
- List of male kickboxers
