= Semmy Schilt =

Dutch kickboxer, Ashihara karateka and mixed martial arts fighter

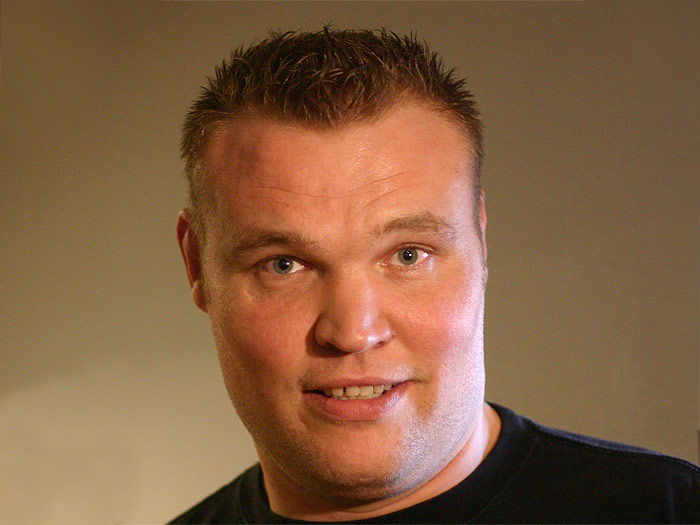
- Schilt in 2006
- Born: October 27, 1973 (age 52); Rotterdam, Netherlands
- Other names: Hightower
- Height: 212 cm (6 ft 11 in)
- Weight: 130 kg (287 lb; 20 st 7 lb)
- Division: Heavyweight; Super Heavyweight
- Style: Karate, Kickboxing, Judo, Submission Wrestling
- Fighting out of: Zuidlaren, Netherlands
- Team: Golden Glory
- Trainer: Dave Jonkers; Horia Rădulescu (part-time)
- Rank: 6th Dan Black Belt in Ashihara Karate; Certified Instructor in Pancrase Hybrid Wrestling
- Years active: 1996–2008 (MMA), 2002–2013 (Kickboxing)

Kickboxing record
- Total: 50
- Wins: 43
- By knockout: 20
- Losses: 6
- By knockout: 2
- Draws: 1

Mixed martial arts record
- Total: 41
- Wins: 26
- By knockout: 14
- By submission: 10
- By decision: 2
- Losses: 14
- By knockout: 2
- By submission: 6
- By decision: 6
- Draws: 1

Other information
- Website: semschilt.com
- Mixed martial arts record from Sherdog
- Last updated on: 31 December 2012

Sem "Semmy" Schilt (Dutch pronunciation: [ˈsɛmi ˈsxɪlt]; born 27 October 1973) is a Dutch actor and former kickboxer, karateka and mixed martial artist. Schilt holds the distinction of being the only kickboxer to have won 5 major heavyweight tournaments, being a four-time K-1 World Grand Prix Champion and one time Glory Heavyweight Grand Slam Champion. He also held the K-1 Super Heavyweight Championship and the Glory Heavyweight Championship titles. He is the only fighter in K-1 history to win the world championship three times in a row, and also shares the record with Ernesto Hoost for most Grands Prix won, with four.

Schilt began his professional career in 1996 as a mixed martial artist competing in Pancrase, where he is a former Openweight King Of Pancrase. He has also competed in Pride Fighting Championship and the UFC. Schilt is one of the most decorated heavyweight kickboxers in history, having won five major tournaments. He is widely regarded as one of the division's all-time greats.

== Background ==
Schilt began practicing Kyokushin Kaikan at 8 as both of his parents were practitioners. He later switched to Ashihara Kaikan at 12 and earned the rank of Black Belt at the age of 18. Schilt would also cross train in Kickboxing, Judo, and Submission Wrestling.

== Mixed martial arts career ==
=== Pancrase ===
Schilt debuted in mixed martial arts for Japanese promotion Pancrase, in which he debuted on May 16, 1996, at Pancrase: Truth 5 with an impressive rear naked choke victory over grappler Manabu Yamada.

His second match, on July 22, 1996, was against rising star Yuki Kondo at the 1996 Pancrase Neo-Blood Tournament, Round 1. Schilt would face Kondo three more times in his career. In the first of their matches, Kondo showed himself as the better wrestler, but Schilt's size enabled him to power out of his control and win some exchanges. They traded positions until the ring call at 15:00, with Kondo being declared the winner by split decision.

With a short 2–3 record, Schilt was pitted against Pancrase co-founder Masakatsu Funaki on February 22, 1997, at Pancrase: Alive 2. After circling around, Funaki scored a takedown, mounted Schilt and worked to an armbar, which Schilt had to spend a rope escape to get out from. Restarting the fight, Schilt reversed a takedown and got his own mount, but Funaki recovered guard and applied a toehold, forcing the karateka to spend another point. The two fighters then spent a few minutes clinched on a corner, until Funaki led him to the ground and locked in another toehold from half mount, making Schilt tap out.

On January 16, 1998, he fought the other co-founder of Pancrase, Minoru Suzuki at Pancrase: Advance 1. The Japanese wrestler took Schilt to the mat and kept side control for half of the match, but was not able to threaten him from the position aside from scarce armbar attempts, and Schilt eventually capitalized on one of them to escape. The situation repeated itself, but this time Suzuki successfully landed an armbar and Schilt barely reached the ropes to get an escape. Once standing again, however, Schilt went aggressively and landed a clean knee strike to Suzuki's chin, knocking him out for the win.

Schilt had a rematch with Masakatsu Funaki on March 18, 1998, at Pancrase: Advance 4, although he managed to take the bout to the judges, he lost on points due to spent rope escapes.

Months later, on September 14, he had his rubber match against Funaki at Pancrase: 1998 Anniversary Show. This time, the karateka showed himself capable of stopping the wrestler's takedowns, blocking the first of them with the aid of the ropes and a guillotine choke and reversing the second into Funaki's guard. After pressing for some minutes and avoiding a kneebar attempt, Schilt got the fight standing and scored a knockdown by two clinched knees. Funaki stood up and looked to continue the fight, but the Dutchman landed another knockdown, and finally finished him with a combination of knees and palm strikes.

On June 20, 1999, Schilt flew back to the Netherlands to face Gilbert Yvel in an interpromotional match. The bout was particularly intriguing because Yvel belonged to RINGS, Pancrase's rival promotion in Japan. They met under special rules, with Gilbert keeping his gloves for punching while Schilt preferred to go barehanded and use open palm strikes like it was done in Pancrase. When the match began, Schilt was knocked down by a shocking flurry of hooks from Yvel, but managed to recover before the eight count. Schilt came back and controlled Gilbert with open palms and knees to the body, but decided to take the fight to the ground, not wanting to risk another KO from the RINGS muay Thai specialist. However, Yvel was able to block all of his submission attempts on the mat, in large part due to the fast stand-ups of the format. In the second round, the RINGS fighter mounted Schilt. Schilt stood up and had a bleeding gash near his right eye. Schilt was left with his eye swollen shut. From that point, the two strikers exchanged hits until Yvel overpowered Schilt, landing multiple unanswered punches for the KO stoppage.

Schilt returned for another interpromotional match against RINGS on June 4, 2000, facing Yoshihisa Yamamoto. Schilt won the match in under three minutes after a striking combination.

On November 28, 1999, Schilt became the Openweight King Of Pancrase by winning against Yuki Kondo via rear naked choke at Pancrase: Breakthrough 10. He had two successful defenses against Kazuo Takahashi and Osami Shibuya before vacating it due to signing with the UFC.

=== Ultimate Fighting Championship ===
Schilt made his debut in Ultimate Fighting Championship on May 4, 2001, facing fellow Pancrase alumni Pete Williams at UFC 31. Schilt was taken down and mounted, but he used his height advantage to prevent Williams from applying ground and pound, and once they were back to standing he knocked out Williams with body kicks and punches.

His second and last appearance in the promotion would be at the next event, UFC 32, where Schilt was pitted against Josh Barnett. Schilt was taken down and mounted again, but Barnett was able to land abundant strikes, some of which were answered by Schilt, cutting both of their faces and spilling a large amount of blood on the mat. Eventually, Schilt flipped Barnett over, but Barnett locked an armbar from the guard and made Schilt tap out.

=== PRIDE Fighting Championships ===
After his UFC tenure, Schilt returned to Japan for PRIDE Fighting Championship, making his debut on September 24, 2001, at PRIDE 16. His opponent was originally Igor Vovchanchyn, but Akira Shoji volunteered to fight him after Vovchanchyn withdrew from the match due to injuries. Shoji took Schilt to the ground, but Schilt reversed him and proceeded to land heavy strikes both on the ground and standing. Schilt finished him with a combination of knee, punch and kick for the KO. Schilt followed with two easy victories over K-1 legend Masaaki Satake and professional wrestler Yoshihiro Takayama at PRIDE 17 and PRIDE 18, knocking them both out.

On June 23, 2002, Schilt faced Fedor Emelianenko, who was debuting in PRIDE after a solid career in Fighting Network RINGS at PRIDE 21. Although Schilt avoided a dangerous armbar attempt at the start of the match, Emelianenko pinned him and scored repeated punches and knees to his face until the end of the round. At the second round, Schilt managed to keep the Russian on his guard and minimize the damage of his ground and pound, but Emelianenko took over again and ended the fight punishing the Dutchman with more punches on the ground. Fedor was declared the winner after 3 rounds.

Schilt tried to bounce back on November 24, 2002, against Antônio Rodrigo Nogueira at PRIDE 23. The match was originally a title bout for the Pride Heavyweight Championship, but it was changed to a non-title bout due to Schilt's loss to Emelianenko. Capitalizing on his superiority on the ground, the Brazilian pulled guard at several instances and eventually got mount. When Schilt flipped him over, Nogueira feigned an armbar from the guard and then locked in a triangle choke, making Schilt tap out in his second loss in PRIDE.

At the end of 2003, he took part in the annual event Inoki Bom-Ba-Ye for a rematch against Josh Barnett. Schilt was defeated again by armbar, this time in the third round.

== Kickboxing career ==
=== K-1 ===
On November 19, 2005, Schilt made his first appearance at the K-1 finals. Schilt beat Ray Sefo by decision in the quarter-finals and the defending champion Remy Bonjasky via knockout in the semifinals. Schilt then met Glaube Feitosa in the tournament finals and won via knockout due to a knee strike to win his first K-1 World Grand Prix title.

On December 31, 2005, at K-1 PREMIUM 2005 Dynamite!!, he defeated former four time K-1 World Grand Prix champion Ernesto Hoost via TKO.

Schilt lost twice in 2006 against Peter Aerts and Choi Hong-man but still made it to the finals after beating Bjorn Bregy via knockout. He defended his title after defeating Jerome Le Banner, Ernesto Hoost and Peter Aerts all by unanimous decisions.

On April 3, 2007, he defeated Ray Sefo by second-round KO to become K-1's first Super Heavyweight Champion at K-1 World Grand Prix 2007 Yokohama.

Schilt faced and defeated the K-1 Hawaii GP Champion Mighty Mo by unanimous decision on June 23, 2007, at the K-1 Amsterdam GP, defending his Super-Heavyweight Title.

At the 2007 K-1 World Grand Prix final eliminations in Seoul, South Korea, Schilt faced Paul Slowinski. He won via KO in the first round from a knee strike. With the win, he qualified for the World Grand Prix Finals.

In the first round of the World Grand Prix 2007 Finals, Schilt was matched against Brazilian karateka Glaube Feitosa. Schilt survived a near knockdown from one of Glaube's famed Brazilian kicks to win by unanimous decision. This marked the third time he had defeated Feitosa in his career.

In the semi-finals he met Jerome LeBanner for the second time. Schilt was put on the defensive for most of the first round. Just before time expired, Schilt landed a knee strike which badly hurt LeBanner. Before the second round started, LeBanner was noticeably limping in his corner. Early in the second round, a low kick from Schilt sent him to the canvas in obvious pain. LeBanner was able to make it back to his feet however his corner threw in the towel to avoid further injury.

The final match of the 2007 K-1 World Grand Prix was a rematch from the year before, with Schilt matched up against fellow Dutchman Peter Aerts for the third time. The match came to an abrupt end 1:49 in after Aerts injured his knee and could not continue. With the win Schilt became the third man to win the K-1 World Grand Prix three times, and the only man in history to win three consecutive Grand Prix crowns.

In September 2008, Schilt faced Peter Aerts again and lost by decision at the K-1 World Grand Prix 2008 in Seoul Final 16.

Schilt had small roles in the feature films Transporter 3 and Amsterdam Heavy.

On May 16, 2009, Schilt lost to Badr Hari via first-round KO at the Dutch Kickboxing event It's Showtime 2009 Amsterdam, in his home country of the Netherlands. The fight was for the It's Showtime Heavyweight Championship.

At the 2009 Final 16, Schilt beat the rising Romanian Daniel Ghita by unanimous decision. At the final selection he chose to fight Jerome LeBanner and went on to defeat him for the fourth time in his career in the first round via KO. In the second round he was matched against Remy Bonjasky, whom he also defeated for the third time via KO in the first round, after getting knocked down. In the finals he beat Badr Hari via KO in the first round to win his fourth GP title, also getting the record of fastest GP win with a total time over all 3 matches of 355 seconds. With the win he became the second man in history to win the K-1 WGP Title four times (Ernesto Hoost being the first).

In April 2010, he successfully made his fourth title defence against teammate Errol Zimmerman by unanimous decision at the K-1 World Grand Prix 2010 in Yokohama. At the 2010 Final 16 he beat Hesdy Gerges by a close decision, after sustaining a cut to his shin in the fight that required four stitches. In the semi-finals of the K-1 World Grand Prix 2010 Final he was defeated for the first time in a tournament by Peter Aerts in a gruelling decision.

=== Glory ===
In 2012 Schilt returned to the ring with a more aggressive style earning a convincing victories over Brice Guidon and Errol Zimmerman.

At the sixteen-man Glory Heavyweight Grand Slam in Saitama, Japan on December 31, 2012, Schilt rematched Brice Guidon at the first stage of the tournament. He floored the Frenchman with a left jab in the opening seconds of round two before finishing him with the same technique soon after. At the quarter-final stage, he went up against Rico Verhoeven and, as he won the first of the two rounds, was given his passage to the semi-finals via unanimous decision. There, he used his eleven-inch height and twenty-seven kilogram weight advantage to outpoint Gokhan Saki to another two-round unanimous points verdict. A highly anticipated match-up with Daniel Ghiţă awaited him in the final and, after a slow start to the three-minute first round, Schilt sent the Romanian bruiser to the canvas with a left high kick. Despite Ghiţă seemingly recovering from the blow, referee Joop Ubeda controversially called a halt to the contest, giving Schilt the TKO win and the inaugural Glory Grand Slam crown.

== Retirement ==
It was reported on 26 June 2013, that Schilt retired immediately after being instructed to do so by his medical team due to a heart condition.

== Fighting style ==
Schilt's excellent conditioning and hulking size also lent him to attritional fighting, where he would wear his opponents down with strikes at range throughout the course of a fight. His careful, technical, style and toughness made him very difficult to knock out; he was only finished twice in his kickboxing career.

== Championships and accomplishments ==
=== Kickboxing ===
- Glory
  - Glory Hall of Fame (2022)
  - Glory Heavyweight Championship (One time; First)
  - Glory 2012 Heavyweight Grand Slam Tournament Champion
- K-1
  - K-1 Super Heavyweight Championship (One time; First; Last)
    - Four successful title defenses
  - 2009 K-1 World Grand Prix Champion
  - 2007 K-1 World Grand Prix Champion
  - 2006 K-1 World Grand Prix Champion
  - 2005 K-1 World Grand Prix Champion
  - 2005 K-1 World Grand Prix in Paris Champion

=== Mixed martial arts ===
- Pancrase
  - Openweight King of Pancrase (One time)
    - Two successful title defenses
- Fight Matrix
  - 1999 Fighter of the Year

=== Karate ===
- 2 times Daido Juku Hokutoki champion. open-weight division, 1996/1997
- 2 times IBK (International Budo Kai) European Champion Full contact karate (Knockdown karate rules) 1995/1996
- 3 times IBK (International Budo Kai) Dutch Champion Full contact karate (Knockdown karate rules) 1993/1994/1995
- Runner-up Open British Kyokushin Championship 1997
- Black Belt Magazine
  - 2008 Full-Contact Fighter of the Year
- In 2013 Semmy Schilt was officially inducted into the CBME's Dutch National Hall of Fame for the Martial arts.
- Rank
  - 6th dan black belt in Ashihara kaikan
  - Certified Instructor in Pancrase Hybrid Wrestling

== Kickboxing record ==
Kickboxing Record
43 Wins (20 (T)KO's, 21 Decisions), 6 Losses, 1 Draw
Date	Result	Opponent	Event	Location	Method	Round	Time	Record
31 Dec 2012	Win	(Romania) Daniel Ghiță	Glory 4: Tokyo – Heavyweight Grand Slam Tournament, Final	Saitama, Japan	KO (Head kick)	1	2:52	43–6–1
Wins the Glory Heavyweight Grand Slam Tournament.
31 Dec 2012	Win	(Turkey) Gökhan Saki	Glory 4: Tokyo – Heavyweight Grand Slam Tournament, semi-finals	Saitama, Japan	Decision (unanimous)	2	3:00	42–6–1
31 Dec 2012	Win	(Netherlands) Rico Verhoeven	Glory 4: Tokyo – Heavyweight Grand Slam Tournament, quarter-finals	Saitama, Japan	Decision (unanimous)	2	2:00	41–6–1
31 Dec 2012	Win	(France) Brice Guidon	Glory 4: Tokyo – Heavyweight Grand Slam Tournament, First Round	Saitama, Japan	KO (left jab)	2	0:55	40–6–1
26 May 2012	Win	(Netherlands) Errol Zimmerman	Glory 1: Stockholm	Stockholm, Sweden	TKO (corner stoppage)	3	2:00	39-6–1
Wins the Glory Heavyweight Championship.
23 Mar 2012	Win	(France) Brice Guidon	United Glory 15	Moscow, Russia	Decision (unanimous)	3	3:00	38–6–1
11 Dec 2010	Loss	(Netherlands) Peter Aerts	K-1 World Grand Prix 2010 Final	Tokyo, Japan	Decision (majority)	3	3:00	37–6–1
11 Dec 2010	Win	(Japan) Kyotaro	K-1 World Grand Prix 2010 Final	Tokyo, Japan	Decision (unanimous)	3	3:00	37–5–1
2 Oct 2010	Win	(Egypt) Hesdy Gerges	K-1 World Grand Prix 2010 in Seoul Final 16	Seoul, South Korea	Decision (majority)	3	3:00	36–5
Qualifies for the K-1 World Grand Prix 2010.
3 Apr 2010	Win	(Netherlands) Errol Zimmerman	K-1 World Grand Prix 2010 in Yokohama	Yokohama, Japan	Decision (unanimous)	3	3:00	35–5–1
Defends his K-1 Super Heavyweight Title.
5 Dec 2009	Win	(Morocco) Badr Hari	K-1 World Grand Prix 2009 Final	Yokohama, Japan	TKO (ref stop/3 knockdowns)	1	1:14	34–5–1
Wins K-1 World Grand Prix 2009 final.
5 Dec 2009	Win	(Netherlands) Remy Bonjasky	K-1 World Grand Prix 2009 Final	Yokohama, Japan	KO (right low kick)	1	2:38	33–5–1
5 Dec 2009	Win	(France) Jérôme Le Banner	K-1 World Grand Prix 2009 Final	Yokohama, Japan	KO (left front kick)	1	1:27	32–5–1
17 Oct 2009	Win	(Belarus) Alexey Ignashov	Ultimate Glory 11: A Decade of Fights	Amsterdam, Netherlands	Decision (unanimous)	3	3:00	31–5–1
26 Sep 2009	Win	(Romania) Daniel Ghiţă	K-1 World Grand Prix 2009 in Seoul Final 16	Seoul, South Korea	Decision (unanimous)	3	3:00	30–5–1
Qualifies for K-1 World Grand Prix 2009 final.
16 May 2009	Loss	(Morocco) Badr Hari	It's Showtime 2009 Amsterdam	Amsterdam, Netherlands	KO (right cross)	1	0:45	29–5–1
Fight was for vacant It's Showtime Heavyweight title.
28 Mar 2009	Win	(Egypt) Hesdy Gerges	K-1 World Grand Prix 2009 in Yokohama	Yokohama, Japan	Decision (unanimous)	3	3:00	29–4–1
27 Sep 2008	Loss	(Netherlands) Peter Aerts	K-1 World Grand Prix 2008 in Seoul Final 16	Seoul, South Korea	Decision (majority)	3	3:00	28–4–1
Fails to qualify for K-1 World Grand Prix 2008 final.
29 Jun 2008	Win	(France) Jérôme Le Banner	K-1 World GP 2008 in Fukuoka	Fukuoka, Japan	Decision (majority)	3	3:00	28–3–1
Retains K-1 Super Heavyweight Title.
13 Apr 2008	Win	(New Zealand) Mark Hunt	K-1 World Grand Prix 2008 in Yokohama	Yokohama, Japan	TKO (spinning back kick)	1	3:00	27–3–1
Retains K-1 Super Heavyweight Title.
8 Dec 2007	Win	(Netherlands) Peter Aerts	K-1 World Grand Prix 2007 Final	Yokohama, Japan	TKO (Leg Injury)	1	1:49	26–3–1
Wins K-1 World Grand Prix 2007 final.
8 Dec 2007	Win	(France) Jérôme Le Banner	K-1 World Grand Prix 2007 Final	Yokohama, Japan	TKO (corner stoppage)	2	1:02	25–3–1
8 Dec 2007	Win	(Brazil) Glaube Feitosa	K-1 World Grand Prix 2007 Final	Yokohama, Japan	Decision (unanimous)	3	3:00	24–3–1
29 Sep 2007	Win	(Australia) Paul Slowinski	K-1 World Grand Prix 2007 in Seoul Final 16	Seoul, South Korea	KO (knee strike)	1	2:26	23–3–1
Qualifies for K-1 World Grand Prix 2007 final.
23 Jun 2007	Win	(United States) Mighty Mo	K-1 World Grand Prix 2007 in Amsterdam	Amsterdam, Netherlands	Decision (unanimous)	3	3:00	22–3–1
Retains K-1 Super Heavyweight Title.
4 Mar 2007	Win	(New Zealand) Ray Sefo	K-1 World Grand Prix 2007 in Yokohama	Osaka, Japan	KO (punch)	2	0:26	21–3–1
Wins K-1 Super Heavyweight Title.
31 Dec 2006	Win	(Australia) Peter Graham	K-1 PREMIUM 2006 Dynamite!!	Osaka, Japan	Decision (unanimous)	5	3:00	20–3–1
2 Dec 2006	Win	(Netherlands) Peter Aerts	K-1 World Grand Prix 2006 in Tokyo Final	Tokyo, Japan	Decision (unanimous)	3	3:00	19–3–1
Wins K-1 World Grand Prix 2006 final.
2 Dec 2006	Win	(Netherlands) Ernesto Hoost	K-1 World Grand Prix 2006 in Tokyo Final	Tokyo, Japan	Decision (unanimous)	3	3:00	18–3–1
2 Dec 2006	Win	(France) Jérôme Le Banner	K-1 World Grand Prix 2006 in Tokyo Final	Tokyo, Japan	Decision (unanimous)	3	3:00	17–3–1
30 Sep 2006	Win	(Switzerland) Bjorn Bregy	K-1 World Grand Prix 2006 in Osaka opening round	Osaka, Japan	KO (left punch)	1	2:21	16–3–1
Qualifies for K-1 World Grand Prix 2006 final.
3 Jun 2006	Loss	(South Korea) Choi Hong-man	K-1 World Grand Prix 2006 in Seoul	Seoul, South Korea	Decision (split)	3	3:00	15–3–1
13 May 2006	Win	(Netherlands) Lloyd van Dams	K-1 World Grand Prix 2006 in Amsterdam	Amsterdam, Netherlands	Decision (unanimous)	3	3:00	15–2–1
29 Apr 2006	Win	(Japan) Musashi	K-1 World Grand Prix 2006 in Las Vegas	Las Vegas, Nevada, United States	Decision (unanimous)	3	3:00	14–2–1
5 Mar 2006	Loss	(Netherlands) Peter Aerts	K-1 World Grand Prix 2006 in Auckland	Auckland, New Zealand	Decision (majority)	3	3:00	13–2–1
31 Dec 2005	Win	(Netherlands) Ernesto Hoost	K-1 PREMIUM 2005 Dynamite!!	Osaka, Japan	TKO (referee stoppage)	2	0:41	13–1–1
19 Nov 2005	Win	(Brazil) Glaube Feitosa	K-1 World Grand Prix 2005 in Tokyo Final	Tokyo, Japan	KO (knee strike)	1	0:48	12–1–1
Wins K-1 World Grand Prix 2005 final.
19 Nov 2005	Win	(Netherlands) Remy Bonjasky	K-1 World Grand Prix 2005 in Tokyo Final	Tokyo, Japan	KO (knee strike)	1	2:58	11–1–1
19 Nov 2005	Win	(New Zealand) Ray Sefo	K-1 World Grand Prix 2005 in Tokyo Final	Tokyo, Japan	Decision (unanimous)	3	3:00	10–1–1
23 Sep 2005	Win	(Brazil) Glaube Feitosa	K-1 World Grand Prix 2005 in Osaka – final elimination	Osaka, Japan	Decision (unanimous)	3	3:00	9–1–1
Qualifies for K-1 World Grand Prix 2005 final.
27 May 2005	Win	(France) Naoufal Benazzouz	K-1 World Grand Prix 2005 in Paris	Paris, France	KO (right punch)	2	2:32	8–1–1
Wins K-1 World Grand Prix 2005 in Paris Title.
27 May 2005	Win	(France) Freddy Kemayo	K-1 World Grand Prix 2005 in Paris	Paris, France	TKO (right kicks)	3	1:19	7–1–1
27 May 2005	Win	(Czech Republic) Petr Vondracek	K-1 World Grand Prix 2005 in Paris	Paris, France	KO	2	2:42	6–1–1
19 Mar 2005	Win	(Brazil) Montanha Silva	K-1 World Grand Prix 2005 in Seoul	Seoul, South Korea	KO (right low kick)	1	1:22	5–1–1
6 Nov 2004	Win	(South Africa) Jan Nortje	Titans 1st	Kitakyushu, Japan	TKO	2	0:57	4–1–1
20 May 2004	Loss	(Belarus) Alexey Ignashov	It's Showtime 2004 Amsterdam	Amsterdam, Netherlands	KO (left knee strike)	1	1:20	3–1–1
13 Jul 2003	Win	(Netherlands) Remy Bonjasky	K-1 World Grand Prix 2003 in Fukuoka	Saitama, Japan	Decision (unanimous)	5	3:00	3–0–1
5 Oct 2002	Win	(Canada) Michael McDonald	K-1 World Grand Prix 2002 final elimination	Fukuoka, Japan	Decision (unanimous)	3	3:00	2–0–1
28 Aug 2002	Draw	(Netherlands) Ernesto Hoost	Pride Shockwave	Tokyo, Japan	Decision draw	5	3:00	1–0–1
21 Apr 2002	Win	(Japan) Musashi	K-1 Burning 2002	Hiroshima, Japan	Decision (split)	3	3:00	1–0
Legend: Win Loss Draw/No contest Notes

== Mixed martial arts record ==
Professional record breakdown
41 matches	26 wins	14 losses
By knockout	14	2
By submission	10	6
By decision	2	6
Draws	1	

Res.	Record	Opponent	Method	Event	Date	Round	Time	Location	Notes
Win	26–14–1	Mighty Mo	Submission (triangle choke)	Fields Dynamite!! 2008	December 31, 2008	1	5:17	Saitama, Saitama, Japan	
Win	25–14–1	Nandor Guelmino	TKO (punches)	LOTR: Schilt vs. Guelmino	January 12, 2008	1	4:20	Belgrade, Serbia	
Win	24–14–1	Min-Soo Kim	Submission (triangle choke)	Hero's 6	August 5, 2006	1	4:47	Tokyo, Japan	
Loss	23–14–1	Sergei Kharitonov	TKO (punches)	PRIDE Critical Countdown 2004	June 20, 2004	1	9:19	Kobe, Japan	2004 PRIDE Heavyweight Grand Prix Quarterfinals.
Win	23–13–1	Gan McGee	Submission (armbar)	PRIDE Total Elimination 2004	April 25, 2004	1	5:02	Saitama, Saitama, Japan	2004 PRIDE Heavyweight Grand Prix First Round
Loss	22–13–1	Josh Barnett	Submission (armbar)	Inoki Bom-Ba-Ye 2003	December 31, 2003	3	4:48	Kobe, Japan	For the Pancrase Openweight Championship.
Loss	22–12–1	Antônio Rodrigo Nogueira	Submission (triangle choke)	PRIDE 23	November 24, 2002	1	6:36	Tokyo, Japan	
Loss	22–11–1	Fedor Emelianenko	Decision (unanimous)	PRIDE 21	June 23, 2002	3	5:00	Saitama, Saitama, Japan	
Win	22–10–1	Yoshihiro Takayama	KO (punches)	PRIDE 18	December 23, 2001	1	3:09	Fukuoka Prefecture, Japan	
Win	21–10–1	Masaaki Satake	TKO (front kick and punches)	PRIDE 17	November 3, 2001	1	2:18	Tokyo, Japan	
Win	20–10–1	Akira Shoji	KO (soccer kick)	PRIDE 16	September 24, 2001	1	8:19	Osaka, Japan	
Loss	19–10–1	Josh Barnett	Submission (armbar)	UFC 32	June 29, 2001	1	4:21	East Rutherford, New Jersey, United States	
Win	19–9–1	Pete Williams	TKO (body kick and punches)	UFC 31	May 4, 2001	2	1:28	Atlantic City, New Jersey, United States	
Draw	18–9–1	Aleksey Medvedev	Draw	2H2H II Simply The Best	March 18, 2001	2	10:00	Rotterdam, Netherlands	
Win	18–9	Bob Schrijber	Technical Submission (guillotine choke)	It's Showtime – Exclusive	October 22, 2000	2	1:00	Haarlem, Netherlands	
Win	17–9	Osami Shibuya	TKO (punches)	Pancrase – 2000 Anniversary Show	September 24, 2000	1	8:55	Yokohama, Japan	Defended Pancrase Openweight Championship.
Win	16–9	Yoshihisa Yamamoto	KO (knee and punch)	Rings Holland: Di Capo Di Tutti Capi	June 4, 2000	1	2:54	Utrecht, Netherlands	
Win	15–9	Kazuo Takahashi	TKO (punches)	Pancrase – Trans 3	April 30, 2000	1	7:30	Yokohama, Japan	Defended the Pancrase Openweight Championship.
Win	14–9	Yuki Kondo	Submission (rear-naked choke)	Pancrase – Breakthrough 10	November 28, 1999	1	2:28	Osaka, Japan	Won the Pancrase Openweight Championship.
Win	13–9	Ikuhisa Minowa	Decision (unanimous)	Pancrase – 1999 Anniversary Show	September 18, 1999	1	15:00	Tokyo, Japan	
Win	12–9	Katsuomi Inagaki	KO (knee)	Pancrase – Breakthrough 8	September 4, 1999	1	8:23	Sendai, Japan	
Win	11–9	Osami Shibuya	Submission (rear-naked choke)	Pancrase – Breakthrough 7	July 6, 1999	1	12:06	Tokyo, Japan	
Loss	10–9	Gilbert Yvel	KO (punches)	Rings Holland: The Kings of the Magic Ring	June 20, 1999	2	4:45	Utrecht, Netherlands	
Loss	10–8	Yuki Kondo	Decision (lost points)	Pancrase: Breakthrough 4	April 18, 1999	1	20:00	Yokohama, Japan	
Win	10–7	Takafumi Ito	Submission (choke)	Pancrase: Breakthrough 3	March 9, 1999	1	1:45	Tokyo, Japan	
Win	9–7	Masakatsu Funaki	KO (body punch)	Pancrase – 1998 Anniversary Show	September 14, 1998	1	7:13	Tokyo, Japan	
Win	8–7	Guy Mezger	TKO (palm strikes)	Pancrase – Advance 8	June 21, 1998	1	13:15	Tokyo, Japan	
Win	7–7	Kazuo Takahashi	KO (strikes)	Pancrase – Advance 6	May 12, 1998	1	5:44	Yokohama, Japan	
Win	6–7	Jason Godsey	TKO (cut)	Pancrase – Advance 5	April 26, 1998	1	1:47	Yokohama, Japan	
Loss	5–7	Masakatsu Funaki	Decision (lost points)	Pancrase – Advance 4	March 18, 1998	1	15:00	Tokyo, Japan	
Loss	5–6	Satoshi Hasegawa	Submission (ankle lock)	Pancrase – Advance 2	February 6, 1998	1	3:56	Kobe, Japan	
Win	5–5	Minoru Suzuki	KO (knee)	Pancrase – Advance 1	January 16, 1998	1	9:52	Tokyo, Japan	
Loss	4–5	Yuki Kondo	Decision (unanimous)	Pancrase: Alive 7	June 30, 1997	1	20:00	Fukuoka Prefecture, Japan	
Win	4–4	Takaku Fuke	Submission (rear-naked choke)	Pancrase: Alive 5	May 24, 1997	1	8:59	Kobe, Japan	
Win	3–4	Kazuo Takahashi	TKO (palm strikes)	Pancrase: Alive 3	March 22, 1997	1	7:00	Nagoya, Japan	
Loss	2–4	Masakatsu Funaki	Submission (toe hold)	Pancrase: Alive 2	February 22, 1997	1	5:47	Chiba, Japan	
Loss	2–3	Guy Mezger	Decision (lost points)	Pancrase: Alive 1	January 17, 1997	1	20:00	Tokyo, Japan	
Win	2–2	Osami Shibuya	Decision (majority)	Pancrase – Truth 10	December 15, 1996	1	10:00	Tokyo, Japan	
Loss	1–2	Ryushi Yanagisawa	Submission (ankle lock)	Pancrase – Truth 7	October 28, 1996	1	0:51	Nagoya, Japan	
Loss	1–1	Yuki Kondo	Decision (split)	Pancrase – 1996 Neo-Blood Tournament, Round 1	July 22, 1996	1	10:00	Tokyo, Japan	
Win	1–0	Manabu Yamada	Submission (rear-naked choke)	Pancrase – Truth 5	May 16, 1996	1	5:44	Tokyo, Japan	

== Acting ==
Year	Title	Role
2007	Flikken Maastricht	Bodyguard
2008	Transporter 3	The Giant
2011	Amsterdam Heavy	
2011	Nova Zembla	Claes
2012	Black Out	Abel
2014	T.I.M. (The Incredible Machine)	
2022	Flikken Rotterdam	Crematorium employee
