= Immonen =

Immonen is a Finnish surname, most prevalent in Kainuu. Notable people with the surname include:

- Antero Immonen (born 1935), Finnish ski jumper
- Janne Immonen (born 1968), Finnish cross country skier
- Jarkko Immonen (born 1982), Finnish ice hockey player
- Jarkko Immonen (ice hockey, born 1984), Finnish ice hockey player
- Jukka Immonen (born 1978), Finnish musician, record producer and composer
- Kaarina Immonen, Finnish United Nations official
- Kathryn Immonen, Canadian comic book and webcomic writer
- Lotta Immonen (born 1996), Finnish curler
- Mika Immonen (1972–2025), Finnish pool player
- Olli Immonen (born 1986), member of the Finnish Parliament
- Riitta Immonen (1918–2008), Finnish fashion artist and entrepreneur
- Riku Immonen (born 1974), Finnish Muay Thai kickboxer and coach
- Stuart Immonen, Canadian comic book artist
- Tomi Immonen (born 1966), Finnish politician
- Waltteri Immonen (born 1967), Finnish ice hockey defenseman and coach
