= Revgear =

Company

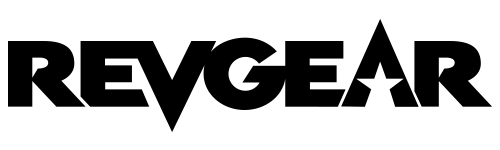
- Type: Private
- Founded: January 20, 1996; 30 years ago
- Founder: Paul Reavlin
- Headquarters: Van Nuys, Los Angeles, United States
- Area served: Worldwide
- Products: Martial arts supplies, equipment, and apparel
- Website: www.revgear.com

Revgear is an American company that encompasses innovative designs, development, manufacturing, worldwide marketing and sales of martial arts supplies, equipment, apparel, and services. The company is headquartered in Van Nuys, California, in the Los Angeles metropolitan area.

== History ==
The company was founded in July 1996 by Paul Reavlin, a CPA and Krav Maga First Degree Black Belt. In addition to manufacturing martial arts supplies and equipment, the company produces live events under the Revgear Seminar Division. Nationwide events include Revolution: International Martial Arts Professionals Conference, Revgear University, Revgear Tournament of Champions for Muay Thai, and Revgear Competition League for Brazilian jiu-jitsu. Revgear has sponsored many professional athletes in martial arts and combat sports.

== Products and services ==
Revgear Products Division is known for its range of martial arts equipment. The company started with three products: a knuckle protector, known today as the MMA training glove, and two styles of kick and punch shields, a curved version and the original five-sided Tombstone. Today, Revgear develops and manufactures boxing and MMA gloves, shin guards, headgear, target pads, sparring gear and hundreds of other products for a multitude of disciplines such as Muay Thai, kickboxing, Krav Maga, Jiu Jitsu, and mixed martial arts. Revgear has launched multiple limited edition series including Master Toddy Series, Revgear Combat Series, Samurai Series, Thai Destroyer Series, and others. Revgear recently introduced its Phoenix Sparring Mitt, an all-in-one focus mitt and boxing glove, and Fitness Pod, a multi-purpose throwing bag driving cross-training to the next level.

In 2014, Revgear premiered Revgear Competition League and Revolution: International Martial Arts Professionals Conference under its Revgear Seminar Division.

== Marketing ==
=== Martial arts events ===
Revgear is the preferred glove, headgear, and shin guard provider of many professional and amateur martial arts organizations and competitions in karate, Muay Thai, Jiu Jitsu and mixed martial arts. MMA promotions using Revgear as their official ‘glove’ include BAMMA USA, Colosseum Combat, and Sparta Combat League.

=== Athlete endorsement and sponsorship ===
Revgear has worked closely with professional athletes and coaches throughout their 20-year history to test, promote, and advertise the brand and products.

Revgear’s first professional endorsed athlete was Marco Ruas. He was heavily involved in testing and developing equipment during the early years of the company. The company continues to test their products with industry professionals including Erik Paulson, Rafael Cordeiro, Mark DellaGrotte, Cesar Gracie, and others.

Revgear was an official, approved sponsor of the Ultimate Fighting Championship and sponsored hundreds of pro-level champions and mixed martial artists including Tim Kennedy, Rory MacDonald, Johny Hendricks, Shane Carwin, Dan Hardy, Ed Herman, Ricardo Lamas, Chris Camozzi, Alan Jouban, Roy Nelson, and many others.

In addition, Revgear has supported numerous amateur athletes in combat sports through the Revgear Ambassador Program. The program was designed to provide training and competition equipment and apparel for non-professionals, advancing their skills to become the next generation of stars in their sport.
