= Xhavit Bajrami =

Swiss kickboxer

- Born: October 30, 1975 (age 50); Dumosh, Podujevë, Kosovo
- Other names: The Gentleman
- Nationality: Swiss
- Height: 1.97 m (6 ft 5 1/2 in)
- Weight: 101 kg (223 lb; 15.9 st)
- Division: Heavyweight
- Style: Seidokaikan Karate, kickboxing
- Fighting out of: Luzern, Switzerland
- Team: Team Andy; Chakuriki Gym; Team Bajrami
- Trainer: Andy Hug; Michael Thompson; Peter Aerts; Rene Rooze
- Rank: Black belt in Seidokaikan
- Years active: 1995–2012

Professional boxing record
- Total: 3
- Wins: 3

Kickboxing record
- Total: 49
- Wins: 34
- By knockout: 19
- Losses: 13
- By knockout: 2
- Draws: 2
- Last updated on: June 2, 2012

Xhavit Bajrami^{[a]} (born October 30, 1975) is a Swiss former kickboxer who competed in the heavyweight division. A Seido karate practitioner and Andy Hug student, Bajrami built up an undefeated record domestically before he was recruited by K-1 where he won the K-1 Braves '99 tournament and finished as runner-up in two other tournaments. He is also a two-time Muay Thai world champion, having won the ISKA World Super Heavyweight title in 2004 and the WKN World Super Heavyweight strap in 2010.

== Early life ==
A Kosovar Albanian, Bajrami was born in Dumosh, SFR Yugoslavia (now Kosovo) in 1975. He relocated to Switzerland where he began practicing Seido karate and eventually kickboxing.

== Career ==
=== K-1 career (1998–2004) ===
Bajrami transitioned from full contact karate to kickboxing under the tutelage of fellow karateka-turned-kickboxers Andy Hug and Michael Thompson, and amassed an undefeated record fighting domestically before being recruited by the world's premier kickboxing promotion, K-1 in 1998. In his promotional debut, Bajrami entered into a one night, eight-man tournament held on May 6, 1998 at K-1 Fight Night '98 in Zurich. He needed an extension round to get past Matteo Minonzie in the quarter-finals, and was then eliminated from the tournament in the semis when his bout with Rob van Esdonk was stopped by the doctor in the first round. The stoppage was controversial as Bajrami claimed to have been hit by an illegal elbow from van Esdonk and refused to return to his feet, prompting the doctor to deem him unable to fight. He was back in action just over a month later when he fought to a five-round draw with Kirkwood Walker at K-1 Dream '98 in Nagoya, Japan on July 17, 1998.

Beginning his 1999 campaign on May 5 at K-1 Fight Night '99 in Zurich, Bajrami went up against Carl Bernardo, brother of the great Mike Bernardo, and stopped the South African with a kick in round one. Just fifteen days later in Fukuoka, Japan, Bajrami was among the eight fighters battling it out to win the tournament at K-1 Braves '99. He defeated Siniša Andrijašević by technical knockout in the quarter-finals when his opponent was not allowed continue on the advice of the doctor, and then faced Mirko Cro Cop at the semi-final stage. The bout was ruled a draw at the end of the regulation three rounds and so an extension round was added to decide the winner, after which Bajrami was given the nod by all three judges. Advancing to the finals, he faced another close fight against Lloyd van Dams but took a unanimous decision after an extra round once again to win the tournament and qualify for the 1999 K-1 World Grand Prix, the gathering of the world's sixteen best heavyweights. At the K-1 World Grand Prix '99 opening round in Osaka, Japan on October 5, 1999, Bajrami had his first of three meetings with Dutch legend Ernesto Hoost, losing by unanimous decision.

After going 1-1 in the first half of the year with a decision loss to Stefan Leko at K-1 The Millennium in Osaka on April 23, 2000 and a points win over Samir Benazzouz at K-1 Fight Night 2000 in Zurich on June 3, 2000, Bajrami was invited to compete in the K-1 Grand Prix Europe 2000 in Zagreb, Croatia on September 1, 2000. He was able to go past Belgian duo Peter Bamoshi and Marc de Wit, respectively, before being stopped with a devastating high kick by Jörgen Kruth in the final. Following the sudden passing of his trainer Andy Hug in August 2000, Bajrami relocated to the Netherlands to train under Peter Aerts and Rene Rooze at Chakuriki Gym. During his time training at Chakuriki, his karate-based style shifted to take on numerous Muay Thai techniques.

On March 3, 2001, he lost another decision to Ernesto Hoost at 2 Hot 2 Handle: Simply the Best in Amsterdam, Netherlands. Then, in another rematch, he bested Samir Benazzouz by decision for the second time at the K-1 World Grand Prix 2001 in Nagoya on July 20, 2001.

2002 was a quiet year for Bajrami as he competed just once under the K-1 banner, albeit taking three fights in one night at the K-1 World Grand Prix 2002 Preliminary Croatia on April 13 in Zagreb. After TKOing Dragan Jovanović at the quarter-final stage, he took a unanimous points victory over Siniša Pulyak in the semis. Going up against fellow Swiss-based karateka Petar Majstorović in the tournament final, Bajrami lost by decision after an extra round was needed to separate the pair.

Bajrami returned to tournament action on May 30, 2003 at the K-1 World Grand Prix 2003 in Basel. He avenged his loss to Jörgen Kruth by taking an extension round split decision over the Swede at the first round but was then eliminated by the eventual tournament winner Jerrel Venetiaan in the semis. He bounced back with a decision win over familiar foe Siniša Pulyak in Croatia on September 12, 2003.

On March 6, 2004, Bajrami was crowned the ISKA World Super Heavyweight (+96.4 kg/212 lb) Muay Thai Champion when he beat Australia's Peter Graham by decision in his birth city of Pristina, Kosovo. Returning to Japan for the first time in almost three years, Bajrami lost to Ernesto Hoost on points for the third time at the K-1 World Grand Prix 2004 in Saitama just twenty-one days later. Then, in what would be his last ever match in K-1, Bajrami took a unanimous decision victory over Martin Holm at the K-1 World Grand Prix 2004 in Nagoya on June 6, 2004.

=== Post K-1 (2005–2012) ===
Despite racking up thirteen victories in K-1, Bajrami's run in the promotion came to an end in 2004. On September 18, 2004, he lost to Vitali Akhramenko via decision after five rounds of fighting in Basel, Switzerland. He then went 1-1 in 2005 with a split decision win over James Phillips and a loss at the hands of Karl Glyschinsky.

Bajrami dropped a decision to Polish-Australian Muay Thai stylist Paul Slowinski in Switzerland on May 26, 2006, but followed it up with a third-round KO win over Tumelo Maphutha in South Africa five months later to set up a rematch with Slowinski on November 11, 2006 in Macau with the vacant WMC World Super Heavyweight (+95 kg/209.4 lb) Championship on the line this time. After a gruelling five round battle in which Bajrami sustained multiple gashes to the head, Slowinski was awarded the decision and walked away with the belt.

2007 was another mixed year for him. He knocked out Alessandro D'Ambrossio in the first round at the Night of Fighters 4 event in Bern, Switzerland but then dropped a decision to giant Russian Alexander Ustinov in Moscow a month later.

Bajrami fought Petar Majstorović for the second time on February 9, 2008 in Switzerland and got his own back on the Croatian, winning the decision after three rounds. He then TKO'd Dániel Török in November of that year in Sursee, Switzerland before finishing American Mike Shepherd with a highlight reel high kick on June 27, 2009 in the same city. He ended the year with a controversial defence of his ISKA world title on November 21, 2009 in Pristina, Kosovo against fellow K-1 veteran Freddy Kemayo. Kemayo was docked a point in the fourth round for a headbutt, and the judges scored the bout a split draw (50-48, 46-47, 48-48) after the final bell.

On December 18, 2010, Bajrami became a world champion for the second time with a third round low kick stoppage of Dawid Trólka in Zurich to take the WKN World Super Heavyweight (+96.6 kg/213 lb) Muay Thai belt.

In what is generally considered to be a biased hometown decision, Bajrami defended his ISKA strap against Indian challenger Singh Jaideep in Lucerne on July 2, 2011. He was floored by Jaideep in round one but received a long count and was able to recover.

He was then expected to make a return to K-1 and fight Daniel Ghiţă at the K-1 World Grand Prix 2011 in Nanjing Final 16 on October 29, 2011. However, the event was cancelled due to the promotion experiencing severe financial problems.

Bajrami made the third defence of his ISKA world title by knocking out Takenori Onda with a high kick in the fourth round of their contest in Lucerne on June 2, 2012. Since 2015 he is in a relationship with Rudina Magjistari.

== Championships and awards ==
=== Kickboxing ===
- K-1
  - K-1 Braves '99 Tournament Championship
  - K-1 Grand Prix Europe 2000 runner-up
  - K-1 World Grand Prix 2002 Preliminary Croatia runner-up
- International Sport Karate Association
  - ISKA World Super Heavyweight (+96.4 kg/212 lb) Muay Thai Championship
- World Kickboxing Network
  - WKN World Super Heavyweight (+96.6 kg/213 lb) Muay Thai Championship
- World Independent Promoters Union
  - W.I.P.U. 'King of the Ring' World Super Heavyweight Championship
- World Kickboxing Association
  - W.K.A. European Super Heavyweight Thai-boxing Championship

== Boxing record ==
Boxing record
3 wins (0 KOs), 0 losses, 0 draws
Date	Result	Opponent	Event	Location	Method	Round	Time	Record
2009-10-03	Win	(Hungary) Sandor Balogh		Emmenbrücke, Switzerland	Decision (unanimous)	6	3:00	3-0
2009-03-14	Win	(Romania) Alexandru Manea		Zurich, Switzerland	Decision (unanimous)	6	3:00	2-0
2001-09-25	Win	(South Africa) Samson Mahlangu		Cape Town, South Africa	Decision	4	3:00	1-0
Legend: Win Loss Draw/no contest Notes

== Kickboxing record ==
Kickboxing record
34 wins (19 KOs), 13 losses, 2 draws
Date	Result	Opponent	Event	Location	Method	Round	Time
2012-06-02	Win	(Japan) Takenori Onda		Lucerne, Switzerland	KO (left high kick)	4	
Retains the ISKA World Super Heavyweight (+96.4 kg/212 lb) Muay Thai Championship.
2011-07-02	Win	(India) Singh Jaideep	K-1 MAX Switzerland	Lucerne, Switzerland	Decision	5	3:00
Retains the ISKA World Super Heavyweight (+96.4 kg/212 lb) Muay Thai Championship.
2010-12-18	Win	(Poland) Dawid Trólka		Zurich, Switzerland	KO (right low kick)	3	
Wins the WKN World Super Heavyweight (+96.6 kg/213 lb) Muay Thai Championship.
2009-11-21	Draw	(France) Freddy Kemayo	K-1 Gladiators	Pristina, Kosovo	Draw	5	3:00
Retains the ISKA World Super Heavyweight (+96.5 kg/212 lb) Muay Thai Championship.
2009-06-27	Win	(United States) Mike Shepherd	K-1 Fight Night: ISKA World Championship	Sursee, Switzerland	KO (right high kick)	1	
2008-10-00	Win	(Hungary) Dániel Török	K-1 rules Fight Night 2008	Sursee, Switzerland	TKO		
2008-02-09	Win	(Switzerland) Petar Majstorović		Switzerland	Decision (unanimous)	3	3:00
2007-11-30	Loss	(Russia) Alexander Ustinov	Battle of Champions	Moscow, Russia	Decision	3	3:00
2007-10-27	Win	(Italy) Alessandro D'Ambrossio	Night of Fighters 4	Bern, Switzerland	KO	1	2:32
2006-11-11	Loss	(Australia) Paul Slowinski	Xplosion	Macau	Decision	5	3:00
For the WMC World Super Heavyweight (+95 kg/209 lb) Championship.
2006-10-14	Win	(South Africa) Tumelo Maphutha	Africa Bom-Ba-Ye	South Africa	KO (right low kick and punches)	3	
2006-05-26	Loss	(Australia) Paul Slowinski		Switzerland	Decision		
2005	Loss	(Germany) Karl Glyschinsky					
2005-05-07	Win	(Germany) James Phillips	Kickboxgala in Bern	Bern, Switzerland	Decision (split)	3	3:00
2004-09-18	Loss	(Belarus) Vitali Akhramenko	K-1 WKA Championships	Basel, Switzerland	Decision (unanimous)	5	3:00
2004-06-06	Win	(Sweden) Martin Holm	K-1 World Grand Prix 2004 in Nagoya	Nagoya, Japan	Decision (unanimous)	3	3:00
2004-03-27	Loss	(Netherlands) Ernesto Hoost	K-1 World Grand Prix 2004 in Saitama	Saitama, Japan	Decision (unanimous)	3	3:00
2004-03-06	Win	(Australia) Peter Graham	Kings of the Ring	Pristina, Kosovo	Decision	5	3:00
Wins the ISKA World Super Heavyweight (+96.4 kg/212 lb) Muay Thai Championship.
2003-09-12	Win	(Croatia) Siniša Pulyak	K-1 Final Fight	Croatia	Decision		
2003-05-30	Loss	(Netherlands) Jerrel Venetiaan	K-1 World Grand Prix 2003 in Basel, semi-finals	Basel, Switzerland	Extension round decision	4	3:00
2003-05-30	Win	(Sweden) Jörgen Kruth	K-1 World Grand Prix 2003 in Basel, quarter-finals	Basel, Switzerland	Extension round decision (split)	4	3:00
2002-04-13	Loss	(Croatia) Petar Majstorović	K-1 World Grand Prix 2002 Preliminary Croatia, Final	Zagreb, Croatia	Extension round decision (unanimous)	4	3:00
For the K-1 World Grand Prix 2002 Preliminary Croatia Championship.
2002-04-13	Win	(Croatia) Siniša Pulyak	K-1 World Grand Prix 2002 Preliminary Croatia, semi-finals	Zagreb, Croatia	Decision (unanimous)	3	3:00
2002-04-13	Win	(Serbia) Dragan Jovanović	K-1 World Grand Prix 2002 Preliminary Croatia, quarter-finals	Zagreb, Croatia	TKO	3	
2001-07-20	Win	(Morocco) Samir Benazzouz	K-1 World Grand Prix 2001 in Nagoya	Nagoya, Japan	Extension round decision (unanimous)	4	3:00
2001-03-18	Loss	(Netherlands) Ernesto Hoost	2 Hot 2 Handle: Simply the Best	Amsterdam, Netherlands	Decision	5	3:00
2000-09-01	Loss	(Sweden) Jörgen Kruth	K-1 Grand Prix Europe 2000, Final	Zagreb, Croatia	KO (high kick)	3	
For the K-1 Grand Prix Europe 2000 Championship.
2000-09-01	Win	(Belgium) Marc de Wit	K-1 Grand Prix Europe 2000, semi-finals	Zagreb, Croatia	Decision	3	3:00
2000-09-01	Win	(Belgium) Peter Bamoshi	K-1 Grand Prix Europe 2000, quarter-finals	Zagreb, Croatia	KO (kick)	1	
2000-06-03	Win	(Morocco) Samir Benazzouz	K-1 Fight Night 2000	Zurich, Switzerland	Decision (unanimous)	5	3:00
2000-04-23	Loss	(Germany) Stefan Leko	K-1 The Millennium	Osaka, Japan	Decision (unanimous)	3	3:00
1999-10-05	Loss	(Netherlands) Ernesto Hoost	K-1 World Grand Prix '99 opening round, First Round	Osaka, Japan	Decision (unanimous)	5	3:00
1999-06-20	Win	(Netherlands) Lloyd van Dams	K-1 Braves '99, Final	Fukuoka, Japan	Extension round decision (unanimous)	4	3:00
Wins the K-1 Braves '99 Tournament Championship.
1999-06-20	Win	(Croatia) Mirko Cro Cop	K-1 Braves '99, semi-finals	Fukuoka, Japan	Extension round decision (unanimous)	4	3:00
1999-06-20	Win	(Croatia) Siniša Andrijašević	K-1 Braves '99, quarter-finals	Fukuoka, Japan	TKO (doctor stoppage)	3	2:32
1999-06-05	Win	(South Africa) Carl Bernardo	K-1 Fight Night '99	Zurich, Switzerland	KO (kick)	1	1:57
1998-07-17	Draw	(England) Kirkwood Walker	K-1 Dream '98	Nagoya, Japan	Draw	5	3:00
1998-06-06	Loss	(Netherlands) Rob van Esdonk	K-1 Fight Night '98, semi-finals	Zurich, Switzerland	TKO (doctor stoppage)	1	2:49
1998-06-06	Win	(Italy) Matteo Minonzie	K-1 Fight Night '98, quarter-finals	Zurich, Switzerland	Extension round decision	4	3:00
1998-04-21	Win	(Switzerland) Cesar Blondel		Switzerland	Decision	3	
1998-03-12	Win	(Switzerland) Manuel Xhaka		Switzerland	Decision	3	
1998-02-01	Win	(Switzerland) Cesar Blondel		Switzerland	Decision	3	
Legend: Win Loss Draw/no contest Notes

== Notes ==
a.	Albanian spelling: Xhavit Bajrami, Serbo-Croat spelling: Džavit Bajrami, Џавит Бајрами.
