= Saskia van Rijswijk =

Dutch female Muay Thai champion and actress

- Born: Saskia Merk van Rijswijk; 1961; Amsterdam, Netherlands
- Style: Kickboxing
- Team: Chakuriki Gym
- Trainer: Thom Harinck

Other information
- Occupation: Hypnotherapist, mental coach, psychologist

Saskia Merk van Rijswijk (Amsterdam, 1961) is a Dutch Muay Thai champion and actress. Currently she works as a hypnotherapist, mental coach and psychologist.

== Biography ==
She started martial arts with full contact karate at the Chakuriki Gym in the Van Hallstraat in Amsterdam. While training at Chakuriki, her focus would shift to kickboxing and Muay Thai. In the 1980s she became Women's world champion in Muay Thai after beating a Thai female champion, Yupin Chotchai from Rayong Thailand, in the second round. In mid-1980s, she was in a relationship with the Chakuriki Gym head coach Thom Harinck. After four months in possession of the world title, she turned to things other than Muay Thai.

She would work as a contest jury in various different competitions in Japan, Australia, the Netherlands Antilles and the United States. She also engaged in dancing, singing and acting. She played a small role in the Dutch film Grijpstra & De Gier and danced in the Lido in Amsterdam and in the Fiesta Tropical Show with Los Alegres. She appeared in Playboy magazine in 1987.

In late 1980s, she began acting in movies. She played a leading role in the movie "Fatal Mission", in which she performed all the fight and stunt scenes herself.

In 1995, Saskia married Ted Merk. At the end of the 1990s, she presented "De Wedstrijd van de Week" (The Match of the Week) for RTL for a season, in which the matches from the World Wrestling Federation were broadcast.

Saskia van Rijswijk started teaching self-defense for women and youths. She developed sports programs for the judiciary and gave sports lessons to detainees at the nl:Huis van bewaring. She also did aerobics clinics (video made in 1987) and many martial arts demonstrations abroad.

At a later age she started studying psychology and now has been working for years as a psychologist, mental coach and hypnotherapist and for more than 20 years as an occupational reintegration consultant.

She has her own practice for Hypnotherapy, Psychology, Coaching and Training in Groet (Municipality of Bergen Noord-Holland) and works for organizations in the reintegration industry. In 2009, a special about Saskia was broadcast by TROS, in the program: "The most beautiful girl in the class".

== Films ==
Saskia van Rijswijk acted in the following movies:

- Final Run (1989)
- China White (film), also known as Deadly Sin (1989)
- Fatal Mission (1991)
