= Petar Majstorović =

Swiss karateka and kickboxer (born 1975)

- Born: February 5, 1975 (age 51)
- Nationality: Swiss
- Height: 1.84 m (6 ft 1/2 in)
- Weight: 91 kg (201 lb; 14.3 st)
- Division: Heavyweight
- Style: Seidokaikan Karate
- Fighting out of: Bern, Switzerland
- Team: Petars Gym
- Years active: 1996–2017

Kickboxing record
- Total: 93
- Wins: 71
- By knockout: 13
- Losses: 22
- By knockout: 3

Full contact karate record
- Total: 51
- Wins: 45
- Losses: 6

Petar Majstorovic (born 5 February 1975), is a Swiss karateka and kickboxer. He was a two-time World Kickboxing Network (W.K.N.) World Champion and two times K-1 preliminary tournaments champion in Croatia and Germany. He trained with Andy Hug from 1992 to 2000.

Majstorović's karate record is 45 wins and six losses out of 51 fights. His K-1 record is at 69 wins and 22 losses out of 90 fights. In 2009, he registered Petar Majstorovic K Gym as a private business in Bern.

== Titles ==
- 1996 Switzerland Seidokarate Open champion
- 1998 WKA European Kickboxing Heavyweight champion
- 2000 WKN Intercontinental Thai boxing champion
- 2001 K-1 World Grand Prix Preliminary Germany champion
- 2001 WKN World Kickboxing champion
- 2001 K-1 World Grand Prix Preliminary Germany Champion
- 2008 WPKC World Heavyweight champion +95 kg
- 2006 K-1 Fighting Network Prague Round '07 runner up
- 2003 K-1 Spain Grand Prix in Barcelona runner up
- 2002 K-1 World Grand Prix Preliminary Croatia champion
- 2008 WFCA World Super Heavyweight kickboxing champion
- 2013 Fight Night European Heavyweight kickboxing champion
- 2017 K-1 WGP Light Heavyweight Champion

== Kickboxing record ==
Kickboxing Record
71 Wins (13 (T)KO's, 57 decisions), 22 Losses, 2 Draw
Date	Result	Opponent	Event	Location	Method	Round	Time
2017-06-10	Win	(Switzerland) Janosch Nietlispach	K1 Andy Hug Memorial 2017	Switzerland	Ext. R. TKO	4	
Wins K-1 Light Heavyweight World Title
2016-06-18	Win	(Germany) Stefan Leko	Swiss Las Vegas Fusion 2016	Switzerland	TKO	2	
2013-11-02	Win	(Germany) Ibo Efe	FIGHT NIGHT BERN 2013	Urtenen-Schönbühl, Switzerland	KO	3	
2013-05-11	Win	(Switzerland) Patrick Schmid	Fight for Glory	Zollikofen, Switzerland	Decision	3	3:00
2009-03-14	Loss	(Netherlands) Rico Verhoeven	Oktagon presents: It's Showtime 2009	Milan, Italy	Decision	3	3:00
2008-11-15	Win	(Belgium) Frédéric Sinistra		Liège, Belgium	TKO	12	2:00
Wins W.F.C.A. World Super Heavyweight kickboxing title
2008-11-08	Loss	(Czech Republic) Tomáš Hron	Janus Fight Night "The Legend"	Padua, Italy	Decision	3	3:00
2008-02-09	Loss	(Albania) Xhavit Bajrami		Switzerland	Decision (unanimous)	3	3:00
2007-11-27	Win	(Turkey) Ergin Solmaz	Night of Fighters 4	Bern, Switzerland	KO	2	2:15
Wins WPKC World Heavyweight title
2007-09-07	Loss	(Russia) Magomed Magomedov	Noc bojovníkov	Bratislava, Slovakia	Decision	3	3:00
2007-08-19	Win	(Hungary) Tibor Nagy	K-1 Fighting Network Hungary 2007	Debrecen, Hungary	Decision	3	3:00
2007-05-04	Loss	(Curaçao) Errol Zimmerman	K-1 Fighting Network Romania 2007	Bucharest, Romania	Decision (Majority)	4	3:00
2007-03-10	Win	(Canada) Michael McDonald	K-1 Fighting Network Croatia 2007	Split, Croatia	TKO	5	3:00
2007-02-17	Win	(Italy) Luca Sabatini	Night of Fighters 3	Bern, Switzerland	TKO	5	0:20
2006-12-16	Loss	(Russia) Magomed Magomedov	K-1 Fighting Network Prague Round '07	Prague, Czech Republic	Decision	3	3:00
Fight was for K-1 Fighting Network Prague Round '07
2006-12-16	Win	(Portugal) Humberto Evora	K-1 Fighting Network Prague Round '07	Prague, Czech Republic	Decision	3	3:00
2006-12-16	Win	(Czech Republic) Daniel Jerling	K-1 Fighting Network Prague Round '07	Prague, Czech Republic	TKO	3	
2005-05-20	Loss	(Finland) Topi Helin	K-1 Scandinavia Grand Prix 2006	Stockholm, Sweden	Ext.R Decision (Split)	4	3:00
2005-05-06	Loss	(Belarus) Vitali Akhramenko	K-1 Slovakia 2005	Bratislava, Slovakia	Decision (Unanimous)	3	3:00
2005-01-20	Loss	(France) Brice Guidon	K-1 Fighting Network 2006 in Marseille	Marseille, France	Decision	3	3:00
2007-10-03	Win	(Netherlands) Lloyd van Dams	Fights at the Border IV	Lommel, Belgium	Decision	3	3:00
2005-05-27	Loss	(France) Gregory Tony	K-1 World Grand Prix 2005 in Paris	Paris, France	Decision (Unanimous)	3	3:00
2005-04-16	Loss	(Romania) Ionuţ Iftimoaie	K-1 Italy 2005 Oktagon	Milan, Italy	Decision	3	3:00
2004-12-18	Draw	(Belarus) Sergei Gur	K-1 MAX Spain 2004	Guadalajara, Spain	Decision	3	3:00
2004-09-18	Loss	(South Africa) Mike Bernardo	K-1 W.K.A. Championships	Basel, Switzerland	Decision	5	3:00
Fight was for W.K.A. Muay Thai Super Heavyweight World title.
2004-05-30	Loss	(Brazil) Ewerton Teixeira	Kyokushin vs K-1 2004 All Out Battle	Tokyo, Japan	Decision (Unanimous)	3	3:00
2004-04-24	Draw	(Belarus) Sergei Gur	K-1 Italy 2004	Milan, Italy	Decision	3	3:00
2004-3-27	Win	(Switzerland) Azem Maksutaj	Fight Night Winterthurn	Switzerland	Decision	5	
2003-12-20	Loss	(Russia) Alexander Ustinov	K-1 Spain Grand Prix 2003 in Barcelona	Barcelona, Spain	KO	3	2:28
Fight was for K-1 Spain Grand Prix 2003 in Barcelona
2003-12-20	Win	(France) Cyrille Diabate	K-1 Spain Grand Prix 2003 in Barcelona	Barcelona, Spain	Decision (Unanimous)	3	3:00
2003-12-20	Win	(Spain) Jordi Ramis	K-1 Spain Grand Prix 2003 in Barcelona	Barcelona, Spain	KO	2	1:14
2003-09-12	Loss	(Croatia) Siniša Andrijašević	K-1 Final Fight	Split, Croatia	Decision (Split)	5	3:00
2003-05-20	Loss	(Netherlands) Jerrel Venetiaan	K-1 World Grand Prix 2003 in Basel	Basel, Switzerland	Decision	3	3:00
2003-03-15	Loss	(Sweden) Martin Holm	K-1 World Grand Prix 2003 Preliminary Scandinavia	Stockholm, Sweden	Decision	3	3:00
2002-05-25	Loss	(Netherlands) Remy Bonjasky	K-1 World Grand Prix 2002 in Paris	Paris, France	KO (Kick)	4	0:27
2002-04-13	Win	(Albania) Xhavit Bajrami	K-1 World Grand Prix 2002 Preliminary Croatia	Zagreb, Croatia	Ext R. Decision (Majority)	4	3:00
Wins K-1 World Grand Prix 2002 Preliminary Croatia
2002-04-13	Win	(Croatia) Sinisa Andrijasevic	K-1 World Grand Prix 2002 Preliminary Croatia	Zagreb, Croatia	Injury		
2002-04-13	Win	(Turkey) Ergin Solmaz	K-1 World Grand Prix 2002 Preliminary Croatia	Zagreb, Croatia	KO	2	
2001-07-01	Loss	(Belarus) Alexey Ignashov	K-1 World Grand Prix 2001 in Nagoya	Nagoya, Japan	Decision (Unanimous)	3	3:00
2001-05-20	Win	(Hungary) Attila Fusko	K-1 World Grand Prix 2001 Preliminary Germany	Oberhausen, Germany	TKO	1	0:40
Wins K-1 World Grand Prix 2001 Preliminary Germany
2001-05-20	Win	(Greece) Dimitri Alexudis	K-1 World Grand Prix 2001 Preliminary Germany	Oberhausen, Germany	KO	1	2:38
2001-05-20	Win	(Germany) Florian Ogunade	K-1 World Grand Prix 2001 Preliminary Germany	Oberhausen, Germany	TKO	3	1:48
1999-06-05	Loss	(France) Cyril Abidi	K-1 Fight Night '99	Zurich, Switzerland	Decision (Unanimous)	5	3:00
1999-2-27	Win	(Albania) Xahvit Bajrami	Fight Night Wohlen	Switzerland			
1998-06-06	Loss	(Germany) Stefan Leko	K-1 Fight Night '98 Quarter Finals	Zurich, Switzerland	Ext.R Decision	4	3:00
1997-03-16	Loss	(New Zealand) Ray Sefo	K-1 Kings '97	Yokohama, Japan	TKO (Referee Stoppage)	4	1:36
1996-06-02	Win	(Japan) Shingo Koyashu	K-1 Fight Night II	Zurich, Switzerland	Decision (Unanimous)	3	3:00
Legend: Win Loss Draw/No contest Notes

== Doping suspension ==
In 2004, Majstorović was suspended for 2 years for his refusal to submit a sample at a kickboxing event in Switzerland.

== See also ==
- Seidokaikan
- List of K-1 events
- List of male kickboxers
