= Lloyd van Dams =

Dutch–Surinamese kickboxer (1972–2021)

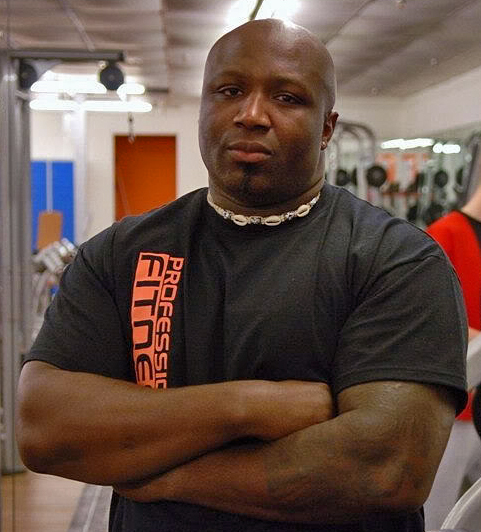
- Born: Lloyd Daniël van Dams; 5 March 1972; Para District, Suriname
- Died: 29 December 2021 (aged 49); Utrecht, The Netherlands
- Other names: The Tornado
- Height: 1.86 m (6 ft 1 in)
- Weight: 120.5 kg (266 lb; 18.98 st)
- Division: Super Heavyweight
- Style: Muay Thai
- Stance: Orthodox
- Team: FC Van Dams (2006-2021); Chakuriki Gym (1996-2006); Survivor (1992-1996); SWSU (1984-1992)
- Trainer: Thom Harinck; Jan Vleesenbeek
- Years active: 1991–2010

Kickboxing record
- Total: 84
- Wins: 69
- By knockout: 34
- Losses: 12
- By knockout: 1
- Draws: 3

Mixed martial arts record
- Total: 1
- Wins: 0
- Losses: 1
- By knockout: 1

Other information
- Occupation: Gym owner, trainer
- Website: http://fcvandams.com/
- Mixed martial arts record from Sherdog
- Last updated on: February 27, 2010

Lloyd Daniël van Dams (5 March 1972 – 29 December 2021), also known as The Tornado, was a Surinamese-born Dutch heavyweight kickboxer. He was a Dutch, European, and World Muay Thai champion. Known for his durability, Van Dams was never knocked out in 84 professional fights (though he was defeated once via TKO from exhaustion). He held notable wins over Remy Bonjasky, Brian Douwes, Alexander Ustinov, Bjorn Bregy, and Brecht Wallis. Van Dams also competed in mixed martial arts.

== Life and career ==
Van Dams was born in Suriname on 5 March 1972, and moved to the Netherlands when he was seven years old. He began training kickboxing when he was 12 at SWSU, a Surinamese-Dutch gym in Utrecht. When he was good enough, his trainer decided to take him to Chakuriki. Van Dams had his first professional fight at the age of 18.

When he was 20 he moved from Utrecht to Dordrecht and began training with Jan Vleesenbeek. This trainer was known for his hard training methods, which suited Van Dams very well. When Vleesenbeek decided to stop training, Van Dams moved to a gym called "Survivor" in Breda.

When facing problems in his personal life in 1996, Van Dams moved back to Utrecht. He went training at Chakuriki Gym in Amsterdam, under Thom Harinck and developed himself as one of the top fighters of the gym.

In 1999, he made his K-1 debut at the K-1 Braves '99. After beating Matt Skelton in the semi-finals he lost to Xhavit Bajrami at the finals. After a few years, Van Dams made his comeback in 2005. First he fought at an 8-man tourney "Fight at the Border" in Belgium, where he lost on his comeback to Petar Majstorovic by unanimous decision. A week later he won a 4-man tournament in Romania. He defeated Pavel Majer and Alben Belinski.

In 2006, Van Dams opened his own gym, Fight Club Van Dams in Utrecht, Netherlands. He died from heart disease on 29 December 2021, at the age of 49.

== Titles ==
- 2010 Amsterdam Fight Club 4 man tournament champion
- 2004 King Of The Ring World GP tournament champion
- 2001 K-1 World Grand Prix in Fukuoka Repechage A Runner Up
- 2000 WFCA World champion
- 1999 WMTA World champion
- 1998 EMTA European champion
- 1998 KO-Power Tournament champion
- 1997 Battle of the Best tournament champion
- 1996 NKBB Dutch champion

== Kickboxing record ==
Kickboxing Record
69 Wins (34 (T)KO's, 35 decisions), 12 Losses, 3 Draws
Date	Result	Opponent	Event	Location	Method	Round	Time
2010-02-27	Win	(Curaçao) Benjey Zimmerman	Amsterdam Fightclub: Rotterdam vs Amsterdam	Amsterdam, Netherlands	Decision (unanimous)	3	3:00
Wins Amsterdam Fightclub 4 man tournament title
2010-02-27	Win	(Netherlands) Brian Douwes	Amsterdam Fightclub: Rotterdam vs Amsterdam	Amsterdam, Netherlands	Decision (unanimous)	3	3:00
2009-05-31	Draw	(Brazil) Anderson Silva	Next Generation Warriors 3	Utrecht, Netherlands	Decision draw	3	3:00
2008-12-29	Win	(United States) Ron Ritter	The Return of the Boys	Paramaribo, Suriname	KO (low kicks)	1	
2008-11-23	Win	(Morocco) Samir Benazzouz	RingSensation	The Hague, Netherlands	Decision (unanimous)	3	3:00
2007-08-11	Win	(Japan) Ryuta Noji	Heat4	Nagoya, Japan	Decision (unanimous)	3	3:00
2006-12-16	Draw	(Sweden) Wisam Feyli	Travelfight Arena	Uppsala, Sweden	Decision draw	3	3:00
2006-10-08	Loss	(Russia) Alexander Ustinov	The Battle of Arnhem V	Arnhem, Netherlands	Decision (unanimous)	5	3:00
Fight was for WFCA World Thaiboxing Super Heavyweight (+100 kg) title
2006-05-13	Loss	(Netherlands) Semmy Schilt	K-1 World Grand Prix 2006 in Amsterdam	Amsterdam, Netherlands	Decision (unanimous)	3	3:00
2006-03-26	Win	(Belgium) Brecht Wallis	Balans Fight Night	Tilburg, Netherlands	Decision (unanimous)	3	3:00
2005-12-18	Win	(Bulgaria) Alben Belinski	Local Kombat 18 "Revanşa" Final	Constanta, Romania	Decision (unanimous)	3	3:00
Wins Local Kombat 18 tournament title
2005-12-18	Win	(Czech Republic) Pavel Majer	Local Kombat 18 "Revanşa" Semifinal	Constanta, Romania	Decision (unanimous)	3	3:00
2005-12-10	Loss	(Croatia) Petar Majstorovic	Fights at the Border IV, quarter finals	Lommel, Belgium	Decision (unanimous)	3	3:00
2005-04-30	Win	(Belgium) Achmed Jattari	Queens Fight Night	Eindhoven, Netherlands			
2004-12-10	Win	(Serbia) Nenad Nedimovic	Local Kombat 11: Intepeneste Valcea	Râmnicu Vâlcea, Romania	KO	2	
2004-05-29	Win	(Netherlands) Jerrel Venetiaan	King of the Ring World GP, Final	Venice, Italy	Decision (unanimous)	3	3:00
Wins King of the Ring World Grand Prix tournament title
2004-05-29	Win	(Russia) Alexander Ustinov	King of the Ring World GP, semi final	Venice, Italy	Decision (split)	3	3:00
2004-05-29	Win	(Czech Republic) Robert Byceck	King of the Ring World GP, quarter final	Venice, Italy	KO (left low kick)	1	1:03
2003-05-31	Win	(France) Ait Daouda	Muay Thai Express 1	Rotterdam, Netherlands	TKO (corner stoppage)	3	
2002-10-31	Win	(United States) Mike Vieira	The Return of Hallows Eve	Miami Beach	KO (low kicks)	3	2:02
2002-08-10	Loss	(Russia) Lechi Kurbanov	8.10 ICHIGEKI	Tokyo, Japan	Decision (unanimous)	3	3:00
2002-07-07	Win	(England) Sean Johnson	Bad Boys Day part 1	Utrecht, Netherlands	TKO (low kicks)	1	
2001-10-08	Loss	(Brazil) Francisco Filho	K-1 World Grand Prix 2001 in Fukuoka	Fukuoka, Japan	Decision (majority)	3	3:00
2001-10-08	Win	(England) Matt Skelton	K-1 World Grand Prix 2001 in Fukuoka	Fukuoka, Japan	Decision (unanimous)	3	3:00
2001-07-20	Loss	(Belarus) Alexey Ignashov	K-1 World Grand Prix 2001 in Nagoya, Final	Nagoya, Japan	Ext. R Decision (unanimous)	4	3:00
Fight was for K-1 World Grand Prix 2001 in Nagoya tournament title
2001-07-20	Loss	(South Africa) Mike Bernardo	K-1 World Grand Prix 2001 in Nagoya, semi final	Nagoya, Japan	Ext. R decision (majority)	4	3:00
2001-07-20	Win	(Switzerland) Bjorn Bregy	K-1 World Grand Prix 2001 in Nagoya, quarter final	Nagoya, Japan	Decision (unanimous)	3	3:00
2001-04-15	Win	(Japan) Tooru Oishi	K-1 Burning 2001	Kumamoto, Japan	Decision (unanimous)	5	3:00
2000-12-12	Loss	(Belarus) Alexey Ignashov	It's Showtime - Christmas Edition	Haarlem, Netherlands	TKO (Exhaustion)	5	3:00
2000-10-08	Win	(Netherlands) Peter Verschuren	Victory or Hell part I	Amsterdam, Netherlands	TKO (ref stop/Three knockdowns)	3	
2000-07-30	Loss	(Netherlands) Ernesto Hoost	K-1 World Grand Prix 2000 in Nagoya, semi final	Nagoya, Japan	Decision (majority)	3	3:00
2000-07-30	Win	(Japan) Tatsufumi Tomihira	K-1 World Grand Prix 2000 in Nagoya, quarter final	Nagoya, Japan	KO	2	2:07
2000-04-23	Win	(Morocco) Samir Benazzouz	K-1 The Millennium	Osaka, Japan	Decision (unanimous)	3	3:00
1999-10-21	Win	(Netherlands) Rene Rooze		Haarlem, Netherlands	Decision (unanimous)	3	3:00
1999-10-05	Loss	(Netherlands) Peter Aerts	K-1 World Grand Prix '99 opening round	Osaka, Japan	Decision (unanimous)	5	3:00
Fails to qualify for the K-1 World Grand Prix 1999 final.
1999-06-20	Loss	(Albania) Xhavit Bajrami	K-1 Braves '99, Final	Japan	Ext R decision (unanimous)	4	3:00
Fight was for K-1 Braves '99 tournament title
1999-06-20	Win	(England) Matt Skelton	K-1 Braves '99, semi final	Japan	Ext R decision (unanimous)	4	3:00
1999-06-20	Win	(Poland) Tomasz Kucharzewski	K-1 Braves '99, quarter final	Japan	KO (right low kick)	2	1:48
1999-03-27	Win	(Netherlands) Bob Schreiber	The Fight of the Gladiators	Amsterdam, Netherlands	Decision (unanimous)	5	3:00
Wins WMTA Super Heavyweight Muaythai World title
1998-09-26	Win	(Netherlands) William van Rosmalen	The Fight of the Champions	Amsterdam, Netherlands	Decision (unanimous)	5	3:00
Wins EMTA Super Heavyweight Muaythai European title
1998-05-31	Win	(Netherlands) Bob Schreiber	Fight of the Decade	Amsterdam, Netherlands	TKO (corner stoppage)	4	
1998-04-14	Win	(Netherlands) Remy Bonjasky	Muay Thai Power tournament, Final	Amsterdam, Netherlands	Decision (unanimous)	3	3:00
Wins Muay Thai Power tournament title
1998-04-14	Win	(Netherlands) Peter Kramer	Muay Thai Power tournament, semi final	Amsterdam, Netherlands	Decision (unanimous)	3	3:00
1998-02-15	Win	(Netherlands) Richard Paans	Thai/Kickboxing in Nijmegen	Nijmegen, Netherlands	KO	1	
1997-11-27	Loss	(Netherlands) Peter Verschuren	Thaiboxing in Amsterdam	Amsterdam, Netherlands	Decision (unanimous)	5	3:00
1997-05-11	Win	(Brazil) Pedro Rizzo	Battle of the Best tournament, Final	Den Bosch, Netherlands	TKO (corner stoppage)	2	
Wins Battle of the Best tournament title
1997-05-11	Win	(Netherlands) Perry Telgt	Battle of the Best tournament, semi final	Den Bosch, Netherlands	Decision (unanimous)	3	3:00
1997-05-11	Win	(Netherlands) Peter Verschuren	Battle of the Best tournament, quarter final	Den Bosch, Netherlands	KO	1	

== Mixed martial arts record ==
Res.	Record	Opponent	Method	Event	Date	Round	Time	Location	Notes
Loss	0-1	(Trinidad and Tobago) Gary Goodridge	TKO (punches)	Pride Shockwave	31 December 2005	1	3:39	Tokyo, Japan	

== See also ==
- List of male kickboxers
- List of K-1 events
