= Turpal Tokaev =

Russian kickboxer (born 1984)

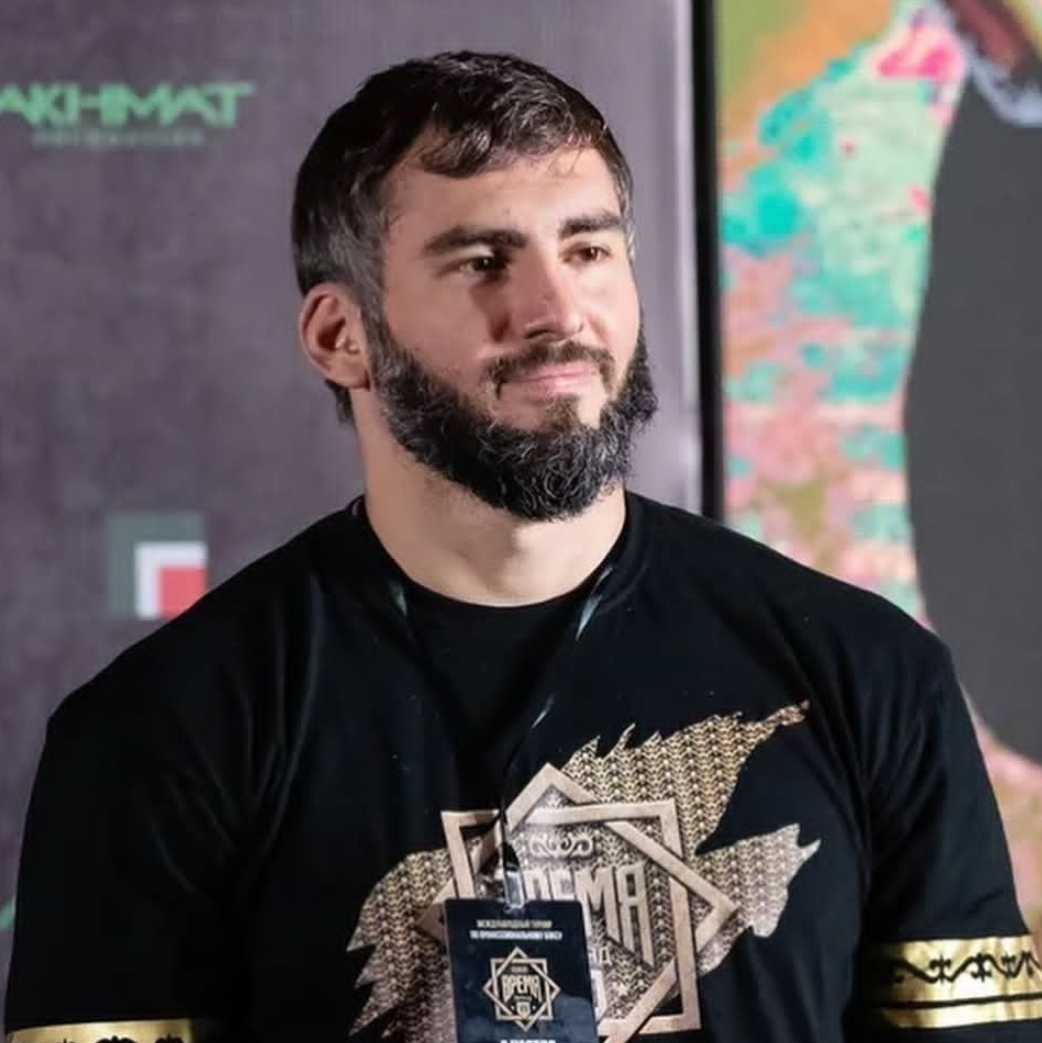
- Born: Theodore Sariyev; November 20, 1984 (age 41); Grozny, Russia
- Nationality: Chechen
- Height: 1.88 m (6 ft 2 in)
- Weight: 96 kg (212 lb; 15 st 2 lb)
- Division: Heavyweight
- Style: Muay Thai
- Stance: Orthodox
- Fighting out of: Grozny, Russia
- Team: WMC Camp Lamai Gym

Kickboxing record
- Total: 31
- Wins: 25
- By knockout: 17
- Losses: 6

Turpal Tokaev (born 20 November 1984) is a Russian kickboxer and actor of Chechen descent. Also known as Bahadir Sari and Theodore Sariyev, ISKA oriental kickboxing rules heavyweight world champion in 2010.

== Biography and career ==
He was Kazakhstan captain of national Muay Thai team, winning medals at practically all the competitions he participated. He fought for Kazakhstan under the name of Teodor Sariyev. He fought for Turkey under the name of Bahadir Sari. He is now fighting and living in Russia under the name of Turpal Tokaev.

== Titles ==
- 2018 WKF Superheavyweight World Champion (+96.5 kg) Champion
- 2017 Tatneft Arena World Cup 2017 (+80 kg) Champion
- 2010 ISKA Oriental Rules Heavyweight World Champion -96.4 kg
- 2009 ISKA Oriental Rules Heavyweight Turkish Champion
- 2009 WKN World Grand Prix Turkey Tournament Champion
- 2006 WMC King's Cup Champion
- 2006 IFMA World Championship Runner Up
- Championship of Kazakhstan 2005, 2006
- International Tournament for President Cup Kazakhstan 2005, 2006

== Professional kickboxing record ==
Kickboxing Record
25 Wins, 6 Losses
Date	Result	Opponent	Event	Location	Method	Round	Time
2018-08-16	Win	(Poland) Mateusz Duczmal	Akhmat Fight Show	Grozny, Russia	Decision (Unanimous)	5	3:00
Wins WKF Superheavyweight World Title (+96.5 Kg) title.
2017-12-14	Win	(Belarus) Petr Romankevich	Tatneft Cup 2017 - Final	Kazan, Russia	Decision (Unanimous)	4	3:00
Wins Tatneft Arena World Cup 2017 (+80 kg) title.
2017-10-27	Win	(Poland) Dawid Żółtaszek	Tatneft Cup 2017 - Semi finals	Kazan, Russia	TKO (Right low kick)	3	
2017-07-20	Win	(Netherlands) Tomislav Malenica	Tatneft Cup 2017 - 1st selection 1/4 final	Kazan, Russia	TKO (Strikes)	3	
2017-06-23	Win	(Portugal) Bruno Susano	Akhmat Fight Show	Grozny, Russia	TKO (Strikes)	2	
2017-04-22	Win	(Lithuania) Mantas Rimdeika	Tatneft Cup 2017 - 2nd selection 1/8 final	Kazan, Russia	TKO (Low kicks)	4	
2017-02-18	Win	(France) Abdarhmane Coulibaly	W5 Grand Prix Kitek XXXIX	Moscow, Russia	TKO (referee stoppage)	3	
2016-08-23	Win	(Belarus) Sergei Gur	Akhmat Fight Show	Grozny, Russia	KO	2	
2015-05-29	Loss	(Cameroon) Daniel Lentie	Tatneft Cup 2015 2nd selection 1/4 final	Kazan, Russia	Decision	4	3:00
2015-04-25	Win	(United States) Antonio Dvorak	Absolute Championship Berkut 17	Grozny, Russia	KO	2	
2014-12-07	Win	(Azerbaijan) Farid Shabanov	Tatneft Cup 2015 1st selection 1/8 final	Kazan, Russia	TKO	1	
2014-03-07	Win	(Greece) Giannis Stoforidis	AKIN Dövüş Arenası KickBoxing Event	Turkey	Decision	3	3:00
2014-01-31	Loss	(Poland) Tomasz Sarara	Tatneft Cup 2014 – 2nd selection 1/8 final	Kazan, Russia	Ext. R. Decision (Unanimous)	4	3:00
2012-12-01	Win	(Lithuania) Mantas Rimdeika	Tatneft Cup 2013 - 2nd selection 1/8 final	Kazan, Russia	KO	1	
2010-12-19	Win	(Estonia) Daniil Sapljoshin	Tatneft Cup 2011 1st selection 1/8 final	Kazan, Russia	KO (Right hook)	1	
2010-08-14	Loss	(Iran) Ekber Şekbi	Ergen Ring Ateşi -13	Van, Turkey			
2010-01-10	Win	(Suriname) Eric Sauer		Adana, Turkey	KO	2	
Wins ISKA Oriental Rules Heavyweight World Championship.
2009-12-26	Win	(Serbia) Goran Vidaković	Ergen Ring Ateşi 11	Erzurum, Turkey	TKO	1	
2009-09-10	Win	(Turkey) Erhan Deniz		Istanbul, Turkey	Decision	5	3:00
Wins ISKA Oriental Rules Heavyweight Turkish Championship.
2009-08-22	Win	(Azerbaijan) Zamig Athakishiyev	Ergen Ring Ateşi 8, Final	Istanbul, Turkey	KO (Low Kick)	2	
Wins WKN World Grand Prix Turkey Tournament Title.
2009-08-22	Win	(Iran) Sait Ali Muhammed	Ergen Ring Ateşi 8, Semi Finals	Istanbul, Turkey	KO	2	
2009-08-01	Win	(Azerbaijan) Zamig Athakishiyev	Ergen Ring Ateşi 7	Ankara, Turkey			
2009-07	Win	(Suriname) Redouan Cairo		Istanbul, Turkey	KO (Left hook)	2	
2009-06	Win	(Netherlands) Raoul Dennen		Turkey	TKO	1	
2008-04	Win	(Angola) Henriques Zowa	World Champions League	Turkey	Decision	5	3:00
2007-10-14	Loss	(Germany) Stefan Leko	Kickboks Gala Istanbul	Istanbul, Turkey	Decision (Unanimous)	3	3:00
2007-05-19	Loss	(Australia) Nathan Corbett	K-1 Scandinavia GP 2007	Stockholm, Sweden	Decision (Unanimous)	3	3:00
2007-05-19	Win	(Russia) Ramazan Ramazanov	K-1 Scandinavia GP 2007	Stockholm, Sweden	KO (Right hook)	2	0:57
2006-12-06	Win	(Italy) Vanni Faè	Kings Birthday Event	Bangkok, Thailand			
Wins WMC King's Cup Championship.
2006-11-14	Win	(United States) Christian Walker	Phuket Promotion	Phuket, Thailand			
2005-05-12	Loss	(Russia) Magomed Magomedov	WMC-S1 Super Fights Program	Bangkok, Thailand	Decision (Majority)	5	3:00
Legend: Win Loss Draw/No contest Notes

== Filmography ==
=== Film ===
Year	Film	Role	Notes
2011	Kara Murat: Mora'nin atesi		

== See also ==
- List of male kickboxers
