= Vitali Akhramenko =

Belarusian kickboxer

- Born: Vitali Akhramenko; November 22, 1977 (age 48); Minsk, Byelorussian SSR, Soviet Union
- Native name: Виталий Ахраменко
- Other names: Screw (Винт)
- Nationality: (Belarus) Belarusian
- Height: 1.90 m (6 ft 3 in)
- Weight: 97.0 kg (213.8 lb; 15.27 st)
- Division: Super Middleweight; Light Heavyweight; Cruiserweight; Heavyweight
- Style: Muay Thai
- Stance: Southpaw
- Team: Chinuk Gym (1996–2013)
- Trainer: Andrei Gridin
- Years active: 1996–2005; 2009–present

Kickboxing record
- Total: 54
- Wins: 44
- By knockout: 18
- Losses: 9
- By knockout: 3
- Draws: 1
- Last updated on: August 5, 2013

Vitali Akhramenko (Belarusian: Віталь Ахраменка; born November 22, 1977) is a Belarusian Heavyweight kickboxer and a former World Muay Thai champion. He is trained by Andrei Gridin and is fighting out of Chinuk Gym, Minsk, Belarus. He made his K-1 debut in 2001 at K-1 Czech Grand Prix 2001 in Prague against Takeru.

== Biography and career ==
Akhramenko had a successful amateur career, winning three world and European titles in thaiboxing. On November 2, 1998, he won a gold medal at European Open Muaythai Championships in Kyiv, Ukraine. After making his K-1 debut in 2001 he fought on various K-1 tournaments in Europe. He also works as a trainer at Chinuk Gym and is the sparring partner of Zabit Samedov

In July 2006 Akhramenko was sentenced to jail for attempted armed robbery. He was on parole for previous convictions of beating a police officer and possession of drugs.

On September 6, 2009, Akhramenko made his return to the ring after completing a three-year jail sentence. He won the fight against Evgeny Makarov by unanimous decision.

On November 26, 2011, he won the 2011 Fight Code Dragons Tournament by beating Freddy Kemayo in the final.

After a year out of the ring, Akhramenko was scheduled to face Elvin Abbasov at Mustang Knockout Fight Night in Minsk on November 18, 2012. Fight never happened for unknown reasons.

He fought Jérôme Le Banner for the W.K.N. Kickboxing Oriental World Super Heavyweight title at Fight Night Saint-Tropez in Saint-Tropez, France on August 5, 2013, losing by KO in round two.

== Titles ==
Professional

- 2011 Fight Code Rhinos Tournament Champion
- 2010 Tatneft Arena World Cup 2010 champion +80 kg
- 2004 K-1 Italy Grand Prix 2004 in Milan tournament runner up
- 2003 Cup of Arbat Tournament champion -91 kg
- 2003 Belarusian Muaythai champion
- 2002 Belarusian Muaythai champion

Amateur

- 1999 W.A.K.O. World Championships in Caorle, Italy (gold) -75 kg (Thai-boxing)
- 1998 European Open Muaythai Championships (gold) -75 kg

== Kickboxing record ==
Kickboxing record
44 wins (18 (T)KOs, 27 decisions), 9 losses, 1 draw
Date	Result	Opponent	Event	Location	Method	Round	Time
2013-08-04	Loss	(France) Jérôme Le Banner	Fight Night Saint Tropez	Saint-Tropez, France	TKO (ref. stop/right low kick)	2	
Fight was for W.K.N. Kickboxing OR World Super Heavyweight title (+96.600 kg).
2011-11-26	Win	(France) Freddy Kemayo	Fight Code: Rhinos Series, Finals	Geneva, Switzerland	Decision (unanimous)	3	3:00
Wins 2011 Fight Code Rhinos Tournament.
2011-11-26	Win	(France) Pacome Assi	Fight Code: Rhinos Series, Semi Finals	Geneva, Switzerland	Decision (unanimous)	3	3:00
2011-10-22	Win	(Azerbaijan) Zamig Athakishiyev	Fight Code: Rhinos Series, Quarter Finals	Moscow, Russia	Decision (unanimous)	3	3:00
2011-08-13	Win	(Croatia) Ivan Stanić	Fight Code: Rhinos Series, Final 16 (Part 3), Super Fight	Debrecen, Hungary	Decision	3	3:00
2011-05-01	Win	(Hungary) Gyorgy Mihalik	Fight Code: Dragons Round 3	Budapest, Hungary	Decision (unanimous)	3	3:00
2011-02-05	Win	(Slovakia) Tomas Kohout	Fight Code: Rhinos Series, Final 16 (Part 1)	Nitra, Slovakia	Decision	3	3:00
2010-10-22	Win	(Suriname) Ashwin Balrak	Tatneft Arena World Cup 2010 final (+80 kg)	Kazan, Russia	Decision (unanimous)	5	3:00
Wins Tatneft Arena World Cup 2010 (+80 kg) title.
2010-07-29	Win	(Russia) Ramazan Ramazanov	Tatneft Arena World Cup 2010 1/2 final (+80 kg)	Kazan, Russia	Decision (unanimous)	4	3:00
2010-05-13	Win	(Russia) Alexander Vezhevatov	Tatneft Arena World Cup 2010 1/4 final (+80 kg)	Kazan, Russia	Ext.R KO (left high kick)	4	2:57
2010-04-11	Win	(Belarus) Evgeny Makarov	Fight Club "The Octopus"	Minsk, Belarus	TKO (ref. stop./punches)	3	
2010-03-05	Win	(Croatia) Dino Čatipović	Tatneft Arena World Cup 2010 1/8 final (+80 kg)	Kazan, Russia	KO (left punch)	1	2:16
2009-12-13	Win	(Moldova) Sergey Doni	Fight Club "The Octopus"	Minsk, Belarus	Decision (unanimous)	3	3:00
2009-09-06	Win	(Belarus) Evgeny Makarov	Imperial Thaiboxing Tournament	Minsk, Belarus	Decision (unanimous)	3	3:00
2005-06-12	Loss	(Netherlands) Gökhan Saki	It's Showtime 2005 Amsterdam	Amsterdam, Netherlands	KO (left low kick)	4	0:45
2005-05-06	Win	(Croatia) Petar Majstorovic	K-1 Slovakia 2005	Bratislava, Slovakia	Decision (unanimous)	3	3:00
2005-04-16	Loss	(Morocco) Badr Hari	K-1 Italy 2005 Oktagon	Milan, Italy	Decision (unanimous)	3	3:00
2005-03-12	Loss	(France) Gregory Tony		France	Decision (unanimous)	3	3:00
2004-12-19	Win	(Croatia) Mladen Brestovac	Heaven or Hell 5	Prague, Czech Republic	Decision (unanimous)	3	3:00
2004-10-30	Win	(France) Christophe Caron	Noc Bojovníkov	Bratislava, Slovakia	KO (low kicks)	1	0:30
2004-10-25	Win	(Hungary) Tihamer Brunner	Heaven or Hell 4	Prague, Czech Republic	Decision (unanimous)	3	3:00
2004-09-18	Win	(Albania) Xhavit Bajrami	K-1 WKA Championships	Basel, Switzerland	Decision (unanimous)	5	3:00
2004-04-24	Loss	(Sweden) Jorgen Kruth	K-1 Italy Grand Prix 2004 in Milan	Milan, Italy	Decision (unanimous)	3	3:00
Fight was for K-1 Italy GP 2004 in Milan tournament title.
2004-04-24	Win	(France) Freddy Kemayo	K-1 Italy Grand Prix 2004 in Milan	Milan, Italy	Decision (majority)	3	3:00
2004-04-24	Win	(Croatia) Ante Varnica	K-1 Italy Grand Prix 2004 in Milan	Milan, Italy	Decision (unanimous)	3	3:00
2003-10-31	Win	(United States) Dewey Cooper	K-1 Final Fight Stars War in Zagreb	Zagreb, Croatia	Decision (unanimous)	5	3:00
2003-06-14	Loss	(France) Jerome Le Banner	K-1 World Grand Prix 2003 in Paris	Paris, France	KO (right punch)	2	0:28
2003-04-16	Win	(Belarus) Sergei Gur	Cup of Arbat Tournament Finals (-93 kg)	Moscow, Russia	Decision (unanimous)	5	3:00
Wins Cup of Arbat Tournament (-93 kg) title.
2003-04-09	Win	(Ukraine) Andrei Kindrich	Cup of Arbat Tournament 1/2 finals (-93 kg)	Moscow, Russia	Decision (unanimous)	4	3:00
2003-04-02	Win	(Kazakhstan) Bislan Dokayev	Cup of Arbat Tournament 1/4 finals (-93 kg)	Moscow, Russia	TKO (corner stop./towel)	2	3:00
2003-03-15	Loss	(Sweden) Jorgen Kruth	K-1 World Grand Prix 2003 Preliminary Scandinavia	Stockholm, Sweden	Decision (unanimous)	5	3:00
2002-04-13	Draw	(Albania) Azem Maksutaj	K-1 Croatia Grand Prix 2002	Zagreb, Croatia	Decision draw	5	3:00
2001-12-01	Win	(Japan) Takeru	K-1 Czech Grand Prix 2001 in Prague	Prague, Czech Republic	Decision (unanimous)	5	3:00
2000-10-22	Loss	(Netherlands) Perry Ubeda	It's Showtime - Exclusive	Haarlem, Netherlands	Decision (unanimous)	5	3:00
2000-03-13	Win	(Netherlands)	Boxing Club "Reaktor"	Minsk, Belarus	KO	1	
1999-11-28	Win	(Russia) Andrei Kamilov	W.A.K.O. World Championships 1999	Caorle, Italy	Decision	4	2:00
Wins WAKO World Kickboxing Championships (-75 kg) Thai-boxing gold medal.
1999	Win	(Finland) Sauli Janhunen	IFMA Kings Cup 1999, -75 kg	Bangkok, Thailand	TKO (referee stoppage)	5	0:54
1999-04-23	Win	(Russia) Mikhail Mikhaylov	Casino "Konti": Belarus vs Russia	S-Pb, Russia	TKO (corner stop./towel)	4	3:00
1999-01-28	Win	(Russia)	Boxing Club "Rektor": Belarus vs Russia	Minsk, Belarus	Decision	5	3:00
1998-11-02	Win	(Azerbaijan) Andrei Kurakov	European Open Muaythai Championships	Kyiv, Ukraine	Decision	5	2:00
Wins European Open Muaythai Championships (75 kg) gold medal.
Legend: Win Loss Draw/no contest Notes

== See also ==
- List of K-1 events
- List of K-1 champions
- List of male kickboxers
