= Chakuriki Gym =

Kickboxing gym in Amsterdam, Netherlands

- Est.: 1972 (start); 2012 (defunct)
- Founded by: Thom Harinck
- Primary trainers: Thom Harinck; Chris Dolman
- Training facilities: Amsterdam, Netherlands
- Website: http://pancration.net

Chakuriki Gym was a kickboxing gym and headquartered the International Chakuriki Association located in Amsterdam, the Netherlands. It was also known as Dojo Chakuriki, Pancration Chakuriki, and Chakuriki Amsterdam. Founded in 1972, it was one of the oldest and well-established kickboxing gyms in the Netherlands. It has produced many top-level kickboxers and including K-1 world champions such as Peter Aerts, Branko Cikatić and Badr Hari. It also provided training in wrestling, as well as instruction in knockdown karate, judo, boxing and mixed martial arts.

== History ==
Chakuriki Gym was founded in 1972 by Thom Harinck, who originally began teaching his own style named "Chakuriki". The word Chakuriki is derived from the word "shakuriki” (借力 - "borrowing power"), referring the original style being a mixture of techniques from boxing, Kyokushin karate, judo, jujutsu and wrestling. Chakuriki later became a kickboxing gym as Harinck added Muay Thai and Savate to his repertoire.

Chakuriki found success early on in the "anything goes" full-contact fights organized by Charles Dumerniet. In 1978, fighters from Chakuriki became the first Dutch people to fight at Lumpini Stadium in Bangkok, Thailand. However, the entire Chakuriki team lost all the fights.

During the late 1970s, despite their respective founders being both of the Jon Bluming lineage, Chakuriki became rivals of Mejiro Gym. While the Chakuriki fighters were known for their mental and physical toughness, Mejiro's had a reputation for their technical style. Kickboxing competitions were held regularly in the Jaap Edenhal Arena in Amsterdam and both Mejiro and Chakuriki fighters established themselves as the best in the country. This rivalry helped raise the standard of Dutch kickboxing and spawned some of the best fighters of the era. The 1980s and early 1990s saw a new generation of kickboxers rise from Chakuriki such as Peter Aerts and Branko Cikatić who helped form the history of K-1.

Chakuriki alumni Branko Cikatic founded "Chakuriki Tiger Gym" in his native Croatia, and also established a Japanese branch with Nobu Hayashi as the director.

In 1999, Harinck sold the gym and founded the new Chakuriki/Pancration Gym with Chris Dolman in 2002. Thom Harinck and his son Tommy Harinck were the main coaches, while Wrestling and mixed martial arts were handled by Chris Dolman.

In 2012, Harinck left the gym and Dolman took over completely, rebuilding it as Pancration. Harinck announced his retirement in April 2013 at the age of sixty-nine.

== Notable fighters trained at Chakuriki ==
- (Netherlands) Peter Aerts
- (Switzerland) Xhavit Bajrami
- (Netherlands) Gilbert Ballantine
- (Croatia) Branko Cikatić
- (Netherlands) Lloyd van Dams
- (Netherlands) Hesdy Gerges
- (Morocco) Badr Hari
- (England) Lee Hasdell
- (Japan) Nobu Hayashi
- (Ukraine) Sergei Lascenko
- (France) Jérôme Le Banner
- (Netherlands) Melvin Manhoef
- (Spain) Frank Muñoz
- (Netherlands) Saskia van Rijswijk
- (Brazil) Pedro Rizzo
- (Netherlands) Rene Rooze
- (Brazil) Anderson "Braddock" Silva
- (Netherlands) Perry Ubeda
- (Egypt) Amir Zeyada

== External ==
- Official website
