= Topi Helin =

Finnish Muay Thai kickboxer

- Born: Topi Helin; November 21, 1978 (age 47); Turku, Finland
- Other names: Iron Ball
- Nationality: (Finland) Finnish
- Height: 1.87 m (6 ft 2 in)
- Weight: 88 kg (194 lb; 13.9 st)
- Division: Cruiserweight; Heavyweight
- Style: Muay Thai, Kickboxing
- Team: Turku Thaiboxing

Kickboxing record
- Total: 58
- Wins: 37
- By knockout: 9
- Losses: 14
- Draws: 6
- No contests: 1

Topi "Iron Ball" Helin (born November 21, 1978) is a retired Finnish professional Muay Thai kickboxer, four time Finnish Heavyweight Champion and amateur Muay Thai World Champion. In 2003 he turned pro and had his first tournament in K-1 Scandinavia 2005 in Stockholm, Sweden. He trained out of Turku Thaiboxing Club under his mentor and coach WMC World Champion Riku Immonen.

== Martial arts ==
Helin trained Judo as a child around age of 5 or 6, but switched to Wado-ryu Karate at age of 13 and finally to Muay Thai at 15.

== Titles ==
- 2003 Amateur Muay Thai World Champion in Bangkok (-91 kg)
- 2002 Kings Cup silver medalist
- 2002 European Amateur Muay Thai Championships bronze medalist
- 4 time Finnish Muay Thai Champion

== Kickboxing record ==
37 Wins (9 (T)KO's, 28 decisions), 14 Losses
Date	Result	Opponent	Event	Method	Round	Time
12/15/2007	Win	(Sweden) Jonathan Gromak	Finnfight 9, Turku, Finland	Split Decision	3	3:00
05/20/2006	Loss	(Sweden) Rickard Nordstrand	K-1 Scandinavia Grand Prix 2006, Sweden	Decision (Unanimous)	3	3:00
05/20/2006	Win	(Croatia) Petar Majstorovic	K-1 Scandinavia Grand Prix 2006, Sweden	Ext. R Split Decision	4	3:00
03/21/2006	Win	(Czech Republic) Martin Zawada	Fight Festival 17, Finland	Decision	5	3:00
10/29/2005	Win	(Netherlands) Andre Fyeet	Fight Festival 16, Finland	TKO	3	2:35
05/21/2005	Loss	(England) Gary Turner	K-1 Scandinavia Grand Prix 2005, Sweden	Split Decision	3	3:00
11/13/2004	Loss	(Azerbaijan) Zabit Samedov	Fight Festival 12, Finland	Split Decision	5	3:00
11/13/2004	Win	(Morocco) Mokhtar Bezerroukki	Lumpinee Gaala 2, Finland	KO (Mid Kick)	2	
03/20/2004	Win	(Netherlands) Mohamed Khalifa	Fight Festival 10, Finland	Decision	5	2:00
02/02/2004	Win	(Finland) Timo Savolainen	SM Finnish Muay Thai Championships, Helsinki	TKO (Referee stoppage)	4	3:00
10/20/2003	Win	(Finland) Niklas Winberg	Fight Festival 9, Finland	Decision	5	2:00
09/28/2003	Win	(Sweden) Thomas Rasmussen	Fight Extreme 4, Stockholm	Split Decision	5	2:00
05/19/2003	Win	(France) David Dancrade	Urheilutalo, Helsinki	Decision	5	2:00
03/14/2003	Win	(Belarus) Sergei Gur	Muay Thai World Championships, Bangkok, Thailand	Decision	3	2:00
03/12/2003	Win	(Russia) Magomed Ismailov	Muay Thai World Championships, Bangkok, Thailand	Decision	3	2:00
03/11/2003	Win	(Germany) Asmir Burgic	Muay Thai World Championships, Bangkok, Thailand	Decision	3	2:00
03/08/2003	Win	(Spain) Raul Martin Vegas	Muay Thai World Championships, Bangkok, Thailand	decision	3	2:00
01/26/2003	Win	(Finland) Jussi Savolainen	SM Finnish Muay Thai Championships, Helsinki	Decision	5	3:00
10/31/2002	Win	(Czech Republic) Karl Dubus	European Amateur Muay Thai Championships, France	Decision	4	2:00
10/31/2002	Loss	(Ukraine) Maxim Neledva	European Amateur Muay Thai Championships, France	Decision	4	2:00
07/24/2002	Loss	(Uzbekistan) Yzrinbay Kutibeav	Kings Cup, Thailand	Split Decision	4	2:00
07/22/2002	Win	(Netherlands) Rauel Dennen	Kings Cup, Thailand	KO (High Kick)	3	

== See also ==
- List of male kickboxers
- List of K-1 events
- K-1
