= Zamig Athakishiyev =

Azerbaijani-Turkish kickboxer

- Born: Zamig Athakishiyev; 28 June 1986 (age 40); Azerbaijan SSR, Soviet Union
- Nationality: (Azerbaijan) Azerbaijani (Turkey) Turkish
- Height: 1.82 m (5 ft 11 1/2 in)
- Weight: 91 kg (201 lb; 14.3 st)
- Division: Heavyweight
- Style: Muay Thai, Kickboxing
- Team: Mersin gym

Kickboxing record
- Total: 33
- Wins: 25
- By knockout: 10
- Losses: 8
- By knockout: 0

Zamig Athakishiyev (28 June 1986) is an Azerbaijani-Turkish kickboxer.

== Titles ==
- 2011 WBKF European title (91 kg) champion
- 2010 RMO Istanbul tournament champion
- 2010 Wako European (91 kg k-1) finalist

== Kickboxing record ==
25 Wins (10 (T)KO's, 10 Decisions), 8 Losses
Date	Result	Opponent	Event	Method	Round	Time
2015-05-17	Win	(Turkey) Metin Yaşar	Antalya, Turkey	Decision	3	3:00
2014-12-25	Loss	(France) Patrice Quarteron	One Shot World Series Antalya, Turkey	Decision (Unanimous)	3	3:00
2014-03-30	Loss	(Netherlands) Reamon Welboren	Chok Muay Haarlem, Netherlands	Decision	3	3:00
2013-09-23	Win	(Kazakhstan) Timur Bektrganov	Haydar Aliyev cup Baku, Azerbaijan	Decision	3	3:00
2013-05-10	Loss	(Netherlands) Sam Tevette	SUPERKOMBAT New Heroes 3 Vienna, Austria	Decision (Unanimous)	3	3:00
2011-10-22	Loss	(Belarus) Vitali Akhramenko	Fight Code: Rhinos Series, Quarter Finals Moscow, Russia	Decision (Unanimous)	3	3:00
2011-02-05	Win	(Russia) Shamil Abasov	Fight Code: Rhinos Series, Final 16 (Part 1) Nitra, Slovakia	Decision	3	3:00
2011-09-12	Draw	(Belarus) Alexei Kudin	«Battle Show» 2011 Minsk, Belarus	Decision	4	3:00
2010-12-29	Win	(Latvia) Konstantin Gluhov	RMO Istanbul 2010 Istanbul, Turkey	DQ	4	3:00
Wins RMO Istanbul tournament title.
2010-12-29	Win	(Ukraine) Dmitry Bezus	RMO Istanbul 2010 Istanbul, Turkey	Decision	3	3:00
2010-12-29	Win	(Iran) Cafer Ahmedi	RMO Istanbul 2010 Istanbul, Turkey	Decision	3	3:00
2010-04-24	Loss	(Latvia) Konstantin Gluhov	K-1 World Grand Prix Selection 2010 Istanbul, Turkey	Decision	3	3:00
2010-04-24	Win	(Turkey) Mehmet Ozer	K-1 World Grand Prix Selection 2010 Istanbul, Turkey	Decision	3	3:00
2009-12-26	NC	(Iran) Cafer Ahmedi	Ergen Ring Ateşi 11 Erzurum, Turkey	NC (illegal kick)	1	
Originally, it was announced that Atakisiyev won, though Ahmadi could not continue after a kick below the belt. However, officials overturned the decision to a no contest as the judges scored the bout wrongly..
2009-08-22	Loss	(Turkey) Bahadir Sari	Ergen Ring Ateşi 8, Final Istanbul, Turkey	KO (Low Kick)	2	
For WKN World Grand Prix Turkey Tournament Title.
2009-08-22	Win	(Belarus) Petyr Vylkov	Ergen Ring Ateşi 8, Semi Finals Istanbul, Turkey			
2009-08-01	Loss	(Turkey) Bahadir Sari	Ergen Ring Ateşi 7 Ankara, Turkey			
2009-07-??	Win	(Turkey) Gurhan Degirmenci	WDC World Championship, Fight Time Turkey	TKO (Doctor Stoppage)	3	0:00
2009-07-03	Win	(Turkey) Coşkun Şakar	Ergen Ring Ateşi 6 İzmir, Turkey			
2009-02-27	Win	(Turkey) Hamza Kendircioğlu	Ergen Ring Ateşi 4 Turkey			
2008-03-30	Loss	(Azerbaijan) Rail Recebov	Azerbaijan Professional Kickboxing champion Baku, Azerbaijan	Decision	3	3:00
2008-03-30	Win	(Azerbaijan) Vuqar Kazimov	Azerbaijan Professional Kickboxing champion Baku, Azerbaijan	Decision	3	3:00

== See also ==
- List of heavyweight boxing champions
- List of male kickboxers
