= Ronnie Green (kickboxer) =

British professional kickboxer (b.1957)

- Born: April 1, 1959 (age 67); Manchester, England, United Kingdom
- Nationality: British
- Height: 1.70 m (5 ft 7 in)
- Weight: 61 kg (134 lb; 9.6 st)
- Style: Muay Thai
- Trainer: Master Toddy
- Years active: 1979-2002

Ronnie "Machine Gun" Green (born April 1, 1959) is a retired British professional kickboxer who is a former six-time world champion.

== Biography ==
Green became a world champion in kickboxing and was the first British person to do so. Green also won titles in four different weight divisions. Green was raised in Manchester and first began training in martial arts in 1974, taking up judo and karate. Green began his training with Thohsaphon "Master Toddy" Sitiwatjana at his Deansgate gym in Manchester, England, in 1977. After wins in the Netherlands and France, Green became the first Brit to win a kickboxing match in Thailand by defeating Lamnak Pitiporn at Rajadamnern Stadium in March 1983. Green won the European Muay Thai title in by defeating Yasunori Suda in July 1983 and the World WKA Super Featherweight title in 1984 by defeating Joao Vieira in Amsterdam. Green fought Sombat Sor Thanikul to a draw in 1990 in London, an event that was one of the first kickboxing championships broadcast from the UK to Thailand. In a rematch ten months later, he defeated Thanikul, won the IMF World Title. in 1992 he fought Samaisuk Chuwattana twice for the Muay Thai World Title winning the first fight by decision and lost the rematch by knockout. He formally retired from fighting in 2002. He accomplished the World Kickboxing Association (WKA) light middleweight and super welterweight full contact titles, IMF title, European Muay Thai title, and the Muay Thai world title.

== Fight record (incomplete) ==
Professional Kickboxing record
90 Wins, 8 Losses, 2 Draws
Date	Result	Opponent	Event	Location	Method	Round	Time
1995-	Win	(United Kingdom) Lance Lewis	Clash for Cash	Manchester, England	Decision		
1993-12-04	Loss	(Canada) Pete Cunningham	W.K.A. Event at Mirage Hotel	Las Vegas, Nevada, USA	Decision (unanimous)	12	2:00
WKA Kickboxing World Super Lightweight title.
?	Win	(United Kingdom) Paul Lenihan	WKA Thai Boxing	United Kingdom	Decision	5	3:00
?	Win	(United States) Darrell Eckles	Thai Boxing Superfights	Oldham, England			
1992-	Loss	(Thailand) Samaisuk Chuwattana		London, England	KO	1	
Loses Muay Thai World title.
1992-04-	Win	(Thailand) Samaisuk Chuwattana		London, England	Decision (Majority)	5	3:00
Wins Muay Thai World title.
1990-11-18	Win	(Thailand) Sombat Sor.Thanikul		London, England	Decision	5	3:00
Wins IMF Lightweight title.
1990-01-28	Draw	(Thailand) Sombat Sor.Thanikul	IMF at Pickett's Lock	London, England	Decision	5	3:00
1989-11-19	Win	(Netherlands) Joao Vieira		Amsterdam, Netherlands	Decision	12	2:00
Wins WKA Kickboxing World Super Featherweight title.
1989-03-18	Loss	(Thailand) Sagat Petchyindee	AJKF	Tokyo, Japan	Decision (Unanimous)	5	3:00
1988-	Win	(Japan) Li		Hong Kong			
1988-03-12	Win	(Japan) Kyoji Saito	A.J.K.F "Kakutougi Daisensou"	Tokyo, Japan	KO (Punches)	11	1:46
Wins WKA Kickboxing World Lightweight title.
1987-11-15	Win	(Japan) Kyoji Saito	A.J.K.F "Super Fight 3"	Tokyo, Japan	Decision	5	3:00
1987-09-	Win	(Republic of Ireland) Brian Cullen		Manchester, England	Decision	12	2:00
WKA Kickboxing World title.
1987-07-15	Win	(Japan) Eiji Kai	A.J.K.F	Tokyo, Japan	KO (High kick + punches)	1	2:53
1986-	Loss	(United States) Pat Romero	Master Toddy Promotion	Manchester, England	Decision	12	2:00
Loses WKA Kickboxing World Super Featherweight title.
?	Win	(France) Mohamed Jami		Manchester, England	Decision	5	3:00
1985-05-12	Win	(Thailand) Pud Pad Nee	Kickfighters IV	Amsterdam, Netherlands	KO (Left hook)	1	
1984-10-26	Win	(France) Jo Prestia		Manchester, England	Decision	5	3:00
1984-09-	Win	(Republic of Ireland) Gallen		Dublin, Ireland			
1984-04-21	Win	(Netherlands) Joao Vieira	Night of the Stars	Amsterdam, Netherlands	KO	2	
Wins WKA Kickboxing World Super Featherweight title.
1984-01-12	Draw	(Netherlands) Joao Vieira		Amsterdam, Netherlands	Decision	5	3:00
1983-09-23	Draw	(France) Philippe Cantamessi		Amsterdam, Netherlands	Decision	5	3:00
For the European Muay Thai 130 lbs title.
1983-07-15	Win	(Japan) Yasunori Suda		Hong Kong	TKO (Elbow)	3	
1983-06-18	Win	(South Korea) Jin		Hong Kong	KO	1	
1983-04-08	Win	(Thailand) La		Hong Kong	Decision	5	3:00
1983-03-31	Win	(Thailand) Lamnak Pitiporn	Rajadamnern Stadium	Bangkok, Thailand	KO	2	
1982-06-11	Win	(Thailand) Wattana Soudareth		France	KO (Left hook)	5	
1982-04-04	Win	(Netherlands) Gilbert Ballantine		Amsterdam, Netherlands	Decision	5	3:00
?	Loss	(Suriname) Lucien Carbin			KO	2	
?	Loss	(France) René Desjardins		France	KO	4	
1979-	Win	(Thailand) Lonkeada Muangsurin		Amsterdam, Netherlands	KO	5	
Legend: Win Loss Draw/No contest Notes
