= Sergei Gur =

Belarusian kickboxer (born 1978)

- Born: Siarhiej Hur; June 6, 1978 (age 48); Minsk, Byelorussian SSR, Soviet Union
- Native name: Сергей Гур
- Nationality: Belarusian
- Height: 1.82 m (6 ft 0 in)
- Weight: 100 kg (220 lb; 15 st 10 lb)
- Division: Heavyweight
- Style: Kickboxing, Muay Thai
- Team: Chinuk Gym
- Trainer: Andrei Gridin
- Years active: 1998–2008

Kickboxing record
- Total: 82
- Wins: 59
- By knockout: 36
- Losses: 21
- By knockout: 5
- Draws: 2

Mixed martial arts record
- Total: 2
- Wins: 0
- Losses: 1
- By submission: 1
- Draws: 1

Other information
- Mixed martial arts record from Sherdog

Sergei Gur (Russian: Сергей Гур Belarusian: Сяргей Гур, romanized: Siarhiej Hur; born June 6, 1978) is a Belarusian former kickboxer from Minsk. He is a former 2004 WMF World Heavyweight Muay Thai champion and two time K-1 Italy tournament champion.

== Biography ==
Sergei Gur entered K-1 in 2001, following the footsteps of his training partner Alexey Ignashov. He won his first tournament on April 21 in Milan, Italy, by three consecutive TKO's over Danilo Capuzi, Franz Haller and Rani Berbachi. On his next fight he was matched up against three time K-1 World champion Ernesto Hoost in K-1 Oceanian preliminarily held in Melbourne, Australia. Hoost won the fight in the first round by three knockdowns.

Gur's next tournament win in K-1 came in K-1 France GP 2004 held in Marseille. The win qualified him for K-1 World GP The Battle of Bellagio III, held in Las Vegas, Nevada. Gur lost a hard-fought battle in quarter finals against Mighty Mo by unanimous decision.

== Titles ==
Professional

- 2007 K-1 Fighting Network Latvia tournament champion
- 2007 K-1 Italy tournament runner up
- 2006 W.B.K.F. Muaythai Eurasian champion -93 kg (0 title defences)
- 2006 K-1 Italy tournament champion
- 2005 W.B.K.F. Muaythai Eurasian champion -93 kg (0 title defences)
- 2004 K-1 Marseille tournament champion
- 2003 World Kickboxing Network (W.K.N.) European champion -96 kg
- 2003 Cup of Arbat tournament runner up -93 kg

Amateur

- 2005 W.A.K.O. World Championships in Agadir, Morocco (silver) +91 kg (Thai-Boxing)
- 2004 W.M.F. Muaythai World Championships in Bangkok, Thailand (gold) +91 kg
- 2000 I.M.T.F. European champion

== Kickboxing record ==
Muay Thai record
59 wins (36 (T)KOs, 23 decisions), 21 losses, 2 draws
Date	Result	Opponent	Event	Location	Method	Round	Time
08/23/2016	Loss	(Russia) Turpal Tokaev	Akhmat Fight Show		KO	2	3:00
02/09/2008	Loss	(Romania) Cătălin Moroşanu	Local Kombat 27 "Porţile de fier"	Severin, Romania	Decision	3	3:00
10/13/2007	Loss	(France) Freddy Kemayo	K-1 World GP 2008	Budapest, Hungary	TKO (low kicks)	2	2:53
11/30/2007	Win	(Bosnia and Herzegovina) Dzevad Poturak	Night of Fighters 4	Bratislava, Slovakia	Decision	3	3:00
06/09/2007	Loss	(Czech Republic) Tomáš Hron	K-1 Italy Oktagon 2007	Milan, Italy	Decision	3	3:00
04/14/2007	Loss	(France) Patrice Quarteron	K-1 Rules Kick Tournament 2007 in Marseille	Marseille, France	TKO	3	
12/06/2006	Loss	(Belarus) Alexei Kudin	WBKF Eurasian Muay Thai title (+93 kg)	Moscow, Russia	Decision (split)	5	3:00
06/02/2006	Loss	(Romania) Ionuţ Iftimoaie	Local Kombat 21, Romania	Decision	3	3:00	
04/08/2006	Win	(Bosnia and Herzegovina) Dzevad Poturak	K-1 Italy Oktagon 2006	Milan	Decision	3	3:00
02/17/2006	Win	(France) Freddy Kemayo	K-1 European League 2006 in Bratislava	Slovakia	KO (flying knee strike)	1	2:15
01/20/2006	Loss	(France) Rani Berbachi	K-1 Fighting Network 2006 in Marseilles, France	Disqualification			
12/18/2005	Loss	(Czech Republic) Ladislav Zak	Heaven or Hell 5	Prague, Czech Republic	Decision	3	3:00
10/12/2005	Loss	(France) Gregory Tony	K-1 Italy 2005 Oktagon	Milan	Decision	3	3:00
02/19/2005	Loss	(Sweden) Jorgen Kruth	WMC World Title	Stockholm, Sweden	Decision	5	3:00
01/29/2005	Win	(Croatia) Petar Majstorovic	K-1 MAX Spain 2004	Guadalajara, Spain	Decision draw	3	3:00
10/30/2004	Win	(Slovakia) Roman Kupčák	Noc Bojovnikov, Bratislava, Sloviakia	Decision	3	3:00	
08/07/2004	Loss	(American Samoa) Mighty Mo	K-1 World Grand Prix 2004 in Las Vegas II	USA	Decision	5	3:00
04/24/2004	Draw	(Croatia) Petar Majstorovic	K-1 Italy 2004	Milan, Italy	Decision	3	3:00
03/27/2004	Win	(Suriname) Jerrel Venetiaan	K-1 World Grand Prix 2004 in Saitama	Saitama, Japan	Decision (majority)	3	3:00
01/24/2004	Win	(Portugal) Humberto Evora	K-1 Marseille 2004 World Qualification	France	KO	2	1:35
01/24/2004	Win	(France) Christophe Carron	K-1 Marseille 2004 World Qualification	France	TKO	2	1:55
01/24/2004	Win	(France) Matthias Riccio	K-1 Marseille 2004 World Qualification	France	TKO (referee stoppage)	2	1:02
12/24/2003	Win	(Georgia (country)) Zurab Besiashvili	WKN European Muay Thai title (96 kg)	Moscow, Russia	Decision	5	3:00
10/31/2003	Loss	(South Africa) Mike Bernardo	K-1 Final Fight Stars War in Zagreb	Croatia	TKO (referee stoppage)	2	
05/31/2003	Win	(Japan) Noboru Uchida	Tokyo, Japan	Decision	3	3:00	
04/16/2003	Loss	(Belarus) Vitali Akhramenko	Cup of Arbat Tournament Final (-93 kg)	Moscow, Russia	Decision (unanimous)	5	3:00
04/16/2003	Win	(Russia) Sergei Shemetov	Cup of Arbat Tournament 1/2 finals (-93 kg)	Moscow, Russia	TKO (referee stop./leg injury)	1	
04/16/2003	Win	(Kazakhstan) Timur Porsukov	Cup of Arbat Tournament 1/4 finals (-93 kg)	Moscow, Russia	Decision (unanimous)	4	3:00
02/06/2002	Win	(Denmark) Nicholas Pettas	K-1 Survival 2002	Japan	TKO (doctor stoppage)	2	1:00
06/16/2001	Loss	(Netherlands) Ernesto Hoost	K-1 World Grand Prix 2001 in Melbourne	Australia	TKO	1	2:03
04/21/2001	Win	(France) Rani Berbachi	K-1 Italy Grand Prix 2001 Preliminary	Italy	TKO (rib injury)	3	
04/21/2001	Win	(Italy) Franz Haller	K-1 Italy Grand Prix 2001 Preliminary	Italy	KO	1	
04/21/2001	Win	(Italy) Danilo Capuzi	K-1 Italy Grand Prix 2001 Preliminary	Italy	KO	2	
03/14/2001	Win	(Finland) Topi Helin	Muay Thai World Championships	Bangkok, Thailand	Decision	5	3:00
06/24/2000	Win	(Russia) Wahid Vueneki	K-1 Belarus Grand Prix 2000, IMTF European Title	Minsk, Belarus	TKO	2	
Legend: Win Loss Draw/no contest Notes

== Mixed martial arts record ==
Professional record breakdown
2 matches	0 wins	1 loss
By submission	0	1
Draws	1	

Res.	Record	Opponent	Method	Event	Date	Round	Time	Location	Notes
Draw	0-1 (1)	Vygandas Grazhys	Draw	RF 2000 - Lithuania vs Belarus, Lithuania	March 12, 2000	1	20:00		
Loss	0–1	Andrei Semenov	Submission (armbar)	M-1 MFC - Russia Open Tournament	December 5, 1999	1	1:17		

== See also ==
- List of male kickboxers
- List of K-1 events
