= Gilbert Ballantine =

Dutch kickboxer

- Born: March 14, 1961 (age 65); Paramaribo, Suriname
- Other names: The Bull Terrier
- Nationality: Dutch
- Height: 1.65 m (5 ft 5 in)
- Weight: 69 kg (152 lb; 10.9 st)
- Division: Featherweight; Lightweight; Welterweight; Super Welterweight
- Style: Wado Ryu; Pencak Silat; Savate; Judo
- Fighting out of: Amsterdam, Netherlands
- Team: Chakuriki Gym; Dolman Gym
- Trainer: Thom Harinck; Chris Dolman
- Years active: 1981–2003

Kickboxing record
- Total: 70
- Wins: 52
- By knockout: 17
- Losses: 17
- By knockout: 2
- Draws: 1

Mixed martial arts record
- Total: 6
- Wins: 3
- By knockout: 2
- By submission: 1
- Losses: 1
- By knockout: 1
- Draws: 2

Other information
- Website: www.gilbertballantine.nl
- Mixed martial arts record from Sherdog
- Last updated on: December 8, 2012

Gilbert Ballantine (born 14 March 1961) is a Surinamese-Dutch retired professional kickboxer and a nine-time kickboxing and Muay Thai world champion. He also took part in mixed martial arts competition, winning three Rings Dutch championships.

== Biography ==
Ballantine started training in judo at a young age, in which he received a blue belt. Then he began practicing karate. He became a Dutch and European full contact karate champion. He also practised pencak silat. He then looked for bigger challenges, eventually discovering kickboxing and Muay Thai. Ballantine became a student of Thom Harinck, a pioneer of kickboxing in the west, and was one of the first top fighters who fought out of Chakuriki Gym.

Ballantine became a three-time European and a nine-time World kickboxing and Muay Thai champion. During his career he has faced many highly ranked Asian and European opponents. He holds notable victories over fighters such as Ramon Dekkers (twice), Sangtiennoi Sor.Rungroj and Michael Kuhr. He also faced Muay Thai legend Samart Payakaroon in Bangkok, Thailand.

After his kickboxing career, Ballantine also competed in mixed martial arts competition and won three Rings Dutch championships.

Ballantine retired from fighting in 2003. After his career, he taught Kickboxing and Muay Thai at Mandingo Gym, Purmerend.

== Titles ==
- 2002 Rings Dutch -80 kg Champion
- 2001 Rings Dutch -70 kg Champion (1 title defense)
- 1994 IPTA Muaythai World Super Lightweight Champion
- 1992 IMTA Muaythai World Champion (1 title defense)
- 1991 IKBF Kickboxing World Lightweight Champion
- 1991 IKBF Full Contact World Lightweight Champion
- 1990 WMTA Muaythai World Champion (2 title defenses)
- 1989 FFKA Kickboxing World Champion
- 1988 WMTA Muaythai World Champion
- 1987 EMTA Muaythai European Champion
- 1987 KICK Kickboxing World Champion
- 1986 WKA Full Contact European Champion
- 1986 MTBN Muaythai Dutch Champion
- 1985 NBFBS Savate Dutch Champion
- 1984 MTBN Muaythai Dutch Champion
- 1982 Kyokushin Dutch Open Lightweight runner-up (lost to Lucien Carbin)

== Kickboxing record ==
Kickboxing record
52 wins, 17 losses, 1 draw
| Date | Result | Opponent | Event | Location | Method | Round | Time | Record |
| 2001-03-18 | Win | (Morocco) Ridouan El Assrouti | | Rotterdam, Netherlands | KO | | | 52-17-1 |
| 1999-10-30 | Loss | (Turkey) Coscun Dag | | Rotterdam, Netherlands | Decision | 5 | 3:00 | 51-17-1 |
| 1998-11-14 | Win | (Morocco) Farid Elmoussaui | | Amsterdam, Netherlands | Decision | 5 | 3:00 | 51-16-1 |
| 1998-04-26 | Loss | (Japan) Kenichi Ogata | WSBA "RKS Presents Shoot the Shooto XX" | Yokohama, Japan | Decision | 5 | 3:00 | 50-16-1 |
| 1997-11-29 | Loss | (Japan) Takehiro Murahama | Shootboxing | Tokyo, Japan | Decision | 5 | 3:00 | 50-15-1 |
| 1997-06-01 | Win | (Morocco) Achmed Gounane | | Amsterdam, Netherlands | Decision | 5 | 3:00 | 50-14-1 |
| 1997 | Loss | (Morocco) Fikri Tijarti | | Amsterdam, Netherlands | Decision | 5 | 3:00 | 49-14-1 |
| 1996-10-19 | Win | (Japan) Sato | | Tokyo, Japan | Decision | 5 | 3:00 | 49-13-1 |
| 1996-09-21 | Loss | (United States) Hector Pena | | United States | TKO | | | 48-13-1 |
| 1995-12-09 | Win | (Japan) Asuka Nobuya | | Tokyo, Japan | KO | | | 48-12-1 |
| 1995-11-25 | Win | (Netherlands) Bruno Fuzo | | Wiesbaden, Germany | Decision | 5 | 3:00 | 47-12-1 |
| 1995-11-17 | Loss | (Thailand) Raweenoi Petchudon | Lumpinee Stadium | Bangkok, Thailand | Decision | 5 | 3:00 | 46-12-1 |
Fight was for WMTC (currently WMC) World Junior Welterweight championship.
| 1995-10-28 | Win | (Netherlands) Bruno Fuzo | Shock Of Europe | Amsterdam, Netherlands | Decision | 5 | 3:00 | 46-11-1 |
| 1995-06-10 | Win | (Belgium) Osman Yigin | | Zurich, Switzerland | KO | 4 | 2:24 | 45-11-1 |
| 1995-03-25 | Win | (Japan) Satoshi Niizuma | | Tokyo, Japan | Decision | 5 | 3:00 | 44-11-1 |
| 1994-11-12 | Win | (Belgium) Noel van de Heuvel | | Amsterdam, Netherlands | TKO | 2 | | 43-11-1 |
| 1994-10-02 | Win | (Thailand) Chanoy Pon Tawee | | Hamburg, Germany | Decision | 5 | 3:00 | 42-11-1 |
Wins IPTA World Super Lightweight championship.
| 1994-09-12 | Win | (Morocco) Abdullah Quay | | Rotterdam, Netherlands | Decision | 5 | 3:00 | 41-11-1 |
| 1994-02-20 | Loss | (Netherlands) Ramon Dekkers | The Night of the Thriller | Amsterdam, Netherlands | Decision | 5 | 3:00 | 40-11-1 |
| 1993-12-05 | Loss | (Thailand) Samart Payakaroon | King's Birthday | Bangkok, Thailand | Decision | 5 | 3:00 | 40-10-1 |
| 1993-09-19 | Win | (Thailand) Lom-Isan Sor.Thanikul | | Amsterdam, Netherlands | Decision | 5 | 3:00 | 40-9-1 |
Retains IMTA World championship.
| 1993-08-08 | Loss | (Thailand) Robert Kaennorasing | | Shang Zen, China | Decision | 5 | 3:00 | 39-9-1 |
| 1993-03-07 | Win | (Netherlands) Iwan Meenis | | Amsterdam, Netherlands | Decision | 5 | 3:00 | 39-8-1 |
| 1993-01-23 | Win | (Thailand) Sajchit | | Berlin, Germany | Decision | 5 | 3:00 | 38-8-1 |
| 1992-09-20 | Win | (Netherlands) Ramon Dekkers | The Night of Truth | Amsterdam, Netherlands | Decision | 5 | 3:00 | 37-8-1 |
| 1992-06-27 | Win | (Thailand) Wittaya Soudareth | | Oranjestad, Aruba | KO | 4 | | 36-8-2 |
Retains WMTA World championship.
| 1992-03-22 | Win | (Thailand) Chanoy Pon Tawee | | Amsterdam, Netherlands | Decision | 5 | 3:00 | 35-8-1 |
Wins IMTA World championship.
| 1991-10-19 | Win | (Germany) Michael Kuhr | | Berlin, Germany | Decision | 11 | 2:00 | 34-8-1 |
Wins IKBF Fullcontact World Lightweight championship.
| 1991-02-02 | Win | (Germany) Murat Comert | | Karlsruhe, Germany | KO | 6 | | 33-8-1 |
Wins IKBF Kickboxing World Lightweight championship.
| 1990-10-14 | Win | (Thailand) Sangtiennoi Sor.Rungroj | | Amsterdam, Netherlands | Decision | 5 | 3:00 | 32-8-2 |
Retains WMTA World championship.
| 1990-05-27 | Loss | (Thailand) Kongtoranee Payakaroon | | Paris, France | Decision | 5 | 3:00 | 31-8-1 |
| 1990-04-24 | Win | (Germany) Thomas Seiler | | Düsseldorf, Germany | TKO | 6 | | 31-7-1 |
| 1990-03-31 | Win | (Thailand) Sangyout Narasvath | | Brest, France | Decision | 5 | 3:00 | 30-7-1 |
| 1990-01-28 | Win | (Thailand) Fannoy Wittay Kunsong | | Amsterdam, Netherlands | Decision | 5 | 3:00 | 29-7-1 |
Wins WMTA World championship.
| 1989-11-26 | Win | (Mexico) Jorge Angat | | Groningen, Netherlands | Decision | 12 | 2:00 | 28-7-1 |
Wins FFKA World championship.
| 1989-10-08 | Win | (Netherlands) Ramon Dekkers | | Amsterdam, Netherlands | Decision | 5 | 3:00 | 27-7-1 |
| 1989-04-29 | Loss | (Thailand) Chanchai Sor Tamarangsri | Championnat du Monde Boxe Thai | France | Decision | 5 | 3:00 | 26-7-1 |
| 1989-04-21 | Loss | (United States) Steve Demencuk | | Portland, United States | Decision | 10 | 2:00 | 26-6-1 |
| 1989-02-19 | Win | (Thailand) Deme Pomphet | | Amsterdam, Netherlands | TKO | 4 | | 26-5-1 |
| 1988-11-13 | Win | (Netherlands) Gerold Mamadeus | | Enschede, Netherlands | Decision | 7 | 2:00 | 25-5-1 |
Wins PKA Dutch championship.
| 1988-06-19 | Win | (Thailand) Anakhoun | | Amsterdam, Netherlands | KO | 4 | | 24-5-1 |
| 1988-02-27 | Win | (Morocco) Milo El Geubli | | Amsterdam, Netherlands | KO | 3 | | 23-5-1 |
Wins WMTA World championship.
| 1987-11-22 | Win | (Netherlands) Iwan Meenis | | Rotterdam, Netherlands | Decision | 5 | 3:00 | 22-5-1 |
| 1987-11-08 | Win | (United States) Norris Williams | | Amsterdam, Netherlands | KO | 3 | | 21-5-1 |
Wins KICK World championship.
| 1987-09-27 | Win | (Cape Verde) Joao Vieira | | Amsterdam, Netherlands | Decision | 5 | 3:00 | 20-5-1 |
| 1987-04-26 | Win | (England) Jun Samon | | Amsterdam, Netherlands | KO | 3 | | 19-5-1 |
Wins EMTA European championship.
| 1986-11-03 | Win | (Netherlands) Romeo Charry | | Amsterdam, Netherlands | Decision | 5 | 3:00 | 18-5-1 |
Wins MTBN Dutch championship.
| 1986-05-03 | Win | (Germany) Theo Hauser | | Hanau, Germany | KO | 7 | | 17-5-1 |
Wins WKA Full Contact European championship.
| 1986-03-09 | Loss | (France) Espano | | Rotterdam, Netherlands | Decision | | | 16-5-1 |
| 1985-12-07 | Win | (France) Richard Nam | | Basse-Terre, Guadeloupe | Decision | 5 | 3:00 | 16-4-1 |
| 1985-11-30 | Win | (France) Rene Desjardins | | Fort-de-France, Martinique | KO | 1 | | 15-4-1 |
| 1985-09-08 | Win | (Netherlands) Lempoer | | Amsterdam, Netherlands | Decision | | | 14-4-1 |
Wins NBFBS Savate Dutch championship.
| 1985-04-13 | Win | (Thailand) Lav | | Stockholm, Sweden | Decision | 5 | 3:00 | 13-4-1 |
| 1985-01-27 | Loss | (Morocco) Mousid Akhamrane | | Amsterdam, Netherlands | Decision | | | 12-4-1 |
| 1984-08-16 | Win | (Cape Verde) Joao Vieira | | Amsterdam, Netherlands | Decision | 5 | 3:00 | 12-3-1 |
Wins MTBN Dutch championship.
| 1984-02-17 | Loss | (Switzerland) Jerome Canabate | | Geneve, Switzerland | Decision | | | 11-3-1 |
| 1984-04-01 | Win | (Germany) Ratske | | Germany | KO | 2 | | 11-2-1 |
| 1984-02-17 | Loss | (Thailand) Sodaret Ratchy | | Paris, France | KO | 3 | | 10-2-1 |
| 1983-12-19 | Win | (France) Philippe Cantamesi | | Paris, France | Decision | 5 | 3:00 | 10-1-1 |
| 1983-11-27 | Win | (Netherlands) Jacky Vonk | | Amsterdam, Netherlands | KO | 1 | | 9-1-1 |
| 1983-06-08 | Win | (Cape Verde) Joao Vieira | | Amsterdam, Netherlands | Decision | | | 8-1-1 |
| 1983-05-23 | Win | (Netherlands) Romeo Charry | | Amsterdam, Netherlands | Decision | | | 7-1-1 |
| 1982-04-04 | Loss | (England) Ronnie Green | | Amsterdam, Netherlands | Decision | 5 | 3:00 | 6-1-1 |
| 1982-01-17 | Draw | (Netherlands) Ivan Sprang | | Amsterdam, Netherlands | Decision draw | 5 | 3:00 | 6-0-1 |
| 1981-11-23 | Win | (Netherlands) Kok | | Amsterdam, Netherlands | Decision | | | 6-0 |
| 1981-10-03 | Win | (Netherlands) Fortes | | Rotterdam, Netherlands | Decision | | | 5-0 |
| 1981-09-20 | Win | (Netherlands) John Hardenbol | | Amsterdam, Netherlands | KO | 1 | | 4-0 |
| 1981-06-01 | Win | (Netherlands) Grandjean | | Amsterdam, Netherlands | Decision | | | 3-0 |
| 1981-05-17 | Win | (Netherlands) Meis | | Rotterdam, Netherlands | Decision | | | 2-0 |
| 1981-03-09 | Win | (Netherlands) Blom | | Amsterdam, Netherlands | Decision | | | 1-0 |
Legend: Win Loss Draw/no contest Notes

== Mixed martial arts record ==
Professional record breakdown
| 6 matches | 3 wins | 1 loss |
| By knockout | 2 | 1 |
| By submission | 1 | 0 |
| By decision | 0 | 0 |
| Draws | 2 | |

| Res. | Record | Opponent | Method | Event | Date | Round | Time | Location | Notes |
|---|---|---|---|---|---|---|---|---|---|
| Draw | 3-1–2 | (Netherlands) Robbie Nelson | Draw | It's Showtime - Amsterdam Arena | June 8, 2003 | 2 | 5:00 | Haarlem, Netherlands | |
| Loss | 3-1-1 | (Turkey) Sahin Yakut | TKO (doctor stoppage) | Rings Holland - One Moment In Time | December 1, 2002 | 1 | 0:51 | Utrecht, Netherlands | |
| Draw | 3-0–1 | (Netherlands) Robbie Nelson | Draw | It's Showtime - As Usual | September 29, 2002 | 2 | 5:00 | Haarlem, Netherlands | |
| Win | 3-0 | (Netherlands) Ronny Rivano | KO (punch) | Rings Holland - Saved by the Bell | June 2, 2002 | 3 | 1:20 | Amsterdam, Netherlands | Wins Rings Dutch -80 kg title. |
| Win | 2-0 | (Netherlands) Daan Kooiman | Submission (guillotine choke) | Rings Holland - Some Like It Hard | December 2, 2001 | 1 | 2:30 | Utrecht, Netherlands | Defends Rings Dutch -70 kg title. |
| Win | 1-0 | (Netherlands) Brian Lo-A-Njoe | TKO (punches and knee) | Rings Holland - Heroes Live Forever | January 28, 2001 | 2 | 2:09 | Utrecht, Netherlands | Wins Rings Dutch -70 kg title. |

== See also ==
- List of K-1 events
- List of male kickboxers
