= Thohsaphol Sitiwatjana =

Thai martial artist and trainer

Master Toddy
- ทศพร สิทธิวัจน์
- Born: 4 May 1953 (age 73); Samut Prakarn, Thailand
- Other name: Master Toddy
- Occupation: Muay Thai instructor
- Organization: MTIA
- Website: Official website

Thohsaphon Sitiwatjana (Thai: ทศพร สิทธิวัจน์; born May 4, 1953) is a Thai martial artist and Muay Thai instructor. He is known as Master Toddy because, when he moved to the UK, many people were unable to pronounce his name correctly. Thohsaphon has been a Muay Thai instructor since the age of 16 and has trained over 40 world champions over 5 decades. He has also featured in several movies and produced his own television shows.

== Biography and career ==
Thohsaphon Sitiwatjana was born the son of Sophorn Sitiwatjana a police chief, and Sudsac Sitiwatjana. From the age of 5 years old, Thohsaphon had been fascinated by martial arts including Taekwondo and Muay Thai. By the age of 13 he had acquired a black belt in taekwondo. Thohsaphon trained in Muay Thai under Seri Ramaruud, Sanong Rakwanid and Pansak Ratanaprasit. At 16 years of age, he was given his first chance to teach Muay Thai after his teacher fell ill and, within just a few years, he became head coach at his school. Thohsaphon started to adapt his training style including various capabilities of strength and style. He would train his own agility, skill and strength by wrestling crocodiles at the Samut Prakarn crocodile farm which was previously owned by his parents.

Muay Thai is seen by many in Thailand as being a poor man's sport and Thohsaphon's parents were therefore opposed to him taking part in fights. Thohsaphon would often sneak out and take part in bareknuckle fights on the streets of Bangkok as well as temple fights when they were offered to him.

After graduating from college, Thohsaphon decided to audition for a role in the James Bond film The Man with the Golden Gun. In order to get the part, he fought four of six students from Bruce Lee's school of Jeet Kune Do. After he beat four of the students, the remaining two withdrew and thus Thohsaphon had gotten the part. He also gave special training to Roger Moore for his part in the film.

After filming "The Man with the Golden Gun", Thohsaphon made his way to England in 1975. He is widely known there as the "Father of English Muay Thai" for introducing Muay Thai to England. Thohsaphon moved to Manchester where he opened a Muay Thai Gym. There he trained many fighters such as Kash Gill and Lisa Howarth but arguably his most successful fighter was Ronnie Green who became 5-time world Muay Thai Champion under Thohsaphon. His gym in Manchester, England is still running today and is now owned by his younger brother Master A. (himself a highly successful Muay Thai instructor).

In 1993, Thohsaphon left England and moved to Las Vegas, United States. After several failed ventures trying to introduce the art of Muay Thai to the United States of America Thohsaphon finally found success opening "Master Toddy's U.S. Muay Thai Center". He believes that opening a gym in America has made him "a black belt in business". At one point "Master Toddy's U.S. Muay Thai Center" had up to 480 active students enrolled, bringing in up to $50,000 each month. During his time in The States Thohsaphon trained many fighters including Gina Carano, Randy Couture and Tito Ortiz.

After spending 16 years in the U.S.A. Thohsaphon decided it was time to move home back to Thailand. In 2009, he did just that after purchasing land in the Samut Prakan district just south of Bangkok. The gym, named "Master Toddy's Muay Thai Academy", not only trains students who want to learn the art of Muay Thai but also those wanting to become a "Kru" or teacher of Muay Thai. Both Thohsaphon himself and the gym he owns has been accredited by the Thai government on several occasions.

== Notable fighters trained ==
- Gina Carano
- Randy Couture
- Lisa Howarth
- Tito Ortiz
- Bob Sapp
- Maurice Smith
- Dale Cook
- Melchor Menor
- Ronnie Green

== Screen appearances ==
- 2014: My Morphin' Life – Jason David Frank
- 2007: Warrior Nation on MSNBC
- 2006: Fight Girls
- 2005: Ring Girls
- 2005: Criss Angel Mindfreak
- 1996: Sword Of Honour
- 1974: The Man With the Golden Gun
