= Thom Harinck =

Dutch martial artist

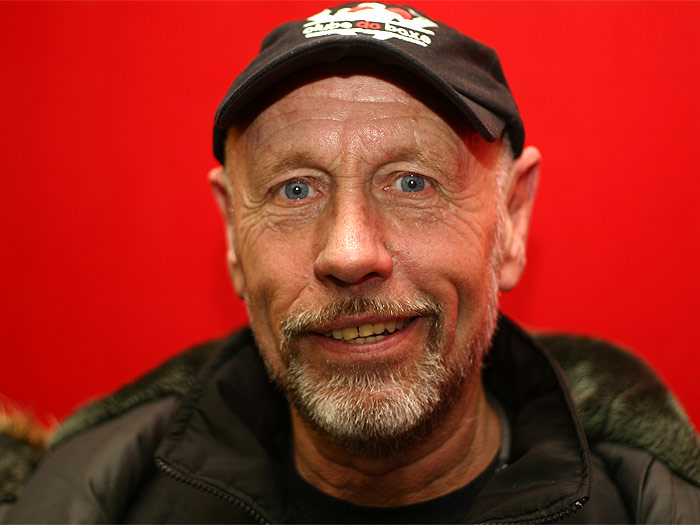
- Born: 22 December 1943 (age 82); The Hague, Netherlands
- Style: Judo, Kickboxing, Muay Thai, Kyokushin Karate, Savate, Kempo, Wrestling, Boxing, Dutch kickboxing,
- Team: Chakuriki Gym
- Rank: black belt in Judo black belt in Jujutsu; 6th degree black belt in Kyokushin; 7th degree black belt in kenpo

Other information
- Occupation: Kickboxing Trainer, kickboxer
- Notable students: Peter Aerts, Gilbert Ballantine, Branko Cikatić, Lloyd van Dams, Hesdy Gerges, Badr Hari, Jérôme Le Banner, Melvin Manhoef, Anderson Silva, Perry Ubeda

Thom Harinck (born 22 December 1943) is a Dutch kickboxer and kickboxing trainer and founder of the Chakuriki Gym in Amsterdam. He is married to Marjan Olfers, former member of the board of Ajax and since May 2012 professor in sports law at Vrije Universiteit Amsterdam.

== Biography ==
Harinck started training in judo and wrestling at 8 years of age. He ended up giving up on judo, after he wasn't allowed to advance to the rank of black belt, due to his youth. Outside of martial arts, he partook in football, motocross, and shooting.

While working on a cruise ship he met a French sailor who was also a national champion of Savate. The sailor began training Harinck in the discipline, alongside others. Harinck continued practicing Savate after arriving in South Africa. He later took up boxing after he returned to the Netherlands and also started teaching Savate in Holland. While serving in the military as a teenager, Harinck started boxing at the competitive level. At the age of seventeen he worked as a bouncer at a local Club and began a partnership with Jan Stapper, a Kyokushin instructor.

His global journeys continued after he moved to Japan where he received the Uchi-deshi instruction under numerous masters in Tokyo, Nagano and Yokohama. He also received judo and traditional jujutsu instruction from Tokyo police department. He also spent plenty of time in Taiwan, where he entered to train Chinese Kenpo in addition to karate. Eventually he traveled to Thailand where he received the rank of the grand master in Muay Thai as one of the first foreigners ever.

In 1972, he founded the Chakuriki Gym in Amsterdam, originally teaching his own style named "Chakuriki", a mixture of techniques from Kyokushin karate (in which he holds a 6th degree black belt), boxing, judo, jujutsu and wrestling which would later be known as modern contact karate or kickboxing in Holland.

Chakuriki later became a kickboxing gym as Harinck added Japanese kickboxing and Savate to his repertoire. Harinck founded the NKBB (Dutch Kickboxing Association) in 1976, the MTBN (Dutch Muay Thai Association) in 1983, the WMTA (World Muay Thai Association) and the EMTA (European Muay Thai Association) in 1984.

Harinck is one of the most famous trainers in the sport and has trained numerous world champions including Peter Aerts, Branko Cikatić, Gilbert Ballantine, Jérôme Le Banner, Badr Hari and Hesdy Gerges.

He announced his retirement in April 2013 at the age of sixty-nine. In January 2016 Thom Harinck began coaching again. He trains a group of fighters daily, that includes Hesdy Gerges. In May 2016 Harinck published his memoirs in the English language. The book is called "Thom Harinck: Godfather of Muay Thai in The West" and is co-written with Julio Punch. An updated edition was released by Amsterdam Publishers in June 2020.

== Bibliography ==
- Harinck, Thom; Punch, Julio (2020). Thom Harinck: Godfather of Muay Thai Kickboxing in the West. Amsterdam Publishers. ISBN 978-9493056619.
