= Martin Holm =

Swedish kickboxer (1976–2009)

- Born: November 27, 1976; Stockholm, Sweden
- Died: June 24, 2009 (aged 32)
- Nationality: (Sweden) Swedish
- Height: 1.87 m (6 ft 2 in)
- Weight: 103.0 kg (227.1 lb; 16.22 st)
- Division: Heavyweight
- Style: Muay Thai
- Team: Slagskeppet 1990–1999, Vallentuna Boxing Camp from 1999
- Years active: 1994–2004

Kickboxing record
- Total: 69
- Wins: 60
- By knockout: 43
- Losses: 9
- By knockout: 0
- Last updated on: June 25, 2009

Martin Holm (November 27, 1976 – June 24, 2009) was a Swedish Muay Thai kickboxer and former WMC Muaythai World Champion. In K-1 he fought against some of the biggest stars at the time, like Ernesto Hoost, Ray Sefo, Michael McDonald and Glaube Feitosa.

== Biography and career ==
When Martin Holm was seven years old, he started swimming in the local swimming school. A few years later he became interested in Aikido and practiced it for four years. Soon after he became interested in Shotokan Karate. When he was 14 he entered one of the best Muay Thai gyms in Stockholm at that time, "Slagskeppet Muay Thai," where he met Jörgen Kruth and immediately was taken by the sport.

Martin was 18 years old and vacationing in Thailand with his trainer Po Lindvall and Jörgen Kruth when he had his first fight. He was not prepared for the fight but his opponent was an experienced local Muay Thai fighter. Holm attacked hard, fired a lot of shots and won the fight by a knockout with knee strikes at the 30 second mark in the first round. In 1998 or 1999 on the advice of his first trainer Po Lindvall Martin decided to follow his training friend Jorgen Kruth to Vallentuna Boxing Camp www.vbc.se, in an attempt to get to the next level as Lindvall was leaving his trainer carrier and VBC was the most excellent promoters of fighters at that time. From Vallentuna he had some professional fights and later entered K-1 two years after Kruth.

Holm fought over 30 times for Slagskeppet and his first trainer Po Lindvall and won 4 European and 3 World titles before earning a WMC World Title match in 1999 in Thailand.

In 2002, he made his K-1 debut at the K-1 World Grand Prix 2002 in Nagoya. He knocked out Namibian Jokki Oberholtzer at 1'38" in the first round. His next fight was against Brazilian karate practitioner Glaube Feitosa. Holm won again by a first round knock out.

In 2002, in Saitama, Japan, he faced his toughest opponent yet, K-1 superstar Ray Sefo from New Zealand. Holm lost the evenly fought battle by majority decision. He finished his rookie year in K-1 at the K-1 World Grand Prix 2002 Finals undercard against Canadian Michael McDonald.

In 2003, in Paris, Holm fought against four-time K-1 World Champion Ernesto Hoost and lost by unanimous decision.

In 2004, after his fight against Albanian Xhavit Bajrami, Holm retired from fighting in order to focus on his family and newborn son.

After three years off, in January 2007, he announced he would be making his comeback to K-1.

Holm was found dead at a playground outside of his home in Täby north of Stockholm on 24 June 2009. The cause of death was suicide by hanging from a swingset. Holm had been privately struggling with depression and an emotional imbalance.

== Titles ==
- 1994 WAKO Amateur Kickboxing European Champion
- 1994 SIMTA Pro Muay Thai European Champion
- 1995 WKA Amateur Kickboxing European Champion
- 1997 WKA Amateur Kickboxing World Champion
- 1998 IAMTF Amateur Muay Thai European Champion
- 1999 IFMA Kings Cup winner
- 1999 WMC Pro Muay Thai World Champion

== Kickboxing record (incomplete) ==
Kickboxing record (incomplete)
60 wins (43 (T)KOs, 17 decisions), 9 losses
Date	Result	Opponent	Event	Location	Method	Round	Time	Record
2006-04-24	Win	(Hungary) Tibor Nagy	MARS World Fighting GP	Seoul, Korea	Decision (unanimous)	3	3:00	
2004-06-06	Loss	(Switzerland) Xhavit Bajrami	K-1 World Grand Prix 2004 in Nagoya	Nagoya, Japan	Decision (unanimous)	3	3:00	
2004-02-14	Win	(Hungary) Tibor Nagy	K-1 Scandinavia 2004 World Qualification	Solna, Sweden	Decision (unanimous)	3	3:00	
2003-12-06	Win	(South Africa) Jan Nortje	K-1 World Grand Prix 2003	Tokyo, Japan	TKO (knee to the body)	1	1:06	
2003-06-14	Loss	(Netherlands) Ernesto Hoost	K-1 World Grand Prix 2003 in Paris	Paris, France	Decision (unanimous)	3	3:00	
2003-03-15	Win	(Switzerland) Petar Majstorovic	K-1 World Grand Prix 2003 Preliminary Scandinavia	Stockholm, Sweden	Decision (unanimous)	5	3:00	
2002-12-07	Win	(Canada) Michael McDonald	K-1 World Grand Prix 2002, Reserve Fight	Tokyo, Japan	Decision (majority)	3	3:00	
2002-10-05	Loss	(New Zealand) Ray Sefo	K-1 World Grand Prix 2002 Final Elimination	Osaka, Japan	Decision (majority)	3	3:00	
Qualifies for K-1 World Grand Prix 2002 Final.
2002-07-14	Win	(Brazil) Glaube Feitosa	K-1 World Grand Prix 2002 in Fukuoka	Fukuoka, Japan	KO (punch)	1	2:20	
2002-03-03	Win	(Namibia) Jokki Oberholtzer	K-1 World Grand Prix 2002 in Nagoya	Nagoya, Japan	KO (left straight punch)	1	1:38	
2001-03-31	Win	(France) Arnaund Bonin	Thaiboxing Night Helsinki	Nagoya, Japan	TKO (corner stoppage)	2		
1999-11-?	Win	(Czech Republic) Curka	WMC 1999 Championship	Phuket, Thailand	Decision (unanimous)	5	3:00	
Won 1999 WMC Pro Muay Thai World Championship.
1999-04-02	Win	(Czech Republic) Victor Petrlik	International Sports House	Helsinki, Finland	TKO (corner stoppage)	1		
1999-03-10	Win	(Morocco)	Muay Thai event in Thailand	Bangkok, Thailand	KO (knee)	1		
1994-?-?	Win	(Thailand)	Muay Thai event in Thailand	Thailand	KO (knees)	1	0:30	
Legend: Win Loss Draw/no contest Notes

== See also ==
- List of K-1 events
- List of male kickboxers
