= Jarkko Immonen (ice hockey, born 1984) =

Finnish ice hockey player

Jarkko Antero Immonen
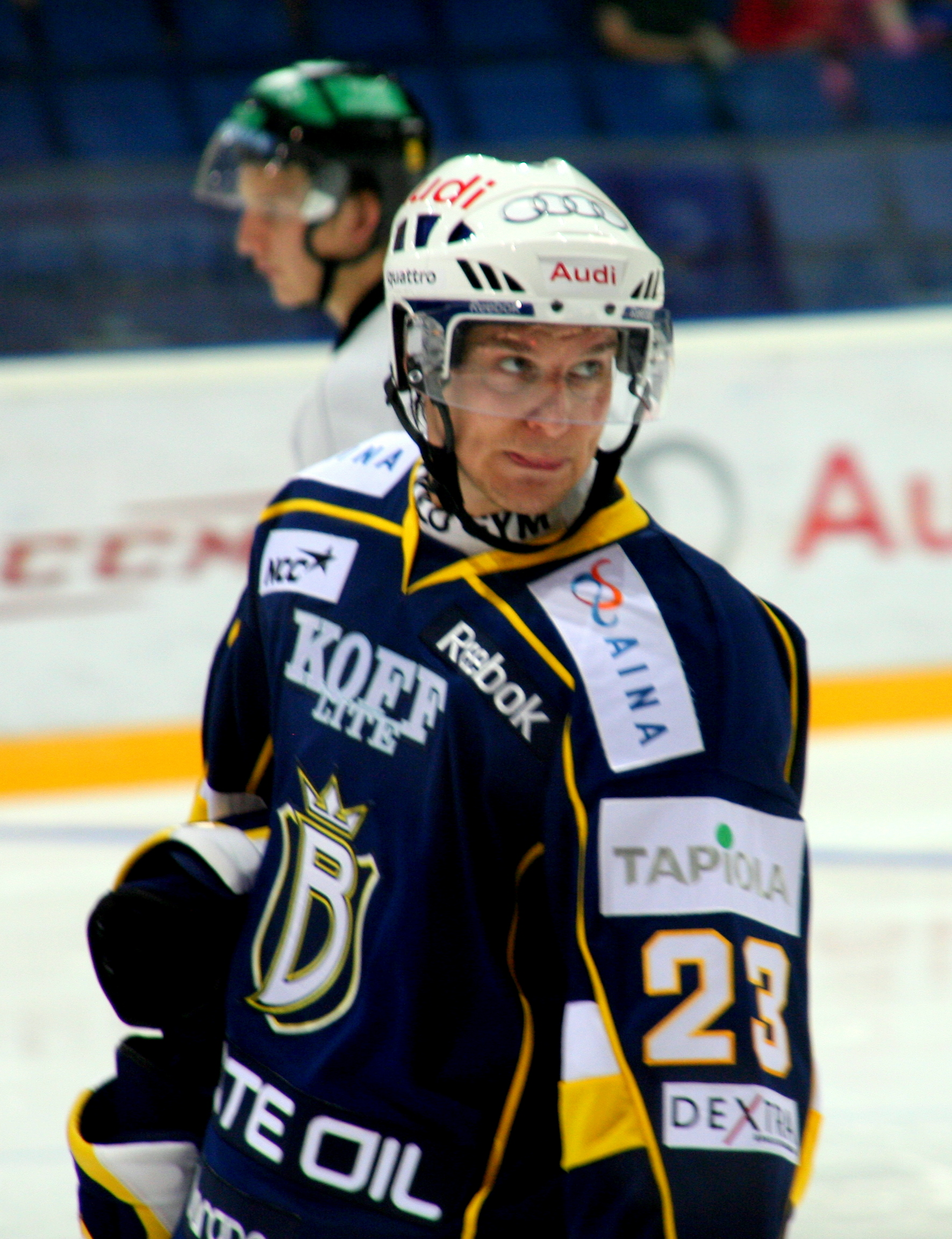
- Born: January 18, 1984 (age 42) Kouvola, Finland
- Height: 5 ft 11 in (180 cm)
- Weight: 198 lb (90 kg; 14 st 2 lb)
- Position: Forward
- Shot: Left
- Tipsport liga team Former teams: HKm Zvolen; Blues; SaiPa; Pelicans; Sport; KooKoo
- NHL draft: 110th overall, 2002; Dallas Stars
- Playing career: 2003–2018

Jarkko Antero Immonen (born January 18, 1984) is a Finnish professional ice hockey forward who is playing for HKm Zvolen in Slovakia. He was selected by the Dallas Stars in the 4th round (110th overall) of the 2002 NHL entry draft.

Midway through the 2010–11 season, on January 28, 2011, Immonen transferred from his first SM-lliga club, the Espoo Blues, to the Pelicans and signed an addition one-year contract. In the following 2011–12 season, Immonen enjoyed his most successful season win the SM-liiga since 2008, scoring 32 points in 59 games to help the Pelicans reach the finals.

On May 3, 2012, he was re-signed to a two-year extension with the Pelicans.

== Career statistics ==
=== Regular season and playoffs ===
			Regular season					Playoffs
Season	Team	League	GP	G	A	Pts	PIM	GP	G	A	Pts	PIM
2000–01	KooKoo	FIN U18	13	1	0	1	4	9	1	0	1	0
2000–01	KooKoo	FIN.2 U20	1	0	1	1	0	—	—	—	—	—
2001–02	Blues	FIN U18	1	0	1	1	2	—	—	—	—	—
2001–02	Blues	FIN U20	34	14	12	26	18	2	0	1	1	2
2002–03	Blues	FIN U20	36	21	23	44	30	10	5	4	9	6
2003–04	Blues	FIN U20	25	11	23	34	49	1	0	0	0	2
2003–04	Blues	SM-liiga	13	1	0	1	4	9	1	0	1	0
2003–04	Suomi U20	Mestis	5	2	2	4	2	—	—	—	—	—
2004–05	Blues	FIN U20	12	4	13	17	6	7	3	3	6	18
2004–05	Blues	SM-liiga	44	2	2	4	14	—	—	—	—	—
2005–06	SaiPa	SM-liiga	53	7	6	13	22	3	0	0	0	0
2006–07	SaiPa	SM-liiga	56	13	16	29	36	—	—	—	—	—
2007–08	SaiPa	SM-liiga	56	19	19	38	44	—	—	—	—	—
2008–09	SaiPa	SM-liiga	32	14	9	23	16	—	—	—	—	—
2009–10	Blues	SM-liiga	34	9	8	17	18	—	—	—	—	—
2010–11	Blues	SM-liiga	21	2	8	10	12	—	—	—	—	—
2010–11	Pelicans	SM-liiga	14	6	4	10	20	—	—	—	—	—
2011–12	Pelicans	SM-liiga	59	10	22	32	24	17	0	2	2	6
2012–13	Pelicans	SM-liiga	48	4	17	21	38	—	—	—	—	—
2013–14	Pelicans	Liiga	52	2	9	11	16	1	0	0	0	0
2014–15	Sport	Liiga	58	8	23	31	12	—	—	—	—	—
2015–16	Sport	Liiga	57	9	26	35	32	2	0	0	0	2
2016–17	KooKoo	Liiga	47	3	6	9	16	—	—	—	—	—
2017–18	HKm Zvolen	SVK	5	0	0	0	2	—	—	—	—	—
2017–18	ESV Kaufbeuren	GER.2	3	0	0	0	0	—	—	—	—	—
SM-liiga/Liiga totals			644	109	175	284	324	32	1	2	3	8

Medal record

Representing Finland

Ice hockey

World Junior Championships
Bronze medal – third place	2004 Helsinki	

=== International ===
Year	Team	Event	GP	G	A	Pts	PIM
2002	Finland	WJC18	8	2	4	6	6
2004	Finland	WJC	7	2	3	5	2
Junior totals			15	4	7	11	8
