= Kaarina Immonen =

Kaarina Immonen, a national of Finland was appointed as Deputy Special Representative in the Central African Republic by the United Nations Secretary-General Ban Ki-moon on 11 December 2012. Her new appointment also include serving as United Nations Resident Coordinator and Humanitarian Coordinator.

Prior to her appointment, Ms. Immonen served as UN Resident Coordinator to the Republic of Moldova, a position she held from June 2007 until July 2012. A veteran in the field of conflict prevention and international development, Ms. Immonen started her career at the United Nations on 2 March 1992 and had served the UNDP in a number of countries, including Cambodia, Congo, Vietnam, Kenya, South Africa, Georgia and Russia.

Ms. Immonen obtained her master's degree from the University of Geneva and the Graduate Institute of International Studies in Geneva, Switzerland.
