= Riku Immonen =

Finnish Muay Thai kickboxer

- Born: Riku Immonen; 25 January 1974 (age 52); Joensuu, Finland
- Nationality: (Finland) Finnish
- Height: 1.80 m (5 ft 11 in)
- Weight: 71 kg (157 lb; 11.2 st)
- Division: Middleweight
- Style: Muay Thai
- Team: Turku Muay Thai

Kickboxing record
- Total: 47
- Wins: 38
- By knockout: 5
- Losses: 4
- Draws: 5
- No contests: 0

Riku Immonen is a retired Finnish professional Muay Thai kickboxer and active muay thai coach. He is an amateur and professional Muay Thai World Champion. He trains fighters out of Turku Muay Thai. Most well known students are UFC fighter Makwan Amirkhani, Topi Helin and Daniel Forsberg. He trains also UFC fighter Teemu Packalen.

== Martial arts ==
Immonen trained Wrestling 6 months as a child around age of 12, but continued to play volleyball instead of wrestling. Started Muay Thai at age of 18 and stopped fighting at age of 25. He has been coaching since. Made short comeback in 2014 at age of 40 to fight singer Daniel Landa.

== Author ==
Riku Immonen has published two books in Finnish. Short humorous stories of "Adventures of Harley-Davidson man" at motorcycle forum moottoripyora.org became popular and Immonen decided to publish his first book "HD-miehen seikkailut" in 2008. It sold 10 000 copies and the second book "HD-mies ja löydetyn respektin menetys" in 2009 sold 5000 copies. First book has been translated to Estonian language. Immonen has also written articles for print magazines Fighter Magazine and FightSport.

== Titles ==
Professional

- 1999 WMC World Champion (160lbs)

Amateur

- 2001 Finland Boxing Championships (silver) -81 kg
- 1999 I.A.M.T.F. World Muay Thai World Championships in Bangkok, Thailand (gold) -71 kg
- 1998 I.F.M.A. King's Cup World Championships in Samut Prakan, Thailand (gold) -71 kg
- 1998 I.A.M.T.F. European Muay Thai Championships in Calafell, Spain (gold) -71 kg
- 1998 M.T.A.F. Finland Muay Thai Championships in Helsinki, Finland (gold) -71 kg

Awards

- 1999 Fighter of the Year - Trophy. Muay Thai Association of Finland.
- 1999 Tournament 2nd Best Fighter - Award. I.A.M.T.F. World Muay Thai World Championships in Bangkok, Thailand.
- 1998 Tournament Most Technical Fighter - Trophy. I.A.M.T.F. European Muay Thai Championships in Calafell, Spain.

== Muay thai record ==
47 Fights 38 Wins (5 (T)KO's, 33 decisions), 5 draws, 5 Losses
Date	Result	Opponent	Event	Method	Round	Notes
06/12/2014	Win	(Czech Republic) Daniel Landa	Gibu Fight Night, Prague, Czech Republic	Decision (Unanimous)	3	
11/26/1999	Win	(Australia) Luke Kempton	WMC World title fight, Helsinki Finland	Decision (Unanimous)	5	Title defend.
09/23/1999	Win	(Czech Republic) Jindrich Velecky	Pardubice, Czech Republic	Decision (Split)	5	
07/27/1999	Win	(Ukraine) Leonid Lebedev	Rangsit stadion, Bangkok	Decision (Unanimous)	5	World Muaythai Council World title fight.
03/20/1999	Win	(Australia) Luke Kempton	Suntec Singapore Convention and Exhibition Centre	KO (Head kick)	3	Professional debut.
03/13/1999	Win	(Georgia (country)) Giga Kordadze	I.A.M.T.F. World Championships, Nimibutr Stadium, Bangkok	Decision (Split)	5	Final
03/11/1999	Win	(Belarus) Sergy Karpin	I.A.M.T.F. World Championships, Nimibutr Stadium, Bangkok	Decision (Unanimous)	3	Semi-final
03/10/1999	Win	(Ukraine) Leonid Lebedev	I.A.M.T.F. World Championships, Nimibutr Stadium, Bangkok	Decision (Unanimous)	3	
03/09/1999	Win	(Thailand) Udon Bumroong	I.A.M.T.F. World Championships, Nimibutr Stadium, Bangkok	Decision (Unanimous)	3	
03/07/1999	Win	(France) Benjamin Bardissa	I.A.M.T.F. World Championships, Nimibutr Stadium, Bangkok	Decision (Unanimous)	3	
02/04/1999	Win	(Czech Republic) Vaclav Cermak	Helsinki, Finland	Decision (Unanimous)	5	
11/22/1998	Win	(Finland) Petri Kitula	Finland Muay Thai Championships in Helsinki, Finland	Decision (Unanimous)	5	Final
10/31/1998	Win	(Finland) Kai Kirkonpelto	Finland Muay Thai Championships Elimination, Turku, Finland	Decision (Unanimous)	5	Semi-final
10/12/1998	Loss	(Sweden) Abdo Nije	Stockholm, Sweden	Decision (Split)	5	
08/23/1998	Win	(France) Hamdaoui Raba	I.F.M.A. King's Cup World Championships in Samut Prakan, Thailand	KO (Low kick)	3	Final
08/21/1998	Win	(Australia) Luke Kempton	I.F.M.A. King's Cup World Championships in Samut Prakan, Thailand	Decision (Split)	5	Semi-final
08/19/1998	Win	(Moldova) Tgnata	I.F.M.A. King's Cup World Championships in Samut Prakan, Thailand	TKO (Retired)	3	
08/17/1998	Win	(New Zealand) Carl Cowley	I.F.M.A. King's Cup World Championships in Samut Prakan, Thailand	Decision (Unanimous)	5	
07/18/1998	Win	(Finland) Robert Tulonen	Kuopio Ice Hall, Finland	Decision (Unanimous)	5	
04/04/1998	Win	(Russia) Mikhail Stepanov	I.A.M.T.F. European Championships in Calafell, Spain	Decision (Split)	5	Final
04/02/1998	Win	(Ukraine) Leonid Lebedev	I.A.M.T.F. European Championships in Calafell, Spain	Decision (Unanimous)	3	Semi-final
04/01/1998	Win	(France) Philip Fereal	I.A.M.T.F. European Championships in Calafell, Spain	Decision (Unanimous)	3	
03/31/1998	Win	(Croatia) Zvonko Jakovljevic	I.A.M.T.F. European Championships in Calafell, Spain	Decision (Unanimous)	3	
03/30/1998	Win	(England) Lee Smith	I.A.M.T.F. European Championships in Calafell, Spain	Decision (Unanimous)	3	
02/28/1998	Draw	(Finland) Manu Varho	Tampere, Finland	Draw	5	
07/02/1998	Win	(Finland) Vesa Vähäniemi	Helsinki, Finland	Decision (Unanimous)	5	
11/22/1997	Draw	(Finland) Manu Varho	Helsinki, Finland	Draw	5	
11/01/1997	Win	(Finland) Vesa Vähäniemi	Turku, Finland	Decision (Unanimous)	5	
10/04/1997	Win	(Finland) Jukka Nuutinen	Helsinki, Finland	Decision (Unanimous)	5	
05/31/1997	Win	(Sweden) Freddy Lindholm	Stockholm, Sweden	KO (Body kick)	5	
05/10/1997	Draw	(Finland) Jukka Nuutinen	Helsinki, Finland	Draw	5	
03/28/1997	Win	(Czech Republic) Jindrich Velecky	Most, Czech Republic	KO (Head kick)	4	
02/12/1997	Loss	(Russia) Grigory Drozd	I.A.M.T.F. World Championships, Nimibutr Stadium, Bangkok	Decision (Split)	3	
02/10/1997	Win	(Hong Kong) Suott Beath	I.A.M.T.F. World Championships, Nimibutr Stadium, Bangkok	Decision (Unanimous)	3	
12/07/1996	Win	(Estonia) Juri Tamicovich	Joensuu, Finland	Decision (Split)	5	
05/25/1996	Loss	(Finland) Manu Varho	Ilosaari, Joensuu, Finland	Decision (Split)	5	
02/24/1996	Win	(Estonia) Leonti Vorontsuk	Tarto, Estonia	Decision (Unanimous)	5	
11/11/1995	Win	(Estonia) Sergei Haritonov	Lahti, Finland	Decision (Unanimous)	5	
05/27/1995	Draw	(Finland) Antti Kiikko	Joensuu, Finland	Draw	5	
02/24/1995	Loss	(Finland) Manu Varho	Tampere, Finland	Decision (Unanimous)	5	
06/05/1994	Loss	(Finland) Marko Laakkonen	Joensuu, Finland	Decision (Unanimous)	5	
04/05/1994	Win	(Finland) Jukka Timonen	Joensuu, Finland	Decision (Unanimous)	5	
09/14/1993	Win	(Finland) Kai Kirkonpelto	Lahti, Finland	Decision (Unanimous)	3	
08/22/1993	Win	(Finland) Jukka Timonen	Turku, Finland	Decision (Split)	3	
06/15/1993	Win	(Finland) Tapio Löfman	Hotel Julie, Joensuu, Finland	Decision (Unanimous)	3	
02/15/1993	Win	(Finland) Tapio Löfman	Turku, Finland	Decision (Unanimous)	3	
11/28/1992	Win	(Finland) Kalle Siltala	Joensuu, Finland	Decision (Split)	3	

== See also ==
- List of male kickboxers

== Sources ==
- Suomalaiset kamppailulajien tekijät, Tero Laaksonen, ISBN 9789529949434
- Muay Thai record at MTAF
- Adventures of Harley-Davidson man at Moottoripyora.org
