= Rene Rooze =

Dutch kickboxer and mixed martial arts fighter

- Born: 26 January 1969 (age 57)
- Nationality: Dutch
- Height: 6 ft 7 in (201 cm)
- Weight: 231 lb (105 kg; 16 st 7 lb)
- Division: Heavyweight
- Style: Kickboxing
- Team: Chakuriki Gym; Team Aerts

Kickboxing record
- Total: 40
- Wins: 32
- By knockout: 4
- Losses: 7
- Draws: 1

Mixed martial arts record
- Total: 9
- Wins: 5
- By knockout: 5
- Losses: 4
- By knockout: 2
- By submission: 1
- By disqualification: 1

Other information
- Mixed martial arts record from Sherdog

Rene Rooze (born 26 January 1969) is a Dutch former kickboxer and mixed martial artist.

== Biography and career ==
As a member of Team Aerts, he was an active fighter competing in mainly European events and accumulating (as of 2004) a kickboxing record of 32-7-1 with 4 KOs. Also was a holder of the European super heavyweight kickboxing title (MTBN).

After Peter Aerts split with his previous kickboxing club Chakuriki and the creation of his own Team Aerts, Rene Rooze took up the position of his cornerman. Since his retirement he has gone on to be a successful Muay Thai instructor and conditioning coach.

Rooze also competed in a number of mixed martial arts bouts and held a record of 5 wins and 4 losses. Notably, he fought the Japanese sumo wrestler Tadao Yasuda twice and knocked him out on both occasions. He lost his last MMA bout at Bushido Europe: Rotterdam Rumble against Alexander Emelianenko on 9 October 2005. He is also famous for his many fouls and misconducts.

== Kickboxing record ==
32 Wins, 7 Losses, 1 Draw'
Date	Result	Opponent	Event	Method	Round	Time	Location
15 March 2008	Loss	Errol Zimmerman	It's Showtime 75MAX Trophy Final 2008	TKO (Doctor stoppage/cut shin)	2	-	's-Hertogenbosch, Netherlands
27 January 2002	Loss	Hiromi Amada	K-1 Rising 2002	KO (Punch)	1	1:25	Shizuoka, Japan
20 May 2001	Loss	Attila Fusko	K-1 Germany Grand Prix 2001	Decision (Unanimous)	3	3:00	Oberhausen, Germany
6 May 1996	Win	Jean-Claude Leuyer	K-1 Grand Prix '96	KO (Punches)	1	1:50	Yokohama, Japan
6 June 1993	Loss	Frank Lobman	The War	KO (Punches)	3	-	Rotterdam, Netherlands

== Mixed martial arts record ==
Professional record breakdown
9 matches	5 wins	4 losses
By knockout	5	2
By submission	0	1
By disqualification	0	1

Res.	Record	Opponent	Method	Event	Date	Round	Time	Location	Notes
Loss	5–4	Alexander Emelianenko	KO (punches)	Bushido Europe: Rotterdam Rumble	9 October 2005	1	0:28	Rotterdam, Netherlands	
Loss	5–3	Josh Barnett	TKO (punches)	K-1 MMA ROMANEX	22 May 2004	1	2:15	Saitama, Japan	
Win	5–2	Tadao Yasuda	TKO (punches)	Inoki Bom-Ba-Ye 2003	31 December 2003	1	0:50	Kobe, Japan	
Win	4–2	Ivan Salaverry	TKO (dislocated finger)	K-1 Survival 2003 Japan Grand Prix Final	21 September 2003	1	2:42	Yokohama, Japan	
Win	3–2	Tadao Yasuda	KO (kick)	K-1 Andy Memorial 2001 Japan GP Final	19 August 2001	3	0:09	Saitama, Japan	
Loss	2–2	Heath Herring	DQ (excessive fouling)	2H2H 1: 2 Hot 2 Handle	5 March 2000	1	3:20	Rotterdam, Netherlands	
Win	2–1	Satoshi Honma	TKO (referee stoppage)	K-1 Hercules	9 December 1995	1	2:48	Japan	
Loss	1–1	Enson Inoue	Submission (rear naked choke)	VTJ 1995: Vale Tudo Japan 1995	20 April 1995	1	6:41	Tokyo, Japan	
Win	1–0	Andre Van Den Oetelaar	TKO (towel thrown from strikes)	CFT 1: Cage Fight Tournament 1	1 January 1995	1	2:27	Belgium	
