= K-1 World Grand Prix 2003 Final =

- Promotion: K-1
- Date: December 6, 2003
- Venue: Tokyo Dome
- City: Tokyo, Japan
- Attendance: 67,320

Event chronology
K-1 MMA in Brazil	K-1 World Grand Prix 2003 Final	K-1 Spain Grand Prix 2003 in Barcelona

K-1 World Grand Prix 2003 Final was a kickboxing event promoted by the K-1 organization. The event was held at the Tokyo Dome in Tokyo, Japan on Saturday, December 6, 2003 in front of 67,320 spectators. It was the eleventh K-1 World Grand Prix final involving ten of the world's best fighters (two being reservists). The eight finalists had almost all qualified via preliminary events, while two additional fighters were invited as reserve fighters (for more detail on this see bulleted list below), with all bouts being fought under K-1 Rules (100 kg/156-220 lbs). As well as tournament bouts there was also an 'Opening Fight' between Yusuke Fujimoto and Matthias Riccio and a 'Super Fight' between Martin Holm and Jan Nortje, both fought under K-1 Rules. In total there were fourteen fighters at the event, representing ten countries.

The considered favourite leading in was Stefan "Blitz" Leko, who was on a five-fight K-1 win streak throughout 2003, and had beaten Peter Aerts, Mike Bernardo and Francisco Filho leading up to the World Grand Prix. However, due to contractual disputes that arose prior to the tournament final, Leko was pulled out of the competition and replaced by former boxer Francois Botha. It would be a man who had previously lost to Leko that won the Grand Prix.

The tournament winner was Remy Bonjasky who defeated Musashi in the final by third round unanimous decision. Both fighters would be making their first ever K-1 World Grand Prix final appearance, with Remy Bonjasky winning on his first visit to the finals.

Qualifiers - Finalists

- Cyril Abidi - Won fight at K-1 World Grand Prix 2003 Final Elimination
- Peter Aerts- Won fight at K-1 World Grand Prix 2003 Final Elimination
- Remy Bonjasky- Won fight at K-1 World Grand Prix 2003 Final Elimination
- Francois Botha - Invitee, replaced Stefan Leko who had a contractual dispute
- Peter Graham - Won fight at K-1 World Grand Prix 2003 Final Elimination
- Alexey Ignashov - Won fight at K-1 World Grand Prix 2003 Final Elimination
- Musashi - K-1 Survival 2003 Japan Grand Prix Final winner
- Ray Sefo - Won fight at K-1 World Grand Prix 2003 Final Elimination

Qualifiers - Reservists

- Bjorn Bregy - Invitee
- Carter Williams - Invitee

== K-1 World Grand Prix 2003 Final Tournament ==
K-1 World Grand Prix 2003 Final Elimination
(South Africa) Francois Botha
(France) Cyril Abidi	DQ
(Brazil) Francisco Filho
(Germany) Stefan Leko	DEC
(Australia) Sam Greco
(Australia) Peter Graham	TKO
(United States) Bob Sapp
(Netherlands) Remy Bonjasky	DQ
(New Zealand) Ray Sefo	DEC
(United States) Carter Williams
(Belarus) Alexey Ignashov	KO
(South Africa) Mike Bernardo
(Netherlands) Peter Aerts	DEC
(Netherlands) Jerrel Venetiaan

Quarter Finals
(France) Cyril Abidi	DEC
(South Africa) Francois Botha *
(Australia) Peter Graham
(Netherlands) Remy Bonjasky	TKO
(New Zealand) Ray Sefo
(Japan) Musashi	DEC
(Belarus) Alexey Ignashov
(Netherlands) Peter Aerts	DEC

Semi Finals
(France) Cyril Abidi
(Netherlands) Remy Bonjasky	KO
(Japan) Musashi	DEC
(Netherlands) Peter Aerts

Final
(Netherlands) Remy Bonjasky	DEC
(Japan) Musashi

* Francois Botha replaced Stefan Leko in the Quarter Finals due to contractual disputes and unconfirmed "injury"

== Results ==
K-1 World Grand Prix 2003 Final Results
Opening Fight (+95 kg): K-1 Rules / 3Min. 3R Ext.1R
(Japan) Yusuke Fujimoto def. Matthias Riccio (France)
Fujimoto defeated Riccio by KO at 2:34 of the 2nd Round.
K-1 Grand Prix Reserve Fight: K-1 Rules / 3Min. 3R Ext.1R
(United States) Carter Williams def. Bjorn Bregy (Switzerland)
Williams defeated Bregy by KO (2 Knockdowns, Punch Rush) at 2:50 of the 2nd Round.
K-1 Grand Prix Quarter Finals: K-1 Rules / 3Min. 3R Ext.1R
(France) Cyril Abidi def. Francois Botha (South Africa)
Abidi defeated Botha by 3rd Round Unanimous Decision 3-0 (29-28, 30-28, 29-28).
(Netherlands) Remy Bonjasky def. Peter Graham (Australia)
Bonjasky defeated Graham by TKO (2 Knockdowns, Right Knee) at 2:58 of the 1st Round.
(Japan) Musashi def. Ray Sefo (New Zealand)
Musashi defeated Sefo by 3rd Round Majority Decision 2-0 (30-29, 30-30, 30-29).
(Netherlands) Peter Aerts def. Alexey Ignashov (Belarus)
Aerts defeated Ignashov by Extra Round Unanimous Decision 3-0 (10-9, 10-9, 10-9). After 3 rounds the judges had scored it a Decision Draw 0-0 (30-30, 30-30, 30-30).
K-1 Grand Prix Semi Finals: K-1 Rules / 3Min. 3R Ext.1R
(Netherlands) Remy Bonjasky def. Cyril Abidi (France)
Bonjasky defeated Abidi by KO (2 Knockdowns, Flying Right Knee) at 1:46 of the 1st Round.
(Japan) Musashi def. Peter Aerts (Netherlands)
Musashi defeated Aerts by 3rd Round Majority Decision 2-0 (30-30, 30-29, 30-29).
Super Fight (+95 kg): K-1 Rules / 3Min. 3R Ext.1R
(Sweden) Martin Holm def. Jan Nortje (South Africa)
Holm defeated Nortje by KO (Knee to the liver) at 1:06 of the 1st Round.
K-1 Grand Prix Final: K-1 Rules / 3Min. 3R Ext.2R
(Netherlands) Remy Bonjasky def. Musashi (Japan)
Bonjasky defeated Musashi by 3rd Round Unanimous Decision 3-0 (30-29, 30-29, 30-29).

== Trivia ==
- This is the first of three K-1 World Grand Prix's won by Remy "the Flying Gentleman" Bonjasky.
- This would start the beginning of a 7 fight win streak during the K-1 World Grand Prix by Bonjasky (which spans from the 2003 to 2005). As of 2006 only Ernesto Hoost has won that many fights in the K-1 World Grand Prix but Bonjasky's win streak started with his debut appearance in the K-1 World Grand Prix (2003) while Hoost's win streak occurred years after his K-1 World Grand Prix debut in 1993 (his streak was between 1999–2001).

== See also ==
- List of K-1 events
- List of K-1 champions
- List of male kickboxers
