= Remy Bonjasky =

Surinamese-Dutch former kickboxer

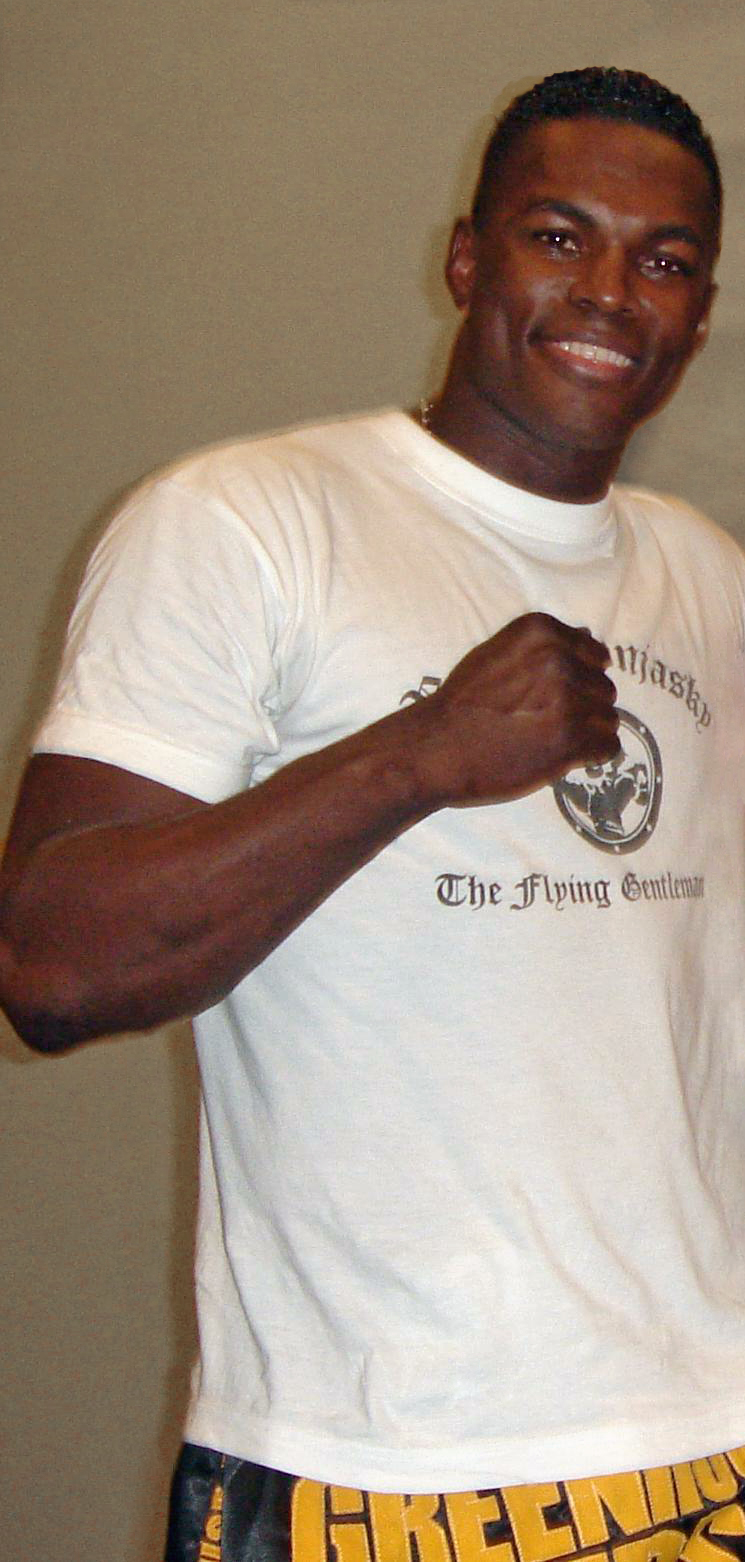
- Bonjasky in 2012
- Born: Remy Kenneth Bonjasky; January 10, 1976 (age 50); Paramaribo, Suriname
- Other names: The Flying Gentleman
- Height: 1.93 m (6 ft 4 in)
- Weight: 108 kg (238 lb; 17.0 st)
- Division: Heavyweight
- Reach: 77.0 in (196 cm)
- Style: Dutch kickboxing
- Fighting out of: Amsterdam, Netherlands
- Team: Mejiro Gym; Vos Gym
- Trainer: Andre Mannaart; Ivan Hippolyte; Eric Warmerdam
- Years active: 1995–2009, 2012–2014, 2017

Kickboxing record
- Total: 98
- Wins: 78
- By knockout: 40
- Losses: 20
- By knockout: 5

Other information
- Occupation: Owner, Bonjasky Academy
- Notable students: Danyo Ilunga
- Website: www.bonjaskyacademy.com
- Last updated on: March 8, 2014

Remy Kenneth Bonjasky (born January 10, 1976) is a Surinamese-Dutch former kickboxer. He is a three-time K-1 World Grand Prix heavyweight champion, winning the title in 2003, 2004, and 2008. He is widely considered one of the greatest kickboxers of all time. Bonjasky has been known for his flying kicks, knee attacks and strong defense, hence the nickname "The Flying Gentleman".

== Background ==
Bonjasky was born in Paramaribo, Suriname and moved to the Netherlands when he was 5 years old. Bonjasky was involved in football during his teens, but quit after breaking his leg. At the age of 18, when a friend brought him to the Mejiro Kickboxing Gym to "see who is the best", Bonjasky decided to stay and train and eventually fell in love with kickboxing. After graduating from university, Bonjasky worked as a banker at ABN Amro for a time.

== Kickboxing ==
=== Early K-1 career, World GP wins in 2003 and 2004 ===
Bonjasky had his first fight at the age of 19 against Valentijn Overeem. Bonjasky won by TKO. From this moment on he quit his job as a network operator and focused on training full-time. Despite losing his first K-1 fight by split decision he made his second fight against an established K-1 fighter, Ray Sefo, winning by TKO.

Bonjasky lost against K-1 and kickboxing superstar Stefan Leko in 2002.

On December 6, 2003 at the K-1 World Grand Prix 2003 quarter-finals in Tokyo, Japan, Bonjasky was matched up against Australian fighter Peter "The Chief" Graham. Bonjasky won the fight by a TKO in the first round. In semi-finals, Cyril Abidi fell victim of The Flying Gentleman's flying knee attacks, and after defeating Musashi in the tournament finals by unanimous decision, Bonjasky was crowned the K-1 World champion.

In 2004 he accumulated wins over Tsuyoshi Nakasako, Francois Botha, Aziz Khattou and ex-sumo champion Chad "Akebono" Rowan. If it hadn't been for his one loss in 2004 against Francisco Filho he would have beaten Semmy Schilt's record of the longest winning streak in K-1 history.

On December 4, 2004 at the K-1 World Grand Prix 2004, with three decision wins over Ernesto Hoost, Francois Botha and Musashi, Bonjasky successfully defended his K-1 WGP title.

He presented himself on November 19, 2005 for the K-1 World Grand Prix 2005 finals in Tokyo, to keep his title for a third consecutive year, but was stopped by Semmy Schilt's knee strikes in the tournament's semi-finals.

=== 2006-2007: Feud with Leko, World GP misfortunes ===
In 2006, after his divorce and change of trainers, Bonjasky came back to the K-1 World Grand Prix 2006 finals. In his quarter-final match, he got a rematch against former foe Stefan Leko, who'd beaten him in 2002, and it turned into a grudge match. When Bonjasky was champion, Leko was taking a hiatus away from K-1, and his career rise had thus stalled. Prior to his rematch with Bonjasky, he pledged that the 2006 Grand Prix would be his year to finally become the undisputed champion, at the expense of Bonjasky whom he'd beaten before. Bonjasky stated that Leko was 'limited'. In the fight, Bonjasky was hit in the groin twice in the first round, and the fight was postponed for 30 minutes. When the bout resumed, Bonjasky still managed to win the fight by a unanimous decision, after scoring a knockdown in the final minute of the fight. However, because of a persisting injury to the groin, he was not able to continue the tournament and was replaced by Peter Aerts.

In 2007, Bonjasky's mother died. He pulled out of scheduled fights with Badr Hari and Peter Aerts. His only fight before the final 16 was against Glaube Feitosa in Hawaii. Bonjasky won by decision, and remained open for the final 16 event.

On September 29, 2007, Bonjasky was booked in a rubber match with Stefan Leko at the K-1 World GP 2007 in Seoul Final 16 event. The pair went in with bad blood, as Bonjasky claimed that simply hearing the name of Leko 'made his blood boil' after their second fight, and he claimed that the groin shots he delivered were deliberate. He further lit the fuse by claiming Leko was a limited fighter, who 'only had a couple of punches and a spinning back kick, nothing else'. Leko for his part said he would be glad to prove once and for all that he was the superior fighter, which he claimed was clear from their first fight, and that Bonjasky was 'an actor', and had been 'lucky' the second fight, and had 'the heart of a chicken'.

Bonjasky won the grudge fight by TKO when the ref stopped it in the first round after landing his trademark flying knee strike. Leko beat the count, but the referee waved off the bout. Some have criticised the stoppage as K-1 protecting the by-then bigger name superstar, as Bonjasky had been their World Grand Prix champion, and that K-1 wanted him through to the later stages. Others said that Leko did not display that he still had his faculties. Regardless, the fight marked the end (as of 2011) of the feud between the two, and the win qualified Bonjasky for the K-1 World Grand Prix 2007 Finals which were held on December 8, 2007 at the Yokohama Arena in Japan.

At the K-1 World Grand Prix 2007 Finals, Bonjasky faced fellow Dutch fighter Badr Hari. He won the fight by decision. In the semi-finals he faced Dutch legend Peter Aerts, losing to Aerts in a unanimous decision.

=== Return to the top, World GP 2008 champion, later career ===
Bonjasky started off 2008 by knocking out Melvin Manhoef in Amsterdam, Bazigit Atajev in Tapei and majority decision over Paul Slowinski in the K-1 16 to qualify for his 6th Grand Prix appearance.

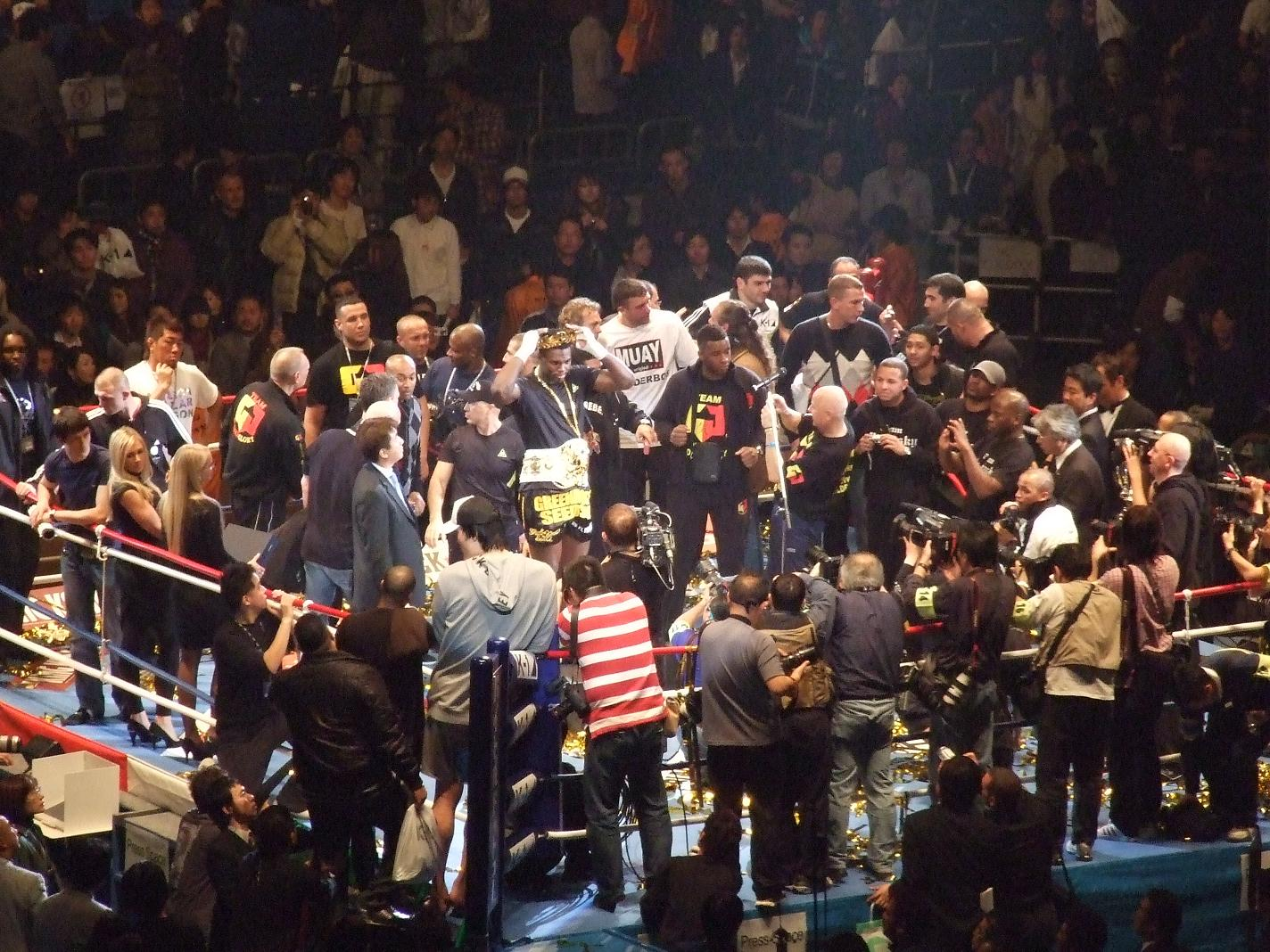
Winning the 2008 K-1 World title

In the quarter-finals he defeated Jerome Lebanner by TKO, Gokhan Saki by KO in the semi-finals, sending him to the K-1 World Grand Prix Finals for the third time against Badr Hari. After a slow start he knocked Hari down with a left hook and then went on defensive for the rest of the round. Bonjasky was hit after the bell at the end of the round by an angry Hari. In the second round Hari took Bonjasky to the ground, then punched him twice and then gave an unsportsmanlike foot stomp to Bonjasky when he was down. Bonjasky seemed unable to get up and was inspected by the ringside doctors. Meanwhile, Hari screamed at Bonjasky, telling him to get up and quarrelled with his trainer, Ivan Hippolyte. After five minutes the doctors announced Bonjasky had double vision and could not continue. Hari was therefore disqualified and Bonjasky was declared the K-1 World Grand Prix 2008 Champion. Bonjasky was disappointed by the outcome, evident from his unhappy expression after the decision was announced.

Bonjasky stated in a post-fight interview that he still had double vision and a headache the next morning. Hari, however, claimed that Bonjasky was "acting", and that, "his corner was screaming at him to stay down".

After he won his 3rd GP title, he faced Alistair Overeem. Overeem was aggressive in the 1st and dominant in the 2nd round, knocking Bonjasky down in the end of the 2nd round with a right cross, but referee Nobuaki Kakuda did not count it. In the 3rd round, Bonjasky knocked Alistair down with a flying knee and right punch combo to secure a unanimous decision win. All three judges scored the bout 30-28. It was later confirmed that Bonjasky had badly twisted his left knee two days before the fight (reason for his inactivity). He went on medical recovery, and did not fight again for months.

Bonjasky returned to training to train for the K-1 World Grand Prix 2009 Final 16. At the event he defeated Melvin Manhoef, for the third time, by unanimous decision.

At the K-1 World Grand Prix 2009 Final, Bonjasky won his third consecutive unanimous decision against Errol Zimmerman. In the semi-finals he met his nemesis Semmy Schilt. In the first round, Bonjasky landed a left hook to knock Schilt down. Schilt, however, landed a low kick to Bonjasky's left leg that was damaged in his earlier fight with Zimmerman, Bonjasky was therefore knocked out of the tournament, losing to Schilt for the third time.

Bonjasky was absent from the K-1 World Grand Prix 2010 in Yokohama tournament, and did not fight at all in 2010, and has pondered retirement after having eye surgery in August of the year. He opened his own kickboxing / muaythai gym, Bonjasky Academy, in the city of Almere in that year.

=== Comeback ===
After three years out of the ring due to an eye injury, Bonjasky faced Anderson "Braddock" Silva at Glory 2: Brussels on October 6, 2012 in Brussels, Belgium. After a close three rounds, the bout was called a draw and went into an extension round. Silva faded and allowed Bonjasky to get the better of him, coming out as the majority decision winner.

He competed in the sixteen-man 2012 Glory Heavyweight Grand Slam at Glory 4: Tokyo - 2012 Heavyweight Grand Slam in Saitama, Japan on December 31, 2012. At the opening stage, he defeated Filip Verlinden by unanimous decision, taking rounds one and three. He was then eliminated in the quarter-finals, however, when he looked lackluster against newcomer Jamal Ben Saddik and, due to the "best of three" format in the tournament, lost on points after two rounds.

He faced Tyrone Spong at Glory 5: London in London, England on March 23, 2013. Bonjasky lost in the second round via KO from a right hook.

He lost to Anderson Silva by unanimous decision in a rematch at Glory 13: Tokyo - Welterweight World Championship Tournament in Tokyo, Japan on December 21, 2013.

He defeated Mirko Cro Cop by majority decision in a rematch at Glory 14: Zagreb in Zagreb, Croatia on March 8, 2014. The fight would be his last as he announced his retirement at a pre-fight press conference in the days leading up to the bout.

In July 2017, he announced another comeback via Instagram, stating that he signed a contract with Glory kickboxing. Later that year it was announced that he would face Melvin Manhoef for the fourth time. The fight was not promoted by Glory but instead World Fighting League, a promotion founded by Melvin Manhoef, promoted the fight. The bout took place in Almere, Netherlands on October 29, 2017. Bonjasky lost the bout by decision. After the bout he announced his retirement.

== Outside the ring ==
Aside from the sport, Bonjasky has worked as a banker, network administrator, and model. One of his latest modeling acts is to be the face for the men's line of Dutch lingerie brand Sapph. He has worked for the brand since 2010 along with former swimmer Inge de Bruijn, the face for the women's line of the brand.

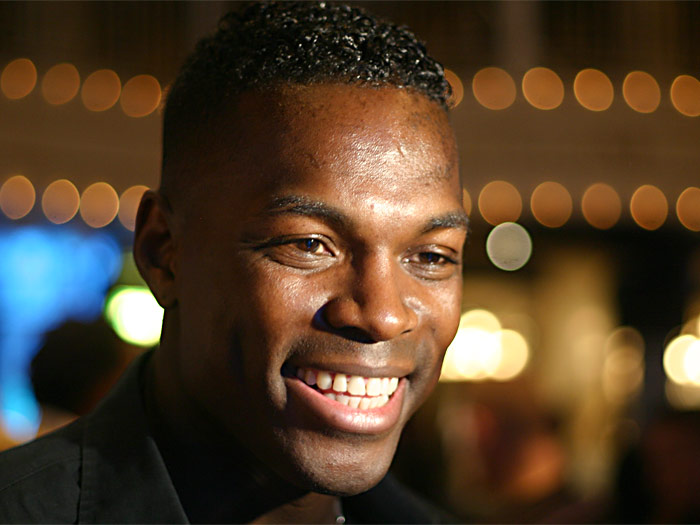
Bonjasky in 2008

In early 2011, Bonjasky appeared on Season 4 of the Sterren Dansen op het IJs show, the Dutch version of Skating with Celebrities (Dancing on Ice), performing a figure skating routine with his Sapph fellow Inge de Bruijn. It has been expected since then that he will become a TV presenter.

Bonjasky was a contestant on the 2025 television show Het Zwaard van Damocles.

=== Medal of honor ===
Bonjasky has been awarded two medals of honor since 2007.

Near the end of July 2007 in Amsterdam, he helped Dutch police in the arrest of two British criminals. The two men had shot darts at passers-by with a rifle while they were on the move in a van. Bonjasky was their last victim, and after having been hit by the dart he pursued the van in a cab and proceeded to call the police who managed to arrest the criminals. Following the arrest, Bonjasky received a medal from the Amsterdam Police Department for this courageous and honorable act.

In 2009 he was awarded the medal of honor by the city of Almere, becoming an honorary citizen of the city, after being chosen by the city's politician Arno Visser, for his accomplishments in sports.

=== Bonjasky Academy ===
Bonjasky's own kickboxing gym, Bonjasky Academy, officially opened on September 6, 2010 in Almere. The opening ceremony was attended by two TV presenters and four athletes, Quinty Trustfull, Humberto Tan, Kew Jaliens, Peter Aerts, Jerome Le Banner, and Ernesto Hoost. Bonjasky also opened a gym in Hilversum in 2020.

== Championships and accomplishments ==
=== Kickboxing ===
- Battle of Arnhem
  - Battle of Arnhem I Tournament Champion
- Black Belt Magazine
  - 2009 Full-Contact Fighter of the Year
- International Professional Muay Thai Federation
  - IPMTF European Super Heavyweight Championship (one time)
- K-1
  - 2003 K-1 World Grand Prix in Las Vegas II Champion
  - 2003 K-1 World Grand Prix Champion
  - 2004 K-1 World Grand Prix Champion
  - 2008 K-1 World Grand Prix Champion
- KO Power Tournament
  - 1998 KO Power Tournament runner-up
- World Pan Amateur Kickboxing Association
  - WPKA World Super Heavyweight Muay Thai Championship (one time)

== Kickboxing record ==
Kickboxing record (incomplete)
78 wins (40 (T)KOs, 36 decisions, 2 DQs), 20 losses
Date	Result	Opponent	Event	Location	Method	Round	Time
2017-10-29	Loss	(Suriname) Melvin Manhoef	WFL: Manhoef vs. Bonjasky, Final 16	Almere, Netherlands	Decision	3	3:00
2014-03-08	Win	(Croatia) Mirko Filipovic	Glory 14: Zagreb	Zagreb, Croatia	Decision (majority)	3	3:00
2013-12-21	Loss	(Brazil) Anderson Silva	Glory 13: Tokyo	Tokyo, Japan	Decision (unanimous)	3	3:00
2013-03-23	Loss	(Suriname) Tyrone Spong	Glory 5: London	London, United Kingdom	KO (right hook)	2	2:02
2012-12-31	Loss	(Morocco) Jamal Ben Saddik	Glory 4: Tokyo - Heavyweight Grand Slam Tournament, quarter-finals	Saitama, Japan	Decision (unanimous)	2	2:00
2012-12-31	Win	(Belgium) Filip Verlinden	Glory 4: Tokyo - Heavyweight Grand Slam Tournament, First Round	Saitama, Japan	Decision (unanimous)	3	2:00
2012-10-06	Win	(Brazil) Anderson Silva	Glory 2: Brussels	Brussels, Belgium	Decision (majority)	4	3:00
2009-12-05	Loss	(Netherlands) Semmy Schilt	K-1 World Grand Prix 2009 Final, semi-finals	Yokohama, Japan	KO (right low kick)	1	2:38
2009-12-05	Win	(Curaçao) Errol Zimmerman	K-1 World Grand Prix 2009 Final, quarter-finals	Yokohama, Japan	Decision (unanimous)	3	3:00
2009-09-26	Win	(Suriname) Melvin Manhoef	K-1 World Grand Prix 2009 Final 16	Seoul, South Korea	Decision (unanimous)	3	3:00
Qualifies for K-1 World Grand Prix 2009 Final.
2009-03-28	Win	(Netherlands) Alistair Overeem	K-1 World GP 2009 in Yokohama	Yokohama, Japan	Decision (unanimous)	3	3:00
2008-12-06	Win	(Morocco) Badr Hari	K-1 World GP 2008 Final, Final	Yokohama, Japan	DQ (illegal kick)	2	0:53
Wins K-1 World Grand Prix 2008 championship.
2008-12-06	Win	(Turkey) Gokhan Saki	K-1 World GP 2008 Final, semi-finals	Yokohama, Japan	KO (jumping mid-kick)	2	0:53
2008-12-06	Win	(France) Jérôme Le Banner	K-1 World GP 2008 Final, quarter-finals	Yokohama, Japan	TKO (arm injury)	3	1:46
2008-09-27	Win	(Poland) Paul Slowinski	K-1 World GP 2008 Final 16	Seoul, South Korea	Decision (majority)	3	3:00
Qualifies for K-1 World GP 2008 Final.
2008-07-13	Win	(Russia) Bazigit Atajev	K-1 World GP 2008 in Taipei	Taipei City, Taiwan	KO (jumping knee strike)	3	2:17
2008-04-26	Win	(Suriname) Melvin Manhoef	K-1 World GP 2008 in Amsterdam	Amsterdam, Netherlands	KO (flying high kick)	3	1:55
2007-12-08	Loss	(Netherlands) Peter Aerts	K-1 World GP 2007 Final, semi-finals	Yokohama, Japan	Decision (unanimous)	3	3:00
2007-12-08	Win	(Morocco) Badr Hari	K-1 World GP 2007 Final, quarter-finals	Yokohama, Japan	Decision (majority)	3	3:00
2007-09-29	Win	(Germany) Stefan Leko	K-1 World GP 2007 in Seoul Final 16	Seoul, South Korea	TKO (referee stoppage)	1	2:50
Qualifies for K-1 World GP 2007 Final.
2007-04-28	Win	(Brazil) Glaube Feitosa	K-1 World GP 2007 in Hawaii	Honolulu, United States	Decision (majority)	3	3:00
2006-12-02	Win	(Germany) Stefan Leko	K-1 World Grand Prix 2006, quarter-finals	Tokyo, Japan	Decision (unanimous)	3	3:00
Despite victory had to withdraw from tournament due to injury.
2006-09-30	Win	(Trinidad and Tobago) Gary Goodridge	K-1 World Grand Prix 2006 in Osaka opening round	Osaka, Japan	KO (knee strike)	3	0:52
Qualifies for K-1 World Grand Prix 2006.
2006-07-30	Win	(American Samoa) Mighty Mo	K-1 World Grand Prix 2006 in Sapporo	Sapporo, Japan	Decision (unanimous)	3	3:00
2006-05-13	Loss	(France) Jérôme Le Banner	K-1 World Grand Prix 2006 in Amsterdam	Amsterdam, Netherlands	Decision (appeal)	3	3:00
2005-12-31	Win	(United States) Sylvester Terkay	K-1 PREMIUM 2005 Dynamite!!	Tokyo, Japan	Decision (majority)	3	3:00
2005-11-19	Loss	(Netherlands) Semmy Schilt	K-1 World Grand Prix 2005	Tokyo, Japan	KO (knee strike)	1	2:08
2005-11-19	Win	(South Korea) Choi Hong-man	K-1 World Grand Prix 2005, quarter-finals	Tokyo, Japan	Decision (unanimous)	3	3:00
2005-09-23	Win	(Belarus) Alexey Ignashov	K-1 World Grand Prix 2005 in Osaka – final elimination, Super Fight	Osaka, Japan	Decision (ext. R)	4	3:00
2005-05-21	Win	(Sweden) Rickard Nordstrand	K-1 Scandinavia Grand Prix 2005	Stockholm, Sweden	Decision (unanimous)	3	3:00
2005-04-30	Loss	(American Samoa) Mighty Mo	K-1 World Grand Prix 2005 in Las Vegas	Las Vegas, United States	Decision (split)	3	3:00
2005-03-19	Win	(United States) Ray Mercer	K-1 World Grand Prix 2005 in Seoul	Seoul, South Korea	TKO (right high kick)	1	0:22
2004-12-04	Win	(Japan) Musashi	K-1 World Grand Prix 2004, Final	Tokyo, Japan	Decision (2 Ext. R)	5	3:00
Wins K-1 World Grand Prix 2004 championship.
2004-12-04	Win	(South Africa) Francois Botha	K-1 World Grand Prix 2004, semi-finals	Tokyo, Japan	Decision (unanimous)	3	3:00
2004-12-04	Win	(Netherlands) Ernesto Hoost	K-1 World Grand Prix 2004, quarter-finals	Tokyo, Japan	Decision (ext. R)	4	3:00
2004-09-25	Win	(Japan) Akebono	K-1 World Grand Prix 2004 final elimination, Super Fight	Tokyo, Japan	KO (right high kick)	3	0:33
2004-07-17	Win	(Morocco) Aziz Khattou	K-1 World Grand Prix 2004 in Seoul	Seoul, South Korea	TKO (arm injury)	2	1:59
2004-06-06	Win	(South Africa) Francois Botha	K-1 World Grand Prix 2004 in Nagoya	Nagoya, Japan	Decision (unanimous)	3	3:00
2004-05-30	Loss	(Brazil) Francisco Filho	Kyokushin vs K-1 2004 All Out Battle	Japan	Decision (unanimous)	3	3:00
2004-02-15	Win	(Japan) Tsuyoshi Nakasako	K-1 Burning 2004	Okinawa, Japan	KO (left high kick)	3	2:54
2003-12-06	Win	(Japan) Musashi	K-1 World Grand Prix 2003, Final	Tokyo, Japan	Decision (unanimous)	3	3:00
Wins K-1 World Grand Prix 2003 championship.
2003-12-06	Win	(France) Cyril Abidi	K-1 World Grand Prix 2003, semi-finals	Tokyo, Japan	KO (flying knee strike)	1	1:46
2003-12-06	Win	(Australia) Peter Graham	K-1 World Grand Prix 2003, quarter-finals	Tokyo, Japan	TKO (referee stoppage)	1	2:58
2003-10-11	Win	(United States) Bob Sapp	K-1 World Grand Prix 2003 final elimination	Osaka, Japan	DQ (punch on the ground)	2	1:20
Qualifies for K-1 World Grand Prix 2003.
2003-08-15	Win	(Canada) Michael McDonald	K-1 World Grand Prix 2003 in Las Vegas II, Final	Las Vegas, United States	Decision (ext. R)	4	3:00
Wins K-1 World GP 2003 in Las Vegas II championship and qualifies for K-1 World Grand Prix 2003 final elimination.
2003-08-15	Win	(United States) Jeff Ford	K-1 World Grand Prix 2003 in Las Vegas II, semi-finals	Las Vegas, United States	TKO (shoulder injury)	1	1:28
2003-08-15	Win	(United States) Vernon White	K-1 World Grand Prix 2003 in Las Vegas II, quarter-finals	Las Vegas, United States	KO (flying high kick)	1	1:55
2003-07-13	Loss	(Netherlands) Semmy Schilt	K-1 World Grand Prix 2003 in Fukuoka	Fukuoka, Japan	Decision (unanimous)	5	3:00
2003-03-30	Win	(Switzerland) Bjorn Bregy	K-1 World Grand Prix 2003 in Saitama	Saitama, Japan	TKO (corner stoppage)	3	1:29
2002-09-29	Win	(Netherlands) Antoni Hardonk	It's Showtime – As Usual / Battle Time	Haarlem, Netherlands	Decision (unanimous)	5	3:00
2002-08-17	Loss	(Germany) Stefan Leko	K-1 World Grand Prix 2002 in Las Vegas	Las Vegas, United States	Decision (unanimous)	3	3:00
Loses elimination fight for K-1 World Grand Prix 2003 final elimination. Will have another chance to qualify at K-1 World Grand Prix 2003 in Las Vegas II.
2002-07-14	Loss	(Croatia) Mirko Filipovic	K-1 World Grand Prix 2002 in Fukuoka	Fukuoka, Japan	TKO (high kick and punches)	2	2:06
2002-05-25	Win	(Croatia) Petar Majstorović	K-1 World Grand Prix 2002 in Paris	Paris, France	KO (right high kick)	4	0:27
2002-02-24	Loss	(Netherlands) Errol Parris	K-1 World Grand Prix 2002 Preliminary Netherlands, semi-finals	Arnhem, Netherlands	KO (left body shot)	1	1:20
2002-02-24	Win	(Netherlands) Melvin Manhoef	K-1 World Grand Prix 2002 Preliminary Netherlands, quarter-finals	Arnhem, Netherlands	Decision (unanimous)	3	3:00
2002-01-25	Win	(Ukraine) Sergei Arhipov	K-1 World Grand Prix 2002 Preliminary Marseilles	Marseille, France	TKO (corner stoppage)	5	2:00
2001-06-24	Win	(New Zealand) Ray Sefo	K-1 Survival 2001	Sendai, Japan	TKO (corner stoppage)	4	2:00
2001-02-04	Loss	(Netherlands) Jerrel Venetiaan	K-1 Holland GP 2001 in Arnhem, quarter-finals	Arnhem, Netherlands	Decision (split)	3	3:00
2000-12-12	Win	(Hungary) Péter Varga	It's Showtime - Christmas Edition	Haarlem, Netherlands	KO (jumping knee strike)	1	2:57
2000-10-22	Loss	(Netherlands) Jerrel Venetiaan	It's Showtime - Exclusive	Haarlem, Netherlands	Decision (unanimous)	5	3:00
2000-09-03	Win	(Hungary) Attila Karacs	Battle of Arnhem II	Arnhem, Netherlands	KO	1	N/A
2000-05-20	Win	(Bulgaria) Stanislav Bahchevanov	Thaiboxing - Thrill of the Year!	Amsterdam, Netherlands	KO	2	N/A
2000-03-13	Loss	(Ukraine) Sergei Arhipov	Night Club "Reaktor"	Minsk, Belarus	Decision	5	3:00
1999-10-24	Win	(Turkey) Ayhan Ozcelik	It's Showtime - It's Showtime	Haarlem, Netherlands	TKO	2	N/A
1999-09-05	Win	(Netherlands) Peter Verchuren	Battle of Arnhem I	Arnhem, Netherlands	KO	1	N/A
Wins the Battle of Arnhem I 4-man tournament.
1999-09-05	Win	(Germany) Frank Otto	Battle of Arnhem I	Arnhem, Netherlands	TKO	1	N/A
1999-06-06	Win	(France) Rani Berbachi	N/A	Netherlands	KO	2	N/A
Wins the WPKA World Super Heavyweight Muay Thai Championship.
1998-04-26	Loss	(Belarus) Alexey Ignashov	WPKL Muay Thai Fight Night	Libiąż, Poland	Decision (unanimous)	5	3:00
1998-04-14	Loss	(Netherlands) Lloyd van Dams	KO Power Tournament	Netherlands	Decision	3	3:00
1998-04-14	Win	(Netherlands) Peter Verchuren	KO Power Tournament	Netherlands	Decision	3	3:00
1997-10	Loss	(France) Achille Roger	Kickboxing Tournament Prague 1997 Semi-finals	Prague, Czech Republic	Decision	4	2:00
1997-10	Win	(Czech Republic) Pavel Majer	Kickboxing Tournament Prague 1997 Quarter-finals	Prague, Czech Republic	Decision	4	2:00
1995	Win	(Netherlands) Valentijn Overeem	Vini Vidi Vici	Netherlands	TKO (corner stoppage)	2	N/A
Legend: Win Loss Draw/no contest Notes
