= Kaoklai Kaennorsing =

Thai kickboxer

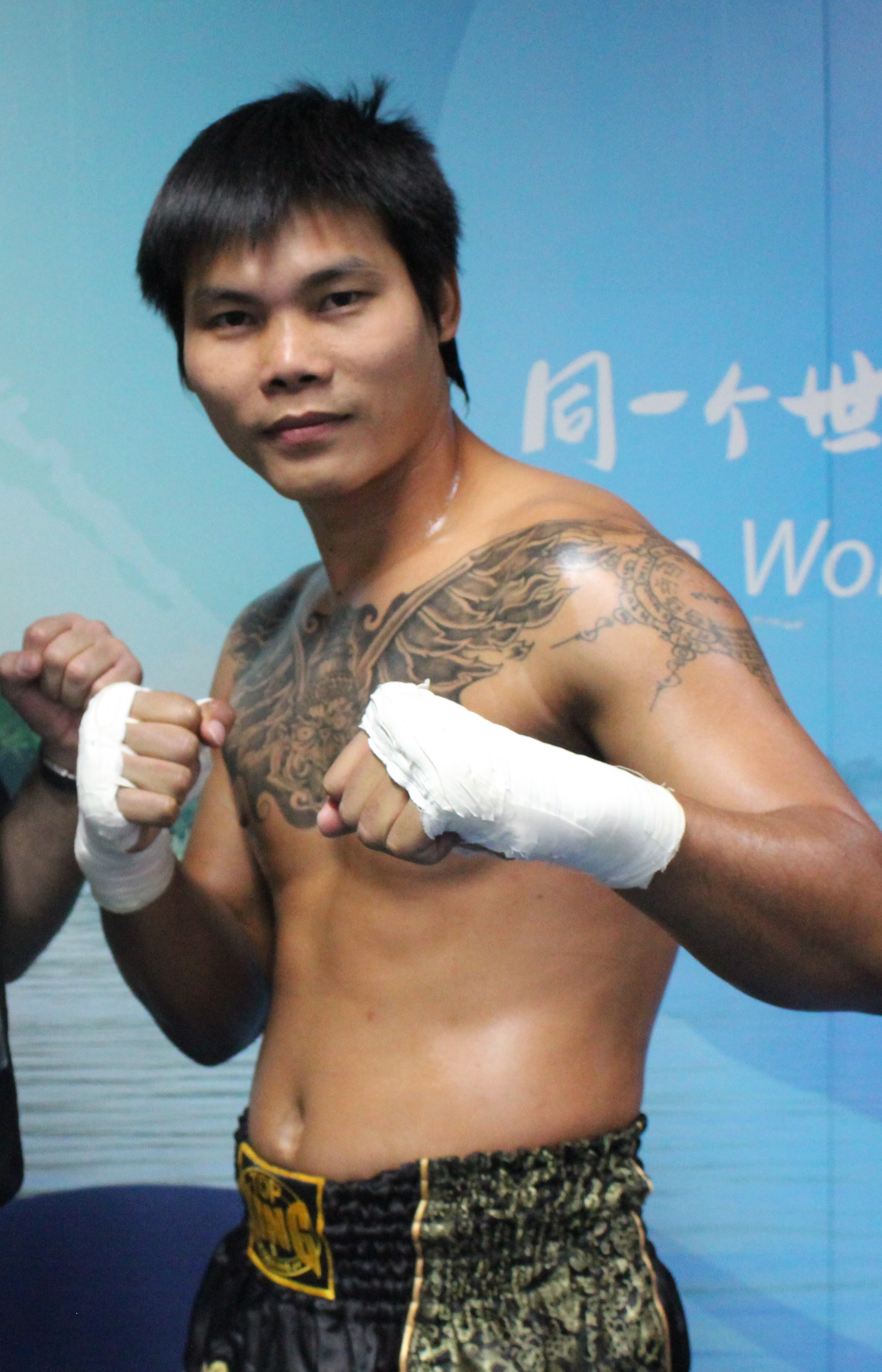
- Kaoklai in 2012
- Born: Athit DamKam (อาทิตย์ ดำขำ); September 13, 1983 (age 43); Khon Kaen, Thailand
- Native name: ก้าวไกล แก่นนรสิงห์
- Other names: Matrix Defense; Giant Killer
- Height: 1.80 m (5 ft 11 in)
- Weight: 79 kg (174 lb; 12.4 st)
- Division: Welterweight; Middleweight; Light Heavyweight; Cruiserweight
- Fighting out of: Bangkok, Thailand
- Team: Kaoklai Studio; Evolve MMA; Jocky Gym; Ihara Dōjō
- Years active: 2001–2012

Professional boxing record
- Total: 7
- Wins: 1
- Losses: 6
- By knockout: 5

Kickboxing record
- Total: 133
- Wins: 88
- By knockout: 15
- Losses: 40
- Draws: 5

Other information
- Boxing record from BoxRec
- Last updated on: March 16, 2012

Kaoklai Kaennorsing (Thai: ก้าวไกล แก่นนรสิงห์; born September 13, 1983) is a former Thai light heavyweight Muay Thai fighter. Kaennorsing is the K-1 World Grand Prix 2004 in Seoul tournament winner, former two-division Rajadamnern Stadium champion, and former WBC Muay Thai Light Heavyweight Champion.

At the time of his K-1 debut, on July 17, 2004, in Seoul, Kaoklai weighted 78 kg (172 lb; 12.3 st), the lightest and youngest fighter ever to win a K-1 Openweight tournament. Kaoklai means in Thai "to have a good future".

Kaoklai is currently an instructor of Muay Thai at Kaoklai Studio in Singapore.

== Biography ==
=== Early life ===
Kaoklai Kaennorsing was born as Athit DamKam in the heart of Northeastern Thailand, in the city of Khon Kaen. He became a student of Jockey Gym and started training Muay Thai at the age of eight. He had his first fight a year later, which he lost by points decision. After graduating junior high school for three years, he devoted himself to train Muay Thai.

=== Winning Rajadamnern Stadium titles ===
On March 31, 2001, Kaoklai fought against Kozo Takeda in Japan. Takeda just won the title of Rajadamnern Stadium at welterweight on January 21. Kaoklai knocked down Takeda with right middle kick to his temple at 1R, but he started getting damaged with right low kicks. Takeda knocked down Kaoklai with a right low kick during 3R, and Kaoklai lost by the unanimous decision at 5R.

In September 2002, at the age of 19, Kaoklai fought against Charnvit Kiat T.B.Ubol for the vacant title of Rajadamnern Stadium championship at welterweight. Kaoklai won by decision at 5R, and he won one of the most prestigious belts in Muay Thai. Although Kaokalai defeat Charnvit before, he failed to defend his title from the same fighter in 2002, and he lost his first title.

On December 13, he participated the championship against Chalermsak Chuwatthana for the vacant title of Rajadamnern Stadium at Super welterweight. He won by the unanimous decision, and succeeded to win the titles in two different weight divisions.

In 2003, Kaoklai fought against Yokkao Borchorror2 to defend his title, but he lost by unanimous decision, and lost his title again.

On October 20, 2002, Kaoklai fought against Toshio Matsumoto in Japan, but he lost by the unanimous decision at 5R. After this bout, the Thai promoter protested and asserted that the judges did not consider Kaoklai's technics of neck wrestling, clinching and knee strikes. In result, this bout was decided as no contest and Shinichi Ihara, the president of SNKA, announced that SNKA is going to promote rematch in Thailand. Later, the rematch was canceled, and it was promoted next year in Japan.

On March 30, 2003, Kaoklai fought against Lamsongkram Sauna-Harnjawe, currently known as Lamsongkram Chuwattana. He won by TKO.

On October 12, Kaoklai had a rematch against Toshio Matsumoto in Japan. During 1R, he knocked down Matsumoto with right cross, but he was knocked out with punches at 2R.

=== Winning K-1 Asia GP 2004 ===
Kaoklai made his K-1 debut on July 17, 2004, at the Asian qualification Grand Prix, held in Seoul, Korea. He started the night with a quick right punch knockout win over Denis Kang in the quarterfinals. In the semis, he met Tsuyoshi Nakasako from Japan and earned a unanimous decision victory, sending him to the finals against Shingo Koyasu. Kaoklai won the evenly fought battle in the extra round, collected 60 million ₩ and advanced to K-1 World GP 2004 Final Elimination, held in Nippon Budokan Arena, Tokyo, Japan.

His opponent at the Final Elimination was Belarusian kickboxer Alexey Ignashov. Having to overcome 80 lb (36 kg) weight and 8 in height disadvantage Kaoklai's quick, hit-and-run strategy started to paying off at the end of second round. Ignashov was issued two yellow cards for inactiveness throughout the fight, and the judges scored the fight after one extra round by a split decision in Kaoklai's favor. Kaoklai is being called "Matrix defense" because his defense skills looked like Neo from the movie of The Matrix.

On December 4, 2004, Kaoklai was the youngest and the lightest fighter ever to compete in the 12th annual K-1 World GP Championships, held in Tokyo Dome, Japan. His opponent, American slugger Mighty Mo, the winner of Las Vegas GP, was the heaviest at 280 lb (130 kg). Kaoklai started the fight cautiously circling the American, tossing in hard low kicks. At the end of the first round Kaoklai landed a lightning-quick jumping right high kick which connected flush to the head of Mo sending him unconscious to the canvas. This KO win over MO would not only send Kaoklai to the semifinals but earn him the nickname "Giant Killer". His amazing run in K-1 Finals came to an end however against Musashi by a closely contested extra round unanimous decision.

On March 19, 2005, Kaoklai entered the Korean World GP as a defending champion. He beat Qinjun Zhang in quarterfinals and Hiraku Hori in semis, before facing a 2.18 m (7 ft 2 in) and 162 kg (357 lb; 25 st 7 lb) former Korean Ssireum wrestling champion, Hongman Choi in finals. Choi more than doubled Kaoklai's weight and towering a 1-foot-3-inch (0.38 m) above the defending champion. Kaoklai was unable to overcome the disadvantage this time and lost the fight by unanimous decision after an extra round. After this loss, Kaoklai started suffering more losses than wins.

On December 18, 2005, Kaoklai participated local event of SNKA in Yamanashi to fight against Moroccan kickboxer "Prince" Hamid Boujaoub who live in Australia. He won by the unanimous decision with 30–26.

On February 9, 2006, Kaolai challenged Lamsongkram Chuwattana for his Rajadamnern Stadium at Middleweight. He was in the lead from the start until 3R, but he suddenly lost his stamina during 4R. In result, Lamsongkram came from behind and won the bout because he made up his score at 4R and 5R.

=== Winning world titles ===
On June 20, 2008, Kaoklai participated kickboxing event in Jamaica to fight against Clifton Brown from Canada for the vacant title of IKKC Muay Thai World Cruiserweight Championship. Kaoklai won by the split decision after 5R, and won the first world title in his career even if it was nameless title.

Kaoklai was rated as #7 at Light heavyweight of WBC Muay Thai in 2010. On March 14, 2010, Kaoklai fought against Magnum Sakai who was rated as #16 from Japan for the vacant title of WBC Muay Thai World Light heavyweight championship in El Monte, California, United States. Kaoklai knocked down Sakai twice with left hook and left elbow strike at 2R, and knocked out Sakai with right elbow strike at 3R.

Kaoklai was expected to rematch Simon Marcus at Muaythai Superfight on May 13, 2013 and was replaced by Suriya Prasarthinphimai.

Kaoklai has not fought since December 31, 2012.

== Titles ==
- WBC Muaythai
  - 2010 WBC Muaythai Light Heavyweight (175 lbs) World Champion
- International Karate Kickboxing Council (IKKC)
  - 2008 IKKC Muay Thai World Cruiserweight (200 lbs) Champion
- K-1
  - 2007 K-1 Rules Heavyweight Tournament in Turkey Runner Up
  - 2005 K-1 World Grand Prix in Seoul Runner Up
  - 2004 K-1 World Grand Prix Final 3rd Place
  - 2004 K-1 World Grand Prix in Seoul Champion
- Rajadamnern Stadium
  - 2003 Rajadamnern Stadium Super Welterweight (154 lbs) Champion
  - 2002 Rajadamnern Stadium Welterweight (147 lbs) Champion

== Kickboxing record ==
Professional kickboxing record
88 wins (15 KOs), 40 losses, 5 draws, 1 no contest
Date	Result	Opponent	Event	Location	Method	Round	Time
2012-12-31	Loss	(China) Fang Bian	Wu Lin Feng	Henan, China	Decision	3	3:00
2012-03-16	Loss	(Canada) Simon Marcus	Suk Wan Muaythai Naikhanomtom	Bangkok, Thailand	Decision (unanimous)	5	3:00
For the WPMF World Light Heavyweight (79 kg; 174 lb) Championship.
2011-10-21	Loss	(United States) Joe Schilling	M-One "Team Thailand vs. Team America"	Los Angeles, California, USA	TKO (referee stoppage)	1	2:43
The bout was for the vacant WBC Muaythai interim World Light heavyweight (175 pounds; 79 kg) title.
2011-10-08	Win	(Italy) Roberto Cocco	Muaythai Premier League: Round 2	Padua, Italy	Decision (unanimous)	5	3:00
2011-09-15	Loss	(China) Aotegen Bateer	Fist of legend-International tournament fight	Shandong, China	Decision	3	3:00
2011-07-23	Win	(United States) Cyrus Washington	Thailand Versus Challenger Series 2011	Bangkok, Thailand	TKO (referee stoppage)	3	
2011-06-18	Loss	(Russia) Ivan Pentka	China Fight Night	China	Decision	3	3:00
2011-02-23	Loss	(Russia) Artem Levin	Martial Arts Festival "For Russia"	Chelyabinsk, Russia	Decision	5	3:00
Loses his WBC Muaythai World Light heavyweight (175 pounds; 79 kg) title.
2010-11-14	Win	(Germany) Marco Aschenbrenner	Thailand vs Challenger series "Thailand vs Germany"	Ulm, Germany	TKO (referee stoppage)	1	3:00
2010-08-21	Win	(France) Manu N'toh	WCK Full Rules Muaythai Championship Event	Haikou, China	Decision (unanimous)	5	3:00
2010-06-04	Win	(France) Aurelien Duarte	Muaythaitv Trophy et Ultimate Thai 5	Paris, France	KO (right overhand)	1	
2010-03-14	Win	(Japan) Magnum Sakai	MTAA Muaythai Extravaganza	El Monte, California, United States	KO (left elbow strike)	3	1:20
Wins vacant WBC Muaythai World Light heavyweight (175 pounds; 79 kg) title.
2010-01-16	Win	(Slovakia) Erik Kosztanko	Thailand vs Challenger Series, Royal Paragon Hall	Bangkok, Thailand	Decision	5	3:00
2009-12-19	Loss	(China) Bian Maofu	Chinese Kung Fu vs Muaythai, Lingnan Pearl Stadium	Foshan, China	Decision	5	3:00
2009-11-27	Loss	(South Korea) Hyun-man Myung	The Khan 2	Seoul, South Korea	Decision (unanimous)	3	3:00
2009-10-16	Loss	(Croatia) Emil Zoraj	Return of the Gladiators	Brno, Czech Republic	Decision (unanimous)	3	3:00
2009-06-26	Loss	(Canada) Clifton Brown	CCGI's "Champion of Champions 2"	Montego Bay, Jamaica	Decision (unanimous)	5	3:00
The bout was for Brown's WMC World Super Light Heavyweight (182 pounds; 83 kg) title.
2008-06-20	Win	(Canada) Clifton Brown	WCK: World Championship Muay Thai "Champions of Champions"	Montego Bay, Jamaica	Decision (split)	5	3:00
Wins Brown's IKKC Muaythai World Cruiserweight title.
2008-03-30	Loss	(South Africa) Francois Botha	The Khan 1	Seoul, South Korea	Decision	3	3:00
2008-03-08	Draw	(Morocco) Khalid Bourdif	Fight Night in Düsseldorf	Düsseldorf, Germany	Decision	5	3:00
2008-01-18	Win	(South Korea) Seoung-hun Kim	FG Fighting Championship 2008	Seoul, South Korea	Decision	3	3:00
2007-10-16	Win	(South Korea) Yong-soo Choi		Seoul, South Korea	Decision	3	3:00
2007-06-22	Loss	(Australia) Nathan Corbett	Xplosion 10	Gold Coast, Australia	KO	2	2:48
2007-05-06	Loss	(Netherlands) Vincent Vielvoye	SLAMM "Nederland vs Thailand III"	Haarlem, Netherlands	Decision (unanimous)	5	3:00
2007-02-18	Win	(South Korea) Yong-soo Park	K-1 Fighting Network KHAN 2007 in Seoul	Seoul, South Korea	Decision (unanimous)	4(Ex.1)	3:00
2007-01-13	Loss	(Russia) Magomed Magomedov	K-1 Rules Heavyweight Tournament 2007 in Turkey Final	Istanbul, Turkey	KO (knee strike)	1	2:59
The bout was for K-1 Rules Heavyweight Tournament 2007 in Turkey Championship.
2007-01-13	Win	(Albania) Azem Maksutaj	K-1 Rules Heavyweight Tournament 2007 in Turkey Semi-final	Istanbul, Turkey	Decision (unanimous)	4(Ex.1)	3:00
2006-10-01	Loss	(Suriname) Tyrone Spong	SLAMM "Nederland vs Thailand II"	Almere, Netherlands	KO (right overhand)	1	1:56
2006-06-03	Loss	(Japan) Tsuyoshi Nakasako	K-1 World Grand Prix 2006 in Seoul Quarter-final	Seoul, South Korea	Decision (unanimous)	3	3:00
2006-04-28	Draw	(Japan) Hiromi Amada	SNKA Titans 3rd	Shibuya, Tokyo, Japan	Decision	3	3:00
2006-02-09	Loss	(Thailand) Lamsongkram Chuwattana	Rajadamnern Stadium	Bangkok, Thailand	Decision (unanimous)	5	3:00
The bout was for Lamsongkram's Rajadamnern Stadium Middleweight title.
2005-12-18	Win	(Morocco) Hamid Boujaoub	SNKA "Kōfu Event -Miyagawa Dojo Final 2005-"	Kōfu, Yamanashi, Japan	Decision (unanimous)	3	3:00
2005-10-12	Loss	(Japan) Yoshihiro Sato	K-1 World MAX 2005 Champions' Challenge	Shibuya, Tokyo, Japan	Decision (majority)	3	3:00
2005-09-23	Loss	(New Zealand) Ray Sefo	K-1 World Grand Prix 2005 in Osaka - Final Elimination	Osaka, Osaka, Japan	Decision (unanimous)	3	3:00
2005-08-22	Win	(Japan) Tsuyoshi Nakasako	SNKA "Titans 2nd"	Shibuya, Tokyo, Japan	Decision (unanimous)	3	3:00
2005-03-19	Loss	(South Korea) Hongman Choi	K-1 World Grand Prix 2005 in Seoul Final	Seoul, South Korea	Decision (unanimous)	4(Ex.1)	3:00
The bout was for K-1 Asia GP 2005 Tournament.
2005-03-19	Win	(Japan) Hiraku Hori	K-1 World Grand Prix 2005 in Seoul Semi-final	Seoul, South Korea	Decision (unanimous)	3	3:00
2005-03-19	Win	(China) Zhang Qingjun	K-1 World Grand Prix 2005 in Seoul Quarter-final	Seoul, South Korea	Decision (unanimous)	3	3:00
2004-12-04	Loss	(Japan) Musashi	K-1 World Grand Prix 2004 Semi-final	Bunkyo, Tokyo, Japan	Decision (unanimous)	4(Ex.1)	3:00
2004-12-04	Win	(American Samoa) Mighty Mo	K-1 World Grand Prix 2004 Quarter-final	Bunkyo, Tokyo, Japan	KO (right high kick)	1	2:40
2004-11-06	Draw	(South Africa) Mike Bernardo	SNKA & K-1 "Titans 1st"	Kitakyūshū, Fukuoka, Japan	Decision (1–0)	3	3:00
2004-09-25	Win	(Belarus) Alexey Ignashov	K-1 World Grand Prix 2004 Final Elimination	Chiyoda, Tokyo, Japan	Decision (split)	4(Ex.1)	3:00
2004-07-17	Win	(Japan) Shingo Koyasu	K-1 World Grand Prix 2004 in Seoul Final	Seoul, Korea	Decision (unanimous)	5(Ex.2)	3:00
Wins K-1 Asia GP 2004 Tournament.
2004-07-17	Win	(Japan) Tsuyoshi Nakasako	K-1 World Grand Prix 2004 in Seoul Semi-final	Seoul, Korea	Decision (majority)	3	3:00
2004-07-17	Win	(Canada) Denis Kang	K-1 World Grand Prix 2004 in Seoul Quarter-final	Seoul, Korea	KO (right hook)	1	1:48
2004-05-21	Win	(Australia) Aaron Boyes	Ocean City Promotion	New Zealand	Decision	5	3:00
2004-05-17	Loss	(Thailand) Yokkao BorChorRor2	Daorungchujarean Fights, Rajadamnern Stadium	Bangkok, Thailand	Decision	5	3:00
2004-03-11	Win	(Thailand) Taweesap Petchphutong	Rajadamnern Stadium	Bangkok, Thailand	KO	5	3:00
2004-02-01	Loss	(Thailand) Changpuek Chor.Siprasert	Petchmahanak Fights, Rajadamnern Stadium	Bangkok, Thailand	TKO	2	
2004-01-01	Win	(Thailand) Saisilak Tor.Charnthunyakarn	SUK Daorungchujarean+Charumuean, Rajadamnern Stadium	Bangkok, Thailand	Decision	5	3:00
2003-12-03	Win	(Thailand) Chalermsak Chuwatthana	SUK Yodmuay UBC, Nakormpathom Stadium	Nakhon Pathom, Thailand	Decision	5	3:00
2003-10-12	Loss	(Japan) Toshio Matsumoto	SNKA "Magnum 3"	Bunkyō, Tokyo, Japan	KO (punches)	2	1:09
2003	Loss	(Thailand) Yokkao BorChorRor2	Rajadamnern Stadium	Bangkok, Thailand	Decision	5	3:00
Loses Rajadamnern Stadium Super welterweight title.
2003-05-26	Win	(Sudan) Zakaria Faisal	Rajadamnern Stadium	Bangkok, Thailand	Decision	5	3:00
2003-04-30	Loss	(Thailand) Saketdaw KT Gym	Rajadamnern Stadium	Bangkok, Thailand	Decision (unanimous)	5	3:00
2003-03-30	Win	(Thailand) Lamsongkram Sauna-Harnjawe	Rajadamnern Stadium	Bangkok, Thailand	TKO	3	
2002-12-13	Win	(Thailand) Chalermsak Chuwatthana	SUK Yodmuaylok Kratingdaeng	Bangkok, Thailand	Decision	5	3:00
Wins vacant Rajadamnern Stadium Super welterweight title.
2002	Loss	(Thailand) Charnvit Kiat Tor.Bor.Ubon	Rajadamnern Stadium	Bangkok, Thailand	Decision	5	3:00
Loses title of Rajadamnern Stadium Welterweight Championship.
2002-10-20	NC	(Japan) Toshio Matsumoto	SNKA "Road To Muay-Thai 2002"	Bangkok, Thailand	Decision (unanimous)	5	3:00
The bout was decided as Matsumoto's victory by a unanimous decision at first, but it was changed to no contest because Thai promoter protested.
2002-09	Win	(Thailand) Charnvit Kiat Tor.Bor.Ubon	Rajadamnern Stadium	Bangkok, Thailand	Decision	5	3:00
Wins vacant title of Rajadamnern Stadium Championship at Welterweight.
2001-03-31	Loss	(Japan) Kozo Takeda	SNKA "Real Champion Appearance"	Bunkyō, Tokyo, Japan	Decision (unanimous)	5	3:00
2000-04-09	Win	(Japan) Susumu Daigūji	Rajadamnern Stadium	Bangkok, Thailand	Decision	5	3:00
2000-03-09	Win	(Thailand) Thapjakrin Tansalingkran	Rajadamnern Stadium	Bangkok, Thailand	Decision	5	3:00

== Professional boxing record ==
Professional boxing record
7 fights, 1 win, 6 losses
Date	Result	Opponent	Location	Method	Round	Time
2004-04-06	Win	(Japan) Hiroyuki Yoshino	Bunkyō, Tokyo, Japan	Decision (majority)	10	3:00
2003-09-05	Loss	(Japan) Takashi Fushiki	Osaka, Osaka, Japan	Technical decision (majority)	4	0:45
2003-03-10	Loss	(South Korea) Hwan-young Park	Seoul, South Korea	KO	4	2:08
The bout was for the vacant interim title of PABA Welterweight Championship.
2002-07-29	Loss	(Japan) Naotaka Hozumi	Bunkyō, Tokyo, Japan	KO	4	2:10
2002-05-28	Loss	(Japan) Yoshihiro Araki	Osaka, Osaka, Japan	KO	2	2:47
2002-02-11	Loss	(Japan) Kenji Satō	Bunkyō, Tokyo, Japan	KO	3	1:58
2001-08-16	Loss	(Japan) Shunsuke Itō (Shun Morita)	Bunkyō, Tokyo, Japan	KO	2	1:38
Legend: Win Loss Draw/no contest Notes

== See also ==
- List of male kickboxers
- List of K-1 events

Sporting positions
Preceded by Bassam Chahrour	2nd WBC Muay Thai World Light heavyweight Champion; March 14, 2010 – February 23, 2011	Succeeded by Artem Levin
