= Michael McDonald (kickboxer) =

English kickboxer

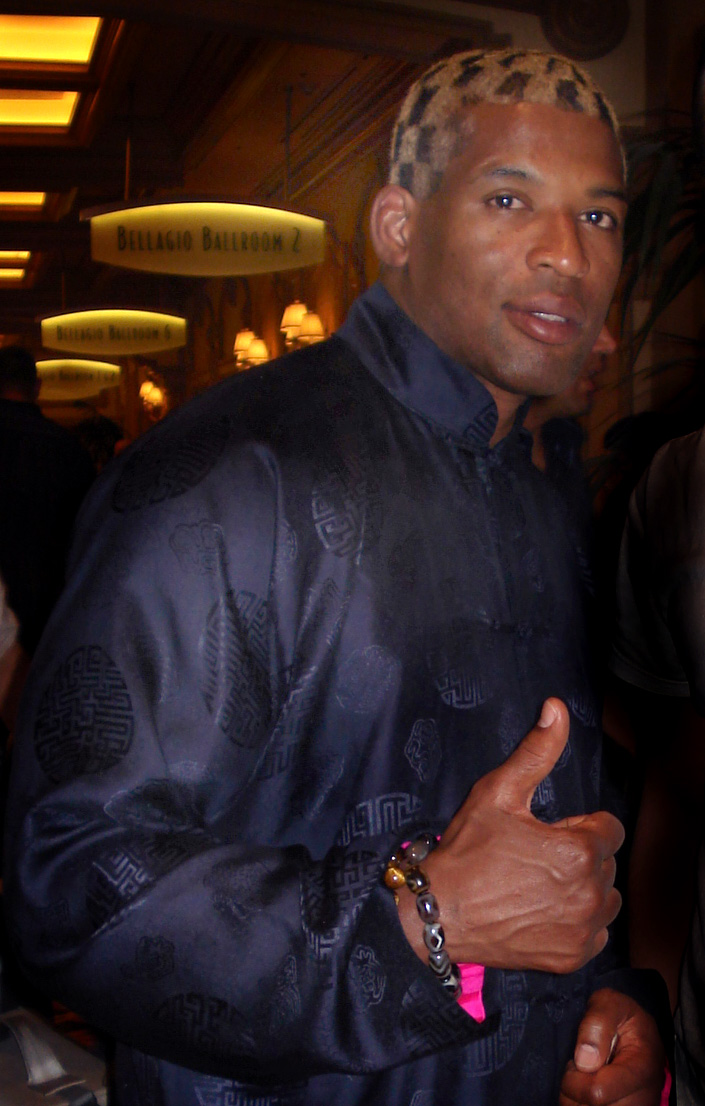
- Born: Michael Anthony McDonald; February 6, 1965 (age 61); Birmingham, England
- Other names: The Black Sniper
- Nationality: Canadian
- Height: 5 ft 11 in (1.80 m)
- Weight: 211 lb (96 kg; 15 st 1 lb)
- Division: Light Heavyweight; Cruiserweight; Heavyweight
- Style: Kickboxing, Muay Thai
- Fighting out of: Vancouver, British Columbia, Canada
- Team: Team Sniper (2000-2008); Team Wolves (2004); Team Andy (1996-2000)
- Years active: 1986–2008 (Kickboxing); 2004, 2008 (MMA); 1991-1992, 1996 (Boxing)

Professional boxing record
- Total: 3
- Wins: 2
- Losses: 1

Kickboxing record
- Total: 77
- Wins: 52
- By knockout: 20
- Losses: 24
- By knockout: 10
- Draws: 1

Mixed martial arts record
- Total: 2
- Wins: 1
- By decision: 1
- Losses: 1
- By submission: 1

Other information
- Occupation: Personal trainer
- Boxing record from BoxRec
- Mixed martial arts record from Sherdog
- Last updated on: January 10, 2024

Michael Anthony McDonald (born February 6, 1965) is a Canadian retired heavyweight kickboxer. Nicknamed "the Black Sniper", he is the former three-time K-1 USA Grand Prix Champion.

== Early life ==
Michael was born in Birmingham to a Jamaican family, he was raised in Mandeville, Jamaica until age ten when his family later immigrated to Canada, he grew up in Edmonton, Alberta during his school years. While growing up Michael was active in a variety of sports including track and field, football, soccer, baseball and wrestling. At the age of 17 a friend introduced him to Muay Thai.

== K-1 career ==
In 1996 Michael entered the K-1 fighting network and started to train with the 1992 Karate World Cup Champion, Andy Hug. He stayed with "Team Andy" for 3 years fighting in the K-1 Grand Prix throughout the world.

In 2000 Michael stunned a crowd of 35,000 at the K-1 World Grand Prix 2000 in Fukuoka by winning a unanimous decision over the heavily favored Nicholas Pettas. In 2002, Michael won both K-1 tournaments held in that year in United States, K-1 USA Grand Prix 2002 and K-1 World Grand Prix 2002 in Las Vegas. On December 7, 2002, he was selected for K-1 World Grand Prix 2002 Finals first reserve fight against Martin Holm.

In 2004 he re-claimed the K-1 USA 2004 North American Grand Prix Championship. He was knocked down by Marvin Eastman in the first round of the quarter-finals, but got up and dispatched his opponent with a KO in the second round. Scoring another second-round KO in the semi-final against Kelly Leo, McDonald advanced to the final. In front of a packed house of 6,000 fans at The Bellagio in Las Vegas, Michael dispatched Dewey Cooper to win the title for the third time in three years. The award was presented to McDonald by Muhammad Ali accompanied by Mike Tyson.

On August 12, 2006, he returned to Las Vegas for fifth time to re-claim the title. He won first two fights over Ariel Mastov and Imani Lee and reached the tournament finals once again but lost the title fight against Stefan Leko.

== Mixed martial arts career ==
Michael has had two mixed martial arts fights, first against Lyoto Machida where he lost by submission (forearm choke) and next fight against fellow kickboxer Rick Roufus where he won by unanimous decision.

== Titles ==
- 2006 K-1 World Grand Prix in Las Vegas II runner-up
- 2004 K-1 World Grand Prix in Las Vegas I Champion
- 2003 K-1 World Grand Prix in Las Vegas II runner-up
- 2002 K-1 World Grand Prix in Las Vegas Champion
- 2002 K-1 World Grand Prix Preliminary USA Champion
- 2001 K-1 World Grand Prix Preliminary USA runner-up
- W.K.C. World Cruiser Weight Champion
- W.K.A. North American Heavyweight Champion
- Canadian Heavyweight Champion

== Kickboxing record (Incomplete) ==
Kickboxing record (Incomplete)
52 wins (20 (T)KOs, 32 decisions), 24 losses, 1 draw
Date	Result	Opponent	Event	Location	Method	Round	Time
2008-09-12	Win	(Slovakia) Roman Kupcak	K-1 Slovakia 2008	Bratislava, Slovakia	Ext.R KO (side kick)	4	1:53
2008-06-25	Loss	(Hong Kong) Alain Ngalani	Planet Battle I	Hong Kong	Decision	3	3:00
2007-04-21	Loss	(England) James McSweeney	Cage Rage 21	London, England, UK	Decision (majority)	3	3:00
2007-03-10	Loss	(Croatia) Petar Majstorovic	K-1 Fighting Network Croatia 2007	Split, Croatia	TKO (doctor stoppage)	5	N/A
2006-12-16	Loss	(Azerbaijan) Zabit Samedov	K-1 Fighting Network Prague Round '07	Prague, Czech Republic	TKO	3	N/A
2006-08-12	Loss	(Germany) Stefan Leko	K-1 World Grand Prix 2006 in Las Vegas II Final	Las Vegas, Nevada, USA	TKO (retirement)	2	2:45
Fails to qualify for K-1 World Grand Prix 2006 in Osaka opening round.
2006-08-12	Win	(United States) Imani Lee	K-1 World Grand Prix 2006 in Las Vegas II semifinals	Las Vegas, Nevada, USA	Decision (unanimous)	3	3:00
2006-08-12	Win	(Israel) Ariel Mastov	K-1 World Grand Prix 2006 in Las Vegas II quarterfinals	Las Vegas, Nevada, USA	Decision (unanimous)	3	3:00
2006-05-20	Loss	(Russia) Magomed Magomedov	K-1 Scandinavia Grand Prix 2006 quarterfinals	Stockholm, Sweden	Decision (unanimous)	3	3:00
2006-04-29	Win	(Croatia) Ante Varnica	Confrontation in the Ring IV	Split, Croatia	Decision (split)	3	3:00
2005-08-13	Loss	(Albania) Azem Maksutaj	K-1 World Grand Prix 2005 in Las Vegas II quarterfinals	Las Vegas, Nevada, USA	Decision (unanimous)	3	3:00
2005-05-21	Win	(Albania) Azem Maksutaj	K-1 Scandinavia Grand Prix 2005 quarterfinals	Stockholm, Sweden	Ext.R decision (majority)	4	3:00
Despite victory would have to withdraw from tournament due to injury.
2004-11-06	Loss	(Japan) Noboru Uchida	Titans 1st	Kitakyushu, Japan	Decision (unanimous)	3	3:00
2004-09-25	Loss	(Netherlands) Peter Aerts	K-1 World Grand Prix 2004 Final Elimination	Tokyo, Japan	Decision (unanimous)	3	3:00
Fails to qualify for K-1 World Grand Prix 2004 Final.
2004-06-06	Win	(Japan) Takeru	K-1 World Grand Prix 2004 in Nagoya	Nagoya, Japan	TKO (referee stoppage)	2	1:15
2004-04-30	Win	(United States) Dewey Cooper	K-1 World Grand Prix 2004 in Las Vegas I Final	Las Vegas, Nevada, USA	Decision (unanimous)	3	3:00
Wins K-1 World Grand Prix 2004 in Las Vegas I and qualifies for K-1 World Grand Prix 2004 Final Elimination.
2004-04-30	Win	(United States) Kelly Leo	K-1 World Grand Prix 2004 in Las Vegas I semifinals	Las Vegas, Nevada, USA	TKO (2 Knockdowns)	1	2:09
2004-04-30	Win	(United States) Marvin Eastman	K-1 World Grand Prix 2004 in Las Vegas I quarterfinals	Las Vegas, Nevada, USA	TKO (2 Knockdowns)	2	1:25
2004-02-14	Draw	(Sweden) Larry Lindwall	K-1 Scandinavia 2004 World Qualification	Stockholm, Sweden	Draw	3	3:00
2003-12-31	Win	(Japan) Hiromi Amada	Inoki Bom-Ba-Ye 2003	Kobe, Japan	KO (left hook)	2	0:46
2003-10-11	Loss	(Switzerland) Bjorn Bregy	K-1 World Grand Prix 2003 Final Elimination Super Fight	Osaka, Japan	TKO (3 Knockdowns)	1	2:50
2003-08-15	Loss	(Netherlands) Remy Bonjasky	K-1 World Grand Prix 2003 in Las Vegas II Final	Las Vegas, Nevada, USA	Ext.R Decision (split)	4	3:00
Fails to qualify for K-1 World Grand Prix 2003 Final Elimination but will be invited to take part in a Super Fight.
2003-08-15	Win	(United States) George Randolph	K-1 World Grand Prix 2003 in Las Vegas II semifinals	Las Vegas, Nevada, USA	KO (left hook)	1	0:55
2003-08-15	Win	(Brazil) Jefferson Silva	K-1 World Grand Prix 2003 in Las Vegas II quarterfinals	Las Vegas, Nevada, USA	TKO (2 Knockdowns)	2	2:22
2003-07-13	Win	(Croatia) Gordan Jukić	K-1 World Grand Prix 2003 in Fukuoka	Fukuoka, Japan	TKO (referee stoppage)	3	3:00
2003-05-02	Loss	(United States) Carter Williams	K-1 World Grand Prix 2003 in Las Vegas quarterfinals	Las Vegas, Nevada, USA	Decision (split)	3	3:00
2002-12-07	Loss	(Sweden) Martin Holm	K-1 World Grand Prix 2002 Reserve Fight	Tokyo, Japan	Decision (majority)	3	3:00
2002-10-05	Loss	(Netherlands) Semmy Schilt	K-1 World Grand Prix 2002 in Las Vegas Final	Saitama, Japan	Decision (unanimous)	3	3:00
Fails to qualify for K-1 World Grand Prix 2002 although will be invited to take part as a reservist.
2002-08-17	Win	(Czech Republic) Pavel Majer	K-1 World Grand Prix 2002 in Las Vegas Final	Las Vegas, Nevada, USA	TKO (referee stoppage)	2	1:01
Wins K-1 World Grand Prix 2002 in Las Vegas and qualifies for K-1 World Grand Prix 2002 Final Elimination.
2002-08-17	Win	(France) Gregory Tony	K-1 World Grand Prix 2002 in Las Vegas semifinals	Las Vegas, Nevada, USA	Decision (unanimous)	3	3:00
2002-08-17	Win	(Spain) Ricardo Duenas	K-1 World Grand Prix 2002 in Las Vegas quarterfinals	Las Vegas, Nevada, USA	KO (body shot)	1	1:25
2002-05-03	Win	(United States) Rick Roufus	K-1 World Grand Prix 2002 Preliminary USA Final	Las Vegas, Nevada, USA	Ext.R TKO (corner stoppage)	4	0:00
Wins K-1 World Grand Prix 2002 Preliminary USA and qualifies for K-1 World Grand Prix 2002 in Las Vegas.
2002-05-03	Win	(United States) Jeff Ford	K-1 World Grand Prix 2002 Preliminary USA semifinals	Las Vegas, Nevada, USA	TKO (Injury)	2	2:00
2002-05-03	Win	(Canada) Giuseppe DeNatale	K-1 World Grand Prix 2002 Preliminary USA quarterfinals	Las Vegas, Nevada, USA	TKO	3	2:00
2001-10-08	Win	(Brazil) Glaube Feitosa	K-1 World Grand Prix 2001 in Fukuoka	Fukuoka, Japan	Decision (unanimous)	3	3:00
2001-06-16	Loss	(England) Matt Skelton	K-1 World Grand Prix 2001 in Melbourne semifinals	Melbourne, Australia	Decision (unanimous)	3	3:00
2001-06-16	Win	(Croatia) Mirko Cro Cop	K-1 World Grand Prix 2001 in Melbourne quarterfinals	Melbourne, Australia	TKO (referee stoppage)	1	1:24
2001-05-05	Loss	(United States) Maurice Smith	K-1 World Grand Prix 2001 Preliminary USA Final	Las Vegas, Nevada, USA	Ext.R Decision (split)	4	3:00
Despite defeat qualifies for K-1 World Grand Prix 2001 in Melbourne.
2001-05-05	Win	(United States) Jeff Roufus	K-1 World Grand Prix 2001 Preliminary USA semifinals	Las Vegas, Nevada, USA	Decision (unanimous)	3	3:00
2001-05-05	Win	(United States) Ronald Belliveau	K-1 World Grand Prix 2001 Preliminary USA quarterfinals	Las Vegas, Nevada, USA	Decision (split)	3	3:00
2001-03-17	Loss	(New Zealand) Ray Sefo	K-1 Gladiators 2001	Yokohama, Japan	KO (right hook)	1	1:56
2000-10-09	Win	(Denmark) Nicholas Pettas	K-1 World Grand Prix 2000 in Fukuoka	Fukuoka, Japan	Decision (unanimous)	5	3:00
2000-08-20	Win	(Australia) Phil Fagan	K-1 World Grand Prix 2000 in Yokohama	Yokohama, Japan	TKO	2	1:05
1999-07-18	Loss	(Bosnia and Herzegovina) Zijad Poljo	K-1 Dream '99 quarterfinals	Nagoya, Japan	Decision (unanimous)	3	3:00
1999-06-05	Win	(England) Michael Thompson	K-1 Fight Night '99	Zürich, Switzerland	Decision (unanimous)	5	3:00
1999-02-03	Loss	(Netherlands) Peter Aerts	K-1 Rising Sun '99	Tokyo, Japan	KO (left knee)	2	2:40
1998-08-28	Win	(South Africa) Carl Bernardo	K-1 Japan Grand Prix '98	Tokyo, Japan	TKO (referee stoppage)	1	0:34
Makes K-1 debut.
1995-08-25	Loss	(New Zealand) Ray Sefo	N/A	Auckland, New Zealand	KO (left knee)	3	N/A
Fight was for ISKA World Light Heavyweight title.
1994-01-22	Loss	(United States) Rick Roufus	N/A	Tahoe, Nevada, USA	KO (left hook & head kick)	1	0:43
Fight was for inaugural IKF Pro Light Heavyweight World title.
1993-06-22	Loss	(Poland) Marek Piotrowski	PKA Karatemania 6	Montreal, Canada	TKO	11	N/A
Fight was for WAKO Pro Light Heavyweight World title.
1989-02-19	Loss	Thorne	N/A	Amsterdam, Netherlands	KO	1	N/A
1988-02-27	Win	(Netherlands) Coswal	Superfights I	Amsterdam, Netherlands	Decision	5	2:00
1988	Loss	(Netherlands) Milton Felter	N/A	Amsterdam, Netherlands	Decision	5	N/A
1986	Win	(Canada) Darryl Weinberger	N/A	Regina, Canada	KO	1	0:30
Makes professional kickboxing debut.
Legend: Win Loss Draw/No contest Notes

== Mixed martial arts record ==
Professional record breakdown
2 matches	1 win	1 loss
By submission	0	1
By decision	1	0

Res.	Record	Opponent	Method	Event	Date	Round	Time	Location	Notes
Win	1–1	Rick Roufus	Decision (unanimous)	Strike FC - Night of Gladiators	April 18, 2008	2	5:00	Ploiesti, Romania	
Loss	0–1	Lyoto Machida	Submission (forearm choke)	K-1 Beast 2004 in Niigata	March 14, 2004	1	2:30	Niigata, Japan	

== Professional boxing record ==
2 Wins (2 Decisions), 1 Loss (1 (T)KO)
Result	Record	Opponent	Type	Round	Date	Location	Notes
Win	2-1	(United States) Kip Triplet	UD	4	17/08/1996	Hoquiam, Washington, United States	
Loss	1-1	(Canada) Cecil Gray	TKO	1	20/02/1992	New Westminster, Canada	
Win	1-0	(Canada) Cecil Gray	UD	4	10/05/1991	Vancouver, Canada	

== See also ==
- List of K-1 events
- List of male kickboxers
