= Ariel Mastov =

Israeli martial artist

- Born: February 4, 1975 (age 51); Uzbek SSR, Soviet Union
- Native name: אריאל מסטוב
- Other names: The Shadow
- Nationality: Israeli
- Height: 1.80 m (5 ft 11 in)
- Weight: 95 kg (209 lb; 15.0 st)
- Division: Heavyweight
- Style: Kobukan karate
- Fighting out of: Los Angeles, California, U.S.
- Team: Legends Gym
- Years active: 1999–present

Kickboxing record
- Total: 13
- Wins: 11
- By knockout: 7
- Losses: 2
- By knockout: 1

Ariel Mastov (Hebrew: אריאל מסטוב; born August 10, 1975) is an Israeli kickboxer and former 8 times WPKA Kobukan Karate champion, currently competing in K-1 fighting circuit.

== Biography and career ==
Ariel Mastov was born in Uzbekistan and grew up in Ashdod, Israel. In 2003 he immigrated to the United States, settling in Los Angeles, California. He is training at Legends Gym in Hollywood.

On August 12, 2006 Mastov made his K-1 debut at K-1 World GP 2006 in Las Vegas II against Michael McDonald as a late substitute for scheduled fighter Jeremy Williams who was not cleared to fight by Nevada State Athletic Commission. Mastov lost the bout via unanimous decision.

On August 11, 2007 Ariel was scheduled to participate on his second K-1 tournament at K-1 World GP 2007 in Las Vegas, but due to last minute pullout by Chalid Arrab he was replaced to fight Petr Vondracek on one of the Superfights, winning the bout by KO (spinning heel kick).

== Titles ==
- 2000-2005 WPKA Japan Karate Heavyweight champion
- 1999-2000 WPKA Israel Karate Heavyweight champion

== Kickboxing record (Incomplete) ==
11 Wins (7 (T)KO's, 4 decisions), 2 Losses (1 (T)KO, 1 decision)
Date	Result	Opponent	Event	Method	Round	Time
2008-09-12	Loss	(France) Freddy Kemayo	K-1 Slovakia 2008, Bratislava, Slovakia	TKO (Doctor stoppage)	1	N/A
08/11/2007	Win	(Czech Republic) Petr Vondracek	K-1 World GP 2007 in Las Vegas	KO (Spinning heel kick)	3	1:52
08/12/2006	Loss	(Canada) Michael McDonald	K-1 World Grand Prix 2006 in Las Vegas II	Decision (Unanimous)	3	3:00
04/27/2003	Win	(Japan) Shinichi Hasegawa	18th WPKA Kobukan Karate championships, Japan	Decision	3	3:00
10/14/2002	Win	(United States) John Dickson	17th WPKA Kobukan Karate championships, Japan	KO (Punches)	1	N/A
10/14/2002	Win	(Japan) Shinichi Hasegawa	17th WPKA Kobukan Karate championships, Japan	Decision	3	3:00
03/31/2002	Win	(United States) Thomas Sims	16th WPKA Kobukan Karate championships, Japan	Decision	3	3:00
03/26/2000	Win	(United States) Thomas Sims	14th WPKA Kobukan Karate championships, Japan	KO (Punches)	3	N/A
03/26/2000	Win	(Ukraine) Roman Monastirsky	14th WPKA Kobukan Karate championships, Japan	Decision	3	3:00

== See also ==
- List of male kickboxers
- List of K-1 Events
