= K-1 World Grand Prix 2004 Final =

K-1 martial arts event in 2004

- Promotion: K-1
- Date: December 4, 2004
- Venue: Tokyo Dome
- City: Tokyo, Japan
- Attendance: 64,819

Event chronology
K-1 Fighting Network Rumble on the Rock 2004	K-1 World Grand Prix 2004 Final	K-1 Challenge 2004 Oceania vs World

K-1 World Grand Prix 2004 Final was a kickboxing event promoted by the K-1 organization. It was the twelfth K-1 World Grand Prix final, involving twelve of the world's best K-1 fighters (four being reservists) from eight countries, with all bouts fought under K-1 Rules (100 kg/156-220 lbs). The tournament qualifiers had almost all qualified via the K-1 World Grand Prix 2004 Final Elimination with the exception of Remy Bonjasky who was the reigning champion.

The tournament winner was Remy Bonjasky who won his second consecutive K-1 World Grand Prix title by defeating Musashi in the final by second extra round unanimous decision in a repeat of the previous years final. The tournament was also notable for the inclusion of Kaoklai Kaennorsing who was the youngest (21 years) and lightest (172 lbs) competitor to ever participate in a K-1 World Grand Prix final. During the course of the competition Kaoklai managed to get to the Semi Finals by defeating the heaviest competitor at this year's finals, Mighty Mo, who weighed in at 280 lbs. The event was held at the Tokyo Dome in Tokyo, Japan on Saturday, December 4, 2004 in front of 64,819 spectators.

== K-1 World Grand Prix 2004 Final Tournament ==
K-1 World Grand Prix 2004 Final Elimination
(Belarus) Alexey Ignashov
(Thailand) Kaoklai Kaennorsing	DEC
(Trinidad and Tobago) Gary Goodridge
(United States) Mighty Mo	KO
(New Zealand) Ray Sefo	DEC
(Japan) Hiromi Amada
(Japan) Musashi	DEC
(France) Cyril Abidi
(Netherlands) Peter Aerts	DEC
(Canada) Michael McDonald
(France) Jérôme Le Banner
(South Africa) Francois Botha	TKO
(Netherlands) Ernesto Hoost	DEC
(Brazil) Glaube Feitosa

Quarter Finals
(Thailand) Kaoklai Kaennorsing	KO
(United States) Mighty Mo
(New Zealand) Ray Sefo
(Japan) Musashi	DEC
(Netherlands) Peter Aerts
(South Africa) Francois Botha	TKO
(Netherlands) Remy Bonjasky	DEC
(Netherlands) Ernesto Hoost

Semi Finals
(Thailand) Kaoklai Kaennorsing
(Japan) Musashi	DEC
(South Africa) Francois Botha
(Netherlands) Remy Bonjasky	DEC

Final
(Japan) Musashi
(Netherlands) Remy Bonjasky	DEC

== Results ==
Reserve Fight 1: K-1 Rules / 3Min. 3R Ext. 2R

Jérôme Le Banner (France) vs Hiromi Amada (Japan)
Le Banner defeated Amada by KO (2 Knockdown, Left Low Kick) at 1:03 of the 2nd Round.

Quarter Finals: K-1 Rules / 3Min. 3R Ext. 1R

Kaoklai Kaennorsing (Thailand) vs Mighty Mo (United States)
Kaennorsing defeated Mo by KO (Right High Kick) at 2:40 of the 1st Round.

Ray Sefo (New Zealand) vs Musashi (Japan)
Musashi defeated Sefo by Extra Round Unanimous Decision 3-0 (9.5-9, 10-9.5, 10-9.5). After 3 rounds the judges had scored it a Decision Draw (28.5-29, 30-30, 29-28.5).

Peter Aerts (Netherlands) vs Francois Botha (South Africa)
Botha defeated Aerts by KO (2 Knockdown, Leg Injury) at 1:13 of the 1st Round.

Remy Bonjasky (Netherlands) vs Ernesto Hoost (Netherlands)
Bonjasky defeated Hoost by Extra Round Unanimous Decision 3-0 (10-9.5, 10-9.5, 10-9.5). After 3 rounds the judges had scored it a Decision Draw (29-29, 30-30, 29-28.5).

Reserve Fight 2: K-1 Rules / 3Min. 3R Ext. 2R

Cyril Abidi (France) vs Gary Goodridge (Trinidad and Tobago)
Goodridge defeated Abidi by KO (2 Knockdown, Right Hook) at 3:00 of the 1st Round.

Semi Finals: K-1 Rules / 3Min. 3R Ext. 1R

Kaoklai Kaennorsing (Thailand) vs Musashi (Japan)
Musashi defeated Kaennorsing by Extra Round Unanimous Decision 3-0 (10-9.5, 10-9.5, 10-9.5). After 3 rounds the judges had scored it a Decision Draw (30-30, 29.5-29.5, 30-29.5).

Francois Botha (South Africa) vs Remy Bonjasky (Netherlands)
Bonjasky defeated Botha by 3rd Round Unanimous Decision 3-0 (27.5-25.5, 28.5-27.5, 28.5-27.5).

Final: K-1 Rules / 3Min. 3R Ext. 2R

Musashi (Japan) vs Remy Bonjasky (Netherlands)
Bonjasky defeated Musashi by 2nd Extra Round Unanimous Decision 3-0 (10-9, 10-9.5, 10-9.5). After 3 rounds the judges scored it a Majority Draw in favour of Bonjasky (28.5-28, 28.5-27.5, 29-29). After the 1st Extra Round the judges scored it Majority Draw in favour of Bonjasky (9.5-9.5, 10-9.5, 9.5-9.5)

== See also ==
- List of K-1 events
- List of K-1 champions
- List of male kickboxers
