= Hongman Choi =

South Korean martial artist (born 1980)

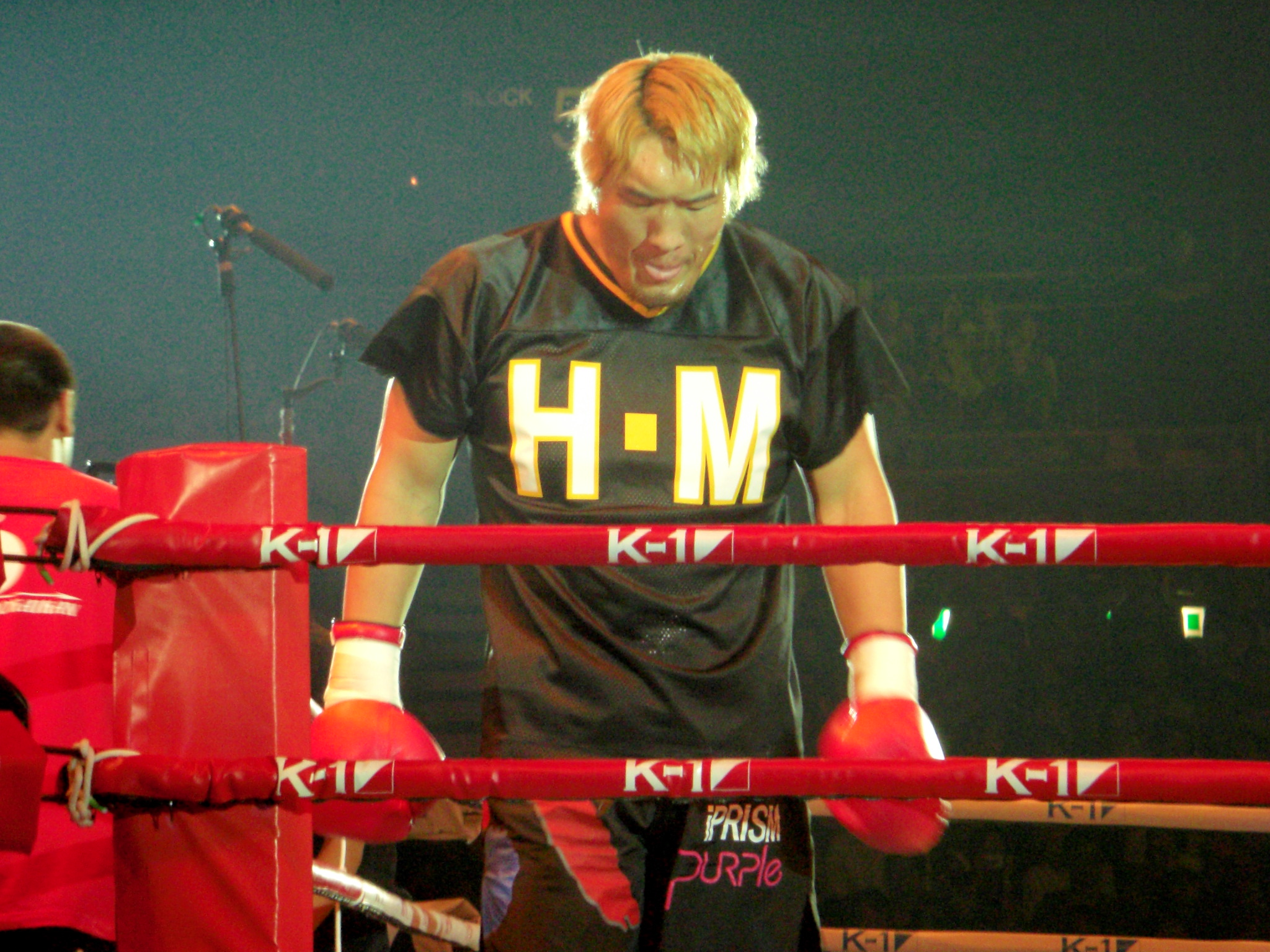
- Born: Choi Hong-man; October 30, 1980 (age 46); Jeju City, South Korea
- Native name: 최홍만
- Other names: The Techno Goliath; Korean Colossus; Che Man
- Height: 2.19 m (7 ft 2 in)
- Weight: 159.5 kg (352 lb; 25 st 2 lb)
- Division: Super Heavyweight
- Reach: 235 cm (93 in)
- Style: MMA; Kickboxing, Ssireum

Kickboxing record
- Total: 22
- Wins: 13
- By knockout: 7
- Losses: 9
- By knockout: 3

Mixed martial arts record
- Total: 9
- Wins: 4
- By knockout: 3
- By submission: 1
- Losses: 5
- By knockout: 3
- By submission: 2

Other information
- Mixed martial arts record from Sherdog

- Hongman Choi
- Hangul: 최홍만
- Hanja: 崔洪萬
- RR: Choe Hongman
- MR: Ch'oe Hongman

Choi Hong-man (Korean: 최홍만; born October 30, 1980), often anglicised to Hongman Choi, is a South Korean kickboxer, mixed martial artist, and former ssireum wrestler. In Asia, he is called "Che Man", "Techno Goliath", "Korean Monster" and "Korean Colossus". He won the 2005 K-1 Seoul Grand Prix beating Kaoklai Kaennorsing in the finals. He stands 2.18 m (7 ft 2 in) and weighs 160 kg (350 lb; 25 st 3 lb).

== Career ==
=== Ssireum (until 2004) ===
At the 2003 Ssireum Championships, he won the title against his long-time rival Kim Young-hyun (often anglicised to Younghyun Kim). A year later, he reached the final again, where he was defeated by Kim. Across all Combat sport styles, there has never been anywhere a fight of such physical proportions between two athletes. Choi weighed 175.5 kg (387 lb; 27 st 9 lb) standing 2.18 m (7 ft 2 in) tall, Kim weighed 167.8 kg (370 lb; 26 st 6 lb) standing 2.17 m (7 ft 1 in) tall. This even surpasses the WBA heavyweight championship between Nikolay Valuev (2.13 m (7 ft 0 in) at 146.2 kg (322 lb; 23 st 0 lb)) and Jameel McCline (1.98 m (6 ft 6 in) at 121.7 kg (268 lb; 19 st 2 lb)), which is considered a record in boxing in terms of physique. Valuev and McCline brought together 267.9 kg (591 lb; 42 st 3 lb) and 4.11 m (13 ft 6 in), Choi and Kim 343.3 kg (757 lb; 54 st 1 lb) and 4.35 m (14 ft 3 in).

=== K-1 (2005–2008) ===
He announced in December 2004 to leave Ssireum for K-1, and stated he has a two dan black belt in Taekwondo. But this could never be verified. Prepared for his kickboxing career by K-1 fighter Nicholas Pettas, he debuted in K-1 fighting at the World GP 2005 event in Seoul in March, 2005, which he won in the final vs. Kaoklai Kaennorsing. In the final elimination he defeated Bob Sapp with a 2–0 decision, eventually losing to Remy Bonjasky in the World Grand Prix Final.

He got his nickname "Techno Goliath" (테크노 골리앗) when he was a ssireum wrestler in South Korea, as after a victory he would dance to techno music. He is referred to on Japanese television and news articles as the 'Korean Monster' (コリアン・モンスター).

He started the season 2006 at the K-1 World GP in Las Vegas with a unanimous decision win over Sylvester Terkay aka "The Predator". His new coach was the former Japanese Korean K-1 fighter Kin Taiei (anglicised to Taiei Kin).

One of Choi's most notable fights was against current K-1 World Champion Semmy Schilt at the World GP 2006 event in Seoul. The fight was unique due to the enormous size and weight of both fighters (Schilt 2.12 m (6 ft 11 in) 128 kg (282 lb; 20 st 2 lb), Choi 2.18 m (7 ft 2 in) 161 kg (355 lb; 25 st 5 lb)). Choi won the fight by 2-0 decision, but it was a disputed win.

On September 30, 2006, Choi fought Jérôme Le Banner in the final eliminations, and lost after three rounds and one extra round on points. After the fight, Le Banner said: "He is dangerous, his knees are already almost at the level of my head, he's not human! But he's a good guy and I like him, he's very tough, maybe the strongest guy in K-1, and he has hard bones -- when I kicked him, it hurt my leg! I'm sure with more experience, in two years no one will be able to knock him out!"

On March 4, 2007, in the World Grand Prix in Yokohama, he was knocked out for the first time in his career. Mighty Mo landed his trademark overhand right to the chin and Choi was not able to stand up again. In this fight he weighed 165.4 kg (365 lb; 26 st 1 lb), was very slow and many say it was his worst performance. Choi himself stated in an interview about six months later: At that time, I was not in shape so that I did not train at all.

On August 5. at the Asia World Grand Prix in Hong Kong, he beat Gary Goodridge by KO at 1:34 in the first round. He weighed 163.5 kg (360 lb; 25 st 10 lb). Notable on this fight was his stance. Since his K-1 debut in 2005, he has fought using an orthodox stance. However, in this fight, he adopted for the first time a southpaw stance. This was a strategy by his coach Kin Taiei (often anglicised to Taiei Kin) for an eventual re-match with Mighty Mo (to block his devastating overhand right better as in orthodox stance).

On September 29 at the K-1 final eliminations in Seoul, fighting southpaw stance again, he redeemed his previous loss and defeated Mighty Mo by decision. The win was disputed because Mo was able to land many hard hands on Choi's head, while the Korean missed most of his shots. However, due to a kick Choi delivered to Mighty Mo's groin in the second round that was inexplicably ruled a knockdown. Mighty Mo was quoted in the post-fight interview: "He (Choi) seemed a little bit stronger because I hit him with some good shots and he didn't fall down so I was surprised, actually harder than the ones I hit him with before. He must have been practicing taking punches."

In the World Grand Prix Final 2007 tournament on December 8, he again lost by decision to Jérôme Le Banner. Choi was announced by Jimmy Lennon Jr. as weighing in at 166.6 kg (367 lb; 26 st 3 lb), the heaviest weight of his K-1 career (2005–2008). In the post-fight Choi said: "He (Jérôme) has been my toughest opponent, who was able to resist my powerful punches and counter with speed, I admire his physical strength and I'm sure with more experience will be able to defeat him."

On September 27 at the K-1 final elimination in Seoul, he came back to K-1 and fought against the current Heavyweight champion Badr Hari. After three rounds of fighting, Choi's corner threw in the towel due to a rib injury. Although Hari was unable to faze Choi with two heavy punches thrown in the first and second rounds, in the third round he began targeting Choi's ribcage with punches and kicks. Notable: In the years 2008 and 2009, Hari fought 14 bouts and only lost 3 of them, one by disqualification against Remy Bonjasky, two by KO against Alistair Overeem and Semmy Schilt. From his 11 wins, he won 8 times by KO in the first round, against Ray Sefo, Glaube Feitosa, Domagoj Ostojic, Frédéric Sinistra, Semmy Schilt, Zabit Samedov, Ruslan Karaev and Alistair Overeem. Only Peter Aerts and Errol Zimmerman survived the first round; Aerts lost by KO in the second round, Zimmerman in the third round.

Choi stated before his bout against Hari: "He is a great fighter, but I will be different from those who fell in the opening round". Choi was the only from Hari's 11 defeated opponents in 2008 and 2009, who was able to take his best punches and kicks to the head, body and legs without going down once. Hari said after the fight, "I tried to knock him out in the first round, but he has a really strong chin."

Since his last fight, Choi has lost much weight. He was announced with a weight of 149 kg (328 lb; 23 st 6 lb).

Choi was picked as a first reserve fighter against Ray Sefo at the 2008 K-1 Championship finals which he lost by unanimous decision.

The English version of the fight from HDNet Fights was commentated by Michael Schiavello and Mike Kogan, Co-Commentator was Kimbo Slice. Slice stated he saw Choi the day before at breakfast, and pointed out how big and huge he is. Slice: "Hongman is a really big guy, he is really tall. Fighting him would be a real challenge to any fighter." In the last 23 seconds of the bout, Sefo landed a very hard overhand right to Choi's jaw, but the Korean took it without any damage. Sefo knocked out many opponents with the same right hand, including Jérôme Le Banner, Gary Goodridge and Ruslan Karaev. Schiavello pointed out how the same punch broke the jaw of Le Banner in four places, and Kogan stated: "To Choi's credit, i don't think the people realize the power in Sefo's punches. That landed flush on his jaw, and Choi just shook it off and kept moving forwards, that's ridiculous."

=== Mixed martial arts career (2006–2009) ===
==== K-1 Dynamite ====
On December 31, Choi fought his first mixed martial arts fight on K-1 Dynamite, facing former TV star Bobby Ologun, whom Choi outweighed by a large margin. Ologun charged and missed a flying kick, after which Choi dragged him to the center of the ring and punched him. As Ologun seemed to refuse to defend, the referee stopped the match in just 16 seconds with a win for the Korean.

Choi was scheduled to face former WWE, IWGP, and NCAA national champion amateur wrestler Brock Lesnar at the combined promotion event K-1 Dynamite!! USA, a pay-per-view event at the Los Angeles Memorial Coliseum, on June 2, 2007. However, reportedly due to a benign tumor on his pituitary gland, Choi was denied his California fighter's license on May 23, 2007, putting Dynamite!! USA's main event in jeopardy only 10 days before its scheduled occurrence. Choi was replaced in the fight by fellow Korean fighter Kim Min-soo.

He was confirmed to fight former Pride heavyweight champion Fedor Emelianenko at Yarennoka on New Year's Eve. Choi opened the fight landing on top of Fedor during a takedown attempt, after which the Russian attempted an armbar from the bottom to no avail. The sequence repeated itself, only the second time Fedor showed the difference in experience and locked the armbar, forcing Choi to tap at 1:54.

Choi fought again in Dynamite!! 2008, being scheduled to fight Mirko Cro Cop. The fight was longer, as Cro Cop, a fellow K-1 specialist, found difficult to strike against the larger Choi. He did land multiple low kicks through the round, which eventually caused enough damage for the fight to be stopped in a KO for Cro Cop.

==== DREAM ====
Choi's next MMA match would be for the Dream promotion. He faced retired baseball player Jose Canseco in an MMA match on May 26, 2009, as part of its Super Hulk Tournament. Choi beat Canseco in 1 minute 17 seconds.

The Korean advanced to the semi-finals at Dream 11 and was pitted against Ikuhisa Minowa, a Japanese fighter familiar with large differences in size. Minowa resorted to creative takedown and guard pulls to bring the match to the mat, but Choi used his size and strength to shut down his gameplan. Eventually Minowa pinned Choi in side control and landed knee strikes, which the Korean answered to by landing some ground and pound later through Minowa's guard. At the next round, however, Minowa took Choi down and immediately locked a heel hook, making Choi submit.

Choi was expected to participate in Dream 14, which was supposed to have taken place in Seoul, South Korea. But many factors, including the issue that many top Korean stars such as Denis Kang and him (Choi) were not available in April, contributed to the event being canceled.

=== Military service and inactivity (2008–2015) ===
In April 2008, Choi joined the Korean army for his 21 months military service. After failing two medical tests, he was relieved from his military duty. The main reason was a problem with the sight in his left eye, which was the result of a brain tumor. On June 9, the tumor was finally removed through surgery.

Choi did not compete in any competitions between October 2009 and July 2015. He frequently appeared in TV shows, game shows, and a few movies during those years. Many critics believe he never reached his best shape after this long break. Even though he was technically very limited and mostly lost to the best K-1 and MMA fighters, his greatest strengths were his very good chin, overall punch and kick resistance, and a very strong Muay Thai knee strike. Fighters like Carlos Toyota or David Mihajlov don't have a similar Knockout-ratio or punching power as Badr Hari, Jérôme Le Banner or Mighty Mo. Only Mo was able to knock him out during Choi's time in K-1 (2005–2008), although the Korean stated he had not trained and was not in shape at that time, and backed up this claim in the rematch by not just appearing in top shape against Mo, but also by taking his best punches. During his best days, Choi was also able to take all punches and kicks from Bob Sapp, Semmy Schilt and Remy Bonjasky without being knocked down or out once. Le Banner had four fights with Mark Hunt, and he took him down a total of three times, once with hard kicks to the legs, once with a kick to the head, and once with a counter punch to the head, and Hunt received an eight count each time. Hunt is considered one of the most durable fighters in K-1 and MMA, with very good chin and general punch and kick resistance. Still he was floored by Le Banner three times, and was also knocked out by a liver kick from Schilt. Schilt knocked out many of his opponents with punches and kicks, and Le Banner had with over 80% the highest knockout ratio in the entire K-1 Circus. Choi took every attack to the head, body, and legs from Le Banner and Schilt, never went to the floor, and was never counted out or received an eight count in his bout with the Dutchman and his two bouts with the Frenchman.

=== Comeback (2015–present) ===
==== Road Fighting Championship ====
In July 2015, after 5 years and 9 months of inactivity in combat sport, he gave his comeback against Brazilian fighter Carlos Toyota, weighing 140 kg (310 lb), the lowest to this day. He lost via knockout in the first round (multiple punches to face and jaw). Toyota was the second fighter besides Mighty Mo who knocked out Choi with head punches.

On December 26, 2015, he competed in the Openweight Tournament "ROAD FC 027" in China. His opponent in the quarterfinals was Chinese Luo Quanchao. Choi was able to win the fight by T.K.O in the first round and advance to the semifinals.

In April 2016, he fought the "Chinese" Aorigele, whom he defeated by knockout in round one. He was weighing 157 kg (346 lb).

On September 24, 2016, Choi, at a new fighting weight of 161.5 kg (356 lb), competed in the finals of the Openweight Tournament. Despite intense preparation against the strong puncher Mighty Mo, who knocked him out with a heavy head punch back in 2007, Choi was not able to avoid another Knockout defeat by a head punch from Mo.

==== Kickboxing ====
On November 6, 2016, Choi returned to a kickboxing ring for the first time since December 2008. At the Silk Road Hero Kickboxing event in China, he lost a unanimous points decision to China's Zhou Zhipeng. Choi weighed 160 kg, while Zhou weighed only 72 kg (159 lb) with a height of 1.78 m (5 ft 10 in)

On November 27, 2017. At the AFC event in South Korea, he defeated Japan's Noboru Uchida by a unanimous points victory.

On November 15, 2018, he fought at the Chinese event MAS FIGHT against Wushu (sport) Fighter Yi Long, who weights 80 kg (180 lb) standing 1.76 m (5 ft 9 in). The fight was scored under strange circumstances as a Technical knockout win for the Chinese. Yi kicked Choi with a spinning kick below the waist at 1.30 minutes into the first round, after which Choi sat down on the floor in pain, and stayed there for several minutes. The referee was Tony Weeks, known from Boxing, who, among other famous fights, refereed the World Heavyweight Championship fight between Wladimir Klitschko and Tyson Fury in Düsseldorf in November 2015, when Fury dethroned the long reigning Champion Klitschko. Choi complained to Weeks, that Yi had kicked him to the groin, but Weeks disagreed and judged Choi's behavior as refusing to fight. Various slow-motion footage and photos show that while Yi's kick was not clearly to the groin, but it was below the beltline.

On June 11, 2019, he lost to David Mihajlov of Hungary, who sent him to the ground with several head shots 49 seconds into the first round, and the referee stopped the fight after a brief count. Choi weighed 150 kg (330 lb), Mihajlov 110 kg (240 lb). Apart from Mighty Mo in 2007 and 2016 and Carlos Toyota in 2015, Mihajlov was the third man to knock Choi out with head shots.

==== Professional wrestling ====
On July 21, 2019 Choi gave a shot at professional wrestling when he worked for Dragon Gate's Kobe Pro Wrestling event. His only match was a victory over Ryo Saito and Stalker Ichikawa in a handicap match.

== Outside the ring ==
In 2008 Choi began a singing career with supermodel Kang Su-hee in Korea under the name of Beauty & The Beast. He also made a rap single featuring vocals by Kang. In 2009, he made his movie debut in the Japanese film Goemon.

He has some tattoos. His surname "Choi" on his left shoulder., on his left forearm the phrase "Secret of success is constancy to purpose", on his chest "No Pain No Gain".

In April 2010, Choi appeared as part of the main cast in Japanese TV drama series Kaibutsu-kun, adapted from Fujiko Fujio's Kaibutsu-kun of the same name. Choi played the character Franken, which was one of the three understudies of prince Kaibutsu-kun.

In April 2012 he appeared as a guest in the 19th episode of the Korean variety show Invincible Youth 2.

He has also done several endorsement works with actress / former model Karina. He has been a face for Lotte's ice cream product Mona Oh ('Monaka-King') alongside Karina. He threw out the ceremonial first pitch along with Karina at the Chiba Lotte Marines-Yomiuri Giants game in Chiba Marine Stadium on June 11, 2006. He has also done endorsement works for videogame LittleBigPlanet with Mari Yaguchi, a former member of the music group Morning Musume.

In March 2012, he made a special guest appearance in episode 2 and another in July 2012 in episode 17 of JTBC variety programme Shinhwa Broadcast hosted by boyband Shinhwa.

On September 8 and 15, 2013, he appeared in episodes 310 and 311 of the variety show 2 Days & 1 Night (KBS2) as a guest of regular cast-member Kim Jong-min.

On December 29, 2013, he appeared in episode 6 of The Return of Superman (KBS), visiting Lee Hwijae.

On November 16, 2014, he appeared in episode 28 of reality show Roommate (SBS) as a guest along with female singer Hong Jin-young.

On June 23, 2015, he appeared in episode 254 of variety show Running Man (SBS) as a guest as well as a hunter for Running Man nametags.

== Championships and accomplishments ==
=== Kickboxing ===
- K-1
  - 2005 K-1 World Grand Prix in Seoul Champion

=== Mixed martial arts ===
- DREAM
  - 2009 DREAM Super Hulk Tournament semifinalist
- Road Fighting Championship
  - 2016 Road FC Openweight Tournament runner-up

=== Ssireum ===
- 41st Cheonhajangsa Ssireum Championship in 2003

== Mixed martial arts record ==
Professional record breakdown
9 matches	4 wins	5 losses
By knockout	4	3
By submission	0	2

Res.	Record	Opponent	Method	Event	Date	Round	Time	Location	Notes
Loss	4–5	Mighty Mo	KO (punch)	Road FC 033	September 24, 2016	1	4:06	Seoul, South Korea	Road FC Openweight Tournament Finals.
Win	4–4	Aorigele	KO (punch)	Road FC 030: In China	April 16, 2016	1	1:36	Beijing, China	Road FC Openweight Tournament Semifinals.
Win	3–4	Quanchao Luo	TKO (corner stoppage)	ROAD FC 027: In China	December 26, 2015	1	3:14	Shanghai, China	Road FC Openweight Tournament Quarterfinals.
Loss	2–4	Carlos Toyota	KO (punch)	ROAD FC 024: In Japan	July 25, 2015	1	1:29	Tokyo, Japan	
Loss	2–3	Ikuhisa Minowa	Submission (heel hook)	Dream 11	October 6, 2009	2	1:27	Yokohama, Japan	Dream Super Hulk Grand Prix Semifinal.
Win	2–2	Jose Canseco	TKO (submission to punches)	Dream 9	May 26, 2009	1	1:17	Yokohama, Japan	Dream Super Hulk Grand Prix Quarterfinal.
Loss	1–2	Mirko Cro Cop	TKO (leg kick)	Fields Dynamite!! 2008	December 31, 2008	1	6:32	Saitama, Japan	
Loss	1–1	Fedor Emelianenko	Submission (armbar)	Yarennoka!	December 31, 2007	1	1:58	Saitama, Japan	
Win	1–0	Bobby Ologun	TKO (punches)	K-1 PREMIUM 2006 Dynamite!!	December 31, 2006	1	0:16	Osaka, Japan	

== Kickboxing record ==
Professional record breakdown
22 matches	13 wins	9 losses
By knockout	7	3
By decision	6	6

Result	Record	Opponent	Method	Event	Date	Round	Time	Location	Notes
Loss	13–9	(Hungary) David Mihajlov	KO	AFC	June 11, 2019	1	0:49	South Korea	
Loss	13–8	(China) Yi Long	TKO	MAS FIGHT	November 15, 2018	1	1:30	China	
Win	13–7	(Japan) Uchida Noboru	Decision (unanimous)	AFC	November 27, 2017	3	3:00	South Korea	
Loss	12–7	(China) Zhou Zhipeng	Decision (unanimous)	Silk Road Hero Kickboxing	November 6, 2016	3	3:00	China	
Loss	12–6	(New Zealand) Ray Sefo	Decision (unanimous)	K-1 World GP Final 2008	December 8, 2008	3	3:00	Yokohama, Japan	
Loss	12–5	(Morocco) Badr Hari	TKO (corner stoppage)	K-1 Seoul GP 2008	September 29, 2008	3	3:00	Seoul, South Korea	K-1 WGP 2008 final eliminations.
Loss	12–4	(France) Jérôme Le Banner	Decision (unanimous)	K-1 World GP Final 2007	December 8, 2007	3	3:00	Yokohama, Japan	K-1 WGP 2007 1/4.
Win	12–3	(American Samoa) Mighty Mo	Decision (majority)	K-1 Seoul GP 2007	September 29, 2007	3	3:00	Seoul, South Korea	K-1 WGP 2007 final elimination.
Win	11–3	(Trinidad and Tobago) Gary Goodridge	KO (knee strike)	K-1 Hong Kong GP 2007	August 5, 2007	1	1:34	Hong Kong	
Win	10–3	(United States) Mike Malone	KO	K-1 World Grand Prix 2007 in Hawaii	April 28, 2007	2	2:02	Hawaii, United States	
Loss	9–3	(American Samoa) Mighty Mo	KO (right overhand)	K-1 Yokohama GP 2007	March 4, 2007	2	0:50	Yokohama, Japan	
Loss	9–2	(France) Jérôme Le Banner	Ext.R decision (unanimous)	K-1 World Grand Prix 2006 in Osaka opening round	September 30, 2006	4	3:00	Osaka, Japan	K-1 WGP 2006 final elimination.
Win	9–1	(Japan) Akebono	KO (left hook)	K-1 World Grand Prix 2006 in Sapporo	July 30, 2006	2	0:57	Sapporo, Japan	
Win	8–1	(Netherlands) Semmy Schilt	Decision (split)	K-1 World Grand Prix 2006 in Seoul	June 3, 2006	3	3:00	Seoul, South Korea	
Win	7–1	(United States) Sylvester Terkay	Decision (unanimous)	K-1 World Grand Prix 2006 in Las Vegas	April 29, 2006	3	3:00	Las Vegas, Nevada, United States	
Loss	6–1	(Netherlands) Remy Bonjasky	Decision (unanimous)	K-1 World Grand Prix 2005	November 19, 2005	3	3:00	Tokyo, Japan	K-1 WGP 2005 1/4.
Win	6–0	(United States) Bob Sapp	Decision (majority)	K-1 World Grand Prix 2005 in Tokyo – final elimination	September 23, 2005	3	3:00	Tokyo, Japan	K-1 WGP 2005 final elimination.
Win	5–0	(Japan) Akebono	TKO (referee stoppage)	K-1 World Grand Prix 2005 in Hawaii	July 29, 2005	1	2:52	Hawaii, United States	
Win	4–0	(United States) Tom Howard	KO (knee strike)	K-1 World Grand Prix 2005 in Hiroshima	June 14, 2005	1	2:11	Hiroshima, Japan	
Win	3–0	(Thailand) Kaoklai Kaennorsing	Ext.R decision (unanimous)	K-1 World Grand Prix 2005 in Seoul	March 19, 2005	4	3:00	Seoul, South Korea	K-1 Seoul GP 2005 Champion.
Win	2–0	(Japan) Akebono	TKO (corner stoppage)	K-1 World Grand Prix 2005 in Seoul	March 19, 2005	1	0:24	Seoul, South Korea	K-1 Seoul GP 2005 1/2.
Win	1–0	(Japan) Wakashoyo	KO (left hook)	K-1 World Grand Prix 2005 in Seoul	March 19, 2005	1	1:40	Seoul, South Korea	K-1 Seoul GP 2005 1/4.

== TV appearances ==
Year	Network	Title	Notes
2013	KBS2	2 Days & 1 Night	Special guest, Ep. 310-311
2013	KBS WORLD TV	The Return of Superman	Guest, Episode 6
2015	SBS	Running Man	Special guest, Ep. 254
2016	tvN	Hey Ghost, Let's Fight	(cameo)
2025	MBC TV	Omniscient Interfering View	Guest, Episode 367-368
