= K-1 World Grand Prix 2008 Final =

K-1 martial arts event in 2008

- The poster for K-1 World Grand Prix 2008 Final
- Promotion: K-1
- Date: December 6, 2008
- Venue: Yokohama Arena
- City: Yokohama, Japan
- Attendance: 17,823

Event chronology
K-1 World Grand Prix 2008 in Riga	K-1 World Grand Prix 2008 Final	K-1 Fighting Network Prague 2008

K-1 World Grand Prix 2008 Final was a martial arts event held by the K-1 on Saturday December 6, 2008 at the Yokohama Arena in Yokohama, Japan. It was the 16th K-1 World GP Final, the culmination of a year full of regional elimination tournaments. All fights followed the classic 8-man tournament format and were conducted under K-1 rules; three rounds of three minutes each, with a possible tiebreaker. The qualification for the top eight fighters in this event was held at K-1 World Grand Prix 2008 in Seoul Final 16.

== Final 8 match ups ==
The drawing of the final 8 match ups took place in the ring right after the final 8 had been determined in Seoul, Korea. A random draw assigned the selection order and the fighters one by one made their way to a stage. First, Ruslan Karaev chose the third fight, next up was Bonjasky who opted for the fourth fight. Zimmerman went to the second bout. Saki, selecting fourth, matched himself up with Karaev. Selecting next, Teixeira decided Zimmerman in the second bout. Aerts eschewed a match-up with Bonjasky, instead of still-empty first bout. LeBanner, with the option of Aerts or Bonjasky, put himself in against the latter. Hari therefore ended up with Aerts.

== K-1 World GP 2008 bracket ==
Final 16
(Netherlands) Semmy Schilt
(Netherlands) Peter Aerts	DEC
(Morocco) Badr Hari	TKO
(South Korea) Hong-man Choi
(Brazil) Glaube Feitosa
(Netherlands) Errol Zimmerman	DEC
(Brazil) Ewerton Teixeira	DEC
(Japan) Musashi
(New Zealand) Ray Sefo
(Turkey) Gökhan Saki	DEC
(Russia) Ruslan Karaev	KO
(Germany) Chalid Arrab
(Netherlands) Remy Bonjasky	DEC
(Australia) Paul Slowinski
(France) Jerome Le Banner	DEC
(Japan) Junichi Sawayashiki

Quarter Finals
(Netherlands) Peter Aerts
(Morocco) Badr Hari	TKO
(Netherlands) Errol Zimmerman	DEC
(Brazil) Ewerton Teixeira
(Turkey) Gökhan Saki	DEC
(Russia) Ruslan Karaev
(Netherlands) Remy Bonjasky	TKO
(France) Jerome Le Banner

Semi Finals
(Morocco) Badr Hari	KO
(Netherlands) Errol Zimmerman
(Turkey) Gökhan Saki
(Netherlands) Remy Bonjasky	KO

Final
(Morocco) Badr Hari	DSQ
(Netherlands) Remy Bonjasky

== Results ==
K-1 World Grand Prix 2008 Final results
Opening fights: K-1 rules / 3Min. 3R
(Japan) Takeru vs Taisei Ko (Japan)
Ko defeated Takeru by 3rd Round Unanimous Decision (30-27, 30-27, 30-27).
(Japan) Mitsugu Noda vs Tsutomu Takahagi (Japan)
Noda defeated Takahagi by KO (3 Knockdown, Right Straight) at 2:49 of the 2nd Round.
Quarter finals: K-1 rules / 3Min. 3R Ext. 1R
(Netherlands) Peter Aerts vs Badr Hari (Morocco)
Hari defeated Aerts by TKO (Referee Stoppage) at 1:39 of the 2nd Round.
(Netherlands) Errol Zimmerman vs Ewerton Teixeira (Brazil)
Zimmerman defeated Teixeira by 3rd Round Majority Decision 2-0 (27-27, 29-27, 28-27).
(Turkey) Gökhan Saki vs Ruslan Karaev (Russia)
Saki defeated Karaev by 3rd Round Unanimous Decision (30-28, 30-27, 29-27).
(Netherlands) Remy Bonjasky vs Jerome Le Banner (France)
Bonjasky defeated Le Banner by TKO (Doctor Stoppage, Arm injury) at 1:46 of the 3rd Round.
Reserve fights: K-1 rules / 3Min. 3R Ext. 1R
(South Korea) Hong-man Choi vs Ray Sefo (New Zealand)
Sefo defeated Choi by 3rd Round Unanimous Decision 3-0 (30-27, 30-28, 30-28).
(Australia) Paul Slowinski vs Melvin Manhoef (Netherlands)
Manhoef defeated Slowinski by KO (2 Knockdown, Left Hook) at 2:26 of the 1st Round.
Semi finals: K-1 rules / 3Min. 3R Ext. 1R
(Morocco) Badr Hari vs Errol Zimmerman (Netherlands)
Hari defeated Zimmerman by KO (Right Straight) at 2:15 of the 3rd Round.
(Turkey) Gökhan Saki vs Remy Bonjasky (Netherlands)
Bonjasky defeated Saki by KO (Right Jumping Mid-Kick) at 0:53 of the 2nd Round.
Final: K-1 rules / 3Min. 3R Ext. 2R
(Morocco) Badr Hari vs Remy Bonjasky (Netherlands)
Bonjasky defeated Hari by DQ (Unsportsmanlike Conduct) at 0:53 of the 2nd Round. Hari was issued a red card and Bonjasky was declared the K-1 World GP 2008 champion.

== See also ==
- List of K-1 events
- K-1 World Grand Prix
- List of K-1 champions
- List of male kickboxers
