= K-1 World Grand Prix 2003 final elimination =

K-1 martial arts event in 2003

K-1 World Grand Prix 2003 Final Elimination
- Promotion: K-1
- Date: October 11, 2003
- Venue: Osaka Dome
- City: Osaka, Japan
- Attendance: 31,700

Event chronology
K-1 Survival 2003 Japan Grand Prix Final	K-1 World Grand Prix 2003; Final Elimination	K-1 Final Fight Stars War in Zagreb

K-1 World Grand Prix 2003 Final Elimination was a kickboxing event promoted by the K-1 organization. The event was held at the Osaka Dome in Osaka, Japan on Saturday, October 11, 2003 in front of 31,700 spectators. It was the final elimination competition for the K-1 World Grand Prix 2003, involving fourteen fighters from across the world, with all bouts being fought under K-1 Rules (100 kg/156-220 lbs). The fourteen fighters were a mixture of invitees or had qualified via previous events (for more information on this see the bulleted list below).

As well as elimination fights there was also a 'Super Fight' between Bjorn Bregy and Michael McDonald fought under K-1 Rules. In total there were sixteen fighters at the event, representing eleven countries.

The seven elimination fight winners would qualify for the K-1 World Grand Prix 2003 final where they would join K-1 Survival 2003 Japan Grand Prix Final winner Musashi. Super fight winner Bjorn Bregy and losing elimination fighter Carter Williams would also be invited as reservists.

Qualifiers

- Cyril Abidi - K-1 World Grand Prix 2003 in Paris runner up
- Peter Aerts - Invitee (at last years tournament)
- Mike Bernardo - Invitee
- Remy Bonjasky - K-1 World Grand Prix 2003 in Las Vegas II winner
- Francois Botha - Invitee
- Francisco Filho - Invitee
- Sam Greco - Invitee
- Peter Graham - K-1 World Grand Prix 2003 in Melbourne winner
- Alexey Ignashov - K-1 World Grand Prix 2003 in Paris winner
- Stefan Leko - Invitee (at last years tournament)
- Bob Sapp - Invitee (at last years tournament)
- Ray Sefo - Invitee (at last years tournament)
- Jerrel Venetiaan - K-1 World Grand Prix 2003 in Basel winner
- Carter Williams - K-1 World Grand Prix 2003 in Las Vegas winner

== Results ==
Super Fight: K-1 Rules / 3Min. 3R Ext.2R

Bjorn Bregy (Switzerland) vs Michael McDonald (Canada)
Bregy defeated McDonald by KO (Knee Strike, 3 Knockdowns) at 2:50 of the 1st Round

Elimination Fights: K-1 Rules / 3Min. 3R Ext.2R

Ray Sefo (New Zealand) vs Carter Williams (United States)
Sefo defeated Williams by 2nd Round Decision 2-0 (20-19, 20-19, 19-19) after being unable to continue due to injury

Peter Graham (Australia) vs Sam Greco (Australia)
Graham defeated Greco by TKO (Corner Stoppage) at 0:30 of the 2nd Round

Mike Bernardo (South Africa) vs Alexey Ignashov (Belarus)
Ignashov defeated Bernardo by KO (Right Punch & Right Low Kick) at 2:21 of the 2nd Round

Peter Aerts (Netherlands) vs Jerrel Venetiaan (Netherlands)
Aerts defeated Venetiaan by 3rd Round Unanimous Decision 3-0 (30-29, 30-29, 30-28)

Francisco Filho (Brazil) vs Stefan Leko (Germany)
Leko defeated Filho by 3rd Round Unanimous Decision 3-0 (30-28, 30-29, 29-28)

Cyril Abidi (France) vs Francois Botha (South Africa)
Abidi defeated Botha by disqualification at 0:19 of the 1st Round

Remy Bonjasky (Netherlands) vs Bob Sapp (United States)
Bonjasky defeated Sapp by disqualification at 1:20 of the 2nd Round

== See also ==
- List of K-1 events
- List of male kickboxers
