= Yokohama Arena =

Indoor arena in Japan

- Yokoari

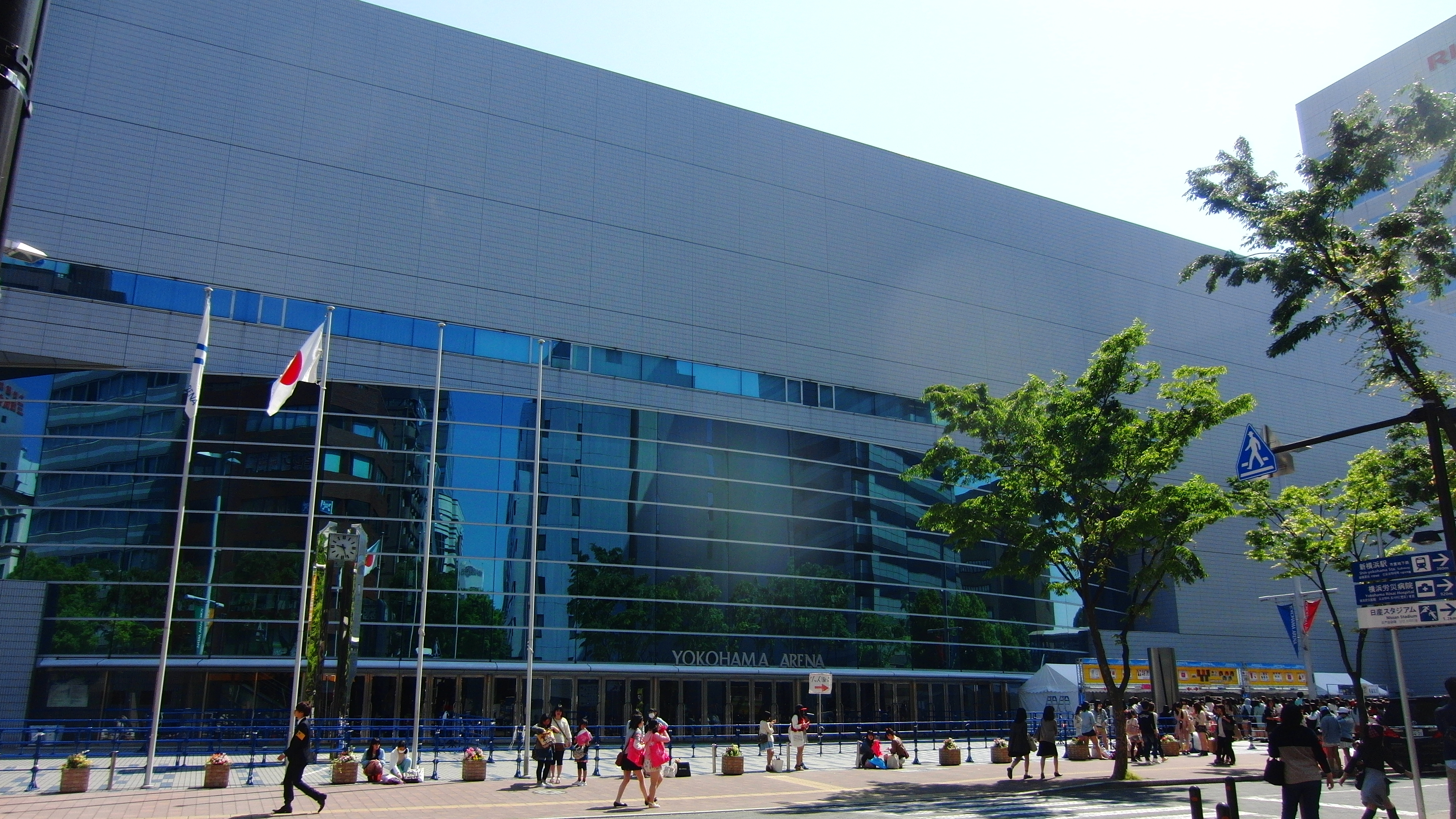
- Main entrance
- Interactive map of Yokohama Arena
- Location: 3-10 Shin-Yokohama, Kōhoku-ku, Yokohama, Kanagawa, Japan
- Coordinates: 35°30′44.60″N 139°37′12.20″E
- Owner: Yokohama Arena Corp.
- Capacity: 17,000; Basketball: 13,083

Construction
- Opened: April 1, 1989
- Renovated: July 1, 2016
- Architect: Takenaka Corporation

Yokohama Arena (横浜アリーナ, Yokohama Arīna) is an indoor arena located in Yokohama, Kanagawa Prefecture, Japan. The arena has a capacity of 17,000 and was opened in 1989. The arena was modeled after US sports venue Madison Square Garden in New York City. It is a five-minute walk from the closest station, Shin-Yokohama Station on the JR/Yokohama Municipal Subway.

As one of the largest concert venues in the Kantō region, it is a frequent location for artists to end their tours. The spacious stage allows for more complex set design and lighting, but the reasonable size makes it easier to sell out than the Tokyo Dome.

== Features ==
The arena uses the computer-controlled Lambda system.

== History ==
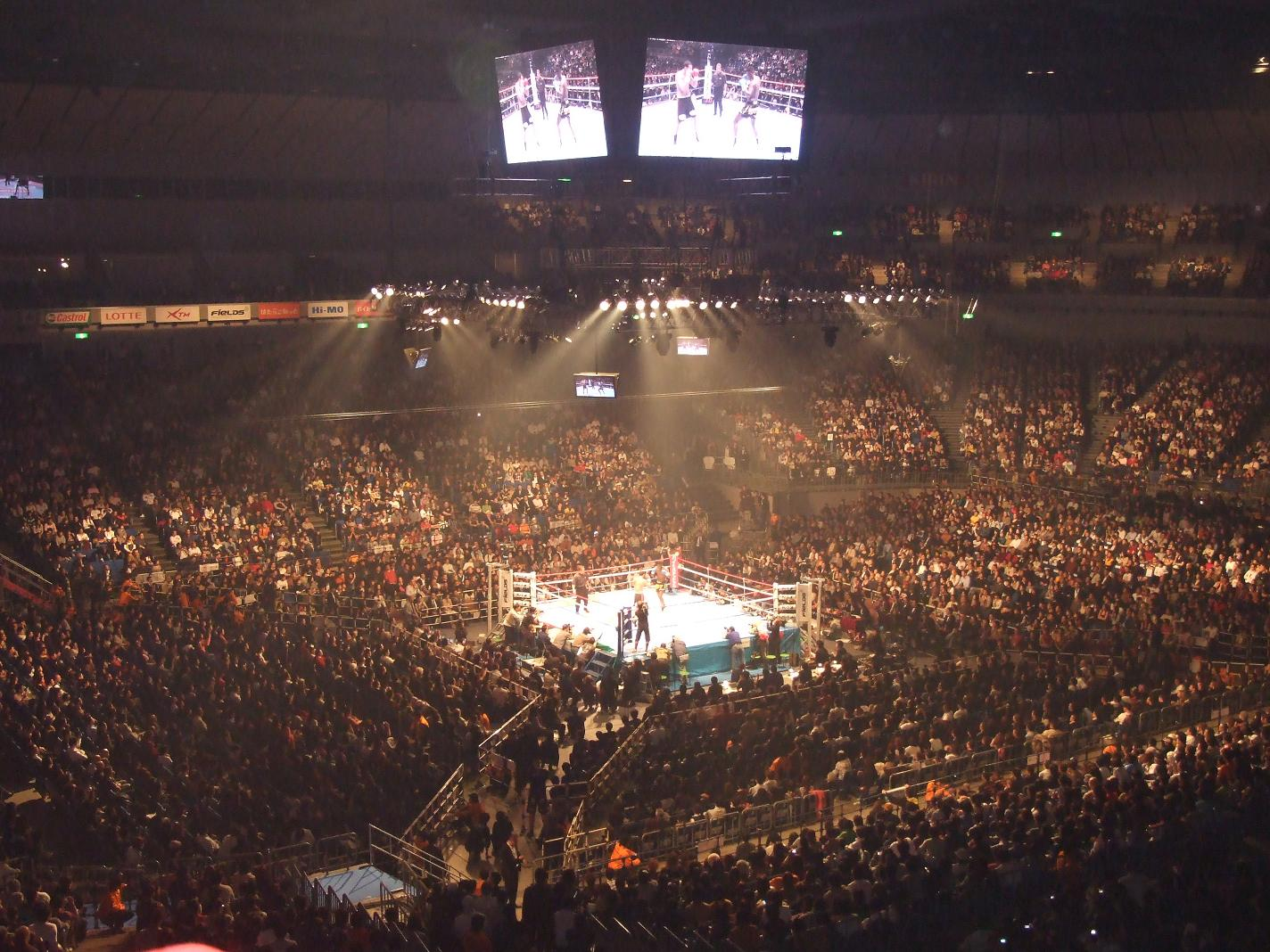
K-1 World Grand Prix 2008 Final in Yokohama Arena.

The Yokohama Arena was opened on April 1, 1989. The opening celebration concert on that day was performed by renowned Japanese singer-songwriter Yumi Matsutoya, and the three upcoming days were additional dates of her concert tour. Many notable Japanese music acts performed at the arena, alphabetically: AKB48, Alexandros, Namie Amuro, Angerme, Aqours, B'z, Babymetal, Band-Maid, Buck-Tick, Coldrain (who would release their live album 15x(5+U) Live at Yokohama Arena) °C-ute, Gackt, Dir En Grey, The Gazette, Gen Hoshino, Glay, Ayumi Hamasaki, hide, Hinatazaka46, Hi-Standard (who would release their live album Live at Yokohama Arena 20181222) Ikimono-gakari, Koshi Inaba, L'Arc-en-Ciel, LiSA, Luna Sea, Misia, Nana Mizuki, NICO Touches the Walls, Momoiro Clover Z, Chisato Moritaka, Morning Musume, Mr. Children, Nogizaka46, One Ok Rock, Ai Otsuka, Yutaka Ozaki, Scandal, Silent Siren, Southern All Stars, Hikaru Utada, X Japan and humanoid projection Hatsune Miku. International artists also performed there, like Guns N' Roses, Pantera (final show ever) JKT48, Mariah Carey, Paula Abdul, Whitney Houston, Bobby Brown, Steve Winwood, Frank Sinatra, Super Junior, Girls' Generation, Shinee, Big Bang, Beast/Highlight Kara, 2NE1, BLACKPINK, TVXQ, F.T. Island, CNBlue, Junho (2PM), f(x), BTS, iKon, Seventeen, Exo-CBX, Twice, Red Velvet, IU and Onew. The venue also held the annual Nano-Mugen Festival from 2005 until 2014, a rock festival organized by Asian Kung-Fu Generation. (Note: Search by year in the past events page.)

The arena sometimes has an occupancy rate of over 90%.

The arena has undergone two renovations: the first one in 2016 and the second one in 2022.

=== MMA ===
The Yokohama Arena has hosted martial arts competitions, including numerous Pride Fighting Championships events, and the K-1 World Grand Prix Final in 2008.

=== Boxing ===
On October 7, 2018, Yokohama arena hosted World Boxing Super Series quarter finals between Naoya Inoue and Juan Carlos Payano.

=== 2011 Tōhoku earthquake/tsunami relief ===
After the 2011 Tōhoku earthquake and resulting tsunami, Yokohama played host as an emergency shelter for those affected by the earthquake and tsunami. Citizens were allowed the stay the night, and were offered blankets and other amenities. Hideharu Terada, a Yokohama Arena official stated "There has never been a big earthquake like this. [...] People are trickling in. They are all calm."

== Accidents and Incidents ==
- Jan 2007 - During a concert of Hello! Project, a spectator in the front row of the third floor stands fell into the arena area on the second floor. Since this incident, spectators in the front row of the third floor are asked to remain seated while watching to prevent further danger.
- Aug 2008 - During a concert of SUPER EIGHT, a piece of plasterboard fell from the ceiling into the seating area, hitting a mother and her daughter on the head in the audience.
- Jan 2015 - After the countdown live of Southern All Stars, a worker fell into the storage space for retractable seating during dismantling operations and sustained serious injuries.
- 8th Jan 2018 - "Hare no hi", a kimono sales and rental company based in Yokohama, suddenly stopped operations on the day of the Coming-of-Age Ceremony. At dressing venues near Yokohama Arena, many young adults found their reservations voided, and they were forced to find alternative providers. A contingency measure was implemented by the City of Yokohama so that those who missed the morning session are accepted in the afternoon session.

== In popular culture ==
- Yokohama Arena is one of the venues featured in the manga and anime series Hajime no Ippo.
- Since her debut, Hololive's first talent, Tokino Sora, has had the dream of holding a live solo concert at Yokohama Arena.

== See also ==
- List of indoor arenas in Japan

== Notes ==
Events and tenants
Preceded by Casino Magic Bay St. Louis	Ultimate Fighting Championship venue UFC Japan: Ultimate Japan	Succeeded by Pontchartrain Center
