= K-1 World Grand Prix =

Annual martial arts tournament from 1993

K-1 World Grand Prix, also known as the K-1 WORLD GP, is an elimination kickboxing tournament that was originally held annually from 1993 by the K-1 organization, under the ownership of the Fighting and Entertainment Group (FEG). Each year, K-1 would hold various 16-men, 8-match grand prix style qualifying tournaments throughout the world to determine which 16 fighters will compete in the main World GP.

== Match-ups ==
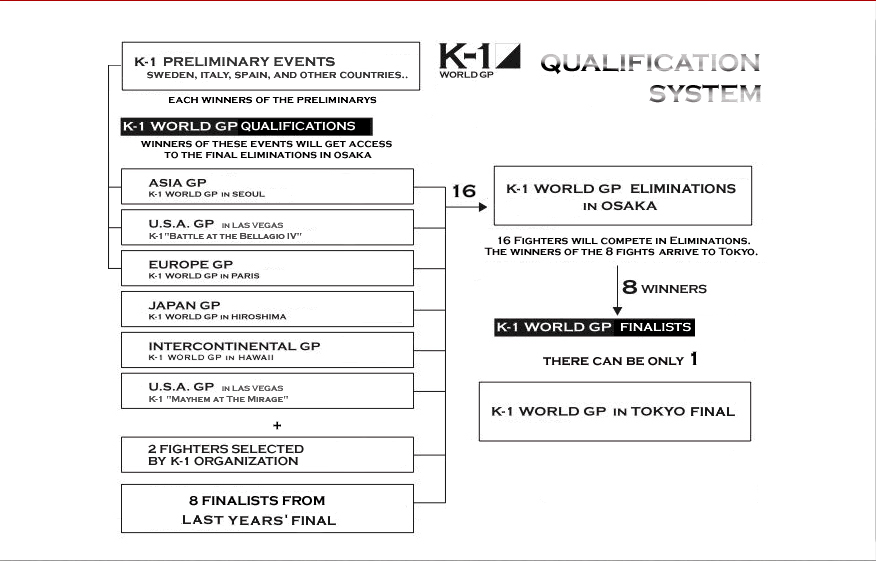
K-1 qualification system until 2005

Combatants of the quarter-finals of a 16-man 8-match tournament were paired by drawing, with the exception of the final. A lottery draw would take place. The balls represented numbers 1 to 8, which determined the fighters' order in choosing a position (from A to H), and the line-number of the match. The next fighter was able to choose between challenging the one on the stage or an "empty" section. This procedure went on until one fighter had to fill its slot left next to the lone rival.

== K-1 World Grand Prix dates and venues ==
・Openweight (Unlimited)

Event	Date of opening round	Date of final round	Country
K-1 World Grand Prix 1993	N/A	April 3, 1993	Japan
K-1 World Grand Prix 1994	N/A	April 30, 1994	Japan
K-1 World Grand Prix 1995	March 3, 1995	May 4, 1995	Japan
K-1 World Grand Prix 1996	March 10, 1996	May 6, 1996	Japan
K-1 World Grand Prix 1997	September 7, 1997	November 9, 1997	Japan
K-1 World Grand Prix 1998	September 27, 1998	December 13, 1998	Japan
K-1 World Grand Prix 1999	October 5, 1999	December 5, 1999	Japan
K-1 World Grand Prix 2000	N/A	December 10, 2000	Japan
K-1 World Grand Prix 2001	N/A	December 8, 2001	Japan
K-1 World Grand Prix 2002	October 5, 2002	December 7, 2002	Japan
K-1 World Grand Prix 2003	October 11, 2003	December 6, 2003	Japan
K-1 World Grand Prix 2004	September 25, 2004	December 4, 2004	Japan
K-1 World Grand Prix 2005	September 23, 2005	November 19, 2005	Japan
K-1 World Grand Prix 2006	September 30, 2006	November 25, 2006	Japan
K-1 World Grand Prix 2007	September 29, 2007	December 8, 2007	Korea, Japan
K-1 World Grand Prix 2008	September 27, 2008	December 6, 2008	Korea, Japan
K-1 World Grand Prix 2009	September 26, 2009	December 5, 2009	Korea, Japan
K-1 World Grand Prix 2010	October 2, 2010	December 11, 2010	Japan
K-1 World Grand Prix 2024	N/A	December 14, 2024	Japan

・Cruiserweight (-90kg)

Event	Date of opening round	Date of final round	Country
K-1 World Grand Prix 2026 -90kg	N/A	February 8, 2026	Japan
K-1 World Grand Prix 2027 -90kg	February 11, 2027	May 9, 2027	Japan

== Champions ==
・Openweight (Unlimited)

Year	Winner	Runner-up	3rd place
1993	(Croatia) Branko Cikatić	(Netherlands) Ernesto Hoost	(Japan) Masaaki Satake (United States) Maurice Smith
1994	(Netherlands) Peter Aerts	(Japan) Masaaki Satake	(Croatia) Branko Cikatić (United States) Patrick Smith
1995	(Netherlands) Peter Aerts	(France) Jerome Le Banner	(South Africa) Mike Bernardo (Netherlands) Ernesto Hoost
1996	(Switzerland) Andy Hug	(South Africa) Mike Bernardo	(Japan) Musashi (Netherlands) Ernesto Hoost
1997	(Netherlands) Ernesto Hoost	(Switzerland) Andy Hug	(Netherlands) Peter Aerts (Brazil) Francisco Filho
1998	(Netherlands) Peter Aerts	(Switzerland) Andy Hug	(South Africa) Mike Bernardo (Australia) Sam Greco
1999	(Netherlands) Ernesto Hoost	(Croatia) Mirko Filipović	(France) Jerome Le Banner (Australia) Sam Greco
2000	(Netherlands) Ernesto Hoost	(New Zealand) Ray Sefo	(Brazil) Francisco Filho (France) Cyril Abidi
2001	(New Zealand) Mark Hunt	(Brazil) Francisco Filho	(Germany) Stefan Leko (Belarus) Alexey Ignashov
2002	(Netherlands) Ernesto Hoost	(France) Jerome Le Banner	(New Zealand) Mark Hunt (New Zealand) Ray Sefo
2003	(Netherlands) Remy Bonjasky	(Japan) Musashi	(Netherlands) Peter Aerts (France) Cyril Abidi
2004	(Netherlands) Remy Bonjasky	(Japan) Musashi	(Thailand) Kaoklai Kaennorsing (South Africa) Francois Botha
2005	(Netherlands) Semmy Schilt	(Brazil) Glaube Feitosa	(Netherlands) Remy Bonjasky (Japan) Musashi
2006	(Netherlands) Semmy Schilt	(Netherlands) Peter Aerts	(Brazil) Glaube Feitosa (Netherlands) Ernesto Hoost
2007	(Netherlands) Semmy Schilt	(Netherlands) Peter Aerts	(France) Jerome Le Banner (Netherlands) Remy Bonjasky
2008	(Netherlands) Remy Bonjasky	(Morocco) Badr Hari	(Turkey) Gökhan Saki (Netherlands) Errol Zimmerman
2009	(Netherlands) Semmy Schilt	(Morocco) Badr Hari	(Netherlands) Alistair Overeem (Netherlands) Remy Bonjasky
2010	(Netherlands) Alistair Overeem	(Netherlands) Peter Aerts	(Netherlands) Semmy Schilt (Turkey) Gökhan Saki
2024	(Brazil) Ariel Machado	(China) Feng Rui	(Netherlands) Errol Zimmerman (Japan) Shota Yamaguchi

・Cruiserweight (-90kg)

Year	Winner	Runner-up	3rd place
2026	(Germany) Lukas Achterberg	(Russia) Nikita Kozlov	(Romania) Bogdan Stoica (Morocco) Ibrahim El Bouni
2027			

== See also ==
- List of K-1 events
- List of PRIDE events
- List of male kickboxers
