= Sam Greco =

Australian karateka, kickboxer and mixed martial artist

- Born: Salvatore Greco; 3 May 1967 (age 59); Melbourne, Victoria, Australia
- Other names: Slam 'em Sam The Man
- Height: 1.88 m (6 ft 2 in)
- Weight: 103 kg (227 lb; 16.2 st)
- Division: Heavyweight
- Style: Karate Kickboxing
- Team: Team Greco
- Rank: 6th Dan Black Belt in Kyokushin Karate
- Years active: 1988–2005

Kickboxing record
- Total: 32
- Wins: 19
- By knockout: 11
- Losses: 9
- By knockout: 7
- Draws: 2
- No contests: 2

Mixed martial arts record
- Total: 5
- Wins: 3
- By knockout: 2
- By submission: 1
- Losses: 1
- By decision: 1
- Draws: 1

Other information
- Occupation: Restaurant owner; trainer; actor
- Website: samgreco.com.au
- Mixed martial arts record from Sherdog
- Last updated on: 22 January 2010

Salvatore "Sam" Greco (born 3 May 1967) is an Australian retired full contact karateka, heavyweight K-1 kickboxer, and mixed martial artist. He was the 1994 Karate World Cup champion and holds notable kickboxing victories over Branko Cikatic, Ernesto Hoost, Mike Bernardo, Stefan Leko, and Ray Sefo, as well as MMA victories over Heath Herring and Shungo Oyama.

== Biography and career ==
Salvatore Greco was born on 3 May 1967, in Melbourne, Victoria, Australia and grew up in the suburb of Brunswick. In 2015, Greco stated that he considered the part of Brunswick that he grew up in was 'rough' at the time, and ultimately contributed to his fitness and mental development from a young age. His Italian-born father of greek origins, Vittorio, encouraged him to get involved with soccer from an early age and joined the local Italian backed club, Juventus.

=== Soccer ===
Sam Greco
Personal information
- Full name: Salvatore Greco
- Date of birth: 5 March 1967 (age 59)
- Place of birth: Melbourne, Australia
- Height: 1.88 m (6 ft 2 in)
- Position: Midfielder

Youth career
- 1975–1983: Brunswick United Juventus

Senior career*
Years	Team	Apps	(Gls)
1984	Brunswick United Juventus	1	(0)
- * Club domestic league appearances and goals as of 23 February 2020 ‡ National team caps and goals as of 23 February 2020

Greco joined Juventus (later Brunswick United Juventus) at the age of six, playing as a junior for nine years where in 1983 he would win the club's best-and-fairest for their under-sixteen squad. Prior to the 1984 National Soccer League season, Greco signed a one-year semi-professional contract with the senior squad, who had just been promoted from the Victorian State Premier League to the former national league, making him the club's youngest player to sign for the senior squad.

Greco made his national debut in the fifth round of the season on 1 April 1984, two days before his seventeenth birthday. Greco started and played the whole home match against Footscray JUST at Gillon oval that finished in a 0–2 loss. At the conclusion of the season and after ten years playing for his local club, Greco decided to focus solely on karate and discontinued his soccer career at the age of seventeen.

=== Karate ===
Greco started training in Kyokushin karate at the age of 11 and commenced tournament fighting at the age of 18 establishing himself as one of Australia's best Kyokushin fighters in the late 1980s and early 1990s winning the heavyweight division of the Australian championships five times in 1988, 1989, 1990, 1991 and 1992. In 1988, he fought in the heavyweight division of the 1st Commonwealth Karate Championships held in Sydney placing 3rd with English champion Michael Thompson winning. In 1991, he competed in the 5th World Open Tournament in Japan losing to Michael Thompson in the first round on decision due to accidentally punching him in the face. In 1992, he competed in the heavyweight division of the Oyama Cup Singapore International Open in Singapore placing 3rd with Papua New Guinean Walter Schnaubelt winning.

After the Singapore tournament in October 1992, Sam left Kyokushin fighting as an amateur to join Seidokaikan karate to become a professional karate fighter. Fellow Kyokushin champion Andy Hug had recently joined Seidokaikan and won the 2nd Karate World Cup in October and then in 1993 Michael Thompson also joined Seidokaikan. In June 1993, Sam had his first karate fight at the K-1 Sanctuary III a kickboxing tournament promoted by Seidokaikan karate founder Kazuyoshi Ishii. Sam fought Keisuke Nakagawa who had placed 6th in the 2nd Karate World Cup. In October 1993, Sam competed in the 3rd Karate World Cup defeating Minoru Fujita to make the quarter finals to fight Toshiyuki Atokawa with the judges decision a draw after the first round, and again in the second round, with the fight awarded to Toshiyuki Atokawa on weight difference, who went on to place 3rd. In October 1994, Sam competed in the 4th Karate World Cup making the final after winning four fights. In the final he fought Michael Thompson winning in the first round with a left low kick followed by a straight right body shot to become the Karate World Cup Champion.

=== K-1 ===
Sam had his K-1 debut in 1995 at K-1 Hercules. Following year he appeared in his first K-1 World Grand Prix tournament where he suffered his first loss in semifinals against Musashi.

After retiring in 2005 from professional competition, Sam Greco worked as trainer for other fighters, including Bob Sapp.

=== Professional wrestling ===
Greco was originally signed to professional wrestling company World Championship Wrestling, but never wrestled for them, as it folded before he could debut beyond a backstage vignette. He made his pro wrestling debut in December 2000, when he was working in WCW's developmental territory NWA Wildside. In November 2002, he was signed up by Wrestle-1, then a co-promotion between K-1 and All Japan Pro Wrestling. In the first Wrestle-1 event, Greco teamed up with masked lucha libre exponent Dos Caras Jr. against Kaz Hayashi and Taiyo Kea, all while wearing his own mask and playing a Dos Caras body double named "Sam Grecaras". They won, with Greco receiving good reviews in the process.

He wrestled again in December 2003, appearing in AJPW to team up with Keiji Mutoh and Abdullah the Butcher against Taka Michinoku, Jamal and D'Lo Brown from the villainous faction RO&D. His third and last venture in professional wrestling would be two years later, as part of the briefly revived Wrestle-1 concept. This time he formed a team with fellow K-1 fighter Jan Nortje against Giant Bernard and The Predator, who defeated them when Bernard pinned Nortje.

=== Acting career ===
In 1995 Greco had a small part as an enforcer in the Richard Norton movie Under the Gun, also known as Iron Fist, which was filmed in Victoria. He played the stunt double for retired professional wrestler Stone Cold Steve Austin in the 2007 action thriller The Condemned and also had a small part in the 2008 Australian boxing drama film, Two Fists One Heart which was shot in Western Australia. He has also appeared occasionally in movies as a fight consultant and martial arts advisor.

He had a small part in the fourth episode of the Australian mini-series Underbelly, playing nightclub bouncer Bruno Bolotzi. The episode was first broadcast in February 2008.

He had a small part in an episode of the Australian comedy Pizza, playing the Roman soldier Glutious Maximus. He made another appearance for Pizza this time in a two-part episode Holiday Pizza, playing Pauly's Italian cousin Luigi. The last appearance he made in Pizza was in the Cracker Pizza episode, playing Crackerus in the last season of the series. He also had a part in the Australian comedy Swift and Shift Couriers as Louie "Luigi" Marietti. Both Pizza and Swift and Shift Couriers were created by Greco's good friend Paul Fenech.

He played the Masked Wrestler Zarkos in Scooby-Doo. In the movie Zarkos appears as one of N'Goo Tuana's henchmen, but later he sneaks up on Daphne and captures her and steals the Daemon Ritus from her. Later in the movie he tries to sneak up on Daphne and capture her again but instead they end up fighting; near the end of the fight, he grabs Daphne and throws her onto his back and puts her in a hold but she escapes and defeats him.

== Personal life ==
On 23 March 2018, Greco suffered a heart attack prior to and during his fighter Jimmy Crute competing in the Hex Fight Series and had triple bypass surgery.

== Titles and accomplishments ==
- 1999 K-1 World Grand Prix 3rd Place
- 1999 W.A.K.O. Pro World Muay Thai Super Heavyweight Champion
- 1995 The Best of the Best Tournament Champion
- 1994 W.K.A. World Muay Thai Super Heavyweight Heavyweight Champion
- 1994 Seidokaikan Karate World Cup Champion
- 5-time Australian Kyokushin Karate Heavyweight Champion

== Kickboxing record ==
Kickboxing record
19 wins (11 (T)KOs, 8 decisions), 9 losses, 2 draws
Date	Result	Opponent	Event	Location	Method	Round	Time
2003-10-11	Loss	(Australia) Peter Graham	K-1 World Grand Prix 2003 Final Elimination	Osaka, Japan	TKO (leg injury)	2	0:30
Fails to qualify for K-1 Grand Prix '03 final.
2000-04-23	Loss	(Netherlands) Ernesto Hoost	K-1 The Millennium	Osaka, Japan	TKO (corner stoppage)	3	3:00
1999-12-05	Loss	(Croatia) Mirko Cro Cop	K-1 Grand Prix '99 final round semi-finals	Tokyo, Japan	TKO (left low kick/two knockdowns)	2	2:50
1999-12-05	Win	(New Zealand) Ray Sefo	K-1 Grand Prix '99 final round quarter-finals	Tokyo, Japan	Decision (unanimous)	3	3:00
1999-10-05	Win	(Germany) Stefan Leko	K-1 World Grand Prix '99 opening round	Osaka, Japan	Decision (majority)	3	2:35
Qualifies for K-1 Grand Prix '99 final.
1999-07-18	Loss	(Netherlands) Peter Aerts	K-1 Dream '99	Nagoya, Japan	KO (right high kick)	2	1:38
1999-06-20	Win	(South Africa) Mike Bernardo	K-1 Braves '99	Fukuoka, Japan	Decision (unanimous)	5	3:00
Wins vacant W.A.K.O. Pro World Muay Thai Super Heavyweight Title.
1999-03-22	NC	(Morocco) Samir Benazzouz	K-1 The Challenge '99	Tokyo, Japan	No contest (Greco right leg injury)	2	3:00
1998-12-13	Loss	(Switzerland) Andy Hug	K-1 Grand Prix '98 Final Round semi-finals	Tokyo, Japan	Decision (majority)	3	3:00
1998-12-13	Win	(Netherlands) Ernesto Hoost	K-1 Grand Prix '98 Final Round quarter-finals	Tokyo, Japan	TKO (corner stoppage/cut)	2	3:00
1998-09-27	Win	(England) Matt Skelton	K-1 World Grand Prix '98 opening round	Osaka, Japan	Decision (unanimous)	5	3:00
Qualifies for K-1 Grand Prix '98 final.
1998-05-24	Win	(South Africa) Carl Bernardo	Crash at the Crown	Melbourne, Australia	TKO	5	
1998-07-18	Loss	(France) Jérôme Le Banner	K-1 Dream '98	Nagoya, Japan	KO (punch)	2	2:07
1997-11-09	Loss	(Brazil) Francisco Filho	K-1 Grand Prix '97 Final quarter final	Tokyo, Japan	KO (right hook)	1	0:15
1997-09-07	Win	(United States) Jean-Claude Leuyer	K-1 Grand Prix '97 1st round	Osaka, Japan	KO (right hook)	2	1:55
Qualifies for K-1 Grand Prix '97 final.
1997-07-20	Win	(Croatia) Branko Cikatić	K-1 Dream '97	Nagoya, Japan	KO (right hooks)	1	2:58
1997-04-29	Draw	(Switzerland) Andy Hug	K-1 Braves '97	Fukuoka, Japan	Decision draw	5	3:00
1996-12-08	Draw	(France) Jérôme Le Banner	K-1 Hercules '96	Nagoya, Japan	Decision draw	5	3:00
1996-10-18	Win	(United States) Gerry Harris	K-1 Star Wars '96	Yokohama, Japan	TKO	1	2:38
1996-09-01	NC	(Japan) Musashi	K-1 Revenge '96	Osaka, Japan	No contest	3	0:22
1996-05-06	Loss	(Japan) Musashi	K-1 Grand Prix '96 quarter-finals	Yokohama, Japan	TKO (doctor stoppage/broken toe)	1	3:00
1996-03-10	Win	(Suriname) Perry Telgt	K-1 Grand Prix '96 Opening Battle	Yokohama, Japan	Decision (unanimous)	5	3:00
Qualifies for K-1 Grand Prix '96 final.
1995-12-09	Win	(South Africa) Duane Van Der Merwe	K-1 Hercules	Nagoya, Japan	KO (kick)	1	1:24
1995-10-22	Win	(Australia) Stan Longinidis	The Best of the Best Tournament, Final	Melbourne, Australia	Decision (unanimous)	3	3:00
Wins The Best of the Best Tournament.
1995-10-22	Win	(Australia) Ben Hamilton	The Best of the Best Tournament, semi-finals	Melbourne, Australia	Decision (unanimous)	3	3:00
1995-10-22	Win	(Australia) Sam Sweet	The Best of the Best Tournament, quarter-finals	Melbourne, Australia	KO	1	
1995-09-03	Loss	(Netherlands) Peter Aerts	K-1 Revenge II	Yokohama, Japan	Decision (unanimous)	5	3:00
1995-03-03	Win	(Russia) Vjatcheslav Soukhanov	K-1 Grand Prix '95 Opening Battle	Tokyo, Japan	KO (punch)	3	1:33
Qualifies for K-1 Grand Prix '95 Final - would be unable to participate due to injury.
1994-12-10	Win	(Japan) Masaaki Satake	K-1 Legend	Nagoya, Japan	KO (right punch)	2	1:27
Wins Satake's W.K.A. World Muay Thai Super Heavyweight title.
1994-05-22	Win	(United States) Zennie Reynolds	ISKA - The Showdown	Melbourne, Australia	KO (high kick)	1	1:43
Wins the I.S.K.A. South Pacific Super Heavyweight title.
Legend: Win Loss Draw/no contest Notes

== Mixed martial arts record ==
Professional record breakdown
5 matches	3 wins	1 loss
By knockout	2	0
By submission	1	0
By decision	0	1
Draws	1	

Res.	Record	Opponent	Method	Event	Date	Round	Time	Location	Notes
Win	3–1–1	Shungo Oyama	KO (knees and punches)	Hero's 3	9 July 2005	1	2:37	Tokyo, Japan	
Win	2–1–1	Heath Herring	TKO (knee injury)	Hero's 1	26 March 2005	1	2:41	Saitama, Saitama, Japan	
Loss	1–1–1	Lyoto Machida	Decision (split)	K-1 MMA ROMANEX	22 May 2004	3	5:00	Saitama, Saitama, Japan	
Win	1–0–1	Stefan Gamlin	Submission (rear-naked choke)	K-1 Beast 2004 in Niigata	14 March 2004	1	0:25	Niigata Prefecture, Japan	
Draw	0–0–1	Masaaki Satake	Draw	Inoki Bom-Ba-Ye 2001	31 December 2001	3	5:00	Saitama, Saitama, Japan	

== See also ==
- List of K-1 events
- List of K-1 champions
- List of male kickboxers
