= K-1 PREMIUM 2004 Dynamite!! =

K-1 martial arts event in 2004

- The poster for K-1 PREMIUM 2004 Dynamite!!
- Promotion: K-1
- Date: December 31, 2004
- Venue: Osaka Dome (Japan)
- City: Osaka, Japan
- Attendance: 52,918

Event chronology
K-1 PREMIUM 2003 Dynamite!!	K-1 PREMIUM 2004 Dynamite!!	K-1 PREMIUM 2005 Dynamite!!

K-1 PREMIUM 2004 Dynamite!! was an annual kickboxing and mixed martial arts event held by K-1 on New Year's Eve, Friday, December 31, 2004 at the Osaka Dome in Osaka, Japan. It featured 7 K-1 MMA rules fights, 3 K-1 rules fights, and a special mixed K-1 & MMA Rules fight.

The event attracted a sellout crowd of 52,918 to the Osaka Dome, and was broadcast across Japan on the TBS Network.

In the main event, Royce Gracie defeated Sumo legend Akebono in a K-1 MMA Rules match.

== Results ==
Main card
Weight class				Method	Round	Time	Notes
Heavyweight K-1 MMA	(Brazil) Royce Gracie	def.	(Japan) Akebono	Submission (omoplata)	1	2:13
Heavyweight	(France) Jérôme Le Banner	def.	(United States) Bob Sapp	Draw (time limit)	4	3:00	(Note: The fight was declared a draw. The rules for the fight stipulated that rounds 1 and 3 would be fought with K-1 rules, and rounds 2 and 4 would be fought under MMA rules. There were no judges for this fight.)
Heavyweight K-1 MMA	(Japan) Kazuyuki Fujita	def.	(Egypt) Karam Ibrahim	KO (punch)	1	1:07
Lightweight K-1	(Japan) Masato	def.	(Japan) Norifumi "KID" Yamamoto	Decision (unanimous)	3	3:00
Heavyweight K-1	(Japan) Musashi	def.	(United States) Sean O'Haire	KO	2	0:44
Heavyweight K-1	(New Zealand) Ray Sefo	def.	(Trinidad and Tobago) Gary Goodridge	TKO (referee stoppage)	1	0:24
Heavyweight K-1 MMA	(United States) Don Frye	def.	(Japan) Yoshihiro Nakao	Decision (unanimous)	3	5:00
Lightweight K-1 MMA	(Japan) Caol Uno	def.	(Thailand) Chandet Sorpantrey	Submission (rear-naked choke)	2	0:19
Heavyweight K-1 MMA	(Japan) Yoshihiro Akiyama	def.	(South Africa) Francois Botha	Submission (armbar)	1	1:54
Heavyweight K-1 MMA	(Nigeria) Bobby Ologun	def.	(France) Cyril Abidi	Decision (unanimous)	3	5:00
Heavyweight K-1 MMA	(United States) The Predator	def.	(France) Kristof Midoux	Submission (neck crank)	1	1:11

== See also ==
- List of K-1 events
- List of male kickboxers
- PRIDE Shockwave 2004
