= Musashi (kickboxer) =

Japanese kickboxer

- Born: Akio Mori (森昭生); October 17, 1972 (age 54); Sakai, Osaka, Japan
- Native name: 武蔵
- Nationality: Japan
- Height: 1.85 m (6 ft 1 in)
- Weight: 103 kg (227 lb)
- Style: Seidokaikan karate, boxing, kickboxing
- Stance: Southpaw
- Trainer: Frankie Liles
- Years active: 1995–2009

Kickboxing record
- Total: 85
- Wins: 49
- By knockout: 19
- Losses: 30
- By knockout: 10
- Draws: 5
- No contests: 1
- Last updated on: September 26, 2009

Akio Mori (森 昭生, Mori Akio; born October 17, 1972), better known by the ring name Musashi (武蔵), is a Japanese former professional karateka and kickboxer. He is a four-time K-1 Japan tournament champion, a former WAKO Heavyweight Muay Thai champion and two-time K-1 World Grand Prix finalist. Following a 14-year career, he announced his retirement at a press conference in Tokyo on August 26, 2009.

He holds notable wins over Ray Sefo, Peter Aerts, Masaaki Satake and Rick Roufus.

== Early life and career ==
Mori was born in Sakai, Osaka, Japan. After he started practicing Seidokaikan karate, he took his ring name from the famous samurai Musashi Miyamoto, as his kicking techniques were said to resemble the latter's sword-slashing moves. Musashi took part in international karate competition, and this eventually overlapped with his kickboxing career. In 1995, he earned 4th place at the Seidokaikan Karate World Cup.

== K-1 ==
Musashi made his entrance into kickboxing and K-1 debut with an impressive knockout victory over fellow karate competitor Patrick Smith in 1995. Despite this initial splash, his first three years with the organization were mostly marked by loss, and he emerged from 1998 with a K-1 record of 4-8-1 (1). The following year saw a reversal in fortune, as Musashi secured his rival Kirkwood Walker’s WAKO Pro World Muay Thai Heavyweight title and won his first tournament – the K-1 Spirits '99 Japanese Grand Prix. The year ended with him earning entry to the K-1 Grand Prix '99 final round, but advancing no further than the quarter-finals.

He spent much of the following three years achieving noteworthy but limited success. He won the K-1 Spirits 2000 and K-1 Andy Spirits Japan GP 2002 Final tournaments, but regularly lost to top stars like Ernesto Hoost and Jérôme Le Banner. This changed with his entry to the K-1 World Grand Prix 2003. On December 6, 2003, Musashi defeated six-time world titlist Ray Sefo and three-time K-1 World Grand Prix champion Peter Aerts en route to the finale against rising superstar Remy Bonjasky. Musashi lost the match by unanimous decision after Bonjasky repeatedly penetrated the weary fighter’s defenses.

Despite this loss, Musashi’s runner-up status in K-1’s most prestigious annual tournament elevated him to prominence. Upholding his new standard, he remained undefeated throughout most of the following year, achieving a four-match winning streak that brought him to the K-1 World Grand Prix 2004. He defeated returning opponent Ray Sefo and Thai sensation Kaoklai Kaennorsing before meeting Remy Bonjasky in the finals for the second time. The match was a furious contest, with Musashi bringing his opponent to one knee with low kicks and sending Bonjasky out of the ring by dodging a lunging kick. With the judges undecided after the initial three rounds, an additional round was ordered, and then another. Despite showcasing excellent agility throughout by evading Bonjasky’s kicks and knees, Musashi was visibly exhausted by the final round and endured several unanswered strikes that resulted in his defeat by unanimous decision.

The bout marked the last time Musashi reached the WGP finals, though he made it to the semifinals the following year. His regional tournament wins were behind him now, too: despite winning his semifinal match at the K-1 World Grand Prix 2007 in Hong Kong, a groin injury kept him from advancing. Over the next four years, Musashi accumulated wins and losses fairly evenly. He sought retirement as the end of the decade neared and announced his intentions on August 26, 2009, along with a request to enter the WGP one last time. Despite not having fought that year or being among the previous year's top eight competitors, Musashi was inserted into the tournament's elimination rounds by popular vote and fought what was to be his final match on September 26, 2009 at the K-1 World Grand Prix 2009 in Seoul Final 16. He faced longtime K-1 veteran Jérôme Le Banner and put on a valiant performance, avoiding Le Banner’s heavy strikes while landing his own. Then, in the final 40 seconds of the third round, he was knocked down by a powerful combination. In the end, Le Banner won by unanimous decision. Failing to qualify for the year’s WGP, Musashi – age 37 – announced that he would not enter the ring again.

At the time of his retirement, Musashi was arguably the most successful active Japanese kickboxer of the heavyweight division. An ex-world champion and winner of four regional tournaments, he was also one of only nine fighters to reach the WGP finals more than once. During his 14-year career, he defeated at least eight current or former world champions and one WGP winner.

== Post–K-1 ==
In August 2009, Musashi co-founded the martial arts promotional company Pound for Pound Co., Ltd. with his younger brother (and fellow K-1 alumnus) Tomo. He currently serves as the company’s senior managing director.

In 2010, the company produced the Musashi Rock Festival – a combination rock concert and fighting event. The show took place on October 23 in Tokyo and featured performances by Sex Machineguns, Maximum the Hormone, and Loudness. The main event was an exhibition kickboxing match between Musashi and his brother. After fighting his sibling to a two-round draw, Musashi joined Sex Machineguns onstage to perform the songs "Iron Fighter" and "Death Game." Musashi has stated that he would like to hold the festival again in the future.

== Media ==
Beginning in the mid-2000s, Musashi engaged in an acting and television career. His first dramatic role was as a guest star in the mystery series Kyôto chiken no onna, and he was a frequent guest on Japanese talk shows and variety programs. His most famous role was playing Issei Kurosaki/Kamen Rider Caucasus in the 2006 tokusatsu superhero film Kamen Rider Kabuto: God Speed Love.

In conjunction with the film part, Musashi provided voice acting for the same character in the video game Kamen Rider: Battride War II.

Musashi also appeared in the music videos for "Bonds" by Galneryus and the Mihimaru GT/Soffett collaborations "Skinats" and "Crying Summer."

Musashi's entrance theme - "Battleship Musashi" - was recorded by Japanese heavy metal band Loudness. Musashi took part in the band's 25th anniversary concert at the Tokyo International Forum, where he personally congratulated the performers.

== Fighting style ==
Musashi's manner of fighting was fairly unique for a K-1 front runner in that he was a technical fighter who relied primarily on his fists for offense. A longtime student of former WBA Super Middleweight champion Frankie Liles, Musashi would continually employ the powerful kicks that inspired his stage name but focused on punching combinations to wear down his opponents. He was a conservative fighter whose technical approach resulted in relatively few knockout victories for a K-1 headliner, but he also boasted a steely defense that made KO losses a rarity as well.

K-1 producer Sadaharu Tanikawa and fighter Peter Aerts have praised Musashi's strong defense, with Aerts also complimenting his kicking and clinch-fighting abilities. Conversely, Aerts criticized his punching power and Tanikawa his lack of aggressiveness.

== Titles ==
- K-1
  - K-1 World Grand Prix 2004 runner-up
  - K-1 World Grand Prix 2003 runner-up
  - K-1 Survival 2003 Japan Grand Prix Final champion
  - K-1 Andy Spirits Japan GP 2002 Final champion
  - K-1 Andy Memorial 2001 Japan GP Final runner-up
  - K-1 Spirits 2000 champion
  - K-1 Spirits '99 champion
- World Association of Kickboxing Organizations
  - 1999 WAKO Pro World Heavyweight Muay Thai Champion

== Kickboxing record ==
Kickboxing record
49 wins (19 (T)KOs, 30 decisions), 30 losses, 1 no contest, 5 draws
| Date | Result | Opponent | Event | Location | Method | Round | Time | Record |
| 2009-09-26 | Loss | (France) Jérôme Le Banner | K-1 World Grand Prix 2009 in Seoul Final 16 | Seoul, South Korea | Decision (unanimous) | 3 | 3:00 | 49-30-1-5 |
Fails to qualify for K-1 World Grand Prix 2009.
| 2008-12-31 | Loss | (Netherlands) Gegard Mousasi | Dynamite!! 2008 | Saitama, Japan | TKO (referee stoppage) | 1 | 2:32 | 49-29-1-5 |
| 2008-04-13 | Loss | (Brazil) Ewerton Teixeira | K-1 World Grand Prix 2008 in Seoul Final 16 | Seoul, South Korea | Decision (unanimous) | 3 | 3:00 | 49-28-1-5 |
Fails to qualify for K-1 World Grand Prix 2008.
| 2008-06-29 | Loss | (Japan) Kyotaro | K-1 World GP 2008 in Fukuoka | Fukuoka, Japan | Decision (majority) | 3 | 3:00 | 49-27-1-5 |
| 2008-04-13 | Win | (Japan) Junichi Sawayashiki | K-1 World Grand Prix 2008 in Yokohama | Yokohama, Japan | KO (left straight punch) | 2 | 2:00 | 49-26-1-5 |
| 2007-12-31 | Win | (Ivory Coast) Bernard Ackah | K-1 PREMIUM 2007 Dynamite!! | Osaka, Japan | KO (left hook) | 3 | 1:26 | 48-26-1-5 |
| 2007-12-08 | Win | (France) David Dancrade | K-1 World Grand Prix 2007 Super Fight | Yokohama, Japan | KO (left mid kick) | 1 | 2:59 | 47-26-1-5 |
| 2007-08-05 | Win | (China) Wang Qiang | K-1 World Grand Prix 2007 in Hong Kong Semi-finals | Hong Kong | Disqualification | 2 | 2:00 | 46-26-1-5 |
Despite win was unable to continue in tournament due to groin injury.
| 2007-08-05 | Win | (South Korea) Yong Soo Park | K-1 World Grand Prix 2007 in Hong Kong Quarter-finals | Hong Kong | KO (left hook) | 2 | 0:48 | 45-26-1-5 |
| 2007-03-04 | Loss | (Japan) Yusuke Fujimoto | K-1 World Grand Prix 2007 in Yokohama | Yokohama, Japan | Ext.R KO (high kick) | 4 | 0:33 | 44-26-1-5 |
Fight was a qualification bout for the newly created K-1 Heavyweight title.
| 2006-12-31 | Win | (South Korea) Randy Kim | K-1 PREMIUM 2006 Dynamite!! | Osaka, Japan | KO (right punch) | 3 | 0:33 | 44-25-1-5 |
| 2006-12-02 | Loss | (Netherlands) Peter Aerts | K-1 World Grand Prix 2006 Reserve Fight | Tokyo, Japan | KO (punches) | 1 | 2:53 | 43-25-1-5 |
| 2006-09-30 | Loss | (Morocco) Chalid Arrab | K-1 World Grand Prix 2006 in Osaka opening round | Osaka, Japan | Decision (split) | 3 | 3:00 | 43-24-1-5 |
Fails to qualify for K-1 World Grand Prix 2006 although he will be invited as a Reservist.
| 2006-07-30 | Loss | (Brazil) Glaube Feitosa | K-1 World Grand Prix 2006 in Sapporo | Sapporo, Japan | Decision (unanimous) | 3 | 3:00 | 43-23-1-5 |
| 2006-04-29 | Loss | (Netherlands) Semmy Schilt | K-1 World Grand Prix 2005 | Las Vegas, Nevada, USA | Decision (unanimous) | 3 | 3:00 | 43-22-1-5 |
| 2005-12-31 | Win | (United States) Bob Sapp | K-1 PREMIUM 2005 Dynamite!! | Osaka, Japan | Decision (unanimous) | 3 | 3:00 | 43-21-1-5 |
| 2005-11-19 | Loss | (Brazil) Glaube Feitosa | K-1 World Grand Prix 2005 Semi-finals | Tokyo, Japan | KO (flying knee) | 2 | 1:05 | 42-21-1-5 |
| 2005-11-19 | Win | (Russia) Ruslan Karaev | K-1 World Grand Prix 2005 Quarter-finals | Tokyo, Japan | Ext.R decision (unanimous) | 4 | 3:00 | 42-20-1-5 |
| 2005-09-23 | Win | (South Africa) Francois Botha | K-1 World Grand Prix 2005 in Osaka – final elimination | Osaka, Japan | Decision (unanimous) | 3 | 3:00 | 41-20-1-5 |
Qualifies for K-1 World Grand Prix 2005.
| 2005-07-29 | Win | (Sweden) Rickard Nordstrand | K-1 World Grand Prix 2005 in Hawaii | Honolulu, Hawaii, USA | Decision (majority) | 3 | 3:00 | 40-20-1-5 |
| 2005-04-30 | Win | (United States) Rick Roufus | K-1 World Grand Prix 2005 in Las Vegas | Las Vegas, Nevada, USA | Decision (split) | 3 | 3:00 | 39-20-1-5 |
| 2004-12-31 | Win | (United States) Sean O'Haire | K-1 PREMIUM 2004 Dynamite!! | Osaka, Japan | KO | 2 | 0:44 | 38-20-1-5 |
| 2004-02-15 | Loss | (Netherlands) Remy Bonjasky | K-1 World Grand Prix 2004 Final | Tokyo, Japan | 2nd ext.R decision (unanimous) | 5 | 3:00 | 37-20-1-5 |
Fight was for K-1 World Grand Prix 2004 title.
| 2004-02-15 | Win | (Thailand) Kaoklai Kaennorsing | K-1 World Grand Prix 2004 Semi-finals | Tokyo, Japan | Ext.R decision (unanimous) | 4 | 3:00 | 37-19-1-5 |
| 2004-02-15 | Win | (New Zealand) Ray Sefo | K-1 World Grand Prix 2004 Quarter-finals | Tokyo, Japan | Ext.R decision (unanimous) | 4 | 3:00 | 36-19-1-5 |
| 2004-09-25 | Win | (France) Cyril Abidi | K-1 World Grand Prix 2004 final elimination | Tokyo, Japan | Decision (unanimous) | 3 | 3:00 | 35-19-1-5 |
Qualifies for K-1 World Grand Prix 2004.
| 2004-06-06 | Win | (United States) Ray Mercer | K-1 World Grand Prix 2004 in Nagoya | Nagoya, Japan | Decision (unanimous) | 3 | 3:00 | 34-19-1-5 |
| 2004-03-27 | Win | (Japan) Akebono | K-1 World Grand Prix 2004 in Saitama | Saitama, Japan | Decision (unanimous) | 3 | 3:00 | 33-19-1-5 |
| 2004-02-15 | Win | (United States) Stefan Gamlin | K-1 Burning 2004 | Okinawa, Japan | KO | 2 | 0:53 | 32-19-1-5 |
| 2003-12-06 | Loss | (Netherlands) Remy Bonjasky | K-1 World Grand Prix 2003 Final | Tokyo, Japan | Decision (unanimous) | 3 | 3:00 | 31-19-1-5 |
Fight was for K-1 World Grand Prix 2003 title.
| 2003-12-06 | Win | (Netherlands) Peter Aerts | K-1 World Grand Prix 2003 Semi-finals | Tokyo, Japan | Decision (majority) | 3 | 3:00 | 31-18-1-5 |
| 2003-12-06 | Win | (New Zealand) Ray Sefo | K-1 World Grand Prix 2003 Quarter-finals | Tokyo, Japan | Decision (majority) | 3 | 3:00 | 30-18-1-5 |
| 2003-09-21 | Win | (Japan) Yusuke Fujimoto | K-1 Survival 2003 Japan Grand Prix Final | Yokohama, Japan | Ext.R decision (majority) | 3 | 3:00 | 29-18-1-5 |
Wins K-1 Survival 2003 Japan Grand Prix title and qualifies for K-1 World Grand Prix 2003.
| 2003-09-21 | Win | (Japan) Hiraku Hori | K-1 Survival 2003 Japan Grand Prix Semi-finals | Yokohama, Japan | KO (left low kick) | 2 | 3:00 | 28-18-1-5 |
| 2003-09-21 | Win | (Brazil) Montanha Silva | K-1 Survival 2003 Japan Grand Prix Quarter-finals | Yokohama, Japan | Decision (unanimous) | 3 | 3:00 | 27-18-1-5 |
| 2003-07-27 | Draw | (Australia) Chris Chrisopoulides | K-1 World Grand Prix 2003 in Melbourne | Melbourne, Australia | Decision draw | 3 | 3:00 | 26-18-1-5 |
| 2003-06-29 | Win | (Brazil) Montanha Silva | K-1 Beast II 2003 | Saitama, Japan | DQ (punch to a downed opponent) | 2 | 1:50 | 26-18-1-4 |
| 2003-05-02 | Win | (Japan) Nobuaki Kakuda | K-1 World Grand Prix 2003 in Las Vegas | Las Vegas, Nevada, USA | Decision (unanimous) | 3 | 3:00 | 25-18-1-4 |
| 2003-04-06 | Draw | (Trinidad and Tobago) Gary Goodridge | K-1 Beast 2003 | Yamagata, Japan | Decision draw | 5 | 3:00 | 24-18-1-4 |
| 2002-12-07 | Loss | (France) Jérôme Le Banner | K-1 World Grand Prix 2002 Quarter-finals | Tokyo, Japan | TKO (corner stoppage) | 2 | 0:51 | 24-18-1-3 |
| 2002-09-22 | Win | (Japan) Tsuyoshi Nakasako | K-1 Andy Spirits Japan GP 2002 Final | Osaka, Japan | 2nd ext.R decision (unanimous) | 5 | 3:00 | 24-17-1-3 |
Wins K-1 Andy Spirits 2002 Japan Grand Prix title and qualifies for K-1 World Grand Prix 2002.
| 2002-09-22 | Win | (Japan) Tatsufumi Tomihira | K-1 Andy Spirits Japan GP 2002 Semi-finals | Osaka, Japan | Decision (unanimous) | 3 | 3:00 | 23-17-1-3 |
| 2002-09-22 | Win | (Japan) Hiromi Amada | K-1 Andy Spirits Japan GP 2002 Quarter-finals | Osaka, Japan | Ext.R decision (majority) | 4 | 3:00 | 22-17-1-3 |
| 2002-07-14 | Win | (United States) Josh Dempsey | K-1 World Grand Prix 2002 in Fukuoka | Fukuoka, Japan | Decision (unanimous) | 5 | 3:00 | 21-17-1-3 |
| 2002-04-21 | Loss | (Netherlands) Semmy Schilt | K-1 Burning 2002 | Hiroshima, Japan | Decision (split) | 5 | 3:00 | 20-17-1-3 |
| 2002-03-03 | Draw | (Brazil) Glaube Feitosa | K-1 World Grand Prix 2002 in Nagoya | Nagoya, Japan | Decision draw | 5 | 3:00 | 20-16-1-3 |
| 2002-01-11 | Win | (Japan) Ryuta Noji | Ichigeki | Tokyo, Japan | Decision (majority) | 5 | 3:00 | 20-16-1-2 |
| 2001-08-19 | Loss | (Denmark) Nicholas Pettas | K-1 Andy Memorial 2001 Japan GP Final | Saitama, Japan | Ext.R decision (unanimous) | 4 | 3:00 | 19-16-1-2 |
Fight was for K-1 Andy Memorial 2001 Japan Grand Prix title. With this defeat Musashi also fails to qualify for the K-1 World Grand Prix 2001.
| 2001-08-19 | Win | (Japan) Tsuyoshi Nakasako | K-1 Andy Memorial 2001 Japan GP Semi-finals | Saitama, Japan | Decision (unanimous) | 3 | 3:00 | 19-15-1-2 |
| 2001-08-19 | Win | (Japan) Toru Oishi | K-1 Andy Memorial 2001 Japan GP Quarter-finals | Saitama, Japan | Decision (unanimous) | 3 | 3:00 | 18-15-1-2 |
| 2001-06-24 | Draw | (Brazil) Ebenezer Braga | K-1 Survival 2001 | Sendai, Japan | Decision draw | 5 | 3:00 | 17-15-1-2 |
| 2001-04-15 | Loss | (Netherlands) Ernesto Hoost | K-1 Burning 2001 | Kumamoto, Japan | Decision (majority) | 5 | 3:00 | 17-15-1-1 |
| 2000-12-10 | Loss | (New Zealand) Ray Sefo | K-1 World Grand Prix 2000 Quarter-finals | Tokyo, Japan | TKO | 1 | 1:38 | 17-14-1-1 |
| 2000-07-07 | Win | (Japan) Hiromi Amada | K-1 Spirits 2000 Final | Sendai, Japan | Decision (unanimous) | 3 | 3:00 | 17-13-1-1 |
Wins K-1 Spirits 2000 Japan Grand Prix title and qualifies for K-1 World Grand Prix 2000.
| 2000-07-07 | Win | (China) An Hu | K-1 Spirits 2000 Semi-finals | Sendai, Japan | TKO (low kicks) | 1 | 1:25 | 16-13-1-1 |
| 2000-07-07 | Win | (Japan) Ryūshi Yanagisawa | K-1 Spirits 2000 Quarter-finals | Sendai, Japan | Decision (unanimous) | 3 | 3:00 | 15-13-1-1 |
| 2000-05-28 | Win | (Japan) Tatsufumi Tomihira | K-1 Burning 2000 | Sapporo, Japan | Decision (unanimous) | 3 | 3:00 | 14-13-1-1 |
Qualifies for K-1 Spirits 2000 Japan Grand Prix.
| 2000-03-19 | Loss | (Switzerland) Andy Hug | K-1 Burning 2000 | Yokohama, Japan | Decision (majority) | 5 | 3:00 | 13-13-1-1 |
| 2000-01-25 | Loss | (Netherlands) Peter Aerts | K-1 Rising 2000 | Nagasaki, Japan | Ext.R TKO (corner stoppage) | 4 | 1:25 | 13-12-1-1 |
| 1999-12-05 | Loss | (Croatia) Mirko Cro Cop | K-1 Grand Prix '99 final round Quarter-finals | Tokyo, Japan | TKO (2 knockdowns) | 2 | 1:13 | 13-11-1-1 |
| 1999-10-05 | Win | (Japan) Masaaki Satake | K-1 World Grand Prix '99 opening round | Osaka, Japan | Decision (unanimous) | 5 | 3:00 | 13-10-1-1 |
Qualifies for K-1 Grand Prix '99 final round.
| 1999-08-22 | Win | (Japan) Nobu Hayashi | K-1 Spirits '99 Final | Tokyo, Japan | Decision (unanimous) | 3 | 3:00 | 12-10-1-1 |
Wins K-1 Spirits Japanese Grand Prix '99 title.
| 1999-08-22 | Win | (Japan) Hiromi Amada | K-1 Spirits '99 Semi-finals | Tokyo, Japan | Decision (unanimous) | 3 | 3:00 | 11-10-1-1 |
| 1999-08-22 | Win | (Japan) Mitsuya Nagai | K-1 Spirits '99 Quarter-finals | Tokyo, Japan | KO (left mid kick) | 1 | 3:00 | 10-10-1-1 |
| 1999-08-22 | Win | (Japan) Motoharu Yoshioka | K-1 Spirits '99 1st round | Tokyo, Japan | TKO (referee stoppage) | 2 | 2:13 | 9-10-1-1 |
| 1999-06-20 | Win | (United Kingdom) Kirkwood Walker | K-1 Braves '99 | Fukuoka, Japan | KO (left mid kick) | 5 | 1:50 | 8-10-1-1 |
Wins Walker's W.A.K.O. Pro World Muay Thai Heavyweight title.
| 1999-04-25 | Win | (Trinidad and Tobago) Gary Goodridge | K-1 Revenge '99 | Yokohama, Japan | Disqualification | 1 | 2:15 | 7-10-1-1 |
| 1999-03-22 | Win | (United States) Greg Vojtieck | K-1 The Challenge '99 | Tokyo, Japan | TKO (3 knockdowns) | 2 | 2:03 | 6-10-1-1 |
| 1998-10-28 | Loss | (United Kingdom) Kirkwood Walker | Lords of the Ring III | England, UK | Decision | 5 | 3:00 | 5-10-1-1 |
Fight was for Walker's W.A.K.O. Pro World Muay Thai Heavyweight title.
| 1999-02-03 | Win | (Scotland) Duncan Airlie James | K-1 Rising Sun '99 | Tokyo, Japan | TKO (3 knockdowns) | 2 | 2:52 | 5-9-1-1 |
| 1998-10-28 | Loss | (United Kingdom) Michael Thompson | K-1 Japan '98 Kamikaze | Tokyo, Japan | Decision (majority) | 5 | 3:00 | 4-9-1-1 |
| 1998-07-18 | Loss | (Netherlands) Ernesto Hoost | K-1 Dream '98 | Nagoya, Japan | TKO (referee stoppage) | 3 | 2:52 | 4-8-1-1 |
| 1998-05-24 | Draw | (Japan) Masaaki Satake | K-1 Braves '98 | Fukuoka, Japan | Decision draw | 5 | 3:00 | 4-7-1-1 |
| 1997-07-07 | Loss | (United Kingdom) Michael Thompson | K-1 Fight Night '97 | Zurich, Switzerland | Decision (unanimous) | 5 | 3:00 | 4-7-1 |
| 1997-04-29 | Loss | (United Kingdom) Kirkwood Walker | K-1 Braves '97 | Fukuoka, Japan | KO (straight right) | 5 | 1:12 | 4-6-1 |
Fight was for Walker's W.A.K.O. Pro World Muay Thai Heavyweight title.
| 1997-03-16 | Loss | (Croatia) Branko Cikatić | K-1 Kings '97 | Yokohama, Japan | KO (right hook) | 4 | 1:38 | 4-5-1 |
| 1996-12-08 | Loss | (Switzerland) Andy Hug | K-1 Hercules '96 | Nagoya, Japan | Decision (unanimous) | 5 | 3:00 | 4-4-1 |
| 1996-10-18 | Win | (Canada) Jean Riviere | K-1 Star Wars '96 | Yokohama, Japan | Decision (unanimous) | 5 | 3:00 | 4-3-1 |
| 1996-09-01 | No contest | (Australia) Sam Greco | K-1 Revenge '96 | Osaka, Japan | No contest | 3 | 0:22 | 3-3-1 |
Fight was declared no contest after Musashi fell out of the ring.
| 1996-07-20 | Loss | (Thailand) Sadau Kiatsongrit | W.M.T.C. Cruiserweight World Title Fight | Buriram, Thailand | Decision (unanimous) | 5 | 3:00 | 3-3 |
Fight was for Kiatsongrit's W.M.T.C. Cruiserweight World title.
| 1996-05-06 | Loss | (South Africa) Mike Bernardo | K-1 Grand Prix '96 Semi-finals | Yokohama, Japan | Decision (unanimous) | 3 | 3:00 | 3-2 |
| 1996-05-06 | Win | (Australia) Sam Greco | K-1 Grand Prix '96 Quarter-finals | Yokohama, Japan | TKO (doctor stoppage/dislocation of right foot toe) | 1 | 3:00 | 3-1 |
| 1996-03-10 | Win | (United States) Kit Lykins | K-1 Grand Prix '96 Opening Battle | Yokohama, Japan | KO (low kick) | 1 | 0:37 | 2-1 |
Qualifies for K-1 Grand Prix '96.
| 1995-12-09 | Loss | (Australia) Stan Longinidis | K-1 Hercules | Nagoya, Japan | Decision (unanimous) | 5 | 3:00 | 1-1 |
| 1995-09-03 | Win | (United States) Patrick Smith | K-1 Revenge II | Yokohama, Japan | KO (high kick) | 2 | 0:34 | 1-0 |
Legend: Win Loss Draw/no contest Notes

== Karate World Cup fights ==
Karate record
| Date | Result | Opponent | Event | Location | Method |
|---|---|---|---|---|---|
| 1995-10-08 | Loss | (Japan) Shingo Koyasu | Karate World Cup '95 3rd place Qualifying Match | Japan | Decision (unanimous) |
| 1995-10-08 | Loss | (South Korea) Kim Tae Won | Karate World Cup '95 Semifinals | Japan | Decision (unanimous) |
| 1995-10-08 | Win | (Japan) Shuichi Nishida | Karate World Cup '95 Quarterfinals | Japan | |
| 1995-10-08 | Win | (Japan) Shin Kishigawa | Karate World Cup '95 | Japan | Decision (unanimous) |
Legend: Win Loss Draw/no contest Notes

== Filmography ==
=== Film ===
| Year | Title | Role | Notes |
|---|---|---|---|
| 2013 | Moon Dream | Police Officer Teru | Biographical film of Bobby Ologun |
| 2013 | Goddotan Kiss Patience Championship - The Movie | Captain Gryphon | Feature film adaptation of Goddotan |
| 2009 | 20th Century Boys 3: Redemption | Norimono Ogaki | |
| 2006 | Kamen Rider Kabuto: God Speed Love | Issei Kurosaki / Kamen Rider Caucasus | |

=== TV ===
| Year | Title | Role | Notes |
|---|---|---|---|
| 2015 | One Way | Dota | 9-episode drama based on the novel by Jirō Asada |
| 2015 | Ichirō | | 9-episode miniseries |
| 2011 | Sazae-san 3 | Anago | Live-action adaptation of Sazae-san |
| 2006 | El poporatchi go!! | Shop owner of ramen stall 634 | Guest appearance |
| 2005 | Furuhata Ninzaburō | | Guest appearance |
| 2004 | The Woman Prosecutor of Kyôto | | Guest appearance |

== See also ==
- List of K-1 events
- List of K-1 champions
- List of male kickboxers
