= Ray Sefo =

New Zealander kickboxer, boxer and mixed martial arts fighter

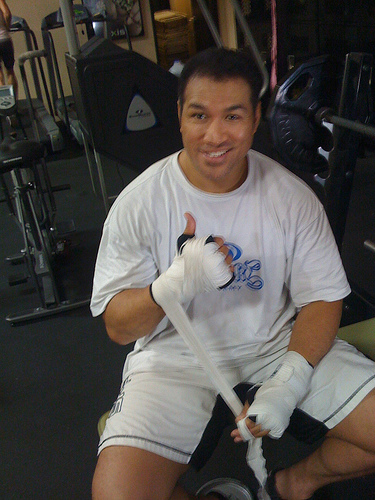
- Born: 15 February 1971 (age 55); Auckland, New Zealand
- Other names: Sugarfoot
- Height: 1.83 m (6 ft 0 in)
- Weight: 120 kg (265 lb; 18 st 13 lb)
- Division: Light Heavyweight; Cruiserweight; Heavyweight
- Reach: 75 in (191 cm)
- Style: Kickboxing
- Stance: Orthodox
- Fighting out of: Las Vegas, Nevada, US
- Team: Xtreme Couture; Ray Sefo's Fight Academy
- Years active: 1989–2012 (Kickboxing); 1989–2012 (Muay Thai); 1994–2001 (Boxing); 2005–2013 (MMA)

Professional boxing record
- Total: 6
- Wins: 5
- By knockout: 4
- Losses: 1

Kickboxing record
- Total: 79
- Wins: 56
- By knockout: 38
- Losses: 22
- By knockout: 11
- Draws: 1

Mixed martial arts record
- Total: 4
- Wins: 2
- By knockout: 2
- Losses: 2
- By knockout: 1
- By submission: 1

Other information
- Notable relatives: Afioga Valelia Sefo “mother”, Ioane Leilua Sefo “father”, Rony Sefo, brother Selestina Brown Soifua “sister”, Antz Nansen, cousin Baby Nansen, cousin
- Boxing record from BoxRec
- Mixed martial arts record from Sherdog
- Last updated on: 11 May 2011

Ray Sefo(born 15 February 1971) is a New Zealand fight promoter and retired kickboxer, boxer, and mixed martial artist. He was the K-1 World Grand Prix 2000 Runner-up, is a six-time Muay Thai World Champion, and was an eight time K-1 World Grand Prix Finals tournament participant. He is the president of MMA promotion Professional Fighters League. In kickboxing, he defeated world champions Jerome Le Banner, Peter Aerts, Stefan Leko, Mike Bernardo, and Mark Hunt. He is widely considered to be one of the greatest heavyweight kickboxers to have never won the K-1 World Grand Prix. As mixed martial artist, he most notably competed in the now defunct Strikeforce in 2009 and 2011.

== Background ==
Training in Boxing as a youth, Sefo moved to Muay Thai under Thai fighting legend Kiosot, then continued training under Lollo Heimuli at the infamous Balmoral Lee Gar Gym.

== Career ==
=== Early career ===
Sefo had an impressive unbeaten record as an amateur and a professional in the Oceania kickboxing league. Early in his career, he trained at Balmoral Lee Gar gym alongside Jason Suttie, Jayson Vemoa, Doug Viney, John Conway, and his brother, Rony Sefo. In 1996, Ray Sefo fought Andre Mannaart in a kickboxing match and overwhelmed Manaart with devastating speed and elusive footwork, knocking him down on numerous occasions. In the ring after the fight, Mannaart took the microphone and said, "...you should call him Sugarfist, not Sugarfoot..." Sefo's first major breakthrough was becoming a WKA Cruiserweight Champion. He also acted as a sparring partner for fellow New Zealander David Tua, when Tua first returned to New Zealand for a fight after turning pro.

=== K-1 ===
Sefo made his K-1 debut against future four-time World Grand Prix Champion, Ernesto Hoost. Sefo held his own against the much more experienced Hoost but was finally knocked out in the 4th round by a leg kick. Sefo gained respect for standing up to such an elite fighter in just his first fight. Sefo gained more respect in his third K-1 fight where he knocked out K-1 legend Jerome Lebanner in the 1st round. Sefo's hard right hand was enough to break the Frenchman's jaw in four places.

Sefo had an up and down first few years in K-1, unable to make it past the quarter-finals in the K-1 World Grand Prix against the likes of Sam Greco and Andy Hug. In 2000, he made it to the WGP final after knocking out Japanese star Musashi and French kickboxer Cyril Abidi, before losing again to Hoost. In 2002, Sefo defeated Dutch legend Peter Aerts in the quarter-finals but lost again to his nemesis Hoost in the semi-finals.

In 2007, Sefo was thought to be a legitimate challenger to dethrone four-time World Grand Prix Champion Semmy Schilt for the new Super Heavyweight title. In the 1st round, Sefo became only the second man in history to knock Schilt down. However, he would go on to lose by KO in the second round. He went on to lose five more fights and would not find the winners circle again until he beat Choi Hong-man, Yosuke Nishijima, and Ionut Iftimoaie, all by decision.

Sefo was then asked to fight at the K-1 World Grand Prix 2010 in Seoul Final 16 on ten days notice against Tyrone Spong. Sefo put up a decent fight on short preparation but was beaten by decision.

Sefo is one of the first Samoans to appear in a video game, featuring in K1 Premium 2004 Dynamite!! for PlayStation 2.

=== MMA and retirement ===
In mid-February 2011, Sefo, possessing and undefeated record of 2-0, had his third MMA fight in a reserve fight for the Strikeforce Heavyweight tournament. He fought Valentijn Overeem, brother of Alistair Overeem, the 2010 K-1 World Grand Prix champion. Overeem had 50 MMA fights behind him and beat Sefo by submission in the first round. Sefo's striking on the feet looked average, and as an inexperienced grappler, he lost quickly by neck crank.

On 12 June 2013, Sefo announced that he would return to fighting. At WSOF 3, Sefo announced that he would be facing Dave Huckaba. The two fought at World Series of Fighting 4 on 10 August 2013. Sefo lost the fight via TKO in the second round. In an interview in April 2015, Sefo said, "I actually made a promise to myself that this year will be my last year." He did not fight again after losing against Huckaba. While he considered fighting again, Sefo officially announced his retirement in 2018.

=== Executive career ===
Sefo is the current president of MMA promotion Professional Fighters League. He was named president when the promotion was still known as World Series of Fighting. He helped the promotion ink a deal with NBC Sports to air 8 to 10 events on its network.

== Titles ==
- K-1
  - 2000 K-1 World Grand Prix 2000 Runner-up.
- World Kickboxing Association
  - 1997 WKA World Super Heavyweight World Champion.
- World Muay Thai Federation
  - 1996 WMTF World Heavyweight Champion.
  - 1992 WMTF World Light Heavyweight Champion.
- International Sport Karate Association
  - 1996 ISKA World Super Cruiserweight Champion.
  - 1994 ISKA World Light Cruiserweight Champion.
- Regional
  - 1992 South Pacific Cruiserweight Champion.
  - 1991 New Zealand Cruiserweight Champion.
  - 1990 New Zealand Heavyweight Champion.

== Personal life ==
Sefo lives in Las Vegas, Nevada, and continues to train out of Xtreme Couture Mixed Martial Arts.

== Kickboxing record (incomplete) ==
Kickboxing record (Incomplete)
56 Wins (38 (T)KO's, 18 Decisions), 22 Losses (11 (T)KO's, 11 Decisions), 1 Draw
Date	Result	Opponent	Event	Location	Method	Round	Time	Record
2012-03-10	Loss	(Croatia) Mirko Cro Cop	Cro Cop Final Fight	Zagreb, Croatia	Decision (unanimous)	3	3:00	56-22-1
2010-10-02	Loss	(Suriname) Tyrone Spong	K-1 World Grand Prix 2010 in Seoul Final 16	Seoul, South Korea	Decision (unanimous)	3	3:00	56-21-1
Fails to qualify for K-1 World Grand Prix 2010 final.
2010-05-21	Win	(Romania) Ionuţ Iftimoaie	K-1 World Grand Prix 2010 in Bucharest	Bucharest, Romania	Decision (unanimous)	3	3:00	56-20-1
2009-12-31	Win	(Japan) Yosuke Nishijima	Dynamite!! 2009	Saitama, Japan	Decision (unanimous)	3	3:00	55-20-1
2008-12-06	Win	(South Korea) Choi Hong-man	K-1 World Grand Prix 2008 Final	Yokohama, Japan	Decision (unanimous)	3	3:00	54-20-1
2008-09-27	Loss	(Turkey) Gokhan Saki	K-1 World Grand Prix 2008 in Seoul Final 16	Seoul, Korea	Ext.R decision	4	3:00	53-20-1
Fails to qualify for K-1 World Grand Prix 2008 final.
2008-07-13	Loss	(Azerbaijan) Zabit Samedov	K-1 World Grand Prix 2008 in Taipei	Taipei City, Taiwan	2nd Ext.R decision (split)	5	3:00	53-19-1
2008-04-13	Loss	(Morocco) Badr Hari	K-1 World Grand Prix 2008 in Yokohama	Yokohama, Japan	TKO (referee stoppage)	1	2:43	53-18-1
2007-09-29	Loss	(Netherlands) Peter Aerts	K-1 World Grand Prix 2007 in Seoul Final 16	Seoul, South Korea	TKO (corner stoppage)	1	3:00	53-17-1
Fails to qualify for K-1 World Grand Prix 2007 final.
2007-08-11	Loss	(Switzerland) Bjorn Bregy	K-1 World Grand Prix 2007 in Las Vegas	Las Vegas, Nevada, USA	Decision (split)	3	3:00	53-16-1
2007-03-04	Loss	(Netherlands) Semmy Schilt	K-1 World Grand Prix 2007 in Yokohama	Yokohama, Japan	KO (punch)	2	0:26	53-15-1
Fight was for K-1 Super Heavyweight Title.
2006-12-02	Win	(Netherlands) Melvin Manhoef	K-1 World Grand Prix 2006 Final	Tokyo, Japan	KO (right hook)	1	0:40	53-14-1
2006-09-30	Loss	(Germany) Stefan Leko	K-1 World Grand Prix 2006 in Osaka opening round	Osaka, Japan	Ext.R decision (unanimous)	4	3:00	52-14-1
Loses fight but invited to K-1 World Grand Prix 2006 Final as Reservist.
2006-08-12	Win	(Albania) Azem Maksutaj	K-1 World Grand Prix 2006 in Las Vegas II	Las Vegas, Nevada, USA	TKO (referee stoppage)	3	2:02	52-13-1
2006-06-03	Win	(Russia) Ruslan Karaev	K-1 World Grand Prix 2006 in Seoul	Seoul, South Korea	KO (right hook)	1	1:42	51-13-1
2006-03-05	Win	(South Africa) Francois Botha	K-1 World Grand Prix 2006 in Auckland	Auckland, New Zealand	Decision (unanimous)	3	3:00	50-13-1
2005-11-19	Loss	(Netherlands) Semmy Schilt	K-1 World Grand Prix 2005 Final	Tokyo, Japan	Decision (unanimous)	3	3:00	49-13-1
2005-09-23	Win	(Thailand) Kaoklai Kaennorsing	K-1 World Grand Prix 2005 in Osaka – final elimination	Osaka, Japan	Decision (unanimous)	3	3:00	49-12-1
Qualifies for K-1 World Grand Prix 2005 final.
2005-06-14	Win	(Russia) Ruslan Karaev	K-1 World Grand Prix 2005 in Hiroshima	Hiroshima, Japan	TKO (referee stoppage)	1	0:37	48-12-1
2004-12-31	Win	(Trinidad and Tobago) Gary Goodridge	K-1 PREMIUM 2004 Dynamite!!	Osaka, Japan	KO (right Uppercuts)	1	0:24	47-12-1
2004-11-04	Loss	(Japan) Musashi	K-1 World Grand Prix 2004 Final	Tokyo, Japan	Ext.R decision (unanimous)	4	3:00	46-12-1
2004-09-25	Win	(Japan) Hiromi Amada	K-1 World Grand Prix 2004 final elimination	Tokyo, Japan	Decision (unanimous)	3	3:00	46-11-1
Qualifies for K-1 World Grand Prix 2004 final.
2004-08-07	Win	(United States) Marvin Eastman	K-1 World Grand Prix 2004 in Las Vegas II	Las Vegas, Nevada, USA	TKO (referee stoppage)	1	1:32	45-11-1
2004-06-26	Win	(United States) Bob Sapp	K-1 Beast 2004 in Shizuoka	Shizuoka, Japan	KO	2	0:29	44-11-1
2003-12-06	Loss	(Japan) Musashi	K-1 World Grand Prix 2003 Final	Tokyo, Japan	Decision (unanimous)	3	3:00	43-11-1
2003-10-11	Win	(United States) Carter Williams	K-1 World Grand Prix 2003 final elimination	Osaka, Japan	Decision (majority)	3	3:00	43-10-1
Qualifies for K-1 World Grand Prix 2003 final.
2003-07-13	Win	(Japan) Tatsufumi Tomihira	K-1 World Grand Prix 2003 in Fukuoka	Fukuoka, Japan	TKO (corner stoppage)	5	2:15	42-10-1
2003-03-30	Win	(England) Pelé Reid	K-1 World Grand Prix 2003 in Saitama	Saitama, Japan	TKO (corner stoppage)	3	1:15	41-10-1
2002-12-07	Loss	(Netherlands) Ernesto Hoost	K-1 World Grand Prix 2002 Final	Tokyo, Japan	TKO (Shin Injury)	1	1:49	40-10-1
2002-12-07	Win	(Netherlands) Peter Aerts	K-1 World Grand Prix 2002 Final	Tokyo, Japan	Decision (split)	3	3:00	40-9-1
2002-10-05	Win	(Sweden) Martin Holm	K-1 World Grand Prix 2002 final elimination	Saitama, Japan	Decision (majority)	3	3:00	39-9-1
Qualifies for K-1 World Grand Prix 2002 final.
2002-07-14	Win	(Netherlands) Gilbert Yvel	K-1 World Grand Prix 2002 in Fukuoka	Fukuoka, Japan	KO (Low Kicks)	2	2:07	38-9-1
2002-06-02	Win	(Brazil) Julio Cesar Santana	K-1 Survival 2002	Toyama, Japan	KO (right hook)	1	0:37	37-9-1
2002-03-03	Win	(South Africa) Mike Bernardo	K-1 World Grand Prix 2002 in Nagoya	Nagoya, Japan	Decision (unanimous)	5	3:00	36-9-1
2001-10-08	Win	(New Zealand) Mark Hunt	K-1 World Grand Prix 2001 in Fukuoka	Fukuoka, Japan	Decision (unanimous)	3	3:00	35-9-1
2001-06-24	Loss	(Netherlands) Remy Bonjasky	K-1 Survival 2001	Sendai, Japan	Ext.R TKO (corner stoppage)	4	3:00	34-9-1
2001-04-29	Win	(Australia) Adam Watt	K-1 World Grand Prix 2001 in Osaka	Osaka, Japan	TKO (right hook)	1	2:20	34-8-1
2001-03-17	Win	(Canada) Michael McDonald	K-1 Gladiators 2001	Yokohama, Japan	KO (right hook)	1	1:56	33-8-1
2000-12-10	Loss	(Netherlands) Ernesto Hoost	K-1 World Grand Prix 2000 Final	Tokyo, Japan	Decision (unanimous)	3	3:00	32-8-1
Fight was for K-1 World Grand Prix 2000 title.
2000-12-10	Win	(France) Cyril Abidi	K-1 World Grand Prix 2000 Final	Tokyo, Japan	TKO (referee stoppage)	1	1:45	32-7-1
2000-12-10	Win	(Japan) Musashi	K-1 World Grand Prix 2000 Final	Tokyo, Japan	TKO (referee stoppage)	1	1:38	31-7-1
2000-08-20	Loss	(France) Cyril Abidi	K-1 World Grand Prix 2000 in Yokohama	Yokohama, Japan	TKO (corner stoppage)	2	3:00	30-7-1
2000-08-20	Win	(Germany) Frank Otto	K-1 World Grand Prix 2000 in Yokohama	Yokohama, Japan	TKO (referee stoppage)	1	2:24	30-6-1
2000-08-20	Loss	(Netherlands) Peter Aerts	K-1 The Millennium	Osaka, Japan	KO (right low kick)	3	2:24	29-6-1
1999-12-05	Loss	(Australia) Sam Greco	K-1 World Grand Prix 1999 Final quarter-finals	Tokyo, Japan	Decision (unanimous)	3	3:00	29-5-1
1999-10-03	Win	(Morocco) Samir Benazzouz	K-1 World Grand Prix '99 opening round	Osaka, Japan	TKO (referee stoppage)	1	2:14	29-4-1
Qualifies for K-1 World Grand Prix 1999 final.
1999-06-06	Win	(United States) Jim Mullen	K-1 Survival '99	Sapporo, Japan	KO (right hook)	2	0:45	28-4-1
1999-04-25	Loss	(Switzerland) Andy Hug	K-1 Revenge '99	Yokohama, Japan	TKO (corner stoppage)	4	3:00	27-4-1
1998-12-13	Loss	(Switzerland) Andy Hug	K-1 World Grand Prix 1998 Final quarter-finals	Tokyo, Japan	TKO (referee Stoppage/Two Knockdowns)	2	2:28	27-3-1
1998-09-27	Win	(Germany) Stefan Leko	K-1 World Grand Prix '98 opening round	Osaka, Japan	Decision (unanimous)	5	3:00	27-2-1
Qualifies for K-1 World Grand Prix 1998 final.
1998-05-24	Loss	(England) Matt Skelton	K-1 Braves '98	Fukuoka, Japan	TKO (corner stoppage)	2	3:00	26-2-1
1998-04-09	Draw	(Brazil) Francisco Filho	K-1 Kings '98	Yokohama, Japan	Draw	5	3:00	26-1-1
1998-01-23	Win	(France) Stephane Reveillon	N/A	N/A	KO	2	N/A	26-1
Won WKBF Super Heavyweight title.
1997-10-00	Win	(United States) Jean-Claude Leuyer	N/A	N/A	Decision	5	3:00	25-1
1997-07-20	Win	(United States) Jean-Claude Leuyer	K-1 Dream '97	Nagoya, Japan	Decision (unanimous)	7	3:00	24-1
Won WKBA Super Heavyweight title.
1997-04-29	Win	(France) Jérôme Le Banner	K-1 Braves '97	Fukuoka, Japan	KO (right hook)	1	1:31	23-1
1997-03-16	Win	(Croatia) Petar Majstorovic	K-1 Kings '97	Yokohama, Japan	TKO (referee stoppage)	4	1:36	22-1
1996-12-08	Loss	(Netherlands) Ernesto Hoost	K-1 Hercules '96	Nagoya, Japan	KO (Low Kicks)	4	0:25	21-1
1996-09-09	Win	(England) Kirkwood Walker	N/A	Hong Kong	KO	N/A	N/A	21-0
Won WMTF World Heavyweight title.
1996-08-01	Win	(England) Lee Swaney	New Zealand vs England	Auckland, New Zealand	KO	N/A	N/A	20-0
1996-02-25	Win	(Netherlands) Andre Mannaart	NZ - AUS - HOL	Auckland, New Zealand	KO (punches)	4	N/A	19-0
Wins I.S.K.A. Super Cruiserweight World title.
1995-08-25	Win	(Canada) Michael McDonald	N/A	Auckland, New Zealand	KO (right hook)	3	N/A	18-0
For I.S.K.A. World Light Cruiserweight title.
1995-04-27	Win	(United States) Rob Martin	N/A	Auckland, New Zealand	KO (left hook)	1	N/A	
Won WMTF Light Heavyweight title.

== Boxing Record ==
Boxing record
5 Wins (4 (T)KO's, 1 Decision), 1 Loss (1 (T)KO)
Date	Result	Opponent	Location	Method	Round	Time	Record
2001-09-02	Loss	(United States) Chester Hughes	Elgin, Illinois, USA	KO	1	N/A	5–1
2001-06-03	Win	(United States) Joe Lenhart	Elgin, Illinois, USA	TKO	1	N/A	5–0
2001-02-11	Win	(United States) Steve Griffin	Elgin, Illinois, USA	TKO	1	N/A	4–0
1996-10-05	Win	(New Zealand) Nicky Faamata	Auckland, New Zealand	TKO	3	N/A	3–0
1995-03-16	Win	(New Zealand) Paul Baker	Auckland, New Zealand	PTS	4	N/A	2–0
1994-11-24	Win	(New Zealand) Alex Katu	Auckland, New Zealand	TKO	1	N/A	1–0
Legend: Win Loss Draw/No contest Notes

== Mixed martial arts record ==
Professional record breakdown
4 matches	2 wins	2 losses
By knockout	2	1
By submission	0	1

Res.	Record	Opponent	Method	Event	Date	Round	Time	Location	Notes
Loss	2–2	Dave Huckaba	TKO (punches)	WSOF 4	August 10, 2013	2	4:32	Ontario, California, United States	
Loss	2–1	Valentijn Overeem	Submission (neck crank)	Strikeforce: Fedor vs. Silva	February 12, 2011	1	1:37	East Rutherford, New Jersey, United States	
Win	2–0	Kevin Jordan	TKO (knee injury)	Strikeforce Challengers: Kennedy vs. Cummings	September 25, 2009	2	0:24	Bixby, Oklahoma, United States	
Win	1–0	Kim Min-soo	KO (head kick)	Hero's 2	July 6, 2005	2	0:30	Tokyo, Japan	

== See also ==
- List of male kickboxers
- List of K-1 events
- Champions of Champions Elite
