= K-1 World Grand Prix 2002 Final =

K-1 martial arts event in 2002

- Promotion: K-1
- Date: December 7, 2002
- Venue: Tokyo Dome
- City: Tokyo, Japan
- Attendance: 74,500

Event chronology
| K-1 Bassano 2002 | K-1 World Grand Prix 2002 Final | K-1 Spain MAX 2002 |

K-1 World Grand Prix 2002 Final was a kickboxing event promoted by the K-1. The event was held at the Tokyo Dome in Tokyo, Japan on Saturday, December 7, 2002 in front of 74,500 spectators. It was the tenth K-1 World Grand Prix final, involving ten of the world's top fighters (two being reservists), with all bouts fought under K-1 Rules (100 kg/156-220 lbs). The eight finalists had almost all qualified via preliminary events, while two additional fighters were invited as reserve fighters (for more detail on this see bulleted list below). In total there were ten fighters at the event, representing eight countries.

The tournament winner was Ernesto Hoost who won his fourth and final K-1 World Grand Prix by defeating Jérôme Le Banner in the final by third round knockout. Jérôme Le Banner would be making his second appearance in the final, which he so far been unable to win, and the defeat was made even worse as it left him with a broken arm which nearly ended his career.

Ernesto Hoost was knocked out of this K-1 World Grand Prix twice (taking into account the Final Elimination) - both times by Bob Sapp - but managed to proceed due to injuries to other fighters.

Qualifiers - Finalists

- Peter Aerts - Won fight at K-1 World Grand Prix 2002 Final Elimination
- Jérôme Le Banner - Won fight at K-1 World Grand Prix 2002 Final Elimination
- Ernesto Hoost - Invitee, called up to replace Semmy Schilt who was injured
- Mark Hunt - Won fight at K-1 World Grand Prix 2002 Final Elimination
- Stefan Leko - Won fight at K-1 World Grand Prix 2002 Final Elimination
- Musashi - K-1 Andy Spirits Japan GP 2002 Final winner
- Bob Sapp - Won fight at K-1 World Grand Prix 2002 Final Elimination
- Ray Sefo - Won fight at K-1 World Grand Prix 2002 Final Elimination

Qualifiers - Reservists

- Martin Holm - Invitee
- Michael McDonald - Invitee

== Tournament bracket ==
K-1 World Grand Prix 2002 Final Elimination
(New Zealand) Ray Sefo | DEC
(Sweden) Martin Holm
(Netherlands) Peter Aerts | DEC
(Brazil) Glaube Feitosa
(Netherlands) Ernesto Hoost
(United States) Bob Sapp | TKO
(Canada) Michael McDonald
(Netherlands) Semmy Schilt | DEC
(Belarus) Alexey Ignashov
(Germany) Stefan Leko | DEC
(New Zealand) Mark Hunt | DEC
(South Africa) Mike Bernardo
(France) Jérôme Le Banner | KO
(Trinidad and Tobago) Gary Goodridge
(Japan) Musashi
BYE

Quarter Finals
(New Zealand) Ray Sefo | DEC
(Netherlands) Peter Aerts
(United States) Bob Sapp | KO
(Netherlands) Ernesto Hoost *
(Germany) Stefan Leko
(New Zealand) Mark Hunt | KO
(France) Jérôme Le Banner | TKO
(Japan) Musashi

Semi Finals
(New Zealand) Ray Sefo
(Netherlands) Ernesto Hoost ** | KO
(New Zealand) Mark Hunt
(France) Jérôme Le Banner | DEC

Final
(Netherlands) Ernesto Hoost | KO
(France) Jérôme Le Banner

* Ernesto Hoost replaced Semmy Schilt in the Quarter Finals as Semmy Schilt was injured

** Ernesto Hoost replaced Bob Sapp in the Semi Finals as Bob Sapp was injured

== Results ==
K-1 World Grand Prix 2002 Final Results
K-1 Grand Prix Reserve Fight: K-1 Rules / 3Min. 3R Ext.1R
(Sweden) Martin Holm def. Michael McDonald (Canada)
Holm defeated McDonald by 3rd Round Majority Decision 2-0 (30-29, 29-29, 30-29).
K-1 Grand Prix Quarter Finals: K-1 Rules / 3Min. 3R Ext.1R
(New Zealand) Ray Sefo def. Peter Aerts (Netherlands)
Sefo defeated Aerts by 3rd Round Split Decision 2-1 (29-30, 30-28, 30-29).
(United States) Bob Sapp def. Ernesto Hoost (Netherlands)
Sapp defeated Mcdonald by TKO (Doctor Stoppage) at 2:53 of the 2nd Round but had to withdraw due to a hand injury - Ernesto Hoost would take his place in the Semi Finals.
(New Zealand) Mark Hunt def. Stefan Leko (Germany)
Hunt defeated Leko by KO (Left Hook) at 1:16 of the 3rd Round.
(France) Jérôme Le Banner def. Musashi (Japan)
Le Banner defeated Musashi by TKO (Corner Stoppage) at 0:51 of the 2nd Round.
K-1 Grand Prix Semi Finals: K-1 Rules / 3Min. 3R Ext.1R
(Netherlands) Ernesto Hoost def. Ray Sefo (New Zealand)
Hoost defeated Sefo by KO (Shin Injury) at 1:49 of the 1st Round.
(France) Jérôme Le Banner def. Mark Hunt (New Zealand)
Le Banner defeated Hunt by 3rd Round Unanimous Decision 3-0 (29-26, 29-26, 29-26) .
K-1 Grand Prix Final: K-1 Rules / 3Min. 3R Ext.2R
(Netherlands) Ernesto Hoost def. Jérôme Le Banner (France)
Hoost defeated Le Banner by KO (3 Knockdowns, Right Mid-Kicks) at 1:26 of the 3rd Round.

== See also ==
- List of K-1 events
- List of K-1 champions
- List of male kickboxers
