= Ernesto Hoost =

Dutch professional kickboxer (born 1965)

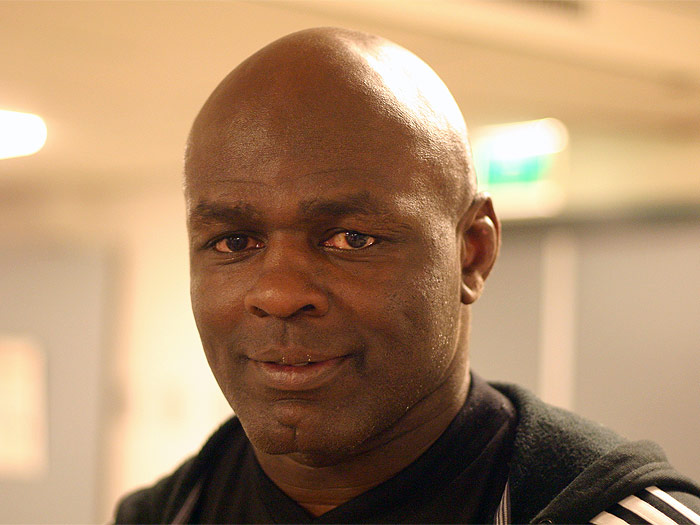
- Hoost in 2004
- Born: Ernesto Frits Hoost; 11 July 1965 (age 61); Heemskerk, Netherlands
- Other names: Mr. Perfect
- Height: 1.89 m (6 ft 2.4 in)
- Weight: 102 kg (225 lb; 16 st 1 lb)
- Division: Light heavyweight Heavyweight
- Fighting out of: Hoorn, Netherlands
- Team: Vos Gym (1987–2006); Sokudo Gym (1981–1987)
- Trainer: Johan Vos, Jan Plas (1987–2006); Ton Vriend (1981–1987)
- Years active: 1983–2006, 2014 (kickboxing)

Kickboxing record
- Total: 121
- Wins: 99
- By knockout: 62
- Losses: 21
- By knockout: 11
- Draws: 1

Other information
- Notable students: Paul Slowinski, Ashwin Balrak; Tyrone Spong, Pat Barry, Fedor Emelianenko, Ramazan Ramazanov, Joanna Jędrzejczyk
- Website: www.ernestohoost.nl

Ernesto Frits Hoost (born 11 July 1965) is a Dutch retired professional kickboxer. A four-time K-1 World Champion, Hoost is considered to be one of the greatest kickboxers of all time. Debuting in 1993 at the K-1 World Grand Prix 1993, where he came just one win short of the world title, Hoost announced his retirement thirteen years later on 2 December 2006 after the K-1 World GP Final tournament in Tokyo Dome, Japan. Hoost holds notable victories over Peter Aerts (4x), Branko Cikatić, Mirko Cro Cop (3x), Jérôme Le Banner (3x), Andy Hug (3x), Ray Sefo (3x), Musashi (2x), Mike Bernardo, Francisco Filho (2x), Sam Greco, Stefan Leko (3x), Mark Hunt, Cyril Abidi, and Glaube Feitosa.

== Biography ==
Hoost was born in Heemskerk, North Holland to Surinamese parents. He played football for amateur club Hollandia until he was 15 years old, when he started training in kickboxing at the newly opened Sokudo Gym. In 1983, he had his first match against Wim Scharrenberg, which he won by knockout in the second round. From 1988, his career accelerated, winning several European and world titles in Savate and Muay Thai. He quit his job as a sports teacher for alternative punished youngsters to focus on his career as a professional fighter.

In the K-1 Grand Prix '93, the inaugural K-1 World Grand Prix, Hoost defeated Peter Aerts by decision in the quarterfinals, knocked out Maurice Smith in the semifinals, and advanced to the tournament final where he was knocked out by Branko Cikatic. Hoost got another shot at a title on 19 December 1993, when he won the K-2 World Championship, knocking out Changpuek Kiatsongrit in four rounds. This was the only time the K-1 organisation held a K-2 tournament.

Hoost reached the K-1 World Grand Prix Finals again in 1995, but lost to Peter Aerts by a four-round decision. He went on to win every fight for the remainder of that year. In 1996, he lost at the K-1 World Grand Prix 1996 finals to Andy Hug by a five-round split decision. He finally became K-1 World Champion in 1997 when he beat Hug by a three-round unanimous decision.

Hoost was unable to defend his title at the K-1 World Grand Prix 1998 tournament, being technically knocked out in the quarterfinals by Australian Sam Greco due to being unable to start the 3rd round after a cut above his left eye; he was mostly dominated in the fight by Greco.

In 1999, Hoost won his second K-1 World Grand Prix title, beating Mirko Cro Cop by technical knockout in the third round. On 23 April 2000, Hoost avenged his loss to Greco when he beat him by a technical knockout.

Hoost retained the K-1 World Grand Prix Championship title for the third time in 2000 by defeating Ray Sefo. By then, many K-1 fans were hoping for a meeting between Hoost and Bob Sapp. Hoost returned to defend his crown in 2001 defeating Stefan Leko. However, he was forced to retire from the tournament due to an injured shin before the semi-finals.

The highly anticipated fight with Bob Sapp came at the K-1 World Grand Prix 2002 final elimination. Sapp won by technical knockout in the first round after the doctor stopped the match on cuts. Despite the loss he was again matched up with Sapp in the quarter-finals of the K-1 World Grand Prix 2002. After trading knockdowns with Sapp in the first round, Hoost lost again in a wild slugfest when referee Nobuaki Kakuda declared a KO while Hoost was still standing, but after the fight, Sapp turned out to have broken his hand and suffered four cracked ribs, and wasn't able to continue, allowing Hoost to replace him in the semi-finals. Hoost beat Ray Sefo in the first round by TKO, after Sefo damaged his shin against Hoost's kneecap. Hoost proceeded to his fifth K-1 Finals, and was matched up against Jerome Le Banner. The fight was clearly in Le Banner's favour up until the third and final round when Le Banner injured his arm blocking Hoost's kick. Hoost aggressively attacked the arm again, forcing Le Banner down with only 94 seconds left in the match, winning by TKO and his fourth Grand Prix Championship. Le Banner suffered a severe compound fracture, putting him out of competition for over a year.

In 2003, Hoost continued his feud with Bob Sapp in another arena of combat sports, professional wrestling. At AJPW's 2nd WRESTLE-1 event held in the Tokyo Dome, Hoost defeated Sapp after delivering a chair shot and slap to the back of the head which led to a schoolboy pin.

In addition to his Grand Prix titles Ernesto Hoost fought a number of Super fights. In 2004 he was again in the K-1 World Grand Prix 2004 finals, in which he lost to the eventual Grand Prix champion Remy Bonjasky.

In 2006, Hoost declared that he would fight his last tournament in K-1. In the K-1 World Grand Prix 2006, Hoost was defeated in the semi-finals by Semmy Schilt. An emotional Hoost was met with a standing ovation from the audience as he left the arena.

Hoost is well known for training "Knees of Fury" fighters Paul Slowinski (whom he is currently still training). Under his guidance Slowinski has won the K-1 tournament 2007 in Amsterdam. He has also trained in leg strikes, wrestling, and other skills with PRIDE champion Fedor Emelianenko.

Hoost was also present as a cornerman for UFC fighter Antoni Hardonk in Hardonk's UFC 85 bout with Eddie Sanchez, his UFC 92 win over Mike Wessel, and his UFC 97 loss to Cheick Kongo.

In 2012, Hoost was invited by the Katana Fighting Series to be guest of honour at their Katana 6 'Rebellion' show.

Hoost made a comeback at age 48. In his first fight in over eight years, he scored two knockdowns en route to a unanimous decision victory over Thomas Stanley at Hoost Cup: Legend in Nagoya, Japan on 23 March 2014.

He defeated Peter Aerts in their sixth meeting via unanimous decision on 19 October 2014 in Osaka to win the vacant WKO World Heavyweight Championship.

== Fighting style ==
Hoost is generally considered to be among the greatest strikers of all time. While he lacked the sheer physicality of other heavyweights, he was able to succeed through his superior speed, accuracy, devastating combinations, and tactical brilliance. His nickname "Mr. Perfect" stemmed from his ability to throw complex combinations with almost machine-like technical precision. Hoost's most feared strike was his signature low kick, which he utilized at the end of his combinations to cripple his opponent throughout the course of a match. He was able to finish top competition such as Ray Sefo, Mirko Cro Cop, and Igor Vovchanchyn through his use of the low kick. Hoost also enjoyed a strong countering game as well as having high defensive acumen. This allowed him to survive when more powerful fighters attempted to brawl, although this notably failed (twice) against the 350-pound Bob Sapp.

== Personal life ==
Hoost currently lives in the town of Hoorn, with his wife and children.

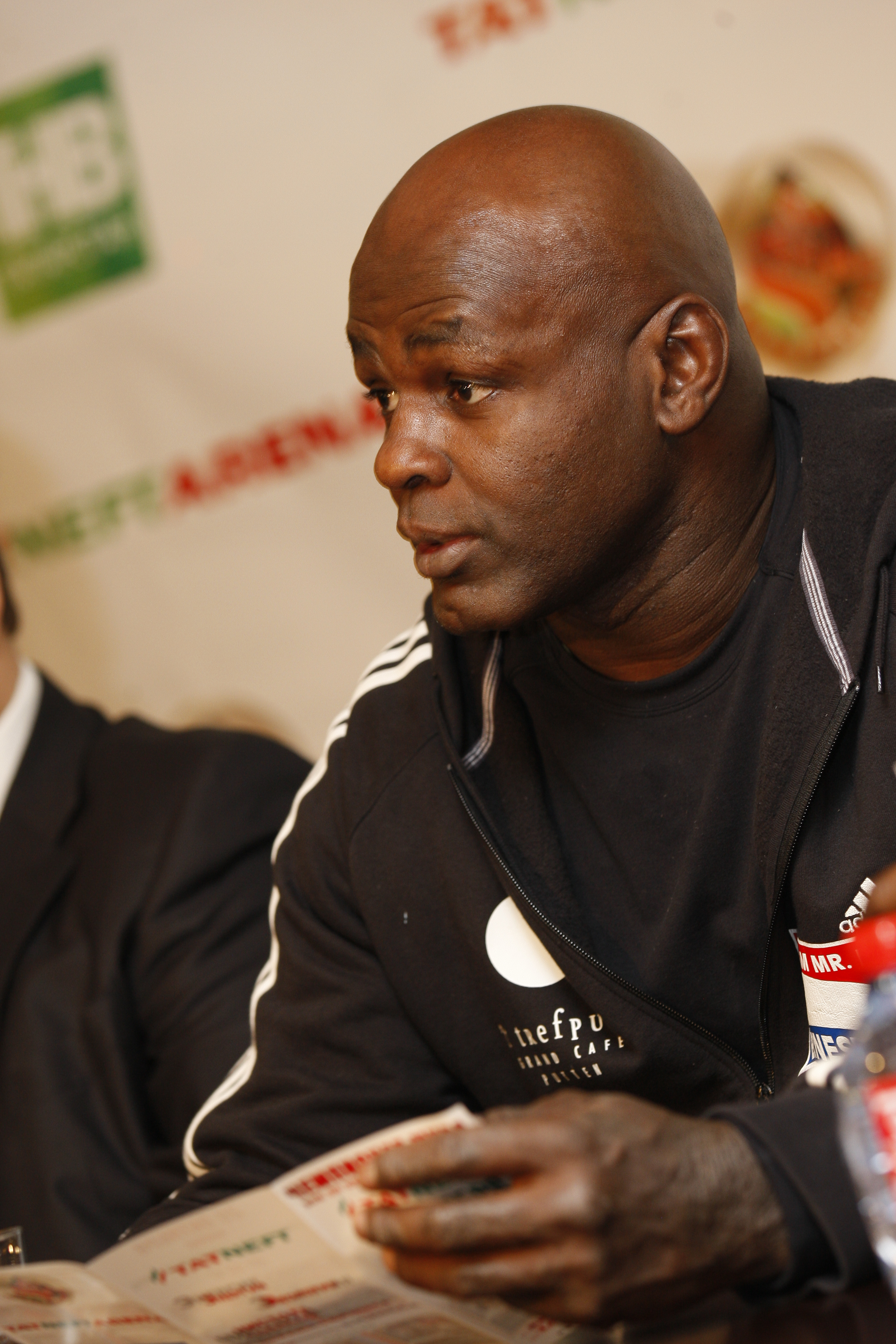

== Titles ==
- 2014 WKO World Heavyweight Champion
- 2002 K-1 World Grand Prix 2002 champion
- 2001 K-1 World Grand Prix 2001 in Melbourne champion
- 2000 K-1 World Grand Prix 2000 champion
- 2000 K-1 World Grand Prix 2000 in Nagoya runner up
- 1999 K-1 Grand Prix '99 final round champion
- 1997 K-1 Grand Prix '97 Final champion
- 1994 I.S.K.A. Full Contact Light Heavyweight World champion
- 1994 K-2 Plus Tournament 1994 champion in Amsterdam, the Netherlands
- 1993 K-2 Grand Prix '93 champion
- 1993 W.M.T.A. & W.K.A. Light Heavyweight World champion
- 1993 K-1 Grand Prix '93 runner up
- 1992 W.M.T.A. Muay Thai World Champion
- 1990 WMTA Muay Thai World Champion
- 1990 W.K.A. World Kickboxing champion
- 1989 W.M.T.A. Muay Thai World Champion
- 1989 Savate World Champion
- 1988 W.K.A. European Kickboxing champion
- 1988 Savate European champion
- 1988 I.S.K.A. European Full Contact champion
- 1988 I.S.K.A. European Muay Thai Champion
- 1987 WMTB Dutch Muay Thai Champion

=== Other ===
- Black Belt Magazine
  - 2004 Full-Contact Fighter of the Year

== Kickboxing record ==
Kickboxing record
99 wins (62 (T)KOs, 37 decisions), 21 losses, 1 draw
| Date | Result | Opponent | Event | Location | Method | Round | Time | Record |
| 2014-10-19 | Win | (Netherlands) Peter Aerts | WKO: Kumite Energy | Osaka, Japan | Decision (unanimous) | 3 | 2:00 | 99-21-1 |
Wins the WKO World Heavyweight Championship.
| 2014-03-23 | Win | (United States) Thomas Stanley | Hoost Cup: Legend | Nagoya, Japan | Decision (unanimous) | 3 | 2:00 | 98-21-1 |
| 2006-12-02 | Loss | (Netherlands) Semmy Schilt | K-1 World Grand Prix 2006 Semi-finals | Tokyo, Japan | Decision (unanimous) | 3 | 3:00 | 97-21-1 |
| 2006-12-02 | Win | (Germany) Chalid Arrab | K-1 World Grand Prix 2006 Quarter-finals | Tokyo, Japan | Ext. R decision (unanimous) | 4 | 3:00 | 97-20-1 |
| 2006-09-30 | Win | (Japan) Yusuke Fujimoto | K-1 World Grand Prix 2006 in Osaka opening round | Osaka, Japan | KO (right low kick) | 3 | 2:09 | 96-20-1 |
Qualifies for K-1 Grand Prix '06 final.
| 2006-05-13 | Win | (Netherlands) Peter Aerts | K-1 World Grand Prix 2006 in Amsterdam | Amsterdam, Netherlands | Decision (majority) | 3 | 3:00 | 95-20-1 |
| 2005-12-31 | Loss | (Netherlands) Semmy Schilt | K-1 PREMIUM 2005 Dynamite!! | Tokyo, Japan | TKO (referee stoppage) | 2 | 0:41 | 94-20-1 |
| 2004-12-04 | Loss | (Netherlands) Remy Bonjasky | K-1 World Grand Prix 2004 Quarter-finals | Tokyo, Japan | Ext. R decision | 4 | 3:00 | 94-19-1 |
| 2004-09-25 | Win | (Brazil) Glaube Feitosa | K-1 World Grand Prix 2004 final elimination | Tokyo, Japan | Decision (unanimous) | 3 | 3:00 | 94-18-1 |
Qualifies for K-1 Grand Prix '04 final.
| 2004-03-27 | Win | (Switzerland) Xhavit Bajrami | K-1 World Grand Prix 2004 in Saitama | Saitama, Japan | Decision (unanimous) | 3 | 3:00 | 93-18-1 |
| 2003-12-31 | Win | (Brazil) Montanha Silva | K-1 PREMIUM 2003 Dynamite!! | Tokyo, Japan | Decision (unanimous) | 3 | 3:00 | 92-18-1 |
| 2003-07-13 | Win | (France) Cyril Abidi | K-1 World Grand Prix 2003 in Fukuoka | Fukuoka, Japan | Decision (unanimous) | 2 | 3:00 | 91-18-1 |
| 2003-06-14 | Win | (Sweden) Martin Holm | K-1 World Grand Prix 2003 in Paris | Paris, France | Decision (unanimous) | 5 | 3:00 | 90-18-1 |
| 2003-03-30 | Win | (Brazil) Jefferson Silva | K-1 World Grand Prix 2003 in Saitama | Saitama, Japan | KO (punch) | 1 | 2:55 | 89-18-1 |
| 2002-12-07 | Win | (France) Jérôme Le Banner | K-1 World Grand Prix 2002 Final, Final | Tokyo, Japan | KO (right mid-kicks) | 3 | 1:26 | 88-18-1 |
Wins K-1 World Grand Prix 2002 title.
| 2002-12-07 | Win | (New Zealand) Ray Sefo | K-1 World Grand Prix 2002 Final, Semi-finals | Tokyo, Japan | TKO (shin injury) | 1 | 1:49 | 87-18-1 |
| 2002-12-07 | Loss | (United States) Bob Sapp | K-1 World Grand Prix 2002 Final, Quarter-finals | Tokyo, Japan | TKO (referee stoppage) | 2 | 2:53 | 86-18-1 |
Takes place in Semi-finals despite being defeated due to Bob Sapp being injured.
| 2002-10-05 | Loss | (United States) Bob Sapp | K-1 World Grand Prix 2002 final elimination | Saitama, Japan | TKO (doctor stoppage) | 1 | 3:00 | 86-17-1 |
Qualifies for K-1 Grand Prix '02 Final despite loss as a replacement for Semmy Schilt who was injured.
| 2002-08-28 | Draw | (Netherlands) Semmy Schilt | Pride Shockwave | Tokyo, Japan | Draw | 5 | 3:00 | 86-16-1 |
| 2002-08-17 | Win | (South Africa) Jan Nortje | K-1 World Grand Prix 2002 in Las Vegas | Las Vegas, Nevada | KO (kick) | 3 | 1:29 | 86-16 |
| 2002-05-22 | Win | (Germany) Stefan Leko | K-1 World Grand Prix 2002 in Paris | Paris, France | KO (punches) | 1 | 1:48 | 85-16 |
| 2002-04-21 | Win | (Japan) Tsuyoshi Nakasako | K-1 Burning 2002 | Hiroshima, Japan | KO | 1 | 1:46 | 84-16 |
| 2001-12-08 | Win | (Germany) Stefan Leko | K-1 World Grand Prix 2001 Quarter-finals | Tokyo, Japan | Decision (unanimous) | 3 | 3:00 | 83-16 |
Despite win had to withdraw from tournament due to injury.
| 2001-06-16 | Win | (England) Matt Skelton | K-1 World Grand Prix 2001 in Melbourne Final | Melbourne, Australia | Decision (majority) | 3 | 3:00 | 82-16 |
Wins K-1 World Grand Prix 2001 in Melbourne title.
| 2001-06-16 | Win | (New Zealand) Mark Hunt | K-1 World Grand Prix 2001 in Melbourne Semi-finals | Melbourne, Australia | Decision (unanimous) | 3 | 3:00 | 81-16 |
| 2001-06-16 | Win | (Belarus) Sergei Gur | K-1 World Grand Prix 2001 in Melbourne Quarter-finals | Melbourne, Australia | TKO (referee stoppage) | 1 | 2:03 | 80-16 |
| 2001-04-15 | Win | (Japan) Musashi | K-1 Burning 2001 | Kumamoto, Japan | Decision (majority) | 5 | 3:00 | 79-16 |
| 2001-03-18 | Win | (Switzerland) Xhavit Bajrami | 2H2H - Simply The Best | Amsterdam, Netherlands | Decision | 5 | 3:00 | 78-16 |
| 2000-12-10 | Win | (New Zealand) Ray Sefo | K-1 World Grand Prix 2000 Final | Tokyo, Japan | Decision (unanimous) | 3 | 3:00 | 77-16 |
Wins K-1 World Grand Prix 2000 title.
| 2000-12-10 | Win | (Brazil) Francisco Filho | K-1 World Grand Prix 2000 Semi-finals | Tokyo, Japan | Decision (unanimous) | 3 | 3:00 | 76-16 |
| 2000-12-10 | Win | (Croatia) Mirko Cro Cop | K-1 World Grand Prix 2000 Quarter-finals | Tokyo, Japan | Ext. R decision (unanimous) | 4 | 3:00 | 75-16 |
| 2000-07-30 | Loss | (France) Jérôme Le Banner | K-1 World Grand Prix 2000 in Nagoya Final | Nagoya, Japan | TKO (corner stoppage) | 1 | 3:00 | 74-16 |
Fight was for K-1 World Grand Prix 2000 in Nagoya title.
| 2000-07-30 | Win | (Netherlands) Lloyd van Dams | K-1 World Grand Prix 2000 in Nagoya Semi-finals | Nagoya, Japan | Decision (majority) | 3 | 3:00 | 74-15 |
| 2000-07-30 | Win | (Greece) Paris Vasilikos | K-1 World Grand Prix 2000 in Nagoya Quarter-finals | Nagoya, Japan | KO (right punch) | 3 | 2:20 | 73-15 |
| 2000-05-28 | Win | (France) Rani Berbachi | K-1 Survival 2000 | Sapporo, Japan | TKO (corner stoppage) | 3 | 3:00 | 72-15 |
| 2000-04-23 | Win | (Australia) Sam Greco | K-1 The Millennium | Osaka, Japan | TKO (corner stoppage) | 3 | 3:00 | 71-15 |
| 1999-12-05 | Win | (Croatia) Mirko Cro Cop | K-1 World Grand Prix 1999 Final | Tokyo, Japan | KO (left body shot) | 3 | 1:09 | 70-15 |
Wins K-1 World Grand Prix 1999 title.
| 1999-12-05 | Win | (France) Jérôme Le Banner | K-1 World Grand Prix 1999 Semi-finals | Tokyo, Japan | KO (right hook) | 2 | 0:26 | 69-15 |
| 1999-12-05 | Win | (Switzerland) Andy Hug | K-1 World Grand Prix 1999 Quarter-finals | Tokyo, Japan | Decision (unanimous) | 3 | 3:00 | 68-15 |
| 1999-10-03 | Win | (Switzerland) Xhavit Bajrami | K-1 World Grand Prix '99 opening round | Osaka, Japan | Decision (unanimous) | 5 | 3:00 | 67-15 |
Qualifies for K-1 Grand Prix '99 final.
| 1999-07-18 | Win | (Ukraine) Igor Vovchanchyn | K-1 Dream '99 | Nagoya, Japan | TKO (low kicks/3 knockdowns) | 3 | 0:51 | 66-15 |
| 1999-04-25 | Loss | (Brazil) Francisco Filho | K-1 Revenge '99 | Yokohama, Japan | KO (right hook) | 1 | 1:37 | 65-15 |
| 1998-12-13 | Loss | (Australia) Sam Greco | K-1 Grand Prix '98 Final Round Quarter-finals | Tokyo, Japan | TKO (corner stoppage) | 2 | 3:00 | 65-14 |
| 1998-09-27 | Win | (Australia) Tasis Petridis | K-1 World Grand Prix '98 opening round | Osaka, Japan | TKO (corner stoppage) | 4 | 3:00 | 65-13 |
Qualifies for K-1 Grand Prix '98 final.
| 1998-08-07 | Win | (United States) Maurice Smith | K-1 USA Grand Prix '98 | Las Vegas, Nevada | Decision (unanimous) | 5 | 3:00 | 64-13 |
| 1998-07-18 | Win | (Japan) Musashi | K-1 Dream '98 | Nagoya, Japan | TKO (referee stoppage) | 3 | 2:52 | 63-13 |
| 1998-05-24 | Win | (France) Jean Riviere | K-1 Braves '98 | Fukuoka, Japan | KO (right high kick) | 1 | 1:17 | 62-13 |
| 1998-04-09 | Loss | (Netherlands) Peter Aerts | K-1 Kings '98 | Yokohama, Japan | Decision (majority) | 5 | 3:00 | 61-13 |
| 1997-11-19 | Win | (Switzerland) Andy Hug | K-1 World Grand Prix 1997 Final | Tokyo, Japan | Decision (majority) | 3 | 3:00 | 61-12 |
Wins K-1 World Grand Prix 1997 title.
| 1997-11-19 | Win | (Brazil) Francisco Filho | K-1 World Grand Prix 1997 Semi-finals | Tokyo, Japan | Decision (majority) | 3 | 3:00 | 60-12 |
| 1997-11-19 | Win | (France) Jérôme Le Banner | K-1 World Grand Prix 1997 Quarter-finals | Tokyo, Japan | KO (right hook) | 1 | 1:15 | 59-12 |
| 1997-09-07 | Win | (Germany) Stefan Leko | K-1 Grand Prix '97 1st round | Osaka, Japan | KO (right cross) | 2 | 0:34 | 58-12 |
Qualifies for K-1 Grand Prix '97 final.
| 1997-06-07 | Win | (England) Shaun Johnson | K-1 Fight Night '97 | Zurich, Switzerland | KO (Body shot) | 1 | 1:12 | 57-12 |
| 1997-04-29 | Win | (South Africa) Mike Bernardo | K-1 Braves '97 | Fukuoka, Japan | TKO (referee stoppage/right hook) | 4 | 1:03 | 56-12 |
| 1997-03-16 | Win | (Netherlands) Duane Van Der Merwe | K-1 Kings '97 | Yokohama, Japan | KO (kick) | 3 | 1:49 | 55-12 |
| 1996-12-08 | Win | (New Zealand) Ray Sefo | K-1 Hercules '96 | Nagoya, Japan | KO (low kicks) | 4 | 0:25 | 54-12 |
| 1996-10-18 | Loss | (France) Jérôme Le Banner | K-1 Star Wars '96 | Yokohama, Japan | TKO (right hook) | 2 | 2:57 | 53-12 |
| 1996-09-01 | Win | (South Africa) Carl Bernardo | K-1 Revenge '96 | Osaka, Japan | KO | 2 | 0:20 | 53-11 |
| 1996-05-06 | Loss | (Switzerland) Andy Hug | K-1 World Grand Prix 1996 Semi-finals | Yokohama, Japan | 2nd Ext. R decision (split) | 5 | 3:00 | 52-11 |
| 1996-05-06 | Win | (Croatia) Mirko Cro Cop | K-1 World Grand Prix 1996 Quarter-finals | Yokohama, Japan | KO (right low kick) | 3 | 1:27 | 52-10 |
| 1996-03-10 | Win | (England) Stuart Green | K-1 Grand Prix '96 Opening Battle | Yokohama, Japan | KO (kick) | 2 | 0:09 | 51-10 |
Qualifies for K-1 World Grand Prix 1996.
| 1995-12-09 | Win | (United States) Maurice Travis | K-1 Hercules | Nagoya, Japan | TKO (corner stoppage) | 1 | 2:13 | 50-10 |
| 1995-09-03 | Win | (England) Michael Thompson | K-1 Revenge II | Yokohama, Japan | TKO | 2 | 2:45 | 49-10 |
| 1995-07-16 | Win | (Switzerland) Andy Hug | K-3 Grand Prix '95 | Japan | Decision (majority) | 3 | 3:00 | 48-10 |
| 1995-05-04 | Loss | (Netherlands) Peter Aerts | K-1 Grand Prix '95 Semi-finals | Tokyo, Japan | Ext. R decision (unanimous) | 4 | 3:00 | 47-10 |
| 1995-05-04 | Win | (Netherlands) John Kleijn | K-1 Grand Prix '95 Quarter-finals | Tokyo, Japan | KO (right cross) | 2 | 0:45 | 47-9 |
| 1995-03-03 | Win | (Germany) Hubert Numrich | K-1 Grand Prix '95 Opening Battle | Tokyo, Japan | KO (right cross) | 4 | 2:25 | 46-9 |
Qualifies for K-1 World Grand Prix 1995.
| 1994-12-10 | Loss | (Croatia) Branko Cikatić | K-1 Legend | Nagoya, Japan | KO (right hook) | 2 | 1:18 | 45-9 |
| 1994-11-12 | Win | (United States) Rick Roufus | Thriller in Marseille | Marseille, France | KO (right high kick) | 11 | 1:02 | 45-8 |
Wins Roufus's I.S.K.A. Full Contact Light Heavyweight World title.
| 1994-09-18 | Win | (England) Mark Russell | K-1 Revenge | Yokohama, Japan | TKO (3 knockdowns) | 2 | 2:42 | 44-8 |
| 1994-06-25 | Win | (France) Davidov | N/A | France | N/A | N/A | N/A | 43-8 |
| 1994-05-08 | Win | (Netherlands) Bob Schreiber | K-2 Plus Tournament 1994 Final | Amsterdam, Netherlands | KO | 1 | 3:00 | 42-8 |
Wins K-2 Plus Tournament 1994 title.
| 1994-05-08 | Win | (England) Mark Russell | K-2 Plus Tournament 1994 Semi-finals | Amsterdam, Netherlands | TKO (3 knockdowns) | 2 | 2:05 | 41-8 |
| 1994-05-08 | Win | (Italy) Tony Luciano | K-2 Plus Tournament 1994 Quarter-finals | Amsterdam, Netherlands | Decision | 3 | 3:00 | 40-8 |
| 1994-03-04 | Win | (Japan) Masaaki Satake | K-1 Challenge | Tokyo, Japan | KO (left high kick) | 2 | 2:45 | 39-8 |
| 1993-12-19 | Win | (Thailand) Changpuek Kiatsongrit | K-2 Grand Prix '93 Final | Tokyo, Japan | KO (right high kick) | 4 | 0:40 | 38-8 |
Wins K-2 World Grand Prix 1993 title.
| 1993-12-19 | Win | (Australia) Adam Watt | K-2 Grand Prix '93 Semi-finals | Tokyo, Japan | TKO (2 knockdowns) | 1 | 2:13 | 37-8 |
| 1993-12-19 | Win | (United States) Manson Gibson | K-2 Grand Prix '93 Quarter-finals | Tokyo, Japan | Ext. R decision (majority) | 4 | 3:00 | 36-8 |
| 1993-09-04 | Win | (Australia) Tasis Petridis | K-1 Illusion | Tokyo, Japan | TKO (3 knockdowns) | 3 | 0:45 | 35-8 |
Wins W.M.T.A. & W.K.A. World Light Heavyweight titles.
| 1993-04-30 | Loss | (Croatia) Branko Cikatić | K-1 Grand Prix '93 Final | Tokyo, Japan | KO (right hook) | 1 | 2:49 | 34-8 |
Fight was for K-1 Grand Prix '93 title.
| 1993-04-30 | Win | (United States) Maurice Smith | K-1 Grand Prix '93 Semi-finals | Tokyo, Japan | KO (left high kick) | 3 | 1:18 | 34-7 |
| 1993-04-30 | Win | (Netherlands) Peter Aerts | K-1 Grand Prix '93 Quarter-finals | Tokyo, Japan | Decision (majority) | 3 | 3:00 | 33-7 |
| 1993-02-14 | Win | (United States) Troy Hughes | N/A | N/A | N/A | N/A | N/A | 32-7 |
| 1992 | Win | (Thailand) Sanmark | N/A | N/A | KO | N/A | N/A | 31-7 |
| 1992-11-13 | Loss | (United States) Rick Roufus | N/A | New York, NY | Decision (unanimous) | 12 | 2:00 | 30-7 |
Fight was for Roufus's I.S.K.A. Full Contact Light Heavyweight World title.
| 1992-10-25 | Win | (Thailand) Theppitak Sangmoragot | Holland vs Thailand: The Revenge | Amsterdam, Netherlands | KO (left punch) | 2 | 2:14 | 30-6 |
Retains W.M.T.A. Muay Thai World title (79.8kg).
| 1992-04-26 | Win | (Canada) Joe Caktas | N/A | N/A | N/A | N/A | N/A | 29-6 |
| 1991-10-20 | Win | (Netherlands) Leo de Snoo | Hot Night in Amsterdam | Amsterdam, Netherlands | Decision | 5 | 3:00 | 28-6 |
| 1991-04-21 | Win | (Netherlands) Jan Wessels | Kickboxing "Holland vs Canada" | Amsterdam, Netherlands | Decision (unanimous) | 5 | 3:00 | 27-6 |
| 1991-02-17 | Win | (Netherlands) Luc Verheye | Holland vs Thailand VI | Netherlands | Decision (unanimous) | 5 | 3:00 | 26-6 |
| 1990-11-18 | Loss | (Netherlands) Rob Kaman | The Battle of the Year | Amsterdam, Netherlands | KO (left hook) | 5 | N/A | 25-6 |
| 1990-10-14 | Win | (Thailand) Seyoke | Holland vs Thailand V | Amsterdam, Netherlands | KO | 1 | N/A | 25-5 |
Wins W.M.T.A. Muay Thai World title (79.8kg).
| 1990-01-28 | Win | (United States) Ernest Simmons | N/A | Amsterdam, Netherlands | KO | 3 | N/A | 24-5 |
Wins W.K.A. Kickboxing World title.
| 1989-10-08 | Win | (Croatia) Branko Cikatić | N/A | Amsterdam, Netherlands | DQ | 4 | N/A | 23-5 |
Wins W.M.T.A. Muaythai World title.
| 1989-08-27 | Win | (France) Francis Dauvin | N/A | Paris, France | KO | 2 | N/A | 22-5 |
Wins Savate World title.
| 1989-05-19 | Win | (France) Pascal Ducros | N/A | N/A | N/A | N/A | N/A | 21-5 |
| 1989-04-21 | Loss | (Canada) Jean-Yves Thériault | N/A | Geneva, Switzerland | Decision (split) | 12 | 2:00 | 20-5 |
| 1989-02-19 | Win | (England) Kirkwood Walker | N/A | Amsterdam, Netherlands | Decision | 5 | 3:00 | 20-4 |
| 1988-11-20 | Win | (Netherlands) Peter Aerts | N/A | Netherlands | Decision | 5 | 3:00 | 19-4 |
| 1988-09-25 | Win | (France) Benoit Brilliant | N/A | Strasbourg, France | KO | 6 | N/A | 18-4 |
Wins W.K.A. European Kickboxing title.
| 1988-06-11 | Win | (France) Sylvain Postel | Champions in Action | Amsterdam, Netherlands | KO | 5 | N/A | 17-4 |
| 1988-06-03 | Win | (France) Regis Lessaint | N/A | Le Havre, France | KO | 3 | N/A | 16-4 |
Wins I.S.K.A. European Full Contact title.
| 1988-05-07 | Win | (Belgium) Francois Corremans | Superfights II | Arnhem, Netherlands | Decision | 5 | 3:00 | 15-4 |
Wins I.S.K.A. European Muay Thai title.
| 1988-02-27 | Win | (Netherlands) Andre Mannaart | Superfights I | Amsterdam, Netherlands | KO | 3 | N/A | 14-4 |
| 1987-12-05 | Win | (France) Latricin | N/A | N/A | N/A | N/A | N/A | 13-4 |
| 1987-11-08 | Win | (Netherlands) Kenneth Plak | N/A | Amsterdam, Netherlands | Decision | 5 | 3:00 | 12-4 |
Wins M.T.B.N. Dutch Muay Thai title.
| 1987-09-10 | Loss | (Netherlands) Ronnie Wagenmaker | N/A | N/A | KO | N/A | N/A | 11-4 |
| 1987-05-31 | Win | (France) Pascal Ducros | Kick-Thaiboxing Gala in Amsterdam | Amsterdam, Netherlands | Decision | 5 | 3:00 | 11-3 |
| 1987-02-01 | Loss | (Netherlands) Rob Kaman | W.K.A. Kickboxing | Amsterdam, Netherlands | Decision (unanimous) | 5 | 3:00 | 10-3 |
| 1986-12-14 | Loss | (Canada) Jean-Yves Thériault | N/A | Montreal, Canada | Decision (unanimous) | 12 | 2:00 | 10-2 |
| 1986-06-12 | Loss | (United States) Ernest Simmons | N/A | Florida, United States | N/A | N/A | N/A | 10-1 |
| 1986-03-02 | Win | (Netherlands) Leo de Snoo | N/A | Netherlands | N/A | N/A | N/A | 10-0 |
| 1986-01-18 | Win | (Netherlands) Roy Martina | N/A | N/A | KO | N/A | N/A | 9-0 |
| 1985-10-20 | Win | (Netherlands) Andre Mannaart | N/A | Amsterdam, Netherlands | Decision | 5 | 3:00 | 8-0 |
| 1985-06-23 | Win | (Netherlands) Rob Floris | N/A | N/A | KO | N/A | N/A | 7-0 |
| 1985-05-31 | Win | (Netherlands) Raphael Gerardy | Cente Sportif d'Etterbeek | Belgium | KO | N/A | N/A | 6-0 |
| 1985-03-10 | Win | (Netherlands) Leo de Snoo | N/A | Netherlands | N/A | N/A | N/A | 5-0 |
| 1984-11-18 | Win | (Brazil) Drielle | N/A | N/A | KO | N/A | N/A | 4-0 |
| 1984-10-20 | Win | (Netherlands) Ricardo Darsan | N/A | N/A | KO | N/A | N/A | 3-0 |
| 1984-03-25 | Win | (Netherlands) Rijntjes | N/A | Netherlands | KO | N/A | N/A | 2-0 |
| 1983-12-11 | Win | (Netherlands) Wim Scharrenberg | N/A | Netherlands | KO | 2 | N/A | 1-0 |
Legend: Win Loss Draw/no contest Notes

== See also ==
- List of K-1 events
- List of K-1 champions
- List of male kickboxers
