= K-1 Grand Prix '99 final round =

K-1 martial arts event in 1999

- Promotion: K-1
- Date: December 5, 1999
- Venue: Tokyo Dome
- City: Tokyo, Japan
- Attendance: 58,200

Event chronology
| K-1 World Grand Prix '99 opening round | K-1 Grand Prix '99 final round | K-1 Rising 2000 |

K-1 Grand Prix '99 final round was a martial arts event promoted by the K-1 organization. It was the seventh K-1 World Grand Prix final involving eight of the world's best fighters, with all bouts fought under K-1 rules. The eight finalists had all qualified via elimination fights at the K-1 World Grand Prix '99 opening round. Also on the card was a number of 'Freshman Fights' and an 'Opening Fight' fought under a mixture of Jiu-Jitsu and K-1 rules (various weight class) and two 'Super Fights' fought under K-1 rules (various weight classes). In total there were twenty fighters at the event, representing eight countries.

The tournament winner was Ernesto Hoost who defeated Mirko Cro Cop in the final by third round knockout. This victory was Hoost's second of four K-1 Grand Prix wins, while Cro Cop was making his first and penultimate K-1 Grand Prix Final appearance before winning it 14 years later. He would later branch out to a successful career in MMA in Pride. The event was held at the Tokyo Dome in Tokyo, Japan on Sunday, December 5, 1999 in front of a huge crowd of 58,200 spectators.

== K-1 Grand Prix '99 final round tournament ==
K-1 World Grand Prix '99 opening round
(New Zealand) Ray Sefo | KO
(Morocco) Samir Benazzouz
(Australia) Sam Greco | DEC
(Germany) Stefan Leko
(Japan) Masaaki Satake
(Japan) Musashi | DEC
(South Africa) Mike Bernardo
(Croatia) Mirko Cro Cop | KO
(Switzerland) Andy Hug | KO
(Japan) Hiromi Amada
(Netherlands) Ernesto Hoost | DEC
(Switzerland) Xhavit Bajrami
(Netherlands) Peter Aerts | DEC
(Netherlands) Lloyd van Dams
(France) Jérôme Le Banner | KO
(England) Matt Skelton

Quarter-finals
(New Zealand) Ray Sefo
(Australia) Sam Greco | DEC
(Japan) Musashi
(Croatia) Mirko Cro Cop | KO
(Switzerland) Andy Hug
(Netherlands) Ernesto Hoost | DEC
(Netherlands) Peter Aerts
(France) Jérôme Le Banner | KO

Semi-finals
(Australia) Sam Greco
(Croatia) Mirko Cro Cop | TKO
(Netherlands) Ernesto Hoost | KO
(France) Jérôme Le Banner

Final
(Croatia) Mirko Cro Cop
(Netherlands) Ernesto Hoost | KO

== Results ==
K-1 Grand Prix '99 final round results
Freshman fight 1: jiu-jitsu freestyle rules / 6Min. 1R
(Japan) Yoshinobu Ota def. Atsunori Hiruma (Japan)
Ota defeated Hiruma by Decision.
Freshman fight 2 (-62 kg): K-1 rules / 3Min. 3R
(Japan) Kazuki Hamasaki def. Kenichi Hamakawa (Japan)
Hamasaki defeated Hamakawa by 3rd Round Unanimous Decision 3-0 (30-28, 29-28, 30-28).
Freshman fight 3 (-71 kg): K-1 rules / 3Min. 3R
(Japan) Takahiko Shimizu draw. Toshiki Ishikawa (Japan)
Match resulted in a 3rd Round Decision Majority Draw 1-0 (30-30, 30-30, 30-29) in favour of Shimizu.
Opening fight (-71 kg): K-1 rules / 3Min. 3R
(Japan) Takashi Ohno def. Sakon Kubosaka (Japan)
Ohno defeated Kubosaka by 3rd Round Majority Decision 2-0 (30-30, 30-29, 30-29).
Super fight 1 (-59 kg): K-1 rules / 3Min. 5R
(Japan) Kensaku Maeda def. Brad Hemming (Australia)
Maeda defeated Hemming by KO (Left Kick) at 1:33 of the 1st Round.
K-1 Grand Prix quarter-finals: K-1 rules / 3Min. 3R Ext.2R
(Australia) Sam Greco def. Ray Sefo (New Zealand)
Greco defeated Sefo by 3rd Round Unanimous Decision 3-0 (29-28, 30-29, 30-27).
(Croatia) Mirko Cro Cop def. Musashi (Japan)
Cro Cop defeated Musashi by TKO (2 Knockdowns) at 1:13 of the 2nd Round.
(Netherlands) Ernesto Hoost def. Andy Hug (Switzerland)
Hoost defeated Hug by 3rd Round Unanimous Decision (30-28, 30-29, 30-28).
(France) Jérôme Le Banner def. Peter Aerts (Netherlands)
Le Banner defeated Aerts by KO (Left Hook) at 1:11 of the 1st Round.
K-1 Grand Prix semi-finals: K-1 rules / 3Min. 3R Ext.2R
(Croatia) Mirko Cro Cop def. Sam Greco (Australia)
Cro Cop defeated Greco by TKO (2 Knockdowns, Left Low Kick) at 2:50 of the 2nd Round.
(Netherlands) Ernesto Hoost def. Jérôme Le Banner (France)
Hoost defeated Le Banner by KO (Right Hook) at 0:26 of the 2nd Round.
Super Fight 2 (+95 kg): K-1 rules / 3Min. 5R
(Germany) Stefan Leko def. Harry Hooft (Netherlands)
Leko defeated Hooft by KO (Right Back Kick) at 2:37 of the 1st Round.
K-1 Grand Prix final: K-1 rules / 3Min. 3R Ext.2R
(Netherlands) Ernesto Hoost def. Mirko Cro Cop (Croatia)
Hoost defeated Cro Cop by KO (Left Body Shot) at 1:09 of the 3rd Round.

== See also ==
- List of K-1 events
- List of male kickboxers
