= Stefan Leko =

German kickboxer and mixed martial artist

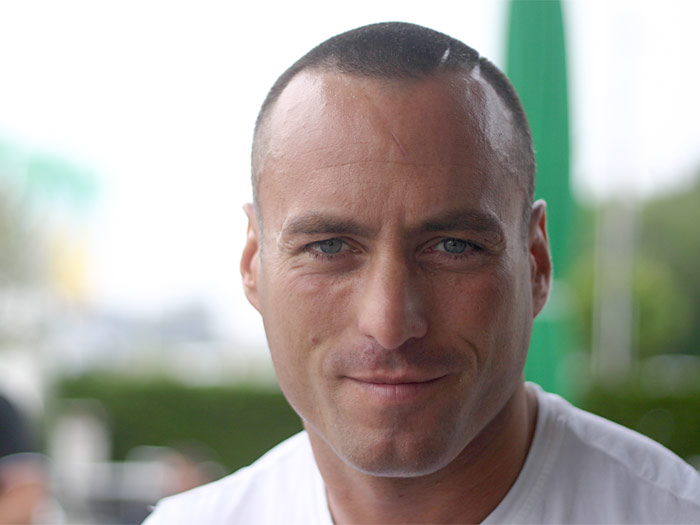
- Leko in 2009
- Born: June 3, 1974 (age 52); Germany
- Other names: Blitz
- Height: 1.87 m (6 ft 1 1/2 in)
- Weight: 100 kg (220 lb; 15 st 10 lb)
- Division: Heavyweight
- Style: MMA, Kickboxing, Muay thai, Karate
- Fighting out of: Duisburg, Germany
- Team: Golden Glory; Masters Gym; Team Leko
- Trainer: Tom Trautsch; Cor Hemmers; Klaus Waschkewitz
- Years active: 1996–present (Kickboxing); 2004–2005 (MMA)

Kickboxing record
- Total: 110
- Wins: 69
- By knockout: 38
- Losses: 39
- By knockout: 18
- Draws: 1
- No contests: 1

Mixed martial arts record
- Total: 3
- Wins: 0
- Losses: 3
- By knockout: 1
- By submission: 2

Other information
- Mixed martial arts record from Sherdog
- Last updated on: July 6, 2014

Stefan Leko (born June 3, 1974) is a German heavyweight kickboxer. He is the current WKA Super-Heavyweight world champion in kickboxing, and former Muay Thai world super-heavyweight champion and Kickboxing world super-heavyweight champion, WMTA, WKN, IKBO, IKBF, and WKA world champion, K-1 European Grand Prix 1998 champion, 1999 K-1 Dream champion and two time K-1 World Grand Prix in Las Vegas tournament champion. He fights out of Team Golden Glory in Breda, Netherlands under Cor Hemmers. Since 2011 Stefan Leko is coached and managed by Tom Trautsch and won two Heavyweight World Champion Titles.

== Biography and career ==
=== Backstory and summary ===
Stefan Leko was born in Germany but grew up in Buna, Mostar, and carries a Croatian passport. He began training karate at the age of 7. He was discovered by Klaus Waschkewitz of Masters Gym ten years later when he was 17. While being instructed by Waschkewitz, Leko won several World titles and four K-1 tournaments. His nickname "Blitz" means lightning in German. Stefan left Masters Gym in 2005 and currently belongs to the Team Golden Glory. Besides his kickboxing career Leko is also running a gym in Duisburg named Versus Gym.

He was the first person to beat Badr Hari in K-1 by first-round knockout, though it was later avenged by Hari. Leko holds notable wins over 3x K-1 World Grand Prix champion Remy Bonjasky, K-1 Heavyweight champion Badr Hari, world Muay Thai champion Mike Bernardo, 3x K-1 World Grand Prix champion Peter Aerts (x2), K-1 legend Ray Sefo, world Muay Thai champion Alexey Ignashov (x2), and K-1 Grand Prix finalist Francisco Filho.

Leko was successful in both Muay Thai/kickboxing and K-1 during the late 1990s and early 2000s, despite often conceding height and weight to some of the larger men in K-1. He won various K-1 tournaments and Muay Thai titles. His fortunes varied in the later stages of the 2000s, though he did win various more trophies and titles after his 2005 return to the kickboxing and Muay Thai world.

On 22nd of february 2020 Stefan Leko will make his appearance against Koos Wessels Boer, during 'Return of the legends' in Steenwijk (Holland).

=== Early success in K-1: European Grand Prix & Dream tournament champion ===
Leko first fought in K-1 in 1997, age 22. He won the K-1 European Grand Prix tournament in 1998, and after two losses to big names Andy Hug and Ray Sefo, he rebounded to win the K-1 Dream '99 tournament. By 2000, he had an 11–4 win–loss record in the world's premier stand-up fighting promotion, and was a 2x K-1 tournament champion.

=== Mixed fortunes in 2000–2002 - K-1 World Grand Prix USA title ===
A period of huge wins and bad losses followed. Over a three-year period, Leko would win the K-1 World Grand Prix 2001 in Las Vegas, and beat such champions as Remy Bonjasky and - stunningly - Peter Aerts, with a huge right cross that knocked the former 3x K-1 World Grand Prix champion out. In the same period, Leko also lost to Ernesto Hoost, Jorgen Kruth, Jerome LeBanner, Francisco Filho, and Mark Hunt.

The following year, Leko eradicated this inconsistency, and by the end of 2003 was considered to be in the top 5 ranked K-1 fighters.

=== Rise to the top in 2003 - exit from K-1, MMA debut with Pride ===
After a six-fight win streak in 2003 (5-0 in K-1) that included wins over multiple time K-1 champion Peter Aerts, heavyweight kickboxing champion Mike Bernardo, and K-1 World Grand Prix finalist Francisco Filho, the now top-ranked Leko was a favourite leading into the K-1 World Grand Prix 2003. With previous champion Ernesto Hoost out, Leko was considered a favourite leading in. However, he would leave K-1 prior to the finals, after contract negotiations broke down. Former Leko opponent Remy Bonjasky, whom Leko had beaten the previous year, would win the Grand Prix tournament.

Leko thus left the K-1 and kickboxing worlds, with a K-1 record of 23-11-1-1, and a total fight record of 50-12-1-1 (win/loss/draw/nc), and he decided to try his hand at another combat sport. He signed for Pride Fighting Championships, then the world's premier Mixed Martial Arts organisation. However, the striker was unable to find his place there, losing three successive fights to grapplers, and in 2005 he returned to the Muay Thai and kickboxing worlds.

=== Return to K-1 and kickboxing ===
Leko returned to the stand-up fighting world in early 2005, becoming the WKN World Super-Heavyweight champion.

Prior to his hiatus from standup fighting, he had joined Team Golden Glory, a Dutch fight camp known for such fighters as Semmy Schilt, Alistair Overeem and Sergei Kharitonov. He made his return to top level kickboxing with Golden Glory for Dutch major league promotion It's Showtime, in 2005. He was booked in a grudge match with rising star Badr Hari.

Fighting at It's Showtime in Amsterdam, Leko beat Badr Hari by spinning back kick in a grudge fight. Leko finished him in round 1, via spinning back kick to the liver. The fight had lasted little more than 100 seconds, with Badr throwing Leko across the ring from a clinch. Leko got to his feet calmly, and after a teep, landed his trademark spin-kick and it finished the fight. Hari stayed down for several minutes after the fight was waved off.

A rematch was booked in K-1, and Hari returned the favour, winning via spectacular spinning back kick, the move noted for being Leko's trademark. This marks the duology as a fairly unusual rivalry, in that both men finished the other with the same move, a spinning back kick no less.

=== Last major success in K-1, later K-1 career ===
Leko's last major success to date came when he won his second K-1 World Grand Prix in Las Vegas tournament, beating Scott Lighty, Carter Williams and then Michael McDonald in the final. He won all three fights that night by KO.

He drew old foe Remy Bonjasky in the first round of the World Grand Prix finals5, and lost on points in a controversial fight in which Leko landed two shots to Bonjasky's groin. Leko claims these shots were unintentional; however, Remy took a considerable time out period during the fight, one that Leko had been performing well in to that point, and after which, Bonjasky managed to win a points decision from.

A rubber match with Bonjasky occurred in 2007, but by now it was clear Leko was passing his physical prime, and he lost in round 1, after Bonjasky landed his trademark flying knee. Golden Glory claimed the stoppage was too quick, but nevertheless, Leko was out of another World Grand Prix - his last appearance in the final 16.

By early 2009 he was considered a fading force, despite going 4-1 the previous year, with two wins in K-1. However, he had not competed in the World Grand Prix 2008, and ended the year with a loss to Freddy Kemayo. Dropped out of almost every top 10 heavyweight rankings, Leko began to compete almost exclusively in the Netherlands and Germany, with varying results. He returned to fight for It's Showtime in May 2009, facing another smaller but popular big name heavyweight in Melvin Manhoef. On the back of two consecutive losses in K-1, Leko went into the fight as an underdog, but he ended up dominating Manhoef for two rounds, picking him apart with boxing and leg kicks. Unfortunately, in the final round he broke his foot, and the fight was called off. Manhoef magnanimously admitted that Leko had outclassed him, and offered a rematch to the Golden Glory fighter.

Despite this impressive display, Leko remained inconsistent, slipping into decline. He won his final K-1 fight to date in Sarajevo, and then lost twice in a row, in the Netherlands and Germany respectively.

=== 2010 ===
Leko strung together a three fight win streak, taking him to an overall K-1 and Muay Thai/kickboxing record of 64-22-1 win/loss/draw. After beating Volkan Duzgun on Fightingstars presents: It's Showtime 2010, Leko entered the Ultimate Glory heavyweight tournament, where he drew Wendell Roche in the quarter-finals. Halfway through round 2, Leko retired from the fight, with the reason given that he suffered "a dizzy spell", and lost his equilibrium. However, in the corner he seemed to be in considerable pain, and it emerged on Dutch fight forum mixfight.nl that Leko had a punctured lung.

In 2011, no bouts had been confirmed for Leko as of February 20, either by the fighter or Golden Glory. Mike Passenier, owner of Mike's Gym and trainer of fighters such as Badr Hari and Melvin Manhoef, stated in an interview with Daniel Fletcher on February 25, 2011 that Stefan Leko has retired.

=== Return to the ring ===
The retirement talk was officially put aside as Golden Glory confirmed that Leko would be returning to face old foe Jerome LeBanner on June 11, 2011, in Geneva. Leko was said to be serious about a return, and that the short-lived "retirement" was no longer relevant. He was even said to be intent on securing a rubber match with old foe Badr Hari, if he could string together some wins to get ranked and merit a final grudge encounter with the Moroccan.

=== WKA World title win ===
Leko won his first world title since 2005, when he beat Marinko Neimarević for the WKA World Super-Heavyweight kickboxing title by KO in round 2.

He was knocked out in round four by Nicolas Wamba at Fight Night Saint Tropez in Saint-Tropez, France on August 4, 2013.

He was scheduled to fight Dževad Poturak in Poturak's retirement fight at Final Fight Championship 7 in Sarajevo, Bosnia and Herzegovina on September 6, 2013. The fight however never materialized.

He competed in a four-man tournament at GFC Series 1 in Dubai, United Arab Emirates on May 29, 2014 and had his rubber match with Badr Hari in the semi-finals. He lost the bout by TKO after appearing lackluster and getting knocked down 3 times in the first round.

Leko suffered a twenty-one second high kick knockout loss at the hands of Zabit Samedov on the undercard of the Ruslan Chagaev vs. Fres Oquendo boxing match in Grozny, Russia on July 6, 2014.

== Failed drug test ==
=== K-1 World Grand Prix 2003 in Basel ===
On May 30, 2003, Leko failed a drug test prior to K-1 World Grand Prix 2003 in Basel. He tested positive for elevated testosterone. The test indicated Leko's testosterone level was 5 times higher before his fight against Mike Bernardo.

== Titles ==
- K-1
  - K-1 European Grand Prix 1998 champion
  - K-1 Dream 1999 champion
  - K-1 World Grand Prix in Las Vegas 2001 champion
  - K-1 World Grand Prix in Las Vegas 2006 champion
  - K-1 World Grand Prix 2001: 3rd place
- International Kick Boxing Federation
  - 1996 IKBF Full Contact World Championship
  - 1997 IKBF Kickboxing Championship
- World Muay Thai Association
  - 1997 WMTA Muay Thai World Championship
- International Kick Boxing Organisation
  - 2000 International Kick Boxing Organisation Muay Thai World Championship
- World Kickboxing Network
  - 2005 WKN Super Heavyweight Kickboxing World Championship
- World Kickboxing Association
  - 2012 WKA Super Heavyweight Muay Thai World Championship

== Kickboxing record ==
Kickboxing record (incomplete)
69 Wins (38 (T) KO's, 29 decisions), 39 Losses, 1 Draw
Date	Result	Opponent	Event	Location	Method	Round	Time
2020-02-22	Loss	(Netherlands) Koos Wessels	Battle Under the Tower	Steenwijk, Netherlands	TKO (referee stoppage)	1	N/A
For WFCA K-1 rules Super Heavyweight Veterans World Title.
2019-11-30	Loss	(Germany) Niko Lohmann	KOK World Series	Krefeld, Germany	TKO (right hook)	1	N/A
For IKBO K-1 rules Heavyweight World Title.
2016-06-18	Loss	(Switzerland) Petar Majstorović	Swiss Las Vegas Fusion 2016	Switzerland	TKO	2	N/A
2015-05-30	Loss	(Slovakia) Martin Pacas	Full Fight	Banská Bystrica, Slovakia	TKO (punches)	1	N/A
2014-07-06	Loss	(Azerbaijan) Zabit Samedov	Chagaev vs. Oquendo	Grozny, Russia	KO (left high kick)	1	0:21
2014-05-29	Loss	(Morocco) Badr Hari	GFC Fight Series 1 - Heavyweight Tournament, semi-finals	Dubai, UAE	KO (right cross)	1	1:38
2014-03-07	Loss	(Turkey) Mert Akin	AKIN Dövüş Arenası KickBoxing Event	Turkey	TKO	2	N/A
2013-08-04	Loss	(France) Nicolas Wamba	Fight Night Saint-Tropez	Saint-Tropez, France	KO (high kick)	4	N/A
2013-06-14	Loss	(Czech Republic) Ondřej Hutník	Time of Gladiator	Brno, Czech Republic	KO (round kick)	2	N/A
For King of the Ring (-95kg) World title.
2013-04-14	Loss	(Spain) Damian Garcia	K-1 MNL Mallorca	Mallorca, Spain	Decision	3	3:00
2012-03-17	Win	(Serbia) Marinko Neimarević	WKA World Championships	Kassel, Germany	KO (right hook)	2	N/A
Won WKA Super Heavyweight title in Thai Boxing class.
2011-11-23	Loss	(Japan) Makoto Uehara	RISE 85: Heavyweight Tournament 2011, quarter-finals	Tokyo, Japan	Decision (unanimous)	3	3:00
2011-11-17	Loss	(Netherlands) Errol Zimmerman	SUPERKOMBAT Fight Club, semi-finals	Oradea, Romania	TKO (referee stoppage)	1	0:58
2011-11-17	Win	(Ukraine) Tsotne Rogava	SUPERKOMBAT Fight Club, quarter-finals	Oradea, Romania	Ext. R decision (split)	4	3:00
2011-10-01	Loss	(Belgium) Sebastien van Thielen	SUPERKOMBAT World Grand Prix III 2011, semi-finals	Brăila, Romania	Ext. R decision (unanimous)	4	3:00
2011-07-16	Loss	(Romania) Cătălin Moroşanu	SUPERKOMBAT World Grand Prix II 2011	Constanța, Romania	Decision (unanimous)	3	3:00
2011-06-11	Loss	(France) Jérôme Le Banner	8ème Nuit des Sports de Combat	Geneva, Switzerland	Decision (unanimous)	5	2:00
Fight was for I.S.K.A. Kickboxing World Super Heavyweight title.
2010-11-27	Loss	(Belgium) Frédéric Sinistra	La Nuit du Kick-Boxing 2010	Liège, Belgium	TKO (doctor stoppage)	N/A	N/A
2010-10-16	Loss	(Curaçao) Wendell Roche	United Glory 12: 2010-2011 World Series Quarter-finals	Amsterdam, Netherlands	TKO (retirement)	2	1:44
2010-09-12	Win	(Turkey) Volkan Düzgün	Fightingstars presents: It's Showtime 2010	Amsterdam, Netherlands	Decision	3	3:00
2010-05-01	Win	(Russia) Nikolaj Falin	Cologne Fight Night 2010	Cologne, Germany	Decision (unanimous)	3	3:00
2010-03-20	Win	(France) Moussa Sissoko	Kickboxing Superstar XIX Edition	Milan, Italy	TKO	3	N/A
2009-11-15	Loss	(Belarus) Karl Glyschinsky	German King Cup	Germany	Decision	3	3:00
2009-10-17	Loss	(Brazil) Anderson Silva	Ultimate Glory 11: A Decade of Fights	Amsterdam, Netherlands	KO (punches)	2	N/A
2009-07-03	Win	(Bosnia and Herzegovina) Sanid Imamovic	K-1 ColliZion 2009 Sarajevo	Sarajevo, Bosnia and Herzegovina	TKO (corner stoppage)	2	3:00
2009-05-16	Loss	(Netherlands) Melvin Manhoef	It's Showtime 2009 Amsterdam	Amsterdam, Netherlands	TKO (leg injury)	3	N/A
2009-03-21	Loss	(Romania) Raul Cătinaș	K-1 ColliZion 2009 Croatia	Split, Croatia	KO (left hook)	1	2:35
2008-12-20	Loss	(France) Freddy Kemayo	K-1 Fighting Network Prague 2008	Prague, Czech Republic	Ext. R decision (unanimous)	4	3:00
2008-11-22	Win	(Poland) Daniel Sołtysiak	K-1 World Grand Prix 2008 in Riga	Riga, Latvia	Decision (unanimous)	3	3:00
2008-11-09	Win	(Netherlands) Rodney Glunder	Ultimate Glory 10 "The Battle of Arnhem"	Arnhem, Netherlands	Decision (unanimous)	3	3:00
2008-08-09	Win	(United States) Junior Sua	K-1 World Grand Prix 2008 in Hawaii	Honolulu, Hawaii	KO (knee strike)	1	2:36
2008-01-12	Win	(Cape Verde) Michel Andrade	Lord of the Ring	Belgrade, Serbia	KO (left body shot)	2	0:40
2007-10-14	Win	(Turkey) Bahadir Sari	Kickboks Gala Istanbul	Istanbul, Turkey	Decision (unanimous)	3	3:00
2007-09-27	Loss	(Netherlands) Remy Bonjasky	K-1 World GP 2007 in Seoul Final 16	Seoul, Korea	TKO (referee stoppage)	1	2:50
2007-08-11	Win	(United States) Mighty Mo	K-1 World Grand Prix 2007 in Las Vegas	Las Vegas, Nevada	Decision (unanimous)	3	3:00
2007-05-04	Win	(Romania) Cătălin Moroşanu	K-1 Fighting Network Romania 2007	Bucharest, Romania	Decision (unanimous)	3	3:00
2007-03-10	Loss	(Russia) Magomed Magomedov	K-1 Fighting Network Croatia 2007	Split, Croatia	Ext. R decision (unanimous)	4	3:00
2006-12-02	Loss	(Netherlands) Remy Bonjasky	K-1 World Grand Prix 2006	Tokyo, Japan	Decision (unanimous)	3	3:00
2006-09-30	Win	(New Zealand) Ray Sefo	K-1 World Grand Prix 2006 in Osaka opening round	Osaka, Japan	Ext. R decision (unanimous)	4	3:00
2006-08-12	Win	(Canada) Michael McDonald	K-1 World Grand Prix 2006 in Las Vegas II	Las Vegas, Nevada	TKO (referee stoppage)	2	2:28
Wins K-1 World GP 2006 in Las Vegas II tournament title.
2006-08-12	Win	(United States) Carter Williams	K-1 World Grand Prix 2006 in Las Vegas II	Las Vegas, Nevada	KO (right spinning liver kick)	1	2:40
2006-08-12	Win	(United States) Scott Lighty	K-1 World Grand Prix 2006 in Las Vegas II	Las Vegas, Nevada	TKO (referee stoppage)	3	0:58
2006-04-29	Loss	(Russia) Ruslan Karaev	K-1 World Grand Prix 2006 in Las Vegas	Las Vegas, Nevada	Decision (unanimous)	3	3:00
2005-11-19	Loss	(Morocco) Badr Hari	K-1 World Grand Prix 2005	Tokyo, Japan	KO (spinning back left high kick)	2	1:30
2005-06-12	Win	(Morocco) Badr Hari	It's Showtime 2005 Amsterdam	Amsterdam, Netherlands	KO (spinning back mid kick)	1	1:44
2005-05-14	Win	(Germany) Florian Ogunade	Local Kombat 14 "Lupta capitală"	Bucharest, Romania	TKO (referee stoppage)	3	N/A
Wins the vacant title of WKN Kickboxing World Super heavyweight (-96.6kg).
2003-12-31	Win	(Japan) Kazunari Murakami	Inoki Bom-Ba-Ye 2003	Kobe, Japan	KO (right high kick)	1	1:08
2003-10-31	Win	(Netherlands) Sebastiaan van de Muysenberg	K-1 Final Fight Stars War in Zagreb	Zagreb, Croatia	KO (punches)	2	N/A
2003-10-11	Win	(Brazil) Francisco Filho	K-1 World Grand Prix 2003 final elimination	Osaka, Japan	Decision (unanimous)	3	3:00
2003-05-30	Win	(South Africa) Mike Bernardo	K-1 World Grand Prix 2003 in Basel	Basel, Switzerland	Decision (unanimous)	5	3:00
2003-05-02	Win	(Japan) Great Kusatsu	K-1 World Grand Prix 2003 in Las Vegas	Las Vegas, Nevada, United States	TKO	2	2:24
2003-03-30	Win	(Netherlands) Peter Aerts	K-1 World Grand Prix 2003 in Saitama	Saitama, Japan	TKO (doctor stoppage)	3	1:44
2002-12-07	Loss	(New Zealand) Mark Hunt	K-1 World Grand Prix 2002 Final	Tokyo, Japan	KO (left hook)	3	1:16
2002-10-05	Win	(Belarus) Alexey Ignashov	K-1 World Grand Prix 2002 final elimination	Saitama, Japan	Ext. R decision (unanimous)	4	3:00
2002-08-17	Win	(Netherlands) Remy Bonjasky	K-1 World Grand Prix 2002 in Las Vegas	Las Vegas, Nevada	Decision (unanimous)	3	3:00
2002-05-25	Loss	(Netherlands) Ernesto Hoost	K-1 World Grand Prix 2002 in Paris	Paris, France	KO (punches)	1	1:48
2001-12-08	Loss	(New Zealand) Mark Hunt	K-1 World Grand Prix 2001 Final	Tokyo, Japan	Decision (unanimous)	3	3:00
2001-12-08	Loss	(Netherlands) Ernesto Hoost	K-1 World Grand Prix 2001 Final	Tokyo, Japan	Decision (unanimous)	3	3:00
Despite loss, Leko advances to the semifinals due to Hoost being injured.
2001-08-11	Win	(Netherlands) Peter Aerts	K-1 World Grand Prix 2001 in Las Vegas	Las Vegas, Nevada	KO (right cross)	3	2:05
Wins K-1 World GP 2001 in Las Vegas tournament title.
2001-08-11	Win	(Belarus) Sergei Ivanovich	K-1 World Grand Prix 2001 in Las Vegas	Las Vegas, Nevada	TKO (corner stoppage)	3	3:00
2001-08-11	Win	(United States) Jeff Roufus	K-1 World Grand Prix 2001 in Las Vegas	Las Vegas, Nevada	TKO	2	2:34
2001-06-24	Loss	(France) Jérôme Le Banner	K-1 Survival 2001	Sendai, Japan	Decision (unanimous)	5	3:00
2001-05-20	NC	(Belgium) Marc de Wit	K-1 Germany Grand Prix 2001	Oberhausen, Germany	NC (de Wit suffers leg injury)	1	N/A
2001-03-17	Loss	(Sweden) Jörgen Kruth	K-1 Gladiators 2001	Yokohama, Japan	KO (right hook)	2	2:19
2001-02-04	Win	(Belarus) Alexey Ignashov	K-1 Holland GP 2001 in Arnhem	Arnhem, Netherlands	DQ	5	3:00
2000-12-10	Loss	(Brazil) Francisco Filho	K-1 World Grand Prix 2000	Tokyo, Japan	Ext. R decision (unanimous)	4	3:00
2000-10-09	Win	(South Africa) Andrew Thomson	K-1 World Grand Prix 2000 in Fukuoka	Fukuoka, Japan	KO (right low kick)	2	1:50
2000-09-03	Win	(Belarus) Andrei Zuravkov	Battle of Arnhem II	Arnhem, Netherlands	KO	2	N/A
Wins IKBO Muaythai world title.
2000-06-03	Win	(England) Ricky Nicholson	K-1 Fight Night 2000	Zurich, Switzerland	Decision (unanimous)	5	3:00
2000-04-23	Win	(Albania) Xhavit Bajrami	K-1 The Millennium	Osaka, Japan	Decision (majority)	3	3:00
1999-12-05	Win	(Netherlands) Harry Hooft	K-1 World Grand Prix 1999	Tokyo, Japan	KO (right back kick)	1	2:37
1999-10-05	Loss	(Australia) Sam Greco	K-1 World Grand Prix '99 opening round	Osaka, Japan	Decision (majority)	3	2:35
Fails to qualify for K-1 Grand Prix '99 final.
1999-07-18	Win	(Morocco) Samir Benazzouz	K-1 Dream '99 Final	Nagoya, Japan	KO (right low kick)	1	2:45
Wins K-1 Dream 1999 tournament title.
1999-07-18	Win	(France) Cyril Abidi	K-1 Dream '99 semi-finals	Nagoya, Japan	Decision (unanimous)	3	3:00
1999-07-18	Win	(France) Philippe Gomis	K-1 Dream '99 quarter-finals	Nagoya, Japan	KO (right cross)	1	2:56
1999-06-05	Loss	(Switzerland) Andy Hug	K-1 Fight Night '99	Zurich, Switzerland	Decision (unanimous)	5	3:00
Fight was for Andy's W.K.A. World Muay Thai Super Heavyweight title.
1998-09-27	Loss	(New Zealand) Ray Sefo	K-1 World Grand Prix '98 opening round	Osaka, Japan	Decision (unanimous)	5	3:00
Fails to qualify for K-1 Grand Prix '98 final.
1998-07-18	Win	(Denmark) Nicholas Pettas	K-1 Dream '98	Nagoya, Japan	KO (punch)	2	1:09
1998-06-06	Win	(Netherlands) Rob Van Esdonk	K-1 Fight Night '98 Final	Zurich, Switzerland	KO (punch)	3	1:57
Wins K-1 Fight Night 1998 tournament title.
1998-06-06	Win	(England) Ray Hoffman	K-1 Fight Night '98 semi-finals	Zurich, Switzerland	KO (punch)	2	2:07
1998-06-06	Win	(Croatia) Petar Majstorovic	K-1 Fight Night '98 quarter-finals	Zurich, Switzerland	Ext. R decision (unanimous)	4	3:00
1998-03-08	Win	(Turkey) Cengiz Koc	Night of the Masters	Duisburg, Germany	TKO (corner stoppage)	4	3:00
1997-09-07	Loss	(Netherlands) Ernesto Hoost	K-1 Grand Prix '97 1st round	Osaka, Japan	KO (right cross)	2	0:34
Fails to qualify for K-1 Grand Prix '97 final.
1997-04-29	Win	(Thailand) Sadau Kiatsongrit	K-1 Braves '97	Fukuoka, Japan	Decision (unanimous)	5	3:00
1996-03-16	Loss	(Netherlands) Jan Lomulder	Thai/Kickboxing Nijmegen	Nijmegen, Netherlands	Decision	5	3:00
Legend: Win Loss Draw/No contest Notes

== Mixed martial arts record ==
Professional record breakdown
3 matches	0 wins	3 losses
By knockout	0	1
By submission	0	2

Res.	Record	Opponent	Method	Event	Date	Round	Time	Location	Notes
Loss	0–3	Kazuhiro Nakamura	Pride 29	TKO (punches)	February 20, 2005	1	0:54	Saitama, Japan	
Loss	0–2	Ikuhisa Minowa	Pride Shockwave 2004	Submission (heel hook)	December 31, 2004	1	0:27	Saitama, Japan	
Loss	0–1	Naoya Ogawa	Pride Total Elimination 2004	Submission (arm-triangle choke)	April 25, 2004	1	1:34	Saitama, Japan	

== See also ==
- List of K-1 events
- List of K-1 champions
- List of male kickboxers
