= Simon Dore =

Kickboxer from England (born 1969)

- Born: 30 July 1969 (age 57)
- Nationality: English
- Height: 6 ft 0 in (183 cm)
- Division: Super-cruiserweight; Heavyweight; Super-heavyweight
- Style: Kickboxing
- Fighting out of: Leicester, England
- Last updated on: 8 April 2020

Simon Dore (born 30 July 1969) is a retired professional kickboxer from Leicester, England. He was a former WKN world heavyweight kickboxing champion who fought most of his career under 'full-contact' rules but would also compete under 'free-style' (low kicks) rules and fought twice in K-1.

== Biography/Career ==
Simon Dore began his career fighting under full-contact rules eventually winning the World Association of Kickboxing Organizations (WAKO) pro Commonwealth super-cruiserweight title. On 20 June 1998, Dore upset Brazilian ISKA world champion Eduardo Canuto by split decision in Bangor, Northern Ireland. On 6 February 1999, Dore lost to South African Sheldon Schutzler by decision in a freestyle bout held in Belfast, Northern Ireland. This was Dore's first bout under low kick rules. Shortly afterwards Dore captured the WKN world heavyweight title under low kick rules on 28 April 1999 in a re-match against Eduardo Canuto in Alagoas, Brazil.

On 6 June 1999, Simon Dore fought Hiromi Amada at K-1: Survival '99 in Sapporo, Japan, losing by TKO at 1:55 of round 3. Then on 31 October 1999 in Leicester, England, Simon Dore re-matched Sheldon Schutzler who was now the WKN Intercontinental heavyweight Thai boxing champion. Dore won the bout by unanimous decision after 5 rounds. Dore had his second K-1 bout on 16 April 2000 at K-1: UK Battle of Britain 2000 in Birmingham, England against UK MMA pioneer Lee Hasdell. Dore lost by KO at 0:30 of round 3.

Ranked No.1 in the world, Dore travelled to Lake Grove, New York on 16 November 2001 to take on the USKBA world super-heavyweight full-contact champion Derek Panza (17-1). This was also for the vacant ISKA world super-heavyweight full-contact title. Dore took Panza the full 12 rounds, losing by decision. Dore had a shot at the WAKO pro world heavyweight full-contact title when he fought Aziz Katou in Leicester, losing by 8th-round KO.

== Kickboxing titles ==
- WKA British cruiserweight full contact champion
- WAKO pro Commonwealth super-cruiserweight full-contact champion
- WKN world heavyweight kickboxing (low kicks) champion

== Kickboxing record (incomplete) ==
Kickboxing record
? wins (? (T)KOs), ? losses, ? draws
Date	Result	Opponent	Event	Location	Method	Round	Time
26-10-2003	Win	(England) Cipher Shagaam	Fight Night @ Starlite	Leicester, England	Decision		
25-06-2003	Win	(England) Chris Ballard	Extreme Brawl 3	Bracknell, England	DQ	1	
11-05-2003	Win	(England) Rob Gledgehill		Leicester, England			
03-11-2002	Loss	(Belgium) Aziz Khatou	Kickboxing Heavyweight Explosion	Leicester, England	KO (head kick)	8	
For the WAKO pro world heavyweight full-contact title.
05-10-2002	Win	(England) Roger Toone		Guildford, England	Decision		
16-11-2001	Loss	(United States) Derek Panza	Top Kick Championship Kickboxing	Lake Grove, New York, United States	Decision	12	2:00
For the USKBA & ISKA world super-heavyweight full-contact titles.
23-09-2000	Loss	(Australia) Stan Longinidis	Greek Fight Night	Kozani, Greece	KO	1	
16-04-2000	Loss	(England) Lee Hasdell	K-1: UK Battle of Britain 2000	Birmingham, England	KO (flying knee)	3	0:30
31-10-1999	Win	(South Africa) Sheldon Schutzler	Fright Night	Leicester, England	Decision	5	2:00
06-06-1999	Loss	(Japan) Hiromi Amada	K-1: Survival '99	Sapporo, Japan	TKO	3	1:55
28-04-1999	Win	(Brazil) Eduardo Canuto	IVC 10	Alagoas, Brazil			
Won WKN world heavyweight kickboxing (low kicks) title.
06-02-1999	Loss	(South Africa) Sheldon Schutzler	Championship Kickboxing	Belfast, Northern Ireland	Decision	5	2:00
20-06-1998	Win	(Brazil) Eduardo Canuto	Kickboxing Mania II	Bangor, Northern Ireland	Split decision	5	2:00
00-00-0000	Win	(England) Mack McNulty		Birmingham, England	KO		
11-05-1997	Loss	(England) Waine Turner		Dudley, England	Decision	7	2:00
For the WAKO pro British super-cruiserweight full contact title.
00-04-1997	Win	(England) Derek Parsons	WKA World War	Worcester, England	TKO	3	
Retained WKA British Cruiserweight full-contact title.
Legend: Win Loss Draw/no contest Notes

== See also ==
- List of K-1 events
- List of male kickboxers
