= Dennis Alexio vs. Branko Cikatić =

- Date: March 16, 1992
- Venue: Thomas & Mack Center in Las Vegas, Nevada, US
- Title(s) on the line: Vacant WMAC Heavyweight Championship

Tale of the tape
Boxer	(United States) Dennis Alexio	(Croatia) Branko Cikatić
Nickname	"The Terminator"	"The Croatian Tiger"
Hometown	Honolulu, Hawaii, US	Split, Croatia
Pre-fight record	50–1	N/A
Height	5 ft 11 in (1.80 m)	6 ft 1 in (1.85 m)
Weight	203 lb (92 kg)	197 lb (89 kg)
Style	Kickboxing	Muay Thai, Kickboxing
Recognition	ISKA/KICK World Heavyweight Champion	WKA/IKBF World Cruiserweight Champion

Result
- Was called a technical draw at 1:25 of round 3 after the bout was stopped as Alexio hit Cikatić during a stoppage.

Dennis Alexio vs. Branko Cikatić was a heavyweight kickboxing bout that took place at the Thomas & Mack Center in Las Vegas, Nevada, US, on March 16, 1992, which ended in a controversial technical draw.

== Background ==
Dennis Alexio was the golden boy of American kickboxing, having lost only one bout in his career (a controversial decision to Don "The Dragon" Wilson at light heavyweight in 1984) and co-starred in the film Kickboxer with Jean-Claude Van Damme. The undisputed World Heavyweight Kickboxing Champion, he held titles for all the major kickboxing associations such as PKA, IKF, ISKA, KICK and WKA.

Branko Cikatić, meanwhile, had spent the majority of his career fighting in Muay Thai matches as a cruiserweight throughout Europe. After a storied amateur career, he became the European Muay Thai Champion in 1985 before going on to take the world title two years later. In 1989, he won the WKA Cruiserweight Kickboxing Championship and then the IKBF Cruiserweight Kickboxing Championship the following year.

== The fight ==
Alexio faced Cikatić on March 16, 1992, at the Thomas & Mack Center in Las Vegas, US, live on pay-per-view as part of the World Martial Arts Challenge event. The only title on the line was the inaugural WMAC Heavyweight Championship. 14,000 spectators were in attendance at the venue.

The rules of the bout were disputed between both fighters right up to the day of the fight. Alexio, who had competed exclusively under American kickboxing rules, wanted both fighters to wear foot pads and low kicks to be illegal. Cikatić, a Muay Thai fighter, wanted low kicks as well as the Thai clinch to be allowed. In the end, low kicks were allowed and Alexio wore foot pads, and knees and the clinch were banned. The duration of the fight was set at eight, three-minute rounds.

The first two rounds were close, with Alexio utilising better boxing skills but Cikatić using his powerful low kicks to his advantage. Cikatić was docked a point in the second round for kneeing Alexio in the clinch. The fight then ended in confusion in the third round when a stoppage was called as Alexio's right foot pad came off. Referee Pat Burleson decided to continue the fight without retrieving the foot pad as it had fallen out of the ring. However, before the fight was restarted Alexio hit Cikatić with two left hooks and then kicked at him but missed as he fell to the canvas.

The fight was stopped there and, as it had gone less than half of the set eight rounds, was ruled a technical draw.

== Aftermath ==
The fight was considered to be a disappointment due to the nature that it ended in. The rules and the referee, Pat Burleson, were also criticized. Cikatić claimed the decision to rule the fight a draw was biased as he was the foreign fighter, stating that due to the nature of the stoppage, Alexio should have lost via disqualification. As the WMAC Heavyweight title was won by neither man, Dennis Alexio was set to face Maurice Smith, who had defeated Steven Kruwell that night in a contender match, for it. Despite talks, Smith and Alexio would never meet in the ring.

In his next bout, Alexio faced Stan Longinidis under a similar rule-set in Australia and had his leg broken by a low kick from Longinidis. Although he recovered and went on to fight many more times afterwards, the loss virtually removed Alexio from contention as the world's best heavyweight kickboxer. Branko Cikatić, on the other hand, went on to win the first K-1 World Grand Prix in December 1993. By defeating Changpuek Kiatsongrit, Masaaki Satake and Ernesto Hoost in the same night, he went down in history as one of the sport's greatest fighters.
