= Darrell Henegan =

Canadian taekwondo practitioner and kickboxer

- Born: June 27, 1961 (age 65); Queens, New York, U.S.
- Nationality: Canadian
- Height: 1.88 m (6 ft 2 in)
- Weight: 90.7 kg (200 lb; 14.28 st)
- Division: Cruiserweight; Heavyweight
- Style: Kickboxing • Taekwondo
- Stance: Orthodox
- Fighting out of: Montreal, Quebec, Canada
- Trainer: Ray Nikiel
- Rank: Black belt in Taekwondo
- Years active: 1979–2001 (Taekwondo); 1984–1996 (Kickboxing); 1986 (Boxing)

Professional boxing record
- Total: 1
- Wins: 1
- By knockout: 0
- Losses: 0
- Draws: 0

Kickboxing record
- Total: 27
- Wins: 25
- By knockout: 20
- Losses: 2
- Draws: 0

Darrell Henegan (born June 27, 1961) is an American-born Canadian former taekwondo practitioner and kickboxer.

== Taekwondo ==
Henegan's taekwondo career spanned the years 1979–2001. During that time he won numerous awards in four different decades. They included Canadian, Pan American, and North American Championships, as well as winning the 1981 World Taekwondo Games in Santa Clara, California. At that event he became the first North American to beat the Koreans in a World Championship Gold Medal match.

== Kickboxing ==
Darrell competed as a professional kickboxer from 1984 to 1996. He finished with a record of 25 wins and 2 losses, with 20 wins by KO. He held numerous titles and was a two-time world champion. In 1988 he won the FFKA Heavyweight Title by decisioning Jerry Rhome and in 1993 he won the ISKA Cruiserweight Championship with a win over Przemyslaw Saletta. One of Henegan's losses was in a 1990 unification bout with KICK/ISKA Heavyweight Champion Dennis Alexio. He also had one bout as a professional boxer, a four-round unanimous decision over Daniel DesRoches in 1986.

== Kickboxing record ==
Kickboxing record
25 wins (20 KOs), 2 losses, 0 draws
Date	Result	Opponent	Event	Location	Method	Round	Time	Record
1993-00-00	Win	(Poland) Przemysław Saleta						
Wins the ISKA World Cruiserweight (–88.2 kg/194 lb) Championship.
1991-00-00	Win	(United States) Neil Singleton						
Retains the FFKA World Championship.
1990-08-06	Loss	(United States) Dennis Alexio	Harrah's Lake Tahoe	Stateline, Nevada, USA	TKO (punches)	5	1:54	17–2
Challenges for the ISKA World Heavyweight (–96.4 kg/212 lb) Full Contact Championship and the KICK World Heavyweight Full Contact Championship, and loses the FFKA World Heavyweight Full Contact Championship.
1989-00-00	Win	(United States) Larry Cureton						
Retains the FFKA World Championship.
Legend: Win Loss Draw/No contest Notes
