= Dennis Alexio vs. Stan Longinidis =

- Date: 6 December 1992
- Venue: Melbourne SEC in Melbourne, Australia
- Title on the line: ISKA Oriental Rules World Heavyweight Championship

Tale of the tape
Boxer	(United States) Dennis Alexio	(Australia) Stan Longinidis
Nickname	"The Terminator"	"The Man"
Hometown	Honolulu, Hawaii, USA	Melbourne, Australia
Pre-fight record	54-1-1	27-1-1
Height	5 ft 11 in (1.80 m)	5 ft 10 in (1.78 m)
Weight	202 lb (92 kg)	209 lb (95 kg)
Style	Kickboxing	Kickboxing
Recognition	ISKA/KICK World Heavyweight Champion	KICK World Super Heavyweight Champion; WKA World Junior Heavyweight Champion

Result
- Longinidis defeated Alexio via KO (right low kick) at 0:15 of round 1.

Dennis Alexio vs. Stan Longinidis was a heavyweight kickboxing bout that took place at the Melbourne Sports and Entertainment Centre in Melbourne, Australia on 6 December 1992. As one of the most highly anticipated fights in the sport's history, it ended in an anticlimax when Longinidis broke Alexio's leg with a low kick within ten seconds of the first round.

== Background ==
Dennis Alexio was the golden boy of American kickboxing, having lost only one bout in his career (a decision to Don "The Dragon" Wilson at light heavyweight in 1984) and co-starred in the film Kickboxer with Jean-Claude Van Damme. The undisputed world heavyweight kickboxing champion, he held titles for many major associations, including the PKA, ISKA, and KICK.

Stan Longinidis was the first Australian to win a world kickboxing title when he took the KICK full contact Super Heavyweight Championship in 1991, and also held the WKA World Junior Heavyweight Championship.

Both men shared a common opponent in future K-1 World Grand Prix winner Branko Cikatić, who had fought the pair earlier that year. Longinidis had defeated Cikatić while Alexio's bout with him ended in a controversial draw.

== The fight ==
The bout took place on 6 December 1992 at the Melbourne Sports and Entertainment Centre in Melbourne, Australia in front of 8,000 spectators, with the fight set for ten three-minute rounds. Oriental rules were observed, allowing for low kicks, knees and limited clinch-fighting.

Six seconds into the fight, Longinidis hit Alexio with a left low kick, causing Alexio's fibula and tibia to break. Officially, the fight lasted just fifteen seconds and Longinidis was named the winner via technical knockout.

== Aftermath ==
As the bout was the most eagerly anticipated kickboxing super fight at the time and a huge media event, it was considered a disappointment and an anticlimax. Michael Schiavello called it "the greatest anti-climax in ring sport history." The bout was listed in the Guinness World Records as the "fastest KO in kickboxing world title match."

Alexio and his manager, Bob Wall, disputed the ruling and claimed that Alexio's fracture was caused by twisting his leg on a depression in the ring floor. Although Dennis' manager Bob Wall did initially comment after the fight, that Stan clearly won with an excellent legal kick. The match was consequently reviewed by its two sanctioning bodies, the ISKA and the WKA. The outcome of the review was divided: the United States division of the ISKA overturned the ruling to a no contest, while the WKA and Australian division of the ISKA upheld the original decision.

A rematch between Longinidis and Alexio was discussed but never took place.

The match marked the end of both fighters' heyday. Although Alexio recovered from the broken leg and went on to compete many more times afterwards, the match effectively removed him from consideration as one of the best fighters in the world. Longinidis likewise fought for many years to come, becoming a regular competitor in K-1 but failing to win any of the company's tournaments.
