= Chris Ballard =

Chris Ballard may refer to:

- Chris Ballard (American football) (born 1969), American football executive
- Chris Ballard (journalist) (born 1973), American sports writer for Sports Illustrated
- Chris Ballard (politician), Canadian politician
- Chris Ballard (kickboxer) (1971–2003), English kickboxer and mixed martial artist
