= Mike Bernardo =

South African kickboxer (1969–2012)

- Born: Michael Shawn Barnardo; 28 July 1969; Fishhoek, Cape Town, South Africa
- Died: 14 February 2012 (aged 42); Muizenberg, Cape Town, South Africa
- Other names: Beru-chan
- Nationality: South African
- Height: 1.93 m (6 ft 4 in)
- Weight: 110 kg (243 lb; 17 st 5 lb)
- Division: Heavyweight
- Style: Boxing, kickboxing, Kyokushin
- Stance: Orthodox
- Fighting out of: Wynberg, South Africa
- Team: Steve's Gym
- Trainer: Steve Kalakoda
- Years active: 1990–2004

Professional boxing record
- Total: 13
- Wins: 11
- By knockout: 9
- Losses: 1
- By knockout: 1
- Draws: 1

Kickboxing record
- Total: 77
- Wins: 54
- By knockout: 42
- Losses: 18
- By knockout: 12
- Draws: 3
- No contests: 2

Other information
- Boxing record from BoxRec
- Mixed martial arts record from Sherdog

Michael Shawn Bernardo (28 July 1969 – 14 February 2012) was a South African kickboxer and boxer from Cape Town. He was known as Beru-chan in Japan, where he took part in K-1 World GPs starting in 1994. He held notable wins over Mirko Cro Cop, Andy Hug (2×), Francisco Filho, Branko Cikatic, Stan Longinidis, Gary Goodridge, and three consecutive wins over K-1 legend Peter Aerts.

== Biography ==
Mike Bernardo was of Italian and English heritage and was born in Fishhoek near Cape Town on 28 July 1969. His surname was actually Barnardo, but most people knew him as Bernardo. When he was younger, bullies often picked on him and beat him up. Bernardo started with Kyokushin to deal with his bullies: "I started Karate when I was, 12, 13 years old. The reason why I started was, because as a youngster I was quite tall but not strong. A lot of children at school were in gangs and they would always pick on me and beat me up because I was a big guy so they could prove their friends they were stronger. I took up martial arts lessons and went back to school and when they started to pick on me again and try to beat me up, I beat them all up."

Being a keen all-round sportsman, Bernardo tried to do as many sports as he could. Besides karate, he started surfing when he was six, played numerous other sports but the one that he liked to play the most was rugby. After he kept getting sent off for fighting, Bernardo knew he had to make the transition from rugby to fighting sports.

=== Kickboxing career ===
It was under the guidance of former boxing champion Steve Kalakoda that Bernardo received his kickboxing training. He met Kalakoda during his compulsory military service where the latter worked as a physical training instructor in the navy. Bernardo quickly established a fearsome reputation as a heavy-hitting knockout fighter. After fights in South Africa, Italy and Russia Bernardo got invited through one of England's promoters to fight in K-1. He made his debut in the K-1 World Grand Prix 1995 against Andy Hug. Bernardo pulled off the shocking win via third round stoppage.

One of his biggest successes came early in his career. In 1996, just one year into his K-1 run, Bernardo competed in the K-1 World Grand Prix for the second time. Bernardo faced a tough task as he would meet Peter Aerts in the first round of the tournament. Just as he did against Hug one year before, Bernardo scored a big upset with a huge right cross that knocked the former K-1 World Grand Prix champion out. Bernardo made it to the finals that year, ultimately losing to Andy Hug in a great fight. Bernardo's other major success took place in 2000 when he won the K-1 World Grand Prix in Fukuoka, beating Jörgen Kruth, Andrew Thompson and then Mirko Cro Cop in the final. He won all three fights that night by KO.

Though he never did win the K-1 World Grand Prix crown, Bernardo proved he could hang with the very best fighters. In his career he faced all of the K-1's best - including Jerome Le Banner, Andy Hug, Peter Aerts, Ernesto Hoost and Francisco Filho - and at some point in their career, nearly all of them found themselves on the receiving end of a KO. On New Year's Eve of 2004, Bernardo was going to face Nigerian fighter Bobby Ologun in "K1-Dynamite!", but couldn't take part in the event due to a neck injury and retired from K-1.

=== Boxing career ===
In addition to his K-1 career, Bernardo made his professional boxing debut on 28 February 1993, against Delius Musemwa. Bernardo knocked out Delius in the third round. In the second bout he lost by TKO for the first round against little lighter opponent Anton Nel on 7 April 1993. After a string of victories he won the vacant WBF title against Dan Jerling by defeating the Czechoslovak fighter in the sixth round by KO. The bout took place in May 2000. In 2001, on 8 June, Bernardo defended his WBF title against Peter McNeeley in Cape Town and knocked McNeely out in just 41 seconds. In May 2002, due to being inactive for long, Bernardo was stripped of the belt. Most of bouts (8) were held in South Africa, twice he fight in USA, once in Hungary, Mexico and Japan.

=== Marriage ===
Bernardo was married to singer Beshara Ornellas. They were married on 5 April 1999 and the marriage lasted only 10 months; Ornellas left on 14 February 2000.

=== Religion ===
Bernardo was a deeply religious man. His belief in God played an important role in his fighting career and life: "Before the fight I say a prayer that God keep us both safe. And his will be done. In my heart there's no vengeance, I don't wanna inflict pain just because I want to inflict pain, but because I want to compete against the person that I am competing with. We're both competitors in the same line of work and we're just putting our skills together to see who's better than the other one on the day. My message is that there is hope for all of us, there's hope for every single one. Jesus is the saviour, and he's the way to offer hope, love, and also hope in healing as well. And with him with us we can achieve anything we want to achieve. That is my message."

=== Death ===
Bernardo died on February 14, 2012, at the age of 42. According to News24, his cause of death was unknown. He is survived by his long-term partner Claire Oschmann and their two children, Kai Oschmann-Barnardo and Sascha Oschmann-Barnardo.

== Titles and accomplishments ==
- Professional kickboxing
  - World Olympic Kickboxing Super Heavyweight winner
  - 2004 World Kickboxing Association Muay Thai Super Heavyweight World champion
  - 1998 W.A.K.O. Pro Muay Thai Super Heavyweight World champion
  - 1996 World Kickboxing Association Muay Thai Super Heavyweight World champion
- K-1
  - 2001 K-1 World Grand Prix in Nagoya 3rd place
  - 2000 K-1 World Grand Prix in Fukuoka winner
  - 1998 K-1 World Grand Prix 3rd place
  - 1996 K-1 World Grand Prix runner up
  - 1995 K-1 World Grand Prix 3rd place
- Professional boxing
  - W.B.F. World Heavyweight champion

== Kickboxing record ==
Kickboxing record (incomplete)
54 wins (42 (T)KOs, 12 decisions), 18 losses (12 (T)KO's), 3 draws, 2 no contests
| Date | Result | Opponent | Event | Location | Method | Round | Time |
| 2004-11-06 | Draw | (Thailand) Kaoklai Kaennorsing | Titans 1st | Kitakyushu, Japan | Draw | 3 | 3:00 |
| 2004-09-18 | Win | (Switzerland) Petar Majstorovic | K-1 W.K.A. Championships | Basel, Switzerland | Decision | 5 | 3:00 |
Wins vacant title of W.K.A. Muay Thai World Super Heavyweight (+95kg/+210lbs) title.
| 2004-06-26 | Loss | (Japan) Tatsufumi Tomihira | K-1 Beast 2004 in Shizuoka quarter-finals | Shizuoka, Japan | KO | 1 | 1:09 |
| 2004-03-27 | Loss | (South Africa) Jan Nortje | K-1 World Grand Prix 2004 in Saitama | Saitama, Japan | TKO (punch rush/3 knockdowns) | 1 | 2:32 |
| 2003-10-31 | Win | (Belarus) Sergei Gur | K-1 Final Fight Stars War in Zagreb | Zagreb, Croatia | TKO (referee stoppage) | 2 | N/A |
| 2003-10-11 | Loss | (Belarus) Alexey Ignashov | K-1 World Grand Prix 2003 Final Elimination | Osaka, Japan | KO (right punch and right low kick) | 2 | 2:21 |
| 2003-09-21 | Win | (United States) Eric Esch | K-1 Survival 2003 Japan Grand Prix Final | Yokohama, Japan | KO (right head kick) | 2 | 1:10 |
| 2003-07-13 | Draw | (Brazil) Francisco Filho | K-1 World Grand Prix 2003 in Fukuoka | Fukuoka, Japan | Draw | 5 | 3:00 |
Fails to qualify for the K-1 World Grand Prix '03 final.
| 2003-05-30 | Loss | (Germany) Stefan Leko | K-1 World Grand Prix 2003 in Basel | Basel, Switzerland | Decision (unanimous) | 3 | 3:00 |
| 2003-04-06 | Win | (Japan) Tsuyoshi Nakasako | K-1 Beast 2003 | Yamagata, Japan | TKO | 2 | 1:02 |
| 2002-12-31 | Win | (Trinidad and Tobago) Gary Goodridge | Inoki Bom-Ba-Ye 2002 | Saitama, Japan | KO (right hook) | 1 | 2:12 |
| 2002-10-05 | Loss | (New Zealand) Mark Hunt | K-1 World Grand Prix 2002 Final Elimination | Saitama, Japan | Ext.R decision (unanimous) | 4 | 3:00 |
Fails to qualify for the K-1 World Grand Prix '02 final.
| 2002-09-22 | Win | (United States) Tom Erikson | K-1 Andy Spirits Japan GP 2002 Final | Osaka, Japan | KO (right hook) | 1 | 2:30 |
| 2002-08-17 | Loss | (Trinidad and Tobago) Gary Goodridge | K-1 World Grand Prix 2002 in Las Vegas | Las Vegas, Nevada, USA | KO (punches) | 1 | 1:38 |
Despite loss qualifies for K-1 World Grand Prix 2002 Final Elimination as invitee.
| 2002-03-03 | Loss | (New Zealand) Ray Sefo | K-1 World Grand Prix 2002 in Nagoya | Nagoya, Japan | Decision (unanimous) | 5 | 3:00 |
| 2001-12-08 | Win | (Australia) Adam Watt | K-1 World Grand Prix 2001 Final | Tokyo, Japan | Decision (unanimous) | 3 | 3:00 |
| 2001-10-08 | Loss | (Australia) Adam Watt | K-1 World Grand Prix 2001 in Fukuoka quarter-finals | Fukuoka, Japan | TKO (right punch/2 knockdowns) | 1 | 2:27 |
| 2001-07-20 | Win | (Netherlands) Lloyd van Dams | K-1 World Grand Prix 2001 in Nagoya semi-finals | Nagoya, Japan | Ext.R decision (majority) | 4 | 3:00 |
Despite winning Bernardo was unable to participate in final due to injury.
| 2001-07-20 | Win | (Japan) Takeru | K-1 World Grand Prix 2001 in Nagoya quarter-finals | Nagoya, Japan | TKO (corner stoppage) | 2 | 1:40 |
| 2001-03-17 | NC | (France) Jérôme Le Banner | K-1 Gladiators 2001 | Yokohama, Japan | NC | 1 | 3:00 |
| 2001-01-30 | Win | (Japan) Hiromi Amada | K-1 Rising 2001 | Matsuyama, Japan | TKO (corner stoppage) | 4 | 1:32 |
| 2000-10-09 | Win | (Croatia) Mirko Cro Cop | K-1 World Grand Prix 2000 in Fukuoka Final | Fukuoka, Japan | TKO (corner stoppage) | 1 | 1:07 |
Wins K-1 World Grand Prix 2000 in Fukuoka.
| 2000-10-09 | Win | (South Africa) Andrew Thomson | K-1 World Grand Prix 2000 in Fukuoka semi-finals | Fukuoka, Japan | TKO (doctor stoppage) | 1 | 0:34 |
| 2000-10-09 | Win | (Sweden) Jörgen Kruth | K-1 World Grand Prix 2000 in Fukuoka quarter-finals | Fukuoka, Japan | KO (right hook) | 1 | 2:24 |
| 2000-09-03 | Win | (Brazil) Sergio Espedito | K-1 Africa Grand Prix 2000 | Cape Town, South Africa | KO (straight right punch) | 1 | N/A |
| 1999-10-03 | Loss | (Croatia) Mirko Cro Cop | K-1 World Grand Prix '99 opening round | Osaka, Japan | TKO (3 knockdowns) | 1 | 1:20 |
Fails to qualify for K-1 World Grand Prix '99 final.
| 1999-08-22 | Win | (New Zealand) Rony Sefo | K-1 Spirits '99 | Tokyo, Japan | KO (left hook) | 4 | 1:24 |
| 1999-06-20 | Loss | (Australia) Sam Greco | K-1 Braves '99 | Fukuoka, Japan | Decision (unanimous) | 5 | 3:00 |
Losses W.A.K.O. Pro Muay Thai World Super Heavyweight (+94.1 kg) title.
| 1999-04-25 | Win | (Japan) Masaaki Satake | K-1 Revenge '99 | Yokohama, Japan | Decision (unanimous) | 5 | 3:00 |
| 1998-12-13 | Loss | (Netherlands) Peter Aerts | K-1 Grand Prix '98 Final Round semi-finals | Tokyo, Japan | TKO (referee stoppage/2 knockdowns) | 1 | 2:53 |
| 1998-12-13 | Win | (Brazil) Francisco Filho | K-1 Grand Prix '98 Final Round quarter-finals | Tokyo, Japan | KO (right overhand) | 3 | 1:35 |
| 1998-10-28 | Win | (Thailand) Sadau Kiatsongrit | K-1 Japan '98 Kamikaze | Tokyo, Japan | TKO (corner stoppage) | 2 | 2:00 |
| 1998-09-27 | Win | (United States) Maurice Smith | K-1 World Grand Prix '98 opening round | Osaka, Japan | Decision (unanimous) | 5 | 3:00 |
Qualifies for K-1 World Grand Prix '98 final.
| 1998-08-28 | Win | (South Africa) Andrew Thomson | K-1 Japan Grand Prix '98 | Tokyo, Japan | TKO (referee stoppage/right straight) | 1 | 3:03 |
| 1998-04-09 | Win | (Brazil) Glaube Feitosa | K-1 Dream '98 | Nagoya, Japan | TKO (3 knockdowns) | 1 | 1:42 |
| 1998-04-09 | Win | (Wales) Gordon Minors | K-1 Kings '98 | Yokohama, Japan | KO (punch) | 2 | 2:05 |
Wins Minors' WAKO Muay Thai World Super Heavyweight title.
| 1997-11-09 | Loss | (Netherlands) Peter Aerts | K-1 Grand Prix '97 Final quarter-finals | Tokyo, Japan | TKO (high kick and straight to the body) | 3 | 1:17 |
| 1997-09-07 | Win | (Croatia) Branko Cikatić | K-1 Grand Prix '97 1st round | Osaka, Japan | TKO (doctor stoppage) | 1 | 0:38 |
Qualifies for K-1 World Grand Prix '97 final.
| 1997-07 | Win | (United States) Mike Vieira | | Cape Town, South Africa | KO (right high kick) | 3 | 1:33 |
| 1997-06-07 | Loss | (Switzerland) Andy Hug | K-1 Fight Night '97 | Zurich, Switzerland | Decision (unanimous) | 5 | 3:00 |
Fight was for Andy's W.K.A. World Muay Thai Super Heavyweight title.
| 1997-04-29 | Loss | (Netherlands) Ernesto Hoost | K-1 Braves '97 | Fukuoka, Japan | TKO (referee stoppage/right hook) | 4 | 1:03 |
| 1997-03-16 | Win | (Japan) Masaaki Satake | K-1 Kings '97 | Yokohama, Japan | KO (right uppercut) | 2 | 1:24 |
| 1996-12-08 | Draw | (Australia) Stan Longinidis | K-1 Hercules '96 | Nagoya, Japan | Draw | 5 | 3:00 |
| 1996-10-18 | Win | (Netherlands) Peter Aerts | K-1 Star Wars '96 | Yokohama, Japan | KO (right hook) | 3 | 2:37 |
| 1996-09-01 | Win | (Netherlands) Peter Aerts | K-1 Revenge '96 | Osaka, Japan | DQ (groin kick) | 1 | 1:21 |
| 1996-05-06 | Loss | (Switzerland) Andy Hug | K-1 Grand Prix '96 Final | Yokohama, Japan | KO (left spinning low kick) | 2 | 1:18 |
Fight was for K-1 World Grand Prix '96.
| 1996-05-06 | Win | (Japan) Musashi | K-1 Grand Prix '96 semi-finals | Yokohama, Japan | Decision (unanimous) | 3 | 3:00 |
| 1996-05-06 | Win | (Netherlands) Peter Aerts | K-1 Grand Prix '96 quarter-finals | Yokohama, Japan | KO (left hook) | 3 | 0:13 |
| 1996-03-10 | Win | (United States) Jeff Roufus | K-1 Grand Prix '96 Opening Battle | Yokohama, Japan | TKO | 2 | 1:37 |
Qualifies for K-1 World Grand Prix '96 final.
| 1995-12-09 | Loss | (Netherlands) Peter Aerts | K-1 Hercules | Nagoya, Japan | KO (right hook) | 1 | 0:40 |
| 1995-09-03 | Win | (Switzerland) Andy Hug | K-1 Revenge II | Yokohama, Japan | KO (punch) | 2 | 2:43 |
| 1995-05-04 | Loss | (France) Jérôme Le Banner | K-1 Grand Prix '95 semi-finals | Tokyo, Japan | KO (right low kick) | 2 | 3:05 |
| 1995-05-04 | Win | (Australia) Stan Longinidis | K-1 Grand Prix '95 quarter-finals | Tokyo, Japan | KO (right high kick) | 3 | 1:42 |
| 1995-03-03 | Win | (Switzerland) Andy Hug | K-1 Grand Prix '95 Opening Battle | Tokyo, Japan | TKO (corner stoppage) | 3 | 2:39 |
Qualifies for K-1 World Grand Prix '95 final.
| 1994-10-00 | Loss | (France) Jérôme Le Banner | I.S.K.A. Intercontinental Championship | Cape Town, South Africa | Decision (unanimous) | 10 | 2:00 |
Fight was for I.S.K.A. Intercontinental title.

== Boxing record ==
Boxing record
11 wins (9 (T)KOs, 2 decisions), 1 loss (1 (T)KO), 1 draw
| Date | Result | Opponent | Event | Location | Method | Round | Time | Record |
| 2001-06-08 | Win | (United States) Peter McNeeley | K-1 World Grand Prix 2001 Preliminary South Africa | Cape Town, South Africa | TKO | 1 | 0:41 | 11–1–1 |
Wins World Boxing Foundation (W.B.F.) World Heavyweight Title.
| 2000-07-30 | Draw | (Australia) Justin Fortune | N/A | Nagoya, Japan | TD | 1 | N/A | 10–1–1 |
| 2000-05-12 | Win | (Czech Republic) Daniel Jerling | N/A | Szekszárd, Hungary | TKO | 6 | N/A | 10–1 |
| 2000-01-21 | Win | (United States) Scott Conner | N/A | Chicago, Illinois, USA | TKO | 2 | N/A | 9–1 |
| 1996-03-31 | Win | (United States) Juan Quintana | N/A | Portland, Maine, USA | PTS | 6 | N/A | 8–1 |
| 1995-12-02 | Win | (Argentina) Alberto Toribio Coman | N/A | Cape Town, South Africa | TKO | 4 | N/A | 7–1 |
| 1995-09-10 | Win | (Mexico) Hector Fernandez | N/A | Tijuana, Mexico | KO | 1 | N/A | 6–1 |
| 1994-11-27 | Win | (South Africa) Themba Msweli | N/A | Cape Town, South Africa | KO | 3 | N/A | 5–1 |
| 1994-05-18 | Win | (South Africa) Nzuzu Manyube | N/A | Cape Town, South Africa | TKO | 1 | N/A | 4–1 |
| 1993-11-06 | Win | (Zambia) Matthews Zulu | N/A | Sun City, South Africa | PTS | 4 | N/A | 3–1 |
| 1993-07-25 | Win | (South Africa) Graham Makazi | N/A | Cape Town, South Africa | KO | 1 | N/A | 2–1 |
| 1993-04-06 | Loss | (South Africa) Anton Nel | N/A | Temba, South Africa | TKO | 1 | N/A | 1–1 |
| 1993-02-28 | Win | (South Africa) Delias Musemwa | N/A | Cape Town, South Africa | KO | 3 | N/A | 1–0 |

== Mixed martial arts record ==
| Res. | Record | Opponent | Method | Event | Date | Round | Time | Location | Notes |
|---|---|---|---|---|---|---|---|---|---|
| Draw | 0-0-1 | (Japan) Nobuhiko Takada | Draw | Inoki Bom-Ba-Ye 2001 - K-1 vs. Inoki | 31 December 2003 | 3 | 3:00 | Saitama, Japan | |

== See also ==
- List of K-1 events
- List of K-1 champions
- List of male kickboxers
