= Sadau Kiatsongrit =

Thai Muay Thai kickboxer

- Born: June 10, 1967 (age 59)
- Native name: เสือดาว เกียรติทรงฤทธิ์
- Other names: Sadau Por.Pisitchet; Thai Leopard
- Nationality: Thai
- Height: 180 cm (5 ft 11 in)
- Weight: 86 kg (190 lb; 13 st 8 lb)
- Division: Light Heavyweight; Cruiserweight; Heavyweight
- Style: Muay Thai
- Fighting out of: Thailand
- Team: Kiatsongrit; Por.Pisitchet

Sadau Kiatsongrit (also written as Suadao), otherwise known as Sadau Por.Pisitchet (Thai: เสือดาว เกียรติทรงฤทธิ์, เสือดาว ป.พิสิฐเชษฐ์; born June 10, 1967), is a Thai Muay Thai kickboxer who used to fight many foreign kickboxers in K-1 events.

== Athletic career ==
Sadau ("leopard") is the second fighter after Changpuek Kiatsongrit, which his stable (Kiatsongrit gym) determined to raise up to be a Thai kickboxer in the heaviest weight class that fights with foreign kickboxers in the international level.

On April 26, 1992, in a special event of popular promoter Songchai Rattanasuban at Rajpracha Samasai School, Phra Pradaeng, Samut Prakan, at the age of 25, he defeated the Dutch legend Rob Kaman by unanimous decision through a total of five rounds.

In 1993 he TD (doctor stopped the contest) Mennis Luc Verheijen a hot-tempered kickboxer from Belgium with right elbow in the fourth round.

On July 20, 1996 he challenged the vacant World Muaythai Council (WMC) cruiserweight championship against Japanese Musashi; as he ranked no. 1, while Musashi ranked no. 2, in a bout held on a temporary open-air ring beside Prasat Hin Phanom Rung, 77 km (47.8 mi) south of Buriram city. As a result he won unanimously 50–46, 50–46, 50–46 after five rounds.

Sadau Kiatsongrit had versus with many top-line fighters such as Andy Hug, Stefan Leko, Mike Bernardo, Stan Longinidis etc.

== Titles ==
- World Muaythai Council (WMC)
  - 1996 WMC Cruiserweight World Champion (190 lb)
  - 1992 WMTC World -75 kg Champion
- Lumpinee Stadium
  - Lumpinee Stadium Welterweight Champion

== Fight record ==
| Date | Result | Opponent | Event | Location | Method | Round | Time |
|---|---|---|---|---|---|---|---|
| 1999-08-22 | Loss | (China) Teng Jun | K-1 Spirits '99 | Tokyo, Japan | Decision (Unanimous) | 3 | 3:00 |
| 1998-10-28 | Loss | (South Africa) Mike Bernardo | K-1 Kamikaze '98 | Tokyo, Japan | TKO (Corner Stoppage) | 1 | 2:00 |
| 1997-10-12 | Loss | (Japan) Shuji Abe | MAJKF | Tokyo, Japan | Decision | 5 | 3:00 |
| 1997-09-07 | Loss | (United States) Curtis Schuster | K-1 World GP 1997 Opening | Osaka, Japan | Decision (Majority) | 3 | 3:00 |
| 1997-04-29 | Loss | (Germany) Stefan Leko | K-1 Braves '97 | Fukuoka, Japan | Decision (Unanimous) | 5 | 3:00 |
| 1996-07-20 | Win | (Japan) Musashi | | Buriram, Thailand | Decision | 5 | 3:00 |
Won the WMC Cruiserweight World 190lbs Title.
| 1996-06-02 | Loss | (Switzerland) Andy Hug | K-1 Fight Night II | Zürich, Switzerland | KO (Right Hook) | 2 | 3:00 |
| 1996-03-10 | Loss | (Australia) Stan Longinidis | K-1 Grand Prix '96 Opening Battle | Yokohama, Japan | Ext.R Decision | 6 | 3:00 |
| 1993-00-00 | Win | (Belgium) Mennis Luc Verheijen | | Thailand | TKO (Right Elbow) | 4 | |
| 1992 | Win | (Netherlands) Perry Ubeda | | Thailand | | | |
For the W.M.T.C. Muay Thai World title -75 kg.
| 1992-04-26 | Win | (Netherlands) Rob Kaman | | Phra Pradaeng, Thailand | Decision | 5 | 3:00 |
Legend: Win Loss Draw/No contest Notes
