= Dennis Alexio =

American kickboxer (born 1959)

- Born: Dennis Raymond Dick; March 12, 1959 (age 67); Vacaville, California, U.S.
- Other names: The Terminator; The Menace; The Portuguese Man o' War; Kaheke
- Height: 5 ft 11 in (1.8 m)
- Weight: 203 lb (92 kg; 14.5 st)
- Division: Light Heavyweight; Cruiserweight; Heavyweight
- Reach: 72.5 in (184 cm)
- Style: Kajukenbo; Kickboxing; Tang Soo Do
- Fighting out of: Honolulu, Hawaii, U.S.
- Trainer: Al Lagardo; Nasser Niavaroni; Bob Smith; Jacob “Stitch” Duran
- Years active: 1980–1999

Professional boxing record
- Total: 7
- Wins: 6
- By knockout: 4
- Losses: 1
- By knockout: 1
- Draws: 0

Kickboxing record
- Total: 73
- Wins: 68
- By knockout: 63
- Losses: 2
- Draws: 1
- No contests: 2

Other information
- Children: 5

Dennis Alexio (born Dennis Raymond Dick; March 12, 1959) is an American former professional kickboxer and actor who competed in the light heavyweight, cruiserweight and heavyweight divisions. Beginning his career as a light heavyweight in 1980, Alexio embarked on an extensive, knockout-laden undefeated streak before losing a decision to Don "The Dragon" Wilson in a World Kickboxing Association (WKA) World Super Light Heavyweight Full Contact Championship match in 1984. He rebounded from this by winning the Professional Karate Association (PKA) World Light Heavyweight title that same year before moving up to cruiserweight and taking the International Sport Karate Association (ISKA) World Cruiserweight Full Contact title.

In the late 1980s, he began his transition to the heavyweight division where he won six world titles and was at one point considered the undisputed World Heavyweight Champion. He faced the two toughest tests of his career in 1992 against Branko Cikatić and Stan Longinidis - both of whom were heavier fighters - fighting to a controversial draw with Cikatić and losing to Longinidis via an early low kick KO which resulted in a broken leg. He won 16 championship titles before retiring in 1999. An aggressive fighter possessing good boxing skills, a powerful spinning back kick and Muay Thai style roundhouse kick to the midsection, head and legs, Alexio retired with an impressive 92% KO ratio.

In April 2017, he was sentenced to 15 years in prison on multiple counts of fraud and tax evasion.

== Early life ==
Alexio was born and raised in Vacaville, California, the son of a high school teacher and coach. He attended Will C. Wood Middle School before graduating from Vacaville High School in 1977. Alexio was a standout athlete in his youth, excelling in American football, baseball and basketball. In an interview with Inside Karate magazine, he claimed to have turned down an offer to play baseball with the Los Angeles Dodgers. He began his martial arts training in Kajukenbo and in college, he played American football as a linebacker, using karate to get faster and more flexible for football. Liking karate, he decided to pursue the full contact aspect of it, not just point sparring. So Alexio started learning other styles like tang soo do before moving on to full-contact karate/professional kickboxing, where he added boxing and Muay Thai skills to his kickboxing repertoire along with his karate training.

== Career ==
=== Early career (1980–1983) ===
Alexio debuted as a professional kickboxer in early 1980, losing to Mike King via technical knockout in Culver City, California in his freshman appearance. The outcome of the bout was later overturned to a no contest by the PKA, however, with the fight deemed a mismatch as Alexio was competing for the first time with no amateur fights or any fighting experience, while King was a Professional Full Contact Karate/Kickboxer. Alexio learned from that fight and trained hard, he went on to win seventeen consecutive fights after that, all by knockout with only one going past the third round. In his first international match-up, Alexio stopped Basil Gura with a kick in round three of their contest in Newcastle, New South Wales, Australia on November 19, 1983.

Alexio went by the ring names "The Menace" and "The Terminator".

=== Light heavyweight and cruiserweight world championships (1984–1986) ===
Having established himself as a force on the world stage with his extensive winning streak, Alexio was given the chance to fight Don "The Dragon" Wilson for the inaugural WKA World Super Light Heavyweight (-83.2 kg/183.4 lb) Full Contact Championship in Hollywood in Wilson's home state of Florida on March 29, 1984. Televised on NBC's Sports World and with the #1 spot in the STAR System World Kickboxing Ratings on the line, Alexio's straight forward, boxing-based style played into the hands of the counterfighter Wilson, who pelted him with unchecked low kicks throughout the twelve round bout. Wilson won by a unanimous decision 119-106,119-112,118-114. Alexio disputed the result, calling it a "hometown decision." A second bout between the pair would never come to fruition.

Alexio rebounded from this defeat by winning the PKA World Light Heavyweight title in his hometown of Vacaville on September 14, 1984, knocking down Rob Salazar twice in round five en route to a decision win. He made successful defences of this belt against Bernard Clark and Neil Singleton the following year before moving up to the cruiserweight division where he was soon crowned the International Sport Karate Association (ISKA) World Cruiserweight (-88.2 kg/194.4 lb) Full Contact Champion. He also briefly pursued a career in professional boxing between 1984 and 1985, going 5-1 with five KO victories.

In an ISKA title defence on August 16, 1986, in Denver, Colorado, Alexio survived an early scare as he was dropped with a big right hook from Lowell Nash in the first round, coming back by flooring Nash with a right hook of his own before finishing him with a right cross at the end of the fourth.

=== Transition to heavyweight (1987–1991) ===
By 1987, Alexio's record consisted of twenty-six wins and one loss, and so he made the transition to the heavyweight class where, at 1.80m/5 ft 11in and just over 91 kg/200 lb, he was one of the smaller competitors. After winning the Karate International Council of Kickboxing (KICK) full contact world heavyweight title, he made one last defence of his ISKA cruiserweight belt on June 3, 1987, when he outpointed Larry McFadden over twelve rounds in Stateline, Nevada. Less than a month later, he defended his KICK Heavyweight belt and also won the vacant ISKA Heavyweight (-96.4 kg/212.5 lb) title against Jeff Hollins on June 20, 1987, in Denver.

On August 6, 1990, at Harrah's Lake Tahoe in Stateline, Alexio faced Canadian taekwondo stylist Darrell Henegan in a heavyweight unification fight with Alexio's ISKA and KICK titles, and Henegan's Fight Factory Karate Association (FFKA) title on the line. Alexio won via TKO after the referee stopped the fight towards the end of the fifth round.

In late 1990, Alexio relocated to Waianae, Hawaii. Adopting the nickname "Kaheke", Alexio began fighting in a Hawaiian grass skirt, which, along with his entrance music of "The Final Countdown" by Swedish rock band Europe, became his trademark. He fought twenty times at the Neal S. Blaisdell Center in Honolulu, winning all twenty by knockout.

In another heavyweight title unification bout, Alexio put his ISKA belt on the line against Jerry Rhome with the vacant Professional Kickboxing Council (PKC) title also up for grabs at KarateMania III held at Caesars Tahoe in Stateline on August 24, 1991. He floored Rhome with a roundhouse kick on the bell at the end of the fourth before going out and finishing him off early in five. Alexio then defeated a number of middle-of-the-road challengers from around the world under full contact before seeking super fights with champions from other rule sets.

=== Fights with Cikatić and Longinidis (1992) ===
"Indeed everything about Alexio screamed larger-than-life. He oozed charisma and it wasn't hard to see why he had been offered several more silver screen roles and developed the biggest following in kickboxing history – especially among female fans."

— Michael Schiavello on Alexio's stardom in the early 1990s

On March 16, 1992, Alexio faced his toughest opponent to date when he met Croatian Muay Thai fighter Branko Cikatić in at the World Martial Arts Challenge at the Thomas & Mack Center in Las Vegas, Nevada. Although Alexio still held the ISKA, KICK and FFKA heavyweight world titles, and Cikatić was the World Kickboxing Association (WKA)–International Kick Boxing Federation (IKBF) World Cruiserweight Champion, the only title on the line was the inaugural World Martial Arts Challenge (WMAC) Heavyweight Championship. The rules of the bout were disputed between both fighters right up to the day of the fight. Alexio, who had competed exclusively under full contact rules, wanted both fighters to wear foot pads. Cikatić, a Muay Thai stylist and international rules fighter, wanted low kicks as well as the Thai clinch to be allowed. In the end, low kicks were allowed and Alexio wore foot pads, and knees and the clinch were banned. The duration of the fight was set at eight, three-minute rounds.

The first two rounds were a battle but Alexio was winning with his barrage of un-answered uppercuts, hooks to the head and body kicks, but Cikatić was game and did fire back. Alexio utilized his better boxing skills but Cikatić used his powerful low kicks to his advantage. Cikatić was docked a point in the second round for kneeing Alexio in the clinch, which was not legal for this bout. The fight then ended in confusion in the third round when a stoppage was called as Alexio's right foot pad came off. The referee, Pat Burleson, decided to continue the fight without retrieving the foot pad as it had fallen out of the ring. However, before the fight was restarted Alexio hit Cikatić with two left hooks and then kicked at him but missed as he fell to the canvas. The fight was stopped there and, as it had gone less than half of the set eight rounds, was ruled a technical draw.

Following this, Alexio went on to collect three straight KO wins before agreeing to fight Australian Stan Longinidis, an up-and-coming fighter who had been calling him out for some time. One of the most highly anticipated fights in the sport's history at the time, and a bad-blooded affair, the bout took place in Longinidis' hometown of Melbourne, Victoria on December 6, 1992, with the vacant ISKA International rules Heavyweight Championship of the World up for grabs. Six seconds into the fight, Longinidis hit Alexio with a right low kick, causing Alexio's fibula and tibia to break. Officially, the fight lasted just fifteen seconds and Longinidis was named the winner via technical knockout.

Alexio and his manager, Bob Wall, disputed the fight and claimed that the fracture was caused by Alexio twisting his leg on a depression in the ring floor. Although Wall did initially comment after the fight, that Longinidis clearly won with an excellent legal kick. The outcome of the review was divided: the United States division of the ISKA overturned the ruling to a no contest, while the WKA and Australian division of the ISKA upheld the original decision. A rematch between Longinidis and Alexio was discussed but never materialized.

=== Later career (1993–1999) ===
One of kickboxing's biggest stars at the time, Dennis Alexio was offered the opportunity to fight at UFC 1, the first mixed martial arts tournament held in North America, in 1993 but declined because of the money and he was still recovering from his broken leg and a screw was sheared off by accident into his leg which complicated his return to the ring. Alexio recovered from his broken leg and made a comeback on January 22, 1994, in Lake Tahoe, where he defeated England's Heavyweight Kickboxing Champion and K-1 Kickboxer Mark Russell Of England via technical knockout in the second round to defend the PKC World Heavyweight Full Contact Karate/Kickboxing title. His first significant fight since his comeback came on March 26, 1994, in Montreal, Quebec, Canada when he defeated Dick Kimber to defend the PKC belt at KarateMania VIII. He was ordered by the referee to remove his Hawaiian grass skirt at the end of round one, and came out wearing a pair of traditional kickboxing trunks in round two and battered Kimber to a TKO victory.

He would end out his career fighting mostly in Honolulu and under full contact rules, beating a number of K-1 fighters. During the mid-1990s, he began to face growing criticism of his opponents, with Rick Roufus and Maurice Smith claiming that he was avoiding them and other high-level heavyweights, but he has stated on numerous occasions on television that he would take them on but the promoters couldn't get the fighters together with the money or the cable networks and pay per view to televise the fights with the arrival and popularity of the UFC/MMA American Kickboxing viewership was on the decline and the television ratings and Pay per view buys weren't there any longer for the networks to justify those big money fights so they never happened.

On May 31, 1997, Alexio won the vacant International Kickboxing Federation (IKF) World Heavyweight Championship when he defeated European Super Heavyweight Kickboxing Champion Barrington Patterson, who was often referred to as one of Britain's "hardest men", by TKO at the end of the fifth round in Honolulu. His first defense of this title was on November 21, 1997, when he defeated Jeff Gibson. In May 1998 in Sacramento, California, he defeated French Kickboxing/Savate Heavyweight Champion Achille Roger of France by TKO in round five to defend his title for a second time. In 1999 he fought Anthony Elmore and again defended his IKF World Heavyweight title winning by KO in the 12th round. His title was retired by the IKF on November 24, 2003. The IKF organization had been trying to contact Alexio since June 2003, to discuss what his future plans for the sport were, such as a title defense or a retirement of his title. However, they never received any return phone call.

His last ever fight came on December 18, 1999, at Honolulu's Neal S. Blaisdell Center, where he knocked out Welshman Gordon Minors to win the WAKO Pro World Heavyweight Full Contact Championship, his eight world title.

== Acting appearances ==
Alexio starred alongside Jean-Claude Van Damme in the 1989 film Kickboxer. He also had a small role in the 1988 film Picasso Trigger in addition to an appearance in a 1990 episode of Super Force.

== Legal issues ==
On July 1, 2003, Alexio was charged with two counts of bank fraud in addition to failing to pay child support. On December 20, 2005, a federal magistrate ordered that he be detained and returned to California, where he failed to show for sentencing for failing to pay more than $34,000 in child support.

On June 12, 2007, Alexio was arrested at his home in Aiea, Hawaii for failing to appear as a witness before a federal grand jury and on an outstanding federal warrant issued in San Francisco for bank fraud. A federal judge in West Virginia had issued a warrant for his arrest on April 20, 2007 when he failed to appear as summoned to testify in a fraud case.

Alexio was again arrested by federal agents at a coffee shop in Aiea on November 21, 2013, and his wife Anitalei was later arrested at their home. The couple was charged with 36 counts of filing false tax claims, wire fraud and money laundering from December 2008 to August 2013. The federal government also accused him of sending false documents to obtain gold bars and coins worth hundreds of thousands of U.S. dollars. Both pleaded not guilty and were scheduled to stand trial on the charges in January 2014.

During his trial, Alexio behaved erratically and used a sovereign citizen line of defense. The court eventually terminated his self-representation. On January 22, 2016, Alexio was found guilty on 28 counts, including tax fraud, theft, money laundering and using false and fictitious financial instruments. On April 27, 2017, Alexio was sentenced to 15 years in federal prison. He is serving his sentence at Federal Correctional Institution, Beaumont under BOP Inmate Number 93052-011 and is scheduled for release in 2027.

== Championships and awards ==
=== Kickboxing ===
- Fight Factory Karate Association
  - FFKA World Heavyweight Full Contact Championship
- International Kickboxing Federation
  - IKF World Heavyweight (-97.73 kg/215.5 lb) Full Contact Championship
- International Sport Karate Association
  - ISKA World Cruiserweight (-88.2 kg/194.4 lb) Full Contact Championship
  - ISKA World Heavyweight (-96.4 kg/212.5 lb) Full Contact Championship
- Karate International Council of Kickboxing
  - KICK World Heavyweight Full Contact Championship
- Professional Karate Association
  - PKA World Light Heavyweight Championship
- Professional Kickboxing Council
  - PKC World Heavyweight Full Contact Championship
- World Association of Kickboxing Organizations
  - WAKO Pro World Heavyweight (-94.1 kg/207.5 lb) Full Contact Championship

== Boxing record ==
Boxing record
6 wins (4 KOs), 1 loss, 0 draws
Date	Result	Opponent	Venue	Location	Method	Round	Time	Record
1985-11-02	Win	(United States) Kevin Smith		Sacramento, California, US	KO	2		6-1
1985-06-18	Win	(United States) Tim Jones		Sacramento, California, US	Decision	6	3:00	5-1
1985-02-08	Loss	(United States) Mike Randle		Napa, California, US	TKO	8		4-1
1984-11-02	Win	(United States) Tommy Tellery		Napa, California, US	DQ	2		4-0
1984-07-13	Win	(United States) Tony Willingham		Napa, California, US	KO	4		3-0
1984-06-12	Win	(United States) Philip Rosas		Sacramento, California, US	KO	2		2-0
1984-02-22	Win	(United States) Darrell Singleton		Santa Rosa, California, US	KO	3		1-0
Legend: Win Loss Draw/no contest Notes

== Kickboxing and karate record ==
Kickboxing record
68 wins (63 KOs), 2 losses, 1 draw, 1 no contest
Date	Result	Opponent	Event	Location	Method	Round	Time	Record
1999-12-18	Win	(Wales) Gordon Minors	Neal S. Blaisdell Center	Honolulu, Hawaii, US	KO	5		68-1-1 (3)
Wins the WAKO Pro World Heavyweight (-94.1kg/207.5lb) Full Contact Championship.
1999-05-08	Win	(United States) Anthony Elmore	Neal S. Blaisdell Center	Honolulu, Hawaii, US	KO	12		67-1-1 (3)
1999-03-06	Win	(Wales) Ricky Nickelson	Neal S. Blaisdell Center	Honolulu, Hawaii, US	KO			66-1-1 (3)
1998-05-01	Win	(France) Achille Roger	IKF: Uppercut Fight Night 1998, Memorial Auditorium	Sacramento, California, US	TKO	4		65-1-1 (3)
Defends the IKF World Heavyweight (-97.73kg/215.5lb) Full Contact Championship.
1997-11-21	Win	(United States) Jeff Gibson	Neal S. Blaisdell Center	Honolulu, Hawaii, US	KO			64-1-1 (3)
Defends the IKF World Heavyweight (-97.73kg/215.5lb) Full Contact Championship.
1997-05-31	Win	(England) Barrington Patterson	Neal S. Blaisdell Center	Honolulu, Hawaii, US	TKO	5		63-1-1 (3)
Wins the IKF World Heavyweight (-97.73kg/215.5lb) Full Contact Championship.
1996-11-02	Win	(United States) Larry Cureton	Neal S. Blaisdell Center	Honolulu, Hawaii, US	KO (spinning back kick)	2		62-1-1 (3)
1996-08-17	Win	(Japan) Masaaki Miyamoto	Neal S. Blaisdell Center	Honolulu, Hawaii, US	TKO	6	1:01	61-1-1 (3)
Defends the ISKA World Heavyweight (-96.4kg/212.5lb) Full Contact Championship.
1996-05-11	Win	(France) Stephane Revellion	Neal S. Blaisdell Center	Honolulu, Hawaii, US	KO	5		60-1-1 (3)
1995-12-01	Win	(United States) Dennis Lane	Neal S. Blaisdell Center	Honolulu, Hawaii, US	KO (kick)	1		59-1-1 (3)
1995-11-12	Win	(New Zealand) Hiriwa Te Rangi		Guam	KO	3		58-1-1 (3)
1995-07-01	Win	(England) Stuart Green	Neal S. Blaisdell Center	Honolulu, Hawaii, US	KO	6		57-1-1 (3)
1994-11-01	No Contest	(Brazil) Sérgio Batarelli	Neal S. Blaisdell Center	Honolulu, Hawaii, US	No contest (injury)	1	2:00	56-1-1 (3)
1994-03-26	Win	(United States) Dick Kimber	PKA: KarateMania VIII	Montreal, Quebec, Canada	KO (punches and left body kick)	2	2:26	56-1-1 (2)
Defends the PKC World Heavyweight Full Contact Championship.
1994-01-22	Win	(England) Mark Russell	PKA: KarateMania VII	Stateline, Nevada, US	KO (left hook)	2	1:40	55-1-1 (2)
Defends the PKC World Heavyweight Full Contact Championship.
1993-08-27	Win	(United States) Dennis Downey	Neal S. Blaisdell Center	Honolulu, Hawaii, US	KO (right high kick)	3		54-1-1 (2)
1992-12-06	Loss (Note: The WKA and ISKA-Australia record the outcome as a win for Longinidis, while the ISKA-US records it as a no contest.)	(Australia) Stan Longinidis	Clash of the Titans, Melbourne SEC	Melbourne, Australia	(leg kick)	1	0:15	53-1-1 (2)
For the ISKA World Heavyweight (-96.4kg/212.5lb) International Rules Championship.
1992-11-10	Win	(United States) Lawrence White	Neal S. Blaisdell Center	Honolulu, Hawaii, US	KO	2		53-1-1 (1)
1992-09-06	Win	(Russia) Dmitry Kochergin	Neal S. Blaisdell Center	Honolulu, Hawaii, US	TKO (stoppage)	2		52-1-1 (1)
Originally ruled a KO victory for Alexio in round one. The match is restarted and ends via stoppage in round two.
1992-07-11	Win	(United States) Dennis Downey	Neal S. Blaisdell Center	Honolulu, Hawaii, US	KO (kick)	4		51-1-1 (1)
1992-03-16	Draw	(Croatia) Branko Cikatić	World Martial Arts Challenge, Thomas & Mack Center	Las Vegas, Nevada, US	Technical draw	3	1:25	50-1-1 (1)
For the WMAC World Heavyweight Championship.
1992-02-05	Win	(France) Clement Salles	Neal S. Blaisdell Center	Honolulu, Hawaii, US	KO	5		50-1 (1)
1991-12-20	Win	(France) David Coradini		Pirae, Tahiti	KO (kick)	1		49-1 (1)
1991-12-07	Win	(United States) Larry Cureton	Arco Arena	Sacramento, California, US	KO	5		48-1 (1)
1991-10-17	Win	(Brazil) Espedito da Silva	Neal S. Blaisdell Center	Honolulu, Hawaii, US	KO	4		47-1 (1)
1991-08-24	Win	(United States) Jerry Rhome	PKA: KarateMania III, Caesars Tahoe	Stateline, Nevada, US	TKO (referee stoppage)	5	0:26	46-1 (1)
Defends the ISKA World Heavyweight (-96.4kg/212.5lb) Full Contact Championship and wins the PKC World Heavyweight Full Contact Championship.
1991-06-08	Win	(United States) Ahmad Jihad	Neal S. Blaisdell Center	Honolulu, Hawaii, US	KO (kick)	2		45-1 (1)
1991-04-03	Win	(United States) Barry Boom Boom Byers	Neal S. Blaisdell Center	Honolulu, Hawaii, US	KO (kick)	3		44-1 (1)
1990-11-29	Win	(United States) Horace Craft	Neal S. Blaisdell Center	Honolulu, Hawaii, US	KO (kick)	4		43-1 (1)
1990-11-01	Win	(Canada) Michael McDonald		Sacramento, California, US	KO	3		42-1 (1)
1990-08-06	Win	(Canada) Darrell Henegan	Harrah's Lake Tahoe	Stateline, Nevada, US	TKO (punches)	5	1:54	41-1 (1)
Defends the ISKA World Heavyweight (-96.4 kg/212 lb) Full Contact Championship and the KICK World Heavyweight Full Contact Championship, and wins the FFKA World Heavyweight Full Contact Championship.
1990-05-18	Win	(United States) Dino Homsey		Vacaville, California, US	KO (kick)	8		40-1 (1)
1990-04-27	Win	(United States) Curtis Jackson		Sacramento, California, US	KO	4		39-1 (1)
1990-02-19	Win	(United States) Horace Craft	Radisson Hotel	Sacramento, California, US	KO (punches and left high kicks)	2		38-1 (1)
1989-11-07	Win	(United States) Paul Madison		Stateline, Nevada, US	KO (kick)	3		37-1 (1)
1989-06-05	Win	(United States) Jeff Hollins		Inglewood, California, US	Decision	11	2:00	36-1 (1)
Defends the KICK World Heavyweight Full Contact Championship.
1988-11-16	Win	(United States) Maurice Tornisi	Madison Square Garden	New York City, New York, US	KO	3		35-1 (1)
1988-08-27	Win	(United States) Tim Jones		Tampa, Florida, US	KO (kick)	2		34-1 (1)
1988-06-03	Win	(United States) Jeff Buck		Stateline, Nevada, US	KO	5		33-1 (1)
1988-05-15	Win	(United States) Tom Mouton		Miami, Florida, US	KO (kick)	3		32-1 (1)
1987-11-17	Win	(United States) Al Mims		Denver, Colorado, US	KO (kick)	2		31-1 (1)
1987-06-20	Win	(United States) Jeff Hollins		Denver, Colorado, US	Decision (unanimous)	12	2:00	30-1 (1)
Defends the KICK World Heavyweight Full Contact Championship and wins the ISKA World Heavyweight (-96.4 kg/212 lb) Full Contact Championship.
1987-06-03	Win	(United States) Larry McFadden		Stateline, Nevada, US	Decision	12	2:00	29-1 (1)
Defends the ISKA World Cruiserweight (-88.2kg/194.4lb) Full Contact Championship.
1987-04-04	Win	(United States) Mike Winklejohn		Denver, Colorado, US	Decision (unanimous)	7	2:00	28-1 (1)
1987-03-15	Win	(United States) Pete Master		Richmond, California, US	KO (kick)	5		27-1 (1)
1987-02-11	Win	(United States) Zinnie Reynolds		Vallejo, California, US	KO (kick)	3		26-1 (1)
1986-08-16	Win	(United States) Lowell Nash		Denver, Colorado, US	KO (right cross)	4	2:00	25-1 (1)
Defends the ISKA World Cruiserweight (-88.2kg/194.4lb) Full Contact Championship.
1986-07-17	Win	(United States) J.D. Johnson		Dixon, California, US	KO	6		24-1 (1)
1985-12-14	Win	(United States) Neil Singleton		Sacramento, California, US	KO	5		23-1 (1)
Defends the PKA World Light Heavyweight Championship.
1985-11-02	Win	(United States) Kevin Smith		Sacramento, California, US	KO	2		22-1 (1)
1985-04-06	Win	(United States) Bernard Clark		Sacramento, California, US	TKO (left high kick and punches)	4	1:19	21-1 (1)
Defends the PKA World Light Heavyweight Championship.
1984-12-08	Win	(United States) Cedric Rogers		Sacramento, California, US	KO	9		20-1 (1)
1984-09-14	Win	(United States) Rob Salazar		Vacaville, California, US	Decision (unanimous)	12	2:00	19-1 (1)
Wins the PKA World Light Heavyweight Championship.
1984-07-11	Win	(United States) Al Mims		Reno, Nevada, US	KO (kick)	2		18-1 (1)
1984-03-29	Loss	(United States) Don Wilson		Hollywood, Florida, US	Decision (unanimous)	12	2:00	17-1 (1)
For the WKA World Super Light Heavyweight (-83.2kg/183.4lb) Full Contact Championship and the STAR World Super Light Heavyweight (-83.2kg/183.4lb) Championship.
1983-11-19	Win	(Australia) Basil Gura		Newcastle, Australia	KO (kick)	3		17-0 (1)
For the Pacific Cruiserweight Title.
1983-10-22	Win	(United States) Al Mims		Vallejo, California, US	KO	3		16-0 (1)
1983-09-10	Win	(United States) Cedric Rogers		Sacramento, California, US	KO	3		15-0 (1)
1983-05-09	Win	(United States) Jerold Curry		Vallejo, California, US	KO	3		14-0 (1)
1983-03-11	Win	(United States) Neil Singleton	Chicago Fights	Chicago, Illinois, US	TKO (referee stoppage)	2		13-0 (1)
1982-11-05	Win	(United States) Mike Duvall		Boise, Idaho, US	KO	1		12-0 (1)
1982-08-05	Win	(United States) Rick Dunn		Sparks, Nevada, US	KO (kick)	1		11-0 (1)
1982-06-02	Win	(United States) Bill Holmes		Sacramento, California, US	KO (kick)	1		10-0 (1)
1982-05-26	Win	(United States) Ed Taft		Sacramento, California, US	KO	2		9-0 (1)
1982-04-30	Win	(United States) Ron Jenkins		Sacramento, California, US	KO (kick)	1		8-0 (1)
1982-04-28	Win	(United States) Jess Addison		Sacramento, California, US	KO (kick)	1		7-0 (1)
1982-02-02	Win	(United States) John Knight		Santa Rosa, California, US	KO (kick)	2		6-0 (1)
1981-11-13	Win	(United States) Bruce Leamer		San Jose, California, US	KO (kick)	4		5-0 (1)
1981-02-25	Win	(United States) Van Palacio		Oakland, California, US	KO (kick)	2		4-0 (1)
1980-11-25	Win	(United States) Wayne Taylor		Culver City, California, US	KO	1		3-0 (1)
1980-09-06	Win	(United States) Bill Norman		Stockton, California, US	KO	2		2-0 (1)
1980-06-30	Win	(United States) Reggie Eaton		Stockton, California, US	KO	3		1-0 (1)
1980-00-00	No Contest	(United States) Mike King	Veteran's Auditorium	Culver City, California, US	No contest (overturned by the PKA)			0-0 (1)
Originally a TKO loss for Alexio. Overturned to a no contest by the PKA as the fight was deemed a mismatch.
Legend: Win Loss Draw/no contest Notes
