= Raoumaru =

Japanese kickboxer

Ishiyama Tomohiro
- Born: Ishiyama Tomohiro; August 8, 1985 (age 41)
- Native name: 羅王丸
- Other names: Raoumaru
- Nationality: Japanese; South Korean
- Height: 1.85 m (6 ft 1 in)
- Weight: 105 kg (231 lb; 16 st 7 lb)
- Division: Heavyweight
- Style: Kickboxing
- Team: TARGET

Kickboxing record
- Total: 26
- Wins: 16
- By knockout: 11
- Losses: 10
- By knockout: 7

Ishiyama Tomohiro "Raoumaru" (Japanese: 羅王丸; born September 8, 1985) is a Japanese heavyweight kickboxer competing in RISE promotion.

== Career ==
Raoumaru ended the 2012 year by competing in the sixteen-man 2012 Glory Heavyweight Grand Slam at Glory 4: Tokyo - 2012 Heavyweight Grand Slam in Saitama, Japan on December 31, 2012. Raoumaru lost the fight at the opening stage, Saki floored him twice in round one and forced the referee to stop the bout.

He challenged Nicolas Wamba for the vacant World Kickboxing Network Kickboxing Rules Super Heavyweight World Championship on 22 March 2014 in Agde, France at 11th Trophee de l’Ephebe event. Raoumaru lost the fight by TKO as the referee stopped the fight in round 2.

== Titles ==
- 2011 K-King Heavyweight Tournament Champion
- 2010 RISE - Rising Rookies Cup Winner

== Kickboxing record ==
Kickboxing record
Date	Result	Opponent	Event	Location	Method	Round	Time
2016-05-29	Loss	(Japan) Natsuki	RISE 111	Tokyo, Japan	TKO	1	2:34
2015-08-22	Win	(Japan) Nankoku Chojin	SHOOT BOXING 30th ANNIVERSARY CAESAR TIME!	Tokyo, Japan	TKO	2	0:39
2015-05-31	Win	(Japan) Nankoku Chojin	RISE 105	Tokyo, Japan	Decision (Unanimous)	3	3:00
2014-12-29	Loss	(Japan) Koichi	Blade 1	Tokyo, Japan	Decision (Unanimous)	3	3:00
2014-11-16	Win	(Japan) Ryo Takigawa	RISE 102	Tokyo, Japan	KO (Low Kick)	2	1:55
2014-07-12	Loss	(Netherlands) Murat Aygün	RISE 100 -Blade 0-	Ota, Tokyo, Japan	KO	1	0:42
2014-03-22	Loss	(France) Nicolas Wamba	11th Trophee de l’Ephebe	Agde, France	TKO (Referee Stop.)	2	
For WKN Kickboxing Super Heavyweight World Championship.
2014-01-25	Loss	(Japan) Hiromi Amada	RISE 97	Tokyo, Japan	Decision (Unanimous)	3	3:00
2013-09-13	NC	(Japan) Hiromi Amada	RISE 95	Tokyo, Japan	NC (Originally UD Loss)	3	3:00
2013-07-20	Win	(Brazil) Jairo Kusunoki	RISE 94	Tokyo, Japan	Decision (Unanimous)	3	3:00
2012-12-31	Loss	(Turkey) Gokhan Saki	Glory 4: Tokyo - 2012 Heavyweight Grand Slam Tournament, First Round	Saitama, Japan	TKO (punches and left high kick)	1	1:06
2012-10-25	Loss	(Japan) Kengo Shimizu	RISE 90	Japan	KO (Head Kick)	3	1:30
For vacant RISE Heavyweight 100+ kg title.
2012-09-02	Win	(Japan) Takeshige Hayashi	Big Bang 10	Kōtō, Tokyo, Japan	TKO	2	1:00
2012-05-02	Loss	(Japan) Kengo Shimizu	RISE 88	Japan	KO (Knee to body)	1	1:30
2012-03-23	Win	(Japan) Eduardo Sakamoto	RISE 87	Tokyo, Japan	TKO (referee stoppage)	3	1:29
2011-11-23	Loss	(India) Singh Jaideep	RISE 85: RISE Heavyweight Tournament 2011, Semi Finals	Tokyo, Japan	KO (Knees)	1	1:39
2011-11-23	Win	(United States) Mighty Mo	RISE 85: RISE Heavyweight Tournament 2011, Quarter Finals	Tokyo, Japan	KO (knee)	3	2:49
2011-09-23	Win	(Ivory Coast) Bernard Ackah	RISE 83	Tokyo, Japan	KO	3	
2011-07-23	Loss	(Japan) Makoto Uehara	RISE 80	Tokyo, Japan	KO (Right Hook)	2	2:42
For vacant RISE Heavyweight title.
2011-03-25	Win	(South Korea) Son Min-Ho	K-King Heavyweight Tournament, Final	Seoul, Korea	Decision	3	3:00
Wins K-King Heavyweight Tournament Title.
2011-03-25	Win	(Germany) Air Sankoku	K-King Heavyweight Tournament, Semi Finals	Seoul, Korea	TKO	2	
2011-03-25	Win	(South Korea) Lee Sanmoku	K-King Heavyweight Tournament, Quarter Finals	Seoul, Korea	KO (Low Kicks)	2	
2011-02-27	Win	(Japan) Yasunari Hasegawa	RISE 74	Japan	KO (Head Kick)	3	2:40
2010-12-19	Loss	(Japan) Makoto Uehara	RISE 73	Tokyo, Japan	Decision (Majority)	3	3:00
2010-10-03	Win	(Japan) Atsushi	RISE 71	Tokyo, Japan	Decision (Unanimous)	3	3:00
2010-07-31	Win	(Japan) Hidekazu Kimura	RISE 68	Tokyo, Japan	KO (Towel Thrown)	3	1:39
Rising Rookies Cup Winner.
2010-01-24	Win	(Japan) Hiroshi Yoshizawa	RISE 61	Tokyo, Japan	KO	2	2:25
2009-11-08	Win	(Japan) Kazuki Nojiri	M-1 Freshmans vol.4	Japan	Decision (Unanimous)	3	3:00
Legend: Win Loss Draw/No contest Notes
