= Barrington Patterson =

English kickboxer and mixed martial arts fighter (1965–2022)

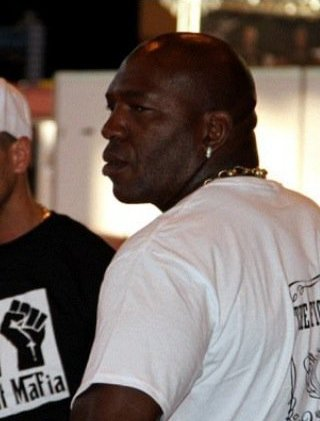
- Born: Barrington Renford Patterson; 25 August 1965; Burton on Trent, England
- Died: 22 March 2022 (aged 56); Birmingham, England
- Other names: One Eye Baz, Zulu Warrior
- Years active: 1991–2008
- Barrington Patterson's voice Published 15 December 2019

Barrington Renford Patterson (25 August 1965 – 22 March 2022) was an English kickboxer and mixed martial artist. At 18 stone (250 lb; 110 kg), he competed in the super heavyweight division and once fought for a world International Kickboxing Federation Kickboxing Championship.

== Biography ==
As a child Patterson was blinded in one eye through an accident, when his sister threw a can at him. This later earned him the name "One Eye Baz". In the early years of his life while growing up in the tough streets of Handsworth, Birmingham, Patterson adopted a criminal lifestyle with an addiction to violence; this was during the early 1980s, when relationships between ethnic communities in the inner cities and the police force were tense. Patterson was involved in the 1980s Handsworth riots as a looter.

In 2006, Patterson was featured in the television documentary The Real Football Factories, broadcast on Bravo. In 2008 a full episode of Danny Dyer's Deadliest men series was based on Patterson's life around Coventry, hosted by British actor Danny Dyer, in which he described Patterson as one of the most intimidating individuals he had ever met. The filming was built up towards his retirement MMA bout against Bob Schrijber and later broadcast on Bravo, Sky and Virgin Media channels.

After retiring, Patterson continued training himself and coaching others, including German MMA fighter Nordin Asrih and members of the Team Pride Gym of Germany, as well as former England Test cricketer, Ian Bell. Patterson was based in the West Midlands, where he also headed the toughest doors of Coventry's clubland and had a security business with staff working for him in Coventry and surrounding areas.

Patterson's autobiography One-eyed Baz was published in 2010 by Pennant Books. The book has attracted positive reviews on Amazon.

=== Kickboxing ===
During his active years as a professional kickboxer Patterson achieved many awards for fighting all across the globe, including Japan and the USA. Patterson fought Dennis Alexio for the VACANT International Kickboxing Federation (IKF) World title in 1997, but lost by KO. Within his career of over 60 fights, notable opponents Patterson has fought against include former heavyweight WBC boxing world champion Vitali Klitschko and Dennis Alexio.

=== Mixed martial arts ===
In October 1999, Patterson made his debut in mixed martial arts (MMA) at an It's Showtime event.

In 2005, at the Cage Warriors Fighting Championship event at Coventry's SkyDome Arena Patterson fought Marc Emmanuel and was defeated in the first round. The result outraged the crowd, which was rumoured to include his fellow Zulu warrior members, and resulted in a riot that forced the police to end the event. A total of 3,000 spectators were evacuated from the SkyDome Arena.

After a total of seven fights, Patterson announced that he would retire, although he would do one last MMA bout, which was to take place in Rotterdam, Holland, at the "KOE - Tough was Not Enough" event on 5 October 2008 against Dutch and former pride fighter Bob Schrijber. Patterson won the fight after a judges' decision result, winning the W.I.P.U. "King of the Ring" veterans' title.

=== Death ===
Patterson died of a heart attack on 22 March 2022, at the age of 56.

== Titles ==
MMA

- 2008 W.I.P.U. "King of the Ring" MMA Veterans title +103 kg

Kickboxing

- 1996 W.A.K.O. European Championships in Belgrade, Serbia & Montenegro (bronze) +91 kg (Full-Contact)

== Mixed martial arts record ==
Professional record breakdown
8 matches	4 wins	4 losses
By knockout	2	3
By submission	1	1
By decision	1	0
Draws	0	

Res.	Record	Opponent	Method	Event	Date	Round	Time	Location	Notes
Win	4-4	(Netherlands) Bob Schrijber	Decision (unanimous)		5 October 2008	2	5:00	Rotterdam, Netherlands	Wins W.I.P.U. "King of the Ring" MMA veterans title +103 kg
Loss	3-4	(France) Marc Emmanuel	KO (punch)		21 May 2005	1	4:27	Coventry, England	
Loss	3-3	(Netherlands) Dave Dalgliesh	KO	It's Showtime 2004 Amsterdam	20 May 2004	2	N/A	Amsterdam, Netherlands	
Loss	3-2	(Netherlands) Dick Vrij	KO (punch)	It's Showtime 2003 Amsterdam	8 June 2003	2	1:47	Amsterdam, Netherlands	
Loss	3-1	(Netherlands) Joop Kasteel	Submission (side choke)	It's Showtime – As Usual / Battle Time	29 September 2002	1	3:43	Haarlem, Netherlands	
Win	3-0	(Netherlands) Hans Nijman	KO (punches)	It's Showtime - Original	21 October 2001	1	1:47	Haarlem, Netherlands	
Win	2-0	(Russia) Stanislav Nuschik	Submission (smother choke)	It's Showtime - Exclusive	22 October 2000	2	2:30	Haarlem, Netherlands	
Win	1-0	(Netherlands) Sander MacKilljan	KO (punch)	It's Showtime - It's Showtime	24 October 1999	1	2:51	Haarlem, Netherlands	
