= Karyn Turner =

American martial art expert

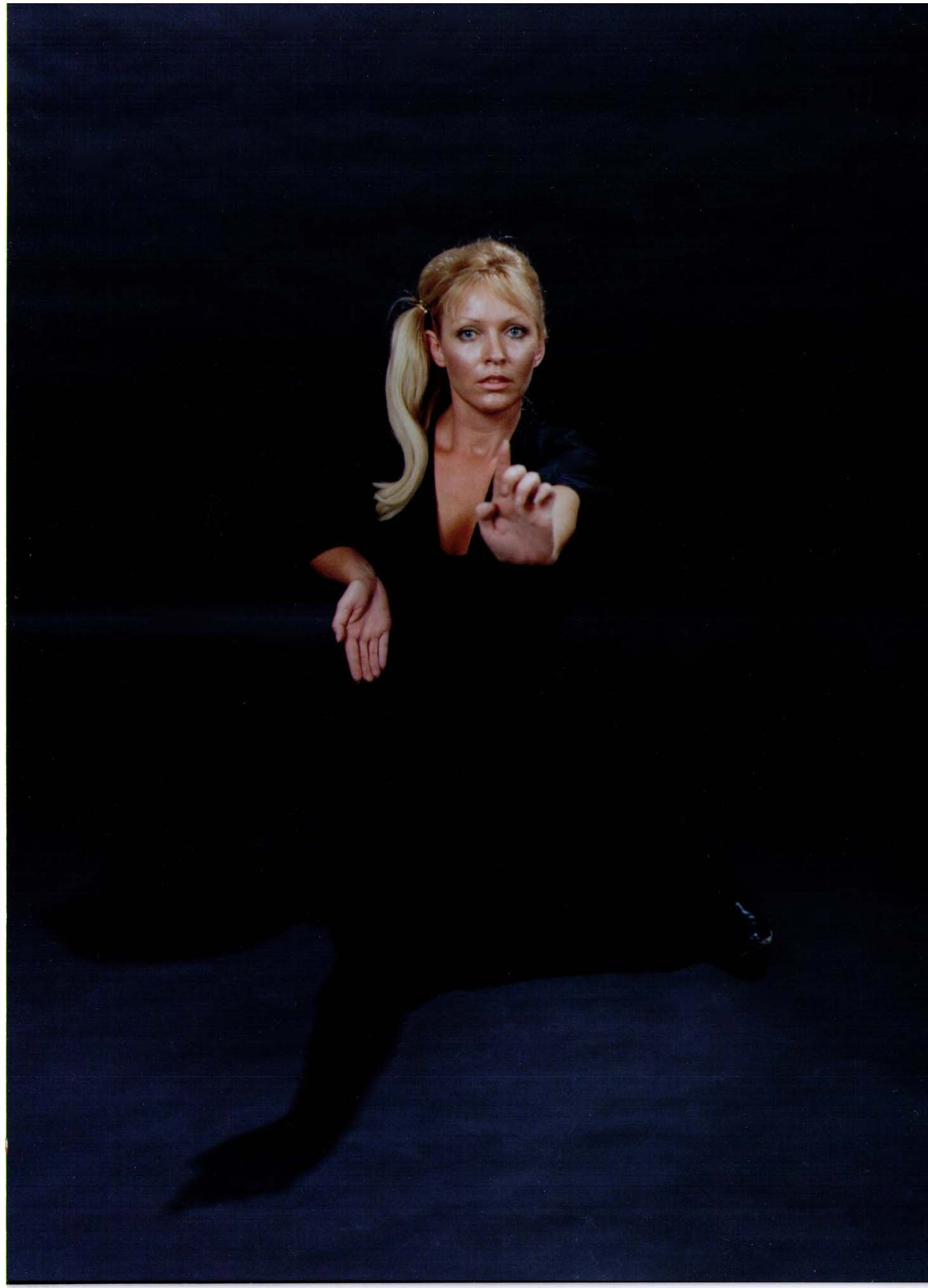
Karyn Turner, circa 1977

Karyn Turner (born 1946) is an American martial arts expert who has been variously known as “The Queen of Kata”, “First Lady of Kung Fu”, and “The Mother of U.S. Kickboxing”. Named as the “most outstanding woman in the history of martial arts” by Black Belt Magazine in 1978, she was the first woman to take a double victory in both fighting (kumite) and form (kata) in the International Women’s Karate Championship, a feat she accomplished in 1976. She was the first woman to enter men's divisions at the World Championships in kata and weapons (steel whip), and to become World Champion in the men's division in both. At the peak of her career in 1977, she entered twenty-three tournaments and swept three divisions, including men’s weapons kata. In 1990, Turner was the first woman in history to be nominated into the Black Belt Hall of Fame as “Competitor of the Year”, the same year she was selected by Black Belt Magazine as their “Woman of the Year”. In 2009, she was inducted into the Martial Arts History Museum “Hall of Fame”.

Born in Lyons, Kansas, Turner graduated from Westminster High School in Westminster, Colorado in 1963. At the age of 19, she began training in tae kwon do, before switching to kung fu, specifically the wun hop kune do technique taught by Al and Malia Dacascos. She began competing in official events in 1975 and retired from formal competition in 1979, at which point she formed the “Hard Knocks” troupe demonstration team, which performed for three years. Upon her retirement from competition, she also entered the field of promoting, starting her own promotional firm, Superfights, Inc. in 1979.

As President of Superfights, Inc., and serving on the executive board of the Professional Karate Association (PKA), Turner was an innovator in bringing mixed martial arts to cable television, promoting kickboxing’s first pay-per-view event, Superfights, on ESPN in 1982, and securing kickboxing’s first major sponsor with the Adolph Coors Brewing Company in that same year. Eventually, frustrated with the small percentage of TV and promotion revenue’s shared with promoters and fighters, Turner led a revolt by ex-PKA promoters to found a new association and to wrest control of the sport away from the PKA. The nascent Promoter’s Association, started in 1985 in Denver, became the International Sport Karate Association, and Turner served as its first Commissioner. Turner retired from active promotion in 1991.

Turner published “Secrets of Championship Karate” with Mark Van Schuyver in 1991.
