= Makoto Uehara =

Japanese kickboxer

- Born: November 14, 1984 (age 41); Tokyo, Japan
- Native name: 上原 誠
- Nationality: Japanese
- Height: 1.82 m (5 ft 11 1/2 in)
- Weight: 90.3 kg (199 lb; 14.22 st)
- Division: Heavyweight
- Reach: 76.0 in (193 cm)
- Style: Shidōkan Karate
- Team: Shidokan Murakamijuku
- Years active: 2008–present

Kickboxing record
- Total: 33
- Wins: 23
- By knockout: 13
- Losses: 9
- By knockout: 5
- Draws: 1
- Last updated on: December 21, 2013

Makoto Uehara (Japanese: 上原 誠; born November 14, 1984) is a Japanese Shidokan Karateka and heavyweight kickboxer competing in K-1. He is the former RISE Heavyweight and Light Heavyweight champion.

== Biography and career ==
He faced Hiromi Amada at the K-1 World Grand Prix 2012 in Tokyo final 16 on October 14, 2012 and won via unanimous decision.

Despite qualifying for the K-1 World Grand Prix 2012 Final, Uehara was left out in the cold when the event rolled around and was replaced by the higher-ranked Pavel Zhuravlev.

Uehara defeated Kengo Shimizu by way of split decision at RISE 92 in Tokyo on March 17, 2013 to win the RISE 90 kg title.

He was set to fight Dustin Jacoby at Glory 12: New York - Lightweight World Championship Tournament in New York City on November 23, 2013 but the match was switched to Glory 13: Tokyo - Welterweight World Championship Tournament in Tokyo, Japan on December 21, 2013. He defeated Jacoby by split decision.

== Titles ==
- 2013 RISE 90 kg champion
- 2011 RISE Heavyweight Tournament runner up
- 2011 RISE Heavyweight champion
- 31st Shidokan Karate Strong Open Tournament champion

== Kickboxing record ==
Kickboxing Record
23 Wins (13 KO's, 8 decisions), 9 Losses, 1 Draw
Date	Result	Opponent	Event	Location	Method	Round	Time	Record
2018-09-24	Loss	(Morocco) Boubaker El Bakouri	K-1 World GP 2018: inaugural Cruiserweight Championship Tournament, Quarter Finals	Japan	KO (Left Jab)	1	1:05	23-9-1
2018-06-17	Loss	(Japan) Hisaki Kato	K-1 World GP 2018: 2nd Featherweight Championship Tournament	Saitama, Japan	Extra Round Decision (Split)	4	3:00	23-8-1
2017-11-23	Loss	(Croatia) Antonio Plazibat	K-1 World GP 2017 Heavyweight Championship Tournament, Semi Finals	Saitama, Japan	KO (Flying Knee)	1		21-7-1
2017-11-23	Win	(France) Pacome Assi	K-1 World GP 2017 Heavyweight Championship Tournament, Quarter Finals	Saitama, Japan	KO (Left Uppercut)	1	2:30	21-6-1
2017-02-26	Loss	(Morocco) Ibrahim El Bouni	K-1 World GP 2017 Lightweight Championship Tournament	Tokyo, Japan	KO (Left hook)	2		20-6-1
2016-09-19	Win	(Japan) Koichi	K-1 World GP 2016 -60kg World Tournament	Tokyo, Japan	Decision (Unanimous)	3	3:00	20-5-1
2016-06-24	Win	(Japan) Tsutomu Takahagi	K-1 World GP 2016 -65kg World Tournament	Tokyo, Japan	TKO (Strikes)	1	0:32	19-5-1
2016-03-04	Win	(Japan) Nori	K-1 World GP 2016 -65kg Japan Tournament	Tokyo, Japan	KO (Strikes)	1	2:06	18-5-1
2014-12-29	Loss	(Azerbaijan) Zabit Samedov	Blade 1	Tokyo, Japan	Extra Round Decision	4	3:00	17-5-1
2014-07-12	Win	(Croatia) Zelg Galešić	RISE 100	Tokyo, Japan	KO (Right Hook)	1	1:25	17-4-1
2013-12-21	Win	(United States) Dustin Jacoby	Glory 13: Tokyo	Tokyo, Japan	Decision (Split)	3	3:00	16-4-1
2013-09-13	Draw	(South Korea) Kim Nae Chul	RISE 95	Tokyo, Japan	Draw (Majority)	4	3:00	15-4-1
2013-03-17	Win	(Japan) Kengo Shimizu	RISE 92	Tokyo, Japan	Decision (Split)	3	3:00	15-4
Wins RISE 90 kg title.
2012-10-14	Win	(Japan) Hiromi Amada	K-1 World Grand Prix 2012 in Tokyo final 16, First Round	Tokyo, Japan	Decision (Unanimous)	3	3:00	14-4
2012-06-02	Win	(United States) Crafton Wallace	RISE 88	Tokyo, Japan	TKO (Strikes)	2	2:27	13-4
2012-03-23	Win	(China) Won Jingan	RISE 87	Tokyo, Japan	KO (Right Low Kick	1	0:22	12-4
2011-11-23	Loss	(India) Singh Jaideep	RISE 85: Heavyweight Tournament 2011, Final	Tokyo, Japan	KO (Strikes)	1	0:38	11-4
Fight was for the RISE Heavyweight Tournament 2011 title.
2011-11-23	Win	(Czech Republic) Jan Soukup	RISE 85: Heavyweight Tournament 2011, Semi Finals	Tokyo, Japan	Ext. R Decision (Unanimous)	4	3:00	11-3
2011-11-23	Win	(Germany) Stefan Leko	RISE 85: Heavyweight Tournament 2011, Quarter Finals	Tokyo, Japan	Decision (Unanimous)	3	3:00	10-3
2011-07-23	Win	(Japan) Raoumaru	RISE 80	Tokyo, Japan	KO (Right Hook)	2	2:42	9-3
Wins vacant RISE Heavyweight title.
2011-02-27	Win	(Japan) Igifan	RISE 74	Tokyo, Japan	KO (Right Low Kick)	1	2:14	8-3
2010-12-19	Win	(Japan) Raoumaru	RISE 73	Tokyo, Japan	Decision (Majority)	3	3:00	7-3
2010-07-31	Win	(Japan) Kengo Shimizu	RISE 68	Tokyo, Japan	KO (Left High Kick)	3	1:24	6-3
2010-04-03	Loss	(Japan) Tsutomu Takahagi	K-1 World Grand Prix 2010 in Yokohama	Yokohama, Japan	Decision (Majority)	3	3:00	5-3
2009-12-05	Loss	(India) Singh Jaideep	K-1 World Grand Prix 2009 Final	Yokohama, Japan	KO (Right Hook)	2	1:36	5-2
2009-07-18	Loss	(Japan) Hiromi Amada	Heat 10	Japan	Decision (Unanimous)	3	3:00	5-1
2009-03-28	Win	(Japan) Takeshi Onda	Heat 9	Japan	KO (Left Hook)	Ex. R	N/A	5-0
2008-12-14	Win	(China) Sunwu	Heat 8	Japan	TKO (Corner Stoppage)	2	1:10	4-0
2008-07-13	Win	(South Korea) Yong Soo Park	K-1 World Grand Prix 2008 in Taipei	Taipei, Taiwan	KO (Left Hook)	Ex. R	1:26	3-0
2008-04-20	Win	(Japan) Hideo Sawada	K-1 League Trial Project	Japan	Decision (Unanimous)	3	3:00	2-0
2008-01-14	Win	(Japan) Ryuhei Takahashi		Japan	KO (Strikes)	2	1:26	1-0
Legend: Win Loss Draw/No contest Notes

== See also ==
- List of male kickboxers
- List of K-1 Events
