= Kengo Shimizu =

Japanese kickboxer (born 1983)

- Born: Kengo Shimizu; November 17, 1983 (age 42); Japan
- Other names: Ken-Shimu
- Nationality: Japanese
- Height: 1.86 m (6 ft 1 in)
- Weight: 85 kg (187 lb; 13 st 5 lb)
- Division: Middleweight; Light heavyweight Heavyweight
- Style: Kyokushinkaikan
- Stance: Orthodox
- Fighting out of: Japan
- Team: Silver Ax
- Trainer: Jayson Vemoa
- Rank: Black belt Kyokushin kaikan

Kickboxing record
- Total: 35
- Wins: 28
- By knockout: 22
- Losses: 7
- By knockout: 4
- Last updated on: November 27, 2020

Kengo Shimizu (清水 賢吾, Shimizu Kengo; born on November 17, 1983), is a Japanese middleweight kickboxer competing in RISE. He is the former SHOOTBOXING and RISE Heavyweight champion.

== Kyokushin Karate career ==
Started doing Kyokushin Karate at the age of 16, joining Kyokushin Kaikan Tokyo Itabashi Dojo. Achieved last 8 at 20th All Japan Weight Category Tournament at the age of 19. His biggest achievement was 2nd place at 24th All Japan Weight Category Tournament, where he fought as heavyweight and lost to Osamu Shiojima. That qualified him for 9th World Open Tournament, but he didn't make remarkable achievement.

== Kickboxing career ==
He made pro debut in 2006, fighting mostly in RISE promotion. In 2012, with a promotion record of 8–1, he rematched Raoumaru for vacant RISE Heavyweight title. Shimizu dominated the fight, just like the first fight, this time scoring 3rd-round knockout with a high kick.

Next year he dropped weight and fought for vacant RISE Light Heavyweight title against, making a revanche against Makoto Uehara at RISE 92 in Tokyo, Japan. Uehara got the split decision victory, with a point deduction from Shimizu in the second.

He dropped weight again and won Road to Glory Japan -85 kg tournament on March 3, 2013, defeating Yuki Niimura and Magnum Sakai by decisions on the same night and joined Glory's middleweight division.

He made Glory debut on September 28, 2013, replacing Steve Wakeling and joining Glory 10: Los Angeles - Middleweight World Championship Tournament. He lost in semi finals to eventual winner Joe Schilling by unanimous decision.

He was scheduled to fight Hiromi Amada at RISE 99. He won the fight by a third round head kick KO.

Shimizu participated in the 2015 Shootboxing Heavyweight tournament. He scored a first-round knockout of Shakar Peterson in the semifinals. He won the final against Nangoku Chojin by a first-round KO as well.

He successfully defended his RISE Heavyweight title with a unanimous decision win against Badr Ferdaous.

== Titles and achievements ==
- Kickboxing
  - 2015 Shootboxing Heavyweight Tournament Winner
  - 2013 Road to Glory Japan 85kg Tournament Winner
  - 2012 RISE Heavyweight champion +100 kg (1 Title Def.)
- Kyokushin Karate – IKO 1
  - 2011 10th World Open Tournament, Participated
  - 2011 28th All Japan Weight Category Tournament, heavyweight, Last 8
  - 2007 9th World Open Tournament, Participated
  - 2007 24th All Japan Weight Category Tournament, heavyweight (silver)
  - 2005 22nd All Japan Weight Category Tournament, heavyweight, Last 8
  - 2004 21st All Japan Weight Category Tournament, heavyweight, Last 8
  - 2003 20th All Japan Weight Category Tournament, Last 8

== Kickboxing record ==
Professional kickboxing record
28 Wins (22 (T)KO's, 6 Decisions), 7 Losses (2 (T)KO's, 3 Decisions)
Date	Result	Opponent	Event	Location	Method	Round	Time	Record
2018-11-17	Loss	(United States) Mighty Mo	RISE 129	Tokyo, Japan	TKO (Punches)	3	0:55	28–7
2018-09-16	Win	(Netherlands) Badr Ferdaous	RISE 127	Tokyo, Japan	Decision (Unanimous)	3	3:00	28–6
Retains RISE Heavyweight title.
2018-06-17	Loss	(Netherlands) Badr Ferdaous	RISE 125	Tokyo, Japan	TKO (Punches)	1	2:52	27–6
2018-03-24	Win	(Spain) David Trallero	RISE 123	Tokyo, Japan	KO (Left hook)	2	1:27	27–5
2017-11-22	Win	(Japan) Hiromitsu Miura	Shoot Boxing GROUND ZERO TOKYO 2017	Tokyo, Japan	KO (Left hook)	2	1:40	26–5
2017-05-20	Win	(Korea) Jae Gun Yang	RISE 117	Tokyo, Japan	KO (Right straight)	3	0:14	25–5
2016-03-26	Win	(Portugal) Luis Morais	RISE 110	Tokyo, Japan	Extra round decision (Unanimous)	4	3:00	24–5
2015-12-01	Win	(Japan) Nangoku Chojin	Shoot Boxing GROUND ZERO TOKYO 2015, Final	Tokyo, Japan	KO	1	1:09	23–5
Wins the Shootboxing Heavyweight Tournament.
2015-12-01	Win	(Brazil) Shakar Peterson	Shoot Boxing GROUND ZERO TOKYO 2015, Semi Finals	Tokyo, Japan	KO	1	1:03	22–5
2015-05-31	Win	(United States) Alex Roberts	RISE 105 (-100 kg)	Tokyo, Japan	Decision (Split)	3	3:00	21–5
2015-01-24	Win	(Japan) Yuji Sakuragi	RISE 103 (-92 kg)	Tokyo, Japan	TKO (3 Knockdowns)	1	2:25	20–5
2014-11-16	Win	(South Korea) Kim Hyung Min	RISE 102	Tokyo, Japan	KO (Left hook)	2	1:03	19–5
2014-07-12	Loss	(Japan) Magnum Sakai	RISE 100 -Blade 0- (-95 kg)	Ota, Tokyo, Japan	Decision (Unanimous)	3	3:00	18–5
2014-04-29	Win	(Japan) Hiromi Amada	RISE 99	Tokyo, Japan	KO (High kick)	3	1:47	18-4
Retains RISE Heavyweight title.
2014-01-25	Win	(Japan) Takikawa Ryou	RISE 97	Tokyo, Japan	KO (Knee)	2	1:36	17-4
2013-09-28	Loss	(United States) Joe Schilling	Glory 10: Los Angeles – Middleweight World Championship Tournament, Semi Finals	Ontario, California, US	Decision (Unanimous)	3	3:00	16-4
2013-03-03	Win	(Japan) Magnum Sakai	Road to Glory Japan 85 kg Tournament, Final	Tokyo, Japan	Decision (Majority)	3	3:00	16-3
Wins the Road to Glory Japan 85kg Tournament.
2013-03-03	Win	(Japan) Yuki Niimura	Road to Glory Japan 85 kg Tournament, Semi Finals	Tokyo, Japan	Decision (Unanimous)	3	3:00	15-3
2013-03-17	Loss	(Japan) Makoto Uehara	RISE 92	Tokyo, Japan	Decision (Split)	3	3:00	14-3
For RISE Light Heavyweight -90 kg title.
2012-10-25	Win	(Japan) Raoumaru	RISE 90	Japan	KO (Head kick)	3	1:30	14-2
Wins vacant RISE Heavyweight title.
2012-05-02	Win	(Japan) Raoumaru	RISE 88	Japan	KO (Knee to body)	1	1:30	13-2
2012-03-24	Win	(Japan) Hidekazu Kimura	RISE 87	Japan	Decision (Unanimous)	3	3:00	12-2
2012-01-28	Win	(Japan) Nori	RISE 86	Japan	KO (Head kick)	1	1:54	11-2
2011-02-27	Win	(Japan) Tsutomu Takahagi	RISE 74	Japan	KO (Head kick)	3	2:40	10-2
2010-12-19	Win	(Japan) Ismael Aoki	RISE 73R	Japan	KO	1	1:50	9-2
2010-11-23	Win	(Japan) Shunsuke Inoue	S-Cup World Tournament Final 2010, Super fight	Japan	KO (Head kick)	3	2:40	8-2
2010-07-31	Loss	(Japan) Makoto Uehara	RISE 68	Tokyo, Japan	KO (Left high kick)	3	1:24	7-2
2010-05-16	Win	(Japan) Tanya Mainochi	RISE 65	Japan	KO （Right straight）	1	2:50	7-1
2010-01-24	Win	(Japan) Hukuda Yuuhei	RISE 61	Japan	KO (Knee)	1	2:07	6-1
2009-10-04	Win	(Japan) Ikeno Age	RISE 59	Japan	TKO (3 Knockdowns)	2	2:01	5-1
2009-08-11	Win	(Japan) Shinkyu Kawano	K-1 World Grand Prix 2009 in Tokyo Final 16 Qualifying GP	Tokyo, Japan	KO (Knee)	1	0:34	4-1
2009-06-01	Win	(Japan) Iga Koji	武志道-bushido-其の参	Japan	KO (Right hook)	1		3-1
2008-12-07	Loss	(Brazil) Peterson Shakaru	Trial League	Japan	KO (Doctor stoppage)	2		2-1
2008-10-12	Win	(Netherlands) Nasser Amadian	Trial League	Japan	KO (Right straight)	2	1:30	2-0
2006-03-12	Win	(Japan) Nobuhiro Tsurumaki	Trial League	Japan	TKO (3 Knockdowns)	1	2:42	1-0
Legend: Win Loss Draw/No contest Notes

== See also ==
- List of male kickboxers
