= Trojan Warrior =

2002 Australian comedy film

- Directed by: Salik Silverstein
- Written by: Headley Gritter
- Produced by: David Teitelbaum; Murray Sestak
- Starring: Stan Longinidis; Arthur Angel; John Brumpton
- Release date: 8 August 2002
- Running time: 100 minutes
- Country: Australia
- Language: English

Trojan Warrior is a 2002 Australian comedy film directed by Salik Silverstein and starring Stan Longinidis. The film was released in the United States as Kick to the Head.

== Synopsis ==
Ajax (Stan ‘The Man’ Longinidis), was once an undercover operative, trying to infiltrate the business dealings of local gangsters, but was wronged by police in the process. When his cousin Theo (Arthur Angel), rats out the local mob boss, 'one-man-army' Ajax (Stan ‘The Man’ Longinidis), must rescue and protect him from the Melbourne underworld, who want to prevent Theo from testifying at a trial that would put them away for a very long time. Ajax must also battle his arch enemy, Super Don Armande Poroni in the process.

== Cast ==
- Stan Longinidis as Ajax
- Arthur Angel as Theo
- John Brumpton as Saunders
- Stephen Yates as Johnston
- Mark 'Jacko' Jackson as Zork
- Terry Lim as Hng Sng
- Sam Kay as Roach
- Roland Dantes as Tanng
- Ziggy Crowe as Soo
- Henry Maas as Armande Poroni
- Danielle Barht as Patti
- Mark Brandon Read as Erik Bana
- George Longinidis as Hamad
- Dermott Brereton as Kid Callaghan
- Julianne Armstrong as Maggie / Waitress
- John Barresi as Jimmy
- Big Bad Ralph as Abbu Abubu
- Frank Di Ciero as Mint Guard
- John Fox as Reynard
- Marnie Franklin as Roberta / Hilary
- Gabriel Gate as Gerard Oeuf
- Mick Gauci as Stinky
- Doug Hawkins as Johnny Sphincter
- Professor Yoland Lim as Professor Ho
- Greg Matthews as Rain Forest
- Nicholas Polites as Stav
- Naomi Robson as Leslie Rowlands
- Teresa Svoronos as Teresa Poroni
- Wilbur Wilde as Archie
- Ross Wilson as Serendipity
- Frank Deaney as Bhuggetti
- Mark Fong as Rim
- Slash as Slash

== Box office ==
Trojan Warrior grossed $88,059 at the box office in Australia.

== See also ==
- Cinema of Australia
