= Hiromi Amada =

Japanese kickboxer (born 1973)

- Born: May 10, 1973 (age 53); Takasaki, Gunma, Japan
- Native name: 天田ヒロミ
- Nationality: (Japan) Japanese
- Height: 1.85 m (6 ft 1 in)
- Weight: 105 kg (231 lb; 16.5 st)
- Division: Heavyweight
- Style: Boxing, Kickboxing
- Team: TENKA 510
- Years active: 17 (1999–2016)

Kickboxing record
- Total: 77
- Wins: 46
- By knockout: 23
- Losses: 27
- By knockout: 14
- Draws: 3
- No contests: 1

Amateur record
- Total: 102
- Wins: 86
- Losses: 16
- Last updated on: April 20, 2014

Hiromi Amada
Medal record

Representing Japan

Men's Amateur boxing

All Japan Championships
Gold medal – first place	1996	Light middleweight

National Athletic Meet
Gold medal – first place	Fukushima 1996	Light middleweight

Hiromi Amada (Japanese: 天田 ヒロミ; born May 10, 1973) is a retired Japanese heavyweight kickboxer and boxer from Gunma, Japan. A staple in the K-1 heavyweight division from 1999 to 2007, the company considered him one of its most talented Japanese fighters, second only to Musashi. He is also the first-ever HEAT Heavyweight Kickboxing Champion and holds notable victories over Freddy Kemayo, Makoto Uehara, and Rene Rooze.

== Early life ==
Amada began practicing boxing as a teenager while attending Maebashi Ikuei High School, and won the national junior championship prior to graduation. He then attended Chuo University and served as captain of the school's boxing club, all the while competing at the amateur level. In 1996, he won the All Japan Amateur Boxing Championships.

== Career ==
=== K-1 ===
The K-1 kickboxing organization scouted Amada before he even graduated from university. He made his professional debut on March 22, 1999, at K-1 The Challenge '99, earning a unanimous decision victory over the larger John Wyatt. Eschewing kicks and utilizing a boxing-based style, Amada achieved a 5-0 winning streak en route to reaching the finals of his first tournament – the K-1 Spirits '99. He fought the world champion Musashi, who delivered him his first defeat via unanimous decision.

Amada spent the following five years falling short of substantial success. He entered the K-1 Spirits 2000, K-1 World Grand Prix 2000 in Fukuoka, and K-1 Survival 2003 Japan Grand Prix Final tournaments, only to be defeated in latter rounds. Nevertheless, he earned significant victories along the way. He knocked out the aggressive Dutch giant Rene Rooze at K-1 Rising 2002 and MMA champion Tom Erikson at K-1 Beast 2003. Then, he met Eric “Butterbean” Esch at K-1 Beast 2004 in Niigata and scored an upset over the world champion boxer. Esch continually taunted and baited his opponent, at one point dropping his gloves and absorbing several unguarded blows to the head. Despite this show of toughness, Amada – who had by then broadened his repertoire to include low kicks – peppered the American for three rounds while staying out of range of Esch's punches, leading to a unanimous decision victory.

On June 26, 2004, Amada finally acquired a tournament win by becoming the K-1 Beast 2004 in Shizuoka champion. The achievement brought him to the K-1 World Grand Prix 2004 Final Elimination, where he lost his chance of competing in the K-1 World Grand Prix 2004 Final to Ray Sefo via unanimous decision. Amada would in fact appear at the event, but in a reserve fight he lost to Jérôme Le Banner.

=== Departure from K-1 and later career ===
Amada remained with K-1 for the better part of three years following 2004, earning a victory over future world champion Freddy Kemayo in the process. However, the company suspended him following a 2007 incident wherein Amada allegedly assaulted a truck driver following a traffic incident in Tokyo. His last match for the organization prior to departure was a losing effort to Paul Slowinski at K-1 World Grand Prix 2007 in Amsterdam.

For the remainder of his career, Amada competed for a variety of organizations but found the most success in HEAT, a fledgling promotion which held all its matches in an octagonal cage. He entered a tournament to crown the company's first heavyweight kickboxing champion, and eventually emerged victorious with a KO win over Makoto Uehara at HEAT 10 on July 18, 2009. Amada reigned as champion for over 20 months, successfully defending his title twice before losing it at HEAT 22 to Fabiano Aoki. Amada consequently departed from HEAT and only fought for the company once more, unsuccessfully challenging Prince Ali for his old championship at HEAT 36.

Continuing in journeyman fashion, Amada competed for only one more title: the RISE Heavyweight Championship on April 29, 2014. Despite being 40 years old at the time – over a decade older than his opponent, Kengo Shimizu – Amada surprised the audience by being the more aggressive fighter, pushing in close with his signature boxing offense. By the third round, Shimizu's visible exhaustion contrasted with Amada's apparent vigor. Nevertheless, the younger champion landed a surprise kick to Amada's head which sent the challenger to the canvas and cost him the match.

Amada fought his last match to date on September 18, 2016, at the New Japan Kickboxing Association's Titans Neo 20 event, achieving a unanimous decision victory over Mauro Herrera.

== Personal life ==
From 2005 to 2007, in addition to his kickboxing career, Amada worked for a real estate company. His contract was canceled when the firm declared bankruptcy.

He has a wife who shares his first name; both are called Hiromi Amada. He also has a daughter and twin sons.

While a senior at Chuo University, he shared a dorm with basketball player Kenichi Sako.

In 2019, Amada was arrested in Aomori City for violating city ordinances.

== Titles ==
Kickboxing

- 2009 HEAT Heavyweight Kickboxing Champion
- K-1 Beast 2004 in Shizuoka Champion

Amateur boxing

- 1996 All Japan Amateur Boxing Champion
- 1996 National Athletic Meet at Fukushima Amateur Boxing Champion

== Kickboxing record ==
46 wins (23 KOs, 24 decisions), 27 losses, 3 draws, 1 NC
Date	Result	Record	Opponent	Event	Method	Round	Time
September 18, 2016	Win	46-27-3-1	(Argentina) Mauro Herrera	NJKF Titans Neo 20	Decision (unanimous)	3	3:00
December 19, 2015	Win	45-27-3-1	(Japan) Yuki Kudo	MAT Vol. 1	Decision (unanimous)	3	3:00
November 29, 2015	Loss	44-27-3-1	(Iran) Prince Ali	HEAT 36	TKO (corner stoppage)	1	1:15
Fight was for the HEAT Heavyweight Kickboxing Championship.
August 1, 2015	Loss	44-26-3-1	(Japan) KOICHI	BLADE 2	Decision (unanimous)	3	3:00
April 18, 2015	Loss	44-25-3-1	(Japan) Chojin Nangoku	Shoot Boxing 2015 - Act 2	Submission (front choke)	3	1:50
Fight was conducted under shoot boxing rules.
March 15, 2015	Win	44-24-3-1	(Japan) Ikeda Tsuyohiroshi	Chakuriki 1	TKO (punches)	2	1:41
January 31, 2015	Win	43-24-3-1	(Japan) Mr. Kamikaze	BUUDEN in Ishigakijima	Decision (unanimous)	3	3:00
December 13, 2014	Loss	42-24-3-1	(China) Zhang Chang	Samurai Conqueror: China Vs. Japan	Decision (unanimous)	5	3:00
September 13, 2014	Loss	42-23-3-1	(Japan) Akira Matsumoto	NJKF Titans Neo 16	Decision (unanimous)	3	3:00
April 24, 2014	Loss	42-22-3-1	(Japan) Kengo Shimizu	RISE 99	KO (right high kick)	3	1:47
Fight was for the RISE Heavyweight Championship.
January 25, 2014	Win	42-21-3-1	(Japan) Raoumaru	RISE 97	Decision (unanimous)	3	3:00
November 17, 2013	Win	41-21-3-1	(Japan) Mr. Kamikaze	Legend 4	Decision (unanimous)	3	3:00
September 13, 2013	NC	40-21-3-1	(Japan) Raoumaru	RISE 95	No contest	3	3:00
Originally a loss for Amada, overturned to a no-contest.
June 9, 2013	Win	40-21-3	(Japan) Nojiri Kazuki	RISE 93	Decision (unanimous)	3	3:00
February 24, 2013	Win	39-21-3	(Japan) Tsutomu Takahagi	Big Bang 12	Decision (unanimous)	3	3:00
December 2, 2012	Win	38-21-3	(Japan) Tomohiko Hashimoto	Big Bang 11	KO	1	0:18
October 14, 2012	Loss	37–21–3	(Japan) Makoto Uehara	K-1 World Grand Prix 2012 in Tokyo final 16	Decision (unanimous)	3	3:00
September 2, 2012	Win	37-20-3	(United States) Alex Roberts	Big Bang 10	KO	2	1:07
July 14, 2012	Win	36-20-3	(Japan) Masayoshi Kakutani	IGF Genome 21	KO	1	2:03
June 3, 2012	Win	35-20-3	(Japan) Soichi Nishida	Big Bang 9	KO	1	1:24
April 8, 2012	Loss	34-20-3	(Brazil) Fabiano Aoki	HEAT 22	KO	2	1:39
Loses the HEAT Heavyweight Kickboxing Championship.
November 23, 2011	Loss	34-19-3	(India) Singh Jaideep	RISE 85 Heavyweight Tournament 2011	TKO (doctor stoppage)	2	2:59
September 2, 2011	Draw	34-18-3	(United States) Alex Roberts	NJKF Titans Neo X	Decision draw	3	3:00
July 23, 2011	Win	34-18-2	(Japan) Tsutomu Takahagi	RISE 80	Decision (unanimous)	3	3:00
March 13, 2011	Win	33-18-2	(Japan) Tatsufumi Tomihira	HEAT 17	Decision (unanimous)	3	3:00
Retains the HEAT Heavyweight Kickboxing Championship.
January 15, 2011	Win	32-18-2	(Japan) Magnum Sakai	MAJKF Break 8	Ext R. decision (unanimous)	4	3:00
December 1, 2010	Loss	31-18-2	(Japan) Koichi Watanabe	Fujiwara Festival 2010	Decision (unanimous)	3	3:00
Fight was for the WPMF Japanese Heavyweight Championship.
July 18, 2010	Win	31-17-2	(Korea) Bo Lam Moon	HEAT 14	TKO	1	1:43
Retains the HEAT Heavyweight Kickboxing Championship.
April 18, 2010	Win	30-17-2	(Japan) Toshio Matsumoto	NJKF Titans Neo VII	KO (left hook)	2	0:24
March 14, 2010	Win	29-17-2	(Japan) Makato	HEAT 13	TKO (3 knockdowns)	2	2:08
September 26, 2009	Win	28-17-2	(Nigeria) Emeka	HEAT 11	Decision (unanimous)	3	3:00
July 18, 2009	Win	27-17-2	(Japan) Makoto Uehara	HEAT 10	Decision (unanimous)	3	3:00
Wins the HEAT Heavyweight Kickboxing tournament. Becomes the inaugural HEAT Heavyweight Kickboxing Champion.
March 28, 2009	Win	26-17-2	(Korea) Bo Lam Moon	HEAT 9	Decision (unanimous)	3	3:00
Semifinal match in HEAT Heavyweight Kickboxing tournament.
December 14, 2008	Win	25-17-2	(Iran) Prince Ali	HEAT 8	TKO (corner stoppage)	3	2:23
Quarterfinal match in HEAT Heavyweight Kickboxing tournament.
September 16, 2008	Win	24-17-2	(Canada) Gary Goodridge	Gladiator International Friendship Rally	Decision (unanimous)	3	3:00
March 9, 2008	Loss	23-17-2	(Russia) Ruslan Karaev	NJKF Magnam 16	TKO (3 knockdowns/right knee)	3	2:06
May 23, 2007	Loss	23-16-2	(Australia) Paul Slowinski	K-1 World Grand Prix 2007 in Amsterdam	KO (left low kick)	1	1:50
April 22, 2007	Win	23-15-2	(United Kingdom) Will Riva	NJKF Titans Neo I	Decision (unanimous)	3	3:00
March 4, 2007	Loss	22-15-2	(Turkey) Gokhan Saki	K-1 World Grand Prix 2007 in Yokohama	TKO (corner stoppage)	2	3:00
July 30, 2006	Win	22-14-2	(France) Freddy Kemayo	K-1 World Grand Prix 2006 in Sapporo	Decision (unanimous)	3	3:00
April 28, 2006	Draw	21-14-2	(Thailand) Kaoklai Kaennorsing	NJKF Titans 3rd	Decision draw	3	3:00
May 14, 2005	Loss	21-14-1	(Japan) Tatsufumi Tomihira	K-1 World Grand Prix 2005 in Hiroshima	Ext R. decision (split)	4	3:00
December 4, 2004	Loss	21-13-1	(France) Jérôme Le Banner	K-1 World Grand Prix 2004 Final Reserve fight	KO (left low kick)	2	1:03
September 25, 2004	Loss	21-12-1	(New Zealand) Ray Sefo	K-1 World Grand Prix 2004 Final Elimination	Decision (unanimous)	3	3:00
Fails to qualify for the K-1 World Grand Prix 2004 Final, but will be invited as a reservist.
June 26, 2004	Win	21-11-1	(Japan) Nobu Hayashi	K-1 Beast 2004 in Shizuoka Finals	Decision (unanimous)	3	3:00
Wins the K-1 Beast 2004 in Shizuoka championship.
June 26, 2004	Win	20-11-1	(Japan) Tatsufumi Tomihira	K-1 Beast 2004 in Shizuoka semifinals	TKO (2 knockdowns/right hook)	3	0:58
June 26, 2004	Win	19-11-1	(Japan) Noboru Uchida	K-1 Beast 2004 in Shizuoka quarterfinals	Decision (unanimous)	3	3:00
March 14, 2004	Win	18-11-1	(United States) Eric Esch	K-1 Beast 2004 in Niigata	Decision (unanimous)	3	3:00
February 15, 2004	Win	17-11-1	(United States) Kimo Leopoldo	K-1 Burning 2004	TKO (3 knockdowns/left hook)	2	2:06
December 31, 2003	Loss	16-11-1	(Canada) Michael McDonald	Inoki Bom-Ba-Ye 2003	KO (right high kick)	2	0:46
November 3, 2003	Win	16-10-1	(Japan) Katsuyori Shibata	NJPW Yokohama Dead Out	KO (knee strike)	2	2:08
September 21, 2003	Loss	15-10-1	(Japan) Yusuke Fujimoto	K-1 Survival 2003 Japan Grand Prix Final semifinals	Decision (unanimous)	4	3:00
September 21, 2003	Win	15-9-1	(Japan) Tsuyoshi Nakasako	K-1 Survival 2003 Japan Grand Prix Final quarterfinals	Decision (unanimous)	4	3:00
June 29, 2003	Win	14-9-1	(Japan) Tsuyoshi	K-1 Beast II 2003	Decision (unanimous)	3	3:00
April 6, 2003	Win	13-9-1	(United States) Tom Erikson	K-1 Beast 2003	Ext. R. KO (right hook)	4	1:14
September 22, 2002	Loss	12-9-1	(Japan) Musashi	K-1 Andy Spirits Japan GP 2002 Final	Ext R. decision (unanimous)	4	3:00
April 21, 2002	Win	12-8-1	(Japan) Takeru	K-1 Burning 2002	TKO (3 knockdowns)	1	1:52
March 3, 2002	Loss	11-8-1	(France) Jérôme Le Banner	K-1 World Grand Prix 2002 in Nagoya	KO (right hook)	1	1:42
January 21, 2002	Win	11-7-1	(Netherlands) Rene Rooze	K-1 Rising 2002	KO (punch)	1	3:00
June 16, 2001	Loss	10-7-1	(New Zealand) Mark Hunt	K-1 World Grand Prix 2001 in Melbourne	KO (right hook)	1	2:52
January 30, 2001	Loss	10-6-1	(South Africa) Mike Bernardo	K-1 Rising 2001	Ext. R. TKO (corner stoppage)	4	1:32
November 1, 2000	Draw	10-5-1	(Japan) Toru Oishi	K-1 J-MAX 2000	Draw	5	3:00
October 9, 2000	Loss	10-5	(Croatia) Mirko Cro Cop	K-1 World Grand Prix 2000 in Fukuoka semifinals	Decision (unanimous)	3	3:00
October 9, 2000	Win	10-4	(Canada) Tomasz Kucharzewski	K-1 World Grand Prix 2000 in Fukuoka quarterfinals	KO (right hook)	1	1:49
July 7, 2000	Loss	9-4	(Japan) Musashi	K-1 Spirits 2000 Finals	Decision (unanimous)	3	3:00
Fight was for the K-1 Spirits 2000 championship.
July 7, 2000	Win	9-3	(China) Teng Jun	K-1 Spirits 2000 semifinals	Decision	3	2:17
July 7, 2000	Win	8-3	(Japan) Masashi Suzuki	K-1 Spirits 2000 quarterfinals	TKO (referee stoppage)	3	2:17
May 28, 2000	Win	7-3	(Japan) Masaaki Miyomoto	K-1 Survival 2000	KO	1	1:51
Qualifying match for the K-1 Spirits 2000 tournament.
March 19, 2000	Loss	6-3	(Croatia) Mirko Cro Cop	K-1 Burning 2000	Ext. R. KO (left hook)	4	2:51
January 25, 2000	Win	6-2	(Japan) Nobu Hayashi	K-1 Rising 2000	TKO (doctor stoppage)	3	0:50
October 2, 1999	Loss	5-2	(Switzerland) Andy Hug	K-1 World Grand Prix '99 opening round	TKO (3 knockdowns/right spinning back kick)	1	1:51
August 22, 1999	Loss	5-1	(Japan) Musashi	K-1 Spirits '99 finals	Decision (unanimous)	3	3:00
Fight was for the K-1 Spirits '99 championship.
August 22, 1999	Win	5-0	(China) Teng Jun	K-1 Spirits '99 semifinals	Decision (split)	3	3:00
August 22, 1999	Win	4-0	(Japan) Ryo Takigawa	K-1 Spirits '99 quarterfinals	TKO (2 knockdowns)	1	2:06
July 10, 1999	Win	3-0	(England) Chris Ballard	King of the Ring	TKO	1	
June 6, 1999	Win	2-0	(England) Simon Dore	K-1 Survival '99	TKO (referee stoppage)	3	1:55
March 22, 1999	Win	1-0	(England) John Wyatt	K-1 The Challenge '99	Decision (unanimous)	5	3:00

== Boxing record ==
Boxing record
1 win (0 KOs), 0 losses, 0 draws
Date	Result	Opponent	Event	Location	Method	Round	Time	Record
2010-08-25	Win	(Japan) Sudo ShinTakashi	Boxfight - First Impact	Tokyo, Japan	KO	2	1:36	1–0
Legend: Win Loss Draw/no contest Notes

== Mixed martial arts record ==
Professional MMA record
2 wins (2 (T)KO's), 0 losses
Date	Result	Opponent	Event	Location	Method	Round	Time	Record
2013-02-23	Win	(Japan) Shogun Okamoto	IGF 24	Tokyo, Japan	KO	3	0:17	2–0
2012-10-16	Win	(Japan) Yusuke Kawaguchi	IGF 23	Tokyo, Japan	KO	2	1:42	1–0
Legend: Win Loss Draw/no contest Notes

== See also ==
- List of K-1 Events
- List of male kickboxers
