= Derek Panza =

American boxer

- Born: Derek Panza; February 16, 1971 (age 55); New York, New York, U.S.
- Height: 6 ft 0 in (183 cm)
- Weight: 220 lb (100 kg; 15 st 10 lb)
- Division: Heavyweight
- Style: Boxing, Kickboxing, Karate
- Fighting out of: Huntington, New York, U.S.
- Team: Panza Kickboxing
- Trainer: Yoel Judah
- Years active: 16 (1995–present)

Kickboxing record
- Total: 23
- Wins: 22
- By knockout: 12
- Losses: 1
- Draws: 0

Other information
- Website: www.panzamma.com

Derek Panza (born February 16, 1971) is an American kickboxer and boxer from Queens, New York. He was the ISKA World Heavyweight Kickboxing Champion and is undefeated as a professional boxer with a record of 7-0. He currently trains fighters at Panza MMA, located inside world champion power lifter and bodybuilder Bev Francis' Powerhouse Gym in Syosset, New York.

== Biography and career ==
Panza was born in Queens New York. He started training in Shotokan Karate at the age of 8 and was promoted to Black Belt by the age of 14. In 1986 at the age of 15 he won first place in kumite at National Junior Karate Championships. Soon after Panza began to compete in the men's over 18 black belt fighting division. By the age of 19 Panza had won numerous national and international karate championships and was ranked as the #1 heavyweight by the Professional Karate League (PKL) and number #2 by the North American Sport Karate Association (NASKA). Panza fought in sport karate as a member of the United States Karate Team and Paul Mitchell Sport Karate Team.

At the age of 21 Panza began transitioning his martial arts career from sport karate to boxing and kickboxing. A year later Panza won the New York Metropolitan Boxing Championship in the super heavyweight division. A year after that he made his professional kickboxing debut with a 57-second KO victory.

In 1997, Panza won his first World Kickboxing Championship by Knocking out UFC Legend Pat Smith. he would go on to Capture the Prestigious ISKA World Heavyweight Kickboxing Championship with a Unanimous Decision win over England’s Simon Dore. Panza was also one of the original fighters that fought in the World Combat League, produced by Chuck Norris. After fighting for the WCL, Panza was appointed Head Coach for the World Combat League Team “The New York Clash”.

== Notable wins ==
• KO of UFC Veteran Larry Cureton

• KO of UFC Veteran Dwayne Casom

• KO of UFC and K-1 Veteran Patrick Smith

• KO of K-1 Veteran Dennis Lane

• Unanimous Win Over K-1 Veteran Kelly Leo

• Unanimous Win over Sabaki Challenge Champion Clarence Thatch

• Unanimous Win over Simon Dore for ISKA World Championship

== Accomplishments ==
He has trained fighters to world championship status including World Kickboxing Champion Tim Lane, and IFL Champion Deividas Taurosevičius who currently competes in the WEC. Panza has also prepared professional fighters for their matches in UFC and Pride Fighting Championships including Lion’s Den standouts Guy Mezger and Pete Williams. He also trained Stuttering John Melendez, 175 lbs, of the Howard Stern Show to victory against K-Rock DJ Crazy Cabbie, 260 lbs, in their celebrity boxing match.

He wrote a monthly column called “Puncher’s Corner” in Full Contact Fighter Magazine for six years. This was an instructional column including basic striking technique, advanced technique, fight strategy, and training methods. He has made several TV appearances on The Howard Stern Show, ESPN2, Martial Arts World, and has had fights featured on MSG, ESPN2, and VS Network.

Derek has worked as a spokesperson for Met-Rx Nutrition and has been featured in countless martial arts and fitness magazines and books for both fight career coverage as well as giving training insight and instruction. Some of the books and magazines featuring Panza are “The Complete Idiot’s Guide to Kickboxing,” “Black Belt Magazine,” “Fight Sport Magazine,” “Ultimate Fighter Magazine,” “Full Contact Fighter Magazine,” “Axle Magazine,” “Met Rx Magazine,” and “Muscular Development.” Panza has made numerous TV appearances on The Howard Stern Show, ESPN2, Martial Arts World, and has had fights featured on MSG, ESPN2, and Vs Network.

== World Cagefighting Alliance ==
Panza was the President of the World Cagefighting Alliance. The WCA was a Mixed Martial Arts fight promotion company that promoted professional fights in Atlantic City.
