= Chris Ballard (kickboxer) =

- Born: Christopher Paul Ballard; December 21, 1971; Reading, Berkshire, England
- Died: December 31, 2003 (aged 32); Reading, Berkshire, England
- Other names: "Sledgehammer"
- Nationality: English
- Height: 6 ft 3 in (1.90 m)
- Weight: 97 kg (214 lb; 15.3 st)
- Division: Heavyweight
- Fighting out of: Bracknell, England
- Years active: c. 1990–2003

Christopher Paul Ballard (21 December 1971 – 31 December 2003) was an English kickboxer and mixed martial artist who competed primarily in the heavyweight division. During the 1990s he won multiple regional and national titles under the World Kickboxing Association (WKA) and later held the WKN British Super-heavyweight title. In 1998 he reached the final of an eight-man international super-heavyweight tournament in France, moving up in the world rankings. His death in 2003 was reported nationally in The Guardian.

== Early life ==
Ballard was born on 21 December 1971 in Reading, Berkshire, to Paul Ballard and Elaine Ballard (née Edwards).

He later lived in Tilehurst and trained in Berkshire.

== Kickboxing career ==
=== British and regional titles ===
Ballard competed primarily under WKA rules during the mid-1990s. By 1996 he had won the WKA Southern Area and Midlands Area heavyweight titles.

On 17 December 1996 he defeated Nigel Parsons by first-round knockout to win the WKA British Heavyweight title under Thai rules. It was his first bout under Thai rules, which permitted elbow and knee strikes in addition to punches and kicks. At the time, he had 19 fights with 17 victories, 15 of them inside the distance.

=== International competition ===
In March 1998 Ballard competed in an eight-man full-contact super-heavyweight tournament in Bastille, France. He defeated Cart-Wisze of Germany and Jez Landau of France before losing in the final to Jan Michelle of the Netherlands. The performance moved him up three places in the heavyweight world rankings. The defeat was reported as his first in 18 months.

In July 1999 he fought Hiromi Amada at the King of the Ring event.

=== WKN British title ===
In February 2000 Ballard defeated Roger Toone at the "Best of the Best II" event in London.

Later that year, at York Hall in Bethnal Green, he lost the WKN British Super-heavyweight professional kickboxing title to Mark Geener, who stopped him in the sixth round of a scheduled seven-round championship bout.

== Mixed martial arts career ==
Ballard later competed in early UK mixed martial arts events.

At Extreme Brawl 1 in December 2002, he defeated Craig Amer by knockout in the first round in a +96.6 kg bout.

In June 2003, at Extreme Brawl 3, he was disqualified in a bout against Simon Dore after continuing to strike his opponent following a knockdown.

He later lost to Daniel Waciakowski by TKO at Extreme Brawl 4 in September 2003.

== Life outside martial arts ==
In April 2002, Ballard was working as a doorman at The Matrix nightclub in Reading when two people were shot during an incident at the venue. Contemporary reporting stated that he assisted injured patrons and helped police officers during the incident.

== Personal life and death ==
Ballard was found with a gunshot wound at his home in Lower Earley on 4 January 2004. Police stated that the death was not being treated as suspicious.

An inquest later recorded a verdict of suicide. The coroner stated that Ballard had been suffering from depression. The hearing was told that he had been purchasing isotretinoin (Roaccutane) online, although it could not be determined whether this had contributed to his death.

== Mixed martial arts record (partial) ==
Res.	Record	Opponent	Method	Event	Date	Round	Time	Location	Notes
Win		Craig Amer	KO	Extreme Brawl 1	December 15, 2002	1		Bracknell, England	
Loss		Simon Dore	DQ	Extreme Brawl 3	June 25, 2003	1		Bracknell, England	
Loss		Daniel Waciakowski	TKO	Extreme Brawl 4	September 28, 2003	3		Bracknell Leisure Centre, England	

== Kickboxing record (partial) ==
Res.	Record	Opponent	Method	Event	Date	Round	Time	Location	Notes
Win		Nigel Parsons	KO	WKA British Heavyweight Title (Thai rules)	December 17, 1996	1		Worcester Park, England	
Win		Cart-Wisze	TKO	Bastille Super-Heavyweight Tournament	March 1998	2		Bastille, France	
Win		Jez Landau	TKO	Bastille Super-Heavyweight Tournament	March 1998	2		Bastille, France	
Loss		Jan Michelle	TKO	Bastille Super-Heavyweight Final	March 1998	3		Bastille, France	
Loss		Hiromi Amada	TKO	WKA Night of the Gladiators	July 10, 1999	1		Pula, Croatia	
Loss		Mark Geener	TKO	WKN British Super-Heavyweight Championship	July 1, 2000	6		York Hall, London	
