= Stan Longinidis =

Australian kickboxer (born 1965)

- Born: Stan Longinidis; 25 June 1965 (age 61); Melbourne, Victoria, Australia
- Other names: The Man, The Greek Warrior
- Nationality: (Australia) Australian
- Height: 1.79 m (5 ft 10 in)
- Weight: 95 kg (209 lb)
- Division: Super Heavyweight; Heavyweight; Cruiserweight; Light Heavyweight
- Style: Kickboxing; Muay Thai; Bushido-Kai Karate
- Team: Fitzroy Stars Gymnasium; Jet Center
- Years active: 20 (1983–2003)

Kickboxing record
- Total: 103
- Wins: 88
- By knockout: 65
- Losses: 9
- By knockout: 4
- Draws: 5
- No contests: 1

Other information
- Website: http://www.stantheman.com.au/
- Last updated on: 12 September 2020

Stan "The Man" Longinidis (born 25 June 1965) is an Australian retired heavyweight kickboxer and 8-time world kickboxing champion. Born in Melbourne of Greek ethnicity, Longinidis is one of the few fighters to win world titles in four different styles of kickboxing competition: international rules, Oriental rules, full contact and Muay Thai. He holds notable victories over Branko Cikatić, Adam Watt, Peter Graham, Musashi and Dennis Alexio.

He is also an actor and motivational speaker.

== Biography ==
=== 1983-1989: Early career ===
Stan Longinidis began practicing martial arts in 1982 after being inspired by watching a martial artist defeat five opponents in a night club brawl. His kickboxing career commenced in 1983, and he had won two amateur titles when he challenged Santiago Garza for the WKA World Light Heavyweight Championship in 1987. Despite the contest ending in a draw, Longinidis had displayed such potential that he was invited to train full-time at the prestigious Jet Center kickboxing gym of Van Nuys. Determined to become Australia's first world champion in the sport, Longinidis resigned from his job as a computer programmer and moved to the United States. From his new home in California, he amassed 18 consecutive wins and won the WKA North American and US Heavyweight Championships, as well as the Australian National Heavyweight title.

=== 1990-1992: Heyday as world champion ===
In April 1990, Longinidis achieved his dream of becoming the first Australian to win a world kickboxing title when he claimed the KICK World Super Heavyweight Championship in a match against the legendary Anthony Elmore. The following year, he challenged the long-reigning WKA World Heavyweight Champion Maurice Smith for his title. Despite knocking the American down in the opening round, Longinidis eventually lost a battle of attrition and accepted a split decision defeat - his first professional loss. Undeterred, he soon acquired the WKA World Junior Heavyweight (Cruiserweight) and Super Heavyweight Championships, the latter coming by way of a record-setting 15-second knockout of Melvin Cole in Queensland.

In 1992, he notably defended his titles against top heavyweights Branko Cikatić and Grant Barker. He fought a full 12 rounds against Cikatić before winning by unanimous decision, and knocked out Barker with low kicks. He followed this up with additional wins over international powerhouses Mitch O'Hello and Adam Watt.

On 6 December 1992, Longinidis competed in one of the biggest and most controversial matches in history, against kickboxing superstar Dennis Alexio. Fuelled by media hype and personal animosity between the two fighters, it was one of the most highly-anticipated martial arts events when Longinidis and Alexio finally met in Melbourne to compete for the vacant ISKA World Oriental Rules Heavyweight Championship. The match lasted just 15 seconds, with Alexio falling to the mat after receiving a low kick from his opponent. Longinidis was declared the winner by KO and became the new champion.

Controversy arose when Alexio claimed to have broken his leg by stepping into a hole in the canvas, and thus the match's outcome was placed under review. The US branch of the ISKA overturned their ruling and changed it to a no contest, while the ISKA's Australian body and the WKA (which also sanctioned the match) upheld their original decision. A rematch between Longinidis and Alexio never took place.

=== 1993-2003: K-1 and later career ===
Longinidis continued to defend his titles, also adding the ISKA World Heavyweight Championship to his collection in 1993 and the WAKO PRO World Super Heavyweight Championship 1994. He began competing for the K-1 kickboxing promotion in March 1993, becoming one of the first major fighters to be signed by the company. After defeating reigning Karate World Cup champion Toshiyuki Atokawa in K-1's first event, Longinidis fought rising star Masaaki Satake in a title-versus-title affair, with Satake wagering his UKF World Super Heavyweight Championship and Longinidis his WKA World Super Heavyweight Championship. Longinidis lost by unanimous decision but retained his title after asserting that the match had not taken place under WKA rules.

Significant victories and setbacks marked Longinidis' career thereafter. He won the TAIPAN 1 tournament of 1994 by defeating three opponents in a single night, but lost his WKA, ISKA, and WAKO PRO World Super Heavyweight titles in a single match to Jeff Roufus in 1995. He qualified twice for the K-1 World Grand Prix, but was knocked out by Mike Bernardo in the 1995 quarterfinals and was unable to compete in the 1996 tournament due to injury. In June 1996, Longinidis won the inaugural WMTC World Super Heavyweight Muay Thai Championship in Pattaya was personally presented the title by King Rama IX. He lost the championship in September of the same year to Andy Hug. A serious knee injury threatened to end his career around this time and contributed to several losses, but Longinidis underwent complete reconstructive surgery in 1997.

Longinidis fought until 2000, when he retired after defeating fellow Australian Peter Graham at K-1 Oceania Star Wars 2000. He returned to the ring shortly afterwards for another several bouts before retiring for good in 2003. He ended his career with a record of 88 wins (65 KOs), 9 losses and 5 draws with one no contest.

=== 2004-present: Life after competition and accolades ===
Longinidis was awarded a lifetime achievement award at a France martial arts expo in 2000. The commendation recognised his significant impact on kickboxing and his status as one of the most famous names in the history of the sport. On 10 October 2013, he became the first martial artist to be inducted in the Australian Sports Hall of Fame.

Never far removed from the sport that made him famous, Longinidis trained his younger brother George Longinidis en route to winning the WOKA World Heavyweight Championship in 2009. He also managed kickboxing superstar Mike Zambidis.

Longinidis now works as a motivational speaker.

== Titles and accomplishments ==
World Kickboxing Federation

- 1998 WKBF World Heavyweight Champion

World Muaythai Council

- 1996 WMC World Super Heavyweight Champion

World Association of Kickboxing Organizations

- 1994 WAKO PRO World Super Heavyweight Champion

International Sport Karate Association

- 1993 ISKA World Heavyweight Champion (Freestyle Rules)
- 1992 ISKA World Heavyweight Champion (Oriental Rules)

World Kickboxing Association

- 1992 WKA World Super Heavyweight Champion
- 1991 WKA World Cruiserweight Champion
- 1989 WKA United States Heavyweight Champion
- 1988 WKA North American Heavyweight Champion
- 1984 WKA Amateur Australian Heavyweight Champion

Karate International Council of Kickboxing

- 1990 KICK World Super Heavyweight Champion
- 1988 KICK North American Heavyweight Champion

Other

- 1994 Taipan 1 World Heavyweight Champion
- 1990 Australian National Heavyweight Kickboxing Champion
- 1989 Intercontinental Heavyweight Kickboxing Champion

== Kickboxing record ==
Kickboxing record
88 wins (65 KOs) 9 Losses 5 Draws 1 NC
Date	Result	Opponent	Event	Location	Method	Round	Time
2003-02-17	Loss	(Australia) Gurkan Ozkan	K-1 No Respect 2003	Melbourne, Australia	TKO (Corner stoppage)	9	
2001-12-16	NC	(Japan) Ryuji Murakami	The Kakidamishi 2	Okinawa, Japan	No contest	5	3:00
Originally a unanimous decision win for Murakami, overturned after an appeal by Longinidis.
2000-11-29	Win	(Australia) Peter Graham	K-1 Oceania Star Wars 2000	Melbourne, Australia	Decision (Unanimous)	10	2:00
2000-09-03	Win	(South Africa) Hannes van der Berg	K-1 Africa Grand Prix 2000	Cape Town, South Africa	KO	1	
2000-07-30	Loss	(Japan) Taiei Kin	K-1 World Grand Prix 2000 in Nagoya	Nagoya, Aichi, Japan	Majority decision (0-2)	3	3:00
2000-05-12	Win	(South Africa) Jokki Oberholtzer	K-1 King of the Ring 2000	Bologna, Italy	TKO	1	1:55
2000-03-19	Draw	(Japan) Tsuyoshi Nakasako	K-1 Burning 2000	Tokyo, Japan	Decision (1-0)	5	3:00
1999-05-14	Loss	(United States) Rick Roufus	IKF Mass Destruction	Lowell, USA	TKO	9	
Bout was for the inaugural IKF World Heavyweight Championship.
1998-10-28	Win	(Japan) Tsuyoshi Nakasako	K-1 Japan '98 Kamikaze	Tokyo, Japan	TKO (Nose broken)	4	
1997-07-20	Loss	(South Africa) Duane van der Merwe	K-1 Dream '97	Nagoya, Japan	Decision (Majority)	5	3:00
1997-06-08	Win	(Australia) Grant Barker	Now Or Never	Sydney, Australia	KO (Left high kick)	2	1:00
Retains the WKA World Super Heavyweight Championship.
1997-04-29	Win	(Japan) Takeru	K-1 Braves '97	Fukuoka, Japan	Decision (Unanimous)	5	3:00
1996-12-08	Draw	(South Africa) Mike Bernardo	K-1 Hercules '96	Nagoya, Japan	Draw	5	3:00
1996-10-18	Win	(Japan) Masaaki Miyamoto	K-1 Star Wars '96	Yokohama, Japan	TKO (Corner stoppage)	3	2:55
1996-09-01	Loss	(Switzerland) Andy Hug	K-1 Revenge '96	Osaka, Japan	KO (Left straight)	2	2:00
Loses the WMC World Super Heavyweight Championship.
1996-03-30	Win	(United Kingdom) Kirkwood Walker	WMC King's 50th Anniversary	Pattaya, Thailand	Decision (Unanimous)	5	3:00
Wins the inaugural WMC World Super Heavyweight Championship.
1996-03-10	Win	(Thailand) Sadau Kiatsongrit	K-1 Grand Prix '96 Opening Battle	Yokohama, Japan	Ext.R Decision (Unanimous)	6	3:00
Qualifies for the K-1 World Grand Prix 1996, but would be unable to participate due to injury.
1995-12-09	Win	(Japan) Musashi	K-1 Hercules	Nagoya, Japan	Decision (Unanimous)	5	3:00
1995-10-22	Loss	(Australia) Sam Greco	The Best of the Best - Final	Australia	Decision (Unanimous)	3	3:00
The bout was for The Best of the Best Championship.
1995-10-22	Win	(Papua New Guinea) Mitch O'Hello	The Best of the Best - Semifinal	Australia			
1995-10-22	Win	(Australia) Nathan Briggs	The Best of the Best - Quarterfinal	Australia			
1995-09-03	Win	(Japan) Nobuaki Kakuda	K-1 Revenge II	Yokohama, Japan	KO (Right low kick)	2	3:05
1995-05-04	Loss	(South Africa) Mike Bernardo	K-1 Grand Prix '95 Quarter Finals	Tokyo, Japan	KO (Right high kick)	3	1:42
1995-03-25	Loss	(United States) Jeff Roufus	World Cup of Martial arts	Ledyard, United States	KO (Overhand right)	1	0:41
Loses the WKA, ISKA and WAKO World Super Heavyweight Championships.
1995-03-03	Win	(United States) Patrick Smith	K-1 Grand Prix '95 Opening Battle	Tokyo, Japan	KO (Right low kick)	2	2:59
Qualifies for the K-1 World Grand Prix 1995.
1994-09-18	Win	(Croatia) Branko Cikatić	K-1 Revenge	Yokohama, Japan	Decision (Unanimous)	5	3:00
1994-03-06	Win	(Russia) Vladimir Golovinsky	Taipan 1: The Best of the Best - Final	Australia	KO	1	
Wins the Taipan 1 World Championship.
1994-03-06	Win	(United States) Dino Homsey	Taipan 1: The Best of the Best - Semifinal	Australia	KO	1	
1994-03-06	Win	(Netherlands) Bob Schrijber	Taipan 1: The Best of the Best - Quarterfinal	Australia	Decision (Unanimous)	3	3:00
1993-09-04	Loss	(Japan) Masaaki Satake	K-1 Illusion	Tokyo, Japan	Decision (Unanimous)	5	3:00
The bout was for Satake's UKF World Super Heavyweight Championship and Longinidis' WKA World Super Heavyweight Championship. Longinidis lost but retained his title after asserting that the bout was not regulated by WKA rules.
1993-07-25	Win	(United Kingdom) Gary Sandland	WKA Battle of Champions	Australia	KO (Right straight)	3	
Retains the WKA World Super Heavyweight Championship.
1993-03-30	Win	(Japan) Toshiyuki Atokawa	K-1 Sanctuary I	Tokyo, Japan	TKO (Referee stoppage)	5	2:22
1992-12-06	Win (Note: The WKA and ISKA-Australia record the outcome as a win for Longinidis, while the ISKA-US records it as a no contest.)	(United States) Dennis Alexio	ISKA-WKA Alexio vs. Longinidis	Melbourne Australia	KO (Left low kick)	1	0:15
Won the ISKA Oriental Rules World Heavyweight Championship. Listed in the Guinness World Records as the "fastest knockout in kickboxing world title match."
1992-10-04	Win	(Australia) Adam Watt	Seidokaikan '92 Karate World Cup - Kakutogi Olympic III	Osaka, Japan	TKO (Dislocated shoulder)		
1992-06	Win	(Croatia) Branko Cikatić		Melbourne, Australia	Decision (Unanimous)	12	
Retains the WKA World Cruiserweight Championship.
1992	Win	(Papua New Guinea) Mitch O'Hello		Australia	KO (Low kick)	1	
1992	Win	(United States) Grant Barker		Australia	KO (Left low kicks)	4	
Retains the WKA World Cruiserweight Championship.
1992	Win	(United Kingdom) Lawrence White		Australia	KO	7	
Wins the WKA World Cruiserweight Championship.
1992	Loss	(United States) Melvin Cole		Queensland, Australia	KO	1	0:15
Wins Cole's WKA World Super Heavyweight Championship.
1991	Loss	(United States) Maurice Smith		Sydney, Australia	Decision (Split)	12	2:00
The bout was for Smith's WKA World Heavyweight Championship.
1990-04	Win	(United States) Anthony Elmore	KICK Kickboxing	Sydney, Australia]	Decision (Split)	12	
Wins the KICK World Super Heavyweight Championship. Longinidis becomes the first Australian world kickboxing champion.
1990	Win	(United States) Dale Broussard		Las Vegas, USA	KO (Right hook)	1	
Longinidis' record is announced before the bout as 15-0-1 with 10 KOs.
1989-12-04	Win	(United States) Charles Archie	WKA Kickboxing	Melbourne, Australia	KO (Right hook)	1	
Retains the WKA US Heavyweight Championship.
1988-03	Win	(United States) Brendon Leddy	WKA Kickboxing	Los Angeles, USA	KO	3	
Wins the WKA US Heavyweight Championship.
1988	Win	(United States) Kenneth Penn	KICK Kickboxing	United States	TKO (Corner stoppage)	1	
Wins the KICK North American Heavyweight Championship.
1987	Draw	(Mexico) Santiago Garza	WKA Kickboxing	Perth, Australia	Draw	12	2:00
Bout was for the WKA World Light Heavyweight Championship.
Legend: Win Loss Draw/No contest Notes

== Filmography ==
=== Film ===
Year	Title	Role
1990	Angel Town	Himself
1991	Ring of Fire	Terry Wu's Opponent
1992	Bloodfist III: Forced to Fight	Leadbottom
2002	Trojan Warrior	Ajax

== See also ==
- List of K-1 events
- List of K-1 champions
- List of male kickboxers
