= ISKA (sports governing body) =

Governing body for the sports of karate, kickboxing, and mixed martial arts (MMA)

International Sport Karate and Kickboxing Association
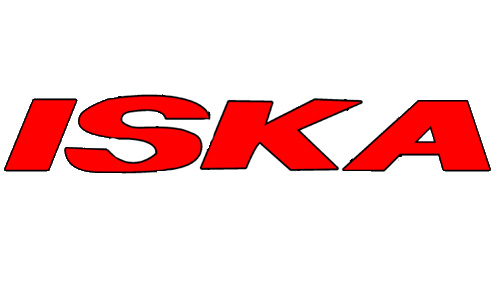
- Type: Private
- Industry: Kickboxing, Kun Khmer, MMA, and Sport Karate promotion
- Founded: 1985
- Headquarters: United States
- Key people: Cory Schafer (President)
- Website: www.iska.com

The ISKA (originally International Sport Karate Association, later also called the International Sport Kickboxing Association) is an international body regulating sport karate and kickboxing matches. It is based in the United States. It was established in 1985 as a response to legal and revenue issues that sent the Professional Karate Association (PKA) into decline.

== History ==
From 1974 until 1985, the PKA had been the most recognized worldwide kickboxing sanctioning group. It was instrumental in establishing public relay of the sport via ESPN, helping to introduce the burgeoning sport to a wider audience, and had also developed the first fighter's ratings systems. Five major U.S.-based promoters and resigning PKA executives created the new body, the International Sport Karate Association (ISKA), with an official announcement on July 16, 1986. The first U.S. directors were Mike Sawyer, Karyn Turner, Tony Thompson, John Worley and Scott Coker. It currently runs the biggest martial arts tournament in the world, The U.S Open. Thousands of competitors from around the world participate every year.

Many of the major PKA promoters began sanctioning their events with the ISKA and several also joined its administration. ISKA also secured ESPN broadcasts of its major title bouts in 1986, thus helping bring quick credibility and recognition to the new association.

Since the World Association of Kickboxing Organizations (WAKO) was mostly active in Europe and the World Kickboxing Association (WKA) in Asia, ISKA was quick to expand through its own European Directors starting October 1986 with Olivier Muller, Jérome Canabate and Mohamed Hosseini. American Richard Mayor oversaw the establishment of this European wing as European President between 1986 and 1988.

By 1991, the worldwide control of the ISKA was shared by two co-chairmen: Mike Sawyer and Olivier Muller. International TV coverage was secured, and united separate organizations were formed worldwide to handle responsibility for international sanctioning and grading.

In 1997, Cory Schafer was appointed ISKA President. By the early 2000s ISKA began sanctioning K-1 events such as K1-MAX and K-1 USA, and for several years they also sanctioned both kickboxing and MMA events for Strikeforce. Starting from 2012, ISKA sanctioned events for the kickboxing promotion GLORY.

== Current activities ==
=== Professional competition ===
ISKA is the sanctioning body in the United States and over 50 countries worldwide which sanctions all styles of kickboxing which includes K-1 Rules, Full Contact, Oriental Rules, Muay Thai, Semi Contact, and Low kick.

=== Amateur competition ===
ISKA's Martial Arts World Championships are held yearly at the US Open of Martial Arts in Disney World, Orlando, Florida. The US Open ISKA World Martial Arts Championships is held annually every year on the Fourth of July weekend. More than 8,000 competitors and 12,000 spectators attend the two-day event each year. The event closes with the Night of Champions featuring the ISKA World Martial Arts Championships, which was featured on ESPN in both live and pre-recorded segments. The US Open was the longest continuously running martial arts event on ESPN until 2023, when it moved to FITE. The US Open highlights continue to air throughout the year on CSI Sports networks, reaching approximately 85 million households.

== Notable fighters ==
- Rick Roufus
- Ernesto Hoost
- Andrew Tate
- Ray Sefo
- Fredia Gibbs
- Javier Mendez
- Conrad Pla
- Giorgio Petrosyan
- Tenshin Nasukawa
- Jérôme Le Banner
- Lisa Howarth
- Maurice Smith
- Jean-Claude Leuyer
- Don Wilson
- Jean-Yves Thériault
- Jiří Žák
- Kash Gill
- Dennis Alexio
- Rob Kaman
- Duke Roufus
- Stan Longinidis
- Alexey Ignashov
- Freddy Kemayo
- Arnold Oborotov
- Peter Graham
- Paul Slowinski
- Hélène Connart
- Andy Souwer
- Mustapha Haida
- Daniel Dawson
- Chad Sugden
- Enriko Kehl
- Karim Ghajji
- Jordan Watson
- Jonathan Haggerty
- Tim Thomas
- Johnny Davis
- Marek Piotrowski
- Jegish Yegoian
- Stephen Thompson
- Jorge Loren
- Moisés Baute
- Curtis Schuster
- Rodney Glunder
- Steve Moxon
- Joe Ryan
- Alexander Oleinik
- Andre Mannaart
- Donald Cerrone
- Roberto Cocco
- Alex Gong
- Michael McDonald
- Duane Ludwig
- Ramon Dekkers
- Derek Panza
- Lucy Payne
- Farès Ziam
- Jamie Bates
- Chhoeung Lvai
