= Taiei Kin =

Zainichi Korean MMA fighter (born 1970)

Kin Taiei
- Born: Kin Taiei; July 8, 1970 (age 56); Amagasaki, Hyogo, Japan
- Native name: 金 泰泳 / 김 태영
- Other names: Kin-chan
- Nationality: Japanese
- Height: 1.77 m (5 ft 10 in)
- Weight: 85 kg (187 lb; 13.4 st)
- Division: Light Heavyweight
- Style: Seidokaikan karate
- Team: Seido kaikan
- Rank: 4th Dan Black Belt in Karate
- Years active: 1992–present

Kickboxing record
- Total: 32
- Wins: 24
- By knockout: 6
- Losses: 7
- By knockout: 1
- Draws: 1

Mixed martial arts record
- Total: 7
- Wins: 4
- By knockout: 2
- By decision: 2
- Losses: 3
- By knockout: 2
- By submission: 1

Other information
- University: Korea University
- Mixed martial arts record from Sherdog
- Last updated on: September 26, 2009

Kin Taiei (Korean: 김태영, romanized: Kim Taeyong; born July 8, 1970) is a Korean-Japanese light heavyweight karateka, kickboxer and mixed martial artist competing in K-1 and DREAM.

Before switching to MMA, According to Peter Aerts and Ernesto Hoost, Kin was the best fighter to come out of Asia during his time competing in K-1.

== Biography ==
=== Early years ===
Kin Taiei (金泰泳) was born as the eldest son in Amagasaki city of Hyogo prefecture, Japan on July 8, 1970. As he is the eldest son, he's got a younger brother. Both of his parents worked till late at night, he was sent to Karate dojo for combing the care with a nursery school. He took an interest in football (soccer) at 4th year of elementary school, and dropped out training karate at 6th year. He won the Japanese national championship for junior high schools at the 3rd year. When he was a student of Kobe Korean Senior High school, he tried to start practicing boxing because he had a longing for foreign boxers, but he joined karate team in his school because his parents objected strongly. For this reason, he also joined the karate team of Korea University in Tokyo when he became a university student. During his university life, he participated a full contact karate championship promoted by Sato juku, but he was beaten by Nobuaki Kakuda. Although he lost, he was evaluated highly by Kazuyoshi Ishii, and he was invited to Seidokaikan. Thus, Kin became a student of Seidokaikan in Osaka after graduation of university.

=== Debut ===
On January 31, 1993, Kin participated in "The 2nd Towa Cup Karate Japan Open Tournament", but he was beaten by Masaaki Satake in the final.

On June 25, he fought against Changpuek Kiatsongrit from Thailand for the vacant title of UKF World Light heavyweight championship at the event of "Sanctuary III", but he lost by decision.

=== Work as trainer ===
In 2006 and 2007, he trained Hong-man Choi in his K-1 career. Choi showed notable improvement during the time Kin was in his corner. They worked together for almost two years in which Choi had nine fights. He won six of them and lost three, twice against Jérôme Le Banner and once against Mighty Mo (kickboxer). Among his six wins was a win over K-1 Dominator Semmy Schilt and a Rematch win over Mighty Mo, in which Kin changed Choi's fighting style from orthodox to southpaw to block Mo's devastating overhand right better.

== Titles ==
- 2009 K-1 World Grand Prix in Seoul finalist
- 1996 WMTC World Junior middleweight champion
- 1995 Karate World Cup champion
- 1995 K-3 Grand Prix runner up
- 1994 UKF World Light heavyweight champion
- 1994 Karate Japan Open finalist
- 1993 Karate World Cup 3rd Place
- 1993 Karate Japan Open finalist
- 1992 Karate World Cup finalist (lost to Andy Hug)

== Kickboxing record ==
Professional kickboxing record
33 fights, 25 wins, 7 losses, 1 draw
Date	Result	Opponent	Event	Location	Method	Round	Time
2014-08-10	Win	(Japan) Niyama Makoto	Accelerator 28	Japan	TKO		
2011-12-25	Win	(Japan) Ryuji Goto	Accelerator 18	Japan	TKO (corner stoppage)	2	3:00
2011-06-05	Win	(Japan) Kuniyoshi	Heat 18	Osaka, Japan	Ext.R decision (3-0)	4	3:00
2009-11-22	Win	(Japan) Magnum Sakai	RISE 60	Bunkyo, Tokyo, Japan	Ext.R decision (3-0)	4	3:00
2009-09-26	Win	(Romania) Cătălin Moroşanu	K-1 World Grand Prix 2009 in Seoul Final 16	Seoul, Korea	Disqualification	2	3:00
2009-08-02	Loss	(India) Singh Jaideep	K-1 World Grand Prix 2009 in Seoul Final	Seoul, Korea	Decision (3-0)	3	3:00
The bout was for the title of K-1 World Grand Prix 2009 in Seoul Asia Grand Prix Tournament.
2009-08-02	Win	(Japan) Takumi Sato	K-1 World Grand Prix 2009 in Seoul Semi-Final	Seoul, Korea	Decision (2-1)	3	3:00
2009-08-02	Win	(China) Sun Wu	K-1 World Grand Prix 2009 in Seoul Quarter-Final	Seoul, Korea	TKO (doctor stoppage)	2	2:00
2007-08-05	Win	(Japan) Yusuke Fujimoto	K-1 World Grand Prix 2007 in Hong Kong Semi-Final	Hong Kong	TKO (right high kick)	2	1:59
Despite win, had to withdraw from tournament due to injury.
2007-08-05	Win	(United States) Sentoryu	K-1 World Grand Prix 2007 in Hong Kong Quarter-Final	Seoul, Korea	TKO (right high kick)	1	1:43
2000-07-30	Win	(Australia) Stan Longinidis	K-1 World Grand Prix 2000 in Nagoya	Nagoya, Aichi, Japan	Decision (2-0)	3	3:00
1998-03-14	Win	(Japan) Taro Minato	Battle of the strongest				
1997-11-09	Win	(Japan) Taro Minato	K-1 Grand Prix '97 Final	Tokyo, Japan	Decision (3-0)	5	3:00
1997-06-07	Win	(France) Orlando Wiet	K-1 Fight Night '97	Zurich, Switzerland	Decision (3-0)	5	3:00
1997	Loss	(Thailand) Kong Pathapee Sor Sumalee	Thailand	Thailand	Decision	5	
1996-09-01	Win	(Thailand) Wanlop Sor.Sarthaphan	K-1 Revenge '96	Osaka, Osaka, Japan	Decision (3-0)	5	3:00
Wins Wanlop's WMTC (currently WMC) World Junior middleweight Championship.
1996-03-30	Loss	(Thailand) Wanlop Sor.Sarthaphan	King's Assumption 50th Anniversary Event	Thailand	Decision (3-0)	5	3:00
The bout was for the vacant title of WMTC (currently WMC) World Junior middleweight Championship.
1996-06-02	Win	(Switzerland) Azem Maksutaj	K-1 Fight Night II	Zurich, Switzerland	Decision (3-0)	5	3:00
1995-12-09	Win	(Netherlands) Peter Teysse	K-1 Hercules	Nagoya, Japan	TKO (corner stoppage)	2	3:00
1995-09-03	Win	(Australia) Dale Westerman	K-1 Revenge II	Yokohama, Japan	Decision (3-0)	5	3:00
1995-07-16	Loss	(Netherlands) Ivan Hippolyte	K-3 Grand Prix '95	Nagoya, Japan	Decision (2-0)	3	3:00
1995-07-16	Win	(France) Orlando Wiet	K-3 Grand Prix '95	Nagoya, Japan	Ext.R decision (2-0)	4	3:00
1995-07-16	Win	(Australia) Gurkan Ozkan	K-3 Grand Prix '95	Nagoya, Japan	Decision (3-0)	3	3:00
1995-06-10	Win	(Germany) Andre Mewis	K-1 Fight Night	Zurich, Switzerland	Decision (3-0)	5	3:00
1995-03-25	Draw	(Netherlands) Bayram Colak	K League		Decision draw	5	3:00
1994-12-10	Win	(England) Eugene Valerio	K-1 Legend	Tokyo, Japan	Decision (3-0)	5	3:00
1994-09-18	Win	(France) Orlando Wiet	K-1 Revenge	Tokyo, Japan	KO (right high kick)	4	0:08
1994-03-04	Win	(Thailand) Changpuek Kiatsongrit	K-1 Challenge	Chiyoda, Tokyo, Japan	Decision (3-0)	5	3:00
Wins Changpuek's title of UKF World Light heavyweight Championship.
1993-12-05	Loss	(Australia) Paul Briggs	Revenge	Melbourne, Australia	KO (right knee)	1	2:55
1993-11-15	Win	(United States) Tommy Rhinehart	K-1 Andy's Glove	Tokyo, Japan	KO (kick)	1	2:04
1993-09-04	Win	(Thailand) Phothai Chorwaikool	K-1 Illusion	Tokyo, Japan	Decision (3-0)	5	3:00
1993-06-25	Loss	(Thailand) Changpuek Kiatsongrit	Sanctuary III	Osaka, Osaka, Japan	Decision (3-0)	5	3:00
The bout was for the vacant title of UKF World Light heavyweight Championship.
1993-04-03	Win	(England) Michael Thompson	K-1 Grand Prix '93	Tokyo, Japan	Decision (3-0)	5	3:00
Legend: Win Loss Draw/no contest Notes

== Karate record ==
Professional karate record
9 fights, 8 wins, 1 Loss
Date	Result	Opponent	Event	Location	Method	Round	Time
1993-10-03	Loss	(Japan) Masaaki Satake	Karate World Cup '93	Japan			
1993-10-03	Win	(England) Michael Thompson	Karate World Cup '93	Japan			
1993-10-03	Win	(Japan) Atsushi Tamaki	Karate World Cup '93	Japan			
Legend: Win Loss Draw/no contest Notes

== Mixed martial arts record ==
Professional record breakdown
7 matches	4 wins	3 losses
By knockout	2	2
By submission	0	1
By decision	2	0

Res.	Record	Opponent	Method	Event	Date	Round	Time	Location	Notes
Win	4–3	Sentoryū Henri	TKO (corner stoppage)	Heat - Heat 16	November 6, 2010	1	4:01	Osaka, Japan	
Loss	3–3	Zelg Galesic	TKO (elbow injury)	Dream 4: Middleweight Grand Prix 2008 Second Round	June 15, 2008	1	1:05	Yokohama, Japan	
Win	3–2	Ikuhisa Minowa	Decision (unanimous)	Dream 2: Middleweight Grand Prix 2008 First Round	April 29, 2008	2	5:00	Saitama, Japan	
Loss	2–2	Zelg Galešić	TKO (doctor stoppage)	Hero's 2007 in Korea	October 28, 2007	1	0:36	Seoul, South Korea	
Win	2–1	Kiyoshi Tamura	Decision (unanimous)	Hero's 9	July 16, 2007	2	5:00	Yokohama, Japan	
Win	1–1	Tokimitsu Ishizawa	KO (head kick)	K-1 Premium Dynamite!! 2006	December 31, 2006	1	2:48	Osaka, Japan	
Loss	0–1	Yoshihiro Akiyama	Technical submission (armbar)	Hero's 6	August 5, 2006	1	2:01	Tokyo, Japan	Hero's 2006 Light Heavyweight Grand Prix quarter-final.

== See also ==
- List of K-1 events
- List of male kickboxers
