= Francisco Filho (martial artist) =

Brazilian martial artist

- Born: Francisco Alves Filho; January 10, 1971 (age 55); Souto Soares, Bahia, Brazil
- Other names: Chiquinho
- Height: 1.86 m (6 ft 1 in)
- Weight: 108 kg (238 lb; 17.0 st)
- Division: Heavyweight
- Style: Kyokushin Karate
- Team: Team Ichigeki; Liberdade Dojo
- Trainer: Seiji Isobe
- Rank: 7th dan black belt in Kyokushin Karate; Purple belt in Brazilian Jiu-Jitsu
- Years active: 19 (1985–2004)

Kickboxing record
- Total: 25
- Wins: 16
- By knockout: 9
- Losses: 7
- By knockout: 2
- Draws: 2

Other information
- Notable students: Nicholas Pettas, Vitor Belfort
- Last updated on: January 16, 2010

Francisco "Chiquinho" Alves Filho (born January 10, 1971) is a Brazilian Kyokushin Karateka and kickboxer. He is one of the few karate-ka to have successfully completed the 100 man kumite more than once.

He holds notable K-1 wins over Sam Greco, Andy Hug, Remy Bonjasky, Ernesto Hoost, Peter Aerts and Stefan Leko.

== Career ==
Francisco Filho started Kyokushin kaikan around age of 10 and received black belt six and half years later. Filho continued to compete successfully in national and international Kyokushin tournaments. At the 5th South American Tournament in 1989, aged 18, he won his first international title, which strengthened his ambition to become a world champion. In 1990, he won his first Brazilian Open title.

Between 2 and 4 November 1991, Filho competed in the 5th World Open Tournament, his first World Open event. During the tournament, he faced Switzerland's Andy Hug in a controversial bout. Filho knocked Hug out with a roundhouse kick that landed after the bell, but the result was upheld despite a protest from the Swiss team. Filho was later eliminated by Kenji Yamaki in the final 16. Their match was tied, with Yamaki advancing after winning the tameshiwara board-breaking round. Mas Oyama subsequently presented Filho with an award for the tournament's best technique.

The defeat increased Filho's determination to win a world championship. Over the following four years, he intensified his training, working with the Brazilian national team and receiving additional instruction from his teacher, Isobe. During this period, he won the Uruguayan Open in 1991, the Brazilian Open in 1992 and 1993, and the 6th and 7th South American Championships in 1992 and 1994.

Following Mas Oyama's death in Tokyo on 26 April 1994, Filho and Isobe were invited to attend his funeral. While in Japan, Filho underwent his third-dan grading at the International Karate Organisation (IKO) Hombu. As part of the grading, he was required to participate in the 100-Man Kumite. He had previously completed the challenge in Brazil one month earlier.

In 1995, Filho was invited to participate in the 100-Man Kumite Challenge. In preparation for the event, he trained for approximately eight hours each day, eventually completing up to 100 rounds of pad work in a single session. His conditioning also included striking his body with a baseball bat to replicate the impact of blows received during combat. In addition, he reportedly took part in between 50 and 80 fights each week.

On 22 March 1995, Filho completed the 100-Man Kumite at the IKO Hombu in Tokyo. He initially felt nervous but became more comfortable during the early fights. After 60 bouts, fatigue and muscle cramps began to affect him, while following the 80th fight he experienced slower physical responses. He ultimately completed the challenge with 76 victories and 24 draws, without a defeat, in 3 hours and 2 minutes. He was among the few participants to complete the challenge without requiring hospitalisation.

Following the challenge, Filho toured Europe, training at several dojos and learning different techniques. Later in 1995, he won another Brazilian Open title and competed in the 6th World Open Tournament from 3 to 5 November. He reached the semifinals, where he faced Hajime Kazumi. After three overtime extensions failed to produce a decisive result, the bout was determined by tameshiwara. Filho broke 22 boards, while Kazumi broke 24 to advance to the final, where he was defeated by Kenji Yamaki.

The result was followed by a period of disappointment for Filho, who considered leaving karate. He subsequently moved to Germany and began competing in both kickboxing and Kyokushin karate. The transition required adjustments, particularly regarding distance and techniques involving strikes to the head. He also travelled to the United States and Japan for additional training.

In 1997, Filho competed in the inaugural World Super Heavyweight Karate Tournament and defeated fellow Brazilian and training partner Glaube Feitosa to win the title. That same year, he received an invitation to compete in K-1 after obtaining permission from IKO-1 head Shokei Matsui. On 20 July, he faced Andy Hug for the second time and won by knockout. He made his professional K-1 fighting debut on July 20, 1997 at the K-1 Dream '97 tournament against Kyokushin and Seidokaikan fighter Andy Hug. This was their second encounter, the first being at the 5th Kyokushin World Tournament in 1991 that resulted in a controversial knockout victory for Filho with a technique that connected after the bell rang. The second fight was also won by Filho quickly earning the Brazilian a large fan base in Japan as well as making him one of the then top contenders for the K-1 World GP Championship title.

Filho's period in Germany and his participation in kickboxing helped restore his motivation and competitive form. By 1999, he had returned to Brazil and resumed training with Isobe.

The 7th World Open Tournament was held in Japan from 5 to 7 November 1999. Despite having injured his ankle before the tournament, Filho progressed to the final, where he again faced Hajime Kazumi. As in their previous encounter, the fight went through three overtime extensions without a decisive winner. In the tameshiwara round, Filho broke 21 boards compared with Kazumi's 19, securing the victory.

With the win, Filho became the first non-Japanese fighter to win the Kyokushin World Championship. His victory fulfilled his long-standing goal of becoming world champion.

Filho and Andy Hug subsequently became friends despite their earlier rivalry. Hug died on 24 August 2000, and Filho was among the pallbearers at his funeral, which was attended by approximately 800 people.

Filho continued competing in K-1 during the following years. On 20 August 2000, he won the K-1 Grand Prix in Yokohama. At the K-1 World Grand Prix 2000 Final Tournament at the Tokyo Dome on 10 December, he was defeated by Ernesto Hoost in the semifinals. In 2001, Filho again reached the K-1 World Grand Prix Final Tournament, where he lost the final to Mark Hunt.

Filho retired from major tournament competition in 2004 with a record of 16 wins, including nine by knockout, seven losses and two draws. By 2006, he had established his own dojo in Bragança, Brazil. He later served as a coach on the 2012 season of *The Ultimate Fighter: Brazil*.

Filho has since held championship titles in both K-1 as well as in IKO Kyokushinkaikan. He has not taken part in any major competition since 2004 but remains active developing young fighters and in overseeing Brazil’s Kyokushin national team.

On 26 April 2014, the 20th anniversary of Mas Oyama's death, Filho attended an event at the IKO-1 Hombu in Tokyo during which Tariel Nikoleishvili attempted the 100-Man Kumite. Also present were IKO-1 head Shokei Matsui and Artur Hovhannisyan, who had previously completed the challenge. Nikoleishvili completed the kumite in 3 hours and 21 minutes, recording 64 wins, 27 draws and nine losses.

Filho subsequently continued to conduct Kyokushin karate and kickboxing seminars and training sessions internationally. He also served as South American president of IKO-1. His career included two successful completions of the 100-Man Kumite and a Kyokushin World Championship victory, in addition to his achievements in K-1.

== Titles and accomplishments ==
- Kickboxing
  - 2001 K-1 World Grand Prix runner up
  - 2001 K-1 World Grand Prix in Fukuoka Repechage A Champion
  - 2000 K-1 World GP in Yokohama Champion
- Kyokushin
  - 1999 (gold) 7th Kyokushin World Open Karate Tournament IKO 1 (defeated Hajime Kazumi)
  - 1997 (gold) 1st Kyokushin World Weight Tournament Heavyweight
  - 1995 (bronze) 6th Kyokushin World Open Karate Tournament IKO 1 (lost to Hajime Kazumi)
  - 1995 (gold) Brazilian Open
  - 1994 (gold) Mundialito Open
  - 1994 (gold) 7th South American Championships
  - 1993 (gold) Brazilian Open
  - 1992 (gold) 6th South American Championships
  - 1992 (gold) Brazilian Open
  - 1991 5th Kyokushin World Open Karate Tournament final 16 (lost to Kenji Yamaki)
  - 1991 (gold) Uruguayan Open Karate Championships
  - 1990 (gold) Paulista Championships
  - 1990 (gold) Brazilian Open
  - 1989 (gold) 5th South American Championships
  - 1989 (gold) Paulista Championships
  - 1988 (gold) Paulista Championships Juniors
  - 1988 Brazilian Open 6th place
  - 1987 Brazilian Open 7th place
  - 1987 (gold) Paulista Championships Juniors
  - 1986 (silver) Paulista Championships Juniors
  - 1985 (silver) Paulista Championships Juniors
- In 1995 Filho completed 100 man kumite in Brazil and in Japan.

== Kickboxing record ==
Kickboxing record
16 wins (9 (T)KOs, 7 decisions), 7 losses, 2 draws
Date	Result	Opponent	Event	Location	Method	Round	Time	Record
2004-05-30	Win	(Netherlands) Remy Bonjasky	Kyokushin vs K-1 2004 All Out Battle	Tokyo, Japan	Decision (unanimous)	3	3:00	16-7-2
2003-12-31	Win	(New Zealand) Toa	K-1 PREMIUM 2003 Dynamite!!	Tokyo, Japan	Decision (unanimous)	3	3:00	15-7-2
2003-10-11	Loss	(Germany) Stefan Leko	K-1 World Grand Prix 2003 Final Elimination	Osaka, Japan	Decision (unanimous)	3	3:00	14-7-2
2003-07-13	Draw	(South Africa) Mike Bernardo	K-1 World Grand Prix 2003 in Fukuoka	Fukuoka, Japan	Decision draw	5	3:00	14-6-2
2001-12-18	Loss	(New Zealand) Mark Hunt	K-1 World Grand Prix 2001 Final	Tokyo, Japan	Ext.R decision (unanimous)	4	3:00	14-6-1
Fight was for K-1 World Grand Prix 2001 tournament title.
2001-12-18	Win	(Belarus) Alexey Ignashov	K-1 World Grand Prix 2001 Semi Finals	Tokyo, Japan	Decision (unanimous)	3	3:00	14-5-1
2001-12-18	Win	(Netherlands) Peter Aerts	K-1 World Grand Prix 2001 Quarter Finals	Tokyo, Japan	TKO (corner stoppage)	2	3:00	13-5-1
2001-10-08	Win	(Netherlands) Lloyd van Dams	K-1 World Grand Prix 2001 in Fukuoka Final	Fukuoka, Japan	Ext.R decision (majority)	4	3:00	12-5-1
Wins K-1 World Grand Prix 2001 in Fukuoka Repechage A Tournament.
2001-10-08	Win	(Belarus) Sergei Ivanovich	K-1 World Grand Prix 2001 in Fukuoka Semi Finals	Fukuoka, Japan	Decision (unanimous)	3	3:00	11-5-1
2001-08-11	Loss	(Belarus) Sergei Ivanovich	K-1 World Grand Prix 2001 in Las Vegas Quarter Finals	Las Vegas, Nevada	Ext.R decision (unanimous)	4	3:00	10-5-1
2000-12-10	Loss	(Netherlands) Ernesto Hoost	K-1 World Grand Prix 2000 Semi Finals	Tokyo, Japan	Decision (unanimous)	3	3:00	10-4-1
2000-12-10	Win	(Germany) Stefan Leko	K-1 World Grand Prix 2000 Quarter Finals	Tokyo, Japan	Ext.R decision (unanimous)	4	3:00	10-3-1
2000-08-20	Win	(France) Cyril Abidi	K-1 World Grand Prix 2000 in Yokohama Final	Yokohama, Japan	TKO (corner stoppage)	2	0:25	9-3-1
Wins K-1 World Grand Prix 2000 in Yokohama Tournament title.
2000-08-20	Win	(England) Matt Skelton	K-1 World Grand Prix 2000 in Yokohama Semi Finals	Yokohama, Japan	KO (right punch)	2	2:42	8-3-1
2000-08-20	Win	(Japan) Tsuyoshi Nakasako	K-1 World Grand Prix 2000 in Yokohama Quarter Finals	Yokohama, Japan	Decision (unanimous)	3	3:00	7-3-1
2000-04-23	Loss	(France) Jérôme Le Banner	K-1 The Millennium	Yokohama, Japan	KO (left straight cross)	1	2:02	6-3-1
1999-04-25	Win	(Netherlands) Ernesto Hoost	K-1 Revenge '99	Yokohama, Japan	KO (right hook)	1	1:37	6-2-1
1998-12-13	Loss	(South Africa) Mike Bernardo	K-1 Grand Prix '98 Final Round Quarter Finals	Tokyo, Japan	KO (right overhand)	3	2:35	5-2-1
1998-09-27	Win	(United States) Rick Roufus	K-1 World Grand Prix '98 opening round	Osaka, Japan	KO (right low kick)	3	0:15	5-1-1
Qualifies for K-1 Grand Prix '98 Final.
1998-07-18	Win	(Netherlands) Peter Aerts	K-1 Dream '98	Nagoya, Japan	TKO (cut shin)	1	3:00	4-1-1
1998-04-09	Draw	(New Zealand) Ray Sefo	K-1 Kings '98	Yokohama, Japan	Decision draw	5	3:00	3-1-1
1997-11-09	Loss	(Netherlands) Ernesto Hoost	K-1 Grand Prix '97 Final Semi Finals	Tokyo, Japan	Decision (majority)	3	3:00	3-1
1997-11-09	Win	(Australia) Sam Greco	K-1 Grand Prix '97 Final Quarter Finals	Tokyo, Japan	KO (right hook)	1	0:15	3-0
1997-09-07	Win	(South Africa) Duane Van Der Merwe	K-1 Grand Prix '97 1st round	Osaka, Japan	KO (spinning back kick)	1	2:22	2-0
Qualifies for K-1 Grand Prix '97 Final.
1997-07-20	Win	(Switzerland) Andy Hug	K-1 Dream '97	Nagoya, Japan	KO (right hook)	1	2:37	1-0
Legend: Win Loss Draw/no contest Notes

== See also ==
- List of K-1 events
- List of K-1 champions
- List of male kickboxers
