= K-1 Grand Prix '97 Final =

K-1 martial arts event in 1997

- Promotion: K-1
- Date: November 9, 1997
- Venue: Tokyo Dome
- City: Tokyo, Japan
- Attendance: 54,500

Event chronology
K-1 Grand Prix '97 1st round	K-1 Grand Prix '97 Final	K-1 Kings '98

K-1 Grand Prix '97 Final was a kickboxing event promoted by the K-1 organization. It was the fifth K-1 World Grand Prix final involving eight of the world's best heavyweight fighters (+95 kg/209 lbs), with all bouts fought under K-1 Rules. The eight finalists had all qualified via elimination fights at the K-1 Grand Prix '97 1st round. Also on the card was a four-man tournament for featherweight kickboxers (57 kg/126 lbs) based in Japan and a local 'Super Fight', with all bouts fought under K-1 Rules. In total there were fourteen fighters at the event, representing seven countries.

The tournament winner was Ernesto Hoost who won his first K-1 Grand Prix final by defeating reigning champion Andy Hug by third round majority decision. The event was also notable for two of the fights in the quarter-finals - with both Francisco Filho and Andy Hug defeating their opponents by knockout at 15 seconds of the first record. It was held at the Tokyo Dome in Tokyo, Japan on Sunday, November 9, 1997 in front of a huge crowd of 54,500 spectators.

== K-1 Grand Prix '97 Final Tournament ==
K-1 Grand Prix '97 1st round
(Brazil) Francisco Filho	KO
(South Africa) Duane Van Der Merwe
(Australia) Sam Greco	KO
(United States) Jean-Claude Leuyer
(Netherlands) Ernesto Hoost	KO
(Germany) Stefan Leko
(France) Jérôme Le Banner	TKO
(United States) Rick Roufus
(Netherlands) Peter Aerts	KO
(United States) James Warring
(South Africa) Mike Bernardo	TKO
(Croatia) Branko Cikatić
(Canada) Pierre Guenette
(Switzerland) Andy Hug	TKO
(Canada) Jean Riviere
(Japan) Masaaki Satake	DEC

Quarter-finals
(Brazil) Francisco Filho	KO
(Australia) Sam Greco
(Netherlands) Ernesto Hoost	KO
(France) Jérôme Le Banner
(Netherlands) Peter Aerts	TKO
(South Africa) Mike Bernardo
(Switzerland) Andy Hug	KO
(Japan) Masaaki Satake

Semi-finals
(Brazil) Francisco Filho
(Netherlands) Ernesto Hoost	DEC
(Netherlands) Peter Aerts
(Switzerland) Andy Hug	DEC

Final
(Netherlands) Ernesto Hoost	DEC
(Switzerland) Andy Hug

== K-1 Japan Featherweight Grand Prix Tournament ==
Semi-finals
(Japan) Kenichi Sato	TKO
(Japan) Suguru Yamanouchi
(Japan) Kensaku Maeda
(Japan) Takehiro Murahama	DEC

Final
(Japan) Kenichi Sato
(Japan) Takehiro Murahama	DEC

== Results ==
K-1 Grand Prix '97 Final Results
K-1 Japan Featherweight Grand Prix Semi-finals: K-1 Rules / 3Min. 3R Ext.1R
(Japan) Kenichi Sato def. Suguru Yamanouchi (Japan)
Sato defeated Yamanouchi by TKO at 2:10 of the 1st round.
(Japan) Kensaku Maeda def. Takehiro Murahama (Japan)
Murahama defeated Maeda by 3rd round Unanimous Decision 3-0 (30-27, 30-28, 30-27).
K-1 Grand Prix Quarter-finals: K-1 Rules / 3Min. 3R Ext.1R
(Brazil) Francisco Filho def. Sam Greco (Australia)
Filho defeated Greco by KO (Right Hook) at 0:15 of the 1st round.
(Netherlands) Ernesto Hoost def. Jérôme Le Banner (France)
Hoost defeated Le Banner by KO (Right Hook) at 1:15 of the 1st round.
(Netherlands) Peter Aerts def. Mike Bernardo (South Africa)
Aerts defeated Bernardo by TKO (Right Straight to the Body) at 1:17 of the 3rd round.
(Switzerland) Andy Hug def. Masaaki Satake (Japan)
Hug defeated Satake by KO (Left High Kick) at 0:15 of the 1st round.
K-1 Japan Featherweight Grand Prix Final: K-1 Rules / 3Min. 3R Ext.2R
(Japan) Takehiro Murahama def. Kenichi Sato (Japan)
Murahama defeated Sato by 3rd round Unanimous Decision 3-0.
K-1 Grand Prix Semi-finals: K-1 Rules / 3Min. 3R Ext.1R
(Netherlands) Ernesto Hoost def. Francisco Filho (Brazil)
Hoost defeated Filho by 3rd round Majority Decision 2-0 (30-29, 30-30, 30-29).
(Switzerland) Andy Hug def. Peter Aerts (Netherlands)
Hug defeated Aerts by 3rd round Unanimous Decision 3-0 (30-29, 30-28, 30-28).
Super Fight: K-1 Rules / 3Min. 5R
(Japan) Taiei Kin def. Taro Minato (Japan)
Kin defeated Minato by 5th round Unanimous Decision 3-0 (50-48, 50-47, 50-47).
K-1 Grand Prix Final: K-1 Rules / 3Min. 3R Ext.2R
(Netherlands) Ernesto Hoost def. Andy Hug (Switzerland)
Hoost defeated Hug by 3rd round Majority Decision 2-0 (30-29, 30-29, 30-30).

== See also ==
- List of K-1 events
- List of male kickboxers
