= Michael Thompson (karateka) =

Karateka and kickboxer

- Born: 23 June 1962 (age 64); London, England
- Other names: Black Panther
- Nationality: English
- Height: 1.81 m (5 ft 11 1/2 in)
- Weight: 88.1 kg (194 lb; 13.87 st)
- Division: Cruiserweight; Heavyweight
- Style: Kickboxing, Kyokushin Karate, Seidokaikan Karate
- Stance: Orthodox
- Fighting out of: Lucerne, Switzerland
- Team: Team Andy Hug
- Rank: black belt in Kyokushin
- Years active: 1982-1999

Kickboxing record
- Total: 11
- Wins: 6
- By knockout: 3
- Losses: 5
- By knockout: 4

Michael Thompson
Medal record

Representing England

Men's Kyokushin

British Open
Gold medal – first place	London 1982	Open
Bronze medal – third place	London 1983	Open
Gold medal – first place	London 1984	Open
Bronze medal – third place	London 1985	Open
Gold medal – first place	London 1986	Open
Gold medal – first place	London 1990	Open

Commonwealth Championships
Gold medal – first place	Sydney 1988	+90 kg

European Championships
Bronze medal – third place	1982	+90 kg
Silver medal – second place	1987	+90 kg
Silver medal – second place	1989	+90 kg
Gold medal – first place	1991	+90 kg

Ibutz Oyama Cup
Silver medal – second place	Budapest 1983	+90kg
Bronze medal – third place	Budapest 1986	+90kg

World Open
Bronze medal – third place	Tokyo 1987	Open

Men's Seido

World Cup
Silver medal – second place	Osaka 1994	Open

Michael Thompson (born 23 June 1962) is an English former karateka and kickboxer who competed in the cruiserweight and heavyweight division. After a long and distinguished career in Kyokushin, in which he won the British Open four times, the Commonwealth Championships in 1988 and the European Championships in 1991 as well as competing three times in the World Open, Thompson later switched to Seidokaikan and reached the final of the 1994 Seidokaikan Karate World Cup. During his time as a Seidokaikan competitor, he also fought as a professional kickboxer in K-1, amassing a 6–5 record and becoming the WKA European Super Cruiserweight Champion.

== Career ==
Michael Thompson established himself as one of the United Kingdom's best Kyokushin fighters during the 1980s, winning the British Open four times (1982, 1984, 1986 and 1990) and finishing in third place twice (1983 and 1985). He also medaled at the European Championships three times, taking bronze in 1982 and silver in 1987 and 1989 before eventually winning the tournament at +90 kg/198 lb in 1991. As well as winning the inaugural Commonwealth Championships in 1988, Thompson competed in the Kyokushin World Open on three occasions. In his best showing in the tournament, he made it to the semi-finals at the 1987 edition, losing out to Shokei Matsui.

After transitioning to Seidokaikan in 1993, Thompson fought his first match against Taiei Kin at the K-1 Grand Prix '93 in Tokyo, Japan on 30 April 1993, losing by majority decision after two extension rounds were needed to separate the pair. He bounced back with a first round knockout of Nobuaki Kakuda at K-1 Sanctuary III in Osaka, Japan on 25 June 1993. Entering the 1993 Seidokaikan Karate World Cup on 3 October 1993, Thompson rematched Kakuda in the tournament's opening stage and repeated his performance to score another first-round KO. It was another familiar foe and outcome in the quarter-finals, as Taiei Kin again beat him by an extension round decision to eliminate him from the competition.

Thompson then signed with K-1 and made his professional kickboxing debut on 4 March 1994, stopping Gary Sandland with a spinning back kick in round four at K-1 Challenge. The following month, he was invited to compete in the K-1 Grand Prix '94, held on 30 April 1994 in Tokyo. He lost to Masaaki Satake via technical knockout due to a cut in round three of their quarter-final match. Returning at K-1 Revenge in Yokohama, Japan on 18 September 1994, Thompson knocked out Muay Thai exponent Changpuek Kiatsongrit with a lighting-quick spinning back kick just two seconds into the third round.

Competing in his last major full contact karate tournament, Michael Thompson made it to the final of the 1994 Seidokaikan Karate World Cup on 2 October 1994. Following wins over Wataru Uchida, Eiji Matsumoto and Kenneth Felter, respectively, he was stopped with a body kick from Sam Greco inside the first round of the tournament championship match. In his next outing, he beat Rene Papais on points in a karate match at K-1 Fight Night in Zurich, Switzerland on 10 June 1995.

He soon made his way back to the kickboxing ring and faced Peter Aerts in a non-tournament bout at the K-3 Grand Prix '95 in Nagoya, Japan on 16 July 1995. He was outmatched in the fight, getting beat around the ring before being stopped in round two. In another tough matchup, Thompson was dropped by Ernesto Hoost a total of four times over two rounds, forcing the referee to call a stoppage at K-1 Revenge II in Yokohama on 3 September 1995.

Upon his return to Seidokaikan karate, Thompson lost his third consecutive fight as he dropped a unanimous decision to Andy Hug in a one-off match at the 1995 Seidokaikan Karate World Cup on 8 October 1995. This would be his last appearance under karate rules as he would spend the remainder of his career as a kickboxer and actually went on to train with Andy Hug at his training complex in Lucerne, Switzerland.

On 9 December 1995, Thompson defeated Pedro Rizzo via cut TKO in round three at K-1 Hercules in Nagoya. He was unable to stay out of the losing column for long, however, as he was TKO'd inside the first round by Duane van der Merwe at the K-1 Grand Prix '96 Opening Battle in Yokohama on 10 March 1996. Heavily outweighed and giving up 19 cm/1 ft in height, he was pushed into a corner and floored with an uppercut in the opening seconds and suffered three more knockdowns before the referee called the fight off.

He went on a three fight winning streak over the next two years and kicked it off by TKOing Attila Fusco with third round low kicks at K-1 Fight Night II in Zurich on 2 June 1996 to capture the German's WKA European Super Cruiserweight (-90 kg/198.4 lb) Kickboxing Championship. He followed this up with back-to-back wins over Musashi; the first a unanimous decision at K-1 Fight Night '97 in Zurich on 7 June 1997, and the second a majority decision at K-1 Japan '98 Kamikaze in Tokyo on 28 October 1998. In his last fight before retirement, Thompson lost to Michael McDonald by way of unanimous decision at K-1 Fight Night '99 in Zurich on 6 June 1999.

== Championships and awards ==
=== Karate ===
- Kyokushin British Open
  - 7th Kyokushin British Open Champion (gold)
  - 8th Kyokushin British Open 3rd Place (bronze)
  - 9th Kyokushin British Open Champion (gold)
  - 10th Kyokushin British Open 3rd Place (bronze)
  - 11th Kyokushin British Open Champion (gold)
  - 15th Kyokushin British Open Champion (gold)
- Kyokushin World Open
  - 4th Kyokushin World Open 3rd Place (bronze)
- Commonwealth Kyokushin Championships
  - 1st Commonwealth Kyokushin Championships +90 kg/198 lb Champion (gold)
- European Kyokushin Championships
  - 2nd European Kyokushin Championships +90 kg/198 lb 3rd Place (bronze)
  - 4th European Kyokushin Championships +90 kg/198 lb Runner-up (silver)
  - 5th European Kyokushin Championships +90 kg/198 lb Runner-up (silver)
  - 6th European Kyokushin Championships +90 kg/198 lb Champion (gold)
- Ibutz Oyama Cup
  - 1st Ibutz Oyama Cup +90 kg/198 lb Runner-up (silver)
  - 3rd Ibutz Oyama Cup +90 kg/198 lb 3rd Place (bronze)
- Seidokaikan Karate World Cup
  - 1994 Seidokaikan Karate World Cup Runner-up (silver)

=== Kickboxing ===
- World Kickboxing Association
  - WKA European Super Cruiserweight (-90 kg/198.4 lb) Kickboxing Championship

== Karate record ==
Kyokushin record
Date	Result	Opponent	Event	Location	Method	Round	Time
1987-11-00	Loss	(Japan) Shokei Matsui	4th Kyokushin World Open, Semi Finals	Tokyo, Japan
1987-11-00	Win	(Japan) Hiroki Kurosawa	4th Kyokushin World Open, Quarter Finals	Tokyo, Japan	Default
1987-11-00	Win	(Japan) Kenji Midori	4th Kyokushin World Open, Fifth Round	Tokyo, Japan
1987-11-00	Win	(Japan) H. Hashizume	4th Kyokushin World Open, Fourth Round	Tokyo, Japan
1987-11-00	Win	(Spain) A. Guerrero	4th Kyokushin World Open, Third Round	Tokyo, Japan
1987-11-00	Win	(Venezuela) Adolfo Corredor	4th Kyokushin World Open, Second Round	Tokyo, Japan
1987-11-00	Win	(New Zealand) Stephen Takiwa	4th Kyokushin World Open, First Round	Tokyo, Japan

Seidokaikan record
Date	Result	Opponent	Event	Location	Method	Round	Time
1995-10-08	Loss	(Switzerland) Andy Hug	1995 Seidokaikan Karate World Cup	Osaka, Japan	Decision (unanimous)	3	3:00
1995-06-10	Win	(Switzerland) Rene Papais	K-1 Fight Night	Zurich, Switzerland	Decision	3	3:00
1994-10-02	Loss	(Australia) Sam Greco	1994 Seidokaikan Karate World Cup, Final	Osaka, Japan	KO (right body punch)	1	2:16
For the 1994 Seidokaikan Karate World Cup Championship.
1994-10-02	Win	(Netherlands) Kenneth Felter	1994 Seidokaikan Karate World Cup, Semi Finals	Osaka, Japan	Decision (majority)	3	3:00
1994-10-02	Win	(Japan) Eiji Matsumoto	1994 Seidokaikan Karate World Cup, Quarter Finals	Osaka, Japan	Decision (unanimous)	3	3:00
1994-10-02	Win	(Japan) Wataru Uchida	1994 Seidokaikan Karate World Cup, First Round	Osaka, Japan	KO (left knee)
1993-10-03	Loss	(Japan) Taiei Kin	1993 Seidokaikan Karate World Cup, Quarter Finals	Osaka, Japan	Extension round decision	4	3:00
1993-10-03	Win	(Japan) Nobuaki Kakuda	1993 Seidokaikan Karate World Cup, First Round	Osaka, Japan	KO (right high kick)	1	1:40
1993-06-25	Win	(Japan) Nobuaki Kakuda	K-1 Sanctuary III	Osaka, Japan	KO (left high kick)	1	0:47
1993-04-30	Loss	(Japan) Taiei Kin	K-1 Grand Prix '93	Tokyo, Japan	Extension round decision (majority)	5	3:00

Legend: Win Loss Draw/No contest Notes

== Kickboxing record ==
6 wins (3 KOs), 5 losses, 0 draws
Date	Result	Opponent	Event	Location	Method	Round	Time	Record
1999-06-05	Loss	(Canada) Michael McDonald	K-1 Fight Night '99	Zurich, Switzerland	Decision (unanimous)	5	3:00	6-5
1998-10-28	Win	(Japan) Musashi	K-1 Japan '98 Kamikaze	Tokyo, Japan	Decision (majority)	5	3:00	6-4
1997-06-07	Win	(Japan) Musashi	K-1 Fight Night '97	Zurich, Switzerland	Decision (unanimous)	5	3:00	5-4
1996-06-02	Win	(Germany) Attila Fusko	K-1 Fight Night II	Zurich, Switzerland	TKO (left low kick)	3	1:20	4-4
Wins the WKA European Super Cruiserweight (-90 kg/198.4 lb) Kickboxing Championship.
1996-03-10	Loss	(South Africa) Duane van der Merwe	K-1 Grand Prix '96 Opening Battle	Yokohama, Japan	TKO (right hook)	1	2:10	3-4
1995-12-09	Win	(Brazil) Pedro Rizzo	K-1 Hercules	Nagoya, Japan	TKO (cut)	3	1:19	3-3
1995-09-03	Loss	(Netherlands) Ernesto Hoost	K-1 Revenge II	Yokohama, Japan	TKO (left knee)	2	2:45	2-3
1995-07-16	Loss	(Netherlands) Peter Aerts	K-3 Grand Prix '95	Nagoya, Japan	KO (punches and knees)	2	0:40	2-2
1994-09-18	Win	(Thailand) Changpuek Kiatsongrit	K-1 Revenge	Yokohama, Japan	KO (spinning back kick)	3	0:02	2-1
1994-04-30	Loss	(Japan) Masaaki Satake	K-1 Grand Prix '94, Quarter Finals	Tokyo, Japan	TKO (cut)	3	0:34	1-1
1994-03-04	Win	(England) Gary Sandland	K-1 Challenge	Tokyo, Japan	KO (spinning back kick)	4	1:10	1-0

Legend: Win Loss Draw/No contest Notes
