= Andy Hug =

Swiss karateka and kickboxer

- Born: Andreas Hug; September 7, 1964; Zurich, Switzerland
- Died: August 24, 2000 (aged 35); Bunkyō, Tokyo, Japan
- Other names: The Blue-eyed Samurai; Iron Man (Tetsujin in Japanese); Mr. K-1; Typhoon
- Height: 1.80 m (5 ft 11 in)
- Weight: 97.7 kg (215 lb; 15.39 st)
- Division: Heavyweight
- Reach: 1.83 m (72 in)
- Style: Kyokushin karate, seidokaikan, kick boxing
- Stance: Southpaw
- Fighting out of: Lucerne, Switzerland
- Team: Team Andy Hug; Dojo Kamakura; Hiranaka Boxing School Gym
- Rank: 5th degree black belt in Kyokushin Karate
- Years active: 1977–2000

Kickboxing record
- Total: 47
- Wins: 37
- By knockout: 21
- Losses: 9
- By knockout: 6
- Draws: 1

Other information
- Spouse: Ilona Hug (1993–2000)
- Notable students: Xhavit Bajrami; Björn Bregy, Petar Majstorović; Michael McDonald

Andreas Hug (7 September 1964 – 24 August 2000) was a Swiss karateka and kickboxer who competed in the heavyweight division. Considered to be one of the greatest heavyweight kickboxers of all time, Hug was renowned for his ability to execute numerous kicking techniques rarely seen in high-level competition. Although he was usually smaller than his opponents, standing at 1.80 m (5 ft 11 in) and being barely a heavyweight, weighing around 98.0 kg (216.1 lb; 15.43 st) in his prime, he made up for his lack of size with his athleticism and speed. A southpaw, his trademark kicks included the axe kick and the "Hug Tornado", a low spinning heel kick targeting his opponents' thighs.

Raised in Wohlen, Aargau, Hug was a keen footballer in his youth. He gave up the sport to pursue Kyokushin karate which he began practicing at ten years old. Beginning his full contact karate career in the 80 kg/176 lb middleweight division, he rose to prominence in the late 1970s and early 1980s by winning numerous regional tournaments around Europe and made the transition to heavyweight in 1984. That same year, he competed in the Kyokushin World Open, knockdown karate's most prestigious competition, for the first time and made it to the fourth round where he was eliminated by Shokei Matsui. Returning to Europe, he won his first major title in the form of the 3rd European Championships in 1985 before entering World Open again in 1987. He became the first non-Japanese fighter to make it to the final of the competition but again lost to Shokei Matsui. Another European Championships win would follow in 1989 and he fought in his third and final World Open in 1991, losing a controversial bout to Francisco Filho in the third round.

Having become a popular fighter in Japan due to his technical diversity, aesthetics, tactics and strength, Hug made the switch from Kyokushinkaikan to Seidokaikan in 1992, completing the step from being an amateur to becoming a professional fighter and star in Japan. After winning the 1992 Seidokaikan Karate World Cup, beating Taiei Kin in the final, and finishing as runner-up to Masaaki Satake in the 1993 edition, Hug transitioned to K-1 kickboxing, scoring a first round knockout of Ryuji Murakami in his professional debut at K-1 Andy's Glove in November 1993. After a breakout win over K-1 Grand Prix '93 Champion Branko Cikatić in March 1994, Hug entered the K-1 Grand Prix '94 a month later as one of the tournament favourites but was upset by Patrick Smith via first round stoppage in the quarter-finals. Undeterred, Hug continued to improve his skills for the kickboxing ring and rebounded by winning the Universal Kickboxing Federation (UKF) World Super Heavyweight Championship in December 1994 when he knocked out Rob van Esdonk. He suffered another setback at the K-1 Grand Prix '95 qualifying round when he was stopped by Mike Bernardo but he would have his revenge the following year at the K-1 Grand Prix '96 when he won the tournament by finishing Bernardo with the "Hug Tornado" in the final. He continued to be one of K-1's top contenders in the following years, reaching the final of the K-1 World Grand Prix twice more (in 1997 and 1998) and becoming a three-time world champion by taking the WMTC and WKA titles under Muay Thai rules.

In early August 2000, Hug started feeling unwell in Switzerland. On August 17, while training in Japan, he was given a diagnosis of acute leukemia. He died, aged 35, a week later in Tokyo, the day after it was made public that he was comatose. Hug's sudden death shocked the martial arts world. His legacy remains in kickboxing and knockdown karate, as well as one of the greatest heavyweights in the history of both sports. Hug was the highest paid kickboxer in the world at one point and his matches in his native Switzerland, where he posted a perfect 6–0 record, drew a larger television audience than the tennis matches of Martina Hingis and the games of the Switzerland national football team. In addition to his in-ring accomplishments, he was also known for his articulation, humility and strong work ethic. Hug was ranked at #79 on The Top 100 Historical Persons in Japan, a television program aired on Nippon Television on May 7, 2006, which featured the results of a survey that asked Japanese people to choose their favorite great person from history.

His skill was such that some experts say that if karate had been an Olympic sport in his day, Hug would have consistently been a favorite for the gold medal.

== Early life ==
Andreas Hug was born in Zurich, Switzerland on 7 September 1964. His father Arthur was a Swiss of French and Swiss descent and was a French Foreign Legionnaire. He died in Thailand under mysterious circumstances without seeing his son. Hug's mother, Madelaine Hug-Baumann, was German. She was forced to pursue gainful employment. Unable to care for Andy, she put him up for adoption and he spent the first three years of his life in an orphanage until his care was taken over by his grandparents along with his brother, Charly, and sister, Fabienne. His grandmother, Fridy, and grandfather, Herrmann Baumann, a bricklayer, raised them in Wohlen in the Canton of Aargau.

Hug began playing association football competitively at the age of six and went on to represent the Switzerland national under-16 football team. His home situation made him a target for bullying and at ten years old, he started practising Kyokushinkai karate at Wohlen karate school under Werner Schenker despite strong opposition from his grandfather initially. His grandmother saw his passion for the art and eventually convinced the grandfather to relent. By thirteen, he began to show promise as a karateka by winning numerous beginners' karate tournaments and his grandparents eventually forced him to decide between pursuing football and karate, since they were no longer in a position to pay for both. He chose karate and at fifteen won the 1979 Swiss Oyama Cup, a national Kyokushin competition. Although full contact karate tournaments carried with them a minimum age of twenty, he showed so much potential as one of the country's biggest prospects that the Swiss Karate Federation allowed Hug to compete nonetheless.

Following his breakout performance in the Oyama Cup, Hug earned himself a place on the Swiss national Kyokushin team and then became the co-founder of a dojo in Bremgarten aged seventeen. He completed his butchery apprenticeship in 1984 and took a job in Wohlen's main wholesale butchery. His need for time off work regularly to compete in tournaments and occasional injuries which hindered his work performance meant that a shadow was cast over his working relationship and he was released from his contract by mutual agreement in 1986.

== Career ==
=== Kyokushin career (1977–1991) ===
After winning a number of beginners' karate competitions, Hug was selected to represent the Wohlen Karate School during the National Team Championships in November 1977. His breakthrough performance came at the Swiss national Oyama Cup in 1979 at the age of fifteen when he defeated several opponents much older than himself to take the tournament crown. In 1981, Hug had an upsurge in competition as he was part of the Swiss team that defeated the Dutch in the finals to win the 4 Countries Team Tournament and recorded his first international success by taking a bronze medal at the 5th Dutch Kyokushin Championships in the 80 kg/176 lb middleweight division in Weert, Netherlands as he lost out to Koen Scharrenberg in the semi-finals. He also won the Swiss Oyama Cup for a second time that year, beating Heinz Muntweiler in the final, before further establishing himself as the country's top Kyokushin fighter by winning the 1982 Swiss Championships at middleweight. After reaching the round of sixteen in both the 2nd European Championships and the 6th Dutch Open, being eliminated by Jean-Pierre Louisset and Kenneth Felter respectively, Hug closed out the year by being crowned champion at the 1st Ibusz Oyama Cup in Budapest, Hungary where he defeated Mark Niedziokka in the final.

Hug again made it to the last sixteen at the 7th Dutch Open in 1983 and in 1984, he moved up to the heavyweight class with instant success, winning the Swiss nationals. In January 1984, he competed in the 3rd edition of the Kyokushin World Open, knockdown karate's most prestigious competition held once every four years. Hug was able to battle his way through and reached the final sixteen but lost to Shokei Matsui on points. 1985 was another successful year for Hug as he won the Ibusz Oyama Cup for the second time and the Swiss nationals for the third time before taking his most notable prize to date when he outpointed Klaus Rex in the final to win the 3rd edition of the European Championships in Barcelona, Spain in December of that year.

At the 11th British Open in London, England in 1986, he was eliminated at the semi-final round by Michael Thompson. They rematched at the same stage of the 4th European Kyokushin Championships in Katowice, Poland in May 1987 with the Thompson again coming out on top and forcing Hug to relinquish his title as European champion. Hug returned to the World Open in November 1987 and made history by becoming the first gaijin to reach the final of the tournament, booking his place with a judges' decision win over Akira Masuda in the semis. There, he again faced Shokei Matsui and lost to him by decision once again.

With his status as an elite Kyokushin fighter secured, Hug began to compete more sparingly over the next few years. He won the 1st Sursee Cup in 1988, defeating Kenji Midori in the final, and became a two-time European champion in 1989 when he beat Michael Thompson to win the 5th European Championships in Budapest.

After an uneventful year in 1990, Hug returned to the spotlight in '91 when he reached the final of the 6th European Championships in Budapest only to lose to Michael Thompson once more. The 5th World Championships also took place that year at the Budokan in Tokyo, Japan. In his third fight, Hug came up against Francisco Filho. At the end of the round, as the bell rang, Filho landed a mawashi geri on the side of Hug's head which left him unconscious on the floor. Despite protest from the Swiss camp, it was later confirmed that Filho's kick had indeed struck after the bell rang, but he had started his move before the time was up and Filho was declared the winner.

=== Switch to Seidokaikan and entry into K-1 (1992–1993) ===
Having been fighting in Japan with success for a number of years, Hug became popular in the country. The fans were impressed by his technical diversity, aesthetics, tactics and strength. In 1992, he made the switch from Kyokushinkaikan to Seidokaikan, completing the step from being an amateur to becoming a professional fighter and star in Japan. He debuted as a Seidokaikan karate fighter on July 30, 1992, defeating Toshiyuki Yanagisawa on points at the Seidokaikan Kakutogi Olympics II. He competed in and won the 1992 Seidokaikan Karate World Cup on October 2, 1992, overcoming Taiei Kin in the final. On April 30, 1993, Hug fought in K-1 for the first time, albeit under Seidokaikan rules, in a rematch with Nobuaki Kakuda at the K-1 Grand Prix '93. The pair previously met at the second round of the 1992 Seidokaikan Karate World Cup with Hug winning by ippon and the Swiss repeated his performance by stopping Kakuda with a knee strike from the Thai clinch in round two.

Facing another of his previous opponents from the 1992 Seidokaikan Karate World Cup, he beat Minoru Fujita by decision at K-1 Sanctuary III on June 25, 1993. Undefeated as a Seidokaikan fighter, Hug entered the K-1 Illusion 1993 Karate World Cup on October 2, 1993, defeating Yoshinori Arata, Changpuek Kiatsongrit and Toshiyuki Atokawa on his way to the final where he met Masaaki Satake. After four overtime rounds, the bout went to sudden death where Hug lost in a tameshiwari contest.

Following the tournament, Hug began his transition from full contact karate to kickboxing and, already a part of K-1's roster, made his debut against Ryuji Murakami at K-1 Andy's Glove on November 15, 1993. He won by first round knockout, dropping Murakami with a body kick early before finishing him off with a right hook soon after. In a non-tournament attraction at the K-2 Grand Prix '93 on December 19, 1993, Hug faced Eric Albert and hurt the Frenchman seconds after the opening bell when he rushed out and landed his trademark axe kick on his face. After a prolonged beating and a spinning back kick knockdown, Hug was able to put Albert away with a series of punches late in round two. In just his third outing in the kickboxing ring, he took a considerable step up in class as he faced off with the reigning K-1 World Grand Prix champion Branko Cikatić at K-1 Challenge on March 3, 1994. Struggling early due to his lack of boxing prowess, Hug received a standing eight count from referee Genshu Igari in round one after being rocked by an uppercut from Cikatić. Hug, however, came into his own as the fight went on, utilizing his kicking game to better effect and boxing from the inside, even forcing a count of his own on the Croatian before winning a unanimous decision after five rounds.

=== Struggles at the World Grand Prix (1994–1995) ===
With the win over Branko Cikatić, Andy Hug proved himself to be competent kickboxer and was entered into his first K-1 World Grand Prix, fighting at the K-1 Grand Prix '94 on April 30, 1994, where he faced Patrick Smith in the quarter-finals. Hug struggled with Smith's aggression and punch-heavy style, suffering three knockdowns in nineteen seconds and losing by technical knockout. Some pundits, most notoriously Dave Meltzer, have expressed their belief that Hug's loss was a fight fixed in order to increase Smith's popularity. Hug had problems with his gumshield as his molars didn't clamp down on it properly and he was instead pinching it with his incisors. In time, however, the K-1 doctors discovered the dental problems and fitted him with a mouthpiece that would provide standard protection. The rematch between Andy Hug and Pat Smith took place at K-1 Revenge on September 18, 1994, and the American again opened with an axe kick just as he done in the first fight. This time, however, Hug countered with the "Hug Tornado", sweeping Smith to the canvas. As the fight went on, Hug weathered Smith's aggressive start and completed his revenge when he knocked him unconscious with a knee at the 0:56 mark of round one. In a kickboxing match at the 1994 Seidokaikan Karate World Cup on October 2, 1994, he scored a third round liver kick knockout of Duke Roufus before closing out the year by winning the UKF World Super Heavyweight Championship with a spectacular fourth-round KO win against Rob van Esdonk at K-1 Legend on December 10, 1994.

On March 3, 1995, Hug entered the 1995 Grand Prix at the round of sixteen qualifier where his rivalry with Mike Bernardo began. Both fighters traded heavy shots with Bernardo seemingly getting the better until Hug dropped him with a high kick towards the end of the first round. The South African boxer continued to pile on the pressure, however, and in the third, knocked Hug down with a left hook shortly followed by a standing eight count. Finally, he forced Hug into a corner and delivered a relentless beating on the Swiss karateka until referee Nobuaki Kakuda finally stopped the bout after a prolonged barrage of unanswered punches. Hug had a quick turnaround, as he was back in the ring on May 4, 1995, scoring a forty-five second knockout over Peter Kramer in a K-1 World Grand Prix 1995 non-tournament affair. On June 10, 1995, Hug made the first defence of his UKF title against Dennis Lane at K-1 Fight Night in Zurich, the first K-1 event held in Switzerland. In a rather one-sided fight, Andy Hug knocked Lane down twice in the first two rounds before the American quit on his stool.

Hug would then lose in his next two outings, firstly to Ernesto Hoost by majority decision at the K-3 Grand Prix '95 on July 16, 1995, and then Mike Bernardo by KO in a rematch at K-1 Revenge II on September 3, 1995. The fight was even going into the latter stages of round two when Bernardo landed a right hook which sent Hug to the canvas. He was able to make it back to his feet but was clearly on wobbly legs and the referee in charge, Genshu Igari, stopped him from taking any more damage than was necessary.

Sitting on a less-than-spectacular 8–4 record and having lost in his previous two matches, Hug was struggling with depression and felt at odds with the sport, questioning whether or not he had it in him to continue at the elite level. He persisted, however, after a rejuvenating unanimous decision win over Jérôme Le Banner at K-1 Hercules on December 9, 1995, and went into the 1996 campaign in good form.

=== Winning the K-1 World Grand Prix Championship (1996) ===
Kicking off the most successful year of his career, Andy Hug demolished an overmatched Bart Vale at the K-1 Grand Prix '96 Opening Battle on March 3, 1996, to qualify for the K-1 Grand Prix '96 which was held two months later on May 6. After making short work of Duane van der Merwe with a KO inside forty seconds at the tournament's quarter-final stage, awaiting Hug was Ernesto Hoost in the semis and the pair had an epic battle considered to be one of the greatest matches in K-1's history. A back-and-forth fight in which Hoost delivered punishing low kicks throughout and both fighters traded heavily in the clinch, the judges ruled it a split draw after the regulation three rounds and so it went to an extension round to decide the winner only for it again to be scored a majority draw. Finally, after five grueling rounds, Hug was ruled the victor by split decision. In the final, he went up against Mike Bernardo, the South African power puncher who had knocked him out twice previously. It was not to be three-in-a-row for Bernardo, however, as a combination of fatigue and Hug's low kicks began to wear him down in the second round. Bernardo went down from a roundhouse kick to his left thigh but got back to his feet only for Hug to deliver one of the most spectacular stoppages of the 1990s, landing the "Hug Tornado" on Bernardo's already-injured left leg to put him away and clinch the coveted K-1 World Grand Prix Championship.

Hug returned to Zurich to face Muay Thai stylist Sadau Kiatsongrit in his second and last defence of the UKF super heavyweight title at K-1 Fight Night II on June 2, 1996, dispatching the Thai with a right hook at the end of round two after flooring him moments earlier. At September 1's K-1 Revenge '96, Hug fought the first of his own six Muay Thai matches, challenging Stan Longinidis for his WMTC World Super Heavyweight (+95 kg/209 lb) Championship. They exchanged heavy strikes in a close first round but Hug then went out and severely outgunned Longinidis in the second, knocking his Australian opponent down with a high kick before viciously finishing the job with a left cross after he beat the count.

At K-1 Star Wars '96 on October 18, 1996, Andy Hug beat Masaaki Satake by unanimous decision in a rather lackluster rematch of the 1993 Seidokaikan Karate World Cup final to win his third title in the span on five months, the WKA World Super Heavyweight (+95 kg/209 lb) Muay Thai strap. He finished out the year a perfect 8–0 with another unanimous decision win, this time over fellow karateka Musashi at K-1 Hercules '96 on December 8, 1996.

=== Twice consecutive Grand Prix runner-up (1997–1998) ===
Andy Hug's eight fight win streak was brought to an end by then-two-time K-1 Grand Prix champion Peter Aerts in the first of their four meetings at K-1 Kings '97 on March 16, 1997. Soundly beaten inside the opening stanza, he was hurt by Aerts' right hand a number of times before being put away with a combination of an uppercut and a knee. He then fought to a five-round split draw with Sam Greco at K-1 Braves '97 on April 29, 1997, before having his fourth and final battle with Mike Bernardo in his first WKA world super heavyweight title defence on June 7, 1997, at K-1 Fight Night '97 in Zurich. Bernardo registered a knockdown of Hug with a powerful left hook at the end of round two but it was not enough as Hug took the unanimous decision in the only fight of their 2–2 series to go the distance.

On July 20, 1997, at K-1 Dream '97, Andy Hug met Francisco Filho in a rematch almost six years in the making; Filho had KO'd Hug at the third round of the 5th Kyokushin World Open back in 1991. The fight started tense and cagey, with little to no action for the majority of round one until Filho, making his debut under kickboxing rules, landed the decisive strike, a perfectly timed counter right hook, which sent Hug crashing to the canvas in a state of unconsciousness at the 2:37 mark.

With a record of 1-2-1 that year, he entered the Grand Prix in relatively poor form but qualified for the final eight nonetheless with a win over Pierre Guénette at K-1 Grand Prix '97 1st round on September 7, 1997, putting away the Canadian taekwondo exponent with three knockdowns inside the first round. The round of eight went down on November 9 and saw the rubber match between Andy Hug and Masaaki Satake in the quarter-finals go just fifteen seconds as the Swiss dispatched his Japanese foe with a high kick. In the semis, Hug drew Peter Aerts and avenged his loss to the Dutchman eight months prior with a unanimous judges' decision victory. Having fought his way through to the final, he then lost to Ernesto Hoost by unanimous decision in the third of their four matches.

He rebounded with a unanimous decision victory over Curtis Schuster on April 9, 1998, at K-1 Kings '98 and then had his third meeting with Peter Aerts in Zurich on June 6, 1998, at K-1 Fight Night '98. With his WKA World Super Heavyweight Muay Thai Championship on the line, Hug outfought Aerts over the five rounds to take a unanimous decision and make the second defence of his belt. On August 7, 1998, at the K-1 USA Grand Prix '98, K-1's first venture into the United States and Las Vegas, he dismantled Mike LaBree inside the first round, forcing him into a corner before stopping him with a flurry of punches immediately followed by a thudding low kick.

The 1998 Grand Prix began on September 27 with the round of sixteen at the K-1 World Grand Prix '98 opening round where Hug faced off with Mark Russell, one of the few opponents in his career who he had a size advantage over. He scored a knockdown over England's Russell in the latter part of round one and finished the job in two with a second consecutive leg kick stoppage. In a tune-up fight ahead of the Grand Prix finals, Hug KO'd Masaaki Miyamoto with a spinning backfist moments after dropping him with the same technique at K-1 Japan '98 Kamikaze on October 28, 1998.

At the K-1 Grand Prix '98 Final Round on December 13, 1998, he TKO'd Ray Sefo in the second round of their quarter-final match, knocking the New Zealander down twice with aggressive boxing combinations and forcing referee Nobuaki Kakuda to stop the fight, before securing a majority decision against Sam Greco in the semis, a rematch of their draw a year earlier. There was also some controversy in the fight as both men continued to fight after the bell rung at the end of round two, with Greco knocking Hug to the canvas with a right hand. The tournament final saw Andy Hug draw Peter Aerts once again and in their fourth and final match against one another, Aerts emerged victorious via head kick knockout in the first round.

=== Later career and coaching (1999–2000) ===
1999 was the most successful year for K-1 since its inception. Record numbers of spectators were recorded for all tournaments. Around this time, Hug also turned his hand to training other competitors at his facility in Lucerne, Switzerland, bringing through the next generation of Swiss heavyweights in Xhavit Bajrami, Björn Bregy and Petar Majstorović as well as foreign talent such as Michael McDonald.

He began 1999 in devastating fashion, knocking out Tsuyoshi Nakasako with a second round spinning heel kick at K-1 Rising Sun '99 on February 3 and scoring a second TKO over Ray Sefo in their rematch at K-1 Revenge '99 on April 25 when the New Zealander's corner pulled their fighter out at the end of round four due to damage sustained. During that fourth round, Sefo was down for over four minutes and was seen by ringside physicians after sustaining a low blow before suffering two knockdowns, one from a low kick and the other a barrage of unanswered strikes. Hug then registered back-to-back unanimous decision victories over Stefan Leko, in his third defence of the WKA strap at K-1 Fight Night '99 on June 5, and Maurice Smith, at K-1 Spirits '99 on August 22. Continuing his winning streak into the 1999 K-1 World Grand Prix, he floored Hiromi Amada twice with low kicks then finished him with a spinning heel kick in round one at the K-1 World Grand Prix '99 opening round on October 5. In the quarter-finals of the K-1 Grand Prix '99 final round, which was held on December 5, Hug met Ernesto Hoost for the fourth and last time. As early as the first round, Hug exacerbated a pre-existing groin injury. This handicap was so severe that it forced him to abandon a large part of his arsenal in his kicking game, and he dropped a unanimous decision.

Hug went 4–0 in 2000, the year of his death. He took a majority decision in his rematch with Musashi at K-1 Burning 2000 on March 19 and a unanimous decision against Glaube Feitosa after a back-and-forth war at K-1 The Millennium on April 23. In his Swiss retirement fight (his last fight in Switzerland) as well as his fourth and last WKA title defence, Hug defeated Mirko Cro Cop at K-1 Fight Night 2000 on June 3. Cro Cop put him under pressure with his boxing at numerous times, but Hug stayed active with his kicks and did enough to take the unanimous decision.

In what would prove to be his final match, Hug scored a quick knockout over Nobu Hayashi at K-1 Spirits 2000 on July 7, 2000, sending his Japanese opponent to the canvas twice inside the first round. He was planning a retirement match and a move into acting in the near future at the time of his death.

== Personal life ==
Hug met his wife Ilona (born July 4, 1964) in summer 1987 while she was working as a fitness trainer and model and the couple married in Inwil on August 28, 1993. Their son, Seya, was born at Lucerne's Klinik Saint Anna on November 19, 1994. Around 1996, it became a struggle for Hug to see his family regularly due to his commitments in Japan and he encouraged Ilona to fulfill her desire to study art and design. Ilona and Seya moved to the United States where she attended the Santa Monica College of Design, Art and Architecture for two years before returning to Switzerland upon completion of her studies.

During the late 1990s, Hug was frequently rumored in the Japanese media to be romantically involved with model and actress Norika Fujiwara.

== Death ==
Hug was in Switzerland in early August 2000 when he suffered more than thirty-nine attacks of high fever and heavy nosebleeding. He visited a hospital for medical tests and examination but doctors found no sign of illness. Despite the advice of the doctors and his manager Rene Ernst, Hug travelled to Japan on 14 August to train ahead of his planned participation in the K-1 World Grand Prix 2000 in Fukuoka. On 15 August, his Swiss personal physician found a swollen tumor on the left side of Hug's neck and declared it malignant. He was rushed to the Nippon Medical School hospital in Bunkyō, Tokyo on 19 August after suffering more feverish attacks. The doctors diagnosed leukemia and began chemotherapy immediately. They also warned Hug that due to heart and circulation problems he had suffered for a while, the chemotherapy treatment might in fact adversely affect his condition. The doctors' warnings proved true when, after starting chemotherapy, Hug suffered hemorrhaging of the brain and inflammation of the lungs (pneumonia) combined with extreme fever. His body showed all the signs of acute leukemia: purple spots, digestion pipe bleeding, eyeball bleeding, urinary tract bleeding and genital bleeding.

On the morning of 21 August, Seidokaikan and K-1 founder Kazuyoshi Ishii visited Hug at the hospital and Hug told him that if he should die soon, he would like to die in Japan. Hug was reportedly in good condition on 22 August, watching television, eating without help and speaking to Ilona on the telephone. That day, he also released the following statement:

"Dear Fans,

I think that you will be shocked when you hear in what state of health I am. When the doctor told me about it, it was an enormous shock even for myself. But I want to inform you about my state of health so that I can fight together with you against this illness. This illness is the most severe opponent of all my fights. But I will win. As if I would stand in the ring I will get power from your cheers and beat this strong opponent. Unfortunately I will not be able to fight at the tournament in October. I will fight against this illness in Japan and one day I will appear again with you. Don't lose hope!

Greetings,

Andy Hug" - The message Hug posted to his fans on the internet on 22 August 2000, after learning of his illness.

His condition worsened on 23 August as he had difficulty breathing in the morning and by afternoon had fallen into a coma and was placed on a life support system. While in the coma, his heart stopped three times but the doctors were able to regain his pulse. When his heart stopped a fourth time on 24 August, the doctors decided against reviving him and let him pass away. He was pronounced dead at 4:21 pm on 24 August 2000, two weeks short of his thirty-sixth birthday.

Reporting of Hug's death was broadcast live on Japanese news channels Fuji Television, Japan News Network, NHK World and TV Asahi. Peter Aerts, who was at the Nippon Medical School hospital having treatment on his lower back at the time, broke down crying for over two hours when told of Hug's passing. When interviewed, he dedicated his performance in the forthcoming K-1 World Grand Prix 2000 Final to Hug. An hour-long press conference attended by the five doctors who treated Hug, Kazuyoshi Ishii and Francisco Filho was also held at 8:45 pm that night.

Hug's funeral was held on 27 August at Zenpuku-ji in Moto-Azabu, Tokyo where his body was cremated. Eight hundred guests including Kazuyoshi Ishii, Hajime Kazumi, Akira Masuda, Shokei Matsui, Kenji Midori and Swiss President Adolf Ogi attended while more than twelve thousand mourners gathered outside. K-1 fighters Francisco Filho, Nobuaki Kakuda and Nicholas Pettas were among the pall-bearers. His ashes were deposited in the cemetery of the Hoshuin temple in Kyoto.

== Championships and awards ==
=== Karate ===
- 4 Countries Team Tournament
  - 4 Countries Team Tournament Champion (gold)
- European Kyokushin Championships
  - 3rd European Kyokushin Championships Heavyweight gold medalist (gold)
  - 4th European Kyokushin Championships Heavyweight bronze medalist (bronze)
  - 5th European Kyokushin Championships Heavyweight gold medalist (gold)
  - 6th European Kyokushin Championships Heavyweight silver medalist (silver)
- Ibusz Oyama Cup
  - 1st Ibusz Oyama Cup Middleweight gold medalist (gold)
  - 2nd Ibusz Oyama Cup Heavyweight gold medalist (gold)
- Kyokushin British Open
  - 11th Kyokushin British Open bronze medalist (bronze)
- Kyokushin Dutch Open
  - 5th Kyokushin Dutch Open Middleweight bronze medalist (bronze)
- Kyokushin Swiss Open
  - 1985 Kyokushin Swiss Open gold medalist (gold)
- Kyokushin World Open
  - 4th Kyokushin World Open silver medalist (silver)
- Seidokaikan Karate World Cup
  - 1992 Seidokaikan Karate World Cup gold medalist (gold)
  - 1993 Seidokaikan Karate World Cup silver medalist (silver)
- Sursee Cup
  - 1st Sursee Cup gold medalist (gold)
- Swiss Kyokushin Championships
  - 1982 Swiss Kyokushin Championships Middleweight gold medalist (gold)
  - 1984 Swiss Kyokushin Championships Heavyweight gold medalist (gold)
- Swiss Oyama Cup
  - 1979 Swiss Oyama Cup gold medalist (gold)
  - 1981 Swiss Oyama Cup gold medalist (gold)

=== Kickboxing ===
- Black Belt Magazine
  - 2001 Honorary Award
- K-1
  - K-1 World Grand Prix 1996 Championship
  - K-1 World Grand Prix 1997 runner-up
  - K-1 World Grand Prix 1998 runner-up
- Universal Kickboxing Federation
  - UKF World Super Heavyweight Championship (one time)
  - Two successful title defences
- World Kickboxing Association
  - WKA World Super Heavyweight (+95 kg/209 lb) Muay Thai Championship (one time)
  - Four successful title defences
- World Muay Thai Council
  - WMTC World Super Heavyweight (+95 kg/209 lb) Championship (one time)

== Kickboxing record ==
Kickboxing record
37 wins (22 (T)KOs), 9 losses, 1 draw
Date	Result	Opponent	Event	Location	Method	Round	Time	Record
2000-07-07	Win	(Japan) Nobu Hayashi	K-1 Spirits 2000	Sendai, Japan	KO (left cross)	1	2:05	37–9–1
2000-06-03	Win	(Croatia) Mirko Cro Cop	K-1 Fight Night 2000	Zurich, Switzerland	Decision (unanimous)	5	3:00	36–9–1
Retains the WKA World Super Heavyweight (+95 kg/209 lb) Muay Thai Championship.
2000-04-23	Win	(Brazil) Glaube Feitosa	K-1 The Millennium	Osaka, Japan	Decision (unanimous)	5	3:00	35–9–1
2000-03-19	Win	(Japan) Musashi	K-1 Burning 2000	Yokohama, Japan	Decision (majority)	5	3:00	34–9–1
1999-12-05	Loss	(Netherlands) Ernesto Hoost	K-1 Grand Prix '99 final round, quarter-finals	Tokyo, Japan	Decision (unanimous)	3	3:00	33–9–1
1999-10-05	Win	(Japan) Hiromi Amada	K-1 World Grand Prix '99 opening round, first round	Osaka, Japan	TKO (right spinning heel kick)	1	1:51	33–8–1
1999-09-22	Win	(United States) Maurice Smith	K-1 Spirits '99	Tokyo, Japan	Decision (unanimous)	5	3:00	32–8–1
1999-06-05	Win	(Germany) Stefan Leko	K-1 Fight Night '99	Zurich, Switzerland	Decision (unanimous)	5	3:00	31–8–1
Retains the WKA World Super Heavyweight (+95 kg/209 lb) Muay Thai Championship.
1999-04-25	Win	(New Zealand) Ray Sefo	K-1 Revenge '99	Yokohama, Japan	TKO (corner stoppage)	4	3:00	30–8–1
1999-02-03	Win	(Japan) Tsuyoshi Nakasako	K-1 Rising Sun '99	Tokyo, Japan	KO (right spinning heel kick)	2	0:22	29–8–1
1998-12-13	Loss	(Netherlands) Peter Aerts	K-1 Grand Prix '98 Final Round, Final	Tokyo, Japan	KO (left high kick)	1	1:10	28–8–1
For K-1 Grand Prix '98 Championship.
1998-12-13	Win	(Australia) Sam Greco	K-1 Grand Prix '98 Final Round, semi-finals	Tokyo, Japan	Decision (majority)	3	3:00	28–7–1
1998-12-13	Win	(New Zealand) Ray Sefo	K-1 Grand Prix '98 Final Round, quarter-finals	Tokyo, Japan	TKO (punches)	2	2:28	27–7–1
1998-10-28	Win	(Japan) Masaaki Miyamoto	K-1 Japan '98 Kamikaze	Tokyo, Japan	KO (spinning backfist)	1	2:50	26–7–1
1998-09-27	Win	(England) Mark Russell	K-1 World Grand Prix '98 opening round, first round	Osaka, Japan	KO (left low kick)	2	3:07	25–7–1
1998-08-07	Win	(United States) Mike LaBree	K-1 USA Grand Prix '98	Las Vegas, Nevada, USA	KO (right low kick)	1	2:11	24–7–1
1998-06-06	Win	(Netherlands) Peter Aerts	K-1 Fight Night '98	Zurich, Switzerland	Decision (unanimous)	5	3:00	23–7–1
Retains the WKA World Super Heavyweight (+95 kg/209 lb) Muay Thai Championship.
1998-04-09	Win	(United States) Curtis Schuster	K-1 Kings '98	Yokohama, Japan	Decision (unanimous)	5	3:00	22–7–1
1997-11-09	Loss	(Netherlands) Ernesto Hoost	K-1 Grand Prix '97 Final, Final	Tokyo, Japan	Decision (unanimous)	3	3:00	21–7–1
For the K-1 Grand Prix '97 Championship.
1997-11-09	Win	(Netherlands) Peter Aerts	K-1 Grand Prix '97 Final, semi-finals	Tokyo, Japan	Decision (unanimous)	3	3:00	21–6–1
1997-11-09	Win	(Japan) Masaaki Satake	K-1 Grand Prix '97 Final, quarter-finals	Tokyo, Japan	KO (left high kick)	1	0:15	20–6–1
1997-09-07	Win	(Canada) Pierre Guénette	K-1 Grand Prix '97 1st round, first round	Osaka, Japan	KO (right hook)	1	1:49	19–6–1
1997-07-20	Loss	(Brazil) Francisco Filho	K-1 Dream '97	Nagoya, Japan	KO (right hook)	1	2:37	18–6–1
1997-06-07	Win	(South Africa) Mike Bernardo	K-1 Fight Night '97	Zurich, Switzerland	Decision (unanimous)	5	3:00	18–5–1
Retains the WKA World Super Heavyweight (+95 kg/209 lb) Muay Thai Championship.
1997-04-29	Draw	(Australia) Sam Greco	K-1 Braves '97	Fukuoka, Japan	Draw (split)	5	3:00	17–5–1
1997-03-16	Loss	(Netherlands) Peter Aerts	K-1 Kings '97	Yokohama, Japan	KO (right uppercut and left knee)	1	1:55	17–5
1996-12-08	Win	(Japan) Musashi	K-1 Hercules '96	Nagoya, Japan	Decision (unanimous)	5	3:00	17–4
1996-10-18	Win	(Japan) Masaaki Satake	K-1 Star Wars '96	Yokohama, Japan	Decision (unanimous)	5	3:00	16–4
Wins the WKA World Super Heavyweight (+95 kg/209 lb) Muay Thai Championship.
1996-09-01	Win	(Australia) Stan Longinidis	K-1 Revenge '96	Osaka, Japan	KO (left cross)	2	2:00	15–4
Wins the WMTC World Super Heavyweight (+95 kg/209 lb) Championship.
1996-06-02	Win	(Thailand) Sadau Kiatsongrit	K-1 Fight Night II	Zurich, Switzerland	KO (right hook)	2	3:00	14–4
Retains the UKF World Super Heavyweight Championship.
1996-05-06	Win	(South Africa) Mike Bernardo	K-1 Grand Prix '96, Final	Yokohama, Japan	KO (left spinning heel kick to the leg)	2	1:18	13–4
Wins the K-1 Grand Prix '96 Championship.
1996-05-06	Win	(Netherlands) Ernesto Hoost	K-1 Grand Prix '96, semi-finals	Yokohama, Japan	2nd extension round decision (split)	5	3:00	12–4
1996-05-06	Win	(South Africa) Duane van der Merwe	K-1 Grand Prix '96, quarter-finals	Yokohama, Japan	KO (left hook)	1	0:40	11–4
1996-03-10	Win	(United States) Bart Vale	K-1 Grand Prix '96 Opening Battle, first round	Yokohama, Japan	TKO (punches)	1	2:24	10–4
1995-12-09	Win	(France) Jérôme Le Banner	K-1 Hercules	Nagoya, Japan	Decision (unanimous)	5	3:00	9–4
1995-09-03	Loss	(South Africa) Mike Bernardo	K-1 Revenge II	Yokohama, Japan	KO (right hook)	2	2:43	8–4
1995-07-16	Loss	(Netherlands) Ernesto Hoost	K-3 Grand Prix '95	Nagoya, Japan	Decision (majority)	3	3:00	8–3
1995-06-10	Win	(United States) Dennis Lane	K-1 Fight Night	Zurich, Switzerland	TKO (corner stoppage)	2	3:00	8–2
Retains the UKF World Super Heavyweight Championship.
1995-05-04	Win	(Netherlands) Peter Kramer	K-1 World Grand Prix 1995	Tokyo, Japan	KO (left overhand)	1	0:45	7–2
1995-03-03	Loss	(South Africa) Mike Bernardo	K-1 Grand Prix '95 Opening Battle, first round	Tokyo, Japan	TKO (punches)	3	2:39	6–2
1994-12-10	Win	(Netherlands) Rob van Esdonk	K-1 Legend	Nagoya, Japan	KO (left hook)	4	0:55	6–1
Wins the UKF World Super Heavyweight Championship.
1994-10-02	Win	(United States) Duke Roufus	1994 Seidokaikan Karate World Cup	Japan	KO (left body kick)	3	2:17	5–1
1994-09-18	Win	(United States) Patrick Smith	K-1 Revenge	Yokohama, Japan	KO (left knee)	1	0:56	4–1
1994-04-30	Loss	(United States) Patrick Smith	K-1 Grand Prix '94, quarter-finals	Tokyo, Japan	KO (right uppercut)	1	0:19	3–1
1994-03-04	Win	(Croatia) Branko Cikatić	K-1 Challenge	Tokyo, Japan	Decision (unanimous)	5	3:00	3–0
1993-12-19	Win	(France) Eric Albert	K-2 Grand Prix '93	Tokyo, Japan	KO (punches)	2	2:08	2–0
1993-11-15	Win	(Japan) Ryuji Murakami	K-1 Andy's Glove	Tokyo, Japan	KO (right hook)	1	2:10	1–0
Legend: Win Loss Draw/no contest Notes

== Karate record ==
Kyokushin record
Date	Result	Opponent	Event	Location	Method	Round	Time
1991-11-00	Loss	(Brazil) Francisco Filho	5th Kyokushin World Open, Third Round	Tokyo, Japan	Ippon
1989-07-00	Loss	(England) Michael Thompson	6th European Kyokushin Championships, Final	Budapest, Hungary
Wins the 6th European Kyokushin Championships Heavyweight Silver Medal.
1989-00-00	Win	(England) Michael Thompson	5th European Kyokushin Championships, Final	Budapest, Hungary
Wins the 5th European Kyokushin Championships Heavyweight Gold Medal.
1988-00-00	Win	(Japan) Kenji Midori	1st Sursee Cup, Final	Sursee, Switzerland
Wins the 1st Sursee Cup Gold Medal.
1987-11-08	Loss	(Japan) Shokei Matsui	4th Kyokushin World Open, Final	Tokyo, Japan	Decision
Wins the 4th Kyokushin World Open Silver Medal.
1987-11-08	Win	(Japan) Akira Masuda	4th Kyokushin World Open, Fifth Round	Tokyo, Japan	Decision
1987-11-08	Win	(Brazil) Ademir da Costa	4th Kyokushin World Open, Fourth Round	Tokyo, Japan	Awase ippon
1987-11-08	Win	(Japan) Yasuhiro Kuwashima	4th Kyokushin World Open, Third Round	Tokyo, Japan	Ippon
1987-11-08	Win	(Japan) Masashi Kimoto	4th Kyokushin World Open, Second Round	Tokyo, Japan	Decision
1987-11-00	Win	(Germany) Stefan Gopel	4th Kyokushin World Open, first round	Tokyo, Japan	Ippon
1987-05-00	Loss	(England) Michael Thompson	4th European Kyokushin Championships, semi-finals	Katowice, Poland
1986-00-00	Loss	(England) Michael Thompson	11th Kyokushin British Open, semi-finals	London, England
1985-12-00	Win	(Denmark) Klaus Rex	3rd European Kyokushin Championships, Final	Barcelona, Spain	Decision
Wins the 3rd European Kyokushin Championships Heavyweight Gold Medal.
1985-04-00	Win	(Netherlands) Michel Wedel	2nd Ibusz Oyama Cup, Final	Budapest, Hungary
Wins the 2nd Ibusz Oyama Cup Heavyweight Gold Medal.
1985-00-00	Win	(Denmark) Klaus Rex	1985 Kyokushin Swiss Open, Final	Switzerland
Wins the 1985 Kyokushin Swiss Open Gold Medal.
1984-01-00	Loss	(Japan) Shokei Matsui	3rd Kyokushin World Open, Fifth Round	Tokyo, Japan	Decision
1983-00-00	Loss	(Denmark) Flemming Jinzen	7th Kyokushin Dutch Open, Round of 16	Alkmaar, Netherlands
1983-06-00	Win	(Poland) Mark Niedziokka	1st Ibusz Oyama Cup, Final	Budapest, Hungary
Wins the 1st Ibusz Oyama Cup Middleweight Gold Medal.
1982-00-00	Loss	(Netherlands) Kenneth Felter	6th Kyokushin Dutch Open, Round of 16	Netherlands
1982-00-00	Loss	(France) Jean-Pierre Louisset	2nd European Kyokushin Championships, Round of 16	London, England
1982-00-00	Win	(Switzerland) Gabriel Marxer	1982 Swiss Kyokushin Championships, Final	Switzerland
Wins the 1982 Swiss Kyokushin Championships Middleweight Gold Medal.
1981-00-00	Win	(Switzerland) Heinz Muntweiler	1981 Swiss Oyama Cup, Final	Switzerland
Wins the 1981 Swiss Oyama Cup Gold Medal.
1981-00-00	Loss	(Netherlands) Koen Scharrenberg	5th Kyokushin Dutch Open, semi-finals	Weert, Netherlands

Seidokaikan record
Date	Result	Opponent	Event	Location	Method	Round	Time	Record
1995-10-08	Win	(England) Michael Thompson	1995 Seidokaikan Karate World Cup	Osaka, Japan	Decision (unanimous)	5	3:00	13–1
1994-10-02	Win	(United States) Duke Roufus	1994 Seidokaikan Karate World Cup	Osaka, Japan	KO (kick to the body)	3	2:17	12–1
1993-10-03	Loss	(Japan) Masaaki Satake	K-1 Illusion 1993 Karate World Cup Final	Osaka, Japan	Tameshiwari	5	3:00	11–1
For the 1993 Seidokaikan Karate World Cup Championship. After four overtime rounds, the bout went to sudden death where Hug lost in a Tameshiwari contest.
1993-10-03	Win	(Japan) Toshiyuki Atokawa	K-1 Illusion 1993 Karate World Cup, semi-finals	Osaka, Japan	Decision	1	3:00	11–0
1993-10-02	Win	(Thailand) Changpuek Kiatsongrit	K-1 Illusion 1993 Karate World Cup, quarter-finals	Osaka, Japan	Decision	1	3:00	10–0
1993-10-02	Win	(Japan) Yoshinori Arata	K-1 Illusion 1993 Karate World Cup, first round	Osaka, Japan	KO	1		9–0
1993-06-25	Win	(Japan) Minoru Fujita	K-1 Sanctuary III	Osaka, Japan	Decision	1	3:00	8–0
1993-04-30	Win	(Japan) Nobuaki Kakuda	K-1 Grand Prix '93	Tokyo, Japan	KO (left knee)	2	1:26	7–0
1992-10-04	Win	(Japan) Taiei Kin	1992 Seidokaikan Karate World Cup, Final					6–0
Wins the 1992 Seidokaikan Karate World Cup Championship.
1992-10-03	Win	(Japan) Shuji Suzuki	1992 Seidokaikan Karate World Cup, semi-finals		KO (Awase Ippon)			5–0
1992-10-02	Win	(Japan) Minoru Fujita	1992 Seidokaikan Karate World Cup, quarter-finals		Decision	1	3:00	4–0
1992-10-02	Win	(Japan) Nobuaki Kakuda	1992 Seidokaikan Karate World Cup, Second Round		Ippon			3–0
1992-10-02	Win	(Japan) Gozen Morita	1992 Seidokaikan Karate World Cup, first round		Ippon			2–0
1992-07-30	Win	(Japan) Toshiyuki Yanagisawa	Seidokaikan Kakutogi Olympic II	Tokyo, Japan	Decision	5	3:00	1–0

Legend: Win Loss Draw/no contest Notes
