= K-1 Grand Prix '96 =

K-1 martial arts event in 1996

- Promotion: K-1
- Date: May 6, 1996
- Venue: Yokohama Arena
- City: Yokohama, Japan
- Attendance: 17,850

Event chronology
| K-1 Grand Prix '96 Opening Battle | K-1 Grand Prix '96 | K-1 Fight Night II |

K-1 Grand Prix '96 was a kickboxing event promoted by the K-1 organization. It was the fourth K-1 World Grand Prix final involving eight of the world's best heavyweight fighters (+95 kg/209 lbs), with all bouts fought under K-1 Rules. The eight finalists had all almost qualified via elimination fights at the K-1 Grand Prix '96 Opening Battle event. The only absentee was Stan Longinidis who was unable to participate in the tournament due to injury - he was replaced by reservist Duane Van Der Merwe. As well as tournament bouts there were also two 'Super Fights' fought under K-1 Rules. In total there were twelve fighters at the event, representing seven countries.

The tournament winner was Andy Hug who defeated Mike Bernardo in the final by way of second round knockout. This would be the popular Hug's first and sole K-1 World Grand Prix title, although he would be the runner up in two more finals. Mike Bernardo would be taking place in his first and only K-1 final, causing a considerable upset by defeating defending champion Peter Aerts by knockout in the quarter-finals. The event was held at the Yokohama Arena in Yokohama, Japan on Monday, May 6, 1996 in front of 17,850 spectators.

== K-1 Grand Prix '96 Tournament ==
K-1 Grand Prix '96 Opening Battle
(Netherlands) Peter Aerts | KO
(United States) Jean-Claude Leuyer
(South Africa) Mike Bernardo | TKO
(United States) Jeff Roufus
(Australia) Sam Greco | DEC
(Suriname) Perry Telgt
(United States) Kit Lykins
(Japan) Musashi | KO
(Croatia) Mirko Cro Cop | DEC
(France) Jérôme Le Banner
(England) Stuart Green
(Netherlands) Ernesto Hoost | KO
(Switzerland) Andy Hug | TKO
(United States) Bart Vale
(Thailand) Sadau Kiatsongrit
(Australia) Stan Longinidis | DEC

Quarter-finals
(Netherlands) Peter Aerts
(South Africa) Mike Bernardo | KO
(Australia) Sam Greco
(Japan) Musashi | TKO
(Croatia) Mirko Cro Cop
(Netherlands) Ernesto Hoost | KO
(Switzerland) Andy Hug | KO
(South Africa) Duane Van Der Merwe *

Semi-finals
(South Africa) Mike Bernardo | DEC
(Japan) Musashi
(Netherlands) Ernesto Hoost
(Switzerland) Andy Hug | DEC

Final
(South Africa) Mike Bernardo
(Switzerland) Andy Hug | KO

* Reserve Fight winner Duane Van Der Merwe replaced Stan Longinidis in the quarter-finals as Stan Longinidis was injured

== Results ==
K-1 Grand Prix '96 Results
K-1 Grand Prix Quarter-finals: K-1 Rules / 3Min. 3R Ext.1R
(South Africa) Mike Bernardo def. Peter Aerts (Netherlands)
Bernardo defeated Aerts by KO (Left Hook) at 0:13 of the 3rd round.
(Japan) Musashi def. Sam Greco (Australia)
Musashi defeated Greco by TKO (Doctor Stoppage, Broken Toe) at 3:00 of the 1st round.
(Netherlands) Ernesto Hoost def. Mirko Cro Cop (Croatia)
Hoost defeated Cro Cop by KO (Right Low Kick) at 1:27 of the 3rd round.
(Switzerland) Andy Hug def. Duane Van Der Merwe (South Africa)
Hug defeated Van Der Merwe by KO (Left Hook) at 0:40 of the 1st round.
Super Fight 1: K-1 Rules / 3Min. 3R
(Japan) Masaaki Miyamoto def. Ron Smoorenburg (Netherlands)
Miyamoto defeated Smoorenburg by KO (Right Punch) at 0:13 of the 1st round.
K-1 Grand Prix Semi-finals: K-1 Rules / 3Min. 3R Ext.2R
(South Africa) Mike Bernardo def. Musashi (Japan)
Bernardo defeated Musashi by 3rd round Unanimous Decision 3-0 (30-28, 29-28, 30-28).
(Switzerland) Andy Hug def. Ernesto Hoost (Netherlands)
Hug defeated Hoost by 2nd Extra Round Split Decision 2-1 (10-9, 9-10, 10-9). After the 1st Extra Round the judges scored it a Majority Draw 1-0 (10-10, 10-9, 10-10) in favour of Hoost, while after the first 3 rounds the judges had scored it a Decision Draw 1-1 (30-29 Hug, 30-30, 29-30 Hoost).
Super Fight 2: K-1 Rules / 3Min. 3R
(Netherlands) Rene Rooze def. Jean-Claude Leuyer (United States)
Rooze defeated Leuyer by KO (Punches) at 1:50 of the 1st round.
K-1 Grand Prix Final: K-1 Rules / 3Min. 3R Ext.2R
(Switzerland) Andy Hug def. Mike Bernardo (South Africa)
Hug defeated Bernardo by KO (Left Spinning Low Kick) at 1:18 of the 2nd round.

== See also ==
- List of K-1 events
- List of male kickboxers
