= Shootfighting =

Type of competitive martial art

- シュートファイティング
- ISFA Logo
- Focus: Hybrid (Combat Sport & Street Combat)
- Country of origin: Japan (in general) and United States (ISFA only)
- Famous practitioners: Alexander Gustafsson (UFC); Evan Tanner (UFC); Frank Shamrock (Strikeforce); Jake Shields (PFL); Kazushi Sakuraba (PRIDE); Ken Shamrock (Pancrase); Kyoji Horiguchi (Rizin FF); Takanori Gomi (Shooto); Jason DeLucia (Pancrase); Jerry Bohlander (UFC)
- Parenthood: Shoot wrestling, Catch wrestling, American Kenpo, Judo, Boxing, Kickboxing, Karate, Muay Thai, Jujutsu, Brazilian Jiu Jitsu
- Olympic sport: No

Shootfighting is a martial art and combat sport, with competitions governed by the International Shootfighting Association (ISFA). It incorporates techniques from a multitude of traditional martial arts, the most principal of these being wrestling and kenpo.

Shootfighting was previously used synonymously with mixed martial arts competitions in the Japanese shoot wrestling scene, as opposed to shoot-style professional wrestling competitions, and was also used in professional wrestling to refer to genuine fights between wrestlers rather than predetermined match outcomes. The term has been retired from common usage because it became a registered trademark of Bart Vale, who uses it to describe his hybrid fighting system derived from shoot wrestling. However, it is still sometimes used colloquially.

Examples which were once considered shootfighting styles, tournaments or organizations are Pancrase, Fighting Network RINGS, and Shooto, where many fighters still considered themselves to be shootfighters. Ken Shamrock is possibly the most recognisable shoot fighter, as it was the discipline he was billed representing during the early days of the UFC. Additionally, Shootfighting had a following in Sweden and Scandinavia during the 1990s and 2000s, in part because its regulated ruleset provided a means of competing in mixed striking and grappling at a time when Swedish legislation restricted certain combat sport competitions.

== History ==
Shootfighting's use as a synonym for mixed martial arts had its genesis in the 1970s, when Karl Gotch taught a group of Japanese professional wrestlers catch wrestling techniques, called "hooking" or "shooting". In 1976, one of these pro-wrestlers, Antonio Inoki, hosted a series of matches against practitioners of other martial arts; most of these were "worked" (predetermined), but one particular high-profile one was against Muhammad Ali, which was in fact a shoot. This led to an increased interest in real and effective technique, and eventually led to the creation of shoot wrestling, with some shoot-style professional wrestling organizations hosting legitimate mixed martial arts bouts, called "shoots". Interest grew in the 1990s, and certain shoot-style organizations like Shooto, Pancrase and RINGS evolved into pure "shoot" organizations. The term "shootfighting" was frequently used to describe these events and styles.

Bart Vale, an American with a background in professional wrestling, champion of the Japanese Pro Wrestling Fujiwara Gumi (PWFG, a Japanese shoot-style professional wrestling organization) for close to three years, moved back to America opening the "Tiger & Dragon Kenpo Karate Academy" and used the term "shootfighting", to describe his own hybrid fighting system, which was a combination of the shoot wrestling techniques he had learned in Japan and his experience in kenpo, jujutsu and Muay Thai. He also founded the International Shootfighting Association (ISFA) to promote shootfighting as a combat sport. By 1992, Shootfighting events involving Vale's students were being held in Miami as part of a PWFG show, and Vale promoted the "Shootfighting World Championships". He also would trademark the term, reserving the rights to use it for himself and his organization. Vale also received American media exposure before the UFC's first event, including a feature on MTV and later profiles in Sports Illustrated.

Ken Shamrock, at the time Pancrase champion and former Fujiwara Gumi alumni, entered in UFC 1 representing "Shootfighting", describing his fighting style at Pancrase. With Shamrock's success in the early UFC, Bart Vale would use a worked (i.e. scripted) victory at Fujiwara Gumi against Shamrock, claiming it was a real fight to promote himself in the United States as a MMA legend in Japan. His actual MMA record is 1-2-0.

In Sweden, “shootfighting” also developed as a distinct combat sport ruleset during the 1990s. In 1995, Swedish martial artists August Wallén and Omar Bouiche traveled to the United States to learn Shootfighting; Wallén trained with Bart Vale in Miami and subsequently brought the style back to Sweden, while Bouiche also helped introduce it in Stockholm. Bouiche would also be connected to the Japanese shoot-style scene. He became the first Swedish fighter to compete in Pancrase from 1997 to 2001, with notable wins over Minoru Suzuki and Jason DeLucia. Wallén registered the name "Shootfighting" in Sweden in 1995, and the Swedish Shootfighting Federation subsequently administered the sport. The rules combined stand-up striking, takedowns and submission grappling, while restricting strikes against grounded opponents. The ruleset provided a regulated form of mixed striking and grappling during a period when Swedish legislation placed restrictions on combat sport competitions. Swedish fighters including Alexander Gustafsson, Mats Nilsson, Magnus Cedenblad, Lina Länsberg and Pannie Kianzad competed in shootfighting before transitioning to professional MMA. In 2012, administration of the sport was transferred to the Swedish MMA Federation, which subsequently incorporated Shootfighting as a lower-level ruleset alongside amateur and professional MMA.

== Rules ==
Shootfighting is a hybrid martial art, with similar but more limited rules compared to mixed martial arts.

Currently professional shootfighting matches consists only of a heavyweight (200 lb or more) division. But there are lighter divisions for amateur competitors. Pro matches run 30 minutes non-stop, amateurs 10 minutes. Held inside a standard wrestling ring, competitors are allowed to kick, knee or elbow any part of the body except the groin, as well as headbutt. Punches are allowed to the body. Since no gloves are worn to facilitate wrestling, punches aren't allowed to the head, although open hand palms and slaps are allowed. Any type of throw or takedown is legal and competitors are allowed to hit a downed opponent. Additionally, any type of joint lock is legal as are chokes against the side of the neck. The only foul consists of punches to the face, eye-gouges, techniques against the windpipe and groin strikes.

Fights are won when a competitor is knocked down for a 10 count, knocked down 5 times or forced to submit. A fighter caught in a submission hold may grab the ropes to break the hold, but this counts as a 1/3 of a knock down. Grabbing the ropes 15 times equals a loss. Bouts that go to the full time limit are declared a draw.

== See also ==
- Aliveness (martial arts)
- Pancrase
- Pride Fighting Championships
- Fighting Network RINGS
- Puroresu
- Shooto
- Ultimate Fighting Championship
- Vale tudo
