= K-1 Grand Prix '98 final round =

K-1 martial arts event in 1998

- Promotion: K-1
- Date: December 13, 1998
- Venue: Tokyo Dome
- City: Tokyo, Japan
- Attendance: 63,800

Event chronology
K-1 Japan '98 Kamikaze	K-1 Grand Prix '98 final round	K-1 Rising Sun '99

K-1 Grand Prix '98 final round was a martial arts event promoted by the K-1. The event was held at the Tokyo Dome in Tokyo, Japan, on Sunday, December 13, 1998, in front of 63,800 spectators. It was the sixth K-1 World Grand Prix final involving eight of the world's best heavyweight fighters (+95 kg/209 lbs), with all bouts fought under K-1 rules. The eight finalists had all qualified via elimination fights at the K-1 World Grand Prix '98 opening round. Also on the card was a number of 'Freshman Fights' fought under a mixture of Jiu-Jitsu Freestyle and K-1 rules (various weight classes). In total there were eighteen fighters at the event, representing seven countries.

The tournament winner was Peter Aerts who won his third K-1 Grand Prix final by defeated Andy Hug by way of first round knockout. Andy would be making his third consecutive final appearance, having won it in 1996 and been runner up the following year.

== K-1 Grand Prix '98 final round tournament ==
K-1 World Grand Prix '98 opening round
(South Africa) Mike Bernardo	DEC
(United States) Maurice Smith
(Brazil) Francisco Filho	KO
(United States) Rick Roufus
(Netherlands) Peter Aerts	TKO
(Croatia) Sinisa Andrijasevic
(Brazil) Glaube Feitosa
(Japan) Masaaki Satake	DEC
(Netherlands) Ernesto Hoost	TKO
(Greece) Tasis Petridis
(Australia) Sam Greco	DEC
(England) Matt Skelton
(Switzerland) Andy Hug	KO
(England) Mark Russell
(Germany) Stefan Leko
(New Zealand) Ray Sefo	DEC

Quarter-finals
(South Africa) Mike Bernardo	KO
(Brazil) Francisco Filho
(Netherlands) Peter Aerts	TKO
(Japan) Masaaki Satake
(Netherlands) Ernesto Hoost
(Australia) Sam Greco	TKO
(Switzerland) Andy Hug	TKO
(New Zealand) Ray Sefo

Semi-finals
(South Africa) Mike Bernardo
(Netherlands) Peter Aerts	TKO
(Australia) Sam Greco
(Switzerland) Andy Hug	DEC

Final
(Netherlands) Peter Aerts	KO
(Switzerland) Andy Hug

== Results ==
K-1 Grand Prix '98 final round results
Freshman fights 1 + 2: jiu-jitsu freestyle rules / 8Min. 1R
(Japan) Kazuhiro Inoue def. Toru Hirai (Japan)
Inoue defeated Hirai by Submission (Armbar) at 5:30.
(Japan) Yasuki Hiramatsu def. Takayuki Okada (Japan)
Hiramatsu defeated Okada by TKO (Doctor Stoppage) at 0:52.
Freshman fight 3 (-72.5 kg): K-1 rules / 3Min. 3R
(Japan) Takashi Ohno def. Akira Okada (Japan)
Ohno defeated Okada by 3rd Round Unanimous Decision 3-0 (30-27, 30-26, 30-26).
Freshman fight 4 (Open Weight): K-1 rules / 3Min. 3R
(Japan) Masahi Suzuki def. Ryo Kataoka (Japan)
Suzuki defeated Kataoka by KO at 1:32 of the 2nd Round.
Freshman fight 5 (-58 kg): K-1 rules / 3Min. 5R
(Japan) Hideki Takada def. Susumu Daiguji (Japan)
Takada defeated Daiguji by 5th Round Majority Decision 2-0 (49-49, 49-47, 49-47).
K-1 Grand Prix quarter-finals: K-1 rules / 3Min. 3R Ext.1R
(South Africa) Mike Bernardo def. Francisco Filho (Brazil)
Bernardo defeated Filho by KO (Right Overhand) at 1:35 of the 3rd Round.
(Netherlands) Peter Aerts def. Masaaki Satake (Japan)
Aerts defeated Satake by TKO (Referee Stoppage, Left Knee Strike) at 2:40 of the 1st Round.
(Australia) Sam Greco def. Ernesto Hoost (Netherlands)
Greco defeated Hoost by TKO (Corner Stoppage, Cut) at 3:00 of the 2nd Round.
(Switzerland) Andy Hug def. Ray Sefo (New Zealand)
Hug defeated Sefo by TKO (Referee Stoppage, 2 Knockdowns) at 2:28 of the 2nd Round.
K-1 Grand Prix Semi Finals: K-1 rules / 3Min. 3R Ext.1R
(Netherlands) Peter Aerts def. Mike Bernardo (South Africa)
Aerts defeated Bernardo by TKO (Referee Stoppage, 2 Knockdowns) at 2:53 of the 1st Round.
(Switzerland) Andy Hug def. Sam Greco (Australia)
Hug defeated Greco by 3rd Round Majority Decision 2-0 (30-29, 30-30, 30-29).
K-1 Grand Prix Final: K-1 rules / 3Min. 3R Ext.2R
(Netherlands) Peter Aerts def. Andy Hug (Switzerland)
Aerts defeated Hug by KO (Left High Kick) at 1:10 of the 1st Round.

== See also ==
- List of K-1 events
- List of male kickboxers
