= Bart Vale =

American professional wrestler, kickboxer and mixed martial arts fighter

- Born: May 4, 1957 (age 69); Miami, Florida, United States
- Height: 6 ft 2 in (1.88 m)
- Weight: 250 lb (110 kg; 18 st)
- Division: Heavyweight
- Style: Shootfighting, Kara-Ho Kempo, Wrestling, Kickboxing
- Fighting out of: Miami, Florida, United States
- Team: Tigers & Dragon Karate Gym
- Rank: 10th Dan Black Belt in Kempo Karate
- Years active: 1993–2000

Kickboxing record
- Total: 2
- Wins: 0
- Losses: 2
- By knockout: 2
- Draws: 0

Mixed martial arts record
- Total: 3
- Wins: 1
- By submission: 1
- Losses: 2
- By knockout: 2

Other information
- Mixed martial arts record from Sherdog

YouTube information
- Channel: Bart Vale
- Years active: 2014-2021
- Genre: Podcasting
- Subscribers: 3.34 thousand
- Views: 1.7 million
- Last updated: 8 September 2026

Bart Vale (born May 4, 1957) is an American former kickboxer, mixed martial artist and professional wrestler. He is known for his "old school" American martial arts look, consisting of a mustache, mullet and American flag trunks.

Vale began his martial arts training in kenpo in 1970 and later traveled to Japan, where he competed in shoot-style professional wrestling. During his time in Japan, he studied several other martial arts and combined them with shoot wrestling to develop his own hybrid fighting system, which he called "shootfighting". He subsequently co-founded the International Shootfighting Association and promoted shootfighting events in the United States. Vale competed in early Mixed martial arts (MMA) competition and in K-1 Kickboxing.

In 2006, Black Belt magazine named him its Full-Contact Fighter of the Year and part of its Hall of Fame.

== Career ==
Bart Vale began his martial arts training in 1970 with kenpo. He later traveled to Japan, where he trained under Joe Malenko and became a professional wrestler in the Newborn UWF, an organization which promoted pro wrestling matches with realistic grappling and striking, which is known as shoot-style. After the organization closed in 1990 he moved to Yoshiaki Fujiwara's Pro Wrestling Fujiwara Gumi (PWFG) organization in 1991, where after defeating Fukiawara in 1992 he became the champion for close to three years.

In Japan, he also studied a number of other styles and used his training in martial arts, including kenpo, kickboxing, jujutsu and Muay Thai, and shoot wrestling to create a hybrid martial art that combined striking and grappling, naming it "shootfighting", a term frequently used in Japan to describe legitimate shoot-style wrestling fighting. Back on the United States, he founded the "Tigers & Dragon Karate Gym" to teach his martial arts, including shootfighting. He co-founded the International Shootfighting Association and, by 1992, Shootfighting events involving Vale's students were being held in Miami as part of a Pro Wrestling Fujiwara Gumi show, and Vale promoted the "Shootfighting World Championships".

Vale also received American media exposure before the UFC's first event, including a feature on MTV and later profiles in Sports Illustrated.

Vale began participating in events for Fighting Network Rings (a shoot-style professional wrestling organization by then) in March 1993. He appeared in five matches for Rings, four of which took place during the organization's pro wrestling period. Rings began promoting mixed martial arts bouts rather than shoot-style works in 1995.

Back in the United States, Vale started competing in early MMA, at the time called NHB, representing shootfighting. In events, he was introduced as "the man who beat Ken Shamrock", in reference to a pro wrestling bout that occurred in Pro Wrestling Fujiwara Gumi on May 15, 1992. In October 1995, Vale competed in the World Combat Championships. In the first round of the tournament he defeated Mike Bitonio via first-round submission. Fighting at 260 lbs, Vale outweighed Bitonio by 45 lbs. Vale was to face Renzo Gracie in the semifinals, but wasn't able to continue due to head lacerations. He had two further MMA bouts, in which he lost to Kazunari Murakami and Dan Severn. He also competed in the K-1 kickboxing promotion twice. In 1996, he was invited into the 1996 K-1 World Grand Prix and was defeated by Andy Hug. His next bout, against Nobuaki Kakuda in 1998, also ended in defeat.

In 2006, Black Belt magazine named Vale its "Full-Contact Fighter of the Year", being inducted to its Hall of Fame and recognized as an MMA pioneer.

== Controversy ==
Vale's reputation has been controversial because of the way he presented his career in Japanese shoot-style professional wrestling as part of his legitimate fighting résumé. Vale promoted himself as the "first Shootfighting World Champion" after defeating Yoshiaki Fujiwara in March 1992, although the bout took place under the rules of Pro Wrestling Fujiwara Gumi (PWFG), where matches were generally worked (i.e. scripted) despite incorporating legitimate fighting techniques. In particular, his May 15, 1992 PWFG match against Ken Shamrock was promoted in later years as a legitimate victory over Shamrock, despite being a worked bout. The controversy was amplified after Shamrock became a prominent fighter in Pancrase and the UFC. Vale continued to cite the victory over Shamrock in promoting his credentials, reportedly leading to Shamrock threatening legal action and challenging Vale to face him in a legitimate MMA bout. Vale never accepted the challenge. In a 2014 interview, Shamrock pointed to the difference between his PWFG appearances and his later fights in Pancrase, where he said the competition was legitimate.

Vale's documented career in legitimate combat sports was relatively limited. He made his professional MMA debut in 1995, defeating Mike Bitonio by submission at the World Combat Championship's inaugural event. He later lost to Kazunari Murakami in 1996 and Dan Severn in 2000, finishing his MMA career with a 1-2-0 record. Vale also competed in kickboxing, fighting twice in K-1, losing to Andy Hug in 1996 and Nobuaki Kakuda in 1998, with a record of 0-2.

== Kickboxing record ==
Kickboxing record
0 wins, 2 losses
Date	Result	Opponent	Event	Location	Method	Round	Time	Record	Notes
October 28, 1998	Loss	(Japan) Nobuaki Kakuda	K-1 Japan '98 Kamikaze	Tokyo, Japan	TKO (doctor stoppage)	1	2:09	0-2	
March 10, 1996	Loss	(Switzerland) Andy Hug	K-1 Grand Prix '96 Opening Battle	Yokohama, Japan	TKO (3 knockdowns)	1	2:24	0-1	
Legend: Win Loss Draw/No contest

== Mixed martial arts record ==
Professional record breakdown
3 matches	1 win	2 losses
By knockout	0	2
By submission	1	0

Res.	Record	Opponent	Method	Event	Date	Round	Time	Location	Notes
Loss	1–2	Dan Severn	TKO (doctor stoppage)	CFA 1: Collision at the Crossroads	March 25, 2000	2	0:36	Corinth, Mississippi, United States	
Loss	1–1	Kazunari Murakami	TKO (punches)	Extreme Fighting 3	October 18, 1996	1	4:37	Tulsa, Oklahoma, United States	
Win	1–0	Mike Bitonio	Submission (arm-triangle choke)	World Combat Championship 1: First Strike	October 17, 1995	1	7:10	Charlotte, North Carolina, United States	

== See also ==
- Shootfighting
- Shoot wrestling
- Mixed martial arts
