= Nobuaki Kakuda =

Japanese karateka

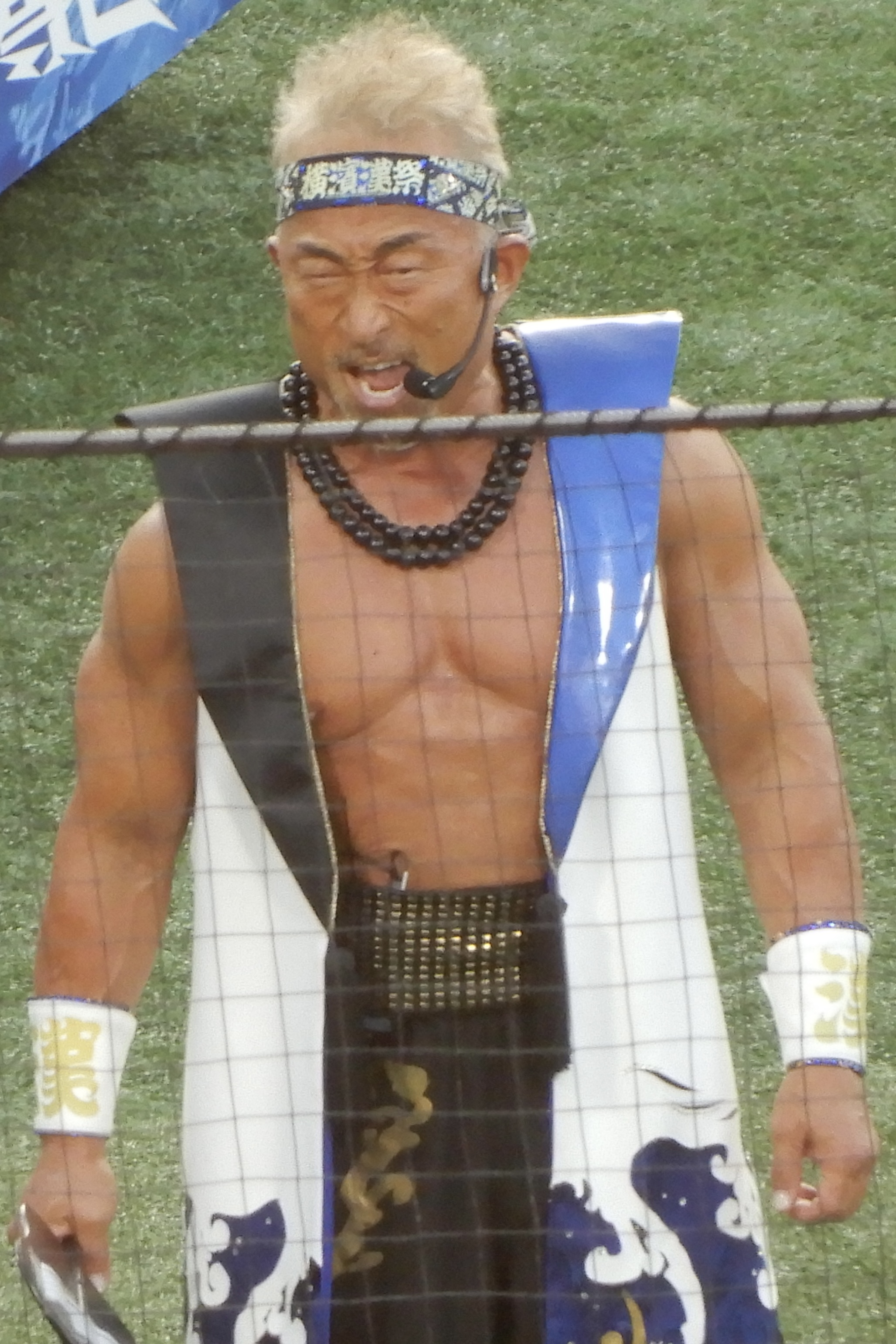
- Kakuda in 2025
- Born: April 11, 1961 (age 65); Sakai, Osaka, Japan
- Native name: 角田信朗
- Other names: The Bushido Bulldozer
- Nationality: (Japan) Japanese
- Height: 1.74 m (5 ft 9 in)
- Weight: 208 lb (94 kg; 14.9 st)
- Division: Heavyweight
- Style: Shoot Wrestling, Kyokushin Karate, Kickboxing, Shorinji Kempo
- Rank: 6th Dan Black Belt in Kyokushin Karate; 2nd Dan Black Belt in Shorinji Kempo
- Years active: 1982–2005

Kickboxing record
- Total: 17
- Wins: 11
- By knockout: 5
- Losses: 5
- By knockout: 1
- Draws: 1

Other information
- Occupation: Karateka, kickboxer, actor, referee

Nobuaki Kakuda (角田信朗, Kakuda Nobuaki; born April 11, 1961) is a Japanese karateka, bodybuilder, and actor. He is also a former kickboxer and K-1 head referee.

== Early life ==
After attending university, Kakuda opened a karate dojo in Kobe but was forced to shut it down after two years. He subsequently worked as a dishwasher, ramen chef, and construction worker. At age 28, he was employed as a bouncer at a public bath in Nara, where he dodged knives thrown at him by local Yakuza after denying them entry.

== Career ==
=== Karate ===
Competitive karate made up the longest portion of Kakuda's martial arts career, beginning relatively early in his life as captain of his university's karate club. Less than a decade later, he was representing Japan in international competition, fighting under kyokushin and eventually seidokaikan rules. He retired following a loss to Michael Thompson at the Seidokaikan Karate World Cup in 1993, but revisited the sport occasionally in later years. His most recent karate fight to date was a decision loss to Hiroki Kurosawa at Pride 6.

=== RINGS ===
From December 1991 to July 1993, Kakuda performed in RINGS, an organization which promoted professional wrestling and mixed martial arts. Though his tenure was prior to the federation's official move to no-holds-barred competition, he competed in several shoot fights, including against shootboxer Mitsuya Nagai in a decision loss and kickboxing legend Rob Kaman, under mixed rules. He lost the fight when, in the third round, Kaman smashed his knee into his downed opponent's face and a technical knockout was ruled.

=== Kickboxing ===
Kakuda's kickboxing tenure began with a victory over fellow newcomer Joe Son at the K-3 Grand Prix '95. After being knocked down early in the fight, Kakuda pummeled Son with unanswered punches and kicks to score a knockout win. His triumph was followed by a more sobering encounter with multi-time world champion Stan Longinidis, who controlled the match with powerful combinations before defeating Kakuda with low kicks.

Kakuda rebounded with several consecutive wins, including a dominant victory over wing chun practitioner Joe Sayah. The streak led to a shot at the vacant WMTC Cruiserweight World Championship at K-1 Braves '97 against legendary Muay Thai fighter Changpuek Kiatsongrit. Kakuda's defensive strategy served him poorly against Kiatsongrit, who won by unanimous decision after controlling all five rounds.

Faring better in his following six matches, Kakuda endured no worse than a draw to mixed martial artist Ryūshi Yanagisawa and gained his only victory over a world champion by defeating Duncan Airlie James. However, after eight years as an active kickboxer, Kakuda sought retirement to focus on his other duties within K-1. What was to be his final match took place at the K-1 World Grand Prix 2003 in Las Vegas against fellow seidokaikan stylist Musashi. Kakuda endured four knockdowns in the final two rounds and lost via unanimous decision.

Kakuda returned from retirement to take part in the first kickboxing tournament of his career - the K-1 World Grand Prix 2005 in Seoul. His first opponent in 19 months was ex-sumo wrestler Akebono Tarō. Despite being the match favorite due to Tarō's 0-5 kickboxing record, Kakuda found himself in trouble when the former yokozuna made use of his tremendous size advantage by swarming his opponent, wearing him down with knees and uppercuts. Kakuda was left with little opportunity (or room) to strike back and lost by unanimous decision.

Kakuda redeemed himself of the loss later that year with his most dominant win yet over mixed martial artist Mavrick Harvey. Within the first minute of fighting, Kakuda scored a one-hit knockout when he struck his opponent in the face, shattering Harvey's cheekbone. Kakuda's next match would mark his second retirement from kickboxing, taking place at the K-1 World Grand Prix 2005 in Osaka – Final Elimination. His final opponent was K-1 newcomer George Longinidis, who defeated Kakuda via unanimous decision in a hard-fought battle.

At the time of his second retirement in 2005, Kakuda was the oldest (44) and shortest (174 cm) participant in the K-1 tournaments. His association with K-1 continues as a regent, ringside judge, and referee – positions he'd already held during his fighting career. He has also served as an executive producer for K-1 under the Fighting and Entertainment Group.

=== Bodybuilding ===
On September 26, 2015, Kakuda entered the world of competitive bodybuilding by participating in the Japan-Guam Goodwill Bodybuilding Championship, where he placed third in the master class. The following summer, he earned second place at the Bodybuilding Fitness Championship Tournament in Osaka. The victory allowed him to advance to the 28th Japan Masters Championship Competition, where he earned second place.

== Personal life ==
Kakuda has two children; he named his son Kenshiro (賢士朗) and daughter Yuria (友里亜) after characters of Fist of the North Star. He is a licensed high school instructor and speaks Japanese, English, French, Thai, and Korean. He is also superstitious, believing in ghosts and spirits and possessing a variety of charms, including a stone from the emperor's grave.

Kakuda repeatedly set Guinness world records for breaking the most wooden baseball bats with his shin in one minute: 27 bats in 2001, 33 in 2002, and 54 in 2009. His record was eventually beaten by German martial artist Kerim Duygu, who managed to break 65 bats in 2017.

== Fighting style ==
Kakuda is primarily a defensive fighter, his style and technique having been molded by his career in karate. Able to absorb a lot of punishment, his plan of action has been to wait for an opening before attacking with high precision. This approach has especially advantaged him over inexperienced fighters who mistake his defensiveness for weakness and consequently fail to anticipate a counterattack. His punching power is considerable, as demonstrated by his single-strike victory over Mavrick Harvey.

Kakuda's technique isn't upset by an opponent's size alone, as he's repeatedly defeated fighters much taller and heavier than he. (An exception being the extraordinarily large Akebono.) Rather, the fighters who have defeated him tend to be both experienced and aggressive, wearing down his defenses while absorbing or negating his comeback strikes. Given his particular skill level, Kakuda often played the role of K-1's gatekeeper by testing the organization's new or junior fighters.

== Titles ==
=== Karate ===
- 1988 Satojyuku POINT & KO Japan Open Tournament - Runner-up
- 1999 Satojyuku POINT & KO Japan Open Tournament - Runner-up
- 7th Kyokushin Karate Tournament - 4th place (Heavyweight division)

=== Kickboxing ===
- K-1 World Grand Prix 2005 in Seoul - Quarterfinalist

=== Bodybuilding ===
- 2015 Japan-Guam Goodwill Bodybuilding Championships - 3rd place
- 2016 Osaka Bodybuilding Fitness Championship Tournament - 2nd place
- 28th Japan Masters Championship - 2nd place

== Kickboxing record ==
11 Wins (5 KOs), 5 Losses (1 KO), 1 Draw
Date	Result	Opponent	Event	Method	Round	Time	Location	Notes
September 23, 2005	Loss	(Australia) George Longinidis	K-1 World Grand Prix 2005 in Osaka – Final Elimination	Decision (Unanimous)	3	3:00	Osaka, Japan	
May 27, 2005	Win	(Germany) Mavrick Harvey	K-1 World Grand Prix 2005 in Paris	KO (Punch)	1	0:56	Paris, France	
March 19, 2005	Loss	(Japan) Akebono	K-1 World Grand Prix 2005 in Seoul	Decision (Unanimous)	3	3:00	Seoul, South Korea	K-1 WGP 2005 in Seoul opening round
August 15, 2003	Loss	(Japan) Musashi	K-1 World Grand Prix 2003 in Las Vegas	Decision (Unanimous)	3	3:00	Las Vegas, United States	
August 19, 2001	Win	(Brazil) Baboo Da Silva	K-1 Andy Memorial 2001 Japan GP Final	Decision (Unanimous)	3	3:00	Saitama, Japan	
January 30, 2001	Draw	(Japan) Ryushi Yanagisawa	K-1 Rising 2001	Draw	3	3:00	Matsuyama, Japan	
March 19, 2000	Win	(Japan) Hiroki Kurosawa	K-1 Burning 2000	TKO (Right Hook, 3 Knockdowns)	1	1:53	Yokohama, Japan	
June 6, 1999	Win	(Scotland) Duncan Airlie James	K-1 Survival '99	Decision (Unanimous)	5	3:00	Sapporo, Japan	
October 28, 1998	Win	(United States) Bart Vale	K-1 Japan '98 Kamikaze	TKO (Doctor Stoppage)	1	2:09	Tokyo, Japan	
July 20, 1997	Win	(Japan) Ryuji Murakami	K-1 Dream '97	Decision (Unanimous)	5	3:00	Nagoya, Japan	
April 29, 1997	Loss	(Thailand) Changpuek Kiatsongrit	K-1 Braves '97	Decision (Unanimous)	5	3:00	Fukuoka, Japan	
Fight was for vacant WMTC Cruiserweight World Title.
December 8, 1996	Win	(Japan) Tsutomu Ueda	K-1 Hercules '96	KO (Right Hook)	1	1:50	Nagoya, Japan	
September 1, 1996	Win	(United States) Zane Frazier	K-1 Revenge '96	Decision (Unanimous)	5	3:00	Osaka, Japan	
December 9, 1995	Win	(Australia) Joe Sayah (Bruce "Dragon" Joe)	K-1 Hercules	KO (Punch)	1	1:25	Nagoya, Japan	
October 8, 1995	Win	(Japan) Nobuhiro Kikuchi		KO	1		-	
September 3, 1995	Loss	(Australia) Stan Longinidis	K-1 Revenge II	KO (Low Kick)	2	3:05	Yokohama, Japan	
July 16, 1995	Win	(United States) Joe Son	K-3 Grand Prix '95	KO (Punch)	1	1:40	Nagoya, Japan	

== Karate record (incomplete) ==
Date	Result	Opponent	Event	Method	Round	Time	Location	Notes
July 4, 1999	Loss	(Japan) Hiroki Kurosawa	Pride 6	Decision			Yokohama, Japan	Kyokushin rules
October 8, 1995	Win	(Japan) Nobuhiro Kikuchi	Karate World Cup '95	KO (Left High Kick)	1	2:15		Seidokaikan rules
October 3, 1993	Loss	(England) Michael Thompson	1993 Seidokaikan Karate World Cup - First Round	KO (Right High Kick)	1	1:40	Osaka, Japan	Seidokaikan rules
June 25, 1993	Loss	(England) Michael Thompson	K-1 Sanctuary III	KO (Left High Kick)	1	0:47	Osaka, Japan	Seidokaikan rules
April 30, 1993	Loss	(Switzerland) Andy Hug	K-1 Grand Prix '93	KO (Left Knee)	2	1:26	Tokyo, Japan	Seidokaikan rules
October 2, 1992	Loss	(Switzerland) Andy Hug	1992 Seidokaikan Karate World Cup - Second Round	Ippon				Seidokaikan rules
March 26, 1992	Draw	(United States) Willie Williams	Kakutogi Olympics I	Draw	3	2:00	Tokyo, Japan	Kyokushin rules
June 4, 1991	Win	Gary Klugiewicz	USA Oyama Karate vs Shodo Karate - Last Chance	Ext. R Decision (Unanimous)				Kyokushin rules

== Mixed martial arts record ==
=== Mixed rules ===
0 Wins, 1 Loss (1 KO), 0 Draws
Date	Result	Opponent	Event	Method	Round	Time	Location	Notes
January 25, 1992	Loss	(Netherlands) Rob Kaman	RINGS Battle Dimensions Tournament 1992 - Opening Round	TKO (Knee Drop)	3	2:03	Tokyo, Japan	

== Filmography ==
=== Films ===
Year	Title	Role	Notes
1996	Ultraman Zearth	Instructor of Seidokaikan	
1997	Ultraman Zearth 2	Instructor of Seidokaikan	
2001	Kinnikuman nisei: Second Generations	Narrator (voice)	
2001	Godzilla, Mothra and King Ghidorah: Giant Monsters All-Out Attack	Commanding Sector Officer	Credited as Nobuo Kakuda
2003	Shin karate baka ichidai 2		Video release
2003	Spy Kids 3-D: Game Over	Toymaker	Japanese dub
2004	Godzilla: Final Wars		
2007	Shin kyûseishu densetsu Hokuto no Ken: Raô den - Gekitô no shô	Akashachi (voice)	
2007	Detective Story		
2013	The Wolverine	Buddhist Priest	
2015	Meikyû Cafe		

=== Television ===
Year	Title	Role	Notes
2001	Pokémon	Shijima (voice)	
2002	Manten		
2007	Fist of the Blue Sky	Hôsaku Ôkawa (voice)	
2009	Heart of a Samurai		
2015	Kabukimono Keiji		
2015	Kodoku no Gourmet		
