= Jean-Claude Leuyer =

American kickboxer (born 1970)

- Born: Jean-Claude P. Leuyer; November 30, 1970 (age 55); Phoenix, Arizona, U.S.
- Nationality: (United States) American
- Height: 6 ft 3 in (1.91 m)
- Weight: 226 lb (103 kg; 16.1 st)
- Division: Heavyweight
- Style: Kickboxing, Muay Thai
- Stance: Southpaw
- Fighting out of: San Jose, California, U.S.
- Team: Fairtex Gym
- Trainer: Javier Mendez

Professional boxing record
- Total: 7
- Wins: 3
- By knockout: 2
- Losses: 4
- By knockout: 4
- Draws: 0

Kickboxing record
- Total: 51
- Wins: 39
- By knockout: 34
- Losses: 11
- Draws: 1

Other information
- Boxing record from BoxRec

Jean-Claude Leuyer (born November 30, 1970), or simply Jean Claude, is an American former heavyweight kickboxer. He was a six-time world champion, holding titles in four different organizations, and competing in sixteen world title fights. He holds notable wins over Rob Kaman and Tomasz Kucharzewski in K-1.

== Career ==
=== Early career ===
Although a Muay Thai fighter by trade, Leuyer first began practicing martial arts at the age of five with Shotokan karate. He came to prominence in 1994 when he won the USMTA Heavyweight Championship. He then won the ISKA Intercontinental Super Heavyweight Freestyle Championship by defeating Hirawi Te Rangi of New Zealand on March 13, 1994. Later in his career, he also held the ISKA World Super Heavyweight Freestyle Championship and ISKA World Super Heavyweight Muay Thai Championship.

=== Invitation to K-1 ===
In 1996, Leuyer was invited to take part in the K-1 World Grand Prix, the annual gathering of the world's best heavyweight kickboxers in Japan. Billed simply as "Jean Claude" in the promotion, he made his debut against Peter Aerts at the K-1 Grand Prix '96 Opening Battle in Yokohama on March 10, 1996. Towards the end of the first round, Aerts violently knocked Leuyer out with a right high kick.

He returned at the K-1 Grand Prix '96 in a superfight against Aerts' teammate Rene Rooze on May 6, 1996. Rooze knocked Leuyer down little over a minute into the fight before knocking him out with a flurry of punches seconds later.

His third fight in K-1 came against yet another Dutchman, the legendary Rob Kaman, at K-1 Hercules '96 on December 12, 1996 in Nagoya. Kaman dominated the fight until the fifth round, wherein he suffered a cut shin. Leuyer was awarded a technical knockout win.

Following this, he picked up another win over Frenchman Stephane Reveillon when he stopped him in round three at K-1 Kings '97 on March 3, 1997 in Yokohama. He then rematched Peter Aerts at K-1 Braves '97 on April 29, 1997. He was unable to take revenge, however, and was stopped in the second round.

After defeating Achille Roger on May 31, 1997 in San Jose, California, Leuyer returned to Japan to fight for the WKBA World Super Heavyweight Championship against Ray Sefo at K-1 Dream '97 on July 20, 1997. Although good friends, they put on one of the most brutal fights in K-1 history, with Sefo taking the unanimous decision after seven rounds.

He was invited back to the K-1 World GP again in 1997, but once again made it no further than the opening round as he was knocked out in round two by Australia's Sam Greco at the K-1 Grand Prix '97 1st round on September 7, 1997.

In October 1997, he met Ray Sefo in a rematch only to suffer the same fate once more, losing a decision.

=== Later career ===
On May 24, 1998, Leuyer fought Maurice Smith for the Draka World Super Heavyweight Championship in Los Angeles, California, but the bout was ruled a draw. After this, he was invited to the K-1 USA Grand Prix '98 in Las Vegas, Nevada on August 7, 1998. He defeated karateka Tomasz Kucharzewski by TKO in the quarter-finals, only to be KO'd by Curtis Shuster in the semis.

He made a defence of his ISKA World Super Heavyweight Freestyle Championship against Andrei Dudko on May 15, 2000 in San Jose, California, stopping the challenger with a low kick in the fifth round. As the fight was entertaining and evenly-matched, a rematch was scheduled to take place in Moscow, Russia. Leuyer refused, however, and was stripped of his title.

On September 15, 2000, he was eliminated at the quarter-final stage of the K-1 USA Championships 2000 in Las Vegas, when he was TKO'd by Paul Lalonde in round two. Leuyer returned at the K-1 World Grand Prix 2001 Preliminary USA on May 5, 2001, but fared no better and was beaten on decision by Michael McDonald at the opening stage once again.

Leuyer won back his ISKA World Super Heavyweight Freestyle title on September 29, 2001 in San Jose when he defeated Jeff Ford by TKO in round eight.

His last foray into K-1 came the following year on May 3 at the K-1 World Grand Prix 2002 Preliminary USA in Las Vegas where he was defeated via unanimous decision by Dewey Cooper in the quarter-finals.

== Personal life ==
Since his retirement from fighting, Leuyer has appeared in a number of films as an actor and stunt man, including Jet Li's Fearless. He is also a trainer at the American Kickboxing Academy.

== Titles ==
- IFCA
  - IFCA Muay Thai World Championship
- International Sport Karate Association
  - ISKA Intercontinental Super Heavyweight Freestyle Championship
  - ISKA World Super Heavyweight Freestyle Championship
  - ISKA World Super Heavyweight Muay Thai Championship
- USHE
  - USHE Heavyweight Championship
- United States Muay Thai Association
  - USMTA Heavyweight Muay Thai Championship

== Kickboxing record ==
Kickboxing record
39 wins (34 KOs), 11 losses, 1 Draw
Date	Result	Opponent	Event	Location	Method	Round	Time	Notes
May 3, 2002	Loss	(United States) Dewey Cooper	K-1 World Grand Prix 2002 Preliminary USA	Las Vegas, Nevada, USA	Decision (unanimous)	3	3:00	2002 K-1 USA Grand Prix quarter-final.
September 29, 2001	Win	(United States) Jeff Ford	Strikeforce	San Jose, California, USA	TKO (corner stoppage)	8	-	Wins ISKA World Super Heavyweight Freestyle Championship.
May 5, 2001	Loss	(Canada) Michael McDonald	K-1 World Grand Prix 2001 Preliminary USA	Las Vegas, Nevada, USA	Decision (split)	3	3:00	2001 K-1 USA Grand Prix quarter-final.
September 15, 2000	Loss	(Canada) Paul Lalonde	K-1 USA Championships 2000	Las Vegas, Nevada, USA	TKO	2	2:31	2000 K-1 USA Grand Prix quarter-final.
May 15, 2000	Win	(Belarus) Andrei Dudko	Strikeforce	San Jose, California, USA	KO (low kick)	5	-	Defends ISKA World Super Heavyweight Freestyle Championship.
November 20, 1999	Loss	(France) Cyril Abidi		Marseilles, France	KO	-	-	
August 7, 1998	Loss	(United States) Curtis Shuster	K-1 USA Grand Prix '98	Las Vegas, Nevada, USA	KO (punch)	2	2:29	1998 K-1 USA Grand Prix semi-final.
August 7, 1998	Win	(Poland) Tomasz Kucharzewski	K-1 USA Grand Prix '98	Las Vegas, Nevada, USA	TKO (corner stoppage)	1	3:00	1998 K-1 USA Grand Prix quarter-final.
May 24, 1998	Draw	(United States) Maurice Smith	Draka V	Los Angeles, California, USA	Decision draw	-	-	For Draka World Super Heavyweight Championship.
October 1997	Loss	(New Zealand) Ray Sefo			Decision	5	3:00	
September 7, 1997	Loss	(Australia) Sam Greco	K-1 Grand Prix '97 1st round	Osaka, Japan	KO (right hook)	2	1:55	1997 K-1 World Grand Prix opening round.
July 20, 1997	Loss	(New Zealand) Ray Sefo	K-1 Dream '97	Nagoya, Japan	Decision (unanimous)	7	3:00	For WKBA World Super Heavyweight Championship.
May 31, 1997	Win	(France) Achille Roger		San Jose, California, USA		-	-	
April 29, 1997	Loss	(Netherlands) Peter Aerts	K-1 Braves '97	Fukuoka, Japan	TKO (referee stoppage)	2	2:08	
March 3, 1997	Win	(France) Stephane Reveillon	K-1 Kings '97	Yokohama, Japan	KO (low kicks)	3	2:06	
December 12, 1996	Win	(Netherlands) Rob Kaman	K-1 Hercules '96	Nagoya, Japan	KO (Left mid kick)	5	0:43	
May 6, 1996	Loss	(Netherlands) Rene Rooze	K-1 Grand Prix '96	Yokohama, Japan	KO (punches)	1	1:50	
March 10, 1996	Loss	(Netherlands) Peter Aerts	K-1 Grand Prix '96 Opening Battle	Yokohama, Japan	KO (right high kick)	1	2:43	1996 K-1 World Grand Prix opening round.
March 13, 1994	Win	(New Zealand) Hirawi Te Rangi		USA		2	-	Wins ISKA Intercontinental Super Heavyweight Freestyle Championship.
1994	Win	(United States) Gerold Curray		Phoenix, Arizona, USA	TKO	2	-	Defends USMTA Heavyweight Championship.
Legend: Win Loss Draw/no contest
