= Seidokaikan =

Japanese martial arts/Karate entity

- Focus: Striking
- Hardness: Full-contact
- Country of origin: Japan
- Creator: Kazuyoshi Ishii
- Parenthood: Kyokushin
- Official website: seido.co.jp

Seidokaikan (正道会館) is a traditional full contact karate derived from Kyokushin by Kazuyoshi Ishii. Seidokaikan organized the first professional full contact karate tournament named the Karate World Cup. The Karate World Cup had special extension rounds; if the judge's decision was deadlocked after an extension round, the rules then allowed face strikes with fighters donning boxing gloves (kickboxing).

== History ==
In 1981, Kazuyoshi Ishii established his own style of karate, forming the International Practical Karate Federation Seidokaikan, and became the Kancho (Grandmaster) of Seidokaikan based in Osaka. Kancho Ishii's top student at this time was Takeo Nakayama, who had achieved fame by taking second place in the 1977 Kyokushin All-Japan tournament as a green belt.

In 1983, Kancho published a karate technical manual entitled "Full Contact Seido Karate". The following month the first of a four-part educational video series "Practical Seido Karate" (the first of its kind in Japan) was produced. In 1991, Kancho Ishii's "Katsu Tame no Karate" (Winning Karate) book was published with a companion video.

Seidokaikan can be confused with Seido, the World Seido Karate Organization, a traditional non-contact karate style with a similar name established in 1976 by former Kyokushin karateka Tadashi Nakamura and also with Seidokan Karate Kobudo, a traditional karate style established by Shian Toma in 1984.

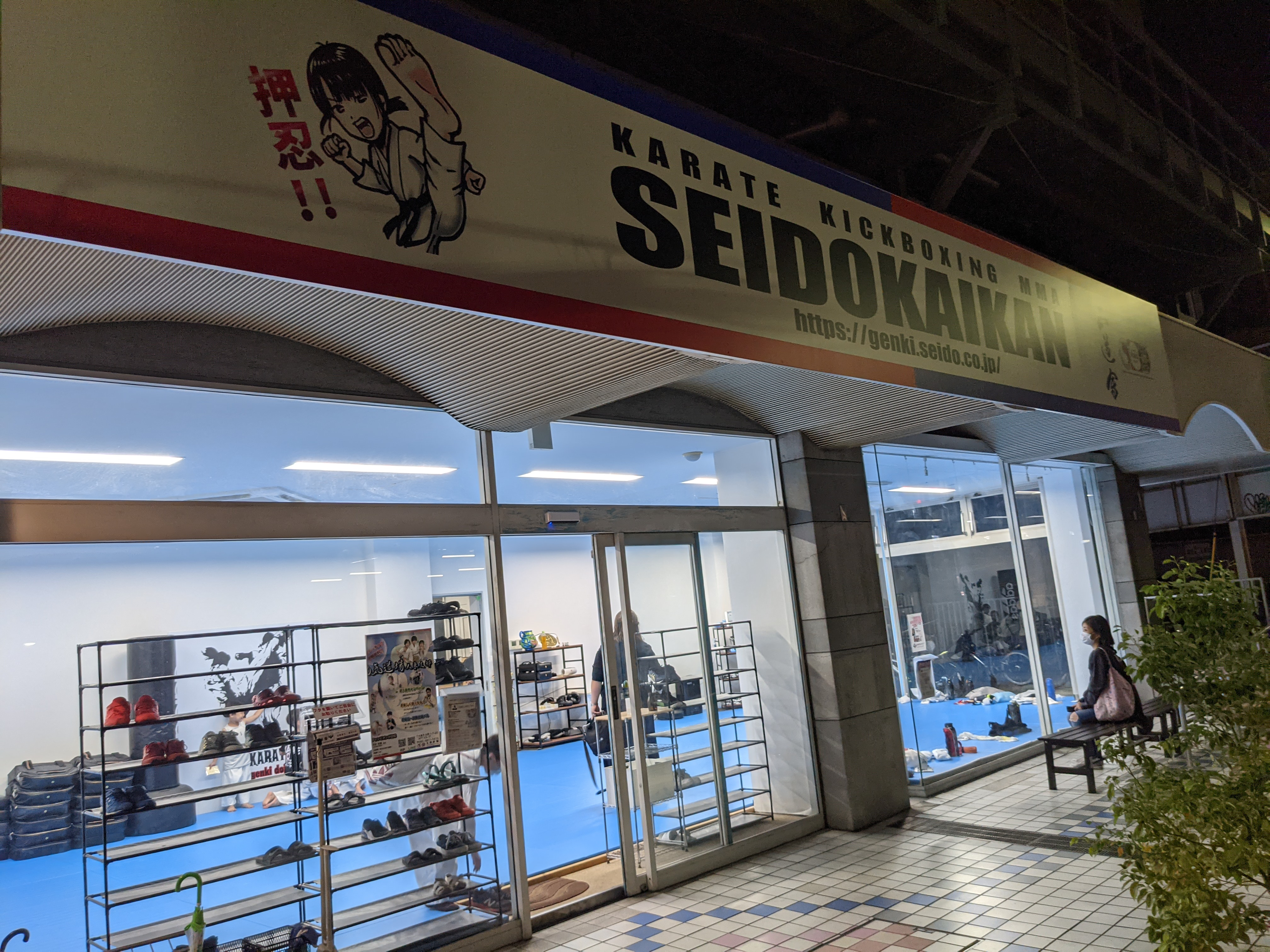
A Seidokaikan dojo

== Tournaments ==
In 1982, Seidokaikan held its first All-Japan Knockdown Open tournament. This initial event attracted over 3,500 people to the Osaka Prefectural Gymnasium. Over the next several years the Seidokaikan All-Japan Open tournament became a showpiece in Western Japan, and by 1989 the tournament was attracting over 8,000 fans, bringing competitors from more than 20 styles of karate.

In 1988, at the 7th All-Japan Knockdown Open tournament, new rules were used for the first time allowing face strikes wearing boxing gloves for extension rounds.

In 1990, Dutch Kyokushin fighter Peter Smit competed in the 8th All-Japan Knockdown Open tournament. In June 1991, 4,500 people crowded into Tokyo's Yoyogi Hall to watch a 5 on 5 challenge match between Seidokaikan and World Oyama Karate with Willie Williams competing.

In October 1991, Seidokaikan held the first Karate World Cup in Japan, which brought together fighters from around the world to compete in an open-weight tournament fought in a boxing ring. The Karate World Cup rules differed from conventional full-contact karate tournaments, providing fighters with the opportunity to win by kickboxing, if a winner was not found in the karate rounds. In the karate rounds, if the judges' decision was deadlocked after an extension round and there was no winner by weight difference, the rules then made face strikes legal; fighters donned boxing gloves and kickboxing was permitted for further extension rounds. If the judges' decision was still deadlocked after these extension rounds then the fighter who broke (tameshiwari) the greatest number of tiles would be the winner.

The Karate World Cup was the first ever professional full-contact karate tournament with fighters paid to participate, in addition to being able to collect prize money for winning. This event attracted Dutch Kyokushin fighters Peter Smit and Gerard Gordeau.The former European Kyokushin champion Gordeau was beaten by then unknown Adam Watt who was Seidokaikan first non-Japanese live in students.

In March 1992, the Karate Olympics I show was held at the Tokyo Gymnasium with Nobuaki Kakuda fighting American Willie Williams. In May, the Karate Olympics II show was held at Tokyo's Yoyogi Hall with Swiss Kyokushin champion Andy Hug fighting Toshiyuki Yanagisawa. Andy Hug joined Siedokaikan.

In October 1992, the 2nd Karate World Cup attracted American kickboxer Dale Cook, and was ultimately won by Andy Hug. Australian Kyokushin champion Sam Greco joined Seidokaikan.

In 1993, English Kyokushin champion Michael Thompson joined Seidokaikan. Seidokaikan founder Kancho Ishii created a kickboxing organization promoted as K-1. The first K-1 competition, named K-1 Grand Prix, was held in April 1993, and included contests between Andy Hug and Nobuaki Kakuda, and Michael Thompson fighting Kin Taiei. The second K-1 competition named K-1 Sanctuary III held in June 1993 included three karate fights with Andy Hug fighting Minoru Fujita, Michael Thompson fighting Nobuaki Kakuda, and Sam Greco fighting Keisuke Nakagawa.

In October 1993, the 3rd Karate World Cup was won by Satake Masaaki in a contentious judges' decision. In the final, Andy Hug fought two rounds against Satake Masaaki, but the judges remained deadlocked after an extension round. The fight then went into a further two extension rounds, with fighters donning boxing gloves and with face strikes allowed. Again, the judges' decision was deadlocked. Satake Masaaki was declared the winner after breaking more tiles than his opponent. The 3rd attracted foreign competitors Kyokushin fighter David Pickthall, Muay Thai kickboxer Changpuek Kiatsongrit and American karate champion Patrick Smith.

In October 1994, the 4th Karate World Cup was won by Sam Greco who downed Michael Thompson in the first round with a left low kick followed by a straight right body shot. The 4th had 48 participants including Dutch Kyokushin fighter Kenneth Felter, German Kyokushin fighter André Mewis (placed 5th), American kickboxer Duke Roufus, and English kickboxer Gary Sandland.

In June 1995, the K-1 competition named K-1 Fight Night held in Switzerland included a karate fight between Michael Thompson and Swiss Kyokushin fighter Rene Papais.

In October 1995, the 5th Karate World Cup had 56 participants, with 44 Japanese fighters, and 12 foreign fighters from Switzerland, Australia, Germany, Holland including Kyokushin fighter John Kleijn, United States and England including Kyokushin fighter Felix Ntumazah who placed 5th.

Seidokaikan held the last professional Karate World Cup in 1995. Seidokaikan fighters entered the professional kickboxing organization K-1 being promoted by Kancho Ishii.

Seidokaikan continues to hold the amateur annual All-Japan Tournament which in 1996 returned to traditional full contact rules.

== Karate World Cup Winners ==
Karate World Cup results
Year	1st	2nd	3rd	4th
1991	Toshiyuki Atokawa	Adam Watt	Tagami Yoshihisa	Takezawa Nobuaki
1992	Andy Hug	Kin Taiei	Toshiyuki Atokawa	Suzuki Shuji
1993	Satake Masaaki	Andy Hug	Toshiyuki Atokawa	Kin Taiei
1994	Sam Greco	Michael Thompson	Kenneth Felter	Minami Takehiro
1995	Kin Taiei	Toshiyuki Atokawa	Koyasu Shingo	Akio Mori (Musashi)

== Present ==
Seidokaikan has schools all over Japan as well as in Greece, Switzerland, Poland, Germany and America. Famous karateka include Nobuaki Kakuda, Satake Masaaki, Toshiyuki Atokawa, Toshiyuki Yanagisawa, Akio Mori (Musashi), Adam Watt, Arne Soldwedel and Takeru Yokawa.

== See also ==
- Full contact karate
- K-1
