= K-1 Revenge =

1997 video game

- Developer: Daft
- Publishers: JP: Xing Entertainment; NA: Jaleco
- Series: K-1 Fighting
- Platform: PlayStation
- Release: JP: September 25, 1997; NA: March 2, 1999
- Genres: Sports, fighting
- Modes: Single-player, multiplayer

K-1 Revenge, known in Japan as Fighting Illusion: K-1 Revenge (ファイティングイリュージョン 〜K-1 リベンジ〜, Faitingu Iryūjon 〜K-1 Ribenji〜), is a video game based on the K-1 martial arts organization in Hong Kong, developed by Daft and published by Xing Entertainment in Japan in 1997, and by Jaleco in North America in 1999. It is the fifth game in the K-1 Fighting series.

== Reception ==
Reception

Aggregate score
| Aggregator | Score |
|---|---|
| GameRankings | 60% |

Review scores
| Publication | Score |
|---|---|
| CNET Gamecenter | 7/10 |
| Electronic Gaming Monthly | 6.5/10 |
| Famitsu | 25/40 |
| Game Informer | 6.5/10 |
| GameFan | 72% (Note: In GameFan's viewpoint of the game, one critic gave it 70, and the other 73.) |
| GamePro | 4/5 (Note: GamePro gave the game two 3.5/5 scores for graphics and control, and two 4/5 scores for sound and overall fun factor.) |
| GameSpot | 5.2/10 |
| Official U.S. PlayStation Magazine | 2.5/5 |
| PlayStation: The Official Magazine | 2.5/5 |

The game received mixed reviews according to the review aggregation website GameRankings. In Japan, Famitsu gave it a score of 25 out of 40.
