= W.A.K.O. World Championships 1979 =

Kickboxing championships

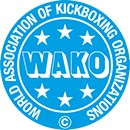
- The poster for W.A.K.O. World Championships 1979
- Promotion: W.A.K.O.
- Date: November 3 (Start); November 4, 1979 (End)
- Venue: Hillsborough Community College
- City: (United States) Tampa, Florida, USA

Event chronology
W.A.K.O. European Championships 1979	W.A.K.O. World Championships 1979	W.A.K.O. European Championships 1980

W.A.K.O. World Championships 1979 were the second ever world kickboxing championships hosted by W.A.K.O., organized by American Mike Anderson. They were open to amateur men only from across the world, with two styles of kickboxing - Full-Contact and Semi-Contact - on offer. This was the championships where the (now) world famous martial artist turned actor Jean-Claude Van Damme was supposed to have competed – although reports on the event and from participating fighters give no confirmation of Van Damme ever participating. By the end of the championships West Germany was the strongest nation, Italy were second, Great Britain third. The event was held at the Hillsborough Community College in Tampa, Florida, USA between November 3 and 4 in 1979.

== Men's Full-Contact Kickboxing ==
The Full-Contact category at Tampa had seven weight divisions, ranging from 57 kg/125.4 lbs to over 84 kg/+184.8 lbs, with all bouts fought under Full-Contact rules. More detail on Full-Contact's rules-set can be found at the W.A.K.O. website, although be aware that the rules have changed since 1979. The medal winners of each division are shown below with notable winners being Tony Palmore who won his second gold medal at a W.A.K.O. world championships and reigning W.A.K.O. European champion and future K-1 world champion Branko Cikatić picking up a bronze medal. By the end of the event, West Germany were the strongest nation in Full-Contact, winning two golds and two silvers.

=== Men's Full-Contact Kickboxing Medals Table ===
Event	Gold	Silver	Bronze
-57 kg	Howard Brown (United Kingdom)	Michael Kuhr (West Germany)	Jesus Duran (Dominican Republic); Max Mankowitz (Norway)
-63 kg	Ali Pehlivan (West Germany)	Godfrey Butler (United Kingdom)	Jonny Mirer (Switzerland); Jimmy Barletta (Belgium)
-69 kg	Ferdinand Mack (West Germany)	Javier Reyes (Dominican Republic)	Sandry Ravessoud (Switzerland); Walter Parlovic (Socialist Federal Republic of Yugoslavia)
-74 kg	Franz Haller (Italy)	Harold Roth (United States)	Alfred Tommey (Switzerland); Branko Cikatić (Socialist Federal Republic of Yugoslavia)
-79 kg	Jean-Marc Tonus (Switzerland)	Dieter Herdel (West Germany)	Benny Hedlund (Sweden); F. Okkonowiak (Netherlands)
-84 kg	Flavio Galessi (Italy)	Branko Zgaljardic (Socialist Federal Republic of Yugoslavia)	Juan Ponce (Switzerland); Gary Sproule (United States)
+84 kg	Tony Palmore (United States)	Harold Ehmann (Austria)	Mladen Carevic (Socialist Federal Republic of Yugoslavia)

== Men's Semi-Contact Kickboxing ==
Semi-Contact returned to the 1979 world championships, having been absent from the 1978 world championships. Semi-Contact differed from Full-Contact in that fights were won by using skill, speed and technique to score points rather than by excessive force - more detail on Semi-Contact rules can be found at the official W.A.K.O. website, although be aware that the rules will have changed since 1979. Like Full-Contact there were seven weight divisions ranging from 57 kg/125.4 lbs to over 84 kg/+184.8 lbs. The medal winners of each division are shown below with West Germany being the top nation in Semi-Contact by the championships end.

=== Men's Semi-Contact Kickboxing Medals Table ===
Event	Gold	Silver	Bronze
-57 kg	Alessandro Ortelli (Italy)	Sarhan Salman (West Germany)	F. Infantone (Norway)
-63 kg	Andreas Lindemann (West Germany)	Jim Hakkens (Netherlands)	Thomas Volken (Switzerland)
-69 kg	Andreas Brannasch (West Germany)	Patrick Teugels (Belgium)	Goyvaerts (Morocco)
-74 kg	Hans-Peter Weinhold (Austria)	Durovic (Socialist Federal Republic of Yugoslavia)	Homero De Moya (Dominican Republic)
-79 kg	James Cisco (United States)	Ivan Wray (United Kingdom)	Flavio Galessi (Italy)
-84 kg	Harald Edel (West Germany)	Walter Meneghini (Italy)	Streicher (Austria)
+84 kg	Norman McKenzie (United Kingdom)	Urich Falk (Switzerland)	Anne Delis (Netherlands)

== Overall Medals Standing (Top 5) ==
Ranking	Country	Gold (gold)	Silver (silver)	Bronze (bronze)
1	West Germany	5	3	0
2	Italy	3	1	1
3	(United Kingdom) Great Britain	2	2	0
4	(United States) USA	2	1	1
5	Switzerland	1	1	5

== See also ==
- List of WAKO Amateur World Championships
- List of WAKO Amateur European Championships
