= Jean Rivière =

Canadian martial artist

- Born: July 2, 1971 (age 55)
- Nationality: Canadian
- Height: 1.88 m (6 ft 2 in)
- Weight: 130.0 kg (286.6 lb; 20.47 st)
- Division: Heavyweight
- Style: Kyokushin
- Stance: Southpaw
- Fighting out of: Montreal, Quebec, Canada
- Rank: Black belt in Kyokushin; Black belt in Judo
- Years active: 1995–1999, 2007 (MMA); 1996–1998 (Kickboxing)

Kickboxing record
- Total: 5
- Wins: 1
- By knockout: 1
- Losses: 4
- By knockout: 2
- Draws: 0

Mixed martial arts record
- Total: 4
- Wins: 3
- By knockout: 1
- By submission: 1
- Unknown: 1
- Losses: 1
- Unknown: 1
- Draws: 0

Jean Rivière (born July 2, 1971) is a Canadian former Kyokushin karateka, kickboxer and mixed martial artist. A heavyweight competitor fighting out of Montreal, Rivière reached the semi-finals at the 5th Kyokushin World Open in 1991 and later embarked on a career in the K-1 kickboxing promotion and the burgeoning MMA scene of the mid-1990s.

== Career ==
The Montreal-based Jean Rivière came to prominence as a Kyokushin fighter, with the most notable achievement of his karate career coming in November 1991 at the 5th Kyokushin World Open in Tokyo where he finished fourth in a tournament of 250 competitors. He defeated Tatsuya Iwasaki (with an ushiro mawashi geri) in the round of thirty-two, Lars Bjorstrup in the round of sixteen and Johnny Kleyn in the quarter-finals before losing to Akira Masuda in the semi-finals.

Rivière would later transition to mixed martial arts, making his debut in Brazil on December 1, 1995 where he knocked out capoeira stylist Mestre Hulk in nineteen seconds. He then faced a nineteen-year-old Carlos Newton at Battlecade Extreme Fighting's second event in Montreal on April 26, 1996. Rivière had a large size advantage, reportedly outweighing Newton by 34 kg / 75 lb, but Newton dominated much of the fight with headbutts and superior grappling transitions before submitting due to exhaustion just over seven minutes into the fight.

Later that year, Rivière joined the ranks of the Japanese kickboxing promotion K-1. In his first outing, he recorded a second round low kick stoppage win over Fred Floyd at K-1 Revenge '96 on September 1, 1996 before losing a five-round unanimous decision to Musashi at K-1 Star Wars '96 the following month. Rivière was invited to compete in the 1997 K-1 World Grand Prix, losing to fellow karateka Masaaki Satake in the tournament's opening round on September 7, 1997. The bout was scored a draw following the regulation three rounds and went into an extension round to decide the winner, after which Satake was ruled the victor by all three judges.

Rivière faced reigning K-1 World Grand Prix champion Ernesto Hoost at K-1 Braves '98 on May 24, 1998, losing by head kick knockout in the first round. In his final appearance in the kickboxing ring, Rivière competed at the K-1 USA Grand Prix '98 in Las Vegas, K-1's first event in the United States, on August 7, 1998. He suffered a second-round knockout loss to Curtis Schuster at the quarter-final stage, bringing his K-1 career to a close on a 1–4 record.

With his stint in K-1 at an end, Rivière returned to MMA on January 9, 1999 with a loss to John Dixson in Montreal. After an eight-year absence from the sport, he defeated Shaun Fukuhara in Hawaii on August 4, 2007.

== Kickboxing record ==
Kickboxing record
1 win (1 KO), 4 losses, 0 draws
Date	Result	Opponent	Event	Location	Method	Round	Time	Record
1998-08-07	Loss	(United States) Curtis Schuster	K-1 USA Grand Prix '98, Quarter-finals	Las Vegas, Nevada, USA	KO (punch)	2	2:52	1–4
1998-05-24	Loss	(Netherlands) Ernesto Hoost	K-1 Braves '98	Fukuoka, Japan	KO (right high kick)	1	2:17	1–3
1997-09-07	Loss	(Japan) Masaaki Satake	K-1 Grand Prix '97 1st round	Osaka, Japan	Extension round decision (unanimous)	4	3:00	1–2
1996-10-18	Loss	(Japan) Musashi	K-1 Star Wars '96	Yokohama, Japan	Decision (unanimous)	5	3:00	1–1
1996-09-01	Win	(United States) Fred Floyd	K-1 Revenge '96	Osaka, Japan	KO (left low kick)	2	1:29	1–0
Legend: Win Loss Draw/No contest Notes

== Mixed martial arts record ==
Professional record breakdown
4 matches	3 wins	1 loss
By knockout	1	0
By submission	1	0
Unknown	1	1

Res.	Record	Opponent	Method	Event	Date	Round	Time	Location	Notes
Win	3-1	(United States) Shaun Fukuhara	N/A	Island Warriors Fighting Championships	August 4, 2007	N/A	N/A	Wailuku, Hawaii, United States	
Loss	2-1	(United States) John Dixson	N/A	IFC: Extreme Combat	January 9, 1999	1	5:13	Montreal, Quebec, Canada	
Win	2-0	(Canada) Carlos Newton	Submission (exhaustion)	Extreme Fighting 2	April 26, 1996	1	7:22	Montreal, Quebec, Canada	
Win	1-0	(Brazil) Mestre Hulk	KO (punch)	Brazil Open '95	December 1, 1995	1	0:19	Brazil	
