= Masaaki Satake =

Japanese karateka, kickboxer, professional wrestler and mixed martial arts fighter

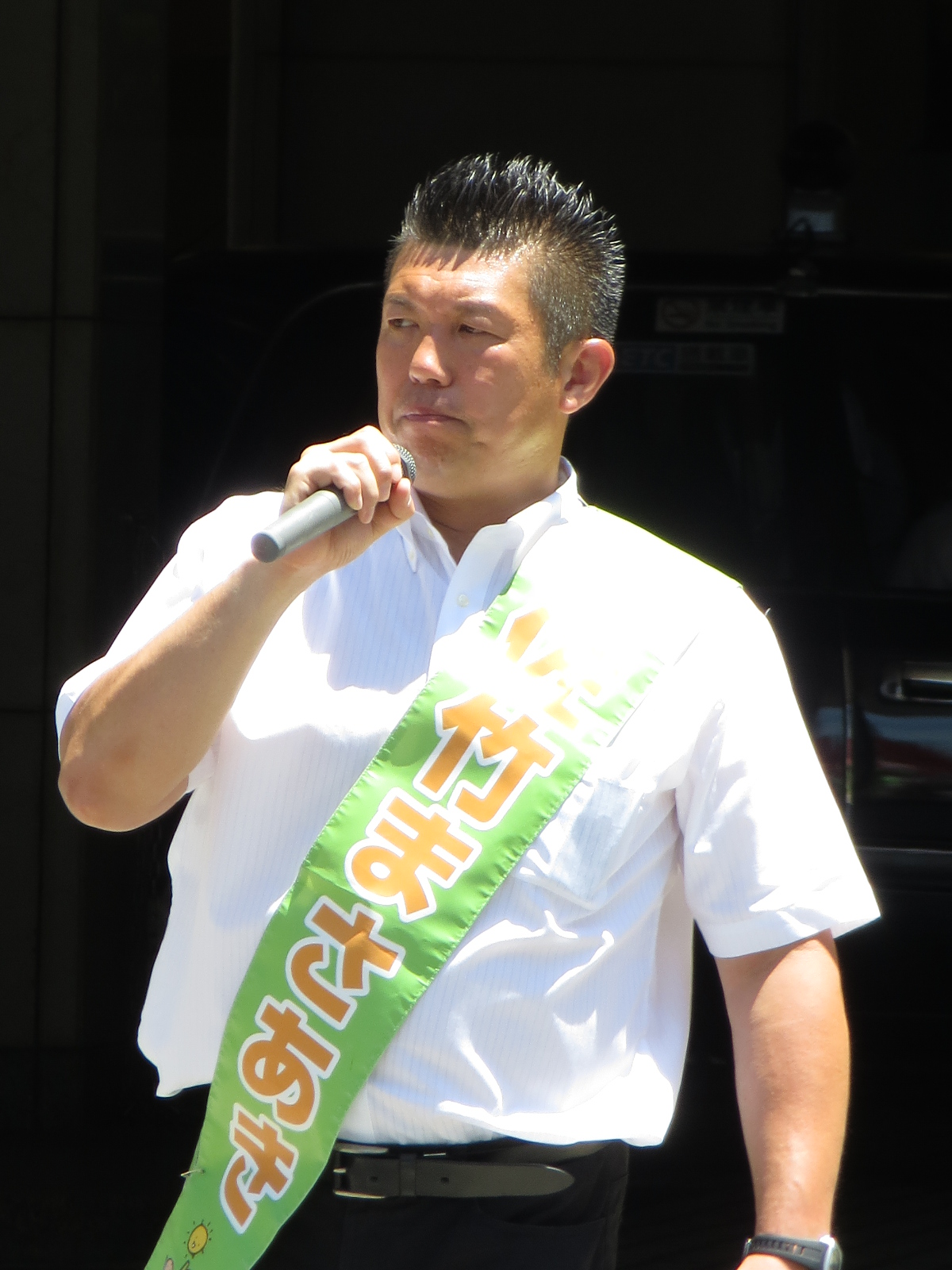
- Satake in 2013
- Born: 17 August 1965 (age 61); Suita, Osaka, Japan
- Native name: 佐竹雅昭
- Other names: The Monster Prince
- Nationality: Japanese
- Height: 1.85 m (6 ft 1 in)
- Weight: 106 kg (234 lb; 16.7 st)
- Division: Heavyweight
- Style: MMA; Kyokushin karate, Karate, Kickboxing
- Team: Seidokaikan; Takada Dojo
- Years active: 1984–1994 (Karate); 1990–1999 (Kickboxing); 1991-1992, 2002-2003 (Pro wrestling); 2000–2002 (MMA)

Kickboxing record
- Total: 40
- Wins: 24
- By knockout: 17
- Losses: 12
- By knockout: 8
- Draws: 4

Mixed martial arts record
- Total: 10
- Wins: 1
- By knockout: 1
- Losses: 8
- By knockout: 2
- By submission: 3
- By decision: 3
- Draws: 1

Other information
- University: Kansai University
- Mixed martial arts record from Sherdog
- Last updated on: August 5, 2012

Masaaki Satake
Medal record

Representing Japan

Men's Karate

All Japan Karate Championships
Silver medal – second place	1985	Heavyweight
Silver medal – second place	1986	Heavyweight
Gold medal – first place	1987	Heavyweight
Gold medal – first place	1988	Heavyweight
Gold medal – first place	1989	Heavyweight
Bronze medal – third place	1990	Heavyweight

Karate Real Tournament
Silver medal – second place	1988	Heavyweight
Gold medal – first place	1989	Heavyweight

Shidokan Open
Gold medal – first place	1988	Heavyweight

Japan Martial Arts Festival
Gold medal – first place	1989	Heavyweight

Towa Cup Open
Gold medal – first place	1992	Heavyweight
Gold medal – first place	1993	Heavyweight

K-1 World Cup
Gold medal – first place	Osaka 1993	Heavyweight

Masaaki Satake (Japanese: 佐竹 雅昭, Satake Masaaki; born August 17, 1965) is a Japanese former heavyweight karateka, kickboxer, professional wrestler and mixed martial artist. He is one of the pioneering heavyweight fighters in K-1, having been a member of Kazuyoshi Ishii's Seidokaikan school.

== Early life and karate career ==
Satake began practicing karate after being inspired by the publications of Mas Oyama in junior high school. After graduating from Kansai University with a major in English, he turned down a job at a television studio in order to practice martial arts full-time. Within three years, he was fighting professionally at the national level, placing fourth in the 3rd All Japan Karate Championships of 1984. Half a decade later, he was regularly placing first in Japan's largest tournaments and ranked among the country's most successful karateka.

During October 2–3, 1993, Satake participated in his final karate tournament to date - the K-1 Illusion 1993 Karate World Cup. After defeating Patrick Smith and Adam Watt on the first day and Taiei Kin on the second, he met fellow karate superstar Andy Hug in the finals. When judges were unable to determine a winner, four additional overtime rounds were called, but a decisive winner still couldn't be named. The match went to sudden death via a tameshiwari content, wherein Satake bested his Swiss opponent to become world champion.

== Kickboxing career ==
Satake made his kickboxing debut against WKA US Cruiserweight Champion Don Nakaya Nielsen. Nielsen placed his opponent on the defensive in the opening moments, but Satake fought back with repeated headbutts that led to a foul being ruled. Nielsen subsequently dropped his guard, allowing Satake to land a left hook too strong for Nielsen to recover from. Despite taking a two-year break from kickboxing afterwards to focus on karate, Satake followed his initial victory up with an undefeated streak that included draws against world champions Rob Kaman and Peter Aerts - establishing himself as a Japanese powerhouse who could hold his own against the best of international competition.

=== K-1 ===
Based on his initial kickboxing record, his status as one of Japan's top karate competitors, and his affiliation with K-1 founder Kazuyoshi Ishii's Seidokaikan group, Satake was invited to participate in the first K-1 event - K-1 Sanctuary I. Following a victory over American Chris Blanner, he was invited to the company's first-ever world tournament, the K-1 Grand Prix '93. He bested future Olympic bobsledder Todd Hays in the quarterfinals before suffering his first defeat (and knockout) to Branko Cikatić, who would go on to win the tournament. Despite this loss, Satake rebounded by winning his first world title – the vacant UKF World Heavyweight Championship – from his old rival Don Nakaya Nielsen. He next defeated Stan Longinidis in a title-versus-title match, but Longinidis retained his WKA World Super Heavyweight Championship after arguing that the match was not conducted under WKA rules. Satake made up for this denial by winning the KICK World Super Heavyweight and ISKA World Heavyweight Championships in a match against American Jeff Hollins at the K-2 Grand Prix '93.

Despite suffering a loss to future K-1 megastar Ernesto Hoost at K-1 Challenge, Satake was invited to the second world tournament, the K-1 Grand Prix '94. After defeating karate champ Michael Thompson in the quarterfinals, he avenged his previous year's loss to Branko Cikatić with a decision victory over the Croatian Tiger. Satake moved on to arguably the most important match of his career: the World Grand Prix final against Peter Aerts. Despite throwing no shortage of powerful strikes at the Dutchman, Satake was unable to land many significant blows while enduring several from Aerts, and lost by unanimous decision. It was the last time Satake reached the finals of a WGP tournament.

Again, Satake rebounded from his grand prix loss with a world title win, this time securing the WKA World Muay Thai Super Heavyweight Championship in a match with Dennis Lane at K-1 Revenge. However, he lost it less than three months later to Sam Greco. It was the last world title he ever held. He entered and won two Japanese qualifying tournaments – the K-1 Dream '97 Japan Grand Prix and the K-1 Japan Grand Prix '98 – and though these accomplishments helped lead him to the WGP three more times, he did not advance beyond the semifinals. Though his wins always outnumbered his defeats, his achievements over world champion-level opponents dwindled, as he achieved little more than a 1997 decision victory over WKA World Muay Thai Champion Kirkwood Walker and a draw with hall-of-famer Maurice Smith.

On October 3, 1999, Satake attempted to qualify for the WGP one more time in a match against Musashi. Musashi defeated him by unanimous decision. Satake, who later described his opponent as "shameful" and a "bad student," disagreed with the outcome. In addition to this, his ongoing disenchantment with Kazuyoshi Ishii moved him to retire from K-1 and kickboxing in general.

At the time of his retirement, Satake was the most successful Japanese fighter active in the heavyweight division. He was a four-time world champion, a winner of two regional tournaments, and is one of only 18 competitors to have reached the WGP finals.

== Professional wrestling ==
=== Fighting Network RINGS (1991–1992) ===
Satake debuted in professional wrestling in the shoot-style promotion Fighting Network RINGS. Wearing the style's signature tights and knee boots, he fought to a draw against Hans Nijman in his first match. He went on to face Gerard Gordeau in his second bout, but the match descended into chaos when Gordeau – after being kicked in the back by Satake while facing away – began shooting on Satake with punches and knees, resulting in a brawl. Satake also had matches against Willie Peeters, Herman Renting and Maurice Smith.

He participated in the Mega Battle Tournament 1992, eliminating Mitsuya Nagai in the first round but retiring prematurely due to an injury sustained in training.

=== WRESTLE-1 (2002–2003) ===
In 2002 and 2003, Satake appeared in the first WRESTLE-1 event, promoted by All Japan Pro Wrestling and K-1. Performing under the ring name "SATA...yarn" and wearing military garments, he wrestled Abdullah the Butcher twice, being defeated both times.

== Mixed martial arts career ==
=== Pride ===
Satake made the transition to mixed martial arts with Pride Fighting Championships in 2000. At 34 years old, Satake was considered too old to perform adequately but sought to defy critics by joining the Takada Dojo, training under Kazushi Sakuraba. He was selected to participate in the Pride Grand Prix 2000, for which he tried to set up a match with Naoya Ogawa by trash-talking the world judo champion. Instead, he was instead pitted against UFC veteran and eventual tournament winner Mark Coleman. Masaaki lost the fight, being taken down easily by the American wrestler and submitted via neck crank.

His second fight was a non-tournament bout against former Pancrase fighter Guy Mezger. Satake successfully resisted Mezger's repeated takedown attempts during the first round but was taken down and controlled during the second for a unanimous decision loss.

At Pride 10, Satake earned his first victory over professional wrestler and judo specialist Kazunari Murakami. During the match, Murakami took down and mounted Satake, but the karate champion resisted. Satake eventually fell on top of Murakami during a scramble and applied ground and pound until a doctor stoppage. After the match, Murakami's teammate Naoya Ogawa appeared and traded heated words with Satake.

Despite talks for a possible match with Ogawa, no contest initially materialized due to Ogawa's scheduled match against Rickson Gracie. However, Ogawa eventually accepted a fight against Satake, which took place at Pride 11. Satake marked his opponent's leg with low kicks, but the judo champion managed to get Masaaki on the ground and submit him via rear naked choke in the second round.

At Pride 13, Satake was pitted against retired sumo and professional wrestler Tadao Yasuda. Heavily outweighed, Satake was repeatedly driven against the ropes by his adversary, impeding him from landing solid strikes and resulting in an eventual unanimous decision loss. For the rest of 2001, Satake would fight notable strikers like Igor Vovchanchyn, Semmy Schilt and Sam Greco – losing to the former two and drawing with the third.

In 2002, Masaaki fought Quinton “Rampage” Jackson at Pride 20. The fight started slowly, but Jackson walked through Satake's punches and performed a powerslam, followed by multiples knees and punches from dominant positions. Satake eventually managed to stand, only for Jackson to grab his torso and execute a German suplex, making Satake land on his head. The fight was immediately ruled a TKO win for Rampage while Satake was rushed to the hospital, where a cracked skull and a gravely injured neck were diagnosed.

Satake's final fight was a bout against judo gold medalist Hidehiko Yoshida at Inoki Bom-Ba-Ye 2000, during which he fell to a guillotine choke.

== Later career ==
After his retirement from combat sports, Satake opened the Satake Dojo karate school in Kyoto City. In 2007, he founded the Heisi Bushido school for human resource management and training and development.

In 2013, Satake was approved by the Liberal Democratic Party of Japan and received a candidacy for the 23rd House of Councilors regular election. Despite general LDP victory, Satake was not elected.

== Titles ==
Kickboxing

- K-1
  - K-1 Japan Grand Prix '98 Champion
  - K-1 Dream '97 Champion
  - K-1 Grand Prix '94 Runner-up
- World Kickboxing Association
  - 1994 WKA World Muay Thai Super Heavyweight Champion
- International Sport Karate Association
  - 1993 ISKA World Oriental Rules Heavyweight Champion
- Karate International Council of Kickboxing
  - 1993 KICK World Super Heavyweight Champion
- Universal Kickboxing Federation
  - 1993 UKF World Heavyweight Champion

Karate

- K-1 Illusion 1993 Karate World Cup Champion
- 1993 2nd Towa Cup Japan Open Tournament – 1st place
- 1992 1st Towa Cup Japan Open Tournament – 1st place
- 1990 9th All Japan Karate Championships – 3rd place
- 1989 Karate Real Tournament – 1st place
- 1989 Japan Martial Arts Festival Tournament – 1st place
- 1989 8th All Japan Karate Championships – 1st place
- 1988 8th Shidokan Open Tournament – 1st place
- 1988 7th All Japan Karate Championships – 1st place
- 1988 Karate Real Tournament – Runner-up
- 1987 6th All Japan Karate Championships – 1st place
- 1986 5th All Japan Karate Championships – Runner-up
- 1985 4th All Japan Karate Championships – Runner-up
- 1984 3rd All Japan Karate Championships – 4th place

== Kickboxing record ==
Kickboxing record
43 Fights, 24 wins (17 (T)KOs), 12 Losses, 4 Draws
Date	Result	Opponent	Event	Location	Method	Round	Time	Record
1999-10-03	Loss	(Japan) Musashi	K-1 World Grand Prix '99 opening round	Osaka, Japan	Decision (unanimous)	5	3:00	24-12-4
Fails to qualify for the K-1 World Grand Prix '99 final.
1999-08-22	Win	(Trinidad and Tobago) Gary Goodridge	K-1 Spirits '99	Tokyo, Japan	KO (kick)	3	2:47	24-11-4
1999-06-20	Win	(South Africa) Jokki Oberholtzer	K-1 Braves '99	Fukuoka, Japan	TKO (3 knockdowns)	3	2:19	23-11-4
1999-04-25	Loss	(South Africa) Mike Bernardo	K-1 Revenge '99		Decision (unanimous)	5	3:00	22-11-4
1998-12-13	Loss	(Netherlands) Peter Aerts	K-1 Grand Prix '98 Final Round	Tokyo, Japan	TKO (referee stoppage, Left Knee Strike)	1	2:40	22-10-4
1998-09-27	Win	(Brazil) Glaube Feitosa	K-1 World Grand Prix '98 opening round	Osaka, Japan	Decision (majority)	5	3:00	22-9-4
Qualifies for the K-1 Grand Prix '98 final.
1998-08-28	Win	(Japan) Tsuyoshi Nakasako	K-1 Japan Grand Prix '98 Final	Tokyo, Japan	Decision (majority)	3	3:00	21-9-4
Wins the K-1 Japan Grand Prix '98 tournament.
1998-08-28	Win	(Japan) Toru Oishi	K-1 Japan Grand Prix '98 semifinals	Tokyo, Japan	KO (left punch)	2	2:03	20-9-4
1998-08-28	Win	(Japan) Yoji Anjo	K-1 Japan Grand Prix '98 quarterfinals	Tokyo, Japan	KO (right high kick)	2	1:02	19-9-4
1998-07-18	Loss	(United Kingdom) Matt Skelton	K-1 Dream '98	Nagoya, Japan	TKO (3 knockdowns)	1	2:06	18-9-4
1998-05-24	Draw	(Japan) Musashi	K-1 Braves '98	Fukuoka, Japan	Decision Draw	5	3:00	18-8-4
1998-04-09	Draw	(United States) Maurice Smith	K-1 Kings '98	Yokohama, Japan	Decision Draw	5	3:00	18-8-3
1997-11-09	Loss	(Switzerland) Andy Hug	K-1 Grand Prix '97 Final	Tokyo, Japan	KO (left High Kick)	1	0:15	18-8-2
1997-09-07	Win	(Canada) Jean Rivière	K-1 Grand Prix '97 1st round	Osaka, Japan	2nd Ext.R decision (unanimous)	7	3:00	18-7-2
Qualifies for the K-1 Grand Prix '97 final.
1997-07-20	Win	(Japan) Masashi Suzuki	K-1 Dream '97 Japan GP Final	Nagoya, Japan	TKO (corner stoppage/towel)	4	1:17	17-7-2
Wins the K-1 Japan GP '97 tournament.
1997-07-20	Win	(Japan) Shuji Abe	K-1 Dream '97 Japan GP semifinal	Nagoya, Japan	Decision (unanimous)	3	3:00	16-7-2
1997-07-20	Win	(Japan) Sadakazu Kiyohara	K-1 Dream '97 Japan GP quarterfinal	Nagoya, Japan	TKO (right straight)	1	1:33	15-7-2
1997-06-07	Win	(United Kingdom) Kirkwood Walker	K-1 Fight Night '97	Zürich, Switzerland	Decision (unanimous)	5	3:00	14-7-2
1997-03-16	Loss	(South Africa) Mike Bernardo	K-1 Kings '97	Yokohama, Japan	TKO (right hook)	2	1:24	13-7-2
1996-10-18	Loss	(Switzerland) Andy Hug	K-1 Star Wars '96	Yokohama, Japan	Decision (unanimous)	5	3:00	13-6-2
The bout was for the vacant W.K.A. World Muay Thai Super Heavyweight Championship title.
1995-05-04	Loss	(France) Jerome Le Banner	K-1 Grand Prix '95 quarterfinal	Tokyo, Japan	KO (left hook)	3	2:32	13-5-2
1995-03-03	Win	(Germany) Kimo Leopoldo	K-1 Grand Prix '95 Opening Battle	Tokyo, Japan	TKO (3 knockdowns, Left Middle Kick)	2	2:27	13-4-2
Qualifies for the K-1 World Grand Prix 1995.
1994-12-10	Loss	(Australia) Sam Greco	K-1 Legend	Nagoya, Japan	KO (right hook)	2	1:27	12-4-2
Loses the WKA Thai Boxing World Super Heavyweight title.
1994-10-02	Win	(United Kingdom) Gary Sandland	Karate World Cup '94	Osaka, Japan	TKO (left middle kick)	2	2:28	12-3-2
1994-09-18	Win	(United States) Dennis Lane	K-1 Revenge	Yokohama, Japan	TKO (right low kick)	2	1:38	11-3-2
Wins the WKA Thai Boxing World Super Heavyweight title.
1994-04-30	Loss	(Netherlands) Peter Aerts	K-1 Grand Prix '94 Final	Tokyo, Japan	Decision (unanimous)	3	3:00	10-3-2
The bout was for the K-1 Grand Prix '94 tournament title.
1994-04-30	Win	(Croatia) Branko Cikatić	K-1 Grand Prix '94 semifinal	Tokyo, Japan	Decision (majority)	3	3:00	10-2-2
1994-04-30	Win	(United Kingdom) Michael Thompson	K-1 Grand Prix '94 quarterfinal	Tokyo, Japan	TKO (left knee attack)	3	0:34	9-2-2
1994-03-04	Loss	(Netherlands) Ernesto Hoost	K-1 Challenge	Tokyo, Japan	KO (left high kick)	2	2:45	8-2-2
1993-12-19	Win	(United States) Jeff Hollins	K-2 Grand Prix '93	Tokyo, Japan	TKO (punches)	2	1:28	8-1-2
Wins the KICK World Super Heavyweight title and ISKA Oriental Rule World Heavyweight title.
1993-09-04	Win	(Australia) Stan Longinidis	K-1 Illusion	Tokyo, Japan	Decision (unanimous)	5	3:00	7-1-2
The bout was for the UKF World Heavyweight title held by Satake and the WKA Kickboxing World Super Heavyweight title held by Longinidis. Longinidis lost but retained his title because he asserted that the bout was not under WKA rules.
1993-06-25	Win	(United States) Don Nakaya Nielsen	K-1 Illusion	Osaka, Japan	TKO (3 knockdowns/Right hook)	1	2:30	6-1-2
Wins the vacant UKF World Heavyweight title.
1993-04-30	Loss	(Croatia) Branko Cikatić	K-1 Grand Prix '93 semi-final	Tokyo, Japan	KO (left hook)	3	0:45	5-1-2
1993-04-30	Win	(United States) Todd Hays	K-1 Grand Prix '93 quarter-final	Tokyo, Japan	KO (right low kick)	2	0:45	5-0-2
1993-03-30	Win	(United States) Chris Blanner	K-1 Sanctuary I	Tokyo, Japan	KO (right hook)	2	1:39	4-0-2
1992-10-04	Draw	(Netherlands) Peter Aerts	Martial arts Olympics III: Karate World Cup '92	Osaka, Osaka, Japan	Decision Draw			3-0-2
1992-08-21	Draw	(Netherlands) Rob Kaman	RINGS Mega Battle Special: Ishizue	Tokyo, Japan	Decision Draw	5	3:00	3-0-1
1992-07-30	Win	(United States) Ahmad Muhammad	Seidokaikan Martial arts Olympics II	Tokyo, Japan	KO	1	1:57	3-0-0
1992-07-16	Win	(Netherlands) Peter Ula	RINGS Mega Battle VI		KO	4	1:02	2-0-0
1990-06-30	Win	(United States) Don Nakaya Nielsen	AJKF Inspiring Wars – Heat	Tokyo, Japan	KO	1	2:07	1-0-0
Satake's debut bout as a professional kickboxer. After the bout, Nielsen's side asserted that he lost because of Satake's headbutts.
Legend: Win Loss Draw/No contest Notes

=== Mixed rules ===
Date	Result	Opponent	Event	Location	Method	Round	Time
2000-06-11	Win	(Russia) Podryatine Denis	Ultimate Boxing		Decision (unanimous)	3	3:00
1992-03-26	Draw	(United States) Maurice Smith	Martial arts Olympics I	Tokyo, Japan	Time Over	4	
1R and 2R were fought under kickboxing rules, 3R and 4R under karate rules.
Legend: Win Loss Draw/No contest Notes

== Mixed martial arts record ==
Professional record breakdown
10 matches	1 win	8 losses
By knockout	1	2
By submission	0	3
By decision	0	3
Draws	1	

Res.	Record	Opponent	Method	Event	Date	Round	Time	Location	Notes
Loss	1-8-1	Hidehiko Yoshida	Submission (neck crank)	Inoki Bom-Ba-Ye 2002	December 31, 2002	1	0:50	Saitama, Saitama, Japan	
Loss	1-7-1	Quinton Jackson	TKO (slam)	Pride 20	April 28, 2002	1	7:18	Yokohama, Kanagawa, Japan	
Draw	1-6-1	Sam Greco	Draw	Inoki Bom-Ba-Ye 2001	December 31, 2001	5	3:00	Saitama, Saitama, Japan	
Loss	1-6	Semmy Schilt	TKO (strikes)	Pride 17	November 3, 2001	1	2:18	Tokyo, Japan	
Loss	1-5	Igor Vovchanchyn	Decision (unanimous)	Pride 15	July 29, 2001	3	5:00	Saitama, Saitama, Japan	
Loss	1-4	Tadao Yasuda	Decision (split)	Pride 13 - Collision Course	March 25, 2001	3	5:00	Saitama, Saitama, Japan	
Loss	1-3	Naoya Ogawa	Submission (rear-naked choke)	Pride 11 - Battle of the Rising Sun	October 31, 2000	2	2:01	Osaka, Japan	
Win	1-2	Kazunari Murakami	TKO (punches)	Pride 10 - Return of the Warriors	August 27, 2000	1	6:58	Saitama, Saitama, Japan	
Loss	0-2	Guy Mezger	Decision (unanimous)	Pride Grand Prix 2000 Finals	May 1, 2000	1	15:00	Tokyo, Japan	
Loss	0-1	Mark Coleman	Submission (neck crank)	Pride Grand Prix 2000 Opening Round	January 30, 2000	1	1:14	Tokyo, Japan	

=== Mixed rules ===
Professional record breakdown
0 matches	0 wins	0 losses
By knockout	1	0
By submission	0	0
By decision	0	0

Res.	Record	Opponent	Method	Event	Date	Round	Time	Location	Notes
Win	1-0	Mitsuya Nagai	KO (palm strike)	Rings: Mega Battle Tournament 1992 first round	October 29, 1992	1	1:24	Nagoya, Japan	

== Karate record ==
Karate record
Date	Result	Opponent	Event	Location	Method	Round	Time	Record
1993-10-03	Win	(Switzerland) Andy Hug	K-1 Illusion 1993 Karate World Cup Final	Osaka, Japan	Tameshiwari	5	3:00	
Wins the K-1 Illusion 1993 Karate World Cup.
1993-10-03	Win	(Japan) Taiei Kin	K-1 Illusion 1993 Karate World Cup semifinals	Osaka, Japan	Decision (unanimous)	3	3:00	
1993-10-02	Win	(Australia) Adam Watt	K-1 Illusion 1993 Karate World Cup quarterfinals	Osaka, Japan	Ex.R decision (unanimous)	4	3:00	
1993-10-02	Win	(United States) Patrick Smith	K-1 Illusion 1993 Karate World Cup 1st round	Osaka, Japan	TKO	1	1:16	
1991-10-10	Loss	(Netherlands) Gerard Gordeau	Karate World Cup '91 - All Japan Karate Championship		Decision (Divided)	3		
1991-06-04	Win	(United States) Willie Williams	USA Oyama Karate Vs. Karate Masamichi		Decision (unanimous)	3		
Legend: Win Loss Draw/No contest Notes

== Filmography ==
=== Films ===
Year	Title	Role	Notes
1996	Ichi, ni no sanshiro	Sanshiro	
2004	Gokudô kôshien		Video release

=== Television ===
Year	Title	Role	Notes
1992	Fatal Fury: Legend of the Hungry Wolf	Joe Higashi (voice)	Animated feature based on the video game
1995	The Kindaichi Case Files		Live-action miniseries based on the manga
1996	Holy Dragon Legend	Raijin	10-episode miniseries
2003	Bakuryū Sentai Abaranger (Episode 33)	Hirurindou, Trinoid #2	

== Bibliography ==
- Satake, Masaaki (1992). 世紀末覇者伝 [The End of the Century] (in Japanese). Japan: JICC Publishing Bureau. ISBN 978-4-79-660546-5.
- Satake, Masaaki (December 4, 2003). まっすぐに蹴る [Kicking Straightly] (Tankōbon) (in Japanese). Chiyoda, Tokyo, Japan: Kadokawa Shoten. ISBN 978-4-04-883858-0.
- Satake, Masaaki (December 1, 2011). 武師道 -士から師へ- [Bushido - From Shishi to Shishi] (in Japanese). Japan: Kadokawa Shoten. ISBN 978-4-04-110034-9.

== See also ==
- List of K-1 events
- List of K-1 champions
- List of male kickboxers
