= W.A.K.O. European Championships 1977 =

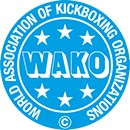
- The poster for W.A.K.O. European Championships 1977
- Promotion: W.A.K.O.
- Date: 1977
- City: Vienna, Austria

Event chronology
| W.A.K.O. European Championships 1977 | W.A.K.O. European Championships 1978 |

W.A.K.O. European Championships 1977 were the first ever W.A.K.O. European kickboxing championships introduced by the pioneer of German Karate Georg Brueckner and the first ever event hosted by the W.A.K.O. organization – then known as the W.M.A.A. (World of Mixed Martial Arts Association) who itself had only just recently been founded in 1976. There had actually been an amateur kickboxing European championships held a year previously but this event was not officially recognized by any federation. The W.A.K.O. championships were open to amateur men based in Europe only and all bouts were fought under Full-Contact kickboxing rules, with each country allowed more than one competitor in each weight category. By the end of the championships the Netherlands were the most successful nation, with West Germany second, and Norway a distant third - more detail on the winners and medal tables can be found in the sections below. The event was held in 1977 in Vienna, Austria.

== Men's Full-Contact Kickboxing ==
The first European championships were sparse when compared with the present day version, hosting only one style – Full-Contact kickboxing – for men only. In terms of weight categories there were seven weight divisions ranging from 57 kg/125.4 lbs to over 84 kg/+184.8 lbs. More detail on Full-Contact's rules-set can be found at the W.A.K.O. website, although be aware that the rules have changed since 1977. The medal winners of each division are shown below.

=== Men's Full-Contact Kickboxing Medals Table ===
| Event | Gold | Silver | Bronze |
|---|---|---|---|
| -57 kg | Max Mankowitz (Norway) | Ali Pehlivan (West Germany) | Jérome Canabate (Switzerland) |
| -63 kg | Hansi Jaensch (West Germany) | Martin Giesselmann (West Germany) | Ivan Menes (Netherlands) |
| -69 kg | Ron Kuyt (Netherlands) | Kemal Zeriat (West Germany) | Jorg Schmidt (West Germany) |
| -74 kg | Peter Harbrecht (West Germany) | Serge Metz (Netherlands) | Aalstede (Netherlands) |
| -79 kg | H. Rompa (Netherlands) | Bert de Frel (Netherlands) | J. Schepers (Netherlands) |
| -84 kg | Gerad Bakker (Netherlands) | Maurice Moore (West Germany) | Vittorio Caselli (Italy) |
| +84 kg | Jan de Graf (Netherlands) | Kunibert Back (West Germany) | Gianni Rugliancic (Italy) |

== Overall medals standing (top 5) ==
The Netherlands was the most dominant nation at the 1977 W.A.K.O. European Championships picking up four gold, two silver and three bronze medals.

| Ranking | Country | Gold (gold) | Silver (silver) | Bronze (bronze) |
|---|---|---|---|---|
| 1 | Netherlands | 4 | 2 | 3 |
| 2 | West Germany | 2 | 5 | 1 |
| 3 | Norway | 1 | 0 | 0 |
| 4 | Italy | 0 | 0 | 2 |
| 5 | Switzerland | 0 | 0 | 1 |

== See also ==
- List of WAKO Amateur European Championships
- List of WAKO Amateur World Championships
