= W.A.K.O. European Championships 1980 =

Kickboxing event

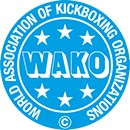
- The poster for W.A.K.O. European Championships 1980
- Promotion: W.A.K.O.
- Date: 1980
- Venue: Wembley Centre
- City: (United Kingdom) London, England, UK

Event chronology
W.A.K.O. World Championships 1979	W.A.K.O. European Championships 1980	W.A.K.O. World Championships 1981

W.A.K.O. European Championships 1980 were the fourth European kickboxing championships hosted by the W.A.K.O. organization. The championships were open to amateur men based in Europe and for the first time ever (in European championships), each country had one competitor only per weight division. The styles on offer were Full-Contact and Semi-Contact. By the end of the championships, West Germany had the largest haul of medals, with host nation Great Britain in second, and Italy in third place. The event was held at the Wembley Centre in London, England, UK.

== Men's Full-Contact Kickboxing ==
The Full-Contact category in London had seven weight divisions ranging from 57 kg/125.4 lbs to over 84 kg/+184.8 lbs, with all bouts fought under Full-Contact rules. More detail on Full-Contact's rules-set can be found at the W.A.K.O. website, although be aware that the rules have changed since 1980. The medal winners of each division are shown below with future K-1 world champion Branko Cikatić winning his second W.A.K.O. European championships, as did West German fighter Klaus Friedhaber. By the end of the championships, West Germany were the strongest nation in Full-Contact with two golds, narrowly fending off hosts Great Britain who won one gold, three silvers and one bronze.

=== Men's Full-Contact Kickboxing Medals Table ===
Event	Gold	Silver	Bronze
-57 kg	Michael Kuhr (West Germany)	Howard Brown (United Kingdom)	Lloyd (Wales)
-63 kg	Klaus Friedhaber (West Germany)	Godfrey Butler (United Kingdom)	Broom (Wales)
-69 kg	Sandry Ravessoud (Switzerland)	Sølv Sunde (Norway)	Van Duin (Netherlands)
-74 kg	Erling Havnå (Norway)	Wilson (United Kingdom)	Ruedisnehli (Switzerland)
-79 kg	Branko Cikatić (Socialist Federal Republic of Yugoslavia)	David (Netherlands)	Dev Barrett (United Kingdom)
-84 kg	Partipilo (Italy)	Spika (Socialist Federal Republic of Yugoslavia)	Heinz Oberhummer (Austria)
+84 kg	Commack (United Kingdom)	Pusnik (Socialist Federal Republic of Yugoslavia)	Harold Ehmann (Austria)

== Men's Semi-Contact Kickboxing ==
The Semi-Contact category differed from Full-Contact in that fights were won on points given to superior skill, speed and technique and physical force was limited - more information on Semi-Contact can be found on the W.A.K.O. website, although the rules will have changed since 1980. There were seven weight divisions in Semi-Contact in London, ranging from 57 kg/125.4 lbs to over 84 kg/+184.8 lbs. By the end of the championships, West Germany were the most successful nation in Semi-Contact, winning three gold medals and two bronze.

=== Men's Semi-Contact Kickboxing Medals Table ===
Event	Gold	Silver	Bronze
-57 kg	Christian Wulf (West Germany)	Alessandro Ortelli (Italy)	Coughlan (United Kingdom)
-63 kg	Patrick Scantlebury (United Kingdom)	Kessels (Belgium)	Gerathy (Republic of Ireland)
-69 kg	Andreas Brannasch (West Germany)	Prelog (Austria)	De Koning (Netherlands)
-74 kg	Federico Milani (Italy)	Kropf (Switzerland)	De Koning (Netherlands)
-79 kg	Ivan Wray (United Kingdom)	Maurizio Facchinetti (Italy)	Ludger Dietz (West Germany)
-84 kg	Harald Edel (West Germany)	Streicher (Austria)	Walter Meneghini (Italy)
+84 kg	Ansberger (Austria)	Urich Falk (Switzerland)	Rudiger Malzahn (West Germany)

== Overall Medals Standing (Top 5) ==
Ranking	Country	Gold (gold)	Silver (silver)	Bronze (bronze)
1	West Germany	5	0	2
2	(United Kingdom) Great Britain	3	3	2
3	Italy	2	2	1
4	Austria	1	2	1
4	Switzerland	1	2	1
5	(Socialist Federal Republic of Yugoslavia) Yugoslavia	1	2	0

== See also ==
- List of WAKO Amateur European Championships
- List of WAKO Amateur World Championships
