= W.A.K.O. European Championships 1978 =

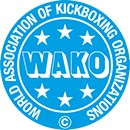
- The poster for W.A.K.O. European Championships 1978
- Promotion: W.A.K.O.
- Date: May 1978
- City: Wolfsburg, West Germany
- Attendance: 8000

Event chronology
W.A.K.O. European Championships 1977	W.A.K.O. European Championships 1978	W.A.K.O. World Championships 1978

W.A.K.O. European Championships 1978 was the second European kickboxing championships hosted by the W.A.K.O. organization and organized by the pioneer of German karate Georg Brueckner. The 1978 W.A.K.O. European championships were open to amateur men based in Europe only, with each country allowed more than one competitor in an individual weight category. The event also heralded a new category, Semi-Contact, which was introduced to feature alongside the existing Full-Contact category. At the championships end, West Germany was by far the most successful nation, with the previous year's top nation, the Netherlands, finishing way behind in second, and Italy came third - more details on the winners and medal tables can be found in the sections below. The event was held in May 1978 in the border town of Wolfsburg, West Germany.

== Men's Full-Contact Kickboxing ==
As with the previous years championships, the 1978 European Championships Full-Contact kickboxing category had seven weight divisions for men only, with all bouts fought under Full-Contact kickboxing rules. More details on Full-Contact's rules-set can be found on the W.A.K.O. website, although be aware that the rules have changed since 1978. The weight divisions on offer ranged from 57 kg/125.4 lbs to over 87 kg/191.4 lbs - with the heaviest division having a slight minimum increase of 3 kg on the 1977 championships. The medal winners of each division are shown below with the host West Germany being by far the most dominant nation in Full-Contact, winning five gold, four silver and two bronze medals.

=== Men's Full-Contact Kickboxing Medals Table ===
Event	Gold	Silver	Bronze
-57 kg	Ali Pehlivan (West Germany)	Constantinos Goris (West Germany)	Jonny Canabate (Switzerland)
-63 kg	Ivan Menes (Netherlands)	Rafik Jamali (West Germany)	Gunter Dienstl (Austria)
-69 kg	Omar Salhi (Norway)	Javier Muniz (Netherlands)	Tone Spiljak (Socialist Federal Republic of Yugoslavia)
-74 kg	Peter Harbrecht (West Germany)	Klaus Lutze (West Germany)	Slobodon Sokota (Socialist Federal Republic of Yugoslavia)
-79 kg	Daryl Tyler (West Germany)	Dieter Herdel (West Germany)	Bernd Eggert (West Germany)
-87 kg	Maurice Moore (West Germany)	Flavio Galessi (Italy)	Gianni Rugliancic (Italy)
+87 kg	Tom Rissmann (West Germany)	Milan Rokvic (Socialist Federal Republic of Yugoslavia)	Manfred Vogt (West Germany)

== Men's Semi-Contact Kickboxing ==
The 1978 European Championships saw the introduction of a second category, Semi-Contact, a form of kickboxing which differed from Full-Contact in that competitors were not allowed to use excessive force and won fights instead by relying on speed, skill and technique to score points - more detail on Semi-Contact rules can be found on the W.A.K.O. website, although be aware that much has changed since 1978. As with Full-Contact there were seven weight divisions at the championships for men only, ranging from 57 kg (125.4 lbs) to over 84 kg (184.8 lbs). The medal winners of each division are shown below with West Germany being the strongest nation in Semi-Contact, winning five gold, three silver and two bronze medals.

=== Men's Semi-Contact Kickboxing Medals Table ===
Event	Gold	Silver	Bronze
-57 kg	Christian Wulf (West Germany)	Sarhan Salman (West Germany)	Dominique Rahm (Switzerland)
-63 kg	J. Rothenbucher (West Germany)	Dennis Wooter (Netherlands)	Johnny Mirer (Switzerland)
-69 kg	Jochen Klapproth (West Germany)	Andreas Brannasch (West Germany)	Carlo Boccolli (Italy)
-74 kg	Jurgen Gorak (West Germany)	H. Hirschganger (West Germany)	Luigi Franchi (Italy)
-79 kg	Alton Davis (Netherlands)	Herbert Schochl (Austria)	Walter Asche (West Germany)
-84 kg	Harald Edel (West Germany)	Aldo Capra (Italy)	Albert Purschl (Austria)
+84 kg	Anne Delis (Netherlands)	Federico Milani (Italy)	Howard Collins (Sweden); Ernest Lee Patton (West Germany)

== Overall Medals Standing (Top 5) ==
Ranking	Country	Gold (gold)	Silver (silver)	Bronze (bronze)
1	West Germany	10	7	4
2	Netherlands	3	2	0
3	Italy	0	3	3
4	Norway	1	0	0
5	(Socialist Federal Republic of Yugoslavia) Yugoslavia	0	1	2

== See also ==
- List of WAKO Amateur European Championships
- List of WAKO Amateur World Championships
