= W.A.K.O. World Championships 1981 =

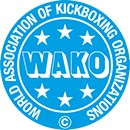
- The poster for W.A.K.O. World Championships 1981
- Promotion: W.A.K.O.
- Date: 1981
- City: Milan, Italy

Event chronology
W.A.K.O. European Championships 1980	W.A.K.O. World Championships 1981	W.A.K.O. European Championships 1981

W.A.K.O. World Championships 1981 were the third world kickboxing championships hosted by W.A.K.O. and were organized by Italian Ennio Falsoni. It was the second time that W.A.K.O. had held a championships in Italy (the Europeans had been held there in 1979) and heralded the beginning of the organizations having its world championships every two years as opposed to once a year. The event was open to amateur men only from across the world, and featured two categories; Semi-Contact kickboxing and the newly introduced Musical Forms, and for the first time ever there was no Full-Contact kickboxing. By the end of the championships, West Germany were the top nation, with the USA in second and host nation Italy in third. The event was held in Milan, Italy in 1981.

== Men's Semi-Contact Kickboxing ==
Semi-Contact, now established by W.A.K.O. in all its major events, was the only form of kickboxing on offer at the Milan world championships. The rules for Semi-Contact differed from Full-Contact in that there was less physical contact and force used and points were awarded on a basis of skill, technique and speed – a more detailed version of Semi-Contact rules can be found on the official W.A.K.O. website, although be aware that the rules have changed since 1981. As with previous events there was seven weight divisions, ranging from 57 kg/125.4 lbs to over 84 kg/+184.8 lbs. The medal winners of each division are shown below with West Germany being the top nation in Semi-Contact by the end of the championship, with a haul of five gold medals and one silver.

=== Men's Semi-Contact Kickboxing Medals Table ===
Event	Gold	Silver	Bronze
-57 kg	Ranier Knell (West Germany)	Giuliano Sartoni (San Marino)	Peter Muller (Austria)
-63 kg	Ulf Schmidt (West Germany)	Tommy Williams (United States)	David Sirota (Austria)
-69 kg	Fritz Bissot (West Germany)	Daniel Humbel (Switzerland)	John Chung (United States)
-74 kg	Hans Gerd Hinz (West Germany)	Leonardo Pavoni (Italy)	Billy Jackson (United States)
-79 kg	Ray McCallum (United States)	Ludger Dietze (West Germany)	Federico Milani (Italy)
-84 kg	Harald Edel (West Germany)	Walter Meneghini (Italy)	Slobodon Sokota (Socialist Federal Republic of Yugoslavia)
+84 kg	Daryl Tyler (United States)	A. Miller (Canada)	T. Volken (Switzerland)

== Men's Musical Forms ==
The world championships in Milan saw the introduction of Musical Forms. Musical Forms is a non-physical competition which sees the contestants fighting against imaginary foes using Martial Arts techniques. Unlike the Semi-Contact category there were no weight classes, and an individual country was allowed more than one competitor to represent it. By the end of the championships all three medal positions were taken by American contestants but as the Musical Forms winners were not officially recognized by W.A.K.O. their medals would not contribute to the overall medals tally for countries. More information on Musical Forms can be accessed on the W.A.K.O. website, although be aware that the rules will have changed since 1981.

=== Men's Musical Forms Medals Table ===
Event	Gold	Silver	Bronze
Men's Musical Forms	John Chung (United States)	Ric Pascetta (United States)	Daryl Tyler (United States)

== Overall Medals Standing (Top 5) ==
Ranking	Country	Gold (gold)	Silver (silver)	Bronze (bronze)
1	West Germany	5	1	0
2	(United States) USA	2	1	2
3	Italy	0	2	1
4	Switzerland	0	1	1
5	Canada	0	1	0
5	San Marino	0	1	0

== See also ==
- List of WAKO Amateur World Championships
- List of WAKO Amateur European Championships
