= Maurice Smith (fighter) =

American kickboxer and mixed martial arts fighter

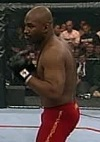
- Smith in 1999
- Born: December 13, 1961 (age 64); Seattle, Washington, U.S.
- Other names: Mo
- Height: 6 ft 2 in (188 cm)
- Weight: 206 lb (93 kg; 14 st 10 lb)
- Division: Heavyweight (1993-2008, 2013); Light Heavyweight (2012)
- Style: Kickboxing
- Team: The Alliance
- Years active: 1980–2008, 2012–2013

Professional boxing record
- Total: 2
- Losses: 2
- By knockout: 2

Kickboxing record
- Total: 71
- Wins: 53
- Losses: 13
- Draws: 5

Mixed martial arts record
- Total: 27
- Wins: 13
- By knockout: 8
- By submission: 2
- By decision: 3
- Losses: 14
- By submission: 10
- By decision: 4

Other information
- Boxing record from BoxRec
- Mixed martial arts record from Sherdog
- Last updated on: May 24, 2013

Maurice Smith (born December 13, 1961) is a retired American kickboxer and mixed martial artist. In kickboxing, he held the WKC (World Kickboxing Council) world light heavyweight championship, the WKA (World Kickboxing Association) world heavyweight championship, and the ISKA (International Sport Karate Association) world heavyweight championship, and participant in the inaugural 1993 K-1 World Grand Prix. In mixed martial arts, he held the Heavyweight championship in Battlecade Extreme Fighting and the UFC, and became a member of the UFC Hall of Fame in 2017. Smith has also competed in shoot-style professional wrestling in Japan for the Universal Wrestling Federation and Pro Wrestling Fujiwara Gumi, where he was pitted against prominent pro wrestlers in interstyle "pro wrestling vs. kickboxing" matches.

A professional competitor since 1980, Smith has formerly competed in kickboxing for the companies All Japan Enterprise and K-1, and in MMA for Pancrase, UFC, Fighting Network RINGS, PRIDE, Strikeforce, International Fight League and RFA.

== Career ==
Raised in Seattle, Washington, Smith got into martial arts at the age of 11 after watching Bruce Lee's Chinese Connection, and having had to retreat from a fight. He trained in karate, kung fu, and taekwondo, until he found the sport of kickboxing at age 18. Smith attended West Seattle High School, where he played football and participated in gymnastics.

=== Kickboxing career ===
Smith won his first seven amateur kickboxing matches and then turned professional. His first fight was on March 4, 1982 against World Kickboxing Council's Light Heavyweight Champion Tony Morelli, who defeated him by decision after the seventh round. Seeing he had lost due to his lack of cardio, Smith started to train extensively to improve it, and fourteen months later, he went to his rematch as a new fighter. He then defeated Morelli by KO via roundhouse kick also in the seventh round, winning the championship.

Later that year, he was called for a non-title fight in Japan against the renowned Don "The Dragon" Wilson, and although Smith lost the fight, he had shown heads in the kickboxing world that he was on the way up. Maurice moved up a weight class and won the World Kickboxing Association Heavyweight Championship from Travis Everett, knocking him out via low kicks in 1983.

In 1984, Smith went to compete in Holland, beating Marcel Swank in the first round.

Smith went ten straight years without a loss, defended the WKA title against Kevin Rosier, Steve Tremblay, Raymond Homsey, Dino Homsey and Bill Morrison (kickboxer). was ranked number one in the world in full contact kickboxing by ISKA in 1987.

He also had a notable win in 1991 over Stan Longinidis who, at the time, was tearing through the ranks and was regarded as a super up and coming fighter. Maurice won this 12 round match by split decision after coming back from a knockdown in the first round by Stan and surviving an early onslaught.

In 1993, Smith was invited to the K-1 Grand Prix '93, the first ever of the famed K-1 World Grand Prix, along with seven of the world's best Light Heavyweight and Heavyweight kickboxers. Smith won his first match by defeating Japanese fighter Toshiyuki Atokawa in the quarterfinals by unanimous decision. In the semifinals he met Dutch fighter and future K-1 legend, Ernesto Hoost, where after a hard-fought battle Smith was knocked out by left highkick in the final round, ending his tournament.

=== Professional Wrestling career ===
Smith had his first contact with mixed rules of fight, when he was invited in November 1989 by the Japanese professional wrestling promotion UWF Newborn. The UWF was a pioneering shoot-style wrestling promotion that presented realistic, combat-oriented matches, while the outcomes and storylines were predetermined. The event was U-COSMOS, where UWF wrestlers would face challengers of other martial arts and combat sports. He was scheduled to face up-and-coming wrestler Masakatsu Funaki in a mixed rules fight at, but his opponent got injured and was replaced with training partner Minoru Suzuki. During the fight, Smith kept negating Suzuki's takedown attempts by employing the pro wrestling-ruled rope scapes and a rudimentary sprawl ability, knocking him out several times with strike before finishing him with a right punch at the fourth round. The event sold out the Tokyo Dome and broke record gates.

On October 4, 1992, Smith would face Funaki in an exhibition fight for Pro Wrestling Fujiwara Gumi, ending in a draw.

=== Mixed martial arts career ===
In 1993, Smith debuted for the mixed martial arts promotion Pancrase founded by Funaki and Suzuki. Here, despite using the shoot wrestling ruleset, the fights were legitimate competitive bouts rather than predetermined matches. He took part in a kickboxing rules fight against Suzuki in the event Yes, We Are Hybrid Wrestlers 3. Later, he was scheduled to compete in a special rules MMA fight, in which the first and third rounds would be fought wearing boxing gloves, the second and fourth barehanded, and the fifth with only Smith wearing them. However, Smith lost the fight when Suzuki took him down at round 3 and made him tap to an armbar.

The next year, he took part in the King of Pancrase tournament. Maurice beat Takaku Fuke on the first round but fell to Ken Shamrock via arm triangle choke. He would go to lose twice to Bas Rutten, however his loss to Shamrock was more instrumental to his career, as he became friends with him and was sent to his dojo in United States, the Lion's Den, to learn proper MMA. There he met Frank Shamrock, who he formed a close relationship with. Shamrock and Smith worked synergistically; Shamrock, a submission specialist, improved Smith's ground game, while Smith in return improved Shamrock's striking. Along with Japanese fighter Tsuyoshi Kohsaka, who had befriended Frank after a fight between them in Fighting Network RINGS, Smith and Shamrock eventually formed their own MMA team, called the Alliance.

Smith joined Battlecade Extreme Fighting in 1996 to fight against the Heavyweight Champion Marcus "Conan" Silveira. Throughout the fight, Maurice showed excellent use of the sprawl technique which negated the Brazilian jiu-jitsu fighter's attempts at takedowns, as well as a remarkable submission defensive whenever Silveira was able to engage him on the ground. Smith then knocked out Silveira in the third round with a roundhouse kick to the head. In doing so, he became the Extreme Fighting Heavyweight Champion and became the first legitimate striker to win a top-end MMA event.

He then defended his title in the fourth show against judo and pro wrestling exponent Kazunari Murakami. Although Murakami surprisingly dropped Smith with a palm strike at the beginning, Smith escaped from his ground game and hit a barrage of leg kicks against the prone Japanese, and later knocked him out with a single punch. After the win, the company folded and Maurice joined the largest MMA promotion in the United States, the UFC.

At UFC 14 on July 27, 1997, Smith faced UFC Heavyweight Champion Mark Coleman in a title fight. Smith was considered to be a massive underdog for the bout, but shocked the mixed martial arts world with a unanimous decision victory to win the UFC Heavyweight Championship. With this win, Smith became the first striker to survive the attack of a world class wrestler. Through the use of an active guard, Smith was able to negate Coleman's vaunted ground and pound attacks. After nearly 15 minutes of attempting to damage Smith through his guard, Coleman was exhausted, allowing Smith to capitalize on the feet. Eventually, he won the decision against an exhausted and damaged Coleman.

Smith then successfully defended his belt against David "Tank" Abbott winning after Abbott was too exhausted to continue, before losing his belt to MMA legend Randy Couture by majority decision, in a controversial fight that many viewers deemed as a fight that Smith should have won; especially since Smith was the reigning and defending UFC heavyweight champion.

==== Return to MMA ====
On May 19, 2007 Maurice Smith had his first MMA bout in almost seven years when he defeated Marco Ruas by TKO in a rematch at an International Fight League show held in Chicago. He saved his energy for the first rounds, making little action, before turning to attack and dropping Ruas thrice with striking combinations for the towel throw.

On February 23, 2008 at a Strikeforce event entitled Strikeforce: At The Dome held at the Tacoma Dome in Tacoma, Washington, Smith defeated kickboxer Rick Roufus, who was making his MMA debut, by submission at 1:53 of the first round.

Maurice Smith was the coach of the Seattle Tiger Sharks of the International Fight League from 2006 to 2007. He is currently associated with Team Alliance.

Smith returned to MMA on March 30, 2012 at the second Resurrection Fighting Alliance (RFA) card against Jorge Cordoba, his first career fight as a Light Heavyweight. After spending the first two rounds picking apart Cordoba with various strikes, Maurice finished the fight with a head-kick knockout. He was scheduled to fight Ryan Lopez on June 30, 2012 at Resurrection Fighting Alliance's third event, RFA 3. Weeks before the fight, though, Lopez was forced to pull out of the fight due to an unspecified illness.

Smith returned to the Heavyweight division and lost a unanimous decision to Matt Kovacs at Cage Warrior Combat (CWC) 9 on November 2, 2013.

== Championships and accomplishments ==
=== Kickboxing ===
- K-1
  - 2001 K-1 World Grand Prix Preliminary USA winner
  - K-1 World Grand Prix '93 Tournament Semifinalist
- International Sport Karate Association
  - I.S.K.A. World Muay Thai Heavyweight Champion (1996)
- World Kickboxing Association
  - W.K.A. World Kickboxing Heavyweight Champion (1983)
  - W.K.A. World Muay Thai Heavyweight Champion (1994)
- Other
  - W.K.C. Light-Heavyweight World Champion (1983)

=== Mixed martial arts ===
- Ultimate Fighting Championship
  - UFC Hall of Fame (Pioneer wing, Class of 2017)
  - UFC Heavyweight Championship (One time)
  - One successful title defense
  - UFC Encyclopedia Awards
    - Fight of the Night (One time) vs. Mark Coleman
- Extreme Fighting
  - Extreme Fighting Heavyweight Championship 3 Marcus "Conan" Silveira
  - Extreme Fighting Heavyweight Championship 4 Murakami Kazanari
- Wrestling Observer Newsletter
  - 1997 Most Outstanding Fighter
  - 1997 Fight of the Year vs. Mark Coleman on July 27
- Black Belt Magazine
  - 2001 Full-Contact Fighter of the Year

== Kickboxing record ==
Kickboxing record
53 Wins, 13 Losses, 5 Draws
Date	Result	Opponent	Event	Location	Method	Round	Time	Record
2005-11-07	Loss	(Australia) Chris Chrisopoulides	No Respect 3	Melbourne, Australia	Decision	3	3:00	
2003-05-02	Loss	(United States) Rick Roufus	K-1 World Grand Prix 2003 in Las Vegas Semi Finals	Las Vegas, Nevada, United States	Decision (Unanimous)	3	3:00	
2003-05-02	Win	(Canada) Giuseppe DeNatale	K-1 World Grand Prix 2003 in Las Vegas Quarter Finals	Las Vegas, Nevada, United States	Decision (Unanimous)	3	3:00	
2003-04-06	Win	(Japan) Tsuyoshi	K-1 Beast 2003	Yamagata, Yamagata, Japan	Decision (Majority)	3	3:00	
2001-08-11	Loss	(Netherlands) Peter Aerts	K-1 World Grand Prix 2001 in Las Vegas Semi Finals	Las Vegas, Nevada, United States	Ext.R Decision (Unanimous)	4	3:00	
2001-08-11	Win	(Sweden) Jörgen Kruth	K-1 World Grand Prix 2001 in Las Vegas Quarter Finals	Las Vegas, Nevada, USA	Decision (Unanimous)	3	3:00	
2001-05-05	Win	(Canada) Michael McDonald	K-1 World Grand Prix 2001 Preliminary USA Final	Las Vegas, Nevada, United States	Ext.R Decision (Split)	4	3:00	
Wins K-1 World Grand Prix 2001 Preliminary USA and qualifies for K-1 World Grand Prix 2001 in Las Vegas.
2001-05-05	Win	(Austria) Gunter Singer	K-1 World Grand Prix 2001 Preliminary USA Semi Finals	Las Vegas, Nevada, United States	KO (Right punch)	2	0:24	
2001-05-05	Win	(Mexico) Pedro Fernandez	K-1 World Grand Prix 2001 Preliminary USA Quarter Finals	Las Vegas, Nevada, United States	Decision (Unanimous)	3	3:00	
1999-08-22	Loss	(Switzerland) Andy Hug	K-1 Spirits '99	Tokyo, Japan	Decision (Unanimous)	5	3:00	
1999-06-06	Loss	(Netherlands) Peter Aerts	K-1 Survival '99	Sapporo, Japan	TKO (Corner stoppage)	3	2:44	
1998-09-27	Loss	(South Africa) Mike Bernardo	K-1 World Grand Prix '98 opening round	Osaka, Japan	Decision (Unanimous)	5	3:00	
Fails to qualify for K-1 Grand Prix '98 Final Round.
1998-08-07	Loss	(Netherlands) Ernesto Hoost	K-1 USA Grand Prix '98	Las Vegas, Nevada, United States	Decision (Unanimous)	5	3:00	
1998-05-24	Draw	(United States) Jean-Claude Leuyer	Draka V	Los Angeles, California, United States	Decision Draw			
Fight was for Draka World Super Heavyweight title.
1998-04-09	Draw	(Japan) Masaaki Satake	K-1 Kings '98	Yokohama, Japan	Decision Draw	5	3:00	
1997-02-01	Loss	(France) Jérôme Le Banner	Le Choc des Champions	Paris, France	Decision	5	3:00	
Fight was for Le Banner's ISKA Full-contact World Super Heavyweight title.
1995-09-01	Win	(Japan) Manabu Yamada	Pancrase: 1995 Anniversary Show	Tokyo, Japan	KO (Punch)	2	1:46	
1994-07-30	Win	(Netherlands) Frank Lobman	AJKF Destiny VII	Nagoya, Japan	KO (Left high kick)	3		
Wins the WKA World Heavyweight Muay Thai title.
1993-12-04	Win	(Venezuela) Alex Desir		Las Vegas, Nevada, United States	KO (Punch)	10		
Retains WKA Heavyweight World title.
1993-11-08	Win	(Japan) Minoru Suzuki	Pancrase: Yes, We Are Hybrid Wrestlers 3	Kobe, Japan	KO (Right hook)	3	0:52	
1993-04-30	Loss	(Netherlands) Ernesto Hoost	K-1 Grand Prix '93 Semi Finals	Tokyo, Japan	KO (Left high kick)	3	1:18	
1993-04-30	Win	(Japan) Toshiyuki Atokawa	K-1 Grand Prix '93 Quarter Finals	Tokyo, Japan	Decision (Unanimous)	3	3:00	
1993-03-27	Win	(Germany) Marcus Fuckner	All Japan Kickboxing Federation	Tokyo, Japan	KO	5		
1993-03-07	Loss	(Netherlands) Peter Aerts	The Night of the Shock	Amsterdam, Netherlands	KO (Right high kick)	4	2:07	
1992-04-09	Loss	(Netherlands) Peter Aerts		Paris, France	Decision	9	2:00	
1992-03-16	Win	(United States) Steven Kruwell	World Martial Arts Challenge	Las Vegas, Nevada, United States	TKO (Low kicks)	2	1:41	
Fight was an elimination fight for the WMAC Heavyweight World title held by Dennis Alexio. Despite talks Smith and Alexio would never meet in the ring.
1991	Win	(Australia) Stan Longinidis		Sydney, Australia	Decision (Split)	12	2:00	
Retains WKA Heavyweight World title.
1991-06-29	Win	(Netherlands) Andre Mannaart	Thriller from Paris I	Paris, France	KO	2		
1991-05-26	Win	(Netherlands) Peter Smit	"Soar Into Space" Chapter III	Tokyo, Japan	KO	5	1:13	38-3-3
1991-03-30	Win	(Netherlands) Kees Bessems	"Soar Into Space" Chapter II	Tokyo, Japan	KO	1		
1990-12-09	Win	(Netherlands) Kees Bessems	Sammi Kebchi Promotion	France, Paris	KO	2		
1990-09-09	Win	(England) Floyd Brown	"Inspiring Wars Heat-928"	Tokyo, Japan	Decision (Unanimous)	5	3:00	
1990-01-20	Win	(United States) Kevin Rosier	"Inspiring Wars" 1	Tokyo, Japan	KO	2		33-3-3
Retains WKA Heavyweight World title.
1987-09-05	Win	(Canada) Steve Tremblay	All Japan Kickboxing Federation "Super Fight 2"	Tokyo, Japan	KO	5		
Retains WKA Heavyweight World title.
1987	Win	(United States) Dino Homsey						
Retains WKA Heavyweight World title.
1987	Win	(United States) Bill Morrison (kickboxer)		Las Vegas, Nevada, United States	TKO (Low kicks)	8	0:55	
Retains WKA Heavyweight World title.
1986	Win	(United States) Raymond Horsey		Atlanta, Georgia, USA	KO (Low Kicks)			
Retains WKA Heavyweight World title.
1984	Win	(Netherlands) Marcel Schwank		Netherlands	KO	1		
1983	Win	(Australia) Dana Goodson						
Retains WKA Heavyweight World title.
1983	Win	(United States) Travis Everett		Mexico City, Mexico	KO (Low Kicks)			13-2
Wins WKA Heavyweight World title.
1983	Win							12-2
1983-05-21	Loss	(United States) Don Wilson		Tokyo, Japan	Decision	11	2:00	11-2
Fight was for vacant WKA Cruiserweight World title.
1983-00-00	Win	(United States) Bob Smith					11-1	
1983-00-00	Win	(United States) Tony Morelli		Hawaii, United States	KO (Kick)	7		10-1
Wins WKC Light Heavyweight World title.
1983-00-00	Win	(United States) Don Nakaya Nielsen		Las Vegas, Nevada, United States	Decision	7	2:00	9-1
1983-00-00	Loss	(Canada) Tony Morelli		Surrey, Canada	Decision	7	2:00	8-1
Makes professional kickboxing debut.
1981-00-00	Win	(United States) Marcus Ector		Everett, WASHINGTON	KO			7-0
1981-00-00	Win	(Canada) Pat Peters		Surrey, Canada	KO			6-0
1981-00-00	Win	(United States) Scott Rohr		Portland, OR	KO			5-0
1981-00-00	Win	(United States) Ken Orr		Everett, WASHINGTON	KO			4-0
1981-02-26	Win	(United States) Milt Bennett		Everett, Washington	Decision			3-0
1981-01-17	Win	(United States) Rich Mason		Everett, WASHINGTON	KO			2-0
1980-09-20	Win	(United States) Kelly Worden		Tacoma, WASHINGTON	KO			1-0
Legend: Win Loss Draw/No contest Notes

== Professional boxing record ==
No.	Result	Record	Opponent	Type	Round, time	Date	Location	Notes
01	Loss	0–1	James Broad	TKO	4	May 10, 1991	Vancouver, British Columbia, Canada	
02	Loss	0-2	Ken Merritt	TKO	2	July 11, 1992	Murray, Kentucky, U.S.	

== Mixed martial arts record ==
Professional record breakdown
27 matches	13 wins	14 losses
By knockout	8	0
By submission	2	10
By decision	3	4

Res.	Record	Opponent	Method	Event	Date	Round	Time	Location	Notes
Loss	13–14	Matt Kovacs	Decision (unanimous)	CWC 9: Cage Warrior Combat 9	November 2, 2013	3	5:00	Kent, Washington, United States	Return to Heavyweight.
Win	13–13	Jorge Cordoba	KO (head kick)	RFA 2: Yvel vs. Alexander	March 30, 2012	3	2:05	Kearney, Nebraska, United States	Light Heavyweight debut.
Loss	12–13	Hidehiko Yoshida	Submission (neck crank)	World Victory Road Presents: Sengoku 3	June 8, 2008	1	2:23	Saitama, Japan	
Win	12–12	Rick Roufus	Submission (straight armbar)	Strikeforce: At The Dome	February 23, 2008	1	1:53	Tacoma, Washington, United States	
Win	11–12	Marco Ruas	TKO (corner stoppage)	IFL: Chicago	May 19, 2007	4	3:43	Chicago, Illinois, United States	
Loss	10–12	Renato Sobral	Decision (unanimous)	UFC 28	November 17, 2000	3	5:00	Atlantic City, New Jersey, United States	
Win	10–11	Bobby Hoffman	Decision (majority)	UFC 27	September 22, 2000	3	5:00	New Orleans, Louisiana, United States	
Loss	9–11	Renzo Gracie	Submission (straight armbar)	RINGS: King of Kings 1999 Block B	December 22, 1999	1	0:50	Tokyo, Japan	
Win	9–10	Branden Lee Hinkle	Decision (majority)	RINGS: King of Kings 1999 Block B	December 22, 1999	2	5:00	Tokyo, Japan	
Loss	8–10	Marcus Silveira	Submission (arm-triangle choke)	WEF 7: Stomp in the Swamp	October 9, 1999	2	2:48	Kenner, Louisiana, United States	
Win	8–9	Branko Cikatic	Submission (forearm choke)	Pride 7	September 12, 1999	1	7:33	Yokohama, Japan	
Win	7–9	Marco Ruas	TKO (corner stoppage)	UFC 21	July 16, 1999	1	5:00	Cedar Rapids, Iowa, United States	
Loss	6–9	Kevin Randleman	Decision (unanimous)	UFC 19	March 5, 1999	1	15:00	Bay St. Louis, Mississippi, United States	Road to the Heavyweight Title Tournament Semifinals.
Loss	6–8	Randy Couture	Decision (majority)	UFC Japan	December 21, 1997	1	21:00	Yokohama, Japan	Lost the UFC Heavyweight Championship.
Win	6–7	Tank Abbott	TKO (leg kicks)	UFC 15	October 17, 1997	1	8:08	Bay St. Louis, Mississippi, United States	Defended the UFC Heavyweight Championship.
Win	5–7	Mark Coleman	Decision (unanimous)	UFC 14	July 27, 1997	1	21:00	Birmingham, Alabama, United States	Won the UFC Heavyweight Championship. Fight of the Year (1997).
Win	4–7	Kazunari Murakami	KO (punch)	Extreme Fighting 4	March 28, 1997	1	4:23	Des Moines, Iowa, United States	Defended the Extreme Fighting Heavyweight Championship.
Loss	3–7	Akira Maeda	Submission	RINGS: Budokan Hall 1997	January 22, 1997	1	5:35	Tokyo, Japan	
Win	3–6	Marcus Silveira	TKO (head kick)	Extreme Fighting 3	October 18, 1996	3	1:36	Tulsa, Oklahoma, United States	Won the Extreme Fighting Heavyweight Championship.
Loss	2–6	Kiyoshi Tamura	Submission (armbar)	RINGS: Maelstrom 6	August 24, 1996	1	10:58	Tokyo, Japan	
Loss	2–5	Tsuyoshi Kohsaka	Submission (heel hook)	RINGS: Budokan Hall 1996	January 24, 1996	1	2:28	Tokyo, Japan	
Loss	2–4	Bas Rutten	Submission (rear-naked choke)	Pancrase: Eyes Of Beast 6	November 4, 1995	1	4:34	Yokohama, Japan	
Loss	2–3	Bas Rutten	Submission (kneebar)	Pancrase: Eyes Of Beast 4	May 13, 1995	1	2:10	Chiba, Japan	
Loss	2–2	Ken Shamrock	Submission (arm-triangle choke)	Pancrase: King of Pancrase Tournament	December 16, 1994	1	4:23	Tokyo, Japan	Quarterfinals
Win	2–1	Takaku Fuke	KO (knee)	Pancrase: King of Pancrase Tournament	December 16, 1994	1	2:48	Tokyo, Japan	Opening round
Loss	1–1	Minoru Suzuki	Submission (armbar)	Pancrase: Road to the Championship 1	May 31, 1994	3	0:36	Tokyo, Japan	
Win	1–0	Minoru Suzuki	KO (punch)	UWF U-Cosmos	November 29, 1989	4	1:05	Tokyo, Japan	

Preceded by Mark Coleman	2nd UFC Heavyweight Champion; July 27, 1997 – December 21, 1997	Succeeded by Randy Couture
