= Curtis Schuster =

- Born: Curtis G. Schuster; December 9, 1968 (age 57); Bellevue, Washington, United States
- Other names: The Battle Cat
- Nationality: (United States) American
- Height: 1.82 m (5 ft 11 1/2 in)
- Weight: 104.0 kg (229.3 lb; 16.38 st)
- Division: Heavyweight
- Style: Kickboxing, Muay Thai
- Stance: Orthodox
- Fighting out of: Kirkland, Washington, United States
- Team: AMC Kickboxing & Pankration
- Years active: 1994-1998

Kickboxing record
- Total: 28
- Wins: 25
- By knockout: 23
- Losses: 3
- Draws: 0

Curtis Schuster (born December 9, 1968) is a former American Thai boxer. He was a two-time world champion in kickboxing and Muay Thai. Schuster's last fight was in 1998 at the K-1 World GP 1998 in Las Vegas.

== Career ==
Schuster built up a record of 13-0 with 13 knockouts. He won the ISKA Super-Heavyweight Muay Thai World title on January 27, 1995, when he knocked out Wade Irwin in the third round. Schuster defended the title five times, with knockout wins over Lee Hasdell, Valeri Savchenko, Kenny Gale, Branko Pavlovic and a decision victory over Jeff Roufus.

Schuster lost the title to Jerome LeBanner on June 1, 1996. LeBanner won the fight by decision after 5 rounds.

Schuster bounced back with two knockout wins over Stephane Reveillon before winning the ISKA Super Heavyweight Kickboxing World title against Rani Berbachi on May 31, 1997 by KO.

=== K-1 ===
Schuster made his K-1 debut on September 7, 1997 at K-1 Grand Prix 97' Eliminations in Osaka, Japan, where he defeated Sadau Kitsiongrit by decision. He later faced Andy Hug on April 9, 1998 at K-1 Kings 98 in Yokohama, Japan but lost by Decision.

On August 7, 1998, Schuster participated in the first-ever K-1 event in the United States at K-1 USA Grand Prix 1998. In his first two bouts, he defeated Jean Riviere and Jean Claude Leuyer by KO. In the final, Schuster was due to face unbeaten Rick Roufus but withdrew due to injury. Roufus was therefore declared the first ever K-1 USA Winner.

== Career Titles ==
- ISKA Super-Heavyweight Muay Thai World Champion (January 27, 1995- June 1, 1996) 5 Defences.
- ISKA Super Heavyweight Kickboxing World Champion (May 31, 1997 – 1997)

== Kickboxing record ==
Kickboxing record
25 Wins (23 (T)KO's, 2 decisions), 3 Losses
Date	Result	Opponent	Event	Location	Method	Round	Time
1998-08-07	Loss	(United States) Rick Roufus	K-1 USA Grand Prix '98 Final	Las Vegas, Nevada, USA	Gave Up (Unable to fight)		
Fight was for K-1 USA Grand Prix '98 title.
1998-08-07	Win	(United States) Jean-Claude Leuyer	K-1 USA Grand Prix '98 Semi-final	Las Vegas, Nevada, USA	KO (right hand)	2	2:29
1998-08-07	Win	(Canada) Jean Riviere	K-1 USA Grand Prix '98 Quarter-final	Las Vegas, Nevada, United States	KO (left knee)	2	2:52
1998-04-09	Loss	(Switzerland) Andy Hug	K-1 Kings '98	Yokohama, Japan	Decision (unanimous)	5	3:00
1997-09-07	Win	(Thailand) Sadau Kiatsongrit	K-1 World GP 1997 Opening	Osaka, Japan	Decision (2-0)	3	3:00
1997-05-31	Win	(France) Rani Berbachi	Strikeforce World Martial Arts	San Jose, California	KO (low kicks)	2	
Wins I.S.K.A. Oriental Rules World Super Heavyweight title.
1997-02-01	Win	(France) Stéphane Réveillon	Kickboxing Gala	Marseille, France	KO (left hook)	2	
1996-11-??	Win	(France) Stéphane Réveillon	Kickboxing Gala	Paris, France	KO (low kicks)	2	
1996-06-01	Loss	(France) Jérôme Le Banner	Le Choc des Champions	Paris, France	Decision	5	3:00
Loss I.S.K.A. Muaythai World Super Heavyweight title.
1995-11-17	Win	(United States) Duke Roufus	La Nuit Des Champions II	Marseille, France	Decision	5	3:00
Retains I.S.K.A. Muaythai World Super Heavyweight title.
1995-08-26	Win	(Russia) Branko Pavlovic	Kickboxing Mania V	Reno, Nevada	KO (hand foot combination)	2	
Retains I.S.K.A. Muaythai World Super Heavyweight title.
1995-06-??	Win	(England) Kenny Gale	Muaythai Gala	France	KO (left hook)	2	
Retains I.S.K.A. Muaythai World Super Heavyweight title.
1995-05-17	Win	(Russia) Valeri Savchenko	Kickboxing Mania	San Jose, California	KO (straight left)	1	
Retains I.S.K.A. Muaythai World Super Heavyweight title.
1995-04-15	Win	(England) Lee Hasdell	Gala de Levallois-Perret	Paris, France	KO (right knee)	1	
Retains I.S.K.A. Muaythai World Super Heavyweight title.
1995-01-27	Win	(Canada) Wade Irwin	Santa Cruz Civic Auditorium	Santa Cruz, California	KO (overhand right)	3	
Wins vacant I.S.K.A. Muaythai World Super Heavyweight title.
1994-07-30	Win	(Japan) Riki Oh	Destiny VII	Nagoya, Japan	KO (right high kick)	3	
Legend: Win Loss Draw/No contest Notes
