= K-1 Grand Prix '93 =

K-1 martial arts event in 1993

- Promotion: K-1
- Date: April 30, 1993
- Venue: Yoyogi National Gymnasium
- City: Tokyo, Japan
- Attendance: 12,000

Event chronology
K-1 Sanctuary I	K-1 Grand Prix '93	K-1 Sanctuary III

K-1 Grand Prix '93 was a martial arts event held by the K-1 organization on April 30, 1993, at the Yoyogi National Gymnasium in Tokyo, Japan. It was the inaugural K-1 World Grand Prix, featuring an eight-man tournament fought under K-1 rules (3 min. × 3 rounds + 1 extra round). The eight tournament qualifiers were all invited on the basis of their achievements in the kickboxing world (for more information on this see the bulleted list below). As well as tournament matches there was also a full contact karate bout between Andy Hug and Nobuaki Kakuda. The event featured ten fights with fighters representing seven countries. The winner was Branko Cikatić who defeated Ernesto Hoost in the final by first-round knockout, becoming the first K-1 World champion.

Tournament Qualifiers

- Peter Aerts - W.M.T.A. Muay Thai Heavyweight World champion, I.K.B.F. World Heavyweight champion
- Toshiyuki Atokawa - Karate World Cup '91 champion, All Japan Open Karate Championships champion
- Branko Cikatić - I.K.B.F. Kickboxing World Cruiserweight champion, W.K.A. Kickboxing World Cruiserweight champion, Muay Thai World Light Heavyweight Champion
- Todd Hays - US National Kickboxing Heavyweight champion
- Ernesto Hoost - W.K.A. Kickboxing World champion, W.M.T.A. Muay Thai World Light Heavyweight champion, Savate World champion
- Changpuek Kiatsongrit - I.M.T.F Muay Thai World Light Heavyweight champion, W.M.K. World Heavyweight champion
- Masaaki Satake - Karate Japan Open champion
- Maurice Smith - W.K.C. Light-Heavyweight World champion, W.K.A. Kickboxing Heavyweight World champion

== K-1 Grand Prix '93 Tournament ==
Quarter Finals
(United States) Todd Hays
(Japan) Masaaki Satake	KO
(Croatia) Branko Cikatić	KO
(Thailand) Changpuek Kiatsongrit
(Japan) Toshiyuki Atokawa
(United States) Maurice Smith	DEC
(Netherlands) Peter Aerts
(Netherlands) Ernesto Hoost	DEC

Semi Finals
(Japan) Masaaki Satake
(Croatia) Branko Cikatić	KO
(United States) Maurice Smith
(Netherlands) Ernesto Hoost	KO

Final
(Croatia) Branko Cikatić	KO
(Netherlands) Ernesto Hoost

== Results ==
K-1 Grand Prix '93 results
K-1 Grand Prix Quarter Finals: K-1 Rules / 3Min. 3R Ext.1R
(Japan) Masaaki Satake def. Todd Hays (United States)
Satake defeated Hays by KO (Right Low Kicks) at 0:45 of the 2nd Round.
(Croatia) Branko Cikatić def. Changpuek Kiatsongrit (Thailand)
Cikatić defeated Kiatsongrit by KO (Left Hook) at 2:35 of the 1st Round.
(United States) Maurice Smith def. Toshiyuki Atokawa (Japan)
Smith defeated Atokawa by 3rd Round Unanimous Decision 3-0 (30-26, 30-25, 30-27).
(Netherlands) Ernesto Hoost def. Peter Aerts (Netherlands)
Hoost defeated Aerts by 3rd Round Majority Decision 2-0 (29-28, 30-28, 30-30).
Super Fight 1: K-1 Rules / 3Min. 3R Ext.1R
(Japan) Taiei Kin def. Michael Thompson (England)
Kin defeated Thompson by 3rd Round Majority Decision 2-0.
K-1 Grand Prix Semi Finals: K-1 Rules / 3Min. 3R Ext.1R
(Croatia) Branko Cikatić def. Masaaki Satake (Japan)
Cikatić defeated Sataake by KO (Left Hook) at 0:45 of the 3rd Round.
(Netherlands) Ernesto Hoost def. Maurice Smith (United States)
Hoost defeated Smith by KO (Left High Kick) at 1:18 of the 3rd Round.
Super Fight 2: Full Contact Karate Rules / 3Min. 3R Ext.1R
(Switzerland) Andy Hug def. Nobuaki Kakuda (Japan)
Hug defeated Kakuda by KO (Left Knee Strike) at 1:26 of the 2nd Round.
K-1 Grand Prix Final: K-1 Rules / 3Min. 3R Ext.1R
(Croatia) Branko Cikatić def. Ernesto Hoost (Netherlands)
Cikatić defeated Hoost by KO (Right Hook) at 2:49 of the 1st Round.

== See also ==
- List of K-1 events
- K-1 World Grand Prix
- List of K-1 champions
- List of male kickboxers
