= W.A.K.O. European Championships 1979 =

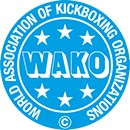
- The poster for W.A.K.O. European Championships 1979
- Promotion: W.A.K.O.
- Date: 1979
- City: Milan, Italy

Event chronology
W.A.K.O. World Championships 1978	W.A.K.O. European Championships 1979	W.A.K.O. World Championships 1979

W.A.K.O. European Championships 1979 was the third European kickboxing championships hosted by the W.A.K.O. organization, organized by the Italian Ennio Falsoni. As with previous European championships the 1979 W.A.K.O. championships were open to amateur men based in Europe only, with each country allowed more than one competitor in an individual weight category. Two styles of kickboxing were on offer – Full-Contact and Semi-Contact. By the championships end West Germany was yet again the strongest nation, with Yugoslavia in second place, and hosts Italy in third - more detail on the winners and medal tables can be found in the sections below. The event was held in 1979 in Milan, Italy.

== Men's Full-Contact Kickboxing ==
At Milan the men's Full-Contact kickboxing category had seven weight divisions ranging from 57 kg/125.4 lbs to over 84 kg/+184.8 lbs, with all bouts fought under Full-Contact rules. More detail on Full-Contact's rules-set can be found at the W.A.K.O. website, although be aware that the rules have changed since 1979. The medal winners of each division are shown below with Peter Harbrecht winning yet another gold and future K-1 world champion Branko Cikatić winning his first major title. Also of interest were Jerome and Jonny Canabate who had won medals at previous W.A.K.O. championships representing Switzerland, but were now picking up medals for the host nation Italy. At the end of the championships West Germany were the strongest nation in the Full-Contact category winning four gold, one silver and one bronze medal.

=== Men's Full-Contact Kickboxing Medals Table ===
Event	Gold	Silver	Bronze
-57 kg	Jerome Canabate (Italy)	Boffa (Switzerland)	Jonny Canabate (Italy)
-63 kg	Klaus Friedhaber (West Germany)	Jimmie Barletta (Belgium)	Jorg Leuk-Emden (West Germany)
-69 kg	Ferdinand Mack (West Germany)	Kemal Zeriat (France)	Colapietro (Belgium)
-74 kg	Peter Harbrecht (West Germany)	Erling Havnå (Norway)	A. Tommei (Switzerland)
-79 kg	Branko Cikatić (Socialist Federal Republic of Yugoslavia)	Jean-Marc Tonus (Switzerland)	Roufs (Netherlands)
-84 kg	Branko Zgaljardic (Socialist Federal Republic of Yugoslavia)	Flavio Galessi (Italy)	Nils Hovelsrud (Norway)
+84 kg	Tom Rissman (West Germany)	Manfred Vogt (West Germany)	Maurizio Rigo (Italy)

== Men's Semi-Contact Kickboxing ==
Absent from the 1978 world championship, Semi-Contact returned to the Milan European championships. Unlike Full-Contact where fighters could be knocked out, Semi-Contact relied on contestants to outscore the other using skill, speed and technique to score points rather than by using excessive force - more detail on Semi-Contact can be found on the W.A.K.O. website, although the rules will have changed somewhat since 1979. As with Full-Contact there were seven weight divisions ranging from 57 kg/125.4 lbs to over 84 kg/+184.8 lbs. The medal winners of each division are shown below with West Germany again being the strongest nation with five gold medals and two silvers won in Semi-Contact by the end of the championships.

=== Men's Semi-Contact Kickboxing Medals Table ===
Event	Gold	Silver	Bronze
-57 kg	Sarhan Salman (West Germany)	Christian Wulf (West Germany)	Manfred Frohwein (Austria)
-63 kg	Dennis Wooter (Netherlands)	Goyvaerts (Belgium)	Antonio Loser (Austria)
-69 kg	Jochen Klapproth (West Germany)	Andreas Brannasch (West Germany)	Maurizio Ronchiato (Italy)
-74 kg	Jurgen Gorak (West Germany)	Slobodon Sokota (Socialist Federal Republic of Yugoslavia)	Wilson (United Kingdom)
-79 kg	H. Hirschganger (West Germany)	Ivan Wray (United Kingdom)	Norbert Schochl (Austria)
-84 kg	Harald Edel (West Germany)	Maurizio Facchinetti (Italy)	Walter Meneghini (Italy)
+84 kg	Norman McKenzie (United Kingdom)	Srienz (Austria)	Ulrich Falck (Switzerland)

== Overall Medals Standing (Top 5) ==
Ranking	Country	Gold (gold)	Silver (silver)	Bronze (bronze)
1	West Germany	9	3	1
2	(Socialist Federal Republic of Yugoslavia) Yugoslavia	2	1	0
3	Italy	1	2	4
4	(United Kingdom) Great Britain	1	1	1
5	Netherlands	1	0	0

== See also ==
- List of WAKO Amateur European Championships
- List of WAKO Amateur World Championships
