= W.A.K.O. European Championships 1982 =

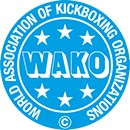
- The poster for W.A.K.O. European Championships 1982
- Promotion: W.A.K.O.
- Date: 1982
- City: Basel, Switzerland

Event chronology
W.A.K.O. European Championships 1981	W.A.K.O. European Championships 1982	W.A.K.O. World Championships 1983

W.A.K.O. European Championships 1982 were the sixth European kickboxing championships hosted by the W.A.K.O. organization organized by Jean-Pierre Schupp and heralded the beginning of W.A.K.O. having its European championships every two years as opposed to once a year. The event was open to amateur men based in Europe and featured only one style of kickboxing - Semi-Contact. By the end of the championships, Italy was the top nation, with regular leaders West Germany beaten into second and Great Britain third. The event was held in Basel, Switzerland in 1981.

== Men's Semi-Contact Kickboxing ==
Semi-Contact kickboxing involved the winning of matches via the scoring of points based on skill, speed and technique, with excessive force outlawed - more information on Semi-Contact can be found on the W.A.K.O. website, although the rules will have changed since 1982. There were seven weight divisions in Semi-Contact ranging from 57 kg/125.4 lbs to over 84 kg/+184.8 lbs. By the end of the championships the top nation in Semi-Contact was Italy with a total of three golds, one silver and one bronze.

=== Men's Semi-Contact Kickboxing Medals Table ===
Event	Gold	Silver	Bronze
-57 kg	Giuliano Sartoni (Italy)	Rainer Knell (West Germany)	Goppen (Belgium)
-63 kg	Luciano Losi (Italy)	Asten (United Kingdom)	Scherbaum (West Germany)
-69 kg	Matala (France)	Klaus Steinheuser (West Germany)	v.d. Myunsbrugge (Belgium)
-74 kg	Leonardo Pavoni (Italy)	Clezardin (France)	Curry (Republic of Ireland)
-79 kg	Ludger Dietze (West Germany)	Federico Milani (Italy)	Page (United Kingdom)
-84 kg	Kurt Windischbacher (Austria)	Klaus Konigsreuther (West Germany)	Michel Koning (Switzerland)
+84 kg	Neville Wray (United Kingdom)	Alois Hoffman (West Germany)	Giorgio Colombo (Italy)

== Overall Medals Standing (Top 5) ==
Ranking	Country	Gold (gold)	Silver (silver)	Bronze (bronze)
1	Italy	3	1	1
2	West Germany	1	4	0
3	(United Kingdom) Great Britain	1	1	1
4	France	1	1	0
5	Austria	1	0	0

== See also ==
- List of WAKO Amateur European Championships
- List of WAKO Amateur World Championships
