= W.A.K.O. European Championships 1981 =

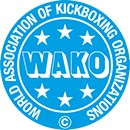
- The poster for W.A.K.O. European Championships 1981
- Promotion: W.A.K.O.
- Date: 1981
- City: (Republic of Ireland) Dublin, Ireland

Event chronology
W.A.K.O. World Championships 1981	W.A.K.O. European Championships 1981	W.A.K.O. European Championships 1982

W.A.K.O. European Championships 1981 were the fifth European kickboxing championships hosted by the W.A.K.O. organization organized by one of the pioneers of Irish kickboxing George Canning. The championships were open to amateur men based in Europe only although each country was allowed more than one competitor per weight division, with the styles on offer being Full-Contact and Semi-Contact kickboxing. By the end of the competition, regular leaders West Germany were the top nation with the largest number of medals, with Great Britain in second and Italy third. The event was held in 1981 in Dublin, Ireland.

== Men's Full-Contact Kickboxing ==
Absent from the 1981 world championships in Milan, Full-Contact returned to the W.A.K.O. European championships in Dublin. There were the usual seven weight divisions, ranging from 57 kg/125.4 lbs to over 84 kg/+184.8 lbs, with all bouts fought under Full-Contact rules. More detail on Full-Contact's rules-set can be found at the W.A.K.O. website, although be aware that the rules have changed since 1981. Notable winners included future K-1 world champion Branko Cikatić winning his third European gold medal in a row, and Ferdinand Mack continued his domination of the -69 kg division, winning his third gold medal at a W.A.K.O. championships (world and European). By the end of the championships Great Britain was the top nation in Full-Contact just about beating West Germany into second with two golds, two silvers and three bronze medals.

=== Men's Full-Contact Kickboxing Medals Table ===
Event	Gold	Silver	Bronze
-57 kg	Michael Kuhr (West Germany)	Howard Brown (United Kingdom)	Uguz (West Germany)
-63 kg	Godfrey Butler (United Kingdom)	Klaus Friedhaber (West Germany)	Sasha Stojanovich (Socialist Federal Republic of Yugoslavia)
-69 kg	Ferdinand Mack (West Germany)	Sandry Ravessoud (Switzerland)	Wellington (United Kingdom)
-74 kg	A. Tommei (Switzerland)	Wilson (United Kingdom)	Dev Barrett (United Kingdom)
-79 kg	Branko Cikatić (Socialist Federal Republic of Yugoslavia)	Dieter Herdel (West Germany)	Steve Babbs (United Kingdom)
-84 kg	Flavio Galessi (Italy)	Spika (Socialist Federal Republic of Yugoslavia)	Cabo (Socialist Federal Republic of Yugoslavia)
+84 kg	Winston Greenwood (United Kingdom)	Miljenco Sarac (Socialist Federal Republic of Yugoslavia)	Michele Panseri (Italy)

== Men's Semi-Contact Kickboxing ==
The Semi-Contact category differed from Full-Contact in that fights were won on points given to superior skill, speed and technique and physical force was limited - more information on Semi-Contact can be found on the W.A.K.O. website, although the rules will have changed since 1981. As with previous events, there were seven weight divisions, ranging from 57 kg/125.4 lbs to over 84 kg/+184.8 lbs. The top nation in Semi-Contact was West Germany with a total of five gold medals.

=== Men's Semi-Contact Kickboxing Medals Table ===
Event	Gold	Silver	Bronze
-57 kg	Coughlan (United Kingdom)	Luciano (Italy)	Paladino (Switzerland)
-63 kg	Mark Aston (United Kingdom)	Mike Schiller (Belgium)	Vosak (Socialist Federal Republic of Yugoslavia)
-69 kg	Fritz Bissot (West Germany)	Ottavio Panunzio (Italy)	Roberts (Republic of Ireland)
-74 kg	Hans Hinz (West Germany)	Federico Milani (Italy)	Clive Parkinson (United Kingdom)
-79 kg	H. Hirschganger (West Germany)	Ivan Wray (United Kingdom)	Sehic (Socialist Federal Republic of Yugoslavia)
-84 kg	Harald Edel (West Germany)	Alfie Lewis (United Kingdom)	Walter Meneghini (Italy)
+84 kg	Rudiger Malzahn (West Germany)	Leavey (Republic of Ireland)	Price (United Kingdom)

== Overall Medals Standing (Top 5) ==
Ranking	Country	Gold (gold)	Silver (silver)	Bronze (bronze)
1	West Germany	7	2	1
2	(United Kingdom) Great Britain	4	4	5
3	Italy	1	4	1
4	(Socialist Federal Republic of Yugoslavia) Yugoslavia	1	2	4
5	Switzerland	1	1	1

== See also ==
- List of WAKO Amateur European Championships
- List of WAKO Amateur World Championships
