= Thai Boxing =

1986 video game

Thai Boxing is a video game for the Commodore 64 published in 1986.

== Reception ==
Ferdy Hamilton for Commodore User said "Overall, Thai Boxing has only two main faults: it's far too easy and we've seen it all before. This one's strictly for die-hard beat 'em up fans, and adventurers." Your Computer rated it a 4 overall and said that "Anco has done a good job. If you want a martial arts game for your 128 and are not already playing Fist in 64 mode, the new features like gore make it well worth examination." Zzap!64 rated the game 55% overall and said "A different approach to a tried and tested theme, sadly making little difference to the content."
