= Erling Havnå =

Norwegian kickboxer (born 1957)

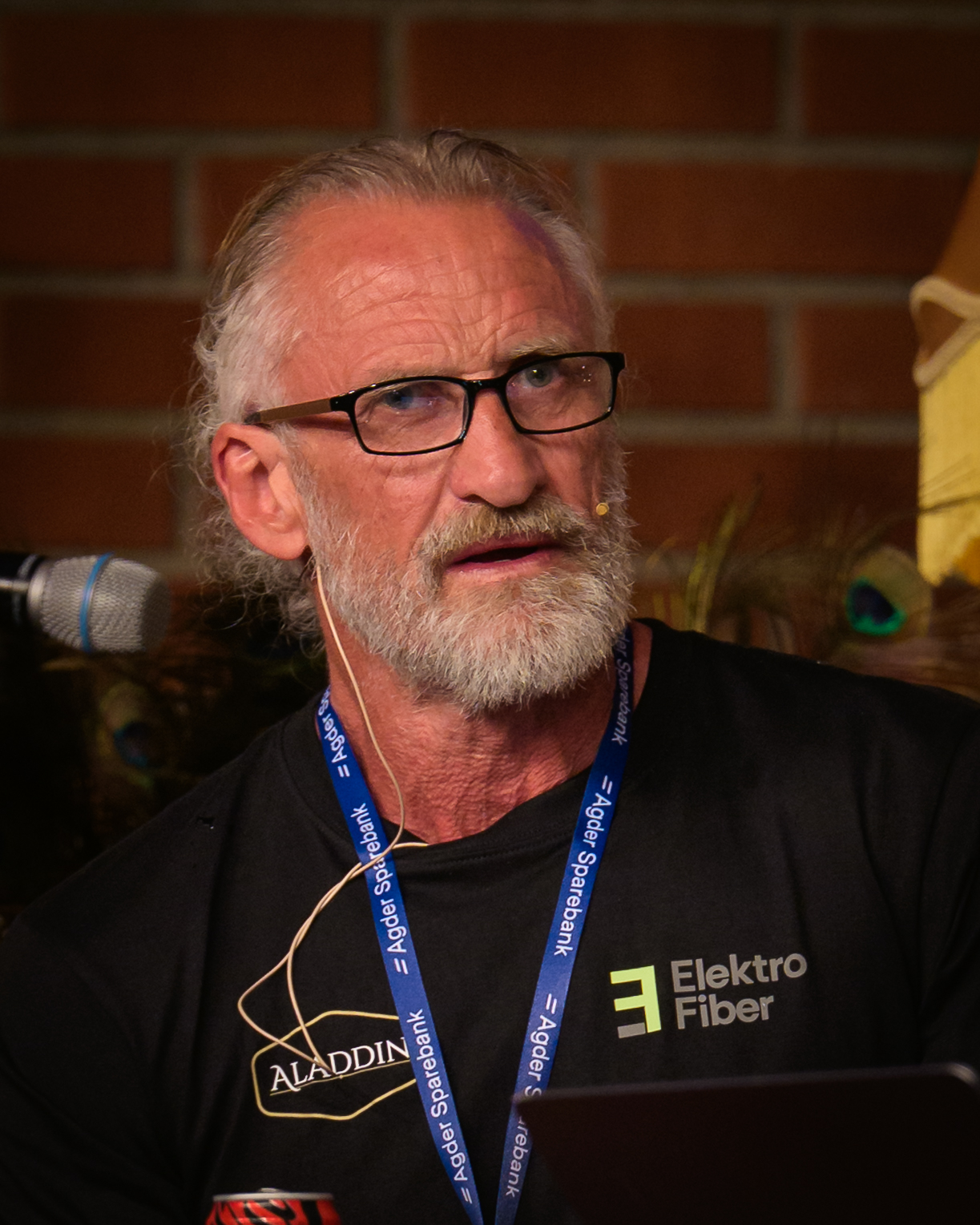
- Havnå being interviewed at a True Crime event in his hometown of Arendal, 2026; Photo: Birgit Fostervold
- Born: Erling Mathias Havnå; 2 November 1957 (age 68); Arendal, Norway
- Known for: The NOKAS robbery
- Relatives: Magne Havnå (brother)

Erling Mathias Havnå (born 2 November 1957) is a former kickboxer and convicted criminal.

In 2005, Erling Havnå was charged and prosecuted for participating in the NOKAS armed robbery of 2004, together with David Toska and twelve other men. On 10 March 2006, the Stavanger court of law sentenced Havnå to 17 years of imprisonment for this felony. This was later reduced to 14 years. One police officer was shot and killed in the robbery.

Havnå won a silver medal in full-contact at the W.A.K.O. European Championships 1979 and stepped up to be the European Champion in 1980. Eleven years later, in 1991, he won the silver medal in the World Championship. With his fifth degree black belt, acquired in 2003, Erling Havnå is the highest ranked Norwegian kickboxer of all time. He is the brother of former professional boxer Magne Havnå.
