= Branko Cikatić =

Croatian kickboxer (1955–2020)

- Born: Branimir Cikatić; 4 October 1955; Split, PR Croatia, Yugoslavia
- Died: 22 March 2020 (aged 64); Solin, Croatia
- Other names: The Croatian Tiger
- Nationality: Croatian
- Height: 1.89 m (6 ft 2.5 in)
- Weight: 98 kg (216 lb; 15.4 st)
- Division: Cruiserweight; Heavyweight
- Reach: 73 in (190 cm)
- Style: Kickboxing
- Fighting out of: Amsterdam, Netherlands
- Team: Tigar Gym; Chakuriki Gym (1984–1998)
- Trainer: Thom Harinck
- Rank: black belt in Shotokan black belt in Taekwondo blue belt in Judo
- Years active: 1972–1999

Kickboxing record
- Total: 102
- Wins: 87
- By knockout: 82
- Losses: 11
- By knockout: 3
- Draws: 3
- No contests: 1

Mixed martial arts record
- Total: 2
- Wins: 0
- Losses: 2
- By submission: 1
- By disqualification: 1

Amateur record
- Total: 170
- Wins: 152
- By knockout: 138
- Losses: 15
- Draws: 3

Other information
- Occupation: Gym owner/Trainer
- Notable students: Mirko "Cro Cop" Filipović, Antonio Plazibat
- Mixed martial arts record from Sherdog
- Last updated on: February 12, 2010

Branko Cikatić (4 October 1955 – 22 March 2020) was a Croatian heavyweight kickboxer, the first Croatian-born fighter to achieve international success. He is widely considered to be one of the greatest heavyweight kickboxers of all time. He was the first K-1 World Grand Prix Champion. The tournament was held on April 30, 1993 in Japan.

== Biography and career ==
Cikatić began his martial arts training at the age of 12 when he took up Taekwondo, and later Shotokan Karate at 16. He eventually earned a black belt in both of these disciplines, as well as a blue belt in Judo. When he was 18 years old, he took up boxing before switching to kickboxing.

He surprised the martial arts world by taking the 1993 K-1 Grand Prix tournament by storm, knocking out all three of his opponents in one evening, including Ernesto Hoost in the final match. To date Cikatić is the oldest winner of the K-1 Grand Prix at 38 years and 208 days.

He extended his athletic resume to include mixed martial arts in 1998, fighting in the Pride Fighting Championships. His PRIDE debut was fought against Ralph White under K-1 rules format. Cikatić lost via disqualification after kicking the head of the downed White. Cikatić returned at Pride 2, fighting under MMA rules and facing Mark Kerr. He was again disqualified after holding the ring ropes when Kerr attempted a takedown, refusing to let go when directed by the referee, running away through the ring ropes, and delivering several illegal elbows to the back of Kerr's head. His next fight at Pride 7 ended in a submission loss to Maurice Smith by forearm choke.

Towards the end of his sports career, Cikatić tried his hand at acting, playing a villain in a 1997 B-movie Skyscraper, starring Anna Nicole Smith. In 2018, Cikatić had a pulmonary embolism and whilst in hospital acquired an infection causing sepsis and was later diagnosed as suffering from Parkinson's disease. He died on 22 March 2020.

== Titles ==
Professional career

- 1998 WMTA World Champion in Thai boxing (Zagreb)
- 1994 K-1 Grand Prix 3rd Place (Tokyo)
- 1993 K-1 World Grand Prix Champion (Tokyo)
- 1991 World Champion in Thai boxing 86 kg (Berlin)
- 1991 IKBF World Champion in kick-boxing 86 kg (Zagreb)
- 1991 WKA World Champion in kick-boxing 86 kg (Wiesbaden)
- 1989 WMTA World champion in Thai boxing 86 kg (Düsseldorf)
- 1987 WMTA World champion in Thai boxing 82.5 kg (Amsterdam)
- 1986 European champion in Thai boxing (Paris)
- 1985 European champion in Thai boxing (Amsterdam)

Amateur career

- 1983 European Championships in Caen (gold) (full-contact)
- 1982 European Championships in Berlin (gold) (full-contact)
- 1981 W.A.K.O. European Championships in Dublin (gold) -79 kg (full-contact)
- 1981 W.K.K.A. World Championships in Miami (gold) 79 kg (full-contact)
- 1980 W.A.K.O. European Championships in London (gold) -79 kg (full-contact)
- 1979 W.A.K.O. European Championships in Milan (gold) -79 kg (full-contact)

== Kickboxing record (incomplete) ==
87 wins (82 knockouts), 11 losses, 3 draw, 1 no contest
Date	Result	Opponent	Event	Method	Round	Time	Location
July 18, 2005	Draw	(Japan) Hirofumi Kanayama	WORLD OYAZI BATTLE -SAMURAI RETURN!-	Decision	2	N/A	Tokyo, Japan
July 11, 1999	Win	(Japan) Benkai Sato	Kakidamishi I	KO (liver punch)	1	0:23	Naha, Okinawa, Japan
December 13, 1998	Win	(Netherlands) Big Mo T	Muay Thai WMTA World Title Fight Heavyweight	KO (right punch)	N/A	N/A	Dvorana Dražen Petrović, Zagreb, Croatia
October 11, 1997	No contest	(United States) Ralph White	Pride 1	NC (Cikatić kicked White while he was on the ground)	1	1:52	Tokyo, Japan
September 7, 1997	Loss	(South Africa) Mike Bernardo	K-1 Grand Prix '97 1st round	TKO (doctor stoppage)	1	0:38	Osaka, Japan
July 20, 1997	Loss	(Australia) Sam Greco	K-1 Dream '97	KO (right hooks)	1	2:58	Nagoya, Japan
March 16, 1997	Win	(Japan) Musashi	K-1 Kings '97	KO (right punch)	4	1:38	Yokohama, Japan
December 12, 1994	Win	(Netherlands) Ernesto Hoost	K-1 Legend	KO (right hook)	2	1:18	Nagoya, Japan
September 18, 1994	Loss	(Australia) Stan Longinidis	K-1 Revenge	Decision (unanimous)	5	3:00	Yokohama, Japan
April 30, 1994	Loss	(Japan) Masaaki Satake	K-1 Grand Prix '94	Decision (unanimous)	3	3:00	Tokyo, Japan
April 30, 1994	Win	(Netherlands) Andre Mannaart	K-1 Grand Prix '94	KO (right punch)	2	0:16	Tokyo, Japan
March 4, 1994	Loss	(Switzerland) Andy Hug	K-1 Challenge	Decision (unanimous)	5	3:00	Tokyo, Japan
April 30, 1993	Win	(Netherlands) Ernesto Hoost	K-1 Grand Prix '93	KO (right hook)	1	2:49	Tokyo, Japan
Wins K-1 Grand Prix '93.
April 30, 1993	Win	(Japan) Masaaki Satake	K-1 Grand Prix '93	KO (left hook)	3	0:45	Tokyo, Japan
April 30, 1993	Win	(Thailand) Changpuek Kiatsongrit	K-1 Grand Prix '93	KO (punch)	1	2:35	Tokyo, Japan
April 8, 1993	Win	(Morocco) Mahmoud Babachi	Muay Thai World Title Fight	KO (Babachi injured shoulder after throw in clinch)	1	1:42	Zagreb, Croatia
1992	Win	(Croatia) Novica Bogdanovic		KO (left punch)	1	0:38	Zagreb, Croatia
June, 1992	Loss	(Australia) Stan Longinidis	World Kickboxing Association	Decision (unanimous)	12	2:00	Melbourne, Australia
March 16, 1992	Draw	(United States) Dennis Alexio	World Martial Arts Challenge	Technical draw (Alexio hit Cikatić during a stoppage)	3	1:25	(United States) Las Vegas, Nevada, U.S.
October 19, 1991	Win	(France) Jean Atonga	Muay Thai WMTA World Title Fight, -86 kg	Decision (split)	5	3:00	Deutschlandhalle, Berlin Germany
May 28, 1991	Win	(Netherlands) Charlie Lieuwfeld	IKBF World Title Fight, -86 kg	KO (body shot)	5	N/A	Zagreb, Croatia
March 23, 1991	Win	(Netherlands) Andre Mannaart	World Kickboxing Association World Title Fight, -86 kg	Decision (unanimous)	12	2:00	Rhein-Main-Hallen, Wiesbaden, Germany
January, 1991	Win	(France) Stephane Lahousse	Savate Rules	KO	2	N/A	Zagreb, Croatia
October, 1990	Draw	(Socialist Republic of Montenegro) Samir Usenagić	Kickboxing Prestige Fight	Decision	5	2:00	(Socialist Federal Republic of Yugoslavia) Belgrade, SFR Yugoslavia
December 16, 1989	Win	(United Kingdom) Carl Thompson	Muay Thai WMTA World Title Fight, -86 kg	Decision (unanimous)	5	3:00	Philipshalle, Düsseldorf, Germany
October 8, 1989	Loss	(Netherlands) Ernesto Hoost	Muay Thai WMTA World Title Fight	DQ	4	0:15	Amsterdam, Netherlands, NED
December 12, 1987	Loss	(United States) Don Wilson	KICK Association: Lightheavyweight World Title Fight	TKO	7	1:24	(United States) Orlando, Florida, U.S.
May 30, 1987	Win	(Socialist Republic of Montenegro) Radomir Bozovic	Kickboxing Prestige Fight	TKO	5	N/A	(Socialist Federal Republic of Yugoslavia) Sportski Centar Gripe, Split, Croatia
April 26, 1987	Win	(United Kingdom) Carl Thompson	Muay Thai WMTA World Title Fight	TKO	3	2:18	Amsterdam, Netherlands
October 17, 1986	Win	(Socialist Republic of Montenegro) Radomir Bozovic	Kickboxing Prestige Fight	KO	7	N/A	(Socialist Federal Republic of Yugoslavia) Ivangrad, Montenegro, Socialist Republic of Montenegro
1986	Loss	(Socialist Republic of Montenegro) Dragan Ognjenovic	Kickboxing Prestige Fight	DQ (Cikatic KOed Ognjenovic after break)	3	N/A	(Socialist Federal Republic of Yugoslavia) Niksic, Montenegro, Socialist Republic of Montenegro
1986	Win	(United Kingdom) Kirk Walker	Muay Thai EMTA European Title Fight	KO	2	N/A	Paris, France
December 19, 1985	Win	(United Kingdom) Tony Bristow	Kickboxing European Title Fight	TKO	2	1:05	(Socialist Federal Republic of Yugoslavia) Sportski Centar Gripe, Split, Croatia
May 26, 1985	Win	(Netherlands) Jan Oosterbaan	Muay Thai EMTA European Title Fight	TKO (Oosterbaan's corner retired after round 3)	3	3:00	Amsterdam, Netherlands
March 29, 1985	Win	(Italy) Bruno Campiglia	Kickboxing	KO (body shot)	5	N/A	(Socialist Federal Republic of Yugoslavia) Sportski Centar Gripe, Split, Croatia
1984	Win	(Socialist Republic of Croatia) Krstulovic	Kickboxing	KO	N/A	N/A	(Socialist Federal Republic of Yugoslavia) , Split, Croatia
1984	Win	(Netherlands) Kenneth Plak	Muay Thai Eliminator for European Title	KO	1	N/A	Amsterdam, Netherlands
1983	Loss	(Socialist Republic of Croatia) Vjekoslav Šafranić	Kickboxing Prestige Fight	Decision	7	N/A	(Socialist Federal Republic of Yugoslavia) Dom Sportova, Zagreb, Croatia
August 18, 1983	Win	(France) Pascal Ducros		KO	2	N/A	(Socialist Federal Republic of Yugoslavia) Stadium Poljud, Split, Croatia
1983	Loss	(Italy) Maurizio Callegari	WAKO World Championship, 80 kg, Title Defence	N/A	N/A	N/A	Palermo, Italy
March 20, 1982	Win	(Switzerland) Jean Marc Tonus	WAKO World Championship, 80 kg, Title Defence	Decision (unanimous)	6	2:00	(Socialist Federal Republic of Yugoslavia) Sportski Centar Gripe, Split, Croatia
November, 1981	Win	(United States) Ray McCallum	WAKO World Championship	Technical decision (after headbutt: 38:38, 40:38, 38:37)	4	N/A	Miami, United States

== Mixed martial arts record ==
Professional record breakdown
2 matches	0 wins	2 losses
By submission	0	1
By disqualification	0	1

Res.	Record	Opponent	Method	Event	Date	Round	Time	Location	Notes
Loss	0–2	Maurice Smith	Submission (forearm choke)	Pride 7	September 12, 1999	1	7:33		
Loss	0–1	Mark Kerr	DQ (grabbing the ropes)	Pride 2	March 15, 1998	1	2:14		

== See also ==
- List of K-1 events
- List of K-1 champions
- List of male kickboxers
