= Battlecade Extreme Fighting =

Mixed martial arts promoter based in New York City

Battlecade: Extreme Fighting
- Industry: Mixed martial arts promotion
- Founded: November 1995
- Founder: Rick Blume
- Headquarters: New York City, New York, United States
- Key people: Rick Blume, president and CEO; Donald Zuckerman, executive producer John Perretti, matchmaker

Battlecade: Extreme Fighting, sometimes referred to simply as Extreme Fighting, was a mixed martial arts promotion which hosted four events in the United States and Canada between 1995 and 1997. Although few events were held, a number of well known fighters competed for the promotion. Battlecade CEO Rick Blume is credited with coining the phrase mixed martial arts and the promotion was the first to implement weight classes in MMA.

Despite the number of fighters which the promotion was able to attract, Battlecade struggled financially and had trouble with authorities over the sanctioning of MMA bouts. Following the fourth and final Extreme Fighting event, General Media International, Battlecade sponsor and publisher of Penthouse, withdrew their financial support of the promotion. Additionally, cable television providers Tele-Communications Inc. and Request TV refused to air further Extreme Fighting events.

== History ==
=== Extreme Fighting 1 ===
The first Extreme Fighting event was planned to be held in Brooklyn, New York on November 18, 1995. Pressure from state politicians forced the event to be moved to Wilmington, North Carolina on a single day's notice. This event featured a four-man heavyweight tournament which was won by eventual American Top Team co-founder Marcus Silveira. Silveira defeated Victor Tatarkin of Russia by submission via strikes in the semi-finals of the tournament, moving on to defeat Gary Myers via guillotine choke in the finals. With his victory over Myers, Silveira became the Extreme Fighting Heavyweight Champion.

This event also featured a four-man middleweight tournament, showcasing judoka Igor Zinoviev and Brazilian Jiu-Jitsu practitioner Mario Sperry. Zinoviev defeated his first opponent, Harold German, an accomplished but notably outweighed New York-based boxer, by submission via strikes. Sperry won by the same means against his opponent, UFC 6 competitor Rudyard Moncayo. Zinoviev defeated Sperry in the finals by technical knockout to become Extreme Fighting Middleweight Champion.

In addition to the two tournaments held that night, the event featured Ralph Gracie and a bout between Carlson Gracie Jr. and John Lewis which ended in a draw after twenty minutes.

=== Extreme Fighting 2 ===
On April 26, 1996, a second Extreme Fighting event was held in Montreal, Quebec, Canada. Marcus Silveira and Igor Zinoviev were victorious in separate bouts. An eighteen-year-old Carlos Newton, who would go on to become a champion in the UFC, made his professional debut that night, fighting eventual K-1 USA Grand Prix '98 competitor, and a man almost twice his size, in Jean Riviere. Newton lost the bout via submission by a small package(when an opponent is on their back with their legs being smashed atop of them).

Ralph Gracie returned to action and was declared Extreme Fighting Lightweight Champion after defeating Steve Nelson via submission in the first round of their bout.

Despite arrangements made with the Kahnawake tribal council for the event to be held, Montreal authorities arrested a number of the evening's competitors, the referee, announcer, and Battlecade's matchmaker following the event.

=== Extreme Fighting 3 ===
Tulsa, Oklahoma hosted the third Extreme Fighting event on the night of October 18, 1996. In one of the most recognized bouts from the short-lived promotion, kickboxer and eventual UFC Heavyweight Champion Maurice Smith defeated Marcus Silveira via technical knockout to become the new Extreme Fighting Heavyweight Champion.

Matt Hume and Erik Paulson, who both went on to become well known trainers after their fighting careers ended, battled until Paulson suffered a cut in the third round of their bout.

Igor Zinoviev retained his middleweight championship after fighting to a draw with John Lober. A bout between John Lewis and Vale Tudo fighter Johil de Oliveira also ended in a draw.

Ralph Gracie submitted Ali Mihoubi via armbar to retain his lightweight championship. Eventual Pride competitor Kazunari Murakami defeated Bart Vale via technical knockout, while Anthony Macias submitted to the strikes of Allan Goes. Angolan fighter João Roque - who went on to compete in the UFC, DEEP, and Shooto - defeated Abdelaziz Cherigui via armbar.

=== Extreme Fighting 4 ===
The final Extreme Fighting event was held in Des Moines, Iowa on March 28, 1997. Kevin Jackson, Olympic gold medalist freestyle wrestler and winner of the UFC 14 middleweight tournament, defeated John Lober via arm triangle choke. In what was his lone professional MMA bout, Kenny Monday, another Olympic gold medalist in freestyle wrestling, defeated John Lewis via technical knockout.

Matt Hume proved victorious against Miletich Fighting Systems founder Pat Miletich, who suffered a fight-ending broken nose. Allan Goes defeated Todd Bjornethun via triangle choke, while Erik Paulson fought Paul Jones to a draw.

Finally, Maurice Smith defended his heavyweight title against Kazunari Murakami. Their bout ended decisively, as Smith knocked Murakami out in the first round.

Neither the middleweight or lightweight titles were defended on the final Extreme Fighting card, as champions Igor Zinoviev and Ralph Gracie did not appear. Zinoviev was unable to compete because of a separated shoulder. Gracie's scheduled opponent, Luta Livre fighter Eugenio Tadeu, was unable to attend the event and Battlecade could not find a replacement in time.

== Extreme Fighting Champions ==
=== Heavyweight Championship ===
Weight limit: Unlimited

No.	Name	Date	Location	Defenses
1	(Brazil) Marcus Silveira (def. Gary Myers)	November 18, 1995 (Extreme Fighting 1)	Wilmington, North Carolina, US	def. Carl Franks on April 26, 1996 in Montreal, Quebec, Canada (Extreme Fighting 2)
2	(United States) Maurice Smith	October 18, 1996 (Extreme Fighting 3)	Tulsa, Oklahoma, US	def. Kazunari Murakami on March 28, 1997 in Des Moines, Iowa, US (Extreme Fighting 4)

=== Middleweight Championship ===
Weight limit: 200 lb (90.7 kg; 14.3 st)

No.	Name	Date	Location	Defenses
1	(Russia) Igor Zinoviev (def. Mario Sperry)	November 18, 1995 (Extreme Fighting 1)	Wilmington, North Carolina, US	def. Steve Faulkner on April 26, 1996 in Montreal, Quebec, Canada (Extreme Fighting 2); drew with John Lober on October 18, 1996 in Tulsa, Oklahoma, US (Extreme Fighting 3)

=== Lightweight Championship ===
Weight limit: 150 lb (68.0 kg; 10.7 st)

No.	Name	Date	Location	Defenses
1	(Brazil) Ralph Gracie (def. Steve Nelson)	April 26, 1996 (Extreme Fighting 2)	Montreal, Quebec, Canada	def. Ali Mihoubi on October 18, 1996 in Tulsa, Oklahoma, US (Extreme Fighting 3)
