= Georg F Brueckner =

German martial artist

Georg Frederic Brueckner (30 July 1930 - 30 December 1992) was a German martial arts pioneer and inventor of fighting sports gear used for boxing, kickboxing and other pugilistic sports. He died in Berlin aged 62.

== Martial arts career ==
In 1952 he began practicing martial arts and studied judo, karate, jujutsu. In 1961 he opened his first karate dojo in Wilmersdorf, West-Berlin. When Mike Anderson and Hans Vierthaler opened the first Taekwondo sports club in Garmisch Partenkirchen in January 1963 he started studies in Taekwondo. He and Vierthaler became the first Germans to receive black belt diplomas from Korean Grandmaster Choi Hong Hi. Starting in 1974 Bruckner promoted the first kickboxing and martial arts shows in Europe which earned him recognition as the "Father of European Kickboxing".

Together with Mike Anderson Brueckner went on to create sport karate tournaments where contact was allowed. In 1976 they founded WAKO, a global sanctioning body for amateur kickboxing. Brueckner went on to promote the first WAKO World Championships in 1978 in Berlin and the fifth WAKO World Championships in 1987 in Munich's Olympic Hall. Both events created large crowds and publicity for the sport of kickboxing. He promoted many more events staging the heroes of martial arts including Bill Wallace, Joe Lewis, Jhoon Rhee, Fumio Demura, Bruce Lee widow Linda Lee, Jeff Smith and many others.

== Inventions ==
Georg Frederic Brueckner was a vivid proponent of fair sports competition and sought to create safety gear for the martial arts that would allow practitioners of various styles competing against each other without the risk of serious injuries. With the support of the medical and scientific community Brueckner created the Top Ten equipment using a highly flexible polyurethane padding for head, foot and hand protectors for pugilistic sports. Initially designed for kickboxing competition, Brueckner modified the hand protectors to become boxing gloves used in amateur boxing competition. Many of his inventions were patented in the USA, Germany, Japan and other countries. His boxing gloves and headgear were introduced as official gear for the Olympic Games in Barcelona 1992, Atlanta 1996 and Sydney 2000. It was the first modern boxing glove made with highly shock dampening polyurethane padding.
