= Baboo Da Silva =

Brazilian martial artist (born 1967)

- Born: Mauricio Da Silva; November 28, 1967 (age 58); Ivaipora Parana, Brazil
- Other names: "Baboo"
- Nationality: (Brazil) Brazilian
- Height: 1.80 m (5 ft 11 in)
- Style: Kyokushin Karate, Muay Thai, Kickboxing, Submission wrestling Brazilian Jiu-jitsu
- Trainer: Seiji Isobe
- Rank: black belt in Kyokushin purple belt in Brazilian Jiu-Jitsu

Mauricio "Baboo" Da Silva (born November 28, 1967) is a Brazilian kyokushin kaikan full contact karate practitioner and former professional kickboxer and mixed martial artist. He is a professional coach and trainer of K-1 and MMA (Mixed Martial Arts), who has trained a number of world class fighters including Francisco Filho (martial artist), Glaube Feitosa, Andrews Nakahara, Ewerton Teixeira, Ray Sefo, Aleksandr Pitchkounov, Takumi Sato, Jan Soukup, Kou Tasei (aka Hong Tae Seong), Jan Nortje, Doug Viney, Mighty Mo (kickboxer) and Akebono Taro. From 1998 to 2004, he worked as the trainer and sparring partner for Francisco Filho. He lived in Tokyo, Japan from 2005 to December 2010 and trained fighters from the IKO1 Kyokushin - Team Ichigeki and other fighters from visiting teams at the Ichigeki Plaza. He fought in the K-1 PREMIUM 2003 Dynamite!! and also in the Ichigeki events in Japan.

== Biography and career ==
Mauricio was born in Ivaipora Parana, Brazil on November 28, 1967. At age 17, he started Kyokushin studying under Shihan Seiji Isobe in São Paulo along with other students such as Francisco Filho (martial artist). Mauricio lived in the dojo as an uchi-deshi under Shihan Isobe who was responsible for introducing Kyokushin to Brazil. Mauricio holds a 1st Dan Black belt in Kyokushin karate and trained together with the Brazilian Kyokushin World Cup team as a sparring partner for fighters such as Francisco Filho and Glaube Feitosa. Francisco Filho became the Kyokushin world champion in 1999.

After this Mauricio became Filho's sparring partner and trainer for kickboxing. During this time he practiced Muay Thai, Kickboxing, Submission wrestling and other forms of Mixed martial arts. He also holds a purple belt in Brazilian Jiu-jitsu

In 2000, he helped Francisco Filho (martial artist) become the Champion at K-1 World Grand Prix 2000 in Yokohama by beating Cyril Abidi. In 2001, Filho was the Repechage A Tournament Champion at K-1 World Grand Prix 2001 in Fukuoka, after beating Sergei Ivanovich and then Lloyd van Dams in the final, and in 2001 he was the Runner-up at the K-1 World Grand Prix 2001 Final after beating Peter Aerts and Alexey Ignashov and then being beaten by Mark Hunt in the final. In 2004, they trained together in the Vos Gym in Amsterdam, the Netherlands to prepare for Filho's fight against Remy Bonjasky which Filho won.

After Filho retired in 2004 Mauricio began to work more with Glaube Feitosa and they both relocated to Tokyo, Japan where they joined Team Ichigeki. The training team based at Ichigeki plaza in Ebisu, Tokyo was made up of 3 trainers. Mauricio was the only trainer directly from Kyokushin. Mauricio concentrated on kickboxing and MMA fighting.

The other two trainers are Jayson Vemoa a professional Muay Thai World Champion and Fai Falamoe a professional boxer - Muhammed Ali Cup Boxing Champion.

In 2003 and 2005, he was the sparring partner for the Brazilian Kyokushin World Cup Team. In 2003 Glaube Feitosa placed fourth at the 8th Kyokushin World Open Tournament Championship and in 2005 he was the MVP at the Kyokushin Karate World Cup in Paris.

In K-1 fights Mauricio helped Glaube for the K-1 World Grand Prix 2006 in Tokyo Final where he won his quarter final fight by knocking out Ruslan Karaev in the first round but was beaten by Peter Aerts in the semi-final. He also made the quarter-finals of the K-1 World Grand Prix 2007 Final, the final 16 at the K-1 World Grand Prix 2008 in Seoul Final 16 and the K-1 World Grand Prix 2008 in Seoul Final 16.

From 2005, Mauricio helped train Ray Sefo at the Ichigeki Plaza in Tokyo. Some of Ray Sefo's notable titles and accomplishments while working with Mauricio include his fight in 2007 at the K-1 World Grand Prix 2007 in Yokohama against four-time World Grand Prix Champion Semmy Schilt for the new Super Heavyweight title. In Round 1, Sefo knocked Schilt down to become one of only three fighters in K-1 history to ever knock down Semmy Schilt. However, he would go on to lose by KO in round 2. Others wins include fights against Melvin Manhoef in the K-1 World Grand Prix 2006 in Tokyo Final, against Ruslan Karaev K-1 World Grand Prix 2006 in Seoul and against Hong man choi K-1 World Grand Prix 2008 Final held in Yokohama.

After becoming the 9th Kyokushin World Champion in 2007 Ewerton Teixeira entered K-1 in 2008 and joined Team Ichigeki in Tokyo, Japan where he was trained by Mauricio. In his first year Ewerton won the Japan K-1 WGP Tournament Championship Title Belt by defeating Keijiro Maeda in the final at the K-1 World GP 2008 in Fukuoka. Ewerton qualified for the top 8 at K-1 World Grand Prix 2008 Final after defeating Musashi (kickboxer) but in the quarter-final ended up losing a close fight against Errol Zimmerman by decision. In 2009 he again made the top 8 at the K-1 World Grand Prix 2009 Final after beating Jerome Le Banner and Singh Jaideep. He was knocked out in the quarter-final by Alistair Overeem At the K-1 World Grand Prix 2010 Final in Tokyo Ewerton defeated Errol Zimmerman.

Other Team Ichigeki fighters who Mauricio trained for K-1 and MMA events include Aleksandr Pitchkounov whose notable achievements include gaining 2nd place in K-1 World Grand Prix 2007 in Hawaii, he was also the runner up at K-1 World Grand Prix 2008 in Taipei and gained 3rd place K-1 World Grand Prix 2007 in Las Vegas. Takumi Sato who gained 3rd place in K-1 World GP 2008 in Fukuoka and was also 3rd at K-1 World Grand Prix 2009 in Seoul. Kou Tasei (aka Hong Tae Seong) who was placed 3rd at the KOK World GP 2010 in Chisinau an 8-man -85 kg tournament. Jan Soukup who fought in K-1 World Grand Prix 2010 in Bucharest and K-1 World Grand Prix 2009 Final Opening match and Kengo Shimizu who beat Shunsuke Inoue at the S-Cup World Tournament Final 2010 -super fight- Shootboxing.

Mauricio trained a number of visiting fighters at the Ichigeki Plaza including Jan Nortje who Mauricio trained in MMA and kickboxing for fights against fighters such as Peter Aerts at K-1 World GP 2008 in Fukuoka, Gary Goodridge at K-1 Hero's 8, Tom Erikson for the Gladiators/Deep event in Okayama which Jan won and against Rameau Thierry Sokoudjou at the Dream 9 -Super hulk Grand Prix 2009. He helped prepare Doug Viney for fights against Badr Hari and Zabit Samedov, Rony Sefo against Dushiko Basrak, Jordan Tai against Mafio Canoletti, Mighty Mo (kickboxer) who beat Kim Min-Soo at Hero's 8 in Nagoya, Japan, Fabiano Da Silva who beat Jan Kaszuba at K-1 World MAX 2010 -70kg World Championship Tournament Final and fought Zabit Samedov at K-1 World Grand Prix 2008 in Seoul Final 16, and Akebono Taro for his K-1 PREMIUM 2005 Dynamite!! Hero's MMA fight against Bobby Ologun.

Mauricio fought Sylvester Terkay (aka The Predator) at the K-1 PREMIUM 2003 Dynamite!! in Nagoya, Japan under K-1 MMA rules and lost the fight by TKO. He fought Nobuaki Kakuda in the K-1 Andy Memorial 2001 Japan GP Final. He took part in the Ichigeki Professional Kickboxing Events winning his fight in January, 2002 at "1.11 Ichigeki" by 1R KO. at "8.10 Ichigeki" in August 2002, he and also won by 1R KO against Tiger. In February 2003, he lost by a 2R KO against Nishda at "2.22 Ichigeki".

== Coaching Championship Titles ==
- 2010 Ewerton Teixeira K-1 WGP Final 8 (defeated Errol Zimmerman)
- 2010 Ewerton Teixeira K-1 WGP Oceania ( defeated Alex Roberts)
- 2009 Ewerton Teixeira K-1 WGP Final 8 (lost to Alistair Overeem)
- 2009 Ewerton Teixeira K-1 WGP Final 16 (defeated Singh Jaideep)
- 2009 Ewerton Teixeira K-1 WGP Super Fight Champion ( defeated Jerome Le Banner)
- 2009 Takumi Sato K-1 WGP Asia - 3rd place (lost to Taiei Kin)
- 2008 Takumi Sato K-1 WGP Japan - 3rd place (lost to Keijiro Maeda)
- 2008 Ewerton Teixeira K-1 WGP Final 8 (lost to Errol Zimmerman)
- 2008 Ewerton Teixeira K-1 WGP Final 16 (defeated Musashi (kickboxer))
- 2008 Ewerton Teixeira K-1 WGP Winner Japan Champion ( defeated Keijiro Maeda)
- 2008 Aleksandr Pichkunov K-1 WGP Asia - 2nd place ( lost to Ruslan Karaev)
- 2008 Aleksandr Pichkunov K-1 WGP USA - 2nd place ( lost to Mighty Mo (kickboxer))
- 2007 Glaube Feitosa K-1 WGP Final 8 (lost to Semmy Schilt)
- 2006 Glaube Feitosa K-1 WGP Final 8 - 3rd place (lost to Peter Aerts)
- 2005 Glaube Feitosa K-1 WGP Final 8 - 2nd place (lost to Semmy Schilt)
- 2001 Francisco Filho K-1 WGP Final 8 - 2nd place ( lost to Mark Hunt)
- 2001 Francisco Filho K-1 WGP Repechage A Champion (defeated Lloyd van Dams)
- 2000 Francisco Filho K-1 WGP in Yokohama Winner (defeated Cyril Abidi)
