= K-1 World Grand Prix 2010 in Seoul Final 16 =

Martial arts event

K-1 World Grand Prix 2010 Final 16
- The poster for K-1 World Grand Prix 2010 Final 16
- Promotion: K-1
- Date: October 02, 2010
- Venue: Olympic Gymnastics Arena
- City: (South Korea) Seoul, Republic of Korea
- Attendance: 12,719

Event chronology
K-1 World Grand Prix 2010 in Canberra	K-1 World Grand Prix 2010 Final 16	K-1 World MAX 2010 in Seoul World Championship Tournament Final 16

K-1 World Grand Prix 2010 in Seoul Final 16 was a martial arts event held by the K-1 on Saturday, October 2, 2010 at the Olympic Gymnastics Arena in Seoul, Korea. It was the Final Elimination tournament for top sixteen fighters. The winners qualified for the K-1 World Grand Prix 2010 Final held on December 11, 2010 at Yokohama Arena, Japan.

The eight finalists from K-1 World Grand Prix 2009 Final were automatically qualified, except Remy Bonjasky who could not compete. The eighth spot was filled by K-1 Heavyweight champion, Keijiro Maeda then two World GP 2010 tournament winners from the Bucharest and Canberra. The last six spots were selected by fan voting.

Badr Hari did not enter the tournament for as yet unknown reasons, being replaced by Andrei Arlovski. On September 21, 2010, Michael Schiavello confirmed on his Twitter one last modification of the final card, Ray Sefo replaced Ruslan Karaev. On September 28, 2010, Andrei Arlovski announced on Twitter that he would not fight in the tournament. The Belarusian was replaced by Mighty Mo.

== Final 16 Participating Fighters ==
=== Qualified ===
- (Netherlands) Semmy Schilt (K-1 World Grand Prix 2009 Final Champion)
- (Netherlands) Alistair Overeem (2009 Grand Prix Semi Finalist)
- (Brazil) Ewerton Teixeira (2009 Grand Prix Quarter Finalist)
- (France) Jerome Le Banner (2009 Grand Prix Quarter Finalist)
- (Netherlands) Errol Zimmerman (2009 Grand Prix Quarter Finalist)
- (Japan) Kyotaro (K-1 Heavyweight Champion)
- (France) Freddy Kemayo (K-1 World Grand Prix 2010 in Bucharest Champion)
- (Australia) Ben Edwards (K-1 World Grand Prix 2010 in Canberra Champion)

=== Wild cards ===
- (Netherlands) Peter Aerts
- (New Zealand) Ray Sefo
- (Romania) Daniel Ghiță
- (Romania) Raul Cătinaș
- (Turkey) Gökhan Saki
- (Suriname) Tyrone Spong
- (Egypt) Hesdy Gerges
- (United States) Mighty Mo

== Results ==
K-1 World GP 2010 Final 16 results
Opening Fight: K-1 Rules / 3Min. 3R
(South Korea) Hyun Man Myung def. Min Ho Song (South Korea)
Myung defeated Song by KO (right hook) at 0:35 of the 1st round.
Super Fights: K-1 Rules / 3Min. 3R Ext. 1R
(Bosnia and Herzegovina) Dževad Poturak def. Chalid Arrab (Germany)
Poturak defeated Arrab by TKO (corner stoppage) at 0:06 of the 3rd round.
(Russia) Sergey Kharitonov def. Takumi Sato (Japan)
Kharitonov defeated Sato by KO (right hook) at 2:30 of the 1st round.
K-1 World GP 2010 Final 16 Elimination Fights: K-1 Rules / 3Min. 3R Ext. 2R
(Suriname) Tyrone Spong def. Ray Sefo (New Zealand)
Spong defeated Sefo by 3rd round unanimous decision 3-0 (30-27, 30-28, 30-28).
(Turkey) Gökhan Saki def. Freddy Kemayo (France)
Saki defeated Kemayo by KO (3 knockdown, punch rush) at 2:14 of the 1st round.
(Romania) Daniel Ghiță def. Errol Zimmerman (Netherlands)
Ghiţă defeated Zimmerman by KO (right straight) at 0:18 of the 2nd round.
(Japan) Kyotaro def. Jérôme Le Banner (France)
Kyotaro defeated Le Banner by forfeit before the 1st extra round due to disagreement with the judges decision. After 3 rounds the judges had scored it a majority draw 1-0 (30-29, 29-29, 29-29) in favor of Le Banner.
(Netherlands) Peter Aerts def. Ewerton Teixeira (Brazil)
Aerts defeated Teixeira by extra round unanimous decision 3-0 (10-9, 10-9, 10-9). After 3 rounds the judges had scored it a majority draw 1-0 (30-30, 30-30, 30-29) in favor of Teixeira.
(United States) Mighty Mo def. Raul Cătinaș (Romania)
Mo defeated Cătinaş by 3rd round unanimous decision 3-0 (30-27, 30-27, 30-28).
(Netherlands) Semmy Schilt def. Hesdy Gerges (Egypt)
Schilt defeated Gerges by 3rd round split decision 2-1 (30-28, 30-29, 29-30).
(Netherlands) Alistair Overeem def. Ben Edwards (Australia)
Overeem defeated Edwards by KO (right hook/3 knockdowns) at 2:08 of the 1st round.

== See also ==
- List of K-1 events
- List of K-1 champions
- List of male kickboxers
