= Adam Lovelock =

Australian boxer

- Born: Adam John Lovelock; 12 December 1982 (age 43); Canberra, Australia
- Other name: Lethal
- Occupation: Professional Boxer
- Known for: Professional Boxing
- Notable work: World Boxing Council (WBC) Regional Champion WBF Australasian Champion World Boxing Foundation

Adam Lovelock (born 12 December 1982 in Canberra) is a retired Australian professional boxer. Lovelock was ranked in the Australian National Boxing Federation (ANBF) and by the World Boxing Council (WBC), after winning the WBCABCO Cruiserweight (boxing) title in 2012. Lovelock is now a Boxing Matchmaker and Sports commentator for Australian Professional boxing.

== Education ==
Lovelock held a scholarship in the Talented Sports program at Erindale College in Canberra.

== Amateur Boxing ==
Lovelock held an amateur boxing record of 73 Wins, 11 Losses, and was affiliated with Boxing Australia. Lovelock was a multiple State, and two time National Amateur Champion. Lovelock trained out of the Australian Institute of Sport.

== Professional career ==
Lovelock retired with a professional Boxing record of 12 wins, 7 losses, and competed out of Canberra and Brisbane.

== Professional Boxing Titles ==
·QLD State

·WBF Australasian

·WBC Continental

== Notable bouts ==
In 2016, Lovelock traveled to Tokyo, Japan, fighting Japanese World Champion Kyotaro Fujimoto.
