= Gökhan Saki =

Dutch kickboxer and mixed martial arts fighter

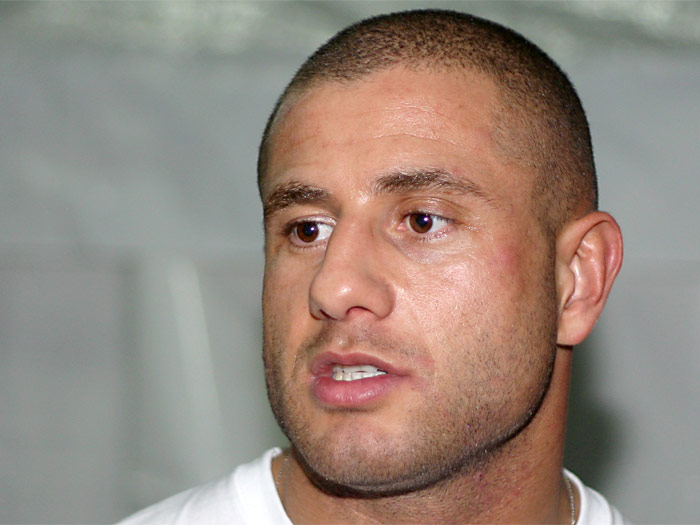
- Born: 18 October 1983 (age 43); Schiedam, Netherlands
- Other names: The Rebel; Turkish Tyson
- Height: 6 ft 0 in (1.83 m)
- Weight: 239 lb (108 kg; 17 st 1 lb)
- Division: Heavyweight; Light heavyweight
- Reach: 73 in (185 cm)
- Style: Kickboxing, Muay Thai
- Fighting out of: Kars, Turkey
- Team: Mike's Gym (2012–present); Golden Glory (2001–2012); Pasztjerik (1993–2001)
- Trainer: Mike Passenier; Cor Hemmers; Jan Pasztjerik
- Years active: 2000–2015, 2021 (Kickboxing); 2004, 2017–2018 (MMA)

Kickboxing record
- Total: 99
- Wins: 82
- By knockout: 59
- Losses: 16
- By knockout: 10
- Draws: 0
- No contests: 1

Mixed martial arts record
- Total: 3
- Wins: 1
- By knockout: 1
- Losses: 2
- By knockout: 2

Other information
- Mixed martial arts record from Sherdog
- Last updated on: 13 August 2015

Gökhan Saki (born 18 October 1983) is a Turkish-Dutch kickboxer and mixed martial artist. He is a Dutch, European and World Muay Thai champion, K-1 World GP 2006 in Amsterdam tournament finalist, K-1 World Grand Prix 2008 in Hawaii champion and former Glory Light Heavyweight Champion. Saki also competed in the light heavyweight division of the Ultimate Fighting Championship.

== Early life ==
Saki was born and raised in Schiedam, Netherlands. His parents were Turkish immigrants from Kars. Saki began training in kickboxing at the age of 10 when he also began playing football, but eventually quit football at the age of 16 because of his preference for kickboxing.

== Kickboxing career ==
His initial trainer was Jan Pasztjerik, under whom he became Dutch, European and World Muay Thai champion within three years, before moving to Golden Glory in 2003. In 2006, he returned to Pasztjerik as he embarked on a joint production with Golden Glory and Pasztjerik. Training at Golden Glory with Cor Hemmers, Saki became a well-known fighter as he took wins over André Tete, Vitali Akhramenko, Henriques Zowa and Alexey Ignashov. Apart from the aforementioned wins he also accumulated losses against well-established fighters such as Badr Hari and the Greek Nicholas Pettas.

=== 2006–2007 ===
Saki made his K-1 debut at the K-1 World Grand Prix 2006 in Amsterdam on 13 May 2006 where he defeated Rani Berbachi in the quarter-finals and Alexey Ignashov in the semis, before losing to Bjorn Bregy by first round knockout in tournament finals. Saki returned to K-1 in March the following year, taking on Hiromi Amada at the K-1 World Grand Prix 2007 in Yokohama and winning via technical knockout. On 23 June 2007, he defeated Mourad Bouzidi at the K-1 World Grand Prix 2007 in Amsterdam. He finished off the year by taking a victory over Russian muay Thai fighter Magomed Magomedov at K-1 Fighting Network Turkey 2007 in Istanbul on 2 November.

=== 2008 ===
On 16 February 2008, Saki won the World Full Contact Association (WFCA) World Thaiboxing Super Heavyweight (+95 kg) Championship by defeating Englishman Chris Knowles in his hometown of Schiedam. Following this, his next significant bout came in a super fight at the K-1 World Grand Prix 2008 in Amsterdam on 26 April where he knocked out Paul Slowinski.

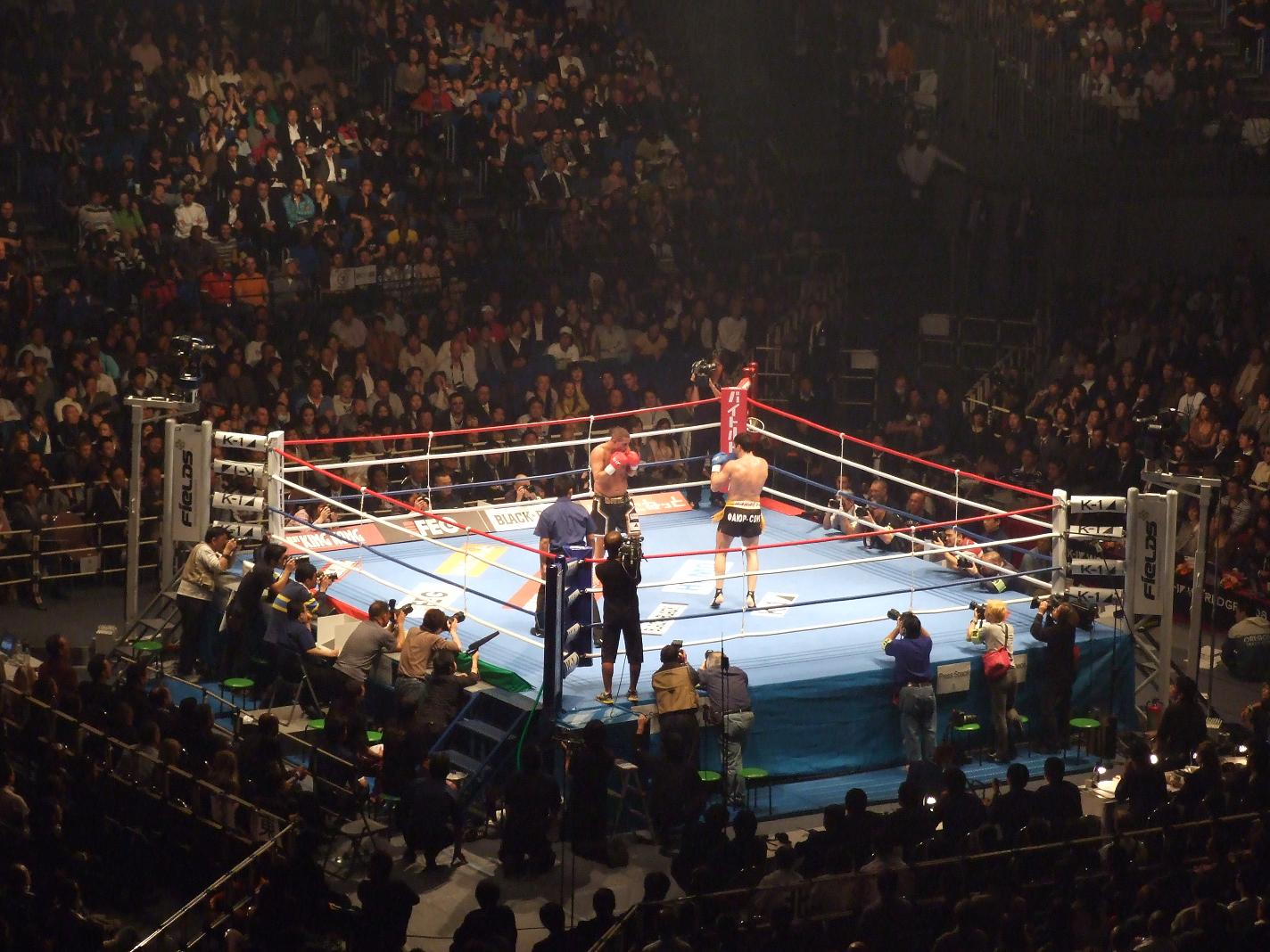
Saki facing Ruslan Karaev at the K-1 World GP 2008 Final

Following these victories, he was invited to take part in the sixteen-man tournament at the K-1 World Grand Prix 2008 in Hawaii on 9 August. Saki was able to win the tournament. This victory earned Saki a place in the 2008 K-1 World Grand Prix final sixteen.

Later that year at the K-1 World Grand Prix 2008 in Seoul Final 16 on 27 September, he was drawn against New Zealander Ray Sefo. After three rounds, the judges had scored the fight a decision draw so it went to an extra round to determine the winner, after which Saki was announced the victor by unanimous decision. Advancing to the final eight at the K-1 World Grand Prix 2008 Final on 6 December, Saki defeated Ruslan Karaev in the quarter-finals before being knocked out by the eventual champion, Remy Bonjasky, in the semis by a jumping kick to the rib cage.

=== 2009 ===
Gokhan Saki began 2009 with a defence of his WFCA World Thaiboxing Super Heavyweight Championship, finishing Germany's Arndt Bunk with a body shot on 28 February. A month later, he took part in the K-1 World Grand Prix 2009 in Yokohama, an eight-man tournament to determine the inaugural K-1 Heavyweight (−100kg) Champion. In the semi-finals, his fight with Tyrone Spong went into an extra round where he was able to win. In the final, he faced Keijiro Maeda in a bout which also went into an extra round. However, he lost via majority decision this time.

He returned against Pavel Zhuravlev on 2 August in a super fight at the K-1 World Grand Prix 2009 in Seoul. He lost the fight via unanimous decision and also injured his knee in the fight, which meant that he could not participate in the World Grand Prix last sixteen.

He was still able to take part in a reserve fight at the K-1 World Grand Prix 2009 Final, however, where he faced the Dutchman Peter Aerts. He was defeated via unanimous decision (30–27, 29–27, and 29–28), meaning that he had now lost three fights in a row.

=== 2010 ===
In early 2010, Saki was able to bounce back by taking two wins in January and February, including a defence of his WFCA Muay Thai title against Utley Meriana, before rejoining the K-1 circuit in April. He took a decision victory over Singh Jaideep at the K-1 World Grand Prix 2010 in Yokohama before taking on Melvin Manhoef in a highly anticipated bout at It's Showtime 2010 Amsterdam on 29 May. Saki won via TKO in the second round after the referee stopped the fight.

Having made a full recovery from his injuries and poor form, Saki was invited to the K-1 World Grand Prix 2010 in Seoul Final 16 on 2 October where he knocked out Frenchman Freddy Kemayo in the first round.

Following this, he entered the United Glory 2010/11 World Series at United Glory 12 fourteen days later where he KO'd Russian Nikolaj Falin in Amsterdam, Netherlands.

Saki then returned to Japan for the K-1 World Grand Prix 2010 Final on 11 December. He faced Daniel Ghiţă in the quarter-finals and won by unanimous decision after four rounds. However, he broke his right hand during the fight and went on to battle Golden Glory teammate Alistair Overeem in the semis. Alistair landed a heavy left kick to Saki's right elbow that was also broken in his quarter-final fight. The fight was a first-round TKO win for Overeem.

=== 2011 ===
After recuperating from the injuries he sustained in the K-1 Grand Prix, Saki returned to the United Glory World Series in March 2011 where he took a decision victory over Wendell Roche in the semis at United Glory 13. He then went on to win the World Series at United Glory 14: 2010–2011 World Series Finals on 28 May in Moscow, Russia where he defeated Brice Guidon by decision.

=== 2012 ===
On 28 January 2012, Saki faced Badr Hari at It's Showtime 2012 in Leeuwarden in what was to be Hari's last kickboxing match before moving into boxing. Hari defeated Saki with ease, scoring three knockdowns in the first round before the referee stopped the fight, earning him a TKO victory. He dropped him with a right uppercut first, the second knockdown came by a right hook. Finally, he landed a right uppercut again which dropped Saki for the third time.

When Saki's trainer, Cor Hemmers, took up a position working in the Glory promotion and was unable to spend as much time in the gym as before, Saki moved to Mike's Gym to train under Mike Passenier.

He faced Mourad Bouzidi at Glory 2: Brussels on 6 October 2012 in Brussels, Belgium and won by unanimous decision.

Saki ended the year by competing in the sixteen-man 2012 Glory Heavyweight Grand Slam at Glory 4: Tokyo – 2012 Heavyweight Grand Slam in Saitama, Japan on 31 December 2012. Saki defeated Raoumaru with ease at the opening stage, flooring the out-matched Korean twice in round one and forcing the referee to stop the bout. Then, in the quarter-finals, he knocked out Anderson "Braddock" Silva with his patented left hook in the closing seconds of round one. Advancing to the semis, Saki was eliminated by the eventual tournament winner, Semmy Schilt. Dwarfed by eleven inches and outweighed by twenty seven kilograms, Saki's high work rate was not enough to outpoint Schilt and he lost on points after the judges awarded the giant Dutchman the first two rounds.

=== 2013–2015 ===
Saki rematched Daniel Ghiţă at Glory 6: Istanbul in Istanbul, Turkey on 6 April 2013 in a #1 contender's bout for the Glory Heavyweight Championship held by Semmy Schilt. The fight started out a little rough, as Saki caught a kick from the Romanian. He then backed Ghiţă up and threw him to the mat with a sweep. Ghiţă landed hard, looking to have suffered an arm injury. According to Glory's official rules, leg sweeps and trips are illegal moves and should thusly be counted as such. Instead, referee Joop Ubeda counted it as a down as Ghiţă took a while to get to his feet. Even though injured, round two saw again Ghiţă being more consistent but midway through the round, the Dutch began landing heavy punches on him and simply did not let up, dropping durable Romanian three times to take a win via TKO after the referee stepped in, calling the fight.

In the semi-finals of Glory 11: Chicago – Heavyweight World Championship Tournament in Hoffman Estates, Illinois, United States in October 2013, Saki gave a lackluster performance and was on the receiving end of a controversial knockdown in round one as he lost a majority decision to eventual tournament champion Rico Verhoeven. On 2 November 2013, Saki released a statement declaring that he was looking into taking legal action against Glory over the decision.

Saki was crowned the inaugural Glory Light Heavyweight Champion when he won the Glory 15: Istanbul – Light Heavyweight World Championship Tournament in Istanbul, Turkey on 12 April 2014. He faced Nathan Corbett in the semi-finals and was beginning to punish the Australian's body when blood began to leak from Corbett's right ear after an overhand left to the organ, leading the ringside physician to advise referee Al Wichgers to halt the fight at the 2:35 mark of round one. He then faced Tyrone Spong in a highly anticipated rematch in the final. Midway through the opening round, Spong threw a kick to Saki's left leg. Saki checked the kick, causing Spong's lower right leg to fracture immediately and end the fight via TKO. Saki's sportsmanship of immediately tending to Spong was widely praised by the fans.

Saki was stripped of the Glory light heavyweight title due to inactivity in Glory on 27 July 2015.

=== 2021–present ===
On 8 October 2021 it was announced that Saki made his return to Glory with a single-fight contract. He was scheduled to replace Antonio Plazibat against James McSweeney at Glory: Collision 3 on October 23, 2021. Saki won the fight by second-round knockout.

== Mixed martial arts career ==
=== Early career ===
Early in his kickboxing career, Saki also had a MMA bout. He faced James Zikic on 11 July 2004 at Cage Fighting Championships 1: Cage Carnage. He lost the fight via TKO.

=== Ultimate Fighting Championship ===
On 25 May 2017, Saki announced he had signed a multi-fight deal with the Ultimate Fighting Championship. Saki made his promotional debut against Henrique da Silva on 23 September 2017 at UFC Fight Night: Saint Preux vs. Okami. He won the fight via knockout in the final seconds of the first round. This win earned Saki his first Performance of the Night bonus award.

Saki was expected to face Khalil Rountree on 30 December 2017 at UFC 219. However, he was forced to pull out, citing knee injury and was replaced by Michal Oleksiejczuk.

The bout against Rountree was then rescheduled and eventually took place at UFC 226 on 7 July 2018. Saki lost the fight via TKO in the first round.

Saki was scheduled to face Saparbek Safarov on 16 March 2019 at UFC on ESPN+ 5. However Saki pulled out of the fight in late February due to an undisclosed injury. Safarov remained on the card against a replacement, Nicolae Negumereanu.

On 8 February 2021, it was reported that Saki had been released from the UFC. Later, Saki clarified that he asked the UFC to let him go due to the multiple injuries sustained in mixed martial arts training.

== Personal life ==
Saki holds dual Dutch and Turkish nationality. He has stated that he respects Ramon Dekkers, and referred to Fedor Emelianenko as his favorite fighter.

== Championships and achievements ==
=== Kickboxing ===
- Glory
  - 2014 Glory Light Heavyweight Championship (inaugural)
  - 2014 Glory Light Heavyweight World Championship Tournament Champion
  - 2011 United Glory World Series heavyweight tournament champion
- K-1
  - 2010 K-1 World Grand Prix Final 3rd place
  - 2009 K-1 Heavyweight (−100 kg) tournament runner up
  - 2008 K-1 World Grand Prix Final 3rd place
  - 2008 K-1 World GP in Hawaii champion
  - 2006 K-1 World Grand Prix in Amsterdam runner up
- World Full Contact Association
  - 2008 WFCA World Thaiboxing Super Heavyweight (+95 kg) title
- Awards
  - 2014 Kickboxingplanet Kickboxer of the year
- Muay Thai
  - 2003 World Muay Thai champion
  - 2002 European Muay Thai champion
  - 2001 Dutch Muay Thai champion

=== Mixed martial arts ===
- Ultimate Fighting Championship
  - Performance of the Night (One time) vs. Henrique da Silva

== Kickboxing record ==
Kickboxing record (Incomplete)
82 Wins (59 (T)KOs, 23 decisions), 16 Losses, 1 NC
Date	Result	Opponent	Event	Location	Method	Round	Time
2021-10-23	Win	(United Kingdom) James McSweeney	Glory Collision 3	Arnhem, Netherlands	KO (low kicks)	2	
2015-04-17	Win	(Romania) Sebastian Ciobanu	GFC Fight Series 3	Dubai, UAE	Decision (Unanimous)	3	3:00
2014-04-12	Win	(Suriname) Tyrone Spong	Glory 15: Istanbul – Light Heavyweight World Championship Tournament, Final	Istanbul, Turkey	TKO (Leg injury)	1	1:37
Wins the Glory Light Heavyweight Championship and the Glory Light Heavyweight World Championship Tournament.
2014-04-12	Win	(Australia) Nathan Corbett	Glory 15: Istanbul – Light Heavyweight World Championship Tournament, Semi Finals	Istanbul, Turkey	TKO (Ear injury)	1	2:35
2013-10-12	Loss	(Netherlands) Rico Verhoeven	Glory 11: Chicago – Heavyweight World Championship Tournament, Semi Finals	Hoffman Estates, Illinois, USA	Decision (Majority)	3	3:00
2013-04-06	Win	(Romania) Daniel Ghiţă	Glory 6: Istanbul	Istanbul, Turkey	TKO (Punches)	2	1:26
2012-12-31	Loss	(Netherlands) Semmy Schilt	Glory 4: Tokyo – 2012 Heavyweight Grand Slam Tournament, Semi Finals	Saitama, Japan	Decision (Unanimous)	2	3:00
2012-12-31	Win	(Brazil) Anderson Silva	Glory 4: Tokyo – Heavyweight Grand Slam Tournament, Quarter Finals	Saitama, Japan	KO (Left hook)	1	2:00
2012-12-31	Win	(Japan) Raoumaru	Glory 4: Tokyo – Heavyweight Grand Slam Tournament, First Round	Saitama, Japan	TKO (Punches and Left high kick)	1	1:06
2012-10-06	Win	(Netherlands) Mourad Bouzidi	Glory 2: Brussels	Brussels, Belgium	Decision (Unanimous)	3	3:00
2012-05-26	Win	(United States) Carter Williams	Glory 1: Stockholm	Stockholm	KO (Left hook)	1	2:00
2012-01-28	Loss	(Morocco) Badr Hari	It's Showtime 2012 in Leeuwarden	Leeuwarden, Netherlands	TKO (3 Knockdowns Rule)	1	2:44
2011-05-28	Win	(France) Brice Guidon	United Glory 14, Final	Moscow, Russia	Decision (Unanimous)	3	3:00
Wins United Glory 2010–2011 World Series Tournament title.
2011-03-19	Win	(Curaçao) Wendell Roche	United Glory 13: 2010–2011 World Series Semifinals, Semi Finals	Charleroi, Belgium	Decision (Unanimous)	3	3:00
2010-12-11	Loss	(Netherlands) Alistair Overeem	K-1 World Grand Prix 2010 Final, Semi Finals	Tokyo, Japan	TKO (Arm injury)	1	2:20
2010-12-11	Win	(Romania) Daniel Ghiţă	K-1 World Grand Prix 2010 Final, Quarter Finals	Tokyo, Japan	Ext R. Decision (Unanimous)	4	3:00
2010-10-16	Win	(Russia) Nikolaj Falin	United Glory 12: 2010–2011 World Series Quarterfinals, Quarter Finals	Amsterdam, Netherlands	KO (Left hook to the body)	3	1:55
2010-10-02	Win	(France) Freddy Kemayo	K-1 World Grand Prix 2010 in Seoul Final 16	Seoul, South Korea	TKO (Punches)	1	2:14
2010-05-29	Win	(Netherlands) Melvin Manhoef	It's Showtime 2010 Amsterdam	Amsterdam, Netherlands	TKO (3 Knockdowns Rule)	2	1:55
2010-04-03	Win	(India) Singh Jaideep	K-1 World Grand Prix 2010 in Yokohama	Yokohama, Japan	Decision (Unanimous)	3	3:00
2010-02-27	Win	(Curaçao) Utley Meriana	K.O. Night in the Margriethal	Schiedam, Netherlands	KO (Straight right)	1	1:10
Retains WFCA World Thaiboxing Super Heavyweight (+95 kg) title.
2010-01-24	Win	(Netherlands) Dennis Stolzenbach	Muay Thai Mania II	Rijswijk, Netherlands	Decision (Unanimous)	3	3:00
2009-12-05	Loss	(Netherlands) Peter Aerts	K-1 World Grand Prix 2009 Final	Yokohama, Japan	Decision (Unanimous)	3	3:00
2009-08-02	Loss	(Ukraine) Pavel Zhuravlev	K-1 World Grand Prix 2009 in Seoul	Seoul, Republic of Korea	Decision (Unanimous)	3	3:00
2009-03-28	Loss	(Japan) Kyotaro	K-1 World GP 2009 in Yokohama	Yokohama, Japan	Ext R. Decision (Majority)	4	3:00
Fight was for K-1 Heavyweight (−100kg) title.
2009-03-28	Win	(Suriname) Tyrone Spong	K-1 World GP 2009 in Yokohama	Yokohama, Japan	KO (Right hook)	4	1:58
2009-02-28	Win	(Germany) Arndt Bunk	Ring Sensation Schiedam	Schiedam, Netherlands	KO (Left body shot)	1	2:18
Retains WFCA World Thaiboxing Super Heavyweight (+95 kg) title.
2008-12-06	Loss	(Netherlands) Remy Bonjasky	K-1 World GP 2008 Final	Yokohama, Japan	TKO (Ref. stoppage/Back injury)	2	0:53
2008-12-06	Win	(Russia) Ruslan Karaev	K-1 World GP 2008 Final	Yokohama, Japan	Decision (Unanimous)	3	3:00
2008-09-27	Win	(New Zealand) Ray Sefo	K-1 World GP 2008 Final 16	Seoul, South Korea	Ext R. Decision (Unanimous)	4	3:00
2008-08-09	Win	(South Korea) Randy Kim	K-1 World GP 2008 in Hawaii	Honolulu, Hawaii, USA	KO (Left hook)	2	1:39
Wins K-1 World GP 2008 in Hawaii championship.
2008-08-09	Win	(United States) Rick Cheek	K-1 World GP 2008 in Hawaii	Honolulu, Hawaii, USA	KO (Left body shot)	1	1:36
2008-08-09	Win	(United States) Deutsch Pu'u	K-1 World GP 2008 in Hawaii	Honolulu, Hawaii, USA	KO (Low kicks)	1	2:15
2008-05-31	Win	(Hungary) Iwan Dhaene	Beast of the East	Zutphen, Netherlands	KO (Left high kick)	1	0:45
2008-04-26	Win	(Australia) Paul Slowinski	K-1 World GP 2008 in Amsterdam	Amsterdam, Netherlands	KO (Left cross)	1	1:40
2008-03-15	Win	(Netherlands) Jantje Siersma	It's Showtime 75MAX Trophy 2008, Super Fight	's-Hertogenbosch, Netherlands	KO (Left overhand)	2	2:42
2008-02-16	Win	(United Kingdom) Chris Knowles	MM Thaibox Gala	Schiedam, Netherlands	TKO (Left low kick)	3	2:31
Wins WFCA World Thaiboxing Super Heavyweight (+95 kg) title.
2007-11-02	Win	(Russia) Magomed Magomedov	K-1 Fighting Network Turkey 2007	Istanbul, Turkey	Decision (Unanimous)	3	3:00
2007-07-29	Win	(Australia) J.Defer Illiadis	A-1 World Champions League	Istanbul, Turkey	KO (High kick)	1	0:44
2007-06-23	Win	(Netherlands) Mourad Bouzidi	K-1 World GP 2007 in Amsterdam	Amsterdam, Netherlands	Decision (Unanimous)	3	3:00
2007-05-20	Win	(Germany) Kevin Klinger	Ultimate Glory III	Amersfoort, Netherlands	TKO	1	0:40
2007-03-04	Win	(Japan) Hiromi Amada	K-1 World GP 2007 in Yokohama	Yokohama, Japan	TKO (Low kicks)	2	3:00
2007-02-17	Win	(Netherlands) Harry Hooft	Gala in Margriethal	Schiedam, Netherlands	KO (Left cross)	1	1:14
2006-05-18	Win	(Angola) Henriques Zowa	Gala in Vlaardingen	Vlaardingen, Netherlands	Decision (Unanimous)	5	3:00
2006-05-13	Loss	(Switzerland) Bjorn Bregy	K-1 World Grand Prix 2006 in Amsterdam	Amsterdam, Netherlands	KO (Left hook)	1	1:44
Fight was for K-1 World GP 2006 in Amsterdam title.
2006-05-13	Win	(Belarus) Alexey Ignashov	K-1 World Grand Prix 2006 in Amsterdam	Amsterdam, Netherlands	Decision (Unanimous)	3	3:00
2006-05-13	Win	(France) Rani Berbachi	K-1 World Grand Prix 2006 in Amsterdam	Amsterdam, Netherlands	Decision (Unanimous)	3	3:00
2005-10-08	Loss	(Greece) Nicholas Pettas	Bushido Europe "Rotterdam Rumble"	Rotterdam, Netherlands	TKO(leg injury)	2	N/A
2005-06-12	Win	(Belarus) Vitali Akhramenko	It's Showtime 2005 Amsterdam	Amsterdam, Netherlands	KO (Left low kick)	4	0:45
2005-03-26	Win	(Netherlands) André Tete	Night of the Explosion	Rotterdam, Netherlands	KO	N/A	N/A
2004-10-10	Loss	(Morocco) Badr Hari	2 Hot 2 Handle XVII	Rotterdam, Netherlands	TKO (Corner stoppage)	2	3:00
2003-10-11	Win	(Croatia) Daniel Leko	Muay Thai Gala Vlaardingen	Vlaardingen, Netherlands	KO	N/A	N/A
2003-04-20	Win	(Morocco) Karim Mrabet	Tulp Muay Thai Gala	Amsterdam, Netherlands	Decision	5	3:00
2003-01-11	Loss	(Morocco) Karim Mrabet	A Night To Remember	Hilversum, Netherlands	KO	1	3:00
2002-10-20	Loss	(Netherlands) Jacco de Jong	N/A	Dordrecht, Netherlands	KO	N/A	N/A
2002-09-08	NC	(Netherlands) Jeroen de Groot	Fighting Party	Rotterdam, Netherlands	NC	N/A	N/A
2002-03-30	Win	(France) Pierre Descendre	N/A	Vlaardingen, Netherlands	Decision	5	3:00
2002-02-03	Win	(Netherlands) Ed Schapner	WPKL Gala in Schuttersveld	Rotterdam, Netherlands	TKO	1	N/A
2000-09-03	Win	(Netherlands) Farrad Arslan	"Veselic Meets Dejpitak"	Arnhem, Netherlands	KO	3	N/A
Legend: Win Loss Draw/No contest Notes

== Mixed martial arts record ==
Professional record breakdown
3 matches	1 win	2 losses
By knockout	1	2

Res.	Record	Opponent	Method	Event	Date	Round	Time	Location	Notes
Loss	1–2	Khalil Rountree Jr.	TKO (punches)	UFC 226	July 7, 2018	1	1:36	Las Vegas, Nevada, United States	
Win	1–1	Henrique da Silva	KO (punch)	UFC Fight Night: Saint Preux vs. Okami	September 23, 2017	1	4:45	Saitama, Japan	Performance of the Night.
Loss	0–1	James Zikic	TKO (punches)	Cage Fighting Championships 1: Cage Carnage	July 11, 2004	N/A	N/A	Liverpool, England	

== See also ==
- List of K-1 events
- List of K-1 champions
- List of male kickboxers
