= Ewerton Teixeira =

Brazilian karateka

- Born: Ewerton Teixeira; February 13, 1982 (age 44); São Paulo, Brazil
- Height: 1.87 m (6 ft 2 in)
- Weight: 107 kg (236 lb; 16.8 st)
- Division: Heavyweight
- Reach: 70.0 in (178 cm)
- Team: Ichigeki Academy; Liberdade Dojo; Yoshida Dojo
- Trainer: Jayson Vemoa (K-1); Mauricio "Baboo" Da Silva (K-1); Hidehiko Yoshida; Ryuji; Tsutomu
- Rank: Third dan black belt in Kyokushin kaikan
- Years active: 16 (1999–present)

Kickboxing record
- Total: 15
- Wins: 11
- By knockout: 3
- Losses: 4
- By knockout: 1

Mixed martial arts record
- Total: 4
- Wins: 3
- By knockout: 1
- By decision: 2
- Losses: 1
- By submission: 1

Other information
- Mixed martial arts record from Sherdog
- Last updated on: December 21, 2013

Ewerton Teixeira (born February 13, 1982) is a Brazilian professional kickboxer, mixed martial artist, and Kyokushin Kaikan karateka. Teixeira obtained his first K-1 title in 2008 at K-1 World Grand Prix 2008 in Fukuoka by beating Keijiro Maeda in the final. He is training K-1 at the Ichigeki Academy Kyokushin Kaikan in Tokyo, Japan. Despite the short career for a kickboxer, Teixeira has notable wins against K-1 legends: Jerome Le Banner, Errol Zimmerman and Musashi.

== Career ==
After becoming the ninth Kyokushin World Champion in 2007, Teixeira entered K-1 in 2008. His first K-1 fight was against Japanese fan-favourite Yusuke Fujimoto. He won the fight by right cross KO. Teixeira then won the 2008 Japan GP after knocking out Tsutomu Takahagi in the first round followed by two unanimous decision wins over Tsuyoshi Nakasako and Keijiro Maeda.

He was then placed in the 2008 WGP eliminations against Japanese veteran Musashi. He won by unanimous decision and qualified for his first World Grand Prix championships.

In the quarter-finals, he fought his first non-Japanese opponent, Errol Zimmerman. Teixeira surprised the world by beating Zimmerman throughout the fight until he was dropped in the third round and ended up losing the fight by decision.

In Yokohama in March 2009, Teixeira beat Jerome Lebanner by decision in the 5th round. At the Final 16, despite being a big favourite and promising a KO against the new Asia champion, Sing Jaideep, he won a decision in the 5th round. In the finals he was knocked out by Alistair Overeem in round 1 after a knee to the chin.

In 2010, Teixeira fought K-1 World Grand Prix 2010 in Canberra as a super fight winning by KO over Alex Roberts. He then fought in K-1 World Grand Prix 2010 in Seoul Final 16 against Mr K-1 Peter Aerts losing a close bout in the extra round extension. The fight provided a defining moment to fans, finally proving that the Kyokushin fighter belonged in K-1.
Teixeira ended 2010 at the K-1 World Grand Prix 2010 Final as the Reserve match and once again surprised everyone by out classing Errol Zimmerman for a judges unanimous decision.

Texeira was waiting for engagement in K-1, but since there were no offers he decided to move to MMA, training with former UFC Heavyweight champion Junior dos Santos. He made his MMA debut on 23. Jun 2012, winning the fight via KO in round 3. Texeira said that he still wants to fight in K-1 if some bigger organisation offers the contract, but until then, he plans to fight under MMA rules.

He lost to Hesdy Gerges by unanimous decision at Glory 13: Tokyo - Welterweight World Championship Tournament in Tokyo, Japan on December 21, 2013.

== Titles and accomplishments ==
- Kickboxing
  - 2008 K-1 World GP in Fukuoka champion (defeated Keijiro Maeda in Final)
- Kyokushin
  - 2011 (silver) 2nd Place - 10th Kyokushin World Open Karate Tournament IKO 1 (lost to Tariel Nikosheivili)
  - 2011 5th Place - All American Open Karate Championships (lost to Shouki Arata)
  - 2007 (gold) 9th Kyokushin World Open Karate Tournament IKO 1 (Defeated Jan Soukup)
  - 2007 (gold) All American Open Karate Championships (Defeated Andrews Nakahara)
  - 2006 (silver) All American Open Karate Championships (lost to Andrews Nakahara)
  - 2005 (gold) 3rd Kyokushin World Weight Tournament Heavyweight (Defeated Lechi Kurbanov)
  - 2004 (gold) All American Open Karate Championships (Defeated Eduardo Tanaka)
  - 2003 (bronze) 8th Kyokushin World Open Karate Tournament IKO 1(lost to Hitoshi Kiyama/Defeated Glaube Feitosa)
  - 2003 (gold) All American Open Karate Championships (Defeated Sergey Osipov)
  - 2002 (gold) All American Open Karate Championships (Defeated Lechi Kurbanov)
  - 2002 (gold) 2nd World Team Cup (Defeats Russia)
  - 2001 (gold) All American Open Karate Championships (Defeated Kentaro Tanaka)
  - 2001 (silver) Brazilian Open (lost to Ulysses Isobe)
  - 2001 (silver) 2nd Kyokushin World Weight Tournament Heavyweight final 16
  - 2000 (gold) Paulista Championships
  - 2000 Brazilian Open Final 16

== Kickboxing record ==
Kickboxing Record
11 Wins (3 (T) KO's, 8 decisions), 4 Losses
Date	Result	Opponent	Event	Location	Method	Round	Time	Record
2013-12-21	Loss	(Netherlands) Hesdy Gerges	Glory 13: Tokyo	Tokyo, Japan	Decision (Unanimous)	3	3:00	11–4
2010-12-11	Win	(Curaçao) Errol Zimmerman	K-1 World Grand Prix 2010 Final	Tokyo, Japan	Decision (Unanimous)	3	3:00	11-3
2010-10-02	Loss	(Netherlands) Peter Aerts	K-1 World Grand Prix 2010 in Seoul Final 16	Seoul, Republic of Korea	Ext R. Decision (Unanimous)	4	3:00	10–3
2010-07-10	Win	(United States) Alex Roberts	K-1 World Grand Prix 2010 in Canberra	Canberra, Australia	TKO (Referee stop/three knockdowns)	1	2:00	10–2
2009-12-05	Loss	(Netherlands) Alistair Overeem	K-1 World Grand Prix 2009 Final, Quarterfinals	Yokohama, Japan	KO (knee)	1	1:06	9–2
2009-09-26	Win	(India) Singh Jaideep	K-1 World Grand Prix 2009 Final 16	Seoul, Republic of Korea	2 Ext R. Decision (Unanimous)	5	3:00	9–1
Qualifies for the K-1 World Grand Prix 2009 Final.
2009-03-28	Win	(France) Jerome Le Banner	K-1 World GP 2009 in Yokohama	Yokohama, Japan	2 Ext R. Decision (Split)	5	3:00	8–1
2008-12-06	Loss	(Curaçao) Errol Zimmerman	K-1 World Grand Prix 2008 Final, Quarterfinals	Yokohama, Japan	Decision (Majority)	3	3:00	7–1
2008-09-27	Win	(Japan) Musashi	K-1 World Grand Prix 2008 in Seoul Final 16	Seoul, Korea	Decision (Unanimous)	3	3:00	7–0
Qualifies for the K-1 World Grand Prix 2008 Final.
2008-06-29	Win	(Japan) Kyotaro	K-1 World GP 2008 in Fukuoka	Fukuoka, Japan	Decision (Unanimous)	3	3:00	6–0
Wins K-1 World GP 2008 in Fukuoka and qualifies for the K-1 World Grand Prix 2008 Final 16.
2008-06-29	Win	(Japan) Tsuyoshi Nakasako	K-1 World GP 2008 in Fukuoka	Fukuoka, Japan	Decision (Unanimous)	3	3:00	5–0
2008-06-29	Win	(Japan) Tsutomu Takahagi	K-1 World GP 2008 in Fukuoka	Fukuoka, Japan	KO (Knee strike)	1	2:18	4–0
2008-04-13	Win	(Japan) Yusuke Fujimoto	K-1 World GP 2008 in Yokohama	Yokohama, Japan	2 Ext R. KO (Right cross)	5	2:01	3–0
2004-05-30	Win	(Croatia) Petar Majstorovic	Kyokushin vs K-1 2004 All Out Battle	Tokyo, Japan	Decision	3	3:00	2–0
2003-02-22	Win	(Japan) Tatsuya Kato	Kyokushin vs K-1 2003 All Out Battle	Tokyo, Japan	Decision	3	3:00	1–0
Legend: Win Loss Draw/No contest Notes

== Mixed martial arts record ==
Professional record breakdown
4 matches	3 wins	1 loss
By knockout	1	0
By submission	0	1
By decision	2	0

Res.	Record	Opponent	Method	Event	Date	Round	Time	Location	Notes
Loss	3–1	Vinicius Queiroz	Submission (arm-triangle choke)	Bellator 143	September 25, 2015	2	4:00	Hidalgo, Texas, United States	
Win	3–0	Eduardo Pezao	Decision (Unanimous)	Imperium - MMA Pro 3	Apr 27, 2013	3	5:00	Salvador, Brazil	
Win	2–0	Edinaldo Novaes	Decision (Unanimous)	Imperium - MMA Pro 1	Jan 19, 2013	3	5:00	Salvador, Brazil	
Win	1–0	Raul Bazanes	KO (Knee)	CPMMAF - Champion Fights	Jun 23, 2012	3	0:50	Salvador, Brazil	MMA debut.

== See also ==
- List of K-1 events
- List of male kickboxers
