= Sylvester Terkay =

American professional wrestler (born 1970)

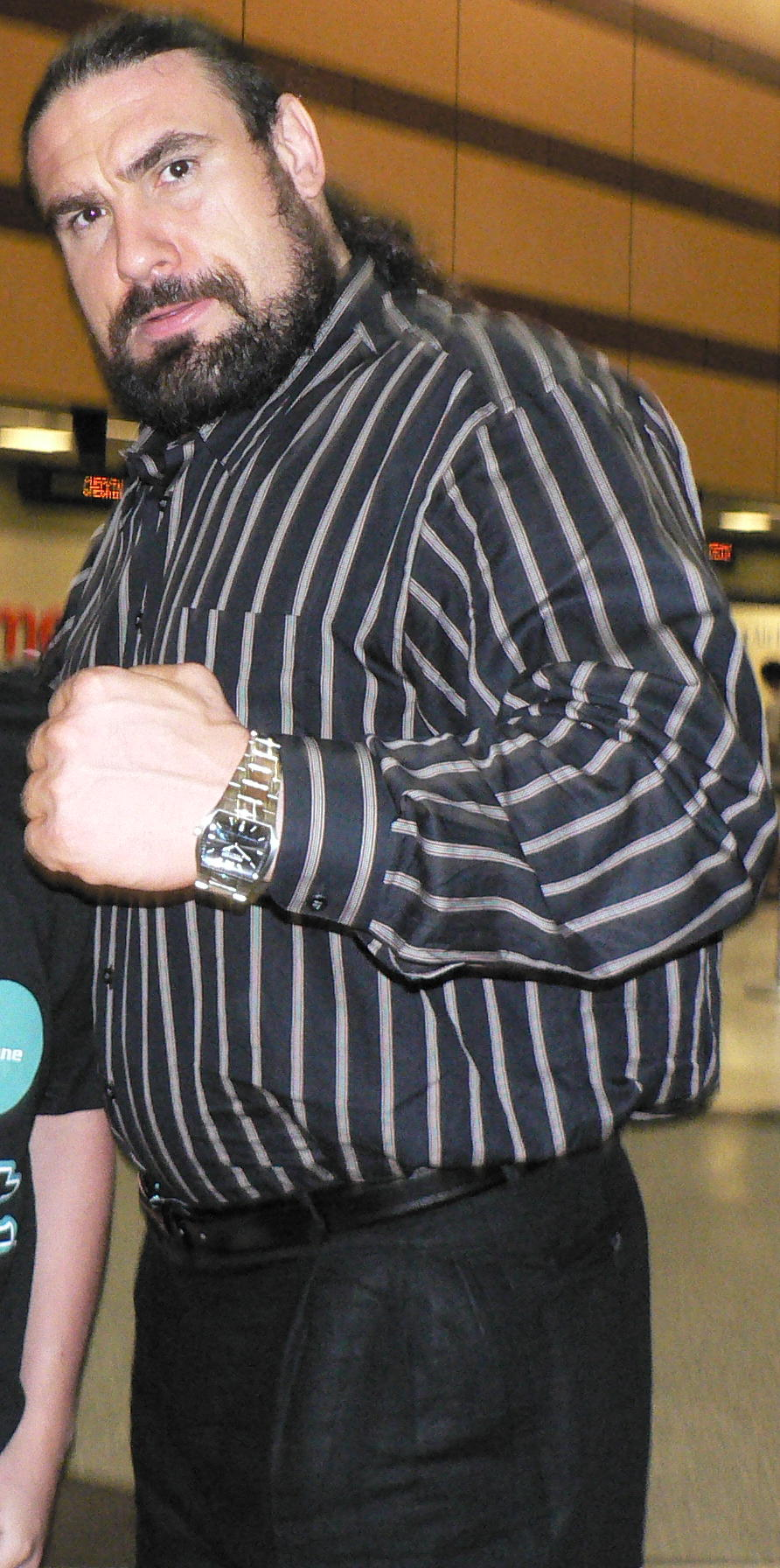
- Terkay in 2006

Personal information
- Born: Sylvester Matthew Terkay; December 4, 1970 (age 55) Washington, Pennsylvania, U.S.

Professional wrestling career
- Ring name(s): Big Van Vader UFO; Sylvester Terkay; Sly Scraper; The Collector; The Escapee; The Predator
- Billed height: 6 ft 6 in (1.98 m)
- Billed weight: 320 lb (150 kg)
- Billed from: Big Bear Lake, California
- Trained by: Ultimate Pro Wrestling; Ohio Valley Wrestling Rick Bassman
- Debut: 1999
- Retired: 2012

Medal record

Collegiate Wrestling

Representing the NC State Wolfpack

NCAA Division I Championships
Gold medal – first place	1993 Ames	275 lb
Silver medal – second place	1992 Oklahoma City	275 lb
Bronze medal – third place	1991 Iowa City	275 lb

ACC Championships
Gold medal – first place	1990 Clemson	275 lb
Gold medal – first place	1991 Chapel Hill	275 lb
Gold medal – first place	1992 Raleigh	275 lb
Gold medal – first place	1993 Durham	275 lb

Sylvester Matthew Terkay (born December 4, 1970) is an American retired professional wrestler, actor, and mixed martial artist best known for his run in WWE. He has held NWA Zero-One's United States Championship twice and Ultimate Pro Wrestling's first Heavyweight Champion.

== Early life ==
While attending North Carolina State University, Terkay was a member of the Wolfpack wrestling team. He won four consecutive ACC heavyweight wrestling championships (1990, 1991, 1992, and 1993). Terkay finished the season as a first-team All-American in each of his final three seasons. He finished second in the 1992 NCAA Division I Heavyweight tournament, losing to future Olympic gold medalist Kurt Angle by points, 3-2. In the 1993 season, Terkay posted an undefeated 41-0 record en route to the NCAA Heavyweight Wrestling title. Terkay was also a leader on the Wolfpack wrestling team, helping them to two ACC team titles, serving as team captain for his junior and senior years, and leading NC State to a then program-best 7th place team finish at the 1993 NCAA Division I Wrestling Championships. For his achievements, Terkay was inducted into the NC State Athletic Hall of Fame in 2013.

== Professional wrestling career ==
=== Early career (1999–2001) ===
After training under Rick Bassman's Ultimate Pro Wrestling school in California, Terkay was signed to a WWE developmental contract working for Ohio Valley Wrestling, but later released.

=== Pro Wrestling Zero1 (2001–2004) ===
Terkay joined Japanese pro wrestling promotion Pro Wrestling Zero1 in 2001 under the ring name "The Predator", patterned after Bruiser Brody's character. In July 2003. The Predator defeated Steve Corino in Niigata to win the Zero-One United States Heavyweight Championship. His reign ended the following month when he lost to Hulk Ogan in Nagoya. The Predator regained the title in October 2003 after Ogan vacated the title, defeating Mike Knox in Fukuoka. After successful title defenses against Jason the Legend, Tom Howard, and Hirotaka Yokoi, the Predator lost the title in July 2004, losing to Kohei Sato in a cage match in Korakuen Hall in Tokyo.

=== Ultimate Pro Wrestling (2001–2006) ===
In 2001, Terkay made his debut for Ultimate Pro Wrestling in California. He worked as The Predator.

=== World Wrestling Entertainment (2006–2007) ===
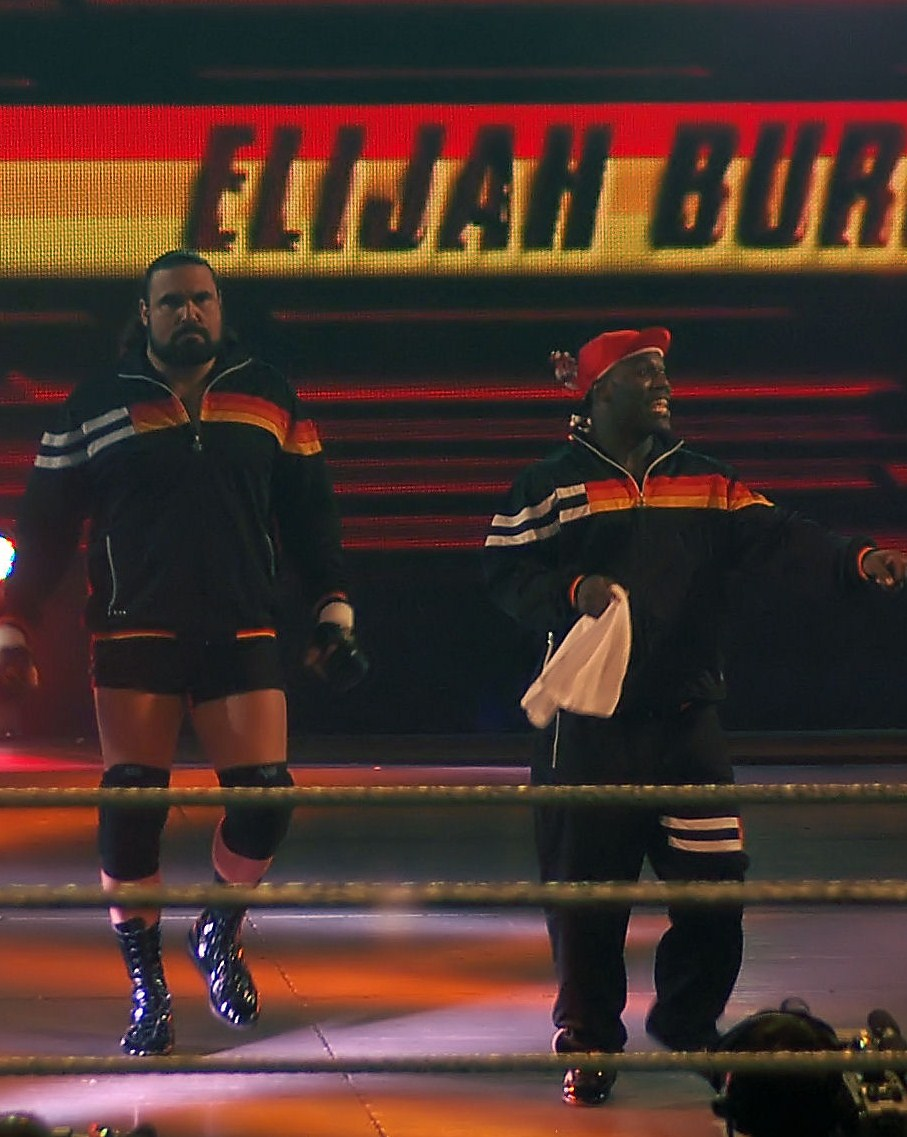
Terkay (left) with Elijah Burke at December to Dismember in 2006

After more training with WWE's Ohio Valley Wrestling (OVW) developmental territory, Terkay was brought up to the main roster of SmackDown! on July 28, 2006 working an MMA gimmick with Elijah Burke, who acted as his cornerman. Terkay defeated Matt Hardy in his debut match on SmackDown!. In the following weeks, Terkay dominated jobbers as well as later interfering in Burke's matches. On the October 20 episode of SmackDown!, Terkay helped Burke defeat Vito, breaking his 4-month undefeated streak. On the November 7, 2006 edition of WWE's ECW on Sci Fi, Terkay and his associate Elijah Burke debuted in ECW by doing a backstage promo. Their undefeated streak as a tag team was ended when The Hardys defeated them on ECW. At ECW's December To Dismember Terkay and Burke defeated The F.B.I. (Little Guido Maritato and Tony Mamaluke). In a backstage ECW promo Burke and Terkay dubbed themselves as the "Knock-out Tap-out Connection", a reference to Terkay's MMA and kickboxing background and Burke's amateur boxing background. He accompanied Burke to his matches in a bodyguard-type role for the next several weeks. Terkay remained undefeated in TV singles competition. On January 18, 2007, Terkay was released from his WWE contract.

=== Inoki Genome Federation / Pro Wrestling Zero1 and Later career (2007–2012) ===
After leaving the WWE, Terkay returned to wrestling for the Japanese promotions of Inoki Genome Federation (IGF) and Pro Wrestling Zero1 and wrestled under his alter ego The Predator. At IGF's Genome14, Terkay faced Keith Hanson in a match which ended after an angry Antonio Inoki legitimately came to ringside and shouted at both of them to stop.

On March 31, 2012 Terkay worked his last match which took place in Georgetown, Guyana for the WrestleRama event when he teamed with Paul Lee losing to Raven and Tom Howard.

== Mixed martial arts career ==
During his time in Zero1, Terkay also fought in several mixed martial arts (MMA) matches for K-1. He made his debut by knocking out his opponent Mauricio da Silva in 13 seconds as part of the annual K-1 New Year's Eve spectacular, K-1 Dynamite. He returned at the Romanex event in 2004, facing Ultimate Fighting Championship and PRIDE Fighting Championships veteran Gary Goodridge. Despite Terkay's size advantage, experience played in Goodridge's favor and he finished Sylvester in 1:22.

Also in 2004, however, Terkay defeated K-1 veteran Kristof Midoux, former trainer of Georges St-Pierre and Choi Mu-Bae, submitting him with a wrestling neck crank. This attracted a revenge match against Mu-Bae, which was won again by Terkay by unanimous decision in his last MMA venture. It was reported he had trouble getting fight contracts, as his lack of name value mixed with his good performances were seen as dangerous to established stars.

== Kickboxing career ==
In December 2005, Terkay made his kickboxing debut against Remy Bonjasky in K-1 Premium 2005, losing the match in a controversial unanimous decision. The normally polite Japanese audience booed heavily at this outcome, feeling Terkay was the true winner, and K-1 chairman Sadaharu Tanikawa agreed their opinion in the post-event press conference.

Terkay had his second and last kickboxing fight at K-1 Las Vegas, facing fellow superheavyweight Choi Hong-man, who came similarly from losing to Remy Bonjasky. Hong-man scored an early knockdown, but Terkay came back fast and fought a back and forth first round. The second round wasn't any different, with the Korean taking another point by knockdown and making Terkay bleed, only for Terkay to rally back and almost drop Choi down before the bell rang. At the third, Terkay controlled an exhausted Choi, harassing him with combinations against the ropes until the end of the match. The decision was given to Choi due to the points scored. As in the previous match, the audience booed the decision, again feeling that Terkay was the victor and that the score system did not do justice to the match.

== Post Retirement ==
As of November 2026, Terkay works as a Sales/Leasing Agent for South Hills Toyota dealership in Canonsburg, PA.

== Other media ==
Terkay has appeared in multiple films and TV shows over the years. He appeared in the 2001 movie Slammed along with former wrestling personality Zeus. He appeared on an episode of In the House as a Santa Imposter, and also appeared on the game show Distraction and bodyslammed contestants while they tried to answer questions. He made an appearance in the 2006 movie Evil Bong as a nightclub bouncer. He appeared in the 2010 movie True Legend as a fighter named Elder Scot Brother. He also appeared in the movie/documentary "101 Reasons Not To Be A Pro Wrestler", where he talked about his views on the wrestling business. In the 2014 film Pro Wrestlers vs Zombies, Terkay makes a cameo appearance as a zombie wrestler who fights Kurt Angle.

== Filmography ==
Film

Film
Year	Film	Role	Notes
1999	My Favorite Martian	Huge Guard	Movie
1999	Pros & Cons	Prison Guard	Movie
1999	Universal Soldier: The Return	Hospital Security Guard	Movie
2004	Slammed	The Goon	Movie
2005	101 Reasons Not to Be a Pro Wrestler	Himself / The Predator	Video documentary
2006	Evil Bong	Bouncer	Movie
2008	Muay Thai	Giant	Movie
2010	True Legend	Elder Scot Brother	Movie
2012	Extreme Rising	Mum	Movie
2014	Pro Wrestlers vs Zombies	Himself	Movie

Television

Television
Year	Title	Episode	Role	Notes
1994	Coach	"Coach for a Day: Part 2"	Walter	TV series
1995	In the House	"Christmas Story"	Santa	TV series
1996	The Parent 'Hood	"Substitute's Pet"	Burly Man	TV series
1996	The Bold and the Beautiful	"Episode #1.2378"	Harry	TV series
1999	Mad About You	"Separate Beds"	Amish Hellcat	TV series
1999	V.I.P.	"The Quick and the Dead"	Bruno	TV series
2000	Indie Wrestling School	N/A	Himself	TV movie
2001	Black Scorpion	"Fire and Brimstone" and "No Stone Unturned"	Granite	TV series

== Mixed martial arts record ==
Professional record breakdown
4 matches	3 wins	1 loss
By knockout	1	1
By submission	1	0
By decision	1	0

Res.	Record	Opponent	Method	Event	Date	Round	Time	Location	Notes
Win	3–1	Mu Bae Choi	Decision (unanimous)	K-1 HERO's - HERO's 2005 in Seoul	November 5, 2005	2	5:00	Seoul, South Korea	
Win	2–1	Kristof Midoux	Submission (neck crank)	K-1 - Premium 2004 Dynamite!!	December 31, 2004	1	1:11	Osaka, Japan	
Loss	1–1	Gary Goodridge	TKO (punches)	K-1 MMA - Romanex	May 22, 2004	1	1:22	Saitama, Japan	
Win	1–0	Mauricio da Silva	TKO (punches)	K-1 - Premium 2003 Dynamite!!	December 31, 2003	1	0:13	Nagoya, Japan	

== K-1 record ==
0 wins, 2 loss (2 decisions), 0 draws.
Result	Opponent	Method	Event	Date	Round, Time	Notes
Loss	Choi Hong-man	Decision (unanimous)	K-1 World Grand Prix 2006 in Las Vegas	04/29/06	3, 3:00	
Loss	Remy Bonjasky	Decision (majority)	K-1 Dynamite 2005	12/31/05	3, 3:00	

== Championships and accomplishments ==
=== Amateur wrestling ===
- National Collegiate Athletic Association

- 1993 NCAA Division I Champion
- 3-time Division I NCAA All-American
- 4-time ACC Champion

=== Professional wrestling ===
- Pro Wrestling Illustrated
  - Ranked No. 150 of the top 500 singles wrestlers in the PWI 500 in 2003
- Pro Wrestling Zero1
  - Zero-One United States Heavyweight Championship (2 times)
- Ultimate Pro Wrestling
  - UPW Heavyweight Championship (1 time, inaugural)
