= Cor Hemmers =

Dutch kickboxer trainer

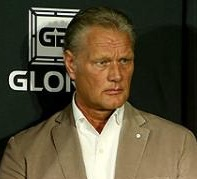
- Born: Cornelius Hemmers; August 24, 1956 (age 70); Breda, Netherlands
- Style: Kickboxing, Kyokushin Karate, Muay Thai, Judo
- Team: Maeng Ho/Hemmers Gym; Golden Glory

Kickboxing record
- Total: 29
- Wins: 25
- Losses: 3
- Draws: 1

Other information
- Notable students: Chalid Arrab, Ramon Dekkers, Heath Herring, Aziz Jahjah, Ruslan Karaev, Stefan Leko, Alistair Overeem, Bas Rutten, Gökhan Saki, Semmy Schilt, Errol Zimmerman,

Cornelius "Cor" Hemmers (born August 24, 1956) is a Dutch kickboxing trainer associated with the Golden Glory gym in Breda, Netherlands.

== Biography ==
Hemmers began his Martial Arts training in Judo at the age of 6, which he studied until the age of 15 when he switched to Kyokushin Karate. In 1976, Hemmers began competing in Full Contact Karate. During the 1980s, however, Kickboxing and Muay Thai became more popular in the Netherlands and Hemmers took this up. His professional Kickboxing record was 25 wins, 3 losses and 1 draw.

In 1984, Hemmers opened his own gym called Maeng Ho-Hemmers Gym and he later became the head trainer at the Golden Glory gym. Over the years, Hemmers trained many world champions in all categories in both kickboxing and mixed martial arts including Ramon Dekkers, Heath Herring, Stefan Leko, Alistair Overeem, Bas Rutten, Gökhan Saki, Semmy Schilt and Errol Zimmerman.

In 1990 Hemmers also started a Promotion Company called Oriental Fight Promotions in collaboration with business partners Bas Boon and Joop Musterd. With this company he promoted many Martial Arts events and co-produced exclusive pan-European TV programs for Screen Sport and Eurosport, among others.

In April 2012 Hemmers retired as a professional trainer and decided to continue his sports career as Head of Talent Operations and General Advisor with international Kickboxing promotion Glory (kickboxing). In 2016, he became the Managing Director Sports by GLORY Sports International.
