= Jaideep Singh =

Indian kickboxer and MMA fighter

- Born: 12 August 1987 (age 39); Punjab, India
- Height: 6 ft 6 in (198 cm)
- Weight: 233 lb (106 kg; 16 st 9 lb)
- Division: Heavyweight
- Style: Kickboxing
- Fighting out of: Tokyo, Japan

Kickboxing record
- Total: 51
- Wins: 40
- By knockout: 13
- Losses: 10
- By knockout: 2
- No contests: 1

Mixed martial arts record
- Total: 5
- Wins: 2
- By knockout: 2
- Losses: 3
- By knockout: 1
- By decision: 2

Other information
- Mixed martial arts record from Sherdog
- Last updated on: 29 May 2014

Jaideep Singh (born 12 August 1987) is an Indian heavyweight kickboxer and mixed martial artist. He is the K-1 World Grand Prix 2009 in Seoul tournament champion. His parents are both Indian and he was born in India, but moved to Japan with them when he was 3 years old.

== Kickboxing career ==
Jaideep faced Ismael Londt at the K-1 World Grand Prix 2012 in Tokyo final 16 on 14 October 2012 and lost via majority decision.

He was scheduled to fight Yong Soo Park at Glory 5: London on 23 March 2013 in London, England but Park was replaced by Daniel Sam. He lost by unanimous decision.

Jaideep was set to fight Anderson "Braddock" Silva at Glory 8: Tokyo - 2013 65kg Slam on 3 May 2013. The fight was cancelled.

He lost to Fatih Ulosoy via third round TKO at Global FC 3 in Dubai, UAE on 29 May 2014.

== Mixed martial arts career ==
Jaideep was scheduled to make his professional MMA debut for the Indian-based promotion Super Fight League at SFL10 against Mohamed Abdel Karim, but had to pull out of the fight due to injury. Jaideep was replaced by Jimmy Ambriz.

At SFL 16, it was announced that Jaideep signed a contract with the SFL and would be making his debut.

He debuted at SFL 19 on 7 June 2013 and TKO'd Alireza Tavak with elbows in round one.

He faced Fedor Emelianenko on 31 December 2015 in Japan under the Rizin Fighting Federation banner. Singh lost the fight via TKO in the first round.

== Championships and accomplishments ==
=== Kickboxing ===
- J-NETWORK
  - J-NETWORK Heavyweight Championship (2008-present: 2 defense)
- K-1
  - 2009 K-1 World Grand Prix in Seoul Champion
- RISE
  - 2011 RISE Heavyweight Tournament Champion

=== Mixed martial arts ===
- DEEP
  - DEEP Megatonweight Champion (1 Time, First)

== Kickboxing record ==
Kickboxing record (Incomplete)
40 Wins (13 (T)KO's, 27 decisions), 10 Losses (2 (T)KO's), 1 No Contest
Date	Result	Opponent	Event	Location	Method	Round	Time
2014-05-29	Loss	(Turkey) Fatih Ulusoy	Global FC 3	Dubai, UAE	TKO (Punches)	3	1:42
2013-03-23	Loss	(England) Daniel Sam	Glory 5: London	London, England	Decision (Unanimous)	3	3:00
2012-10-14	Loss	(Suriname) Ismael Londt	K-1 World Grand Prix 2012 in Tokyo final 16, First Round	Tokyo, Japan	Decision (Majority)	3	3:00
2011-11-23	Win	(Japan) Makoto Uehara	RISE 85: RISE Heavyweight Tournament 2011, Final	Tokyo, Japan	KO	1	0:38
Wins the RISE Heavyweight Tournament 2011 title.
2011-11-23	Win	(Japan) Raoumaru	RISE 85: RISE Heavyweight Tournament 2011, Semi Finals	Tokyo, Japan	KO (Knees)	1	1:39
2011-11-23	Win	(Japan) Hiromi Amada	RISE 85: RISE Heavyweight Tournament 2011, Quarter Finals	Tokyo, Japan	TKO (Doctor Stoppage)	1	2:59
2011-09-23	Win	(Japan) Tsutomu Takahagi	RISE 83	Tokyo, Japan	KO (Flying knee)	1	N/A
2011-07-02	Loss	(Albania) Xhavit Bajrami	K-1 MAX Switzerland 2011	Luzern, Switzerland	Decision (Unanimous)	5	3:00
For ISKA Heavyweight title.
2010-12-11	Win	(Russia) Sergei Kharitonov	K-1 World Grand Prix 2010 Final	Tokyo, Japan	KO (Right hook)	1	2:58
2010-08-22	Win	(Iran) Prince Ali	J-Network "Force for the Truth of J 4th"	Japan	KO (Knees)	2	1:08
Retains J-Network Heavyweight title.
2010-04-03	Loss	(Turkey) Gokhan Saki	K-1 World Grand Prix 2010 in Yokohama	Yokohama, Japan	Decision (Unanimous)	3	3:00
2009-12-05	Win	(Japan) Makoto Uehara	K-1 World Grand Prix 2009 Final	Yokohama, Japan	KO (Right hook)	2	1:36
2009-09-26	Loss	(Brazil) Ewerton Teixeira	K-1 World Grand Prix 2009 Final 16	Seoul, Republic of Korea	2 Ext R. Decision (Unanimous)	5	3:00
2009-08-02	Win	(Japan) Taiei Kin	K-1 World Grand Prix 2009 in Seoul	Seoul, Republic of Korea	Decision (Unanimous)	3	3:00
Wins K-1 World Grand Prix 2009 in Seoul championship.
2009-08-02	Win	(South Korea) Min Ho Song	K-1 World Grand Prix 2009 in Seoul	Seoul, Republic of Korea	KO (Right low kick)	1	2:45
2009-08-02	Win	(South Korea) Yong Soo Park	K-1 World Grand Prix 2009 in Seoul	Seoul, Republic of Korea	KO (Right hook)	2	1:35
2009-05-06	Win	(Japan) Koichi Watanabe	J-Network "Get Real in J-World 2nd"	Japan	Decision (Unanimous)	5	3:00
Retains J-Network Heavyweight title.
2008-11-30	Loss	(Brazil) Fabiano Aoki	Rise 51	Japan	Ext R. Decision (Unanimous)	4	3:00
2008-09-15	Win	(Japan) Yong	Titans Neos IV	Japan	TKO (Doctor Stoppage)	3	0:22
2008-04-11	Win	(Brazil) Fabiano Aoki	J-Network "Let's Kick with J the 2nd"	Japan	Decision (Unanimous)	5	3:00
Wins J-Network Heavyweight title.
2008-02-29	Win	(Iran) Prince Ali	J-Network "Let's Kick with J the 1st"	Japan	KO (Right knee)	2	2:05
2008-02-29	Win	(Japan) Tsutomu Takahagi	J-Network "Let's Kick with J the 1st"	Japan	KO (Right hook)	1	1:17
2007-12-16	Loss	(Brazil) Fabiano Aoki	Rise Dead or Alive tournament 07	Japan	KO (Right hook)	1	2:45
2007-08-26	Win	(Japan) Moriguti Riyu	Rise "The Face"	Japan	Decision (Unanimous)	3	3:00
2007-06-10	Win	(South Korea) Hui Yu	All Japan Kickboxing Federation "Kicks 7"	Japan	Decision (Unanimous)	3	3:00
2006-12-08	Win	(Japan) Katsunori Tanigawa	All Japan Kickboxing Federation "Fujiwara Festival 2006"	Japan	KO	1	1:48
Legend: Win Loss Draw/No contest Notes

== Grappling record ==
Grappling record
0 Win (0 submission, 0 points), 1 Loss (0 submission, 1 points)
Date	Result	Opponent	Event	Location	Method	Round	Time
2010-02-06	Loss	Hideki Sekine	DEEP X 05	Tokyo, Japan	Points (1–27)	2	4:00
Legend: Win Loss Draw/No contest Notes

== Mixed martial arts record ==
Professional record breakdown
5 matches	2 wins	3 losses
By knockout	2	1
By decision	0	2

Res.	Record	Opponent	Method	Event	Date	Round	Time	Location	Notes
Loss	2–3	Roque Martinez	Decision (unanimous)	Deep Cage Impact 2017: At Korakuen Hall	15 July 2017	3	5:00	Tokyo, Japan	Lost DEEP Megatonweight Championship.
Loss	2–2	Teodoras Aukstuolis	Decision (unanimous)	Rizin 1	17 April 2016	3	5:00	Nagoya, Japan	
Loss	2–1	Fedor Emelianenko	TKO (submission to punches)	Rizin World Grand Prix 2015: Part 1 - Saraba	31 December 2015	1	3:02	Saitama, Japan	
Win	2–0	Carlos Toyota	TKO (corner stoppage)	Deep - 73 Impact	17 October 2015	2	5:00	Tokyo, Japan	Won DEEP Megatonweight Championship.
Win	1–0	Alireza Tavak	TKO (elbows)	SFL 19	7 June 2013	1	4:24	Mumbai, India	

== See also ==
- List of K-1 events
- List of K-1 champions
- List of male kickboxers
