= Errol Zimmerman =

Dutch kickboxer

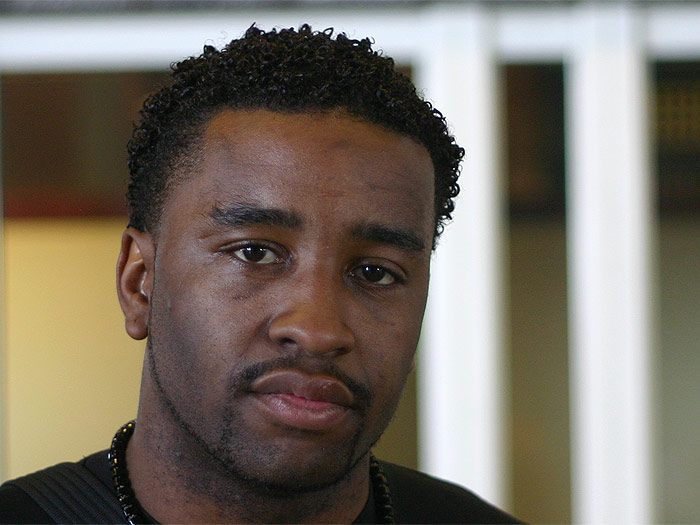
- Born: April 20, 1986 (age 40); Breda, Netherlands
- Other names: The Bonecrusher
- Height: 1.91 m (6 ft 3 in)
- Weight: 113.3 kg (250 lb; 17 st 12 lb)
- Division: Cruiserweight; Heavyweight
- Reach: 77.5 in (197 cm)
- Style: Muay Thai, Kickboxing
- Stance: Orthodox
- Fighting out of: Breda, Netherlands
- Team: Hemmers Gym (2012–present); Golden Glory (2005–2012); Meang Ho (2001–2004)
- Trainer: Nick Hemmers (2012–present); Cor Hemmers (2001–2012)
- Years active: 2001–present (Kickboxing); 2008, 2023, 2025 (MMA)

Kickboxing record
- Total: 119
- Wins: 87
- By knockout: 51
- Losses: 31
- By knockout: 15
- No contests: 1

Mixed martial arts record
- Total: 3
- Wins: 1
- By knockout: 1
- Losses: 2
- By submission: 2

Other information
- Mixed martial arts record from Sherdog
- Last updated on: June 13, 2024

Errol Zimmerman (born April 20, 1986) is a Curaçaoan-Dutch kickboxer and mixed martial artist, representing the Hemmers Gym in Breda, Netherlands. He is K-1 World Grand Prix 2008 in Amsterdam and SUPERKOMBAT Fight Club tournament champion. Zimmerman is also former Glory Heavyweight Championship and K-1 Super Heavyweight Championship challenger. In 2011 WIPU voted him the Kickboxer of the Year.

He has competed in the K-1, It's Showtime, SUPERKOMBAT and GLORY promotions and is currently signed to ONE Championship. Zimmerman has also competed in one Openweight mixed martial arts fight at K-1 Dynamite!! 2008 against the Japanese MMA icon Ikuhisa Minowa. Zimmerman lost the fight by a toe hold, a move that is rarely seen in MMA, to the submission specialist.

== Career ==
=== 2001–2005 ===
Zimmerman began training aged 12 and competing in kickboxing in 2001 at the age of 15. He competed in the under-85 kg division early in his career before moving up, eventually reaching heavyweight.

On January 19, 2005, he won the Dutch Muay Thai title at 86 kg when he knocked out Bas van den Muijsenberg in Tilburg. He then followed this up with a fairly successful showing at the K-1 Canarias 2005 eight-man tournament in Tenerife, Spain on April 2, 2005. After knocking out local fighter Mario Ostos in the quarter-finals and Cameroon's Eric Kouman in the semis, he was defeated by Henriques Zowa via unanimous decision in the final.

He was able to bounce back by defeating Mutlu Karbulut in his next fight at It's Showtime 2005 Amsterdam on June 12, 2005. He was then given the chance to rematch Henriques Zowa at It's Showtime 75MAX Trophy, 1st Round - Tilburg on October 17, 2005. He was able to avenge his loss to Zowa, defeating him by unanimous decision after five rounds.

He ended the year with a second-round knockout of Omar Bellahmar on December 17 in Maastricht, Netherlands.

=== 2006 ===
Zimmerman began 2006 with a knockout loss to Naoufal Benazzouz on March 5. Despite this, he was still invited to take part in the K-1 Scandinavia Grand Prix 2006 in Stockholm, Sweden on May 22. In the quarter-finals, he defeated Jonathan Gromark via technical knockout in the extra round. Then, in the semis, he lost to Magomed Magomedov by unanimous decision and was eliminated from the tournament.

Following a round one TKO win over Michiel Gerlach on June 3, Zimmerman returned to the Canary Islands for the K-1 Canarias 2006 on June 16. He was unable to get as far as the previous year, however, as he was defeated by Gregory Tony on points at the first stage.

Towards the end of the year, he was able to pick up two more wins. He KO'd Johan Mparpagiannis in the first round at the K-1 World MAX North European Qualification 2007 in Stockholm on November 27, and took revenge on Naoufal Benazzouz by TKOing him in Roosendaal, Netherlands on December 9.

=== 2007 ===
Zimmerman kicked off 2007 by knocking out Jerry Hofman in Amersfoort, Netherlands on January 21. He then recorded the two biggest wins of his career when he took decision wins over K-1 veterans Brecht Wallis and Petar Majstorovic. He defeated Wallis in the Netherlands on April 7, and then entered the eight-man tournament at K-1 Fighting Network Romania 2007 on May 4 to make his K-1 debut. In the quarter-finals, he beat Majstorovic via an extra round majority decision before going on to rematch Wallis in the semis. He was unable to reproduce his earlier performance, however, and lost a majority decision.

On June 6, he KO'd Gurkan Demirmenci in round one in Tilburg, Netherlands. Zimmerman then defeated veteran fighter Rodney Faverus by decision in Arnhem, the Netherlands on October 14. He finished 2007 by TKOing Kenan Akbulut on November 17.

=== 2008 ===
On January 21, Zimmerman knocked out Orlando Breijdenburg in the first round at Ultimate Glory 7 in Amersfoort, Netherlands.

Then, on February 9, he took part in the opening round of the K-1 Europe Grand Prix at the K-1 World Grand Prix 2008 in Budapest where he faced Damir Tovarovic of Croatia. After the referee gave Tovarovic two eight counts in the second round, Zimmerman forced the referee to stop the fight when he rocked him for a third time with a high kick.

After stopping an aging Rene Rooze at the It's Showtime 75MAX Trophy 2008 on March 15, Zimmerman advanced to the final eight of the Europe GP at the K-1 World Grand Prix 2008 in Amsterdam on April 26. Against Attila Karacs in the quarter-finals, Zimmerman was given the TKO win when Karacs could not continue due to a cut on his shin. He then went up against Björn Bregy in the semis and, despite being dominated by the huge Swiss fighter in the first round and dropped in the third, was able to knock him out with a flurry of punches at the end of round three. Advancing to the final against Zabit Samedov, he took a majority decision win after a hard-fought three rounds to become the K-1 European Champion and qualify for 2008 K-1 World Grand Prix.

At the K-1 World Grand Prix 2008 in Seoul Final 16 on September 27, he beat Brazilian karateka Glaube Feitosa by unanimous decision (30–26, 30–26, and 30–26) to qualify for the K-1 World Grand Prix 2008 Final in Yokohama, Japan on December 6. In the quarter-finals, he faced Ewerton Teixeira, another Brazilian karate fighter, and took a majority decision (27–27, 29–27, and 28–27) to win over him. Then he went up against Badr Hari in the semis and was knocked out with a right straight in the third round.

On December 31, he took on Ikuhisa Minowa, a Japanese catch wrestler known for fighting much larger opponents, in a mixed martial arts bout at the annual New Year's Eve martial arts event Dynamite!! 2008 in Saitama, Japan. Minowa was able to take Zimmerman to the ground and submit him with a toe hold just over a minute into the fight.

=== 2009 ===
2009 was a relatively poor year for Zimmerman, as he fought five matches, losing three and winning two. He returned on March 28 against Peter Aerts at the K-1 World GP 2009 in Yokohama. He was able to take the Dutch legend into an extra round but lost via unanimous decision.

He then went up against Mourad Bouzidi at It's Showtime 2009 Amsterdam on May 16. Bouzidi was given the win when referee Joop Ubeda stopped the bout due to a cut on Zimmerman's knee in the first round.

Due to his standing as one of the world's best heavyweights, he was invited to the 2009 K-1 World Grand Prix. At the K-1 World Grand Prix 2009 Final 16 in Seoul, South Korea on September 26, he rematched Glaube Feitosa. After three rounds of fighting, Zimmerman was named the winner via majority decision (29–28, 29–28, and 30–30) and qualified for the final eight.

Between the final sixteen and final eight, Zimmerman took a fight against Wendell Roche at Ultimate Glory 11: A Decade of Fights in Amsterdam on October 17. He won by unanimous decision after an extra round.

The K-1 World Grand Prix 2009 Final took place on December 5 in Yokohama, Japan. He was unable to advance past the first stage as he lost to three-time K-1 World Grand Prix champion Remy Bonjasky by unanimous decision (30–27, 30–28, and 29–28) at the quarter-final stage.

=== 2010 ===
On April 3, Zimmerman faced Golden Glory teammate Semmy Schilt for the K-1 Super Heavyweight Championship at the K-1 World Grand Prix 2010 in Yokohama. Although Zimmerman was able to find Schilt's chin on a few occasions, Schilt dominated the match and took a unanimous decision (30–27, 30–27, and 30–28) win to retain the title.

He returned to the winning column on May 21, taking only twenty-four seconds to demolish Romanian fans' favourite Cătălin Moroşanu at the K-1 World Grand Prix 2010 in Bucharest.

He returned to the K-1 World Grand Prix for the third time on October 2 when he faced Daniel Ghiţă at the K-1 World Grand Prix 2010 in Seoul Final 16. He did not qualify for the final eight this time, however, as Ghiţă knocked him out less than twenty seconds into the second round.

In a superfight at the K-1 World Grand Prix 2010 Final in Tokyo, Japan on December 11, he dropped a unanimous decision (30–28, 29–28, and 30–28) to Ewerton Teixeira to bring his tally for the year to 1–3. Zimmerman looked out of shape during the fight, evident from his chubby body and breathing heavy after the first round. Because of this and his inconsistency he dropped rapidly from the top 15 world heavyweight kickboxers.

=== 2011 ===
Zimmerman returned to form in 2011, going undefeated at 6–0 over the course of the year. On March 19, he demolished Zinedine Hameur-Lain in just over thirty seconds in a superfight at the United Glory 13: 2010–2011 World Series Semifinals in Charleroi, Belgium. He totally overwhelmed the Frenchman with kicks and punches, breaking Hameur-Lain's left arm in the process, and forced the referee to stop the fight.

Then, in another superfight at the United Glory 14: 2010–2011 World Series Finals on May 28 in Moscow, Russia, he avenged his 2009 loss to Mourad Bouzidi by taking a unanimous decision over him.

Continuing his run of form, he knocked out Nikolaj Falin inside the first fifteen seconds of the first round of their contest in Merseburg, Germany on August 28.

Zimmerman was expected to face Hesdy Gerges at the K-1 World Grand Prix 2011 in Nanjing Final 16 on October 29. However, the event was cancelled with K-1 experiencing severe financial problems.

Instead, Zimmerman took part in a one-night, eight-man tournament in Oradea, Romania at the SuperKombat: Fight Club event on November 17. He won the tournament in devastating fashion, finishing all three of his opponents. In the quarter-finals, he knocked Sebastian van Thielen cold with a right hook before stopping German veteran Stefan Leko in the semis by referee stoppage. In the final, he knocked out the overmatched Roman Kleibl with a high kick just seconds into the second round.

=== 2012 ===
He continued his impressive win streak into 2012 with a crushing knockout over Rico Verhoeven at It's Showtime 2012 in Leeuwarden on January 28. He took less than a minute of round one to finish Verhoeven with a deadly four-punch combination.

He then faced Jerome Lebanner at United Glory 15 on March 23, and again demolished his opponent in the first round. Many fans are now calling for a rematch between Errol Zimmerman and Daniel Ghita, this time for the IT's Showtime Heavyweight Title. Since he lost to Ewerton Teixeira, Zimmerman is now 8–0, with 7 knockouts, 6 of which have come within the first round.

However his impressive winning streak came to a stop when he lost in a rematch to Semmy Schilt. Zimmerman did have his moments, where he rocked his opponent multiple times, but his lack of mobility and head movement made him an easy target for the much taller Schilt. He lost the match when his corner threw in the towel in the third round.

He competed in the sixteen-man 2012 Glory Heavyweight Grand Slam at Glory 4: Tokyo - 2012 Heavyweight Grand Slam in Saitama, Japan on December 31, 2012, but surprisingly lost to the unfancied Jamal Ben Saddik at the opening stage. He was floored by Ben Saddik in rounds one and two, but also scored a knockdown of his own late in the second. Time ran out just as he was making a comeback, however, and, due to the tournament's "best of three" format, he lost a unanimous decision after two, two-minute rounds.

=== 2013 ===
He rematched Rico Verhoeven at Glory 9: New York - 2013 95kg Slam in New York City on June 22, 2013. Despite Verhoeven being deducted a point for rabbit punching in round one, Zimmerman was not able to take advantage and lost by unanimous decision after being outworked and outstruck for three rounds.

He TKO'd Hesdy Gerges in round three of the tournament reserve match at Glory 11: Chicago - Heavyweight World Championship Tournament in Hoffman Estates, Illinois, United States on October 12, 2013.

He was knocked out by Daniel Ghiță for the second time at Glory 13: Tokyo - Welterweight World Championship Tournament in Tokyo, Japan on December 21, 2013, succumbing to a left hook at the 0:35 mark of round one.

=== 2014 ===
He was initially set to face Ben Edwards in the main event of Glory 15: Istanbul in Istanbul, Turkey on 12 April 2014 but the match was transferred to the semi-finals of the Glory 16: Denver - Heavyweight Contendership Tournament in Broomfield, Colorado, US on May 3, 2014. He stopped Edwards in round one, scoring two knockdowns over the Australian, before giving an almost identical performance in the final against Anderson "Braddock" Silva as he knocked his Brazilian opponent down three times to win via another first-round TKO and take the tournament crown. Zimmerman stated in the post-fight press conference that he would have retired had he lost in the tournament.

=== 2015 ===
Zimmerman completed a trilogy of fights against Rico Verhoeven when he faced him on February 6, 2015, in the main event at Glory 19: Virginia. The anticipated bout ended in anticlimactic fashion as Zimmerman sustained a knee injury in the second round, allowing Verhoeven to retain his Heavyweight title.

Ten months later, Zimmerman fought Thomas Vanneste during Glory 26. Vanneste won the fight by split decision.

=== 2016 and 2017 ===
After this loss, Zimmerman left Glory and fought Viktor Bogutzki during Mix Fight Gala 20. He won the fight by a second round KO.

Errol then fought Murat Aygun for the WFL Heavyweight title, but lost the fight by decision. A month later, Zimmerman entered the A1 WCC Heawyweight Qualification Tournament. He beat Rinus Douma by decision in the semifinals, but lost to Adnan Redžović by KO in the finals.

Zimmerman then fought a rematch with Zabit Samedov, which he lost by unanimous decision. Zimmerman stopped the losing skid with a first round knockout of Luca Panto.

=== 2018 ===
Zimmerman fought twice in 2018. He lost a decision to Patrick Schmid in the A1WCC Champions League Heavyweight Tournament, and lost by KO to Nidal Bchiri during Enfusion 70.

=== 2020 ===
Zimmerman was scheduled to fight Rade Opačić at ONE: Big Bang 2, following a two year layoff. Zimmerman lost the fight by knockout in round 2, failing to beat the ten count after being knocked down by a spinning heel kick.

=== 2022 ===
Zimmerman broke another two year layoff by facing former KSW Heavyweight MMA Champion Marcin Różalski in a Kickboxing bout at KSW 71, on June 18, 2022. He won the bout via TKO in the second round, scoring four knockdowns to end the bout.

Zimmerman faced Tomáš Hron at Mega Fight Arena on December 9, 2022. He won the bout via TKO in the first round, finishing Hron with low kicks.

=== 2024 ===
Zimmerman broke a year and a half long hiatus by facing Michail Karamousketas at K-1 Fighting Network Romania 2024, on June 13, 2024. He won the bout via KO in the first round, finishing Karamousketas with low kicks.

Zimmerman faced Shota Yamaguchi at the K-1 World GP 2024 in Osaka, in a Qualifier bout for the K-1 World Grand Prix 2024 Final, on October 5, 2024. He won the bout via KO in the third round, dropping and stopping Yamaguchi with a right hook.

Zimmerman faced former K-1 Cruiserweight Champion K-JEE in the Quarterfinals of the World Grand Prix, on December 14, 2024. He won the bout via KO in the second round, dropping and stopping K-JEE with a left hook. Zimmerman next faced Ariel Machado in the Semifinals of the Grand Prix, losing via TKO in the second round, after being dropped twice in one round with leg kicks. Machado went on to win the tournament.

=== 2025 ===
Zimmerman returned to Glory to face former Australian powerlifting champion Alex Simon, in the co-main event of Glory Collision 8, on December 13, 2025, in a Qualifier bout for The Last Heavyweight Standing Tournament. This was to crown a new Glory Heavyweight Champion. Zimmerman won the bout via TKO, dropping Simon twice with punches. The bout was widely criticized, due to Simon's relative inexperience in combat sports compared to Errol, as Simon had only fought once in Kickboxing, having a 1–0 record, as well as two Mixed Martial Arts bouts, where he was 1–1, and three Boxing matches, where he was 1–2.

=== 2026 ===
Zimmerman faced Anis Bouzid at Glory 105, on February 7, 2026 in the Quarterfinals of the Last Heavyweight Standing Tournament. Despite hurting Bouzid with punches in the first round, Zimmerman was unable to drop Bouzid, nor was he able to capitalize on this early success, and lost a unanimous decision to the younger fighter.

Zimmerman faced former Glory Interim Heavyweight Champion Tariq Osaro at Glory 109, on September 5, 2026. He lost the bout via TKO in the second round, being dropped twice with punches in the first round, then again in the second round.

== Mixed martial arts career ==
Zimmerman made his mixed martial arts debut against Ikuhisa Minowa at Dynamite!! 2008 on December 31, 2008. He lost the bout via first-round submission.

His sophomore bout in the sport came almost fifteen years removed from the debut, against Tomasz Sarara at KSW 81: Bartosiński vs. Szczepaniak on April 22, 2023. He won the bout via second-round technical knockout.

Zimmerman returned to Mixed Martial Arts at KSW 105, on April 26, 2025. He faced former WBC World Heavyweight Boxing Title Challenger Artur Szpilka. In a wild bout, which saw both men rocking each other with punches, Szpilka would come out victorious, taking Errol down and submitting him with an arm-triangle choke in the first round.

== Personal life ==
Zimmerman was born and raised in Breda, the Netherlands to a Curaçaoan mother and a Surinamese father. He has two daughters and a son, who he named after his former trainer Ramon Dekkers.

== Titles ==
- A1 World Combat Cup
  - 2017 A1 WCC Heawyweight Qualification Tournament Runner Up
- Glory
  - 2014 Glory Heavyweight Contender Tournament Winner
- Muay Thai Bond Nederland
  - MTBN Dutch Muay Thai −86 kg Championship (2005)
- K-1
  - 2005 K-1 Canarias runner-up
  - 2008 K-1 World Grand Prix in Amsterdam Champion
  - 2008 K-1 World Grand Prix Final 3rd place
- SUPERKOMBAT Fighting Championship
  - SUPERKOMBAT Fight Club Tournament Champion (2011)
  - 2011 SUPERKOMBAT Knockout of the Year (vs. Roman Kleibl)
- World Independent Promoters Union (WIPU)
  - 2011 Kickboxer of the Year
- Kickboxing Romania Awards
  - 2024 Foreign Fighter of the Year

== Kickboxing record ==
Kickboxing record (Incomplete)
87 Wins (51 (T)KO's, 36 decisions), 30 Losses 1 No Contest
| Date | Result | Opponent | Event | Location | Method | Round | Time |
| 2026-09-05 | Loss | (Nigeria) Tariq Osaro | Glory 109 | Rotterdam, Netherlands | TKO (4 Knockdowns) | 2 | 1:54 |
| 2026-02-07 | Loss | (Morocco) Anis Bouzid | Glory 105 – Last Heavyweight Standing Finals Tournament, Quarterfinals | Arnhem, Netherlands | Decision (unanimous) | 3 | 3:00 |
| 2025-12-13 | Win | (Australia) Alex Simon | Glory Collision 8 | Arnhem, Netherlands | KO (Punches) | 1 | 1:18 |
Qualifies for Glory Last Heavyweight Standing Finals Tournament.
| 2024-12-14 | Loss | (Brazil) Ariel Machado | K-1 World Grand Prix 2024 Final, Semifinals | Tokyo, Japan | TKO (2 Knockdowns/low kicks) | 2 | 2:33 |
| 2024-12-14 | Win | (Japan) K-Jee | K-1 World Grand Prix 2024 Final, Quarterfinals | Tokyo, Japan | KO (Left hook) | 2 | 0:58 |
| 2024-10-05 | Win | (Japan) Shota Yamaguchi | K-1 World GP 2024 in Osaka | Osaka, Japan | KO (Right hook) | 3 | 1:14 |
Qualifies for K-1 World Grand Prix 2024 Final.
| 2024-06-13 | Win | (Greece) Michail Karamousketas | K-1 Fighting Network Romania 2024 | Galați, Romania | KO (Low kicks) | 1 | 1:43 |
| 2022-12-09 | Win | (Czech Republic) Tomáš Hron | Mega Fight Arena | Istanbul, Turkey | KO (Low kick) | 1 | 1:05 |
| 2022-06-18 | Win | (Poland) Marcin Rózalski | KSW 71 | Toruń, Poland | TKO (Punches) | 2 | 1:26 |
| 2020-12-04 | Loss | (Serbia) Rade Opačić | ONE Championship: Big Bang 2 | Singapore | KO (Spinning heel kick) | 2 | 1:35 |
| 2018-09-15 | Loss | (Morocco) Nidal Bchiri | Enfusion Live 70 | Belgium | KO (right hook) | 3 | N/A |
| 2018-05-05 | Loss | (Switzerland) Patrick Schmid | A1WCC Champions League Heavyweight Tournament – Quarter finals | Belgium | Decision (unanimous) | 3 | 3:00 |
| 2017-09-23 | Win | (Italy) Luca Panto | A1 World Combat Cup | Belgium | KO (left hook) | 1 | N/A |
| 2017-08-23 | Loss | (Azerbaijan) Zabit Samedov | Akhmat Fight Show | Grozny, Russia | Decision (unanimous) | 3 | 3:00 |
| 2017-05-13 | Loss | (Bosnia and Herzegovina) Adnan Redžović | A1 World Combat Cup, Final | Eindhoven, Netherlands | KO (Right hook) | 2 | |
For The A1 WCC Heawyweight Qualification Tournament Title.
| 2017-05-13 | Win | (Germany) Rinus Douma | A1 World Combat Cup, Semi Finals | Eindhoven, Netherlands | Decision | 3 | 3:00 |
| 2017-04-23 | Loss | (Turkey) Murat Aygun | WFL – Champion vs. Champion | Almere, Netherlands | Decision | 5 | 3:00 |
For the WFL Heavyweight Championship.
| 2016-12-03 | Win | (Germany) Viktor Bogutzki | Mix Fight Gala 20 | Frankfurt, Germany | KO | 2 | N/A |
| 2015-12-04 | Loss | (Belgium) Thomas Vanneste | Glory 26: Amsterdam | Amsterdam, Netherlands | Decision (split) | 3 | 3:00 |
| 2015-02-06 | Loss | (Netherlands) Rico Verhoeven | Glory 19: Virginia | Hampton, Virginia, United States | TKO (knee injury) | 2 | 2:17 |
For the Glory Heavyweight Championship.
| 2014-05-03 | Win | (Brazil) Anderson Silva | Glory 16: Denver – Heavyweight Contender Tournament, Final | Broomfield, Colorado, USA | TKO (right hook) | 1 | 2:30 |
Wins the Glory Heavyweight Contender Tournament.
| 2014-05-03 | Win | (Australia) Ben Edwards | Glory 16: Denver – Heavyweight Contender Tournament, Semi Finals | Broomfield, Colorado, USA | TKO (right hook) | 1 | 2:50 |
| 2013-12-21 | Loss | (Romania) Daniel Ghiță | Glory 13: Tokyo | Tokyo, Japan | KO (left hook) | 1 | 0:35 |
| 2013-10-12 | Win | (Netherlands) Hesdy Gerges | Glory 11: Chicago – Heavyweight World Championship Tournament, Reserve Fight | Hoffman Estates, Illinois, USA | TKO (right hook) | 3 | 0:38 |
| 2013-06-22 | Loss | (Netherlands) Rico Verhoeven | Glory 9: New York | New York City, New York, US | Decision (unanimous) | 3 | 3:00 |
| 2012-12-31 | Loss | (Morocco) Jamal Ben Saddik | Glory 4: Tokyo – Heavyweight Grand Slam Tournament, First Round | Saitama, Japan | Decision (unanimous) | 2 | 2:00 |
| 2012-05-26 | Loss | (Netherlands) Semmy Schilt | Glory 1: Stockholm | Stockholm, Sweden | TKO (corner stoppage) | 3 | 2:00 |
For the Glory Heavyweight Championship.
| 2012-03-23 | Win | (France) Jérôme Le Banner | United Glory 15 | Moscow, Russia | TKO (referee stoppage) | 1 | 2:21 |
| 2012-01-28 | Win | (Netherlands) Rico Verhoeven | It's Showtime 2012 in Leeuwarden | Leeuwarden, Netherlands | KO (left uppercut) | 1 | 0:59 |
| 2011-11-17 | Win | (Czech Republic) Roman Kleibl | SUPERKOMBAT Fight Club, Final | Oradea, Romania | KO (right high kick) | 2 | 0:08 |
Wins the SUPERKOMBAT Fight Club tournament title.
| 2011-11-17 | Win | (Germany) Stefan Leko | SUPERKOMBAT Fight Club, Semi Finals | Oradea, Romania | TKO (referee stoppage) | 1 | 0:58 |
| 2011-11-17 | Win | (Belgium) Sebastian van Thielen | SUPERKOMBAT Fight Club, Quarter Finals | Oradea, Romania | KO (right hook) | 1 | 1:30 |
| 2011-08-28 | Win | (Russia) Nikolaj Falin | 4. Merseburger Fight Night | Merseburg, Germany | KO (left hook) | 1 | 0:15 |
| 2011-05-28 | Win | (Tunisia) Mourad Bouzidi | United Glory 14: 2010–2011 World Series Finals | Moscow, Russia | Decision (unanimous) | 3 | 3:00 |
| 2011-03-19 | Win | (France) Zinedine Hameur-Lain | United Glory 13: 2010–2011 World Series Semifinals | Charleroi, Belgium | TKO (referee stoppage) | 1 | 0:33 |
| 2010-12-11 | Loss | (Brazil) Ewerton Teixeira | K-1 World Grand Prix 2010 Final | Tokyo, Japan | Decision (unanimous) | 3 | 3:00 |
| 2010-10-02 | Loss | (Romania) Daniel Ghiţă | K-1 World Grand Prix 2010 in Seoul Final 16 | Seoul, South Korea | KO (straight right) | 2 | 0:18 |
| 2010-05-21 | Win | (Romania) Cătălin Moroşanu | K-1 World Grand Prix 2010 in Bucharest | Bucharest, Romania | TKO (referee stoppage) | 1 | 0:24 |
| 2010-04-03 | Loss | (Netherlands) Semmy Schilt | K-1 World Grand Prix 2010 in Yokohama | Yokohama, Japan | Decision (unanimous) | 3 | 3:00 |
For K-1 Super Heavyweight Championship.
| 2009-12-05 | Loss | (Netherlands) Remy Bonjasky | K-1 World Grand Prix 2009 Final, Quarter Finals | Yokohama, Japan | Decision (unanimous) | 3 | 3:00 |
| 2009-10-17 | Win | (Curaçao) Wendell Roche | Ultimate Glory 11: A Decade of Fights | Amsterdam, Netherlands | Extra round decision (unanimous) | 4 | 3:00 |
| 2009-09-26 | Win | (Brazil) Glaube Feitosa | K-1 World Grand Prix 2009 Final 16 | Seoul, South Korea | Decision (majority) | 3 | 3:00 |
| 2009-05-16 | Loss | (Tunisia) Mourad Bouzidi | It's Showtime 2009 Amsterdam | Amsterdam, Netherlands | TKO (cut knee) | 1 | N/A |
| 2009-03-28 | Loss | (Netherlands) Peter Aerts | K-1 World Grand Prix 2009 in Yokohama | Yokohama, Japan | Extra round decision (unanimous) | 4 | 3:00 |
| 2008-12-06 | Loss | (Morocco) Badr Hari | K-1 World Grand Prix 2008 Final, Semi Finals | Yokohama, Japan | KO (straight punch) | 3 | 2:15 |
| 2008-12-06 | Win | (Brazil) Ewerton Teixeira | K-1 World Grand Prix 2008 Final, Quarter Finals | Yokohama, Japan | Decision (majority) | 3 | 3:00 |
| 2008-09-27 | Win | (Brazil) Glaube Feitosa | K-1 World Grand Prix 2008 in Seoul Final 16 | Seoul, South Korea | Decision (unanimous) | 3 | 3:00 |
| 2008-04-26 | Win | (Azerbaijan) Zabit Samedov | K-1 World Grand Prix 2008 in Amsterdam, Final | Amsterdam, Netherlands | Decision (majority) | 3 | 3:00 |
Wins K-1 World GP 2008 in Amsterdam tournament title.
| 2008-04-26 | Win | (Switzerland) Bjorn Bregy | K-1 World Grand Prix 2008 in Amsterdam, Semi Finals | Amsterdam, Netherlands | KO (punches) | 3 | 2:59 |
| 2008-04-26 | Win | (Hungary) Attila Karacs | K-1 World Grand Prix 2008 in Amsterdam, Quarter Finals | Amsterdam, Netherlands | TKO (leg injury) | 1 | 2:10 |
| 2008-03-15 | Win | (Netherlands) Rene Rooze | It's Showtime 75MAX Trophy 2008 | 's-Hertogenbosch, Netherlands | TKO (cut shin) | 2 | N/A |
| 2008-02-09 | Win | (Croatia) Damir Tovarovic | K-1 World Grand Prix 2008 in Budapest | Budapest, Hungary | KO (right high kick) | 2 | 2:32 |
| 2008-01-21 | Win | (Netherlands) Orlando Breijdenburg | Ultimate Glory 7 | Amersfoort, Netherlands | KO (right hook) | 1 | 2:36 |
| 2007-11-17 | Win | (Turkey) Kenan Akbulut | Ultimate Glory 6 | Ede, Netherlands | TKO | N/A | N/A |
| 2007-10-14 | Win | (Netherlands) Rodney Faverus | The Battle of Arnhem 6 | Arnhem, Netherlands | Decision | 5 | 3:00 |
| 2007-06-02 | Win | (Turkey) Gurkan Demirmenci | Gentlemen Promotions | Tilburg, Netherlands | KO | 1 | N/A |
| 2007-05-04 | Loss | (Belgium) Brecht Wallis | K-1 Fighting Network Romania 2007, Semi Finals | Bucharest, Romania | Decision (majority) | 3 | 3:00 |
| 2007-05-04 | Win | (Croatia) Petar Majstorović | K-1 Fighting Network Romania 2007, Quarter Finals | Bucharest, Romania | Extra round decision (majority) | 4 | 3:00 |
| 2007-04-07 | Win | (Belgium) Brecht Wallis | Balans Fight Night | Netherlands | Decision | 3 | 3:00 |
| 2007-01-21 | Win | (Germany) Jerry Hofman | Ultimate Glory 2 | Amersfoort, Netherlands | KO | 1 | N/A |
| 2006-12-09 | Win | (Morocco) Naoufal Benazzouz | Judgement Day | Roosendaal, Netherlands | TKO (punches) | 3 | N/A |
| 2006-11-27 | Win | (Sweden) Johan Mparpagiannis | K-1 World MAX North European Qualification 2007 | Stockholm, Sweden | KO | 1 | 2:02 |
| 2006-06-16 | Loss | (France) Gregory Tony | K-1 Canarias 2006, Quarter Finals | Tenerife, Spain | Decision (unanimous) | 3 | 3:00 |
| 2006-06-03 | Win | (Netherlands) Michiel Gerlach | Gentlemen Fight Night 3 | Tilburg, Netherlands | TKO | 1 | N/A |
| 2006-05-22 | Loss | (Russia) Magomed Magomedov | K-1 Scandinavia Grand Prix 2006, Semi Finals | Stockholm, Sweden | Decision (unanimous) | 3 | 3:00 |
| 2006-05-22 | Win | (Sweden) Jonathan Gromark | K-1 Scandinavia Grand Prix 2006, Quarter Finals | Stockholm, Sweden | TKO | 4 | N/A |
| 2006-03-05 | Loss | (Morocco) Naoufal Benazzouz | Future Battle | Bergen op Zoom, Netherlands | KO (right hook) | N/A | N/A |
| 2005-12-17 | Win | (Algeria) Omar Bellahmar | 2 Hot 2 Handle | Maastricht, Netherlands | KO | 2 | N/A |
| 2005-10-02 | Win | (Angola) Henriques Zowa | Gentlemen Fight Night 2 | Tilburg, Netherlands | Decision (unanimous) | 5 | 3:00 |
| 2005-06-12 | Win | (Turkey) Mutlu Karbulut | It's Showtime 2005 Amsterdam | Amsterdam, Netherlands | KO | 2 | N/A |
| 2005-04-02 | Loss | (Angola) Henriques Zowa | K-1 Canarias 2005, Final | Tenerife, Spain | Decision (unanimous) | 3 | 3:00 |
For K-1 Canarias 2005 tournament title.
| 2005-04-02 | Win | (Cameroon) Eric Kouman | K-1 Canarias 2005, Semi Finals | Tenerife, Spain | KO | 1 | N/A |
| 2005-04-02 | Win | (Spain) Mario Ostos | K-1 Canarias 2005, Quarter Finals | Tenerife, Spain | KO | 1 | N/A |
| 2005-03-19 | Win | (Netherlands) Bas van den Muijsenberg | Gentlemen Promotion | Tilburg, Netherlands | KO | N/A | N/A |
Wins MTBN Dutch Muay Thai −86kg Championship.
| 2004-11-26 | Win | (Czech Republic) Tomáš Hron | Kings of the Ring: Prestige Fights | Brno, Czech Republic | Decision (split) | 5 | 2:00 |
| 2004-07-11 | Win | (Netherlands) Jeroen de Groot | Cage Carnage | Liverpool, England | TKO | N/A | N/A |
| 2004-07-02 | Loss | (Czech Republic) Tomáš Hron | Kings of the Ring: World GP 85 kg, Semi Finals | Brno, Czech Republic | Decision (majority) | 3 | 3:00 |
| 2004-07-02 | Win | (Italy) Antonio Medelin | Kings of the Ring: World GP 85 kg, Quarter Finals | Brno, Czech Republic | KO (knee) | 2 | 1:20 |
| 2004-06-23 | NC | (Morocco) El Mourabit | Kickboxing Gala in Mons | Mons, Belgium | NC (broken arm) | 1 | N/A |
| 2003-04-26 | Win | (Denmark) Ali Chavoruh | Thaiboxing @ Sportcenter Inslag | Breda, Netherlands | KO | 2 | N/A |
| 2002-11-16 | Loss | (Netherlands) Frederico Chakuriki Gym | Kickboksgala, Sportcentrum "de Inslag" | Breda, Netherlands | KO (left hook) | 1 | N/A |
| 2002-05-25 | Loss | (Netherlands) Henko Kent | No Limits Tonight | Dommelen, Netherlands | KO | N/A | N/A |
| 2002-04-27 | Loss | (Suriname) Marlon Martis | Fight gala in Kunstijsbaan | Eindhoven, Netherlands | KO | 4 | N/A |
| 2002-04-06 | Win | (Iran) Alireza Moetaghari | Muay Thai & Mix Fight Gala | Rhoon, Netherlands | Decision | 5 | 2:00 |
| 2001-11-03 | Win | (Morocco) Khaled Ben Ali Gym | Breidushal | Amsterdam, Netherlands | Decision | 5 | 2:00 |
Legend: Win Loss Draw/No contest Notes

== Mixed martial arts record ==
Professional record breakdown
| 3 matches | 1 win | 2 losses |
| By knockout | 1 | 0 |
| By submission | 0 | 2 |

| Res. | Record | Opponent | Method | Event | Date | Round | Time | Location | Notes |
|---|---|---|---|---|---|---|---|---|---|
| Loss | 1–2 | Artur Szpilka | Submission (arm-triangle choke) | KSW 105 | April 26, 2025 | 1 | 1:49 | Gliwice, Poland | |
| Win | 1–1 | Tomasz Sarara | TKO (punches) | KSW 81 | April 22, 2023 | 2 | 3:53 | Tomaszów Mazowiecki, Poland | Heavyweight debut. |
| Loss | 0–1 | Ikuhisa Minowa | Submission (toe hold) | Dynamite!! 2008 | December 31, 2008 | 1 | 1:01 | Saitama, Japan | Openweight bout. |

== See also ==
- List of male kickboxers
- List of K-1 champions
