= Kyotaro Fujimoto =

Japanese boxer

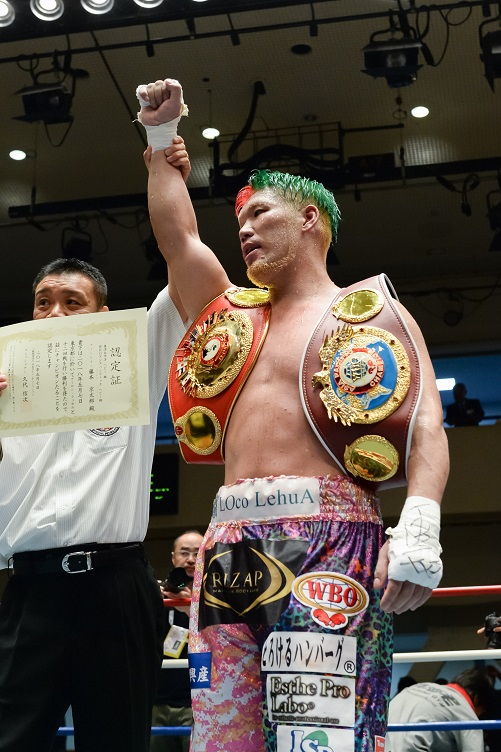
- Fujimoto in May 2018
- Born: June 23, 1986 (age 40); Osaka, Japan
- Native name: 藤本 京太郎
- Nationality: Japanese
- Height: 183 cm (6 ft 0 in)
- Weight: 102 kg (225 lb; 16 st 1 lb)
- Division: Heavyweight
- Reach: 73 in (185 cm)
- Style: Boxing, kickboxing
- Fighting out of: Tokyo, Japan
- Team: Team Dragon (2006–2010); Kadoebi Hoseki Gym (2011–present)
- Trainer: Kensaku Maeda (2006–2010); Hiroyuki Abe (2011–present)
- Years active: 2006–2011, 2021-present (Kickboxing); 2011–2020 (Boxing)

Professional boxing record
- Total: 23
- Wins: 21
- By knockout: 13
- Losses: 2
- By knockout: 2
- Draws: 0

Kickboxing record
- Total: 28
- Wins: 21
- By knockout: 11
- Losses: 7
- By knockout: 0

Other information
- Boxing record from BoxRec
- Last updated on: July 24, 2019

Kyotaro Fujimoto (藤本 京太郎 [ɸɯdʑimoto kʲoːtaɾoː], Fujimoto Kyōtarō; born June 23, 1986) is a Japanese former professional boxer who competed from 2011 to 2019 as a kickboxer. He resumed competing in professional kickboxing in 2021.

He is a former K-1 Heavyweight Champion and successfully defended his title against kickboxing star Peter Aerts at K-1 World Grand Prix 2010 in Yokohama. He was also a K-1 World Grand Prix 2008 in Fukuoka tournament finalist and the K-1 Young Japan GP 2007 champion.

== Early life ==
Fujimoto was born in Osaka, Japan, on June 23, 1986. He started learning the Uomoto-ryū (魚本流) school of karate as a child. His parents divorced in 1997, and he began to live with his sisters, mother, and grandmother.

== Kickboxing career ==
Kyotaro moved to Tokyo and joined Dragon Dojo established by Kensaku Maeda. He debuted on May 17, 2006, against Junichi Hanada.

Kyotaro entered the world of K-1 when he fought and won the K-1 Tryout 2007 Survival tournament in Tokyo by defeating Tatsunori Momose in the semi-final and Takumi Sato in the final, all by decision. This tournament was designed to showcase new talent. He then fought Kyoung Suk Kim during the opening fights at K-1 World Grand Prix 2007 in Seoul Final 16 defeating Kim by 2nd Round Knockout.

He further proved himself as a top K-1 contender by defeating the K-1 World Grand Prix 2004 in Las Vegas II and the K-1 World Grand Prix 2007 in Hawaii tournament champion Mighty Mo at K-1 World Grand Prix 2008 in Yokohama. Kyotaro was then invited to fight in the K-1 World GP 2008 in Fukuoka in which he became the runner up losing to Brazilian Karateka Ewerton Teixeira.

On March 28, 2009, Kyotaro won the K-1 Heavyweight (-100 kg) Title tournament by knocking out Melvin Manhoef in semifinals and beating Gokhan Saki in finals by extra round majority decision. Kyotaro became the second fighter after Badr Hari to win the title in K-1 Light Heavyweight division.

On December 5, 2009, he faced Tyrone Spong at the K-1 World Grand Prix 2009 Final and lost by unanimous decision.

Kyotaro defended his title against 3 time K-1 Grand Prix Champion Peter Aerts at K-1 World Grand Prix 2010 in Yokohama. Kyotaro knocked Aerts down twice at the end of the 1st Round and then knocked him out with his right hook in the 2nd Round.

At the K-1 Final 16 Kyotaro defeated another legend in Jerome Le Banner. Kyotaro withstood the Frenchman's early power to give him a severe beating in the 3rd round to earn a draw. Le Banner was angry at the decision and walked out of the ring, giving Kyotaro the win by DQ.

His next fight was at the K-1 World Grand Prix 2010 Final against 4-time defending champion Semmy Schilt. He was unable to faze his taller opponent, losing by unanimous decision.

He then chose to fight the DREAM (MMA) Light-heavyweight champion Gegard Mousasi. He was knocked down in the second round and again lost by unanimous decision.

In October 2011, Kyotaro relinquished the K-1 Heavyweight title in order to pursue a career in professional boxing.

=== Return to K-1 ===
In late 2020, Kyotaro announced he would be returning to kickboxing and is expected to compete at K’Festa 4 on January 24, 2021. He was scheduled to fight Kosuke Jitsutaka. The event was later rescheduled for March 31, 2021. He won his fight against Kosuke Jitsutaka by a second-round knockout.

Kyotaro was scheduled to face the K-1 Cruiserweight champion Sina Karimian at K-1 World GP 2021: Yokohamatsuri on September 20, 2021. Kyotaro lost the fight by split decision, after an extra round was fought.

Kyotaro was scheduled to face the J-Network heavyweight champion Hidenori Sakamoto at K-1 World GP 2022 Japan on February 27, 2022. Their fight was later postponed for K-1: K'Festa 5 on April 3, 2022, and was rescheduled as the quarterfinal bout of the 2022 K-1 openweight tournament. He won the fight by a second-round technical knockout and advanced to the tournament semifinals, where he faced Hisaki Kato. Sattari won the fight by majority decision, with scores of 29–29, 30–28 and 30–28.

Kyotaro faced the unbeaten Satoshi Ishii in a super heavyweight bout at K-1 World GP 2023: K'Festa 6 on March 12, 2023. He won the fight by unanimous decision, with two scorecards of 30–29 and one scorecard of 30–27.

== Boxing career ==
Kyotaro debuted as a pro boxer on December 31, 2011, when he took a unanimous decision win over Michael O'Donnell in Osaka, Japan. In September 2012, he defeated Chauncy Welliver by unanimous decision, who at the time was ranked #15 in the world by the WBC.

Kyotaro took Welliver's place in the WBC top 15 as a result of this win. Kyotaro lost his next fight against Solomon Haumono via TKO in the 5th round. The fight was held at Bodymaker Colosseum in Osaka on December 31, 2012. Kyotaro won his first major regional title against Willie Nasio for the vacant WBC - OPBF heavyweight title in 2017.

Kyotaro retired from professional boxing on November 12, 2020, announcing plans to go into mixed martial arts.

== Kickboxing titles ==
- Amateur
  - 18th All Japan Shin-Karate Championships(K-2 GRAND PRIX) Heavyweight(+75 kg) tournament winner (May 3, 2007)
- Professional
  - 2009-2011 K-1 Heavyweight (-100 kg) Champion (1 def.)
  - 2009 K-1 Heavyweight (-100 kg) Tournament Champion
  - 2008 K-1 Japan GP in Fukuoka Runner-up
  - 2007 K-1 Tryouts Young Japan GP champion

== Boxing titles ==
- Japanese heavyweight title (224 1/2Ibs)
- WBC - OPBF heavyweight title (227 1/4Ibs)
- WBO Asia Pacific heavyweight title (228 1/2Ibs)

== Awards ==
- 18th All Japan Shin-Karate Championship Gaora Award

== Ring names ==
- Kyōtarō Ranger (狂太郎レンジャー / May 2006 - August 2007)
- Kyōtarō Ranger (強太郎レンジャー / August 2007 - January 2008)
- Maeda Keijirō (前田 慶次郎 / January 2008 - August 2009) a.k.a. Keijiro Maeda
- Kyōtarō (京太郎 / August 2009 – December 2010)
- Kyotaro Fujimoto (藤本 京太郎 / December 2011–Present)

== Kickboxing record ==
Professional kickboxing record
21 Wins (11 (T) KO's, 8 decisions, 1 dq), 7 Losses
Date	Result	Opponent	Event	Location	Method	Round	Time	Record
2023-03-12	Win	(Croatia) Satoshi Ishii	K-1 World GP 2023: K'Festa 6	Tokyo, Japan	Decision (Unanimous)	3	3:00	21-7
2022-04-03	Loss	(Iran) Mahmoud Sattari	K-1: K'Festa 5, Tournament Semifinals	Tokyo, Japan	Decision (Majority)	3	3:00	20–7
2022-04-03	Win	(Japan) Hidenori Sakamoto	K-1: K'Festa 5, Tournament Quarterfinals	Tokyo, Japan	TKO (Referee stoppage)	2	2:11	20–6
2021-09-20	Loss	(Iran) Sina Karimian	K-1 World GP 2021: Yokohamatsuri	Yokohama, Japan	Ext. R. Decision (Split)	4	3:00	19–6
2021-03-28	Win	(Japan) Kosuke Jitsutaka	K’Festa 4	Tokyo, Japan	KO (Overhand Right)	2	0:29	19–5
2010-12-31	Loss	(Netherlands) Gegard Mousasi	Dynamite!! 2010	Saitama, Japan	Decision (Unanimous)	3	3:00	18–5
2010-12-11	Loss	(Netherlands) Semmy Schilt	K-1 World Grand Prix 2010 Final, Semi Finals	Tokyo, Japan	Decision (Unanimous)	3	3:00	18–4
2010-10-02	Win	(France) Jérôme Le Banner	K-1 World Grand Prix 2010 in Seoul Final 16	Seoul, South Korea	Forfeit	4	N/A	18–3
2010-04-03	Win	(Netherlands) Peter Aerts	K-1 World Grand Prix 2010 in Yokohama	Yokohama, Japan	KO (Right hook)	2	1:56	17–3
Fight for K-1 Heavyweight (-100kg) title.
2009-12-05	Loss	(Suriname) Tyrone Spong	K-1 World Grand Prix 2009 Final	Yokohama, Japan	Decision (Unanimous)	3	3:00	16–3
2009-09-26	Loss	(Russia) Ruslan Karaev	K-1 World Grand Prix 2009 Final 16	Seoul, Republic of Korea	Decision (Unanimous)	3	3:00	16–2
2009-08-11	Win	(Czech Republic) Jan Soukup	K-1 World Grand Prix 2009 in Tokyo Final 16 Qualifying GP	Tokyo, Japan	KO (Right hook)	3	1:20	16–1
2009-03-28	Win	(Turkey) Gökhan Saki	K-1 World GP 2009 in Yokohama	Yokohama, Japan	Ext R. Decision (Majority)	4	3:00	15–1
Wins K-1 Heavyweight (-100kg) title.
2009-03-28	Win	(Netherlands) Melvin Manhoef	K-1 World GP 2009 in Yokohama	Yokohama, Japan	KO (Right hook)	1	2:02	14–1
2008-09-27	Win	(South Korea) Min Ho Song	K-1 World GP 2008 Final 16	Seoul, Korea	KO (Punches)	3	1:43	13–1
2008-06-29	Loss	(Brazil) Ewerton Teixeira	K-1 World GP 2008 in Fukuoka Final	Fukuoka, Japan	Decision (Unanimous)	3	3:00	12–1
Fight was for K-1 World GP 2008 in Fukuoka title.
2008-06-29	Win	(Japan) Takumi Sato	K-1 World GP 2008 in Fukuoka	Fukuoka, Japan Semi-final	Decision (Unanimous)	3	3:00	12–0
2008-06-29	Win	(Japan) Musashi	K-1 World GP 2008 in Fukuoka Quarter-final	Fukuoka, Japan	Decision (Unanimous)	3	3:00	11–0
2008-04-13	Win	(United States) Mighty Mo	K-1 World Grand Prix 2008 in Yokohama	Yokohama, Japan	Ext R. Decision	4	3:00	10–0
2007-12-22	Win	(Japan) Tsuyoshi Nakasako	AJKF "Enter the Dragon The 1st"	Japan	KO	2	2:07	9–0
2007-09-29	Win	(South Korea) Kyoung Suk Kim	K-1 World Grand Prix 2007 in Seoul Final 16	Seoul, Korea	KO	2	2:14	8–0
2007-08-16	Win	(Japan) Takumi Sato	K-1 Tryout 2007 Survival K-1 Young Japan GP Final	Tokyo, Japan	Ext.R Decision (Unanimous)	4	3:00	7–0
Wins K-1 Tryout 2007 Survival title.
2007-08-16	Win	(Japan) Tatsunori Momose	K-1 Tryout 2007 Survival K-1 Young Japan GP Semi-final	Tokyo, Japan	Decision (Unanimous)	3	3:00	6–0
2007-06-03	Win	(Japan) Ryo Takigawa	J-Network "Team Dragon Quest 1"	Bunkyo, Tokyo, Japan	Decision (Unanimous)	3	3:00	5–0
2007-01-12	Win	(Japan) Tank Sugimura	MAJKF "Shidokan Spring New Year Event Breakdown-1"	Bunkyo, Tokyo, Japan	KO (Punches)	2	1:42	4–0
2006-11-05	Win	(Thailand) Turbo Weerasakreck	M-1 "M-1 Fairtex Shingha Beer Muay Thai Challenge -Thai King's Enthronement 60th Anniversary Cup 2006-"	Kōtō, Tokyo, Japan	TKO (Right low kick)	4	2:13	3–0
2006-09-01	Win	(Japan) Toshi Saenchai Gym	J-Network "Mach! Go! Go! '06 -Flyweight Strongest Decision Tournament 1st Match-	Bunkyo, Tokyo, Japan	Decision (Unanimous)	3	3:00	2–0
2006-05-17	Win	(Japan) Junichi Hanada	J-Network "Go! Go! J-Net '06 -Invading the Dragon-	Bunkyo, Tokyo, Japan	KO	2	1:16	1–0
Legend: Win Loss Draw/No contest Notes

Amateur kickboxing record
Date	Result	Opponent	Event	Location	Method	Round	Time
2007-05-03	Win	(Japan) Jun'ichi Kikuchi	18th K-2 GRAND PRIX Heavyweight tournament Final	Adachi, Tokyo, Japan	Ippon (Awasete)	1	N/A
Legend: Win Loss Draw/No contest Notes

== Professional boxing record ==
23 fights	21 wins	2 losses
By knockout	13	2
By decision	8	0

No.	Result	Record	Opponent	Type	Round, time	Date	Location	Notes
23	Loss	21–2	Daniel Dubois	KO	2 (12), 2:10	21 Dec 2019	Copper Box Arena, London, England	For WBO International and vacant WBC Silver heavyweight titles
22	Win	21–1	Suthat Kalalek	TKO	6 (8), 2:08	21 Oct 2019	Korakuen Hall, Tokyo, Japan	
21	Win	20–1	Suthat Kalalek	RTD	6 (12), 3:00	25 Sep 2018	Korakuen Hall, Tokyo, Japan	Retained OPBF and WBO Asia Pacific heavyweight titles
20	Win	19–1	Aaron Russell	TKO	7 (12), 0:28	7 May 2018	Korakuen Hall, Tokyo, Japan	Retained OPBF and WBO Asia Pacific heavyweight titles
19	Win	18–1	Randall Rayment	KO	5 (12), 2:50	4 Nov 2017	Korakuen Hall, Tokyo, Japan	Retained OPBF and WBO Asia Pacific heavyweight titles
18	Win	17–1	Herman Ene Purcell	TKO	9 (12), 1:22	9 May 2017	Korakuen Hall, Tokyo, Japan	Retained OPBF Heavyweight title Won vacant WBO Asia Pacific heavyweight title
17	Win	16–1	Willie Nasio	UD	12	14 Jan 2017	Korakuen Hall, Tokyo, Japan	Won vacant OPBF heavyweight title
16	Win	15–1	Adam Lovelock	TKO	2 (8), 2:13	2 Aug 2016	Shinjuku FACE, Tokyo, Japan	
15	Win	14–1	Nathan McKay	UD	8	2 Aug 2016	Ota City General Gymnasium, Tokyo, Japan	
14	Win	13–1	David Torres Garcia	KO	3 (8), 1:05	21 Oct 2015	Korakuen Hall, Tokyo, Japan	
13	Win	12–1	Nobuhiro Ishida	SD	10	30 Apr 2015	Korakuen Hall, Tokyo, Japan	Retained Japanese heavyweight title
12	Win	11–1	David Radeff	UD	8	18 Dec 2014	Korakuen Hall, Tokyo, Japan	
11	Win	10–1	Kotatsu Takehara	TKO	5 (10), 0:44	10 Sep 2014	Korakuen Hall, Tokyo, Japan	Retained Japanese heavyweight title
10	Win	9–1	Nobuhiro Ishida	UD	8	30 Apr 2014	Korakuen Hall, Tokyo, Japan	
9	Win	8–1	Kotatsu Takehara	UD	8	25 Nov 2013	Korakuen Hall, Tokyo, Japan	Retained Japanese heavyweight title
8	Win	7–1	Okello Peter	TKO	6 (10), 2:59	23 Jul 2013	Korakuen Hall, Tokyo, Japan	Won vacant Japanese heavyweight title
7	Win	6–1	Fabrice Aurieng	TKO	7 (8), 1:11	17 Apr 2013	Korakuen Hall, Tokyo, Japan	
6	Loss	5–1	Solomon Haumono	TKO	5 (12), 0:57	31 Dec 2012	Bodymaker Colosseum, Osaka, Japan	For vacant OPBF heavyweight title
5	Win	5–0	Chauncy Welliver	UD	10	19 Sep 2012	Korakuen Hall, Tokyo, Japan	
4	Win	4–0	Clarence Tillman	KO	3 (8), 0:47	20 Jun 2012	Osaka Prefectural Gymnasium, Osaka, Japan	
3	Win	3–0	Afa Tatupu	TKO	2 (6), 0:47	17 May 2012	Korakuen Hall, Tokyo, Japan	
2	Win	2–0	Jae-Chan Kim	TKO	2 (6), 1:03	6 Mar 2012	Korakuen Hall, Tokyo, Tokyo	
1	Win	1–0	Michael O'Donnell	UD	6	31 Dec 2011	Osaka Prefectural Gymnasium, Osaka, Japan	
