= K-1 World Grand Prix 2010 Final =

K-1 martial arts event in 2010

- The poster for K-1 World Grand Prix 2010 Final
- Promotion: K-1
- Date: December 11, 2010
- Venue: Ariake Coliseum
- City: Tokyo, Japan
- Attendance: 11,835

Event chronology
K-1 Scandinavia Rumble of the Kings 2010	K-1 World Grand Prix 2010 Final	KOK World GP 2010 in Chisinau

K-1 World Grand Prix 2010 Final was a martial arts event that was held by the K-1 on Saturday, December 11, 2010. It was the 18th K-1 World GP Final, the culmination of a year full of regional elimination tournaments. All fights followed K-1's classic tournament format and were conducted under K-1 Rules, three rounds of three minutes each, with a possible tiebreaker. The qualification for the top eight fighters was held at the K-1 World Grand Prix 2010 in Seoul Final 16 on October 2, 2010 in Seoul, Korea.

== K-1 World Grand Prix 2010 Final bracket ==
Final 16
(United States) Mighty Mo	DEC
(Romania) Raul Cătinaș	3r.
(Brazil) Ewerton Teixeira	4r.
(Netherlands) Peter Aerts	DEC
(Netherlands) Semmy Schilt	DEC
(Egypt) Hesdy Gerges	3r.
(France) Jerome Le Banner	4r.
(Japan) Kyotaro	DQ
(Turkey) Gökhan Saki	KO
(France) Freddy Kemayo	1r.
(Netherlands) Errol Zimmerman	2r.
(Romania) Daniel Ghiță	KO
(Netherlands) Alistair Overeem	KO
(Australia) Ben Edwards	1r.
(New Zealand) Ray Sefo	3r.
(Suriname) Tyrone Spong	DEC

Quarter Finals
(United States) Mighty Mo	1r.
(Netherlands) Peter Aerts	KO
(Netherlands) Semmy Schilt	DEC
(Japan) Kyotaro	3r.
(Turkey) Gökhan Saki	DEC
(Romania) Daniel Ghiță	4r.
(Netherlands) Alistair Overeem	DEC
(Suriname) Tyrone Spong	3r.

Semi Finals
(Netherlands) Peter Aerts	DEC
(Netherlands) Semmy Schilt	3r.
(Turkey) Gökhan Saki	1r.
(Netherlands) Alistair Overeem	TKO

Final
(Netherlands) Peter Aerts	1r.
(Netherlands) Alistair Overeem	KO

== Results ==
K-1 World GP 2010 Final 8 results
Opening Fight: K-1 rules / 3Min. 3R
(Japan) Tsutomu Takahagi vs Hidekazu Kimura (Japan)
Takahagi defeated Kimura by 3 round unanimous decision 3-0 (30-27, 30-27, 30-27).
Reserve Fight: K-1 rules / 3Min. 3R Ext. 1R
(Brazil) Ewerton Teixeira vs Errol Zimmerman (Netherlands)
Teixeira defeated Zimmerman by 3 round unanimous decision 3-0 (30-28, 29-28, 30-28).
Quarter finals: K-1 rules / 3Min. 3R Ext. 1R
(United States) Mighty Mo vs Peter Aerts (Netherlands)
Aerts defeated Mo by KO (2 knockdown, Punch Rush) at 2:20 of the 1st round.
(Netherlands) Semmy Schilt vs Kyotaro (Japan)
Schilt defeated Kyotaro by 3 round unanimous decision 3-0 (30-27, 30-27, 30-28).
(Turkey) Gokhan Saki vs Daniel Ghiță (Romania)
Saki defeated Ghiţă by unanimous decision after an extra round 3-0 (10-9, 10-9, 10-9). After 3 round judges had it a majority draw 1-0 (30-30, 29-30, 30-30) in favor of Ghiţă.
(Netherlands) Alistair Overeem vs Tyrone Spong (Suriname)
Overeem defeated Spong by 3 round unanimous decision 3-0 (29-27, 29-28, 29-27).
Super Fight (1) Fujimoto's Retirement Fight: K-1 rules / 3Min. 3R Ext. 1R
(Egypt) Hesdy Gerges vs Yusuke Fujimoto (Japan)
Gerges defeated Fujimoto by KO (3 knockdown, left low kick) at 1:41 of the 1st round.
Semi finals: K-1 rules / 3Min. 3R Ext. 1R
(Netherlands) Peter Aerts vs. Semmy Schilt (Netherlands)
Aerts defeated Schilt by 3 round majority decision 2-0 (29-29, 30-29, 30-29).
(Turkey) Gokhan Saki vs Alistair Overeem (Netherlands)
Overeem defeated Saki by TKO (arm injury) at 2:33 of the 1st round.
Super Fight (2): K-1 rules / 3Min. 3R Ext. 1R
(Russia) Sergey Kharitonov vs Singh Jaideep (India)
Jaideep defeated Kharitonov by KO (right hook) at 2:58 of the 1st round.
Final: K-1 rules / 3Min. 3R Ext. 2R
(Netherlands) Peter Aerts vs Alistair Overeem (Netherlands)
Overeem defeated Aerts by TKO (punches) at 1:07 of the 1st round.

== See also ==
- List of K-1 events
- List of K-1 champions
- List of male kickboxers
