= K-1 World Grand Prix 2009 Final =

K-1 martial arts event in 2009

- The poster for K-1 World Grand Prix 2009 Final
- Promotion: K-1
- Date: December 5, 2009
- Venue: Yokohama Arena
- City: Yokohama, Japan
- Attendance: 17,626

Event chronology
K-1 Europe Grand Prix 2009 in Tallinn	K-1 World Grand Prix 2009 Final	K-1 ColliZion 2009 Final Tournament

K-1 World Grand Prix 2009 Final was a martial arts event held by the K-1 on Saturday December 5, 2009 at the Yokohama Arena in Yokohama, Japan. It was the 17th K-1 World GP Final, the culmination of a year full of regional elimination tournaments. All fights followed K-1's classic tournament format and were conducted under K-1 Rules, three rounds of three minutes each, with a possible tiebreaker.

The qualification for the top eight fighters was held at the K-1 World Grand Prix 2009 in Seoul Final 16 on September 26, 2009 in Seoul, Korea.

Michael Buffer was the ring announcer for the night.

== Qualifying events ==
Qualifying events for K-1 World Grand Prix 2009 Final
	Location	Stadium	Date	Winner
K-1 Rumble of the Kings	Stockholm, Sweden	Hovet Arena	20 November 2009	Rickard Nordstrand (Sweden)
K-1 Europe Grand Prix	Tallinn, Estonia	Nokia Hall	21 November 2009	Andrei Bokan (Estonia)

== Match ups ==
The match ups were held the day proceeding the World Grand Prix Final 16. All fighters drew a ball from a box with a numbers on them and chose their spots in order from who drew ball number 1 to number 8. Ruslan Karaev who was first up chose spot number 1. Badr Hari was up next and decided to face Karaev for the third time. Errol Zimmerman was next and chose the 7th spot. Remy Bonjasky had the choice of fighting Zimmerman or picking another spot. Remy was tempted to take the 3rd spot so to be given the chance to fight Badr in the semi-finals, but was challenged by Zimmerman and Remy accepted. Jerome Lebanner decided to walk straight into the 5th spot. Semmy Schilt opted for a 4th match with Jerome. The last two finalists Ewerton Teixeira and Alistair Overeem will meet in the second quarter final match.

On November 28, it was announced that Sergei Kharitonov would be replacing Chalid Arrab to face Daniel Ghita in the second reserve bout.

== Results ==
K-1 World Grand Prix 2009 Final
Round	Match	Results
Opening fights: K-1 Rules / 3Min. 3R	(Japan) Keiichi Samukawa vs Ryuji Kajiwara (Japan)	Kajiwara defeated Samukawa by 3 round unanimous decision 3-0 (30-28, 30-28, 30-29).
Opening fights: K-1 Rules / 3Min. 3R	(India) Singh Jaideep vs Makoto Uehara (Japan)	Jaideep defeated Uehara by KO (right hook) at 1:36 of the 2nd round.
Opening fights: K-1 Rules / 3Min. 3R	(Czech Republic) Jan Soukup vs Tsutomu Takahagi (Japan)	Soukup defeated Takahagi by 3 round unanimous decision 3-0 (30-26, 30-27, 30-28).
Reserve fight 1: K-1 Rules / 3Min. 3R Ext. 1R	(Netherlands) Peter Aerts vs. Gokhan Saki (Turkey)	Aerts defeated Saki by 3 round unanimous decision 3-0 (30-27, 29-27, 29-28).
K-1 World Grand Prix 2009 Quarter finals: K-1 Rules / 3Min. 3R Ext. 1R	(Russia) Ruslan Karaev vs Badr Hari (Morocco)	Hari defeated Karaev by KO (2 knockdown, right hook) at 0:38 of the 1st round.
K-1 World Grand Prix 2009 Quarter finals: K-1 Rules / 3Min. 3R Ext. 1R	(Netherlands) Alistair Overeem vs Ewerton Teixeira (Brazil)	Overeem defeated Teixeira by KO (left knee kick) at 1:06 of the 1st round.
K-1 World Grand Prix 2009 Quarter finals: K-1 Rules / 3Min. 3R Ext. 1R	(France) Jerome Le Banner vs Semmy Schilt (Netherlands)	Schilt defeated Le Banner by KO (2 knockdown, Left front kick) at 1:27 of the 1st round.
K-1 World Grand Prix 2009 Quarter finals: K-1 Rules / 3Min. 3R Ext. 1R	(Netherlands) Errol Zimmerman vs Remy Bonjasky (Netherlands)	Bonjasky defeated Zimmerman by 3 round unanimous decision 3-0 (30-27, 30-28, 29-28).
Reserve fight 2: K-1 Rules / 3Min. 3R Ext. 1R	(Romania) Daniel Ghita vs Sergei Kharitonov (Russia)	Ghita defeated Kharitonov by KO (right low kick) at 0:36 of the 3rd round.
K-1 World Grand Prix 2009 Semi finals: K-1 Rules / 3Min. 3R Ext. 1R	(Morocco) Badr Hari vs Alistair Overeem (Netherlands)	Hari defeated Overeem by KO (2 knockdown, left high kick) at 2:14 of the 1st round.
K-1 World Grand Prix 2009 Semi finals: K-1 Rules / 3Min. 3R Ext. 1R	(Netherlands) Semmy Schilt vs. Remy Bonjasky (Netherlands)	Schilt defeated Bonjasky by KO (2 knockdown, right cross) at 2:38 of the 1st round.
Super fight: K-1 Rules / 3Min. 3R Ext. 1R	(Japan) Kyotaro vs Tyrone Spong (Suriname)	Spong defeated Kyotaro by 3 round unanimous decision 3-0 (30-27, 30-28, 30-28).
K-1 World Grand Prix 2009 Finals: K-1 Rules / 3Min. 3R Ext. 2R	(Morocco) Badr Hari vs Semmy Schilt (Netherlands)	Schilt defeated Hari by KO (2 knockdown, straight right) at 1:48 of the 1st round.

== K-1 World Grand Prix 2009 Final bracket ==
Final 16
(Russia) Ruslan Karaev	DEC
(Japan) Kyotaro	3r.
(Morocco) Badr Hari	KO
(Belarus) Zabit Samedov	1r.
(Netherlands) Peter Aerts	3r.
(Netherlands) Alistair Overeem	DEC
(Brazil) Ewerton Teixeira	DEC
(India) Singh Jaideep	5r.
(France) Jerome Le Banner	DEC
(Japan) Musashi	3r.
(Netherlands) Semmy Schilt	DEC
(Romania) Daniel Ghita	3r.
(Netherlands) Errol Zimmerman	DEC
(Brazil) Glaube Feitosa	3r.
(Netherlands) Remy Bonjasky	DEC
(Netherlands) Melvin Manhoef	3r.

Quarter-finals
(Russia) Ruslan Karaev	1r.
(Morocco) Badr Hari	TKO
(Netherlands) Alistair Overeem	KO
(Brazil) Ewerton Teixeira	1r.
(France) Jerome Le Banner	1r.
(Netherlands) Semmy Schilt	TKO
(Netherlands) Errol Zimmerman	3r.
(Netherlands) Remy Bonjasky	DEC

Semi-finals
(Morocco) Badr Hari	TKO
(Netherlands) Alistair Overeem	1r.
(Netherlands) Semmy Schilt	TKO
(Netherlands) Remy Bonjasky	1r.

Final
(Netherlands) Semmy Schilt	TKO
(Morocco) Badr Hari	1r.

== See also ==
- List of K-1 events
- List of K-1 champions
- List of male kickboxers
