= Wang Qiang =

Wang Qiang may refer to:

== Sportspeople ==
- Wang Qiang (footballer) (born 1984), Chinese association footballer
- Wang Qiang (wrestler) (born 1987), Chinese freestyle wrestler
- Wang Qiang (martial artist) (born 1989), Chinese kick boxer
- Wang Qiang (tennis) (born 1992), Chinese tennis player
- Wang Qiang (skier) (born 1993), Chinese cross-country skier

== Other ==
- Wang Zhaojun (1st century BC), also known as Wang Qiang, ancient Chinese beauty
- Wang Qiang (composer) (born 1935), Chinese composer
- Wang Qiang (calligrapher) (born 1959), Chinese calligrapher and professor
- Wang Qiang (serial killer) (1975–2005), Chinese serial killer
- Wang Qiang (general) (born 1963), Air Force general of the People's Liberation Army.

== See also ==
- Wang (surname)
