= Yuki Goto =

Yuki Goto may refer to:

- Yuki Goto (後藤 祐樹; born 1986), Japanese YouTuber and former singer from EE Jump
- Yuki Goto (後藤 夕貴; born 1993), Japanese former singer from Ciao Bella Cinquetti
- Yuki Goto (後藤 結; born 2008), Japanese singer and member of Ko1keyz
