= K-1 World Grand Prix 2001 Final =

K-1 martial arts event in 2001

- Promotion: K-1
- Date: December 8, 2001
- Venue: Tokyo Dome
- City: Tokyo, Japan
- Attendance: 65,000

Event chronology
K-1 World Grand Prix 2001 Preliminary Prague	K-1 World Grand Prix 2001 Final	K-1 World Grand Prix 2002 Preliminary Marseilles

K-1 World Grand Prix 2001 Final was a kickboxing event promoted by the K-1. The event was held at the Tokyo Dome in Tokyo, Japan on Saturday, December 8, 2001, in front of 65,000 spectators. It was the ninth K-1 Grand Prix final, involving eight of the world's top fighters, with all bouts fought under K-1 Rules (100 kg/156-220 lbs). The eight finalists had almost all qualified by winning preliminary tournaments (with the exception of Peter Aerts who was a runner up), while two additional fighters were invited as reserve fighters in case of any injuries (for more detail on this see bulleted list below).

As well as tournament bouts there was also the aforementioned 'Reserve Fight' to decide who would be a replacement for any injured competition fighters, fought under K-1 Rules, and a 'Super Fight' between local middleweight star Masato and Noel Soares, fought under K-1 MAX Rules (70 kg/152 lbs). In total there were twelve fighters at the event, representing eleven countries.

The tournament winner was Mark Hunt who defeated Francisco Filho in the final by extra round unanimous decision, for his first and only K-1 World Grand Prix final victory. Both him and Francisco Filho even reaching the final was seen as a huge upset, helped in part by all the competition favourites Ernesto Hoost, Jérôme Le Banner and Peter Aerts being knocked out at the Quarter Final stage.

Qualifiers - Finalists

- Peter Aerts - K-1 World Grand Prix 2001 in Las Vegas runner up
- Jérôme Le Banner - K-1 World Grand Prix 2001 in Osaka winner
- Francisco Filho - K-1 World Grand Prix 2001 in Fukuoka Repechage A winner
- Ernesto Hoost - K-1 World Grand Prix 2001 in Melbourne winner
- Mark Hunt - K-1 World Grand Prix 2001 in Fukuoka Repechage B winner
- Alexey Ignashov - K-1 World Grand Prix 2001 in Nagoya winner
- Stefan Leko - K-1 World Grand Prix 2001 in Las Vegas winner
- Nicholas Pettas - K-1 Andy Memorial 2001 Japan GP Final winner

Qualifiers - Reservists

- Mike Bernardo - K-1 World Grand Prix 2001 in Fukuoka Repechage B semi finalist
- Adam Watt - K-1 World Grand Prix 2001 in Fukuoka Repechage B runner up

== K-1 World Grand Prix 2001 Final Tournament ==
Quarter Finals
(Germany) Stefan Leko
(Netherlands) Ernesto Hoost	DEC
(France) Jérôme Le Banner
(New Zealand) Mark Hunt	KO
(Denmark) Nicholas Pettas
(Belarus) Alexey Ignashov	KO
(Brazil) Francisco Filho	TKO
(Netherlands) Peter Aerts

Semi Finals
(Germany) Stefan Leko *
(New Zealand) Mark Hunt	DEC
(Belarus) Alexey Ignashov
(Brazil) Francisco Filho	DEC

Final
(New Zealand) Mark Hunt	DEC
(Brazil) Francisco Filho

* Ernesto Hoost was injured after his match with Stefan Leko. As the Reserve Fight winner Mike Bernardo was also injured, Stefan Leko would take his place in the Semi Finals

== Results ==
K-1 World Grand Prix 2001 Final Results
K-1 Grand Prix Reserve Fight: K-1 Rules / 3Min. 3R Ext. 2R
(South Africa) Mike Bernardo def. Adam Watt (Australia)
Bernardo defeated Watt by 3rd Round Unanimous Decision 3-0 (29-28, 30-28, 29-28).
K-1 Grand Prix Quarter Finals: K-1 Rules / 3Min. 3R Ext. 2R
(Netherlands) Ernesto Hoost def. Stefan Leko (Germany)
Hoost defeated Leko by 3rd Round Unanimous Decision 3-0 (30-27, 30-27, 30-28) but had to retire due to injury - Stefan Leko would replace him in the Semi Finals as Reserve Fight winner Mike Bernardo was also injured.
(New Zealand) Mark Hunt def. Jérôme Le Banner (France)
Hunt defeated Le Banner by KO (Right Hook) at 2:32 of the 2nd Round.
(Belarus) Alexey Ignashov def. Nicholas Pettas (Denmark)
Ignashov defeated Pettas by KO (Right Knee) at 1:21 of the 2nd Round.
(Brazil) Francisco Filho def. Peter Aerts (Netherlands)
Filho defeated Aerts by TKO (Corner Stoppage) at 3:00 of the 2nd Round - Peter Aerts was injured.
K-1 Grand Prix Semi Finals: K-1 Rules / 3Min. 3R Ext. 2R
(New Zealand) Mark Hunt def. Stefan Leko (Germany)
Hunt defeated Leko by 3rd Round Unanimous Decision 3-0 (30-27, 30-26, 30-27).
(Brazil) Francisco Filho def. Alexey Ignashov (Belarus)
Filho defeated Ignashov by 3rd Round Unanimous Decision 3-0 (30-29, 30-29, 30-29).
Super Fight (-68 kg): K-1 Rules / 3Min. 5R
(Japan) Masato def. Noel Soares (Cape Verde)
Masato defeated Soares by KO (Right Punch) at 1:30 of the 3rd Round.
K-1 Grand Prix Final: K-1 Rules / 3Min. 3R Ext. 2R
(New Zealand) Mark Hunt def. Francisco Filho (Brazil)
Hunt defeated Filho by Extra Round Unanimous Decision 3-0 (10-9, 10-9, 10-9). After 3 rounds the judges had scored it a Decision Draw 0-0 (30-30, 30-30, 30-30).

== See also ==
- List of K-1 events
- List of K-1 champions
- List of male kickboxers
