= Rick Cheek =

American kickboxer and mixed martial artist (born 1977)

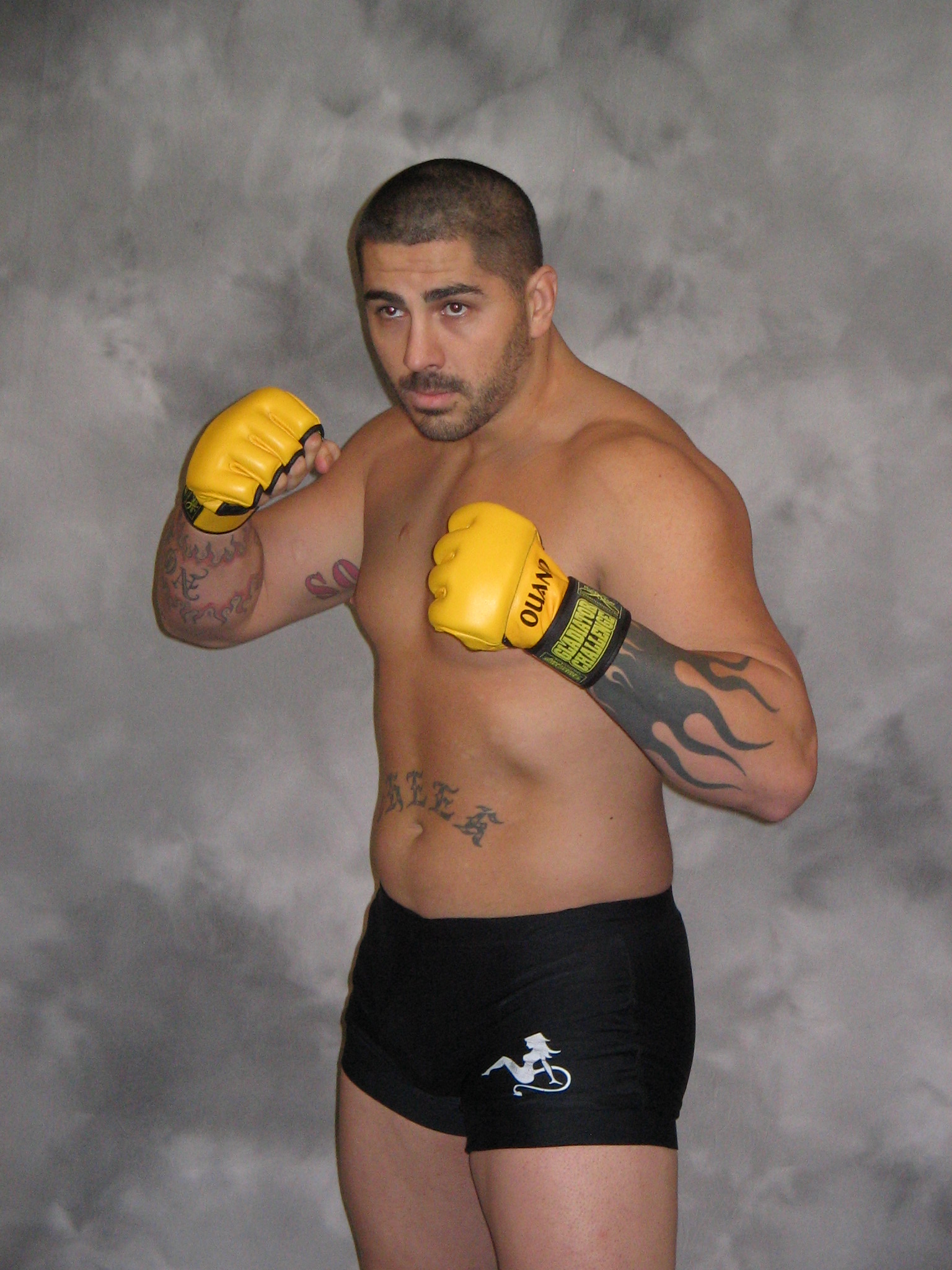
- Born: Richard P. Cheek; October 4, 1977 (age 49); San Francisco, California, United States
- Other names: Savage
- Nationality: American
- Height: 1.93 m (6 ft 4 in)
- Weight: 113 kg (249 lb; 17.8 st)
- Division: Heavyweight
- Style: Kickboxing, Muay Thai
- Fighting out of: Rohnert Park, California, United States
- Team: Nor-Cal Fighting Alliance
- Trainer: Billy Olsen
- Years active: 2000–present

Kickboxing record
- Total: 29
- Wins: 22
- By knockout: 19
- Losses: 5
- By knockout: 5
- Draws: 1
- No contests: 1

Mixed martial arts record
- Total: 8
- Wins: 4
- By knockout: 4
- Losses: 4
- By knockout: 1
- By submission: 3
- Last updated on: July 7, 2012

Richard P. "Rick" Cheek (born October 4, 1977) is an American kickboxer and mixed martial artist who competes in the heavyweight division. A North American Muay Thai champion as an amateur, Cheek turned professional in 2005 and debuted in K-1 the same year. He holds notable wins over WSOF standout Dave Huckaba in MMA, 2001 K-1 Japan Grand Prix Champion Nicholas Pettas and multiple time world kickboxing champion Mike Sheppard.

== Career ==
Cheek was the United States Air Force boxing champion and started training in kickboxing and Muay Thai in 2000 at the age of twenty-three. In August 2004, he competed in a four-man tournament held over two days in Orlando, Florida to determine the IKF Amateur North American Super Heavyweight (+106.8 kg/235 lb) Muay Thai Champion. After defeating Bernard Settle, Jr. by technical knockout in round two of their semi-final bout, he outpointed Brian Wells to a unanimous decision in the final to take the crown. He followed this up with the IKF's Amateur California Muay Thai title when he stopped Ben Davis with low kicks in round one in Fairfield, California on March 26, 2005.

After turning professional, Cheek made his K-1 debut on August 13, 2005, in a tournament reserve bout at the K-1 World Grand Prix 2005 in Las Vegas II against Mike Sheppard, knocking him out in the second round. He was absent from both K-1 Las Vegas events in 2006 due to a torn ACL and MCL he sustained in February 2006.

After a year out of the ring, Cheek returned on August 11, 2007, for the K-1 World Grand Prix 2007 in Las Vegas tournament. He stopped Imani Lee with a barrage of unanswered punches in round three in the quarter-finals but was unable to continue in the tournament due to a leg injury and was replaced by Doug Viney, who eventually went on to win the title.

In early 2008, Cheek fought for the Miami Force in the World Combat League and, on June 20, 2008, faced Patrice Quarteron for the vacant IKF World Super Heavyweight (+106.8 kg/235 lb) Muay Thai title in Montego Bay, Jamaica. He was sent to the canvas early with a flurry of punches and elbows. After beating the count, he was dropped with a low kick, which also caused Quarteron to fall over. As both fighters fell to the canvas, Quarteron's knee landed on Cheek's head, seemingly knocking him unconscious.

He soon made his way back to K-1 to fight in the K-1 World Grand Prix 2008 in Hawaii in Honolulu on August 9, 2008. He won by TKO against Kyokushin karate stylist Nicholas Pettas in the quarter-finals when Pettas aggravated a groin injury sustained in training early in the fight. He was then eliminated by the eventual tournament winner Gökhan Saki in the semis. He was floored with low kicks before being crumpled with a liver punch towards the end of round one.

In his second attempt at a world title, he challenged Ben Edwards for the vacant ISKA World Super Heavyweight (+96.4 kg/212 lb) Oriental rules belt in Canberra, Australia on April 4, 2009, but was KO'd inside the first minute of the opening frame.

On August 28, 2010, Cheek lost to Steven Banks via second-round KO in a fight for the WBC Muaythai United States Super Heavyweight (+104.5 kg/230 lb) title. He struggled with the knees of Banks, being floored by them on four occasions throughout the match.

Cheek suffered a one-sided beating at the hands of Cătălin Moroşanu, after re-tearing his MCL in the first round in their SuperKombat World Grand Prix 7 in Varna, Bulgaria bout on July 7, 2012. He was dropped five times, forcing referee Cezar Gheorghe to call a halt to the bout in the second round.

== Championships and awards ==
=== Kickboxing ===
- K-1
  - K-1 World Grand Prix 2008 in Hawaii 3rd place
  - Holds a record of 3-1 (3 KOs) in the K-1 circuit
- International Kickboxing Federation
  - IKF Amateur California Super Heavyweight (+106.8 kg/235 lbs) Muay Thai Championship
  - IKF Amateur North American Super Heavyweight (+106.8 kg/235 lbs) International Rules Championship
- World Combat Sports Challenge
  - WCSC World Super Heavyweight Muay Thai Championship
- World Kickboxing Association
  - WKA United States Super Heavyweight (+95 kg/209 lbs) Muay Thai Championship
  - WKA U.S. Amateur (+91 kg) Muay Thai Championship
  - WKA U.S. Amateur (+91 kg) Kickboxing Championship

=== Mixed martial arts ===
- Cage Combat Fighting Championships
  - CCFC Heavyweight Championship

=== Boxing ===
- United States Air Force Athletics
  - United States Air Force and Armed Services heavyweight boxing champion
- Golden Gloves
  - 2001 San Antonio Golden Gloves runner up (+201 lbs)

== Kickboxing record ==
22 wins (19 KOs), 5 losses, 1 draw, 1 no contest
Date	Result	Opponent	Event	Location	Method	Round	Time
2012-07-07	Loss	(Romania) Cătălin Moroşanu	SuperKombat World Grand Prix 7	Varna, Bulgaria	TKO (right hook)	2	1:07
2010-08-28	Loss	(United States) Steve Banks	WCK Muay Thai	Primm, Nevada, US	KO (knees)	2	2:52
For the WBC Muaythai United States Super Heavyweight (+104.5 kg/230 lb) Championship.
2009-05-30	Win	(United States) Ethen Cox	WCSC The Awakening	San Francisco, California, US	Decision (unanimous)	5	3:00
Wins the WCSC World Super Heavyweight Muay Thai Championship.
2009-04-04	Loss	(Australia) Ben Edwards	World Domination	Canberra, Australia	KO (right cross)	1	0:55
For the ISKA World Super Heavyweight (+96.4 kg/212 lb) Oriental Championship.
2008-08-09	Loss	(Netherlands) Gökhan Saki	K-1 World Grand Prix 2008 in Hawaii, Semi Finals	Honolulu, Hawaii, US	KO (left hook to the body)	1	2:36
2008-08-09	Win	(Denmark) Nicholas Pettas	K-1 World Grand Prix 2008 in Hawaii, Quarter Finals	Honolulu, Hawaii, US	TKO (injury)	1	1:15
2008-06-20	Loss	(France) Patrice Quarteron	Champions of Champions I	Montego Bay, Jamaica	KO (right low kick)	1	2:00
For the IKF World Super Heavyweight (+106.8 kg/235 lb) Muay Thai Championship.
2007-08-11	Win	(United States) Imani Lee	K-1 World Grand Prix 2007 in Las Vegas, Quarter Finals	Las Vegas, Nevada, US	TKO (punches)	3	1:52
2006-02-18	Win	(England) Mahmoud Fowzi	Combat Sports Challenge 12	Richmond, Virginia, US	TKO (corner stoppage)	1	1:56
Wins the WKA United States Super Heavyweight (+95 kg/209 lb) Muay Thai Championship.
2005-08-13	Win	(United States) Mike Sheppard	K-1 World Grand Prix 2005 in Las Vegas II, Reserve Bout	Las Vegas, Nevada, US	KO	2	0:48

Amateur kickboxing record
Date	Result	Opponent	Event	Location	Method	Round	Time
2008-03-28	Win	(United States) Terry Bullman	WCL Eastern Conference Playoffs	St. Charles, Missouri, US	Decision (28-20)	2	3:00
2005-03-26	Win	(United States) Ben Davis	Fairfield Fight Fest	Fairfield, California, US	KO (low kick)	1	0:50
Wins the IKF Amateur California Super Heavyweight (+106.8 kg/235 lb) Muay Thai Championship.
2004-08-15	Win	(United States) Brian Wells	IKF North American Classic, Final	Orlando, Florida, US	Decision (unanimous)	3	3:00
Wins the IKF Amateur North American Super Heavyweight (+106.8 kg/235 lb) Muay Thai Championship.
2004-08-14	Win	(United States) Bernard Settle, Jr.	IKF North American Classic, Semi Finals	Orlando, Florida, US	TKO	2	1:03
2004-02-28	Win	(United States) Matt Dunn	Feet & Fists of Fury	Roseville, California, US	TKO	2	1:40

Legend: Win Loss Draw/No contest Notes

== Mixed martial arts record ==
Professional record breakdown
8 matches	4 wins	4 losses
By knockout	4	1
By submission	0	3

Res.	Record	Opponent	Method	Event	Date	Round	Time	Location	Notes
Loss	4-4	Mike Hayes	TKO (submission to punches)	PFC: Best of Both Worlds	February 8, 2009	2	1:01	Lemoore, California, United States	
Loss	4-3	Dave Huckaba	Submission (armbar)	Gladiator Challenge 87: Collision Course	November 22, 2008	1	0:37	Roseville, California, United States	
Loss	4-2	Buddy Roberts	Submission (rear naked choke)	Cage Combat Fighting Championships: Mayhem	May 17, 2008	1	0:52	Santa Rosa, California, United States	
Win	4-1	Richard Blake	KO (punches)	Cage Combat Fighting Championships: Annihilation	February 16, 2008	1	2:05	Santa Rosa, California, United States	Wins the Cage Combat Fighting Championships Heavyweight Championship.
Loss	3-1	Chase Gormley	Submission (keylock)	Gladiator Challenge 73: High Noon	December 22, 2007	2	2:20	Sacramento, California, United States	
Win	3-0	Thomas Rosser	TKO (punches)	Gladiator Challenge 63: Crackdown	May 11, 2007	1	1:15	South Lake Tahoe, California, United States	
Win	2-0	Joe Abouata	KO (punch)	Gladiator Challenge 62: Sprawl or Brawl	April 14, 2007	1	0:31	Lakeport, California, United States	
Win	1-0	Dave Huckaba	TKO (punches)	Gladiator Challenge 57: Holiday Beatings	December 16, 2006	2	1:35	Sacramento, California, United States	
