= EE Jump =

Japanese musical duo

- Origin: Japan
- Genres: J-pop
- Years active: 2000–2002
- Label: Toy's Factory
- Past members: Sonim; Yuki; Ken
- Website: Website

EE Jump (stylized as EE JUMP) was a Japanese duo formed by Harmony Production in 2000. The duo's music was produced by Tsunku, with songs released through Toy's Factory. The members consisted of Sonim (lead vocals) and Yuki (rapper). Originally a trio, Ken, the group's lead dancer, left the group before their CD debut.

EE Jump became well known for their song "Otto Totto Natsu da ze!", which charted at No. 5 on the Oricon Weekly Singles Chart. However, after several scandals involving Yuki, the duo disbanded in April 2002.

== History ==
=== Pre-debut ===
In 1999, three teenagers were scouted by Harmony Promotion and were assigned to a group under the name "EE Jump", a pun of the Japanese phrase "that's great" (いいじゃん, ii jan). The group's music was produced by Tsunku. Sonim auditioned for Morning Musume's third generation and was scouted by their manager, Kaoru Wada, to be the group's lead vocalist; Yuki Goto, the younger brother of then-Morning Musume member Maki Goto, was scouted while at one of his sister's events and became the group's rapper. Half-Canadian, half-Japanese Ken was assigned the group's dancer. The trio made their first television appearance on Warau Inu no Bōken to perform a dance routine. Shortly before their CD debut, Ken left the agency. In Yuki's 2013 memoir, he stated that Ken had retired because he wanted to play soccer professionally.

=== 2000-2001: Debut ===
EE Jump released their debut single, "Love is Energy!", on October 18, 2000, which served as the theme song for Warau Inu no Bōken. The music video was filmed in Manhattan, New York. Their single was followed up by "Hello! Atarashii Watashi" on January 24, 2001. Their third single, "Otto Totto Natsu da ze!", was released on May 16, 2001 as the theme song for Hey! Hey! Hey! Music Champ. The song became a summer hit, charting at #5 on Oricon. EE Jump also had their own weekly radio show on Mondays, titled EE Jump no Radio de Ii jan (EE JUMPのラジオでイイジャン).

EE Jump's fourth single, "Iki na Rhythm!", was released on August 29, 2001. However, during the single's promotions, Yuki had an argument with the group's female manager over their crowded work schedules, which led to him physically assaulting her, checking out of his hotel room without permission, and fleeing to Tochigi Prefecture. In response, chief manager Kaoru Wada suspended his activities for three months. During this time, Sonim continued activities without him, releasing their fifth single, "Winter (Samui Kisetsu no Monogatari)", on November 28, 2001 under the name EE Jump featuring Sonim.

=== 2002: Disbandment ===
In February 2002, Yuki eventually rejoined the group after releasing an apology, and EE Jump released their sixth single, "Seishun no Sunrise", on March 6, 2002. Shortly after graduating middle school, he was photographed by tabloid magazine Friday at a cabaret club drinking alcohol while underage with a member of Johnny's Jr. Wada warned Yuki to keep his personal life private, but after Yuki refused, Wada and Tsunku agreed to revoke his contract in April 2002. EE Jump's first album, titled EE Jump Collection 1, was scheduled for release on May 9, 2002, but it was cancelled upon his dismissal. After Yuki's dismissal, EE Jump disbanded and the group was rebranded to promote Sonim as a solo artist. The songs "Ai wa Motto Sou Janakute", "Missing You", and "Ada Boy & Da Girl", which were originally written for EE Jump's cancelled album, were re-recorded and released as B-sides to Sonim's singles.

== Members ==
- Sonim (ソニン)
- Yuki (ユウキ)

== Discography ==
=== Studio albums ===
Title	Year	Details	Peak chart positions	Sales
Title	Year	Details	JPN	Sales
EE Jump Collection 1 (EE JUMP コレクション1)	2002	Released: May 9, 2002 (cancelled); Label: Toy's Factory; Formats: CD; Tracklisting: 1. "Otto Totto Natsu da ze!" (おっととっと夏だぜ!); 2. "Winter (Samui Kisetsu no Monogatari)" (WINTER～寒い季節の物語～); 3. "Ada Boy & Da Girl"; 4. "Iki na Rhythm!" (イキナリズム!); 5. "Seishun no Sunrise" (青春のSUNRISE); 6. "Ai wa Motto Sou Janakute" (愛はもっとそうじゃなくて) (Sonim solo); 7. "Love is Energy!"; 8. "Shitamachi Sodachi no Boku Dakara" (下町育ちの僕だから) (Yuki solo); 9. "Missing You"; 10. "Nakama tte Ii jan!" (仲間っていいじゃん！) (2002 version)	—	—
"—" denotes releases that did not chart or were not released in that region.

=== Singles ===
Title	Year	Peak position	Sales
Title	Year	JPN	Sales
"Love is Energy!"	2000	18	JPN: 50,950
"Hello! Atarashii Watashi" (HELLO!新しい私)	2001	17	JPN: 54,880
"Otto Totto Natsu da ze!" (おっととっと夏だぜ!)	2001	5	JPN: 188,820
"Iki na Rhythm!" (イキナリズム!)	2001	14	JPN: 45,880
"Winter (Samui Kisetsu no Monogatari)" (WINTER～寒い季節の物語～) (as EE Jump featuring Sonim)	2001	10	JPN: 65,690
"Seishun no Sunrise" (青春のSUNRISE)	2002	12	JPN: 59,410
"—" denotes releases that did not chart or were not released in that region.
