= Tomboy (band) =

Tomboy is a Japanese pop music duet made up of Sonim and Akane Osawa (Japanese: 大沢あかね). The group debuted on November 17, 2007, and records on the Avex Trax label.

Tomboy's only recording is the 2007 single Superstar, a remake of the song of the same title released by the Korean pop music girl group Jewelry in 2005. It remained on the Japanese charts for five weeks, peaking at number 27. The Tomboy recording was chosen as the closing theme to the Japanese variety program Sukibara.

== Discography ==
=== Superstar (single) ===
Release date: November 14, 2007
Formats: CD only (AVCD-31341); CD+DVD (AVCD-31341)
Tracks:

CD

1. Superstar (single)
2. Superstar (Ram Rider mix)
3. Superstar (TV mix)
4. Superstar (Hiro Down Under Remix)
5. Superstar (Instrumental)

DVD

1. Superstar (music video)
2. Superstar Choreography
