= Patrice Quarteron =

French kickboxer (born 1979)

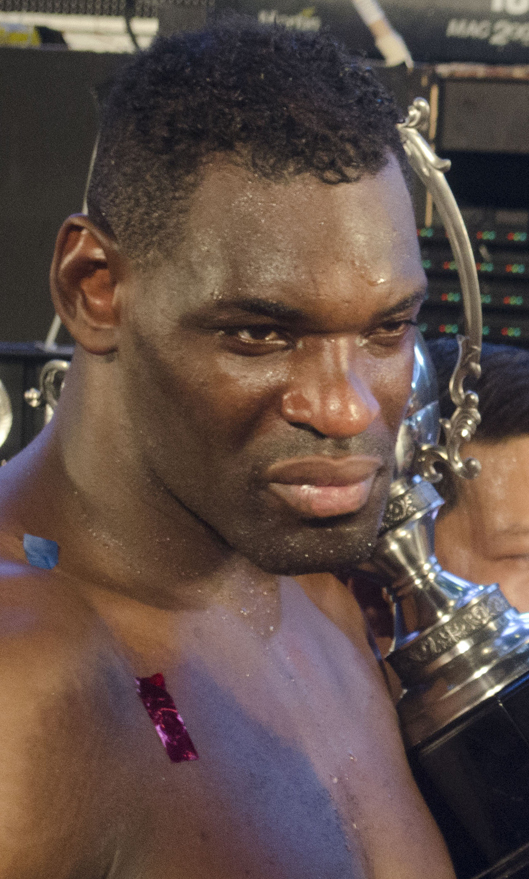
- Patrice Quarteron at THAI FIGHT 2012 final
- Born: March 20, 1979 (age 47); Sevran, Seine-Saint-Denis, France
- Other names: The Dark Ronin
- Nationality: French
- Height: 1.98 m (6 ft 6 in)
- Weight: 258 lb (117 kg; 18.4 st)
- Division: Heavyweight
- Style: Muay Thai, savate
- Fighting out of: Évry, Essonne, France
- Team: Team Zankifo
- Trainer: Alain Zankifo
- Years active: 2004–present

Kickboxing record
- Total: 49
- Wins: 42
- By knockout: 34
- Losses: 6
- By knockout: 4
- Draws: 1
- Last updated on: December 18, 2012

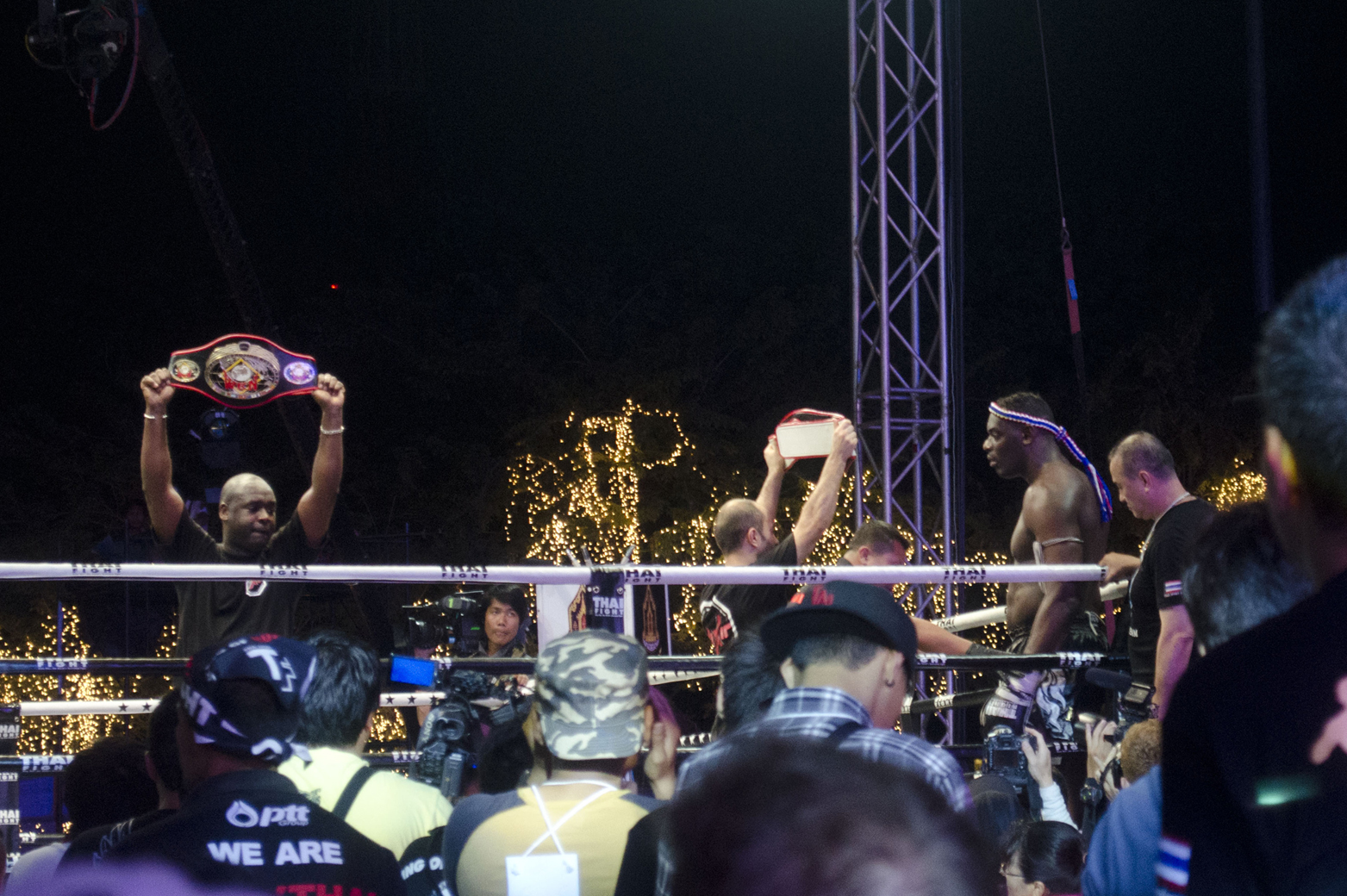
Quarteron's belt from various organizations

Patrice "The Dark Ronin" Quarteron (French pronunciation: [kaʁtəʁɔ̃]; born in Sevran on 20 March 1979) is a French heavyweight kickboxer, fighting out of Évry, Essonne. He is a two-time French and European Muay Thai champion and current IKF Muay Thai Super Heavyweight World champion.

== Biography and career ==
Quarteron faced Frédéric Sinistra for the second time on November 17, 2012 in Liège, Belgium and the pair fought to a draw.

He beat Angelo Da Rocha (Scory) and Dmitry Bezus to win the four man heavyweight tournament at the Thai Fight 2012 67 kg & 70 kg Tournament Finals in Bangkok, Thailand on December 16, 2012.

Quarteron was expected to fight Badr Hari at Global FC 4 in Dubai, UAE on October 16, 2014, but he was mysteriously replaced by another fighter, just 48 hours before the event.

He defeated Dževad Poturak in Carpentier Hall in Paris, France, on December 10, 2015, knocking him out in the first round with elbows.

Quarteron has not been beaten since 2009.

Quarteron defeated Rick Cheek by TKO at 2:00 of round 1 on June 20, 2008 in Montego Bay, Jamaica to win the IKF Pro Full Muay Thai Rules Super Heavyweight World title.

== Titles ==
- 2012 Thai Fight Heavyweight Tournament champion
- 2008 IKF Muay Thai Super Heavyweight World champion
- 2007 A1 World champion
- 2006 World Kickboxing Network (W.K.N.) Kickboxing European GP champion
- 2006 French Kickboxing vice champion
- 2006 French champion Honor of French Boxing
- 2005 Thaiboxing Carabeen Tournament champion
- 2005 Belgium Kickboxing champion
- 2005 K-1 Hungary Grand Prix runner up
- 2004 EMF/WMF European Heavyweight Thaiboxing champion

== Kickboxing record ==
Kickboxing & Muay Thaï record
42 wins (34 (T)KOs), 6 losses
Date	Result	Opponent	Event	Location	Method	Round	Time
2019-03-21	Win	(Brazil) Diego Dos Santos	Quarteron vs Dos Santos	France	TKO (referee stoppage/4 knockowns)	2	
2017-03-23	Win	(United States) James Wilson	Paris Fight 3	Paris, France	DQ (punches on the ground)	1	
2016-11-24	Loss	(England) Daniel Sam	Paris Fight 2	Paris, France	Decision	3	3:00
2015-12-10	Win	(Bosnia and Herzegovina) Dževad Poturak	Paris Fight	Paris, France	KO (elbows)	1	0:20
2014-12-25	Win	(Azerbaijan) Zamig Athakishiyev	One Shot World Series	Antalya, Turkey	Decision (unanimous)	3	3:00
2014-06-27	Win	(Slovakia) Kolstenitch	Strike fight	Lyon, France	KO	2	
2013-06-15	Win	(Italy) Luca Panto	Ultimate Kickboxing 3	Evry, France	KO	3	
2013-05-31	Win	(Turkey) Cihat Kapenek	A-1 World Combat Cup	Istanbul, Turkey	Decision (unanimous)	3	3:00
2012-12-16	Win	(Ukraine) Dmitry Bezus	Thai Fight 2012 Heavyweight Tournament, Final	Bangkok, Thailand	Decision	3	3:00
Won Thai Fight 2012 Heavyweight Tournament title.
2012-12-16	Win	(Belarus) Andrei Gerasimchuk	Thai Fight 2012 Heavyweight Tournament, Semi Finals	Bangkok, Thailand			
2012-11-17	Draw	(Belgium) Frédéric Sinistra	La Nuit Du Kick Boxing	Liège, Belgium	Decision draw		
2012-03-24	Win	(Belgium) Frédéric Sinistra	Ultimate Kick-Boxing 2	Évry, France	KO (elbows)	1	
2011-02-12	Win	(United States) Radu Spinghel	Ultimate Kick Boxing	Thiais, France	KO	1	
2009-11-28	Win	(United States) Bob Sapp	A-1 World Combat Cup	Lyon, France	KO (knee)	1	2:32
2009-11-11	Win	(Australia) Andre Meunier	Last Man Standing	Melbourne, Australia	KO (elbows)	2	
2009-06-26	Loss	(Poland) Paul Slowinski	Champions of Champions II	Montego Bay, Jamaica	KO (left hook)	2	1:55
Fight was for W.M.C. Super Heavyweight World title.
2009-04-18	Win	(Romania) Vasile Popovici	Fight Zone III	Villeurbanne, France	KO	1	
2008-06-20	Win	(United States) Rick Cheek	International Muaythai Fight Night	Montego Bay, Jamaica	KO (low kicks)	1	2:00
Wins I.K.F. Muay Thai Super Heavyweight World title.
2008-06-13	Win	(Portugal) Humberto Evora	Carcharias Fighting Championship	Perpignan, France	TKO (corner stoppage)	1	0:30
2008-04-26	Win	(Slovenia) Daniel Marhold	Fight Zone II	Villeurbanne, France	TKO (low kicks)	1	2:00
2008-03-31	Win	(Australia) Chris Christoupoulides	No Respect 4	Melbourne, Australia	TKO (referee stoppage)	1	
2007-12-21	Win	(Ukraine) Sergei Arkhipov	A-1 World Combat Cup	Turkey	TKO (corner stoppage)	4	
2007-10-12	Win	(France) Fabrice Aurieng	A-1 World Combat Cup	Ankara, Turkey	KO (knee strike)	1	
2007-07-20	Win	(Turkey) Orhan Dogan	A-1 World Combat Cup	Istanbul, Turkey	KO (low kicks)	2	
2007-07-14	Win	(Poland) Marcin Rozalski	A-1 World Combat Cup	Turkey	TKO	3	
2007-06-16	Win	(Croatia) Nash Urladzic	La Nuit des Superfights VIII	Paris-Bercy, France	TKO (referee stoppage)	1	
2007-05-29	Win	(France) Jordan Faribol	Fight Zone I	Villeurbanne, France	TKO (corner stoppage)	1	
2007-05-04	Win	(Suriname) Ashwin Balrak	K-1 Fighting Network Romania 2007, Reserve fight	Bucharest, Romania	Decision (unanimous)	3	3:00
2007-02-10	Win	(France) Alix Kehil	La Nuit des Superfights VI	Villeurbanne, France	KO	1	
2007-01-26	Win	(Belarus) Sergei Gur	K-1 Rules Kick Tournament 2007 in Marseilles	Marseille, France	TKO	3	
2006-12-16	Win	(France) Brice Guidon	La Nuit des Superfights V	Villebon, France	TKO (referee stoppage)	1	
2006-05-20	Loss	(France) Guy N'Guessan	WAKO World title	France	TKO (eye injury)		
Fight was for W.A.K.O. World title.
2006-03-10	Win	(France) Alban Galonnier	WKN European GP 2006, Final	Perpignan, France	TKO	2	
Wins W.K.N. European GP 2006 title.
2006-03-10	Win	(Romania) Aurel Bococi	WKN European GP 2006, Semi Final	Perpignan, France	TKO (knee injury)	2	
2005-11-26	Loss	(France) Gregory Tony	La Nuit des Champions	Marseilles, France	Decision (unanimous)	5	2:00
Fight was for W.K.B.C. Heavyweight title.
2005-08-19	Loss	(Hungary) Attila Karacs	K-1 Hungary Grand Prix 2005, Final	Debrecen, Hungary	KO (punch)	1	2:45
Fight was for K-1 Hungary Grand Prix 2005 title.
2005-08-19	Win	(Hungary) Sandor Kiss	K-1 Hungary Grand Prix 2005, Semi Final	Debrecen, Hungary	TKO	1	
2005-06-04	Win	(France) Mamadou Camara	Thaiboxing Carabeen Tournament, Final	Saint-Ouen, France	KO	1	0:50
Wins Thaiboxing Carabeen Tournament title.
2005-06-04	Win	(France) Sylvain Verne	Thaiboxing Carabeen Tournament, Semi Final	Saint-Ouen, France	KO	1	
2005-05-28	Win	(Belgium) Diego Massimongo	"New Talents"	Mouscron, Belgium	KO (low kicks)	1	0:30
2004-12-03	Loss	(United States) Mike Vieira	WAKO-PRO Gala of the Champs	Lisbon, Portugal	KO	1	
2004-10-24	Win	(Turkey)	WMF European Muay Thai Amateur Championship, Final	Prague, Czech Republic	KO	1	1:30
Wins E.M.F./W.M.F. European Heavyweight Thaiboxing Amateur title (91 kg).
2004-10-24	Win	(Czech Republic) Joze Strep	WMF European Muay Thai Amateur Championship, Semi Final	Prague, Czech Republic	KO	1	
Legend: Win Loss Draw/no contest Notes

== See also ==
- List of K-1 events
- List of male kickboxers
