= Frédéric Sinistra =

Belgian kickboxer (1981–2021)

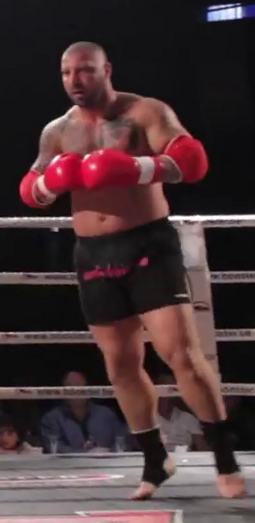
- Born: 13 January 1980; Seraing, Belgium
- Died: 15 December 2021 (aged 41); Havelange, Belgium
- Nickname: The Undertaker
- Nationality: (Belgium) Belgian
- Style: Kickboxing

Kickboxing record
- Total: 48
- Wins: 39
- Losses: 9

Frédéric Sinistra (13 January 1980 – 15 December 2021) was a Belgian kickboxing champion who died from COVID-19. Born in Seraing, Sinistra taught himself kickboxing at a young age and began competing in the sport at age sixteen. He went on to win the Belgian National Championship title four times and the World Championship a total of three times.

Sinistra was nicknamed "the Undertaker", and at one time was called "Belgium's strongest man". Opponents that Sinistra defeated included Stefan Leko and Dževad Poturak, while he was defeated by Badr Hari, Grégory Tony, and Patrice Quarteron.

Sinistra won the ISKA K-1 Super Heavyweight title after defeating Antonio Rubio in 2019.

Sinistra, an anti-vaccinationist, was unvaccinated and a denier of COVID-19. When he became infected with COVID-19 in late November 2021, he would not acknowledge he had it. He was admitted to hospital but voluntarily discharged himself soon after. He died of COVID-19 complications in Havelange a few weeks later.
