= Nicholas Pettas =

Actor and martial artist (born 1973)

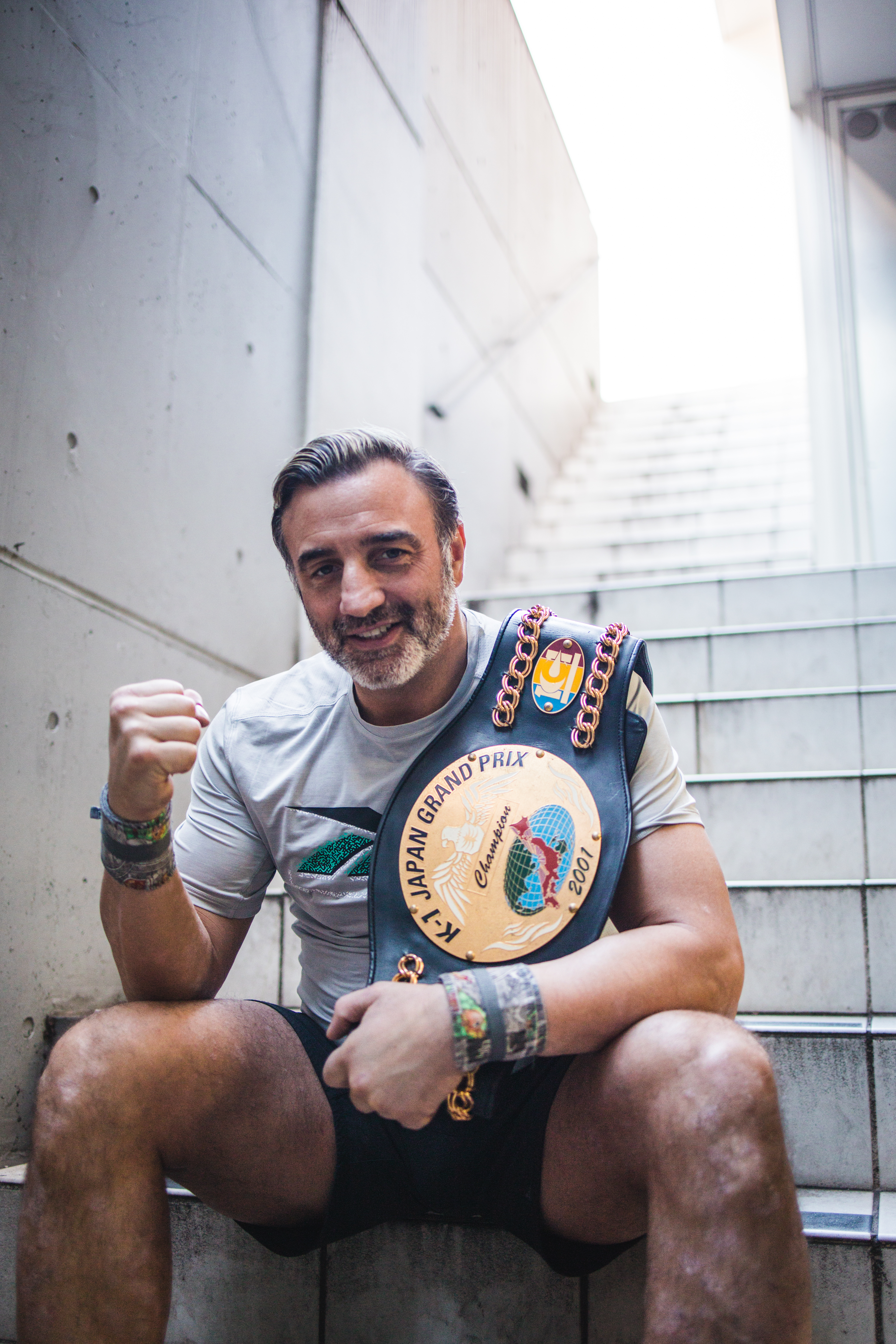
- Born: January 23, 1973 (age 53); Mykonos, Greece
- Other names: The Blue-Eyed Samurai
- Height: 1.78 m (5 ft 10 in)
- Weight: 98 kg (216 lb; 15.4 st)
- Division: Heavyweight
- Style: Kyokushin Karate
- Stance: Orthodox
- Fighting out of: Tokyo, Japan
- Team: Team Spirit
- Rank: 6th Black belt in Kyokushin
- Years active: 1991–2008

Kickboxing record
- Total: 18
- Wins: 9
- By knockout: 8
- Losses: 9
- By knockout: 8

Other information
- Occupation: Martial Artist, Actor, Content Creator, Reebok Ambassador, Crossfit Owner - ACROSS FITNESS
- Spouse: Angela Ortiz Pettas
- Notable students: Koichi Watanabe, Leona Pettas
- Website: http://www.nicholaspettas.com/

Nicholas Pettas (born January 23, 1973) is a Greek karateka, former heavyweight kickboxer and actor, who fought out of Team Spirit Tokyo, Japan. Pettas mainly competed in the promotion K-1 between 1998 and 2007, and was the winner of the K-1 Japan Grand Prix 2001.

Although an undersized heavyweight, Pettas is known for his powerful low kicks and holds notable victories over Yusuke Fujimoto, Nobu Hayashi, Musashi, Gökhan Saki and Péter Varga.

== Early life and karate career ==
Pettas was born in Mykonos, Greece. Following the death of his father, he moved to Denmark with his mother.

After being beaten up in a street fight when he was fourteen, he decided to join a karate school to learn to defend himself. Not knowing which styles there were, he was introduced to Kyokushin by Michael Mattheson, a friend of his brother Tony. He found himself a new following and needed no more schooling, and so at the age of eighteen decided to leave high school in order to save up money to go to Japan and study with Masutatsu Oyama, the founder of Kyokushin. After getting permission to join the uchi-deshi program, a live-in training of 1000 days, he moved to Japan from Denmark at the age of eighteen. At the age of twenty-one, he completed the vigorous training course to become the second non-Japanese ever to finalize the program (the first being Judd Reid). He was last Uchi-Deshi of Master Oyama, who died soon after Pettas' graduation.

After his graduation of the programme, he competed in several tournaments and achieved many significant titles and honours such as Heavy Weight European Champion 1995, and placing 3rd and 5th place in the World Championships, respectively in 1995 and 1997.

== Kickboxing career ==
=== Early career (1998–2002) ===
Following his successful career in full contact karate, Pettas joined K-1, a Japan-based kickboxing organization. He made his debut against Stefan Leko at K-1 Dream '98 on July 18, 1998, in Nagoya, Japan.

Pettas competed in the eight-man tournament at the K-1 World Grand Prix 2000 in Nagoya on July 30, 2000. He stopped fellow karate-Ka Ricky Nickolson with a low kick in the quarter-finals before going on to face Jérôme Le Banner in the semis. The end of the fight was somewhat bizarre. Le Banner knocked Pettas down twice and the referee stopped the match according to 8 Man tournament rules. Upon the second knockdown, Pettas returned to his feet sharply and prepared to punch Le Banner only to stop. Le Banner then replied by striking Pettas with a right hook, knocking him unconscious. Pettas as later stated that he did not realize the fight was over and stood up to try and finish the fight, only to get sucker punched for intimidating LeBanner.

Following this, he lost a unanimous decision to Michael McDonald in a superfight at the K-1 World Grand Prix 2000 in Fukuoka on October 9, 2000. He bounced back, however, by using low kicks to KO Peter Varga at K-1 Gladiators 2001 on March 17, 2001.

The peak of Pettas' career came on August 19, 2001, when he won the K-1 Andy Memorial 2001 Japan GP Final at the Tokyo Dome. He finished Yusuke Fujimoto and Nobu Hayashi with his now-famous low kicks in the quarters and semis, respectively, before advancing to the final to take on Musashi. After three rounds the bout was called a draw and went into an extra round to decide the winner, after which Pettas prevailed with a unanimous decision victory.

This tournament win qualified him for the 2001 K-1 World Grand Prix, the annual gathering of the best heavyweight kickboxers in the world for a one-night tournament. At the K-1 World Grand Prix 2001 Final in Tokyo on December 8, 2001, he was eliminated at the first stage by Alexey Ignashov. While Pettas' low kicks did damage to Ignashov, the much larger fighter was able to knock him out with a knee strike in round two.

He returned to the ring on April 21, 2002, against Peter Aerts at K-1 Burning 2002 in Hiroshima, and was knocked out with a knee once again. Then, on June 2, 2002, he fought Sergei Gur at K-1 Survival 2002 in Toyama. During the second round, Pettas hit Gur with a right low kick. Gur checked the kick, breaking Pettas' shin bone. This injury kept Pettas out of competition for 3 years and 4 months.

=== Return from injury and later career (2005–2008) ===
He finally returned to the ring on October 8, 2005, against a young Gökhan Saki at Bushido Europe: Rotterdam Rumble in Rotterdam, Netherlands. He defeated Saki via technical knockout when his corner stopped the fight in the second round. Saki could not provide an answer to the striking arsenal of Pettas. Pettas showed superior technical fighting intelligence than Saki who did not do any damage

In late 2006, Pettas knocked out two opponents and earned a return to K-1. Badr Hari greeted him in his second debut at the annual New Year's Eve martial arts event, K-1 PREMIUM 2006 Dynamite!!, on December 31, 2006. Hari won the fight as Pettas was unable to continue after obtaining a broken arm in the second round.

He then rematched Peter Aerts in a superfight at the K-1 World Grand Prix 2007 in Hong Kong on August 5, 2007. Although this time a seriously motivated Pettas brought the A-gam to Aerts. He got the better once again, knocking Pettas out with a spectacular high kick in round two.

After losing his past five fights in K-1, Pettas finally broke this streak with a sensational KO victory over South Korean giant Kim Young-hyun (often anglicised to Younghyun Kim) at K-1 PREMIUM 2007 Dynamite!! on December 31, 2007. Pettas wore down Kim, who stood fifteen inches taller than him and weighed more than 140 lbs more than Pettas, with low kicks before dispatching him with punches forty-one seconds into round two. This KO is to this day an all time record for a small man to stop a big man in stand up striking combat sport. The size difference was 15.3 inches / 39 cm (1.78m/5′10″ vs. 2.17m/7′1.½″). Kim's fellow Korean Choi Hong-man was only 12.9 inches / 33 cm taller than Mighty Mo when he lost via KO in March 2007. In boxing the record stands at 14.9 inches / 38 cm when Randy Davis (1.80m/5′11″) knocked out Tom Payne (2.18m/7′2″) in 1985.

His last fight came on August 9, 2008, when he was eliminated in the quarter-finals of the K-1 World Grand Prix 2008 in Hawaii by Rick Cheek, severing a muscle in his thigh made him pull out and Rick Cheek was awarded the winner by TKO due to referee stoppage.

== Personal life ==
Pettas currently lives in Tokyo, Japan. He is also an actor, appearing in Japanese cinema and television. Perhaps his best known role is alongside Kimura Takuya in the TV drama Change. From 2008 to 2009, the NHK World show Samurai Spirit was created and produced to fit his personality and the show has won several international prizes for best sports educational shows and best sports documentary. As of 2013, he is co-presenter of the NHK World television show Imagine-nation, with Chiaki Horan. He is currently a Reebok Ambassador and owner of ACROSS FITNESS Nishi Azabu. He also runs the popular YouTube channel Nicholas Pettas Official , where he explores People, Food & Culture across the world.

Since 2022, Nicholas Pettas is the Official MC of SENSHI and a member of the Board of the KWU SENSHI.

== Titles ==
=== Karate ===
- 8th European Weight Championships Heavyweight Champion (1995)
- 6th World Open Karate Tournament 5th Place (1995) (lost to Francisco Filho)
- 1st World Weight Category Championships 3rd Place (1997) (lost to Glaube Feitosa)
- 7th World Open Karate Tournament 5th Place (1999) (lost to Aleksandr Pitchkounov)
- 10th Shin Karate World Championships Champion (2000)

=== Kickboxing ===
- K-1
  - 2001 K-1 Japan Grand Prix Champion

== Filmography ==
- House of Smack Down (2003)
- Road 88 (2003)
- Sibirian Express 5 (2004)
- Oh! My Zombie Mermaid (2004)
- Wrestling Inferno (2005)
- The Winds of God, Kamikaze (2005)
- LoveDeath (2006)
- Puzzle (2008)
- Change (2008)
- The Waste Land (2009)

== Kickboxing record ==
Kickboxing record
9 wins (8 KOs), 9 losses
Date	Result	Opponent	Event	Location	Method	Round	Time	Record	Notes
August 9, 2008	Loss	(United States) Rick Cheek	K-1 World Grand Prix 2008 in Hawaii	Honolulu, Hawaii, USA	TKO (referee stoppage)	1	1:15	9-9	2008 Hawaii Grand Prix quarter-final.
December 31, 2007	Win	(South Korea) Kim Young-hyun	K-1 PREMIUM 2007 Dynamite!!	Osaka, Japan	KO (right punch)	2	0:41	9-8	
August 5, 2007	Loss	(Netherlands) Peter Aerts	K-1 World Grand Prix 2007 in Hong Kong	Hong Kong	KO (right high kick)	2	2:24	8-8	
December 31, 2006	Loss	(Morocco) Badr Hari	K-1 PREMIUM 2006 Dynamite!!	Osaka, Japan	TKO (arm injury)	2	1:28	8-7	
September 23, 2006	Win	(Japan) Takeshi Onda	HEAT 2	Aichi, Japan	TKO (corner stoppage)	2	1:00	8-6	
August 18, 2006	Win	(Australia)	Xplosion Superfight 14	Sydney, Australia	KO (punches)	3	-	7-6	
October 8, 2005	Win	(Turkey) Gökhan Saki	Bushido Europe: Rotterdam Rumble	Rotterdam, Netherlands	TKO (corner stoppage)	2	-	6-6	
June 2, 2002	Loss	(Belarus) Sergei Gur	K-1 Survival 2002	Toyama, Japan	TKO (leg injury)	2	1:00	5-6	
April 21, 2002	Loss	(Netherlands) Peter Aerts	K-1 Burning 2002	Hiroshima, Japan	KO (knee)	1	2:50	5-5	
December 8, 2001	Loss	(Belarus) Alexey Ignashov	K-1 World Grand Prix 2001 Final	Tokyo, Japan	KO (right knee)	2	1:21	5-4	2001 K-1 World Grand Prix quarter-final.
August 19, 2001	Win	(Japan) Musashi	K-1 Andy Memorial 2001 Japan GP Final	Saitama, Japan	Extra round decision (unanimous)	4	3:00	5-3	2001 Japan Grand Prix final.
August 19, 2001	Win	(Japan) Nobu Hayashi	K-1 Andy Memorial 2001 Japan GP Final	Saitama, Japan	KO (right low kick)	1	1:26	4-3	2001 Japan Grand Prix semi-final.
August 19, 2001	Win	(Japan) Yusuke Fujimoto	K-1 Andy Memorial 2001 Japan GP Final	Saitama, Japan	KO (right low kick)	1	2:57	3-3	2001 Japan Grand Prix quarter-final.
March 17, 2001	Win	(Hungary) Péter Varga	K-1 Gladiators 2001	Yokohama, Japan	KO (right low kick)	3	1:39	2-3	
October 9, 2000	Loss	(Canada) Michael McDonald	K-1 World Grand Prix 2000 in Fukuoka	Nagoya, Japan	Decision (unanimous)	3	3:00	1-3	
July 30, 2000	Loss	(France) Jérôme Le Banner	K-1 World Grand Prix 2000 in Nagoya	Nagoya, Japan	KO (left hook)	1	3:00	1-2	2000 Nagoya Grand Prix semi-final.
July 30, 2000	Win	(England) Ricky Nickolson	K-1 World Grand Prix 2000 in Nagoya	Nagoya, Japan	KO (right low kick)	1	1:27	1-1	2000 Nagoya Grand Prix quarter-final.
July 18, 1998	Loss	(Germany) Stefan Leko	K-1 Dream '98	Nagoya, Japan	KO (punch)	2	1:09	0-1	
Legend: Win Loss Draw/No contest

== See also ==
- List of male kickboxers
- List of K-1 Events
