= Yusuke Fujimoto =

Japanese martial artist

- Born: Fujimoto Yūsuke; July 22, 1975 (age 51); Kyoto, Japan
- Native name: 藤本 祐介
- Other names: Bun Bun Maru
- Nationality: (Japan) Japanese
- Height: 1.78 m (5 ft 10 in)
- Weight: 98 kg (216 lb; 15.4 st)
- Division: Heavyweight
- Style: Seidokaikan
- Team: Monster Factory
- Years active: 11 (1999–2010)

Kickboxing record
- Total: 45
- Wins: 27
- By knockout: 13
- Losses: 17
- By knockout: 15
- No contests: 1
- Last updated on: December 11, 2010

Yusuke Fujimoto (Japanese: 藤本祐介 [ɸɯʑiꜜmoto juꜜːsɯ̥ke]; born July 22, 1975) is a Japanese former heavyweight kickboxer who competed in K-1 and was the K-1 World GP 2007 in Hong Kong tournament champion. He is nicknamed "Bun Bun Maru" because of his tendency to throw big, swinging punches, and is distinguishable by his bald head and lack of eyebrows. He holds notable victories over Musashi, Dewey Cooper, and Francois Botha.

== Career ==
Fujimoto made his professional kickboxing debut at K-1 Rising 2000 on January 25, 2000 and scored a second round TKO victory over Masanobu Yamanaka. He briefly stepped down to amateur status the same year, winning the Monster Challenge 2000 K-2 Tournament via decision over the returning Yamanaka. This was the only championship Fujimoto would win for some time: he entered four regional tournaments within the following three years but was regularly defeated, advancing no further than the last match of the K-1 Survival 2003 Japan Grand Prix Final.

At K-1 Burning 2004, Fujimoto broke his right arm during a match with Montanha Silva. The injury kept him out of competition for 14 months. He returned to fight Carter Williams at the K-1 World Grand Prix 2005 in Las Vegas, but was injured again when Williams broke his nose, ending the match via no contest. Fujimoto later made it to the finals of the K-1 World Grand Prix 2005 in Hawaii but was knocked out by Gary Goodridge.

The following year saw a change in Fujimoto’s fortune. On June 3, he bested ssireum wrestler Dong-wook Kim, karateka Tsuyoshi Nakasako, and Olympic judoka Kim Min-soo to win the K-1 World Grand Prix 2006 in Seoul – becoming the first Japanese K-1 competitor to win an overseas tournament. His victory brought him to the K-1 World Grand Prix 2006 in Osaka opening round, where he fought the legendary Ernesto Hoost to a third round KO loss. In March 2007, he entered a tournament to determine the first K-1 Heavyweight Champion and met Musashi in the semifinals at the K-1 World Grand Prix 2007 in Yokohama. In one of the most significant wins of his career, Fujimoto exercised great timing and reach over the two-time WGP runner-up, eventually securing a TKO with a kick to the head. He subsequently met Badr Hari at the finals and suffered a KO loss within the first minute of the opening round.

Later that year, Fujimoto won the K-1 World Grand Prix 2007 in Hong Kong – his second regional tournament. It was a controversial event, with Fujimoto losing his semifinal match to Taiei Kin but nevertheless advancing due to Kin suffering a facial injury. Fujimoto entered his finals match to conspicuous silence from the crowd, but eventually elicited cheers upon defeating sanshou champion Wang Qiang. Fujimoto subsequently reached the WGP final elimination for a second time but forfeited to opponent Junichi Sawayashiki following multiple knockdowns.

Fujimoto lost his only 2008 bout to karate champion Ewerton Teixeira after breaking his right arm for a second time. He was out of action for over a year, and declared on his personal blog to be considering withdrawal from kickboxing. These considerations proved concrete, as Fujimoto engaged in his retirement match on November 3, 2009 – defeating Junpei Hamada by unanimous decision at the Japan-Korea International Martial Arts Competition. Over a year later, he fought an additional retirement bout for K-1 so as to bid farewell to the company responsible for his career. On December 10 at the K-1 World Grand Prix 2010 Final, Fujimoto competed against Hesdy Gerges. Over 8 inches (22 cm) shorter than his opponent and considerably less muscular than his norm, he was knocked down three times in the first round and lost via TKO. After the bout, a retirement ceremony commenced wherein Fujimoto received flowers from his family and thanked his authorities and fans. He retired with a record of 27 wins, 17 losses, and 1 no contest.

== Personal life ==
Fujimoto claims that his signature look of a bald head and brows is the result of natural causes, stating he suffered from alopecia areata because of stress involved in his participation in martial arts competitions, and decided to shave his head. He had previously suffered from the condition during high school. His eyebrows began growing back in July 2005.

He is an avid bodybuilder and weightlifter, bench pressing a personal best of 140 kilos (308 pounds).

He has a sister, as well as one niece and one nephew. His favorite food is ayu.

== Titles ==
- Professional
  - 2007 K-1 World Grand Prix in Hong Kong champion
  - 2006 K-1 World Grand Prix in Seoul champion
  - 2005 K-1 World Grand Prix in Hawaii runner up
  - 2005 Japan GP 3rd place
  - 2003 K-1 Japan GP runner up
  - 2002 K-1 Japan GP 3rd place
- Amateur
  - Monster Challenge 2000 K-2 Tournament Heavyweight winner

== Kickboxing record ==
Kickboxing record
27 wins (13 KOs), 17 losses, 1 no contest
Date	Result	Opponent	Event	Location	Method	Round	Time
2010-12-11	Loss	(Netherlands) Hesdy Gerges	K-1 World Grand Prix 2010 Final Super-fight	Ariake, Japan	KO (right leg kicks)	1	1:41
2009-11-03	Win	(Japan) Junpei Hamada	Japan-Korea International Martial Arts Competition: Gladiator Okayama	Okayama, Japan	Decision (unanimous)	3	3:00
2008-04-13	Loss	(Brazil) Ewerton Teixeira	K-1 World Grand Prix 2008 in Yokohama	Yokohama, Japan	KO (right cross)	2 ext R.(5)	2:01
2007-09-29	Loss	(Japan) Junichi Sawayashiki	K-1 World GP 2007 final elimination	Seoul, Korea	KO (gave up/3 knockdowns)	3	1:34
2007-08-05	Win	(China) Wang Qiang	K-1 World Grand Prix 2007 in Hong Kong Final	Hong Kong	KO (left hook)	1	2:49
Wins K-1 World GP 2007 in Hong Kong Tournament.
2007-08-05	Loss	(Japan) Taiei Kin	K-1 World Grand Prix 2007 in Hong Kong Semi-final	Hong Kong	KO (knee attack)	2	1:59
Yusuke Fujimoto replaced Taiei Kin in the final as Taiei Kin was unable to continue due to an injury.
2007-08-05	Win	(China) Shi Hongjian	K-1 World Grand Prix 2007 in Hong Kong Quarter-final	Hong Kong	Decision (unanimous)	3	3:00
2007-04-28	Loss	(Morocco) Badr Hari	K-1 World Grand Prix 2007 in Hawaii	Honolulu, Hawaii	KO (left high kick)	1	0:56
The bout was for the vacant 1st K-1 Heavyweight championship title.
2007-03-04	Win	(Japan) Musashi	K-1 World Grand Prix 2007 in Yokohama	Yokohama, Japan	KO (left high kick)	Ex.1 (4)	1:23
Elimination match for challenging the vacant 1st K-1 Heavyweight championship title.
2006-12-16	Loss	(France) Freddy Kemayo	K-1 Fighting Network Prague Round '07	Prague, Czech Republic	KO	3	2:35
2006-09-30	Loss	(Netherlands) Ernesto Hoost	K-1 World Grand Prix 2006 in Osaka opening round Elimination Fight	Osaka, Japan	KO (right low kick)	3	2:09
2006-07-30	Win	(Nigeria) Bobby Ologun	K-1 World Grand Prix 2006 in Sapporo	Sapporo, Japan	Decision (unanimous)	3	3:00
2006-06-03	Win	(South Korea) Min-Soo Kim	K-1 World Grand Prix 2006 in Seoul Final	Seoul, South Korea	KO (right hook)	2	0:23
Winning the title of K-1 World Grand Prix 2006 in Seoul tournament.
2006-06-03	Win	(Japan) Tsuyoshi Nakasako	K-1 World Grand Prix 2006 in Seoul Semi-final	Seoul, South Korea	Decision (majority 2-0)	3	3:00
2006-06-03	Win	(South Korea) Dong-Wook Kim	K-1 World Grand Prix 2006 in Seoul Quarter-final	Seoul, South Korea	Decision (unanimous)	3	3:00
2006-04-29	Loss	(United States) Carter Williams	K-1 World Grand Prix 2006 in Las Vegas	Las Vegas, Nevada	Decision (unanimous)	3	3:00
2005-07-29	Loss	(Trinidad and Tobago) Gary Goodridge	K-1 World Grand Prix 2005 in Hawaii Final	Honolulu, Hawaii	KO (left hook)	3	1:19
The bout was for K-1 World Grand Prix 2005 in Hawaii tournament title.
2005-07-29	Win	(United States) Marcus Royster	K-1 World Grand Prix 2005 in Hawaii Semi final	Honolulu, Hawaii	KO (left hook)	1	2:16
2005-07-29	Win	(United States) Scott Junk	K-1 World Grand Prix 2005 in Hawaii Quarter final	Honolulu, Hawaii	KO (right hook)	3	2:21
2005-06-14	Loss	(Japan) Tatsufumi Tomihira	K-1 World Grand Prix 2005 in Hiroshima Semi-final	Hiroshima, Japan	KO (right high kick)	1	2:39
2005-06-14	Win	(Japan) Ryu Moriguchi	K-1 World Grand Prix 2005 in Hiroshima Quarter-final	Hiroshima, Japan	Decision (unanimous)	3	3:00
2005-04-30	NC	(United States) Carter Williams	K-1 World Grand Prix 2005 in Las Vegas Quarter-final	Las Vegas, Nevada	No contest	1	?
Match resulted in a no contest due to an injury to Yusuke Fujimoto - Carter Williams advanced due to the Survivor Rule.
2004-02-15	Loss	(Brazil) Montanha Silva	K-1 Burning 2004	Ginowan, Japan	KO (right cross)	3	1:04
2003-12-31	Win	(South Africa) Francois Botha	K-1 PREMIUM 2003 Dynamite!!	Nagoya, Japan	Decision (unanimous)	3	3:00
2003-12-06	Win	(France) Matthias Riccio	K-1 World Grand Prix 2003 Final Opening-fight	Tokyo, Japan	KO (left hook)	2	2:34
2003-09-21	Loss	(Japan) Musashi	K-1 Survival 2003 Japan Grand Prix Final Final	Yokohama, Japan	Decision (majority 0-2)	Ex 1 (4)	3:00
2003-09-21	Win	(Japan) Hiromi Amada	K-1 Survival 2003 Japan Grand Prix Final Semi-final	Yokohama, Japan	Decision (unanimous)	3	3:00
2003-09-21	Win	(Japan) Nobu Hayashi	K-1 Survival 2003 Japan Grand Prix Final Quarter-final	Yokohama, Japan	Decision (split 2-1)	Ex 1 (4)	3:00
2003-09-21	Loss	(United States) Eric Esch	K-1 Beast II 2003	Saitama, Japan	KO (left hook)	1	1:02
2003-06-29	Loss	(United States) Carter Williams	K-1 World Grand Prix 2003 in Las Vegas Semi-final	Las Vegas, Nevada	TKO (right hook/2 knockdowns)	2	2:26
2003-05-03	Win	(United States) Dewey Cooper	K-1 World Grand Prix 2003 in Las Vegas Quarter-final	Las Vegas, Nevada	Decision (majority 2-0)	3	3:00
2003-04-06	Win	(New Zealand) Kerri Karena	K-1 Beast 2003	Yamagata, Japan	KO (right cross)	3	1:20
2002-09-22	Loss	(Japan) Tsuyoshi Nakasako	K-1 Andy Spirits Japan GP 2002 Final Semi-final	Osaka, Japan	KO (left hook)	2	2:18
2002-09-22	Win	(Japan) Toru Oishi	K-1 Andy Spirits Japan GP 2002 Final Quarter-final	Osaka, Japan	KO (left high kick)	3	1:47
2002-08-10	Loss	(New Zealand) Rony Sefo	Ichigeki	Urayasu, Japan	KO (right uppercut/3 knockdowns)	1	2:51
2002-07-14	Win	(Japan) Ryo Takigawa	K-1 World Grand Prix 2002 in Fukuoka	Fukuoka, Japan	KO (left cross)	1	3:00
2002-01-27	Win	(Tonga) Cedric Kongaika	K-1 Rising 2002	Shizuoka, Japan	Decision (unanimous)	5	3:00
2001-08-19	Loss	(Denmark) Nicholas Pettas	K-1 Andy Memorial 2001 Japan GP Final Quarter-final	Saitama, Japan	KO (right low kick)	1	2:57
2001-06-24	Win	(Japan) Noboru Uchida	K-1 Survival 2001	Sendai, Japan	KO	Ex 1R (4)	1:15
2001-04-15	Win	(Japan) Yasuhiro Anbe	K-1 Burning 2001	Kumamoto, Japan	Decision (unanimous)	3	3:00
2000-11-19	Loss	(United Kingdom) Ricky Nickolson	K-1 UK Global Heat 2000	Birmingham, England	KO (right hook)	2	0:33
2000-10-09	Win	(Japan) Shinji Yoda	K-1 World Grand Prix 2000 in Fukuoka	Fukuoka, Japan	KO (right low kick)	2	2:54
2000-07-07	Win	(Japan) Issei Nakai	K-1 Spirits 2000	Sendai, Japan	Decision (unanimous)	3	3:00
2000-03-19	Win	(Japan) Ryo Takigawa	K-1 Burning 2000	Yokohama, Japan	KO (right cross/3 knockdowns)	2	1:10
2000-01-25	Win	(Japan) Masanobu Yamanaka	K-1 Rising 2000 Pro debut fight	Nagasaki, Japan	TKO	2	0:36

Amateur kickboxing record
5 wins, 0 losses, 0 draws
Date	Result	Opponent	Event	Location	Method	Round	Time
2000-09-03	Win	(Japan) Masanobu Yamanaka	Monster Challenge 2000 Japan Open "The Road to K-1" K-2 Tournament Heavyweight Final	Tokyo, Japan	Decision (4-0)	1	3:00
Winning K-2 Tournament Heavyweight Championship.
2000-09-03	Win	(Japan) Tatsunori Momose	Monster Challenge 2000 Japan Open "The Road to K-1" K-2 Tournament Heavyweight Semi-final	Tokyo, Japan	KO (left middle kick)		
Legend: Win Loss Draw/no contest Notes

== See also ==
- List of male kickboxers
- List of K-1 events
