= Junichi Sawayashiki =

Japanese kickboxer

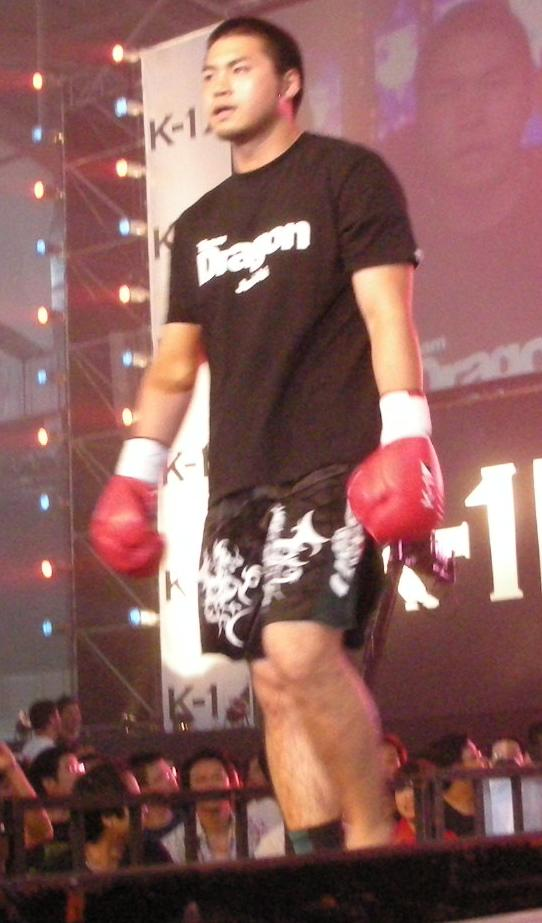
- Born: Junichi Sawayashiki; September 13, 1984 (age 42); Tokyo, Japan
- Native name: 澤屋敷純一
- Nationality: Japanese
- Height: 1.84 m (6 ft 0 in)
- Weight: 101.5 kg (224 lb; 15.98 st)
- Division: Heavyweight
- Style: Judo, kickboxing
- Team: Team Dragon
- Years active: 2004–2009

Kickboxing record
- Total: 23
- Wins: 15
- By knockout: 10
- Losses: 8
- By knockout: 5

Junichi Sawayashiki (澤屋敷 純一, Sawayashiki Jun'ichi; born September 13, 1984) is a Japanese heavyweight kickboxer from Tokyo, currently competing in K-1.

== Biography ==
Sawayashiki, at only 19 years old, turned pro in 2004 and started fighting for R.I.S.E. kickboxing promotion in Japan. He made his K-1 debut on December 2, 2006, at the K-1 WGP 2006 Final undercard, against Mitsugu Noda, winning the fight by split decision.

On his next fight in Yokohama he stunned the K-1 world by a convincing victory over French kickboxing legend Jerome Le Banner.

After three consecutive wins at Yokohama, Hawaii and Amsterdam Sawayashiki earned himself a wildcard entry to the K-1 Final Elimination against the K-1 Asia winner Yusuke Fujimoto. After having his nose broken in the first round, Sawayashiki fought on and knocked down Fujimoto three times in the third round before referee stopped the fight.

His next fight was at the K-1 World GP 2007 Final against 3-Time World Champion, Peter Aerts. He suffered his first K-1 loss by first round Knockout after taking a tremendous right punch to the face. Sawayashiki's career went downhill from there, losing 4 more straight fights in a row, 3 KO losses to Musashi, Cătălin Moroșanu and Glaube Feitosa plus a punishing three round fight against Jerome Lebanner in the 2008 Final 16. Many now consider Sawayashiki's career short lived and likely over.

== Titles ==
- 2006 3rd J-NETWORK Heavyweight champion (May 17, 2006 - June 18, 2007)

== Kickboxing record ==
15 Wins (10 (T)KO's, 5 decisions), 8 Losses
Date	Result	Opponent	Event	Method	Round	Time
03/28/2009	Loss	(Brazil) Glaube Feitosa	K-1 World GP 2009 in Yokohama, Yokohama, Japan	KO (Left Straight Punch)	2	0:48
09/27/2008	Loss	(France) Jérôme Le Banner	K-1 World GP 2008 Final 16, Seoul, Korea	Decision	3	3:00
07/13/2008	Loss	(Romania) Cătălin Moroșanu	K-1 World GP 2008 in Taipei, Taipei City, Taiwan	KO (Left hook)	1	2:04
04/13/2008	Loss	(Japan) Musashi	K-1 World GP 2008 in Yokohama, Japan	KO (Left straight punch)	2	2:16
12/08/2007	Loss	(Netherlands) Peter Aerts	K-1 World GP 2007 Final, Japan	KO (Right Cross)	1	1:29
09/29/2007	Win	(Japan) Yusuke Fujimoto	K-1 World GP 2007 Final Elimination, Korea	TKO (Referee stoppage)	2	1:38
06/23/2007	Win	(France) Nicolas Vermont	K-1 World GP 2007 in Amsterdam, Netherlands	TKO (Referee stoppage)	2	1:05
04/28/2007	Win	(South Korea) Randy Kim	K-1 World Grand Prix 2007 in Hawaii, USA	KO (Punches)	2	2:52
03/04/2007	Win	(France) Jérôme Le Banner	K-1 World Grand Prix 2007 in Yokohama, Japan	Unanimous Decision	3	3:00
12/02/2006	Win	(Japan) Mitsugu Noda	K-1 World GP 2006 Final, Japan	Split Decision	3	3:00
07/30/2006	Win	(Japan) Tatsunori Momose	R.I.S.E. XXVIII, Japan	KO	2	2:46
05/17/2006	Win	(Japan) Nobutaka Baba	GO! GO! J-NET '06 ～Invading the DRAGON～, Japan	TKO (Doctor stoppage)	3	0:31
03/26/2006	Loss	(Japan) Yuki	R.I.S.E. G-Bazooka Tournament '06, Japan	KO	1	1:21
01/29/2006	Win	(Japan) Koji Ina	R.I.S.E. XXII, Japan	Unanimous Decision	3	3:00
11/27/2005	Win	(Japan) Yasunari Hasegawa	R.I.S.E. XX, Japan	KO	2	1:26
09/21/2005	Win	(Japan) Takehiro Ikeda	GO! GO! J-NET '05 ～Sky High～, Japan	KO	1	1:47
08/28/2005	Win	(Japan) Atsushi Sato	R.I.S.E. XVIII, Japan	TKO	1	2:27
06/19/2005	Loss	(Brazil) Fabiano Aoki	R.I.S.E. G-Bazooka Tournament '05, Japan	Unanimous Decision	3	3:00
01/30/2005	Win	(Japan) Masanobu Yamanaka	R.I.S.E. XII, Japan	KO	3	1:56
10/31/2004	Loss	(United Kingdom) Will Riva	R.I.S.E. X, Japan	Unanimous Decision	3	3:00
07/04/2004	Win	(Japan) Ikeda	R.I.S.E. The Low of The Ring, Japan	Unanimous Decision	2	3:00
04/29/2004	Win	(Japan) Mitsunori Tanimura	R.I.S.E. VII, Japan	Majority Decision	3	3:00
02/11/2004	Win	(Japan) Ray Okamoto	R.I.S.E. VI, Japan	KO	3	1:08

== See also ==
- List of male kickboxers
- List of K-1 events
