= Oh! My Zombie Mermaid =

- Ā! Ikken'ya Puroresu
- Directed by: Naoki Kudo
- Written by: Izō Hashimoto; Naoki Kudo
- Starring: Shinya Hashimoto; Sonim; Shirō Sano; Nicholas Pettas
- Production company: Soft on Demand
- Distributed by: Soft on Demand
- Release date: February 21, 2004 (YIFFF)
- Running time: 100 minutes
- Country: Japan
- Language: Japanese

Oh! My Zombie Mermaid (あゝ!一軒家プロレス, Ā! Ikken'ya Puroresu) is a 2004 Japanese action comedy film directed by Naoki Kudo, written by Naoki Kudo and Izō Hashimoto, and starring Shinya Hashimoto, Sonim, Shirō Sano, and Nicholas Pettas. Hashimoto plays a professional wrestler whose wife involuntarily turns into a mermaid.

== Plot ==
Shishioh, a popular and successful professional wrestler, builds a large mansion for his wife Asami and their kids. During the housewarming party, Ichijo, an angry competitor, causes a riot that destroys the house. Asami is hospitalized, where she contracts a rare virus that slowly transforms her into a mermaid. Desperate for money to finance his new house and find a cure for Asami, Shishioh agrees to a reality TV show in which he wrestles several competitors in a haunted house. His opponents turn out to be homicidal killers and include a zombie among them. Eventually, Shishioh learns that the television producer infected Asami with an experimental virus in order to get him to compete.

== Cast ==
- Shinya Hashimoto as Kouta Shishioh
- Sonim as Nami
- Shiro Sano as Yamaji
- Nicholas Pettas as Ichijoh
- Urara Awata as Asami
- April Hunter

== Release ==
Oh! My Zombie Mermaid premiered at the Yubari International Fantastic Film Festival on February 21, 2004.

Discotek Media purchased the North American distribution rights and released it in North America on July 28, 2009.

== Reception ==
Todd Brown of Twitch Film wrote that the first half takes itself too seriously, but the second half is "pure, ridiculous, campy joy to watch." Bill Gibron of DVD Talk rated it 4.5/5 stars and called it "a true work of baffling genius." In The Zombie Movie Encyclopedia, academic Peter Dendle wrote, "The film is fairly entertaining, and keeps providing narrative and conceptual twists every step along the way."
