= Jérôme Le Banner =

French kickboxer

Jérôme Philippe Le Banner
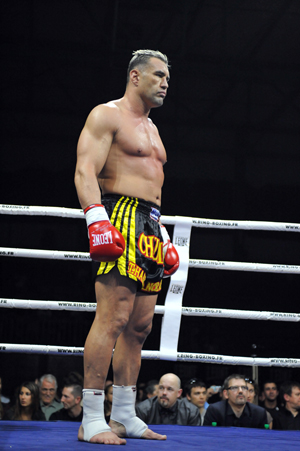
- Born: 26 December 1972 (age 53); Le Havre, France
- Other names: Geronimo; Hyper Battle Cyborg; The Bulldog of Normandy; The Uncrowned King
- Height: 6 ft 3 in (191 cm)
- Weight: 264 lb (120 kg; 18 st 12 lb)
- Division: Heavyweight (kickboxing); Heavyweight (MMA, boxing)
- Reach: 79.0 in (201 cm)
- Style: Muay Thai
- Stance: Southpaw
- Fighting out of: Étretat, Seine-Maritime, France
- Team: MMA Factory; Borboel & Tosa Gym; Le Banner Xtream Team; Chakuriki Gym
- Rank: Black belt in Kyokushin; Black belt in Judo; White belt in Brazilian jiu-jitsu
- Wrestling: 6
- Years active: 1992–present (kickboxing); 1998–present (boxing); 2001–present (MMA); 2011–2014 (wrestling)

Professional boxing record
- Total: 6
- Wins: 6
- By knockout: 5
- Losses: 0

Kickboxing record
- Total: 113
- Wins: 87
- By knockout: 71
- Losses: 23
- By knockout: 14
- Draws: 2
- No contests: 1

Mixed martial arts record
- Total: 9
- Wins: 6
- By knockout: 5
- By submission: 1
- Losses: 3
- By submission: 2
- By decision: 1

Other information
- Website: http://www.lebannerofficial.com
- Boxing record from BoxRec
- Mixed martial arts record from Sherdog

Jérôme Philippe Le Banner (French pronunciation: [ʒeʁom filip lə banɛʁ]; born December 26, 1972) is a French kickboxer, mixed martial artist, and professional wrestler. Le Banner fought for most of his career in K-1 and became known for his aggressive fighting style and knockout power. He is a 2-time K-1 World Grand Prix runner up, a 2-time K-1 Preliminary Grand Prix champion, and is a multiple-time world champion in Kickboxing and Muay Thai.

== Background ==
Jérôme Le Banner was born in the French city of Le Havre, in the région of Normandy and began training in judo at the age of five. When he was fourteen, Bruce Lee's Fist of Fury influenced him so much that he became interested in striking instead and started trying to incorporate the techniques of Jeet Kune Do he had seen in the film. At sixteen however he started practising kyokushin, while Jeet Kune Do gave him the southpaw stance which he has maintained throughout his career, even though he is right-handed. He eventually took up Muay Thai at the age of 18. Le Banner holds a black belt in the Kyokushin Kaikan karate and in judo.

== Career ==
=== Early career ===
At the age of 18, he debuted in his first full contact kickboxing competitions. By 19 he held the ISKA French title and soon after that, he won the European belt against Andy Mayo, and the Intercontinental belt in South Africa against Mike Bernardo. He turned down the chance to fight Richard Vince for the IKL World Kickboxing title at the age of 21.

=== K-1 debut ===
On March 3, 1995, Jerome Le Banner made his K-1 debut, winning a five-round decision over Nokweed Davy. Le Banner was at 107 kg while Nokweed was at 74 kg. Two months later, on May 4, 1995, he made his first K-1 World Grand Prix appearance in Tokyo, Japan, knocking out both Masaaki Satake and Mike Bernardo, before losing to Peter Aerts in the tournament finals.

=== First world title shot ===
After the 1995 K-1 GP, Le Banner was drafted by the French Army, and also had trouble with his trainer so he could not train for a year. His conscription ended in April 1996. He also hired a new trainer.

On June 1, 1996, in Paris, Le Banner won the ISKA Muay Thai World Super Heavyweight Championship against Curtis Schuster.

On October 18, K-1 Star Wars '96, Le Banner beat Ernesto Hoost via second-round knockout.

=== K-1 and boxing ===
During 1997 Le Banner had trouble with his trainer again. As a result, Le Banner contracted former Christophe Tiozzo's promoter Jean-Christophe Courrèges. In 1998, Le Banner contracted boxing promoter Don King and well-known boxing trainer Don Turner. He was training with Evander Holyfield.

On July 18, K-1 DREAM '98, Le Banner fought against Sam Greco. Le Banner was knocked down in the first round but managed to knock Greco out in the second round.

On September 19, Le Banner fought in Evander Holyfield vs Vaughn Bean's undercard. Le Banner beat Espedito da Silva via first-round knockout by high kick, to become WKN Muay Thai world super heavyweight champion.

Le Banner's pro boxing record was 6 fights, 6 wins, 5 KOs, 1 win by DQ. He was supposed to fight under boxing rules in the Madison Square Garden on February and March 1999, but had trouble with Don King about his contract so these matches were cancelled by King.

=== Return to K-1 ===
Le Banner could not fight both kickboxing and boxing due to contract problems. In 1999, K-1 producer Kazuyoshi Ishii solved his contract problem so that he could return to K-1.

On October 3, K-1 World Grand Prix '99 opening round, Le Banner fought against Matt Skelton. Skelton became pro boxing WBA world Heavyweight title contender, WBO world Heavyweight number 5 contender. Skelton had never been knocked down by punches in his fighting career but Le Banner dominated Skelton with his boxing skills and knocked out Skelton in the first round.

=== Matches of K-1 GP 99 final ===
On December 5, at the Tokyo Dome, K-1 Grand Prix '99 final round, Le Banner fought against three-time defending K-1 GP champion Peter Aerts in the quarter-final. Le Banner wanted to have Aerts as his opponent in the tournament draw. Le Banner was knocked down by Aerts's high kick but managed to knock out Aerts by left hook at 1:11 of the first round. In the semifinal, Le Banner fought Ernesto Hoost. Le Banner dominated Hoost in the first round but lost by KO in the second round.

=== "The biggest KO of this thousand years" ===
On April 23, 2000, at K-1 The Millennium, Le Banner fought against Kyokushin World Open Karate Tournament 1999 champion Francisco Filho. Just 1 year before from this match, Filho had beat 1999 K-1 GP champion Ernesto Hoost by knockout. But Le Banner knocked out Filho unconscious with a left straight punch in the first round. This knock out is called "The biggest KO of this thousand years" (or the Millennium KO) by the ringside announcers and Japanese media. Le Banner's left arm and left punch have been called the "Golden Left" since this match.

On July 30, Le Banner beat Mark Hunt, Nicholas Pettas and Ernesto Hoost, to become K-1 World Grand Prix 2000 in Nagoya tournament Champion. But he was not able to fight in K-1 World Grand Prix 2000 Final due to illness from Infectious mononucleosis.

On April 29, 2001, Le Banner won the K-1 World Grand Prix tournament by three first-round KOs, the fastest win in K-1 history in a total time of 4 minutes and 4 seconds in K-1 World Grand Prix 2001 in Osaka.

On December 8, Le Banner lost to Mark Hunt by KO in K-1 World Grand Prix 2001 Final quarter-finals. The match is one of the biggest upsets ever in K-1. After this event, Japanese combat sports magazine SRS-DX published a picture of the moment Hunt hit Le Banner's face with an elbow; however, this didn't change the match's result into disqualification.

=== Rubber match against Hunt in Paris ===
In 2002, Le Banner had begun to train with Stéphane Nikiéma. On May 25, 2002, Le Banner fought Mark Hunt at K-1 World Grand Prix 2002 in Paris in a rubber match. In the 2nd round, first Hunt was knocked down by Le Banner's counterpunch. Le Banner was also knocked down. In the last 5 seconds of the 2nd round Le Banner knocked down Hunt with a high kick, winning by TKO.

=== K-1 World GP 2002 final ===
On December 7, 2002, at K-1 World Grand Prix 2002, after defeating Musashi in the quarterfinals, and Mark Hunt in the semis, Le Banner faced three-time World Champion Ernesto Hoost in the tournament final. Following an evenly fought first two rounds, Hoost fractured Le Banner's left arm with three round kicks in the third round. This match was stopped by 3-knock down rule. Referee Nobuaki Kakuda was severely criticized that he didn't stop the match or ask a doctor to check LeBanner when he was first knocked down. Le Banner suffered a near career-ending injury (a steel rod and eleven pins were inserted into his arm).

=== After broken left arm ===
Le Banner was able to recover and returned to the ring six months later in K-1 Paris 2003, winning the fight by punch combinations over Belarusian Vitali Akhramenko.

On March 26, 2005, Le Banner knocked Yoshihiro Akiyama out by knee kick in MMA rule at Hero's 1.

On May 13, 2006, at K-1 World Grand Prix 2006 in Amsterdam, Le Banner fought against two-time K-1 world GP champion Remy Bonjasky. The fight was rather controversial as Bonjasky won the fight in a majority decision by all Dutch judges despite being dominated in this fight. On June 30, 2006, K-1 judges admitted the decision was a mistake, and this match's result was officially changed to "Le Banner defeated Bonjasky by unanimous decision (30–29)".

In 2006, Le Banner announced that he hoped to fight against then UFC heavyweight world champion Tim Sylvia under UFC rules.

On December 2, 2006, after his loss against Semmy Schilt at K-1 World Grand Prix 2006 finals, Le Banner announced he was considering his semi retirement from tournament fighting, restricting future appearances to K-1's Superfight events.

In early 2007, after his fight at K-1 World GP 2007 in Yokohama he was forced to have knee surgery and was not expected to return to the ring until 2008; however due to a fast recovery K-1 announced that Le Banner would participate on September 29, 2007, at the K-1 World GP 2007 in Seoul Final 16 against Russian kickboxer Ruslan Karaev. Just two days before the fight, Karaev had to pull out and was replaced by a former Korean Taekwondo practitioner, Yong Soo Park. It took Le Banner only 0'54" seconds to knock out Park in the first round with a straight punch and qualify himself for the K-1 World GP 2007 Final held on December 8, 2007, held at the Yokohama Arena, Japan.

On December 8, 2007, in the ninth K-1 World GP appearance of his career, Le Banner defeated Choi Hong-man in the quarter-finals by unanimous decision before facing the reigning K-1 champion Semmy Schilt in the semis. Le Banner finished the first round up on scorecards. In the beginning of the second round Schilt landed a low kick that seemed to hurt Le Banner's right knee, on which he had surgery in early 2007. The fight was eventually stopped by Le Banner's corner throwing the towel to avoid further damage to the injured knee.

Jerome fought Schilt again at the K-1 World GP 2008 in Fukuoka for the K-1 Super-Heavyweight title. Jerome ended up losing a controversial majority decision.

As a finalist Jerome fought at the K-1 World GP 2008 Final 16 against the young Japanese fighter, Junichi Sawayashiki. Although Jerome was unable to knock the young fighter out, he won a unanimous decision. At the finals Jerome lost by TKO to the eventual champion Remy Bonjasky when the previously broken left arm was troubling him again.

On September 26 Jerome fought Japanese rival Musashi at the K-1 World Grand Prix 2009 Final 16. Jerome knocked down the Japanese veteran to claim a unanimous decision. In his eleventh appearance at the K-1 World Grand Prix Final Championship he fought Semmy Schilt. Jerome lost to Semmy for the 4th time in his career by first-round TKO. After the fight, Jerome stated that he planned to continue to fight in the World Grand Prix Final even though there was suspicion before the fight that this would be his last World Grand Prix appearance.

=== Join Chakuriki Gym ===
In 2010, Le Banner announced his motivation to fight again, and joined Chakuriki Gym in Amsterdam. On April 3 at K-1 World Grand Prix 2010 in Yokohama, Le Banner beat Tyrone Spong by unanimous decision.

On July 23, during a France vs Thailand event in Stade de l'Est, Réunion, he won the W.P.M.F. Muay Thai World Super Heavyweight title, beating the Canadian Tomas Novack by KO in the fifth round.

On October 2, he fought again in the final 16 of the 2010 tournament. Le Banner fought against K-1 Heavyweight champion Kyotaro in the opening round. After a close three rounds where round one was called a draw, round two was given to Jerome, and round three was given to Kyotaro, the fight was sent to an extra round. Jerome disagreed with the judges ruling on the third round and left the ring.

Le Banner fought Summer Olympic Games 2008 Judo Gold medalist Satoshi Ishii in a mixed martial arts rules bout at DREAM's Dynamite!! 2010 New Year's Eve event in Japan. LeBanner had an MMA record of 3–1–1 heading into the fight. However, LeBanner lost the fight via unanimous decision.

=== GLORY, WSOF and charity match of IGF Pro Wrestling for victim of Japan ===
In 2011, Le Banner won two new world titles in Freestyle Kickboxing rules.

On June 11, at the 8ème Nuit des Sports de Combat in Geneva, he faced for the second time the German Stefan Leko and won by unanimous decision to become the I.S.K.A. World Super Heavyweight champion.

To end the year, he fought for the first time in Pattaya, Thailand, on December 30, for the World Pro League Super Heavyweight title. Le Banner won this fight by liver kick knockout in the third round.

In parallel, he fought a Pro Wrestling charity match for victims of 2011 Tōhoku earthquake and tsunami and Fukushima Daiichi nuclear disaster at Inoki Genome Federation. He became IGF Champion and defended the title five times, before losing it to Kazuyuki Fujita on July 14, 2012. He won his six fights in Pro Wrestling by (T)KO against Shinichi Suzukawa, Erik Hammer, Kazuyuki Fujita, Montanha Silva, Josh Barnett and Tim Sylvia. On December 4, 2011, at IGF – Fighting Spirit Festival in Iwaki, Fukushima, he faced in a kickboxing charity exhibition match Japanese kickboxer Masayoshi Kakutani and won by TKO in the first round.

He began to train in MMA in the US in November 2011. He was scheduled to fight Marcin Różalski at the Main Event of the KSW 18 on February 25. However, a knee injury forced Le Banner off the card. This match was postponed for KSW 20 on September 15. But, Le Banner was again forced out of this bout due to an injured knee.

Le Banner supposed to fight GLORY 16-man tournament at Glory 4: Tokyo - 2012 Heavyweight Grand Slam in Saitama, Japan on December 31, 2012. But, his knee injury didn't recover completely for this tournament yet. So, he fought Koichi Pettas in a non-tournament bout at this event and won by Knockout in third round.

He contracted with his rival & friend Ray Sefo's organization MMA World Series of Fighting.

He rematched Koichi Pettas at Glory 8: Tokyo - 2013 65kg Slam in Tokyo, Japan on May 3, 2013, and won by unanimous decision.

Le Banner defeated Roman Kleibl via TKO due to a broken arm in round two of their contest at Time Fight 3 in Tours, France on June 15, 2013.

He was to face James Smith at Fight Night Saint Tropez in Saint-Tropez, France on August 4, 2013 but Smith was replaced by Vitali Akhramenko. Le Banner knocked Akhramenko out in round two for the W.K.N. Kickboxing Oriental World Super Heavyweight title.

He was set to fight Sergei Kharitonov at Glory 10: Los Angeles – 2013 85kg Slam in Ontario, California, United States on September 28, 2013 but withdrew after suffering a neck injury.

Le Banner knocked out Zinedine Hameur-Lain in round two at La 20ème Nuit des Champions in Marseille, France on November 23, 2013.

The Sergei Kharitonov fight was rescheduled for Glory 13: Tokyo - Welterweight World Championship Tournament in Tokyo, Japan on December 21, 2013. Le Banner lost by unanimous decision.

He beat Lucian Danilencu via second-round KO at Final Fight – Retour aux sources in Le Havre, France on May 30, 2014.

He defeated Colin George at Fight Night Saint-Tropez II in Saint-Tropez, France on August 4, 2014.

Le Banner returned at Mixed Martial Arts Grand Prix: The Last of Kings on June 4, 2022, to face Ivan Vičić in a MMA bout. He won the fight via a rear-naked choke submission in the first round.

He made another journey to MMA, facing Adnan Alić on October 8, 2022 at MMA GP: Évolution, winning the bout in the first round after Adnan submitted to ground and pound.

Le Banner returned to Kickboxing at KNUCKLE'S 16, on June 30, 2024. He faced Yuki Kaneeda, and won via KO in the second round.

Le Banner made his K-1 return after a 14 year absence, at the K-1 World Grand Prix in Osaka, on October 5, 2024. He faced former K-1 Cruiserweight Champion K-JEE in a Qualifier for the K-1 World Grand Prix 2024 Final. He lost the bout via KO in the first round, getting dropped and stopped by a high kick from K-JEE. Le Banner announced his retirement from all competition at the press conference afterwards.

== Championships and accomplishments ==
=== Kickboxing and Muay thai ===
- World Kickboxing Network
  - 2012 W.K.N. Kickboxing World Super Heavyweight Champion
    - Three successful title defenses
  - 1998 W.K.N. Muaythai World Super Heavyweight Champion
    - One successful title defense
- International Sport Karate Association
  - 2015 I.S.K.A. K1 rules World Super Heavyweight title
  - 2011 I.S.K.A. Freestyle Kickboxing World Super Heavyweight Champion
  - 1996 I.S.K.A. Muaythai World Super Heavyweight Champion
    - Three title defenses
  - 1994 I.S.K.A. Full Contact Intercontinental Super Heavyweight Champion
  - 1994 I.S.K.A. Full Contact European Super Heavyweight Champion
  - 1992 I.S.K.A. Full Contact French Super Heavyweight Champion
- World Pro League Kickboxing
  - 2011 World Pro League Kickboxing Super Heavyweight Champion
- World Professional Muaythai Federation
  - 2010 W.P.M.F. Muaythai World Super Heavyweight Champion
- K-1
  - 2007 K-1 World Grand Prix Final third place
  - 2002 K-1 World Grand Prix Final runner-up
  - 2001 K-1 World Grand Prix in Osaka champion
  - 2000 K-1 World Grand Prix in Nagoya champion
  - 1999 K-1 World Grand Prix Final 3rd place
  - 1995 K-1 World Grand Prix Final runner-up
- RCFA
  - 1994 R.C.F.A. World Super Heavyweight Champion
- FFUBADA
  - 1992 FFUBADA French Cup Full Contact Champion (−91 kg)
  - 1990 FFUBADA Full Contact French Junior Champion

Awards

- 2009 Pantheon of Sports and Martial Arts Hall of Fame in Tokyo
- 2007 K-1 World GP 2007 Final MVP and best fight of the tournament (vs.Choi Hong-man)
- 1999 Fuji Television Best fight of the K-1 World GP 1999 Final (vs.Peter Aerts)
- 1997 Fuji Television and Special Ringside Magazine Best fight of the K-1 Grand Prix '97 first round in Osaka (vs. Rick Roufus)
- 1997 Gold Katana of the best Muaythai fighter at 12th Martial arts Festival, Paris, Bercy

=== Professional wrestling ===
- Inoki Genome Federation
  - IGF Championship (1 time, inaugural)

== Kickboxing record ==
Kickboxing record
87 wins (71 (T)KOs), 23 losses, 2 draws, 1 no contest
Date	Result	Opponent	Event	Location	Method	Round	Time	Record
2024-10-05	Loss	(Japan) K-Jee	K-1 World GP 2024 in Osaka	Osaka, Japan	KO (high kick)	1	1:26	87-23–2–1
K-1 World Grand Prix 2024 Final Qualifier.
2024-06-30	Win	(Japan) Yuki Kaneeda	KNUCKLE’S 16	Kumamoto, Japan	KO	2	1:39	87–22–2–1
2019-12-15	Win	(Russia) Viacheslav Datsik	World Cup TNA Fights	Kazan, Russia	KO (left middle kick)	2		86–22–2–1
2019-07-28	Win	(South Korea) Jun Soo Lim	HEAT 45	Nagoya, Japan	KO	2	2:15	85–22–2–1
2019-04-19	Win	(Serbia) Adnan Alic	Bulldog Media Fight Night 2.0	Gothenburg, Sweden	TKO	1	2:02	84–22–2–1
2019-03-02	Win	(Brazil) Jairo Kusunoki	HEAT 44	Nagoya, Japan	KO (low kicks)	2	2:47	83–22–2–1
2018-10-27	Win	(Poland) Wojciech Buliński	Fight Legend Geneva	Geneva, Switzerland	TKO (3 knockdowns)	1		82–22–2–1
2015-08-04	Win	(United States) Karl Roberson	Fight Night Saint-Tropez III	Saint Tropez, France	Decision (unanimous)	5	2:00	81–22–2–1
Retains W.K.N. Kickboxing OR World Super Heavyweight title (+96.600 kg).
2015-04-25	Win	(Italy) Claudio Istrate	Final Fight 2	Évreux, France	KO (left knee to the body)	2	0:53	80–22–2–1
Wins I.S.K.A. K1 rules World Super Heavyweight title.
2014-08-04	Win	(Netherlands) Colin George	Fight Night Saint-Tropez II	Saint-Tropez, France	KO (left liver kick)	2	0:23	79–22–2–1
2014-05-30	Win	(Romania) Lucian Danilencu	Final Fight – Retour aux sources	Le Havre, France	KO (right hook to the body)	2	0:48	78–22–2–1
2013-12-21	Loss	(Russia) Sergei Kharitonov	Glory 13: Tokyo	Tokyo, Japan	Decision (unanimous)	3	3:00	77–22–2–1
2013-11-23	Win	(Algeria) Zinedine Hameur-Lain	La 20ème Nuit des Champions	Marseilles, France	KO (right body shot)	2	0:40	77–21–2–1
2013-08-04	Win	(Belarus) Vitali Akhramenko	Fight Night Saint-Tropez	Saint-Tropez, France	TKO (ref. stop/right low kick)	2	1:42	76–21–2–1
Retains W.K.N. Kickboxing OR World Super Heavyweight title (+96.600 kg).
2013-06-15	Win	(Czech Republic) Roman Kleibl	Time Fight 3	Tours, France	TKO (ref. stop/left middle kick)	2	1:00	75–21–2–1
2013-05-03	Win	(Japan) Koichi Watanabe	Glory 8: Tokyo	Tokyo, Japan	Decision (unanimous)	3	3:00	74–21–2–1
2012-12-31	Win	(Japan) Koichi Watanabe	Glory 4: Tokyo	Saitama, Japan	KO (right hook)	3	2:48	73–21–2–1
2012-04-28	Draw	(Lithuania) Arnold Oborotov	Le Banner Series Acte 1	Geneva, Switzerland	Decision draw	5	2:00	72–21–2–1
Retains W.K.N. Kickboxing OR World Super Heavyweight title (+96.600 kg).
2012-03-23	Loss	(Netherlands) Errol Zimmerman	United Glory 15	Moscow, Russia	TKO (3 knockdowns rule)	1	2:21	72–21–1–1
2011-12-30	Win	(Russia) Andrei Kirsanov	Gladiator's War – Le Banner Tour – First Fight	Pattaya, Thailand	KO (liver kick)	3	1:19	72–20–1–1
Wins Vacant World Pro League Kickboxing Super Heavyweight title.
2011-12-04	Ex	(Japan) Masayoshi Kakutani	IGF – Fighting Spirit Festival in Iwaki, Exhibition match	Iwaki, Japan	TKO (ref stop/3 knockdowns)	1	2:19	
2011-06-11	Win	(Germany) Stefan Leko	8ème Nuit des Sports de Combat	Geneva, Switzerland	Decision (unanimous)	5	2:00	71–20–1–1
Wins I.S.K.A. Freestyle Kickboxing World Super Heavyweight title.
2010-10-02	Loss	(Japan) Kyotaro Fujimoto	K-1 World Grand Prix 2010 in Seoul Final 16	Seoul, South Korea	Forfeit	4	0:00	70–20–1–1
Fails to qualify for K-1 World Grand Prix 2010 final.
2010-07-23	Win	(Canada) Tomas Novack	Muay-Thaï France vs Thaïland	Stade de l'Est, Réunion	KO (right hook)	5	2:56	70–19–1–1
Wins W.P.M.F. Muaythai World Super Heavyweight title (+91 kg).
2010-04-03	Win	(Suriname) Tyrone Spong	K-1 World Grand Prix 2010 in Yokohama	Yokohama, Japan	Decision (unanimous)	3	3:00	69–19–1–1
2009-12-05	Loss	(Netherlands) Semmy Schilt	K-1 World Grand Prix 2009 Final, Quarter-finals	Yokohama, Japan	TKO (left front kick)	1	1:27	68–19–1–1
2009-09-26	Win	(Japan) Musashi	K-1 World Grand Prix 2009 Final 16	Seoul, South Korea	Decision (unanimous)	3	3:00	68–18–1–1
Qualifies for K-1 Grand Prix '09 final.
2009-03-28	Loss	(Brazil) Ewerton Teixeira	K-1 World GP 2009 in Yokohama	Yokohama, Japan	2 ext R. decision (split)	5	3:00	67–18–1–1
2008-12-06	Loss	(Netherlands) Remy Bonjasky	K-1 World GP 2008 Final, Quarter-finals	Yokohama, Japan	TKO (arm injury)	3	1:56	67–17–1–1
2008-09-27	Win	(Japan) Junichi Sawayashiki	K-1 World GP 2008 Final 16	Seoul, Korea	Decision (unanimous)	3	3:00	67–16–1–1
Qualifies for K-1 Grand Prix '08 final.
2008-06-29	Loss	(Netherlands) Semmy Schilt	K-1 World GP 2008 in Fukuoka	Fukuoka, Japan	Decision (majority)	3	3:00	66–16–1–1
Fight was for K-1 Super Heavyweight title.
2007-12-08	Loss	(Netherlands) Semmy Schilt	K-1 World GP 2007 Final, Semi-finals	Yokohama, Japan	TKO (leg injury)	2	1:02	66–15–1–1
2007-12-08	Win	(South Korea) Choi Hong-man	K-1 World GP 2007 Final, Quarter-finals	Yokohama, Japan	Decision (unanimous)	3	3:00	66–14–1–1
2007-09-29	Win	(South Korea) Yong Soo Park	K-1 World GP 2007 in Seoul Final 16	Seoul, Korea	KO (right punch)	1	0:54	65–14–1–1
Qualifies for K-1 Grand Prix '07 final.
2007-03-04	Loss	(Japan) Junichi Sawayashiki	K-1 World GP 2007 in Yokohama	Yokohama, Japan	Decision (unanimous)	3	3:00	64–14–1–1
2006-12-02	Loss	(Netherlands) Semmy Schilt	K-1 World Grand Prix 2006, Quarter-finals	Tokyo, Japan	Decision (unanimous)	3	3:00	64–13–1–1
2006-09-30	Win	(South Korea) Choi Hong-man	K-1 World Grand Prix 2006 in Osaka opening round	Osaka, Japan	Ext.R decision (unanimous)	4	3:00	64–12–1–1
Qualifies for K-1 Grand Prix '06 final.
2006-05-13	Win	(Netherlands) Remy Bonjasky	K-1 World Grand Prix 2006 in Amsterdam	Amsterdam, Netherlands	Decision (unanimous)	3	3:00	63–12–1–1
2005-11-19	Loss	(Netherlands) Peter Aerts	K-1 World Grand Prix 2005, Quarter-finals	Tokyo, Japan	Ext.R decision (unanimous)	4	3:00	62–12–1–1
2005-09-23	Win	(Trinidad and Tobago) Gary Goodridge	K-1 World Grand Prix 2005 in Osaka – final elimination	Osaka, Japan	TKO (three knockdowns)	1	2:13	62–11–1–1
Qualifies for K-1 Grand Prix '05 final.
2005-07-02	Win	(Belarus) Dimitry Podgaisky	Le Grand Tournoi 2005	Paris, France	KO (right hook)	1	1:49	61–11–1–1
2005-05-27	Win	(France) Cyril Abidi	K-1 World Grand Prix 2005 in Paris	Paris, France	TKO (referee stoppage)	5	2:53	60–11–1–1
2005-04-30	Win	(Germany) Oliver van Damme	Post Tenebra Cup 2005	Geneva, Switzerland	KO (left hook)	1	2:07	59–11–1–1
Retains W.K.N. Muaythai World Super Heavyweight title.
2004-12-04	Win	(Japan) Hiromi Amada	K-1 World Grand Prix 2004	Tokyo, Japan	KO (low kicks)	2	1:03	58–11–1–1
2004-09-25	Loss	(South Africa) Francois Botha	K-1 World Grand Prix 2004 final elimination	Tokyo, Japan	(forfeit injury)	3	3:00	57–11–1–1
Fails to qualify for K-1 Grand Prix '04 final.
2004-07-17	Win	(United States) Terrence Reasby	K-1 World Grand Prix 2004 in Seoul	Seoul, Korea	KO (knee strike)	1	0:53	57–10–1–1
2003-09-21	Win	(South Africa) Shaka Zulu	K-1 Survival 2003 Japan Grand Prix Final	Yokohama, Japan	KO (right low kick)	2	1:10	56–10–1–1
2003-06-14	Win	(Belarus) Vitali Akhramenko	K-1 World Grand Prix 2003 in Paris	Paris, France	KO (right punch)	2	0:28	55–10–1–1
2002-12-07	Loss	(Netherlands) Ernesto Hoost	K-1 World Grand Prix 2002 Final, Final	Tokyo, Japan	KO (right mid-kicks)	3	1:26	54–10–1–1
Fight was for K-1 World Grand Prix 2002 title.
2002-12-07	Win	(New Zealand) Mark Hunt	K-1 World Grand Prix 2002 Final, Semi-finals	Tokyo, Japan	Decision	3	3:00	54–9–1–1
2002-12-07	Win	(Japan) Musashi	K-1 World Grand Prix 2002 Final, Quarter-finals	Tokyo, Japan	KO (punches)	2	0:51	53–9–1–1
2002-10-05	Win	(Trinidad and Tobago) Gary Goodridge	K-1 World Grand Prix 2002 final elimination	Tokyo, Japan	KO (right jab)	1	0:42	52–9–1–1
Qualifies for K-1 Grand Prix '02 final.
2002-08-28	Win	(United States) Don Frye	PRIDE Shockwave	Tokyo, Japan	KO (right hook)	1	1:30	51–9–1–1
2002-07-06	Win	(Croatia) Sinisa Andrijasevic	ISKA Championship Kickboxing	Paris, France	TKO (corner stoppage)	4	2:00	50–9–1–1
2002-05-25	Win	(New Zealand) Mark Hunt	K-1 World Grand Prix 2002 in Paris	Paris, France	TKO (corner stoppage)	2	3:00	49–9–1–1
2002-03-03	Win	(Japan) Hiromi Amada	K-1 World Grand Prix 2002 in Nagoya	Nagoya, Japan	KO (right punch)	1	1:42	48–9–1–1
2001-12-08	Loss	(New Zealand) Mark Hunt	K-1 World Grand Prix 2001 Final, Quarter-finals	Tokyo, Japan	KO (right hook)	2	2:32	47–9–1–1
2001-08-19	Win	(Belgium) Marc de Wit	K-1 Andy Memorial 2001 Japan GP Final	Saitama, Japan	KO (right cross)	2	1:45	47–8–1–1
2001-06-24	Win	(Germany) Stefan Leko	K-1 Survival 2001	Sendai, Japan	Decision	5	3:00	46–8–1–1
2001-04-29	Win	(Australia) Adam Watt	K-1 World Grand Prix 2001 in Osaka, Final	Osaka, Japan	KO (punch rush)	1	0:46	45–8–1–1
Wins K-1 World Grand Prix 2001 in Osaka tournament and Qualifies for K-1 Grand Prix '01 final.
2001-04-29	Win	(Brazil) Ebenezer Braga	K-1 World Grand Prix 2001 in Osaka, Semi-finals	Osaka, Japan	KO (left punch)	1	1:03	44–8–1–1
2001-04-29	Win	(Czech Republic) Pavel Majer	K-1 World Grand Prix 2001 in Osaka, Quarter-finals	Osaka, Japan	KO (left punch)	1	2:15	43–8–1–1
2001-03-17	NC	(South Africa) Mike Bernardo	K-1 Gladiators 2001	Yokohama, Japan	No contest	1	3:00	42–8–1–1
2001-03-02	Win	(Belarus) Andrei Zuravkov	Double Shock Power	Marseilles, France	TKO (referee stoppage)	2		42–8–1
2000-07-30	Win	(Netherlands) Ernesto Hoost	K-1 World Grand Prix 2000 in Nagoya, Final	Nagoya, Japan	TKO (corner stoppage)	1	3:00	41–8–1
Wins K-1 World GP 2000 in Nagoya tournament and Qualifies for K-1 Grand Prix '00 final.
2000-07-30	Win	(Denmark) Nicholas Pettas	K-1 World Grand Prix 2000 in Nagoya, Semi-finals	Nagoya, Japan	TKO (left hook, 2 knockdown rule)	1	3:00	40–8–1
2000-07-30	Win	(New Zealand) Mark Hunt	K-1 World Grand Prix 2000 in Nagoya, Quarter-finals	Nagoya, Japan	Decision (unanimous)	3	3:00	39–8–1
2000-07-13	Win	(England) Shaun Johnson	ISKA Championship	Las Vegas, NV	KO (left straight cross)	1	1:30	38–8–1
Retains I.S.K.A. Muaythai World Super Heavyweight title.
2000-05-28	Win	(South Africa) Jan Nortje	K-1 Survival 2000	Sapporo, Japan	KO (left hook)	1	1:07	37–8–1
2000-04-23	Win	(Brazil) Francisco Filho	K-1 The Millennium	Osaka, Japan	KO (left straight cross)	1	2:02	36–8–1
2000-03-18	Win	(Greece) Paris Vassilikos	I.S.K.A. Championship	Las Vegas, NV	KO (right hook)	2	1:09	35–8–1
Retains I.S.K.A. Muaythai World Super Heavyweight title.
1999-12-05	Loss	(Netherlands) Ernesto Hoost	K-1 World Grand Prix 1999, Semi-finals	Tokyo, Japan	KO (right hook)	2	0:26	34–8–1
1999-12-05	Win	(Netherlands) Peter Aerts	K-1 World Grand Prix 1999, Quarter-finals	Tokyo, Japan	KO (left hook)	1	1:11	34–7–1
1999-10-03	Win	(England) Matt Skelton	K-1 World Grand Prix '99 opening round	Osaka, Japan	KO (right hook)	1	1:59	33–7–1
Qualifies for K-1 World Grand Prix 1999 final.
1999-02-27	Win	(Netherlands) Rob van Esdonk	Les Stars Du Ring	Marseilles, France	KO (left hook)	1	2:28	32–7–1
1998-09-19	Win	(Brazil) Espedito da Silva	WKN World Championship Kickboxing	Atlanta, GA	KO (left high kick)	1	0:52	31–7–1
Wins vacant W.K.N. Muay Thai World Super Heavyweight title.
1998-07-18	Win	(Australia) Sam Greco	K-1 Dream '98	Nagoya, Japan	KO (right hook)	2	2:07	30–7–1
1998-05-24	Win	(Bosnia and Herzegovina) Zijad Poljo	K-1 Braves '98	Fukuoka, Japan	TKO (ref. stop/left cross)	3	2:52	29–7–1
1997-11-09	Loss	(Netherlands) Ernesto Hoost	K-1 Grand Prix '97, Quarter-finals	Tokyo, Japan	KO (right hook)	1	1:15	28–7–1
1997-09-07	Win	(United States) Rick Roufus	K-1 Grand Prix '97 First Round	Osaka, Japan	TKO (ref. stop/left high kick)	3	2:05	28–6–1
Qualifies for K-1 Grand Prix '97 final.
1997-07-20	Loss	(Netherlands) Peter Aerts	K-1 Dream '97	Nagoya, Japan	KO (right high kick)	2	1:19	27–6–1
1997-04-29	Loss	(New Zealand) Ray Sefo	K-1 Braves '97	Fukuoka, Japan	KO (right hook)	1	1:31	27–5–1
1997-04-20	Ex	(France) Stéphane Reveillon	12th Martial arts Festival	Paris-Bercy, France	No decision	3		
1997-02-01	Win	(United States) Maurice Smith	Le Choc des Champions	Paris, France	Decision	5	3:00	27–4–1
Retains I.S.K.A. Muaythai World Super Heavyweight title.
1996-12-08	Draw	(Australia) Sam Greco	K-1 Hercules '96	Nagoya, Japan	Decision	5	3:00	26–4–1
1996-10-18	Win	(Netherlands) Ernesto Hoost	K-1 Star Wars '96	Yokohama, Japan	TKO (right hook)	2	2:57	26–4
1996-09-01	Win	(Japan) Takeru	K-1 Revenge '96	Osaka, Japan	KO (right cross)	4	2:49	25–4
1996-06-01	Win	(United States) Curtis Schuster	Le Choc des Champions	Paris, France	Decision	5	3:00	24–4
Wins I.S.K.A. Muaythai World Super Heavyweight title.
1996-03-10	Loss	(Croatia) Mirko Filipović	K-1 Grand Prix '96 Opening Battle	Yokohama, Japan	Decision (unanimous)	5	3:00	23–4
Fails to qualify for K-1 World Grand Prix 1996.
1996-01-19	Win	(Netherlands) Willy Martina	Muaythai Gala in Paris	Levallois-Perret, France	KO (left low kick)	1	2:33	23–3
1995-12-09	Loss	(Switzerland) Andy Hug	K-1 Hercules	Nagoya, Japan	Decision (unanimous)	5	3:00	22–3
1995-09-03	Win	(Netherlands) John Kleijn	K-1 Revenge II	Yokohama, Japan	KO (right hook)	2	1:10	22–2
1995-05-04	Loss	(Netherlands) Peter Aerts	K-1 Grand Prix '95 Final	Tokyo, Japan	KO (right body shot)	1	1:37	21–2
Fight was for K-1 World Grand Prix 1995 title.
1995-05-04	Win	(South Africa) Mike Bernardo	K-1 Grand Prix '95 semi-finals	Tokyo, Japan	KO (right low kick)	2	3:05	21–1
1995-05-04	Win	(Japan) Masaaki Satake	K-1 Grand Prix '95 quarter-finals	Tokyo, Japan	KO (left straight punch)	3	2:32	20–1
1995-03-03	Win	(Thailand) Nokweed Davy	K-1 Grand Prix '95 Opening Battle	Tokyo, Japan	Decision (unanimous)	5	3:00	19–1
Qualifies for K-1 World Grand Prix 1995.
1994-12-10	Win	(Netherlands) Willy Martina	Full Contact Gala		Decision			
1994-00-00	Win	(South Africa) Andre Buan Buaren	R.C.F.A. World Super Heavyweight Championship	Johannesburg, South Africa	KO			
Wins R.C.F.A. World Super Heavyweight title.
1994-10-00	Win	(South Africa) Mike Bernardo	I.S.K.A. Full-Contact Intercontinental Championship	Cape Town, South Africa	Decision (3–0)	10	2:00	
Wins I.S.K.A. Full-Contact Intercontinental Super Heavyweight title.
1994-04-16	Win	(England) Andy Mayo	I.S.K.A. Full-Contact European Championship	Elbeuf, France	KO (left high kick)	1		11–1
Wins I.S.K.A. Full-Contact European Super Heavyweight title.
1993-06-07	Win	(Belgium) Claude Herman	Full-Contact gala in La Locomotive Discothèque	Paris, France	KO	1		
1993-04-24	Win	(England) Cunningham	Full Contact Gala : France vs The World	Elbeuf, France	TKO (referee stoppage)	2		
1992-12-06	Win	(France) Raynald Fucho	I.S.K.A. Full-Contact French Championship	Le Havre, France	Decision	7	2:00	
Wins I.S.K.A. Full-Contact French Super Heavyweight title.
1992-11-13	Win	(France) Stéphane Reveillon	La Nuit des Champions	Marseilles, France	KO (right hook)	2		
1992-05-30	Loss	(Algeria) Saïd Bechari	Full Contact Gala	Valence, Drôme, France	(T)KO	1		
1992-01-19	Win	(France) Joly	FFUBADA French Cup, Final	Paris, France				
Wins FFUBADA French Cup Full Contact title (−91 kg).

== Professional boxing record ==
6 fights	6 wins	0 losses
By knockout	5	0
By disqualification	1	0

No.	Result	Record	Opponent	Type	Round, time	Date	Location	Notes
6	Win	6-0	Ladislav Kovarik	TKO	2 (4); 2:10	13 November 2009	Casino de Deauville, Deauville, France	
5	Win	5-0	Werner Kreiskott	TKO	4 (4); 1:59	23 May 2009	Casino de Deauville, Deauville, France	
4	Win	4-0	Ferenc Deak	DQ	2 (4)	14 November 1998	L'Espace François Mitterrand, Mont-de-Marsan, France	
3	Win	3-0	James Henderson	KO	1 (4); 0:37	20 June 1998	The Moon, Tallahassee United States	
2	Win	2-0	Jerry Reynolds	TKO	1 (4)	11 April 1998	Township Auditorium, Columbia, United States	
1	Win	1-0	Tudor Panait	TKO	4	24 February 1998	Porto, Portugal	

== Mixed martial arts record ==
Professional record breakdown
9 matches	6 wins	3 losses
By knockout	5	0
By submission	1	2
By decision	0	1

Res.	Record	Opponent	Method	Event	Date	Round	Time	Location	Notes
Win	6–3	Adnan Alić	TKO (submission to punches)	MMA GP: Évolution	October 8, 2022	1	1:38	Paris, France	
Win	5–3	Ivan Vičić	Submission (rear-naked choke)	MMA Grand Prix: The Last of Kings	June 4, 2022	1	2:06	Le Havre, France	
Win	4–3	Chang Hee Kim	TKO (punches and knees)	HEAT 46	January 19, 2020	1	0:50	Tokyo, Japan	
Loss	3–3	Roque Martinez	Submission (scarf hold)	Rizin World Grand Prix 2017: Opening Round – Part 2	October 15, 2017	1	5:10	Fukuoka, Japan	
Loss	3–2	Satoshi Ishii	Decision (unanimous)	Dynamite!! 2010	December 31, 2010	3	5:00	Saitama, Saitama, Japan	
Win	3–1	Jimmy Ambriz	KO (punch)	K-1 Hero's 4	March 15, 2006	1	2:04	Tokyo, Japan	
Win	2–1	Alan Karaev	KO (body kick)	K-1 PREMIUM 2005 Dynamite!!	December 31, 2005	2	1:14	Osaka, Japan	
Win	1–1	Yoshihiro Akiyama	KO (knees)	K-1 Hero's 1	March 26, 2005	1	2:24	Saitama, Saitama, Japan	
Loss	0–1	Tadao Yasuda	Submission (forearm choke)	Inoki Bom-Ba-Ye 2001	December 31, 2001	2	2:50	Saitama, Saitama, Japan	

=== Mixed rules record ===
Professional record breakdown
1 match	0 wins	0 losses
Draws	1	

Res.	Record	Opponent	Method	Event	Date	Round	Time	Location	Notes
Draw	0–0–1	Bob Sapp	Draw	K-1 PREMIUM 2004 Dynamite!!	December 31, 2004	3	3:00	Tokyo, Japan	The fight was with both Mixed Martial Arts and K-1 rules.

== Filmography ==
Jérôme Le Banner's film appeareances
Year	Title	Role	Notes	Ref.
2007	Scorpion	Elias	French major film	
2008	Asterix at the Olympic Games	Claudius Cornedurus	French major film	
2008	Disco	Rodolphe	French major film	
2008	Babylon A.D.	Killa	French major film	
2008	Boxing My Shadow		Documentary DVD	
2010	Fatal	Hervé Willard	French major film	
2010	Bruc. La llegenda	Baraton	Spanish major film	
2011	Oubl	Bob	French short film	
2012	Les Infidèles		French major film	
2012	Les Mouvements du bassin	Charles	French major film	
2012	Scènes de ménages		French short series	
2013	L'Itinéraire d'un Caïd		French short film	
2016	Exterminatus	Orias	French short film	
2016	Chefs	Le Gros	French series	
2019	Nicky Larson et le Parfum de Cupidon	Bob	French movie	
2025	The Gardener	Commander Masson / Phoebus	French movie	
2026	Cat's Eyes	Gabriel	French series	

== See also ==
- List of K-1 events
- List of K-1 champions
- List of male kickboxers
