= Yuki Goto (singer, born 1986) =

Japanese YouTuber and former singer (born 1986)

- 後藤 祐樹
- Born: July 10, 1986 (age 40); Edogawa, Tokyo, Japan
- Other name: Yuki (ユウキ) (2000–2002)
- Occupation: YouTuber
- Years active: 2000–2002; 2013–present
- Agents: Harmony Promotion (2000–2002); Excelling (2022–present)
- Children: 3, including Moa Serizawa (daughter)
- Relatives: Maki Goto (sister)
- Musical career
- Genres: J-pop
- Instrument: Vocals
- Label: Toy's Factory (2000-2002)
- Formerly of: EE Jump

YouTube information
- Channel: Otto Totto Channel
- Genre: Vlog
- Subscribers: 127 thousand
- Views: 61.1 million
- Last updated: 4 September 2024
Yuki Goto
Member of the Yachimata City Council
- Incumbent
- Assumed office 2023

Yuki Goto (後藤 祐樹, Gotō Yūki; born July 10, 1986) is a Japanese YouTuber, politician, and former singer. In 2000, while he was in middle school, he joined the group EE Jump as their lead rapper under the stage name Yuki (ユウキ; stylized as YUKI). He is the younger brother of singer and former Morning Musume member Maki Goto.

Throughout the 2000s, Goto was involved in several scandals, two of which led to EE Jump's disbandment and his retirement from music. In 2007, he was arrested for theft and was sentenced to five and half years in prison. After being released in 2013, Goto made minor media appearances before joining YouTube in 2021 and signing a contract with Excelling to handle his entertainment activities.

In addition to Goto's YouTube activities, he was elected as a member of the Yachimata City Council in 2023.

== Career ==
=== 2000-2002: EE Jump ===
In 1999, when he was in 6th grade, Goto was scouted by Harmony Promotion at a fan event for his older sister, Maki, who was a member of the girl group Morning Musume at the time. He was assigned to a group with Sonim and Ken under the name EE Jump as their lead rapper. Together, they made their first televised appearance on the variety show Warau Inu no Bōken. Though Ken left the group before their CD debut, EE Jump released their first single on October 18, 2000, with the song "Love is Energy!" and achieved mainstream success with their third single, "Otto Totto Natsu da ze!" (おっととっと夏だぜ!), on May 16, 2001.

Despite EE Jump's success, Goto disliked performing in the group and was constantly told by staff that he lacked skill in singing and keeping in rhythm. In 2021, he also expressed that he "did not understand" the "taste in music" of EE Jump's music producer, Tsunku, and that he often felt embarrassed appearing on television to perform the group's songs. During promotions for EE Jump's fourth single, "Iki na Rhythm!" (イキナリズム!), Goto had an argument with the group's female manager over their tight schedules, which led him to physically assault her and check out of his hotel room without permission, fleeing to Tochigi Prefecture. In a 2021 interview with Shukan Bunshun, Goto also alleged that he dated Sayaka Ichii after she had left Morning Musume, and he was physically assaulted by Kaoru Wada, the chief of Harmony Promotion, after he had spotted them leaving a taxi together; as a result, the rest of the members from Morning Musume allegedly were not allowed to have contact with him. Wada suspended his activities for three months while Sonim continued promoting without him. After issuing an apology, Goto rejoined EE Jump in February 2002; however, shortly after graduating middle school, tabloid magazine Friday published photographs of him with alcohol while underage at a cabaret club in a VIP room with Shun Hasebe, a member of Johnny's Jr. In 2021, Goto stated that, as a result of the scandal, his agency asked for him to stay home and phone them about his whereabouts whenever he left his residence. Goto disagreed with those circumstances, and as a result, he retired from the entertainment industry, leading to EE Jump disbanding on April 13, 2002.

=== 2013-present: Sange and YouTube career ===
Following his 5-year incarceration after his 2007 arrest, in 2013, Goto released a memoir titled Sange: Gomaki no Otōto to Yobarete (lit. Repentance: They Call Me Gomaki's Little Brother), which discussed his parents' deaths, his relationship with his sister Maki, and his struggles with fame.

In 2016, Goto appeared as a hair model, representing the salon Gossip Hair. In 2017, Goto appeared as a guest on the web talk show Imada-Higashi no Curricular, making his first televised appearance in 15 years. In 2018, he appeared again on the show's second season.

On July 7, 2021, Goto started a YouTube channel titled Otto Totto Channel. On January 26, 2022, he announced through his Instagram account that he had signed with the talent agency Excelling. Throughout 2022, Goto participated in Breaking Down, an amateur kickboxing exhibition event for YouTubers, in March and November. He won both matches, and after his second appearance, he announced he was retiring from Breaking Down.

In August 2023, Goto was elected as a member of the Yachimata City Council in Chiba Prefecture.

== Personal life ==
Goto dropped out of high school in the middle of his first year. Goto has several tattoos, receiving his first one, a carp on his neck, when he was 20 years old. In addition to his YouTube career, Goto works for a factory in Yachimata, Chiba Prefecture. In 2018, he relocated to Yachimata from Edogawa, Tokyo, to be closer to his job.

=== Family ===
Goto has three older sisters, with his third oldest sister being singer Maki Goto, a former member of Morning Musume. In 1996, while Goto was on a hiking trip in the mountains with his father and a family friend, his father died from a fall. Goto himself had noticed it first, as he had stated, "Hey, didn't you hear a loud thump just now?"

On January 23, 2010, Goto's mother, Tokiko Goto, fell from the third story of their house in Edogawa, Tokyo at 11 pm. She was rushed to the hospital, but died from her injuries on January 24 at 1:13 am. Goto was incarcerated at the time from his 2007 arrest and was not allowed to attend her funeral.

In 2005, Goto married a non-celebrity woman at the age of 18, with whom he had three daughters. His eldest daughter is Ukka member Moa Serizawa. He and his first wife divorced seven months after he was released from prison in 2013 due to growing apart while he was serving his sentence. In 2015, Goto married another non-celebrity woman, Chizuru, who he had met in 2013 through his brother-in-law, Maki's husband. Chizuru later won the Ameba Award in April 2022 after opening her blog in the same month. Goto and Chizuru do not have any children together, but they have expressed interest, as Chizuru is undergoing treatments for her infertility.

=== Arrest ===
On October 20, 2007, Goto was arrested and plead guilty for breaking into a construction site in Edogawa, Tokyo on July 15, 2007, and stealing 80 reels of electric cable worth approximately ¥1 million. His accomplices included two of his friends, who were 18 and 19 years old respectively. He was identified by the police by his tattoos. He was sentenced to five and a half years in jail by the Tokyo District Court in May 2008. He was released in 2013.

=== Public image ===
Since returning to entertainment, Goto shared in 2021 that he had been offered acting roles to portray delinquent and yakuza characters, but he has declined those roles to protect the image of himself and his family.

== Kickboxing record ==
Kickboxing record
2 wins, 0 losses, 0 draws
Date	Result	Opponent	Event	Location	Method	Round	Time	Record
2022-03-21	Win	(Japan) Ryōchin	Breaking Down 4	Japan	Decision (unanimous)	1	1:00	3-0
2022-11-03	Win	(Japan) Taku	Breaking Down 6	Japan	Decision (unanimous)	1	2:00	4-1

== Publications ==
- Sange: Gomaki no Otōto to Yobarete (懺悔 ゴマキの弟と呼ばれて; lit. Repentance: They Call Me Gomaki's Little Brother) (2013)
