= Wang Qiang (martial artist) =

Chinese sanshou practitioner (born 1989)

- Born: Wang Qiang; January 16, 1989 (age 37)
- Nationality: (China) Chinese
- Height: 6 ft 1.0 in (1.85 m)
- Weight: 229 lb (104 kg; 16.4 st)
- Division: Heavyweight
- Style: Sanda
- Years active: 4 (2006–2010)

Kickboxing record
- Total: 3
- Wins: 1
- By knockout: 1
- Losses: 2
- By knockout: 1
- Draws: 0
- No contests: 0

Wang Qiang (simplified Chinese: 王强; traditional Chinese: 王強; pinyin: Wáng Qiáng; born January 16, 1989) is a Chinese Sanda practitioner who competed in K-1. He was the All China Sanda Championship 2006 (90+ KG) champion and runner-up in the K-1 World Grand Prix 2007 in Hong Kong.

== Career ==
=== K-1 ===
Drawing K-1's attention as the Chinese national Sanda champion, Wang entered the K-1 World Grand Prix 2007 in Hong Kong on August 5. After knocking out South Korean competitor Randy Kim in his quarterfinal match with low kicks and punching combinations, he faced Japanese veteran Musashi in the semifinals. Coming out aggressively and forcing Musashi against the ropes, Wang fouled his opponent by kneeing him in the groin and sent Musashi to the canvas. Simultaneously, the referee paused the fight and Musashi's corner threw in the towel. Ringside officials voided Musashi's concession in light of Qiang's low blow and he was granted an extended period of time to recover. However, having already endured multiple low blows in his previous match, the karate stylist could not continue. Controversially, Musashi was declared the winner because Qiang had left the ring prematurely, but Qiang advanced due to his opponent's incapacity.

In the final match, Wang faced Yusuke Fujimoto, the first Japanese fighter to win a K-1 tournament outside of Japan, who had also advanced to the finals due to an injured opponent. Qiang once again began the match aggressively, pushing Fujimoto backwards before throwing him to the mat. However, the more experienced Fujimoto maintained his guard and eventually breached Qiang's defenses, scoring a knockdown with a straight punch and finishing his opponent off with a powerful left hook. Qiang was defeated within the last 11 seconds of the first round.

== Titles ==
- Sanshou
  - All China Sanda Championship 2006 (90+ KG) Champion
- Kickboxing
  - K-1 World Grand Prix 2007 in Hong Kong runner-up

== Kickboxing record ==
1 wins (1 (T)KO), 2 losses
Date	Result	Record	Opponent	Event	Method	Round	Time
August 5, 2007	Loss	1-2-0	(Japan) Yusuke Fujimoto	K-1 World Grand Prix 2007 in Hong Kong Final	KO (left hook)	1	2:49
Fight was for K-1 World Grand Prix 2007 in Hong Kong title.
August 5, 2007	Loss	1-1-0	(Japan) Musashi	K-1 World Grand Prix 2007 in Hong Kong Semifinal	DQ	1	2:00
Advanced to finals despite loss, due to Musashi being injured.
August 5, 2007	Win	1-0-0	(South Korea) Randy Kim	K-1 World Grand Prix 2007 in Hong Kong Quarterfinal	KO (punches)	2	1:32
