= Wang Qiang (calligrapher) =

Chinese calligrapher (born 1959)

Wang Qiang (born 1959) is a Chinese calligrapher.

== Early life ==
Qiang was born in Beijing, China, and graduated from Beijing Normal University in 1982. He studied calligraphy and poetry from Master Qigong (Chinese calligrapher, artist, painter, connoisseur and sinologist).

== Career ==
Wang Qiang became a member of the Chinese Calligraphers Association in the 1980s, and is currently a member of the Chinese Calligraphy Education Working Committee. Qiang's calligraphy works were collected by the National Art Museum of China, World Expo and other national institutions. He won first prize at the fourth Chinese Calligraphers Association Symposium. He has published many research papers on journals, such as the Journal of Chinese Calligraphy and Calligraphy Study. Qiang's book, Introduction of Chinese Calligraphy has had a profound influence on the academy.

Wang Qiang currently serves as the Dean of the School of Culture and Communication at the Central University of Finance and Economics, and has served in other significant positions including Vice President of the Chinese Writing Association, President of the Chinese Language Research Association in National Financial Schools, a member of the Fifth Committee of Beijing Federation of Social Science circles, a member of the Haidian District, Beijing CPPCC Standing Committee, President of the Beijing Writing Association, and Syndic of the Beijing Literary criticism Association.
