= Sonim =

Zainichi Korean actress and musician

Sonim ソニン
- Born: Seong Son-im; March 10, 1983 (age 43)
- Origin: Kōchi Prefecture, Shikoku, Japan
- Genres: J-pop; K-pop
- Occupations: Actress; singer
- Instrument: Vocals
- Years active: 2000–present
- Labels: Toy's Factory; Harmony Records; Amuse
- Formerly of: EE Jump; Tomboy
- Website: artist.amuse.co.jp/artist/sonim/

Korean name
- Hangul: 성선임
- Hanja: 成膳任
- RR: Seong Seonim
- MR: Sŏng Sŏnim

Seong Son-im (born March 10, 1983), known mononymously as Sonim (ソニン, Sonin), is a Japanese-born Korean actress and singer associated with Amuse Inc. She debuted in 2000 as the lead singer of the pop duo EE Jump. In 2002, she debuted as a solo singer with "Curry Rice no Onna", which then led to the release of her debut album, Hana, in 2004.

In 2003, Sonim made her first acting appearance in the television drama High School Teacher, where she won Best Newcomer at the 36th The Television Drama Academy Award. Eventually, she left her idol music career to pursue theater.

== Career ==
=== 2000–2002: Debut with EE Jump ===
Sonim was inspired by Speed to become a singer and applied to several auditions, one of which happened to be for Morning Musume's 3rd generation in 1999. Despite not making the group, Kaoru Wada, Morning Musume's manager at the time, scouted her to be part of an upcoming group that later became EE Jump. In January 2000, Sonim moved to Tokyo for EE Jump's activities. After training in New York, EE Jump debuted in October 2000 with the song "Love is Energy!" On November 28, 2001, Sonim released her first solo song "Winter (Samui Kisetsu no Monogatari)" as EE Jump's fifth single.

=== 2002–2005: Solo music career ===
After EE Jump disbanded in April 2002, Sonim debuted as a solo singer with the release of her first single, "Curry Rice no Onna."

In September 2006, Sonim debuted in South Korea, releasing a Korean-language version of "Curry Rice no Onna" under the title "After Love" (후애 (後愛).

In 2007, she became part of the vocal group Tomboy with Akane Osawa, which debuted in November 2007. In 2007-2009, she starred as Kim in Japanese production of the musical Miss Saigon. In 2007-2011, she played the role of Johanna in the Japanese production of Sweeney Todd.

== Personal life ==
Sonim is a third-generation Korean. She is fluent in Japanese, Korean, and English.

She has said on her personal blog that for years she has been on a vegan diet. In 2009, while preparing for her role in the stage production of Shakespeare's "Henry VI", she began following a macrobiotic diet, which inspired her to become vegetarian. In 2012, she became vegan for respect for all living beings.

== Discography ==
=== Singles ===
Title	Year	Peak position	Sales	Album
Title	Year	JPN	Sales	Album
"Curry Rice no Onna" (カレーライスの女)	2002	8	JPN: 70,678 copies	Hana
"Tsugaru Kaikyō no Onna" (津軽海峡の女)	2002	9	JPN: 39,209 copies	Hana
"Tokyo Midnight Loneliness" (東京ミッドナイト ロンリネス)	2003	7	JPN: 34,222 copies	Hana
"Gōkon Ato no FamiRes Nite" (合コン後のファミレスにて)	2003	9	JPN: 22,732 copies	Non-album single
"Honto wa ne" (ほんとはね。)	2004	12	JPN: 36,954 copies	Non-album single
"Jigsaw Puzzle" (ジグソーパズル)	2004	9	JPN: 13,772 copies	Non-album single
"Asunaro Ginga" (あすなろ銀河)	2005	18	JPN: 6,943 copies	Non-album single
"Zutto Soba ni Ite ne" (ずっとそばにいてね。) / "Curry Rice no Onna" (カレーライスの女) (2020 Remix)	2020	96	—N/a	Non-album single
"—" denotes releases that did not chart or were not released in that region.

=== Albums ===
1. 2003-05-14 Hana

=== DVD ===
1. 2004-03-17 Sonim Collection

=== Theatre ===
- Sweeney Todd: The Demon Barber of Fleet Street (2007–2011) - Johanna Barker
- Miss Saigon (2008–2009) - Kim
- Henry VI (2009) - Joan la Pucelle (Joan of Arc)
- Rent - Mimi Márquez (2010), Maureen Johnson (2012–2015)
- The Threepenny Opera (2014) - Polly Peachum
- Mozart! (2014) - Constanze
- Wuthering Heights (2015) - Isabella Linton
- Dance of the Vampires (2015–2016) - Magda
- Kinky Boots (2016–2022) - Lauren
- 1789: Les Amants de la Bastille (2016–2018) - Solene Rigot
- Beautiful: The Carole King Musical (2017–2020) - Cynthia Weil
- The Rocky Horror Show (2017) - Janet Weiss
- Marie Antoinette (2018–2021) - Margrid Arnaud
- Oliver! (2021) - Nancy
- The 39 Steps (2022) - Annabella Schmidt/Pamela/Margaret
- The Factory Girls (2023) - Harriet Farley
- Measure for Measure (2023) - Isabella
- All's Well That Ends Well (2023) - Diana
- L'art Reste (2024) - Kim Hyang-An
- Six (2025) - Catherine of Aragon
- Waitress (2025) - Dawn Pinkett

== Filmography ==
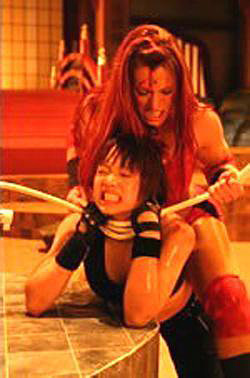
Behind the scenes image from the film Oh! My Zombie Mermaid

=== Film ===
- Oh! My Zombie Mermaid (2004), Nami Ishizuka
- Snakes and Earrings (2008), Yuri

=== Television ===
- Koukou Kyoushi 2003 (2003), Beniko Kudo
- Anpan (2025), Mimi Yamashita
- Shadows of the Ten Ninja (2026), Inbeyama Gozen

=== Japanese dubbing ===
Animation

- Moana 2 (2024) – Matangi

== Awards ==
Year	Award	Category	Nominated work	Result	Ref.
2002	40th Golden Arrow Award	Best New Artist	Herself	Won	
2003	36th The Television Drama Academy Award	Best Newcomer	High School Teacher	Won	
