= K-1 Andy Memorial 2001 Japan GP Final =

K-1 martial event in 2001

- Promotion: K-1
- Date: August 19, 2001
- Venue: Saitama Super Arena
- City: Saitama, Japan
- Attendance: 18,200

Event chronology
K-1 World Grand Prix 2001 in Las Vegas	K-1 Andy Memorial 2001 Japan GP Final	K-1 World Grand Prix 2001 in Fukuoka

K-1 Andy Memorial 2001 Japan GP Final was a martial arts event promoted by the K-1 organization, named in honour of K-1 legend Andy Hug who had died the previous year. It was an elimination tournament involving eight fighters based in Japan, with all bouts being fought under K-1 Rules (100 kg/156-220 lbs) and the winner qualifying for the K-1 World Grand Prix 2001. Six of these fighters had qualified via the earlier K-1 Survival 2001 event while holder Musashi had qualified as last years winner and long time Tokyo resident Nicholas Pettas was a foreign invitee. As well as tournament bouts there were a number of local and international bouts, including special 'Andy Memorial Matches', with matches fought under either K-1 or MMA Rules. In total there were twenty two fighters at the event, representing nine countries.

The tournament champion was Nicholas Pettas who defeated Musashi in the final by extra round unanimous decision. As a result of the tournament Nicholas Pettas would qualify for the K-1 World Grand Prix 2001. The event was held at the Saitama Super Arena, in Saitama, Japan on Sunday, August 19, 2001.

== K-1 Andy Memorial 2001 Japan GP Final Tournament ==
Quarter Finals
(Japan) Musashi	DEC
(Japan) Toru Oishi
(Japan) Great Kusatsu
(Japan) Tsuyoshi Nakasako	DEC
(Japan) Yusuke Fujimoto
(Denmark) Nicholas Pettas	TKO
(Japan) Nobu Hayashi	KO
(Japan) Tatsufumi Tomihira

Semi Finals
(Japan) Musashi	DEC
(Japan) Tsuyoshi Nakasako
(Denmark) Nicholas Pettas	TKO
(Japan) Nobu Hayashi

Final
(Japan) Musashi
(Denmark) Nicholas Pettas	DEC

== Results ==
Opening Match: K-1 Rules / 3Min. 3R Ext.2R

Masahide Aoyagi (Japan) vs Hiraku Hori (Japan)
Hori defeated Aoyagi by 3rd Round Unanimous Decision 3-0

Andy Memorial Match 1: K-1 Rules / 3Min. 3R Ext.2R

Nobuaki Kakuda (Japan) vs Mauricio Da Silva (Brazil)
Kakuda defeated Da Silva by 3rd Round Unanimous Decision 3-0

Quarter Finals: K-1 Rules / 3Min. 3R Ext.1R

Musashi (Japan) vs Toru Oishi (Japan)
Musashi defeated Oishi by 3rd Round Unanimous Decision 3-0

Great Kusatsu (Japan) vs Tsuyoshi Nakasako (Japan)
Nakasako defeated Kusatsu by 3rd Round Unanimous Decision 3-0

Yusuke Fujimoto (Japan) vs Nicholas Pettas (Greece)
Pettas defeated Fujimoto by TKO (Right Low Kick) at 2:57 of the 1st Round

Nobu Hayashi (Japan) vs Tatsufumi Tomihira (Japan)
Hayashi defeated Tomihira by KO (Right Hook) at 2:55 of the 3rd Round

Andy Memorial Match 2: K-1 Rules / 3Min. 3R Ext.2R

Hiroki Kurosawa (Japan) vs Taira Noyuki (Japan)
Noyuki defeated Kurosawa by TKO (Doctor Stoppage) at 3:00 of the 3rd Round

Semi Finals: K-1 Rules / 3Min. 3R Ext.1R

Musashi (Japan) vs Tsuyoshi Nakasako (Japan)
Musashi defeated Nakasako by 3rd Round Unanimous Decision 3-0

Nicholas Pettas (Denmark) vs Nobu Hayashi (Japan)
Pettas defeated Hayashi by TKO (Right Low Kick) at 1:26 of the 1st Round

Super Fight: K-1 Rules / 3Min. 3R Ext.2R

Jérôme Le Banner (France) vs Marc de Wit (Belgium)
Le Banner defeated de Wit by KO (Right Punch) at 1:45 of the 2nd Round

Final: K-1 Rules / 3Min. 3R Ext.2R

Musashi (Japan) vs Nicholas Pettas (Denmark)
Pettas defeated Musashi by Extra Round Unanimous Decision 3-0

K-1 vs Oiki Super Fights: K-1 MMA Rules / 3Min. 5R

Rene Rooze (Netherlands) vs Tadao Yasuda (Japan)
Rooze defeated Yasuda by KO (Left High Kick) at 0:09 of the 3rd Round

Gary Goodridge (Trinidad and Tobago) vs Jan Nortje (South Africa)
Goodridge defeated Nortje by Submission (Arm Crush) at 1:11 of the 1st Round

Mirko Cro Cop (Croatia) vs Kazuyuki Fujita (Japan)
Cro Cop defeated Fujita by TKO (Doctor Stoppage) at 0:39 of the 1st Round

== See also ==
- List of K-1 events
- List of male kickboxers
