= K-1 World Grand Prix 2008 in Seoul Final 16 =

K-1 martial arts event in 2008

- The poster for K-1 World Grand Prix 2008 in Seoul Final 16
- Promotion: K-1
- Date: September 27, 2008
- Venue: Olympic Gymnastics Arena
- City: (South Korea) Seoul, Korea
- Attendance: 15,729

Event chronology
K-1 Koshien 2008 King of Under 18 Final 16	K-1 World Grand Prix 2008 in Seoul Final 16	K-1 World MAX 2008 World Championship Tournament Final

K-1 World Grand Prix 2008 in Seoul Final 16 was a martial arts event held by the K-1 on Saturday September 27, 2008 at the Olympic Gymnastics Arena in Seoul, Korea. It was the Final Elimination tournament for top sixteen fighters. The winners qualified for the K-1 World GP 2008 Final held on December 6, 2008, at Yokohama Arena, Japan.

The eight finalists from K-1 World GP 2007 Final were automatically qualified, then four World GP 2008 tournament winners in Amsterdam, Fukuoka, Taipei and Hawaii. The last four spots were selected by fan voting.

The K-1 World GP 2008 Final 16 attracted a crowd of 15,769 to the Seoul Olympic Complex and was broadcast live across South Korea by CJ Media and in Japan on the Fuji TV Network.

== Qualifying events ==
=== K-1 World GP 2008 in Fukuoka ===
The winner was Ewerton Teixeira. For more information, see K-1 World Grand Prix 2008 in Fukuoka.

=== K-1 World GP 2008 in Amsterdam ===
Round of 16
(Belarus) Zabit Samedov	DEC
(Brazil) Vitor Miranda
(Belarus) Sergei Gur
(France) Freddy Kemayo	KO
(Turkey) Erhan Deniz
(Romania) Cătălin Moroșanu	DEC
(Netherlands) Errol Zimmerman	KO
(Croatia) Damir Tovarovič
(Hungary) Attila Karacs	KO
(Czech Republic) Petr Vondraček
(Tonga) Paula Mataele
(Switzerland) Björn Bregy	KO

Quarter Finals
(New Zealand) Doug Viney
(Belarus) Zabit Samedov	DEC
(France) Freddy Kemayo	KO
(Romania) Cătălin Moroșanu
(Netherlands) Errol Zimmerman	TKO
(Hungary) Attila Karacs
(Switzerland) Bjorn Bregy	KO
(South Africa) Jan Nortje

Semi Finals
(Belarus) Zabit Samedov	DEC
(Netherlands) Brian Douwes *
(Netherlands) Errol Zimmerman	KO
(Switzerland) Bjorn Bregy

Final
(Belarus) Zabit Samedov
(Netherlands) Errol Zimmerman	DEC

* Reserve Fight winner Brian Douwes replaced Freddy Kemayo in the Semi Finals as Freddy Kemayo was unable to continue due to injury

=== K-1 World GP 2008 in Taipei ===
Quarter Finals
(Russia) Ruslan Karaev	KO
(Japan) Tatsufumi Tomihira
(South Korea) Young-hyun Kim	DEC
(Thailand) Saiseelek Nor-Seepun
(Russia) Aleksandr Pitchkounov	DEC
(Japan) Nobu Hayashi
(South Korea) Yong-soo Park
(Japan) Makoto Uehara	KO

Semi Finals
(Russia) Ruslan Karaev	TKO
(South Korea) Young-hyun Kim
(Russia) Aleksandr Pitchkounov	KO
(Canada) Vaughn Anderson *

Final
(Russia) Ruslan Karaev	KO
(Russia) Aleksandr Pitchkounov

* Reserve Fight winner Vaughn Anderson replaced Makoto Uehara in the Semi Finals as Makoto Uehara was unable to continue due to injury

=== K-1 World GP 2008 in Hawaii ===
Quarter Finals
(United States) Mighty Mo	DEC
(United States) Justice Smith
(United States) Butterbean
(United States) Wesley Correira	KO
(Turkey) Gokhan Saki	KO
(United States) Deutsch Pu'u
(Denmark) Nicholas Pettas
(United States) Rick Cheek	TKO

Semi Finals
(South Korea) Randy Kim *	KO
(United States) Wesley Correira
(Turkey) Gokhan Saki	KO
(United States) Rick Cheek

Final
(South Korea) Randy Kim
(Turkey) Gokhan Saki	KO

* Reserve Fight winner Randy Kim replaced Mighty Mo in the Semi Finals as Mighty Mo could not continue due to injury

=== Fan Voting Results ===
Paul Slowinski earned a wild-card spot on the card through a fan poll on the K-1 website. Ray Sefo of New Zealand and Chalid "Die Faust" Arrab from Germany were also voted into the tournament.

== Results ==
- Opening Fights: K-1 Rules / 3Min. 3R Ext. 1R

Keijiro Maeda (Japan) vs Min Ho Song (South Korea)
Maeda defeated Song by KO (Right Low Kick) at 1:43 of the 3rd Round.

Zabit Samedov (Belarus) vs Fabiano da Silva (Brazil)
Samedov defeated da Silva by 3rd Round Unanimous Decision 3-0 (30-28, 30-28, 30-29).

Yong-soo Park (South Korea) vs Randy Kim (South Korea)
Kim defeated Park by KO (Right Low Kick) at 1:11 of the 2nd Round.

- Final 16 : K-1 Rules / 3Min. 3R Ext. 2R

Ruslan Karaev (Russia) vs Chalid Arrab (Germany)
Karaev defeated Arrab by KO (3 Knockdown, Punche Rush) at 2:30 of the 2nd Round.

Jerome Le Banner (France) vs Junichi Sawayashiki (Japan)
Le Banner defeated Sawayashiki by 3rd Round Unanimous Decision 3-0 (30-26, 30-27, 30-28).

Ray Sefo (New Zealand) vs Gokhan Saki (Turkey)
Saki defeated Sefo by Extra Round Unanimous Decision 3-0 (10-9, 10-9, 10-9). After 3 rounds the judges had scored it Decision Draw 0-0 (29-29, 30-30, 30-30).

Glaube Feitosa (Brazil) vs Errol Zimmerman (Netherlands)
Zimmerman defeated Feitosa by 3rd Round Unanimous Decision 3-0 (30-26, 30-26, 30-26).

Remy Bonjasky (Netherlands) vs Paul Slowinski (Poland)
Bonjasky defeated Slowinski by 3rd Round Majority Decision 2-0 (30-29, 30-30, 30-29).

Ewerton Teixeira (Brazil) vs Musashi (Japan)
Teixeira defeated Musashi by 3rd Round Unanimous Decision 3-0 (30-28, 30-28, 30-28).

Badr Hari (Morocco) vs Hong-man Choi (South Korea)
Hari defeated Hong-man by TKO (Corner stoppage) at the beginning of the Extra Round. After 3 rounds the judges had scored it a Majority Draw 1-0 (28-29, 28-28, 28-28) in favour of Hong-man.

Semmy Schilt (Netherlands) vs Peter Aerts (Netherlands)
Aerts defeated Schilt by 3rd Round Majority Decision 2-0 (30-29, 30-29, 30-30).

== See also ==
- List of K-1 events
- List of K-1 champions
- List of male kickboxers
