= K-1 World Grand Prix 2005 in Tokyo Final =

K-1 martial arts event in 2005

- Promotion: K-1
- Date: November 19, 2005
- Venue: Tokyo Dome
- City: Tokyo, Japan
- Attendance: 58,213

Event chronology
K-1 Fighting Network Korea MAX 2005	K-1 World Grand Prix 2005 in Tokyo Final	K-1 Kings of Oceania 2005 Round 3

K-1 World Grand Prix 2005 in Tokyo Final was a kickboxing event promoted by the K-1. The event was held at the Tokyo Dome in Tokyo, Japan on Saturday, November 19, 2005 in front of 58,213 spectators. It was the thirteenth K-1 World Grand Prix final, involving twelve of the world's best K-1 fighters (four being reservists), with all bouts fought under K-1 Rules (100 kg/156-220 lbs). The tournament qualifiers had almost all qualified via the K-1 World Grand Prix 2005 in Osaka - Final Elimination with the exception of Remy Bonjasky who was the reigning champion. As well as tournament matches there was also an 'Opening Fight' fought under K-1 Rules between Patrick Barry and Alexander Pitchkounov. In total there were fourteen fighters at the event, representing eleven countries.

The tournament winner was Semmy Schilt who defeated Glaube Feitosa in the final by first round knockout. The event was Semmy Schilt and Glaube Feitosa's first K-1 World Grand Prix final appearance and would be the first of Semmy Schilt's three consecutive K-1 World Grand Prix final victories - a K-1 record. Semmy Schilt would also be the first karate practitioner to win the K-1 World Grand Prix since Andy Hug in 1996.

== K-1 World Grand Prix 2005 Tournament ==
Final Elimination
(Netherlands) Remy Bonjasky
BYE
(United States) Bob Sapp
(South Korea) Choi Hong-man	DEC
(New Zealand) Ray Sefo	DEC
(Thailand) Kaoklai Kaennorsing
(Brazil) Glaube Feitosa
(Netherlands) Semmy Schilt	DEC
(France) Jérôme Le Banner	KO
(Trinidad and Tobago) Gary Goodridge
(Netherlands) Peter Aerts	KO
(United States) Mighty Mo
(Japan) Musashi	DEC
(South Africa) Francois Botha
(Russia) Ruslan Karaev	DEC
(Sweden) Rickard Nordstrand

Quarter Finals
(Netherlands) Remy Bonjasky	DEC
(South Korea) Choi Hong-man
(New Zealand) Ray Sefo
(Netherlands) Semmy Schilt	DEC
(France) Jérôme Le Banner
(Netherlands) Peter Aerts	DEC
(Japan) Musashi	DEC
(Russia) Ruslan Karaev

Semi Finals
(Netherlands) Remy Bonjasky
(Netherlands) Semmy Schilt	KO
(Brazil) Glaube Feitosa *	KO
(Japan) Musashi

Final
(Netherlands) Semmy Schilt	KO
(Brazil) Glaube Feitosa

* Glaube Feitosa replaced Peter Aerts in the Semi Finals as Peter Aerts was injured

== Results ==
Opening Fight: K-1 Rules / 3Min. 3R

Aleksandr Pitchkounov (Russia) vs Patrick Barry (United States)
Match resulted in a 3rd Round Decision Draw 1-1 (30-27, 29-29, 28-29)

Quarter Finals: K-1 Rules / 3Min. 3R Ext.1R

Remy Bonjasky (Netherlands) vs Choi Hong-man (South Korea)
Bonjasky defeated Choi by 3rd Round Unanimous Decision 3-0 (30-29, 30-29, 30-28)

Ray Sefo (New Zealand) vs Semmy Schilt (Netherlands)
Schilt defeated Sefo by 3rd Round Unanimous Decision 3-0 (30-26, 30-26, 30-26)

Jérôme Le Banner (France) vs Peter Aerts (Netherlands)
Aerts defeated Le Banner by Extra Round Unanimous Decision 3-0 (10-9, 10-9, 10-9) but could not continue due to a fractured rib - Reserve Fight winner Glaube Feitosa would take his place in the Semi Finals. After 3 rounds the judges had scored it a Decision Draw (29-29, 29-29, 29-29)

Musashi (Japan) vs Ruslan Karaev (Russia)
Musashi defeated Karaev by Extra Round Unanimous Decision 3-0 (10-9, 10-9, 10-9). After 3 rounds the judges had scored it a Decision Draw (30-29, 30-30, 29-30).

Reserve Fights: K-1 Rules / 3Min. 3R Ext.1R

Glaube Feitosa (Brazil) vs Gary Goodridge (Trinidad and Tobago)
Feitosa defeated Goodridge by 3rd Round Unanimous Decision 3-0 (30-27, 30-28, 30-28)

Stefan Leko (Germany) vs Badr Hari (Morocco)
Hari defeated Leko by KO (Spinning Back Left High Kick) at 1:30 of the 2nd Round

Semi Finals: K-1 Rules / 3Min. 3R Ext.1R

Remy Bonjasky (Netherlands) vs Semmy Schilt (Netherlands)
Schilt defeated Bonjasky by KO (Knee Strike) at 2:08 of the 1st Round

Glaube Feitosa (Brazil) vs Musashi (Japan)
Feitosa defeated Musashi by KO (Flying Knee) at 1:05 of the 2nd Round

Final: K-1 Rules / 3Min. 3R Ext.2R

Semmy Schilt (Netherlands) vs Glaube Feitosa (Brazil)
Schilt defeated Feitosa by KO (Knee Strike) at 0:48 of the 1st Round

== See also ==
- List of K-1 events
- List of K-1 champions
- List of male kickboxers
