= Antoni Hardonk =

Dutch kickboxer and mixed martial artist

- Born: Antoni Hardonk; February 5, 1976 (age 50); Weesp, Netherlands
- Height: 6 ft 4 in (193 cm)
- Weight: 249 1/2 lb (113.2 kg; 17.82 st)
- Division: Heavyweight (kickboxing); Heavyweight (MMA)
- Reach: 78 in (198 cm)
- Style: Kickboxing, BJJ
- Fighting out of: Amsterdam, Netherlands; Los Angeles, California, U.S.
- Team: Vos Gym (1995–present); Rickson Gracie Academy (2004–present); Dynamix MMA (2010–present)
- Rank: Fifth degree black belt in Kyokushin Budokai under Chris Dolman, Purple belt in Brazilian Jiu-Jitsu under Rickson Gracie
- Years active: 1997–2005 (kickboxing); 2001–2009 (MMA)

Kickboxing record
- Total: 17
- Wins: 17
- By knockout: 4

Mixed martial arts record
- Total: 14
- Wins: 8
- By knockout: 6
- By submission: 2
- Losses: 6
- By knockout: 2
- By submission: 1
- By decision: 3

Other information
- University: Vrije Universiteit Amsterdam
- Mixed martial arts record from Sherdog

Antoni Hardonk (born February 5, 1976) is a Dutch retired mixed martial artist and kickboxer who competed in K-1 and the UFC.

== Kickboxing career ==
Antoni made his K-1 debut at the K-1 World Grand Prix 2001 Preliminary Scandinavia on June 9, 2001 where he was participating in an eight-man elimination tournament. He faced Swede Fredic Rosenberg in the quarter-finals and quickly defeated him via technical knockout in the first round. In the semi-finals he faced another Swede, Wisam Feyli, who he defeated by a third round unanimous decision, thus booking his place in the tournament final. In the final match Antoni faced yet another Swede, Larry Lindwall, but was unable to win the tournament, losing instead by second-round technical knockout.

On September 29, 2002 Antoni would face fellow Dutch kickboxer and future K-1 Grand Prix Champion Remy Bonjasky at the It's Showtime – As Usual / Battle Time event in the Netherlands. Antoni held his own during the fight but eventually lost via a fifth round unanimous decision. He would lose his next couple of fights against Attila Karacs and Badr Hari respectively before ending a four fight losing streak on July 29, 2005, by defeating Croatian Domagoj Ostojic by third-round technical knockout at Ultimate Nokaut 2.

== Mixed martial arts career ==
=== Ultimate Fighting Championship ===
Hardonk was initially scheduled to make his promotional debut against Brad Imes at UFC 65 on November 18, 2006. However, Imes withdrew from the bout due to an injury and was replaced by his team mate Sherman Pendergarst. Hardonk won the fight by technical knockout due to low-kicks.

His next fight was at UFC Fight Night 9 on April 5, 2007 against Justin McCully, a late-notice replacement for Hardonk's original opponent, former UFC Heavyweight Champion Frank Mir, as he had to drop out due to a shoulder injury. Hardonk lost to McCully via unanimous decision.

Hardonk's next fight was against Frank Mir at UFC 74 on August 25, 2007. Hardonk lost due to a kimura lock early in the first round. Most recently, Antoni beat Colin Robinson at UFC 80 by TKO 17 seconds into the first round and Eddie Sanchez at UFC 85 by TKO in the second round. Hardonk returned to the Octagon on December 27, at UFC 92 where he defeated newcomer, Mike Wessel via second-round TKO. On April 18 UFC 97 he was defeated by Cheick Kongo via TKO of the second round. Pat Barry and Hardonk fought on October 24, 2009 at UFC 104. After some success with his kicks in the first round, his opponent found his range in the second with fast jab combinations, and Hardonk got hit before dropping and succumbing to strikes at 2:30 of round two.

== Retirement ==
In August 2010, Hardonk announced that he would be officially retiring from the UFC and MMA altogether. Hardonk also revealed that he will be partnering with his instructor since 2004, Henry Akins, to become a full-time trainer at his gym "Dynamix Martial Arts" located in Santa Monica.

== Championships and accomplishments ==
=== Martial arts ===
- International Kyokushin Budokai
  - Honorary promotion to Godan (Black belt, 5 Degree) in Kyokushin Budokai - Allround Fighting (as developed by Jon Bluming) by a board of martial arts grandmasters, among them legend Chris Dolman (10th Dan) & pioneer Jan van Looijen (8th Dan).

=== Mixed martial arts ===
- Ultimate Fighting Championship
  - Fight of the Night vs. Pat Barry at UFC 104

=== Kickboxing ===
- K-1
  - 2001 K-1 World Grand Prix Preliminary Scandinavia runner up

== Mixed martial arts record ==
Professional record breakdown
14 matches	8 wins	6 losses
By knockout	6	2
By submission	2	1
By decision	0	3

Res.	Record	Opponent	Method	Event	Date	Round	Time	Location	Notes
Loss	8–6	Pat Barry	TKO (punches)	UFC 104	October 24, 2009	2	2:30	Los Angeles, California, United States	Fight of the Night.
Loss	8–5	Cheick Kongo	TKO (punches)	UFC 97	April 18, 2009	2	2:29	Montreal, Quebec, Canada	
Win	8–4	Mike Wessel	TKO (punches)	UFC 92	December 27, 2008	2	2:09	Las Vegas, Nevada, United States	
Win	7–4	Eddie Sanchez	TKO (punches)	UFC 85	June 7, 2008	2	4:15	London, England	
Win	6–4	Colin Robinson	TKO (punches and leg kicks)	UFC 80	January 19, 2008	1	0:17	Newcastle upon Tyne, England	
Loss	5–4	Frank Mir	Submission (kimura)	UFC 74	August 25, 2007	1	1:17	Las Vegas, Nevada, United States	
Loss	5–3	Justin McCully	Decision (unanimous)	UFC Fight Night: Stevenson vs. Guillard	April 5, 2007	3	5:00	Las Vegas, Nevada, United States	
Win	5–2	Sherman Pendergarst	KO (punch and leg kick)	UFC 65: Bad Intentions	November 18, 2006	1	3:15	Sacramento, California, United States	
Win	4–2	Ibragim Magomedov	TKO (corner stoppage)	Bushido Europe: Rotterdam Rumble	October 9, 2005	2	2:01	Netherlands	
Win	3–2	Wes Sims	Submission (keylock)	K-1 Fighting Network Rumble on the Rock 2004	November 20, 2004	1	4:24	Honolulu, Hawaii, United States	
Loss	2–2	Claudineney Kozan	Decision (unanimous)	K-1 MMA ROMANEX	May 22, 2004	2	5:00	Saitama, Japan	
Loss	2–1	Grzegorz Jakubowski	Decision (unanimous)	La Resa Dei Conti 7	December 5, 2003	2	5:00	Livorno, Italy	
Win	2–0	Will Elworthy	Submission (rear-naked choke)	La Resa Dei Conti 7	December 5, 2003	1	N/A	Italy	
Win	1–0	Peter Verschuren	TKO (cut)	Rings Holland: Heroes Live Forever	January 28, 2001	1	3:05	Netherlands	

== Kickboxing record ==
As of December 2010, Hardonk has compiled a professional kickboxing record of five wins and five losses, with four wins and two losses by KO/TKO.

Professional record breakdown
85 matches	75 wins	10 losses
By knockout	44	2
By decision	31	8

Result	Record	Opponent	Method	Event	Date	Round	Time	Location
Win	5–5	(Croatia) Domagoj Ostojic	TKO	Ultimate Nokaut 2	July 29, 2005	3		Croatia
Loss	4–5	(Netherlands) Badr Hari	Decision	Rings Fightgala	September 27, 2003	5	3:00	Netherlands
Loss	4–4	(Hungary) Attila Karacs	TKO	Kings of the Ring European tournament	March 21, 2003	2		Brno, Czech Republic
Loss	4–3	(Netherlands) Remy Bonjasky	Decision	It's Showtime: As Usual / Battle Time	September 29, 2002	5	3:00	Netherlands
Loss	4–2	(Czech Republic) Pavel Majer	Decision	Victory or Hell 3	April 21, 2002	5	3:00	Amsterdam, Netherlands
Win	4–1	(Netherlands) Glenn Brasdorp	TKO	It's Showtime: Original	October 21, 2001	4		Haarlem, Netherlands
Loss	3–1	(Sweden) Larry Lindwall	TKO	K-1 World Grand Prix 2001 Preliminary Scandinavia, Final	June 9, 2001	2	2:56	Copenhagen, Denmark
Win	3–0	(Sweden) Wisam Feyli	Decision	K-1 World Grand Prix 2001 Preliminary Scandinavia, Semi-finals	June 9, 2001	3	3:00	Copenhagen, Denmark
Win	2–0	(Sweden) Fredic Rosenberg	TKO	K-1 World Grand Prix 2001 Preliminary Scandinavia, Quarter-finals	June 9, 2001	1	1:43	Copenhagen, Denmark
Win	1–0	(France) Philippe Gomis	KO	K-1 Survival 2000	May 28, 2000	2	0:55	Sapporo, Japan
