= Pat Barry (fighter) =

American kickboxer and mixed martial artist

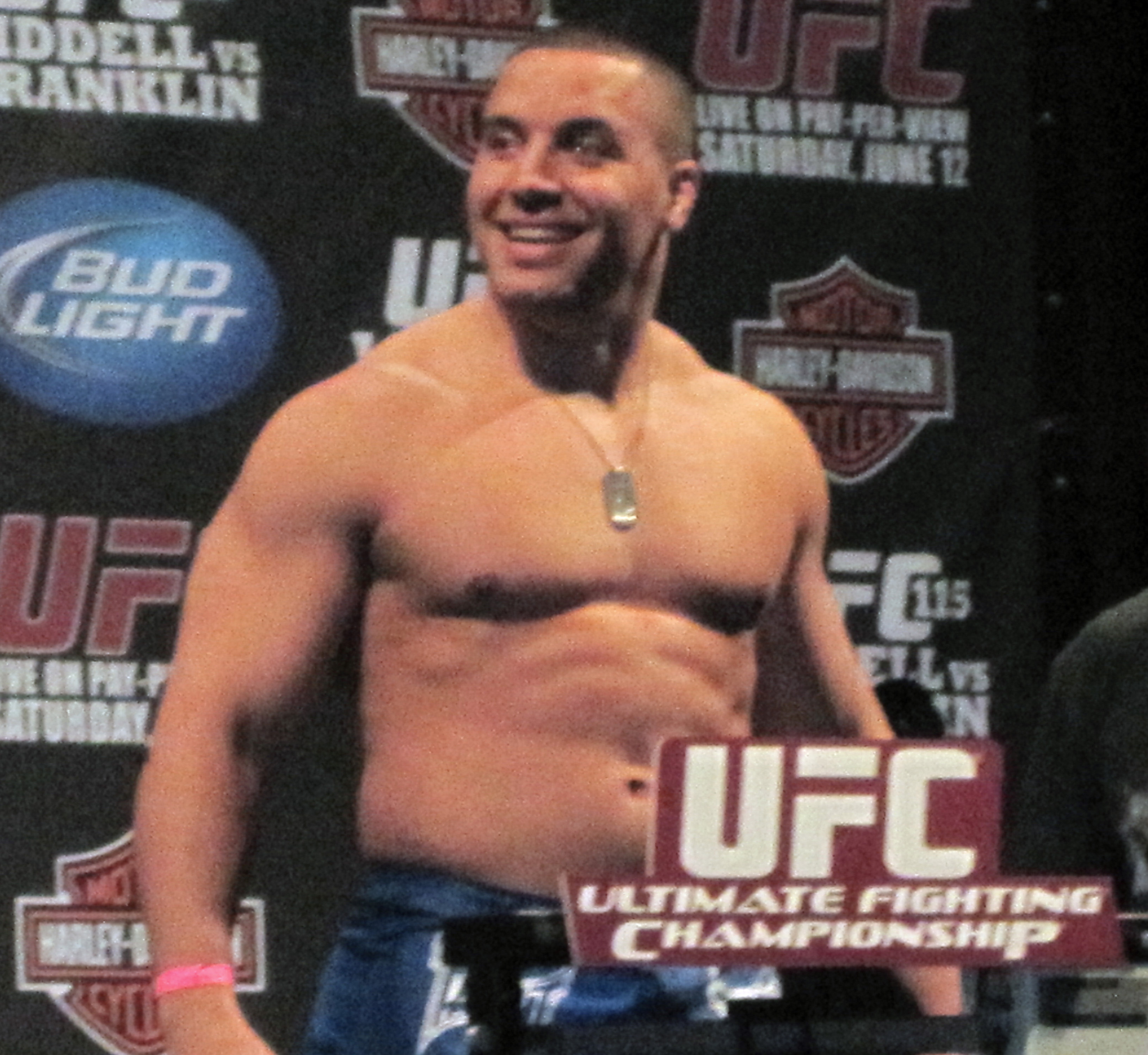
- Barry weighing in ahead of UFC 115 in June 2010
- Born: July 7, 1979 (age 47); New Orleans, Louisiana, U.S.
- Other names: HD
- Height: 5 ft 11 in (180 cm)
- Weight: 237 lb (108 kg; 16 st 13 lb)
- Division: Heavyweight MMA
- Reach: 74 in (188 cm)
- Style: Kickboxing, sanda
- Fighting out of: Denver, Colorado, United States
- Team: 303 Training Center (2016–present); Grudge Training Center (2012–2016); Minnesota Martial Arts Academy (2012); Team DeathClutch (2011–2012); Roufusport (2005–2006, 2008–2011); Team Mr. Perfect (2006–2008); Liu International (2002–2005); Russell Jones' Kickboxing Gym (2002)
- Trainer: Trevor Wittman (2012–present); Greg Nelson (2011–2012); Duke Roufus (2005–2006, 2008–2011); Ernesto Hoost (2006–2008); Shawn Liu (2002–2005); Russell Jones (2002)
- Rank: Black sash in Sanshou; Purple belt in Brazilian Jiu-Jitsu
- Years active: 2002–2007, 2014–2015 (kickboxing); 2008–2014 (MMA)

Kickboxing record
- Total: 24
- Wins: 17
- By knockout: 11
- Losses: 6
- By knockout: 2
- Draws: 1

Mixed martial arts record
- Total: 15
- Wins: 8
- By knockout: 7
- By decision: 1
- Losses: 7
- By knockout: 4
- By submission: 3

Other information
- University: Louisiana State University
- Mixed martial arts record from Sherdog
- Last updated on: May 3, 2014

Pat Barry
Medal record

Representing United States

Men's Sanshou

World Wushu Championships
Silver medal – second place	Macau 2003	90 kg

Pat Barry (born July 7, 1979) is an American former professional mixed martial artist and kickboxer who competed as a heavyweight in the Ultimate Fighting Championship. He is particularly known for his low kicks.

Barry began practicing Sanda while a college student and won numerous titles at domestic and international level before joining K-1 in 2005 where he competed for two years, mostly as a participant on the promotion's North American events.

In 2008, he embarked on a career in MMA, winning his first three fights by knockout before signing a contract with the Ultimate Fighting Championship and competing in the promotion for the next five years as a Heavyweight, compiling a 5–7 record with only one of the matches going the distance. Barry retired from MMA in late 2013 and returned to kickboxing the following year, joining Glory.

He is the fiancé and training partner of former UFC Women's Strawweight Champion Rose Namajunas.

== Background ==
Barry was born in New Orleans, Louisiana, to an American military veteran father of European descent and an African-American mother. Barry's parents opened bilingual elementary schools around the world and as a result Barry was raised in Bogotá, Colombia until the age of six. When his father died from cancer, he moved back to New Orleans with his mother, older sister and younger brother.

Although he did not start training in martial arts until the age of 21, Barry grew up a fan of ninjas, the Street Fighter video games and Jean-Claude Van Damme films, and often watched K-1 kickboxing in his youth. Barry has stated that his three heroes are his mother, Mike Tyson and Sagat, a Thai boxer from the Street Fighter video games.

He worked as a pizza delivery man prior to his career in professional fight sports.

== Career ==
=== Beginnings in Sanshou (2002–2005) ===
Hailing from Eastern New Orleans, Barry started training professionally in Wushu, sanshou and kickboxing at the age of twenty-one while a junior sociology major at the University of New Orleans when he walked into Russell Jones's Kickboxing Gym in Baton Rouge, Louisiana. He made his professional debut on November 2, 2002 at the U.S. Open International Martial Arts Championships in Las Vegas, Nevada, winning the Sanda Kungfu Federation (SKF) United States Heavyweight Championship with a fourth round knockout over Robert Parham. He then left Jones' gym and pursued kickboxing full-time with Master Shawn Liu at LIU International in New Orleans.

In June 2003, Barry fought twice at the Art of War: China Comes to Atlanta event in Atlanta, Georgia where he won both a US National Sanshou team spot and the SKF World Heavyweight Championship by knocking out Paul Gurevidius with a high kick. In November 2003, as a US National Wushu Team member, Barry participated at the 2003 World Wushu Championships in Macau, winning a silver medal in the −90 kg/198 lb division. He visited China numerous times from 2002 through 2008, amassing over fifty amateur bouts while competing in one of Shandong's stadiums and training with Chinese National Sanshou team at the Shaolin Temple.

On December 18, 2004, he won the K. Superstar Championship in New Orleans by KOing John Dixson, and a month later in Gulfport, Mississippi, he won the Kings of Kickboxing tournament by stopping Marshall Berger with low kicks in the final.

=== K-1 (2005–2007) ===
Having taken part in K-1 tryouts held in Las Vegas in 2004, Barry was recruited by kickboxing's premier organization and made his promotional debut against Scott Lighty in a tournament reserve bout at the K-1 World Grand Prix 2005 in Las Vegas on April 30, 2005, losing for the first time in his career by split decision.

In June 2005, he met with American kickboxing great Duke Roufus while he was commentating on an event in Biloxi, Mississippi and the two became close when Barry stayed with Roufus in Milwaukee, Wisconsin after losing his home in the Lower Ninth Ward of New Orleans during Hurricane Katrina, a tragedy which also claimed the life of his grandmother. After switching to Roufus' gym in Milwaukee, Barry won his first K-1 fight in his sophomore appearance when he knocked out Mark Selbee inside the opening frame at the K-1 World Grand Prix 2005 in Las Vegas II on August 13, 2005. Later that month Barry's grandmother was killed in Hurricane Katrina.

He fought to a split draw with Russian Kyokushin Karate stylist Aleksandr Pitchkounov in a non-tournament bout at the K-1 World Grand Prix 2005 in Tokyo Final at the Tokyo Dome on November 19, 2005. They rematched in the tournament reserve match at the K-1 World Grand Prix 2006 in Las Vegas on April 29, 2006, and Pitchkounov won by split decision.

Following this, Barry moved to Amsterdam to train under four-time K-1 World Grand Prix Champion Ernesto Hoost at "Team Mr. Perfect" based out of Vos Gym. Away from K-1, he defeated Scott Lighty in another rematch at Shin Do Kumate XI in Tampa, Florida on December 8, 2006. After hurting Lighty with low kicks throughout the first two rounds, Barry scored a high kick knockdown at the beginning of the third before finishing him off with another high kick shortly after.

He then returned to K-1 to compete in the eight-man tournament at the K-1 World Grand Prix 2007 in Hawaii on April 4, 2007. He was initially set to face Jan Nortje in the quarter-finals but his opponent was then changed to Gary Goodridge.

Barry twice sent Goodridge to the canvas with low kicks in the early going, the first ruled a slip, the second a legitimate down. He then landed a left high kick on the Trinidadian brawler and, although it did not knock him down, it opened a large cut which caused the ringside physician to call a halt to the bout and send Barry through to the semis where he had his rubber match with Aleksandr Pitchkounov. He was floored with a mawashi geri in round two and received a count from the referee in three after being injured when the Russian checked one of his low kicks, losing by unanimous decision.

Barry took part in his second K-1 tournament at the K-1 World Grand Prix 2007 in Las Vegas on August 11, 2007.

Drawn against Rickard Nordstrand in the quarter-finals, Barry scored a knockdown with a high kick inside the first twenty seconds before stopping the Swede with his patented low kicks in round two. He then went up against Zabit Samedov in the semifinals and lost via split decision after a back-and-forth fight.

In his final K-1 appearance, Barry lost to Freddy Kemayo via technical knockout due to a broken nose caused by a knee strike in the opening round of their contest at K-1 Fighting Network Prague 2007 on December 15, 2007.

=== World Combat League and transition to mixed martial arts (2008) ===
In 2008, Barry left Team Mr. Perfect and returned to Duke Roufus at Roufusport after a fallout with Ernesto Hoost, as he felt that the Dutch legend neglected him as a trainer and showed little faith in him. In an interview with Fight! magazine in 2009, Barry stated:

Ernesto Hoost just didn't give a fuck about me. He didn't care, man. I was like hey, I'm leaving, man and he was like so?.

Hoost denied Barry's claims in a 2014 interview, saying that he gave Barry "his all and didn't get a lot back". He also complimented Barry's physical ability but questioned his mental strength.

Barry competed a total of seven times between May and August 2008. Fighting in the World Combat League, a team-based kickboxing competition in which matches are fought over one round, he represented the New York Clash in the -107 kg/235 lb weight class and amassed a record of 3-1 with his only loss coming to a young Jarrell Miller.

He made his debut in mixed martial arts on May 30, 2008 against thirty-eight fight veteran Mike Delaney at Combat USA: Battle in the Bay 7 in Green Bay, Wisconsin and won by TKO in round one after felling his opponent with low kicks. He then knocked out John George with a high kick in his next outing at Combat USA: Fight Night on June 28, 2008 in Harris, Michigan. In his third fight with the promotion, Barry won the Combat USA Heavyweight title when he stopped fellow kickboxer Simon Diouf with low kicks at Combat USA: Battle in the Bay 8 on August 22, 2008.

He was set to face Andre Walker at Strikeforce: Payback in Broomfield, Colorado on October 3, 2008 but instead signed a contract with the Ultimate Fighting Championship and was replaced by Carlos Zevallos in that bout.

=== Ultimate Fighting Championship (2008–2013) ===
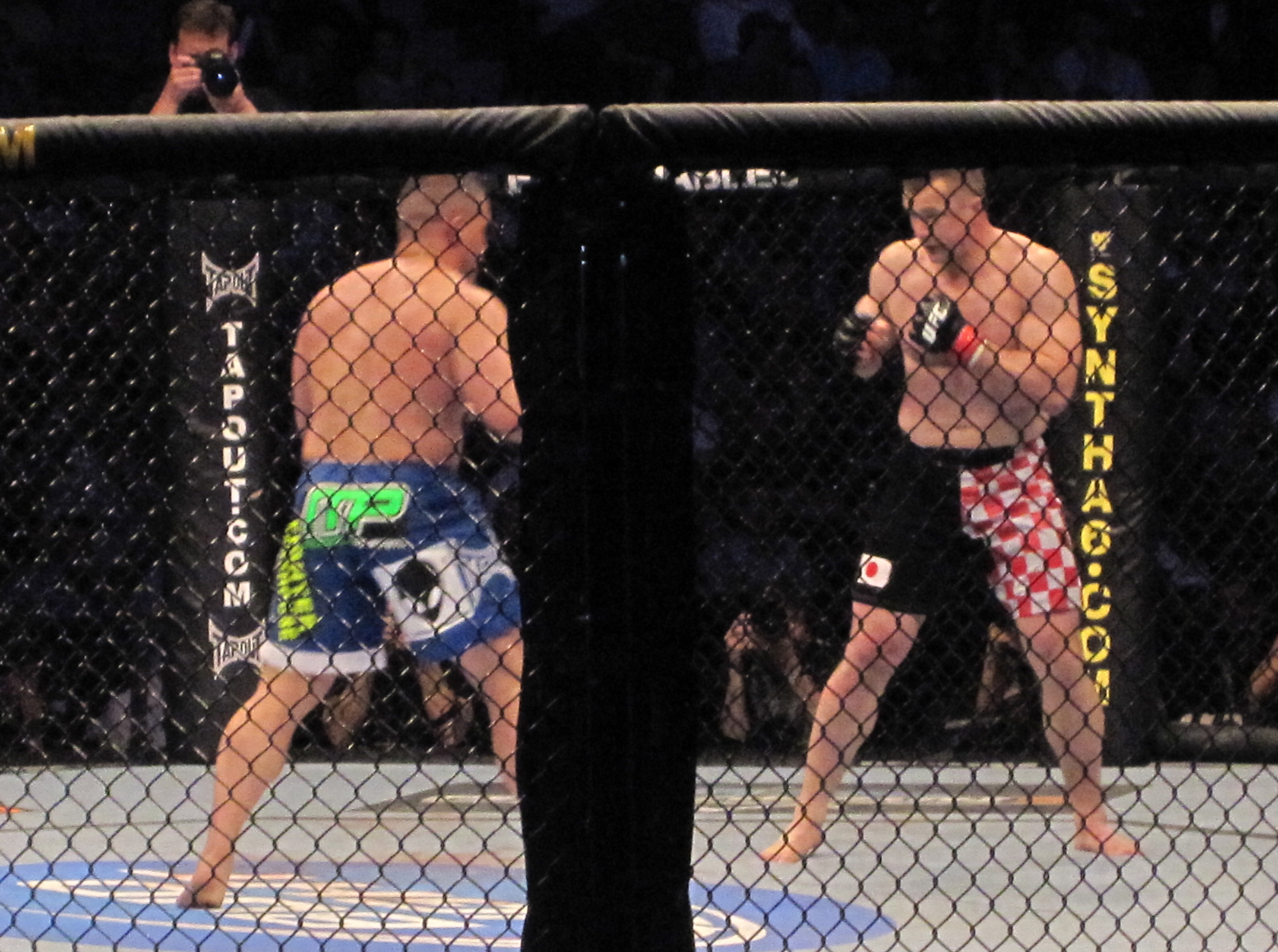
Barry was defeated by Mirko Cro Cop in the co-main event of UFC 115 in Vancouver, British Columbia, Canada in June 2010.

On December 27, 2008, Barry made his debut in the UFC against Dan Evensen at UFC 92 in Las Vegas, injuring the Norwegian's left knee with brutal low kicks at 2:36 of the first round thus winning via TKO.

He then fought UFC newcomer Tim Hague at UFC 98 on May 23, 2009. After winning much of the exchanges on the feet, Barry was taken down by Hague and submitted early in the first round with a guillotine choke.

His next fight was against fellow kickboxer Antoni Hardonk on October 24, 2009 at UFC 104 in Los Angeles, California. After weathering several powerful leg kicks and punches in the first round from Hardonk, Barry found his range in the second round with devastating fast jab combinations, stunning Hardonk several times before dropping him followed by a flurry of punches to finish the fight at 2:30 of the second round. The win earned him "Knockout of the Night" and "Fight of the Night" honors which brought his total fight purse to $134,000.

In a post-fight interview, he claimed to have previously been broke, living on ketchup and rice, and was six days from being evicted from his home. In addition to battling heavy financial burden, this fight was also very personal for Barry as he was fighting a member of Ernesto Hoost's training camp. Barry claimed that Hoost had given up on him, resulting in a falling-out between the two and that he waited five years for validation and finally got it when he knocked Hardonk out.

Barry was next scheduled to fight Gilbert Yvel, but his opponent was later changed.

Instead, he fought PRIDE 2006 Grand Prix champion Mirko Cro Cop in the co-main event at UFC 115 in Vancouver, Canada on June 12, 2010. Barry dropped and stunned Cro Cop twice in the first round, but ultimately lost the bout via submission due to a rear-naked choke in round three. Barry sustained a broken hand and foot in the fight and he was placed in a wheelchair in the immediate aftermath.

His next fight was against Joey Beltran at UFC: Fight For The Troops 2 on January 22, 2011, in Fort Hood, Texas. Barry used effective leg kicks in the bout to eventually wear down the mobility of Beltran and win a unanimous decision (30–27, 29–28, and 29–28). At the end of the bout, he jokingly "fired" Matt Mitrione. This was likely a joke based on Mitrione firing his agent publicly after a previous fight.

Barry fought fellow striker Cheick Kongo on June 26, 2011 in the main event of UFC on Versus 4 in Pittsburgh, Pennsylvania on June 26, 2011 and lost the fight in stunning fashion. Early in the first round Barry dropped and stunned Kongo, and delivered a flurry of strikes. Kongo weathered the assault and, still on wobbly legs, caught Barry with an overhand right on the ear followed by an uppercut to the chin, knocking Pat out cold. This was the first KO loss of Barry's career in both kickboxing and MMA.

Barry faced the tallest fighter in the UFC Stefan Struve on October 1, 2011 at UFC on Versus 6 in Washington, D.C. Barry was winning most of the striking exchanges midway into the second round but in a turn of events, Barry took Struve down to the mat and Struve locked in a triangle choke. Barry slammed Struve but left his arm exposed and Struve was able to secure an armbar. Barry lost by triangle armbar submission at 3:22 of the second round.

2011 also saw Barry leave Roufusport for Team DeathClutch in Alexandria, Minnesota. Barry faced highly touted brawler Christian Morecraft on January 20, 2012 at UFC on FX 1 in Nashville, Tennessee. Despite being caught early in an armbar, Barry escaped the submission attempt and won the fight via KO at 3:38 of the first round. His win over Morecraft earned him Fight of The Night honors for the second time in his career.

On May 5, 2012, Barry faced the heavy-handed Lavar Johnson at UFC on Fox 3 in East Rutherford, New Jersey and lost via TKO in the first round. Despite the loss, Barry was able to get a takedown during the fight, and even attempted a keylock submission. However, Johnson worked his way to his feet, trapped Barry against the cage, and began to tee off with punches until Barry dropped to the floor and the referee intervened to stop the fight.

Following Team DeathClutch's closure, Barry briefly moved to Greg Nelson's Minnesota Martial Arts Academy in Minneapolis, Minnesota in October 2012 before relocating to Arvada, Colorado to train under Trevor Wittman at the Grudge Training Center.

Barry faced former Muay Thai Champion Shane del Rosario at The Ultimate Fighter: Team Carwin vs. Team Nelson Finale on December 15, 2012. After a close first round where Barry was able to escape from some submission attempts, he connected with a huge left hand followed with a flurry of punches, finished by a devastating right hook, and won by KO at 0:26 of round two, earning Knockout of The Night honors for the second time.

He faced Shawn Jordan on June 15, 2013 at UFC 161, losing by TKO in round one. However, later reports came that the stoppage might have been caused by an eye poke from Jordan. The report showed that the uppercut Jordan landed (which seemed to daze Barry) wasn't an uppercut but an open hand blow. The report also showed that Jordan's fingers found their way into Barry's eyes. Following the uppercut, Barry was trying to protect the eye from the next of Jordan's punches. Barry did not mention that he had been poked in the eye, but pictures from the day after the fight show that he tapped to strikes three times.

In what would be his 12th and final UFC appearance, Barry was knocked out with vicious ground-and-pound from the mount by Soa Palelei on December 7, 2013 at UFC Fight Night 33 in Brisbane, Australia.

=== Return to kickboxing; Glory, and independent promotions (2014–2015) ===
On January 28, 2014, Barry announced his retirement from MMA via Twitter and his manager subsequently stated he would likely return to kickboxing. He appeared on Ariel Helwani's show the following month and announced that he had signed for world's top promotion, Glory.

In his first outing since returning to kickboxing, a warm-up fight ahead of his Glory debut, Barry defeated domestic heavyweight Ed Burris at Combat Sports Challenge 39 in Richmond, Virginia on March 22, 2014, scoring a knockdown with a bodyshot in round one before stopping Burris with a flurry of punches in round two.

He lost to Zack Mwekassa in the Glory 16: Denver - Heavyweight Contendership Tournament reserve match in Broomfield on May 3, 2014, suffering an early knockdown before being put away with a left uppercut towards the end of round one.

Just a day after this loss, it was reported that Barry was scheduled to rematch Mirko Cro Cop at Glory 17: Los Angeles in Inglewood, California on June 21, 2014. He withdrew from the fight for undisclosed reasons, however, and was replaced by Sergei Kharitonov.

Still under contract with Glory, Barry had his next fight in a different organization when he took on Demoreo Dennis at Legacy FC's first kickboxing event on January 16, 2015.

After an even first round, Barry started to land heavy leg kicks, from which he landed a knockdown in round 2, and punches, as well as using a good defense against his opponents strikes. Barry got the best of it for the last two rounds, earning the decision victory.

Barry was expected to return to Glory and face veteran Mourad Bouzidi on April 3, 2015 at Glory 20. However, Barry was forced out of the bout due to an injured hand and was replaced by Dustin Jacoby.

== Personal life ==
Barry is the fiancé and training partner of former UFC Women's Strawweight Champion Rose Namajunas. Namajunas and Barry met at Duke Roufus' gym, where Barry started training after losing his home to Hurricane Katrina in 2005, while Namajunas started training there during high school. Barry says he fell in love with Namajunas the first time he saw her. In a December 2014 interview, Barry said that he and Namajunas had been dating "for almost five years now", while Namajunas felt like it was "two or three years". The couple got engaged in 2014.

Following their fight at UFC 115 in June 2010, Barry and Mirko Cro Cop have developed a friendship and Barry frequently trains with Cro Cop at his training center in Zagreb, Croatia.

In August 2017, Barry claimed to have been one year sober after many years of alcohol and drug abuse. In his own words, he said that his daily routine after professional fighting had become "straight vodka, painkillers and cocaine for breakfast".

== Championships and accomplishments ==
=== Kickboxing ===
- Kings of Kickboxing
  - 2005 Kings of Kickboxing Tournament Championship
- U.S. Open International Martial Arts Championships
  - 2003 U.S. Open Sanshou Championship
  - 2004 U.S. Open Sanshou Championship
- Sanda Kungfu Federation
  - SKF United States Heavyweight Championship
  - SKF World Heavyweight Championship
- World Wushu Championships
  - 2003 World Wushu Championships −90 kg/198 lb Sanshou Silver Medalist (silver)

=== Mixed martial arts ===
- Combat USA
  - Combat USA Heavyweight Championship
- Ultimate Fighting Championship
  - Fight of the Night (two times) vs. Antoni Hardonk and Christian Morecraft
  - Knockout of the Night (two times) vs. Antoni Hardonk and Shane del Rosario
  - UFC.com Awards
    - 2012: Ranked #5 Knockout of the Year vs. Shane del Rosario

== Kickboxing record ==
Professional kickboxing record
17 wins (11 (T)KO's), 7 losses (2 (T)KOs, 4 decisions), 1 draw
Date	Result	Opponent	Event	Location	Method	Round	Time	
2015-01-16	Win	(United States) Demoreo Dennis	Legacy Kickboxing 1	Houston, Texas, US	Decision (split)	3	3:00	17-7-1
2014-05-03	Loss	(Democratic Republic of the Congo) Zack Mwekassa	Glory 16: Denver - Heavyweight Contender Tournament, Reserve Match	Broomfield, Colorado, US	KO (left uppercut)	1	2:33	16-7-1
2014-03-22	Win	(United States) Ed Burris	Combat Sports Challenge 39	Richmond, Virginia, US	TKO (punches)	2	0:30	16-6-1
2008-06-07	Win	(United States) Chris Hawk	WCL Finals	Tulsa, Oklahoma, US	Decision (15–3)	1	3:00	15-6-1
2008-06-07	Win	(United States) Matt Thomas	WCL Finals	Tulsa, Oklahoma, US	Decision (17–3)	1	3:00	14-6-1
2008-05-03	Loss	(United States) Jarrell Miller	WCL Eastern & Western Conference Finals	San Antonio, Texas, US	Decision (12–14)	1	3:00	13-6-1
2008-05-03	Win	(United States) John James	WCL Eastern & Western Conference Finals	San Antonio, Texas, US	Decision (16–8)	1	3:00	13-5-1
2007-12-15	Loss	(France) Freddy Kemayo	K-1 Fighting Network Prague 2007	Prague, Czech Republic	TKO (doctor stoppage)	1	1:41	12-5-1
2007-08-11	Loss	(Azerbaijan) Zabit Samedov	K-1 World Grand Prix 2007 in Las Vegas, Semi Finals	Las Vegas, Nevada, US	Decision (split)	3	3:00	12-4-1
2007-08-11	Win	(Sweden) Rickard Nordstrand	K-1 World Grand Prix 2007 in Las Vegas, Quarter Finals	Las Vegas, Nevada, US	KO (right low kick)	2	2:16	12-3-1
2007-04-04	Loss	(Russia) Aleksandr Pitchkounov	K-1 World Grand Prix 2007 in Hawaii, Semi Finals	Honolulu, Hawaii, US	Decision (unanimous)	3	3:00	11-3-1
2007-04-04	Win	(Trinidad and Tobago) Gary Goodridge	K-1 World Grand Prix 2007 in Hawaii, Quarter Finals	Honolulu, Hawaii, US	TKO (referee stoppage)	1	1:07	11-2-1
2006-12-08	Win	(United States) Scott Lighty	Shin Do Kumate XI	Tampa, Florida, US	KO (right high kick)	3	N/A	10-2-1
2006-04-29	Loss	(Russia) Aleksandr Pitchkounov	K-1 World Grand Prix 2006 in Las Vegas, Reserve Bout	Las Vegas, Nevada, US	Decision (split)	3	3:00	9-2-1
2005-11-19	Draw	(Russia) Aleksandr Pitchkounov	K-1 World Grand Prix 2005 in Tokyo Final	Tokyo, Japan	Draw (split)	3	3:00	9-1-1
2005-10-21	Win	(United States) Dustin Hanning	Heavyweight Gladiators	Milwaukee, Wisconsin, US	KO (low kicks)	1	N/A	9-1
2005-08-13	Win	(United States) Mark Selbee	K-1 World Grand Prix 2005 in Las Vegas II	Las Vegas, Nevada, US	KO	1	N/A	8-1
2005-04-30	Loss	(United States) Scott Lighty	K-1 World Grand Prix 2005 in Las Vegas, Reserve Bout	Las Vegas, Nevada, US	Decision (split)	3	3:00	7-1
2005-01-22	Win	(United States) Jayme McKinney	Kings of Kickboxing, Final	Gulfport, Mississippi, US	KO (low kicks)	1	N/A	7-0
Wins the 2005 Kings of Kickboxing Tournament Championship.
2005-01-22	Win	(United States) Marshall Berger	Kings of Kickboxing, Semi Finals	Gulfport, Mississippi, US	Decision (unanimous)	3	3:00	6-0
2005-01-22	Win	(United States) Eric Loveless	Kings of Kickboxing, Quarter Finals	Gulfport, Mississippi, US	KO (left high kick)	2	N/A	5-0
2004-12-18	Win	(United States) Anthony	U.S. Open Fighting Challenge	New Orleans, Louisiana, US	KO	N/A	N/A	4-0
2004-05-29	Win	(Netherlands) Marcel Donk	Zonnehuis	Amsterdam, Netherlands	Decision (unanimous)	3	3:00	3-0
2003-06-00	Win	(Lithuania) Paul Gurevidius	Art of War: China Comes to Atlanta	Atlanta, Georgia, US	KO (high kick)	2	N/A	2-0
Wins the SKF World Heavyweight Championship.
2002-11-02	Win	(United States) Robert Parham	Art of War: U.S. Open K. Superstar	Las Vegas, Nevada, US	KO (punches)	4	N/A	1-0
Wins the SKF United States Heavyweight Championship.
Legend: Win Loss Draw/no contest Notes

Amateur record
Date	Result	Opponent	Event	Location	Method	Round	Time
2003-11-00	Loss	(Egypt) Wael Moursi	2003 World Wushu Championships, Final	Macau	N/A	N/A	N/A
Wins the 2003 World Wushu Championships −90 kg/198 lb Sanshou Silver Medal.

Legend: Win Loss Draw/No contest Notes

== Mixed martial arts record ==
Professional record breakdown
15 matches	8 wins	7 losses
By knockout	7	4
By submission	0	3
By decision	1	0

Res.	Record	Opponent	Method	Event	Date	Round	Time	Location	Notes
Loss	8–7	Soa Palelei	KO (punches)	UFC Fight Night: Hunt vs. Bigfoot	December 7, 2013	1	2:09	Brisbane, Queensland, Australia	
Loss	8–6	Shawn Jordan	TKO (punches)	UFC 161	June 15, 2013	1	0:59	Winnipeg, Manitoba, Canada	
Win	8–5	Shane del Rosario	KO (punches)	The Ultimate Fighter 16 Finale	December 15, 2012	2	0:26	Las Vegas, Nevada, United States	Knockout of the Night.
Loss	7–5	Lavar Johnson	TKO (punches)	UFC on Fox: Diaz vs. Miller	May 5, 2012	1	4:38	East Rutherford, New Jersey, United States	
Win	7–4	Christian Morecraft	KO (punches)	UFC on FX: Guillard vs. Miller	January 20, 2012	1	3:38	Nashville, Tennessee, United States	Fight of the Night.
Loss	6–4	Stefan Struve	Submission (triangle choke)	UFC Live: Cruz vs. Johnson	October 1, 2011	2	3:22	Washington D.C., United States	
Loss	6–3	Cheick Kongo	KO (punch)	UFC Live: Kongo vs. Barry	June 26, 2011	1	2:39	Pittsburgh, Pennsylvania, United States	
Win	6–2	Joey Beltran	Decision (unanimous)	UFC: Fight for the Troops 2	January 22, 2011	3	5:00	Fort Hood, Texas, United States	
Loss	5–2	Mirko Cro Cop	Submission (rear-naked choke)	UFC 115	June 12, 2010	3	4:30	Vancouver, British Columbia, Canada	
Win	5–1	Antoni Hardonk	TKO (punches)	UFC 104	October 24, 2009	2	2:30	Los Angeles, California, United States	Knockout of the Night. Fight of the Night.
Loss	4–1	Tim Hague	Submission (guillotine choke)	UFC 98	May 23, 2009	1	1:42	Las Vegas, Nevada, United States	
Win	4–0	Dan Evensen	TKO (leg kicks)	UFC 92	December 27, 2008	1	2:36	Las Vegas, Nevada, United States	
Win	3–0	Simon Diouf	TKO (leg kicks)	Combat USA: Battle in the Bay 8	August 22, 2008	1	1:50	Green Bay, Wisconsin, United States	Won the Combat USA Heavyweight Championship.
Win	2–0	John George	KO (head kick)	Combat USA: Fight Night	June 28, 2008	1	0:49	Harris, Michigan, United States	
Win	1–0	Mike Delaney	TKO (leg kicks)	Combat USA: Battle in the Bay 7	May 30, 2008	1	3:25	Green Bay, Wisconsin, United States	
