= Robert Parham =

American kickboxer

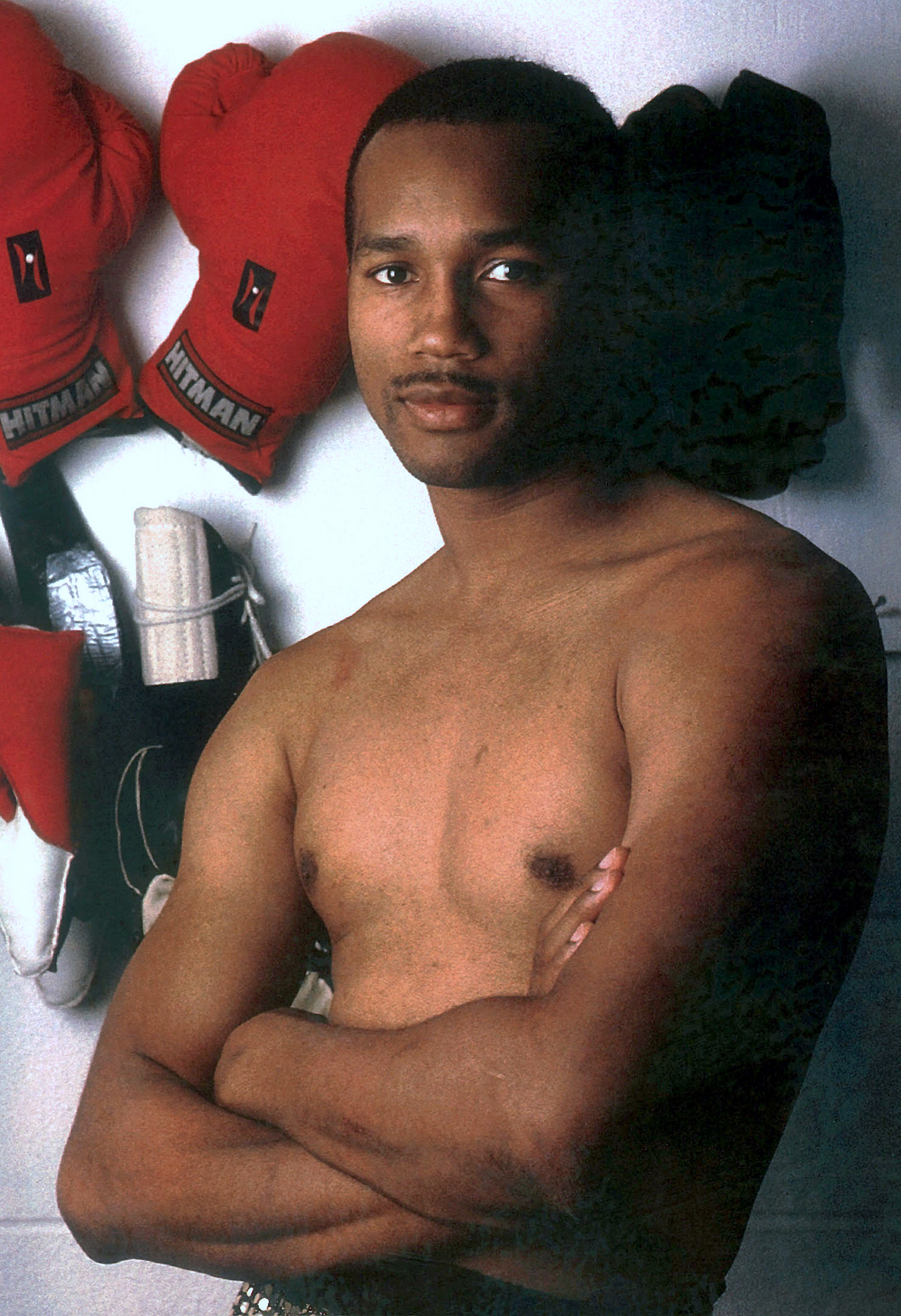
Parham in 1999

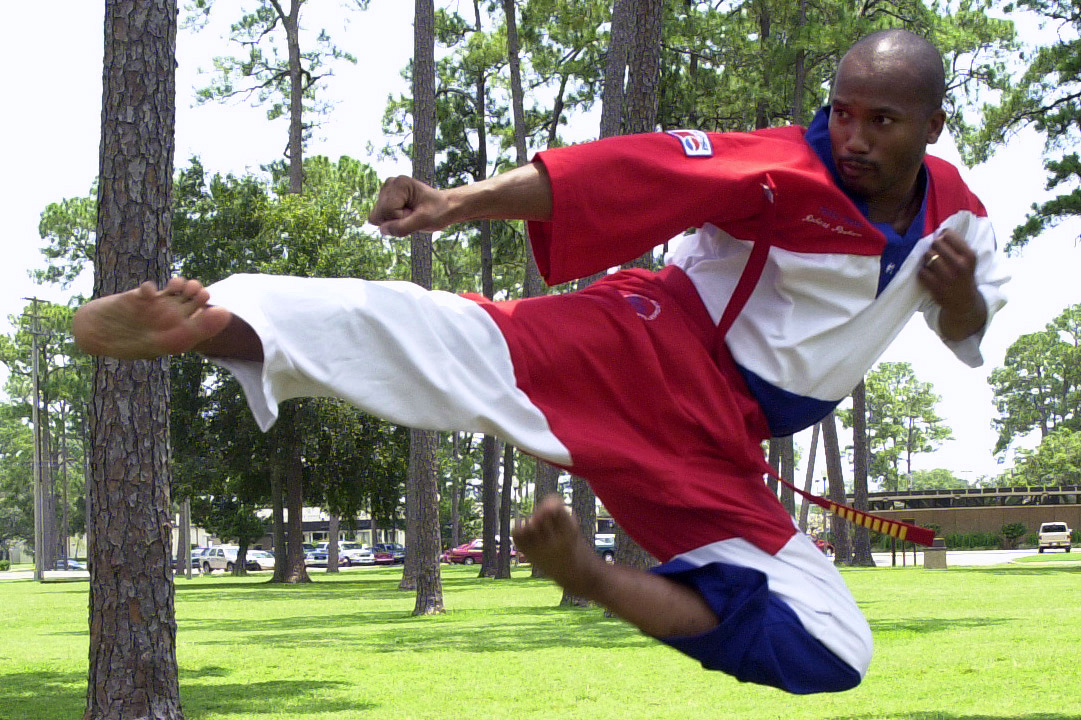
Parham demonstrates his skills in Mississippi in 2002

Robert Parham (born Robert Dennis Parham, Jr. on January 24, 1966) is a retired American kickboxer and former five-time World Kickboxing Champion and former four-time Sport Karate Champion. His kickboxing record was 17-1 with 9 knockouts. In his last match, he was stopped by Patrick Barry

"While enlisted in the Air Force, he won the Mississippi’s Silver Gloves championships and in 1988 he began earning karate titles, including Armed Forces Champion, Mississippi State Champion and pre-Olympic Taekwondo Champion.

From 1991 to 1993, he won the National Karate Championship and in 1991 he was the United States Karate Alliance World Karate Champion. He was Sport Karate International’s regional winner in 1990 and 1993 and world champion in 1991. In 1993, he earned the National Black Belt League’s Regional and World Titles and the United States Karate Alliance Lightweight Koshiki World Title.

Parham’s karate accomplishments earned him the Air Force’s Air Education and Training Command’s Male Athlete of the Year for 1992.

The award-winning martial artist has claimed world kickboxing titles in five weight classes — middleweight in 1994, super middleweight in 1996, light heavyweight in 1995 and 1997, cruiserweight in 1997 and heavyweight in 2001."

In 1999, Parham was a featured participant in the inaugural show of the TV series "The Toughman World Championship on FX". He made it to the finals and lost a hotly disputed decision to the local favorite.

He has been inducted into the Universal Martial Arts Hall of Fame, the Masters Hall of Fame, the USA Hall of Fame, The Martial Arts Museum, The All-Pro Tae Kwon Do Hall of Fame, The Gedatsuki Hall of Fame, The Kuro Bushi Hall of Honors and the Action Martial Arts Hall of Fame for his martial arts accomplishments.

After retiring from martial arts competitions, Robert turned to acting, with minor roles in movies such as "Bad Faith", "The Insider (film)" and "Hand to Hand". He had his breakthrough starring role in the multiple award winning mini feature "Buster Jones".

The actor, producer, director and writer has been featured in the Daily Republic, Solano County's News Source by reporter Amy Maginnis -Honey. She introduced Robert Parham working on his upcoming independent movie that premiered in Sacramento California called Jackson Bolt. The movie features Fred Williamson aka The Hammer, Robert Parham, R.Marcos Taylor, and James E. Meyer.

Hillside, New Jersey Mayor Angela R. Garretson has given Robert Parham Jr. a Proclamation Award. She declared on January 23, 2017 - January 27, 2017, Robert Parham Week.

Robert has collaborated and retained noted publicist Yolanda McIntosh of MizMacMarketing for interviews and public appearances.

Parham continues in his pursuit of producing movies. His latest films include "The BAM: The Willie Johnson Story", "Snow Black", "The Hanged Man", and his latest production, "Mad As Hell".
