= Aleksandr Pitchkounov =

Russian martial artist

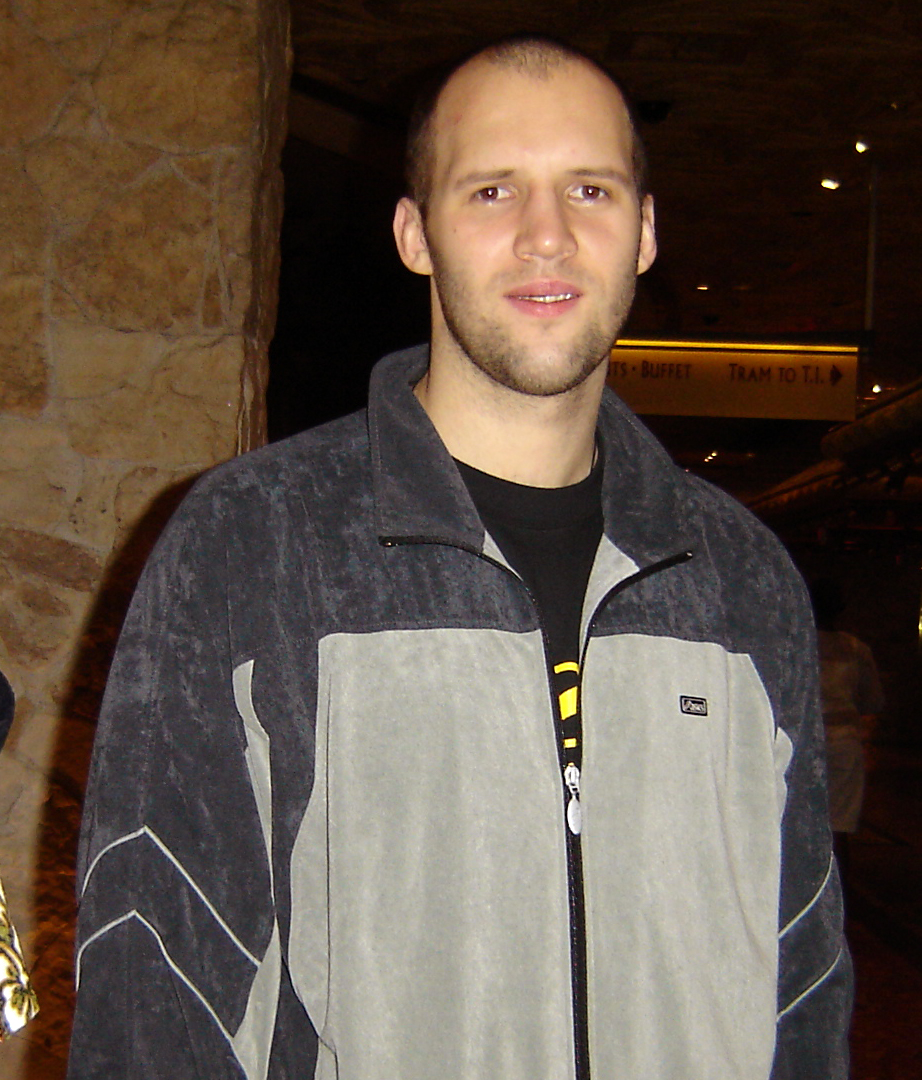
- Born: May 6, 1979 (age 47); Perm, Russian SFSR, USSR
- Native name: Александр Николаевич Пичкунов
- Nationality: Russia
- Height: 1.94 m (6 ft 4 in)
- Weight: 103 kg (227 lb; 16.2 st)
- Division: Heavyweight
- Style: Kyokushin Karate
- Team: Ichigeki Plaza
- Trainer: Jayson Vemoa; Fai Falamoe
- Rank: Black belt in Kyokushin kaikan
- Years active: 1999–2009

Kickboxing record
- Total: 17
- Wins: 12
- By knockout: 5
- Losses: 3
- By knockout: 2
- Draws: 2

Aleksandr N. Pitchkounov (Russian: Александр Николаевич Пичкунов; born May 6, 1979) is a former Russian heavyweight kickboxer and kyokushin karateka competing in K-1. He was the runner up at the K-1 World GP 2007 in Hawaii and K-1 World GP 2008 in Taipei tournament.

== Background ==
Pitchkounov began training in Kyokushin kaikan at age of 13 in 1993. He became a black belt in 1999 and started training kickboxing a year later after being interested by watching K-1-competitions. He finished third place in the 7th World Open Karate Tournament in Japan at the age of 20. During the tournament competition he knocked out Nicholas Pettas with a head kick.

== Career ==
Pitchkounov made his K-1 debut in May 2004, defeating Seth Petruzelli via TKO. After picking up two more wins in other promotions, he returned in 2005, defeating French fighter Rani Berbachi via decision. On November 19, 2005, at the K-1 World Grand Prix 2005 in Tokyo Final, Pitchkounov faced Pat Barry. The two fought to a draw, and had a rematch five months later, with Pitchkounov winning a close decision.

In 2007, he returned to face Japanese fighter Hiraku Hori. Pitchkounov defeated Hori after three knockdowns in the first round, all with punches.

In the quarterfinals of the K-1 World Grand Prix 2007 in Hawaii, he faced another Japanese fighter in Tatsufumi Tomihara. He won via third-round KO. In the semi-finals, he faced Pat Barry for a third time, winning a more clear-cut unanimous decision.

In the final, Pitchkonouv faced Samoan Mighty Mo. The fight was highly exciting; Pitchkonouv scored an early knockdown from a wheel kick to the head, before being knocked down twice with barrages of punches from the Samoan. In the third round, Pitchkonouv was dropped again from a series of hooks, but rose again. After getting dropped a fourth time in the fight with an overhand right, the fight was stopped.

Pitchkonouv fought twice more in 2007, defeating Tsuyoshi Nakasako and losing to Doug Viney via unanimous decision. He returned to K-1 in 2008, facing Chalid Arrab, whom he defeated via a close decision. After a decision over Nobu Hayashi in the quarterfinals, he faced Canadian MMA fighter Vaughn Anderson in the semi-finals. Greatly outmatching his opponent in size, Pitchkonouv won via first-round KO. In the finals of the 2008 K-1 World Grand Prix in Taipei, he faced fellow Russian Ruslan Karaev. After an errant low blow in the first round, Karaev knocked out Pitchkonouv with a left hook.

== Titles ==
- 2008 K-1 World GP in Taipei Finalist
- 2007 K-1 World Grand Prix in Hawaii Runner-Up

== Kickboxing record (incomplete) ==
12 Wins (5 (T)KO's, 7 Decisions), 3 Losses (2 (T)KO's, 1 Decisions), 2 Draws
Date	Result	Opponent	Event	Method	Round	Time
2008-07-13	Loss	(Russia) Ruslan Karaev	K-1 World Grand Prix 2008 in Taipei, final, Taipei, Taiwan	KO (Left hook)	1	2:03
Fight was for K-1 World Grand Prix 2008 in Taipei title.
2008-07-13	Win	(Canada) Vaughn Anderson	K-1 World Grand Prix 2008 in Taipei, semi finals, Taipei, Taiwan	KO	1	2:58
2008-07-13	Win	(Japan) Nobu Hayashi	K-1 World Grand Prix 2008 in Taipei, quarter finals, Taipei, Taiwan	Decision (Unanimous)	Ext.R.	3:00
2008-04-13	Win	(Germany) Chalid Arrab	K-1 World Grand Prix 2008 in Yokohama, Yokohama, Japan	Decision (Split)	2 Ext.R.	3:00
2007-08-11	Loss	(New Zealand) Doug Viney	K-1 World Grand Prix 2007 in Las Vegas, semi finals, Las Vegas, United States	Decision (Unanimous)	3	3:00
2007-08-11	Win	(Japan) Tsuyoshi Nakasako	K-1 World Grand Prix 2007 in Las Vegas, quarter finals, Las Vegas, United States	Decision (Unanimous)	3	3:00
2007-04-28	Loss	(American Samoa) Mighty Mo	K-1 World Grand Prix 2007 in Hawaii, final, Hawaii, United States	KO (Punches)	3	0:46
Fight was for K-1 World USA GP in 2007 title.
2007-04-28	Win	(United States) Patrick Barry	K-1 World Grand Prix 2007 in Hawaii, semi finals, Hawaii, United States	Decision (Unanimous)	3	3:00
2007-04-28	Win	(Japan) Tatsufumi Tomihira	K-1 World Grand Prix 2007 in Hawaii, quarter finals, Hawaii, United States	KO	3	1:00
2007-03-04	Win	(Japan) Hiraku Hori	K-1 World Grand Prix 2007 in Yokohama, Yokohama, Japan	KO	1	2:27
2006-04-29	Win	(United States) Patrick Barry	K-1 World Grand Prix 2006 in Las Vegas, Las Vegas, United States	Decision (Split)	3	3:00
2005-11-19	Draw	(United States) Patrick Barry	K-1 World Grand Prix 2005, Tokyo, Japan	Draw (Split)	3	3:00
2005-09-23	Win	(France) Rani Berbachi	K-1 World Grand Prix 2005 in Osaka - Final Elimination, Osaka, Japan	Decision (Unanimous)	3	3:00
2005-08-20	Win	(New Zealand) Hiriwa Terangi	Ichigeki Japan 2005, Japan	KO	1	2:53
2005-03-19	Win	(France) Cyrille Diabate	Ichigeki Paris 2005, France	Decision (Unanimous)	4	3:00
2004-05-30	Win	(United States) Seth Petruzelli	Kyokushin vs K-1 2004 All Out Battle, Tokyo, Japan	TKO	2	2:18

== See also ==
- List of K-1 events
- List of K-1 champions
- List of male kickboxers
