= Ruslan Karaev =

Russian kickboxer (born 1983)

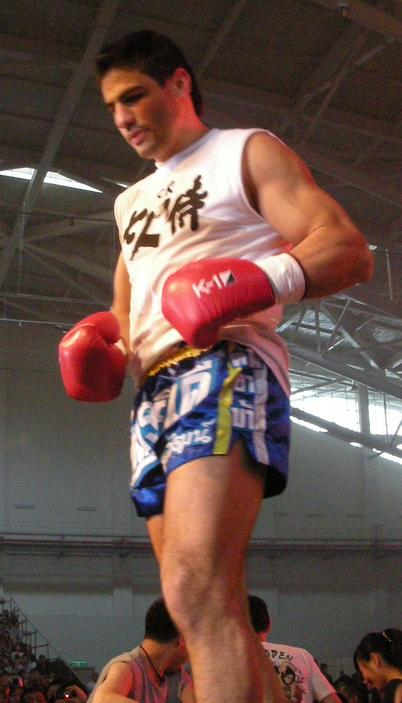
- Born: Ruslan Savelyevich Karaev (Karayev); May 19, 1983 (age 43); Ordzhonikidze, North Ossetian ASSR, Russian SFSR, Soviet Union
- Native name: Руслан Караев; Qaraty Ruslan; Хъараты Руслан
- Other names: Russian Machine Gun, Pride of Russia
- Height: 6 ft 1 in (1.85 m)
- Weight: 100 kg (220 lb; 15 st 10 lb)
- Division: Heavyweight
- Style: Kickboxing
- Fighting out of: Moscow, Russia
- Team: Golden Glory; Ihara Dojo; Marupro Gym
- Trainer: Cor Hemmers
- Years active: 2005 – 2010; 2013 – present

Kickboxing record
- Total: 24
- Wins: 15
- By knockout: 8
- Losses: 9
- By knockout: 6

Amateur record
- Total: 169
- Wins: 160
- By knockout: 125
- Losses: 9

Other information
- Website: www.ruslankaraev.com
- Last updated on: December 5, 2009

Ruslan Savelyevich Karaev (Karayev) (Russian: Русла́н Саве́льевич Кара́ев, romanized: Ruslan Savelyevich Karayev; Iron Ossetic: Хъараты Савелийы фырт Руслан, romanized: Qaraty Savelijy fyrt Ruslan; born May 19, 1983) is a Russian kickboxer. He is K-1 World GP 2005 in Las Vegas and K-1 World Grand Prix 2008 in Taipei tournament champion. He joined the Golden Glory's K-1 stable, training under Cor Hemmers.

== Biography and career ==
On August 13, 2005 Ruslan Karaev made his K-1 tournament debut at K-1 World GP 2005 in Las Vegas as a virtual unknown. In quarter finals Karaev faced Freddy Kemayo of France and won the bout by 1 round spinning back kick KO that caught Kemayo in the midsection. In the semifinals, Karaev faced muay thai stylist Azem Maksutaj, what was later acknowledged as one of the greatest battles of K-1 history. He topped his performance of the night by a unanimous decision win over American Scott Lighty and was crowned the tournament champion.

On September 23, 2005 at the K-1 World GP final eliminations in Osaka Dome, Japan he faced Rickard Nordstrand from Sweden the replacement fighter of four time World Champion Ernesto Hoost who had to pull out due to a leg injury. Ruslan won the fight by unanimous decision and earned his first appearance at the K-1 World Grand Prix 2005 Finals.

Ruslan finished up his rookie year in K-1 on November 19, 2005 at the Tokyo Dome, his quarterfinal opponent was Musashi. Ruslan lost the fight by an extra round decision.

Karaev made it to the K-1 World GP 2006 Final after a Knocking Out win over Badr Hari Where he was knocked out in the first round by Glaube Feitosa.

In 2007 Karaev suffered two more consecutive knockout losses to Badr Hari and Melvin Manhoef.

Ruslan missed his announced fight against Jerome Le Banner on September 29, 2007 at K-1 World GP 2007 final elimination in Seoul, Korea, due to a traffic accident suffered several days before the match.

After caring for his sick mother Ruslan came back to K-1 in July 2008 in the K-1 World GP 2008 in Taipei tournament. Karaev knocked out all three of his opponents to secure a spot at the K-1 World GP 2008 Final 16. He fought and knocked out Chalid Arrab in the second round to be given a spot in the quarterfinals of the K-1 World GP 2008 Final, against Gokhan Saki. Ruslan again was not able to get past the quarterfinals after losing a decision.

At the K-1 World Grand Prix 2009 Final 16 Karaev beat the new and current heavyweight champion, Keijiro Maeda by unanimous decision.

In his fourth appearance at the K-1 World Grand Prix Finals he was knocked out in the first round in a 3rd match against Badr Hari.

Ruslan Karaev was scheduled to fight Le Banner in April 2010, Yokohama, but that fight got cancelled because of an injured knee. Karaev got replaced by Tyrone Spong.

After a three-year hiatus due to a knee injury and falling out with Golden Glory, Karaev announced his comeback in October 2013, signing with the Moldovan-based King of Kings promotion.

== Titles ==
Professional

- 2008 K-1 World Grand Prix in Taipei champion
- 2005 K-1 World Grand Prix in Las Vegas II champion

Amateur

- 2003 W.A.K.O. World Championships (gold) -91 kg (Full-Contact)
- 2003 Amateur Kickboxing European champion (gold)
- 2002 Amateur Kickboxing European tournament finalist

== Kickboxing record ==
Kickboxing Record
15 Wins (8 (T) KO's, 6 decisions), 9 Losses
Date	Result	Opponent	Event	Location	Method	Round	Time	Record
2009-12-05	Loss	(Morocco) Badr Hari	K-1 World Grand Prix 2009 Final	Yokohama, Japan	KO (right hook)	1	0:38	15-9
2009-10-17	Loss	(Netherlands) Hesdy Gerges	Ultimate Glory 11: A Decade of Fights	Amsterdam, Netherlands	Decision (unanimous)	3	3:00	15-8
Fight was for WFCA World (K-1 rules) Super Heavyweight (+95 kg) title.
2009-09-26	Win	(Japan) Kyotaro	K-1 World Grand Prix 2009 Final 16	Seoul, Republic of Korea	Decision (unanimous)	3	3:00	15-7
2008-12-06	Loss	(Turkey) Gokhan Saki	K-1 World GP 2008 Final	Yokohama, Japan	Decision (unanimous)	3	3:00	14-7
2008-09-27	Win	(Germany) Chalid Arrab	K-1 World GP 2008 Final 16	Seoul, Korea	TKO (Referee Stoppage)	2	2:30	14-6
2008-07-13	Win	(Russia) Aleksandr Pitchkounov	K-1 World GP 2008 in Taipei	Taipei City, Taiwan	KO (left hook)	1	2:03	13-6
Wins K-1 World GP 2008 in Taipei championship.
2008-07-13	Win	(South Korea) Young-Hyun Kim	K-1 World GP 2008 in Taipei	Taipei City, Taiwan	TKO (doctor stoppage)	1	0:15	12-6
2008-07-13	Win	(Japan) Tatsufumi Tomihira	K-1 World GP 2008 in Taipei	Taipei City, Taiwan	KO (left hook)	3	2:20	11-6
2008-03-09	Win	(Japan) Hiromi Amada	Magnum16, All Japan Kickboxing	Tokyo, Japan	KO (punches)	3	2:06	10-6
2007-06-23	Loss	(Netherlands) Melvin Manhoef	K-1 World GP 2007 in Amsterdam	Amsterdam, Netherlands	KO (left hook)	1	0:31	9-6
2007-03-04	Loss	(Morocco) Badr Hari	K-1 World GP 2007 in Yokohama	Yokohama, Japan	KO (right Cross)	2	2:46	9-5
2006-12-02	Loss	(Brazil) Glaube Feitosa	K-1 World GP 2006 Final	Tokyo, Japan	KO (High kick)	1	1:11	9-4
2006-09-30	Win	(Morocco) Badr Hari	K-1 World Grand Prix 2006 in Osaka opening round	Osaka, Japan	KO (right punch)	1	0:52	9-3
2006-08-12	Win	(United States) Dewey Cooper	K-1 World Grand Prix 2006 in Las Vegas II	Las Vegas, NV	Decision (unanimous)	3	3:00	8-3
2006-06-03	Loss	(New Zealand) Ray Sefo	K-1 World Grand Prix 2006 in Seoul	Seoul, Korea	KO (right hook)	1	1:42	7-3
2006-04-29	Win	(Germany) Stefan Leko	K-1 World GP 2006 in Las Vegas	Las Vegas, NV	Decision (unanimous)	3	3:00	7-2
2005-11-19	Loss	(Japan) Musashi	K-1 World Grand Prix 2005	Tokyo, Japan	Ext. R Decision (unanimous)	4	3:00	6-2
2005-09-23	Win	(Sweden) Rickard Nordstrand	K-1 World Grand Prix 2005 in Osaka – final elimination	Osaka, Japan	Decision (unanimous)	3	3:00	6-1
2005-08-13	Win	(United States) Scott Lighty	K-1 World Grand Prix 2005 in Las Vegas II	Las Vegas, NV	Decision (unanimous)	3	3:00	5-1
Wins K-1 World GP 2005 in Las Vegas II championship.
2005-08-13	Win	(Albania) Azem Maksutaj	K-1 World Grand Prix 2005 in Las Vegas II	Las Vegas, NV	Decision (unanimous)	3	3:00	4-1
2005-08-13	Win	(France) Freddy Kemayo	K-1 World Grand Prix 2005 in Las Vegas II	Las Vegas, NV	KO (Spinning back Mid-kick)	1	1:39	3-1
2005-06-17	Loss	(New Zealand) Ray Sefo	K-1 World Grand Prix 2005 in Hiroshima	Hiroshima, Japan	TKO (Referee Stoppage)	1	0:37	2-1
2003	Win	(Hungary) Gabor Meiszter	W.A.K.O. World Championships 2003	Paris, France	KO	2		2-0
2003	Win	(Romania) Corneliu Rus	W.A.K.O. World Championships 2003	Paris, France				1-0
Legend: Win Loss Draw/No contest Notes

== See also ==
- List of K-1 Events
- List of K-1 champions
- List of male kickboxers
