= UFC 104 =

UFC mixed martial arts event in 2009

UFC 104: Machida vs. Shogun
- The poster for UFC 104: Machida vs. Shogun
- Promotion: Ultimate Fighting Championship
- Date: October 24, 2009
- Venue: Staples Center
- City: Los Angeles, California
- Attendance: 14,892
- Total gate: $1,913,093
- Buyrate: 500,000

Event chronology
UFC 103: Franklin vs. Belfort	UFC 104: Machida vs. Shogun	UFC 105: Couture vs. Vera

UFC 104: Machida vs. Shogun was a mixed martial arts event held by the Ultimate Fighting Championship (UFC) on October 24, 2009, in Los Angeles, California.

== Background ==
As with UFC 103, the UFC announced a portion of the preliminary card would air live and commercial-free during an hour-long block on Spike.

Chase Gormley, who was slated to face Ben Rothwell, instead faced Stefan Struve after Rothwell's opponent was changed to Cain Velasquez. An injured Sean Sherk was replaced by Josh Neer against Gleison Tibau.

Additionally, on the day of the weigh-in, two fights were changed to catchweight status as Anthony Johnson, Josh Neer and Gleison Tibau all came in over the weight limit of their respective weight classes.

== Results ==
Main card
Weight class				Method	Round	Time	Notes
Light Heavyweight	Lyoto Machida (c)	def	Maurício Rua	Decision (unanimous) (48–47, 48–47, 48–47)	5	5:00	(Note: For the UFC Light Heavyweight Championship.)
Heavyweight	Cain Velasquez	def	Ben Rothwell	TKO (punches)	2	0:58
Catchweight (157 lb)	Gleison Tibau	def	Josh Neer	Decision (unanimous) (30–27, 30-27, 29–28)	3	5:00
Lightweight	Joe Stevenson	def	Spencer Fisher	TKO (punches)	2	4:03
Catchweight (176 lb)	Anthony Johnson	def	Yoshiyuki Yoshida	KO (punch)	1	0:41
Preliminary card (Spike TV)
Light Heavyweight	Ryan Bader	def	Eric Schafer	Decision (unanimous) (30–27, 29–26, 30–27)	3	5:00
Heavyweight	Pat Barry	def	Antoni Hardonk	TKO (punches)	2	2:30
Preliminary card
Middleweight	Chael Sonnen	def	Yushin Okami	Decision (unanimous) (30–27, 30–27, 30–27)	3	5:00
Middleweight	Jorge Rivera	def	Rob Kimmons	TKO (punches)	3	1:53
Light Heavyweight	Kyle Kingsbury	def	Razak Al-Hassan	Decision (split) (28–29, 29–28, 29–28)	3	5:00
Heavyweight	Stefan Struve	def	Chase Gormley	Submission (triangle choke)	1	4:04

== Bonus awards ==
The following fighters received $60,000 bonuses.

- Fight of the Night: Antoni Hardonk vs. Pat Barry
- Knockout of the Night: Pat Barry
- Submission of the Night: Stefan Struve

== Reported payout ==
The following is the reported payout to the fighters as reported to the California State Athletic Commission. It does not include sponsor money or "locker room" bonuses often given by the UFC.

- Lyoto Machida: ($200,000, includes $100,000 win bonus) def. Maurício Rua: (250,000) ^
- Cain Velasquez: ($70,000 includes $35,000 win bonus) def. Ben Rothwell: ($50,000)
- Gleison Tibau: ($38,000 includes $19,000 win bonus) def. Josh Neer: ($14,000)
- Joe Stevenson: ($94,000 includes $47,000 win bonus) def. Spencer Fisher: ($26,000)
- Anthony Johnson: ($30,000 includes $15,000 win bonus) def. Yoshiyuki Yoshida: ($12,000) ^
- Ryan Bader: ($30,000 includes $15,000 win bonus) def. Eric Schafer: ($13,000)
- Pat Barry: ($14,000 includes $7,000 win bonus) def. Antoni Hardonk: ($16,000)
- Chael Sonnen: ($54,000 includes $27,000 win bonus) def. Yushin Okami: ($18,000)
- Jorge Rivera: ($36,000 includes $18,000 win bonus) def. Rob Kimmons: ($9,000)
- Kyle Kingsbury: ($16,000 includes $8,000 win bonus) def. Razak Al-Hassan: ($3,000)
- Stefan Struve: ($14,000 includes $7,000 win bonus) def. Chase Gormley: ($10,000)

^ Anthony Johnson was reportedly fined 20 percent of his purse for failing to make the 170-pound welterweight limit. The CSAC's initial report did not include information on the penalty.

^ Due to the controversy surrounding the main event Rua received his full pay including his win bonus.

== See also ==
- Ultimate Fighting Championship
- List of UFC champions
- List of UFC events
- 2009 in UFC
