= Tsuyoshi Nakasako =

Japanese heavyweight kickboxer

- Born: January 29, 1974 (age 52); Toyonaka, Osaka, Japan
- Native name: 中迫剛
- Other names: The Demon Prince; The Nobleman of Japan; Sako
- Nationality: (Japan) Japanese
- Height: 1.90 m (6 ft 3 in)
- Weight: 100 kg (220 lb; 15 st 10 lb)
- Division: Heavyweight
- Style: Seidokaikan karate
- Fighting out of: Osaka, Japan
- Team: ZEBRA 244
- Years active: 1998–2008

Kickboxing record
- Total: 46
- Wins: 19
- By knockout: 7
- Losses: 26
- By knockout: 11
- Draws: 1

Tsuyoshi Nakasako (Japanese: 中迫剛; born January 29, 1974) is a Japanese retired heavyweight kickboxer who competed in K-1. During his ten-year career from 1998 until 2008, he fought a variety of K-1 champions including Ernesto Hoost, Peter Aerts, Remy Bonjasky, Mark Hunt, and Andy Hug.

== Career ==
Nakasako made his professional kickboxing debut on May 24 at the K-1 Braves '98 event in Fukuoka. In a dominant effort, he earned a TKO victory over taekwondo champion Pierre Guenette. Three months later, he reached the finals of the K-1 Japan Grand Prix '98 tournament before suffering his first defeat: a majority decision loss to former world champion Masaaki Satake. Losses Stan Longinidis and Andy Hug followed, but Nakasako rebounded with wins over world champion Dewey Cooper and Muay Thai exponent Tofan Pirani. He reached the semifinals of the K-1 Spirits '99 and K-1 Andy Memorial events, but endured decision losses to Nobu Hayashi and Musashi, respectively.

Despite an eventual TKO loss, Nakasako made a strong showing against K-1 World Grand Prix 2001 winner Mark Hunt at K-1 Rising 2002, scoring a knockdown with a kick to the head and pressuring the champion effectively. This was followed shortly afterwards with a disqualification win over the debuting Bob Sapp at K-1 Survival 2002, awarded after Sapp shoved Nakasako into the corner, threw him to the ground and repeatedly struck him while he was down. Nakasako next entered the K-1 Andy Spirits tournament, where he dominantly made his way to the finals and fought five rounds to an eventual decision loss against Musashi.

At K-1 Burning 2004, Naksako faced Remy Bonjasky in the Dutchman's first match after winning the K-1 World Grand Prix 2003. After a dynamic bout wherein the Japanese fighter appropriated his opponent's signature flying knee attacks, Nakasako eventually suffered a TKO in the closing seconds of the final round. He came back with an impressive first round knockout of Mavrick Harvery, effectively dominating the cage fighter. Further tournament competition followed, with Nakasako continuing to fall short but nevertheless achieving the occasional surprising victory, such as his defeat of his rival Kaoklai Kaennorsing at the K-1 World Grand Prix 2006 in Seoul.

Naksako entered his final tournament - the K-1 World Grand Prix 2008 in Fukuoka - on June 29. After defeating Bernard Ackah in the quarterfinals, he moved on to face karate champ Ewerton Teixeira and lost by unanimous decision. This was his last match to date, leaving him with a professional record of 19 wins, 26 losses, and 1 draw.

== Titles ==
- K-1 Andy Spirits 2002 Finalist
- K-1 Japan Grand Prix '98 Finalist

== Kickboxing record ==
Kickboxing Record
19 Wins (7 (T)KO's, 12 Decisions), 26 Losses, 0 No Contest, 1 Draw
Date	Result	Opponent	Event	Location	Method	Round	Time	Record
2008-06-29	Loss	(Brazil) Ewerton Teixeira	K-1 World Grand Prix 2008 in Fukuoka Semifinal	Fukuoka, Japan	Decision (Unanimous)	3	3:00	19-26-1
2008-06-29	Win	(Ivory Coast) Bernard Ackah	K-1 World Grand Prix 2008 in Fukuoka Quarterfinal	Fukuoka, Japan	Decision (Unanimous)	3	3:00	19-25-1
2008-04-13	Win	(Japan) Takumi Sato	K-1 World Grand Prix 2008 in Yokohama	Yokohama, Japan	Decision (Unanimous)	3	3:00	18-25-1
2007-08-11	Loss	(Russia) Alexander Pitchkounov	K-1 World Grand Prix 2007 in Las Vegas Quarterfinal	Las Vegas, USA	Decision (Unanimous)	3	3:00	17-25-1
2007-03-04	Loss	(Azerbaijan) Zabit Samedov	K-1 World Grand Prix 2007 in Yokohama	Yokohama, Japan	Decision (Majority)	3	3:00	17-24-1
2006-07-30	Loss	(Switzerland) Björn Bregy	K-1 World Grand Prix 2006 in Sapporo	Sapporo, Japan	KO (Right hook)	1	2:35	17-23-1
2006-06-03	Loss	(Japan) Yusuke Fujimoto	K-1 World Grand Prix 2006 in Seoul Semifinal	Seoul, South Korea	Decision (Majority)	3	3:00	17-22-1
2006-06-03	Win	(Thailand) Kaoklai Kaennorsing	K-1 World Grand Prix 2006 in Seoul Quarterfinal	Seoul, South Korea	Decision (Unanimous)	3	3:00	17-21-1
2005-08-22	Loss	(Thailand) Kaoklai Kaennorsing	Titans 2nd	Tokyo, Japan	Decision (Unanimous	3	3:00	16-21-1
2005-06-14	Loss	(Japan) Hiraku Hori	K-1 World Grand Prix 2005 in Hiroshima Quarterfinal	Hiroshima, Japan	Decision (Unanimous)	3	3:00	16-20-1
2005-04-30	Loss	(United States) Mark Selbee	K-1 World Grand Prix 2005 in Las Vegas Quarterfinal	Las Vegas, USA	Decision (Unanimous)	3	3:00	16-19-1
2004-07-17	Loss	(Thailand) Kaoklai Kaennorsing	K-1 World Grand Prix 2004 in Seoul Semifinal	Seoul, South Korea	Decision (Unanimous)	3	3:00	16-18-1
2004-07-17	Win	(South Korea) Myeon Ju Lee	K-1 World Grand Prix 2004 in Seoul Quarterfinal	Seoul, South Korea	Decision (Unanimous)	3	3:00	16-17-1
2004-06-26	Loss	(Japan) Nobu Hayashi	K-1 Beast 2004 in Shizuoka Quarterfinal	Shizuoka, Japan	Decision (Unanimous)	3	3:00	15-17-1
2004-03-14	Win	(United States) Mavrick Harvey	K-1 Beast 2004 in Niigata	Niigata, Japan	KO	1	1:30	15-16-1
2004-02-15	Loss	(Netherlands) Remy Bonjasky	K-1 Burning 2004	Okinawa, Japan	KO (Left high kick)	3	2:54	14-16-1
2003-09-21	Loss	(Japan) Hiromi Amada	K-1 Survival 2003 Quarterfinal	Yokohama, Japan	2nd Ext.R Decision (Unanimous)	5	3:00	14-15-1
2003-06-29	Loss	(Netherlands) Peter Aerts	K-1 Beast II 2003	Saitama, Japan	KO (High kick)	2	1:42	14-14-1
2003-04-06	Loss	(South Africa) Mike Bernardo	K-1 Beast 2003	Yamagata, Japan	TKO	2	1:02	14-13-1
2002-09-22	Loss	(Japan) Musashi	K-1 Andy Spirits Final	Osaka, Japan	2nd Ext.R Decision (Unanimous)	5	3:00	14-12-1
Fight was for the K-1 Andy Spirits title.
2002-09-22	Win	(Japan) Yusuke Fujimoto	K-1 Andy Spirits Semifinals	Osaka, Japan	KO (Punch)	2	2:18	14-11-1
2002-09-22	Win	(Japan) Ryuta Noji	K-1 Andy Spirits Quarterfinal	Osaka, Japan	Decision (Unanimous)	3	3:00	13-11-1
2002-06-02	Win	(United States) Bob Sapp	K-1 Survival 2002	Toyama, Japan	DQ	1	1:30	12-11-1
Sapp was disqualified after striking Nakasako on the ground.
2002-04-21	Loss	(Netherlands) Ernesto Hoost	K-1 Burning 2002	Hiroshima, Japan	KO	1	1:46	11-11-1
2002-01-27	Loss	(New Zealand) Mark Hunt	K-1 Rising 2002	Shizuoka, Japan	TKO (Referee stoppage)	2	2:55	11-10-1
2001-08-19	Loss	(Japan) Musashi	K-1 Andy Memorial Semifinal	Saitama, Japan	Decision (Unanimous)	3	3:00	11-9-1
2001-08-19	Win	(Japan) Great Kusatsu	K-1 Andy Memorial Quarterfinal	Saitama, Japan	Decision (Unanimous)	3	3:00	11-8-1
2001-06-24	Win	(Japan) Shingo Koyasu	K-1 Survival 2001	Sendai, Japan	Decision (Unanimous)	3	3:00	10-8-1
2001-03-17	Loss	(Brazil) Glaube Feitosa	K-1 Gladiators 2001	Yokohama, Japan	KO (Left high kick)	2	0:57	9-8-1
2001-01-30	Loss	(Japan) Toru Oishi	K-1 Rising 2001	Shikoku, Japan	Decision (Majority)	5	3:00	9-7-1
2000-08-20	Loss	(Brazil) Francisco Filho	K-1 World Grand Prix 2000 in Yokohama Quarterfinal	Yokohama, Japan	Decision (Unanimous)	3	3:00	9-6-1
2000-07-07	Loss	(China) An Hu	K-1 Spirits 2000 Quarterfinal	Sendai, Japan	TKO (Stoppage/Punches)	3	0:45	9-5-1
2000-05-28	Win	(Japan) Noboru Uchida	K-1 Survival 2000	Sapporo, Japan	Decision (Unanimous)	3	3:00	9-4-1
2000-03-19	Draw	(Australia) Stan Longinidis	K-1 Burning 2000	Yokohama, Japan	Decision draw (1-0)	5	3:00	8-4-1
2000-01-25	Win	Marten Simons	K-1 Rising 2000	Nagasaki, Japan	Decision (Unanimous)	3	3:00	8-4-0
1999-08-22	Loss	(Japan) Nobu Hayashi	K-1 Spirits '99 Semifinal	Tokyo, Japan	Decision (Majority)	3	3:00	7-4-0
1999-08-22	Win	(Japan) Toru Oishi	K-1 Spirits '99 Quarterfinal	Tokyo, Japan	Decision (Majority)		3:00	7-3-0
1999-08-22	Win	(Japan) Yasuhiro Anbe	K-1 Spirits '99 Eighth-final	Tokyo, Japan	2nd Ext.R Decision (Unanimous)	5	3:00	6-3-0
1999-07-18	Win	(Sweden) Tofan Pirani	K-1 Dream '99	Nagoya, Japan	KO (Right hook)	1	0:15	5-3-0
1999-03-22	Win	(United States) Dewey Cooper	K-1 The Challenge '99	Tokyo, Japan	KO (Right high kick)	2	2:44	4-3-0
1999-02-03	Loss	(Switzerland) Andy Hug	K-1 Rising Sun '99	Tokyo, Japan	KO (Right spinning heel kick)	2	0:22	3-3-0
1998-10-28	Loss	(Australia) Stan Longinidis	K-1 Japan '98 Kamikaze	Tokyo, Japan	TKO (Doctor stoppage)	4	0:30	3-2-0
The fight was stopped after Naksako suffered a broken nose.
1998-08-28	Loss	(Japan) Masaaki Satake	K-1 Japan Grand Prix '98 Final	Tokyo, Japan	Decision (Majority)	3	3:00	3-1-0
Fight was for the for K-1 Japan Grand Prix '98 title.
1998-08-28	Win	(Japan) Ryo Takigawa	K-1 Japan Grand Prix '98 Semifinal	Tokyo, Japan	KO	1	0:56	3-0-0
1998-08-28	Win	(Japan) Mitsuya Nagai	K-1 Japan Grand Prix '98 Quarterfinal	Tokyo, Japan	TKO (Left high kick)	2	2:55	2-0-0
1998-05-24	Win	(Canada) Pierre Guenette	K-1 Braves '98	Fukuoka, Japan	TKO (Punch)	2	2:14	1-0-0
Legend: Win Loss Draw/No contest Notes

== See also ==
- List of male kickboxers
- List of K-1 Events
