= Glaube Feitosa =

Brazilian martial artist (born 1973)

- Born: Glaube Araújo Feitosa; April 9, 1973 (age 53); São Paulo, Brazil
- Other names: Brazilian Warrior
- Height: 1.93 m (6 ft 4 in)
- Weight: 106 kg (234 lb; 16.7 st)
- Division: Heavyweight
- Style: Kyokushin Karate
- Fighting out of: Tokyo, Japan
- Team: Team Ichigeki
- Trainer: Jayson Vemoa; Fai Falamoe; Mauricio "Baboo" Da Silva
- Years active: 12 (1998–2010)

Kickboxing record
- Total: 35
- Wins: 17
- By knockout: 11
- Losses: 17
- By knockout: 6
- Draws: 1
- Last updated on: September 26, 2009

Glaube Araújo Feitosa (born April 9, 1973) is a Brazilian former kickboxer and a kyokushin full contact karate practitioner who was competing in K-1. In 2005, Feitosa won K-1 World Grand Prix 2005 in Las Vegas tournament and was a K-1 World Grand Prix 2005 finalist. He has gone the distance with some of the top fighters in his time, such as Peter Aerts, Remy Bonjasky, Semmy Schilt and Errol Zimmerman. An accomplished karate fighter, he was known for his use of the "question mark kick," utilizing the technique in several knockout victories in his career. Feitosa also holds wins over Cheick Kongo, Alistair Overeem, Ruslan Karaev, and Paul Slowinski.

== Biography and career ==
A native of Brazil, Feitosa began training in Kyokushin Karate from a young age, and fought in several world championship tournaments. While living in Tokyo, Japan he fought and trained in the IKO1 Kyokushin - Team Ichigeki at the Ichigeki Plaza.

Feitosa achieved several notable results during his karate career. In 1995, he finished eighth at the 6th Kyokushin World Open Tournament Championship, followed by a fourth-place finish at the 7th Kyokushin World Open Tournament Championship in 1999. In 1996 and 1997, he won the All Brazil Karate-do Championship, while in 1997 he also became All South American Karate-do Champion and won the America's Cup Karate-do Championship. That year, he finished as runner-up in the All World Karate-do Championship in the heavyweight division. In 2003, Feitosa placed fourth at the 8th Kyokushin World Open Tournament Championship.

On April 30, 2005, Feitosa won the K-1 World Grand Prix 2005 in Las Vegas tournament with a unanimous decision over Dewey Cooper and two knockouts over Carter Williams and Gary Goodridge. In the same year he fought for the K-1 World Grand Prix 2005 title and lost by decision to Semmy Schilt.

As a reserve fighter Glaube beat Goodridge by unanimous decision and advanced to the semi-finals after Peter Aerts had to pull out due to a rib fracture, where he knocked out Musashi with a flying knee to get to the finals where he rematched Semmy Schilt. Glaube lost the fight by a first-round KO after a knee to the head.

As a WGP runner up he fought at the 2006 eliminations, beating Paul Slowinski by unanimous decision. He knocked out Ruslan Karaev in the first round and advanced to the semi-finals, losing by TKO in the second round to Peter Aerts.

On September 29, 2007 Feitosa met German kickboxer Chalid Arrab at the K-1 World GP 2007 in Seoul Final 16. He won the fight by unanimous decision and qualified himself for K-1 World GP 2007 Final held on December 8, 2007 at the Yokohama Arena, Japan.

Feitosa met two-time defending champion Semmy Schilt. Glaube lost a unanimous decision to Semmy for the third time.

After knocking out Alex Roberts in March 2008, Glaube fought for the new Heavyweight title against Badr Hari at the K-1 World GP 2008 in Fukuoka. Glaube was knocked out in the first round.

At the K-1 World GP 2008 Final 16 Glaube fought the 2008 Amsterdam Champion, Errol Zimmerman. Glaube lost a unanimous decision after being battered by the heavy hands of his opponent over three rounds.

In 2009 Glaube knocked out Junichi Sawayashiki and was voted in by the fans to fight at the K-1 World Grand Prix 2009 Final 16, in a rematch against Errol Zimmerman. Zimmerman won by decision. Glaube has most recently been recruited by Maurico Shogun Rua to help him prepare for his upcoming fight with Lyoto Machida.

== Titles ==
- K-1 World Grand Prix 2009 - Final 8
- K-1 World Grand Prix 2008 - Final 8
- K-1 World Grand Prix 2007 - Final 8
- K-1 World Grand Prix 2006 - Final 8 (3rd place)
- K-1 World Grand Prix 2005 - Final 8 (2nd place)
- 2005 K-1 World Grand Prix runner-up
- 2005 K-1 World Grand Prix in Las Vegas Champion
- 2005 MVP in Kyokushin Karate World Cup in Paris
- 2003 No.4 in 8th Kyokushin World Open Tournament Championship
- 1999 No.4 in 7th Kyokushin World Open Tournament Championship
- 1997 2nd Place in All World Karate-do Championship-Heavyweight
- 1997 America's Cup Karate-do Champion
- 1997 All South American Karate-do Champion
- 1997 All Brazil Karate-do Champion
- 1996 All Brazil Karate-do Champion
- 1995 No.8 in 6th Kyokushin World Open Tournament Championship

== Kickboxing record ==
Kickboxing record
17 wins (11 (T)KOs, 6 decisions), 17 losses, 1 draw
Date	Result	Opponent	Event	Location	Method	Round	Time	Record
2009-09-26	Loss	(Curaçao) Errol Zimmerman	K-1 World Grand Prix 2009 Final 16	Seoul, Korea	Decision (majority)	3	3:00	17-17-1
2009-03-28	Win	(Japan) Junichi Sawayashiki	K-1 World Grand Prix 2009 in Yokohama	Yokohama, Japan	KO (left straight punch)	2	0:48	17-16-1
2008-09-27	Loss	(Curaçao) Errol Zimmerman	K-1 World Grand Prix 2008 in Seoul Final 16	Seoul, Korea	Decision (unanimous)	3	3:00	16-16-1
2008-06-29	Loss	(Morocco) Badr Hari	K-1 World GP 2008 in Fukuoka	Fukuoka, Japan	KO (right hook)	1	2:26	16-15-1
Fight was for K-1 Heavyweight (-100kg) title.
2008-04-13	Win	(United States) Alex Roberts	K-1 World GP 2008 in Yokohama	Yokohama, Japan	KO (left high kick)	2	1:58	16-14-1
2007-12-08	Loss	(Netherlands) Semmy Schilt	K-1 World Grand Prix 2007 Final	Tokyo, Japan	Decision (unanimous)	3	3:00	15-14-1
2007-09-29	Win	(Germany) Chalid Arrab	K-1 World GP 2007 in Seoul Final 16	Seoul, Korea	Decision (unanimous)	3	3:00	15-13-1
2007-04-28	Loss	(Netherlands) Remy Bonjasky	K-1 World Grand Prix 2007 in Hawaii	Honolulu, Hawaii	Decision (majority)	3	3:00	14-13-1
2006-12-02	Loss	(Netherlands) Peter Aerts	K-1 World Grand Prix 2006, Semi-final	Tokyo, Japan	TKO (referee stoppage)	2	1:02	14-12-1
2006-12-02	Win	(Russia) Ruslan Karaev	K-1 World Grand Prix 2006 Quarter-final	Tokyo, Japan	KO (left high kick)	1	1:11	14-11-1
2006-09-30	Win	(Poland) Paul Slowinski	K-1 World Grand Prix 2006 in Osaka opening round	Osaka, Japan	Decision (unanimous)	3	3:00	13-11-1
2006-07-30	Win	(Japan) Musashi	K-1 World Grand Prix 2006 in Sapporo	Sapporo, Japan	Decision (unanimous)	3	3:00	12-11-1
2005-11-19	Loss	(Netherlands) Semmy Schilt	K-1 World Grand Prix 2005 Final	Tokyo, Japan	KO (knee strike)	1	0:48	11-11-1
Fight was for K-1 World Grand Prix 2005 title.
2005-11-19	Win	(Japan) Musashi	K-1 World Grand Prix 2005 Semi-final	Tokyo, Japan	KO (jumping knee)	2	1:05	11-10-1
2005-11-19	Win	(Trinidad and Tobago) Gary Goodridge	K-1 World Grand Prix 2005 Reserve Fight	Tokyo, Japan	Decision (unanimous)	3	3:00	10-10-1
2005-09-23	Loss	(Netherlands) Semmy Schilt	K-1 World Grand Prix 2005 in Osaka – final elimination	Osaka, Japan	Decision (unanimous)	3	3:00	9-10-1
2005-04-30	Win	(Trinidad and Tobago) Gary Goodridge	K-1 World Grand Prix 2005 in Las Vegas Final	Las Vegas, Nevada	KO (left high kick)	1	2:40	9-9-1
Wins K-1 World GP 2005 in Las Vegas title.
2005-04-30	Win	(United States) Carter Williams	K-1 World Grand Prix 2005 in Las Vegas Semi-final	Las Vegas, Nevada	TKO (ref stop/three knockdowns)	2	2:56	8-9-1
2005-04-30	Win	(United States) Dewey Cooper	K-1 World Grand Prix 2005 in Las Vegas Quarter-final	Las Vegas, Nevada	Decision (unanimous)	3	3:00	7-9-1
2005-03-19	Win	(France) Cheick Kongo	Ichigeki Paris 2005	Paris, France	Decision (unanimous)	3	3:00	6-9-1
2004-09-25	Loss	(Netherlands) Ernesto Hoost	K-1 World Grand Prix 2004 final elimination	Osaka, Japan	Decision (unanimous)	3	3:00	5-9-1
2004-07-17	Win	(New Zealand) Toa	K-1 World Grand Prix 2004 in Seoul	Seoul, Korea	KO (left high kick)	1	1:49	5-8-1
2004-05-30	Win	(Netherlands) Alistair Overeem	Kyokushin vs K-1 2004 All Out Battle	Tokyo, Japan	KO (left hook)	1	2:13	4-8-1
2003-02-22	Win	(Czech Republic) Pavel Majer	Ichigeki 2003 Japan	Japan	KO	3		3-8-1
2002-10-05	Loss	(Netherlands) Peter Aerts	K-1 World Grand Prix 2002 final elimination	Osaka, Japan	Decision (unanimous)	3	3:00	2-8-1
2002-07-14	Loss	(Sweden) Martin Holm	K-1 World Grand Prix 2002 in Fukuoka	Fukuoka, Japan	KO (punch)	1	2:20	2-7-1
2002-03-03	Draw	(Japan) Musashi	K-1 World Grand Prix 2002 in Nagoya	Nagoya, Japan	Decision draw	5	3:00	2-6-1
2001-10-08	Loss	(Canada) Michael McDonald	K-1 World Grand Prix 2001 in Fukuoka	Fukuoka, Japan	Decision (unanimous)	3	3:00	2-6
2001-03-17	Win	(Japan) Tsuyoshi Nakasako	K-1 Gladiators 2001	Yokohama, Japan	KO (left high kick)	2	0:57	2-5
2000-10-09	Loss	(Croatia) Mirko Cro Cop	K-1 World Grand Prix 2000 in Fukuoka	Fukuoka, Japan	Decision (unanimous)	3	3:00	1-5
2000-08-05	Loss	(Canada) Tomasz Kucharzewski	K-1 USA Championships 2000 semi final	Las Vegas, Nevada	TKO	1	2:03	1-4
2000-08-05	Win	(United States) George Randolph	K-1 USA Championships 2000 quarter final	Las Vegas, Nevada	KO (punch)	1	1:07	1-3
2000-04-23	Loss	(Switzerland) Andy Hug	K-1 The Millennium	Osaka, Japan	Decision (unanimous)	5	3:00	0-3
1998-09-27	Loss	(Japan) Masaaki Satake	K-1 World Grand Prix '98 opening round	Osaka, Japan	Decision (majority)	5	3:00	0-2
1998-07-18	Loss	(South Africa) Mike Bernardo	K-1 Dream '98	Nagoya, Japan	TKO	1	1:42	0-1
Legend: Win Loss Draw/no contest Notes

== See also ==
- List of K-1 events
- List of K-1 champions
- List of male kickboxers
