= Dewey Cooper =

American kickboxer and boxer (born 1974)

- Born: November 10, 1974 (age 51); Los Angeles, California, U.S.
- Other names: Black Kobra
- Height: 1.83 m (6 ft 0 in)
- Weight: 100 kg (220 lb; 16 st)
- Division: Cruiserweight; Heavyweight
- Style: Kickboxing, Muay Thai, boxing
- Stance: Southpaw
- Fighting out of: Las Vegas, Nevada, United States
- Team: One Kick's Gym
- Trainer: Nick "One Kick" Blomgren
- Years active: 1994–2014

Professional boxing record
- Total: 25
- Wins: 19
- By knockout: 11
- Losses: 3
- Draws: 3

Kickboxing record
- Total: 67
- Wins: 49
- By knockout: 28
- Losses: 15
- By knockout: 1
- Draws: 3

Mixed martial arts record
- Total: 3
- Wins: 2
- By decision: 2
- Losses: 1
- By decision: 1

Other information
- Notable students: John Alessio; Kevin Lee; Jessica Rakoczy; Beibut Shumenov; Francis Ngannou; Farid Basharat; Javid Basharat
- Last updated on: May 29, 2014

Dewey Cooper (born November 10, 1974) is an American former kickboxer and boxer who competed in the cruiserweight and heavyweight divisions. After becoming a two-time world champion in 2000 by taking the WKC heavyweight and WKF cruiserweight titles, he would go on to become a regular competitor in the K-1 promotion's US events. He came close to winning a K-1 Grand Prix Tournament when he defeated Nobu Hayashi and Samoan power puncher Mighty Mo, but lost out to Michael McDonald in the final of the K-1 World Grand Prix 2004 in Las Vegas I all in the same night.

== Career ==
Born in Los Angeles, California, Cooper started practicing Muay Thai as a youngster and began training under Nick "One Kick" Blomgren at One Kick's Gym in Las Vegas, Nevada in 1994.

After making a name for himself on the American circuit by racking up a record of 15-2 (10 KOs), winning the USMTF and UKC national titles in the process, his services were recruited by K-1, the world's premier kickboxing organization. Debuting on January 22, 1999 at K-1 The Challenge '99 in Tokyo, Japan, Cooper was knocked out in the second round by Tsuyoshi Nakasako. Despite this setback, he went on to have a break-out year in 2000 when he won the WKC World Heavyweight Championship and WKF World Cruiserweight Championship. He also faced the legendary and recently un-retired Don "The Dragon" Wilson for the ISKA North American Cruiserweight (-88.2 kg/194.4 lb) Full Contact Championship at the MGM Grand Las Vegas on March 17, 2000, losing out via majority decision after ten rounds.

Returning to K-1 at the K-1 USA Championships 2000 on August 5, 2000, Cooper dropped a razor-thin split decision to Giuseppe De Natale after two extension rounds. 2001 fared better for Cooper, as he defeated Arne Soldwedel by unanimous decision at the K-1 World Grand Prix 2001 Preliminary USA in May and Mark Miller by technical knockout at the K-1 World Grand Prix 2001 in Las Vegas in August. These wins earned him a place among North America's eight best heavyweights in the K-1 World Grand Prix 2002 Preliminary USA tournament held on May 3, 2002 in Las Vegas. Cooper was drawn against Jean-Claude Leuyer at the quarter-final stage and floored the four-time world champion in the third round en route to a unanimous decision. In the semi-finals, he came up against one of the United States' most accomplished kickboxers in Rick Roufus. Roufus attacked Cooper's lead leg, which was already battered from the Leuyer fight, with low kicks from the first bell, taking away his mobility and offence. Roufus took the judges decision after three rounds.

Cooper was invited back to the Las Vegas Grand Prix the following year, going up against Japanese representative Yusuke Fujimoto in the opening round of the K-1 World Grand Prix 2003 in Las Vegas on May 2, 2003. He dropped Fujimoto with a left hook in the first round, but took a beating from his opponent's kicks in rounds two and three and lost via unanimous decision and was eliminated from the tournament. In his next outing in the promotion, Cooper went up against the reigning K-1 Las Vegas champion Carter Williams in a non-tournament match at the K-1 World Grand Prix 2003 in Las Vegas II on August 15, 2003. Cooper fought well, constantly moving while scoring on the larger Williams, who landed the harder shots. The crowd voiced its disapproval when Williams was announced as the winner on the judges' scorecards (30–27, 30–28, and 29.5–29).

Following a unanimous decision loss at the hands of Vitali Akhramenko at K-1 Final Fight Stars War in Zagreb on October 31, 2003, he competed in his third K-1 tournament, the K-1 World Grand Prix 2004 in Las Vegas I, on April 30, 2004. He was able to beat Seido karate stylist Nobu Hayashi by unanimous decision in the quarter-finals by staying the more active of the two. Then, in the semis, he became the first man to defeat Samoan knockout artist Mighty Mo. Despite giving up 37 kg/82 lb in weight to his opponent, Cooper used superior ring skills and took a unanimous decision (30–28.5, 29.5–29, and 29.5–29) after three rounds. He would then go up against Michael McDonald, a two-time K-1 USA tournament winner, in the final. McDonald outpointed Cooper on all three judges' scorecards (29–28, 30–28, and 30–27.5) to win his third North American Grand Prix.

Despite coming so close to claiming a K-1 tournament title, Cooper would not win another bout in the promotion. A split decision loss to Trinidadian brawler Gary Goodridge on August 7, 2004 at the K-1 World Grand Prix 2004 in Las Vegas II was followed up with two consecutive quarter-final defeats in the next two tournaments he entered; Kyokushin fighter Glaube Feitosa beat him at the April 30, 2005 K-1 World Grand Prix 2005 in Las Vegas and Scott Lighty outpointed him at the K-1 World Grand Prix 2006 in Las Vegas a year later. In what would be his last K-1 bout for six years, Cooper dropped a unanimous decision to Ruslan Karaev at the K-1 World Grand Prix 2006 in Las Vegas II on August 5, 2006.

2006 saw Cooper return to his career in professional boxing, in which he had notched up an undefeated record between 2001 and 2004. Despite tasting defeat in 2007 at the hands of Mike Alderete, who he would later defeat in a rematch, Cooper's boxing career culminated in a duo of fights with Arthur Williams for the WBC United States Cruiserweight (-90.7 kg/200 lb) Championship. In his first fight with Williams, which took place in Lemoore, California on October 23, 2008, the match was stopped in the fifth of a scheduled ten rounds due to an accidental headbutt which caused a large gash on Williams’ forehead and Williams was named the winner on a technical decision. In their rematch on February 6, 2009 in the same city, Williams again walked away with the victory, a unanimous decision after the full ten rounds.

On July 17, 2009, Cooper competed at Kung Fu King 2009, an eight-man sanshou tournament in Guangzhou, China featuring such notables as Kaoklai Kaennorsing, Steve McKinnon and Muslim Salikhov. He was eliminated at the quarter-final stage after losing a decision to Yu Jin.

He made a return to K-1 in 2012 at thirty-seven years of age, headlining the card at the K-1 World Grand Prix 2012 in Los Angeles on September 8, 2012 against promotional newcomer Randy Blake with a place at the 2012 K-1 World Grand Prix at stake. Despite outweighing his opponent for the first time in his K-1 career, Cooper was unable to defeat the younger Blake and lost via unanimous decision after three rounds.

Cooper was initially set to fight Fred Sikking for the vacant WPMF World Heavyweight (-95.454 kg/210.4 lb) Championship at Muaythai Superfight in Pattaya, Thailand on May 13, 2013. The event was pushed back to June 14, 2013, however, and he lost by unanimous decision.

Cooper fought to a draw in a clinch-heavy affair with Peter Aerts at GFC Series 1 in Dubai, United Arab Emirates on May 29, 2014.

Also a trainer, Cooper's students include Daniel Strauss, Sanjar Rakhmanov, Roy Nelson, John Alessio, Kevin Lee, Jessica Rakoczy, Jessie Vargas, Beibut Shumenov, Francis Ngannou, Makhmud Muradov.

== Championships and awards ==
=== Kickboxing ===
- K-1
  - K-1 World Grand Prix 2004 in Las Vegas I Runner-up
  - K-1 World Grand Prix 2002 Preliminary USA semifinalist
- United States Muay Thai Federation
  - USMTF United States Championship
- Universal Kickboxing Council
  - UKC United States Championship
- World Kickboxing Council
  - WKC World Heavyweight Championship
- World Kickboxing Federation
  - WKF World Cruiserweight Championship
- Inducted in 2008 Martial Arts Hall of Fame
- United States Muay Thai Association, Official Member 2016 Certified Arjarn (Master) Instructor Certificate Award. Registered Member USMTA 01990010170592US

== Boxing record ==
Key to abbreviations used for results
DQ	Disqualification	RTD	Corner retirement
KO	Knockout	SD	Split decision / split draw
MD	Majority decision / majority draw	TD	Technical decision / technical draw
NC	No contest	TKO	Technical knockout
PTS	Points decision	UD	Unanimous decision / unanimous draw

Boxing record
No.	Result	Record	Opponent	Type	Round(s)	Time	Date	Location	Notes
19 wins (11 (T)KO's, 8 decisions), 3 losses (3 decisions), 3 draws
1	Win	19–3–3	(United States) Donnie Davis	TKO	2	1:48	2012-03-31	4 Bears Casino & Lodge, New Town, North Dakota, US	
2	Win	18–3–3	(United States) Cory Phelps	UD	8	3:00	2009-07-03	Plaza Hotel & Casino, Las Vegas, Nevada, US	
3	Loss	17–3–3	(United States) Arthur Williams	MD	10	3:00	2009-02-06	Tachi Palace, Lemoore, California, US	(Note: For the WBC United States Cruiserweight (-90.7 kg/200 lb) Championship.)
4	Loss	17–2–3	(United States) Arthur Williams	TD	5	3:00	2008-10-23	Tachi Palace, Lemoore, California, US	
5	Win	17–1–3	(United States) Galen Brown	UD	10	3:00	2008-08-21	Tachi Palace, Lemoore, California, US	
6	Draw	16–1–3	(United States) Terrance Smith	PTS	6	3:00	2008-06-26	Tachi Palace, Lemoore, California, US	
7	Win	16–1–2	(United States) Mike Alderete	UD	8	3:00	2008-04-17	Tachi Palace, Lemoore, California, US	
8	Loss	15–1–2	(United States) Mike Alderete	MD	6	3:00	2007-12-06	Tachi Palace, Lemoore, California, US	
9	Win	15–0–2	(United States) Salah Zabian	TKO	4	2:13	2006-11-16	Hard Rock Hotel and Casino, Las Vegas, Nevada, US	
10	Win	14–0–2	(United States) Cullen Rogers	UD	6	3:00	2006-03-31	Edgewater Hotel and Casino, Laughlin, Nevada, US	
11	Win	13–0–2	(United States) Jason Curry	TKO	2	1:41	2004-11-26	Plaza Hotel & Casino, Las Vegas, Nevada, US	
12	Win	12–0–2	(United States) Salah Zabian	UD	6	3:00	2004-10-29	The Orleans, Las Vegas, Nevada, US	
13	Win	11–0–2	(United States) Carl Gathright	TKO	1	2:58	2004-10-01	Gold Coast Hotel and Casino, Las Vegas, Nevada, US	
14	Win	10–0–2	(United States) Rodney Moore	MD	6	3:00	2004-01-30	The Orleans, Las Vegas, Nevada, US	
15	Win	9–0–2	(United States) Caesar Carbajal	TKO	5	1:14	2003-10-17	The Orleans, Las Vegas, Nevada, US	
16	Win	8–0–2	(United States) Jeff Bigger	TKO	1	2:10	2003-08-01	The Orleans, Las Vegas, Nevada, US	
17	Win	7–0–2	(United States) Robert Green	MD	6	3:00	2003-02-28	The Orleans, Las Vegas, Nevada, US	
18	Win	6–0–2	(United States) Jeff Lindsey	KO	1	0:36	2002-12-27	The Orleans, Las Vegas, Nevada, US	
19	Win	5–0–2	(United States) Raul Rene Fuentes	TKO	2	1:13	2002-11-08	Stratosphere Las Vegas, Las Vegas, Nevada, US	
20	Win	4–0–2	(United States) Raul Rene Fuentes	TKO	4	1:58	2002-08-17	The Aladdin, Las Vegas, Nevada, US	
21	Draw	3–0–2	(United States) Robert Green	PTS	4	3:00	2002-07-13	The Aladdin, Las Vegas, Nevada, US	
22	Win	3–0–1	(United States) Isaac Broussard	TKO	4	2:51	2002-06-14	The Orleans, Las Vegas, Nevada, US	
23	Draw	2–0–1	(United States) Alex Conte	PTS	4	3:00	2002-02-17	Stardust Resort and Casino, Las Vegas, Nevada, US	
24	Win	2–0	(United States) Isaac Broussard	MD	4	3:00	2002-01-13	The Venetian Las Vegas, Las Vegas, Nevada, US	
25	Win	1–0	(United States) Doe Extee	TKO	2	0:50	2001-10-19	The Orleans, Las Vegas, Nevada, US	

== Kickboxing record (incomplete) ==
Kickboxing record (incomplete)
49 wins (28 (T)KOs), 17 losses (1 (T)KO, 16 decisions), 3 draws
Date	Result	Opponent	Event	Location	Method	Round	Time
2014-05-29	Draw	(Netherlands) Peter Aerts	GFC Fight Series 1	Dubai, UAE	Draw	3	3:00
2013-05-13	Loss	(Netherlands) Fred Sikking	Muaythai Superfight	Pattaya, Thailand	Decision (unanimous)	5	3:00
For the WPMF World Heavyweight (-95.454 kg/210.4 lb) Championship.
2012-09-08	Loss	(United States) Randy Blake	K-1 World Grand Prix 2012 in Los Angeles	Los Angeles, California, US	Decision (unanimous)	3	3:00
2011-11-27	Loss	(China) Qiang Guo	WCK Muay Thai: USA vs. China	Las Vegas, Nevada, US	Decision (unanimous)	5	3:00
2009-07-17	Loss	(China) Yu Jin	Kung Fu King 2009, Quarter Finals	Guangzhou, China	Decision	5	3:00
2006-08-12	Loss	(Russia) Ruslan Karaev	K-1 World Grand Prix 2006 in Las Vegas II	Las Vegas, Nevada, US	Decision (unanimous)	3	3:00
2006-04-29	Loss	(United States) Scott Lighty	K-1 World Grand Prix 2006 in Las Vegas, Quarter Finals	Las Vegas, Nevada, US	Decision (unanimous)	3	3:00
2005-04-30	Loss	(Brazil) Glaube Feitosa	K-1 World Grand Prix 2005 in Las Vegas, Quarter Finals	Las Vegas, Nevada, US	Decision (unanimous)	3	3:00
2004-08-07	Loss	(Trinidad and Tobago) Gary Goodridge	K-1 World Grand Prix 2004 in Las Vegas II	Las Vegas, Nevada, US	Decision (split)	3	3:00
2004-04-30	Loss	(Canada) Michael McDonald	K-1 World Grand Prix 2004 in Las Vegas I, Final	Las Vegas, Nevada, US	Decision (unanimous)	3	3:00
For the K-1 World Grand Prix 2004 in Las Vegas I Championship.
2004-04-30	Win	(United States) Mighty Mo	K-1 World Grand Prix 2004 in Las Vegas I, Semi Finals	Las Vegas, Nevada, US	Decision (unanimous)	3	3:00
2004-04-30	Win	(Japan) Nobu Hayashi	K-1 World Grand Prix 2004 in Las Vegas I, Quarter Finals	Las Vegas, Nevada, US	Decision (unanimous)	3	3:00
2003-10-31	Loss	(Belarus) Vitali Akhramenko	K-1 Final Fight Stars War in Zagreb	Zagreb, Croatia	Decision (unanimous)	5	3:00
2003-08-15	Loss	(United States) Carter Williams	K-1 World Grand Prix 2003 in Las Vegas II	Las Vegas, Nevada, US	Decision (unanimous)	3	3:00
2003-05-02	Loss	(Japan) Yusuke Fujimoto	K-1 World Grand Prix 2003 in Las Vegas, Quarter Finals	Las Vegas, Nevada, US	Decision (unanimous)	3	3:00
2002-05-03	Loss	(United States) Rick Roufus	K-1 World Grand Prix 2002 Preliminary USA, Semi Finals	Las Vegas, Nevada, US	Decision (unanimous)	3	3:00
2002-05-03	Win	(United States) Jean-Claude Leuyer	K-1 World Grand Prix 2002 Preliminary USA, Quarter Finals	Las Vegas, Nevada, US	Decision (unanimous)	3	3:00
2001-08-11	Win	(United States) Mark Miller	K-1 World Grand Prix 2001 in Las Vegas	Las Vegas, Nevada, US	TKO	2	N/A
2001-05-05	Win	(United States) Arne Soldwedel	K-1 World Grand Prix 2001 Preliminary USA	Las Vegas, Nevada, US	Decision (unanimous)	3	3:00
2000-08-05	Loss	(Canada) Giuseppe De Natale	K-1 USA Championships 2000	Las Vegas, Nevada, US	Extra round decision (split)	5	3:00
2000-07-08	Win	(United States) Marcio Castillo	ISKA Kickboxing	Las Vegas, Nevada, US	TKO	1	2:33
2000-03-17	Loss	(United States) Don Wilson	N/A	Las Vegas, Nevada, US	Decision (majority)	10	2:00
For the ISKA North American Cruiserweight (-88.2 kg/194.4 lb) Full Contact Championship.
1999-10-23	Loss	(United States) Jeff Roufus	N/A	Milwaukee, Wisconsin, US	Decision	5	3:00
1999-03-22	Loss	(Japan) Tsuyoshi Nakasako	K-1 The Challenge '99	Tokyo, Japan	KO (right high kick)	2	2:44
Legend: Win Loss Draw/no contest Notes

== Mixed martial arts record ==
Professional record breakdown
3 matches	2 wins	1 loss
By decision	2	1

Res.	Record	Opponent	Method	Event	Date	Round	Time	Location	Notes
Loss	2–1	Jimmy Dexter	Decision (unanimous)	PFC 4: Project Complete	October 18, 2007	3	3:00	Lemoore, California, United States	
Win	2–0	Adam Smith	Decision (unanimous)	Strikeforce: Playboy Mansion	September 29, 2007	3	3:00	Los Angeles, California, United States	Catchweight (210 lb) bout.
Win	1–0	Adam Smith	Decision (unanimous)	PFC 3: Step Up	July 19, 2007	3	3:00	Lemoore, California, United States	
