= Park Yong-soo =

South Korean taekwondo practitioner and kickboxer

Yong-soo Park
- Born: 1981 (age 44–45); South Korea
- Height: 198 cm (6 ft 6 in)
- Weight: 105 kg (231 lb; 16 st 7 lb)
- Division: Heavyweight
- Reach: 75 in (191 cm)
- Style: Taekwondo, Kickboxing
- Fighting out of: Seoul, South Korea

Kickboxing record
- Total: 13
- Wins: 4
- By knockout: 3
- Losses: 9
- By knockout: 8
- Last updated on: January 20, 2020

Yong-soo Park (born 1981) is a South Korean taekwondo practitioner and heavyweight kickboxer who has fought professionally in K-1.

His most notable opponents include Kaoklai Kaennorsing, Musashi, and Jerome Le Banner.

== Career ==
In December 2012, Park signed with the Glory promotion.

He was scheduled to fight Singh Jaideep at Glory 5: London on March 23, 2013 in London, England but was replaced by Daniel Sam.

Park made his Glory debut at Glory 20: Dubai on April 3, 2015, facing Chi Lewis-Parry. He was knocked out just 25 seconds into the first round.

== Kickboxing record ==
Kickboxing record
4 wins (4 KOs), 9 losses, 0 draws
Date	Result	Opponent	Event	Location	Method	Round	Time
2015-04-03	Loss	(United Kingdom) Chi Lewis-Parry	Glory 20: Dubai	Dubai, UAE	KO	1	0:25
2013-02-02	Loss	(China) Yin Pengsen	The Khan vs. Wulinfeng	Seoul, Republic of Korea	TKO (Referee-Stoppage)	3	2:38
2012-01-15	Win	(South Korea) Yoo Yang-rae	The Khan 3	Republic of Korea	KO	1	0:42
2009-08-02	Loss	(India) Singh Jaideep	K-1 World Grand Prix 2009 in Seoul	Seoul, Republic of Korea	KO (Right hook)	2	1:35
2009-05-23	Loss	(Poland) Martin Rozalski	K-1 World Grand Prix 2009 in Lodz	Lodz, Poland	KO	3	0:32
2008-09-27	Loss	(South Korea) Randy Kim	K-1 World Grand Prix 2008 Final Elimination	Seoul, Republic of Korea	KO	2	1:11
2008-07-13	Loss	(Japan) Makoto Uehara	K-1 World Grand Prix 2008 in Taipei	Taipei, Taiwan	KO (Left Hook)	Ex. R	1:26
2007-09-29	Loss	(France) Jerome Le Banner	K-1 World GP 2007 in Seoul Final 16	Seoul, Korea	KO (Right punch)	1	0:54
2007-08-05	Loss	(Japan) Musashi	K-1 World Grand Prix 2007 in Hong Kong Quarter Finals	Hong Kong	KO (Left Hook)	2	0:48
2007-02-18	Loss	(Thailand) Kaoklai Kaennorsing	K-1 Fighting Network KHAN 2007 in Seoul	Seoul, South Korea	Decision (Unanimous)	4(Ex.1)	3:00
2006-10-14	Win	(South Africa) Paul Lungruff	K-1 Rules African Bomba-Yaa	Johannesburg, South Africa	Decision	3	3:00
2006-09-16	Win	(Japan) Daisuke Watanabe	K-1 Khan 2006 in Seoul	Seoul, South Korea	KO (Left High Kick)	1	1:16
2006-06-03	Win	(Japan) Rikijyo	K-1 World Grand Prix 2006 in Seoul	Seoul, South Korea	KO	1	2:21
Legend: Win Loss Draw/No contest Notes
