= Mark Selbee =

- Born: Mark Allen Selbee; March 2, 1969; Topeka, Kansas, United States
- Died: May 24, 2014 (aged 45); Miami County, Kansas, United States; Drowned to Death
- Other names: The Hammer
- Nationality: American
- Height: 6 ft 5 in (1.96 m)
- Weight: 224 lb (102 kg; 16.0 st)
- Division: Heavyweight
- Style: Traditional Tae Kwon Do, Kickboxing
- Rank: Certified Master Instructor at Sun Yi's Academy
- Years active: -2006

Kickboxing record
- Total: 23
- Wins: 22
- By knockout: 12
- Losses: 1
- Draws: 0
- No contests: 0

Mark Allen Selbee (March 2, 1969 – May 24, 2014) was an American kickboxer from Atlanta, Georgia. He began his interests in Martial Arts at Sun Yi's Academy, where he rose up in the ranks to a Certified Master Instructor. He had recently expanded his knowledge of martial arts to include Brazilian jiu jitsu and trained out of Knuckle Up Fitness in Atlanta.

== Career ==
=== Domestic dominance ===
On April 12, 2002, Selbee won the International Kickboxing Federation Amateur Full Contact Rules East Coast U.S. Heavyweight Championship by defeating Adrian Turpin via unanimous decision in Anderson, Georgia, USA. He then turned professional immediately afterwards and automatically gave up this title.

His success continued as a pro on February 1, 2003, when he defeated previous champion Kevin Hudson to win the International Kickboxing Federation Pro Full Contact Rules USA Heavyweight Championship in Atlanta, Georgia by split decision. Judge Ray Thompson scored it 97-89 Selbee, judge Jim Reneau scored it 96-91 Selbee while judge Sean Wohl scored it 95–94, Hudson. Selbee retired this title when he was awarded the North American Heavyweight Title on October 25, 2003, in Dalton, Georgia by forfeit when his scheduled opponent Dan Lucas split open his forehead in a freak accident at his home the day before their scheduled bout..

On his first defence on April 23, 2004, in Atlanta, Selbee defeated John James by TKO when James did not answer the bell after the 5th round due to an injury in his neck suffered in round 4. Selbee again retired his title since he won the International Kickboxing Federation Pro Full Contact Rules Super Heavyweight World Championship on September 11, 2004, in Atlanta. He defeated Raoul Doucet by TKO (three knockdown rule) at 1:09 of round 1 on September 11, 2004. He retired this title in October 2006.

=== K-1 career ===
On April 30, 2005, he made his K-1 debut against Tsuyoshi Nakasako at the K-1 World Grand Prix 2005 in Las Vegas. He won the fight, a tournament Quarter Final bout, via decision after three rounds. However, he was injured during the fight and was forced to withdraw from the tournament and replaced by Scott Lighty.

He returned to K-1 later that year at the K-1 World Grand Prix 2005 in Las Vegas II on August 13 where he tasted defeat for the first time in his career as he was knocked out by Pat Barry in the first round.

== Honors and titles ==
Selbee received several awards of distinction which include, but are not limited to:

- International Kickboxing Federation Amateur Full Contact Rules East Coast U.S. Heavyweight Championship
- International Kickboxing Federation Pro Full Contact Rules USA Heavyweight Championship
- International Kickboxing Federation Pro Full Contact Rules North American Heavyweight Championship
- International Kickboxing Federation Pro Full Contact Rules Super Heavyweight World Championship

== Death ==
Selbee drowned in Hillsdale Lake in Miami County, Kansas while on a boating trip with two of his three children on May 24, 2014. His body was recovered on May 25.
