= Nobu Hayashi =

Japanese kickboxer (born 1978)

- Born: April 27, 1978 (age 48); Tokushima, Japan
- Native name: 林伸樹
- Nationality: (Japan) Japanese
- Height: 1.98 m (6 ft 6 in)
- Weight: 115 kg (254 lb; 18.1 st)
- Division: Heavyweight
- Style: Kickboxing
- Team: Dojo Chakuriki Japan
- Years active: 1999–present

Kickboxing record
- Total: 38
- Wins: 16
- By knockout: 7
- Losses: 19
- By knockout: 8
- Draws: 3
- Last updated on: October 26, 2011

Nobu Hayashi (Japanese: 林伸樹; born April 27, 1978) is a professional Japanese heavyweight karateka and kickboxer. He is a two-time K-1 Japan tournament runner-up and holds notable wins over Ben Edwards, Sander Thonhauser and Faisal Zakaria. Hayashi fights out of Dojo Chakuriki Japan in Tokyo, Japan. Hayashi was diagnosed with leukemia, but was able to recover and is now cancer free.

== Biography and career ==
Nobu Hayashi was born in the Japanese city of Tokushima. He learned karate while attending high school. After his graduation in 1998, Hayashi moved to the Netherlands to train at the world famous Chakuriki Dojo under the guidance of Thom Harinck. He was very committed and eventually debuted, at the age of 19, in the K-1 promotion. Nobu Hayashi won his first three fights at the K-1 Japan Grand Prix (GP) 1999 and reached the tournament finals, but lost the title fight against Musashi. In 2004 he received his Muay Thai teaching diploma from Thom Harinck and opened his own gym, Dojo Chakuriki Japan, in Tokyo. In the same year Hayashi again took the second place in the K-1 Japan GP.

In 2009, Hasyashi checked himself into hospital after he was diagnosed with acute leukemia. He commented: "Just like Chakuri spirit, "going forward, and forward" I am determined to win against this illness, and in my heart I swore I will be back in that ring and fight again, and for now I will dedicate myself to the medical treatment". He was successfully treated in 2010 and continues his kickboxing career as the head of Dojo Chakuriki Japan.

== Titles ==
- 2004 K-1 Japan GP finalist
- 2001 K-1 Japan GP 3rd place
- 1999 K-1 Japan GP finalist
- 1998 Seido Kaikan Rookies 4th place
- 1996 Satojuku Tokyo tournament champion

== Kickboxing record ==
Kickboxing Record
15 Wins (7 KO's, 8 decisions), 19 Losses (8 KO's, 11 decisions), 2 draws
| Date | Result | Opponent | Event | Location | Method | Round | Time | Record |
| 2014-12-29 | Loss | (Netherlands) Murat Aygun | Blade 1 | Tokyo, Japan | KO | | | 15-19-2 |
| 2008-09-15 | Draw | (Japan) Yuuki Niimura | TITANS NEOS IV | Japan | Decision Draw | 3 | 3:00 | 15-18-2 |
| 2008-07-13 | Loss | (Russia) Aleksandr Pitchkounov | K-1 WGP 2008 in Taipei | Japan | Decision (3-0) | Ext. R | 3:00 | 15-18-1 |
| 2008-04-20 | Win | (Australia) Ben Edwards | TITANS NEOS III | Japan | Decision (3-0) | 3 | 3:00 | 15-17-1 |
| 2007-09-16 | Win | (Sudan) Faisal Zakaria | TITANS NEOS II | Japan | Decision (2-0) | 3 | 3:00 | 14-17-1 |
| 2007-05-04 | Loss | (Romania) Daniel Ghiţă | K-1 Fighting Network Romania 2007 | Romania | Decision (3-0) | 3 | 3:00 | 13-17-1 |
| 2005-07-29 | Loss | (United States) Carter Williams | K-1 WGP 2008 in Hawaii | United States | Decision (3-0) | 3 | 3:00 | 13-16-1 |
| 2005-01-23 | Loss | (United States) Ben Rothwell | Shootboxing Ground Zero Fukuoka | Japan | Decision (3-0) | 3 | 3:00 | 13-15-1 |
| 2005-05-27 | Loss | (France) Freddy Kemayo | K-1 WGP 2008 in Paris | France | KO | 1 | 2:36 | 13-14-1 |
| 2004-06-26 | Loss | (Japan) Hiromi Amada | K-1 Beast 2004 | Japan | Decision (3-0) | 3 | 3:00 | 13-13-1 |
| 2004-06-26 | Win | (Japan) Hiraku Hori | K-1 Beast 2004 | Japan | KO | 3 | 2:31 | 13-12-1 |
| 2004-06-26 | Win | (Japan) Tsuyoshi Nakasako | K-1 Beast 2004 | Japan | Decision (3-0) | 3 | 3:00 | 12-12-1 |
| 2004-04-30 | Loss | (United States) Dewey Cooper | K-1 WGP 2004 in Las Vegas | United States | Decision (3-0) | 3 | 3:00 | 11-12-1 |
| 2004-02-15 | Loss | (Czech Republic) Petr Vondracek | K-1 Burning 2004 | Japan | KO | 1 | 2:35 | 11-11-1 |
| 2003-09-21 | Loss | (Japan) Yusuke Fujimoto | K-1 Survival 2003 | Japan | Decision (2-1) | Ext. R | 3:00 | 11-10-1 |
| 2003-06-29 | Win | (Japan) Toru Oishi | K-1 Beast 2003 | Japan | KO | 1 | 1:38 | 11-9-1 |
| 2002-09-22 | Loss | (Japan) Tatsufumi Tomihira | K-1 Andy Spirits 2002 | Japan | Decision (3-0) | Ext. R | 3:00 | 10-9-1 |
| 2002-07-14 | Win | (Japan) Masaaki Miyamoto | K-1 WGP 2003 in Fukuoka | Japan | Decision (3-0) | 3 | 3:00 | 10-8-1 |
| 2002-06-02 | Win | (Japan) Hajime Moriguchi | K-1 Survival 2002 | Japan | Decision (2-0) | 3 | 3:00 | 9-8-1 |
| 2002-02-24 | Loss | (Belarus) Alexey Ignashov | K-1 WGP 2002 Holland Elimination Tournament | Netherlands | Decision (3-0) | 5 | 3:00 | 8-8-1 |
| 2001-08-19 | Loss | (Denmark) Nicholas Pettas | K-1 Andy Memorial 2001 | Japan | KO | 1 | 1:26 | 8-7-1 |
| 2001-08-19 | Win | (Japan) Tatsufumi Tomihira | K-1 Andy Memorial 2001 | Japan | KO | 3 | 2:55 | 8-6-1 |
| 2001-06-24 | Win | (Japan) Tsuyoshi | K-1 Survival 2001 | Japan | Decision (3-0) | 3 | 3:00 | 7-6-1 |
| 2001-04-15 | Loss | (Netherlands) Peter Aerts | K-1 Burning 2001 | Japan | TKO | 5 | 0:36 | 6-6-1 |
| 2001-01-30 | Win | (Japan) Great Kusatsu | K-1 Rising 2001 | Japan | Decision (3-0) | 5 | 3:00 | 6-5-1 |
| 2001-05-20 | Draw | (United Kingdom) John Wyatt | K-1 UK Global Heat | | Decision Draw | 5 | 3:00 | 5-5-1 |
| 2000-10-08 | Win | (Netherlands) Sander Thonhauser | Victory or Hell Part 1 | Netherlands | KO | 2 | | 5-5 |
| 2000-07-07 | Loss | (Switzerland) Andy Hug | K-1 Spirits 2000 | Japan | KO | 1 | 2:05 | 4-5 |
| 2000-05-28 | Loss | (China) Teng Jun | K-1 Burning 2000 | Japan | Decision (3-0) | 2nd Ext. R | 3:00 | 4-4 |
| 2000-03-19 | Loss | (France) Cyril Abidi | K-1 Burning 2000 | Japan | KO | 2 | 1:52 | 4-3 |
| 2000-01-25 | Loss | (Japan) Hiromi Amada | K-1 Rising 2000 | Japan | TKO (Doctor stoppage) | 3 | 0:50 | 4-2 |
| 1999-08-22 | Loss | (Japan) Musashi | K-1 Spirits '99 | Japan | Decision (3-0) | 3 | 3:00 | 4-1 |
| 1999-08-22 | Win | (Japan) Tsuyoshi Nakasako | K-1 Spirits '99 | Japan | Decision (2-0) | 3 | 3:00 | 4-0 |
| 1999-08-22 | Win | (Japan) Issei Nakai | K-1 Spirits '99 | Japan | KO | 1 | 0:51 | 3-0 |
| 1999-08-22 | Win | (Japan) Maasaki Miyamoto | K-1 Spirits '99 | Japan | KO | 1 | 1:48 | 2-0 |
| 1999-03-27 | Win | (Netherlands) Gurhan Degirmenci | The Fights of the Gladiators | Netherlands | Decision (3-0) | 3 | 2:00 | 1-0 |
Legend: Win Loss Draw/No contest Notes

== See also ==
- List of male kickboxers
- List of K-1 Events
