= Sebastian Ciobanu =

Kickboxer from Romania

- Born: Sebastian Ciobanu; March 17, 1985 (age 41); Iași, Romania
- Other names: Son of Dracula
- Nationality: Romanian
- Height: 1.88 m (6 ft 2 in)
- Weight: 98.0 kg (216.1 lb; 15.43 st)
- Division: Heavyweight
- Style: Kickboxing
- Stance: Orthodox
- Team: SC Scorpions Iaşi
- Trainer: Mihai Constantin
- Years active: 6 (2005-present)

Kickboxing record
- Total: 50
- Wins: 28
- By knockout: 4
- Losses: 21
- By knockout: 7
- Draws: 1
- Last updated on: October 16, 2015

Sebastian Ciobanu (born March 17, 1985) is a Romanian Super heavyweight kickboxer fighting in the K-1 and Superkombat.

== Career ==
=== K-1 ===
He made his K-1 debut in 2009 at K-1 World Grand Prix 2009 in Tokyo Final 16 Qualifying GP against Sergei Lascenko.

The biggest performance of his career came in 2010 when he became K-1 World Grand Prix in Bucharest runner-up, in a tournament where he defeated Mighty Mo by KO.

He next faced Dževad Poturak at the SuperKombat World Grand Prix 2012 IV on October 20, 2012 in Arad, Romania and defeated the Bosnian on points to earn himself a wild card spot for the SuperKombat Final Elimination on November 10.

He won a split decision over Roman Kleibl on November 10, 2012 in Craiova, Romania at the SuperKombat World Grand Prix 2012 Final Elimination, which is the quarter-finals of the SuperKombat World Grand Prix 2012.

He rematched Ismael Londt in the semi-finals at the SuperKombat World Grand Prix 2012 Final on December 22, 2012 in Bucharest and lost via technical knockout due to a cut in the second round.

He won the SuperKombat World Grand Prix 10 in Craiova, Romania on May 18, 2013. After a unanimous decision victory over Vladimir Toktasynov in the semi-finals, he took a controversial extension round unanimous decision win over Frank Muñoz in the final.

He rematched Redouan Cairo at SuperKombat World Grand Prix 2013 IV in Giurgiu, Romania on October 12, 2013 and found himself on the receiving end of a brutal knee KO in round three.

He defeated Enver Šljivar via unanimous decision at the SUPERKOMBAT World Grand Prix I 2014 in Reșița, Romania on April 12, 2014.

He fought to a draw with Jallon Corentin at SUPERKOMBAT World Grand Prix II 2014 in Mamaia, Romania on May 24, 2014.

== Titles ==
- 2013 Superkombat World Grand Prix II tournament champion
- 2010 K-1 World Grand Prix in Bucharest tournament runner-up
- 2009 K-1 Rules Tournament in Budapest tournament runner-up
- Local Kombat Special Prize (2010)
- Local Kombat 20 tournament champion

== Kickboxing record ==
Kickboxing record
28 wins (4 (T) KOs, 23 decisions), 22 losses
Date	Result	Opponent	Event	Method	Round	Time
2016-10-01	Win	(United Kingdom) George Davies	SUPERKOMBAT, Romania	Decision	3	3:00
2016-07-02	Loss	(Netherlands) Yousri Belgaroui	Respect World Series 2, London, England	KO (high knee)	1	
2015-12-19	Loss	(China) Wang Chongyang	Kunlun Fight 35, Luoyang, China	Decision (unanimous)	3	
2015-11-16	Loss	(Albania) Muharrem Hasani	Illyrian Fight night, Winterthur, Switzerland	KO (punches)	3	
2015-10-16	Loss	(Morocco) Tarik Khbabez	ACB KB 3: Grand Prix Final, Sibiu, Romania	Decision (unanimous)	3	3:00
2015-09-26	Loss	(Lithuania) Julius Mocka	KOK World GP 2015 - Heavyweight Tournament, Quarter Finals, Chișinău, Moldova	Decision (split)	3	3:00
2015-06-19	Loss	(Suriname) Fabio Kwasi	SUPERKOMBAT World Grand Prix III 2015, Constanța, Romania	Decision	3	3:00
2015-04-17	Loss	(Netherlands) Gökhan Saki	GFC Fight Series 3, Dubai, United Arab Emirates	Decision (unanimous)	3	3:00
2015-04-04	Loss	(Moldova) Maxim Bolotov	KOK World GP 2015 Chișinău, Chișinău, Moldova	Decision (unanimous)	3	3:00
2014-10-31	Loss	(Russia) Vladimir Mineev	New Stream, Moscow, Russia	TKO (punches)	2	
2014-08-02	Win	(Russia) Nikolaj Falin	SUPERKOMBAT New Heroes 8, Constanța, Romania	Decision (unanimous)	3	3:00
2014-05-24	Draw	(France) Corentin Jallon	SUPERKOMBAT World Grand Prix II 2014, Mamaia, Romania	Draw	3	3:00
2014-04-12	Win	(Slovenia) Enver Šljivar	SUPERKOMBAT World Grand Prix I 2014, Reșița, Romania	Decision (unanimous)	3	3:00
2013-10-12	Loss	(Suriname) Redouan Cairo	SUPERCOMBAT World Grand Prix IV 2013, Giurgiu, Romania	KO (knee)	3	
2013-06-14	Loss	(Czech Republic) Tomáš Hron	Time of Gladiators, Brno, Czech Republic	Decision (unanimous)	3	3:00
For King of the Ring (+95kg) World title.
2013-05-18	Win	(Spain) Frank Muñoz	SUPERCOMBAT World Grand Prix II 2013, Final, Craiova, Romania	Ext. R decision (unanimous)	4	3:00
Wins Superkombat World Grand Prix II tournament title.
2013-05-18	Win	(Russia) Vladimir Toktasynov	SUPERCOMBAT World Grand Prix II 2013, Semi Finals, Craiova, Romania	Decision (unanimous)	3	3:00
2012-12-22	Loss	(Suriname) Ismael Londt	SUPERCOMBAT World Grand Prix 2012 Final, Semi Finals, Bucharest, Romania	TKO (cut)	2	
2012-11-10	Win	(Czech Republic) Roman Kleibl	SUPERCOMBAT World Grand Prix 2012 Final Elimination, Quarter Finals, Craiova, Romania	Decision (split)	3	3:00
2012-10-20	Win	(Bosnia and Herzegovina) Dževad Poturak	SuperKombat World Grand Prix IV 2012, Arad, Romania	Decision (unanimous)	3	3:00
2012-05-12	Win	(Suriname) Redouan Cairo	SuperKombat World Grand Prix II 2012, Cluj-Napoca, Romania	TKO	2	0:12
2011-10-15	Win	(Turkey) Ali Cenik	SUPERCOMBAT World Grand Prix IV 2011, Piatra Neamț, Romania	Decision (split)	3	3:00
2011-07-16	Loss	(Suriname) Ismael Londt	SUPERCOMBAT World Grand Prix II 2011 Semi Finals, Constanța, Romania	KO (left hook)	3	0:37
2011-05-21	Win	(Slovakia) Ratislav Talarovic	SUPERCOMBAT World Grand Prix I 2011, Bucharest, Romania	Decision (unanimous)	3	3:00
2011-03-18	Loss	(France) Freddy Kemayo	SUPERCOMBAT: The Pilot Show, Râmnicu Vâlcea, Romania	Ext. R decision (unanimous)	4	3:00
2010-11-20	Win	(Bulgaria) Petar Valkov	Local Kombat "10 ani in ring", Sibiu, Romania	Decision	3	3:00
2010-10-29	Loss	(Turkey) Erhan Deniz	Sarajevo Fight Night 2, Sarajevo, Bosnia and Herzegovina	Decision (unanimous)	3	3:00
2010-05-21	Loss	(France) Freddy Kemayo	K-1 World Grand Prix 2010, Bucharest, Romania	KO	3	2:46
For K-1 World Grand Prix 2010 tournament title.
2010-05-21	Win	(United States) Mighty Mo	K-1 World Grand Prix 2010, Bucharest, Romania	KO	1	2:24
2010-05-21	Win	(Estonia) Daniil Sapljoshin	K-1 World Grand Prix 2010, Bucharest, Romania	KO	1	0:47
2009-12-12	Loss	(Morocco) Mounir Zekhnini	K-1 ColliZion 2009 Final Tournament, Prague, Czech Republic	Decision (unanimous)	3	3:00
2009-08-11	Loss	(Ukraine) Sergei Lascenko	K-1 World Grand Prix 2009 in Tokyo Final 16 Qualifying GP, Tokyo, Japan	Decision (unanimous)	3	3:00
2009-07-03	Win	(Croatia) Matias Baric	K-1 ColliZion 2009 Sarajevo, Sarajevo, Bosnia and Herzegovina	Ext. R decision (unanimous)	4	3:00
2009-05-16	Win	(Czech Republic) Petr Vondracek	K-1 ColliZion 2009 Mladá Boleslav, Mladá Boleslav, Czech Republic	Decision (unanimous)	3	3:00
2009-04-12	Win	(New Zealand) Doug Viney	Local Kombat 33, Romania	Decision (unanimous)	3	3:00
2009-02-28	Loss	(Croatia) Mladen Brestovac	K-1 Rules Tournament 2009 in Budapest, Budapest, Hungary	Ext. R decision (unanimous)	4	3:00
For K-1 Rules Tournament 2009 in Budapest tournament title.
2009-02-28	Win	(Czech Republic) Roman Kleibl	K-1 Rules Tournament 2009 in Budapest, Budapest, Hungary	Decision (unanimous)	3	3:00
2009-02-28	Win	(Hungary) Dániel Török	K-1 Rules Tournament 2009 in Budapest, Budapest, Hungary	Decision (unanimous)	3	3:00
2008-12-12	Win	(United States) Jaime Fletcher	Local Kombat 32, Ploieşti, Romania	Decision (unanimous)	3	3:00
2008-11-06	Win	(Czech Republic) Petr Vondracek	Local Kombat 31, Buzău, Romania	Decision	3	3:00
2008-06-06	Loss	(Azerbaijan) Zabit Samedov	Local Kombat 30, Timișoara, Romania	Ext.R decision	4	3:00
2008-03-15	Win	(Bosnia and Herzegovina) Dženan Poturak	Local Kombat 29, Arad, Romania	Decision	3	3:00
2007-12-14	Win	(France) Lionel Joseph	Local Kombat 28, Brașov, Romania	Decision	3	3:00
2007-06-15	Win	(France) Samir Dourid	Local Kombat 26, Iaşi, Romania	Decision	3	3:00
2006-12-16	Win	(Belgium) Omar Benmahdi	Local Kombat 24, Bucharest, Romania	Ext. R decision	4	3:00
2006-09-29	Win	(Czech Republic) Roman Hurtik	Local Kombat 22, Iaşi, Romania	TKO	3	
2006-04-14	Win	(Romania) Alexandru Nedelcu	Local Kombat 20, Râmnicu Vâlcea, Romania	Decision	3	3:00
Wins Local Kombat 20 tournament title.
2006-04-14	Win	(Romania) Florin Ghiţă	Local Kombat 20, Râmnicu Vâlcea, Romania	Decision	3	3:00
2006-03-10	Win	(Romania) Alexandru Nedelcu	Local Kombat 19, Iaşi, Romania	Decision	3	3:00
2005-05-14	Loss	(Romania) Marius Tiţă	Local Kombat 14, Bucharest, Romania	Decision	3	3:00

== See also ==
- List of male kickboxers
- List of K-1 events
