= Mighty Mo (kickboxer) =

American Samoan martial arts fighter (born 1970)

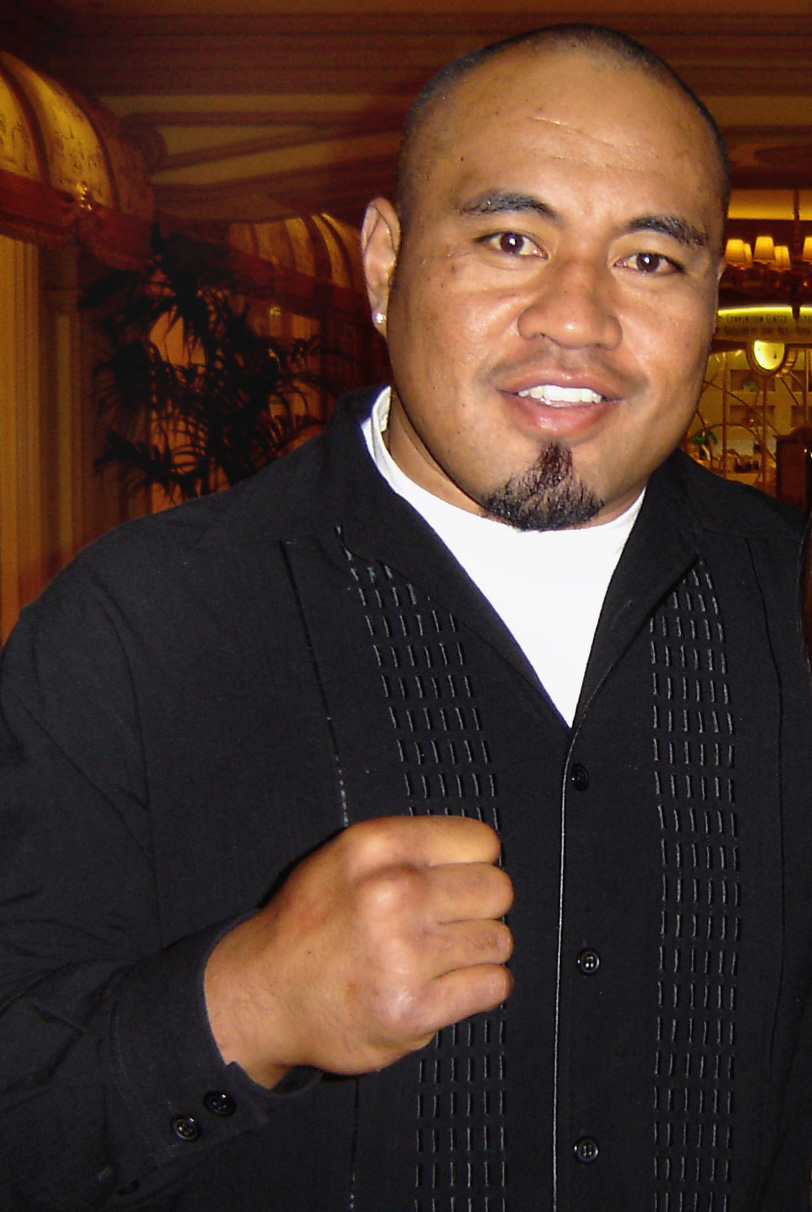
- Born: Siala-Mou Siliga; October 8, 1970 (age 56); Pago Pago, American Samoa
- Other names: Mighty Mo
- Nationality: Samoan & American
- Height: 6 ft 1 in (185 cm)
- Weight: 297 lb (135 kg; 21 st 3 lb)
- Division: Heavyweight
- Fighting out of: San Bernardino, California, U.S.
- Team: Aguirre Fighting System
- Trainer: Franklin Aguirre
- Years active: 2003–2018 (MMA); 2004–2018(Kickboxing); 2006–2007, 2019 (Boxing)

Professional boxing record
- Total: 4
- Wins: 2
- By knockout: 2
- Losses: 2

Kickboxing record
- Total: 42
- Wins: 20
- By knockout: 12
- Losses: 22
- By knockout: 11

Mixed martial arts record
- Total: 18
- Wins: 12
- By knockout: 9
- By submission: 3
- Losses: 6
- By knockout: 2
- By submission: 3
- By decision: 1

Other information
- Spouse: Tafia Palu 1997-2010
- Children: John Bismark Siliga Siala Mou Siliga Jr. Saeu Tusi Diana Makayley Salote Siliga Carrie Lynn Siliga Monalani Lemauga Siliga Nu’uali’ilani Faith Juliana Siliga Harmouny Sugalu Siliga Mike Lema’a Bruce Siliga King Mou Tamotu Siliga Princess Viena Falemoi Tulili Love Siliga
- Boxing record from BoxRec
- Mixed martial arts record from Sherdog
- Last updated on: November 20, 2021

Siala-Mou Siliga (surname pronounced Sahlingah, born October 8, 1970), often billed as Mighty Mo is a former American Samoan kickboxer, bare knuckle boxer, boxer and mixed martial artist who competed in the Heavyweight division. At the age of 22, he got his nickname from his former American football coach after the battleship USS Missouri. His K-1 achievements include winning the K-1 World Grand Prix 2004 in Las Vegas II and the K-1 World Grand Prix 2007 in Hawaii tournaments. In mixed martial arts, he has competed for K-1 Hero's, Bellator MMA, DREAM, Road FC and also participated in the Dynamite!! USA and Dynamite!! 2008 events. On September 24, 2016, Siliga won the Road FC Openweight Tournament at Road FC 33 by knocking out Choi Hong-man of South Korea.

== Career ==
=== Kickboxing ===
Mighty Mo made his K-1 debut on February 15, 2004, at "K-1 Burning" event in Japan against Hiraku Hori. He knocked out Hori at 1:22 in 4th round by right hook. After losing in semifinals at his first 8-man tournament in Las Vegas against fellow American Dewey Cooper, Mighty Mo made a huge comeback four months later at the Battle of Bellagio II, winning his first K-1 GP Championship by knocking out Brecht Wallis in 2nd Round at the tournament finals.

After a year off from K-1, he made his comeback on March 4, 2007, at Yokohama, Japan. His opponent was Choi Hong-man (218 cm/7′2″) from Korea who had never been knocked out before on his K-1 career until Mighty Mo (185 cm/6′1″) managed to land his trademark right overhand punch, winning the fight by KO at 0:50 KO in 2nd round. At that time, he held the record for the "Biggest height difference wins (33cm/12.9inches)" resulting in a KO in favor of the shorter in K-1 history. But on December 31, 2007, at the K-1 Dynamite Tournament in Osaka, the record was surpassed by Danish Karate fighter Nicholas Pettas (178 cm/5′10″), who was able to KO the 217 cm/7′1.½″ Korean Kim Young-hyun (39 cm/15.3inches height difference). In professional Boxing the record stands at 38 cm/14.9inches height difference when Randy Davis (1.80m/5′11″) knocked out Tom Payne (2.18m/7′2″) in 1985.

On April 28, 2007, Mo entered the K-1 World GP 2007 in Hawaii tournament as a heavy favorite. He knocked out all three of his opponents and earned himself a spot in the K-1 World GP 2007 Elimination in Seoul, Korea.

On June 23, 2007, Mighty Mo lost to defending K-1 Super Heavyweight Champion Semmy Schilt by unanimous decision at the K-1 World GP in Amsterdam. Semmy used his reach to keep Mighty Mo at bay, and Mo was unable to get in close enough to land his devastating overhand right. Rumors surfaced that Mo was nursing a knee and hand injuries from his previous fights. He had fought 7 times in the last 4 months.

At the K-1 Final Eliminations 2007 on September 29, he faced Choi Hong-man again and lost by unanimous decision. During the fight, he was kicked in the groin and was inexplicably ruled a knockdown by the referee. He was quoted in the post-fight interview: "I feel I was robbed. I should have won. There was a lot of favoritism here. He must have picked up a new technique-a kick below the belt. So next time I'll wear a thicker cup. And next time I want to fight somewhere else."

In his next three fights he went 1-2, losing to Paul Slowinski and Keijiro Maeda before defeating Justice Smith on August 9, 2008.

Mighty Mo had replaced Andrei Arlovski at the K-1 World Grand Prix 2010 in Seoul Final 16 held in Seoul against Romanian Raul Cătinaș and won by unanimous decision. As a result, Mo was the only American to make it into the K-1 World Grand Prix 2010 Final on December, 11th. His quarterfinal opponent was Peter Aerts who beat him via TKO in the first round.

Mighty Mo was knocked out by Russian Sergei Kharitonov at the United Glory World Series Finals in Moscow on May 28, 2011.

As of October 2011 Mighty Mo is currently on a six fight losing streak in Kickboxing, all but one by knockout.

He was next set to face Rick Roufus in Las Vegas on October 22, 2011. However, he was not medically cleared to compete.

He rematched Raul Cătinaş, the last man he was able to defeat, in a non-tournament bout at the SuperKombat World Grand Prix 2012 Final in Bucharest, Romania on December 22, 2012, and lost on a unanimous decision.

=== Mixed martial arts career ===
Mo made his professional MMA debut in October 2003. He won his first three MMA fights all by knockout over a period of three and a half years.

==== Dynamite!! ====
Mo was originally supposed to face Choi Mu-bae in a MMA match at K-1 Dynamite!! USA on June 2 in Los Angeles, California. But Choi was replaced in the last minute by Ruben "Warpath" Villareal. Mighty Mo dominated Villareal, forcing the referee, Herb Dean, to stop the fight at 1:33 of the first round.

Mo next faced K-1 kickboxing champion Semmy Schilt at the Fields Dynamite!! 2008 2008 event in an MMA bout, in which Schilt defeated Mighty Mo in the first round by triangle choke.

==== DREAM ====
In 2009, Mo signed with the DREAM promotion in Japan. He was set to fight Mirko "Cro Cop" Filipović at DREAM 10 but Cro Cop pulled out after re-signing with the UFC.

Mo instead made his debut against Josh Barnett at DREAM 13 on March 21, 2010, and lost via submission in the first round.

==== Bellator MMA ====
In 2013, Mo refocused his efforts on MMA and signed with Bellator MMA. He made his debut in September 2013 at Bellator 100 where he defeated Dan Charles by TKO. Mo returned just over a month later at Bellator 106 where he defeated Ron Sparks by submission.

In March 2014, Mo entered the Bellator Season Ten Heavyweight Tournament. He faced fellow kickboxer Peter Graham in the opening round at Bellator 111 on March 7, 2014. Mo won the fight via submission in the third round. In the semifinals, Mo faced Russian fighter Alexander Volkov on April 11, 2014, at Bellator 116. He lost the fight via knockout in the first round.

Mo was released from the organization on August 25, 2014.

==== Road FC ====
On October 9, 2015, at Road FC 026 in Seoul, South Korea, Mo defeated Choi Mu-bae by 1st-round KO in 37 seconds. On December 26 at Road FC 027 in Shanghai, China, Mo defeated Choi Mu-bae by Technical Knockout at the 3:46 mark of round 1, in a rematch of their Road FC 26 match up.

On April 16, 2016, at Road FC 030 in Beijing, China, Mo defeated Hyun-man Myung by neck crank in round 3 to win Openweight tournament semi-finals. On September 24 at Road FC 033 in Seoul, South Korea, Mo defeated Choi Hong-man by knockout in round 4 to win the Road FC Openweight Championship. On September 25 Mo signed an exclusive contract with the Road FC. On December 10 at Road FC 035 in Seoul, South Korea, Mo retained his Openweight Title with a first-round knockout of Carlos Toyota. Mo next faced Dong-gook Kang at Road FC 040, winning the fight via technical knockout in the second round. Mo fought Gilbert Yvel at Road FC 47, losing the fight via armbar submission in the first round.

=== Bare-Knuckle Boxing ===
Mighty Mo entered the Valor Bare Knuckle 1 Heavyweight Tournament, VBK:1; this was the debut event for Ken Shamrock's newly founded bare-knuckle boxing organization. Mighty Mo defeated Sokoudjou by 3rd round TKO and entered the finals against Mark Godbeer. Unlike Godbeer, Mighty Mo had not been able to quickly defeat his prior opponent (Godbeer quickly knocked out his first opponent in less than a minute). He lost via TKO after he was unable to get up in time to answer the 10 count

== Fighting Style ==
Mighty Mo is largely a stand-up fighter known for his strong striking power; he specifically possesses a powerful overhand-right and has used it to knock out several of his opponents.

== Championships and Accomplishments ==
=== Mixed Martial Arts ===
- Bellator MMA
  - Bellator Season Ten Heavyweight Tournament Semifinalist
- Universal Above Ground Fighting
  - U.A.G.F. Heavyweight Championship (One time)
- Road Fighting Championship
  - Road FC Openweight Champion (First; current)
  - Two Successful Title Defenses
  - 2016 Road FC Openweight Tournament Winner

=== Kickboxing ===
- K-1
  - K-1 World Grand Prix 2010 in Bucharest 3rd Place
  - 2007 K-1 World Grand Prix in Hawaii Champion
  - 2004 K-1 World Grand Prix in Las Vegas II Champion

=== Bare-Knuckle Boxing ===
- Valor Bare Knuckle
  - VKB:1 Heavyweight Tournament Finalist

=== Other ===
- North West Toughman Champion

== Mixed martial arts record ==
Professional record breakdown
18 matches	12 wins	6 losses
By knockout	9	2
By submission	3	3
By decision	0	1

Res.	Record	Opponent	Method	Event	Date	Round	Time	Location	Notes
Loss	12–6	Gilbert Yvel	Technical Submission (armbar)	Road FC 047	May 12, 2018	1	3:43	Beijing, China	Road FC 2018 Openweight Grand Prix R1.
Win	12–5	Dong-gook Kang	TKO (punches)	Road FC 040	July 15, 2017	2	2:27	Seoul, South Korea	Defended the Road FC Openweight Championship.
Win	11–5	Carlos Toyota	KO (punches)	Road FC 035	December 10, 2016	1	1:10	Seoul, South Korea	Defended the Road FC Openweight Championship.
Win	10–5	Hong-man Choi	KO (punch)	Road FC 033	September 24, 2016	1	4:06	Seoul, South Korea	Won the Road FC Openweight Tournament the Road FC Openweight Championship.
Win	9–5	Hyun-man Myung	Submission (neck crank)	Road FC 030 in China	April 16, 2016	3	1:12	Beijing, China	Road FC Openweight Tournament Semifinals.
Win	8–5	Mu-bae Choi	TKO (punches)	Road FC 027 in China	December 26, 2015	1	3:46	Shanghai, China	Road FC Openweight Tournament Quarterfinals.
Win	7–5	Mu-bae Choi	KO (punch)	Road FC 026	October 9, 2015	1	0:37	Seoul, South Korea	
Loss	6–5	Denis Stojnić	Decision (unanimous)	HIT-FC	June 27, 2015	3	5:00	Zurich, Switzerland	
Loss	6–4	Alexandru Lungu	TKO (punches)	Real Xtreme Fighting 15	December 15, 2014	1	0:52	Bucharest, Romania	Super Heavyweight bout.
Loss	6–3	Alexander Volkov	KO (head kick)	Bellator 116	April 11, 2014	1	2:44	Temecula, California, United States	Bellator Season Ten Heavyweight Tournament Semifinal.
Win	6–2	Peter Graham	Submission (Arm-Triangle Choke)	Bellator 111	March 7, 2014	3	2:31	Thackerville, Oklahoma, United States	Bellator Season Ten Heavyweight Tournament Quarterfinal.
Win	5–2	Ron Sparks	Submission (Keylock)	Bellator 105	October 25, 2013	1	2:52	Rio Rancho, New Mexico, United States	
Win	4–2	Dan Charles	TKO (punches)	Bellator 100	September 20, 2013	3	1:26	Phoenix, Arizona, United States	
Loss	3–2	Josh Barnett	Submission (Kimura)	DREAM 13	March 22, 2010	1	4:41	Yokohama, Kanagawa, Japan	
Loss	3–1	Semmy Schilt	Submission (triangle choke)	Fields Dynamite!! 2008	December 31, 2008	1	5:31	Saitama, Saitama, Japan	
Win	3–0	Ruben Villareal	TKO (punches)	Dynamite!! USA	June 2, 2007	1	1:33	Los Angeles, California, United States	
Win	2–0	Min-soo Kim	KO (punch)	HERO'S 8	March 12, 2007	1	2:37	Nagoya, Aichi, Japan	
Win	1–0	Mark Smith	KO (knee to the body)	UAGF 4: Ultimate Cage Fighting	October 12, 2003	2	2:36	Upland, California, United States	

== Kickboxing record (Incomplete) ==
Kickboxing record (Incomplete)
20 Wins (12 (T)KO's), 22 Losses, 2 Draws
Date	Result	Opponent	Event	Location	Method	Round	Time
2018-11-17	Win	(Japan) Kengo Shimizu	Rise 129	Tokyo, Japan	TKO (punches)	3	0:55
2018-09-17	Loss	(Brazil) Jairo Kusunoki	HEAT 43	Kariya, Japan	Extra Round Decision	4	3:00
2015-12-05	Loss	(Czech Republic) Tomáš Hron	GIBU Fight Night 2	Prague, Czech Republic	KO	2	N/A
2015-02-01	Loss	(Latvia) Konstantin Gluhov	Kunlun Fight 18	Guangzhou, China	TKO (fist injury)	1	2:00
Super Heavyweight Tournament, Final 16.
2012-12-22	Loss	(Romania) Raul Cătinaș	SUPERKOMBAT World Grand Prix 2012 Final	Bucharest, Romania	Decision (unanimous)	3	3:00
2012-09-08	Loss	(United States) Rick Roufus	K-1 World Grand Prix 2012 in Los Angeles	Los Angeles, California, USA	Decision (split)	3	3:00
To qualify for the K-1 World Grand Prix 2012 in Tokyo final 16.
2012-03-03	Loss	(Germany) Florian Pavic	3rd Steko Fight Night	Munich, Germany	Decision	5	3:00
2011-11-23	Loss	(Japan) Raoumaru	RISE 85: Heavyweight Tournament 2011	Tokyo, Japan	KO (knee)	3	2:49
2011 RISE Heavyweight Tournament Quarter-finals.
2011-07-30	Loss	(Australia) Ben Edwards	Capital Punishment 4	Canberra, Australia	KO (right knee)	2	2:18
2011-07-16	Loss	(Croatia) Mladen Brestovac	SUPERKOMBAT World Grand Prix II 2011	Constanța, Romania	KO (left kick to the body)	1	2:18
SuperKombat WGP II Semi-finals.
2011-05-28	Loss	(Russia) Sergei Kharitonov	United Glory 14: 2010-2011 World Series Finals	Moscow, Russia	KO (right uppercut)	1	1:59
2010-12-11	Loss	(Netherlands) Peter Aerts	K-1 World Grand Prix 2010 Final	Tokyo, Japan	KO (punches and kick)	1	2:20
2010 K-1 World Grand Prix Quarter-finals.
2010-10-02	Win	(Romania) Raul Cătinaș	K-1 World Grand Prix 2010 in Seoul Final 16	Seoul, South Korea	Decision (unanimous)	3	3:00
2010 K-1 World Grand Prix opening round.
2010-05-21	Loss	(Romania) Sebastian Ciobanu	K-1 World Grand Prix 2010 in Bucharest	Bucharest, Romania	KO (kick to the throat)	1	2:24
2010 Bucharest Grand Prix Semi-finals.
2010-05-21	Win	(Czech Republic) Roman Kleibl	K-1 World Grand Prix 2010 in Bucharest	Bucharest, Romania	KO	3	1:56
2010 Bucharest Grand Prix Quarter-finals.
2009-10-24	Loss	(Romania) Cătălin Moroşanu	K-1 ColliZion 2009 Final Elimination	Arad, Romania	Extra Round Decision (split)	4	3:00
2008-08-09	Win	(United States) Justice Smith	K-1 World Grand Prix 2008 in Hawaii	Honolulu, Hawaii, USA	Decision (majority)	3	3:00
2008 Hawaii Grand Prix Quarter-finals.
2008-04-13	Loss	(Japan) Kyotaro	K-1 World Grand Prix 2008 in Yokohama	Yokohama, Japan	Extra Round Decision (unanimous)	4	3:00
2007-12-08	Loss	(Poland) Paul Slowinski	K-1 World Grand Prix 2007 Final	Yokohama, Japan	TKO (low kicks)	2	0:50
2007-09-29	Loss	(South Korea) Choi Hong-man	K-1 World Grand Prix 2007 in Seoul Final 16	Seoul, South Korea	Decision (unanimous)	3	3:00
2007 K-1 World Grand Prix opening round.
2007-08-11	Loss	(Germany) Stefan Leko	K-1 World Grand Prix 2007 in Las Vegas	Las Vegas, Nevada, USA	Decision (unanimous)	3	3:00
2007-06-23	Loss	(Netherlands) Semmy Schilt	K-1 World Grand Prix 2007 in Amsterdam	Amsterdam, Netherlands	Decision (unanimous)	3	3:00
For K-1 Super Heavyweight Championship.
2007-04-04	Win	(Russia) Aleksandr Pitchkounov	K-1 World Grand Prix 2007 in Hawaii	Honolulu, Hawaii, USA	KO (punches)	3	0:46
2007 Hawaii Grand Prix Final.
2007-04-04	Win	(South Africa) Jan Nortje	K-1 World Grand Prix 2007 in Hawaii	Honolulu, Hawaii, USA	KO (right punch)	2	1:50
2007 Hawaii Grand Prix Semi-finals.
2007-04-04	Win	(South Korea) Kim Kyoung-suk	K-1 World Grand Prix 2007 in Hawaii	Honolulu, Hawaii, USA	KO (straight punch)	1	1:37
2007 Hawaii Grand Prix Quarter-finals.
2007-03-04	Win	(South Korea) Choi Hong-man	K-1 World Grand Prix 2007 in Yokohama	Yokohama, Japan	KO (right overhand)	2	0:50
2006-11-04	Win	(France) Abdel Lamidi	K-1 Fighting Network Riga 2006	Riga, Latvia	KO (right overhand)	1	2:17
2006-07-30	Loss	(Suriname) Remy Bonjasky	K-1 World Grand Prix 2006 in Sapporo	Sapporo, Japan	Decision (unanimous)	3	3:00
2005-09-23	Loss	(Netherlands) Peter Aerts	K-1 World Grand Prix 2005 in Osaka - Final Elimination	Osaka, Japan	KO (left low kick)	2	0:42
2005-08-13	Win	(South Africa) Francois Botha	K-1 World Grand Prix 2005 in Las Vegas II	Las Vegas, Nevada, USA	TKO (3 knockdowns)	1	1:20
2005-04-30	Win	(Suriname) Remy Bonjasky	K-1 World Grand Prix 2005 in Las Vegas	Las Vegas, Nevada, USA	Decision (split)	3	3:00
2004-12-04	Loss	(Thailand) Kaoklai Kaennorsing	K-1 World Grand Prix 2004 Final	Tokyo, Japan	KO (right high kick)	1	2:40
2004-09-25	Win	(Trinidad and Tobago) Gary Goodridge	K-1 World Grand Prix 2004 Final Elimination	Tokyo, Japan	TKO (3 knockdowns)	1	2:58
2004-08-07	Win	(Belgium) Brecht Wallis	K-1 World Grand Prix 2004 in Las Vegas II	Las Vegas, Nevada, USA	KO (right overhand)	2	2:55
2004 Las Vegas Grand Prix II Final.
2004-08-07	Win	(United States) Scott Lighty	K-1 World Grand Prix 2004 in Las Vegas II	Las Vegas, Nevada, USA	KO (right overhand)	1	1:29
2004 Las Vegas Grand Prix II semi-finals.
2004-08-07	Win	(Belarus) Sergei Gur	K-1 World Grand Prix 2004 in Las Vegas II	Las Vegas, Nevada, USA	Decision (unanimous)	3	3:00
2004 Las Vegas Grand Prix II Quarter-finals.
2004-04-30	Loss	(United States) Dewey Cooper	K-1 World Grand Prix 2004 in Las Vegas I	Las Vegas, Nevada, USA	Decision (unanimous)	3	3:00
2004 Las Vegas Grand Prix I Semi-finals.
2004-04-30	Win	(United States) Carter Williams	K-1 World Grand Prix 2004 in Las Vegas I	Las Vegas, Nevada, USA	TKO	3	1:52
2004 Las Vegas Grand Prix I Quarter-finals.
2004-02-15	Win	(Japan) Hiraku Hori	K-1 Burning 2004	Okinawa, Japan	KO (right hook)	4	1:22
Legend: Win Loss Draw/No contest Notes

== Boxing record ==
Key to abbreviations used for results
DQ	Disqualification	RTD	Corner retirement
KO	Knockout	SD	Split decision / split draw
MD	Majority decision / majority draw	TD	Technical decision / technical draw
NC	No contest	TKO	Technical knockout
PTS	Points decision	UD	Unanimous decision / unanimous draw

Boxing record
No.	Result	Record	Opponent	Type	Round(s)	Time	Date	Location	Notes
4	Loss	2–2	(United States) Rodney Hernandez	UD	4	N/A	November 21, 2014	DoubleTree Hotel, Ontario, California, USA	
3	Win	2–1	(United States) William Jackson	KO	1	1:08	August 2, 2007	Marriott Hotel, Irvine, California, USA	
2	Win	1–1	(United States) Christopher Valente	KO	1	0:17	November 17, 2006	Morongo Casino Resort & Spa, Cabazon, California, USA	
1	Loss	0–1	(United States) Lamar Stephens	UD	6	N/A	May 18, 2006	Hard Rock Live Arena, Hollywood, Florida, USA	

== Bare-Knuckle Boxing ==
Professional record breakdown
2 matches	1 win	1 loss
By knockout	1	1

Res.	Record	Opponent	Method	Event	Date	Round	Time	Location	Notes
Loss	1–1	Mark Godbeer	TKO (stoppage)	VKB-Valor Bare Knuckle 1	September 21, 2019	1	2:56	New Town, ND, US, 4 Bears Casino and Lodge	Heavyweight Tournament Finals.
Win	1–0	Rameau Thierry Sokoudjou	TKO (punches)	VKB-Valor Bare Knuckle 1	September 21, 2019	3	1:26	New Town, ND, US, 4 Bears Casino and Lodge	Heavyweight Tournament Semi-Finals.

== See also ==
- List of K-1 events
- List of K-1 champions
- List of male kickboxers
