= Mladen Kujundžić =

Croatian kickboxer and mixed martial artist

- Born: Mladen Kujundžić; August 3, 1989 (age 37); Rijeka, Croatia
- Other names: Dynamite
- Nationality: Croatian
- Height: 1.88 m (6 ft 2 in)
- Weight: 95 kg (209 lb; 14 st 13 lb)
- Division: Heavyweight
- Style: Kickboxing
- Fighting out of: Opatija, Croatia
- Team: Opatija Fight Club (2008–2012); Dynamite Fight Club (2012–2024)
- Trainer: Mladen Krajnčec (2008–2012); Ivan Filipović (2012–2024)
- Years active: 2008–2024

Kickboxing record
- Total: 41
- Wins: 28
- By knockout: 11
- Losses: 13
- By knockout: 3

Mixed martial arts record
- Total: 11
- Wins: 4
- By knockout: 3
- Losses: 6
- Draws: 1

Other information
- Boxing record from BoxRec
- Mixed martial arts record from Sherdog

Mladen Kujundžić (born August 3, 1989) is a Croatian retired kickboxer and mixed martial artist fighting out of Opatija, Croatia.

In April 2017, he was ranked the #10 light-heavyweight in the world by LiverKick.com. In June and July 2016, he was ranked the #9 heavyweight in the world by Combat Press.

== Kickboxing career ==
=== Early career ===
Kujundžić had his first professional fight against Denis Marjanović, on September 25, 2010. He won the fight by unanimous decision. The two of them fought a rematch two months later, with Marjanović winning a unanimous decision. During the Bilić Erić Security Fight Night 5 event, Kujundžić fought Ivica Ivić. He won the fight by a second-round knockout, stopping Ivić with a low kick. He would go on to win his next three fights against Tom Van Duivenvoorde, Ivica Soldo and Jasmin Bečirović, before taking part in the Fight Code: Rhinos Series tournament. Kujundžić beat Anatoloy Nosyrev by TKO in the first fight, but lost to Freddy Kemayo in the quarterfinals.

After this tournament loss, Kujundžić was scheduled to fight Rok Štrucl at WFC 15. The fight went into an extra round, after which Štrucl won by decision. Bouncing back from the first losing streak of his career, Kujundžić won his next three fights. He won his first fight against Marin Došen by decision, and beat Srđan Seleš and Nermin Terzić by TKO. At the 8. Kickboxing Memorijal David Šain event, Kujundžić was scheduled to fight Igor Mihaljević. Igor Mihaljević won the fight by unanimous decision.

=== Final Fight Championship ===
In 2013, Kujundžić signed with Final Fight Championship. He made his organizational debut during FFC03, in a rematch with Rok Štrucl. He won the rematch by unanimous decision. At FFC06, Kujundžić fought Nikola Dimkovski, winning the fight by unanimous decision. He won his next two fight against Alija Tucak and Sanid Imamović by DQ and TKO respectively, extending his winning streak to four.

He made his Glory debut at Glory 14: Zagreb, when he was scheduled to fight Elmir Mehić. He won the fight by TKO, after the ringside doctor stopped the fight at the end of the second round. At FFC12, Kujundžić knocked out Dženan Poturak with middle kick in the first round. His winning streak was stopped by Alexandr Bodruchin at FFC15, who knocked him out in the first round.

=== K-1 and Tatneft cup ===
Kujundžić rebounded from this loss by winning his next two fights against Janos Koszfan and Andre Langen by decision. At WFL Laktaši, Kujundžić fought Fabio Kwasi for the first time. Kwasi won the fight by a second-round TKO.

Kujundžić once again rebounded from a loss by winning his next two fights, winning a decision against Vasil Ducar and knocking out Frank Muñoz. He next fought Maxim Bolotov in the 2016 Tatneft Cup selection tournament. Bolotov won the fight by an extra round decision.

At Respect World Series 1, Kujundžić achieved the highest profile win of his career up to that point, managing to knock out the former SUPERKOMBAT Super Cruiserweight champion Andrei Stoica.

Kujundžić took part in the 2016 K-1 Belgrade Heavyweight tournament, being scheduled to fight Fabio Kwasi. Kwasi once again won the fight by unanimous decision. Kujundžić further participated in the 2017 Tatneft Cup selection tournament. He knocked out Rustam Azimov in the first round of the tournament, but lost to Petr Romankevich in the second round by decision.

=== FEA ===
After a year long layoff, Kujundžić returned to fight Françesco Xhaja at Legends Collide. He lost by unanimous decision.

In 2019, Kujundžić signed with FEA. In his first fight with the organization, he fought Alexandru Burduja. The fight went into an extra round, after which he won a split decision. He won his next fight against Joao Chapas Silva by decision, as well.

He was scheduled to fight Mikhail Tyuterev in the semifinals of the 2020 FEA Heavyweight GP, but the fight never materialized.

Kujundžić challenged Alexandru Burduja for the FEA Light Heavyweight (-93 kg) championship at FEA Full Drive on December 17, 2022. He captured the title by split decision.

Kujundžić faced Arseniy Smirnov at RCC 16 on July 28, 2023. He lost the fight by unanimous decision.

Kujundžić faced Ivan Petrenko at RCC 25 on February 3, 2024. He lost the fight by a second-round technical knockout.

Kujundžić announced his retirement from professional competition on February 4, 2024.

== Awards, records, and honors ==
- Combat Press
  - 2016 Fight of the Year nomination (vs. Andrei Stoica)
- Fighting Entertainment Association
  - 2022 FEA Light Heavyweight (-93 kg) Championship

== Professional kickboxing record ==
Mladen Kujundžić kickboxing record
28 Wins (11 (T)KOs), 13 Losses
Date	Result	Opponent	Event	Location	Method	Round	Time
2024-02-03	Loss	(Russia) Ivan Petrenko	RCC 25	Yekaterinburg, Russia	TKO (Referee stoppage)	2	
2023-07-28	Loss	(Russia) Arseniy Smirnov	RCC 16	Yekaterinburg, Russia	Decision (Unanimous)	3	3:00
2022-12-27	Win	(Moldova) Alexandru Burduja	FEA Full Drive	Ciorescu, Moldova	Decision (Split)	5	3:00
Wins the FEA Light Heavyweight (-93 kg) title.
2022-05-22	Loss	(Belgium) Younes Benmalek	Alpha Fight League	Brusells, Belgium	Decision	3	3:00
2019-08-24	Win	(Portugal) Joao Chapas Silva	FEA World GP Odesa	Odesa, Ukraine	Decision (Unanimous)	3	3:00
2019-03-30	Win	(Moldova) Alexandru Burduja	FEN	Chișinău, Moldova	Ext. R. Decision (Split)	4	3:00
2018-11-17	Loss	(Italy) Françesco Xhaja	Legends Collide	Slovenia	Decision (Unanimous)	3	3:00
2017-07-20	Loss	(Belarus) Petr Romankevich	Tatneft Cup 2017 - 1st selection 1/4 final	Kazan, Russia	Decision (Unanimous)	4	3:00
2017-05-31	Win	(Uzbekistan) Rustam Azimov	Tatneft Cup 2017 - 3rd selection 1/8 final	Kazan, Russia	KO (Low kicks)	2	2:10
2016-10-27	Loss	(Suriname) Fabio Kwasi	K-1 World GP 2016 -95kg Championship Tournament	Belgrade, Serbia	Decision (Unanimous)	3	3:00
2016-03-19	Win	(Romania) Andrei Stoica	Respect World Series 1	Madrid, Spain	KO (Left Hook)	1	
2016-02-12	Loss	(Moldova) Maxim Bolotov	Tatneft Cup 2016 - 1st Selection 1/8 Final	Kazan, Russia	Decision	4	3:00
2015-11-27	Win	(Spain) Frank Muñoz	FFC21: Rijeka	Rijeka, Croatia	KO (Right High Kick)	2	2:43
2015-10-31	Win	(Czech Republic) Vasil Ducar	Opatija Fight Night 6	Opatija, Croatia	Ext. R. Decision	4	3:00
2015-09-25	Loss	(Suriname) Fabio Kwasi	WFL Laktaši	Laktaši, Bosnia and Herzegovina	TKO (Ref. Stoppage)	2	
2015-09-04	Win	(Germany) Andre Langen	Tatneft Cup 2015 Final	Kazan, Russia	Decision	4	3:00
2015-04-08	Win	(Hungary) Janos Koszfan	Oluja u ringu 7	Knin, Croatia	Decision (Unanimous)	3	3:00
2014-11-21	Loss	(Ukraine) Alexandr Bodruchin	FFC15: Poreč	Poreč, Croatia	KO (Straight Right)	1	
2014-04-25	Win	(Bosnia and Herzegovina) Dženan Poturak	FFC12: Fabjan vs. Daley	Ljubljana, Slovenia	KO (Left Middle Kick)	1	
2014-03-08	Win	(Bosnia and Herzegovina) Elmir Mehić	Glory 14: Zagreb	Zagreb, Croatia	TKO (Doctor stoppage)	2	3:00
2013-10-25	Win	(Bosnia and Herzegovina) Sanid Imamović	FFC08: Zelg vs. Rodriguez	Zagreb, Croatia	TKO	1	1:19
2013-09-13	Win	(Bosnia and Herzegovina) Alija Tucak	Fight For Glory	Banja Luka, Bosnia and Herzegovina	DQ (Headbutt)	3	
2013-06-14	Win	(Serbia) Nikola Dimkovski	FFC06: Jurković vs. Poturak	Poreč, Croatia	Decision (Unanimous)	3	3:00
2013-04-18	Win	(Slovenia) Rok Štrucl	FFC03: Jurković vs. Cătinaș	Split, Croatia	Decision (Unanimous)	3	3:00
2013-04-07	Loss	(Croatia) Igor Mihaljević	8. Kickboxing Memorijal David Šain	Poreč, Croatia	Decision (Unanimous)	3	3:00
2012-10-27	Win	(Bosnia and Herzegovina) Nermin Terzić	Bajić Team & Ameno Fight Night Split	Split, Croatia	TKO (Low kick)	1	0:05
2012-07-21	Win	(Serbia) Srđan Seleš	Mega Fight	Umag, Croatia	TKO (Referee stoppage)	3	
2012-03-10	Win	(Croatia) Marin Došen	Cro Cop Final Fight	Zagreb, Croatia	Ext.R.Decision (Unanimous)	4	3:00
2011-12-18	Loss	(Slovenia) Rok Štrucl	WFC 15 - Olimp Sport Nutrition	Ljubljana, Slovenia	Ex.R.Decision	4	3:00
2011-10-22	Loss	(France) Freddy Kemayo	Fight Code: Rhinos Series, Quarter Finals	Moscow, Russia	Decision (unanimous)	3	3:00
2011-07-09	Win	(Russia) Anatoloy Nosyrev	Fight Code: Rhinos Series, Final 16 (Part 2)	Istanbul, Turkey	TKO (Injury)		
2011-04-09	Win	(Slovenia) Jasmin Bečirović	Slovenian muay thai league	Brežice, Slovenia	Decision	3	3:00
2011-02-20	Win	(Bosnia and Herzegovina) Ivica Soldo	Opatija Fight Night 3	Opatija, Croatia			
2010-12-10	Win	(Netherlands) Tom Van Duivenvoorde	Podgorica Fight Night	Podgorica, Montenegro	KO	2	
2010-11-28	Win	(Croatia) Ivica Ivić	Bilić Erić Security Fight Night 5	Zagreb, Croatia	KO (Low Kick)	2	
2010-11-06	Loss	(Bosnia and Herzegovina) Denis Marjanović	Banja Luka Fight Night 2	Banja Luka, Bosnia and Herzegovina	Decision (Unanimous)	3	3:00
2010-09-25	Win	(Bosnia and Herzegovina) Denis Marjanović	Fight Night	Viškovo, Croatia	Decision (Unanimous)	3	2:00
Legend: Win Loss Draw/No contest Notes

== Mixed martial arts record ==
Professional record breakdown
11 matches	4 wins	6 losses
By knockout	3	1
By submission	1	5
Draws	1	

Res.	Record	Opponent	Method	Event	Date	Round	Time	Location	Notes
Loss	4–6–1	Vlado Neferanović	Submission (Rear-naked choke)	FNC 7	Sep 3, 2022	1	1:08	Pula, Croatia	
Loss	4–5–1	Lukasz Sudolski	KO (Punches)	Babilon MMA 18	Nov 27, 2020	1	0:13	Łódź, Poland	
Loss	4–4–1	Gerald Turek	Submission (Rear-Naked Choke)	WFC 16 - Return of the Champions	Apr 22, 2012	2		Ljubljana, Slovenia	
Loss	4–3–1	Denis Stojnić	Submission (Rear-Naked Choke)	United Glory - 2010-2011 World Series Finals	May 28, 2011	1	4:59	Moscow, Russia	
Loss	4–2–1	Matteo Minonzio	Submission (Guillotine Choke)	SLAM FC 3	Feb 12, 2011	1		Florence, Italy	
Win	4–1–1	Mihajlo Fincur	TKO (Knees)	TBCB - K-1 and FreeFight Night	Apr 24, 2010	1		Brežice, Slovenia	
Win	3–1–1	Alen Dolicanin	Submission (Rear-Naked Choke)	MedVid - Ultimate Fight Labin	Mar 7, 2010	1		Labin, Croatia	
Loss	2–1–1	Pero Ogrizek	Submission (Punches)	OFN - Opatija Fight Night 2	Feb 12, 2010	2	3:36	Opatija, Croatia	
Win	2–0–1	Krisztian Gera	TKO (Punches)	SFD - Summer Fight Day	Sep 11, 2009	1		Opatija, Croatia	
Win	1–0-1	Sead Mujagić	TKO		Mar 13, 2009			Vienna, Austria	
Draw	0–0-1	Mario Valentić	Draw	OFN - Opatija Fight Night 1	Feb 19, 2009			Opatija, Croatia	MMA debut.
