= K-1 World Grand Prix 2010 in Bucharest =

Kickboxing event

- Promotion: K-1; Local Kombat
- Date: May 21, 2010
- Venue: Romexpo Dome
- City: Bucharest, Romania
- Attendance: 5,000

Event chronology
K-1 World MAX 2010 –63 kg Japan Tournament Final 16	K-1 World Grand Prix 2010 in Bucharest	K-1 World MAX 2010 World Championship Tournament Final 16 –63 kg Japan Tournament Final

K-1 World Grand Prix 2010 in Bucharest, billed as Europe's GP, was a kickboxing event held by the K-1 organization in association with the Local Kombat promotion on Friday, May 21, 2010 at the Romexpo Dome in Bucharest, Romania.

== Participants ==
=== Qualified ===
- (Estonia) Daniil Sapljoshin (K-1 World Grand Prix 2010 in Warsaw Champion)
- (Lithuania) Mindaugas Sakalauskas (K-1 World Grand Prix 2010 in Vilnius Champion)
- (Czech Republic) Roman Kleibl (K-1 ColliZion 2009 Final Tournament Champion)

=== Wild cards ===
- (Belarus) Alexey Ignashov
- (United States) Mighty Mo
- (Ukraine) Sergei Lascenko
- (Romania) Sebastian Ciobanu
- (France) Freddy Kemayo

== Background ==
The winner made the final 16. K-1 veterans Ray Sefo and Errol Zimmerman padded their resumes with superfights against Ionuț Iftimoaie and Cătălin Moroșanu, respectively.

== Results ==
Fight card
Weight class				Method	Round	Time	Notes
Heavyweight	(France) Freddy Kemayo	def.	(Romania) Sebastian Ciobanu	KO (punches)	3	2:46	Heavyweight Tournament Final
Heavyweight	(New Zealand) Ray Sefo	def.	(Romania) Ionuț Iftimoaie	Decision (unanimous)	3	3:00
Heavyweight	(Netherlands) Errol Zimmerman	def.	(Romania) Cătălin Moroșanu	TKO (referee stoppage)	1	0:26
Middleweight	(Netherlands) Halim Issaoui	def.	(United States) William Sriyapai	Decision (unanimous)	3	3:00
Heavyweight	(Belarus) Alexey Ignashov	def.	(France) Freddy Kemayo	Decision (unanimous)	3	3:00	Heavyweight Tournament Semi Final
Heavyweight	(Romania) Sebastian Ciobanu	def.	(United States) Mighty Mo	KO (kick to the throat)	1	1:24	Heavyweight Tournament Semi Final
Heavyweight	(Romania) Raul Cătinaș	def.	(United States) Carter Williams	TKO (referee stoppage/3 knockdowns)	1	1:58
Heavyweight	(France) Freddy Kemayo	def.	(Ukraine) Sergei Lascenko	Decision (split)	3	3:00	Heavyweight Tournament Quarter Final
Heavyweight	(Belarus) Alexey Ignashov	def.	(Lithuania) Mindaugas Sakalauskas	TKO (referee stoppage/3 knockdowns)	1	1:57	Heavyweight Tournament Quarter Final
Heavyweight	(United States) Mighty Mo	def.	(Czech Republic) Roman Kleibl	KO (right overhand)	3	1:56	Heavyweight Tournament Quarter Final
Heavyweight	(Romania) Sebastian Ciobanu	def.	(Estonia) Daniil Sapljoshin	KO (right hook)	1	0:47	Heavyweight Tournament Quarter Final
Heavyweight	(Croatia) Mladen Brestovac	def.	(Czech Republic) Jan Soukup	Decision (unanimous)	3	3:00	Heavyweight Tournament Reserve Bout
Light middleweight	(Romania) Mihai Barbu	def.	(France) Philippe Salmon	Decision (unanimous)	4	3:00

== Heavyweight tournament ==
Quarter-finals
(Ukraine) Sergei Lascenko	1-2
(France) Freddy Kemayo	DEC
(Belarus) Alexey Ignashov	KO
(Lithuania) Mindaugas Sakalauskas	R1.
(United States) Mighty Mo	KO
(Czech Republic) Roman Kleibl	R3.
(Romania) Sebastian Ciobanu	KO
(Estonia) Daniil Sapljoshin	R1.

Semi-finals
(France) Freddy Kemayo	0-3
(Belarus) Alexey Ignashov	DEC
(United States) Mighty Mo	R1.
(Romania) Sebastian Ciobanu	KO

Final
(France) Freddy Kemayo	KO
(Romania) Sebastian Ciobanu	R3.

== See also ==
- List of K-1 events
- List of K-1 champions
- List of male kickboxers
