= Ionuț Iftimoaie =

Romanian kickboxer

- Born: August 26, 1978 (age 48); Comănești, Romania
- Other names: Ivan Drago
- Nationality: (Romania) Romanian
- Height: 1.87 m (6 ft 1 1/2 in)
- Weight: 95 kg (209 lb; 15.0 st)
- Division: Heavyweight
- Style: Kickboxing
- Stance: Orthodox
- Trainer: Didier Le Borgne

Kickboxing record
- Total: 22
- Wins: 15
- By knockout: 6
- Losses: 6
- By knockout: 3
- Draws: 1

Other information
- Spouse: Maria Iftimoaie
- Last updated on: August 5, 2016

Ionuţ Iftimoaie (born August 26, 1978) is a retired Romanian kickboxer. Besides the K-1, Iftimoaie has fought for a number of other promotions including the Local Kombat and Superkombat Fighting Championship. He was one of Romania's most popular fighters and for his retirement fight he headlined the Superkombat World Grand Prix IV 2016 against Jorge Loren in his hometown of Comănești, Romania. The event drew a record-setting crowd of 34,000 spectators, marking the largest attendance for a kickboxing event in Europe at the time. As of 28 September 2016, he was ranked the #7 light heavyweight in the world by LiverKick.com.

== Personal life ==
He is married and has four children.

== Kickboxing career ==
Iftimoaie faced Milan Dašić at K-1 ColliZion 2010 Croatia on March 27, 2010. Dašić won the fight by a first-round knockout.

Iftimoaie was scheduled to fight the K-1 veteran Ray Sefo at K-1 World Grand Prix 2010 in Bucharest on May 21, 2010. He lost the fight by unanimous decision.

Iftimoaie was scheduled to face Dževad Poturak at SUPERKOMBAT The Pilot Show on March 18, 2011. He lost the fight by unanimous decision.

Iftimoaie was scheduled to face Luca Panto at SUPERKOMBAT World Grand Prix IV 2011 on October 15, 2011. He won the fight by unanimous decision.

Iftimoaie was scheduled to face James Wilson at SUPERKOMBAT World Grand Prix 2012 on November 10, 2012, following a year long absence from the sport. He won the fight by unanimous decision.

Iftimoaie was scheduled to challenge the reigning Superkombat and WKN Super Cruiserweight champion Jorge Loren at SUPERKOMBAT World Grand Prix IV 2016 on August 6, 2016. He won the fight by unanimous decision.

== Championships and awards ==
=== Kickboxing ===
- 2016 Combat Press Comeback Fighter of the Year
- 2016 WKN Diamond Super Cruiserweight Title
- 2016 SUPERKOMBAT Super Cruiserweight (-95 kg/209 lb) Championship (one time)
- 2005 Fight.ro Fighter of the Year
- 2005 Fight.ro Most Popular Fighter

== Kickboxing record ==
15 wins, 1 draw, 6 losses
Date	Result	Opponent	Event	Method	Round	Time	Notes
2016-08-06	Win	(Spain) Jorgen Loren	SUPERKOMBAT World Grand Prix IV 2016, Comănești, Romania	Decision (unanimous)	3	3:00	Wins the SUPERKOMBAT Super Cruiserweight Championship & the WKN Diamond Super Cruiserweight Title.
2012-11-10	Win	(United States) James Wilson	SUPERKOMBAT World Grand Prix 2012 Final Elimination, Craiova, Romania	Decision (unanimous)	3	3:00	
2011-10-15	Win	(Italy) Luca Panto	SUPERKOMBAT World Grand Prix IV 2011, Piatra Neamț, Romania	Decision (unanimous)	3	3:00	
2011-03-18	Loss	(Bosnia and Herzegovina) Dževad Poturak	SUPERKOMBAT The Pilot Show, Râmnicu Vâlcea, Romania	Decision (unanimous)	3	3:00	
2010-05-21	Loss	(New Zealand) Ray Sefo	K-1 World Grand Prix 2010 in Bucharest, Bucharest, Romania	Decision (unanimous)	3	3:00	
2010-03-27	Win	(Serbia) Milan Dašić	K-1 ColliZion 2010 Croatia, Split, Croatia	KO	1	1:15	
2007-03-02	Win	(Poland) Miroslav Kielar	Local Kombat 25, Romania	KO	2		
2006-06-02	Win	(Belarus) Sergei Gur	Local Kombat 21, Romania	Decision	3	3:00	
2006-03-10	Win	(Poland) Wojciech Jastrzębski	Local Kombat 19 "Înfruntarea titanilor", Romania	KO	1		
2005-12-18	Win	(France) Freddy Kemayo	Local Kombat 18 "Revanşa", Constanţa, Romania	Decision (split)	3	3:00	
2005-09-16	Draw	(Russia) Alexander Ustinov	Local Kombat 16 "Liga Campionilor", Cluj Napoca, Romania	Decision draw	5	3:00	
2005-04-16	Loss	(France) Freddy Kemayo	K-1 Italy 2005 Oktagon, Milan, Italy	TKO (leg injury)	1	0:21	Semi finals
2005-04-16	Win	(Switzerland) Petar Majstorovic	K-1 Italy 2005 Oktagon, Milan, Italy	Decision	3	3:00	Quarter finals.
2005-02-11	Win	(France) André Tete	Local Kombat 12, Romania	Decision	3	3:00	
2004-12-10	Win	(Croatia) Josip Bodrozic	Local Kombat 11, Romania	Decision	3	3:00	
2004-09-11	Win	(France) Stephen Réveillon	Local Kombat 9, Romania	TKO	1		
2004-06-11	Win	(Croatia) Ivica Perkovic	Local Kombat 7, Romania	Decision	3	3:00	
2004-04-24	Win	(Italy) Luca Bellora	K-1 Italy 2004, Milan, Italy	KO	1	2:45	
2003-11-29	Loss	(Netherlands) Jerrel Venetiaan	King Of The Ring 2003 Europe Grand Prix, Padua, Italy, semi finals	KO (kick)	2		
2003-11-29	Win	(France) Achille Roger	King Of The Ring 2003 Europe Grand Prix, Padua, Italy, quarter finals	TKO (2 knockdowns)	1		
2003-03-29	Loss	(Croatia) Ante Varnica	Noć Obračuna 1, Split, Croatia	KO (high kick)	2		For MTA K-1 rules European Title +95 kg.
2002-12-27	Loss	(Czech Republic) Petr Horak	K-1 Bassano 2002, Bassano del Grappa, Italy	Decision	3	3:00	

== See also ==
- List of male kickboxers
- List of K-1 events
