= Fabio Kwasi =

Dutch-Surinamese heavyweight kickboxer (born 1995)

- Born: Fabio Lucas Kwasi; December 15, 1995 (age 30); Purmerend, Netherlands
- Other names: Castello
- Height: 1.95 m (6 ft 5 in)
- Weight: 95 kg (209 lb; 15.0 st)
- Division: Heavyweight; Cruiserweight
- Style: Kickboxing
- Fighting out of: Netherlands
- Team: Mike's Gym
- Trainer: Mike Passenier

Kickboxing record
- Total: 55
- Wins: 45
- By knockout: 22
- Losses: 10
- By knockout: 3
- Draws: 0

Other information
- Notable relatives: Chico Kwasi (brother)

Fabio Kwasi (born December 15, 1995) is a Dutch-Surinamese heavyweight kickboxer. He is the 2020 OSS Fighters and the 2016 WFL heavyweight tournaments winner, the Tafneft Cup season 2018 winner, and the 2016 K-1 World GP -95kg tournament runner-up.

He was ranked in the heavyweight top ten by Combat Press from November 2016 until September 2018, as well as from July 2021 until February 2022.

== Kickboxing career ==
Fabio fought in the 2016 WFL four man heavyweight tournament. He defeated Brian Douwes by decision in the semifinals, and Sam Tevette by an extra round decision in the finals.

Kwasi took part in the 2016 K-1 Heavyweight tournament. He won decisions against Mladen Kujundžić in the quarterfinals, and Rade Opačić in the semifinals, but suffered a KO loss to Roman Kryklia in the finals.

After placing second in the K-1 tournament, Kwasi fought Ibrahim El Bouni during WFL's Almere event. El Bouni won by a third-round KO.

Kwasi faced Arkadiy Lisin in the tenth season of Tatneft Cup. He won the fight by a first-round TKO.

He fought in the WFL Heavyweight tournament, but lost to Murat Aygun in the quarterfinal bout.

Fabio won the Tatneft Arena Cup Heavyweight tournament, with a decision win against Igor Darmeshkin in the finals.

Kwasi participated in the 2020 OSS Fighters Heavyweight tournament. In the quarterfinals he defeated Buğra Erdoğan by decision. In the semifinals, he likewise defeated Clyde Brunswijk. He won the tournament final against Cristian Ristea by a third-round TKO.

== Championships and awards ==
- OSS Fighters
  - 2020 OSS Fighters Heavyweight Tournament Champion
- Tatneft Cup
  - 2018 Tatneft Cup +80 kg Champion
- K-1
  - 2016 K-1 World GP 2016 -95kg Championship Tournament Runner Up
- World Fighting League
  - 2016 WFL Heavyweight Tournament Champion
- International Sport Kickboxing Association
  - 2014 ISKA K-1 European Cruiserweight (−88.5 kg) Champion
- Brussels Kick Boxing & Muay Thai Organisation
  - 2013 BKBMO Benelux Champion -83 kg

== Professional kickboxing record ==
Kickboxing record
45 wins (22 (T)KOs), 10 losses, 0 draw
Date	Result	Opponent	Event	Location	Method	Round	Time
2023-12-02	Loss	(Germany) Andre Schmeling	Mix Fight Championship 2023	Frankfurt, Germany	TKO	2	
2023-04-29	Loss	(Serbia) Nikola Filipović	Glory 85	Rotterdam, Netherlands	Decision (Majority)	3	3:00
2023-04-21	Loss	(Slovakia) Ivan Bartek	Cerberos Fight Night 11	Nové Mesto nad Váhom, Slovakia	Decision	3	3:00
2020-02-07	Win	(Romania) Cristian Ristea	OSS Fighters 05, Tournament Final	Bucharest, Romania	TKO (referee stoppage)	3	1:30
Wins OSS Fighters 5 Heavyweight Tournament.
2020-02-07	Win	(Suriname) Clyde Brunswijk	OSS Fighters 05, Tournament Semi Final	Bucharest, Romania	Decision	3	3:00
2020-02-07	Win	(Turkey) Buğra Erdoğan	OSS Fighters 05, Tournament Quarter Final	Bucharest, Romania	Decision (unanimous)	3	3:00
2019-08-22	Win	(Italy) Claudio Istrate	OSS Fighters 04	Mamaia, Romania	TKO (retirement/hand injury)	2	0:43
2018-12-07	Win	(Russia) Igor Darmeshkin	Tatneft Cup 2018 Final	Kazan, Russia	Decision	4	3:00
Wins Tatneft Arena Cup 2018 +80kg Championship Tournament.
2018-09-22	Loss	(Turkey) Murat Aygun	WFL: Final 8, Quarter Finals	Almere, Netherlands	Decision	3	3:00
2018-08-24	Loss	(Russia) Kirill Kornilov	Tatneft Cup 2018 1/2 Finals 1st Selection	Kazan, Russia	Decision (Unanimous)	3	3:00
2018-05-31	Win	(Russia) Maksim Sazontsev	Tatneft Cup 2018 1/4 Finals	Kazan, Russia	TKO (Referee Stoppage/Left Hook)	2	
2017-12-14	Win	(Russia) Arkadiy Lisin	Tatneft Cup Final	Kazan, Russia	TKO (RTD)	1	3:00
2017-10-29	Win	(Turkey) Serkan Ozcaglayan	WFL: Manhoef vs. Bonjasky, Final 16	Almere, Netherlands	TKO	2	—N/a
2017-05-27	Loss	(Ukraine) Oleg Pryimachov	Emei Legend 19	China	doctor stoppage (cut)	2	0:40
2017-04-23	Loss	(Morocco) Ibrahim El Bouni	WFL - Champion vs. Champion, Semi Finals	Almere, Netherlands	KO	3	
2016-10-27	Loss	(Ukraine) Roman Kryklia	K-1 World GP 2016 -95kg Championship Tournament	Belgrade, Serbia	KO (Knee)	2	
For The K-1 World GP 2016 -95kg Championship Tournament.
2016-10-27	Win	(Serbia) Rade Opačić	K-1 World GP 2016 -95kg Championship Tournament	Belgrade, Serbia	Decision (Unanimous)	3	3:00
2016-10-27	Win	(Croatia) Mladen Kujundžić	K-1 World GP 2016 -95kg Championship Tournament	Belgrade, Serbia	Decision (Unanimous)	3	3:00
2016-10-15	Win	(Spain) Lorenzo Javier Jorge	Campionato Del Mundo Profesional	Santa Cruz de Tenerife, Spain	TKO (Arm Injury)	1	
2016-04-03	Win	(Netherlands) Sam Tevette	WFL: Where Heroes Meet Legends, Final	Hoofddorp, Netherlands	Extension round decision	4	3:00
Wins WFL Heavyweight Tournament.
2016-04-03	Win	(Netherlands) Brian Douwes	WFL: Where Heroes Meet Legends, Semi Finals	Hoofddorp, Netherlands	Decision	3	3:00
2016-03-26	Win	(Netherlands) Martin Terpstra	North vs the Rest VII	Leek, Netherlands	Decision (unanimous)	3	3:00
2015-11-21	Win	(Netherlands) Patrick Veenstra	Enfusion Live #34	Groningen, Netherlands	Decision	3	3:00
2015-09-25	Win	(Croatia) Mladen Kujundžić	WFL: Bosnia	Laktaši, Bosnia and Herzegovina	TKO (referee stoppage)	2	
2015-08-01	Loss	(Romania) Bogdan Stoica	SUPERKOMBAT World Grand Prix IV 2015	Mamaia, Romania	Decision (split)	3	3:00
2015-06-19	Win	(Romania) Sebastian Ciobanu	SUPERKOMBAT World Grand Prix III 2015	Constanța, Romania	Decision	3	3:00
2015-03-14	Loss	(Romania) Robert Dorin	KOK World GP 2015 in Vilnius, Semi Finals	Vilnius, Lithuania	Decision (unanimous)	3	3:00
2014-12-06	Win	(United Kingdom) Ben Vickers	Ronin	London, England	Decision	3	3:00
Wins ISKA K-1 Rules European Cruiserweight (−88.5 kg/194 lb) Championship.
2014-10-04	Win	(Germany) Enrico Rogge	Enfusion Live #21	Merseburg, Germany	KO (knee to the head)	1	1:14
2014-09-27	Win	(Morocco) Mohammed Boudadour	United Fighting League	Marrakesh, Morocco	KO	2	
2013-09-21	Win	(Netherlands) Iwan Pang	Warriors Today	Netherlands	KO	3	
Legend: Win Loss Draw/No contest Notes

== See also ==
- List of male kickboxers
