= Freddy Kemayo =

French heavyweight kickboxer (born 1982)

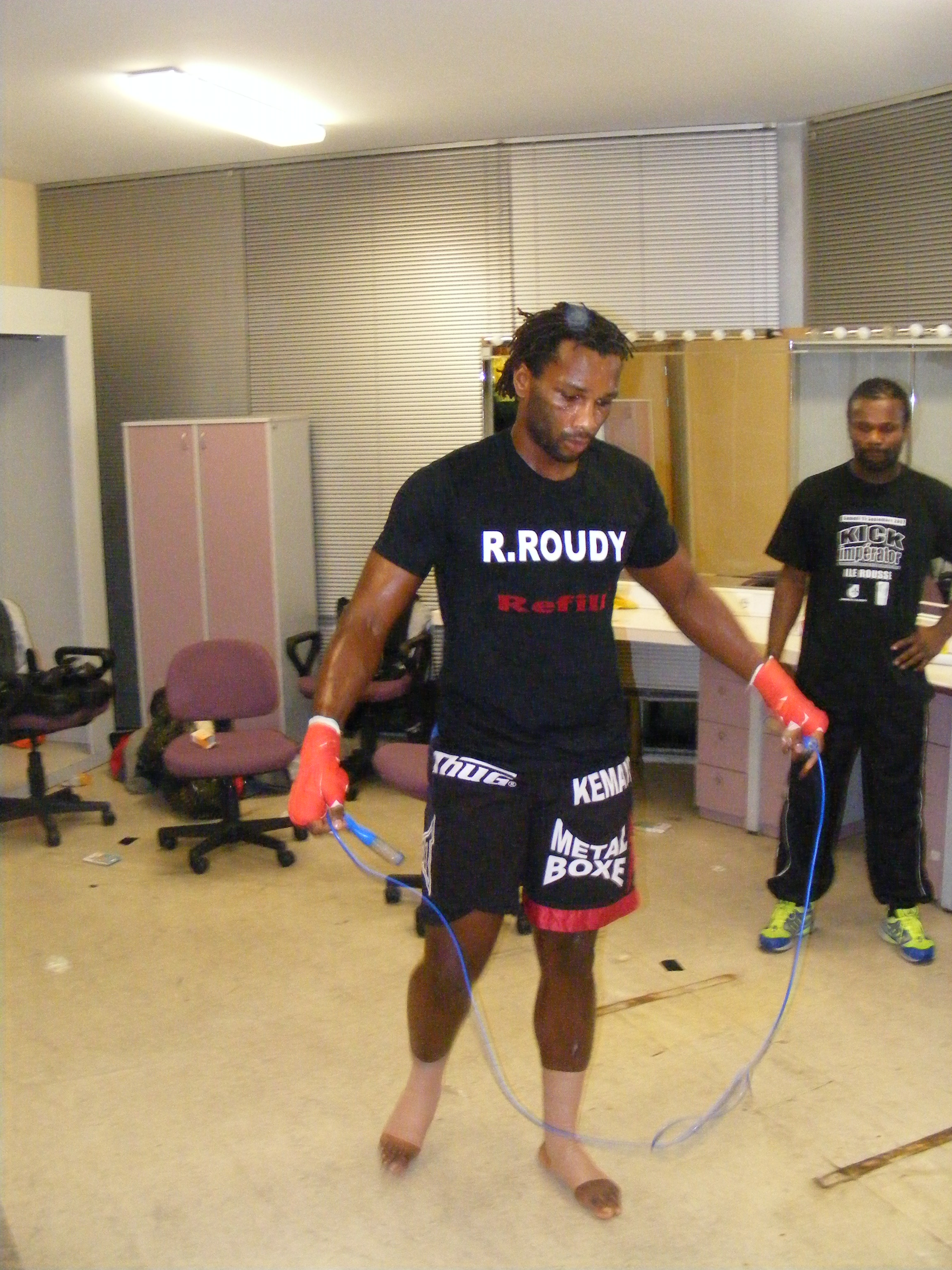
- Born: Freddy Kemayo; May 6, 1982 (age 44)
- Other names: Crazy Horse
- Nationality: French
- Height: 1.87 m (6 ft 2 in)
- Weight: 100 kg (220 lb; 15 st 10 lb)
- Division: Heavyweight
- Style: Kickboxing
- Fighting out of: Paris, France
- Team: Faucon Gym / Bingo Boxing
- Trainer: Bingo / Richard Roudy
- Years active: 2002–present

Kickboxing record
- Total: 100
- Wins: 71
- By knockout: 49
- Losses: 28
- By knockout: 13
- Draws: 1

Mixed martial arts record
- Total: 2
- Wins: 1
- By knockout: 1
- Losses: 1
- By knockout: 1
- Last updated on: June 24, 2022

Freddy Kemayo (born May 6, 1982) is a French heavyweight kickboxer. He is a three-time French Kickboxing Champion.

== Biography and career ==
Kemayo joined Faucon Gym in 1999 and has been training there under Bingo and Richard Roudy ever since. In 2002 he became the French Kickboxing Champion and in 2003 made his K-1 debut in Milan, Italy at the K-1 Preliminary Tournament.

His first success in K-1 came on April 16, 2005 at K-1 2005 Italy, when he defeated Lorenzo Borgomeo and Ionut Iftimoaie and reached the tournament finals, where he was stopped by Alexander Ustinov by unanimous decision.

On February 4, 2008 at K-1 European Qualification Kemayo knocked out Sergei Gur and qualified for K-1 World GP 2008 in Amsterdam, Netherlands.

On May 21, 2010 Kemayo fought at the K-1 World Grand Prix 2010 in Bucharest. In the first round he surprisingly beat the third tournament favourite, Sergei Lascenko in an overwhelming decision. He lost in the semi-finals to Alexey Ignashov in a slim decision but the latter damaged his shin during his fight with kemayo so Freddy replaced him in the finals. In the finals he knocked out Sebastian Ciobanu with a head kick.

However in the K-1 World Grand Prix 2010 in Seoul Final 16 he unexpectedly lost by first round TKO to Gokhan Saki after being overwhelmed by punches to the head.

He lost a unanimous decision to Pavel Zhuravlev on November 10 in Craiova, Romania at the SUPERKOMBAT World Grand Prix 2012 Final Elimination, in the tournament.

He rematched Sergei Lascenko in a tournament reserve bout at the SUPERKOMBAT World Grand Prix 2012 Final in Bucharest, Romania on December 22 and won by split decision after three tough rounds.

On April 20, 2013, Kemayo KO'd Dino Belošević in round four at FK-ONE in Paris to win the WAKO Pro World Super Heavyweight (+94.2 kg) K-1 Championship.

He was expected to face Moises Baute at FCK in Tenerife, Spain for the SUPERKOMBAT Super Cruiserweight Title eliminator, but got injured and was replaced with Igor Bugaenko.

He will fight Peter Aerts at Fight Night Saint-Tropez II in Saint-Tropez, France on August 4, 2014.

== Titles ==
- 2019 Fight Zone Heavyweight Championship
- 2015 I.S.K.A. K-1 Rules World Champion +100 kg
- 2014 FK-ONE K-1 Rules Heavyweight Tournament Champion
- 2014 WKF Kickboxing Super Heavyweight World Title +96.5 kg
- 2013 WAKO PRO K-1 super heavyweight world champion +94.2 kg
- 2011 Fight Code Dragons Tournament runner-up
- 2010 K-1 World Grand Prix 2010 in Bucharest Champion
- 2005 K-1 Italy Oktagon runner up
- 2003 French Kickboxing champion
- 2002 French Kickboxing champion
- 2002 WKA Amateur World championships (+91 kg) bronze medal
- 2001 French Kickboxing champion

== Mixed martial arts record ==
Professional record breakdown
2 matches	1 win	1 loss
By knockout	1	1

Res.	Record	Opponent	Method	Event	Date	Round	Time	Location	Notes
Loss	1–1	Mickaël Groguhe	TKO (punches)	Ares FC 11	20 January 2023	1	1:52	Paris, France	
Win	1–0	Xavier Lessou	TKO (punches)	Ares FC 5	16 April 2022	2	0:54	Paris, France	

== Kickboxing record ==
Kickboxing record
71 Wins (49 (T)KO's, 21 Decisions), 30 Losses, 1 Draw
Date	Result	Opponent	Event	Location	Method	Round	Time
2022-06-24	Loss	(Romania) Sebastian Cozmâncă	Dynamite Fighting Show 15	Buzău, Romania	Decision (Unanimous)	3	3:00
Return for his 100th career fight.
2019-06-16	Win	(Romania) Gheorghe Ioniță	Fight Zone 5	Deva, Romania	KO (punch)	1	0:31
Wins Fight Zone Heavyweight Championship.
2018-12-02	Loss	(Turkey) Tugay Erdogan	Akhmat Fight Show	Belarus	Extra Round Decision (Unanimous)	4	3:00
2018-07-05	Loss	(Romania) Cătălin Moroșanu	Dynamite Fighting Show 1	Bucharest, Romania	Decision (Unanimous)	3	3:00
2018-05-30	Loss	(Azerbaijan) Zabit Samedov	Zhara Fight Show	Moscow, Russia	Decision (Unanimous)	5	2:00
For the KOK European Heavyweight Title
2018-02-24	Loss	(Belarus) Igor Bugaenko	ACB KB 13: From Paris with war	France	Decision (Unanimous)	3	3:00
2017-06-10	Loss	(France) Zinedine Hameur-Lain	Glory 42: Paris	Paris, France	KO (right hook and head kick)	1	2:35
2017-04-29	Win	(Morocco) Imad Hadar	Glory 40: Copenhagen	Copenhagen, Denmark	TKO (punches)	2	2:21
2016-11-11	Win	(Russia) Alexander Vezhevatov	Tatneft Cup 2016 final	Kazan, Russia	Decision (unanimous)	4	3:00
2016-10-08	Win	(Czech Republic) Jan Soukup	W5 Grand Prix "Legends in Prague"	Prague, The Czech Republic	KO	3	
2016-03-12	Loss	(United States) Xavier Vigney	Glory 28: Paris	Paris, France	Decision (unanimous)	3	3:00
2015-11-28	Loss	(France) Abdarhmane Coulibaly	Venum Victory World Series 2015	Paris, France	TKO (Leg Injury)	1	
For The VVWS Heavyweight World Title.
2015-09-26	Loss	(Ukraine) Pavel Zhuravlev	KOK World GP 2015 - Heavyweight Tournament, Quarter-finals	Chișinău, Moldova	KO	3	2:59
2015-03-14	Win	(Italy) Emidio Barone	Le Duel des Maitres II	Villepinte, France	Decision	5	3:00
Wins I.S.K.A. K-1 Rules World title +100 kg.
2014-08-04	Win	(Netherlands) Peter Aerts	Fight Night Saint-Tropez II	Saint-Tropez, France	TKO (leg injury)	2	
2014-05-31	Win	(Turkey) Yuksel Ayaydin	FK-ONE, Final	Paris, France	Decision	3	3:00
Wins FK-ONE K-1 Rules Heavyweight Tournament Championship.
2014-05-31	Win	(Belgium) Matheiu Kongolo	FK-ONE, Semi-finals	Paris, France	KO (Body Shot)	2	
2014-03-01	Win	(Aruba) Marcello Adriaansz	Le Duel des Maitres	Paris, France	KO	5	
Wins WKF Kickboxing Super Heavyweight World Title +96.5 kg.
2013-12-14	Win	(France) Abdarhmane Coulibaly	Victory	Paris, France	Decision	3	3:00
2013-04-20	Win	(Croatia) Dino Belošević	FK-ONE	Paris, France	TKO (Referee stoppage)	3	
Wins vacant WAKO PRO K-1 super heavyweight world championship.
2012-12-22	Win	(Ukraine) Sergei Lascenko	SUPERKOMBAT World Grand Prix 2012 Final, Reserve Bout	Bucharest, Romania	Decision (Split)	3	3:00
2012-11-10	Loss	(Ukraine) Pavel Zhuravlev	SUPERKOMBAT WGP 2012 Final Elimination, Quarter-finals	Craiova, Romania	Decision (Unanimous)	3	3:00
2012-07-07	Loss	(Suriname) Ismael Londt	SUPERKOMBAT World Grand Prix III 2012	Varna, Bulgaria	Decision (Split)	3	3:00
For the vacant SUPERKOMBAT Heavyweight Championship.
2012-03-10	Loss	(Croatia) Igor Jurković	Cro Cop Final Fight	Zagreb, Croatia	Ext. R. Decision (Majority)	4	3:00
2011-11-26	Loss	(Belarus) Vitali Akhramenko	Fight Code: Rhinos Series, Final	Geneva, Switzerland	Decision (Unanimous)	3	3:00
For the 2011 Fight Code Rhinos Tournament title.
2011-11-26	Win	(Turkey) Yuksel Ayaydin	Fight Code: Rhinos Series, Semi-finals	Geneva, Switzerland	Decision (Unanimous)	3	3:00
2011-10-22	Win	(Croatia) Mladen Kujundžić	Fight Code: Rhinos Series, Quarter-finals	Moscow, Russia	Decision (unanimous)	3	3:00
2011-07-09	Win	(Turkey) Orhan Karalioglu	Fight Code: Rhinos Series, Final 16 (Part 2)	Istanbul, Turkey	KO (Highkick)	2	
2011-05-01	Win	(Romania) Corneliu Rus	Fight Code: Dragons Round 3	Budapest, Hungary	KO	1	
2011-03-18	Win	(Romania) Sebastian Ciobanu	SUPERKOMBAT The Pilot Show	Râmnicu Vâlcea, Romania	Ext. R Decision	4	3:00
2010-12-18	Loss	(Brazil) Anderson Silva	Fightclub presents: It's Showtime 2010	Amsterdam, Netherlands	KO (Right high kick)	1	1:17
2010-10-02	Loss	(Turkey) Gökhan Saki	K-1 World Grand Prix 2010 in Seoul Final 16	Seoul, South Korea	TKO (Referee Stoppage)	1	2:14
2010-06-04	Win	(Czech Republic) Petr Vondracek	Ring of Honor	Nitra, Slovakia	TKO (Cut)	1	
2010-05-21	Win	(Romania) Sebastian Ciobanu	K-1 World Grand Prix 2010 in Bucharest	Bucharest, Romania	KO (Righ high kick)	3	2:46
Wins K-1 World Grand Prix 2010 tournament title.
2010-05-21	Loss	(Belarus) Alexey Ignashov	K-1 World Grand Prix 2010 in Bucharest	Bucharest, Romania	Decision (Unanimous)	3	3:00
2010-05-21	Win	(Ukraine) Sergei Lascenko	K-1 World Grand Prix 2010 in Bucharest	Bucharest, Romania	Decision (Unanimous)	3	3:00
2009-11-21	Draw	(Albania) Xhavit Bajrami	K-1 Gladiators	Pristina, Kosovo	Draw	5	3:00
Bajrami retains his ISKA Heavyweight World title (+95kg).
2009-10-24	Win	(Czech Republic) Roman Kleibl	K-1 ColliZion 2009 Final Elimination	Arad, Romania	KO (Left knee strike)	2	2:59
2009-10-10	Win	(Turkey) Erhan Deniz	TK2 World MAX 2009	Aix en Provence, France	TKO (Ref. stop/broken nose)	3	
2009-06-26	Win	(Belarus) Alexey Ignashov	1st Gala International Multi-boxes à Coubertin	Paris, France	TKO (Doc Stop./leg injury)	4	2:00
2008-12-20	Win	(Germany) Stefan Leko	K-1 Fighting Network Prague 2008	Prague, Czech Republic	Ext. R Decision (Unanimous)	4	3:00
2008-11-06	Loss	(Romania) Cătălin Moroşanu	Local Kombat 31	Buzău, Romania	Decision (Unanimous)	3	3:00
2008-10-11	Win	(Hungary) János Rafiev Afimov	TK2 World MAX 2008	Aix en Provence, France	KO		
2008-09-12	Win	(Israel) Ariel Mastov	K-1 Slovakia 2008	Bratislava, Slovakia	TKO (Doctor stoppage)	1	0:41
2008-04-26	Win	(Romania) Cătălin Moroşanu	K-1 World GP 2008 in Amsterdam	Amsterdam, Netherlands	KO (Knee strike)	1	0:35
2008-03-18	Loss	(Romania) Daniel Ghiţă	Local Kombat 29	Arad, Romania	KO (Left hook)	2	2:30
2008-02-04	Win	(Belarus) Sergei Gur	K-1 World Grand Prix 2008 in Budapest	Budapest, Hungary	TKO (Low kicks)	2	2:53
2007-12-15	Win	(United States) Patrick Barry	K-1 Fighting Network 2007 Prague	Prague, Czech Republic	TKO (Doctor stoppage)	1	1:41
2007-11-02	Loss	(Germany) Karl Glyschinsky	K-1 Fighting Network Turkey 2007	Istanbul, Turkey	Decision (Majority)	3	3:00
2007-11-02	Win	(Japan) Koichi Watanabe	K-1 Fighting Network Turkey 2007	Istanbul, Turkey	TKO (Doctor stoppage)	4	1:50
2007-10-06	Win	(France) Karl Dubus	TK2 World MAX 2007	Aix en Provence, France	TKO (Corner stoppage)	4	2:00
2007-09-15	Win	(Italy) Luca Sabatini	Kick Imperator 4	L'Île-Rousse, Corsica	KO	3	
2007-05-20	Loss	(Sweden) Jörgen Kruth	K-1 Scandinavia 2007	Stockholm, Sweden	Decision (Unanimous)	3	3:00
2007-02-24	Win	(Hungary) Péter Varga	K-1 European League 2007 Hungary	Budapest, Hungary	KO	3	2:16
2006-12-16	Win	(Japan) Yusuke Fujimoto	K-1 Fighting Network Prague Round '07	Prague, Czech Republic	KO	3	2:35
2006-07-30	Loss	(Japan) Hiromi Amada	K-1 World Grand Prix 2006 in Sapporo	Sapporo, Japan	Decision (Majority)	3	3:00
2006-05-13	Loss	(Switzerland) Bjorn Bregy	K-1 World Grand Prix 2006 in Amsterdam	Amsterdam, Netherlands	KO	3	1:10
2006-02-17	Loss	(Belarus) Sergei Gur	K-1 European League 2006 in Bratislava	Bratislava, Slovakia	KO (Flying knee strike)	1	2:15
2006-01-26	Win	(Portugal) Humberto Evora	K-1 Fighting Network 2006 in Marseilles	Marseilles, France	Decision (Unanimous)	3	3:00
2005-12-16	Loss	(Romania) Ionuţ Iftimoaie	Local Kombat 18 "Revanşa"	Constanta, Romania	Decision (Split)	3	3:00
2005-08-13	Loss	(Russia) Ruslan Karaev	K-1 World Grand Prix 2005 in Las Vegas II	Las Vegas, Nevada	KO (Spinning back kick)	1	1:39
2005-05-27	Loss	(Netherlands) Semmy Schilt	K-1 World Grand Prix 2005 in Paris	Paris, France	TKO (Right kicks)	3	1:19
2005-05-27	Win	(Japan) Nobu Hayashi	K-1 World Grand Prix 2005 in Paris	Paris, France	KO	1	2:36
2005-05-06	Win	(Hungary) Tihamer Brunner	K-1 Slovakia 2005	Bratislava, Slovakia	Decision (Unanimous)	3	3:00
2005-04-16	Loss	(Russia) Alexander Ustinov	K-1 Italy 2005 Oktagon	Milan, Italy	Decision (Unanimous)	3	3:00
Fight was for K-1 Italy 2005 Oktagon tournament title.
2005-04-16	Win	(Romania) Ionuţ Iftimoaie	K-1 Italy 2005 Oktagon	Milan, Italy	TKO (Leg injury)	1	0:21
2005-04-16	Win	(Italy) Lorenzo Borgomeo	K-1 Italy 2005 Oktagon	Milan, Italy	KO (Right front kick)	3	0:44
2005-02-27	Win	(Belgium) Marc de Wit	"Les Maîtres du Ring"	Tournai, Belgium	KO	2	
2004-12-11	Loss	(Switzerland) Bjorn Bregy	Fights at the Border III	Lommel, Belgium	KO		
2004-04-24	Loss	(Belarus) Vitali Akhramenko	K-1 Italy 2004	Milan, Italy	Decision (Majority)	3	3:00
2004-04-24	Win	(Hungary) Gabor Meizster	K-1 Italy 2004	Milan, Italy	KO	2	1:25
2004-03-21	Win	(Belgium) Ahmed Jattari	Thai-Box	Tournai, Belgium	Decision	5	2:00
2003-12-13	Win	(Belgium) Ahmed Jattari	Fights at the Border II	Lommel, Belgium	Decision	3	3:00
2003-05-10	Loss	(Czech Republic) Pavel Majer	K-1 World Grand Prix 2003 Preliminary Milan	Milan, Italy	KO	3	2:27
2003-05-10	Win	(Hungary) Tibor Nagy	K-1 World Grand Prix 2003 Preliminary Milan	Milan, Italy	TKO	3	2:58
2003-03-01	Win	(France) Arnaud Bonnin	WKBC Full Contact Kickboxing	Saint-Brieuc, France			
Legend: Win Loss Draw/No contest Notes

== See also ==
- List of K-1 events
- List of K-1 champions
- List of male kickboxers
