= Romexpo =

Exhibition center in Bucharest, Romania

- Romexpo Dome; Romexpo Town
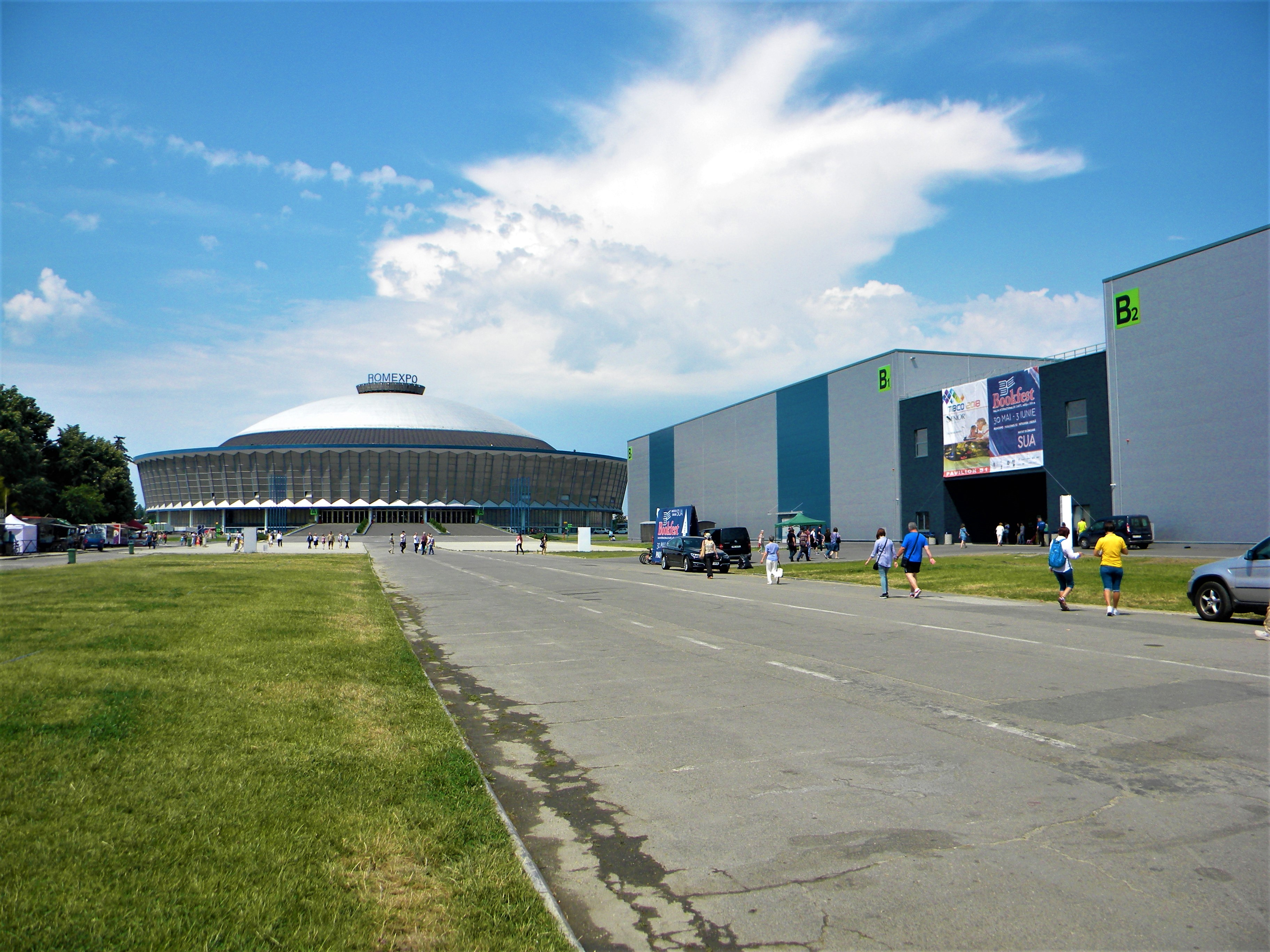
- Interactive map of Romexpo
- Address: 65-67 Mărăști Boulevard
- Location: Bucharest, Romania
- Coordinates: 44.47627°N 26.06509°E
- Operator: ROMEXPO SA
- Capacity: Volleyball: 15,000; Handball: 14,000; Boxing: 10,000 (Central Pavilion, Pavilion A); Concerts: 50,000
- Field size: 303,234 m^{2} (3,263,980 sq ft)

Construction
- Opened: 27 April 1962
- Expanded: 1994, 2002, 2016–2017
- Cost: Expansion: 2017: €16 million
- Architects: Ascanio Damian, Mircea Enescu, Vera Hariton
- Structural engineer: Dan Mateescu

Website
- www.romexpo.ro

Romexpo
- Headquarters: Romania
- Key people: Traian Caramanian
- Revenue: ▲€13.45 million (2018)
- Net income: ▲€1 million (2018)
- Total equity: ▲€41.40 million (2018)
- Owner: ROMEXPO SA
- Number of employees: 214 (2018)
- Website: www.romexpo.ro

Romexpo, also known as Romexpo Dome or Romexpo Town, is a large exhibition center and indoor arena in Bucharest, Romania. It is primarily used for exhibitions, concerts, and sporting events. The complex also hosts more than 140 other exhibits and trade shows every year. It is 303,234 square metres (3,263,980 sq ft), houses 100,000 square metres (1,100,000 sq ft) under roof, spread throughout 11 pavilions.

It is close to other Bucharest landmarks, including the Bucharest World Trade Center, City Gate Towers, and the House of the Free Press.

In 2018, it covered an exhibition area of 143,000 square meters. There were over 142,000 participants, including 3,500 exhibiting companies from 45 countries.

In September 2020, the Chamber of Deputies passed a law to hand the area over to Chamber of Commerce and Industry, allowing a private investment to develop a roughly €3 billion real estate project on the land. Iulius Group planned a gigantic complex that will include 14 new buildings with various purposes: offices, residential, hotels, commercial spaces and museums, plus 12,000 parking spaces.

== Annual international events held ==
- Bookfest, International Book Fair
- Gaudeamus, International Book Fair
- SIAB, Bucharest International Auto Show
- INDAGRA, International Agricultural Fair
- BIFE-SIM, International Furniture Fair
- TIB, Bucharest International Technical Fair
- Modexpo, International Trade Fair for Apparel, Textiles and Leather
- DENTA, International Dental Show
- ROMHOTEL
- Construct-Ambient Expo
- Expo Flowers & Garden 2020
- Romtherm
- ExpoEnergiE
- Cosmetics Beauty Hair
- Rom Enviro Tec

== Concerts ==
- Aerosmith
- Alice Cooper
- Alice in Chains
- Andrea Bocelli
- Angela Gheorghiu
- Anthrax
- David Guetta
- Deep Purple
- Def Leppard
- Dream Theater
- Enrique Iglesias
- Evanescence
- Franz Ferdinand
- Guns N' Roses
- Iron Maiden
- José Carreras
- Judas Priest
- Kiss
- Linkin Park
- Manowar
- Marilyn Manson
- Megadeth
- Metallica
- Moby
- Nightwish
- Paradise Lost
- Pink
- Rammstein
- Santana
- Scorpions
- Slayer
- Sting
- Swedish House Mafia
- The Cranberries
- The Killers
- The Prodigy
- Thirty Seconds To Mars
- Toni Braxton
- Whitesnake
- Wu-Tang Clan

== Sporting events ==
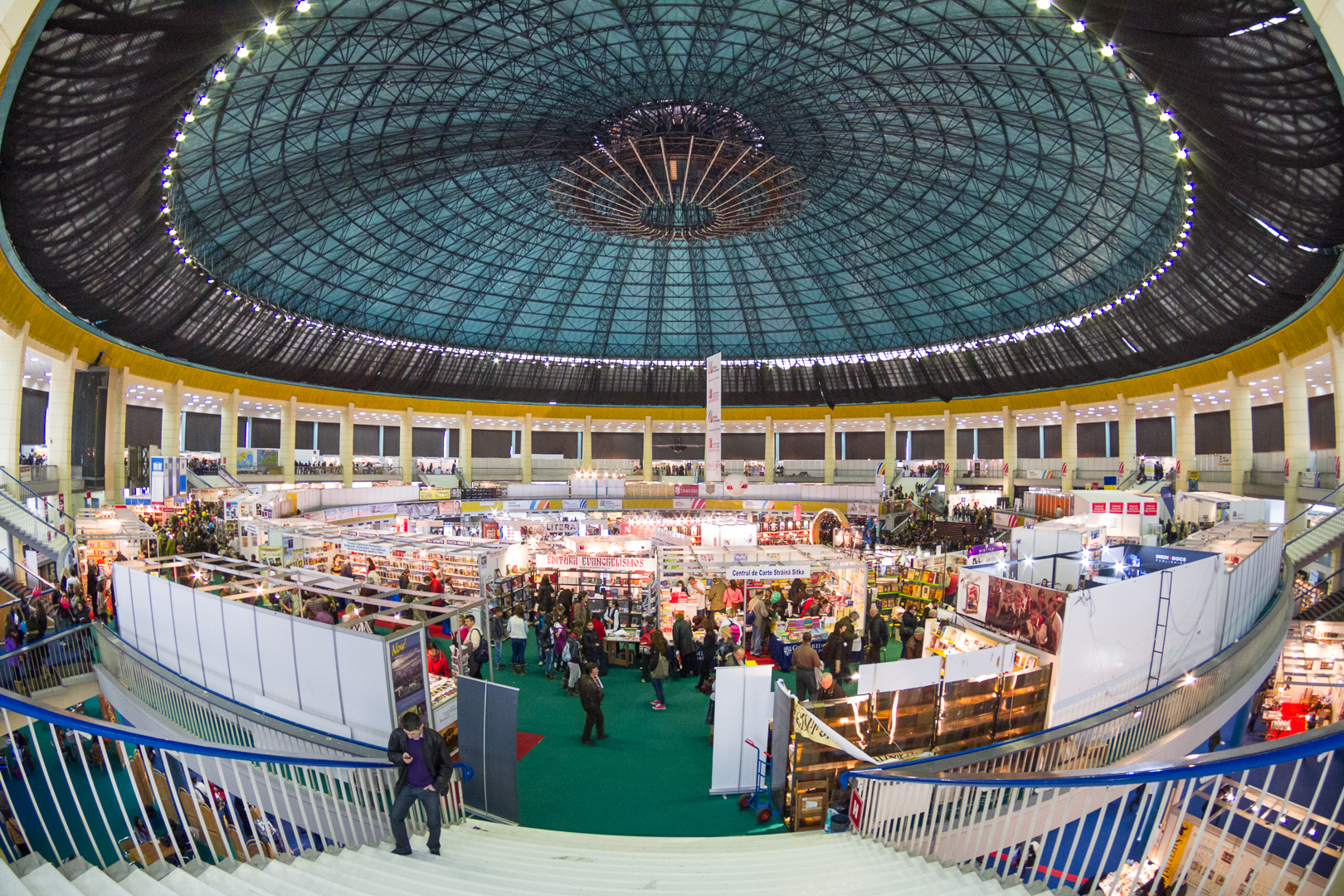
Inside Romexpo

The arena has been a frequent host of kickboxing events. Superkombat Fighting Championship has held three series events at the arena. K-1 has held their largest annual show in Europe, K-1 World Grand Prix 2010 in Bucharest, at the arena in 2010. Events at the arena include:

- Kickboxing

- K-1 World Grand Prix 2010 in Bucharest – May 21, 2010
- Superkombat World Grand Prix – May 7, 2016
- Superkombat World Grand Prix – April 7, 2017
- Superkombat New Heroes – September 17, 2017

The largest attended event this far was the boxing match between Lucian Bute and Jean-Paul Mendy of the International Boxing Federation super middleweight championship on July 9, 2011.

Apart from kickboxing and boxing, the arena can also host a variety of other sporting events (e.g., tennis, handball).

== See also ==
- List of indoor arenas in Romania
- List of indoor arenas by capacity
