= Besim Kabashi =

Kosovar-German kickboxer

- Born: 27 February 1976; Istok, SAP Kosovo, SFR Yugoslavia
- Died: 4 December 2011 (aged 35); Munich, Germany
- Nationality: Kosovo Albanians
- Height: 1.87 m (6 ft 1 1/2 in)
- Weight: 102 kg (225 lb; 16.1 st)
- Division: Light Heavyweight; Cruiserweight; Heavyweight
- Style: Kickboxing • Muay Thai
- Fighting out of: Munich, Germany
- Team: KS Steko
- Years active: 1997–2002; 2006–2011

Kickboxing record
- Total: 66
- Wins: 65
- By knockout: 60
- Losses: 1
- Draws: 0

Besim Kabashi (27 February 1976 – 4 December 2011) was a Kosovar-German kickboxer who competed in the light heavyweight, cruiserweight and heavyweight divisions. He began his training in Germany after emigrating from Kosovo and initially competed as a -79 kg/174 lb fighter before moving up through the weight classes until eventually reaching heavyweight. After stints as a German and European champion, Kabashi won the WKA World Heavyweight Muay Thai title in 2008 which he held until his death in December 2011.

== Early life ==
Kabashi was born in 1976 as the youngest of seven children to Kosovar Albanian parents near Istok, Yugoslavia, modern day Kosovo, his family belonged to the Kabashi tribe and moved to Munich, Germany at age 14. He competed in athletics, football and swimming as a youngster before he began kickboxing at age 17.

== Career ==
After successful careers in amateur boxing and kickboxing, Kabashi turned professional in 1997 and won the WKA German Light Heavyweight (-79 kg/174 lb) Championship in his debut year. The following year he won the WKA German Super Light Heavyweight (-83.2 kg/183 lb) Championship. Despite a promising start to his career, Kabashi would then retire from the sport in 2002 following a disagreement with his trainer.

Kabashi returned to the ring in 2006, weighing in at 102 kg/224 lb. His transition to heavyweight saw him have success almost immediately as he knocked out Zoran Dorcic in round two to become the WKA European Super Heavyweight (+95 kg/209 lb) Champion in 2007. He then won the WKA World Heavyweight (-95 kg/209 lb) Muay Thai belt on 13 December 2008 when he defeated Yahya Gülay by fourth round technical knockout. Kabashi defended this title seven times over the next three years against the likes of David Dancrade and Petr Vondráček before his untimely death in December 2011.

== Death ==
Kabashi was found dead in his apartment in Munich, Germany on 4 December 2011.

== Championships and awards ==
=== Kickboxing ===
- World Kickboxing Association
  - WKA German Light Heavyweight (-79 kg/174 lb) Championship
  - WKA German Super Light Heavyweight (-83.2 kg/183 lb) Championship
  - WKA European Super Heavyweight (+95 kg/209 lb) Championship
  - WKA World Heavyweight (-95 kg/209 lb) Muay Thai Championship

== Kickboxing record ==
Kickboxing record
65 wins (60 KOs), 1 loss, 0 draws
Date	Result	Opponent	Event	Location	Method	Round	Time
2011-05-28	Win	(Czech Republic) Petr Vondráček	Steko's Fight Night	Munich, Germany	TKO (punches)	4	1:27
Retains the WKA World Heavyweight (-95 kg/209 lb) Muay Thai Championship.
2010-12-04	Win	(Turkey) Mehmet Özer	Steko's Fight Night	Munich, Germany	TKO (punches)	3	1:44
Retains the WKA World Heavyweight (-95 kg/209 lb) Muay Thai Championship.
2010-09-25	Win	(Italy) Luca Panto	Steko's Fight Night	Munich, Germany	KO (punches)	1	2:07
Retains the WKA World Heavyweight (-95 kg/209 lb) Muay Thai Championship.
2010-03-20	Win	(Estonia) Andrei Manzolo	Steko's Fight Night	Munich, Germany	DQ (Manzolo could not recover from a low blow)	2	2:17
Retains the WKA World Heavyweight (-95 kg/209 lb) Muay Thai Championship.
2009-00-00	Win	(China) Li Jixiang	Steko's Fight Night	Munich, Germany	TKO (right hook)	4	3:00
Retains the WKA World Heavyweight (-95 kg/209 lb) Muay Thai Championship.
2009-00-00	Win	(Wales) John Love	Steko's Fight Night	Munich, Germany	KO (right cross)	2	0:59
Retains the WKA World Heavyweight (-95 kg/209 lb) Muay Thai Championship.
2009-00-00	Win	(France) David Dancrade	Steko's Fight Night	Munich, Germany	DQ (Dancrade struck the referee)	2	2:08
Retains the WKA World Heavyweight (-95 kg/209 lb) Muay Thai Championship.
2008-12-13	Win	(Turkey) Yahya Gülay	Steko's Fight Night	Munich, Germany	TKO (knees and punches)	4	2:27
Wins the WKA World Heavyweight (-95 kg/209 lb) Muay Thai Championship.
2008-00-00	Win	(France) Corentin Jallon	Steko's Fight Night	Munich, Germany	Decision	3	3:00
2007-09-15	Win	(Serbia) Lazar Tomić	Steko's Fight Night	Munich, Germany	Decision	3	3:00
2007-00-00	Win	(Croatia) Zoran Dorčić	Steko's Fight Night	Munich, Germany	KO (right cross)	2	
Wins the WKA European Super Heavyweight (+95 kg/209 lb) Championship.
Legend: Win Loss Draw/no contest Notes
