= Daniil Sapljoshin =

Estonian heavyweight kickboxer (born 1980)

- Born: January 1, 1980 (age 46); Tallinn, then part of Estonian SSR, Soviet Union
- Nationality: (Estonia) Estonian
- Height: 1.90 m (6 ft 3 in)
- Weight: 93.0 kg (205.0 lb; 14.64 st)
- Division: Heavyweight
- Style: Muay Thai
- Fighting out of: Tallinn, Estonia
- Team: Garant Club Tallinn

Kickboxing record
- Total: 31
- Wins: 26
- By knockout: 14
- Losses: 5
- By knockout: 3

Daniil Sapljoshin (born 1 January 1980) is an Estonian heavyweight kickboxer.

== Titles ==
- Professional
- 2010 K-1 World Grand Prix 2010 in Warsaw champion
- Amateur
- 2010 IFMA Muay Thai Riga Open winner

== Kickboxing record ==
Kickboxing record
26 Wins (14(T)KO's, 11 decisions), 5 Losses
Date	Result	Opponent	Event	Location	Method	Round	Time	Record
2010-12-19	Loss	(Russia) Turpal Tokaev	Tatneft Cup 2011 1st selection 1/8 final	Kazan, Russia	KO (Right hook)	1		26–5
2010-10-09	Win	(Latvia) Kristaps Zile	Fight Night VII	Tallinn, Estonia	Decision (Unanimous)	3	3:00	26–4
2010-09-18	Win	(Latvia) Kristaps Zile	IFMA Muythai Latvia open 2010	Riga, Latvia	Decision (Split)	4	2:00	25–4
2010-05-21	Loss	(Romania) Sebastian Ciobanu	K-1 World Grand Prix 2010 in Bucharest	Bucharest, Romania	KO	1	0:47	24–4
2010-03-28	Win	(Poland) Tomasz Sarara	K-1 World Grand Prix 2010 in Warsaw	Warsaw, Poland	TKO	1	1:34	24–3
Wins K-1 World Grand Prix 2010 in Warsaw tournament title.
2010-03-28	Win	(Lithuania) Martynas Knyzelis	K-1 World Grand Prix 2010 in Warsaw	Warsaw, Poland	TKO	1		23–3
2010-03-28	Win	(Bulgaria) Kiril Pendjurov	K-1 World Grand Prix 2010 in Warsaw	Warsaw, Poland	Decision (Split)	3	3:00	22–3
2010-02-27	Win	(Latvia) Monvids Pirsko	IFMA Muay thai Riga open 2010	Riga, Latvia	Decision (Unanimous)	4	2:00	21–3
Wins IFMA Muay thai Riga 2010 gold medal.
2010-02-27	Win	(Latvia) Igors Levickis	IFMA Muay thai Riga open 2010	Riga, Latvia	Decision (Unanimous)	4	2:00	20–3
2009-12-17	Loss	(Russia) Alexander Vezhevatov	Tatneft Cup 2010 1st selection 1/8 final	Kazan, Russia	TKO (Corner stoppage)	3		19–3
2009-11-21	Win	(Latvia) Maris Timofejevs	K-1 Europe Grand Prix 2009 in Tallinn	Tallinn, Estonia	TKO	3	2:06	19–2
Legend: Win Loss Draw/No contest Notes

== See also ==
- List of K-1 events
- List of K-1 champions
- List of male kickboxers
