= Petr Vondráček =

Czech kickboxer (born 1977)

- Born: 18 May 1977 (age 49); Rumburk, Czechoslovakia
- Nationality: Czech
- Height: 1.87 m (6 ft 1 1/2 in)
- Weight: 105 kg (231 lb; 16 st 7 lb)
- Division: Heavyweight
- Style: Kickboxing
- Fighting out of: Plzeň, Czech Republic
- Team: Lanna Gym

Kickboxing record
- Total: 84
- Wins: 55
- By knockout: 33
- Losses: 29
- Last updated on: 13 December 2012

Petr Vondráček (born 18 May 1977) is a heavyweight kickboxer. He is a former WKA World Champion.

== Biography ==
Vondráček began martial arts at the age of 14. At the instigation of his mother, he entered a school of Shotokan Karate. Then he started full-contact kickboxing training. In amateur kickboxing, he won many battles. He later became five-time champion of the Czech Republic, European Champion and World Champion in full-contact.

== Career ==
=== Kickboxing ===
In 1999, Vondráček became vice World Kickboxing Association (WKA) World Champion. He faced another Czech Dan Waciakowski but lost on points in this fight. Vondráček was chosen to be part of the eight fighters K-1 tournament in Prague but, due to a foot injury, could not take part.

In 2002, he was invited to Italy to participate in the qualifying tournament for the K-1. He made a sensational performance, winning his three fights by knockout in the tournament. This earned him the attention of the Japanese organizers and participated in several prestigious K-1 Grand Prix. At a good time, a sad chapter in his career occurred, Vondracek spent several months in prison. On his return he never found his true level and remained long without a coach. Since 2004 he has struggled to return to form.

He beat Radu Spinghel on 10 November 2012 in Craiova, Romania in a non-tournament at the SuperKombat World Grand Prix 2012 Final Elimination.

=== Lethwei ===
On 14 December 2019, Vondráček faced Slovak MMA fighter Samuel "Pirát" Krištofič under Lethwei rules in the Eurovia Arena in Bratislava. The match was declared a draw under traditional KO to win rules. His opponent Krištofič broke both his hands during the match.

== Titles ==
- 2018 WASO K-1 World Champion Title +100 kg
- 2017 WKN International Super Heavyweight Champion +96.6 kg
- 2016 WAKO Pro World K-1 Super Heavyweight Champion +94,1 kg.
- 2014 WAKO Pro World K-1 Super Heavyweight Champion +94,2 kg.
- 2002 K-1 World Grand Prix Preliminary Italy
- 2000 W.K.A. World Champion from Czech Republic
- 2000 Czech Open International Kickboxing Tournament Champion
- 1999 W.K.A. Vice-World Champion in Full Contact from Beirut, Lebanon
- 1996 Vienna Open International Kickboxing Tournament Champion
- 5 times Czech Republic Champion

== Kickboxing record ==
Kickboxing record
55 wins (33 (T)KOs), 29 losses
Date	Result	Opponent	Event	Location	Method	Round	Time
2019-03-29	Loss	(Romania) Daniel Ghiță	Colosseum Tournament 11	Bucharest, Romania	KO (left hook)	1	2:22
2018-12-29	Win	(Moldavia) Victor Mihai	Noc mistru 13	Prague, Czech Republic	TKO	2	
For WASO +100kg title
2018-04-05	Loss	(Czech Republic) Ondřej Hutník	Heroes Gate 20	Prague, Czech Republic	Decision	3	3:00
For Heroes Gate heavyweight title
2018-03-16	Loss	(Slovakia) Ivan Bartek	Simply the Best 18	Slovakia	Decision	3	3:00
2017-11-11	Win	(Germany) Jürgen Batista	Night of Warriors 2017	Liberec, Czech Republic	TKO	2	
2017-07-27	Win	(Germany) Neil Aquino	Yangames Fight Night 2017	Prague, Czech Republic	TKO	2	
Wins the WKN International Super Heavyweight Championship +96.6 kg.
2017-04-29	Win	(Poland) Wieslaw Kwasniewski	Simply the Best 14 Prague	Prague, Czech Republic	KO	1	
2016-07-28	Win	(Serbia) Sasa Polugic	Yangame´s Fight Night 2016	Czech Republic	Decision (split)	5	3:00
Wins WAKO Pro World K1 Super Heavyweight Championship +94,1 kg.
2015-05-23	Loss	(France) Nicolas Wamba	Simply the Best 4	Usti nad Labem, Czech Republic	Decision	3	3:00
For the WKN Intercontinental Oriental Rules Super Heavyweight Championship.
2014-11-15	Loss	(Greece) Stavros Grigorakakis	MS WKF K1	Prague, Czech Republic	KO (left hook)	3	
For the WKF World K1 Rules Super Heavyweight Championship +96,5 kg.
2014-07-31	Win	(France) Nicolas Vermont	Yangame's Fight Night	Prague, Czech Republic	TKO (right high kick)	2	
Wins WAKO Pro World K1 Super Heavyweight Championship +94,2 kg.
2013-12-12	Win	(France) Geatan Sautron	Noc Válečníků 7	Kladno, Czech Republic	KO (right overhand)	1	
2012-11-10	Win	(United States) Radu Spinghel	SuperKombat World Grand Prix 2012 Final Elimination, Super Fight	Craiova, Romania	Decision (unanimous)	3	3:00
2011-10-22	Loss	(France) Pacome Assi	Fight Code: Rhinos Series, Quarter Finals	Moscow, Russia	Decision (split)	3	3:00
2011-08-13	Win	(Croatia) Vjekoslav Bajic	Fight Code: Rhinos Series, Final 16 (Part 3)	Debrecen, Hungary	Decision (unanimous)	3	3:00
2011-05-28	Loss	(Albania) Besim Kabashi	Steko's Fight Night	Munich, Germany	TKO (referee stoppage)	4	1:27
Fight was for the WKA Muaythai World Heavyweight title.
2010-06-04	Loss	(France) Freddy Kemayo	Ring of Honor	Nitra, Slovakia	TKO (cut)	1	
2009-10-24	Loss	(Romania) Mihăiţă Golescu	K-1 ColliZion 2009 Final Elimination	Arad, Romania	Decision (unanimous)	3	3:00
2009-07-03	Loss	(Bosnia and Herzegovina) Dževad Poturak	K-1 ColliZion 2009 Sarajevo	Sarajevo, Bosnia and Herzegovina	Decision (unanimous)	3	3:00
2009-05-16	Loss	(Romania) Sebastian Ciobanu	K-1 ColliZion 2009 Mlada Boleslav	Mlada Boleslav, Czech Republic	Decision (unanimous)	3	3:00
2008-12-20	Win	(Netherlands) Reamon Welboren	K-1 Fighting Network Prague 2008	Prague, Czech Republic	Decision (unanimous)	3	3:00
2008-11-06	Loss	(Romania) Sebastian Ciobanu	Local Kombat 31	Buzău, Romania	Decision	3	3:00
2008-04-13	Loss	(Japan) Mitsugu Noda	K-1 World Grand Prix 2008 in Yokohama	Yokohama, Japan	KO (punch rush)	2	2:43
2008-02-09	Loss	(Hungary) Attila Karacs	K-1 World GP 2008 in Budapest	Budapest, Hungary	KO (right hook)	3	1:21
2007-11-08	Loss	(Israel) Ariel Mastov	K-1 World GP 2007 in Las Vegas	Las Vegas, Nevada, USA	KO (spinning heel kick)	3	1:52
2007-06-15	Win	(Romania) Ciprian Sora	Local Kombat 26	Iaşi, Romania	KO	1	
2007-05-04	Loss	(Bosnia and Herzegovina) Adnan Redžović	K-1 Fighting Network Romania 2007, Quarter Final	Bucharest, Romania	Decision (unanimous)	3	3:00
2007-03-02	Win	(Romania) Ciprian Sora	Local Kombat 25 "Bătaie la poarta Ardealului"	Sibiu, Romania	KO	1	
2006-12-16	Loss	(Portugal) Humberto Evora	K-1 Fighting Network Prague Round '07, Quarter Final	Prague, Czech Republic	TKO	2	
2006-05-13	Loss	(Belarus) Alexey Ignashov	K-1 World Grand Prix 2006 in Amsterdam, Quarter Final	Amsterdam, Netherlands	KO (right cross)	2	2:08
2006-04-08	Win	(England) Pelé Reid	K-1 Italy Oktagon 2006	Milan, Italy	Decision	3	3:00
2005-06-25	Loss	(Germany) James Phillips	The Fight Club Riccione 4-men tournament	Riccione, Italy	TKO (doctor stoppage)	2	2:16
2005-05-27	Loss	(Netherlands) Semmy Schilt	K-1 World Grand Prix 2005 in Paris, Quarter Final	Paris, France	KO	2	2:42
2004-06-06	Loss	(United States) Carter Williams	K-1 World Grand Prix 2004 in Nagoya	Nagoya, Japan	TKO	2	1:57
2004-03-14	Loss	(Japan) Tatsufumi Tomihira	K-1 Beast 2004 in Niigata	Niigata, Japan	Decision (unanimous)	3	3:00
2004-02-15	Win	(Japan) Nobu Hayashi	K-1 Burning 2004	Okinawa, Japan	KO	1	1:35
2002-09-22	Win	(Japan) Great Kusatsu	K-1 Andy Spirits Japan GP 2002 Final	Osaka, Japan	KO (kick)	2	1:32
2002-08-17	Loss	(France) Grégory Tony	K-1 World Grand Prix 2002 in Las Vegas, Quarter Final	Las Vegas, Nevada, USA	KO	1	2:48
2002-04-20	Win	(Hungary) Peter Varga	K-1 World Grand Prix 2002 Preliminary Italy, Final	Milan, Italy	KO	2	2:45
Wins K-1 World Grand Prix 2002 Preliminary Italy Tournament and qualifies for K-1 World Grand Prix 2002 in Las Vegas.
2002-04-20	Win	(Hungary) Gabor Meizster	K-1 World Grand Prix 2002 Preliminary Italy, Semi Final	Milan, Italy	KO	2	2:33
2002-04-20	Win	(Bosnia and Herzegovina) Souleiman	K-1 World Grand Prix 2002 Preliminary Italy, Quarter Final	Milan, Italy	KO	1	2:02
Legend: Win Loss Draw/no contest Notes

== Lethwei record ==
Lethwei record
0 wins, 0 losses, 1 draw
Date	Result	Opponent	Event	Location	Method	Round	Time
2019-04-12	Draw	(Slovenia) Samuel Krištofič	XFN Promotions	Bratislava, Slovakia	Draw	5	3:00
Legend: Win Loss Draw/no contest Notes

== See also ==
- List of K-1 events
- List of K-1 champions
- List of male kickboxers
