= Igor Mihaljević =

Croatian kickboxer

- Born: Igor Mihaljević; August 8, 1979 (age 47); Karlovac, Croatia
- Nationality: Croatian
- Height: 1.86 m (6 ft 1 in)
- Weight: 102 kg (225 lb; 16 st 1 lb)
- Division: Light heavyweight (2014-present); Heavyweight
- Style: Kickboxing
- Fighting out of: Karlovac, Croatia
- Team: cro cop team

Professional boxing record
- Total: 14
- Wins: 5
- By knockout: 2
- Losses: 9
- By knockout: 6

Kickboxing record
- Total: 43
- Wins: 20
- By knockout: 8
- Losses: 22
- By knockout: 5
- Draws: 1

Mixed martial arts record
- Total: 1
- Wins: 1
- By knockout: 1

Amateur record
- Total: 4
- Wins: 3
- Losses: 1

Other information
- Occupation: Security
- Boxing record from BoxRec
- Mixed martial arts record from Sherdog

Igor Mihaljević (born 8 August 1979) is a Croatian heavyweight kickboxer, fighting out of Karlovac.

== Biography and career ==
Mihaljević fought many top class kickboxers as Daniel Ghiță, Cătălin Moroșanu, Tyrone Spong, and his biggest win is over Gary Goodridge.

On 7 April 2012 it was announced that he would fight Gregory Tony for W.A.K.O. Pro Kickboxing world heavyweight title, he lost the fight in round 4 to numerous low kicks.

== Titles ==
=== Kickboxing ===
Amateur

- 2004 Croatian kickboxing championship (bronze)

== Mixed martial arts record ==
Professional record breakdown
1 match	1 win	0 losses
By knockout	1	0

Res.	Record	Opponent	Method	Event	Date	Round	Time	Location	Notes
Win	1–0	(Montenegro) Bojan Spalević	TKO	OB-Gula - Fight Night	Dec 8, 2007	1		Ogulin, Croatia	MMA debut.

== Boxing record ==
5 Wins (2 knockouts, 3 decisions), 9 Losses, 0 Draws
Res.	Record	Opponent	Type	Rd., Time	Date	Location	Notes
Loss	5-9	(Italy) Fabio Tuiach	TKO	1 (6),	2017-07-08	(Italy) Trieste	
Loss	5-8	(Republic of Ireland) Sean Turner	KO	2 (6),	2017-03-10	(United Kingdom) Waterfront Hall, Belfast, Northern Ireland	
Win	5-7	(Croatia) Marin Zulum	KO	2 (4),	2017-01-29	(Croatia) Sport Hall Graberje, Varazdin	
Loss	4-7	(United Kingdom) Nathan Gorman	RTD	3 (6), 3:00	2016-11-26	(United Kingdom) Motorpoint Arena, Cardiff, Wales	
Win	4-6	(Croatia) Mario Jagatić	PTS	4, 3:00	2016-11-19	(Croatia) Sport Hall Graberje, Varazdin	
Win	3-6	(United Kingdom) Tom Dallas	TKO	2 (6), 2:56	2016-10-26	(United Kingdom) Maidstone Leisure Centre, Maidstone, Kent	
Loss	2-6	(Republic of Ireland) Con Sheehan	PTS	4 (4)	2016-09-24	(United Kingdom) Tudor Grange Leisure Centre, Solihull, West Midlands	
Loss	2-5	(Hungary) Zsolt Bogdan	TKO	2 (6), 2:01	2016-04-16	(Hungary) Sportshall, Sülysáp	Mihaljevic down three-times.
Loss	2-4	(United Kingdom) David Abraham	PTS	4 (4)	2016-03-12	(United Kingdom) York Hall, Bethnal Green, London	Mihaljevic down in the 3rd round.
Loss	2-3	(Belgium) Samuel Kadje	KO	3 (6)	2015-11-01	(Belgium) Izegem, West-Vlaanderen	
Loss	2-2	(United Kingdom) AJ Carter	TKO	2 (4)	2015-09-05	(United Kingdom) York Hall, Bethnal Green, London	Mihaljevic down from a right to the head.
Win	2-1	(Croatia) Elvir Behlulovic	PTS	4 (4)	2015-08-13	(Croatia) Joker Gym, Split	
Loss	1-1	(United Kingdom) Dominic Akinlade	PTS	4 (4)	2015-07-04	(United Kingdom) York Hall, Bethnal Green, London	
Win	1-0	(Croatia) Marin Zulum	PTS	4 (4)	2015-04-08	(Croatia) Varaždin	Professional boxing debout.

== Kickboxing and Muay Thai record ==
Kickboxing & Muay Thaï Record
20 Wins (8 (T)KO's), 22 Losses, 1 Draw
Date	Result	Opponent	Event	Location	Method	Round	Time	Record
2018-5-12	Win	Mahmudin Mahić	Noć Gladijatora 2018	Karlovac	K.O	1	1:45	20-22-1
2017-09-16	Loss	(Switzerland) Enver Šljivar	W5 Legends Collide	Koper, Slovenia	Decision (Unanimous)	3	3:00	19-22-1
2017-05-20	Win	(Bosnia and Herzegovina) Zoran Radić	Noc Gladijatora	Karlovac, Croatia	Decision	3	3:00	19-21-1
2016-10-08	Win	(Croatia) Sean Šturbelj	Bilić-Erić Security Fight Night 8	Zagreb, Croatia	TKO	2	1:50	18-21-1
2016-07-28	Win	(Czech Republic) Daniel Škvor	Yangame's Fight Night 2016	Czech Republic	TKO	1		17-21-1
2015-04-29	Loss	(Ukraine) Roman Kryklia	Tatneft Cup 2015 - 1st selection 1/4 final	Kazan, Russia	KO (Knee to the Head)	2		17-20-1
2015-01-24	Win	(Serbia) Saša Polugić	Tatneft Cup 2015 - 2nd selection 1/8 final	Kazan, Russia	Ext. R. Decision (Unanimous)	4	3:00	17-19-1
2014-09-26	Loss	(Switzerland) Enver Šljivar	FFC Futures 3, Super Fight	Zagreb, Croatia	Decision (Unanimous)	3	3:00	16-19-1
2014-08-15	Loss	(Bosnia and Herzegovina) Elmir Mehić	No Limit 7	Zenica, Bosnia and Herzegovina	Decision (Unanimous)	3	3:00	16-18-1
2014-05-17	Loss	(Czech Republic) Petr Kalenda	Kings Of The Ring - Youngblood	Brno, Czech Republic	Decision (Unanimous)	3	3:00	16-17-1
2013-12-13	Loss	(Czech Republic) Tomáš Hron	FFC10: Rodriguez vs. Batzelas	Skopje, Macedonia	Decision (Unanimous)	3	3:00	16-16-1
2013-09-21	Loss	(Turkey) Yuksel Ayaydin	La Nuit des Challenges 12	Lyon, France	Decision (Unanimous)	5	3:00	16-15-1
For WMC World Muay Thai Heavyweight Championship.
2013-09-08	Loss	(Slovenia) Uroš Veličević	K-1 Open Challenger	Brežice, Slovenia	Decision (Unanimous)	3	3:00	16-14-1
2013-05-24	Win	(Slovenia) Uroš Veličević	FFC05: Rodriguez vs. Simonjič	Osijek, Croatia	Decision (Unanimous)	3	3:00	16-13-1
2013-05-10	Win	(Croatia) Ante Verunica	FFC04: Perak vs. Joni	Zadar, Croatia	Decision (Unanimous)	3	3:00	15-13-1
2013-04-07	Win	(Croatia) Mladen Kujundžić	8. Kickboxing memorijal "David Šain"	Poreč, Croatia	Decision (Unanimous)	3	3:00	14-13-1
2012-08-18	Loss	(Slovenia) Rok Štrucl	Admiral Markets Fight Night	Portorož, Slovenia	Decision	3	3:00	13-13-1
2012-04-07	Loss	(France) Gregory Tony	K1 Rules World Championship	Sainte-Maxime, Framce	TKO (Low Kicks)	4		13-12-1
For WAKO Pro World Low-Kick Rules Super Heavyweight Title +94.2 kg.
2012-02-10	Loss	(Croatia) Toni Milanović	VVVF - Veni Vidi Vici Fights	Karlovac, Croatia	Decision (Unanimous)	3	3:00	13-11-1
2011-10-21	Win	(Netherlands) Dwight Harkinson	RFC - Romanian Fight Challenge	Timișoara, Romania	Decision (Unanimous)	3	3:00	13-10-1
2011-05-14	Loss	(Suriname) Tyrone Spong	It's Showtime 2011 Lyon	Lyon, France	KO (Left Knee)	1	2:01	12-10-1
2011-03-27	Loss	(Czech Republic) Luboš Raušer	Heroe's Gate	Prague, Czech Republic	Decision	3	3:00	12-9-1
2010-10-29	Loss	(Romania) Cătălin Moroșanu	Sarajevo Fight Night II	Sarajevo, Bosnia and Herzegovina	Decision (Unanimous)	3	3:00	12-8-1
2010-04-18	Loss	(Croatia) Igor Jurković	5. Kickboxing memorijal "David Šain"	Poreč, Croatia	TKO (leg injury)	2		12-7-1
2010-02-13	Win	(Trinidad and Tobago) Gary Goodridge	Noc Scorpiona 6	Karlovac, Croatia	Decision (Unanimous)	3	3:00	12-6-1
2009-04-25	Win	(Hungary) György Mihalik	FFGP	Dubrovnik, Croatia	TKO	3		11-6-1
2009-02-28	Loss	(Romania) Daniel Ghiță	K-1 Rules Tournament 2009 in Budapest	Budapest, Hungary	KO (Low Kicks)	1	0:30	10-6-1
2008-02-06	Draw	(France) Rani Berbachi	"K-T" Kick tournament	Marseilles, France	Decision Draw	5	3:00	10-5-1
2008-09-13	Win	(Bosnia and Herzegovina) Benaid Hodžić		Solin, Croatia	KO	1		10-5
2008-06-07	Loss	(Tonga) Paula Mataele	Dunaujvaros K-1 Max	Dunaújváros, Hungary	Decision			9-5
2008-04-13	Win	(Slovenia) Jasmin Bečirović	3. Kickboxing memorijal "David Šain"	Poreč, Croatia	Decision (Split)			9-4
2008-03-21	Loss	(Hungary) Tihamer Brunner		Karlovac, Croatia	Decision			8-4
2007-11-18	Win	(Slovenia) Daniel Marhold	WFC 4	Domžale, Slovenia	Decision (Unanimous)	3	3:00	8-3
2007-09-01	Loss	(Montenegro) Goran Radonjić	Night of Thunderman 3, quarter final	Solin, Croatia	TKO	1		7-3
2007-03-18	Win	(Serbia) Radovan Obradović		Karlovac, Croatia	Decision			7-2
2006-04-29	Win	(Bosnia and Herzegovina) Mersad Murtić	Noć Gladijatora	Dubrovnik, Croatia	KO	1		6-2
2006-03-17	Win	(Croatia) Hrvoje Čokotić	Karlovac Nokaut	Karlovac, Croatia	TKO	2		5-2
2006-01-14	Loss	(Croatia) Marin Došen	Pula Sokol Fight Night	Pula, Croatia	Decision (Unanimous)			4-2
2005-12-18	Win	(Croatia) Igor Alagić	Rijeka Nokaut	Rijeka, Croatia	Decision (Split)			4-1
2005-05-07	Loss	(Croatia) Ante Lovrić	Obračun u Ringu III	Split, Croatia	Decision (Split)	3	3:00	3-1
2005-03-11	Win	(Croatia) Josip Ivanović		Karlovac, Croatia	Decision			3-0
2005-02-11	Win	(Croatia) Zvone Hundarin	Trbovlje 2	Trbovlje, Slovenia	TKO	2		2-0
2004-11-06	Win	(Slovenia) Miro Jurjevič	Trbovlje	Trbovlje, Slovenia	KO	2		1-0
Legend: Win Loss Draw/No contest Notes

== See also ==
- List of male kickboxers
- List of male mixed martial artists
