= List of current Glory fighters =

The Glory promotion was started in 2012.

This list is an up-to-date roster of those fighters currently under contract with the GLORY brand. Fighters are organized by weight class and within their weight class by their number of fights with the promotion.

== Rankings ==
Updated as of October 22, 2026.

Rank	Heavyweight	Light Heavyweight	Middleweight	Welterweight	Featherweight
(C)	(Netherlands) (Guinea) Mory Kromah	(Netherlands) (Morocco) Mohamed Touchassie	(Netherlands) (Suriname) Chico Kwasi	(Netherlands) (Suriname) Chico Kwasi	(Portugal) Miguel Trindade
1	(Croatia) Antonio Plazibat	(Morocco) Tarik Khbabez	(Suriname) Donovan Wisse		(Albania) Berjan Peposhi
2	(Serbia) Miloš Cvjetićanin	(Suriname) Donovan Wisse	(Netherlands) (Ghana) Michael Boapeah		(Morocco) (Turkey) Deniz Demirkapu
3	(Netherlands) (Nigeria) Tariq Osaro	(Netherlands) (Ghana) Michael Boapeah			
4	(Belgium) (Morocco) Anis Bouzid	(Serbia) Miloš Cvjetićanin			
5	(Belgium) (Morocco) Nidal Bchiri				
6	(Algeria) Sofian Laïdouni				

== Roster ==
=== Heavyweights (209+ Ibs, 95+ kg) ===
	Name	Nickname	Result / next fight / status	KB record	GLORY record	Last GLORY fight
(Netherlands) (Guinea)	Mory Kromah (C)	The Black Ghost	Glory Collision 10 (Arnhem) - Antonio Plazibat (*Dec. 12)	38–3–1	10–1	June 2026
(Netherlands) (Nigeria)	Tariq Osaro	Cookie	Win - Glory 109 (Rotterdam) - Errol Zimmerman	32–5–2	12–4	September 2026
(Algeria)	Sofian Laïdouni		Win - Glory 110 (Antwerp) - Karim Zeghad	43–6 (1)	11–4	October 2026
(Netherlands)	Levi Rigters	The Judge	(Oct 31, 2025) - Out of Glory Collision 8 (Arnhem) - Antonio Plazibat	30–5	11–4	October 2025
(Netherlands) (Curaçao)	Errol Zimmerman	The Bonecrusher	Loss - Glory 109 (Rotterdam) - Tariq Osaro	87–31–1	4–10	September 2026
(Netherlands) (Morocco)	Nabil Khachab	The Tank	Win - Glory 110 (Antwerp) - Ionuț Iancu	32–7–1	8–4	October 2026
(France) (Algeria)	Nordine Mahieddine	The Bear	SENSHI 34 (Varna) - Vasile Amariței (*Dec. 5)	29–17 (1)	6–6 (1)	October 2026
(Croatia)	Antonio Plazibat		Glory Collision 10 (Arnhem) - Mory Kromah (*Dec. 12)	24–5	9–2	June 2026
Netherlands Cape Verde	Nico Pereira Horta	Big Sexy	UTMA #21 (Kaunas) - Mantas Rimdeika (*Nov. 28)	27–12	4–4	April 2026
Turkey	Cihad Kepenek	The Ottoman	SENSHI 34 (Varna) - Fares Bainine (*Dec. 5)	23–9 (1)	3–5 (1)	August 2025
(Belgium) (Morocco)	Anis Bouzid	Takamura	Loss - Glory Collision 9 (Rotterdam) - Antonio Plazibat	17–5	4–3	June 2026
(Romania)	Ionuț Iancu	The Tank	Loss - Glory 110 (Antwerp) - Nabil Khachab	32–14	3–4	October 2026
Estonia	Uku Jürjendal	Estonian Thunder	(Feb 22, 2025) - arm injury - Out of Glory 99 (Rotterdam) - Nicolas Wamba	20–10	3–4	February 2025
(Serbia)	Rade Opačić	The Second Round Killer	Win - FNC 35 (Podgorica) - Alexander Soldatkin	25–8	3–2	April 2026
(Albania)	Asdren Gashi		Glory 110 (Antwerp) - Bouziane Kaddani	19–7–1	3–2	October 2026
(Netherlands) (Suriname)	Colin George	The Beast	SENSHI 34 (Varna) - Françesko Xhaja (*Dec. 5)	24–15	1–4	April 2026
(Belgium) (Morocco)	Nidal Bchiri	The Soldier	Win - Glory 110 (Antwerp) - Nordine Mahieddine	19–10	2–2	October 2026
(Russia)	Asadulla Nasipov		Win - Army of Fighters 6 (Istanbul) - Iraj Azizpour	13–3	2–2	October 2025
(France)	Nicolas Wamba	Junior	Loss - Kick's Night (Agde) - Pablo Molina	43–11	2–2	April 2025
(Netherlands)	Brian Douwes	The Hitman	Loss - Glory 99 (Rotterdam) - Bahram Rajabzadeh	42–27	0–4	April 2025
(Romania)	Cristian Ristea	The Gladiator	Win - Colosseum Tournament 51 (Bucharest) - Serdar Yiğit Eroğlu	46–29	0–4	February 2026
(Iran)	Iraj Azizpour	The Iranian Hammer	Loss - Army of Fighters 6 (Istanbul) - Asadulla Nasipov	23–10	2–1	June 2025
(Netherlands) (Turkey)	Murat Aygün	The Butcher	Loss - Glory 99 (Rotterdam) - Asadulla Nasipov	17–5 (1)	0–3 (1)	April 2025
(Netherlands) (Suriname)	Errol Koning		Loss - World Fighting League (Utrecht) - Jahfarr Wilnis	48–19	0–3	April 2026
(Albania)	Luigj Gashi		Loss - Glory 100 (Rotterdam) - Tariq Osaro	16–5	1–1	June 2025
(Italy) (Democratic Republic of the Congo)	Mike Kena		Loss - SENSHI 33 (Varna) - Pablo Molina	10–3	1–1	October 2025
(Ukraine)	Oleg Pryimachov		Loss - Glory 99 (Rotterdam) - Sofian Laïdouni	16–5–1	1–1	April 2025
(Italy) (Romania)	Yuri Farcaș		Loss - SENSHI 33 (Varna) - Iuri Fernandes	15–8–1	0–2	August 2025
(England)	Nathan Cook	The Axe	SENSHI 34 (Varna) - Dexter Suisse (*Dec. 5)	9–5	0–2	August 2025
(Belgium) (Morocco)	Bouziane Kaddani	The Atlas Lion	Win - Glory 110 (Antwerp) - Asdren Gashi	14–1	1–0	October 2026
(Turkey)	Serdar Yiğit Eroğlu	The Killer	Loss - Colosseum Tournament 51 (Bucharest) - Cristian Ristea	25–4	1–0	February 2026
(United States)	Delvin Nichols		Win - Glory Underground (Miami) - Demitri Lyman	2–2	1–0	May 2025
(Algeria)	Karim Zeghad	The Shepherd	Loss - Glory 110 (Antwerp) - Sofian Laïdouni	34–4	0–1	October 2026
(Bosnia and Herzegovina)	Ahmed Krnjić	Bosnian Steel	Loss - Glory 99 (Rotterdam) - Alin Nechita	14–4 (1)	0–1	April 2025
(Iran)	Sina Karimian	Hero	Glory Collision 10 (Arnhem) - Bahram Rajabzadeh (*Dec. 12)	16–5	0–1	April 2025
(Italy)	Samuele Pugliese	Animal	Loss - K-1 World GP -90kg Qualification in Milan (Milan) - Aaron Măcăilă	17–5	0–1	June 2025
(Romania)	Vasile Amariței	Lion Heart	SENSHI 34 (Varna) - Nordine Mahieddine (*Dec. 5)	14–5–1	0–1	February 2026
(Montenegro)	Miroslav Vujović	The Balkan Beast	Loss - Glory 99 (Rotterdam) - Colin George	11–8	0–1	April 2025
(United States)	Demitri Lyman	Action	Loss - Glory Underground (Miami) - Delvin Nichols	0–1	0–1	May 2025

=== Light Heavyweights (209 Ibs, 95 kg) ===
	Name	Nickname	Result / next fight / status	KB record	GLORY record	Last GLORY fight
(Netherlands) (Morocco)	Mohamed Touchassie (C)		Glory Collision 10 (Arnhem) - Tarik Khbabez (*Dec. 12)	23–3	7–3	June 2026
(Suriname)	Donovan Wisse		Glory Collision 10 (Arnhem) - Ștefan Lătescu (*Dec. 12)	25–3	15–3	June 2026
(Netherlands) (Ghana)	Michael Boapeah	Time Bomb	Win - Glory 110 (Antwerp) - Alin Nechita	25–8–1	13–5	October 2026
(Azerbaijan)	Bahram Rajabzadeh	The Golden Wolf	Glory Collision 10 (Arnhem) - Sina Karimian (*HW fight) (*Dec. 12)	73–7	11–7	June 2026
(Russia)	Artem Vakhitov		Loss - Glory Collision 9 (Rotterdam) - Michael Boapeah	23–8	11–4	June 2026
(Serbia)	Miloš Cvjetićanin		(Nov 17, 2026) - injury - Out of Glory Collision 10 (Arnhem) - Donovan Wisse	19–6	9–4	June 2026
(Morocco)	Tarik Khbabez	The Tank	Glory Collision 10 (Arnhem) - Mohamed Touchassie (*Dec. 12)	53–12–1	7–6	October 2025
(Netherlands) (Cape Verde)	Luis Tavares	The Infamous	Loss - Glory Collision 9 (Rotterdam) - Donovan Wisse	65–12 (1)	7–5 (1)	June 2026
(Lithuania)	Sergej Maslobojev	Kuvalda	Win - UTMA #19 (Kaunas) - Dominykas Dirkstys	45–8	7–2	June 2025
(Turkey) (Chile)	Cem Cáceres		Loss - Glory Collision 9 (Rotterdam) - Mohamed Touchassie	21–4	6–3	June 2026
(Netherlands) (Morocco)	Mohamed Amine	Momine	Glory Rivals 6 (Den Bosch) - Ali Cenik (*Nov. 28)	31–10	2–7	April 2026
(Netherlands) (Morocco)	Ibrahim El Bouni	Mister Cool	Loss - World Fighting League (Antwerp) - Yasin Güren	44–14–1	5–3	February 2025
(Romania)	Ștefan Lătescu	Golden Boy	Glory Collision 10 (Arnhem) - Donovan Wisse (*Dec. 12)	18–6	4–4	April 2026
(Romania)	Alin Nechita	The Beast	Loss - Glory 110 (Antwerp) - Michael Boapeah	21–5	3–4	October 2026
(Netherlands) (Nigeria)	Jimmy Livinus		(Aug 26, 2026) - injury - Out of Glory 109 (Rotterdam) - Beybulat Isaev	13–3–1	1–2	June 2026
(Portugal) (Cape Verde)	Iuri Fernandes		Win - UAE Warriors 73 (Cascais) - Fodiye Cissé	15–3	1–2	April 2026
(Netherlands) (Morocco)	Ismael Lazaar		Loss - Glory Collision 8 (Arnhem) - Luis Tavares	30–4–2	0–2	December 2025
(Bosnia and Herzegovina)	Albert Ugrinčić		(Oct 8, 2026) - injury - Out of Glory 110 (Antwerp) - Joshua Akingbade	12–4	1–0	April 2026
(France)	Florent Gautier	Aquaman	Win - Glory 110 (Antwerp) - Abdelilah Azzouzi	9–4	1–0	October 2026
(Turkey)	Emin Özer	The Punisher	Win - Loca Fight Club (Istanbul) - İzzet Tatarbolat	2–4	0–1	February 2026
(Italy)	Enrico Pellegrino		Win - Fight Clubbing 43 (İzmir) - Ali Takalo	30–4–1	0–1	February 2026
(Aruba)	Clayton Raven	The Golden Boy	Loss - Glory 107 (Rotterdam) - Albert Ugrinčić	16–4	0–1	April 2026
(Romania)	Sebastian Lutaniuc	Sebi	DFS 33 (Bistrița) - Dimosthenis Stampoulis (*Dec. 11)	25–12–2	0–1	April 2026
(Belgium) (Morocco)	Abdelilah Azzouzi		Loss - Glory 110 (Antwerp) - Florent Gautier	20–5–1	0–1	October 2026
(Russia)	Beybulat Isaev		(Aug 26, 2026) - Livinus pulled out - Out of Glory 109 (Rotterdam) - Jimmy Livinus	25–6	0–0	

=== Middleweights (187 Ibs, 85 kg) ===
	Name	Nickname	Result / next fight / status	KB record	GLORY record	Last GLORY fight
(Netherlands) (Suriname)	Chico Kwasi (C)	Luffy	Glory Collision 10 (Arnhem) - Mohammed Hamdi (*WW fight) (*Dec. 12)	47–6–2	8–1–2	September 2026
(Netherlands) (Turkey)	Serkan Özçağlayan		Mix Fight Championship 56 (Frankfurt) - Karoo Gijahi (*Dec. 5)	49–14	6–6	June 2026
(Germany)	Sergej Braun		Win - World Fighting League (Dortmund) - Brice Kombou	49–16	3–3	October 2025
(Morocco)	Iliass Hammouche		Loss - Glory Collision 9 (Rotterdam) - Mesud Selimović (*LHW fight)	34–10	2–4	June 2026
(Netherlands) (Morocco)	Imad Hadar	Problem Child	Win - Glory 109 (Rotterdam) - Ulrich Tiebe	22–2	2–2	September 2026
(Cameroon)	Brice Kombou	The Reaper	World Fighting League (Sunderland) - Jamie Bates (*Mar. 27)	23–8	1–3	February 2026
(Republic of Ireland) (Nigeria)	Joshua Akingbade	Bad Boy	Glory 111 (Rotterdam) - Serkan Özçağlayan (*Feb. 6)	18–1	1–0	October 2026
(North Macedonia)	Boban Ilioski		Win - Glory 110 (Antwerp) - Aimane Latifi	19–6	1–0	October 2026
(Belgium) (Nigeria)	Jente Nnamadim	The Black Diamond	(Sep 22, 2026) - injury - Out of Glory 110 (Antwerp) - Aimane Latifi	21–6	0–1	August 2024
(France) (Ivory Coast)	Ulrich Tiebe	Le Babatchai	Loss - Glory 109 (Rotterdam) - Imad Hadar	11–2	0–1	September 2026
(Spain)	Alex Fernandez	Kosovar	Mix Fight Championship 56 (Frankfurt) - Sebastian Karaj (*Dec. 5)	25–8–1	0–1	October 2026
(Netherlands) (Morocco)	Aimane Latifi	The Butcher	Loss - Glory 110 (Antwerp) - Boban Ilioski	21–5	0–1	October 2026
(Netherlands)	Regy Janssen		(Sep 28, 2026) - injury - Out of Glory 110 (Antwerp) - Joshua Akingbade	11–5	0–0	

=== Welterweights (170 Ib, 77 kg) ===
	Name	Nickname	Result / next fight / status	KB record	GLORY record	Last GLORY fight
(Netherlands) (Suriname)	Chico Kwasi (C)	Luffy	Glory Collision 10 (Arnhem) - Mohammed Hamdi (*Dec. 12)	47–6–2	8–1–2	September 2026
(Netherlands)	Robin Ciric	King of the Ring	Loss - 8TKO #28 (Heerenveen) - Chahid Hammouti	23–11	5–6	February 2025
(Curaçao)	Endy Semeleer	Bad News	Win - Glory Collision 8 (Arnhem) - Teodor Hristov	40–3	8–2	December 2025
(Netherlands)	Jay Overmeer	The Matrix	Glory Collision 10 (Arnhem) - Antonio Krajinović (*Dec. 12)	32–12	6–4	September 2026
(Netherlands) (Suriname)	Don Sno		(Sep 28, 2026) - injury - Out of Glory 110 (Antwerp) - Hamicha	7–4	5–4	September 2026
(Democratic Republic of the Congo) (Angola)	Christian Baya	Bad News	Mix Fight Championship 56 (Frankfurt) - Johannes Baas (*Dec. 5)	33–20–2	4–5	September 2026
(Bulgaria)	Teodor Hristov		Glory Collision 10 (Arnhem) - Anwar Ouled-Chaib (*Dec. 12)	20–7	5–3	September 2026
(Netherlands) (Morocco)	Hamicha	Wonderboy	Glory Collision 10 (Arnhem) - Nikola Todorović (*Dec. 12)	43–3	7–0	February 2026
(Netherlands) (Angola)	Figuereido Landman		Loss - Glory 109 (Rotterdam) - Mohammed Boutasaa	15–3	4–3	September 2026
(Netherlands) (Morocco)	Anwar Ouled-Chaib		Glory Collision 10 (Arnhem) - Teodor Hristov (*Dec. 12)	8–1	5–1	September 2026
(France) (Morocco)	Mehdi Ait El Hadj	The Talent	Loss - Glory Collision 9 (Rotterdam) - Figuereido Landman	35–6–2	4–2	June 2026
(France) (Mali)	Diaguely Camara		Loss - Glory 109 (Rotterdam) - Dmitry Menshikov	29–7–2	2–3	September 2026
(Netherlands) (Morocco)	Ismael Ouzgni	The Wave	Loss - Glory Collision 8 (Arnhem) - Figuereido Landman	4–4	1–4	December 2025
(Russia)	Dmitry Menshikov		Glory Collision 10 (Arnhem) - Fikri Sabri (*Dec. 12)	34–3 (1)	4–0	September 2026
(Spain) (Morocco)	Mohammed Hamdi		Glory Collision 10 (Arnhem) - Chico Kwasi (*Dec. 12)	23–5	3–1	September 2026
(Croatia)	Antonio Krajinović	Krajina	Glory Collision 10 (Arnhem) - Jay Overmeer (*Dec. 12)	5–1	3–1	September 2026
(Turkey)	Vedat Hödük		Loss - Glory 109 (Rotterdam) - Nikola Todorović	41–9–1	1–3	September 2026
(Netherlands) (Morocco)	Younes Smaili	Moqatil	Glory Rivals 7 (Almere) - Anouar Afakir (*Jan. 16)	25–5	2–1	May 2025
(Serbia)	Nikola Todorović		Glory Collision 10 (Arnhem) - Hamicha (*Dec. 12)	27–7	2–1	September 2026
(France)	Cédric Do	The Caledonian Fighter	Loss - Glory 107 (Rotterdam) - Mohammed Boutasaa	50–8–1	2–1	April 2026
(Netherlands) (Morocco)	Mohammed Boutasaa	Too Sharp	(Oct 16, 2026) - injury - Out of Glory Collision 10 (Arnhem)	22–3	2–0	September 2026
(Germany)	Valentin Knau		Loss - Glory 109 (Rotterdam) - Mohammed Hamdi	43–4	1–1	September 2026
(Italy)	Michael Samperi		Loss - Glory 109 (Rotterdam) - Antonio Krajinović	38–4	1–1	September 2026
(Belgium) (Morocco)	Ismail Ayaadi		Loss - Glory 98 (Rotterdam) - Don Sno	31–5–2	1–1	February 2025
(Belgium) (Morocco)	Soufian El Hammouchi		Loss - Glory 98 (Rotterdam) - Antonio Krajinović	21–7	1–1	February 2025
(Spain) (Morocco)	Fikri Sabri	Samurai	Glory Collision 10 (Arnhem) - Dmitry Menshikov (*Dec. 12)	15–2	1–0	September 2026
(Serbia)	Andrija Stankovic		Win - Glory Underground (Miami) - Gary Mack	28–4	1–0	May 2025
(Italy)	Valentino Valente		Win - Glory 110 (Antwerp) - Shefit Qose	11–3–1	1–0	October 2026
(Belgium) (Tunisia)	Hamza Bouhani		Win - Glory 110 (Antwerp) - Kenny Moukpwo	7–1	1–0	October 2026
(Spain) (Guinea-Bissau)	Calmente Mendes		Loss - Glory 98 (Rotterdam) - Hamicha	7–1	0–1	February 2025
(Morocco)	Said Kabil	Moroccan Lion	Loss - Glory 107 (Rotterdam) - Michael Samperi	16–2	0–1	April 2026
(Moldova)	Artiom Livadari		Loss - Glory 109 (Rotterdam) - Fikri Sabri	12–4	0–1	September 2026
(United States)	Gary Mack	The Silverback	Win - Freedom 42 (Philadelphia) - Kachama Hylton	23–3–1	0–1	May 2025
(Belgium) (Cameroon)	Kenny Moukpwo	Le Croque-mitaine	Loss - Glory 110 (Antwerp) - Hamza Bouhani	16–3	0–1	October 2026
(Albania)	Shefit Qose		Loss - Glory 110 (Antwerp) - Valentino Valente	53–7–1	0–1	October 2026
(Belgium)	Zino Verelst		(Oct 9, 2026) - injury - Out of Glory 110 (Antwerp) - Shefit Qose	7–2–1	0–0	

=== Featherweights (143 Ib, 65 kg) ===
	Name	Nickname	Result / next fight / status	KB record	GLORY record	Last GLORY fight
(Portugal)	Miguel Trindade (C)	El Unico	(Nov 19, 2026) - injury - Out of Glory 111 (Rotterdam) - Berjan Peposhi	22–5	7–4	October 2026
(Mexico)	Abraham Vidales	Ham	RISE World Series 2026 Tokyo Final (Tokyo) - Motoyasu (*Dec. 20)	21–6	7–5	March 2026
(Albania)	Berjan Peposhi		Glory 111 (Rotterdam) - Deniz Demirkapu (*Feb. 6)	35–8	6–6	October 2026
(Germany) (Poland)	Denis Wosik	Troublemaker	Loss - Glory Collision 8 (Arnhem) - Petchpanomrung Kiatmuu9	41–11–1	6–3	December 2025
(Turkey) (Morocco)	Deniz Demirkapu	Bad Boy	Glory 111 (Rotterdam) - Berjan Peposhi (*Feb. 6)	24–8	4–2	October 2026
(Netherlands)	Jan Kaffa	The Diamond	Glory 111 (Rotterdam) - Mohamed Hamami (*Feb. 6)	21–7	2–3	June 2025
(France) (Mali)	Bobo Sacko	Panther	Loss - Glory Collision 8 (Arnhem) - Miguel Trindade	79–9–1	3–1	December 2025
(Portugal)	André Santos		Win - Glory Collision 9 (Rotterdam) - Lounis Saing	24–3	3–1	June 2026
(Netherlands) (Morocco)	Ayoub Bourass	The Explosive	NC - Fight 4 Respect 12 (Brussels) - Mehdi Jaadouni	18–6 (1)	1–2	June 2025
(Spain)	Aitor Ibáñez	Currito	World GBC Tour 2026 (Avignon) - Eddy Nait Slimani (*N/A)	29–9–1	1–1	October 2025
(Italy) (Morocco)	Achraf Aasila	Bi Heart	Empire Fight (Bethoncourt) - Oussama Zaeim (*Dec. 19)	55–17	1–1	December 2025
(Algeria) (Cambodia)	Lounis Saing		Win - Fight Zone 2 (Nîmes) - Salif Diallo	23–6–1	0–2	June 2026
(France) (Algeria)	Imran Ben Slama	Le Sniper	T.K.R 10 (Bezons) - Jeremi Monteiro (*Dec. 12)	14–1	1–0	September 2026
(Belgium) (Morocco)	Noah Ibrahimi	Rocky	Win - Glory 110 (Antwerp) - Amine El Boujadaini	26–1–1	1–0	October 2026
(France)	Matthan Choinard	Niglo	Loss - HEAT 59 (Nagoya) - Abiral Ghimire	29–10–1	0–1	February 2025
(France) (Cape Verde)	Jeremi Monteiro		T.K.R 10 (Bezons) - Imran Ben Slama (*Dec. 12)	36–12	0–1	October 2026
(Netherlands) (Morocco)	Mohamed Hamami	The Machine Gun	Glory 111 (Rotterdam) - Jan Kaffa (*Feb. 6)	18–6	0–1	April 2026
(Spain) (Morocco)	Abdo Chahidi		Loss - Glory 109 (Rotterdam) - Imran Ben Slama	50–16	0–1	September 2026
(Belgium) (Morocco)	Amine El Boujadaini	The Gladiator	Loss - Glory 110 (Antwerp) - Noah Ibrahimi	15–5	0–1	October 2026

== See also ==
- 2026 in Glory
- List of Glory champions
- List of current Kickboxing champions
