= 2024 in Glory =

Kickboxing events

Information
- First date: March 9, 2024
- Last date: December 21, 2024

Events
- Total events: 10

Fights
- Total fights: 105
- Title fights: 9

The year 2024 was the 13th year in the history of Glory, an international kickboxing promotion.

The events are broadcast on various channels such as Videoland, Viaplay, Go3 and Pro Arena.

== Glory 2024 Awards ==
The following fighters won the GLORY Kickboxing year-end awards for 2024:

- Glory Fighter of the Year 2024: Rico Verhoeven
- Glory Fight of the Year 2024: Tarik Khbabez vs. Donegi Abena (Glory Collision 7)
- Glory Knockout of the Year 2024: Ionuț Iancu vs. Murat Aygün (Glory Light Heavyweight Grand Prix)
- Glory Newcomer of the Year 2024: Cem Cáceres
- Glory Breakout Fighter of the Year 2024: Levi Rigters

== List of events ==
#	Event Title	Date	Arena	Location
1	Glory Heavyweight Grand Prix	March 9, 2024	Gelredome	Arnhem, Netherlands
2	Glory 91	April 27, 2024	Dôme de Paris	Paris, France
3	Glory 92	May 18, 2024	RTM Stage	Rotterdam, Netherlands
4	Glory Light Heavyweight Grand Prix	June 8, 2024	Rotterdam Ahoy	Rotterdam, Netherlands
5	Glory 93	July 20, 2024	Topsportcentrum Rotterdam	Rotterdam, Netherlands
6	Glory 94	August 31, 2024	Lotto Arena	Antwerp, Belgium
7	Glory 95	September 21, 2024	Arena Zagreb	Zagreb, Croatia
8	Glory 96	October 12, 2024	RTM Stage	Rotterdam, Netherlands
9	Glory Collision 7	December 7, 2024	Gelredome	Arnhem, Netherlands
10	GLORY RISE Featherweight Grand Prix	December 21, 2024	Makuhari Messe	Chiba, Japan

== Glory Heavyweight Grand Prix ==
Glory HW Grand Prix
- Promotion: Glory
- Date: March 9, 2024
- Venue: Gelredome
- City: Arnhem, Netherlands

Glory HGP is a kickboxing event held by Glory on March 9, 2024, in Arnhem, Netherlands.

=== Background ===
The event hosted a Heavyweight Grand Prix between eight contestants, which included the reigning Glory heavyweight champion Rico Verhoeven.

Two title fights were held during the event: a Glory Lightweight Championship bout between Tyjani Beztati and Enriko Kehl, as well as a Glory Light Heavyweight Championship bout between Donegi Abena and Tarik Khbabez.

=== 2024 Glory Heavyweight Grand Prix ===
Contestants: (Nigeria) Tariq Osaro, (France) Sofian Laidouni, (Azerbaijan) Bahram Rajabzadeh, (Netherlands) Levi Rigters, (Estonia) Uku Jürjendal, (Netherlands) Rico Verhoeven (c), (Romania) Benjamin Adegbuyi, (Morocco) Nabil Khachab

Quarter-finals
(Netherlands) Levi Rigters	KO
(Estonia) Uku Jürjendal	2
(Nigeria) Tariq Osaro	3
(Azerbaijan) Bahram Rajabzadeh	UD
(Morocco) Nabil Khachab	UD
(Romania) Benjamin Adegbuyi	3
(Netherlands) Rico Verhoeven	UD
(France) Sofian Laidouni	3

Semi-finals
(Netherlands) Levi Rigters	UD
(Azerbaijan) Bahram Rajabzadeh	3
(Morocco) Nabil Khachab	3
(Netherlands) Rico Verhoeven	UD

Final
(Netherlands) Levi Rigters	2
(Netherlands) Rico Verhoeven	TKO

=== Fight Card ===
Glory HW GP
Weight Class				Method	Round	Time	Notes
Heavyweight +95 kg	(Netherlands) Rico Verhoeven	def.	(Netherlands) Levi Rigters	TKO (Four knockdowns)	2	2:59	2024 Glory Heavyweight Grand Prix Final.
Light Heavyweight 95 kg	(Morocco) Tarik Khbabez (ic)	def.	(Suriname) Donegi Abena (c)	Decision (Split)	5	3:00	For the unification of Glory Light Heavyweight Championship.
Middleweight 85 kg	(Morocco) Ilias Hammouche	def.	(Chile) Ivan Galaz	Decision (Unanimous)	3	3:00	
Heavyweight +95 kg	(Netherlands) Rico Verhoeven	def.	(Morocco) Nabil Khachab	Decision (Unanimous)	3	3:00	2024 Glory Heavyweight Grand Prix Semifinal.
Heavyweight +95 kg	(Netherlands) Levi Rigters	def.	(Azerbaijan) Bahram Rajabzadeh	Decision (Unanimous)	3	3:00	2024 Glory Heavyweight Grand Prix Semifinal.
Lightweight 70 kg	(Morocco) Tyjani Beztati (c)	def.	(Germany) Enriko Kehl	Decision (Unanimous)	5	3:00	For the Glory Lightweight Championship.
Heavyweight +95 kg	(Netherlands) Rico Verhoeven	def.	(France) Sofian Laidouni	Decision (Unanimous)	3	3:00	2024 Glory Heavyweight Grand Prix Quarterfinal.
Heavyweight +95 kg	(Morocco) Nabil Khachab	def.	(Romania) Benjamin Adegbuyi	Decision (Unanimous)	3	3:00	2024 Glory Heavyweight Grand Prix Quarterfinal.
Heavyweight +95 kg	(Azerbaijan) Bahram Rajabzadeh	def.	(Nigeria) Tariq Osaro	Decision (Unanimous)	3	3:00	2024 Glory Heavyweight Grand Prix Quarterfinal.
Heavyweight +95 kg	(Netherlands) Levi Rigters	def.	(Estonia) Uku Jürjendal	KO (Punch)	2	1:52	2024 Glory Heavyweight Grand Prix Quarterfinal.
Prelims
Heavyweight +95 kg	(Turkey) Cihad Kepenek	def.	(Poland) Michał Bławdziewicz	TKO (Two knockdowns)	2	2:55	2024 Glory Heavyweight Grand Prix Reserve bout.

== Glory 91 ==
Glory 91
- Promotion: Glory
- Date: April 27, 2024
- Venue: Dôme de Paris
- City: Paris, France

Glory 91 is a kickboxing event held by Glory on April 27, 2024, in Paris, France.

=== Background ===
A Glory Welterweight Championship bout between champion Endy Semeleer and challenger Chico Kwasi was booked for the event.

=== Fight Card ===
Glory 91
Weight Class				Method	Round	Time	Notes
Welterweight 77 kg	(Netherlands) Chico Kwasi	def.	(Curaçao) Endy Semeleer (c)	TKO (Three Knockdown Rule)	2	2:22	For the Glory Welterweight Championship.
Light Heavyweight 95 kg	(Azerbaijan) Bahram Rajabzadeh	def.	(France) Kevin Oumar	KO (Right Hook)	3	0:35	
Catchweight 72 kg	(Morocco) Youssef Boughanem	def.	(Ukraine) Stanislav Kazantsev	TKO (Shoulder Injury)	2	2:58	
Heavyweight +95 kg	(France) Sofian Laidouni	def.	(Germany) Vladimir Tok	TKO (Shoulder Injury)	1	0:42	
Light Heavyweight 95 kg	(France) Pascal Touré	def.	(Morocco) Mohamed Amine	Decision (Split)	3	3:00	Glory Light Heavyweight Grand Prix Qualifier bout
Welterweight 77 kg	(Morocco) Soufian Abdelkhalek	def.	(France) Cyril Benzaquen	Decision (Unanimous)	3	3:00	
Featherweight 65 kg	(France) Bobo Sacko	def.	(Spain) David Mejia	KO (Right Cross)	1	0:55	
Prelims
Welterweight 77 kg	(Netherlands) Robin Ciric	def.	(France) Diaguely Camara	Decision (Unanimous)	3	3:00	
Welterweight 77 kg	(France) Mehdi Ait El Hadj	def.	(Morocco) Ismail Ouzgni	Decision (Split)	3	3:00	
Middleweight 85 kg	(France) Ramy Deghir	def.	(Germany) Florian Kröger	Decision (Unanimous)	3	3:00	

== Glory 92 ==
Glory 92
- Promotion: Glory
- Date: May 18, 2024
- Venue: RTM Stage
- City: Rotterdam, Netherlands

Glory 92 is a kickboxing event held by Glory on May 18, 2024, in Rotterdam, Netherlands.

=== Background ===
A Glory Middleweight Championship bout between champion Donovan Wisse and challenger Ulric Bokeme was booked for the event.

=== Fight Card ===
Glory 92
Weight Class				Method	Round	Time	Notes
Middleweight 85 kg	(Suriname) Donovan Wisse (c)	def.	(Switzerland) Ulric Bokeme	Decision (Split)	5	3:00	For the Glory Middleweight Championship.
Heavyweight +95 kg	(Netherlands) Levi Rigters	def.	(Cape Verde) Nico Pereira Horta	Decision (Unanimous)	3	3:00	
Middleweight 85 kg	(Ghana) Michael Boapeah	def.	(Turkey) Serkan Ozcaglayan	Decision (Unanimous)	3	3:00	
Middleweight 85 kg	(Germany) Sergej Braun	def.	(Morocco) Mohamed Touchassie	Decision (Unanimous)	3	3:00	
Welterweight 77 kg	(Bulgaria) Teodor Hristov	def.	(Netherlands) Jay Overmeer	Decision (Unanimous)	3	3:00	
Featherweight 65 kg	(Germany) Denis Wosik	def.	(Netherlands) Jan Kaffa	Decision (Unanimous)	3	3:00	
Featherweight 65 kg	(Albania) Berjan Peposhi	def.	(Germany) Ahmad Chikh Mousa	Decision (Unanimous)	3	3:00	
Prelims
Light Heavyweight 95 kg	(Guinea) Mory Kromah	def.	(Belgium) Anis Bouzid	TKO (Doctor stoppage/arm injury)	1	3:00	
Welterweight 77 kg	(Suriname) Don Sno	def.	(Netherlands) Figuereido Landman	Decision (Unanimous)	3	3:00	

== Glory Light Heavyweight Grand Prix ==
Glory LHW Grand Prix
- Promotion: Glory
- Date: June 8, 2024
- Venue: Rotterdam Ahoy
- City: Rotterdam, Netherlands

Glory LHWGP is a kickboxing event held by Glory on June 8, 2024.

=== Background ===
The first-ever GLORY eight-man light heavyweight Grand Prix was held at the event.

=== 2024 Glory Light Heavyweight Grand Prix ===
Contestants: (Romania) Ștefan Lătescu, (Lithuania) Sergej Maslobojev and (Romania) Bogdan Stoica, (Morocco) Ibrahim El Bouni, (France) Pascal Touré, (Azerbaijan) Bahram Rajabzadeh, (Suriname) Donegi Abena, (Morocco) Tarik Khbabez.

Quarter-finals
(Morocco) Tarik Khbabez	UD
(France) Pascal Touré	3
(Romania) Ștefan Lătescu	3
(Suriname) Donegi Abena	TKO
(Lithuania) Sergej Maslobojev	TKO
(Romania) Bogdan Stoica	1
(Azerbaijan) Bahram Rajabzadeh	KO
(Morocco) Ibrahim El Bouni	1

Semi-finals
(Morocco) Tarik Khbabez	1
(Suriname) Donegi Abena	KO
(Lithuania) Sergej Maslobojev	2
(Azerbaijan) Bahram Rajabzadeh	TKO

Final
(Suriname) Donegi Abena	TKO
(Azerbaijan) Bahram Rajabzadeh	1

=== Fight Card ===
Glory LHW GP
Weight Class				Method	Round	Time	Notes
Light Heavyweight 95 kg	(Suriname) Donegi Abena	def.	(Azerbaijan) Bahram Rajabzadeh	TKO (referee stop./punches)	1	2:43	2024 Glory Light Heavyweight Grand Prix Final.
Heavyweight +95 kg	(Romania) Ionuț Iancu	def.	(Turkey) Murat Aygün	KO (Left hook)	2	1:43	
Middleweight 85 kg	(France) Ramy Deghir	def.	(Cameroon) Brice Kombou	Decision (Split)	3	3:00	
Light Heavyweight 95 kg	(Azerbaijan) Bahram Rajabzadeh	def.	(Lithuania) Sergej Maslobojev	TKO (retirement)	2	0:20	2024 Glory Light Heavyweight Grand Prix Semifinal.
Light Heavyweight 95 kg	(Suriname) Donegi Abena	def.	(Morocco) Tarik Khbabez	KO (Low kick)	2	0:30	2024 Glory Light Heavyweight Grand Prix Semifinal.
Light Heavyweight 95 kg	(Azerbaijan) Bahram Rajabzadeh	def.	(Morocco) Ibrahim El Bouni	TKO (Flying knee)	1	2:02	2024 Glory Light Heavyweight Grand Prix Quarterfinal.
Light Heavyweight 95 kg	(Lithuania) Sergej Maslobojev	def.	(Romania) Bogdan Stoica	TKO (arm injury)	1	1:05	2024 Glory Light Heavyweight Grand Prix Quarterfinal.
Light Heavyweight 95 kg	(Suriname) Donegi Abena	def.	(Romania) Ștefan Lătescu	TKO (Low kicks)	3	0:59	2024 Glory Light Heavyweight Grand Prix Quarterfinal.
Light Heavyweight 95 kg	(Morocco) Tarik Khbabez	def.	(France) Pascal Touré	Decision (Unanimous)	3	3:00	2024 Glory Light Heavyweight Grand Prix Quarterfinal.
Prelims
Welterweight 77 kg	(Morocco) Soufian Abdelkhalek	def.	(Morocco) Ilyass Chakir	Decision (Unanimous)	3	3:00	
Light Heavyweight 95 kg	(Turkey) Cem Caceres	def.	(Morocco) Mohamed Amine	TKO (Left hook)	2	1:32	2024 Glory Light Heavyweight Grand Prix Reserve bout.

== Glory 93 ==
Glory 93
- Promotion: Glory
- Date: July 20, 2024
- Venue: Topsportcentrum Rotterdam
- City: Rotterdam, Netherlands

Glory 93 is a kickboxing event held by Glory on July 20, 2024.

=== Background ===
A welterweight bout between Glory Lightweight champion Tyjani Beztati and the former Glory Welterweight champion Endy Semeleer was scheduled as the main event, while a Glory Featherweight Championship bout between champion Petpanomrung Kiatmuu9 and challenger Kento Haraguchi served as the co-main event.

=== Fight Card ===
Glory 93
Weight Class				Method	Round	Time	Notes
Welterweight 77 kg	(Morocco) Tyjani Beztati	def.	(Curaçao) Endy Semeleer	Decision (Unanimous)	3	3:00	
Featherweight 65 kg	(Thailand) Petpanomrung Kiatmuu9 (c)	def.	(Japan) Kento Haraguchi	Decision (Unanimous)	5	3:00	For the Glory Featherweight Championship
Middleweight 85 kg	(Ghana) Michael Boapeah	def.	(Switzerland) Ulric Bokeme	Decision (Unanimous)	3	3:00	
Catchweight 73.5 kg	(Turkey) Tayfun Ozcan	def.	(France) Majid Amarouche	Decision (Unanimous)	3	3:00	
Featherweight 65 kg	(Portugal) Miguel Trindade	def.	(Mexico) Abraham Vidales	Decision (Unanimous)	3	3:00	
Welterweight 77 kg	(Netherlands) Robin Ciric	def.	(Serbia) Nikola Todorović	Decision (Unanimous)	3	3:00	
Prelims
Welterweight 77 kg	(Morocco) Mehdi Ait El Hadj	def.	(Suriname) Don Sno	Decision (Unanimous)	3	3:00	
Middleweight 85 kg	(France) Frangis Goma	def.	(Portugal) Juri De Sousa	Decision (Split)	3	3:00	
Heavyweight +95 kg	(Albania) Asdren Gashi	def.	(Ivory Coast) Fabrice Gnedre	TKO (3 Knockdowns)	1	2:54	

== Glory 94 ==
Glory 94
- Promotion: Glory
- Date: August 31, 2024
- Venue: Lotto Arena
- City: Antwerp, Belgium

Glory 94 is a kickboxing event held by Glory on August 31, 2024, in Antwerp, Belgium.

=== Background ===
A light-heavyweight bout between Ștefan Lătescu and Bahram Rajabzadeh was booked as the event headliner.

=== Fight Card ===
Glory 94
Weight Class				Method	Round	Time	Notes
Light Heavyweight 95 kg	(Turkey) Cem Cáceres	def.	(Romania) Ștefan Lătescu	KO (Left hook to the body)	1	2:08	
Featherweight 65 kg	(Albania) Berjan Peposhi	def.	(Morocco) Ayoub Bourass	Decision (Unanimous)	3	3:00	
Catchweight 72 kg	(Italy) Angelo Volpe	def.	(Morocco) Youssef Boughanem	Decision (Split)	3	3:00	
Middleweight +85 kg	(Turkey) Serkan Özçağlayan	def.	(Belgium) Jente Nnamadim	Decision (Unanimous)	3	3:00	
Heavyweight +95 kg	(Cape Verde) Nico Pereira Horta	def.	(France) Sofian Laidouni	Decision (Unanimous)	3	3:00	
Welterweight 77 kg	(Netherlands) Jay Overmeer	def.	(Morocco) Ismail Ouzgni	TKO (retirement/injury)	2	1:18	
Light Heavyweight 95 kg	(Guinea) Mory Kromah	def.	(Morocco) Mohamed Amine	KO (Flying knee)	2	2:59	
Catchweight 74.6 kg	(Morocco) Younès Smaili	def.	(France) James Condé	Decision (Unanimous)	3	3:00	Smaili missed the contracted weight of 73kg by 1.6kg
Prelims
Welterweight 77 kg	(Morocco) Anwar Ouled-Chahib	def.	(France) Cédric Tousch	Decision (Unanimous)	3	3:00	
Featherweight 65 kg	(Portugal) André Santos	def.	(Morocco) Adam El Hammouchi	KO (Left hook)	2	1:59	
Middleweight 85 kg	(Belgium) Karim Taquet	def.	(Belgium) Madani Rahmani	TKO (Ankle injury)	1	1:35	
Lightweight 70 kg	(Morocco) Soufian El Hammouchi	def.	(Armenia) Arman Hambaryan	TKO (Corner stoppage)	3	2:38	
Welterweight 77 kg	(Morocco) Ismail Ayaadi	def.	(Morocco) Abdellah Oussaid	TKO (Four knockdowns)	2	2:45	

== Glory 95 ==
Glory 95
- Promotion: Glory
- Date: September 21, 2024
- Venue: Arena Zagreb
- City: Zagreb, Croatia

Glory 95 is a kickboxing event held by Glory on September 21, 2024.

=== Background ===
A heavyweight bout between Antonio Plazibat and Levi Rigters was scheduled as the main event. Plazibat withdrew with an injury on August 19 and was replaced by Bahram Rajabzadeh.

=== Fight Card ===
Glory 95
Weight Class				Method	Round	Time	Notes
Heavyweight +95 kg	(Netherlands) Levi Rigters	def.	(Azerbaijan) Bahram Rajabzadeh	TKO (Doctor stoppage)	3	2:23	Glory Heavyweight title eliminator.
Heavyweight +95 kg	(Nigeria) Tariq Osaro	def.	(Cape Verde) Nico Pereira Horta	Decision (Unanimous)	3	3:00	
Heavyweight +95 kg	(Croatia) Mladen Brestovac	def.	(France) Karim Dian	KO (Left body kick)	1	1:13	
Heavyweight +95 kg	(France) Nordine Mahieddine	def.	(Serbia) Nikola Filipovic	Decision (Split)	3	3:00	
Welterweight 77 kg	(Turkey) Vedat Hoduk	def.	(Bosnia and Herzegovina) Arian Sadiković	Ext.R Decision (Split)	4	3:00	
Lightweight 70 kg	(Croatia) Andrej Kedveš	def.	(France) Guerric Billet	TKO (3 Knockdowns)	3	1:42	
Light Heavyweight 95 kg	(Serbia) Miloš Cvjetićanin	def.	(Netherlands) Jimmy Livinus	KO (Right hook)	1	2:29	
Prelims
Welterweight 77 kg	(France) Cédric Do	def.	(Croatia) Filip Matić	TKO (Corner stoppage)	2	1:24	
Light Heavyweight 95 kg	(Croatia) Ivan Bertić	def.	(Romania) Dănuț Hurduc	Decision (Unanimous)	3	3:00	
Middleweight 85 kg	(Croatia) Vito Košar	def.	(Serbia) Aleksandar Janković	TKO (Three knockdowns)	1	2:00	
Welterweight 77 kg	(Croatia) Antonio Krajinović	def.	(Croatia) Teo Mikelić	TKO (Corner stoppage)	1	0:57	

== Glory 96 ==
Glory 96
- Promotion: Glory
- Date: October 12, 2024
- Venue: RTM Stage
- City: Rotterdam, Netherlands

Glory 96 is a kickboxing event held by Glory on October 12, 2024, in Rotterdam, Netherlands.

=== Background ===
A Glory Welterweight championship bout between champion Chico Kwasi and GLORY Lightweight champion Tyjani Beztati served as the main event.

=== Fight Card ===
Glory 96
Weight Class				Method	Round	Time	Notes
Welterweight 77 kg	(Netherlands) Chico Kwasi (c)	draw.	(Morocco) Tyjani Beztati	Decision (Split)	5	3:00	For the Glory Welterweight Championship.
Middleweight 85 kg	(Suriname) Donovan Wisse (c)	def.	(Germany) Sergej Braun	Decision (Unanimous)	5	3:00	For the Glory Middleweight Championship.
Heavyweight +95 kg	(Morocco) Nabil Khachab	def.	(Turkey) Buğra Erdoğan	Decision (Unanimous)	3	3:00	
Middleweight 85 kg	(Ghana) Michael Boapeah	def.	(Morocco) Mohamed Touchassie	Decision (Unanimous)	3	3:00	
Middleweight 85 kg	(Montenegro) Mihailo Ćulafić	def.	(Morocco) Ilias Hammouche	Decision (Unanimous)	3	3:00	
Featherweight 65 kg	(France) Bobo Sacko	def.	(Germany) Denis Wosik	Ext.R Decision (Split)	4	3:00	
Heavyweight 95+ kg	(Romania) Ionuț Iancu	def.	(Turkey) Cihad Kepenek	TKO (3 Knockdowns)	2	2:59	
Prelims
Light Heavyweight 95 kg	(Morocco) Ibrahim El Bouni	def.	(Romania) Bogdan Stoica	Ext.R Decision (Unanimous)	4	3:00	
Welterweight 77 kg	(Bulgaria) Teodor Hristov	def.	(Netherlands) Robin Ciric	Ext.R Decision (Unanimous)	4	3:00	
Heavyweight 95+ kg	(Belgium) Asdren Gashi	def.	(Suriname) Colin George	Decision (Unanimous)	3	3:00	
Welterweight 77 kg	(Morocco) Mehdi Ait El Hadj	def.	(Morocco) Soufiane Abdelkhalek	Decision (Split)	3	3:00	

== Glory Collision 7 ==
Glory Collision 7
- Promotion: Glory
- Date: December 7, 2024
- Venue: Gelredome
- City: Arnhem, Netherlands
- Attendance: 20,000

Glory Collision 7 is a kickboxing event held by Glory on December 7, 2024, in Arnhem, Netherlands.

=== Fight Card ===
Glory Collision 7
Weight Class				Method	Round	Time	Notes
Heavyweight +95 kg	(Netherlands) Rico Verhoeven (c)	def.	(Netherlands) Levi Rigters	Decision (Unanimous)	5	3:00	For the Glory Heavyweight Championship.
Light Heavyweight 95 kg	(Morocco) Tarik Khbabez (c)	def.	(Suriname) Donegi Abena	Decision (Split)	5	3:00	For the Glory Light Heavyweight Championship.
Light Heavyweight 95 kg	(Azerbaijan) Bahram Rajabzadeh	def.	(North Macedonia) Daniel Stefanovski	TKO (3 Knockdowns)	1	2:30	
Light Heavyweight 95 kg	(Lithuania) Sergej Maslobojev	def.	(Romania) Ștefan Lătescu	Decision (Unanimous)	3	3:00	
Light Heavyweight 95 kg	(Turkey) Cem Cáceres	def.	(France) Pascal Touré	Decision (Unanimous)	3	3:00	
Heavyweight +95 kg	(France) Sofian Laïdouni	def.	(Romania) Ionuț Iancu	Decision (Unanimous)	3	3:00	
Light Heavyweight 95 kg	(Guinea) Mory Kromah	def.	(Serbia) Miloš Cvjetićanin	Decision (Unanimous)	3	3:00	
Prelims
Catchweight 75 kg	(Morocco) Younes Smaili	def.	(Turkey) Tayfun Özcan	Decision (Split)	3	3:00	
Middleweight 85 kg	(Turkey) Serkan Özçağlayan	def.	(France) Ramy Deghir	Decision (Unanimous)	3	3:00	
Welterweight 77 kg	(Curaçao) Endy Semeleer	def.	(Netherlands) Jay Overmeer	Decision (Unanimous)	3	3:00	
Heavyweight +95 kg	(Ukraine) Oleg Pryimachov	def.	(Morocco) Abderrahman Barkouch	Decision (Unanimous)	3	3:00	
Featherweight 65 kg	(Morocco) Ayoub Bourrass	def.	(Morocco) Anass Ahmidouch-Fatah	Decision (Split)	3	3:00	

== GLORY RISE Featherweight Grand Prix ==
GLORY RISE Featherweight Grand Prix
- Promotion: GLORY; RISE
- Date: December 21, 2024
- Venue: Makuhari Messe
- City: Chiba, Japan

GLORY RISE Featherweight Grand Prix or Glory 97 was a kickboxing event that was held by RISE in collaboration with Glory, on December 21, 2024, at the Makuhari Messe in Chiba, Japan.

=== 2024 GLORY RISE Featherweight Grand Prix ===
Contestants: (Portugal) Miguel Trindade, (Japan) Kento Haraguchi, (Thailand) Petpanomrung Kiatmuu9, (Australia) Chadd Collins, (Albania) Berjan Peposhi, (Japan) Taiju Shiratori, (South Korea) Lee Sung-hyun, (Mexico) Abraham Vidales.

Quarter-finals
(Japan) Taiju Shiratori	3
(Thailand) Petpanomrung Kiatmuu9	UD
(South Korea) Lee Sung-hyun	MD
(Albania) Berjan Peposhi	3
(Australia) Chadd Collins	UD
(Mexico) Abraham Vidales	3
(Japan) Kento Haraguchi	1
(Portugal) Miguel Trindade	KO

Semi-finals
(Thailand) Petpanomrung Kiatmuu9	UD
(South Korea) Lee Sung-hyun	3
(Australia) Chadd Collins	1
(Portugal) Miguel Trindade	TKO

Final
(Thailand) Petpanomrung Kiatmuu9	SD
(Portugal) Miguel Trindade	3

=== Fight Card ===
GLORY RISE Featherweight Grand Prix / GLORY 97
Weight Class				Method	Round	Time	Notes
Featherweight 65 kg	(Thailand) Petpanomrung Kiatmuu9	def.	(Portugal) Miguel Trindade	Decision (Split)	3	3:00	GLORY RISE Featherweight Grand Prix Final
67.5 kg	(Canada) Meison Hide Usami	def.	(Japan) Takumi Sanekata	Decision (Unanimous)	5	3:00	for the vacant RISE Welterweight title
Super Flyweight 53 kg	(Japan) Ryujin Nasukawa	def.	(Thailand) Petmai MC.SuperlekMuaythai	KO (Knee to the body)	2		
Featherweight 65 kg	(Portugal) Miguel Trindade	def.	(Australia) Chadd Collins	TKO (2 Knockdowns)	1	1:02	GLORY RISE Featherweight Grand Prix Semifinal
Featherweight 65 kg	(Thailand) Petpanomrung Kiatmuu9	def.	(South Korea) Lee Sung-hyun	Decision (Unanimous)	3	3:00	GLORY RISE Featherweight Grand Prix Semifinal
Super Flyweight 53 kg	(Japan) Kazuki Osaki	def.	(Spain) Albert Campos	Decision (Unanimous)	3	3:00	
Catchweight 61.5 kg	(Thailand) Panuwat TGT	def.	(South Korea) Chan Hyung Lee	Ext.R Decision (Split)	4	3:00	
Featherweight 65 kg	(Portugal) Miguel Trindade	def.	(Japan) Kento Haraguchi	KO (Right cross)	1	2:59	GLORY RISE Featherweight Grand Prix Quarterfinals
Featherweight 65 kg	(Australia) Chadd Collins	def.	(Mexico) Abraham Vidales	Decision (Unanimous)	3	3:00	GLORY RISE Featherweight Grand Prix Quarterfinals
Featherweight 65 kg	(South Korea) Lee Sung-hyun	def.	(Albania) Berjan Peposhi	Decision (Majority)	3	3:00	GLORY RISE Featherweight Grand Prix Quarterfinals
Featherweight 65 kg	(Thailand) Petpanomrung Kiatmuu9	def.	(Japan) Taiju Shiratori	Decision (Unanimous)	3	3:00	GLORY RISE Featherweight Grand Prix Quarterfinals
Featherweight 65 kg	(Japan) Yutaro Asahi	def.	(Netherlands) Jan Kaffa	TKO (2 Knockdowns rule)	3	2	GLORY RISE Featherweight Grand Prix reserve
Catchweight 56 kg	(Japan) Keisuke Monguchi	def.	(Thailand) Auto Nor.Naksin	Decision (Majority)	3	3:00	
Bantamweight 55 kg	(Japan) Masahiko Suzuki	def.	(Philippines) Jhaymie Gayman	KO (Right cross)	1	1:26	
Catchweight 54 kg	(Japan) Musashi Matsushita	def.	(Philippines) Jan-Jan C.Labuayan	KO (Body punch)	3	2:42	
Women's Flyweight 52 kg	(Japan) KOKOZ	def.	(Japan) Yaya Weerasakreck	Decision (Split)	3	3:00	

== See also ==
- List of current GLORY fighters
- 2024 in ONE Championship
- 2024 in K-1
- 2024 in RISE
- 2024 in Romanian kickboxing
- 2024 in Wu Lin Feng
