= Eduard Aleksanyan =

Bulgarian kickboxer

- Born: Едуард Алексанян; June 9, 1997 (age 29); Varna, Bulgaria
- Other names: Mr. Action
- Nationality: Bulgarian
- Height: 187 cm (6 ft 2 in)
- Weight: 84 kg (185 lb; 13.2 st)
- Division: Middleweight
- Style: Kickboxing
- Stance: Orthodox
- Fighting out of: Varna, Bulgaria
- Team: SK Dream Varna
- Trainer: Dobromir Ivanov
- Years active: 2016–present

Kickboxing record
- Total: 27
- Wins: 21
- By knockout: 7
- Losses: 6
- By knockout: 3

Eduard Aleksanyan (born January 1, 1997) is a Bulgarian kickboxer of Armenian descent, currently competing in the middleweight division of Senshi. He also competed for Golden Fighter Championship.

As of April 2023, he is ranked as the tenth best middleweight kickboxer in the world by Combat Press.

== Professional kickboxing career ==
=== SENSHI ===
Aleksanyan faced Branko Babachev at Ultimate Pro Fight 7 on March 10, 2017. He won the fight by unanimous decision. Aleksanyan and Babachev faced each other in an immediate rematch at Ultimate Pro Fight 10 on July 20, 2017. Babachev won the fight by unanimous decision.

On June 1, 2018, Aleksanyan travelled to Poland to challenge Kamil Jenel for his DSF Kickboxing Challenge -81 kg title. He lost the fight by technical knockout.

Aleksanyan made his SENSHI debut against Radoslav Kostov at the inaugural SENSHI event on February 23, 2019. He lost the fight by unanimous decision. Aleksanyan returned to the regional circuit to face Janu Da Cruz for the Savages Kickboxing Middleweight (-80 kg) title at Savages Kickboxing 2 on September 28, 2019. He captured the title by stoppage.

Aleksanyan faced Thomas Doeve at Senshi 4 on October 26, 2019. He won the fight by unanimous decision. Aleksanyan failed to build on this success however, as he suffered a unanimous decision loss to Nikola Todorović at Senshi 6 on August 21, 2020.

Aleksanyan faced Ljubo Jalovi for the WAKO-Pro International K-1 Light Heavyweight (-81.4 kg) title at Senshi 7 on February 27, 2021. He won the fight by a fifth-round technical knockout. Aleksanyan next faced Madalin Mogos at Senshi 8 on May 22, 2021. He won the fight by unanimous decision. Aleksanyan was then booked to face Pavel Shelest at Senshi 9 on July 10, 2021. He won the fight by unanimous decision. Aleksanyan faced Pavel Turuk at Senshi 10 on December 4, 2021, in his fourth and final fight of the year. He won the fight by unanimous decision.

Aleksanyan faced Vladyslav Tiurmenko at Senshi 11 on February 26, 2021. He won the fight by unanimous decision. Aleksanyan next faced Beni Osmanoski at Senshi 12 on July 9, 2022. He stopped Osmanoski with a right straight 47 seconds into the fight. Aleksanyan then faced Daniel Krost at Senshi 13 on September 10, 2022. He won the fight by a liver shot knockout a minute into the opening round. In his fourth and last fight of the year, which took place at Senshi 14 on December 3, 2022, Aleksanyan faced Madani Rahmani. He won the fight by a second-round technical knockout.

Aleksanyan faced Giuseppe de Domenico at Senshi 15 on March 18, 2023. He won the fight by unanimous decision. Aleksanyan next faced Jakob Styben for the vacant SENSHI European -90 kg title at SENSHI 18 on September 16, 2023.

=== GLORY ===
Aleksanyan made his Glory debut against Mohamed Touchassie at Glory 89 on October 7, 2023. He lost the fight by a second-round technical knockout.

Aleksanyan made his first SENSHI European -90 kg title defense against Jakob Styben at SENSHI 22 on July 6, 2024. He won the fight by a second-round knockout. Aleksaynan underwent surgery on the metatarsal bone of his right foot following this victory, an injury that he sustained after his bout with Styben at Senshi 18.

Aleksanyan made his heavyweight debut against Marius Munteanu at SENSHI 29 on December 6, 2025. He won the fight by a second-round technical knockout.

== Championships and accomplishments ==
- Savages Kickboxing
  - 2019 Savages Kickboxing Middleweight (-80 kg) Championship
- World Association of Kickboxing Organizations
  - 2020 WAKO-Pro International K-1 Light-Heavyweight (-81.4 kg) Championship
- SENSHI
  - 2023 SENSHI European KWU Full Contact -90 kg Championship

== Fight record ==
Professional kickboxing record
21 wins (7 (T)KOs), 6 losses, 0 draws
Date	Result	Opponent	Event	Location	Method	Round	Time
2026-09-05	Loss	(Romania) Yuri Farcaș	SENSHI 33 - Light Heavyweight Grand Prix, Quarterfinals	Varna, Bulgaria	TKO (calf kicks)	1	2:45
2025-12-06	Win	(Romania) Marius Munteanu	SENSHI 29	Varna, Bulgaria	TKO (punches)	2	1:14
2024-07-06	Win	(Germany) Jakob Styben	SENSHI 22	Varna, Bulgaria	KO (left hook)	2	3:00
Defends the SENSHI European -90 kg title.
2023-10-07	Loss	(Morocco) Mohamed Touchassie	Glory 89	Burgas, Bulgaria	TKO (3 knockdowns)	2	2:00
2023-09-16	Win	(Germany) Jakob Styben	SENSHI 18	Varna, Bulgaria	Decision (majority)	3	3:00
Wins the vacant SENSHI European -90 kg title.
2023-03-18	Win	(Italy) Giuseppe de Domenico	SENSHI 15	Varna, Bulgaria	Decision (unanimous)	3	3:00
2022-12-03	Win	(Belgium) Madani Rahmani	SENSHI 14	Varna, Bulgaria	TKO (shoulder injury)	2	
2022-09-10	Win	(France) Daniel Krost	SENSHI 13	Varna, Bulgaria	KO (liver shot)	1	0:59
2022-07-09	Win	(Switzerland) Beni Osmanoski	SENSHI 12	Varna, Bulgaria	KO (right straight)	1	0:47
2022-02-26	Win	(Ukraine) Vladyslav Tiurmenko	SENSHI 11	Varna, Bulgaria	Decision (unanimous)	3	3:00
2021-12-04	Win	(Belarus) Pavel Turuk	SENSHI 10	Varna, Bulgaria	Decision (unanimous)	3	3:00
2021-07-10	Win	(Belarus) Pavel Shelest	SENSHI 9	Varna, Bulgaria	Decision (unanimous)	3	3:00
2021-05-22	Win	(Romania) Mădălin Mogoș	SENSHI 8	Varna, Bulgaria	Decision (unanimous)	3	3:00
2021-02-27	Win	(Serbia) Ljubo Jalovi	SENSHI 7	Varna, Bulgaria	TKO (punches)	5	2:00
Wins the WAKO-Pro International K-1 Light Heavyweight (-81.4 kg) title.
2020-08-21	Loss	(Serbia) Nikola Todorović	SENSHI 6	Varna, Bulgaria	Decision (unanimous)	3	3:00
2019-10-26	Win	(Netherlands) Thomas Doeve	SENSHI 4	Varna, Bulgaria	Decision (unanimous)	3	3:00
2019-09-28	Win	(Portugal) Janu Da Cruz	Savages Kickboxing 2	Varna, Bulgaria	KO (punch)		
Wins the Savages Kickboxing Middleweight (-80 kg) title.
2019-08-17	Win	(Bulgaria) Sabri Atai	TFC 1	Varna, Bulgaria	Decision (unanimous)	3	3:00
2019-02-23	Loss	(Bulgaria) Radoslav Kostov	SENSHI 1	Varna, Bulgaria	Decision (unanimous)	3	3:00
2018-06-01	Loss	(Poland) Kamil Jenel	DSF Kickboxing Challenge 16	Zabrze, Poland	TKO		
For the DSF Kickboxing World K-1 -81 kg title.
2018-04-28	Win	(Romania) Alex Filip	GFC 4	Varna, Bulgaria	KO (overhand right)	2	1:15
2017-07-20	Loss	(Bulgaria) Branko Babachev	Ultimate Pro Fight 10	Varna, Bulgaria	Decision (unanimous)	3	3:00
2017-03-10	Win	(Bulgaria) Branko Babachev	Ultimate Pro Fight 7	Varna, Bulgaria	Decision (unanimous)	3	3:00
2016-10-07	Win	(Bulgaria) Nikola Asenov	Ultimate Pro Fight 6	Varna, Bulgaria	Decision (unanimous)	3	3:00
Legend: Win Loss Draw/no contest Notes

== See also ==
- List of male kickboxers
