= Cem Cáceres =

Dutch-Turkish kickboxer

- Born: Cem Cáceres; December 8, 1999 (age 26); Enschede, Netherlands
- Height: 6 ft 3 in (1.91 m)
- Weight: 95 kg (209 lb; 15.0 st)
- Stance: Orthodox
- Fighting out of: Amsterdam, Netherlands
- Team: Mike's Gym
- Trainer: Mike Passenier

Kickboxing record
- Total: 25
- Wins: 21
- By knockout: 14
- Losses: 4
- By knockout: 2

Other information
- Notable relatives: Murat Aygün (cousin)

Cem Cáceres (born December 8, 1999) is a Dutch professional kickboxer of Turkish and Chilean descent, currently competing in the light heavyweight division of Glory.

As of September 2024 he was the #5 ranked Light heavyweight kickboxer in the world by Beyond Kickboxing.

== Professional career ==
=== Early career ===
Cáceres faced Jeroen Trijsburg at a World Fighting League event on March 25, 2018. He won the fight by first-round technical knockout.

On October 14, 2023, Cáceres defeated Germain Kpoghomou by unanimous decision at Enfusion Talents 107.

=== Glory ===
Cáceres made his debut for the Glory promotion at the Glory Light Heavyweight Grand Prix event against Mohammed Amine. He won the bout by second-round knockout with a left hook.

Cáceres was expected to face Mory Kromah at Glory 94 on August 31, 2024. He was called to replace Bahram Rajabzadeh against Ștefan Lătescu in the main event. He won the fight by first-round knockout with a left hook to the body.

Cáceres faced Pascal Touré at Glory Collision 7 on December 7, 2024. He won the fight by unanimous decision.

== Championships and accomplishments ==
- Glory
  - 2024 Glory Newcomer of the Year
- Kickboxing Romania Awards
  - 2024 Upset of the Year vs. Ștefan Lătescu

== Professional kickboxing record ==
Professional kickboxing record
20 Wins (14 (T)KOs), 4 Losses, 0 Draws
Date	Result	Opponent	Event	Location	Method	Round	Time
2026-06-13	Loss	(Morocco) Mohamed Touchassie	Glory Collision 9 - Light Heavyweight Grand Prix, Semifinals	Rotterdam, Netherlands	Decision (Unanimous)	3	3:00
2026-06-13	Win	(Morocco) Mohammed Hamdi	Glory Collision 9 - Light Heavyweight Grand Prix, Quarterfinals	Rotterdam, Netherlands	Decision (Unanimous)	3	3:00
2026-04-25	Win	(Romania) Sebastian Lutaniuc	Glory 107	Rotterdam, Netherlands	Decision (Unanimous)	3	3:00
2025-12-13	Loss	(Serbia) Miloš Cvjetićanin	Glory Collision 8 - Light Heavyweight Tournament, Semifinals	Arnhem, Netherlands	KO (Right hook)	1	1:10
2025-06-14	Loss	(Serbia) Miloš Cvjetićanin	Glory 100, Last Heavyweight Standing Qualification Round, Semifinals	Rotterdam, Netherlands	TKO (Doctor stoppage)	1	2:01
2025-02-22	Win	(Guinea) Mory Kromah	Glory 98	Rotterdam, Netherlands	Decision (Split)	3	3:00
2024-12-07	Win	(France) Pascal Touré	Glory Collision 7	Arnhem, Netherlands	Decision (Unanimous)	3	3:00
2024-08-31	Win	(Romania) Ștefan Lătescu	Glory 94	Antwerp, Belgium	KO (Left hook to the body)	1	2:08
2024-06-08	Win	(Morocco) Mohammed Amine	Glory Light Heavyweight Grand Prix	Rotterdam, Netherlands	TKO (Left hook)	2	1:32
2023-12-30	Win	(Netherlands) Shenrik Look	Enfusion 132	Alkmaar, Netherlands	Decision (Unanimous)	3	3:00
2023-10-14	Win	(France) Germain Kpoghomou	Enfusion Talents 107	Nijmegen, Netherlands	KO (Punches)	3	2:20
2023-06-24	Win	(Democratic Republic of the Congo) Memphis Kasongo	World Fighting League	The Hague, Netherlands	KO (Punches)		
2019-07-20	Win	(Italy) Mariano Atzeni	Muay Thai Rulez 3	Sardinia, Italy	KO (Punches)	3	
2019-06-29	Win	(Germany) Ali Boutaleb	Fightnight Meppen	Meppen, Germany	TKO (Punches)		
2018-11-17	Loss	(Suriname) Noach Blyden	Rings Fighting Network 2018	Aalsmeer, Netherlands	Decision (Split)	3	3:00
2018-05-26	Win	(Netherlands) Ton Berendsen	Rings Fighting Network 2018	Amstelveen, Netherlands	KO (Body shot)	3	
2018-03-25	Win	(Netherlands) Jeroen Trijsburg	World Fighting League	Almere, Netherlands	TKO	1	
Legend: Win Loss Draw/No contest Notes

== See also ==
- List of male kickboxers
