= 2026 in Glory =

Kickboxing events

Information
- First date: February 7, 2026

The year 2026 is the 15th year in the history of Glory, an international kickboxing promotion.

The numbered Glory events are broadcast on various services such as Triller TV, KIJK, CSN, Go3 and Pro Arena.

== List of events ==
#	Event Title	Date	Arena	Location
1	Glory 105	February 7, 2026	GelreDome	Arnhem, Netherlands
2	Glory 106	March 28, 2026	Ryōgoku Kokugikan	Tokyo, Japan
3	Glory 107	April 25, 2026	RTM Stage	Rotterdam, Netherlands
4	Glory 108	June 6, 2026	Ota City General Gymnasium	Tokyo, Japan
5	Glory Collision 9	June 13, 2026	Rotterdam Ahoy	Rotterdam, Netherlands
6	Glory 109	September 5, 2026	RTM Stage	Rotterdam, Netherlands
7	Glory 110	October 17, 2026	Lotto Arena	Antwerp, Belgium
8	Glory Rivals 6	November 28, 2026	Maaspoort	Den Bosch, Netherlands
9	Glory Collision 10	December 12, 2026	GelreDome	Arnhem, Netherlands

== Glory 105 ==
Glory 105
- Promotion: Glory
- Date: February 7, 2026
- Venue: GelreDome
- City: Arnhem, Netherlands
- Attendance: 25,000

Glory 105 - Last Heavyweight Standing Finals was a kickboxing event produced by Glory that took place in 2026, in Arnhem, Netherlands.

=== Background ===
The finals of the 2026 Glory Last Heavyweight Standing were held at the event.

==== 2026 Glory Last Heavyweight Standing Finals bracket ====
Quarter-finals
(Morocco) Anis Bouzid	UD
(Netherlands) Errol Zimmerman	3
(Serbia) Miloš Cvjetićanin	UD
(France) Sofian Laidouni	3
(Ghana) Michael Boapeah	3
(Guinea) Mory Kromah	UD
(Morocco) Nidal Bchiri	2
(Nigeria) Tariq Osaro	KO

Semi-finals
(Morocco) Anis Bouzid	3
(Serbia) Miloš Cvjetićanin	MD
(Guinea) Mory Kromah	UD
(Nigeria) Tariq Osaro	3

Final
(Serbia) Miloš Cvjetićanin
(Guinea) Mory Kromah	WO^{1}

^{1} Miloš Cvjetićanin was not cleared by the doctor to compete in the final. The two reservist declined the spot, making Mory Kromah the winner by default.

=== Fight card ===
Glory 105 - Last Heavyweight Standing Finals
Weight Class				Method	Round	Time	Notes
Heavyweight +95 kg	(Guinea) Mory Kromah	vs.	(Serbia) Miloš Cvjetićanin	Walkover			Glory Last Heavyweight Standing Finals, Final. For the vacant Glory Heavyweight Championship
Heavyweight +95 kg	(Azerbaijan) Bahram Rajabzadeh	def.	(Romania) Cristian Ristea	KO (Punches)	1	0:31	
Heavyweight +95 kg	(Guinea) Mory Kromah	def.	(Nigeria) Tariq Osaro	Decision (Unanimous)	3	3:00	Glory Last Heavyweight Standing Finals, Semifinals
Heavyweight +95 kg	(Serbia) Miloš Cvjetićanin	def.	(Morocco) Anis Bouzid	Decision (Majority)	3	3:00	Glory Last Heavyweight Standing Finals, Semifinals
Catchweight 84 kg	(Morocco) Hamicha	def.	(Cameroon) Brice Kombou	Decision (Unanimous)	3	3:00	
Heavyweight +95 kg	(Nigeria) Tariq Osaro	def.	(Morocco) Nidal Bchiri	KO (Right punch)	2	2:30	Glory Last Heavyweight Standing Finals, Quarterfinals
Heavyweight +95 kg	(Guinea) Mory Kromah	def.	(Ghana) Michael Boapeah	Decision (Unanimous)	3	3:00	Glory Last Heavyweight Standing Finals, Quarterfinals
Heavyweight +95 kg	(Serbia) Miloš Cvjetićanin	def.	(France) Sofian Laidouni	Decision (Unanimous)	3	3:00	Glory Last Heavyweight Standing Finals, Quarterfinals
Heavyweight +95 kg	(Morocco) Anis Bouzid	def.	(Netherlands) Errol Zimmerman	Decision (Unanimous)	3	3:00	Glory Last Heavyweight Standing Finals, Quarterfinals
Featherweight 65 kg	(Turkey) Deniz Demirkapu	def.	(Portugal) Andre Santos	Decision (Unanimous)	3	3:00	
Superfight Series
Light Heavyweight 95 kg	(Romania) Alin Nechita	def.	(Cape Verde) Luis Tavares	Decision (Split)	3	3:00	
Heavyweight +95 kg	(Turkey) Serdar Eroğlu	def.	(Romania) Vasile Amariței	Decision (Unanimous)	3	3:00	Glory Last Heavyweight Standing Finals, reserve
Light Heavyweight 95 kg	(Romania) Ștefan Lătescu	def.	(Italy) Enrico Pellegrino	Decision (Unanimous)	3	3:00	
Light Heavyweight 95 kg	(Morocco) Mohammed Hamdi	def.	(Turkey) Emin Özer	Decision (Unanimous)	3	3:00	

== Glory 106 ==
Glory 106
- Promotion: RISE; Glory
- Date: March 28, 2026
- Venue: Ryōgoku Kokugikan
- City: Tokyo, Japan
- Attendance: 9,000

Glory 106 or RISE Eldorado 2026 was a kickboxing event that was held by RISE and Glory at the Ryōgoku Kokugikan in Tokyo, Japan on March 28, 2026.

=== Background ===
A RISE Bantamweight World title bout between champion Shiro and challenger Koki Osaki was scheduled as the main event, while the GLORY x RISE Last Featherweight Standing Quarterfinals took place on the undercard.

=== Fight Card ===
Glory 106
Weight Class				Method	Round	Time	Notes
Bantamweight 55 kg	(Japan) Koki Osaki	def.	(Japan) Shiro (c)	Decision (unanimous)	5	3:00	For the RISE Bantamweight World title
Super Flyweight 53 kg	(Japan) Ryujin Nasukawa	def.	(Japan) Kaito Hasegawa	TKO (3 knockdowns)	5	1:17	For the vacant RISE Super Flyweight title
Catchweight 59 kg	(Japan) Haruto Yasumoto	def.	(Japan) Takumi Terada	Decision (unanimous)	3	3:00	
Featherweight 65 kg	(Japan) Kento Haraguchi	def.	(Japan) Hiroki Kasahara	Decision (unanimous)	3	3:00	GLORY x RISE Last Featherweight Standing Quarterfinals
Featherweight 65 kg	(Japan) YURA	def.	(South Korea) Lee Sung-hyun	TKO (punches)	3	2:55	GLORY x RISE Last Featherweight Standing Quarterfinals
Featherweight 65 kg	(Thailand) Petpanomrung Kiatmuu9	def.	(Mexico) Abraham Vidales	Decision (unanimous)	3	3:00	GLORY x RISE Last Featherweight Standing Quarterfinals
Featherweight 65 kg	(Portugal) Miguel Trindade	def.	(Albania) Berjan Peposhi	Ext.R Decision (unanimous)	4	3:00	GLORY x RISE Last Featherweight Standing Quarterfinals
Catchweight 66 kg	(Thailand) Capitan Petchyindee Academy	def.	(Japan) Taiju Shiratori	Tech decision (majority)	4	0:28	
Catchweight 61.5 kg	(Japan) Kan Nakamura	def.	(Thailand) Phet A-Cheer BangsaenFightClub	KO (left cross)	1	2:40	
Preliminary Card
Catchweight 60 kg	(Japan) Yuta Kunieda	def.	(Japan) Yoshihisa Morimoto	Decision (majority)	3	3:00	
Lightweight 70 kg	(Japan) Kakushi Takagi	def.	(Japan) Ryoya Inai	Decision (unanimous)	3	3:00	
Catchweight 55 kg	(Japan) Masahiko Suzuki	def.	(Japan) Ryoya Ito	TKO (3 knockdowns)	1	2:24	
Catchweight 51.5 kg	(Japan) Shion Masaki	def.	(Japan) Toranosuke Matsuda	Decision (unanimous)	3	3:00	
Catchweight 57.5 kg	(Japan) Aira	def.	(Japan) Yuki Matsumoto	Decision (unanimous)	3	3:00	
Catchweight 60 kg	(Japan) Toru Kugo	def.	(Japan) Taku Endo	Decision (unanimous)	3	3:00	

== Glory 107 ==
Glory 107
- Promotion: Glory
- Date: April 25, 2026
- Venue: RTM Stage
- City: Rotterdam, Netherlands
- Attendance: 7,800

Glory 107 was a kickboxing event that was held by Glory at the RTM Stage in Rotterdam, Netherlands on April 25, 2026.

=== Background ===
Glory 107 will feature six qualifiers bouts for the upcoming 2026 Glory Light Heavyweight Grand Prix.

Originally the main event was Rajabzadeh vs. Wisse for the Light Heavyweight title but the fight was canceled after Rajabzadeh got injured.

=== Fight Card ===
Glory 107
Weight Class				Method	Round	Time	Notes
Middleweight 85 kg	(Suriname) Chico Kwasi	def.	(Suriname) Donovan Wisse (c)	Decision (split)	3	3:00	For the Glory Middleweight Championship.
Heavyweight	(Nigeria) Tariq Osaro	def.	(Cape Verde) Nico Horta	Decision (unanimous)	3	3:00	
Light Heavyweight 95 kg	(Turkey) Cem Cáceres	def.	(Romania) Sebastian Lutaniuc	Decision (unanimous)	3	3:00	2026 Glory Light Heavyweight Grand Prix Proving Ground contest
Light Heavyweight 95 kg	(Morocco) Mohamed Touchassie	def.	(Netherlands) Jimmy Livinus	Decision (unanimous)	3	3:00	2026 Glory Light Heavyweight Grand Prix Proving Ground contest
Light Heavyweight 95 kg	(Romania) Ștefan Lătescu	def.	(Cape Verde) Iuri Fernandes	Decision (unanimous)	3	3:00	2026 Glory Light Heavyweight Grand Prix Proving Ground contest
Heavyweight	(Morocco) Nabil Khachab	def.	(Netherlands) Errol Koning	Ext.R Decision (split)	4	3:00	
Light Heavyweight 95 kg	(Morocco) Mohammed Hamdi	def.	(Romania) Alin Nechita	Decision (split)	3	3:00	2026 Glory Light Heavyweight Grand Prix Proving Ground contest
Light Heavyweight 95 kg	(Cape Verde) Luis Tavares	def.	(Morocco) Mohamed Amine	Decision (unanimous)	3	3:00	2026 Glory Light Heavyweight Grand Prix Proving Ground contest
Welterweight 77 kg	(Morocco) Mohammed Boutasaa	def.	(France) Cédric Do	Decision (unanimous)	3	3:00	
Superfight Series
Heavyweight	(Serbia) Rade Opačić	def.	(Suriname) Colin George	Decision (unanimous)	3	3:00	
Featherweight 65 kg	(Turkey) Deniz Demirkapu	def.	(Morocco) Mohamed Hamami	KO (knee to the body)	2	1:45	
Light Heavyweight 95 kg	(Bosnia and Herzegovina) Albert Ugrinčić	def.	(Netherlands) Clayton Raven	Decision (unanimous)	3	3:00	2026 Glory Light Heavyweight Grand Prix Proving Ground contest
Welterweight 77 kg	(Germany) Valentin Knau	def.	(Croatia) Antonio Krajinović	Decision (unanimous)	3	3:00	
Welterweight 77 kg	(Italy) Michael Samperi	def.	(Morocco) Said Kabil	KO (left hook)	2	0:42	

== Glory 108 ==
Glory 108 RISE World Series 2026 Tokyo
- Promotion: RISE; Glory
- Date: June 6, 2026
- Venue: Ota City General Gymnasium
- City: Tokyo, Japan

Glory 108 - Last Featherweight Standing Final or RISE World Series 2026 Tokyo is a kickboxing event that will be held by RISE and Glory at the Ota City General Gymnasium in Tokyo, Japan on June 6, 2026.

=== Background ===
The event will feature the final 4-man tournament of the Glory x Rise Last Featherweight Standing Tournament.

=== GLORY x RISE Last Featherweight Standing bracket ===
Opening Round (2025-06-21) & (2025-08-02)
(France) Bobo Sacko	UD
(Netherlands) Jan Kaffa	3
(Morocco) Ayoub Bourass	3
(Spain) Aitor Currito	UD
(Italy) Achraf Aasila	UD
(Algeria) Lounis Saing	3
(Germany) Denis Wosik	UD
(Thailand) Suarek TeppenGym	3
(Japan) YURA	TKO
(China) Kong Dexiang	1
(Japan) Yutaro Asahi	KO
(Spain) Catalin Eduardo	3
(Japan) Sumiya Ito	3
(Moldova) Petru Morari	SD
(Japan) Hiroki Kasahara	UD
(Thailand) Lompetch BeastGym	3

Second Round (2025-10-11), (2025-11-02) & (2025-12-13)
(Portugal) Miguel Trindade	UD
(France) Bobo Sacko	3
(Spain) Aitor Currito	3
(Albania) Berjan Peposhi	UD
(Mexico) Abraham Vidales	UD
(Italy) Achraf Aasila	3
(Germany) Denis Wosik	3
(Thailand) Petpanomrung Kiatmuu9	UD
(Australia) Chadd Collins
(Japan) YURA	BYE^{a}
(Japan) Yutaro Asahi	3
(South Korea) Lee Sung-hyun	MD
(Japan) Kento Haraguchi	TKO
(Moldova) Petru Morari	1
(Japan) Hiroki Kasahara	UD
(Japan) Taiju Shiratori	Ex.R

Quarterfinals (2026-03-28)
(Portugal) Miguel Trindade	UD
(Albania) Berjan Peposhi	Ex.R
(Mexico) Abraham Vidales	3
(Thailand) Petpanomrung Kiatmuu9	UD
(Japan) YURA	TKO
(South Korea) Lee Sung-hyun	3
(Japan) Kento Haraguchi	UD
(Japan) Hiroki Kasahara	3

Semifinals
(Portugal) Miguel Trindade	3
(Thailand) Petpanomrung Kiatmuu9	MD
(Japan) YURA	3
(Japan) Kento Haraguchi	UD

Final
(Japan) Kento Haraguchi	UD
(Thailand) Petpanomrung Kiatmuu9	Ex.R

^{a} YURA qualified automatically as Chadd Collins withdrew form the fight due to injury.

=== Fight Card ===
Glory 108
Weight Class				Method	Round	Time	Notes
Featherweight 65 kg	(Japan) Kento Haraguchi	def.	(Thailand) Petpanomrung Kiatmuu9	Ext.R Decision (unanimous)	4	3:00	GLORY x RISE Last Featherweight Standing Final
Catchweight 55 kg	(Japan) Kazuki Osaki	def.	(Japan) Ryujin Nasukawa	Ext.R Decision (unanimous)	4	3:00	
Catchweight 63.5 kg	(Australia) Chadd Collins	def.	(Thailand) Kimluay WanKongOhm	Decision (majority)	3	3:00	
Catchweight 67.5 kg	(Japan) Meison Hide Usami	def.	(Thailand) Peemai Por.Kobkua	KO (uppercut)	1	0:43	
Catchweight 63.5 kg	(Japan) Yutaro Asahi	def.	(Thailand) Changsuek Petchyindee	Decision (majority)	3	3:00	
Catchweight 58 kg	(Japan) Haruto Yasumoto	def.	(China) Ze Waliuo	Decision (unanimous)	3	3:00	
Featherweight 65 kg	(Thailand) Petpanomrung Kiatmuu9	def.	(Portugal) Miguel Trindade	Decision (majority)	3	3:00	GLORY x RISE Last Featherweight Standing Semifinals
Featherweight 65 kg	(Japan) Kento Haraguchi	def.	(Japan) YURA	Decision (unanimous)	3	3:00	GLORY x RISE Last Featherweight Standing Semifinals
Catchweight 55 kg	(Japan) Masashi Kumura	def.	(Philippines) Joemar Gallaza	TKO (3 knockdowns)	1	1:23	
Catchweight 62.5 kg	(Japan) Kiyoto Takahashi	def.	(Japan) Achi	TKO (referee stoppage)	3	1:23	
Lightweight 70 kg	(Japan) Kakushi Takagi	def.	(Japan) Shoma	TKO (referee stoppage)	3	0:54	
Catchweight 67.5 kg	(Japan) Ruka	def.	(Japan) Aito	Decision (unanimous)	3	3:00	
Catchweight 51.5 kg	(Japan) Fuki Nakazawa	draw.	(Japan) Kyohei Nishijima	Decision (split)	3	3:00	
Preliminary Card
Catchweight 51.5 kg	(Japan) Yumeto Mizuno	def.	(Japan) Toranosuke Matsuda	TKO (punches)	1	0:42	
Catchweight 62.5 kg	(Japan) Mitsuki Gorichu Kanazawa	def.	(Japan) Yuga Asano	TKO (referee stoppage)	2	2:24	
Catchweight 53 kg	(Japan) Kodai Ono	def.	(Japan) Etsushi Kinoshita	Decision (unanimous)	3	3:00	

== Glory Collision 9 ==
Glory Collision 9
- Promotion: Glory
- Date: June 13, 2026
- Venue: Rotterdam Ahoy
- City: Rotterdam, Netherlands

Glory Collision 9 is a kickboxing event that will be held by Glory on June 13, 2026, in Rotterdam, Netherlands.

=== 2026 Glory Light Heavyweight Grand Prix bracket ===
Quarter-finals
(Turkey) Cem Cáceres	UD
(Morocco) Mohammed Hamdi	3
(Azerbaijan) Bahram Rajabzadeh	3
(Morocco) Mohamed Touchassie	UD
(Cape Verde) Luis Tavares	3
(Suriname) Donovan Wisse	UD
(Ghana) Michael Boapeah	UD
(Russia) Artem Vakhitov	3

Semi-finals
(Turkey) Cem Cáceres	3
(Morocco) Mohamed Touchassie	UD
(Suriname) Donovan Wisse	UD
(Ghana) Michael Boapeah	3

Final
(Morocco) Mohamed Touchassie	SD
(Suriname) Donovan Wisse	3

=== Fight card ===
Glory Collision 9
Weight Class				Method	Round	Time	Notes
Heavyweight +95 kg	(Guinea) Mory Kromah (c)	def.	(Serbia) Miloš Cvjetićanin	KO (jumping knee)	3	1:55	For the Glory Heavyweight Championship
Light Heavyweight 95 kg	(Morocco) Mohamed Touchassie	def.	(Suriname) Donovan Wisse	Decision (Split)	3	3:00	2026 Glory Light Heavyweight Grand Prix, Final
Heavyweight +95 kg	(Croatia) Antonio Plazibat	def.	(Morocco) Anis Bouzid	KO (Punches)	4	1:39	
Light Heavyweight 95 kg	(Bosnia and Herzegovina) Mesud Selimović	def.	(Morocco) Iliass Hammouche	Decision (Unanimous)	3	3:00	
Light Heavyweight 95 kg	(Suriname) Donovan Wisse	def.	(Ghana) Michael Boapeah	Decision (Unanimous)	3	3:00	2026 Glory Light Heavyweight Grand Prix, Semifinals
Light Heavyweight 95 kg	(Morocco) Mohamed Touchassie	def.	(Turkey) Cem Cáceres	Decision (Unanimous)	3	3:00	2026 Glory Light Heavyweight Grand Prix, Semifinals
Light Heavyweight 95 kg	(Ghana) Michael Boapeah	def.	(Russia) Artem Vakhitov	Decision (Unanimous)	3	3:00	2026 Glory Light Heavyweight Grand Prix, Quarterfinals
Light Heavyweight 95 kg	(Suriname) Donovan Wisse	def.	(Cape Verde) Luis Tavares	Decision (Unanimous)	3	3:00	2026 Glory Light Heavyweight Grand Prix, Quarterfinals
Light Heavyweight 95 kg	(Morocco) Mohamed Touchassie	def.	(Azerbaijan) Bahram Rajabzadeh	Decision (Unanimous)	3	3:00	2026 Glory Light Heavyweight Grand Prix, Quarterfinals
Superfight Series
Light Heavyweight 95 kg	(Turkey) Cem Cáceres	def.	(Morocco) Mohammed Hamdi	Decision (Unanimous)	3	3:00	2026 Glory Light Heavyweight Grand Prix, Quarterfinals
Catchweight 67 kg	(Turkey) Deniz Demirkapu	def.	(Albania) Berjan Peposhi	Decision (Unanimous)	3	3:00	
Light Heavyweight 95 kg	(Netherlands) Jimmy Livinus	def.	(Turkey) Serkan Özçağlayan	Decision (Unanimous)	3	3:00	2026 Glory Light Heavyweight Grand Prix, reserve
Welterweight 77 kg	(Netherlands) Figuereido Landman	def.	(Morocco) Mehdi Ait El Hadj	Decision (Unanimous)	3	3:00	
Featherweight 65 kg	(Portugal) André Santos	def.	(Algeria) Lounis Saing	Decision (Unanimous)	3	3:00	

== Glory 109 ==
Glory 109
- Promotion: Glory
- Date: September 5, 2026
- Venue: RTM Stage
- City: Rotterdam, Netherlands

Glory 109 is a kickboxing event that will be held by Glory on September 5, 2026, in Rotterdam, Netherlands.

=== Fight card ===
Glory 109
Weight Class				Method	Round	Time	Notes
Welterweight 77 kg	(Netherlands) Chico Kwasi (c)	def.	(Bulgaria) Teodor Hristov	Decision (Unanimous)	5	3:00	For the Glory Welterweight Championship
Heavyweight +95 kg	(Nigeria) Tariq Osaro	def.	(Netherlands) Errol Zimmerman	TKO (4 knockdowns)	2	1:54	
Welterweight 77 kg	(Morocco) Mohammed Boutasaa	def.	(Netherlands) Figuereido Landman	Decision (Unanimous)	3	3:00	Welterweight Grand Prix Proving Grounds
Welterweight 77 kg	(Netherlands) Jay Overmeer	def.	(Suriname) Don Sno	Decision (Unanimous)	3	3:00	Welterweight Grand Prix Proving Grounds
Welterweight 77 kg	(Russia) Dmitry Menshikov	def.	(France) Diaguely Camara	Decision (Unanimous)	3	3:00	Welterweight Grand Prix Proving Grounds
Welterweight 77 kg	(Croatia) Antonio Krajinović	def.	(Italy) Michael Samperi	TKO	3	1:51	Welterweight Grand Prix Proving Grounds
Middleweight 85 kg	(Morocco) Imad Hadar	def.	(Ivory Coast) Ulric Tiebe	TKO (Calf kicks)	2	1:49	
Superfight Series
Welterweight 77 kg	(Morocco) Anwar Ouled Chaib	def.	(Democratic Republic of the Congo) Christian Baya	Decision (Unanimous)	3	3:00	Welterweight Grand Prix Proving Grounds
Welterweight 77 kg	(Spain) Mohammed Hamdi	def.	(Germany) Valentin Knau	TKO (4 knockdowns)	2	1:13	Welterweight Grand Prix Proving Grounds
Welterweight 77 kg	(Serbia) Nikola Todorović	def.	(Turkey) Vedat Hödük	Decision (Unanimous)	3	3:00	Welterweight Grand Prix Proving Grounds
Welterweight 77 kg	(Morocco) Fikri Sabri	def.	(Moldova) Artiom Livădari	KO	2	0:36	Welterweight Grand Prix Proving Grounds
Featherweight 65 kg	(France) Imran Ben Slama	def.	(Morocco) Abdo Chahidi	Decision (Unanimous)	3	3:00	Chahidi missed weight (66.7 kg).

== Glory 110 ==
Glory 110
- Promotion: Glory
- Date: October 17, 2026
- Venue: Lotto Arena
- City: Antwerp, Belgium

Glory 110 is a kickboxing event that will be held by Glory on October 17, 2026, in Belgium.

=== Fight card ===
Glory 110
Weight Class				Method	Round	Time	Notes
Featherweight 65 kg	(Portugal) Miguel Trindade	def.	(Turkey) Deniz Demirkapu	TKO (three knockdowns)	3	1:33	For the vacant Glory Featherweight Championship
Light Heavyweight 95 kg	(Ghana) Michael Boapeah	def.	(Romania) Alin Nechita	Decision (Unanimous)	3	3:00	Glory Light Heavyweight Championship Eliminator.
Heavyweight +95 kg	(Morocco) Nidal Bchiri	def.	(Algeria) Nordine Mahieddine	KO (body kick)	1	2:59	
Featherweight -65 kg	(Albania) Berjan Peposhi	def.	(Cape Verde) Jeremi Monteiro	Decision (Unanimous)	3	3:00	
Middleweight 85 kg	(Nigeria) Joshua Akingbade	def.	(Spain) Alex Fernandez	TKO (Forfeit)	2	2:12	
Heavyweight +95 kg	(Morocco) Nabil Khachab	def.	(Romania) Ionuț Iancu	Decision (Unanimous)	3	3:00	
Middleweight 85 kg	(North Macedonia) Boban Ilioski	def.	(Morocco) Aimane Latifi	TKO (three knockdowns)	1	1:09	
Heavyweight +95 kg	(Algeria) Sofian Laïdouni	def.	(France) Karim Zeghad	Decision (Unanimous)	3	3:00	
Superfight Series
Heavyweight +95 kg	(Morocco) Bouziane Kaddani	def.	(Albania) Asdren Gashi	KO (Left hook)	3	2:59	
Welterweight 77 kg	(Italy) Valentino Valente	def.	(Albania) Shefit Qose	Decision (Unanimous)	3	3:00	
Light Heavyweight 95 kg	(France) Florent Gautier	def.	(Morocco) Abdelilah Azzouzi	Decision (Unanimous)	3	3:00	
Welterweight 77 kg	(Tunisia) Hamza Bouhani	def.	(Cameroon) Kenny Moukpwo	Decision (Majority)	3	3:00	
Featherweight -65 kg	(Morocco) Noah Ibrahimi	def.	(Morocco) Amine El Boujadaini	Decision (Unanimous)	3	3:00	

== Glory Rivals 6 ==
Glory Rivals 6
- Promotion: Glory; RFP
- Date: November 28, 2026
- Venue: Maaspoort
- City: Den Bosch Netherlands

Glory Rivals 6 is a kickboxing event that will be held by Glory and Ring Fight Promotion on the 28th of November 2026.

=== Fight card ===
Glory Rivals 6
Weight Class				Method	Round	Time	Notes
Lightweight 70 kg	(Turkey) Tayfun Özcan	vs.	(Morocco) Anouar Afakir				
Welterweight 77 kg	(Netherlands) Nick Regter	vs.	(Morocco) Youssef Khalouta				
Middleweight 85 kg	(Morocco) Chahid Hammouti	vs.	(Morocco) Anwar Dira				
Light Heavyweight 95 kg	(Turkey) Ali Cenik	vs.	(Morocco) Mo Amine				
Featherweight -65 kg	(Morocco) Amin Bakkali	vs.	(Germany) Dennis Haddad				
Featherweight -65 kg	(Morocco) Zakaria Belarej	vs.	(Afghanistan) Mohammed Mousavi				
Welterweight 77 kg	(Netherlands) Marcus Dillard	vs.	(Morocco) Ayyoub Boutahar				
Middleweight 85 kg	(Morocco) Anass Touchassie	vs.	(Netherlands) Dirrick Binnendijk				

== Glory Collision 10 ==
Glory Collision 10
- Promotion: Glory
- Date: December 12, 2026
- Venue: GelreDome
- City: Arnhem, Netherlands

Glory Collision 10 is a kickboxing event that will be held by Glory on December 12, 2026, in Arnhem, Netherlands.

=== 2026 Glory Welterweight Grand Prix bracket ===
Quarter-finals
(Bulgaria) Teodor Hristov
(Morocco) Anwar Ouled-Chaib
(Netherlands) Jay Overmeer
(Croatia) Antonio Krajinović
(Russia) Dmitry Menshikov
(Morocco) Fikri Sabri
(Suriname) Chico Kwasi
(Morocco) Mohammed Hamdi

Semi-finals

Final

=== Fight card ===
Glory Collision 10
Weight Class				Method	Round	Time	Notes
Heavyweight +95 kg	(Guinea) Mory Kromah (c)	vs.	(Croatia) Antonio Plazibat				For the Glory Heavyweight Championship
Welterweight 77 kg	TBD	vs.	TBD				2026 Welterweight Grand Prix, Final
Light Heavyweight 95 kg	(Morocco) Mohamed Touchassie (c)	vs.	(Morocco) Tarik Khbabez				For the Glory Light Heavyweight Championship
Light Heavyweight 95 kg	(Suriname) Donovan Wisse	vs.	(Romania) Ștefan Lătescu				Glory Light Heavyweight Championship Eliminator.
Welterweight 77 kg	TBD	vs.	TBD				2026 Welterweight Grand Prix, Semifinal
Welterweight 77 kg	TBD	vs.	TBD				2026 Welterweight Grand Prix, Semifinal
Heavyweight +95 kg	(Azerbaijan) Bahram Rajabzadeh	vs.	(Iran) Sina Karimian				
Superfight Series
Welterweight 77 kg	(Suriname) Chico Kwasi	vs.	(Morocco) Mohammed Hamdi				2026 Welterweight Grand Prix, Quarterfinal
Welterweight 77 kg	(Russia) Dmitry Menshikov	vs.	(Morocco) Fikri Sabri				2026 Welterweight Grand Prix, Quarterfinal
Welterweight 77 kg	(Netherlands) Jay Overmeer	vs.	(Croatia) Antonio Krajinović				2026 Welterweight Grand Prix, Quarterfinal
Welterweight 77 kg	(Bulgaria) Teodor Hristov	vs.	(Morocco) Anwar Ouled-Chaib				2026 Welterweight Grand Prix, Quarterfinal
Welterweight 77 kg	(Morocco) Hamicha	vs.	(Serbia) Nikola Todorović				2026 Welterweight Grand Prix, Reserve

== See also ==
- 2026 in ONE Championship
- 2026 in K-1
- 2026 in RISE
- 2026 in Romanian kickboxing
- 2026 in Wu Lin Feng
