= Ștefan Lătescu =

Romanian kickboxer

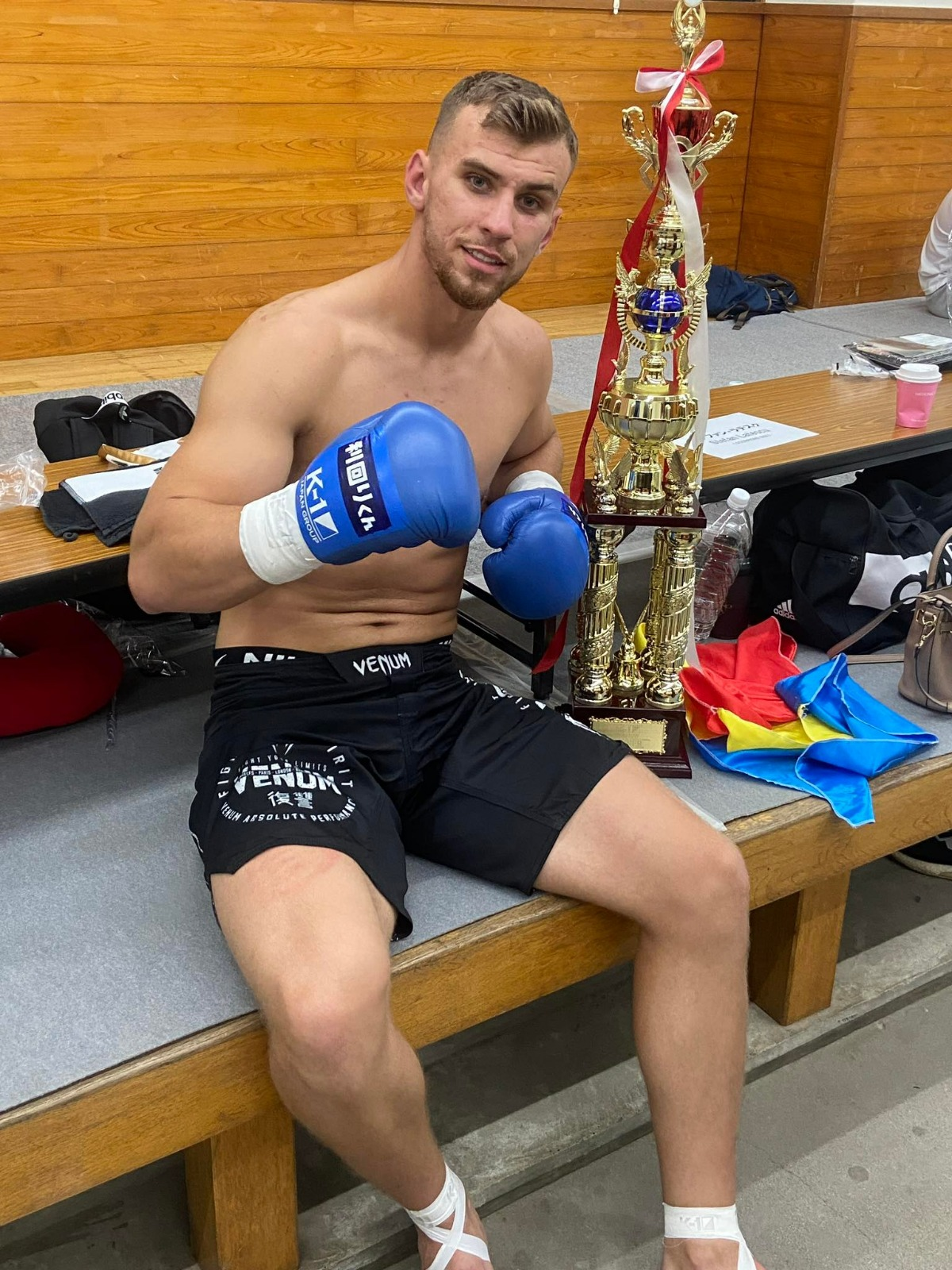
- Lătescu in 2023
- Born: 25 December 2001 (age 24); Iași, Romania
- Other names: Golden Boy
- Height: 6 ft 2 in (1.88 m)
- Weight: 96.5 kg (213 lb; 15.20 st)
- Division: Cruiserweight (2022–present); Heavyweight (2020–2022)
- Fighting out of: Iași, Romania
- Team: Scorpions Iași
- Trainer: Mihai Constantin
- Years active: 2020–present

Kickboxing record
- Total: 26
- Wins: 20
- By knockout: 9
- Losses: 6
- By knockout: 4
- Draws: 0

Ștefan Lătescu (Japanese: ステファン・ラテスク; born 25 December 2001) is a Romanian professional kickboxer, former boxer, and former Muay Thai and kempo practitioner, currently signed to GLORY. A former amateur in two sports, Lătescu notched over 150 wins in amateur kickboxing, and is the youngest senior heavyweight champion in the amateur boxing history of Romania. He is still undefeated nationally in boxing.

As of 1 December 2025, Lătescu is ranked the #7 light-heavyweight in the world.

== Professional kickboxing career ==
=== DFS ===
Lătescu made his professional debut against Eugen Mailat at DFS 7 on 5 March 2020. He won the fight by a first-round technical knockout. Lătescu was placed in the Dynamite Fighting Show Heavyweight tournament immediately afterwards, as he was booked to face Ionuț Iancu in the quarterfinals of the one-day tournament, which took place at DFS 8 on 20 August 2020. He lost the fight by split decision.

Lătescu bounced back from his first professional loss with a unanimous decision win over Florin Ivănoaie at DFS 9 on 4 December 2020. Lătescu next faced Marius Munteanu at DFS 10 on 10 March 2021. He won the fight by unanimous decision. Lătescu would go on to notch two more victories prior to fighting for his first professional title, as he overcame Dževad Poturak by unanimous decision at DFS 11 on 4 June 2021, and Konstantin Gluhov by unanimous decision at DFS 12 on 22 September 2021. His four fight win streak earned Lătescu the chance to face Ionuț Iancu for the vacant DFS Heavyweight Championship at DFS 13 on 15 December 2021. He lost the rematch by a second-round technical knockout, as he was knocked down three times by the two minute mark of the round.

Lătescu made his Senshi debut against Olivier Langlois-Ross at Senshi 12 on 9 July 2022. He won the fight by a third-round knockout. Lătescu next faced Jakob Styben at Senshi 13 in September 2022. He won the fight by unanimous decision. Lătescu returned to Dynamite Fighting Show in order to face Sam Tevette at DFS 14 on 19 October 2022. He won the fight by a first-round knockout.

=== K-1 ===
Lătescu made his K-1 debut against the 2022 K-1 World GP Japan Openweight Tournament winner Mahmoud Sattari at K-1 World GP 2022 in Osaka on 3 December 2022. He won the fight by a second-round technical knockout. Following this victory, Lătescu was ranked as the eighth-best light heavyweight kickboxer in the world by Beyond Kickboxing.

Lătescu faced the 2022 K-1 Japan Openweight Grand Prix finalist Seiya Tanigawa at K-1 World GP 2023: K'Festa 6 on 12 March 2023. He won the fight via KO in the second round.

Lătescu faced Adam Kosut at DFS 19 on 13 May 2023. He won the fight by a second-round knockout.

Lătescu faced the former Krush and K-1 cruiserweight champion K-Jee at K-1 World GP 2023 on 17 July 2023. He won the fight by a first-round knockout.

=== GLORY ===
Lătescu made his promotional Glory debut against Pascal Touré at Glory 88 on 9 September 2023. He won the fight by unanimous decision.

Lătescu faced Ibrahim El Bouni in a light heavyweight title eliminator at Glory: Collision 6 on 4 November 2023. He won the fight by a second-round technical knockout.

Lătescu faced Donegi Abena in the quarterfinals of the Glory Light Heavyweight Grand Prix, held on 8 June 2024, in Rotterdam, Netherlands. He lost the fight due to leg kicks in the third round.

Lătescu was expected to face Bahram Rajabzadeh at Glory 94 on 31 August 2024. He was later rescheduled to face Cem Cáceres. Lătescu lost the fight by a first-round knockout.

Lătescu faced Sergej Maslobojev at Glory Collision 7 on 7 December 2024. He lost the fight by unanimous decision.

Lătescu faced Michael Boapeah at Glory Underground on 1 May 2025. He lost the fight by a second-round technical knockout.

On 25 April 2026, Lătescu faced Iuri Fernandes at Glory 107. He won the fight by unanimous decision.

== Championships and accomplishments ==
=== Olympic-style boxing ===
- Romania Senior National Championship (2020, 2021, 2022)
- Romania Youth National Championship (2018, 2019)
- Romania Junior National Championship (2016, 2017)
- Romania Cadet National Championship (2015)
- Romanian Youth Cup (2018, 2019)

=== Kempo ===
- Romanian Kempo Federation
  - Romania Youth National Championship (2017)

=== Kickboxing ===
- Glory
  - 2023 Newcomer of the Year
- Dynamite Fighting Show
  - 2023 Best Global Performance
  - 2023 Knockout of the Year vs. Adam Kosut
  - 2022 Fighter of the Year
  - 2022 Knockout of the Year vs. Sam Tevette
  - 2021 Rising Star of the Year
  - Fight of the Night (One time) vs. Ionuț Iancu
  - 2019 Tellur Cup Winner
- K-1
  - Knockout of the Night (One time) vs. Mahmoud Sattari
- Senshi
  - Knockout of the Night (One time) vs. Olivier Langlois-Ross
- FRFK/FRAMC
  - Romania Junior National Championships (2014, 2015, 2016, 2017, 2018, 2019)
- ISKA
  - 2019 ISKA Amateur Members Association World Championships Junior Gold Medalist
- Whowillwinfighting
  - 2023 Fighter of the Year
- Kickboxing Romania Awards
  - 2023 Fighter of the Year
  - 2023 International Fighter of the Year
  - 2023 Performance of the Year vs. Ibrahim El Bouni
  - 2024 Upset of the Year vs. Cem Cáceres

=== Muay Thai ===
- World Muay Federation
  - 2017 WMF World Muaythai Championships Junior Silver Medalist
- European Muay Confederation
  - 2017 EMC European Muaythai Championships Junior Gold Medalist
  - 2016 EMC European Muaythai Championships Junior Gold Medalist
  - 2015 EMC European Muaythai Championships Junior Gold Medalist

== Professional kickboxing record ==
Professional kickboxing record
20 Wins (9 (T)KOs), 6 Losses (4 (T)KO), 0 Draws
Date	Result	Opponent	Event	Location	Method	Round	Time	Record
2026-12-12		(Suriname) Donovan Wisse	Glory Collision 10	Arnhem, Netherlands				
2026-04-25	Win	(Cape Verde) Iuri Fernandes	Glory 107	Rotterdam, Netherlands	Decision (unanimous)	3	3:00	20–6
2026-02-07	Win	(Italy) Enrico Pellegrino	Glory 105	Arnhem, Netherlands	Decision (unanimous)	3	3:00	19–6
2025-10-24	Win	(Switzerland) Frank Kanaté	DFS 28	Pitești, Romania	KO (right hook)	1	0:48	18–6
2025-05-01	Loss	(Ghana) Michael Boapeah	Glory Underground	Miami, Florida, US	TKO (Low kicks)	2	1:54	17–6
2024-12-07	Loss	(Lithuania) Sergej Maslobojev	Glory Collision 7	Arnhem, Netherlands	Decision (Unanimous)	3	3:00	17–5
2024-08-31	Loss	(Turkey) Cem Cáceres	Glory 94	Antwerp, Belgium	KO (Left hook to the body)	1	2:08	17–4
2024-06-08	Loss	(Suriname) Donegi Abena	Glory Light Heavyweight Grand Prix, Quarterfinals	Rotterdam, Netherlands	TKO (Low kicks)	3	0:59	17–3
2023-11-04	Win	(Morocco) Ibrahim El Bouni	Glory: Collision 6	Arnhem, Netherlands	TKO (three knockdowns)	2	1:00	17–2
Glory Light Heavyweight Title Eliminator
2023-09-09	Win	(France) Pascal Touré	Glory 88	Paris, France	Decision (unanimous)	3	3:00	16–2
2023-07-17	Win	(Japan) K-Jee	K-1 World GP 2023	Tokyo, Japan	KO (left hook to the body)	1	1:53	15–2
2023-05-13	Win	(Poland) Adam Kosut	DFS 19	Buzău, Romania	KO (right hook)	1	1:37	14–2
2023-03-12	Win	(Japan) Seiya Tanigawa	K-1 World GP 2023: K'Festa 6	Tokyo, Japan	KO (punches)	2	2:49	13–2
2022-12-03	Win	(Iran) Mahmoud Sattari	K-1 World GP 2022 in Osaka	Osaka, Japan	TKO (punches)	2	1:37	12–2
2022-10-19	Win	(Senegal) Sam Tevette	DFS 16	Iași, Romania	KO (punches)	1	2:51	11–2
2022-09-10	Win	(Germany) Jakob Styben	Senshi 13	Varna, Bulgaria	Decision (unanimous)	3	3:00	10–2
2022-07-09	Win	(Canada) Olivier Langlois-Ross	Senshi 12	Varna, Bulgaria	KO (left hook)	3	0:55	9–2
2022-05-06	Win	(France) Frangis Front Goma	DFS 14	Bucharest, Romania	Decision (unanimous)	3	3:00	8–2
2021-12-15	Loss	(Romania) Ionuț Iancu	DFS 13	Bucharest, Romania	TKO (three knockdowns)	2	2:01	7–2
For the DFS Heavyweight Championship.
2021-09-22	Win	(Latvia) Konstantin Gluhov	DFS 12	Baia Mare, Romania	Decision (unanimous)	3	3:00	7–1
2021-06-04	Win	(Bosnia and Herzegovina) Dževad Poturak	DFS 11	Bucharest, Romania	Decision (unanimous)	3	3:00	6–1
2021-03-10	Win	(Romania) Marius Munteanu	DFS 10	Bucharest, Romania	Decision (unanimous)	3	3:00	5–1
2020-12-04	Win	(Romania) Florin Ivănoaie	DFS 9	Cluj-Napoca, Romania	Decision (unanimous)	3	3:00	4–1
2020-08-20	Loss	(Romania) Ionuț Iancu	DFS 8, Quarter Finals	Bucharest, Romania	Decision (split)	3	2:00	3–1
2020-03-05	Win	(Romania) Eugen Mailat	DFS 7	Arad, Romania	TKO (referee stoppage)	1	1:36	3–0
Legend: Win Loss Draw/No contest Notes

== Personal life ==
Lătescu became a father in 2025 when his daughter was born.

== See also ==
- List of male kickboxers
