= Mohamed Touchassie =

Moroccan-Dutch kickboxer

- Born: October 20, 2001 (age 25); The Hague, Netherlands
- Nationality: Dutch / Moroccan
- Height: 1.94 m (6 ft 4 1/2 in)
- Weight: 95 kg (209 lb; 15.0 st)
- Style: Kickboxing
- Stance: Orthodox
- Team: SB Gym (2024 - Present); Mike's Gym (2023 - 2024); Khalid's Gym (2021 - Present); Choukoud Gym (2013-2021)
- Trainer: Said El Badaoui; Khalid Chennouf
- Years active: 2019 - present

Kickboxing record
- Total: 26
- Wins: 23
- By knockout: 15
- Losses: 3
- By knockout: 0

Mohamed Touchassie (born October 20, 2001) is a Dutch-Moroccan kickboxer, currently signed with Glory, where he is the current light heavyweight champion and 2026 Glory Light Heavyweight Grand Prix winner. He has formerly competed for Enfusion, where he was the former World Welterweight Champion.

As of november 2026 he was the #2 ranked Light Heavyweight kickboxer in the world by Combat Press.

== Kickboxing career ==
=== Enfusion ===
==== Early career ====
Touchassie faced Josef Vít at Prague Fight Night on June 27, 2019. He won the fight by a third-round stoppage, forcing the referee to intervene after flooring Vít with a high knee.

Touchassie faced Damian Ori at Enfusion Cage Events 3 on September 25, 2020. He won the fight by a second-round knockout, after flooring Ori with a head kick early in the round.

Touchassie faced Mischa Eradus at Enfusion 100 on July 4, 2021. He won the fight by a second-round knockout.

Touchassie returned to Enfusion's cage fighting series in order to face Joe Johnson at Enfusion Cage Events 6 on September 3, 2021. He won the fight by a third-round knockout.

Touchassie faced the Glory veteran Remy "Robocop" Vectol at Enfusion 104 on November 12, 2021. He won the fight by a second-round stoppage.

Touchassie faced Bilal Bakhouche-Chareuf at Enfusion 105 on March 26, 2022. He won the fight by a second-round knockout.

==== Enfusion Welterweight champion ====
Touchassie faced the former 80 kg Enfusion champion Robin Ciric for the vacant Enfusion Welterweight World Championship at Enfusion 109 on June 18, 2022. He captured the inaugural title by unanimous decision.

Touchassie challenged the Fair Fight Welterweight (-77 kg) champion Maxim Sulgin at RCC Fair Fight 20 on February 18, 2023. He won the fight by majority decision.

Touchassie faced Soufian-Aoulad Abdelkhalek in the Last 16 of the 8TKO -80 kg tournament on March 18, 2023. He won the fight by a third-round knockout.

=== GLORY ===
Touchassie made his Glory debut against fellow debutante Eduard Aleksanyan at Glory 89 on October 7, 2023. He won the fight by a second-round technical knockout.

Touchassie challenged the reigning Glory Light Heavyweight champion Donegi Abena at Glory: Collision 6 on November 4, 2023. Touchassie stepped in as a short-notice replacement for Tarik Khbabez, who withdrew from the fight with an injury. He lost the fight by unanimous decision.

Touchassie faced Brice Kombou at Glory 90 on December 23, 2023. He won the fight by a first-round technical knockout.

Touchassie faced Sergej Braun at Glory 92 on May 18, 2024. He lost the fight by unanimous decision. Touchassie later revealed he had suffered a broken jaw during the bout.

Touchassie faced Michael Boapeah at Glory 96 on October 12, 2024. He lost the fight by unanimous decision.

Touchassie faced Serkan Ozcaglayan at Glory 100 on June 14, 2025. He won the fight by unanimous decision.

Touchassie faced Ali Cenik for the vacant 8TKO Light Heavyweight title at 8TKO #24 on January 31, 2026. He won the fight by a second-round technical knockout.

Touchassie faced Jimmy Livinus at Glory 107, on April 25, 2026. He won via unanimous decision.

Touchassie faced Bahram Rajabzadeh at Glory Collision 9, in the Quarterfinals of the Glory Light Heavyweight Grand Prix, where the winner would also win the vacant Glory Light Heavyweight Championship. He won the bout via unanimous decision. He faced Cem Cáceres in the Semifinals, winning another unanimous decision. He then faced former Glory Middleweight Champion Donovan Wisse in the Finals, winning an incredibly close split decision.

== Titles and accomplishments ==
- Glory
  - 2026 Glory Light Heavyweight Grand Prix Winner
  - 2026 Glory Light Heavyweight Champion
- Enfusion
  - 2022 Enfusion Welterweight World Champion
    - One successful title defense
  - 2025 8TKO Light Heavyweight Champion
- RCC Fair Fight
  - 2023 Fair Fight Welterweight Champion

== Kickboxing record ==
Professional Kickboxing record
23 Wins (15 (T)KOs), 3 Losses, 0 Draw
Date	Result	Opponent	Event	Location	Method	Round	Time
2026-12-12		(Morocco) Tarik Khbabez	Glory Collision 10	Arnhem, Netherlands			
Defending the Glory Light Heavyweight Championship.
2026-06-13	Win	(Suriname) Donovan Wisse	Glory Collision 9 - Light Heavyweight Grand Prix, Final	Rotterdam, Netherlands	Decision (Split)	3	3:00
Wins the 2026 Glory Light Heavyweight Grand Prix title and the vacant Glory Light Heavyweight Championship.
2026-06-13	Win	(Turkey) Cem Cáceres	Glory Collision 9 - Light Heavyweight Grand Prix, Semifinals	Rotterdam, Netherlands	Decision (Unanimous)	3	3:00
2026-06-13	Win	(Azerbaijan) Bahram Rajabzadeh	Glory Collision 9 - Light Heavyweight Grand Prix, Quarterfinals	Rotterdam, Netherlands	Decision (Unanimous)	3	3:00
2026-04-25	Win	(Nigeria) Jimmy Livinus	Glory 107	Rotterdam, Netherlands	Decision (Unanimous)	3	3:00
2026-01-31	Win	(Turkey) Ali Cenik	8TKO #24	Doetinchem, Netherlands	TKO (3 Knockdowns)	2	
Wins the vacant 8TKO Light Heavyweight title.
2025-10-05	Win	(Belgium) Mbamba Cauwenbergh	World Fighting League	The Hague, Netherlands	TKO (Punches)	2	
2025-06-14	Win	(Turkey) Serkan Ozcaglayan	Glory 100	Rotterdam, Netherlands	Decision (Unanimous)	3	3:00
2024-10-12	Loss	(Ghana) Michael Boapeah	Glory 96	Rotterdam, Netherlands	Decision (Unanimous)	3	3:00
2024-05-18	Loss	(Germany) Sergej Braun	Glory 92	Rotterdam, Netherlands	Decision (Unanimous)	3	3:00
2023-12-23	Win	(Cameroon) Brice Kombou	Glory 90	Rotterdam, Netherlands	TKO (3 Knockdowns)	1	1:52
2023-11-04	Loss	(Suriname) Donegi Abena	Glory: Collision 6	Arnhem, Netherlands	Decision (Unanimous)	5	3:00
For the Glory Light Heavyweight Championship.
2023-10-07	Win	(Bulgaria) Eduard Aleksanyan	Glory 89	Burgas, Bulgaria	TKO (3 Knockdowns)	2	2:00
2023-03-18	Win	(Morocco) Soufian-Aoulad Abdelkhalek	8TKO - 80 kg Last 16	Alkmaar, Netherlands	KO (Punches)	3	2:14
2023-02-18	Win	(Russia) Maxim Sulgin	RCC Fair Fight 20	Yekaterinburg, Russia	Decision (Unanimous)	5	3:00
Wins the Fair Fight Welterweight (-77 kg) title.
2022-12-16	Win	(Jordan) Abdallah Al Jabareen	Enfusion 117	Dubai, United Arab Emirates	KO (Left hook)	2	1:49
2022-11-05	Win	(Hungary) Dominik Bereczki	Enfusion 114	Amsterdam, Netherlands	KO (Knee to the body)	3	2:10
2022-09-24	Win	(Morocco) Soufiane el Ballouti	Enfusion 112	Eindhoven, Netherlands	Decision (Unanimous)	5	3:00
Defends the Enfusion Welterweight (-77kg) World Championship.
2022-06-18	Win	(Netherlands) Robin Ciric	Enfusion 109	Groningen, Netherlands	Decision (Unanimous)	5	3:00
Wins the vacant Enfusion Welterweight (-77kg) World Championship.
2022-05-14	Win	(Afghanistan) Hamid Rezaie	Enfusion 106	Arnhem, Netherlands	KO (Right hook)	1	1:06
2022-03-26	Win	(France) Bilal Bakhouche-Chareuf	Enfusion 105	Alkmaar, Netherlands	TKO (Punches to the body)	2	0:51
2021-11-12	Win	(France) Remy Vectol	Enfusion 104	Abu Dhabi, United Arab Emirates	TKO (Punches)	2	0:51
2021-09-03	Win	(England) Joe Johnson	Enfusion Cage Events 6	Alkmaar, Netherlands	TKO (Corner stoppage)	3	0:44
2021-07-04	Win	(Netherlands) Mischa Eradus	Enfusion 100	Alkmaar, Netherlands	TKO (Left hook to the body)	2	0:35
2020-09-27	Win	(Netherlands) Damian Ori	Enfusion Cage Events 3	Alkmaar, Netherlands	KO (Head kick)	2	0:10
2020-09-19	Win	(Netherlands) Barry van Diemen	Enfusion 97	Alkmaar, Netherlands	TKO	2	
2019-06-27	Win	(Czech Republic) Josef Vít	Prague Fight Night	Prague, Czech Republic	KO (Knee)	3	1:44
Legend: Win Loss Draw/No contest Notes

Amateur Kickboxing Record
38 Wins, 2 Losses
Date	Result	Opponent	Event	Location	Method	Round	Time
2019-10-25	Win	(Netherlands) Branko de Gouw	Fightclub Den Haag	Netherlands	Decision	3	3:00
2019-04-06	Win	(Netherlands) Hamza el Mesbahi	RHJC Promotions	Noordwijkerhout, Netherlands	Decision	3	3:00
2018-11-03	Win	(Netherlands) Quint Otten	GLOBAL FIGHTS II	The Hague, Netherlands	Decision	3	2:00
2018-04-25	Win	(Netherlands) Mohamed Bitbirnn	HITTEAM 5	The Hague, Netherlands	Decision	3	2:00
2017-10-29	Win	(Netherlands) Achmed Akoudad	FEARLESS 5	Wassenaar, Netherlands	Decision	3	2:00
Legend: Win Loss Draw/No contest Notes

== See also ==
- List of male kickboxers
