= Iuri Fernandes =

Portuguese kickboxer

- Born: Iuri Alexandre Barros Fernandes; 15 May 2002 (age 24); Carcavelos, Portugal
- Height: 186 cm (6 ft 1 in)
- Weight: 95 kg (209 lb; 15.0 st)
- Style: Kickboxing
- Stance: Orthodox
- Fighting out of: Lisbon, Portugal
- Team: K.O. Team
- Trainer: João Diogo
- Years active: 2023–present

Kickboxing record
- Total: 18
- Wins: 15
- By knockout: 9
- Losses: 3
- By knockout: 0
- Draws: 0

Iuri Fernandes (born 15 May 2002) is a Cape Verdean-Portuguese kickboxer. He is the reigning WAKO Pro K-1 World Cruiser Heavyweight Champion. He was the 2026 Senshi Light Heavyweight Grand Prix winner.

== Career ==
Fernandes started training in kickboxing at the age of ten under the tutelage of trainer João Diogo at the K.O. Team.

On April 27, 2024, Fernandes faced Anthony Valverde at Fight Night One 18 in France. He won the fight by unanimous decision.

On May 11, 2024, Fernandes faced Leon Gavanas at Steko's Fight Night. He won by second-round knockout with a flying knee.

Fernandes defeated Valeriy Bizyaev by unanimous decision at Ural FC 8 on October 16, 2024.

Fernandes faced Mohammed Hamdi for the second time on December 14, 2024, at UAM K-1 Pro Night. He lost the fight by unanimous decision.

On March 7, 2025, Fernandes faced Bogdan Stoica at DFS 26. He won the fight by split decision.

On April 26, 2024, Fernandes faced Zinedine Hameur-Lain at the Fight Night One 21 event for the FNO Light Heavyweight title. He won the fight by first-round technical knockout after Hameur-Lain injured his shoulder.

Fernandes faced Samuele Pugliese at Glory 100 on June 14, 2025, as a reserve fight for the Last Heavyweight Standing tournament. He won the fight by doctor stoppage in the second round.

Fernandes faced Michael Boapeah at Glory Collision 8 as part of a Light Heavyweight Tournament semifinal on December 13, 2025. He lost the fight by unanimous decision.

On April 25, 2026, Fernandes faced Ștefan Lătescu at Glory 107. He lost the fight by unanimous decision.

Fernandes faced Modestas Juodpusis at FCE 5 on June 18, 2026. He won the fight by first-round knockout with calf kicks.

On September 5, 2026, Fernandes entered an 8-man light heavyweight tournament happening in one night at Senshi 33 in Varna, Bulgaria. In the quarterfinals he defeated Alexandru Burduja by first round knockout. In the semifinals he defeated Yuri Farças by second-round technical knockout after scoring two knockdowns. In the final he defeated Ramon Quirini by first-round knockout with a calf kick.

On October 5, 2026, Fernandes faced Fodiye Cissé at UAE Warriors 73 with the WAKO Pro K-1 World Cruiser Heavyweight title at stake. He won the fight by unanimous decision.

== Championships and accomplishments ==
=== Professional ===
- Fight Night One
  - 2025 FNO K-1 Light Heavyweight Champion
- SENSHI
  - 2026 SENSHI Light Heavyweight Gnrad Prix Winner
- World Association of Kickboxing Organizations
  - 2026 WAKO Pro K-1 World Cruiser Heavyweight (-94.1 kg) Champion

=== Amateur ===
- World Association of Kickboxing Organizations
  - 2024 WAKO European Championship K-1 Super Heavyweight (+91 kg) (bronze)
- International Sport Kickboxing Association
  - 2019 ISKA Amateur World Championship K-1 & Muay Thai (silver)

== Kickboxing record ==
Professional kickboxing record
15 Wins (9 (T)KOs), 3 Losses, 0 Draws
Date	Result	Opponent	Event	Location	Method	Round	Time
2026-10-05	Win	(France) Fodiye Cissé	UAE Warriors 73	Cascais, Portugal	Decision (unanimous)	5	3:00
Won the vacant WAKO Pro K-1 World Cruiser Heavyweight (-94.1 kg) title.
2026-09-05	Win	(Italy) Ramon Quirini	Senshi 33 - Light Heavyweight Grand Prix, Final	Varna, Bulgaria	KO (calf kick)	1	
Won the SENSHI Light Heavyweight Grand Prix.
2026-09-05	Win	(Romania) Yuri Farças	Senshi 33 - Light Heavyweight Grand Prix, Semifinals	Varna, Bulgaria	TKO (2 knockdowns)	1	2:59
2026-09-05	Win	(Moldova) Alexandru Burduja	Senshi 33 - Light Heavyweight Grand Prix, Quarterfinals	Varna, Bulgaria	KO (left hook to the body)	1	2:40
2026-06-18	Win	(Lithuania) Modestas Juodpusis	FCE 5	Lisbon, Portugal	KO (calf kicks)	1	
2026-04-25	Loss	(Romania) Ștefan Lătescu	Glory 107	Rotterdam, Netherlands	Decision (unanimous)	3	3:00
2025-12-13	Loss	(Ghana) Michael Boapeah	Glory Collision 8 - Light Heavyweight Tournament, Semifinals	Arnhem, Netherlands	Decision (unanimous)	3	3:00
2025-06-14	Win	(Italy) Samuele Pugliese	Glory 100, Last Heavyweight Standing, reserve	Rotterdam, Netherlands	TKO (doctor stoppage)	2	2:43
2025-04-26	Win	(France) Zinedine Hameur-Lain	Fight Night One 21	Saint-Étienne, France	TKO (shoulder injury)	1	
Won the vacant Fight Night One Light Heavyweight title.
2025-03-07	Win	(Romania) Bogdan Stoica	DFS 26	Râmnicu Vâlcea, Romania	Decision (split)	3	3:00
2024-12-14	Loss	(Spain) Mohammed Hamdi	UAM K-1 Pro Night	Abu Dhabi, United Arab Emirates	Decision (unanimous)	3	3:00
2024-10-16	Win	(Russia) Valeriy Bizyaev	Ural FC 8	Perm, Russia	Decision (unanimous)	3	3:00
2024-06-27	Win	(Spain) Mohammed Hamdi	FCE 3	Lisbon, Portugal	Decision (unanimous)	3	3:00
2024-05-11	Win	(Germany) Leon Gavanas	Steko's Fight Night	Munich, Germany	KO (jumping knee)	2	
2024-04-27	Win	(France) Anthony Valverde	Fight Night One 18	Saint-Chamond, France	Decision (unanimous)	3	3:00
2024-03-03	Win	(France) Mohamed Bilel	Gala KO Team	Estoril, Portugal	TKO (retirement)	2	3:00
2023-10-15	Win	(France) Florent Gautier	Gala KO Team	Estoril, Portugal	Decision (unanimous)	3	3:00
2023-04-29	Win	(France) Kevin Bavelard	Fight Night One 15	Saint-Étienne, France	KO (low kick)	2	
Legend: Win Loss Draw/No contest Notes

Amateur kickboxing record
Date	Result	Opponent	Event	Location	Method	Round	Time
2025-08-12	Loss	(Uzbekistan) Khusankhon Baratov	2025 World Games - K-1 Tournament, Quarterfinals	Chengdu, China	Decision (2:1)	3	2:00
2024-11-07	Loss	(Ukraine) Roman Shcherbatiuk	2024 WAKO European Championships, Semifinals	Athens, Greece	Decision (split)	3	2:00
Won 2024 WAKO European Championship K-1 Super Heavyweight (+91 kg) Bronze Medal.
2024-11-06	Win	(Croatia) Anto Siric	2024 WAKO European Championships, Quarterfinals	Athens, Greece	Decision (unanimous)	3	2:00
2023-11-	Loss	(Ukraine) Roman Shcherbatiuk	2023 WAKO World Championship, Quarterfinals	Albufeira, Portugal	Decision (split)	3	2:00
2023-11-	Win	(Germany) Alkis Yilmaz	2023 WAKO World Championship, First Round	Albufeira, Portugal	Decision (unanimous)	3	2:00
2021-12-04	Loss	(Czech Republic) Vít Vladař	WAKO K-1 World Grand Prix 2021, Semifinals	Prague, Czech Republic	Decision (unanimous)	3	2:00
Legend: Win Loss Draw/No contest Notes

== See also ==
- List of male kickboxers
