= Nabil Khachab =

Dutch Moroccan kickboxer

- Born: 9 September 2000 (age 26); Amersfoort, Netherlands
- Nickname: The Tank
- Height: 1.88 m (6 ft 2 in)
- Weight: 159.7 kg (352 lb; 25 st 2 lb)
- Style: Kickboxing
- Stance: Orthodox
- Fighting out of: Utrecht, Netherlands
- Team: SB Gym
- Trainer: Said El Badaoui
- Years active: 2019 - present

Kickboxing record
- Total: 40
- Wins: 32
- By knockout: 4
- Losses: 7
- Draws: 1

Nabil Khachab (born 9 September 2000) is a Moroccan-Dutch kickboxer, currently competing in the heavyweight division of Glory.

== Kickboxing career ==
Khachab made his Glory debut against Uku Jürjendal at Glory 83 on 11 February 2023. He won the fight by unanimous decision.

Khachab faced Sofian Laidouni at Glory 84 on 11 March 2023. He lost the fight by unanimous decision.

Khachab faced Nikola Filipović in a Glory Heavyweight tournament qualifier at Glory 90 on 23 December 2023. He won the fight by unanimous decision.

Khachab took part in the Glory Heavyweight Grand Prix, held on 9 March 2024. Despite overcoming the two-time Glory Heavyweight title challenger Benjamin Adegbuyi by unanimous decision in the tournament quarterfinals, he was himself eliminated by unanimous decision by the eventual tournament winner Rico Verhoeven in the semifinals.

Khachab faced Buğra Erdoğan at Glory 96 on 12 October 2024, winning via unanimous decision.

Khachab took part in the Glory 99 “Heavyweight Last Man Standing Tournament” where 32 heavyweight fighters competed on 5 April 2025, in Rotterdam, Netherlands. He faced Miloš Cvjetićanin, losing via split decision.

Khachab faced Nathan Cook at Glory 103, winning via unanimous decision. In the process, he scored his first, and to date only, two knockdowns of his Glory career in round 2.

Khachab faced Sofian Laidouni at Glory 104, on 11 October 2025. He lost the fight via unanimous decision.

Khachab faced Errol Koning at Glory 107, on 25 April 2026. He won the fight via split decision, with the fight needing to go to an extra round to determine a winner.

== Fight record ==
Professional kickboxing record
32 Wins (0(T)KOs), 7 Losses, 1 Draw
| Date | Result | Opponent | Event | Location | Method | Round | Time |
| 2026-10-17 | Win | (Romania) Ionuț Iancu | Glory 110 | Antwerp, Belgium | Decision (Unanimous) | 3 | 3:00 |
| 2026-04-25 | Win | (Netherlands) Errol Koning | Glory 107 | Rotterdam, Netherlands | Ext.R Decision (Split) | 4 | 3:00 |
| 2025-10-11 | Loss | (Algeria) Sofian Laidouni | Glory 104 - Last Heavyweight Standing Qualification Round, Semifinals | Rotterdam, Netherlands | Decision (Unanimous) | 3 | 3:00 |
| 2025-08-23 | Win | (United Kingdom) Nathan Cook | Glory 103 - Last Heavyweight Standing Opening Round Phase 2 | Rotterdam, Netherlands | Decision (Unanimous) | 3 | 3:00 |
| 2025-04-05 | Loss | (Serbia) Miloš Cvjetićanin | Glory 99 - Last Heavyweight Standing Opening Round | Rotterdam, Netherlands | Decision (Split) | 3 | 3:00 |
| 2024-10-12 | Win | (Turkey) Buğra Erdoğan | Glory 96 | Rotterdam, Netherlands | Decision (Unanimous) | 3 | 3:00 |
| 2024-03-09 | Loss | (Netherlands) Rico Verhoeven | Glory Heavyweight Grand Prix, Tournament Semifinal | Arnhem, Netherlands | Decision (Unanimous) | 3 | 3:00 |
| 2024-03-09 | Win | (Romania) Benjamin Adegbuyi | Glory Heavyweight Grand Prix, Tournament Quarterfinal | Arnhem, Netherlands | Decision (Unanimous) | 3 | 3:00 |
| 2023-12-23 | Win | (Serbia) Nikola Filipović | Glory 90, Tournament Qualifier | Rotterdam, Netherlands | Decision (Unanimous) | 3 | 3:00 |
| 2023-06-17 | Win | (Germany) Vladimir Toktasynov | Glory: Collision 5 | Rotterdam, Netherlands | Decision (Unanimous) | 3 | 3:00 |
| 2023-03-11 | Loss | (Algeria) Sofian Laidouni | Glory 84 | Rotterdam, Netherlands | Decision (Unanimous) | 3 | 3:00 |
| 2023-02-11 | Win | (Estonia) Uku Jürjendal | Glory 83 | Essen, Germany | Decision (Unanimous) | 3 | 3:00 |
| 2022-10-22 | Win | (Bulgaria) Lazar Todev | Enfusion 113 | Wuppertal, Germany | Decision (Unanimous) | 3 | 3:00 |
| 2022-05-14 | Loss | (Guinea) Mory Kromah | Enfusion 106 | Wuppertal, Germany | Decision (Unanimous) | 3 | 3:00 |
| 2021-10-24 | Win | | Enfusion Cage Events 7 | Wuppertal, Germany | Decision (Unanimous) | 3 | 3:00 |
| 2019-12-13 | Win | (Bosnia and Herzegovina) Dylan Rajic | Enfusion Talents 78 | Alkmaar, Netherlands | Decision (Unanimous) | 3 | 3:00 |
| 2019-11-30 | Win | (Netherlands) Winfried Jops | Enfusion Rookies | Arnhem, Netherlands | Decision (Unanimous) | 3 | 3:00 |
| 2019-04-20 | Win | (Morocco) Oussama Laaraj | FSL Fight Night | Emmen, Netherlands | Decision (Unanimous) | 3 | 3:00 |
Legend: Win Loss Draw/No contest Notes

Amateur kickboxing record
| Date | Result | Opponent | Event | Location | Method | Round | Time |
|---|---|---|---|---|---|---|---|
| 2018-05-12 | Loss | (Netherlands) Winfried Jops | Global Fights Holland I | The Hague, Netherlands | Decision | 3 | 2:00 |
| 2010-12-31 | Draw | (Morocco) Brahim Said | New Years Fight Night | Amersfoort, Netherlands | Decision | 1 | 3:00 |
Legend: Win Loss Draw/No contest Notes

== See also ==
- List of male kickboxers
