= Jimmy Livinus =

Dutch kickboxer

- Born: Jimmy Livinus Omani; 1995 (age 30–31); Leeuwarden, Netherlands
- Height: 1.95 m (6 ft 5 in)
- Weight: 95 kg (209 lb; 15.0 st)
- Stance: Orthodox
- Fighting out of: Amsterdam, Netherlands
- Team: Sityodtong Amsterdam

Kickboxing record
- Total: 17
- Wins: 12
- By knockout: 6
- Losses: 3
- By knockout: 2
- Draws: 2

Jimmy Livinus Omani is a Dutch-Nigerian kickboxer. He has fought in Golden Fighter Championship and Enfusion.

As of December 2023, he was the #8 ranked light heavyweight kickboxer in the world by Combat Press.

== Career ==
Livinus faced Alin Văcareanu on November 29, 2019, at GFC 6 in Timișoara, Romania. He won the fight by split decision.

Livinus faced Iaroslav Linnic on June 25, 2021, at GFC 7 in Romania. He won the fight by first-round technical knockout.

Livinus faced Lukas Achterberg at Senshi 19 on November 25, 2023. He won the fight by a third-round knockout.

Livnius faced Mbamba Cauwenbergh, as a replacement for the injured Adrian Niculae, at SENSHI 22 on July 6, 2024. He won the fight by a first-round knockout.

Livnius faced Miloš Cvjetićanin at Glory 95 on September 21, 2024. He lost the fight by a first-round knockout.

== Kickboxing record ==
kickboxing record
12 Wins (6 (T)KOs), 3 Losses, 2 Draw
Date	Result	Opponent	Event	Location	Method	Round	Time
2026-06-13	Win	(Turkey) Serkan Ozcaglayan	Glory Collision 9 - Light Heavyweight Grand Prix, reserve	Rotterdam, Netherlands	Decision (Unanimous)	3	3:00
2026-04-25	Loss	(Morocco) Mohamed Touchassie	Glory 107	Rotterdam, Netherlands	Decision (Unanimous)	3	3:00
2025-02-22	Loss	(Lithuania) Sergej Maslobojev	UTMA 11	Kaunas, Lithuania	KO (Punches)	2	1:10
2024-09-21	Loss	(Serbia) Miloš Cvjetićanin	Glory 95	Zagreb, Croatia	KO (Right hook)	1	2:29
2024-07-06	Win	(Belgium) Mbamba Cauwenbergh	Senshi 22	Varna, Bulgaria	KO (Knee to the head)	1	1:59
2023-11-25	Win	(Germany) Lukas Achterberg	Senshi 19	Varna, Bulgaria	KO (Knees)	3	2:10
2023-05-20	Draw	(Netherlands) Bas Vorstenbosch	A1 World Combat	Eindhoven, Netherlands	Decision	3	3:00
2023-03-10	Win	(Belgium) Bertrand Bertoni	Battle Arena	Zwevegem, Belgium	TKO (Knee to the head)	1	
2022-06-06	Win	(Netherlands) Yasin Güren	Fightclub Den Haag	The Hague, Netherlands	Decision	3	3:00
2022-03-26	Win	(Morocco) Chahid Chaquibi	Enfusion 105	Alkmaar, Netherlands	KO (Knee to the body)	1	2:15
2021-06-24	Win	(Moldova) Iaroslav Linnic	GFC 7	Bucharest, Romania	TKO (retirement)	1	3:00
2020-02-29	Draw	(Guinea) Mory Kromah	Enfusion Talents 79	Eindhoven, Netherlands	Decision	3	3:00
2019-11-29	Win	(Romania) Alin Văcăreanu	GFC 6	Timișoara, Romania	Decision (Split)	3	3:00
Legend: Win Loss Draw/No contest Notes

== See also ==
- List of male kickboxers
