= Bahram Rajabzadeh =

Iranian and Azerbaijani kickboxer (born 1991)

- Born: Bahram Rajabzadeh; 3 August 1991 (age 35); Urmia, Iran
- Native name: Bəhram Xudaverdi oğlu Rəcəbzadə
- Nickname: The Golden Wolf
- Citizenship: Iranian; Azerbaijani
- Height: 1.87 m (6 ft 1 1/2 in)
- Weight: 95 kg (209 lb; 14 st 13 lb)
- Division: Light heavyweight Heavyweight
- Style: Kickboxing
- Stance: Orthodox
- Team: Orion Sports Club
- Trainer: Çingiz Eyvazov

Kickboxing record
- Total: 80
- Wins: 73
- By knockout: 64
- Losses: 7

Bahram Rajabzadeh Shahbandloi (Persian: بهرام رجب زاده شهبندلویی, Azerbaijani: Bəhram Rəcəbzadə Şahbəndloi, known professionally as Bahram Rajabzadeh; born 3 August 1991) is an Iranian and Azerbaijani kickboxer. He currently competes in the Light Heavyweight and Heavyweight divisions of GLORY, where he was a GLORY Light Heavyweight title challenger. He is a WAKO world champion..

== Background and career ==
Bahram Rajabzadeh was born in 1991 in Urmia, Iran. He started doing sports at the age of 7.

In 2016, he became the champion of Azerbaijan in kickboxing. He was invited to Azerbaijan in December 2015 at the invitation of the Orion Sports Club and currently represents Azerbaijan.

He married in 2016, and his wife is also an athlete. He has one child.

In 2019, Rajabzadeh signed with GLORY. He made his debut against Sergej Maslobojev at Glory 69: Düsseldorf. He lost the fight by unanimous decision.

Rajabzadeh faced karate standout Jan Soukup at XFN LEGENDS on 29 March 2019. He won the fight by a second-round knockout.

Rajabzadeh participated in the 2022 World Games, competing in the -91 kg kickboxing division. He captured the gold medal after beating both Roman Shcherbatiuk and Anto Širić by unanimous decision.

Rajabzadeh faced the former two-weight Enfusion champion Luis Tavares at Glory 86 on 27 May 2023. He won the fight by a first-round knockout.

Rajabzadeh took part in the a Glory heavyweight qualification tournament at Glory 87 on 19 August 2023, with the winner being granted a spot in the a Glory 16-Man heavyweight tournament later in the year. He overcame Mohammed Amine by a second-round technical knockout in the semifinals and Uku Jürjendal in the finals to qualify for the 2023 year end Glory Heavyweight Grand Prix.

Rajabzadeh faced the one-time Glory Heavyweight title challenger Tariq Osaro in the quarterfinals of the Glory Heavyweight Grand Prix on 9 March 2024. He won the fight by unanimous decision. Rajabzadeh faced Levi Rigters in the tournament semifinals. He lost the fight by unanimous decision.

Rajabzadeh faced Kevin Oumar at Glory 91 on 27 April 2024, in his return to the light heavyweight division. He won the fight by a third-round technical knockout.

Rajabzadeh was expected to face Ștefan Lătescu at Glory 94 on 31 August 2024. Rajabzadeh was rescheduled to face Levi Rigters in a GLORY Heavyweight title eliminator at Glory 95 on 21 September 2024, as a replacement for Antonio Plazibat, who was forced to withdraw with an injury.

Rajabzadeh took part in the Glory 99 "Heavyweight Last Man Standing Tournament", where 32 heavyweight fighters compete on 5 April 2025, in Rotterdam, Netherlands. He was booked to face Brian Douwes. Rajabzadeh won the fight by a first-round technical knockout.

Rajabzadeh faced Asdren Gashi in the semifinals of the Last Heavyweight Standing Qualification Round tournament, held at Glory 100 on 14 June 2025. He won the fight by a first-round knockout. Rajabzadeh faced Mory Kromah in the finals of the one-day tournament. He lost the fight by a first-round knockout.

Rajabzadeh faced Tarik Khbabez for the vacant Glory Light Heavyweight Championship at Glory 104 on 11 October 2025. He lost the fight by majority decision.

Rajabzadeh faced Cristian Ristea at Glory 105 on 7 February 2026. He won the fight by a first-round knockout via punches.

Rajabzadeh was scheduled to face the Glory Middleweight Champion Donovan Wisse at Glory 107, for the again vacant Glory Light Heavyweight Championship, but was forced to withdraw after suffering an injury. He was replaced by the reigning Glory Welterweight Champion, Chico Kwasi, who went on to fight and beat Wisse for Wisse's Middleweight Championship.

Rajabzadeh entered the Glory Light Heavyweight Grand Prix at Glory Collision 9, on 6 June 2025, for the still vacant Glory Light Heavyweight Championship. He faced Mohamed Touchassie in the Quarterfinals, losing the bout via unanimous decision. Touchassie went on to win the entire Tournament, as well as the Light Heavyweight Championship.

== Championships and accomplishments ==
- GLORY
  - 2023 GLORY Breakout Fighter of the Year
  - 2023 GLORY Heavyweight Grand Prix Qualifying Tournament Winner
  - 2024 GLORY Light Heavyweight Grand Prix Runner-up
  - 2025 Fight of the Year (vs. Tarik Khbabez at Glory 104)

Awards

- 2025 Beyond Kickboxing Fight of the Year (vs. Tarik Khbabez)

== Fight record ==
Professional Kickboxing Record
73 Wins (64 (T)KOs), 7 Losses, 0 Draws
Date	Result	Opponent	Event	Location	Method	Round	Time
2026-12-12		(Iran) Sina Karimian	Glory Collision 10	Arnhem, Netherlands			
2026-06-13	Loss	(Morocco) Mohamed Touchassie	Glory Collision 9 - Light Heavyweight Grand Prix, Quarterfinals	Rotterdam, Netherlands	Decision (Unanimous)	3	3:00
2026-02-07	Win	(Romania) Cristian Ristea	Glory 105	Arnhem, Netherlands	KO (Punches)	1	0:31
2025-10-11	Loss	(Morocco) Tarik Khbabez	Glory 104	Rotterdam, Netherlands	Decision (Majority)	5	3:00
For the vacant Glory Light Heavyweight Championship.
2025-06-14	Loss	(Guinea) Mory Kromah	Glory 100, Last Heavyweight Standing Qualification Round, Final	Rotterdam, Netherlands	KO (Flying knee)	1	2:14
Fails to qualify for the 2025 Glory Last Heavyweight Standing - Final Tournament.
2025-06-14	Win	(Albania) Asdren Gashi	Glory 100, Last Heavyweight Standing Qualification Round, Semifinals	Rotterdam, Netherlands	KO (Left hook)	1	0:53
2025-04-05	Win	(Netherlands) Brian Douwes	Glory 99 - Last Heavyweight Standing, Opening Round	Rotterdam, Netherlands	TKO (3 Knockdowns)	1	2:41
2024-12-07	Win	(North Macedonia) Daniel Stefanovski	Glory Collision 7	Arnhem, Netherlands	TKO (3 Knockdowns)	1	2:30
2024-09-21	Loss	(Netherlands) Levi Rigters	Glory 95	Zagreb, Croatia	TKO (Doctor stoppage)	3	2:23
Glory Heavyweight title eliminator.
2024-06-08	Loss	(Suriname) Donegi Abena	Glory Light Heavyweight Grand Prix, Final	Rotterdam, Netherlands	TKO (Referee stop/punches)	1	2:43
For the 2024 Glory Light Heavyweight Grand Prix title.
2024-06-08	Win	(Lithuania) Sergej Maslobojev	Glory Light Heavyweight Grand Prix, Semifinals	Rotterdam, Netherlands	TKO (retirement)	2	0:20
2024-06-08	Win	(Morocco) Ibrahim El Bouni	Glory Light Heavyweight Grand Prix, Quarterfinals	Rotterdam, Netherlands	TKO (Flying knee)	1	2:02
2024-04-27	Win	(France) Kevin Oumar	Glory 91	Paris, France	KO (Right hook)	3	0:35
2024-03-09	Loss	(Netherlands) Levi Rigters	Glory Heavyweight Grand Prix, Semifinals	Arnhem, Netherlands	Decision (Unanimous)	3	3:00
2024-03-09	Win	(Nigeria) Tariq Osaro	Glory Heavyweight Grand Prix, Quarterfinals	Arnhem, Netherlands	Decision (Unanimous)	3	3:00
2023-08-19	Win	(Estonia) Uku Jürjendal	Glory 87 - Heavyweight Tournament, Final	Rotterdam, Netherlands	Decision (Unanimous)	3	3:00
Wins the Glory Heavyweight Tournament and qualifies for the 2024 Glory Heavyweight Grand Prix.
2023-08-19	Win	(Morocco) Mohammed Amine	Glory 87 - Heavyweight Tournament, Semifinal	Rotterdam, Netherlands	TKO (2 Knockdowns)	2	2:59
2023-06-20	Win	(Liberia) Moribah Kosiah	Loca Fight Club	Istanbul, Turkey	KO (head Kick)	1	2:28
2023-06-11	Win	(Egypt) Ali Salah	International Kickboxing Fight Night	Cairo, Egypt	KO (Knee)	1	0:58
2023-05-27	Win	(Cape Verde) Luis Tavares	Glory 86	Essen, Germany	KO (head kick)	1	1:58
2022-07-02	Win	(Uzbekistan) Akhmat Mamadjanov	Loca Fight Club	Istanbul, Turkey	KO (High kick)	1	1:06
2022-04-30	Win	(Turkey) Cengizhan Kuru	Loca Fight Club	Istanbul, Turkey	TKO (retirement)	2	3:00
2021-08-27	Win	(Netherlands) Kilat Bilal Hallie	AVATAR COMBAT CUP	Turkey	TKO (Corner stoppage)	1	
2021-06-26	Win	(Turkey) Mehmet Özer	Akin Dovus Arenasi	Istanbul, Turkey	TKO (Leg injury)	2	2:00
2019-10-12	Loss	(Lithuania) Sergej Maslobojev	Glory 69: Düsseldorf	Düsseldorf, Germany	Decision (Unanimous)	3	3:00
2019-03-29	Win	(Czech Republic) Jan Soukup	XFN LEGENDS	Prague, Czech Republic	KO (Right cross)	2	0:18
2018-03-11	Win	(Belgium) Mounir Hammoudi	Orion Fight Arena	Koblenz, Germany	TKO (Doctor stoppage)	2	1:53
2017-10-21	Win	(Turkey) İbrahim Giydirir	Orion Fight Arena	Ankara, Turkey	TKO (Low kicks)	1	
2016-09-25	Win	(Netherlands) Bas Vorstenbosch	Fight Vision	Baku, Azerbaijan			
Wins the A.F.S.O. Oriental Rules Superheavyweight International Title.
Legend: Win Loss Draw/No contest Notes

Amateur Kickboxing Record
Date	Result	Opponent	Event	Location	Method	Round	Time
2022-07-14	Win	(Croatia) Anto Širić	World Games 2022, Kickboxing Final +91 kg	Birmingham, Alabama, United States	Decision (3:0)	3	2:00
Wins 2022 World Games Kickboxing Gold Medal +91 kg.
2022-07-13	Win	(Ukraine) Roman Shcherbatiuk	World Games 2022, Kickboxing Semi Final +91 kg	Birmingham, Alabama, United States	Decision (3:0)	3	2:00
2021-10-	Loss	(Ukraine) Roman Shcherbatiuk	W.A.K.O World Championships 2021, K-1 Quarter Final +91 kg	Jesolo, Italy	Decision (2:1)	3	2:00
2021-10-	Win	(Brazil) Ariel Machado	W.A.K.O World Championships 2021, K-1 1/8 Final +91 kg	Jesolo, Italy	Decision (3:0)	3	2:00
2018-10-20	Loss	(Croatia) Antonio Plazibat	W.A.K.O European Championships 2018, K-1 Final +91 kg	Bratislava, Slovakia	Decision (2:1)	3	2:00
Wins W.A.K.O. European Championship '18 K-1 Silver Medal +91 kg.
2018-10-19	Win	(Ukraine) Roman Holovatuk	W.A.K.O European Championships 2018, K-1 Semi Finals +91 kg	Bratislava, Slovakia	Decision (2:1)	3	2:00
2018-10-18	Win	(Poland) Michal Blawdziewicz	W.A.K.O European Championships 2018, K-1 Quarter Finals +91 kg	Bratislava, Slovakia	Decision (3:0)	3	2:00
2017-11-12	Win	(Poland) Michal Blawdziewicz	W.A.K.O World Championships 2017, K-1 Final +91 kg	Budapest, Hungary	Decision (3:0)	3	2:00
Wins W.A.K.O. World Championship '18 K-1 Gold Medal +91 kg.
2017-11-10	Win	(Serbia) Nikola Filipovic	W.A.K.O World Championships 2017, K-1 Semi Final +91 kg	Budapest, Hungary	Decision (2:1)	3	2:00
2017-11-08	Win	(Ukraine) Roman Holovatuk	W.A.K.O World Championships 2017, K-1 Quarter Final +91 kg	Budapest, Hungary	Decision	3	2:00
2016-10-25	Loss	(Serbia) Saša Polugić	W.A.K.O European Championships 2016, K-1 Quarter Final +91 kg	Maribor, Slovenia	Decision	3	2:00
2016-10-23	Win	(France) Jose Poteau	W.A.K.O European Championships 2016, K-1 Opening Round +91 kg	Maribor, Slovenia	Decision	3	2:00
Legend: Win Loss Draw/No contest Notes
