= Davide Armanini =

Italian kickboxer

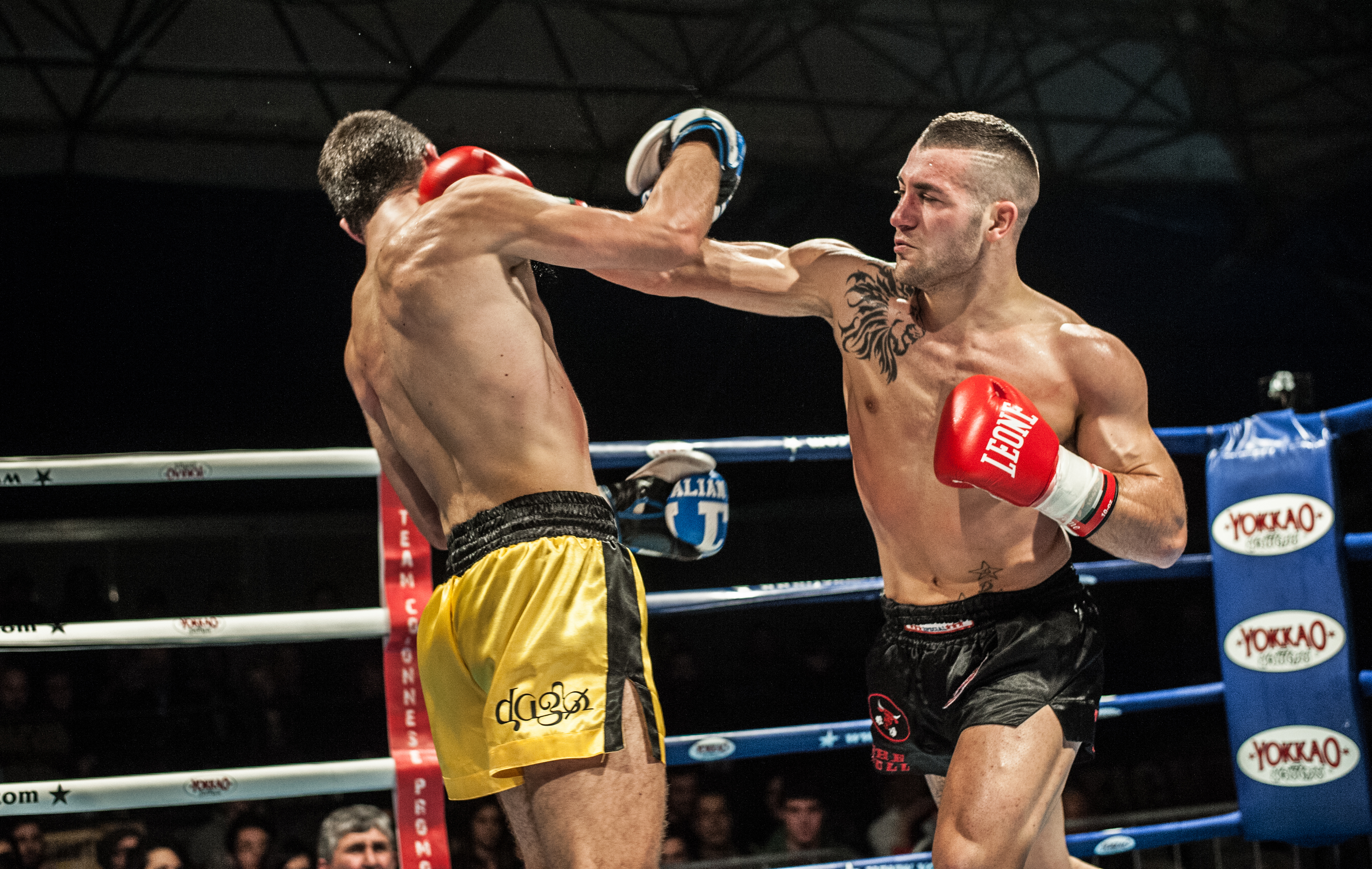
- Born: Davide Armanini; December 10, 1991 (age 34); Rome, Italy
- Height: 170 cm (5 ft 7 in)
- Team: Roma Fight Club
- Trainer: Andrea Ferioli

Kickboxing record
- Total: 28
- Wins: 26
- By knockout: 14
- Losses: 2
- By knockout: 1

Davide Armanini (born 10 December 1991) is an Italian kickboxer who fights for the Roman team "Roma Fight Club".

Active in various combat disciplines (such as kickboxing and boxing), he is the first Italian athlete called to join the Dutch promotion Enfusion. He is a WTKA K1 75 kg world champion an Italian 81 kg FederKombat 1st series champion and a Wako K1 Middleweight world champion. He is nicknamed "The Bull" for the way he charges at his opponents during matches.

== Biography ==
Davide Armanini was born in Rome in 1991. From a very young age he dedicated himself to sports, in particular Taekwondo, earning himself a black belt, and to cycling, which he dedicated himself to until the age of 19 with a good career as an amateur.

At 19, on the advice of his brother who was already practicing both kickboxing and K1, he began taking K1 courses with Lorenzo Mosca. His first exchanges in the ring, even against athletes with greater experience, weight, and technical preparation, convinced him to continue and perfect his skills.

In 2011, due to his work schedule, he started training at Roma Fight Club where he trained in the afternoons. His coach, seeing his potential, suggested he switch to the evening shift taught by Andrea Ferioli, his current K1 and Muay Thai coach. "The evening shift," Davide says, "was a bit inconvenient because of my job: sometimes I'd finish training very late, returning home at midnight and then waking up at 2:30 to go to work."

== Kickboxing career ==
=== 2011 - 2015: Early Career ===
In 2011, Davide Armanini competed in his first amateur match against Gabriele Casella the bout ended in a points defeat. Over the next two years, following the development program outlined by his coach Andrea Ferioli, he collected 14 wins and no losses. In 2013, he perfected his boxing technique with coach Massimo Enrico.

In 2014, Davide Armanini won the FIKB interregional champion title (with a first-round knockout victory over Danilo Berni) and the Italian champion title (FIKB first series) with a third-round knockout victory over Andrea Fontana. This was his last amateur bout finishing his Amateur career with 16 wins and 1 loss.

His first professional fight, also in 2014, was against Francesco Palermo, an experienced fighter with over 60 fights under his belt. The match ended in a second-round knockout victory, Davide Armanini thus became the Italian FIKB Elite champion.

On 16 November 2014 during the “Fighting Spirit Muay Thai 3” in his first international match he beat the Dutch athlete Redouan Daoudi by KO in the second round.

In 2015 he participated in the "Superkombat New Heroes" tournament, defeating Francesco Palermo in the semifinal and Gabriele Galasso in the final.

=== 2016 - 2018: WTKA K1 World Title and Bellator Debut ===
On April 10, 2016, he won the European K1 Rules WTKA title against Frenchman Mehdi Kada, an athlete with over 60 fights under his belt, ended with a first-round knockout victory.

On March 26, 2017, he won the WTKA 75 kg K1 World title. The match against Angaar Afghaan, one of the most highly rated fighters of Nieky Holzken's Dutch team, ended after 5 rounds with a points victory for Davide Armanini.

On March 24, 2018, Davide Armanini successfully defended his WTKA K1 World Champion title in a tough match against Armenian athlete Armen Hovhannisyan, from the Dutch Ciric team, at Fight Club Roma.

In July 2018, he made his Belator debut against Fatmir Gordi. He won via a unanimous decision.

=== 2018 - 2021: Enfusion ===
On November 21, 2018, Davide Armanini signed with the Dutch promotion Enfusion, becoming the first Italian athlete to be part of this organization.

On December 1, 2018, at his debut on the Enfusion circuit (in Trinec, Czech Republic), he beat Matous Kohout by KO in the second round, earning him a ranking as 5th in the Enfusion 75 kg category.

On March 23, 2019, in the first Italian stage of the Enfusion circuit, after the three regulation rounds and the extra-round provided for by the Enfusion rules in the event of a draw, he beat the Dutch athlete Regilio van den Ent on points.

On May 25, 2019, at the Candy Arena in Monza, as part of the Oktagon 2019 event, he knocked out the Portuguese athlete Diogo Calado in the first round.

On October 26. 2019, Davide Armanini lost his first fight as a professional in a non-title bout against Endy Semeleer the Enfusion 75 kg World Champion by TKO in the 3rd round.

=== 2021 - 2022: the Italian FederKombat title and the Wako Pro world title ===
After a long forced break due to the national health protocols for COVID-19, Davide Armanini returned to the ring on May 16, 2021, at the 1st series FederKombat (formerly FIKBMS) Italian Absolute Championships, beating Giuseppe Caruso on points in the quarterfinals and Luca Carnevali in the semifinals; in the final, he defeated Emanuele Lulaj on points to win the title of 1st series FederKombat Italian Champion -81 kg category.

Two months later, on July 11, 2021, Davide fought Estonian Maikel Astur for the WAKO Pro K1 75 kg World Title. He won by TKO in the fourth round, after a match full of very tough exchanges in which Armanini prevailed thanks to the power of his arm strikes and the effectiveness of his low kicks.

On December 18, 2021, Davide Armanini beat Giannis Boukis via a Second round TKO in at Fight Clubbing 28.

On May 14, 2022, Davide Armanini beat Levan Guruli via a third-round TKO in the Main Event of Fight Clubbing 29, defending his WAKO PRO World Champion belt and winning the Fight Clubbing Champion belt.

On December 17, 2022, at Fight Clubbing 30, Davide Armanini earned his total 40th career victory in 42 fights. The match pitted him against the powerful Spanish fighter Aixay Hernandez, the WAKO Pro national champion. Armanini won via Decision.

== Titles and accomplishments ==
- Fight Clubbing
  - 2022 Fight Clubbing Middleweight World Champion
- World Association of Kickboxing Organizations
  - 2021 WAKO-Pro K-1 Middleweight (-75 kg) World Champion
    - One successful title defense
- World Traditional Kickboxing Association
  - 2016 WTKA K-1 European -75 kg Champion
  - 2018 WTKA K-1 World -75 kg Champion

== Kickboxing record ==
Professional Kickboxing Record
26 Wins (14 (T)KO's), 2 Losses, 0 Draws
Date	Result	Opponent	Event	Location	Method	Round	Time
2025-06-14	Loss	(France) Enzo Kartoum	Revolt Championship Tournament, Semifinals	Turin, Italy	TKO (3 Knockdowns)	1	
2025-06-14	Win	(Italy) Gianluca Franzosi	Revolt Championship Tournament, Quarterfinals	Turin, Italy	Decision (Unanimous)	3	3:00
2025-04-05	Win	(Romania) Mădălin Crăciunică	Fight Clubbing 37	Romei, Italy	KO (Low kick)	2	
Defends WAKO Pro K-1 World Middleweight (-75 kg) Title.
2022-12-17	Win	(Spain) Aixay Hernandez	Fight Clubbing 30	Chieti, Italy	Decision (Unanimous)	3	3:00
2022-04-14	Win	(Georgia (country)) Levan Guruli	Fight Clubbing 29	Pescara, Italy	TKO (Left hook to the body)	3	
Defends WAKO Pro K-1 World Middleweight (-75 kg) Title and wins the vacant Fight Clubbing Middleweight Title.
2021-12-18	Win	(Greece) Giannis Boukis	Fight Clubbing 28	Chieti, Italy	KO (Left hook)	2	1:48
2021-06-11	Win	(Estonia) Maikel Astur	Wako-Pro K1 World Title -75 kg	Rome, Italy	TKO (Low kick)	4	
Wins the vacant WAKO Pro K-1 World Middleweight (-75 kg) Title.
2019-10-26	Loss	(Curaçao) Endy Semeleer	Enfusion 89	Wuppertal, Germany	TKO (Punches)	3	
2019-05-25	Win	(Portugal) Diogo Calado	Oktagon	Monza, Italy	KO (Left hook)	1	2:33
2019-03-23	Win	(Netherlands) Regilio van den Ent	Enfusion 80	Rome, Italy	Ext.R Decision	4	3:00
2018-12-1	Win	(Czech Republic) Matous Kohout	Enfusion 75	Trinec, Czech Republic	KO (Right hook)	2	
2018-07-14	Win	(Albania) Fatmir Gordi	Bellator Rome 2018	Rome, Italy	Decision (unanimous)	3	3:00
2018-04-24	Win	(Armenia) Armen Hovhannisyan	Fight Club Rome 2018	Rome, Italy	Decision (unanimous)	5	3:00
2017-12-03	Win	(Italy) Federico Spano	Invictus Arena	Rome, Italy	TKO (Low kick)	3	
2017-03-26	Win	(Netherlands) Angaar Afghaan Nasr	Fight Club Rome 2017	Rome, Italy	Decision (unanimous)	3	3:00
2017-02-26	Win	(Romania) Marvin Belecciu	Fighting Day	Imola, Italy	TKO	3	
2017-01-14	Win	(Romania) Adrian Mitu	The Night Of Kick And Punch 6	Assago, Italy	Decision (unanimous)	3	3:00
2016-04-10	Win	(France) Mehdi Kada	Fight Club Rome 2016	Assago, Italy	TKO (Punches)	1	
2016-03-06	Win	(Italy) Michele Leonzio	Fighting Day	Imola, Italy	Decision (unanimous)	3	3:00
2015-10-11	Win	(Italy) Gabriele Galasso	Fight Live Episode 1 - Superkombat New Heroes, Final	Palestrina, Italy	Decision (unanimous)	3	3:00
2015-10-11	Win	(Italy) Francesco Palermo	Fight Live Episode 1 - Superkombat New Heroes, Semifinals	Palestrina, Italy	Decision (unanimous)	3	3:00
2015-04-12	Win	(Italy) Jaouad El Byari	Superkombat New Heroes - Roma Fight Club	Rome, Italy	KO (Right cross)	1	2:50
2014-11-16	Win	(Netherlands) Redouan Daoudi	Fighting Spirit Muay Thai 3	Rome, Italy	KO (Right overhand)	2	0:48
2014-10-19	Win	(Italy) Marco Della Gaggia	Invictus Arena 8	Rome, Italy	KO (Left hook)	2	0:25
2014-06-01	Win	(Italy) Francesco Palermo	FIKBMS Italian Elite Championship -75 kg Final	Rimini, Italy	TKO (Punches)	2	
Wins the FIKBMS Italy -75kg title.
2014-03-23	Win	(Italy) Simone Macchia	Fight4Life	Prato, Italy	TKO	2	
2014-03-02	Win	(Italy) Roberto Marinotti	Fighting Spirit Muay Thai 2	Rome, Italy	Decision	3	3:00
2013-11-23	Win	(Italy) Hamid El Jazouli	Fighting Spirit Muay Thai	Rome, Italy	KO (Low kick)	2	
Legend: Win Loss Draw/No contest Notes

Amateur Kickboxing Record
Date	Result	Opponent	Event	Location	Method	Round	Time
2021-05-16	Win	(Italy) Emanuele Lulaj	FederKombat Italian Championship, Final	Rome, Italy	Decision	2	2:00
Wins 2021 Campionati Assoluti KB Ring K-1 -81kg title.
2021-05-16	Win	(Italy) Luca Carnevali	FederKombat Italian Championship, Semifinals	Rome, Italy	Decision	2	2:00
2021-05-16	Win	(Italy) Giuseppe Caruso	FederKombat Italian Championship, Quarterfinals	Rome, Italy	Decision	2	2:00
2014-	Win	(Italy) Andre Fontana		Italy	KO	3	
Wins the FIKB Italy title.
2014-	Win	(Italy) Danilo Berni		Italy	KO	1	
Legend: Win Loss Draw/No contest Notes
