= Jay Overmeer =

Dutch kickboxer

- Born: Jay Joey Overmeer; December 1, 1996 (age 29); Amsterdam, Netherlands
- Height: 185 cm (6 ft 1 in)
- Weight: 77 kg (170 lb; 12.1 st)
- Style: Kickboxing
- Stance: Orthodox
- Fighting out of: Amsterdam, Netherlands
- Team: Team Nibte
- Trainer: Ricardo Nibte
- Years active: 2014 - present

Kickboxing record
- Total: 44
- Wins: 32
- By knockout: 16
- Losses: 12
- By knockout: 2

Jay Overmeer (born December 1, 1996) is a Dutch kickboxer, currently competing in the welterweight division of Glory. As of September 2026, he is ranked as the seventh best Welterweight Kickboxer in the world by Beyond Kickboxing.

== Kickboxing career ==
=== Early career ===
Overmeer faced future Glory middleweight champion Donovan Wisse at World Fighting League 5 : Champions vs. Champions on April 23, 2017. He lost the fight by unanimous decision.

Overmeer took part in the 2017 World Fighting League welterweight tournament, which was held on October 29, 2017. He captured the tournament title with unanimous decision victories over Abdelmouniem Mouyah in the semifinal and Darryl Sichtman in the final.

Overmeer participated in the 2019 King of Kings welterweight tournament. He was eliminated in the semifinals of the one-day tournament, as he lost to Ekrem Doruk by a narrow split decision, after an extra fourth round was contested. Overmeer faced the eventual tournament winner Chico Kwasi two years later, at a May 21, 2021, WFL event. He won the fight by unanimous decision, after knocking Kwasi down with a head kick.

Overmeer faced Haris Biber at the August 21, 2021, World Fighting League event. He won the fight by a third-round technical knockout, as the in-ring official waved the fight off, judging Biber to have sustained too much damage. It was later revealed by Biber that he had suffered a broken nose and jaw.

Overmeer was booked to face the two-weight Enfusion champion Endy Semeleer for the inaugural Enfusion World Welterweight (-77kg) Championship at Enfusion #104 on November 12, 2021. He lost the fight by unanimous decision.

=== Glory ===
Overmeer made his Glory debut against Jos van Belzen at Glory 80 on March 19, 2022. He won the fight by technical knockout, after thrice knocking van Belzen down in the second round.

Overmeer faced Rodrigo Mineiro in his next Glory appearance, at Glory Rivals 1 on June 11, 2022. He won the fight by a first-round knockout, stopping Mineiro with a well-placed knee strike.

Overmeer faced the former Enfusion 80 kg champion Robin Ciric at Glory Rivals 3 on November 5, 2022. He won the fight by unanimous decision.

Overmeer faced Jamie Bates at Glory 84 on March 11, 2023. He won the fight by a second-round technical knockout, after thrice knocking Bates down by the 2:42 minute mark of the round.

Overmeer challenged Endy Semeleer for the Glory Welterweight Championship at Glory: Collision 5 on June 17, 2023. He lost the fight by unanimous decision.

Overmeer faced Chico Kwasi at Glory: Collision 6 on November 4, 2023. He lost the fight by split decision.

Overmeer faced Teodor Hristov at Glory 92 on May 18, 2024. He lost the fight by unanimous decision.

Overmeer faced Ismail Ouzgni at Glory 94 on August 31, 2024. He won the fight by a second-round technical knockout.

Overmeer rematched Semeleer at Glory: Collision 5, on December 7, 2024. He lost the bout via unanimous decision.

Overmeer made his K-1 debut at K-1 World MAX 2026 in Utrecht - World Fighting League, on April 19, 2026. He won the bout via unanimous decision.

Overmeer challenged Christian Baya for the World Fighting League -75 kg title, at World Fighting League on June 27, 2026. He lost the bout via KO in the first round.

Overmeer returned to Glory against Don Sno at Glory 109, on September 5, 2026. He won the bout via unanimous decision.

== Championships and accomplishments ==
- World Fighting League
  - 2017 WFL Welterweight (-77 kg) Tournament Winner
  - 2019 WFL Welterweight (-77 kg) Championship

== Kickboxing record ==
Kickboxing record
32 wins (16 (T)KOs), 12 losses, 0 draw, 0 no contests
Date	Result	Opponent	Event	Location	Method	Round	Time
2026-12-12		(Croatia) Antonio Krajinović	Glory Collision 10 - Welterweight Grand Prix, Quarterfinals	Arnhem, Netherlands			
2026-09-05	Win	(Suriname) Don Sno	Glory 109	Rotterdam, Netherlands	Decision (unanimous)	3	3:00
2026-06-27	Loss	(Netherlands) Christian Baya	World Fighting League	Utrecht, Netherlands	KO (right hook)	1	2:00
For the World Fighting League -75kg title.
2026-04-19	Win	(Italy) Yassin Rezgui	K-1 World MAX 2026 in Utrecht - World Fighting League	Utrecht, Netherlands	Decision (unanimous)	3	3:00
2024-12-07	Loss	(Curaçao) Endy Semeleer	Glory Collision 7	Arnhem, Netherlands	Decision (unanimous)	3	3:00
2024-08-31	Win	(Morocco) Ismail Ouzgni	Glory 94	Antwerp, Belgium	TKO (retirement/injury)	2	1:18
2024-05-18	Loss	(Bulgaria) Teodor Hristov	Glory 92	Rotterdam, Netherlands	Decision (unanimous)	3	3:00
2023-11-04	Loss	(Netherlands) Chico Kwasi	Glory: Collision 6	Arnhem, Netherlands	Decision (split)	3	3:00
2023-06-17	Loss	(Curaçao) Endy Semeleer	Glory: Collision 5	Rotterdam, Netherlands	Decision (unanimous)	5	3:00
For the Glory Welterweight Championship.
2023-03-11	Win	(United Kingdom) Jamie Bates	Glory 84	Rotterdam, Netherlands	TKO (three knockdowns)	2	2:42
2022-11-05	Win	(Netherlands) Robin Ciric	Glory Rivals 3	Amsterdam, Netherlands	Decision (unanimous)	3	3:00
2022-06-11	Win	(Brazil) Rodrigo Mineiro	Glory Rivals 1	Alkmaar, Netherlands	KO (knee)	2	0:55
2022-03-19	Win	(Netherlands) Jos van Belzen	Glory 80	Hasselt, Belgium	TKO (3 knockdowns)	2	2:47
2021-11-12	Loss	(Curaçao) Endy Semeleer	Enfusion 104	Abu Dhabi, United Arab Emirates	Decision (unanimous)	5	3:00
For the inaugural Enfusion World Welterweight (-77kg) Championship.
2021-08-22	Win	(Bosnia and Herzegovina) Haris Biber	World Fight League	Netherlands	TKO (referee stoppage)	3	
2021-05-15	Win	(Netherlands) Chico Kwasi	World Fight League	Netherlands	Decision (unanimous)	3	3:00
2019-11-30	Loss	(Turkey) Ekrem Doruk	KOK World Series 2019 Germany, Welterweight Tournament Semifinals	Krefeld, Germany	Ext. R. decision (split)	4	3:00
2019-02-17	Win	(Netherlands) Darryl Sichtman	WFL Final 8	Alkmaar, Netherlands	Decision (unanimous)	3	3:00
Won the WFL Welterweight (-77 kg) title.
2018-07-07	Loss	(Netherlands) Mitch Kuijpers	WFL	Alkmaar, Netherlands	TKO (doctor stop/shoulder dislocation)	2	
2018-03-25	Win	(Netherlands) Fernando Groenhart	WFL Final 8	Alkmaar, Netherlands	Decision (unanimous)	3	3:00
2017-10-29	Win	(Netherlands) Darryl Sichtman	WFL Final 16, Welterweight Tournament Finals	Alkmaar, Netherlands	Decision (unanimous)	3	3:00
Won the WFL Welterweight (-77 kg) Tournament title.
2017-10-29	Win	(Netherlands) Abdelmouniem Mouyah	WFL Final 16, Welterweight Tournament Semifinals	Alkmaar, Netherlands	Decision (unanimous)	3	3:00
2017-04-23	Loss	(Suriname) Donovan Wisse	World Fighting League 5 : Champions vs. Champions	Netherlands	Decision (unanimous)	3	3:00
2017-03-19	Win	(Netherlands) Kenneth Susanna	Fight Time Haarlem	Haarlem, Netherlands	Decision (unanimous)	3	3:00
2016-10-16	Win	(Morocco) Amine Doudou	ACB KB 8: Only The Braves	Hoofddorp, Netherlands	Decision	3	3:00
2016-04-03	Loss	(Netherlands) Tom Duivenvoorden	World Fighting League	Hoofddorp, Netherlands	Decision	3	3:00
2016-03-05	Loss	(Netherlands) Marino Schouten	House of Pain 2016	Alkmaar, Netherlands	Decision (unanimous)	3	3:00
2015-11-14	Win	(Netherlands) Serginio Kruydenhof	Final RINGS League, Final	Aalsmeer, Netherlands	Decision	3	3:00
Wins the Final RINGS Welterweight Tournament.
2015-11-14	Win	(Netherlands) Mark Trijsburg	Final RINGS League, Semi Final	Aalsmeer, Netherlands	TKO (punches)	2	
2015-04-12	Win	(Netherlands) Onur Sahin	World Fighting League	Hoofddorp, Netherlands	Decision (unanimous)	3	3:00
2015-04-04	Win	(Netherlands) Haitem Touiri	RINGS	Badhoevedorp, Netherlands	TKO	1	
2014-09-27	Win	(Afghanistan) Rushad Moradi	SuperKombat World Grand Prix IV 2014	Alkmaar, Netherlands	Decision (unanimous)	3	3:00
2014-06-14	Loss	(Moldova) Eugenio Deozu	RINGS Amstelveen	Amstelveen, Netherlands	KO	1	
2014-03-15	Win	(Netherlands) Nicky Ritfeld	RINGS	Huizen, Netherlands	TKO	3	
Legend: Win Loss Draw/no contest Notes

== See also ==
- List of male kickboxers
