= Endy Semeleer =

Dutch kickboxer (born 1995)

- Born: Pedro Shurendy Semeleer; 18 November 1995 (age 30); Willemstad, Curaçao, Netherlands Antilles
- Other names: Bad News Endy
- Height: 1.79 m (5 ft 10 1/2 in)
- Weight: 77 kg (170 lb; 12.1 st)
- Division: Welterweight
- Reach: 190 cm (75 in)
- Style: Kickboxing
- Fighting out of: Emmeloord, Netherlands
- Team: ARJ Gym; Budo Centrum NOP; Budo Academy Physical Ermelo
- Trainer: Mike Polanen; Boy van Veen; Erik van der Wal
- Years active: 2011-present

Kickboxing record
- Total: 43
- Wins: 40
- By knockout: 18
- Losses: 3
- By knockout: 1

Mixed martial arts record
- Total: 2
- Wins: 2
- By knockout: 2
- Losses: 0

Endy Semeleer (born 18 November 1995) is a Curaçaoan-Dutch kickboxer and mixed martial artist. He is a former Glory welterweight champion and three-weight Enfusion champion, having held titles at -72.5 kg,-75 kg and -77 kg.

Semleer was ranked as the fifth best welterweight in the world by Combat Press as of September 2022, and the fourth best by Beyond Kickboxing as of October 2022. Semeleer has been continually ranked in the Combat Press top ten since January 2018. Semeleer holds notable wins over Jay Overmeer (2X), Murthel Groenhart, Alim Nabiev, Marouan Toutouh (2X), Superbon Banchamek, Diogo Calado, and Mohamed Khamal

== Kickboxing career ==
=== Early career ===
In 2016 Endy participated in an eight-man King of the Ring tournament. Following a flying knee win over Nicky Lopez and a TKO win over Marcel Verhaar, Semeleer faced Robert Siebenheller in the final match of the tournament. He won the fight by a first-round knockout.

=== Enfusion ===
==== Abu Dhabi Tournament ====
The following year, he was signed with Enfusion. He achieved a four fight winning streak with the organization, with decision wins over Bilal Loukili and Regilio van den Ent, as well as KO wins over Hamed Nabil and Jordan Watson. This earned him a spot in the Enfusion Eight Man Tournament. In the quarter-final bout he scored a third-round TKO win over Diogo Calado, and in the semi-finals a decision win over Mohamed Khamal. In the finals of the tournament, Endy faced the kickboxing and muay thai legend Superbon Banchamek. Semeleer won the fight by a unanimous decision, winning the tournament and €100 000 in prize money. Combat Press gave this fight their "Upset of the Year" award.

==== Enfusion 75kg Champion ====
Semeleer faced Enfusion Aziz Kallah for the vacant 75 kg World title at Enfusion 73 on 27 October 2018. He won the title by unanimous decision.

Two months later, Semeleer participated in the Enfusion -72.5 kg tournament, which was held at Enfusion Live 76 on 7 December 2018. Although he won the quarterfinal bout against Marouan Toutouh by unanimous decision, he forced to withdraw due to an injury he suffered during the bout.

Semeleer attempted to become a two weight world champion when he challenged the reigning 72.5 kg champion Tayfun Özcan at Enfusion Live 79 on 23 February 2019. Semeleer suffered the first loss of his professional career, dropping a decision to the Dutch-Turkish fighter.

Semeleer made his first -75 kg title defense against Marouan Toutouh at Enfusion 85 on 8 June 2019. He won the fight by unanimous decision.

Semeleer faced Davide Armanini in a non-title bout at Enfusion 89 on 26 October 2019. He won the fight by a third-round technical knockout.

==== Double champion ====
Semeleer once again attempted to capture the 72.5 kg World title at Enfusion 98 on 3 October 2019, as he was booked to face Nordin van Roosmalen. Endy scored an early knockdown in the first round, landing a knee to Nordin's head. He dominated the remaining four rounds as well, and won the fight by a unanimous decision.

Semeleer was booked to face the two-time Dutch kickboxing champion Kevin Hessling on 11 September 2021, at the Enfusion's Nijmegen event. He won the fight by a first-round knockout.

Semeleer was scheduled to face Jay Overmeer for the inaugural Enfusion World Welterweight (-77kg) Championship at Enfusion #104 on 12 November 2021. He won the fight by unanimous decision.

=== Glory ===
On 21 April 2022, it was announced that Semeleer had signed with Glory. Semeleer was expected to make his debut against Harut Grigorian at Glory Rivals 1 on 21 May 2022. The event was later postponed, as The Lotto Arena announced that their cooperation with the Antwerp Fight Organisation had been terminated due to various administrative reasons.

Semeleer was expected to face Robin Ciric in the main event of Glory Rivals 2 on 25 July 2022. Ciric withdrew from the fight in 29 August, after contracting COVID-19, and was replaced by Shkodran Veseli. Semeleer won the fight by third-round knockout.

==== Welterweight champion ====
Semeleer faced the second-ranked Glory welterweight contender Alim Nabiev for the vacant Glory Welterweight Championship at Glory 82 on 19 November 2022. He won the fight by split decision, with three judges scoring the bout 48–47 in his favor, while the remaining two judges scored it 49–46 and 48–47 for Nabiev.

Semeleer made his first welterweight title defense against Murthel Groenhart at Glory 85 on 29 April 2023. He retained the title by unanimous decision, after knocking Groenhart down several times, with all five judges awarding him a 50–42 scorecard.

Semeleer made his second title defense against the #1 ranked Glory welterweight contender Jay Overmeer at Glory: Collision 5 on 17 June 2023. He retained the title by unanimous decision.

Semeleer made his third Glory Welterweight Championship defense against Anwar Ouled-Chaib at Glory 90 on 23 December 2023. He won the fight by a first-round knockout.

==== Title loss ====
Semeleer made his fourth Glory Welterweight Championship defense against Chico Kwasi at Glory 91 on 27 April 2024. He lost the fight by a second-round technical knockout.

Semeleer faced the reigning Glory Lightweight champion Tyjani Beztati in a welterweight bout at Glory 93 on 20 July 2024. He lost the fight by unanimous decision.

== Mixed martial arts career ==
Semeleer announced a transition to MMA in June 2026, and signed with the Dutch promotion Levels Fight League.

== Championships and accomplishments ==
- Glory
  - 2022 Glory Welterweight (-77 kg) Champion
    - Three successful title defenses
  - 2025 Glory Welterweight 4-man Tournament Winner
- Enfusion
  - 2017 Enfusion Abu Dhabi: 8-Man Tournament Winner
  - 2018 Enfusion 75 kg World Champion
    - One successful title defense
  - 2020 Enfusion 72.5 kg World Champion
  - 2021 Enfusion 77 kg World Champion
- King of the Ring
  - 2016 King of the Ring 8-Man Tournament Winner

Awards

- Combat Press
  - 2017 Upset of the Year Award vs. Superbon Banchamek

== Mixed martial arts record ==
Professional record breakdown
2 matches	2 wins	0 losses
By knockout	2	0

Res.	Record	Opponent	Method	Event	Date	Round	Time	Location	Notes
Win	2–0	Henrique Melo	TKO (punches)	Levels Fight League 24	September 26, 2026	1	1:14	Den Bosch, Netherlands	Catchweight (159 lb) bout.
Win	1–0	Ronny Gomez	TKO (submission to punches)	Levels Fight League 23	July 5, 2026	1	2:52	Amsterdam, Netherlands	Catchweight (162 lb) bout.

== Kickboxing record ==
Kickboxing Record
40 Wins (18 (T)KO's), 3 Losses, 0 Draws
Date	Result	Opponent	Event	Location	Method	Round	Time
2025-12-13	Win	(Bulgaria) Teodor Hristov	Glory Collision 8 - Welterweight Tournament, Final	Arnhem, Netherlands	Decision (Unanimous)	3	3:00
Wins the 2025 Glory Welterweight Tournament.
2025-12-13	Win	(Suriname) Don Sno	Glory Collision 8 - Welterweight Tournament, Semifinals	Arnhem, Netherlands	Decision (Unanimous)	3	3:00
2025-11-01	Win	(Cape Verde) Marvin Monteiro	Honor Fight League 6	Willemstad, Curaçao	Decision (Unanimous)	3	3:00
2024-12-07	Win	(Netherlands) Jay Overmeer	Glory Collision 7	Arnhem, Netherlands	Decision (Unanimous)	3	3:00
2024-07-20	Loss	(Morocco) Tyjani Beztati	Glory 93	Rotterdam, Netherlands	Decision (Unanimous)	3	3:00
2024-04-27	Loss	(Netherlands) Chico Kwasi	Glory 91	Paris, France	TKO (3 Knockdowns)	2	2:07
Loses the Glory Welterweight Championship.
2023-12-23	Win	(Morocco) Anwar Ouled-Chaib	Glory 90	Rotterdam, Netherlands	TKO (3 Knockdowns)	1	1:53
Defends the Glory Welterweight Championship.
2023-06-17	Win	(Netherlands) Jay Overmeer	Glory: Collision 5	Rotterdam, Netherlands	Decision (Unanimous)	5	3:00
Defends the Glory Welterweight Championship.
2023-04-29	Win	(Netherlands) Murthel Groenhart	Glory 85	Rotterdam, Netherlands	Decision (Unanimous)	5	3:00
Defends the Glory Welterweight Championship.
2022-11-19	Win	(Azerbaijan) Alim Nabiev	Glory 82	Bonn, Germany	Decision (Split)	5	3:00
Wins the vacant Glory Welterweight Championship.
2022-09-17	Win	(Albania) Shkodran Veseli	Glory Rivals 2	Alkmaar, Netherlands	KO (Right hook)	3	1:05
2021-11-12	Win	(Netherlands) Jay Overmeer	Enfusion 104	Abu Dhabi, United Arab Emirates	Decision (Unanimous)	5	3:00
Wins the inaugural Enfusion World Welterweight (-77kg) Championship.
2021-09-05	Win	(Netherlands) Kevin Hessling	Enfusion 102	Alkmaar, Netherlands	KO (Left hook)	1	1:05
2020-10-03	Win	(Netherlands) Nordin van Roosmalen	Enfusion 98	Alkmaar, Netherlands	Decision (Unanimous)	5	3:00
Wins the vacant Enfusion Live 72.5kg World Title.
2019-10-26	Win	(Italy) Davide Armanini	Enfusion 89	Wuppertal, Germany	TKO (Punches)	3	
2019-06-08	Win	(Morocco) Marouan Toutouh	Enfusion 85	Groningen, Netherlands	Decision (Unanimous)	5	3:00
Defends the Enfusion Live 75kg World Title.
2019-02-23	Loss	(Turkey) Tayfun Özcan	Enfusion Live 79	Eindhoven, Netherlands	Decision	5	3:00
For the Enfusion Live 72.5kg World Title.
2018-12-07	Win	(Morocco) Marouan Toutouh	Enfusion Live 76 - 72.5kg 8 Man Tournament, Quarter-finals	Abu Dhabi, United Arab Emirates	Decision (Unanimous)	3	3:00
Despite winning fight, has to withdraw from tournament due to injury.
2018-10-27	Win	(Morocco) Aziz Kallah	Enfusion 73	Oberhausen, Germany	Decision (Unanimous)	5	3:00
Wins the Enfusion Live 75kg World Title.
2018-06-23	Win	(Netherlands) Paul Jensen	Enfusion 69	Netherlands	TKO (Doctor stoppage/Cut)	2	0:52
2018-05-12	Win	(Morocco) Nordin Ben-Moh	Enfusion 67	The Hague, Netherlands	Decision (Unanimous)	3	3:00
2018-03-09	Win	(Netherlands) Redouan Laarkoubi	Enfusion Live	Abu Dhabi, UAE	Decision (Unanimous)	3	3:00
2017-12-08	Win	(Thailand) Superbon Banchamek	Enfusion Live 59: Final	Abu Dhabi, UAE	Decision (Unanimous)	3	3:00
Wins the Enfusion Live 2017 8-Man Tournament.
2017-12-08	Win	(Morocco) Mohamed Khamal	Enfusion Live 59: Semi-finals	Abu Dhabi, UAE	Decision (Unanimous)	3	3:00
2017-12-08	Win	(Portugal) Diogo Calado	Enfusion Live 59: Quarter-finals	Abu Dhabi, UAE	TKO (Right cross)	3	3:00
2017-11-11	Win	(England) Jordan Watson	Enfusion Live 55 Final 16	Amsterdam, Netherlands	TKO (Jumping knee)	4	
2017-09-16	Win	(Netherlands) Regilio van den Ent	Enfusion Live 52	Zwolle, Netherlands	Decision (Unanimous)	3	
2017-05-06	Win	(Suriname) Martin Hiffens	Battle Events	Amersfoort, Netherlands	TKO (Punches + knee)	3	
2017-03-24	Win	(United Arab Emirates) Hamed Nabil	Enfusion Live 48	Abu Dhabi, UAE	TKO	1	
2017-02-18	Win	(Morocco) Bilal Loukili	Enfusion Live 46	Eindhoven, Netherlands	Decision (Unanimous)	3	
2016-10-30	Win	(Netherlands) Robert Siebenheller	King of the Ring IV: Final	Arnhem, Netherlands	KO	1	
Wins the King of the Ring 2016 8-Man Tournament.
2016-10-30	Win	(Netherlands) Marcel Verhaar	King of the Ring IV: Semi-finals	Arnhem, Netherlands	TKO (retirement)	1	
2016-10-30	Win	(Netherlands) Nicky Lopez	King of the Ring IV: Quarter-finals	Arnhem, Netherlands	KO (Knee to the head)	1	
2016-09-24	Win	(Netherlands) William Diender	Battle Events	Arnhem, Netherlands	Decision (Unanimous)	4	
2016-04-11	Win	(Netherlands) Leroy Kaestner	Battle Events	Arnhem, Netherlands	Ext. R. Decision (Unanimous)	4	
2016-02-20	Win	(Netherlands) Joey Huis	Fighting Network Rings	Mijdrecht, Netherlands	TKO (Doctor stoppage)	5	
Legend: Win Loss Draw/No contest Notes

== See also ==
- List of male kickboxers
