= Teodor Hristov =

Bulgarian kickboxer

- Born: November 8, 2000 (age 25); Varna, Bulgaria
- Native name: Теодор Христов
- Height: 186 cm (6 ft 1 in)
- Weight: 77 kg (170 lb; 12.1 st)
- Style: Kickboxing
- Stance: Orthodox
- Fighting out of: Varna, Bulgaria
- Team: WARRIOR - Varna
- Trainer: Delyan Slavov
- Years active: 2017–present

Kickboxing record
- Total: 27
- Wins: 20
- By knockout: 8
- Losses: 7
- By knockout: 0

Teodor Hristov (born November 8, 2000) is a Bulgarian kickboxer, currently competing in the welterweight division of Glory. As of September 2026, he is ranked as the best welterweight in the world by Beyond Kickboxing.

== Professional kickboxing career ==
=== Early career ===
Hristov started training in kickboxing at the age of 9. At the age of 14 he joined the national and started to compete in international amateur competition. He made his professional debut at the age of 16 on the Max Fight promotion where he defeated Kostadin Mihailov by unanimous decision.

Hristov faced Dobroslav Radaev at the inaugural Senshi event on February 23, 2019. He lost the fight by split decision. The two of them faced each other in a rematch at Pro Fight 16 on October 6, 2019. Hristov lost the fight by unanimous decision.

Hristov made his Enfusion debut against Dragan Cimeša at Enfusion Talents 72 on June 28, 2019. He lost the fight by unanimous decision.

Hristov faced Lucas Trifonos for the WKF Intercontinental Welterweight (−77 kg) title at Castle Gladiators on July 27, 2019. He captured the title by unanimous decision and was furthermore given the "Fighter of the Evening" award as well.

Hristov faced Hamza Ait Bachir at Pro Gala Fight Night on February 22, 2020. He won the fight by a first-round knockout.

Hristov was expected to face Vasilij Kirica at Max Fight 45 on July 1, 2021, as a short notice replacement for Branko Babachev, who withdrew with an injury suffered in training. Kirica was himself replaced by Alexander Gushuvaty, a few days before the fight was supposed to take place. Hristov won the fight by unanimous decision.

Hristov faced Valentin Paskali at Max Fight 51 on July 8, 2022. He won the fight by a first-round knockout.

Hristov faced Mehdi Ait El Hadj at Senshi 15 on February 18, 2023. He won the fight by unanimous decision. Hristov was next expected to face Eddy Ruiz at Senshi 16 on May 13, 2023, but was forced to withdraw from the fight. The bout was rescheduled for Senshi 17 on July 8, 2023. He won the fight by unanimous decision.

Hristov was expected to face Bosnea Neculai at Max Fight 54 on June 2, 2023. Neculai withdrew from the bout the day before it was supposed to take place and was replaced by Alexander Bortos. Hristov won the fight by a first-round knockout.

=== GLORY ===
On August 24, 2023, it was announced that Hristov had signed with Glory. Hristov made his Glory debut against Eduard Gafencu at Glory 89 on October 7, 2023. He won the fight by unanimous decision.

Hristov faced the 2012 K-1 World MAX World Championship Tournament champion Murthel Groenhart at Glory 90 on December 23, 2023. He won the fight by unanimous decision.

Hristov faced the one-time Glory Welterweight Championship challenger Jay Overmeer at Glory 92 on May 18, 2024. He won the fight by unanimous decision.

Hristov faced Robin Ciric at Glory 96 on October 12, 2024. He won the fight by unanimous decision, after an extra fourth round was contested.

Hristov challenged the Glory Welterweight champion Chico Kwasi at Glory 98 on February 22, 2025. He lost the fight by unanimous decision.

Hristov faced Kwasi in a rematch at Glory Collision 8, in the Semifinals of the Glory Welterweight Tournament, on December 13, 2025. He won the bout via unanimous decision, using his movement to outmaneuver the champion and force him to smother his own work. Hristov later faced former Glory Welterweight Champion Endy Semeleer in the Finals of the Tournament. He lost the bout via unanimous decision, with Semeleer taking advantage of a seemingly injured leg on Hristov to outwork him throughout the bout.

Hristov next faced Sabri Ben Henia at Max Fight 65, on May 29, 2026. He won the bout via TKO in the third round.

Hristov again challenged for the Glory Welterweight Championship against Chico Kwasi at Glory 109, on September 5, 2026. In what was ultimately a rather disappointing affair, Hristov lost the trilogy bout via unanimous decision, being unable to meaningfully crack Kwasi's defense during the bout.

== Championships and accomplishments ==
Professional

- Castle Gladiators
  - 2018 Castle Gladiators Welterweight (−75 kg) Championship
- World Kickboxing Federation
  - 2019 WKF Intercontinental Welterweight (−77 kg) Championship
- Max Fight Championship
  - 2022 Max Fight Welterweight (−78 kg) Championship

Amateur

- World Association of Kickboxing Organizations
  - 2016 WAKO World Junior Championship −60 kg Low-kick (silver)
  - 2017 WAKO European Junior Championship −67 kg K-1 (bronze)
  - 2018 WAKO World Junior Championship −71 kg K-1 (silver)
  - 2019 WAKO European Junior Championship −75 kg K-1 (bronze)
  - 2019 WAKO World Championship −75 kg K-1 (bronze)
  - 2022 WAKO World Championship −81 kg K-1 (bronze)

== Kickboxing record ==
Professional kickboxing record
20 wins (8 (T)KOs), 7 losses, 0 draws
Date	Result	Opponent	Event	Location	Method	Round	Time
2026-12-12		(Morocco) Anwar Ouled-Chaib	Glory Collision 10 - Welterweight Grand Prix, Quarterfinals	Arnhem, Netherlands			
2026-09-05	Loss	(Netherlands) Chico Kwasi	Glory 109	Rotterdam, Netherlands	Decision (unanimous)	5	3:00
For the Glory Welterweight Championship.
2026-05-29	Win	(Belgium) Sabri Ben Henia	Max Fight 65	Plovdiv, Bulgaria	TKO	3	
2025-12-13	Loss	(Curaçao) Endy Semeleer	Glory Collision 8 - Welterweight Tournament, Final	Arnhem, Netherlands	Decision (unanimous)	3	3:00
2025-12-13	Win	(Netherlands) Chico Kwasi	Glory Collision 8 - Welterweight Tournament, Semifinals	Arnhem, Netherlands	Decision (unanimous)	3	3:00
2025-02-22	Loss	(Netherlands) Chico Kwasi	Glory 98	Rotterdam, Netherlands	Decision (unanimous)	5	3:00
For the Glory Welterweight Championship.
2024-10-12	Win	(Netherlands) Robin Ciric	Glory 96	Rotterdam, Netherlands	Ext.R decision (unanimous)	4	3:00
2024-05-18	Win	(Netherlands) Jay Overmeer	Glory 92	Rotterdam, Netherlands	Decision (unanimous)	3	3:00
2023-12-23	Win	(Suriname) Murthel Groenhart	Glory 90	Rotterdam, Netherlands	Decision (unanimous)	3	3:00
2023-10-07	Win	(Romania) Eduard Gafencu	Glory 89	Burgas, Bulgaria	Decision (unanimous)	3	3:00
2023-07-08	Win	(Spain) Eddy Ruiz	Senshi 17	Varna, Bulgaria	Decision (unanimous)	3	3:00
2023-06-02	Win	(France) Alexander Bortos	Max Fight 54	Plovdiv, Bulgaria	KO (knee)	1	2:54
2023-02-18	Win	(Morocco) Mehdi Ait El Hadj	Senshi 15	Varna, Bulgaria	Decision (unanimous)	3	3:00
2022-12-03	Win	(Romania) Andrei Ostrovanu	Mix Fight Championship	Frankfurt, Germany	Decision (split)	3	3:00
Wins the vacant Mix Fight Welterweight (−78 kg) title.
2022-07-08	Win	(Moldova) Valentin Pascali	Max Fight 51	Sunny Beach, Bulgaria	KO (knee to the body)	1	1:52
2022-06-25	Win	(Netherlands) Mike Frenken	Volkmarsener Fight Night 7	Volkmarsen, Germany	Decision (unanimous)	3	3:00
2021-10-23	Win	(Germany) Bedirhan Kabak	Enfusion Rookies II	Wuppertal, Germany	Decision (unanimous)	3	3:00
2021-08-02	Win	(Romania) Alin Cîmpan	Max Fight 46	Saint Vlas, Bulgaria	TKO (retirement)	2	3:00
2021-07-01	Win	(Ukraine) Alexander Gushuvaty	Max Fight 45	Nesebar, Bulgaria	Decision (unanimous)	3	3:00
2020-02-22	Win	(Morocco) Hamza Ait Bachir	Pro Gala Fight Night	Germany	KO	1	
2019-12-01	Win	(Serbia) Miloš Janković	Pro Fight 17	Dupnitsa, Bulgaria	Decision (unanimous)	3	3:00
2019-10-06	Loss	(Bulgaria) Dobroslav Radaev	Pro Fight 16	Burgas, Bulgaria	Decision (unanimous)	3	3:00
2019-07-27	Win	(Cyprus) Lucas Trifonos	Castle Gladiators	Paphos, Cyprus	Decision (unanimous)	3	3:00
Wins the WKF Intercontinental Welterweight (−77 kg) title.
2019-06-28	Loss	(Serbia) Dragan Cimeša	Enfusion Talents 72	Belgrade, Serbia	Decision (unanimous)	3	3:00
2019-02-23	Loss	(Bulgaria) Dobroslav Radaev	Senshi 1	Varna, Bulgaria	Decision (split)	3	3:00
2018-08-04	Win	(England) Danny Parker	Castle Gladiators	Paphos, Cyprus	Decision	3	3:00
Wins the Castle Gladiators Welterweight (−75 kg) title.
2017-10-13	Loss	(Bulgaria) Ali Yuzeir	B1B Fight Night	Varna, Bulgaria	Decision (unanimous)	3	3:00
2017-08-02	Win	(Bulgaria) Kostadin Mihailov	Max Fight 40	Saint Vlas, Bulgaria	Decision (unanimous)	3	3:00
Legend: Win Loss Draw/no contest Notes

Amateur kickboxing record
Date	Result	Opponent	Event	Location	Method	Round	Time
2022-11-13	Loss	(Turkey) Isa Gocmen	2022 WAKO World Championship, Tournament Semi-final	Antalya, Turkey	Decision (unanimous)	3	3:00
Wins the 2022 WAKO World Championship −81 kg K-1 Bronze Medal.
2022-11-12	Win	(Estonia) Maikel Astur	2022 WAKO World Championship, Tournament Quarterfinal	Antalya, Turkey	Decision (unanimous)	3	3:00
2022-11-11	Win	(Montenegro) Lazar Klikovač	2022 WAKO World Championship, Tournament First Round	Antalya, Turkey	Decision (unanimous)	3	3:00
2019-10-27	Loss	(Russia) Vlad Tuinov	2019 WAKO World Championship, Tournament Semi-final	Sarajevo, Bosnia and Herzegovina	Decision (unanimous)	3	2:00
Wins the 2019 WAKO World Championship −75 kg K-1 Bronze Medal.
2019-10-25	Win	(Lithuania) Raimondas Avlasevicius	2019 WAKO World Championship, Tournament Quarterfinal	Sarajevo, Bosnia and Herzegovina	Decision (unanimous)	3	2:00
2019-10-23	Win	(Australia) Cameron Bulley	2019 WAKO World Championship, Tournament Second Round	Sarajevo, Bosnia and Herzegovina	Decision (unanimous)	3	2:00
2019-08-29	Loss	(Estonia) Andres Oitsar	2019 WAKO European Junior Championship, Tournament Semi-final	Budapest, Hungary	Decision (unanimous)	3	2:00
Wins the 2019 WAKO European Junior Championship −75 kg K-1 Bronze Medal.
2019-08-27	Win	(Israel) Mohammad Zubidat	2019 WAKO European Junior Championship, Tournament Quarterfinal	Budapest, Hungary	Decision (unanimous)	3	2:00
2018-09-23	Loss	(Ukraine) Sviatoslav Hasiuk	2018 WAKO World Junior Championship, Tournament Final	Lido di Jesolo, Italy	Decision (unanimous)	3	3:00
Wins the 2018 WAKO World Junior Championship −71 kg K-1 Silver Medal.
2018-09-21	Win	(Hungary) Laska Bence	2018 WAKO World Junior Championship, Tournament Semi-final	Lido di Jesolo, Italy	Decision (unanimous)	3	2:00
2018-09-19	Win	(Kazakhstan) Mauletbay Zakharchenov	2018 WAKO World Junior Championship, Tournament Quarterfinal	Lido di Jesolo, Italy	Decision (unanimous)	3	2:00
2018-09-17	Win	(Croatia) Marino Horvat	2018 WAKO World Junior Championship, Tournament First Round	Lido di Jesolo, Italy	Decision (unanimous)	3	2:00
2017-09-	Loss	(Estonia) Danil Gaiduk	2017 WAKO European Junior Championship, Tournament Semi-final	Skopje, Macedonia	Decision (split)	3	2:00
Wins the 2017 WAKO European Junior Championship −67 kg K-1 Bronze Medal.
2016-09-	Loss	(Russia) Said Asatov	2016 WAKO World Junior Championship, Tournament Final	Dublin, Ireland	Decision (split)	3	2:00
Wins the 2016 WAKO World Junior Championship −60 kg Low-kick Silver Medal.
Legend: Win Loss Draw/no contest Notes

== See also ==
- List of male kickboxers
