= Chahid Hammouti =

Dutch-Moroccan kickboxer

- Born: Chahid Hammouti; August 3, 2004 (age 22)
- Nationality: Dutch; Moroccan
- Height: 1.90 m (6 ft 3 in)
- Weight: 80 kg (180 lb; 13 st)
- Style: Kickboxing
- Stance: Orthodox
- Fighting out of: Huizen, Netherlands
- Team: Fight Club Huizen
- Trainer: Mustapha Jaffaoui
- Years active: 2024 - present

Kickboxing record
- Total: 11
- Wins: 11
- By knockout: 5
- Losses: 0
- By knockout: 0
- Draws: 0

Chahid Hammouti (born August 3, 2004) is a Dutch-Moroccan kickboxer.

As of November 2026, he is ranked as the ninth best middleweight in the world by Beyond Kickboxing.

== Professional kickboxing career ==
Hammouti faced Alexandros Chrysochoidis at 8TKO #21 on November 1, 2025. He won the fight by a third-round knockout.

Hammouti faced Soufyan El Atiaoui at 8TKO #24 on January 31, 2026. He won the fight by a second-round knockout, after flooring El Atiaoui with a knee to the body.

Hammouti faced Germain Kpoghomou at 8TKO #26 on April 4, 2026. He won the fight by unanimous decision.

Hammouti faced Robin Ciric at 8TKO #28 on May 9, 2025. He won the fight by unanimous decision.

== Championships and accomplishments ==
- No Limit fight events
  - 2025 No Limit Infinity European 83 kg Champion

== Fight record ==
Professional kickboxing record
11 wins (5 (T)KOs), 0 losses, 0 draws, 0 no contests
Date	Result	Opponent	Event	Location	Method	Round	Time
2026-11-28		(Morocco) Anwar Dira	Glory Rivals 6	Den Bosch, Netherlands			
2026-10-10	Win	(Italy) Angelo Mirno	Sportmani Events – ‘Don’t Call It A Comeback II’	Almere, Netherlands	Decision (unanimous)	3	3:00
2026-05-09	Win	(Netherlands) Robin Ciric	8TKO #28	Heerenveen, Netherlands	Decision (unanimous)	3	3:00
2026-04-04	Win	(Guinea) Germain Kpoghomou	8TKO #26	Dordrecht, Netherlands	Decision (unanimous)	3	3:00
2026-01-31	Win	(Morocco) Soufyan El Atiaoui	8TKO #24	Doetinchem, Netherlands	KO (knee to the body)	2	1:52
2025-12-21	Win	(Spain) Samuel Delgado	Real Fighters – A Night 2 Remember	Hilversum, Netherlands	KO (right hook)	1	
2025-11-01	Win	(Greece) Alexandros Chrysochoidis	8TKO #21	Dordrecht, Netherlands	KO (left hook to the body)	3	1:04
2025-06-21	Win	(Spain) Florin Mihaita	No Limit Fightevents – Infinity #3	Amersfoort, Netherlands	KO (knee)	3	
Wins the Infinity European 83kg title.
2025-03-15	Win	(Argentina) Camilo Castagno	8TKO #15	The Hague, Netherlands	Decision (unanimous)	3	3:00
2025-02-23	Win	(Belgium) Mbamba Cauwenbergh	No Limit Fightevents – Infinity #2	Amersfoort, Netherlands	TKO (3 knockdowns)	2	
2024-12-22	Win	(Belgium) Isai Meekers	Real Fighters – A Night 2 Remember	Hilversum, Netherlands	Decision (unanimous)	3	3:00
2024-11-02	Win	(Morocco) Aimane Latifi	Enfusion #142	Dordrecht, Netherlands	Decision (split)	3	3:00
A-class debut.
2024-05-26	Win	(Morocco) Yassine Ettaki	Real Fighters - A Night 2 Remember	Hilversum, Netherlands	TKO	3	
2024-03-02	Win	(Morocco) Mohammed Akka	Ring Fight Promotions	Nijmegen, Netherlands	TKO	2	
Legend: Win Loss Draw/no contest Notes

== See also ==
- List of male kickboxers
