= Romei =

Romei may refer to:

- Angela Romei (born 1997), Italian curler
- Carlo Romei (born 1999), Italian football player
- Carlo Romei (politician) (1924–1986), Italian politician
- Roberto Romei (1926–2013), Italian politician
- Roberto Romei (footballer) (born 1957), Italian footballer

== See also ==
- Romea (disambiguation)
- Romeis
- Romeo (disambiguation)
