= Romeis =

Romeis is a surname. Notable people with the surname include:

- Jacob Romeis (1835–1904), American politician
- Leonhard Romeis (1854–1904), German architect

== See also ==
- Romei
