= Figuereido Landman =

Dutch Kickboxer

- Born: 2004/2005 (age 21–22); Veenendaal, Netherlands
- Height: 177 cm (5 ft 10 in)
- Weight: 77 kg (170 lb; 12 st 2 lb)
- Style: Kickboxing
- Stance: Orthodox
- Fighting out of: Breda, Netherlands
- Team: Hemmers Gym (2024 - present); Team Verhaar (2017 - 2024)

Kickboxing record
- Total: 18
- Wins: 15
- By knockout: 8
- Losses: 3
- By knockout: 0
- Draws: 0

Other information
- Boxing record from BoxRec

Figuereido "Figi" Landman (born 2004) is a Dutch kickboxer currently fighting for GLORY.

As of September 2026, he is ranked as the fourth best Welterweight Kickboxer in the world by Beyond Kickboxing.

== Biography and career ==
=== Early years ===
In 2017, Landman was fighting in front of the gym of Marcel Verhaar, who broke up the fight and invited him into the gym to calm down. Landman took part in training with the gym, and six months later had his first match.

=== Glory ===
in 2023, Landman was selected to take part in reality show House of Glory, on the team of Rico Verhoeven. Landman fought Andy Ristie in the Quarterfinals and won via decision. He lost in the semi final to Robin Ciric and was eliminated from the House of Glory Tournament.

Landman fought Petros Freitas at Glory: Collision 6 and won via split decision.

Landman fought Don Sno at Glory 92 and lost via unanimous decision.

His next fight was outside of Glory in the US, he fought Christian West at Southeast Striking, and won in the first round via TKO after scoring 3 knockdowns.

He next fought Bryan Burgos at RFC K-Series Kickboxing and defeated him by KO in the 5th round, winning the vacant RFC Promotions Welterweight Championship.

On June 14, 2025, Landman travelled to France to face Ilyass Chakir at La Nuit de L'Impact IX, for the Nuit de L'Impact K-1 -79 kg title. He won the fight via decision after scoring a first round knockdown.

On June 13, 2026, Landman faced Mehdi Ait El Hadj at Glory Collision 9. He won the fight by unanimous decision.

On September 5, 2026, Landman faced Mohammed Boutasaa at Glory 109. In the lead up to the fight there was a lot of trash talk between the fighters. Landman started off aggressively, pushing inside putting pressure on Boutassa, eventually they ended up making contact and both lost footing with Boutassa falling on top of Landman. Landman got injured in the fall, he held on in the first round but eventually got knocked down in the 2nd eventually he lost the bout via unanimous decision.

== Championship and accomplishments ==
=== Professional ===
- Revolution Fighters League
  - 2026 RFL K-1 -79 kg Champion

=== Amateur ===
- International Federation of Muaythai Associations
  - 2021 IFMA World Championships Youth (U-17) -75 kg (silver)

== Fight record ==
Professional Muay Thai and kickboxing record
15 Wins (8 (T)KO's), 3 Losses, 0 Draw
Date	Result	Opponent	Event	Location	Method	Round	Time
2026-09-05	Loss	(Morocco) Mohammed Boutasaa	Glory 109	Rotterdam, Netherlands	Decision (Unanimous)	3	3:00
2026-06-13	Win	(Morocco) Mehdi Ait El Hadj	Glory Collision 9	Rotterdam, Netherlands	Decision (Unanimous)	3	3:00
2026-02-21	Win	(Mexico) Roman Cordova	RFL 30	Monterrey, Mexico	KO (Punches)	1	
Wins the RFL K-1 -79kg title.
2025-12-13	Win	(Morocco) Ismail Ouzgni	Glory Collision 8	Arnhem, Netherlands	KO (Punches)	1	0:58
2025-06-14	Win	(Morocco) Ilyass Chakir	La Nuit de L'Impact IX	Saintes, France	Decision (Unanimous)	3	3:00
Wins the Nuit de L'Impact K-1 -79kg title.
2025-03-17	Win	(Thailand) Petchprasat	SKS Empire, Rajadamnern Stadium	Bangkok, Thailand	TKO (3 Knockdowns)	1	
2025-01-10	Win	(United States) Bryan Burgos	RFC K-Series Kickboxing	New York, US	KO (Left high kick)	5	0:25
Wins the vacant RFC Kickboxing Welterweight title.
2024-11-16	Win	(United States) Christian West	Southeast Striking	Greenville, South Carolina, US	KO (Punches)	1	
Wins the Southeast Striking Light Heavyweight (173 lbs) title.
2024-10-05	Win	(Turkey) Recep Dogan	Mega Fight Arena Series 2	Istanbul, Turkey	Decision (Unanimous)	3	3:00
2024-06-15	Win	(Netherlands) Deler Rasho	New Legends Fighting Network	Woerden, Netherlands	Decision	3	3:00
2024-05-18	Loss	(Suriname) Don Sno	Glory 92	Rotterdam, Netherlands	Decision (Unanimous)	3	3:00
2023-11-04	Win	(Brazil) Petros Freitas	Glory: Collision 6	Arnhem, Netherlands	Decision (Split)	3	3:00
2023-08-	Loss	(Netherlands) Robin Ciric	House of Glory, Tournament Semifinals	Netherlands	Decision (Unanimous)	3	3:00
2023-07-	Win	(Suriname) Andy Ristie	House of Glory, Tournament Quarterfinals	Netherlands	Decision (Unanimous)	3	3:00
2023-05-27	Win	(Morocco) Nabil Agharben	Fightersheart	Veenendaal, Netherlands	KO (Left high kick)	1	
2023-05-13	Win	(Turkey) Hakan Aksoy	Enfusion 122	Wuppertal, Germany	KO (Left hook)	1	0:20
2022-09-25	Draw	(Netherlands) Floris Hoek	Lollar Fight Night	Lollar, Germany	Decision	3	3:00
2022-06-05	Win	(Germany) Can Hircin	IFP - ECE #8	Darmstadt, Germany	KO (Spinning back fist)	1	1:45
B-class debut.
2022-03-26	Win	(Germany) Leon Pjatkow	Big Game	Bochum, Germany	Decision (Unanimous)	3	2:00
Legend: Win Loss Draw/No contest Notes

Amateur Muay Thai and Kickboxing Record
Date	Result	Opponent	Event	Location	Method	Round	Time
2021-12-10	Loss	(Russia) Shamil Shakhov	IFMA World Championships 2021	Bangkok, Thailand	Decision (30:27)	3	3:00
Wins 2021 IFMA World Championships Youth (U-17) -75kg Silver Medal.
Legend: Win Loss Draw/No contest Notes
