= 2023 in Glory =

Kickboxing events

Information
- First date: January 28
- Last date: December 23

Events
- Total events: 11

Fights
- Total fights: 96
- Title fights: 15

The year 2023 is the 12th year in the history of Glory, an international kickboxing promotion.

The events are broadcast on various channels such as Videoland, Viaplay and Go3. Events are also streamed pay-per-view on the Glory Fights platform and on Antena Play.

== Glory 2023 Awards ==
The following fighters won the GLORY Kickboxing year-end awards for 2023:

- Glory Fighter of the Year 2023: Donovan Wisse
- Glory Fight of the Year 2023: Ahmad Chikh Mousa vs. Berjan Peposhi (Glory 83)
- Glory Knockout of the Year 2023: Nordine Mahieddine vs. Abdarhmane Coulibaly (Glory 88)
- Glory Breakout Fighter of the Year 2023: Bahram Rajabzadeh
- Glory Newcomer of the Year 2023: Ștefan Lătescu

== List of events ==
#	Event title	Date	Arena	Location
1	Glory Rivals 5	January 28, 2023	Zamna Tulum	Tulum, Mexico
2	Glory 83	February 11, 2023	Grugahalle	Essen, Germany
3	Glory 84	March 11, 2023	Topsportcentrum	Rotterdam, The Netherlands
4	Glory 85	April 29, 2023	Rotterdam Ahoy	Rotterdam, Netherlands
5	Glory 86	May 27, 2023	Grugahalle	Essen, Germany
6	Glory: Collision 5	June 17, 2023	Rotterdam Ahoy	Rotterdam, Netherlands
7	Glory 87	August 19, 2023	Rotterdam Ahoy	Rotterdam, Netherlands
8	Glory 88	September 9, 2023	Dôme de Paris	Paris, France
9	House of Glory	October 7. 2023	Studio	Netherlands
10	Glory 89	October 7, 2023	Arena Burgas	Burgas, Bulgaria
11	Glory: Collision 6	November 4, 2023	Gelredome	Arnhem, Netherlands
12	Glory 90	December 23, 2023	RTM Stage	Rotterdam, Netherlands

== Glory Rivals 5 ==
Glory Rivals 5
- Promotion: Glory; War of Nation
- Date: January 28, 2023
- Venue: Zamna Tulum
- City: Tulum, Mexico

Glory Rivals 5 was a kickboxing event held by Glory in partnership with War of Nation on January 28, 2023, in Tulum, Mexico.

=== Background ===
The event was headlined by a featherweight bout between Abraham Vidales and promotional newcomer Tomás Aguirre.

=== Fight Card ===
Glory Rivals 5
Weight				Method	Round	Time	Notes
Featherweight 65 kg	(Mexico) Abraham Vidales	def.	(Argentina) Tomás Aguirre	Decision (Unanimous)	3	3:00	
Welterweight 77 kg	(Argentina) Javier Aparicio	def.	(Brazil) Jonas Julio	KO (Uppercut)	1	1:10	
Middleweight 85 kg	(Chile) Ivan Galaz	def.	(Brazil) Renan Altamiro	Decision (Unanimous)	3	3:00	
Featherweight 65 kg	(Argentina) Marcos Rios	def.	(Germany) Denis Wosik	Decision (Split)	3	3:00	
Lightweight 70 kg	(Sweden) Magnus Andersson	def.	(Brazil) Bruno Gazani	Decision (Split)	3	3:00	
Super Bantamweight 55 kg	(Argentina) Giuliana Cosnard	def.	(Netherlands) Tessa De Kom	Decision (Unanimous)	3	3:00	

== Glory 83 ==
Glory 83
- Promotion: Glory
- Date: February 11, 2023
- Venue: Grugahalle
- City: Essen, Germany

Glory 83 was a kickboxing event held by Glory on February 11, 2023, in Essen, Germany.

=== Background ===
Two championships bouts were booked for the event: Sergej Maslobojev made his maiden Glory Light Heavyweight Championship defense against Donegi Abena, while Donovan Wisse was expected to make his second Glory Middleweight Championship defense against César Almeida. However, Almeida missed weight and the bout was changed to a three-round, non-title match.

A welterweight bout between Joilton Lutterbach and Dynamite Fighting Show's Diaguely Camara, ranked No.1 light heavyweight in France, took place at the event.

A lightweight bout between former OSS Fighters top contender Chris Wunn and promotional newcomer and current SUPERKOMBAT World Super Lightweight Champion Jonathan Mayezo was scheduled for the event.

A lightweight bout between undefeated promotional newcomer and former Colosseum Tournament super lightweight and lightweight double-world champion Sorin Căliniuc and former SUPERKOMBAT World Middleweight Championship challenger (also former ISKA World Light Middleweight Champion) Arman Hambaryan took place at the event.

=== Fight Card ===
Glory 83
Weight				Method	Round	Time	Notes
Light Heavyweight 95 kg	(Suriname) Donegi Abena	def.	(Lithuania) Sergej Maslobojev (c)	TKO (doctor stoppage)	4	2:15	For the Glory Light Heavyweight Championship
Middleweight 85 kg	(Suriname) Donovan Wisse	def.	(Brazil) César Almeida	Decision (Unanimous)	3	3:00	Almeida missed weight (86 kg)
Middleweight 85 kg	(Turkey) Serkan Ozcaglayan	def.	(Germany) Sergej Braun	KO (Left hook)	2	2:40	
Lightweight 70 kg	(France) Guerric Billet	def.	(Germany) Cihad Akipa	Decision (Split)	3	3:00	
Heavyweight 95+ kg	(Morocco) Nabil Khachab	def.	(Estonia) Uku Jürjendal	Decision (Unanimous)	3	3:00	
Featherweight 65 kg	(Germany) Ahmad Chikh Mousa	def.	(Albania) Berjan Peposhi	Decision (Unanimous)	3	3:00	
Welterweight 77 kg	(Netherlands) Robin Ciric	def.	(Netherlands) Jos van Belzen	Decision (split)	3	3:00	
Prelims
Lightweight 70 kg	(Germany) Chris Wunn	def.	(France) Jonathan Mayezo	Decision (Unanimous)	3	3:00	
Lightweight 70 kg	(Belgium) Arman Hambaryan	def.	(Romania) Sorin Căliniuc	Decision (Split)	3	3:00	

== Glory 84 ==
Glory 84
- Promotion: Glory
- Date: March 11, 2023
- Venue: Topsportcentrum
- City: Rotterdam, Netherlands

Glory 84 was a kickboxing event held by Glory on March 11, 2023, in Rotterdam, Netherlands.

=== Background ===
A Glory Lightweight Championship bout between current champion Tyjani Beztati and current Glory Featherweight Champion Petpanomrung Kiatmuu9 is expected to headline the event.

A light heavyweight bout between former Glory Light Heavyweight title challenger Tarik Khbabez (also the 2015 Superkombat Heavyweight World Grand Prix Winner) and Kristpas Zile is expected to take place at the event.

A welterweight bout between former WFL Welterweight Champion Jay Overmeer and Superkombat World Grand Prix II light heavyweight tournament winner Jamie Bates is expected to place as the co-main event.

A middleweight bout between former two-time WFL Middleweight Champion Ertuğrul Bayrak and former Golden Fighter Championship top contender Michael Boapeah was scheduled for the event.

A welterweight bout between undefeated promotional newcomer and former Colosseum Tournament world welterweight champion Ștefan Orza and former KOK world welterweight champion (also a promotional newcomer) Chico Kwasi.

=== Fight card ===
Glory 84
Weight				Method	Round	Time	Notes
Lightweight 70 kg	(Morocco) Tyjani Beztati (c)	def.	(Thailand) Petpanomrung Kiatmuu9	KO (Front kick)	4	1:42	For the Glory Lightweight Championship
Light heavyweight 95 kg	(Morocco) Tarik Khbabez	def.	(Spain) Daniel Toledo	TKO (Corner stoppage)	2	2:47	
Welterweight 77 kg	(Netherlands) Jay Overmeer	def.	(United Kingdom) Jamie Bates	TKO (Three knockdowns)	2	2:42	
Light Heavyweight 95 kg	(Brazil) Felipe Micheletti	def.	(Algeria) Nordine Mahieddine	Decision (Unanimous)	3	3:00	
Middleweight 85 kg	(Ghana) Michael Boapeah	def.	(Turkey) Ertuğrul Bayrak	Decision (Unanimous)	3	3:00	
Heavyweight 95+ kg	(France) Sofian Laidouni	def.	(Morocco) Nabil Khachab	Decision (Unanimous)	3	3:00	
Prelims
Welterweight 77 kg	(Netherlands) Chico Kwasi	def.	(Romania) Ștefan Orza	TKO (Knee)	2	3:00	
Heavyweight 95+ kg	(Serbia) Strahinja Mitrić	def.	(New Zealand) David Tuitupou	Decision (Unanimous)	3	3:00	

== Glory 85 ==
Glory 85
- Promotion: Glory
- Date: April 29, 2023
- Venue: Rotterdam Ahoy
- City: Rotterdam, Netherlands

Glory 85 was a kickboxing event held by Glory on April 29, 2023.

=== Background ===
The event had a four-man heavyweight tournament which served as a qualifier for the upcoming 2023 GLORY Grand Prix. Moreover, the winner of this tournament challenged for the Interim Heavyweight Championship against top ranked contender Antonio Plazibat.

=== Four Man Glory Heavyweight Tournament bracket ===
Semi-finals
(Nigeria) Tariq Osaro	KO
(Netherlands) Jahfarr Wilnis	2
(Turkey) Murat Aygün	TKO
(Bosnia and Herzegovina) Enver Sljivar	2

Final
(Nigeria) Tariq Osaro	DEC
(Turkey) Murat Aygün	3

=== Fight Card ===
Glory 85
Weight Class				Method	Round	Time	Notes
Heavyweight 95+ kg	(Nigeria) Tariq Osaro	def.	(Turkey) Murat Aygün	TKO (Punches)	3	3:00	Heavyweight Tournament Final
Welterweight 77 kg	(Curaçao) Endy Semeleer (c)	def.	(Netherlands) Murthel Groenhart	Decision (Unanimous)	5	3:00	For the Glory Welterweight Championship
Light Heavyweight 95 kg	(Morocco) Mohamed Amine	def.	(Netherlands) Michael Duut	Decision (Unanimous)	3	3:00	
Featherweight 65 kg	(Netherlands) Jan Kaffa	def.	(Albania) Berjan Peposhi	Decision (Unanimous)	3	3:00	
Heavyweight 95+ kg	(Turkey) Murat Aygün	vs.	(Bosnia and Herzegovina) Enver Šljivar	No Contest (overturned)	1	3:00	Heavyweight Tournament Semifinal. Originally a TKO win for Aygün; overturned after he tested positive for one prohibited substance.
Heavyweight 95+ kg	(Nigeria) Tariq Osaro	def.	(Netherlands) Jahfarr Wilnis	TKO (Punches)	2	1:26	Heavyweight Tournament Semifinal
Prelims
Heavyweight 95+ kg	(Serbia) Nikola Filipović	def.	(Netherlands) Fabio Kwasi	Decision (Majority)	3	3:00	Heavyweight Tournament Reserve Fight
Middleweight 85 kg	(Cameroon) Brice Kombou	def.	(Poland) Maksymilian Bratkowicz	TKO (Punches)	3	2:33	

== Glory 86 ==
Glory 86
- Promotion: Glory
- Date: May 27, 2023
- Venue: Grugahalle
- City: Essen, Germany

Glory 86 was a kickboxing event held by Glory on May 27, 2023.

=== Background ===
A Glory Featherweight Championship bout between champion Petpanomrung Kiatmuu9 and the #4 ranked featherweight contender Ahmad Chikh Mousa headlined the event.

A heavyweight bout between former Glory Heavyweight Championship challenger Benjamin Adegbuyi and Sofian Laidouni took place as the co-main event.

=== Fight Card ===
Glory 86
Weight Class				Method	Round	Time	Notes
Featherweight 65 kg	(Thailand) Petpanomrung Kiatmuu9 (c)	def.	(Germany) Ahmad Chikh Mousa	Decision (Unanimous)	5	3:00	For the Glory Featherweight Championship
Heavyweight 95+ kg	(France) Sofian Laidouni	def.	(Romania) Benjamin Adegbuyi	Decision (Unanimous)	3	3:00	Heavyweight Grand Prix Qualifier
Heavyweight 95+ kg	(Azerbaijan) Bahram Rajabzadeh	def.	(Netherlands) Luis Tavares	KO (Head kick)	1	1:58	
Lightweight 70 kg	(Germany) Enriko Kehl	def.	(France) Guerric Billet	Decision (Unanimous)	3	3:00	Glory Lightweight title eliminator.
Super Bantamweight 55 kg	(Morocco) Sarah Moussadak	def.	(Argentina) Giuliana Cosnard	Decision (Unanimous)	3	3:00	
Welterweight 77 kg	(Netherlands) Chico Kwasi	def.	(Netherlands) Robin Ciric	Decision (Unanimous)	3	3:00	
Middleweight 85 kg	(Portugal) Juri De Sousa	def.	(Brazil) Joilton Lutterbach	Decision (Unanimous)	3	3:00	
Heavyweight 95+ kg	(Estonia) Uku Jürjendal	def.	(Lithuania) Mantas Rimdeika	KO (Punch)	1	2:34	

== Glory: Collision 5 ==
Glory: Collision 5
- Promotion: Glory
- Date: June 17, 2023
- Venue: Rotterdam Ahoy
- City: Rotterdam, Netherlands

Glory: Collision 5 is an upcoming kickboxing event held by Glory on June 17, 2023.

=== Background ===
The event will host an Interim Heavyweight Championship fight between Antonio Plazibat and the winner of the Glory 85 four-man tournament.

=== Fight Card ===
Glory Collision 5
Weight Class				Method	Round	Time	Notes
Heavyweight 95+ kg	(Nigeria) Tariq Osaro	def.	(Croatia) Antonio Plazibat	KO (punches and knee)	5	2:08	For the interim Glory Heavyweight Championship.
Light Heavyweight -95 kg	(Morocco) Tarik Khbabez	def.	(Morocco) Mohamed Amine	KO (uppercut)	4	2:02	For the interim Glory Light Heavyweight Championship.
Middleweight -85 kg	(Suriname) Donovan Wisse (c)	def.	(Turkey) Serkan Ozcaglayan	Decision (unanimous)	5	3:00	For the Glory Middleweight Championship.
Welterweight -77 kg	(Curaçao) Endy Semeleer (c)	def.	(Netherlands) Jay Overmeer	Decision (unanimous)	5	3:00	For the Glory Welterweight Championship.
Light Heavyweight -95 kg	(Morocco) Ibrahim El Bouni	def.	(Brazil) Felipe Micheletti	Decision (unanimous)	3	3:00	
Middleweight -85 kg	(Ghana) Michael Boapeah	def.	(Democratic Republic of the Congo) Ulric Bokeme	TKO (retirement)	1	2:08	
Prelims
Heavyweight 95+ kg	(Morocco) Nabil Khachab	def.	(Germany) Vladimir Toktasynov	Decision (unanimous)	3	3:00	
Welterweight 77 kg	(France) Diaguely Camara	def.	(Romania) Eduard Gafencu	TKO (knee)	2	2:24	
Lightweight 70 kg	(Croatia) Andrej Kedveš	def.	(United Kingdom) Mareks Pelcis	Decision (unanimous)	3	3:00	

== Glory 87 ==
Glory 87
- Promotion: Glory
- Date: August 19, 2023
- Venue: Rotterdam Ahoy
- City: Rotterdam, Netherlands

Glory 87 was a kickboxing event held by Glory on August 19, 2023.

=== Background ===
The event saw a four-man heavyweight tournament which served as a qualifier for the upcoming 2023 GLORY Grand Prix.

=== Four Man Glory Heavyweight Tournament bracket ===
Semi-finals
(Azerbaijan) Bahram Rajabzadeh	KO
(Morocco) Mohamed Amine	2
(Estonia) Uku Jürjendal	KO
(Netherlands) Martin Terpstra	1

Final
(Azerbaijan) Bahram Rajabzadeh	DEC
(Estonia) Uku Jürjendal	3

=== Fight Card ===
Glorie 87
Weight Class				Method	Round	Time	Notes
Heavyweight 95+ kg	(Azerbaijan) Bahram Rajabzadeh	def.	(Estonia) Uku Jürjendal	Decision (Unanimous)	3	3:00	Heavyweight Tournament Final
Lightweight 70 kg	(Morocco) Tyjani Beztati (c)	def.	(Japan) Kaito	Decision (Unanimous)	5	3:00	For the Glory Lightweight title
Middleweight 85 kg	(Ghana) Michael Boapeah	def.	(Germany) Sergej Braun	Decision (Unanimous)	3	3:00	
Welterweight 77 kg	(Netherlands) Murthel Groenhart	def.	(Germany) Cihad Akipa	Decision (Unanimous)	3	3:00	
Featherweight 65 kg	(Netherlands) Jan Kaffa	def.	(Morocco) Mohamed El Hammouti	Decision (Split)	3	3:00	
Heavyweight 95+ kg	(Estonia) Uku Jürjendal	def.	(Netherlands) Martin Terpstra	TKO (2 Knockdowns)	1	2:23	Heavyweight Tournament Semifinal
Heavyweight 95+ kg	(Azerbaijan) Bahram Rajabzadeh	def.	(Morocco) Mohamed Amine	TKO (Two knockdowns)	2	2:59	Heavyweight Tournament Semifinal
Prelims
Middleweight 85 kg	(Morocco) Imad Hadar	def.	(Poland) Bartosz Muszyński	Decision (Unanimous)	3	3:00	
Heavyweight 95+ kg	(Serbia) Nikola Filipović	def.	(Romania) Cristian Ristea	Decision (Split)	3	3:00	Heavyweight Tournament Reserve Fight

== Glory 88 ==
Glory 88
- Promotion: Glory
- Date: September 9, 2023
- Venue: Dôme de Paris
- City: Paris, France

Glory 88 was a kickboxing event produced by Glory that took place on September 9, 2023.

=== Background ===
The event was headlined by a heavyweight bout between Badr Hari and James McSweeney, which furthermore served as a qualifier for the Glory Heavyweight Grand Prix. Badr Hari entered the ring and announced withdrawal from fight due to earthquake in Morocco

=== Fight Card ===
Glory 88
Weight Class				Method	Round	Time	Notes
Super Bantamweight 55 kg	(United States) Tiffany van Soest (c)	def.	(France) Sarah Moussaddak	KO (High kick)	2	1:47	For the Glory Women's Super Bantamweight Championship
Heavyweight 95+ kg	(Algeria) Nordine Mahieddine	def.	(France) Abdarhmane Coulibaly	KO (High kick)	3	2:19	
Featherweight 65 kg	(Germany) Denis Wosik	def.	(Albania) Berjan Peposhi	Decision (Split)	3	3:00	
Light Heavyweight 95 kg	(Romania) Ștefan Lătescu	def.	(France) Pascal Touré	Decision (Unanimous)	3	3:00	
Welterweight 77 kg	(Serbia) Nikola Todorović	def.	(France) Karim Ghajji	Decision (Unanimous)	3	3:00	
Lightweight 70 kg	(France) James Condé	def.	(France) Jonathan Mayezo	Decision (Unanimous)	3	3:00	
Middleweight 85 kg	(Morocco) Iliass Hammouche	def.	(Germany) Florian Kröger	Decision (Unanimous)	3	3:00	
Welterweight 77 kg	(France) Diaguely Camara	def.	(Morocco) Ilyass Chakir	Decision (Unanimous)	3	3:00	
Local Prelims (LSFC 2)
Catchweight 75 kg	(France) Axel Alfandari	def.	(Germany) Marc-Philippe Ngatchou	Decision (Unanimous)	3	3:00	
Catchweight 84 kg	(France) Théo Avon	def.	(France) Ibrahima Doukansi	Decision (Unanimous)	3	3:00	
Lightweight 70 kg	(France) Lissandre Mercier	def.	(France) Lionel Picord	Decision (Unanimous)	3	3:00	

== Glory: House of Glory ==
House of Glory
- Promotion: Glory
- Date: October 7, 2023
- Venue: Studio

Glory: House of Glory was a realityshow broadcast on Videoland in the Netherlands. The show aired between 26 August and 7 October 2023.

=== Background ===
House of Glory is a Dutch reality television show produced by Glory Kickboxing and Videoland. The show follows a group of kickboxers as they train and compete to become the next challenger for the Glory welterweight champion. The show is filmed in a luxurious penthouse in Rotterdam, the Netherlands, and features a variety of challenges, both physical and mental that the participants have to go through in teams. Rico Verhoeven and Badr Hari were featured as coaches.

=== Participants ===
- (Morocco) Soufiane Abdelkhalek
- (Netherlands) Tycho Brakel
- (Netherlands) Robin Ciric
- (Netherlands) Mike Frenken
- (Morocco) Oualid Gherbi
- (Morocco) Samir Kasrioui
- (Belgium) Cedric de Keirsmaeker
- (Netherlands) Figuereido Landman
- (Germany) Nick Morsink
- (Belgium) Jente Nnamadim
- (Morocco) Anwar Ouled-Chaib
- (Morocco) Ismail Ouzgni
- (Suriname) Guillaume Pinas
- (Suriname) Andy Ristie
- (Netherlands) Don Sno
- (Netherlands) Gino van Steenis

=== Results ===
Glorie 87
Weight Class							Method	Round	Time	Notes
Welterweight 77 kg	Episode 8	Team Badr	(Morocco) Anwar Ouled-Chaib	def.	(Netherlands) Robin Ciric	Team Badr	Decision (Split)	3	3:00	Final
Welterweight 77 kg	Episode 7	Team Badr	(Netherlands) Robin Ciric	def.	(Netherlands) Figuereido Landman	Team Rico	Decision (Unanimous)	3	3:00	Semifinal
Welterweight 77 kg	Episode 6	Team Badr	(Morocco) Anwar Ouled-Chaib	def.	(Netherlands) Mike Frenken	Team Rico	Decision (Split)	3	3:00	Semifinal
Welterweight 77 kg	Episode 5	Team Rico	(Netherlands) Figuereido Landman	def.	(Suriname) Andy Ristie	Team Badr	Decision (Unanimous)	3	3:00	Quarterfinal
Welterweight 77 kg	Episode 4	Team Rico	(Netherlands) Mike Frenken	def.	(Morocco) Ismail Ouzgni	Team Badr	Decision (Split)	3	3:00	Quarterfinal
Welterweight 77 kg	Episode 3	Team Badr	(Netherlands) Robin Circ	def.	(Morocco) Soufiane Abdelkalek	Team Rico	Decision (Unanimous)	3	3:00	Quarterfinal
Welterweight 77 kg	Episode 2	Team Badr	(Morocco) Anwar Ouled-Chaib	def.	(Netherlands) Dom Sno	Team Rico	Decision (Unanimous)	3	3:00	Quarterfinal
Prelims
Welterweight 77 kg	Episode 1	Team Rico	(Belgium) Cedric de Keirsmaeker	def.	(Germany) Nick Morsink	Team Rico	Decision (Unanimous)	3	3:00	Reserve Fight
Welterweight 77 kg	Episode 1	Team Badr	(Netherlands) Gino van Steenis	def.	(Morocco) Samir Kasrioui	Team Badr	TKO (Calf kicks)	2	0:41	Reserve Fight

=== Bracket ===
Quarter-finals
Don Sno	UD
Anwar Ouled-Chaib	DEC
Mike Frenken	DEC
Ismail Ouzgni	SD
Robin Ciric	DEC
Soufiane Abdelkalek	UD
Figuereido Landman	DEC
Andy Ristie	UD

Semi-finals
Anwar Ouled-Chaib	DEC
Mike Frenken	SD
Robin Ciric	DEC
Figueiredo Landman	UD

Final
Anwar Ouled-Chaib	DEC
Robin Ciric	SD

== Glory 89 ==
Glory 89
- Promotion: Glory
- Date: October 7, 2023
- Venue: Arena Burgas
- City: Burgas, Bulgaria

Glory 89 was a kickboxing event produced by Glory that took place on October 7, 2023.

=== Background ===
The event was headlined by a title bout between Glory featherweight champion Petpanomrung Kiatmuu9 and the promotional newcomer David Mejia. A lightweight rematch between former Glory Lightweight Championship challenger Stoyan Koprivlenski and former Colosseum Tournament World Lightweight Champion Sorin Căliniuc served as the co-headliner.

=== Fight Card ===
Glory 89
Weight Class				Method	Round	Time	Notes
Featherweight 65 kg	(Thailand) Petpanomrung Kiatmuu9 (c)	def.	(Spain) David Mejía	Decision (Split)	5	3:00	For the Glory Featherweight title
Lightweight 70 kg	(Bulgaria) Stoyan Koprivlenski	def.	(Romania) Sorin Căliniuc	Decision (Unanimous)	3	3:00	
Heavyweight 95+ kg	(Netherlands) Levi Rigters	def.	(Moldova) Ion Taburceanu	KO (Low Kicks)	1	1:55	2023 Heavyweight Grand Prix Qualifier
Heavyweight 95+ kg	(Estonia) Uku Jürjendal	def.	(Morocco) Badr Hari	TKO (4 Knockdowns)	2	0:47	2023 Heavyweight Grand Prix Qualifier
Catchweight 100 kg	(Romania) Bogdan Stoica	def.	(Netherlands) Luis Tavares	Decision (Unanimous)	3	3:00	
Middleweight 85 kg	(Bulgaria) Aleksandar Petrov	def.	(Austria) Karim Mabrouk	Decision (Unanimous)	3	3:00	
Middleweight 85 kg	(Morocco) Mohamed Touchassie	def.	(Bulgaria) Eduard Aleksanyan	TKO (3 Knockdowns)	2	2:00	
Prelims
Welterweight 77 kg	(Bulgaria) Teodor Hristov	def.	(Romania) Eduard Gafencu	Decision (Unanimous)	3	3:00	
Lightweight 70 kg	(Bulgaria) Dragomir Petrov	def.	(Germany) Chris Wunn	Decision (Split)	3	3:00	

== Glory: Collision 6 ==
Glory: Collision 6
- Promotion: Glory
- Date: November 4, 2023
- Venue: GelreDome
- City: Arnhem, Netherlands

Glory: Collision 6 is a kickboxing event held by Glory on November 4, 2023.

=== Background ===
The event will host a Heavyweight Championship fight between reigning champion Rico Verhoeven and interim champion Tariq Osaro.

=== Fight Card ===
Glory Collision 6
Weight Class				Method	Round	Time	Notes
Heavyweight 95+ kg	(Netherlands) Rico Verhoeven (c)	def.	(Nigeria) Tariq Osaro (ic)	Decision (Unanimous)	5	3:00	For the unification of Glory Heavyweight Championship.
Light Heavyweight 95 kg	(Suriname) Donegi Abena (c)	def.	(Morocco) Mohamed Touchassie	Decision (Unanimous)	5	3:00	For the Glory Light Heavyweight Championship.
Middleweight 85 kg	(Suriname) Donovan Wisse (c)	def.	(Ghana) Michael Boapeah	Decision (Unanimous)	5	3:00	For the Glory Middleweight Championship.
Welterweight 77 kg	(Morocco) Hamicha	def.	(France) Diaguely Camara	Decision (Split)	3	3:00	
Middleweight 85 kg	(Switzerland) Ulric Bokeme	def.	(Turkey) Serkan Özçağlayan	Decision (Unanimous)	3	3:00	
Welterwieght 77 kg	(Netherlands) Chico Kwasi	def.	(Netherlands) Jay Overmeer	Decision (Split)	3	3:00	
Light Heavyweight 95 kg	(Romania) Ștefan Lătescu	def.	(Morocco) Ibrahim El Bouni	TKO (3 Knockdowns)	2	1:00	Glory Light Heavyweight Title Eliminator
Catchweight	(Mexico) Abraham Vidales	def.	(Germany) Ahmad Chikh Mousa	TKO (Punches)	1	1:13	Chikh Mousa missed the contracted weight of 65kg by 1.6kg.
Prelims
Welterweight 77 kg	(Netherlands) Don Sno	def.	(Netherlands) Gino van Steenis	TKO (3 Knockdowns)	2	2:59	
Welterweight 77 kg	(Morocco) Ismail Ouzgni	def.	(Netherlands) Robin Ciric	Decision (Unanimous)	3	3:00	
Welterweight 77 kg	(Netherlands) Figuereido Landman	def.	(Brazil) Petros Freitas	Decision (Split)	3	3:00	

== Glory 90 ==
Glory 90
- Promotion: Glory
- Date: December 23, 2023
- Venue: RTM Stage
- City: Rotterdam, Netherlands

Glory 90 is a kickboxing event held by Glory on December 23, 2023 in Rotterdam, Netherlands.

=== Background ===
The event will host a Welterweight Championship fight between reigning champion Endy Semeleer and challenger Anwar Ouled-Chaib.

=== Fight Card ===
Glory 90
Weight Class				Method	Round	Time	Notes
Welterweight 77 kg	(Curaçao) Endy Semeleer (c)	def.	(Morocco) Anwar Ouled-Chaib	TKO (3 Knockdowns)	1	1:53	For the Glory Welterweight Championship.
Heavyweight +95 kg	(Morocco) Nabil Khachab	def.	(Serbia) Nikola Filipovic	Decision (Unanimous)	3	3:00	2024 Heavyweight Grand Prix qualifier bout.
Welterweight 77 kg	(Bulgaria) Teodor Hristov	def.	(Netherlands) Murthel Groenhart	Decision (Unanimous)	3	3:00	
Lightweight 70 kg	(Germany) Enriko Kehl	def.	(Belgium) Arman Hambaryan	TKO (Standing 10 Count)	3	0:20	
Catchweight 67 kg	(Albania) Berjan Peposhi	def.	(Portugal) Miguel Trindade	Decision (Split)	3	3:00	
Middleweight 85 kg	(Morocco) Mohamed Touchassie	def.	(Cameroon) Brice Kombou	TKO (3 Knockdowns)	1	1:52	
Prelims
Heavyweight +95 kg	(Turkey) Cihad Kepenek	def.	(Poland) Michal Blawdziewicz	Decision (Split)	3	3:00	
Super Bantamweight 55 kg	(Netherlands) Nina van Dalum	def.	(Portugal) Débora Évora	Decision (Unanimous)	3	3:00	

== See also ==
- List of current GLORY fighters
- 2023 in ONE Championship
- 2023 in K-1
- 2023 in RISE
- 2023 in Romanian kickboxing
- 2023 in Wu Lin Feng
