= Don Sno =

Dutch-Surinamese kickboxer

- Born: Don Jelayo-Soemotiko; June 24, 2001 (age 25); Amsterdam, Netherlands
- Height: 179 cm (5 ft 10 in)
- Weight: 77 kg (170 lb; 12.1 st)
- Style: Kickboxing, Muay Thai
- Stance: Orthodox
- Fighting out of: Amsterdam, Netherlands
- Team: Vos Gym; Petres Gym (former); Atlas gym (former)
- Trainer: Ivan Hippolyte; Clyde Petres (former); Omar Gassa (former)

Kickboxing record
- Total: 11
- Wins: 7
- By knockout: 3
- Losses: 4
- By knockout: 0

Other information
- Website: https://donsno.nl/

Don Sno (born June 24, 2001) is a Dutch-Surinamese kickboxer, currently competing in the welterweight 79 kg division of Glory.

He was previously ranked as the seventh best lightweight 71 kg kickboxer in the world by Combat Press in 2025.

== Early life ==
Born in Amsterdam on June 24, 2001, Don Sno started training in kickboxing and Muay Thai when he was 10.

== Background ==
=== Youth career ===
In his Youth career Sno was multiple time national champion and youth European champion.

=== Amateur career ===
After his dominance in the youth level, Sno moved to C - class and won a European champion.

On March 9, 2019, Sno travelled to Estonia to face Sergei Makejev in the semifinal of a 4-man tournament at the Yakuza Fight 5 event. He lost the fight by decision.

=== Semi pro career ===
In 2019, he won the B class World Championship.

== Pro career ==
Sno won his A-class debut by knockout against Abdel Hafdi on May 27, 2023.

In July 2023, Sno was selected to be part of the reality TV show House of Glory designed to scout new talents for the Glory promotion. He was part of Team Rico and in November 2023, Sno faced Anwar Ouled-Chaib in the quarterfinals of the tournament. Sno lost the fight by unanimous decision.

Sno faced Nikola Cvetković at Hektor Fight Night 4 in Bosnia on September 8, 2023. He won the fight by split decision.

In November 2023, Don Sno made his official debut for the Glory promotion in the event Glory: Collision 6, when he went against Gino van Steenis in which Sno managed to drop Gino thrice winning the fight by finish in round two.

On May 18, 2024, Don Sno faced Figuereido Landman at Glory 92. He won the fight by unanimous decision.

Sno faced Mehdi Ait El Hadj at Glory 93 on July 20, 2024. He lost the fight by unanimous decision.

Sno faced Ismail Ayadi at Glory 95 on February 25, 2025. He won the fight by a second-round knockout.

Sno faced Younes Smaili at Glory Underground on May 1, 2025. He won the fight by split decision.

Sno faced Tayfun Özcan at Glory 103 on August 23, 2025. He won the fight by split decision.

In December 2025, Sno fought against Endy Semeleer in the Glory Collision 8 - Welterweight Tournament, Semifinals and lost by decision.

In September 2026, Sno fought against Jay Overmeer in Glory 109 and lost by decision.

Sno is scheduled to fight against Hamicha in October 2026, in the event Glory 110.

== Fight record ==
Kickboxing record
7 Wins (3 (T)KO's), 4 Losses, 0 Draws
Date	Result	Opponent	Event	Location	Method	Round	Time
2026-09-05	Loss	(Netherlands) Jay Overmeer	Glory 109	Rotterdam, Netherlands	Decision (Unanimous)	3	3:00
2025-12-13	Loss	(Netherlands) Endy Semeleer	Glory Collision 8 - Welterweight Tournament, Semifinals	Arnhem, Netherlands	Decision (Unanimous)	3	3:00
2025-08-23	Win	(Turkey) Tayfun Özcan	Glory 103	Rotterdam, Netherlands	Decision (Split)	3	3:00
2025-05-01	Win	(Morocco) Younes Smaili	Glory Underground	Miami, United States	Decision (Split)	3	3:00
2025-02-22	Win	(Morocco) Ismail Ayaadi	Glory 98	Rotterdam, Netherlands	TKO (Punches)	2	2:01
2024-07-20	Loss	(Morocco) Mehdi Ait El Hadj	Glory 93	Rotterdam, Netherlands	Decision (Unanimous)	3	3:00
2024-05-18	Win	(Netherlands) Figuereido Landman	Glory 92	Rotterdam, Netherlands	Decision (Unanimous)	3	3:00
2023-11-04	Win	(Netherlands) Gino van Steenis	Glory: Collision 6	Arnhem, Netherlands	TKO (3 knockdowns)	2	2:57
2023-09-08	Win	(Serbia) Nikola Cvetković	Hektor Fight Night 4	Banja Luka, Bosnia and Herzegovina	Decision (Split)	3	3:00
2023-07-	Loss	(Morocco) Anwar Ouled-Chaib	House of Glory, Tournament Quarterfinals	Netherlands	Decision (Unanimous)	3	3:00
2023-05-27	Win	(Belgium) Abdel Hafid	Fightersheart goes Veenendaal	Veenendaal, Netherlands	KO (Left hook)	1	2:24
A-class debut.

Amateur Kickboxing record
Date	Result	Opponent	Event	Location	Method	Round	Time
2019-06-10	Win	(Netherlands) Mohamed el Hachemi	Welcome To The Octagon 3	The Hague, Netherlands	Decision	5	2:00
2019-03-09	Loss	(Estonia) Sergei Makejev	Yakuza Fight 5, Semifinals	Rakvere, Estonia	Decision	3	3:00
2019-02-17	Win	(Netherlands) Jeffrey Nijhoff	World Fighting League	Almere, Netherlands	TKO	2	
2018-12-02	Win	(Netherlands) Othmane Boudraa	Fightclub Den Haag on Tour	The Hague, Netherlands	Decision	5	2:00
Legend: Win Loss Draw/No contest Notes

Amateur Muay Thai record
Date	Result	Opponent	Event	Location	Method	Round	Time
2017-08-07	Loss	(Australia) Damon Nelson	2017 IFMA World Youth Championship, Quarterfinals	Bangkok, Thailand	Decision	3	3:00
Legend: Win Loss Draw/No contest Notes

== See also ==
- List of male kickboxers
