= 2022 in Glory =

Kickboxing events

Information
- First date: March 19
- Last date: December 25

Events
- Total events: 9
- Rivals: 4

Fights
- Total fights: 55
- Title fights: 8

The year 2022 was the eleventh year in the history of Glory, an international kickboxing promotion.

Glory 80 and Glory 80 Studio were available exclusively through the Glory Fights Pay-per-view platform. Later events were broadcast on various streaming services and television channels around the world and also streamed on the Glory Fights Pay-per-view platform.

== List of events ==
#	Event Title	Date	Arena	Location
1	Glory 80	March 19, 2022	Trixxo Arena	Hasselt, Belgium
2	Glory 80 Studio	May 14, 2022	Sportcentrum Valkenhuizen	Arnhem, Netherlands
3	Glory Rivals 1	June 11, 2022	Zwembad Hoornse Vaart	Alkmaar, Netherlands
4	Glory 81: Ben Saddik vs. Adegbuyi 2	August 20, 2022	Castello	Düsseldorf, Germany
5	Glory Rivals 2	September 17, 2022	De Meent	Alkmaar, Netherlands
6	Glory: Collision 4	October 8, 2022	GelreDome	Arnhem, Netherlands
7	Glory Rivals 3	November 5, 2022	Sporthallen Zuid	Amsterdam, Netherlands
8	Glory 82	November 19, 2022	Maritim Hotel	Bonn, Germany
9	Glory Rivals Japan	December 25, 2022	Ryōgoku Kokugikan	Tokyo, Japan

== Glory 2022 Awards ==
The following fighters won the GLORY Kickboxing year-end awards for 2022:

- Glory Fighter of the Year 2022: Antonio Plazibat
- Glory Fight of the Year 2022: Sergej Maslobojev vs. Tarik Khbabez (Glory: Collision 4)
- Glory Knockout of the Year 2022: Antonio Plazibat vs. Raul Cătinaș (Glory 82)
- Glory Newcomer of the Year 2022: Endy Semeleer

== Glory 80 ==
Glory 80
- Promotion: Glory
- Date: March 19, 2022
- Venue: Trixxo Arena
- City: Hasselt, Belgium

Event chronology
Glory: Collision 3	Glory 80

Glory 80 was a kickboxing event held by Glory on March 19, 2022, at the Trixxo Arena in Hasselt, Belgium.

=== Background ===
A Glory Light Heavyweight Championship bout between reigning champion Artem Vakhitov and title challenger Luis Tavares was booked as the event headliner. Tavares withdrew from the bout a week before it was supposed to take place and was replaced by Tarik Khbabez, who faced Vakhitov in a catchweight bout. The bout was cancelled on March 12, as Vakhitov himself withdrew.

A Glory Women's Super Bantamweight Championship between the champion Tiffany van Soest and title challenger Manazo Kobayashi was announced for the event. RISE Women's Flyweight champion Kobayashi joined as part of the organizations cross-promotion agreement.

Former K-1 and It's Showtime Heavyweight champion Badr Hari was booked to rematch Arkadiusz Wrzosek. The two previously met at Glory 78, with Wrzosek winning by knockout.

A heavyweight bout between Levi Rigters and two-time Glory heavyweight title challenger Jamal Ben Saddik was scheduled for the main card.

A lightweight bout between Guerric Billet and promotional newcomer Nordin Ben Moh was scheduled for the event.

The #1 ranked Glory middleweight Ertuğrul Bayrak was booked to face the #4 ranked Serkan Ozcaglayan.

During Hari vs. Wrzosek Legia Warszawa Ultras started a riot and the rest of the event was cancelled over security concerns.

=== Results ===
Glory: 80
Weight Class				Method	Round	Time	Notes
Heavyweight 95+ kg	(Netherlands) Levi Rigters	-	(Morocco) Jamal Ben Saddik	Cancelled			
Heavyweight 95+ kg	(Poland) Arkadiusz Wrzosek	-	(Morocco) Badr Hari	Draw	2	3:00	Fight cancelled after riots broke out during the fight, later ruled a Draw
Super Bantamweight 55 kg	(United States) Tiffany van Soest (c)	def.	(Japan) Manazo Kobayashi	TKO (Maximum Knockdowns)	5	2:56	For the Glory Women's Super Bantamweight Championship
Lightweight 70 kg	(France) Guerric Billet	def.	(Morocco) Nordin Ben Moh	Decision (Unanimous)	3	3:00	
Middleweight 85 kg	(Turkey) Serkan Ozcaglayan	def.	(Turkey) Ertuğrul Bayrak	Decision (Unanimous)	3	3:00	
Preliminary card
Lightweight 70 kg	(Netherlands) Jay Overmeer	def.	(Netherlands) Jos van Belzen	TKO (3 knockdowns)	2	2:47	

== Glory 80 Studio ==
Glory 80 Studio
- Promotion: Glory
- Date: May 14, 2022
- Venue: Sportcentrum Valkenhuizen
- City: Arnhem, Netherlands

Glory 80 Studio, also known as Glory 80+, was a kickboxing event held by Glory on May 14, 2022, at the Sportcentrum Valkenhuizen in Arnhem, Netherlands.

=== Background ===
Three fights were announced for the card on April 7, 2022: A Glory Lightweight Championship between the champion Tyjani Beztati and title challenger Josh Jauncey; a heavyweight bout between Antonio Plazibat and Tarik Khbabez; a heavyweight bout between OSS Fighters' Tariq Osaro and Rhys Brudenell.

=== Results ===
Glory 80 Studio
Weight Class				Method	Round	Time	Notes
Lightweight 70 kg	(Morocco) Tyjani Beztati (c)	def.	(Canada) Josh Jauncey	TKO (3 Knockdowns)	2	2:25	For the Glory Lightweight Championship
Heavyweight 95+ kg	(Croatia) Antonio Plazibat	def.	(Morocco) Tarik Khbabez	KO (Punch)	3	0:51	
Heavyweight 95+ kg	(Nigeria) Tariq Osaro	def.	(England) Rhys Brudenell	TKO (Punches)	3	0:29	

== Glory Rivals 1 ==
Glory Rivals 1
- Promotion: Glory; Enfusion
- Date: June 11, 2022
- Venue: Zwembad Hoornse Vaart
- City: Alkmaar, Netherlands

Glory Rivals 1 was a kickboxing event held by Glory in partnership with Enfusion on June 11, 2022, at the Zwembad Hoornse Vaart in Alkmaar, Netherlands.

=== Results ===
Glory: Rivals 1
Weight Class				Method	Round	Time	Notes
Light Heavyweight 95 kg	(Netherlands) Luis Tavares	def.	(France) Florent Kaouachi	KO (Left hook)	3	0:27	Tavares tested positive for one prohibited substance.
Light Heavyweight 95 kg	(Morocco) Ibrahim El Bouni	def.	(Suriname) Clyde Brunswijk	Decision (Unanimous)	3	3:00	
Welterweight 77 kg	(Netherlands) Regilio van den Ent	def.	(England) Joe Johnson	KO (Liver punch)	1	1:35	
Heavyweight 95+ kg	(Netherlands) Martin Terpstra	def.	(Turkey) Muhammed Balli	TKO (Leg injury)	2	0:25	
Welterweight 77 kg	(Netherlands) Jay Overmeer	def.	(Brazil) Rodrigo Mineiro	KO (Knee)	2	0:55	
Enfusion 108
Lightweight 70 kg	(Morocco) Younes Smaili	def.	(Belgium) Conan Saelens	Decision (Unanimous)	3	3:00	
Welterweight 77 kg	(Morocco) Salah Hitou	def.	(Netherlands) Yannick van Vliet	Decision (Unanimous)	3	3:00	
Light Heavyweight 95 kg	(Netherlands) Steven van den Broek	def.	(Netherlands) Raymon Bonte	KO (Spinning Back Kick)	1	2:11	
Bantamweight 61 kg	(Morocco) Youssef Madi	def.	(Morocco) Adil Bougzir	KO (Flying Knee)	2	`0:54	
Welterweight 77 kg	(Morocco) Ismael Ouzgni	def.	(Netherlands) Jimmy van Kuijeren	Decision (Unanimous)	3	3:00	
Enfusion Talents 91
Bantamweight 61 kg	(Netherlands) Robin GilleBaard	def.	(Brazil) Diego Barbosa	KO (Punch to The Body)	1	1:07	
Bantamweight 61 kg	(Netherlands) Bas Willemse	def.	(Morocco) Marouane Elkass	Decision (Unanimous)	3	3:00	
Bantamweight 61 kg	(Netherlands) Bilal el Alaoui	def.	(Hungary) Renato Goman	TKO (3 Knockdowns)	1	3:00	
Lightweight 70 kg	(Egypt) Zidane el Biali	def.	(Netherlands) Bjorn Peetoom	Decision (Unanimous)	3	3:00	
Featherweight 65 kg	(England) Levi Thompson	def.	(Brazil) Gilvan Gomez	Decision (Unanimous)	3	3:00	

== Glory 81: Ben Saddik vs. Adegbuyi 2 ==
Glory 81: Ben Saddik vs. Adegbuyi 2
- The poster for Glory 81: Ben Saddik vs. Adegbuyi 2
- Promotion: Glory
- Date: August 20, 2022
- Venue: Castello
- City: Düsseldorf, Germany

Glory 81: Ben Saddik vs. Adegbuyi 2 was a kickboxing event held by Glory on August 20, 2022, at the Castello in Düsseldorf, Germany.

=== Background ===
A heavyweight bout between former two-time Glory Heavyweight Championship challenger and three-time tournament winner Benjamin Adegbuyi and also former two-time Glory Heavyweight Championship challenger and 2018 Glory Heavyweight Grand Prix winner Jamal Ben Saddik served as the event headliner. The pairing previously met in 2018 prior at Glory 62: Rotterdam.

A Glory Light Heavyweight Championship bout for the vacant title between Luis Tavares and Sergej Maslobojev was originally booked for Glory 81. However, the bout was scrapped due to Tavares testing positive for an unspecified banned substance at Glory Rivals 1.

=== Results ===
Glory: 81
Weight Class				Method	Round	Time	Notes
Heavyweight 95+ kg	(Morocco) Jamal Ben Saddik	vs.	(Romania) Benjamin Adegbuyi	No Contest (overturned)	1	2:34	Originally a KO win for Ben Saddik; overturned after he tested positive for at least one prohibited substance.
Middleweight 85 kg	(Suriname) Donovan Wisse (c)	def.	(Portugal) Juri De Sousa	Decision (Unanimous)	5	3:00	For the Glory Middleweight Championship
Heavyweight 95+ kg	(Turkey) Cihad Kepenek	def.	(France) Nordine Mahieddine	KO (Punch)	1	2:52	
Lightweight 70 kg	(Germany) Chihk Mousa	def.	(Morocco) Rafik Habiat	KO (Punch)	1	3:00	
Lightweight 70 kg	(Bulgaria) Stoyan Koprivlenski	def.	(France) Guerric Billet	Decision (Unanimous)	3	3:00	
Featherweight 65 kg	(Germany) Dennis Wosik	def.	(Japan) Naoki	Decision (Unanimous)	3	3:00	
Preliminary card
Middleweight 85 kg	(Ghana) Michael Boapeah	def.	(Germany) Florian Kröger	Decision (Unanimous)	3	3:00	
Lightweight 70 kg	(Germany) Chris Wunn	def.	(Morocco) Ilias Darrazi	Decision (Unanimous)	3	3:00	

== Glory Rivals 2 ==
Glory Rivals 2
- Promotion: Glory; Enfusion
- Date: September 17, 2022
- Venue: De Meent
- City: Alkmaar, Netherlands

Glory Rivals 2 is a scheduled kickboxing event held jointly by Glory and Enfusion on September 17, 2022, at the De Meent in Alkmaar, Netherlands.

=== Background ===
The event was headlined by a welterweight bout between promotional newcomers Endy Semeleer and Robin Ciric. Ciric withdrew from the fight in August 29, and was replaced by Shkodran Veseli.

=== Fight Card ===
Glory Rivals 2
Weight Class				Method	Round	Time	Notes
Welterweight 77 kg	(Curaçao) Endy Semeleer	def.	(Albania) Shkodran Veseli	KO (Right hook)	3	1:05	
Light heavyweight 93 kg	(Morocco) Ibrahim El Bouni	def.	(Morocco) Badr Ferdaous	Decision (Unanimous)	3	3:00	
Welterweight 77 kg	(Netherlands) Jos van Belzen	def.	(Netherlands) Regilio van den Ent	Decision (Unanimous)	3	3:00	
Light heavyweight 93 kg	(Suriname) Clyde Brunswijk	def.	(Turkey) Muhammed Balli	KO (Knee to the body)	2	2:35	
Welterweight 77 kg	(Belgium) Franck Rubanguka	def.	(Netherlands) Jimmy van Kuijeren	Decision (Unanimous)	3	3:00	
Enfusion 110
Heavyweight 95+ kg	(Netherlands) Martin Terpstra	def.	(Morocco) Nidal Bchiri	KO (Right hook)	3	0:33	For the vacant Enfusion Heavyweight World Championship
Lightweight 70 kg	(Egypt) Amier Abdulahad	def.	(Belgium) Conan Saelens	Decision (Unanimous)	3	3:00	
Bantamweight 61 kg	(Turkey) Muhammed Simsek	def.	(Belgium) Saber Tabi	TKO (Three knockdowns)	1	2:28	
Bantamweight 61 kg	(Morocco) Rida Bellahcen	def.	(Morocco) Ilias Banniss	Decision (Unanimous)	3	3:00	
W.Flyweight 57 kg	(Netherlands) Nina van Dalum	def.	(Belgium) Hélène Connart (c)	Decision (Unanimous)	5	2:00	For the Enfusion Women's Flyweight World Championship
Enfusion Talents 93
W.Strawweight 52 kg	(Netherlands) Tessa de Kom	def.	(Dominican Republic) Suhailey Albertus	Decision (Unanimous)	5	2:00	For the vacant Enfusion Women's Strawweight World Championship
Featherweight 65 kg	(Somalia) Jess van Hunen	def.	(Italy) Tariq Mannan	Decision (Unanimous)	3	3:00	
W.Flyweight 57 kg	(Netherlands) Sarel de Jong	def.	(Portugal) Sofia Oliveira	Decision (Unanimous)	3	3:00	
Lightweight 70 kg	(Suriname) Milton Dokman	def.	(Netherlands) Bilal el Alaoui	TKO (Doctor stoppage)	2	1:09	
Middleweight 85 kg	(Netherlands) Robbie Kappetijn	def.	(Poland) Szymon Nawotka	Decision (Unanimous)	3	3:00	
Prelims
Lightweight 70 kg	(Netherlands) Ayoub Bourass	vs.	(Netherlands) Chergel Daal				
W.Lightweight 70 kg	(Belgium) Selma el Hassouni	vs.	(Netherlands) Gina Weerdenburg				
Welterweight 77 kg	(Netherlands) Guiilaume Pinas	vs.	(Netherlands) Jerome Trappenburg				
Welterweight 77 kg	(Somalia) Zeceria Musa	vs.	(Morocco) Mohammed Ali Addi				

== Glory: Collision 4 ==
Glory: Collision 4
- The poster for Glory: Collision 4
- Promotion: Glory
- Date: October 8, 2022
- Venue: GelreDome
- City: Arnhem, Netherlands

Glory: Collision 4 was a kickboxing event held by Glory on October 8, 2022, at the GelreDome in Arnhem, Netherlands.

=== Background ===
The main event is scheduled to be a bout between Badr Hari and former K-1 champion Alistair Overeem in a trilogy bout.

Antonio Plazibat was expected to face the winner of Jamal Ben Saddik and Benjamin Adegbuyi for the interim Glory Heavyweight Championship. On September 1, Glory confirmed that the bout would not take place, as the fighters refused to face each other.

A Glory Women's Super Bantamweight Championship between the champion Tiffany van Soest and title challenger Sarah Moussaddak was booked for the event.

A Glory Light Heavyweight Championship bout for the vacant title between Sergej Maslobojev and former 2015 SUPERKOMBAT World Grand Prix Heavyweight Tournament Winner Tarik Khbabez took place at the event. Maslobojev was initially expected to face Luis Tavares, who withdrew from the fight on August 10.

=== Fight Card ===
Glory: Collision 4
Weight Class				Method	Round	Time	Notes
Heavyweight 95+ kg	(Netherlands) Alistair Overeem	vs.	(Morocco) Badr Hari	No Contest (overturned)	3	3:00	Originally a decision win for Overeem. Later changed to a No Contest after he tested positive for performance-enhancing drugs.
Super Bantamweight 55 kg	(United States) Tiffany van Soest (c)	def.	(France) Sarah Moussaddak	Decision (Unanimous)	5	3:00	For the Glory Women's Super Bantamweight Championship
Light Heavyweight 95 kg	(Lithuania) Sergej Maslobojev	def.	(Morocco) Tarik Khbabez	Decision (Split)	5	3:00	For the vacant Glory Light Heavyweight Championship
Lightweight 70 kg	(Morocco) Tyjani Beztati (c)	def.	(Bulgaria) Stoyan Koprivlenski	Decision (Split)	5	3:00	For the Glory Lightweight Championship
Featherweight 66 kg	(Thailand) Petpanomrung Kiatmuu9 (c)	def.	(Mexico) Abraham Vidales	Decision (Unanimous)	5	3:00	For the Glory Featherweight Championship
Heavyweight 95+ kg	(Netherlands) Levi Rigters	def.	(Nigeria) Tariq Osaro	Decision (Unanimous)	3	3:00	
Preliminary card
Middleweight 85 kg	(Brazil) César Almeida	def.	(Turkey) Serkan Ozcaglayan	Decision (Unanimous)	3	3:00	
Light Heavyweight 95 kg	(Suriname) Donegi Abena	def.	(Brazil) Felipe Micheletti	Decision (Unanimous)	3	3:00	
Middleweight 85 kg	(Germany) Sergej Braun	def.	(Ghana) Michael Boapeah	Decision (Majority)	3	3:00	

== Glory Rivals 3 ==
Glory Rivals 3
- Promotion: Glory; Enfusion
- Date: November 5, 2022
- Venue: Sporthallen Zuid
- City: Amsterdam, Netherlands

Glory Rivals 3 was kickboxing event held by Glory in partnership with Enfusion on November 5, 2022, at the Sporthallen Zuid in Amsterdam, Netherlands.

=== Background ===
The event was headlined by a light heavyweight bout between Ibrahim El Bouni and Muhammed Balli.

A welterweight bout between Robin Ciric and Jay Overmeer was booked as the co-main event.

=== Results ===
Glory Rivals 3
Weight Class				Method	Round	Time	Notes
Light Heavyweight 95 kg	(Morocco) Ibrahim El Bouni	def.	(Turkey) Muhammed Balli	KO (Punch)	1	2:03	
Welterweight 77 kg	(Netherlands) Jay Overmeer	def.	(Netherlands) Robin Ciric	Decision (Unanimous)	3	3:00	
Heavyweight 95+ kg	(Nigeria) Tariq Osaro	def.	(Morocco) Abderrahman Barkouch	KO (Punches)	3	2:10	
Lightweight 70 kg	(Morocco) Nordin Ben Moh	def.	(England) Kyle Todd	Decision (Unanimous)	3	3:00	
Featherweight 65 kg	(Turkey) Deniz Demirkapu	def.	(Czech Republic) Matěj Trčka	TKO (Leg Kicks)	1	1:50	
Enfusion 114
Welterweight 77 kg	(Morocco) Mohamed Touchassie	def.	(Bulgaria) Dominik Bereczki	KO (Knee to the body)	3	2:10	
Lightweight 70 kg	(Morocco) Ilias Zouggary	def.	(Germany) Artur Derksen	TKO (Three knockdowns)	2	2:08	
Welterweight 77 kg	(Morocco) Karim el Amri	def.	(Morocco) Khalid el Moukadam	KO (Head kick)	2	0:24	
Flyweight 57 kg	(Morocco) Dina Ghabri	def.	(Greece) Bairaktari	TKO (Referee stoppage)	1	2:32	

== Glory 82 ==
Glory 82
- The poster for Glory 82
- Promotion: Glory
- Date: November 19, 2022
- Venue: Maritim Hotel
- City: Bonn, Germany

Glory 82 was a kickboxing event held by Glory on November 19, 2022, at the Maritim Hotel in Bonn, Germany.

=== Background ===
A heavyweight bout between former K-1 Heavyweight Champion Antonio Plazibat and former two-time K-1 World Grand Prix finalist and SUPERKOMBAT star Raul Cătinaș was booked as the main event. Cătinaș returned in 2021 after a 6-year hiatus.

The event was co-headlined by a vacant Glory Welterweight Championship bout between Alim Nabiev and Endy Semeleer, who were the second and third ranked divisional contenders respectively when the fight was announced.

=== Results ===
Glory 82
Weight Class				Method	Round	Time	Notes
Heavyweight 95+ kg	(Croatia) Antonio Plazibat	def.	(Romania) Raul Cătinaș	KO (Punches)	1	1:40	
Welterweight 77 kg	(Curaçao) Endy Semeleer	def.	(Azerbaijan) Alim Nabiev	Decision (Split)	5	3:00	For the vacant Glory Welterweight Championship
Welterweight 77 kg	(Brazil) Joilton Lutterbach	def.	(Netherlands) Mark Trijsburg	KO (Punches)	2	0:28	
Lightweight 71 kg	(Germany) Cihad Akipa	def.	(Israel) Itay Gershon	Decision (Split)	3	3:00	
Heavyweight 95+ kg	(Netherlands) Jahfarr Wilnis	def.	(Poland) Michał Bławdziewicz	Decision (Unanimous)	3	3:00	
Middleweight 85 kg	(Turkey) Serkan Ozcaglayan	def.	(Portugal) Juri de Sousa	TKO (Max Knockdowns)	3	2:19	
Prelims
Featherweight 65 kg	(Germany) Dennis Wosik	def.	(Netherlands) Mohamed El Mesbahi	Decision (Unanimous)	3	3:00	
Featherweight 65 kg	(Germany) Ahmad Chikh Mousa	def.	(Morocco) Mohamed El Hammouti	Decision (Unanimous)	3	3:00	

== Glory Rivals 4 ==
Glory Rivals 4
- Promotion: Glory; RISE; Shoot boxing
- Date: December 25, 2022
- Venue: Ryōgoku Kokugikan
- City: Tokyo, Japan

Glory Rivals 4 will be a kickboxing event held by Glory in partnership with RISE and Shoot boxing on December 25, 2022, at the Ryōgoku Kokugikan in Tokyo, Japan.

=== Background ===
The event was headlined by a featherweight bout between former RISE lightweight champion Kento Haraguchi and the former Glory featherweight champion Serhiy Adamchuk.

=== Fight Card ===
Glory Rivals 4
Weight				Method	Round	Time	Notes
Featherweight 65 kg	(Japan) Kento Haraguchi	def.	(Ukraine) Serhiy Adamchuk	Decision (Unanimous)	3	3:00	
Lightweight 70 kg	(Japan) Kaito	def.	(Bulgaria) Stoyan Koprivlenski	Decision (Split)	3	3:00	
Featherweight 65 kg	(Thailand) Petpanomrung Kiatmuu9	def.	(Japan) Kosei Yamada	Decision (Unanimous)	3	3:00	
Featherweight 65 kg	(Japan) Taiju Shiratori	def.	(Morocco) Ilias Banniss	Decision (Unanimous)	3	3:00	
Catchweight 63.5 kg	(Australia) Chadd Collins	def.	(Japan) Hiroki Kasahara	Decision (Unanimous)	3	3:00	
W.Strawweight 52 kg	(Netherlands) Tessa De Kom	def.	(Japan) Manazo Kobayashi	Decision (Unanimous)	3	3:00	
RISE World Series / SHOOTBOXING-Kings 2022
Catchweight 55 kg	(Japan) Shiro	def.	(Japan) Masahiko Suzuki	Decision (Majority)	3	3:00	
Catchweight 61 kg	(Japan) Yuki Kasahara	def.	(Japan) Yusaku Ishizuki	Decision (Unanimous)	3	3:00	
Catchweight 46 kg	(Japan) Koyuki Miyazaki	def.	(Japan) Misaki	Decision (Majority)	3	3:00	
Catchweight 55 kg	(Japan) Koki Osaki	def.	(Japan) Seiki Ueyama	Decision (Unanimous)	3	3:00	SHOOTBOXING Rules. Ueyama missed weight by 1.5 kg. He was deducted 2 points and had to wear bigger gloves.
Catchweight 57.5 kg	(Japan) Kyo Kawakami	def.	(Japan) Haruto Yasumoto	Ext.R Decision (Majority)	4	3:00	SHOOTBOXING Rules
Catchweight 57.5 kg	(Japan) Keisuke Monguchi	def.	(Japan) Kotaro Yamada	Decision (Unanimous)	3	3:00	SHOOTBOXING Rules
Light Heavyweight 95 kg	(Japan) Kenta Nanbara	def.	(Japan) Yuki Sakamoto	TKO (Doctor stoppage)	3	1:02	SHOOTBOXING Rules
Catchweight 53 kg	(Japan) Shuto Sato	def.	(Japan) Tsubasa Kaneko	TKO (3 Knockdowns)	1		SHOOTBOXING Rules
Catchweight 55 kg	(Japan) Koyata Yamada	def.	(Japan) Shoa Arii	KO (Right cross)	2	1:21	
Lightweight 70 kg	(Japan) YUYA	def.	(Japan) T-98	TKO (Punches)	2	1:12	
Catchweight 51.5 kg	(Japan) Ryujin Nasukawa	def.	(Japan) Koujiro	Decision (Majority)	3	3:00	
Preliminary card
Featherweight 65 kg	(Japan) Hyu	def.	(Japan) Hiroshi Noguchi	Decision (Unanimous)	3	3:00	
Catchweight 63 kg	(Japan) Ryuto Shiokawa	def.	(Japan) Soma Higashi	Decision (Unanimous)	3	3:00	
Catchweight 53 kg	(Japan) Takumi Hoshi	def.	(Japan) Naoki Kasahara	Decision (Unanimous)	3	3:00	SHOOTBOXING Rules

== See also ==
- 2022 in K-1
- 2022 in RISE
- 2022 in ONE Championship
- 2022 in Romanian kickboxing
- 2022 in Wu Lin Feng
