= Chico Kwasi =

Dutch kickboxer

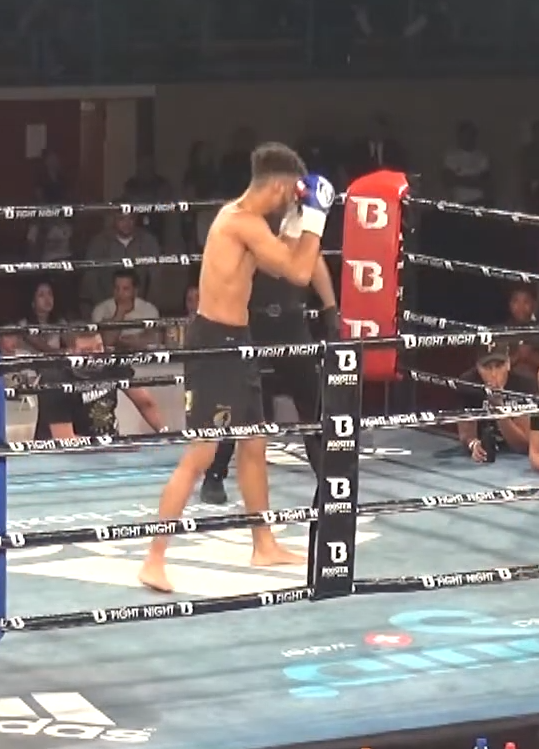
- Kwasi in 2017
- Born: Chico Fernando Samuel Kwasi; March 11, 1998 (age 28); Purmerend, Netherlands
- Other names: Luffy
- Nationality: Dutch; Surinamese
- Height: 191 cm (6 ft 3 in)
- Weight: 77 kg (170 lb; 12.1 st)
- Division: Welterweight; Middleweight
- Style: Kickboxing, boxing
- Stance: Orthodox
- Fighting out of: Oostzaan, Netherlands
- Team: Mike's Gym
- Trainer: Mike Passenier
- Years active: 2015–present

Professional boxing record
- Total: 9
- Wins: 5
- By knockout: 2
- Losses: 3
- By knockout: 1
- Draws: 1

Kickboxing record
- Total: 55
- Wins: 47
- By knockout: 23
- Losses: 6
- By knockout: 1
- Draws: 2

Other information
- Notable relatives: Fabio Kwasi (brother)
- Boxing record from BoxRec

Chico Fernando Samuel Kwasi (born March 11, 1998) is a Dutch-Surinamese professional kickboxer and former boxer, currently signed with Glory, where he is the current welterweight and middleweight champion. He previously competed for King of Kings and Dynamite Fighting Show. Kwasi is the former KOK welterweight champion.

As of October 2026, he is ranked as the best welterweight kickboxer and 1st pound for pound in the world by Beyond Kick.

== Professional kickboxing career ==
=== Early career ===
Kwasi faced Dorin Robert in the semi-finals of the 2015 "King of Kings in Vilnius" welterweight Grand Prix, on March 14, 2015. He won by unanimous decision and advanced to the finals of the one-day tournament, where he faced Martynas Jasiunas. Kwasi lost the fight by a second-round knockout.

Against Robin Ciric at North vs The Rest on March 25, 2017, Kwasi won by decision.

Kwasi faced Chris Bray for the Spartacus Fighting Championship K-1 -75 kg title at Spartacus Fighting Championship 5 – "Unbeatable Spirit" on June 4, 2017. He captured the title by a second-round technical knockout. Kwasi made his second appearance with the promotion against Sergei Aleksandrov at Spartacus Fighting Championship 6 – "Warrior Honour" on January 13, 2018. He won via a second-round knockout. These two victories on the Bulgarian kickboxing circuit earned him the chance to challenge Aleksandar Petrov for the Max Fight Middleweight (−82.5 kg) title at Max Fight 42 on May 3, 2018. He lost the fight by unanimous decision.

Kwasi faced Constantin Rusu in his FEA debut at FEA World Series 27 on December 8, 2018. He lost the fight by unanimous decision. After suffering two consecutive losses for the second time in his career, Kwasi was booked to face Maikel Astur at the February 16, 2019, The League event. He won the fight by unanimous decision. Kwasi won his next fight, against Denis Makowski at KOK World Series on March 2, 2019, by unanimous decision as well.

==== Dynamite Fighting Show ====
Kwasi made his promotional debut at DFS 5: Team Moroșanu vs. Team Bonjasky on September 27, 2019, against Daniel Pattvean. He won by unanimous decision.

==== Return to King of Kings ====
Kwasi returned to King of Kings to take part in the one-day KOK Welterweight tournament, which was held at KOK 82 on November 30, 2019. He captured the tournament title, as well as the IKBO K-1 Rules championship, with a third-round stoppage of Mohamed Wade in the semi-finals and a unanimous decision victory over Ekrem Doruk in the finals.

Kwasi faced Ismael Ayadi at Fight Covid on December 12, 2019. He won the fight by a second-round technical knockout. Kwasi faced Jay Overmeer at World Fight League on May 15, 2021, following a 17-month break from the sport of kickboxing. He lost the fight by unanimous decision. Kwasi next faced Volodymyr Hunzhu at KOK 92 on September 18, 2021. He won the fight by unanimous decision.

==== KOK belt ====
Kwasi faced Hendrik Themas for the interim KOK Welterweight Championship at KOK 94 on October 16, 2021. He won the five round contest by unanimous decision. Although Kwasi was initially expected to face the champion Constantin Rusu in a title unification bout, Rusu was stripped for inactivity before the fight could take place. As such, Kwasi instead faced Henrikas Viksraitis for the now vacant KOK Welterweight Championship at KOK 94 on October 16, 2021. He won the fight by unanimous decision.

Kwasi faced Miloš Daković at FFC 5 on December 19, 2021. He won the fight by unanimous decision. Kwasi next faced Sergej Braun at Super Cup Kickboxing 2 on April 30, 2022. He won the fight by unanimous decision.

Kwasi faced Vedat Hödük at KOK 107 - Mega Fight Arena on December 9, 2022, for the inaugural Mega Fight Arena Welterweight title in Istanbul, Turkey. He won the fight by extension round split decision.

=== GLORY ===
Kwasi made his Glory debut against fellow promotional newcomer Ștefan Orza at Glory 84 on March 11, 2023. He won the fight by a second-round knockout.

Kwasi faced the former Enfusion −80 kg champion Robin Ciric at Glory 86 on May 27, 2023. He won the fight by unanimous decision.

Kwasi faced the one-time GLORY welterweight title challenger Jay Overmeer at Glory: Collision 6 on November 4, 2023. He won the fight by split decision.

Kwasi challenged the Glory Welterweight champion Endy Semeleer at Glory 91 on April 27, 2024. He won the fight by a second-round technical knockout.

Kwasi made his first Glory Welterweight Championship defense against the Glory Lightweight champion Tyjani Beztati at Glory 96 on October 12, 2024. It was a close fought contest with Kwasi scoring a knockdown in the 2nd round and Beztati pushing the action in the 5th round. A closely fought contest the fight ended in a split decision draw. Beztati firmly claimed to have won the fight and both fighter where excited for a direct rematch. For unknown reasons this didn't happen.

Kwasi made his second Glory Welterweight Championship defense against the young Bulgarian Teodor Hristov at Glory 98 on February 22, 2025. Going into the fight Hristov was on a 15 fight win streak and undefeated in Glory. Chico Kwasi won the fight by unanimous decision.

Kwasi made his third Glory Welterweight Championship defense against the Glory Lightweight champion Tyjani Beztati at Glory Underground on May 1, 2025. Again Kwasi scored a knockdown in the 2nd round. He retained the title by another controversial split decision draw. There was a lot of negative reactions on Glory about the production of the fight and the size of the venue even some calling it the worst Glory event ever. Beztati claims to have won the fight again while Kwasi says he scored a knockdown in the 4th round. Following this fight Tyjani Beztati retires from kickboxing after frustration with the organization.

Kwasi made his fourth Glory Welterweight Championship defense against Mehdi Ait El Hadj at Glory 103. He retained the title via dominant unanimous decision. Chico also broke the Glory record of most Welterweight title defences after winning this fight.

Kwasi appeared in the Glory Collision 8 Welterweight tournament and was favored to win it. In a surprise upset, he lost in the rematch against Teodor Hristov via unanimous decision.

Following his tournament loss, Kwasi moved up in weight to challenge the longtime Glory Middleweight champion Donovan Wisse at Glory 107 on April 25, 2026. He won the fight via split decision after five rounds, capturing the middleweight title and becoming a simultaneous two-division champion.

Kwasi returned to Welterweight for his trilogy bout with Teodor Hristov at Glory 109, on September 5, 2026. In a bout that was disappointingly tepid, Kwasi won a unanimous decision over Hristov, with Hristov being unable to meaningfully crack Kwasi's defense for the whole fight.

== Professional boxing career ==
Kwasi made his professional boxing debut against Zacky Derouich on October 15, 2018, in the semi-finals of the 2018 Amsterdam Grand Prix. He won the fight by a third-round technical knockout. Later in the day, Kwasi was able to overcome Mohamed Elawil by majority decision to capture the tournament title.

Kwasi faced Nasser Bukenya on November 7, 2019, in the semi-finals of the 2019 Amsterdam Grand Prix. He won the fight by a closely contested split decision. He overcame Jan Julius Humme by a first-round technical knockout in the finals of the one-day tournament to capture his second Amsterdam Grand Prix super-middleweight title.

Kwasi faced Bekzad Nurdauletov for the vacant WBO Youth light heavyweight title on February 5, 2022. He lost the fight by a ninth-round technical knockout.

== Championships and accomplishments ==
- Glory
  - 2024 Glory Welterweight (-77 kg) Champion
    - Five successful title defenses
    - Most consecutive title defenses in Welterweight division history (4)
  - 2026 Glory Middleweight (-85 kg) Champion
- King of Kings
  - 2021 KOK Welterweight Championship
  - 2019 KOK Germany Welterweight Grand Prix winner
- Mega Fight Arena
  - 2022 MFA Welterweight Championship
- International Kyokushin Boxing Organization
  - 2019 IKBO K-1 Welterweight (−77 kg) Championship
- Spartacus Fighting Championship
  - 2017 SFC K-1 -75 kg Championship

== Kickboxing record ==
Professional kickboxing record
47 wins (23 (T)KOs), 6 losses, 2 draws
Date	Result	Opponent	Event	Location	Method	Round	Time
2026-12-12		(Morocco) Mohammed Hamdi	Glory Collision 10 - Welterweight Grand Prix, Quarterfinals	Arnhem, Netherlands			
2026-09-05	Win	(Bulgaria) Teodor Hristov	Glory 109	Rotterdam, Netherlands	Decision (unanimous)	5	3:00
Defends the Glory Welterweight Championship.
2026-04-25	Win	(Suriname) Donovan Wisse	Glory 107	Rotterdam, Netherlands	Decision (split)	5	3:00
Wins the Glory Middleweight Championship.
2025-12-13	Loss	(Bulgaria) Teodor Hristov	Glory Collision 8 - Welterweight Tournament, Semifinals	Arnhem, Netherlands	Decision (unanimous)	3	3:00
2025-08-23	Win	(Morocco) Mehdi Ait El Hadj	Glory 103	Rotterdam, Netherlands	Decision (unanimous)	5	3:00
Defends the Glory Welterweight Championship.
2025-05-01	Draw	(Morocco) Tyjani Beztati	Glory Underground	Miami, Florida, USA	Decision (split)	5	3:00
Defends the Glory Welterweight Championship.
2025-02-22	Win	(Bulgaria) Teodor Hristov	Glory 98	Rotterdam, Netherlands	Decision (unanimous)	5	3:00
Defends the Glory Welterweight Championship.
2024-10-12	Draw	(Morocco) Tyjani Beztati	Glory 96	Rotterdam, Netherlands	Decision (split)	5	3:00
Defends the Glory Welterweight Championship.
2024-04-27	Win	(Curaçao) Endy Semeleer	Glory 91	Paris, France	TKO (3 knockdowns)	2	2:07
Wins the Glory Welterweight Championship.
2023-11-04	Win	(Netherlands) Jay Overmeer	Glory: Collision 6	Arnhem, Netherlands	Decision (split)	3	3:00
2023-05-27	Win	(Netherlands) Robin Ciric	Glory 86	Essen, Germany	Decision (unanimous)	3	3:00
2023-03-11	Win	(Romania) Ștefan Orza	Glory 84	Rotterdam, Netherlands	TKO (knee)	2	3:00
2022-12-09	Win	(Turkey) Vedat Hödük	Mega Fight Arena Series 1	Istanbul, Turkey	Ext. R. decision (split)	4	3:00
Wins the Mega Fight Arena Welterweight (−77 kg) title.
2022-04-30	Win	(Germany) Sergej Braun	Super Cup Kickboxing 2	Erzhausen, Germany	Decision (unanimous)	3	3:00
2021-12-19	Win	(Serbia) Miloš Daković	FFC 5	Alanya, Turkey	Decision (unanimous)	3	3:00
2021-11-20	Win	(Lithuania) Henrikas Viksraitis	KOK 96 Mega Battle	Vilnius, Lithuania	Decision (unanimous)	5	3:00
Wins the vacant KOK Welterweight (−77 kg) title.
2021-10-16	Win	(Estonia) Hendrik Themas	KOK 94	Tallinn, Estonia	Decision (unanimous)	5	3:00
Wins the KOK Interim Welterweight (−77 kg) title.
2021-09-18	Win	(Ukraine) Volodymyr Hunzhu	KOK 92	Riga, Latvia	Ext. R. decision (unanimous)	3	3:00
2021-05-15	Loss	(Netherlands) Jay Overmeer	World Fight League	Netherlands	Decision (unanimous)	3	3:00
2020-12-12	Win	(Belgium) Ismael Ayaadi	Fight Covid	Brussels, Belgium	TKO (punches)	2	
2019-11-30	Win	(Germany) Ekrem Doruk	KOK 82, Tournament Final	Krefeld, Germany	Decision (unanimous)	3	3:00
Wins the IKBO K-1 Rules and KOK Germany Grand Prix Welterweight (−77 kg) titles.
2019-11-30	Win	(Germany) Mohamed Wade	KOK 82, Tournament Semi-final	Krefeld, Germany	TKO (3 knockdowns)	3	
2019-09-27	Win	(Romania) Daniel Pattvean	Dynamite Fighting Show 5	Piatra Neamț, Romania	Decision (unanimous)	3	3:00
2019-07-29	Win	(Turkey) Mükremin Güler	FFC 3	Antalya, Turkey	TKO (retirement)	1	3:00
2019-03-02	Win	(Poland) Denis Makowski	KOK World Series	Riga, Latvia	Decision (unanimous)	3	3:00
2019-02-16	Win	(Estonia) Maikel Astur	The League	Tallinn, Estonia	Decision (unanimous)	3	3:00
2018-12-08	Loss	(Moldova) Constantin Rusu	FEA World Series 27	Chișinău, Moldova	Decision (unanimous)	3	3:00
2018-06-10	Win	(Italy) Luca Migani	Dominet Event	Foggia, Italy	TKO (doctor stoppage)	2	
2018-05-03	Loss	(Bulgaria) Aleksandar Petrov	Max Fight 42	Sofia, Bulgaria	Decision (unanimous)	5	3:00
For the Max Fight −82.5 kg title.
2018-01-13	Win	(Bulgaria) Sergei Aleksandrov	Spartacus Fighting Championship 6 – "Warrior Honour"	Sofia, Bulgaria	KO (uppercut)	2	2:08
2017-11-18	Win	(Lithuania) Mantas Stankis	KOK World GP 2015 In Tallinn	Tallinn, Estonia	KO (knee)	3	3:00
2017-11-04	Win	(Suriname) Romano Bakboord	Fight Night II	Alphen aan den Rijn, Netherlands	TKO (knee)	3	3:00
2017-07-02	Win	(Italy) Francesco Palermo	Motorfighters 2	Foggia, Italy	Decision (unanimous)	3	3:00
2017-06-04	Win	(England) Chris Bray	Spartacus Fighting Championship 5 – "Unbeatable Spirit"	Sofia, Bulgaria	TKO (retirement)	2	3:00
Won the SFC K-1 (−75 kg) title.
2017-03-25	Win	(Netherlands) Robin Ciric	North vs The Rest	Leek, Netherlands	Decision	3	3:00
2016-11-27	Win	(Netherlands) Guillermo Blokland	Slamm: Almere's Finest	Almere, Netherlands	Decision (unanimous)	3	3:00
2016-10-08	Win	(Armenia) Armen Hovhannisyan	The Warriors 4	Norg, Netherlands	Decision	3	3:00
2016-05-28	Win	(United Kingdom) Ammari Diedrick	Ultimate Warriors 6	Nottingham, England	Decision (unanimous)	3	3:00
2016-02-28	Win	(Netherlands) Mark Trijsburg	Haarlem Fight Night	Haarlem, Netherlands	Decision	5	2:00
2015-11-14	Win	(Lithuania) Martynas Jasiunas	KOK Bushido's Hero	Vilnius, Lithuania	Decision (unanimous)	3	3:00
2015-10-17	Loss	(Latvia) Vyacheslav Tevinsh	KOK Hero's World Series 2015	Vilnius, Lithuania	Decision (split)	3	3:00
2015-03-14	Loss	(Lithuania) Martynas Jasiunas	KOK in Vilnius, Tournament Final	Vilnius, Lithuania	KO (spinning backfist)	2	1:44
For the KOK In Vilnius Welterweight (−77 kg) tournament title.
2015-03-14	Win	(Romania) Dorin Robert	KOK in Vilnius, Tournament Semi-final	Vilnius, Lithuania	Decision (unanimous)	3	3:00
Legend: Win Loss Draw/no contest Notes

== Professional boxing record ==
9 fights	5 wins	3 losses
By knockout	2	1
By decision	3	2
Draws	1	

No.	Result	Record	Opponent	Type	Round, time	Date	Location	Notes
9	Loss	5–3–1	Serhat Guler	MD	6	Oct 22, 2022	LEO's Boxgym, Munich, Germany	
8	Loss	5–2–1	Rostam Ibrahim	UD	8	Sep 10, 2022	Universum Gym, Hamburg, Germany	
7	Loss	5–1–1	Bekzad Nurdauletov	TKO (shoulder injury)	9 (10), 1:00	Feb 5, 2022	Rixos Water World Aktau, Aktau, Kazakhstan	For vacant WBO Youth light heavyweight title
6	Draw	5–0–1	Rostam Ibrahim	SD	8	Aug 21, 2021	Universum Gym, Hamburg, Germany	
5	Win	5–0	Tony Browne	UD	8	June 19, 2021	Claridge Events, Brussels, Belgium	
4	Win	4–0	Jan Julius Humme	TKO	1 (4)	Nov 7, 2019	Theater Carré, Amsterdam, Netherlands	Won Amsterdam Grand Prix super middleweight title
3	Win	3–0	Nasser Bukenya	SD	4	Nov 7, 2019	Theater Carré, Amsterdam, Netherlands	
2	Win	2–0	Mohamed Elawil	MD	4	Oct 15, 2018	Theater Carré, Amsterdam, Netherlands	Won Amsterdam Grand Prix super middleweight title
1	Win	1–0	Zacky Derouich	TKO	3 (4)	Oct 15, 2018	Theater Carré, Amsterdam, Netherlands	

== See also ==
- List of male kickboxers
