= Robin Ciric =

Dutch kickboxer

- Born: Robin Milan Ciric; 8 February 1997 (age 29); Drachten, Netherlands
- Other names: The King of the Ring
- Height: 182 cm (5 ft 11 1/2 in)
- Weight: 77 kg (170 lb; 12 st)
- Division: Welterweight
- Style: Kickboxing
- Fighting out of: Drachten, Netherlands
- Team: Mike's Gym
- Trainer: Mike Passenier

Kickboxing record
- Total: 34
- Wins: 23
- By knockout: 10
- Losses: 11
- By knockout: 2

Other information
- Website: https://robinciric.com

Robin Ciric (born 8 February 1997) is a Dutch kickboxer currently competing in the welterweight division. He is the former Enfusion 80 kg champion.

He first entered the Combat Press rankings in November 2021. He has been ranked as high as the eighth best welterweight in the world by Combat Press. He has not been ranked by Combat Press since December 2022, after his loss to Teodor Hristov.

== Kickboxing career ==
In December 2019, Ciric fought under the banner of the Fighters Glory promotion, where he faced the WMO champion Samih Mimouni. Ciric won the fight by a second-round knockout.

At Enfusion 83, Ciric fought Vladimír Moravčík for the Enfusion -80 kg title. He defeated Moravčík by a fourth-round TKO. Ciric fought three more non-title bouts in 2019, scoring knockouts of Mbamba Cauwenbergh, Giuseppe De Domenico and Samih Mimouni.

He was scheduled to fight Jeroen van Diemen on September 19 in a non-title fight and will defend his 80 kg title against Mohammed Ghaedibardeh in November 2020. Ghaedibardeh was unable to travel due to travel restrictions caused by the COVID-19 pandemic, and was replaced by Lofti Amri. He defeated Jeroen van Diemen by unanimous decision. His planned title defense was postponed because of restrictions related to the COVID-19 pandemic.

Ciric was scheduled for a welterweight bout against Florin Lambagiu on December 15, 2021, at Dynamite Fighting Show 13: Night of Champions. However, the fight was cancelled two weeks before taking place as Ciric tested positive for COVID-19.

Ciric faced Arbi Emiev at Fair Fight XVI on February 12, 2022. He won the fight by unanimous decision. Ciric was next booked to face Mohamed Touchassie for the vacant Enfusion Welterweight World Championship at Enfusion 109 on June 18, 2022. He lost the fight by decision.

Ciric was expected to face Endy Semeleer in the main event of Glory Rivals 2 on September 17, 2022. He withdrew from the fight in August 29, after testing positive for COVID-19.

Ciric faced Jay Overmeer at Glory Rivals 3 on November 5, 2022. He lost the fight by unanimous decision.

Ciric faced Jos Van Belzen at Glory 83 on February 11, 2023. He won the fight by unanimous decision.

Ciric faced Chico Kwasi at Glory 86 on May 27, 2023. He lost the fight by unanimous decision.

== Titles and accomplishments ==
Amateur

- 2015 IRO Dutch champion -79 kg
- 2015 IRO European champion -79 kg

Professional

- World Kickboxing Association
  - WKA K-1 World -83 kg Champion
- Enfusion
  - Enfusion World -80 kg Champion

== Professional kickboxing record ==
Professional kickboxing record
23 wins (10 (T)KOs), 11 losses
Date	Result	Opponent	Event	Location	Method	Round	Time
2026-05-09	Loss	(Morocco) Chahid Hammouti	8TKO #28	Heerenveen, Netherlands	Decision (unanimous)	3	3:00
2025-02-22	Loss	(Morocco) Mehdi Ait El Hadj	Glory 98	Rotterdam, Netherlands	Decision (split)	3	3:00
2024-10-12	Loss	(Bulgaria) Teodor Hristov	Glory 96	Rotterdam, Netherlands	Ext.R decision (unanimous)	4	3:00
2024-07-20	Win	(Serbia) Nikola Todorović	Glory 93	Rotterdam, Netherlands	Decision (unanimous)	3	3:00
2024-04-27	Win	(France) Diaguely Camara	Glory 91	Paris, France	Decision (unanimous)	3	3:00
2023-11-04	Loss	(Morocco) Ismail Ouzgni	Glory: Collision 6	Arnhem, Netherlands	Decision (unanimous)	3	3:00
2023-09-	Loss	(Morocco) Anwar Ouled-Chaib	House of Glory, Tournament Final	Netherlands	Decision (split)	3	3:00
Glory Welterweight title eliminator.
2023-08-	Win	(Netherlands) Figuereido Landman	House of Glory, Tournament Semifinals	Netherlands	Decision (unanimous)	3	3:00
2023-07-	Win	(Morocco) Soufian-Aoulad Abdelkhalek	House of Glory, Tournament Quarterfinals	Netherlands	Decision (unanimous)	3	3:00
2023-05-27	Loss	(Netherlands) Chico Kwasi	Glory 86	Essen, Germany	Decision (unanimous)	3	3:00
2023-02-11	Win	(Netherlands) Jos Van Belzen	Glory 83	Essen, Germany	Decision (split)	3	3:00
2022-11-05	Loss	(Netherlands) Jay Overmeer	Glory Rivals 3	Amsterdam, Netherlands	Decision (unanimous)	3	3:00
2022-06-18	Loss	(Morocco) Mohamed Touchassie	Enfusion 109	Groningen, Netherlands	Decision (unanimous)	5	3:00
For the vacant Enfusion Welterweight World Championship.
2022-02-12	Win	(Russia) Arbi Emiev	Fair Fight XVI	Yekaterinburg, Russia	Decision (unanimous)	3	3:00
2021-10-23	Win	(Morocco) Bilal Loukili	Enfusion 103	Groningen, Netherlands	Decision (split)	3	3:00
2020-09-19	Win	(Netherlands) Jeroen van Diemen	Enfusion 97	Alkmaar, Netherlands	Decision (unanimous)	3	3:00
2019-12-14	Win	(Morocco) Samih Mimouni	Fighters Glory	Drachten, Netherlands	KO	2	
2019-11-16	Win	(Italy) Giuseppe De Domenico	Enfusion 91	Groningen, Netherlands	KO (flying knee)	3	0:53
Wins the WKA K-1 World -83kg title.
2019-06-08	Win	(Belgium) Mbamba Cauwenbergh	Enfusion 85	Groningen, Netherlands	TKO	1	
2019-04-27	Win	(Slovakia) Vladimír Moravčík	Enfusion 83	Žilina, Slovakia	KO (punches)	4	0:35
Wins the Enfusion -80kg title.
2019-02-23	Win	(Belgium) Jente Nnamadim	Enfusion 79	Eindhoven, Netherlands	Ext.R decision	4	3:00
2018-12-07	Win	(Morocco) Taha Alami Marrouni	Enfusion 77	Abu Dhabi, United Arab Emirates	Ext.R decision	4	3:00
2018-11-17	Win	(Morocco) Soufyan Assa	Enfusion 74	Groningen, Netherlands	Decision	3	3:00
2018-09-20	Win	(Angola) Juri De Sousa	Enfusion 71	Hamburg, Germany	Ext.R decision	4	3:00
2018-06-23	Loss	(Morocco) Lotfi Serghini	Enfusion 69	Groningen, Netherlands	TKO (punches)	1	0:30
2018-05-12	Win	(Morocco) Mohamed El Moussaoui	Enfusion 67	The Hague, Netherlands	KO	2	
2018-03-09	Win	(Netherlands) Marino Schouten	Enfusion Talents 47	Abu Dhabi, United Arab Emirates	Decision	3	3:00
2017-11-18	Win	(Netherlands) Santino Verbeek	Enfusion 56	Groningen, Netherlands	Ext.R decision	4	3:00
2017-09-16	Loss	(Morocco) Khalid El Bakouri	Enfusion Talents 36	Groningen, Netherlands	KO	2	
2017-06-03	Win	(Netherlands) Ayoub Allach	Enfusion Talents 34	Groningen, Netherlands	Decision	3	3:00
2017-03-25	Loss	(Netherlands) Chico Kwasi	North vs The Rest	Leek, Netherlands	Decision	3	3:00
2017-02-04	Win	(Netherlands) Erwin vd Belt	Rumble Event	Beilen, Netherlands	Decision	3	3:00
Legend: Win Loss Draw/no contest Notes

== Personal life ==
Ciric is of Serbian descent.

== See also ==
- List of male kickboxers
