= Romea =

Romea may refer to:

- Romea (yacht)
- Alberto Romea, Spanish actor
- Justino Romea, Filipino composer, writer, director, musical arranger, poet and journalist
- Teatre Romea, a Barcelona theatre founded in 1863

== See also ==
- Romeas
- Romeo
