= Ahmed Krnjić =

Bosnian kickboxer and boxer (born 1997)

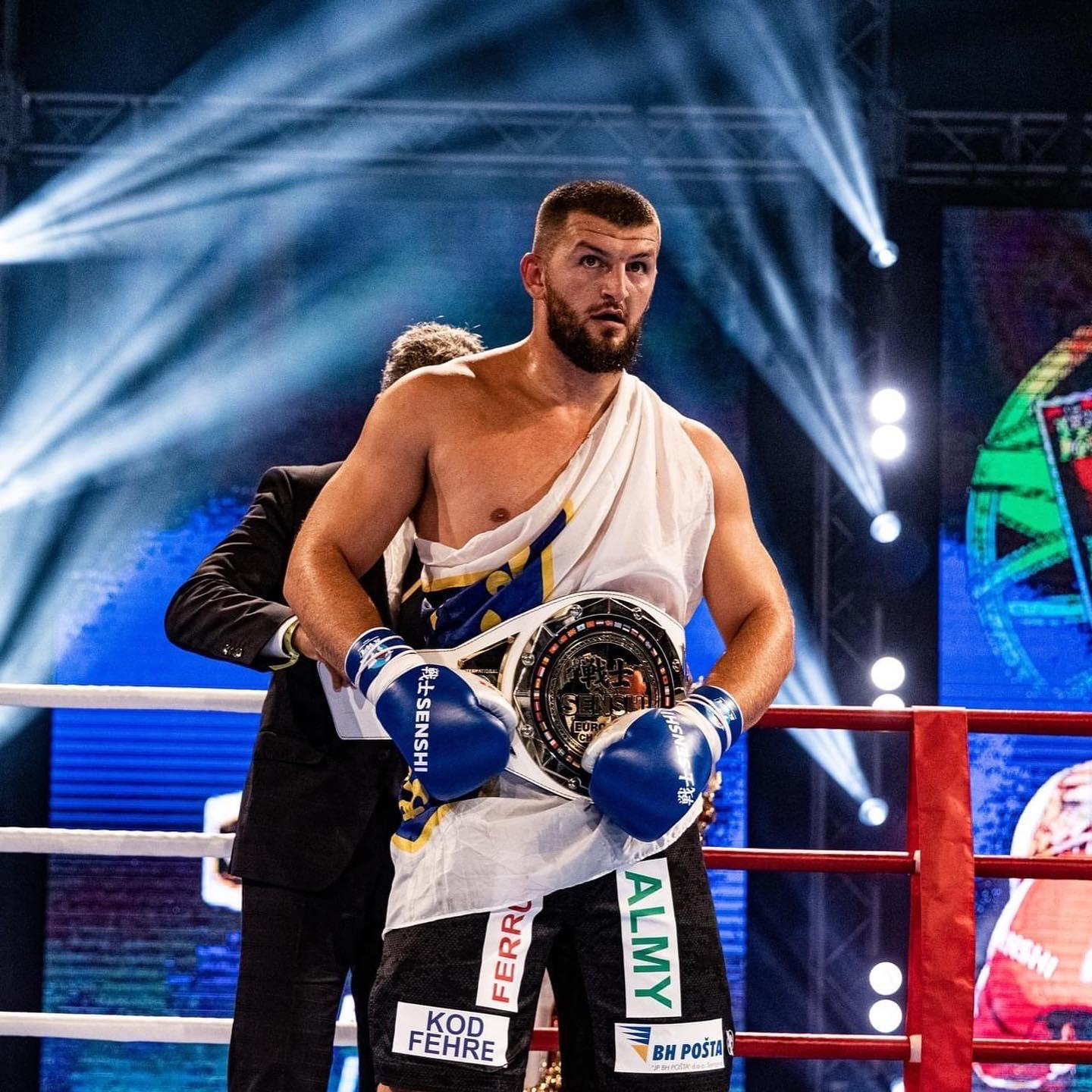
- Ahmed Krnjić at Senshi in 2023
- Born: February 14, 1997 (age 29); Kakanj, Bosnia and Herzegovina
- Other names: Bosnian Steel
- Height: 1.94 m (6 ft 4 in)
- Weight: 123.5 kg (272 lb; 19.45 st)
- Division: Heavyweight
- Reach: 200 cm (79 in)
- Style: Kickboxing, Boxing
- Fighting out of: Arnhem, Netherlands
- Team: Kickboxing Arnhem
- Trainer: Benjey Zimmerman
- Years active: 2013–present

Professional boxing record
- Total: 10
- Wins: 9
- By knockout: 6
- Losses: 1

Kickboxing record
- Total: 19
- Wins: 14
- By knockout: 4
- Losses: 4
- By knockout: 2
- No contests: 1

Other information
- Boxing record from BoxRec

Ahmed Krnjić (born February 14, 1997) is a Bosnian professional boxer and kickboxer. He has heid the World Boxing Council (WBC) International Silver heavyweight title since September 2026. In kickboxing, Krnjić competes in the heavyweight division of Glory.

== Kickboxing career ==
Ahmed Krnjić started training in kickboxing under the late Musa Selimović at Isak Gym in Zenica, Bosnia and Herzegovina. He became a 10 times Bosnian national kickboxing champion from 2013 to 2022. Parallel to his amateur kickboxing career, he competed in amateur boxing, being the national champion twice in 2013 and 2014.

He won silver medals at the 2015 WAKO European Junior Championships and 2014 WAKO World Junior Championships. At the senior level, he won silver medals at the 2017 WAKO World Championships and at the 2018 WAKO European Championships. His amateur kickboxing career record is 35–9, and his amateur boxing record is 12–2.

On April 20, 2019, Krnjić faced Deyan Topalski for the WAKO Pro K-1 European Heavyweight (88 kg) title. He won the fight by unanimous decision.

Krnjić faced Françesko Xhaja at Senshi 9 on July 10, 2021. He lost the fight by unanimous decision, after an extra round was contested.

On September 12, 2021, Krnjić faced Kadir Yildirim at KOK World Series in Turkey. He won the fight by unanimous decision.

On February 26, 2022, Krnjić faced Uku Jurjendal at Senshi 11 in Varna, Bulgaria. After the initial three rounds the fight was declared a draw and went to an extension round which Krnjić won by split decision.

Krnjić faced Bruno Chaves at ONE 163 in Singapore on November 19, 2022. He won the fight by unanimous decision.

On September 16, 2023, Krnjić faced Bruno Susano at SENSHI 18 for the vacant European heavyweight title. He won the fight by unanimous decision.

On February 24, 2024, Krnjić faced Florin Ivănoaie at Senshi 20. He won the fight by unanimous decision.

Krnjić signed with the Glory organization in 2024 and was scheduled to make his debut in 2025.

Krnjić was scheduled to face Alin Nechita in the Last Heavyweight Standing Tournament Opening Round as part of GLORY 99 on April 5, 2025. He lost the fight by unanimous decision.

== Professional boxing career ==
Krnjić won his first seven professional boxing fights before losing the WBC Grand Prix heavyweight tournament final to Kevin Cristopher Ramirez via unanimous decision in Riyadh, Saudi Arabia, on 20 December 2025.

In his ninth bout he defeated Ali Kiydin by fifth round technical knockout at Hala Pendik in Novi Pazar, Serbia, on 26 September 2026 to win the vacant WBC International Silver heavyweight title.

== Personal life ==
Ahmed Krnjić, who has trained in Germany and the Netherlands, is a devout Sunni Muslim and a father of two. He grew up in Varalići village in Kakanj, Bosnia and Herzegovina. He has a bachelor's degree in economics, concluding his studies at the Faculty of Economics, University of Zenica.

== Championships and accomplishments ==
=== Kickboxing ===
==== Professional ====
- World Association of Kickboxing Organizations
  - 2019 WAKO Pro K-1 European Heavyweight (-88.6 kg) champion
- SENSHI
  - 2023 SENSHI European Heavyweight (+95 kg) champion

==== Amateur ====
- World Association of Kickboxing Organizations
  - 2014 WAKO World Junior Championships K-1 (-91 kg) (silver)
  - 2015 WAKO European Junior Championships K-1 (-91 kg) (silver)
  - 2017 WAKO World Championships K-1 (-91 kg) (silver)
  - 2018 WAKO European Championships K-1 (-91 kg) (silver)

=== Boxing ===
==== Professional ====
- World Boxing Council (WBC) International Silver heavyweight title
- Riyadh Season WBC Boxing Grand Prix runner-up

==== Amateur ====
- 2013 and 2014 Bosnian national heavyweight champion

== Professional boxing record ==
10 fights	9 wins	1 loss
By knockout	6	0
By decision	3	1

No.	Result	Record	Opponent	Type	Round, time	Date	Location	Notes
10	Win	9–1	Ali Kiydin	TKO	5 (8), 1:18	26 Sep 2026	Hala Pendik, Novi Pazar, Serbia	Won vacant WBC International Silver Heavyweight title
9	Win	8–1	Bojan Cestic	TKO	2 (6), 0:32	23 May 2026	Oberhausen, Nordrhein-Westfalen, Germany	
8	Loss	7–1	Kevin Cristopher Ramirez	UD	8	20 Dec 2025	Riyadh, Saudi Arabia	WBC Grand Prix - Heavyweight - Final
7	Win	7–0	Keaton Gomes	SD	6	19 Oct 2025	Riyadh, Saudi Arabia	WBC Grand Prix - Heavyweight - Semifinals
6	Win	6–0	Tsotne Rogava	MD	6	13 Aug 2025	Kingdom Arena, Riyadh, Saudi Arabia	WBC Grand Prix - Heavyweight - Quarterfinals
5	Win	5–0	Davide Brito	TKO	5 (6), 2:59	21 Jun 2025	Cool Arena, Riyadh, Saudi Arabia	WBC Grand Prix - Heavyweight - Round of 16
4	Win	4–0	Yordy Valenzuela Santos	TKO	3 (6) 2:37	20 Apr 2025	Global Theater Boulevard Riyadh City, Riyadh, Saudi Arabia	WBC Grand Prix - Heavyweight - Round of 32
3	Win	3–0	Djordje Tomic	KO	1 (6) 2:42	21 Dec 2024	Sarajevo, Bosnia and Herzegovina	
2	Win	2–0	Drazan Janjanin	KO	1 (6) 1:25	6 Apr 2024	Aschaffenburg, Germany	
1	Win	1–0	Sinan Ozsahin	PTS	4	27 Jan 2024	Cologne, Germany	

== Kickboxing record ==
14 Wins (4 (T)KO's), 4 Losses, 1 No Contest
Date	Result	Opponent	Event	Location	Method	Round	Time
2025-04-05	Loss	(Romania) Alin Nechita	Glory 99 - Last Heavyweight Standing Opening Round	Rotterdam, Netherlands	Decision (Unanimous)	3	3:00
2024-04-20	Win	(Netherlands) Brian Douwes	SENSHI 21	Varna, Bulgaria	KO (High kick)	1	
2024-02-24	Win	(Romania) Florin Ivănoaie	SENSHI 20	Varna, Bulgaria	Decision (Unanimous)	3	3:00
2023-09-16	Win	(Portugal) Bruno Susano	SENSHI 18	Varna, Bulgaria	Decision (Unanimous)	3	3:00
Wins the vacant SENSHI European heavyweight (+95 kg) title
2022-11-19	Win	(Brazil) Bruno Chaves	ONE 163	Singapore	Decision (Unanimous)	3	3:00
2022-02-26	Win	(Estonia) Uku Jürjendal	SENSHI 11	Varna, Bulgaria	Ext.R Decision (Split)	4	3:00
2022-01-28	Win	(Azerbaijan) Foad Hashemi	KOK World Series	Istanbul, Turkey	KO (Kick to the body)	2	2:55
2021-12-04	Win	(Slovakia) Radovan Kulla	SENSHI 10	Varna, Bulgaria	Decision (Unanimous)	3	3:00
2021-10-01	Win	(North Macedonia) Milan Mitrevski	No Limit 9	Sarajevo, Bosnia and Herzegovina	KO (Punch to the body)	1	
2021-09-12	Win	(Turkey) Kadir Yildirim	Loca Fight 2	Istanbul, Turkey	Decision (Unanimous)	3	3:00
2021-07-10	Loss	(Albania) Françesco Xhaja	SENSHI 9	Kamchia, Bulgaria	Ext.R Decision (Unanimous)	4	3:00
2021-05-22	Win	(Morocco) Badr Ferdaous	SENSHI 8	Sofia, Bulgaria	Ext.R Decision (Unanimous)	4	3:00
2021-02-27	Win	(Russia) Vitalii Ishakhneli	SENSHI 7	Sofia, Bulgaria	Decision (Unanimous)	3	3:00
2020-12-18	Win	(Montenegro) Miroslav Vujović	Megdan 8	Sremska Mitrovica, Serbia	Decision	3	3:00
2020-02-16	NC	(Germany) Leon Gavanas	Steko's Fight Night	Munich, Germany	(low blow)		
2019-12-29	Win	(Montenegro) Aleksandar Danilović	Night of Champions	Cazin, Bosnia and Herzegovina	KO (Punch)	1	
2019-04-20	Win	(Bulgaria) Deyan Topalski	SENSHI 2	Sofia, Bulgaria	Decision (Unanimous)	5	3:00
Wins WAKO Pro European K-1 Heavyweight (-88.6 kg) title
2017	Loss	(Czech Republic) Cyril Pohl		Graz, Austria	KO (Knee to the body)	3	
2016-12-30	Loss	(Czech Republic) Daniel Škvor	Box Lucerna	Prague, Czech Republic	KO (Uppercut)	1	
Legend: Win Loss Draw/No contest Notes

Amateur kickboxing record
Date	Result	Opponent	Event	Location	Method	Round	Time
2025-11-27	Loss	(Ukraine) Ivan Tkachenko	2025 WAKO World Championship, Quarterfinals	Abu Dhabi, UAE	DQ (low kick)	2	
2025-11-26	Win	(India) Jaspreet Sing	2025 WAKO World Championship, First Round	Abu Dhabi, UAE	Decision (3:0)	3	2:00
2021-10-19	Loss	(Russia) Asadulla Nasipov	2021 WAKO World Championship, Quarterfinals	Jesolo, Italy	Decision (3:0)	3	2:00
2021-10-18	Win	(Mexico) Jose Gustavo Ruiz Esparza	2021 WAKO World Championship, First Round	Jesolo, Italy	Decision (3:0)	3	2:00
2018-10-16	Loss	(Croatia) Toni Čatipović	2018 WAKO European Championship, Final	Bratislava, Slovakia	Decision (2:1)	3	2:00
Wins the 2018 WAKO European Championship Heavyweight K-1 (-91 kg) Silver Medal.
2018-10-15	Win	(Ukraine) Roman Shcherbatiuk	2018 WAKO European Championship, Semifinals	Bratislava, Slovakia	Decision (2:1)	3	2:00
2018-10-13	Win	(Azerbaijan) Asaf Aslanov	2018 WAKO European Championship, Quarterfinal	Bratislava, Slovakia	TKO	2	2:00
2017-11-	Loss	(Ukraine) Roman Shcherbatiuk	2017 WAKO World Championship, Final	Budapest, Hungary	Decision (2:1)	3	2:00
Wins the 2017 WAKO World Championship K-1 Heavyweight (-91 kg) Silver Medal.
2017-11-	Win	(Poland) Mateusz Pluta	2017 WAKO World Championship, Semifinals	Budapest, Hungary	Decision (3:0)	3	2:00
2017-11-	Win	(Moldova) Pavel Voronin	2017 WAKO World Championship, Quarterfinals	Budapest, Hungary	Decision (3:0)	3	2:00
2016-10-	Loss	(Ukraine) Roman Shcherbatiuk	2016 WAKO European Championship, First Round	Maribor, Slovenia	Decision (3:0)	3	2:00
2015-08-	Loss	(Russia) Arslan Iallyev	2015 WAKO Junior European Championship, Final	San Sebastián, Spain	Decision (3:0)	3	2:00
Wins the 2015 WAKO Junior European Championship K-1 Heavyweight (-91 kg) Junior Silver Medal.
Legend: Win Loss Draw/No contest Notes

== See also ==
- List of male kickboxers
