= Asadulla Nasipov =

Russian professional kickboxer

- Born: Russia, 2001/2002
- Native name: Асадулла Насипов
- Nationality: Russian
- Height: 1.92 m (6 ft 3 1/2 in)
- Weight: 105 kg (231 lb; 16.5 st)
- Division: Heavyweight
- Style: Kickboxing
- Stance: Orthodox
- Fighting out of: Grozny, Russia
- Team: КК “Ахмат” (Ahmat Sports Club)
- Years active: 2017-2024 (Amateur career), 2024-Present (Professional career)

Kickboxing record
- Total: 6
- Wins: 3
- By knockout: 0
- Losses: 3
- By knockout: 1
- Draws: 0
- No contests: 0

Asadulla Nasipov is a Russian professional kickboxer, currently competing in the heavyweight division of GLORY. He was also recognized by the Russian Kickboxing Federation in 2021 for world championship achievements

== Championships and accomplishments ==
Amateur

- (gold) 2023 Russian K-1 +91 kg Championship
- (gold) 2021 WAKO World K-1 +91 kg Championship

== Kickboxing record ==
Kickboxing Record
3 wins (0 KOs), 3 losses (1 KOs)
Date	Result	Opponent	Event	Location	Method	Round	Time
2026-11-20	Win	(Iran) Iraj Azizpour	Army of Fighters 6	Istanbul, Turkey	Decision (split)	3	3:00
2025-10-11	Loss	(Netherlands) Levi Rigters	Glory 104 - Last Heavyweight Standing Qualification Round, Semifinals	Rotterdam, Netherlands	KO (Knee to the head)	3	0:46
2025-08-23	Win	(Italy) Yuri Farcaș	Glory 103 - Last Heavyweight Standing Opening Round Phase 2	Rotterdam, Netherlands	Decision (Unanimous)	3	3:00
2025-06-14	Loss	(Morocco) Anis Bouzid	Glory 100 - Day Two, Last Heavyweight Standing Qualification Round, Semifinals	Rotterdam, Netherlands	Ext.R Decision (Unanimous)	4	3:00
2025-04-05	Win	(Turkey) Murat Aygün	Glory 99 - Last Heavyweight Standing, Opening Round	Rotterdam, Netherlands	Decision (Unanimous)	3	3:00
2024-09-30	Win	(Russia) Ruslan Khaitov	Kubok Lotosa 2024	Russia	Ext.R Decision (Unanimous)	4	3:00
2024-04-13	Loss	(Russia) Basir Abakarov	Fair Fight 25	Russia	Decision (Unanimous)	3	3:00
Legend: Win Loss Draw/No contest Notes

=== Amateur record ===
Amateur Kickboxing Record
Date	Result	Opponent	Event	Location	Method	Round	Time
2023-12-5	Win	(Russia) Dmitry Vasenev	Russian Kickboxing Championship, K-1 Final +91 kg	Perm, Russia	Decision	3	2:00
2021-10	Win	(Croatia) Anto Siric	W.A.K.O World Championships 2021, K-1 Final +91 kg	Jesolo, Italy	Decision (3:0)	3	2:00
Wins W.A.K.O. World Championship '21 K-1 Gold Medal +91 kg.
2021-10	Win	(Ukraine) Roman Shcherbatiuk	W.A.K.O World Championships 2021, K-1 Semi Final +91 kg	Jesolo, Italy	Decision (3:0)	3	2:00
2021-10	Win	(Bosnia and Herzegovina) Ahmed Krnjić	W.A.K.O World Championships 2021, K-1 Quarter Final +91 kg	Jesolo, Italy	Decision (3:0)	3	2:00
2021-10	Win	(Israel) Yosef Tktok	W.A.K.O World Championships 2021, K-1 Round of 16 +91 kg	Jesolo, Italy	Decision (3:0)	3	2:00
2017-9	Loss	(Greece) Kopalas Efstathios	W.A.K.O Cadets and Juniors European Championship 2017, K-1 Semi Final -81 kg	Skopje, North Macedonia	Decision (2:1)	3	2:00
Legend: Win Loss Draw/No contest Notes

== See also ==
- List of male kickboxers
