= Miloš Cvjetićanin =

Serbian kickboxer

- Born: August 8, 1993 (age 33); Novi Sad, Serbia, Yugoslavia
- Native name: Милош Цвјетићанин
- Height: 1.89 m (6 ft 2 in)
- Weight: 99.3 kg (219 lb; 15.64 st)
- Style: Kickboxing
- Stance: Orthodox
- Fighting out of: Novi Sad, Serbia
- Team: KBK Vojvodina

Kickboxing record
- Total: 25
- Wins: 20
- By knockout: 10
- Losses: 5
- By knockout: 1
- Draws: 0
- No contests: 0

Miloš Cvjetićanin (born August 8, 1993) is a Serbian kickboxer. He is the K-1 World GP 2024 in Sarajevo winner. He currently competes in the Glory organization.

As of April 2026, he was the #3 ranked Heavyweight and #7 ranked Light Heavyweight Kickboxer in the world, according to Combat Press.

== Professional kickboxing career ==
=== Early career ===
Cvjetićanin was scheduled to face Bojan Džepina for the vacant WAKO Pro low kick Serbia titile on December 21, 2018, at the Zlatni Kikbokser event. He won the fight by unanimous decision.

On February 24, 2024, Cvjetićanin faced Enrico Pellegrino at SENSHI 20. He won the fight by second-round knockout with a high kick.

Cvjetićanin faced the 2018 K-1 Cruiserweight Grand Prix finalist Boubaker El Bakouri at SENSHI 21 on April 20, 2024. He won the fight by unanimous decision.

Cvjetićanin faced Muamer Jugović in the quarterfinals of the K-1 World GP 2024 in Sarajevo, held on June 29, 2024. He won the fight by a first-round technical knockout and advanced to the semifinals of the one-night tournament, where he faced Danilo Tosić. Tošić retired from the bout at the end of the opening round. Cvjetićanin captured the tournament title with a second-round stoppage of Nidal Bchiri in the finals.

=== Glory ===
Cvjetićanin signed with Glory on August 16, 2024. He made his promotional debut against Jimmy Livinus at Glory 95 on September 21, 2024. He won the fight by a first-round knockout.

Cvjetićanin faced Mory Kromah at Glory Collision 7 on December 7, 2024. He lost via unanimous decision.

Cvjetićanin moved up a category to take part in the Glory 99 “Heavyweight Last Man Standing Tournament” event where 32 heavyweight fighters competed on April 5, 2025 in Rotterdam, Netherlands. He faced Nabil Khachab in the Opening Round, winning via split decision.

Cvjetićanin faced Cem Caceres at Glory 100 in the Semifinals. He won via TKO due to a doctor stoppage. He then faced Nico Pereira Horta in the Finals, losing via split decision.

Cvjetićanin faced Colin George at Glory 103 in the Opening Round of Phase 2, winning via unanimous decision.

Cvjetićanin faced Alin Nechita in the semifinals of the Last Heavyweight Standing Qualification Round Phase 2 one-night tournament at Glory 104 - Last Heavyweight Standing Qualification Round on October 11, 2025. He won the fight by unanimous decision and advanced the to finals where he faced fellow countryman Rade Opačić. He won the fight by split decision.

Cvjetićanin next faced Cáceres in a rematch, in the semifinals of the Light Heavyweight Tournament at Glory Collision 8. He won via TKO in the first round, dropping and stopping Cáceres with a right hook. He then faced former two-time Middleweight title challenger Michael Boapeah in the Finals of the Tournament, losing via unanimous decision. This bout was controversial, as Boapeah seemed to land several low blows to Cvjetićanin, most of which went unpunished by the referee.

Cvjetićanin returned to Heavyweight to face Sofian Laidouni at Glory 105, in the Quarterfinals of the Last Heavyweight Standing Tournament. He won the bout via unanimous decision. dropping Laidouni several times, but injuring one of his toes in the process. He then faced Anis Bouzid in the semifinals, winning via majority decision, dropping Bouzid in the opening round. Unfortunately, the injuries he sustained across these two bouts meant the doctors could not clear him to compete in the Finals, in what would have been a rematch against Mory Kromah. Thus, Kromah was awarded the vacant Glory Heavyweight Championship via walkover.

Cvjetićanin would finally rematch Kromah in the main event of Glory Collision 9, four months later. He lost the bout via KO in the third round, getting dropped and stopped by a flying knee from Mory.

== Titles and accomplishments ==
=== Professional ===
- Glory
  - 2025 Glory Fighter of the Year
  - 2026 Glory Last Heavyweight Standing Finals Tournament runner-up
- K-1
  - K-1 World GP 2024 in Sarajevo Winner
- World Association of Kickboxing Organizations
  - 2018 WAKO Pro Low kick Serbia -88.6 kg Champion

=== Amateur ===
- World Association of Kickboxing Organizations
  - 2017 WAKO World Championships Low Kick -86 kg (gold)
  - 2018 WAKO European Championships Low Kick -86 kg (bronze)
  - 2019 WAKO Serbia Open European Kickboxing Cup K-1 -86 kg (gold)
  - 2019 WAKO Hungarian World Cup K-1 -86 kg (gold)
  - 2022 WAKO European Championships Low Kick -91 kg (bronze)
- Kickboxing Association of Serbia
  - 2014 Serbian National Championship B-Class Low Kick -86 kg (gold)
  - 2015 Serbian National Championship B-Class K-1 -86 kg (gold)
  - 2016 Serbian National Championship B-Class K-1 -91 kg (gold)
  - 2019 Serbian National Championship A-Class Low Kick -86 kg (silver)

== Fight record ==
Professional kickboxing record
20 wins (10 (T)KOs), 5 losses
Date	Result	Opponent	Event	Location	Method	Round	Time
2026-06-13	Loss	(Guinea) Mory Kromah	Glory Collision 9	Rotterdam, Netherlands	KO (flying knee)	3	1:56
For the Glory Heavyweight Championship.
2026-02-07	Win	(Morocco) Anis Bouzid	Glory 105 - Last Heavyweight Standing Finals Tournament, Semifinals	Arnhem, Netherlands	Decision (majority)	3	3:00
Cvjetićanin had to withdraw from the tournament due to injury.
2026-02-07	Win	(France) Sofian Laïdouni	Glory 105 - Last Heavyweight Standing Finals Tournament, Quarterfinals	Arnhem, Netherlands	Decision (unanimous)	3	3:00
2025-12-13	Loss	(Ghana) Michael Boapeah	Glory Collision 8 - Light Heavyweight Tournament, Final	Arnhem, Netherlands	Decision (unanimous)	3	3:00
2025-12-13	Win	(Turkey) Cem Cáceres	Glory Collision 8 - Light Heavyweight Tournament, Semifinals	Arnhem, Netherlands	TKO (right hook)	1	1:10
2025-10-11	Win	(Serbia) Rade Opačić	Glory 104 - Last Heavyweight Standing Qualification Round, Final	Rotterdam, Netherlands	Decision (split)	3	3:00
Qualifies for Glory Last Heavyweight Standing Finals Tournament.
2025-10-11	Win	(Romania) Alin Nechita	Glory 104 - Last Heavyweight Standing Qualification Round, Semifinals	Rotterdam, Netherlands	Decision (unanimous)	3	3:00
2025-08-23	Win	(Suriname) Colin George	Glory 103 - Last Heavyweight Standing Opening Round Phase 2	Rotterdam, Netherlands	Decision (unanimous)	3	3:00
2025-06-14	Loss	(Cape Verde) Nico Pereira Horta	Glory 100, Last Heavyweight Standing Qualification Round, Final	Rotterdam, Netherlands	Decision (split)	3	3:00
Fails to qualify for the 2025 Glory Last Heavyweight Standing - Final Tournament.
2025-06-14	Win	(Turkey) Cem Cáceres	Glory 100, Last Heavyweight Standing Qualification Round, Semifinals	Rotterdam, Netherlands	TKO (doctor stoppage)	1	2:01
2025-04-05	Win	(Morocco) Nabil Khachab	Glory 99 - Last Heavyweight Standing, Opening Round	Rotterdam, Netherlands	Decision (split)	3	3:00
2024-12-07	Loss	(Guinea) Mory Kromah	Glory Collision 7	Arnhem, Netherlands	Decision (unanimous)	3	3:00
2024-09-21	Win	(Netherlands) Jimmy Livinus	Glory 95	Zagreb, Croatia	KO (right hook)	1	2:29
2024-06-29	Win	(Morocco) Nidal Bchiri	K-1 World GP 2024 in Sarajevo, Tournament Final	Sarajevo, Bosnia and Herzegovina	TKO (low kicks)	2	2:03
Wins K-1 World GP 2024 in Sarajevo and qualifies for K-1 World Grand Prix 2024 Final.
2024-06-29	Win	(Bosnia and Herzegovina) Danilo Tosić	K-1 World GP 2024 in Sarajevo, Tournament Semi-final	Sarajevo, Bosnia and Herzegovina	TKO (retirement)	1	3:00
2024-06-29	Win	(Bosnia and Herzegovina) Muamer Jugović	K-1 World GP 2024 in Sarajevo, Tournament Reserve Fight	Sarajevo, Bosnia and Herzegovina	TKO (doctor stoppage)	1	1:20
2024-04-20	Win	(Morocco) Boubaker El Bakouri	SENSHI 21	Varna, Bulgaria	Decision (unanimous)	3	3:00
2024-02-24	Win	(Italy) Enrico Pellegrino	SENSHI 20	Varna, Bulgaria	KO (left high kick)	2	2:20
2023-11-25	Win	(Morocco) Abdelilah Azzouzi	SENSHI 19	Varna, Bulgaria	KO (right high kick)	3	0:15
2021-06-12	Win	(Hungary) Balázs Kiss	Superfight Series Hungary 7	Budapest, Hungary	TKO (retirement)	3	
2019-06-28	Loss	(Romania) Cosmin Ionescu	Colosseum Tournament 13	Călărași, Romania	Decision (split)	5	3:00
For the Colosseum Tournament World -86kg title.
2018-12-21	Win	(Serbia) Bojan Džepina	Zlatni Kikbokser	Smederevo, Serbia	Decision (unanimous)	4	3:00
Wins the vacant WAKO Pro Low kick Serbia -88.6kg title.
2018-09-05	Win	(Bosnia and Herzegovina) Mesud Selimović	Kick Boxing Profight Srbija Protiv Sveta	Surdulica, Serbia	Decision (unanimous)	3	3:00
Legend: Win Loss Draw/no contest Notes

Amateur kickboxing and Muay thai record
Date	Result	Opponent	Event	Location	Method	Round	Time
2022-11-	Loss	(Poland) Dominik Grzeda	2022 WAKO European Championships, Semifinal	Antalya, Turkey	Decision (split)	3	2:00
Wins 2022 WAKO European Championships Low Kick -91kg Bronze Medal.
2022-11-	Win	(Italy) Stiven Alla	2022 WAKO European Championships, Quarterfinal	Antalya, Turkey	Decision (split)	3	2:00
2021-09-18	Loss	(Hungary) Dávid Szabó-Tóth	WAKO 26th Hungarian Kickboxing World Cup 2021, Semifinal	Budapest, Hungary			
2021-09-17	Win	(Germany) Jakob Styben	WAKO 26th Hungarian Kickboxing World Cup 2021, Quarterfinal	Budapest, Hungary	Decision (3:0)	3	2:00
2019-07-26	Loss	(Ukraine) Anatolii Sukhanov	IFMA Senior World Championships 2019, Quarterfinal	Bangkok, Thailand	Decision	3	3:00
2019-07-24	Win	(Singapore) Vernon Jun Long Tan	IFMA Senior World Championships 2019, First Round	Bangkok, Thailand	TKO	2	
2019-05-19	Win	(Ukraine) Vladyslav Fostenko	WAKO 25th Hungarian Kickboxing World Cup 2019, Final	Budapest, Hungary	Decision (3:0)	3	2:00
Wins 2019 WAKO Hungarian Kickboxing World Cup K-1 -86kg Gold Medal.
2019-05-18	Win	(Slovenia) Saso Klinc	WAKO 25th Hungarian Kickboxing World Cup 2019, Semifinal	Budapest, Hungary	Decision (3:0)	3	2:00
2019-05-17	Win	(Russia) Sergey Ponomarev	WAKO 25th Hungarian Kickboxing World Cup 2019, Quarterfinal	Budapest, Hungary	Decision (3:0)	3	2:00
2019-05-16	Win	(Germany) Alexander Grunwald	WAKO 25th Hungarian Kickboxing World Cup 2019, First Round	Budapest, Hungary	Decision (3:0)	3	2:00
2019-05-05	Loss	(Serbia) Miloš Janković	2019 Serbian National Championship B-Class, Final	Belgrade, Serbia	Disqualification		
Wins 2019 Serbian National Championship A-Class Low Kick -86kg Silver Medal.
2019-05-05	Win	(Serbia) Srđan Aleksić	2019 Serbian National Championship A-Class, Semifinal	Belgrade, Serbia	Decision (unanimous)	3	2:00
2019-03-17	Win	(Bulgaria) Hristomir Ranchev	WAKO Serbia Open 2019, Final	Belgrade, Serbia	KO (jumping knee)	1	
Wins 2019 WAKO Serbia Open European Kickboxing Cup K-1 -86kg Gold Medal.
2019-03-17	Win	(Algeria) Khalef Ghezal	WAKO Serbia Open 2019, Semifinals	Belgrade, Serbia			
2018-11-	Loss	(North Macedonia) Dimitar Gjorgjiev	2018 WAKO European Championships, Semifinal	Bratislava, Slovakia	Decision (unanimous)	3	2:00
Wins 2018 WAKO European Championships Low Kick -86kg Bronze Medal.
2018-11-	Win	(Bosnia and Herzegovina) Mesud Selimović	2018 WAKO European Championships, Quarterfinal	Bratislava, Slovakia	Decision (unanimous)	3	2:00
2017-11-	Win	(Belarus) Miakhou Yauhen	2017 WAKO World Championships, Final	Budapest, Hungary	Decision (unanimous)	3	2:00
Wins 2017 WAKO World Championships Low Kick -86kg Gold Medal.
2017-11-	Win	(Russia) Tamerlan Aslanov	2017 WAKO World Championships, Semifinal	Budapest, Hungary	Decision (unanimous)	3	2:00
2017-11-	Win	(Azerbaijan) Orkhan Malikov	2017 WAKO World Championships, Quarterfinal	Budapest, Hungary	Decision (unanimous)	3	2:00
2017-11-	Win	(Portugal) Ricardo Fernandes	2017 WAKO World Championships, First Round	Budapest, Hungary	Decision (split)	3	2:00
2016-03-26	Win	(Serbia) Mitar Dugalić	2016 Serbian National Championship B-Class, Final	Belgrade, Serbia	Walkover	3	2:00
Wins 2016 Serbian National Championship B-Class K-1 -91kg Gold Medal.
2016-03-26	Win	(Serbia) Miloš Bajović	2016 Serbian National Championship B-Class, Semifinal	Belgrade, Serbia	Decision (unanimous)	3	2:00
2015-10-	Loss	(Latvia) Reinis Porozovs	2015 WAKO World Championships, Quarterfinal	Belgrade, Serbia	Decision (unanimous)	3	2:00
2015-10-	Win	(Bosnia and Herzegovina) Mahir Turko	2015 WAKO World Championships, First Round	Belgrade, Serbia	DQ		
2015-05-09	Win	(Serbia) Marko Novaković	2015 Serbian National Championship B-Class, Final	Belgrade, Serbia	KO	3	
Wins 2016 Serbian National Championship B-Class Low Kick -86kg Gold Medal.
2015-05-09	Win	(Serbia) Aleksandar Potić	2015 Serbian National Championship B-Class, Semifinal	Belgrade, Serbia	KO	3	
Legend: Win Loss Draw/no contest Notes
