= Alin Nechita =

Romanian kickboxer (born 2003)

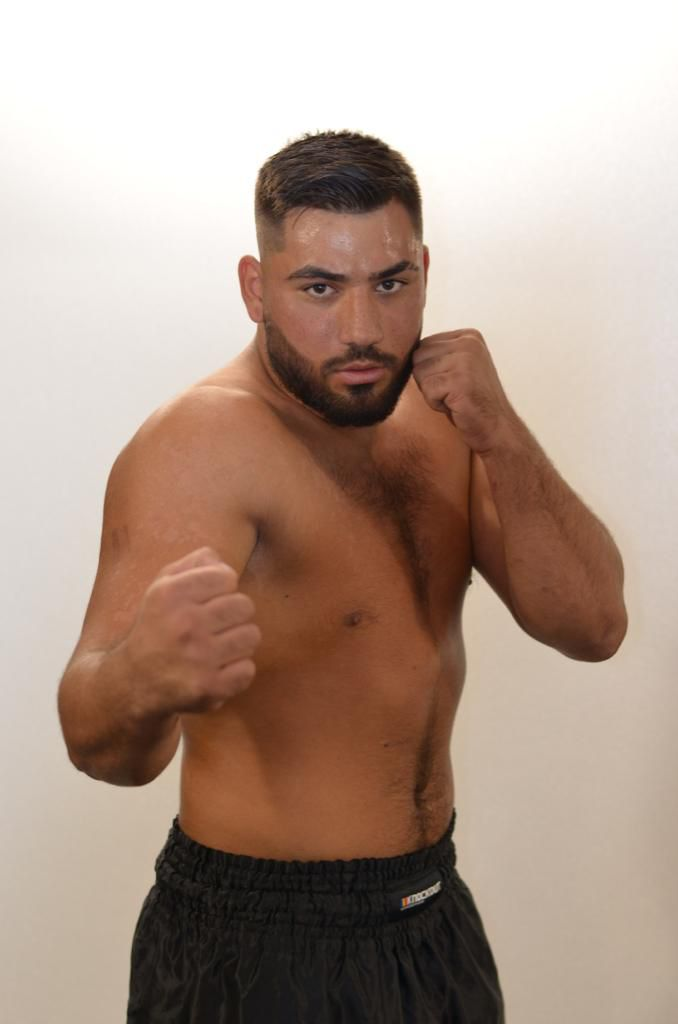
- Born: Alin Marian Nechita; July 23, 2003 (age 23); Iași, Romania
- Nickname: The Beast
- Height: 1.82 m (5 ft 11 1/2 in)
- Weight: 95 kg (209 lb; 14 st 13 lb)
- Division: Heavyweight (2023–present); Cruiserweight (2026–present)
- Stance: Orthodox
- Fighting out of: Iași, Romania
- Team: Tornado Fight Gym
- Trainer: Mihai Ifrim (head coach); Vlad Ifrim
- Years active: 2022–present

Kickboxing record
- Total: 26
- Wins: 21
- By knockout: 8
- Losses: 5
- By knockout: 0
- Draws: 0

Alin Marian Nechita (born July 23, 2003), sometimes spelled "Nekita" and nicknamed "The Beast", is a Romanian professional kickboxer who currently competes in the light heavyweight divsion of GLORY. He formerly competed in Colosseum Tournament where he was the Colosseum Tournament World Heavyweight Champion.

Upon signing with GLORY at just 21 years old to enter the "Last Heavyweight Standing" tournament, and subsequently making his promotional debut at Glory 99, Nechita was the youngest active heavyweight in the division.

== Kickboxing career ==
=== Early career ===
Alin Nechita began his professional kickboxing career in 2022. He compiled an early undefeated streak on the Romanian and regional scenes. Notable early victories included a split decision win over Ionuț Busuioc at KO Masters 10 in Bucharest on June 20, 2022, a first-round TKO against Alexandr Rojco at Legendele Moldovei in Iași on April 8, 2023 (improving to 10–0), and a unanimous decision over Jakub Doman at Kombat London 2 in London, England, on June 30, 2023.

He continued his rise with a third-round KO victory over Komeil Sharifi at Colosseum Tournament 40 in Baia Mare on October 20, 2023.

==== Colosseum Tournament World Heavyweight Champion ====
Nechita faced Marian Dunca for the vacant Colosseum Tournament World Heavyweight Championship belt on 8 December 2023, at Colosseum Tournament 41. He won the bout by unanimous decision.

==== Controversial loss to Sarara ====
His first professional loss came shortly afterward on January 13, 2024, at Strike King 1 in Wieliczka, Poland, where he dropped a split decision in an extra round to experienced Tomasz Sarara. In the third round, Nechita dropped Sarara with a powerful punch that appeared to be a knockout; the Polish fighter was heavily compromised and seemed unable to continue, but the referee’s delayed count and the sounding of the bell allowed him to recover. The judges scored the fight a draw after three rounds and ordered a fourth, after which Sarara was awarded a highly controversial split decision. The result was highly controversial and strongly contested in the press and among fans in both Romania and Poland, with many describing it as a “robbery” or “scandal” due to the refereeing of the knockdown and the decision to continue. This addition accurately reflects what was reported in contemporary Polish media (MMA.pl, InTheCage.pl, StrefaMMA, Sportowy Temat, etc.) and online reactions.

Nechita rebounded strongly. He scored a first-round TKO against Florin Matei at Asediul Tornadelor in Iași on April 13, 2024. He then defeated Winfried Jops by unanimous decision at Colosseum Tournament 44 in Brașov on September 27, 2024, followed by a unanimous decision win over Denis Viktorovih at International Legion Pro in Khmelnytskyi, Ukraine, on December 18, 2024.

=== GLORY ===
==== Last Heavyweight Standing ====
Nechita was announced as one of the 32 participants in the $1 million Last Heavyweight Standing.

Nechita was scheduled to face Ahmed Krnjić in the Last Heavyweight Standing Tournament Opening Round as part of GLORY 99 on April 5, 2025. Nechita won the fight by unanimous decision.

Nechita faced Mory Kromah in the Last Heavyweight Standing Tournament Qualification Round as part of Glory 100 on June 14, 2025, losing via unanimous decision. Kromah faced Bahram Rajabzadeh later that night in the 4-man 1-night pyramid final, winning via TKO in the first round.

Nechita returned at Glory 103, being brought back for the second Opening Round of the tournament. He faced Naim Hebbar, winning via unanimous decision.

Nechita faced Milos Cvjeticanin at Glory 104, on October 11, 2025. He lost the bout via unanimous decision, being dropped by a spinning wheel kick in the third round.

==== Drop to Light Heavyweight ====
Moving down in weight toward the light heavyweight division, he defeated veteran Luis Tavares by split decision at Glory 105 in Arnhem on February 7, 2026. He then dropped a split decision to Mohammed Hamdi at Glory 107 in Rotterdam on April 25, 2026.

Nechita returned to Romania for Colosseum Tournament 50 in Suceava on June 26, 2026, defeating Surat Garayev by unanimous decision in the main event.

He is scheduled to face Michael Boapeah in the co-main event of at Glory 110 in Antwerp on October 17, 2026.

== Kickboxing fighting style ==
Upon his Glory debut at just 21 years old, Nechita was compared by Glory heavyweight champion Rico Verhoeven and the website Beyond Kickboxing to Gökhan Saki. "The Home of Kickboxing" compared Nechita not only to a young Saki, but also to a young Mike Tyson. DAZN writer Timothy Wheaton said that Nechita "has potential as one of kickboxing’s future stars." Promotion matchmaker Robbie Timmers described him as "having extraordinary power for his height."

== Championships and accomplishments ==
- Colosseum Tournament
  - Colosseum Tournament World Heavyweight Championship (one time)
- Kickboxing Romania Awards
  - 2025 Kickboxer of the Year
  - 2024 Best Talent
  - 2023 Breakthrough Fighter of the Year

== Professional kickboxing record ==
Kickboxing record
21 wins (8 KOs), 5 losses (0 KOs), 0 draws
Date	Result	Opponent	Event	Location	Method	Round	Time	Record
2026-10-17	Loss	(Ghana) Michael Boapeah	Glory 110	Antwerp, Belgium	Decision (unanimous)	3	3:00	21-5-0
Glory Light Heavyweight Championship Eliminator.
2026-06-26	Win	(Azerbaijan) Surat Garayev	Colosseum Tournament 50: Romania vs Africa	Suceava, Romania	Decision (unanimous)	3	3:00	21-4-0
2026-04-25	Loss	(Morocco) Mohammed Hamdi	Glory 107	Rotterdam, Netherlands	Decision (split)	3	3:00	20-4-0
2026-02-07	Win	(Cape Verde) Luis Tavares	Glory 105	Arnhem, Netherlands	Decision (split)	3	3:00	20-3-0
2025-12-12	Win	(Croatia) Amir Suljović	Colosseum Tournament 48	Ploiești, Romania	KO (left hooks)	1	0:56	19-3-0
2025-10-11	Loss	(Serbia) Miloš Cvjetićanin	Glory 104 - Last Heavyweight Standing Qualification Round, Semifinals	Rotterdam, Netherlands	Decision (unanimous)	3	3:00	18-3-0
2025-08-23	Win	(France) Naim Hebbar	Glory 103 - Last Heavyweight Standing Opening Round Phase 2	Rotterdam, Netherlands	Decision (unanimous)	3	3:00	18-2-0
2025-06-14	Loss	(Guinea) Mory Kromah	Glory 100 Last Heavyweight Standing Qualification Round, Semifinals	Rotterdam, Netherlands	Decision (unanimous)	3	3:00	17-2-0
2025-04-05	Win	(Bosnia and Herzegovina) Ahmed Krnjić	Glory 99 Last Heavyweight Standing Opening Round	Rotterdam, Netherlands	Decision (unanimous)	3	3:00	17-1-0
2024-12-18	Win	(Ukraine) Denis Viktorovih	International Legion Pro	Khmelnytskyi, Ukraine	Decision (unanimous)	3	3:00	16-1-0
2024-09-27	Win	(Netherlands) Winfried Jops	Colosseum Tournament 44	Braşov, Romania	Decision (unanimous)	3	3:00	15-1-0
2024-04-13	Win	(Italy) Florin Matei	Asediul Tornadelor	Iași, Romania	TKO (three knockdowns)	1	1:50	14-1-0
2024-01-13	Loss	(Poland) Tomasz Sarara	Strike King 1	Wieliczka, Poland	Ext R. Decision	4	3:00	13-1-0
2023-12-08	Win	(Romania) Marian Dunca	Colosseum Tournament 41	Ploiești, Romania	Decision (unanimous)	5	3:00	13-0-0
Won the vacant Colosseum Tournament World Heavyweight Championship.
2023-10-20	Win	(Iran) Komeil Sharifi	Colosseum Tournament 40	Baia Mare, Romania	KO (punches)	3	0:18	12-0-0
2023-06-30	Win	(United Kingdom) Jakub Doman	Kombat London 2	London, England	Decision (unanimous)	3	3:00	11-0-0
2023-04-08	Win	(Moldova) Alexandr Rojco	Legendele Moldovei	Iaşi, Romania	TKO (towel thrown/punches)	1	0:28	10-0-0
2022-06-20	Win	(Romania) Ionuț Busuioc	KO Masters 10	Bucharest, Romania	Decision (split)	3	3:00	9-0-0
Legend: Win Loss Draw/no contest Notes

== See also ==
- List of male kickboxers
