= Rade Opačić =

Serbian kickboxer (born 1997)

- Born: Radomir Opačić; June 17, 1997 (age 29); Belgrade, Yugoslavia
- Nickname: The Second Round Killer
- Height: 2.00 m (6 ft 6 1/2 in)
- Weight: 112 kg (247 lb; 17 st 9 lb)
- Division: Heavyweight
- Reach: 79 in (201 cm)
- Style: Taekwondo, Kickboxing
- Stance: Orthodox
- Fighting out of: Belgrade, Serbia
- Team: Hemmers Gym (2025 - Present); Kikboks Klub Sindjelić (2014 - 2025)
- Trainer: Nikola Pavković

Kickboxing record
- Total: 33
- Wins: 25
- By knockout: 18
- Losses: 8
- By knockout: 3
- Draws: 0
- No contests: 0

Radomir Opačić (born June 17, 1997) is a Serbian kickboxer and former taekwondoist who competes in the Heavyweight division.

As of August 2024, he was ranked as the 7th best heavyweight in the world by Combat Press.

== Biography and career ==
=== Early career ===
Opačić is the son of Serbian refugees from Dalmatia. He was born and grew up in Zemun district, Belgrade. He started Taekwondo at 10 years old. At 14 years old his family moved to Hamilton, Ontario, Canada where he attended Glendale Secondary School and where he took up Kickboxing at a local Gym. Due to his size he was already facing adults at 15 years old in exhibition fights. When he moved back to Serbia he joined the KBKS Gym and competed as an amateur until the age of 18. He won several titles including the 2015 WAKO European Junior Championship.

On October 27, 2016, Opačić took part in his first major professional event when he engaged in the K-1 World GP 2016 –95 kg Championship Tournament in Belgrade. He won his quarterfinal by decision against Emmanuel Payet from France before losing by unanimous decision in the semifinals against Fabio Kwasi.

On March 24, 2018, Opačić faced Tomáš Hron at the Night of Warriors 2018 event. He was defeated by decision.

On February 24, 2019, Opačić took part in an 8-man one night tournament at the Kunlun Fight 80 event. He won his quarter finals against Liu Wei by body shot knockout in the first round before losing by second-round TKO to top ranked heavyweight Roman Kryklia in the semifinals where he was knocked down five times.

Opačić was scheduled in a 4-man Heavyweight Tournament at the Enfusion 86 Road to Abu Dhabi event on June 28, 2019. Opačić won both his semi final against Daniel Galabarov and the final against Nidal Bchiri by first-round knockouts. The tournament win qualified him for the year end Enfusion tournament in Abu Dhabi. On December 6, he was outpointed by Slovakia's Martin Pacas in his semifinal bout.

=== ONE Championship ===
Opačić was unable to fight in the first half of 2020 due to the COVID-19 pandemic. During this time it was announced he signed with the ONE Championship organization. On December 4, 2020, he faced veteran Errol Zimmerman for his promotional debut at ONE Championship: Big Bang 2 in Singapore. Opačić won the fight by spinning heel kick knockout in the second round.

Opačić was scheduled to face Bruno Susano at ONE Championship: Unbreakable on January 22, 2021. He won by second-round technical knockout.

Opačić was scheduled to face Patrick Schmid at ONE Championship: First Strike on October 15, 2021. Opačić defeated Schmid by second-round technical knockout.

On January 28, 2022, Opačić faced Françesco Xhaja at ONE: Only the Brave. He won by second-round knockout, earning him a Performance of the Night bonus and tied the record for most knockouts in ONE Super Series.

Opačić was booked to face the one-time WGP Kickboxing Super Heavyweight champion Guto Inocente at ONE 157 on May 20, 2022. The bout was later postponed, as Inocente tested positive for COVID-19, and was rescheduled for ONE 158 on June 3, 2022. He lost the bout via KO stoppage due to a liver punch in the first round.

Opačić faced Giannis Stoforidis in the ONE Heavyweight Kickboxing World Grand Prix alternate bout at ONE on Prime Video 2 on September 30, 2022. He won the fight by a second-round knockout.

Opačić faced Guto Inocente at ONE Fight Night 11 on June 11, 2023. He knocked Inocenete down once in the first round, with a right hook, en-route to winning the fight by unanimous decision.

Opačić faced Iraj Azizpour at ONE 165 on January 28, 2024. He won the fight by unanimous decision.

=== Europe ===
Opačić faced Daniel Lentie at SENSHI 22 on June 7, 2024. He won the fight by a second-round knockout.

Opačić faced Cristian Ristea at SENSHI 23 on September 7, 2024. He won the fight by unanimous decision.

=== Glory Kickboxing ===
After parted way with ONE Championship due to complaints of inactivity. On December 19, 2024, it was announced that Opačić signed with Glory.

He took part in the Glory 99 “Heavyweight Last Man Standing Tournament” where 32 heavyweight fighters competed on April 5, 2025 in Rotterdam, Netherlands. He lost by second round knockout to Nico Pereira Horta.

After this loss, Opačić switched gyms, choosing to train at Hemmer's Gym in The Netherlands. His first fight with Hemmer's was against Ionut Iancu at Glory 103. He won via TKO due to a leg injury in the third round.

Opačić faced Mike Kena in the semifinals of the Last Heavyweight Standing Qualification Round Phase 2 one-night tournament at Glory 104 - Last Heavyweight Standing Qualification Round on October 11, 2025. He won the fight by unanimous decision and advanced the to finals where he faced fellow countryman Miloš Cvjetićanin. He lost the fight by split decision.

== Personal life ==
He got married in Dalmatinska Lazarica Serbian Orthodox Church in Croatia on July 28, 2024.

== Titles and accomplishments ==
=== Professional ===
- ONE Championship
  - Performance of the Night (One time) vs. Françesco Xhaja
  - Most knockouts in ONE Super Series (5)
  - Most wins in the ONE Super Series Heavyweight Division (7)
- Enfusion
  - 2019 Enfusion 4-man Heavyweight Qualifying Tournament Winner

=== Amateur ===
- World Association of Kickboxing Organizations
  - 2015 WAKO European Junior Championships K-1 +91 kg (gold)
  - 2015 WAKO World Cup in Hungary K-1 +91 kg Winner
- K-1
  - 2015 K-1 Open World Amateur Championships in Italy Heavyweight Winner

== Fight record ==
Professional Kickboxing record
25 Wins (18 (T)KOs), 8 Losses, 0 Draw
Date	Result	Opponent	Event	Location	Method	Round	Time
2026-11-07	Win	(Russia) Alexander Soldatkin	FNC 35	Podgorica, Montenegro	DQ (multiple takedowns)	2	0:20
2026-04-25	Win	(Suriname) Colin George	Glory 107	Rotterdam, Netherlands	Decision (unanimous)	3	3:00
2025-10-11	Loss	(Serbia) Miloš Cvjetićanin	Glory 104 - Last Heavyweight Standing Qualification Round, Final	Rotterdam, Netherlands	Decision (split)	3	3:00
Fails to qualify for the 2025 Glory Last Heavyweight Standing - Final Tournament.
2025-10-11	Win	(Democratic Republic of the Congo) Mike Kena	Glory 104 - Last Heavyweight Standing Qualification Round, Semifinals	Rotterdam, Netherlands	Decision (inanimous)	3	3:00
2025-08-23	Win	(Romania) Ionuț Iancu	Glory 103 - Last Heavyweight Standing Opening Round Phase 2	Rotterdam, Netherlands	TKO (low kicks)	3	0:25
2025-04-05	Loss	(Cape Verde) Nico Pereira Horta	Glory 99 - Last Heavyweight Standing Opening Round	Rotterdam, Netherlands	KO (Right cross)	2	2:52
2024-09-07	Win	(Romania) Cristian Ristea	SENSHI 23	Varna, Bulgaria	Decision (Unanimous)	3	3:00
2024-07-06	Win	(Cameroon) Daniel Lentie	SENSHI 22	Varna, Bulgaria	KO (Punches)	2	1:18
2024-01-28	Win	(Iran) Iraj Azizpour	ONE 165	Tokyo, Japan	Decision (Unanimous)	3	3:00
2023-06-10	Win	(Brazil) Guto Inocente	ONE Fight Night 11	Bangkok, Thailand	Decision (Unanimous)	3	3:00
2022-10-01	Win	(Greece) Giannis Stoforidis	ONE on Prime Video 2	Kallang, Singapore	KO (Punches)	2	1:52
2022-05-20	Loss	(Brazil) Guto Inocente	ONE 158	Kallang, Singapore	KO (Body punch)	1	2:33
2022-01-28	Win	(Albania) Françesco Xhaja	ONE: Only the Brave	Kallang, Singapore	TKO (3 knockdown rule)	2	2:00
2021-10-15	Win	(Switzerland) Patrick Schmid	ONE Championship: First Strike	Kallang, Singapore	TKO (knees)	2	1:19
2021-01-22	Win	(Portugal) Bruno Susano	ONE Championship: Unbreakable	Kallang, Singapore	TKO (punches)	2	1:11
2020-12-04	Win	(Netherlands) Errol Zimmerman	ONE Championship: Big Bang 2	Kallang, Singapore	KO (spinning heel kick)	2	1:35
2019-12-06	Loss	(Slovakia) Martin Pacas	Enfusion 92, Heavyweight Tournament, Semifinals	Abu Dhabi, United Arab Emirates	Decision (unanimous)	3	3:00
2019-06-28	Win	(Morocco) Nidal Bchiri	Enfusion 86 Road to Abu Dhabi, Final	Belgrade, Serbia	KO (punches)	1	1:38
Qualified for the Enfusion Year End Heavyweight Tournament.
2019-06-28	Win	(Bulgaria) Daniel Galabarov	Enfusion 86 Road to Abu Dhabi, Semifinals	Belgrade, Serbia	KO (punches)	1	
2019-04-27	Loss	(Slovakia) Martin Pacas	Enfusion 83	Žilina, Slovakia	Decision (unanimous)	3	3:00
2019-02-24	Loss	(Ukraine) Roman Kryklia	Kunlun Fight 80 - Heavyweight Tournament, Semifinals	Shanghai, China	TKO (referee stoppage/5 knockdowns)	2	
2019-02-24	Win	(China) Liu Wei	Kunlun Fight 80 - Heavyweight Tournament, Quarterfinals	Shanghai, China	KO (body punch)	1	0:43
2018-12-01	Win	(Belgium) Mathieu Kongolo	Collision Fighting League 4	Lazarevac, Serbia	KO (left hook to the body)	1	0:40
2018-04-12	Win	(France) Pascal Touré	Collision Fighting League 2	Serbia	TKO (Punches)	3	2:55
2018-03-24	Loss	(Czech Republic) Tomáš Hron	Night of Warriors 2018	Liberec, Czech Republic	Decision	3	3:00
2017-09-30	Win	(Greece) Dimitris Vakakis	Collision Fighting League	Serbia	Decision	3	3:00
2017-04-29	Win	(Czech Republic) Ondřej Hutník	Simply the Best 14 Prague	Prague, Czech Republic	KO (high kick)	1	
2017-02-26	Win	(Hungary) Martin Sabo	Warrior Destiny	Weiz, Austria	KO	2	
2017-01-29	Win	(Romania) Ionuț Iancu	Road To W5	Novi Sad, Serbia	TKO (low kick)	2	
2016-10-27	Loss	(Netherlands) Fabio Kwasi	K-1 World GP 2016 -95kg Championship Tournament, Semi Finals	Belgrade, Serbia	Decision (unanimous)	3	3:00
2016-10-27	Win	(France) Emmanuel Payet	K-1 World GP 2016 -95kg Championship Tournament, Quarter Finals	Belgrade, Serbia	Decision (unanimous)	3	3:00
2016-10-08	Win	(Slovakia) Martin Sabo	Warriors Destiny		KO (head kick)	1	
2016-02-28	Win	(Serbia) Aleksandar Brkić	BPN Vol. XVII	Novi Sad, Serbia	KO (high kick)	3	

Amateur Kickboxing record
Date	Result	Opponent	Event	Location	Method	Round	Time
2015-08-29	Win	(Croatia) Hrvoje Ujević	2015 WAKO European Junior Championships, Final	San Sebastián, Spain	KO (Knee)		
Wins WAKO European Junior K-1 +91kg Gold Medal.

== See also ==
- List of male kickboxers
