= Michael Boapeah =

Ghanaian-Dutch kickboxer

- Born: Michael Baah-Boapeah; 21 April 2000 (age 26); The Hague, Netherlands
- Other names: Time Bomb
- Height: 185 cm (6 ft 1 in)
- Weight: 95 kg (209 lb; 15.0 st)
- Style: Kickboxing
- Stance: Orthodox
- Fighting out of: The Hague, Netherlands
- Team: ARJ Gym
- Trainer: Maikel Polanen
- Years active: 2018–present

Kickboxing record
- Total: 35
- Wins: 26
- By knockout: 9
- Losses: 8
- Draws: 1

Michael Boapeah (born January 1, 2000) is a Ghanaian-Dutch kickboxer, currently competing in the middleweight and Light Heavyweight divisions of Glory. He previously competed for Golden Fighter Championship and Colosseum Tournament. As of 1 June 2026, Boapeah is ranked the #10 Pound-For-Pound Kickboxer in the world by Beyond Kickboxing, as well as being ranked #2 and #3 in the Middleweight and Light Heavyweight divisions, respectively.

== Kickboxing career ==
=== Early career ===
Boapeah faced the two-time World Fighting League Middleweight champion Santino Verbeek at RINGS Nieuwegein on October 6, 2021. He won the fight by unanimous decision. This victory earned Boapeah the chance to challenge Kevin Van Heeckeren for the RINGS Middleweight (-85 kg) title at Rings Fighting Network 2022 on March 19, 2022. He lost the fight by unanimous decision.

Boapeah faced Amir Al Amir at Rings Gala Mijdrecht on June 4, 2022. The bout was a rematch of their March 24, 2019, meeting, which Boapeah won by unanimous decision. He was able to win the rematch by a first-round knockout.

=== Glory ===
Boapeah made his Glory debut against Florian Kröger at Glory 81: Ben Saddik vs. Adegbuyi 2 on August 20, 2022. He won the fight by unanimous decision. Despite calling for a fight with the top ranked Glory middleweight contender Serkan Ozcaglayan next, Boapeah was instead booked to face Glory debutante Sergej Braun at Glory: Collision 4 on October 8, 2022. Boapeah was knocked down in the third round, en route to losing the fight by majority decision.

Boapeah faced Ertugrul Bayrak at Glory 84 on March 11, 2023. He won the fight by unanimous decision.

Boapeah faced Ulric Bokeme at Glory: Collision 5 on June 17, 2023. He won the fight by a first-round technical knockout. Bokeme retired from the bout in the final minute of the opening round, after his front teeth were knocked out.

Boapeah faced Sergej Braun at Glory 87 on August 19, 2023. The bout was a rematch of their Glory 81 fight, which Braun won by unanimous decision. He won the fight by unanimous decision.

Boapeah was expected to challenge Donovan Wisse for the Glory Middleweight Championship at Glory 89 on October 7, 2023. Wisse withdrew from the bout, with an illness, on August 31. The title bout was rescheduled to take place at Glory: Collision 6 on November 4, 2023. He lost the fight by unanimous decision.

Boapeah faced Serkan Ozcaglayan at Glory 92 on May 18, 2024. He won the fight by unanimous decision.

Boapeah faced Ulric Bokeme at Glory 93 on July 20, 2024. He won the fight by unanimous decision.

Boapeah faced Mohamed Touchassie at Glory 96 on October 12, 2024. He won the fight by unanimous decision.

Boapeah faced Ștefan Lătescu at Glory Underground on May 1, 2025. He won the fight by a second-round technical knockout.

Boapeah challenged Glory Middleweight champion Donovan Wisse again at Glory 100 on June 14, 2025. He lost the fight by split decision.

Boapeah returned to the Light Heavyweight division at Glory Collision 8 for the Light Heavyweight Tournament. He faced Iuri Fernandes in the semifinals, winning a unanimous decision. He then faced Miloš Cvjetićanin in the Finals of the Tournament, winning both a unanimous decision, and the Tournament. This bout was controversial, as Boapeah seemingly landed several low blows to Cvjetićanin, most of which went unpunished.

Boapeah made his Heavyweight debut at Glory 105, stepping in to replace Antonio Plazibat in the Last Heavyweight Standing Finals Tournament, after Plazibat had to withdraw due to injury. He faced Mory Kromah, losing via unanimous decision.

Boapeah returned to Light Heavyweight at Glory Collision 9, entering the Light Heavyweight Grand Prix for the vacant Glory Light Heavyweight Championship. He faced former Glory Light Heavyweight Champion Artem Vakhitov in the Quarterfinals, winning via unanimous decision. He next faced former Glory Middleweight Champion Donovan Wisse in the semifinals, losing via unanimous decision.

Boapeah faced Alin Nechita at Glory 110 on October 17, 2026. He won the fight by unanimous decision.

== Title and accomplishments ==
- Glory
  - 2025 Glory Light Heavyweight 4-man Tournament Winner

== Kickboxing record ==
Kickboxing record
26 wins (9 (T)KOs), 8 losses, 1 draw, 0 no contests
Date	Result	Opponent	Event	Location	Method	Round	Time
2026-10-17	Win	(Romania) Alin Nechita	Glory 110	Antwerp, Belgium	Decision (unanimous)	3	3:00
Glory Light Heavyweight Championship Eliminator.
2026-06-13	Loss	(Suriname) Donovan Wisse	Glory Collision 9 - Light Heavyweight Grand Prix, Semifinals	Rotterdam, Netherlands	Decision (unanimous)	3	3:00
2026-06-13	Win	(Russia) Artem Vakhitov	Glory Collision 9 - Light Heavyweight Grand Prix, Quarterfinals	Rotterdam, Netherlands	Decision (unanimous)	3	3:00
2026-02-07	Loss	(Guinea) Mory Kromah	Glory 105 - Last Heavyweight Standing Finals Tournament, Quarterfinals	Arnhem, Netherlands	Decision (unanimous)	3	3:00
2025-12-13	Win	(Serbia) Miloš Cvjetićanin	Glory Collision 8 - Light Heavyweight Tournament, Final	Arnhem, Netherlands	Decision (unanimous)	3	3:00
Wins the 2025 Glory Light Heavyweight Tournament.
2025-12-13	Win	(Portugal) Iuri Fernandes	Glory Collision 8 - Light Heavyweight Tournament, Semifinals	Arnhem, Netherlands	Decision (unanimous)	3	3:00
2025-06-14	Loss	(Suriname) Donovan Wisse	Glory 100	Rotterdam, Netherlands	Decision (split)	5	3:00
For the Glory Middleweight Championship.
2025-05-01	Win	(Romania) Ștefan Lătescu	Glory Underground	Miami, Florida, USA	TKO (low kicks)	2	1:54
2025-02-22	Win	(Morocco) Ibrahim El Bouni	Glory 98	Rotterdam, Netherlands	TKO (4 knockdowns)	3	2:04
2024-10-12	Win	(Morocco) Mohamed Touchassie	Glory 96	Rotterdam, Netherlands	Decision (unanimous)	3	3:00
2024-07-20	Win	(Democratic Republic of the Congo) Ulric Bokeme	Glory 93	Rotterdam, Netherlands	Decision (unanimous)	3	3:00
2024-05-18	Win	(Turkey) Serkan Ozcaglayan	Glory 92	Rotterdam, Netherlands	Decision (unanimous)	3	3:00
2023-11-04	Loss	(Suriname) Donovan Wisse	Glory: Collision 6	Arnhem, Netherlands	Decision (unanimous)	5	3:00
For the Glory Middleweight Championship.
2023-08-19	Win	(Germany) Sergej Braun	Glory 87	Rotterdam, Netherlands	Decision (unanimous)	3	3:00
2023-06-17	Win	(Democratic Republic of the Congo) Ulric Bokeme	Glory: Collision 5	Rotterdam, Netherlands	TKO (retirement)	1	2:08
2023-03-11	Win	(Turkey) Ertugrul Bayrak	Glory 84	Rotterdam, Netherlands	Decision (unanimous)	3	3:00
2022-10-08	Loss	(Germany) Sergej Braun	Glory: Collision 4	Arnhem, Netherlands	Decision (majority)	3	3:00
2022-08-20	Win	(Germany) Florian Kröger	Glory 81: Ben Saddik vs. Adegbuyi 2	Düsseldorf, Germany	Decision (unanimous)	3	3:00
2022-06-04	Win	(Netherlands) Amir Al Amir	Rings Gala Mijdrecht	Mijdrecht, Netherlands	KO (uppercut)	1	
2022-03-19	Loss	(Netherlands) Kevin Van Heeckeren	Rings Fighting Network 2022	Nieuwegein, Netherlands	Decision (unanimous)	5	3:00
For the RINGS Middleweight (-85 kg) Championship.
2021-10-06	Win	(Netherlands) Santino Verbeek	RINGS Nieuwegein	Nieuwegein, Netherlands	Decision (unanimous)	3	3:00
2021-08-17	Win	(Romania) Claudiu Alexe	KO Masters 9	Bucharest, Romania	Decision (unanimous)	3	3:00
2021-06-24	Win	(Romania) Serkan Çelebi	GFC 7	Bucharest, Romania	TKO (cut)	2	2:32
2019-11-29	Win	(Romania) Robert Constantin	GFC 6	Timișoara, Romania	Decision (unanimous)	3	3:00
2019-10-06	Loss	(Netherlands) Jeroen Trijsburg	Rings Gala Amstelveen	Amstelveen, Netherlands	Decision (unanimous)	3	3:00
2019-05-09	Loss	(Romania) Adrian Mitu	Colosseum Tournament 12	Arad, Romania	Decision (unanimous)	3	3:00
2019-04-13	Win	(Netherlands) Hanno van der Wilt	Rings Gala Breukelen	Breukelen, Netherlands	Decision (unanimous)	3	2:00
2019-03-24	Win	(Netherlands) Amir Al Amir	Rings Gala Mijdrecht	Mijdrecht, Netherlands	Decision (unanimous)	3	2:00
Legend: Win Loss Draw/no contest Notes

== See also ==
- List of male kickboxers
