= Santino Verbeek =

Dutch kickboxer

- Born: 24 January 1995 (age 31); Hoorn, Netherlands
- Height: 184 cm (6 ft 1/2 in)
- Weight: 85 kg (187 lb; 13 st)
- Style: Kickboxing
- Fighting out of: Amsterdam, Netherlands
- Team: Sokudo Gym
- Trainer: Ernesto Hoost

Kickboxing record
- Total: 55
- Wins: 37
- Losses: 15
- Draws: 3

Santino Verbeek (born 24 January 1995) is a Dutch kickboxer currently competing in the Welterweight (83.9 kg) division.

He has competed in the Singapore-based ONE Championship and Netherlands-based World Fighting League promotions, where he is a former WFL 86 kg Champion.

== Titles and accomplishments ==
- 2019 World Fighting League −86 kg Champion
- 2018 World Fighting League −86 kg Champion

== Professional kickboxing record ==
Professional Kickboxing Record
Date	Result	Opponent	Event	Location	Method	Round	Time
2022-12-18	Loss	(Brazil) Vinicius Dinizio	HOOST CUP KINGS NAGOYA 12	Nagoya, Japan	Decision (Majority)	3	3:00
2022-03-22	Win	(Greece) Petros Vardakas	Kickboxing Fearless N°10	Wassenaar, Netherlands	Ext.R Decision	4	3:00
2021-10-06	Loss	(Netherlands) Michael Boapeah	RINGS Nieuwegein	Nieuwegein, Netherlands	Decision	3	3:00
2021-05-28	Loss	(Suriname) Miles Simson	ONE Championship: Full Blast	Kallang, Singapore	Decision (Unanimous)	3	3:00
2019-09-06	Win	(United Kingdom) Juan Cervantes	ONE Championship: Immortal Triumph	Ho Chi Minh City, Vietnam	Decision (Majority)	3	3:00
2019-02-17	Win	(Netherlands) Dennis Ipema	World Fighting League	Hoofddorp, Netherlands	Decision	5	3:00
Wins the WFL −86kg title.
2018-12-23	Win	(Brazil) Julio Mori	HOOST CUP KINGS NAGOYA 5	Nagoya, Japan	KO (Left Straight)	1	1:23
2018-10-21	Win	(Netherlands) Fernando Groenhart	World Fighting League, 86 kg Tournament Final	Hoofddorp, Netherlands	Decision	3	3:00
Wins the WFL −86kg title.
2018-10-21	Win	(Netherlands) Arno Van Der Lugt	World Fighting League, 86 kg Tournament Semi Final	Hoofddorp, Netherlands	Decision	3	3:00
2018-09-29	Loss	(Turkey) Serdar Yiğit Eroğlu		Malatya, Turkey	Decision	3	3:00
2018-07-07	Win	(Netherlands) Dennis Stolzenbach	Road2Victory / World Fighting League	Volendam, Netherlands	KO (Right High Kick)	2	2:15
2018-05-12	Loss	(Turkey) Samet Keser		Turkey	Decision	3	3:00
2018-04-15	Win	(Greece) Konstadelopoulos Stefanos	Spartan's Night I	Greece	Decision (Unanimous)	3	3:00
2018-03-25	Loss	(Netherlands) Dennis Ipema	World Fighting League	Almere, Netherlands	Decision	3	3:00
2018-02-17	Win	(Greece) Petros Vardakas	Road 2 Victory III by Sokudo Gym	Hoogwoud, Netherlands	Decision	3	3:00
2017-11-18	Loss	(Netherlands) Robin Ciric	Enfusion #56	Groningen, Netherlands	Extra Round Decision	4	3:00
2017-10-14	Draw	(Netherlands) Gilberto van Es	Road 2 Victory II	Volendam, Netherlands	Decision	3	3:00
2017-05-13	Draw	(Morocco) Badr Ferdous	Fight League 6	Nieuw-Vennep, Netherlands	Decision	3	3:00
2017-04-08	Win	(Greece) Petros Vardakas	Road 2 Victory Sokudo	Hoorn, Netherlands	Decision	3	3:00
2016-09-03	Win	(China) Liu Yuan	Wu Lin Feng 2016: Netherlands VS China	Zhengzhou, China	Decision (Unanimous)	3	3:00
2016-05-07	Win	(Belgium) Benjamin Masudi	No Limit Gym Fight Night	Belgium	Decision (Unanimous)	3	3:00
2016-03-19	Win	(Morocco) Mohammed el Boulahiati	Sokudo Fight Night	Hoogwoud, Netherlands	KO (Left Hook)	1	
2016-01-23	Loss	(Morocco) Bilal Boudal	Sportmani Events VIII	Amsterdam, Netherlands	Decision	3	3:00
2015-10-18	Win	(Netherlands) Justin Dap	World Fighting League	Hoofddorp, Netherlands	Decision	3	3:00
Legend: Win Loss Draw/No contest Notes
