= 2025 in Glory =

Kickboxing events

Information
- First date: February 22, 2025

The year 2025 is the 14th year in the history of Glory, an international kickboxing promotion.

The numbered Glory events are broadcast on various services such as DAZN, Viaplay, Go3 and Pro Arena. Glory Underground events are streamed for free on youtube.

== Glory 2025 Awards ==
The following fighters won the GLORY Kickboxing year-end awards for 2025:

- Glory Fighter of the Year 2025: Miloš Cvjetićanin
- Glory Fight of the Year 2025: Tarik Khbabez vs. Bahram Rajabzadeh (Glory 104)
- Glory Knockout of the Year 2025: Mory Kromah vs. Bahram Rajabzadeh (Glory 100)
- Glory Upset of the Year 2025: Nico Pereira Horta vs. Rade Opačić (Glory 99)
- Glory Comeback Fighter of the Year 2025: Antonio Plazibat
- Glory Breakout Fighter of the Year 2025: Anis Bouzid

== List of events ==
#	Event Title	Date	Arena	Location
1	Glory 98	February 22, 2025	RTM Stage	Rotterdam, Netherlands
2	Glory 99	April 5, 2025	Rotterdam Ahoy	Rotterdam, Netherlands
3	Glory Underground	May 1, 2025	Betr HQ	Miami, USA
4	Glory 100	June 14, 2025	Rotterdam Ahoy	Rotterdam, Netherlands
5	Glory 101	June 21, 2025	Yokohama Buntai	Yokohama, Japan
6	Glory 102	August 2, 2025	Ota City General Gymnasium	Tokyo, Japan
7	Glory 103	August 23, 2025	Rotterdam Ahoy	Rotterdam, Netherlands
8	Glory 104	October 11, 2025	RTM Stage	Rotterdam, Netherlands
9	Glory Collision 8	December 13, 2025	GelreDome	Arnhem, Netherlands

== Glory 98 ==
Glory 98
- Promotion: Glory
- Date: February 22, 2025
- Venue: RTM Stage
- City: Rotterdam, Netherlands
- Attendance: 7,800

Glory 98 is a kickboxing event held by Glory on February 22, 2025, in Rotterdam, Netherlands. Glory 98 was the last event to be broadcast on Videoland in the Netherlands.

=== Fight card ===
Glory 98
Weight Class				Method	Round	Time	Notes
Heavyweight +95 kg	(Morocco) Jamal Ben Saddik	def.	(Estonia) Uku Jürjendal	TKO (High kick)	3	2:59	
Welterweight 77 kg	(Netherlands) Chico Kwasi (c)	def.	(Bulgaria) Teodor Hristov	Decision (Unanimous)	5	3:00	For the Glory Welterweight Championship
Light Heavyweight 95 kg	(Turkey) Cem Cáceres	def.	(Guinea) Mory Kromah	Decision (Split)	3	3:00	
Light Heavyweight 95 kg	(Ghana) Michael Boapeah	def.	(Morocco) Ibrahim El Bouni	TKO (4 Knockdowns)	3	2:04	
Middleweight 85 kg	(Bosnia and Herzegovina) Mesud Selimović	def.	(Morocco) Iliass Hammouche	TKO (Spinning backfist)	2	1:23	
Welterweight 77 kg	(Morocco) Hamicha	def.	(Spain) Calmente Mendes	TKO (Low kicks)	3	0:37	
Featherweight 65 kg	(Portugal) Andre Santos	def.	(Germany) Chris Wunn	Decision (Unanimous)	3	3:00	
Prelims
Welterweight 77 kg	(Morocco) Mehdi Ait El Hadj	def.	(Netherlands) Robin Ciric	Decision (Split)	3	3:00	
Welterweight 77 kg	(Suriname) Don Sno	def.	(Morocco) Ismail Ayaadi	KO (Punches)	2	2:01	
Featherweight 65 kg	(Germany) Denis Wosik	def.	(France) Matthan Choinard	Decision (Unanimous)	3	3:00	
Welterweight 77 kg	(Croatia) Antonio Krajinović	def.	(Morocco) Soufian El Hammouchi	Decision (Unanimous)	3	3:00	

== Glory 99 ==
Glory 99
- Promotion: Glory
- Date: April 5, 2025
- Venue: Rotterdam Ahoy
- City: Rotterdam, Netherlands
- Attendance: 11,500

Glory 99 is a kickboxing event held by Glory on April 5, 2025, in Rotterdam, Netherlands.

=== Background ===
The event will serve as the opening round of the 2025 Heavyweight Last Man Standing Tournament where 32 heavyweight fighters face each other.

=== Fight card ===
Glory 99 (DAZN)
Weight Class				Method	Round	Time	Notes
Heavyweight +95 kg	(Morocco) Jamal Ben Saddik	def.	(Romania) Cristian Ristea	Decision (unanimous)	3	3:00	Last Heavyweight Standing Opening Round
Heavyweight +95 kg	(Azerbaijan) Bahram Rajabzadeh	def.	(Netherlands) Brian Douwes	TKO (3 knockdowns)	1	2:41	Last Heavyweight Standing Opening Round
Heavyweight +95 kg	(Nigeria) Tariq Osaro	def.	(Romania) Benjamin Adegbuyi	TKO (punches)	1	1:59	Last Heavyweight Standing Opening Round
Heavyweight +95 kg	(Cape Verde) Nico Pereira Horta	def.	(Serbia) Rade Opačić	KO (right cross)	2	2:52	Last Heavyweight Standing Opening Round
Heavyweight +95 kg	(Serbia) Miloš Cvjetićanin	def.	(Morocco) Nabil Khachab	Decision (split)	3	3:00	Last Heavyweight Standing Opening Round
Heavyweight +95 kg	(France) Sofian Laidouni	def.	(Ukraine) Oleg Pryimachov	TKO (3 Knockdowns)	1	1:47	Last Heavyweight Standing Opening Round
Heavyweight +95 kg	(Russia) Asadulla Nasipov	def.	(Turkey) Murat Aygün	Decision (unanimous)	3	3:00	Last Heavyweight Standing Opening Round
Heavyweight +95 kg	(Guinea) Mory Kromah	def.	(France) Nicolas Wamba	TKO (injury)	2	1:37	Last Heavyweight Standing Opening Round
Heavyweight +95 kg	(Slovakia) Tomáš Možný	def.	(Iran) Sina Karimian	Decision (unanimous)	3	3:00	Last Heavyweight Standing Opening Round
Heavyweight +95 kg	(Romania) Alin Nechita	def.	(Bosnia and Herzegovina) Ahmed Krnjić	Decision (unanimous)	3	3:00	Last Heavyweight Standing Opening Round
Heavyweight +95 kg	(Romania) Ionuț Iancu	def.	(Turkey) Cihad Kepenek	TKO (retirement)	1	3:00	Last Heavyweight Standing Opening Round
Prelims
Heavyweight +95 kg	(Iran) Iraj Azizpour	def.	(Italy) Yuri Farcaș	KO (spinning backfist)	2	1:17	Last Heavyweight Standing Opening Round
Heavyweight +95 kg	(Albania) Asdren Gashi	def.	(Morocco) Nidal Bchiri	Decision (split)	3	3:00	Last Heavyweight Standing Opening Round
Heavyweight +95 kg	(Suriname) Colin George	def.	(Montenegro) Miroslav Vujović	TKO (injury/retirement)	1	1:35	Last Heavyweight Standing Opening Round
Heavyweight +95 kg	(Morocco) Anis Bouzid	def.	(United Kingdom) Nathan Cook	TKO (punches)	1	0:28	Last Heavyweight Standing Opening Round
Heavyweight +95 kg	(Albania) Luigj Gashi	def.	(Belarus) Petr Romankevich	Decision (unanimous)	3	3:00	Last Heavyweight Standing Opening Round

== Glory Underground ==
Glory Underground
- Promotion: Glory
- Date: May 1, 2025
- Venue: Betr Headquarters
- City: (United States) Miami, USA
- Attendance: 100

Glory Underground is a kickboxing event held by Glory on May 1, 2025, in Miami, USA.

=== Background ===
Glory Underground was a private, invite only, special event limited to 100 spectators and streamed live on Youtube. The event featured Welterweight champion Chico Kwasi in a rematch against Lightweight champion Tyjani Beztati for the Welterweight title.

The event took place at Jake Paul's betting company, Betr.

=== Fight card ===
Glory Underground (YouTube)
Weight Class				Method	Round	Time	Notes
Welterweight 77 kg	(Suriname) Chico Kwasi (c)	vs.	(Morocco) Tyjani Beztati	Draw (Split)	5	3:00	For the Glory Welterweight Championship.
Light Heavyweight 95 kg	(Ghana) Michael Boapeah	def.	(Romania) Ștefan Lătescu	TKO (Low kicks)	2	1:54	
Welterweight 77 kg	(Suriname) Don Sno	def.	(Morocco) Younes Smaili	Decision (Split)	3	3:00	
Welterweight 77 kg	(Serbia) Andrija Stankovic	def.	(United States) Gary Mack	Decision (Unanimous)	3	3:00	
Heavyweight +95 kg	(United States) Delvin Nichols	def.	(United States) Demitri Lyman	Decision (Unanimous)	3	3:00	

== Glory 100 ==
Glory 100
- Promotion: Glory
- Date: June 14, 2025
- Venue: Rotterdam Ahoy
- City: Rotterdam, Netherlands
- Attendance: 13,000

Glory 100 is a kickboxing event held by Glory on June 14, 2025 in Rotterdam, Netherlands.

=== Background ===
The card was initially planned as a two day event but was later changed to a single event. Glory 100 will feature bouts in the Qualification Round for the 2025 Glory Last Heavyweight Standing tournament. Tarik Khbabez defends his Light Heavyweight title against former Light Heavyweight champion Sergej Maslobojev, Petpanomrung Kiatmuu9 defends his Featherweight title against Miguel Trindade, Donovan Wisse defends his title in a rematch against Michael Boapeah. Rico Verhoeven defends his Heavyweight title against former Light Heavyweight champion Artem Vakhitov in the main event.

=== Fight card ===
Glory 100 (DAZN)
Weight Class				Method	Round	Time	Notes
Heavyweight +95 kg	(Netherlands) Rico Verhoeven (c)	def.	(Russia) Artem Vakhitov	Decision (unanimous)	5	3:00	For the Glory Heavyweight Championship.
Light Heavyweight 95 kg	(Morocco) Tarik Khbabez (c)	vs.	(Lithuania) Sergej Maslobojev	No Contest (overturned)	4	2:06	For the Glory Light Heavyweight Championship. Originally a TKO win for Maslobojev; overturned after he tested positive for a metabolite of stanozolol.
Heavyweight +95 kg	(Guinea) Mory Kromah	def.	(Azerbaijan) Bahram Rajabzadeh	KO (flying knee)	1	2:14	Last Heavyweight Standing Qualification Round, Group 3 Final
Middleweight 85 kg	(Suriname) Donovan Wisse (c)	def.	(Ghana) Michael Boapeah	Decision (split)	5	3:00	For the Glory Middleweight Championship.
Featherweight 65 kg	(Thailand) Petpanomrung Kiatmuu9 (c)	def.	(Portugal) Miguel Trindade	Decision (unanimous)	5	3:00	For the Glory Featherweight Championship.
Heavyweight +95 kg	(Nigeria) Tariq Osaro	def.	(France) Sofian Laidouni	KO (left hook)	2	0:33	Last Heavyweight Standing Qualification Round, Group 4 Final
Heavyweight +95 kg	(Cape Verde) Nico Pereira Horta	def.	(Serbia) Miloš Cvjetićanin	Decision (split)	3	3:00	Last Heavyweight Standing Qualification Round, Group 2 Final
Heavyweight +95 kg	(Morocco) Anis Bouzid	def.	(Iran) Iraj Azizpour	Decision (unanimous)	3	3:00	Last Heavyweight Standing Qualification Round, Group 1 Final
Heavyweight +95 kg	(France) Sofian Laidouni	def.	(Morocco) Jamal Ben Saddik	TKO (doctor stoppage)	1	1:36	Last Heavyweight Standing Qualification Round, Group 4 Semifinals
Heavyweight +95 kg	(Nigeria) Tariq Osaro	def.	(Albania) Luigj Gashi	TKO (retirement)	1	2:10	Last Heavyweight Standing Qualification Round, Group 4 Semifinals
Heavyweight +95 kg	(Azerbaijan) Bahram Rajabzadeh	def.	(Albania) Asdren Gashi	KO (left hook)	1	0:53	Last Heavyweight Standing Qualification Round, Group 3 Semifinals
Heavyweight +95 kg	(Guinea) Mory Kromah	def.	(Romania) Alin Nechita	Decision (unanimous)	3	3:00	Last Heavyweight Standing Qualification Round, Group 3 Semifinals
Superfights
Catchweight 88 kg	(Morocco) Mohamed Touchassie	def.	(Turkey) Serkan Ozcaglayan	Decision (unanimous)	3	3:00	
Featherweight 65 kg	(Albania) Berjan Peposhi	def.	(Turkey) Deniz Demirkapu	Decision (unanimous)	3	3:00	
Heavyweight +95 kg	(Serbia) Miloš Cvjetićanin	def.	(Turkey) Cem Cáceres	TKO (doctor stoppage)	1	2:01	Last Heavyweight Standing Qualification Round, Group 2 Semifinals
Heavyweight +95 kg	(Cape Verde) Nico Pereira Horta	def.	(Suriname) Colin George	Decision (unanimous)	3	3:00	Last Heavyweight Standing Qualification Round, Group 2 Semifinals
Heavyweight +95 kg	(Morocco) Anis Bouzid	def.	(Russia) Asadulla Nasipov	Ext.R Decision (unanimous)	4	3:00	Last Heavyweight Standing Qualification Round, Group 1 Semifinals
Heavyweight +95 kg	(Iran) Iraj Azizpour	def.	(Romania) Ionuț Iancu	Decision (split)	3	3:00	Last Heavyweight Standing Qualification Round, Group 1 Semifinals
Heavyweight +95 kg	(Portugal) Iuri Fernandes	def.	(Italy) Samuele Pugliese	TKO (doctor stoppage)	2	2:43	Last Heavyweight Standing Qualification Round, Reserve fight

== Glory 101 ==
Glory 101
- Promotion: RISE; Glory
- Date: June 21, 2025
- Venue: Yokohama Buntai
- City: Yokohama, Japan
- Attendance: 4,200

Glory 101 or RISE World Series Yokohama 2025 is a kickboxing event held by RISE and Glory on June 21, 2025 in Yokohama, Japan.

=== Background ===
The event will feature four bouts part of the Opening Round of the 2025 Glory and RISE co-promoted Last Featherweight Standing tournament. The tournament will feature two brackets, one of 12 Glory fighters and one of 12 RISE fighters.

=== Fight card ===
Glory 101 (DAZN)
Weight Class				Method	Round	Time	Notes
51.5 kg	(Japan) Ryujin Nasukawa	def.	(Morocco) Hamada Azmani	Decision (Unanimous)	3	3:00	For the inaugural ISKA K-1 World Strawweight title
61.5 kg	(Japan) Kan Nakamura	def.	(Japan) Yuki Kasahara	KO (High kick)	4	1:49	2025 RISE 61.5kg World Series Semifinals
61.5 kg	(China) Yuan Pengjie	def.	(Japan) Hyuma Hitachi	Decision (Unanimous)	3	3:00	2025 RISE 61.5kg World Series Semifinals
Featherweight 65 kg	(Japan) Hiroki Kasahara	def.	(Thailand) Lompetch Beastgym	Decision (Unanimous)	3	3:00	RISE GLORY Last Featherweight Standing Opening Round
Featherweight 65 kg	(Romania) Petru Morari	def.	(Japan) Sumiya Ito	Decision (Split)	3	3:00	RISE GLORY Last Featherweight Standing Opening Round
Featherweight 65 kg	(Spain) Aitor Currito	def.	(Morocco) Ayoub Bourass	Decision (Unanimous)	3	3:00	RISE GLORY Last Featherweight Standing Opening Round
Featherweight 65 kg	(France) Bobo Sacko	def.	(Netherlands) Jan Kaffa	Decision (Unanimous)	3	3:00	RISE GLORY Last Featherweight Standing Opening Round
54 kg	(Japan) Ryu Hanaoka	def.	(Malaysia) Muhammad Mikail Ghazali	Decision (Unanimous)	3	3:00	
57 kg	(Japan) Masahiko Suzuki	def.	(Japan) Daiki Toita	Decision (Unanimous)	3	3:00	
63 kg	(Japan) Tomohiro Kitai	def.	(Japan) Yuki	Decision (Unanimous)	3	3:00	
61.5 kg	(Japan) GUMP	def.	(Japan) Ryo Takahashi	Decision (Unanimous)	3	3:00	
55 kg	(Japan) Ryoya Ito	def.	(Japan) Musashi Matsushita	Decision (Majority)	3	3:00	
67.5 kg	(Japan) Chappy Yoshinuma	def.	(Japan) Takamasa Abiko	TKO (Punches)	3	0:24	
55 kg	(Japan) Yugo Kato	def.	(Japan) Reiji	KO (Left hook)	2	1:27	
Preliminary Card
67.5 kg	(Japan) Ruka	def.	(Japan) Hiroki Zaitsu	KO	2		
51.5 kg	(Japan) Yumeto Mizuno	def.	(Japan) Aron	Decision (Unanimous)	3	3:00	
53 kg	(Japan) Kodai Ono	def.	(Japan) Koki	Decision (Unanimous)	3	3:00	

== Glory 102 ==
Glory 102
- Promotion: RISE; Glory
- Date: August 2, 2025
- Venue: Ota City General Gymnasium
- City: Tokyo, Japan
- Attendance: 3,500

Glory 102 or RISE World Series 2025 Tokyo was a kickboxing event held by RISE and Glory in Tokyo, Japan on August 2, 2025.

=== Background ===
A RISE Bantamweight World title bout between champion Shiro and challenger Masashi Kumura was booked as the main event, while a RISE Super Lightweight (-65kg) World title bout between champion Chadd Collins and challenger Kento Haraguchi served as the co-main event.

=== Fight card ===
Glory 102
Weight Class				Method	Round	Time	Notes
55 kg	(Japan) Shiro (c)	def.	(Japan) Masashi Kumura	Decision (unanimous)	5	3:00	For the RISE Bantamweight World title
Featherweight 65 kg	(Australia) Chadd Collins (c)	def.	(Japan) Kento Haraguchi	Decision (split)	5	3:00	For the RISE Super Lightweight World title
53 kg	(Japan) Ryujin Nasukawa	def.	(Japan) Jin Mandokoro	Decision (unanimous)	3	3:00	
Featherweight 65 kg	(Japan) Taiju Shiratori	def.	(United Kingdom) Andy Turland	KO (kick)	1	1:53	
Featherweight 65 kg	(Germany) Denis Wosik	def.	(Thailand) Suarek Teppen Gym	Decision (unanimous)	3	3:00	RISE GLORY Last Featherweight Standing Opening Round
Featherweight 65 kg	(Japan) Yutaro Asahi	def.	(Romania) Eduardo Cătălin	KO (head kick)	3	2:28	RISE GLORY Last Featherweight Standing Opening Round
Featherweight 65 kg	(Italy) Achraf Aasila	def.	(Algeria) Lounis Saing	Decision (unanimous)	3	3:00	RISE GLORY Last Featherweight Standing Opening Round
Featherweight 65 kg	(Japan) YURA	def.	(China) Kong Dexiang	TKO (punches)	1	1:33	RISE GLORY Last Featherweight Standing Opening Round
RISE
55 kg	(Japan) Rasta	def.	(Thailand) Auto OneLink	KO (left cross)	1	2:32	
60 kg	(Japan) Rantaro	def.	(Japan) Seido	Decision (unanimous)	3	3:00	
54 kg	(Japan) Ryu Hanaoka	def.	(Japan) Momu Tsukamoto	TKO (punches)	2	2:53	Open finger gloves match
53.5 kg	(Japan) Kazuki Osaki	def.	(Thailand) Lanyakaew Tor.Silapon	TKO (body punches)	3	2:46	Open finger gloves match
Preliminary Card
51 kg	(Japan) Yun Toshima	draw.	(Japan) Hotaru	Decision (split)	3	3:00	
63 kg	(Japan) Kazuteru Yamazaki	def.	(Japan) Yudai Arai	KO (body kick)	3	1:40	
55 kg	(Japan) Renji Inoue	def.	(Japan) Masaki Senba	TKO (corner stoppage)	3	3:52	

== Glory 103 ==
Glory 103
- Promotion: Glory
- Date: August 23, 2025
- Venue: Rotterdam Ahoy
- City: Rotterdam, Netherlands
- Attendance: 7,200

Glory 103 - Last Heavyweight Standing Opening Round Phase 2 is a kickboxing event held by Glory on August 23, 2025.

=== Background ===
The event will feature the Opening Round of Phase Two of Glory Last Heavyweight Standing tournament. The Second Phase will feature a total of 16 Heavyweight fighters, consisting of the dropouts of Phase One and new fighters.

=== Fight card ===
Glory 103 (DAZN)
Weight Class				Method	Round	Time	Notes
Heavyweight +95 kg	(Netherlands) Levi Rigters	def.	(Morocco) Jamal Ben Saddik	KO (spinning back kick)	3	1:41	Last Heavyweight Standing Opening Round
Welterweight 77 kg	(Netherlands) Chico Kwasi (c)	def.	(Morocco) Mehdi Ait El Hadj	Decision (unanimous)	5	3:00	For the Glory Welterweight Championship.
Heavyweight +95 kg	(Guinea) Mory Kromah	def.	(Romania) Cristian Ristea	TKO (nose injury)	2	2:16	
Heavyweight +95 kg	(Serbia) Rade Opačić	def.	(Romania) Ionuț Iancu	TKO (leg injury)	3	0:25	Last Heavyweight Standing Opening Round
Heavyweight +95 kg	(Morocco) Nabil Khachab	def.	(United Kingdom) Nathan Cook	Decision (unanimous)	3	3:00	Last Heavyweight Standing Opening Round
Heavyweight +95 kg	(Serbia) Miloš Cvjetićanin	def.	(Suriname) Colin George	Decision (unanimous)	3	3:00	Last Heavyweight Standing Opening Round
Welterweight 77 kg	(Suriname) Don Sno	def.	(Turkey) Tayfun Özcan	Decision (split)	3	3:00	
Prelims
Heavyweight +95 kg	(France) Sofian Laidouni	def.	(Turkey) Cihad Kepenek	Decision (unanimous)	3	3:00	Last Heavyweight Standing Opening Round
Heavyweight +95 kg	(Russia) Asadulla Nasipov	def.	(Romania) Yuri Farcaș	Decision (unanimous)	3	3:00	Last Heavyweight Standing Opening Round
Heavyweight +95 kg	(Romania) Alin Nechita	def.	(Algeria) Naim Hebbar	Decision (unanimous)	3	3:00	Last Heavyweight Standing Opening Round
Heavyweight +95 kg	(Democratic Republic of the Congo) Mike Kena	def.	(Netherlands) Errol Koning	Decision (split)	3	3:00	Last Heavyweight Standing Opening Round

== Glory 104 ==
Glory 104
- Promotion: Glory
- Date: October 11, 2025
- Venue: RTM Stage
- City: Rotterdam, Netherlands
- Attendance: 7,800

Glory 104 or Glory Last Heavyweight Standing Phase Two - Qualification Round is a kickboxing event held by Glory on October 11, 2025.

=== Background ===
Glory Last Heavyweight Standing will feature the Qualification Round of Phase Two for the 2025 Glory Last Heavyweight Standing tournament. 8 fighters fight for a spot in the Final Round through 4-man tournaments.

=== Fight card ===
Glory 104 (DAZN)
Weight Class				Method	Round	Time	Notes
Light Heavyweight 95 kg	(Morocco) Tarik Khbabez	def.	(Azerbaijan) Bahram Rajabzadeh	Decision (majority)	5	3:00	For the Glory Light Heavyweight Championship.
Heavyweight +95 kg	(Serbia) Miloš Cvjetićanin	def.	(Serbia) Rade Opačić	Decision (split)	3	3:00	Last Heavyweight Standing Qualification Round Phase 2, Group 2 Final
Heavyweight +95 kg	(France) Sofian Laidouni	def.	(Netherlands) Levi Rigters	Decision (unanimous)	3	3:00	Last Heavyweight Standing Qualification Round Phase 2, Group 1 Final
Middleweight 85 kg	(Germany) Sergej Braun	def.	(Morocco) Iliass Hammouche	Disqualification	2	0:26	
Heavyweight +95 kg	(Serbia) Rade Opačić	def.	(Democratic Republic of the Congo) Mike Kena	Decision (unanimous)	3	3:00	Last Heavyweight Standing Qualification Round Phase 2, Group 2 Semifinals
Heavyweight +95 kg	(Serbia) Miloš Cvjetićanin	def.	(Romania) Alin Nechita	Decision (unanimous)	3	3:00	Last Heavyweight Standing Qualification Round Phase 2, Group 2 Semifinals
Heavyweight +95 kg	(France) Sofian Laidouni	def.	(Morocco) Nabil Khachab	Decision (unanimous)	3	3:00	Last Heavyweight Standing Qualification Round Phase 2, Group 1 Semifinals
Superfights
Heavyweight +95 kg	(Netherlands) Levi Rigters	def.	(Russia) Asadulla Nasipov	KO (high knee)	3	0:36	Last Heavyweight Standing Qualification Round Phase 2, Group 1 Semifinals
Catchweight 74 kg	(Portugal) Miguel Trindade	def.	(Turkey) Khalil Kütükcü	Decision (unanimous)	3	3:00	
Featherweight 65 kg	(Albania) Berjan Peposhi	def.	(Spain) Aitor Currito	Decision (unanimous)	3	3:00	GLORY x RISE Last Featherweight Standing Second Round
Heavyweight +95 kg	(Morocco) Mohamed Amine	def.	(Netherlands) Errol Koning	Decision (unanimous)	3	3:00	Last Heavyweight Standing Qualification Round, Reserve fight

== Glory Collision 8 ==
Glory Collision 8
- Promotion: Glory
- Date: December 13, 2025
- Venue: GelreDome
- City: Arnhem, Netherlands
- Attendance: 8,000

Glory Collision 8 is a kickboxing event that was held by Glory on December 13, 2025, in Arnhem, Netherlands.

=== Background ===
The card will feature two wildcard bouts to determinate the last two participants in the Glory Last Heavyweight Standing Final Tournament.

=== 2025 Glory Light Heavyweight Tournament bracket ===
Semi-finals
(Ghana) Michael Boapeah	UD
(Portugal) Iuri Fernandes	3
(Serbia) Miloš Cvjetićanin	TKO
(Turkey) Cem Caceres	1

Final
(Ghana) Michael Boapeah	UD
(Serbia) Miloš Cvjetićanin	3

=== 2025 Glory Welterweight Tournament bracket ===
Semi-finals
(Bulgaria) Teodor Hristov	UD
(Netherlands) Chico Kwasi	3
(Suriname) Don Sno	3
(Curaçao) Endy Semeleer	UD

Final
(Bulgaria) Teodor Hristov	3
(Curaçao) Endy Semeleer	UD

=== Fight card ===
Glory Collision 8 (DAZN)
Weight Class				Method	Round	Time	Notes
Heavyweight +95 kg	(Croatia) Antonio Plazibat	def.	(France) Nordine Mahieddine	Decision (unanimous)	3	3:00	Glory Last Heavyweight Standing Final Wildcard Fight
Heavyweight +95 kg	(Curaçao) Errol Zimmerman	def.	(Australia) Alex Simon	KO (punch)	1	1:18	Glory Last Heavyweight Standing Final Wildcard Fight
Welterweight 77 kg	(Curaçao) Endy Semeleer	def.	(Bulgaria) Teodor Hristov	Decision (unanimous)	3	3:00	2025 Glory Welteweight Tournament, Final
Light Heavyweight 95 kg	(Ghana) Michael Boapeah	def.	(Serbia) Miloš Cvjetićanin	Decision (unanimous)	3	3:00	2025 Glory Light Heavyweight Tournament, Final
Featherweight 65 kg	(Thailand) Petpanomrung Kiatmuu9	def.	(Germany) Denis Wosik	Decision (unanimous)	3	3:00	GLORY x RISE Last Featherweight Standing Second Round
Welterweight 77 kg	(Bulgaria) Teodor Hristov	def.	(Netherlands) Chico Kwasi	Decision (unanimous)	3	3:00	2025 Glory Welterweight Tournament, Semifinals
Welterweight 77 kg	(Curaçao) Endy Semeleer	def.	(Suriname) Don Sno	Decision (unanimous)	3	3:00	2025 Glory Welterweight Tournament, Semifinals
Welterweight 77 kg	(Netherlands) Figuereido Landman	def.	(Morocco) Ismail Ouzgni	KO (right punch)	1	01:00	2025 Glory Welterweight Tournament, Reserve
Light Heavyweight 95 kg	(Ghana) Michael Boapeah	def.	(Portugal) Iuri Fernandes	Decision (unanimous)	3	3:00	2025 Glory Light Heavyweight Tournament, Semifinals
Superfights
Light Heavyweight 95 kg	(Serbia) Miloš Cvjetićanin	def.	(Turkey) Cem Caceres	KO (right punch)	1	1:10	2025 Glory Light Heavyweight Tournament, Semifinals
Light Heavyweight 95 kg	(Netherlands) Luis Tavares	def.	(Morocco) Ismael Lazaar	Decision (unanimous)	3	3:00	2025 Glory Light Heavyweight Tournament, Reserve
Heavyweight +95 kg	(Morocco) Nidal Bchiri	def.	(Cape Verde) Nico Pereira Horta	TKO (three knockdowns)	1	2:59	
Featherweight 65 kg	(Portugal) Miguel Trindade	def.	(France) Bobo Sacko	Decision (unanimous)	3	3:00	GLORY x RISE Last Featherweight Standing Second Round
Featherweight 65 kg	(Mexico) Abraham Vidales	def.	(Italy) Achraf Aasila	Decision (unanimous)	3	3:00	GLORY x RISE Last Featherweight Standing Second Round

== See also ==
- 2025 in ONE Championship
- 2025 in K-1
- 2025 in RISE
- 2025 in Romanian kickboxing
- 2025 in Wu Lin Feng
