= Iraj Azizpour =

Iranian heavyweight kickboxer

- Born: Iraj Arallou Azizpour; 19 October 1988 (age 38); Tehran, Iran
- Height: 1.88 m (6 ft 2 in)
- Weight: 123.7 kg (273 lb; 19 st)
- Division: Heavyweight
- Reach: 76 in (193 cm)
- Style: Muay Thai, Kickboxing
- Stance: Orthodox

Kickboxing record
- Total: 33
- Wins: 23
- By knockout: 9
- Losses: 10

Iraj Azizpour (Persian: ایرج عزیزپور) is an Iranian heavyweight kickboxer. He is the former Kunlun Fight heavyweight kickboxing champion, and was ranked among the top 10 kickboxers in the world in 2018 by Liver Kick, as well as being ranked in the top ten by Combat Press between March 2018 and March 2019. Azizpour is currently ranked as the number 8th Heavyweight in the world by Combat Press

== Kickboxing career ==
In 2017 he participated in the International Federation of Muaythai Associations Amateur Championships. He won a silver medal, and was voted the Best Male Prospect in Muay Thai.

=== Kunlun Fight ===
Azizpour participated in the Kunlun Fight 2017 heavyweight tournament. In the quarter final round he faced Ye Xiang. He won the fight by unanimous decision. He faced Asihati in the semifinals and won the fight in the second round, by way of KO. Advancing to the finals, he fought Roman Kryklia for 2017 Kunlun Fight Heavyweight Tournament title. Azizpour won a majority decision.

He next fought Olivier Thompson under the MAS Fights banner. Azizpour won the fight by TKO, earning a $40,000 finish bonus as well.

In the 2019 Kunlun Fight 8-man Heavyweight Tournament, Azizpour lost in the quarterfinals to Brazilian Haime Morais. However, due to an injury Morais was unable to fight in the semifinals and Azizpour advanced to the semifinals as his replacement, where he defeated the Chinese fighter Asihati. Azizpour lost in the finals to Roman Kryklia.

Azizpour was next scheduled to fight for the interim FEA Heavyweight title against Pavel Zhuravlev. Azizpour was replaced by Mehmet Ozer.

=== ONE Championship ===
On 15 October 2021, it was announced that Azizpour was scheduled to face Roman Kryklia in a trilogy fight for the inaugural ONE Heavyweight Kickboxing World Championship at ONE Championship: NextGen on 29 October 2021. After Kryklia withdrew from the fight due to a medical issue, Azizpour faced Anderson Silva in a non-title fight. He won the fight by unanimous decision.

Azizpour was booked to face the 2012 K-1 Grand Prix runner-up Ismael Londt at ONE: Lights Out on 11 March 2022. After weathering an early storm in the first storm, Azizpour won the fight by second-round knockout.

==== ONE Kickboxing Heavyweight Grand Prix ====
Azizpour faced Bruno Chaves in the semifinals of the ONE Kickboxing Heavyweight Grand Prix at ONE 161 on 29 September 2022. He won the fight by unanimous decision.

Azizpour faced Roman Kryklia in the ONE Kickboxing Heavyweight Grand Prix finals, which were held at ONE 163 on 18 November 2022. It was the third time that the pair faced each other, with each holding a win over the other. Despite knocking Kyrklia down in the first round, he lost the fight by a second-round knockout.

Azizpour faced Rade Opačić at ONE 165 on 28 January 2024. He lost the fight by unanimous decision.

Azizpour faced Georgios Biniaris at Senshi 21 on 20 April 2024. He won the fight by a first-round knockout.

=== Glory ===
Azizpour took part in the Glory 99 "Heavyweight Last Man Standing Tournament" where 32 heavyweight fighters compete on 5 April 2025 in Rotterdam, Netherlands.

== Championships and accomplishments ==
=== Muay Thai ===
- International Federation of Muaythai Associations
  - 2017 IFMA 91+kg silver medal (silver)
  - 2017 IFMA Best Male Prospect

=== Kickboxing ===
- ONE Championship
  - 2022 ONE Heavyweight Kickboxing World Grand Prix Tournament Runner-Up
  - 2022 Kickboxing Fight of the Year vs. Roman Kryklia at ONE 163
- Kunlun Fight
  - 2017 Kunlun Fight Heavyweight Tournament winner

=== Boxing ===
- Siege of Abadan
  - 2017 Super heavyweight Tournament winner

== Fight record ==
Professional kickboxing record
23 wins (9 KOs), 10 losses, 0 draw
Date	Result	Opponent	Event	Location	Method	Round	Time	Record
2026-11-20	Loss	(Russia) Asadulla Nasipov	Army of Fighters 6	Istanbul, Turkey	Decision (split)	3	3:00	23–10
2026-10-02	Win	(Turkey) Eray Balcı	Lions Fight Night 3	Alanya, Turkey	KO (left high kick)	1	0:14	23–9
2025-06-14	Loss	(Morocco) Anis Bouzid	Glory 100 - Last Heavyweight Standing Qualification Round, Final	Rotterdam, Netherlands	Decision (unanimous)	3	3:00	22–9
Fails to qualify for the 2025 Glory Last Heavyweight Standing - Final Tournament.
2025-06-14	Win	(Romania) Ionuț Iancu	Glory 100 - Last Heavyweight Standing Qualification Round, Semifinals	Rotterdam, Netherlands	Decision (split)	3	3:00	22-8
2025-04-05	Win	(Italy) Yuri Farcaș	Glory 99 - Last Heavyweight Standing Opening Round	Rotterdam, Netherlands	KO (spinning backfist)	2	1:17	21-8
2024-12-06	Loss	(Russia) Nikita Ivanov	Nashe Delo 86	Saint Petersburg, Russia	TKO (retirement)	1	0:37	20–8
2024-04-20	Win	(Greece) Georgios Biniaris	SENSHI 21	Varna, Bulgaria	KO (knee to the body)	1	3:00	20–7
2024-01-28	Loss	(Serbia) Rade Opačić	ONE 165	Tokyo, Japan	Decision (unanimous)	3	3:00	19–7
2022-11-19	Loss	(Ukraine) Roman Kryklia	ONE 163, Tournament Final	Kallang, Singapore	TKO (punches)	2	1:28	19–6
For the ONE Heavyweight Kickboxing World Grand Prix title.
2022-09-29	Win	(Brazil) Bruno Chaves	ONE 161, Tournament Semifinal	Kallang, Singapore	Decision (unanimous)	3	3:00	19–5
2022-03-11	Win	(Netherlands) Ismael Londt	ONE: Lights Out	Kallang, Singapore	KO (punches)	2	2:01	18–5
2021-10-29	Win	(Brazil) Anderson Silva	ONE Championship: NextGen	Kallang, Singapore	Decision (unanimous)	3	3:00	17–5
2019-02-24	Loss	(Ukraine) Roman Kryklia	Kunlun Fight 80 – Heavyweight Tournament Final	Shanghai, China	Decision (unanimous)	3	3:00	16–5
For the 2019 KLF 100+ kg World Championship Tournament title.
2019-02-24	Win	(China) Asihati	Kunlun Fight 80 – Heavyweight Tournament Semifinal	Shanghai, China	KO (punches)	3	3:00	16–4
2019-02-24	Loss	(Brazil) Haime Morais	Kunlun Fight 80 - Heavyweight Tournament Quarterfinal	Shanghai, China	Decision (split)	3	3:00	15–4
2018-11-12	Win	(United Kingdom) Olivier Thompson	MAS Fight	Macau, China	KO	3	N/A	15–3
2018-02-04	Win	(Ukraine) Roman Kryklia	Kunlun Fight 69 – Heavyweight Tournament Final	Guiyang, China	Ext.R decision (majority)	4	3:00	14–3
Wins the Kunlun Fight 2017 Heavyweight Tournament.
2018-02-04	Win	(China) Asihati	Kunlun Fight 69 – Heavyweight Tournament Semifinal	Guiyang, China	KO	2	N/A	13–3
2017-12-17	Win	(China) Ye Xiang	Kunlun Fight 68 – Heavyweight Tournament Quarterfinal	Zunyi, China	Decision (unanimous)	3	3:00	12–3
Legend: Win Loss Draw/no contest Notes

Amateur Kickboxing record
Date	Result	Opponent	Event	Location	Method	Round	Time
2017-05-12	Loss	(Ukraine) Tsotne Rogava	IFMA World Championship 2017, Final	Minsk, Belarus	Decision	3	3:00
Wins 2017 IFMA World Championships +91kg Silver Medal.
2017-05-10	Win	(Belarus) Andrey Gerasimchuk	IFMA World Championship 2017, Semi Final	Minsk, Belarus	KO	3	3:00
2017-05-07	Win	(Russia) Semen Shelepov	IFMA World Championship 2017, Quarter Final	Minsk, Belarus	Decision (unanimous)	3	3:00
2011-09-22	Loss	(Belgium) Sebastien Van Thielen	IFMA World Championships 2011	Tashkent, Uzbekistan	Decision	4	2:00
Legend: Win Loss Draw/no contest Notes

== See also ==
- List of male kickboxers
