= Mory Kromah =

Dutch-Guinean kickboxer

- Born: August 4, 1999 (age 27); Amsterdam, Netherlands
- Other names: The Black Ghost
- Nationality: Dutch and Guinean
- Height: 1.94 m (6 ft 4 1/2 in)
- Weight: 103.9 kg (229 lb; 16.36 st)
- Stance: Orthodox
- Team: Siam Gym

Kickboxing record
- Total: 41
- Wins: 37
- By knockout: 23
- Losses: 3
- Draws: 1

Mory Kromah (born August 4, 1999) is a Guinean-Dutch kickboxer. He currently competes in the Heavyweight division of GLORY, where he is the current Glory Heavyweight Champion. He has formerly competed for Enfusion, where he was the former World Light Heavyweight Champion.

As of June 1, 2026, he is the #1 ranked Heavyweight Kickboxer in the world according to Beyond kickboxing.

== Career ==
=== Enfusion ===
Kromah faced Youness Benmalek at Enfusion 118 on February 11, 2023, for the vacant Light Heavyweight title. Kromah won the fight by first round doctor stoppage.

Kromah successfully defended his Enfusion Light Heavyweight title on October 14, 2023, at Enfusion 126 where he defeated Steven van den Broek by unanimous decision.

=== Glory ===
Kromah made his debut for the Glory promotion on May 18, 2024, at Glory 92 against Anis Bouzid. He won the fight at the end of the first round by doctor stoppage.

For his second fight with Glory Kromah faced Mohammed Amine at Glory 94 on August 31, 2024. He won by second-round knockout with a flying knee.

Kromah faced Miloš Cvjetićanin at Glory Collision 7 on December 7, 2024. He won the fight by unanimous decision.

Kromah faced Cem Cáceres at Glory 98 on February 22, 2025. He lost the fight by split decision.

Kromah moved up a weight class to take part in the Glory 99 “Heavyweight Last Man Standing Tournament”, where 32 heavyweight fighters competed on April 5, 2025, in Rotterdam, Netherlands. He stepped in on a month's notice as a replacement for the injured Uku Jürjendal to face Nicolas Wamba. Kromah won the fight by a second-round technical knockout, as Wamba was forced to retire from the bout with an achilles tendon injury.

Kromah faced Alin Nechita in the semifinals of the Last Heavyweight Standing Qualification Round tournament, held at Glory 100 on June 14, 2025. He won the fight by unanimous decision and advanced to the finals of the one-day tournament, where he faced Bahram Rajabzadeh. Kromah won the fight by a first-round knockout.

Kromah fought Cristian Ristea at Glory 103, in a non-tournament bout. He won via TKO in round 2, due to a nose injury.

In October, 2025 Kromah was involved in an accident in Thailand, where he was on holiday. While riding a motor scooter, a car crashed into him at an intersection. Kromah was brought to a hospital and lost his front teeth in the collision. The injuries he sustained caused him to miss the original date for the Last Heavyweight Standing tournament Finale at Collision 8. Later it was announced the tournament would be postponed till Glory 105.

At Glory 105, Kromah was victorious over Michael Boapeah in the quarterfinals of the Last Heavyweight Standing tournament, after his original opponent, Antonio Plazibat, had to withdraw with an injury. In the semi-final he won a unanimous decision over favourite Tariq Osaro. His opponent for the final, Miloš Cvjetićanin, did not get medically cleared to fight and the reserve fighters refused to step in crowning Kromah the winner of the tournament and new Glory Heavyweight Champion.

Kromah would face Cvjetićanin in a rematch at Glory Collision 9, on June 13, 2026. He won the bout via KO in the third round, dropping and stopping Cvjetićanin with a flying knee.

== Titles and accomplishments ==
- Glory
  - 2025 Glory Knockout of the Year (vs. Bahram Rajabzadeh)
  - 2026 Glory Last Heavyweight Standing Finals Tournament Winner
  - 2026 Glory Heavyweight Championship
    - One successful title defense
- Enfusion
  - 2023 Enfusion World Light Heavyweight Championship
    - One successful defense

Awards

- 2025 Combat Press Knockout of the Year (vs. Bahram Rajabzadeh)
- 2025 Beyond Kickboxing Knockout of the Year (vs. Bahram Rajabzadeh)

== Kickboxing record ==
Professional kickboxing record
37 Wins (23 (T)KOs), 3 Losses, 1 Draw
Date	Result	Opponent	Event	Location	Method	Round	Time
2026-12-12		(Croatia) Antonio Plazibat	Glory Collision 10	Arnhem, Netherlands			
Defending the Glory Heavyweight Championship.
2026-06-13	Win	(Serbia) Miloš Cvjetićanin	Glory Collision 9	Rotterdam, Netherlands	KO Flying Knee	3	1:56
Defends the Glory Heavyweight Championship.
2026-02-07	Win	(Nigeria) Tariq Osaro	Glory 105 - Last Heavyweight Standing Finals Tournament, Semifinals	Arnhem, Netherlands	Decision (Unanimous)	3	3:00
No opponent was cleared for the final, Kromah was declared winner by default of the Glory Last Heavyweight Standing Finals Tournament and won the vacant Glory Heavyweight Championship.
2026-02-07	Win	(Ghana) Michael Boapeah	Glory 105 - Last Heavyweight Standing Finals Tournament, Quarterfinals	Arnhem, Netherlands	Decision (Unanimous)	3	3:00
2025-08-23	Win	(Romania) Cristian Ristea	Glory 103	Rotterdam, Netherlands	TKO (nose injury)	2	2:16
2025-06-14	Win	(Azerbaijan) Bahram Rajabzadeh	Glory 100, Last Heavyweight Standing Qualification Round, Final	Rotterdam, Netherlands	KO (Flying knee)	1	2:14
Qualifies for Glory Last Heavyweight Standing Finals Tournament.
2025-06-14	Win	(Romania) Alin Nechita	Glory 100, Last Heavyweight Standing Qualification Round, Semifinals	Rotterdam, Netherlands	Decision (Unanimous)	3	3:00
2025-04-05	Win	(France) Nicolas Wamba	Glory 99 - Last Heavyweight Standing, Opening Round	Rotterdam, Netherlands	TKO (injury)	2	1:37
2025-02-22	Loss	(Turkey) Cem Cáceres	Glory 98	Rotterdam, Netherlands	Decision (Split)	3	3:00
2024-12-07	Win	(Serbia) Miloš Cvjetićanin	Glory Collision 7	Arnhem, Netherlands	Decision (Unanimous)	3	3:00
2024-08-31	Win	(Morocco) Mohammed Amine	Glory 94	Antwerp, Belgium	KO (Flying knee)	2	2:59
2024-05-18	Win	(Morocco) Anis Bouzid	Glory 92	Rotterdam, Netherlands	TKO (retirement/injury)	1	3:00
2024-03-02	Win	(Turkey) Gurkan Basak	Enfusion 134	Nijmegen, Netherlands	Decision (Unanimous)	3	3:00
2023-10-14	Win	(Netherlands) Steven van den Broek	Enfusion 126	Nijmegen, Netherlands	Decision (Unanimous)	5	3:00
Defended the Enfusion World Light Heavyweight Championship.
2023-02-11	Win	(Belgium) Youness Benmalek	Enfusion 118	Nijmegen, Netherlands	TKO (Doctor stoppage)	1	
Won the vacant Enfusion World Light Heavyweight Championship.
2022-12-10	Win	(Portugal) Yuri Ceita	Fights at the Border	Lommel, Belgium	Decision (Unanimous)	3	3:00
2022-09-24	Win	(Netherlands) Andres van Engelen	Enfusion 111 & 112	Eindhoven, Netherlands	Decision (Unanimous)	3	3:00
2022-03-26	Win	(Morocco) Nabil Khachab	Enfusion 106	Arnhem, Netherlands	Decision (Unanimous)	3	3:00
2022-03-26	Win	(Turkey) Yasin Güren	Enfusion 105	Alkmaar, Netherlands	Decision (Unanimous)	3	3:00
2021-10-23	Win	(Turkey) Mert Dastelen	Enfusion Talents 86	Wuppertal, Germany	TKO	2	
2021-07-16	Win	(Morocco) Chahid Chaquibi	Enfusion Cage Events 5, Tournament Final	Alkmaar, Netherlands	Decision (Unanimous)	3	3:00
2021-07-16	Win	(Turkey) Yasin Güren	Enfusion Cage Events 5, Tournament Semifinal	Alkmaar, Netherlands	TKO (Doctor stoppage)	2	
2020-10-09	Win	(Iraq) Amir Al Amir	Enfusion Cage Events 4	Alkmaar, Netherlands	Decision	3	3:00
2020-02-29	Draw	(Netherlands) Jimmy Livinus	Enfusion Talents 79	Eindhoven, Netherlands	Decision	3	3:00
2019-11-02	Win	(Belgium) Soulaiman Bouanan	Enfusion Rookies	Antwerp, Belgium	Decision	3	3:00
2019-10-06	Win	(Netherlands)			KO	1	
2019-06-16	Win	(Morocco) Hamza Ourahou	Buy 2 Fight	Alkmaar, Netherlands	Decision	3	3:00
2019-06-08	Win	(Netherlands) Piet van den Berg	Enfusion Talents 71	Groningen, Netherlands	TKO	2	
Legend: Win Loss Draw/No contest Notes

== See also ==
- List of male kickboxers
