= Mehdi Ait El Hadj =

Moroccan-French kickboxer

- Born: 1 December 1998 (age 27); Roubaix, France
- Height: 183 cm (6 ft 0 in)
- Weight: 77 kg (170 lb; 12 st 2 lb)
- Division: Welterweight
- Style: Kickboxing
- Stance: Orthodox
- Fighting out of: Valenciennes, France
- Team: Fight Fitness Factory 59
- Trainer: Youssef Hallouane

Kickboxing record
- Total: 43
- Wins: 35
- Losses: 6
- By knockout: 0
- Draws: 2

Mehdi Ait El Hadj (born 1 December 1998) is a Moroccan-French kickboxer who is ranked number 4 in the Glory Welterweight division.

== Biography ==
Mehdi Ait El Hadj was born and raised in Roubaix. His parents originate from Chichaoua, a city in the Sous-region in the south of Morocco.

== Kickboxing career ==
Mehdi started kickboxing as a teenager. He stayed in the gym late and often used online videos to teach himself new techniques.

=== Rise to Glory ===
Mehdi Ait El Hadj faced Teodor Hristov at Senshi 15 on February 18, 2023. He lost the fight by unanimous decision.

Mehdi faced Florin Lambagiu at Senshi 17 on July 8, 2023. He won the fight by unanimous decision.

Mehdi faced Alex Fernandez at Senshi 18 on September 16, 2023. He won the fight by unanimous decision.

=== Glory ===
In January 2025, Ait El Hadj announced he had signed a two-year contract with Glory promotion.

On April 27, 2024, at Glory 91 Ait El Hadj made his Glory debut against Ismail Ouzgni. He won the fight by split decision.

Ait El Hadj fought Don Sno at Glory 93 on July 20, 2024. He won the fight by unanimous decision.

Ait El Hadj fought Soufian Aoulad-Abdelkhalek at Glory 96, on October 12, 2024. He won the fight by split decision.

Ait El Hadj next challenged Chico Kwasi for the Glory Welterweight Championship at Glory 103, losing via unanimous decision.

== Titles and accomplishments ==
- International Sport Kickboxing Association
  - 2022 ISKA K-1 European Super-middleweight (78 kg) Champion

== Kickboxing record ==
Professional kickboxing record
35 wins (8 (T)KO's), 6 losses, 2 draws
Date	Result	Opponent	Event	Location	Method	Round	Time
2026-06-13	Loss	(Netherlands) Figuereido Landman	Glory Collision 9	Rotterdam, Netherlands	Decision (unanimous)	3	3:00
2025-08-23	Loss	(Netherlands) Chico Kwasi	Glory 103	Rotterdam, Netherlands	Decision (unanimous)	5	3:00
For the Glory Welterweight Championship.
2025-02-22	Win	(Netherlands) Robin Ciric	Glory 98	Rotterdam, Netherlands	Decision (split)	3	3:00
2024-10-12	Win	(Morocco) Soufian Aoulad-Abdelkhalek	Glory 96	Rotterdam, Netherlands	Decision (split)	3	3:00
2024-07-20	Win	(Suriname) Don Sno	Glory 93	Rotterdam, Netherlands	Decision (unanimous)	3	3:00
2024-04-27	Win	(Morocco) Ismail Ouzgni	Glory 91	Paris, France	Decision (split)	3	3:00
2023-11-18	Win	(France) Tarik Ben Ahmed	La Nuit des Champions 30	Marseille, France	Decision (unanimous)	3	3:00
2023-09-16	Win	(Spain) Alex Fernández	Senshi 18	Varna, Bulgaria	Decision (unanimous)	5	3:00
2023-07-08	Win	(Romania) Florin Lambagiu	Senshi 17	Varna, Bulgaria	Decision (unanimous)	3	3:00
2023-02-18	Loss	(Bulgaria) Teodor Hristov	Senshi 15	Varna, Bulgaria	Decision (unanimous)	3	3:00
2022-10-29	Loss	(France) Boris Siva	La Nuit du K1 2022	France	Decision (majority)	3	3:00
2022-09-10	Loss	(Romania) Florin Lambagiu	Senshi 13	Varna, Bulgaria	Ext. R decision (split)	4	3:00
2022-06-25	Win	(France) Assane Bafeta	Le Défi du Nack Muay 7	Denain, France	Decision (majority)	3	3:00
2022-05-14	Win	(Netherlands) Damian Ori	Fighting Edition	Orchies, France	Decision (unanimous)	5	3:00
Wins the vacant ISKA K-1 European Super-middleweight title
2021-11-12	Win	(Morocco) Soufiane El Ballouti	Enfusion Talents 87	Abu Dabhi, United Arab Emirates	Decision (unanimous)	3	3:00
2021-10-16	Win	(Belgium) Karim Taquet	Fighting Edition	Valenciennes, France	Decision (majority)	3	3:00
2019-04-13	Win	(Spain) Juwara Yankuba	Enfusion Talents 67	Orchies, France	Decision (unanimous)	3	3:00
2018-04-03	Win	(France) Sylvain Moreau	Conceptuel Fight	Orchies, France	TKO (3 knockdowns)	3	3:00
Legend: Win Loss Draw/no contest Notes
