= Anis Bouzid =

Belgian-Moroccan professional kickboxer

- Born: 1 February 1995 (age 31); Charleroi, Belgium
- Other names: Takamura
- Height: 1.94 m (6 ft 4 in)
- Weight: 110 kg (243 lb; 17 st 5 lb)
- Style: Kickboxing, Boxing
- Stance: Orthodox
- Fighting out of: Charleroi, Belgium
- Team: DC Boxing (kickboxing); Esquive Carolo (boxing)

Professional boxing record
- Total: 3
- Wins: 3
- By knockout: 3
- Losses: 0

Kickboxing record
- Total: 23
- Wins: 17
- By knockout: 6
- Losses: 6
- By knockout: 2

Other information
- Boxing record from BoxRec

Anis Bouzid (born 1 February 1995) is a Belgian-Moroccan kickboxer and boxer. He is currently signed with GLORY, where he competes in the Light Heavyweight and Heavyweight divisions.

He was ranked as the #10 heavyweight by Combat Press as of November 2026,

== Kickboxing career ==
=== Early career ===
Bouzid faced Razvan Furdui at Chokmuay World Organization on 13 March 2016. He won the fight by second-round technical knockout.

On 12 November 2016, Bouzid travelled to Poland to face Aleksander Kruk at the A1 event. He won the fight by decision.

On 3 June 2017, Bouzid faced Mehdi Bouanane at the Fighters - The Way Of The Champions 3 event for the AFSO K-1 World -82.5 kg title. He won the fight by unanimous decision.

On 5 November 2017, Bouzid faced Khalid El Bakouri at MTK Fight Night 2 for the vacant WFFC European -86 kg title. He won the fight by unanimous decision.

On 12 January 2019, Bouzid faced Assane Bafeta at the Challenge TTT XIII event in Wattrelos, France. He won the fight by unanimous decision.

Bouzid made his debut for the Enfusion promotion on 7 December 2018, at Enfusion 77 against Selahattin Şahin. He won the fight by first-round technical knockout.

Bouzid was scheduled to face Khalid El Bakouri for the vacant Enfusion -84 kg title at Enfusion 87 on 7 September 2019. He lost the fight by unanimous decision.

On 27 November 2021, Bouzid faced Giuseppe De Domenico at KO Fighting Circus in Bologna, Italy. He won the fight by unanimous decision.

=== Glory ===
Bouzid made his debut for the Glory promotion on 18 May 2024, at Glory 92 against Mory Kromah. He lost the fight at the end of the first round by doctor stoppage.

On 5 April 2025, Bouzid took part in the opening round of the 2025 Last Heavyweight Standing Tournament at Glory 99 against Nathan Cook. He won the fight in just 28 seconds with a series of punches.

On 13 June 2025, Bouzid took part in the Glory Last Heavyweight Standing 4-man qualification tournament at Glory 100. In the semifinals he defeated Asadulla Nasipov by extension round unanimous decision after scoring a knockdown in the first round. In the final he defeated Iraj Azizpour by unanimous decision and qualified for the Glory Last Heavyweight Standing - Final Tournament happening the next December.

On 7 February 2026, Bouzid took part in the Finals Tournament of the LHWS Tournament at Glory 105, now for the vacant Glory Heavyweight Title, following Rico Verhoeven's departure from both the organization and the sport as a whole. He faced Errol Zimmerman in the Quarterfinals, where after surviving an early barrage from Zimmerman, he went on to win by unanimous decision. He then faced Miloš Cvjetićanin in the Semifinals, where despite getting dropped in the first round, he engaged Cvjetićanin in a back and forth war, ultimately losing by unanimous decision.

Bouzid returned at Glory Collision 9, on 13 June 2026. He faced former Interim Heavyweight Title Challenger Antonio Plazibat. Plazibat dropped Bouzid in the first round, but Bouzid mounted a comeback in the following two rounds, causing the fight to initially be scored a draw. This triggered a fourth extension round, to be scored individually. Bouzid would be stopped in this round, after absorbing a powerful eight punch combination from Plazibat that sent him to the canvas.

== Professional boxing career ==
For his third professional boxing fight Bouzid faced Michel Moreira on 15 February 2025, in an event promoted by his gym, L'esquive Carolo, in Charleroi, Belgium. He won the fight by second-round knockout.

== Personal life ==
=== Legal troubles ===
On 21 June 2015, Bouzid was involved in a brawl that led to the death of a man outside a club in Charleroi, Belgium. Bouzid was sentenced to 200 hours of community service or, failing that, a three-year prison sentence.

== Titles and accomplishments ==
- Glory
  - 2025 Breakout Fighter of the Year
- All Fight System Organization
  - 2017 AFSO K-1 World -82.5 kg Champion
- 2017 WFFC European -86 kg Champion

== Kickboxing record ==
Professional Kickboxing record
17 Wins (6 (T)KO’s), 6 Losses
Date	Result	Opponent	Event	Location	Method	Round	Time
2026-06-13	Loss	(Croatia) Antonio Plazibat	Glory Collision 9	Rotterdam, Netherlands	KO (Punches)	4	1:39
2026-02-07	Loss	(Serbia) Miloš Cvjetićanin	Glory 105 - Last Heavyweight Standing Finals Tournament, Semifinals	Arnhem, Netherlands	Decision (Majority)	3	3:00
2026-02-07	Win	(Curaçao) Errol Zimmerman	Glory 105 - Last Heavyweight Standing Finals Tournament, Quarterfinals	Arnhem, Netherlands	Decision (Unanimous)	3	3:00
2025-06-13	Win	(Iran) Iraj Azizpour	Glory 100 - Last Heavyweight Standing Qualification Round, Final	Rotterdam, Netherlands	Decision (Unanimous)	3	3:00
Qualifies for Glory Last Heavyweight Standing Finals Tournament.
2025-06-13	Win	(Russia) Asadulla Nasipov	Glory 100 - Last Heavyweight Standing Qualification Round, Semifinals	Rotterdam, Netherlands	Ext.R Decision (Unanimous)	4	3:00
2025-04-05	Win	(United Kingdom) Nathan Cook	Glory 99 - Last Heavyweight Standing Opening Round	Rotterdam, Netherlands	TKO (punches)	1	0:28
2024-05-18	Loss	(Guinea) Mory Kromah	Glory 92	Rotterdam, Netherlands	TKO (arm injury)	1	3:00
2021-11-27	Win	(Italy) Giuseppe De Domenico	KO Fighting Circus 2021	Bologna, Italy	Decision (Unanimous)	3	3:00
2020-10-03	Win	(Netherlands) Piet van den Berg	Enfusion 98	Alkmaar, Netherlands	Decision (Unanimous)	3	3:00
2019-09-07	Loss	(Morocco) Khalid El Bakouri	Enfusion 87	Darmstadt, Germany	Decision (Unanimous)	5	3:00
For the vacant Enfusion Middleweight (-84 kg) title.
2019-04-13	Win	(Angola) Aristote Quitusisa	Enfusion 82	Orchies, France	TKO	3	
2019-01-12	Win	(France) Assane Bafeta	Challenge TTT XIII	Wattrelos, France	Decision (Unanimous)	3	3:00
2018-12-07	Win	(Turkey) Selahattin Şahin	Enfusion 77	Abu Dhabi, UAE	TKO (Doctor stoppage)	1	
2018-10-06	Win	(France) Badr Dayf	Fight Night & Day	La Louvière, Belgium	KO (Punches)	1	0:44
2018-09-15	Loss	(Austria) Karim Mabrouk	Tosan Fight Night	Vienna, Austria	Decision	3	3:00
2018-03-24	Win	(Belgium) Thomas Teres	Kickboxing / MuayThai	Chapelle-lez-Herlaimont, Belgium	KO		
2017-11-05	Win	(Morocco) Khalid El Bakouri	MTK Fight Night 2	Charleroi, Belgium	Decision (Unanimous)	5	3:00
Wins the vacant WFFC European -86kg title.
2017-06-03	Win	(France) Mehdi Bouanane	Fighters - The Way Of The Champions 3	Oberkorn, Luxemburg	Decision (Unanimous)	5	3:00
Wins the AFSO K-1 World -82.5 kg title.
2017-04-29	Win	(Belgium) Mbamba Cauwenbergh	K1 Event VIP 3, Final	Troyes, France	Decision	3	3:00
2017-04-29	Win	(France) Romain Falendry	K1 Event VIP 3, Semifinals	Troyes, France	Decision	3	3:00
2016-11-12	Win	(Poland) Aleksander Kruk	A1	Poznań, Poland	Decision	3	3:00
2016-03-13	Win	(Romania) Răzvan Furdui	Chokmuay World Organization	Saint-Josse-ten-Noode, Belgium	TKO	2	
Legend: Win Loss Draw/No contest Notes

== Professional boxing record ==
3 fights	3 wins	0 losses
By knockout	3	0

No.	Result	Record	Opponent	Type	Round, time	Date	Location	Notes
3	Win	3–0	Michel Moreira	RTD	2 (6), 1:45	15 February 2025	La Garenne, Charleroi, Belgium	
2	Win	2–0	Eduardo Sacramento da Silveira	KO	1 (6), 2:03	1 June 2024	La Garenne, Charleroi, Belgium	
1	Win	1–0	Ibrahim Odobasic	KO	1 (4)	25 November 2023	Dome Arena, Charleroi, Belgium	

== See also ==
- List of male kickboxers
