= Roman Shcherbatiuk =

Ukrainian kickboxer (born 1997)

- Born: Roman Valeriyovych Shcherbatiuk; 26 June 1997 (age 29); Cherkasy, Ukraine
- Height: 185 cm (6 ft 1 in)
- Weight: 98 kg (216 lb; 15 st 6 lb)
- Division: Light heavyweight
- Style: Kickboxing
- Stance: Orthodox
- Fighting out of: Cherkasy, Ukraine
- Team: Vulkan
- Years active: 2016 - present

Kickboxing record
- Total: 2
- Wins: 1
- By knockout: 1
- Losses: 0
- Draws: 1

Roman Valeriyovych Shcherbatiuk (Ukrainian: Роман Валерійович Щербатюк; born 26 June 1997) is a Ukrainian kickboxer.

== Background ==
Shcherbatiuk studied at the Cherkasy Secondary School No. 7. He graduated from the Institute of Physical Culture, Sports and Health of the Cherkasy National University.

== Kickboxing career ==
Shcherbatiuk faced Khasankhon Baratov for the WAKO Intercontinental Super Heavyweight (+91 kg) K-1 title at 2021 Uzbek Open on June 16, 2021. He won the fight by a fourth-round knockout.

In April 2022, following the Russian invasion of Ukraine, Shcherbatiuk joined the 118th Territorial Defense Brigade and took part in the Battle of Popasna. He was allowed to leave the armed forces in June to take part in the 2022 World Games, where he competed in the -91 kg kickboxing division. He captured the bronze medal, having lost to Bahram Rajabzadeh in the semifinals. In August 2022, he was awarded the "For Labor and Victory" medal, a state award given by the president of Ukraine to individuals for significant merits in strengthening Ukrainian statehood, courage and self-sacrifice shown in the protection of the sovereignty and territorial integrity of Ukraine.

== Championships and accomplishments ==
=== Professional ===
- World Association of Kickboxing Organizations
  - 2021 WAKO Pro K-1 Intercontinental Super Heavyweight (+91 kg) Champion

=== Amateur ===
- World Games
  - 2022 World Games Kickboxing +91 kg (bronze)
  - 2025 World Games K-1 91 kg (gold)
- World Association of Kickboxing Organizations
  - 2025 WAKO World Championship (+91 kg) K-1 (gold)
  - 2024 WAKO European Championship (+91 kg) K-1 (gold)
  - 2023 WAKO World Championship (+91 kg) K-1 (gold)
  - 2022 Hungarian Kickboxing World Cup (+91 kg) K-1 (gold)
  - 2021 WAKO World Championship (+91 kg) K-1 (bronze)
  - 2019 WAKO World Championship (-91 kg) K-1 (silver)
  - 2019 Hungarian Kickboxing World Cup (-91 kg) K-1 (gold)
  - 2018 WAKO European Championship (-91 kg) K-1 (bronze)
  - 2017 WAKO World Championship (-91 kg) K-1 (gold)
- European University Sports Association
  - 2019 EUSA Combat Championship (-84 kg) K-1 (silver)

== Kickboxing record ==
Kickboxing record
2 Wins (1 (T)KO's), 0 Losses, 1 Draw
Date	Result	Opponent	Event	Location	Method	Round	Time
2023-12-17	Win	(Ukraine) Vitalii Korchak	Legion Pro Kickboxing Professional	Ukraine	Decision (Unanimous)	5	3:00
2021-06-16	Win	(Uzbekistan) Khasankhon Baratov	2021 Uzbek Open	Tashkent, Uzbekistan	KO (Low kick)	4	1:12
Wins the WAKO Intercontinental Super Heavyweight (+91 kg) K-1 title.
2017	Draw	(Kazakhstan) Ersultan Bekenov	Steppe Fighters	Astana, Kazakhstan	Decision	5	3:00
Legend: Win Loss Draw/No contest Notes

Amateur kickboxing record
Date	Result	Opponent	Event	Location	Method	Round	Time
2025-11-28	Win	(Poland) Robert Dochod	2025 WAKO World Championship, Final	Abu Dhabi, UAE	Decision (3:0)	3	2:00
Wins 2025 WAKO World Championship K-1 +91 kg Gold Medal.
2025-11-27	Win	(Croatia) Anto Siric	2025 WAKO World Championship, Semifinals	Abu Dhabi, UAE	Decision (3:0)	3	2:00
2025-11-26	Win	(Lithuania) Modestas Juodpusis	2025 WAKO World Championship, Quarterfinals	Abu Dhabi, UAE	Decision (3:0)	3	2:00
2025-08-14	Win	(Turkey) Emin Ozer	2025 World Games - K-1 Tournament, Final	Chengdu, China	Decision (3:0)	3	2:00
Wins 2025 World Games K-1 91 kg Gold Medal.
2025-08-13	Win	(France) Abdarhmane Coulibaly	2025 World Games - K-1 Tournament, Semifinals	Chengdu, China	Decision (3:0)	3	2:00
2025-08-12	Win	(China) Haifeng Shi	2025 World Games - K-1 Tournament, Quarterfinals	Chengdu, China	Decision (3:0)	3	2:00
2024-11-08	Win	(Turkey) Emin Ozer	2024 WAKO European Championships, Final	Athens, Greece	Decision (3:0)	3	2:00
Wins the 2024 WAKO European Championship K-1 Super Heavyweight (+91 kg) Gold Medal.
2024-11-07	Win	(Portugal) Iuri Fernandes	2024 WAKO European Championships, Semifinals	Athens, Greece	Decision (2:1)	3	2:00
2024-11-06	Win	(Spain) Mohamed Hamdi Hajji	2024 WAKO European Championships, Quarterfinals	Athens, Greece	Decision (3:0)	3	2:00
2023-11-	Win	(Croatia) Anto Siric	2023 WAKO World Championship, Tournament Final	Albufeira, Portugal	Decision (3:0)	3	2:00
Wins the 2023 WAKO World Championship K-1 (+91 kg) Gold Medal.
2023-11-	Win	(Bosnia and Herzegovina) Alja Tucak	2023 WAKO World Championship, Semifinals	Albufeira, Portugal	Decision (3:0)	3	2:00
2023-11-	Win	(Portugal) Iuri Fernandes	2023 WAKO World Championship, Quarterfinals	Albufeira, Portugal	Decision (2:1)	3	2:00
2023-06-18	Win	(Lithuania) Modestas Ioudpusis	28th Hungarian Kickboxing World Cup, Kickboxing Final +91 kg	Budapest, Hungary	Decision (3:0)	3	2:00
Wins the Hungarian Kickboxing World Cup Super Heavyweight (+91 kg) K-1 Gold Medal.
2022-07-14	Win	(Finland) Pirkka Suksi	World Games 2022 - Kickboxing Bronze Medal Fight	Birmingham, United States	Decision (3:0)	3	2:00
Wins 2022 World Games Kickboxing Bronze Medal +91 kg.
2022-07-13	Loss	(Azerbaijan) Bahram Rajabzadeh	World Games 2022 - Kickboxing Tournament Semifinals	Birmingham, United States	Decision (3:0)	3	2:00
2022-07-13	Win	(Venezuela) Oscar Higuera	World Games 2022 - Kickboxing Tournament Quarterfinals	Birmingham, United States	Decision (3:0)	3	2:00
2022-06-05	Win	(Poland) Robert Dochod	27th Hungarian Kickboxing World Cup, Final	Budapest, Hungary	Decision (3:0)	3	2:00
Wins the Hungarian Kickboxing World Cup K-1 Super Heavyweight (+91 kg) Gold Medal.
2022-06-05	Win	(Poland) Michal Turinsky	27th Hungarian Kickboxing World Cup, Semifinals	Budapest, Hungary	Decision (3:0)	3	2:00
2021-10-22	Loss	(Russia) Asadulla Nasipov	2021 WAKO World Championship, Semifinals	Lido di Jesolo, Italy	Decision (3:0)	3	2:00
Wins the 2021 WAKO World Championship K-1 Super Heavyweight (+91 kg) Bronze Medal.
2021-10-20	Win	(Azerbaijan) Bahram Rajabzadeh	2021 WAKO World Championship, Quarterfinals	Lido di Jesolo, Italy	Decision (2:1)	3	2:00
2021-10-18	Win	(Poland) Michal Blawdziewicz	2021 WAKO World Championship, Round of 16	Lido di Jesolo, Italy	Decision (2:1)	3	2:00
2021-09-17	Loss	(Poland) Michal Blawdziewicz	26th Hungarian Kickboxing World Cup, Semifinals	Budapest, Hungary	Decision (2:1)	3	2:00
Wins the Hungarian Kickboxing World Cup K-1 Super Heavyweight (+91 kg) Bronze Medal.
2021-09-16	Win	(Austria) Martin Gabl	26th Hungarian Kickboxing World Cup, Quarterfinals	Budapest, Hungary	Decision (3:0)	3	2:00
2019-11-28	Loss	(Poland) Michal Grzesiak	2019 WAKO World Championship, Quarterfinals	Antalya, Turkey	Decision (2:1)	3	2:00
2019-11-26	Win	(Hungary) Viktor Vigvary	2019 WAKO World Championship, Round of 16	Antalya, Turkey	Decision (3:0)	3	2:00
2019-10-27	Loss	(Lithuania) Sergej Maslobojev	2019 WAKO World Championship, Final	Sarajevo, Bosnia and Herzegovina	Decision (3:0)	3	2:00
Wins the 2019 WAKO World Championship K-1 Heavyweight (-91 kg) Silver Medal.
2019-10-26	Win	(Brazil) Willer Alves	2019 WAKO World Championship, Semifinals	Sarajevo, Bosnia and Herzegovina	Decision (3:0)	3	2:00
2019-10-25	Win	(Russia) Dmitry Vasenev	2019 WAKO World Championship, Quarterfinals	Sarajevo, Bosnia and Herzegovina	Decision (3:0)	3	2:00
2019-08-02	Loss	(Hungary) Vida Balázs	2019 EUSA Combat Championship, Final	Zagreb, Croatia	Decision (3:0)	3	2:00
Wins the 2019 EUSA Combat Championship K-1 (-84 kg) Silver Medal.
2019-08-02	Win	(Switzerland) Simon Philip	2019 EUSA Combat Championship, Semifinals	Zagreb, Croatia	Decision (3:0)	3	2:00
2019-08-02	Win	(Portugal) Diogo Castro	2019 EUSA Combat Championship, Quarterfinals	Zagreb, Croatia	Decision (3:0)	3	2:00
2019-06-16	Win	(Poland) Michał Mański	24th Bestfighter World Cup, Final	Rimini, Italy	Decision (3:0)	3	2:00
Wins the Bestfighter World Cup (-94 kg) Kick Light Gold Medal.
2019-06-15	Win	(Poland) Piotr Wypchal	24th Bestfighter World Cup, Semifinals	Rimini, Italy	Decision (3:0)	3	2:00
2019-05-19	Win	(Moldova) Sergiu Tihon	25th Hungarian Kickboxing World Cup, Final	Budapest, Hungary	Decision (3:0)	3	2:00
Wins the Hungarian Kickboxing World Cup K-1 Heavyweight (-91 kg) Gold Medal.
2019-05-18	Win	(Hungary) David Mihajlov	25th Hungarian Kickboxing World Cup, Semifinals	Budapest, Hungary	Decision (3:0)	3	2:00
2018-10-15	Loss	(Bosnia and Herzegovina) Ahmed Krnjić	2018 WAKO European Championship, Semifinals	Bratislava, Slovakia	Decision (2:1)	3	2:00
Wins the 2018 WAKO European Championship K-1 Heavyweight (-91 kg) Bronze Medal.
2018-10-13	Win	(Turkey) Yuruk Metin	2018 WAKO European Championship, Quarterfinal	Bratislava, Slovakia	Decision (3:0)	3	2:00
2017-11-	Win	(Bosnia and Herzegovina) Ahmed Krnjić	2017 WAKO World Championship, Final	Budapest, Hungary	Decision (2:1)	3	2:00
Wins the 2017 WAKO World Championship K-1 Heavyweight (-91 kg) Gold Medal.
2017-11-	Win	(Croatia) Toni Čatipović	2017 WAKO World Championship, Semifinals	Budapest, Hungary	Decision (3:0)	3	2:00
2017-11-	Win	(Brazil) Willer Alves	2017 WAKO World Championship, Quarterfinals	Budapest, Hungary	Decision (2:1)	3	2:00
2016-10-	Loss	(Croatia) Petr Kares	2016 WAKO European Championship, Quarterfinals	Maribor, Slovenia	Decision (3:0)	3	2:00
2016-10-	Win	(Bosnia and Herzegovina) Ahmed Krnjić	2016 WAKO European Championship, First Round	Maribor, Slovenia	Decision (3:0)	3	2:00
Legend: Win Loss Draw/No contest Notes
