= ONE 163 =

Combat sport events in 2022

ONE 163: Akimoto vs. Petchtanong
- The poster for ONE 163: Akimoto vs. Petchtanong
- Promotion: ONE Championship
- Date: November 19, 2022
- Venue: Singapore Indoor Stadium
- City: Kallang, Singapore

Event chronology
ONE on Prime Video 4: Abbasov vs. Lee	ONE 163: Akimoto vs. Petchtanong	ONE on Prime Video 5: de Ridder vs. Malykhin

ONE 163: Akimoto vs. Petchtanong was a Combat sport event produced by ONE Championship that took place on November 19, 2022, at the Singapore Indoor Stadium in Kallang, Singapore.

== Background ==
A ONE Bantamweight Kickboxing World Championship bout between current champion Hiroki Akimoto and Petchtanong Petchfergus served as the event headliner.

The ONE Heavyweight Kickboxing World Grand Prix Tournament Final bout between current ONE Light Heavyweight Kickboxing Champion Roman Kryklia and Iraj Azizpour served as the event's co-headliner. The pairing first met at Kunlun Fight 69 on February 4, 2018 for the 2018 Kunlun Fight +100 kg Tournament, where Azizpour won by extra round majority decision. Their second meeting took place at Kunlun Fight 80 on February 24, 2019 for the 2019 Kunlun Fight +100 kg Tournament, where Kryklia won by unanimous decision. The pairing was previously scheduled to headlined at ONE: NextGen for the inaugural ONE Heavyweight Kickboxing World Championship bout, but Kryklia withdraw due to an undisclosed medical issue.

A middleweight bout between former ONE Middleweight and Light Heavyweight World Champion Aung La Nsang and former UFC and WSOF Middleweight title contender Yushin Okami was originally expected to take place at ONE on Prime Video 4, but was postponed to this event for unknown reasons.

Kwon Won Il and Mark Abelardo were scheduled to meet in a bantamweight bout at ONE on Prime Video 4, but on November 4, it was announced that the bout will be moved to this event instead.

At the weigh-ins, Itsuki Hirata, Yuya Wakamatsu and Asahi Shinagawa all failed hydration test and were forced to take catchweights. Wakamatsu weighed in at 139 lbs, 4 pounds over the limit, Shinagawa came in at 126 lbs, 1 pounds over the limit, and Hirata failed weight and hydration. The bout proceeded at catchweight with Wakamatsu being fined 40% of his purse, which went to his opponent Woo Sung Hoon; Shinagawa being fined 20% of his purse, which went to his opponent Rui Botelho. but Hirata was scheduled to face former Rizin Women's Super Atomweight Champion Seo Hee Ham was the bout scrapped due to Hirata failed weight and hydration, and Ham did not agree to compete.

== Results ==
Main card (YouTube / Watch ONE)
Weight class				Method	Round	Time	Notes
Bantamweight Kickboxing	Petchtanong Petchfergus	def.	Hiroki Akimoto (c)	Decision (split) (50–46, 47–49, 50–45)	5	3:00	(Note: For the ONE Bantamweight Kickboxing World Championship.)
Heavyweight Kickboxing	Roman Kryklia	def.	Iraj Azizpour	TKO (punches)	2	1:28	(Note: ONE Heavyweight Kickboxing World Grand Prix Tournament Final bout.)
Lightweight	Saygid Izagakhmaev	def.	Shinya Aoki	TKO (punches)	1	1:26
Middleweight	Aung La Nsang	def.	Yushin Okami	TKO (punches)	1	1:42
Catchweight (139 lbs)	Woo Sung Hoon	def.	Yuya Wakamatsu	TKO (elbows and punches)	1	2:46	(Note: Wakamatsu missed weight (139 lbs).)
Bantamweight	Kwon Won Il	def.	Mark Abelardo	TKO (knee and punches)	3	3:44
Lead card (YouTube / Watch ONE)
Heavyweight Kickboxing	Ahmed Krnjic	def.	Bruno Chaves	Decision (unanimous)	3	3:00
Lightweight	Ahmed Mujtaba	def.	Abraão Amorim	Submission (triangle choke)	1	4:32
Catchweight (126 lbs) Muay Thai	Asahi Shinagawa	def.	Rui Botelho	Decision (split)	3	3:00	(Note: Shinagawa missed weight (126 lbs).)
Women's Strawweight Submission Grappling	Bianca Basílio	def.	Milena Kaori Sakumoto	Submission (rear-naked choke)	1	0:43
Featherweight	Kirill Gorobets	def.	Bruno Pucci	Decision (unanimous)	3	5:00

== Bonus awards ==
The following fighters received $50,000 bonuses.

- Performance of the Night: Roman Kryklia, Saygid Izagakhmaev, Woo Sung Hoon and Bianca Basilio

== See also ==
- 2022 in ONE Championship
- List of ONE Championship events
- List of current ONE fighters
