= Nidal Bchiri =

Belgian-Moroccan kickboxer

- Born: October 3, 1991 (age 35); Amsterdam, Netherlands
- Height: 1.91 m (6 ft 3 in)
- Weight: 120 kg (260 lb; 19 st)
- Style: Kickboxing
- Stance: Orthodox
- Fighting out of: Amsterdam, Netherlands; Belgium
- Team: Mike's Gym; Royal Gym; Hemmers Gym

Kickboxing record
- Total: 28
- Wins: 21
- By knockout: 6
- Losses: 6
- Draws: 1

Nidal Bchiri (born October 3, 1991) is a Dutch-Moroccan kickboxer. He is a former Enfusion Heavyweight Champion and currently competes in the heavyweight division of Glory.

As of July 2026 he was the #6 ranked Heavyweight kickboxer in the world by Beyond Kickboxing and #10 by Combat Press as of April 2026.

== Career ==
On September 15, 2018, Bchiri defeated Errol Zimmerman by knockout at Enfusion 70.

On April 13, 2019, Bchiri defeated Cristian Ristea by unanimous decision at Enfusion #82.

Bchiri took part in a 4-man Heavyweight qualifier tournament at the Enfusion 86 Road to Abu Dhabi event on June 28, 2019. In the semifinals he defeated Aissa Boualem by unanimous decision. In the final Bchiri lost to Rade Opačić by first-round knockout.

On September 17, 2022, Bchiri faced Martin Terpstra for the vacant Enfusion Heavyweight World Championship at Enfusion #110. He lost the fight by third-round knockout.

Bchiri rematched Sam Tevette on March 26, 2022, at Enfusion #105. He won by unanimous decision for the second time.

Bchiri challenged Levi Rigters at Enfusion 79 for his Enfusion Heavyweight World title on February 23, 2019. He lost the fight by a unanimous decision.

On February 29, 2020, Bchiri faced Muhammed Balli at Enfusion #95. He lost the fight by spliit decision.

On June 29, 2024, Bchiri took part in the K-1 World GP 2024 in Sarajevo. In the quarterfinals Bchiri faced Claudio Istrate, after three rounds the bout was judged a draw and an extension round was announced. Istrate as a protest to the result left the ring, leaving Bchiri the winner by default. In the semifinals he lost to Kadir Yildirim by split decision but was called back for the final as Yildirim was injured. In the final Bchiri lost to Miloš Cvjetićanin by second-round technical knockout.

Bchiri made his SENSHI debut at SENSHI 24, on December 7, 2024, taking on Giannis Stoforidis. He lost via KO in the second round, succumbing to low kicks.

Bchiri made his Glory Kickboxing debut at Glory 99, on April 5. 2025, as a part of the Opening Round of The Last Heavyweight Standing Tournament. He faced Asdren Gashi, losing via split decision.

On December 13, 2025, Bchiri faced Nico Pereira Horta at Glory Collision 8. He scored an upset win, stopping Horta in the first round after three knockdowns.

Bchiri returned at Glory 105, on February 7, 2026, taking Horta's place in the tournament, as he had not recovered from their fight. He took on former Glory Interim Heavyweight Champion Tariq Osaro. He lost the bout via TKO in the second round, absorbing a hard right cross from Cookie to end his night.

== Titles and accomplishments ==
- K-1
  - K-1 World GP 2024 in Sarajevo Runner-up
- Enfusion
  - 2024 Enfusion Heavyweight World Champion

== Fight record ==
Professional kickboxing record
21 Wins (6 (T)KO's), 6 Losses
Date	Result	Opponent	Event	Location	Method	Round	Time
2026-10-17	Win	(Algeria) Nordine Mahieddine	Glory 110	Antwerp, Belgium	KO (Body kick)	1	2:29
2026-02-07	Loss	(Nigeria) Tariq Osaro	Glory 105 - Last Heavyweight Standing Finals Tournament, Quarterfinals	Arnhem, Netherlands	KO (Right cross)	2	2:31
2025-12-13	Win	(Cape Verde) Nico Pereira Horta	Glory Collision 8	Arnhem, Netherlands	TKO (3 Knockdowns)	1	2:59
2025-04-05	Loss	(Albania) Asdren Gashi	Glory 99 - Last Heavyweight Standing, Opening Round	Rotterdam, Netherlands	Decision (Split)	3	3:00
2024-12-07	Loss	(Greece) Giannis Stoforidis	SENSHI 24	Varna, Bulgaria	KO (Low kicks)	2	1:55
2024-06-29	Loss	(Serbia) Miloš Cvjetićanin	K-1 World GP 2024 in Sarajevo, Final	Sarajevo, Bosnia and Herzegovina	TKO (Low kicks)	2	2:03
For the K-1 World GP 2024 in Sarajevo tournament title. Fails to qualify for K-1 World Grand Prix 2024 Final.
2024-06-29	Loss	(Turkey) Kadir Yildirim	K-1 World GP 2024 in Sarajevo, Semifinals	Sarajevo, Bosnia and Herzegovina	Decision (Split)	3	3:00
Bchiri advances to the final despite the loss due to an injury sustained by Yildirim.
2024-06-29	Win	(Italy) Claudio Istrate	K-1 World GP 2024 in Sarajevo, Quarterfinals	Sarajevo, Bosnia and Herzegovina	retirement (left the ring)	3	3:00
2024-05-18	Win	(Curaçao) Winfried Jops	Enfusion #137	Dordrecht, Netherlands	Decision (Unanimous)	5	3:00
Wins the vacant Enfusion Heavyweight World Championship.
2022-09-17	Loss	(Netherlands) Martin Terpstra	Enfusion #110	Alkmaar, Netherlands	KO (Right cross)	3	0:33
For the vacant Enfusion Heavyweight World Championship.
2022-03-26	Win	(Netherlands) Sam Tevette	Enfusion #105	Alkmaar, Netherlands	Decision (Unanimous)	3	3:00
2021-11-01	Loss	(Cape Verde) Nico Pereira Horta	Superkombat Universe	Dubai, UAE	Decision (Unanimous)	3	3:00
2021-07-10	Win	(Netherlands) Sam Tevette	Enfusion #101	Alkmaar, Netherlands	Decision (Unanimous)	3	3:00
2020-02-29	Loss	(Turkey) Muhammed Balli	Enfusion #95	Eindhoven, Netherlands	Decision (Split)	3	3:00
2019-12-06	Win	(Netherlands) Fred Sikking	Enfusion #92	Abu Dhabi, United Arab Emirates	Decision (Unanimous)	3	3:00
2019-06-28	Loss	(Serbia) Rade Opačić	Enfusion #86 - Road to Abu Dhabi, Final	Belgrade, Serbia	KO (Punches)	1	1:38
2019-06-28	Win	(France) Aissa Boualem	Enfusion #86 - Road to Abu Dhabi, Semifinals	Belgrade, Serbia	Decision	3	3:00
2019-04-13	Win	(Romania) Cristian Ristea	Enfusion #82	Orchies, France	Decision	3	3:00
2019-02-23	Loss	(Netherlands) Levi Rigters	Enfusion #79	Eindhoven, Netherlands	Decision (Unanimous)	5	3:00
For the Enfusion Heavyweight World Championship.
2018-11-	Win	(Turkey) Farsat Samaei	Kick Boks K1 Irfan Berme Alanya	Alanya, Turkey	Decision (Unanimous)	3	3:00
2018-09-15	Win	(Curaçao) Errol Zimmerman	Enfusion Live 70	Antwerp, Belgium	KO (Right hook)	3	
2018-05-12	Win	(Netherlands) Eldar Oliveira Garcia	Global Fights Holland I	The Hague, Netherlands	KO (Left hook)	3	
2018-03-03	Loss	(Netherlands) Jeffrey van Overbeek	Glory 51: Rotterdam	Rotterdam, Netherlands	Decision (Split)	3	3:00
2017-11-18	Win	(Albania) Luigj Gashi		Belgium	KO (High kick)	3	
Wins the Belgium K-1 B-class Heavyweight title.
2017-09-30	Win		Enfusion Live 53	Antwerp, Belgium	KO		
2017-	Win	(Morocco) Abderrahman Barkouch	Enfusion Talents	Antwerp, Belgium	Decision (Unanimous)	3	3:00
Legend: Win Loss Draw/No contest Notes
