= Martin Pacas =

Slovak kickboxer

- Born: May 14, 1991 (age 35); Trenčín, Czechoslovakia
- Nickname: Paco
- Height: 1.99 m (6 ft 6 1/2 in)
- Weight: 102 kg (225 lb; 16.1 st)
- Division: Heavyweight
- Style: Kickboxing, Muay Thai
- Fighting out of: Trenčín, Slovakia
- Team: NVR GYM
- Trainer: Peter Navrátil

Kickboxing record
- Total: 56
- Wins: 44
- By knockout: 15
- Losses: 12

Martin Pacas (born May 14, 1991) is a Slovak retired kickboxer. He is a former KOK Heavyweight champion and Enfusion Tournament Winner.

== Career ==
On November 30, 2013, Pacas entered the 2014 Tatneft Cup in the heavyweight division. In the first round of the tournament he defeated Ali Cenik by unanimous decision.

Pacas faced Gaetan Sautron in the seminfinals of a 4-man tournament at the Nitrianska Noc Bojovníkov event on March 1, 2014. he won the fight by split decision. In the final he faced Ivan Pavle who defeated him by unanimous decision.

On May 28, 2014, Pacas faced Igor Bugaenko in the quarterfinals of the 2014 Tatneft Cup. He lost the fight by extension round unanimous decision.

On October 3, 2015, Pacas Michal Reisseinger at the WKN - Simply the Best 6 event. He won the fight by decision.

Pacas faced Tomáš Hron at Enfusion Live 28 on April 25, 2015, in Žilina, Slovakia. He lost the fight by decision.

On February 20, 2016, Pacas entered a 4-man heavyweight tournament for the vacant WKN K-1 European Super Heavyweight title at Nitra Night of Fighters. In the semifinals he defeated Giorgos Mavrogiannis by decision. In the final he rematched Tomáš Možný and lost by unanimous decision.

Pacas entered a 4-man tournament at Enfusion Live 39 on April 23, 2016. In the semifinals he defeated Hicham Achalhi by majority decision. In the final he rematched Tomáš Hron and defeated him by extension round decision.

On June 18, 2016, Pacas faced Tarik Khbabez at W5 European League XXXV in Prievidza, Slovakia. He won the fight by second-round technical knockout.

On February 18, 2017, Pacas faced Ismael Lazaar at Enfusion Live 46. He won the fight by unanimous decision.

On September 4, 2017, Pacas faced Pavel Voronin at Tiger Night in Switzerland. He won the fight by decision.

On November 25, 2017, Pacas faced Arnold Oborotov for the vacant WKU Muay Thai World title at Diamond Fight Nights III. He won the fight by unanimous decision.

On April 28, 2018, Pacas faced Yurii Gorbenko at Enfusion 65. He won the fight by decision.

Pacas faced Levi Rigters for the Enfusion Super Heavyweight championship at Enfusion 73 on October 27, 2018. He lost the fight by unanimous decision.

Pacas entered an 8-man tournament at Kunlun Fight 80. He lost to Roman Kryklia by unanimous decision in the quarterfinals.

On November 9, 2019, Pacas faced Michał Turyński for the interim KOK Heavyweight title at KOK'79. He won the fight by unanimous decision.

Pacas entered the 2019 Abu Dhabi World Grand Prix, held at Enfusion 92 on December 6, 2019. He beat Rade Opačić by unanimous decision in the tournament semifinals. In the finals he lost to Levi Rigters by unanimous decision.

Pacas made his debut for the Glory promotion at Glory 77: Rotterdam on January 30, 2021, where he faced Muahmmed Balli. He won by knockout in the third round with a head kick.

On June 4, 2022, Pacas faced Nico Pereira Horta at KOK World Series 101. He won the fight by majority decision.

== Titles and accomplishments ==
- King of Kings
  - 2019 interim King of Kings Heavyweight Champion
- Enfusion
  - 2016 Enfusion Live Heavyweight Tournament Winner
- World Karate and Kickboxing Union
  - 2017 WKU Muay Thai World Heavyweight Champion
- World Kickboxing Federation
  - 2012 WKF K-1 World Heavyweight Champion

== Fight record ==
Professional Muay Thai & Kickboxing record
44 wins (15 (T)KOs), 12 losses, 0 draws
Date	Result	Opponent	Event	Location	Method	Round	Time
2023-10-28	Loss	(Suriname) Marciano Bhugwandass	KOK 116	Liptovský Mikuláš, Slovakia	Decision (Unanimous)	3	3:00
2022-12-09	Loss	(Turkey) Kadir Yildirim	Mega Fight Arena	Istanbul, Turkey	Decision (Unanimous)	3	3:00
2022-06-04	Win	(Cape Verde) Nico Pereira Horta	KOK World Series 101	Liptovský Mikuláš, Slovakia	Decision (Majority)	3	3:00
2021-01-30	Win	(Turkey) Muhammed Balli	Glory 77: Rotterdam	Rotterdam, Netherlands	KO (High kick + punches)	3	2:23
2019-12-06	Loss	(Netherlands) Levi Rigters	Enfusion 92, Final	Abu Dhabi, United Arab Emirates	Decision (Unanimous)	3	3:00
For the Enfusion Abu Dhabi World Grand Prix title.
2019-12-06	Win	(Serbia) Rade Opačić	Enfusion 92, Semi Final	Abu Dhabi, United Arab Emirates	Decision (Unanimous)	3	3:00
2019-11-09	Win	(Poland) Michał Turyński	KOK'79 in Slovakia	Liptovský Mikuláš, Slovakia	Decision (Unanimous)	3	3:00
Wins the interim KOK Heavyweight Championship.
2019-04-27	Win	(Serbia) Rade Opačić	Enfusion 83	Žilina, Slovakia	Decision (Unanimous)	3	3:00
2019-02-24	Loss	(Ukraine) Roman Kryklia	Kunlun Fight 80 - Heavyweight Tournament, Quarter Finals	Shanghai, China	Decision (Unanimous)	3	3:00
2018-12-01	Win	(Ukraine) Yurii Chornoivanenko	Enfusion 75	Třinec, Czech Republic	Decision (Unanimous)	3	3:00
2018-10-27	Loss	(Netherlands) Levi Rigters	Enfusion 73	Oberhausen, Germany	Decision (Unanimous)	5	3:00
For the vacant Enfusion Heavyweight World Championship.
2018-09-29	Win	(Netherlands) Thomas Bridgewater	KOK'38	Liptovský Mikuláš, Slovakia	Decision (Unanimous)	3	3:00
2018-04-28	Win	(Ukraine) Yurii Gorbenko	Enfusion 65	Žilina, Slovakia	TKO (Low kick)	1	
2018-03-09	Win	(Morocco) Hicham Achalhi	Enfusion 63	Abu Dhabi, United Arab Emirates	Decision (Unanimous)	5	3:00
2017-11-25	Win	(Lithuania) Arnold Oborotov	Diamonds Fight Night III	Liptovský Mikuláš, Slovakia	Decision (Unanimous)	5	3:00
Wins the vacant WKU Muay Thai World Heavyweight title.
2017-11-11	Win	(Aruba) Marcello Adriaansz	Enfusion Talents 40	Amsterdam, Netherlands	TKO (Corner stoppage)	2	1:26
2017-09-04	Win	(Moldova) Pavel Voronin	Tiger Night	Cologny, Switzerland	Decision	3	3:00
2017-05-06	Win	(Belgium) Thomas Vanneste	Enfusion Live 50	Žilina, Slovakia	TKO (Referee stoppage)	1	2:15
2017-02-18	Win	(Morocco) Ismael Lazaar	Enfusion Live 46	Eindhoven, Netherlands	Decision	3	3:00
2016-11-26	Win	(Italy) Luca Panto	Diamonds Fight Night III	Liptovský Mikuláš, Slovakia	KO	1	
2016-06-18	Win	(Morocco) Tarik Khbabez	W5 EUROPEAN LEAGUE XXXV	Prievidza, Slovakia	TKO (Left cross)	2	0:30
2016-04-23	Win	(Czech Republic) Tomáš Hron	Enfusion Live 39, Heavyweight Tournament Final	Žilina, Slovakia	Ext.R Decision	4	3:00
Wins the Enfusion Live Heavyweight Tournament.
2016-04-23	Win	(Morocco) Hicham Achalhi	Enfusion Live 39, Heavyweight Tournament Semi Final	Žilina, Slovakia	Decision (Majority)	3	3:00
2016-02-20	Loss	(Slovakia) Tomáš Možný	Nitra Night of Fighters, Final	Nitra, Slovakia	Decision (Unanimous)	3	3:00
For the vacant WKN K-1 European Super Heavyweight title.
2016-02-20	Win	(Greece) Giorgos Mavrogiannis	Nitra Night of Fighters, Semifinals	Nitra, Slovakia	Decision (Unanimous)	3	3:00
2015-12-12	Win	(Slovakia) Tomáš Možný	Diamonds Fight Night II	Liptovský Mikuláš, Slovakia	Ext.R Decision	4	3:00
2015-10-03	Win	(Czech Republic) Michal Reissinger	WKN - Simply the Best 6	Poprad, Slovakia	Decision	3	3:00
2015-05-30	Win	(Germany) Stefan Leko	Full Fight	Banská Bystrica, Slovakia	TKO (Punches)	1	
2015-04-25	Loss	(Czech Republic) Tomáš Hron	Enfusion Live 28	Žilina, Slovakia	Decision	3	3:00
2014-12-13	Win	(Poland) Michal Grzesiak		Liptovský Mikuláš, Slovakia	TKO	1	3:00
2014-09-13	Win	(Hungary) Tihamer Brunner	Muay Thai Evening 5	Trenčín, Slovakia	KO (Low kick)	2	
2014-05-28	Loss	(Belarus) Igor Bugaenko	Tatneft Cup 2014 - Tournament Quarter Finals	Kazan, Russia	Ext.R. Decision (Unanimous)	4	3:00
2014-03-01	Loss	(Slovakia) Ivan Pavle	Nitrianska Noc Bojovníkov, Final	Nitra, Slovakia	Decision (Unanimous)	3	3:00
2014-03-01	Win	(France) Gaetan Sautron	Nitrianska Noc Bojovníkov, Semi Final	Nitra, Slovakia	Decision (Split)	3	3:00
2013-11-30	Win	(Turkey) Ali Cenik	Tatneft Cup 2014 - Tournament First Round	Kazan, Russia	Ext.R. Decision (Unanimous)	4	3:00
2013-09-14	Win	(Ukraine) Roman Kryklia	Muay Thai Evening 3	Trenčín, Slovakia	Decision	3	3:00
2013-06-01	Win	(France) Rida Titri	Profiliga Muaythai 13	Banská Bystrica, Slovakia	Decision	3	3:00
2013-01-26	Win	(Czech Republic) Václav Pejsar	Muay Thai Evening 2	Trenčín, Slovakia	KO (High kick)	1	2:00
2012-10-	Win	(Switzerland) Muharrem Hasani			KO (Knee to the body)	2	
Wins the WKF K-1 World Heavyweight title.
2012-06-30	Win	(Slovakia) Ivan Bartek	Muay Thai Evening	Trenčín, Slovakia	Decision (Unanimous)	3	3:00
2011-11-19	Win	(Czech Republic) Petr Holubec	TCC 8, Tournament Final	Bamberg, Germany	Decision	3	3:00
2011-11-19	Win	(Croatia) Stefan Jelic	TCC 8, Tournament Semi Final	Bamberg, Germany	Decision	3	3:00
Legend: Win Loss Draw/No contest Notes

== Professional boxing record ==
1 fight	0 wins	1 loss
By knockout	0	1

No.	Result	Record	Opponent	Type	Round, time	Date	Location	Notes
1	Loss	0–1	(Poland) Marcin Najman	TKO	2 (6)	7 Jun 2013	Hala Lodowa MOSiR, Oświęcim, Poland	

== See also ==
- List of male kickboxers
