= Daniel Škvor =

Czech kickboxer and boxer (born 1989)

- Born: April 7, 1989 (age 37); Prague, Czech Republic
- Other names: DeeDee
- Height: 1.94 m (6 ft 4 1/2 in)
- Weight: 93 kg (205 lb; 14.6 st)
- Division: Light heavyweight (MMA)
- Style: Kickboxing
- Stance: Orthodox
- Fighting out of: Prague, Czech Republic
- Team: Reinders MMA
- Trainer: André Reinders

Professional boxing record
- Total: 2
- Wins: 2
- By knockout: 2

Kickboxing record
- Total: 38
- Wins: 26
- By knockout: 19
- Losses: 10
- By knockout: 5
- Draws: 2

Mixed martial arts record
- Total: 16
- Wins: 11
- By knockout: 6
- By submission: 3
- By decision: 2
- Losses: 5
- By knockout: 1
- By submission: 4

Other information
- Mixed martial arts record from Sherdog

Daniel Škvor is a Czech mixed martial artist, former kickboxer and boxer, currently competing in the Light heavyweight division of Oktagon MMA. He is a former kickboxing world champion, having held the WAKO Pro Super Heavyweight K-1 World Championship in 2017.

== Kickboxing career ==
=== Early career ===
Škvor was scheduled to face Radim Kušnirak at Enfusion Series on December 30, 2011. He won the fight by a first-round technical knockout.

Škvor was scheduled to face Tomasz Sarara at Battles of The Dragons 6 on April 21, 2012. He lost the fight by a second-round technical knockout. Škvor rebounded from his loss to Sarara with a decision victory against Jakub Hučko at Noc Bojovníku Chrudim on December 1, 2012.

He was scheduled to face Piotr Sebastian Lepich at Simply The Best 4 on May 24, 2014. He won by a first-round knockout. He furthermore beat Kiana Bomolo by a first-round technical knockout at Noc válečníků 9 on November 12, 2014, and Piotr Ramankevich by unanimous decision at Heroes Gate 14 on April 10, 2015.

Škvor was scheduled to face Antonio Plazibat at FFC 19 - Linz on September 18, 2015. He lost the fight by a second-round technical knockout.

In early 2016, Škvor returned to the Czech-based promotion Heroes Gate. He was scheduled to face Andrija Lekic at Heroes Gate 16 on March 18, 2016, and won the fight by unanimous decision. Škvor was afterwards scheduled to face Adnan Rezovič at Heroes Gate 17 on October 27, 2016. He won by unanimous decision. These two victories with the promotion earned him the right to fight David Vinš for the Heroes Gate World Championship -98 kg title at Heroes Gate 18: Final Fight on February 24, 2017. He won the fight by unanimous decision, after an extra round was fought.

Škvor was scheduled to face Stefan Andjelkovic for the WAKO Pro World K-1 Super Heavyweight Championship at Yangames on September 30, 2017. He won the fight by a third-round technical knockout.

=== Glory ===
Škvor was scheduled to make his Glory debut against Tomáš Možný at Glory 51: Rotterdam on March 3, 2018. Mozny won the fight by unanimous decision.

Briefly moving away from Glory, Škvor was scheduled to defend his WAKO Pro title against Roman Kryklia at Monte-Carlo Fighting Trophy on June 30, 2018. Kryklia won the fight by a second-round knockout.

Škvor was scheduled to face the K-1 heavyweight champion Roel Mannaart at Glory 59: Amsterdam on September 29, 2018. Mannaart won the fight by unanimous decision.

Škvor was scheduled to face D'Angelo Marshall at Glory 64: Strasbourg on March 9, 2019. Marshall won the fight by a third-round knockout.

Škvor was scheduled to face Levi Kuyken The Heroes Gate 23 on December 19, 2019. He won the fight by a second-round knockout.

== Mixed martial arts career ==
=== Oktagon MMA ===
Škvor made his mixed martial arts debut against Oumar Sy at Oktagon 20 on December 30, 2020. He lost the fight by a second-round rear-naked choke.

Škvor was scheduled to face Ilya Lupinov at Oktagon 26 on July 24, 2021. He won the fight by a first-round technical knockout.

Škvor faced Jhonathan Azevedo at Oktagon 30 on 30 December 2021. He won the fight by a first-round technical knockout.

Škvor was booked to face Pavol Langer at Oktagon 32 on April 9, 2022. He won the fight by unanimous decision.

Škvor faced Panagiotis Stroumpoulis at Oktagon 34 on July 23, 2022. He won the fight by a first-round technical knockout.

Škvor faced Jorick Montagnac at Oktagon 38 on December 30, 2022. He lost the fight by technical knockout, just 38 seconds into the opening round.

== Championships and accomplishments ==
- World Association of Kickboxing Organizations
  - 2017 WAKO Pro Super Heavyweight (94.2 kg) K-1 World Championship
- Heroes Gate
  - 2017 Heroes Gate World Heavyweight (+98 kg) Championship

== Mixed martial arts record ==
Professional record breakdown
16 matches	11 wins	5 losses
By knockout	6	1
By submission	3	4
By decision	2	0

Res.	Record	Opponent	Method	Event	Date	Round	Time	Location	Notes
Loss	11–5	Tomasz Narkun	Submission (rear-naked choke)	Oktagon 95	October 17, 2026	1	2:29	Karlovy Vary, Czech Republic	Return to Light Heavyweight.
Win	11–4	Patrick Vespaziani	Technical Submission (guillotine choke)	Oktagon 81	December 28, 2025	2	3:16	Prague, Czech Republic	Heavyweight debut.
Win	10–4	Lucas Alsina	TKO (elbow and punches)	Oktagon 72	June 14, 2025	2	4:39	Prague, Czech Republic	
Win	9–4	Marc Doussis	KO (punch)	Oktagon 70	April 26, 2025	1	1:51	Karlovy Vary, Czech Republic	Catchweight (207.6 lb) bout; Doussis missed weight.
Win	8–4	Antonio Zovak	Submission (guillotine choke)	Oktagon 67	February 22, 2025	1	0:26	Třinec, Czech Republic	
Loss	7–4	Will Fleury	Submission (arm-triangle choke)	Oktagon 56	April 20, 2024	2	1:14	Birmingham, England	
Win	7–3	Martin Zawada	Decision (unanimous)	Oktagon 51	December 29, 2023	3	5:00	Prague, Czech Republic	
Win	6–3	Nermin Hajdarpašić	Submission (guillotine choke)	Oktagon 45	29 July 2023	1	1:40	Prague, Czech Republic	
Loss	5–3	Dan Vinni	Submission (heel hook)	Oktagon 41	15 April 2023	1	1:20	Liberec, Czech Republic	
Loss	5–2	Jorick Montagnac	TKO (punches)	Oktagon 38	30 December 2022	1	0:38	Prague, Czech Republic	
Win	5–1	Panagiotis Stroumpoulis	TKO (knee and punches)	Oktagon 34	23 July 2022	1	0:49	Prague, Czech Republic	
Win	4–1	Pavol Langer	Decision (unanimous)	Oktagon 32	9 April 2022	3	5:00	Ostrava, Czech Republic	
Win	3–1	Jhonathan Azevedo	TKO (punches)	Oktagon 30	30 December 2021	1	5:00	Prague, Czech Republic	
Win	2–1	Martin Horsky	TKO (punches)	Heroes Gate 24	15 October 2021	1	1:05	Prague, Czech Republic	
Win	1–1	Ilya Lupinov	TKO (punches)	Oktagon 26	24 July 2021	1	1:24	Prague, Czech Republic	
Loss	0–1	Oumar Sy	Submission (rear-naked choke)	Oktagon 20	30 December 2020	2	4:35	Brno, Czech Republic	Light Heavyweight debut.

== Kickboxing record ==
Professional Kickboxing Record
26 Wins (19 (T)KO's), 10 Losses, 2 Draw, 0 No Contest
Date	Result	Opponent	Event	Location	Method	Round	Time
2019-12-19	Win	(Belgium) Levi Kuyken	Heroes Gate 23	Prague, Czech Republic	KO	2	
2019-07-25	Loss	(Czech Republic) David Vinš	Yangames Fight Night Žluté lázně, Tournament Finals	Prague, Czech Republic	KO (Left hook)	1	
For the Yangames Heavyweight (+91 kg) Tournament title.
2019-07-25	Win	(Poland) Michal Turinsky	Yangames Fight Night Žluté lázně, Tournament Semifinals	Prague, Czech Republic	Decision (Unanimous)	3	3:00
2019-07-25	Win	(Austria) Thomas Froschauer	Yangames Fight Night Žluté lázně, Tournament Quarterfinals	Prague, Czech Republic	TKO (Corner stoppage)	3	
2019-05-24	Win	(Czech Republic) David Vicena	Heroes Gate 22	Prague, Czech Republic	KO	1	
2019-03-09	Loss	(Curaçao) D'Angelo Marshall	Glory 64: Strasbourg	Strasbourg, France	KO	3	1:43
2018-09-29	Loss	(Netherlands) Roel Mannaart	Glory 59: Amsterdam	Amsterdam, Netherlands	Decision (Unanimous)	3	3:00
2018-06-30	Loss	(Ukraine) Roman Kryklia	Monte-Carlo Fighting Trophy	Monaco	KO	2	
Loses the WAKO Pro World K-1 Championship +94.2 kg.
2018-03-03	Loss	(Slovakia) Tomáš Možný	Glory 51: Rotterdam	Rotterdam, Netherlands	Decision (Unanimous)	3	3:00
2017-09-30	Win	(Serbia) Stefan Andjelkovic	Yangames	Prague, Czech Republic	TKO	3	
Wins the WAKO Pro World K-1 Championship +94.2 kg.
2017-02-24	Win	(Czech Republic) David Vinš	Heroes Gate 18: Final Fight	Prague, Czech Republic	Ext. R. Decision	4	3:00
Wins the Heroes Gate World Championship -98 kg.
2016-12-30	Win	(Bosnia and Herzegovina) Ahmed Krnjić	Box Lucerna	Prague, Czech Republic	KO (Uppercut)	1	
2016-10-27	Win	(Bosnia and Herzegovina) Adnan Rezovič	Heroes Gate 17	Prague, Czech Republic	Decision (Unanimous)	3	3:00
2016-07-28	Win	(Croatia) Igor Mihaljević	Yangame's Fight Night 2016	Prague, Czech Republic	TKO	1	
2016-03-18	Win	(Croatia) Andrija Lekic	Heroes Gate 16	Prague, Czech Republic	Decision (Unanimous)	3	3:00
2015-12-19	Win	(Poland) Patrik Zdrojewsky	Večer bojovníků thajského boxu Jesenice	Prague, Czech Republic	Decision (Unanimous)	3	3:00
2015-10-23	Win	(Czech Republic) Jiří Havránek	Heroes Gate 15	Prague, Czech Republic	TKO	3	
2015-09-18	Loss	(Croatia) Antonio Plazibat	FFC 19 - Linz	Linz, Austria	TKO (Three Knockdowns)	2	2:42
2015-04-10	Win	(Belarus) Piotr Ramankevich	Heroes Gate 14	Prague, Czech Republic	Decision (Unanimous)	3	3:00
2014-11-12	Win	(France) Kiana Bomolo	Noc válečníků 9	Kladno, Czech Republic	TKO (Retirement)	1	3:00
2014-05-24	Win	(Poland) Piotr Sebastian Lepich	Simply The Best 4	Prague, Czech Republic	KO (Uppercut)	1	
2013-05-19	Win	(Croatia) Manuel Smoljan	Heroes Gate 10	Prague, Czech Republic	TKO (Referee stoppage)	3	
2012-12-01	Win	(Czech Republic) Jakub Hučko	Noc Bojovníku Chrudim	Prague, Czech Republic	Decision (Unanimous)	3	3:00
2012-04-21	Loss	(Poland) Tomasz Sarara	Battles of The Dragons 6	Pomiechówek, Poland	TKO (Punches)	2	2:42
2011-12-30	Win	(Czech Republic) Radim Kušnirak	Enfusion Series	Prague, Czech Republic	TKO (Three knockdowns)	1	1:39
2011-06-30	Win	(Czech Republic) Petr Kareš	Superliga Sasazu	Prague, Czech Republic			
Legend: Win Loss Draw/No contest Notes

== Professional boxing record ==
Key to abbreviations used for results
DQ	Disqualification	RTD	Corner retirement
KO	Knockout	SD	Split decision / split draw
MD	Majority decision / majority draw	TD	Technical decision / technical draw
NC	No contest	TKO	Technical knockout
PTS	Points decision	UD	Unanimous decision / unanimous draw

Boxing record
No.	Result	Record	Opponent	Type	Round(s), time	Date	Location	Notes
2	Win	2–0	(Poland) Piotr Rzyman	TKO	1 (6), 2:20	24 May 2019	Arena Sparta, Prague, Czech Republic	
1	Win	1–0	(Czech Republic) Petr Frohlich	RTD	1 (4)	30 Dec 2018	Lucerna Hall, Prague, Czech Republic	

== See also ==
- List of male kickboxers
