= Levi Rigters =

Dutch kickboxer (born 1995)

- Born: July 12, 1995 (age 31); Abcoude, Netherlands
- Nickname: The Judge
- Height: 2.02 m (6 ft 7 1/2 in)
- Weight: 111.3 kg (245 lb; 18 st)
- Division: Heavyweight
- Reach: 80 in (200 cm)
- Style: Kickboxing
- Team: ARJ Trainingen (2024-present)
- Trainer: Maikel Polanen

Kickboxing record
- Total: 33
- Wins: 28
- By knockout: 15
- Losses: 5

Mixed martial arts record
- Total: 1
- Wins: 1
- By knockout: 1
- Losses: 0

Other information
- Spouse: June Mirit Sier
- Children: 2

Levi Rigters (born July 12, 1995) is a Dutch kickboxer currently signed with Glory, where he competes in the heavyweight division. He is a former Enfusion Heavyweight Champion and 2020 Glory 76 Heavyweight Tournament winner.

He is ranked as the tenth best heavyweight by Combat Press as of September 2022, and seventh best by Beyond Kickboxing as of October 2022.

== Kickboxing career ==
=== Enfusion ===
Rigters made his promotional debut with Enfusion in 2017 against Serkan Ozcaglayan. Rigters won the fight by a unanimous decision. During WFL: Manhoef vs. Bonjasky he fought Redouan Cairo. Rigters won the fight by a first-round TKO. During Enfusion 63 Rigters defeated Bruno Susano by a second-round TKO.

Rigters faced Martin Pacas for the Enfusion Super Heavyweight championship at Enfusion 73 on October 27, 2018. Rigters won the title by a unanimous decision.

Rigters continued his undefeated streak with non-title wins over Mihajlo Kecojevic at Enfusion 86, on June 28, 2019, and Dexter Suisse at Enfusion 88 on October 5, 2019.

Rigters made his first heavyweight title defense against Nidal Bchiri at Enfusion 79 on February 23, 2020. He won the fight by a unanimous decision.

Levi Rigters then entered the 2019 Abu Dhabi World Grand Prix, held at Enfusion 92 on December 6, 2019. He beat Giannis Stoforidis by unanimous decision in the tournament semifinals, and in the finals he defeated Martin Pacas by unanimous decision as well.

=== Glory ===
Rigters was scheduled to make his Glory debut at Glory 76 on December 12, 2020. He was to take part in a four-man heavyweight tournament, facing the #5 ranked heavyweight Antonio Plazibat in the semi-finals. The tournament parings later changed, as Arkadiusz Wrzose pulled out of the tournament. Righters was rescheduled to face Jahfarr Wilnis. His opponent changed once more, with Wilnis being replaced by Massinissa Hamaili. The event was indefinitely postponed, as main event fighter Badr Hari contracted COVID-19, as well as due to a partial lockdown imposed by the Dutch government. The event was rescheduled for December 19. Hamaili would later be replaced by Marciano Bhagwandass, four days before the event. Rigters won the tournament, knocking out Marciano Bhagwandass with a body shot in the second round of the semifinal bout, and Nordine Mahieddine by a body kick in the first round of the tournament final.

Rigters took part in a four-man heavyweight tournament at Glory 77 on January 30, 2021, facing Tarik Khbabez in the semifinals, as a late notice replacement for Antonio Plazibat. Despite coming into the fight as a favorite, Rigters would lose the fight by split decision.

Rigters was booked to fight the #10 ranked Glory heavyweight Tomáš Možný at Glory 78: Arnhem on September 4, 2021. He won the fight by a third-round technical knockout, stopping his opponent with low kicks.

Rigters was expected to face the two-time Glory heavyweight title challenger Jamal Ben Saddik at Glory 80 on March 19, 2022. The bout was cancelled minutes before starting, due to riots breaking out in the crowd. Rigters was next booked to face Tariq Osaro at Glory: Collision 4 on October 8, 2022. He won the fight by unanimous decision, with all five judges scoring the bout 29–28 in his favor.

Rigters was expected to face Martin Terpstra, in a special qualifier for the Glory Heavyweight Grand Prix, at Glory 89 on October 7, 2023. Terpstra withdrew from the fight on the day of the bout and was replaced by Ion Taburceanu.

Rigters faced Uku Jürjendal in the quarterfinals of the Glory Heavyweight Grand Prix on March 9, 2024. He won the fight by a second-round knockout. Rigters overcame Bahram Rajabzadeh by unanimous decision in the semifinals of the one-day tournament, but suffered a second-round technical loss at the hands of Rico Verhoeven in the finals.

Rigters was expected to face Jahfarr Wilnis at Glory 92 on May 18, 2024. Wilnis withdrew from the fight for undisclosed reasons on May 8, 2024, and was replaced by Nico Pereira Horta. Rigters won the fight by unanimous decision.

Rigters was expected to face Antonio Plazibat at Glory 95 on September 21, 2024. Plazibat withdrew from the bout on August 19, 2024, due to an elbow injury. Rigters was rescheduled to face Bahram Rajabzadeh at the same event.

Rigters challenged Rico Verhoeven for Glory heavyweight title in a rematch at Collision 7 on December 7, 2024, at the GelreDome in Arnhem, Netherlands. He lost via unanimous decision, both dropping and getting dropped by Verhoeven throughout the course of the fight.

Rigters returned at Glory 103, facing Jamal Ben Saddik in the opening round of the second phase of the "Last Heavyweight Standing" Tournament. He won via TKO in the third round, dropping Ben Saddik with a spinning back kick to the body.

Rigters faced Asadulla Nasipov in the semifinals of the Last Heavyweight Standing Qualification Round Phase 2 one-night tournament at Glory 104 - Last Heavyweight Standing Qualification Round on October 11, 2025. He won the fight by unanimous decision and advanced the to finals where he faced Sofian Laidouni. He lost the fight by unanimous decision.

== Titles and accomplishments ==
- RINGSLEAGUE
  - 2016 RINGSLEAGUE Heavyweight Champion
- Enfusion
  - Enfusion World Super Heavyweight Champion (One time; former)
    - One successful title defense
  - 2019 Abu Dhabi World Grand Prix Champion
- Glory
  - 2020 Glory Heavyweight Tournament Winner
  - 2024 Glory Heavyweight Grand Prix Runner-up
  - 2024 Glory Breakout Fighter of the Year

Awards

- 2024 Combat Press Fight of the Year (vs Rico Verhoeven II)

== Mixed martial arts record ==
Professional record breakdown
1 match	1 win	0 losses
By knockout	1	0

Res.	Record	Opponent	Method	Event	Date	Round	Time	Location	Notes
Win	1–0	Luis Carlos de Brito	TKO (spinning back kick and punches)	Levels Fight League 24	September 26, 2026	1	0:45	Den Bosch, Netherlands	Heavyweight debut.

== Kickboxing record ==
Kickboxing record
28 Wins (15 (T)KOs), 5 Losses, 0 Draws
Date	Result	Opponent	Event	Location	Method	Round	Time
2025-10-11	Loss	(France) Sofian Laidouni	Glory 104 - Last Heavyweight Standing Qualification Round, Final	Rotterdam, Netherlands	Decision (Unanimous)	3	3:00
Fails to qualify for the 2025 Glory Last Heavyweight Standing - Final Tournament.
2025-10-11	Win	(Russia) Asadulla Nasipov	Glory 104 - Last Heavyweight Standing Qualification Round, Semifinals	Rotterdam, Netherlands	KO (High knee)	3	0:36
2025-08-23	Win	(Morocco) Jamal Ben Saddik	Glory 103 - Last Heavyweight Standing Opening Round Phase 2	Rotterdam, Netherlands	KO (Spinning back kick to the body)	3	1:41
2024-12-07	Loss	(Netherlands) Rico Verhoeven	Glory Collision 7	Arnhem, Netherlands	Decision (Unanimous)	5	3:00
For the Glory Heavyweight Championship.
2024-09-21	Win	(Azerbaijan) Bahram Rajabzadeh	Glory 95	Zagreb, Croatia	TKO (Doctor stoppage)	3	2:23
Glory Heavyweight title eliminator.
2024-05-18	Win	(Cape Verde) Nico Pereira Horta	Glory 92	Rotterdam, Netherlands	Decision (Unanimous)	3	3:00
2024-03-09	Loss	(Netherlands) Rico Verhoeven	Glory Heavyweight Grand Prix, Final	Arnhem, Netherlands	TKO (4 Knockdowns)	2	2:59
For the 2024 Glory Heavyweight Grand Prix title.
2024-03-09	Win	(Azerbaijan) Bahram Rajabzadeh	Glory Heavyweight Grand Prix, Semifinals	Arnhem, Netherlands	Decision (Unanimous)	3	3:00
2024-03-09	Win	(Estonia) Uku Jürjendal	Glory Heavyweight Grand Prix, Quarterfinals	Arnhem, Netherlands	KO (Punch)	2	1:52
2023-10-07	Win	(Moldova) Ion Taburceanu	Glory 89	Burgas, Bulgaria	KO (Low kicks)	1	1:55
Qualifies for the 2024 Glory Heavyweight Grand Prix.
2022-10-08	Win	(Nigeria) Tariq Osaro	Glory: Collision 4	Arnhem, Netherlands	Decision (Unanimous)	3	3:00
2021-09-04	Win	(Slovakia) Tomáš Možný	Glory 78: Arnhem	Arnhem, Netherlands	TKO (Low kicks)	3	1:02
2021-01-30	Loss	(Morocco) Tarik Khbabez	Glory 77: Rotterdam Semi-final	Rotterdam, Netherlands	Decision (Majority)	3	3:00
2020-12-19	Win	(France) Nordine Mahieddine	Glory 76: Rotterdam, Final	Rotterdam, Netherlands	KO (Front kick)	1	1:49
Wins the 2020 Glory Heavyweight Tournament.
2020-12-19	Win	(Suriname) Marciano Bhugwandass	Glory 76: Rotterdam, Semi-final	Rotterdam, Netherlands	KO (Body punch)	2	2:42
2019-12-06	Win	(Slovakia) Martin Pacas	Enfusion 92, Final	Abu Dhabi, United Arab Emirates	Decision (Unanimous)	3	3:00
Wins the Enfusion Abu Dhabi World Grand Prix.
2019-12-06	Win	(Greece) Giannis Stoforidis	Enfusion 92, Semi-final	Abu Dhabi, United Arab Emirates	Decision (Unanimous)	3	3:00
2019-02-23	Win	(Morocco) Nidal Bchiri	Enfusion 79	Eindhoven, Netherlands	Decision (Unanimous)	5	3:00
Defends the Enfusion Heavyweight World Championship.
2019-10-05	Win	(Netherlands) Dexter Suisse	Enfusion #88	Dordrecht, Netherlands	KO (Right hook)	2	2:42
2019-06-28	Win	(Serbia) Mihajlo Kecojevic	Enfusion #86	Belgrade, Serbia	Decision (Unanimous)	3	3:00
2018-10-27	Win	(Slovakia) Martin Pacas	Enfusion 73	Oberhausen, Germany	Decision (Unanimous)	5	3:00
Wins the vacant Enfusion Heavyweight World Championship.
2018-03-09	Win	(Portugal) Bruno Susano	Enfusion 63	Abu Dhabi, United Arab Emirates	KO (Knees and Punches)	2	
2017-10-29	Win	(Suriname) Redouan Cairo	WFL: Manhoef vs. Bonjasky, Final 16	Almere, Netherlands	TKO (3 Knockdowns Rule)	1	1:55
2017-04-29	Win	(Turkey) Serkan Ozcaglayan	Enfusion Live x Fightsense	Zoetermeer, Netherlands	Decision (Unanimous)	3	3:00
2016-11-19	Win	(Netherlands) Semmie Onojaife	RINGS Fighting Network, Final	Aalsmeer, Netherlands	KO (Punches)	4	
Wins RINGSLEAGUE Heavyweight title.
2016-11-19	Win	(Netherlands) Perry Reichling	RINGS Fighting Network, Semi-final	Aalsmeer, Netherlands	Decision	3	3:00
2016-10-01	Win	(Netherlands) Semmie Onojaife	RINGS Fighting Network, Quarter-final	Nieuwegein, Netherlands	TKO (Punches)	2	
2016-06-04	Win	(Cape Verde) Nico Pereira Horta	King of the Ring, Final	Westervoort, Netherlands	Decision	3	3:00
Wins King of the Ring B-class Heavyweight Tournament.
2016-06-04	Win	(Netherlands)	King of the Ring, Semifinals	Westervoort, Netherlands	Decision	3	3:00
2016-05-16	Win	(Netherlands) Arthur King	Fightclub Den Haag	Den Haag, Netherlands	TKO (Ref. stoppage)	1	
2016-04-30	Win	(Turkey) Fatih Cimic	Öncü Fight Club	Istanbul, Turkey	TKO (Punches + knee)	2	
2016-02-28	Win	(Turkey) Cihad Kepenek	Anadolu Arena 9	Tokat, Turkey	Decision (Unanimous)	3	3:00
2015-12-06	Win	(Morocco) Abderrahman Barkouch	Real Fighters	Netherlands	Decision	3	3:00
2015-10-17	Loss	(Netherlands) Roel Mannaart	Ultimate Kickboxing	Hoogeveen, Netherlands	Decision	3	3:00
2015-09-26	Win	(Netherlands) Eldar Oliveira Garcia	Back to the Old Skool II	Amsterdam, Netherlands	Decision	3	3:00
Legend: Win Loss Draw/No contest Notes

== See also ==
- List of male kickboxers
