= Igor Bugaenko =

Belarusian kickboxer

- Born: 1981 (age 44–45); Minsk, Belarus
- Nationality: Belarusian
- Height: 1.82 m (5 ft 11 1/2 in)
- Weight: 93 kg (205 lb; 14.6 st)
- Division: Cruiserweight
- Style: Muay Thai, kickboxing
- Stance: Orthodox
- Fighting out of: Minsk, Belarus
- Team: Gridin Gym
- Years active: 2008 - present

Kickboxing record
- Total: 81
- Wins: 68
- By knockout: 29
- Losses: 13
- By knockout: 5
- Draws: 0

Igor Bugaenko (born 1981), also known as Ihar Buhaenka, is a Belarusian kickboxer, who has been professionally competing since 2008.

He is the former SUPERKOMBAT Cruiserweight Champion, and two-time Tatneft Arena World Cup winner, in 2008 and 2014.

He was ranked as a top ten middleweight between March 2015 and July 2021.

== Kickboxing career ==
=== Tatneft Cup winner ===
Bugaenko began his professional career with Tatneft Cup, entering both the 2008 and 2009 edition of the tournament. He won the 2008 edition with a first-round TKO of Elvin Abbasov in the finals, but lost both the semifinal bout against Semen Shelepov and the 3rd place fight against Sergei Lascenko in the 2009 edition. After losing to Lascenko, Bugaenko went on the worst run of his career, losing five of his next seven fights, four times by stoppage. This poor run of form was snapped at the Tatneft Cup 2013 event, when he scored a first round knockout of Eduardo Maiorino.

=== SUPERKOMBAT Fighting Championship ===
He defeated Lorenzo Javier Jorge on November 9, 2013 in a SUPERKOMBAT Cruiserweight Title Eliminator bout and challenged Bogdan Stoica for his Cruiserweight Championship. Fight happened at the SUPERKOMBAT World Grand Prix 2013 Final in Galați, Romania on December 21, and Bugaenko won the title after three round by unanimous judges decision.

Bugaenko earned a place in the 2014 Tatneft Arena Middleweight tournament with decision wins over Vladimir Toktasynov and Martin Pacas in the 1/8 and quarterfinals respectively. He won the semifinal bout against Valentin Slavikovskiy and the final bout against Alexander Vezhevatov in the same manner - by an extra round decision.

=== Win in Croatia ===
During the Obračun u Ringu 13 event, Bugaenko participated in the VVWS 95 kg elimination tournament. He defeated Stefan Anđelković by unanimous decision in the semifinals and Pacôme Assi by TKO in the finals, to earn a place in the main VVWS tournament. Bugaenko faced Claudiu Istrate in the semifinals of the main tournament, and won the fight by unanimous decision. He won the tournament title with a first-round stoppage of Alexandru Burduja.

=== Absolute Championship Berkut ===
After this tournament win, Bugaenko his next seven fights, all by decision, including notable victories against Redouan Cairo, Luis Tavares, Hicham El Gaoui and Freddy Kemayo. At ACB KB 15, he fought Artem Levin for the inaugural ACB KB Middleweight title. Levin won the fight by decision.

=== Later career ===
After his failed title bid, Bugaenko was scheduled to fight Mikhail Chalykh at Zhara Fight Show. He won the fight by decision. At the October 2019 Fair Fight event, he lost to César Almeida by an extra round decision.

== Championships and accomplishments ==
=== Kickboxing ===
- SUPERKOMBAT Fighting Championship
  - SUPERKOMBAT Cruiserweight Championship -92 kg/202.8 lb (one time; current)
- Tatneft Cup
  - Tatneft Arena World Cup 2014 (+80 kg) winner
  - Tatneft Arena World Cup 2008 (+80 kg) winner
- Venum Victory World Series
  - 2015 VVWS -95 kg Tournament Champion
  - 2015 VVWS -95 kg Elimination Tournament Champion

== Kickboxing record ==
Kickboxing record
68 wins (29 KOs), 13 losses
Date	Result	Opponent	Event	Location	Method	Round
2019-10-26	Loss	(Brazil) César Almeida	Fair Fight	Russia	Extra round decision	4
2018-05-30	Win	(Russia) Mikhail Chalykh	Zhara Fight Show	Moscow, Russia	Decision	3
2018-04-20	Loss	(Russia) Artem Levin	ACB KB 15: Grand Prix Kitek	Moscow, Russia	Decision	5
For the ACB KB Middleweight Title.
2018-02-24	Win	(France) Freddy Kemayo	ACB KB 13: From Paris with war	France	Decision (unanimous)	3
2017-10-07	Win	(China) Hao Guanghua	Wu Lin Feng	Zhengzhou, China	Decision	3
2017-07-15	Win	(Morocco) Hicham El Gaoui	ACB KB 10: Russia vs. China	Moscow, Russia	Decision (unanimous)	3
2016-12-10	Win	(Moldova) Maxim Bolotov	KOK World GP in Moldova Vol. 42	Chișinău, Moldova	Decision (unanimous)	3
2016-10-16	Win	(Cape Verde) Luis Tavares	ACB KB 8: Only The Braves	Hoofddorp, Netherlands	Decision	4
2016-06-04	Win	(Suriname) Redouan Cairo	ACB KB 6: Battle in Brussels	Brussels, Belgium	Decision	3
2016-04-16	Win	(Portugal) Bruno Susano	Oktagon 2016: Turin	Turin, Italy	Decision (unanimous)	3
2015-11-28	Win	(Moldova) Alexandru Burduja	Venum Victory World Series 2015	Paris, France	TKO	1
Wins VVWS 2015 -95 kg Tournament Title.
2015-11-28	Win	(Romania) Claudiu Istrate	Venum Victory World Series 2015	Paris, France	Decision (unanimous)	3
2015-07-30	Loss	(Czech Republic) Tomáš Hron	Yangame's Fight Night 3	Prague, Czech Republic	Decision (unanimous)	3
2015-05-30	Win	(France) Pacôme Assi	Obračun u Ringu 13, Final	Split, Croatia	TKO (retirement)	1
Wins VVWS -95 kg Elimination Tournament Title.
2015-05-30	Win	(Serbia) Stefan Anđelković	Obračun u Ringu 13, Semi Finals	Split, Croatia	Decision (unanimous)	3
2015-04-10	Loss	(Czech Republic) Ondřej Hutník	Heroes Gate 14	Prague, Czech Republic	Decision (unanimous)	3
2015-02-01	Loss	(Netherlands) Hesdy Gerges	Kunlun Fight 19: The Return of the King	Guangzhou, China	TKO	2
2014-09-13	Win	(Russia) Alexander Vezhevatov	Tatneft Cup 2014 final	Kazan, Russia	Ex. R. decision (unanimous)	4
Wins Tatneft Arena World Cup 2014 (+80 kg) title.
2014-07-18	Win	(Belarus) Valentin Slavikovskiy	Tatneft Cup 2014 1/2 final	Kazan, Russia	Ex. R. decision (unanimous)	4
2014-05-28	Win	(Slovakia) Martin Pacas	Tatneft Cup 2014 - 2nd selection 1/4 final	Kazan, Russia	Ex. R. decision (unanimous)	4
2014-03-22	Win	(Spain) Moises Baute	FCK	Tenerife, Spain	Decision (unanimous)	3
2014-03-01	Loss	(Slovakia) Ivan Pavle	Nitrianska Noc Bojovnikov 2014, Semi Finals	Nitra, Slovakia	Decision (unanimous)	3
2014-02-15	Win	(Germany) Vladimir Toktasynov	Tatneft Cup 2014 - 3rd selection 1/8 final	Kazan, Russia	Ex. R. decision	4
2013-12-21	Win	(Romania) Bogdan Stoica	SUPERKOMBAT World Grand Prix 2013 Final	Galați, Romania	Decision (unanimous)	3
Wins SUPERKOMBAT Cruiserweight Championship.
2013-11-09	Win	(Spain) Jorge Loren	SUPERKOMBAT World Grand Prix 2013 Final Elimination	Ploiești, Romania	Decision (unanimous)	3
SUPERKOMBAT Cruiserweight Title Eliminator.
2013-02-22	Win	(Ukraine) Vladimir Oleynik	Knockout Show (Muaythai Night)	Moscow, Russia	Decision (unanimous)	3
2012-12-01	Win	(Brazil) Eduardo Maiorino	Tatneft Cup 2013 - 2nd selection 1/8 final	Kazan, Russia	KO (uppercut)	1
2012-05-26	Loss	(Russia) Vladimir Mineev	Battle of Ural	Verkhnyaya Pyshma, Russia	RTD (corner retirement)	3
2012-03-11	Win	(Russia) Shamil Abasov	Best Fighter - Russia vs. Belarus	Samara, Russia	Decision (unanimous)	3
2011-12-23	Loss	(Russia) Alexei Papin	Rod Fighting - Shield and Sword 1	Moscow, Russia	Ext. R. decision	4
2011-02-12	Loss	(Russia) Vladimir Mineev	W5 League	Moscow, Russia	Decision (unanimous)	3
2011-01-28	Loss	(Ukraine) Anton Chuvasov	UAMA: Warrior's Honor 5	Kharkiv, Ukraine	KO	
Shoot-Fight Rules Tournament Semi Finals.
2010-03-28	Loss	(Poland) Tomasz Sarara	K-1 World Grand Prix 2010 in Warsaw, Quarter finals	Warsaw, Poland	TKO	3
2010-03-19	Win	(Switzerland) Slavo Polugić	K-1 World Max 2010 - East European Tournament	Minsk, Belarus	Decision	3
2009-10-23	Loss	(Ukraine) Sergei Lascenko	Tatneft Cup 2009 Final	Kazan, Russia	TKO	5
Fight for 3rd place.
2009-09-16	Loss	(Russia) Semen Shelepov	Tatneft Cup 2009 Semifinal	Kazan, Russia	Decision	4
2009-05-26	Win	(Russia) Abdülhalik Magomedov	Tatneft Cup 2009 - 2nd selection 1/4 final	Kazan, Russia	Decision	4
2008-12-19	Win	(Russia) Sheraly Achilov	Tatneft Cup 2009 - 2nd selection 1/8 final	Kazan, Russia	KO	3
2008-08-29	Win	(Russia) Elvin Abbasov	Tatneft Cup 2008 Final	Kazan, Russia	RTD (corner retirement)	1
Wins Tatneft Arena World Cup 2008 (+80 kg) title.
2008-05-29	Win	(Russia) Sergey Pantyuhin	Tatneft Cup 2008 Semifinal	Kazan, Russia	KO (left hook)	1
2008-02-08	Win	(Russia) Andrey Kirsanov	Tatneft Cup 2008 - 4th selection 1/8 final	Kazan, Russia	Decision	4
Legend: Win Loss Draw/no contest Notes

== See also ==
- List of male kickboxers
