= Martin Terpstra =

Dutch kickboxer (born 1987)

- Born: July 7, 1987 (age 39); Netherlands
- Nickname: Dutch Goliath
- Height: 2.07 m (6 ft 9 1/2 in)
- Weight: 116 kg (256 lb; 18.3 st)
- Division: Heavyweight
- Style: Kickboxing
- Fighting out of: Netherlands
- Team: Kyoku Gym

Kickboxing record
- Total: 32
- Wins: 26
- By knockout: 13
- Losses: 6

Martin Terpstra (born July 7, 1987) is a Dutch professional kickboxer, competing in the heavyweight division of Glory, and former Enfusion Heavyweight World Champion.

== Championships and accomplishments ==
=== Professional ===
- Enfusion
  - 2022 Enfusion Heavyweight World Championship

== Fight record ==
Kickboxing Record
26 wins (13 KOs), 6 losses
Date	Result	Opponent	Event	Location	Method	Round	Time
2023-08-19	Loss	(Estonia) Uku Jürjendal	Glory 87 - Heavyweight Tournament, Semi-Final	Rotterdam, Netherlands	KO	1	2:23
2023-03-18	Win	(Morocco) Abderrahman Barkouch	Enfusion #120	Alkmaar, Netherlands	Decision	5	3:00
Defends the Enfusion Heavyweight World Championships.
2022-09-17	Win	(Morocco) Nidal Bchiri	Enfusion #110	Alkmaar, Netherlands	KO	3	0:33
Wins the Enfusion Heavyweight World Championships.
2022-06-11	Win	(Turkey) Muhammed Balli	Glory Rivals 1	Alkmaar, Netherlands	TKO	2	0:25
2022-05-14	Win	(Germany) Vladimír Tok	Enfusion #106	Arnhem, Netherlands	KO	1	2:38
2020-10-03	Win	(Nigeria) Tariq Osaro	Enfusion #98	Netherlands	Decision	3	3:00
2020-02-29	Win	(Netherlands) Jeffrey van Overbeek	Enfusion Talents #79	Eindhoven, Netherlands	TKO		
2019-11-16	Win	(Iran) Kamran Aminzade	Enfusion Talents #77	Groningen, Netherlands	TKO		
2018-06-23	Win	(Turkey) Gurhan Degirmenci	Enfusion Talents #55	Groningen, Netherlands	KO	1	
2017-06-03	Win	(Iran) Kamran Aminzade	Enfusion Talents #34	Groningen, Netherlands	Retired	2	
2016-03-26	Loss	(Netherlands) Fabio Kwasi	North vs The Rest VII	Leek, Netherlands	Decision	3	3:00
2013-03-24	Win	(Poland) Sternik	North vs The Rest	Amsterdam, Netherlands	KO	1	
2012-06-03	Win	(Netherlands) D'Angelo Marshall	Fight Fans	Amsterdam, Netherlands	Decision	3	
2012-02-26	Win	(Suriname) Sergio Pique	Kickboxing Event	Netherlands	Decision	3	3:00
2011-10-01	Win	(Netherlands) Patrick Veenstra	Muay Thai Event	Netherlands	Decision	3	
2011-06-18	Win	(Suriname) Colin George	Kickboxing Event	Netherlands	KO	1	
2011-03-19	Win	(Netherlands) Leen Mulder	Muay Thai	Amsterdam, Netherlands	KO	1	
2010-09-25	Win	(Georgia (country)) Shota Dolidze	Muay Thai Event	Netherlands	Decision	3	
Legend: Win Loss Draw/No contest Notes

== See also ==
- List of male kickboxers
