= Sofian Laidouni =

French-Algerian kickboxer

Sofian Laïdouni
- Born: February 18, 1995 (age 31); Valenciennes, France
- Height: 192 cm (6 ft 4 in)
- Weight: 109 kg (240 lb; 17.2 st)
- Style: Kickboxing, Muay Thai
- Stance: Southpaw
- Fighting out of: Valenciennes, France
- Team: Team Ladouni
- Trainer: Farid Laïdouni
- Years active: 2017–present

Kickboxing record
- Total: 50
- Wins: 43
- By knockout: 19
- Losses: 6
- By knockout: 2
- No contests: 1

Sofian Laïdouni (born February 18, 1995) is a French-Algerian kickboxer, currently competing in the heavyweight division of Glory. As of June 2023, he is ranked as the eighth-best heavyweight kickboxer in the world by Beyond Kickboxing.

== Career ==
=== Early career ===
Laïdouni faced Issa Ba for the AFMT −91 kg championship at Warriors Night on November 17, 2017. He lost the fight by decision. Laïdouni overcame Marouane Bounabi and Frangis Goma by decision over the next four months, before once against fighting for the AFMT −91 kg championship, this time opposite Akram Mrad at Muay Thai Spirit 6 on April 21, 2018. He captured the title with a second-round stoppage of Mrad.

Laïdouni faced Pavel Voronin for the WKN K-1 European Super Cruiserweight (−95 kg) championship at Enfusion 82 on April 13, 2019. He won the fight by a fourth-round technical knockout, as Voronin was unable to continue competing due to an injured shoulder.

Laïdouni took part in the PSM Fight Night 2 four-man tournament, held on November 16, 2019, with the World Boxing Council Muaythai heavyweight title on the line for the eventual winner. Laïdouni earned his place in the tournament finals, where he faced the reigning champion Yassine Boughanem, with a second-round knockout of Daniel Sam. He lost the final bout by a third-round technical knockout. The result of the fight was later overturned to a no-contest by the Belgian federation, as Boughanem landed a knee after the referee had called for a stop in the action to count Laïdouni out.

=== GLORY ===
Laïdouni made his Glory debut against Nabil Khachab at Glory 84 on March 11, 2023. He won the fight by unanimous decision.

Laïdouni faced Benjamin Adegbuyi at Glory 86 on May 27, 2023. He won the fight by unanimous decision.

Laïdouni faced the Glory Heavyweight champion Rico Verhoeven in the quarterfinals of the Glory Heavyweight Grand Prix on March 9, 2024. He lost the fight by unanimous decision.

Laïdouni faced Vladimir Tok at Glory 91 on April 27, 2024. He won the fight by first round technical knockout after Tok dislocated his shoulder thirty seconds into the fight.

On August 31, 2024, Laidouni faced Nico Pereira Horta at Glory 94. He lost the fight by unanimous decision.

Laidouni was announced as part of the Glory 99 “Heavyweight Last Man Standing Tournament” Opening Round event where 32 heavyweight fighters compete on April 5, 2025 in Rotterdam, Netherlands. During the event Laidouni stopped Oleg Pryimachov in the first round after three knockdowns.

He defeated Jamal Ben Saddik in Glory 100 in the first round by blocking a kick from Ben Saddik, with his shin. At 1:36 into the first round, it was stopped by the doctor, as Saddik had a deep cut at the bottom of his shin, which was more than 4 cm (1.5 inches) long from top to bottom en 3 mm (0.12 inches) wide and ruled a TKO.

Laidouni next faced Tariq Osaro in the finals of Phase 1 of the "Last Heavyweight Standing" Tournament the same day. He lost the fight via KO, getting dropped in the opening round, before being knocked down and out with a left hook shortly into the second round.

Laidouni faced Cihad Kepenek at Glory 103, in the opening round of Phase Two of the "Last Heavyweight Standing" Tournament. He won via unanimous decision.

Laidouni faced Nabil Khachab in the semifinals of the Last Heavyweight Standing Qualification Round Phase 2 one-night tournament at Glory 104 - Last Heavyweight Standing wualification round on October 11, 2025. He won the fight by unanimous decision and advanced the to finals where he faced Levi Rigters. He won the fight, again by unanimous decision.

Laidouni faced Miloš Cvjetićanin in the quarterfinals of the Last Heavyweight Standing Finals Tournament, at Glory 105. He lost the fight via unanimous decision.

== Championships and accomplishments ==
- Académie française de Muay Thaï
  - 2018 AMFT −91 kg Championship
- World Kickboxing Network
  - 2019 WKN K-1 European Heavyweight (−95 kg) Championship
- World Association of Kickboxing Organizations
  - 2022 WAKO-Pro K-1 World Super Heavyweight (+94.1 kg) Championship

== Kickboxing and Muay Thai record ==
Professional Muay Thai and kickboxing record
43 wins (19 (T)KOs), 6 losses, 0 draws, 1 no contest
Date	Result	Opponent	Event	Location	Method	Round	Time
2026-10-17	Win	(France) Karim Zeghad	Glory 110	Antwerp, Belgium	Decision (unanimous)	3	3:00
2026-02-07	Loss	(Serbia) Miloš Cvjetićanin	Glory 105 - Last Heavyweight Standing Finals Tournament, Quarterfinals	Arnhem, Netherlands	Decision (unanimous)	3	3:00
2025-10-11	Win	(Netherlands) Levi Rigters	Glory 104 - Last Heavyweight Standing Qualification Round, Final	Rotterdam, Netherlands	Decision (unanimous)	3	3:00
Qualifies for Glory Last Heavyweight Standing - Final Tournament.
2025-10-11	Win	(Morocco) Nabil Khachab	Glory 104 - Last Heavyweight Standing Qualification Round, Semifinals	Rotterdam, Netherlands	Decision (unanimous)	3	3:00
2025-08-23	Win	(Turkey) Cihad Kepenek	Glory 103 - Last Heavyweight Standing Opening Round Phase 2	Rotterdam, Netherlands	Decision (unanimous)	3	3:00
2025-06-14	Loss	(Nigeria) Tariq Osaro	Glory 100 - Last Heavyweight Standing Qualification Round, Final	Rotterdam, Netherlands	KO (left hook)	2	0:33
Qualifies for Glory Last Heavyweight Standing Finals Tournament.
2025-06-14	Win	(Morocco) Jamal Ben Saddik	Glory 100 - Last Heavyweight Standing Qualification Round, Semifinals	Rotterdam, Netherlands	TKO (doctor stoppage)	1	1:36
2025-04-05	Win	(Ukraine) Oleg Pryimachov	Glory 99 - Last Heavyweight Standing, Opening Round	Rotterdam, Netherlands	TKO (3 knockdowns)	1	1:47
2024-12-07	Win	(Romania) Ionuț Iancu	Glory Collision 7	Arnhem, Netherlands	Decision (unanimous)	3	3:00
2024-08-31	Loss	(Cape Verde) Nico Pereira Horta	Glory 94	Antwerp, Belgium	Decision (unanimous)	3	3:00
2024-04-27	Win	(Germany) Vladimir Tok	Glory 91	Paris, France	TKO (shoulder injury)	1	0:42
2024-03-09	Loss	(Netherlands) Rico Verhoeven	Glory Heavyweight Grand Prix, Quarterfinals	Arnhem, Netherlands	Decision (unanimous)	3	3:00
2023-05-27	Win	(Romania) Benjamin Adegbuyi	Glory 86	Essen, Germany	Decision (unanimous)	3	3:00
Qualifies for the 2024 Glory Heavyweight Grand Prix.
2023-03-11	Win	(Morocco) Nabil Khachab	Glory 84	Rotterdam, Netherlands	Decision (unanimous)	3	3:00
2022-06-25	Win	(Czech Republic) Tomáš Hron	Le Défi du Nack Muay 7	Denain, France	Decision (majority)	5	3:00
Wins the WAKO-Pro K-1 World Super Heavyweight (+94.1 kg) Championship.
2021-10-16	Loss	(France) Fabrice Gnedre	Fighting Edition	Valenciennes, France	TKO (punches and knee)	4	3:00
For the ISKA K-1 World Super Heavyweight (+100 kg) Championship.
2019-11-16	NC	(Belgium) Yassine Boughanem	PSM Fight Night 2, Tournament Final	Brussels, Belgium	No contest (illegal strike)	3	
For the WBC Muay Thai Heavyweight title. Originally a TKO victory for Boughanem, overturned by the Belgian Federation as Boughanem landed a strike on a downed opponent.
2019-11-16	Win	(United Kingdom) Daniel Sam	PSM Fight Night 2, Tournament Semi-final	Brussels, Belgium	KO (right straight)	2	1:47
2019-10-12	Win	(France) Steve Magniez	Unkind Fight Série	Valenciennes, France	TKO (doctor stoppage)	1	2:50
2019-04-13	Win	(Moldova) Pavel Voronin	Enfusion 82	Orchies, France	TKO (shoulder injury)	4	
Wins the WKN K-1 European Super Cruiserweight (−95 kg) Championship.
2018-10-06	Win	(France) Pascal Touré	Challenge	St-Amand-les-Eaux, France	Decision (unanimous)	3	3:00
2018-04-21	Win	(France) Akram Mrad	Muay Thai Spirit 6	Les Herbiers, France	TKO (doctor stoppage)	2	
Wins the AFMT −91 kg Championship.
2018-04-07	Win	(France) Frangis Goma	Partouche Kickboxing Tour	Saint-Amand-les-Eaux, France	Decision	3	3:00
2018-02-24	Win	(France) Marouane Bounabi	Fighting Edition	Orchies, France	Decision	3	3:00
2017-11-17	Loss	(France) Issa Ba	Warriors Night	Paris, France	Decision	5	3:00
For the AFMT −91 kg Championship.
2017-05-26	Win	(France) Wilfried Carien	Partouche Kickboxing Tour	Saint-Amand-les-Eaux, France	Decision	3	3:00
2017-03-25	Win	(Belgium) Jelle Braes	Glory 39: Brussels – Undercard	Brussels, Belgium	Decision (unanimous)	3	3:00
Legend: Win Loss Draw/no contest Notes

== See also ==
- List of male kickboxers
