= Giannis Stoforidis =

Greek kickboxer (born 1989)

- Born: May 8, 1989 (age 37); Greece
- Native name: Γιάννης Στοφοριδης
- Other names: Hercules
- Height: 1.89 m (6 ft 2 1/2 in)
- Weight: 108.3 kg (239 lb; 17.05 st)
- Division: Heavyweight
- Reach: 80 in (203 cm)
- Style: Boxing, kickboxing
- Fighting out of: Kavala, Greece
- Team: Karanikolis Team
- Trainer: Panagiotis Karanikolis

Kickboxing record
- Total: 39
- Wins: 26
- By knockout: 17
- Losses: 13
- By knockout: 6

Giannis Stoforidis (Greek: Γιάννης Στοφοριδης; born 8 May 1989) is a Greek kickboxer. He has also fought in the SUPERKOMBAT Fighting Championship, Glory, ONE Championship, Enfusion and OSS Fighters.

== Kickboxing career ==
=== SuperKombat ===
In 2013, Stoforidis entered the SUPERKOMBAT World Grand Prix after impressing in the SuperKombat New Heroes. Previously, he has won the SUPERKOMBAT Tryouts (heavyweight division) in Athens, Greece on January 26, 2013. Finally, he qualified for the SUPERKOMBAT World Grand Prix 2013 Final Elimination.

Stoforidis beat Mathieu Kongolo by third-round TKO at the SUPERKOMBAT World Grand Prix 2013 Final Elimination in Ploiești, Romania on November 9, 2013.

He competed in the SUPERKOMBAT World Grand Prix 2013 Final in Galați, Romania on December 21, 2013, losing to Redouan Cairo via TKO because of a broken hand in the semi-finals.

=== Glory ===
Stoforidis was scheduled to face Anderson Silva at Glory 41: Holland in the semi-finals of the 2017 Glory Heavyweight Contender Tournament on May 20, 2017. He lost by KO in the second round.

=== ONE Championship ===
Stoforidis made his ONE Championship debut against Beybulat Isaev at ONE: Heavy Hitters on January 14, 2022. He won by first-round knockout 31 seconds into the first round.

Stoforidis faced Andrei Stoica at ONE 156 on April 22, 2022. After getting knocked down in the second round, Stoforidis lost by majority decision.

Stoforidis was booked to face Rade Opačić at ONE on Prime Video 2 on September 30, 2022, in the ONE heavyweight Grand Prix alternate bout. He lost the fight by a second-round knockout. It was the second fastest knockout in ONE's kickboxing history.

== Personal life ==
Stroforidis was born on May 8, 1989.

During his boxing course, Stoforidis has trained, mentored by, and developed a friendship with former Greek strongman and weightlifter Kyriakos Kapakoulakis.

== Championships and awards ==
=== Boxing ===
- 2011 National Champion of Greece

=== Kickboxing ===
- Enfusion
  - Enfusion Live Heavyweight Tournament Champion (2019)
- SUPERKOMBAT Fighting Championship
  - SUPERKOMBAT World Grand Prix Runner-up (2013)
- No Limits
  - No Limits Heavyweight Championship (Two times, 2011 & 2012)

=== Muay Thai ===
- International Federation of Muaythai Associations
  - 2024 IFMA World Championship +91 kg (bronze)

== Fight record ==
Professional kickboxing record
26 wins (17 KOs), 13 losses
Date	Result	Opponent	Event	Location	Method	Round	Time
2026-02-28	Loss	(Albania) Françesko Xhaja	SENSHI 30	Varna, Bulgaria	Decision (Unanimous)	3	3:00
2025-12-06	Win	(Netherlands) Dexter Suisse	SENSHI 29	Varna, Bulgaria	TKO (Doctor stop./shin cut)	1	2:14
2025-07-12	Loss	(Turkey) Samet Agdeve	SENSHI 27	Varna, Bulgaria	TKO (Doctor stop./shin cut)	1	1:20
2024-12-07	Win	(Morocco) Nidal Bchiri	SENSHI 24	Varna, Bulgaria	KO (Low kicks)	2	1:55
2024-07-06	Loss	(Brazil) Ariel Machado	SENSHI 22	Varna, Bulgaria	TKO (Punches)	2	1:29
2024-04-20	Win	(Romania) Cristian Ristea	SENSHI 21	Varna, Bulgaria	TKO (Punches)	1	
2023-11-25	Win	(Germany) Nenad Cosic	SENSHI 19	Varna, Bulgaria	TKO (Punches)	2	1:30
2022-10-01	Loss	(Serbia) Rade Opačić	ONE on Prime Video 2	Kallang, Singapore	KO (Punches)	2	1:52
2022-04-22	Loss	(Romania) Andrei Stoica	ONE 158	Kallang, Singapore	Decision (Majority)	3	3:00
2022-01-14	Win	(Russia) Beybulat Isaev	ONE: Heavy Hitters	Singapore	KO (Left Hook)	1	0:31
2020-02-07	Win	(Bosnia and Herzegovina) Enver Šljivar	OSS Fighters 05, Quarter Finals	Bucharest, Romania	TKO (referee stoppage)	3	1:02
2019-12-06	Loss	(Netherlands) Levi Rigters	Enfusion 92, Semi Final	Abu Dhabi, United Arab Emirates	Decision (Unanimous)	3	3:00
2019-05-04	Win	(France) Houari Zeghad	Enfusion Live 84, Final	Darmstadt, Germany	KO (Punch)	1	2:25
Wins the Enfusion Live 84 Heavyweight Tournament.
2019-05-04	Win	(Germany) Andre Schmeling	Enfusion Live 84, Semi Final	Darmstadt, Germany	Decision (Unanimous)	3	3:00
2017-10-07	Win	(Germany) Vladimir Tok	Enfusion Live 54	Ludwigsburg, Germany	Decision (Unanimous)	3	3:00
2017-05-20	Loss	(Brazil) Anderson Silva	Glory 41: Holland, Semi Final	Den Bosch, Netherlands	TKO (punches)	2	2:26
2017-03-22	Win	(Ukraine) Andrei Ohotnik	Tatneft Cup 2017 - 1st selection 1/8 final	Kazan, Russia	KO (straight left)	1	
2016-11-05	Loss	(Germany) Kerim Jemai	Fight Explosion 2, Final	Buchs, Switzerland	KO (Spinning back fist)	2	
2016-11-05	Win	(Bosnia and Herzegovina) Elmir Mehic	Fight Explosion 2, Semifinal	Buchs, Switzerland			
2015-11-07	Loss	(Germany) Kerim Jemai	Fight Explosion	Buchs, Switzerland	Decision	5	3:00
For the WFC World K-1 Heavyweight title.
2015-06-07	Win	(Slovakia) Radovan Kulla	Colosseum Fight Show	Thessaloniki, Greece	KO	1	
2015-02-21	Win	(Greece) Giorgos Mavrogiannis	Best Fighter	Greece	KO	2	
2015-02-07	Win	(Serbia) Miroslav Vujović	Scorpion 8	Thessaloniki, Greece	KO	2	
2014-03-07	Loss	(Romania) Cătălin Moroșanu	SUPERKOMBAT New Heroes 8	Constanța, Romania	KO (Left Hook)	2	2:26
2014-03-07	Loss	(Turkey) Bahadir Sari	AKIN Dövüş Arenası KickBoxing Event	Bakırköy, Turkey	Decision	3	3:00
2013-12-21	Loss	(Suriname) Redouan Cairo	SUPERKOMBAT World Grand Prix 2013 Final, Semi Finals	Galați, Romania	TKO (Hand Injury)	2	
2013-11-30	Win	(Greece) Antonis Tzoros	Best Fighter	Greece	DQ	1	
2013-11-09	Win	(Belgium) Mathieu Kongolo	SUPERKOMBAT World Grand Prix 2013 Final Elimination, Quarter Finals	Ploiești, Romania	TKO (Referee Stoppage)	3	2:58
Stoforidis was awarded wildcard for the event.
2013-09-28	Loss	(Curaçao) D'Angelo Marshall	SUPERKOMBAT World Grand Prix III 2013, Final	Botoșani, Romania	TKO (Referee Stoppage)	3	0:26
For the SUPERKOMBAT World Grand Prix III tournament title.
2013-09-28	Win	(United States) Leroy Johnson	SUPERKOMBAT World Grand Prix III 2013, Semi Finals	Botoșani, Romania	TKO (Referee Stoppage)	2	2:26
2013-04-26	Win	(Romania) Dorin Robert	Old School Fighting	Kavala, Greece	Decision (Unanimous)	3	3:00
2012-12-01	Win	(Greece) Antonis Tzoros	No Limits 20	Patras, Greece	TKO (Referee Stoppage)	2	2:20
Won the No Limits Heavyweight Championship.
2013-07-27	Win	(Germany) Karl Glischynski	Fight Night	Kiel, Germany	TKO (Towel Thrown)	2	0:32
2013-06-02	Win	(Greece) Antonis Tzoros	KIMBO 1	Marousi, Greece	Decision (Unanimous)	3	3:00
2012	Win		No Limits 18	Greece	KO (Left High Kick)	1	1:29
Legend: Win Loss Draw/No contest Notes

Amateur Muay Thai and Kickboxing record
Date	Result	Opponent	Event	Location	Method	Round	Time
2024-06-06	Loss	(Russia) Dmitrii Vasenev	IFMA 2024 World Championships, Tournament Semifinals	Patras, Greece	Walk over		
Wins the 2024 IFMA World Championship +91kg Bronze medal.
2024-06-05	Win	(Turkmenistan) Dovletmyrat Guyjov	IFMA 2024 World Championships, Tournament Quarterfinals	Patras, Greece	TKO	1	
Legend: Win Loss Draw/No contest Notes

== See also ==
- List of male kickboxers
