= Roel Mannaart =

Dutch kickboxer

- Born: February 10, 1994 (age 32); Krommenie, Netherlands
- Height: 1.97 m (6 ft 5 1/2 in)
- Weight: 103.0 kg (227.1 lb; 16.22 st)
- Division: Heavyweight
- Style: Kickboxing
- Stance: Orthodox
- Fighting out of: Amsterdam, Netherlands
- Team: Mejiro Gym
- Trainer: Andre Mannaart

Kickboxing record
- Total: 30
- Wins: 27
- By knockout: 14
- Losses: 3
- By knockout: 2
- Draws: 0

Other information
- Notable relatives: Andre Mannaart (father)
- Website: http://www.roelmannaart.com/
- Boxing record from BoxRec

Roel Mannaart (born 10 February 1994) is a Dutch kickboxer. He is a former K-1 WORLD GP Heavyweight Champion. He also competed for Glory.

Mannaart was ranked as a top ten heavyweight by Combat Press between July 2019 and July 2021, peaking at #7.

== Kickboxing career ==
Manaart beat Semmie Onoiafie at Fighting Rookies in May 2016. He won the fight by a second-round TKO. He would notch up three more wins in the Dutch circuit, defeating Michael Lorenz, Thomas Bridgewater and Nico Pereira Horta.

Mannaart participated in the 2017 K-1 Heavyweight Grand Prix, being scheduled to fight Masahiro Iwashita in the quarterfinals. He beat Iwashita by a first-round knockout, but lost to Ibrahim El Bouni by knockout in the semifinals.

Four months later, Mannaart was scheduled to fight Antonio Plazibat for the K-1 Heavyweight title at K-1: K'FESTA.1. Roel won the fight by unanimous decision.

Mannaart subsequently signed with Glory as well, and fought Daniel Škvor at Glory 59: Amsterdam. He beat Skvor by unanimous decision. In his next fight with Glory, Mannaart was scheduled to fight Kirill Kornilov, whom he beat by unanimous decision.

Mannaart was scheduled to defend his K-1 title against Chris Bradford, at K-1 World GP 2019 Yokohamatsuri. He knocked Bradford out in the first round.

Roel Mannaart returned to Glory at Glory 75: Utrecht to fight Sergej Maslobojev. Maslobojev won the fight by a first-round TKO, with Mannaart suffering a broken jaw during the bout.

Following the loss to Maslobojev, Mannaart returned to K-1 to defend his Heavyweight title in July 2025. He would face former K-1 Cruiserweight champion, K-Jee. Mannaart won the fight via KO in the second round, dropping K-Jee multiple times, before finishing him with low kicks.

== Championships and accomplishments ==
- K-1
  - 2018 K-1 World GP Heavyweight Championship
    - Two successful title defenses

== Kickboxing record ==
Professional kickboxing record
27 Wins (14 (T)KO's), 4 Losses, 0 Draws, 0 No Contests
Date	Result	Opponent	Event	Location	Method	Round	Time
2025-11-15	Loss	(Brazil) Ariel Machado	K-1 World MAX 2025 - 70kg World Championship Tournament Final	Tokyo, Japan	TKO (Punches)	1	3:00
Loses the K-1 WORLD GP Heavyweight Championship.
2025-07-13	Win	(Japan) K-Jee	K-1 Dontaku	Fukuoka, Japan	KO (Low kicks)	2	1:32
Defends the K-1 WORLD GP Heavyweight Championship.
2020-02-29	Loss	(Lithuania) Sergej Maslobojev	Glory 75: Utrecht	Utrecht, Netherlands	TKO (Corner stoppage)	1	1:48
2019-11-24	Win	(Australia) Chris Bradford	K-1 World GP 2019 Yokohamatsuri	Yokohama, Japan	KO (Punches)	1	2:19
Defends the K-1 WORLD GP Heavyweight Championship.
2018-12-08	Win	(Russia) Kirill Kornilov	Glory 62: Rotterdam	Rotterdam, Netherlands	Decision (Unanimous)	3	3:00
2018-09-29	Win	(Czech Republic) Daniel Škvor	Glory 59: Amsterdam	Amsterdam, Netherlands	Decision (Unanimous)	3	3:00
2018-03-21	Win	(Croatia) Antonio Plazibat	K-1 World GP 2018: K'FESTA.1	Saitama, Japan	Decision (Unanimous)	3	3:00
Wins the K-1 WORLD GP Heavyweight Championship.
2017-11-23	Loss	(Morocco) Ibrahim El Bouni	K-1 World GP 2017 Heavyweight Championship Tournament, Semi Finals	Saitama, Japan	KO (Uppercut)	1	3:00
2017-11-23	Win	(Japan) Masahiro Iwashita	K-1 World GP 2017 Heavyweight Championship Tournament, Quarter Finals	Saitama, Japan	KO (Left hook)	1	2:47
2017-05-27	Win	(Cape Verde) Nico Pereira Horta	Rings Fighting Network	Amstelveen, Netherlands	Decision (Unanimous)	3	3:00
2017-04-08	Win	(Germany) Rinor Latifaj	Road 2 Victory Sokudo	Hoorn, Netherlands	TKO (Doctor stoppage)	2	
2017-02-18	Win	(Morocco) Taoufik Benhaddou	Battle Under the Tower	Steenwijk, Netherlands	Decision (Unanimous)	3	3:00
2016-10-22	Win	(Netherlands) Thomas Bridgewater	RINGS Beverwijk 2016	Beverwijk, Netherlands	TKO (Corner stoppage)	3	
2016-06-04	Win	(Germany) Michael Lorenz	Day of Destruction 11	Hanover, Germany	KO (Body kick)	1	1:40
2016-05-22	Win	(Netherlands) Semmie Onoiafie	Enfusion Fighting Rookies	Amsterdam, Netherlands	TKO	2	
2016-02-13	Win	(Germany) Patrick Dierichsweiler	Rissing Sun 2.0	Beilen, Netherlands	TKO (Retirement)	2	3:00
2015-10-17	Win	(Netherlands) Levi Rigters	Ultimate Kickboxing	Hoogeveen, Netherlands	Decision	3	3:00
2015-06-06	Win	(Curaçao) Ali dos Passos	RingFight - Heavyweight Tournament, Final	Eindhoven, Netherlands	Decision	3	3:00
2015-06-06	Win	(Morocco) Abderrahman Barkouch	RingFight - Heavyweight Tournament, Semifinal	Eindhoven, Netherlands	Decision	3	3:00
2015-04-18	Win	(Poland) Piotr Mlinski	Day of Destruction 10	Hamburg, Germany	TKO (Corner stoppage)	3	0:52
2014-09-28	Win	(Germany) André Agbobly	WLF Mejiro	Netherlands	Decision	3	
2014-03-15	Win	(Germany) Fabian Heil	Fight For Victory V	Netherlands	Decision		
Legend: Win Loss Draw/No contest Notes

== See also ==
- List of male kickboxers
- List of K-1 champions
