= Tomáš Možný =

Slovak kickboxer

- Born: April 26, 1991 (age 35); Košice, Czechoslovakia
- Nickname: The Giant Slovak
- Nationality: Slovak
- Height: 2.02 m (6 ft 7 1/2 in)
- Weight: 134.9 kg (297 lb; 21.24 st)
- Division: Heavyweight
- Style: Kickboxing
- Fighting out of: Poprad, Slovakia
- Team: Body Gym Poprad

Kickboxing record
- Total: 33
- Wins: 22
- By knockout: 7
- Losses: 10
- By knockout: 2
- Draws: 1

Mixed martial arts record
- Total: 4
- Wins: 2
- By knockout: 2
- Losses: 2
- By decision: 1
- By disqualification: 1

Other information
- Mixed martial arts record from Sherdog

Tomáš Možný (born April 26, 1991) is a Slovak kickboxer, competing in the heavyweight division of Glory.

== Kickboxing career ==
=== Early career ===
On February 20, 2016 Možný entered a 4-man heavyweight tournament for the vacant WKN K-1 European Super Heavyweight title at Nitra Night of Fighters. In the semifinals he defeated Colin George by decision. In the final he rematched Martin Pacas and won by unanimous decision.

Možný participated in the 2016 Fight Night Saint-Tropez Heavyweight Tournament, which was held on August 4, 2016. Možný was booked to face the former Enfusion champion Daniel Sam in the quarterfinals of the one-day tournament. He won the fight by unanimous decision. Možný advanced to the finals, where he faced Thomas Vanneste. He won the fight by unanimous decision.

After debuting with Glory, Možný faced Alen Kapetanovic at Rebuy Stars Fight Night on June 3, 2017. He won the fight by unanimous decision. Možný next faced Daniel Sam at Fight Night Saint-Tropez on August 4, 2017. He lost the rematch by unanimous decision.

=== Glory ===
Možný returned to Glory following a fourteen-month absence from the sport. He faced Daniel Škvor at Glory 51: Rotterdam on March 3, 2018. Možný won the fight by unanimous decision.

Možný faced Tomasz Sarara for the World Kickboxing Network World Super Heavyweight Championship at NGP: Piatkowska vs. Lindberg on May 25, 2018. He won the fight by a fourth-round technical knockout.

Možný faced Jahfarr Wilnis, in the quarterfinals of the 2018 Glory Heavyweight tournament, at Glory 62: Rotterdam on December 8, 2018. He lost the fight by split decision.

Možný faced Antonio Plazibat at Glory 69: Düsseldorf on October 12, 2019. He lost the fight by unanimous decision, with all five judges scoring the fight 29-25 for Plazibat.

Možný was booked to face Levi Rigters at Glory 78: Rotterdam on September 4, 2021. He lost the fight by a third-round technical knockout, as he was stopped by low kicks.

Možný was expected to face Romeo Benadi at RFA: Warm Up on March 12, 2022. Benadi later withdrew for undisclosed reasons and was replaced by Michal Reissinger. Možný won the fight by a first-round technical knockout.

He takes part in the Glory 99 “Heavyweight Last Man Standing Tournament” where 32 heavyweight fighters compete on April 5, 2025 in Rotterdam, Netherlands.

== Mixed martial arts career ==
Možný made his KSW debut against Arkadiusz Wrzosek at KSW 79 on February 25, 2023. He lost the bout via unanimous decision.

== Championships and accomplishments ==
- World Kickboxing Network
  - 2016 WKN K-1 European Super Heavyweight Champion
- Fight Night Saint-Tropez
  - 2016 Fight Night Saint-Tropez Heavyweight Tournament Winner
- NGP Promotions
  - 2015 NGP Openweight Championship
    - One successful title defense
- Glory
  - 2019 Fight of the Year vs. Antonio Plazibat

== Mixed martial arts record ==
Professional record breakdown
4 matches	2 wins	2 losses
By knockout	2	0
By decision	0	1
By disqualification	0	1

Res.	Record	Opponent	Method	Event	Date	Round	Time	Location	Notes
Win	2–2	Lajos Papp	TKO (punches)	RFA 14	December 2, 2023	2	4:35	Košice, Slovakia	Won the vacant RFA Heavyweight Championship.
Loss	1–2	Arkadiusz Wrzosek	Decision (unanimous)	KSW 79: De Fries vs. Duffee	February 25, 2023	3	5:00	Liberec, Czech Republic	Fight of the Night.
Win	1–1	Kamil Minda	TKO (punches)	RFA 4: Kosice	October 8, 2022	2	4:07	Košice, Slovakia	
Loss	0–1	Hubert Lech	DQ	NoF 2: Laincz vs. Jakopic	November 5, 2011	1		Prešov, Slovakia	

== Kickboxing record ==
Kickboxing record
22 Wins (7 (T)KO's), 10 Losses, 1 Draw, 0 No Contests
Date	Result	Opponent	Event	Location	Method	Round	Time
2026-10-03		(Morocco) Jamal Ben Saddik	K-1 x WFL ~War for the Crown~ Final 16: Part 1	Antwerp, Belgium			
2025-04-05	Win	(Iran) Sina Karimian	Glory 99 - Last Heavyweight Standing, Opening Round	Rotterdam, Netherlands	Decision (Unanimous)	3	3:00
2022-03-12	Win	(Czech Republic) Michal Reissinger	RFA: Warm Up	Bratislava, Slovakia	TKO (Punches)	1	
2021-09-04	Loss	(Netherlands) Levi Rigters	Glory 78: Rotterdam	Rotterdam, Netherlands	TKO (Low kicks)	3	1:02
2019-10-12	Loss	(Croatia) Antonio Plazibat	Glory 69: Düsseldorf	Düsseldorf, Germany	Decision (Unanimous)	3	3:00
2018-12-08	Loss	(Netherlands) Jahfarr Wilnis	Glory 62: Rotterdam, Tournament Quarterfinals	Rotterdam, Netherlands	Decision (Split)	3	3:00
2018-05-25	Loss	(Poland) Tomasz Sarara	NGP: Piatkowska vs. Lindberg	Warsaw, Poland	TKO (Referee stoppage)	4	1:40
For the World Kickboxing Network World Super Heavyweight Championship.
2018-03-03	Win	(Czech Republic) Daniel Škvor	Glory 51: Rotterdam	Rotterdam, Netherlands	Decision (Unanimous)	3	3:00
2017-10-14	Win	(Egypt) Ayman Hassanin	Simply the Best 16	Košice, Slovakia	TKO		
2017-08-04	Loss	(United Kingdom) Daniel Sam	Fight Night Saint-Tropez	Saint-Tropez, France	Decision (Unanimous)	3	3:00
2017-06-03	Win	(Czech Republic) Alen Kapetanovic	Rebuy Stars Fight Night	Košice, Slovakia	Decision (Unanimous)	3	3:00
2017-01-20	Loss	(Brazil) Jhonata Diniz	Glory 37: Los Angeles	Los Angeles, United States	Decision (Unanimous)	3	3:00
2016-08-04	Win	(Belgium) Thomas Vanneste	Fight Night Saint-Tropez, Tournament Final	Saint-Tropez, France	Decision (Unanimous)	3	3:00
Won the Fight Night Saint-Tropez Heavyweight Tournament title.
2016-08-04	Win	(United Kingdom) Daniel Sam	Fight Night Saint-Tropez, Tournament Semifinal	Saint-Tropez, France	Decision (Unanimous)	3	3:00
2016-04-16	Win	(Turkey) Cihad Kepenek	Glory 29: Copenhagen	Copenhagen, Denmark	Ext. R. Decision (Unanimous)	4	3:00
2016-02-20	Win	(Slovakia) Martin Pacas	Nitra Night of Fighters, Final	Nitra, Slovakia	Decision (Unanimous)	3	3:00
Wins the vacant WKN K-1 European Super Heavyweight title.
2016-02-20	Win	(Netherlands) Colin George	Nitra Night of Fighters, Semifinals	Nitra, Slovakia	Decision	3	3:00
2015-12-12	Loss	(Slovakia) Martin Pacas	Diamonds Fight Night II	Liptovský Mikuláš, Slovakia	Ext.R Decision	4	3:00
2015-10-16	Win	(Poland) Arkadiusz Wrzosek	NGP: Boxing Night 11	Warsaw, Poland	Decision (Unanimous)	5	3:00
Defends the NGP Openweight Championship.
2015-10-03	Draw	(Switzerland) Mathieu Kongolo	Simply The Best 6	Poprad, Slovakia	Decision	5	3:00
For the World Kickboxing Network European Super Heavyweight Championship.
2015-06-12	Win	(Poland) Michał Wlazło	NGP: Boxing Night 10	Częstochowa, Poland	TKO (Doctor stoppage)	2	
Defends the NGP Openweight Championship.
2015-05-23	Loss	(Czech Republic) David Vinš	Simply the Best 4	Ústí nad Labem, Czech Republic	Decision (Unanimous)	3	3:00
For the World Kickboxing Network European Super Heavyweight Championship.
2014-01-	Win	(Poland) David Mora	East Pro Fight 3	Košice, Slovakia	Decision	3	3:00
2012-10-27	Loss	(Ukraine) Roman Kryklia	Nitrianska noc bojovníkov 2012	Prague, Czech Republic	Decision	3	3:00
2012-09-02	Loss	(Bosnia and Herzegovina) Dževad Poturak	K-1 Rules: Sarajevo Fight Night 3	Sarajevo, Bosnia and Herzegovina	Decision (Split)	3	3:00

== See also ==
- List of male kickboxers
