= Uku Jürjendal =

Estonian kickboxer (born 1989)

- Born: February 4, 1989 (age 37); Tallinn, then part of Estonian SSR, Soviet Union
- Nationality: Estonia
- Height: 1.93 m (6 ft 4 in)
- Weight: 114 kg (251 lb; 18.0 st)
- Division: Heavyweight
- Style: Kickboxing
- Stance: Orthodox
- Fighting out of: Tallinn, Estonia

Kickboxing record
- Total: 30
- Wins: 20
- By knockout: 13
- Losses: 10
- By knockout: 3

Uku Jürjendal (born February 4, 1989) is an Estonian professional kickboxer, currently competing in the heavyweight division of GLORY.

== Championships and accomplishments ==
- GLORY
  - Glory 87 Heavyweight Tournament runner-up
- Leveli Fight Night
  - 2021 Leveli Fight Night Tournament Champion

== Professional kickboxing record ==
Kickboxing record
20 wins (13 KOs), 10 losses
| Date | Result | Opponent | Event | Location | Method | Round | Time |
| 2025-02-22 | Loss | (Morocco) Jamal Ben Saddik | Glory 98 | Rotterdam, Netherlands | KO (high kick) | 3 | 2:59 |
| 2024-03-09 | Loss | (Netherlands) Levi Rigters | Glory Heavyweight Grand Prix, Quarterfinals | Arnhem, Netherlands | KO | 2 | 1:52 |
| 2023-10-07 | Win | (Morocco) Badr Hari | Glory 89 | Burgas, Bulgaria | TKO | 2 | 0:47 |
Qualifies for the 2024 Glory Heavyweight Grand Prix.
| 2023-08-19 | Loss | (Azerbaijan) Bahram Rajabzadeh | Glory 87 - Heavyweight Tournament, Final | Rotterdam, Netherlands | Decision | 3 | 3:00 |
Fight was for Glory Heavyweight Grand Prix Qualifier.
| 2023-08-19 | Win | (Netherlands) Martin Terpstra | Glory 87 - Heavyweight Tournament, Semi-Final | Rotterdam, Netherlands | KO | 1 | 2:23 |
| 2023-05-27 | Win | (Lithuania) Mantas Rimdeika | Glory 86 | Essen, Germany | KO (right hook) | 1 | 2:33 |
| 2023-03-18 | Win | (Morocco) Hamza Ourahou | The League IV | Tallinn, Estonia | TKO | 2 | |
| 2023-02-11 | Loss | (Morocco) Nabil Khachab | Glory 83 | Essen, Germany | Decision | 3 | 3:00 |
| 2022-12-03 | Win | (Belgium) Youness Ben Malek | SENSHI 14 | Varna, Bulgaria | Decision | 3 | 3:00 |
| 2022-09-10 | Win | (Germany) Nenad Ćosić | SENSHI 13 | Varna, Bulgaria | TKO | | |
| 2022-07-29 | Win | (Czech Republic) Tomáš Hron | Yangames Fight Night ve Žlutých lázních | Prague, Czech Republic | Decision | 3 | 3:00 |
| 2022-07-09 | Win | (Netherlands) Bas Vorstenbosch | SENSHI 12 | Bulgaria | KO | 2 | |
| 2022-04-15 | Win | (Poland) Jakub Kozera | The League III | Tallinn, Estonia | KO | | |
| 2022-02-26 | Loss | (Bosnia and Herzegovina) Ahmed Krnjić | SENSHI 11 | Varna, Bulgaria | Decision (split) | 4 | 3:00 |
| 2021-12-18 | Win | (Hungary) Dávid Mihajlov | Leveli Fight Night Christmas Mayhem | Helsinki, Finland | KO (right hook) | 2 | |
| 2021-08-07 | Win | (Belarus) Fedor Koltun | Number One Fight Show : Season 13 | Estonia | KO | 2 | |
| 2021-05-29 | Win | (Finland) Timo Tapiala | Leveli Fight Night Tournament Final | Espoo, Finland | KO | 1 | 0:03 |
Wins the 2021 Leveli Fight Night Tournament.
| 2021-05-29 | Win | (Finland) Daniel Forsberg | Leveli Fight Night Tournament Semi-Final | Espoo, Finland | Decision | 3 | 3:00 |
| 2019-11-23 | Loss | (Belarus) Fedor Koltun | Number One Fight Show : Season 12 | Estonia | Decision | 3 | 3:00 |
| 2018-10-26 | Loss | (Czech Republic) Michal Reissinger | Heroes Gate 21 | Czech Republic | KO | 2 | |
| 2018-09-22 | Win | (Russia) Aleksei Dmitriev | Number One Fight Show | Estonia | KO | 1 | |
| 2018-05-18 | Win | (Serbia) Saša Polugić | Number One Fight Show : Season 9 | Tallinn, Estonia | KO (low kicks) | 1 | |
| 2018 | Win | (Thailand) Portraor | MAX Muaythai | Thailand | KO | 1 | |
Legend: Win Loss Draw/no contest Notes

== See also ==
- List of male kickboxers
