= Nico Pereira Horta =

Dutch-Cape verdean kickboxer

- Born: Nico Pereira Horta; 8 October 1991 (age 35); Rotterdam, Netherlands
- Nickname: Big Sexy
- Height: 1.98 m (6 ft 6 in)
- Weight: 130 kg (287 lb; 20 st 7 lb)
- Division: Heavyweight
- Style: Kickboxing
- Stance: Orthodox
- Fighting out of: Rotterdam, Netherlands
- Team: ARJ Trainingen
- Trainer: Mike Polanen

Kickboxing record
- Total: 40
- Wins: 27
- By knockout: 4
- Losses: 13
- By knockout: 2
- Draws: 0

Nico Pereira Horta (born 8 October 1991) is a Dutch-Cape Verdean professional kickboxer, currently competing in the heavyweight division of Glory.

As of April 2025 he was the #7 ranked Heavyweight kickboxer in the world by Beyond Kickboxing.

== Career ==
=== Early career ===
Pereira Horta faced Roel Mannaart on May 3, 2017, at RINGS Fighting Network. He lost the fight by decision.

On June 2, 2018, Pereira Horta faced Luigj Gashi at Le Choc des Mondes. He lost by controversial unanimous decision in a fight where he scored two knockdowns and his opponent none.

Pereira Horta was scheduled to face Cristian Ristea at OSS Fighters 06. He lost the fight by split decision.

=== Glory ===
Pereira Horta made his Glory Kickboxing debut as a short notice replacement to rematch Levi Rigters at Glory 92 on May 18, 2024. He lost the fight by unanimous decision.

On August 31, 2024, Pereira Horta faced Sofian Laidouni at Glory 94. He won the fight by unanimous decision and made his entry in top ten of the Glory heavyweight division.

Pereira Horta faced Tariq Osaro at Glory 95 on September 21, 2024. He lost the fight by unanimous decision.

Pereira Horta was announced as part of the 2025 Glory Last Heavyweight Standing tournament. On April 5, 2025, he faced Rade Opačić at Glory 99. He won by knockout in the second round and qualified for the next round of the tournament happening at Glory 100 where he will face Colin George on June 14, 2025.

== Championships and accomplishments ==
- Glory
  - 2025 Glory Upset of the Year (vs. Rade Opačić)
- Heresh XL
  - 2026 Heresh Heavyweight Champion

== Kickboxing record ==
27 Wins (4 (T)KO's), 13 Losses, 0 Draw
Date	Result	Opponent	Event	Location	Method	Round	Time
2026-11-28		(Lithuania) Mantas Rimdeika	UTMA #21	Kaunas, Lithuania			
2026-06-20	Win	(United Kingdom) Ben Mason	Heresh L	Dordrecht, Netherlands	Decision (Unanimous)	5	3:00
Wins the vacant Heresh Heavyweight title.
2026-04-25	Loss	(Nigeria) Tariq Osaro	Glory 107	Rotterdam, Netherlands	Decision (Unanimous)	3	3:00
2025-12-13	Loss	(Morocco) Nidal Bchiri	Glory Collision 8	Arnhem, Netherlands	TKO (3 Knockdowns)	1	2:59
2025-06-14	Win	(Serbia) Miloš Cvjetićanin	Glory 100 - Last Heavyweight Standing Qualification Round, Final	Rotterdam, Netherlands	Decision (Split)	3	3:00
Qualifies for Glory Last Heavyweight Standing Finals Tournament.
2025-06-14	Win	(Suriname) Colin George	Glory 100 - Last Heavyweight Standing Qualification Round, Semifinals	Rotterdam, Netherlands	Decision (Unanimous)	3	3:00
2025-04-05	Win	(Serbia) Rade Opačić	Glory 99 - Last Heavyweight Standing, Opening Round	Rotterdam, Netherlands	KO (Right cross)	2	2:52
2024-09-21	Loss	(Nigeria) Tariq Osaro	Glory 95	Zagreb, Croatia	Decision (Unanimous)	3	3:00
2024-08-31	Win	(France) Sofian Laidouni	Glory 94	Antwerp, Belgium	Decision (Unanimous)	3	3:00
2024-05-18	Loss	(Netherlands) Levi Rigters	Glory 92	Rotterdam, Netherlands	Decision (Unanimous)	3	3:00
2022-06-04	Loss	(Slovakia) Martin Pacas	KOK World Series 101	Liptovsky Mikulas, Slovakia	Decision (Majority)	3	3:00
2021-11-01	Win	(Morocco) Nidal Bchiri	Superkombat Universe	Dubai, UAE	Decision (Unanimous)	3	3:00
2021-07-16	Loss	(Romania) Cristian Ristea	OSS Fighters 06	Constanța, Romania	Decision (Split)	3	3:00
2018-06-02	Loss	(Albania) Luigj Gashi	Le Choc des Mondes	Caudry, France	Decision (Unanimous)	3	3:00
2018-04-14	Loss	(Netherlands) Achraf Houssini	Alphen Fight Night III	Alphen aan den Rijn, Netherlands	Decision	3	3:00
2017-05-27	Loss	(Netherlands) Roel Mannaart	Rings Fighting Network	Amstelveen, Netherlands	Decision (Unanimous)	3	3:00
2016-12-03	Win	(Ghana) Kevin Sarfo	Enfusion Rookies	The Hague, Netherlands	Decision (Unanimous)	3	3:00
2016-06-04	Loss	(Netherlands) Levi Rigters	King of the Ring, Final	Westervoort, Netherlands	Decision	3	3:00
2016-06-04	Win	(Curaçao) Ali dos Passos	King of the Ring, Semifinals	Westervoort, Netherlands	Decision (Unanimous)	3	3:00
2015-03-28	Win	(Netherlands) Nicky Beumer	Fightersheart III	Arnhem, Netherlands	Decision (Unanimous)	3	3:00
Legend: Win Loss Draw/No contest Notes

== Custom rules record ==
Professional record breakdown
1 match	1 win	0 losses
By knockout	1	0
By submission	0	0
By decision	0	0

Res.	Record	Opponent	Method	Event	Date	Round	Time	Location	Notes
Win	1–0	Thiago Resende	KO (punches)	LSG 1	26 September 2026	1	1:23	's-Hertogenbosch, Netherlands	LSG rules.
