= Daniel Sam =

British kickboxer (born 1981)

- Born: Daniel Anthony Sam; 13 August 1981 (age 45); London, England
- Other names: The Warrior
- Nationality: English
- Height: 1.97 m (6 ft 5 1/2 in)
- Weight: 115 kg (254 lb; 18.1 st)
- Division: Super Heavyweight
- Reach: 77.5 in (197 cm)
- Style: Muay Thai; Kickboxing
- Fighting out of: London, England
- Team: Muay Thai Masters Academy; Mike's Gym
- Trainer: Arjarn Vinny Deckon

Kickboxing record
- Total: 57
- Wins: 39
- By knockout: 21
- Losses: 18
- By knockout: 6

Other information
- Occupation: Black Diamond Gym
- Last updated on: 11 November 2017

Daniel Anthony Sam (born 13 August 1981) is an English super heavyweight kickboxer and is currently ranked UK number 1 in the heavyweight division of Muay Thai. He has fought on the top kickboxing promotions including Enfusion, SUPERKOMBAT, Glory and most recently Dynamite Fighting Show. Sam is known for his flying knees, devastating low kicks and strong punches.

== Kickboxing career ==
In September 2017 Sam fought on the Phoenix Championship 3 event at the o2 arena, London. In a fight under full Muay Thai rules, he beat Steven 'the Panda' Banks via TKO in the 3rd round.

In a rematch versus Tomáš Možný on Fight Night St. Tropez (August 2017), Sam avenged a loss suffered a year earlier on the same event, winning by unanimous decision against the GLORY kickboxing world ranked no.10 heavyweight.

Sam won the Capital Fights French Federation title with a unanimous decision win over Nordine Mahieddine in Paris (May 2017).

In March 2017, Sam won the Enfusion Live Abu Dhabi tournament with two wins in one night and captured the fighter of the night award. In the semi-final he beat Moroccan heavyweight Yassin Ben Sallam via unanimous decision. In the tournament final Sam faced GLORY ranked no.15 Thomas Vanneste from Belgium and won with a devastating 3rd-round knockout.

In November 2016 Sam faced Patrice Quarteron in a highly anticipated grudge match in Paris, winning by unanimous decision in front of a large crowd in November 2017. The fight and the result gained worldwide popularity due to the hostile build up and bad blood between both fighters. Top French rapper Booba subsequently recorded a song titled Daniel Sam in which he celebrates Sam's victory.

Puerto Rico hosted the SUPERKOMBAT kickboxing event in March 2016 with Sam taking on Catalin Morasanu the hard punching and very popular Southpaw Romanian heavyweight. Sam won via a controversial split decision.

Enfusion reality tournament season 4 (Search for the superpro) took place in Koh Samui, Thailand in Sep 2013. Sam faced 4 opponents from Australia, Netherlands, Ivory Coast and Morocco (the last 3 opponents were fought all in a one night tournament). Sam won every fight, the tournament and became the Enfusion Heavyweight World Champion.

In March 2013 Sam signed with GLORY and defeated Singh Jaideep by way of unanimous decision at Glory 5: London in London, England on 23 March 2013.

In November 2014 Daniel Sam launched his own fitness training company called Daniel Sam Fitness, using martial arts and combat based fitness training. As of 2018 he is coaching out of Diesel Gym London.

Sam faced Marian Tuma for the Immortal Champions Heavyweight Title (+95 kg) at Immortal Champions 3 on 7 June 2022, following a three-year absence from the sport. He won the fight by a first-round technical knockout.

Sam was booked to face the former French national heavyweight boxing champion Raphaël Tronché at Alpha Fight League 2 on 12 November 2022. He lost the fight by a second-round knockout.

== Championships and accomplishments ==
=== Kickboxing ===
- Immortal Champions
  - 2022 Immortal Champions Heavyweight (+95 kg) Championship
- Dynamite Fighting Show
  - Fight of the Night (One time) vs. Cătălin Moroșanu
- Capital Fights
  - 2017 Capital Fights French Federation Heavyweight title
- Enfusion
  - 2017 Enfusion Live 48 Heavyweight Tournament Champion
  - 2013 Enfusion 4: Search for the SuperPro Tournament Champion
- SUPERKOMBAT
  - 2012 SUPERKOMBAT World Grand Prix II Tournament Runner-up
- Ringmasters
  - 2007 Ringmasters Heavyweight Tournament Champion

=== Muaythai ===
- 2009 English Muaythai Super Heavyweight Champion
- 2007 IFMA Muaythai European Cup (gold) +95 kg

== Kickboxing record ==
Kickboxing record
39 Wins (21 (T)KO's), 18 Losses, 0 Draws, 0 No Contests
| Date | Result | Opponent | Event | Location | Method | Round | Time |
| 2022-11-12 | Loss | (France) Raphaël Tronché | Alpha Fight League 2 | Brussels, Belgium | KO | 2 | |
| 2022-06-07 | Win | (Czech Republic) Marian Tuma | Immortal Champions 3 | London, England | TKO (Referee stoppage) | 1 | |
Won the Immortal Champions Heavyweight Title +95 kg.
| 2019-11-19 | Loss | (Algeria) Sofian Laidouni | PSM Fight Night 2, Tournament Semi-final | Brussels, Belgium | KO (Straight Right) | 2 | 1:47 |
| 2019-06-06 | Loss | (Romania) Cătălin Moroșanu | Dynamite Fighting Show 4 | Cluj-Napoca, Romania | Decision (Unanimous) | 3 | 3:00 |
| 2019-02-24 | Loss | (China) Asihati | Kunlun Fight 80: Heavyweight Tournament, Quarter Finals | China | TKO (Three Knockdowns/Punches) | 2 | 2:10 |
| 2017-12-09 | Loss | (Belgium) Yassine Boughanem | Golden Fight | France | Decision (Unanimous) | 3 | 3:00 |
| 2017-11-18 | Loss | (Germany) Michael Smolik | Steko's Fight Night Düsseldorf | Germany | Decision (Unanimous) | 5 | 3:00 |
For The WKU World Heavyweight Title +95 kg.
| 2017-09-22 | Win | (United States) Steven Banks | Phoenix 3 London | England | TKO (Referee Stoppage/Right Cross) | 3 | 1:00 |
| 2017-08-04 | Win | (Slovakia) Tomáš Možný | Fight Night Saint-Tropez | France | Decision (Unanimous) | 3 | 3:00 |
| 2017-05-20 | Win | (Algeria) Nordine Mahieddine | Capital Fights 2 | Paris, France | Decision | 3 | 3:00 |
Wins Capital Fights French Federation Heavyweight Title +95 kg.
| 2017-03-24 | Win | (Belgium) Thomas Vanneste | Enfusion Live 48 | Abu Dhabi, UAE | KO (Straight right) | 3 | |
Wins Enfusion Live 48 Heavyweight Tournament. Won fighter of the night award.
| 2017-03-24 | Win | (Morocco) Yassin Ben Sallam | Enfusion Live 48 | Abu Dhabi, UAE | Decision | 3 | 3:00 |
| 2017-02-18 | Win | (Morocco) Fikri Ameziane | Enfusion Live 46 | Eindhoven, Netherlands | KO | 2 | |
| 2016-11-24 | Win | (France) Patrice Quarteron | Paris Fight 2 | Paris, France | Decision | 3 | 3:00 |
| 2016-08-04 | Loss | (Slovakia) Tomáš Možný | Fight Night Saint Tropez, Semi Finals | France | Decision | 3 | 3:00 |
| 2016-07-02 | Win | (Russia) Vladimir Toktasynov | Respect World Series 2 | London, England | Decision (Unanimous) | 3 | 3:00 |
| 2016-03-26 | Win | (Romania) Cătălin Moroșanu | SUPERKOMBAT World Grand Prix I 2016 | San Juan, Puerto Rico | Decision (split) | 3 | 3:00 |
| 2015-08-07 | Loss | (United States) Xavier Vigney | Glory 23: Las Vegas | Las Vegas, Nevada, USA | Decision (split) | 3 | 3:00 |
| 2015-06-13 | Win | (Netherlands) Brian Douwes | SUPERKOMBAT Special Edition | Spreitenbach, Switzerland | Decision (Split) | 3 | 3:00 |
| 2014-09-23 | Loss | (Poland) Lukasz Krupadziorow | Enfusion 5: Victory of the Vixen, Semi Finals | Koh Samui, Thailand | Decision | 3 | 3:00 |
| 2014-06-29 | Loss | (Morocco) Ismael Lazaar | Enfusion Live 19 | London, England | KO (left hook) | 3 | 0:40 |
Loses the Enfusion Live Super Heavyweight +95 kg world title.
| 2014-05-03 | Loss | (Romania) Benjamin Adegbuyi | Glory 16: Denver | Broomfield, Colorado, USA | KO (right cross) | 2 | 2:59 |
| 2013-11-23 | Loss | (France) Nicolas Wamba | La 20ème Nuit des Champions | Marseilles, France | Decision (Unanimous) | 3 | 3:00 |
For NDC K-1 rules heavyweight +100 kg title.
| 2013-10-12 | Loss | (Russia) Sergei Kharitonov | Glory 11: Chicago | Hoffman Estates, Illinois, USA | Decision (0–3) | 3 | 3:00 |
| 2013-09-17 | Win | (Morocco) Mo Boubkari | Enfusion 4: Search for the SuperPro, Finals | Koh Samui, Thailand | Decision (3–0) | 3 | 3:00 |
Wins Enfusion heavyweight tournament world title.
| 2013-09-17 | Win | (Belgium) Kirk Krouba | Enfusion 4: Search for the SuperPro, Semi Finals | Koh Samui, Thailand | Decision (2–1) | 3 | 3:00 |
| 2013-09-17 | Win | (Curaçao) Wendell Roche | Enfusion 4: Search for the SuperPro, Quarter Finals | Koh Samui, Thailand | Decision (3–0) | 3 | 3:00 |
| 2013-09-12 | Win | (Australia) Iggy McGowan | Enfusion 4: Search for the SuperPro, First Round | Koh Samui, Thailand | Decision (3–0) | 3 | 3:00 |
| 2013-06-22 | Loss | (Brazil) Anderson Silva | Glory 9: New York | New York City, New York, USA | Decision (0–3) | 3 | 3:00 |
| 2013-03-23 | Win | (India) Singh Jaideep | Glory 5: London | London, England | Decision (3–0) | 3 | 3:00 |
| 2012-12-22 | Win | (Morocco) Ibrahim Aarab | SUPERKOMBAT WGP 2012 Final | Bucharest, Romania | Decision (2–1) | 3 | 3:00 |
| 2012-11-10 | Loss | (Suriname) Ismael Londt | SUPERKOMBAT WGP 2012 Final Elimination, Quarter Finals | Craiova, Romania | TKO (doctor stoppage) | 1 | |
| 2012-05-12 | Loss | (Romania) Raul Cătinaș | SUPERKOMBAT WGP II 2012, Finals | Cluj-Napoca, Romania | Decision (0–3) | 3 | 3:00 |
For the SUPERKOMBAT WGP II 2012 tournament title.
| 2012-05-12 | Win | (Netherlands) Sam Tevette | SUPERKOMBAT WGP II 2012, Semi Finals | Cluj-Napoca, Romania | KO | 1 | 1:30 |
| 2012-03-31 | Loss | (Czech Republic) Tomáš Hron | Gala night Thaiboxing | Žilina, Slovakia | Decision (0–3) | 3 | 3:00 |
| 2011-11-17 | Loss | (Australia) Ben Edwards | SUPERKOMBAT Fight Club, Quarter Finals | Oradea, Romania | TKO (referee stoppage) | 2 | 2:43 |
| 2011-06-19 | Win | (Greece) Thanasis Michaloudis | Team Tieu's Super Muay Thai Championships | London, England | TKO (kicks to the body) | 3 | |
| 2011-03-12 | Loss | (Italy) Luca Panto | Fight Code: Dragon Series Round 2 | Milan, Italy | Decision | 3 | 3:00 |
| 2010-05-29 | Win | (Italy) Alessio Valentini | MSA Muaythai Premier League 3 | London, England | KO | 1 | 1:22 |
| 2009-05-24 | Loss | (England) Dillian Whyte | | London, England | | | |
| 2009-03-01 | Win | (Lithuania) Arunas Andriveskius | | Luton, England | KO (punch) | | |
Wins English super heavyweight championship.
| 2009-02-07 | Win | (England) Chris Knowles | | London, England | Decision | 3 | 3:00 |
| 2008-12-07 | Win | (England) Lyndon Knowles | | London, England | | | |
| 2007-00-00 | Win | (England) Mark Fuller | Ringmasters, Finals | Manchester, England | TKO (lowkick) | 1 | |
Wins Ringmasters heavyweight tournament title.
| 2007-00-00 | Win | (England) Matt Scott | Ringmasters, Semi Finals | Manchester, England | Decision | 2 | |
| 2007-00-00 | Win | (England) Theo Thedoulou | Ringmasters, Quarter Finals | Manchester, England | Decision | 2 | |
| 2007-00-00 | Win | (England) Lee Stewart | | Manchester, England | KO (punch) | 1 | |
| | Win | (Wales) Will Riva | | | KO (flying knee) | | |
Legend: Win Loss Draw/No contest Notes

== See also ==
- List of male kickboxers
