= Redouan Cairo =

Surinamese-Dutch kickboxer

- Born: Sergiano Herbert Cairo; November 29, 1982 (age 43); Suriname
- Other names: The Spartan
- Height: 1.92 m (6 ft 3 1/2 in)
- Weight: 93 kg (205 lb; 14 st 9 lb)
- Division: Heavyweight
- Reach: 79.0 in (201 cm)
- Style: Muay Thai
- Fighting out of: Amsterdam, Netherlands
- Team: Team Slamm; Mousid Gym; Burning Heart Dojo
- Trainer: Mousid Akhamrane; Atje Smit; Rodney Glunder (2014–present)

Kickboxing record
- Total: 40
- Wins: 21
- By knockout: 10
- Losses: 14
- Draws: 3
- No contests: 2

Mixed martial arts record
- Total: 3
- Losses: 3
- By knockout: 2

Other information
- Mixed martial arts record from Sherdog
- Last updated on: September 27, 2014

Sergiano Herbert Cairo (born 29 November 1982), better known as Redouan Cairo, is a Surinamese-Dutch kickboxer fighting in the Superkombat Fighting Championship where he is the 2013 Superkombat World Grand Prix Tournament runner-up. Also a mixed martial artist, he is a former WAKO-Pro world cruiser heavyweight K-1 rules -94.1 kg champion.

He is ranked #10 light heavyweight kickboxer of the world by Liverkick.com.

== Career ==
Cairo was two times WAKO-Pro champion, intercontinental in 2011 and world in 2013.

He became WAKO-Pro K-1 rules Intercontinental Champion against Andrei Stoica after five round of fighting. They had a rematch on Superkombat event in Podgorica, Montenegro on February 25, 2012. Originally, it was announced that Stoica defeated Cairo via decision after 3 rounds. However, SK officials overturned the decision to a no contest as the judges actually scored the bout a majority draw. Stoica had also caused controversy by referring to Cairo as "the nigger" in his post-fight interview. Stoica himself apologized for the mistake, blaming his poor command of English.

On July 30, 2011, Cairo took on Dzianis Hancharonak in Las Vegas, NV, United States. The action started immediately and after scoring a knocked down twice in the second round, Cairo lost by TKO in round three.

Also in Monaco, Cairo won his second WAKO-Pro title. This time against Zinedine Hameur-Lain by KO in fourth round. His reign didn't last long as he lost title to Vladimir Mineev in Russia one month later.

He rematched Sebastian Ciobanu at Superkombat World Grand Prix 2013 IV in Giurgiu, Romania on October 12, 2013, and won with a brutal knee KO in round three.

He beat Jegish Yegoian by unanimous decision at the Superkombat World Grand Prix 2013 Final Elimination in Ploiești, Romania on November 9, 2013.

He competed in the Superkombat World Grand Prix 2013 Final in Galați, Romania on December 21, 2013, beating Giannis Stoforidis via TKO due to a broken hand in the semi-finals before dropping a unanimous decision to Frank Muñoz after an extension round in the final.

There was no winner in a rematch against Dzianis Hancharonak at Kickboxing Empire II in Las Vegas, Nevada, United States on March 8, 2014, as the fight ended in a draw.

== Titles ==
- Professional
  - 2014 Real Fighters World Champion -95 kg (1 title def.)
  - 2013 WAKO-Pro K-1 rules World Champion -94 kg
  - 2011 WAKO-Pro K-1 rules Intercontinental Champion -85 kg
- Superkombat Fighting Championship
  - 2014 Knockout of the Year nomination (vs. Ali Cenik)
  - 2013 Superkombat World Grand Prix Tournament runner-up
- Amateur
  - 2006 IFMA World Muaythai champion (gold)
  - 2002 Dutch amateur champion -86 kg

== Kickboxing record ==
Professional kickboxing record
21 wins (10 KOs), 14 losses, 3 draws, 2 no contests
Date	Result	Opponent	Event	Location	Method	Round	Time
2017-10-29	Loss	(Netherlands) Levi Rigters	WFL: Manhoef vs. Bonjasky, Final 16	Almere, Netherlands	TKO	1	—N/a
2017-04-23	Loss	(Netherlands) Brian Douwes	WFL - Champion vs. Champion, Semi Finals	Almere, Netherlands	Decision	3	3:00
2016-06-04	Loss	(Belarus) Igor Bugaenko	ACB KB 6: Battle in Brussels	Brussels, Belgium	Decision	3	3:00
2016-04-03	Loss	(Cape Verde) Luis Tavares	WFL - Where Heroes Meet Legends	Hoofddorp, Netherlands	Decision	3	3:00
2016-03-05	Win	(Suriname) Ashwin Balrak	The Battle	Netherlands	KO	1	
2015-12-06	Win	(Morocco) Ibrahim El Bouni	Real Fighters: A Night 2 Remember	Hilversum, Netherlands	KO	5	
Defended Real Fighter World Championship -95 kg.
2015-10-18	Loss	(Spain) Loren Javier	WFL "Unfinished Business", Semi Finals	Hoofddorp, Netherlands	Decision	3	3:00
2015-04-19	Win	(Spain) Loren Javier	The Best of all Elements	Almere, Netherlands	KO (left hook)	3	
2014-11-30	Win	(Netherlands) Fred Sikking	Real Fighters: A Night 2 Remember	Hilversum, Netherlands	Decision (unanimous)	5	3:00
Wins Real Fighter World Championship -95 kg.
2014-09-27	Win	(Belgium) Ali Cenik	Superkombat World Grand Prix IV 2014	Almere, Netherlands	KO (flying knee)	3	
2014-06-08	Win	(Netherlands) Patrick Veenstra	Fight Fans 10	Amsterdam, Netherlands	Decision	3	3:00
2014-03-08	Draw	(Belarus) Dzianis Hancharonak	Kickboxing Empire II	Las Vegas, Nevada, USA	Decision (split)	5	3:00
2013-12-21	Loss	(Spain) Frank Muñoz	Superkombat World Grand Prix 2013 Final, Final	Galați, Romania	Ext. r. decision (unanimous)	4	3:00
Fight was for 2013 Superkombat World Grand Prix tournament title.
2013-12-21	Win	(Greece) Giannis Stoforidis	Superkombat World Grand Prix 2013 Final, Semi Finals	Galați, Romania	TKO (hand injury)	2	
2013-11-09	Win	(Armenia) Jegish Yegoian	Superkombat World Grand Prix 2013 Final Elimination, Quarter Finals	Ploiești, Romania	Decision (unanimous)	3	3:00
2013-10-12	Win	(Romania) Sebastian Ciobanu	Superkombat World Grand Prix IV 2013	Giurgiu, Romania	KO (knee)	3	2:42
2013-05-11	Draw	(France) Abdarhmane Coulibaly	THE GAME	Saint-Denis, La Réunion	Decision	3	3:00
2013-04-20	Loss	(Russia) Vladimir Mineev	Battle of Moscow 11	Moscow, Russia	Decision (unanimous)	5	3:00
Lost WAKO-Pro World Cruiser Heavyweight -94.1 kg Championship (K-1 rules).
2013-03-09	Win	(France) Zinedine Hameur-Lain	Monte Carlo Fighting Masters	Monte Carlo, Monaco	TKO	3	
Wins WAKO-Pro World Cruiser Heavyweight -94.1 kg Championship (K-1 rules).
2012-07-07	Win	(Bulgaria) Kolyo Ivanov	Superkombat World Grand Prix III	Varna, Bulgaria	TKO (low kicks)	3	
2012-05-12	Loss	(Romania) Sebastian Ciobanu	Superkombat World Grand Prix II 2012	Cluj Napoca, Romania	TKO	2	0:12
2012-02-25	NC	(Romania) Andrei Stoica	Superkombat World Grand Prix I 2012	Podgorica, Montenegro	No contest	3	3:00
Originally, it was announced that Stoica defeated Cairo via decision. However, Superkombat officials overturned the decision to a no contest as the judges actually scored the bout a majority draw.
2011-10-01	Loss	(Spain) Frank Muñoz	Superkombat World Grand Prix III	Brăila, Romania	Decision	3	3:00
2011-07-30	Loss	(Belarus) Dzianis Hancharonak	Kickboxing Empire I	Las Vegas, Nevada, USA	KO	3	2:06
2011-07-04	Draw	(Angola) Henriques Zowa	Death Before Dishonor	Almere, Netherlands	Decision	3	3:00
2011-05-27	Loss	(Czech Republic) Ondřej Hutník	Grand Prix Chomutov	Chomutov, Czech Republic	Decision (unanimous)	3	3:00
2011-04-30	Win	(Romania) Andrei Stoica	K-1 Rules Kickboxing in Monaco	Monte Carlo, Monaco	Decision	5	3:00
Wins vacant WAKO-Pro K-1 rules -85 kg Intercontinental title.
2011-03-27	Win	(Russia) Anzor Shihabahov	North Against South part 3		Decision	3	3:00
2010-12-23	Win	(Netherlands) Hicham Achalhi	Slamm Klaar om te Bosse	Paramaribo, Suriname	Decision	3	3:00
2010-08-28	Loss	(Belgium) Filip Verlinden	Slamm Fighting with the Stars	Paramaribo, Suriname	Decision	3	3:00
2009	Loss	(Turkey) Bahadir Sari		Istanbul, Turkey	KO (left hook)	2	
2009	Loss	(France) Zinedine Hameur-Lain		Contrexéville, France			
For the WPMF European Thai Boxing rules Championship.
2008-08-30	Win	(Netherlands) Fred Sikking	Slamm The Return of the Iron Lady	Paramaribo, Surinam	KO (spinning left high heel kick)	2	
Legend: Win Loss Draw/no contest Notes

== Mixed martial arts record ==
Professional record breakdown
3 matches	0 wins	3 losses
By knockout	0	2
By submission	0	1

Res.	Record	Opponent	Method	Event	Date	Round	Time	Location	Notes
Loss	0–3	Igor Kostin	Submission (rear-naked choke)	Draka - Pro Draka MMA	Nov 24, 2012	3	0:36	Khabarovsk, Russia	
Loss	0–2	Chinto Mordillo	KO	WKN Spain	Apr 5, 2009	1		Barcelona, Spain	
Loss	0–1	Chinto Mordillo	TKO (retirement)	BBT - Black Bull Tournament	Jan 22, 2008	1	1:36	Barcelona, Spain	MMA debut.

== See also ==
- List of male kickboxers
