= 2020 in Glory =

Kickboxing events

Information
- First date: February 29, 2020
- Last date: December 19, 2020

Events
- Total events: 2

Fights
- Total fights: 17
- Title fights: 3

The year 2020 was the ninth year in the history of Glory, an international kickboxing promotion. The year started with Glory 75: Utrecht. Glory 75: Utrecht was broadcast through television agreements with Veronica TV, UFC Fight Pass and other regional channels around the world. Glory 76 was available on pay-per-view.

== List of events ==
#	Event title	Date	Arena	Location
1	Glory 75: Utrecht	February 29, 2020	Central Studios	Utrecht, Netherlands
2	Glory 76: Rotterdam	December 19, 2020	Rotterdam Ahoy	Rotterdam, Netherlands

== Glory 75: Utrecht ==
Glory 75: Utrecht
- Promotion: Glory
- Date: February 29, 2020
- Venue: Central Studios
- City: Utrecht, Netherlands

Event chronology
Glory Collision 2	Glory 75: Utrecht

Glory 75: Utrecht was a kickboxing event held by Glory on February 29, 2020, at the Central Studios in Utrecht, Netherlands.

=== Background ===
This event featured the third fight between the champion Petchpanomrung Kiatmookao and top contender Serhiy Adamchuk for the Glory Featherweight Championship as the Glory 75: Utrecht headliner.

Mohamed Mezouari has been forced to withdraw from his scheduled GLORY 75 co-main event bout with Dmitry Menshikov due to an injury. The bout will be rescheduled to a future Glory card.

=== Results ===
Glory 75
Weight Class				Method	Round	Time	Notes
Featherweight 65 kg	(Thailand) Petchpanomrung Kiatmookao (c)	def.	(Ukraine) Serhiy Adamchuk	Decision (Unanimous)	5	3:00	For the Glory Featherweight Championship
Middleweight 85 kg	(Tunisia) Yousri Belgaroui	def.	(Germany) Jakob Styben	TKO (Doctor Stoppage)	2	1:02	
Lightweight 70 kg	(Morocco) Tyjani Beztati	def.	(France) Michaël Palandre	TKO (Arm Injury)	2	3:00	
Welterweight 77 kg	(England) Jamie Bates	def.	(Armenia) Harut Grigorian	Decision (Unanimous)	3	3:00	
Superfight Series
Light Heavyweight 95 kg	(Lithuania) Sergej Maslobojev	def.	(Netherlands) Roel Mannaart	TKO (Punches)	1	1:48	
Super Bantamweight 55 kg	(France) Anissa Meksen	def.	(South Korea) Ji-Waen Lee	TKO (Knee Injury)	2	3:00	
Lightweight 70 kg	(France) Guerric Billet	def.	(Poland) Artur Saladiak	Decision (Unanimous)	3	3:00	
Lightweight 70 kg	(Brazil) Bruno Gazani	def.	(Belgium) Mohamed Hendouf	Decision (Split)	3	3:00	
Featherweight 65 kg	(Germany) Vincent Foschiani	def.	(South Korea) Si-Jun Jin	Decision (Unanimous)	3	3:00	
Prelims
Featherweight 65 kg	(Spain) Antonio Campoy	def.	(Netherlands) Bowie Zonneveld	Decision (Unanimous)	3	3:00	
Super Bantamweight 55 kg	(Netherlands) Lorena Klijn	def.	(Russia) Almira Tinchurina	Decision (Unanimous)	3	3:00	

== Glory 76: Rotterdam ==
Glory 76: Rotterdam
- Promotion: Glory
- Date: December 19, 2020
- Venue: Rotterdam Ahoy
- City: Rotterdam, Netherlands
- Attendance: None (behind closed doors)

Event chronology
Glory 76: Rotterdam	Glory 77: Rotterdam

Glory 76: Rotterdam, also known as "Badr vs. Benny", was a kickboxing event held by Glory on December 19, 2020, at the Rotterdam Ahoy in Rotterdam, Netherlands. The event was originally planned to take place on June 20 at Ahoy in Rotterdam, Netherlands, but was postponed multiple times due to the COVID-19 pandemic. On September 13, Glory announced the event would take place in the Netherlands on November 7 only for it be postponed again, when Badr Hari announced that he tested positive for COVID-19 on October 19. The event was rescheduled for December 19.

=== Background ===
A Glory Heavyweight title eliminator bout between former two-time Glory Heavyweight Championship challenger and three-time tournament winner Benjamin Adegbuyi and kickboxing legend Badr Hari served as the event headliner.

In the co-main Murthel Groenhart was scheduled to face Cedric Doumbe to unify the Glory Welterweight title, but Groenhart was forced off the card on December 9 with an injury. Doumbe instead faced the former Bellator Kickboxing Welterweight Champion Karim Ghajji, who stepped in on a week notice for this encounter.

The card also featured a four-man heavyweight tournament, with the participants being the #5 ranked Antonio Plazibat, #6 ranked Arkadiusz Wrzosek, #9 ranked Nordine Mahieddine and the new signing Levi Rigters. Wrzosek was later replaced by the #7 ranked Jahfarr Wilnis, as the Pole pulled out due to undisclosed reasons. Wilnis would later pull out as well, and was replaced by the debuting Massinissa Hamaili. Hamaili would himself be replaced by Marciano Bhagwandass, four days before the event.

A Lightweight bout between Damian Johansen and Jos van Belzen was scheduled for the event, but Johansen was forced off the card on December 15 due to illness. Tony Jas served as Johansen replacement, taking the short notice fight against van Belzen.

The card was available for purchase on PPV.

=== Results ===
Glory 76
Weight Class				Method	Round	Time	Notes
Heavyweight 120 kg	(Romania) Benjamin Adegbuyi	def.	(Morocco) Badr Hari	KO (Body kick and Punches)	3	0:50	Glory Heavyweight Championship Eliminator
Heavyweight 120 kg	(Netherlands) Levi Rigters	def.	(France) Nordine Mahieddine	KO (Front kick)	1	1:49	Heavyweight Tournament Final
Welterweight 77 kg	(France) Cédric Doumbé (c)	def.	(France) Karim Ghajji	TKO (Punches)	3	1:30	For the Glory Welterweight Championship
Heavyweight 120 kg	(France) Nordine Mahieddine	def.	(Croatia) Antonio Plazibat	Ext.R Decision (Split)	4	3:00	Heavyweight Tournament Semi-Finals
Heavyweight 120 kg	(Netherlands) Levi Rigters	def.	(Suriname) Marciano Bhagwandass	KO (Body punch)	2	2:42	Heavyweight Tournament Semi-Finals
Prelims
Lightweight 70 kg	(Netherlands) Tony Jas	def.	(Netherlands) Jos van Belzen	Decision (Unanimous)	3	3:00	

=== 2020 Glory Heavyweight Tournament bracket ===
Semi-finals
(Suriname) Marciano Bhagwandass	2r.
(Netherlands) Levi Rigters	KO
(Croatia) Antonio Plazibat	4r.
(France) Nordine Mahieddine	SD

Final
(Netherlands) Levi Rigters	KO
(France) Nordine Mahieddine	1r.

== See also ==
- 2020 in K-1
- 2020 in Kunlun Fight
- 2020 in ONE Championship
- 2020 in Romanian kickboxing
- 2020 in Wu Lin Feng
