= Tariq Osaro =

Nigerian-Dutch kickboxer

- Born: Kevin Tariq Agho Osaro; 12 September 1995 (age 31); Zwolle, Netherlands
- Nickname: Cookie
- Height: 1.98 m (6 ft 6 in)
- Weight: 130.7 kg (288 lb; 20 st 8 lb)
- Division: Heavyweight
- Style: Kickboxing
- Stance: Orthodox
- Fighting out of: Amsterdam, Netherlands
- Team: Mike's Gym (2021-Present); SB Gym (former)
- Trainer: Mike Passenier
- Years active: 2018–Present

Kickboxing record
- Total: 38
- Wins: 31
- By knockout: 18
- Losses: 5
- By knockout: 0
- Draws: 2

Kevin Tariq Agho Osaro (born 12 September 1995) is a Nigerian-Dutch professional kickboxer, currently competing in the heavyweight division of Glory. He also competed for OSS Fighters. As of 1 November 2023, Osaro is ranked the #2 heavyweight in the world by Beyond Kickboxing.

== Career ==
=== Early career ===
Osaro was born in Zwolle, Netherlands and grew up in Amersfoort where he was a football player until his late teens when he discovered kickboxing training during injury recovery. He first fought out of SB Gym before moving to Mike's Gym in October 2021.

At Enfusion 98 on 3 October 2020 Osaro lost to Martin Terpstra by unanimous decision. Osaro won Lazar Todev at next fight. He added significant victory to his record after defeating Cristian Ristea at OSS Fighters 07 in Constanța, Romania.

Osaro took part in Road to ONE: Utrecht, four fighter heavyweight tournament on 2022. He was scheduled to face Tarik Cherkaoui in semifinal. Cherkaoui suffered an injury during the fight, awarding Osaro a technical knockout victory. In final bout of the tournament, Osaro met Badr Ferdaous and defeated him by unanimous decision.

=== Glory ===
Osaro faced fellow Glory debutant Rhys Brudenell at Glory 80 Studio on 14 May 2022. He won the fight by a third-round technical knockout.

Osaro faced the former Enfusion Super Heavyweight champion Levi Rigters at Glory: Collision 4 on 8 October 2022. He lost the fight by unanimous decision, with all five judges scoring the bout 29–28 in favor of Rigters.

Osaro faced Abderrahman Barkouch at Glory: Collision 4 on 5 November 2022. He won the fight by a third-round knockout.

On 29 April 2023, Osaro took part in a four-man heavyweight tournament at Glory 85, held to determine the contender who would face Antonio Plazibat for the interim Glory Heavyweight Championship. In addition, the winner would be guaranteed a spot in the December Glory Heavyweight Grand Prix. Osaro overcame Jahfarr Wilnis by a second-round technical knockout, after knocking him dow four times. In the tournament final, Osaro knocked Murat Aygun out in the third round, with a combination of punches and knees.

Osaro faced Rico Verhoeven in a title unification bout at Glory: Collision 6 on 4 November 2023. He lost the fight by unanimous decision.

Osaro faced Bahram Rajabzadeh in the quarterfinals of the Glory Heavyweight Grand Prix on 9 March 2024. He lost the fight by unanimous decision.

Osaro faced Nico Pereira Horta at Glory 95 on 21 September 2024. He won the fight by unanimous decision.

Osaro took part in the Glory 99 “Heavyweight Last Man Standing Tournament” where 32 heavyweight fighters compete on 5 April 2025 in Rotterdam, Netherlands. He defeated Benjamin Adegbuyi by first round technical knockout in the event.

Osaro next fought Luigj Gashi at Glory 100, in the semifinals of the LHWS Tournament, on 14 June 2025. He won the bout via TKO in the first round, with Gashi retiring from the bout after being given a standing eight count. Osaro next fought Sofian Laidouni, in the Finals of the Qualification Round. He won this bout via TKO in the second round, dropping Laidouni in the first round, before dropping him again in the second round, with this knockdown putting Laidouni out.

Osaro then faced Nidal Bchiri at Glory 105, on 7 February 2026, in the Quarterfinals of the LWHS Finals Tournament. He won the bout via TKO in the second round, facing some adversity with Bchiri's leg kicks, before landing a series of right hooks and crosses that sent Bchiri to the canvas, where the bout was immediately stopped. Osaro then faced Mory Kromah in the Semifinals of the tournament. He lost the bout via unanimous decision, being unable to keep up with Kromah's pace, allowing him to win the decision, subsequently knocking Osaro out of the tournament.

Osaro bounced back from this loss by facing Nico Pereira Horta in a rematch, at Glory 107, on 25 April 2026. He won this bout via unanimous decision, dropping Horta with an uppercut in the first round.

Osaro next faced former Glory Heavyweight Title Challenger Errol Zimmerman, at Glory 109, on September 5, 2026. He won the bout via TKO in the second round, dropping Zimmerman twice in the first round, before doing so again in the second round.

== Championships and accomplishments ==
- Glory
  - 2023 Glory Four-Man Heavyweight Tournament Winner
  - 2023 interim Glory Heavyweight Champion (One time, former)
- ONE Championship
  - 2022 Road to ONE Heavyweight Tournament Winner

== Kickboxing record ==
31 Wins (18 (T)KO's), 5 Losses, 2 Draws
Date	Result	Opponent	Event	Location	Method	Round	Time
2026-09-05	Win	(Curaçao) Errol Zimmerman	Glory 109	Rotterdam, Netherlands	TKO (4 Knockdowns)	2	1:54
2026-04-25	Win	(Cape Verde) Nico Horta	Glory 107	Rotterdam, Netherlands	Decision (Unanimous)	3	3:00
2026-02-07	Loss	(Guinea) Mory Kromah	Glory 105 - Last Heavyweight Standing Finals Tournament, Semifinals	Arnhem, Netherlands	Decision (Unanimous)	3	3:00
2026-02-07	Win	(Morocco) Nidal Bchiri	Glory 105 - Last Heavyweight Standing Finals Tournament, Quarterfinals	Arnhem, Netherlands	KO (Right cross)	2	2:31
2025-06-14	Win	(France) Sofian Laidouni	Glory 100 - Last Heavyweight Standing Qualification Round, Final	Rotterdam, Netherlands	KO (Left hook)	2	0:33
Qualifies for Glory Last Heavyweight Standing Finals Tournament.
2025-06-14	Win	(Albania) Luigj Gashi	Glory 100 - Last Heavyweight Standing Qualification Round, Semifinals	Rotterdam, Netherlands	TKO (retirement)	1	2:10
2025-04-05	Win	(Romania) Benjamin Adegbuyi	Glory 99 - Last Heavyweight Standing, Opening Round	Rotterdam, Netherlands	TKO (Punches)	1	1:59
2024-09-21	Win	(Cape Verde) Nico Horta	Glory 95	Zagreb, Croatia	Decision (Unanimous)	3	3:00
2024-03-09	Loss	(Azerbaijan) Bahram Rajabzadeh	Glory Heavyweight Grand Prix, Quarterfinals	Arnhem, Netherlands	Decision (Unanimous)	3	3:00
2023-11-04	Loss	(Netherlands) Rico Verhoeven	Glory: Collision 6	Arnhem, Netherlands	Decision (Unanimous)	5	3:00
For the Glory Heavyweight Championship.
2023-06-17	Win	(Croatia) Antonio Plazibat	Glory: Collision 5	Rotterdam, Netherlands	KO (Punches and knee)	5	2:08
Won the interim Glory Heavyweight Championship.
2023-04-29	Win	(Turkey) Murat Aygün	Glory 85, Tournament Final	Rotterdam, Netherlands	TKO (Four knockdown rule)	3	2:08
Glory Heavyweight interim title eliminator. Qualifies for the 2024 Glory Heavyweight Grand Prix.
2023-04-29	Win	(Suriname) Jahfarr Wilnis	Glory 85, Tournament Semi Final	Rotterdam, Netherlands	TKO (Knees and punches)	2	1:26
2022-11-05	Win	(Morocco) Abderrahman Barkouch	Glory Rivals 3	Amsterdam, Netherlands	KO (Right hook)	3	2:08
2022-10-08	Loss	(Netherlands) Levi Rigters	Glory: Collision 4	Arnhem, Netherlands	Decision (Unanimous)	3	3:00
2022-05-14	Win	(England) Rhys Brudenell	Glory 80 Studio	Netherlands	TKO (Punches)	3	0:29
2022-03-12	Win	(Morocco) Badr Ferdaous	Road to ONE: Utrecht - Heavyweight Tournament, Final	Utrecht, Netherlands	Decision (Unanimous)	3	3:00
Wins the Road to One Utrecht Heavyweight Tournament.
2022-03-12	Win	(Morocco) Tarik Cherkaoui	Road to ONE: Utrecht - Heavyweight Tournament, Semi Final	Utrecht, Netherlands	TKO (Arm injury)	1	2:20
2021-11-19	Win	(Romania) Cristian Ristea	OSS Fighters 07	Constanța, Romania	Decision (Unanimous)	3	3:00
2021-10-24	Win	(Suriname) Marciano Bhugwandass	Akira FC	The Hague, Netherlands	Decision (Unanimous)	5	3:00
Wins the Dutch Muay Thai Heavyweight title.
2021-09-18	Win	(Latvia) Reinis Porozovs	KOK 92	Riga, Latvia	KO (Right cross)	1	1:46
2021-07-16	Win	(Bulgaria) Lazar Todev	Enfusion Cage Events 5	Alkmaar, Netherlands	Decision (Unanimous)	3	3:00
2021-07-04	Draw	(Belgium) Asdren Gashi	Fight for Honor VII	Brussels, Belgium	Decision	3	3:00
2020-10-03	Loss	(Netherlands) Martin Terpstra	Enfusion 98	Alkmaar, Netherlands	Decision (Unanimous)	3	3:00
2019-03-03	Draw	(Netherlands) Elder Garcia	Next Generation Warriors 8	The Hague, Netherlands	Decision	3	3:00
2018-11-03	Win	(Georgia (country)) Shota Dolidze	Global Fights Holland II	The Hague, Netherlands	Decision	5	3:00
Legend: Win Loss Draw/No contest Notes
