= Muharrem Hasani =

Swiss kickboxer (born 1985)

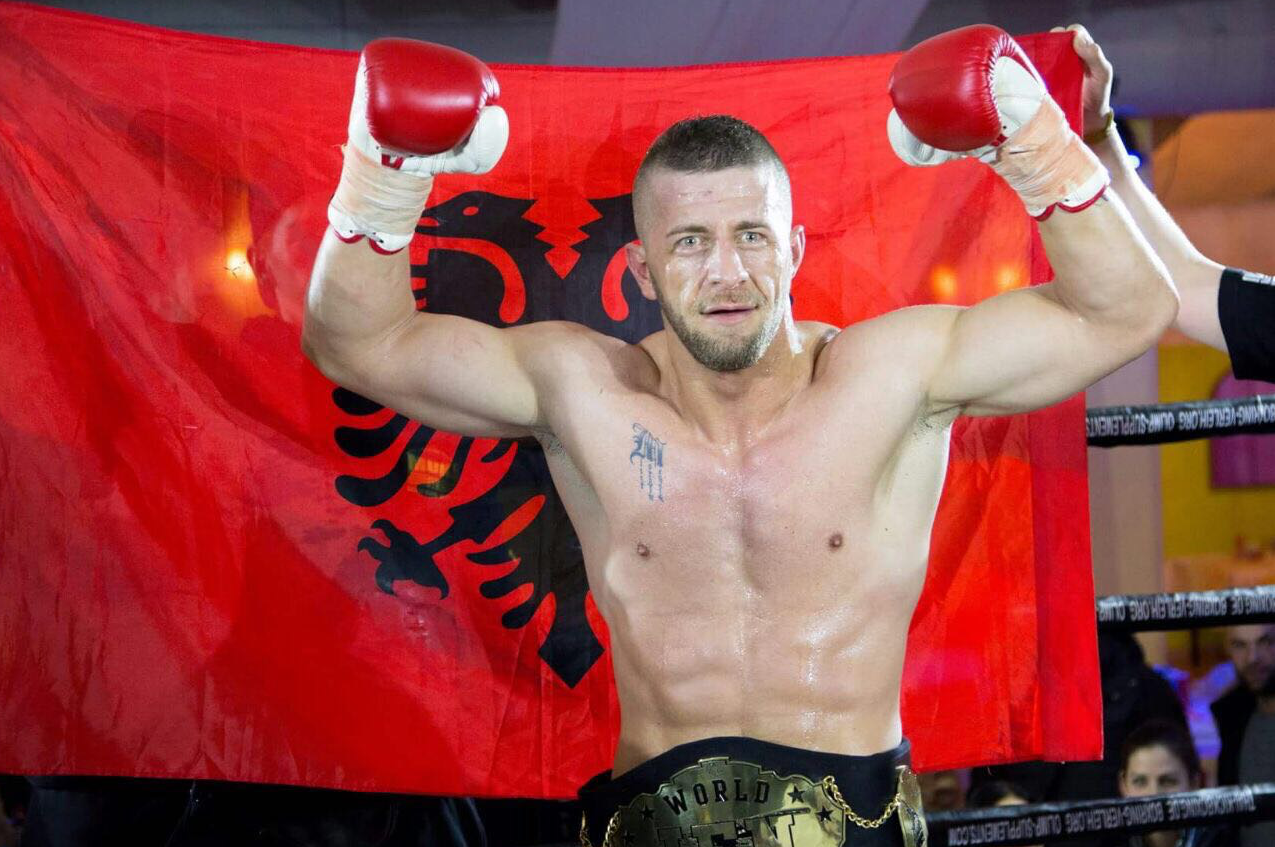
- Born: 6 May 1985 (age 41); Province of Kosovo, Yugoslavia
- Nationality: Switzerland
- Height: 1.85 m (6 ft 1 in)
- Weight: 95 kg (209 lb; 15.0 st)
- Division: Heavyweight
- Style: Kickboxing • Muay Thai
- Fighting out of: Zürich, Switzerland
- Years active: 2000-present

Kickboxing record
- Total: 56
- Wins: 51
- By knockout: 28
- Losses: 5
- By knockout: 1
- Draws: 0

Other information
- Website: muharremhasani.com

Muharrem Hasani (born May 6, 1985) is a Swiss kickboxer who competes in the heavyweight division. In 2000, Hasani became Swiss Junior Champion for the first time and in 2002 he acquired the title of junior world champion in karate. In 2004, he won the title of Elite Amateur Swiss champion in full contact kickboxing.

== Career ==
Hasani came to Switzerland at the age of 14. At 15, he began his career as a Thai boxer and kick boxer. Wanting a new challenge, he began training in kickboxing.

In 2005, Hasani got into professional sport and became European champion in Thai boxing in the 95 kg weight class at the age of 20, as well as the following year.

In 2007, Hasani won the title of Intercontinental Champion in Thai boxing and in 2008, he was the winner of the prestige fight. In 2009 he was the WPKC world champion (World Professional Kickboxing Council) in Thai boxing. When Hasani was 28 years old in 2013, he received the title of WKF Vice-World Champion. A year later he won the title of WFC World Champion.

Hasani decided in April 2010 to open a kickboxing school (Muki Gym). He is the coach and active fighter.
