= Ramazan Ramazanov =

Russian kickboxer (born 1984)

- Born: June 22, 1984 (age 42); Makhachkala, Dagestan ASSR, Russian SFSR, Soviet Union
- Native name: Рамазан Рамазанов
- Other names: The Punisher
- Nationality: Russian
- Height: 1.90 m (6 ft 3 in)
- Weight: 95 kg (209 lb; 15.0 st)
- Division: Heavyweight
- Style: Muay Thai, Kickboxing
- Fighting out of: Bangkok, Thailand
- Team: Team Mr. Perfect; Rompo Gym
- Trainer: Ernesto Hoost, Magomed Magomedov, Arslan Magomedov
- Years active: 2002–present

Kickboxing record
- Total: 67
- Wins: 53
- By knockout: 32
- Losses: 12
- By knockout: 4
- Draws: 1
- No contests: 1

Amateur record
- Total: 64
- Wins: 54
- By knockout: 44
- Losses: 8
- Draws: 2
- Last updated on: December 16, 2012

Ramazan Ramazanov (born 22 June 1984 in Makhachkala, Dagestan, Russia) is a Russian Muay Thai fighter and kickboxer.

He is a former WPMF World Heavyweight champion and a winner of the S-1 Muay Thai tournament in Thailand.

== Biography and career ==
Ramazan was born in Makhachkala, Dagestan, and started boxing when he was 13 years old. At the age of 15, he fell in love with Muay Thai. In 2004 he moved to Thailand with his cousins Arslan and Magomed Magomedov to pursue his Muay Thai career. He settled in Bangkok at Rompo Gym. Within a few years he moved up from the Super Middleweight to Super Cruiserweight division.

He had his first fight in Thailand at the age of 19 and won his first World title in 2004. On December 5, 2006, Ramazan participated in the S1 World Heavyweight tournament, held in Bangkok, on the King's Birthday. Two decision victories over Emmanuel Payet and Jafar Ahmadi sent him to the finals, where he was able to defeat Belarusian Marek Dimitriov by low kicks in the second round.

One month later, on January 5, 2007, in Dubai, U.A.E. Ramazan knocked out Dutchman Evert Fyeet in the fourth round to claim the WMC Middle East Title.

On December 8, 2007 in Sydney, Australia Ramazan stopped Steve McKinnon in the 4th round and claimed the WMC Intercontinental Muay Thai Heavyweight title.

On July 19, 2008 in Cape Town, South Africa Ramazan became the new WPMF Heavyweight World Champion by beating Pete Motaung, the local favorite, in the 2nd-round TKO win.

He defeated Fabian Gondorf by decision at Fight Nights: Battle of Moscow 9 on December 16, 2012.

== Titles ==
- World Professional Muaythai Federation (WPMF)
  - 2012 WPMF World Heavyweight Champion (Phuket, Bangla stadium)
  - 2008 WPMF World Heavyweight Champion (Cape Town)
  - 2004 WPMF World Champion (Bangkok)
- World Muaythai Council (WMC)
  - 2007 WMC Intercontinental Muay Thai Heavyweight Champion (Sydney)
  - 2007 WMC Middle East Muay Thai Heavyweight Champion (Dubai)
  - 2005 WMC World Champion (Bangkok)
- Onesongchai Promotion
  - 2006 Winner of S-1 Heavyweight Tournament (Bangkok)
- PK-1
  - 2006 PK-1 World Champion (Phuket)
- King's Birthday
  - 2004 King's Birthday 83 kg Tournament Final (Bangkok)
- International Federation of Muaythai Associations (IFMA)
  - 2004 IFMA World Championship 🥉 75 kg
  - 2003 IFMA Russian Championship 🥇75 kg

== Kickboxing record ==
Kickboxing record
51 Wins (32 (T)KO's, 20 decisions), 12 Losses (3 (T)KO's, 8 decisions, 1 disqualification), 1 Draws
Date	Result	Opponent	Event	Location	Method	Round	Time
2012-12-16	Win	(Netherlands) Fabian Gondorf	Fight Nights: Battle at Moscow 9	Moscow, Russia	Decision	3	3:00
2012-06-07	Win	(Guinea) Mamoudou Keta	Fight Nights: Battle of Moscow 7	Moscow, Russia	Decision (Unanimous)	3	3:00
2012-03-08	Loss	(Guinea) Mamoudou Keta	Fight Nights: Battle of Moscow 6	Moscow, Russia	KO (Right High Kick)	2	
2011-10-08	Win	(England) Chris Knowles	Muay Thai Premier League: Second Round	Padua, Italy	KO		
2011-02-05	Loss	(Curaçao) Wendell Roche	Enfusion Kickboxing Tournament '11, 2nd Round	Koh Samui, Thailand	Ext.R Decision	4	3:00
2011-02-01	Win	(Netherlands) Revanho Blokland	Enfusion Kickboxing Tournament '11, 2nd Round	Koh Samui, Thailand	KO (Punches)	2	
2010-07-29	Loss	(Belarus) Vitali Akhramenko	Tatneft Arena World Cup 2010 1/2 final (+80 kg)	Kazan, Russia	Decision	3	3:00
2010-06-11	NC	(Hong Kong) Alain Ngalani	Planet Battle VI	Wanchai, Hong Kong	No Contest	2	
2010-05-21	Win	(Thailand)	Fury I - Clash of the Titans	Macau	TKO	1	
2010-04-30	Win	(Ukraine) Dmitri Bezus	Tatneft Arena World Cup 2010 1/4 final (+80 kg)	Kazan, Russia	Decision (Unanimous)	3	3:00
2010-02-10	Win	(Uruguay) Carlos Correa	Tatneft Arena World Cup 2010 1/8 final (+80 kg)	Kazan, Russia	Decision (Unanimous)	3	3:00
2010-01-16	Win	(Brazil) Eduardo Maiorino	Thailand vs Challenger Series, Royal Paragon Hall	Bangkok, Thailand	KO (Right high kick)	1	
2009-11-07	Win	(Serbia) Nemanja Ulardzic	I-1 World Muaythai Grand Extreme	Macau	Decision (Unanimous)	3	3:00
2009-08-11	Loss	(Netherlands) Melvin Manhoef	K-1 World Grand Prix 2009 in Tokyo Final 16 Qualifying GP	Tokyo, Japan	KO (Punch)	1	2:16
2009-06-04	Win	(Japan) Ryuta Noji	Planet Battle Queen Elizabeth Stadium	Wanchai, Hong Kong	Decision (Unanimous)	3	3:00
2008-10-04	Win	(United Kingdom) Chris Braveheart	Battle To Be King, Fairtex Thepprasit Stadium	Pattaya, Thailand	KO (Low kicks)	2	
2008-07-19	Win	(South Africa) Pete Motaung	Sons of Africa, WPMF Heavyweight title 95 kg+	Cape Town, South Africa	TKO (Knee)	2	
Wins WPMF World Heavyweight title.
2008-03-29	Loss	(Australia) Ben Edwards	Xplosion 18 Super Fights	Sydney, Australia	KO (Hook)	2	
2007-12-27	Win	(France) Yoann Gouaida	Battle on Bali FC	Bali, Indonesia	KO (Punches)	5	
2007-12-08	Win	(Australia) Steve McKinnon	Xplosion 17, WMC Intercontinental title 95 kg	Sydney, Australia	KO (Right hook)	4	2:51
Wins WMC Intercontinental Muay Thai Heavyweight title.
2007-06-02	Win	(Belarus) Marek Dimitriov	Fury in Macau	Macau	KO (Left hook)	3	0:42
2007-05-19	Loss	(Kazakhstan) Teodor Sariyev	K-1 Scandinavia GP 2007	Stockholm, Sweden	KO (Right hook)	2	0:57
2007-04-30	Win	(South Korea) Baek Si Wang	WMC I-1 World Muaythai Grand Prix 2007	Wanchai, Hong Kong	KO (Low kicks)	2	
2007-01-04	Win	(Netherlands) Evert Fyeet	War On The Shore Episode-1	Dubai, U.A.E.	KO (Low kicks)	4	
Wins WMC Middle East Muay Thai Heavyweight title.
2006-12-05	Win	(Belarus) Marek Dimitriov	King's Cup WMC S-1 Heavyweight Tournament	Bangkok, Thailand	Decision	3	3:00
Wins S-1 Heavyweight tournament.
2006-12-05	Win	(Iran) Jafar Ahmadi	King's Cup WMC S-1 Heavyweight Tournament	Bangkok, Thailand	Decision	3	3:00
2006-12-05	Win	(France) Emmanuel Payet	King's Cup WMC S-1 Heavyweight Tournament	Bangkok, Thailand	Decision	3	3:00
2006-11-11	Win	(South Korea) Shin Kyum Kim	Macau Xplosion	Macau	KO (Spinning elbow)	2	1:30
2006-08-18	Win	(United Kingdom) Will Riva	Xplosion	Sydney, Australia	KO	1	
2006-04-12	Win	(Thailand) Ekapon	Theprasit Stadium	Pattaya, Thailand	KO (Left hook)	1	0:30
2005-12-05	Loss	(United Kingdom) Stephan Thomas	King's Cup S-1 World Championship	Bangkok, Thailand	Decision	5	3:00
2005-11-18	Loss	(Czech Republic) Jan Antolik	Philip Lam & Lee Gar 30th Anniversary	Auckland, New Zealand	Decision	5	3:00
2005-10-28	Win	(Thailand) Leonard Sitpholek	Lumpinee Stadium	Bangkok, Thailand	Decision	5	3:00
2005-07-23	Win	(New Zealand) Warren Elson	Muay Thai Warriors Supa Fight 3	Sunshine Coast, Australia	Decision	5	3:00
2005-06-24	Loss	(Czech Republic) Jan Antolik	NZ vs Russia & Thailand	Auckland, New Zealand	Decision	5	3:00
2005-06-19	Win	(Thailand) Wanlop Sitpholek	Thammasat University	Bangkok, Thailand	Decision	5	3:00
2005-02-12	Loss	(Thailand) Chaowalit Jockygym	Songchai Tsunami Event	Bangkok, Thailand	Decision	5	3:00
2004-12-18	Loss	(New Zealand) Shane Chapman	K-1 Challenge 2004 Oceania vs World	Gold Coast, Australia	Decision	3	3:00
2004-12-05	Win	(Thailand) Makadam	King's Birthday 2004	Bangkok, Thailand	Decision	3	3:00
Wins King's Birthday 2004 83 kg tournament.
2004-12-05	Win	(Sweden) Fredrik Rosenberg	King's Birthday 2004	Bangkok, Thailand	TKO	1	
2004-11-23	Loss	(Thailand) Apichai To Papadang	Lumpinee Muaythai Gala 2	Helsinki, Finland	Decision	5	3:00
2004-10-09	Win	(Thailand) Leonard Sitpholek	Muaythailumpineekrikkri Fights, Lumpinee Stadium	Bangkok, Thailand	Decision	5	3:00
Legend: Win Loss Draw/No contest Notes

== See also ==
- List of male kickboxers
- List of K-1 events
