= Michael Duut =

Dutch kickboxer

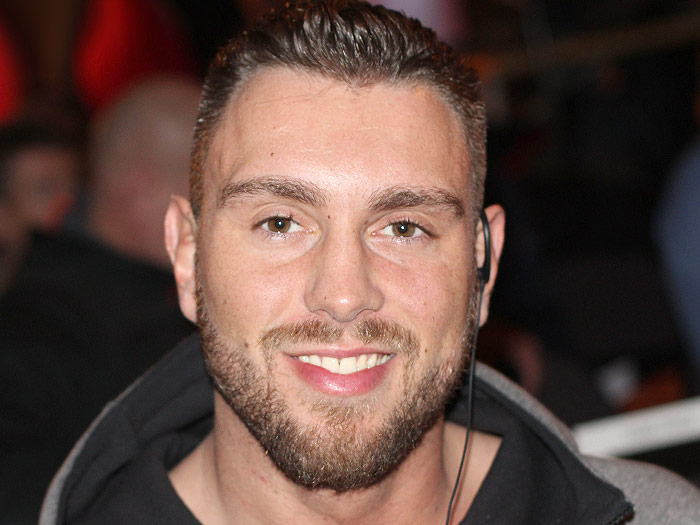
- Born: Michael Danny Duut; 22 January 1990 (age 36); Groningen, Netherlands
- Other names: The Dream Crusher
- Height: 1.91 m (6 ft 3 in)
- Weight: 95.0 kg (209 lb; 14 st 13 lb)
- Division: Light Heavyweight; Heavyweight
- Reach: 78.0 in (198 cm)
- Style: Kickboxing
- Stance: Orthodox
- Fighting out of: Netherlands
- Team: Beast of the East
- Trainer: Faldir Chahbari (2021–present); Melvin Manhoef (2014–2021); Stefan Berkenpas & Andre Mannaart (former); Gert Flik (former)

Kickboxing record
- Total: 59
- Wins: 44
- By knockout: 21
- Losses: 14
- Draws: 1
- Last updated on: 10 December 2016

Michael Duut (born 22 January 1990) is a Dutch kickboxer. He is known for his aggressive fighting style. He is the 2017 Glory Light Heavyweight Contender Tournament Winner.

He is ranked a top ten Light Heavyweight. He once again entered the rankings in April 2013, He made brief appearances in the top ten between 2013 until 2021 and November.

== Early life ==
Duut started kickboxing when he was 10 years old after being bullied at school. After a fight at school with an older boy his father made him to go back and fight again. According to him and his father he knocked the guy unconscious. His father sent him to kickboxing classes after that.

Duut is fighting out of Mejiro Gym since his early teens.

== Kickboxing career ==
On 23 March 2013 Duut fought Dustin Jacoby at Glory 5: London, winning by TKO in the first round. On 20 April 2013 he defeated Australian Steve McKinnon by unanimous decision at Glory 7: Milan.

Duut was part of the Light Heavyweight Tournament Glory 9: New York - 2013 95kg Slam on 22 June 2013, losing in the first match to Tyrone Spong. Duut created an upset by dropping tournament favourite Spong in the first found, but was KO'd seconds later.

On 12 October 2013 he fought at Glory 11: Chicago where he lost in round 1 by TKO due to arm injury to Glory contender Danyo Ilunga.

Duut lost his third fight in a row on 8 March 2014 at Glory 14: Zagreb by KO in round 1 to Igor Jurković.

He broke the losing streak during the North vs. the Rest event, when he won a unanimous decision over Andre Schmeling. He won his next fight as well, as his opponent Nikolaj Falin suffered an injury in the first round.

Duut's next fight was against Danyo Ilunga during Glory 36. The fight, hailed as the "Fight of the Year" by Croring.com, went into as extra round, where Duut won a decision. Combat Press voted the bout their "2016 Comeback of the Year".

Riding a three fight winning streak, Duut fought Fred Sikking at WFL - Champion vs Champion. Sikking won the fight by a first-round KO.

Despite losing his next fight to Mourad Bouzidi as well, he was granted a berth in the Glory Light Heavyweight Contender tournament. Duut scored KO wins over Dragoș Zubco in the semifinal and Manny Mancha in the final to win the tournament.

He is scheduled to fight Stéphane Susperregui during Glory 76: Antwerp.

== Championships and accomplishments ==
- 2016 Combat Press "Comeback of the Year" vs. Danyo Ilunga
- 2017 Glory Light Heavyweight Contender Tournament Winner

== Kickboxing record ==
Professional kickboxing record
43 wins (21 (T)KOs, 22 decisions), 15 losses, 1 draw
Date	Result	Opponent	Event	Location	Method	Round	Time
2023-04-29	Loss	(Morocco) Mohamed Amine	Glory 85	Rotterdam, Netherlands	Decision (unanimous)	3	3:00
2021-10-23	Win	(United States) John King	Glory: Collision 3	Arnhem, Netherlands	KO (knee)	2	1:07
2019-12-21	Loss	(Brazil) Ariel Machado	Glory Collision 2	Arnhem, Netherlands	Decision (unanimous)	3	3:00
2019-10-12	Loss	(Cape Verde) Luis Tavares	Glory 69: Düsseldorf	Düsseldorf, Germany	Decision (unanimous)	3	3:00
2019-04-09	Loss	(Suriname) Donegi Abena	Glory 64: Strasbourg	Strasbourg, France	Decision (split)	3	3:00
2018-09-29	Win	(Tunisia) Mourad Bouzidi	Glory 59: Amsterdam	Amsterdam, Netherlands	KO (punch)	3	2:56
2018-05-12	Loss	(France) Zinedine Hameur-Lain	Glory 53: Lille	Lille, France	TKO (right hook)	2	1:14
2017-12-09	Loss	(Democratic Republic of the Congo) Danyo Ilunga	Glory 49: Rotterdam	Rotterdam, Netherlands	KO (punch)	3	2:26
2017-09-30	Win	(United States) Manny Mancha	Glory 45: Amsterdam, Final	Amsterdam, Netherlands	KO (punch)	1	0:12
Wins the Glory Light Heavyweight Contender Tournament.
2017-09-30	Win	(Moldova) Dragoș Zubco	Glory 45: Amsterdam, Semi Finals	Amsterdam, Netherlands	KO (punch)	1	0:36
2017-05-20	Loss	(Tunisia) Mourad Bouzidi	Glory 41: Holland	Den Bosch, Netherlands	DQ (3 point deductions)	2	2:18
2017-04-23	Loss	(Netherlands) Fred Sikking	WFL - Champion vs. Champion	Almere, Netherlands	KO	1	
2016-12-10	Win	(Democratic Republic of the Congo) Danyo Ilunga	Glory 36: Oberhausen	Oberhausen, Germany	Ext. R. decision (unanimous)	4	3:00
2016-11-20	Win	(Germany) Nikolaj Falin	Enfusion Live 43	Groningen, Netherlands	TKO (injury)	1	
2015-03-28	Win	(Germany) Andre Schmeling	North vs. the Rest	Leek, Netherlands	Decision (unanimous)	3	3:00
2014-03-08	Loss	(Croatia) Igor Jurković	Glory 14: Zagreb	Zagreb, Croatia	KO	1	1:14
2013-10-12	Loss	(Democratic Republic of the Congo) Danyo Ilunga	Glory 11: Chicago	Hoffman Estates, Illinois, USA	TKO (arm injury)	1	2:23
2013-06-22	Loss	(Suriname) Tyrone Spong	Glory 9: New York - 95 kg Slam Tournament, Quarter Finals	New York City, New York, USA	KO (right hook)	1	0:31
2013-04-20	Win	(Australia) Steve McKinnon	Glory 7: Milan	Milan, Italy	Decision (unanimous)	3	3:00
2013-03-23	Win	(United States) Dustin Jacoby	Glory 5: London	London, England	TKO (referee stoppage)	1	2:25
2012-11-24	Win	(Netherlands) Ricardo van den Bos	2 the MAXX	Hoogeveen, Netherlands	KO	3	
2012-05-12	Loss	(Albania) Rustemi Kreshnik	Siam Gym Belgium presents: It's Showtime 56	Kortrijk, Belgium	TKO (referee stoppage)	1	3:00
2012-03-10	Win	(Serbia) Stefan Jelić	Cro Cop Final Fight	Zagreb, Croatia	Decision (unanimous)	3	3:00
2012-01-28	Loss	(Brazil) Anderson Silva	It's Showtime 2012 in Leeuwarden	Leeuwarden, Netherlands	Decision (unanimous)	3	3:00
2011-10-30	Win	(Suriname) Jairzinho Rozenstruik	Kickboksgala Kalverdijkje	Leeuwarden, Netherlands	Decision	3	3:00
2010-12-12	Win	(Netherlands) Koos Wessels	2 the MAXX	Hoogeveen, Netherlands	TKO (corner stoppage)	3	
2010-10-09	Loss	(Netherlands) Rico Verhoeven	Ring Rage V	Assen, Netherlands	Decision	3	3:00
2010-05-22	Win	(Turkey) Hakim Abdy	2 the MAXX	Assen, Netherlands	KO	1	
2010-03-28	Win	(Russia) Waldemar Newdach	Ring Rage IV	Groningen, Netherlands	KO	1	
2009-10-04	Win	(Spain) Frank Muñoz	Ring Rage III	Groningen, Netherlands	Decision	3	3:00
2008-08-30	Loss	(Angola) Henriques Zowa	North Against South part 3	Leek, Netherlands	TKO	2	
Legend: Win Loss Draw/no contest Notes

== See also ==
- List of male kickboxers
