= Henriques Zowa =

Angolan-Dutch kickboxer

- Born: August 19, 1981 (age 45); Luanda, Angola
- Nationality: Angolan; Dutch
- Height: 1.83 m (6 ft 0 in)
- Weight: 95 kg (209 lb; 14 st 13 lb)
- Division: Heavyweight
- Style: Muay Thai
- Stance: Orthodox
- Fighting out of: Almere, Netherlands
- Team: Simson Gym (current); Team Hardcore (former)
- Years active: 2003-present

Kickboxing record
- Total: 45
- Wins: 32
- By knockout: 12
- Losses: 11
- Draws: 2

Other information
- Website: http://www.henriqueszowa.nl
- Boxing record from BoxRec
- Last updated on: December 15, 2011

Henriques Zowa (born August 19, 1981) is an Angolan-Dutch professional kickboxer and boxer, fighting out of Simson Gym in Almere, Netherlands.

== Career ==
He challenged Nathan Corbett for his WKN World Heavyweight (-96.6 kg/213 lb) Muay Thai Championship at Total Carnage IV in Gold Coast, Australia on December 14, 2013, and lost the fight by second round TKO.

== Titles ==
- Kickboxing
  - K-1 Canarias 2005 Tournament Champion
- Boxing
  - Bigger's Better King 2011 Tournament Runner up

== Kickboxing record (Incomplete) ==
Kickboxing record
32 Wins (12 (T) KO's), 2 Draws, 11 Losses
Date	Result	Opponent	Event	Location	Method	Round	Time
2017-10-29	Loss	(Turkey) Murat Aygun	WFL: Manhoef vs. Bonjasky, Final 16	Almere, Netherlands	Decision	3	3:00
2013-12-14	Loss	(Australia) Nathan Corbett	Total Carnage IV	Gold Coast, Australia	TKO (Left elbow)	2	1:47
For W.K.N. Muay Thai World title -95kg.
2011-07-16	Loss	(Romania) Andrei Stoica	SUPERKOMBAT World Grand Prix II 2011	Constanța, Romania	Decision (Unanimous)	3	3:00
2011-07-04	Draw	(Suriname) Redouan Cairo	Death Before Dishonor	Almere, Netherlands	Draw	3	3:00
2010-10-09	Win	(Democratic Republic of the Congo) Danyo Ilunga	Mix Fight Gala 10	Darmstadt, Germany	TKO (Referee stoppage)	3	N/A
2010-09-24	Loss	(Netherlands) Thiago Martina	Amsterdam fight club, Semi Finals	Amsterdam, Netherlands	Decision	3	3:00
2010-05-08	Win	(Netherlands) Ismael Londt	Fight Masters	Almere, Netherlands	TKO (Strikes)	N/A	N/A
2009-03-01	Win	(Suriname) Clyde van Dams	K-1 World MAX 2009 Europe Tournament	Utrecht, Netherlands	Decision (Unanimous)	3	3:00
2008-08-30	Win	(Netherlands) Michael Duut	Slamm The Return of the Iron Lady		TKO (Strikes)	2	N7A
2008-06-15	Loss	(Tunisia) Mourad Bouzidi	Rumble in the Hague	The Hague, Netherlands	Decision (Unanimous)	5	3:00
Fight was for WFCA Dutch Muaythai Super Heavyweight (+95 kg) title.
2008-05-31	Loss	(Czech Republic) Tomáš Hron	Muay Thai Fight Night	Switzerland	Decision (Unanimous)	3	3:00
2008-4	Loss	(Turkey) Bahadir Sari	World Champions League	Turkey	Decision	5	3:00
2008-03-15	Win	(Morocco) Samir Benazzouz	It's Showtime 75MAX Trophy 2008	's-Hertogenbosch, Netherlands	Decision	3	3:00
2007-11-24	Win	(Turkey) Mutlu Karabulut	Only the Strongest 2007	Ter Apel, Netherlands	TKO (Leg Kicks)	2	
2007-10-14	Loss	(Suriname) Ashwin Balrak	The Battle of Arnhem 6	Arnhem, Netherlands	Decision (Unanimous)	3	3:00
2005-04-02	Loss	(Portugal) Humberto Evora	K-1 Canarias 2006, Quarter Final	Santa Cruz de Tenerife, Canary Islands	Decision	3	3:00
2006-05-18	Loss	(Turkey) Gökhan Saki	Gala in Vlaardingen	Vlaardingen, Netherlands	Decision (Unanimous)	5	3:00
2005-10-02	Loss	(Curaçao) Errol Zimmerman	Gentlemen Fight Night 2	Tilburg, Netherlands	Decision (Unanimous)	5	3:00
2005-04-02	Win	(Curaçao) Errol Zimmerman	K-1 Canarias 2005, Final	Tenerife, Canary Islands	Decision (Unanimous)	3	3:00
Won the K-1 Canarias 2005 tournament title.
2005-04-02	Win	(Turkey) Mutlu Karbulut	K-1 Canarias 2005, Semi Finals	Tenerife, Canary Islands	KO (Punch to the Body)	N/A	N/A
2005-04-02	Win	(Spain) Hichan	K-1 Canarias 2005, Quarter Final	Tenerife, Canary Islands	KO (Knees)	N/A	N/A
Legend: Win Loss Draw/No contest Notes

== See also ==
- List of K-1 events
- List of male boxers
- List of male kickboxers
