= Rickard Nordstrand =

Swedish kickboxer (born 1976)

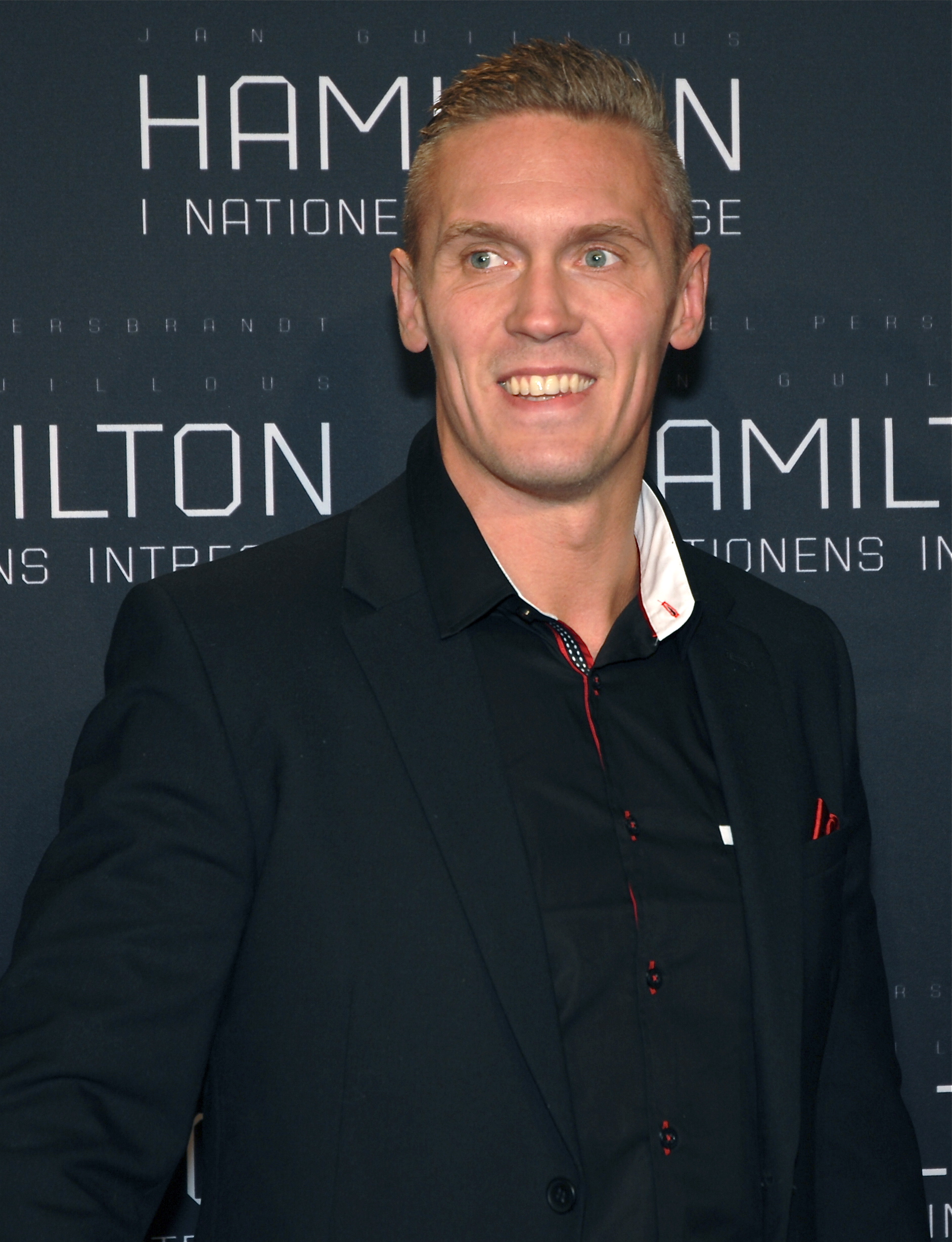
- Rickard Nordstrand at the gala premiere of Hamilton - In the Interest of the Nation, Stockholm, January 9, 2012.
- Born: March 14, 1976 (age 50); Vallentuna, Sweden
- Nationality: (Sweden) Swedish
- Height: 1.82 m (5 ft 11 1/2 in)
- Weight: 82 kg (181 lb; 12.9 st)
- Division: Light Heavyweight
- Style: Muay Thai
- Fighting out of: Vallentuna
- Team: Vallentuna Boxing Camp

Kickboxing record
- Total: 37
- Wins: 27
- By knockout: 7
- Losses: 8
- By knockout: 1
- Draws: 2
- Last updated on: August 17, 2013

Rickard Nordstrand (born March 14, 1976) is a Swedish Light Heavyweight kickboxer competing in K-1.

== Biography and career ==
He knocked out Sem Braan in round two at Fight Night 08 in Stockholm, Sweden on August 17, 2013.

== Titles and accomplishments ==
- 2009 WMC World Light Heavyweight Champion
- 2004 IFMA Amateur World Cruiserweight Champion
- 1999 WKA Amateur Kickboxing World Championship 3rd Place
- Five time IFMA Swedish Muay Thai Champion
- 2004 K-1 World Grand Prix Preliminary Scandinavia Finalist
- 2006 K-1 Scandinavia Grand Prix in Stockholm Finalist

== Film and television ==
Nordstrand has also worked with film productions as stunt double and fighting coordinator for the actor Mikael Persbrandt in the spy/action Hamilton film series. He will portray a warrior in the third season of the popular TV drama Game of Thrones and also has an unnamed project with Brad Pitt lined up.

== Kickboxing record ==
Kickboxing Record
27 Wins (9 KO's, 18 decisions), 8 Losses, 2 Draws
Date	Result	Opponent	Event	Location	Method	Round	Time	Record
2013-08-17	Win	(Netherlands) Sem Braan	Fight Night 08	Stockholm, Sweden	KO (punches)	2	1:34	27–8–2
2010-12-11	Win	(Czech Republic) Jiri Zak	K-1 Scandinavia Rumble of the Kings 2010	Stockholm, Sweden	Decision (3–0)	3	3:00	26–8–2
2009-09-20	Win	(Canada) Clifton Brown	K-1 Scandinavia Rumble of the Kings 2009	Stockholm, Sweden	TKO (Referee stoppage)	2		25–8–2
Wins WMC Muaythai World Light Heavyweight title.
2009-05-22	Win	(England) Alex Dally	K-1 Scandinavia Rumble of the Kings 2009 Qualification	Malmo, Sweden	TKO	2	2:43	24–8–2
2007-08-11	Loss	(United States) Patrick Barry	K-1 World GP 2007 in Las Vegas	Las Vegas, Nevada	TKO (Low kicks)	2	2:16	23–8–2
2007-05-19	Loss	(Suriname) Ashwin Balrak	K-1 Scandinavia Grand Prix 2006	Stockholm, Sweden	Decision (3–0)	3	3:00	23–7–2
2007-05-19	Win	(Germany) Goran Vidakovic	K-1 Scandinavia Grand Prix 2006	Stockholm, Sweden	KO (Right hook)	2	2:50	23–6–2
2006-11-24	Draw	(Russia) Magomed Magomedov	K-1 World MAX North European Qualification 2007	Stockholm, Sweden	Ext. R Decision (0-0)	4	3:00	
2006-05-20	Loss	(Russia) Magomed Magomedov	K-1 Scandinavia Grand Prix 2006	Stockholm, Sweden	Decision (3–0)	3	3:00	
2006-05-20	Win	(Finland) Topi Helin	K-1 Scandinavia Grand Prix 2006	Stockholm, Sweden	Decision (3–0)	3	3:00	
2006-05-20	Win	(Japan) Tsutomu Takahagi	K-1 Scandinavia Grand Prix 2006	Stockholm, Sweden	KO	3		
2005-09-23	Loss	(Russia) Ruslan Karaev	K-1 World Grand Prix 2005	Osaka, Japan	Decision (3–0)	3	3:00	
2005-07-29	Loss	(Japan) Musashi	K-1 World Grand Prix 2005 in Hawaii	Honolulu, Hawaii	Decision (2–0)	3	3:00	
2005-05-21	Loss	(Netherlands) Remy Bonjasky	K-1 Scandinavia Grand Prix 2005	Stockholm, Sweden	Decision (3–0)	3	3:00	
2004-05-31	Win	(Russia) Artur Skamkalov	IFMA Muay Thai World Championships 2004	Bangkok, Thailand				
Wins IFMA Muay Thai World Championships -86kg gold medal.
2004-05-31	Win		IFMA Muay Thai World Championships 2004	Bangkok, Thailand				
2004-05-31	Win		IFMA Muay Thai World Championships 2004	Bangkok, Thailand				
2004-05-31	Win		IFMA Muay Thai World Championships 2004	Bangkok, Thailand				
2004-02-14	Loss	(Belgium) Brecht Wallis	K-1 Scandinavia 2004 World Qualification	Stockholm, Sweden	TKO (Corner stoppage)	3	3:00	
2004-02-14	Win	(Slovakia) Roman Kupcak	K-1 Scandinavia 2004 World Qualification	Stockholm, Sweden	Decision (3–0)	3	3:00	
2004-02-14	Win	(Sweden) Jorgen Himmerstal	K-1 Scandinavia 2004 World Qualification	Stockholm, Sweden	TKO	1	0:54	
2003	Win	(Serbia) Misa Baculov		Stockholm, Sweden	Decision (3–0)	5	2:00	
2001-06-09	Win	(Iran) Ali Reza	K-1 Scandinavia Grand Prix 2001	Copenhagen, Denmark	Decision (2–0)	5	3:00	
Legend: Win Loss Draw/No contest Notes

== See also ==
- List of male kickboxers
- List of K-1 Events
