= Slavo Polugić =

Slavo Polugic
- Born: April 2, 1983 (age 43)
- Other names: The Iron Knee
- Nationality: Swiss
- Height: 1.97 m (6 ft 6 in)
- Division: Heavyweight
- Style: Thai Boxing; Kickboxing
- Fighting out of: Amsterdam, Netherlands
- Team: Wing Thai Gym (2002-?); Mike's Gym (2010-present)
- Trainer: Rohy Batliwala (2002-?); Mike Passenier (2010-present)

Kickboxing record
- Total: 41
- Wins: 32
- By knockout: 20
- Losses: 7
- Draws: 1
- No contests: 1
- Last updated on: April 17, 2012

Slavo Polugic (born April 2, 1983) is a Swiss heavyweight kickboxer of Serbian and Croatian descent. He is known for his knee strikes, hence the nickname of "The Iron Knee". He has an excellent physical condition and a variable fighting style.

== Titles ==
- 2011 WFC World Fighters Council Champion +95 kg
- 2010 WKN Oriental Rules Super Heavyweight World Champion +96,600 kg
- 2009 WKN Oriental Rules Super Heavyweight European Champion +96,600 kg
- 2008 WKN Oriental Rules Super Heavyweight European Champion +96,600 kg
- 2008, 2007, 2006 Swiss Champion
- 2005 WFC B Klasse Swiss Champion

== Kickboxing record ==
Kickboxing record
32 Wins, 7 Losses, 1 Draw, 1 NC
Date	Result	Opponent	Event	Location	Method	Round	Time
2013-11-09	Win	(Greece) Nikos Tsoukalas	WFC Fight Night	Switzerland	TKO (Throwing in the towel)	3	
2013-10-12	Win	(Suriname) George Colin	Fight Night Volketswil	Volketswil, Switzerland	Decision (Split)	3	3:00
2012-09-08	NC	(Bosnia and Herzegovina) Senad Hadžić	5.Merseburger Fight Night, Semi Finals	Merseburg, Germany	DQ (Both fighters disqualified)	1	
2012-09-08	Win	(Netherlands) Utley Meriana	5.Merseburger Fight Night, Quarter Finals	Merseburg, Germany	Decision (Unanimous)	3	3:00
2012-05-05	Win	(Turkey) Murat Gezerci	Eggesin K–1 Fight Cup	Eggesin, Germany	KO	2	
2012-04-21	Loss	(Germany) Nicolaj Falin	Ready 4 War 2	Zürich, Switzerland	Decision	3	
2011-11-17	Loss	(Romania) Corneliu Rus	SuperKombat: Fight Club	Oradea, Romania	TKO (Referee Stoppage)	2	
2011-09-24	Loss	(Italy) Luca Panto	Best of Leone III	Saint Gallen, Switzerland	Decision	5	3:00
2011-09-03	Win	(Germany) Vladimir Toktasynov	Prestige Fight Club	Baden, Switzerland	KO	1	
2011-06-04	Win	(Bosnia and Herzegovina) Senad Hadžić	Winterthurer Fight Night	Winterthur, Switzerland	KO (Knee)	1	
Wins WFC World Championship +95 kg.
2011-05-28	Win	(Turkey) Gökhan Gülücü	Ergen Ring Ateşi	Istanbul, Turkey	Decision		3:00
2011-04-02	Win	(Germany) Simon Fiess	Fightnight Volketswil	Zürich, Switzerland	Decision	5	3:00
Wins WFC World Championship +95 kg.
2011-03-26	Win	(Turkey) Hamza Kendircioglu	Ergen Ring Ateşi	Istanbul, Turkey	KO	2	
2010-08-14	Win	(Turkey) Erhan Deniz	Ergen Ring Ateşi -13	Van, Turkey	Decision	5	
Wins WKN Oriental Rules Super Heavyweight World Championship +96,600 kg.
2010-06-26	Win	(Spain) Frank Muñoz	Best of Leone II	Bern, Switzerland	Decision		3:00
2010-03-19	Loss	(Belarus) Igor Bugaenko	K-1 World Max 2010 - East European Tournament	Minsk, Belarus	Decision (Unanimous)	3	
2009-12-26	Win	(Turkey) Hamza Kendircioglu	Ergen Ring Ateşi -11	Erzurum, Turkey	KO	1	
Wins WKN Oriental Rules Super Heavyweight European Championship +96,600 kg.
2009-10-31	Loss	(Turkey) Hamza Kendircioglu	Ergen Ring Ateşi	Istanbul, Turkey	Decision (unanimous)	5	3:00
Lost WKN OR European Championship +96,600 kg.
2009-02-21	Win	(Germany) Goran Vidakovic	Fightnight of the Stars 2	Bad Ragaz, Switzerland	Decision	3	
2008-12-26	Win	(Turkey) Erhan Deniz	Ergen Ring Ateşi	Istanbul, Turkey	KO	3	
Wins WKN Oriental Rules Super Heavyweight European Championship +96,600 kg.
2008-09-08	Win	(Switzerland) Patrick Schmied	Fightnight of the Stars	Bad Ragaz, Switzerland	KO	2	
2008-05-31	Win	(Morocco) Yussuf Belmikdan	Best of Leone	Saint Gallen, Switzerland	KO	4	
2007-12-24	Loss	(Suriname) Ginty Vrede	Return of the King 2	Paramaribo, Suriname	KO	2	
2007-02-24	Win	(Germany) Oliver Van Damme	Fightnight Vaduz	Vaduz, Liechtenstein	KO	3	
2006-12-22	Loss	(Czech Republic) Tomáš Hron	WKN Kickboxing in Prague	Prague, Czech Republic	TKO	1	
For WKN Kickboxing Intercontinental Oriental Rules Championship.
Legend: Win Loss Draw/No contest Notes

== See also ==
- List of male kickboxers
