= Horace Martin =

Jamaican-Dutch kickboxer (born 1985)

- Born: May 7, 1985
- Other names: Boy Boy
- Nationality: Dutch; Jamaican
- Height: 1.85 m (6 ft 1 in)
- Weight: 96 kg (212 lb; 15 st 2 lb)
- Division: Light Heavyweight; Cruiserweight
- Style: Kickboxing
- Fighting out of: Arnhem, Netherlands

Kickboxing record
- Total: 49
- Wins: 42
- By knockout: 20
- Losses: 6
- Draws: 1
- Last updated on: June 13, 2015

Horace Martin (born 7 May 1985) is a Jamaican-Dutch kickboxer. He is two times W.A.K.O. Pro and W.F.C.A. world champion.

== Titles ==
- 2014 W.F.C.A. Thaiboxing World Champion -95 kg
- 2012 Troyes Trophy Tournament Champion -91 kg
- 2013 W.A.K.O. Pro K-1 Rules Cruiser Light Heavyweight World Champion -85.1 kg (1 Title Def.)
- 2010 Fight Night Merseburg K-1 Rules Tournament Champion

== Kickboxing record ==
Professional kickboxing record
Date	Result	Opponent	Event	Location	Method	Round	Time
2017-10-29	Win	(Netherlands) Fred Sikking	WFL: Manhoef vs. Bonjasky, Final 16	Almere, Netherlands	Decision Overturned	3	3:00
2015-06-13	Loss	(Romania) Bogdan Stoica	SUPERKOMBAT Special Edition	Spreitenbach, Switzerland	TKO (referee stoppage)	2	2:44
SUPERKOMBAT Cruiserweight Championship eliminator.
2015-04-19	Win	(Netherlands) Fred Sikking	The Best of all Elements	Almere, Netherlands	Decision	3	3:00
2014-04-21	Win	(Armenia) Jegish Yegoian	Born 2 Fight	Elst, Netherlands	KO	2	
Wins W.F.C.A. Thaiboxing World Championship -95 kg.
2013-03-09	Win	(France) Yassine Ahaggan	Monte Carlo Fighting Masters	Monte Carlo, Monaco	KO	2	
Defended W.A.K.O. Pro K-1 Rules Cruiser Light Heavyweight World Title -85.1 kg.
2012-12-01	Win	(Netherlands) Hicham El Gaoui	Fighters Heart	Arnhem, Netherlands	TKO (Doc. Stop.)		
2012-02-18	Win	(France) Emmanuel Payet	K-1 Event 3, Final	Troyes, France	TKO	3	
Wins Troyes Trophy Tournament Title -91 kg.
2012-02-18	Win	(France) Aristote Quitusisa	K-1 Event 3, Semi Finals	Troyes, France	Decision	3	3:00
2011-05-14	Win	(Estonia) Andrei Manzolo	Fight Night	Tallinn, Estonia	KO (Kneeto the Head)	1	
Wins W.A.K.O. Pro K-1 Rules Cruiser Light Heavyweight World Title -85.1 kg.
2011-04-25	Win	(Morocco) Samir al Mansouri	Born 2 Fight VI	Westervoort, Netherlands	TKO (Doctor Stop.)	2	
2011-02-26	Win	(Turkey) Ali Cenik	Kickbox Gala Golden Glory Helmond	Eindhoven, Netherlands	Decision	3	3:00
2010-08-29	Win	(Germany) Jan Reimann	3. Fight Night Merseburg, Semi Finals	Merseburg, Germany	TKO	1	3:00
Wins Fight Night Merseburg K-1 Rules Tournament Title. Had a walktrought in the final over Sascha Poppendieck.
2010-08-29	Win	(Bulgaria) Dimitar Iliev	3. Fight Night Merseburg, Quarter Finals	Merseburg, Germany	Ext. R. Decision	4	3:00
2010-04-05	Loss	(Turkey) Hakan Aksoy	Born 2 Fight	Westervoort, Netherlands	Decision	5	3:00
For The Dutch -86 kg Championship.
2010-03-19	Loss	(Belarus) Dzianis Hancharonak	K-1 World Max 2010	Minsk, Belarus	KO	1	1:20
2009-10-17	Loss	(Finland) Ville Aalto	Fight Festival 26	Helsinki, Finland	TKO (Cut)	2	
2009-08-01	Win	(Turkey) Selim Öztürk	Ergen Ring Ateşi 7	Turkey			
Legend: Win Loss Draw/No contest Notes

== See also ==
- List of male kickboxers
- List of male mixed martial artists
- List of It's Showtime events
