= Frank Muñoz =

Spanish kickboxer

- Born: Francisco Muñoz; August 14, 1983 (age 43); Barcelona, Spain
- Other names: The Professor, Crazy Frank, La Pantera de Menorca
- Nationality: Spanish
- Height: 1.95 m (6 ft 5 in)
- Weight: 98–84 kg (216–185 lb; 15 st 6 lb – 13 st 3 lb)
- Division: Heavyweight light heavyweight - Middleweight
- Style: Kickboxing
- Fighting out of: Amsterdam, Netherlands
- Team: Moya Barcelona (2005- 2008); Chakuriki Gym (2010-2013); Vos Gym (2008-2010) Mousid gym 2013-2016 KOPS GYM Amsterdam 2016- 2017, AKA Gym California (2016-present)
- Trainer: Bob "Crazy Bob"CookJavier Mendez Mousid Akhamrane Thom Harinck; Xavi Moya; Ivan Hippolyte
- Years active: 2005 - present

Kickboxing record
- Total: 83
- Wins: 61
- By knockout: 31
- Losses: 21
- Draws: 1

Other information
- Website: www.frankmunoz.net

Frank Muñoz (born 14 August 1983) is a Spanish heavyweight kickboxer, who has competed in the SUPERKOMBAT Fighting Championship, where he is a former 2013 SUPERKOMBAT World Grand Prix Tournament Champion. He is also the former WAKO-Pro K-1 European champion.

== Biography and career ==
Frank Muñoz was adopted by Menorcan family and spent his first days on the island. He started kickboxing in Barcelona in 2005 at Esportrogent gym with former fullcontact champion Xavi Moya. He had been inspired after watching Remy Bonjasky fight on television. In 2008 he moved to Amsterdam and joined Vos Gym. He was trained by Ivan Hippolyte and had famous sparring partners like Mirko Filipović, Remy Bonjasky. After that he joined Chakuriki Gym in 2010, trained by Thom Harinck alongside Le Banner, Braddock Silva, Peter Aerts and Hesdy Gerges he faced some top fighters.

He was Spanish Muay thai professional champion, in 2010 he fought Brice Guidon for his WPMF European Heavyweight Muaythai title and lost the fight by split decision. In the same year he became Amsterdam fight club heavyweight tournament champion defeating Slovenian Jasmin Bečirović and Thiago Martina in the final. Later that year he had his debut for the world top promotion It's Showtime and lost to Rico Verhoeven by decision.

In 2011 he participated Enfusion: Quest for honor tournament. It was a TV Show featuring 15 fighters that live, train and fight together. During the show he defeated Sahak Parparyan and Redouan Cairo in SUPERKOMBAT, some of the best -95 kg fighters and went to the final tournament in Prague where he defeated Wendell Roche and loss to domestic Ondřej Hutník in the finals.

In 2012 he fought in a tournament for WKN kickboxing GP and lost in the finals to one of the best French kickboxers Stéphane Susperregui after extra round. Then he fought Steve McKinnon for WBC Muaythai Super Cruiserweight World title and surprisingly lost the fight in the first round by overhand right knockout after only 16 seconds.

On October 20, 2012, he became WAKO-Pro K-1 European champion defeating Toni Čatipović from Croatia after five rounds. In the second round Čatipović caught him with few elbows but without any cut that would hinder Muñoz to take victory. Later Čatipović was few times at the edge of knockout but managed to Finnish the fight, that clearly belonged to Muñoz.

He was late replacement in a non-tournament bout at the K-1 World Grand Prix FINAL in Zagreb on March 15, 2013 and he lost to Mladen Brestovac via unanimous decision .

He competed in the tournament at SUPERKOMBAT World Grand Prix 10 in Craiova, Romania on May 18, 2013. After defeating Nikolaj Falin via unanimous decision in the semi-finals, he lost a controversial unanimous decision to Sebastian Ciobanu following an extension round in the final.

As much of the kickboxing community felt that Muñoz was very solid against Ciobanu, SUPERKOMBAT officials decided to award him with a wildcard spot in the SUPERKOMBAT Grand Prix 2013.

He defeated Damien Garcia by unanimous decision in a rather lackluster fight at the K-1 World MAX 2013 World Championship Tournament Final 16 in Majorca, Spain on September 14, 2013.

He faced Muamer Tufekčić on SUPERKOMBAT World Grand Prix 2013 Final Elimination in quarter finals. In second round Muñoz sent a low blow and referee counted to Tufekčić, at the end of the round Muamer was also deducted a point for clinching. In third round Muamer scored a knockdown but could not Finnish the fight and Muñoz won by judges split decision.

He won the SUPERKOMAT World Grand Prix 2013 Final in Galați, Romania on December 21, 2013, beating D'Angelo Marshall by unanimous decision in the semi-finals before taking an extension round unanimous decision over Redouan Cairo in the final. Graduated in International Sports Management & Business from the Hogeschool van Amsterdam class 2018.

Trained as a professional fighter by Dutch kickboxing pioneers Ivan Hyppolite, Mousid Akhamrane, and Thom Harinck, Frank combined their teachings to develop his own distinctive kickboxing training style.

During his university internship in Chicago, he was hired as a professional sparring partner and standout strategy coach by Ultimate Fighting Championship champion Daniel Cormier. Frank helped Cormier in various fighting camps, eventually becoming the UFC light heavyweight championship in Boston. After training at the American Kickboxing Academy under head coach Javier Mendez, Frank's passion and willpower allow him to study the program in other prestigious American gyms such as Couture MMA (Las Vegas). Kings MMA (Huntington Beach) under master Rafael Cordeiro.

After the success in America, working with elite fighters and giving a Dutch kickboxing seminar tour, Frank was part of the Dutch Bellator Champion Gegard Mousasi team. (Leiden) The Netherlands.

The Swedish UFC greatest fighter of all time, Alexander Gustafsson, also hired Frank Munoz as a sparring partner and standout coach specialist at All Stars Gym Stockholm. One of the best mixed martial arts gymnastics in the UK London Shoot Fighters ask Frank Munoz training services for different fighters like the star Michael Venom Page.

=== All this experience collected Frank and not only developed a training system with gyms across the world, Frank debuted in MMA with a technical knockout victory in Austria in 2019. ===
Frank currently works for the sports department of the city of Amsterdam as a Martial Artist instructor, and several spot schools in Amsterdam. Frank is an active MMA athlete. Frank Muñoz, from Menorca, fights for survival after suffering a stroke

The well-known kickboxer from Ciutadella recounts how he survived a stroke and how he "has returned to work without physical or cognitive limitations."

Frank Muñoz has opened his heart in a letter he wrote on Facebook to explain the ordeal he has gone through in recent months and how he has managed to recover and return to normal. The well-known kickboxer from Ciutadella, who returned to Menorca a few years ago after living in Amsterdam, recounts that he suffered a stroke that required him to be transferred and undergo emergency surgery in Mallorca.

"Last November 21st, while dropping my daughter off at school, I suffered a stroke (ischemic stroke). Right after saying goodbye to her, I started to feel the right side of my body failing," he explains.

"The quick action of the incredible team at @consolaciociutadella was key. They happened to be conducting a first aid training course." They laid me on the floor and activated the emergency medical protocol."

Frank Muñoz describes how "I prepared myself to die. I felt no pain or fear. Only anger and a deep sadness when I thought of my 3-year-old daughter, my wife, and my parents." He was transferred to the Mateu Orfila Hospital in Maó and from there to Son Espases Hospital by helicopter for emergency surgery: "They operated to unblock a clot that was preventing oxygen from reaching my brain. The operation went well."

"When I woke up in the ICU, I couldn't speak or move the right side of my body. The neurologist told me I would need more than a year of rehabilitation, although without any lasting effects. I was devastated. I depended on help for everything. The life I knew had vanished."

Nevertheless, Muñoz explains, he began his recovery "as if it were a battle." And today, just seven weeks later, I'm back to my normal life and have returned to work without any physical or cognitive limitations. "Thank you to everyone in Ciutadella for respecting my privacy during these almost two months. Life is fragile. And also a gift," concludes Frank Muñoz, who has won his battle against death

== Honours and awards ==
On January 24 after winning SUPERKOMAT World Grand Prix 2013 Final he was awarded with Silver Flabiol and won the "Ciutadellencs de s’Any 2013" award, becoming Sportsman of the year and the Honorary citizen of hometown Ciutadella de Menorca. On April 17, 2014, Frank Muñoz was awarded in Menorca at the I Gala de l'es port menorqui with the Gold distinction as outstanding athlete 2013.

- Spain: Honorary citizen of Ciutadella de Menorca (2013)
- Spain: Sportsman of the year Ciutadella de Menorca (2013)
- Spain: Gold distinction as outstanding athlete (2013)
- Spain: Honorary member of Penya Barcelonista Ciutadella (2014)

== Titles ==
=== Professional ===
- 2013 SUPERKOMBAT World Grand Prix 2013 tournament champion
- 2013 SUPERKOMBAT World Grand Prix II tournament runner up
- 2012 WAKO-Pro K-1 European champion -94.2 kg
- 2012 WKN kickboxing GP runner up
- 2011 Enfusion Quest for honor tournament runner up -95 kg
- 2010 Amsterdam fight club heavyweight tournament champion
- 2009 K-1 Spain Battles 2009 tournament runner up
- Spanish muaythai pro champion

=== Amateur ===
- 2010 Spanish Olympic boxing championships (gold)
- 2008 Spanish Olympic boxing championships (gold)
- 2008 W.A.K.O. European Championships in Oporto, Portugal (bronze) −91 kg (K-1 rules)

== Kickboxing record (incomplete) ==
Professional Kickboxing Record
61 Wins (31 (T)KO's, 30 Decisions), 21 Losses, 1 Draw
Date	Result	Opponent	Event	Location	Method	Round	Time
2016-09-10	Loss	(Croatia) Antonio Plazibat	W5 European League XXXVI	Zvolen, Slovakia	Decision (Unanimous)	3	3:00
2016-05-19	Loss	(France) Fabrice Aurieng	Capital Fights	Paris, France	Decision	3	3:00
2015-11-27	Loss	(Croatia) Mladen Kujundžić	FFC21: Rijeka	Rijeka, Croatia	KO (Right High Kick)	2	2:43
FFC Light Heavyweight Title Eliminator.
2015-08-04	Win	(France) Zinedine Hameur-Lain	Fight Night Saint-Tropez	Saint Tropez, France	Decision (Unanimous)	4	2:00
2015-03-13	Loss	(Bosnia and Herzegovina) Dževad Poturak	FFC 7: Sarajevo	Sarajevo, Bosnia and Herzegovina	Decision (Unanimous)	3	3:00
2015-02-07	Loss	(Spain) César Córdoba	International Fighting Championship 2	Barcelona, Spain	Decision (Unanimous)	3	3:00
2014-12-07	Win	(Kazakhstan) Nikolay Gusniev	Tatneft Cup 2015 1st selection 1/8 final	Kazan, Russia	RTD	3	3:00
2013-12-21	Win	(Suriname) Redouan Cairo	SUPERKOMBAT World Grand Prix 2013 Final, Final	Galați, Romania	Ext R. Decision (Unanimous)	4	3:00
Wins 2013 SUPERKOMBAT World Grand Prix tournament title.
2013-12-21	Win	(Curaçao) D'Angelo Marshall	SUPERKOMBAT World Grand Prix 2013 Final, Semi Finals	Galați, Romania	Decision (Unanimous)	3	3:00
2013-11-09	Win	(Bosnia and Herzegovina) Muamer Tufekčić	SUPERKOMBAT World Grand Prix 2013 Final Elimination, Quarter Finals	Ploiești, Romania	Decision (Split)	3	3:00
Muñoz was awarded wildcard for the event after an appeal.
2013-09-14	Win	(Spain) Damian Garcia	K-1 World MAX 2013 World Championship Tournament Final 16	Majorca, Spain	Decision (Unanimous)	3	3:00
Qualifies for K-1 World Grand Prix 2013.
2013-05-18	Loss	(Romania) Sebastian Ciobanu	SUPERKOMBAT World Grand Prix II 2013, Final	Craiova, Romania	Ext. R Decision (Unanimous)	4	3:00
Fight was for SUPERKOMBAT World Grand Prix II tournament title.
2013-05-18	Win	(Germany) Nikolaj Falin	SUPERKOMBAT World Grand Prix II 2013, Semi Finals	Craiova, Romania	Decision (Unanimous)	3	3:00
2013-03-15	Loss	(Croatia) Mladen Brestovac	K-1 World Grand Prix FINAL in Zagreb, Super Fight	Zagreb, Croatia	Decision (Unanimous)	3	3:00
2012-12-02	Draw	(United States) Alex Roberts	REBELS, Legends 3	Kumamoto, Japan	Draw	3	3:00
2012-10-20	Win	(Croatia) Toni Čatipović	Grand Casino Origen	Madrid, Spain	Decision	5	3:00
Wins vacant WAKO Pro Muay Thai rules cruiser heavyweight European title -94.2 kg.
2012-06-09	Loss	(Australia) Steve McKinnon	Singha Battle For The Belts	Bangkok, Thailand	KO (Punch)	1	0:16
For McKinnon's WBC Muaythai Super Cruiserweight World title.
2012-04-28	Loss	(France) Stéphane Susperregui	Le Banner Series Acte 1, Final	Geneva, Switzerland	Ext.R.Decision	4	2:00
For WKN kickboxing GP -100 kg title.
2012-04-28	Win	(Turkey) Yuksel Ayaydin	Le Banner Series Acte 1, Semi Finals	Geneva, Switzerland	Decision	3	2:00
2012-02-25	Loss	(Montenegro) Goran Radonjić	SUPERKOMBAT World Grand Prix I 2012	Podgorica, Montenegro	Decision (Unanimous)	3	3:00
2011-12-30	Loss	(Czech Republic) Ondřej Hutník	Enfusion Kickboxing Tournament '11, Final	Prague, Czech Republic	Decision (Unanimous)	3	3:00
For Enfusion kickboxing tournament championship.
2011-12-30	Win	(Curaçao) Wendell Roche	Enfusion Kickboxing Tournament '11, Semi Finals	Prague, Czech Republic	Decision (Unanimous)	3	3:00
2011-10-01	Win	(Suriname) Redouan Cairo	SUPERKOMBAT World Grand Prix III 2011	Brăila, Romania	Decision	3	3:00
2011-06-11	Loss	(France) Nicolas Wamba	8ème Nuit des Sports de Combat	Geneva, Switzerland	Decision	5	2:00
2011-02-?	Win	(Belgium) Marc Vlieger	Enfusion Kickboxing Tournament '11, 2nd Round	Koh Samui, Thailand	Decision (Unanimous)	3	3:00
Qualifies for Enfusion Kickboxing 2011 Final 4.
2011-01-?	Win	(Armenia) Sahak Parparyan	Enfusion Kickboxing Tournament '11, 1st Round	Koh Samui, Thailand	Decision	3	3:00
Drops down from heavyweight to 95KG.
2010-12-18	Loss	(Netherlands) Rico Verhoeven	Fightclub presents: It's Showtime 2010	Amsterdam, Netherlands	Decision	3	3:00
2010-11-27	Loss	(Australia) Nathan Corbett	Evolution 22	Gold Coast, Australia	TKO (Referee stoppage)	3	N/A
2010-09-24	Win	(Netherlands) Thiago Martina	Amsterdam fight club, Final	Amsterdam, Netherlands	Decision (Unanimous)	3	3:00
Amsterdam fight club heavyweight tournament champion.
2010-09-24	Win	(Slovenia) Jasmin Bečirović	Amsterdam fight club, Semi Finals	Amsterdam, Netherlands	Decision	3	3:00
2010-07-23	Loss	(France) Brice Guidon	Muay Thai France vs Thailand	Stade de l'Est, Réunion	Decision (Split)	5	3:00
For Guidon's WPMF European Heavyweight Muaythai title (+91 kg).
2010-06-26	Loss	(Switzerland) Slavo Polugić	Best of Leone II	Bern, Switzerland	Decision	N/A	3:00
2010-02-27	Loss	(Curaçao) Benjey Zimmerman	Amsterdam Fightclub: Rotterdam vs Amsterdam, Semi Finals	Amsterdam, Netherlands	Decision	3	3:00
2009-11-?	Win	(Canary Islands) Cristiano Delgado	Gladiadores del Siglo XXI	Málaga, Spain	TKO (Doctor stoppage)	3	N/A
2009-10-04	Loss	(Netherlands) Michael Duut	Ring Rage III	Groningen, Netherlands	Decision	3	3:00
2009-06-06	Loss	(Spain) Damian Garcia	K-1 Spain Battles 2009 Tournament (Heavyweight), Final	Barcelona, Spain	DQ	1	N/A
For K-1 Spain Battles 2009 Heavyweight Tournament Title.
2009-06-06	Win	(Lithuania) Algirdas Valenta	K-1 Spain Battles 2009 Tournament (Heavyweight), Semi Finals	Barcelona, Spain	TKO (Strikes)	N/A	N/A
2009-05-09	Loss	(Netherlands) Ismael Londt	SLAMM Catalonia vs Netherlands	Barcelona, Spain	Decision	3	3:00
2009-04-05	Win	(Spain) Raul Salas	WKN Spain	Barcelona, Spain	Decision	4	2:00
2009-03-14	Win	(Spain) Erik Susunaga		Pamplona, Spain	RTD	3	3:00
2009-02-06	Loss	(France) Fabrice Aurieng	K-1 Kick Tournament in Marseille, Semi Finals	Marseille, France	Decision	3	3:00
2008-12-12	Win	(Spain) Ismael Fernández	Campeonato Del Mundo DE Full Contact	Barcelona, Spain	N/A	N/A	N/A
2008-07-25	Win	(Turkey) Hamza Kendircioglu	The new generation of kickboxing, Team Europe vs Team Turkey	Istanbul, Turkey	NA	3	N/A
Legend: Win Loss Draw/No contest Notes

Amateur Kickboxing Record
Date	Result	Opponent	Event	Location	Method	Round	Time
2009-10-24	Loss	(Belarus) Alexey Kudin	W.A.K.O World Championships 2009, Low-Kick 1/4 Finals +91 kg	Villach, Austria	N/A	N/A	N/A
2009-10-24	Win	(Croatia) Ivan Bijelić	W.A.K.O World Championships 2009, Low-Kick First Round +91 kg	Villach, Austria	N/A	N/A	N/A
2008-11	Loss	(Russia) Vladimir Mineev	W.A.K.O European Championships 2008, K-1 Semi Finals -91 kg	Porto, Portugal	Decision (Unanimous)	3	2:00
Wins W.A.K.O. European Championship '08 K-1 Bronze Medal -91 kg.
2008-11	Win	(Portugal) Alberto Morais	W.A.K.O European Championships 2008, K-1 Quarter Finals -91 kg	Porto, Portugal	Decision (Split)	3	2:00
Legend: Win Loss Draw/No contest Notes

== See also ==
- List of WAKO Amateur European Championships
- List of K-1 champions
- List of K-1 events
- List of male kickboxers
