= Ashwin Balrak =

Dutch-Surinamese professional kickboxer and lawyer

- Born: 17 May 1975 (age 51); Suriname
- Other names: Bad Boy
- Height: 1.87 m (6 ft 2 in)
- Weight: 100 kg (220 lb; 15 st 10 lb)
- Division: Heavyweight
- Style: Kickboxing
- Stance: Orthodox
- Fighting out of: Rotterdam, Netherlands
- Team: Balrak Sport Consultancy (2015); Team Perfect; Gym International (2002); Sitan Gym; Team Hardcore; Burning Heart Dojo
- Trainer: Ernesto Hoost; Rodney Glunder (1998–2015)
- Years active: 1995–2010, 2015–present

Kickboxing record
- Total: 87
- Wins: 71
- By knockout: 25
- Losses: 15
- By knockout: 3
- No contests: 1
- Last updated on: 10 November 2010

Ashwin Balrak (born 17 May 1975) is a Surinamese-Dutch professional kickboxer and lawyer.

== Career and recent arrest ==
Balrak was a former WPKL European Kickboxing champion who also competed in K-1. He made his K-1 debut in 2007 at K-1 Fighting Network Romania 2007 against Patrice Quarteron.

A criminal lawyer by profession, Balrak was arrested on 26 November 2010 in Rotterdam along with five other Surinamese nationals for drug trafficking, carrying 82 kg of cocaine and allegedly trafficking drugs for a distribution network.

== Titles ==
- Enfusion
  - 2014 Enfusion Reality Season 5 Tournament Champion
- TatNeft Arena
  - 2010 Tatneft Arena World Cup 2010 (+80 kg) runner-up
  - 2009 Tatneft Arena European Cup 2009 (+80 kg) champion
- K-1
  - 2008 K-1 Prague tournament champion
  - 2007 K-1 Fighting Network Scandinavian Qualification runner up
- Fights at the Border
  - 2005 Fights at the Border IV finalist
- King of the Ring
  - 2005 King of the Ring world champion (-105 kg)
- World Pro Kickboxing League
  - 2002 WPKL European Muaythai champion (-76 kg)
  - 2000 WPKL European Muaythai champion (-79.3 kg)

== Kickboxing record ==
Kickboxing record
71 wins (25 (T) KOs, 46 decisions), 15 losses
Date	Result	Opponent	Event	Location	Method	Round	Time
2016-03-05	Loss	(Suriname) Redouan Cairo	The Battle	Netherlands	KO	1	
2015-02-01	Loss	(Belarus) Andrei Gerasimchuk	Kunlun Fight 18: The Return of the King - Super Heavyweight Tournament, Final 16	Guangzhou, China	Decision (unanimous)	3	3:00
2014-09-23	Win	(Poland) Lukasz Krupadziorow	Enfusion 5: Victory of the Vixen, Final	Koh Samui, Thailand	TKO (low kicks)		
Wins the Enfusion Reality Season 5 Tournament.
2014-09-23	Win	(France) Brice Guidon	Enfusion 5: Victory of the Vixen, Semi Finals	Koh Samui, Thailand	Decision	3	3:00
2010-10-22	Loss	(Belarus) Vitali Akhramenko	Tatneft Arena World Cup 2010 final (+80 kg)	Kazan, Russia	Decision (unanimous)	5	3:00
Fight was for Tatneft Arena World Cup 2010 (+80 kg) title.
2010-05-29	Win	(Romania) Daniel Ghiţă	It's Showtime 2010 Amsterdam	Amsterdam, Netherlands	Decision (5–0)	3	3:00
2010-02-27	Loss	(Netherlands) Hesdy Gerges	Amsterdam Fightclub presents: Amsterdam vs Rotterdam	Amsterdam, Netherlands	Decision (unanimous)	3	3:00
2009-10-23	Win	(Russia) Semen Shelepov	Tatneft Arena European Cup 2009 final (+80 kg)	Kazan, Russia	TKO (corner stoppage)	3	3:00
Wins Tatneft European Cup 2009 (+80kg) title.
2009-10-16	Loss	(Czech Republic) Tomáš Hron	Return of the Gladiators	Amsterdam, Netherlands	Decision (unanimous)	3	3:00
Fight was for King of the Ring (+95kg) World title.
2009-09-16	Win	(Russia) Vladimir Mineev	Tatneft Arena European Cup 2009 1/2 final (+80 kg)	Kazan, Russia	Decision (unanimous)	4	3:00
2009-05-26	Win	(Russia) Igor Sen	Tatneft Arena European Cup 2009 1/4 final (+80 kg)	Kazan, Russia	KO (left overhand)	2	1:02
2009-05-16	Win	(Switzerland) Bjorn Bregy	It's Showtime 2009 Amsterdam	Amsterdam, Netherlands	Ext. R decision (unanimous)	4	3:00
2009-02-19	Win	(Russia) Andrei Kirsanov	Tatneft Arena European Cup 2009 1/8 final (+80 kg)	Kazan, Russia	TKO (corner stoppage)	2	3:00
2008-12-20	Win	(Russia) Shamil Abasov	K-1 Fighting Network Prague 2008	Prague, Czech Republic	KO (left body shot/right knee)	2	1:34
Wins K-1 Fighting Network Prague 2008 tournament title.
2008-12-20	Win	(Romania) Raul Cătinaș	K-1 Fighting Network Prague 2008	Prague, Czech Republic	Decision (unanimous)	3	3:00
2008-12-20	Win	(Bosnia and Herzegovina) Dzevad Poturak	K-1 Fighting Network Prague 2008	Prague, Czech Republic	TKO (injury)	3	
2008-10-18	Win	(Latvia) Konstantin Gluhov	Latvijā – "Milžu cīņas",	Liepāja, Latvia	Ext. R decision	4	3:00
2008-06-20	Loss	(Australia) Steve McKinnon	International Muay Thai Fight Night	Montego Bay, Jamaica	Decision (unanimous)	5	3:00
Fight was for WBC Muay Thai Super Cruiserweight World title.
2007-12-24	Win	(Czech Republic) Tomáš Hron	Return of The King 2	Paramaribo, Suriname	Decision (unanimous)	3	3:00
2007-10-14	Win	(Angola) Henriques Zowa	The Battle of Arnhem 6	Arnhem, Netherlands	Decision (unanimous)	3	3:00
2007-05-20	Loss	(Australia) Nathan Corbett	K-1 Scandinavia GP 2007	Stockholm, Sweden	Decision (unanimous)	3	3:00
Fight was for K-1 Scandinavia GP 2007 tournament title.
2007-05-20	Win	(Sweden) Rickard Nordstrand	K-1 Scandinavia GP 2007	Stockholm, Sweden	Decision (unanimous)	3	3:00
2007-05-20	Win	(Spain) Damian Garcia	K-1 Scandinavia GP 2007	Stockholm, Sweden	TKO (low kicks)	1	1:20
2007-05-04	Loss	(France) Patrice Quarteron	K-1 Fighting Network Romania 2007	Bucharest, Romania	Decision (unanimous)	3	3:00
2007-04-07	Win	(Morocco) Samir Benazzouz	Balans Fight Night	Tilburg, Netherlands	Decision	3	3:00
2006-11-12	Win	(Morocco) Samir Benazzouz	2H2H: Pride and Honor	Rotterdam, Netherlands	TKO (low kicks)	3	
2006-05-06	Win	(Turkey) Kenan Akbulut	Masters Fight Night 2006, quarter finals	Duisburg, Germany	Decision	3	3:00
2006-02-12	Win	(Netherlands) Ricardo van den Bos	Dancing With the Fighters	Amsterdam, Netherlands	Decision	5	3:00
2005-12-10	Loss	(Russia) Alexander Ustinov	Fights at the Border IV	Lommel, Belgium	Decision (unanimous)	3	3:00
Fight was for Fights at the Border IV tournament title.
2005-12-10	Win	(Poland) Marcin Rozalski	Fights at the Border IV	Lommel, Belgium	Decision (unanimous)	3	3:00
2005-12-10	Win	(Switzerland) Bjorn Bregy	Fights at the Border IV	Lommel, Belgium	Decision (unanimous)	3	3:00
2005-10-09	Win	(Netherlands) Jerrel Venetiaan	Bushido Europe "Rotterdam Rumble"	Rotterdam, Netherlands	Decision (split)	5	3:00
2005-06-05	Win	(Hungary) Attila Karacs	King of the Ring - Mission Impossible -	Zagreb, Croatia	Decision (split)	5	3:00
Wins King of the Ring World title (-105 kg).
2004-03-27	Loss	(Belarus) Dmitry Shakuta	WPKL Muay Thai Champions League XII	Rotterdam, Netherlands	Decision (unanimous)	5	3:00
Fight was for WPKL Muaythai World title (-76.2 kg).
2003-12-05	Win	(Russia) Magomed Magomedov	King's Birthday 2003, 83 kg tournament	Bangkok, Thailand	Decision (unanimous)	3	3:00
2003-12-05	Win	(Thailand) Saenkao Kiatyongyut	King's Birthday 2003, 83 kg tournament	Bangkok, Thailand	KO (punches)	1	1:16
2003-09-28	Win	(England) Christian di Paolo	WPKL Muay Thai Champions League XI,	Rotterdam, Netherlands	KO (knee to the body)	3	0:34
2003-04-28	Win	(Thailand) Wanlop Sitpholek	Tulp Promotions	Amsterdam, Netherlands	KO (left uppercut)	3	0:55
2003-03-22	Win	(Belgium) Kurt de Pauw	Muay Thai Champions League IX	Madrid, Spain	KO (knee)	1	0:45
2003-02-02	Win	(Turkey) Yücel Fidan	Killerdome II	Amsterdam, Netherlands	KO (flying knee)	1	0:12
2002-11-29	NC	(Suriname) Rayen Simson	WPKL Muay Thai Champions League VIII	Rotterdam, Netherlands	No contest (shoulder injury)	1	
Fight was for Simson's WPKL Muaythai World title (-76.2 kg).
2002-10-26	Win	(Czech Republic) Jiri Zak	WPKL Muay Thai Champions League VII	Madrid, Spain	Decision (unanimous)	5	3:00
Wins WPKL Muaythai European title (-76.2 kg).
2002-03-18	Loss	(Suriname) Rayen Simson	2Hot2Handle "Simply the Best" 4	Rotterdam, Netherlands	Decision (unanimous)	5	3:00
Fight was for WPKL Muaythai World title (-76.2 kg).
2001-10-21	Win	(Morocco) Nordin Ben-Sallah	It's Showtime - Original	Haarlem, Netherlands	TKO (corner stoppage)	4	3:00
2001-03-03	Win	(Thailand) Changpuek Kiatsongrit	WPKL Muay Thai Champions League IV	Rotterdam, Netherlands	TKO (doctor stoppage)	3	
2000-11-13	Win	(Netherlands) Dennis Strijbis	The Night of Explosion	Rotterdam, Netherlands	TKO (doctor stoppage)	1	3:00
2000-06-04	Win	(Netherlands) Perry Ubeda	The Night of Revenge	Haarlem, Netherlands	Decision (unanimous)	5	3:00
2000-01-23	Win	(Germany) Mark Richardt	Day of No Mercy	Rotterdam, Netherlands	TKO (doctor stoppage)	2	1:00
Wins WPKL Muaythai European title (-79.3 kg).
1999-12-11	Loss	(United States) Ron Belliveu		Sarajevo, Bosnia and Herzegovina	Decision	5	3:00
for the WPKL World Light Heavyweight (-79 kg/174.2 lb) Championship.
1999-03-27	Win	(Netherlands) Melvin Manhoef	The Fights of the Gladiators	Amsterdam, Netherlands	Decision (unanimous)	5	3:00
1998-05-31	Win	(Netherlands) Feisal Redding	Fights of the Decade	Amsterdam, Netherlands	Decision (unanimous)	5	3:00
1998-02-15	Loss	(Netherlands) Perry Ubeda	Chakuriki vs The Netherlands	Nijmegen, Netherlands	KO (roundhouse kick)	1	
1997-11-27	Win	(Netherlands) Rodney Glunder	Thaiboxing Event in Amsterdam	Amsterdam, Netherlands	Decision (unanimous)	5	3:00
Legend: Win Loss Draw/no contest Notes

== See also ==
- List of K-1 events
- List of K-1 champions
- List of male kickboxers
