= Fred Sikking =

Dutch Muay Thai kickboxer (born 1980)

- Born: Fred Sikking; February 20, 1980 (age 46); Hilversum, Netherlands
- Height: 1.88 m (6 ft 2 in)
- Weight: 95 kg (209 lb; 15.0 st)
- Division: Light Heavyweight; Cruiserweight; Heavyweight
- Style: Kickboxing, Muay Thai
- Team: Vos Gym

Kickboxing record
- Total: 82
- Wins: 49
- Losses: 32
- Draws: 1

Fred Sikking (born Hilversum, 20 February 1980) is a Dutch Muay Thai kickboxer who competes in the cruiserweight and heavyweight divisions. He fights for GLORY and SUPERKOMBAT. As of 12 March 2018, he was ranked the #5 light-heavyweight in the world by LiverKick.com.

== Bare-knuckle boxing ==
Sikking made his Bare Knuckle Fighting Championship debut against Ernesto Papa on 25 October 2025 at BKFC 83. He lost the fight by technical knockout in the first round.

== Kickboxing record (Incomplete) ==
Professional kickboxing record
48 Wins, 29 Losses, 1 Draw
Date	Result	Opponent	Event	Location	Method	Round	Time
2023-12-02	Loss	(Czech Republic) Tomáš Hron	Heroes Gate 23	Prague, Czech Republic	Decision	3	3:00
2020-9-26	Win	(Netherlands) Raymon Bonte	Enfusion ECE 03	Alkmaar, Netherlands	KO (Leg break)	1	
Wins the Enfusion ECE Light Heavyweight title.
2019-12-6	Loss	(Netherlands) Nidal Bchiri	Enfusion 92	Abu Dhabi, United Arab Emirates	Decision (Unanimous)	3	3:00
2019-10-26	Loss	(Netherlands) Muhammed Balli	CWS05	Neu-Ulm, Germany	Decision (Unanimous)	3	3:00
2019-10-5	Loss	(Netherlands) Thomas Bridgewater	Enfusion 88	Dordrecht, The Netherlands	Decision (Unanimous)	3	3:00
2018-09-22	Loss	(France) Nordine Mahieddine	WFL, Tournament Quarter-Finals	Almere, Netherlands	Decision	3	3:00
2019-06-19	Loss	(Germany) Danyo Ilunga	Steko´s Fight Club	Germany	KO (Right Hook)	2	1:24
2018-06-23	Loss	(Suriname) Clyde Brunswijk	Enfusion Talents 54	Netherlands	TKO	3	
2018-03-25	Win	(Netherlands) Ricardo van den Bos	WFL: Wildcard Tournament, Semi Finals	Almere, Netherlands	Decision	3	3:00
2017-10-29	Loss	(Jamaica) Boy Boy Martin	WFL: Manhoef vs. Bonjasky, Final 16	Almere, Netherlands	Decision Overturned	3	3:00
2017-09-30	Loss	(Netherlands) Brian Douwes	House of Pain	Alkmaar, Netherlands	Decision (unanimous)	3	3:00
2017-04-23	Win	(Netherlands) Michael Duut	WFL - Champion vs. Champion	Almere, Netherlands	KO	1	
2016-09-10	Loss	(Slovakia) Radovan Kulla	W5 Europe - Fortune Favours the Brave	Zvolen, Slovakia	Decision (unanimous)	3	3:00
2016-05-14	Win	(Belgium) Frédéric Sinistra	Enfusion	Nijmegen, Netherlands	TKO (Corner Stoppage)	2	0:00
2016-03-04	Loss	(Morocco) Ibrahim El Bouni	WFL	Hoofddorp, Netherlands	Decision	3	3:00
2016-01-23	Loss	(Netherlands) Bas Vorstenbosch	Sportmani Events VIII	Amsterdam, Netherlands	Decision	3	3:00
2015-12-04	Loss	(France) Zinedine Hameur-Lain	Glory 26: Amsterdam	Amsterdam, Netherlands	Decision (unanimous)	3	3:00
2015-10-18	Loss	(Cape Verde) Luis Tavares	WFL - Unfinished Business, Semi Finals	Hoofddorp, Netherlands	Decision	3	3:00
2015-08-01	Loss	(Romania) Andrei Stoica	SUPERKOMBAT World Grand Prix IV 2015	Mamaia, Romania	KO (left hook)	1	1:35
For the SUPERKOMBAT Super Cruiserweight Championship.
2015-04-19	Loss	(Jamaica) Boy Boy Martin	The Best of all Elements	Almere, Netherlands	Decision	3	3:00
2014-11-30	Loss	(Suriname) Redouan Cairo	Real Fighters: A Night 2 Remember	Hilversum, Netherlands	Decision (unanimous)	5	3:00
For the Real Fighter World Championship -95 kg.
2014-01-25	Loss	(Netherlands) Dennis Stolzenbach	Enfusion Live 13	Eindhoven, Netherlands	TKO (Doctor stiop.)	1	
2013-05-13	Win	(United States) Dewey Cooper	Muaythai Superfight	Pattaya, Thailand	Decision (unanimous)	5	3:00
Wins the WPMF World Heavyweight (-95.454 kg/210.4 lb) Championship.
2012-09-02	Win	(Turkey) Hakan Aksoy	Muay Thai Mania	The Hague, Netherlands	Decision	3	3:00
2011-11-19	Loss	(Spain) César Córdoba	King Of Warriors	Barcelona, Spain	KO	1	
For the WKL K-1 Rules World Championship.
2011-10-30	Win	(Netherlands) Rodney Glunder	Twilight's Fight Night	Hilversum, Netherlands	Decision (split)	3	3:00
2011-05-27	Loss	(Czech Republic) Jiri Zak	Grand Prix Chomutov	Chomutov, Czech Republic	Decision	5	3:00
For the WFCA K-1 Rules -86.2 World Championship.
2011-02-18	Loss	(Romania) Bogdan Stoica	Real Pain Challenge: Rising Force	Sofia, Bulgaria	KO (right hook)	1	
2010-08-29	Win	(Netherlands) Eddy Almeida	Fighting with the Stars	Paramaribo, Suriname	Decision	3	3:00
2008-12-21	Win	(Suriname) Leon Miedema	Suriname Regional	Suriname	TKO (Groin shot)	2	
2008-11-01	Win	(Netherlands) Donald Berner	Rings Holland	The Netherlands	Decision	3	3:00
2008-09-21	Loss	(Netherlands) Marcello Adriaansz	Slamm!!: Back To The Old School	The Netherlands	Decision	3	3:00
2008-05-10	Win	(Germany) Sammy Masa	Millfights Cup	Seevetal, Germany	KO	1	
2007-11-24	Win	(Netherlands) Rick Forkuo	Rings Holland	The Netherlands	KO	2	
2007-09-23	Draw	(Netherlands) Mitchell De Ligny	Rings Holland	The Netherlands	Deciscion Draw		
2007-09-01	Win	(Germany) Avni Dauti	Kumite Holland	The Netherlands			
2007	Win	(Thailand) Turbo		Patong, Thailand	TKO		
Legend: Win Loss Draw/No contest Notes

== Bare-knuckle record ==
Professional record breakdown
1 match	0 wins	1 loss
By knockout	0	1

Res.	Record	Opponent	Method	Event	Date	Round	Time	Location	Notes
Loss	0–1	Ernesto Papa	TKO	BKFC 83	October 25, 2025	1	0:53	Rome, Italy	

== See also ==
- List of male kickboxers
