= Tomáš Hron =

Czech kickboxer (born 1981)

- Born: Tomáš Hron; July 25, 1981 (age 45); Brno, Czechoslovakia
- Other names: Rattle Snake
- Nationality: Czech
- Height: 1.92 m (6 ft 3 1/2 in)
- Weight: 101 kg (223 lb; 15 st 13 lb)
- Division: Heavyweight
- Style: Muay Thai, kickboxing
- Team: Gladiator Promotion Team; Muay Thai Brno
- Trainer: Karel Kaiser

Kickboxing record
- Total: 117
- Wins: 90
- By knockout: 31
- Losses: 24
- Draws: 3

Other information
- Website: http://www.tomashron.cz/
- Last updated on: December 14, 2013

Tomáš Hron (born July 25, 1981) is a Czech kickboxer who has fought for the K-1, It's Showtime and SUPERKOMBAT promotions. Former Kings of The Ring, WKA and WKN champion and current Kings of The Ring heavyweight world champion.

== Career ==
He was scheduled to fight Eduardo Mendes on April 13, 2013, in the K-1 World Qualification - K-1 World MAX Elimination super fight but was pulled out because of K-1 financial problems.

He once again became "King of the Ring" K1 Rules Super Heavyweight World Champion beating Sebastian Ciobanu at Time of Gladiators event in Brno, Czech Republic on June 14, 2013. Ciobanu was counted two times in first round, it looked like it will be a KO, but Ciobanu recovered and used speed against bigger and stronger Hron. The two went to distance with Hron taking a unanimous decision victory (30:25, 30:25, 30:26).

He fought member of Glory roster, Jahfarr Wilnis at Final Fight Championship 8 in Zagreb, Croatia on October 25, 2013. Although he was late replacement for Pavel Zhuravlev and deducted two points for clinching, he won the fight by unanimous decision.

On 8 March 2014 he made Glory debut at Glory 14: Zagreb undercard. Originally scheduled to fight Dino Belošević, who withdrew from the fight so he finally rematched Kirk Krouba and once again winning by unanimous decision.

== Titles ==
- ONE Championship
  - 2021 Road to ONE Heavyweight Kickboxing Tournament Champion (-120 kg)
- World Association of Sporting Organizations
  - 2018 WASO World Champion Title -100 kg
- W5 Professional Kickboxing
  - 2016 W5 Intercontinental Super Heavyweight Champion
- Enfusion
- 2016 Enfusion Live Heavyweight Tournament runner up
- King of Kings
  - 2015 KOK WGP 2015 Heavyweight Tournament runner up
- King of the Ring
  - 2013 "King of the Ring" K-1 Rules Super Heavyweight World Champion (-105 kg)
  - 2009 "King of the Ring" K-1 Rules Super Heavyweight World Champion (-105 kg)
- World Muay Thai Association
  - 2009 Amsterdam Fight Club WMTA 4man Tournament Champion
- World Independent Promoters Union
  - 2008 W.I.P.U. "King of the Ring" K-1 Rules Heavyweight Super Champion (-105 kg)
- K-1
  - 2007 K-1 Italy Oktagon 2007 tournament champion
- World Kickboxing Network
  - 2006 WKN Kickboxing Intercontinental Oriental Rules Champion
  - 2003 WKN World Champion
  - 2001 WKN World Champion
- Kings of the Ring
  - 2004 Kings of the Ring: World GP 85 kg tournament champion
- World Kickboxing Association
  - 2004 WKA World Champion
  - 2002 MS WKA Champion
- Czech Muay-Thai Association
  - Czech Champion

== Fight record ==
Professional Muay Thai & kickboxing record
90 wins (30 (T)KOs), 24 losses, 3 draws
Date	Result	Opponent	Event	Location	Method	Round	Time
2024-09-21	Win	(Netherlands) Fred Sikking	Oktagon 61	Brno, Czech Republic	TKO (doctor stoppage)	1	3:00
2024-06-29	Loss	(Turkey) Kadir Yildirim	K-1 World GP 2024 in Sarajevo, Quarterfinals	Sarajevo, Bosnia and Herzegovina	Decision (unanimous)	3	3:00
2023-12-30	Win	(Morocco) Zouhair Benadi	Lucerna Boxing 15	Prague, Czech Republic	TKO (arm injury)	1	
Wins the interim WAKO PRO K-1 World +94.1kg title.
2023-12-02	Win	(Netherlands) Fred Sikking	Heroes Gate 23	Prague, Czech Republic	Decision	3	3:00
2023-07-29	Loss	(France) Mohamed Bensalem	Yangames Fight Night	Prague, Czech Republic	TKO (leg injury/low kick)	1	1:00
For the vacant WAKO PRO K-1 World +94.1kg title.
2022-12-09	Loss	(Netherlands) Errol Zimmerman	Mega Fight Arena	Istanbul, Turkey	TKO (leg injury/low kick)	1	1:01
2022-10-29	Win	(Slovakia) Ivan Bartek	Real Fight Arena 5	Brno, Czech Republic	Decision (unanimous)	3	3:00
2022-07-29	Loss	(Estonia) Uku Jürjendal	Yangames Fight Night ve Žlutých lázních	Prague, Czech Republic	Decision	3	3:00
2022-06-25	Loss	(Algeria) Sofian Laidouni	Le Défi du Nack Muay 7	Denain, France	Decision (majority)	5	3:00
Loses WAKO PRO K-1 World +94.1kg title.
2021-07-29	Win	(Canada) Olivier Langlois-Ross	Yangames Fight Night 9	Prague, Czech Republic	Decision	3	3:00
2021-04-24	Win	(Morocco) Mohamed Amine	Road to ONE: Night of Warriors 17	Prague, Czech Republic	Decision (unanimous)	3	3:00
Wins Road to ONE Heavyweight Kickboxing Tournament Final
2021-04-24	Win	(Turkey) Mehmet Özer	Road to ONE: Night of Warriors 17	Prague, Czech Republic	TKO (referee stoppage)	2	1:23
Road to ONE Heavyweight Kickboxing Tournament Semi-Final
2021-02-27	Loss	(Serbia) Strahinja Mitrić	OKTAGON UNDG: Last Man Standing	Brno, Czech Republic	Decision	3	3:00
2020-11-28	Win	(Poland) Michal Turynski	WAKO K1 World Grand Prix	Prague, Czech Republic	Decision (unanimous)	5	3:00
Retained WAKO Pro K1 Rules +94.10kg Title
2020-08-28	Win	(Italy) Claudio Istrate	Yangames Fight Night	Prague, Czech Republic	KO	2	
2019-09-28	Win	(Poland) Michal Blawdziewicz	WAKO K1 World Grand Prix	Czech Republic	TKO	3	
2019-07-25	Win	(France) Abderhamane Coulibaly	Yangames Fight Night	Prague, Czech Republic	KO	4	
Defends WAKO PRO K-1 European +94.1kg title.
2018-12-29	Win	(Moldova) Nicolae Globu	Noc mistru 13	Prague, Czech Republic	TKO	1	
Wins WASO -100 kg title
2018-10-06	Loss	(Ukraine) Roman Kryklia	FEA World Grand Prix, Semi Finals	Moldova	Decision (unanimous)	3	3:00
2018-07-26	Win	(Belarus) Petr Romankievich	Yangames Fight Night	Prague, Czech Republic	KO	4	
Wins WAKO PRO K-1 European +94.1kg title.
2018-04-20	Win	(Netherlands) Sergio Pique	Fusion FN	Brno, Czech Republic	Decision	5	3:00
Wins WFCA +95kg title.
2018-03-24	Win	(Serbia) Rade Opačić	Night of Warriors 2018	Liberec, Czech Republic	Decision	3	3:00
2017-09-29	Win	(Romania) Daniel Mocanu	Fusion FN 16: Cage Fight	Brno, Czech Republic	Decision	3	3:00
2017-07-27	Win	(Ukraine) Roman Kryklia	Yangames Fight Night 2017	Prague, Czech Republic	Decision	3	3:00
2017-05-20	Loss	(Egypt) Hesdy Gerges	Glory 41: Holland	Den Bosch, Netherlands	Decision (unanimous)	3	3:00
2016-10-08	Win	(Romania) Andrei Stoica	W5 Grand Prix "Legends in Prague"	Prague, Czech Republic	Decision (unanimous)	3	3:00
Wins vacant W5 Intercontinental Super Heavyweight Championship.
2016-07-28	Win	(Russia) Kirill Kornilov	Yangame's Fight Night 2016	Czech Republic	DQ	3	
2016-06-03	Win	(Morocco) Hicham Achalhi	FUSION FN6: RINGFIGHT	Brno, Czech Republic	Decision	3	3:00
2016-04-23	Loss	(Slovakia) Martin Pacas	Enfusion Live 39, Finals	Žilina, Slovakia	Decision	4	
For the Enfusion Live Heavyweight Tournament Championship.
2016-04-23	Win	(France) Gaetan Sautron	Enfusion Live 39, Semi Finals	Žilina, Slovakia	TKO	3	
2015-12-05	Win	(United States) Mighty Mo	GIBU Fight Night 2	Prague, Czech Republic	KO	2	
2015-11-14	Loss	(Lithuania) Julius Mocka	KOK World GP 2015 In Vilnius - Heavyweight Tournament Final	Vilnius, Lithuania	TKO (punches)	2	
For the KOK WGP 2015 Heavyweight Tournament.
2015-11-14	Win	(Poland) Michal Turynski	KOK World GP 2015 In Vilnius - Heavyweight Tournament Final	Vilnius, Lithuania	Decision (unanimous)	3	3:00
2015-09-26	Win	(Suriname) Colin George	KOK World GP 2015 - Heavyweight Tournament, Quarter Finals	Chișinău, Moldova	KO	2	2:50
2015-07-30	Win	(Belarus) Igor Bugaenko	Yangame's Fight Night 3	Prague, Czech Republic	Decision (unanimous)	3	3:00
2015-04-25	Win	(Slovakia) Martin Pacas	Gala Night Thaiboxing/ Enfusion Live 28	Žilina, Slovakia	Decision	3	3:00
2015-01-03	Loss	(Ukraine) Roman Kryklia	Kunlun Fight 15: The World MAX Return - Super Heavyweight Tournament, Final 16	Nanjing, China	КО (high kick)	1	0:30
2014-06-12	Win	(Romania) Cătălin Moroșanu	Gibu Fight Night	Prague, Czech Republic	Decision (unanimous)	3	3:00
2014-04-26	Win	(France) Daniel Lentie	Gala Night Thaiboxing/ Enfusion Live 17	Žilina, Slovakia	Decision (unanimous)	3	3:00
2014-03-08	Win	(Belgium) Kirk Krouba	Glory 14: Zagreb	Zagreb, Croatia	Decision (unanimous)	3	3:00
2013-12-13	Win	(Croatia) Igor Mihaljević	FFC10: Rodriguez vs. Batzelas	Skopje, Macedonia	Decision (unanimous)	3	3:00
2013-10-25	Win	(Netherlands) Jahfarr Wilnis	FFC08: Zelg vs. Rodriguez	Zagreb, Croatia	Decision (unanimous)	3	3:00
2013-06-14	Win	(Romania) Sebastian Ciobanu	Time of Gladiators	Brno, Czech Republic	Decision (unanimous)	3	3:00
Wins "King of the Ring" K-1 Rules Super Heavyweight World Championship.
2013-04-27	Win	(Belgium) Kirk Krouba	Gala Night Thaiboxing	Žilina, Slovakia	Decision (unanimous)	3	3:00
2012-12-30	Win	(Bosnia and Herzegovina) Elmin Živčić	King Combat Promotions	Prague, Czech Republic	KO (high kick)	2	
2012-11-10	Win	(Ukraine) Dmytro Bezus	SUPERKOMBAT World Grand Prix 2012 Final Elimination	Craiova, Romania	DQ (illegal spinning elbow)	3	N/A
2012-10-27	Win	(Belarus) Alexey Ignashov	Nitrianska Noc Bojovnikov	Nitra, Slovakia	Decision (unanimous)	3	3:00
2012-05-26	Win	(Ukraine) Dmytro Bezus	Profiliga Muaythai 12	Banská Bystrica, Slovakia	Decision (unanimous)	3	3:00
2012-03-31	Win	(United Kingdom) Daniel Sam	Gala night Thaiboxing	Žilina, Slovakia	Decision (unanimous)	3	3:00
2011-12-30	Win	(Turkey) Fathi Cam	Enfusion Kickboxing Tournament '11, Super fight	Prague, Czech Republic	KO (left hook)	2	
2011-09-02	Loss	(Australia) Nathan Corbett	Muaythai Premier League: Round 1	Long Beach, CA, United States	KO (punches)	1	2:38
2011-06-30	Loss	(Suriname) Ismael Londt		Prague, Czech Republic	Decision (unanimous)	3	3:00
2011-06-03	Win	(Russia) Shamil Abasov	Benlee Cup II	Bratislava, Slovakia	KO (knee)	2	
2011-03-12	Win	(Turkey) Erhan Deniz	Gala night Thaiboxing	Žilina, Slovakia	Decision	3	3:00
2010-12-11	Win	(Belarus) Alexey Ignashov	Yiannis Evgenikos presents: It's Showtime Athens	Athens, Greece	Decision (4–1)	3	3:00
2010-05-29	Loss	(Albania) Rustemi Kreshnik	It's Showtime 2010 Amsterdam	Amsterdam, Netherlands	Decision	3	3:00
2010-02-13	Win	(Greece) Andonias Tzoros	It's Showtime 2010 Prague	Prague, Czech Republic	TKO	2	
2009-10-16	Win	(Suriname) Ashwin Balrak	Return of the Gladiators	Amsterdam, Netherlands	Decision (unanimous)	3	3:00
Wins "King of the Ring" K-1 Rules Super Heavyweight World Championship.
2009-06-25	Win	(Curaçao) Wendell Roche	Gladiators Games	Prague, Czech Republic	Decision	3	3:00
2009-05-16	Loss	(Romania) Daniel Ghiță	It's Showtime 2009 Amsterdam	Amsterdam, Netherlands	TKO (ref. stop/left low kicks)	2	
2009-04-11	Win	(Brazil) Anderson Silva	Amsterdam Fight Club, Final	Amsterdam, Netherlands	Decision	3	3:00
Wins Amsterdam Fight Club WMTA 4man tournament title.
2009-04-11	Win	(Netherlands) Benjey Zimmerman	Amsterdam Fight Club, Semi Final	Amsterdam, Netherlands			
2009-01-29	Loss	(Portugal) Humberto Evora	Champions League, Semi Final	Lisbon, Portugal	Decision (split)	3	3:00
2008-12-14	Win	(Russia) Oleg Zdragus	Gladiator		Decision	3	3:00
2008-11-08	Win	(Switzerland) Petar Majstorović	Janus Fight Night "The Legend"	Padua, Italy	Decision	3	3:00
2008-10-05	Win	(Brazil) Anderson Silva	Tough Is Not Enough	Rotterdam, Netherlands	Decision (unanimous)	3	3:00
Wins W.I.P.U. "King of the Ring" K-1 Rules Super Heavyweight Super Title.
2008-09-20	Win	(Slovenia) Robo Gregor	Profiliga Muay Thai VIII	Bratislava, Slovakia	Decision	3	3:00
2008-05-31	Win	(Angola) Henriques Zowa	Muay Thai Fight Night	Switzerland	Decision (unanimous)	3	3:00
2007-12-24	Loss	(Suriname) Ashwin Balrak	Return of The King 2	Paramaribo, Suriname	Decision (unanimous)	3	3:00
2007-10-27	Loss	(Belarus) Alexei Kudin	Angels of Fire II		Decision (unanimous)	3	3:00
2007-04-14	Win	(Belarus) Sergei Gur	K-1 Italy Oktagon 2007, Final	Milan, Italy	Decision	3	3:00
Wins K-1 Italy Oktagon 2007 tournament title.
2007-04-14	Win	(France) Brice Guidon	K-1 Italy Oktagon 2007, Semi Finals	Milan, Italy	Decision (2–1)	3	3:00
2007-04-14	Win	(Russia) Djamal Kasumov	K-1 Italy Oktagon 2007, Quarter Finals	Milan, Italy	Decision	3	3:00
2006-12-22	Win	(Switzerland) Slavo Polugic	WKN Kickboxing in Prague	Prague, Czech Republic	TKO	1	
Wins WKN Kickboxing Intercontinental Oriental Rules Championship.
2006-10-28	Win	(Germany) Tony Scanzano	Die K-1 Superfighter Gala	Germany	Decision	3	3:00
2005-10-22	Loss	(Austria) David Keclik	SuperLeague Heavy Knockout 2005	Vienna, Austria	Decision	3	3:00
2005-06-24	Win	(Croatia) Igor Jurković	Fighters' Night	Krupka, Czech Republic	Decision	5	2:00
2005-04-22	Win	(Greece) Thomas Adamantopoulos	Czech Grand Prix Thaiboxing II	Czech Republic	TKO	1	
2004-11-26	Loss	(Netherlands) Errol Zimmerman	Kings of the Ring: Prestige Fights	Brno, Czech Republic	Decision (split)	5	2:00
2004-07-02	Win	(Thailand) Leonard Sitpholek	Kings of the Ring: World GP 85 kg, Final	Brno, Czech Republic	Decision (unanimous)	3	3:00
Wins Kings of the Ring: World GP 85 KG tournament title.
2004-07-02	Win	(Netherlands) Errol Zimmerman	Kings of the Ring: World GP 85 kg, Semi Finals	Brno, Czech Republic	Decision (majority)	3	3:00
2004-07-02	Win	(Sweden) Frederic Rosenberg	Kings of the Ring: World GP 85 kg, Quarter Finals	Brno, Czech Republic	TKO	1	2:05
2004-04-17	Loss	(Australia) Gürkan Özkan	Kings Of The Ring Banja Luka, Semi Finals	Banja Luka, Bosnia and Herzegovina	Decision (split)	3	3:00
2004-03-06	Win	(Albania) Tahir Cerkinaj	Kings Of The Ring	Pristina, Serbia and Montenegro	TKO (towel thrown)	3	

== See also ==
- List of K-1 champions
- List of male kickboxers
