= Nathan Corbett =

Australian Muay Thai kickboxer

- Born: Nathan Corbett; 23 October 1979 (age 46); Hamilton, New Zealand
- Other names: Carnage; The Man with the Golden Elbows
- Nationality: Australian
- Height: 1.84 m (6 ft 1/2 in)
- Weight: 94.2 kg (208 lb; 14.83 st)
- Division: Heavyweight (2010–); Cruiserweight (2002–2009); Light-heavyweight
- Reach: 73.5 in (187 cm)
- Style: Muay Thai (Muay Sok), kickboxing
- Stance: Orthodox
- Fighting out of: Gold Coast, Queensland, Australia
- Team: Urban Fight Gym
- Trainer: Richard Walsh
- Years active: 1997–2014

Kickboxing record
- Total: 65
- Wins: 59
- By knockout: 44
- Losses: 5
- By knockout: 3
- No contests: 1

Other information
- Occupation: Coach, sports commentator, author
- Website: www.carnagecorbett.com
- Last updated on: 4 April 2019

Nathan "Carnage" Corbett (born 23 October 1979) is a New Zealand-born Australian former Muay Thai kickboxer, who has held 11 world titles in three weight-divisions.

Hailing out of the Urban Fight Gym, Gold Coast, Queensland, Corbett was the World Muaythai Council (WMC) Cruiserweight World champion, the K-1 Scandinavia 2007 tournament champion, the World Boxing Council Muaythai (WBC Muaythai) Cruiserweight World Champion and former World Kickboxing Network (WKN) Heavyweight Muay Thai Champion (including three defenses).

== Biography and career ==
Nathan Corbett started practicing martial arts with karate at the age of 14, which then led him to shoot boxing and Muay Thai.

Corbett turned professional in 1997 and rose to national prominence in 2002 when he defeated Scott Bannon with a slicing right elbow. He then followed up with a 1st-round knock out win over Clifton Brown, winning his first WMC World Title.

On 26 June 2005 at the Xplosion 10 event in Australia, Corbett won his second WMC World Title over Magomed Magomedov.

At the 3rd MARS World Fighting GP in Chiba, Japan in 2006 he suffered his first KO loss of his career against American Heavyweight Alex Roberts.

=== Corbett vs. Spong I ===
Corbett faced Tyrone Spong for the first time in Jamaica in 2009 in a highly anticipated bout of heavyweight kickboxing

In what was considered a controversial bout Corbett knocked Spong down in the third round. Spong, managed to rise back to his feet, however referee Paolo Tocha stopped the fight as Spong was visibly staggering. As the signal was given to stop the fight, Corbett misinterpreted this as a restart and began to strike Spong further. This led to referee Tocha stopping the fight altogether and ruling the bout a no contest.

He was scheduled to face Nikolaj Falin at Kings of Kombat 8 in Melbourne on 8 December 2012 but his opponent pulled out due to health issues.

He was then reported to be fighting Dzianis Hancharonak at Total Carnage III on the Gold Coast on 9 March 2013 but Hancharonak was already due to face another opponent close to that date and did not accept the fight, and so Javlon Nazarov stepped in. Finally, Nazarov was replaced by Kamil Sokolowski of Poland. Sokolowski began the contest with heavy pressure but was countered viciously with knees and finally a right elbow to his temple handing Corbett a KO victory 20 seconds into the first round.

=== Corbett vs. Spong II ===
He signed a two-fight contract with Glory in July 2013. In his long-awaited rematch with Tyrone Spong at Glory 11: Chicago - Heavyweight World Championship Tournament in Hoffman Estates, Illinois, United States on 12 October 2013, he was dropped twice with left hooks in round two and lost by TKO.

At Total Carnage IV held in Gold Coast on 14 December 2013, Nathan Corbett took a second round elbow TKO win over Henriques Zowa, defending the WKN Heavyweight Muay Thai World Title.

=== Corbett vs. Saki ===
Competing for the inaugural Glory Light Heavyweight Championship, he fought in the Glory 15: Istanbul - Light Heavyweight World Championship Tournament in Istanbul, Turkey on 12 April 2014. In the semi-finals against Gökhan Saki, Corbett was struck with a left overhand to the ear, or what's infamously referred to as the "Saki Bomb". Corbett's ear exploded, which led to part of the ear openly hanging off. The ringside physician intervened and referee Al Wichgers called a halt to the fight at the 2:35 of Round 1, handing Corbett a TKO loss and eliminating him from the tournament.

In a twisted turn of events, Saki would go on to face Tyrone Spong in the finals. 1:30 into Round 1 Spong attempted a right low kick from the southpaw stance. Saki, standing orthodox, checked the kick, resulting in Spongs leg breaking. Spong then stepped back onto the broken leg before falling to the canvas. The referee immediately stopped the bout.

== Personal life ==
Corbett currently lives in California, USA. He continues to train and teach Muay Thai.

He actively travels, co-leading the Ronin-Carnage Team alongside Misa Ronin in Novi Sad, Serbia.

He is a regular contributor to FIGHTMAG, where he writes the 'Carnage Diary'.

In 2017 Corbett launched the Ultimate Warrior Retreat in Bali, Indonesia.

== Titles ==
Over the course of 10 years, Corbett collected 11 prestigious World title belts.

- World Kickboxing Network
  - 2013 W.K.N. Muay Thai Heavyweight World Champion
  - 2013 W.K.N. Muay Thai Heavyweight World Champion
  - 2012 W.K.N. Muay Thai Heavyweight World Champion
  - 2010 W.K.N. Muay Thai Heavyweight World Champion
- A-1 World Combat Cup
  - 2010 A-1 World Combat Cup Heavyweight Tournament Champion
- World Independent Promoters Union
  - 2009 W.I.P.U. King of the Ring Champion
- K-1
  - 2007 K-1 Fighting Network Scandinavian Qualification Champion
- World Boxing Council Muaythai
  - 2005 W.B.C. Muay Thai Light Heavyweight World Champion
- World Muaythai Council
  - 2005–06 W.M.C. Muay Thai Cruiserweight World Champion
  - 2003 W.M.C. Muay Thai Light Heavyweight World Champion
- International Muaythai Federation
  - 2005 I.M.F. World Champion

== Kickboxing record ==
Kickboxing record
59 wins (44 (T)KOs, 15 decisions), 5 losses, 1 no contest
Date	Result	Opponent	Event	Location	Method	Round	Time	Record
2014-04-12	Loss	(Netherlands) Gökhan Saki	Glory 15: Istanbul – Light Heavyweight World Championship Tournament, Semi Finals	Istanbul, Turkey	TKO (ear injury)	1	2:35	59–5–1
2013-12-14	Win	(Angola) Henriques Zowa	Total Carnage IV	Gold Coast, Australia	TKO (left elbow)	2	1:47	59–4–1
Retains W.K.N. Muay Thai World title −95kg.
2013-10-12	Loss	(Suriname) Tyrone Spong	Glory 11: Chicago	Hoffman Estates, Illinois, USA	TKO (left hook)	2	1:10	58–4–1
2013-03-09	Win	(Poland) Kamil Sokolowski	Total Carnage III	Gold Coast, Australia	KO (right elbow)	1	0.20	58–3–1
Retains W.K.N. Muay Thai World title −95kg.
2012-09-01	Win	(Australia) Steve McKinnon	Total Carnage II	Gold Coast, Australia	Decision (unanimous)	5	3:00	57–3–1
2012-06-23	Win	(Romania) Adrian Marc	Kings of Kombat 7	Melbourne, Australia	TKO (low kick)	1		56–3–1
2012-04-07	Win	(France) Stéphane Susperregui	Fight Night Total Carnage	Gold Coast, Australia	Decision	5	3:00	55–3–1
Retains W.K.N. Muay Thai World title −95kg.
2011-11-06	Win	(France) Abdarhmane Coulibaly	Muaythai Premier League: Round 3	The Hague, Netherlands	Decision (unanimous)	3	3:00	54–3–1
2011-09-02	Win	(Czech Republic) Tomáš Hron	Muaythai Premier League: Round 1	Long Beach, CA, United States	KO (punches)	1	2:38	53–3–1
2011-04-16	Win	(Poland) Piotr Lepich	Domination 6	Mirrabooka, Australia	KO (elbow)	1	2:59	52–3–1
2010-11-27	Win	(Spain) Frank Muñoz	Evolution 22	Gold Coast, Australia	TKO (referee stoppage)	3		51–3–1
2010-09-19	Win	(Ukraine) Pavel Zhuravlev	Domination 5	Perth, Australia	KO (knee strike)	4	1:19	50–3–1
Wins vacant W.K.N. Muay Thai World title −95kg.
2010-06-09	Win	(Tonga) Cedric Kongaika	Last Man Standing 2, final	Melbourne, Australia	Decision (unanimous)	3	3:00	49–3–1
Wins A-1 World Combat Cup Heavyweight tournament title.
2010-06-09	Win	(Australia) Thor Hoopman	Last Man Standing 2, semi final	Melbourne, Australia	Decision (unanimous)	3	3:00	48–3–1
2010-06-09	Win	(Australia) Shane Tilyard	Last Man Standing 2, quarter final	Melbourne, Australia	TKO (referee stoppage)	2	1:32	47–3–1
2009-08-08	Win	(Cape Verde) Michael Andrade	Xplosion Super Fight 19	Gold Coast, Australia	TKO (referee stoppage)	2	2:52	46–3–1
2009-06-26	NC	(Suriname) Tyrone Spong	Champions of Champions 2	Montego Bay, Jamaica	NC (original KO for Corbett)	3		45–3–1
2009-05-29	Win	(Croatia) Sinisa Andrijasevic	Brute Force 11	Melbourne, Australia	KO (knee strike)	1		45–3
Wins W.I.P.U. King of the Ring World title.
2009-04-04	Win	(France) Emmanuel Payet	Evolution 16	Brisbane, Australia	TKO (leg kick)	2		44–3
2008-12-06	Win	(New Zealand) Tony Angelov	Evolution 15 "The Contender Qualifier"	Brisbane, Australia	KO (left hook)	2	1:41	43–3
2008-09-04	Win	(Thailand) Wehaj KingBoxing	Evolution 14 "The Contenders"	Brisbane, Australia	KO (elbow strike)	2		42–3
2008-04-26	Win	(Thailand) Leonard Sitpholek	Evolution 13 "Carnival of Carnage"	Brisbane, Australia	TKO (doctor stoppage)	3		41–3
2008-03-29	Win	(Germany) Mike Sbrzesny	Xplosion 18 Super Fights	Sydney, Australia	TKO (doctor stoppage)	1		40–3
2007-12-08	Win	(Turkey) Recai Celik	Xplosion 17	Sydney, Australia	KO (punches)	1	2:59	39–3
Retains W.M.C. Muay Thai World title.
2007-09-01	Win	(Slovakia) Erik Kosztanko	Evolution 11 "Night of Carnage"	Brisbane, Australia	KO	3	2:01	38–3
2007-06-22	Win	(Thailand) Kaoklai Kaennorsing	Xplosion Super Fights	Gold Coast, Australia	KO (punches)	2	2:48	37–3
2007-05-19	Win	(Suriname) Ashwin Balrak	K-1 Scandinavia GP 2007	Stockholm, Sweden	Decision (unanimous)	3	3:00	36–3
Wins K-1 Scandinavia 2007 tournament title.
2007-05-19	Win	(Kazakhstan) Teodor Sariyev	K-1 Scandinavia GP 2007	Stockholm, Sweden	Decision (unanimous)	3	3:00	35–3
2007-05-19	Win	(Albania) Azem Maksutaj	K-1 Scandinavia GP 2007	Stockholm, Sweden	TKO	2	2:40	34–3
2006-11-11	Win	(Canada) Clifton Brown	Xplosion Macau	Macau, China	KO (uppercut)	2		33–3
Retains W.M.C. Muay Thai World title −86kg.
2006-08-18	Win	(Australia) Steve McKinnon	Xplosion 13	Sydney, Australia	TKO (doctor stoppage)	4		32–3
2006-05-15	Loss	(United States) Alex Roberts	3rd MARS World Fighting GP	Chiba, Japan	KO (right high kick)	2	1:57	31–3
2005-12-10	Win	(Japan) Magnum Sakai	Xplosion 12 WBC Muay Thai Event	Gold Coast, Australia	TKO (elbow strikes)	3		31–2
Wins vacant W.B.C. Muay Thai World title −79kg.
2005-09-09	Win	(South Korea) Kwak-Yun Sub	Xplosion 2005 Hong Kong	Hong Kong	KO (elbow strike)	1		30–2
Wins I.M.F. Muay Thai World title −86kg.
2005-08-28	Loss	(Japan) Noboru Uchida	Titans 2nd	Japan	DQ (kicked downed opponent)	1		29–2
2005-06-25	Win	(Russia) Magomed Magomedov	K-1 Challenge 2005 Xplosion X	Sydney, Australia	Decision (unanimous)	5	3:00	29–1
Wins W.M.C. Muaythai World title −86kg.
2005-04-15	Win	(Thailand) Kiattisak Hemkajit	Xplosion 9	Sydney, Australia	TKO	2		28–1
2004-12-18	Win	(Japan) Tatsufumi Tomihira	K-1 Challenge 2004 Oceania vs World	Gold Coast, Australia	Decision (unanimous)	3	3:00	27–1
2004-11-07	Win	(South Korea) Myeon Ju Lee	Titans 1st	Kitakyushu, Japan	TKO (corner stop./towel)	3	1:25	26–1
2004-09-19	Win	(Brazil) Nilson de Castro	Shoot Boxing World Tournament 2004	Yokohama, Japan	KO (left hook)	2	1:52	25–1
2004-08-27	Win	(Belgium) Jean Wanet	Evolution 2	Brisbane, Australia	KO	1		24–1
2004-07-23	Win	(New Zealand) Aaron Boyes	Supreme Carnage	Australia	KO	1		23–1
2004-06-26	Win	(New Zealand) Jayson Vemoa	Boonch Cup Muay Thai Event	Gold Coast, Australia	KO (knee strike)	1		22–1
2004-05-22	Win	(Australia) Brett Franklin	Samurai Explosion	Sydney, Australia	KO (left punch)	1		21–1
2004-05-16	Win	(Russia) Magomed Magomedov	WMC World Title in Hong Kong	Hong Kong	Decision (unanimous)	5	3:00	20–1
2003-12-16	Win	(Canada) Clifton Brown	Xplosion Super Fight Vol. 5	Gold Coast, Australia	KO (overhead elbow)	1	2:54	19–1
Wins W.M.C. Muay Thai World title −82kg.
2003-08-08	Win	(Australia) Danny Maskacheff	Boonchu Cup Warriors of Muay Thai	Gold Coast, Australia	KO (left uppercut elbow)	2		18–1
2003-06-01	Win	(Japan) Koji Iga	Shootboxing – S of the World vol.3	Japan	KO (punches)	2	0:57	17–1
2003-04-27	Win	(Australia) Blair Hinds	Xplosion 4 Shootboxing vs Muay Thai 3	Australia	TKO (referee stoppage)	4		16–1
2002-12-15	Win	(Japan) Koji Iga	Xplosion 3 – Kings Of Champions	Australia	TKO	4		15–1
2002-09-21	Win	(Australia) Chris Johnson	S-Mac Event	Gold Coast, Australia	TKO (kicks)	5		14–1
2002-07-28	Win	(Australia) Chad Walker	Muay Thai Uprising Boonchu Cup	Gold Coast, Australia	Decision (unanimous)	5	3:00	13–1
2002-07-07	Win	(Japan) Yu Ikeda	Shoot Boxing World Tournament 2002	Tokyo, Japan	KO (punches)	2	1:07	12–1
2002-04-18	Win	(Australia) Scott Bannan		Brisbane, Australia	TKO (referee stoppage)	2		11–1
2002-03-16	Win	(Australia) Steve Delyster	Muay Thai Explosion Boonchu Cup	Gold Coast, Australia				10–1
2001-07-08	Win	(Australia) Kelly Witchard	X-plosion On Jupiters!	Gold Coast, Australia	KO			9–1
2001-05-12	Loss	(Poland) Paul Slowinski	Light Heavyweight Super 8	Brisbane, Australia	Decision (unanimous)	3	3:00	8–1
2001-03-18	Win	(Australia) Steve Delyster	Boonchu Cup 2	Gold Coast, Australia	KO (left body rip)	3		8–0
2000-05-20	Win	(Australia) John Woods	Boonchu Cup 1	Gold Coast, Australia	KO	2		7–0
2000	Win	(Papua New Guinea) Stanley Nandex	Jimmy Cass Show	Queensland, Australia	Decision	5	3:00	6–0
Legend: Win Loss Draw/no contest Notes

== See also ==
- List of K-1 champions
- List of male kickboxers
