= César Córdoba =

Spanish kickboxer

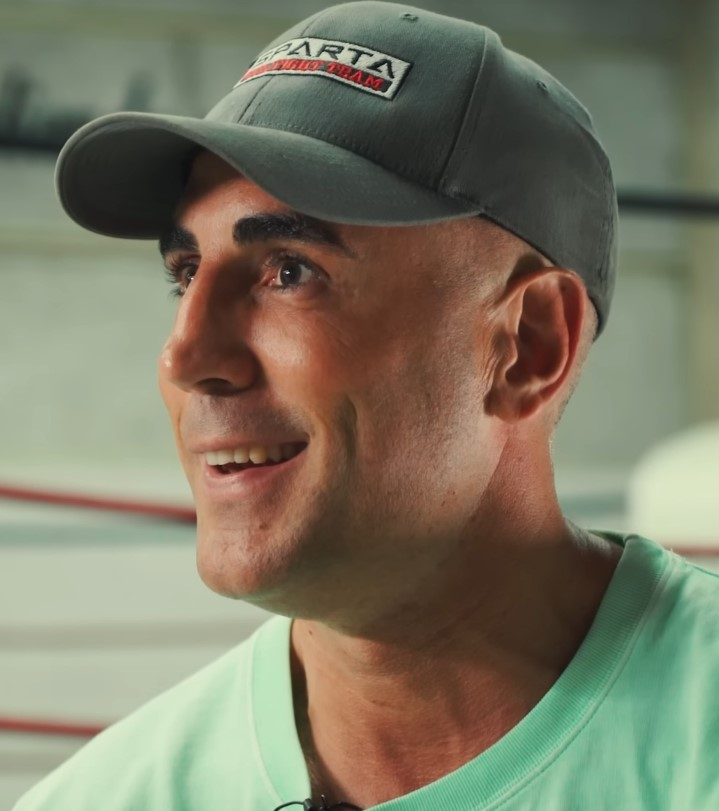
- Born: César Córdoba Avilés; 23 October 1980 (age 45); Barcelona, Spain
- Other names: El Cazador (The Hunter)
- Nationality: Spanish
- Height: 1.87 m (6 ft 1 1/2 in)
- Weight: 85 kg (187 lb; 13 st 5 lb)
- Division: Cruiserweight
- Style: Kickboxing; Boxing
- Fighting out of: Barcelona, Spain
- Team: Club Sparta

Professional boxing record
- Total: 13
- Wins: 11
- By knockout: 9
- Losses: 2
- By knockout: 2

Kickboxing record
- Total: 53
- Wins: 50
- By knockout: 41
- Losses: 1
- Draws: 2

Other information
- Boxing record from BoxRec

César Córdoba (born 23 October 1980) is a Spanish professional kickboxer and boxer, two times WKN World Champion.

== Titles ==
=== Kickboxing ===
- 2011 WKL K-1 Rules World Champion
- 2010 WKN Oriental Rules Super Light Heavyweight World Champion -85.5 kg.
- 2005 WKN Oriental Rules Super Middleweight World Champion -79,4 kg.
- Spanish Kickboxing Champion

=== Boxing ===
- 2014 Spanish Cruiserweight Champion
- 2008 BOXAM Champion

== Kickboxing record ==
Professional kickboxing record
Date	Result	Opponent	Event	Location	Method	Round	Time
2015-02-07	Win	(Spain) Frank Muñoz	International Fighting Championship 2	Barcelona, Spain	Decision (unanimous)	3	3:00
2014-07-25	Win	(Suriname) Melvin Manhoef	International Fighting Championship	Badalona, Spain	TKO (referee stoppage)	1	2:59
2013-03-09	Draw	(Armenia) Sahak Parparyan	Enfusion Live: Barcelona	Barcelona, Spain	Decision draw	3	3:00
2011-11-19	Win	(Netherlands) Fred Sikking	King Of Warriors	Barcelona, Spain	KO	1	
Wins WKL K-1 Rules World Championship.
2011-07-03	Win	(Spain) Pruden Cabrera	Fight 4 Life	Barcelona, Spain	Decision	3	3:00
2010-12-12	Draw	(Spain) Lorenzo Javier Jorge		Santa Cruz de Tenerife, Spain	Decision (draw)	3	3:00
2010-10-23	Win	(Guadeloupe) Bruno Brendan	Fight 4 Life	Barcelona, Spain	KO	1	
Wins WKN Oriental Rules Super Light Heavyweight World Championship -85.5 kg.
2010-03-27	Win	(Netherlands) Said El Bouanani	Fight 4 Life	Barcelona, Spain	Decision	5	3:00
2009-11-28	Win	(Spain) Ibrahim Lopez		Tenerife, Spain	KO	2	
2006-05-06	Loss	(France) Sidy Kone	Champions League Kick Boxing	Santa Cruz de Tenerife, Canary Islands	KO (injury)	2	
2005-03-07	Win	(France) Aurélien Duarte			Decision	5	3:00
Wins WKN Oriental Rules Super Middleweight World Championship -79,4 kg.
2004-12-11	Win	(Italy) Roberto Cocco	Superliga 2004 Federacion Catalana	Barcelona, Spain	Decision	5	3:00
2003-12-20	Win	(France) Walid Haddad	K-1 Spain Grand Prix 2003 in Barcelona	Barcelona, Spain	KO		
Legend: Win Loss Draw/no contest Notes

== Boxing record ==
11 wins (9 knockouts, 2 decisions), 2 losses, 0 draws
Res.	Record	Opponent	Type	Rd., time	Date	Location	Notes
Loss	11–2	(Latvia) Ricards Bolotniks	TKO	1 (6)	2016-11-12	(Spain) Bilbao Exhibition Centre, Baracaldo, País Vasco	
Win	11–1	(France) Sylvain Luce	PTS	6	2016-05-14	(Spain) Pabellón de la Vall d'Hebron, Barcelona, Cataluña	
Win	10–1	(Georgia (country)) Giorgi Tevdorashvili	TKO	4 (6)	2016-02-13	(Spain) Pabellón de la Vall d'Hebron, Barcelona, Cataluña	
Loss	9–1	(Canada) Sylvera Louis	TKO	7 (8)	2015-10-24	(Spain) Pabellón de la Vall d'Hebron, Barcelona, Cataluña	
Win	9–0	(Latvia) Arturs Kulikauskis	TKO	4 (6)	2015-07-10	(Spain) Torrequebrada Hotel & Casino, Benalmadena, Andalucía	
Win	8–0	(Georgia (country)) Gogita Gorgiladze	TKO	2 (6)	2014-05-16	(Spain) Palacio de los Deportes, San Pedro de Alcántara, Andalucía	
Win	7–0	(Spain) Ibrahim Lopez	TKO	5 (10)	2014-11-01	(Spain) Pabellon Pancho Camurria, Santa Cruz de Tenerife, Islas Canarias	Spanish cruiserweight title.
Win	6–0	(France) Julien Guibaud Ribaud	TKO	1 (6)	2014-05-10	(Spain) Pabellon Sferic, Tarrasa, Catalonia	
Win	5–0	(Ecuador) Carlos Caicedo	KO	1 (4)	2014-02-15	(Spain) Pabellon Sferic, Tarrasa, Catalonia	
Win	4–0	(Spain) Alvaro Terrero	TKO	3 (6)	2013-02-02	(Spain) Tarrasa, Catalonia	
Win	3–0	(Bulgaria) Merdjidin Yuseinov	TKO	3 (6)	2012-04-14	(Spain) Barcelona, Catalonia	
Win	2–0	(Portugal) Nuno Lagarto	TKO	3 (4)	2011-10-15	(Spain) Barcelona, Catalonia	
Win	1–0	(Spain) Prudencio Cabrera	PTS	4 (4)	2011-07-03	(Spain) Sant Adria del Besos, Catalonia	

== See also ==
- List of male kickboxers
