= Magomed Magomedov (kickboxer) =

Russian martial artist

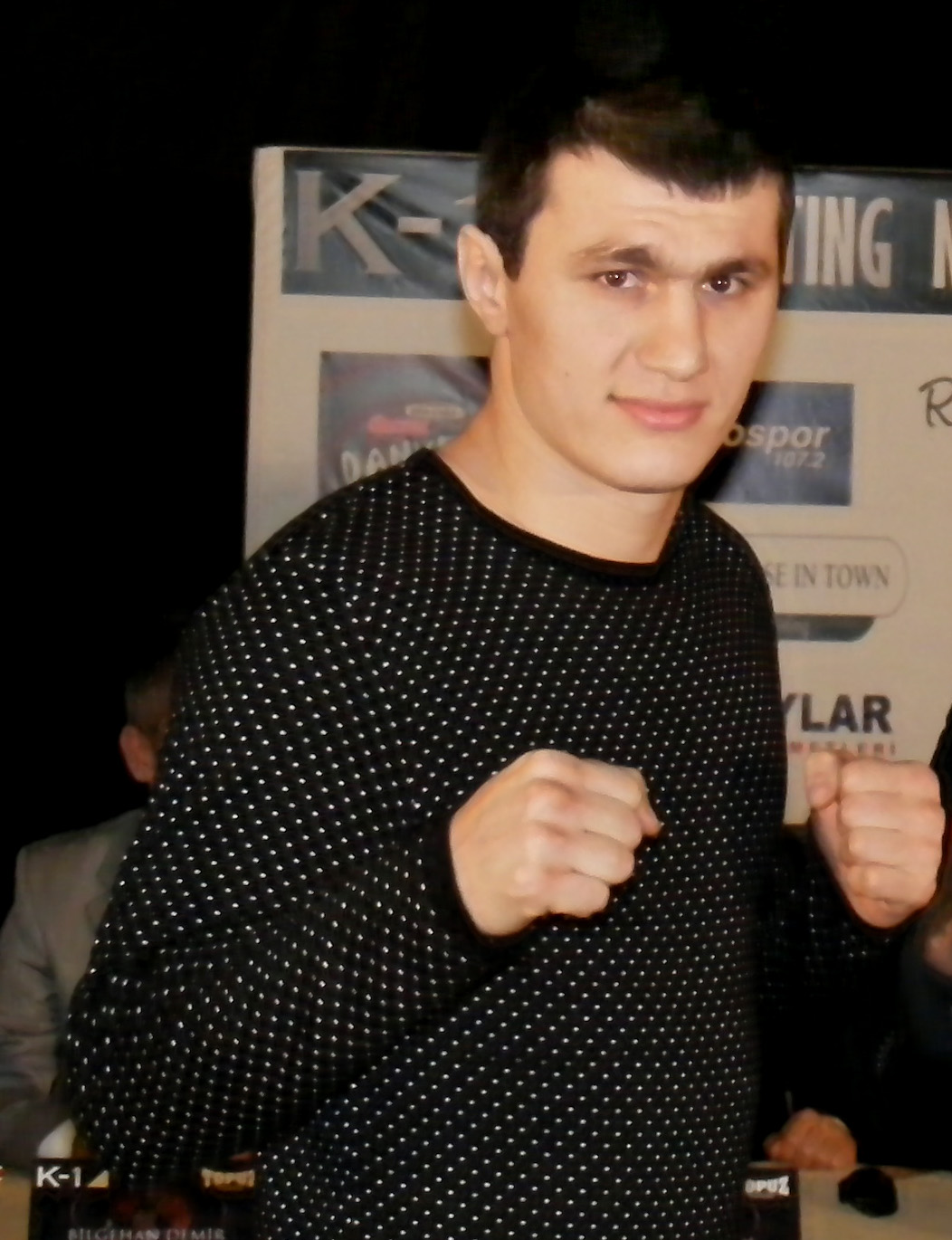
- Born: June 4, 1982 (age 44); Makhachkala, Dagestan ASSR, Russian SFSR, Soviet Union
- Native name: Магомед Магомедов
- Other names: The Propeller
- Height: 1.86 m (6 ft 1 in)
- Weight: 94 kg (207 lb; 14.8 st)
- Division: Heavyweight
- Style: Muay Thai, kickboxing
- Fighting out of: Minsk, Belarus
- Team: Scorpion Gym; Rompo Gym
- Trainer: Zainalbek Zainalbekov
- Years active: 1998–2007

Kickboxing record
- Total: 74
- Wins: 60
- By knockout: 28
- Losses: 12
- Draws: 2

Mixed martial arts record
- Total: 2
- Wins: 0
- Losses: 2
- By submission: 2

Amateur record
- Total: 115
- Wins: 100
- Losses: 15

Magomed "The Propeller" Magomedovich Magomedov (Russian: Магомед Магомедович Магомедов, born June 4, 1982) is a Russian former kickboxer fighting out of Chinuk Gyn from Minsk, Belarus. He was a six time amateur Russian kickboxing champion, European WAKO champion and as a professional he held the WMC, IMF Light Heavyweight World Muay Thai Champion and won three k-1 tournaments.

== Biography and career ==
Magomed Magomedov is an ethnic Avar, he was born in Makhachkala, Dagestan. Before turning pro he had over 100 wins as an amateur, was a two time Amateur World champion, European champion and six time Russian champion. He turned pro in 2001 and moved to Bangkok, Thailand. He started training at the Rompo Gym with his brothers Arslan and Alipdek Magomedov who both are professional fighters as well.

His first professional WMC World title match was in 2004, against Australian Nathan Corbett. Magomedov lost the five round battle by unanimous decision. A month later he moved down a weight class and won the WMC World Title against Clifton Brown.

In 2006 on his rookie year in K-1, he won two tournaments in Sweden and in Czech Republic and qualified for K-1 World GP 2007 in Amsterdam.

On August 12, 2006, he was scheduled to participate at K-1 World Grand Prix 2006 in Las Vegas II but the last moment visa problems kept him out of the United States. He was replaced by Gary Goodridge.

On November 2, 2007, at K-1 Fighting Network Turkey 2007 Magomedov fought against Gökhan Saki. After the fight there was a misunderstanding between both fighters, when Saki kicked him at the end of the match to instigate that he wants to hug him. Magomedov however, thought it was unsportsmanlike, and gave Saki a head butt. Then a brawl ensued, between trainers and managers, but ultimately, everything was settled and the two fighters gave each other a hand. Magomedov lost by unanimous decision.

== Titles ==
Professional

- 2007 K-1 Rules Heavyweight Tournament in Turkey champion -100 kg
- 2007 K-1 Fighting Network Prague champion -100 kg
- 2006 K-1 Rules "Le Grand Tournoi" runner up -100 kg
- 2006 K-1 Scandinavia Grand Prix champion -100 kg
- 2005 King's Birthday WMC-S1 Tournament Champion -90 kg
- 2005 I.M.F. world champion in Hong Kong
- 2005 PK1 Camp (Phuket) champion
- 2004 King's Birthday runner up in Bangkok
- 2004 W.M.C. Muaythai world champion -79.5 kg
- 2003 W.B.K.F. Golden Panther Cup champion -81 kg

Amateur

- 2004 W.A.K.O. European Championships (gold) -81 kg (Thai-boxing)
- 2001 Russian Thaiboxing champion (gold)
- 2000 Russian Thaiboxing champion (gold)
- 2000 European Thaiboxing champion (gold)
- 1999 World Amateur Muay Thai champion (gold)
- 1999 Russian Thaiboxing champion (gold)
- 1998 Russian Kickboxing champion (gold)

== Professional fight record ==
Professional kickboxing record
52 Wins (22 KOs), 12 losses, 1 draw
Date	Result	Opponent	Event	Location	Method	Round	Time
11.02.2007	Loss	(Turkey) Gokhan Saki	K-1 Fighting Network Turkey 2007	Istanbul, Turkey	Decision (Unanimous)	3	3:00
10.06.2007	Loss	(France) Alban Galonnier	TK2 World MAX 2007	Aix en Provence, France	Decision	5	2:00
09.07.2007	Win	(Croatia) Petar Majstorovic	Night of Fighters 4	Bratislava, Slovakia	Decision	3	3:00
06.23.2007	Loss	(Switzerland) Bjorn Bregy	K-1 World GP 2007 in Amsterdam	Amsterdam, Holland	KO (Punches)	2	2:12
Fails to qualify for the K-1 World GP 2007 Final 16.
06.23.2007	Win	(Ukraine) Maxim Neledva	K-1 World GP 2007 in Amsterdam	Amsterdam, Holland	Decision (Unanimous)	3	3:00
05.25.2007	Win	(Netherlands) Ricardo van den Bos	K-1 Ringmasters Fight Night	Istanbul, Turkey	TKO (Corner stoppage)	3	
03.10.2007	Win	(Germany) Stefan Leko	K-1 Fighting Network Croatia 2007	Split, Croatia	Etx.R Decision (Unanimous)	4	3:00
01.16.2007	Win	(Thailand) Kaoklai Kaennorsing	K-1 Rules Heavyweight Tournament 2007 in Turkey	Istanbul, Turkey	KO (Knee Strike)	1	2:59
Wins the K-1 Rules Heavyweight Tournament 2007 in Turkey.
01.16.2007	Win	(Turkey) Yahya Gulay	K-1 Rules Heavyweight Tournament 2007 in Turkey	Istanbul, Turkey	TKO (Low kicks)	2	1:14
12.16.2006	Win	(Croatia) Petar Majstorovic	K-1 Fighting Network Prague Round '07	Prague, Czech Republic	Decision	3	3:00
Wins the K-1 Fighting Network Prague Round '07 tournament.
12.16.2006	Win	(Netherlands) Koos Wessels	K-1 Fighting Network Prague Round '07	Prague, Czech Republic	Decision	3	3:00
12.16.2006	Win	(Bosnia and Herzegovina) Adnan Redzovic	K-1 Fighting Network Prague Round '07	Prague, Czech Republic	Decision	3	3:00
11.24.2006	Draw	(Sweden) Rickard Nordstrand	K-1 World MAX North European Qualification 2007	Stockholm, Sweden	Ext.R Draw	4	3:00
05.26.2006	Loss	(Croatia) Igor Jurković	Le Grand Tournoi`06, Final	Paris, France	Decision	3	3:00
Fight was for Le Grand Tournoi`06 (91 kg) tournament title.
05.26.2006	Win	(France) Stephane Gomis	Le Grand Tournoi`06, Semi final	Paris, France	Decision	3	3:00
05.26.2006	Win	(Czech Republic) Petr Kalenda	Le Grand Tournoi`06, Quarter final	Paris, France	KO		
05.20.2006	Win	(Sweden) Rickard Nordstrand	K-1 Scandinavia Grand Prix 2006	Stockholm, Sweden	Decision (Unanimous)	3	3:00
Wins the K-1 Scandinavia Grand Prix 2006.
05.20.2006	Win	(Curaçao) Errol Zimmerman	K-1 Scandinavia Grand Prix 2006	Stockholm, Sweden	Decision (Unanimous)	3	3:00
05.20.2006	Win	(Canada) Michael McDonald	K-1 Scandinavia Grand Prix 2006	Stockholm, Sweden	Decision (Unanimous)	3	3:00
12.15.2005	Win	(Iran) Mohamed Caesar	One Songchai Tsunai Show	Pattaya, Thailand	TKO	3	
12.05.2005	Win	(Croatia) Igor Jurković	King's Birthday: Le Grand Tournoi`06 qualification, Final	Bangkok, Thailand	Decision	3	3:00
Qualifies for Le Grand Tournoi`06.
12.05.2005	Win	(Kazakhstan) Teodor Sariyev	King's Birthday: Le Grand Tournoi`06 qualification, Semi final	Bangkok, Thailand	Decision (Majority)	3	3:00
09.09.2005	Win	(Thailand) Nuengtrakarn Por. Muang U-bon	Xplosion 2005	Hong Kong, China	KO (Punches)	1	
Wins the IMF World Muay Thai Light Heavyweight (175 lbs/79.38 kg) title.
06.25.2005	Loss	(Australia) Nathan Corbett	K-1 Challenge 2005 Xplosion X	Sydney, Australia	Decision (Unanimous)	5	3:00
For the WMC World Muay Thai Cruiser Weight (190 lbs/86.18 kg) title.
12.05.2004	Win	(Thailand) Apichai Tor. Prapadeang	King's Birthday: Le Grand Tournoi`05 qualification, Final	Bangkok, Thailand	TKO (Kicks)	3	
Qualifies for Le Grand Tournoi`05.
12.05.2004	Win	(Belarus) Nikolay Knyazev	King's Birthday: Le Grand Tournoi`05 qualification, Semi final	Bangkok, Thailand	Decision	3	3:00
06.17.2004	Win	(Canada) Clifton Brown		Bangkok, Thailand	Decision	5	3:00
Wins the WMC World Muay Thai Light Heavyweight (175 lbs/79.38 kg) title.
05.16.2004	Loss	(Australia) Nathan Corbett		Hong Kong, China	Decision	5	3:00
For the WMC World Muay Thai Super Light Heavyweight (182 lbs/82.55 kg) title.
03.04.2004	Loss	(Australia) John Wayne Parr	S-1 World Championships, Quarter final	Bangkok, Thailand	Decision	5	3:00
12.29.2003	Win	(Azerbaijan) Zabit Samedov	Golden Panther Cup, Final	Moscow, Russia	Decision (Split)	8	2:00
Wins Golden Panther Cup 81 kg tournament.
12.05.2003	Loss	(Suriname) Ashwin Balrak	King's Birthday: Le Grand Tournoi`04 qualification, Final	Bangkok, Thailand	Decision	3	3:00
Fails to qualify for Le Grand Tournoi`04.
12.05.2003	Win	(Spain) Roman Lopez	King's Birthday: Le Grand Tournoi`04 qualification, Semi final	Bangkok, Thailand	KO	2	
11.26.2003	Win	(Sudan) Faisal Zakaria	Golden Panther Cup, Semi final	Moscow, Russia	Decision (Unanimous)	5	2:00
11.26.2003	Win	(Ukraine) Dimirty Borulko	Golden Panther Cup, Quarter final	Moscow, Russia	Decision (Unanimous)	3	3:00
09.10.2003	Win	(Armenia) Yuri Barashyan	Golden Panther Cup, Final	Moscow, Russia	TKO (Low kicks)		
Wins Golden Panther Cup 81 kg tournament.
07.16.2003	Win	(Ukraine) Maxim Neledva	Golden Panther Cup, Semi final	Moscow, Russia	Decision (Unanimous)	3	3:00
07.16.2003	Win	(Russia) Vitaly Shemetov	Golden Panther Cup, Quarter final	Moscow, Russia	Decision (Unanimous)	3	3:00
06.18.2003	Win	(Belarus) Dmitry Shakuta	WBKF Superfights @ Club Arbat	Moscow, Russia	Decision	5	3:00
05.04.2001	Loss	(Slovenia) Gasper Cajner	Muaythai Gala Novo Mest	Novo Mesto, Slovenia	Decision	5	3:00
Legend: Win Loss Draw/No contest Notes

== Amateur fight record(incomplete) ==
Amateur kickboxing record
Wins, losses, draw
Date	Result	Opponent	Event	Location	Method	Round	Time
03.13.2003	Win	(Iran) Mohamed Azouam	IAMTF World Championships	Bangkok, Thailand			
Wins IAMTF World Muay Thai Championships 75kg gold medal.
Legend: Win Loss Draw/No contest Notes

== See also ==
- List of male kickboxers
