= Steve McKinnon =

Australian martial artist

- Born: 23 November 1976 (age 49); Glasgow, Scotland
- Other names: The Smashing Machine, God of War
- Nationality: Australian
- Height: 1.88 m (6 ft 2 in)
- Weight: 95.5 kg (211 lb; 15.04 st)
- Division: Heavyweight; Cruiserweight
- Style: Muay Thai, shotokan karate
- Stance: Orthodox
- Fighting out of: Sydney
- Team: Bulldog Gym
- Trainer: Stuart Mckinnon
- Rank: Black belt in Shotokan

Kickboxing record
- Total: 60
- Wins: 52
- By knockout: 30
- Losses: 8

Steve "The Smashing Machine" Mckinnon (born 23 November 1976 in Scotland) is a WBC Hall of Fame, 8 time world champion Australian, Heavyweight kickboxer, fighting out of the Bulldog Gym in Sydney. He competed in Glory and is the former WBC Muaythai Super Cruiserweight World Champion.

== Career ==
McKinnon began his training in his father's Karate school, Torakan, at the age of 4 in Shotokan Karate, attaining his black belt, fighting and winning Karate tournaments before he began his kickboxing career at 16. He faced many notable opponents such as Ashwin Balrak, Paul Slowinski, Nathan Corbett and Ramazan Ramazanov.

He won 8 world titles throughout his career, including winning the WBC world title in 2008 and defending it 3 times. He retired vacating that title.

His last fight was a WKBF world heavy weight title win in 2017.

In 2020 he was inducted into the WBC Hall of Fame.

McKinnon was set to face Nenad Pagonis at Glory 7: Milan in Milan, Italy, but his opponent changed to Michael Duut, whom he lost to via a unanimous decision. He then competed in the eight-man tournament at Glory 9: New York - 2013 95kg Slam in New York City on 22 June 2013 and lost against Filip Verlinden by decision in the quarter-finals.

== Titles ==
- WKBF World Title x 2 (2001 & 2017)
- World Boxing Council Muaythai | WBC Muaythai World Super Cruiserweight Champion. X 4 (2008, 2010, 2010, 2012)
- ISKA Australian Cruiserweight title
- IKKC Intercontinental Heavyweight Muay Thai Title
- New South Wales Muaythai Title

== Kickboxing record ==
Kickboxing record
48 Wins (30 (T)KO's), 8 Losses
Date	Result	Opponent	Event	Location	Method	Round	Time
2017-10-14	Win	(England) Joe Boobyer	Powerplay 35	Melbourne	Decision	3	3:00
2017-06-24	Win	(China) Su Zhihao	Wu Lin Feng 2017: Australia VS China	Sydney	Decision	3	3:00
2017-02-24	Win	(Greece) Theodosiadis Panagiotis	Prize Fighter 2	Melbourne	Decision (Unanimous)	3	3:00
2015-04-17	Loss	(Azerbaijan) Zabit Samedov	GFC Fight Series 3, Semi-finals	Dubai, UAE	Decision (Unanimous)	3	3:00
2014-11-15	Win	(New Zealand) Nato Lauuii	Capital Punishment – The Return of Bangin' Ben Edwards	Canberra, Australia	KO (Right High Kick)	1	
2013-11-23	Win	(Germany) Nikolaj Falin	Kings of Kombat 11	Australia	Decision (Unanimous)	3	3:00
2013-08-17	Win	(France) David Radeff	Star Wars: War of the Year	Sydney	Decision	3	3:00
2013-06-22	Loss	(Belgium) Filip Verlinden	Glory 9: New York – 95 kg Slam Tournament, Quarter Finals	New York City City	Decision (split)	3	3:00
2013-04-20	Loss	(Netherlands) Michael Duut	Glory 7: Milan	Milan, Italy	Decision (Unanimous)	3	3:00
2012-09-01	Loss	(Australia) Nathan Corbett	Total Carnage II	Gold Coast, Australia	Decision (Unanimous)	5	3:00
2012-06-09	Win	(Spain) Frank Muñoz	Singha Battle for the Belts	Bangkok, Thailand	KO	1	
Retains WBC Muaythai Super Cruiserweight World title.
2012-03-17	Win	(New Zealand) Nato Lauuii	Capital Punishment 5	Canberra, Australia	TKO (Elbows)	3	
2011-02-?	Win	(France) David Radeff	Enfusion Kickboxing Tournament '11, 2nd Round, super fight	Koh Samui, Thailand	Decision (Unanimous)	3	3:00
2010-12-19	Win	(France) Stephane Susperregui	WCK Muay Thai	Hainan Island, China	Decision (Majority)	5	3:00
Retains WBC Muaythai Super Cruiserweight World title.
2010-11-06	Win	(Brazil) Eduardo Maiorino	Immortality 3	Sydney	TKO	2	
Retains WBC Muaythai Super Cruiserweight World title.
2010-06-09	Win	(Poland) Paul Slowinski	Last Man Standing 2 Tournament, Semi-final	Melbourne	Decision (Majority)	3	3:00
2010-06-09	Win	(Greece) Andonis Tzoros	Last Man Standing 2 Tournament, Quarter Finals	Melbourne			
2009-11-13	Win	(Croatia) Hrvoje Kišiček	Immortallity Australia vs Croatia	Sydney	TKO (Cut)	2	3:00
2009-07-17	Loss	(China) Yu Jin	2009 World Wushu Tournament −80 kg Semi-finals	Guangzhou, China	Decision (unanimous)	5	3:00
2009-07-17	Win	(Russia) Muslim Salikhov	2009 World Wushu Tournament −80 kg Quarter Finals	Guangzhou, China	Decision	5	3:00
2009-05-14	Win	(Australia) Thor Hoopman	Immortality II: Battle of Gods	Sydney	Decision	5	3:00
2008-06-20	Win	(Suriname) Ashwin Balrak	International Muay Thai Fight Night	Montego Bay, Jamaica	Decision (unanimous)	5	3:00
Wins WBC Muaythai Super Cruiserweight World title.
2008-03-29	Win	(Australia) Thor Hoopman	Xplosion 18 Super Fights	Sydney	Decision (Unanimous)	5	3:00
2007-12-08	Loss	(Russia) Ramazan Ramazanov	Xplosion 17, WMC Intercontinental title 95 kg	Sydney	KO (Right hook)	4	2:51
Fight was for WMC Intercontinental Muay Thai Heavyweight title.
2006-08-18	Loss	(Australia) Nathan Corbett	Xplosion 13	Sydney	TKO (Doctor stoppage)	4	
2006-06-24	Win	(New Zealand) Jay Hepi	K-1 Kings of Oceania 2006 Round 1	Auckland, New Zealand	TKO (Injury)	2	
2005-6-14	Win	(France) Simon Dreus	Castle Hill muay thai	Las Vegas, USA	KO	1	2:45
Wins IKKC Intercontinental Heavyweight Muay Thai Title.
2004-04-16	Win	(New Zealand) Gareth Lewis		Sydney	KO (High kick)	4	
2004-02-29	Win	(Lebanon) Wissam Fattal	Tarik Solak Presents – Kickboxing Gala NSW	Sydney	KO (Left high kick)	2	
2002-12-13	Win	(Australia) Alofa Solitua	No Mercy	Sydney	TKO	3	
2001-09-01	Loss	(Poland) Paul Slowinski	JNI Promotions, Star City	Australia	KO (Left Highkick)	3	1:52
2000-10-27	Win	(Australia) Shane Meads	JNI Promotion	Sydney	KO	1	1:30
Wins ISKA Australian Cruiserweight title.
Legend: Win Loss Draw/No contest Notes
