= Vitaly Shemetov =

Russian mixed martial arts fighter

Personal information
- Native name: Vitaly Sergeevich Shemetov
- Nickname: The Dancing Russian
- Nationality: Russian
- Born: July 9, 1985 (age 41) USSR, Russia, Omsk
- Occupation: MMA fighter

Vitaly Sergeevich Shemetov (born July 9, 1985; USSR, Russia, Omsk) — Russian mixed martial arts fighter. Performs in the Japanese organization RIZIN. Master of sports of international class in Kickboxing, master of sports in Pankration, master of sports in Army hand-to-hand combat. Multiple champion of Russia, Europe and the World in mixed martial arts in Holland, Japan, China, Latvia, Greece and the US. Performs under the nickname «The Dancing Russian».

== Biography ==
Vitaly was born on July 9, 1985. in Omsk.

He studied at school "No. 33" until the 9th grade. He received his secondary education at school "No. 144" in his hometown.

He began to play sports actively at the age of six. At the age of seven, he enrolled in the Judo section of the Youth Sports School-17 and after a year of training received the first award in his sports career, won a gold medal at the city championship in Judo in the weight category up to 31 kg.

At the age of fourteen he had his first professional fight in the KRC "Arbat". He trained under the control of D.N. Repin and A.V. Cheremushkin. After that, he began to master the technique of Thai boxing under the control of O.V. Kudrinsky. He performed at the most prestigious Thai boxing tournaments, where he won the World Cup in Thai boxing in Belarus, Minsk according to (I.A.M.T.F.).

He also became the youngest participant and winner of the Armed Forces of the Russian Federation in memory of N.P. Chepika (2000).

By the age of sixteen, he received the highest possible title in this discipline "Master of Sports of Russia" in Army Hand-to-Hand Combat.

Heads the Shemetov Brothers Martial Arts Academy located in Omsk.

Is a MMA coach, among mixed martial arts at the highest level. Vitaly is known for his social activities and active citizenship, he is a follower of a healthy lifestyle and an active lifestyle.

== Titles and achievements ==
- European Kick Boxing Champion (IKF version), Greece (2001)
- Winner of the Thai Boxing World Cup (IMTF version) (2002)
- Winner of professional fights according to the WBKF version (2001), (2002), (2003), (2004), (2005), (2006)
- Champion of Russia in Thai boxing (2002)
- Russian Kick Boxing Champion (2003)
- Winner of professional fights on professional Kumite (2003)
- Winner of the Pancrase World Cup (2004)
- MMA Fighting Champion, Germany (2004)
- WFC Champion of Russia (2003), (2004)
- Professional Free-fight champion, Netherlands (2005)
- Absolute European Champion according to DRAKA, Latvia (2005)
- Participant of the tournament Russia – Spain, Shooto Belgium
- Winner of meetings among MMA professionals, Japan (2006)
- Semi—finalist of K1 – France, Marseille (2008)
- Winner of professional fights in the Netherlands in MMA (2008)
- 7 – time pankration champion of Russia
- 2 – time champion of Russia in army hand – to – hand combat
- The youngest champion, participant of the final of the sixth All-Russian tournament in army hand-to-hand combat in memory of Hero of the Soviet Union Nikolai Chepik (2000)
- Champion of Siberia and the Far East among Thai boxing professionals (2002)
- Participant of the professional Grand Prix tournament, heavyweights for the Kostya Tszyu Cup in professional boxing shemetov vs suleimanov (2011)
- European champion among kickboxing professionals RMO version (Turkey) (2011)
- Finalist of the K-1 regional Grand Prix (Turkey) (2009)
- Vice World champion among professionals according to KING OF THE RING (SHEMETOV VS BECAVEC) Croatia (2011)
- Finalist of the professional MMA tournament IFC IZRAIL SHEMETOV VS CECONI BRAZIL TEAM GRACIE (2012)
- World event X-1 Hawaiian Islands Shemetov vs Oyma (Japan) (2011)
- Vice champion of Russia among professionals kickboxing full contact WAKO pro (Shemetov vs Papin) (2011)
- Superboy according to W5 Shemetov vs Mineev
- Intercontinental Champion (cup pankratchion) (2011)
- Shemetov vs Luis Carlos Semao Banilha (Brazil)
- SHEMBROS manager in Russia Bob Saap superboy Legend −1

== Professional list of fights ==
- Vitaly Shemetov / Shungo OYAMA (14-19-0) – PRIDE; Dream; K-1 Hero; ROAD FC; RINGS; Pancras.
- Vitaly Shemetov / Ansar CHALANGOV (15-6-0) – UFC, M-1 Global.
- Vitaly Shemetov / Yuri Kiselov (6-5-0) – K-1, Hero. Vitaly Shemetov/Daniel TABERA (18-8-3) – Bellator, M-1 Global, KSW.
- Vitaly Shemetov / Stepan BEKAVACH (16-5-0) – FFK.
- Vitaly Shemetov/Robert Joch (21-8-0) – KSW, M-1 Global.
- Vitaly Shemetov/Poay SUGANUMA (12-4-0) — ELITE XC; K-1 Heroic; Pancras.
- Vitaly Shemetov / Dave DALGLISH (30-19-2) – Rings; M-1 Global; SWR
- Vitaly Shemetov / Sang SOO LI (16-11-0) – ROAD FC; M-1 Global.
- Vitaly Shemetov/Yuri GORBENKO (11-33-0).

== Professional statistics of fights ==
=== MMА ===
Number of battles	Victories	Defeats
37	24	12

=== Kickboxing ===
Number of battles	Victories	Defeats
104	93	11

== Public field of activity ==
Since 2006, Vitaly and his brother Sergey have been actively involved in social activities.

On December 8, 2006, Vitaly was waiting for the United Russia political party. Received a party card together with Sergei. Tasks were set for the development of their region, as well as stability and fundamentality for the inhabitants of their region.

Actively takes part in the social activities of the country. Conducts various master classes and seminars on mixed martial arts and FZK FC. Organizes sports and recreational activities for children and adults on the basis of the Academy of Martial Arts called "Shemetov Brothers", instilling a love for sports and a healthy lifestyle. She pays much attention to charity events in support of children from orphanages, orphanages and disadvantaged families. In the future, he organized various events and joined other ideological inspirers of charity.

August 9, 2016 – Vitaly Shemetov dedicated his victory at the European tournament to the 300th anniversary of Omsk. Participates in various programs and TV shootings, starred in commercials and photography.

In mid-2016, from the United Russia party, he planned to run as a candidate for the Legislative Assembly of the Omsk Region in 2016. Participated in negotiations with the chairmen of the Party, with the Mayor and the Governor of the Omsk region.

Later he suspended his political activities and continued his professional sports career, speaking under the Russian flag at international mixed martial arts tournaments.
