= Luis Tavares =

Dutch-Cape Verdean kickboxer

- Born: Luis Tavares; September 8, 1991 (age 35); Rotterdam, Netherlands
- Other names: The Infamous
- Height: 1.93 m (6 ft 4 in)
- Weight: 95 kg (209 lb; 14 st 13 lb)
- Division: Light Heavyweight; Heavyweight
- Style: Kickboxing, Muay Thai
- Stance: Orthodox
- Team: Mike's Gym
- Trainer: Mike Passenier

Kickboxing record
- Total: 79
- Wins: 66
- By knockout: 22
- Losses: 12
- By knockout: 2
- No contests: 1

Luis Tavares (born 8 September 1991) is a Dutch-Cape Verdean kickboxer. He is the former Enfusion Heavyweight and Super Heavyweight champion.

He was ranked as a top ten light heavyweight kickboxer by Combat Press as between May 2017 and April 2023, and by Beyond Kickboxing between October 2022 and November 2023.

== Early life ==
Tavares was born in Rotterdam, the Netherlands to Cape Verdean parents. He played youth football for Sparta Rotterdam, where he played together with Georgino Wijnaldum, Lerin Duarte and Garry Rodrigues but later switched to kickboxing.

== Kickboxing career ==
In December 2012, Tavares won his first professional title, the IRO 95 kg European title, with a fourth-round knockout of Rodney Glunder. In March 2014, Tavares won his first professional world title, the IKA 95 kg title, with a decision win against Hicham Achalhi. In between these title wins, Tavares made his Glory debut, losing by knockout to Artem Vakhitov.

In October 2015, Tavares participated in the WFL "Unfinished Business" Heavyweight tournament. He defeated Fred Sikking by decision in the semifinals, and Lorenzo Javier Jorge by an extra round decision in the finals.

=== Enfusion ===
At Enfusion 49, Tavares fought Mohamed Boubkari for the Enfusion Heavyweight title. He defeated Boubkari by a first-round knockout. Moving up to Super Heavyweight, Tavares fought the reigning champion Jahfarr Wilnis. He won by unanimous decision. He defended the title twice, knocking out Mrad Akram and Fatih Ulusoy.

In May 2018, he took part in the A1WCC Heavyweight tournament. He lost the quarterfinal bout to Donegi Abena by an extra round decision.

He fought Kamran Aminzadeh at Enfusion 69, in a non-title bout. Tavares won the fight by unanimous decision. He vacated the Enfusion title in September 2018, after signing with Glory.

=== Glory ===
His Glory debut came at Glory 62 against Artur Gorlov. He defeated him by split decision. His second fight was against Felipe Micheletti, at Glory 66. Micheletti won the fight by split decision.

Tavares faced Michael Duut at Glory 69. He won the fight by unanimous decision. Tavares was scheduled to fight Stéphane Susperregui at Glory Collision 2. He defeated Susperregui by unanimous decision. For his fifth Glory appearance, Tavares was scheduled to fight Donegi Abena at Glory 77. He won the fight by unanimous decision.

Tavares was scheduled to fight Sergej Maslobojev at Glory 78: Rotterdam. A month before the bout, Maslobojev withdrew due to injury and was replaced by Felipe Micheletti. Tavares won the rematch by unanimous decision.

Tavares was scheduled to challenge the reigning Glory Light Heavyweight champion Artem Vakhitov at Glory 80 on March 19, 2022. Tavares later withdrew from the fight, as he refused to face Vakhitov due to the 2022 Russian invasion of Ukraine.

Tavares was expected to face Horace Martin at Glory Rivals 1 on May 21, 2022. He was initially expected to face Tarik Khbabez at the same event, before Khbabez withdrew from the bout for undisclosed reasons. The event was later postponed, as The Lotto Arena announced that their cooperation with the Antwerp Fight Organisation had been terminated due to various administrative reasons.

Tavares faced Florent Kaouachi at Glory Rivals 1, a Glory and Enfusion cross-promotion event, on June 11, 2022. He won the fight by a third-round knockout. The result was overturned to a no contest on November 24, as Tavares tested positive for a banned substance.

==== Failed drug test and suspension ====
Tavares was expected to face the #3 ranked GLORY light heavyweight contender Sergej Maslobojev for the vacant Glory Light Heavyweight Championship at Glory 81: Ben Saddik vs. Adegbuyi 2 on August 20, 2022. The fight was cancelled on August 10, 2022, due to "reasons on the part of Tavares". Later that day, it was revealed that Tavares had tested positive for an unspecified banned substance at Glory Rivals 1. He was suspended indefinitely by Dutch Martial Arts Authority (VA), while Glory handed him a ten-month suspension.

==== Move to heavyweight ====
Tavares moved up to heavyweight to take part in the four-man Glory heavyweight tournament, held as a title eliminator for the interim Glory Heavyweight Championship. Tavares was expected to face Enver Sljivar, in the semifinals of the one-day tournament, at Glory 85 on April 29, 2023. Tavares withdrew from the bout on April 28, due to an undisclosed illness.

Tavares faced Bahram Rajabzadeh at Glory 86 on May 27, 2023. He lost the fight by a first-round knockout.

Tavares faced Bogdan Stoica at Glory 89 on October 7, 2023. He lost the fight by unanimous decision.

Tavares returned to Light Heavyweight and faced Ismael Lazaar at Glory Collision 8, on December 13, 2025. The bout was a Reserve bout for the Light Heavyweight Tournament. Tavares won the fight via unanimous decision.

Tavares faced Alin Nechita at Glory 105, on February 7, 2026. He lost the bout via split decision.

Tavares faced Mohamed Amine at Glory 107, on April 25, 2026. He won the bout via unanimous decision.

Tavares entered the Light Heavyweight Grand Prix for the vacant Glory Light Heavyweight Championship at Glory Collision 9, on June 13, 2026. He faced former Glory Middleweight Champion Donovan Wisse in the Quarterfinals. He went on to lose the bout via unanimous decision.

== Titles ==
- International Ring Organization
  - 2012 IRO -95 kg European Muay Thai Championship
- Intercontinental Kickboxing Association
  - 2014 IKA -95 kg World Championship
- World Fighting League
  - 2015 WFL -95 kg World Tournament Championship
- Enfusion
  - 2017 Enfusion Live Light Heavyweight Heavyweight (-95 kg.) Championship
  - 2017 Enfusion Live Heavyweight (+95 kg) Championship

== Kickboxing record ==
Professional kickboxing record
66 wins (22 (T)KOs), 12 losses, 1 no contest
Date	Result	Opponent	Event	Location	Method	Round	Time
2026-06-13	Loss	(Suriname) Donovan Wisse	Glory Collision 9 - Light Heavyweight Grand Prix, Quarterfinals	Rotterdam, Netherlands	Decision (unanimous)	3	3:00
2026-04-25	Win	(Morocco) Mohamed Amine	Glory 107	Rotterdam, Netherlands	Decision (unanimous)	3	3:00
2026-02-07	Loss	(Romania) Alin Nechita	Glory 105	Arnhem, Netherlands	Decision (Split)	3	3:00
2025-12-13	Win	(Morocco) Ismael Lazaar	Glory Collision 8 - Light Heavyweight Tournament, reserve	Arnhem, Netherlands	Decision (unanimous)	3	3:00
2023-10-07	Loss	(Romania) Bogdan Stoica	Glory 89	Burgas, Bulgaria	Decision (unanimous)	3	3:00
2023-05-27	Loss	(Azerbaijan) Bahram Rajabzadeh	Glory 86	Essen, Germany	KO (head kick)	1	1:58
2022-06-11	NC	(France) Florent Kaouachi	Glory Rivals 1	Alkmaar, Netherlands	No contest	3	0:27
Originally a KO win for Tavares, changed to a no contest after he tested positive for a banned substance.
2021-09-04	Win	(Brazil) Felipe Micheletti	Glory 78: Rotterdam	Rotterdam, Netherlands	Decision (unanimous)	3	3:00
Glory Light Heavyweight title eliminator.
2021-01-30	Win	(Suriname) Donegi Abena	Glory 77: Rotterdam	Rotterdam, Netherlands	Decision (unanimous)	3	3:00
2019-12-21	Win	(France) Stéphane Susperregui	Glory Collision 2	Arnhem, Netherlands	Decision (unanimous)	3	3:00
2019-10-12	Win	(Netherlands) Michael Duut	Glory 69: Düsseldorf	Germany	Decision (unanimous)	3	3:00
2019-06-22	Loss	(Brazil) Felipe Micheletti	Glory 66: Paris	Paris, France	Decision (split)	3	3:00
2018-12-08	Win	(Latvia) Artur Gorlov	Glory 62: Rotterdam	Rotterdam, Netherlands	Decision (split)	3	3:00
2018-06-23	Win	(Iran) Kamran Aminzadeh	Enfusion 69	Netherlands	Decision (unanimous)	3	3:00
2018-05-05	Loss	(Suriname) Donegi Abena	A1WCC Champions League Heavyweight Tournament - Quarter finals	Belgium	Ext. R. decision (unanimous)	4	3:00
2018-03-09	Win	(Turkey) Fatih Ulusoy	Enfusion 63	Abu Dhabi	TKO (corner stoppage)	3	
Defended Enfusion Live Super Heavyweight Championship +95 kg.
2017-12-02	Win	(Tunisia) Mrad Akram	Enfusion Live 57	The Hague, Netherlands	KO (spinning back kick)	1	
Defended Enfusion Live Heavyweight Championship -95 kg.
2017-09-30	Win	(Suriname) Jahfarr Wilnis	Enfusion Live 53	Antwerp, Belgium	Decision (unanimous)	5	3:00
Wins Enfusion Live Super Heavyweight Championship +95 kg.
2017-04-29	Win	(Morocco) Mohamed Boubkari	Enfusion Live 49	The Hague, Netherlands	KO	1	
Wins Enfusion Live Heavyweight Championship -95 kg.
2017-03-18	Win	(Armenia) Jegish Yegoian	Enfusion Live 47	Nijmegen, Netherlands	Decision (unanimous)	3	3:00
2016-10-16	Loss	(Belarus) Igor Bugaenko	ACB KB 8: Only The Braves	Hoofddorp, Netherlands	Ext. R. decision	4	3:00
2016-05-14	Win	(Netherlands) Andress van Engelen	Enfusion	Nijmegen, Netherlands	Decision	3	3:00
2016-04-03	Win	(Suriname) Redouan Cairo	WFL - Where Heroes Meet Legends	Hoofddorp, Netherlands	Decision	3	3:00
2015-10-18	Win	(Spain) Lorenzo Javier Jorge	WFL "Unfinished Business", Final	Hoofddorp, Netherlands	Ext. R. decision	3	3:00
For the WFL -95 kg Tournament Title.
2015-10-18	Win	(Netherlands) Fred Sikking	WFL "Unfinished Business", Semi Finals	Hoofddorp, Netherlands	Decision	3	3:00
2015-05-31	Win	(Morocco) Mohammed Boubkari	King of the Ring	Netherlands	TKO		
2015-03-28	Win	(Germany) Andre Langen	Fightersheart III	Arnhem, Netherlands	Doc. stop.		
2014-06-06	Loss	(Croatia) Igor Jurković	FFC13: Jurković vs. Tavares	Zadar, Croatia	Decision (unanimous)	3	3:00
2014-03-08	Win	(Morocco) Hicham Achalhi	Kickboxing Empire II	Las Vegas, Nevada, USA	Decision	5	3:00
Fight was for IKA Heavyweight Championship
2013-10-20	Win	(Greece) Antonis Tzoros	The Battle VII	Greece	Ext. R. TKO	4	
2013-06-22	Loss	(Russia) Artem Vakhitov	Glory 9: New York	New York City, New York, USA	KO (left hook to the body)	1	1:06
2012-12-08	Win	(Netherlands) Rodney Glunder	Kickboks Gala Margriethal	Schiedam, Netherlands	KO	4	
Fight was for IRO European Muay Thai Championship
2012-09-02	Loss	(Netherlands) Jason Wilnis	Muay Thai Mania V	The Hague, Netherlands	Decision	3	3:00
2012-05-26	Loss	(Morocco) Ismael Lazaar	Fight Explosion	Oud-Beijerland, Netherlands	Decision	3	3:00
Legend: Win Loss Draw/no contest Notes

== See also ==
- List of male kickboxers
