= Felipe Micheletti =

Brazilian professional kickboxer (born 1990)

- Born: Felipe Stievano Micheletti; May 24, 1990 (age 36); Sorocaba, São Paulo, Brazil
- Height: 6 ft 4 1/2 in (194 cm)
- Weight: 231 lb (105 kg; 16 st 7 lb)
- Division: Cruiserweight
- Reach: 76.7 in (195 cm)
- Style: Kickboxing
- Team: Carseti Fight Team
- Trainer: Adriano Carseti & Túlio Corrá
- Years active: 2011–present

Kickboxing record
- Total: 28
- Wins: 17
- By knockout: 6
- Losses: 11
- By knockout: 1

Mixed martial arts record
- Total: 3
- Wins: 3
- By knockout: 2
- By decision: 1
- Losses: 0

Other information
- University: Faculty of Physical Education of Sorocaba (FEFISO)
- Spouse: Talita Branco
- Children: 3
- Boxing record from BoxRec

Felipe Stievano Micheletti (born May 24, 1990) is a Brazilian professional kickboxer and mixed martial artist.

He was ranked as the sixth best light heavyweight in the world by Combat Press as of September 2022, and fourth best by Beyond Kick as of October 2022. He has been continually ranked in the Combat Press Light Heavyweight top ten since November 2018.

== Kickboxing career ==
=== Early career ===
Micheletti participated in 37 amateur fights with 30 wins, including 15 wins by knockout. In 2009, he became Brazilian champion through the Brazilian Confederation of Kickboxing in the K-1 style, super-heavy category. He has also been a Septa Brazilian champion and the World Association of Kickboxing Organizations (WAKO) Pan American kickboxing champion, World Champion, and two-time Vice-World Champion.

==== Superkombat ====
Micheletti debuted in November 2009 as a professional against Edson Lima at KO Fight in Apucarana, and soon afterwards was invited to fight Cleber Rodrigues.

After a mixed start to his professional career, including a loss to Alex Pereira, Micheletti took part in the WGP Supekombat Heavyweight Tournament. In the semifinals, he defeated Rogélio Ortiz by a second round liver kick KO. In the tournament finals he faced Edson Lima, whom he defeated by a split decision.

Micheletti fought Saulo Cavalari for the WGP Brazilian Light Heavyweight title at WGP 14 on July 27, 2013. Cavalari won the fight by a fifth-round technical knockout.

On December 21, 2013, Micheletti fought Francisco Lefevbre during the WGP Final Tour event. He beat Lefevbre in the first round, by knockout. Micheletti was booked to face the WKN and WAKO champion Vladimir Mineev at WGP Kickboxing: Russia X Brasil on May 17, 2014, and lost a unanimous decision.

Micheletti fought Wallyson Maguila for the Brazilian Professional Kickboxing Light Heavyweight title at WGP 22 on September 27, 2014. He won the fight by technical knockout. He also won a unanimous decision against Toni Milanovic at WGP 24 on December 20, 2014, and faced Guto Inocente for the WGP light heavyweight (-84 kg) championship. Innocente won the fight by unanimous decision.

Micheletti faced Carlos Meza for the WGP Light Heavyweight title on July 2, 2016. He won the fight by unanimous decision. In his next fight, Micheletti fought for the WKN K-1 Super Cruiserweight title, facing Rogélio Ortiz at IVC International Vale Tudo championship on August 20, 2016. He knocked Ortiz out in the first round.

==== Kunlun Fight ====
Micheletti made his Kunlun Fight debut at Kunlun Fight 56 on January 2, 2017, against Andrey Gerasimchuk. Gerasimchuk won the bout by unanimous decision.

Micheletti successfully defended the WGP Heavyweight title with a unanimous decision win over Haime Morais at WGP 37 on May 20, 2017.

He afterwards participated in the Kunlun Fight Heavyweight tournament. In the quarterfinals, Micheletti beat Liu Junchao by technical knockout, but lost to Roman Kryklia by unanimous decision in the semifinals.

A month after his loss to Kryklia, Micheletti facedIgor Darmeshkin, for the vacant WAKO Pro World Low Kick Light Heavyweight title, at Battle of Champions 10 on March 16, 2018. He won the fight by unanimous decision.

Micheletti defended his WGP heavyweight title for the second time with a decision win over Ivan Galaz at WGP 45 on May 5, 2018.

=== GLORY ===
Felipe Micheletti made his Glory debut at Glory 60: Lyon on October 20, 2018, when he was scheduled to fight Zinedine Hameur-Lain. He won the fight by technical knockout, after Hameur-Lain was forced to retire at the end of the first round due to injury.

He was next booked to fight Luis Tavares at Glory 66: Paris on June 22, 2019, as a short notice replacement for Stephane Susperregui. He won the fight by a split decision.

Micheletti faced Stéphane Susperregui at Glory 69: Düsseldorf on October 12, 2019. Despite being knocked down early in the fight, Susperregui managed to take the fight into an extra round, after which he won a decision.

Micheletti was scheduled to fight a rematch with Luis Tavares at Glory 78: Rotterdam, on a month's notice, as a replacement for Sergej Maslobojev. He lost the fight by unanimous decision.

Micheletti faced the #5 ranked Glory light heavyweight contender Donegi Abena at Glory: Collision 4 on October 8, 2022.

Micheletti faced Nordine Mahieddine at Glory 84 on March 11, 2023. He won the fight by unanimous decision, after twice knocking Mahieddine down.

Micheletti faced the 2017 K-1 Heavyweight Grand Prix runner-up Ibrahim El Bouni at Glory: Collision 5 on June 17, 2023.

== Championships and accomplishments ==
=== Professional ===
==== Kickboxing ====
- WGP Kickboxing
  - 2016 WGP Kickboxing Heavyweight (-94.1 kg) Champion
    - Two successful title defenses
- World Association of Kickboxing Organizations
  - 2018 WAKO Pro World Low Kick -94.2 kg Champion
  - 2014 WAKO Pro Brazil Low kick -94.2 kg Champion
    - One successful title defense
- World Kickboxing Network
  - 2016 WKN World Super Cruiserweight (-92.5 kg) K-1 Champion
- SUPERKOMBAT Fighting Championship
  - 2013 SUPERKOMBAT New Heroes Heavyweight Tournament Winner

=== Amateur ===
==== Kickboxing ====
- World Association of Kickboxing Organizations
  - 2015 WAKO World Championships K-1 +91 kg (silver)

==== Boxing ====
- Copa Lisoboxe – gold
- Brasil Ceintures – gold
- Kid Jofre – gold
- Forja dos Campeões – silver

== Mixed martial arts record ==
Professional record breakdown
3 matches	3 wins	0 losses
By knockout	2	0
By decision	1	0

Res.	Record	Opponent	Method	Event	Date	Round	Time	Location	Notes
Win	3–0	Fabricio Almeida	Decision (split)	Hyper Fight 2	28 September 2024	3	5:00	São Bernardo do Campo, Brazil	Heavyweight debut.
Win	2–0	Alisson Nascimento	TKO (punches)	Dragon Fight 6	13 July 2024	1	2:44	Votuporanga, Brazil	
Win	1–0	Manoel Vitor Santos	KO (punch to the body)	Fight Pro 2	13 August 2022	1	2:20	Bragança Paulista, Brazil	Light Heavyweight debut.

== Kickboxing record ==
Professional kickboxing record
17 Wins (6 KOs), 11 Losses
Date	Result	Opponent	Event	Location	Method	Round	Time
2023-06-17	Loss	(Morocco) Ibrahim El Bouni	Glory: Collision 5	Rotterdam, Netherlands	Decision (Unanimous)	3	3:00
2023-03-11	Win	(Algeria) Nordine Mahieddine	Glory 84	Rotterdam, Netherlands	Decision (Unanimous)	3	3:00
2022-10-08	Loss	(Suriname) Donegi Abena	Glory: Collision 4	Arnhem, Netherlands	Decision (Unanimous)	3	3:00
2021-09-04	Loss	(Netherlands) Luis Tavares	Glory 78: Rotterdam	Rotterdam, Netherlands	Decision (Unanimous)	3	3:00
Glory Light Heavyweight Title eliminator.
2019-10-12	Loss	(France) Stéphane Susperregui	Glory 69: Düsseldorf	Düsseldorf, Germany	Ext.R Decision (Unanimous)	4	3:00
2019-06-22	Win	(Netherlands) Luis Tavares	Glory 66: Paris	Paris, France	Decision (Split)	3	3:00
2018-10-20	Win	(France) Zinedine Hameur-Lain	Glory 60: Lyon	Lyon, France	TKO (Retirement)	1	3:00
2018-05-05	Win	(Chile) Ivan Galaz	WGP Kickboxing 45	São Paulo, Brazil	Decision (Unanimous)	5	3:00
Retains the WGP Kickboxing Heavyweight (94.1 kg) Championship.
2018-03-16	Win	(Russia) Igor Darmeshkin	Battle of Champions 10	Moscow, Russia	Decision	5	3:00
Wins vacant WAKO Pro World Low Kick Championship -94.2 kg
2018-02-04	Loss	(Ukraine) Roman Kryklia	Kunlun Fight 69 Heavyweight Tournament, Semi Finals	Guiyang, China	Decision (Unanimous)	3	
2017-12-17	Win	(China) Liu Junchao	Kunlun Fight 68 Heavyweight Tournament, Quarter Finals	Guiyang, China	TKO		
2017-05-20	Win	(Brazil) Haime Morais	WGP Kickboxing 37	Sorocaba, São Paulo	Decision (unanimous)	5	3:00
Retains the WGP Kickboxing Heavyweight (94.1 kg) Championship.
2017-01-02	Loss	(Belarus) Andrey Gerasimchuk	Kunlun Fight 56	Sanya, Hainan, China	Decision (unanimous)	3	3:00
2016-08-20	Win	(Argentina) Rogélio Ortiz	IVC International Vale Tudo championship	Brazil	KO	1	1:45
Wins WKN World K-1 Super Cruiserweight (-92.5 kg) Championship.
2016-07-02	Win	(Paraguay) Carlos Meza	WGP Kickboxing 31	Brazil	Decision	5	3:00
Wins the vacant WGP Kickboxing Heavyweight (94.1 kg) Championship.
2016-05-07	Win	(Brazil) Haime Morais	WGP Kickboxing 3.0 – Special Edition	Brazil	Decision (unanimous)	3	3:00
2015-09-05	Loss	(Brazil) Guto Inocente	WGP Kickboxing 26	Guarapuava, Brazil	Decision (unanimous)	5	3:00
For the WGP world light heavyweight championship under 185 pounds.
2015-06-20	Win	(Brazil) Fábio Alberto Cordovil	Jungle Fight 78	São Paulo, Brazil	Decision (unanimous)	5	3:00
Retains WAKO Pro Low Kick Brazil -94 kg Championship.
2014-12-20	Win	(Croatia) Toni Milanovic	WGP Kickboxing 24	São Paulo, Brazil	Decision (unanimous)	3	3:00
2014-09-27	Win	(Brazil) Wallyson Maguila	WGP Kickboxing 22	São Paulo, Brazil	TKO		
Wins WAKO Pro Low Kick Brazil -94 kg Championship.
2014-05-17	Loss	(Russia) Vladimir Mineev	WGP Kickboxing: Russia X Brasil	São Paulo, Brazil	Decision (unanimous)	3	3:00
2013-12-21	Win	(Paraguay) Francisco Lefevbre	WGP Kickboxing Final Tour	Brazil	KO	1	
2013-07-27	Loss	(Brazil) Saulo Cavalari	WGP Kickboxing 14	São Paulo, Brazil	TKO	5	
For The WGP Kickboxing Brazil -94.1 kg championship.
2013-03-23	Win	(Brazil) Edson Lima	WGP Kickboxing 12 x SUPERKOMBAT New Heroes 2	São Caetano, Brazil	Decision (split)	3	3:00
Wins WGP Supekombat Heavyweight Tournament.
2013-03-23	Win	(Argentina) Rogélio Ortiz	WGP Kickboxing 12 x SUPERKOMBAT New Heroes 2	São Caetano, Brazil	KO (liver kick)	2	
2012-09-16	Loss	(Brazil) Alex Pereira	WGP Kickboxing 9	São Paulo, Brazil	Decision (unanimous)	3	
2012-06-02	Win	(Brazil) Cleber Rodrigues	WGP Kickboxing 8	Brazil	Decision	3	3:00
2011-11-12	Loss	(Brazil) Edson Lima	K.O Fight – Apucarana	Brazil	Decision (unanimous)	3	3:00
Legend: Win Loss Draw/No contest Notes

Amateur Kickboxing Record
Date	Result	Opponent	Event	Location	Method	Round	Time
2015-10-31	Loss	(Serbia) Sasa Polugic	W.A.K.O World Championships 2015, Final	Belgrade, Serbia	Decision	3	2:00
Wins 2015 WAKO World Championships K-1 +91kg Silver medal.
2015-10-30	Win	(Russia) Vladimir Oleinik	W.A.K.O World Championships 2015, Semifinals	Belgrade, Serbia	Decision (Unanimous)	3	2:00
2015-10-29	Win	(Romania) Mihai Cirstea	W.A.K.O World Championships 2015, Quarterfinals	Belgrade, Serbia	Decision (Unanimous)	3	2:00
2015-10-28	Win	(United States) Antonio Dvora	W.A.K.O World Championships 2015, First Round	Belgrade, Serbia	Decision (Unanimous)	3	2:00
Legend: Win Loss Draw/No contest Notes

== See also ==
- List of male kickboxers
