= 2021 in Glory =

Kickboxing events

Information
- First date: January 30
- Last date: October 23

Events
- Total events: 3

Fights
- Total fights: 29
- Title fights: 7

The year 2021 was the tenth year in the history of Glory, an international kickboxing promotion. Glory 77: Rotterdam was available on Pay-per-view through Glory and official distribution partnerships with FITE TV, Spike Netherlands, Sport Extra and La Sueur. Later events were streamed on the Glory Fights Pay-per-view platform.

== Glory 2021 Awards ==
The following fighters won the GLORY Kickboxing year-end awards for 2021:

- Glory Fighter of the Year 2021: Rico Verhoeven
- Glory Fight of the Year 2021: Rico Verhoeven vs. Jamal Ben Saddik (Glory: Collision 3)
- Glory Knockout of the Year 2021: Arkadiusz Wrzosek vs. Badr Hari (Glory 78)
- Glory Newcomer of the Year 2021: Serkan Ozcaglayan
- Glory Most Improved Fighter of the Year 2021: Antonio Plazibat

== List of events ==
#	Event Title	Date	Arena	Location
1	Glory 77: Rotterdam	January 30, 2021	Rotterdam Ahoy	Rotterdam, Netherlands
2	Glory 78: Rotterdam	September 4, 2021	Rotterdam Ahoy	Rotterdam, Netherlands
3	Glory: Collision 3	October 23, 2021	GelreDome	Arnhem, Netherlands

== Glory 77: Rotterdam ==
Glory 77: Rotterdam
- Promotion: Glory
- Date: January 30, 2021
- Venue: Rotterdam Ahoy
- City: Rotterdam, Netherlands
- Attendance: None (behind closed doors)

Event chronology
Glory 76: Rotterdam	Glory 77: Rotterdam	Glory 78: Rotterdam

Glory 77: Rotterdam was a kickboxing event held by Glory on January 30, 2021 at the Rotterdam Ahoy in Rotterdam, Netherlands.

=== Background ===
The main event was initially set to feature the Glory Heavyweight champion Rico Verhoeven who was supposed to defend his Glory Heavyweight Championship against his longtime foe Jamal Ben Saddik in a trilogy bout, but Ben Saddik was forced off the card on January 19 due to a back injury. Instead, the event will be headlined by a 4-man heavyweight tournament. Rico Verhoeven will face Hesdy Gerges in the first semi-final of the tournament and Glory newcomer Tarik Khbabez will square off with Levi Rigters in the second semi-final of the tournament. Rigters stepped in on short notice to face Khbabez who was set to make his GLORY debut against Antonio Plazibat. However, Plazibat pulled out two weeks before the event due to an injury sustained during his camp.

The co-main event of the evening featured the Glory light heavyweight champion Artem Vakhitov against the Glory middleweight champion and the interim Glory light heavyweight champion Alex Pereira for the undisputed Glory Light Heavyweight Championship.

Cédric Doumbé fought Murthel Groenhart in a trilogy bout to unify the Glory Welterweight Championship. Groenhart was previously scheduled to face Cedric Doumbe to unify the title at glory 76, but Groenhart was forced off the card with an injury.

The Glory Super Bantamweight champion Tiffany van Soest made her first title defense, of her second title reign, against the #2 ranked Glory super bantamweight Aline Pereira.

In the second light heavyweight bout of the card, the #2 ranked Luis Tavares was scheduled to fight the #4 ranked Donegi Abena.

Former K-1 fighter Raul Cătinaș was expected to make his GLORY debut against Martin Pacas in a heavyweight bout. However, Cătinaș pulled out on January 13 due to testing positive for COVID-19. Promotional newcomer Muhammed Balli stepped in to fight Pacas on just two weeks notice.

A lightweight bout between Itay Gershon and Guerric Billet was scheduled for the preliminary card. However, Gershon was unable to compete due to COVID-19 travel restrictions in Israel, the bout was cancelled .

=== Results ===
Glory 77
Weight Class				Method	Round	Time	Notes
Heavyweight 120 kg	(Netherlands) Rico Verhoeven	def.	(Morocco) Tarik Khbabez	TKO (Retirement)	1	3:00	Heavyweight Tournament Final
Light Heavyweight 95 kg	(Brazil) Alex Pereira (ic)	def.	(Russia) Artem Vakhitov (c)	Decision (Split)	5	3:00	For the undisputed Glory Light Heavyweight Championship
Welterweight 77 kg	(France) Cédric Doumbé (c)	def.	(Suriname) Murthel Groenhart (ic)	KO (Punch)	2	2:52	For the undisputed Glory Welterweight Championship
Heavyweight 120 kg	(Morocco) Tarik Khbabez	def.	(Netherlands) Levi Rigters	Decision (Majority)	3	3:00	Heavyweight Tournament Semi-Finals B
Heavyweight 120 kg	(Netherlands) Rico Verhoeven	def.	(Netherlands) Hesdy Gerges	Decision (Unanimous)	3	3:00	Heavyweight Tournament Semi-Finals A
Super Bantamweight 55 kg	(United States) Tiffany van Soest (c)	def.	(Brazil) Aline Pereira	Decision (Unanimous)	5	3:00	For the Glory Super Bantamweight Championship
Light Heavyweight 95 kg	(Cape Verde) Luis Tavares	def.	(Suriname) Donegi Abena	Decision (Unanimous)	3	3:00	
Preliminary card
Heavyweight 120 kg	(Slovakia) Martin Pacas	def.	(Netherlands) Muhammed Balli	KO (Head Kick and Punches)	3	2:23	Heavyweight Tournament Reserve Fight

=== 2021 Glory Heavyweight Tournament bracket ===
Semi-finals
(Netherlands) Rico Verhoeven	UD
(Netherlands) Hesdy Gerges	3r.
(Morocco) Tarik Khbabez	MD
(Netherlands) Levi Rigters	3r.

Final
(Netherlands) Rico Verhoeven	TKO
(Morocco) Tarik Khbabez	1r.

== Glory 78: Rotterdam ==
Glory 78: Rotterdam
- Promotion: Glory
- Date: September 4, 2021
- Venue: Rotterdam Ahoy
- City: Rotterdam, Netherlands

Glory 78: Rotterdam was a kickboxing event held by Glory on September 4, 2021 at the Rotterdam Ahoy in Rotterdam, Netherlands.

=== Background ===
The main event saw former It's Showtime and K-1 Heavyweight champion Badr Hari in a three-round heavyweight bout against Arkadiusz Wrzosek.

Alex Pereira made his first title defense in a rematch with Artem Vakhitov, following their close fight at Glory 77.

The #1 ranked middleweight Donovan Wisse and the #2 ranked middleweight Yousri Belgaroui fought for the vacant Glory Middleweight Championship.

A lightweight bout between the #2 ranked Tyjani Beztati and the #3 ranked Elvis Gashi served to crown the new Glory Lightweight champion.

Two ranked heavyweights, Antonio Plazibat and Tarik Khbabez, fought at the event. The pair was originally scheduled to fight at GLORY 77, before Plazibat withdrew due to injuries sustained in training.

Former Enfusion heavyweight champion Levi Rigters is faced the #10 ranked Glory heavyweight Tomáš Možný.

Former K-1 fighter Raul Cătinaș made his GLORY debut against the #6 ranked Glory heavyweight Nordine Mahieddine in a heavyweight bout. Cătinaș returned to kickboxing after a 5-year hiatus.

The #2 ranked light heavyweight Luis Tavares was scheduled to fight Sergej Maslobojev. A month before the bout, Maslobojev withdrew due to injury and was replaced by Felipe Micheletti.

It was announced that the #2 ranked welterweight Dmitry Menshikov would fight the #1 ranked Mohamed Mezouari. Menshikov later withdrew from the bout and was replaced by Vedat Hoduk.

Itay Gershon fought Guerric Billet.

=== Results ===
Glory 78
Weight Class				Method	Round	Time	Notes
Heavyweight 120 kg	(Poland) Arkadiusz Wrzosek	def.	(Morocco) Badr Hari	KO (Head Kick)	2	1:30	
Light Heavyweight 95 kg	(Russia) Artem Vakhitov	def.	(Brazil) Alex Pereira (c)	Decision (Majority)	5	3:00	For the Glory Light Heavyweight Championship
Heavyweight 120 kg	(Croatia) Antonio Plazibat	def.	(Morocco) Tarik Khbabez	KO (Punches)	2	2:14	
Heavyweight 120 kg	(Netherlands) Levi Rigters	def.	(Slovakia) Tomáš Možný	TKO (4 Knckdowns Rule)	3	1:02	
Light Heavyweight 95 kg	(Netherlands) Luis Tavares	def.	(Brazil) Felipe Micheletti	Decision (Unanimous)	3	3:00	
Heavyweight 120 kg	(France) Nordine Mahieddine	def.	(Romania) Raul Cătinaș	Decision (Unanimous)	3	3:00	
Welterweight 77 kg	(Morocco) Hamicha	def.	(Turkey) Vedat Hoduk	TKO (Punch to the Body)	1	1:20	
Superfight Series
Middleweight 84 kg	(Suriname) Donovan Wisse	def.	(Tunisia) Yousri Belgaroui	TKO (Doctor Stoppage)	3	2:10	For the vacant Glory Middleweight Championship
Lightweight 70 kg	(Morocco) Tyjani Beztati	def.	(United States) Elvis Gashi	Decision (Unanimous)	5	3:00	For the vacant Glory Lightweight Championship
Lightweight 70 kg	(Israel) Itay Gershon	-	(France) Guerric Billet	Draw (Split)	3	3:00	
Lightweight 70 kg	(Morocco) Mohammed Hendouf	def.	(Brazil) Robson Minoto	TKO (Punch to the Body)	3	1:30	

== Glory: Collision 3 ==
Glory: Collision 3
- Promotion: Glory
- Date: October 23, 2021
- Venue: GelreDome
- City: Arnhem, Netherlands

Glory: Collision 3 was an kickboxing event held by Glory on October 23, 2021 at the GelreDome in Arnhem, Netherlands.

=== Background ===
A Glory Heavyweight Championship bout between the current champion Rico Verhoeven and promotional newcomer Alistair Overeem (2010 K-1 World Grand Prix Champion) was scheduled as the event headliner. However, Overeem later withdrew due to injuries.

Instead the promotion booked the trilogy fight between Verhoeven and Jamal Ben Saddik. The latter was set to make his comeback against the mandatory challenger for the Glory Heavyweight Championship Benjamin Adegbuyi, who got a new opponent Antonio Plazibat. Plazibat was booked against James McSweeney, who also received a new opponent - Gokhan Saki, who makes his return to kickboxing.

Two fights were added on September 9: a welterweight bout between Alim Nabiev and Troy Jones, as well as a light heavyweight bout between Sergej Maslobojev and Donegi Abena.

Three more fights were added to the card on September 11: a lightweight bout between Stoyan Koprivlenski and Bruno Gazani, a middleweight bout between Ertuğrul Bayrak and Matěj Peňáz, as well as a light heavyweight bout between Michael Duut and John King.

Mohamed Mezouari was scheduled to face Eyevan Danenberg in a welterweight bout. Danenberg returned to kickboxing, following a two-year absence from the sport. Danenberg later withdrew from the bout and was replaced by Maximo Suarez. Suarez later withdrew from the bout as well, and was replaced by Samo Dbili.

=== Results ===
Glory: Collision 3
Weight Class				Method	Round	Time	Notes
Heavyweight 120 kg	(Netherlands) Rico Verhoeven (c)	def.	(Morocco) Jamal Ben Saddik	TKO (Punches)	4	0:56	For the Glory Heavyweight Championship
Heavyweight 120 kg	(Turkey) Gökhan Saki	def.	(England) James McSweeney	KO (Leg Kicks)	2	2:13	
Welterweight 77 kg	(Morocco) Hamicha	def.	(France) Samuel Dbili	TKO (3 Knockdows Rule)	1	2:27	
Light Heavyweight 95 kg	(Lithuania) Sergej Maslobojev	def.	(Suriname) Donegi Abena	Decision (Split)	3	3:00	
Heavyweight 120 kg	(Croatia) Antonio Plazibat	def.	(Romania) Benjamin Adegbuyi	KO (Punches)	2	0:24	
Light Heavyweight 95 kg	(Netherlands) Michael Duut	def.	(United States) John King	TKO (Knee to the Body)	2	1:07	
Glory 79
Welterweight 77 kg	(Azerbaijan) Alim Nabiev	def.	(United States) Troy Jones	Decision (Unanimous)	3	3:00	
Featherweight 65 kg	(Russia) Aleksei Ulianov	def.	(Ukraine) Serhiy Adamchuk	Decision (Split)	3	3:00	
Middleweight 85 kg	(Turkey) Serkan Ozcaglayan	def.	(United States) Matt Baker	TKO (Punches)	1	0:58	
Lightweight 70 kg	(Bulgaria) Stoyan Koprivlenski	def.	(Brazil) Bruno Gazani	Decision (Unanimous)	3	3:00	

== See also ==
- 2021 in K-1
- 2021 in ONE Championship
- 2021 in Romanian kickboxing
- 2021 in Wu Lin Feng
