= Antonio Plazibat =

Croatian kickboxer

- Born: 12 December 1993 (age 32); Split, Croatia
- Years active: 2013–present
- Martial arts career
- Height: 1.94 m (6 ft 4 1/2 in)
- Weight: 123.8 kg (273 lb; 19 st 7 lb)
- Division: Heavyweight
- Reach: 196 cm (77 in)
- Style: Kickboxing
- Stance: Orthodox
- Fighting out of: Amsterdam, Netherlands
- Team: Ameno Gym (2013–2018); Mike's Gym (2019–present)
- Trainer: Mike Passenier

Kickboxing record
- Total: 29
- Wins: 24
- By knockout: 14
- Losses: 5
- By knockout: 2

Other information
- Children: 1
- Notable relatives: Luciano Plazibat (brother)
- Boxing record from BoxRec

YouTube information
- Channel: Antonio Plazibat
- Years active: 2010–present
- Genre: Vlog
- Subscribers: 44.5 thousand
- Views: 5.16 million
- Last updated: 14 July 2022

Antonio Plazibat (born 12 December 1993) is a Croatian professional kickboxer, who currently competes in the Heavyweight division of Glory. Plazibat is a former K-1 Heavyweight Champion.

At the amateur level, Plazibat captured medals at both the WAKO world and continental tournaments, as he won the silver medal at the 2015 WAKO World Championships and the gold medal at the 2018 European Championships.

As of December 2024, he is ranked as the 5th best heavyweight kickboxer in the world by Combat Press. Combat Press has ranked him as a top 10 heavyweight continually since August 2021.

== Amateur career ==
Antonio Plazibat began his kickboxing career as an amateur, training with Ameno Gym. His first fight was against Dražen Kuraja in the semifinal bout of the 2013 Croatian Kickboxing Championship 91 kg tournament. Despite being the underdog, Plazibat knocked Kuraja down twice, and would go on to win a unanimous decision. In the finals he faced Andrija Lekić. Despite fighting with a broken hand, he managed to knock him down once, and won a unanimous decision.

He would again fight in the Croatian Kickboxing Championship, when he entered their 2014 91 kg tournament. Despite beginning with two wins, he lost to Andrija Lekić in the semifinals. In the 2015 edition of the 91 kg Croatian Kickboxing Championship tournament, he would make it to the finals, to once again face Andrija Lekić. He would seal the trilogy with a win, becoming the 2015 91 kg tournament champion.

Plazibat fought in the 2015 W.A.K.O World Championship. He won his first three fights, but lost to Basir Abakarov in the finals, securing a second-place finish. He won the Croatian Kickboxing Championship tournament for the second time in 2016, beating Anto Širić by unanimous decision.

His last feature in an amateur tournament was in 2018 edition of the W.A.K.O European Championships. He would go a perfect 3–0, to win his last amateur title.

== Professional career ==
=== Early career ===
Plazibat made his professional debut in August 2013, during Oluja u Ringu 5, against Marko Vidović. He won the fight by a third round head kick. Plazibat notched two more victories on the regional circuit, winning decisions against Simon Krizmanić and Franci Grajš.

Plazibat then signed a contract with Final Fight Championship. He was immediately placed in the FFC Futures Kickboxing Light Heavyweight tournament. In the semifinals, Plazibat defeated Stipe Stipetić by a second-round TKO, and in the finals, he defeated Mitar Dugalić by a third-round TKO.

Plazibat notched two more wins with the organization, defeating Bojan Džepina and Daniel Škvor by knockout. His winning streak earned Plazibat his highest profile fight of his career up to that point, as he was scheduled to fight Sergej Maslobojev at FFC 22: Athens. Maslobojev won the fight by a second-round TKO, after the ringside doctor waved the fight off due to a cut.

=== SUPERKOMBAT Fighting Championship ===
Plazibat was scheduled to face the former SUPERKOMBAT cruiserweight champion Bogdan Stoica at Respect World Series 2 on July 2, 2016. Plazibat won the fight by a second-round technical knockout. Stoica fell down several times in the second round, as he seemed unable to put weight on his leg, prompting the referee to stop the fight due to injury.

Plazibat made his SUPEROMBAT debut against Dănuț Hurduc at SUPERKOMBAT World Grand Prix IV 2016 on August 6, 2016. Plazibat won the fight by unanimous decision, scoring a knockdown in the second round.

Plazibat was scheduled to face Frank Muñoz at W5 European League XXXVI on September 10, 2016. He won the fight by unanimous decision.

=== K-1 ===
==== K-1 Heavyweight champion ====
Plazibat participated in the 2017 K-1 Heavyweight World Grand Prix, which was held at K-1 World GP 2017 Japan Heavyweight Championship Tournament on November 23, 2017. To better prepare for the tournament, Plazibat added the 1993 K-1 World Grand Prix winner Branko Cikatić to his training staff. He was scheduled to face K-Jee in the tournament quarterfinals. Plazibat scored an early knockdown on K-Jee, as he dropped him with a left hook. Although he was able to beat the eight count, K-Jee was soon after dropped once again with a hook to the body, from which he was unable to recover in time. Plazibat advanced to the semifinals, where he faced the former RISE Heavyweight and Light Heavyweight champion Makoto Uehara. He made quick work of Uehara, flooring him with a flying knee at the 2:09 minute mark of the first round. Plazibat faced Ibrahim El Bouni in the tournament finals. He beat him by unanimous decision.

Plazibat was scheduled to make his first K-1 title defense against Roel Mannaart at K-1 World GP 2018: K'FESTA.1 on March 21, 2018. He lost the fight by unanimous decision.

=== ONE Championship ===
After losing in his first K-1 title defense, Plazibat signed with the Singaporean-based promotion ONE Championship. He was scheduled to make his promotional debut against Sergej Maslobojev at ONE Championship: Grit and Glory on May 12, 2018. The fight was a rematch of their February 19, 2016, meeting, when Maslobojev handed Plazibat his first professional loss. Maslobojev won the fight by unanimous decision.

Plazibat was scheduled to face Michal Turynski for the WAKO Pro World Super Cruiserweight Low Kick title at Memorijal Ludviga Lutka Pavlovica on November 24, 2018. Plazibat won the fight by a third-round knockout.

=== GLORY ===
==== 2019 ====
Plazibat subsequently left Ameno Gym and joined Mike's Gym. In early 2019, Plazibat signed with the Netherlands-based promotion Glory. He was scheduled to face the 36-fight veteran and former WAKO European champion Nordine Mahieddine is his debut at Glory 66: Paris on June 22, 2019. Mahieddine was originally set to face Tomas Mozny, before Mozny withdrew from the bout with an injury. Plazibat won the fight by unanimous decision. He had a slow start to the fight, as all five judges scored the fight for Mahieddine, but rebounded to win the second and third rounds. He was awarded a 29-28 scorecard by all five of the judges.

For his second fight with the promotion, Plazibat was scheduled to face Tomáš Možný at Glory 69: Düsseldorf on October 12, 2019. He won the fight by unanimous decision. Plazibat once again had a slow start, dropping the first round on all five of the judges scorecards. He upped the pace as the fight resumed, and forced a standing count from Mozny 60 seconds into the second round. This was quickly followed up with a second knockdown, which earned Plazibat a 10-7 scorecard for the round. Plazibat was able to knock Mozny one additional time with a right straight at the 1:15 minute mark of the second round. Although he was unable to finish his opponent, Plazibat was awarded a 29–25 score by all five judges.

Plazibat was next scheduled to face the #4 ranked Glory heavyweight, and former Enfusion light heavyweight champion, Jahfarr Wilnis. The fight between the two was announced for Glory Collision 2 on December 21, 2019. Plazibat won the fight by split decision, in front of a 20 000 people audience in a sold out GelreDome. Four of the judges scored the fight 29-28 for Plazibat, while the fifth judge awarded Wilnis a 29-28 scorecard. Plazibat threw a grand total of 250 strikes during the nine minute bout. Following this victory, Plazibat achieved the #5 ranking in the official Glory heavyweight rankings.

==== 2020 ====
Plazibat was scheduled to face the former Enfusion Heavyweight champion Levi Rigters in the quarterfinals of a four-man heavyweight tournament, which was set to be held at Glory 76: Rotterdam on November 7, 2020. On October 7, 2020, the semifinal pairings were altered. Plazibat was rescheduled to face Nordine Mahieddine, while Rigters was rescheduled to face Jahfarr Wilnis. The entire event was later postponed when Badr Hari, who was scheduled to fight in the main event, contracted COVID-19. The event was rescheduled for December 19, 2020. Plazibat lost the semi-finals bout by split decision, after an extra round was fought. He was knocked down in the first round, but managed to win the second and third rounds, which prompted an extra round. Mahieddine appeared to have done more in the additional round, and was awarded the split decision.

==== 2021 ====
After his first loss in Glory, Plazibat was scheduled to fight the promotional newcomer Tarik Khbabez at Glory 77 on January 30, 2021. Plazibat later stated that he was offered the Khbabez fight by Glory, but refused the fight due to right hand injuries. He was rescheduled to fight Tarik Khbabez at Glory 78: Rotterdam on September 4, 2021. He won the fight by a second-round knockout. The knockout itself was preceded by a left hook knockdown, early on in the second round.

Plazibat was scheduled to face promotional newcomer James McSweeney at Glory: Collision 3 on October 23, 2021. It was McSweeny's first kickboxing bout in over two years, with his last being a technical knockout loss to Ismael Londt on December 7, 2019. On October 8, Glory rescheduled a number of heavyweight bouts due to Overeem's withdrawal from the event. Accordingly, Plazibat was rescheduled to face the #2 ranked Glory heavyweight Benjamin Adegbuyi. Plazibat won the fight by knockout, 24 seconds into the second round. He knocked Adegbuyi down with two consecutive right straights, which first forced his opponent to grab onto the ropes, before dropping to the canvas. Although Adegbuyi was able to stand up in time for the eight count, he was unsteady on his feet which prompted the referee to stop the bout.

==== 2022 ====
Plazibat is scheduled to face Tarik Khbabez at Glory 80 Studio on May 14, 2022. The fight will be a rematch of their September 4, 2021 bout, which Plazibat won by a second-round knockout. Plazibat won the fight by a third-round knockout, stopping his opponent with a flurry of punches at the 0:52 minute mark. He appeared to have injured his knee in the second round, as he fell several times, and revealed in a later interview that he had suffered a partial ligament tear.

On July 7, 2022, it was revealed that Plazibat would face the winner of the Benjamin Adegbuyi versus Jamal Ben Saddik heavyweight bout, which was held at Glory 81, for the interim Glory Heavyweight Championship. On September 1, Glory revealed that the bout would not take place, as Plazibat and Ben Saddik refused to face each other.

Plazibat is scheduled to face the #10 ranked Glory heavyweight and former two-time K-1 World Grand Prix finalist Raul Cătinaș in the main event of Glory 82 on November 19, 2022. Plazibat needed just 100 seconds to stop his opponent, staggering Cătinaș with a right hook and finishing him with a flurry of punches.

==== 2023 ====
During a Glory press-conference held on January 12, 2023, it was confirmed by Glory that Plazibat was expected to challenge Rico Verhoeven for the Glory Heavyweight Championship. Although the fight was initially planned to take place in spring, it was postponed as Verhoeven suffered a knee injury in training. Plazibat instead faced Kevin Tariq Osaro, winner of the Glory Four-Man Heavyweight Tournament, for the interim Glory Heavyweight Championship at Glory: Collision 5 on June 17, 2023. He lost the fight by a fifth-round technical knockout. Plazibat broke his left arm in the first round of the fight and underwent surgery post-fight.

==== 2024 ====
On December 22, 2023, it was announced that Plazibat would make a wildcard entry into the 2024 Glory Heavyweight Grand Prix. Plazibat officially announced his withdrawal from the tournament on January 30, 2024, as he hadn't sufficiently recovered from his previous arm injury.

Plazibat was expected to face the 2024 Glory Heavyweight Grand Prix runner-up Levi Rigters at Glory 95 on September 21, 2024. He withdrew from the bout on August 19, 2024, due to an elbow injury.

==== 2025 ====
Plazibat returned from a nearly three year long layoff to face Nordine Mahieddine at Glory Collision 8 in a Glory Last Heavyweight Standing Finals Tournament qualifier on December 13, 2025. He won the fight by unanimous decision.

==== 2026 ====
Plazibat was scheduled to face Mory Kromah at Glory 105 on February 7, 2026. He was forced to withdraw due to injury, being replaced by former two-time Middleweight title challenger Michael Boapeah.

Plazibat would make his return at Glory Collision 9, on June 13, 2026. He faced Anis Bouzid, winning via TKO, after the bout was forced to go to an extra round.

== Personal life ==
Plazibat is engaged to his long-time girlfriend Martina Dulčić, a granddaughter of Veljko Rogošić. Plazibat has a son, who was born in 2017. He is a self-professed Catholic. Plazibat also runs his own YouTube channel, and is the brother of the Croatian dancer and media personality Luciano Plazibat.

== Championships and accomplishments ==
=== Professional ===
- Final Fight Championship
  - 2014 FFC Futures Kickboxing Light Heavyweight Tournament -91 kg.
- K-1
  - 2017 K-1 Heavyweight Champion.
  - 2017 K-1 World GP 2017 Heavyweight Championship Tournament Winner
- World Association of Kickboxing Organizations
  - 2018 WAKO Pro World Low Kick Super Heavyweight Champion +94.2 kg.

=== Amateur ===
- Croatian Kickboxing Federation
  - 2013 Croatia Open Zagreb 2013 (gold) -91 kg. (Low-kick rules)
  - 2014 Croatian Kickboxing Championships (bronze) -91 kg. (Low-kick rules)
  - 2015 Croatian Kickboxing Championships (gold) -91 kg. (Low-kick rules)
  - 2016 Croatian Kickboxing Championships (gold) -91 kg. (K-1 rules)
  - 2017 Croatian Kickboxing Championships (silver) +91 kg. (Low Kick rules)
  - 2017 Croatian Kickboxing Championships (gold) +91 kg. (K-1 rules)
- World Association of Kickboxing Organizations
  - 2015 W.A.K.O. World Championships (silver) -91 kg. (Low-Kick Rules)
  - 2018 W.A.K.O. European Championships (gold) +91 kg. (K-1 Rules)

=== Awards ===
- Liverkick.com
  - 2017 Knockout of the Year (vs. Makoto Uehara)
- Glory
  - 2019 Newcomer of the Year
  - 2019 Fight of the Year (vs. Tomáš Možný)
  - 2021 Most Improved Fighter of the Year
  - 2022 Knockout of the Year (vs. Raul Catinas)
  - 2022 Fighter of the Year

== Kickboxing record ==
Kickboxing record
24 Wins (14 (T)KO's), 5 Losses, 0 Draws, 0 No Contests
Date	Result	Opponent	Event	Location	Method	Round	Time	Record
2026-12-12		(Guinea) Mory Kromah	Glory Collision 10	Arnhem, Netherlands				
For the Glory Heavyweight Championship.
2026-06-13	Win	(Morocco) Anis Bouzid	Glory Collision 9	Rotterdam, Netherlands	KO (Punches)	4	1:39	24–5
2025-12-13	Win	(France) Nordine Mahieddine	Glory Collision 8	Arnhem, Netherlands	Decision (Unanimous)	3	3:00	23–5
Qualifies for Glory Last Heavyweight Standing Finals Tournament.
2023-06-17	Loss	(Nigeria) Tariq Osaro	Glory: Collision 5	Rotterdam, Netherlands	KO (Punches and knee)	5	2:08	22–5
For the interim Glory Heavyweight Championship.
2022-11-19	Win	(Romania) Raul Cătinaș	Glory 82	Bonn, Germany	KO (Punches)	1	1:44	22–4
2022-05-14	Win	(Morocco) Tarik Khbabez	Glory 80 Studio	Netherlands	KO (Punches)	3	0:52	21–4
2021-10-23	Win	(Romania) Benjamin Adegbuyi	Glory: Collision 3	Arnhem, Netherlands	KO (Punches)	2	0:24	20–4
2021-09-04	Win	(Morocco) Tarik Khbabez	Glory 78: Rotterdam	Rotterdam, Netherlands	KO (Punches)	2	2:14	19–4
2020-12-19	Loss	(France) Nordine Mahieddine	Glory 76: Rotterdam, Tournament Semi Final	Rotterdam, Netherlands	Ext.Round Decision (Split)	4	3:00	18–4
2019-12-21	Win	(Netherlands) Jahfarr Wilnis	Glory Collision 2	Arnhem, Netherlands	Decision (Split)	3	3:00	18–3
2019-10-12	Win	(Slovakia) Tomáš Možný	Glory 69: Düsseldorf	Düsseldorf, Germany	Decision (Unanimous)	3	3:00	17–3
2019-06-22	Win	(France) Nordine Mahieddine	Glory 66: Paris	Paris, France	Decision (Unanimous)	3	3:00	16–3
2018-11-24	Win	(Poland) Michal Turynski	Memorijal Ludviga Lutka Pavlovica	Ljubuški, Bosnia and Herzegovina	KO (Right Straight)	3	N/A	15–3
Wins WAKO Pro World Low Kick Championship +94.2 kg.
2018-05-12	Loss	(Lithuania) Sergej Maslobojev	ONE Championship: Grit and Glory	Jakarta, Indonesia	Decision (Unanimous)	3	3:00	14–3
2018-03-21	Loss	(Netherlands) Roel Mannaart	K-1 World GP 2018: K'FESTA.1	Saitama, Japan	Decision (Unanimous)	3	3:00	14–2
Lost the K-1 Heavyweight (Open) Championship.
2017-11-23	Win	(Morocco) Ibrahim El Bouni	K-1 World GP 2017 Japan Heavyweight Championship Tournament, Final	Saitama, Japan	Decision (Unanimous)	3	3:00	14–1
Wins K-1 World GP 2017 Heavyweight Championship Tournament and the inaugural K-1 Heavyweight Championship.
2017-11-23	Win	(Japan) Makoto Uehara	K-1 World GP 2017 Japan Heavyweight Championship Tournament, Semi Finals	Saitama, Japan	KO (Flying Knee)	1	2:09	13–1
2017-11-23	Win	(Japan) K-Jee	K-1 World GP 2017 Japan Heavyweight Championship Tournament, Quarter Finals	Saitama, Japan	KO (Left Hook to the Body)	1	1:40	12–1
2017-08-26	Win	(China) Liang Jie	SUPERKOMBAT World Grand Prix III 2017	Shenzhen, China	Decision (Unanimous)	3	3:00	11–1
2016-09-10	Win	(Spain) Frank Muñoz	W5 European League XXXVI	Zvolen, Slovakia	Decision (Unanimous)	3	3:00	10–1
2016-08-06	Win	(Romania) Dănuț Hurduc	SUPERKOMBAT World Grand Prix IV 2016	Comănești, Romania	Decision (Unanimous)	3	3:00	9–1
2016-07-02	Win	(Romania) Bogdan Stoica	Respect World Series 2	London, England	TKO (Leg Injury)	2	N/A	8–1
2016-02-19	Loss	(Lithuania) Sergej Maslobojev	FFC22: Athens	Athens, Greece	TKO (Cut)	2	3:00	7–1
2015-09-18	Win	(Czech Republic) Daniel Škvor	FFC 19 - Linz	Linz, Austria	TKO (Three Knockdowns)	2	2:42	7–0
2015-03-13	Win	(Serbia) Bojan Džepina	FFC 7: Poturak vs. Munoz	Sarajevo, Bosnia and Herzegovina	TKO (Referee Stoppage)	3	2:14	6–0
2014-12-20	Win	(Serbia) Mitar Dugalić	FFC 17 Futures Super Finals, Final	Opatija, Croatia	KO (Right Straight)	3	0:44	5–0
Wins the FFC Futures Kickboxing Light Heavyweight Tournament -91 kg.
2014-12-20	Win	(Croatia) Stipe Stipetić	FFC 17 Futures Super Finals, Semi Finals	Opatija, Croatia	TKO	2	1:42	4–0
2014-11-29	Win	(Slovenia) Franci Grajš	International Muay Thai League (-91 kg)	Novo Mesto, Slovenia	Decision (Points)	3	3:00	3–0
2014-08-22	Win	(Croatia) Simon Krizmanić	Trojan Fight Night 2	Pula, Croatia	Decision (Majority)	3	2:00	2–0
2013-08-04	Win	(Croatia) Marko Vidović	Oluja u Ringu 5	Knin, Croatia	KO (High Kick)	3	N/A	1–0
Professional debut.

Amateur kickboxing record
18 Wins (3 (T)KO's), 3 Losses, 0 Draws, 0 No Contests
Date	Result	Opponent	Event	Location	Method	Round	Time
2018-10-20	Win	(Azerbaijan) Bahram Rajabzadeh	W.A.K.O European Championships 2018, K-1 Final +91 kg	Bratislava, Slovakia	2:1	3	2:00
Wins W.A.K.O. European Championship '18 K-1 Gold Medal +91 kg.
2018-10-19	Win	(Belarus) Petr Romankevich	W.A.K.O European Championships 2018, K-1 Semi Finals +91 kg	Bratislava, Slovakia	2:1	3	2:00
2018-10-18	Win	(Turkey) Hamdi Saygili	W.A.K.O European Championships 2018, K-1 Quarter Finals +91 kg	Bratislava, Slovakia	TKO	2	N/A
2017-06-03	Win	(Croatia) Tomislav Čikotić	Croatian Kickboxing Championship 2017, K-1 Finals +91 kg	Benkovac, Croatia	3:0	3	2:00
Wins Croatian Kickboxing Championship 2017 K-1 Gold Medal +91 kg.
2017-06-03	Win	(Croatia) Ante Verunica	Croatian Kickboxing Championship 2017, K-1 Semifinals +91 kg	Benkovac, Croatia	3:0	3	2:00
2017-04-30	Loss	(Croatia) Tomislav Čikotić	Croatian Kickboxing Championship 2017, Low Kick Finals +91 kg	Opatija, Croatia	3:0	3	2:00
Wins Croatian Kickboxing Championship 2017 Low Kick Silver Medal +91 kg.
2017-04-30	Win	(Croatia) Ante Verunica	Croatian Kickboxing Championship 2017, Low Kick Semifinals +91 kg	Opatija, Croatia	WO	N/A	N/A
2017-04-30	Win	(Croatia) Davor Krstulović	Croatian Kickboxing Championship 2017, Low Kick Quarterfinals +91 kg	Opatija, Croatia	3:0	3	2:00
2016-05-28	Win	(Croatia) Anto Širić	Croatian Kickboxing Championship 2016, K-1 Semi Finals -91 kg	Benkovac, Croatia	3:0	3	2:00
Wins Croatian Kickboxing Championship 2016 K-1 Gold Medal -91 kg.
2016-05-28	Win	(Croatia) Leo Pavičić	Croatian Kickboxing Championship 2016, K-1 Semi Finals -91 kg	Benkovac, Croatia	3:0	3	2:00
2015-10-31	Loss	(Russia) Basir Abakarov	W.A.K.O World Championships 2015, Low-Kick Final -91 kg	Belgrade, Serbia	3:0	3	2:00
Wins W.A.K.O. World Championship '15 Low-Kick Silver Medal -91 kg.
2015-10-30	Win	(Serbia) Bojan Džepina	W.A.K.O World Championships 2015, Low-Kick Semi Finals -91 kg	Belgrade, Serbia	3:0	3	2:00
2015-10-29	Win	(Azerbaijan) Zamig Athakishiyev	W.A.K.O World Championships 2015, Low-Kick 1/8 Finals -91 kg	Belgrade, Serbia	3:0	3	2:00
2015-10-27	Win	(Moldova) Vladislav Gribincea	W.A.K.O World Championships 2015, Low-Kick 1/16 Finals -91 kg	Belgrade, Serbia	KO	N/A	N/A
2015-04-11	Win	(Croatia) Andrija Lekić	Croatian Kickboxing Championship 2015, Low-kick Final -91 kg	Poreč, Croatia	3:0	3	2:00
Wins Croatian Kickboxing Championship 2015 Low-kick Gold Medal -91 kg.
2015-04-11	Win	(Croatia) Toni Čatipović	Croatian Kickboxing Championship 2015, Low-kick Semi Finals -91 kg	Poreč, Croatia	2:1	3	2:00
2015-04-11	Win	(Croatia) Nenad Kovačević	Croatian Kickboxing Championship 2015, Low-kick Quarter Finals -91 kg	Poreč, Croatia	3:0	3	2:00
2014-04-12	Loss	(Croatia) Andrija Lekić	Croatian Kickboxing Championship 2014, Low-kick Semi Finals -91 kg	Poreč, Croatia	3:0	3	2:00
Wins Croatian Kickboxing Championship 2014 Low-kick Bronze Medal -91 kg.
2014-04-12	Win	(Croatia) Josip Perica	Croatian Kickboxing Championship 2014, Low-kick Quarter Finals -91 kg	Poreč, Croatia	3:0	3	2:00
2013-12-15	Win	(Croatia) Andrija Lekić	Croatia Open Zagreb 2013, Low-kick Final -91 kg	Zagreb, Croatia	3:0	3	2:00
Wins Croatia Open Zagreb 2013 Low-kick Gold Medal -91 kg.
2013-12-15	Win	(Croatia) Dražen Kuraja	Croatia Open Zagreb 2013, Low-kick Semi Finals -91 kg	Zagreb, Croatia	3:0	3	2:00
Legend: Win Loss Draw/No contest Notes

== See also ==
- List of K-1 champions
- List of male kickboxers
