= Donegi Abena =

Surinamese-Dutch kickboxer and mixed martial artist (born 1998)

- Born: February 23, 1998 (age 28); Paramaribo, Suriname
- Other names: Silverback
- Height: 1.92 m (6 ft 3 1/2 in)
- Weight: 95 kg (209 lb; 15.0 st)
- Division: Light Heavyweight
- Style: Kickboxing
- Stance: Orthodox
- Fighting out of: Utrecht, Netherlands
- Team: SB Gym; Mike's Gym (former)
- Trainer: Said El Badaoui
- Years active: 2015–2025 (kickboxing); 2026–present (MMA)

Kickboxing record
- Total: 42
- Wins: 31
- By knockout: 11
- Losses: 11
- By knockout: 2

Mixed martial arts record
- Total: 1
- Wins: 1
- By knockout: 1
- Losses: 0

Other information
- Website: https://donegiabena.com/
- Mixed martial arts record from Sherdog

Donegi Abena (born February 23, 1998) is a Surinamese-Dutch kickboxer and mixed martial artist who currently competes in the Light Heavyweight division of the Professional Fighters League (PFL). As a kickboxer, Abena formerly competed in the Light Heavyweight division of Glory, where he is the former Glory Light Heavyweight champion.

As of 1 June 2024, Abena is ranked the #1 light-heavyweight in the world by GLORY. He's been ranked in the Combat Press top ten since November 2018.

== Kickboxing career ==
=== Early career ===
Abena made his professional debut against Elmir Mehić at WFL: Bosnia on September 25, 2015. He won the bout by split decision.

Abena was scheduled to face Jan Soukup at Večer Bojovníků Thajského Boxu VII on December 19, 2015. Soukup won the fight by unanimous decision. He was afterwards scheduled to face Petr Romankevich in the quarterfinals of the 2016 Tatneft Cup. He lost the fight by an extra round decision, thus entering the first losing streak of his career.

Abena snapped the losing streak with a first-round knockout of Maurice Jackson at FFC 25: Mitchell vs Lopez on June 10, 2016. Over the next six months, Abena would furthermore notch a knockout victory over Andrey Ohotnik on July 22, as well as decision victories against Dzhobir Tashmatov on August 23, and Andress van Engelen on November 5. This five-fight winning streak earned the a place in the 2016 WLF Super Heavyweight Tournament, held on December 3, 2016. He won the rematch with Petr Romankevich in the quarterfinals by decision, but lost to Jairzinho Rozenstruik by a first-round knockout in the finals.

Abena was scheduled to fight Fabien Fouquet at FFC 29 on April 22, 2017. Abena won the fight by a first-round technical knockout.

=== A1 World Combat Cup ===
On May 13, 2017, Abena took part in the A1 WCC Heavyweight Qualification Tournament. He won the semifinal match against Wendell Roche and the final match against Brian Douwes in the same manner, by decision.

Abena was scheduled to fight Clyde Brunswijk at Blood, Sweat and Tears on December 22, 2017. He won the fight by decision.

On May 5, 2018, Abena participated in the 2018 A1WCC Champions League Tournament, with a €110 000. Abena beat Luis Tavares by an extra round decision in the quarterfinal, Adnan Rezovic by decision in the semifinals and faced Mohamed Abdellah in the finals. Abdellah won the final bout by decision.

Abena was scheduled to face Andrei Stoica at ACB KB 16 on July 13, 2018. He won the fight by decision.

=== GLORY ===
Abena made his Glory debut against Stephane Susperregui at Glory 60: Lyon on October 20, 2018. Abena won the fight by unanimous decision, with one of the judges scoring the bout 30–27 in his favor, while three of the judges scored it as 29-28 for Abena.

Abena was scheduled to face the #4 ranked Glory light heavyweight Michael Duut at Glory 64: Strasbourg on March 9, 2019. Abena won the fight by split decision, with three judges scoring the bout in his favor (30–27, 29–28, 29–28) and two judges scoring the bout in Duut's favor (30–27, 29–28).

His two victories with the promotion left Abena as the top-ranked contender, earning him the right to challenge the reigning Glory Light Heavyweight champion Artem Vakhitov at Glory 66: Paris on June 22, 2019. Vakhitov won the fight by a split decision, with four of the judges scoring the fight for him (49–46, 49–46, 48–47, 48–47), while the last judge scored the bout 48-47 for Abena.

Abena was scheduled to face the reigning GLORY Middleweight champion Alex Pereira for the interim Glory Light Heavyweight Championship at Glory 68: Miami on September 28, 2019. Pereira won the fight by a third-round knockout, landing a left hook in the last minute of the round.

Abena returned from a 14-month layoff to face Luis Tavares at Glory 77: Rotterdam on January 30, 2021. Tavares won the fight by unanimous decision. Abena was scheduled to face Sergej Maslobojev at Glory: Collision 3 on October 23, 2021, in his second fight of the year. He lost the closely contested fight by split decision.

Abena faced the #2 ranked Glory light heavyweight contender Felipe Micheletti at Glory: Collision 4 on October 8, 2022. He won the fight by unanimous decision.

==== Glory Light Heavyweight champion ====
Abena challenged Sergej Maslobojev for the Glory Light Heavyweight Championship at Glory 83 on February 11, 2023. He won the fight by a fourth-round technical knockout. The fight was stopped by the ringside physician due to a cut on Maslobojev's shin.

Abena was expected to make his first title defense against the one-time ONE Kickboxing Light Heavyweight Championship and Glory Light Heavyweight Championship title challenger Tarik Khbabez at Glory: Collision 5 on June 17, 2023. Abena withdrew from the fight with food poisoning on June 14. The fight was rescheduled to take place at Glory: Collision 6 on November 4, 2023. Khbabez withdrew from the fight with a hand injury on October 31, and was replaced by Mohamed Touchassie. Abena retained the title by unanimous decision.

Abena made his second Glory Light Heavyweight championship defense against Tarik Khbabez at Glory Heavyweight Grand Prix on March 9, 2024. He lost the fight by split decision.

Abena faced Ștefan Lătescu in the quarterfinals of the Glory Light Heavyweight Grand Prix, held on June 8, 2024, in Rotterdam, Netherlands. He won the fight by a third-round technical knockout, as he stopped Lătescu with low kicks 59 seconds into the third round. Abena likewise stopped Tarik Khbabez with low kicks in the semifinals, which earned him a place in the tournament finals opposite Bahram Rajabzadeh. Abena captured the tournament title, as well as the $100,00 prize, by a first-round stoppage.

==== Abena vs. Khababez 3 ====
in October 2024, it was confirmed that Abena would face Tarik Khababez for the third and final time at Glory: Collision 7 on December 7 for the Glory Light Heavyweight Title. Abena lost the fight by Split decision when all of the judges scored the fight 49-47, one for Abena but the rest for Khababez. After the fight in the interview, Abena announced his retirement, he later said he discussed with Glory and was no longer retiring.

== Mixed martial arts career ==
Abena was expected to make his mixed martial arts debut against Paolo Anastasi at Ares FC 7: Abdouraguimov vs. Amoussou on June 25, 2022. The bout was later cancelled for undisclosed reasons.

On December 16, 2025, it was announced that Abena signed with the Professional Fighters League.

Abena made his professional MMA debut against Joe Schilling on May 23, 2026, at PFL Brussels. The bout was ended when Schilling refused to continue the fight after being fouled by a headbutt in 36 seconds into the first round. Therefore, Abena awarded by TKO victory via Schilling’s retirement from the fight, despite the obvious foul.

== Professional boxing career ==
On June 14, 2025, Abena announced that he had signed a long-term promotional deal with Queensberry Promotions.

== Titles and accomplishments ==
- GLORY
  - 2023 Glory Light Heavyweight Championship
    - One successful title defense
  - 2024 Glory Light Heavyweight Grand Prix winner
  - 2024 Fight of the Year (vs. Tarik Khbabez at Glory Collision 7

== Mixed martial arts record ==
Professional record breakdown
1 match	1 win	0 losses
By knockout	1	0

Res.	Record	Opponent	Method	Event	Date	Round	Time	Location	Notes
Win	1–0	Joe Schilling	TKO (retirement)	PFL Brussels: Habirora vs. Henderson	May 23, 2026	1	0:36	Brussels, Belgium	Light Heavyweight debut. Abena was deducted one point in round 1 due to a headbutt.

== Kickboxing record ==
Kickboxing record
31 wins (11 (T)KOs), 11 losses, 0 draws
Date	Result	Opponent	Event	Location	Method	Round	Time
2025-10-05	Win	(Morocco) Tarik Cherkaoui	World Fighting League	The Hague, Netherlands	TKO (3 knockdowns)	1	
2024-12-07	Loss	(Morocco) Tarik Khbabez	Glory Collision 7	Arnhem, Netherlands	Decision (split)	5	3:00
For the Glory Light Heavyweight Championship.
2024-06-08	Win	(Azerbaijan) Bahram Rajabzadeh	Glory Light Heavyweight Grand Prix, Final	Rotterdam, Netherlands	TKO (referee stop./punches)	1	2:43
Wins the 2024 Glory Light Heavyweight Grand Prix.
2024-06-08	Win	(Morocco) Tarik Khbabez	Glory Light Heavyweight Grand Prix, Semifinals	Rotterdam, Netherlands	KO (low kick)	2	0:30
2024-06-08	Win	(Romania) Ștefan Lătescu	Glory Light Heavyweight Grand Prix, Quarterfinals	Rotterdam, Netherlands	TKO (low kicks)	3	0:59
2024-03-09	Loss	(Morocco) Tarik Khbabez	Glory Heavyweight Grand Prix	Arnhem, Netherlands	Decision (split)	5	3:00
Loses the Glory Light Heavyweight Championship.
2023-11-04	Win	(Morocco) Mohamed Touchassie	Glory: Collision 6	Arnhem, Netherlands	Decision (unanimous)	5	3:00
Defends the Glory Light Heavyweight Championship.
2023-02-11	Win	(Lithuania) Sergej Maslobojev	Glory 83	Essen, Germany	TKO (doctor stoppage)	4	2:15
Wins the Glory Light Heavyweight Championship.
2022-10-08	Win	(Brazil) Felipe Micheletti	Glory: Collision 4	Arnhem, Netherlands	Decision (unanimous)	3	3:00
2021-10-23	Loss	(Lithuania) Sergej Maslobojev	Glory: Collision 3	Arnhem, Netherlands	Decision (split)	3	3:00
2021-01-30	Loss	(Netherlands) Luis Tavares	Glory 77: Rotterdam	Rotterdam, Netherlands	Decision (unanimous)	3	3:00
2019-09-28	Loss	(Brazil) Alex Pereira	Glory 68: Miami	Miami, United States	KO (left hook)	3	2:08
For the interim Glory Light Heavyweight Championship
2019-06-22	Loss	(Russia) Artem Vakhitov	Glory 66: Paris	Paris, France	Decision (split)	5	3:00
For the Glory Light Heavyweight Championship.
2019-03-09	Win	(Netherlands) Michael Duut	Glory 64: Strasbourg	Strasbourg, France	Decision (split)	3	3:00
2018-10-20	Win	(France) Stephane Susperregui	Glory 60: Lyon	Lyon, France	Decision (unanimous)	3	3:00
2018-07-13	Win	(Romania) Andrei Stoica	ACB KB 16	Târgoviște, Romania	Decision (split)	3	3:00
2018-05-05	Loss	(Germany) Mohamed Abdallah	A1WCC Champions League, Final	Hasselt, Belgium	Decision	3	3:00
For the A1WCC Champions League Tournament.
2018-05-05	Win	(Bosnia and Herzegovina) Adnan Rezovic	A1WCC Champions League, Semi Final	Hasselt, Belgium	Decision	3	3:00
2018-05-05	Win	(Cape Verde) Luis Tavares	A1WCC Champions League, Quarter Final	Hasselt, Belgium	Ext R. decision (unanimous)	4	3:00
2017-12-22	Win	(Suriname) Clyde Brunswijk	Blood, Sweat and Tears	Paramaribo, Suriname	Decision	3	3:00
2017-05-13	Win	(Netherlands) Brian Douwes	A1 World Combat Cup, Final	Eindhoven, Netherlands	Decision	3	3:00
Wins A1 WCC Heavyweight Qualification Tournament Title.
2017-05-13	Win	(Curaçao) Wendell Roche	A1 World Combat Cup, Semi Finals	Eindhoven, Netherlands	Decision	3	3:00
2017-04-22	Win	(France) Fabien Fouquet	FFC 29	Ljubljana, Slovenia	TKO (liver shot)	1	2:35
2016-12-03	Loss	(Suriname) Jairzinho Rozenstruik	Wu Lin Feng 2016: WLF x Krush - China vs Japan	Zhengzhou, China	KO	1	
For the WLF Super Heavyweight Tournament.
2016-12-03	Win	(Belarus) Petr Romankevich	Wu Lin Feng 2016: WLF x Krush - China vs Japan	Zhengzhou, China	Decision	3	3:00
2016-11-05	Win	(Netherlands) Andress van Engelen	A1 World Combat Cup	Germany	Decision	3	3:00
2016-08-23	Win	(Uzbekistan) Dzhobir Tashmatov	Akhmat Fight Show	Grozny, Russia	Decision (unanimous)	3	3:00
2016-07-22	Win	(Ukraine) Andrey Ohotnik	Tatneft Cup 2016 - 1st selection 1/4 final	Kazan, Russia	KO	2	
2016-06-10	Win	(United States) Maurice Jackson	FFC 25: Mitchell vs Lopez	Springfield, Massachusetts, USA	TKO (punches)	1	1:10
2016-03-06	Loss	(Belarus) Petr Romankevich	Tatneft Cup 2016 - 2nd selection 1/8 final	Kazan, Russia	Decision	4	3:00
2015-12-19	Loss	(Czech Republic) Jan Soukup	Večer Bojovníků Thajského Boxu VII.	Liberec, Czech Republic	Decision (unanimous)	3	3:00
2015-09-25	Win	(Bosnia and Herzegovina) Elmir Mehić	WFL: Bosnia	Laktaši, Bosnia and Herzegovina	Decision (split)	3	3:00
Legend: Win Loss Draw/no contest Notes

Amateur kickboxing record (incomplete)
Date	Result	Opponent	Event	Location	Method	Round	Time
2015-02-08	Win	(Netherlands) Mohammed Balli	Muay Thai Centre Clyde van Dams	Netherlands	Decision	3	1:30
2014-12-14	Win	(Netherlands) Mohamed Gabri	Maxifit/Mejiro Wormer gala	Netherlands	Decision	3	1:30
2014-10-18	Win	(Netherlands) Marwin Gietmann	MTBG Ruble Event 15	Netherlands	Decision	3	1:30
2014-10-05	Win	(Netherlands) Fabio Brent	Go Hard Or Go Home 7	Tilburg, Netherlands	Decision	3	1:30
N Class.
Legend: Win Loss Draw/no contest Notes

== See also ==
- List of male kickboxers
