= Stéphane Susperregui =

French kickboxer (born 1984)

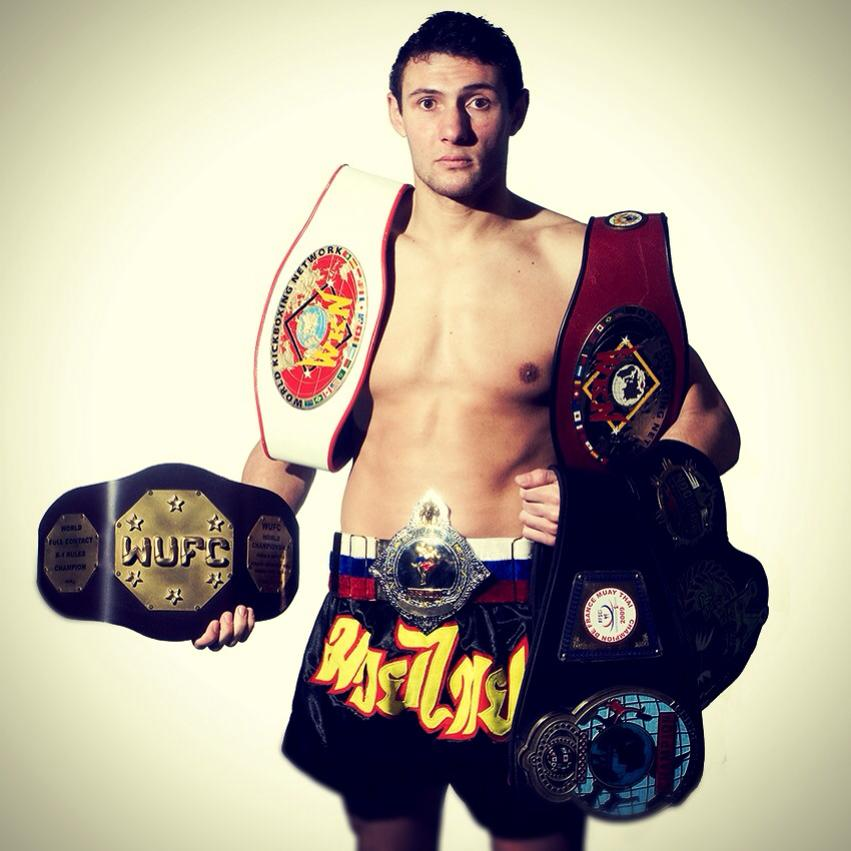
- Susperregui in 2013
- Born: Stéphane Susperregui; August 31, 1984 (age 42); Saint-Jean-de-Luz, France
- Other names: Stéphane "Ippo" Susperregui
- Nationality: French
- Height: 1.88 m (6 ft 2 in)
- Weight: 96 kg (212 lb; 15 st 2 lb)
- Division: Heavyweight
- Style: Muay Thai, Kickboxing, K1
- Stance: Orthodox
- Fighting out of: Saint-Jean-de-Luz, France
- Team: Iparralde Fight Club
- Years active: 2008 - present

Kickboxing record
- Total: 59
- Wins: 50
- By knockout: 27
- Losses: 7
- By knockout: 2
- Draws: 1
- No contests: 1
- Last updated on: January 15, 2016

Stéphane Ippo Susperregui (born 31 August 1984) is a French kickboxer. He is the current WKN World Oriental Rules Heavyweight and former WKA K-1 World Heavyweight champion.

He is ranked as the fifth best light heavyweight in the world by Combat Press as of September 2022, and sixth best by Beyond Kick as of October 2022.

== Biography and career ==
Susperregui fought two of the best -95 kg Muaythai fighters, Australians 2010, Steve McKinnon for his WBC Muaythai Super Cruiserweight World title and 2012, Nathan Corbett for his W.K.N. Muay Thai World title, he lost both fights by decision but put up a good fight.

In 2011 he became WKN kickboxing oriental heavyweight champion defeating Spains Damian Garcia, he was also double WKN kickboxing Grand Prix champion. In 2011 he defeated Tefik Bajrami and Nicolas Wamba and in 2012 at Le Banner Series he defeated Julius Mocka and Enfusion Quest for honor tournament runner up Frank Muñoz after tough fight and extra round.

In 2012 he signed for Glory and fought It's Showtime -95 kg champion Danyo Ilunga in his debut on 23 March 2013 in London, losing by a flying knee KO in round two.

He won the NDC -100 kg/220 lb title with a decision win over Abderhamane Coulibaly at La 20ème Nuit des Champions in Marseille, France on November 23, 2013.

In February 2016, Stephane fought Ludovic Providence for the K-1 Event Light Heavyweight Championship -95 kg title. He won the fight by a first-round TKO.

During the June 2017 Monte Carlo Fighting Masters event, Stephane fought Sergej Maslobojev for the WAKO World K-1 94 kg title. Maslobojev won the fight by TKO, after Susperregui's corner threw in the towel in the fourth round.

Susperregui took part in the 2018 Fight Night Saint-Tropez tournament. In the semifinals, he defeated Wladimir Tok by a third-round TKO, but lost the final bout against Arnold Oborotov by decision.

Stephane made his Glory debut against Donegi Abena at Glory 60. Abena won the fight by unanimous decision. For his next fight, he was scheduled to fight Felipe Micheletti, whom he defeated by decision, after an extra round was fought. He was scheduled to fight Luis Tavares during Glory Collision 2. Tavares won the fight by unanimous decision.

Susperregui participated in the K-1 Event -95 kg tournament, held on December 4, 2021. He won the tournament title after defeating Pascal Touré by decision in the semifinals, and Yuri Farcas by decision in the finals.

Susperregui was booked to face Oleg Primachev in Bilbao, Spain on March 26, 2022. The bout was later cancelled, as Primachev was unable to enter Spain due to the 2022 Russian invasion of Ukraine.

== Titles ==
- 2018 Fight Night Saint-Tropez Heavyweight Tournament Runner-up
- 2016 K-1 Event Light Heavyweight Champion -95 kg
- 2013 NDC K-1 rules light heavyweight champion -100 kg
- 2013 WKA K-1 rules World Heavyweight champion -95 kg
- 2012 WKN kickboxing GP champion -100 kg
- 2011 WKN kickboxing GP champion -100 kg
- 2011 WKN kickboxing oriental heavyweight world champion -96,6 kg
- 2010 French K-1 champion +91 kg
- 2010 French muay thai Elite class A champion -86 kg
- 2009 French muay thai Elite class A champion -86 kg
- 2008 WUFC K-1 world champion -88 kg
- 2008 French muay thai class B champion -86 kg
- 2007 French muay thai cup winner

== Kickboxing record ==
Kickboxing record
50 Wins (27 (T)KO), 7 Losses , 1 Draw , 1 No contest
Date	Result	Opponent	Event	Location	Method	Round	Time
2021-12-04	Win	(France) Pascal Touré	K-1 Event 14, Tournament Finals	Troyes, France	Decision	3	3:00
Wins the K-1 Event -95kg tournament.
2021-12-04	Win	(Romania) Yuri Farcaș	K-1 Event 14, Tournament Semifinals	Troyes, France	Decision	3	3:00
2019-12-21	Loss	(Netherlands) Luis Tavares	Glory Collision 2	Arnhem, Netherlands	Decision (Unanimous)	3	3:00
2019-10-12	Win	(Brazil) Felipe Micheletti	Glory 69: Düsseldorf	Düsseldorf, Germany	Ext.R Decision (Unanimous)	4	3:00
2018-10-20	Loss	(Suriname) Donegi Abena	Glory 60: Lyon	Lyon, France	Decision (Unanimous)	3	3:00
2018-08-04	Loss	(Lithuania) Arnold Oborotov	Fight Night Saint-Tropez	Saint-Tropez, France	Decision (unanimous)	3	
2018-08-04	Win	(Germany) Wladimir Tok	Fight Night Saint-Tropez	Saint-Tropez, France	TKO	3	
2018-06-30	Win	(Russia) Mikhail Tyuterev	Monte-Carlo Fighting Trophy	Monaco	Decision (Split)	3	3:00
2017-08-04	Win	(Germany) Danyo Ilunga	Fight Night Saint-Tropez	France	Decision (Unanimous)	3	3:00
2017-06-30	Loss	(Lithuania) Sergej Maslobojev	Monte Carlo Fighting Masters	Monte Carlo, Monaco	TKO (Towel Thrown)	4	
For the W.A.K.O. Pro World K1 Rules Cruiser Heavyweight Championship -94.1 kg.
2017-05-20	Win	(Moldova) Pavel Voronin	Capital Fights 2	Paris, France	Decision	3	3:00
2016-11-19	NC	(Ukraine) Roman Kryklia	Nuit des Champions 2016	Marseille, France	No contest	3	3:00
Originally a MD win for Kryklia, later ruled a NC after Kryklia failed a drug test.
2016-08-04	Win	(Russia) Suleyman Magomedov	Fight Night Saint Tropez	Saint-Tropez, France	Decision	3	3:00
2016-06-03	Win	(Moldova) Pavel Voronin	Phenix Boxing Only Edition 4	Saint-Julien-en-Genevois, France	Decision (Unanimous)	3	3:00
2016-02-20	Win	(France) Ludovic Providence	K-1 Events 8	Troyes, France	TKO	1	
Wins K-1 Event Light Heavyweight Championship -95 kg.
2013-11-23	Win	(France) Abdarhmane Coulibaly	La 20ème Nuit des Champions	Marseille, France	Decision	3	3:00
Wins NDC K-1 rules light heavyweight -100 kg title.
2013-06-08	Win	(Spain) Lorenzo Javier Jorge	K-1 EVENT 5	Troyes, France	TKO	2	
Wins WKA K-1 rules World Heavyweight title -95 kg.
2013-03-23	Loss	(Democratic Republic of the Congo) Danyo Ilunga	Glory 5: London	London, United Kingdom	KO (flying knee)	2	0:21
2012-11-24	Win	(France) Emmanuel Payet	Nuit des Champions	Marseille, France	KO	3	
2012-06-30	Win	(Croatia) Toni Milanović	F.A.S.T. gala	Bayonne, France	Decision (Unanimous)		3:00
2012-04-28	Win	(Spain) Frank Muñoz	Le Banner Series Acte 1, Final	Geneva, Switzerland	Ext.R.Decision	4	2:00
Wins WKN kickboxing GP 2012 -100 kg title.
2012-04-28	Win	(Lithuania) Julius Mocka	Le Banner Series Acte 1, Semi Finals	Geneva, Switzerland	Decision	3	2:00
2012-04-07	Loss	(Australia) Nathan Corbett	Fight Night Total Carnage	Gold Coast, Australia	Decision	5	3:00
For Corbett's WKN Muay Thai World title -95 kg.
2012-02-25	Win	(Serbia) Milan Dašić	Championnat de France K-1		TKO		
2011-10-15	Win	(Lithuania) Arnold Oborotov	Le Choc des Titans II	Graulhet, France	Decision	3	3:00
2011-05-07	Win	(France) Nicolas Wamba	7ème Nuit des Sports de Combat, Final	Geneva, Switzerland	TKO (Doctor Stop.)	2	
Wins WKN kickboxing GP 2011 -100 kg title.
2011-05-07	Win	(Albania) Tefik Bajrami	7ème Nuit des Sports de Combat, Semi Finals	Geneva, Switzerland	KO	2	
2011-05-24	Win	(Spain) Damian Garcia		Troyes, France	KO	2	
Wins vacant WKN kickboxing oriental heavyweight -96,6 kg World title.
2011-03-12	Win	(France) Massinissa Hamaili		Bayonne, France	Decision	5	3:00
2010-12-19	Loss	(Australia) Steve McKinnon	WCK Muay Thai	Hainan Island, China	Decision (Majority)	5	3:00
For McKinnon's WBC Muaythai Super Cruiserweight World title.
2010-02-27	Draw	(Turkey) Yuksel Ayaydin	La Nuit du Muay Thai VII	France	Decision Draw	3	3:00
2010-02-06	Win	(France) Zinedine Hameur-Lain	Gala de Saumur	France	TKO	3	
2010-04-24	Win	(France) Corentin Jallon	Fight Zone 4	France	Decision	3	3:00
2008-08-22	Win	(Armenia) Artur Avakyan	14th WUFC World Ultimate Full Contact	Viseu, Portugal	KO (Right high kick)	1	00:33
Wins WUFC K-1 world title -88 kg.

== See also ==
- List of male kickboxers
