= Vladimir Mineev =

Russian mixed martial artist

Vladimir Mineev Владимир Минеев
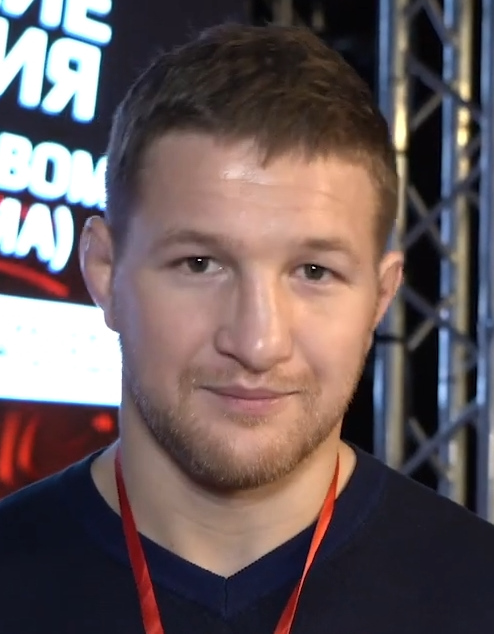
- Mineev in 2020
- Born: Vladimir Konstantinovich Mineev; February 16, 1990 (age 36); Yekaterinburg, Russian SFSR, Soviet Union
- Other names: Big Dillashaw
- Nationality: Russian
- Height: 1.84 m (6 ft 1/2 in)
- Weight: 84 kg (185 lb; 13 st 3 lb)
- Division: Light heavyweight (Kickboxing); Middleweight (MMA)
- Style: Kickboxing
- Fighting out of: Moscow, Russia
- Team: Fight Nights Gym
- Years active: 2008–present (Kickboxing); 2014–present (MMA)

Kickboxing record
- Total: 29
- Wins: 27
- By knockout: 13
- Losses: 2
- By knockout: 0

Mixed martial arts record
- Total: 18
- Wins: 16
- By knockout: 11
- By submission: 3
- By decision: 2
- Losses: 1
- By decision: 1
- Draws: 1

Other information
- Mixed martial arts record from Sherdog
- Last updated on: March 14, 2022

Vladimir Konstantinovich Mineev (Russian: Влади́мир Константи́нович Минее́в; born February 16, 1990) is a Russian Middleweight kickboxer and mixed martial artist.

== Biography ==
Vladimir Mineev was born on February 16, 1990, in the suburbs of Sverdlovsk, then moved to Saransk with his family because his father had roots in this region, and from the age of three he permanently lived in Ulyanovsk . Mineev's parents are doctors, his older brother also later became a doctor (St. Petersburg). He studied at school number 75, as a child he constantly fought on the street and at school. He began to engage in kickboxing in early childhood, was trained under the guidance of trainers E.V. Golovikhin and V.V.Safonin .

Mineev was brought to Golovikhin by his father when he was 9 years old. When Mineev was 14 years old, his father died, and Golovikhin helped him in every way. Golovikhin introduced Mineev to Vladimir Merchin, under whose leadership he won the Russian championship in Japanese kickboxing a year later.

Mineev trained with Viktor Safonin before the fight with Revankho Blockland. Safonin, together with another coach, Evgeny Belik, were able to develop a technique and strategy that helped Mineev win the duel. Mineev became a student at the Moscow State University of Environmental Engineering (now the Institute of Land Reclamation, Water Management and Construction named after A. N. Kostyakov Russian State Agricultural University named after K. A. Timiryazev), subsequently graduated from the university in this specialty

In September 2022 Mineev, who is a military reservist and former paratrooper, was called up to serve in the 31st Guards Air Assault Brigade as part of Russia's partial mobilization.

== Career ==
He achieved his first serious success in the ring in 2008, when he became the champion of Russia in kickboxing for the first time and, having become a member of the Russian national team, won a gold medal at the European Championship in Portugal, held under the auspices of the W.A.K.O. A year later, at the European championship in Austria, he was defeated in the final match and received a silver medal. At the same time, he began his career in professional kickboxing, out of four fights he won in three, including winning the vacant heavyweight W.A.K.O. Pro K1 rules world championship according to WAKO Pro on December 5, 2009, knocking out Belarusian Sergei Zelinsky in the second round. he knocked out Belarusian Sergey Zelinskiy in second round.

In 2011, Mineev took bronze at the European Championship in Macedonia and had several victorious fights at the professional level, became the European WBKF champion in the second heavy weight category. The following year, in competitions in Turkey, he again became the champion of the continent among amateurs, while in the professional he won six victories and won the WKA world champion title. In 2013 and 2014 he won and defended the WKN world champion belt. Also in 2013 he took part in the Russian Thai boxing championship, took second place, losing in the final to the multiple champion of recent years Artem Vakhitov.

He fought Ali Cenik at Fight Nights: Battle of Moscow 9 in Moscow, Russia on December 15, 2012. Mineev was down in round two but he was better fighter in first and third round and earned extra round. Extra round was also in the sign on Mineev and Cenik was in knockdown, which brought him decision victory.

Mineev took on another Dutchman when he fought Revanho Blokland at Fight Nights: Battle of Moscow on February 23, 2013, and won by KO in two.

He faced Thiago Beowulf for the WKN Kickboxing Heavyweight World Championship at Fight Night Saint Tropez in Saint-Tropez, France on August 4, 2013, winning by decision.

He defended WKN Kickboxing Heavyweight World Championship at Fight Night: Battle of Moscow XV event in Moscow, Russia on March 28, 2014, defeating Sergej Maslobojev by majority decision.

He beat Mikhail Tuterev at Fight Night Saint-Tropez II in Saint-Tropez, France on August 4, 2014.

In 2014, he made his debut in fights according to mixed rules, began to perform mainly in tournaments of the Russian promotion company Fight Nights . Much attention was drawn to Mineev's fight with Magomed Ismailov, which took place on October 19, 2018, at the Fight Nights Global 90: Mineev vs. Ismailov. The fight lasted 5 rounds and ended in a draw. The decision of the judges caused a lot of controversy. In February 2020, Mineev announced that a verbal agreement had been reached on revenge with Ismailov.

At the FNG / GFC: Abdulmanap Nurmagomedov Memory Tournament, held on September 9, 2020, in Moscow, Mineev knocked out Dauren Ermekov and became the AMC Fight Nights Middleweight Championship.

On October 16, 2021, at AMC Fight Nights 105, Mineev rematched Magomed Ismailov with the AMC Fight Nights Middleweight Championship on the line. Mineev won the bout via TKO in the third round.

== Family ==
Mineev's younger brother Pyotr, a Russian military serviceman serving in the 31st Guards Air Assault Brigade of the Russian Airborne Forces, was killed in action during the 2022 Russian invasion of Ukraine.

Vladimir Mineev doesn't like to talk much about his first marriage. All we know about this story is that from that union, Vladimir has a daughter named Aurora. Later, he married Karina Tigre (real name - Karina Sokhieva). However, the marriage didn't last long and was marked by scandalous news.

Now, Mineev is married to an English language teacher, Ekaterina, and they have a son named Mikhail.

== Titles ==
Professional

- 2013 WKN Kickboxing Heavyweight World Champion -96.6 kg (1 Title Def.)
- 2013 WAKO-Pro K1 Rules Cruiser Heavyweight World Champion -94.1 kg
- 2012 WKA Kickboxing Heavyweight World Champion
- 2011 WBKF K-1 Rules European Champion
- 2009 WAKO-Pro K-1 Rules Super Heavyweight World Champion +94 kg

Amateur

- 2013 IFMA European Championship in Lisboa, Portugal (silver) −91 kg (Muay Thai)
- 2012 W.A.K.O. European Championships in Ankara, Turkey (gold) −91 kg (K-1 rules)
- 2011 W.A.K.O. World Championships in Skopje, Macedonia (bronze) −91 kg (K-1 rules)
- 2009 W.A.K.O. World Championships in Villach, Austria (silver) −91 kg (K-1 rules)
- 2008 W.A.K.O. European Championships in Oporto, Portugal (gold) −91 kg (K-1 rules)
- 2008 Russian K-1 kickboxing championship (gold)

=== Mixed martial arts ===
- Fight Nights Global
  - Fight Nights Middleweight Championship (One time)
    - One successful title defence

== Mixed martial arts record ==
Professional record breakdown
18 matches	16 wins	1 loss
By knockout	11	0
By submission	3	0
By decision	2	1
Draws	1	

Res.	Record	Opponent	Method	Event	Date	Round	Time	Location	Notes
Win	16–1–1	Magomed Ismailov	TKO (punches)	AMC Fight Nights 105	October 16, 2021	3	4:40	Sochi, Russia	Retained AMC Fight Nights Middleweight Championship.
Win	15–1–1	Dauren Ermekov	TKO (elbows and knee)	FNG / GFC: Abdulmanap Nurmagomedov Memory Tournament	September 9, 2020	3	2:16	Moscow, Russia	Won AMC Fight Nights Middleweight Championship.
Win	14–1–1	Artur Pronin	TKO (punches)	Leon Warriors Fighting League	May 30, 2020	1	2:48	Moscow, Russia	
Win	13–1–1	Diego Dias	Decision (unanimous)	United Donbass 2	September 19, 2019	3	5:00	Donetsk, Ukraine	
Win	12–1–1	Milos Kostic	KO	King of Warriors 2	September 7, 2019	1	2:37	Stavropol, Russia	
Draw	11–1–1	Magomed Ismailov	Draw (split)	Fight Nights Global 90: Mineev vs. Ismailov	October 19, 2018	5	5:00	Moscow, Russia	
Win	11–1	Pavel Masalski	Submission (choke)	Fight Nights Global 89	July 29, 2017	1	2:25	Bozhou, China	
Win	10–1	Andreas Michailidis	TKO (punches)	Fight Nights Global 71: Mineev vs. Michailidis	July 29, 2017	3	3:11	Moscow, Russia	
Win	9–1	Maiquel Falcão	TKO (punches)	Fight Nights Global 63: Alibekov vs. Khamitov	April 21, 2017	1	3:36	Vladivostok, Russia	
Loss	8–1	Maiquel Falcão	Decision (majority)	Fight Nights Global 56: Falcão vs. Mineev	December 9, 2016	3	5:00	Vladivostok, Russia	
Win	8–0	Yasubey Enomoto	Decision (unanimous)	Fight Nights Global 53: Day 2 - Mineev vs. Enomoto	October 8, 2016	3	5:00	Moscow, Russia	
Win	7–0	Vyacheslav Belyaev	Submission (guillotine choke)	Industrials - Zabaikalian Power	June 12, 2016	1	1:15	Irkutsk, Russia	
Win	6–0	Boris Miroshnichenko	Submission (rear-naked choke)	Fight Nights Global 44: Machaev vs. Sarnavskiy	February 26, 2016	2	2:55	Moscow, Russia	
Win	5–0	Xavier Foupa-Pokam	KO (punches)	Fight Nights 19 - Battle of Moscow	June 11, 2015	1	4:28	Moscow, Russia	
Win	4–0	Josip Perica	TKO (punches)	Pankration MFP & Fight Nights 2	Apr 18, 2015	1	3:55	Vladivostok, Russia	
Win	3–0	Mikhail Shein	TKO (punches)	Moscow Region Cup	Mar 21, 2015	1	4:08	Khimki, Russia	
Win	2–0	Ivan Sedo	TKO (punches)	Grozny Battle	Mar 14, 2015	1	3:58	Grozny, Russia	
Win	1–0	Fernando Almeida	TKO (punches)	Fight Nights - Battle of Moscow 17	Sep 30, 2014	1	1:15	Moscow, Russia	MMA debut.

== Kickboxing and Muay Thai record ==
Professional record
27 Wins (13 KO's), 2 Losses, 0 Draw
Date	Result	Opponent	Event	Location	Method	Round	Time
2024-04-28	Win	(Latvia) Konstantin Gluhov	FKR PRO 9	Ulyanovsk, Russia	Decision (Unanimous)	3	3:00
2023-09-15	Win	(Brazil) Rafael Carvalho	Fight Club REN TV - Cup of Lotus	Elista, Russia	TKO (Left hook)	2	1:58
2022-11-18	Win	(Brazil) Fernando Rodrigues Jr.	REN TV Fight Club	Moscow, Russia	TKO (Punches)	3	
2022-09-16	Win	(Bosnia and Herzegovina) Erko Jun	Cup of Lotus	Elista, Russia	TKO (Referee stoppage)	3	2:46
2014-10-31	Win	(Romania) Sebastian Ciobanu	New Stream	Moscow, Russia	TKO (Punches)	2	
2014-08-04	Win	(Russia) Mikhail Tyuterev	Fight Night Saint Tropez II	Saint-Tropez, France	Decision	3	3:00
2014-05-17	Win	(Brazil) Felipe Micheletti	WGP Kickboxing: Russia X Brasil	São Paulo, Brazil	Decision (Unanimous)	3	3:00
2014-03-28	Win	(Lithuania) Sergej Maslobojev	Fight Nights: Battle of Moscow 15	Moscow, Russia	Decision (Majority)	5	3:00
Defended WKN Kickboxing Heavyweight World Championship -96.6 kg.
2013-08-04	Win	(Brazil) Tiago Beowulf	Fight Night in France	Saint Tropez, France	Decision	5	2:00
Wins WKN Kickboxing Heavyweight World Championship -96.6 kg.
2013-04-20	Win	(Suriname) Redouan Cairo	Battle of Moscow 11	Moscow, Russia	Decision (Unanimous)	5	3:00
Wins WAKO-Pro K1 Rules Cruiser Heavyweight World Championship -94.1 kg.
2013-02-23	Win	(Netherlands) Revanho Blokland	Fight Nights: Battle of Moscow 10	Moscow, Russia	KO (left hook)	2	
2012-12-16	Win	(Turkey) Ali Cenik	Fight Nights: Battle of Moscow 9	Moscow, Russia	Ext. r. decision (unanimous)	4	3:00
2012-07-14	Win	(Germany) Daniel Dörrer	Moscow Kickboxing Championship	Moscow, Russia	Decision (Unaniomus)		3:00
Wins WKA Kickboxing Heavyweight World Title.
2012-06-20	Win	(Poland) Tomasz Sarara	Battle on Kama	Perm, Russia	Decision (Unaniomus)	5	3:00
2012-05-26	Win	(Belarus) Igor Bugaenko	Battle of Ural	Verkhnyaya Pyshma, Russia	TKO (Retirement)	3	
2012-03-08	Win	(France) David Radeff	Battle at Moscow 6	Moscow, Russia	TKO	3	
2012-02-11	Win	(France) Jeremy Damon	W.A.K.O. Pro GP France vs Russia, quarter final	Marseille, France	KO	1	
2011-10-02	Win	(Russia) Ibragim Larsanov	Ramzan Kadirov tournament	Grozny, Russia	TKO	3	1:10
2011-07-09	Win	(Slovakia) Lukas Horak	Russia vs The World	Moscow, Russia	Decision (Unanimous)	3	3:00
2011-05-22	Win	(Russia) Elvin Abbasov	Battle on Volga	Nizhny Novgorod, Russia	Decision (Unaniomus)	3	3:00
2011-04-09	Win	(Russia) Vitaliy Shemetov	W5 Grand Prix K.O.	Moscow, Russia	RTD	1	
2011-03-27	Win	(Russia) Admir Dumanov		Blagoveshchensk, Russia	KO (Backfist)	2	
Wins WBKF Kickboxing Heavyweight European Championship.
2011-03-12	Win	(Morocco) Narjiss Abdeslam	Battle at Moscow 3	Moscow, Russia	KO	2	
2011-02-12	Win	(Belarus) Igor Bugaenko	W5 League	Moscow, Russia	Decision (Unaniomus)	3	3:00
2010-12-09	Loss	(Croatia) Igor Jurković	WFC 12: Proteini.si Showtime	Ljubljana, Slovenia	Ext. R. Dec.	4	3:00
2009-12-05	Win	(Belarus) Sergey Zelinskiy	Battle of Champions 4	Moscow, Russia	KO (Left Hook)	1	
Wins vacant WAKO Pro K-1 rules Super Heavyweight World Title +94.2 kg.
2009-09-16	Loss	(Suriname) Ashwin Balrak	Tatneft Arena European Cup 2009 1/2 final (+80 kg)	Kazan, Russia	Decision (Unanimous)	4	3:00
2009-04-16	Win	(Czech Republic) Pavel Majer	Tatneft Arena European Cup 2009 1st selection 1/4 final (+80 kg)	Kazan, Russia	Decision (Unanimous)	4	3:00
2009-02-19	Win	(Ukraine) Sergei Lascenko	Tatneft Cup 2009 4th selection for 1/8 final	Kazan, Russia	Decision	3	3:00
Legend: Win Loss Draw/No contest Notes

Amateur record
Date	Result	Opponent	Event	Location	Method	Round	Time
2013-08-	Loss	(Russia) Artem Vakhitov	2013 IFMA Russian Championships, Final	Kemerovo, Russia	TKO (broken nose)		
Wins the 2013 IFMA Russian Championships -91 kg/200 lb Silver Medal.
2013-07-28	Loss	(Belarus) Dzianis Hancharonak	2013 IFMA European Championship, Final	Lisbon, Portugal	Decision	4	2:00
Wins 2013 IFMA European Championships -91kg Silver Medal.
2013-07-27	Win	(Ukraine) Oleg Pryimachov	2013 IFMA European Championship, Semifinal	Lisbon, Portugal	Decision	4	2:00
2013-07-25	Win		2013 IFMA European Championship, Quarterfinal	Lisbon, Portugal	Decision (Unanimous)	4	2:00
2012-11	Win	(Lithuania) Sergej Maslobojev	W.A.K.O European Championships 2012, K-1 Final -91 kg	Ankara, Turkey			
Wins W.A.K.O. European Championship '12 K-1 Gold Medal -91 kg.
2012-11	Win	(Poland) Lukasz Butkiewicz	W.A.K.O European Championships 2012, K-1 Semi Finals -91 kg	Ankara, Turkey	KO		
2012-10	Win	(Croatia) Petar Jukić	W.A.K.O European Championships 2012, K-1 Quarter Finals -91 kg	Ankara, Turkey	Decision (Unanimous)	3	2:00
2011-10	Loss	(Serbia) Nenad Pagonis	W.A.K.O World Championships 2011, K-1 Semi Finals -91 kg	Skopje, Macedonia	Decision (Unanimous)	3	2:00
Wins W.A.K.O. World Championship '11 K-1 Bronze Medal -91 kg.
2009-10	Loss	(Poland) Izu Ugonoh	W.A.K.O World Championships 2009, K-1 Final -91 kg kg	Villach, Austria			
Wins W.A.K.O. World Championship '09 K-1 Silver Medal + 91 kg kg.
2009-10	Win	(Brazil) Saulo Cavalari	W.A.K.O World Championships 2009, K-1 Semi Finals -91 kg kg	Villach, Austria			
2008-11	Win	(Slovakia) Lukas Horak	W.A.K.O European Championships 2008, K-1 Final -91 kg	Porto, Portugal	KO		
Wins W.A.K.O. European Championship '08 K-1 Gold Medal -91 kg.
2008-11	Win	(Spain) Frank Muñoz	W.A.K.O European Championships 2008, K-1 Semi Finals -91 kg	Porto, Portugal	Decision (Unanimous)	3	2:00
2008-11	Win	(Bosnia and Herzegovina) Muamer Tufekčić	W.A.K.O European Championships 2008, K-1 Quarter Finals -91 kg	Porto, Portugal	Decision (Unanimous)	3	2:00
Legend: Win Loss Draw/No contest Notes

== Professional boxing record ==
1 fight	1 win	0 losses
By decision	1	0

No.	Result	Record	Opponent	Type	Round, time	Date	Location	Notes
1	Win	1–0	Magomed Ismailov	UD	8	7 Jul 2024	Moscow, Russia	

== See also ==
- List of WAKO Amateur World Championships
- List of WAKO Amateur European Championships
- List of male kickboxers
