= Petr Romankevich =

Пётр Романкевич
- Born: June 24, 1990 (age 36); Minsk, Byelorussian SSR, Soviet Union
- Nationality: Belarus
- Height: 1.95 m (6 ft 5 in)
- Weight: 107.3 kg (237 lb; 16.90 st)
- Division: Heavyweight
- Style: Kickboxing
- Stance: Orthodox
- Fighting out of: Minsk, Belarus

Kickboxing record
- Total: 43
- Wins: 33
- By knockout: 13
- Losses: 10

Petr Romankevich (born June 24, 1990) is a Belarusian professional kickboxer, currently competing in the heavyweight division of GLORY.

== Career ==
Romankevich faced Donegi Abena on March 3, 2016, in the quarterfinals of the 2016 Tatneft Cup. He won the fight by an extra round decision.

In the 2016 WLF Super Heavyweight Tournament, held on December 3, 2016, Romankevich rematched Donegi Abena in the quarterfinals and lost by decision.

Romankevich participated in the 2017 Tatneft Cup selection tournament. In the second round he defeated Mladen Kujundžić by decision.

== Championships and accomplishments ==
=== Professional ===
- Tatneft Cup
  - Tatneft Cup 2019 (+80 kg) World Tournament Champion
  - Tatneft Cup 2017 (+80 kg) World Tournament Runner-up
- World Total Combat Federation
  - WTKF Heavyweight World Championship (two defenses)
- DSF Kickboxing Challenge
  - DSF Heavyweight (+91 kg) World Championship (two defenses)
- Yangame’s Fight Night
  - 2015 Yangame's Fight Night 3 Heavyweight Tournament Champion

=== Amateur ===
- World Association of Kickboxing Organizations
  - 2018 W.A.K.O. European Championships K-1 (bronze) +91 kg

== Kickboxing record ==
Kickboxing Record
33 wins (13 KOs), 10 losses
Date	Result	Opponent	Event	Location	Method	Round	Time
2026-02-21	Win	(Russia) Mukhammad Manapov	MFP 265	Minsk, Belarus	TKO		
2025-04-05	Loss	(Albania) Luigj Gashi	Glory 99 - Last Heavyweight Standing, Opening Round	Rotterdam, Netherlands	Decision (Unanimous)	3	3:00
2024-11-18	Loss	(Russia) Sergey Veselkin	RCC 20	Yekaterinburg, Russia	KO (Right cross)	1	2:50
2023-07-22	Loss	(Belarus) Fedor Koltun	Nashe Delo Fights	Russia	KO (Right cross)	1	2:38
2023-05-13	Loss	(Russia) Ivan Shtyrkov	RCC 15	Yekaterinburg, Russia	Decision (Unanimous)	4	3:00
2023-02-17	Win	(Brazil) Saulo Cavalari	REN TV Fight Club	Minsk, Belarus	KO (Knee)	2	
2021-10-02	Loss	(Germany) Danyo Ilunga	Steko’s Fight Club	Germany	Decision	5	3:00
2021-06-12	Win	(Russia) Daniil Shatalov	M1 Fight Night	Belarus	Decision	3	3:00
2021-04-17	Win	(Turkey) Fatih Mehmet Karakuş	WTKF Grand Prix	Minsk, Belarus	TKO (retirement)	3	0:12
Defended the WTKF Heavyweight World title.
2020-05-31	Win	(Belarus) Fedor Koltun	WTKF Grand Prix Finals	Minsk, Belarus	Decision	3	3:00
Defended the WTKF Heavyweight World title.
2020-02-23	Win	(Russia) Semyon Shelepov	WTKF Tournament 5	Belarus	Decision (unanimous)	3	3:00
Wins the WTKF Heavyweight World title.
2019-12-15	Win	(Albania) Françesko Xhaja	2019 Tatneft Cup, +80 kg Tournament Final	Kazan, Russia	Ext.R Decision	4	3:00
Wins Tatneft Arena World Cup 2019 (+80 kg) title.
2019-10-04	Win	(Italy) Claudio Istrate	2019 Tatneft Cup, +80 kg Tournament Semifinals	Kazan, Russia	KO (Low kicks)	2	1:19
2019-08-24	Win	(Russia) Yan Petrovich	2019 Tatneft Cup, +80 kg Tournament Quarterfinals	Kazan, Russia	KO (Low kicks)	3	
2019-05-26	Win	(Russia) Viktor Vecherin	2019 Tatneft Cup, +80 kg Tournament 1st Round	Kazan, Russia	TKO (Low kicks)	4	1:18
2018-12-08	Loss	(Poland) Tomasz Sarara	DSF Kickboxing Challenge 18	Ząbki, Poland	KO (High kick)	4	0:59
Loses the DSF Heavyweight (+91kg) World title.
2018-09-15	Win	(Ukraine) Yurii Gorbenko	Royal Fight 4	Minsk, Belarus	KO (High kick)	2	
2018-07-26	Loss	(Czech Republic) Tomáš Hron	Yangames Fight Night	Prague, Czech Republic	KO	4	
2018-04-13	Win	(Poland) Dawid Żółtaszek	DSF Kickboxing Challenge 14	Warsaw, Poland	KO (High kicks)	3	
Defended the DSF Heavyweight (+91kg) World title.
2017-12-14	Loss	(Russia) Turpal Tokaev	2017 Tatneft Cup, +80 kg Tournament Final	Kazan, Russia	Decision (Unanimous)	4	3:00
2017-12-09	Win	(Cameroon) Daniel Lentie	DSF Kickboxing Challenge 12	Warsaw, Poland	Decision	5	3:00
Defended the DSF Heavyweight (+91kg) World title.
2017-10-27	Win	(Italy) Claudio Istrate	2017 Tatneft Cup, +80 kg Tournament Semifinals	Kazan, Russia	Decision	4	3:00
2017-07-19	Win	(Croatia) Mladen Kujundžić	2017 Tatneft Cup, +80 kg Tournament Quarterfinals	Kazan, Russia	Decision	4	3:00
2017-06-23	Win	(Poland) Michał Turyński	DSF Kickboxing Challenge 10	Poland	Decision	5	3:00
Wins the DSF Heavyweight (+91kg) World title.
2017-04-22	Win	(Russia) Alexey Savchuk	2017 Tatneft Cup, +80 kg Tournament 1st Round	Kazan, Russia	TKO	1	
2017-07-15	Win	(China) Jiao Weichao	Kunlun Fight 64	China	KO	1	
2016-12-03	Loss	(Suriname) Donegi Abena	Wu Lin Feng 2016: WLF x Krush - China vs Japan	Zhengzhou, China	Decision	3	3:00
2016-03-06	Win	(Suriname) Donegi Abena	2016 Tatneft Cup, +80 kg Tournament 1st Round	Kazan, Russia	Decision	4	3:00
2016-01-08	Win	(China) Xu Jiaheng	WMA Championship	Japan	Decision	3	3:00
2015-07-30	Win	(Czech Republic) Jiří Havránek	Yangame's Fight Night 3, Final	Prague, Czech Republic	TKO		
Wins Yangame's Fight Night 3 Heavyweight Tournament Championship
2015-07-30	Win	(Czech Republic) Michal Janáček	Yangame's Fight Night 3, Semi Finals	Prague, Czech Republic	KO		
2015-07-30	Win	(Slovakia) Martin Hauser	Yangame's Fight Night 3, Quarter Finals	Prague, Czech Republic	Decision (Unanimous)	3	3:00
2013-08-31	Win	(Russia) Artyom Tarvid	King Fights	Moscow, Russia	Decision	3	3:00
2013-02-23	Loss	(Ukraine) Serhiy Papusha	2013 Tatneft Cup, +80 kg Tournament 1st Round	Kazan, Russia	Decision (Unanimous)	3	3:00
2012	Win	(Russia) Nikolay Belozertsev	K1 Federation Russia	Russia	Decision	3	3:00
2011-09-10	Win	(Turkey) Muzaffer Gemiçi	Battle Show	Minsk, Belarus	KO	3	
Legend: Win Loss Draw/No contest Notes

Amateur kickboxing record
Date	Result	Opponent	Event	Location	Method	Round	Time
2018-10-19	Loss	(Croatia) Antonio Plazibat	W.A.K.O European Championships 2018, K-1 Semi Finals +91 kg	Bratislava, Slovakia	Decision (Split)	3	2:00
Wins W.A.K.O. European Championship '18 K-1 Bronze Medal +91 kg.
Legend: Win Loss Draw/No contest Notes

== See also ==
- List of male kickboxers
