= Sergej Maslobojev =

Lithuanian boxer and mixed martial artist

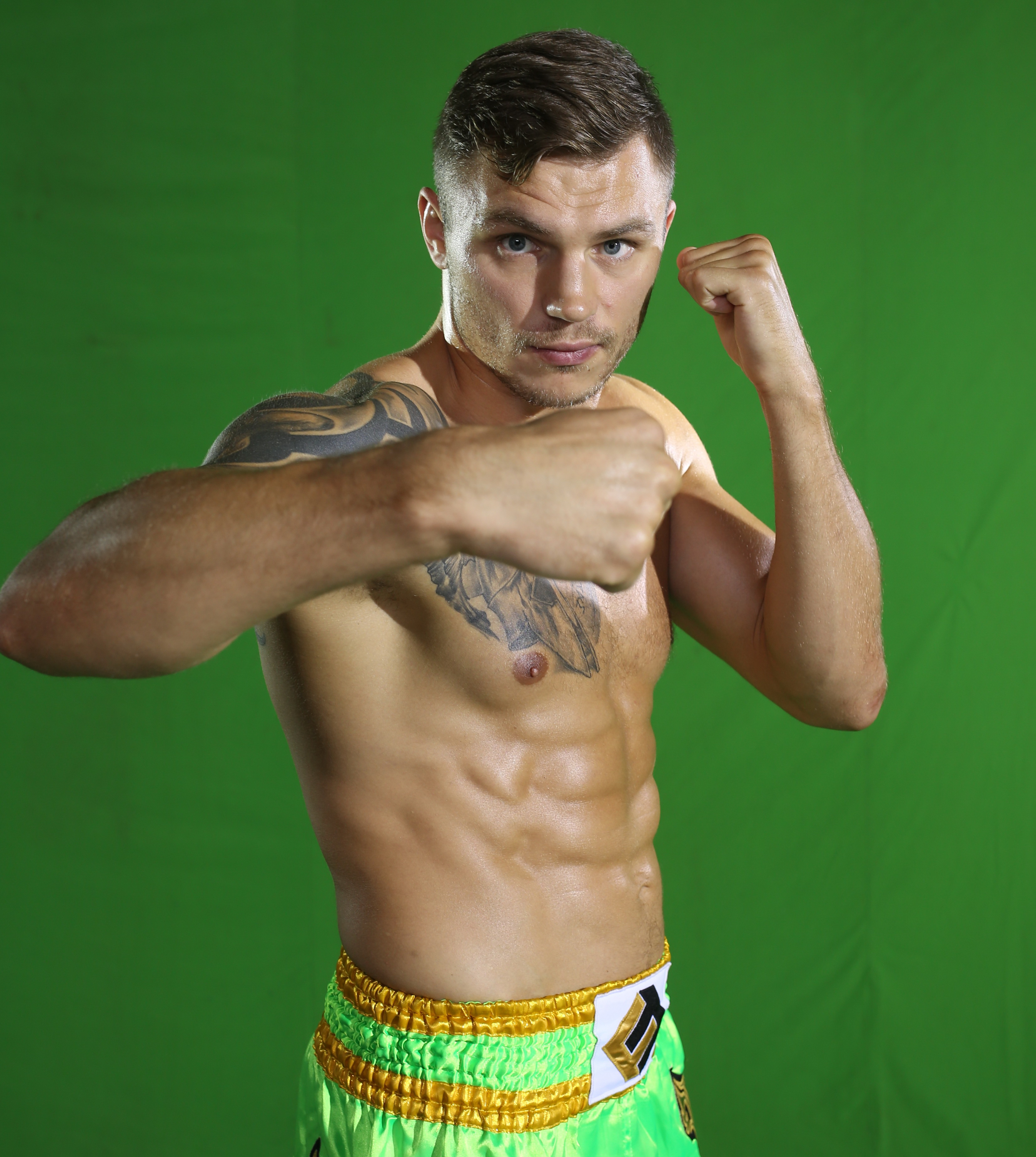
- Sergej Maslobojev
- Born: Sergej Maslobojev; 22 May 1987 (age 39); Klaipėda, Lithuania
- Other names: Kuvalda (Sledgehammer)
- Height: 1.89 m (6 ft 2 in)
- Weight: 95 kg (209 lb; 14 st 13 lb)
- Division: Cruiserweight; Heavyweight
- Stance: Orthodox
- Fighting out of: Vilnius, Lithuania
- Team: Sparta Fight Gym

Professional boxing record
- Total: 10
- Wins: 7
- By knockout: 3
- Losses: 3

Kickboxing record
- Total: 54
- Wins: 45
- By knockout: 29
- Losses: 8
- By knockout: 4
- No contests: 1

Mixed martial arts record
- Total: 17
- Wins: 11
- By knockout: 4
- By submission: 6
- By decision: 1
- Losses: 6
- By knockout: 1
- By submission: 4
- By disqualification: 1

Other information
- Boxing record from BoxRec
- Mixed martial arts record from Sherdog

Sergej Maslobojev (born 22 May 1987) is a Lithuanian kickboxer, former boxer and mixed martial artist. He is the former Glory Light Heavyweight Champion. Maslobojev was ranked as the best light heavyweight in the world by Combat Press.

== Personal life ==
Maslobojev saw kickboxing when he was a child, but only started training at the age of 18. He was impressed by Mirko Filipović, Wanderlei Silva and Remigijus Morkevičius.

He is a professional kickboxer and fights out of Sparta Fight Gym in Vilnius, Lithuania. In 2018 Sergej opened a brand new gym named Champions House. He now has his own brand "Kuvalda Team". He regularly participates in various charity, being also a member of UNICEF. He undertakes training seminars for members of the Lithuanian Armed Forces.

Maslobojev calls himself "a huge Dragonball Z nerd."

== Kickboxing career ==
=== Early career ===
Maslobojev made his professional debut against Steve Hooper in May 2007, when the two fought for the WKA Heavyweight Championship. The fight went into the tenth round, after which Sergej won by knockout. In his next fight, Maslobojev won the Baltic Muay Thai Light Heavyweight title, with a decision win over Kristaps Zile. After defeating Ricardo van den Bos, he entered the 2011 KOK European Heavyweight Grand Prix. He scored a first-round knockout of Vasile Popovici in the quarterfinal and a third-round knockout of Martynas Knyzelis in the semifinal, and faced Mindaugas Sakalauskas in the finals. Maslobojev beat Sakalauskas by knockout in the fifth round.

Maslobojev went on a 2–2 run over his next four fights, before challenging the reigning WKN Heavyweight champion Vladimir Mineev at Fight Nights: Battle of Moscow 15. Mineev won the fight by majority decision.

==== King of Kings ====
For his next fight, Maslobojev was scheduled to fight Lukasz Butkiewicz, at the KOK World GP 2014 in Gdańsk. He won the fight by a second-round knockout. He followed this up with a fight against Pavel Voronin, whom he beat by knockout as well. He would go on to win four of his next five fights, losing only to Roman Kryklia, before fighting Robert Dorin for the KOK Heavyweight Championship. Sergej won the fight by unanimous decision.

After winning the KOK title, Maslobojev went on an eight fight, two year winning streak, during which he earned decision wins over Gokhan Gedik, Oleg Pryimachov and Thomas Bridgewater, as well as stoppage wins over Antonio Plazibat, Chaiyo Sitteacherjulun, Stanislav Voytenko, Carlos Ulberg and Bruno Susano. This run culminated in a title fight with Stéphane Susperregui for the WAKO World K-1 Heavyweight title. Maslobojev won by a fourth-round TKO, after Susperregui's corner was forced to throw in the towel. This winning streak was ended by Ondrej Hutnik at Yangames Fight Night 5, when the two of them fought for the WKN European Oriental Rules heavyweight title, with Hutnik winning a majority decision.

In his next fight, Maslobojev was scheduled to fight Petros Vardakas. Maslobojev knocked Vardakas out in the second round.

==== ONE Championship ====
Following a TKO victory against Noureddine Ajnaou at KOK`55 World Series, Maslobojev signed with ONE Championship. He made his organizational debut at |ONE Championship: Grit and Glory, in a rematch with Antonio Plazibat. Maslobojev won the rematch by unanimous decision. In his second fight with ONE, he fought Florent Kaouachi at ONE Championship: Pursuit of Power, and won by unanimous decision.

Moving away from ONE Championship, Maslobojev earned a unanimous decision against Rafael de Souza and a stoppage win against Fraser Weightman.

=== GLORY ===
In the second part of 2019, Maslobojev signed with GLORY. He was scheduled to make his debut against John King at Glory 68. King later withdrew, and Maslobojev was rescheduled to fight Bahram Rajabzadeh at Glory 69: Düsseldorf. He won the fight by unanimous decision.

Maslobojev was next scheduled to fight a rematch with Fraser Weightman at Glory 73. The fight fell through, as Weightman was unable to gain a visa to fight in China. He was next set to face the K-1 heavyweight champion Roel Mannaart at Glory 75: Utrecht. Sergej won the fight by TKO, breaking Roel's jaw in the first round.

Maslobojev was scheduled to fight Luis Tavares at Glory 78: Arnhem. He later withdrew from the bout with an injury.

Maslobojev was scheduled to face Donegi Abena at Glory: Collision 3 on 23 October 2021. He won the fight by split decision.

Maslobojev was scheduled to face Olivier Langlois-Ross at KoK Mega Battle on 20 November 2021. He won the fight by unanimous decision.

Maslobojev was booked to face Nika Kulumbegashvili at KOK 99 Mega Series on 19 March 2022. He won the fight by unanimous decision.

==== GLORY Light heavyweight champion ====
Maslobojev was expected to face the #1 ranked Glory light heavyweight contender Luis Tavares for the vacant Glory Light Heavyweight Championship at Glory 81: Ben Saddik vs. Adegbuy 2 on 20 August 2022. The fight was cancelled on 10 August 2022, due to "reasons on the part of Tavares". Later that day, it was revealed that Tavares had tested positive for performance enhancing drugs. Maslobojev was instead scheduled to face Tarik Khbabez for the vacant title. Maslobojev won the fight by split decision.

Maslobojev made his first title defense against the one-time Glory light heavyweight title challenger Donegi Abena at Glory 83 on February 11, 2023. He lost the fight by a fourth-round technical knockout. The ringside physician stopped the fight due to a cut on Maslobojev's right shin.

Maslobojev faced Rhys Brudenell at KOK 117 Mega Series in Vilnius. He won the fight by first-round knockout.

Maslobojev faced Bogdan Stoica in the quarterfinals of the Glory Light Heavyweight Grand Prix, held on June 8, 2024, in Rotterdam, Netherlands. He won the fight by a first-round technical knockout. Maslobojev next faced Bahram Rajabzadeh in semifinals of the one-day tournament. He retired from the contest 20 seconds into the second round, after a headbutt from Rajabzadeh left him with a cut on his chin.

Maslobojev faced Mohammed Hamdi at UTMA #9 on September 28, 2024. He won the fight by unanimous decision.

Maslobojev faced Ștefan Lătescu at Glory Collision 7 on December 7, 2024. He won the fight by unanimous decision.

Maslobojev faced Jimmy Livinus at UTMA #11 on February 22, 2025. He won the fight by a second-round knockout.

Maslobojev challenged the Glory Light Heavyweight champion Tarik Khbabez at Glory 100 on June 14, 2025. He won the fight by a fourth-round technical knockout.

==== Failed drug test ====
On August 26, 2025, Maslobojev vacated the Glory Light Heavyweight Championship following positive tests to a metabolite of stanozolol on two samples - collected out-of-competition and in-competition - coming from Tarik Khbabez fight which took place at Glory 100 on June 14, 2025. He received a 12-month suspension beginning on 14 June 2025.

UTMA

Maslobojev faced Alexandru Burduja at UTMA #16 on January 31, 2026. He won the fight by a first-round technical knockout.

Maslobojev faced Ignas Pauliukevičius at UTMA #18 on April 18, 2026. He won 3–0 by a unanimous decision.

== Titles and accomplishments ==
=== Kickboxing ===
==== Professional ====
- World Kickboxing Association
  - 2007 WKA Kickboxing World Heavyweight Champion
- Baltic Muay Thai Federation
  - 2009 Baltic Light Heavyweight Champion
- King of Kings
  - 2011 KOK European Heavyweight Grand Prix winner
  - 2015 KOK Light Heavyweight Champion
- European Union of Martial Sports
  - 2015 EUMS Kickboxing Light Heavyweight World Champion
- World Association of Kickboxing Organizations
  - 2017 WAKO Pro K-1 World Light Heavyweight Champion
- Glory
  - 2022 Glory Light Heavyweight Championship
  - 2022 Fight of the Year (vs. Tarik Khbabez at Glory Collision 4)

==== Amateur ====
- World Association of Kickboxing Organizations
  - 2012 WAKO European Championship K-1 -91 kg (silver)
  - 2013 Polish Kickboxing Open K-1 -91 kg (gold)
  - 2013 WAKO World Championship K-1 -91 kg (gold)
  - 2014 WAKO European Championship K-1 -91 kg (gold)
  - 2019 WAKO World Championship K-1 -91 kg (gold)
- World Amateur K-1 Federation
  - 2018 WAK-1F World Championship K-1 -91 kg (gold)

=== Boxing ===
- 2012 Bigger's Better 17 Heavyweight Tournament winner
- 2013 Bigger's Better 26 Heavyweight Tournament winner

== Kickboxing record ==
Professional kickboxing record
45 wins (29 (T)KOs), 8 losses (4 (T)KOs), 1 no contest
Date	Result	Opponent	Event	Location	Method	Round	Time
2026-09-26	Win	(Lithuania) Dominykas Dirkstys	UTMA #19	Kaunas, Lithuania	TKO (injury)	2	
2026-04-18	Win	(Lithuania) Ignas Pauliukevičius	UTMA #18	Kaunas, Lithuania	Decision (unanimous)	3	3:00
2026-01-31	Win	(Moldova) Alexandru Burduja	UTMA #16	Vilnius, Lithuania	TKO (retirement)	1	3:00
2025-06-14	NC	(Morocco) Tarik Khbabez	Glory 100	Rotterdam, Netherlands	NC (overturned)	4	2:06
For the Glory Light Heavyweight Championship. Originally a TKO win for Maslobojev; overturned after he tested positive for a metabolite of stanozolol.
2025-02-22	Win	(Netherlands) Jimmy Livinus	UTMA #11	Kaunas, Lithuania	KO (punches)	2	1:10
2024-12-07	Win	(Romania) Ștefan Lătescu	Glory Collision 7	Arnhem, Netherlands	Decision (unanimous)	3	3:00
2024-09-28	Win	(Morocco) Mohammed Hamdi	UTMA #9	Kaunas, Lithuania	Decision (unanimous)	3	3:00
2024-06-08	Loss	(Azerbaijan) Bahram Rajabzadeh	Glory Light Heavyweight Grand Prix, Semifinals	Rotterdam, Netherlands	TKO (retirement)	2	0:20
2024-06-08	Win	(Romania) Bogdan Stoica	Glory Light Heavyweight Grand Prix, Quarterfinals	Rotterdam, Netherlands	TKO (arm injury)	1	
2024-03-16	Win	(Suriname) Leandro Dikmoet	KOK 120 Mega Series	Vilnius, Lithuania	TKO (punches)	2	
2023-11-18	Win	(United Kingdom) Rhys Brudenell	KOK 117 Mega Series	Vilnius, Lithuania	KO (punches)	1	0:35
2023-02-11	Loss	(Suriname) Donegi Abena	Glory 83	Essen, Germany	TKO (doctor stoppage)	4	2:15
Loses the Glory Light Heavyweight Championship.
2022-10-08	Win	(Morocco) Tarik Khbabez	Glory: Collision 4	Arnhem, Netherlands	Decision (split)	5	3:00
Wins the vacant Glory Light Heavyweight Championship
2022-03-19	Win	(Georgia (country)) Nika Kulumbegashvili	KOK 99 Mega Series	Vilnius, Lithuania	Decision (unanimous)	3	3:00
2021-11-20	Win	(Canada) Olivier Langlois-Ross	KOK 96 Mega Series	Vilnius, Lithuania	Decision (unanimous)	3	3:00
2021-10-23	Win	(Suriname) Donegi Abena	Glory: Collision 3	Arnhem, Netherlands	Decision (split)	3	3:00
2020-02-29	Win	(Netherlands) Roel Mannaart	Glory 75: Utrecht	Utrecht, Netherlands	TKO (punches)	1	1:48
2019-10-12	Win	(Azerbaijan) Bahram Rajabzadeh	Glory 69: Düsseldorf	Düsseldorf, Germany	Decision (unanimous)	3	3:00
2019-03-16	Win	(United Kingdom) Fraser Weightman	KOK`69 World Series	Vilnius, Lithuania	KO (left hook)	2	2:28
2018-11-17	Win	(Brazil) Rafael de Souza	KOK Hero's World Series 2018	Vilnius, Lithuania	Decision (unanimous)	3	3:00
2018-07-13	Win	(Algeria) Florent Kaouachi	ONE Championship: Pursuit of Power	Kuala Lumpur, Malaysia	Decision (unanimous)	3	3:00
2018-05-12	Win	(Croatia) Antonio Plazibat	ONE Championship: Grit and Glory	Jakarta, Indonesia	Decision (unanimous)	3	3:00
2018-03-17	Win	(Morocco) Noureddine Ajnaou	KOK`55 World Series	Vilnius, Lithuania	TKO (doctor stoppage)	1	1:36
2017-11-18	Win	(Greece) Petros Vardakas	FightBOX KOK Hero's World Series	Vilnius, Lithuania	TKO (3 knockdowns)	2	1:24
2017-07-27	Loss	(Czech Republic) Ondrej Hutnik	Yangames Fight Night 5	Prague, Czech Republic	Decision (majority)	3	
For the WKN European Oriental Rules Heavyweight Championship 96.6 kg.
2017-06-30	Win	(France) Stéphane Susperregui	Monte Carlo Fighting Masters	Monte Carlo, Monaco	TKO (corner stoppage)	4	
Wins W.A.K.O. Pro World K1 Rules Cruiser Heavyweight Championship -94.1 kg.
2017-03-18	Win	(Netherlands) Thomas Bridgewater	KOK'45 WORLD GP 2017 IN VILNIUS	Vilnius, Lithuania	Decision (majority)	4	3:00
2016-11-19	Win	(Portugal) Bruno Susano	KOK Hero's World Series In Vilnius	Vilnius, Lithuania	TKO (referee stop./punches)	2	1:49
2016-09-23	Win	(New Zealand) Carlos Ulberg	EM Legend 12	Chengdu, China	TKO (low kicks)	3	2:31
2016-08-27	Win	(Ukraine) Stanislav Voytenko	Faith Fight Championship	Guangzhou, China	KO (left hook to the body)	2	1:00
2016-08-07	Win	(Thailand) Chaiyo Sitteacherjulun	Chalong Boxing Stadium Fight Night	Phuket, Thailand	KO (left hook)	3	1:59
2016-06-25	Win	(Ukraine) Oleg Pryimachov	FF fighting championship	Shenzhen, China	Decision (unanimous)	3	3:00
2016-03-19	Win	(Turkey) Gokhan Gedik	KOK World GP 2016 In Vilnius	Vilnius, Lithuania	Decision (unanimous)	3	3:00
2016-02-19	Win	(Croatia) Antonio Plazibat	FFC22: Athens	Athens, Greece	TKO (doctor stoppage)	2	3:00
2015-11-14	Win	(Romania) Robert Dorin	KOK World GP 2015 In Vilnius - Heavyweight Tournament Final	Vilnius, Lithuania	Decision (unanimous)	5	3:00
Wins the KOK World -93 kg Championship.
2015-08-15	Win	(Poland) Patryk Szychovski	Baltic Summer Fight	Liepāja	TKO	2	1:15
2015-06-07	Loss	(Ukraine) Roman Kryklia	Kunlun Fight 26 - Super Heavyweight Tournament, Reserve Fight	Chongqing, China	KO (left hook)	3	2:56
2015-05-15	Win	(Thailand) Kwantong Lion MuayThai	Bangla Boxing Stadium	Phuket, Thailand	KO	1	0:37
2015-03-14	Win	(Poland) Kryspin Kalski	KOK World GP 2015 in Vilnius, Semifinals	Vilnius, Lithuania	TKO	1	2:10
2015-02-23	Win	(Czech Republic) Petr Kareš	Noc Mistrů 9	Prague, Czech Republic	TKO	4	2:47
For European Union of Martial Sports Kickboxing Light Heavyweight World Championship -88.6 kg.
2014-11-15	Win	(Moldova) Pavel Voronin	Bushido Series - Hero's KOK -91 kg	Vilnius, Lithuania	KO (left uppercut)	2	
2014-10-17	Win	(Poland) Lukasz Butkiewicz	KOK World GP 2014 in Gdańsk	Gdańsk, Poland	TKO	2	1:09
2014-03-28	Loss	(Russia) Vladimir Mineev	Fight Nights: Battle of Moscow 15	Moscow, Russia	Decision (majority)	5	3:00
For WKN Kickboxing Heavyweight World Championship -96.6 kg.
2014-02-23	Win	(Lithuania) Martynas Knyzelis	Big Fight	Kaunas, Lithuania	TKO	2	N/A
2013-03-30	Loss	(France) Nicolas Wamba		Agde, France	Decision	5	2:00
2012-03-23	Loss	(Turkey) Ali Cenik	United Glory 15	Moscow, Russia	Decision	3	3:00
2012-01-20	Win	(Latvia) Janis Ginters	Fight night in Klaipėda	Klaipėda, Lithuania	Decision		
2011-03-19	Win	(Lithuania) Mindaugas Sakalauskas	KING OF KINGS EUROPE GP 2011 IN VILNIUS, Final	Vilnius, Lithuania	KO (punches)	5	1:48
Won KOK K-1 Europe GP 2011 in Vilnius Heavyweight Championship.
2011-03-19	Win	(Lithuania) Martynas Knyzelis	KING OF KINGS EUROPE GP 2011 IN VILNIUS, Semifinals	Vilnius, Lithuania	KO (right straight)	3	N/A
2011-03-19	Win	(Romania) Vasile Popovici	KING OF KINGS EUROPE GP 2011 IN VILNIUS, Quarterfinals	Vilnius, Lithuania	KO (right hook)	1	0:11
2010-04-10	Loss	(Estonia) Andrei Bokan	K-1 WORLD GP 2010 in Vilnius Semifinal	Vilnius, Lithuania	TKO		
2010-04-10	Win	(Netherlands) Ricardo van den Bos	K-1 WORLD GP 2010 in Vilnius Quarterfinal	Vilnius, Lithuania	Decision	3	3:00
2009-10-24	Win	(Latvia) Kristaps Zile	K-1 EJSL	Riga, Latvia	Decision	5	3:00
Won Baltic Muay Thai Light Heavyweight Championship.
2007-05-26	Win	(England) Steve Hooper	W.K.A	England	KO	10	2:10
Won WKA Heavyweight Championship.

=== Amateur record ===
Amateur kickboxing record
Date	Result	Opponent	Event	Location	Method	Round	Time
2019-10-27	Win	(Ukraine) Roman Shcherbatiuk	W.A.K.O World Championships 2019, K-1 Final -91 kg	Sarajevo, Bosnia and Herzegovina	Decision	3	2:00
Wins W.A.K.O. World Championship '19 K-1 Gold Medal -91 kg.
2019-10-25	Win	(Turkey) Cemil Yildrim	W.A.K.O World Championships 2019, K-1 Semi Final -91 kg	Sarajevo, Bosnia and Herzegovina	Decision	3	2:00
2019-10-24	Win	(Croatia) Toni Capitovic	W.A.K.O World Championships 2019, K-1 Quarter Finals -91 kg	Sarajevo, Bosnia and Herzegovina	Decision	3	2:00
2019-10-	Win	(Slovakia) Adrian Bartl	W.A.K.O World Championships 2019, K-1 Round of 16 –91 kg	Sarajevo, Bosnia and Herzegovina	Decision	3	2:00
2018-10-07	Win	(Moldova) Jaroslav Linic	WAK-1F, K-1 Final +91 kg	Riga, Latvia	KO (injury)	1	00:50
Wins World Amateur K-1 Federation WORLD Championship '18 K-1 Gold Medal +91 kg.
2018-10-06	Win	(Russia) Karapetyan Markos	WAK-1F, K-1 Semi-Final +91 kg	Riga, Latvia	TKO (injury)	1	00:00
2014-10	Win	(Czech Republic) Petr Kares	W.A.K.O European Championships 2014, K-1 Final -91 kg	Bilbao, Spain	Decision (unanimous)	3	2:00
Wins W.A.K.O. European Championship '14 K-1 Gold Medal -91 kg.
2014-10	Win	(Belarus) Piotr Ramankevich	W.A.K.O European Championships 2014, K-1 Semifinals -91 kg	Bilbao, Spain	Decision (unanimous)	3	2:00
2014-10-23	Win	(Serbia) Bojan Džepina	W.A.K.O European Championships 2014, K-1 Quarterfinals -91 kg	Bilbao, Spain	TKO (cut)	3	
2014-05-03	Loss	(Belarus) Dzianis Hancharonak	2014 IFMA World Championships -91 kg	Langkawi, Malaysia	TKO (injury)		
2013-10	Win	(Brazil) Alex Pereira	W.A.K.O World Championships 2013, K-1 Final -91 kg	Guaruja, Brasil	Decision		
Wins W.A.K.O. World Championship '13 K-1 Gold Medal -91 kg.
2013-10	Win	(Russia) Andrey Khlynovskii	W.A.K.O World Championships 2013, K-1 Semifinals -91 kg	Guaruja, Brasil			
2013-10	Win	(Czech Republic) Petr Kares	W.A.K.O World Championships 2013, K-1 Quarterfinals -91 kg	Guaruja, Brasil			
2013-04-25	Win	(Lithuania) Mindaugas Sakalauskas	Vilnius Open 2013	Vilnius, Lithuania	Decision	3	3:00
2013-04-14	Win	(Poland) Tomasz Klimiuk	Kickboxing Championships in Poland, K-1 Final +91 kg	Starachowice, Poland	TKO	2	
Wins Poland K-1 Kickboxing Championship +91 kg.
2013-04-13	Win	(Poland) Wojciech Jastrzepski	Kickboxing Championships in Poland, K-1 Semifinals +91 kg	Starachowice, Poland			
2013-04-13	Win	(Poland) Maciej Medynski	Kickboxing Championships in Poland, K-1 Quarterfinals +91 kg	Starachowice, Poland			
2012-11	Loss	(Russia) Vladimir Mineev	W.A.K.O European Championships 2012, K-1 Final -91 kg	Ankara, Turkey	TKO (injury)	1	0:00
Wins W.A.K.O. European Championship '12 K-1 Silver Medal -91 kg.
2012-11	Win	(Azerbaijan) Anar Mammadov	W.A.K.O European Championships 2012, K-1 Semifinals -91 kg	Ankara, Turkey	KO		
2012-11	Win	(Czech Republic) Petr Kares	W.A.K.O European Championships 2012, K-1 Quarterfinals -91 kg	Ankara, Turkey	Decision	3	2:00
Legend: Win Loss Draw/no contest Notes

== Mixed martial arts record ==
Professional record breakdown
17 matches	11 wins	6 losses
By knockout	4	1
By submission	6	4
By decision	1	0
By disqualification	0	1

Res.	Record	Opponent	Method	Event	Date	Round	Time	Location	Notes
Win	11–6	Nicolai Garbuz	TKO (punches)	MMA Bushido 77	3 May 2019	1	N/A	Vilnius, Lithuania	Light Heavyweight bout.
Win	10–6	Alexei Gureev	KO (punch)	Verdict FC 1	11 February 2012	1	3:44	Moscow, Russia	
Win	9–6	Rimgaudas Kutkaitis	Submission (armbar)	Real Fights League 6	18 October 2009	1	1:24	Vilnius, Lithuania	
Win	8–6	Valdas Pocevicius	Decision (unanimous)	Real Fights League 6	18 October 2009	3	5:00	Vilnius, Lithuania	
Loss	7–6	Jeff Monson	Submission (north-south choke)	Cage Wars 11	29 March 2009	2	1:30	Belfast, Northern Ireland	
Win	7–5	Colin Laird	KO (knee and punches)	Cage Rage Contenders: Ireland vs. Belgium	3 May 2008	1	N/A	Dublin, Ireland	
Win	6–5	Szilvester Silbont	Submission (rear-naked choke)	Cage FC 2	24 February 2008	1	3:48	London, England	
Win	5–5	Colin Sexton	Submission (heel hook)	Goshin Ryu 23	23 February 2008	1	3:20	Sunderland, England	
Loss	4–5	Bruno Carvalho	DQ (illegal kick)	The Zone FC 1	9 February 2008	3	1:30	Stockholm, Sweden	
Win	4–4	Tim McCrory	Submission (guillotine choke)	Money Power Respect 1	27 January 2008	1	1:36	England, United Kingdom	
Win	3–4	Dave Daubney	KO (knees)	Goshin Ryu 22	24 November 2007	1	2:09	Sunderland, England	
Win	2–4	Kevin Thompson	Submission (kimura)	War in Workington 4	11 August 2007	2	N/A	Workington, England	
Loss	1–4	Romualds Garkulis	Submission (armbar)	World Full Contact Association: Gladiators Fight 8	13 May 2007	N/A	N/A	Riga, Latvia	
Loss	1–3	Michael Ettl	Submission (armbar)	Cage Fight Series 1	28 April 2007	1	3:08	Graz, Austria	
Loss	1–2	Atte Backman	TKO	Fight Festival 18	13 May 2006	1	2:25	Helsinki, Finland	Heavyweight debut.
Loss	1–1	Andrejs Zozulja	Submission (guillotine choke)	World Full Contact Association: Gladiators Fight 5	23 April 2006	1	0:45	Riga, Latvia	
Win	1–0	Raymond Mihalyov	Submission (armbar)	World Full Contact Association: Gladiators Fight 2	5 February 2006	1	2:07	Riga, Latvia	Light Heavyweight debut.

== Professional boxing record ==
7 wins (3 knockouts, 4 decisions), 4 losses, 0 draws
Res.	Record	Opponent	Type	Rd., time	Date	Location	Notes
Loss	7–4	(Romania) Bogdan Dinu	TKO	3 (3)	2013-12-13	Lisbon, Portugal	Bigger's Better King: quarterfinal.
Win	7–3	(Belgium) Tambwe Djeko	KO	2 (2)	2013-11-22	Liepaja, Latvia	Bigger's Better 26: final.
Win	6–3	(Poland) Przemyslaw Stepien	TKO	2 (2)	2013-11-22	Liepaja, Latvia	Bigger's Better 26: semifinal.
Win	5–3	(Germany) Eugen Buchmuller	KO	2 (2)	2013-11-22	Liepaja, Latvia	Bigger's Better 26: quarterfinal.
Loss	4–3	(Latvia) Mairis Briedis	KO	2 (3)	2012-12-14	Riga, Latvia	Bigger's King: semifinal.
Win	4–2	(Russia) Konstantin Gluhov	UD	3 (3)	2012-12-14	Riga, Latvia	Bigger's Better King: quarterfinal.
Win	3–2	(Poland) Wojciech Jastrzebski	UD	3 (3)	2012-11-16	Andrichrow, Poland	Bigger's Better 17: final.
Win	2–2	(Germany) Konstantin Airich	SD	3 (3)	2012-11-16	Andrichrow, Poland	Bigger's Better 17: semifinal.
Win	1–2	(Germany) Alexej Mogylewskij	UD	3 (3)	2012-11-16	Andrichrow, Poland	Bigger's Better 17: quarterfinal.
Loss	0–2	(Russia) Konstantin Gluhov	SD	3 (3)	2012-05-25	Vilnius, Lithuania	Bigger's Better 12: quarterfinal.
Loss	0–1	(Romania) Constantin Bejenaru	UD	3 (3)	2011-09-23	Vilnius, Lithuania	Bigger's Better 7: quarterfinal.

== See also ==
- List of male kickboxers
