= Mike Passenier =

Martial arts trainer

- Born: Michael Percy Passenier; April 9, 1969 (age 57); Amsterdam, Netherlands
- Other names: Big Mike
- Team: Mike's Gym
- Years active: 2002–present

Other information
- Occupation: Kickboxing trainer

Michael Percy Passenier (born 9 April 1969) is a Dutch kickboxing trainer who owns Mike's Gym in Oostzaan. He is also known by the nickname "Big Mike".

== Biography ==
Passenier was born in Amsterdam to a Dutch mother and a Surinamese father. He was raised in the neighborhood Betondorp by his mother and stepfather. Passenier played football in his youth. At the age of 15, he attended a kickboxing event for the first time, and became impressed by the visitors and the atmosphere. While working in a bar, he met kickboxing world champion Gilbert Ballantine. Passenier sparred with Ballantine, who appreciated Passenier's skills and invited him to work as an assistant coach. Passenier never entered the professional ring himself.

=== Mike's Gym ===
Passenier began teaching martial arts in 2002. A year later, he opened his own gym, named Mike's Gym. Passenier became more known in the world of kickboxing when he trained Joerie Mes, who was considered one of the best combination specialists in kickboxing. The silhouette of Mes was made part of the Mike's Gym logo.

Mike's Gym became one of the biggest martial arts gyms in the Netherlands. Passenier's pupils are distinguished by their willingness to win by knockout during a bout. They do not use points-oriented tactics. Passenier trained many world champions, including Melvin Manhoef, Badr Hari, Murthel Groenhart and Sahak Parparyan. At certain stages of their careers, he coached top contenders such as Gökhan Saki, Artur Kyshenko, Alistair Overeem, Freddy Kemayo, Björn Bregy, Sergey Adamchuk and Sergei Lashchenko.

On November 26, 2009, a fire broke out in the building next to Mike's Gym, which burned down the gym. The gym was reopened on March 29, 2010.

== Notable fighters trained ==
- Joerie Mes
- Melvin Manhoef
- Badr Hari
- Murthel Groenhart
- Gökhan Saki
- Artur Kyshenko
- Paul Daley
- Sahak Parparyan
- Björn Bregy
- Daniel Sam
- Alistair Overeem
- Giga Chikadze
- Sergey Adamchuk
- Sergei Lashchenko
- Freddy Kemayo
- Cosmo Alexandre
- Yousri Belgaroui
- Donegi Abena
- Antonio Plazibat
- Stoyan Koprivlenski
- Jamal Ben Saddik
- Tariq Osaro
- Chico Kwasi
- Anissa Haddaoui
- Mellony Geugjes
