= Muaythai at the 2013 World Combat Games =

Muay Thai Competition

Muay Thai at the 2013 World Combat Games was held at the Yubileiny - Sports Complex, 'Yubileiny' Hall, in Saint Petersburg, Russia. Preliminary rounds took place on the 19th and 21 October 2013. All the medal events were held on 23 October 2013.

== Medal table ==
Key:

* Host nation (Russia)

Rank	Nation	Gold	Silver	Bronze	Total
1	Russia (RUS)*	3	3	3	9
2	Thailand (THA)	3	2	2	7
3	Ukraine (UKR)	2	2	2	6
4	Belarus (BLR)	1	2	1	4
5	Norway (NOR)	1	0	0	1
5	Peru (PER)	1	0	0	1
7	Italy (ITA)	0	1	0	1
7	Sweden (SWE)	0	1	0	1
9	Australia (AUS)	0	0	2	2
9	France (FRA)	0	0	2	2
9	Iran (IRI)	0	0	2	2
12	Brazil (BRA)	0	0	1	1
12	Canada (CAN)	0	0	1	1
12	Finland (FIN)	0	0	1	1
12	Israel (ISR)	0	0	1	1
12	Kazakhstan (KAZ)	0	0	1	1
12	Kyrgyzstan (KGZ)	0	0	1	1
12	South Korea (KOR)	0	0	1	1
12	Turkey (TUR)	0	0	1	1
Totals (19 entries)		11	11	22	44

== Medal summary ==
=== Men ===
Event	Gold	Silver	Bronze
-54 kg	Preecha Wongsa (THA)	Arslan Bagunov (RUS)	Oleksandr Prokuda (UKR)
-54 kg	Preecha Wongsa (THA)	Arslan Bagunov (RUS)	Yoon Deokjae (KOR)
-57 kg	Sapmanee Ruthaiphan (THA)	Aleksandr Abramov (RUS)	Kostiantyn Trishyn (UKR)
-57 kg	Sapmanee Ruthaiphan (THA)	Aleksandr Abramov (RUS)	Daniiar Kashkaraev (KGZ)
-63.5 kg	Igor Liubchenko (UKR)	Manop Srirupi (THA)	Dmitry Varats (BLR)
-63.5 kg	Igor Liubchenko (UKR)	Manop Srirupi (THA)	Vahid Shahbazi (IRI)
-67 kg	Andrei Kulebin (BLR)	Sergii Kuliaba (UKR)	Zhanserik Amirzhanov (KAZ)
-67 kg	Andrei Kulebin (BLR)	Sergii Kuliaba (UKR)	Supachai Pansuvan (THA)
-71 kg	Zaynalabid Magomedov (RUS)	Vitaly Gurkov (BLR)	Masoud Minaei (IRI)
-71 kg	Zaynalabid Magomedov (RUS)	Vitaly Gurkov (BLR)	Ilya Grad (ISR)
-75 kg	Vitalii Nikiforov (UKR)	Alex Tobiasson Harris (SWE)	Thiago Teixeira (BRA)
-75 kg	Vitalii Nikiforov (UKR)	Alex Tobiasson Harris (SWE)	Konstantin Khuzin (RUS)
-81 kg	Artem Levin (RUS)	Dmitry Valent (BLR)	Kada Bouamama (FRA)
-81 kg	Artem Levin (RUS)	Dmitry Valent (BLR)	Kim Olaf Olsen (AUS)
-91 kg	Artem Vakhitov (RUS)	Emidio Barone (ITA)	Thomas Alizier (FRA)
-91 kg	Artem Vakhitov (RUS)	Emidio Barone (ITA)	İbrahim Giydirir (TUR)

=== Women ===
Event	Gold	Silver	Bronze
-51 kg	Fatima Pinto (NOR)	Miss Ruchira Wongsriwo (THA)	Kristan Lee Armstrong (AUS)
-51 kg	Fatima Pinto (NOR)	Miss Ruchira Wongsriwo (THA)	Oksana Kizhnerova (RUS)
-54 kg	Ratchadaphon Wihantamma (THA)	Natalia Dyachkova (RUS)	Ashley Nichols (CAN)
-54 kg	Ratchadaphon Wihantamma (THA)	Natalia Dyachkova (RUS)	Milija Kristina Heino (FIN)
-60 kg	Valentina Shevchenko (PER)	Anastasiia Sharmonova (UKR)	Pimnipa Tanawatpipat (THA)
-60 kg	Valentina Shevchenko (PER)	Anastasiia Sharmonova (UKR)	Alfiya Ishtryakova (RUS)
