= Mourad Bouzidi =

Dutch kickboxer

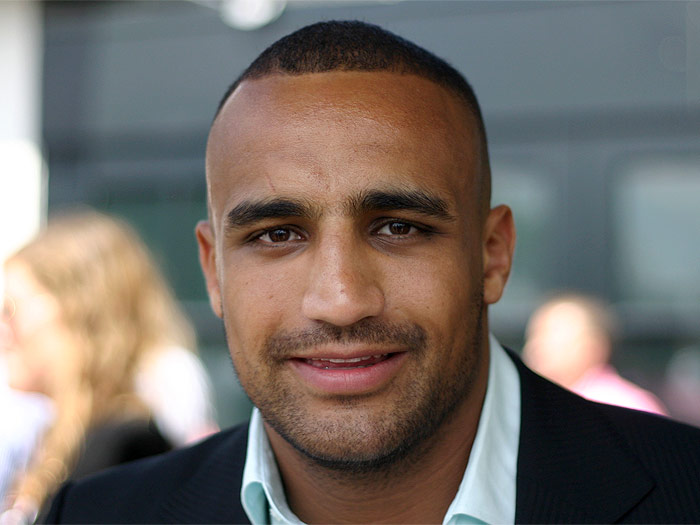
- Born: Mourad Bouzidi; November 23, 1984 (age 41); The Hague, Netherlands
- Native name: مراد بوزيدي
- Other names: The Silent Power
- Nationality: Tunisian; Dutch
- Height: 1.86 m (6 ft 1 in)
- Weight: 95.1 kg (210 lb; 14.98 st)
- Division: Heavyweight
- Reach: 75.5 in (192 cm)
- Style: Kickboxing, Muay Thai
- Fighting out of: The Hague, Netherlands
- Team: Bouzidi Gym; Dojo Kamakura; Team Aerts; Mousid Gym
- Trainer: Anil Dubar; Giel de Jager; Gerard Gordeau; Peter Aerts; Mousid Akhamrane
- Years active: 1997–present

Kickboxing record
- Total: 100
- Wins: 72
- By knockout: 34
- Losses: 25
- By knockout: 8
- Draws: 2
- No contests: 1

Mixed martial arts record
- Total: 2
- Wins: 1
- By submission: 1
- Losses: 1
- By submission: 1

Other information
- Mixed martial arts record from Sherdog
- Last updated on: April 12, 2014

Mourad "The Silent Power" Bouzidi (Arabic: مراد بوزيدي) (born November 23, 1984) is a Dutch–Tunisian heavyweight kickboxer, fighting out of Dojo Kamakura/Team Aerts in The Hague, Netherlands. He is the current Dutch Heavyweight W.F.C.A. kickboxing champion.

== Biography and career ==
Mourad Bouzidi was born in The Hague, Netherlands and started practicing Muay Thai at the age of 10. He had his first fight at the age of 13. Bouzidi still resides in The Hague and trains both at Team Kamakura and Team Aerts under Peter Aerts.

Bouzidi rose to prominence in May 2004 when he defeated Sergey Razvodovskiy, Szilard Szecsei and Konstantin Gluhov on the same night to win the Draka European Championships at +90 kg. He then beat Daniel Leko on March 25, 2005 to win the WKN European Muay Thai title at -96 kg. However, he lost the belt only two months later when he was defeated by Daniel Ghita at Local Kombat 14 "Lupta capitală".

On June 3, 2006, he made his K-1 debut in the 8-man tournament at the K-1 World Grand Prix 2006 in Seoul. He defeated Iranian strongman Mehdi Mirdavoudi by unanimous decision in the quarter-finals, but then lost out to local fighter Kim Min-Soo in the semis. In June the following year, he lost to Gökhan Saki at the K-1 World Grand Prix 2007 in Amsterdam. He then returned in February 2008 when he beat Hesdy Gerges at K-1 MAX Netherlands 2008 The Final Qualification.

He defeated Henriques Zowa via unanimous decision on June 15, 2008 to win the WFCA Dutch Muaythai Super Heavyweight (+95 kg) title.

Bouzidi then began competing for the It's Showtime promotion regularly and took wins over Hasan Gul, Rustemi Kreshnik and Errol Zimmerman between 2008 and 2009 before recording his first promotional loss to Brice Guidon at It's Showtime 2009 Barneveld in November 2009. On February 13, 2010, he faced Badr Hari for the It's Showtime Heavyweight Championship at It's Showtime 2010 Prague and was knocked out in the second round.

On October 16, 2010, he beat Anderson "Braddock" Silva in the quarter-finals of the 2010/11 United Glory World Series at United Glory 12 in Amsterdam. Advancing to the semi-finals in Charleroi on March 19, 2011, Bouzidi lost to Brice Guidon via technical knockout at United Glory 13. He then faced Errol Zimmerman for the second time in his career in a super fight at United Glory 14 in Moscow, losing via decision to bring the pair's rivalry to 1–1.

He faced Gökhan Saki at Glory 2: Brussels on October 6, 2012 in Brussels, Belgium and lost by unanimous decision.

He competed in the sixteen-man 2012 Glory Heavyweight Grand Slam at Glory 4: Tokyo - 2012 Heavyweight Grand Slam in Saitama, Japan on December 31, 2012, and arm injuries were the story of the night for Bouzidi. At the tournament's opening stage, he was drawn against his trainer, the legendary Peter Aerts. Aerts took the first round but broke his right hand and was unable to come out for the second, gifting Bouzidi a passage to the quarter-finals where he came up against Daniel Ghiţă. After a close first round, Bouzidi injured his right arm in round two by throwing an awkward punch that was countered by a powerful kick from Ghiţă. He was unable to continue and was counted out by the referee.

He defeated Fabiano Cyclone via TKO due to corner stoppage in round two at Glory 6: Istanbul in Istanbul, Turkey on April 6, 2013.

He competed in the Glory 9: New York - 2013 95kg Slam in New York City on June 22, 2013, losing out to Danyo Ilunga by unanimous decision in the quarter-finals.

He lost to Saulo Cavalari by first-round KO on the Glory 12: New York - Lightweight World Championship Tournament undercard in New York City, New York, US on November 23, 2013.

He was expected to face Brian Collette at Glory 15: Istanbul in Istanbul, Turkey on April 12, 2014 but Collette withdrew after suffering an injury and was replaced by Randy Blake. Bouzidi defeated Blake via unanimous decision.

== Titles ==
- 2008 WFCA Dutch Muaythai Super Heavyweight (+95 kg) champion
- 2006 K-1 World Grand Prix in Seoul semi finalist
- 2005–2006 World Champion WFCA
- 2005–2006 European Champion WKN
- 2004–2005 World Champion WFCA
- 2005 Champion Tournoi Marrakech
- 2004–2005 European Champion DRAKA
- 2002–2003 The Eight Tournament Champion

== Kickboxing record ==
Kickboxing record
72 wins (34 (T)KOs, 37 decisions), 25 losses, 3 draws
| Date | Result | Opponent | Event | Location | Method | Round | Time |
| 2018-09-29 | Loss | (Netherlands) Michael Duut | Glory 59: Amsterdam | Amsterdam, Netherlands | KO (punch) | 3 | 2:56 |
| 2017-05-20 | Win | (Netherlands) Michael Duut | Glory 41: Holland | Den Bosch, Netherlands | DQ (3 point deductions) | 2 | 2:18 |
| 2016-06-25 | Loss | (Democratic Republic of the Congo) Zack Mwekassa | Glory 31: Amsterdam | Amsterdam, Netherlands | TKO (three knockdowns/right punch) | 1 | 1:47 |
Fight was for the interim Glory Light Heavyweight Championship.
| 2015-12-04 | Win | (Germany) Danyo Ilunga | Glory 26: Amsterdam | Amsterdam, Netherlands | Decision (split) | 3 | 3:00 |
| 2015-06-05 | Win | (Belgium) Filip Verlinden | Glory 22: Lille | Lille, France, | Decision (unanimous) | 3 | 3:00 |
| 2015-04-03 | Win | (United States) Dustin Jacoby | Glory 20: Dubai | Dubai, UAE | Decision (unanimous) | 3 | 3:00 |
| 2014-04-12 | Win | (United States) Randy Blake | Glory 15: Istanbul | Istanbul, Turkey | Decision (unanimous) | 3 | 3:00 |
| 2013-11-23 | Loss | (Brazil) Saulo Cavalari | Glory 12: New York | New York City, New York, USA | KO (right overhand) | 1 | 1:23 |
| 2013-06-22 | Loss | (Democratic Republic of the Congo) Danyo Ilunga | Glory 9: New York - 95 kg Slam Tournament, Quarter Finals | New York City, New York, USA | Decision (unanimous) | 3 | 3:00 |
| 2013-04-06 | Win | (Brazil) Fabiano Cyclone | Glory 6: Istanbul | Istanbul, Turkey | TKO (corner stoppage) | 2 | |
| 2012-12-31 | Loss | (Romania) Daniel Ghiţă | Glory 4: Tokyo - Heavyweight Grand Slam Tournament, Quarter Finals | Saitama, Japan | TKO (arm injury) | 2 | 0:40 |
| 2012-12-31 | Win | (Netherlands) Peter Aerts | Glory 4: Tokyo - Heavyweight Grand Slam Tournament, First Round | Saitama, Japan | TKO (broken hand) | 1 | 2:00 |
| 2012-10-06 | Loss | (Turkey) Gökhan Saki | Glory 2: Brussels | Brussels, Belgium | Decision (unanimous) | 3 | 3:00 |
| 2012-06-30 | Win | (Albania) Rustemi Kreshnik | Music Hall & BFN Group present: It's Showtime 57 & 58 | Brussels, Belgium | TKO (injury) | 2 | 2:45 |
| 2012-03-10 | Loss | (Croatia) Mladen Brestovac | Cro Cop Final Fight | Zagreb, Croatia | TKO (injury) | 1 | 0:30 |
| 2012-01-28 | Loss | (Armenia) Sahak Parparyan | It's Showtime 2012 in Leeuwarden | Leeuwarden, Netherlands | Decision (split) | 3 | 3:00 |
| 2011-10-23 | Loss | (Suriname) Ismael Londt | Muay Thai Mania 4 | Rijswijk, Netherlands | KO (uppercut) | 2 | 1:15 |
| 2011-05-28 | Loss | (Curaçao) Errol Zimmerman | United Glory 14: 2010-2011 World Series Finals | Moscow, Russia | Decision (unanimous) | 3 | 3:00 |
| 2011-03-19 | Loss | (France) Brice Guidon | United Glory 13: 2010-2011 World Series Semifinals, Semi Finals | Charleroi, Belgium | TKO (right hook) | 2 | 1:39 |
| 2010-10-16 | Win | (Brazil) Anderson Silva | United Glory 12: 2010-2011 World Series Quarterfinals, Quarter Finals | Amsterdam, Netherlands | Decision (unanimous) | 3 | 3:00 |
| 2010-05-29 | Win | (Brazil) Anderson Silva | It's Showtime 2010 Amsterdam | Amsterdam, Netherlands | Ext. R decision | 4 | 3:00 |
| 2010-02-13 | Loss | (Morocco) Badr Hari | It's Showtime 2010 Prague | Prague, Czech Republic | KO (right uppercut) | 2 | 2:55 |
Fight was for It's Showtime Heavyweight title.
| 2010-01-09 | Win | (Turkey) Erhan Deniz | Ring Sensation Championships - Uprising 12 | Rotterdam, Netherlands | Decision (unanimous) | 3 | 3:00 |
| 2009-11-21 | Loss | (France) Brice Guidon | It's Showtime 2009 Barneveld | Barneveld, Netherlands | Decision (unanimous) | 3 | 3:00 |
| 2009-10-31 | Loss | (Ukraine) Pavel Zhuravlev | W5 Grand Prix 2009 Ryazan | Ryazan, Russia | Decision (unanimous) | 3 | 3:00 |
Fight is for W5 (+96 kg) World title.
| 2009-05-16 | Win | (Curaçao) Errol Zimmerman | It's Showtime 2009 Amsterdam | Amsterdam, Netherlands | TKO (ref. stop/cut from knee) | 1 | |
| 2009-03-23 | Win | (Morocco) Mohamed Boubkari | Bad Boys Day | Utrecht, Netherlands | Decision (unanimous) | 3 | 3:00 |
| 2009-02-08 | Win | (Albania) Rustemi Kreshnik | Fights at the Border presents: It's Showtime 2009 | Antwerp, Belgium | TKO (doctor stoppage/cut) | 1 | 1:53 |
| 2008-11-29 | Win | (Turkey) Hasan Gul | It's Showtime 2008 Eindhoven | Eindhoven, Netherlands | TKO (referee stoppage/3 knockdowns) | 1 | |
| 2008-10-05 | Loss | (Montenegro) Goran Radonjic | Tough Is Not Enough | Rotterdam, Netherlands | Decision (unanimous) | 3 | 3:00 |
| 2008-06-15 | Win | (Angola) Henriques Zowa | Rumble in the Hague | The Hague, Netherlands | Decision (unanimous) | 5 | 3:00 |
Wins WFCA Dutch Muaythai Super Heavyweight (+95 kg) title.
| 2008-02-17 | Win | (Netherlands) Hesdy Gerges | K-1 MAX Netherlands 2008 The Final Qualification | Utrecht, Netherlands | Decision (unanimous) | 3 | 3:00 |
| 2007-10-14 | Win | (Armenia) Rickard Gregorian | Kickboks Gala Istanbul | Istanbul, Turkey | KO | | |
| 2007-06-23 | Loss | (Turkey) Gokhan Saki | K-1 World Grand Prix 2007 in Amsterdam | Amsterdam, Netherlands | Decision (unanimous) | 3 | 3:00 |
| 2007-01-27 | Win | (Lithuania) Mindaugas Sakalauskas | WFCA Grand Prix 2007 | Riga, Latvia | Decision (unanimous) | 5 | 3:00 |
| 2006-11-18 | Win | (Belgium) Frédéric Sinistra | La Nuit du Kickboxing | Liège, Belgium | TKO (mid kicks) | | |
| 2006-11-04 | Win | (Morocco) Aziz Jahjah | MSN Fightgala @ Delfzijl | Delfzijl, Netherlands | Decision (unanimous) | 5 | 3:00 |
| 2006-06-03 | Loss | (South Korea) Min-Soo Kim | K-1 World Grand Prix 2006 in Seoul | Seoul, South Korea | Ext.R decision (unanimous) | 4 | 3:00 |
| 2006-06-03 | Win | (Iran) Mehdi Mirdavoudi | K-1 World Grand Prix 2006 in Seoul | Seoul, South Korea | Decision (unanimous) | 3 | 3:00 |
| 2006-03-10 | Win | (Romania) Sebastian Grămadă | Local Kombat 19 "Înfruntarea titanilor" | Iaşi, Romania | Ext. R decision (unanimous) | 4 | 3:00 |
| 2005-12-11 | Win | (Morocco) Samir Bennazouz | WFCA Gala Veghel | Veghel, Netherlands | TKO (doctor stoppage) | | |
| 2005-11-05 | Win | (Netherlands) Jan Lomulder | Muay Thai / MMA gala | Delfzijl, Netherlands | TKO (doctor stoppage) | | |
Wins WFCA World title (Thaiboxing -86,18 kg) .
| 2005-05-14 | Loss | (Romania) Daniel Ghiţă | Local Kombat 14 "Lupta capitală" | Bucharest, Romania | Decision (unanimous) | 5 | 3:00 |
Lose WKN European title (Thaiboxing -96,600 kg) .
| 2005-03-25 | Win | (Croatia) Daniel Leko | Local Kombat 13 | Râmnicu Vâlcea, Romania | KO | 1 | |
Wins WKN European title (Thaiboxing -96,600 kg) .
| 2004-11-06 | Loss | (Morocco) Mounier Zekhini | The Battle Zone Breda | Breda, Netherlands | Decision | 5 | 3:00 |
| 2004-10-16 | Win | (Morocco) Mohtar Bezzerouki | Muaythai & Mixfight Gala | Emmen, Netherlands | KO | 5 | |
| 2004-09-04 | Loss | (Netherlands) Bas van de Muizenberg | Gala Geeraets Gym | Netherlands | Decision (unanimous) | 5 | 3:00 |
Fight was for WFCA Dutch (+90 kg) thaiboxing title.
| 2004-05-09 | Loss | (Latvia) Konstantin Gluhov | 1st Draka European Championships finals | Riga, Latvia | Decision (unanimous) | 5 | 2:00 |
Fight was for 1st Draka European Championships (+90 kg) tournament title.
| 2004-05-09 | Win | (Hungary) Szilard Szecsei | 1st Draka European Championships 1/2 finals | Riga, Latvia | Decision (unanimous) | 5 | 2:00 |
| 2004-05-09 | Win | (Lithuania) Sergey Razvodovskiy | 1st Draka European Championships 1/4 finals | Riga, Latvia | TKO (ref. stop/low kicks) | | |
| 2004-04-24 | NC | (Denmark) Hussein Taymor | Muaythai Gala in Breda | Breda, Netherlands | No contest | | |
| 2004-04-12 | Win | (Morocco) Hakim Akbar | Benefitgala Sporthal Zeeburg | Amsterdam, Netherlands | Decision | 5 | 2:00 |
| 2003-12-12 | Win | (Russia) Ruslan Babolinch | Team Karakura Muaythai & Freefight Gala | Katwijk, Netherlands | Decision | 5 | 2:00 |
| 2001-05-21 | Loss | (Netherlands) Ray Staring | | Katwijk, Netherlands | Decision (unanimous) | 3 | 2:00 |
Legend: Win Loss Draw/no contest Notes

== Mixed martial arts record ==
| Res. | Record | Opponent | Method | Event | Date | Round | Time | Location | Notes |
|---|---|---|---|---|---|---|---|---|---|
| Loss | 1-1 | (Netherlands) Hubert Veenendaal | Submission (choke) | Shooto Holland: Open European Championship | June 21, 2003 | 1 | 0:51 | Schalkhaar, Netherlands | |
| Win | 1-0 | (Netherlands) Niels Kersen | Submission (armbar) | Shooto Holland: Open European Championship | June 21, 2003 | 1 | 1:02 | Schalkhaar, Netherlands | |

== See also ==
- List of K-1 Events
- List of male kickboxers
