= Saulo Cavalari =

Brazilian mixed martial arts fighter

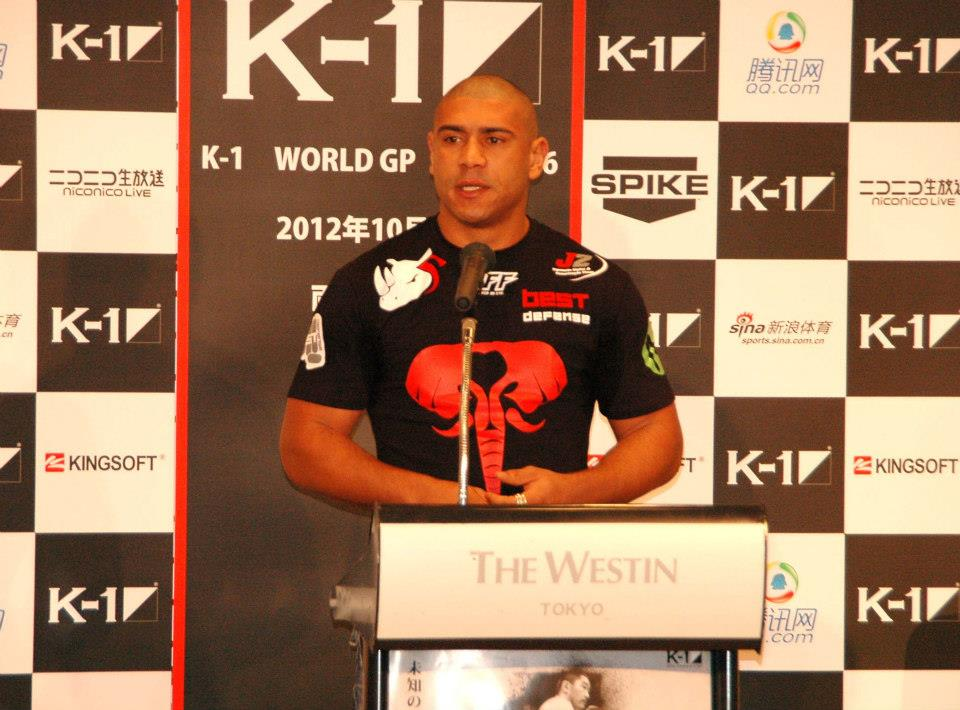
- Born: Saulo Cavalari; 23 May 1989 (age 37); Curitiba, Brazil
- Other names: Cassius Clay, Saulo Clay
- Height: 1.89 m (6 ft 2 1/2 in)
- Weight: 114 kg (251 lb; 17 st 13 lb)
- Division: Light heavyweight
- Reach: 73.7 in (187 cm)
- Style: Kickboxing, Muay Thai
- Stance: Orthodox
- Fighting out of: Curitiba, Brazil
- Team: Thai Brasil

Kickboxing record
- Total: 67
- Wins: 60
- By knockout: 18
- Losses: 7

Amateur record
- Total: 20
- Wins: 18
- Losses: 2

Other information
- Mixed martial arts record from Sherdog
- Last updated on: 19 September 2015

Saulo Cavalari (born 23 May 1989) is a Brazilian light heavyweight kickboxer and mixed martial artist, fighting out of Thai Brasil team in Curitiba, Paraná, Brazil. He has competed in K-1 and is currently signed to GLORY, where he is a former Glory Light Heavyweight Champion.

== Biography and career ==
After achieving impressive fighting record and winning numerous titles, he faced Pavel Zhuravlev in a non-tournament bout at the K-1 World Grand Prix 2012 in Tokyo final 16 on 14 October 2012 and lost via unanimous decision.

In 2013, he signed for the GLORY promotion, joining the light heavyweight division, making his debut on Glory 11: Chicago event, winning on points against highly ranked Filip Verlinden on 12 October.

On 23 November 2013, he knocked out Mourad Bouzidi in the first round at Glory 12: New York undercard in New York City, New York.

Competing for the inaugural Glory Light Heavyweight Championship, he fought in the Glory 15: Istanbul - Light Heavyweight World Championship Tournament in Istanbul, Turkey on 12 April 2014, losing to Tyrone Spong via unanimous decision in the semi-finals.

Cavalari had a rematch with Mwekassa for the vacant Glory Light Heavyweight Championship at Bellator MMA & Glory: Dynamite 1 on 19 September 2015. He won the fight via unanimous decision.

Cavalari competed in the 8-man heavyweight tournament on 18 July 2025 at Karate Combat 55 and lost to Robelis Despaigne by unanimous decision.

== Kickboxing record ==
Professional kickboxing record
Date	Result	Opponent	Event	Location	Method	Round	Time
2023-02-17	Loss	(Belarus) Petr Romankevich	REN TV Fight Club	Minsk, Belarus	KO (knee)	2	1:19
2017-07-14	Loss	(Ukraine) Pavel Zhuravlev	Glory 43: New York	New York City, United States	Decision (unanimous)	3	3:00
2017-02-24	Loss	(Russia) Artem Vakhitov	Glory 38: Chicago	Hoffman Estates, United States	TKO (punches)	2	2:43
For the Glory Light Heavyweight Championship.
2016-10-21	Win	(Netherlands) Brian Douwes	Glory 34: Denver	Broomfield, United States	Decision (unanimous)	3	3:00
2016-03-12	Loss	(Russia) Artem Vakhitov	Glory 28: Paris	Paris, France	Decision (unanimous)	5	3:00
Losses the Glory Light Heavyweight Championship.
2015-09-19	Win	(Democratic Republic of the Congo) Zack Mwekassa	Bellator MMA & Glory: Dynamite 1	San Jose, United States	Decision (majority)	5	3:00
Wins the vacant Glory Light Heavyweight Championship.
2015-04-03	Win	(Russia) Artem Vakhitov	Glory 20: Dubai	Dubai, United Arab Emirates	Decision (split)	3	3:00
Light Heavyweight Title eliminator.
2014-11-07	Win	(Democratic Republic of the Congo) Zack Mwekassa	Glory 18: Oklahoma, Finals	Oklahoma City, United States	KO (high kick)	3	0:20
Wins the Glory Light Heavyweight Contender Tournament.
2014-11-07	Win	(Germany) Danyo Ilunga	Glory 18: Oklahoma, Semi Finals	Oklahoma City, United States	Decision (unanimous)	3	3:00
2014-04-12	Loss	(Suriname) Tyrone Spong	Glory 15: Istanbul - Light Heavyweight World Championship Tournament, Semi Finals	Istanbul, Turkey	Decision (unanimous)	3	3:00
2013-11-23	Win	(Tunisia) Mourad Bouzidi	Glory 12: New York	New York City, United States	KO (overhand right)	1	1:23
2013-10-12	Win	(Belgium) Filip Verlinden	Glory 11: Chicago	Hoffman Estates, United States	Decision (unanimous)	3	3:00
2013-07-27	Win	(Brazil) Felipe Micheletti	WGP 14	São Paulo, Brazil	TKO	5	
Wins WGP Brazilian -94.1 kg championship.
2012-10-14	Loss	(Ukraine) Pavel Zhuravlev	K-1 World Grand Prix 2012 in Tokyo final 16	Tokyo, Japan	Decision (unanimous)	3	3:00
2012-06-02	Loss	(Poland) Tomasz Sarara	Tatneft Cup 2012 2nd selection 1/4 final	Kazan, Russia	Decision (unanimous)	4	3:00
2012-04-05	Win	(Russia) Andrey Shmakov	Tatneft Cup 2012 4th selection 1/8 final	Kazan, Russia	KO (low kick)	2	
2012-02-11	Win	(Brazil) Ricardo Soneca	Tatneft Cup Brasil	Brazil	Decision (unanimous)	3	3:00
2011-09-03	Win	(Brazil) Jhonata Diniz	VII Desafio Profissional de Muay Thai, final	São Paulo, Brazil	Decision (unanimous)	3	3:00
Wins Mini GP Absolute Category.
2011-09-03	Win	(Brazil) Thiago Beowulf	VII Desafio Profissional de Muay Thai, semi finals	São Paulo, Brazil	Decision (unanimous)	3	3:00
2011-06-11	Win	(Brazil) Anísio Leite	Samurai FC 5 - Limited Edition	Brazil	KO (left hook & flying knee)	1	0:37
2010-08-14	Win	(Brazil) Thiago Beowulf	VI Desafio Profissional de Muay Thai 1ºRound	São Paulo, Brazil	Decision (unanimous)	3	3:00
2009	Win	(Brazil) Marcelo Correa	Jungle Fight SP		KO (punches)	1	
	Win	(Brazil) Jhonata Diniz			Decision	3	
Legend: Win Loss Draw/no contest Notes

== Mixed martial arts record ==
Professional record breakdown
7 matches	3 wins	4 losses
By knockout	2	2
By submission	1	1
By decision	0	1

Res.	Record	Opponent	Method	Event	Date	Round	Time	Location	Notes
Loss	3–4	Evgeny Ganin	TKO (punch)	BetCity Fight Nights 129	October 17, 2025	1	4:19	Sochi, Russia	
Loss	3–3	Evgeny Shalomaev	TKO (punches)	Modern Fighting Pankration 254 x Open FC 52	April 26, 2025	1	0:58	Vladivostok, Russia	
Loss	3–2	Matt Adams	Decision (unanimous)	LFA 194	October 18, 2024	3	5:00	Niagara Falls, New York, United States	Heavyweight bout.
Win	3–1	Rafael Giuliani Kirchner	TKO (punches)	Adventure Fighters Tournament 42	December 10, 2022	1	1:07	Mafra, Brazil	
Win	2–1	Matheus Alexandre Lemos	TKO (punches)	Warrious Combat 01	August 28, 2022	1	1:30	Curitiba, Brazil	Return to Light Heavyweight.
Win	1–1	Lucas Prado Ribeiro	Submission (arm-triangle choke)	Torneio Estimulo 15	June 11, 2022	1	1:35	Curitiba, Brazil	Heavyweight debut.
Loss	0–1	Pavel Doroftei	Submission (heel hook)	Phoenix FC 3	September 22, 2017	1	4:04	London, England	Light Heavyweight debut.

== Bare knuckle record ==
Professional record breakdown
2 matches	1 win	1 loss
By knockout	1	1

Res.	Record	Opponent	Method	Event	Date	Round	Time	Location	Notes
Loss	1-1	(Poland) Patryk Tołkaczewski	KO	Gromda 8	March 17, 2022	1	0:06	Pionki, Poland	
Win	1–0	(Russia) Denis Nedashkovsky	TKO	Hardcore Fighting Championship	March 1, 2022	1	0:34	Russia	

== Karate Combat ==
Professional record breakdown
1 match	0 wins	1 loss
By decision	0	1

Res.	Record	Opponent	Method	Event	Date	Round	Time	Location	Notes
Loss	0–1	Robelis Despaigne	Decision (unanimous)	Karate Combat 55	July 18, 2025	2	3:00	Miami, Florida, United States	Last Man Standing Quarterfinal.

== See also ==
- List of male kickboxers
