= Yassine Boughanem =

Belgian kickboxer

- Born: Yassine Adgham-Boughanem; 24 January 1994 (age 32); Brussels, Belgium
- Nickname: Choco Montana
- Nationality: Moroccan; Belgian
- Height: 5 ft 11 in (1.80 m)
- Weight: 179 lb (81 kg; 12 st 11 lb)
- Division: Middleweight (MMA); Heavyweight (Muay Thai)
- Style: Muay Thai, kickboxing
- Fighting out of: Pattaya, Thailand
- Team: Team Boughanem Petchsaman
- Years active: 2011 - present

Kickboxing record
- Total: 169
- Wins: 136
- By knockout: 89
- Losses: 33

Mixed martial arts record
- Total: 3
- Wins: 2
- By knockout: 1
- By submission: 1
- Losses: 1
- By knockout: 1

Other information
- Mixed martial arts record from Sherdog

Yassine Boughanem (born 24 January 1994) is a Moroccan-Belgian Muay Thai fighter, who has been professionally competing since 2011. He is the current WKN World Super Heavyweight Muay Thai champion.

He is the former WBC Muaythai World Super Heavyweight champion, successfully defending this title three times, and the WPMF World Heavyweight champion with two title defenses.

Yassine is the younger brother of Muay Thai world champion Youssef Boughanem.

== Muay Thai career ==
He participated in the 2016 Super Muaythai four man Heavyweight Tournament. After dispatching Liam John McKendry in the semifinal by a first-round TKO, he faced Steven Banks in the finals. Boughanem once again won by a first-round knockout.

Steven Banks and Yassine Boughanem met once more a year later, during the Phoenix 5 in the famed Rajadamnern Stadium, this time fighting for the vacant WBC Muaythai Super Heavyweight title. Boughanem was able to push the faced again his opponent and won both the fight and title by a unanimous decision.

At Phoenix 8 Boughanem made his first title defense against James McSweeney. Boughanem dominated throughout most of the fight, controlling the center of the ring, and won the fight by a unanimous decision (49–48, 49-48 and 49–47). During Phoenix 10 Yassine made the second WBC Muaythai Super Heavyweight title defense, against Jurjendal. Boughanem was able to win a unanimous decision.

Boughanem fought for the World Super Heavyweight Muay Thai title during PSM Fight Night, while also putting his WBC title on the line, with his opponent being the Portuguese native Bruno Susano. The fight was stopped by a doctor in at the end of the second round, as Susano sustained a cut on his forehead which rendered him unable to continue to fight.

Yassine participated in the 2019 PSM Fight Night tournament, being the defending WBC Muaythai super heavyweight champion. In the semi-finals he scored a TKO victory over Mohan Bouzidi, as his corner stopped the fight at the end of the first round. In the final bout he managed a first-round knockout over Sofian Laidouni. The Belgian Federation declared the fight a no contest, as Yassine hit Sofian with a strike as he was falling to the canvas in a knockdown. The WBC Muaythai however, count the fight as a win and title defense for Boughanem.

== Mixed martial arts career ==
Boughanem made his mixed martial arts debut fellow debutante Jacky Jeanne at Ares FC 3 on February 3, 2022. He lost the fight by a second-round technical knockout after a dislocation of his left shoulder.

== Championship and accomplishments ==
- Super Muaythai
  - 2016 Super Muaythai Heavyweight Tournament Winner
- World Professional Muaythai Federation
  - WPMF World Heavyweight Championship
    - Two successful title defenses
- World Boxing Council Muaythai
  - WBC Muaythai World Super Heavyweight Championship
    - Three successful title defenses
- World Kickboxing Network
  - WKN World Super Heavyweight Championship

== Mixed martial arts record ==
Professional record breakdown
4 matches	3 wins	1 loss
By knockout	1	1
By submission	1	0
By decision	1	0

Res.	Record	Opponent	Method	Event	Date	Round	Time	Location	Notes
Win	3–1	David Karp	Decision (split)	Fight and Furious in Octogon 3	November 29, 2025	3	5:00	Longeville-lès-Metz, France	Catchweight (179 lb) bout.
Win	2–1	Deivis Colina	TKO (punches)	WNC 3	October 18, 2025	1	1:46	Geneva, Switzerland	Catchweight (179 lb) bout.
Win	1–1	Fabrice Toure	Submission (rear-naked choke)	Fight and Furious in Octogon 2	February 7, 2025	2	N/A	Metz, France	Catchweight (179 lb) bout.
Loss	0–1	Jacky Jeanne	TKO (retirement)	Ares FC 3	February 3, 2022	2	0:59	Paris, France	Light Heavyweight debut.

== Muay Thai record ==
Professional Muay Thai record
136 wins (89 (T)KOs), 33 losses, 0 draws, 1 no contest
Date	Result	Opponent	Event	Location	Method	Round	Time
2026-04-04		(France) Wael Halim	Thai Boxing Showtime 8	Hazebrouck, France			
2019-11-16	NC	(France) Sofian Laidouni	PSM Fight Night 2	Brussels, Belgium	(kick to a downed opponent)	1	
PSM Tournament Final. For the WBC Muaythai title.
2019-11-16	Win	(France) Mohand Bouzidi	PSM Fight Night 2	Brussels, Belgium	TKO (corner stoppage)	1	3:00
PSM Tournament Semi-final.
2019-5-11	Win	(Romania) Ion Grigore	Fight Event	Brussels, Belgium	TKO	3	
2019-4-22	Win	(Portugal) Bruno Susano	PSM Fight Night	Brussels, Belgium	TKO	2	
Defends the WBC Muaythai World Super Heavyweight title and wins the WKN World Super Heavyweight title.
2018-10-13	Win	(Thailand) Jurjendal	Phoenix 10	Brussels, Belgium	Decision (unanimous)	5	3:00
Defends the WBC Muaythai Super Heavyweight World title.
2018-5-22	Win	(United Kingdom) James McSweeney	Phoenix 8 Bangkok (Lumpinee)	Bangkok, Thailand	Decision (unanimous)	5	3:00
Defends the WBC Muaythai World Super Heavyweight title.
2018-2-26	Win	(United States) Steven Banks	Phoenix 5 Bangkok (Rajadamnern)	Bangkok, Thailand	Decision (unanimous)	5	3:00
Wins the WBC Muaythai Super Heavyweight World title.
2018-2-10	Win	(Morocco) Imad el Moutahi	King Of Brussels	Brussels, Belgium	TKO (doctor stoppage)	1	3:00
2017-12-9	Win	(United Kingdom) Daniel Sam	Golden Fight	Levallois-Perret, France	Decision (unanimous)	3	3:00
2017-10-28	Loss	(France) Ciryl Gane	Duel 2	Paris, France	Decision (unanimous)	5	3:00
2017-6-29	Win	(Romania) Alexandru Lungu	Best Of Siam XI	Paris, France	KO	1	3:00
2016-10-29	Win	(Thailand) Benz RSM Academy	Best Of Siam IX	Paris, France	Decision (unanimous)	3	3:00
2016-8-28	Win	(United States) Steven Banks	Super Muaythai	Bangkok, Thailand	KO	1	
Super Muaythai Tournament Final.
2016-8-28	Win	(Republic of Ireland) Liam John McKendry	Super Muaythai	Bangkok, Thailand	TKO	1	
Super Muaythai Tournament Semi-final.
2016-5-27	Loss	(Thailand) Benz RSM Academy	Best Of Siam 8 (Rajadamnern)	Bangkok, Thailand	Decision (unanimous)	5	3:00
For the WBC Muaythai World title.
2016-4-30	Win	(France) Samih Bachar	Kerner Thai	Paris, France	Decision (split)	3	3:00
2015-12-11	Win	(Turkey) Yüksel Ayaydın	Best Of Siam 7	Paris, France	Decision (unanimous)	3	3:00
2015-10-10	Loss	(France) Mickael Yapi	Shock Muay 7	Saint-Denis, France	TKO	4	
2015-6-19	Win	(France) Thomas Alizier	Best Of Siam 6	Paris, France	Decision (unanimous)	3	3:00
2015-3-6	Win	(Thailand) Panom TopkingBoxing	Friday 6 March	Pattaya, Thailand	Decision (unanimous)	5	3:00
2015-	Loss	(Thailand) Avatar Tor.Morsri		Thailand	Decision	5	3:00
2014-10-10	Win	(France) Malik Aliane	Chawang Stadium	Ko Samui, Thailand	KO	3	
2014-5-10	Win	(Thailand) Fahsai	Suk Singpatong + Sitnumnoi	Phuket, Thailand	KO	2	
2014-4-19	Win	(Thailand) Kongjak Sor Tuantong	Suk Singpatong + Sitnumnoi	Phuket, Thailand	Decision (unanimous)	5	3:00
2014-2-7	Win	(Thailand) Panom TopkingBoxing	Super Big Match	Phuket, Thailand	Decision (unanimous)	5	3:00
2014-1-19	Win	(Thailand) Kongjak Sor Tuantong	Sunday Championship Night	Phuket, Thailand	Decision (unanimous)	5	3:00
2014-1-1	Win	(Thailand) Berneung TopkingBoxing	Wednesday Championship Night	Phuket, Thailand	KO	5	
2014-12-4	Win	(Thailand) Kiatchai Phuket Top Team	Wednesday Championship Night	Phuket, Thailand	Decision (unanimous)	5	3:00
2013-1-20	Win	(Thailand) Kiatchai Kiatchaimuaythai Gym	Wednesday Championship Night	Phuket, Thailand	Decision (unanimous)	5	3:00
Legend: Win Loss Draw/no contest Notes

== See also ==
- List of male kickboxers
