= Dmitry Varats =

Belarusian Muay Thai kickboxer

- Born: 8 December 1988 (age 37); Grodno, Byelorussian SSR, Soviet Union
- Native name: Dzmitry Varats
- Nationality: Belarus
- Height: 1.78 m (5 ft 10 in)
- Weight: 66.0 kg (145.5 lb; 10.39 st)
- Division: Featherweight; Lightweight
- Style: Muay Thai
- Stance: Orthodox
- Fighting out of: Belarus

Dmitry Varats (born 8 December 1988) is a Belarusian featherweight Muay Thai kickboxer.

== Career ==
11 October 2014 in Russia W5 Grand Prix, Dmitry Varats defeated Sergey Kulyaba win the 2014 W5 Grand Prix -66 kg tournament Championship belt.

On 28 December 2015, Varats took part in a 4-man tournament for the TOP KING World series -70 kg title. In the semifinals he defeated Kem Sitsongpeenong by first-round technical knockout and in the final he defeated Khayal Dzhaniev by extension round decision to capture the title.

29 October 2016 in Pattaya, Thailand Topking World Series 8, Final, Dmitry Varats defeated Khayal Dzhaniev via extra round decision to win the Toking World Series -70 kg tournament Championship belt.

On 25 May 2019, at Glory of Heroes 38, Varates faced Qiu Jianliang for the ISKA World Junior Lightweight title. He lost the fight by TKO, after Varats withdrew from the bout at the end of the second round.

On 14 December 2019, Varats defeated Morgan Adrar by decision in the semifinals of the Golden Fight Tournament. In the finals he defeated Saengsam by first-round knockout.

Varats faced Buakaw Banchamek at World Fight Tournament in Phnom Penh, Cambodia on 6 July 2022. He lost the fight via unanimous decision.

On 7 March 2026, Dmitry Varats won the WBC MuayThai Nai Khanom Tom Prestige Welterweight title by defeating England's Kenny Carey via unanimous decision in a 5 × 3-minute bout in the main event of the Warriors Cup held at Madison Square Garden in New York City.

== Championships and awards ==
=== Professional ===
- Top King World Series
  - 2015 Topking World Series -70 kg tournament Championship
- Power of Scotland
  - 2008 Power of Scotland tournament Runner-Up
- Golden Fight
  - 2019 Golden Fight Tournament Championship
- Warrior's Cup (WCMT)
  - 2025 WCMT Welterweight Champion
  - 2024 WCMT Welterweight Champion
  - 2024 WCMT Welterweight Champion
- WBC Muay Thai
  - 2026 WBC Muay Thai Nai Khanomtom Welterweight Champion

=== Amateur ===
- International Federation of Muaythai Associations
  - 2022 IFMA European Championships -67 kg (gold)
  - 2021 IFMA World Championships -67 kg (bronze)
  - 2019 IFMA European Championships -67 kg (silver)
  - 2019 IFMA World Championships -67 kg (bronze)
  - 2018 IFMA World Championships -67 kg (gold)
  - 2017 IFMA World Championships -67 kg (gold)
  - 2016 IFMA-EMF European Championships -67 kg (gold)
  - 2014 IFMA-EMF European Championships -63.5 kg (gold)
  - 2014 IFMA World Championships -63.5 kg (silver)
  - 2013 IFMA World Championships -63.5 kg (bronze)
  - 2013 IFMA European Championships -63.5 kg (gold)
  - 2012 IFMA European Championships -63.5 kg (gold)
  - 2011 IFMA European Championships -60 kg (gold)
  - 2010 IFMA World Championships -60 kg (bronze)
- World Combat Games
  - 2013 World Combat Games -63.5 kg (bronze)

=== Kickboxing ===
- W5
  - 2014 W5 Grand Prix -66 kg tournament Championship

== Fight record ==
Kickboxing record
Date	Result	Opponent	Event	Location	Method	Round	Time
2026-03-07	Win	(United Kingdom) Kenny Carey	Warriors Series III	New York, United States	Decision (Unanimous)	5	3:00
Wins the WBC Muay Thai Nai Khanomtom Welterweight Title.
2025-10-18	Win	(Bolivia) Marcos Vasquez	Warrior's Cup LXXII & RFC Promotions	White Plains, New York, United States	KO/TKO	4	0:58
Defends the WCMT Welterweight title.
2024-12-13	Win	(United States) David Agbodji	Warrior's Cup 66: Season Closer	Queens, New York, United States	KO/TKO	3	0:44
Wins the vacant WCMT Welterweight title.
2024-06-14	Win	(United States) Stavone Warren	Warrior's Cup 62	Queens, New York, United States	KO/TKO	5	1:09
Wins the WCMT Welterweight title.
2023-02-18	Win	(Spain) Victor Conesa	The Blind Battle	Paris, France	Decision	3	
2022-07-06	Loss	(Thailand) Buakaw Banchamek	World Fight Kun Khmer Series	Phnom Penh, Cambodia	Decision	3	3:00
2021-10-16	Win	(Estonia) Ott Remmer	KOK 94 World Championship in Tallinn	Tallinn, Estonia	Decision	3	3:00
2021-5-21	Win	(Poland) Przemyslaw Kierpacz	KOK 88 World Series in Warsaw	Warsaw, Poland	TKO	2	
2019-12-14	Win	(Thailand) Saengsam	Golden Fight Tournament Final	Paris, France	KO	1	
Wins the 2019 Golden Fight Tournament Championship.
2019-12-14	Win	(France) Morgan Adrar	Golden Fight Tournament Semi Finals	Paris, France	Decision	3	
2019-05-25	Loss	(China) Qiu Jianliang	Glory of Heroes 38: Shantou	Shantou, China	TKO (retirement)	2	3:00
For the 2019 ISKA Junior Lightweight (-67 kg) World Championship.
2018-12-01	Win	(France) Celestin Mendes	Credissimo Golden Fight	Levallois-Perret, France	TKO	4	
2018-08-05	Win	(Netherlands) Damian Johanen	ACK KB 17	Russia	Decision (Unanimous)	3	3:00
2018-03-24	Win	(Slovakia) Marco Novak	Hanuman Cup 37	Slovakia	Decision	5	3:00
2017-05-27	Loss	(Thailand) Chujaroen Dabransarakarm	Top King 13 World Series	China	Decision	3	3:00
2017-01-14	Win	(China) Li Chinrui	Top King World Series	China	KO	2	
2016-08-27	Loss	(Thailand) Yodwicha Por Boonsit	Top King World Series 10	Yantai, China	Decision	3	3:00
2016-07-02	Loss	(China) Tie Yinghua	Glory of Heroes 3	Jiyuan, China	Extra Round Decision	4	3:00
2015-12-28	Win	(Russia) Khayal Dzhaniev	Topking World Series 8, Final	Pattaya, Thailand	Ex.R Decision	4	
Wins the 2015 Topking World Series -70 kg tournament Championship.
2015-12-28	Win	(Thailand) Kem Sitsongpeenong	Topking World Series 8, Semi Finals	Pattaya, Thailand	TKO (Punches)	1	
2015-10-17	Loss	(France) Jimmy Vienot	Topking World Series	China	Decision	3	3:00
2015-10-03	Win	(Australia) Nathan Robson	Xtreme Muay Thai 2015	Macau	Decision	3	3:00
2015-09-20	Win	(Thailand) Dechrid Sathian Muaythai Gym	Topking World Series TK6	Vientiane, Laos	Decision	3	3:00
2015-07-28	Loss	(Thailand) Pakorn P.K. Saenchai Muaythaigym	TopKing World Series 4	Hongkong, China	Decision	3	3:00
2015-04-11	Loss	(Thailand) Sak Kaoponlek	Oktagon	Assago, Italy	Decision	3	3:00
2014-11-30	Win	(Russia) Dmitry Grafov	W5 Grand Prix Final	Russia	Decision	3	3:00
2014-11-30	Win	(Thailand) Thongchai Kiatprapat	W5 Grand Prix Final	Russia	Decision	3	3:00
2014-10-11	Win	(Ukraine) Sergey Kulyaba	W5 Grand Prix Final	Russia	Decision	3	3:00
Wins the 2014 W5 Grand Prix -66 kg tournament Championship.
2014-10-11	Win	(Russia) Rasul Kachakaev	W5 Grand Prix Semi Finals	Russia	Decision	3	3:00
2014-09-13	Win	(Thailand) Rungravee Sasiprapa	Topking World Series	Minsk, Belarus	KO (Right Head Kick)	1	
2014-03-01	Win	(Slovakia) Rudolf Durica	W5 Grand Prix Orel XXIV	Orel, Russia	Decision	3	3:00
2013-11-16	Win	(Belarus) Yuri Zhukovsskiy	W5 Grand Prix Orel	Orel, Russia	Decision	3	3:00
2013-04-24	Loss	(Ukraine) Sergey Kulyaba	W5 Grand Prix Orel XXI	Russia	Decision	3	3:00
2012-06-03	NC	(Poland) Tomasz Makowski	Kings Of Muay Thai	Grodno, Belarus	no contest		
2012-04-27	Win	(Ukraine) Maxim Kolpak	Mortal Bet	Russia	KO	1	
2010-04-16	Win	(Moldova) Igor Frunze	Mix Fight	Belarus	KO	1	
2009-09-12	Loss	(United Kingdom) Dean James	Warrington Fight Night	United Kingdom	Decision	3	3:00
For the 2009 WMC European Championship.
2008-05-04	Loss	(France) Sebastien Ocaña	Power of Scotland 4 Tournament Final	United Kingdom	Decision	3	
For the 2008 Power of Scotland tournament Championship.
2008-05-04	Win	(United Kingdom) Andy Howson	Power of Scotland 4 Tournament Semi Finals	United Kingdom	TKO	2	
2008-05-04	Win	(France) Albert Veera Chey	Power of Scotland 4 Tournament Quarter Finals	United Kingdom	Decision	3	3:00
2007-04-21	Win	(Poland) Tomasz Makowski	Muay Thai	Grodno, Belarus	KO	3	3:00
2006-11-26	Win	(United Kingdom) Damien Trainor	Muay Thai Super Fight	United Kingdom	Decision	3	3:00
Legend: Win Loss Draw/No contest Notes

Amateur Muay Thai record
Date	Result	Opponent	Event	Location	Method	Round	Time
2022-02-20	Win	(Turkey) Erdem Taha Dincer	2022 IFMA European Championships, Final	Istanbul, Turkey	Decision (29:28)	3	3:00
Wins 2022 IFMA European Championships -67.5kg Gold Medal.
2022-02-19	Win	(Ukraine) Igor Liubchenko	2022 IFMA European Championships, Semi Finals	Istanbul, Turkey	RSCH	3	
2022-02-17	Win	(France) Alexis Sautron	2022 IFMA European Championships, Quarter Finals	Istanbul, Turkey	RSCO	3	
2021-12-10	Loss	(Thailand) Anueng Khatthamarasri	2021 IFMA World Championships, Semi Finals	Bangkok, Thailand	Decision (29:28)	3	3:00
Wins 2021 IFMA World Championships -67kg Bronze Medal.
2021-12-09	Win	(Israel) Itai Gayer	2021 IFMA World Championships, Quarter Finals	Bangkok, Thailand	Decision (30:27)	3	3:00
2021-12-08	Win	(Greece) Georgios Moustakis	2021 IFMA World Championships, Second Round	Bangkok, Thailand	RSCB	1	
2021-12-08	Win	(Russia) Kirill Khomutov	2021 IFMA World Championships, First Round	Bangkok, Thailand	RSCH	3	
2019-11-10	Loss	(Israel) Itay Gayer	2019 IFMA European Championships, Final	Minsk, Belarus	Decision (29:27)	3	3:00
Wins 2019 IFMA European Championships -67kg Silver Medal.
2019-11-08	Win	(France) Oumar Bathily	2019 IFMA European Championships, Semi Finals	Minsk, Belarus	Decision (30:27)	3	3:00
2019-11-06	Win	(Russia) Alexey Balyko	2019 IFMA European Championships, Quarter Finals	Minsk, Belarus	Decision (30:27)	3	3:00
2019-07-26	Loss	(Hungary) Spéth Norbert Attila	2019 IFMA World Championships, Semi Final	Bangkok, Thailand	Decision (30:27)	3	3:00
Wins 2019 IFMA World Championships -67kg Bronze Medal.
2019-07-25	Win	(United Arab Emirates) Nouredine Samir	2019 IFMA World Championships, Quarter Final	Bangkok, Thailand	RSCO	3	
2019-07-24	Win	(Finland) Surachai Sosom	2019 IFMA World Championships, Second Round	Bangkok, Thailand	Decision (30:27)	3	3:00
2018-05-19	Win	(Hungary) Spéth Norbert Attila	2018 IFMA World Championships, Final	Cancún, Mexico	Decision (30:27)	3	3:00
Wins 2018 IFMA World Championships -67kg Gold Medal.
2018-05-16	Win	(Kazakhstan) Zhanibek Kanatbayev	2018 IFMA World Championships, Semi Final	Cancún, Mexico	Decision (30:27)	3	3:00
2018-05-14	Win	(Russia) Sergey Kosykh	2018 IFMA World Championships, Quarter Final	Cancún, Mexico	Decision (30:27)	3	3:00
2018-05-12	Win	(United States) Henry Lee	2018 IFMA World Championships, Second Round	Cancún, Mexico	RSCH	3	
2017-05-12	Win	(Thailand) Mana Samchaiyaphum	2017 IFMA World Championships, Final	Minsk, Belarus	RSCB	3	
Wins 2017 IFMA World Championships -67kg Gold Medal.
2017-05-10	Win	(Ukraine) Oleh Huta	2017 IFMA World Championships, Semi Final	Minsk, Belarus	RSCH	1	
2017-05-07	Win	(Poland) Mateusz Janik	2017 IFMA World Championships, Quarter Final	Minsk, Belarus	RSCO	1	
2016-10-29	Win	(Turkey) Ali Batmaz	2016 IFMA European Championships, Final	Split, Croatia	Decision (30:27)	3	3:00
Wins 2016 IFMA European Championship 67kg Gold Medal.
2016-10-27	Win	(Ukraine) Vasyl Sorokin	2016 IFMA European Championships, Semi Final	Split, Croatia	Decision (30:27)	3	3:00
2016-10-24	Win	(France) Thibaut Arias	2016 IFMA European Championships, Quarter Final	Split, Croatia	Decision (30:27)	3	3:00
2016-05-21	Loss	(Thailand) Yutthapong Sitthichot	2016 IFMA World Championships, 1/8 Finals	Jönköping, Sweden	Decision (29:28)	3	3:00
2015-08-	Loss	(Russia) Magomed Zaynukov	2015 IFMA Royal World Cup, 1/8 Finals	Bangkok, Thailand	Decision		
2014-09-	Win	(Ukraine) Igor Liubchenko	2014 IFMA European Championships, Final	Kraków, Poland	Decision	3	3:00
Wins 2014 IFMA European Championship -63.5kg Gold Medal.
2014-09-	Win	(Finland) Peter Sazonov	2014 IFMA European Championships, Semi Finals	Kraków, Poland	Decision	3	3:00
2014-09-	Win	(France) Ahmed Moufti	2014 IFMA European Championships, Quarter Finals	Kraków, Poland	Decision	3	3:00
2014-05-	Loss	(Ukraine) Igor Liubchenko	2014 IFMA World Championships, Quarter Finals	Langkawi, Malaysia	Decision	3	3:00
Wins 2014 IFMA World Championship -63.5kg Silver Medal.
2014-05-	Win	(Philippines) Andrea Arduini	2014 IFMA World Championships, Semi Finals	Langkawi, Malaysia	Decision	3	3:00
2014-05-	Win	(Uzbekistan) Khochbar Aygubov	2014 IFMA World Championships, Quarter Finals	Langkawi, Malaysia	Decision	3	3:00
2014-05-	Win	(Iran) Masoud Abdolmaleki	2014 IFMA World Championships, 1/8 Finals	Langkawi, Malaysia			
2013-10-21	Loss	(Ukraine) Igor Liubchenko	2013 World Combat Games, Semi Final	Bangkok, Thailand	Decision		
Wins 2013 World Combat Games Muay Thai -63.5kg Silver Medal.
2013-07-	Win	(Russia) Kaplan Abukov	2013 IFMA European Championship, Final	Lisbon, Portugal	Decision	4	2:00
Wins 2013 IFMA European Championships +63.5kg Gold Medal.
2012-09-13	Loss	(Canada) Hakeem Dawodu	2012 IFMA World Championship, Bronze Medal fight	Saint Petersburg, Russia	Decision	3	3:00
For the IFMA World Championships 2012 -63.5kg Bronze Medal.
2012-09-11	Loss	(Thailand) Klumya Akephon	2012 IFMA World Championships, Semi Finals	Saint Petersburg, Russia			
2012-09-10	Win	(Kazakhstan) Zhanserik Amirzhanov	2012 IFMA World Championships, Quarter Finals	Saint Petersburg, Russia			
2012-09-08	Win	(Kyrgyzstan) Mirbek Suiumbaev	2012 IFMA World Championships, First Round	Saint Petersburg, Russia			
2012-04-	Win	(Ukraine) Igor Liubchenko	2012 IFMA European Championships 2012, Final	Antalya, Turkey	Decision	3	3:00
Wins 2012 IFMA European Championships -63.5kg Gold Medal.
2011-09-25	Loss	(Thailand) Wuttichai Meejan	2011 IFMA World Championships, Semi Finals	Tashkent, Uzbekistan	Decision	4	2:00
Wins 2011 IFMA World Championships -60kg Bronze Medal.
2011-09-23	Win	(Netherlands) Vrani Caphin	2011 IFMA World Championships, Quarter Finals	Tashkent, Uzbekistan	RSC.O	1	
2011-04-	Win	(Ukraine) Igor Liubchenko	2011 IFMA European Championships, Final	Antalya, Turkey	Decision	4	2:00
Wins 2011 IFMA European Championships -60kg Gold Medal.
2011-04-	Win		2011 IFMA European Championships, Semi Finals	Antalya, Turkey			
2011-04-27	Win		2011 IFMA European Championships, Quarter Finals	Antalya, Turkey			
2011-04-25	Win	(Russia) Akhmed Haybulaev	2011 IFMA European Championships, 1/8 Finals	Antalya, Turkey	Decision	4	2:00
2010-12-	Loss		2010 I.F.M.A. World Muaythai Championships, Semi Finals	Bangkok, Thailand			
Wins 2010 IFMA World Championships -60kg Bronze Medal.
2010-12-	Win	(Ukraine) igor Liubchenko	2010 I.F.M.A. World Muaythai Championships, Quarter Finals	Bangkok, Thailand			
Legend: Win Loss Draw/No contest Notes
