= Zack Mwekassa =

Congolese boxer and kickboxer

- Born: 20 January 1984 (age 42); Kinshasa, Democratic Republic of the Congo
- Other names: The Black Panther, Le Guerrier Noir (The Black Warrior)
- Nationality: Congolese; French
- Height: 1.83 m (6 ft 0 in)
- Weight: 95 kg (209 lb; 14 st 13 lb)
- Division: Cruiserweight (boxing); Heavyweight (kickboxing)
- Style: Boxing
- Fighting out of: Johannesburg, Gauteng, South Africa
- Years active: 2006 – present (boxing); 2014 – present (kickboxing)

Professional boxing record
- Total: 19
- Wins: 15
- By knockout: 14
- Losses: 4
- By knockout: 3
- Draws: 0

Kickboxing record
- Total: 19
- Wins: 15
- By knockout: 13
- Losses: 4
- By knockout: 2
- Draws: 0

Other information
- Boxing record from BoxRec
- Last updated on: 19 September 2015

Zack Mwekassa (born 20 January 1984) is a Congolese-French boxer and kickboxer who fights in GLORY. He is a former Interim Glory Light Heavyweight Champion.

As of 1 October 2017, he is ranked the #4 light-heavyweight in the world by CombatPress.com.

== Biography ==
Mwekassa is the son of a chemist and his two brothers are lawyers. In addition to his fighting career, he is trained as a computer network engineer. He and his family were displaced from their native DR Congo during the Second Congo War that began in 1998. He moved to Paris in France with his family where he holds French citizenship.

== Career ==
=== Boxing ===
Mwekassa began his professional boxing career at the age of 22 in 2006 in South Africa. In the first 2 years of his career, he amassed an undefeated streak of 8–0 with all but one of the wins coming by way of TKO or KO. He experienced his first losses back-to-back in 2008 and 2009, before going on another 5-0 undefeated streak...

=== Kickboxing ===
Mwekassa began training in South Africa in 2003 with elite kickboxers, including the late Mike Bernardo. His trainers intended him for the K-1 circuit but the opportunities were scarce, so he moved into professional boxing in 2006.

In 2014, Mwekassa resurrected his interest in kickboxing. He saw GLORY on television and approached the company about fighting for them. He soon found himself scheduled to face popular MMA and kickboxing fighter Pat Barry at Glory 16: Denver. In what many considered a shocking upset, he knocked out Barry with an incredible uppercut in the first round.

Mwekassa returned to the Glory ring on November 7, 2014, at Glory 18: Oklahoma. He was part of a four-man, one-night tournament to decide the next Light Heavyweight title contender. Mwekassa started in impressive fashion as he knocked out Brian Collette in the semifinals. In the finals, he faced Saulo Cavalari. After a competitive back-and-forth two rounds, Mwekassa lost in the third round due to a head kick.

Mwekassa had a rematch with Cavalari for the vacant Glory Light Heavyweight Championship at Bellator MMA & Glory: Dynamite 1 on September 19, 2015. He lost the fight via majority decision.

He fought Mourad Bouzidi for the interim Glory Light Heavyweight title. He defeated Bouzidi by a first-round TKO. Mwekassa fought the reigning Glory champion Artem Vakhitov during Glory 35, losing by TKO in the third round.

== Titles ==
- WBF International Cruiserweight Title
- ABU all Africa heavyweight title
- Interim Glory Light Heavyweight Championship (1 time)

== Professional boxing record ==
19 fights	15 wins	4 losses
By knockout	14	3
By decision	0	1
By disqualification	1	0

No.	Result	Record	Opponent	Type	Round, time	Date	Location	Notes
19	Win	15–4	(Kenya) Bernard Adie	TKO	7 (12)	28 Jun 2014	(Democratic Republic of the Congo) Grand Hôtel, Kinshasa, D.R. Congo	Won vacant African heavyweight title
18	Loss	14–4	(Russia) Dmitry Kudryashov	KO	1 (10), 0:50	30 Nov 2013	Triumph, Lyubertsy, Russia	
17	Win	14–3	(Democratic Republic of the Congo) Mugabon Mudimba	KO	5 (6)	31 May 2013	Southern Sun, Cape Town, South Africa	
16	Loss	13–3	(South Africa) Danie Venter	TKO	4 (10), 2:23	22 Sep 2012	Emperors Palace, Kempton Park, South Africa	Super 8 "Last Man Standing" Tournament: cruiserweight semi-final
15	Win	13–2	(South Africa) Tshepang Mohale	TKO	1 (8), 1:21	16 Jun 2012	Emperors Palace, Kempton Park, South Africa	Super 8 "Last Man Standing" Tournament: cruiserweight quarter-final
14	Win	12–2	(Democratic Republic of the Congo) Kizito Ruhamnye	KO	1 (8), 2:59	23 Nov 2011	Emperors Palace, Kempton Park, South Africa	
13	Win	11–2	(South Africa) Thabiso Mchunu	TKO	6 (8), 1:45	24 Sep 2011	Emperors Palace, Kempton Park, South Africa	
12	Win	10–2	(Democratic Republic of the Congo) Alex Mbaya	TKO	1 (6)	10 May 2011	Emperors Palace, Kempton Park, South Africa	
11	Win	9–2	(Ghana) Epiphanie Pipi	RTD	3 (8), 3:00	1 Mar 2011	Emperors Palace, Kempton Park, South Africa	
10	Loss	8–2	(United States) Paul Jennette	SD	8	10 Oct 2009	(United States) Coliseum Complex Events Center, Greensboro, North Carolina, U.S.	For UBC Intercontinental cruiserweight title
9	Loss	8–1	(Hungary) József Nagy	TKO	6 (12), 1:55	5 Sep 2008	Graceland Hotel Casino, Secunda, South Africa	For vacant WBF (Foundation) cruiserweight title
8	Win	8–0	(Brazil) Luzimar Gonzaga	KO	1 (10), 2:46	1 Feb 2008	Graceland Hotel Casino, Secunda, South Africa	
7	Win	7–0	(Zimbabwe) Chamunorwa Gonorenda	TKO	2 (6)	2 Nov 2007	Indoor Sports Centre, KwaMashu, South Africa	
6	Win	6–0	(Republic of the Congo) Gino Betoko	RTD	2 (12)	6 Jul 2007	Carousel Casino, Hammanskraal, South Africa	Won vacant WBF (Foundation) Intercontinental cruiserweight title
5	Win	5–0	(Ghana) Moyoyo Mensah	TKO	3 (6)	11 May 2007	Sasol Recreation Centre, Secunda, South Africa	
4	Win	4–0	(Democratic Republic of the Congo) Nsitu Mbaya	KO	1 (6)	16 Mar 2007	Civic Hall, Benoni, South Africa	
3	Win	3–0	(South Africa) Basil Ray	TKO	2 (4)	27 October 2006	Wembley Indoor Arena, Johannesburg, South Africa	
2	Win	2–0	(South Africa) Mark Strydom	DQ	1 (?)	5 Sep 2006	Emperors Palace, Kempton Park, South Africa	Deliberate head-butt
1	Win	1–0	(South Africa) Bully Muravha	KO	3 (4), 1:22	12 May 2006	Sasol Sports Arena, Secunda, South Africa	

== Kickboxing record (Incomplete) ==
Kickboxing record (Incomplete)
15 Wins (13 (T)KO's, 1 Decision), 4 Losses, 0 Draws
Date	Result	Opponent	Event	Location	Method	Round	Time	Record
2016-11-05	Loss	(Russia) Artem Vakhitov	Glory 35: Nice	Nice, France	TKO (3 knockdowns)	2	2:23	15–4–0
For the unified Glory Light Heavyweight Championship.
2016-06-25	Win	(Tunisia) Mourad Bouzidi	Glory 31: Amsterdam	Amsterdam, Netherlands	TKO (3 knockdowns)	1	1:47	15–3–0
Wins the interim Glory Light Heavyweight Championship.
2016-04-16	Win	(France) Zinedine Hameur-Lain	Glory 29: Copenhagen	Copenhagen, Denmark	Decision (unanimous)	3	3:00	14–3–0
2015-09-19	Loss	(Brazil) Saulo Cavalari	Bellator MMA & Glory: Dynamite 1	San Jose, California, USA	Decision (majority)	5	3:00	13–3–0
For the vacant Glory Light Heavyweight Championship.
2015-06-05	Win	(United States) Carlos Brooks	Glory 22: Lille	Lille, France	KO (left hook)	1	1:58	13–2–0
2014-11-07	Loss	(Brazil) Saulo Cavalari	Glory 18: Oklahoma, Final	Oklahoma City, Oklahoma, USA	KO (high kick)	3	0:20	12–2–0
For the Glory Light Heavyweight Contender Tournament.
2014-11-07	Win	(United States) Brian Collette	Glory 18: Oklahoma, Semi Finals	Oklahoma City, Oklahoma, USA	KO (left hook)	2	0:45	12–1–0
2014-05-03	Win	(United States) Pat Barry	Glory 16: Denver, Reserve Match	Broomfield, Colorado, USA	KO (left uppercut)	1	2:33	11–1–0
Legend: Win Loss Draw/No contest Notes

== See also ==
- List of male kickboxers
