= Danyo Ilunga =

Congolese-German Muay Thai kickboxer (born 1987)

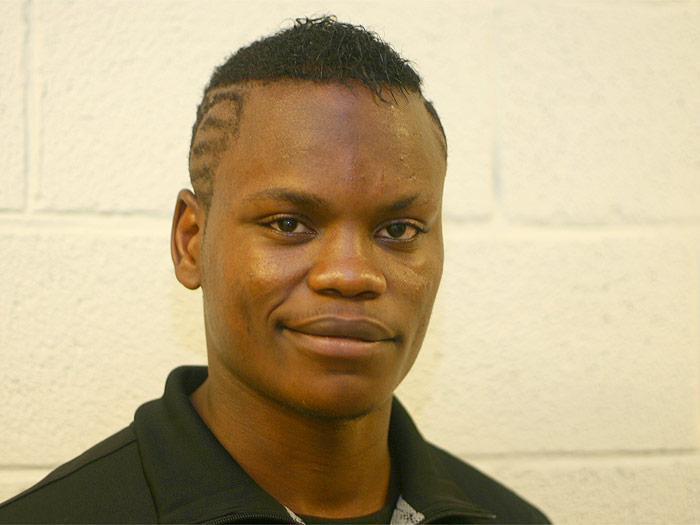
- Born: January 31, 1987 (age 39); Kinshasa, Zaire
- Other names: Dibuba
- Nationality: Congolese; German
- Height: 1.89 m (6 ft 2 1/2 in)
- Weight: 94.9 kg (209 lb; 14.94 st)
- Division: Heavyweight
- Reach: 79 in (200 cm)
- Style: Kickboxing, Muay Thai
- Stance: Orthodox
- Fighting out of: Waldbröl, Germany
- Team: Fighting Gym Waldbröl Team Ilunga
- Trainer: Asmir Burgic; Remy Bonjasky

Kickboxing record
- Total: 74
- Wins: 60
- By knockout: 45
- Losses: 14

Other information
- Spouse: Françoise Ilunga
- Children: 3
- Last updated on: February 13, 2017

Danyo "Dibuba" Ilunga (born January 31, 1987) is a former Congolese-German Muay Thai kickboxer competing in GLORY. Ilunga is a five-time kickboxing and Muay Thai world champion - most notably being the former It's Showtime 95MAX World Champion. As of November 2021, he is the 9th ranked light heavyweight kickboxer in the world according to Combat Press.

== Background ==
Ilunga was born in Zaire as one of seven children. The son of a prominent politician and the grandson of a local chief, the family had to flee due to the recurring conflict in the Democratic Republic of the Congo, resettling in Germany. A fan of martial arts films starring actors such as Jean-Claude Van Damme and Jackie Chan, Ilunga's main motivation to compete in kickboxing was watching the legendary Remy Bonjasky's fights. In 2007 at the age of 19, Ilunga took up kickboxing under the tutelage of K-1 Germany 2003 Champion and now trainer, Asmir Burgic. Ilunga would go on to train with Bonjasky himself. Ilunga's father, who later became a pastor, did not initially approve of Ilunga's career path, but his viewpoint switched after seeing his son win multiple titles and have a wealth of success in the sport.

== Kickboxing career ==
After winning several domestic titles Ilunga entered the four man "1-King" Muay Thai Tournament in Bamberg, defeating both of his opponents on the night by stoppage to claim the Super Heavyweight Championship. He followed up this victory the next year by claiming the vacant W.K.A. European Championship by defeating Tomi Colic, a late replacement for original opponent Roland Dabinovci, in what was a competitive fight.

By the end of 2009, Ilunga won his first world title beating Jochen Gieb by TKO in the third to claim the I.M.C. belt. He then followed his trainer and mentor Asmir Burgic by winning the German King Cup later that year (Burgic had won the previous edition) and retained his I.M.C. world title later that year by easily stopping his Turkish opponent in the first round. After an extensive winning streak on the local scene, beating fighters such as Karl Glischynski, Danyo lost his first match in a while, dropping a decision to the Dutch based Angolan Henriques Zowa. Unused to defeat, Danyo had a chance to make up for this setback in Leverkusen facing previous foe Karl Glischynski for the I.K.B.O. world title recently vacated by Florian Ogunade. Danyo won the rematch in spectacular fashion, stopping Glischynski in the second with a knee/punch combination to become the new world champion.

In 2011 Danyo, who had recently been training with x3 time K-1 world champion Remy Bonjasky, was called up to make his It's Showtime debut against Wendell Roche for the vacant 95MAX world title recently held by Tyrone Spong. Coming into the fight relatively unheard of outside of Germany, Danyo outworked It's Showtime regular Wendell Roche over five rounds, scoring well with counterattacks to frustrate Roche and gain the unanimous decision victory and the It's Showtime world title belt.

He faced Ali Cenik at Glory 2: Brussels on October 6, 2012, in Brussels, Belgium and won via unanimous decision.

He beat Florian Ogunade bt TKO in round three at the Get in the Ring event in Hamburg, Germany on November 3, 2012.

He KO'd Stephane Susperregui with a second round flying knee at Glory 5: London on March 23, 2013, in London, England.

He went into the Glory 9: New York - 2013 95kg Slam in New York City on June 22, 2013, as the #1 ranked 95 kg fighter in Glory's internal rankings. Ilunga took a wide unanimous decision over Mourad Bouzidi in the quarter-finals before going up against Dustin Jacoby in the semis. The American rookie put up a good fight in round one but Ilunga pulled away in the last two rounds with his low kicks. A highly anticipated match with Tyrone Spong awaited him in the final but it ended in a controversial and anticlimactic fashion. As the fight began, both fighters met in the center of the ring and Spong unloaded a flurry of punches. As Ilunga covered up and prepared to counter, referee Mufadel Elghazaoui jumped in and stopped the fight, giving Spong the TKO win at just sixteen seconds of the first round. Although, it was later revealed that there was a "no standing eight count" rule in effect at the event as per the New York State Athletic Commission's regulations, the stoppage was still deemed premature by much of the kickboxing community.

Ilunga defeated Michael Duut by first-round TKO at Glory 11: Chicago - Heavyweight World Championship Tournament in Hoffman Estates, Illinois, US on October 12, 2013.

He knocked out Andrei Stoica in the first round of the tournament reserve bout at GLORY 15 - Light Heavyweight World Championship Tournament in Istanbul, Turkey on April 12, 2014. The two had spirited exchanges in the first round. Ilunga was consistent with his piercing knees to Stoica, who countered them well with his right hand. Both men were successful and landed hard shots. Stoica thought that he had an advantage on a particular combination but just grazed Ilunga with a hook instead of landing clean. This allowed Ilunga to get underneath it and come back with a huge counter right hand that floored and took Stoica out, who didn't have his feet beneath him to answer the ten count.

In February 2015 Ilunga signed for Croatia's Final Fight Championship promotion.

On the 2nd of October, 2021, Ilunga defeated Piotr Ramankevich at Stekos Fight Night at the Circus Krone in Munich. Shortly after, he announced his retirement from the sport on Instagram.

== Titles ==
- 2019 WKU World Champion Thaiboxing -95 kg
- 2016 Glory Fight of the Year
- 2013 Glory 95kg Slam Tournament Runner-up
- 2011–2013 It's Showtime 95MAX world champion -95 kg (2 title defences)
- 2010 I.K.B.O. Muaythai heavyweight world champion -95 kg
- 2010 I.M.C. Muaythai world champion -95 kg (1st title defence)
- 2009 German King Cup (K-1 rules) heavyweight tournament champion +95 kg
- 2009 I.M.C. Muaythai world champion -95 kg
- 2009 W.K.A. (K-1 rules) heavyweight European champion -95 kg
- 2008 "1-King" International (K-1 rules) super heavyweight tournament champion +100 kg
- IFMA national German champion

== Kickboxing record ==
Kickboxing record
61 wins (46 (T)KOs), 14 losses
Date	Result	Opponent	Event	Location	Method	Round	Time
2021-10-02	Win	(Belarus) Petr Romankevich	Steko's Fight Club	Germany	Decision	5	
2019-10-03	Win	(Netherlands) Brian Douwes	Steko's Fight Club	Germany	Decision	5	
2019-06-19	Win	(Netherlands) Fred Sikking	Steko's Fight Club	Germany	KO (right hook)	2	1:24
2018-12-01	Loss	(United Kingdom) James McSweeney	Mix Fight Gala 25	Germany	KO (spinning backfist)	3	
2018-08-10	Loss	(Russia) Artem Vakhitov	Glory 56: Denver	Broomfield, Colorado, USA	Decision (unanimous)	5	3:00
For Glory Light Heavyweight Championship.
2018-06-02	Win	(England) Fraser Weightman	Glory 54: Birmingham	Birmingham, England	Decision (unanimous)	3	3:00
2017-12-09	Win	(Netherlands) Michael Duut	Glory 49: Rotterdam	Rotterdam, Netherlands	KO (punch)	3	2:26
2017-08-04	Loss	(France) Stéphane Susperregui	Fight Night Saint-Tropez	France	Decision (unanimous)	3	3:00
2017-02-24	Loss	(Brazil) Ariel Machado	Glory 38: Chicago, Semi Finals	Hoffman Estates, Illinois, USA	Decision (unanimous)	3	3:00
2016-12-10	Loss	(Netherlands) Michael Duut	Glory 36: Oberhausen	Oberhausen, Germany	Ext. R. decision (unanimous)	4	3:00
2015-12-04	Loss	(Tunisia) Mourad Bouzidi	Glory 26: Amsterdam	Amsterdam, Netherlands	Decision (split)	3	3:00
2015-11-06	Loss	(Russia) Artem Vakhitov	Glory 25: Milan	Monza, Italy	Decision (unanimous)	3	3:00
2015-08-04	Loss	(Russia) Alexei Papin	Fight Night Saint-Tropez	Saint Tropez, France	Decision (unanimous)	4	2:00
2015-04-17	Loss	(Azerbaijan) Zabit Samedov	GFC Fight Series 3 - Heavyweight Tournament, Final	Dubai, UAE	Ext.R decision (unanimous)	4	3:00
For the GFC Fight Series 3 Heavyweight Tournament.
2015-04-17	Win	(Iran) Jafar Ahmadi	GFC Fight Series 3 - Heavyweight Tournament, Semi Finals	Dubai, UAE	TKO (referee stoppage)	2	—N/a
2014-11-07	Loss	(Brazil) Saulo Cavalari	Glory 18: Oklahoma - Light Heavyweight Contender Tournament, Semi Finals	Oklahoma City, Oklahoma, USA	Decision (unanimous)	3	3:00
2014-06-12	Win	(Czech Republic) Ondřej Hutník	Gibu Fight Night	Prague, Czech Republic	TKO	3	
2014-04-12	Win	(Romania) Andrei Stoica	Glory 15: Istanbul - Light Heavyweight World Championship Tournament, Reserve Match	Istanbul, Turkey	KO (right overhand)	1	2:33
2013-10-12	Win	(Netherlands) Michael Duut	Glory 11: Chicago	Hoffman Estates, Illinois, USA	TKO (left hook)	1	2:23
2013-06-22	Loss	(Suriname) Tyrone Spong	Glory 9: New York - 95 kg Slam Tournament, Final	New York City, New York, USA	TKO (punches)	1	0:16
For the Glory 95kg Slam Tournament.
2013-06-22	Win	(United States) Dustin Jacoby	Glory 9: New York - 95 kg Slam Tournament, Semi Finals	New York City, New York, USA	Decision (unanimous)	3	3:00
2013-06-22	Win	(Tunisia) Mourad Bouzidi	Glory 9: New York - 95 kg Slam Tournament, Quarter Finals	New York City, New York, USA	Decision (unanimous)	3	3:00
2013-03-23	Win	(France) Stephane Susperregui	Glory 5: London	London, England	KO (knee)	2	0:21
2012-11-03	Win	(Germany) Florian Ogunade	Get in the Ring	Hamburg, Germany	TKO (punches)	3	
2012-10-06	Win	(Turkey) Ali Cenik	Glory 2: Brussels	Brussels, Belgium	Decision (unanimous)	3	3:00
2012-09-08	win	(Suriname) Sergio Piqué	Merseburger Fight Night, Final	Merseburg, Germany	KO (left hook)		
Wins K-1 Heavyweight Tournament title
2012-09-08	win	(Curaçao) Wendell Roche	Merseburger Fight Night, Quarter Finals	Merseburg, Germany	Decision	3	3:00
2012-06-30	win	(Belgium) Filip Verlinden	Music Hall & BFN Group present: It's Showtime 57 & 58	Brussels, Belgium	Decision (split)	5	3:00
Retains It's Showtime 95MAX world title (3rd title defence).
2011-11-12	Win	(Spain) Loren Javier Jorge	Street Culture, Fight Club Group & Canary Kickboxing Federation presents: It's Showtime 53	Tenerife, Spain	Decision (unanimous)	5	3:00
Retains It's Showtime 95MAX world title (2nd title defence).
2011-09-17	Win	(Morocco) Mohamed Boubkari	Thailand vs Europe	Stuttgart, Germany	2 ext. R. decision (Unanimous)	5	3:00
2011-06-11	Win	(Serbia) Nenad Pagonis	BFN Group presents: It's Showtime Warsaw	Warsaw, Poland	TKO (referee stoppage)	4	1:13
Retains It's Showtime 95MAX world title -95 kg (1st title defence).
2011-03-06	Win	(Curaçao) Wendell Roche	It's Showtime Sporthallen Zuid	Amsterdam, Netherlands	Decision (unanimous)	5	3:00
Wins vacant It's Showtime 95MAX world title -95 kg.
2010-12-11	Win	(Germany) Karl Glischynski	Masters Fight Night	Leverkusen, Germany	KO (knee & punches)	2	
Wins vacant I.K.B.O. Thai-boxing heavyweight world title -95 kg.
2010-11-14	Win	(Netherlands) Bob van Boxmeer	Thailand vs. Challenger Series: Thailand vs. Germany	Ulm, Germany	Decision (unanimous)	3	3:00
2010-10-09	Loss	(Angola) Henriques Zowa	Mix Fight Gala 10	Darmstadt, Germany	TKO (referee stoppage)	3	
2010-07-04	Win	(Turkey) Serkan Öztürk	Backstreet Fights IV	Cologne, Germany	KO	1	
2010-05-08	Win	(Germany) Karl Glischynski	Rostock Fight Night	Rostock, Germany	TKO (cut)	3	
2010-04-17	Win	(Turkey) Ayhan Kazankaya	Night Fighting	Waldbröl, Germany	KO (punches)	1	
Retains I.M.C. Muaythai world title -95 kg.
2010-04-04	Win	(Netherlands) Revanho Blokland	S-8 Thaiboxing	Wuppertal, Germany	KO	1	
2009-11-14	Win	(Germany) Dennis Sebastian	Germany Kings Cup Round III, Final	Rostock, Germany	KO	3	
Wins German King Cup (K-1 rules) heavyweight tournament title +95 kg.
2009-11-14	Win	(Germany) Moritz Schacht	Germany Kings Cup Round III, Semi Final	Rostock, Germany	TKO	2	
2009-10-10	Win	(Germany) Jochen Gieb	Fight Night Freiburg	Freiburg, Germany	TKO (ref stop/3 knockdowns)	3	
Wins vacant I.M.C. Muaythai world title -95 kg.
2009-06-13	Win	(Croatia) Tomi Colic	Weidener Fight Night	Weiden, Germany	TKO (retirement)	4	3:00
Wins vacant W.K.A. (K-1 rules) heavyweight European title -95 kg.
2009-03-21	Loss	(Brazil) Anderson Silva	VIP Fight Night 2009, Quarter Final	Neuss, Germany	KO (punches)	2	2:07
2008-12-13	Win	(Czech Republic) Jan Müller	The Champions Club Germany '08, Final	Bamberg, Germany	KO (right punch)	2	
Wins "1-King" International (K-1 rules) tournament title +100 kg.
2008-12-13	Win	(Turkey) Mutlu Karabulut	The Champions Club Germany '08, Semi Final	Bamberg, Germany	TKO (ref stoppage)	2	
2008-?-?	Win	(Germany) Patrick Kolbe		Germany	TKO (ref stop/punch)	2	
Legend: Win Loss Draw/no contest Notes

== See also ==
- List of It's Showtime events
- List of It's Showtime champions
- List of male kickboxers
