= Artem Vakhitov =

Russian kickboxer (born 1991)

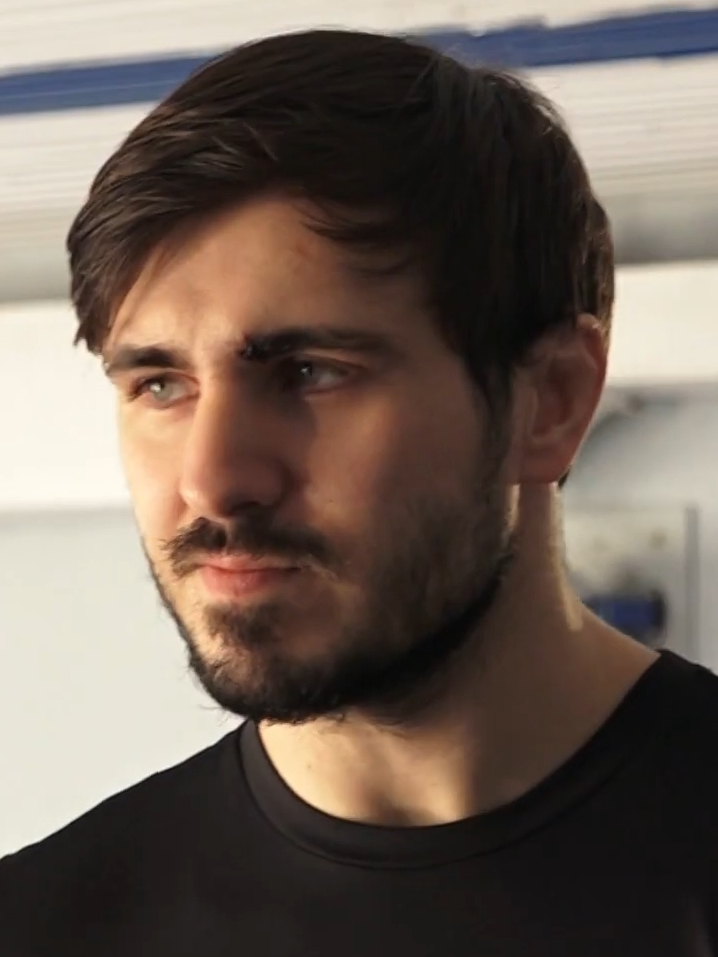
- Vakhitov in February 2021
- Born: Artem Olegovich Vakhitov; April 4, 1991 (age 35); Prokopyevsk, Russian SFSR, Soviet Union
- Native name: Артём Вахитов
- Height: 1.86 m (6 ft 1 in)
- Weight: 95 kg (209 lb; 15.0 st)
- Division: Light Heavyweight; Cruiserweight; Heavyweight
- Reach: 74.5 in (189 cm)
- Style: Kickboxing, Muay Thai
- Stance: Orthodox
- Fighting out of: Prokopyevsk, Russia
- Team: Kuzbass Muay Thai
- Trainer: Vitaly Miller
- Rank: Master of Sport in Muay Thai
- Years active: 2009–present

Kickboxing record
- Total: 31
- Wins: 23
- By knockout: 8
- Losses: 8
- By knockout: 0

Mixed martial arts record
- Total: 4
- Wins: 3
- By knockout: 3
- Losses: 1
- By knockout: 1

Amateur record
- Total: 92
- Wins: 88
- Losses: 4

Artem Vakhitov
Medal record

Representing Russia

Men's Muay Thai

IFMA European Championships
Gold medal – first place	Liepāja 2009	
Gold medal – first place	Velletri 2010	-81 kg
Silver medal – second place	Antalya 2011	-86 kg
Gold medal – first place	Antalya 2012	

IFMA World Championships
Gold medal – first place	Bangkok 2010	-81 kg
Gold medal – first place	Tashkent 2011	-81 kg
Gold medal – first place	Saint Petersburg 2012	-86 kg
Gold medal – first place	Bangkok 2015	-91 kg

World Combat Games
Silver medal – second place	Beijing 2010	-81 kg
Gold medal – first place	Saint Petersburg 2013	-91 kg

Artem Olegovich Vakhitov (Russian: Артё́м Оле́гович Вахи́тов; born April 4, 1991) is a Russian kickboxer who competes in the Light heavyweight division of Glory. Having begun practicing Muay Thai at eleven years old, Vakhitov first came to prominence due to a successful amateur career by winning three world championships as well as taking gold in 2013 at the World Combat Games. He turned professional in 2009, and signed with Glory in 2013, where he would twice be crowned the Glory Light Heavyweight Champion.

As of 2 February Vakhitov is ranked the #1 light-heavyweight and #4 pound-for-pound kickboxer in the world by Combat Press.

== Early life ==
Vakhitov was born in Prokopyevsk on April 4, 1991 and began basic martial arts training under his father's tutelage at the age of five years before going on to study karate at the age of six, which he practiced for five years. He was forced to give up karate aged eleven when he and his family moved to another part of the city, but he soon found the Kuzbass Muay Thai gym where he is trained by Vitaly Miller and is a training partner of Artem Levin. Vakhitov holds the classification of Master of Sports in Muay Thai, and is also a classically trained musician.

== Kickboxing career ==
=== Amateur ===
Vakhitov first came to prominence when he won the IFMA Russian Championships in 2008 aged seventeen. Following this, he would go on to win the Russian Championships four more times (2009, 2010, 2011, and 2013), the European Championships four times (2009, 2010, 2011, and 2012) and the World Championships three times (2010, 2011, and 2012).

He also won a silver medal in the -81 kg/178 lb division at the 2010 World Combat Games, held in Beijing, China between August 28 and September 4, 2010. After taking unanimous decision wins over Kim Olsen and Nurbolat Sengirov in the quarter-finals and semis, respectively, he then lost to Simon Marcus by split decision in the final.

Competing in the -91 kg/200 lb division at the 2013 World Combat Games in Saint Petersburg, Russia between October 18 and 26, 2013, Vakhitov outpointed Dzianis Hancharonak in the quarters, TKO'd Thomas Alizier and knocked out Emidio Barone with a knee in the final to take the gold medal.

=== Professional ===
==== Early years ====
In his first outing as a professional, Vakhitov competed in the Souboj Titánů tournament in Plzeň, Czech Republic on November 21, 2009, and made it to the final where he faced Jiri Zak. The bout was ruled a draw after the regulation three rounds and so it went to an extension round to decide the winner, after which Žák took the judges' decision.

The following year, he entered the Tatneft Cup 2010 at -80 kg/176 lb. After beating Saiseelek Nor-Seepun in the opening round on January 31, 2010, and Yordan Yankov in the quarter-finals on April 30, 2010, both by unanimous decision, Vakhitov then exited the competition when he was defeated by his longtime teammate Artem Levin in the semi-finals on July 29, 2010, retiring in his corner at the end of the third round. He then re-entered the tournament, however, when Levin was unable to fight Alexander Stetsurenko in the final due to injury and Vakhitov was selected as his replacement. In a close match on October 20, 2010, Vakhitov took Stetsurenko into an extension round before losing by UD.

Having signed with the short-lived Muaythai Premier League, Vakhitov made his promotional debut on September 2, 2011, at Muaythai Premier League: Stars and Stripes in Long Beach, California, United States where he rematched Simon Marcus. It was a closely contested affair but Marcus edged ahead by successfully scoring from the clinch with elbows and knees on various occasions to win a unanimous decision. He faced another familiar foe in his sophomore MPL appearance, taking on Jiri Zak at Muaythai Premier League: Blood and Steel in The Hague, Netherlands on November 6, 2011. He avenged his earlier loss to the Czech by winning via unanimous decision.

On December 2, 2011, Vakhitov won his first title as a professional, defeating Vando Cabral via TKO due to a cut caused by an elbow in round three at Battle of Champions 6 in Moscow, Russia to become the WMC European Super Light Heavyweight (-82.55 kg/182 lb) Champion.

He was set to replace Artem Levin in a fight with Joe Schilling for the WBC Muaythai Interim World Light Heavyweight Championship at Battle for the Belts in Bangkok, Thailand on June 9, 2012. He withdrew from the bout, however, after conceding that he would be unable to meet the -79.3 kg/175 lb weight limit and his place was taken by Karapet Karapetyan.

Continuing to move up in weight, Vakhitov beat Alexander Oleynik on points in a -91 kg/200 lb bout at the Alpha Cup in Moscow on May 18, 2013. It was the third meeting between the pair, with Vakhitov defeating Oleynik twice previously in the amateur ranks.

=== Glory ===
Vakhitov signed with Glory shortly after, as a competitor in the kickboxing organization's -95 kg/209 lb light heavyweight division. He gave an impressive performance in his first fight under the Glory banner, scoring an early knockdown over Luis Tavares before finishing him with a liver shot just over a minute into the first round at Glory 9: New York in New York City, New York, US on June 22, 2013.

He defeated fellow amateur standout Nenad Pagonis by unanimous decision at Glory 12: New York in New York City on November 23, 2013.

Vakhitov defeated Igor Jurković via UD at Glory 16: Denver in Broomfield, Colorado, US on May 3, 2014. He rematched Dzianis Hancharonak at Monte Carlo Fighting Masters 2014 in Monte Carlo, Monaco on June 14, 2014, winning by unanimous decision and taking the vacant WMC World Heavyweight (-95.0 kg/209 lb) Championship.

He was expected to fight against Andrei Stoica at Glory 20: Dubai on April 3, 2014. The Romanian withdrew for undisclosed reasons, however, and was replaced by Saulo Cavalari. Vakhitov lost the fight by split decision.

Vakhitov returned at Glory 25: Milan against Danyo Ilunga and won the fight by unanimous decision and won the opportunity to re-match Saulo Cavalari for the Glory Light Heavyweight championship.

==== Glory Light heavyweight title reign ====
Vakhitov successfully re-matched and defeated Saulo Cavalari by unanimous decision at Glory 28: Paris and won the Glory Light Heavyweight championship.

It was announced that Vakhitov would fight light heavyweight title contender Zack Mwekassa at Glory 35: Nice in France. Vakhitov successfully defended his championship and stopped Mwekassa by knocking him down three times; declaring Vakhitov the winner by TKO.

As his second title defense, Vakhitov was scheduled to rematch Saulo Cavalari at Glory 38: Chicago and dominated the fight, winning by TKO in the second round.

Vakhitov fought and successfully defended his Light Heavyweight championship against Brazilian contender, Ariel Machado at Glory 47: Lyon. Vakhitov knocked Machado down in the second round with a head kick, but after beating the 10 count, Vakhitov continued to beat Machado and won the fight by unanimous decision.

It was announced that Vakhitov would re-match former opponent Danyo Ilunga at Glory 56: Denver which will mark Vakhitov's fourth title fight in Glory. Vakhitov won the fight by unanimous decision. During the bout he injured his right hand, which kept him out of the ring for nearly a year.

He was scheduled to defend his title, for the fifth time, against Donegi Abena at Glory 66. He won the fight by split decision, although it was considered controversial by some fans. During the fight, Vakhitov once again injured his hand. As the repeated hand injuries kept him limited to just four appearances over the course of 29 months, he underwent surgery to repair the hand in July 2019.

==== Second Glory Light heavyweight title reign ====
Vakhitov attempted to make his sixth title defense against the then GLORY Middleweight and interim Light Heavyweight champion Alex Pereira at Glory 77. He lost the fight by split decision.

Due to the close nature of the match, Vakthitov called for a rematch. Glory granted his wish and scheduled the rematch with Pereira for Glory 78: Rotterdam on September 4, 2021. Vakhitov successfully regained the title with a majority decision victory. Vakthitov was the last boxer to defeat current UFC Light Heavyweight Champion and a former UFC Middleweight Champion Alex Pereira.

Vakhitov was booked to make his first title defense against the #1 light heavyweight contender Luis Tavares at Glory 80 on March 19, 2022. Vakhitov was rescheduled to face Tarik Khbabez in a non-title bout at the same event, after Tavares refused to face him due to the 2022 Russian invasion of Ukraine. Vakhitov withdrew from the bout on March 12.

Glory released Vakhitov from their roster on June 17, 2022, in protest of the 2022 Russian invasion of Ukraine.

==== Return to Glory ====
On November 17, 2022, it was announced that Vakhitov had signed with Muaythai Factory. He made his promotional debut against Pascal Toure on February 2, 2023. Vakhitov won the fight by unanimous decision.

In March 2025, it was reported that Vakhitov would compete for the Glory Heavyweight Championship against current champion Rico Verhoeven at Glory 100 on June 14, 2025. He lost the fight by unanimous decision.

== Mixed martial arts career ==
Vakhitov made his mixed martial arts debut on June 11, 2023, at Open FC 31 against Ashraf Bashandy. He lost the fight by a first-round technical knockout, as he dislocated his elbow 55 seconds into the bout.

Vakhitov faced Siyavush Salokhov on January 27, 2024 at WEF 130. He won the bout via technical knockout in the second round.

After another victory in February 2024, Vakhitov faced Islem Masraf on October 8, 2024 at Dana White's Contender Series 75. He won the fight via technical knockout in round one and secured a contract with Ultimate Fighting Championship after his rival Alex Pereira had recommended him.

On March 25, 2025, it was reported that Vakhitov declined the UFC's contract offer and had decided to return to kickboxing and Glory.

== Championships and awards ==
=== Kickboxing ===
- Glory
  - 2016 Glory Light Heavyweight (-95 kg/209 lb) Championship
    - Five successful title defenses
  - 2021 Glory Light Heavyweight (-95 kg/209 lb) Championship
- Battle of Champions
  - 2014 BOC (-95.5 kg/210 lb) Champion
- Tatneft Cup
  - Tatneft Cup 2010 –80 kg/176 lb Runner-up

=== Muay Thai ===
- International Federation of Muaythai Amateur
  - 2008 IFMA Russian Championships (gold)
  - 2009 IFMA Russian Championships (gold)
  - 2009 IFMA European Championships (gold)
  - 2010 IFMA Russian Championships (gold)
  - 2010 IFMA European Championships -81 kg/178 lb (gold)
  - 2010 IFMA World Championships -81 kg/178 lb (gold)
  - 2011 IFMA Russian Championships -86 kg/189 lb (gold)
  - 2011 IFMA European Championships -86 kg/189 lb (silver)
  - 2011 IFMA World Championships -81 kg/178 lb (gold)
  - 2012 IFMA European Championships (gold)
  - 2012 IFMA World Championships -86 kg/189 lb (gold)
  - 2013 IFMA Russian Championships -91 kg/200 lb (gold)
  - 2015 IFMA World Championships -91 kg/189 lb (gold)
- Russian Muay Thai Cup
  - 2009 Russian Muay Thai Cup (gold)
  - 2010 Russian Muay Thai Cup (gold)
  - 2011 Russian Muay Thai Cup (gold)
- World Combat Games
  - 2010 World Combat Games -81 kg/178 lb Muay Thai (silver)
  - 2013 World Combat Games -91 kg/200 lb Muay Thai (gold)
- World Muaythai Council
  - WMC European Super Light Heavyweight (-82.55 kg/182 lb) Championship
  - WMC World Heavyweight (-95.0 kg/209 lb) Championship

== Mixed martial arts record ==
Professional record breakdown
4 matches	3 wins	1 loss
By knockout	3	1

Res.	Record	Opponent	Method	Event	Date	Round	Time	Location	Notes
Win	3–1	Islem Masraf	TKO (punches)	Dana White's Contender Series 71	October 8, 2024	1	4:23	Las Vegas, Nevada, United States	
Win	2–1	Valisher Khambaev	TKO (leg kicks)	Naiza FC 57	February 24, 2024	1	0:23	Almaty, Kazakhstan	
Win	1–1	Huseyn Azizov	TKO (punches)	World Ertaymash Federation 130	January 27, 2024	1	1:23	Bishkek, Kyrgyzstan	
Loss	0–1	Ashraf Bashandy	TKO (arm injury)	Open Fighting Championship 31	June 11, 2023	1	0:55	Sheregesh, Russia	Light Heavyweight debut.

== Kickboxing and Muay Thai record ==
Professional kickboxing & Muay Thai record
23 wins (8 KOs), 8 losses, 0 draws
Date	Result	Opponent	Event	Location	Method	Round	Time	Record
2026-06-13	Loss	(Ghana) Michael Boapeah	Glory Collision 9 - Light Heavyweight Grand Prix, Quarterfinals	Rotterdam, Netherlands	Decision (unanimous)	3	3:00	23–8
2025-06-14	Loss	(Netherlands) Rico Verhoeven	Glory 100	Rotterdam, Netherlands	Decision (unanimous)	5	3:00	23–7
For the Glory Heavyweight Championship.
2023-02-02	Win	(France) Pascal Touré	Muaythai Factory	Kemerovo, Russia	Decision (unanimous)	3	3:00	23–6
2021-09-04	Win	(Brazil) Alex Pereira	Glory 78: Rotterdam	Rotterdam, Netherlands	Decision (majority)	5	3:00	22–6
Won the Glory Light Heavyweight Championship.
2021-01-30	Loss	(Brazil) Alex Pereira	Glory 77: Rotterdam	Rotterdam, Netherlands	Decision (split)	5	3:00	21–6
Lost the Glory Light Heavyweight Championship.
2019-06-22	Win	(Suriname) Donegi Abena	Glory 66: Paris	Paris, France	Decision (split)	5	3:00	21–5
Retains the Glory Light Heavyweight Championship.
2018-08-10	Win	(Democratic Republic of the Congo) Danyo Ilunga	Glory 56: Denver	Broomfield, Colorado, USA	Decision (unanimous)	5	3:00	20–5
Retains the Glory Light Heavyweight Championship.
2017-10-28	Win	(Brazil) Ariel Machado	Glory 47: Lyon	Lyon, France	Decision (unanimous)	5	3:00	19–5
Retains the Glory Light Heavyweight Championship.
2017-02-24	Win	(Brazil) Saulo Cavalari	Glory 38: Chicago	Hoffman Estates, Illinois, USA	TKO (punches)	2	2:43	18–5
Retains the Glory Light Heavyweight Championship.
2016-11-05	Win	(Democratic Republic of the Congo) Zack Mwekassa	Glory 35: Nice	Nice, France	TKO (three knockdowns)	2	2:23	17–5
Retains the Glory Light Heavyweight Championship.
2016-03-12	Win	(Brazil) Saulo Cavalari	Glory 28: Paris	Paris, France	Decision (unanimous)	5	3:00	16–5
Wins the Glory Light Heavyweight Championship.
2015-12-19	Win	(Spain) Lorenzo Javier Jorge	Muay Thai Moscow	Moscow, Russia	KO (straight left)	2		15–5
2015-11-06	Win	(Democratic Republic of the Congo) Danyo Ilunga	Glory 25: Milan	Monza, Italy	Decision (unanimous)	3	3:00	14–5
2015-04-03	Loss	(Brazil) Saulo Cavalari	Glory 20: Dubai	Dubai, UAE	Decision (split)	3	3:00	13–5
Light Heavyweight Title eliminator.
2014-11-21	Win	(Turkey) İbrahim Giydirir	Battle of Champions 7	Moscow, Russia	Decision (unanimous)	5	3:00	13–4
Wins Battle of Champions (-95.5 kg/210 lb) Championship.
2014-06-14	Win	(Belarus) Dzianis Hancharonak	Monte Carlo Fighting Masters 2014	Monte Carlo, Monaco	Decision (unanimous)	5	3:00	12–4
Wins the WMC World Heavyweight (-95.0 kg/209 lb) Championship.
2014-05-03	Win	(Croatia) Igor Jurković	Glory 16: Denver	Broomfield, Colorado, USA	Decision (unanimous)	3	3:00	11–4
2013-11-23	Win	(Serbia) Nenad Pagonis	Glory 12: New York	New York City, New York, USA	Decision (unanimous)	3	3:00	10–4
2013-06-22	Win	(Cape Verde) Luis Tavares	Glory 9: New York	New York City, New York, USA	KO (left hook to the body)	1	1:06	9–4
2013-05-18	Win	(Ukraine) Alexander Oleinik	Alpha Cup	Moscow, Russia	Decision	5	3:00	8–4
2011-12-02	Win	(Portugal) Vando Cabral	Battle of Champions 6	Moscow, Russia	TKO (cut)	3		
Wins the WMC European Super Light Heavyweight (-82.55 kg/182 lb) Championship.
2011-11-06	Win	(Czech Republic) Jiri Zak	Muaythai Premier League: Blood and Steel	The Hague, Netherlands	Decision (unanimous)	3	3:00	
2011-09-02	Loss	(Canada) Simon Marcus	Muaythai Premier League: Stars and Stripes	Long Beach, California, USA	Decision (unanimous)	3	3:00	
2010-10-20	Loss	(Russia) Alexander Stetsurenko	Tatneft Cup 2010 Part 7, Final	Kazan, Russia	Ext. Round Decision (unanimous)	6	3:00	
For the Tatneft Cup 2010 -80 kg/176 lb Championship.
2010-07-29	Loss	(Russia) Artem Levin	Tatneft Cup 2010 Part 6, Semi Finals	Kazan, Russia	Decision (unanimous)	3	3:00	
2010-04-30	Win	(Bulgaria) Yordan Yankov	Tatneft Cup 2010 Part 4, Quarter Finals	Kazan, Russia	Decision (unanimous)	4	3:00	
2010-01-31	Win	(Thailand) Saiseelek Nor-Sreepun	Tatneft Cup 2010 Part 2, First Round	Kazan, Russia	Decision (unanimous)	4	3:00	
2009-11-21	Loss	(Czech Republic) Jiri Zak	Souboj Titánů, Semifinals	Plzeň, Czech Republic	Ext. Round Decision	4	3:00	
2009-11-21	Win	(Portugal) Leonildo Evora	Souboj Titánů, Quarterfinals	Plzeň, Czech Republic	Ext. Round Decision	4	3:00	

Amateur Muay Thai record
88 wins (? KOs), 4 losses, 0 draws
Date	Result	Opponent	Event	Location	Method	Round	Time
2015-08-	Win	(Germany) Jakob Styben	2015 IFMA World Championships, Final	Bangkok, Thailand	Decision	3	3:00
Wins the 2015 IFMA World Championships -91 kg/189 lb Gold Medal.
2015-08-	Win	(Ukraine) Oleg Pryimachov	2015 IFMA World Championships, Semi Final	Bangkok, Thailand	Decision	3	3:00
2015-08-	Win	(Belarus) Dzianis Hancharonak	2015 IFMA World Championships, Quarter Final	Bangkok, Thailand	Decision	3	3:00
2013-10-23	Win	(Italy) Emidio Barone	2013 World Combat Games -91 kg/200 lb Muay Thai, Final	Saint Petersburg, Russia	KO (knee)		
Wins the 2013 World Combat Games -91 kg/200 lb Muay Thai Gold Medal.
2013-10-21	Win	(France) Thomas Alizier	2013 World Combat Games -91 kg/200 lb Muay Thai, Semi Finals	Saint Petersburg, Russia	TKO (corner stoppage)	1	
2013-10-19	Win	(Belarus) Dzianis Hancharonak	2013 World Combat Games -91 kg/200 lb Muay Thai, Quarter Finals	Saint Petersburg, Russia	Decision	3	3:00
2013-08-00	Win	(Russia) Vladimir Mineev	2013 IFMA Russian Championships, Final	Kemerovo, Russia	TKO (broken nose)		
Wins the 2013 IFMA Russian Championships -91 kg/200 lb Gold Medal.
2012-09-13	Win	(Sweden) Sadibou Sy	2012 IFMA World Championships, Final	Saint Petersburg, Russia	Decision	4	2:00
Wins the 2012 IFMA World Championships -86 kg/189 lb Gold Medal.
2012-09-11	Win	(Belarus) Andrey Gerasimchuk	2012 IFMA World Championships, Semi Finals	Saint Petersburg, Russia	Decision		
2012-09-	Win	(Iraq) Fallah Madji	2012 IFMA World Championships, Quarter Finals	Saint Petersburg, Russia	TKO (retirement)	1	2:00
2012-05-23	Win	(Ukraine) Alexander Oleinik	2012 IFMA European Championships -86 kg/189 lb, Final	Antalya, Turkey	Decision	4	2:00
Wins 2012 IFMA European Championships -86kg Gold Medal.
2011-09-27	Win	(Belarus) Dmitry Abdulin	2011 IFMA World Championships, Final	Tashkent, Uzbekistan	Decision	4	2:00
Wins 2011 IFMA World Championships -81kg Gold Medal.
2011-09-25	Win	(Sweden) Abdoulie Joof	2011 IFMA World Championships, Semi Finals	Tashkent, Uzbekistan	Decision	4	2:00
2011-09-22	Win	(Iran) Ali Afzali	2011 IFMA World Championships, Quarter Finals	Tashkent, Uzbekistan	Decision	4	2:00
2011-04-00	Loss	(Belarus) Andrey Gerasimchuk	2011 IFMA European Championships -86 kg/189 lb, Final	Antalya, Turkey	Decision	4	2:00
Wins 2011 IFMA European Championships -86kg Silver Medal.
2011-04-00	Win	(Ukraine) Alexander Oleinik	2011 IFMA European Championships -86 kg/189 lb, Semi Finals	Antalya, Turkey	Decision	4	2:00
2011-04-00	Win	(Germany) Priest West	2011 IFMA European Championships -86 kg/189 lb, Quarter Finals	Antalya, Turkey	Decision	4	2:00
2011-00-00	Win	(Russia) Ivan Lentka	2011 IFMA Russian Championships -86 kg/189 lb	Russia	Decision	4	2:00
Wins the 2011 IFMA Russian Championships -86 kg/189 lb.
2010-12-	Win	(Belarus) Dzmitry Abdulin	2010 I.F.M.A. World Muaythai Championships, Finals	Bangkok, Thailand			
Wins 2010 IFMA World Championships -81kg Gold Medal.
2010-12-	Win		2010 I.F.M.A. World Muaythai Championships, Semi Finals	Bangkok, Thailand			
2010-00-00	Loss	(Canada) Simon Marcus	2010 World Combat Games -81 kg/178 lb Muay Thai, Final	Beijing, China	Decision (split)	4	2:00
Wins the 2010 World Combat Games -81 kg/178 lb Muay Thai Silver Medal.
2010-00-00	Win	(Kazakhstan) Nurbolat Sengirov	2010 World Combat Games -81 kg/178 lb Muay Thai, Semi Finals	Beijing, China	Decision (unanimous)	4	2:00
2010-00-00	Win	(Australia) Kim Olsen	2010 World Combat Games -81 kg/178 lb Muay Thai, Quarter Finals	Beijing, China	Decision (unanimous)	4	2:00
2010-05-00	Win	(Ukraine) Pavel Kharchenko	2010 IFMA European Championships -81 kg/178 lb, Final	Italy	TKO (cut)	1	0:58
Wins the 2010 IFMA European Championships -81 kg/178 lb Gold Medal.
Legend: Win Loss Draw/No contest Notes
