= Tyrone Spong =

Surinamese martial artist (born 1985)

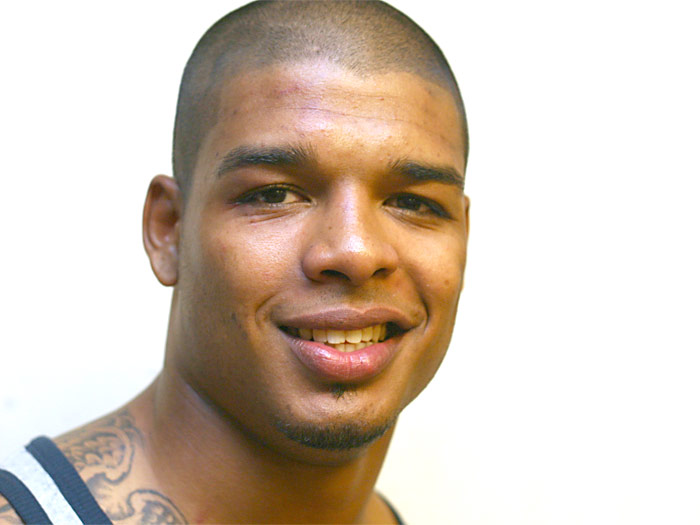
- Born: Tyrone Clinton Spong; 3 September 1985 (age 41); Paramaribo, Suriname
- Other names: King of the Ring
- Height: 6 ft 2 in (188 cm)
- Weight: 228 lb (103 kg; 16 st 4 lb)
- Division: Welterweight; Middleweight; Light heavyweight Cruiserweight (boxing); Heavyweight
- Reach: 74 in (188 cm)
- Style: Kickboxing; Boxing
- Stance: Orthodox
- Fighting out of: Boca Raton, Florida, U.S.
- Team: Kill Cliff FC; Blackzilians (2011–2016); Team Mr. Perfect (2009–2011); Fighting Factory Carbin (2001–2009)
- Trainer: Henri Hooft; Ernesto Hoost; Lucien Carbin
- Years active: 2001–2014 (Kickboxing); 2012–2013, 2021 (MMA); 2015–2019 (Boxing)

Professional boxing record
- Total: 14
- Wins: 14
- By knockout: 13
- Losses: 0

Kickboxing record
- Total: 116
- Wins: 107
- By knockout: 73
- Losses: 7
- By knockout: 4
- Draws: 1
- No contests: 1

Mixed martial arts record
- Total: 3
- Wins: 2
- By knockout: 1
- By decision: 1
- Losses: 1
- By knockout: 1

Other information
- Website: http://www.tyrone-spong.nl
- Boxing record from BoxRec
- Mixed martial arts record from Sherdog
- Last updated on: 12 April 2014

Tyrone Clinton Spong (born 3 September 1985) is a Surinamese-Dutch former kickboxer, professional boxer and mixed martial artist. In kickboxing, he is the former WFCA cruiserweight champion, Glory 95kg Slam Champion and It's Showtime 95MAX World champion. As a boxer, he held the WBC and WBO Latino heavyweight titles in 2018.

== Early life ==
Tyrone Spong was born in Suriname. In 1990 at the age of five, he moved to the Netherlands with his family. Growing up in the Bijlmermeer neighborhood of Amsterdam, he was often involved in street fighting and began training in kickboxing at the age of thirteen, under the guidance of Lucien Carbin. After getting his "ass whooped" in his first day of training, he was motivated to improve. He had his first match at fifteen and won by first-round knockout. Some of his early sparring partners included Alistair and Valentijn Overeem, and Gilbert Yvel.

== Kickboxing career ==
In 2003, his first year as a professional, Spong won 12 fights. In 2004, he fought Rafi Zouheir at the Battle of Zaandam, winning his first European Muay Thai Title (World Kickboxing Network). In 2004, Spong visited Japan to compete in Shootboxing, losing to Ryuji Goto via unanimous decision. His next fight, in April 2005, was against Belgian Mohammed Ouali for another European Title (WPKL). Spong won the fight by unanimous decision.

In December 2005, at the A-1 Combat Cup in Duisburg, Spong won his first tournament Championship after winning three consecutive fights by knockout.

In 2006, Spong had two significant victories, knockout wins over Muay Thai veteran Joerie Mes and, two weeks later, K-1 fighter Kaoklai Kaennorsing, from Thailand.

In 2007, Spong won the SLAMM world title up to 79 kg by defeating the Thai Yodchai Wor Petchpun via first-round TKO. In the following match, he defeated the Belarusian Dmitry Shakuta.

On 26 January 2008 Spong won the World Full Contact Association (WFCA) World Thaiboxing Cruiserweight Championship by defeating Aurelien Duarte. Following this, he won the KO World Series 2008 by defeating Nikos Sokolis via knockout in the first round, and defended his WFCA Muay Thai title by finishing Ondrej Hutnik with a left liver punch in the second round. On 26 April 2008 Spong faced Azem Maksutaj at the K-1 World Grand Prix 2008 in Amsterdam, winning by knockout in the second round. He then defeated Gary Turner via TKO in the first round. On 29 November 2008 he became the inaugural It's Showtime 95MAX World champion after beating Zabit Samedov by unanimous decision.

On 28 March 2009 Spong participated in the first K-1 Heavyweight (−100 kg) Title tournament, held in Yokohama, Japan. He was beaten in the semifinals by Gokhan Saki, who won by KO in the extra round.

Spong met Nathan Corbett at Champions of Champions II on 27 June 2009, in what was widely considered a battle between the two best Muay Thai fighters in the world at their weight class, for the W.M.C. world title −93 kg. The fight was close, with Spong knocking Corbett down in the second round, and ended with a controversial decision. In the third round, Corbett knocked Spong out with a right hook causing the referee to stop the fight. However, due to the referee's misleading hand signals, Corbett rushed back in and knock Spong down once more, not sure that the fight had been stopped. After considerable confusion, the fight was declared a no contest.

After defeating the Worlds heavyweight champion, Kyotaro, on 5 December 2009, Spong fought Jerome Le Banner in April 2010. Similarly to the Corbett fight, Spong broke his right hand in the first round and was knocked down. Despite coming back strongly, he lost by decision. At the end of the year, he qualified for the K-1 World Grand Prix 2010 Final, defeating veteran Ray Sefo in an elimination match, only to lose to eventual winner Alistair Overeem at the quarter final stage in what was a more competitive fight than most had predicted, as Overeem was much the bigger fighter. At the start of 2011, Spong had to vacate the It's Showtime 95MAX world title due to a number of issues, such as not having had a title defense in the allocated two years and his management stating that he had moved up in weight to fight as a heavyweight.

Spong knocked out Igor Mihaljevic with a left knee in the first round at It's Showtime 2011 Lyon on 14 May 2011. He defeated Loren Javier Jorge by unanimous decision at It's Showtime Madrid 2011 on 18 June 2011.

Spong faced Melvin Manhoef at It's Showtime 2012 in Leeuwarden on 28 January 2012 and won by unanimous decision. He faced the legendary Dutchman Peter Aerts at an It's Showtime event in Brussels, Belgium, on 30 June 2012 and won by knockout in the third round.

Spong fought Remy Bonjasky at Glory 5: London in London, England, on 23 March 2013. Spong won via one-punch KO with a right hook in the second round.

Spong returned to 95 kg to fight in the Glory 9: New York - 2013 95kg Slam in New York City, New York, United States on 22 June 2013. He had a scare in the quarter-finals when he was dropped by Michael Duut soon after the bout started, although it was not counted by the referee. Just moments after returning to his feet, Spong landed a crushing right hand on Duut, knocking Duut out and ensuring Spong's passage to the semifinals against Filip Verlinden. The Verlinden match was a technical battle, with Spong outpointing the Belgian and taking a unanimous decision. A match with Danyo Ilunga awaited him in the final but it ended in a controversial and anticlimactic fashion. As the fight began, both fighters met in the center of the ring and Spong unloaded a flurry of punches. As Ilunga covered up and prepared to counter, referee Mufadel Elghazaoui jumped in and stopped the fight, giving Spong the TKO win at just sixteen seconds of the first round. Although, it was later revealed that there was a "no standing eight count" rule in effect at the event as per the New York State Athletic Commission's regulations, the stoppage was still deemed premature by much of the kickboxing community.

In a long-awaited rematch, Spong fought Corbett again at Glory 11: Chicago - Heavyweight World Championship Tournament in Hoffman Estates, Illinois, United States on 12 October 2013. Spong dropped Corbett twice with left hooks and won by second-round TKO .

Spong fought in the Glory 15: Istanbul - Light Heavyweight World Championship Tournament in Istanbul, Turkey on 12 April 2014, competing for the inaugural Glory Light Heavyweight Championship. After defeating Saulo Cavalari via unanimous decision in the semifinals, he then faced Gökhan Saki in a highly anticipated rematch in the final. Midway through the opening round, Spong threw a kick to Saki's left leg. Saki checked the kick, causing Spong's lower right leg to fracture immediately and end the fight via TKO.

Spong underwent surgery to repair his broken leg and returned to training in October 2014. On 14 April 2016 he announced that he had retired from kickboxing and was looking forward to new challenges.

== Mixed martial arts career ==
=== World Series of Fighting ===
Spong made his highly anticipated MMA debut against Travis Bartlett at World Series of Fighting 1 on 3 November 2012 in Las Vegas, Nevada, in the light heavyweight (205 lb) division. For his MMA debut he trained with the Blackzilians for over a year with such fighters as K-1 World Grand Prix winner and former Strikeforce heavyweight champion Alistair Overeem and former UFC light heavyweight champions Rashad Evans and Vitor Belfort. Spong knocked out Bartlett at 3:15 of the first round with a straight right.

Spong faced Angel DeAnda at World Series of Fighting 4 on 10 August 2013 in the main event. Spong won via unanimous decision.

=== Eagle Fighting Championship ===
Spong was scheduled to face Bigfoot Silva on 28 January 2022 at EFC 44. However, Silva pulled out of the bout and was replaced by Sergei Kharitonov. Spong lost the fight by technical knockout in the second round.

=== Karate Combat ===
Spong was seen and interviewed at Karate Combat 52 in Miami and expressed interest in fighting for the promotion, stating that he thinks Karate Combat 'is the future'. He told the interviewer the promotion is 'fan-friendly' and 'perfect for his style of fighting'.

During the broadcast of Karate Combat 53, it was announced that Spong would fight for the Karate Combat Heavyweight Championship against the reigning champion Sam Alvey at Karate Combat 54 in Dubai on May 2, 2025. He lost the fight by knockout in the second round.

== Boxing career ==
Spong decided to begin a career in professional boxing at age 29. His first boxing match was on 6 March 2015, beating Gabor Farkas by KO in the first round. Spong defeated Juan Carlos Salas by KO in Round 1 at Brave Warriors in Action PPV event on 27 May 2017 in Mexico. On 7 October 2017 Spong won the WBC Latino Heavyweight Championship.

=== Spong vs. Silgado ===
On 31 August 2018 Spong defeated Santander Silago via KO in the first round.

=== Spong vs. Perea ===
In his next fight, Spong defeated Ytalo Perea via split decision. The scorecards read 97–93, 96–94 and 94–96 in favor of Spong.

=== Spong vs. Minda ===
His following bout came against Jeyson Minda. Spong ended the bout early via a second-round KO.

Spong was due to face Oleksandr Usyk on 12 October 2019 but the bout was called off after Spong tested positive for the banned substance clomifene. However, his third sample, which was tested by VADA, came back negative.

== Titles ==
=== Kickboxing ===
- Glory
  - 2014 Glory Light Heavyweight World Championship Tournament Runner-up
  - 2013 Glory 95kg Slam Tournament Champion
- It's Showtime
  - 2008 1st It's Showtime World 95MAX champion (defense: 0)
- World Full Contact Association
  - 2008 World Full Contact Association (W.F.C.A.) Thaiboxing World Cruiserweight champion (defense: 1)
- KO World Series
  - 2008 KO World Series '08 Oceania winner
- SLAMM!! Events
  - 2007 1st SLAMM Events 79 kg class champion (defense: 0)
- A1 World League
  - 2005 A1 World League winner
- World Professional Kickboxing League
  - 2005 W.P.K.L. European Middleweight champion (defense: 0)
- World Kickboxing Network
  - 2004 World Kickboxing Network (W.K.N.) Thaiboxing European Middleweight champion (defense: 0)
- Muay Thai Bond Nederland
  - M.T.B.N. Muay Thai Dutch Junior class −66 kg class champion (defense: 0)

Awards

- 2013 Kickboxingplanet.com Kickboxer of the Year
- 2013 Liver Kick.com Fighter of the Year

Boxing

- 2017 WBC Latino Heavyweight Champion
- 2018 WBO Latino Heavyweight Champion

== Personal life ==
Spong has four children.

He is an avid animal enthusiast, as is evidenced by the majority of his tattoos. He is the owner of several pit bull terriers, which he bred himself.

Spong has trained in the United States with Floyd Mayweather Sr.

He has been decorated with the Honorary Order of the Yellow Star, the highest order of Suriname, by President Dési Bouterse.

== Professional boxing record ==
| 14 fights | 14 wins | 0 losses |
|---|---|---|
| By knockout | 13 | 0 |
| By decision | 1 | 0 |

| No. | Result | Record | Opponent | Type | Round, time | Date | Location | Notes |
|---|---|---|---|---|---|---|---|---|
| 14 | Win | 14–0 | Jeyson Minda | TKO | 2 (10), 1:42 | 31 Aug 2019 | Gimnasio Polifuncional, Merida, Mexico | |
| 13 | Win | 13–0 | Ytalo Perea | SD | 10 | 21 Dec 2018 | Anthony Nesty Sporthal, Paramaribo, Suriname | Retained WBC Latino and WBO Latino heavyweight titles |
| 12 | Win | 12–0 | Santander Silgado | KO | 1 (10), 1:14 | 31 Aug 2018 | Convention Center, West Palm Beach, Florida, U.S. | Retained WBC Latino and WBO Latino heavyweight titles |
| 11 | Win | 11–0 | Carlos Nascimento | KO | 5 (10), 1:53 | 24 Feb 2018 | Domo Unidad Deportiva del F.U.T.V., Merida, Mexico | Retained WBC Latino heavyweight title; Won vacant WBO Latino heavyweight title |
| 10 | Win | 10–0 | Sergio Ramirez | KO | 1 (8), 2:54 | 7 Oct 2017 | Domo Unidad Deportiva del F.U.T.V., Merida, Mexico | Won WBC Latino heavyweight title |
| 9 | Win | 9–0 | Juan Carlos Salas | KO | 1 (6), 1:44 | 27 May 2017 | Polyforum Zam Ná, Mérida, Mexico | |
| 8 | Win | 8–0 | Jose Felix | TKO | 1 (8), 1:34 | 18 Apr 2017 | Casa de los Clubes, Santo Domingo, Dominican Republic | |
| 7 | Win | 7–0 | Carlos Rodriguez | TKO | 1 (8), 1:06 | 31 Mar 2017 | Coliseo Pepe Mayen, San Pedro de Macoris, Dominican Republic | |
| 6 | Win | 6–0 | Hugo Leon | KO | 3 (6), 0:36 | 4 Sep 2016 | Club Deportivo Ferrocarrilero, Aguascalientes City, Mexico | |
| 5 | Win | 5–0 | Tracey Johnson | TKO | 2 (6), 1:41 | 6 Aug 2016 | Doubletree Miamimart Hotel, Miami, Florida, U.S. | |
| 4 | Win | 4–0 | Lucas Queen | KO | 1 (4), 1:04 | 1 Apr 2016 | War Memorial Auditorium, Fort Lauderdale, Florida, U.S. | |
| 3 | Win | 3–0 | David Gogishvili | TKO | 2 (4), 1:05 | 5 Mar 2016 | Colosseum Sport Hall, Grozny, Russia | |
| 2 | Win | 2–0 | Emre Altintas | TKO | 1 (4), 1:54 | 21 Mar 2015 | Unihalle Wuppertal, Nordrhein-Westfalen, Germany | |
| 1 | Win | 1–0 | Gabor Farkas | KO | 1 (4), 1:14 | 6 Mar 2015 | Bruno Gehrke Halle, Berlin, Germany | |

== Kickboxing and Muay Thai record ==
ProfessionalkKickboxing and Muay Thai record
107 wins (73 (T)KOs, 34 decisions), 7 losses (4 (T)KOs, 3 decisions), 1 draw, 1 no contest
| Date | Result | Opponent | Event | Location | Method | Round | Time |
| 2014-04-12 | Loss | (Turkey) Gökhan Saki | Glory 15: Istanbul – Light Heavyweight World Championship Tournament, Final | Istanbul, Turkey | TKO (leg injury) | 1 | 1:39 |
For the Glory Light Heavyweight Championship and the Glory Light Heavyweight World Championship Tournament.
| 2014-04-12 | Win | (Brazil) Saulo Cavalari | Glory 15: Istanbul – Light Heavyweight World Championship Tournament, Semi Finals | Istanbul, Turkey | Decision (unanimous) | 3 | 3:00 |
| 2013-10-12 | Win | (Australia) Nathan Corbett | Glory 11: Chicago | Hoffman Estates, Illinois, USA | TKO (left hook) | 2 | 1:10 |
| 2013-06-22 | Win | (Germany) Danyo Ilunga | Glory 9: New York – 95 kg Slam Tournament, Finals | New York City, New York, USA | TKO (punches) | 1 | 0:16 |
Wins the Glory 95kg Slam Tournament.
| 2013-06-22 | Win | (Belgium) Filip Verlinden | Glory 9: New York – 95 kg Slam Tournament, Semi Finals | New York City, New York, USA | Decision (unanimous) | 3 | 3:00 |
| 2013-06-22 | Win | (Netherlands) Michael Duut | Glory 9: New York – 95 kg Slam Tournament, Quarter Finals | New York City, New York, USA | KO (right hook) | 1 | 0:31 |
| 2013-03-23 | Win | (Netherlands) Remy Bonjasky | Glory 5: London | London, England | KO (right hook) | 2 | 2:02 |
| 2012-06-30 | Win | (Netherlands) Peter Aerts | Music Hall & BFN Group present: It's Showtime 57 & 58 | Brussels, Belgium | KO (punch) | 3 | 2:10 |
| 2012-01-28 | Win | (Netherlands) Melvin Manhoef | It's Showtime 2012 in Leeuwarden | Amsterdam, Netherlands | Decision (unanimous) | 3 | 3:00 |
| 2011-06-18 | Win | (Spain) Loren Javier Jorge | It's Showtime Madrid 2011 | Madrid, Spain | Decision (unanimous) | 3 | 3:00 |
| 2011-05-14 | Win | (Croatia) Igor Mihaljevic | It's Showtime 2011 Lyon | Lyon, France | KO (left knee) | 1 | 2:01 |
| 2010-12-11 | Loss | (Netherlands) Alistair Overeem | K-1 World GP 2010 Final, Quarter Final | Tokyo, Japan | Decision (unanimous) | 3 | 3:00 |
| 2010-10-02 | Win | (New Zealand) Ray Sefo | K-1 World GP 2010 Seoul Final 16 | Seoul, Republic of Korea | Decision (unanimous) | 3 | 3:00 |
Qualifies for K-1 World Grand Prix 2010 Final.
| 2010-04-03 | Loss | (France) Jerome Le Banner | K-1 World Grand Prix 2010 in Yokohama | Yokohama, Japan | Decision (unanimous) | 3 | 3:00 |
| 2009-12-05 | Win | (Japan) Keijiro Maeda | K-1 World Grand Prix 2009 Final | Yokohama, Japan | Decision (unanimous) | 3 | 3:00 |
| 2009-06-27 | NC | (Australia) Nathan Corbett | Champions of Champions II | Montego Bay, Jamaica | No contest | 3 | 0:55 |
| 2009-05-16 | Win | (Hungary) Attila Karacs | It's Showtime 2009 Amsterdam | Amsterdam, Netherlands | Decision (split) | 3 | 3:00 |
| 2009-03-28 | Loss | (Turkey) Gökhan Saki | K-1 World GP 2009 in Yokohama | Yokohama, Japan | KO (right hook) | 4 | 1:58 |
| 2009-01-24 | Win | (Morocco) Samir Benazzouz | Beast of the East | Zutphen, Netherlands | TKO (corner stoppage) | 3 | 2:23 |
| 2008-11-29 | Win | (Azerbaijan) Zabit Samedov | It's Showtime 2008 Eindhoven | Eindhoven, Netherlands | Decision (unanimous) | 5 | 3:00 |
Wins It's Showtime 95MAX World title.
| 2008-10-05 | Win | (England) Gary Turner | K.O. Events "Tough Is Not Enough" | Rotterdam, Netherlands | TKO (doctor stoppage) | 1 | 1:05 |
| 2008-04-26 | Win | (Albania) Azem Maksutaj | K-1 World GP 2008 in Amsterdam | Amsterdam, Netherlands | KO (knee strike) | 2 | 0:45 |
| 2008-03-15 | Win | (Czech Republic) Ondrej Hutnik | It's Showtime 75MAX Trophy 2008, World Title Fight | 's-Hertogenbosch, Netherlands | KO (Left liver punch) | 2 | 2:32 |
Retains title of (W.F.C.A.) World Thaiboxing Cruiserweight championship.
| 2008-02-09 | Win | (Greece) Nikos Sokolis | KO World Series 2008 in Auckland | Auckland, New Zealand | KO (left liver punch) | 1 | 2:25 |
Wins KO World Series 2008 in Auckland Cruiserweight world title.
| 2008-02-09 | Win | (England) Chad Walker | KO World Series 2008 in Auckland | Auckland, New Zealand | KO (overhand right) | 1 | 1:08 |
| 2008-01-26 | Win | (Senegal) Aurelien Duarte | Beast of the East | Zutphen, Netherlands | Decision (unanimous) | 3 | 3:00 |
Wins vacant title of (W.F.C.A.) World Thaiboxing Cruiserweight (−86.18kg) title.
| 2007-12-24 | Win | (Denmark) Rasmus Zoeylner | Return of the King 2 | Paramaribo, Suriname | KO (strikes) | 2 | N/A |
| 2007-10-27 | Win | (Croatia) Emil Zoraj | One Night in Bangkok | Antwerp, Belgium | TKO (doctor stoppage) | 4 | 1:02 |
| 2007-08-26 | Win | (Iran) Human Nikmaslak | Return of the King 1 | Paramaribo, Suriname | KO (knee strike) | 1 | 2:31 |
| 2007-06-02 | Win | (Belarus) Dmitry Shakuta | Gentleman Fight Night IV | Tilburg, Netherlands | Decision | 5 | 3:00 |
| 2007-05-06 | Win | (Thailand) Yodchai Wor Petchpun | SLAMM "Nederland vs Thailand III" | Haarlem, Netherlands | TKO (referee stoppage) | 1 | 2:38 |
Wins the vacant title of SLAMM World 79kg title.
| 2007-03-25 | Loss | (Egypt) Amir Zeyada | Rings Gala, Vechtsenbanen | Utrecht, Netherlands | TKO (referee stoppage/punches) | 3 | 1:49 |
| 2006-11-12 | Win | (Netherlands) Joerie Mes | Pride & Honor Ahoy 2006 | Rotterdam, Netherlands | TKO (knee) | 5 | 1:12 |
| 2006-10-01 | Win | (Thailand) Kaoklai Kaennorsing | SLAMM "Nederland vs Thailand II" | Almere, Netherlands | KO (right punch) | 1 | 1:55 |
| 2006-06-18 | Win | (Netherlands) Sem Braan | 2H2H The Road To Tokyo | Amsterdam, Netherlands | KO (left hook) | 3 | 1:40 |
| 2006-06-03 | Win | (Netherlands) Henry Akdeniz | Gentleman Fight Night 3 | Tilburg, Netherlands | TKO (doctor stoppage) | 3 | 3:00 |
| 2006-05-06 | Win | (France) Farid M'Laika | Gala de Kickboxing | Geneva, Switzerland | Decision (unanimous) | 5 | 2:00 |
| 2006-04-29 | Win | (South Korea) Cho In Jun | MARS World Fighting GP | Seoul, Korea | KO (strikes) | 1 | 2:07 |
| 2005-12-03 | Win | (Turkey) Senol Kiziltas | A-1 Combat League | Duisburg, Germany | TKO (knee) | 2 | N/A |
Wins A-1 Combat League World title.
| 2005-12-03 | Win | (Turkey) Senol Cetin | A-1 Combat League | Duisburg, Germany | TKO (corner stoppage) | 1 | N/A |
| 2005-12-03 | Win | (Ukraine) Rene Litchko | A-1 Combat League | Duisburg, Germany | KO (right hook) | 1 | 0:45 |
| 2005-10-09 | Win | (Netherlands) Vincent Vielvoye | Rotterdam Rumble | Rotterdam, Netherlands | Decision | 5 | 3:00 |
| 2005-05-08 | Win | (Morocco) Youness El Mhassani | Muay Thai Gala | Amsterdam, Netherlands | Decision | 5 | 3:00 |
| 2005-04-09 | Win | (Morocco) Mohammed Ouali | Muay Thai Champions League XIV | Netherlands | Decision | 5 | 3:00 |
Wins title of W.P.K.L. European Middleweight (−72.5kg) championship.
| 2004-12-23 | Win | (Curaçao) Renato Hasset | The Night of Legend | Paramaribo, Suriname | KO (strikes) | 4 | N/A |
| 2004-11-14 | Win | (England) Richard Weston | Muay Thai/Mixed Fight Gala, Sporthal Stedenwijk | Almere, Netherlands | KO (strikes) | 1 | N/A |
| 2004-10-17 | Win | (Morocco) Rafi Zoufeir | Battle in Zaandam II | Zaandam, Netherlands | TKO (low kicks) | 3 | N/A |
Wins title of W.K.N. Thaiboxing European Middleweight (−76.2kg) championship.
| 2004-04-18 | Loss | (Japan) Ryuji Goto | Shoot boxing: Infinity-S Vol.2 | Tokyo, Japan | Decision | 3 | 3:00 |
| 2004-03-21 | Win | (Morocco) Hamid El Caid | Profighters Gala in Almere | Almere, Netherlands | Decision | 5 | 3:00 |
| 2004-02-22 | Win | (Netherlands) William Diender | 2H2H | Rotterdam, Netherlands | Decision (majority) | 5 | 3:00 |
| 2003-11-12 | Draw | (Morocco) Youness El Mhassani | Veni, Vidi, Vici II | Veenendaal, Netherlands | Draw | 5 | 3:00 |
| 2003-11-02 | Win | (Belgium) Xavier Gatez | Immortality | Amsterdam, Netherlands | KO (strikes) | 2 | N/A |
| 2003-10-13 | Win | (Netherlands) Rocky Grandjean | 2H2H in Ahoy | Netherlands | TKO (doctor stoppage) | 2 | N/A |
| 2003-07-04 | Win | (Curaçao) Gregory Costina | Baas Sports | Willemstad, Curaçao | TKO (low kicks) | 4 | N/A |
| 2003-05-18 | Win | (Netherlands) Melvin Rozenblad | Killerdome III | Amsterdam, Netherlands | Decision | 5 | 3:00 |
A-class debut.
| 2003-04-19 | Win | (Netherlands) Henry Akdeniz | Beast of The East | Zutphen, Netherlands | TKO (corner stoppage) | 1 | 3:00 |
| 2003-04-13 | Win | (Belgium) Jan van Denderen | East Side III | Gorinchem, Netherlands | Decision | 5 | 2:00 |
| 2003-02-02 | Win | (Netherlands) Harry Lodewijks | Killerdome II | Amsterdam, Netherlands | KO (strikes) | 1 | N/A |
| 2003-01-11 | Win | (Morocco) Tarik Slimani | Dudok Arena | Hilversum, Netherlands | N/A | N/A | N/A |
| 2002-10-27 | Win | (Netherlands) Ray Staring | Beast of The East | Arnhem, Netherlands | Decision | 5 | 2:00 |
| 2002-05-19 | Loss | (Egypt) Amir Zeyada | Itai-Te Promotions, Thaiboksgala Predators III | Amsterdam, Netherlands | KO (slam) | 4 | 0:47 |
| 2002-03-08 | Win | (Netherlands) Dave van der Ploeg | Beast of The East | Zutphen, Netherlands | Decision | 5 | 2:00 |
| 2002-03-03 | Win | (Germany) Olli Koch | Loasana Promotions, The Palace | Groningen, Netherlands | KO (strikes) | 1 | N/A |
| 2001-09-22 | Win | (Netherlands) Werner Stoel | Champions Gym Gala in Hanenhof | Geleen, Netherlands | Decision | 5 | 2:00 |
Legend: Win Loss Draw/no contest Notes

== Mixed martial arts record ==
Professional record breakdown
| 3 matches | 2 wins | 1 loss |
| By knockout | 1 | 1 |
| By decision | 1 | 0 |

| Res. | Record | Opponent | Method | Event | Date | Round | Time | Location | Notes |
|---|---|---|---|---|---|---|---|---|---|
| Loss | 2–1 | Sergei Kharitonov | TKO (punches) | Eagle FC 44 | 28 January 2022 | 2 | 2:55 | Miami, Florida, United States | Heavyweight debut. |
| Win | 2–0 | Angel DeAnda | Decision (unanimous) | WSOF 4 | 10 August 2013 | 3 | 5:00 | Ontario, California, United States | |
| Win | 1–0 | Travis Bartlett | KO (punch) | WSOF 1 | 3 November 2012 | 1 | 3:15 | Paradise, Nevada, United States | Light Heavyweight debut. |

== Karate Combat record ==
Professional record breakdown
| 1 match | 0 wins | 1 loss |
| By knockout | 0 | 1 |

| Res. | Record | Opponent | Method | Event | Date | Round | Time | Location | Notes |
|---|---|---|---|---|---|---|---|---|---|
| Loss | 0–1 | Sam Alvey | Karate Combat 54 | KO (punches) | May 2, 2025 | 2 | 1:43 | Dubai, United Arab Emirates | For the Karate Combat Heavyweight Championship. |

== See also ==
- List of K-1 events
- List of It's Showtime champions
- List of male kickboxers
