= Thomas Alizier =

French Muay Thai kickboxer

- Born: Thomas Joris Paul Alizier; June 20, 1990 (age 36); Paris, France
- Other names: Drago
- Nationality: French
- Height: 1.91 m (6 ft 3 in)
- Weight: 94.5 kg (208 lb; 14.88 st)
- Division: Cruiserweight; Heavyweight
- Style: Kickboxing, Muay Thai
- Fighting out of: Boussy-Saint-Antoine, France
- Team: BMT91

Kickboxing record
- Total: 44
- Wins: 34
- By knockout: 13
- Losses: 9
- Draws: 1

Other information
- Occupation: architect
- Last updated on: May 24, 2015

Thomas Joris Paul Alizier (born June 20, 1990) is a French Muay Thai kickboxer who competes in the cruiserweight and heavyweight divisions. Having begun practicing Muay Thai, Alizier first came to prominence due to a successful career by winning one European and two world championships as well as taking other medals. He turned professional, and signed with SUPERKOMBAT Fighting Championship in 2015 after becoming the ISKA European Heavyweight Champion under K-1 rules. He previously competed in Enfusion.

== Titles ==
=== Amateur ===
- International Federation of Muaythai Amateur
  - 2009 IFMA World Championships -86 kg/189 lb silver medalist (silver)
- World Muaythai Federation
  - 2010 WMF World Championships -86 kg/189 lb gold medalist (gold)
  - 2011 WMF European Championships -86 kg/189 lb gold medalist (gold)
  - 2013 WMF World Championships -86 kg/189 lb silver medalist (silver)
- World Combat Games
  - 2013 World Combat Games -91 kg/200 lb Muay Thai bronze medalist (bronze)

=== Professional ===
- World Muaythai Federation
  - 2014 WMF World Cruiserweight (-91 kg/200 lb) Championships
- International Sport Karate Association
  - 2014 ISKA European Heavyweight (-95.0 kg/209 lb) K-1 Championship

== Kickboxing record ==
Professional kickboxing record
34 wins (13 (T)KOs), 9 losses, 1 draw
Date	Result	Opponent	Event	Location	Method	Round	Time
2019-06-13	Win	(France) Cédric Menereuilt	Triumph Fighting Tour	Paris, France	KO	3	
2015-06-19	Loss	(Belgium) Yassine Boughanem	Best of Siam 6	Paris, France	Decision (unanimous)	5	3:00
2015-04-03	Loss	(Romania) Andrei Stoica	SUPERKOMBAT World Grand Prix II 2015, Super Fight	Bucharest, Romania	TKO (referee stoppage)	2	2:39
2014-12-13	Win	(Slovakia) Miroslav Štverák	VICTORY 2	Paris, France	Decision (unanimous)	3	3:00
2014-07-12	Win	(Spain) Rúben Barnabé	Enfusion Live #20	Palma de Mallorca, Spain	TKO (retirement)	2	3:00
2014-05-24	Win	(Slovenia) Jasmin Bečirovič	Gorizia Fight Night II	Gorizia, Italy	Decision (unanimous)	5	3:00
Wins the ISKA European Heavyweight (-95.0 kg/209 lb) Championship.
2014-03-21	Win	(Ukraine) Bogdan Moroz	WMF World Championship	Pattaya, Thailand	KO	3	
Wins the WMF World Cruiserweight (-91.0 kg/209 lb) Championship.
2013-12-20	Loss	(Czech Republic) Petr Ondruš	Souboj Titanu, Tournament Final	Plzeň, Czech Republic	Decision (unanimous)	3	3:00
2013-12-20	Win	(Czech Republic) Petr Kares	Souboj Titanu, Tournament Semifinal	Plzeň, Czech Republic	Decision (unanimous)	3	3:00
2013-02-10	Win	(France) Arthur Kouame	Championnat De France	Paris, France	TKO (doctor stoppage)	4	
2011-12-10	Loss	(France) Samih Bachar	Eliminatoires IDF	Paris, France	Decision (unanimous)	5	3:00
Legend: Win Loss Draw/no contest Notes

Amateur kickboxing record
Date	Result	Opponent	Event	Location	Method	Round	Time
2013-10-21	Loss	(Russia) Artem Vakhitov	2013 World Combat Games -91 kg/200 lb Muay Thai, Semifinals	Saint Petersburg, Russia	TKO (corner stoppage)	1	
Wins the 2013 World Combat Games -91 kg Bronze Medal.
2013-10-19	Win	(Denmark) Frederic Langwgen	2013 World Combat Games -91 kg/200 lb Muay Thai, Quarterfinals	Saint Petersburg, Russia	Decision	3	2:00
2013-03-24	Loss	(Russia) Vladislav Pomob	2013 WMF World Championships, Tournament Final	Bangkok, Thailand	Decision (unanimous)	3	2:00
Wins the 2013 WMF World Championships -86 kg Silver Medal.
2013-03-23	Win	(Israel) Daniel Romy	2013 WMF World Championships, Tournament Semifinal	Bangkok, Thailand	Decision (unanimous)	3	2:00
2010-03-22	Win	(Ukraine) Borulko Dmytro	2010 WMF World Championships, Tournament Final	Bangkok, Thailand	Decision (unanimous)	3	2:00
Wins the 2010 WMF World Championships -86 kg Gold Medal.
2009-03	Loss	(Sweden) Adam Lazarević	2009 IFMA World Championships, Tournament Final	Bangkok, Thailand	Decision (unanimous)	3	2:00
Wins the 2009 IFMA World Championships -86 kg Silver Medal.
2009-03	Win	(India) Hemant Kumar	2009 IFMA World Championships, Tournament Semifinal	Bangkok, Thailand	KO (knee)	1	
2009-03	Win	(Bahrain) Mohamed Said	2009 IFMA World Championships, Tournament Quarterfinal	Bangkok, Thailand	KO (right straight)	3	
2009-03	Win	(Italy) Berkotti	2009 IFMA World Championships, Tournament Opening Round	Bangkok, Thailand	Decision (unanimous)	3	2:00
Legend: Win Loss Draw/no contest Notes

== See also ==
- List of male kickboxers
