= İbrahim Giydirir =

Turkish Muay Thai kickboxer (born 1989)

- Born: İbrahim Giydirir; July 25, 1989 (age 37); Istanbul, Turkey
- Nationality: Turkish
- Height: 1.93 m (6 ft 4 in)
- Weight: 90.5 kg (200 lb; 14.25 st)
- Division: Cruiserweight; Heavyweight
- Style: Kickboxing, Muay Thai
- Fighting out of: Istanbul, Turkey
- Team: Samurai Olimpik

Kickboxing record
- Total: 22
- Wins: 19
- By knockout: 7
- Losses: 3
- Draws: 0

Other information
- Occupation: personal trainer
- Last updated on: May 23, 2015

İbrahim Giydirir (born July 25, 1989) is a Turkish Muay Thai kickboxer who competes in the cruiserweight division. Having begun practicing Muay Thai, Giydirir first came to prominence due to a successful amateur career by winning one European as well as taking another medal - a bronze - at the next year IMFA European Championships which he ended after Dzianis Hancharonak and Vladimir Mineev respectively. He also took the bronze at the World Combat Games in 2013. Giydirir signed with SUPERKOMBAT Fighting Championship in 2015 after turning professional and knocking Mike Passenier's student, Fabian Gondorf, out in K-1.

== Career ==
He challenged Artem Vakhitov in a fight for the vacant Battle of Champions (-95 kg/209 lb) Championship at Battle of Champions 7 in Moscow, Russia on November 21, 2014, losing a unanimous decision after five rounds.

== Championships and awards ==
=== Kickboxing ===
- International Federation of Muaythai Amateur
  - 2012 IFMA European Muaythai Championships & European Cup gold medalist (gold)
  - 2013 IFMA European Muaythai Championships -91 kg/200 bronze medalist (bronze)
- World Combat Games
  - 2013 World Combat Games -91 kg/200 lb Muay Thai bronze medalist (bronze)

== Kickboxing record ==
Professional kickboxing record
19 wins (7 KOs), 3 losses, 0 draws
Date	Result	Opponent	Event	Location	Method	Round	Time
2017-10-21	Loss	(Azerbaijan) Bahram Rajabzadeh	Orion Fight Arenadan	Ankara, Turkey	TKO (low kicks)	1	
2017-07-22	Loss	(Netherlands) Bas Vosternbosch	Alkayiş Fight Arena 5	Mersin, Turkey	Decision (unanimous)	3	3:00
2017-05-13	Win	(Bosnia and Herzegovina) Adis Dadovic	Akin Dövüş Arenasi Gebze	Gebze, Turkey	KO (head kick)	1	0:39
2015-05-23	Loss	(Romania) Bogdan Stoica	SUPERKOMBAT World Grand Prix II 2015, Super Fight	Bucharest, Romania	Decision (unanimous)	3	3:00
2015-03-07	Win	(Romania) Cosmin Ionescu	SUPERKOMBAT World Grand Prix I 2015, Super Fight	Ploiești, Romania	Decision (unanimous)	3	3:00
2014-11-21	Loss	(Russia) Artem Vakhitov	Battle of Champions 7	Moscow, Russia	Decision (unanimous)	5	3:00
For vacant Battle of Champions (-95.5 kg/210 lb) Championship.
2014-02-23	Win	(Netherlands) Fabian Gondorf	K-1 World MAX 2013 World Championship Tournament Final 4, Super Fight	Baku, Azerbaijan	KO (left knee)	3	1:45
Legend: Win Loss Draw/no contest Notes

== See also ==
- List of male kickboxers
