= Said El Badaoui =

Martial arts trainer

- Born: Nador, Morocco
- Nationality: Moroccan and Dutch
- Style: Kickboxing, Muay Thai, Dutch kickboxing,
- Years active: 2004–present

Other information
- Occupation: Trainer
- Notable students: Badr Hari, Melvin Manhoef, Donegi Abena, Mohamed Mezouari, Ilias Bulaid, Ilias Ennahachi, Tayfun Özcan, Serkan Ozcaglayan, Germaine de Randamie, Ottman Azaitar, Nordine Mahieddine, Jahfarr Wilnis

Said El Badaoui is a Moroccan-Dutch Kickboxing and mixed martial arts coach who owns SB Gym in Utrecht, Netherlands. He is best known for training multiple MMA world champions. El Badaoui has trained numerous world class fighters including Badr Hari, Melvin Manhoef, Donegi Abena, Hamicha, Ilias Bulaid, Ilias Ennahachi, Tayfun Özcan, Serkan Ozcaglayan, Germaine de Randamie, Ottman Azaitar, Nordine Mahieddine and Jahfarr Wilnis, among many others. In 2021, he was nominated for Best Sportcoach prize in Utrecht.

On January 14, 2022, his student Murat Aygün was scheduled to fight Roman Kryklia at ONE Championship: Heavy Hitters. The fight was later cancelled, as El Badaoui and Aygün tested positive for COVID-19. They were quarantined for 14 days in a hotel in Singapore.

El Badaoui started his kickboxing career at the age of 14 and three years later, he made his debut as a professional. He retired from kickboxing after a severe motorcycle accident in 2001. He began his career as a coach in 2004.
