= Andrei Stoica =

Romanian kickboxer & wushu practitioner (born 1987)

- Born: Andrei Stoica; May 1, 1987 (age 39); Bucharest, Romania
- Other names: Mister KO
- Nationality: Romanian
- Height: 1.88 m (6 ft 2 in)
- Weight: 100.6 kg (222 lb; 15.84 st)
- Division: Heavyweight; Cruiserweight
- Reach: 74.0 in (188 cm)
- Style: Wushu, Kickboxing
- Fighting out of: Bucharest, Romania
- Team: Stoica Brothers Fight Academy; Respect Gym (formerly)
- Trainer: Andrei Ochi Mircea; Alin Panaite (formerly)

Kickboxing record
- Total: 71
- Wins: 55
- By knockout: 31
- Losses: 14
- By knockout: 5
- Draws: 0
- No contests: 2

Other information
- Spouse: Andra Stoica
- Notable relatives: Bogdan Stoica, brother
- Mixed martial arts record from Sherdog

Instagram information
- Page: andrei1stoica
- Years active: 2013 – present
- Followers: 204 thousand (January 19, 2024)
- Last updated on: October 21, 2023

Andrei Stoica
Medal record

Representing Romania

Wushu

European Championships
Gold medal – first place	2008 Warsaw	Sanshou -85 kg

National Championship
Gold medal – first place	2009 București	Sanshou -80 kg

National Championship
Gold medal – first place	2009 București	Qingda -85 kg

National Championship
Gold medal – first place	2008 București	Sanshou -80 kg

Andrei Cătălin Stoica (born May 1, 1987) is a Romanian kickboxer competing in the Light Heavyweight division. He was the first to hold the SUPERKOMBAT Super Cruiserweight Championship and held the SUPERKOMBAT record for most consecutive title defenses.

Stoica was the No. 5 ranked light-heavyweight in the world during his reign as the SUPERKOMBAT Super Cruiserweight Champion. He is also a three-time wushu national champion and European wushu champion.

While perhaps best known for competing in the Superkombat Fighting Championship (SUPERKOMBAT), he has also competed for K-1, Glory, LEGEND, Dynamite Fighting Show and ONE Championship, where he is a former ONE Light Heavyweight Championship title challenger

As of 1 January 2023, Stoica is ranked the #10 heavyweight in the world by Beyond Kick.

== Background ==
The son of a former boxer, Stoica started training judo at age 11 before switching to wushu and kickboxing at age 17 (he trained under Cătălin Zmărăndescu at CSA Steaua București).

He has been training in Bucharest, Romania for his entire career. Stoica first went to Respect Gym, which was run by Alin Panaite, where he trained with fellow kickboxers Bogdan Stoica, Benjamin Adegbuyi, Claudiu Bădoi, Ciprian Șchiopu and Florin Lupu.

In 2018, he opened his own gym (Stoica Brothers Fight Academy), and since then he has been training there also under the guidance of the boxing coach Andrei Mircea.

== Kickboxing career ==
=== SUPERKOMBAT Fighting Championship ===
In November 2010, the SUPERKOMBAT announced that they had signed Andrei Stoica and his younger brother Bogdan to compete in the promotion. Its chairman, Eduard Irimia, felt that the Respect Gym brothers have the potential to become top-class fighters.

On February 25, Stoica faced Redouan Cairo in a rematch at the SUPERKOMBAT World Grand Prix I 2012 in Podgorica, Montenegro. Originally, it was announced that Stoica defeated Cairo via decision after three rounds. However, SK officials overturned the decision to a no contest as the judges actually scored the bout a majority draw. Stoica had also caused controversy by inadvertently referring to Cairo as "the nigger" in his post-fight interview. Stoica himself apologized for the mistake, blaming his poor command of English (Stoica said he meant to use the term "negro" instead, which caused further controversy).

He next faced Toni Milanović at the SUPERKOMBAT World Grand Prix IV 2012 on October 20 in Arad, Romania and defeated the Croatian via split decision.

Stoica was scheduled to face Zabit Samedov for the inaugural SUPERKOMBAT Super Cruiserweight Championship at the SUPERKOMBAT World Grand Prix 2012 Final in Bucharest, Romania on December 22. However, Samedov took ill in the build-up to the fight and replaced by the lower-ranked Arnold Oborotov and so the bout was changed to a title eliminator with the winner facing Samedov. Stoica produced another emotionally-charged performance and knocked Oborotov out in the first round.

=== K-1 ===
He lost to Agron Preteni via unanimous decision in a non-tournament bout at the K-1 World Grand Prix FINAL in Zagreb, Croatia on March 15, 2013. The fight was all Stoica, until Preteni dropped him with a left hook early in the second round which earned an eight count and really turned the tide of the fight. Mladen Krajnčec, one of the judges said that this was hardest fight to judge and that K-1 rules clearly state that the one who is in a knockdown loses the fight.

He scored a second-round knockout of Zinedine Hameur-Lain at SUPERKOMBAT New Heroes 5 in Târgoviște, Romania on August 30, 2013.

He KOed Dženan Poturak in round two at SUPERKOMBAT World Grand Prix III 2013 in Botoșani, Romania on September 28.

=== LEGEND ===
He rematched Agron Preteni at Legend 2: Invasion in Moscow, Russia on November 9, 2013, in a reserve bout of Legend Fighting Show -95 kg tournament. Preteni took majority judges decision in a close fight with many strong kicks and punches which effected little damage.

=== SUPERKOMBAT Super Cruiserweight Champion ===
He defeated Ondřej Hutník by unanimous decision to win the vacant SUPERKOMBAT Super Cruiserweight Championship at the SUPERKOMBAT World Grand Prix 2013 Final in Galați, Romania on December 21.

=== GLORY ===
Stoica was knocked out by Danyo Ilunga in the tournament reserve bout at GLORY 15 - Light Heavyweight World Championship Tournament in Istanbul, Turkey on April 12, 2014. The two had spirited exchanges in the first round. Ilunga was consistent with his piercing knees to Stoica, who countered them well with his right hand. Both men were successful and landed hard shots before Stoica thought that he had an advantage on a particular combination but just grazed Ilunga with a hook instead of landing clean. This allowed Ilunga to get underneath it and come back with a huge counter right hand that floored and took Stoica out, who didn't have his feet beneath him to answer the ten count. Prior to the fight, he and Benjamin Adegbuyi spent time as sparring partners of Alexander Gustafsson at the Allstars Training Center in Stockholm, Sweden.

He was expected to make the first defence of his SUPERKOMBAT Super Cruiserweight Championship against Boy Boy Martin at SUPERKOMBAT World Grand Prix III 2014 in Constanța, Romania on June 21, 2014. Martin withdrew for undisclosed reasons, however, and was replaced by Ali Cenik. Stoica defeated Cenik via unanimous decision to retain the title.

He was scheduled to face Artem Vakhitov in a superfight at the Glory 20: Dubai on 3 April 2015 but pulled out for unknown reasons.

Stoica had his second title defense against Moises Baute on October 25, 2014, at SUPERKOMBAT World Grand Prix 2014 Final Elimination, where he won via KO in the third round. The win also earned him 2014 Fight of the Year and 2014 Knockout of The Year awards.

Stoica next faced Emilio Vallecillo on November 22, 2014, at SUPERKOMBAT World Grand Prix 2014 Final, Stoica won via TKO in the first round.

Stoica faced Marcello Adriaansz on March 7, 2015, at SUPERKOMBAT World Grand Prix I 2015 and won via unanimous decision.

Stoica fought Thomas Alizier on May 23, 2015, in his hometown, at SUPERKOMBAT World Grand Prix II 2015, winning the bout by knockout the second round.

Stoica faced Abdarhmane Coulibaly on July 19, 2015, at SUPERKOMBAT World Grand Prix III 2015 in another non-title bout. Stoica won via unanimous decision.

On August 1, 2015, at SUPERKOMBAT World Grand Prix IV 2015 Stoica defended his title by defeating Fred Sikking by first-round KO. He scored with a left that ended the bout in one minute and fifteen seconds. After the win Stoica stated "I told you before. This belt it's mine. Sikking came out aggressive, he threw some shots, but he had no chance."

A superfight against Pavel Voronin took place for October 2, 2015, at SUPERKOMBAT World Grand Prix 2015 Final Elimination. In the first round Stoica looked to work the head and body with punches while mixing in the occasional kick, Voronin looked to attack Stoica's lead leg with kicks. Stoica took over in the second round as his boxing was too fast and accurate for Voronin. In the third round Stoica connected with a knee to the body that forced Voronin to take a knee. He recovered to make it to the end of the bout, but Stoica took home a clear unanimous decision winning his eight consecutive fight.

Stoica is expected to defend his title against Jorge Loren at SUPERKOMBAT World Grand Prix 2015 Final. Loren won the fight by TKO, after knocking Stoica down three times during the course of the first round.

=== Post SUPERKOMBAT ===
Stoica was scheduled to fight Mladen Kujundžić at Respect World Series 1, his first fight outside of SUPERKOMBAT in nearly two years. Kujundžić won the fight by a first-round TKO. Stoica managed to halt the two fight losing skid with a first round low kick knockout of Antonio Souza.

Following these two fights, Stoica was scheduled to fight Tomáš Hron at W5 Grand Prix “Legends in Prague” for the vacant W5 Intercontinental Super Heavyweight Championship. Hron won the fight by unanimous decision.

After losing to Hron, Stoica went on a four fight winning streak, defeating Pavel Voronin, George Davis, Ivan Bartek and Sahak Parparyan, before losing a decision to Donegi Abena. He rebounded with a unanimous decision victory against Tomas Steponkevicius.

In September 2018, Stoica took part in the WFL Heavyweight tournament. Stoica won a decision against Levi Kuyken in the quarterfinals, but lost a decision in turn to Nordine Mahieddine in the semifinals.

Going back to his native Romania, Stoica fought twice under the banner of Dynamite Fighting Show, defeating Sazan Memedi by decision and Luis Morais by a first-round knockout.

As of 7 November 2018, Stoica was ranked the #7 light-heavyweight in the world by Enfusion Live.

=== ONE Championship ===
On March 9, 2019, Andrei Stoica made his ONE debut against former SUPERKOMBAT World Grand Prix Champion Tarik Khbabez at ONE Championship: Reign of Valor. However, he was overpowered by the Dutch-Moroccan during the fight. Stoica went on to lose by unanimous decision.

Stoica made his return on April 12, 2019, at ONE Championship: Roots of Honor, facing Ibrahim El Bouni. He went on to win by unanimous decision.

On December 6, 2019, Andrei Stoica next faced Anderson Silva at ONE Championship: Mark Of Greatness in a match that had world title implications. Stoica quickly finished Silva, knocking the Brazilian out at 1:58 of the first round. After the fight, Stoica expressed interest in challenging Roman Kryklia for the ONE Kickboxing Light Heavyweight World Championship. The two have been scheduled to fight for the title at ONE Infinity 1. The event was later postponed, due to the COVID-19 pandemic.

Stoica was scheduled to fight a trilogy match with Pavel Voronin during DFS 9. He won the fight by split decision. The fans' opinions were divided resulting in a controversy. Dynamite Fighting Show booked an immediate rematch in 2021.

==== Title shot ====
Stoica was scheduled to fight the reigning ONE Kickboxing Light Heavyweight champion Roman Kryklia at ONE Championship: Collision Course. This bout was previously postponed three times in 2020 due to the COVID-19 pandemic.

Kryklia and the designated mandatory challenger Stoica were supposed to meet in 2021, but in December 2020 the Ukrainian did not face Murat Aygün. Stoica was already on holiday and agreed to take a title match on short notice in just 2 weeks since he was announced. At the official weigh in, Kryklia weighed more.

Eventually, the fight was won by Kryklia by unanimous decision, who was in control during the match. The general opinion was that Stoica was not prepared and fresh for this fight.

==== Comeback ====
Stoica returned to ONE at ONE 156, facing Giannis Stoforidis on April 22, 2022. He went on to win the fight by split decision.

Stoica faced Françesco Xhaja on February 25, 2023, at ONE Fight Night 7. He lost the fight via split decision.

== Championships and accomplishments ==
=== Kickboxing ===
- Dynamite Fighting Show
  - 2021 Knockout of the Year vs. Pavel Voronin
  - 2021 Most Popular Fighter of the Year
- SUPERKOMBAT Fighting Championship
  - SUPERKOMBAT Super Cruiserweight Championship -95 kg/209 lb (First)
  - 2014 Fighter of the Year
  - 2014 Fight of the Year (vs. Moisés Baute)
  - 2014 Knockout of The Year (vs. Moisés Baute)
  - First SUPERKOMBAT Super Cruiserweight Champion
  - Most successful title defenses in SUPERKOMBAT Super Cruiserweight history
  - Most consecutive title defenses In SUPERKOMBAT Super Cruiserweight history
  - Most finishes in SUPERKOMBAT title fights
- Romania Sports Journalists' Club (CSJ)
  - 2014 Fighter of the Year

=== Wushu ===
- Romanian National Championships
  - Gold (2008, 2009, 2009)
- European Championships
  - European Champion (one time)

== Kickboxing record ==
Kickboxing Record
55 Wins (31 (T)KO's), 14 Losses, 2 NC
Date	Result	Opponent	Event	Location	Method	Round	Time
2026-06-19	NC	(France) Zinedine Hameur-Lain	Dynamite Fighting Show 31	Târgu Jiu, Romania	kick to a downed opponent	1	2:32
2023-10-21	Win	(Italy) Dragoș Zubco	MO Fighting Show 1	Turin, Italy	TKO (retirement)	3	3:00
2023-02-24	Loss	(Italy) Françesco Xhaja	ONE Fight Night 7	Bangkok, Thailand	Decision (Split)	3	3:00
2022-04-22	Win	(Greece) Giannis Stoforidis	ONE 156	Kallang, Singapore	Decision (Majority)	3	3:00
2021-06-04	Win	(Moldova) Pavel Voronin	Dynamite Fighting Show 11	Bucharest, Romania	KO (Body Knee)	1	2:07
2020-12-18	Loss	(Ukraine) Roman Kryklia	ONE Championship: Collision Course	Kallang, Singapore	Decision (Unanimous)	5	3:00
For the ONE Kickboxing Light Heavyweight Championship.
2020-12-04	Win	(Moldova) Pavel Voronin	Dynamite Fighting Show 9	Cluj Napoca, Romania	Decision (Split)	3	3:00
2019-12-06	Win	(Brazil) Anderson Silva	ONE Championship: Mark Of Greatness	Kuala Lumpur, Malaysia	KO (Right Cross)	1	1:57
2019-04-12	Win	(Morocco) Ibrahim El Bouni	ONE Championship: Roots of Honor	Manila, Philippines	Decision (Unanimous)	3	3:00
2019-03-09	Loss	(Morocco) Tarik Khbabez	ONE Championship: Reign of Valor	Yangon, Myanmar	Decision (Unanimous)	3	3:00
2018-12-15	Win	(Portugal) Luis Morais	Dynamite Fighting Show 3	Craiova, Romania	KO (Left Uppercut and Left Hook)	1	0:58
2018-10-19	Win	(Switzerland) Sazan Memedi	Dynamite Fighting Show 2	Piatra Neamț, Romania	Decision (Unanimous)	3	3:00
2018-09-22	Loss	(Algeria) Nordine Mahieddine	WFL: Final, Semi Finals	Almere, Netherlands	Decision (Split)	3	3:00
2018-09-22	Win	(Belgium) Levi Kuyken	WFL: Final 8, Quarter Finals	Almere, Netherlands	Decision (Unanimous)	3	3:00
2018-08-24	Win	(Lithuania) Tomas Steponkevicius	OSS Fighters 02/GFC 4	Mamaia, Romania	Decision (Unanimous)	3	3:00
2018-07-13	Loss	(Suriname) Donegi Abena	ACB KB 16	Târgoviște, Romania	Decision (Split)	3	3:00
2017-10-29	Win	(Armenia) Sahak Parparyan	WFL: Manhoef vs. Bonjasky, Final 16	Almere, Netherlands	Decision (Unanimous)	3	3:00
2017-06-17	Win	(Slovakia) Ivan Bartek	Colosseum Tournament 2	Ploiești, Romania	Decision (Unanimous)	3	3:00
2017-03-25	Win	(United Kingdom) George Davis	AYO 1	Baia Mare, Romania	TKO (referee stoppage)	1	2:16
2017-01-21	Win	(Moldova) Pavel Voronin	La Nuit des Gladiateurs 2017	Marseille, France	Decision (Unanimous)	3	3:00
2016-10-08	Loss	(Czech Republic) Tomáš Hron	W5 Grand Prix “Legends in Prague”	Prague, Czech Republic	Decision (Unanimous)	3	3:00
For the vacant W5 Intercontinental Super Heavyweight Championship.
2016-07-02	Win	(Portugal) Antonio Souza	Respect World Series 2	London, England	KO (Low Kick)	1	2:20
2016-03-19	Loss	(Croatia) Mladen Kujundžić	Respect World Series 1	Madrid, Spain	TKO (Corner Stoppage)	1	1:23
2015-11-07	Loss	(Spain) Jorge Loren	SUPERKOMBAT World Grand Prix 2015 Final	Bucharest, Romania	TKO (Referee Stoppage)	1	2:21
Lost the SUPERKOMBAT Super Cruiserweight Championship & for the WKN Diamond Super Cruiserweight Title.
2015-10-02	Win	(Moldova) Pavel Voronin	SUPERKOMBAT World Grand Prix 2015 Final Elimination	Milan, Italy	Decision (Unanimous)	3	3:00
2015-08-01	Win	(Netherlands) Fred Sikking	SUPERKOMBAT World Grand Prix IV 2015	Mamaia, Romania	KO (Left Hook)	1	1:35
Defended the SUPERKOMBAT Super Cruiserweight Championship.
2015-06-19	Win	(France) Abdarhmane Coulibaly	SUPERKOMBAT World Grand Prix III 2015	Constanța, Romania	Decision (Unanimous)	3	3:00
2015-05-23	Win	(France) Thomas Alizier	SUPERKOMBAT World Grand Prix II 2015	Bucharest, Romania	TKO (Referee Stoppage)	2	2:39
2015-03-07	Win	(Netherlands) Marcello Adriaansz	SUPERKOMBAT World Grand Prix I 2015	Ploiești, Romania	Decision (Unanimous)	3	3:00
2014-11-22	Win	(United States) Emilio Vallecillo	SUPERKOMBAT World Grand Prix 2014 Final	Monza, Italy	TKO (Referee Stoppage)	1	2:50
2014-10-25	Win	(Spain) Moisés Baute	SUPERKOMBAT World Grand Prix 2014 Final Elimination	Geneva, Switzerland	KO (Left Hook)	3	2:30
Defended the SUPERKOMBAT Super Cruiserweight Championship.
2014-06-21	Win	(Turkey) Ali Cenik	SUPERKOMBAT World Grand Prix III 2014	Constanța, Romania	Decision (Unanimous)	3	3:00
Defended the SUPERKOMBAT Super Cruiserweight Championship.
2014-04-12	Loss	(Germany) Danyo Ilunga	Glory 15: Istanbul	Istanbul, Turkey	KO (Right Overhand)	1	2:33
Light Heavyweight World Championship Tournament, Reserve Match.
2013-12-21	Win	(Czech Republic) Ondřej Hutník	SUPERKOMBAT World Grand Prix 2013 Final	Galați, Romania	Decision (Unanimous)	3	3:00
Won the vacant SUPERKOMBAT Super Cruiserweight Championship.
2013-11-08	Loss	(Croatia) Agron Preteni	Legend 2: Invasion	Moscow, Russia	Decision (Majority)	3	3:00
2013-09-28	Win	(Bosnia and Herzegovina) Dženan Poturak	SUPERKOMBAT World Grand Prix III 2013	Botoșani, Romania	KO (Left Hook)	2	0:52
2013-08-30	Win	(France) Zinedine Hameur-Lain	SUPERKOMBAT New Heroes 5	Târgoviște, Romania	KO (Right Cross)	2	2:35
2013-03-15	Loss	(Croatia) Agron Preteni	K-1 World Grand Prix FINAL in Zagreb	Zagreb, Croatia	Decision (Unanimous)	3	3:00
2012-12-22	Win	(United Kingdom) Arnold Oborotov	SUPERKOMBAT World Grand Prix 2012 Final	Bucharest, Romania	KO (Left Hook)	1	1:42
SUPERKOMBAT Super Cruiserweight Title Eliminator.
2012-10-20	Win	(Croatia) Toni Milanović	SUPERKOMBAT World Grand Prix IV 2012	Arad, Romania	Decision (Split)	3	3:00
2012-07-07	Win	(Netherlands) Hakan Aksoy	SUPERKOMBAT World Grand Prix III 2012	Varna, Bulgaria	TKO (Three Knockdowns)	1	1:20
2012-05-12	Win	(Netherlands) Rodney Glunder	SUPERKOMBAT World Grand Prix II 2012	Cluj Napoca, Romania	Decision (Unanimous)	3	3:00
2012-02-25	NC	(Netherlands) Redouan Cairo	SUPERKOMBAT World Grand Prix I 2012	Podgorica, Montenegro	No Contest	3	3:00
Originally, it was announced that Stoica defeated Cairo via decision. However, SUPERKOMBAT officials overturned the decision to a no contest as the judges actually scored the bout a majority draw.
2011-11-19	Win	(Germany) James Phillips	SUPERKOMBAT World Grand Prix 2011 Final	Darmstadt, Germany	KO (Right High Kick)	1	2:19
2011-09-16	Loss	(Serbia) Jovan Kaluđerovic	Wako-Pro World Grand Prix 2011: Romania vs Serbia	Bucharest, Romania	KO (Left Hook)	1	2:59
2011-07-16	Win	(Netherlands) Henriques Zowa	SUPERKOMBAT World Grand Prix II 2011	Constanța, Romania	Decision (Unanimous)	3	3:00
2011-04-30	Loss	(Netherlands) Redouan Cairo	K-1 Rules Kickboxing in Monaco	Monte Carlo, Monaco	Decision (Split)	5	3:00
For the vacant WAKO-Pro K-1 rules -85 kg Intercontinental title.
2011-03-18	Win	(Italy) Alex Rossi	Wako-Pro World Grand Prix 2011: Romania vs Italy	Râmnicu Vâlcea, Romania	Decision (Unanimous)	3	3:00
2010-11-20	Win	(Germany) Timur Hapolat	Local Kombat "10 ani in RING"	Sibiu, Romania	Decision (Unanimous)	3	3:00
2010-10-09	Win	(France) Massinissa Hamaili	TK2 2010	Aix-en-Provence, France	TKO (Doctor Stoppage)	2	2:40
2010-07-24	Win	(United Kingdom) Alex Foreman	Selecţia Local Kombat	Constanţa, Romania	KO	1	02:43
2010-07-16	Win	(Bulgaria) Georgi Bliznakov	Local Kombat "Bătălia Balcanilor"	Constanţa, Romania	TKO (Referee Stoppage)	1	0:37
2010-03-27	Loss	(Germany) James Phillips	K-1 ColliZion 2010 Croatia	Split, Croatia	Decision (Unanimous)	3	3:00
2009-09-21	Win	(Romania) Vadim Grâu	Kombat.ro 3	Ploiești, Romania	KO	1	1:44
Legend: Win Loss Draw/No contest Notes

== Mixed martial arts record ==
Professional record breakdown
1 match	0 wins	0 losses
By knockout	0	0
By submission	0	0
By decision	0	0
No contests	1	

Res.	Record	Opponent	Method	Event	Date	Round	Time	Location	Notes
NC	0–0 (1)	Ronald Garland	NC (kick to the groin)	Strike FC: Night of Gladiators	April 18, 2008	1	N/A	Ploiești, Romania	

== Personal life ==
He is married, and has two sons and a daughter (Albert b. 2013, Alexandru Constantin b. 2015 and Eva b. 2019). Andrei Stoica is an Orthodox Christian, often wearing a cross around his neck.

== See also ==
- List of male mixed martial artists
- List of male kickboxers
