= Nicolas Wamba =

French kickboxer (born 1988)

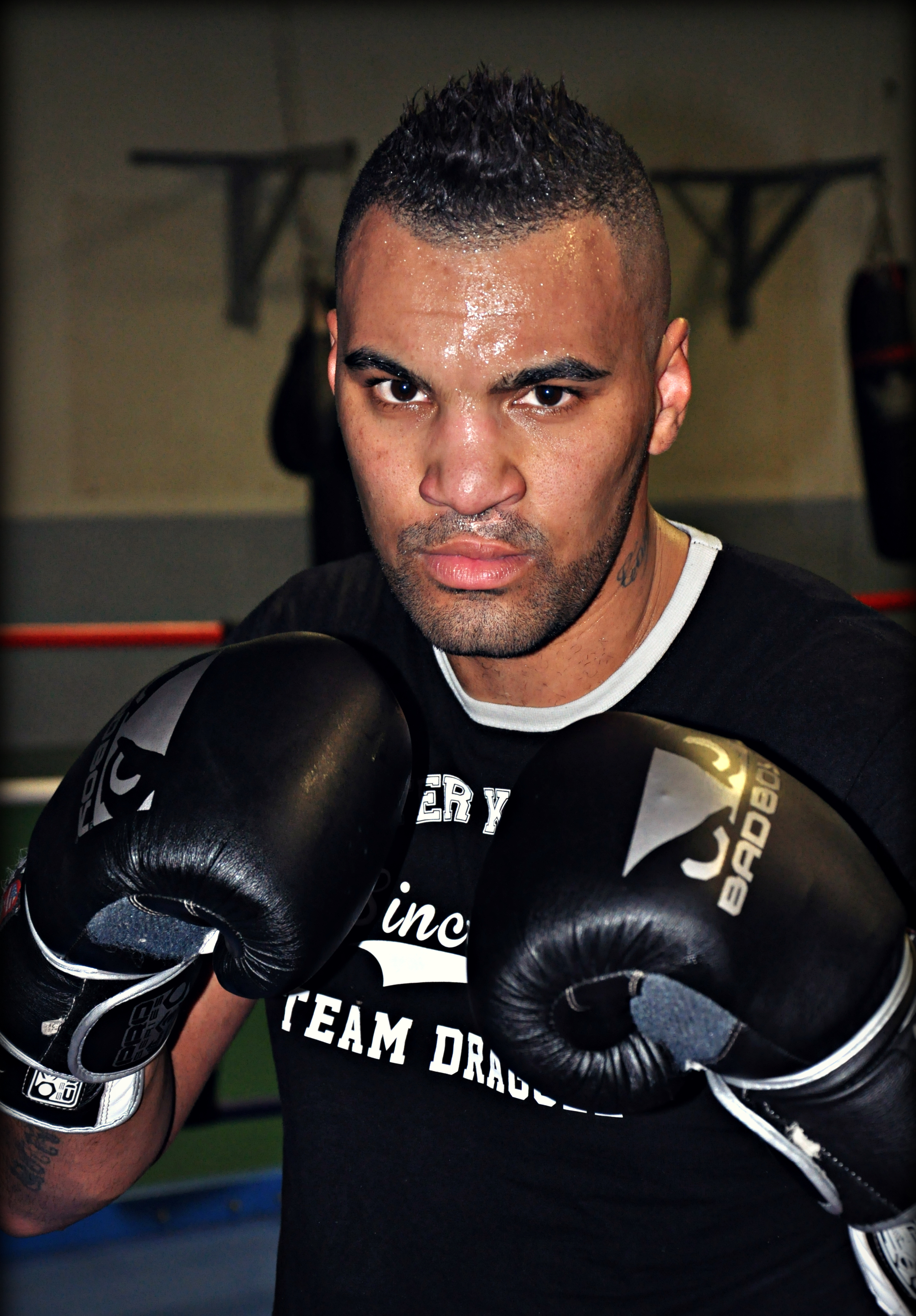
- Nicolas Wamba
- Born: Nicolas Wamba; February 12, 1988 (age 38); Saint-Brieuc, France
- Other names: Junior
- Nationality: French
- Height: 1.92 m (6 ft 3 1/2 in)
- Weight: 117.4 kg (259 lb; 18 st 7 lb)
- Division: Heavyweight
- Reach: 74.0 in (188 cm)
- Fighting out of: France
- Team: Team Dragole
- Trainer: Christophe Dragole

Professional boxing record
- Total: 8
- Wins: 8
- By knockout: 3
- Losses: 0

Kickboxing record
- Total: 54
- Wins: 43
- Losses: 11
- Last updated on: October 10, 2015

Nicolas Wamba-Barzic (born 12 February 1988), is a French heavyweight boxer and former kickboxer, former WKN World Super Heavyweight Kickboxing Champion. As of 2017, he was ranked the #17 heavyweight in the world by GLORY. He is the son of Anaclet Wamba

== Biography and career ==
On November 4, 2011 Wamba won Bigger's Better 8 tournament in Lisbon, Portugal.

On March 30, 2013 Wamba defeated Sergej Maslobojev by unanimous decision and won WKN European super heavyweight title.

Wamba became the first La Nuit des Champions Heavyweight (+100 kg/220 lb) K-1 Rules Champion at La 20ème Nuit des Champions event in Marseille, France on 23 November 2013, defeating Daniel Sam. He took unanimous decision win, Sam was docked one point in first round for grabbing Wamba's leg, and Wamba scored a knockdown in third round when landed a high kick.

He challenged Raoumaru for the vacant World Kickboxing Network Kickboxing Rules Super Heavyweight World Championship on 22 March 2014 in Agde, France at 11th Trophee de l’Ephebe event. Wamba won the title by TKO as the referee stopped the fight in round 2.

He was knocked out by Jamal Ben Saddik in round two at Glory 16: Denver in Broomfield, Colorado, US on April 3, 2014.

On August 4, 2013 in Saint Tropez, France, Wamba defeated Stefan Leko by knockout in the fourth round.

Wamba defeated Arnold Oborotov at Fight Night Saint-Tropez II in Saint-Tropez, France on August 4, 2014. Wamba earned a cut above right eye in first round, but defeated Oborotov via a spectacular right head-kick.

on June 10, 2017 in Paris, France, Wamba defeated Jhonata Diniz of Brazil by a unanimous decision at Glory 42 Paris.

In February 2018 Wamba temporarily retired due to health issues.

In April 19, 2019 he returned to the ring and made his pro boxing debut winning the bout against Aleksander Lepsveridze via second-round TKO.

Wamba takes part in the Glory 99 “Heavyweight Last Man Standing Tournament” where 32 heavyweight fighters compete on April 5, 2025 in Rotterdam, Netherlands.

== Titles and accomplishments ==
=== Kickboxing ===
- International Sport Kickboxing Association
  - 2023 ISKA K-1 World Super-heavyweight Champion
- World Kickboxing Network
  - 2023 WKN European Kickboxing Rules Super Heavyweight Champion
  - 2017 WKN Intercontinental Kickboxing Rules Super Heavyweight Champion
  - 2016 WKN European Kickboxing Rules Super Heavyweight Champion
  - 2015 WKN Intercontinental Oriental Rules Super Heavyweight Champion
  - 2014 WKN Kickboxing Super Heavyweight World Champion +96.600 kg
  - 2013 WKN Kickboxing Super Heavyweight European Champion
- La Nuit des Champions
  - 2013 NDC K-1 Rules Heavyweight +100 kg Champion
- FFKMDA
  - 2008 Full Contact France Champion +91 kg Elite classe A
- World Association of Kickboxing Organizations
  - 2024 W.A.K.O K-1 World Super Heavyweight (+94 kg) Champion
  - 2004 W.A.K.O. World Championship Full Contact junior champion

=== Boxing ===
  - 2021 French Heavyweight Champion 2021
- Hybrid Boxing / Kickboxing rules
  - 2012 Bigger's Better 10 in Moulineaux, France Tournament Semifinalist
  - 2011 Bigger's Better King in Varaždin, Croatia Tournament Semifinalist
  - 2011 Bigger's Better 8 in Lisbon, Portugal Tournament Champion

== Kickboxing record ==
Kickboxing Record
43 Wins, 11 Losses
Date	Result	Opponent	Event	Location	Method	Round	Time
2025-11-08	Loss	(Argentina) Pablo Molina	Kick's Night	Agde, France	Decision (Unanimous)	5	3:00
For the vacant WKN K-1 World Super Heavyweight title.
2025-04-05	Loss	(Guinea) Mory Kromah	Glory 99 - Last Heavyweight Standing, Opening Round	Rotterdam, Netherlands	TKO (injury)	2	1:37
2024-11-30	Win	(France) Mohamed Bensalem	Kick's Night 2024	Agde, France	Decision (Unanimous)	5	3:00
Wins the WAKO K-1 World Super Heavyweight (+94kg) title.
2024-03-30	Loss	(South Korea) Ho Jae Lee	Bonxing Supremacy 3	Alès, France	TKO (Doctor stop./leg injury)	5	
For the vacant WKN K-1 World Super Heavyweight title.
2023-12-09	Win	(Romania) Marius Munteanu	Kick's Night	Agde, France	Decision (Unanimous)	5	3:00
Wins the vacant ISKA K-1 World Super-heavyweight Championship.
2023-05-06	Win	(Greece) Michael Karamousketas	MMB Fight III	Millau, France	Decision	3	3:00
2023-04-08	Win	(Sweden) Faris Lukovic	Boxing Supremacy 2	Alès, France	Decision (Unanimous)	5	3:00
Wins WKN European K-1 +91kg Championship.
2022-11-19	Win	(Turkey) Mehmet Ozer	Kick's Night 2022	Agde, France	Decision (Unanimous)	3	3:00
2017-06-10	Win	(Brazil) Jhonata Diniz	Glory 42: Paris	Paris, France	Decision (unanimous)	3	3:00
2017-05-12	Win	(Poland) Kocjan Lukasz	TEKB 14	Cap d'Agde, France	KO	3	
Wins WKN Intercontinental Kickboxing Rules Super Heavyweight Championship.
2016-11-05	Win	(France) Nordine Mahieddine	Glory 35: Nice	Nice, France	Decision (Unanimous)	3	3:00
2016-06-11	Win	(Czech Republic) Michal Reissinger	13th Trophee de l’Ephebe	Cap d'Agde, France	Decision (Unanimous)	5	3:00
For the WKN European Kickboxing Rules Super Heavyweight Championship.
2016-04-16	Loss	(Czech Republic) Ondřej Hutník	Simply the Best 10 Prague	Prague, Czech Republic	KO (Punch)	3	
For the WKN Intercontinental Kickboxing Rules Super Heavyweight Championship.
2015-11-07	Loss	(Morocco) Tarik Khbabez	SUPERKOMBAT World Grand Prix 2015 Final, Semifinals	Bucharest, Romania	Decision (Unanimous)	3	3:00
2015-10-10	Win	(Turkey) Yuksel Ayaydin	World GBC Tour 9	Mazan, France	Decision	3	3:00
2015-05-23	Win	(Czech Republic) Petr Vondráček	Simply the Best 4	Usti nad Labem, Czech Republic	Decision	3	3:00
Wins the WKN Intercontinental Oriental Rules Super Heavyweight Championship.
2014-11-22	Loss	(Croatia) Mladen Brestovac	La 21ème Nuit des Champions	Marseille, France	TKO (Injury)	2	
Lost NDC K-1 rules heavyweight +100 kg title.
2014-08-04	Win	(Lithuania) Arnold Oborotov	Fight Night Saint-Tropez II	Saint-Tropez, France	KO (Right High Kick)	2	
2014-05-03	Loss	(Morocco) Jamal Ben Saddik	Glory 16: Denver	Broomfield, Colorado, USA	TKO (left hook)	2	1:24
2014-03-22	Win	(Japan) Raoumaru	11th Trophee de l’Ephebe	Agde, France	TKO (Referee Stop.)	2	
Wins WKN Kickboxing Super Heavyweight World Championship.
2013-11-23	Win	(England) Daniel Sam	La 20ème Nuit des Champions	Marseille, France	Decision (Unanimous)	3	3:00
Wins NDC K-1 rules heavyweight +100 kg title.
2013-10-11	Win	(France) Pacôme Assi	Warriors Night 2	France	Decision	3	3:00
2013-08-04	Win	(Germany) Stefan Leko	Fight Night	Saint Tropez, France	KO	4	2:00
2013-05-25	Win	(Slovenia) Enver Šljivar	10th Nuit des Sports de Combat	Geneva, Switzerland	Decision	3	3:00
2013-03-30	Win	(Lithuania) Sergej Maslobojev		Agde, France	Decision	5	2:00
Wins WKN Kickboxing Super Heavyweight European Championship.
2011-06-11	Win	(Spain) Frank Muñoz	8e Nuit des Sports de Combat	Geneva, Switzerland	Decision	5	2:00
2011-05-27	Loss	(France) Fabrice Aurieng	K-1 Kick Tournament in Marseille, Final	Marseille, France	Decision	3	3:00
For K-1 Kick Tournament in Marseille tournament title.
2011-05-27	Win	(Cameroon) David Assienne Boyomo	K-1 Kick Tournament in Marseille, Semifinals	Marseille, France	Decision	3	3:00
2011-03-19	Win	(France) Nordine Mahieddine	8e TEKB Vainqueur Trophée de l'Ephèbe	Le Cap d'Agde, France	TKO (Doctor Stop.)	4	2:00
2011-05-07	Loss	(France) Stéphane Susperregui	7e Nuit des Sports de Combat, Final	Geneva, Switzerland	TKO (doctor stoppage)	2	
For WKN kickboxing GP 2011 –100 kg title.
2011-05-07	Win	(Croatia) Vjekoslav Bajić	7e Nuit des Sports de Combat, Semifinals	Geneva, Switzerland	TKO (doctor stoppage)	2	
2010-03-13	Win	(France) Yan Thomas	7e TEKB Vainqueur Trophée de l'Ephèbe	Le Cap d'Agde, France	TKO	4	2:00
2010-01-29	Win	(France) Fabrice Aurieng	K-1 Kick Tournament in Marseille, Final	Marseille, France	Decision	3	3:00
Wins K-1 Kick Tournament in Marseille tournament title.
2010-01-29	Win	(France) Cyril Nicolas Ascencio	K-1 Kick Tournament in Marseille, Semifinals	Marseille, France	Decision	3	3:00
2009-01-29	Loss	(Portugal) Humberto Evora	Champions League, Final	Lisbon, Portugal	Decision (Split)	3	3:00
For Champions League Super Heavyweight Tournament title.
2009-01-29	Win	(Suriname) Ismael Londt	Champions League, Semifinals	Lisbon, Portugal	Decision (Split)	3	3:00
2008-10-30	Loss	(Ukraine) Pavel Zhuravlev	WBKF European Tournament (+93 kg) @ Club Arbat, semifinals	Moscow, Russia	Decision (Unanimous)	3	3:00
Legend: Win Loss Draw/No contest Notes

== Professional boxing record ==
9 fights	8 wins	1 loss
By knockout	3	0
By decision	5	1

No.	Result	Record	Opponent	Type	Round, time	Date	Location	Notes
9	Loss	8–1	Cyril Leonet	RTD	5 (10), 3:00	Apr 9, 2022	Salle des trois provinces, Brive, France	Lost French National heavyweight title
8	Win	8–0	Karim Berredjem	UD	10	Nov 13, 2021	Maison des Sports, Clermont-Ferrand, France	Retained French National heavyweight title
7	Win	7–0	David Spilmont	UD	10	Jun 25, 2021	Salle la Soucoupe, Saint-Nazaire, France	Won French National heavyweight title
6	Win	6–0	David Spilmont	TKO	6 (6)	Feb 14, 2020	Salle du Palais des Sports, Saint-Quentin, France	
5	Win	5–0	Aleksander Lepsveridze	TKO	2 (6)	Nov 2, 2019	Halle Clemenceau, Grenoble, France	
4	Win	4–0	Knife Didier	PTS	6	Sep 27, 2019	Sportica Arena, Gravelines, France	
3	Win	3–0	Abdarhmane Coulibaly	UD	4	Jun 28, 2019	Movfight Club, Puiseux-Pontoise, France	
2	Win	2–0	Miloslav Pavek	UD	6	Apr 27, 2019	Salle des Fêtes de l'Hôtel de Ville, Villerupt, France	
1	Win	1–0	Aleksander Lepsveridze	TKO	2 (4)	Apr 19, 2019	Palais des Sports, Agde, France	

== See also ==
- List of male kickboxers
