= Cihad Kepenek =

Turkish kickboxer (born 1993)

- Born: October 6, 1993 (age 33); Tokat, Turkey
- Other names: The Ottoman
- Height: 1.95 m (6 ft 5 in)
- Weight: 103.3 kg (228 lb; 16 st 4 lb)
- Division: Heavyweight
- Style: Kickboxing
- Stance: Orthodox
- Fighting out of: Istanbul, Turkey

Kickboxing record
- Total: 31
- Wins: 23
- By knockout: 16
- Losses: 8

Cihad Kepenek (born 1 October 1993) is a Turkish kickboxer, currently competing in the heavyweight division of kickboxing promotion Glory.

== Kickboxing career ==
Kepenek made his promotional debut with Glory against Tomáš Možný at Glory 29: Copenhagen on April 16, 2016. He lost the fight by unanimous decision, after an extra fourth round was contested.

Kepenek was booked to face Yurii Gorbenko at Prestige Fights 2 on September 30, 2016. He won the fight by unanimous decision.

Kepenek faced Junior Tafa at Glory 65: Utrecht on May 17, 2019. He won the fight by unanimous decision.

Kepenek faced Sergio Pique at World Fight Night on April 14, 2018. He lost the fight by unanimous decision.

Kepenek was scheduled to fight Nordine Mahieddine at Glory Collision 2 on December 21, 2019. He lost the fight by split decision, after an extra round was fought.

Kepenek challenged the reigning ISKA Muaythai World Super Heavyweight champion Thomas Froschauer at Army of Fighters 1 on July 10, 2021. He won the fight by a first-round knockout.

Kepenek was booked to rematch Nordine Mahieddine at Glory 81: Ben Saddik vs. Adegbuyi 2 on August 20, 2022. He initially won the fight via first-round knockout, but the result would later be changed to No Contest after Kepenek tested positive for a banned substance.

Kepenek faced Michal Blawdziewicz at Glory 90. He won via unanimous decision.

He faced Blawdziewicz in a rematch at the Glory Heavyweight Grand Prix, with a Reserve Slot in the night's tournament on the line. He won the fight via KO in round 2, but would not be called in to replace any fighters.

He faced Inout Iancu at Glory 96, losing via TKO in the second round after being knocked down 3 times in one round.

=== Glory Last Heavyweight Standing Tournament ===
Kepenek took part in the Glory 99 “Heavyweight Last Man Standing Tournament” where 32 heavyweight fighters competed on April 5, 2025 in Rotterdam, Netherlands. He faced Iancu in a rematch, losing via TKO in the first round, retiring between rounds 1 and 2.

He faced Sofian Laidouni in the Opening Round of Phase 2 of the tournament at Glory 103. He lost via unanimous decision, being eliminated from the tournament for a second time.

== Failed drug test ==
=== GLORY 81 ===
Kepenek faced Nordine Mahieddine at Glory 81, initially winning via KO. However, the result was overturned to a no contest on November 24, as Kepenek tested positive for a banned substance. He was also suspended for 12 months.

== Championships and accomplishments ==
- International Sport Kickboxing Association
  - 2021 ISKA Muaythai World Super Heavyweight Champion

== Kickboxing record ==
Kickboxing record
8 Wins (8 KOs), 9 Losses, 1 No Contest
Date	Result	Opponent	Event	Location	Method	Round	Time
2026-12-05		(France) Fares Bainine	SENSHI 34 - Heavyweight Grand Prix, Quarterfinals	Varna, Bulgaria			
2025-08-23	Loss	(France) Sofian Laidouni	Glory 103 - Last Heavyweight Standing Opening Round Phase 2	Rotterdam, Netherlands	Decision (unanimous)	3	3:00
2025-04-05	Loss	(Romania) Ionuț Iancu	Glory 99 - Last Heavyweight Standing, Opening Round	Rotterdam, Netherlands	TKO (retirement)	1	3:00
2024-10-12	Loss	(Romania) Ionuț Iancu	Glory 96	Rotterdam, Netherlands	TKO (3 Knockdowns)	2	2:59
2024-03-09	Win	(Poland) Michał Bławdziewicz	Glory Heavyweight Grand Prix, reserve fight	Arnhem, Netherlands	KO (punches)	2	2:55
2023-12-23	Win	(Poland) Michal Blawdziewicz	Glory 90	Rotterdam, Netherlands	Decision (Unanimous)	3	3:00
2022-08-20	NC	(Algeria) Nordine Mahieddine	Glory 81: Ben Saddik vs. Adegbuyi 2	Düsseldorf, Germany	No Contest (Overturned)	1	2:52
Originally a KO win for Kepenek, changed to a no contest after he tested positive for a banned substance.
2021-07-10	Win	(Austria) Thomas Froschauer	Army of Fighters 1	Istanbul, Turkey	KO (Punches)	1	2:25
Wins the ISKA Muaythai World Super Heavyweight title.
2019-12-21	Loss	(Algeria) Nordine Mahieddine	Glory Collision 2	Arnhem, Netherlands	Ext. R Decision (Split)	4	3:00
2019-05-17	Win	(Australia) Junior Tafa	Glory 65: Utrecht	Utrecht, Netherlands	Decision (Unanimous)	3	3:00
2018-04-14	Loss	(Suriname) Sergio Pique	World Fight Night	Gebze, Istanbul	Decision (Unanimous)	3	3:00
2017-10-21	Win	(Greece) Tasos Karagiandis	Orion Fight Arena	Ankara, Turkey	TKO (Punches)	1	
2016-09-30	Win	(Ukraine) Yuri Gorbenko	Prestige Fights 2	Cyprus	Decision (Unanimous)	3	3:00
2016-04-16	Loss	(Slovakia) Tomáš Možný	Glory 29: Copenhagen	Copenhagen, Denmark	Ext. R. Decision (Unanimous)	4	3:00
2016-02-28	Loss	(Netherlands) Levi Rigters	Anadolu Arena 9	Tokat, Turkey	Decision	3	3:00
2013-12-04	Loss	(Poland) Paul Slowinski	A1 World Grand Prix 2013	Melbourne	TKO (Punches)	1	2:53
2013-06-03	Loss	(France) Patrice Quarteron	A-1 World Combat Cup	Istanbul, Turkey	Decision (Unanimous)	3	3:00
2013-08-13	Win	(Australia) Hamed Allouche	A1	Melbourne, Australia	TKO (Punches)	1	
2012-09-	Win	(Turkey) Harun Ozgun	Prestige Fights 2	Turkey	KO (Right hook)	1	
Legend: Win Loss Draw/No contest Notes

Amateur Kickboxing Record
Date	Result	Opponent	Event	Location	Method	Round	Time
2015-10-29	Loss	(Croatia) Ante Verunica	W.A.K.O World Championships 2015, Quarterfinals	Belgrade, Serbia	Decision (Split)	3	2:00
2015-10-28	Win	(Finland) Pirkka Suksi	W.A.K.O World Championships 2015, First Round	Belgrade, Serbia	Decision (Unanimous)	3	2:00
Legend: Win Loss Draw/No contest Notes

== See also ==
- List of male kickboxers
