= Fabrice Aurieng =

French Savate kickboxer

- Born: Fabrice Jean Andre Aurieng; December 7, 1981 (age 44); Sainte-Clotilde, La Réunion, France
- Other names: Big Boy
- Nationality: French
- Height: 1.97 m (6 ft 5 1/2 in)
- Weight: 108 kg (238 lb; 17 st 0 lb)
- Division: Heavyweight
- Style: Kickboxing, Savate
- Stance: Southpaw
- Fighting out of: Marseille, Bouches-du-Rhône, France

Professional boxing record
- Total: 35
- Wins: 25
- By knockout: 3
- Losses: 8
- By knockout: 3
- Draws: 1
- No contests: 1

Kickboxing record
- Total: 210
- Wins: 200
- By knockout: 89
- Losses: 10

Other information
- Boxing record from BoxRec

Fabrice Jean Andre Aurieng (born 7 December 1981) is a French former professional kickboxer and professional boxer who competed from 2007 to 2023.

== Kickboxing record ==
Professional kickboxing record
Date	Result	Opponent	Event	Location	Method	Round	Time
2023-02-04	Loss	(Poland) Michal Turynski	Boxing Fighters System Event 3	Nimes, France	KO	3	
For the WKN K-1 World Heavyweight Championship.
2022-12-03	Loss	(Poland) Michal Turynski	Run Fight Trophy	Saint-Pierre, Réunion	TKO (doctor stoppage)	3	
For the WKN K-1 World Heavyweight Championship.
2018-11-24	Loss	(Belgium) Thomas Vanneste	Nuit Des Champions	France	Decision	3	3:00
2018-09-22	Win	(Belgium) Othmane Hacine	Le Trophée Des Etoiles	Aix-en-Provence, France	Decision	3	3:00
2017-11-24	Loss	(Russia) Mikhail Tyuterev	-95 kg KFWC savate pro Semi Finals	France	KO (straight right)	1	
2017-06-30	Loss	(Ukraine) Roman Kryklia	Monte Carlo Fighting Masters	Monte Carlo, Monaco	TKO (towel thrown)	2	
For the H.S.H. Prince Albert II of Monaco's Cup -94.2 kg. and Monte Carlo Fighting Masters Heavyweight Championship.
2016-11-19	NC	(Czech Republic) Ondřej Hutník	Nuit des Champions 2016	Marseille, France	No contest	4	
For the WKN World Oriental Rules Super Heavyweight Championship and NDC K-1 rules heavyweight +100 kg title. Originally a KO win for Hutník, later ruled a NC after Hutník failed a drug test.
2016-05-19	Win	(Spain) Frank Muñoz	Capital Fights	Paris, France	Decision	3	3:00
2016-03-06	Win	(Italy) Luca Panto	MFC4	France	Decision	3	3:00
2015-11-14	Win	(Croatia) Mladen Brestovac	La 22ème Nuit Des Champions	Marseille, France	Decision	5	3:00
Wins The NDC K-1 rules heavyweight +100 kg title.
2015-09-12	Win	(Czech Republic) Miroslav Stverak	Battle of Saint-Raphael 3	Saint-Raphaël, France	Decision	3	3:00
2015-08-04	Win	(Turkey) Yuksel Ayaydin	Fight Night Saint-Tropez	Saint Tropez, France	Decision	4	2:00
2015-02-21	Win	(France) Nordine Mahieddine	Stars Night	Vitrolles, France	TKO	3	
Wins ISKA European K-1 Rules Title.
2014-06-07	Win	(Belgium) Mamadou Keta	Gala du Phenix Muaythai 6	Trets, France	TKO (corner stop.)		
2012-11-09	Loss	(Réunion) Abdarhmane Coulibaly	Maxi Fight 4	Saint-Denis, Réunion	Decision	3	3:00
2011-10-15	Win	(France) German Talbot	TK2 World Max 2011: Fight Code Final 8	Marseille, France	Decision	3	3:00
2011-05-27	Win	(France) Nicolas Wamba	K-1 Kick Tournament in Marseille, Final	Marseille, France	Decision	3	3:00
Wins The K-1 Kick Tournament in Marseille tournament title.
2011-05-27	Win	(France) Nordine Mahieddine	K-1 Kick Tournament in Marseille, Semi Finals	Marseille, France	Decision	3	3:00
2011-04-30	Win	(Australia) Eric Nosa	Run Fight Trophy	France	KO	3	
2010-01-29	Loss	(France) Nicolas Wamba	K-1 Kick Tournament in Marseille, Final	Marseille, France	Decision	3	3:00
For The K-1 Kick Tournament in Marseille tournament title.
2010-01-29	Win	(France) Goncalo Salvado	K-1 Kick Tournament in Marseille, Semi Finals	Marseille, France	Decision	3	3:00
2009-12-18	Draw	(France) Grégory Tony	Trophée Bad Panther	Stade Michel Volnay, Réunion	Decision draw	5	3:00
For The WKBC Heavyweight world title.
2009-02-06	Win	(Spain) Damian Garcia	K-1 Kick Tournament in Marseille, Final	Marseille, France	KO		
Wins K-1 Kick Tournament in Marseille tournament title.
2009-02-06	Win	(Spain) Frank Muñoz	K-1 Kick Tournament in Marseille, Semi Finals	Marseille, France	Decision	3	3:00
2009	Win	(France) Frederic Heini	Savate Finals Elite 2009	France	Decision	N&A	N&A
2008	Win	(France) Sissoko	Savate Finals Elite 2008	France	Decision	N&A	N&A
2007-10-12	Loss	(France) Patrice Quarteron	A-1 World Combat Cup	Ankara, Turkey	KO (knee strike)	1	
Legend: Win Loss Draw/No contest Notes

== Professional boxing record ==
19 fights	11 wins	8 losses
By knockout	3	3
By decision	8	5

No.	Result	Record	Opponent	Type	Round, time	Date	Location	Notes
19	Win	11–8	Alban Galonnier	UD	6	27 Nov 2015	Salle Vallier, Marseille, France	
18	Loss	10–8	David Allen	PTS	6	24 Oct 2015	Sheffield Arena, Sheffield, England	
17	Loss	10–7	Cyril Leonet	RTD	8 (10)	5 Jun 2015	Parc des Sports, Pont-Audemer, France	For French heavyweight title
16	Win	10–6	Larry Olubamiwo	PTS	6	15 Nov 2014	Salle Louison Bobet, Aix-en-Provence, France	
15	Win	9–6	Edgars Kalnars	RTD	1 (6), 3:00	21 Jun 2014	Parc Municipal, Marseille, France	
14	Win	8–6	Raphael Zumbano Love	UD	12	17 Oct 2013	Palace de Villiers, Sarcelles, France	Won vacant WBF International and UBO World heavyweight titles
13	Loss	7–6	Johann Duhaupas	KO	4 (10)	22 Jun 2013	Salle omnisports, Abbeville, France	Lost French heavyweight title
12	Loss	7–5	Kyotaro Fujimoto	TKO	7 (8), 1:11	17 Apr 2013	Korakuen Hall, Tokyo, Japan	
11	Win	7–4	Grégory Tony	TD	5 (10)	15 Mar 2013	Salle Mermoz, Yutz, France	Won vacant French heavyweight title
10	Loss	6–4	Cyril Leonet	PTS	8	23 Mar 2012	Salle des Congres, Saint-Junien, France	Semi Finals of the League Cup
9	Win	6–3	Jakov Gospic	KO	2 (10)	21 Jan 2012	Palais Des Sports, Le Gosier, France	Won vacant UBO Inter-Continental heavyweight title
8	Win	5–3	Muhammed Ali Durmaz	KO	2 (8)	9 Sep 2011	Stade Jean-Ivoula, Saint-Denis, France	
7	Win	4–3	Igoris Borucha	PTS	6	1 Jul 2011	Salle Caq de la Marie, Marseille, France	
6	Win	3–3	Alban Galonnier	PTS	6	21 May 2011	Salle Jean Moulin, Agde, France	Semi Finals of French Tournament
5	Loss	2–3	Cyril Leonet	PTS	6	18 Mar 2011	Salle des Congres, Saint-Junien, France	
4	Loss	2–2	Mickael Vieira	PTS	6	11 Feb 2011	Salle Pierre Jablonski, Chateauroux, France	
3	Loss	2–1	Mickael Vieira	PTS	6	4 Dec 2010	Gymnase Halle des Sports, Montluçon, France	
2	Win	2–0	Tomas Mrazek	PTS	6	6 Nov 2010	Complexe sportif du Val de l'Arc, Aix-en-Provence, France	
1	Win	1–0	Tomas Mrazek	UD	6	17 Jul 2010	Parc Municipal, Marseille, France	

== Championships and accomplishments ==
- Kickboxing
  - Professional
  - 2015 NDC K-1 rules heavyweight +100 kg Champion
  - 2015 ISKA European K-1 Rules Champion
  - 2011 K-1 Kick Tournament in Marseille Tournament Champion
  - 2010 K-1 Kick Tournament in Marseille Tournament Champion
  - 2009 K-1 Kick Tournament in Marseille Tournament Champion
  - Amateur
  - 2004 French Champion
  - 2003 French Champion
  - 2001, 2002, 2003 La Réunion Champion
- Savate
  - 2009 2013 World Champion
  - 2008, 2010 European Champion
  - 2008, 2009, 2010, 2013 2016 French Champion Elite
  - 2007 Vice-champion of France
  - 2005 French Champion Honneur
- Boxing
  - Professional - 11 wins, 8 losses
  - 2013 World Boxing Federation International heavyweight Champion
  - 2013 Wins vacant Universal Boxing Organization (UBO) World heavyweight Champion
  - 2013 French Heavyweight Champion
  - 2012 Universal Boxing Organization (UBO) InterContinental Heavyweight Champion
  - Amateur
  - 2007 Island Games Champion
  - 2007 Elite France Semi Finalist
  - 2007 champion d’Aquitaine

== See also ==
- List of male kickboxers
