= Yüksel Ayaydın =

Turkish kickboxer

- Born: October 2, 1989 (age 37); Turkey
- Nationality: Turkish
- Height: 1.84 m (6 ft 1/2 in)
- Weight: 105 kg (231 lb; 16 st 7 lb)
- Division: Heavyweight
- Style: Kickboxing
- Stance: Orthodox
- Fighting out of: Paris, France
- Team: Team NAS-R K.
- Trainer: Nasser Kacem
- Years active: 2006 - 2018

Kickboxing record
- Total: 38
- Wins: 23
- By knockout: 5
- Losses: 14
- Draws: 1

Yüksel Ayaydın is a Turkish retired kickboxer who professionally competed from 2006 until 2018. He is the former WFC European Heavyweight Muaythai Champion, as well as the former WMC World Heavyweight Champion.

== Kickboxing career ==
Yuksel Ayaydin made his professional debut in 2006, during La Grande Sfida sui 4 Angoli, when he faced Tihamer Brunner. He would lose a unanimous decision. He would lose his next bout against Konstantin Gluhov as well.

Following his two debut losses, Ayaydin bounced back with a three fight winning streak, most notably defeating Pierre Celestin Yana. This would be followed by a three fight losing streak.

Ayaydin then amassed a five fight unbeaten streak, with notable wins over Lucian Danilencu and Abdarhmane Coulibaly, which earned him the chance to fight for the FFMDA Heavyweight title. Entering the tournament he won a unanimous decision against Frederic Heine in the semi-finals, as well as a unanimous decision over Daniel Lentie to clinch the championship.

After winning his first major honor, Ayadin went on a 4–3 run, with wins over Agron Preteni and Wendell Roche. Entering the Impact Night Heavyweight Tournament, he lost in the first round to Freddy Kemayo.

In 2013 he was scheduled to fight for the WMC heavyweight title against Igor Mihaljević. He won a unanimous decision.

In 2014 he entered the FK ONE Heavyweight Tournament, but lost to Freddy Kemayo in the finals.

He had his last professional fight in 2018, losing a unanimous decision to Roman Kryklia during MFC 7.

Ayaydın returned to professional competition on September 22, 2022, as he was booked to face Giuseppe Dominico at MFC 9.

== Championships and accomplishments ==
- Fédération française de kick boxing, muay thaï et disciplines associées
  - FFMDA Heavyweight Championship
- World Fighting Championships
  - WFC European Heavyweight Muaythai Championship
- World Muaythai Council
  - WMC World Heavyweight Championship

== Kickboxing record ==
Kickboxing record
23 wins (5 (T)KOs), 14 losses, 1 draw
Date	Result	Opponent	Event	Location	Method	Round	Time	Record
2018-05-03	Loss	(Ukraine) Roman Kryklia	MFC 7	Saint-Priest, France	Decision (unanimous)	3	3:00	23–14–1
2017-12-16	Win	(Serbia) Mihajlo Kecojević	La Nuit Des Challenges 17	Saint-Fons, France	Decision (unanimous)	3	3:00	23–13–1
2017-03-09	Win	(Moldova) Dragoș Zubco	MFC 6	Saint-Priest, France	TKO	2	3:00	22–13–1
2016-04-30	Win	(France) Bangaly Keïta	MFC 5	Lons-le-Saunier, France	Decision (unanimous)	3	3:00	21–13–1
2016-03-12	Win	(Belgium) Noureddine Tamagroute	Divonne Muay Thai Challenge	Divonne-les-Bains, France	TKO	2	3:00	20–13–1
2015-12-11	Loss	(Belgium) Yassine Boughanem	Best Of Siam 7	Paris, France	Decision (unanimous)	3	3:00	19–13–1
2015-10-10	Loss	(France) Nicolas Wamba	World GBC Tour	Mazan, France	Decision (unanimous)	3	3:00	19–12–1
2015-08-04	Loss	(France) Fabrice Aurieng	Fight Night	Saint-Tropez, France	Decision (unanimous)	3	3:00	19–11–1
2015-06-12	Win	(Cuba) Daniel Pérez	Strike Fight	Lyon, France	Decision (unanimous)	3	3:00	19–10–1
2015-03-06	Win	(Belgium) Thomas Vanneste	Muaythai Fighting Championship	Saint-Priest, France	Decision (unanimous)	3	3:00	18–10–1
2014-06-27	Win	(Italy) Domenico Deserio	Strike Fight	Lyon, France	TKO	2	3:00	17–10–1
2014-05-31	Win	(France) Freddy Kemayo	FK ONE, Tournament Final	Goussainville, France	Decision (unanimous)	3	3:00	16–10–1
For the FK ONE Heavyweight Tournament title.
2014-05-31	Win	(France) Gaetan Sautron	FK ONE, Tournament Semifinal	Goussainville, France	Decision (unanimous)	3	3:00	16–9–1
2013-09-21	Win	(Croatia) Igor Mihaljević	La Nuit Des Challenges 12	Saint-Fons, France	Decision (unanimous)	3	3:00	15–9–1
Wins the WMC Heavyweight Title.
2013-02-22	Win	(Australia) Jono Almond	A1 World Grand Prix 2013	Flemington, Australia	KO	4	3:00	14–9–1
2012-09-19	Win	(France) Zinedine Hameur-Lain	Thai Fight Lyon	Lyon, France	Decision (unanimous)	3	3:00	13–9–1
2012-04-28	Loss	(Spain) Frank Muñoz	Le Banner Series: acte 1	Geneva, Switzerland	Decision (unanimous)	3	3:00	12–9–1
2012-02-25	Loss	(Romania) Raul Cătinaș	SUPERKOMBAT World Grand Prix 2012	Podgorica, Montenegro	Decision (unanimous)	3	3:00	12–8–1
2011-11-26	Loss	(France) Freddy Kemayo	Impact Night: Fight Code Final, Tournament Semifinal	Geneva, Switzerland	Decision (unanimous)	3	3:00	12–7–1
2011-10-22	Win	(Slovakia) Thomas Kohut	W5 Grand Prix Moscow	Moscow, Russia	Decision (unanimous)	3	3:00	12–6–1
2011-05-14	Win	(Netherlands) Wendell Roche	It's Showtime 2011 Lyon	Lyon, France	Decision (unanimous)	3	3:00	11–6–1
2011-03-18	Loss	(Romania) Cătălin Moroșanu	SUPERKOMBAT: The Pilot Show	Râmnicu Vâlcea, Romania	Decision (unanimous)	3	3:00	10–6–1
2011-02-05	Win	(Croatia) Agron Preteni	Ring Of Honor, NBB2	Nitra, Slovakia	Decision (unanimous)	3	3:00	10–5–1
2011-01-22	Win	(Cameroon) Daniel Lentie	Championnat du Monde de K1-Rules, Tournament Final	Strasbourg, France	Decision (unanimous)	3	3:00	9–5–1
Wins the FFMDA Heavyweight Title.
2011-01-22	Win	(France) Frederic Heine	Championnat du Monde de K1-Rules, Tournament Semifinal	Strasbourg, France	Decision (unanimous)	3	3:00	8–5–1
2010-10-15	Win	(France) Abdarhmane Coulibaly	Maxi Fight 2	Saint-Denis, Réunion, France	Decision (unanimous)	3	3:00	7–5–1
2010-07-23	Win	(France) Alban Galonnier	Le Choc Des Gladiateurs IX	Le Lavandou, France	Decision (unanimous)	3	3:00	6–5–1
2010-06-05	Win	(Romania) Lucian Danilencu	La Nuit Des Challenges 8	Saint-Fons, France	Decision (unanimous)	3	3:00	5–5–1
2010-02-27	Draw	(France) Stéphane Susperregui	La Nuit du Muay Thai VII	Pau, France	Decision (unanimous)	3	3:00	4–5–1
2009-07-11	Win	(Montenegro) ?	Diamond Fight World Tour 2	Marrakesh, Morocco	Decision (unanimous)	3	3:00	4–5
2009-04-12	Loss	(Bosnia and Herzegovina) Dževad Poturak	Local Kombat 33	Oradea, Romania	Decision (unanimous)	3	3:00	3–5
2009-01-31	Loss	(France) Brice Guidon	La Nuit des Titans : T8 World Final	Tours, France	Decision (unanimous)	3	3:00	3–4
2008-12-20	Loss	(Czech Republic) Luboš Šuda	K-1 Fighting Network	Prague, Czech Republic	Decision (unanimous)	3	3:00	3–3
2008-10-25	Win	(Cameroon) Pierre Celestin Yana	Le Choc des Best Fighters 1	Asnières-sur-Seine, France	Decision (unanimous)	3	3:00	3–2
2008-06-07	Win	(France) Sofiane Azi	La Nuit Des Challenges 5	Saint-Fons, France	Decision (unanimous)	3	3:00	2–2
2008-02-16	Win	(Belgium) Ben Petit	Tournoi L1 -63,5 kg	Tournai, Belgium	KO	3	3:00	1–2
2007-02-16	Loss	(Latvia) Konstantin Gluhov	A1 Kickbox	Turkey	Decision (unanimous)	3	3:00	0–2
2006-07-07	Loss	(Hungary) Tihamer Brunner	La Grande Sfida sui 4 Angoli	Riccione, Italy	Decision (unanimous)	3	3:00	0–1
Legend: Win Loss Draw/no contest Notes

== See also ==
- List of male kickboxers
