= Nordine Mahieddine =

French kickboxer

- Born: December 11, 1989 (age 36); Marseille, France
- Other names: The Bear
- Height: 1.88 m (6 ft 2 in)
- Weight: 110 kg (243 lb; 17 st 5 lb)
- Division: Light Heavyweight Heavyweight
- Style: Kickboxing
- Stance: Orthodox
- Fighting out of: Utrecht, Netherlands
- Team: SB Gym
- Trainer: Said El Badaoui
- Years active: 2008 – present

Kickboxing record
- Total: 47
- Wins: 29
- By knockout: 13
- Losses: 17
- By knockout: 5
- Draws: 0
- No contests: 1

Nordine Mahieddine (born 11 December 1989) is an Algerian-French kickboxer, currently competing in the heavyweight division of Glory. He also competed for SUPERKOMBAT Fighting Championship and World Fighting League.

Between July 2021 and September 2022, Mahieddine was ranked as a top ten heavyweight according to Combat Press.

== Professional kickboxing career ==
=== Early career ===
Mahieddine made his professional debut against Issam Reghi at Kickboxing Championnat D'Europe on December 19, 2008. He won the fight by decision. He would go on to amass a 12–5 record, mostly competing on the French circuit, before beginning to compete in European tournaments.

Mahieddine faced Bas Vorstenbosch in the semifinals of the K1 Event 8 heavyweight tournament, held on February 20, 2016. He beat Bas by decision. He won the tournament with a decision victory against Abderhamane Coulibaly in the tournament finals.

Mahieddine was scheduled to face Marco Manetti at Boxe Evenements 13 on March 26, 2016. He won the fight by a first-round knockout.

Mahieddine took part in the Partouche Kickboxing Tour heavyweight tournament, held on July 22, 2016. He was scheduled to face Farid Nair in the tournament semifinals. It was the third overall meeting between the two, with Mahieddine both of their previous fights. Mahieddine was as successful in their third encounter as he was in the first two, winning by a first-round knockout. He fought Dragos Zubco in the finals, and won by a third-round knockout.

Mahieddine made his Glory debut against Nicolas Wamba at Glory 35: Nice on November 5, 2016. Wamba won the fight by decision.

Mahieddine fought Saša Polugić for the WAKO European Heavyweight title at XI eme Trophée Des Etoiles on April 8, 2017. He won the fight by a third-round knockout.

Mahieddine was scheduled to face Peter Aerts at the April 23, 2017 event. Aerts won the fight by decision.

Mahieddine was scheduled to fight Daniel Sam at Capital Fights 2 on May 20, 2017. Sam won the fight by decision.

Mahieddine fought Tarik Khbabez at the October 29, 2017, event. Khbabez won the fight by decision.

Mahieddine was scheduled to face Roman Kryklia at the November 25, 2017 NDC event. Kryklia won the fight by decision.

Mahieddine took part in the 2018 World Fighting League heavyweight tournament, held on September 22, 2018, and was scheduled to face Fred Sikking in the quarterfinals. He beat Sikking by decision, and beat Andrei Stoica in the semifinals in the same manner. Mahieddine lost to Murat Aygün in the tournament finals by decision.

=== GLORY ===
Mahieddine made his second appearance with the promotion against Antonio Plazibat at Glory 66: Paris on June 22, 2019. Plazibat won the fight by unanimous decision.

Mahieddine was scheduled to face Kiril Kornilov at Glory 70: Lyon on October 26, 2019. He won the fight by unanimous decision.

Mahieddine was scheduled to fight Cihad Kepenek at Glory Collision 2 on December 21, 2019. He won the fight by split decision, after an extra round was fought.

Mahieddine participated in a four-man, one night tournament at Glory 76: Rotterdam on December 19, 2020. He fought a rematch with Antonio Plazibat in the semifinals, while the other semifinal pairing consisted of Levi Rigters and Marciano Bhagwandass. Mahieddine beat Plazibat by a close split decision, after an extra round was fought, and faced Rigters in the tournament finals. Rigters won the fight by a first-round knockout.

Mahieddine was scheduled to face Raul Cătinaș at Glory 78: Rotterdam on September 4, 2021. He won the fight by unanimous decision.

Mahieddine was booked to rematch Cihad Kepenek at Glory 81: Ben Saddik vs. Adegbuyi 2 on August 20, 2022. He lost the fight by a first-round knockout. The result was overturned to a no contest on November 24, as Kepenek tested positive for a banned substance.

Mahieddine made his light heavyweight debut against Felipe Micheletti at Glory 84 on March 11, 2023. He lost the fight by unanimous decision.

Mahieddine faced Abdarhmane Coulibaly at Glory 88 on September 9, 2023. He won the fight by a third-round knockout.

Mahieddine was expected to face Benjamin Adegbuyi in a reserve Heavyweight Grand Prix at Glory Heavyweight Grand Prix on March 9, 2024. He later withdrew from the bout, as Glory placed him in the Glory Heavyweight Grand Prix as a replacement for the injured Antonio Plazibat. Mahieddine was expected to face Nabil Khachab in the Grand Prix quarterfinals on March 9, 2024. He was pulled from the fight by the promotion.

Mahieddine faced Nikola Filipović at Glory 95 on September 21, 2024.

Mahieddine faced Antonio Plazibat in a rematch at Glory Collision 8 in a Glory Last Heavyweight Standing Finals Tournament qualifier on December 13, 2025. He lost the fight by unanimous decision.

== Championships and accomplishments ==
- World Association of Kickboxing Organizations
  - 2017 WAKO K-1 European Heavyweight Championship
- GLORY
  - 2023 GLORY Knockout of the Year (vs Abdarhmane Coulibaly

== Kickboxing record ==
Kickboxing record
29 Wins (13 KOs), 17 Losses, 1 No Contest
Date	Result	Opponent	Event	Location	Method	Round	Time	Record
2026-12-05		(Romania) Vasile Amariței	SENSHI 34 - Heavyweight Grand Prix, Quarterfinals	Varna, Bulgaria				
2026-10-17	Loss	(Morocco) Nidal Bchiri	Glory 110	Antwerp, Belgium	KO (Body kick)	1	2:29	29-17 (1)
2025-12-13	Loss	(Croatia) Antonio Plazibat	Glory Collision 8	Arnhem, Netherlands	Decision (Unanimous)	3	3:00	29-16 (1)
2024-09-21	Win	(Serbia) Nikola Filipović	Glory 95	Zagreb, Croatia	Decision (Split)	3	3:00	29–15 (1)
2023-09-09	Win	(France) Abdarhmane Coulibaly	Glory 88	Paris, France	KO (High kick)	3	2:19	28–15 (1)
2023-03-11	Loss	(Brazil) Felipe Micheletti	Glory 84	Rotterdam, Netherlands	Decision (Unanimous)	3	3:00	27–15 (1)
2022-08-20	NC	(Turkey) Cihad Kepenek	Glory 81: Ben Saddik vs. Adegbuyi 2	Düsseldorf, Germany	No Contest	1	2:52	27–14 (1)
Originally a KO win for Kepenek, changed to a no contest after he tested positive for a banned substance.
2021-09-04	Win	(Romania) Raul Cătinaș	Glory 78: Rotterdam	Rotterdam, Netherlands	Decision (Unanimous)	3	3:00	27–14
2020-12-19	Loss	(Netherlands) Levi Rigters	Glory 76: Rotterdam, Tournament Final	Rotterdam, Netherlands	KO (Front kick)	1	1:49	26–14
2020-12-19	Win	(Croatia) Antonio Plazibat	Glory 76: Rotterdam, Tournament Semifinal	Rotterdam, Netherlands	Ext. R Decision (Split)	4	3:00	26–13
2019-12-21	Win	(Turkey) Cihad Kepenek	Glory Collision 2	Arnhem, Netherlands	Ext. R Decision (Split)	4	3:00	25–13
2019-10-26	Win	(Russia) Kiril Kornilov	Glory 70: Lyon	Lyon, France	Decision (Unanimous)	3	3:00	24–13
2019-06-22	Loss	(Croatia) Antonio Plazibat	Glory 66: Paris	Paris, France	Decision (Unanimous)	3	3:00	23–13
2018-09-22	Loss	(Turkey) Murat Aygün	World Fighting League, Tournament Final	Almere, Netherlands	Decision	3	3:00	20–12
2018-09-22	Win	(Romania) Andrei Stoica	World Fighting League, Tournament Semifinal	Almere, Netherlands	Decision (split)	3	3:00	20–11
2018-09-22	Win	(Netherlands) Fred Sikking	World Fighting League, Tournament Quarterfinal	Almere, Netherlands	Decision	3	3:00	19–11
2017-11-25	Loss	(Ukraine) Roman Kryklia	Nuit Des Champions	Marseille, France	Decision (Unanimous)	3	3:00	18–11
2017-10-29	Loss	(Morocco) Tarik Khbabez	World Fighting League	Almere, Netherlands	Decision	3	3:00	18–10
2017-05-20	Loss	(England) Daniel Sam	Capital Fights 2	Paris, France	Decision	3	3:00	18–9
2017-04-23	Loss	(Netherlands) Peter Aerts	World Fighting League	Almere, Netherlands	Decision	3	3:00	18–8
2017-04-08	Win	(Serbia) Saša Polugić	XI eme Trophée Des Etoiles	Gardanne, France	KO	3		18–7
Wins the vacant WAKO K-1 European Heavyweight title.
2016-11-05	Loss	(France) Nicolas Wamba	Glory 35: Nice	Nice, France	Decision (Unanimous)	3	3:00	17–7
2016-07-22	Win	(Moldova) Dragoș Zubco	Partouche Kickboxing Tour, Tournament Final	La Grande-Motte, France	KO	1		17–6
Wins the Partouche Kickboxing Tour Heavyweight Tournament.
2016-07-22	Win	(France) Farid Nair	Partouche Kickboxing Tour, Tournament Semifinal	La Grande-Motte, France	KO	1		16–6
2016-03-26	Win	(France) Marco Manetti	Boxe Evenements 13	La Fare-les-Oliviers, France	KO	1		15–6
2016-02-20	Win	(France) Abderhamane Coulibaly	K1 Event 8, Tournament Final	Troyes, France	Decision	3	3:00	14–6
Wins the K-1 Event 8 Heavyweight Tournament.
2016-02-20	Win	(Netherlands) Bas Vorstenbosch	K1 Event 8, Tournament Semifinal	Troyes, France	Decision	3	3:00	13–6
2015-02-21	Loss	(France) Fabrice Aurieng	Stars Night	Vitrolles, Bouches-du-Rhône, France	TKO	3		12–6
2014-10-25	Loss	(Switzerland) Volkan Oezdemir	SUPERKOMBAT World Grand Prix Final Elimination	Geneva, Switzerland	Decision (majority)	3	3:00	12–5
2014-04-26	Win	(France) Gaetan Sautron	Trophée Etoiles VIII	Aix-en-Provence, France	Decision	3	3:00	12–4
2013-06-15	Win	(Belarus) Andrey Gerasimchuk	The Battle of Saint-Raphael	Saint-Raphaël, Var, France	Decision	3	3:00	11–4
2013-05-18	Loss	(Lithuania) Arnold Oborotov	Urban Boxing United 2013	Marseille, France	KO	2		10–4
2013-01-26	Win	(Belgium) Mohamed Benyaich	Stars night	Vitrolles, Bouches-du-Rhône, France	KO	2		10–3
2012-12-15	Win	(France) Farid Nair	Championnat du Monde K1 rules	Saint-Raphaël, Var, France	KO	2		9–3
2012-10-27	Win	(France) Farid Nair	F-1 World Max Tournament 2012	Meyreuil, France	Decision	3		8–3
2012-05-19	Win	(France) Noël Cadet	Urban Boxing United 2012	Marseille, France	KO	1		7–3
2011-06-18	Win	(Italy) Giusepe Alicata	Grand Gala De Boxe	Grasse, France	KO	2		6–3
2011-05-27	Loss	(France) Fabrice Aurieng	K1 Rules Tournament X	Marseille, France	Decision (Unanimous)	3	3:00	5–3
2011-05-07	Win	(France) Cyril Assentio	Urban Boxing United 2011	Marseille, France	TKO (Doctor stoppage)	1		5–2
2011-03-19	Loss	(France) Nicolas Wamba	8ème Trophée de l'Ephèbe	Agde, France	TKO (Doctor stoppage)	4		4–2
2010-07-16	Win	(France) Brahim Bagdadi	All Stars	Saint-Raphaël, Var, France	TKO (Referee stoppage)	4		4–1
2010-05-08	Loss	(France) Stéphane Susperregui	Championnat De France K1	Montélimar, France	Decision (Unanimous)	3	3:00	3–1
For the French National K-1 title.
2010-04-24	Win	(France) Joachim Tomas	La Nuit Des Titans	Saint-André-les-Vergers, France	Decision (Unanimous)	3	3:00	3–0
2010-01-29	Win	(France) Sofiane Azi	KICK TOURNAMENT	Marseille, France	TKO			2–0
2008-12-19	Win	(France) Issam Reghi	Kickboxing Championnat D'Europe	Marseille, France	Decision	3	3:00	1–0
Legend: Win Loss Draw/No contest Notes

== See also ==
- List of male kickboxers
