= Zinedine Hameur-Lain =

French kickboxer (born 1986)

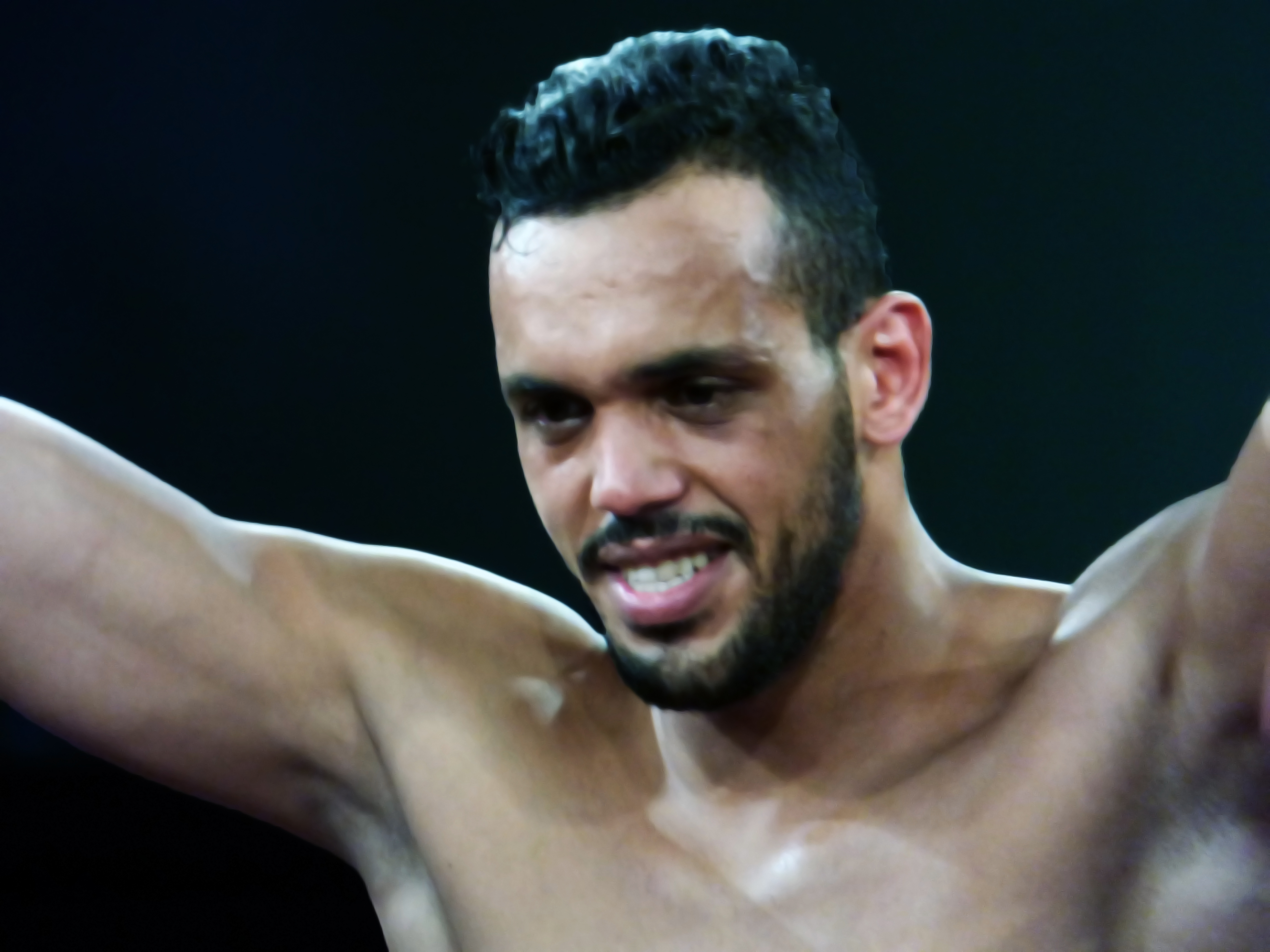
- Born: Zinedine Hameur-Lain; May 26, 1986 (age 40); Oran, Algeria
- Height: 1.92 m (6 ft 3 1/2 in)
- Weight: 95 kg (209 lb; 14 st 13 lb)
- Division: Light heavyweight Heavyweight
- Style: Kickboxing
- Stance: Orthodox
- Fighting out of: Marseille, France
- Team: Good boy Academy
- Trainer: Hocine Belkacem
- Years active: 2006–present

Kickboxing record
- Total: 102
- Wins: 71
- By knockout: 56
- Losses: 28
- By knockout: 18
- Draws: 2
- No contests: 1

Other information
- Boxing record from BoxRec
- Last updated on: September 30, 2020

Zinedine Hameur-Lain (born May 26, 1986) is an Algerian-French kickboxeur, currently signed with Glory. He is the WBC Muaythai World Champion. He has also fought in SUPERKOMBAT.

He was ranked as a top five light heavyweight kickboxer in the world by Combat Press between December 2017 and June 2022. Before that, he was ranked as a top ten light heavyweight by Combat Press from August 2016 to March 2017.

== Martial arts career ==
In 2014, Hameur-Lain fought for the King of the Ring 91 kg title against Corentin Jallon. Hameur-Lain lost the fight in the first round, by TKO.

Hameur-Lain fought for the Emperor Chok Dee Championship heavyweight title in 2015, against Bashirou Ndzemafue. He won the fight in the fourth round by TKO.

He made his Glory debut during Glory 26, against Fred Sikking. Hameur-Lain won the fight by a unanimous decision.

He fought Zack Mwekassa in his second Glory fight, and lost the fight by a unanimous decision.

Hameur-Lain participated in the 2016 Glory Light Heavyweight Contender Tournament. In the semi-finals he defeated Warren Thompson by KO, and in the finals he defeated Ariel Machado by KO as well.

He lost his next fight to Pavel Zhuravlev during Glory 35 by TKO in the first round.

He fought for the WBC Muayhai World Super Cruiserweight against Budimir Bajbić during Emperor Chok Dee. Hameur-Lain won the fight by a first-round KO.

Hameur-Lain will compete in the light heavyweight contender tournament at Glory 38. He will face Zack Mwekassa in the tournament semi-finals. He was scheduled to fight Zack Mwekassa in the semi-finals, but Mwekassa wasn't cleared to fight by the Illinois State Athletic Commission. He was replaced by Brian Collete. Zinedine defeated him with a second round overhand KO. Hemeur-Lain fought Ariel Machado in the finals, but lost the fight in the first round by TKO.

He began a three fight winning streak with a first-round KO of Freddy Kemayo. Hameur-Lain then defeated Raffaele Vitale by a decision, and Michael Duut by TKO.

He fought Felipe Micheletti during Felipe's Glory debut. The fight was first scheduled for Glory 57, but was rescheduled for Glory 60, as Hameur-Lain withdrew with an injury. Micheletti won the fight by TKO, after Hemeur-Lain suffered a hip injury.

He fought Artur Gorlov during Glory 64. At the end of the first round, Gorlov landed a heavy blow to Hameur-Lain's groin, with Hameur-Lain being rendered unable to continue the fight. He won by DQ.

Hameur-Lain fought during Emperor Chok Dee XI, facing Adel Zaripov. He won the fight by TKO, managing to knock Zaripov down three times in the first round.

In 2020, Hameur-Lain signed a new three-year contract with Glory.

== Titles ==
Professional

- 2017 Glory Light Heavyweight Contender Tournament runner-up
- 2017 WBC Muayhai World Super Cruiserweight 95.454 kg Champion
- 2016 Glory Light Heavyweight Contender Tournament winner
- 2015 Emperor Chok Dee Champion -95 kg
- 2014 ICO - Japan Kickboxing World Champion -93 kg
- 2012 Profight Karate Tournament Cruiserweight Champion
- 2010 Peace Heavyweight Tournament runner-up
- 2009 WPMF European Thai Boxing Rules Champion
- 2008 WAKO-Pro European Low-Kick rules Cruiser Heavyweight Champion -94.1 kg
- 2008 All Star Tournament Champion

Amateur

- 2005 World Champion
- 5-time champion of France

== Kickboxing record ==
Professional kickboxing record
72 wins (56 KOs), 27 losses, 2 draws, 1 no contest
Date	Result	Opponent	Event	Location	Method	Round	Time
2026-06-19	Win	(Romania) Andrei Stoica	Dynamite Fighting Show 31	Târgu Jiu, Romania	Kick to a downed opponent	1	2:32
2025-04-26	Loss	(Cape Verde) Iuri Fernandes	Fight Night One 21	Saint-Étienne, France	TKO (shoulder injury)	1	
For the vacant Fight Night One Light Heavyweight title.
2024-12-07	Win	(Netherlands) Karim Cherkaoui	Le Choc des Guerriers 2024, Final	Angouleme, France	KO	1	2:00
2024-12-07	Win	(Romania) Radu Medeleanu	Le Choc des Guerriers 2024, Semifinals	Angouleme, France	KO	1	0:25
2022-11-26	Loss	(Russia) Nikita Kozlov	RCC Fair Fight 19	Yekaterinburg, Russia	KO (flying knee)	2	
2022-05-21	Loss	(France) Anthony Leroy	Stars Night 2022	Vitrolles, France	Decision	3	3:00
2020-02-08	Win	(Russia) Adel Zaripov	Emperor Chok Dee XI	Vandœuvre-lès-Nancy, France	TKO (three knockdowns)	1	
2019-03-09	Win	(Latvia) Artur Gorlov	Glory 64: Strasbourg	Strasbourg, France	DQ (intentional foul)	1	4:45
2018-10-20	Loss	(Brazil) Felipe Micheletti	Glory 60: Lyon	France	TKO (retirement)	1	3:00
2018-05-12	Win	(Netherlands) Michael Duut	Glory 53: Lille	Lille, France	TKO (right hook)	2	1:14
2018-02-10	Win	(Italy) Raffaele Vitale	Emperor Chok Dee	Paris, France	Decision	3	3:00
2017-06-10	Win	(France) Freddy Kemayo	Glory 42: Paris	Paris, France	KO (right hook and head kick)	1	2:35
2017-02-24	Loss	(Brazil) Ariel Machado	Glory 38: Chicago, Final	Hoffman Estates, Illinois, USA	TKO (punches)	1	2:43
For the Glory Light Heavyweight Contender Tournament.
2017-02-24	Win	(United States) Brian Collete	Glory 38: Chicago, Semi-finals	Hoffman Estates, Illinois, USA	KO (overhand right)	2	2:46
2017-02-04	Win	(Serbia) Budimir Bajbić	Emperor Chok Dee	Vandœuvre-lès-Nancy, France	KO	1	
Wins the WBC Muayhai World Super Cruiserweight 95.454 kg Championship.
2016-11-05	Loss	(Ukraine) Pavel Zhuravlev	Glory 35: Nice	Nice, France	TKO (punches)	1	1:58
2016-07-22	Win	(Brazil) Ariel Machado	Glory 32: Virginia, Final	Norfolk, Virginia	KO (strikes)	2	1:00
Wins the Glory Light Heavyweight Contender Tournament.
2016-07-22	Win	(United States) Warren Thompson	Glory 32: Virginia, Semi-finals	Norfolk, Virginia	KO (punch)	1	0:12
2016-04-16	Loss	(Democratic Republic of the Congo) Zack Mwekassa	Glory 29: Copenhagen	Copenhagen, Denmark	Decision (unanimous)	3	3:00
2015-12-04	Win	(Netherlands) Fred Sikking	Glory 26: Amsterdam	Amsterdam, Netherlands	Decision (unanimous)	3	3:00
2015-08-04	Loss	(Spain) Frank Muñoz	Fight Night Saint-Tropez	Saint-Tropez, France	Decision (unanimous)	4	2:00
2015-04-26	Loss	(Netherlands) Sergio Pique	King of the Ring 4	Metz, France	Decision (unanimous)	3	3:00
2015-03-31	Win	(Russia) Dmitri Fevralev	Tatneft Arena World Cup 2015 4th selection 1/8 final (+91 kg)	Kazan, Russia	TKO (ref. stoppage)	2	N/A
2015-03-07	Loss	(Romania) Bogdan Stoica	SUPERKOMBAT World Grand Prix I 2015	Ploiești, Romania	KO (overhand right)	1	N/A
2015-01-31	Win	(France) Bashirou Ndzemafue	Emperor Chok Dee	Nancy, France	TKO (strikes)	4	N/A
Wins Emperor Chok Dee Championship -95 kg.
2014-05-10	Loss	(France) Corentin Jallon	King of the Ring 3	Metz, France	TKO (strikes)	1	N/A
For King of the Ring Championship -91 kg.
2014-03	Draw	(France) Aristote Quitusisa	Choc des Titans 12	France	Decision	3	3:00
2014-02-08	Win	(Croatia) Haris Gredeh	Emperor Chok Dee 6	Nancy, France	KO (strikes)	1	0:14
Wins ICO - Japan Kickboxing World Championship -93 kg.
2013-12-23	Win	(Netherlands) Fabian Gondorf	W5 Grand Prix Moscow	Moscow, Russia	TKO (strikes)	N/A	N/A
2013-11-23	Loss	(France) Jérôme Le Banner	La 20ème Nuit des Champions	Marseille, France	KO (right body shot)	2	0:40
2013-08-30	Loss	(Romania) Andrei Stoica	SUPERKOMBAT New Heroes 5	Târgoviște, Romania	KO (punch)	2	N/A
2013-08-04	Win	(Belgium) Marc Vlieger	Fight Night	Saint Tropez, France	Decision	3	2:00
2013-04-27	Loss	(Czech Republic) Ondřej Hutník	Gala Night Thaiboxing	Žilina, Slovakia	KO (round kick)	1	N/A
2013-03-09	Loss	(Suriname) Redouan Cairo	Monte Carlo Fighting Masters	Monte Carlo, Monaco	TKO (strikes)	3	N/A
Wins WAKO-Pro World K-1 rules Cruiser Heavyweight -94.1 kg Championship.
2012-11-20	Win	(France) Bouhanane	A1 World Combat Cup	Lyon, France	Decision	3	3:00
2012-10-20	Loss	(Belarus) Alexey Ignashov	Tatneft Arena World Cup 2012 Final	Kazan, Russia	Decision (unanimous)	3	3:00
2012-09-19	Loss	(Turkey) Yuksel Ayaydin	Thai Fight: Lyon	Lyon, France	Decision	3	3:00
2012-07-19	Loss	(Ukraine) Tsotne Rogava	Tatneft Arena World Cup 2012 1/2 final (+91 kg)	Kazan, Russia	Decision (unanimous)	4	3:00
2012-06-30	Win	(France) Pacôme Assi	Pro Fight Karaté 4, Final	Levallois-Perret, France	Decision	3	3:00
Wins Profight Karate Tournament Cruiserweight Championship.
2012-06-30	Win	(France) Corentin Jallon	Pro Fight Karaté 4, Semi-finals	Levallois-Perret, France	Decision	3	3:00
2012-05-12	Loss	(France) Abdarhmane Coulibaly	Wicked One Tournament	Paris, France	TKO (strikes)	2	N/A
2012-04-28	Win	(Russia) Andrei Chekhonin	Tatneft Arena World Cup 2012 1st selection 1/4 final (+91 kg)	Kazan, Russia	Decision (unanimous)	4	3:00
2012-03-03	Loss	(Russia) Alexei Papin	Martial Arts Festival "For Russia" - 2	Chelyabinsk, Russia	KO (strikes)	4	N/A
2012-04-28	Win	(Slovakia) Ivan Bartek	Tatneft Arena World Cup 2012 1st selection 1/8 final (+91 kg)	Kazan, Russia	TKO (3 knockdowns)	1	N/A
2012-02-11	Win	(Kazakhstan) Vladimir Toktasynov	Emperor Chok Dee	France	TKO (strikes)	N/A	N/A
2011-12-07	Win	(Germany) Patrick Liedert	A-1 World Combat Cup	Lyon, France	Decision	N/A	N/A
2011-11-19	Loss	(France) Brice Guidon	Time Fight	Tours, France	Decision (unanimous)	3	3:00
2011-03-19	Loss	(Netherlands) Errol Zimmerman	United Glory 13: 2010-2011 World Series Semifinals	Charleroi, Belgium	TKO (referee stoppage)	1	0:33
2011-02-12	Win	(Belgium) Frédéric Sinistra	Les Rois du Ring 3	Meurthe et Moselle, France	KO (strikes)	N/A	N/A
2011-01-07	Loss	(Spain) Lorenzo Javier Jorge	Fight in Spirit	Epernay, France	Decision	3	3:00
2010-11-19	Loss	(France) Abdarhmane Coulibaly	Fight For Peace, Final	France	TKO (strikes)	2	N/A
For Fight For Peace Heavyweight Tournament Championship.
2010-11-19	Win	(France) Musap Gulsari	Fight For Peace, Semi-finals	France	TKO (strikes)	3	N/A
2010–06-04	Win	(Italy) Hicham Tourar	Nitrianska Noc Bojovnikov - Ring of Honor	Nitra, Slovakia	Decision	3	3:00
2010-02-06	Loss	(France) Stéphane Susperregui	Gala de Saumur	France	TKO (strikes)	3	N/A
2009-05-03	Loss	(France) Brice Guidon	Nuit des Sports de Combat	Geneva, Switzerland	Decision (unanimous)	3	3:00
2009	Win	(Suriname) Redouan Cairo		Contrexéville, France	N/A	N/A	N/A
Wins the WPMF European Thai Boxing rules Championship.
2008-12-12	Win	(Croatia) Gordan Jukić	Splendid Grad Prix 2	Budva, Montenegro	KO (strikes)	2	N/A
Wins the WAKO-Pro European Low-Kick rules Cruiser Heavyweight -94.1 kg Championship.
2008-05-11	Loss	(Croatia) Gordan Jukić	Obračun u Ringu 8	Zadar, Croatia	TKO (strikes)	4	N/A
For the WAKO-Pro European K-1 rules Cruiser Heavyweight -94.1 kg Championship.
2007-11-18	Loss	(Bosnia and Herzegovina) Adnan Redžović	WFC 3: Bad Sunday	Domžale, Slovenia	Ext R. decision (unanimous)	4	3:00
2006-09-16	Loss	(Morocco) Mohamed Oudriss	Fight Night Mannheim	Mannheim, Germany	N/A	N/A	N/A
2006-08-18	Loss	(Croatia) Marko Tomasović	K-1 Hungary 2006, Semi-finals	Debrecen, Hungary	N/A	N/A	N/A
2006-08-18	Win	(Hungary) Tihamer Brunner	K-1 Hungary 2006, Quarter-finals	Debrecen, Hungary	N/A	N/A	N/A
Legend: Win Loss Draw/no contest Notes

== See also ==
- List of male kickboxers
