= Pacôme Assi =

French kickboxer

Pacome Assi
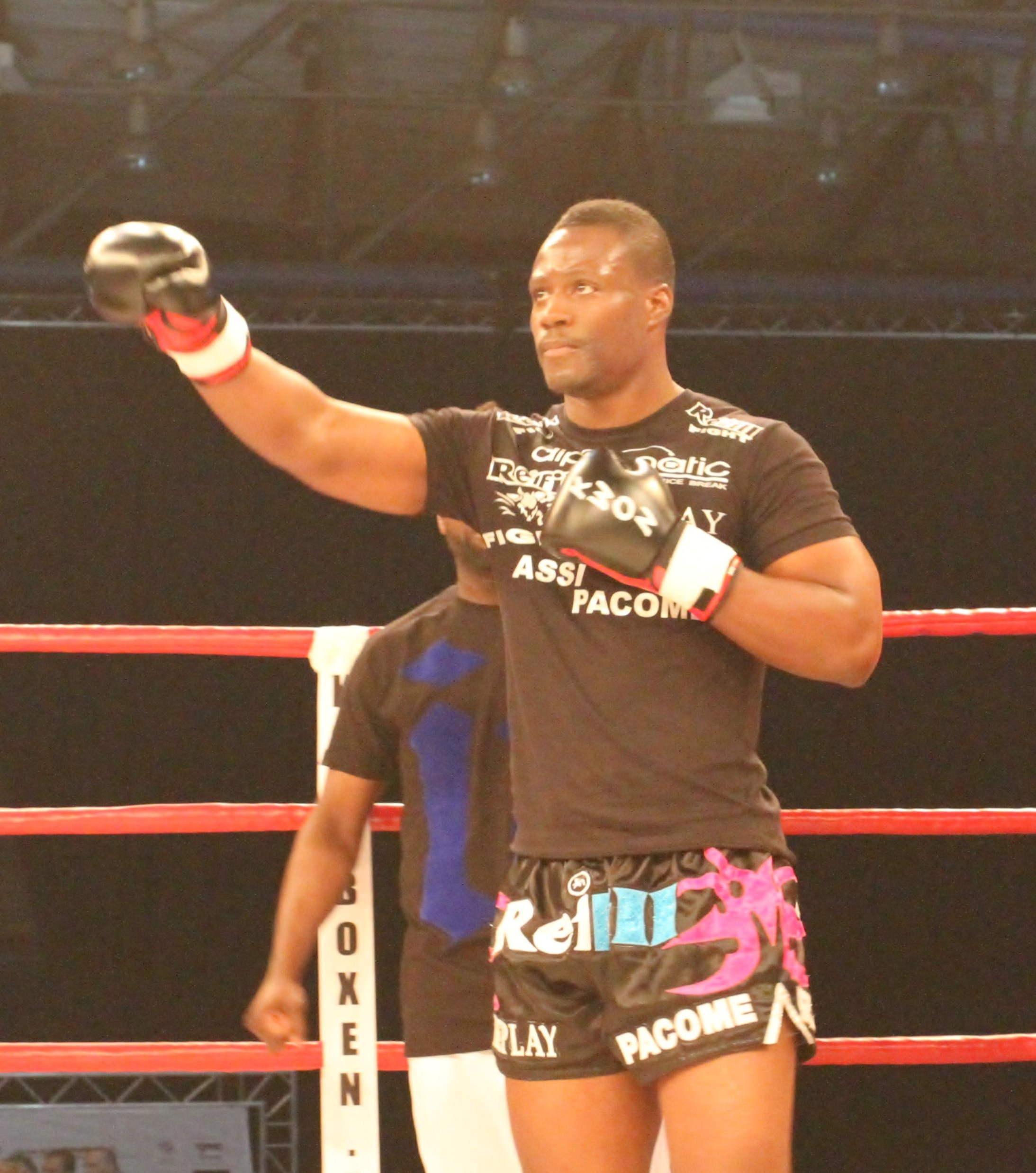
- Born: 25 February 1981 (age 45)
- Nationality: (France) French (Ivory Coast) Ivorian
- Height: 1.87 m (6 ft 1 1/2 in)
- Weight: 95 kg (209 lb; 15.0 st)
- Division: Cruiserweight; Heavyweight
- Style: Kickboxing, karate
- Team: FANTASTIK ARMADA

Kickboxing record
- Total: 68
- Wins: 46
- By knockout: 23
- Losses: 21
- Draws: 1
- Last updated on: 16 August 2017

Pacome Assi (born 25 February 1981) is an Ivorian-French kickboxer and Europe Kick Boxing Champion. He made his K-1 debut in 2009 at K-1 World Grand Prix 2009 in Lodz.

== Career ==
Assi lost to Ondřej Hutník by unanimous decision at Nitrianska Noc Bojovnikov in Nitra, Slovakia on 27 October 2012.

He lost to Bruno Susano in an ISKA world heavyweight -95 kg title fight on points at FK-ONE in Paris, France, on 20 April 2013.

Assi lost to Roman Kriklya via TKO due to a cut in round one at Time Fight 3 in Tours, France on 15 June 2013.

Assi lost on points against Nicolas Wanba at "Warriors night 2" in Paris on 11 October 2014.

He lost to D'Angelo Marshall by second round KO at the SuperKombat World Grand Prix 2013 Final Elimination in Ploiești, Romania on 9 November 2013.

After two years off, Assi came back in great shape to the Krush to be qualified for the K1 Tournament. He won his fight by KO in the 2nd round.

== Titles ==
- 2015 Venum Victory World Series -95 kg Elimination Tournament Runner-up
- 2015 K-1 Event Grand Prix 2015 Tournament Runner-up -96 kg
- 2013 Troyes Trophy Heavyweight - 8 Men Tournament runner up
- 2012 Profight Karate Tournament Runner-up
- 2011 Profight Tournament Karate Champion
- 2008 French Kickboxing Champion
- 2008 DDS Kickboxing Tournament Champion
- 2007 Europe Kickboxing Champion

== Kickboxing record (incomplete) ==
46-21-1
Date	Result	Opponent	Event	Location	Method	Round	Time
2017-11-23	Loss	(Japan) Makoto Uehara	K-1 World GP 2017 Heavyweight Championship Tournament, Quarter Finals	Saitama, Japan	KO (left uppercut)	1	2:40
2017-08-06	Win	(Japan) Yuki Kudo	Krush 78	Tokyo, Japan	KO	2	
2015-11-28	Loss	(Moldova) Pavel Voronin	Venum Victory World Series 2015	Paris, France	Decision	3	3:00
2015-05-30	Loss	(Belarus) Igor Bugaenko	Obračun u Ringu 13, Final	Split, Croatia	TKO (retirement)	1	3:00
For the Venum Victory World Series -95 kg Elimination Tournament Title.
2015-05-30	Win	(Croatia) Toni Čatipović	Obračun u Ringu 13, Semi Finals	Split, Croatia	Ext. R. decision (unanimous)	4	3:00
2015-02-21	Loss	(Spain) Lorenzo Javier Jorge	K-1 Events 7, Final	Troyes, France	KO	1	
For K-1 Event Grand Prix 2015 Tournament Title -96 kg.
2015-02-21	Win	(Lithuania) Arnold Oborotov	K-1 Events 7, Semi Finals	Troyes, France	KO	1	
2014-06-27	Loss	(France) Correntin Jallon	Battle of Saint Raphael II	Saint Raphael, France	Decision	3	3:00
2014-05-31	Win	(England) Mylane Boycar	FK-ONE	Paris, France	KO	2	
2013-12-14	Loss	(Ukraine) Roman Kryklia	Victory	Paris, France	Decision	3	3:00
2013-10-11	Loss	(France) Nicolas Wamba	WARRIORS NIGHT 2	France	Decision	3	3:00
2013-06-15	Loss	(Ukraine) Roman Kryklia	Time Fight 3	Tours, France	TKO (cut)	1	0:30
For ISKA K1 Rules Super Cruiserweight World Title -95 kg.
2013-02-16	Loss	(Spain) Loren	K-1 EVENT 4, Final	Troyes, France	Decision (unanimous)	3	3:00
For Troyes Trophy Heavyweight - 8 Men Tournament title +91 kg.
2013-02-16	Win	(Belgium) Mathieu Kongolo	K-1 EVENT 4, Semi Finals	Troyes, France	Decision (split)	3	3:00
2013-02-16	Win	(Morocco) Nourdine Tamagroute	K-1 EVENT 4, Quarter Finals	Troyes, France	Decision (unanimous)	3	3:00
2012-06-30	Loss	(France) Zinedine Hameur-Lain	Pro Fight Karaté 4, Final	Levallois-Perret, France	Decision	3	3:00
For Profight Karate Tournament Cruiserweight Championship.
2012-06-30	Win	(Italy) Ivan Sidoti	Pro Fight Karaté 4, Semi Finals	Levallois-Perret, France			
2012-05-18	Draw	(Croatia) Florian Pavic	Stekos Fight Night	Munich, Germany	Decision draw	5	3:00
2011-11-26	Loss	(Belarus) Vitali Akhramenko	Fight Code: Rhinos Series Finals, Semi Finals	Geneva, Switzerland	Decision (unanimous)	3	3:00
2011-10-22	Win	(Czech Republic) Petr Vondráček	Fight Code: Rhinos Series Quarter Finals, Quarter Finals	Moscow, Russia	Decision (split)	3	3:00
2011-08-13	Win	(Italy) Luca Panto	Fight Code: Rhinos Series Final 16 (Part 3), First Round	Debrecen, Hungary	Extra round decision	4	3:00
2011-05-21	Loss	(Romania) Bogdan Stoica	SuperKombat World Grand Prix I 2011	Bucharest, Romania	TKO (corner stoppage)	3	
For WAKO Pro K1 Rules Intercontinental Heavyweight Championship -88 kg.
2011-04-09	Win	(France) Charpentier Matthias	Profight Karate Tournament 2, final	Paris, France	TKO (punch)	2	3:00
For Profight karate tournament Cruiserweight Championship.
2011-04-09	Win	(France) Demeautis Maxime	Profight Karate Tournament 2, Semi Finals	Paris, France	TKO (corner stoppage)	3	3:00
2011-03-05	Loss	(United Kingdom) Daniel Quigley		Derry, Northern Ireland	Decision	12	3:00
For ISKA Heavyweight World Championship.
2010–06-04	Loss	(Croatia) Agron Preteni	Nitrianska Noc Bojovnikov - Ring of Honor	Nitra, Slovakia	Decision	3	3:00
2008-11-22	Loss	(Latvia) Konstantin Gluhov	K-1 World Grand Prix 2008 in Riga, Quarter Finals	Riga, Latvia	KO (spinning back kick)	2	1:47
2008-06-28	Win	(France) Emmanuel Payet	Kick boxing tournament DDS, Final	St pierre, Reunion	TKO (corner stoppage)	2	0:38
For Kick boxing tournament DDS Championship.
2008-06-28	Win	(France) Josian Hoarau	Kick boxing tournament DDS, Semi Finals	St pierre, Reunion	KO (punch)	2	1:22
Legend: Win Loss Draw/no contest Notes
