= Abdarhmane Coulibaly =

French Muay Thai kickboxer

- Born: 29 September 1985 (age 41); Mézières-sur-Seine, France
- Height: 1.90 m (6 ft 3 in)
- Weight: 99 kg (218 lb; 15.6 st)
- Division: Heavyweight
- Style: Muay Thai, kickboxing
- Fighting out of: Mantes-la-Jolie, France
- Team: A.J.S.L.M. Boxing
- Trainer: Klébert Maillot

Kickboxing record
- Total: 94
- Wins: 65
- By knockout: 25
- Losses: 28
- Draws: 1

Abdarhmane Coulibaly (born 29 September 1985 in Mézières-sur-Seine) is a French Muay Thai kickboxer. He has competed for GLORY, SUPERKOMBAT Fighting Championship and Kunlun Fight.

== Personal life ==
His brother is the footballer Ousmane Coulibaly.

== Titles ==
=== Professional ===
- 2016 K-1 Event Grand Prix 2016 Tournament runner up
- 2015 VVWS Heavyweight World Champion
- 2013 WAKO PRO Low Kick Heavyweight World Champion +94,200 kg
- 2010 Fight For Peace Heavyweight Tournament Champion
- 2010 W.P.M.F. Muaythai European Champion -91 kg

=== Amateur ===
- 2013 WAKO world championship (gold) +91 kg (K-1 rules)
- 2008 I.F.M.A. World Muaythai Championships in Busan, South Korea (bronze)

== Fight record ==
Professional kickboxing record
65 wins (25 (T)KOs, 33 decisions), 28 losses, 1 draw
Date	Result	Opponent	Event	Location	Method	Round	Time
2025-07-12	Loss	(Albania) Françesko Xhaja	Senshi 27	Varna, Bulgaria	TKO (corner stop./low kicks)	2	1:05
2023-09-09	Loss	(Algeria) Nordine Mahieddine	Glory 88	Paris, France	KO (high kick)	3	2:19
2023-07-08	Loss	(Portugal) Bruno Susano	Senshi 17	Varna, Bulgaria	Decision (unanimous)	3	3:00
2019-02-23	Win	(Poland) Tomasz Sarara	DSF Kickboxing Challenge 20	Kraków, Poland	Decision (unanimous)	5	3:00
For the DSF Heavyweight (+91kg) Championship.
2017-12-02	Win	(Kazakhstan) Vladimir Toktasynov	Mix Fight Gala 23	Frankfurt, Germany	Decision (unanimous)	3	3:00
2017-10-28	Win	(Algeria) Florent Kaouachi	Glory 47: Lyon	Lyon, France	Decision (split)	3	3:00
2017-03-25	Loss	(Netherlands) Dexter Suisse	Victory 2017	Levallois, France	Decision	3	3:00
2017-02-18	Loss	(Russia) Turpal Tokaev	W5 Grand Prix Kitek XXXIX	Moscow, Russia	TKO (referee stoppage)	3	
2016-05-09	Loss	(France) Kevin Kieu	Partouche Kickboxing Tour, Semi-finals	Le Havre, France	KO (injury)	2	
2016-02-20	Loss	(Algeria) Nordine Mahieddine	K-1 Events 8, Final	Troyes, France	Decision	3	3:00
For The K-1 Event Grand Prix 2016 Tournament Title +100 kg.
2016-02-20	Win	(Belgium) Hacen Otman	K-1 Events 8, Semi-finals	Troyes, France	TKO (RTD)	2	
2015-11-28	Win	(France) Freddy Kemayo	Venum Victory World Series 2015	Paris, France	TKO (leg injury)	1	
Wins VVWS Heavyweight World Title.
2015-06-19	Loss	(Romania) Andrei Stoica	SUPERKOMBAT World Grand Prix III 2015	Constanța, Romania	Decision (unanimous)	3	3:00
2014-09-13	Loss	(Belarus) Andrey Gerasimchuk	Kunlun Fight 10, Semi-finals	Minsk, Belarus	Decision (unanimous)	3	3:00
2014-08-15	Loss	(Bosnia and Herzegovina) Dževad Poturak	No Limit 7	Zenica, Bosnia and Herzegovina	KO (right overhand)	2	
Lost WAKO PRO Low Kick Heavyweight World Title +94,200.
2013-12-14	Loss	(France) Freddy Kemayo	Victory	Paris, France	Decision	3	3:00
2013-11-23	Loss	(France) Stéphane Susperregui	La 20ème Nuit des Champions	Marseilles, France	Decision	3	3:00
For NDC K-1 rules light heavyweight -100 kg title.
2013-05-11	Draw	(Suriname) Redouan Cairo	THE GAME	Saint-Denis, La Réunion	Decision	3	3:00
2013-03-09	Win	(Russia) Ragim Aliev	Monte-Carlo Fighting Masters	Monte Carlo, Monaco	KO	2	
Wins WAKO PRO Low Kick Heavyweight World Title +94,200.
2012-11-09	Win	(Réunion) Fabrice Aurieng	Maxi Fight 4	Saint-Denis, Réunion	Decision	3	3:00
2012-05-12	Win	(Algeria) Zinedine Hameur-Lain	Wicked One Tournament	Paris, France	TKO	2	
2012-02-18	Win	(France) Tomboron Samake	HMT : le choc des villes	France	KO	2	
2011-11-06	Loss	(Australia) Nathan Corbett	Muaythai Premier League: Round 3	The Hague, Netherlands	Decision (unanimous)	3	3:00
2011-04-23	Win	(Algeria) Massinissa Hamaili	Le choc des ceintures	France	KO		
2011-04-02	Win	(France) David Radeff	Explosion Fight Night Volume 3	Brest, France	Decision (majority)	5	3:00
2010-11-19	Win	(Algeria) Zinedine Hameur-Lain	Fight For Peace, Final	France	TKO	2	
Wins Fight For Peace Heavyweight Tournament Championship.
2010-11-19	Win	(France) Hichem Abdellal	Fight For Peace, Semi-finals	France	Decision	3	3:00
2010-10-29	Win	(Armenia) Sahak Parparyan	France vs. Lumpinee	Paris, France	Decision	5	3:00
Wins W.P.M.F. Muaythai European Title -91 kg.
2010-10-15	Loss	(Turkey) Yuksel Ayaydin	Maxi Fight 2	Saint-Denis, Réunion	Decision (unanimous)	3	3:00
2010-05-08	Win	(Portugal) Ricardo Cabral	La nuit des défis	France	Decision	3	3:00
2010-02-26	Win	(Thailand) Wehaj Kingboxing	Lumpini Kerkkrai: VILLAUME vs SAIYOKE	Bangkok, Thailand	Decision (unanimous)	3	3:00
2009-12-04	Win		King's Birthday	Bangkok, Thailand	KO	2	
2008-12-06	Win	(France) Steve Zaidi	Les chocs de Légendes II	France	Decision (unanimous)	3	3:00
2008-04-19	Win	(France) Hichem Medoukali	Finales championnat National France 2008	France	KO	1	
Wins FMDA Muay Thaï National Title -81 kg.
2007-11-09	Win	(France) Emmanuel Payet	Nuit des défis	France	KO	2	
2007-07-14	Loss	(Germany) Serdar Karaca	Franthaifull France VS Rayong Sports Germany	Heidenheim, Germany	Decision	3	3:00

Amateur kickboxing record
Date	Result	Opponent	Event	Location	Method	Round	Time
2025-08-14	Loss	(Uzbekistan) Khusankhon Baratov	2025 World Games, Bronze Medal Fight	Chengdu, China	Decision (3:0)	3	2:00
2025-08-13	Loss	(Ukraine) Roman Shcherbatiuk	2025 World Games, Semifinals	Chengdu, China	Decision (3:0)	3	2:00
2025-08-12	Win	(China) Haifeng Shi	2025 World Games, Quarterfinals	Chengdu, China	Decision (3:0)	3	2:00
2024-11-07	Loss	(Turkey) Emin Özer	2024 WAKO European Championships, Semifinals	Athens, Greece	Decision (2:1)	3	2:00
2024-11-05	Win	(Poland) Robert Dochod	2024 WAKO European Championships, Quarterfinals	Athens, Greece	Decision (2:1)	3	2:00
2024-11-04	Win	(Netherlands) Dylan Westerhuis	2024 WAKO European Championships, First Round	Athens, Greece	Decision (3:0)	3	2:00
2013-10	Win	(Belarus) Alexei Kudin	W.A.K.O World Championships 2013, K-1 Final +91 kg	Guaruja, Brasil			
Wins W.A.K.O. World Championship '13 K-1 Gold Medal +91 kg.
2013-10	Win	(Bulgaria) Kostadin Kostov	W.A.K.O World Championships 2013, K-1 Semi-finals +91 kg	Guaruja, Brasil			
2013-10	Win	(Italy) Alex Rossi	W.A.K.O World Championships 2013, K-1 Quarter-finals +91 kg	Guaruja, Brasil			
2013-10	Win	(South Africa) Sors Grobbelaar	W.A.K.O World Championships 2013, K-1 1st Round +91 kg	Guaruja, Brasil			
Legend: Win Loss Draw/no contest Notes

== See also ==
- List of male kickboxers
