= Roman Kryklia =

Ukrainian heavyweight kickboxer (born 1991)

- Born: 11 October 1991 (age 35); Krasnohrad, Kharkiv Oblast, Ukraine (now Krasnohrad, Kharkiv Oblast, Ukraine)
- Native name: Роман Олегович Крикля
- Height: 2.00 m (6 ft 6 1/2 in)
- Weight: 105.8 kg (233 lb; 16.66 st)
- Division: Heavyweight; Super Heavyweight; Light Heavyweight
- Reach: 83 1/2 in (212 cm)
- Style: Kickboxing, Muay Thai, boxing
- Stance: Orthodox
- Fighting out of: Dubai, UAE
- Team: Gridin Gym
- Trainer: Andrei Gridin
- Years active: 2012–present

Kickboxing record
- Total: 61
- Wins: 52
- By knockout: 30
- Losses: 8
- By knockout: 0
- No contests: 1

Roman Olegovich Kryklia (Ukrainian: Роман Олегович Крикля; born October 11, 1991) is a Ukrainian heavyweight kickboxer and Muay Thai practitioner currently competing in the Light Heavyweight and Heavyweight divisions of ONE Championship, where he is the inaugural and current ONE Light Heavyweight Kickboxing World Champion, the inaugural and current ONE Heavyweight Muay Thai World Champion, and the current ONE Heavyweight Kickboxing World Champion.

Roman Kryklia is currently ranked the number 1 heavyweight in the world in Muay Thai according to combat press.

== Early life ==
Roman Kryklia was born in the city of Krasnohrad, Kharkiv Oblast in a nearly-dissolve Ukrainian SSR. At six years old he began training at the sports club "Burovik." His coach at the time was Valentin Nikolaevich Kozhushko. With the club "Burovik", Kryklia began to fight at the Ukrainian Kenpokai Karate and Kickboxing championships, among children and youth, and won a number of medals.

In 2008 in the city of Lutsk, he became the youth champion of Ukraine in kickboxing and received the title of Master of Sports in Kickboxing. In 2008, he began to train in the city of Kharkiv, at the club "Maximus," with coach Maxim Nikolaevich Kiyko and the famous Kharkiv boxing trainer Victor Nikolaevich Demchenko.

During his studies at the Kharkiv National Automobile and Highway University, he defended the honor of the University at the Kickboxing Championship of Ukraine among students for four years (2012–2015 years), and he ranked first. He was the silver Thai Boxing champion of Ukraine among amateurs in the city of Odesa (2010).

== Kickboxing career ==
=== Early career ===
In October 2012, Kryklia made his professional debut against Tomáš Možný at Nitrianska noc bojovníkov 2012. He won the fight by decision. Kryklia would go on to amass a 4–3 record, winning four of his next seven fights. In January 2015, he participated in the Yangame's Fight Night 2 light heavyweight tournament. He won both the semifinal bout against Jiří Stariat and the final bout against Radovan Kulla by decision.

After his first tournament title win, Krylia won three of his next four fights, including notable victories over Igor Mihaljević and Sergej Maslobojev. He then took part in the 2015 Tatneft Cup heavyweight tournament, scoring knockouts of Claudiu Istrate in the semifinals and Daniel Lentie in the finals.

=== SUPERKOMBAT Fighting Championship ===
Two months later, Krylia would sign with the biggest kickboxing promotion in Europe to participate in their SUPERKOMBAT Heavyweight Grand Prix. He won a unanimous decision against Ivan Pavle in the semifinals, but lost to Tarik Khbabez by decision in the finals.

After losing to Khabez, Kryklia went on a thirteen fight winning streak, which began with decision wins against Konstantin Gluhov and Jahfarr Wilnis. In June 2016, he won the A1 WGP qualification tournament by knocking out Thomas Vanneste in the semifinals, and by forcing Daniel Lentie to withdraw at the end of the first round in the final. In the semifinals of the A1 Grand Prix itself, Kryklia faced Daniel Lentie for the third time in his career, and won for the third time as well, beating Lentie by decision. He won the tournament with a first-round TKO of Arnold Oborotov.

Kryklia vs. Kwasi in K-1

=== K-1 ===
Just two weeks later, Kryklia entered the 2016 K-1 Europe heavyweight tournament. Kryklia won the quarterfinals against Bosnian Bahrudin Mahmić, semifinals against Atha Kasapis and finals against Fabio Kwasi in the same manner - knocking all three with a knee strike. For his last fight of 2016, Kryklia was scheduled to fight Stéphane Susperregui at Nuit des Champions 2016. He won the fight by majority decision.

=== Kunlun Fight ===
During Monte Carlo Fighting Masters, Kryklia fought Fabrice Aurieng for both the Prince Albert's Cup and the Monte Carlo FM heavyweight title. He won the fight by TKO, after Aurieng's corner threw in the towel in the second round.

In December 2017, Kryklia fought in the Kunlun Fight heavyweight tournament, held at the KLF 68 event. He won the quarterfinal bout against Ning Tianshuai by a first-round TKO and the semifinal bout against Felipe Micheletti by unanimous decision. He lost the final fight against Iraj Azizpour by an extra round decision, despite coming into the fight as a favorite.

Kryklia fought Yuksel Ayaydin at MFC 7, in Ayaydin's retirement fight, winning the fight by decision. He afterwards fought Daniel Svkor for the WAKO World heavyweight tile, winning by a second-round knockout.

In the semifinals of the 2018 FEA World Grand Prix, Kryklia was scheduled to fight a rubber match with Tomáš Hron, with each fighter holding a win over the other. He won the fight by unanimous decision, and went on to face Tsotne Rogava in the final. The fight with Rogava went into an extra round, after which Kryklia won a decision.

At Kunlun Fight 80, Kryklia once again fought in the KLF heavyweight tournament. He defeated Martin Pacas by unanimous decision in the quarterfinal, and Rade Opacic by a second-round TKO in the semifinal, before fighting a rematch with Iraj Azizpour in the finals. Kryklia was more successful in their second fight, winning a unanimous decision.

=== ONE Championship ===
==== ONE Kickboxing Light Heavyweight Champion ====
On November 16, 2019, Roman Kryklia defeated Tarik Khbabez by TKO to become the inaugural ONE Light Heavyweight Kickboxing World Champion.

Kryklia was expected to defend his belt against Andrei Stoica at ONE Infinity 1, but the light heavyweight title fight postponed due to coronavirus. Kryklia was rescheduled to defend the ONE Light Heavyweight Kickboxing World Championship against Murat Aygün at ONE Championship: Big Bang on December 4, 2020. The fight with Aygun fell through, as one of Kryklia's corner-men tested positive for COVID-19.

Accordingly, Aygun received a new opponent, while Kryklia was scheduled to fight Andrei Stoica, who took the fight on short notice being announced only a few days before the match, at ONE Championship: Collision Course. At the official weigh in, Kryklia weighed more than Stoica. Eventually, the fight was won by Kryklia by unanimous decision, who was in control during the match.

Kryklia was scheduled to make his second ONE Kickboxing Light Heavyweight title defense against Murat Aygün at ONE Championship: NextGen on October 29, 2021. However, Aygün was pulled from the fight and Kryklia was instead scheduled to face Iraj Azizpour for the inaugural ONE Kickboxing Heavyweight World Championship. However, due to an undisclosed medical issue, Kryklia withdrew from the fight.

Kryklia was rebooked against Murat Aygün for January 14, 2022 at ONE: Heavy Hitters. The fight was later postponed for ONE: Full Circle on February 25, 2022. Kryklia defeated Aygün via first-round knockout.

==== ONE Kickboxing Heavyweight Grand Prix ====
Kryklia faced Guto Inocente in the semifinals of the ONE Heavyweight Kickboxing World Grand Prix Tournament at ONE 161 on September 29, 2022. He won the fight by a first-round knockout. Kryklia knocked Inocente down twice before the one-minute mark of the opening round, which prompted the referee to wave the fight off.

In September 2022, Combat Press ranked him as the #3 heavyweight kickboxer in the world, while Beyond Kickboxing ranks him at #4 as of October 2022.

Kryklia was booked to face Iraj Azizpour in a trilogy bout in the finals of the ONE Heavyweight Kickboxing World Grand Prix Tournament at ONE 163 on November 18, 2022. He won the fight by a second-round knockout, after having been dropped by Azizpour in the opening frame.

==== Continued title reign ====
Kryklia was expected to make his third ONE Light Heavyweight Kickboxing World Championship defense against Françesko Xhaja at ONE Fight Night 12 on July 14, 2023. The title bout was postponed due to an undisclosed injury on June 30.

==== Double champion ====
Kryklia faced Alex Roberts for the inaugural ONE Heavyweight Muay Thai World Championship at ONE Fight Night 17 on December 9, 2023. He won the fight by a second-round knockout.

In the first heavyweight Muay Thai title defense, Kryklia faced Lyndon Knowles on April 5, 2025, at ONE Fight Night 30. He won the fight via knockout in round one and earned a $50,000 Performance of the Night bonus.

Kryklia faced Samet Agdeve for the inaugural ONE Heavyweight Kickboxing World Championship on November 7, 2025, at ONE Fight Night 37. He lost the fight via unanimous decision.

== Doping suspension ==
On April 18, 2018, it was announced that Kryklia failed a drug test prior to Nuit des Champions 2016, testing positive for two banned substances, including meldonium and clenbuterol. He was suspended for four years by National Anti-Doping Agency of France (AFLD) from the participation in all sports events organized or authorized by French sports federations until 7 May 2022. As a result, his majority decision win against Stéphane Susperregui was changed to a no contest.

== Titles and accomplishments ==
- ONE Championship
  - 2019 ONE Light Heavyweight Kickboxing World Championship (one time, current)
    - Two successful title defenses
  - 2022 ONE Heavyweight Kickboxing World Grand Prix Tournament winner
  - 2023 ONE Heavyweight Muay Thai World Championship (one time, current)
    - One successful title defense
  - 2026 ONE Heavyweight Kickboxing World Championship (one time, current)
  - Performance of the Night (five times) vs. Murat Aygün, Guto Inocente, Iraj Azizpour, Alex Roberts and Lyndon Knowles
  - 2022 Kickboxing Fighter of the Year
  - 2022 Kickboxing Knockout of the Year vs. Iraj Azizpour
  - 2022 Kickboxing Fight of the Year vs. Iraj Azizpour at ONE 163
- Kunlun Fight
  - 2019 Kunlun Fight Super Heavyweight Tournament Champion
- Fighting Entertainment Association
  - 2018 FEA World Grand Prix Tournament Champion
- World Association of Kickboxing Organizations
  - 2018 WAKO Pro K-1 World Super Heavyweight (+94.1 kg) Champion
- Monte Carlo Fighting Masters
  - 2017 Monte Carlo Fighting Masters Heavyweight Champion +94.2 kg.
  - 2017 H.S.H. Prince Albert II of Monaco's Cup +94.2 kg.
- Combat Press
  - 2016 Combat Press Fighter of the Year nomination
- K-1
  - 2016 K-1 World GP Euro -95kg Tournament Winner
- A1
  - 2016 A1 WGP Final Heavyweight Tournament Champion
  - 2016 A1 WGP Part 3 Heavyweight Tournament Champion
- SUPERKOMBAT Fighting Championship
  - 2015 SUPERKOMBAT World Grand Prix 2015 Final Tournament runner-up
- Tatneft Cup
  - 2015 Tatneft Cup 2015 +91 kg/200 lb Champion
- Yangame's Fight Night
  - 2015 Yangame's Fight Night 2: TATNEFT TNA Collizion +80 kg/176 lb Champion

== Fight record ==
Professional kickboxing record
52 wins (30 (T)KOs), 8 losses, 0 draws, 1 no contest

Date	Result	Opponent	Event	Location	Method	Round	Time
2026-06-19	Win	(Turkey) Samet Agdeve	ONE Friday Fights 159	Bangkok, Thailand	Decision (unanimous)	5	3:00
Wins the ONE Heavyweight Kickboxing World Championship.
2025-11-07	Loss	(Turkey) Samet Agdeve	ONE Fight Night 37	Bangkok, Thailand	Decision (unanimous)	5	3:00
For the inaugural ONE Heavyweight Kickboxing World Championship.
2025-04-05	Win	(England) Lyndon Knowles	ONE Fight Night 30	Bangkok, Thailand	KO (right cross)	1	2:10
Defends the ONE Heavyweight Muay Thai World Championship.
2023-12-09	Win	(Australia) Alex Roberts	ONE Fight Night 17	Bangkok, Thailand	KO (left hook)	2	0:25
Wins the inaugural ONE Heavyweight Muay Thai World Championship.
2022-11-19	Win	(Iran) Iraj Azizpour	ONE 163, Tournament Final	Kallang, Singapore	TKO (punches)	2	1:28
Won the ONE Heavyweight Kickboxing World Grand Prix title.
2022-09-29	Win	(Brazil) Guto Inocente	ONE 161, Tournament Semifinal	Kallang, Singapore	TKO (head kick)	1	0:52
2022-02-25	Win	(Turkey) Murat Aygun	ONE: Full Circle	Kallang, Singapore	KO (kick to the body + punches)	1	2:32
Defended the ONE Light Heavyweight Kickboxing World Championship.
2020-12-18	Win	(Romania) Andrei Stoica	ONE Championship: Collision Course	Kallang, Singapore	Decision (unanimous)	5	3:00
Defended the ONE Light Heavyweight Kickboxing World Championship.
2019-11-16	Win	(Morocco) Tarik Khbabez	ONE Championship: Age Of Dragons	Beijing, China	TKO (3 knockdown rule)	2	0:43
Won the inaugural ONE Light Heavyweight Kickboxing World Championship.
2019-02-24	Win	(Iran) Iraj Azizpour	Kunlun Fight 80 - Heavyweight Tournament, Final	Shanghai, China	Decision (unanimous)	3	3:00
Wins Kunlun Fight Super Heavyweight Tournament.
2019-02-24	Win	(Serbia) Rade Opačić	Kunlun Fight 80 - Heavyweight Tournament, Semi Finals	Shanghai, China	TKO (5 knockdowns/punches)	2	1:11
2019-02-24	Win	(Slovakia) Martin Pacas	Kunlun Fight 80 - Heavyweight Tournament, Quarter Finals	Shanghai, China	Decision (unanimous)	3	3:00
2018-12-07	Win	(Netherlands) Sam Tevette	Tatneft Cup 2018 Final	Kazan, Russia	Ext.R decision	4	3:00
2018-10-06	Win	(Ukraine) Tsotne Rogava	FEA World Grand Prix, Final	Moldova	Ext.R decision (unanimous)	4	3:00
Wins FEA World Grand Prix Tournament.
2018-10-06	Win	(Czech Republic) Tomáš Hron	FEA World Grand Prix, Semi Finals	Moldova	Decision (unanimous)	3	3:00
2018-06-30	Win	(Czech Republic) Daniel Škvor	Monte-Carlo Fighting Trophy	Monaco	KO (right cross)	2	
Wins WAKO Pro K-1 World Super Heavyweight (+94.1kg) title.
2018-05-03	Win	(Turkey) Yuksel Ayaydin	MFC 7	France	Decision	3	3:00
2018-02-04	Loss	(Iran) Iraj Azizpour	Kunlun Fight 69 Heavyweight Tournament, Final	China	Ex. R decision (majority)	4	3:00
For Kunlun Fight 2018 +100kg Tournament Championship.
2018-02-04	Win	(Brazil) Felipe Micheletti	Kunlun Fight 69 Heavyweight Tournament, Semi Finals	China	Decision (unanimous)	3	3:00
2017-12-17	Win	(China) Ning Tianshuai	Kunlun Fight 68 Heavyweight Tournament, Quarter Finals	China	TKO (doctor stoppage/cut)	1	
2017-11-25	Win	(France) Nordine Mahieddine	Nuit Des Champions	Marseille, France	Decision (unanimous)	3	3:00
2017-07-27	Loss	(Czech Republic) Tomáš Hron	Yangames Fight Night 2017	Prague, Czech Republic	Decision	3	3:00
2017-06-30	Win	(France) Fabrice Aurieng	Monte Carlo Fighting Masters	Monte Carlo, Monaco	TKO (towel thrown)	2	
Wins H.S.H. Prince Albert II of Monaco's Cup +94.2 kg. and Monte Carlo Fighting Masters Heavyweight Championship.
2016-11-19	NC	(France) Stéphane Susperregui	Nuit des Champions 2016	Marseille, France	No contest	3	3:00
Originally a MD win for Kryklia, later ruled a NC after Kryklia failed a drug test.
2016-10-27	Win	(Netherlands) Fabio Kwasi	K-1 World GP 2016 -95kg Championship Tournament	Belgrade, Serbia	KO (knee)	2	
Wins K-1 World GP 2016 -95kg Championship Tournament.
2016-10-27	Win	(Germany) Atha Kasapis	K-1 World GP 2016 -95kg Championship Tournament	Belgrade, Serbia	KO (knee)	3	
2016-10-27	Win	(Bosnia and Herzegovina) Bahrudin Mahmić	K-1 World GP 2016 -95kg Championship Tournament	Belgrade, Serbia	KO (knee)	1	
2016-10-13	Win	(Lithuania) Arnold Oborotov	Partouche Kickboxing Tour 2016 - Final	France	TKO (left hook and knee)	1	
Wins A1 WGP Final Heavyweight Tournament.
2016-10-13	Win	(Cameroon) Daniel Lentie	Partouche Kickboxing Tour 2016 - Final	France	Decision	3	3:00
2016-06-10	Win	(Cameroon) Daniel Lentie	Partouche Kickboxing Tour, Final	Toulon, France	Abandon	1	
Wins A1 WGP Part 3 Heavyweight Tournament.
2016-06-10	Win	(Belgium) Thomas Vanneste	Partouche Kickboxing Tour, Semi Finals	Toulon, France	TKO (corner stoppage)	2	
2016-01-09	Win	(Netherlands) Jahfarr Wilnis	Kunlun Fight 36	Shanghai, China	Decision (unanimous)	3	3:00
2015-12-26	Win	(Latvia) Konstantin Gluhov	Akhmat Fight Show	Grozny, Russia	Decision (unanimous)	3	3:00
2015-11-07	Loss	(Morocco) Tarik Khbabez	SUPERKOMBAT World Grand Prix 2015, Final	Bucharest, Romania	Decision (unanimous)	3	3:00
For SUPERKOMBAT World Grand Prix 2015 Final +96 kg/211 lb Tournament Championship.
2015-11-07	Win	(Slovakia) Ivan Pavle	SUPERKOMBAT World Grand Prix 2015, Semi Finals	Bucharest, Romania	Decision (unanimous)	3	3:00
2015-09-04	Win	(Cameroon) Daniel Lentie	Tatneft Cup 2015 Final	Kazan, Russia	KO (knee to the head)	1	0:47
Wins Tatneft Cup 2015 +91 kg/200 lb Championship.
2015-08-04	Win	(Italy) Claudio Istrate	Tatneft Cup 2015 Semifinal	Kazan, Russia	TKO (3 knockdowns)	1	1:57
2015-06-07	Win	(Lithuania) Sergej Maslobojev	Kunlun Fight 26 - Super Heavyweight Tournament, Reserve Fight	Chongqing, China	KO (left hook)	3	
2015-04-29	Win	(Croatia) Igor Mihaljević	Tatneft Cup 2015 - 1st selection 1/4 final	Kazan, Russia	KO (knee to the head)	2	
2015-03-17	Loss	(Netherlands) Jahfarr Wilnis	Kunlun Fight 21 - Super Heavyweight Tournament, Quarter Finals	Sanya, China	Ext. R. decision	4	3:00
2015-02-21	Win	(Netherlands) Dexter Suisse	Tatneft Cup 2015 - 3rd selection 1/8 final	Kazan, Russia	TKO (left hook)	1	1:30
2015-01-17	Win	(Slovakia) Radovan Kulla	Yangame's Fight Night 2: TATNEFT TNA Collizion, Final	Prague, Czech Republic	Decision	3	3:00
Wins Yangame's Fight Night 2: TATNEFT TNA Collizion +80 kg/176 lb Championship.
2015-01-17	Win	(Czech Republic) Jiří Stariat	Yangame's Fight Night 2: TATNEFT TNA Collizion, Semi Finals	Prague, Czech Republic	Decision	3	3:00
2015-01-03	Win	(Czech Republic) Tomáš Hron	Kunlun Fight 15 - Super Heavyweight Tournament, Final 16	Nanjing, China	КО (high kick)	1	
2014-01-31	Loss	(Belgium) Kirk Krouba	Tatneft Cup 2014 – 2nd selection 1/8 final	Kazan, Russia	Decision (unanimous)	3	3:00
2013-12-14	Win	(France) Pacôme Assi	Victory	Paris, France	Decision	3	3:00
2013-09-14	Loss	(Slovakia) Martin Pacas	Muay Thai Evening 3	Trenčín, Slovakia	Decision	3	3:00
2013-06-15	Win	(France) Pacôme Assi	Time Fight 3	Tours, France	TKO (cut)	1	
2013-02-22	Win	(Belarus) Yuri Dobko	Muaythai Night	Moscow, Russia	TKO (injury)	3	
2012-11-18	Loss	(Belarus) Valentin Slavikovski	Knockout-Show Mustang	Minsk, Belarus	Decision	3	3:00
2012-10-27	Win	(Slovakia) Tomáš Možný	Nitrianska noc bojovníkov 2012	Prague, Czech Republic	Decision	3	3:00

Legend: Win Loss Draw/no contest Notes

== See also ==
- List of male kickboxers
- List of ONE Championship champions
