= Murat Aygün =

Turkish-Dutch kickboxer (born 1988)

- Born: December 13, 1988 (age 37); Enschede, Netherlands
- Other names: The Butcher
- Height: 185 cm (6 ft 1 in)
- Weight: 122 kg (269 lb; 19.2 st)
- Division: Heavyweight; Light Heavyweight
- Reach: 72.4 in (184 cm)
- Style: Kickboxing
- Fighting out of: Enschede, Netherlands
- Team: SB Gym
- Years active: 2014 – present

Kickboxing record
- Total: 23
- Wins: 17
- By knockout: 8
- Losses: 5
- By knockout: 4
- Draws: 0
- No contests: 1

Other information
- Notable relatives: Cem Caceres (cousin)

Murat Aygün (born 13 December 1988) is a Turkish-Dutch kickboxer, currently competing in the heavyweight division of Glory.

As of February 2022, he is the #6 ranked heavyweight according to Combat Press. Combat Press has ranked him in the heavyweight top ten since March 2019.

== Kickboxing career ==
=== Early career ===
Aygün made his professional debut against Raoumaru at Rise 100 – Blade 0 on July 12, 2014. He scored an early knockdown with a combination of a left hook and right straight, which elicited a standing down call from the referee. Aygün ended the fight, after the action resumed, with a right hook.

Aygün was scheduled to face Nobu Hayashi at the inaugural BLADE event on December 29, 2014. He won the fight by a second-round technical knockout.

Aygün was scheduled to face Atha Kasapis at Champions Night on April 23, 2016. He won the fight by a third-round technical knockout, as the ringside doctor stopped the fight with 5 seconds left in the round. The two of them were scheduled to fight an immediate rematch for the ISKA Oriental Rules World Super Heavyweight title at K-1 Germany GP on May 21, 2016. He won the fight by decision.

==== SUPERKOMBAT ====
Peter Aerts's Aygün was expected to make his SUPERKOMBAT promotional debut against Cătălin Moroșanu in the main event of Superkombat World Grand Prix in Mamaia on July 30, 2016. However, it was reported Moroșanu was pulled out from the event due to undisclosed reason and he was replaced by short-notice replacement Sebastian Cozmâncă. Aygün won the fight by decision, after an extension round was fought.

Prince Ali was scheduled to fight Prince Ali for the HEAT Kick Heavyweight title at HEAT 38 on September 25, 2016. He won the fight by a third-round technical knockout.

Aygün was scheduled to fight Tarik Khbabez for the MIX Fight Gala Heavyweight title at Mix Fight Gala 20 on December 3, 2016. He won his third career title fight by decision, after an extra round was fought.

==== Dutch circuit ====
Aygün was scheduled to face the 2008 K-1 Grand Prix winner Errol Zimmerman for the WFL Heavyweight title at WFL – Champion vs. Champion on April 23, 2017. Although he was successful in the first round, Zimmerman managed to knock Aygün down with a left hook in the second round. Aygün recovered in between the rounds and won the fight by unanimous decision, winning the first and third rounds on the judges' scorecards.

Aygün was scheduled to face Henriques Zowa in a non-title bout at WFL: Manhoef vs. Bonjasky, Final 16 on October 29, 2017. He won the fight by decision.

Aygün participated in a one-night World Fighting League tournament, held on September 22, 2018. He was scheduled to face Fabio Kwasi in the quarterfinals. He won the fight by unanimous decision, and beat Sam Tevette in the same manner in the semifinals. Aygün won the tournament with a decision win against Nordine Mahieddine in the finals. He earned a reported €100 000 for winning the tournament.

Aygün was scheduled to face James McSweeney in the semifinals of the Mix Fight heavyweight tournament, held at Mix Fight 27 on December 7, 2019. McSweeney won the fight by a second-round technical knockout, after the ringside doctor stopped the bout due to a cut on Aygün's face.

Aygün was scheduled to fight Levi Rigters for the Enfusion Super Heavyweight title at Enfusion 95 on February 29, 2020, but the fight fell through due to a disagreement between Rigters and Enfusion co-promoter Ringfight Promotions. Aygün was instead scheduled to fight Mohamed El Bouchaibi. El Bouchaibi by decision.

=== ONE Championship ===
On June 1, 2020 it was revealed that Aygün had signed with ONE Championship. He was scheduled to fight Roman Kryklia for the ONE Kickboxing Light Heavyweight Championship during ONE Championship: Big Bang. The fight was later cancelled, as one of Kryklia's coaches tested positive for COVID-19. Aygun was rescheduled to fight Anderson Silva. Aygun went on to defeat Silva by unanimous decision.

Aygün was scheduled to challenge the reigning ONE Kickboxing Light Heavyweight champion Roman Kryklia at ONE Championship: NextGen on October 29, 2021. Aygün later withdrew from the bout, for undisclosed reasons. Aygün was rebooked against Roman Kryklia for January 14, 2022 at ONE: Heavy Hitters. The fight was later postponed for ONE: Full Circle on February 25, 2022. Aygün lost the fight via first-round knockout.

=== Glory ===
Aygün was expected to Nikola Filipović in a heavyweight tournament reserve bout at Glory 85 on April 29, 2023. He was moved up into the tournament proper, after Luis Tavares withdrew, and faced Enver Šljivar in the semifinals. Although Aygün was able to overcome Šljivar by unanimous decision, he lost the final bout against Kevin Tariq Osaro by TKO. His win over Šljivar was changed to a no contest after both fighters failed a post-match drug test. As a result, he received 1-year suspension.

Aygün faced Ionuț Iancu at Glory Light Heavyweight Grand Prix on June 8, 2024. He lost the fight by a second-round knockout.

He takes part in the Glory 99 “Heavyweight Last Man Standing Tournament” where 32 heavyweight fighters compete on April 5, 2025 in Rotterdam, Netherlands.

== Titles and accomplishments ==
- Mix Fighting Championship
  - 2016 Mix Fight Gala Heavyweight Champion
- International Sport Karate Association
  - 2016 ISKA Oriental Rules World Super Heavyweight Champion
- HEAT
  - 2016 HEAT Kick Heavyweight Champion
- World Fighting League
  - 2017 World Fighting League Heavyweight Champion
  - 2018 World Fighting League Tournament Heavyweight Champion
- Glory
  - 2023 Glory Four-Man Heavyweight Tournament Runner-up

== Professional kickboxing record ==
Professional kickboxing record
17 wins (4 (T)KOs), 5 losses, 0 draws, 1 NC
Date	Result	Opponent	Event	Location	Method	Round	Time	Record
2025-04-05	Loss	(Russia) Asadulla Nasipov	Glory 99 - Last Heavyweight Standing, Opening Round	Rotterdam, Netherlands	Decision (unanimous)	3	3:00	17–5
2024-06-08	Loss	(Romania) Ionuț Iancu	Glory Light Heavyweight Grand Prix	Rotterdam, Netherlands	KO (left hook)	2	1:43	17–4
2023-04-29	Loss	(Nigeria) Tariq Osaro	Glory 85, Tournament Final	Rotterdam, Netherlands	TKO (punches)	3	3:00	17–3
2023-04-29	NC	(Bosnia and Herzegovina) Enver Sljivar	Glory 85, Tournament Semi Final	Rotterdam, Netherlands	No contest	1	3:00	17–2
Originally a TKO win for Aygün, changed to a no contest after he tested positive for a banned substance.
2022-02-25	Loss	(Ukraine) Roman Kryklia	ONE: Full Circle	Kallang, Singapore	KO (kick to the body + punches)	1	2:32	17–2
For the ONE Kickboxing Light Heavyweight Championship.
2020-12-04	Win	(Brazil) Anderson Silva	ONE Championship: Big Bang	Kallang, Singapore	Decision (unanimous)	3	3:00	17–1
2020-02-29	Win	(Belgium) Mohamed El Bouchaibi	Enfusion 95	Eindhoven, Netherlands	Decision (unanimous)	3	3:00	16–1
2019-12-07	Loss	(United Kingdom) James McSweeney	Mix Fight 27 Heavyweight Tournament, Semi Final	Frankfurt, Germany	TKO (doctor stoppage/cut)	2		15–1
2018-09-22	Win	(France) Nordine Mahieddine	WFL: Final 8, Final	Almere, Netherlands	Decision	3	3:00	15–0
Wins the WFL Tournament Heavyweight title.
2018-09-22	Win	(Senegal) Sam Tevette	WFL: Final 8, Semi Finals	Almere, Netherlands	Decision	3	3:00	14–0
2018-09-22	Win	(Netherlands) Fabio Kwasi	WFL: Final 8, Quarter Finals	Almere, Netherlands	Decision	3	3:00	13–0
2017-10-29	Win	(Angola) Henriques Zowa	WFL: Manhoef vs. Bonjasky, Final 16	Almere, Netherlands	Decision	3	3:00	12–0
2017-04-23	Win	(Netherlands) Errol Zimmerman	WFL – Champion vs. Champion	Almere, Netherlands	Decision	5	3:00	11–0
Wins the WFL Heavyweight title.
2016-12-03	Win	(Morocco) Tarik Khbabez	Mix Fight Gala 20	Frankfurt, Germany	Extra round decision	4	3:00	10–0
Wins the MIX Fight Gala Heavyweight title.
2016-09-25	Win	(Iran) Prince Ali	HEAT 38	Nagoya, Japan	TKO (referee stoppage)	3	2:03	9–0
Wins the HEAT Kick Heavyweight title.
2016-07-30	Win	(Romania) Sebastian Cozmâncă	Superkombat World Grand Prix: Moroșanu vs. Aygün	Constanța, Romania	Extra round decision	4	3:00	8–0
2016-05-21	Win	(Greece) Atha Kasapis	K-1 Germany GP	Stuttgart, Germany	Decision	3	2:55	7–0
Wins the ISKA World Heavyweight title.
2016-04-23	Win	(Greece) Atha Kasapis	Champions Night	Istanbul, Turkey	TKO (doctor stoppage)	3	2:55	6–0
2015-11-21	Win	(Latvia) Konstantin Gluhov	Kunlun Fight 34	Shenzhen, China	Decision	3	3:00	5–0
2014-12-29	Win	(Japan) Nobu Hayashi	Blade 1	Japan	TKO (punches)	2	0:46	3–0
2014-07-12	Win	(Japan) Raoumaru	Rise 100 – Blade 0	Japan	KO (right hook)	1	1:42	2-0
2009-12-23	Win	(Suriname) Jairzinho Rozenstruik	N/A	Paramaribo, Suriname	Decision	3	3:00	1-0
Legend: Win Loss Draw/no contest Notes

== See also ==
- List of male kickboxers
