= 2016 in Glory =

Kickboxing events

Information
- First date: February 26
- Last date: December 10

Events
- Total events: 10

Fights

Chronology
2015 in Glory	2016 in Glory	2017 in Glory

The year 2016 was the 5th year in the history of Glory, an international kickboxing event. 2016 saw the promotion introduce its Women's Super Bantamweight division. The events were broadcast through television agreements with ESPN and other regional channels around the world.

== List of events ==
#	Event title	Date	Arena	Location
1	Glory 27: Chicago	February 26, 2016	Sears Centre	(United States) Hoffman Estates, Illinois, USA
2	Glory 28: Paris	March 12, 2016	AccorHotels Arena	Paris, France
3	Glory 29: Copenhagen	April 16, 2016	Forum Copenhagen	Copenhagen, Denmark
4	Glory 30: Los Angeles	May 13, 2016	Citizens Business Bank Arena	(United States) Ontario, California, USA
5	Glory 31: Amsterdam	June 25, 2016	Amsterdam RAI	Amsterdam, Netherlands
6	Glory 32: Virginia	July 22, 2016	Ted Constant Convocation Center	(United States) Norfolk, Virginia, USA
7	Glory 33: New Jersey	September 9, 2016	Sun National Bank Center	(United States) Trenton, New Jersey, USA
8	Glory 34: Denver	October 21, 2016	1stBank Center	(United States) Broomfield, Colorado, USA
9	Glory 35: Nice	November 5, 2016	Palais Nikaïa	Nice, France
10	Glory 36: Oberhausen	December 10, 2016	König Pilsener Arena	Oberhausen, Germany

== Glory 27: Chicago ==
Glory 27: Chicago
- Promotion: Glory
- Date: February 26, 2016
- Venue: Sears Centre
- City: (United States) Hoffman Estates, Illinois, USA

Event chronology
Glory 26: Amsterdam	Glory 27: Chicago	Glory 28: Paris

Glory 27: Chicago was a kickboxing event held on February 26, 2016, at the Sears Centre in Hoffman Estates, Illinois, USA.

=== Background ===
This event featured world title fight for the Glory Middleweight Championship between Artem Levin and Simon Marcus as headliner. Also this event featured 4-Man Middleweight Contender Tournament to earn a title shot for the Glory Middleweight Championship.

=== Results ===
Glory 27: Chicago
Weight Class				Method	Round	Time	Notes
Middleweight 85 kg	(Canada) Simon Marcus	def.	(Russia) Artem Levin (c)	DQ (Forfeit)	3	2:55	For the Glory Middleweight Championship
Middleweight 85 kg	(United States) Dustin Jacoby	def.	(United States) Wayne Barrett	TKO (Max Knockdowns)	2	1:06	Middleweight Contender Tournament Final
Featherweight 65 kg	(Georgia (country)) Giga Chikadze	def.	(United States) Kevin Vannostrand	Decision (Unanimous)	3	3:00	
Middleweight 85 kg	(United States) Dustin Jacoby	def.	(United States) Karl Roberson	TKO (2 Knockdowns)	2	2:56	Middleweight Contender Tournament Semi-Finals
Middleweight 85 kg	(United States) Wayne Barrett	def.	(Canada) Robert Thomas	Decision (Unanimous)	3	3:00	Middleweight Contender Tournament Semi-Finals
Superfight Series
Middleweight 85 kg	(United States) Joe Schilling	def.	(United States) Mike Lemaire	Decision (Unanimous)	3	3:00	
Heavyweight 120 kg	(Brazil) Anderson Braddock	def.	(United States) Maurice Greene	Decision (Unanimous)	3	3:00	
Heavyweight 120 kg	(Brazil) Guto Inocente	def.	(United States) Demoreo Dennis	KO (Spinning Heel Kick)	1	0:40	
Welterweight 77 kg	(United States) Richard Abraham	def.	(Poland) Pawel Jedrzejczyk	Decision (Unanimous)	3	3:00	
Welterweight 77 kg	(United States) Casey Greene	def.	(Mexico) Daniel Morales	Decision (Unanimous)	3	3:00	

=== 2016 Glory Middleweight Contender Tournament bracket ===
Semi-finals
(United States) Wayne Barrett	DEC
(Canada) Robert Thomas	3-0
(United States) Dustin Jacoby	TKO
(United States) Karl Roberson	3R.

Final
(United States) Wayne Barrett	2R.
(United States) Dustin Jacoby	TKO

== Glory 28: Paris ==
Glory 28: Paris
- Promotion: Glory
- Date: March 12, 2016
- Venue: AccorHotels Arena
- City: Paris, France

Event chronology
Glory 27: Chicago	Glory 28: Paris	Glory 29: Copenhagen

Glory 28: Paris was a kickboxing event held on March 12, 2016, at the AccorHotels Arena in Paris, France.

=== Background ===
This event featured three world title fight for the Glory Heavyweight Championship between Rico Verhoeven and Mladen Brestovac as headliner, Glory Light Heavyweight Championship between Saulo Cavalari and Artem Vakhitov, and the Glory Featherweight Championship between Serhiy Adamchuk and Mosab Amrani. Also this event featured 4-Man Lightweight Contender Tournament to earn a title shot for the Glory Lightweight Championship.

=== Results ===
Glory 28: Paris
Weight Class				Method	Round	Time	Notes
Heavyweight 120 kg	(Netherlands) Rico Verhoeven (c)	def.	(Croatia) Mladen Brestovac	Decision (Unanimous)	5	3:00	For the Glory Heavyweight Championship
Lightweight 70 kg	(Thailand) Sitthichai Sitsongpeenong	def.	(Armenia) Marat Grigorian	Decision (Unanimous)	3	3:00	Lightweight Contender Tournament Final
Welterweight 77 kg	(France) Cedric Doumbe	def.	(Netherlands) Murthel Groenhart	Decision (Unanimous)	3	3:00	
Lightweight 70 kg	(Armenia) Marat Grigorian	def.	(Russia) Anatoly Moiseev	Decision (Unanimous)	3	3:00	Lightweight Contender Tournament Semi-Finals
Lightweight 70 kg	(Thailand) Sitthichai Sitsongpeenong	def.	(Georgia (country)) Davit Kiria	Decision (Unanimous)	3	3:00	Lightweight Contender Tournament Semi-Finals
Superfight Series
Light Heavyweight 95 kg	(Russia) Artem Vakhitov	def.	(Brazil) Saulo Cavalari (c)	Decision (Unanimous)	5	3:00	For the Glory Light Heavyweight Championship
Heavyweight 120 kg	(United States) Xavier Vigney	def.	(France) Freddy Kemayo	Decision (Unanimous)	3	3:00	
Featherweight 65 kg	(Ukraine) Serhiy Adamchuk (c)	def.	(Morocco) Mosab Amrani	Decision (Unanimous)	5	3:00	For the Glory Featherweight Championship
Middleweight 85 kg	(Netherlands) Jason Wilnis	def.	(Belgium) Filip Verlinden	Decision (Unanimous)	3	3:00	
Lightweight 70 kg	(Canada) Josh Jauncey	def.	(France) Johan Tkac	TKO (Broken Nose)	2	3:00	Lightweight Contender Tournament Reserve Match
Featherweight 65 kg	(France) Eddy Nait Slimani	def.	(Brazil) Maykol Yurk	Decision (Unanimous)	3	3:00	

=== 2016 Glory Lightweight Contender Tournament bracket ===
Semi-finals
(Thailand) Sitthichai	DEC
(Georgia (country)) Davit Kiria	3-0
(Armenia) Marat Grigorian	DEC
(Russia) Anatoly Moiseev	3-0

Final
(Thailand) Sitthichai	DEC
(Armenia) Marat Grigorian	3-0

== Glory 29: Copenhagen ==
Glory 29: Copenhagen
- Promotion: Glory
- Date: April 16, 2016
- Venue: Forum Copenhagen
- City: Copenhagen, Denmark

Event chronology
Glory 28: Paris	Glory 29: Copenhagen	Glory 30: Los Angeles

Glory 29: Copenhagen was a kickboxing event held on April 16, 2016, at the Forum Copenhagen in Copenhagen, Denmark.

=== Background ===
This event featured world title fight for the Glory Welterweight Championship between Nieky Holzken and Yoann Kongolo as headliner, and 4-Man Heavyweight Contender Tournament to earn a title shot for the Glory Heavyweight Championship.

=== Results ===
Glory 29: Copenhagen
Weight Class				Method	Round	Time	Notes
Welterweight 77 kg	(Netherlands) Nieky Holzken (c)	def.	(Switzerland) Yoann Kongolo	Decision (Unanimous)	5	3:00	For the Glory Welterweight Championship
Heavyweight 120 kg	(Suriname) Ismael Londt	def.	(Netherlands) Jahfarr Wilnis	Decision (Split)	3	3:00	Heavyweight Contender Tournament Final
Lightweight 70 kg	(Ukraine) Serhiy Adamchuk	def.	(Denmark) Mohammed El Mir	Decision (Unanimous)	3	3:00	
Heavyweight 120 kg	(Netherlands) Jahfarr Wilnis	def.	(Russia) Kirill Kornilov	Decision (Unanimous)	3	3:00	Heavyweight Contender Tournament Semi-Finals
Heavyweight 120 kg	(Suriname) Ismael Londt	def.	(Brazil) Anderson Braddock	Decision (Majority)	3	3:00	Heavyweight Contender Tournament Semi-Finals
Superfight Series
Light Heavyweight 95 kg	(Democratic Republic of the Congo) Zack Mwekassa	def.	(France) Zinedine Hameur-Lain	Decision (Unanimous)	3	3:00	
Welterweight 77 kg	(Sweden) Meran Zangana	def.	(Brazil) Jonatan Oliveira	TKO (Max Knockdowns)	3	0:17	
Heavyweight 120 kg	(Slovakia) Tomáš Možný	def.	(Turkey) Cihad Kepenek	Decision (Extra round)	4	3:00	
Welterweight 77 kg	(Armenia) Harut Grigorian	def.	(Spain) Maximo Suarez	KO (Head Kick)	1	2:55	
Lightweight 70 kg	(Sweden) Abdou Karim Chorr	def.	(Denmark) Rhassan Muhareb	Decision (Unanimous)	3	3:00	

=== 2016 Glory Heavyweight Contender Tournament bracket ===
Semi-finals
(Brazil) Anderson Braddock	3-0
(Netherlands) Ismael Londt	DEC
(Netherlands) Jahfarr Wilnis	DEC
(Russia) Kirill Kornilov	2-0

Final
(Netherlands) Ismael Londt	DEC
(Netherlands) Jahfarr Wilnis	2-1

== Glory 30: Los Angeles ==
Glory 30: Los Angeles
- Promotion: Glory
- Date: May 13, 2016
- Venue: Citizens Business Bank Arena
- City: (United States) Ontario, California, USA

Event chronology
Glory 29: Copenhagen	Glory 30: Los Angeles	Glory 31: Amsterdam

Glory 30: Los Angeles was a kickboxing event held on May 13, 2016, at the Citizens Business Bank Arena in Ontario, California, USA.

=== Background ===
This event featured world title fight for the Glory Middleweight Championship between Simon Marcus and Dustin Jacoby as headliner, and 4-Man Welterweight Qualification Tournament with the winner being granted entry into Welterweight Contender Tournament later this year. The event also marked the launch of Glory's first women's division with the beginning of a Grand Prix tournament to crown the promotion's first Bantamweight Championship.

=== Results ===
Glory 30: Los Angeles
Weight Class				Method	Round	Time	Notes
Middleweight 85 kg	(Canada) Simon Marcus (c)	def.	(United States) Dustin Jacoby	Decision (Unanimous)	5	3:00	For the Glory Middleweight Championship
Welterweight 77 kg	(United States) Richard Abraham	def.	(United States) Francois Ambang	Decision (Split)	3	3:00	Welterweight Qualification Tournament Final
Lightweight 70 kg	(Armenia) Marat Grigorian	def.	(France) Djime Coulibaly	KO (Head Kick)	1	1:56	
Welterweight 77 kg	(United States) Francois Ambang	def.	(Mexico) Daniel Morales	Decision (Unanimous)	3	3:00	Welterweight Qualification Tournament Semi-Finals
Welterweight 77 kg	(United States) Richard Abraham	def.	(United States) Casey Greene	Decision (Unanimous)	3	3:00	Welterweight Qualification Tournament Semi-Finals
Superfight Series
Middleweight 85 kg	(Netherlands) Jason Wilnis	def.	(United States) Joe Schilling	Decision (Majority)	3	3:00	
Heavyweight 120 kg	(Brazil) Guto Inocente	def.	(Netherlands) Brian Douwes	Decision (Unanimous)	3	3:00	
Women's Super Bantamweight 55 kg	(United States) Tiffany van Soest	def.	(Morocco) Esma Hasshass	Decision (Unanimous)	3	3:00	Women's Super Bantamweight Grand Prix Quarter Final
Middleweight 85 kg	(United States) Mike Lemaire	def.	(United States) Karl Roberson	Decision (Unanimous)	3	3:00	
Light Heavyweight 95 kg	(United States) Manny Mancha	def.	(United States) Warren Thompson	Decision (Unanimous)	3	3:00	

=== 2016 Glory Welterweight Qualification Tournament bracket ===
Semi-finals
(United States) Casey Greene	3-0
(United States) Richard Abraham	DEC
(United States) Francois Ambang	DEC
(United States) Daniel Morales	3-0

Final
(United States) Richard Abraham	DEC
(United States) Francois Ambang	2-1

== Glory 31: Amsterdam ==
Glory 31: Amsterdam
- Promotion: Glory
- Date: June 25, 2016
- Venue: Amsterdam RAI
- City: Amsterdam, Netherlands

Event chronology
Glory 30: Los Angeles	Glory 31: Amsterdam	Glory 32: Virginia

Glory 31: Amsterdam was a kickboxing event held on June 25, 2016, at the Amsterdam RAI in Amsterdam, Netherlands.

=== Background ===
This event was originally scheduled to feature two world title fights for the Glory Lightweight Championship between Robin van Roosmalen and Sitthichai Sitsongpeenong, and the Glory Light Heavyweight Championship between Artem Vakhitov and Mourad Bouzidi, but Vakhitov was out due to injury and Zack Mwekassa replaced him for the interim title. Also this event featured 4-Man Welterweight Contender Tournament to earn a title shot for the Glory Welterweight Championship.

=== Results ===
Glory 31: Amsterdam
Weight Class				Method	Round	Time	Notes
Lightweight 70 kg	(Thailand) Sitthichai Sitsongpeenong	def.	(Netherlands) Robin van Roosmalen (c)	Decision (Split)	5	3:00	For the Glory Lightweight Championship
Welterweight 77 kg	(Netherlands) Murthel Groenhart	def.	(Switzerland) Yoann Kongolo	Decision (Unanimous)	3	3:00	Welterweight Contender Tournament Final
Heavyweight 120 kg	(Netherlands) Ismael Londt	def.	(Netherlands) Hesdy Gerges	Decision (Split)	3	3:00	
Welterweight 77 kg	(Switzerland) Yoann Kongolo	def.	(Armenia) Harut Grigorian	Decision (Split)	3	3:00	Welterweight Contender Tournament Semi-Finals
Welterweight 77 kg	(Netherlands) Murthel Groenhart	def.	(France) Karim Benmansour	TKO (2 knockdowns)	3	1:08	Welterweight Contender Tournament Semi-Finals
Superfight Series
Light Heavyweight 95 kg	(Democratic Republic of the Congo) Zack Mwekassa	def.	(Tunisia) Mourad Bouzidi	TKO (3 Knockdowns)	1	1:47	For the interim Glory Light Heavyweight Championship
Featherweight 65 kg	(Thailand) Saenchai PKSaenchaimuaythaigym	def.	(France) Eddy Nait Slimani	Decision (Unanimous)	3	3:00	
Lightweight 70 kg	(Russia) Anatoly Moiseev	def.	(Canada) Josh Jauncey	Decision (Unanimous)	3	3:00	
Women's Super Bantamweight 55 kg	(Netherlands) Isis Verbeek	def.	(Russia) Irina Mazepa	Decision (Split)	3	3:00	Women's Super Bantamweight Grand Prix Quarter Final
Welterweight 77 kg	(Netherlands) Eyevan Danenberg	def.	(Spain) Maximo Suarez	Decision (Unanimous)	3	3:00	

=== 2016 Glory Welterweight Contender Tournament bracket ===
Semi-finals
(Netherlands) Murthel Groenhart	TKO
(France) Karim Benmansour	3R.
(Switzerland) Yoann Kongolo	DEC
(Armenia) Harut Grigorian	2-1

Final
(Netherlands) Murthel Groenhart	DEC
(Switzerland) Yoann Kongolo	3-0

== Glory 32: Virginia ==
Glory 32: Virginia
- Promotion: Glory
- Date: July 22, 2016
- Venue: Ted Constant Convocation Center
- City: (United States) Norfolk, Virginia, USA

Event chronology
Glory 31: Amsterdam	Glory 32: Virginia	Glory 33: New Jersey

Glory 32: Virginia was a kickboxing event held on July 22, 2016, at the Ted Constant Convocation Center in Norfolk, Virginia, USA.

=== Background ===
This event featured world title fights for the Glory Featherweight Championship between Serhiy Adamchuk and Gabriel Varga as headliner. Also this event featured 4-Man Light Heavyweight Contender Tournament to earn a title shot for the Glory Light Heavyweight Championship.

=== Results ===
Glory 32: Virginia
Weight Class				Method	Round	Time	Notes
Featherweight 65 kg	(Canada) Gabriel Varga	def.	(Ukraine) Serhiy Adamchuk (c)	Decision (Majority)	5	3:00	For the Glory Featherweight Championship
Light Heavyweight 95 kg	(France) Zinedine Hameur-Lain	def.	(Brazil) Ariel Machado	KO (Knee to Liver)	2	1:00	Light Heavyweight Contender Tournament Final
Light Heavyweight 95 kg	(United States) Brian Collette	def.	(United States) Myron Dennis	Decision (Unanimous)	3	3:00	
Light Heavyweight 95 kg	(France) Zinedine Hameur-Lain	def.	(United States) Warren Thompson	KO (Punch)	1	0:12	Light Heavyweight Contender Tournament Semi-Finals
Light Heavyweight 95 kg	(Brazil) Ariel Machado	def.	(Ukraine) Pavel Zhuravlev	Decision (Unanimous)	3	3:00	Light Heavyweight Contender Tournament Semi-Finals
Superfight Series
Heavyweight 120 kg	(England) Chi Lewis Parry	def.	(United States) Maurice Greene	KO (Right Uppercut)	2	2:30	
Heavyweight 120 kg	(Brazil) Anderson Braddock	def.	(Germany) Gordon Haupt	KO (Liver Kick)	1	1:22	
Women's Super Bantamweight 595 kg	(Turkey) Funda Alkayis	def.	(Belgium) Vanessa de Waele	Decision (Unanimous)	3	3:00	Women's Super Bantamweight Grand Prix Reserve Match
Welterweight 77 kg	(United States) Francois Ambang	def.	(United States) Michael Stevens	Decision (Unanimous)	3	3:00	
Featherweight 65 kg	(Georgia (country)) Giga Chikadze	def.	(United States) Chris Mauceri	KO (Liver Kick)	1	2:20	
Catchweight 90 kg	(United States) Cedric Smith	def.	(United States) Roger Corbin	Decision (Unanimous)	3	3:00	

=== 2016 Glory Light Heavyweight Contender Tournament bracket ===
Semi-finals
(Ukraine) Pavel Zhuravlev	3-0
(Brazil) Ariel Machado	DEC
(United States) Warren Thompson	1R
(France) Zinedine Hameur-Lain	KO

Final
(Brazil) Ariel Machado	2R
(France) Zinedine Hameur-Lain	KO

== Glory 33: New Jersey ==
Glory 33: New Jersey
- Promotion: Glory
- Date: September 9, 2016
- Venue: Sun National Bank Center
- City: (United States) Trenton, New Jersey, USA

Event chronology
Glory 32: Virginia	Glory 33: New Jersey	Glory 34: Denver

Glory 33: New Jersey was a kickboxing event held on September 9, 2016, at the Sun National Bank Center in Trenton, New Jersey, USA.

=== Background ===
This event featured two world title fights for the Glory Heavyweight Championship between Rico Verhoeven and Anderson Braddock, for the Glory Middleweight Championship between Simon Marcus and Jason Wilnis. Also this event featured a 4-Man Featherweight Contender Tournament.

=== Results ===
Glory 33: New Jersey
Weight Class				Method	Round	Time	Notes
Heavyweight 120 kg	(Netherlands) Rico Verhoeven (c)	def.	(Brazil) Anderson Braddock	TKO (3 Knockdowns)	2	2:57	For the Glory Heavyweight Championship
Featherweight 65 kg	(Canada) Matt Embree	def.	(Georgia (country)) Giga Chikadze	TKO (Punch)	2	1:28	Featherweight Contender Tournament Final
Heavyweight 120 kg	(Brazil) Guto Inocente	def.	(Netherlands) Hesdy Gerges	Decision (Split)	3	3:00	
Featherweight 65 kg	(Canada) Matt Embree	def.	(South Korea) Lim Chi-bin	TKO (2 Knockdowns)	2	3:00	Featherweight Contender Tournament Semi-Finals
Featherweight 65 kg	(Georgia (country)) Giga Chikadze	def.	(Ukraine) Serhiy Adamchuk	Decision (Split)	3	3:00	Featherweight Contender Tournament Semi-Finals
Superfight Series
Middleweight 85 kg	(Netherlands) Jason Wilnis	def.	(Canada) Simon Marcus (c)	TKO (Referee Stoppage)	3	1:14	For the Glory Middleweight Championship
Heavyweight 120 kg	(United Kingdom) Chi Lewis-Parry	def.	(United States) Anthony McDonald	TKO (referee stoppage)	2	3:00	
Women's Super Bantamweight 55 kg	(Canada) Jessica Gladstone	def.	(Germany) Daniela Graf	Decision (Majority)	3	3:00	Women's Super Bantamweight Grand Prix Quarter Final
Welterweight 77 kg	(United States) Francois Ambang	def.	(Mexico) Daniel Morales	Decision (Unanimous)	3	3:00	
Catchweight 63.5 kg	(United States) Kevin Vannostrand	def.	(United States) David Moore	TKO (Referee Stoppage)	2	0:35	

=== 2016 Glory Featherweight Contender Tournament bracket ===
Semi-finals
(Ukraine) Serhiy Adamchuk	2-1
(Georgia (country)) Giga Chikadze	DEC
(South Korea) Lim Chi-bin	2R
(Canada) Matt Embree	TKO

Final
(Georgia (country)) Giga Chikadze	2R
(Canada) Matt Embree	KO

== Glory 34: Denver ==
Glory 34: Denver
- Promotion: Glory
- Date: October 21, 2016
- Venue: 1stBank Center
- City: (United States) Broomfield, Colorado, USA

Event chronology
Glory 33: New Jersey	Glory 34: Denver	Glory 35: Nice

Glory 34: Denver was a kickboxing event held on October 21, 2016, at the 1stBank Center in Broomfield, Colorado, USA.

=== Background ===
This event featured world title fights for the Glory Welterweight Championship between Nieky Holzken and Murthel Groenhart & the Glory Featherweight Championship between Gabriel Varga and Robin van Roosmalen. Also this event featured 4-Man Middleweight Contender Tournament.

=== Results ===
Glory 34: Denver
Weight Class				Method	Round	Time	Notes
Welterweight 77 kg	(Netherlands) Nieky Holzken (c)	def.	(Netherlands) Murthel Groenhart	Decision (Unanimous)	5	3:00	For the Glory Welterweight Championship
Middleweight 85 kg	(Nigeria) Israel Adesanya	def.	(Tunisia) Yousri Belgaroui	Decision (Split)	3	3:00	Middleweight Contender Tournament Final
Middleweight 85 kg	(Canada) Simon Marcus	def.	(United States) Dustin Jacoby	TKO (Injury)	2	0:01	
Middleweight 85 kg	(Nigeria) Israel Adesanya	def.	(Canada) Robert Thomas	Decision (Unanimous)	3	3:00	Middleweight Contender Tournament Semi-Finals
Middleweight 85 kg	(Tunisia) Yousri Belgaroui	def.	(Brazil) Ariel Machado	Decision (Unanimous)	3	3:00	Middleweight Contender Tournament Semi-Finals
Superfight Series
Featherweight 66 kg	(Netherlands) Robin van Roosmalen	def.	(Canada) Gabriel Varga (c)	TKO (Corner Stoppage)	4	3:00	For the Glory Featherweight Championship
Light Heavyweight 95 kg	(Brazil) Saulo Cavalari	def.	(Netherlands) Brian Douwes	Decision (Unanimous)	3	3:00	
Welterweight 77 kg	(Thailand) Thongchai Sitsongpeenong	def.	(United States) Casey Greene	KO (Punch)	2	2:58	
Welterweight 77 kg	(United States) Richard Abraham	def.	(Zimbabwe) Mike Mathetha	Decision (Unanimous)	3	3:00	
Featherweight 65 kg	(United States) Juston Houghton	def.	(United States) Jonathon Wyderko	Decision (Split)	3	3:00	

=== 2016 Glory Middleweight Contender Tournament bracket ===
Semi-finals
(Tunisia) Yousri Belgaroui	DEC
(Brazil) Ariel Machado	3-0
(Nigeria) Israel Adesanya	DEC
(Canada) Robert Thomas	3-0

Final
(Tunisia) Yousri Belgaroui	DEC
(Nigeria) Israel Adesanya	3-0

== Glory 35: Nice ==
Glory 35: Nice
- Promotion: Glory
- Date: November 5, 2016
- Venue: Palais Nikaïa
- City: Nice, France

Event chronology
Glory 34: Denver	Glory 35: Nice	Glory 36: Oberhausen

Glory 35: Nice was a kickboxing event held on November 5, 2016, at the Palais Nikaïa in Nice, France.

=== Background ===
This event featured world title fights For the Unification of the Light Heavyweight Championship between Artem Vakhitov and Zack Mwekassa as headliner. Also this event featured 4-Man Heavyweight Contender Tournament to earn a title shot for the Glory Heavyweight Championship and the last quarter-finals bout of the Women's Super Bantamweight Grand Prix.

=== Results ===
Glory 35: Nice
Weight Class				Method	Round	Time	Notes
Light Heavyweight 95 kg	(Russia) Artem Vakhitov (c)	def.	(Democratic Republic of the Congo) Zack Mwekassa (ic)	TKO (3 Knockdowns)	2	2:23	For the Unification of the Glory Light Heavyweight Championship
Heavyweight 120 kg	(Romania) Benjamin Adegbuyi	def.	(Croatia) Mladen Brestovac	Decision (Unanimous)	3	3:00	Heavyweight Contender Tournament Final
Light Heavyweight 95 kg	(Ukraine) Pavel Zhuravlev	def.	(France) Zinedine Hameur-Lain	TKO (Punches)	1	1:58	
Heavyweight 120 kg	(Croatia) Mladen Brestovac	def.	(Netherlands) Jahfarr Wilnis	TKO (Head Kick)	1	2:06	Heavyweight Contender Tournament Semi-Finals
Heavyweight 120 kg	(Romania) Benjamin Adegbuyi	def.	(Netherlands) Hesdy Gerges	Decision (Unanimous)	3	3:00	Heavyweight Contender Tournament Semi-Finals
Superfight Series
Heavyweight 120 kg	(France) Nicolas Wamba	def.	(France) Nordine Mahieddine	Decision (Unanimous)	3	3:00	
Welterweight 77 kg	(France) Karim Benmansour	def.	(Netherlands) Eyevan Danenberg	Decision (Split)	3	3:00	
Women's Super Bantamweight 55 kg	(France) Amel Dehby	def.	(South Korea) Ji-Waen Lee	Decision (Unanimous)	3	3:00	Women's Super Bantamweight Grand Prix Quarter Final
Lightweight 70 kg	(Netherlands) Christian Baya	def.	(Canada) Josh Jauncey	Decision (Majority)	3	3:00	
Featherweight 65 kg	(Thailand) Petpanomrung Kiatmuu9	def.	(Moldova) Stanislav Reniță	Decision (Unanimous)	3	3:00	
Featherweight 65 kg	(France) Cedric Castagna	def.	(France) Vang Moua	Decision (Unanimous)	3	3:00	

=== 2016 Glory Heavyweight Contender Tournament bracket ===
Semi-finals
(Romania) Benjamin Adegbuyi	DEC
(Netherlands) Hesdy Gerges	3-0
(Netherlands) Jahfarr Wilnis	R1
(Croatia) Mladen Brestovac	TKO

Final
(Romania) Benjamin Adegbuyi	DEC
(Croatia) Mladen Brestovac	3-0

== Glory 36: Oberhausen ==
Glory 36: Collision
- Promotion: Glory
- Date: December 10, 2016
- Venue: König Pilsener Arena
- City: Oberhausen, Germany

Event chronology
Glory 35: Nice	Glory 36: Collision	Glory 37: Los Angeles

Glory 36: Oberhausen is a kickboxing event held on December 10, 2016, at the König Pilsener Arena in Oberhausen, Germany.

=== Background ===
This event featured the highly anticipated Heavyweight showdown between GLORY Heavyweight champion, Rico Verhoeven and Badr Hari, promoted as "Glory Collision".

The event also featured two world title fights the first was for the Glory Welterweight Championship between Nieky Holzken and Cédric Doumbé and the second was for the Lightweight Championship between Sitthichai Sitsongpeenong and Marat Grigorian. Also this event featured a 4-Man Lightweight Contender Tournament and the Semi-Finals/Final of the Women's Super Bantamweight.

Davit Kiria has withdrawn from the event, for unknown reasons. Dylan Salvador has replaced him against Anatoly Moiseev in GLORY 36 lightweight 'Contender' tournament.

=== Results ===
Glory: Collision
Weight Class				Method	Round	Time	Notes
Heavyweight 120 kg	(Netherlands) Rico Verhoeven	def.	(Morocco) Badr Hari	TKO (Arm Injury)	2	1:22	
Welterweight 77 kg	(France) Cédric Doumbé	def.	(Netherlands) Nieky Holzken (c)	Decision (Split)	5	3:00	For the Glory Welterweight Championship
Heavyweight 120 kg	(Morocco) Jamal Ben Saddik	def.	(Suriname) Ismael Londt	Decision (Unanimous)	3	3:00	
Women's Super Bantamweight 55 kg	(United States) Tiffany van Soest	def.	(France) Amel Dehby	Decision (Unanimous)	3	3:00	Women's Super Bantamweight Grand Prix Final
Glory 36: Oberhausen
Lightweight 70 kg	(Thailand) Sitthichai Sitsongpeenong (c)	def.	(Armenia) Marat Grigorian	Decision (Split)	5	3:00	For the Glory Lightweight Championship
Lightweight 70 kg	(France) Dylan Salvador	def.	(Albania) Hysni Beqiri	Decision (Unanimous)	3	3:00	Lightweight Contender Tournament Final
Featherweight 65 kg	(France) Fabio Pinca	def.	(Morocco) Mosab Amrani	Decision (Split)	3	3:00	
Lightweight 70 kg	(Albania) Hysni Beqiri	def.	(Spain) Antonio Gomez	Decision (Unanimous)	3	3:00	Lightweight Contender Tournament Semi-Finals
Lightweight 70 kg	(France) Dylan Salvador	def.	(Russia) Anatoly Moiseev	Decision (Majority)	3	3:00	Lightweight Contender Tournament Semi-Finals
Superfight Series
Light Heavyweight 95 kg	(Netherlands) Michael Duut	def.	(Germany) Danyo Ilunga	Decision (Extra Round)	4	3:00	
Welterweight 77 kg	(Armenia) Harut Grigorian	def.	(Germany) Danijel Solaja	TKO (Punches)	1	1:01	
Women's Super Bantamweight 55 kg	(France) Amel Dehby	def.	(Netherlands) Isis Verbeek	Decision (Unanimous)	3	3:00	Women's Super Bantamweight Grand Prix Semi Final
Women's Super Bantamweight 55 kg	(United States) Tiffany van Soest	def.	(Canada) Jessica Gladstone	Decision (Unanimous)	3	3:00	Women's Super Bantamweight Grand Prix Semi Final
Lightweight 70 kg	(Netherlands) Tyjani Beztati	def.	(Russia) Andrej Brühl	Decision (Unanimous)	3	3:00	

=== 2016 Glory Lightweight Contender Tournament bracket ===
Semi-finals
(Russia) Anatoly Moiseev	3r.
(France) Dylan Salvador	DEC
(Albania) Hysni Beqiri	DEC
(Spain) Antonio Gomez	3r.

Final
(France) Dylan Salvador	DEC
(Albania) Hysni Beqiri	3r.

== See also ==
- 2016 in K-1
- 2016 in Kunlun Fight
