= Anatoly Moiseev =

Russian kickboxer (born 1989)

- Born: 11 April 1989 (age 37); Krymsk, Russia
- Height: 178 cm (5 ft 10 in)
- Weight: 70 kg (150 lb; 11 st)
- Division: Lightweight
- Style: Kickboxing
- Stance: Orthodox
- Years active: 2010–present

Kickboxing record
- Total: 29
- Wins: 21
- By knockout: 7
- Losses: 8
- By knockout: 2

Anatoly Moiseev (Russian: Анатолий Моисеев) is a Russian Lightweight kickboxer. He was the 71 kg-WAKO Russian and world champion, winning both titles in 2011, and the 2019 WLF 70kg Tournament winner.

He was ranked as a top ten lightweight by Combat Press between July 2016 and March 2017.

He is ranked as the eighth lightweight in the world by LiverKick.com as of September 2016.

== Kickboxing career ==
Anatoly took part in the 2017 Glory Lightweight Contender tournament, facing Christian Baya in the semifinals. He lost the fight by split decision.

Moiseev participated in the 2018 Kunlun Fight 70 kg Qualifying tournament, being scheduled to face Nordin Ben Moh in the semifinals. He defeated Ben Moh by unanimous decision in semifinals, and TKO'd Kong Lingfeng in the first round to win the qualifying tournament.

He lost his next fight, to the former Glory Lightweight champion Davit Kiria, by unanimous decision.

Anatoly Moiseev took part in the 2018 KLF 70 kg World tournament, being scheduled to fight Marouan Toutouh in the quarterfinals. Moiseev was a replacement for Superbon Banchamek, taking the fight on a ten days notice. Toutouh won the fight by unanimous decision.

Moiseev was scheduled to take part in the 2019 Kunlun Fight 70 kg tournament on December 31. The event was later rescheduled for March 8, 2020. Due to the COVID-19 pandemic, the event was ultimately cancelled.

== Championships and accomplishments ==
Amateur

- World Association of Kickboxing Organizations
  - 2011 WAKO World Championships Low Kick -71 kg (gold)

Professional

- Wu Lin Feng
  - 2019 Wu Lin Feng World Tournament -70 kg Champion

== Mixed martial arts record ==
Professional record breakdown
5 matches	5 wins	0 losses
By knockout	3	0
By submission	1	0
By decision	1	0

Res.	Record	Opponent	Method	Event	Date	Round	Time	Location	Notes
Win	5–0	Nurzhigit Karaev	Decision (split)	MMA Series 51: Black Smith	21 May 2022	3	5:00	Anapa, Russia	
Win	4–0	Sherzod Khusunov	Submission (guillotine choke)	Blacksmith Fight Championship 3	25 September 2021	1	0:32	Anapa, Russia	
Win	3–0	Azatbek Erkinbek Uulu	TKO (punches)	Open Fighting Championship 6	4 July 2021	1	4:03	Krasnodar, Russia	
Win	2–0	Konstantin Cherednichenko	TKO (body shots)	MMA SERIES-27: Time of New Heroes 14	3 March 2021	1	0:34	Saint Petersburg, Russia	
Win	1–0	Anthony Serre	TKO (low kicks)	MMA SERIES-17: Blacksmith Fighting Championship 2	10 October 2020	1	1:06	Anapa, Russia	

== Kickboxing record ==
Professional kickboxing record
21 wins (7 (T)KOs), 8 losses, draws, 0 no contests
Date	Result	Opponent	Event	Location	Method	Round	Time
2023-10-28	Loss	(Iran) Aghil Ghorbanpoor	Blacksmith Fight Championship	Krasnodar, Russia	KO (punches)	1	
2023-07-29	Loss	(China) Ouyang Feng	Wu Lin Feng 540	Tangshan, China	KO (low kick)	1	
Loses the Wu Lin Feng 70kg World title.
2019-05-25	Win	(Greece) Giannis Boukis	Wu Lin Feng 2019: WLF 70kg WorldChampionship Tournament, Final	Zhengzhou, China	KO (spinning back kick to the body)	1	
Wins the vacant Wu Lin Feng 70kg World title.
2019-05-25	Win	(Netherlands) Mitchel Lammers	Wu Lin Feng 2019: WLF 70 kg Championship Tournament, Semi Final	Zhengzhou, China	TKO (corner stoppage)	1	3:00
2019-05-25	Win	(China) Zhang Weipeng	Wu Lin Feng 2019: WLF 70 kg World Championship Tournament, Quarter Final	Zhengzhou, China	KO (body punch)	1	2:40
2018-10-13	Loss	(Morocco) Marouan Toutouh	Kunlun Fight 77: Hollow Throne (quarter-finals)	Tongling, China	Decision (unanimous)	3	3:00
2018-08-05	Loss	(Georgia (country)) Davit Kiria	Kunlun Fight 75	Sanya, China	Decision (unanimous)	3	3:00
2018-04-01	Win	(China) Kong Lingfeng	Kunlun Fight 71, Final	Qingdao, China	TKO	1	3:00
2018-04-01	Win	(Morocco) Nordin Ben Moh	Kunlun Fight 71, Semi Finals	Qingdao, China	Decision (unanimous)	3	3:00
2017-06-10	Loss	(Angola) Christian Baya	Glory 42: Paris - Lightweight Contender Tournament, Semi Finals	Paris, France	Decision (split)	3	3:00
2017-01-24	Loss	(France) Mohamed Diaby	Kung Fu World Championship - 75 kg Contender Sanda Tournament, Semi Final	Hunan, China	KO (right high kick)	2	1:55
2016-12-10	Loss	(France) Dylan Salvador	Glory 36: Oberhausen - Lightweight Contender Tournament, Semi Finals	Oberhausen, Germany	Decision (unanimous)	3	3:00
2016-09-11	Win	(Georgia (country)) Tamaz Izoria	Kunlun Fight 52	Fuzhou, China	Decision (unanimous)	3	3:00
2016-06-25	Win	(Canada) Josh Jauncey	Glory 31: Amsterdam	Amsterdam, Netherlands	Decision (unanimous)	3	3:00
2016-05-14	Win	(Suriname) Serginio Kanters	Kunlun Fight 44	Khabarovsk, Russia	KO (right hook)	2	0:28
2016-03-12	Loss	(Armenia) Marat Grigorian	Glory 28: Paris - Lightweight Contender Tournament, Semi Finals	Paris, France	Decision (unanimous)	3	3:00
2016-01-23	Win	(Spain) Jonay Risco	Kunlun Fight 37	Sanya, China	Decision (unanimous)	3	3:00
2015-11-06	Win	(Croatia) Teo Mikelić	Glory 25: Milan	Milan, Italy	Decision (unanimous)	3	3:00
2015-09-04	Win	(Italy) Rosario Presti	Tatneft Cup 2015	Kazan, Russia	Decision	4	3:00
2015-08-15	Win	(Romania) Cristian Milea	Kunlun Fight 29	Sochi, Russia	Decision (unanimous)	3	3:00
2015-05-29	Win	(Netherlands) Malic Groenberg	Tatneft Cup 2015	Kazan, Russia	Decision	4	3:00
2015-04-24	Win	(Russia) Evgeniy Kurovsky	W5 Grand Prix: Kitek	Moscow, Russia	TKO	1	3:00
2015-04-03	Win	(Germany) Max Baumert	Glory 20: Dubai	Dubai, UAE	KO (right high kick)	1	0:38
2015-02-21	Win	(Israel) Itay Gershon	Tatneft Cup 2015	Kazan, Russia	Decision	4	3:00
2014-09-19	Win	(Russia) Vasilly Goral	Tech-KREP-FC-PRIME 3	Krasnodar, Russia	Decision (unanimous)	3	3:00
2014-03-21	Win	(Netherlands) Romano Morjoner	Tech-KREP-FC-PRIME 1	Krasnodar, Russia	TKO	2	1:50
2013-08-31	Win	(Russia) Islam Murtazaev	Oracul Fight Zone 2013	Russia	Decision (unanimous)	3	3:00
2013-06-02	Win	(Serbia) Alexander Topich	GFC — Challenge	Krasnodar, Russia	Decision (unanimous)	3	3:00
2010-11-26	Win	(Russia) Vitaliy Soroka	Oracul Fight Zone 2010	Krasnodar, Russia	Decision	3	3:00
Legend: Win Loss Draw/no contest Notes

== See also ==
- List of male kickboxers
