= Sitthichai Sitsongpeenong =

Thai Muay Thai kickboxer (born 1991)

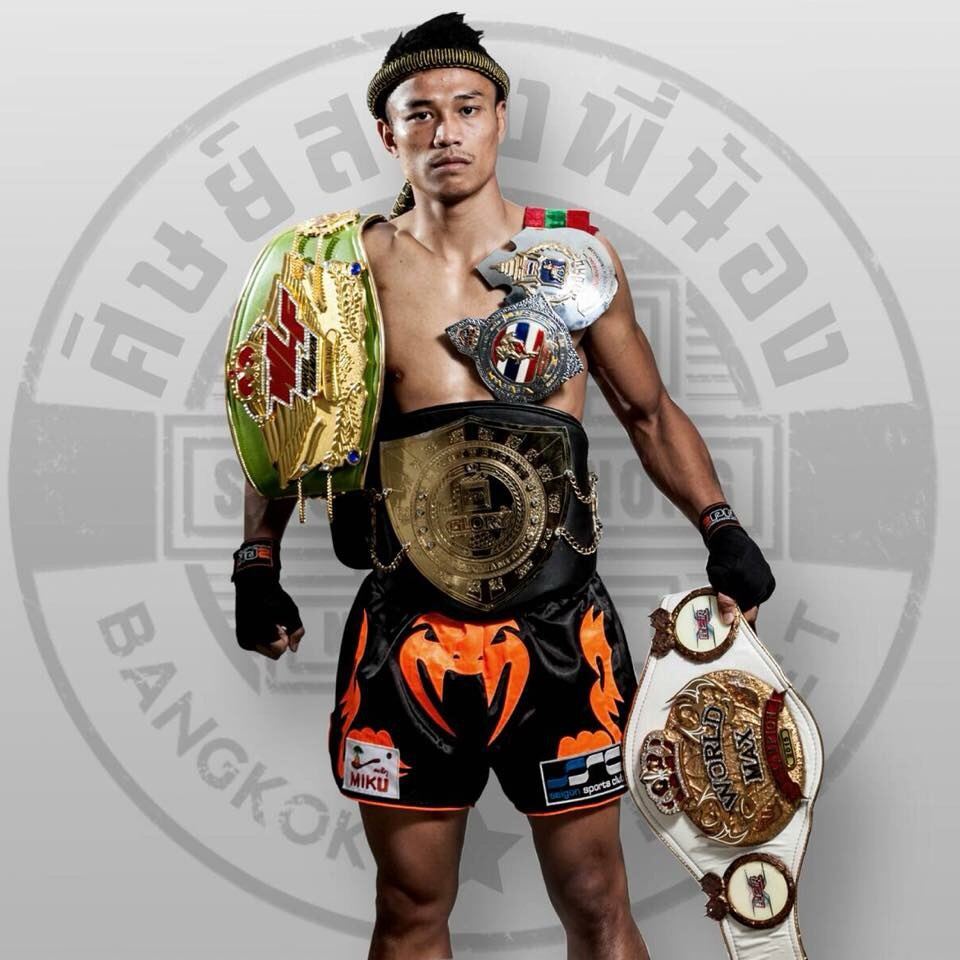
- Born: Anulak Jansuk; September 23, 1991 (age 35); Buriram, Thailand
- Native name: สิทธิชัย ศิษย์สองพี่น้อง
- Other names: Sittichai Sitkruyaem; Killer Kid
- Height: 1.74 m (5 ft 8 1/2 in)
- Weight: 70 kg (154 lb; 11 st)
- Division: Featherweight (2020–present); Lightweight (2015–2019); Welterweight (2011–2014); Super Welterweight (2013, 2014–2016)
- Reach: 71 in (180 cm)
- Style: Muay Thai
- Stance: Southpaw
- Fighting out of: Bangkok, Thailand
- Team: Sitsongpeenong Muaythai
- Trainer: Anuaysil Bunphengsri "Monlit Sitphodaeng", Jakkrit Fairtex, Tong Sitsongpeenong, Phaniang Poontharat
- Years active: 2002–present

Kickboxing record
- Total: 175
- Wins: 129
- By knockout: 39
- Losses: 40
- By knockout: 4
- Draws: 6

Other information
- Website: www.sitsongpeenong.com
- Last updated on: January 28, 2016

Sitthichai Sitsongpeenong (Thai: สิทธิชัย ศิษย์สองพี่น้อง, Thai pronunciation: [sìttʰíʨʰaj sìtsɔ̌ːŋpʰîːnɔ́ːŋ]; born September 23, 1991) is a Thai Muay Thai kickboxer who competed in ONE Championship. Sitthichai is a former Lumpinee Stadium Welterweight Champion and Glory Lightweight Champion. Combat Press ranks him as the #3 lightweight kickboxer in the world.

== Biography and career ==
=== Muay Thai ===
Sitthichai Sitsongpeenong was born as Anulak Jansuk in Buriram, Thailand on September 23, 1991. He had his first fight at the age of 11 in 2002.

His first fight outside of Thailand was in a 4-man tournament at 63.5 kg at the "Nuit des Titans" event in Tours, France on 30 January 2010. He beat Fabio Pinca by decision in the first fight and Anuwat Kaewsamrit by decision in the final to win the 4-Man Tournament.

His second fight outside of Thailand was at the “La Nuit des Champions” event in Marseille, France on 28 November 2010. He won against Damien Alamos by decision over 5 rounds.

He lost in the final of the “Fuktien Group 8-Man Tournament 8-Man @146 lbs against Iquezang Kor.Rungthanakeat by TKO in the 5th round (broken collarbone) at Omnoi Stadium on 23 July 2011.

His first fight back after recovery from injury 5 months later was at the “A1 - WCC” event in Lyon, France on December 8, 2011, where he beat Fares Bechar by TKO in the fourth round.

Sitthichai went on to win :

- The “Toyota Vigo 8-Man Marathon” at 147 lbs in Chonburi, Thailand on May 31, 2012.
- The Thailand (PAT) Welterweight Championship Title at 147 lbs against Petchmankong Gaiyang 5 Daow by 5-round decision at Lumpinee Stadium on September 25, 2012
- The “1 - King” 4-Man Tournament at 70 kg against Puengluang Sitpupantu by TKO in the first round in Koh Chang, Thailand on January 5, 2013.

A rematch between Sitthichai and Fabio Pinca went down at Best of Siam 3 in Paris, France, on February 14, 2013, and he came out on top again, winning a unanimous decision.

He won the “Toyota Vigo 8-Man Tournament” @70 kg against Dechrid Poptheeratham by decision after 3 rounds in Udon Thani on March 29, 2013.

It was reported that he would fight Kamel Jemel at the WBC World Muay Thai Millennium Championship in Saint-Pierre, Réunion on September 7, 2013. However, he denied ever being on the card.

He beat Juri Kehl on points at MAX Muay Thai 2 in Pattaya, Thailand on June 29, 2013. It was a fairly one-sided fight, although Kehl did land a high kick in round two which knocked Sitthichai down. However, the referee counted it as a slip.

He won by decision against Jordan Watson at MAX Muay Thai 3 in Zhengzhou, China on August 10, 2013.

He defended his Thailand (PAT) Welterweight Championship @147 lbs against Dechrid Poptheeratham in Bangkok at November 23, 2013.

He outpointed Wanchalerm Udduonmuang in the main event of Yokkao 6 in Pattaya, Thailand on January 4, 2014.

He took an extension round decision over Chingiz Allazov at Thai Boxe Mania in Turin, Italy on January 25, 2014.

Sitthichai defeated Mohamed Khamal via UD at Legend 3: Pour Homme in Milan, Italy on April 5, 2014.

He knocked out Johann Fauveau in round two at Best of Siam 5 in Paris, France, on June 14, 2014.

He defended his Thailand (PAT) Welterweight Championship @147 lbs and won the Lumpinee Stadium Welterweight Championship @147 lbs against Maruay Sitjaepond at Lumpinee Stadium, Bangkok on October 28, 2014.

His last fight under Muay Thai rules to date was a victory against Crice Bousouko at 70 kg at the La Nuit des Titans 2015 event in Tours, France on February 7, 2015.

=== Kickboxing ===
In his first ever fight under kickboxing rules, he lost a highly disputed decision to Enriko Gogokhia on the Oktagon 2013 event that served as the undercard to Glory 7: Milan in Milan, Italy on April 20, 2013. He had initially been set to face Davit Kiria on the main card but was demoted to the prelims when his opponent was changed.

He won the “La Nuit des Champions” 4-Man Tournament (under K-1 rules) event in Marseille, France by defeating Abdellah Ezbiri in the final by TKO in the second round on November 22, 2014.

He won the Fight League - Grand Prix 8-Man tournament 70 kg by defeating Yasssin Baiter by KO in the second round in the Final in Tangier, Morocco on August 8, 2015.

=== Kunlun Fight ===
He won his first major tournament under kickboxing rules at the Kunlun Fight 15: The World MAX - Middleweight 4-Man Tournament at 70 kg by defeating Murthel Groenhart by KO in 3 rounds and Andy Souwer by decision in 3 rounds in Nanjing, China on January 3, 2015.

He started fighting exclusively under kickboxing rules at the Kunlun Fight 24 event in Verona, Italy where he lost to Dylan Salvador by decision after three rounds on May 2, 2015.

He won the “2015 Kunlun Fight 70kg World Max Tournament" by defeating Enriko Gogokhia by decision in the 4th extension round at Kunlun Fight 37 in Sanya, China on 23 January 2016.

He participated in “Kunlun Fight 64-Man 70kg World Max Tournament 2016” and qualified for the Final 16-Man by defeating Walid Hamid by KO in the second round and Mohamed Mezouari by 4th extension round decision in the final at Kunlun Fight 43 in Zhoukou, China on 23 Apr, 2016. He finished as a quarter finalist being defeated by the tournament champion, Superbon Banchamek at Kunlun Fight 53 - World Max Tournament 2016 Final 8 on 24 September 2016 in Beijing, China.

=== Wu Lin Feng ===
Sittichai won the 8-man Yi Long Challenge Tournament for the 71 kg title by WLF, held in China. He defeated Hasan Toy, Enriko Kehl and Dzhabar Askerov. In the finals, on November 4, 2017, he fought the then-current champion, Yi Long in the Dragon King Challenge. He won via second round head kick KO to secure the Wu Lin Feng 71kg World Championship.

=== Glory ===
In his debut at Glory he won the Lightweight Contender Tournament at 70 kg at Glory 22 in Lille, France on June 5, 2015 by defeating Davit Kiria by TKO in the second round and Josh Jauncey by unanimous decision in the final.

Winning the Glory contender tournament led to a fight with Robin van Roosmalen, which he lost in a highly controversial decision during Glory 25 in Monza, Italy on November 6, 2015.

He competed and won the “Glory Lightweight Contender Tournament” at 70 kg again, defeating Davit Kiria and Marat Grigorian (whom he had beaten previously at Kunlun Fight) at Glory 28 in Paris, France on March 12, 2016.

==== Glory Lightweight Champion ====
He won a rematch vs Robin van Roosmalen at Glory 31 on June 25, 2016 in Amsterdam, Netherlands. Which he won by split decision and became the Glory Lightweight Champion at 70 kg.

Sittichai defended his Glory Lightweight title at Glory 39 on March 25, 2017 in Brussels, Belgium against Dylan Salvador. It was the third fight between the two. He won the fight by TKO.

Sitthichai defended his Glory Lightweight Championship another four times. On February 16, 2018, he defeated Christian Baya by unanimous decision at Glory 50 in Chicago. He outscored Tyjani Beztati to retain the title on May 12, 2018 at Glory 53 in Lille, France. Sitthichai would then face Marat Grigorian in the fourth meeting between the two on August 25, 2018, winning by split decision at Glory 57 in Shenzhen, China. On November 2, 2018, he defeated Josh Jauncey by unanimous decision at Glory 61 in New York City.

On May 17, 2019, Sitthichai lost the Glory Lightweight Championship to Marat Grigorian by unanimous decision in their fifth meeting at Glory 65 in Utrecht, Netherlands.

=== ONE Championship ===
On May 14, 2020, it was announced that Sitthichai had signed with ONE Championship.

Sitthichai was scheduled to make his ONE debut at ONE Championship: No Surrender on July 31, 2020, where was set to face Superbon Banchamek for a third time. Under kickboxing rules, he lost to Superbon by unanimous decision.

Sitthichai is next scheduled to face promotional newcomer Tayfun Özcan at ONE Championship: Battleground on July 30, 2021. After Özcan suffered an injury in training, he was rescheduled to face Tawanchai P.K. Saenchaimuaythaigym under Muay Thai rules at ONE Championship: Battleground 3 on August 27, 2021. Sitthichai defeated Tawanchai by split decision.

==== ONE Featherweight Kickboxing World Grand Prix ====
Sitthichai faced Tayfun Özcan in the quarter-finals of the 2021 ONE Kickboxing Featherweight World Grand Prix at ONE Championship: First Strike. Sitthichai defeated Özcan by split decision.

Sitthichai was scheduled to face Davit Kiria in the semifinals of the ONE Featherweight Kickboxing World Grand Prix at ONE: Only the Brave on January 28, 2022. Sitthichai won the fight by unanimous decision.

He faced Chingiz Allazov in the ONE Featherweight Kickboxing World Grand Prix Final at ONE: X on March 26, 2022. He lost the fight by unanimous decision.

==== Post-Grand Prix ====
Sitthichai faced Mohammed Boutasaa at ONE on Prime Video 3 on October 21, 2022. the fight by unanimous decision.

Sitthichai faced Eddie Abasolo at ONE Friday Fights 22 on June 23, 2023. Sitthichai won the fight by unanimous decision.

Sitthichai faced Marat Grigorian at ONE 165 on January 28, 2024. He lost the fight by a third-round knockout.

Sitthichai faced Masaaki Noiri on June 8, 2024, at ONE 167. He won the fight via unanimous decision.

Sitthichai faced Shadow Singha Mawynn on December 20, 2024, at ONE Friday Fights 92. He lost the fight via unanimous decision.

Sitthichai faced Nico Carrillo on April 5, 2025, at ONE Fight Night 30. He lost the fight via knockout in round two.

On August 19, 2025, it was reported that Sitthichai was removed from the ONE roster.

Sitthichai challenged the KNOCK OUT Black Super Welterweight champion Kaito Ono at KNOCK OUT.60 - K.O CLIMAX 2025 on December 30, 2025. He lost the title bout by a narrow, highly contested unanimous decision.

== Titles and achievements ==
=== Kickboxing ===
- ONE Championship
  - 2021 ONE Kickboxing Featherweight World Grand Prix Runner-up
- Glory
  - 2018 Year in Review - Fighter of the Year
  - 2016-2019 Glory Lightweight Champion (one time; six defenses)
  - 2016 Glory Lightweight (-70 kg/154.3 lb) Contender Tournament Winner
  - 2015 Glory Lightweight (-70 kg/154.3 lb) Contender Tournament Winner
- Kunlun Fight
  - 2016 Kunlun Fight World Max Group I Tournament Winner
  - 2015 Kunlun Fight World Max Tournament Champion
  - 2015 Kunlun Fight World Max Group A Tournament Winner
- Wu Lin Feng
  - 2017 Wu Lin Feng World Championship (-71 kg)
  - 2017 WLF Yi Long Challenge Tournament Winner
- The Fight League
  - 2015 The Fight League 8 Man Tournament Champion
- Nuit des Champions
  - 2014 NDC K-1 Rules -70 kg Tournament Champion

=== Muaythai ===
- Lumpinee Stadium
  - 2014 Lumpinee Stadium Welterweight Champion (147 lbs)
- Professional Boxing Association of Thailand
  - 2012-2014 Thailand (PAT) Welterweight Champion (147 lbs)
- Toyota Cup
  - 2013 Toyota Vigo Marathon Tournament Champion (154 lbs)
  - 2012 Toyota Vigo Marathon Tournament Champion (147 lbs)
- 1–King
  - 2013 Champions Club “1–King” 4-Man Tournament Champion (-70 kg)
- Fuktien Group
  - 2011 Fuktien Group Tournament Runner-up (147 lbs)
- Nuit des Champions
  - 2010 "Nuit des Champions" Muaythai belt (-64 kg)
- Nuit des Titans
  - 2010 "Nuit des Titans" 4 Man Muaythai Tournament Champion (140 lbs)

=== Accomplishments ===
- International Muaythai Ambassador
  - 2015 Sports Writers Association of Thailand - International Muaythai Ambassador
- glorykickboxing.com
  - 2018 Year in Review - Fighter of the Year
- CombatPress.com
  - 2017 Knockout of the Year vs. Yi Long on November 4
  - 2015 Fighter of the Year
  - 2019 Fight of the Year vs. Marat Grigorian
- BoxeMag.com
  - 2014 BoxeMag Best International Fighter of the Year

=== Ranking ===
- CombatPress.com
  - N°1 Combat Press.com at Pound-For-Pound, January 2019
  - N°1 Combat Press.com at Lightweight (154 lb), January 2019
- Liver Kick.com
  - N°2 Liver Kick.com at Lightweight (154 lb), March 2018

== Fight record ==
Professional Kickboxing and Muay Thai record
129 Wins (39 (T)KO's), 40 Losses, 6 Draws
Date	Result	Opponent	Event	Location	Method	Round	Time
2026-12-30		(Japan) Yoshiro Tsuzaki	KNOCK OUT.17 ～K.O CLIMAX 2026～	Tokyo, Japan			
2026-09-05	Loss	(Japan) Taimu Hisai	KNOCK OUT.68 ～KNOCKIN' on the WORLD～	Yokohama, Japan	KO (Uppercut)	2	1:47
2026-06-30	Loss	(Brazil) Luis Cajaiba	WBC Muay Thai, Rajadamnern Stadium	Bangkok, Thailand	Decision (Unanimous)	5	3:00
For the WBC Muay Thai Diamond Super Welterweight (154 lbs) title.
2026-04-18	Draw	(Japan) Ryoki	KNOCK OUT.63 Spring FES in Okinawa	Okinawa, Japan	Decision (Unanimous)	3	3:00
For the KNOCK OUT Black Super Welterweight Championship.
2025-12-30	Loss	(Japan) Kaito	KNOCK OUT.60 - K.O CLIMAX 2025	Tokyo, Japan	Decision (Unanimous)	3	3:00
For the KNOCK OUT Black Super Welterweight Championship.
2025-04-05	Loss	(Scotland) Nico Carrillo	ONE Fight Night 30, Lumpinee Stadium	Bangkok, Thailand	KO (Left hook to the body)	2	2:20
2024-12-07	Loss	(Thailand) Shadow Singha Mawynn	ONE Friday Fights 92, Lumpinee Stadium	Bangkok, Thailand	Decision (Unanimous)	3	3:00
2024-06-08	Win	(Japan) Masaaki Noiri	ONE 167	Bangkok, Thailand	Decision (Unanimous)	3	3:00
2024-01-28	Loss	(Armenia) Marat Grigorian	ONE 165	Tokyo, Japan	KO (Knee and Punch to the Body)	3	1:20
2023-09-08	Loss	(Iran) Mohammad Siasarani	ONE Friday Fights 32, Lumpinee Stadium	Bangkok, Thailand	Decision (Unanimous)	3	3:00
2023-06-23	Win	(United States) Eddie Abasolo	ONE Friday Fights 22, Lumpinee Stadium	Bangkok, Thailand	Decision (Unanimous)	3	3:00
2022-10-22	Win	(Morocco) Mohammed Boutasaa	ONE on Prime Video 3	Kuala Lumpur, Malaysia	Decision (Unanimous)	3	3:00
2022-03-26	Loss	(Belarus) Chingiz Allazov	ONE: X	Kallang, Singapore	Decision (Unanimous)	3	3:00
ONE Featherweight Kickboxing World Grand Prix Final
2022-01-28	Win	(Georgia (country)) Davit Kiria	ONE: Only the Brave	Kallang, Singapore	Decision (Unanimous)	3	3:00
ONE Featherweight Kickboxing World Grand Prix Semi-finals
2021-10-15	Win	(Turkey) Tayfun Özcan	ONE: First Strike	Kallang, Singapore	Decision (Split)	3	3:00
ONE Featherweight Kickboxing World Grand Prix Quarter-Final
2021-08-27	Win	(Thailand) Tawanchai P.K. Saenchaimuaythaigym	ONE: Battleground 3	Kallang, Singapore	Decision (Split)	3	3:00
2020-07-31	Loss	(Thailand) Superbon Banchamek	ONE: No Surrender	Bangkok, Thailand	Decision (Unanimous)	3	3:00
2019-11-15	Win	(Uzbekistan) Bobirjon Tagaev	Macau Fight 2019	Macau	Ext.R Decision (Unanimous)	4	3:00
2019-05-17	Loss	(Armenia) Marat Grigorian	Glory 65: Utrecht	Netherlands	Decision (Unanimous)	5	3:00
Loses the Glory Lightweight Championship.
2018-11-02	Win	(Canada) Josh Jauncey	Glory 61: New York	New York, United States	Decision (Unanimous)	5	3:00
Defending the Glory Lightweight Championship.
2018-08-25	Win	(Armenia) Marat Grigorian	Glory 57: Shenzhen	Shenzhen, China	Decision (Split)	5	3:00
Defending the Glory Lightweight Championship.
2018-05-12	Win	(Morocco) Tyjani Beztati	Glory 53: Lille	Lille, France	Decision (Unanimous)	5	3:00
Defending the Glory Lightweight Championship.
2018-02-16	Win	(Angola) Christian Baya	Glory 50:Chicago	Chicago, United States	Decision (unanimous)	5	3:00
Defending the Glory Lightweight Championship.
2017-11-04	Win	(China) Yi Long	Wu Lin Feng 2017: Yi Long VS Sitthichai	Kunming, China	KO (Left High Kick)	2	1:10
Wins the Wu Lin Feng World Championship.
2017-10-07	Win	(Russia) Dzhabar Askerov	Wu Lin Feng 2017: WLF VS ACB & ACB KB 11 - Yi Long Challeng Tournament Final	Zhengzhou, China	Decision (Unanimous)	3	3:00
Wins the WLF Yi Long Challenge Tournament.
2017-09-02	Win	(Germany) Enriko Kehl	Wu Lin Feng 2017: World Championship Xi'an - Yi Long Challenge Tournament Semi-finals	Xi'an, China	Decision (Unanimous)	3	3:00
2017-07-01	Win	(Netherlands) Hasan Toy	Wu Lin Feng 2017: China VS Spain - Yi Long Challenge 1/4 Finals	Zhengzhou, China	Decision (Unanimous)	3	3:00
2017-03-25	Win	(France) Dylan Salvador	Glory 39: Brussels	Brussels, Belgium	TKO (Knee to the Body)	4	2:58
Defending the Glory Lightweight Championship.
2016-12-10	Win	(Armenia) Marat Grigorian	Glory 36: Oberhausen	Oberhausen, Germany	Decision (Split)	5	3:00
Defending the Glory Lightweight Championship.
2016-09-24	Loss	(Thailand) Superbon Banchamek	Kunlun Fight 53 - World MAX Tournament 2016 Final 8	Beijing, China	Decision (Unanimous)	3	3:00
2016-08-20	Win	(Portugal) Diogo Neves	Kunlun Fight 50 – World MAX Tournament 2016 Final 16	Jinan, China	Decision (unanimous)	3	3:00
Qualified to Kunlun Fight 2016 70kg World MAX Tournament Final 8.
2016-06-25	Win	(Netherlands) Robin van Roosmalen	Glory 31: Amsterdam	Amsterdam, Netherlands	Decision (Split)	5	3:00
Wins the Glory Lightweight Championship Champion.
2016-04-23	Win	(Morocco) Mohamed Mezouari	Kunlun Fight 43 – World MAX 2016 Group I Tournament Final	Zhoukou, China	Ext. R Decision (4-1)	4	3:00
Qualified to Kunlun Fight 2016 70kg World MAX Tournament Final 16.
2016-04-23	Win	(Morocco) Walid Hamid	Kunlun Fight 43 – World MAX 2016 Group I Tournament Semi-finals	Zhoukou, China	TKO (Knee to the Body)	2	1:25
2016-03-12	Win	(Armenia) Marat Grigorian	Glory 28: Paris - Lightweight Contender Tournament, Final	Paris, France	Decision (unanimous)	3	3:00
Wins the Glory Lightweight Contender Tournament.
2016-03-12	Win	(Georgia (country)) Davit Kiria	Glory 28: Paris - Lightweight Contender Tournament, Semi-finals	Paris, France	Decision (unanimous)	3	3:00
2016-01-23	Win	(Ukraine) Enriko Gogokhia	Kunlun Fight 37 - World MAX Tournament 2015, Final	Sanya, China	Ext. R Decision (3-1)	4	3:00
Wins the Kunlun Fight World MAX Tournament Champion.
2016-01-23	Win	(Thailand) Superbon Banchamek	Kunlun Fight 37 - World MAX Tournament 2015, Semi-finals	Sanya, China	KO (Right Hook)	2	0:39
2015-12-19	Win	(Armenia) Marat Grigorian	Kunlun Fight 35 - World MAX Tournament 2015 Final 8	Luoyang, China	Decision (Majority)	3	3:00
Qualified to Kunlun Fight 2015 70kg World MAX Tournament Final.
2015-11-06	Lost	(Netherlands) Robin van Roosmalen	Glory 25: Milan	Monza, Italy	Decision (unanimous)	5	3:00
For the Glory Lightweight Championship.
2015-09-28	Win	(Spain) Jonay Risco	Kunlun Fight 31 - World MAX Tournament 2015 Final 16	Bangkok, Thailand	Decision (unanimous)	3	3:00
Qualified to Kunlun Fight 2015 70kg World MAX Tournament Final 8.
2015-08-08	Win	(Belgium) Yassin Baitar	The Fight League Final (70 kg KB rules)	Tangier, Morocco	KO (Left Hook)	2	3:00
Wins The Fight League 70kg Tournament.
2015-08-08	Win	(Morocco) Walid Hamid	The Fight League Semi-finals (70 kg KB rules)	Tangier, Morocco	TKO (Cut)	2	3:00
2015-08-08	Win	(Iraq) Emad Kedyar	The Fight League Quarter-finals (70 kg KB rules)	Tangier, Morocco	Decision	3	3:00
2015-06-05	Win	(Canada) Josh Jauncey	Glory 22: Lille - Lightweight Contender Tournament, Final	Lille, France	Decision (unanimous)	3	3:00
Wins the Glory Lightweight Contender Tournament.
2015-06-05	Win	(Georgia (country)) Davit Kiria	Glory 22: Lille - Lightweight Contender Tournament, Semi-finals	Lille, France	KO (Knee to the Body)	2	2:09
2015-05-02	Loss	(France) Dylan Salvador	Kunlun Fight 24	Verona, Italy	Decision (unanimous)	3	3:00
2015-02-07	Win	(France) Crice Boussoukou	La Nuit des Titans 2015 – 70 kg	Tours, France	Decision	5	3:00
2015-01-03	Win	(Netherlands) Andy Souwer	Kunlun Fight 15 - World MAX 2015 Group A Tournament Final	Nanjing, China	Decision	3	3:00
Qualified to Kunlun Fight 2015 70kg World MAX Tournament Final 16.
2015-01-03	Win	(Netherlands) Murthel Groenhart	Kunlun Fight 15 - World MAX 2015 Group A Tournament Semi-finals	Nanjing, China	KO (Left High Kick)	3	2:49
2014-12-13	Win	(France) Dylan Salvador	Victory 2, K-1 Rules	Levallois, France	Decision	3	3:00
2014-11-22	Win	(France) Abdellah Ezbiri	La 21ème Nuit des Champions, Final	Marseille, France	TKO (Left Low Kicks)	2	
Wins NDC K-1 Rules -70 kg Tournament Title.
2014-11-22	Win	(France) Abdallah Mabel	La 21ème Nuit des Champions, Semi-finals	Marseille, France	Decision	3	3:00
2014-10-28	Win	(Thailand) Sorgraw Petchyindee	Petchyindee, Lumpinee Stadium	Bangkok, Thailand	TKO (Referee Stop./Left High Kick)	4	
Won vacant Lumpinee Welterweight title (147 lbs) and defended Thailand (PAT) Welterweight title (147 lbs)
2014-07-06	Win	(Russia) Batyr Ruskorkoloev	Max Muay Thai 8	Pattaya, Thailand	TKO (Elbow)	2	
2014-06-14	Win	(France) Johann Fauveau	Best of Siam 5	Paris, France	KO (Left Elbow)	2	
2014-04-05	Win	(Morocco) Mohamed Khamal	Legend 3: Pour Homme	Milan, Italy	Decision (unanimous)	3	3:00
2014-01-25	Win	(Belarus) Chingiz Allazov	Thai Boxe Mania	Turin, Italy	Ext. R Decision	4	3:00
2014-01-03	Win	(Thailand) Wanchalerm Aooddonmuang	Yokkao 6	Pattaya, Thailand	Decision	3	3:00
2013-12-14	Win	(Australia) Kym Johnson	Rebellion Muaythai VI	Melbourne, Australia	Decision (Unanimous)	5	3:00
2013-11-23	Win	(Thailand) Dejrit Poptheeratham	Muay Thai Thailand Welterweight Championship	Bangkok, Thailand	Decision	5	3:00
Defended Thailand (PAT) Welterweight title (147 lbs).
2013-09-07	Win	(France) Mickael Piscitello	Millennium Team Fight	La Réunion	KO (Elbow)	2	
2013-08-10	Win	(England) Jordan Watson	MAX Muay Thai 3	Zhengzhou, China	Decision	3	3:00
2013-06-29	Win	(Germany) Juri Kehl	MAX Muay Thai 2	Pattaya, Thailand	Decision	3	3:00
2013-04-20	Loss	(Ukraine) Enriko Gogokhia	Oktagon 2013	Milan, Italy	Decision (Split)	3	3:00
2013-03-29	Win	(Thailand) Dejrit Poptheeratham	Toyota Vigo Marathon Tournament 2013, Final	Udon Thani, Thailand	Decision	3	3:00
Wins Toyota Vigo Marathon Tournament title (154 lbs).
2013-03-29	Win	(Thailand) Petchmankong Gaiyanghaadao	Toyota Vigo Marathon Tournament 2013, Semi-final	Udon Thani, Thailand	Decision	3	3:00
2013-03-29	Win	(Thailand) Petsanguan Sor Yupinda	Toyota Vigo Marathon Tournament 2013, Quarter-final	Udon Thani, Thailand	KO	1	
2013-02-14	Win	(France) Fabio Pinca	Best of Siam 3	Paris, France	Decision (unanimous)	5	3:00
2013-01-25	Win	(Thailand) Phetasawin Seatranferry	Muaythai Gala	Ko Samui, Thailand	KO	2	
2013-01-05	Win	(Thailand) Puengluang Sitpupantu	“1–King”70Kg Tournament, Final	Koh Chang, Thailand	TKO (Referee Stop./Left High Kick)	1	1:18
Wins “1–King” 4-Man Tournament (70kg)
2013-01-05	Win	(Cambodia) Sen Bunthen	“1–King”70Kg Tournament, Semi-final	Koh Chang, Thailand	Decision	3	3:00
2012-09-25	Win	(Thailand) Petchmankong Gaiyanghaadaogym	Petchyindee, Lumpinee Stadium	Bangkok, Thailand	Decision	5	3:00
Wins Thailand (PAT) Welterweight title (147 lbs).
2012-08-31	Win	(Thailand) Prakaysaeng Gaiyanghaadaogym	Wanweraphon, Lumpinee Stadium	Bangkok, Thailand	Decision	5	3:00
2012-07-31	Win	(Thailand) Kamlaipetch S. Somnuek	Muaythai Gala	Hua Mak, Thailand	Decision	3	
2012-06-24	Win	(France) Crice Boussoukou	Channel 11 "Thailand vs. Russia"	Pattaya, Thailand	Decision	3	3:00
2012-05-31	Win	(Cambodia) Pich Seiha	Toyota Vigo Marathon Tournament 2012, Final	Chonburi, Thailand	Decision	3	2:00
Wins Toyota Vigo Marathon Tournament title (147 lbs).
2012-05-31	Win	(Brazil) Leo Monteiro	Toyota Vigo Marathon Tournament 2012, Semi-final	Chonburi, Thailand	Decision	4	2:00
2012-05-31	Win	(Kenya) Leonard Nganga	Toyota Vigo Marathon Tournament 2012, Quarter-final	Chonburi, Thailand	Decision	3	2:00
2012-04-24	Win	(Thailand) Petasawin Seatransferry	Wanwirapon, Lumpinee Stadium	Bangkok, Thailand	Decision	5	3:00
2012-01-31	Win	(Thailand) Sirimongkol Sitanupap	Petchyindee, Lumpinee Stadium	Bangkok, Thailand	TKO (Cut)	4	
2011-12-08	Win	(France) Fares Bechar	A-1 WCC	Lyon, France	TKO	4	
2011-07-23	Loss	(Thailand) Iquezang Kor.Rungthanakeat	Fuktien Group Tournament, Omnoi Stadium	Bangkok, Thailand	TKO (Broken Collar Bone)	5	
Fight was for Fuktien Group Tournament title (147 lbs) and Omnoi Stadium Welterweight title (147 lbs).
2011-06-18	Win	(Thailand) Samranchai 96 Peenang	Fuktien Group Tournament, Omnoi Stadium	Bangkok, Thailand	Decision	5	3:00
2011-05-14	Win	(Thailand) Iquezang Kor.Rungthanakeat	Fuktien Group Tournament, Omnoi Stadium	Bangkok, Thailand	Decision	5	3:00
2011-04-16	Win	(Thailand) Singmanee Kaewsamrit	Fuktien Group Tournament, Omnoi Stadium	Bangkok, Thailand	Decision	5	3:00
2011-03-12	Draw	(Thailand) Songniyom Pumphanmuang	Fuktien Group Tournament, Omnoi Stadium	Bangkok, Thailand	Draw	5	3:00
2011-02-04	Win	(Thailand) Petchmankong Kaiyanghadaogym	Petchpiya, Lumpinee Stadium	Bangkok, Thailand	Decision	5	3:00
2011-01-13	Win	(Thailand) Eakpracha Meenayothin	Wanmitchai, Rajadamnern Stadium	Bangkok, Thailand	Decision	5	3:00
2010-11-26	Win	(France) Damien Alamos	La Nuit des Champions 2010	Marseilles, France	Decision	5	3:00
Wins "Nuit des Champions" Muaythai belt (-64 kg).
2010-10-27	Loss	(Thailand) Buckjoe Kiatchuchai		Ubon Ratchathani, Thailand	Decision	5	3:00
2010-09-24	Win	(Thailand) Tuantong Pumphanmuang	Pumphanmoung, Lumpinee Stadium	Bangkok, Thailand	Decision	5	3:00
2010-08-31	Draw	(Thailand) Tuantong Pumphanmuang	Pumphanmuang, Lumpinee Stadium	Bangkok, Thailand	Draw	5	3:00
2010-08-03	Loss	(Thailand) Pansak Look Bor Kor	Petchyindee, Lumpinee Stadium	Bangkok, Thailand	Decision	5	3:00
2010-07-16	Win	(Thailand) Aranchai Kiatpatrpan	Fairtex, Lumpinee Stadium	Bangkok, Thailand	KO (Left Elbow)	3	1:58
2010-06-01	Loss	(Thailand) Pansak Look Bor Kor	Siangsawangpanpa, Lumpinee Stadium	Bangkok, Thailand	Decision	5	3:00
2010-03-12	Win	(Thailand) Panpecht Ch. N. Patalung	Petchyindee, Lumpinee Stadium	Bangkok, Thailand	Decision	5	3:00
2010-01-30	Win	(Thailand) Anuwat Kaewsamrit	La Nuit des Titans, Final	Tours, France	Decision (Unanimous)	3	3:00
Wins "Nuit des Titans" 4 men Muaythai tournament title (141 lbs).
2010-01-30	Win	(France) Fabio Pinca	La Nuit des Titans, Semi-final	Tours, France	Decision	4	3:00
2009-12-24	Loss	(Thailand) Yodtuanthong Wiramanokul	CP Freshmart Marathon Tournament, Quarter-final	Thailand	Decision	3	3:00
2009-12-04	Win	(Thailand) Jaenrop Sakhomsil	Praianun, Lumpinee Stadium	Bangkok, Thailand	Decision	5	3:00
2009-11-13	Win	(Thailand) Attachai Longbeachgarden	Siangsawangpanpa, Lumpinee Stadium	Bangkok, Thailand	TKO	4	
2009-10-06	Loss	(Thailand) Attachai Longbeachgarden	Praianun, Lumpinee Stadium	Bangkok, Thailand	Decision	5	3:00
2009-08-18	Loss	(Thailand) F-16 Rachanon	Praianun, Lumpinee Stadium	Bangkok, Thailand	Decision	5	3:00
2009-07-24	Win	(Thailand) Wansotsai Sit Jor	Fairtex, Lumpinee Stadium	Bangkok, Thailand	TKO	3	
2009-06-12	Win	(Thailand) Payasua Gardenseaview	Praianun, Lumpinee Stadium	Bangkok, Thailand	Decision	5	3:00
2009-05-15	Win	(Thailand) Virayuthlek Himalaigym	Petchyindee, Lumpinee Stadium	Bangkok, Thailand	Decision	5	3:00
2009-03-21	Win	(Thailand) Petchaiphum Bangkok2007	Krikkrai, Lumpinee Stadium	Bangkok, Thailand	Decision	5	3:00
2009-02-24	Win	(Thailand) Petchaiphum Por.Jaroenchai	Por. Pramuk, Lumpinee Stadium	Bangkok, Thailand	Decision	5	3:00
2008-10-28	Loss	(Thailand) Palungtip Kor Sapaothong	Petchyindee, Lumpinee Stadium	Bangkok, Thailand	Decision	5	3:00
2008-09-03	Win	(Thailand) Saengartid Sor Sommay	Sor Sommai, Lumpinee Stadium	Bangkok, Thailand	Decision	5	3:00
2008-07-25	Loss	(Thailand) Weerayut Lookphetnoi	Parianan, Lumpinee Stadium	Bangkok, Thailand	Decision	5	3:00
2008-06-04	Loss	(Thailand) Dungkungwan Sor Jitpatthana	Sor Sommai, Rajadamnern Stadium	Bangkok, Thailand	Decision	5	3:00
2008-04-02	Win	(Thailand) Natthapon Por Puanruamsang	Daorungprabat, Rajadamnern Stadium	Bangkok, Thailand	Decision	5	3:00
2008-03-05	Win	(Thailand) Nawapon Por Puenruamsang	Daorungprabat, Rajadamnern Stadium	Bangkok, Thailand	Decision	5	3:00
2008-02-13	Win	(Thailand) Saeksan Or. Kwanmuang	Sor Sommai, Rajadamnern Stadium	Bangkok, Thailand	Decision	5	3:00
2007-12-13	Loss	(Thailand) Siankeng Jor Nopparat	Daorungprabat, Rajadamnern Stadium	Bangkok, Thailand	Decision	5	3:00
2007-06-19	Win	(Thailand) Rangphet Phetcergus	Wanboonya, Lumpinee Stadium	Bangkok, Thailand	Decision	5	3:00
2007-05-22	Win	(Thailand) Parinyachat Sitkamnanliew	Wanboonya, Lumpinee Stadium	Bangkok, Thailand	Decision	5	3:00
2007-01-19	Loss	(Thailand) Nonthachailek Himalaigym	Wanboonya, Lumpinee Stadium	Bangkok, Thailand	TKO	3	
2006-12-26	Win	(Thailand) Wanday Phetsirigym	Phetpiya, Lumpinee Stadium	Bangkok, Thailand	Decision	5	3:00
2006-12-02	Win	(Thailand) Chalawan Kor Sommay	Lumpinee Krikkrai, Lumpinee Stadium	Bangkok, Thailand	Decision	5	3:00
2006-06-03	Win	(Thailand) Phetpoowiang Sitjomtri	Lumpinee Krikkrai, Lumpinee Stadium	Bangkok, Thailand	Decision	5	3:00
2006-05-06	Win	(Thailand) Seanvised P.Pongsawang	Lumpinee Krikkrai, Lumpinee Stadium	Bangkok, Thailand	TKO	3	
Legend: Win Loss Draw/No contest Notes

== See also ==
- List of male kickboxers
