= Elvis Gashi =

American kickboxer

- Born: December 12, 1992 (age 33); Peja, Yugoslavia (nowadays Kosovo)
- Other names: Super
- Nationality: Kosovar
- Height: 1.75 m (5 ft 9 in)
- Weight: 70 kg (154 lb; 11 st)
- Division: Lightweight
- Style: Kickboxing
- Stance: Southpaw
- Fighting out of: New York, United States
- Years active: 2014 - present

Kickboxing record
- Total: 25
- Wins: 23
- By knockout: 11
- Losses: 2
- By knockout: 1

Other information
- Boxing record from BoxRec

Elvis Gashi (born December 12, 1992) is a Kosovar kickboxer currently signed with Glory, where he is the former Lightweight title challenger.

== Kickboxing career ==
=== Early career ===
Gashi made his professional debut against Jeremy Carper at CSC 39. He won the fight by a first-round knockout. He would go on to win his next his next six fights, defeating Andre Shuler twice, Ben Peak, Eric Olsen and Michael Stevens by stoppage, and Chris Lukusa by decision.

=== Glory ===
Gashi made his promotional debut against Josh Jauncey at Glory 43: New York. He beat Jauncey by a third-round TKO. He was next scheduled to fight Nate Richardson at Glory 48: New York, and won the fight by unanimous decision. Gashi would go on to string together three more victories, defeating William Goldie-Galloway and Nick Chasteen by decision, as well as Justin Houghton by a first round knockout.

Gashi's five fight winning streak earned him the chance to challenge to Lightweight kingpin Marat Grigorian at Glory 73. Grigorian won the fight in the fifth round, by way of knockout.

Gashi was scheduled to fight Tyjani Beztati at Glory 78: Rotterdam for the vacant Glory Lightweight Championship. He lost the fight by unanimous decision.

== Titles and accomplishments ==
=== Amateur ===
- 4x Kosovo National champion
- IKF USA Champion

=== Professional ===
- Glory upset of the year 2017
- Fastest knockout in Glory kickboxing lightweight history (23 sec)

== Kickboxing record ==
Kickboxing record
23 wins (12 (T) KOs), 2 losses
Date	Result	Opponent	Event	Location	Method	Round	Time
2021-09-04	Loss	(Morocco) Tyjani Beztati	Glory 78: Rotterdam	Rotterdam, Netherlands	Decision (unanimous)	5	3:00
For the vacant Glory Lightweight Championship.
2019-12-07	Loss	(Armenia) Marat Grigorian	Glory 73: Shenzhen	Shenzhen, China	KO (punches)	5	2:03
For the Glory Lightweight Championship.
2019-07-05	Win	(United States) Justin Houghton	Glory 67: Orlando	Orlando, United States	KO (body kick)	1	0:23
2018-07-20	Win	(United States) Nick Chasteen	Glory 55: New York	New York City, New York, USA	Decision (unanimous)	3	3:00
2018-06-02	Win	(United Kingdom) William Goldie-Galloway	Glory 54: Birmingham	Birmingham, United Kingdom	Decision (unanimous)	3	3:00
2017-12-01	Win	(United States) Nate Richardson	Glory 48: New York	New York City, New York, USA	Decision (unanimous)	3	3:00
2017-07-14	Win	(Canada) Josh Jauncey	Glory 43: New York	New York City, New York, USA	TKO (referee stoppage/punches)	2	2:59
2017-03-03	Win	(Switzerland) Chris Lukusa	Friday Night Fights	United States	Decision	3	3:00
2016-10-14	Win	(United States) Michael Stevens	Friday Night Fights	United States	TKO (punches)	3	2:15
2016-08-19	Win	(United States) Andre Shuler	Friday Night Fights	United States	KO	1	2:49
2015-12-11	Win	(United States) Eric Olsen	Friday Night Fights	United States	KO	1	
2015-07-17	Win	(United States) Ben Peak	Combat Zone 54	United States	TKO (doctor stoppage)	1	1:36
2014-06-13	Win	(United States) Mike Santiago	Combat at the Capitale 33	New York City, New York, USA	TKO (referee stoppage)	1	1:51
2014-04-04	Win	(United States) Andre Shuler	Combat At The Capitale 32	New York City, New York, USA	KO (right hook)	1	1:51
2014-03-22	Win	(United States) Jeremy Carper	Combat Sports Challenge 39	Richmond, Virginia, United States	TKO	2	1:09
Legend: Win Loss Draw/no contest Notes

== See also ==
- List of male kickboxers
