= Marat Grigorian =

Armenian-Belgian kickboxer (born 1991)

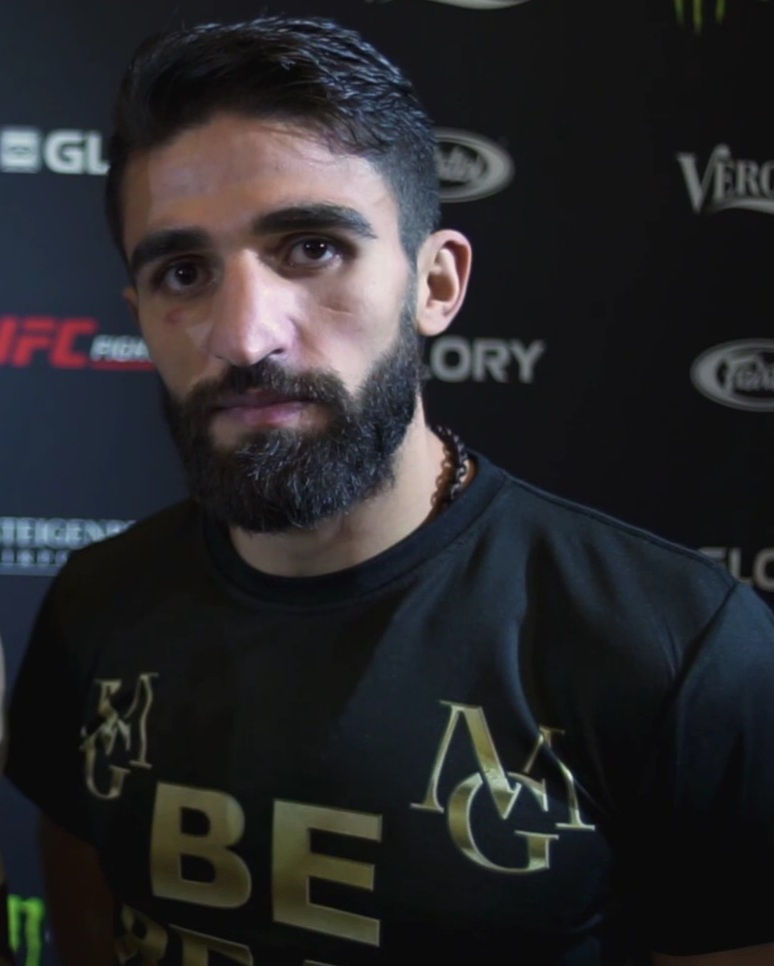
- Grigorian in 2018
- Born: Marat Grigorian; 29 May 1991 (age 35); Talin, Armenian SSR, Soviet Union
- Nationality: Armenian; Belgian
- Height: 1.76 m (5 ft 9 1/2 in)
- Weight: 70 kg (150 lb; 11 st)
- Division: Lightweight; Middleweight
- Reach: 72.8 in (185 cm)
- Style: Kickboxing, Muay Thai
- Fighting out of: Antwerp, Belgium
- Team: Bulldog Gym (until 2015); Hemmers Gym (2014–present)
- Trainer: Nick Hemmers
- Years active: 2007–present

Kickboxing record
- Total: 87
- Wins: 71
- By knockout: 37
- Losses: 14
- Draws: 1
- No contests: 1

Other information
- Website: maratgrigorian.com
- Last updated on: 12 April 2014

Marat Grigorian (Armenian: Մարատ Գրիգորյան; born 29 May 1991) is an Armenian-Belgian kickboxer currently signed to ONE Championship, where he competes in the featherweight division. Grigorian previously competed for Glory. He is a former Glory Lightweight Champion. He is famous for his technical aggressive fighting style and knockout power. Combat Press ranks him as the #2 lightweight and #4 pound-for-pound kickboxer in the world.

== Background ==
Marat Grigorian was born to Armenian parents on 29 May 1991 in Talin, Soviet Armenia and has three older sisters. The family moved to Germany when he was three years old, but were sent back to Armenia after three years in the country. After gathering funds by working multiple simultaneous odd jobs, the parents relocated the family to Antwerp, Belgium, when Marat was nine. In Belgium, Marat started training kickboxing in a nearby gym in his early youth years.

== Kickboxing career ==
=== Glory ===
Marat trains at Hemmers Gym in the Netherlands. He has established himself as one of the rising stars of the Dutch circuit around the 70 kg weight category. According to Simon Rutz, the promoter of It's Showtime, Grigorian has a potential to be the next big star.

In 2011, Grigorian fought for the inaugural It's Showtime 73MAX world title, losing a close unanimous decision to Yohan Lidon. Grigorian did, however, become the youngest fighter to ever challenge for a Showtime title, at the age of 18.

He was set to face Mohamed Khamal at Glory 2: Brussels in Brussels, Belgium. However, Khamal pulled out of this bout citing personal issues and was replaced by Alex Vogel. He defeated Vogel via TKO due to low kicks in the second round.

Grigorian fought Chingiz Allazov at Glory 7: Milan in Milan, Italy on 20 April 2013. The bout ended in a no contest late in round one when Allazov was cut above the nose by an unintentional elbow. Grigorian won a rematch via decision on 14 December 2013.

He lost to Robin van Roosmalen via split decision in the co-main event of Glory 15: Istanbul in Istanbul, Turkey on 12 April 2014.

Grigorian took part in the Topking lightweight tournament, the quarterfinals of which were held at Topking World Series 2 on 15 November 2014. Despite beating Abraham Roqueñi by decision at this event and Seyedisa Alamdarnezam by decision at Topking World Series 3 on 20 December 2014, he later withdrew from the tournament.

Grigorian competed in the eight-man grand prix at the K-1 World GP 2015 -70kg Championship Tournament held in Tokyo, Japan on 4 July 2015. He defeated Yoichi Yamazaki and Makihira Keita by second-round knockouts in the quarter-finals and semi-finals, respectively, and defeated Jordan Pikeur by a first-round knockout in the finals to win the K-1 -70kg Championship.

In 2016, Grigorian fought Sitthichai Sitsongpeenong twice, with the first bout taking place in the Glory Lightweight Contender Tournament finals and the second bout being for the Glory Lightweight Championship held by Sitthichai. Grigorian lost both bouts by close decisions.

After twice falling short against Sitthichai, Grigorian faced Djime Coulibaly at Glory 30: Los Angeles on 13 May 2016. He won the fight by a first-round knockout, flooring Coulibaly with a head kick. Grigorian returned to China for his next fight, as he was booked to face Steve Moxon at The Legend of Emei 9 on 5 June 2016. He won the fight by a first-round technical knockout. Grigorian's next bout likewise took place under the Legend of Emei promotional banner, as he faced Mohamed El-Mir at their tenth event on 9 July 2016. He won the fight by a first-round technical knockout, extending his stoppage streak to three consecutive fights.

Grigorian was expected to face Hysni Beqiri in the co-main event of Glory 39: Brussels on 25 March 2017. Beqiri later withdrew for undisclosed reasons and was replaced by Anton Petrov. He won the fight by a second-round technical knockout. Grigorian faced Antonio Gomez at Glory 42: Paris on 10 June 2017. He won the fight by a second-round knockout.

Grigorian faced Jomthong Chuwattana, in a qualification bout for the Kunlun Fight lightweight tournament, at Kunlun Fight 65 - World MAX 2017 Final 16 on 27 August 2017. He won the fight by a second-round knockout. Grigorian faced Mohamed Mezouari in the quarterfinals at Kunlun Fight 67 - World MAX 2017 Final 8 on 12 November 2017. He won the fight by unanimous decision. Grigorian faced Dzianis Zuev in the penultimate bout of the tournament at Kunlun Fight 69 - World MAX 2017 on 4 February 2018. He once again won by unanimous decision. Grigorian faced Superbon Banchamek in the finals at Kunlun Fight 69 - World MAX 2017 on very same day. He won the fight by a first-round knockout, needing just 29 seconds to stop Superbon.

After beating Liu Xu by unanimous decision at Glory 54: Birmingham on 2 June 2018, Grigorian was booked to face Sitthichai Sitsongpeenong for the fourth time in his career, with Sitthichai's Glory Lightweight Championship on the line. Sitthichai once again prevailed, winning the fight by split decision.

In a fifth fight with Sitthichai Sitsongpeenong, Marat Grigorian defeated him at Glory 65 to win the title of Glory Lightweight Champion. Grigorian knocked Sitthichai down in the second round.

Grigorian made his first title defense against Tyjani Beztati at Glory 69: Düsseldorf on 12 October 2019. He won the fight by unanimous decision. Grigorian made his second and final title defense against the undefeated Elvis Gashi at Glory 73: Shenzhen on 7 December 2019. He retained the title by a fifth-round knockout.

=== ONE Championship ===
On 23 August 2020, news surfaced that Grigorian had signed with ONE Championship. He made his promotional debut against Ivan Kondratev at ONE Championship: Big Bang on 4 December 2020. After getting knocked down by Kondratev in the first round, Grigorian came back to win via second-round knockout.

Grigorian was scheduled to face Andy Souwer at ONE Championship: First Strike on 15 October 2021 in the quarterfinals of the ONE Featherweight Kickboxing World Grand Prix. He won the fight by second-round technical knockout.

Grigorian was expected to face Chingiz Allazov in the semifinals of the ONE Featherweight Kickboxing World Grand Prix at ONE Championship: Only the Brave on 28 January 2022. He withdrew from the bout after a positive COVID-19 test.

Grigorian challenged the reigning ONE Featherweight kickboxing champion Superbon Banchamek at ONE: X on 25 March 2022. He lost the fight by unanimous decision.

Grigorian was expected to face Tayfun Özcan at ONE on Prime Video 2 on 30 September 2022. On 21 September, Özcan was rescheduled to challenge the reigning ONE Kickboxing Featherweight champion Superbon Singha Mawynn, while Grigorian was booked to face Jamal Yusupov. As both Superbon and Yusupov failed the pre-fight medical, Grigorian and Özcan were once again schedule to face each other on 29 September. Grigorian won the fight by unanimous decision.

Grigorian challenged Chingiz Allazov for the ONE Featherweight Kickboxing World Championship in a trilogy bout at ONE Fight Night 13 on 4 August 2023. He twice faced Allazov prior to this fight, going to a no contest in their first meeting and winning the second one by unanimous decision. He lost the fight by unanimous decision.

Grigorian faced Sitthichai Sitsongpeenong at ONE 165 on 28 January 2024. He won the fight by a third-round knockout.

Grigorian faced Superbon Singha Mawynn for the interim ONE Featherweight Kickboxing World Championship at ONE Friday Fights 58 on 5 April 2024. He lost the fight by unanimous decision.

Grigorian faced Abdelali Zahidi on 20 December 2024, at ONE Friday Fights 92. He won the fight via knockout in round two.

Grigorian was scheduled to face Kaito Ono on 23 March 2025, at ONE 172. At the weigh-ins, Grigorian weighed in at 155.75 pounds, 0.75 pounds over the featherweight limit. Subsequently, the bout was cancelled after Kaito declined the catchweight bout.

Grigorian faced the former K-1 Super Lightweight champion Rukiya Anpo at ONE 173 on 16 November 2025.

== Personal life ==
Marat and his teammate Harut Grigorian are often mistaken to be brothers, but both have confirmed that they are good friends but not related.

== Titles and accomplishments ==
- Glory
  - 2019 Glory Lightweight Champion
    - Two successful title defenses
- Kunlun Fight
  - Kunlun Fight World Max 2017 Tournament Champion
- K-1
  - K-1 Super Welterweight (-70kg) Champion
  - K-1 World GP 2015 -70kg Championship Tournament winner
- WRSA
  - WRSA -73 kg World Champion
- CombatPress.com
  - 2018 Knockout of the Year vs. Superbon Banchamek
  - 2019 Fight of the Year vs. Sitthichai Sitsongpeenong

== Kickboxing record ==
Kickboxing record
71 wins (37 (T)KOs), 14 losses, 1 draw, 1 no contest
Date	Result	Opponent	Event	Location	Method	Round	Time
		(Japan) Masaaki Noiri					
ONE Samurai Featherweight Kickboxing Tournament Final.
2026-08-07	Win	(Russia) Mamuka Usubyan	ONE: The Inner Circle 25	Bangkok, Thailand	Decision (unanimous)	3	3:00
ONE Samurai Featherweight Kickboxing Tournament Quarterfinal.
2026-04-29	Win	(Japan) Kaito Ono	ONE Samurai 1	Tokyo, Japan	KO (punch)	1	1:51
2025-11-16	Win	(Japan) Rukiya Anpo	ONE 173	Tokyo, Japan	Decision (unanimous)	3	3:00
2024-12-20	Win	(Morocco) Abdelali Zahidi	ONE Friday Fights 92	Bangkok, Thailand	TKO (punches)	2	2:36
2024-04-05	Loss	(Thailand) Superbon Singha Mawynn	ONE Friday Fights 58	Bangkok, Thailand	Decision (unanimous)	5	3:00
For the interim ONE Featherweight Kickboxing World Championship.
2024-01-28	Win	(Thailand) Sitthichai Sitsongpeenong	ONE 165	Tokyo, Japan	KO (knee + punch to the body)	3	1:20
2023-08-05	Loss	(Belarus) Chingiz Allazov	ONE Fight Night 13	Bangkok, Thailand	Decision (unanimous)	5	3:00
For the ONE Featherweight Kickboxing World Championship.
2022-10-01	Win	(Turkey) Tayfun Ozcan	ONE on Prime Video 2	Kallang, Singapore	Decision (unanimous)	3	3:00
2022-03-25	Loss	(Thailand) Superbon Banchamek	ONE: X	Kallang, Singapore	Decision (unanimous)	5	3:00
For the ONE Featherweight Kickboxing World Championship.
2021-10-15	Win	(Netherlands) Andy Souwer	ONE Championship: First Strike	Kallang, Singapore	TKO (leg injury)	2	2:26
Kickboxing Featherweight Grand Prix Quarter Final
2020-12-04	Win	(Russia) Ivan Kondratiev	ONE Championship: Big Bang	Kallang, Singapore	KO (left hook to the body)	2	1:52
2019-12-07	Win	(United States) Elvis Gashi	Glory 73: Shenzhen	Shenzhen, China	KO (punches)	5	2:03
Defends the Glory Lightweight Championship.
2019-10-12	Win	(Morocco) Tyjani Beztati	Glory 69: Düsseldorf	Düsseldorf, Germany	Decision (unanimous)	5	3:00
Defends the Glory Lightweight Championship.
2019-05-17	Win	(Thailand) Sitthichai Sitsongpeenong	Glory 65: Utrecht	Utrecht, Netherlands	Decision (unanimous)	5	3:00
Wins the Glory Lightweight Championship.
2018-12-08	Win	(Angola) Christian Baya	Glory 62: Rotterdam	Rotterdam, Netherlands	Decision (split)	3	3:00
2018-08-25	Loss	(Thailand) Sitthichai Sitsongpeenong	Glory 57: Shenzhen	Shenzhen, China	Decision (split)	5	3:00
For the Glory Lightweight Championship.
2018-06-02	Win	(China) Liu Xu	Glory 54: Birmingham	Birmingham, England	Decision (unanimous)	3	3:00
2018-02-04	Win	(Thailand) Superbon Banchamek	Kunlun Fight 69 - World MAX 2017, Final	Guiyang, China	KO (punches)	1	0:29
Wins the Kunlun Fight World MAX Tournament Champion.
2018-02-04	Win	(Belarus) Dzianis Zuev	Kunlun Fight 69 - World MAX 2017, Semi Finals	Guiyang, China	Decision (unanimous)	3	3:00
2017-11-12	Win	(Morocco) Mohamed Mezouari	Kunlun Fight 67 - World MAX 2017 Final 8	Sanya, China	Decision (unanimous)	3	3:00
Qualified to Kunlun Fight 2017 70kg World Max Tournament Final 4.
2017-08-27	Win	(Thailand) Jomthong Chuwattana	Kunlun Fight 65 - World MAX 2017 Final 16	Qingdao, China	KO (right cross)	2	2:56
Qualified to Kunlun Fight 2017 70kg World Max Tournament Final 8.
2017-06-10	Win	(Spain) Antonio Gomez	Glory 42: Paris	Paris, France	KO (knee to the body)	2	2:02
2017-03-25	Win	(Bulgaria) Anton Petrov	Glory 39: Brussels	Brussels, Belgium	TKO	2	1:09
2016-12-10	Loss	(Thailand) Sitthichai Sitsongpeenong	Glory 36: Oberhausen	Oberhausen, Germany	Decision (split)	5	3:00
For the Glory Lightweight Championship.
2016-07-09	Win	(Denmark) Mohamed El-Mir	The Legend of Emei 10	Nanchong, China	TKO (referee stoppage/right high kick)	1	1:50
2016-06-05	Win	(Australia) Steve Moxon	The Legend of Emei 9	Chengdu, China	TKO (referee stoppage)	1	2:40
2016-05-13	Win	(France) Djime Coulibaly	Glory 30: Los Angeles	Ontario, California	KO (head kick)	1	1:56
2016-03-12	Loss	(Thailand) Sitthichai Sitsongpeenong	Glory 28: Paris - Lightweight Contender Tournament, Final	Paris, France	Decision (unanimous)	3	3:00
For the Glory Lightweight Contender Tournament.
2016-03-12	Win	(Russia) Anatoly Moiseev	Glory 28: Paris - Lightweight Contender Tournament, Semi Finals	Paris, France	Decision (unanimous)	3	3:00
2015-12-19	Loss	(Thailand) Sitthichai Sitsongpeenong	Kunlun Fight 35 - World MAX 2015 Final 8	Luoyang, China	Decision (majority)	3	3:00
2015-07-04	Win	(Netherlands) Jordann Pikeur	K-1 World GP 2015 -70kg Championship Tournament, Final	Tokyo, Japan	KO (punches)	1	1:24
Wins the K-1 -70kg Championship.
2015-07-04	Win	(Japan) Makihira Keita	K-1 World GP 2015 -70kg Championship Tournament, Semi Finals	Tokyo, Japan	KO (left body hook)	2	2:00
2015-07-04	Win	(Japan) Yoichi Yamazaki	K-1 World GP 2015 -70kg Championship Tournament, Quarter Finals	Tokyo, Japan	KO (left high kick)	2	0:51
2015-06-05	Loss	(Ukraine) Serhiy Adamchuk	Glory 22: Lille - Lightweight Contender Tournament, Reserve Match	Lille, France,	Decision (unanimous)	3	3:00
2015-05-23	Win	(Greece) Nikos Gikas	VFC 2 °Coskun promotions°	Antwerp, Belgium,	KO (right hook)	1	0:30
Wins the WRSA -73kg World Championship.
2015-04-12	Loss	(Thailand) Yodsanklai Fairtex	Kunlun Fight 22	Changde, China	Decision	3	3:00
2015-02-01	Win	(Italy) Fernando Calzetta	Kunlun Fight 19 - Middleweight Tournament, Final	Guangzhou, China	TKO (ref. stoppage)	1	
Qualified to Kunlun fight 2015 70kg World MAX Tournament Final 16.
2015-02-01	Win	(Thailand) Aikpracha Meenayothin	Kunlun Fight 19 - Middleweight Tournament, Semi Finals	Guangzhou, China	KO (right hook)	2	
2014-12-20	Win	(Iran) Seyedisa Alamdarnezam	Topking World Series 3 – 70 kg Tournament, Quarter Finals	Hong Kong, China	Decision (unanimous)	3	3:00
2014-11-15	Win	(Spain) Abraham Roqueñi	Topking World Series 2 – 70 kg Tournament, Final 16	Paris, France	Decision	3	3:00
2014-04-12	Loss	(Netherlands) Robin van Roosmalen	Glory 15: Istanbul	Istanbul, Turkey	Decision (split)	3	3:00
2013-12-14	Win	(Belarus) Chingiz Allazov	Victory	Levallois-Perret, France	Decision	3	3:00
2013-04-20	Nc	(Belarus) Chingiz Allazov	Glory 7: Milan	Milan, Italy	NC (Allazov cut by illegal elbow)	1	
2012-10-06	Win	(Germany) Alex Vogel	Glory 2: Brussels	Brussels, Belgium	TKO (right low kick)	2	
2012-06-30	Win	(Morocco) Aziz Kallah	Music Hall & BFN Group present: It's Showtime 57 & 58	Brussels, Belgium	Decision (unanimous)	3	3:00
2012-04-28	Win	(Netherlands) Kenneth van Eesvelde	Rocky Gym Kickboxing Gala	Maldegem, Belgium	KO	1	
2011-09-24	Win	(Morocco) Yassin Baitar	BFN Group & Music Hall presents: It's Showtime "Fast & Furious 70MAX"	Brussels, Belgium	Decision (split)	3	3:00
2011-05-14	Loss	(France) Yohan Lidon	It's Showtime 2011 Lyon	Lyon, France	Decision (unanimous)	5	3:00
Fight was for inaugural It's Showtime 73MAX World title -73 kg.
2011-03-26	Win	(Netherlands) Severiano Rijssel	BFN Group presents: It's Showtime Brussels	Brussels, Belgium	TKO (referee stoppage)	2	2:13
2011-02-05	Win	(Netherlands) Karim El Jouharte	30th Gala "Black Panthers	Sint-Niklaas, Belgium	Decision	3	3:00
2010-11-27	Win	(France) Mickael Lallemand	La Nuit du Kick Boxing	Liège, Belgium	TKO (referee stoppage)	3	
2010-02-06	Loss	(France) Karim Ghajji	UKC France MAX, Semi Final	Dijon, France	Decision	3	3:00
2010-02-06	Win	(France) Hichem Chaïbi	UKC France MAX, Quarter Final	Dijon, France	Decision	3	3:00
2009-11-21	Win	(Netherlands) Soufiane Aouragh	It's Showtime 2009 Barneveld	Barneveld, Netherlands	TKO (gave up)	2	
2009-10-24	Win	(Morocco) Mohammed Medhar	It's Showtime 2009 Lommel	Lommel, Belgium	TKO (injury)	2	
2009-05-16	Win	(Morocco) Tarik Mokhtar	It's Showtime 2009 Amsterdam	Amsterdam, Netherlands	Decision	3	3:00
2009-03-14	Win	(Turkey) Tevfik Sucu	War of the ring	Sint-Job-in-'t-Goor, Belgium	TKO (injury)	4	
2009-02-08	Win	(Belgium) Marijn Geuens	Fights at the Border presents: It's Showtime 2009	Antwerp, Belgium	TKO (referee stoppage, 3 knockdowns)	1	
2008-11-29	Win	(Netherlands) Freddy van Duffelen	It's Showtime 2008 Eindhoven	Eindhoven, Netherlands	TKO (referee stoppage)	1	
2008-09-06	Win	(Netherlands) Daniel Corler	It's Showtime 2008 Alkmaar	Alkmaar, Netherlands	Decision	5	3:00
2008-05-25	Win	(Netherlands) Leroy Kaestner	Muay Thai Gala	Hoofddorp, Netherlands	TKO (doctor stoppage)		
2008-04-12	Loss	(Armenia) Ludgens Saribekyan	New Blood 8	Knesselare, Belgium	TKO (referee stoppage)	2	
2007-10-27	Win	(Morocco) Halim Haryouli	One Night in Bangkok	Antwerp, Belgium	Decision		
2007-07-10	Win	(Turkey) Yavuz Kayabasi	Muaythai Gala in Reuver	Reuver, Netherlands	Decision		
Legend: Win Loss Draw/no contest Notes

== See also ==
- List of male kickboxers
