= Josh Jauncey =

Canadian-British kickboxer (born 1993)

- Born: February 10, 1993 (age 33); London, England
- Nationality: Canadian
- Height: 1.81 m (5 ft 11 1/2 in)
- Weight: 70 kg (150 lb; 11 st)
- Division: Lightweight
- Style: Kickboxing
- Stance: Orthodox
- Fighting out of: Surrey, Canada
- Team: WKX Vancouver; Team Souwer
- Trainer: Vincent Jauncey; Andy Souwer

Kickboxing record
- Total: 46
- Wins: 35
- By knockout: 17
- Losses: 11
- By knockout: 2

Amateur record
- Total: 20
- Wins: 17
- By knockout: 9
- Losses: 3

Josh Jauncey (born February 10, 1993) is an English-born Canadian kickboxer who competes in the Glory Lightweight division.

He was ranked in the Combat Press Lightweight top ten between October 2015 and December 2016.

== Career ==
Jauncey made his Glory debut during Glory 16, when he was scheduled to fight Warren Stevelmans. The fight went into an extra round, after which Jauncey won a decision.

Jauncey fought Jae Gil Noh during Glory 18, which he won by a second-round KO.

He was scheduled to fight Max Baumert during Glory 19. Josh won the fight by a third-round TKO.

Jauncey participated in the 2015 Lightweight Contender Tournament. He defeated Djime Coulibaly by TKO, at the tail end of the second round. He met Sitthichai Sitsongpeenong in the finals, and lost by unanimous decision.

After losing the tournament finals, Jauncey was scheduled to fight the pound for pound great Giorgio Petrosyan. He lost the fight by unanimous decision.

Jauncey then went on a 6–3 run, ending on a three fight winning streak, capped off with a split decision win over Christian Baya. His three fight winning streak earned him a chance to rematch Sitthichai Sitsongpeenong for the Glory Lightweight Championship. Sitthichai once again won the fight by unanimous decision.

After his failed title bid, Jauncey lost his next fight to Tyjani Beztati by decision as well. In his next two fights, Jauncey was scheduled to fight Lorawnt Nelson and Stoyan Koprivlenski, both of which he won by decision.

Jauncey was booked to challenge the reigning Glory Lightweight champion Tyjani Beztati at Glory 80 Studio on May 14, 2022.

== Titles and achievements ==
=== Professional ===
- K-1
  - 2026 K-1 Challenge -70 kg Tournament winner

=== Amateur ===
- WKL Super Welterweight North American Champion
- WKL Super Welterweight Pacific Northwest Champion
- TBA-SK Super Welterweight Pacific Northwest Champion
- CMTA Jr British Columbia Champion
- CMTA Jr Canadian Champion
- GG Promotions Junior World Champion

== Kickboxing record ==
Kickboxing record
35 wins (17 (T) KOs), 11 losses
Date	Result	Opponent	Event	Location	Method	Round	Time
2026-08-28	Win	(United States) Henry Todd	K-1 Challenge USA 2026 - The Road to Tokyo Part II, Final	Norman, Oklahoma, USA	TKO (doctor stoppage)	2	
Wins the K-1 Road to Tokyo -70kg Tournament.
2026-08-28	Win	(United States) Anthony Schleiger	K-1 Challenge USA 2026 - The Road to Tokyo Part II, Semifinals	Norman, Oklahoma, USA	Decision (unanimous)	3	3:00
2026-08-28	Win	(United States) Siron Harrison	K-1 Challenge USA 2026 - The Road to Tokyo Part II, Quarterfinals	Norman, Oklahoma, USA	TKO (low kicks)	3	
2024-04-20	Win	(United States) Jamese Taylor III	Canada Cup	Delta, Canada	Decision (unanimous)	3	3:00
2022-05-14	Loss	(Morocco) Tyjani Beztati	Glory 80 Studio	Netherlands	KO (left hook)	2	
For the Glory Lightweight Championship.
2019-11-07	Win	(Bulgaria) Stoyan Koprivlenski	Glory 73: Shenzhen	Shenzhen, China	Decision (split)	3	3:00
2019-09-28	Win	(United States) Lorawnt Nelson	Glory 68: Miami	Miami, United States	Decision (unanimous)	3	3:00
2019-05-17	Loss	(Morocco) Tyjani Beztati	Glory 65: Utrecht	Utrecht, Netherlands	Decision (unanimous)	3	3:00
2018-11-02	Loss	(Thailand) Sitthichai Sitsongpeenong	Glory 61: New York	New York, United States	Decision (unanimous)	5	3:00
For the Glory Lightweight Championship.
2018-06-02	Win	(Angola) Christian Baya	Glory 54: Birmingham	Birmingham, England	Decision (split)	3	3:00
2018-03-31	Win	(Bulgaria) Stoyan Koprivlenski	Glory 52: Los Angeles	Los Angeles, United States	Decision (split)	3	3:00
2017-12-09	Win	(Canada) Stephen Oppomg	PKL Kickboxing 1	Fredericton, Canada	Decision (split)	3	3:00
2017-07-14	Loss	(Albania) Elvis Gashi	Glory 43: New York	New York City, New York, USA	TKO (punches)	2	2:59
2017-04-29	Win	(Spain) Antonio Gomez	Glory 40: Copenhagen	Copenhagen, Denmark	TKO (doctor stoppage)	2	
2016-11-05	Loss	(Angola) Christian Baya	Glory 35: Nice	Nice, France	Decision (majority)	3	3:00
2016-06-25	Loss	(Russia) Anatoly Moiseev	Glory 31: Amsterdam	Amsterdam, Netherlands	Decision (unanimous)	3	3:00
2016-04-02	Win	(China) Xu Yan	Glory of Heroes 1	Shenzhen, China	KO (head kick)	3	0:34
2016-03-12	Win	(France) Johan Tkac	Glory 28: Paris	Paris, France	TKO (doctor stoppage)	2	3:00
2015-11-06	Loss	(Italy) Giorgio Petrosyan	Glory 25: Milan	Monza, Italy	Decision (unanimous)	3	3:00
2015-06-05	Loss	(Thailand) Sitthichai Sitsongpeenong	Glory 22: Lille Lightweight Contender Tournament, Final	Lille, France	Decision (unanimous)	3	3:00
2015-06-05	Win	(France) Djime Coulibaly	Glory 22: Lille Lightweight Contender Tournament, Semi Finals	Lille, France	TKO (2 knockdowns rule)	3	2:59
2015-02-06	Win	(Germany) Max Baumert	Glory 19: Virginia	Hampton, Virginia, USA	TKO (doctor stoppage)	3	0:37
2014-11-07	Win	(South Korea) Jae Gil Noh	Glory 18: Oklahoma	Oklahoma City, Oklahoma, USA	KO (punches & knee)	2	1:14
2014-05-03	Win	(South Africa) Warren Stevelmans	Glory 16: Denver	Broomfield, Colorado, US	Ext.R decision (unanimous)	4	3:00
2013-11-15	Loss	(Japan) Hinata	Shoot Boxing Battle Summit Ground Zero Tokyo 2013	Tokyo, Japan	Decision (unanimous)	3	3:00
2013-07-13	Win	(Spain) David Calvo	Enfusion Live	Spain	TKO		
2013-05-11	Win	(Ukraine) Stanislav Kazantsev	Kickboxgala	Netherlands	Decision	3	3:00
Legend: Win Loss Draw/no contest Notes

Amateur record
Date	Result	Opponent	Event	Location	Method	Round	Time
2012-09-29	Win	(United States) Roy Corona	SEPTEMBER STORM!	Vancouver, Canada	TKO (leg kick)	2	
Wins the North American Welterweight AM Championship.
2012-03-31	Win	(Canada) Jason Hinds	NAC 27	Vancouver, Canada	Decision (unanimous)	3	3:00
Wins the Pacific North West Welterweight AM Championship.
2011-12-03	Loss	(Canada) Hakeem Dawodu	K-1 Last Man Standing 8-man Tournament, Semi Final	Victoria, British Columbia, Canada	Decision (majority)	3	2:00
2011-12-03	Win	(Canada)	K-1 Last Man Standing 8-man Tournament, Quarter Final	Victoria, British Columbia, Canada			
2011-10-21	Win	(Canada) Chris Ferguson	North American Challenge 26	Vancouver, Canada	TKO (retirement)	1	
2011-09-30	Win	(Canada) Ruel Copeland	Fight at The View VII	Vancouver, Canada	Decision (unanimous)	3	3:00
2011-02-25	Win	(Netherlands) Guillermo Valpoort	Fight at The View V	Vancouver, Canada	TKO (spinning back kick)	2	0:53
Wins the World Junior Welterweight Muay Thai Championship.
2010-11-27	Win	(Canada) Jason Szeakeal	Fight at The View IV	Vancouver, Canada	Decision (unanimous)	4	3:00
Wins the B.C. Junior Welterweight Muay Thai Championship.

== Professional boxing record ==
Key to abbreviations used for results
DQ	Disqualification	RTD	Corner retirement
KO	Knockout	SD	Split decision / split draw
MD	Majority decision / majority draw	TD	Technical decision / technical draw
NC	No contest	TKO	Technical knockout
PTS	Points decision	UD	Unanimous decision / unanimous draw

Boxing record
No.	Result	Record	Opponent	Type	Round(s)	Time	Date	Location	Notes
1	Win	1–0	(Canada) Brian Samuel	UD	4 (4),	3:00	30 April 2021	(Canada) The Gaming Stadium, Richmond, British Columbia	

== See also ==
- List of male kickboxers
