= Tyjani Beztati =

Dutch kickboxer (born 1997)

- Born: Tyjanuaryi Shakir Beztati; 21 October 1997 (age 28); Amsterdam, Netherlands
- Nickname: "The Wonderboy"
- Height: 1.90 m (6 ft 3 in)
- Weight: 77 kg (170 lb; 12 st)
- Division: Lightweight
- Style: Kickboxing
- Stance: Orthodox
- Fighting out of: Amsterdam, Netherlands
- Team: Days Gym (2020–present); Colosseum Gym (2017–2020); Vos Gym (2011–2017); Pancration/Chakuriki (2007–2011)
- Years active: 2014 - present

Kickboxing record
- Total: 34
- Wins: 27
- By knockout: 9
- Losses: 5
- By knockout: 0
- Draws: 2

Mixed martial arts record
- Total: 4
- Wins: 4
- By knockout: 4
- Losses: 0

Other information
- Website: https://tyjanibeztati.com/
- Boxing record from BoxRec

Tyjani Shakir Beztati (born October 21, 1997) is a Dutch-Moroccan mixed martial artist and kickboxer. He is a former Glory Lightweight Champion.

== Personal life ==
Beztati was born in Amsterdam to a Moroccan father and a Surinamese mother.

== Kickboxing career ==
=== Glory ===
==== Early promotional career ====
Beztati challenged Sitthichai Sitsongpeenong for the Glory Lightweight Championship at Glory 53: Lille on May 12, 2018. Sitthichai won the fight by a unanimous decision.

Beztati faced Christian Baya, who was likewise coming back from a loss, at Glory 59: Amsterdam on September 29, 2018. He won the fight by split decision. After successfully rebounding from his failed title bid, Beztati faced Stoyan Koprivlenski at Glory 62: Rotterdam on December 8, 2018. He won the fight by a unanimous decision. Beztati next faced fellow one-time Glory lightweight title challenger Josh Jauncey at Glory 65: Utrecht on May 17, 2019. He won the fight by unanimous decision.

Beztati challenged Marat Grigorian for the Glory Lightweight Championship at Glory 69: Düsseldorf on October 12, 2019. Frigorian won the fight by a unanimous decision, with two scorecards of 50–44, two scorecards of 49–45 and once scorecard of 48–46.

Following his second failed title bid, Beztati was booked to face Michaël Palandre at Glory 75: Utrecht on February 29, 2020. He won the fight by a second-round technical knockout, as Palandre retired from the bout at the end of the round due to a broken arm.

==== Glory Lightweight champion ====
Beztati was booked to face Elvis Gashi at Glory 78: Rotterdam for the vacant Glory Lightweight Championship. Despite a poor start to the fight, which saw him get knocked down in the first round, Beztati controlled the remaining four rounds and won the bout by unanimous decision. One judge scored the fight 48–45 in his favor, while the remaining four judges awarded him a 48–44 scorecard.

Beztati made his first Glory Lightweight championship defense against the one-time lightweight title challenger Josh Jauncey at Glory 80 Studio on May 14, 2022. The title bout was part on a three-fight card, available exclusively to viewers who purchased the Glory 80 pay per view. He won the fight by a second-round knockout, stopping Jauncey with a left hook at the 2:25 minute mark.

Beztati made his second title defense against the #1 ranked Glory lightweight contender Stoyan Koprivlenski at Glory: Collision 4 on October 8, 2022. Koprivlenski had earned his chance to challenge for the title with a unanimous decision win against Guerric Billet in a title eliminator at Glory 81: Ben Saddik vs. Adegbuy 2. Beztati retained the title by a split decision.

Beztati made his third title defense against the reigning Glory Featherweight (-65 kg) and RISE Super Lightweight (-65 kg) World champion Petpanomrung Kiatmuu9 at Glory 84 on March 11, 2023. He won the fight by a fourth-round knockout. Beztati was up 30–27 on all five of the judges scorecards at the time of the stoppage.

Beztati made his fourth Glory Lightweight Championship defense against the SHOOT BOXING World Super Welterweight champion Kaito at Glory 87 on August 19, 2023. He won the fight by unanimous decision, with all judges scoring the bout 50–45 in his favor.

Beztati made his fifth Glory Lightweight Championship defense against Enriko Kehl at Glory Heavyweight Grand Prix on March 9, 2024. He won the fight by unanimous decision.

==== Move to welterweight ====
Beztati made his welterweight debut against the former Glory Welterweight champion Endy Semeleer at Glory 93 on July 20, 2024. He won the fight by unanimous decision.

Beztati challenged the Glory Welterweight champion Chico Kwasi at Glory 96 on October 12, 2024. The fight ended in a split decision draw.

Beztati challenged the Glory Welterweight champion Chico Kwasi in a rematch at Glory Underground on May 1, 2025. The fight was again ruled a split decision draw.

On September 1, 2025, Beztati announced his retirement from kickboxing to pursue a career in MMA.

== Mixed martial arts career ==
On September 6, 2025, Beztati confirmed he had signed a contract with the Dutch mixed martial arts promotion Levels Fight League.

Beztati made his Mixed Martial Arts debut at Levels Fight League 20, on November 2, 2025, fighting at 155 pounds, against Italo Julio. He won the bout via TKO in the first round, stopping Julio with leg kicks and punches.

Beztati next fought at Levels Fight League 21, on February 8, 2026, against Josue Ekedi Misseke. This bout was contested at a 161-pound Catchweight. He won the bout via TKO in the first round once again, this time with punches.

Beztati made his third appearance at Levels Fight League 22, on April 11, 2026, against Diego Santos. This bout was also contested at a 161-pound Catchweight. He won the bout via TKO in the first round for a third time, this time with a knee to the head, followed by ground punches.

== Championships and accomplishments ==
- Glory
  - 2021 Glory Lightweight Championship
    - Five successful title defenses
  - Most wins in the Glory Lightweight division (16)

== Mixed martial arts record ==
Professional record breakdown
4 matches	4 wins	0 losses
By knockout	4	0
By submission	0	0
By decision	0	0

Res.	Record	Opponent	Method	Event	Date	Round	Time	Location	Notes
Win	4–0	Daniel Kolasiński	KO (knee)	Levels Fight League 24	September 26, 2026	1	0:55	Den Bosch, Netherlands	Catchweight (159 lb) bout.
Win	3–0	Diego Santos	KO (knee)	Levels Fight League 22	April 11, 2026	1	2:00	Antwerp, Belgium	Catchweight (161 lb) bout.
Win	2–0	Josue Ekedi Misseke	KO (punches)	Levels Fight League 21	February 8, 2026	1	3:56	Amsterdam, Netherlands	Catchweight (161 lb) bout.
Win	1–0	Italo Julio	TKO (leg kick and punches)	Levels Fight League 20	November 2, 2025	1	2:34	Amsterdam, Netherlands	Lightweight debut.

== Kickboxing record ==
Professional kickboxing record
27 wins (9 (T)KOs), 5 losses, 2 draws
Date	Result	Opponent	Event	Location	Method	Round	Time
2025-05-01	Draw	(Netherlands) Chico Kwasi	Glory Underground	Miami, Florida, USA	Decision (split)	5	3:00
For the Glory Welterweight Championship.
2024-10-12	Draw	(Netherlands) Chico Kwasi	Glory 96	Rotterdam, Netherlands	Decision (split)	5	3:00
For the Glory Welterweight Championship.
2024-07-20	Win	(Curaçao) Endy Semeleer	Glory 93	Rotterdam, Netherlands	Decision (unanimous)	3	3:00
2024-03-09	Win	(Germany) Enriko Kehl	Glory Heavyweight Grand Prix	Arnhem, Netherlands	Decision (unanimous)	5	3:00
Defends the Glory Lightweight Championship
2023-08-19	Win	(Japan) Kaito	Glory 87	Rotterdam, Netherlands	Decision (unanimous)	5	3:00
Defends the Glory Lightweight Championship
2023-03-11	Win	(Thailand) Petpanomrung Kiatmuu9	Glory 84	Rotterdam, Netherlands	KO (front kick)	4	1:42
Defends the Glory Lightweight Championship
2022-10-08	Win	(Bulgaria) Stoyan Koprivlenski	Glory: Collision 4	Arnhem, Netherlands	Decision (split)	5	3:00
Defends the Glory Lightweight Championship
2022-05-14	Win	(Canada) Josh Jauncey	Glory 80 Studio	Netherlands	KO (left hook)	2	2:25
Defends the Glory Lightweight Championship.
2021-09-04	Win	(United States) Elvis Gashi	Glory 78: Rotterdam	Rotterdam, Netherlands	Decision (unanimous)	5	3:00
Wins the vacant Glory Lightweight Championship.
2020-02-29	Win	(France) Michaël Palandre	Glory 75: Utrecht	Utrecht, Netherlands	TKO (broken arm)	2	3:00
2019-10-12	Loss	(Armenia) Marat Grigorian	Glory 69: Düsseldorf	Düsseldorf, Germany	Decision (unanimous)	5	3:00
For the Glory Lightweight Championship.
2019-05-17	Win	(Canada) Josh Jauncey	Glory 65: Utrecht	Utrecht, Netherlands	Decision (unanimous)	3	3:00
2018-12-08	Win	(Bulgaria) Stoyan Koprivlenski	Glory 62: Rotterdam	Rotterdam, Netherlands	Decision (unanimous)	3	3:00
2018-09-29	Win	(Angola) Christian Baya	Glory 59: Amsterdam	Amsterdam, Netherlands	Decision (split)	3	3:00
2018-05-12	Loss	(Thailand) Sitthichai Sitsongpeenong	Glory 53: Lille	Lille, France	Decision (unanimous)	5	3:00
For the Glory Lightweight Championship.
2018-03-03	Win	(Turkey) Anil Cabri	Glory 51: Rotterdam	Rotterdam, Netherlands	KO (head kick)	1	2:17
2017-12-09	Loss	(Bulgaria) Stoyan Koprivlenski	Glory 49: Rotterdam, Contender Tournament Final	Rotterdam, Netherlands	Decision (unanimous)	3	3:00
2017-12-09	Win	(Denmark) Niclas Larsen	Glory 49: Rotterdam, Contender Tournament Semi Final	Rotterdam, Netherlands	Decision (unanimous)	3	3:00
2017-09-30	Win	(Thailand) Yodkhunpon Sitmonchai	Glory 45: Amsterdam	Amsterdam, Netherlands	Decision (unanimous)	3	3:00
2017-05-20	Win	(Denmark) Youssef Assouik	Glory: 41 Holland	Den Bosch, Netherlands	Decision (unanimous)	3	3:00
2017-03-25	Win	(Tunisia) Sabri Ben Henia	Glory 39: Brussels	Brussels, Belgium	TKO	2	2:05
2016-12-10	Win	(Germany) Andrej Bruhl	Glory 36: Collision	Oberhausen, Germany	Decision (unanimous)	3	3:00
2016-10-16	Win	(Germany) Nuri Kacar	ACB KB 8: Only The Braves	Hoofddorp, Netherlands	Decision	3	3:00
2016-04-28	Win	(Azerbaijan) Ilyas Rustamov	Tatneft Cup	Kazan, Russia	Decision	3	3:00
2016-04-09	Win	(Indonesia) Melvin Wassing	Real Fighters AN2R & BOTE	Netherlands	KO (flying knee)	2	2:33
2015-12-06	Win	(Denmark) Rhassan Muhareb	Real Fighters A Night 2	Netherlands	KO (flying knee)	1	2:50
2015-08-22	Loss	(China) Yang Zhuo	Wu Lin Feng 2015	Xiamen, China	Decision (unanimous)	3	3:00
2015-03-07	Loss	(Morocco) Ismael Benali	Fight League - The Beginning	Netherlands	Decision	3	3:00
2014-12-28	Win	(Brazil) Marcisio Souza	The Machine Is Back	Paramaribo, Suriname	Decision (unanimous)	3	3:00
2014-11-30	Win	(France) Sidy Barry	Real Fighters	Netherlands	Decision (unanimous)	3	3:00
2014-05-25	Win	(Morocco) Mohammed Didouh	Kickboxing Talents	Amsterdam, Netherlands			
2014-02-22	Win	(Netherlands) Rafik Kassi	Enfusion Live - Sportmani Events V	Netherlands	Decision (unanimous)	3	3:00
Legend: Win Loss Draw/no contest Notes

Amateur kickboxing record
Date	Result	Opponent	Event	Location	Method	Round	Time
2013	Win	(Netherlands) Vural Sen	FightFans 12	Netherlands	KO (right hook)	2	
2013-06-29	Win	(Netherlands) Monir Tour	Death Before Dishonor III	Almere, Netherlands	Decision		
2013-	Win	(Germany) Micheal Wagner		Netherlands	Decision	3	2:00
2013-	Win	(Netherlands) Bart Pluyms	Fight Fans V	Netherlands	Decision	3	2:00
2011-12-18	Win	(Netherlands) Anass Ghalib	Raw Diamonds 2	Almere, Netherlands	TKO (elbows)	3	
2011-11-26	Win	(Netherlands) Dylan Lesage	Mejiro Gym Event	Zaandam, Netherlands	KO (knee)	1	
2011-06-06	Win	(Netherlands) Ehjoup Karbach	Push It 2 The Limit	Amsterdam, Netherlands	Decision	5	1:00
Wins the Junior WMTA Dutch Title.
2011-05-14	Win	(Netherlands) Asdin Azerkan	Get Ready to Rumble	Hoorn, Netherlands	Decision	3	1:00
2011-03-28	Win	(Germany) Marcel Hadjali	DDFN 27	Zaandam, Netherlands	DQ (elbows)	3	0:30
Wins the Super Prestige Youth belt.
2010-02-28	Win	(Netherlands) Roberto Spierings	Amsterdam Fightclub	Amsterdam, Netherlands	TKO		
Legend: Win Loss Draw/no contest Notes

== See also ==
- List of male kickboxers
