= Christian Baya =

Angola kickboxer

- Born: August 27, 1991 (age 35); Germany
- Nickname: Mokuwa Moko; Bad News (former)
- Nationality: Dutch
- Height: 1.79 m (5 ft 10 1/2 in)
- Weight: 70 kg (154 lb; 11 st)
- Division: Lightweight
- Style: Muay Thai, kickboxing
- Stance: Orthodox
- Fighting out of: Amsterdam, Netherlands
- Team: Mike’s Gym
- Trainer: Mike Passenier
- Years active: 2013 - present

Kickboxing record
- Total: 54
- Wins: 32
- By knockout: 15
- Losses: 20
- By knockout: 0
- Draws: 2

Other information
- Boxing record from BoxRec

Christian Baya (born August 27, 1991) is a German-born Dutch kickboxer of Angolan descent who is the former Glory Lightweight Championship title challenger.

He ranked in the world's lightweight top 10 by Combat Press in 2017 and 2018.

== Early years ==
Born in Germany but resident in his father's native Netherlands from a young age, Baya often fights under the flag of Angola which is his mother's home country.

== Professional kickboxing career ==
After his Glory debut win over Josh Jauncey, Baya participated in the Glory Lightweight contender tournament. In the semi-finals he won a split decision over Anatoly Moiseev, and in the finals he likewise won a split decision over Massaro Glunder.

Winning this tournament earned a title shot against the incumbent lightweight champion Sitthichai Sitsongpeenong. Baya lost the title fight by a unanimous decision.

During Glory 49: Rotterdam Baya fought Samo Petje, winning the fight by TKO in the first round, after just 26 seconds.

After his failed title bid, he fought a rematch with Josh Jauncey. Baya would lose the fight by a split decision, which began a four fight split decision losing streak. He lost split decisions to Tyjani Beztati during Glory 59, Marat Grigorian during Glory 62, and Khayal Dzhaniev during SAS Gym 02.

Baya snapped a five fight losing streak during Fair Fight IX, when he won a decision, after an extra round was fought, against Vadim Vaskov.

In late 2019, Baya challenged for the Fair Fight 70 kg title, held at the time by Alexander Skvortsov. He lost the fight by a unanimous decision.

Baya was scheduled to face Amansio Paraschiv at GFC 7: Romania vs. Netherlands II for the GFC Intercontinental Light Middleweight Championship. He lost the bout by split decision.

== Championships and accomplishments ==
- World Fighting League
  - 2026 WFL World Welterweight (-75 kg) Champion
    - One successful title defense
- SENSHI
  - 2026 SENSHI Welterweight (-75 kg) Grand Prix runner-up
- New Lgends
  - 2025 New Legends Fighting Network (-77 kg) Champion
- Glory
  - 2017 Glory Lightweight Contender Tournament winner
- SHOOTBOXING
  - 2015 SHOOTBOXING Super Lightweight Tournament runner-up
- King of Kings
  - 2014 KOK World Grand Prix winner
  - 2013 KOK Qualification Tournament winner

== Fight record ==
Kickboxing record
33 wins (15 (T)KOs), 20 losses, 2 draws
| Date | Result | Opponent | Event | Location | Method | Round | Time |
| 2026-12-05 | | (Germany) Johannes Baas | Mix Fight Championship 56 | Frankfurt, Germany | | | |
| 2026-09-05 | Loss | (Morocco) Anwar Ouled-Chaib | Glory 109 | Rotterdam, Netherlands | Decision (unanimous) | 3 | 3:00 |
| 2026-06-27 | Win | (Netherlands) Jay Overmeer | World Fighting League | Utrecht, Netherlands | KO (right hook) | 1 | 2:00 |
Defends the World Fighting League -75kg title.
| 2026-04-19 | Win | (United Kingdom) Jamie Bates | K-1 World MAX 2026 in Utrecht - World Fighting League | Utrecht, Netherlands | Decision (unanimous) | 5 | 3:00 |
Wins the inaugural World Fighting League -75kg title.
| 2026-02-28 | Loss | (Bulgaria) Zhulien Rikov | SENSHI 30 – 75 kg Grand Prix, Final | Varna, Bulgaria | Decision (unanimous) | 3 | 3:00 |
For the 2026 SENSHI Welterweight (-75kg) Grand Prix title.
| 2026-02-28 | Win | (Spain) Jordi Requejo | SENSHI 30 – 75 kg Grand Prix, Semifinals | Varna, Bulgaria | KO (calf kicks) | 1 | 1:55 |
| 2026-02-28 | Win | (Spain) Jorge Davila | SENSHI 30 – 75 kg Grand Prix, Quarterfinals | Varna, Bulgaria | TKO (2 knockdowns) | 1 | 2:05 |
| 2026-01-25 | Win | (France) Walikhan Hotak | World Fighting League | Utrecht, Netherlands | Decision (unanimous) | 3 | 3:00 |
| 2025-12-20 | Loss | (Morocco) Youssef Khalouta | 8TKO #23 | The Hague, Netherlands | Decision (unanimous) | 5 | 3:00 |
For the vacant Enfusion Welterweight (-77kg) World Championship.
| 2025-10-24 | Loss | (Romania) Florin Lambagiu | Dynamite Fighting Show 28 | Pitești, Romania | Decision (majority) | 3 | 3:00 |
| 2025-10-11 | Win | (Italy) Andrea Rigamonti | New Legends 3 | Woerden, Netherlands | KO | 1 | |
Wins the inaugural NL (-77kg) title.
| 2025-05-17 | Loss | (Slovenia) Samo Petje | Senshi 26 - Gladiators | Plovdiv, Bulgaria | Decision (unanimous) | 3 | 3:00 |
| 2024-12-13 | Win | (Suriname) Mitchel Wielson | Muay Thai Maffia | Paramaribo, Suriname | Decision | 3 | 3:00 |
| 2024-09-29 | Win | (Netherlands) Mustapha Hourri | Fightime | Lisse, Netherlands | TKO | 2 | 3:00 |
| 2023-11-18 | Draw | (Germany) Pascal Schroth | Steko's Fight Night - 35 Years Anniversary | Munich, Germany | Decision | 5 | 3:00 |
For the WKU Muay Thai World -70kg Championship.
| 2023-04-07 | Win | (Germany) Arthur Derksen | Nille's Fight Night 3 | Ehrenburg, Germany | Decision (unanimous) | 3 | 3:00 |
| 2023-03-18 | Loss | (China) Ouyang Feng | Wu Lin Feng 535: China vs Netherlands | Tangshan, China | Decision (unanimous) | 3 | 3:00 |
| 2022-09-10 | Loss | (Chechnya) Saifullah Khambakhadov | Mix Fight Championship | Baku, Azerbaijan | Decision (unanimous) | 3 | 3:00 |
| 2021-12-11 | Loss | (Russia) Vlad Tuinov | Mix Fight Championship: Fight Club, Semi-finals | Frankfurt, Germany | Decision | 3 | 3:00 |
| 2021-06-24 | Loss | (Romania) Amansio Paraschiv | GFC 7: Romania vs. Netherlands II | Bucharest, Romania | Decision (split) | 3 | 3:00 |
| 2019-10-26 | Loss | (Russia) Alexander Skvortsov | Fair Fight X | Yekaterinburg, Russia | Decision (unanimous) | 5 | 3:00 |
For the Fair Fight Lightweight Championship.
| 2019-07-08 | Win | (Belarus) Vadim Vaskov | Fair Fight IX | Yekaterinburg, Russia | Extra round decision | 4 | 3:00 |
| 2019-06-13 | Loss | (Russia) Khayal Dzhaniev | SAS Gym 02, Semi-final | Bucharest, Romania | Decision (split) | 3 | 3:00 |
| 2018-12-08 | Loss | (Armenia) Marat Grigorian | Glory 62: Rotterdam | Netherlands | Decision (split) | 3 | 3:00 |
| 2018-09-29 | Loss | (Morocco) Tyjani Beztati | Glory 59: Amsterdam | Amsterdam, Netherlands | Decision (split) | 3 | 3:00 |
| 2018-06-02 | Loss | (Canada) Josh Jauncey | Glory 54: Birmingham | Birmingham, England | Decision (split) | 3 | 3:00 |
| 2018-02-16 | Loss | (Thailand) Sitthichai Sitsongpeenong | Glory 50:Chicago | Chicago, United States | Decision (unanimous) | 5 | 3:00 |
For the Glory Lightweight Championship.
| 2017-12-09 | Win | (Slovenia) Samo Petje | Glory 49: Rotterdam | Rotterdam, Netherlands | TKO | 1 | 1:26 |
| 2017-06-10 | Win | (Netherlands) Massaro Glunder | Glory 42: Paris Lightweight Contender Tournament, Final | Paris, France | Decision (split) | 3 | 3:00 |
Wins the Glory Lightweight Contender Tournament.
| 2017-06-10 | Win | (Russia) Anatoly Moiseev | Glory 42: Paris - Lightweight Contender Tournament, Semi-finals | Paris, France | Decision (split) | 3 | 3:00 |
| 2016-11-05 | Win | (Canada) Josh Jauncey | Glory 35: Nice | Nice, France | Decision (majority) | 3 | 3:00 |
| 2016-03-19 | Loss | (United Kingdom) Ben Hodge | Yokkao 17 & 18 | Bolton, United Kingdom | Decision | 5 | 3:00 |
| 2016-01-30 | Loss | (Belarus) Chingiz Allazov | Thai Boxe Mania 2016 | Italy | Decision | 3 | 3:00 |
| 2015-11-21 | Win | (Netherlands) Mo Bennasser | Bari Gym Kickboks Event | Netherlands | Decision | 3 | 3:00 |
| 2015-08-22 | Loss | (Japan) Hiroaki Suzuki | SHOOT BOXING 30th Anniversary “CAESAR TIME!” Super Lightweight World Tournament, Final | Tokyo, Japan | Decision | 3 | 3:00 |
| 2015-08-22 | Win | (Thailand) Tapruwan Hadesworkout | SHOOT BOXING 30th Anniversary “CAESAR TIME!” Super Lightweight World Tournament, Semi-final | Tokyo, Japan | KO (right hook) | 4 | 0:37 |
| 2015-04-19 | Win | (Morocco) Brahim Kallah | The Best of all Elements | Netherlands | Decision | 3 | 3:00 |
| 2015-04-11 | Win | (Thailand) Sorgraw Petchyindee | Choc des Mondes | France | KO | 4 | |
| 2014-12-28 | Win | (Suriname) Malic Groenberg | The Machine Is Back | Paramaribo, Suriname | KO | | |
| 2014-11-28 | Win | (Poland) Mateusz Kopiec | KOK WORLD GP 2014 IN PLOCK, Final | Poland | Decision (extra round) | 3 | 3:00 |
Wins the KOK WORLD GP 2014 Tournament.
| 2014-11-28 | Win | (Poland) Robert Rajewski | KOK WORLD GP 2014 IN PLOCK, Semi-finals | Poland | Decision | 3 | 3:00 |
| 2014-08-30 | Win | (England) Greg Wootton | Nak Muay series 3 | England | KO | 1 | |
| 2014-06-07 | Win | (Belgium) Hamza Rahmani | Le Choc des Mondes | France | KO | | |
| 2014-05-03 | Win | (Germany) Leo Bonniger | High Lights | Germany | Decision | 3 | 3:00 |
| 2014-03-15 | Loss | (Lithuania) Tadas Jonkus | KOK WORLD GP 2014 in VILNIUS, Final | Lithuania | Decision | 3 | 3:00 |
For the KOK WORLD GP 2014 in Vilnius title.
| 2014-03-15 | Win | (Moldova) Cristian Dorel | KOK WORLD GP 2014 in VILNIUS, Semi-finals | Lithuania | TKO | 2 | 2:10 |
| 2014-03-15 | Win | (Poland) Karol Lada | KOK WORLD GP 2014 in VILNIUS, Quarter-finals | Lithuania | Decision | 3 | 3:00 |
| 2014-02-08 | Win | (Georgia (country)) Giga Chikadze | Fight Fans VIII | Netherlands | Decision | 3 | 3:00 |
| 2013-12-22 | Loss | (Ukraine) Roman Mailov | W5 GRAND PRIX MOSCOW | Moscow, Russia | Decision | 3 | 3:00 |
| 2013-11-23 | Win | (Ukraine) Andrii Panov | KOK World GP 2013, Qualification Tournament, Final | Germany | TKO | 3 | |
Wins the KOK WORLD GP 2013 Qualification Tournament.
| 2013-11-23 | Win | (Germany) Max Baumert | KOK World GP 2013, Qualification Tournament, Semi-finals | Germany | TKO | 2 | |
| 2013-11-23 | Win | (Germany) Alex Vogel | KOK World GP 2013, Qualification Tournament, Quarter-finals | Germany | KO | 1 | |
| 2013-09-07 | Win | (Netherlands) Mohamed El Messaoudi | Kickboksgala Dangerzone | Netherlands | Decision | 5 | 3:00 |
| 2013-08-03 | Win | (Netherlands) Robbie Hageman | Beat Down | Paramaribo, Suriname | | | |
| 2013-06-01 | Draw | (Netherlands) Cedric Manhoef | Fight Fans V | Amsterdam, Netherlands | Decision | 3 | 3:00 |
| 2013-03-24 | Win | (Netherlands) Kevin Miruka | Muay Thai and MMA event North vs The Rest | Netherlands | Decision | 3 | 3:00 |

== See also ==
- List of male kickboxers
