= Men's K-1 at WAKO World Championships 2007 Belgrade -60 kg =

Kickboxing tournament

The men's lightweight (60 kg/132 lbs) K-1 category at the W.A.K.O. World Championships 2007 in Belgrade was the third lightest of the K-1 tournaments, involving eleven fighters from three continents (Europe, Asia and North America). Each of the matches was three rounds of two minutes each and were fought under K-1 rules.

Due to the tournament having too few fighters for a sixteen-man competition, five of the contestants had byes through to the quarter-finals. The gold medal winner was Elbar Umarakaev from Russia who defeated Turkish fighter Emrah Ogut in the final. Semi finalists the Mexican Gillermo Estrada Martinez and Ukrainian Serhiy Adamchuk won bronze medals.

== Results ==
1st round
(Portugal) Pedro Koll	WIN
(Kyrgyzstan) Aleksei Fedoseyev
(Hungary) Tamas Birics
(Belarus) Yury Dziatlau	WIN
(Russia) Elbar Umarakaev	WIN
(Slovakia) Maros Pacan

Quarter-finals
(Italy) Mattia Caputo
(Mexico) Gillermo Estrada Martinez	WIN
(Turkey) Emrah Ogut	WIN
(Portugal) Pedro Koll
(Ukraine) Serhiy Adamchuk	WIN
(Belarus) Yury Dziatlau
(Russia) Elbar Umarakaev	WIN
(Azerbaijan) Bahtiyar Isgandarzade

Semi-finals
(Mexico) Gillermo Estrada Martinez
(Turkey) Emrah Ogut	WIN
(Ukraine) Serhiy Adamchuk
(Russia) Elbar Umarakaev	WIN

Final
(Turkey) Emrah Ogut
(Russia) Elbar Umarakaev	WIN

== See also ==
- List of WAKO Amateur World Championships
- List of WAKO Amateur European Championships
- List of male kickboxers
