= Petpanomrung Kiatmuu9 =

Thai professional Muay Thai fighter and former kickboxer (born 1995)

Petchpanomrung Kiatmuu9
- Born: Pansang Yamsiri; 26 May 1995 (age 31); Buriram, Thailand
- Other names: Phetpanumrung Mor.Rattanabundit; Petchpanomrung Sor.Thamanragsri (เพชรพนมรุ้ง ส.ธรรมรังสี)
- Nickname: The Professor
- Height: 171 cm (5 ft 7 in)
- Division: Mini Flyweight; Flyweight; Bantamweight; Super Bantamweight Featherweight; Super Featherweight; Lightweight; Super Lightweight; Welterweight
- Reach: 175 cm (69 in)
- Style: Muay Thai
- Stance: Southpaw
- Fighting out of: Bangkok, Thailand
- Team: Kiatmuu9; Fairtex Fight Team

Kickboxing record
- Total: 222
- Wins: 178
- By knockout: 27
- Losses: 41
- Draws: 3

Other information
- Notable relatives: Panomroonglek Kiatmuu9 (brother); Superlek Kiatmuu9 (cousin)
- Boxing record from BoxRec

Petpanomrung Kiatmuu9 (Thai: เพชรพนมรุ้ง เกียรติหมู่เก้า, pronounced "Kiatmuukao"; born 26 May 1995) is a Thai Muay Thai fighter and former kickboxer. He most notably competed in the Featherweight and Lightweight divisions of GLORY, where he was the longest-reigning GLORY Featherweight Champion, and was a one-time GLORY Lightweight title challenger. Kiatmuu9 also competed in the Super Lightweight division of RISE, where he was the inaugural RISE Super Lightweight World Champion. Petpanomrung trains at the legendary Kiatmuu9 gym, which is a training gym that has also prepared multiple Lumpinee Stadium, ONE Championship, and WBC MuayThai world champions. He also trains with Singdam Kiatmuu9.

As of May 2025, he is ranked as the #1 Super Featherweight (-67.5 kg) and #1 pound for pound kickboxer in the world by Beyond Kick and the #1 featherweight (-66 kg) and #2 pound for pound kickboxer by Combat Press. Combat Press has ranked him as a top featherweight since April 2017 and has briefly ranked him as the #7 pound for pound kickboxer in 2021, and is currently #2 as of May 2025.

== Career ==
=== Glory ===
==== Early promotional career ====
Petpanomrung made his Glory debut against Stanislav Reniţă at Glory 35: Nice on 5 November 2016. He won the fight by unanimous decision, with all five judges awarding him all three rounds of the bout.

Petpanomrung took part in the 2017 Glory Featherweight Contender Tournament, which was held at Glory 39: Brussels on 25 March 2017. In the semifinals, he won a unanimous decision against Aleksei Ulianov. Petpanomrung captured the tournament title with a split decision win over Serhiy Adamchuk.

Winning the Contender Tournament earned Petpanomrung a chance to fight for the vacant Glory Featherweight Championship against the #1 ranked contender Robin van Roosmalen at Glory 41: Holland on 20 May 2017. van Roosmalen won the fight majority decision to capture the title. Petpanomrung was deducted a point in the third round for excessive clinching.

After losing his next fight to Rambo PetchPTT at the Lumpini Stadium, Petpanomrung returned to Glory to fight Xie Lei at Glory 46: China on 14 October 2017. He won the fight by unanimous decision.

Petpanomrung faced Zakaria Zouggary at Glory 49: Rotterdam on 9 December 2017. He won the fight by a third-round head kick knockout. Petpanomrung was deducted a point in the third round for excessive clinching.

Petpanomrung faced Abdellah Ezbiri at Glory 53: Lille on 12 May 2018. He won the fight by a second-round head kick knockout. The knockout was later named the 2018 Glory "Knockout of the Year".

==== Glory Featherweight champion ====
Petpanomrung was expected to challenge the reigning Glory Featherweight champion Robin van Roosmalen at Glory 55: New York on 20 July 2018. Roosmalen withdrew from the bout with an injury on 6 July. Petpanomrung was rescheduled to face Kevin VanNostrand for the interim featherweight championship instead. He won the fight by split decision. Petpanomrung signed a new multi-year deal with Glory on 26 March 2019.

Petpanomrung was booked to unify the Glory Featherweight Championship with the full champion Robin van Roosmalen at Glory 59: Amsterdam on 29 September 2018. The pair previously fought a year prior, at Glory 41: Holland, with Van Roosmalen winning a majority decision in their first encounter. Petpanomrung won the fight by unanimous decision, with all five judges awarding him every round of the bout.

Petpanomrung made his first title defense against the former Glory featherweight champion Serhiy Adamchuk at Glory 63: Houston on 2 February 2019, in a rematch of their Glory 39 fight, which Petpanomrung won by split decision. He was more convincing in their second meeting, as he won the fight by unanimous decision, with all five judges scoring the bout 50–45 in his favor.

Petpanomrung was expected to face Sergey Kulyaba at All Star Fight on 9 March 2019. He later withdrew and was replaced by Fonluang Sitboonmee. Petpanomrung made his second title defense against Anvar Boynazarov at Glory 67: Orlando on 5 July 2019. He won the fight by another dominant unanimous decision.

Petpanomrung was expected to make his third title defense against Aleksei Ulianov at Glory 72: Chicago on 23 November 2019. Ulianov withdrew from the bout on 24 June, due to visa issues, and was replaced with Kevin VanNostrand. The rematch between the two ended in a majority decision draw.

Petpanomrung made his fourth title defense against Serhiy Adamchuk at Glory 75: Utrecht on 29 February 2020, whom he had faced and beaten on two previous occasions. He won their trilogy bout by unanimous decision, with all five judges scoring the fight 49–45 for Petpanomrung.

==== Glory & RISE champion ====
Petpanomrung was expected to face the former RISE Lightweight champion Kento Haraguchi at RISE El Dorado 2021, on 21 February 2021. He was later removed from the event as a result of being unable to enter Japan due to safety protocols imposed to combat the COVID-19 pandemic. The fight was rescheduled for RISE World Series 2021 Osaka 2 on 14 November 2021. He won the fight by unanimous decision, with two judges awarding Petpanomrung a 30-28 scorecard, while the third judge scoring the fight 30–29 in his favor. Petpanomrung was shown a yellow card in the second round for excessive clinching.

Petpanomrung faced Kento Haraguchi for the inaugural RISE World Super Lightweight Championship at RISE World Series Osaka 2022 on 21 August 2022. The fight was ruled a split decision draw after the first five rounds, with one judge scoring the bout 50–49 for Haraguchi, the second scoring it 49–48 for Petpanomrung and the third judge scoring it as an even 49–49 draw. Petpanomrung was awarded the unanimous decision, after an extra sixth round was contested.

Petpanomrung was booked to make his return to Glory to defend the Glory Featherweight Championship against the #5 ranked featherweight contender Abraham Vidales at Glory: Collision 4 on 8 October 2022. He retained the title by unanimous decision, with all but one judge awarding him all five rounds of the bout.

Petpanomrung faced the RISE Super Lightweight champion Kosei Yamada in a non-title bout at RISE World Series / Shootboxing-Kings on 25 December 2022. He won the fight by unanimous decision, with two scorecards of 30-29 and one scorecard of 30–28.

Petpanomrung moved up to lightweight to challenge the Glory Lightweight titleholder Tyjani Beztati at Glory 84 on 11 March 2023. He lost the fight by a fourth-round knockout.

Petpanomrung made his sixth Glory Featherweight Championship defense against the #4 ranked Glory featherweight contender Ahmad Chikh Mousa at Glory 86 on 27 May 2023. He retained the title by unanimous decision.

Petpanomrung made his seventh title defense against promotional newcomer David Mejia at Glory 89 on 7 October 2023. He retained the title by split decision.

Petpanomrung made his first RISE Super Lightweight World title defense against RISE WORLD SERIES 2023 Final Round on 16 December 2023. He lost the fight by unanimous decision to Chadd Collins.

==== Glory Featherweight champion ====
Petpanomrung made his eighth Glory Featherweight Championship defense against Kento Haraguchi at Glory 93 on 20 July 2024. He won the fight by unanimous decision.

Petpanomrung faced Taiju Shiratori in the quarterfinals of the GLORY RISE Featherweight Grand Prix, held on 21 December 2024, in Chiba, Japan. He won the fight by unanimous decision, with scores of 30–29, 30–28 and 30–27. In the semifinals of the one-day tournament, Petpanomrung faced the one-time RISE Middleweight champion Lee Sung-hyun. He won the fight by unanimous decision, with all three judges awarding him all three rounds of the bout. Petpanomrung captured the tournament title with a split decision triumph over Miguel Trindade in the finals.

Petpanomrung made his ninth Glory Featherweight Championship defense against Miguel Trindade at Glory 100 on 14 June 2025. He won the fight by unanimous decision, after twice knocking his opponent down.

== Titles and accomplishments ==
=== Kickboxing ===
- RISE
  - 2022 RISE Super Lightweight (-65 kg) World Champion (one time; former)
- Glory
  - 2026 Glory RISE Last Featherweight Standing Tournament Runner-up
  - 2024 Glory RISE Featherweight Grand Prix Winner
  - 2018 Year in Review - Knockout of the Year
  - 2018 Glory Featherweight (-65 kg) Champion (one time; Current)
    - Nine successful title defenses
    - Most successful title defenses in Glory featherweight history (9)
    - Most consecutive title defenses in Glory featherweight history (9)
  - Second most consecutive title defenses in Glory history (9)
  - 2018 interim Glory Featherweight (-65 kg) Champion
  - 2017 Glory Featherweight (-65 kg) Contender Tournament Winner

=== Muay Thai ===
- World Muaythai Council
  - 2016 WMC World Lightweight Champion
- Toyota Marathon
  - 2015 Toyota Vigo Marathon Tournament Champion (64 kg)
- Professional Boxing Association of Thailand (PAT)
  - 2013 Thailand (PAT) Super Featherweight (130 lbs) Champion
    - One successful title defense
  - 2011 Thailand (PAT) Bantamweight (118 lbs) Champion
  - 2010 Thailand (PAT) Mini-Flyweight (105 lbs) Champion

Awards

- 2024 Beyond Kickboxing Fighter of the Year

== Fight record ==
Kickboxing and Muaythai record
178 Wins (27 (T)KO's), 41 Losses, 3 Draws
Date	Result	Opponent	Event	Location	Method	Round	Time
2026-06-06	Loss	(Japan) Kento Haraguchi	RISE World Series 2026 Tokyo - Last Featherweight Standing Final	Tokyo, Japan	Ext.R Decision (Unanimous)	4	3:00
For the Glory RISE Last Featherweight Standing Tournament Title.
2026-06-06	Win	(Portugal) Miguel Trindade	RISE World Series 2026 - Glory - Last Featherweight Standing Semifinals	Tokyo, Japan	Decision (Majority)	3	3:00
2026-03-28	Win	(Mexico) Abraham Vidales	Glory 106 - Last Featherweight Standing Quarterfinals	Tokyo, Japan	Decision (Unanimous)	3	3:00
2025-12-13	Win	(Germany) Denis Wosik	Glory Collision 8 - Last Featherweight Standing Second Round	Arnhem, Netherlands	Decision (Unanimous)	3	3:00
2025-06-14	Win	(Portugal) Miguel Trindade	Glory 100	Rotterdam, Netherlands	Decision (Unanimous)	5	3:00
Defends the Glory Featherweight Championship.
2024-12-21	Win	(Portugal) Miguel Trindade	GLORY RISE Featherweight Grand Prix, Final	Chiba, Japan	Decision (Split)	3	3:00
Wins the 2024 Glory RISE Featherweight Grand Prix.
2024-12-21	Win	(South Korea) Lee Sung-hyun	GLORY RISE Featherweight Grand Prix, Semifinals	Chiba, Japan	Decision (Unanimous)	3	3:00
2024-12-21	Win	(Japan) Taiju Shiratori	GLORY RISE Featherweight Grand Prix, Quarterfinals	Chiba, Japan	Decision (Unanimous)	3	3:00
2024-07-20	Win	(Japan) Kento Haraguchi	Glory 93	Rotterdam, Netherlands	Decision (Unanimous)	5	3:00
Defends the Glory Featherweight Championship.
2023-12-16	Loss	(Australia) Chadd Collins	RISE World Series 2023 - Final Round	Tokyo, Japan	Decision (Unanimous)	5	3:00
Loses the RISE Super Lightweight World title.
2023-10-07	Win	(Spain) David Mejia	Glory 89	Burgas, Bulgaria	Decision (Split)	5	3:00
Defends the Glory Featherweight Championship.
2023-05-27	Win	(Germany) Ahmad Chikh Mousa	Glory 86	Essen, Germany	Decision (Unanimous)	5	3:00
Defends the Glory Featherweight Championship.
2023-03-11	Loss	(Morocco) Tyjani Beztati	Glory 84	Rotterdam, Netherlands	KO (Front kick)	4	1:42
For the Glory Lightweight Championship
2022-12-25	Win	(Japan) Kosei Yamada	RISE WORLD SERIES / Glory Rivals 4	Tokyo, Japan	Decision (Unanimous)	3	3:00
2022-10-08	Win	(Mexico) Abraham Vidales	Glory: Collision 4	Arnhem, Netherlands	Decision (Unanimous)	5	3:00
Defends the Glory Featherweight Championship.
2022-08-21	Win	(Japan) Kento Haraguchi	RISE WORLD SERIES OSAKA 2022	Osaka, Japan	Ext.R Decision (Unanimous)	6	3:00
Wins the inaugural RISE Super Lightweight World title.
2022-06-30	Loss	(Thailand) Chujaroen Dabransarakarm	Petchyindee, Rajadamnern Stadium	Bangkok, Thailand	Decision	5	3:00
2022-02-10	Loss	(Thailand) Chujaroen Dabransarakarm	Petchyindee, Rajadamnern Stadium	Bangkok, Thailand	Decision	5	3:00
2021-11-14	Win	(Japan) Kento Haraguchi	RISE World Series 2021 Osaka 2	Osaka, Japan	Decision (Unanimous)	3	3:00
2021-10-15	Win	(Thailand) Chujaroen Dabransarakarm	True4U Muaymanwansuk	Buriram province, Thailand	Decision	5	3:00
2021-04-09	Loss	(Thailand) Chujaroen Dabransarakarm	Petchyindee Road Show	Songkhla, Thailand	Decision	5	3:00
2020-02-29	Win	(Ukraine) Serhiy Adamchuk	Glory 75: Utrecht	Utrecht, Netherlands	Decision (Unanimous)	5	3:00
Defends the Glory Featherweight Championship.
2019-11-23	Draw	(United States) Kevin VanNostrand	Glory 72: Chicago	Chicago, United States	Decision	5	3:00
Defends the Glory Featherweight Championship.
2019-07-05	Win	(Uzbekistan) Anvar Boynazarov	Glory 67: Orlando	Orlando, United States	Decision (Unanimous)	5	3:00
Defends the Glory Featherweight Championship.
2019-02-02	Win	(Ukraine) Serhiy Adamchuk	Glory 63: Houston	Houston, United States	Decision (Unanimous)	5	3:00
Defends the Glory Featherweight Championship.
2018-09-29	Win	(Netherlands) Robin van Roosmalen	Glory 59: Amsterdam	Amsterdam, Netherlands	Decision (Unanimous)	5	3:00
Won the Glory Featherweight Championship.
2018-07-20	Win	(United States) Kevin VanNostrand	Glory 55: New York	New York City, New York	Decision (Split)	5	3:00
Won the interim Glory Featherweight Championship.
2018-05-12	Win	(France) Abdellah Ezbiri	Glory 53: Lille	Lille, France	KO (Left High Kick)	2	1:40
2017-12-09	Win	(Netherlands) Zakaria Zouggary	Glory 49: Rotterdam	Rotterdam, Netherlands	KO (Head Kick)	3	2:10
2017-10-14	Win	(China) Xie Lei	Glory 46: China	Guangzhou, China	Decision (Unanimous)	3	3:00
2017-08-08	Loss	(Thailand) Rambo Pet.Por.Tor.Or	Lumpinee Stadium	Bangkok, Thailand	TKO (Sweep to head kick)	3	
2017-05-20	Loss	(Netherlands) Robin van Roosmalen	Glory 41: Holland	Den Bosch, Netherlands	Decision (majority)	5	3:00
For the Glory Featherweight Championship.
2017-03-25	Win	(Ukraine) Serhiy Adamchuk	Glory 39: Brussels - Featherweight Contender Tournament, Final	Brussels, Belgium	Decision (Split)	3	3:00
Wins the Glory Featherweight Contender Tournament.
2017-03-25	Win	(Russia) Aleksei Ulianov	Glory 39: Brussels - Featherweight Contender Tournament, Semi Finals	Brussels, Belgium	Decision (Unanimous)	3	3:00
2017-01-13	Loss	(China) Wei Rui	Glory of Heroes 6	Jiyuan, China	Ext. R Decision (Unanimous)	4	3:00
2016-12-24	Loss	(Thailand) Thaksinlek Kiatniwat	Yodmuay Thairath TV	Bangkok, Thailand	Decision	5	3:00
2016-11-24	Win	(Thailand) Kongsak Saenchaimuaythaigym	Bangrajan Fight, Rajadamnern Stadium	Bangkok, Thailand	Decision	5	3:00
2016-11-05	Win	(Moldova) Stanislav Reniţă	Glory 35: Nice	Nice, France	Decision (Unanimous)	3	3:00
2016-09-30	Loss	(Thailand) Muangthai PKSaenchaimuaythaigym	PKSaenchai, Lumpinee Stadium	Bangkok, Thailand	KO (Elbow)	2	1:22
2016-06-10	Loss	(Thailand) Chamuaktong Fightermuaythai	Wanweraphon, Lumpinee Stadium	Bangkok, Thailand	Decision	5	3:00
For the Lumpinee Stadium 140lbs Title.
2016-05-09	Win	(Thailand) Phetmorakot Wor Sangprapai	Wanmitchai, Rajadamnern Stadium	Bangkok, Thailand	Decision	5	3:00
Wins the WMC Muaythai Lightweight World title.
2016-04-07	Win	(Thailand) Chamuaktong Fightermuaythai	Petwiset, Rajadamnern Stadium	Bangkok, Thailand	Decision	5	3:00
2016-03-07	Win	(Thailand) Phetmorakot Wor Sangprapai	Wangingthong, Rajadamnern Stadium	Bangkok, Thailand	Decision	5	3:00
2015-12-25	Loss	(Thailand) Phetmorakot Wor Sangprapai	Toyota Vigo Marathon Tournament 2015, Final	Chon Buri, Thailand	Decision	3	3:00
For the Toyota Vigo Marathon Tournament -62 kg title.
2015-12-25	Win	(Thailand) Manaowan Sitsongpeenong	Toyota Vigo Marathon Tournament 2015, Semi Final	Chon Buri, Thailand	Decision	3	3:00
2015-10-30	Win	(Thailand) Kwankhao Mor.Ratanabandit	Toyota Vigo Marathon Tournament 2015, Final	Thailand	Decision	3	3:00
Wins Toyota Vigo Marathon Tournament -64 kg title.
2015-10-30	Win	(Thailand) Aranchai Kiatphataraphan	Toyota Vigo Marathon Tournament 2015, Semi Final	Thailand	Decision	3	3:00
2015-10-30	Win	(France) Hector Tournier	Toyota Vigo Marathon Tournament 2015, Quarter Final	Bangkok, Thailand	KO (Punch)	1	
2015-09-20	Loss	(Thailand) Yodthunthong Petchyindee Academy	Asawindum Spring News	Bangkok, Thailand	Decision	5	3:00
2015-07-10	Loss	(Thailand) Kwankhao Mor.Ratanabandit	Wanweraphon, Lumpinee Stadium	Bangkok, Thailand	Decision	5	3:00
2015-06-11	Win	(Thailand) Aranchai Kiatphataraphan	Wangingtong, Rajadamnern Stadium	Bangkok, Thailand	Decision	5	3:00
2015-04-02	Win	(Thailand) Kwankhao Mor.Ratanabandit	Wanmitchai + Petchviset, Rajadamnern Stadium	Bangkok, Thailand	Decision	5	3:00
2015-01-25	Win	(Thailand) Aranchai Kiatphataraphan	Chalong Boxing Stadium	Phuket, Thailand	Decision	5	3:00
2014-06-11	Loss	(Thailand) Phetmorakot Wor Sangprapai	Petchviset, Rajadamnern Stadium	Bangkok, Thailand	Decision	5	3:00
2014-05-06	Draw	(Thailand) Yodtuantong Petchyindeeacade	Petchpiya, Lumpinee Stadium	Songkla, Thailand	Decision	5	3:00
2014-04-04	Loss	(Thailand) Phetmorakot Wor Sangprapai	Petyindee + Onesongchai	Songkla, Thailand	Decision	5	3:00
2014-02-28	Win	(Thailand) Singtongnoi Por.Telakun	Lumpinee Champion Krikkrai, Lumpinee Stadium	Bangkok, Thailand	Decision	5	3:00
Defends Thailand (PAT) Super Featherweight (130 lbs) title.
2014-01-21	Loss	(Thailand) Nong-O Kaiyanghadaogym	Praianunt, Lumpinee Stadium	Bangkok, Thailand	Decision	5	33:00
2013-12-03	Win	(Thailand) Yodtuantong Petchyindeeacademy	Lumpinee Stadium	Bangkok, Thailand	Decision	5	33:00
2013-10-08	Loss	(Thailand) Pakorn PKSaenchaimuaythaigym	Lumpinee Stadium	Bangkok, Thailand	Decision	5	3:00
2013-09-04	Win	(Thailand) Phetmorakot Wor Sangprapai	Rajadamnern Stadium	Bangkok, Thailand	Decision	5	3:00
2013-07-12	Win	(Thailand) Kaimukkao Por.Thairongruangkamai	Lumpinee Stadium	Bangkok, Thailand	Decision	5	3:00
Wins the Thailand (PAT) Super Featherweight (130 lbs) title.
2013-06-07	Loss	(Thailand) Kongsak Saenchaimuaythaigym	Lumpinee Stadium	Bangkok, Thailand	Decision	5	3:00
For the Lumpinee Stadium Super Featherweight (130 lbs) title.
2013-05-10	Win	(Thailand) Saeksan Or. Kwanmuang	Lumpinee Stadium	Bangkok, Thailand	Decision	5	3:00
2013-01-04	Win	(Thailand) Sam-A Kaiyanghadaogym	Lumpinee Stadium	Bangkok, Thailand	Decision	5	3:00
2012-12-07	Loss	(Thailand) Penake Sitnumnoi	Lumpinee Stadium	Bangkok, Thailand	Decision	5	3:00
For the Lumpinee Stadium Featherweight (126 lbs) title.
2012-11-02	Loss	(Thailand) Sam-A Kaiyanghadaogym	Lumpinee Stadium	Bangkok, Thailand	Decision	5	3:00
2012-10-04	Loss	(Thailand) Pokaew Fonjangchonburi	Wanmitchai, Rajadamnern Stadium	Bangkok, Thailand	Decision	5	3:00
2012-09-11	Win	(Thailand) Yodkhunpon Sitmonchai	Petchpiya, Lumpinee Stadium	Bangkok, Thailand	Decision	5	3:00
2012-07-31	Win	(Thailand) Ritidej Wor.Wanthavi	Superfight Pumpanmuang, Lumpinee Stadium	Bangkok, Thailand	Decision	5	3:00
2012-07-06	Loss	(Thailand) Pokaew Fonjangchonburi	Petchpiya, Lumpinee Stadium	Bangkok, Thailand	Decision	5	3:00
2012-06-08	Win	(Thailand) Tingtong Chor Koiyuhaisuzu	Ramnumjaiwongkarnmuay, Lumpinee Stadium	Bangkok, Thailand	Decision	5	3:00
2012-05-04	Win	(Thailand) Palangtip Nor.Sripueng	Lumpinee Champion Krikkrai, Lumpinee Stadium	Bangkok, Thailand	Decision	5	3:00
2012-04-03	Loss	(Thailand) Tong Puideenaidee	Petchyindee, Lumpinee Stadium	Bangkok, Thailand	Decision	5	3:00
For the vacant Lumpinee Stadium Super Bantamweight (122 lbs) title and the Thailand Super Bantamweight title.
2012-03-02	Loss	(Thailand) Sam-A Kaiyanghadaogym	Sangsawangpunpa, Lumpinee Stadium	Bangkok, Thailand	Decision	5	3:00
2012-02-03	Win	(Thailand) Thong Puideenaidee	Petchpiya, Lumpinee Stadium	Bangkok, Thailand	KO (head kick)	3	
2011-12-09	Win	(Thailand) Ponsawan Lookprabaht	Lumpinee Champion Krikkrai, Lumpinee Stadium	Bangkok, Thailand	Decision	5	3:00
2011-11-09	Win	(Thailand) Thongchai Sitsongpeenong	Daprungprabaht, Rajadamnern Stadium	Bangkok, Thailand	Decision	5	3:00
2011-09-22	Win	(Thailand) Kaotam Lookprabaht	Daprungprabaht, Rajadamnern Stadium	Bangkok, Thailand	Decision	5	3:00
2011-07-29	Loss	(Thailand) Ponsawan Lookprabaht	Phetsupaphan, Lumpinee Stadium	Bangkok, Thailand	Decision	5	3:00
2011-06-10	Win	(Thailand) Kangwanlek Petchyindee	Lumpinee Champion Krikkrai, Lumpinee Stadium	Bangkok, Thailand	Decision	5	3:00
Wins the Thailand (PAT) Bantamweight (118 lbs) title.
2011-05-20	Win	(Thailand) Kwankhao Chor.Ratchapasadu-Isan	Petchpiya, Lumpinee Stadium	Bangkok, Thailand	Decision	5	3:00
2011-04-29	Loss	(Thailand) Nongbeer Chokngamwong	Phetsupaphan, Lumpinee Stadium	Bangkok, Thailand	Decision	5	3:00
2011-02-15	Win	(Thailand) Nuangthep Eminentair	Petchyindee, Lumpinee Stadium	Bangkok, Thailand	Decision	5	3:00
2010-12-07	Win	(Thailand) Mapichit Sitsongpeenong	Lumpinee Champion Krikkrai, Lumpinee Stadium Birthday Show	Bangkok, Thailand	Decision	5	3:00
2010-10-05	Win	(Thailand) Kiewba Por.Pramuk	Lumpinee Champion Krikkrai, Lumpinee Stadium	Bangkok, Thailand	Decision	5	3:00
2010-09-09	Loss	(Thailand) Mondam Sor.Weerapon	Wanmeechai, Rajadamnern Stadium	Bangkok, Thailand	Decision	5	3:00
2010-08-03	Win	(Thailand) Mondam Sor.Weerapon	Petchyindee, Lumpinee Stadium	Bangkok, Thailand	Decision	5	3:00
Wins the Thailand (PAT) Mini-Flyweight (105 lbs) title.
2010-06-04	Loss	(Thailand) Mondam Sor.Weerapon	Lumpinee Champion Krikkrai, Lumpinee Stadium	Bangkok, Thailand	Decision	5	3:00
2010-05-13	Win	(Thailand) Dang Sor.Ploenchit	Onesongchai, Rajadamnern Stadium	Bangkok, Thailand	Decision	5	3:00
2010-04-06	Win	(Thailand) Prajanchai Por.Phetnamtong	Petchyindee, Lumpinee Stadium	Bangkok, Thailand	Decision	5	3:00
2010-03-11	Win	(Thailand) Karn Kor.Kumpanart	Onesongchai, Lumpinee Stadium	Bangkok, Thailand	Decision	5	3:00
2010-02-09	Loss	(Thailand) Mondam Sor.Weerapon	Wanwerapon, Lumpinee Stadium	Bangkok, Thailand	Decision	5	3:00
2010-01-15	Loss	(Thailand) P.5 Excidicongym	Petsupapan, Lumpinee Stadium	Bangkok, Thailand	Decision	5	3:00
2009-12-22	Win	(Thailand) Petchernchom Sor.Tayang	Petchyindee, Lumpinee Stadium	Bangkok, Thailand	Decision	5	3:00
2009-11-24	Win	(Thailand) P.5 Excidicongym	Werapon, Lumpinee Stadium	Bangkok, Thailand	Decision	5	3:00
2009-11-03	Win	(Thailand) Mondam Sor.Weerapon	Petchyindee, Lumpinee Stadium	Bangkok, Thailand	Decision	5	3:00
2009-10-09	Win	(Thailand) Siangpraiwan Teded99	Petchyindee, Lumpinee Stadium	Bangkok, Thailand	Decision	5	3:00
2009-09-11	Loss	(Thailand) Mondam Sor.Weerapon	Petchyindee, Lumpinee Stadium	Bangkok, Thailand	Decision	5	3:00
2009-06-05	Win	(Thailand) Mondam Sor.Weerapon	Lumpinee Champion Krikkrai, Lumpinee Stadium	Bangkok, Thailand	Decision	5	3:00
2009-04-25	Win	(Thailand) Newpetdam Sor.Kattika	Lumpinee Champion Krikkrai, Lumpinee Stadium	Bangkok, Thailand	Decision	5	3:00
2009-01-16	Win	(Thailand) Charoenthong PetchsiriGym	Petchyindee, Lumpinee Stadium	Bangkok, Thailand	Decision	5	3:00
2009-01-06	Win	(Thailand) Jaroentong Petsirigym	Petchyindee, Lumpinee Stadium	Bangkok, Thailand	Decision	5	3:00
Legend: Win Loss Draw/No contest Notes

== See also ==
- List of male kickboxers
