= Jady Menezes =

Brazilian kickboxer

- Born: Jady Larissa Menezes; 13 February 1992 (age 34); Curitiba, Brazil
- Height: 5 ft 3 in (160 cm)
- Weight: 115 lb (52 kg; 8 st 3 lb)
- Division: Strawweight (MMA); Bantamweight (Kickboxing)
- Reach: 64.0 in (163 cm)
- Style: Kickboxing
- Team: Hemmers Gym
- Years active: 2010–present

Kickboxing record
- Total: 18
- Wins: 14
- By knockout: 6
- Losses: 4

Mixed martial arts record
- Total: 7
- Wins: 6
- By knockout: 3
- By submission: 1
- By decision: 2
- Losses: 1
- By decision: 1

Other information
- Mixed martial arts record from Sherdog

Jady Menezes (born 13 February 1992) is a Brazilian kickboxer who competed in the Glory Bantamweight division.

== Mixed martial arts career ==
Jady Menezes has a 3–1 record in MMA, with 2 wins coming by way of TKO. She has spent the entirety of her MMA career competing for regional promotions in the Paraná state of Brazil from 2014 to 2015.

== Kickboxing career ==
In 2018, at Glory 56: Denver, Menzes faced Anissa Meksen in a bid to win to the Glory Super Bantamweight Kickboxing Championship. Menezes won a highly controversial split decision, which would be dubbed "Robbery of the Year" by Combat Press.

Menezes later lost the title in a rematch against Meksen three months later by way of TKO at Glory 61: New York.

== Championships and accomplishments ==
- Glory
  - Glory Women's Super Bantamweight Champion (55.38 kg/122 lb)

== Mixed martial arts record ==
Professional record breakdown
7 matches	6 wins	1 loss
By knockout	3	0
By submission	1	0
By decision	2	1

Res.	Record	Opponent	Method	Event	Date	Round	Time	Location	Notes
Win	6–1	Eleni Moisidou	Decision (unanimous)	Ares FC 32	June 20, 2025	5	5:00	Brest, France	Defended the Ares FC Women's Flyweight Championship.
Win	5–1	Alexandra Tekenah	Submission (rear-naked choke)	Ares FC 26	October 24, 2024	3	3:31	Aubervilliers, France	Won the vacant Ares FC Women's Flyweight Championship.
Win	4–1	Gisela Luna	TKO (body kick and punches)	UAE Warriors 48	March 3, 2024	2	4:26	Balneário Camboriú, Brazil	
Win	3–1	Marta Souza	Decision (split)	Gladiator CF 13	June 6, 2015	3	5:00	Curitiba, Brazil	
Win	2–1	Jessica Suelem	TKO (punches)	Curitiba Top Fight 9	March 1, 2015	2	2:38	Curitiba, Brazil	Flyweight debut.
Win	1–1	Gisele Cardoso	TKO	Afonso Pena Top Fight 2	December 14, 2014	1	2:19	Maringá, Brazil	
Loss	0–1	Hevellyn Moura	Decision (unanimous)	Maringá Combat 2	December 6, 2014	3	5:00	Maringá, Brazil	Bantamweight debut.

== Kickboxing record ==
Professional Kickboxing record (Incomplete)
14 wins (6 KOs), 4 loss, 0 draw
Date	Result	Opponent	Event	Location	Method	Round	Time
2019-11-23	Win	(Thailand) Chommanee Sor Taehiran	Glory 72: Miami	Miami, Florida	KO (body punch)	3	1:57
2019-09-28	Loss	(United States) Tiffany van Soest	Glory 68: Miami	Miami, Florida	Decision (unanimous)	3	3:00
2018-11-02	Loss	(Algeria) Anissa Meksen	Glory 61: New York	New York City, New York	TKO (punches)	2	0:39
Lost the Glory Women's Super Bantamweight (55.38 kg/122 lb) Championship.
2018-08-10	Win	(Algeria) Anissa Meksen	Glory 56: Denver	Denver, Colorado	Decision (split)	5	3:00
Won the Glory Women's Super Bantamweight (55.38 kg/122 lb) Championship.
2017-07-14	Loss	(Algeria) Anissa Meksen	Glory 43: New York	New York City, New York	Decision (unanimous)	3	3:00
2015-12-13	Win	(Brazil) Caroline Correia	Imortal FC 2: Kamikaze	São José dos Pinhais, Brazil	TKO	2	
Legend: Win Loss Draw/No contest Notes
