= 2018 in Glory =

Kickboxing events

Information
- First date: February 16, 2018
- Last date: December 1, 2018

Events
- Total events: 13

Fights
- Title fights: 17

The year 2018 was the seventh year in the history of Glory, an international kickboxing promotion. The year started with Glory 50: Chicago. The events were broadcast through television agreements with ESPN, Fight Network, and other regional channels around the world.

== Glory 2018 Awards ==
The following fighters won the GLORY Kickboxing year-end awards for 2018:

- Glory Fighter of the Year 2018: Sitthichai Sitsongpeenong
- Glory Fight of the Year 2018: Benjamin Adegbuyi vs. Jahfarr Wilnis (Glory 62)
- Glory Knockout of the Year 2018: Petchpanomrung Kiatmookao vs. Abdellah Ezbiri (Glory 53)
- Glory Newcomer of the Year 2018: Asa Ten Pow

== List of events ==
#	Event Title	Date	Arena	Location
1	Glory 50: Chicago	February 16, 2018	UIC Pavilion	(United States) Chicago, Illinois, US
2	Glory 51: Rotterdam	March 3, 2018	Rotterdam Ahoy	Rotterdam, Netherlands
3	Glory 52: Los Angeles	March 31, 2018	Long Beach Arena	(United States) Los Angeles, US
4	Glory 53: Lille	May 12, 2018	Zénith de Lille	Lille, France
5	Glory 54: Birmingham	June 2, 2018	Genting Arena	Birmingham, England
6	Glory 55: New York	July 20, 2018	The Theater at Madison Square Garden	(United States) New York City, US
7	Glory 56: Denver	August 10, 2018	1stBank Center	(United States) Broomfield, US
8	Glory 57: Shenzhen	August 25, 2018	Shenzhen Bay Sports Center	Shenzhen, China
9	Glory 58: Chicago	September 15, 2018	Sears Centre	(United States) Hoffman Estates, US
10	Glory 59: Amsterdam	September 29, 2018	Johan Cruyff Arena	Amsterdam, Netherlands
11	Glory 60: Lyon	October 20, 2018	Palais des Sports de Gerland	Lyon, France
12	Glory 61: New York	November 2, 2018	Hammerstein Ballroom	(United States) New York City, US
13	Glory 62: Rotterdam	December 1, 2018	Rotterdam Ahoy	Rotterdam, Netherlands

== Glory 50: Chicago ==
Glory 50: Chicago
- Promotion: Glory
- Date: February 16, 2018
- Venue: UIC Pavilion
- City: (United States) Chicago, Illinois, US

Event chronology
Glory 49: Rotterdam	Glory 50: Chicago

Glory 50: Chicago was a kickboxing event held by Glory on February 16, 2018, at the UIC Pavilion in Chicago, Illinois, US.

=== Background ===
This event featured a trilogy fight for the Glory Welterweight Championship between the champion Murthel Groenhart and Harut Grigorian as headliner.

This event also featured a 4-Man Heavyweight Contender Tournament to earn a shot for a Glory Championship.

The GLORY 50 SuperFight Series co-headline bout was originally scheduled to be a rematch between heavyweights Cătălin Moroșanu and Giannis Stoforidis. An injury to Moroșanu forced him from the card.

Anthony McDonald pulled from his fight against Haze Wilson due to high blood pressure.

Due to a cut suffered in the semi-finals Guto was unable to fight in the finals. Junior Tafa stepped in to face Benjamin Adegbuyi.

=== Results ===
Glory 50
Weight Class				Method	Round	Time	Notes
Welterweight 77 kg	(Armenia) Harut Grigorian	def.	(Netherlands) Murthel Groenhart (c)	TKO (Referee Stoppage)	1	2:06	For the Glory Welterweight Championship
Heavyweight 120 kg	(Romania) Benjamin Adegbuyi	def.	(Australia) Junior Tafa	TKO (Low kicks)	2	0:34	Heavyweight Contender Tournament Final
Welterweight 77 kg	(United States) Richard Abraham	def.	(United States) Malik Watson-Smith	Decision (Unanimous)	3	3:00	
Heavyweight 120 kg	(Romania) Benjamin Adegbuyi	def.	(Curaçao) D'Angelo Marshall	KO (Punch)	1	0:36	Heavyweight Contender Tournament Semi-finals
Heavyweight 120 kg	(Brazil) Guto Inocente	def.	(Australia) Junior Tafa	Decision (Unanimous)	3	3:00	Heavyweight Contender Tournament Semi-finals
Superfight Series
Lightweight 70 kg	(Thailand) Sitthichai Sitsongpeenong (c)	def.	(Angola) Christian Baya	Decision (Unanimous)	5	3:00	For the Glory Lightweight Championship
Welterweight 77 kg	(United States) Omar Moreno	def.	(United States) Casey Greene	Decision (Extra Round - Unanimous)	4	3:00	
Welterweight 77 kg	(United States) Omari Boyd	def.	(Mexico) Daniel Morales	Decision (Split)	3	5:00	
Catchweight 68 kg	(Mexico) Diego Llamas	def.	(United States) Justin Houghton	TKO (Referee Stoppage)	1	1:40	

=== 2018 Glory Heavyweight Contender Tournament bracket ===
Semi-finals
(Brazil) Guto Inocente	DEC
(Australia) Junior Tafa	5-0
(Romania) Benjamin Adegbuyi	KO
(Curaçao) D'Angelo Marshall	1R.

Final
(Australia) Junior Tafa	2R.
(Romania) Benjamin Adegbuyi	TKO

== Glory 51: Rotterdam ==
Glory 51: Rotterdam
- Promotion: Glory
- Date: March 3, 2018
- Venue: Rotterdam Ahoy
- City: Rotterdam, Netherlands

Glory 51: Rotterdam "Bad Blood" was a kickboxing event held on March 3, 2018, at Rotterdam Ahoy in Rotterdam, Netherlands.

=== Background ===
The event featured the long-awaited rematch between the champion Badr Hari and Hesdy Gerges as Glory 51 headliner and a number one contender fight between Alim Nabiev and the former Glory Welterweight Champion Cedric Doumbe as Superfight Series headliner.

This event also featured a 4-Man Welterweight Contender Tournament to earn a shot at the Glory Welterweight Championship.

=== Results ===
Glory 51
Weight Class				Method	Round	Time	Notes
Heavyweight 120 kg	(Morocco) Badr Hari	vs	(Netherlands) Hesdy Gerges	No Contest	3	3:00	Originally a decision win for Hari. Later changed to a No Contest after both fighters tested positive for performance-enhancing drugs.
Welterweight 77 kg	(Aruba) Eyevan Danenberg	def.	(Thailand) Thongchai Sitsongpeenong	Decision (Unanimous)	3	3:00	Welterweight Contender Tournament Final
Heavyweight 120 kg	(Slovakia) Tomáš Možný	def.	(Czech Republic) Daniel Škvor	Decision (Unanimous)	3	3:00	
Welterweight 77 kg	(Aruba) Eyevan Danenberg	def.	(France) Jimmy Vienot	Decision (Split)	3	3:00	Welterweight Contender Tournament Semi-finals
Welterweight 77 kg	(Thailand) Thongchai Sitsongpeenong	def.	(Argentina) Alan Scheinson	Decision (Split)	3	3:00	Welterweight Contender Tournament Semi-finals
Superfight Series
Welterweight 77 kg	(Azerbaijan) Alim Nabiev	def.	(France) Cedric Doumbe	Decision (Split)	3	3:00	
Welterweight 77 kg	(Morocco) Mohammed Jaraya	def.	(Suriname) Miles Simson	Decision (Unanimous)	3	3:00	Welterweight Contender Tournament Reserve
Lightweight 70 kg	(Morocco) Tyjani Beztati	def.	(Turkey) Anil Cabri	KO (Head Kick)	1	2:17	
Featherweight 65 kg	(Netherlands) Massaro Glunder	def.	(France) Victor Pinto	Decision (Unanimous)	3	3:00	
Middleweight 85 kg	(Netherlands) Kevin van Heeckeren	def.	(Netherlands) Bas van der Kroon	KO (Punches)	1	2:48	
Prelims
Light Heavyweight 95 kg	(Netherlands) Raymon Bonte	def.	(Latvia) Kristaps Zile	Decision (Unanimous)	3	3:00	
Heavyweight +95 kg	(Netherlands) Jeffrey van Overbeek	def.	(Morocco) Nidal Bchiri	Decision (Split)	3	3:00	

=== 2018 Glory Welterweight Contender Tournament bracket ===
Semi-finals
(Thailand) Thongchai Sitsongpeenong	DEC
(Argentina) Alan Scheinson	3-2
(Aruba) Eyevan Danenberg	DEC
(France) Jimmy Vienot	3-2

Final
(Thailand) Thongchai Sitsongpeenong	5-0
(Aruba) Eyevan Danenberg	DEC

== Glory 52: Los Angeles ==
Glory 52: Los Angeles
- Promotion: Glory
- Date: March 31, 2018
- Venue: Long Beach Arena
- City: (United States) Los Angeles, California, US

Glory 52: Los Angeles was a kickboxing event held on March 31, 2018, at the Long Beach Arena in Los Angeles, California, US.

=== Background ===
The GLORY 52 co-main event bout was originally scheduled to be match between Lightweights Marat Grigorian and Stoyan Koprivlenski. Grigorian had to withdraw due to a neck injury, whilst Koprivlenski took on Josh Jauncey instead.

Robert Thomas suffered a concussion during training and was forced to withdraw from Glory Middleweight Contender Tournament. Following this shake-up, the remaining three middleweight tournament contenders were rebooked.

Simon Marcus remained on the card, and met Zack Wells in the Glory 52 co-headline bout.

Yousri Belgaroui and Jason Wilnis were originally scheduled to compete in the middleweight contender tournament, but instead squared off as part of Glory 53 SuperFight Series from Lille, France.

Bonus awards:

The following fighter has been awarded $5,000 bonus:

- Performance of the Night: Josh Jauncey

=== Results ===
Glory 52
Weight Class				Method	Round	Time	Notes
Featherweight 65 kg	(Netherlands) Robin van Roosmalen (c)	def.	(United States) Kevin VanNostrand (ic)	Decision (Unanimous)	5	3:00	For the unification of Glory Featherweight Championship
Middleweight 85 kg	(Canada) Simon Marcus	def.	(United States) Zack Wells	TKO (Punches)	1	1:03	
Middleweight 85 kg	(United States) Mike Lemaire	def.	(United States) Chris Camozzi	Decision (Unanimous)	3	3:00	
Lightweight 70 kg	(Canada) Josh Jauncey	def.	(Bulgaria) Stoyan Koprivlenski	Decision (Split)	3	3:00	
Superfight Series
Light Heavyweight 95 kg	(Ukraine) Pavel Zhuravlev (ic)	def.	(United States) Myron Dennis	Decision (Unanimous)	3	3:00	For the Interim Glory Light Heavyweight Championship
Women's Catchweight 53 kg	(France) Anissa Meksen	def.	(Canada) Ashley Nichols	Decision (Unanimous)	3	3:00	
Middleweight 85 kg	(United States) Troy Jones	def.	(United States) Paul Banasiak	Decision (Unanimous)	3	3:00	
Featherweight 65 kg	(Netherlands) Zakaria Zouggary	def.	(England) Bailey Sugden	Decision (Unanimous)	3	3:00	
Prelims
	(United States) Jermaine Soto	def.	(United States) Alex Highley	Decision (split)	3	3:00	
	(United States) Arthur Estrazulas	def.	(United States) Chris Bonilla	TKO	3		
	(United States) Gerrica Trias	def.	(United States) Natalie Morgan	Decision (unanimous)	3	3	
	(United States) Jose Palacios	def.	(United States) Sovankesa Som	Decision (split)	3	3:00	
	(United States) Charles Rodriguez	def.	(United States) Brian Bruns	Decision (unanimous)	3	3:00	

== Glory 53: Lille ==
Glory 53: Lille
- Promotion: Glory
- Date: May 12, 2018
- Venue: Zénith de Lille
- City: Lille, France

Glory 53: Lille was a kickboxing event held on May 12, 2018, at the Zénith de Lille in Lille, France.

=== Background ===
Eyevan Danenberg suffered an injury during training and was forced to withdraw from his fight against Cedric Doumbe. Thongchai Sitsongpeenong stepped in to face Doumbe.

Also a severe hand injury forced Mohammed Jaraya to withdraw from his showdown with Alan Scheinson, Anghel Cardoş stepped in on a short notice to face Scheinson.

Jason Wilnis was forced to withdraw for medical reasons, Dawid Kasperski stepped in on a week's notice to take on Yousri Belgaroui.

Bonus awards:

The following fighter has been awarded $5,000 bonus:

- Performance of the Night: Petchpanomrung Kiatmookao

=== Results ===
Glory 53
Weight Class				Method	Round	Time	Notes
Lightweight 70 kg	(Thailand) Sitthichai Sitsongpeenong (c)	def.	(Morocco) Tyjani Beztati	Decision (Unanimous)	5	3:00	For the Glory Lightweight Championship
Heavyweight 120 kg	(Netherlands) Jahfarr Wilnis	def.	(Morocco) Jamal Ben Saddik	Decision (Unanimous)	3	3:00	
Super Bantamweight 55 kg	(France) Anissa Meksen (c)	def.	(France) Amel Dehby	Decision (Unanimous)	5	3:00	For the Glory Women's Super Bantamweight Championship
Light Heavyweight 93 kg	(France) Zinedine Hameur-Lain	def.	(Netherlands) Michael Duut	TKO (3 Knockdowns Rule)	2	1:14	
Featherweight 66 kg	(Thailand) Petchpanomrung Kiatmookao	def.	(Morocco) Abdellah Ezbiri	KO (Head Kick)	2	1:40	
Superfight Series
Welterweight 77 kg	(France) Cedric Doumbe	def.	(Thailand) Thongchai Sitsongpeenong	KO (Punch)	1	0:33	
Middleweight 85 kg	(Tunisia) Yousri Belgaroui	def.	(Poland) Dawid Kasperski	TKO (3 Knockdowns Rule)	2	1:16	
Featherweight 66 kg	(Ukraine) Serhiy Adamchuk	def.	(France) Victor Pinto	Decision (Unanimous)	3	3:00	Featherweight Contender Tournament Final
Lightweight 70 kg	(Argentina) Alan Scheinson	def.	(Romania) Anghel Cardoș	Decision (Unanimous)	3	3:00	
Featherweight 66 kg	(Ukraine) Serhiy Adamchuk	def.	(France) Azize Hlali	Decision (Unanimous)	3	3:00	Featherweight Contender Tournament Semi-finals
Featherweight 66 kg	(France) Victor Pinto	def.	(Turkey) Buray Bozaryilmaz	Decision (Majority)	3	3:00	Featherweight Contender Tournament Semi-finals
Prelims
Heavyweight +95 kg	(France) Valentin Ponthieux-Anicet	def.	(Portugal) Quentin Domingos	TKO	3	0:23	
Catchweight 72 kg	(Belgium) Jannes Vercaemst	draw.	(Belgium) Paul Guislain	Decision	3	3:00	
Lightweight 70 kg	(France) Sidy Barry	def.	(Morocco) Badr Houdoe	Decision (Split)	3	3:00	

=== 2018 Glory Featherweight Contender Tournament bracket ===
Semi-finals
(France) Victor Pinto	DEC
(Turkey) Buray Bozaryilmaz	3-1
(Ukraine) Serhiy Adamchuk	DEC
(France) Azize Hlali	5-0

Final
(France) Victor Pinto	5-0
(Ukraine) Serhiy Adamchuk	DEC

== Glory 54: Birmingham ==
Glory 54: Birmingham
- Promotion: Glory
- Date: June 2, 2018
- Venue: Genting Arena
- City: Birmingham, England

Glory 54: Birmingham was a kickboxing event held on June 2, 2018, at the Genting Arena in Birmingham, England.

=== Background ===
Bonus awards:

The following fighter has been awarded $5,000 bonus:

- Performance of the Night: Harut Grigorian

=== Results ===
Glory 54
Weight Class				Method	Round	Time	Notes
Heavyweight 120 kg	(Netherlands) Rico Verhoeven (c)	def.	(Croatia) Mladen Brestovac	Decision (Unanimous)	5	3:00	For the Glory Heavyweight Championship
Welterweight 77 kg	(Armenia) Harut Grigorian (c)	def.	(Azerbaijan) Alim Nabiev	Decision (Unanimous)	5	3:00	For the Glory Welterweight Championship
Featherweight 65 kg	(England) Bailey Sugden	vs.	(Russia) Aleksei Ulianov	No Contest (Accidental Headbutt)	2	1:10	
Featherweight 65 kg	(China) Zhang Chenglong	def.	(Romania) Adrian Maxim	Decision (Unanimous)	3	3:00	
Superfight Series
Light Heavyweight 95 kg	(Democratic Republic of the Congo) Danyo Ilunga	def.	(England) Fraser Weightman	Decision (Unanimous)	3	3:00	
Lightweight 70 kg	(Canada) Josh Jauncey	def.	(Angola) Christian Baya	Decision (Split)	3	3:00	
Welterweight 77 kg	(England) Adam Hatfield	def.	(United States) Richard Abraham	Decision (Split)	3	3:00	
Lightweight 70 kg	(Armenia) Marat Grigorian	def.	(China) Liu Xu	Decision (Unanimous)	3	3:00	
Lightweight 70 kg	(Kosovo) Elvis Gashi	def.	(England) William Goldie-Galloway	Decision (Unanimous)	3	3:00	
Welterweight 77 kg	(England) Mark Timms	def.	(Poland) Dawid Blaszke	Decision (Unanimous)	3	3:00	Welterweight Qualification Tournament Semi-finals
Welterweight 77 kg	(England) Jamie Bates	def.	(England) Tommy King	Decision (Unanimous)	3	3:00	Welterweight Qualification Tournament Semi-finals
Prelims
Welterweight 77 kg	(England) Kevin Ward	def.	(São Tomé and Príncipe) Wilker Barros	Decision (Split)	3	3:00	
Bantamweight 55 kg	(England) Christi Brereton	def.	(England) Nicola Kaye	Decision (Unanimous)	3	3:00	
Lightweight 70 kg	(England) Vinny Church	def.	(England) Ben Woolliss	Decision (Split)	3	3:00	

== Glory 55: New York ==
Glory 55: New York
- Promotion: Glory
- Date: July 20, 2018
- Venue: Hulu Theater
- City: (United States) New York City, New York, US

Glory 55: New York was a kickboxing event held on July 20, 2018, at Hulu Theater in New York City, New York, US.

=== Background ===
The GLORY 55 main event bout was originally scheduled to be a rematch for the Glory Featherweight Championship between the champion Robin van Roosmalen and Petchpanomrung Kiatmookao. Van Roosmalen had to withdraw due to a shoulder injury, Kiatmookao instead fought Kevin VanNostrand for the Glory Featherweight interim-title.

Bonus awards:

The following fighter has been awarded $5,000 bonus:

- Performance of the Night: Alex Pereira

=== Results ===
Glory 55
Weight Class				Method	Round	Time	Notes
Middleweight 85 kg	(Brazil) Alex Pereira (c)	def.	(Tunisia) Yousri Belgaroui	KO (Punch)	1	2:28	For the Glory Middleweight Championship
Featherweight 65 kg	(Thailand) Petchpanomrung Kiatmookao	def.	(United States) Kevin VanNostrand	Decision (Split)	5	3:00	For the interim Glory Featherweight Championship
Heavyweight 120 kg	(Australia) Junior Tafa	def.	(United States) Anthony McDonald	TKO (3 Knockdown Rule)	1	2:20	
Featherweight 65 kg	(France) Victor Pinto	def.	(United States) Nate Richardson	Decision (Split)	3	3:00	
Lightweight 70 kg	(Kosovo) Elvis Gashi	def.	(United States) Nick Chasteen	Decision (Unanimous)	3	3:00	
Superfight Series
Welterweight 77 kg	(France) Cedric Doumbe	def.	(Argentina) Alan Scheinson	TKO (Punches)	2	1:38	
Super Bantamweight 55 kg	(United States) Tiffany van Soest	def.	(Sweden) Sofia Olofsson	Decision (Split)	3	3:00	
Lightweight 70 kg	(Israel) Itay Gershon	def.	(United States) Trevor Ragin	TKO (Punch)	2	0:36	
Featherweight 65 kg	(United States) Asa Ten Pow	def.	(United States) Justin Greskiewicz	TKO (3 Knockdown Rule)	1	2:59	
Middleweight 85 kg	(United States) Jacob Rodriguez	def.	(United States) Joe Taylor	Decision (Unanimous)	3	3:00	
Prelims
Catchweight 57 kg	(Canada) Jonathan Di Bella	def.	(Palestine) Ahmad Ibrahim	Decision (Unanimous)	3	3:00	
Lightweight 70 kg	(United States) Brandon Cuttino	def.	(United States) John Morehouse	Decision (Unanimous)	3	3:00	

== Glory 56: Denver ==
Glory 56: Denver
- Promotion: Glory
- Date: August 10, 2018
- Venue: 1stBank Center
- City: (United States) Broomfield, US

Glory 56: Denver was a kickboxing event held on August 10, 2018, at the 1stBank Center in Broomfield, US.

=== Background ===
This event featured two world title fights for the Glory Light Heavyweight Championship a rematch between the champion Artem Vakhitov and Danyo Ilunga and for the Glory Women's Super Bantamweight Championship between the champion Anissa Meksen and Jady Menezes.

=== Results ===
Glory 56
Weight Class				Method	Round	Time	Notes
Light Heavyweight 95 kg	(Russia) Artem Vakhitov (c)	def.	(Democratic Republic of the Congo) Danyo Ilunga	Decision (Unanimous)	5	3:00	For the Glory Light Heavyweight Championship
Super Bantamweight 55 kg	(Brazil) Jady Menezes	def.	(France) Anissa Meksen (c)	Decision (Split)	5	3:00	For the Glory Women's Super Bantamweight Championship
Featherweight 65 kg	(Ukraine) Serhiy Adamchuk	def.	(Uzbekistan) Anvar Boynazarov	Decision (Unanimous)	3	3:00	
Featherweight 65 kg	(Netherlands) Massaro Glunder	def.	(New Zealand) Quade Taranaki	Decision (Unanimous)	3	3:00	
Superfight Series
Middleweight 85 kg	(Canada) Simon Marcus	def.	(Netherlands) Jason Wilnis	Decision (Split)	3	3:00	
Heavyweight 120 kg	(Curaçao) D'Angelo Marshall	def.	(United States) Antonio Dvorak	TKO (Punch)	1	2:14	
Lightweight 70 kg	(United States) Justin Houghton	def.	(Canada) Troy Sheridan	Decision (Unanimous)	3	3:00	
Heavyweight 120 kg	(United States) Myron Dennis	def.	(United States) Steve Paprocki	TKO (3 Knockdowns)	1	1:49	
Light Heavyweight 95 kg	(United States) Chris Camozzi	def.	(United States) John King	TKO (Punches)	2	2:48	
Middleweight 85 kg	(United States) Ryot Waller	def.	(United States) Zack Wells	KO (Punches)	3	0:57	

== Glory 57: Shenzhen ==
Glory 57: Shenzhen
- Promotion: Glory
- Date: August 25, 2018
- Venue: Shenzhen Bay Sports Center
- City: Shenzhen, China

Glory 57: Shenzhen was a kickboxing event held on August 25, 2018, at the Shenzhen Bay Sports Center in Shenzhen, China.

=== Background ===
Zinedine Hameur-Lain withdrew from his scheduled appearance against Felipe Micheletti, and both fighters were rebooked at a later date.

Bonus awards:

The following fighter has been awarded $5,000 bonus:

- Performance of the Night: Liu Xu

=== Results ===
Glory 57
Weight Class				Method	Round	Time	Notes
Lightweight 70 kg	(Thailand) Sitthichai Sitsongpeenong (c)	def.	(Armenia) Marat Grigorian	Decision (Split)	5	3:00	For the Glory Lightweight Championship
Welterweight 77 kg	(Belgium) Cedric de Keirsmaeker	def.	(China) Kaiyin Zang	Decision (Split)	3	3:00	
Lightweight 70 kg	(Russia) Khayal Dzhaniev	def.	(Brazil) Julio Lobo	Decision (Unanimous)	3	3:00	
Featherweight 65 kg	(China) Chenglong Zhang	vs.	(Belgium) Nafi Bilalovski	No Contest (Accidental Foul)	1	2:43	
Featherweight 65 kg	(United States) Asa Ten Pow	def.	(China) Yuhang Xie	Decision (Split)	3	3:00	
Superfight Series
Lightweight 70 kg	(China) Liu Xu	def.	(China) Wensheng Zhang	Decision (Split)	3	3:00	Lightweight Qualification Tournament Final
Featherweight 65 kg	(China) Chenchen Li	def.	(Japan) Masaya Kubo	Decision (Unanimous)	3	3:00	
Super Bantamweight 55 kg	(China) Jia Liu	def.	(Thailand) Zaza Sor. Aree	Decision (Unanimous)	3	3:00	
Lightweight 70 kg	(China) Wensheng Zhang	def.	(China) Li Deng	Decision (Split)	3	3:00	Lightweight Qualification Tournament Semi-finals
Lightweight 70 kg	(China) Liu Xu	def.	(China) Chao Wang	Decision (Unanimous)	3	3:00	Lightweight Qualification Tournament Semi-finals
Prelims
Lightweight 70 kg	(China) Wensheng Zhang	def.	(China) Lei Feng	Decision (Split)	3	3:00	Lightweight Qualification Tournament Quarter-finals
Lightweight 70 kg	(China) Li Deng	def.	(China) Alimu	TKO (3 Knockdowns)	1	2:51	Lightweight Qualification Tournament Quarter-finals
Lightweight 70 kg	(China) Chao Wang	def.	(China) Tiehan Xu	Decision (Split)	3	3:00	Lightweight Qualification Tournament Quarter-finals
Lightweight 70 kg	(China) Liu Xu	def.	(China) Junchen Zhao	Decision (Split)	3	3:00	Lightweight Qualification Tournament Quarter-finals

=== 2018 Glory Lightweight Qualification Tournament bracket ===
Quarter-finals
(China) Lei Feng	1-4
(China) Wensheng Zhang	DEC
(China) Li Deng	TKO
(China) Alimjan Tursun	1r
(China) Tiehan Xu	1-4
(China) Chao Wang	DEC
(China) Liu Xu	DEC
(China) Junchen Zhao	4-1

Semi-finals
(China) Wensheng Zhang	DEC
(China) Li Deng	3-2
(China) Chao Wang	0-5
(China) Liu Xu	DEC

Final
(China) Wensheng Zhang	1-4
(China) Liu Xu	DEC

== Glory 58: Chicago ==
Glory 58: Chicago
- Promotion: Glory
- Date: September 14, 2018
- Venue: Sears Centre
- City: (United States) Hoffman Estates, US

Glory 58: Chicago was a kickboxing event held on September 14, 2018, at the Sears Centre in Hoffman Estates, US.

=== Background ===
The bout between welterweight Alan Scheinson and Malik Watson-Smith was canceled due to visa issues on Scheinson's part.

Troy Jones won the 4-man Welterweight Qualification Tournament as Mike Lemaire could not continue due to his injuries and Justin Moss who won earlier in the evening did not receive medical clearance to fight Jones.

Bonus awards:

The following fighter has been awarded $5,000 bonus:

- Performance of the Night: Alex Pereira

=== Results ===
Glory 58
Weight Class				Method	Round	Time	Notes
Middleweight 85 kg	(Brazil) Alex Pereira (c)	def.	(Canada) Simon Marcus	Decision (Unanimous)	5	3:00	For the Glory Middleweight Championship
Heavyweight 120 kg	(Romania) Benjamin Adegbuyi	def.	(Netherlands) Jahfarr Wilnis	Decision (Unanimous)	3	3:00	
Welterweight 77 kg	(United States) Omari Boyd	def.	(United States) Richard Abraham	Decision (Split)	3	3:00	
Featherweight 65 kg	(Uzbekistan) Anvar Boynazarov	def.	(England) Bailey Sugden	Decision (Split)	3	3:00	
Superfight Series
Heavyweight 120 kg	(Australia) Junior Tafa	def.	(United States) Haze Wilson	TKO (Punch)	1	1:35	
Middleweight 85 kg	(United States) Matt Baker	def.	(United States) Thomas Jenkins	KO (Punches)	3	1:55	
Welterweight 77 kg	(United States) Troy Jones	def.	(United States) Casey Greene	KO (Head Kick)	1	1:00	Welterweight Qualification Tournament Semi-finals
Welterweight 77 kg	(United States) Mike Lemaire	def.	(United States) Omar Moreno	Decision (Unanimous)	3	3:00	Welterweight Qualification Tournament Semi-finals
Prelims
Featherweight 65 kg	(Morocco) Houssam El Kasri	def.	(United States) Kou Lee	TKO (Knee to the head)	2	2:35	
Welterweight 77 kg	(United States) Justin Moss	def.	(United States) Paul Banasiak	Decision (Split)	3	3:00	
Lightweight 70 kg	(United States) Nick Chasteen	def.	(United States) John Morehouse	Decision (Unanimous)	3	3:00	
Lightweight 70 kg	(South Africa) Lowrant-T Nelson	def.	(United States) Trevor Ragin	Decision (Unanimous)	3	3:00	

== Glory 59: Amsterdam ==
Glory 59: Amsterdam
- Promotion: Glory
- Date: September 29, 2018
- Venue: Johan Cruyff Arena
- City: Amsterdam, Netherlands

Glory 59: Amsterdam was a kickboxing event held on September 29, 2018, at the Johan Cruyff Arena in Amsterdam, Netherlands.

=== Background ===
Bonus awards:

The following fighter has been awarded $5,000 bonus:

- Performance of the Night:

=== Results ===
Glory 59
Weight Class				Method	Round	Time	Notes
Heavyweight 120 kg	(Netherlands) Rico Verhoeven (c)	def.	(Brazil) Guto Inocente	Decision (Unanimous)	5	3:00	For the Glory Heavyweight Championship
Featherweight 65 kg	(Thailand) Petchpanomrung Kiatmookao (ic)	def.	(Netherlands) Robin van Roosmalen (c)	Decision (Unanimous)	5	3:00	For the unification of Glory Featherweight Championship
Heavyweight 120 kg	(Morocco) Jamal Ben Saddik	def.	(Curaçao) D'Angelo Marshall	TKO (3 Knockdowns Rule)	1	0:57	
Welterweight 77 kg	(Morocco) Tyjani Beztati	def.	(Angola) Christian Baya	Decision (Unanimous)	3	3:00	
Superfight Series
Welterweight 77 kg	(Suriname) Murthel Groenhart	def.	(Morocco) Mohammed Jaraya	TKO (Punches)	2	1:05	
Welterweight 77 kg	(Azerbaijan) Alim Nabiev	def.	(Aruba) Eyevan Danenberg	Decision (Split)	3	3:00	
Light Heavyweight 95 kg	(Netherlands) Michael Duut	def.	(Tunisia) Mourad Bouzidi	KO (Punch)	3	2:56	
Heavyweight 120 kg	(Netherlands) Roel Mannaart	def.	(Czech Republic) Daniel Škvor	Decision (Unanimous)	3	3:00	
Featherweight 65 kg	(Russia) Aleksei Ulianov	def.	(Netherlands) Zakaria Zouggary	Decision (Unanimous)	3	3:00	
Prelims
Lightweight 70 kg	(Bulgaria) Stoyan Koprivlenski	def.	(Turkey) Anil Cabri	Decision (Unanimous)	3	3:00	
Middleweight 85 kg	(Suriname) Donovan Wisse	def.	(Netherlands) Kevin Van Heeckeren	Decision (Unanimous)	3	3:00	
Welterweight 77 kg	(Suriname) Miles Simson	def.	(Netherlands) Kevin Hessling	TKO (Punches)	1	0:54	
Catchweight 72.5 kg	(Netherlands) Robbie Hageman	def.	(Morocco) Brahim Kallah	Decision (Unanimous)	3	3:00	

== Glory 60: Lyon ==
Glory 60: Lyon
- Promotion: Glory
- Date: October 20, 2018
- Venue: Palais des Sports de Gerland
- City: Lyon, France

Glory 60: Lyon was a kickboxing event held on October 20, 2018, at the Palais des Sports de Gerland in Lyon, France.

=== Background ===
Glory welterweight champion Harut Grigorian was unable to compete due to acute gastroenteritis that has forced him from the fight card. Therefore, Cédric Doumbé took on Muay Thai fighter Jimmy Vienot. Vienot was scheduled to fight earlier in that evening, but has seized a short notice opportunity to headline opposite the former champion. His original opponent, Dmitry Menshikov, met Samuel Dbili as part of SuperFight Series.

Bonus awards:

The following fighter has been awarded $5,000 bonus:

- Performance of the Night:

=== Results ===
Glory 60
Weight Class				Method	Round	Time	Notes
Welterweight 77 kg	(France) Cédric Doumbé	def.	(France) Jimmy Vienot	Decision (Unanimous)	3	3:00	
Light Heavyweight 95 kg	(Suriname) Donegi Abena	def.	(France) Stéphane Susperregui	Decision (Unanimous)	3	3:00	
Middleweight 85 kg	(Tunisia) Yousri Belgaroui	def.	(France) Yassine Ahaggan	KO (Knee to the Body)	1	1:22	
Super Bantamweight 55 kg	(Sweden) Sofia Olofsson	def.	(France) Cindy Silvestre	Decision (Unanimous)	3	3:00	
Featherweight 65 kg	(Morocco) Abdellah Ezbiri	def.	(France) Victor Pinto	KO (Spinning Back Kick)	1	1:03	
Superfight Series
Light Heavyweight 95 kg	(Brazil) Felipe Micheletti	def.	(France) Zinedine Hameur-Lain	TKO (Retirement)	1	3:00	
Heavyweight 120 kg	(Brazil) Bruno Chaves	def.	(France) Mamadou Lamine Sene	TKO (Doctor Stoppage)	2	3:00	
Middleweight 85 kg	(Czech Republic) Matěj Peňáz	def.	(France) Mehdi Bouanane	TKO (Doctor Stoppage)	2	3:00	
Welterweight 77 kg	(Russia) Dmitry Menshikov	def.	(France) Samuel Dbili	TKO (3 Knockdowns Rule)	1	2:59	
Lightweight 70 kg	(France) Michael Palandre	def.	(France) Mohamed Soumah	TKO (Arm Injury)	2	0:50	
Prelims
Featherweight 65 kg	(Thailand) Thong Fairtex	def.	(France) Victor Bordage	Decision (unanimous)	3	3:00	
Featherweight 65 kg	(France) Guerric Billet	def.	(France) Hafed Romdhane	TKO (punches)	3	1:42	
Featherweight 65 kg	(France) Said Ahamada	def.	(France) Geoffrey Vivies	Decision (split)	3	3:00	
Featherweight 65 kg	(France) Yoann Mermoux	def.	(France) Franck Reoutzkoff	Decision (unanimous)	3	3:00	

== Glory 61: New York ==
Glory 61: New York
- Promotion: Glory
- Date: November 2, 2018
- Venue: Hammerstein Ballroom
- City: (United States) New York City, US

Glory 61: New York was a kickboxing event held on November 2, 2018, at the Hammerstein Ballroom in New York City, US.

=== Background ===
Bonus awards:

The following fighter has been awarded $5,000 bonus:

- Performance of the Night: Anissa Meksen

=== Results ===
Glory 61
Weight Class				Method	Round	Time	Notes
Lightweight 70 kg	(Thailand) Sitthichai Sitsongpeenong (c)	def.	(Canada) Josh Jauncey	Decision (Unanimous)	5	3:00	For the Glory Lightweight Championship
Super Bantamweight 55 kg	(France) Anissa Meksen	def.	(Brazil) Jady Menezes (c)	TKO (Punches)	2	0:39	For the Glory Super Bantamweight Championship
Light Heavyweight 95 kg	(United States) Chris Camozzi	def.	(United States) Myron Dennis	Decision (Unanimous)	3	3:00	
Welterweight 77 kg	(United States) Omari Boyd	def.	(Argentina) Alan Scheinson	Decision (Unanimous)	3	3:00	
Superfight Series
Featherweight 65 kg	(United States) Kevin VanNostrand	vs.	(Netherlands) Massaro Glunder	Decision (Unanimous)	3	3:00	
Featherweight 65 kg	(United States) Asa Ten Pow	def.	(Greece) Niko Tsigaras	Decision (Unanimous)	3	3:00	
Welterweight 77 kg	(United States) Charles Rodriguez	def.	(United States) Malik Watson-Smith	TD (Unanimous)	2	3:00	
Lightweight 70 kg	(United States) Justin Houghton	def.	(United States) Vince McGuinness	Decision (Unanimous)	3	3:00	
Super Bantamweight 55 kg	(Thailand) Chommanee Sor Taehiran	def.	(Canada) Ashley Nichols	Decision (Split)	3	3:00	
Prelims
Featherweight 65 kg	(United States) Nate Richardson	def.	(United States) Justin Greskiewicz	TKO	1	2:33	
Featherweight 65 kg	(Mexico) Abraham Vidales	def.	(Morocco) Houssam El Kasri	TKO (left hook)	1	1:48	
Catchweight 57 kg	(Canada) Jonathan Di Bella	def.	(United States) Mohammed Lemjerdine	Decision (unanimous)	3	3:00	
Catchweight 82 kg	(Haiti) Harry Gèrmaín	def.	(United States) Iskander Usmonov	KO (punches)	1	0:41	

== Glory 62: Rotterdam ==
Glory 62: Rotterdam
- Promotion: Glory
- Date: December 8, 2018
- Venue: Rotterdam Ahoy
- City: Rotterdam, Netherlands

Event chronology
Glory 62: Rotterdam	Glory 63: Houston

Glory 62: Rotterdam was a kickboxing event held on December 8, 2018 at Rotterdam Ahoy in Rotterdam, Netherlands.

=== Background ===
Glory's No.1-ranked heavyweight Benjamin Adegbuyi of Romania has been named the No. 1 seed in the tournament draw. Seed No. 2 has been assigned to Jamal Ben Saddik of Morocco. Heavyweight champion Rico Verhoeven talks acting career and could be stripped of belt.

On November 15, it was announced that Mohammed Jaraya had suffered a hand injury and was pulling out of his bout with Robbie Hageman. Jaraya was replaced by Dmitrii Menshikov.

Bonus awards:

The following fighters will be awarded $5,000 bonuses:

- Fighter of the Night:
- Knockout of the Night:

=== Results ===
Glory 62
Weight Class				Method	Round	Time	Notes
Heavyweight 120 kg	(Morocco) Jamal Ben Saddik	def.	(Romania) Benjamin Adegbuyi	KO (Punches)	1	1:54	Heavyweight Tournament Final
Light Heavyweight 95 kg	(Netherlands) Luis Tavares	def.	(Latvia) Artur Gorlov	Decision (Split)	3	3:00	
Heavyweight 120 kg	(Morocco) Jamal Ben Saddik	def.	(Brazil) Guto Inocente	Decision (Unanimous)	3	3:00	Heavyweight Tournament Semi-finals
Heavyweight 120 kg	(Romania) Benjamin Adegbuyi	def.	(Netherlands) Jahfarr Wilnis	KO (Head Kick)	3	2:39	Heavyweight Tournament Semi-finals
Heavyweight 120 kg	(Brazil) Guto Inocente	def.	(Germany) Mohamed Abdallah	Decision (Split)	3	3:00	Heavyweight Tournament Quarter-finals
Heavyweight 120 kg	(Netherlands) Jahfarr Wilnis	def.	(Slovakia) Tomáš Možný	Decision (Split)	3	3:00	Heavyweight Tournament Quarter-finals
Heavyweight 120 kg	(Morocco) Jamal Ben Saddik	def.	(Australia) Junior Tafa	TKO (2 Knockdowns Rule)	1	2:55	Heavyweight Tournament Quarter-finals
Heavyweight 120 kg	(Romania) Benjamin Adegbuyi	def.	(Poland) Arkadiusz Wrzosek	Decision (Unanimous)	3	3:00	Heavyweight Tournament Quarter-finals
Superfight Series
Lightweight 70 kg	(Armenia) Marat Grigorian	def.	(Angola) Christian Baya	Decision (Split)	3	3:00	
Lightweight 70 kg	(Morocco) Tyjani Beztati	def.	(Bulgaria) Stoyan Koprivlenski	Decision (Unanimous)	3	3:00	
Welterweight 77 kg	(Russia) Dmitry Menshikov	def.	(Netherlands) Robbie Hageman	TKO (Punches)	1	1:53	
Welterweight 77 kg	(Morocco) Hamicha	def.	(Netherlands) Miles Simson	KO (Head Kick)	1	1:53	
Heavyweight 120 kg	(Netherlands) Roel Mannaart	def.	(Russia) Kirill Kornilov	Decision (Unanimous)	3	3:00	Heavyweight Tournament Reserve
Prelims
Middleweight 85 kg	(Turkey) Ertugrul Bayrak	def.	(Suriname) Donovan Wisse	Decision (Split)	3	3:00	

=== Glory Heavyweight Tournament bracket ===
Quarter-finals
(Romania) Benjamin Adegbuyi	DEC
(Poland) Arkadiusz Wrzosek	5-0
(Netherlands) Jahfarr Wilnis	DEC
(Slovakia) Tomaš Mozny	4-1
(Morocco) Jamal Ben Saddik	TKO
(Australia) Junior Tafa	1R.
(Brazil) Guto Inocente	DEC
(Germany) Mohamed Abdallah	4-1

Semi-finals
(Romania) Benjamin Adegbuyi	KO
(Netherlands) Jahfarr Wilnis	3R.
(Morocco) Jamal Ben Saddik	DEC
(Brazil) Guto Inocente	5-0

Final
(Romania) Benjamin Adegbuyi	1R.
(Morocco) Jamal Ben Saddik	KO

== See also ==
- 2018 in Glory of Heroes
- 2018 in Kunlun Fight
- 2018 in K-1
- 2018 in ONE Championship
- 2018 in Romanian kickboxing
