= Kaimukkao Por.Thairongruangkamai =

Thai Muay Thai fighter (born 1990)

- Born: July 18, 1990 (age 36); Buriram, Northeast of Thailand
- Other names: Kaimukkao Watcharachaigym; Kaimukkaw Chuwattana (ไข่มุกขาว ชูวัฒนะ); Kaimukkao Pornkwanarong (ไข่มุกขาว ป้อมขวัญณรงค์); Kaimookkao PetchyindeeAcademy; Kaimukkao Sor.Kiatiwat; Kaimookkao Sit-O (ไข่มุกขาว ศิษย์โอ)
- Height: 170 cm (5 ft 7 in)
- Weight: 60.0 kg (132.3 lb; 9.45 st)
- Fighting out of: Bangkok, Thailand
- Team: Sit-O

Kaimukkao (Thai: ไข่มุกขาว) is a Thai Muay Thai fighter.

== Titles and accomplishments ==
- Professional Boxing Association of Thailand (PAT)
  - 2015 Thailand 135 lbs Champion
- Rajadamnern Stadium
  - 2010 Rajadamnern Stadium 126 lbs Champion
  - 2011 Rajadamnern Stadium Fight of the Year (vs Saeksan Or. Kwanmuang)
  - 2012 Rajadamnern Stadium 130 lbs Champion
  - 2016 Rajadamnern Stadium 130 lbs Champion
- World Boxing Council Muaythai
  - 2012 WBC Muay Thai World 130 lbs Champion

== Fight record ==
Kickboxing record
Date	Result	Opponent	Event	Location	Method	Round	Time
2018-03-17	Loss	(Thailand) Nuenglanlek Jitmuangnon	Siam Omnoi Stadium	Bangkok, Thailand	KO (Elbow)	3	
For the vacant Omnoi Stadium 135lbs title
2018-02-08	Win	(Thailand) Nuenglanlek Jitmuangnon		Thailand	Decision	5	3:00
2017-11-09	Loss	(Thailand) Nuenglanlek Jitmuangnon	Rajadamnern Stadium	Bangkok, Thailand	Decision	5	3:00
2017-08-04	Loss	(Thailand) Sangmanee Sor Tienpo	True4U MuaymanWansuk,Rangsit Stadium	Pathum Thani, Thailand	KO	3	
For the True4U 135 lbs title.
2017-06-05	Loss	(Thailand) Superlek Kiatmuu9	Rajadamnern Stadium	Bangkok, Thailand	KO (Right Upper Elbow)	2	
2017-05-04	Loss	(Thailand) Sangmanee Sor Tienpo	Rajadamnern Stadium	Bangkok, Thailand	Decision	5	3:00
2017-04-06	Win	(Thailand) Rodtang Jitmuangnon	Rajadamnern Stadium	Bangkok, Thailand	Decision	5	3:00
2017-02-02	Loss	(Thailand) Phet Utong Or. Kwanmuang	Rajadamnern Stadium	Bangkok, Thailand	KO ( Right Elbow)	2	
2016-12-22	Win	(Thailand) Superball Tded99	Rajadamnern Stadium	Bangkok, Thailand	KO (Right High Kick)	4	
2016-11-14	Loss	(Thailand) Muangthai PKSaenchaimuaythaigym	Rajadamnern Stadium	Bangkok, Thailand	KO (Left Upper Elbow)	3	1:00
2016-09-30	Win	(Thailand) Rodlek P.K. Saenchaimuaythaigym	Lumpinee Stadium	Bangkok, Thailand	Decision	5	3:00
2016-08-11	Loss	(Thailand) Yodlekpet Or. Pitisak	Rajadamnern Stadium	Bangkok, Thailand	KO (Left Low Kicks)	2	
2016-06-24	Win	(Thailand) Yodlekpet Or. Pitisak	Lumpinee Stadium	Bangkok, Thailand	Decision	5	3:00
2016-05-09	Win	(Thailand) Kaewkangwan Prewayo	Rajadamnern Stadium	Bangkok, Thailand	Decision	5	3:00
Wins Rajadamnern Stadium 130 lbs title
2016-04-07	Win	(Thailand) Kwan Suanmisakawan	Rajadamnern Stadium	Bangkok, Thailand	Decision	5	3:00
2016-02-17	Win	(Thailand) Bangpleenoi Petchyindee Academy	Rajadamnern Stadium	Bangkok, Thailand	Decision	5	3:00
2015-12-08	Win	(Thailand) Bangpleenoi Petchyindee Academy	Lumpinee Stadium	Bangkok, Thailand	Decision	5	3:00
Wins Thailand 135 lbs title
2015-10-30	Loss	(Thailand) Kwankhao Mor.Ratanabandit	Toyota Marathon, Semi Final	Nakhon Ratchasima, Thailand	Decision	3	3:00
2015-10-30	Win	(Peru) Victor Makchaga	Toyota Marathon, Quarter Final	Nakhon Ratchasima, Thailand	Decision	3	3:00
2015-10-11	Win	(Thailand) Pet Moosapanmai	Rangsit Stadium	Pathum Thani, Thailand	KO	3	
2015-09-06	Loss	(Thailand) Arunchai Kiatpataraphan	Rangsit Stadium	Pathum Thani, Thailand	Decision	5	3:00
2014-10-09	Loss	(Thailand) Superlek Kiatmuu9	Rajadamnern Stadium	Bangkok, Thailand	KO (Right High Kick)	3	2:49
2014-08-13	Win	(Thailand) Phonek Mor.Puwana	Rajadamnern Stadium	Bangkok, Thailand	Decision	5	3:00
2014-07-08	Loss	(Thailand) Kwankhao Mor.Ratanabandit	Lumpinee Stadium	Bangkok, Thailand	Decision	5	3:00
2014-06-11	Draw	(Thailand) Kwankhao Mor.Ratanabandit	Rajadamnern Stadium	Bangkok, Thailand	Decision	5	3:00
2014-05-06	Loss	(Thailand) Kwankhao Mor.Ratanabandit	Lumpinee Stadium	Bangkok, Thailand	Decision	5	3:00
For the Thailand (PAT) Super Featherweight title (130 lbs).
2014-02-28	Win	(Thailand) Pettawee Sor Kittichai	Lumpinee Stadium	Bangkok, Thailand	Decision	5	3:00
2014-01-03	Win	(Thailand) Phetmorakot Petchyindee Academy	Lumpinee Stadium	Bangkok, Thailand	Decision	5	3:00
2013-10-11	Loss	(Thailand) Saeksan Or. Kwanmuang	Lumpinee Stadium	Bangkok, Thailand	KO (Left Elbow)	1	3:00
2013-09-04	Win	(Thailand) Saksuriya Kaiyangadaogym	Rajadamnern Stadium	Bangkok, Thailand	Decision	5	3:00
2013-07-12	Loss	(Thailand) Petpanomrung Kiatmuu9	Lumpinee Stadium	Bangkok, Thailand	Decision	5	3:00
For the Thailand (PAT) Super Featherweight title (130 lbs)
2013-06-03	Win	(Thailand) Ausiewpor Sujibamikiew	Rajadamnern Stadium	Bangkok, Thailand	Decision	5	3:00
2013-05-02	Win	(Thailand) Ausiewpor Sujibamikiew	Rajadamnern Stadium	Bangkok, Thailand	Decision	5	3:00
2013-03-25	Win	(Thailand) Kiatphet Sunahanpeekmai	Rajadamnern Stadium	Bangkok, Thailand	Decision	5	3:00
2012-10-16	Loss	(Thailand) Fahsang Sor.Chokitchai	Lumpinee Stadium	Bangkok, Thailand	Decision	5	3:00
2012-09-12	Loss	(Thailand) Singtongnoi Por.Telakun	Lumpinee Stadium	Bangkok, Thailand	TKO (Elbow)	3	
2012-07-05	Win	(Thailand) Ekkarit Mor.Krungthepthonburee	Rajadamnern Stadium	Bangkok, Thailand	Decision	5	3:00
Wins vacant Rajadamnern Stadium and WBC Muay Thai World 130 lbs title.
2012-06-03	Win	(Japan) Shunta	Bigbang 9	Tokyo, Japan	Decision (Unanimous)	5	3:00
2012-04-17	Win	(Thailand) Lekkla Thanasuranakorn	Lumpinee Stadium	Bangkok, Thailand	Decision	5	3:00
2012-03-26	Win	(Thailand) Yuttachai Kiettipatphan	Rajadamnern Stadium	Bangkok, Thailand	Decision	5	3:00
2011-09-01	Loss	(Thailand) Saeksan Or. Kwanmuang	Rajadamnern Stadium	Bangkok, Thailand	KO (Straight Right)	2	1:10
2011-08-04	Win	(Thailand) Ritidet Wor-Wantawee	Rajadamnern Stadium	Bangkok, Thailand	Decision	5	3:00
2011-06-30	Loss	(Thailand) Ekkarit Mor Krungtheptonburee	Rajadamnern Stadium	Bangkok, Thailand	KO (high kick)	4	
For the vacant Rajadamnern Stadium 126 lbs title.
2011-04-07	Win	(Thailand) Kongsiam Tor.Phittakachai	Rajadamnern Stadium	Bangkok, Thailand	Decision	5	3:00
2011-02-23	Win	(Thailand) Ekkarit Mor Krungtheptonburee	Rajadamnern Stadium	Bangkok, Thailand	Decision	5	3:00
2011-01-31	Loss	(Thailand) Kongsiam Tor.Phittakachai	Rajadamnern Stadium	Bangkok, Thailand	Decision	5	3:00
Loses the Rajadamnern Stadium 126 lbs title.
2010-12-16	Loss	(Thailand) Phet-to Sitjaopho	Rajadamnern Stadium	Bangkok, Thailand	Decision	5	3:00
2010-10-07	Loss	(Thailand) Phet-Ek Sitjaopho	Rajadamnern Stadium	Bangkok, Thailand	Decision	5	3:00
2010-08-30	Loss	(Thailand) Phet-Ek Sitjaopho	Rajadamnern Stadium	Bangkok, Thailand	Decision	5	3:00
2010-08-09	Win	(Thailand) Kongsayarm Tor-Pitakchai	Rajadamnern Stadium	Bangkok, Thailand	Decision	5	3:00
Wins vacant Rajadamnern Stadium 126 lbs title.
2010-06-07	Win	(Thailand) Kaenfang Por Pongchon	Rajadamnern Stadium	Bangkok, Thailand	Decision	5	3:00
2010-05-15	Win	(Thailand) Rittijak Kaewsamrit	Omnoi Stadium	Samut Sakhon, Thailand	KO	3	
2010-03-01	Win	(Thailand) Kongsiam Tor.Phittakachai	Rajadamnern Stadium	Bangkok, Thailand	KO	4	
2010-02-01	Win	(Thailand) Rambo Phetphokao	Rajadamnern Stadium	Bangkok, Thailand	KO	4	
2009-11-04	Win	(Thailand) Dejsuriya Sitthiprasert	Rajadamnern Stadium	Bangkok, Thailand	Decision	5	3:00
2009-09-10	Win	(Thailand) Thongchai Tor. Silachai	Rajadamnern Stadium	Bangkok, Thailand	Decision	5	3:00
2009-05-23	Loss	(Thailand) Kongsak P.K. Saenchaimuaythaigym	Omnoi Stadium	Samut Sakhon, Thailand	KO (Elbow)	4	3:00
2009-03-14	Loss	(Thailand) Petchdam Sitboonmee	Omnoi Stadium	Samut Sakhon, Thailand	KO	4	
2009-02-14	Win	(Thailand) Chaimongkol M16	Omnoi Stadium	Samut Sakhon, Thailand	Decision	5	3:00
2008-11-06	Loss	(Thailand) Thongchai Tor. Silachai	Rajadamnern Stadium	Bangkok, Thailand	Decision	5	3:00
2008-09-13	Win	(Thailand) Luknimit Singklongsi	Onesongchai	Bangkok, Thailand	Decision	5	3:00
2008-07-10	Loss	(Thailand) Luknimit Singklongsi	Rajadamnern Stadium	Bangkok, Thailand	TKO	5	
2008-05-22	Win	(Thailand) Thaweesak Singklongsi	Kiatyongyuth, Rajadamnern Stadium	Bangkok, Thailand	Decision	5	3:00
2008-04-10	Loss	(Thailand) Daoden Singklongsi	Onesongchai, Rajadamnern Stadium	Bangkok, Thailand	KO	3	
2008-03-12	Win	(Thailand) Thaweesak Singklongsi	Rajadamnern Stadium	Bangkok, Thailand	Decision	5	3:00
2008-02-16	Win	(Thailand) Wanmainoi Decharat		Bangkok, Thailand	KO	4	
2007-07-28	Win	(Thailand) Yodprabsuk Por.Kumpai	Onesongchai	Bangkok, Thailand	Decision	5	3:00
2007-06-27	Win	(Thailand) Super Champ Wor.Singsaneh	Kitsingnoi, Rajadamnern Stadium	Bangkok, Thailand	Decision	5	3:00
Legend: Win Loss Draw/No contest Notes
