= Mondam Sor.Weerapon =

Thai Muay Thai fighter

Mondam
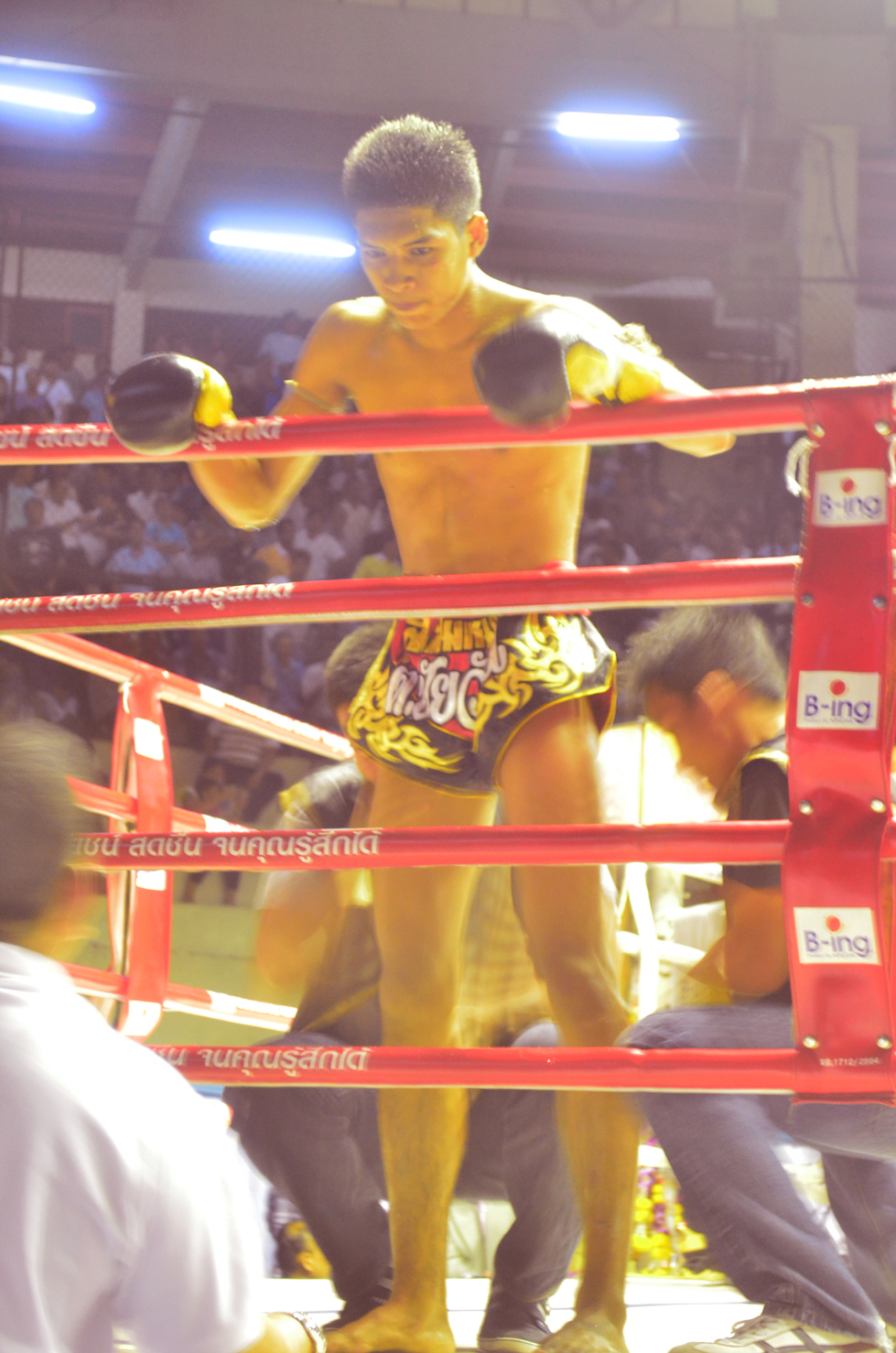
- Born: Anu Srithep; January 19, 1993 (age 33); Thung Yai district, Nakhon Si Thammarat province, Thailand
- Other names: Mondam Sor Wirapon; Mondam Sor.Werapol; Monedum Sor Werapon
- Height: 172 cm (5 ft 8 in)
- Weight: 53 kg (117 lb; 8.3 st)
- Style: Muay Thai
- Stance: Orthodox
- Fighting out of: Bangkok, Thailand
- Team: Werapon; Meenayothin

Other information
- Boxing record from BoxRec

Anu Srithep (Thai: อนุ ศรีเทพ) known professionally as Mondam Sor.Weerapon (Thai: มนต์ดำ ศ.วีระพล) is a Thai Muay Thai fighter.

== Career ==
On November 23, 2012, Mondam defeated Ekmongkol Gaiyanghadao on a Petchyindee promoted event at the Lumpinee Stadium.

On July 12, 2012 Mondam faced Superlek Wor.Sangprapai for the Wanmeechai promotion at the Rajadamnern Stadium. He won the fight by decision.

On March 8, 2013 Mondam challenged Chokpreecha Kor.Sakunchuer for his Lumpinee Stadium Bantamweight (118 lbs) title. He won the fight by third round knockout with a right cross.

Mondam lost his Lumpinee Stadium Bantamweight (118 lbs) title on June 7, 2013, during his first defense. He was knocked out by Superlek Wor.Sangprapai with an elbow in the third round.

On September 6, 2013, Mondam faced Suakim Sor.Jor.Tongprajin for the vacant Lumpinee Stadium Bantamweight (118 lbs) title. He lost the fight by decision.

Mondam was featured on the last card at the old Lumpinee Stadium on February 7, 2014. He defeated Lamnampong Noomjeantawana by decision.

== Titles and accomplishments ==
- Lumpinee Stadium
  - 2013 Lumpinee Stadium Bantamweight (118 lbs) Champion
- Professional Boxing Association of Thailand (PAT)
  - 2010 Thailand (PAT) Mini-Flyweight (105 lbs) Champion
  - 2010 Thailand (PAT) Light-Flyweight (108 lbs) Champion

== Muay Thai record ==
Muay Thai Record
Date	Result	Opponent	Event	Location	Method	Round	Time
2014-02-28	Win	(Thailand) Prajanchai P.K.Saenchaimuaythaigym	Lumpinee Champion Krikkrai, Lumpinee Stadium	Bangkok, Thailand	Decision	5	3:00
2014-02-07	Win	(Thailand) Lamnampong Noomjeantawana	Petchyindee, Lumpinee Stadium	Bangkok, Thailand	Decision	5	3:00
2014-01-07	Loss	(Thailand) Prajanchai P.K.Saenchaimuaythaigym	Petchpiya, Lumpinee Stadium	Bangkok, Thailand	Decision	5	3:00
2013-09-06	Loss	(Thailand) Suakim Sor.Jor.Tongprajin	Lumpinee Champion Krikkrai, Lumpinee Stadium	Bangkok, Thailand	Decision	5	3:00
For the vacant Lumpinee Stadium Bantamweight (118 lbs) title
2013-06-07	Loss	(Thailand) Superlek Kiatmuu9	Lumpinee Champion Krikkrai, Lumpinee Stadium	Bangkok, Thailand	KO (Right Elbow)	3	1:22
Loses the Lumpinee Stadium Bantamweight (118 lbs) title.
2013-04-30	Win	(Thailand) Ekmongkol Gaiyanghadao	Weerapon, Lumpinee Stadium	Bangkok, Thailand	Decision	5	3:00
2013-03-08	Win	(Thailand) Chokpreecha Kor.Sakunchuer	Lumpinee Champion Krikkrai, Lumpinee Stadium	Bangkok, Thailand	KO (Right cross)	3	
Wins the Lumpinee Stadium Bantamweight (118 lbs) title.
2013-02-15	Win	(Thailand) Superlek Kiatmuu9	Weerapon, Lumpinee Stadium	Bangkok, Thailand	Decision	5	3:00
2012-12-24	Win	(Thailand) Sornnarai Sor.Sommai	Sor.Sommai, Rajadamnern Stadium	Bangkok, Thailand	Decision	5	3:00
2012-11-23	Win	(Thailand) Ekmongkol Gaiyanghadao	Petchyindee, Lumpinee Stadium	Bangkok, Thailand	Decision	5	3:00
2012-11-02	Loss	(Thailand) Superlek Wor.Sangprapai	Petchyindee, Lumpinee Stadium	Bangkok, Thailand	Decision	5	3:00
2012-09-26	Win	(Thailand) Songkom Sakhomsin	Wan Kingthong, Rajadamnern Stadium	Bangkok, Thailand	Decision	5	3:00
2012-08-31	Win	(Thailand) Choknamchai Sitjakung	Weerapon, Lumpinee Stadium	Bangkok, Thailand	Decision	5	3:00
2012-07-12	Win	(Thailand) Superlek Wor.Sangprapai	Wanmeechai, Rajadamnern Stadium	Bangkok, Thailand	Decision	5	3:00
2012-06-19	Win	(Thailand) Saengmorakot Mor.Manothamraksa	Petchyindee, Lumpinee Stadium	Bangkok, Thailand	Decision	5	3:00
2012-04-12	Loss	(Thailand) ET Petchsamnuk	Wenmeechai, Rajadamnern Stadium	Bangkok, Thailand	Decision	5	3:00
2012-03-09	Loss	(Thailand) Pentai Singpatong	Lumpinee Champion Krikkrai, Lumpinee Stadium	Bangkok, Thailand	TKO	2	
For the vacant Lumpinee Stadium Flyweight (112 lbs) title
2012-02-03	Win	(Thailand) Songkom Sakhomsin	Petchpiya, Lumpinee Stadium	Bangkok, Thailand	Decision	5	3:00
2011-12-29	Win	(Thailand) Rittewada Sitthikul	Wanmeechai, Rajadamnern Stadium	Bangkok, Thailand	KO	4	
2011-11-15	Loss	(Thailand) Saengmorakot Tawan	Praianan, Lumpinee Stadium	Bangkok, Thailand	Decision	5	3:00
2011-10-13	Loss	(Thailand) Choknamchai Sitjakung	Bangrachan, Rajadamnern Stadium	Bangkok, Thailand	Decision	5	3:00
2011-07-29	Loss	(Thailand) Petchmorakot Wor.Sangprapai	Lumpinee Stadium	Bangkok, Thailand	Decision	5	3:00
2011-06-14	Loss	(Thailand) Yodkhunpon Sitmonchai	Petchyindee, Lumpinee Stadium	Bangkok, Thailand	KO (Punches)	2	
2011-04-15	Win	(Thailand) Hongthonglek Chor.Fasisan	Petchyindee, Lumpinee Stadium	Bangkok, Thailand	Decision	5	3:00
2011-03-08	Loss	(Thailand) Lomtalay SitsoUeng	Lumpinee Champion Krikkrai, Lumpinee Stadium	Bangkok, Thailand	Decision	5	3:00
For the vacant Lumpinee Stadium Light Flyweight (108 lbs) title
2011-02-04	Win	(Thailand) Petchmorakot Wor.Sangprapai	Petchpiya, Lumpinee Stadium	Bangkok, Thailand	Decision	5	3:00
2010-12-29	Loss	(Thailand) Khunsuk P.N.Gym	Wanmeechai, Rajadamnern Stadium	Bangkok, Thailand	Decision	5	3:00
2010-10-05	Win	(Thailand) Khunsuk P.N.Gym	Lumpinee Champion Krikkrai, Lumpinee Stadium	Bangkok, Thailand	Decision	5	3:00
Wins the Thailand (PAT) Light-Flyweight (108 lbs) title.
2010-09-09	Win	(Thailand) Petchpanomrung Sor.Thamarangsri	Wanmeechai, Rajadamnern Stadium	Bangkok, Thailand	Decision	5	3:00
2010-08-03	Loss	(Thailand) Petchpanomrung Sor.Thamarangsri	Petchyindee, Lumpinee Stadium	Bangkok, Thailand	Decision	5	3:00
Loses the Thailand (PAT) Mini-Flyweight (105 lbs) title.
2010-07-09	Win	(Thailand) Wanchai Kiatmuu9	Petchyindee, Lumpinee Stadium	Bangkok, Thailand	Decision	5	3:00
2010-06-04	Win	(Thailand) Petchpanomrung Sor.Thamarangsri	Lumpinee Champion Krikkrai, Lumpinee Stadium	Bangkok, Thailand	Decision (Majority)	5	3:00
2010-05-13	Loss	(Thailand) Prajanchai Por.Phetnamtong	Onesongchai, Lumpinee Stadium	Bangkok, Thailand	Decision	5	3:00
2010-04-02	Win	(Thailand) Songkom Sakhomsin	Weerapon, Lumpinee Stadium	Bangkok, Thailand	Decision	5	3:00
Wins the Thailand (PAT) Mini-Flyweight (105 lbs) title.
2010-03-12	Win	(Thailand) P.5 ExcindiconGmy	Petchyindee, Lumpinee Stadium	Bangkok, Thailand	Decision	5	3:00
2010-02-09	Win	(Thailand) Petchpanomrung Sor.Thamarangsri	Wanwerapon, Lumpinee Stadium	Bangkok, Thailand	Decision	5	3:00
2009-12-18	Loss	(Thailand) P.5 ExcindiconGmy	Petchyindee, Lumpinee Stadium	Bangkok, Thailand	Decision	5	3:00
2009-11-03	Loss	(Thailand) Petchpanomrung Sor.Thamarangsri	Petchyindee, Lumpinee Stadium	Bangkok, Thailand	Decision	5	3:00
2009-10-09	Win	(Thailand) Phetsakon F.A.Group	Petchyindee, Lumpinee Stadium	Bangkok, Thailand	Decision	5	3:00
2009-09-11	Win	(Thailand) Petchpanomrung Sor.Thamarangsri	Petchyindee, Lumpinee Stadium	Bangkok, Thailand	Decision	5	3:00
2009-08-14	Win	(Thailand) Meknoi Sor. Danchai	Petchyindee, Lumpinee Stadium	Bangkok, Thailand	Decision	5	3:00
2009-06-05	Loss	(Thailand) Petchpanomrung Sor.Thamarangsri	Lumpinee Champion Krikkrai, Lumpinee Stadium	Bangkok, Thailand	Decision	5	3:00
2009-03-24	Draw	(Thailand) Saengpraiwan Teedet99	Petchpiya, Lumpinee Stadium	Bangkok, Thailand	Decision	5	3:00
Legend: Win Loss Draw/No contest Notes
