= Kwankhao Mor.Ratanabandit =

Thai Muay Thai fighter

- Born: May 8, 1995 (age 31); Ubon Ratchathani, Thailand
- Other names: Kwankhao Chor Ratchapasadu-Esan (ขวัญข้าว ช.ราชพัสดุอีสาน)
- Nationality: Thai
- Height: 174 cm (5 ft 9 in)
- Weight: 61.0 kg (134.5 lb; 9.61 st)
- Fighting out of: Bangkok, Thailand

Kickboxing record
- Total: 233
- Wins: 190
- Losses: 40
- Draws: 3

Kwankhao (Thai: ขวัญข้าว) is a Thai Muay Thai fighter. He currently is an instructor at Evolve MMA in Singapore.

== Titles and accomplishments ==
- 2014 Thailand 130 lbs Champion
- 2015 Rajadamnern Stadium 130 lbs Champion

== Fight record ==
Fight record
190 Wins, 40 Losses, 3 Draws
Date	Result	Opponent	Event	Location	Method	Round	Time
2016-08-16	Win	(France) Celestin Mendes	Fighting Man	China	Decision	5	3:00
2015-10-30	Loss	(Thailand) Petpanomrung Kiatmuu9	Toyota Vigo Marathon Tournament 2015, Final	Nakhon Ratchasima, Thailand	Decision	3	3:00
For the Toyota Vigo Marathon Tournament title.-64 kg
2015-10-30	Win	(Thailand) Kaimukkao Por.Thairongruangkamai	Toyota Vigo Marathon Tournament 2015, Semi Final	Nakhon Ratchasima, Thailand	Decision	3	3:00
2015-10-30	Win	(United States) Cody Moberly	Toyota Vigo Marathon Tournament 2015, Quarter Final	Nakhon Ratchasima, Thailand	Decision	3	3:00
2015-08-11	Win	(Thailand) Muangthai PKSaenchaimuaythaigym	Petchyindee Fight Fight, Lumpinee Stadium	Bangkok, Thailand	Decision	5	3:00
2015-07-10	Win	(Thailand) Petpanomrung Kiatmuu9	Wanweraphon Fight, Lumpinee Stadium	Bangkok, Thailand	Decision	5	3:00
2015-06-11	Win	(Thailand) Phetmorakot Petchyindee Academy	Rajadamnern Stadium	Bangkok, Thailand	Decision	5	3:00
2015-05-03	Win	(Thailand) Yodtuantong PetchyindeeAcademy	Rangsit Stadium	Thailand	Decision	5	3:00
2015-04-02	Loss	(Thailand) Petpanomrung Kiatmuu9	Wanmitchai + Petchviset Fight, Rajadamnern Stadium	Bangkok, Thailand	Decision	5	3:00
2015-03-06	Loss	(Thailand) Phetmorakot Petchyindee Academy	Lumpinee Stadium	Bangkok, Thailand	Decision	5	3:00
2015-02-05	Win	(Thailand) Phetmorakot Petchyindee Academy	Rajadamnern Stadium	Bangkok, Thailand	Decision	5	3:00
Wins the Rajadamnern Stadium 130 lbs title.
2014-12-28	Win	(Thailand) Phetpanomrong Mor.Ratanabandit	Rangsit Stadium	Thailand	Decision	5	3:00
2014-11-25	Win	(Thailand) Phet Utong Or. Kwanmuang	Lumpinee Stadium	Bangkok, Thailand	Decision	5	3:00
2014-11-02	Win	(Thailand) Yodtuanthong Petchyindee	Rangsit Stadium	Rangsit, Thailand	Decision	5	3:00
2014-09-07	Loss	(Thailand) Dejnarong Wor.Sunthornon	Rangsit Stadium	Rangsit, Thailand	Decision	5	3:00
2014-07-08	Win	(Thailand) Kaimukkao Por.Thairongruangkamai	Lumpinee Stadium	Bangkok, Thailand	Decision	5	3:00
2014-06-11	Draw	(Thailand) Kaimukkao Por.Thairongruangkamai	Rajadamnern Stadium	Bangkok, Thailand	Decision	5	3:00
2014-05-06	Win	(Thailand) Kaimukkao Por.Thairongruangkamai	Lumpinee Stadium	Bangkok, Thailand	Decision	5	3:00
Wins the Thailand (PAT) Super Featherweight title (130 lbs).
2014-02-28	Loss	(Thailand) Phetmorakot Petchyindee Academy	Lumpinee Stadium	Bangkok, Thailand	Decision	5	3:00
For the Lumpinee Stadium 130 lbs title.
2014-01-24	Win	(Thailand) Dechnarong Wor Suntoranon	Lumpinee Stadium	Bangkok, Thailand	Decision	5	3:00
2014-01-03	Win	(Thailand) Pornsanae Sitmonchai	Lumpinee Stadium	Bangkok, Thailand	KO (elbow)	3	
2013-11-29	Win	(Thailand) Chatchainoi Sor Prasopchoke	Lumpinee Stadium	Bangkok, Thailand	Decision	5	3:00
2013-10-11	Loss	(Thailand) Sam-A Gaiyanghadao	Lumpinee Stadium	Bangkok, Thailand	Decision	5	3:00
2013-09-21	Win	(France) Karim Bennoui	La Nuit des Challenges 12	Saint-Fons, France	Decision	5	3:00
2013-09-03	Win	(Thailand) Pornsanae Sitmonchai	Lumpinee Stadium	Bangkok, Thailand	TKO (cuts)	4	
2013-07-05	Win	(Thailand) Saksuriya Kaiyanghadao	Lumpinee Stadium	Bangkok, Thailand	Decision	5	3:00
2013-05-17	Win	(Thailand) Newwangjan Pagonponsurin	Lumpinee Stadium	Bangkok, Thailand	Decision	5	3:00
2013-04-10	Loss	(Thailand) Saksuriya Kaiyanghadao	Rajadamnern Stadium	Bangkok, Thailand	Decision	5	3:00
2013-02-22	Loss	(Thailand) Pornsanae Sitmonchai	Rajadamnern Stadium	Bangkok, Thailand	Decision	5	3:00
2013-01-08	Loss	(Thailand) Kangkenlek SBP Car Network	Rajadamnern Stadium	Bangkok, Thailand	Decision	5	3:00
2012-11-03	Loss	(Thailand) Pornsanae Sitmonchai		Thailand	TKO	3	
2012-10-02	Win	(Thailand) Nontakit Tor.Morsi	Lumpinee Stadium	Bangkok, Thailand	KO (Left Elbow)	4	
2012-09-04	Loss	(Thailand) Tingthong Chor Kowyuha-isuzu	Lumpinee Stadium	Bangkok, Thailand	Decision	5	3:00
2012-07-31	Loss	(Thailand) Palangtip Nor.Sripueng	Lumpinee Stadium	Bangkok, Thailand	Decision	5	3:00
2012-05-25	Loss	(Thailand) Yodkhunpon Sitmonchai	Lumpinee Stadium	Bangkok, Thailand	KO (Punches)		
2012-05-02	Win	(Thailand) Rungpetch Kiatjaroenchai	Rajadamnern Stadium	Bangkok, Thailand	Decision	5	3:00
2012-04-03	Loss	(Thailand) Yodkhunpon Sitmonchai	Lumpinee Stadium	Bangkok, Thailand	Decision	5	3:00
2012-02-16	Win	(Thailand) Yodpetch Wor.Sangprapai	Rajadamnern Stadium	Bangkok, Thailand	KO	4	
2012-01-06	Loss	(Thailand) Rungpetch Kiatjaroenchai	Lumpinee Stadium	Bangkok, Thailand	Decision	5	3:00
2011-10-25	Win	(Thailand) Kaotam Lookprabaht	Lumpinee Stadium	Bangkok, Thailand	Decision	5	3:00
2011-09-30	Win	(Thailand) Lookman Fonjarngchonburee	Lumpinee Stadium	Bangkok, Thailand	KO (Right Elbow)	2	
2011-07-28	Win	(Thailand) Mapichit Sitsongpeenong	Rajadamnern Stadium	Bangkok, Thailand	Decision	5	3:00
2011-06-21	Win	(Thailand) Bunluedetch Sor.Prasobchok	Rajadamnern Stadium	Bangkok, Thailand	Decision	5	3:00
2011-05-24	Loss	(Thailand) Petpanomrung Sor.Thamarangsri	Petchpiya, Lumpinee Stadium	Bangkok, Thailand	Decision	5	3:00
2011-03-16	Loss	(Thailand) Orono Yor.Yong	Rajadamnern Stadium	Bangkok, Thailand	Decision	5	3:00
2011-01-26	Win	(Thailand) Riangphet Phetfergus	Rajadamnern Stadium	Bangkok, Thailand	Decision	5	3:00
2011-01-05	Win	(Thailand) Kumarntae Lookprabaht	Rajadamnern Stadium	Bangkok, Thailand	Decision	5	3:00
2010-09-10	Win	(Thailand) Petchsurat Sor.Yupinda	Lumpinee Stadium	Bangkok, Thailand	Decision	5	3:00
2010-08-10	Win	(Thailand) Nokkrajib Sitporadd	Lumpinee Stadium	Bangkok, Thailand	Decision	5	3:00
2010-06-04	Loss	(Thailand) Siangmorakot Kiatrachanok	Lumpinee Stadium	Bangkok, Thailand	Decision	5	3:00
2010-05-07	Win	(Thailand) Petmai Sor.Arisa	Lumpinee Stadium	Bangkok, Thailand	Decision	5	3:00
2010-02-16	Win	(Thailand) Thongchai Sor.Tummarungsi	Lumpinee Stadium	Bangkok, Thailand	Decision	5	3:00
2010-01-02	Loss	(Thailand) Meknoi Sor.Darnchai	Omnoi Stadium	Bangkok, Thailand	Decision	5	3:00
2009-11-24	Win	(Thailand) Denvittaya Petsimean	Lumpinee Stadium	Bangkok, Thailand	Decision	5	3:00
2009-03-21	Loss	(Thailand) Kiatsak Sit-oodpiboon	Lumpinee Stadium	Bangkok, Thailand	Decision	5	3:00
Legend: Win Loss Draw/No contest Notes
