= Abraham Vidales =

Mexican kickboxer and martial artist

- Born: Abraham Vidales Castro; October 18, 1994 (age 32); Monterrey, Mexico
- Other names: Ham
- Height: 1.81 m (5 ft 11 1/2 in)
- Weight: 65 kg (143 lb; 10.2 st)
- Style: Muay Thai, Kickboxing
- Stance: Orthodox
- Fighting out of: Monterrey, Mexico
- Team: Living Legacy Muay Thai, VFS Academy
- Trainer: Javier Garza Cantu
- Years active: 2016–present

Kickboxing record
- Total: 28
- Wins: 22
- By knockout: 17
- Losses: 6
- By knockout: 2

Other information
- University: Master's degree in dentistry at the Autonomous University of Nuevo León

Abraham Vidales (born October 18, 1994) is a Mexican kickboxer and Muay Thai fighter who competes in the Glory Kickboxing featherweight division.

As of December 2023 he was ranked tenth in Super-featherweight kickboxer in the world by Beyond Kickboxing.

== Kickboxing career ==
It was announced on August 14, 2018, that Vidales had signed with Glory. He successfully made his debut with the promotion at Glory 61: New York on November 2, 2018, as he was able to stop Houssam El Kasri midway through the opening round. Vidales won his next three fights with the promotion, but came up shot against the former Glory featherweight champion Serhiy Adamchuk at Glory 72: Chicago on November 23, 2019, who stopped him in the third and final round of the contest.

Vidales faced Amine Ballafrikh for the Triumphant Featherweight championship at TRIUMPHANT 11 on June 12, 2021. He captured the title by a fourth-round technical knockout.

Vidales challenged the Glory Featherweight champion Petpanomrung Kiatmuu9 at Glory: Collision 4 on October 8, 2022. He lost the fight by unanimous decision.

Vidales faced WGP Kickboxing champion Tomás Aguirre at Glory Rivals 5 on January 28, 2023, in Tulum, Mexico. He won the fight by unanimous decision.

Vidales faced Ahmad Chikh Mousa at Glory: Collision 6 on November 4, 2023. He won the fight by a first-round technical knockout.

Vidales was booked to face the former RISE Lightweight (−62.5 kg) champion Kento Haraguchi at RISE World Series 2023 - Final Round on December 26, 2023. He lost the fight by a second-round knockout.

Vidales faced Miguel Trindade at Glory 93 on July 20, 2024. He lost the fight by unanimous decision.

Vidales faced Chadd Collins in the quarterfinals of the GLORY RISE Featherweight Grand Prix, held on December 21, 2024, in Chiba, Japan. He lost the fight by unanimous decision.

== Titles and accomplishments ==
- International Sport Kickboxing Association
  - 2018 ISKA Muay Thai Mexico Welterweight (−67 kg) Championship
- Triumphant Combat Sports
  - 2022 TRIUMPHANT Featherweight (−65 kg) Championship
- World Boxing Council Muay Thai
  - 2025 WBC Muay Thai North American Welterweight Championship
  - 2026 WBC Muay Thai Americas Welterweight Championship

== Fight record ==
Kickboxing and Muaythai record
22 Wins (17 (T)KOs), 6 Losses
Date	Result	Opponent	Event	Location	Method	Round	Time
2026-12-20		(Japan) Motoyasu	RISE World Series 2026 Tokyo Final	Tokyo, Japan			
2026-05-15	Win	(Colombia) Daniel Torres	Kingdom Fight 23	Monterrey, Mexico	KO (Right hook)		
Wins the inaugural WBC Muay Thai Americas Welterweight title.
2026-03-28	Loss	(Thailand) Petpanomrung Kiatmuu9	Glory 106 - Last Featherweight Standing Quarterfinals	Tokyo, Japan	Decision (Unanimous)	3	3:00
2025-12-13	Win	(Italy) Achraf Aasila	Glory Collision 8 - Last Featherweight Standing Second Round	Arnhem, Netherlands	Decision (Unanimous)	3	3:00
2025-05-23	Win	(United States) Ethan Geffen	Kingdom Fight 21	Monterrey, Mexico	TKO (Punches)	3	1:35
Wins the vacant WBC Muay Thai North American Welterweight title.
2024-12-21	Loss	(Australia) Chadd Collins	GLORY RISE Featherweight Grand Prix, Quarterfinals	Chiba, Japan	Decision (Unanimous)	3	3:00
2024-07-20	Loss	(Portugal) Miguel Trindade	Glory 93	Rotterdam, Netherlands	Decision (Unanimous)	3	3:00
2023-12-16	Loss	(Japan) Kento Haraguchi	RISE World Series 2023 - Final Round	Tokyo, Japan	KO (Right cross)	2	1:49
2023-11-04	Win	(Germany) Ahmad Chikh Mousa	Glory: Collision 6	Arnhem, Netherlands	TKO (Punches)	1	1:13
2023-01-28	Win	(Argentina) Tomás Aguirre	Glory Rivals 5	Tulum, Mexico	Decision (Unanimous)	3	3:00
2022-10-08	Loss	(Thailand) Petpanomrung Kiatmuu9	Glory: Collision 4	Arnhem, Netherlands	Decision (Unanimous)	5	3:00
For the Glory Featherweight Championship.
2022-05-20	Win	(Thailand) Denkornburi Liang.Prasert	Fighter X	Pattaya, Thailand	KO (Left hook to the body)	2	1:50
2021-06-12	Win	(United States) Amine Ballafrikh	TRIUMPHANT 11	Miami, USA	TKO	4	
Wins Triumphant Featherweight title.
2019-11-23	Loss	(Ukraine) Serhiy Adamchuk	Glory 72: Chicago	Chicago, USA	TKO (Referee Stoppage)	3	1:27
2019-09-28	Win	(United States) Justin Greskiewicz	Glory 68: Miami	Miami, United States	TKO (4 Knockdowns)	3	1:26
2019-07-05	Win	(United States) Trevor Ragin	Glory 67: Orlando	Orlando, United States	Decision (Unanimous)	3	3:00
2019-02-01	Win	(United States) Dimitre Ivy	Glory 63: Houston	Houston, USA	TKO	2	2:34
2018-11-02	Win	(Morocco) Houssam El Kasri	Glory 61: New York	New York, United States	TKO (Left hook)	1	1:48
2018-05-31	Win	(Mexico)		Mexico	TKO (body Kick)	1	2:00
2018-03-08	Win	(Mexico) Luis Martinez		Mexico			
2017-12-16	Win	(Mexico) Alexis Padilla	Iron Fist	Xalapa, Mexico	TKO (Corner stoppage)	3	
Wins ISKA Muay Thai Mexican Welterweight title.
2017-09-28	Win	(Mexico) David Mota	Kingdom Fight	Monterrey, Mexico	KO (Low kick)	1	
2017-04-28	Win	(Mexico) Eduardo Quintero	Kingdom Fight	Mexico	Decision	5	3:00
2016-09-24	Win	(Mexico) Daniel Rico	YOKKAO Next Generation	Xalapa, Mexico			
2016-09-02	Win	(Mexico) Omar Vela	Kingdom Fight	Monterrey, Mexico	Decision	5	3:00
2016-06-03	Win	(Mexico) Yair Ortiz	Impacto Total XI	Saltillo, Mexico	TKO	1	
2016-05-13	Win	(Mexico)	Kingdom Fight	Monterrey, Mexico			
2016-04-06	Win	(Mexico)		Mexico			
Legend: Win Loss Draw/No contest Notes

== See also ==
- List of male kickboxers
