= Serhii Adamchuk =

Ukrainian kickboxer and mixed martial arts (MMA) fighter

- Born: Сергій Адамчук; February 7, 1990 (age 36); Kryvyi Rih, Ukraine
- Other names: Sergey Adamchuk
- Height: 174 cm (5 ft 8 1/2 in)
- Weight: 67.0 kg (147.7 lb; 10.55 st)
- Division: Welterweight; Super Welterweight
- Reach: 68.5 in (174 cm)
- Style: Sambo; Kickboxing
- Stance: Southpaw
- Fighting out of: Amsterdam, Netherlands
- Team: Mike's Gym
- Trainer: Mike Passenier

Kickboxing record
- Total: 84
- Wins: 46
- By knockout: 17
- Losses: 20
- Draws: 0
- No contests: 18

Mixed martial arts record
- Total: 16
- Wins: 11
- By knockout: 4
- By submission: 1
- By decision: 6
- Losses: 5
- By knockout: 1
- By submission: 1
- By decision: 3

Other information
- Boxing record from BoxRec
- Mixed martial arts record from Sherdog

Serhii Adamchuk (born February 7, 1990) is a Ukrainian kickboxer. A professional competitor since 2008, he is a former Glory featherweight champion and three time featherweight title challenger.

Combat Press ranked him as a top ten featherweight kickboxer in the world between December 2015 and February 2017, June 2018 and March 2019, as well as between February 2021 and January 2022. He peaked at #2 in July 2016.

== Kickboxing career ==
=== Glory ===
==== Early promotional career ====
Adamchuk made his Glory debut against the future lightweight champion Marat Grigorian at Glory 22: Lille on June 5, 2015, in the reserve bout of the 2015 Lightweight Contender Tournament. Adamchuk stepped in on a days' notice, having been offered the opportunity to face Grigorian just 24 hours before the fight was supposed to take place. He won the bout by unanimous decision.

Adamchuk departed from Glory for his next bout, as he faced Kazuya Akimoto in the reserve match of the K-1 World GP 2015 -70kg Championship Tournament on July 4, 2015. He won the fight by split decision, with scores of 29–28, 29–30 and 30–29.

Adamchuk faced Anvar Boynazarov at Bellator MMA & Glory: Dynamite 1, a Glory and Bellator MMA cross-promotional event, on September 19, 2015. He won the fight by unanimous decision.

==== Glory Featherweight champion ====
These three victories earned Adamchuk the right to challenge Gabriel Varga for the Glory Featherweight Championship. The title bout was scheduled as the main event of the Glory 25: Milan Superfight Series, which took place on November 6, 2015. Adamchuk won the fight by unanimous decision.

Adamchuk made his first title defense against Mosab Amrani, who had earned his right to challenge for the championship by winning the 2015 Glory Featherweight Contender tournament, at Glory 28: Paris on March 12, 2016. He retained the title by unanimous decision.

Adamchuk made his second title defense in a rematch with Gabriel Varga, whom he had previously beaten to capture the title, Glory 32: Virginia on July 22, 2016. He lost the fight by majority decision, with scores of 48–47, 48–46 and 48–48.

==== Second Glory title challenge ====
Adamchuk faced Giga Chikadze in the semifinals of the 2016 Featherweight Contender Tournament, held at Glory 33: New Jersey on September 9, 2016. He lost the fight by split decision, with scores of 29–28, 29–28, 28–29. Adamchuk participated in the 2017 Featherweight Contender Tournament as well, which was held at Glory 39: Brussels on March 25, 2017, and was booked to face Nafi Bilalovski in the semifinal bout. Despite beating Bilalovski by unanimous decision, Adamchuk lost the final bout of the one-day tournament, as Petchpanomrung Kiatmookao beat him by split decision.

Adamchuk next faced Dylan Salvador in a top contender bout at Glory 42: Paris on October 6, 2017. He won the fight by unanimous decision. Beating Salvador earned Adamchuk his second title challenge opportunity, as he was booked to face Robin van Roosmalen for the Glory Featherweight Championship at Glory 45: Amsterdam on September 30, 2017. He lost the fight by unanimous decision, with three judges scored the fight 48–47 for Van Roosmalen, while the remaining two judges awarded him a 49–46 scorecard.

==== Third Glory title challenge ====
On March 3, 2018, it was revealed that Glory would hold the 2018 Featherweight Contender Tournament at Glory 53: Lille on May 12, 2018. Adamchuk was booked to face Azize Hlali in the tournament semifinals, while the other pairing saw Victor Pinto face Buray Bozaryilmaz. Adamchuk beat Hlali by unanimous decision, and advanced to the finals, where he faced Victor Pinto. Adamchuk won the tournament final by unanimous decision as well.

After extending his winning streak to three consecutive fights with a unanimous decision win against Anvar Boynazarov at Glory 56: Denver on August 10, 2018, Adamchuk was awarded the opportunity to challenge the Glory Featherweight champion Petchpanomrung Kiatmookao, who had previously beaten Adamchuk by split decision at Glory 39: Brussels. The title bout was scheduled as the main event of Glory 63: Houston on February 1, 2019. Petchpanomrung was more convincing in their second meeting, as he won the fight by unanimous decision, with all five judges awarding him a 50–45 scorecard.

==== Fourth Glory title challenge ====
After failing in his third title bid, Adamchuk was booked to face Kevin VanNostrand at Glory 67: Orlando on July 5, 2019. He lost the fight by unanimous decision. Adamchuk bounced back from this loss with a second-round technical knockout of Abraham Vidales at Glory 72: Chicago on November 23, 2019. It was his first stoppage victory since July 6, 2014. Adamchuk next faced Aleksei Ulianov at Glory Collision 2 on December 21, 2019. He won the fight by split decision.

Adamchuk was booked to challenge Petchpanomrung Kiatmookao for the Glory Featherweight Championship at Glory 75: Utrecht on February 29, 2020. It was Adamchuk's fourth Glory title challenge and the third time that he fought Petchpanomrung, having already lost to him on two previous occasions. Petchpanomrung won the fight by unanimous decision, with all five judges scoring the bout 49–45 in his favor.

==== Later featherweight career ====
Adamchuk faced Aleksei Ulianov in a rematch at Glory Collision 3 on October 23, 2021. He lost the fight by split decision.

Adamchuk faced the former RISE lightweight Kento Haraguchi at RISE WORLD SERIES / Glory Rivals 4 on December 25, 2022. He lost the fight by unanimous decision.

Adamchuk faced Meng Gaofeng for the Wu Lin Feng World -65 kg title at Wu Lin Feng 1000th Broadcast Celebration on November 25, 2023. He lost the fight by unanimous decision.

Adamchuk faced Adrian Maxim at K-1 Fighting Network Romania 2024 on June 13, 2024. The fight was ruled a no contest, due to a clash of heads in the opening round.

== Titles and accomplishments ==
=== Amateur ===
- World Association of Kickboxing Organizations
  - 2007 W.A.K.O. World Championships in Belgrade, Serbia (bronze) -60 kg (K-1 Rules)

=== Professional ===
- K-1
  - 2026 K-1 World MAX in Bucharest Tournament winner
- Glory
  - 2018 Glory Featherweight Contender Tournament winner
  - 2015 Glory Featherweight (-65 kg/143.3 lb) Champion (one time; one defense)
- International Sport Karate Association
  - 2015 ISKA Super Welterweight(70 kg) Kickboxing European Champion

== Kickboxing record ==
Kickboxing record
46 wins (17 KO), 20 losses, 1 no contest
Date	Result	Opponent	Event	Location	Method	Round	Time
2026-10-10	Loss	(Morocco) Ilias Zougarry	Sportmani Events – ‘Don’t Call It A Comeback II’	Almere, Netherlands	Decision (unanimous)	3	3:00
2026-09-12	Loss	(Poland) Kacper Muszyński	K-1 World MAX 2026 - World Tournament Opening Round	Tokyo, Japan	Ext.R Decision (Split)	4	3:00
Fails to qualify for the 2026 K-1 World MAX World Championship Tournament Final.
2026-05-02	Loss	(Morocco) Anouar Afakir	8TKO #27	Almere, Netherlands	Decision (unanimous)	5	3:00
For the vacant Enfusion World Lightweight (-70kg) title.
2026-04-03	Win	(Moldova) Vitalie Matei	K-1 World MAX 2026 in Bucharest, Final	Bucharest, Romania	Decision (unanimous)	3	3:00
Wins the K-1 World MAX 2026 in Bucharest Tournament and qualifies for 2026 K-1 World MAX Final 16.
2026-04-03	Win	(Romania) Albert Enache	K-1 World MAX 2026 in Bucharest, Semifinals	Bucharest, Romania	TKO (punches and low kick)	2	2:20
2026-04-03	Win	(Romania) Andrei Varga	K-1 World MAX 2026 in Bucharest, Quarterfinals	Bucharest, Romania	TKO (2 knockdowns)	1	2:30
2025-11-22	Win	(Senegal) Abdoulaye Diallo	Fight Clubbing 39	Pescara, Italy	Decision (unanimous)	3	3:00
2025-10-04	Loss	(Croatia) Andrej Kedveš	FNC Knockout 2	Maribor, Slovenia	Decision	3	3:00
2025-05-17	Loss	(Germany) Johannes Baas	Mix Fight Championship 52	Frankfurt, Germany	Decision	3	3:00
2024-07-27	Win	(China) Han Tianxiang	Wu Lin Feng 546	China	Decision	3	3:00
2024-06-13	NC	(Romania) Adrian Maxim	K-1 Fighting Network Romania 2024	Galați, Romania	Doctor stoppage (head clash)	1	2:47
2024-02-16	Win	(Australia) Matthew Stevens	AFS: Australia vs The World	Dubai, UAE	Decision (unanimous)	3	3:00
2023-11-25	Loss	(China) Meng Gaofeng	Wu Lin Feng 1000th Broadcast Celebration	Tangshan, China	Decision (unanimous)	5	3:00
For the Wu Lin Feng World -65kg title.
2022-12-25	Loss	(Japan) Kento Haraguchi	RISE WORLD SERIES / Glory Rivals 4	Tokyo, Japan	Decision (unanimous)	3	3:00
2021-10-23	Loss	(Russia) Aleksei Ulianov	Glory Collision 3	Arnhem, Netherlands	Decision (split)	3	3:00
2020-02-29	Loss	(Thailand) Petchpanomrung Kiatmookao	Glory 75: Utrecht	Utrecht, Netherlands	Decision (unanimous)	5	3:00
For the Glory Featherweight Championship
2019-12-21	Win	(Russia) Aleksei Ulianov	Glory Collision 2	Arnhem, Netherlands	Decision (split)	3	3:00
2019-11-23	Win	(Mexico) Abraham Vidales	Glory 72: Chicago	Chicago, USA	TKO (referee stoppage)	3	1:27
2019-07-05	Loss	(United States) Kevin VanNostrand	Glory 67: Orlando	Orlando, USA	Decision (unanimous)	3	3:00
2019-02-01	Loss	(Thailand) Petchpanomrung Kiatmookao	Glory 63: Houston	Houston, USA	Decision (unanimous)	5	3:00
For the Glory Featherweight Championship
2018-08-10	Win	(Uzbekistan) Anvar Boynazarov	Glory 56: Denver	Colorado	Decision (unanimous)	3	3:00
2018-05-12	Win	(France) Victor Pinto	Glory 53: Lille Featherweight Contender Tournament, Final	Lille, France	Decision (unanimous)	3	3:00
Wins the Glory Featherweight Contender Tournament.
2018-05-12	Win	(France) Azize Hlali	Glory 53: Lille Featherweight Contender Tournament, Semi-Finals	Lille, France	Decision (unanimous)	3	3:00
2017-09-30	Loss	(Netherlands) Robin van Roosmalen	Glory 45: Amsterdam	Amsterdam, Netherlands	Decision (unanimous)	5	3:00
For the Glory Featherweight Championship.
2017-06-10	Win	(France) Dylan Salvador	Glory 42: Paris	Paris, France	Decision (unanimous)	3	3:00
2017-03-25	Loss	(Thailand) Petchpanomrung Kiatmookao	Glory 39: Brussels Featherweight Contender Tournament, Final	Brussels, Belgium	Decision (split)	3	3:00
2017-03-25	Win	(Belgium) Nafi Bilalovski	Glory 39: Brussels Featherweight Contender Tournament, Semi-Finals	Brussels, Belgium	Decision (unanimous)	3	3:00
2016-09-09	Loss	(Georgia (country)) Giga Chikadze	Glory 33: New Jersey Featherweight Contender Tournament, Semi-Finals	Trenton, New Jersey	Decision (split)	3	3:00
2016-07-22	Loss	(Canada) Gabriel Varga	Glory 32: Virginia	Norfolk, Virginia	Decision (majority)	5	3:00
Losses the Glory Featherweight Championship.
2016-04-16	Win	(Denmark) Mohammed El Mir	Glory 29: Copenhagen	Copenhagen, Denmark	Decision (unanimous)	3	3:00
2016-03-12	Win	(Morocco) Mosab Amrani	Glory 28: Paris	Paris, France	Decision (unanimous)	5	3:00
Defends the Glory Featherweight Championship.
2015-11-06	Win	(Canada) Gabriel Varga	Glory 25: Milan	Monza, Italy	Decision (unanimous)	5	3:00
Wins the Glory Featherweight Championship.
2015-09-19	Win	(Uzbekistan) Anvar Boynazarov	Bellator MMA & Glory: Dynamite 1	San Jose, California, USA	Decision (unanimous)	3	3:00
2015-07-04	Win	(Japan) Kazuya Akimoto	K-1 World GP 2015 -70kg Championship Tournament, Reserve Match	Tokyo, Japan	Decision (split)	3	3:00
2015-06-05	Win	(Armenia) Marat Grigorian	Glory 22: Lille Lightweight Contender Tournament, Reserve Match	Lille, France	Decision (unanimous)	3	3:00
2015-04-11	Win	(Belgium) Dino Kacar	Choc des Mondes	Caudry, France	Decision (unanimous)	3	3:00
Wins the ISKA Super Welterweight (-70kg) Kickboxing European Title.
2014-07-06	Win	(Morocco) Lahoucine Idouche	Choc des Mondes	France	KO (left hook)	3	1:29
2013-05-29	Loss	(Thailand) Deo Phetsangkhat	GPRO 12: 70 kg qualification tournament, Semi Finals	Russia			
2013-04-06	Win	(Russia) Artem Pashporin	GPRO 11	Russia	Decision	3	3:00
2012-04-21	Loss	(Poland) Pawel Biszczak	GPRO 5: 76 kg final tournament, Quarter finals	Russia	Decision	3	3:00
2012-03-03	Win	(Russia) Vladimir Tarasov	GPRO 4	Ukraine	Decision	3	3:00
Wins the WBC OPBU 71 kg Kickboxing World Title.
2011-09-29	Loss	(Russia) Andrey Perepelkin	GPRO 2: 76 kg qualification tournament, Final	Russia	Decision	3	3:00
2011-09-29	Win	(Russia) Nikolai Bubnov	GPRO 2: 76 kg qualification tournament, Semi Finals	Russia	Decision	3	3:00
2009-05-21	Win	(Russia) Sergey Lipinets	BARS: Russia vs Ukraine	Russia, Moscow	KO	2	
2008-00-00	Win	(Belarus) Yury Satsuk	PMMA: Kyiv mayor's cup	Ukraine, Kyiv	Decision		
Legend: Win Loss Draw/no contest Notes

Amateur kickboxing record
Date	Result	Opponent	Event	Location	Method	Round	Time
2007-09-	Loss	(Russia) Elbar Umarakaev	2007 W.A.K.O. World Championships, Semi Finals	Belgrade, Serbia	Decision	3	2:00
Wins 2007 WAKO World Championships K-1 -60kg Bronze Medal.
2007-09-	Win	(Belarus) Yury Dziatlau	2007 W.A.K.O. World Championships, Quarter Finals	Belgrade, Serbia	Decision	3	2:00
Legend: Win Loss Draw/no contest Notes

== Mixed martial arts record ==
Professional record breakdown
16 matches	11 wins	5 losses
By knockout	4	1
By submission	1	1
By decision	6	3

Res.	Record	Opponent	Method	Event	Date	Round	Time	Location	Notes
Win	11–5	Vlad Khalevich	Decision (unanimous)	GEFC - Battle on the Gold Mountain	21 December 2013	2	5:00	Uzhhorod, Ukraine	
Win	10–5	Roman Gusev	Submission (rear-naked choke)	ECSF - Gladiator's Battle 2	30 March 2013	1	0:20	Kyiv, Ukraine	
Win	9–5	Yagub Zamanov	Decision (unanimous)	ECSF - Gladiator's Battle 2	28 April 2012	2	5:00	Kyiv, Ukraine	
Loss	8–5	Vadim Khaitulov	TKO (corner stoppage)	M-1 Ukraine - Superfinal Grand Prix	17 December 2011	1	4:17	Kyiv, Ukraine	
Win	8–4	Maciej Polok	Decision (majority)	Polish MMA Championships Finals	5 November 2011	3	5:00	Chorzów, Poland	
Win	7–4	Yuri Saakyan	Decision (unanimous)	M-1 Ukraine - Battle of Minsk	15 October 2011	2	5:00	Minsk, Belarus	
Win	6–4	Sergey Sinkevich	KO (punch)	M-1 Global - M-1 Ukraine European Battle	4 June 2011	2	2:47	Kyiv, Ukraine	
Win	5–4	Vlad Cherbadzhi	KO (punch)	M-1 Ukraine - International Club Grand Prix 1	2 April 2011	1	4:49	Kyiv, Ukraine	
Win	4–4	Yuri Saakyan	Decision (unanimous)	M-1 Selection Ukraine 2010 - The Finals	12 February 2011	3	5:00	Kyiv, Ukraine	
Loss	3–4	Evgeni Khavilov	Decision (unanimous)	M-1 Selection Ukraine 2010 - Round 6	6 November 2010	3	5:00	Kyiv, Ukraine	
Win	3–3	Alexander Zinchenko	Decision (unanimous)	M-1 Selection Ukraine 2010 - Clash of the Titans	18 September 2010	2	5:00	Kyiv, Ukraine	
Loss	2–3	Mairbek Taisumov	Submission (rear-naked choke)	M-1 Selection 2010 - Eastern Europe Finals	22 July 2010	1	3:04	Moscow, Russia	
Win	2–2	Eduard Pestrak	TKO (punches)	M-1 Selection Ukraine 2010 - Round 2	7 May 2010	1	0:44	Kyiv, Ukraine	
Win	1–2	Shota Akulashvili	TKO (corner stoppage)	M-1 Ukraine - 2009 Selections 4	24 December 2009	1	5:00	Kyiv, Ukraine	
Loss	0–2	Mikhail Lysyuchenko	Decision (unanimous)	M-1 Ukraine - 2009 Selections 1	20 September 2009	2	5:00	Kyiv, Ukraine	
Loss	0–1	Kirill Krikunov	Decision (unanimous)	M-1 Ukraine - Lviv Open Cup	14 June 2009	2	5:00	Lviv, Ukraine	

== See also ==
- List of male kickboxers
