= Glunder =

Glunder is a surname. Notable people with the surname include:

- Massaro Glunder (born 1994), Dutch kickboxer
- Rodney Glunder (born 1975), Dutch-Surinamese martial artist
