= Zakaria Zouggary =

Dutch-Moroccan kickboxer (born 1995)

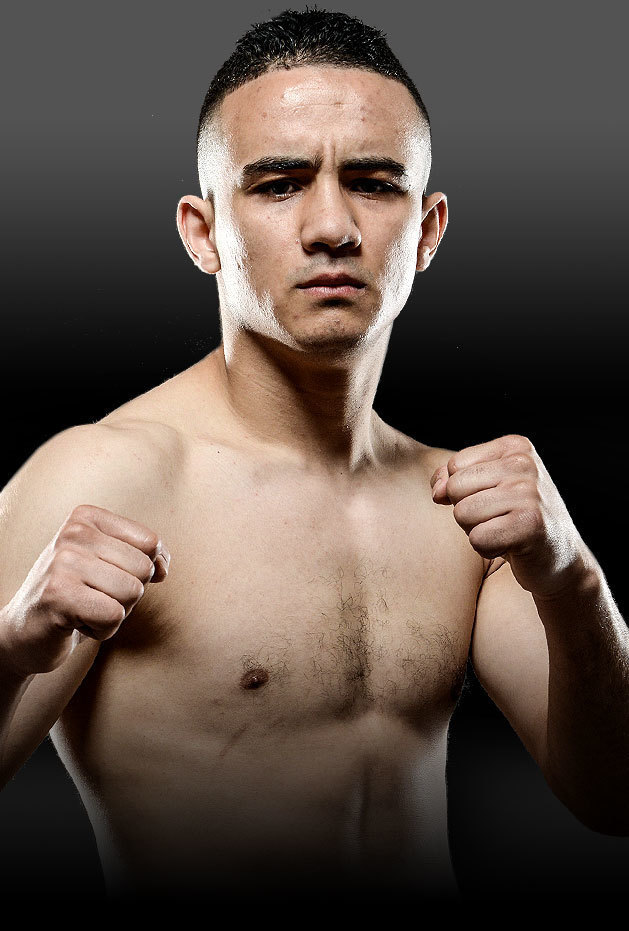
- Born: June 22, 1995 (age 31); Rotterdam, Netherlands
- Nationality: Dutch; Moroccan
- Height: 170 cm (5 ft 7 in)
- Weight: 65 kg (143 lb; 10 st 3 lb)
- Division: Featherweight
- Style: Kickboxing
- Stance: Orthodox
- Fighting out of: Morocco
- Team: Melvin Fighting Factory; Oude Westen Gym
- Trainer: Khalid Chennouf
- Years active: 2013-present

Kickboxing record
- Total: 41
- Wins: 33
- By knockout: 16
- Losses: 7
- By knockout: 4
- Draws: 1

Zakaria Zouggary (born June 6, 1995) is a Dutch-Moroccan kickboxer, currently competing in the featherweight division of Glory. As of April 2023, he ranked the #1 Glory featherweight.

He was ranked as a top ten featherweight kickboxer by LiverKick from March 2015 to March 2016, and by Combat Press between November 2019 and April 2020.

== Kickboxing career ==
=== Shoot Boxing ===
Zouggary participated in the 2014 SHOOT BOXING World S-Cup -65 kg tournament. He overcame Bovy Sor Udomson by a second-round technical knockout in the quarterfinals of the one-day tournament and Houcine Bennoui by a second-round knockout to earn his place in the finals, opposite the two-weight SHOOT BOXING champion Hiroaki Suzuki. Zouggary lost the fight by a fifth-round technical knockout, after the fight was twice ruled a draw.

Zouggary faced Hiroki Shishido at SHOOT BOXING 2015～SB30th Anniversary～ act.1 on February 21, 2015. He won the fight by unanimous decision. Zouggary next faced Yuki at RISE 105 on May 31, 2015. He won the fight by a second-round technical knockout. In his third fight of the year, at SHOOT BOXING 2015～SB30th Anniversary～ act.3 on June 21, 2015, Zouggary faced Chuchai Hadesworkout. He won the fight by unanimous decision. Zouggary faced Hiroaki Suzuki at 30th ANNIVERSARY “GROUND ZERO TOKYO 2015” on December 1, 2015, in his fourth and final bout of the year. He won the fight by unanimous decision. His four-fight win streak was snapped by Koji Yoshimoto at RISE 109 on January 31, 2016, who beat him by a third-round technical knockout.

Zouggary faced Yosuke Mizuochi at NO KICK NO LIFE 2016 on March 12, 2016. He won the fight by a fifth-round technical knockout. Zouggary extended his win streak to three fights with technical knockouts of Wang Zhiwei at Wu Lin Feng 2016: WFL x Fight League - China vs Morocco on August 4, 2016, and UMA at SHOOT BOXING 2016 act.4 on September 19, 2016.

Zouggary took part in the 2016 SHOOT BOXING World S-Cup Super Lightweight (-65 kg) one-day Tournament. He was booked to face Hiroto Yamaguchi in the quarterfinals. Zouggary won the fight by a first-round technical knockout and advanced to the semifinals, where he faced Tapruwan Hadesworkout. He won the fight by unanimous decision, which earned him a place in the finals opposite MASAYA. Zouggary captured the tournament title by a second-round technical knockout.

Zouggary challenged the Enfusion -67 kg champion Ilias Bulaid at Enfusion Live 46 on February 18, 2017. He lost the fight by decision. He rebounded from this loss with a majority decision win over Kaito Ono at SHOOT BOXING 2017 act.2 on April 8, 2017.

=== GLORY ===
Zouggary made his Glory debut against Yetkin Özkul at Glory 41: Holland on May 20, 2017. He won the fight by unanimous decision. Zouggary next faced Massaro Glunder at Glory 45: Amsterdam on September 30, 2017. He once again won by unanimous decision. His two-fight winning streak with the promotion was stopped by Petpanomrung Kiatmuu9 at Glory 49: Rotterdam on December 9, 2017, who beat him by a third-round knockout.

Zouggary faced Aleksei Ulianov at Glory 59: Amsterdam on September 29, 2018. He lost the fight by unanimous decision. After suffering his second promotional loss, Zouggary was booked to face Abdellah Ezbiri at Glory 70: Lyon on October 26, 2019. He won the fight by a first-round knockout. Zouggary faced Asa Ten Pow at Glory Collision 2 on December 21, 2019. He won the fight by unanimous decision.

Zouggary wax expected to face the former RISE Lightweight champion Kento Haraguchi at Rise World Series / Shootboxing-Kings on December 25, 2022. On November 24, it was announced that Zouggary had withdrawn from the fight with an undisclosed injury and would be replaced by the former Glory Featherweight champion Serhiy Adamchuk.

Zouggary faced the one-time RISE Lightweight champion Taiju Shiratori at RISE WORLD SERIES 2023 Final Round on December 16, 2023. He lost the fight by a third-round knockout.

== Titles and accomplishments ==
- Shootboxing
  - 2014 S-Cup -65 kg World Tournament Runner-up
  - 2016 S-Cup -65 kg World Tournament Winner

== Fight record ==
Professional Kickboxing Record
33 Wins (16 (T)KO's), 7 Losses, 1 Draw
| Date | Result | Opponent | Event | Location | Method | Round | Time |
| 2023-12-16 | Loss | (Japan) Taiju Shiratori | RISE World Series 2023 - Final Round | Tokyo, Japan | KO (Knee to the head) | 3 | 1:27 |
| 2019-12-21 | Win | (United States) Asa Ten Pow | Glory Collision 2 | Arnhem, Netherlands | Decision (Unanimous) | 3 | 3:00 |
| 2019-10-26 | Win | (France) Abdellah Ezbiri | Glory 70: Lyon | Lyon, France | KO (Punches) | 1 | 2:25 |
| 2018-09-29 | Loss | (Russia) Aleksei Ulianov | Glory 59: Amsterdam | Amsterdam, Netherlands | Decision (Unanimous) | 3 | 3:00 |
| 2018-03-31 | Win | (United Kingdom) Bailey Sugden | Glory 52: Los Angeles | Los Angeles, United States | Decision (Unanimous) | 3 | 3:00 |
| 2017-12-09 | Loss | (Thailand) Petpanomrung Kiatmuu9 | Glory 49: Rotterdam | Rotterdam, Netherlands | KO (Head Kick) | 3 | 2:10 |
| 2017-09-30 | Win | (Netherlands) Massaro Glunder | Glory 45: Amsterdam | Amsterdam, Netherlands | Decision (Unanimous) | 3 | 3:00 |
| 2017-05-20 | Win | (Turkey) Yetkin Özkul | Glory 41: Holland | Netherlands | Decision (Unanimous) | 3 | 3:00 |
| 2017-04-08 | Win | (Japan) Kaito | SHOOT BOXING 2017 act.2 | Tokyo, Japan | Decision (Majority) | 5 | 3:00 |
| 2017-02-18 | Loss | (Morocco) Ilias Bulaid | Enfusion Live 46 | Eindhoven, Netherlands | Decision | 5 | 3:00 |
For the Enfusion -67 kg Championship.
| 2016-11-11 | Win | (Japan) MASAYA | SHOOT BOXING World Tournament S-cup 2016, Final | Tokyo, Japan | TKO (3 Knockdowns) | 2 | 1:14 |
Wins the 2016 S-Cup World Tournament title.
| 2016-11-11 | Win | (Thailand) Tapruwan Hadesworkout | SHOOT BOXING World Tournament S-cup 2016, Semi Final | Tokyo, Japan | Decision (Unanimous) | 3 | 3:00 |
| 2016-11-11 | Win | (Japan) Hiroto Yamaguchi | SHOOT BOXING World Tournament S-cup 2016, Quarter Final | Tokyo, Japan | TKO (2 Knockdowns) | 1 | 1:27 |
| 2016-09-19 | Win | (Japan) UMA | SHOOT BOXING 2016 act.4 | Tokyo, Japan | TKO (Corner stoppage) | 2 | 2:52 |
| 2016-08-04 | Win | (China) Wang Zhiwei | Wu Lin Feng 2016: WFL x Fight League - China vs Morocco | Tangier, Morocco | TKO (Corner Stoppage) | 3 | |
| 2016-03-12 | Win | (Japan) Yosuke Mizuochi | NO KICK NO LIFE 2016 | Tokyo, Japan | TKO | 5 | 2:28 |
| 2016-01-31 | Loss | (Japan) Koji Yoshimoto | RISE 109 | Tokyo, Japan | TKO (Knee to the body) | 3 | 1:58 |
| 2015-12-01 | Win | (Japan) Hiroaki Suzuki | 30th ANNIVERSARY “GROUND ZERO TOKYO 2015” | Tokyo, Japan | Decision (Unanimous) | 3 | 3:00 |
| 2015-06-21 | Win | (Thailand) Chuchai Hadesworkout | SHOOT BOXING 2015～SB30th Anniversary～ act.3 | Tokyo, Japan | Decision (Unanimous) | 3 | 3:00 |
| 2015-05-31 | Win | (Japan) Yuki | RISE 105 | Tokyo, Japan | TKO (Flying Knee) | 2 | 2:04 |
| 2015-02-21 | Win | (Japan) Hiroki Shishido | SHOOT BOXING 2015～SB30th Anniversary～ act.1 | Tokyo, Japan | Decision (Unanimous) | 3 | 3:00 |
| 2014-11-30 | Loss | (Japan) Hiroaki Suzuki | SHOOT BOXING World Tournament S-cup 2014, Final | Tokyo, Japan | 2nd Ext.R TKO (Punches) | 5 | 2:00 |
For the 2014 S-Cup World Tournament title.
| 2014-11-30 | Win | (France) Houcine Bennoui | SHOOT BOXING World Tournament S-cup 2014, Semi Final | Tokyo, Japan | KO (Right Hook) | 2 | 2:54 |
| 2014-11-30 | Win | (Thailand) Bovy Sor Udomson | SHOOT BOXING World Tournament S-cup 2014, Quarter Final | Tokyo, Japan | TKO (Doctor Stoppage) | 2 | 0:20 |
| 2014-04-13 | Loss | (Japan) Hiroaki Suzuki | SHOOT BOXING in TOYOKAWA UNCHAIN.1 | Aichi, Japan | Decision (Majority) | 3 | 3:00 |
| 2014-02-23 | Win | (Azerbaijan) Amil Sahmarazade | K-1 World MAX 2014 World Championship Tournament Final 4 | Baku, Azerbaijan | TKO | 2 | |
| 2013-12-14 | Win | (Moldova) Reniță Stanislav | KOK WORLD SERIES 2013 "Eagles" | Chișinău, Moldova | Decision | 3 | 3:00 |
| 2013-10-12 | Win | (Netherlands) David Dorn | Oosterbaan Gym vs. De Rest IV | Rotterdam, Netherlands | Decision | 3 | 3:00 |
| 2013-09-07 | Win | (Netherlands) Noah Apituley | Dangerzone | Lelystad, Netherlands | TKO (Punches) | 3 | |
| 2013- | Win | (Germany) Sergej Volkov | | Germany | TKO (Corner stoppage/Punches) | 3 | |
Legend: Win Loss Draw/No contest Notes

== See also ==
- List of male kickboxers
