= Aleksei Ulianov =

Russian kickboxer

- Born: Алексей Ульянов; September 23, 1988 (age 38); Russia
- Other names: Alexei Ulyanov
- Nationality: Russian
- Height: 1.76 m (5 ft 9 1/2 in)
- Weight: 70 kg (154 lb; 11 st)
- Reach: 71.5 in (182 cm)
- Style: Muay Thai, Kickboxing
- Stance: Orthodox
- Team: Kuzbass Muay Thai
- Years active: 2013 - present

Kickboxing record
- Total: 54
- Wins: 40
- By knockout: 8
- Losses: 13
- By knockout: 2
- Draws: 1
- Last updated on: February 5, 2022

Aleksei Viktorovich Ulianov (Russian: Алексей Викторович Ульянов; born September 23, 1988) is a Russian kickboxer who competes in the Glory Featherweight division. He is a two time Tatneft Cup 70 kg tournament winner.

As of 8 February 2022, Combat Press ranks him as the #7 featherweight kickboxer in the world.

== Kickboxing career ==
Ulianov made his professional debut against Saksurin Cafefarsai at Nord Desant Fight Fest, with the fight ending in a draw.

He afterwards entered the 2014 Tatneft Cup 70 kg tournament. In the first round, he knocked out Antero Hynynen, and beat Karol Lada and Itay Gershon by decision in the quarterfinal and semifinal respectively. Ulianov faced Rosario Presti in the finals. He won the fight by decision.

He entered the 2016 edition of the tournament as well, and beat Ilya Sokolov in the semifinals by decision to earn a spot in the finals, where he faced Maksim Smirnov. Ulianov defeated Smirnov by decision.

Ulianov faced former Interim Colosseum Tournament Featherweight Champion Vlad Trif on February 5, 2022, at Muaythai Factory. He won the fight controversially via split decision. Combat Press claimed that multiple experts scored the fight in favor of Trif.

On July 27, 2024, Ulianov faced Luo Chao at Wu Lin Feng 546. He lost the fight by unanimous decision.

== Titles and achievements ==
=== Amateur ===
- Russian Muay Thai Federation
  - 9x Russia Muay Thai Champion (2007, 2008, 2012, 2013, 2015, 2016, 2018, 2019, 2021)
  - 5x Russian Cup Winner (2007, 2009, 2011, 2012, 2013)
- International Federation of Muaythai Associations
  - 2008 IFMA European Championship -63.5 kg (silver)
  - 2009 IFMA European Championship -63.5 kg (bronze)
  - 2012 IFMA European Championship -67 kg (bronze)
  - 2016 IFMA World Cup in Kazan -67 kg (silver)

=== Professional ===
- Tatneft Cup
  - 2014 Tatneft Cup -70 kg Champion
  - 2016 Tatneft Cup -70 kg Champion
- RCC Fair Fight
  - 2023 interim Fair Fight Lightweight (-71 kg) Champion

== Fight record ==
Kickboxing Record
40 Wins (8 (T)KO's), 13 Losses, 1 Draw
Date	Result	Opponent	Event	Location	Method	Round	Time
2026-09-26	Win	(Turkey) Murat Akçi	Loca Fight Club - 75 kg 8-man Tournament, reserve	Istanbul, Turkey	Decision (unanimous)	3	3:00
2025-12-27	Loss	(Thailand) Rittewada Petchyindee Academy	Rajadamnern World Series	Bangkok, Thailand	TKO (Doctor stoppage)	3	1:15
2025-08-16	Loss	(Russia) Vladimir Tulaev	RCC Fair Fight 32	Yekaterinburg, Russia	Decision (Unanimous)	3	3:00
2025-04-12	Win	(Iran) Masoud Minaei	RCC Fair Fight 30	Yekaterinburg, Russia	Ext.R Decision (Unanimous)	4	3:00
2024-10-26	Loss	(China) Ouyang Feng	Wu Lin Feng 549 - MAX Qualifier Tournament, Final	Tangshan, China	Decision (Unanimous)	3	3:00
2024-10-26	Win	(China) Ji Longteng	Wu Lin Feng 549 - MAX Qualifier Tournament, Semifinals	Tangshan, China	Decision (Unanimous)	3	3:00
2024-07-27	Loss	(China) Luo Chao	Wu Lin Feng 546	China	Decision (Unanimous)	3	3:00
2024-02-03	Win	(Russia) Jamal Yusupov	RCC Fair Fight 26	Yekaterinburg, Russia	Decision (Unanimous)	5	3:00
Wins the RCC Fair Fight -70kg title.
2023-09-23	Win	(Armenia) Zhora Akopyan	RCC Intro 28	Yekaterinburg, Russia	Decision (Unanimous)	5	3:00
Wins the interim RCC Fair Fight -70kg title.
2023-06-11	Win	(Russia) Ovanes Nagabedyan	Open Fighting Championship 31	Sheregesh, Russia	Decision (Unanimous)	3	3:00
2023-02-18	Win	(Russia) Alexander Skvortsov	RCC Fair Fight 20, Tournament Semifinals	Yekaterinburg, Russia	Decision (Unanimous)	3	3:00
2022-12-10	Win	(Belarus) Denis Varaksa	ASI Championship Power of Siberia 6	Kemerovo, Russia	TKO (retirement)	2	3:00
2022-11-26	Loss	(Russia) Mamuka Usubyan	RCC Fair Fight 19	Yekaterinburg, Russia	Decision (Split)	5	3:00
For the Fair Fight lightweight (-71 kg) title.
2022-02-05	Win	(Romania) Vlad Trif	Muaythai Factory	Kemerovo, Russia	Decision (Split)	3	3:00
2021-10-23	Win	(Ukraine) Serhiy Adamchuk	Glory Collision 3	Arnhem, Netherlands	Decision (Split)	3	3:00
2021-08-28	Win	(Belarus) Vadim Vaskov	Fair Fight XV	Yekaterinburg, Russia	Decision (Unanimous)	3	3:00
2019-12-21	Loss	(Ukraine) Serhiy Adamchuk	Glory Collision 2	Arnhem, Netherlands	Decision (Split)	3	3:00
2019-06-22	Win	(Japan) Masaya Kubo	Glory 66: Paris	Paris, France	Decision (Uannimous)	3	3:00
2019-03-09	Win	(Netherlands) Massaro Glunder	Glory 64: Strasbourg	Strasbourg, France	Decision (Unanimous)	3	3:00
2018-12-22	Loss	(Thailand) Pakorn PKSaenchaimuaythaigym	Muaythai Factory	Russia	Decision (Unanimous)	5	3:00
For the WMC World -65kg title.
2018-11-03	Win	(China) Wang Pengfei	Wu Lin Feng 2018: WLF -67kg World Cup 2018-2019 5th Round	China	Decision	3	3:00
2018-09-29	Win	(Netherlands) Zakaria Zouggary	Glory 59: Amsterdam	Amsterdam, Netherlands	Decision (Unanimous)	3	3:00
2018-09-01	Win	(Thailand) Jomthong Chuwattana	Wu Lin Feng 2018: WLF -67kg World Cup 2018-2019 3rd Round	Zhengzhou, China	Decision	3	3:00
2018-07-07	Win	(China) Liu Yong	Wu Lin Feng 2018: WLF -67kg World Cup 2018-2019 1st Round	Zhengzhou, China	Decision	3	3:00
2018-06-02	NC	(United Kingdom) Bailey Sugden	Glory 54: Birmingham	Birmingham, United Kingdom	Doctor stoppage (head clash)	2	
2017-12-23	Loss	(China) Qiu Jianliang	Glory of Heroes: Jinan - GOH 65 kg Championship Tournament, Semi-Finals	Jinan, China	Decision (Unanimous)	3	3:00
2017-07-14	Loss	(Georgia (country)) Giga Chikadze	Glory 43: New York	New York, United States	Decision (Split)	3	3:00
2017-03-25	Loss	(Thailand) Petpanomrung Kiatmuu9	Glory 39: Brussels - Featherweight Contender Tournament, Semi Finals	Brussels, Belgium	Decision (Unanimous)	3	3:00
2016-12-23	Win	(China) Jia Aoqi	Wu Fight	China	Decision	3	3:00
2016-11-11	Win	(Russia) Maksim Smirnov	Tatneft Cup, -70 kg Tournament Final	Kazan, Russia	Ext.R Decision	4	3:00
Wins the 2016 Tatneft Cup -70kg title.
2016-09-22	Win	(Russia) Ilya Sokolov	Tatneft Cup, -70 kg Tournament Semi Final	Kazan, Russia	Ext.R Decision	4	3:00
2016-08-11	Loss	(Russia) Said Magomedov	Tatneft Cup	Kazan, Russia	Ext.R Decision	4	3:00
2016-03-06	Win	(Kyrgyzstan) Dastan Sharsheev	Tatneft Cup	Kazan, Russia	Decision	3	3:00
2015-12-19	Loss	(Denmark) Youssef Assouik	Muay Thai Moscow	Samara, Russia	TKO (Doctor stoppage/cut)	1	2:10
2015-10-03	Loss	(Thailand) Pakorn PKSaenchaimuaythaigym	Xtreme Muay Thai 2015	Macao	Decision	5	3:00
2014-09-13	Win	(Italy) Rosario Presti	Tatneft Cup, Final	Kazan, Russia	Ext.R Decision	4	3:00
Wins the 2014 Tatneft Cup -70kg title.
2014-07-18	Win	(Israel) Itay Gershon	Tatneft Cup, Semi Final	Kazan, Russia	Ext.R Decision	4	3:00
2014-04-16	Win	(Poland) Karol Lada	Tatneft Cup, Quarter Final	Kazan, Russia	Decision	3	3:00
2014-03-19	Win	(Finland) Antero Hynynen	Tatneft Cup	Kazan, Russia	KO (Right High Kick)	2	
2013-05-11	Draw	(Thailand) Saksurin Cafefarsai	Nord Desant Fight Fest	Khanty-Mansiysk, Russia	Decision	5	3:00
2012-12-08	Loss	(Ukraine) Sergey Kulyaba	Commonwealth Cup Team Russia VS Team CIS	Novossibirsk, Russia	Decision	3	3:00
2011-09-08	Win	(Thailand) Chalermdet Sor.Tawanrung	Elite Fight Night Russia	Tyumen, Russia	Decision	5	3:00
2011-	Win	(Russia) Ruslan Berdyev		Russia	KO (High kick)	1	
Legend: Win Loss Draw/No contest Notes

Amateur Muay Thai Record
Date	Result	Opponent	Event	Location	Method	Round	Time
2016-11-26	Loss	(Ukraine) Sergey Kulyaba	IFMA World Cup 2016 in Kazan, Final	Kazan, Russia	Decision	3	3:00
Wins 2016 IFMA World Cup in Kazan -67kg Silver Medal.
2016-11-23	Loss	(Kazakhstan) Nikolay Samussev	IFMA World Cup 2016 in Kazan, Semi Finals	Kazan, Russia	Decision	3	3:00
2013-10-20	Loss		SportAccord World Combat Games	Saint-Petersburg, Russia	Decision	3	3:00
2012-09-09	Loss	(Belarus) Andrei Kulebin	2012 IFMA World Championships 2012, Quarter Finals	Saint Petersburg, Russia	Decision	4	2:00
2012-05-	Loss	(Ukraine) Sergey Kulyaba	2012 IFMA European Championship, Semi Finals	Antalya, Turkey	Doctor stoppage	1	
Wins 2012 IFMA European Championship -67kg Bronze Medal.
2011-04-27	Loss	(Belarus) Andrei Kulebin	I.F.M.A. European Muaythai Championships '11, Quarter Finals -67 kg	Antalya, Turkey	TKO (Ref Stop)	3	
Legend: Win Loss Draw/No contest Notes
