= Anvar Boynazarov =

Uzbek Muay Thai kickboxer

- Born: January 10, 1989 (age 37); Tashkent, Uzbekistan
- Other names: "The Uzbek"
- Nationality: Uzbekistan
- Height: 1.75 m (5 ft 9 in)
- Weight: 65.0 kg (143.3 lb; 10.24 st)
- Division: Featherweight
- Style: Muay Thai
- Stance: Orthodox
- Fighting out of: Phuket, Thailand
- Team: Tiger Muay Thai
- Years active: 15

Kickboxing record
- Total: 125
- Wins: 95
- By knockout: 53
- Losses: 28
- Draws: 2

Mixed martial arts record
- Total: 12
- Wins: 6
- By knockout: 5
- By decision: 1
- Losses: 6
- By knockout: 1
- By submission: 5

Other information
- Notable relatives: Firdavs Boynazarov (Brother)
- Boxing record from BoxRec
- Mixed martial arts record from Sherdog

Anvar Boynazarov (born January 10, 1989) is an Uzbek Muay Thai kickboxer and mixed martial artist. He has previously competed in kickboxing for the Glory promotion, and holds notable victories over Giga Chikadze, Fabio Pinca and Abdellah Ezbiri. In mixed martial arts, Boynazarov has most recently competed for the Legacy Fighting Alliance.

== Kickboxing career ==
Anvar Boynazarov was born in Samarqand, Uzbekistan on January 10, 1989. During his youth, Boynazarov began his fighting career by training in Muay Thai with his brother Firdavs. The most notable highlight of his career came when he upset Fabio Pinca during the tournament semi finals at Glory 47: Lyon. Despite being seen as a heavy underdog in the fight he managed to knock out Pinca with a heavy left hook during the second round which earned him the KO of the Night award and the comeback-of-the-year award by Combatpress.com. Following this upset, Boynazarov advanced to the finals where he met Abdellah Ezbiri. Ezbiri won the fight by a decision.

Following this, Anvar fought for the Glory interim Featherweight title against Kevin VanNostrand. VanNostrand won the fight by a first round KO.

After these two losses he fought in China during EM Legend 27, where he faced Thodkhui MR.Manas. Thodkhui won the fight by a split decision.

He then fought in the EM Legend Featherweight Tournament. He won a unanimous decision against Pan Jiayun to earn a place in the tournament finals. He won the final bout against Meng Guodong with a third round body shot KO.

During Glory 67 Anvar fought the incumbent Glory Featherweight champion Petpanomrung Kiatmuu9. Petpanomrung won the fight by a unanimous decision.

Boynazarov faced the former RISE lightweight champion Kento Haraguchi at RISE World Series 2023 Osaka on July 2, 2023.

== Mixed martial arts career ==
Boynazarov made his mixed martial arts debut against Henry Crapp at Combat Night Pro 19 on December 12, 2020. He won the fight by a first-round knockout. Boynazarov followed this up with another first-rounds stoppage victory, as he knocked Rob Fuller out in 99 seconds at Combat Night Pro 20 on March 13, 2021.

Boynazarov faced John Pham at LFA 121 on January 14, 2022. He won the fight by a first-round stoppage, needing just 21 seconds to knock Pham out.

Boynazarov faced Erik Silva on August 9, 2022 at Dana White's Contender Series 49. He lost the fight via ground and pound TKO stoppage early in the first round.

Boynazarov faced Marlon Gonzalez at Gamebred Bareknuckle MMA 7 on March 2, 2024 and won in the first round by knockout.

Boynazarov faced Jackson Santa Cruz on August 30, 2024 at United Fight League 5, losing the bout via rear-naked choke in the first round.

== Championships and awards ==
Kickboxing

- EM Legend
  - 2018 EM Legend Featherweight Tournament Championship -65 kg
  - 2017 EM Legend 18 Featherweight Tournament Championship -65 kg
  - 2016 EM Legend 10 Featherweight Tournament Championship -65 kg
- Glory
  - Glory 47: Lyon KO of the Night
  - Glory 47: Lyon Featherweight Contender Tournament runner-Up

Muay Thai

- World Muay Thai Federation
  - 2013 WMF Featherweight World Championship -65 kg
  - 2010 WMF Featherweight World Championship -65 kg

Accomplishments

- 2017 Combat Press Kickboxing Awards: Comeback of the Year

== Mixed martial arts record ==
Professional record breakdown
12 matches	6 wins	6 losses
By knockout	5	1
By submission	0	5
By decision	1	0

Res.	Record	Opponent	Method	Event	Date	Round	Time	Location	Notes
Loss	6–6	Lorram Esteves	Submission (face crank)	Fury FC 115	February 6, 2026	1	2:59	San Antonio, Texas, United States	
Loss	6–5	Cameron Graves	Submission (face crank)	Fury FC 112	December 14, 2025	1	2:24	Houston, Texas, United States	
Loss	6–4	Jackson Santa Cruz	Submission (rear-naked choke)	United Fight League 5	August 30, 2024	1	2:17	Chandler, Arizona, United States	Bantamweight bout.
Win	6–3	Marlon Gonzales	KO (flying knee and punches)	Gamebred Bareknuckle MMA 7	March 2, 2024	1	0:16	Orlando, Florida, United States	Return to Featherweight. Bare knuckle MMA.
Loss	5–3	Rentsen Otgontulga	Submission (face crank)	Tuff-N-Uff 134	November 12, 2023	1	1:11	Las Vegas, Nevada, United States	Catchweight (140 lb) bout.
Win	5–2	Quran Walker	Decision (unanimous)	Crown FC 11	September 30, 2023	3	5:00	Hurricane, Utah, United States	Lightweight debut.
Loss	4–2	Kale Moniz	Submission (face crank)	Tuff-N-Uff 133	September 15, 2023	1	2:12	Las Vegas, Nevada, United States	Bantamweight debut.
Win	4–1	Matthew Knauss	TKO (punches)	Combat Night: Orlando	March 4, 2023	2	1:43	Orlando, Florida, United States	
Loss	3–1	Erik Silva	TKO (elbows and punches)	Dana White's Contender Series 49	August 9, 2022	1	1:32	Las Vegas, Nevada, United States	
Win	3–0	John Pham	KO (knee and punches)	LFA 121	January 14, 2022	1	0:21	Dallas, Texas, United States	
Win	2–0	Rob Fuller	KO (knee and punches)	Combat Night Pro 20	March 13, 2021	1	1:39	Orlando, Florida, United States	Catchweight (140 lb) bout.
Win	1–0	Henry Crapp	TKO (punches)	Combat Night Pro 19	December 12, 2020	1	1:10	Tallahassee, Florida, United States	Featherweight debut.

== Karate combat record ==
Professional record breakdown
3 matches	1 win	2 losses
By knockout	1	2

Res.	Record	Opponent	Method	Event	Date	Round	Time	Location	Notes
Loss	1–2	Marlon Gonzales	TKO (punches)	Karate Combat 56	July 19, 2025	1	2:53	Miami, Florida, United States	
Loss	1–1	Luis Guerrero	TKO (punches)	Karate Combat 53	February 28, 2025	1	0:13	Denver, Colorado, United States	
Win	1–0	Ignacio Capllonch	TKO (punches)	Karate Combat 52	January 24, 2025	1	1:22	Miami, Florida, United States	

== Kickboxing & Muay Thai record ==
Professional Muaythai record
95 wins (53 (T)KOs), 28 losses, 2 draws
Date	Result	Opponent	Event	Location	Method	Round	Time
2023-07-02	Loss	(Japan) Kento Haraguchi	RISE World Series 2023 - 1st Round	Osaka, Japan	KO (body kick)	1	1:30
2019-07-05	Loss	(Thailand) Petpanomrung Kiatmuu9	Glory 67: Orlando	Orlando, United States	Decision (unanimous)	5	3:00
For the Glory Featherweight Championship.
2019-03-09	Win	(France) Abdellah Ezbiri	Glory 64: Strasbourg	Strasbourg, France	Decision (unanimous)	3	3:00
2018-09-14	Win	(England) Bailey Sugden	Glory 58:Chicago	Chicago, USA	Decision (split)	3	3:00
2018-08-10	Loss	(Ukraine) Serhiy Adamchuk	Glory 56: Denver	Colorado	Decision (unanimous)	3	3:00
2018-04-21	Win	(China) Meng Guodong	EM Legend Featherweight Tournament Final	Leshan, China	KO (left hook to the body)	3	3:00
Wins the EM Legend Featherweight -65kg Tournament Championship.
2018-04-21	Win	(China) Pan Jiayun	EM Legend Featherweight Tournament Semi Final	Leshan, China	Decision (unanimous)	3	3:00
2018-01-20	Loss	(Thailand) Thodkhui MR.Manas	EM Legend 27	Kunming, China	Decision (split)	3	3:00
2017-12-01	Loss	(United States) Kevin VanNostrand	Glory 48: New York	New York, United States	KO (knee to the body)	1	1:06
For the Glory Interim Featherweight Championship.
2017-10-28	Loss	(France) Abdellah Ezbiri	Glory 47: Lyon Featherweight Contender Tournament Finals	Lyon, France	Decision	3	3:00
For the Glory Featherweight Contender Tournament Final.
2017-10-28	Win	(France) Fabio Pinca	Glory 47: Lyon Semi Finals	Lyon, France	KO (left hook)	2	1:52
Glory Featherweight Contender Tournament, Semi Finals.
2017-08-05	Win	(Thailand) Narong	Topking World Series	Su-ngai Kolok, Thailand	Decision (unanimous)	5	
2017-07-09	Win	(Brazil) Marlon Dos Santos	Topking World Series	Chongqing, China	TKO	1	
2017-05-27	Win	(Thailand) Thodkhui MR.Manas	EM Legend 19	Chengdu, China	Decision (unanimous)	3	3:00
2017-04-28	Win	(Ukraine) Igor Liubchenko	EM Legend 18 Tournament Final	Chengdu, China	TKO (referee stoppage)	2	
Wins the EM Legend 18 Featherweight -65kg Tournament Championship.
2017-04-28	Win	(United Kingdom) Mo Abdurahman	EM Legend 18 Tournament Semi Finals	Chengdu, China	Decision (unanimous)	3	3:00
2016-12-10	Loss	(France) Morgan Adrar	Phoenix Fighting Championship	Keserwan, Lebanon	Decision (unanimous)	5	3:00
2016-11-19	Loss	(Brazil) Julio Lobo	Thai Fight Airrace 1	Ban Chang, Thailand	Decision (unanimous)	5	3:00
2016-09-23	Win	(New Zealand) Quade Taranaki	EM Legend 12	Leshan, China	KO	2	
2016-08-20	Loss	(Thailand) Saenchai	Thai Fight Phra Chom Klao Ladkrabang	Bangkok, Thailand	Decision (unanimous)	5	3:00
2016-07-09	Win	(Thailand) Kunchai	EM Legend 10 Tournament Final	Nanchong, China	Decision (unanimous)	3	3:00
Wins the EM Legend 10 Featherweight -65kg Tournament Championship.
2016-07-09	Win	(Georgia (country)) Levan Shaishmelashvili	EM Legend 10 Tournament Semi Final	Nanchong, China	KO	1	
2016-06-05	Win	(Brazil) Maykol Yurk	EM Legend 9	Chengdu, China	Decision (unanimous)	3	3:00
2015-08-07	Win	(Thailand) Coke Chunhawat	Lion Fight 27	Temecula, United States	Decision (unanimous)	5	3:00
2015-09-19	Loss	(Ukraine) Serhiy Adamchuk	Dynamite	San Jose, United States	Decision (unanimous)	3	3:00
2015-08-07	Win	(Georgia (country)) Giga Chikadze	Glory 23: Las Vegas	Las Vegas, Nevada, US	Decision (split)	3	3:00
2015-04-04	Win	(Thailand) Ngokun Saiyok Muaythaigym	Thai Fight	Nakhon Nayok, Thailand	TKO (right flying knee)	2	
2015-01-04	Win	(Thailand) Sakultong Sltpantong	Sunday Championship Night	Phuket, Thailand	TKO (punches)	4	
2014-12-23	Win	(Thailand) Lampet Sitsongpeenong	Tuesday Championship Night	Phuket, Thailand	TKO (right hook)	2	
2014-12-14	Win	(Thailand) Mongkol Kor Kumpanart	Max Muay Thai	Thailand	Decision (unanimous)	5	3:00
2014-11-19	Loss	(Thailand) Ninwisset Sumalee	Wednesday Championship Night	Phuket, Thailand	Decision (unanimous)	5	3:00
2014-08-13	Loss	(United Kingdom) Craig Dickson	Wednesday Championship Night	Phuket, Thailand	KO (right elbow)	3	
2014-05-30	Loss	(Brazil) Jose Neto	Toyota Marathon	Surat Thani, Thailand	Decision (unanimous)	5	3:00
2014-04-15	Loss	(Thailand) Tukkataong Phetpaytai	Andaman League	Thailand	TKO (leg kick)	1	
2013-10-26	Win	(Thailand) Petkwanjai Sit Or	Lumpinee Stadium	Bangkok, Thailand	KO (left hook)	5	
2013-08-28	Win	(France) Florian Breau	Wednesday Championship Night	Phuket, Thailand	Decision (unanimous)	5	
2013-06-28	Loss	(Thailand) Seeoui Sor Sunantachai	Muay Thai Warriors	Chiang Mai, Thailand	KO (elbows)	2	
2013-05-31	Loss	(Iran) Vahid Shahbazi	Toyota Marathon	Kanchanaburi, Thailand	KO		
2013-05-31	Win	(Italy) Mathias Gallo Cassarino	Toyota Marathon	Kanchanaburi, Thailand	Decision (unanimous)	5	3:00
2013-04-28	Loss	(France) Rafi Bohic	9th Anniversary Bangla Boxing Stadium	Phuket, Thailand	TKO (referee stoppage)	3	
For the WMC World Title -66.7 kg.
2013-03-23	Win	(Ukraine) Maxim Federkov	WMF World Championship Tournament Final	Bangkok, Thailand			
Wins the WMF World Championship -63.5 kg.
2013-03-23	Win	(France) Hafed Romdhane	WMF World Championship Tournament Semi Finals	Bangkok, Thailand	Decision (unanimous)	5	3:00
2013-01-06	Win	(Thailand) Munggronpet Dragon Muaythai Gym	Sunday Championship Night	Phuket, Thailand	KO (left hook)	1	
2012-12-15	Loss	(Thailand) Panfar Tor Chantraroj	Muaythai World Fighter Spirit	Bangkok, Thailand	Decision (unanimous)	5	3:00
2012-11-14	Loss	(France) Rafi Bohic	Bangla Boxing Stadium	Phuket, Thailand	KO	2	
2012-11-01	Win	(Thailand) RIT Tiger Muaythai	Bangla Boxing Stadium	Phuket, Thailand	KO (right cross)	2	
2012-10-17	Loss	(Thailand) Chalamkaw	Bangla Boxing Stadium	Phuket, Thailand	Decision (unanimous)	5	3:00
2012-09-25	Win	(Republic of Ireland) Stephen Meleady	Petchyindee Fight Lumpinee Stadium	Bangkok, Thailand	Decision (unanimous)	5	3:00
2012-08-29	Loss	(Thailand) Deachkalon Sumalee Boxing Gym	Wednesday Championship Night	Phuket, Thailand	Decision (unanimous)	5	3:00
Legend: Win Loss Draw/no contest Notes

== Kun Khmer record ==
Professional Kun Khmer record
0 wins, 1 loss, 0 draws
Date	Result	Opponent	Event	Location	Method	Round	Time
2012-01-15	Loss	(Cambodia) Keo Rumchong	Khmer Fight	Phnom Penh, Cambodia	TKO (injury)	1	
Legend: Win Loss Draw/no contest Notes

== See also ==
- List of male kickboxers
