= Mo Abdurahman =

British Muay Thai fighter (born 1995)

- Born: 25 November 1995 (age 30); Cape Town, South Africa
- Nickname: Mighty
- Height: 180 cm (5 ft 11 in)
- Division: Welterweight
- Style: Muay Thai
- Stance: Orthodox
- Fighting out of: Southampton, England
- Team: Exile Gym Lookborai

Kickboxing record
- Total: 64
- Wins: 48
- By knockout: 18
- Losses: 16
- By knockout: 9
- Draws: 0

Mo Abdurahman (born 25 November 1995) is a British Muay Thai fighter and kickboxer. He is the reingning ISKA Muay Thai World Light-Welterweight champion.

As of September 2026 he was the #1 ranked -67 kg kickboxer in the world according to Combat Press.

== Biography and career ==
Abdurahman started training in Muay Thai at the age of 14 and had his first fight a year later.

On March 11, 2017, Abdurahman entered the 2017 Road to Glory UK Tournament. He defeated Matthew Gordon by second-round technical knockout. In the semi-final he defeated Joe Himsworth by second-round knockout. In the final he defeated Bailey Sugden by unanimous decision.

On July 14, 2017, Abdurahman replaced the injured Matt Embree on Glory 43: New York for a Featherweight 4-man Contender Tournament. In the semifinals he lost to Kevin VanNostrand by second-round technical knockout.

On 29 April 2018, Abdurahman stopped Manachai's 10 fight winning streak at YOKKAO Next Generation Southampton with a third-round knockout with a right hook.

On November 3, 2018, Abdurahman entered the 2018 K-1 Super Lightweight Grand Prix. He was defeated by Yasuomi Soda in the quarterfinals via extension round knockout.

On May 23, 2021, Abdurahman faced Jack Kennedy at the Victory 7 event. He won the fight by majority decision.

On 24 July 2021 Carillo faced Mo Abduraham at Combat Fight Series 5 for the ISKA Muay Thai Intercontinental 65 kg title. Carrillo won the fight by technical knockout in the fourth round.

On August 22, 2021, Abdurahman faced Craig Coakley at Lion Fight 68 for the Lion Fight European Super Lightweight title. He won the fight by split decision.

On September 3, 2023, Abdurahman faced Jin Hirayaman at Nariagari vol.2 in Osaka, Japan. He won the fight by third round technical knockout and captured the vacant ISKA K-1 Intercontinental Welterweight title.

Abdurahman travelled to Osaka, Japan, to face Taimu Hisai at Knock Out.67 on August 8, 2026. He lost the fight by second round knockout.

== Titles and achievements ==
=== Muay Thai ===
- International Sport Kickboxing Association
  - 2021 ISKA K-1 Intercontinental Welterweight (-67 kg) Champion
  - 2025 ISKA Muay Thai World Light-Welterweight (-65 kg) Champion
- Muay Thai Grand Prix
  - 2025 MTGP World Welterweight (-66 kg) Champion
- World Muaythai Organization
  - 2024 WMO European Welterweight Champion
- Lion Fight
  - 2021 Lion Fight European Super Lightweight Champion
- International Professional Combat Council
  - 2026 IPCC Kun Khmer World -67 kg Champion

=== Kickboxing ===
- International Sport Kickboxing Association
  - 2019 ISKA Oriental rules World Light-Welterweight (-65 kg) Champion
- 8IGHT Strikes
  - 2026 8IGHT Kickboxing Featherweight Champion
- T7 Fight Promotions
  - 2026 T7 K-1 World 67 kg Champion
- Glory
  - 2017 Road to Glory UK 65 kg Tournament winner
- World Kickboxing Association
  - 2016 WKA K-1 British 63 kg Champion

== Fight record ==
Professional Muay Thai and Kickboxing record
48 Wins (18 (T)KOs), 16 Losses, 0 Draw
Date	Result	Opponent	Event	Location	Method	Round	Time
2026-09-20	Win	(Cambodia) Soth Veasna	Boostrong Kun Khmer	Cambodia	Decision (unanimous)	3	3:00
Wins the IPCC Kun Khmer World -67kg title
2026-08-08	Loss	(Japan) Taimu Hisai	KNOCK OUT.67	Osaka, Japan	KO (left cross)	2	1:01
2026-06-13	Win	(France) Ilias Krafi	8IGHT Fight Series	London, England	Decision (unanimous)	5	3:00
Wins the inaugural 8IGHT Kickboxing Featherweight title.
2026-05-02	Win	(Sweden) Emil Flystam	MTFL 18	Helsingborg, Sweden	Decision (unanimous)	5	3:00
2026-02-28	Win	(Spain) David Mejia	T7 Fight Promotions 6	Poole, England	Decision (unanimous)	5	3:00
Wins the vacant T7 K-1 World 67kg title.
2025-11-08	Win	(United Kingdom) George Mouzakitis	MTGP Fight Night 99	Sheffield, England	KO (left hook to the body)	3	1:27
Wins the vacant ISKA Muay Thai World Light-Welterweight (-65kg) title
2025-09-26	Win	(Cambodia) Eh Amarin Phouthong	Town Boxing	Phnom Penh, Cambodia	Decision	3	3:00
2025-04-05	Win	(Republic of Ireland) Dano O`Toole	MTGP Fight Night 93	London, England	Decision (unanimous)	5	3:00
Wins the MTGP World Welterweight (-66kg) title.
2024-09-28	Loss	(China) Jin Ying	Wu Lin Feng 548 - 63 kg World Tournament A Group, Semifinal	Tangshan, China	Decision (unanimous)	3	3:00
2024-07-20	Win	(Portugal) Alexandre Cruz	21CFC Kings Never Die	Woking, England	Decision (unanimous)	3	3:00
2024-06-16	Win	(Republic of Ireland) Tom Keogh	Warriors Gym presents: The Takeover	Dublin, Ireland	KO (left hook)	4	2:16
Wins the vacant WMO European Welterweight title.
2024-03-16	Win	(Spain) Pau Portillo	Combat Fight Series 17	Bournemouth, England	KO (punches)	2	2:07
2023-10-28	Loss	(United Kingdom) Nathan Bendon	MTGP Fight Night 85	London, England	Decision (split)	5	3:00
For the MTGP World Super Lightweight (-63.5kg) title
2021-08-22	Win	(Japan) Jin Hirayama	Nariagari vol.2	Osaka, Japan	TKO (referee stoppage)	3	
Wins the vacant ISKA K-1 Intercontinental Welterweight (-67kg) title
2023-07-07	Loss	(Belgium) Youssef Boughanem	Warrior Spirit	Saint-Josse-ten-Noode, Belgium	TKO	3	
For the WKN Muay Thai World Super Welterweight (72.5kg) title.
2023-04-15	Win	(Portugal) Mihail Constandoi	MTGP	London, England	TKO (knee to the body)	2	2:01
2022-02-26	Loss	(France) Jérémy Monteiro	Konateam Prestige	Villiers-sur-Marne, France	KO	4	
Loses the ISKA Oriental rules World Light-Welterweight (-65kg) title.
2021-08-22	Win	(Republic of Ireland) Craig Coakley	Lion Fight 68	Bolton, England	Decision (Split)	5	3:00
Wins the Lion Fight European Super Lightweight title
2021-07-24	Loss	(Scotland) Nico Carrillo	Combat Fight Series 5	London, England	TKO (punches and elbows)	4	1:28
For the ISKA Muay Thai Intercontinental -65kg title.
2021-05-23	Win	(United Kingdom) Jack Kennedy	Victory 7	England	Decision (majority)	5	3:00
2020-03-08	Win	(Spain) Karim Arellano	Combat Fight Series 3	London, England	KO (left hook to the body)	1	0:54
2019-12-07	Win	(France) Ryan Braillon	Victory 5	Gateshead, England	Decision (unanimous)	5	3:00
2019-10-19	Win	(Ukraine) Bohdan Kopkin	Warriors Gym presents	Cork, Ireland	TKO (punches and kick)	3	2:28
2019-08-03	Win	(France) Bertrand Lambert	Capital Punishment 10	Southampton, England	Decision (unanimous)	5	3:00
Wins the vacant ISKA Oriental rules World Light-Welterweight (-65kg) title.
2019-03-23	Win	(Republic of Ireland) Craig Coakley	YOKKAO 38	Bolton, UK	KO (spinning back elbow)	3	2:15
2018-11-03	Loss	(Japan) Yasuomi Soda	K-1 World GP 2018: Super Lightweight Championship Tournament, Quarterfinals	Saitama, Japan	KO (knee to the body)	4	2:30
2018-07-28	Loss	(Thailand) Wutthiphong	EM Legend 32	Chengdu, China	Decision (majority)	3	3:00
2018-04-29	Win	(Thailand) Manachai	YOKKAO Next Generation	Southampton, England	KO (right hook)	3	2:00
2018-03-18	Win	(China) Wang Zhendong	EM Legend 29 - Superfight Series London	London, England	TKO (knee to the head)	3	2:15
2017-11-25	Loss	(Scotland) Chris Shaw	Power of Scotland 25, Final	Paisley, Scotland	Decision	3	3:00
2017-11-25	Win	(Spain) Alexander Rivero	Power of Scotland 25, Semifinals	Paisley, Scotland	Decision	3	3:00
2017-11-25	Win	(United Kingdom) Dean James	Power of Scotland 25, Quarterfinals	Paisley, Scotland	Decision	3	3:00
2017-07-14	Loss	(United States) Kevin VanNostrand	Glory 43: New York - Featherweight Contender Tournament, Semifinals	New York City, New York	TKO (2 knockdowns)	1	1:50
2017-03-11	Win	(United Kingdom) Bailey Sugden	Road to Glory UK 65 kg Tournament, Final	Grantham, England	Decision (unanimous)	3	3:00
Wins the 2017 Road to Glory UK 65 kg Tournament.
2017-03-11	Win	(United Kingdom) Joe Himsworth	Road to Glory UK 65 kg Tournament, Semi-finals	Grantham, England	KO (punch)	2	2:00
2017-03-11	Win	(United Kingdom) Matthew Gordon	Road to Glory UK 65 kg Tournament, Quarter-finals	Grantham, England	TKO (2 knockdowns)	2	2:30
2017-04-28	Loss	(Uzbekistan) Anvar Boynazarov	EM Legend 18 Tournament Semi Finals	Chengdu, China	Decision (unanimous)	3	3:00
2017-02-11	Win	(United Kingdom) Josh Page	Roar Combat League 5	Watford, England	Decision	5	3:00
2017-02-04	Loss	(Scotland) Chris Shaw	DUEL Grand Prix, Final	Newcastle upon Tyne, England	TKO (unanimous)	3	3:00
2017-02-04	Win	(United Kingdom) Kris Pearson	DUEL Grand Prix, Semifinals	Newcastle upon Tyne, England	TKO (doctor stoppage)	1	2:11
2016-11-05	Win	(Brazil) Andre Teixeira	Honour of the Ring - 10	Denmark	KO (right cross)	2	
2016-09-18	Win	(United Kingdom) Femi Akinade	Super Fight Series II	Comanesti, England	KO (knee to the head)	3	2:20
Wins the WKA K-1 British 63 kg title.
2016-08-16	Loss	(Romania) Cristian Spetcu	SUPERKOMBAT World Grand Prix IV 2016	Comanesti, Romania	Decision (unanimous)	3	3:00
2016-02-13	Win	(United Kingdom) Josh Page	Roar Combat League 2	England	Decision (unanimous)	5	3:00
2015-12-07	Loss	(United Kingdom) Dominik Matusz	KO Blood and Glory 6	London, England	Decision (unanimous)	3	3:00
2015-05-16	Loss	(United Kingdom) Kyle Helleur	Super Fight Series	London, England	TKO (punches)	2	
2014-	Loss	(United Kingdom) James Freeman	Phoenix Fight Night Round 3	England	TKO (low kicks)	3	
Legend: Win Loss Draw/No contest Notes

== Karate Combat record ==
Res.	Record	Opponent	Method	Event	Date	Round	Time	Location	Notes
Loss	0-1	Sajad Sattari	Decision (unanimous)	Karate Combat 54	May 2, 2025	3	3:00	Dubai, United Arab Emirates	
