= Bailey Sugden =

British kickboxer (born 1997)

- Born: 10 November 1997 (age 28); England
- Other names: British Bulldog; Badboy
- Height: 172 cm (5 ft 8 in)
- Weight: 65 kg (143 lb; 10.2 st)
- Stance: Orthodox
- Fighting out of: Newark-on-Trent, England
- Team: Suggy's Gym
- Trainer: Dean Sugden
- Years active: 2015 - present

Kickboxing record
- Total: 23
- Wins: 15
- By knockout: 3
- Losses: 7
- No contests: 1

Other information
- Notable relatives: Chad Sugden (brother)

Bailey Sugden is a British kickboxer. He is the current ISKA K-1 World 63.5 kg Champion.

== Biography and career ==
Bailey Sugden started kickboxing training at the age of 4 under the teaching of his father Dean Sugden, a former WKA Kickboxing world champion.

Sugden had 22 wins, 5 losses and 1 draw as an amateur kickboxer. He turned professional on 21 March 2015, at the Future Stars League event in Harrow, England. He won a 4-man tournament, defeating Luke Portrainer by unanimous decision in the semi-final and Joe Himsworth in the final by unanimous decision.

On 11 March 2017 Sugden took part in the 2017 Road to Glory UK Tournament. He defeated Andrew Liddell by third-round technical knockout. In the semi-final he defeated Adrian Maxim by majority decision. In the final he lost to Mo Abdurahman by unanimous decision. Despite the loss he received a Glory contract.

On 14 July 2017 Sugden made his Glory promotional debut at Glory 43: New York against Arthur Sorsor. He won the fight by unanimous decision.

On 9 December 2017 Sugden was scheduled to face Zhang Chenglong at Glory 49: Rotterdam. He won the fight by unanimous decision.

Sugden faced Zakaria Zouggary at Glory 52: Los Angeles on 31 March 2018. He lost the fight by unanimous decision.

On 28 September 2019 Sugden faced Asa Ten Pow at Glory 68: Miami. He lost the fight by unanimous decision.

On 22 January 2021 it was announced that Sugden would face Václav Sivák at Oktagon Underground: Last Man Standing on 27 February 2021, in the quarterfinals of the Oktagon 70 kg tournament. He lost the fight by majority decision.

On 18 March 2022 Sugden faced Ibrahim Madi from France for the vacant ISKA K-1 World 63.5 kg title in Grantham, England. He won the fight by unanimous decision after five rounds.

Sugden made his first ISKA K-1 title defense against Pedro Ruiz on 11 March 2023. He won the fight by unanimous decision.

== Titles and achievements ==
=== Professional ===
- International Sport Kickboxing Association
  - 2022 ISKA K-1 World 63.5 kg Champion
- Glory
  - 2017 Road to Glory UK 65 kg Tournament runner-up

=== Amateur ===
- International Sport Kickboxing Association
  - ISKA K1 English Champion
- JFCC KIkcboxing
  - 2x JFCC Five Nations Full Contact Champion
- World Kickboxing Association
  - WKA British Open Champion
  - 2009 WKA World Championships U-12 +45 kg Champion
  - 2009 WKA British Championships U-12 +45 kg Champion

== Fight record ==
Professional Kickboxing record
15 Wins (3 (T)KO's), 7 Losses, 0 draw, 1 No Contest
Date	Result	Opponent	Event	Location	Method	Round	Time
2023-06-24	Loss	(Japan) Takeru	MTGP Impact in Paris	Paris, France	KO (Head kick)	5	2:58
For the vacant ISKA K-1 and KGP World Lightweight (−61.2 kg) titles.
2023-03-11	Win	(Spain) Pedro Ruiz	FIGHT MAX Superstar Fight League	Grantham, England	Decision (Unanimous)	5	3:00
Defends the ISKA K-1 World −63.5kg title.
2022-03-18	Win	(France) Ibrahim Madi	FIGHT MAX Superstar Fight League	Grantham, England	Decision (unanimous)	5	3:00
Wins the vacant ISKA K-1 World −63.5kg title.
2021-10-09	Win	(France) Matthieu Guevara	Road to ONE: Muay Thai Grand Prix	London, United Kingdom	Decision (Unanimous)	3	3:00
2021-02-27	Loss	(Czech Republic) Václav Sivák	Oktagon Underground – Last Man Standing, Quarter-final	Prague, Czech Republic	Decision (majority)	3	3:00
2019-11-23	Win	(United States) John Morehouse	Glory 72: Chicago	Chicago, USA	TKO (Referee stoppage)	1	2:12
2019-09-28	Loss	(United States) Asa Ten Pow	Glory 68: Miami	Miami, USA	Decision (Unanimous)	3	3:00
2019-05-17	Loss	(Thailand) Thong Fairtex	Glory 65: Utrecht	Utrecht, Netherlands	Decision (Split)	3	3:00
2019-02-01	Win	(New Zealand) Quade Taranaki	Glory 63: Houston	Houston, USA	Decision (Unanimous)	3	3:00
2018-09-14	Loss	(Uzbekistan) Anvar Boynazarov	Glory 58:Chicago	Chicago, USA	Decision (Split)	3	3:00
2018-06-02	NC	(Russia) Aleksei Ulianov	Glory 54: Birmingham	Birmingham, United Kingdom	No Contest (head clash)	2	1:10
2018-03-31	Loss	(Netherlands) Zakaria Zouggary	Glory 52: Los Angeles	Los Angeles, United States	Decision (Unanimous)	3	3:00
2017-12-09	Win	(China) Zhang Chenglong	Glory 49: Rotterdam	Rotterdam, Netherlands	Decision (Unanimous)	3	3:00
2017-10-07	Win	(Spain) Jorge Rodríguez Dávila	Road to Glory UK 70 kg Tournament	Grantham, England	Decision (Majority)	3	3:00
2017-07-14	Win	(United States) Arthur Sorsor	Glory 43: New York	New York City, United States	Decision (Unanimous)	3	3:00
2017-03-11	Loss	(United Kingdom) Mo Abdurahman	Road to Glory UK 65 kg Tournament, Final	Grantham, England	Decision (Unanimous)	3	3:00
2017-03-11	Win	(Romania) Adrian Maxim	Road to Glory UK 65 kg Tournament, Semi-finals	Grantham, England	Decision (Majority)	3	3:00
2017-03-11	Win	(United Kingdom) Andrew Liddell	Road to Glory UK 65 kg Tournament, Quarter-finals	Grantham, England	TKO (Knee to the body)	3	1:40
2016-10-01	Win	(United Kingdom) Irtaza Haider	Rookies Rumble	Newark-on-Trent, England	Decision (Unanimous)	3	3:00
2016-07-02	Win	(United Kingdom) Robert Barry	Home Show	Blyth, England	Decision (Unanimous)	3	3:00
2015-04-11	Win	(United Kingdom) Vinny Baldwin	Superstar Fight League 2	Newark-on-Trent, England	TKO	1	
2015-03-21	Win	(United Kingdom) Joe Himsworth	Future Stars League, Final	Harrow, London, England	Decision (Unanimous)	3	3:00
2015-03-21	Win	(United Kingdom) Luke Portrainer	Future Stars League, Semi-final	Harrow, London, England	Decision (Unanimous)	3	3:00
Legend: Win Loss Draw/No contest Notes
