= Kevin VanNostrand =

American kickboxer

- Born: April 16, 1987 (age 39); Syracuse, New York, US
- Nationality: American
- Height: 5 ft 11 in (180 cm)
- Weight: 142.6 lb (65 kg; 10 st 3 lb)
- Division: Featherweight
- Reach: 72.5 in (184 cm)
- Fighting out of: Syracuse, New York, US
- Trainer: Jim Andrello

Kickboxing record
- Total: 24
- Wins: 20
- By knockout: 13
- Losses: 3
- Draws: 1

Kevin Louis VanNostrand (born April 16, 1987) is an American kickboxer and former Interim Glory Featherweight Champion. A professional kickboxer since 2015, he started martial arts at the age of 8, and became an amateur Muay Thai fighter in 2002. As of July 2021, he is the #6 ranked featherweight, according to Combat Press.

== Kickboxing career ==
=== Early career ===
VanNostrand's professional career started against Canadian Kickboxer "The Professor" Chris Williams. A spinning elbow to Williams's chin ended the fight. VanNostrand knocked out Aaron Castellvi in Lockport NY at Legends Rise event, in view of his idol Mike Tyson.

=== Glory Kickboxing ===
VanNostrand's first Glory Kickboxing competition was a Glory 19 under-card fight against Carlos Lopez. The referee called the fight in the first round for the three knockdown rule.

Justin Houghton fought VanNostrand at Glory 24: Denver, for a judge's split decision going to VanNostrand.

Glory 27: New Jersey co-headline event was VanNostrand and Giga Chikadze with a unanimous decision going to Chikadze.

Super-fight series of Glory 33: New Jersey pitted David Moore against VanNostrand. The referee called a second-round TKO win to VanNostrand.

At Madison Square Garden Glory 43 Featherweight Contender Tournament, Giga Chikadze eliminated Aleksei Ulianov in Bout A, while VanNostrand defeated Mo Abdurahman in Bout B. VanNostrand won a unanimous decision (30-26) over Chikadze in the finals. Matt Embree was originally scheduled to fight VanNostrand, but due to injury was replaced by Abdurahman.

An injury kept Robin van Roosmalen from defending the title at Glory 48:New York. An interim title belt was held between Anvar Boynazarov and VanNostrand. Boynazarov knocked VanNostrand down with a left hook just eighteen seconds into the first round, VanNostrand returned with a knee to the liver fifty seconds into the fight, resulting in a knockout with an official time of 1:06 in the first round.

A unification bout between van Roosmalen and VanNostrand for undisputed Glory Featherweight Championship was at Glory 52: Los Angeles on March 31, 2018. Van Roosmalen won the fight via a unanimous decision.

He was scheduled to fight against Massaro Glunder, returning to Madison Square Garden for Glory 55: New York. On July 20, 2018, VanNostrand fought Petchpanomrung Kiatmookao for the Interim Glory Featherweight Championship, due to Robin van Roosmalen's shoulder injury during training. The fight went to judges' scorecards with a split decision to Petch. The fight was plagued with illegal sweeps and clinching.

The fight between VanNostrand and Massaro Glunder was rescheduled for November 2 in the Hammerstein Ballroom at Glory 61: New York. Massaro got a knockdown in round two and received a holding call point deduction with 17 seconds remaining in the fight. All three judges scored 28-27 in VanNostrand's favor.

Serhiy Adamchuk fought VanNostrand on July 5 at Glory 67: Orlando. The fight was rumored to decide the next challenger for the Featherweight belt. VanNostrand won via a unanimous decision.

A rematch was scheduled for Anvar Boynazarov and VanNostrand during the back-to-back events Glory 71: Chicago and Glory 72: Chicago. Aleksei Ulianov had visa problems, and VanNostrand was moved to the main event against Petch. The first round had very little clinching, though clinching similar to their first fight plagued the following rounds. A point was deducted from Kiatmookao at the end of the fifth round. Two judges scored the fight 47-47 for a majority draw. The belt stayed with the current champion.

VanNostrand faced Luis Morales at Lace Up: The Rise of Champions on October 2, 2021, under Glory Kickboxing rules. Morales was knocked down twice in the first round and twice in the second round. Under Glory rules, four knockdowns in a fight is a technical knockout.

== Kickboxing record ==
Kickboxing record
20 wins (13 (T)KOs), 3 losses, 1 draw
| Date | Result | Opponent | Event | Location | Method | Round | Time | Notes |
| 2021-10-02 | Win | (United States) Luis Morales | Lace Up: The Rise of Champions | Syracuse, New York | TKO (4 knockdowns) | 2 | 1:26 | |
| 2019-11-23 | Draw | (Thailand) Petchpanomrung Kiatmookao | Glory 72: Chicago | Chicago, Illinois | Draw (majority) | 5 | 3:00 | For the Glory Featherweight Championship |
For The Glory Featherweight Title.
| 2019-07-05 | Win | (Ukraine) Serhiy Adamchuk | Glory 67: Orlando | Orlando, Florida | Decision (unanimous) | 3 | 3:00 | |
| 2018-11-02 | Win | (Netherlands) Massaro Glunder | Glory 61: New York | New York City, New York | Decision (unanimous) | 3 | 3:00 | |
| 2018-07-20 | Loss | (Thailand) Petchpanomrung Kiatmookao | Glory 55: New York | New York City, New York | Decision (split) | 5 | 3:00 | For the Interim Glory Featherweight Championship |
For The Glory Featherweight Interim Title.
| 2018-03-31 | Loss | (Netherlands) Robin van Roosmalen | Glory 52: Los Angeles | Los Angeles, California | Decision (unanimous) | 5 | 3:00 | Unification of Glory Featherweight Championship |
For The Glory Featherweight Title.
| 2017-12-01 | Win | (Uzbekistan) Anvar Boynazarov | Glory 48: New York | New York City, New York | KO (knee to the body) | 1 | 1:06 | For the Interim Glory Featherweight Championship |
For The Glory Featherweight Interim Title.
| 2017-07-14 | Win | (Georgia (country)) Giga Chikadze | Glory 43: New York | New York City, New York | Decision (unanimous) | 3 | 3:00 | Featherweight Contender Tournament Final |
For The Featherweight Contender Tournament Finale.
| 2017-07-14 | Win | (England) Mo Abdurahman | Glory 43: New York | New York City, New York | TKO (2 knockdowns) | 1 | 1:50 | Featherweight Contender Tournament Semi-Finals |
| 2017-05-06 | Win | (United States) DJ Miller | Firepower | Syracuse, New York | Decision (unanimous) | 5 | 3:00 | |
| 2016-10-08 | Win | (United States) Evander Russ | Supremacy | Syracuse, New York | KO (kick to the body) | 1 | 1:17 | |
| 2016-09-09 | Win | (United States) David Moore | Glory 33: New Jersey | Trenton, New Jersey | TKO (referee stoppage) | 2 | 0:35 | |
| 2016-04-30 | Win | (Thailand) Kaichon Pongthong | East vs. West | Syracuse, New York | Decision (unanimous) | 5 | 3:00 | |
| 2016-02-26 | Loss | (Georgia (country)) Giga Chikadze | Glory 27: Chicago | Hoffman Estates, Illinois | Decision (unanimous) | 3 | 3:00 | |
| 2015-10-09 | Win | (United States) Justin Houghton | Glory 24: Denver | Denver, Colorado | Decision (split) | 3 | 3:00 | |
| 2015-09-26 | Win | (United States) Ben Pride | Judgement Day | Syracuse, New York | KO | 2 | | |
| 2015-06-13 | Win | (United States) Justin Greskiewicz | Supremacy | Lockport, New York | TKO (referee stoppage) | 1 | 2:08 | |
| 2015-03-28 | Win | (United States) Levi Rose | Beasts Unleashed | Syracuse, New York | KO (kick to the head) | 1 | 2:02 | |
| 2015-02-06 | Win | (United States) Carlos Lopez | Glory 19: Virginia | Hampton, Virginia | TKO (3 knockdowns) | 1 | 2:05 | Under-Card Fight |
| 2014-11-15 | Win | (United States) Aaron Castellvi | Legends Rise | Lockport, New York | KO | 3 | 0:34 | |
| 2014-10-11 | Win | (United States) Jake Bohn | War Zone | Syracuse, New York | KO | 1 | 1:23 | |
| 2014-05-31 | Win | (Brazil) Alexandre "Popo" Bezerra | Rise of Champions | Syracuse, New York | Decision (unanimous) | 5 | 3:00 | |
| 2014-03-22 | Win | (United States) Niko (Greko) Tsigaras | CSC 39 | Richmond, Virginia | Decision (unanimous) | 3 | 3:00 | |
| 2013-10-19 | Win | (United States) Chris “The Professor” Williams | | Syracuse, New York | KO (spinning elbow) | | | |
Legend: Win Loss Draw/no contest Notes

== See also ==
- List of male kickboxers
