= 2017 in Glory =

Kickboxing events

Information
- First date: January 20, 2017
- Last date: December 9, 2017

Events
- Total events: 15

The year 2017 was the sixth year in the history of Glory, an international kickboxing event. The year started with Glory 37: Los Angeles. The events were broadcast through television agreements with ESPN and other regional channels around the world.

== Glory 2017 Awards ==
The following fighters won the GLORY Kickboxing year-end awards for 2017:

- Glory Fighter of the Year 2017: Rico Verhoeven
- Glory Fight of the Year 2017: Chenglong Zhang vs. Masaya Kubo
- Glory Knockout of the Year 2017: Rico Verhoeven against Jamal Ben Saddik
- Glory Knockout Kick of the Year 2017: Stoyan Koprivlenski against Maykol Yurk
- Glory Upset of the Year 2017: Elvis Gashi against Josh Jauncey
- Glory Newcomer of the Year 2017: Anissa Meksen
- Glory Comeback of the Year 2017: Kevin Van Nostrand against Anvar Boynazarov

== List of events ==
#	Event title	Date	Arena	Location
1	Glory 37: Los Angeles	January 20, 2017	The Novo by Microsoft	(United States) Los Angeles, California, US
2	Glory 38: Chicago	February 24, 2017	Sears Centre	(United States) Hoffman Estates, Illinois, US
3	Road to Glory UK 1	March 11, 2017	Grantham Meres Leisure Centre	Grantham, England
4	Glory 39: Brussels	March 25, 2017	Vorst National	Brussels, Belgium
5	Glory 40: Copenhagen	April 29, 2017	Forum Copenhagen	Copenhagen, Denmark
6	Glory 41: Holland	May 20, 2017	Brabanthallen	Den Bosch, Netherlands
7	Glory 42: Paris	June 10, 2017	AccorHotels Arena	Paris, France
8	Glory 43: New York	July 14, 2017	The Theater at Madison Square Garden	(United States) New York City, New York, US
9	Glory 44: Chicago	August 25, 2017	Sears Centre	(United States) Hoffman Estates, Illinois, US
10	Glory 45: Amsterdam	September 30, 2017	Sporthallen Zuid	Amsterdam, Netherlands
11	Road to Glory UK 2	October 7, 2017	Grantham Meres Leisure Centre	Grantham, England
12	Glory 46: China	October 14, 2017	Guangzhou Gymnasium	Guangzhou, China
13	Glory 47: Lyon	October 28, 2017	Palais des Sports de Gerland	Lyon, France
14	Glory 48: New York	December 1, 2017	The Theater at Madison Square Garden	(United States) New York City, New York, US
15	Glory 49: Rotterdam	December 9, 2017	Rotterdam Ahoy	Rotterdam, Netherlands

== Glory 37: Los Angeles ==
Glory 37: Los Angeles
- Promotion: Glory
- Date: January 20, 2017
- Venue: The Novo by Microsoft
- City: (United States) Los Angeles, California, US

Event chronology
Glory 36: Oberhausen	Glory 37: Los Angeles	Glory 38: Chicago

Glory 37: Los Angeles was a kickboxing event held on January 20, 2017 at The Novo by Microsoft in Los Angeles, California, US.

=== Background ===
This event featured two world title fight for the Middleweight Championship between Jason Wilnis and Israel Adesanya as headliner, also the show featured 4-Man Welterweight Contender Tournament.

Robin van Roosmalen missed weight and was stripped of the Featherweight Championship. Only Embree has fought for the vacant Featherweight Championship.

=== Results ===
Glory 37
Weight Class				Method	Round	Time	Notes
Middleweight 85 kg	(Netherlands) Jason Wilnis (c)	def.	(New Zealand) Israel Adesanya	Decision (Unanimous)	5	3:00	For the Glory Middleweight Championship
Welterweight 77 kg	(Switzerland) Yoann Kongolo	def.	(France) Karim Benmansour	KO (Punches)	3	2:57	Welterweight Contender Tournament Final
Heavyweight 120 kg	(Brazil) Guto Inocente	def.	(Curaçao) D'Angelo Marshall	Decision (Extra Round)	4	3:00	
Welterweight 77 kg	(France) Karim Benmansour	def.	(Argentina) Alan Scheinson	Decision (Split)	3	3:00	Welterweight Contender Tournament Semi-Finals
Welterweight 77 kg	(Switzerland) Yoann Kongolo	def.	(Russia) Konstantin Khuzin	Decision (Unanimous)	3	3:00	Welterweight Contender Tournament Semi-Finals
Superfight Series
Featherweight 65 kg	(Netherlands) Robin van Roosmalen	def.	(Canada) Matt Embree	TKO (Punches)	4	2:00	
Heavyweight 120 kg	(Brazil) Jhonata Diniz	def.	(Slovakia) Tomáš Možný	Decision (Unanimous)	3	3:00	
Middleweight 85 kg	(United States) Warren Thompson	def.	(United States) Mike Lemaire	Decision (Unanimous)	3	3:00	
Women's Super Bantamweight 55 kg	(United States) Zoila Frausto	def.	(Germany) Daniela Graf	Decision (Unanimous)	3	3:00	
Featherweight 65 kg	(Georgia (country)) Giga Chikadze	def.	(France) Victor Pinto	KO (Liver Kick)	1	2:03	

=== 2017 Glory Welterweight Contender Tournament bracket ===
Semi-finals
(Russia) Konstantin Khuzin	3r.
(Switzerland) Yoann Kongolo	DEC
(France) Karim Benmansour	DEC
(Argentina) Alan Scheinson	3r.

Final
(Switzerland) Yoann Kongolo	TKO
(France) Karim Benmansour	3r.

== Glory 38: Chicago ==
Glory 38: Chicago
- Promotion: Glory
- Date: February 24, 2017
- Venue: Sears Centre
- City: (United States) Hoffman Estates, Illinois, US

Event chronology
Glory 37: Los Angeles	Glory 38: Chicago	Road to Glory UK

Glory 38: Chicago was a kickboxing event held on February 24, 2017 at the Sears Centre in Hoffman Estates, Illinois, US.

=== Background ===
This event featured a world title fight for the Glory Light Heavyweight Championship between Artem Vakhitov and Saulo Cavalari as headliner, and 4-Man Light Heavyweight Contender Tournament to earn a title shot for the Glory Light Heavyweight Championship.

The Superfight Series was originally expected to be co-headlined by Cătălin Moroșanu and Chi Lewis-Parry. However, Lewis-Parry pulled out of the Fight, so Moroșanu faced Maurice Greene.

Zack Mwekassa was pulled from the tournament by the Illinois State Athletic Commission early on Friday morning for undisclosed medical issues and Zinedine Hameur-Lain faced Brian Collette.

=== Result ===
Glory 38
Weight Class				Method	Round	Time	Notes
Light Heavyweight 95 kg	(Russia) Artem Vakhitov (c)	def.	(Brazil) Saulo Cavalari	TKO (Punches)	2	2:43	For the Glory Light Heavyweight Championship
Light Heavyweight 95 kg	(Brazil) Ariel Machado	def.	(France) Zinedine Hameur-Lain	TKO (Punches)	1	2:43	Light Heavyweight Contender Tournament Final
Welterweight 77 kg	(France) Antoine Pinto	def.	(United States) Richard Abraham	Decision (Split)	3	3:00	
Light Heavyweight 95 kg	(Brazil) Ariel Machado	def.	(Democratic Republic of the Congo) Danyo Ilunga	Decision (Unanimous)	3	3:00	Light Heavyweight Contender Tournament Semi-Finals
Light Heavyweight 95 kg	(France) Zinedine Hameur-Lain	def.	(United States) Brian Collette	KO (Punch)	2	2:46	Light Heavyweight Contender Tournament Semi-Finals
Superfight Series
Heavyweight 120 kg	(Romania) Benjamin Adegbuyi	def.	(Brazil) Anderson Silva	Decision (Extra Round)	4	3:00	
Heavyweight 120 kg	(Romania) Cătălin Moroșanu	def.	(United States) Maurice Greene	KO (Punch)	2	0:23	
Welterweight 77 kg	(Netherlands) Murthel Groenhart	def.	(Thailand) Thongchai	KO (Punches)	3	1:45	
Welterweight 77 kg	(Mexico) Daniel Morales	def.	(Poland) Paweł Jędrzejczyk	Decision (Unanimous)	3	3:00	
Lightweight 70 kg	(Denmark) Niclas Larsen	def.	(Poland) Łukasz Pławecki	Decision (Unanimous)	3	3:00	

=== 2017 Glory Light Heavyweight Contender Tournament bracket ===
Semi-finals
(United States) Brian Collette	2r.
(France) Zinedine Hameur-Lain	KO
(Democratic Republic of the Congo) Danyo Ilunga	3r.
(Brazil) Ariel Machado	DEC

Final
(France) Zinedine Hameur-Lain	1r.
(Brazil) Ariel Machado	TKO

== Road to Glory UK 65 kg Tournament ==
Road to Glory UK 65 kg Tournament
- Promotion: Glory
- Date: March 11, 2017
- Venue: Grantham Meres Leisure Centre
- City: Grantham, England

Event chronology
Glory 38: Chicago	Road to Glory UK 65 kg Tournament	Glory 39: Brussels

Road to Glory UK 65 kg Tournament was a kickboxing event held on March 11, 2017 at the Grantham Meres Leisure Centre in Grantham, England.

=== Results ===
Road to Glory UK
Weight Class				Method	Round	Time	Notes
Featherweight 65 kg	(England) Mo Abdurahman	def.	(England) Bailey Sugden	Decision (Unanimous)	3	3:00	Featherweight Road to Glory Tournament Final
Welterweight 77 kg	(England) Jamie Bates	def.	(England) Kev Ward	Decision (Unanimous)	3	3:00	
Lightweight 70 kg	(England) William Goldie-Galloway	def.	(England) Vinny Church	KO (Punches)	2	2:17	
Featherweight 65 kg	(England) Mo Abdurahman	def.	(England) Joe Himsworth	Ko (Punch)	2	2:00	Featherweight Road to Glory Tournament Semi-Finals
Featherweight 65 kg	(England) Bailey Sugden	def.	(Romania) Adrian Maxim	Decision (Majority)	3	3:00	Featherweight Road to Glory Tournament Semi-Finals
Catchweight 72.5 kg	(England) Ammari Diedrick	def.	(England) Marcus Powell	Decision (Majority)	3	3:00	
Featherweight 65 kg	(England) Joe Himsworth	def.	(England) Gary Laws	TKO (2 Knockdowns Rule)	1	2:24	Featherweight Road to Glory Tournament Quarter-Finals
Featherweight 65 kg	(England) Mo Abdurahman	def.	(England) Matthew Gordon	TKO (2 Knockdowns Rule)	2	2:30	Featherweight Road to Glory Tournament Quarter-Finals
Featherweight 65 kg	(Romania) Adrian Maxim	def.	(Italy) Matteo de Rosa	Decision (Unanimous)	3	3:00	Featherweight Road to Glory Tournament Quarter-Finals
Featherweight 65 kg	(England) Bailey Sugden	def.	(England) Andrew Liddell	TKO (Knee to the Body)	3	1:40	Featherweight Road to Glory Tournament Quarter-Finals

== Glory 39: Brussels ==
Glory 39: Brussels
- Promotion: Glory
- Date: March 25, 2017
- Venue: Vorst National
- City: Brussels, Belgium

Event chronology
Road to Glory UK	Glory 39: Brussels	Glory 40: Copenhagen

Glory 39: Brussels was a kickboxing event held on March 25, 2017 at the Vorst National in Brussels, Belgium.

=== Background ===
This event featured two world title fight for the Glory Welterweight Championship between Cedric Doumbe and Yoann Kongolo as Glory 39 headliner, for the Glory Lightweight Championship between Sitthichai Sitsongpeenong and Dylan Salvador as Superfight Series headliner. Also this event featured 4-Man Featherweight Contender Tournament.

Hysni Beqiri had to withdraw from Glory 39, because of an injury in a car accident. Anton Petrov filled in for Beqiri against Marat Grigorian.

French veteran Karim Benmansour no longer competed at Glory 39 as he required additional time off to recover from surgery. Therefore, Harut Grigorian faced a new opponent, Pavol Garaj.

Due to visa issue, Anvar Boynazarov no longer competed in the Glory 39 featherweight contender tournament. His slot was filled by Nafi Bilalovski.

Chi Lewis-Parry had to withdraw due to illness, the fight with Hesdy Gerges was off.

=== Results ===
Glory 39
Weight Class				Method	Round	Time	Notes
Welterweight 77 kg	(France) Cedric Doumbe (c)	def.	(Switzerland) Yoann Kongolo	Decision (Unanimous)	5	3:00	For the Glory Welterweight Championship
Featherweight 65 kg	(Thailand) Petchpanomrung Kiatmookao	def.	(Ukraine) Serhiy Adamchuk	Decision (Split)	3	3:00	Featherweight Contender Tournament Final
Heavyweight 120 kg	(Morocco) Jamal Ben Saddik	def.	(Brazil) Guto Inocente	Decision (Unanimous)	3	3:00	
Featherweight 65 kg	(Ukraine) Serhiy Adamchuk	def.	(Belgium) Nafi Bilalovski	Decision (Unanimous)	3	3:00	Featherweight Contender Tournament Semi-Finals
Featherweight 65 kg	(Thailand) Petchpanomrung Kiatmookao	def.	(Russia) Aleksei Ulianov	Decision (Unanimous)	3	3:00	Featherweight Contender Tournament Semi-Finals
Superfight Series
Lightweight 70 kg	(Thailand) Sitthichai Sitsongpeenong (c)	def.	(France) Dylan Salvador	TKO (Knee to the Body)	4	2:58	For the Glory Lightweight Championship
Lightweight 70 kg	(Armenia) Marat Grigorian	def.	(Bulgaria) Anton Petrov	TKO (Leg Kick)	2	1:59	
Lightweight 70 kg	(China) Meng Qinghao	def.	(France) Killian Moulun	Decision (Split)	3	3:00	
Welterweight 77 kg	(Armenia) Harut Grigorian	def.	(Slovakia) Pavol Garaj	Decision (Unanimous)	3	3:00	
Lightweight 70 kg	(Morocco) Tyjani Beztati	def.	(Tunisia) Sabri Henia	TKO (3 Knockdowns)	2	2:05	

=== 2017 Glory Featherweight Contender Tournament bracket ===
Semi-finals
(Thailand) Petchpanomrung Kiatmookao	DEC
(Russia) Aleksei Ulianov	5-0
(Ukraine) Serhiy Adamchuk	DEC
(Belgium) Nafi Bilalovski	5-0

Final
(Thailand) Petchpanomrung Kiatmookao	DEC
(Ukraine) Serhiy Adamchuk	4-1

== Glory 40: Copenhagen ==
Glory 40: Copenhagen
- Promotion: Glory
- Date: April 29, 2017
- Venue: Forum Copenhagen
- City: Copenhagen, Denmark

Event chronology
Glory 39: Brussels	Glory 40: Copenhagen	Glory 41: Holland

Glory 40: Copenhagen was a kickboxing event held on April 29, 2017 at the Forum Copenhagen in Copenhagen, Denmark.

=== Background ===
This event featured a world title fight for the Glory Middleweight Championship between Jason Wilnis and Simon Marcus as headliner, and 4-Man Middleweight Contender Tournament to earn a title shot for the Glory Middleweight Championship.

=== Fight Card ===
Glory 40
Weight Class				Method	Round	Time	Notes
Middleweight 85 kg	(Canada) Simon Marcus	def.	(Netherlands) Jason Wilnis (c)	Decision (Split)	5	3:00	For the Glory Middleweight Championship
Middleweight 85 kg	(Tunisia) Yousri Belgaroui	def.	(Brazil) Alex Pereira	Decision (Unanimous)	3	3:00	Middleweight Contender Tournament Final
Lightweight 70 kg	(Denmark) Niclas Larsen	def.	(Thailand) Yodkhunpon Sitmonchai	Decision (Unanimous)	3	3:00	
Middleweight 85 kg	(Brazil) Alex Pereira	def.	(Sweden) Burim Rama	TKO (3 Knockdowns)	3	1:42	Middleweight Contender Tournament Semi-Finals
Middleweight 85 kg	(Tunisia) Yousri Belgaroui	def.	(Croatia) Agron Preteni	Decision (Unanimous)	3	3:00	Middleweight Contender Tournament Semi-Finals
Superfight Series
Welterweight 77 kg	(England) Jamie Bates	def.	(United States) Richard Abraham	Decision (Unanimous)	3	3:00	
Lightweight 70 kg	(Denmark) Mohammed El-Mir	def.	(Norway) Simón Santana	Decision (Unanimous)	3	3:00	
Light Heavyweight 95 kg	(France) Freddy Kemayo	def.	(Morocco) Imad Hadar	TKO (Punches)	2	2:21	
Lightweight 70 kg	(Canada) Josh Jauncey	def.	(Spain) Antonio Gómez	TKO (Doctor Stoppage)	2	1:05	
Featherweight 66 kg	(China) Yuhang Xie	def.	(United States) Chris Mauceri	Decision (Unanimous)	3	3:00	

=== 2017 Glory Middleweight Contender Tournament bracket ===
Semi-finals
(Brazil) Alex Pereira	DEC
(Sweden) Burim Rama	5-0
(Tunisia) Yousri Belgaroui	DEC
(Croatia) Agron Preteni	5-0

Final
(Tunisia) Yousri Belgaroui	DEC
(Brazil) Alex Pereira	5-0

== Glory 41: Holland ==
Glory 41: Holland
- Promotion: Glory
- Date: May 20, 2017
- Venue: Brabanthallen
- City: Den Bosch, Netherlands

Event chronology
Glory 40: Copenhagen	Glory 41: Holland	Glory 42: Paris

Glory 41: Holland was a kickboxing event held on May 20, 2017 at the Brabanthallen in Den Bosch, Netherlands.

=== Background ===
Bonus awards:

The following fighters were awarded $5,000 bonuses:

- Fighter of the Night: Petchpanomrung Kiatmookao
- Knockout of the Night: D'Angelo Marshall

=== Results ===
Glory 41
Weight Class				Method	Round	Time	Notes
Heavyweight 120 kg	(Netherlands) Hesdy Gerges	def.	(Czech Republic) Tomáš Hron	Decision (Unanimous)	3	3:00	
Heavyweight 120 kg	(Curaçao) D'Angelo Marshall	def.	(Brazil) Anderson Silva	Decision (Unanimous)	3	3:00	Heavyweight Contender Tournament Final
Featherweight 66 kg	(China) Chenglong Zhang	def.	(Cape Verde) Wilson Sanches Mendes	Decision (Unanimous)	3	3:00	
Heavyweight 120 kg	(Curaçao) D'Angelo Marshall	def.	(Germany) Mohamed Abdallah	TKO (2 knockdowns)	1	0:48	Heavyweight Contender Tournament Semi-Finals
Heavyweight 120 kg	(Brazil) Anderson Silva	def.	(Greece) Giannis Stoforidis	TKO (Punches)	2	2:24	Heavyweight Contender Tournament Semi-Finals
Superfight Series
Heavyweight 120 kg	(Netherlands) Rico Verhoeven	def.	(Morocco) Ismael Lazaar	Decision (Unanimous)	5	3:00	
Featherweight 65 kg	(Netherlands) Robin van Roosmalen	def.	(Thailand) Petchpanomrung Kiatmookao	Decision (Majority)	5	3:00	For the vacant Glory Featherweight Championship
Welterweight 77 kg	(Suriname) Murthel Groenhart	def.	(Argentina) Alan Scheinson	Decision (Split)	3	3:00	
Light Heavyweight 95 kg	(Tunisia) Mourad Bouzidi	def.	(Netherlands) Michael Duut	DQ (3 Point Deductions)	2	2:18	
Lightweight 70 kg	(Morocco) Tyjani Beztati	def.	(Denmark) Youssef Assouik	Decision (Unanimous)	3	3:00	
Lightweight 70 kg	(Netherlands) Zakaria Zouggary	def.	(Turkey) Yetkin Ozkul	Decision (Unanimous)	3	3:00	

=== 2017 Glory Heavyweight Contender Tournament bracket ===
Semi-finals
(Brazil) Anderson Silva	2r.
(Greece) Giannis Stoforidis	TKO
(Curaçao) D'Angelo Marshall	1r.
(Germany) Mohamed Abdallah	TKO

Final
(Brazil) Anderson Silva	5-0
(Curaçao) D'Angelo Marshall	DEC

== Glory 42: Paris ==
Glory 42: Paris
- Promotion: Glory
- Date: June 10, 2017
- Venue: AccorHotels Arena
- City: Paris, France

Event chronology
Glory 41: Holland	Glory 42: Paris	Glory 43: New York

Glory 42: Paris was a kickboxing event held on June 10, 2017 at the AccorHotels Arena in Paris, France.

=== Background ===
Bonus awards:

The following fighters were awarded $5,000 bonuses:

- Fighter of the Night: Yoann Kongolo
- Knockout of the Night: Massaro Glunder

=== Results ===
Glory 42
Weight Class				Method	Round	Time	Notes
Welterweight 77 kg	(France) Cedric Doumbe (c)	def.	(Netherlands) Nieky Holzken	Decision (Split)	5	3:00	For the Glory Welterweight Championship
Lightweight 70 kg	(Angola) Christian Baya	def.	(Netherlands) Massaro Glunder	Decision (Split)	3	3:00	Lightweight Contender Tournament Final
Welterweight 77 kg	(Netherlands) Murthel Groenhart	def.	(Armenia) Harut Grigorian	KO (Punch)	2	0:20	
Lightweight 70 kg	(Netherlands) Massaro Glunder	def.	(Denmark) Niclas Larsen	TKO (2 Knockdowns)	1	2:18	Lightweight Contender Tournament Semi-Finals
Lightweight 70 kg	(Angola) Christian Baya	def.	(Russia) Anatoly Moiseev	Decision (Split)	3	3:00	Lightweight Contender Tournament Semi-Finals
Superfight Series
Welterweight 77 kg	(Switzerland) Yoann Kongolo	def.	(France) Yohan Lidon	Decision (Unanimous)	3	3:00	
Heavyweight 120 kg	(France) Nicolas Wamba	def.	(Brazil) Jhonata Diniz	Decision (Unanimous)	3	3:00	
Light Heavyweight 95 kg	(France) Zinedine Hameur-Lain	def.	(France) Freddy Kemayo	KO (Head Kick)	1	2:35	
Featherweight 65 kg	(Ukraine) Serhiy Adamchuk	def.	(France) Dylan Salvador	Decision (Unanimous)	3	3:00	
Welterweight 70 kg	(Armenia) Marat Grigorian	def.	(Spain) Antonio Gómez	KO (Knee to the Body)	2	2:02	
Welterweight 77 kg	(Guyana) Rémy Vectol	def.	(United States) Francois Ambang	Decision (Unanimous)	3	3:00	

=== 2017 Glory Lightweight Contender Tournament bracket ===
Semi-finals
(Angola) Christian Baya	DEC
(Russia) Anatoly Moiseev	3-2
(Netherlands) Massaro Glunder	TKO
(Denmark) Niclas Larsen	1r.

Final
(Angola) Christian Baya	DEC
(Netherlands) Massaro Glunder	4-1

== Glory 43: New York ==
Glory 43: New York
- Promotion: Glory
- Date: July 14, 2017
- Venue: The Theater at Madison Square Garden
- City: (United States) New York City, New York, US

Event chronology
Glory 42: Paris	Glory 43: New York	Glory 44: Chicago

Glory 43: New York was a kickboxing event held on July 14, 2017 at The Theater at Madison Square Garden in New York City, New York, US.

=== Background ===
This event featured a fight between No. 1 heavyweight contender Benjamin Adegbuyi and Guto Inocente as headliner, and a light heavyweight pairing between Pavel Zhuravlev and Saulo Cavalari For the Interim Glory Light Heavyweight Championship as Superfight Series headliner.

This event also featured a 4-Man Featherweight Contender Tournament to earn a shot at the Glory Featherweight Championship.

Bonus awards:

The following fighters were awarded $5,000 bonuses:

- Fighter of the Night: Elvis Gashi
- Knockout of the Night: Chenchen Li

=== Results ===
Glory 43
Weight Class				Method	Round	Time	Notes
Heavyweight 120 kg	(Brazil) Guto Inocente	def.	(Romania) Benjamin Adegbuyi	Decision (Split)	3	3:00	
Featherweight 65 kg	(United States) Kevin VanNostrand	def.	(Georgia (country)) Giga Chikadze	Decision (Unanimous)	3	3:00	Featherweight Contender Tournament Final
Lightweight 70 kg	(Albania) Elvis Gashi	def.	(Canada) Josh Jauncey	TKO (3 Knockdowns)	2	2:59	
Featherweight 65 kg	(United States) Kevin VanNostrand	def.	(England) Mo Abdurahman	TKO (2 Knockdowns)	1	1:50	Featherweight Contender Tournament Semi-Finals
Featherweight 65 kg	(Georgia (country)) Giga Chikadze	def.	(Russia) Aleksei Ulianov	Decision (Split)	3	3:00	Featherweight Contender Tournament Semi-Finals
Superfight Series
Light Heavyweight 95 kg	(Ukraine) Pavel Zhuravlev	def.	(Brazil) Saulo Cavalari	Decision (Unanimous)	3	3:00	For the Interim Glory Light Heavyweight Championship
Featherweight 65 kg	(England) Bailey Sugden	def.	(United States) Arthur Sorsor	Decision (Unanimous)	3	3:00	
Middleweight 85 kg	(United States) Joe Taylor	def.	(United States) Ariel Sepúlveda	TKO (3 Knockdowns)	2	2:55	
Women's Super Bantamweight 55 kg	(France) Anissa Meksen	def.	(Brazil) Jady Menezes	Decision (Unanimous)	3	3:00	
Lightweight 70 kg	(Israel) Itay Gershon	def.	(Poland) Rafał Dudek	Decision (Unanimous)	3	3:00	
Featherweight 65 kg	(China) Chenchen Li	def.	(United States) Terrance Hill	KO (Punch)	1	1:45	

=== 2017 Glory Featherweight Contender Tournament 2 bracket ===
Semi-finals
(United States) Kevin VanNostrand	TKO
(England) Mo Abdurahman	1r.
(Georgia (country)) Giga Chikadze	DEC
(Russia) Aleksei Ulianov	2-1

Final
(United States) Kevin VanNostrand	DEC
(Georgia (country)) Giga Chikadze	3-0

== Glory 44: Chicago ==
Glory 44: Chicago
- Promotion: Glory
- Date: August 25, 2017
- Venue: Sears Centre
- City: (United States) Hoffman Estates, Illinois, US

Event chronology
Glory 43: New York	Glory 44: Chicago	Glory 45: Amsterdam

Glory 44: Chicago was a kickboxing event held on August 25, 2017 at the Sears Centre in Hoffman Estates, Illinois, US.

=== Background ===
This event features the rematch between Cedric Doumbe and Murthel Groenhart for the Glory Welterweight Championship as Glory 44: Chicago headliner, and a Women's Super Bantamweight pairing between Tiffany van Soest and Funda Alkayis for the Glory Women's Super Bantamweight Championship as Superfight Series headliner as well as Cătălin Moroșanu looking to have yet another crazy brawl. Also on the fight card is Chicago-native Richard Abraham against Daniel Morales.

This event also features a 4-Man Welterweight Contender Tournament to earn a shot at the Glory Welterweight Championship.

Bonus awards:

The following fighters will be awarded $5,000 bonuses:

- Fighter of the Night: Harut Grigorian
- Knockout of the Night: Robert Thomas

=== Fight card ===
Glory 44
Weight Class				Method	Round	Time	Notes
Welterweight 77 kg	(Suriname) Murthel Groenhart	def.	(France) Cedric Doumbe (c)	Decision (Split)	5	3:00	For the Glory Welterweight Championship
Welterweight 77 kg	(Armenia) Harut Grigorian	def.	(France) Antoine Pinto	Decision (Unanimous)	3	3:00	Welterweight Contender Tournament Final
Welterweight 77 kg	(United States) Richard Abraham	def.	(Mexico) Daniel Morales	Decision (Unanimous)	3	3:00	
Welterweight 77 kg	(France) Antoine Pinto	def.	(United States) Zach Bunnell	Decision (Unanimous)	3	3:00	Welterweight Contender Tournament Semi-Finals
Welterweight 77 kg	(Armenia) Harut Grigorian	def.	(France) Karim Benmansour	Decision (Unanimous)	3	3:00	Welterweight Contender Tournament Semi-Finals
Superfight Series
Women's Super Bantamweight 55 kg	(United States) Tiffany van Soest (c)	def.	(Germany) Meryem Uslu	TKO (Punches)	4	0:36	For the Glory Women's Super Bantamweight Championship
Heavyweight 120 kg	(Poland) Michał Turyński	def.	(Romania) Cătălin Moroșanu	Decision (Split)	3	3:00	
Middleweight 85 kg	(United States) Dustin Jacoby	def.	(United States) Sean Choice	TKO (3 Knockdowns)	1	2:18	
Middleweight 85 kg	(Canada) Robert Thomas	def.	(United States) Warren Thompson	KO (Punches)	3	2:36	
Lightweight 70 kg	(United States) Nate Richardson	def.	(Poland) Rafał Dudek	Decision (Unanimous)	3	3:00	
Featherweight 65 kg	(France) Victor Pinto	def.	(Romania) Adrian Maxim	Decision (Split)	3	3:00	

=== 2017 Glory Welterweight Contender Tournament 2 bracket ===
Semi-finals
(Armenia) Harut Grigorian	DEC
(France) Karim Benmansour	3-0
(France) Antoine Pinto	DEC
(United States) Zach Bunnell	3-0

Final
(Armenia) Harut Grigorian	DEC
(France) Antoine Pinto	3-0

== Glory 45: Amsterdam ==
Glory 45: Amsterdam
- Promotion: Glory
- Date: September 30, 2017
- Venue: Sporthallen Zuid
- City: Amsterdam, Netherlands

Event chronology
Glory 44: Chicago	Glory 45: Amsterdam	Glory 46: China

Glory 45: Amsterdam was a kickboxing event held on September 30, 2017 at the Sporthallen Zuid in Amsterdam, Netherlands.

=== Background ===
This event features a fight between Robin van Roosmalen and Serhiy Adamchuk for the Glory Featherweight Championship as Glory 45: Amsterdam headliner, and a Welterweight pairing between Nieky Holzken and Yoann Kongolo as co-headliner. Heavyweights Hesdy Gerges and Mladen Brestovac headline the SuperFight Series.

This event also features a 4-Man Light Heavyweight Contender Tournament to earn a shot at the Glory Light Heavyweight Championship.

An injury suffered during training has forced former welterweight champion Nieky Holzken out of the bout against Alim Nabiev.

Bonus awards:

The following fighters will be awarded $5,000 bonuses:

- Fighter of the Night: Michael Duut
- Knockout of the Night: Mladen Brestovac

=== Fight card ===
Glory 45
Weight Class				Method	Round	Time	Notes
Featherweight 65 kg	(Netherlands) Robin van Roosmalen (c)	def.	(Ukraine) Serhiy Adamchuk	Decision (Unanimous)	5	5:00	For the Glory Featherweight Championship
Light Heavyweight 95 kg	(Netherlands) Michael Duut	def.	(United States) Manny Mancha	KO (Punch)	1	0:12	Light Heavyweight Contender Tournament Final
Heavyweight 120 kg	(Croatia) Mladen Brestovac	def.	(Netherlands) Hesdy Gerges	KO (Head Kick)	1	0:36	
Light Heavyweight 95 kg	(United States) Manny Mancha	def.	(Morocco) Imad Hadar	TKO (Arm Injury)	2	1:22	Light Heavyweight Contender Tournament Semi-Finals
Light Heavyweight 95 kg	(Netherlands) Michael Duut	def.	(Moldova) Dragoș Zubco	KO (Punch)	1	0:36	Light Heavyweight Contender Tournament Semi-Finals
Superfight Series
Middleweight 85 kg	(Tunisia) Yousri Belgaroui	def.	(Netherlands) Jason Wilnis	TKO (Doctor Stoppage)	1	2:47	
Featherweight 65 kg	(Netherlands) Zakaria Zouggary	def.	(Netherlands) Massaro Glunder	Decision (Unanimous)	3	3:00	
Lightweight 70	(Morocco) Tyjani Beztati	def.	(Thailand) Yodkhunpon Sitmonchai	Decision (Unanimous)	3	3:00	
Welterweight 77 kg	(Netherlands) Eyevan Danenberg	def.	(Brazil) Wellington Uega	TKO (3 Knockdowns)	2	1:50	
Welterweight 77 kg	(Netherlands) Kevin Hessling	def.	(Bulgaria) Stoyan Koprivlenski	Decision (Unanimous)	3	3:00	

=== 2017 Light Heavyweight Contender Tournament 2 bracket ===
Semi-finals
(Netherlands) Michael Duut	KO
(Moldova) Dragoș Zubco	1r.
(United States) Manny Mancha	TKO
(Morocco) Imad Hadar	2r.

Final
(Netherlands) Michael Duut	KO
(United States) Manny Mancha	1r.

== Road to Glory UK 70 kg Tournament ==
Road to Glory UK 70 kg Tournament
- Promotion: Glory
- Date: October 7, 2017
- Venue: Grantham Meres Leisure Centre
- City: Grantham, England

Event chronology
Glory 45: Amsterdam	Road to Glory UK 70 kg Tournament	Glory 46: China

Road to Glory UK 70 kg Tournament was a kickboxing event held on October 7, 2017 at the Grantham Meres Leisure Centre in Grantham, England.

=== Results ===
Road to Glory UK
Weight Class				Method	Round	Time	Notes
Lightweight 70 kg	(Greece) Giannis Skordilis	def.	(England) Marcel Adeyemi	Decision (Unanimous)	3	3:00	Lightweight Road to Glory Tournament Final
Featherweight 66 kg	(England) Bailey Sugden	def.	(Spain) Jorge Rodríguez Dávila	Decision (Majority)	3	3:00	
Lightweight 70 kg	(Greece) Giannis Skordilis	def.	(Romania) Alex Bublea	TKO	2		Lightweight Road to Glory Tournament Semi-Finals
Lightweight 70 kg	(England) Marcel Adeyemi	def.	(England) Sam Omomogbe	TKO	2		Lightweight Road to Glory Tournament Semi-Finals
Welterweight 77 kg	(England) Reece Rowell	vs.	(England) Adam Hatfield	Draw (Unanimous)	3	3:00	
Welterweight 77 kg	(Poland) Dawid Blaszke	def.	(England) Karl Johnston	TKO	1		
Lightweight 70 kg	(Romania) Alex Bublea	def.	(England) Kyle Todd	Decision (Unanimous)	3	3:00	Lightweight Road to Glory Tournament Quarter-Finals
Lightweight 70 kg	(Greece) Giannis Skordilis	def.	(England) Joe Johnson	TKO (Doctor Stoppage)	2	1:40	Lightweight Road to Glory Tournament Quarter-Finals
Lightweight 70 kg	(England) Sam Omomogbe	def.	(England) John Cairns	Decision (Unanimous)	3	3:00	Lightweight Road to Glory Tournament Quarter-Finals
Lightweight 70 kg	(England) Marcel Adeyemi	def.	(Pakistan) Irtaza Haider	Decision (Unanimous)	3	3:00	Lightweight Road to Glory Tournament Quarter-Finals

== Glory 46: China ==
Glory 46: China
- Promotion: Glory
- Date: October 14, 2017
- Venue: Guangzhou Gymnasium
- City: Guangzhou, China

Event chronology
Glory 45: Amsterdam	Glory 46: China	Glory 47: Lyon

Glory 46: China was a kickboxing event held on October 14, 2017 at the Guangzhou Gymnasium in Guangzhou, China.

=== Background ===
Bonus awards:

The following fighters will be awarded $5,000 bonuses:

- Fighter of the Night: Chenglong Zhang
- Knockout of the Night: Masaya Kubo

=== Fight card ===
Glory 46
Weight Class				Method	Round	Time	Notes
Middleweight 85 kg	(Brazil) Alex Pereira	def.	(Canada) Simon Marcus (c)	Decision (Unanimous)	5	3:00	For the Glory Middleweight Championship
Featherweight 65 kg	(China) Chenglong Zhang	def.	(Japan) Masaya Kubo	Decision (Unanimous)	3	3:00	Featherweight Qualification Tournament Final
Heavyweight 120 kg	(New Zealand) Junior Tafa	def.	(China) Quanchao Luo	TKO (3 Knockdowns)	1	1:34	
Featherweight 65 kg	(China) Chenglong Zhang	def.	(New Zealand) Quade Taranaki	Decision (Unanimous)	3	3:00	Featherweight Qualification Tournament Semi-Finals
Featherweight 65 kg	(Japan) Masaya Kubo	def.	(China) Chenchen Li	KO (Head Kick)	1	2:50	Featherweight Qualification Tournament Semi-Finals
Superfight Series
Heavyweight 120 kg	(Netherlands) Rico Verhoeven	def.	(Brazil) Antônio Silva	TKO (Head Kick and Punches)	2	0:47	
Middleweight 84 kg	(China) Zhou Wei	def.	(United States) Andre Walker	Decision (Unanimous)	3	3:00	
Catchweight 75 kg	(Argentina) Alan Scheinson	def.	(China) Shanghai Gao	Decision (Majority)	3	3:00	
Catchweight 60 kg	(China) Hongxing Kong	def.	(China) Yang Sun	KO (Head Kick)	1	0:36	Professional Sanda
Catchweight 53 kg	(China) Liu Jia	vs.	(Thailand) Zaza Sor. Aree	No Contest (Accidental Elbow)	2	1:10	
Featherweight 65 kg	(Thailand) Petchpanomrung Kiatmookao	def.	(China) Lei Xie	Decision (Unanimous)	3	3:00	
Lightweight 70 kg	(Germany) Pascal Schroth	def.	(China) Qinghao Meng	Decision (Split)	3	3:00	

=== 2017 Featherweight Qualification Tournament bracket ===
Semi-finals
' (China) Chenglong Zhang	DEC
(New Zealand) Quade Taranaki	5-0
(China) Chenchen Li	1r.
(Japan) Masaya Kubo	KO

Final
(China) Chenglong Zhang	DEC
(Japan) Masaya Kubo	3-0

== Glory 47: Lyon ==
Glory 47: Lyon
- Promotion: Glory
- Date: October 28, 2017
- Venue: Palais des Sports de Gerland
- City: Lyon, France

Event chronology
Glory 46: China	Glory 47: Lyon	Glory 48: New York

Glory 47: Lyon was a kickboxing event held on October 28, 2017 at the Palais des Sports de Gerland in Lyon, France.

=== Background ===
Bonus awards:

The following fighters were awarded $5,000 bonuses:

- Fighter of the Night: Abdellah Ezbiri
- Knockout of the Night: Anvar Boynazarov

=== Results ===
Glory 47
Weight Class				Method	Round	Time	Notes
Light Heavyweight 95 kg	(Russia) Artem Vakhitov (c)	def.	(Brazil) Ariel Machado	Decision (Unanimous)	5	3:00	For the Glory Light Heavyweight Championship
Featherweight 65 kg	(France) Abdellah Ezbiri	def.	(Uzbekistan) Anvar Boynazarov	Decision (Unanimous)	3	3:00	Featherweight Contender Tournament Final
Welterweight 77 kg	(France) Cedric Doumbe	def.	(France) Yohan Lidon	Decision (Unanimous)	3	3:00	
Featherweight 65 kg	(France) Abdellah Ezbiri	def.	(Morocco) Azize Hlali	Decision (Unanimous)	3	3:00	Featherweight Contender Tournament Semi-Finals
Featherweight 65 kg	(Uzbekistan) Anvar Boynazarov	def.	(France) Fabio Pinca	KO (Punch)	2	1:50	Featherweight Contender Tournament Semi-Finals
Superfight Series
Featherweight 65 kg	(France) Dylan Salvador	def.	(Netherlands) Massaro Glunder	Decision (Unanimous)	3	3:00	
Light Heavyweight 95 kg	(France) Abdarhmane Coulibaly	def.	(France) Florent Kaouachi	Decision (Split)	3	3:00	
Super Bantamweight 55 kg	(France) Anissa Meksen	def.	(Turkey) Funda Alkayis	TKO (Foot Injury)	3	0:17	Contender Bout
Middleweight 84 kg	(France) Ahaggan Yassine	def.	(Estonia) Maxim Vorovski	Decision (Split)	3	3:00	
Welterweight 77 kg	(Azerbaijan) Alim Nabiev	def.	(France) Jimmy Vienot	Decision (Split)	3	3:00	
Prelims
Lightweight 70 kg	(France) Fares Ziam	vs.	(France) Mohamed Souane	Decision	3	3:00	
Lightweight 70 kg	(France) Mickael Palandre	def.	(France) Yoann Mermoux	Decision	3	3:00	
Light Heavyweight 95 kg	(France) Newfel Ouatah	def.	(France) Mohand Bouzidi	TKO	3		
Featherweight 65 kg	(France) Kamal Aousti	def.	(Italy) Luca Donadio	Decision	3	3:00	

=== 2017 Featherweight Contender Tournament 3 bracket ===
Semi-finals
(France) Fabio Pinca	2r.
(Uzbekistan) Anvar Boynazarov	KO
(Morocco) Aziz Hlali	0-5
(France) Abdellah Ezbiri	DEC

Final
(Uzbekistan) Anvar Boynazarov	0-5
(France) Abdellah Ezbiri	DEC

== Glory 48: New York ==
Glory 48: New York
- Promotion: Glory
- Date: December 1, 2017
- Venue: The Theater at Madison Square Garden
- City: (United States) New York City, New York, US

Event chronology
Glory 47: Lyon	Glory 48: New York	Glory 49: Rotterdam

Glory 48: New York was a kickboxing event held on December 1, 2017 at The Theater at Madison Square Garden in New York City, New York, US.

=== Background ===
Bonus awards:

The following fighters were awarded $5,000 bonuses:

- Fighter of the Night: Robert Thomas
- Knockout of the Night: Kevin Vannostrand

=== Results ===
Glory 48: New York
Weight Class				Method	Round	Time	Notes
Featherweight 66 kg	(United States) Kevin VanNostrand	def.	(Uzbekistan) Anvar Boynazarov	KO (Knee to the Body)	1	1:06	For the Interim Glory Featherweight Championship
Middleweight 85 kg	(Canada) Robert Thomas	def.	(United States) Mike Lemaire	KO (Punch)	3	0:18	Middleweight Qualification Tournament Final
Light Heavyweight 95 kg	(Brazil) Thiago Silva	def.	(United States) John King	Decision (Unanimous)	3	3:00	
Middleweight 85 kg	(Canada) Robert Thomas	def.	(United States) Wayne Barrett	Decision (Unanimous)	3	3:00	Middleweight Qualification Tournament Semi-Finals
Middleweight 85 kg	(United States) Mike Lemaire	def.	(United States) Matt Baker	Decision (Extra Round)	4	3:00	Middleweight Qualification Tournament Semi-Finals
Superfight Series
Women's Super Bantamweight 55 kg	(France) Anissa Meksen	def.	(United States) Tiffany van Soest (c)	Decision (Unanimous)	5	3:00	For the Glory Women's Super Bantamweight Championship
Middleweight 84 kg	(United States) Chris Camozzi	def.	(United States) Kyle Weickhardt	TKO (Corner Stoppage)	2	3:00	
Lightweight 70 kg	(Kosovo) Elvis Gashi	def.	(United States) Nate Richardson	Decision (Unanimous)	3	3:00	
Middleweight 84 kg	(Chile) Ivan Galaz	def.	(United States) Paul Banasiak	Decision (Majority)	3	3:00	
Lightweight 70 kg	(Israel) Itay Gershon	def.	(United States) Justin Houghton	Decision (Unanimous)	3	3:00	

=== 2017 Middleweight Qualification Tournament bracket ===
Semi-finals
(United States) Mike Lemaire	DEC
(United States) Matt Baker	3-0
(United States) Wayne Barrett	0-3
(Canada) Robert Thomas	DEC

Final
(United States) Mike Lemaire	3r.
(Canada) Robert Thomas	KO

== Glory 49: Rotterdam ==
Glory 49: Rotterdam
- Promotion: Glory
- Date: December 9, 2017
- Venue: Rotterdam Ahoy
- City: Rotterdam, Netherlands

Event chronology
Glory 48: New York	Glory 49: Rotterdam	Glory 50: Chicago

Glory 49: Rotterdam was a kickboxing event held on December 9, 2017 at Rotterdam Ahoy in Rotterdam, Netherlands.

=== Background ===
Bonus awards:

The following fighters will be awarded $5,000 bonuses:

- Fighter of the Night:
- Knockout of the Night:

=== Results ===
Glory Redemption
Weight Class				Method	Round	Time	Notes
Heavyweight 120 kg	(Netherlands) Rico Verhoeven (c)	def.	(Morocco) Jamal Ben Saddik	KO (Punches)	5	1:10	For the Glory Heavyweight Championship
Light Heavyweight 95 kg	(Democratic Republic of the Congo) Danyo Ilunga	def.	(Netherlands) Michael Duut	KO (Punch)	3	2:26	
Featherweight 66 kg	(England) Bailey Sugden	def.	(China) Zhang Chenglong	Decision (Unanimous)	3	3:00	
Featherweight 66 kg	(Thailand) Petchpanomrung Kiatmookao	def.	(Netherlands) Zakaria Zouggary	KO (Head Kick)	3	2:10	Contender Bout
Superfight Series
Middleweight 85 kg	(Brazil) Alex Pereira (c)	def.	(Tunisia) Yousri Belgaroui	TKO (Doctor Stoppage)	3	1:54	For the Glory Middleweight Championship
Welterweight 77 kg	(Azerbaijan) Alim Nabiev	def.	(Netherlands) Nieky Holzken	Decision (Unanimous)	3	3:00	
Heavyweight 120 kg	(Curaçao) D'Angelo Marshall	def.	(Suriname) Ismael Londt	Decision (Unanimous)	3	3:00	
Heavyweight 120 kg	(Brazil) Anderson Silva	def.	(Netherlands) Brian Douwes	Decision (Unanimous)	3	3:00	
Welterweight 77 kg	(Netherlands) Eyevan Danenberg	def.	(England) Jamie Bates	Decision (Unanimous)	3	3:00	
Glory 49: Rotterdam
Lightweight 70 kg	(Bulgaria) Stoyan Koprivlenski	def.	(Morocco) Tyjani Beztati	Decision (Unanimous)	3	3:00	Lightweight Contender Tournament Final
Lightweight 70 kg	(Angola) Christian Baya	def.	(Slovenia) Samo Petje	KO (Punch To the body)	1	1:26	
Welterweight 77 kg	(United States) Omar Moreno	def.	(China) Anying Wang	Decision (Unanimous)	3	3:00	
Lightweight 70 kg	(Bulgaria) Stoyan Koprivlenski	def.	(Brazil) Maykol Yurk	KO (Head Kick)	1	2:47	Lightweight Contender Tournament Semi-Finals
Lightweight 70 kg	(Morocco) Tyjani Beztati	def.	(Denmark) Niclas Larsen	Decision (Unanimous)	3	3:00	Lightweight Contender Tournament Semi-Finals

=== 2017 Glory Lightweight Contender Tournament 2 bracket ===
Semi-finals
(Morocco) Tyjani Beztati	DEC
(Denmark) Niclas Larsen	5-0
(Bulgaria) Stoyan Koprivlenski	KO
(Brazil) Maykol Yurk	1r.

Final
(Morocco) Tyjani Beztati	5-0
(Bulgaria) Stoyan Koprivlenski	DEC

== See also ==
- 2017 in Kunlun Fight
- 2017 in Glory of Heroes
- 2017 in Wu Lin Feng
