= Serhii Kuliaba =

Ukrainian kickboxer (born 1991)

- Born: 31 October 1991 (age 34); Odesa, Ukraine
- Native name: Сергій Куляба
- Other names: Sergey Kulyaba
- Nationality: Ukrainian
- Height: 1.76 m (5 ft 9 in)
- Weight: 66 kg (146 lb; 10.4 st)
- Division: Featherweight; Lightweight
- Style: Kickboxing, Muay Thai
- Years active: 2012 - present

Kickboxing record
- Total: 39
- Wins: 20
- By knockout: 5
- Losses: 17
- By knockout: 2
- Draws: 2
- Last updated on: 28 December 2018

Serhii Kuliaba (Ukrainian: Сергій Куляба, born 31 October 1991) is a Ukrainian kickboxer. He is the winner of the 2018 Kunlun Fight 66 kg tournament.

As of 17 October 2017, he was ranked the #8 lightweight in the world by Liverkick.

== Martial arts career ==
Kulyaba made his professional debut in December 2012, against Aleksei Ulianov, winning by decision. In the following three years, he went on a 8-3-2 run, achieving a notable victory over Bobo Sacko and a draw with Sak Kaoponlek. His first career title came in 2015, when he won the 2015 four man Partouche Kickboxing Tour tournament, knocking out Samir Mohamed and Bertrand Lambert.

Kulyaba then entered the worst run of form in his career up to that point, losing three fights in a row to Kem Sitsongpeenong, Jomthong Chuwattana and Chris Ngimbi. Following these losses, he participated in the 2016 Super Muaythai four man tournament, defeating Zhang Hu by TKO in the semifinals and Sanpet by decision in the final. Kulyaba won four of his next five fights, including an extra round decision win against Andrei Kulebin, before fighting the highest profile bout of his career, taking on Buakaw Banchamek at All Star Fight 2. He was unable to overcome the Thai legend, as Buakaw won a decision.

Despite the poor run of form following this fight, during which Kulyaba lost four of his five fights, Kulyaba was nonetheless given a chance to fight in the 2018 Kunlun Fight 66 kg Tournament. He defeated Jia Aoqi in the quarterfinal, Sun Zhixiang in the semifinal and Gu Hui in the final bout to take the tournament title.

Kulyaba fought just once in 2019, a failed title bid for Eddy Nait Slimani's La Nuit des Champions 66 kg title, as Slimani won the fight by split decision.

== Achievements and accomplishments ==
=== Professional ===
Muay Thai

- 2016 Super Muaythai 4-Man Tournament Winner

Kickboxing

- Partouche Kickboxing
  - 2015 Partouche Kickboxing Tour 4-Man Tournament Winner
- Kunlun Fight
  - 2018 Kunlun Fight -66 kg World Tournament Champion

=== Amateur ===
- International Federation of Muaythai Associations
  - 2016 IFMA World Cup -67 kg (gold)
  - 2014 IFMA European Championships -67 kg (bronze)
  - 2013 IFMA European Championships -67 kg (gold)
  - 2011 IFMA European Championships -67 kg (silver)
  - 2010 IFMA World Championships -63.5 kg (silver)
  - 2010 IFMA European Championships -63.5 kg (bronze)
- World Combat Games
  - 2017 World Combat Games Muay Thai -67 kg (gold)
  - 2013 World Combat Games Muay Thai -67 kg (silver)

=== Awards ===
- Ukraine's Best Muay Thai Athlete 2017

== Fight record ==
Professional Kickboxing Record
20 Wins (5 (T)KO), 17 Losses, 2 Draw
Date	Result	Opponent	Event	Location	Method	Round	Time
2023-07-29	Loss	(Thailand) Yodkhunpon Sitmonchai	Rajadamnern World Series - Group Stage	Bangkok, Thailand	Decision (Unanimous)	3	3:00
2023-06-24	Loss	(Thailand) Yodkompatak Sinbimuaythai	Rajadamnern World Series - Group Stage	Bangkok, Thailand	Decision (Unanimous)	3	3:00
2023-05-20	Loss	(Thailand) Rittewada Petchyindee Academy	Rajadamnern World Series - Group Stage	Bangkok, Thailand	TKO (Doctor stoppage/cut)	2	2:39
2019-11-16	Loss	(France) Eddy Nait Slimani	La Nuit Des Champions	France	Decision (Split)	5	3:00
For La Nuit des Champions -66kg title.
2018-12-15	Win	(China) Gu Hui	Kunlun Fight 79 – 66 kg Tournament, Final	China	Decision (Unanimous)	3	3:00
Wins the Kunlun Fight -66kg Tournament World title.
2018-12-15	Win	(China) Sun Zhixiang	Kunlun Fight 79 – 66 kg Tournament, Semi Finals	China	Decision (Unanimous)	3	3:00
2018-12-15	Win	(China) Jia Aoqi	Kunlun Fight 79 – 66 kg Tournament, Quarter Finals	China	Decision (Unanimous)	3	3:00
2018-08-05	Loss	(Morocco) Nordin Ben Moh	Kunlun Fight 75	China	Decision	3	3:00
2018-04-28	Loss	(Thailand) Petchtanong Banchamek	All Star Fight 3	Thailand	Decision (Unanimous)	3	3:00
2018-02-04	Loss	(Thailand) Superbon Banchamek	Kunlun Fight 69 – 70 kg Tournament, Semi Finals	China	Decision (Majority)	3	3:00
2017-11-24	Loss	(Georgia (country)) Davit Kiria	2017 Kungfu World Cup -70 kg Semi-Finals	Paris, France	Decision (unanimous)	3	3:00
2017-11-12	Win	(Serbia) Nikola Cimesa	Kunlun Fight 67 – 70 kg Tournament, Quarter Finals	China	Decision (Unanimous)	3	3:00
2017-09-30	Loss	(Thailand) Buakaw Banchamek	All Star Fight 2	Thailand	Decision (Unanimous)	3	3:00
2017-08-27	Win	(Belarus) Andrei Kulebin	Kunlun Fight 65 World MAX Tournament Final 16	Qingdao, China	Ext.R Decision (2-3)	4	3:00
2017-06-10	Win	(Australia) Victor Nagbe	Kunlun Fight 62	China	Decision (Unanimous)	3	3:00
2017-06-10	Win	(China) Tian Xin	Kunlun Fight 62	China	Decision (Unanimous)	3	3:00
2017-04-08	Win	(Thailand) Sebmune	Super Muaythai	Thailand	KO	2	
2017-01-01	Loss	(China) Gu Hui	Kunlun Fight 56	China	Decision (Unanimous)	3	3:00
2016-12-03	Win	(Thailand) Sanpet	Super Muaythai	Thailand	Decision	3	3:00
Wins the Super Muaythai 4-Man Tournament.
2016-12-03	Win	(China) Zhang Hu	Super Muaythai	Thailand	TKO	1	
2016-03-25	Loss	(Democratic Republic of the Congo) Chris Ngimbi	Kunlun Fight 40	China	KO	3	
2015-12-05	Loss	(Thailand) Jomthong Chuwattana	Super Muay Thai	Bangkok, Thailand	Decision (Unanimous)	3	3:00
2015-10-17	Loss	(Thailand) Kem Sitsongpeenong	Top King World Series 7 Final 8	China	Decision	3	3:00
2015-09-04	Win	(Japan) Tomoyuki Nishikawa	Top King World Series	Thailand	Decision	3	3:00
2015-07-31	Win	(France) Bertrand Lambert	Partouche Kickboxing Tour	France	TKO	3	
Wins the PKT 4-Man Tournament.
2015-07-31	Win	(France) Samir Mohamed	Partouche Kickboxing Tour	France	TKO (Injury)	2	
2015-04-29	Win	(Romania) Claudiu Badoi	Tatneft Cup 2015 - 1st Selection 1/4 Finals	Russia	Decision	3	3:00
2015-03-31	Win	(Belarus) Apti Bimarzaev	Tatneft Cup 2015	Russia	Decision	3	3:00
2014-12-07	Draw	(Thailand) Superchamp Rajanon	Max Muay Thai Final Chapter	Thailand	Decision	3	3:00
2014-10-11	Loss	(Belarus) Dmitry Varats	W5 Grand Prix	Russia	Decision	3	3:00
2014-05-22	Loss	(Russia) Artem Pashporin	Grand Prix Russia Open	Russia	Decision (Unanimous)	3	3:00
2014-04-05	Draw	(Thailand) Sak Kaoponlek	Oktagon	Milan, Italy	Decision	3	3:00
2014-03-01	Win	(Belarus) Arthur Isayants	W5 Grand Prix Orel XXIV	Russia	Decision	4	3:00
2013-11-16	Win	(Russia) Vasiliy Goral	W5 Grand Prix Orel	Russia	Decision	3	3:00
2013-11-10	Win	(France) Bobo Sacko	Warriors Night	France	KO	2	
2013-04-24	Win	(Belarus) Dmitry Varats	W5 Grand Prix Orel XXI	Russia	Decision	3	3:00
2012-06-02	Loss	(Estonia) Erik Edvin Kibus	Tatneft Cup	Russia	Decision	3	3:00
2012-02-24	Win	(Russia) Alexei Dodonov	Tatneft Cup - 1/8 Finals	Russia	Decision	3	3:00
2012-12-08	Win	(Russia) Aleksei Ulianov		Russia	Decision	3	3:00
2010-05-08	Loss	(Kyrgyzstan) Rafael Fiziev		Mytishchi, Russia	Decision	3	3:00
For the WMF Intercontinental Light Welterweight title.
Legend: Win Loss Draw/No contest Notes

Amateur Muay Thai Record
Date	Result	Opponent	Event	Location	Method	Round	Time
2019-07-26	Loss	(Turkey) Erdem Dincer	I.F.M.A. World Championships 2019, Quarter Finals, -67 kg	Bangkok, Thailand	Decision (30:27)	3	2:00
2019-07-24	Win	(Slovakia) Marco Novak	I.F.M.A. World Championships 2019, Round of 16, -67 kg	Bangkok, Thailand	Decision (30:27)	3	2:00
2019-07-22	Win	(Australia) Rhyse Saliba	I.F.M.A. World Championships 2019, Round of 32, -67 kg	Bangkok, Thailand	Decision (29:28)	3	2:00
2018-05-14	Loss	(Hungary) Spéth Norbert Attila	I.F.M.A. World Championships 2018, Quarter Finals -67 kg	Cancún, Mexico	Decision (30:27)	3	2:00
2018-05-12	Win	(Mexico) Ricardo Cruz	I.F.M.A. World Championships 2018, Eighth Finals -67 kg	Cancún, Mexico	Decision (30:27)	3	2:00
2017-07-30	Win	(Russia) Vladimir Kuzmin	I.F.M.A. World Muaythai at The World Games 2017, Final	Wrocław, Poland	Decision (29:28)	3	3:00
Wins 2017 World Games Muay Thai -67kg Gold Medal.
2017-07-29	Win	(Thailand) Anueng Khatthamarasri	I.F.M.A. World Muaythai at The World Games 2017, Semi Finals	Wrocław, Poland	Decision (29:28)	3	3:00
2017-07-28	Win	(Iraq) Akram Al-Qaysi	I.F.M.A. World Muaythai at The World Games 2017, Quarter Finals	Wrocław, Poland	RSC	1	
2016-11-26	Win	(Russia) Aleksei Ulianov	IFMA World Cup 2016 in Kazan, Final	Kazan, Russia	Decision	3	3:00
Wins 2016 IFMA World Cup in Kazan -67kg Gold Medal.
2016-11-23	Win	(Turkmenistan) Mustafa Saparmyradov	IFMA World Cup 2016 in Kazan, Semi Final	Kazan, Russia	Decision	3	3:00
2016-11-22	Win	(Thailand) Weerayut Chuaisaeng	IFMA World Cup 2016 in Kazan, Quarter Finals	Kazan, Russia	Decision	3	3:00
2016-05-24	Loss	(Turkey) Ali Batmaz	I.F.M.A. World Championships 2016, Quarter Finals -67 kg	Jönköping, Sweden	Decision (29:28)	3	2:00
2016-05-21	Win	(Peru) Victor Canto	I.F.M.A. World Championships 2016, Eighth Finals -67 kg	Jönköping, Sweden	Decision (30:27)	3	2:00
2015-08-14	Loss	(Thailand) Fueangfu Piya	I.F.M.A. Royal World cup Tournament 2015, Quarter Finals -67 kg	Bangkok, Thailand	Decision	3	2:00
2015-08-14	Win	(Hungary) Péter Albrecht	I.F.M.A. Royal World cup Tournament 2015, Eighth Finals -67 kg	Bangkok, Thailand	TKO	2	
2015-03-	Win	(Turkey) Dogan Emre Bildirci	2015 IFMA-FISU Muaythai University World Cup, Final	Bangkok, Thailand	Decision	3	3:00
Wins 2015 IFMA-FISU Muaythai University World Cup -67kg Gold Medal.
2014-09-	Loss	(Belarus) Andrei Kulebin	2014 IFMA European Championships, Semi Finals	Kraków, Poland	Decision	3	3:00
Wins 2014 IFMA European Championships -67kg Bronze Medal.
2014-09-	Win	(Austria) Martin Gromkiewicz	2014 IFMA European Championships, Quarter Finals	Kraków, Poland	Decision	3	3:00
2014-05-	Loss	(Thailand) Somwang Sittisak	2014 IFMA World Championships, 1/8 Finals	Langkawi, Malaysia	Decision	3	3:00
2013-10-23	Loss	(Belarus) Andrei Kulebin	SportAccord World Combat Games, Final	Saint Petersburg, Russia	Decision	3	3:00
Wins 2013 World Combat Games Muay Thai -67kg Silver Medal.
2013-10-21	Win	(Thailand) Supachai Pansuvan	SportAccord World Combat Games, Semi Final	Saint Petersburg, Russia	Decision	3	3:00
2013-07-	Win	(Belarus) Andrei Kulebin	2013 IFMA European Championship, Final	Lisbon, Portugal	Decision	4	2:00
Wins 2013 IFMA European Championships -67kg Gold Medal.
2013-07-27	Win	(Russia) Khayal Dzhaniev	2013 IFMA European Championship, Semi Finals	Lisbon, Portugal	Decision	4	2:00
2012-05-	Win	(Russia) Aleksei Ulianov	2012 IFMA European Championship, Semi Finals	Antalya, Turkey	Doctor stoppage	1	
2011-09-23	Loss	(Thailand) Jeerasak Inudom	2011 IFMA World Championships, Quarter Finals	Tashkent, Uzbekistan	Decision	4	2:00
2011-09-21	Win	(Bulgaria) Kirilov Veselinov	2011 IFMA World Championships	Tashkent, Uzbekistan	Decision	4	2:00
2011-04-28	Loss	(Belarus) Andrei Kulebin	I.F.M.A. European Muaythai Championships '11, Semi Finals -67 kg	Antalya, Turkey			
Wins 2011 IFMA European Championships -67kg Bronze Medal.
2010-12-	Loss	(Thailand) Panupan Tunjud	2010 I.F.M.A. World Muaythai Championships, Finals	Bangkok, Thailand	Decision	4	2:00
Wins 2010 IFMA World Championships -63.5kg Silver Medal.
2010-12-	Win		2010 I.F.M.A. World Muaythai Championships, Semi Finals	Bangkok, Thailand			
2010-05-	Loss	(Russia) Abdulsalam Zaire	2010 I.F.M.A. European Muaythai Championships, Semi Finals	Italy	Decision	4	2:00
Wins 2010 IFMA European Championships -63.5kg Bronze Medal.
Legend: Win Loss Draw/No contest Notes

== See also ==
- List of male kickboxers
