= Massaro Glunder =

Dutch-Moluccan professional kickboxer (born 1994)

Massaro Glunder-Timisela
- Born: Massaro Glunder; August 15, 1994 (age 32); Amsterdam, Netherlands
- Nationality: Dutch
- Height: 1.75 m (5 ft 9 in)
- Weight: 65.0 kg (143.3 lb; 10.24 st)
- Division: Featherweight
- Style: Kickboxing
- Fighting out of: Oostzaan, Netherlands
- Team: Mike's Gym
- Trainer: Mike Passenier; Rodney Glunder
- Years active: 2012 - present

Kickboxing record
- Total: 51
- Wins: 31
- By knockout: 20
- Losses: 16
- By knockout: 1
- Draws: 4

Other information
- Notable relatives: Rodney Glunder (father)
- Boxing record from BoxRec

Massaro Glunder-Timisela is a Dutch-Moluccan professional kickboxer. He is a former W5 72.5 kg Intercontinental champion.

Glunder was ranked in the Featherweight top ten by Combat Press from October 2015 until May 2016.

== Kickboxing career ==
Massaro won the W5 72.5 kg Intercontinental Championship in 2015, with a unanimous decision win over Foad Sadeghi.

Glunder fought Kaew Fairtex for the K-1 65 kg title. Fairtex won the fight by a split decision.

Glunder was scheduled to fight Victor Pinto during Glory 51. He won the fight by a unanimous decision.

He fought with K-1 in 2018, when he fought Yasuhiro Kido. He lost the fight in the third round by DQ, as the referee judged Glunder spent too much holding Kido in the clinch. He lost his next fight against Aleksei Ulianov by decision as well.

He was then scheduled to fight Quade Taranaki during Glory 56. Glunder won the fight by a unanimous decision.

Glunder's next fight was a Super Fight Series headliner against Kevin VanNostrand. Glunder lost the fight by a unanimous decision, after he was deducted a point for clinching.

Following these two losses, he was scheduled to fight Luke Whelan. Whelan was later replaced by Arbi Emiev. Glunder won the fight by a unanimous decision.

Glunder next faced Mohammed Jaraya during Glory's Collision 2 event. He lost the fight by a unanimous decision.

He was next set to face Jos van Belzen during Glory 76. The fight was later cancelled due to the COVID-19 pandemic.

== Titles and accomplishments ==
- 2015 W5 72.5 kg Intercontinental Championship.
- 2013 KOK 65 kg World CUP/ HERO‘S 2013 Tournament Champion.

== Kickboxing record ==
Kickboxing record
31 wins (20 (T)KOs), 16 losses, 4 draws
Date	Result	Opponent	Event	Location	Method	Round	Time
2023-11-14	Loss	(Japan) Kaito	SHOOT BOXING 2023 Series Final	Tokyo, Japan	KO (knee)	1	2:48
2019-12-21	Loss	(Morocco) Mohammed Jaraya	Glory Collision 2	Arnhem, Netherlands	Decision (unanimous)	3	3:00
2019-10-12	Win	(Russia) Arbi Emiev	Glory 69: Dusseldorf	Dusseldorf, Germany	Decision (unanimous)	3	3:00
2019-03-09	Loss	(Russia) Aleksei Ulianov	Glory 64: Strasbourg	Strasbourg, France	Decision (unanimous)	3	3:00
2018-11-02	Loss	(United States) Kevin VanNostrand	Glory 61: New York	New York, United States	Decision	3	3:00
2018-08-10	Win	(New Zealand) Quade Taranaki	Glory 56: Denver	Colorado	Decision (unanimous)	3	3:00
2018-06-17	Loss	(Japan) Yasuhiro Kido	K-1 World GP 2018: 2nd Featherweight Championship Tournament	Saitama, Japan	Disqualification	3	3:00
2018-03-03	Win	(France) Victor Pinto	Glory 51: Rotterdam	Rotterdam, Netherlands	Decision (unanimous)	3	3:00
2017-10-28	Loss	(France) Dylan Salvador	Glory 47: Lyon	Lyon, France	Decision (unanimous)	3	3:00
2017-09-30	Loss	(Netherlands) Zakaria Zouggary	Glory 45: Amsterdam	Amsterdam, Netherlands	Decision (unanimous)	3	3:00
2017-06-10	Loss	(Angola) Christian Baya	Glory 42: Paris	Paris, France	Decision (split)	3	3:00
2017-06-10	Win	(Denmark) Niclas Larsen	Glory 42: Paris	Paris, France	TKO (2 knockdowns)	1	2:18
2017-05-06	Loss	(China) Wang Pengfei	Wu Lin Feng	Zhengzhou, China	Decision (unanimous)	3	3:00
2017-04-08	Loss	(Russia) Vlad Tuinov	W5 Dubrovnik ‘The Undefeated’	Dubrovnik, Croatia	Decision	3	3:00
2016-12-10	Win	(China) Zhang Chunyu	Kunlun Fight 55	China	Extra round decision (unanimous)	4	3:00
2016-07-30	Loss	(Korea) Kim Minsoo	Kunlun Fight 48 - 65 kg 2016 Tournament 1/8 Finals	Jining, China	Decision	3	3:00
2016-06-24	Loss	(Japan) Masaaki Noiri	K-1 World GP 2016 -65kg World Tournament, Quarter Finals	Tokyo, Japan	Decision (unanimous)	3	3:00
2016-05-21	Win	(Austria) Foad Sadeghi	It's W5 Time XXXIII	Austria	Decision	5	3:00
2016-05-07	Win	(China) Yang Zhuo	WLF Glory of Heroes 2	Shenzhen, China	Decision	3	3:00
2016-04-03	Loss	(Netherlands) Mohammed El Messaoudi	World Fighting League	Netherlands	Decision	3	3:00
2016-03-04	Loss	(Thailand) Kaew Fairtex	K-1 World GP 2016 -65kg Japan Tournament	Tokyo, Japan	Decision (split)	3	3:00
Fight Was For K-1 -65kg Championship.
2015-12-05	Win	(Austria) Foad Sadeghi	W5 GRAND PRIX VIENNA XXXI	Vienna, Austria	Decision (unanimous)	3	3:00
Won W5 72.5KG Intercontinental Championship.
2015-11-21	Win	(Japan) Ren Hiramoto	K-1 World GP 2015 The Championship	Tokyo, Japan	Decision (majority)	3	3:00
2015-10-18	Loss	(Suriname) Cedric Manhoef	WFL "Unfinished Business", 70 kg 4 Man Tournament Final	Hoofddorp, Netherlands	Decision	3	3:00
Fight Was For WFL 70kg Tournament Champion.
2015-10-18	Win	(Netherlands) William Diender	WFL "Unfinished Business", 70 kg 4 Man Tournament Semi Finals	Hoofddorp, Netherlands	Decision	3	3:00
2015-10-10	Loss	(Thailand) Saenchai PKSaenchaimuaythaigym	Yokkao 15	England	Decision (unanimous)	5	3:00
2015-07-04	Loss	(Brazil) Minoru Kimura	K-1 World GP 2015 -70kg Championship Tournament	Tokyo, Japan	Extension round decision (unanimous)	4	3:00
2015-05-24	Loss	(Morocco) Hamza Essalih	Enfusion Kickboxing Talents	Amsterdam, Netherlands	Ext.R Decision	4	3:00
2015-04-19	Win	(Japan) Masaaki Noiri	K-1 World GP 2015 -55kg Championship Tournament	Tokyo, Japan	TKO (doctor stoppage)	2	0:40
2015-03-28	Win	(Romania) Alex Ciolac	Ronin	United Kingdom	KO (Right High Knee)	3	1:20
2013-11-16	Win	(Lithuania) Martynas Danius	KOK World CUP/ HERO‘S 2013 65 kg Tournament Final	Vilnius, Lithuania	KO (left high kick)	2	2:45
Won KOK 65KG World CUP/ HERO‘S 2013 Tournament.
2013-11-16	Win	(Lithuania) Deividas Danyla	KOK World CUP/ HERO‘S 2013 65 kg Tournament Semi Final	Vilnius, Lithuania	KO (knee)	1	2:55
2013-10-10	Win	(Netherlands) Kevin Hessling	Fight Fans VI	Netherlands	KO (right high kick)	2	2:00
2013-05-04	Win	(Armenia) Araik Sargsian	Ultimate Takedown 5	Netherlands	Decision (unanimous)	5	2:00
2012-11-24	Draw	(Netherlands) Romar Quandt	2 the MAXX	Netherlands	Decision	3	2:00
2012-09-02	Win	(Netherlands) Ahmed Fadil	Muaythai Mania V	The Hague, Netherlands	KO		
2011-06-06	Draw	(Morocco) Ishak Ouaali	Push It 2 The Limit	Amsterdam	Decision	3	2:00
Legend: Win Loss Draw/no contest Notes

== Mixed martial arts record ==
Professional record breakdown
3 matches	0 wins	3 losses
By submission	0	3

Res.	Record	Opponent	Method	Event	Date	Round	Time	Location	Notes
Loss	0-3	Silvis Jansons	Submission (kimura)	Levels Fight League 6	2 October 2022	2	1:48	Amsterdam, Netherlands	
Loss	0-2	Alfrego Ruelas	Submission (rear naked choke)	Combate Global Exclusivo	9 September 2022	1	1:28	Miami, Florida, USA	
Loss	0-1	Andy Souwer	Submission (armbar)	World Fighting League MMA	27 May 2017	3		Almere, Netherlands	

== See also ==
- List of male kickboxers
- List of Moluccan people
