= Yannick Reine =

French kickboxer (born 1987)

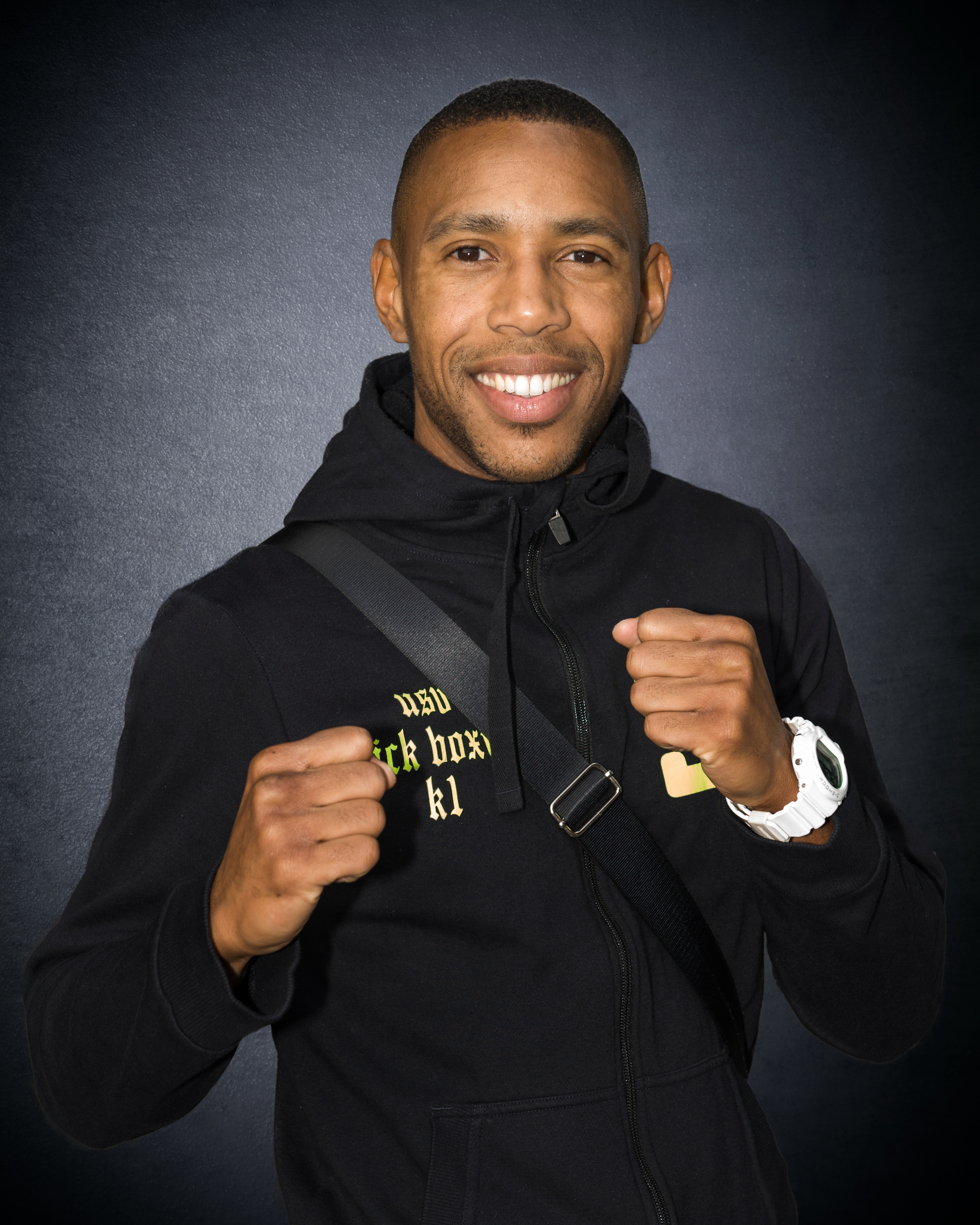
- Reine in 2015
- Born: 12 June 1987 (age 39); Villejuif, France
- Nationality: (France) French
- Height: 1.72 m (5 ft 7 1/2 in)
- Weight: 63.5 kg (140 lb; 10.00 st)
- Division: Super Bantamweight
- Style: Kickboxing, Muay Thai
- Stance: Southpaw
- Fighting out of: Villejuif, France
- Team: Académie des Boxes de Villejuif
- Trainer: Pascal Arène, Laurent Lutz, Sidi Koné

Kickboxing record
- Total: 59
- Wins: 53
- By knockout: 10
- Losses: 6

Yannick Reine (born 12 June 1987) is a French kickboxer. He is a WKN World Lightweight kickboxing champion, and the current ISKA World K-1 Super Lightweight champion.

Combat Press ranked him in the Bantamweight top ten between May and July 2019.

== Martial arts career ==
In April 2016, Yannick fought Lorenzo Piras for the WKN European Muaythai Lightweight title. He beat Piras by decision.

In December 2016, Reine fought Soufiane Hammani for the ISKA World K-1 Super Lightweight title. Reine won the fight by unanimous decision.

Yannick participated in the 2017 Konateam Tournament. He beat Sofiane Bougossa by decision in the semifinals, and Youssouf Binate by an extra round decision in the finals, to win the tournament.

He defended his ISKA K-1 title for the first time during Capital Fights 2, when he was scheduled to fight Eddy Nait Slimani. He defeated Slimani by unanimous decision.

Reine fought with K-1 for the first time during Krush 80, when he faced Koya Urabe. Urabe snapped Reine's nine fight winning streak with a unanimous decision win.

Reine had his second ISKA title defense in June 2018, when he fought Arthur Siong. Yannick won the fight by decision.

Reine defended his ISKA title for the third time during Noia Fighters 3, when he fought Unai Caro. He beat Caro by decision.

In March 2020, Reine was scheduled to fight Kim Woo Seung for the WKN World Kickboxing title. He won the fight by a third-round TKO, as Seung suffered a leg injury.

== Titles and achievements ==
- 2012 Elite Kickboxing France Champion
- 2013 Elite Kickboxing France Champion
- 2013 K-1 France Champion
- 2014 Elite Kickboxing France Champion
- 2016 WKN Muaythai Europe -62 kg Champion
- 2016 ISKA K-1 World -63.5 kg Champion (Three title defenses)
- 2020 WKN World Kickboxing Lightweight champion

== Kickboxing record ==
Kickboxing record
53 Wins (10 (T)KO's), 6 Losses, 0 Draws
| Date | Result | Opponent | Event | Location | Method | Round | Time |
| 2020-03-07 | Win | (Korea) Kim Woo Seung | Villejuif Boxing Show 2 | France | TKO (Leg injury) | 3 | |
Wins WKN World 64.5kg title
| 2019-04-20 | Win | (Spain) Unai Caro | Noia Fighters 3 | Spain | Decision | 5 | 3:00 |
Defends ISKA K-1 World 63.5kg title
| 2019-03-15 | Win | (France) Tristan Benard | Villejuif Boxing Show | France | Decision | 3 | 3:00 |
| 2019-01-19 | Win | (Spain) Daniel Puertas Gallardo | Nuit Des Gladiateurs 10 | France | Decision | 3 | 3:00 |
| 2018-06-02 | Win | (France) Arthur Siong | La Nuit Du Kick Boxing III | France | Decision | 5 | 3:00 |
Defends ISKA K-1 World 63.5kg title
| 2017-09-08 | Loss | (Japan) Koya Urabe | Krush 80 | Tokyo, Japan | Decision | 3 | 3:00 |
| 2017-06-27 | Win | (France) Vang Moua | Triumph Fighting Tour | France | TKO (Knees and punches) | 2 | |
| 2017-05-20 | Win | (France) Eddy Nait Slimani | Capital Fights 2 | France | Decision | 5 | 3:00 |
Defends ISKA K-1 World 63.5kg title
| 2017-04-01 | Win | (France) Youssouf Binate | Konateam Tournament, Final | France | Extra Round Decision | 4 | 3:00 |
Wins 2017 Konateam Tournament 63.5kg title
| 2017-04-01 | Win | (France) Sofiane Bougossa | Konateam Tournament, Semi Final | France | Decision | 3 | 3:00 |
| 2016-12-10 | Win | (Belgium) Soufiane Hammani | Championnat du Monde ISKA | France | Decision | 5 | 3:00 |
Wins ISKA K-1 World 63.5kg title
| 2016-05-28 | Win | (France) Mikael Peynaud | Cavalaire Kickboxing Show | France | Decision | 3 | 3:00 |
| 2016-04-23 | Win | (Italy) Lorenzo Piras | The Night of Super Fight 5 | Italy | Decision | 5 | 3:00 |
Wins WKN Muay Thai Europe 62kg title
| 2016-04-09 | Win | (France) Gagny Baradji | Partouche Kickboxing Tour | France | Decision | 3 | 3:00 |
| 2016-01-16 | Win | (France) Mustapha Benshimed | Muaythaiattitude IV | France | Decision | 3 | 3:00 |
| 2015-06-12 | Loss | (France) Alexy Wallace | Strike Fight | France | KO (Spinning back elbow) | 2 | 3:00 |
| 2015-04-18 | Win | (France) Rafi Bohic | Konateam Tournament, Final | France | Decision | 3 | 3:00 |
Wins 2015 Konateam Tournament 63.5kg title
| 2015-04-18 | Win | (France) Sofiane Bougossa | Konateam Tournament, Semi Final | France | Decision | 3 | 3:00 |
| 2014-10-23 | Loss | (France) Houcine Bennoui | A1 WCC Lyon, Semi Finals | Lyon, France | Decision | 3 | 3:00 |
| 2014-05-31 | Win | (France) David Douge | FK ONE | Lyon, France | TKO | 1 | |
| 2014-03-29 | Win | (France) Christopher Delmotte | Finales Elites De Kick-Boxing | France | TKO | 3 | |
Wins 2014 Elite Kickboxing France title
| 2014-01-25 | Win | (France) Mikael Peynaud | La Ligue des Gladiateurs | France | Decision | 3 | 3:00 |
| 2013-06-29 | Win | (France) Suliman Vazeilles | Finale Championnat de France Elite de K1 Rules | France | TKO | 2 | |
Wins 2013 K-1 France title
| 2013-04-20 | Win | (France) Bertrand Lambert | FK-ONE | France | Decision | 3 | 3:00 |
Wins 2013 Elite Kickboxing France title
| 2012-03-31 | Win | (France) Gaetan Olivier | 6e Trophée des Etoiles | France | Decision | 3 | 3:00 |
Wins 2012 Elite Kickboxing France title
| 2011-11-26 | Win | (France) Dada Shezam | La Nuit du Kick Boxing | France | KO | 1 | |
Legend: Win Loss Draw/No contest Notes

== See also ==
- List of male kickboxers
