= Daniel Puertas Gallardo =

Spanish kickboxer

- Born: 1 December 1992 (age 33); Málaga, Spain
- Other names: Dekkers
- Height: 1.72 m (5 ft 7 1/2 in)
- Weight: 61 kg (134 lb; 9.6 st)
- Reach: 69.6 in (177 cm)
- Style: Kickboxing
- Stance: Orthodox
- Fighting out of: Mijas, Spain
- Team: Ultimátum Fight School
- Trainer: Fernando Jiménez

Kickboxing record
- Total: 46
- Wins: 33
- By knockout: 13
- Losses: 13
- By knockout: 3

Daniel Puertas Gallardo (born 1 December 1992) is a Spanish kickboxer. He is a two-weight ISKA World champion and one-time Wu Lin Feng Tournament winner.

== Kickboxing career ==
Gallardo took part in the 2017 Partouche Kickboxing Tour -63 kg Tournament, held on October 19, 2017. He earned his place in the tournament by winning the June 10th qualification tournament, during which he scored a second-round knockout of Daniel Manzoni and a decision victory against Yetkin Ozkul. In the semifinals of the tournament proper, Gallardo won the semifinal bout against Hicham Moujtahid by a second-round technical knockout. Gallardo fought a rematch with Yetkin Ozkul in the tournament final, which he won by a first-round technical knockout.

Gallardo was scheduled to face Andrej Kevdeš for the W5 European -65 kg title at W5 #42: "European League" on November 11, 2017. He won the fight by majority decision.

Gallardo was scheduled to face Cedric Castagna at Nuit Des Champions on February 24, 2018, for the ISKA World -65 kg title. He won the fight by a third-round technical knockout due to low kicks.

Gallardo participated in the 2018 Kunlun Fight World -61.5 kg Tournament, held at Kunlun Fight 74 on May 13, 2018. Although he was able to defeat Jiao Daobo by decision in the quarterfinals, he in turn lost a decision to Wang Wenfeng in the semifinals.

Gallardo fought the pound for pound great Takeru Segawa at K-1 World GP 2018: inaugural Cruiserweight Championship Tournament on September 24, 2018. He lost the fight by a first-round technical knockout, succumbing to a series of hooks in the third minute of the round.

Gallardo was scheduled to face Eddy Nait Slimani for the vacant La Nuit des Champions -66 kg title at Nuit Des Champions 9 on November 24, 2018. Slimani won the fight by split decision.

Gallardo's losing streak extended to four fights, after he dropped a decision to Yannick Reine at Nuit Des Gladiateurs 10 on January 19, 2019.

Gallardo was scheduled to face Filippos Petaroudis at Empire League Team II on April 6, 2019. He won the fight by a second-round technical knockout.

Gallardo was scheduled to fight Zheng Junfeng in the semifinals of the 2019 Wu Lin Feng Contender Tournament. He won the fight by unanimous decision, and faced Phittaya in the finals. Gallardo won the final bout by a first-round technical knockout.

Gallardo was scheduled to face Panpayak Jitmuangnon at ONE Championship: NextGen III on October 29, 2021. He lost the fight by unanimous decision.

Gallardo faced Jiduo Yibu at ONE: Full Circle on February 25, 2022. He won the fight by split decision.

Gallardo was scheduled to face Rodtang Jitmuangnon on January 14, 2023, at ONE Fight Night 6. However, Puertas was rescheduled to face Superlek Kiatmuu9 for the vacant ONE Flyweight Kickboxing World Championship. He lost the fight via unanimous decision.

== Titles and accomplishments ==
- World Kickboxing League
  - 2014 WKL Pro Spanish Champion
- Wu Lin Feng
  - 2016 Wu Lin Feng -60 kg World Champion
- Partouche Kickboxing Tour
  - 2017 Partouche Kickboxing Tour -63 kg winner
- W5
  - 2017 W5 European -65 kg Champion
- International Sport Karate Association
  - 2015 ISKA K-1 World Lightweight (-60 kg) Champion
  - 2018 ISKA K-1 World Light-welterweight (-65 kg) Champion

== Kickboxing record ==
Kickboxing record
33 wins (13 (T)KOs), 13 losses
Date	Result	Opponent	Event	Location	Method	Round	Time
2026-11-21		(Switzerland) Abdu Elghami	Pilatus Fight Night	Kriens, Switzerland			
2026-06-13	Loss	(France) Soheil Dridi	Pilon Fight Event	Le Creusot, France	TKO	4	
For the vacant ISKA K-1 World Super-lightweight (-63.5kg) title.
2026-03-28	Loss	(France) Jérémy Monteiro	La Nuit des Titans 2026, Semifinals	Tours, France	Decision	3	3:00
2026-02-06	Loss	(Thailand) Lamnamoonlek Or.Atchariya	ONE Friday Fights 141, Lumpinee Stadium	Bangkok, Thailand	Decision (unanimous)	3	3:00
2024-09-28	Loss	(China) Zhao Chongyang	Wu Lin Feng 548 - 63 kg Tournament, Semifinal	Tangshan, China	KO (low kicks)	2	1:00
2024-06-15	Loss	(Japan) Taiga	RISE WORLD SERIES 2024 OSAKA	Osaka, Japan	Decision (unanimous)	3	3:00
2024-01-27	Win	(China) Zhao Chongyang	Wu Lin Feng 2024: 12th Global Kung Fu Festival	Tangshan, China	KO (left hook)	1	0:50
2023-01-14	Loss	(Thailand) Superlek Kiatmuu9	ONE Fight Night 6	Bangkok, Thailand	Decision (unanimous)	5	3:00
For the vacant ONE Flyweight Kickboxing World Championship.
2022-02-25	Win	(China) Jiduo Yibu	ONE: Full Circle	Kallang, Singapore	Decision (split)	3	3:00
2021-10-29	Loss	(Thailand) Panpayak Jitmuangnon	ONE Championship: NextGen III	Kallang, Singapore	Decision (unanimous)	3	3:00
2019-09-28	Win	(Thailand) Phittaya	WLF -67kg World Cup 2019-2020 - Contender Tournament, Final	Zhengzhou, China	TKO (punches)	1	
2019-09-28	Win	(China) Zheng Junfeng	WLF -67kg World Cup 2019-2020 - Contender Tournament, Semifinals	Zhengzhou, China	Decision (unanimous)	3	3:00
2019-04-06	Win	(Greece) Filippos Petaroudis	Empire League Team II	Spain	TKO (referee stoppage)	2	
2019-01-19	Loss	(France) Yannick Reine	Nuit Des Gladiateurs 10	Marseille, France	Decision	3	3:00
2018-11-24	Loss	(France) Eddy Nait Slimani	Nuit Des Champions	Marseille, France	Decision (split)	5	3:00
For the vacant La Nuit des Champions -66kg title.
2018-09-24	Loss	(Japan) Takeru	K-1 World GP 2018: inaugural Cruiserweight Championship Tournament	Saitama, Japan	KO (punches)	1	2:08
2018-05-13	Loss	(China) Wang Wenfeng	Kunlun Fight 74 World -61.5 kg Tournament, Semifinals	Jinan, China	Decision	3	3:00
2018-05-13	Win	(China) Jiao Daobo	Kunlun Fight 74 World -61.5 kg Tournament, Quarterfinals	Jinan, China	Decision	3	3:00
2018-02-24	Win	(France) Cedric Castagna	Nuit Des Champions	Vitrolles, France	TKO (low kicks)	3	
Wins the vacant ISKA K-1 World -65kg title.
2017-11-11	Win	(Croatia) Andrej Kedveš	W5 #42: "European League"	Košice, Slovakia	Decision (majority)	5	3:00
Wins W5 European -65kg title.
2017-10-19	Win	(Turkey) Yetkin Ozkul	Partouche Kickboxing Tour -63 kg Tournament, Final	La Tour-de-Salvagny, France	TKO (ref. stop/high knee)	1	2:48
Wins 2017 Partouche Kickboxing Tour -63kg title.
2017-10-19	Win	(Belgium) Hicham Moujtahid	Partouche Kickboxing Tour -63 kg Tournament, Semifinals	La Tour-de-Salvagny, France	TKO	2	
2017-06-10	Win	(Turkey) Yetkin Ozkul	Partouche Kickboxing Tour -63 kg Qualification Round, Final	Bandol, France	Decision	3	3:00
2017-06-10	Win	(France) Daniel Manzoni	Partouche Kickboxing Tour -63 kg Qualification Round, Semifinals	Bandol, France	KO	3	
2017-05-06	Win	(China) Chen Wende	Wu Lin Feng 2017, -63 kg Tournament B Group, Final	Zhengzhou, China	KO	2	
2017-05-06	Win	(Hong Kong) Chin Ngaichung	Wu Lin Feng 2017, -63 kg Tournament Group B, Semifinals	Zhengzhou, China	KO	1	
2016-10-29	Win	(Suriname) Sergio Wielzen	Wu Lin Feng x KO Fighters 2	Marbella, Spain	Ext.R decision	4	3:00
Wins the inaugural Wu Lin Feng -60kg World title.
2016-06-18	Win	(Spain) Khyzer Hayat	KO Fighters Series	Córdoba, Spain	Decision	3	3:00
2016-04-30	Win	(China) Wang Zhiwei	Wu Lin Feng	Zhengzhou, China	Ext.R decision	4	3:00
2016-03-05	Loss	(Algeria) Karim Bennoui	MFC 4	Saint-Priest, France	Decision	5	3:00
2016-02-13	Win	(France) Mikael Peynaud	Ultimatum Fight Night	Fuengirola, Spain	Decision	3	3:00
2015-09-19	Win	(France) Ahmed Moufti	Enfusion Live	Benahavís, Spain	Decision	3	3:00
2015-07-01	Loss	(Thailand) Petchboonchu Sor.Sommai	T-One	China	Decision	5	3:00
2015-05-16	Win	(Spain) Carlos Campos	International Kombat	San Pedro de Alcántara, Spain	Decision	3	3:00
2015-05-10	Win	(United Kingdom) Anthony Ferguson	Shock Wave 5	Milton Keynes, United Kingdom	KO (right hook)	1	
Wins ISKA K-1 World -60kg title.
2015-03-07	Loss	(Turkey) Yetkin Ozkul	Le Choc des Légendes	Saint-Ouen, France	Decision	5	3:00
2014-11-30	Win	(Portugal) Bruno Almeida	Super Kombat III	Los Palacios y Villafranca, Spain	KO	2	
2014-07-12	Win	(Ukraine) Roman Skulskiy	Enfusion Live, Final	Mallorca, Spain	TKO	2	
2014-07-12	Win	(Spain) Elvis Bonnin	Enfusion Live, Semi Final	Mallorca, Spain	TKO	2	
Legend: Win Loss Draw/no contest Notes

== See also ==
- List of male kickboxers
