= Eddy Nait Slimani =

French kickboxer (born 1993)

Eddy Naït Slimani
- Born: 25 August 1993 (age 33); Vienne, France
- Height: 1.73 m (5 ft 8 in)
- Weight: 65 kg (143 lb; 10.2 st)
- Division: Super Bantamweight
- Style: Kickboxing, Full Contact
- Stance: Orthodox
- Fighting out of: France
- Team: Gym Boxe Loisirs
- Trainer: David Blanc
- Years active: 2013 - present

Kickboxing record
- Total: 51
- Wins: 43
- By knockout: 8
- Losses: 8
- By knockout: 2

Other information
- Boxing record from BoxRec

Eddy Nait Slimani (born 25 August 1993) is a French kickboxer.

== Professional kickboxing career ==
Nait Slimani made his professional debut against Hamza Essalih at Stars Night in January 2013. He won the fight by decision. Nait Slimani won his next fight against Jordi Fernaandez in the same manner. In October 2013, Slimani took part in the World GBC Tour 5 tournament. He defeated Alessandro Alias by decision in the semifinals, and Mohamed Galaoui by decision in the finals.

Nait Slimani won his next three fights in a row, against Mehdi Traia, Anthony Recio and Soufiane Hammani. He then participated in the Simply The Boxe four man tournament. In the semifinals, he beat William Saidi by first-round knockout, and won the tournament with a decision win against Vang Moua.

After his second tournament win, Nait Slimani was scheduled to fight Edson Fortes at La Nuit des Gladiateurs, and won the fight by decision. He was subsequently scheduled to fight Allan Gozdzicki for the WKN European 64.5 kg title. Nait Slimani beat Gozdzicki by decision. Following a successful title defense against Antoine Habash at World GBC Tour 8, Nait Slimani took part in the 2015 Simply The Boxe four man tournament. He beat Franck Reoutzkoff by knockout in the semifinals, and Yohann Drai by split decision in the finals.

In May 2015, Nait Slimani suffered the first loss of his professional career, losing to Cedric Castagna by decision. The two of them then fought an immediate rematch, with Nait Slimani winning by decision. Nait Slimani was then scheduled to fight Antonio Campoy at Battle of Saint-Raphael 3 for the WKN International -66.7 kg title. He knocked Campoy out in the first round.

Nait Slimani participated in his second World GBC Tour four man tournament, and faced Cosmin Podoriu in the semifinal. Nait Slimani beat him by decision, and won the tournament with a second-round TKO of Houcine Bennoui.

After a decision victory over Samir Mohamed, Nait Slimani signed a one-year contract with Glory. In his first fight, Slimani fought Maykol Yurk at Glory 28: Paris, and won by decision. Slimani afterwards beat Stephane Candel and Mehdi Berisha by decision. In his second Glory fight, Nait Slimani fought the muay thai legend Saenchai at Glory 31: Amsterdam.

Nait Slimani was scheduled to fight Mathieu Bernard at World GBC Tour 11, and won by decision. He was then scheduled to fight Masaaki Noiri for the NDC 66 kg title. Noiri won the fight by knockout, in the very last seconds of the fight.

In his next fight, Nait Slimani fought Modibo Diarra at Stars Night, and won by decision. At ACB KB 9: Showdown in Paris, he fought David Mejia. Nait Slimani defeated Mejia by decision.

At Capital Fights 2, Nait Slimani challenged Yannick Reine for the ISKA K-1 World 63.5 kg title. Reine successfully defended the title, winning by decision.

During the 2017 Monte-Carlo Fighting Trophy event, Nait Slimani fought a rematch with Antoine Habash, for the WAKO Pro World -64.5 kg title. Nait Slimani once again won, beating Habash by a second-round knockout.

Nait Slimani was scheduled to fight Dong-Su Kim at World GBC Tour 12, for the WKN World -64.5 kg title. He knocked Kim out in the first round, with a head kick.

Slimani fought Karim Bennoui at Nuit Des Champions 2017, and won the fight by decision. He won his next three fights, winning decisions against Charlie Peters, Khyzer Hayat Nawaz and Denis Wosik. His six fight winning streak was snapped at Enfusion 60, during which he lost an extra round decision in a rematch with Hamza Essalih.

In November 2018, Slimani fought Daniel Puertas Gallardo for the vacant La Nuit des Champions -65 kg title. He beat Gallardo by split decision. In his next fight, he fought Yvan Naccari and won by majority decision. Slimani defended his NDC title for the first time against Sergey Kulyaba in November 2019, and won the fight by split decision.

Slimani was scheduled to fight Adam Noi, at Arena Fight Championship 2, for the inaugural Arena Fight K-1 -65 kg title. The entire event was later postponed, due to the COVID-19 pandemic.

Nait Slimani was scheduled to face Hayat Khyzer at La Nuit Des Gladiateurs 12 on September 18, 2021. He won the fight by decision.

In the fall of 2021, Nait Slimani signed with the Superkombat Fighting Championship. He made his promotional debut at Superkombat Universe on November 1, 2021, against Mo Monteur for the world super lightweight title. Slimani lost the fight by a first-round knockout.

Slimani made his second Nuit des Champions -65 kg title defense against Anass Ahmidouch at La Nuit Des Champions 29 on November 19, 2022. He lost the fight by decision.

Slimani faced Bayram Gashi at Fight Night One 15 on March 4, 2023. He won the fight by decision. Slimani faced Eduardo Del Prado at Fight Night One 16 on June 24, 2023.

Slimani was expected to challenge Václav Sivák for the WAKO Pro World K-1 Light Welterweight (-64.5 kg) title at Yangames Fight Night on July 29, 2023. Sivák withdrew from the fight on July 28, after suffering a hand injury in training.

Slimani rematched Anass Ahmidouch on April 6, 2024, at La Nuit des Gladiateurs 15 for the promotion's -65 kg title. He won the fight by unanimous decision.

== Titles and achievements ==
=== Amateur ===
- 5x French National Kickboxing Champion (2007, 2008, 2009, 2010, 2012)
- 5x French National Full Contact Champion (2007, 2008, 2009, 2010, 2012)
- International Sport Kickboxing Association
  - 2010 ISKA World Championships Light Contact -63.5 kg (gold)
  - 2010 ISKA World Championships Semi Contact -63.5 kg (gold)
- International Kickboxing Federation
  - 2011 IKF Junior Full Contact European -60 kg Champion
  - 2012 IKF Full Contact European -64,5 kg Champion
- World Association of Kickboxing Organizations
  - 2012 WAKO Wold Cup Full Contact -63,5 kg (gold)
- World Kickboxing Network
  - 2013 WKN K-1 European -63.5 kg Champion

=== Professional ===
- World GBC Tour
  - 2014 World GBC Tour 4-Man 65 kg Tournament Winner
  - 2015 World GBC Tour 4-Man 65 kg Tournament Winner
- Simply The Boxe
  - 2014 Simply The Boxe 4-Man 65 kg Tournament Winner
  - 2015 Simply The Boxe 4-Man 65 kg Tournament Winner
- World Kickboxing Network
  - 2014 WKN K-1 European -64.5 kg Champion
    - One successful title defense
  - 2015 WKN Oriental rules International -66.7 kg Champion
  - 2017 WKN Oriental Rules World -64.5 kg Champion
  - 2024 WKN K-1 World -64.5 kg Champion
    - One successful title defense
- World Association of Kickboxing Organizations
  - 2017 WAKO Pro World -64.5 kg K-1 Champion
- La Nuit des Champions
  - 2018 La Nuit des Champions -65 kg Champion
    - One successful title defense

== Fight record ==
Professional Kickboxing record
43 Wins (8 (T)KO's), 8 Losses
Date	Result	Opponent	Event	Location	Method	Round	Time
2026-10-31		(Spain) Aitor Currito	GBC World Tour 2026	Avignon, France			
Defending the WKN K-1 World -64.4kg title.
2025-10-15	Win	(South Korea) Ji Myeong Seo	GBC World Tour 2025	Avignon, France	Decision (Unanimous)	5	3:00
Defends the WKN K-1 World -64.4kg title.
2024-11-16	Loss	(Spain) Aitor Currito	La Nuit des Champions 31 - Tournament, Semifinals	Marseille, France	Ext.R Decision	4	3:00
2024-10-19	Win	(France) Vincent Naxos	World GBC Tour	Avignon, France	Decision (Unanimous)	5	3:00
Wins the WKN K-1 World -64.4kg title.
2024-04-06	Win	(Morocco) Anass Ahmidouch	La Nuit Des Gladiateurs 15	Marseille, France	Decision (Unanimous)	5	3:00
Wins La Nuit des Gladiateurs -65kg title.
2023-06-24	Win	(Spain) Eduardo Del Prado	Fight Night One 16	Chasse-sur-Rhône, France	Decision	3	3:00
2023-04-29	Win	(Germany) Bayram Gashi	Fight Night One 15	Chalon-sur-Saône, France	Decision	3	3:00
2022-11-19	Loss	(Morocco) Anass Ahmidouch	La Nuit Des Champions 29	Marseille, France	Decision	5	3:00
Lost La Nuit des Champions -65kg title.
2022-05-21	Win	(Spain) Nacho Menen	Stars Night 2022	Vitrolles, France	Decision	3	3:00
2022-04-22	Win	(Spain) Mikel Sortino	La Nuit Des Gladiateurs 13	Marseille, France	Decision (Unanimous)	3	3:00
2021-11-01	Loss	(Morocco) Mohamed El Mesbahi	Superkombat Universe	Dubai, UAE	KO (left head kick)	1	1:14
For the inaugural Superkombat World Super Lightweight Championship.
2021-09-18	Win	(Spain) Khyzer Hayat	La Nuit Des Gladiateurs 12	Marseille, France	Decision	3	3:00
2019-11-16	Win	(Ukraine) Sergey Kulyaba	La Nuit Des Champions	Marseille, France	Decision (Split)	5	3:00
Defends La Nuit des Champions -65kg title.
2019-10-12	Win	(Italy) Ivan Naccari	World GBC Tour 14	Mazan, France	Decision (Majority)	3	3:00
2018-11-24	Win	(Spain) Daniel Puertas Gallardo	La Nuit Des Champions	Marseille, France	Decision (Split)	5	3:00
For the vacant La Nuit des Champions -65kg title.
2018-10-27	Loss	(Morocco) Hamza Essalih	Enfusion Talents #60	Oberhausen, Germany	Ext.R Decision	4	3:00
2018-10-13	Win	(Germany) Denis Wosik	World GBC Tour 13	Mazan, France	Decision (Unanimous)	3	3:00
2018-05-26	Win	(Spain) Khyzer Hayat Nawaz	Octogone 2	Marseille, France	Decision (Unanimous)	3	3:00
2018-01-13	Win	(United Kingdom) Charlie Peters	Nuit des Gladiateurs 9	Marseille, France	Decision	3	3:00
2017-11-25	Win	(France) Karim Bennoui	Nuit Des Champions 2017	Marseille, France	Decision	3	3:00
2017-10-14	Win	(Korea) Dong-Su Kim	World GBC Tour 12	Mazan, France	KO (Right High Kick)	1	
Wins WKN Oriental rules World -64.5kg title.
2017-06-30	Win	(Hungary) Antoine Habash	Monte-Carlo Fighting Trophy	Monaco, France	KO (Jumping back Kick)	2	2:03
Wins WAKO Pro World -64.5kg title.
2017-05-20	Loss	(France) Yannick Reine	Capital Fights 2	Paris, France	Decision	5	3:00
For the ISKA K-1 World 63.5kg title
2017-03-25	Win	(Spain) David Mejia	ACB KB 9: Showdown in Paris	Paris, France	Decision (Unanimous)	3	3:00
2017-02-11	Win	(France) Modibo Diarra	Stars Night	Vitrolles, France	Decision	3	3:00
2016-11-19	Loss	(Japan) Masaaki Noiri	Nuit Des Champions 2016	Marseille, France	KO (Left Knee to The Body)	3	2:57
For the vacant NDC 66kg title.
2016-10-08	Win	(Belgium) Mathieu Bernard	World GBC Tour 11	Mazan, France	Decision	3	3:00
2016-06-25	Loss	(Thailand) Saenchai	Glory 31: Amsterdam	Amsterdam, Netherlands	Decision (Unanimous)	3	3:00
2016-04-06	Win	(France) Mehdi Berisha	Fight Night 1	Saint-Étienne, France	Decision	3	3:00
2016-03-26	Win	(Belgium) Stephane Candel	World GBC Tour 10	France	Decision	3	3:00
2016-03-12	Win	(Brazil) Maykol Yurk	Glory 28: Paris	Paris, France	Decision (Unanimous)	3	3:00
2015-11-14	Win	(France) Samir Mohamed	Nuit des Champions 2015	Marseille, France	KO (Punch)	1	
2015-10-10	Win	(France) Houcine Bennoui	World GBC Tour 9, Final	Mazan, France	TKO (Punches)	2	
Wins the GBC Tour 4-Man tournament.
2015-10-10	Win	(Romania) Cosmin Podoriu	World GBC Tour 9, Semi Final	Mazan, France	Decision	3	3:00
2015-09-12	Win	(Spain) Antonio Campoy	Battle of Saint-Raphael 3	Saint-Raphaël, Var, France	KO	1	
Wins WKN Oriental rules International -66.7kg title.
2015-06-26	Win	(France) Cedric Castagna	La Nuit des Gladiateurs	Marseille, France	Decision	3	3:00
2015-05-23	Loss	(France) Cedric Castagna	IXeme Tophée des Etoiles	Aix-en-Provence, France	Decision	3	3:00
2015-04-18	Win	(France) Yohann Drai	Simply The Boxe, Final	France	Decision (Split)	3	3:00
Wins the Simply The Boxe 4-Man tournament.
2015-04-18	Win	(France) Franck Reoutzkoff	Simply The Boxe, Semi Final	France	KO (Hook)	2	
2015-02-07	Win	(Hungary) Antoine Habash	World GBC Tour 8	France	TKO (Corner Stoppage)	3	3:00
Defends WKN K-1 European -64.5kg title.
2014-11-22	Win	(France) Samir Mohamed	Nuit des Champions 2014	Marseille, France	Decision	3	3:00
2014-10-04	Win	(Belgium) Allan Gozdzicki	World GBC Tour 7	Mazan, France	Decision	3	3:00
Wins WKN K-1 European -64.5kg title.
2014-06-27	Win	(Netherlands) Edson Fortes	La Nuit des Gladiateurs	Marseille, France	Decision	3	3:00
2014-04-12	Win	(France) Vang Moua	Simply The Boxe, Final	La Penne-sur-Huveaune, France	Decision	3	3:00
Wins the Simply The Boxe 4-Man tournament.
2014-04-12	Win	(France) William Saidi	Simply The Boxe, Semi Final	La Penne-sur-Huveaune, France	KO	1	
2014-02-15	Win	(France) Soufiane Hammani	World GBC Tour 6	France	Decision	3	3:00
2013-12-20	Win	(France) Anthony Recio	Fight Night	Marseille, France	Decision	3	3:00
2013-10-26	Win	(France) Mehdi Traia	Choc des guerriers 3	France	Decision	3	3:00
2013-10-05	Win	(France) Mohamed Galaoui	World GBC Tour 5, Final	France	Decision	3	3:00
Wins the GBC Tour 4-Man tournament.
2013-10-05	Win	(Italy) Alessandro Alias	World GBC Tour 5, Semi Final	France	Decision	3	3:00
2013-03-30	Win	(Spain) Jordi Fernaandez	10th Trophée de l'Ephèbe de Kick-Boxing	France	Decision	3	3:00
2013-01-26	Win	(Morocco) Hamza Essalih	Stars Night	Vitrolles, France	Decision	3	3:00
Legend: Win Loss Draw/No contest Notes

Amateur Kickboxing record
39 Wins (11 (T)KO's), 0 Loss
Date	Result	Opponent	Event	Location	Method	Round	Time
2013-06-08	Win	(Georgia (country)) Giga Adamshvili	WKN	Tbilisi, Georgia	KO	3	
Wins WKN Amateur European K-1 -65kg title.
2012-06-03	Win	(Norway) Milton Barrios Galarreta	WAKO World Cup Bestfighter 2012, Final	Rimini, Italy			
Wins WAKO World Cup Bestfighter 2012 Full Contact -63.5kg Gold Medal.
2012-06-02	Win		WAKO World Cup Bestfighter 2012, Semi Final	Rimini, Italy			
2012-05-19	Win	(Republic of Ireland) Dylan Moran	Ringside promotion - IKF Kickboxing	Thurles, Ireland	Decision		
Wins IKF European Full Contact -64.5kg title.
2011-04-15	Win	(Republic of Ireland) Dylan O'Connor	Ringside promotion - IKF Kickboxing	Thurles, Ireland	KO	3	
Wins IKF Junior European Full Contact -60kg title.
Legend: Win Loss Draw/No contest Notes

== See also ==
- List of male kickboxers
