= Bruno Gazani =

Brazilian kickboxer

- Born: Bruno Felipe Gomes Gazani; 10 January 1986 (age 40); São Paulo, Brazil
- Height: 1.76 m (5 ft 9 1/2 in)
- Weight: 70.0 kg (154.3 lb; 11.02 st)
- Division: Lightweight
- Style: Kickboxing
- Stance: Orthodox
- Fighting out of: São Paulo, Brazil
- Team: União ABC

Kickboxing record
- Total: 83
- Wins: 71
- By knockout: 35
- Losses: 11
- By knockout: 0
- Draws: 1

Other information
- Boxing record from BoxRec

Bruno Felipe Gomes Gazani (born 10 January 1986) is a Brazilian professional kickboxer. He currently competes in the Lightweight division of GLORY. As of 31 July 2022, he is #9 in the GLORY lightweight rankings.

== Kickboxing career ==
=== Early years ===
Gazani fought Wellingtom Tom for the WAKO PRO Brazil -70 kg Title during WGP 22, winning the fight by decision. During WGP 28, Gazani fought a rematch with Ravy Brunow for the WGP Kickboxing -72 kg Title. Brunow won the fight by decision. He fought for the same title again two years later, at WGP 44, against Marcelo Dionísio. He was more successful this time, winning by decision.

At Heat 43, he took part in the HEAT tournament. He defeated Himalayan Cheetah by decision in the semifinal, and Robson Minotinho by decision in the finals. A month later, Gazani defended his WGP title with a decision win against Robson Minotinho. In November 2018, Gazani fought Samo Petje for the FFC Lightweight Kickboxing Title. The fight ended in a draw. Gazani defended the WGP title a further two times, winning decisions against Petros Cabelinho and Damian Segovia.

=== Glory ===
He made his Glory debut during Glory 70, against Michael Palandre. Gazani won the fight by split decision.

He was scheduled to fight at Glory 73, against Vlad Tuinov. He won the fight by a third round TKO.

Gazani was scheduled to fight Mohamed Hendouf during Glory 75. He won the fight by split decision.

Gazani was scheduled to face Stoyan Koprivlenski at Glory: Collision 3 on October 23, 2021. He lost the fight by unanimous decision.

Gazani faced Salimkhan Ibragimov at RCC 10 on December 17, 2021. He lost the fight by unanimous decision. Gazani next faced Dragomir Petrov at Senshi 12 on July 9, 2022. He won the fight by unanimous decision.

Gazani was expected to face Nick Chasteen at Glory Rivals 5 on January 28, 2023, in what was his first bout under the Glory promotional banner in over two years. Chasteen withdrew from the fight due to visa issues and was replaced by Magnus Andersson. Gazani lost the fight by split decision.

== Championships and awards ==
Amateur

- 2016 WAKO PANAMERICAN Games -70 kg (gold)

Professional

- World Association of Kickboxing Organizations (WAKO)
  - 2019 WAKO Pro Pan American -72 kg Champion
- WGP Kickboxing
  - 2018 WGP Kickboxing -72 kg Champion (three title defenses)
- HEAT
  - 2018 HEAT -70 kg 4-man Tournament winner

== Kickboxing record ==
Professional kickboxing record
71 wins (35 (T)KOs), 11 losses, 1 draw
Date	Result	Opponent	Event	Location	Method	Round	Time
2026-05-30	Win	(Romania) Marian Lăpușneanu	Senshi 31 – 70 kg Grand Prix, 3rd place fight	Plovdiv, Bulgaria	TKO (knee to the body)	2	1:48
2026-05-30	Loss	(Italy) Angelo Volpe	Senshi 31 – 70 kg Grand Prix, Semifinals	Plovdiv, Bulgaria	Decision (majority)	3	3:00
2026-05-30	Win	(Morocco) Aissam Chadid	Senshi 31 – 70 kg Grand Prix, Quarterfinals	Plovdiv, Bulgaria	Decision (unanimous)	3	3:00
2025-07-12	Win	(France) Guerric Billet	Senshi 27	Varna, Bulgaria	Decision (unanimous)	3	3:00
2024-12-07	Win	(Romania) Marius Cimpoieru	Senshi 24	Varna, Bulgaria	KO (left hook)	1	
2023-07-08	Loss	(Slovenia) Samo Petje	Senshi 17	Varna, Bulgaria	Decision (split)	3	3:00
2023-01-28	Loss	(Sweden) Magnus Andersson	Glory Rivals 5	Tulum, Mexico	Decision (split)	3	3:00
2022-07-09	Win	(Bulgaria) Dragomir Petrov	Senshi 12	Varna, Bulgaria	Decision (unanimous)	3	3:00
2021-12-18	Loss	(Russia) Salimkhan Ibragimov	RCC 10	Yekaterinburg, Russia	Decision (unanimous)	3	3:00
2021-10-23	Loss	(Bulgaria) Stoyan Koprivlenski	Glory: Collision 3	Arnhem, Netherlands	Decision (unanimous)	3	3:00
2020-02-29	Win	(Morocco) Mohamed Hendouf	Glory 75: Utrecht	Utrecht, Netherlands	Decision (split)	3	3:00
2019-12-07	Win	(Russia) Vlad Tuinov	Glory 73: Shenzhen	Shenzhen, China	KO (knee to the body)	3	0:23
2019-10-26	Win	(France) Michael Palandre	Glory 70: Lyon	Lyon, France	Decision (split)	3	3:00
2019-08-02	Win	(Argentina) Damian Segovia	WGP Kickboxing #56	Buenos Aires, Argentina	Decision (split)	5	3:00
Defends WGP Kickboxing -72 kg Title and wins WAKO Pro Pan American -72kg title.
2019-04-06	Win	(Brazil) Petros Cabelinho	WGP Kickboxing #53	São Bernardo do Campo, Brazil	Decision	5	3:00
Defends WGP Kickboxing -72 kg Title.
2018-11-16	Draw	(Slovenia) Samo Petje	Final Fight Championship 34	Las Vegas, United States	Decision (majority)	5	3:00
For the FFC Lightweight Kickboxing Title.
2018-10-27	Win	(Brazil) Robson Minotinho	WGP Kickboxing #50	São Bernardo do Campo, Brazil	Decision	5	3:00
Defends WGP Kickboxing -72 kg Title.
2018-09-17	Win	(Nepal) Abiral Ghimire	HEAT 43, Final	Nagoya, Japan	Decision (unanimous)	3	3:00
2018-09-17	Win	(Bolivia) David Zurita	HEAT 43, Semi Final	Nagoya, Japan	KO	1	2:08
2018-02-23	Win	(Brazil) Marcelo Dionísio	WGP Kickboxing #44	São Bernardo do Campo, Brazil	Decision	5	3:00
Wins WGP Kickboxing -72 kg Title.
2017-11-12	Win	(Brazil) Anderson Buzika	WGP Kickboxing #42	São Paulo, Brazil	Decision (unanimous)	3	3:00
2017-09-16	Win	(Brazil) Rafael Teixeira	WGP Kickboxing #40	Guarapuava, Brazil	Decision	3	3:00
2017-03-04	Win	(China) Hao Shengbin	Glory of Heroes 7	São Paulo, Brazil	Decision	3	3:00
2016-12-02	Win	(Guinea-Bissau) Iamik Furtado	WGP Kickboxing 35	Brazil	Decision (unanimous)	3	3:00
2016–08-20	Win	(Brazil) Max Koubik	Road to Glory Brazil Tournament, Final	Brazil	Decision (unanimous)	3	3:00
Wins Road to Glory Brazil Tournament.
2016–08-20	Win	(Brazil) Vitor Formigão	Road to Glory Brazil Tournament, Semi Final	Brazil	Decision	3	3:00
2016–08-20	Win	(Brazil) João Victor	Road to Glory Brazil Tournament, Quarter Final	Brazil	KO (left knee to the body)	1	
2016-07-16	Loss	(Brazil) Ravy Brunow	WGP Kickboxing #32	Brazil	Decision (unanimous)	5	3:00
For the WGP Kickboxing -72 kg Title.
2016-05-08	Win	(Argentina) Emanuel Ramponi	WGP Kickboxing 30	Brazil	KO (flying knee)	3	1:45
2015-12-19	Loss	(Brazil) Ravy Brunow	WGP Kickboxing #28	Brazil	Decision	5	3:00
For the WGP Kickboxing -72 kg Title.
2015-11-07	Loss	(Brazil) Carlos Roberto Formiga	XI Desafio de Muay Thai	Brazil	Decision	5	3:00
2015-07-25	Win	(Brazil) Wallace Lopes	WGP Kickboxing #25	Brazil	TKO (corner stoppage)	2	3:00
2014-09-27	Win	(Brazil) Wellingtom Tom	WGP Kickboxing #22	São Paulo, Brazil	Decision	5	3:00
Wins WAKO PRO Brazil -70 kg Title.
2014-05-17	Win	(Brazil) Janio Mancha	WGP Kickboxing #20, Final	Brazil	Decision	3	3:00
2014-05-17	Win	(Brazil) Maycon Oller	WGP Kickboxing #20, Semi Final	Brazil	Decision	3	3:00
2013-12-21	Win	(Brazil) Anderson Buzika	WGP Kickboxing #17	Brazil	Decision	3	3:00
2013-11-09	Win	(Brazil) Daniel Nery	WGP Kickboxing #16	São Paulo, Brazil	KO (punches)	2	1:30
2013-06-22	Loss	(Brazil) Ravy Brunow	IX DESAFIO MUAYTHAI	Brazil	Decision	5	3:00
2013-04	Win	(Brazil) Alex Oller		Brazil	Decision	3	3:00
2013-02-23	Win	(Ukraine) Enriko Gogokhia	Tatneft Arena World Cup 2013 4th selection 1/8 final (-70 kg)	Kazan, Russia	Decision (unanimous)	4	3:00
2012-12-08	Win	(Brazil) Carlos Formiga	Tatneft Cup Brazil, Final	Brazil	Decision	4	3:00
Wins Tatneft Cup Brazil -70 kg Title.
2012-12-08	Win	(Brazil) Renan Mazza	Tatneft Cup Brazil, Semi Final	Brazil	Decision	4	3:00
2012-12-08	Win	(Brazil)	Tatneft Cup Brazil, Quarter Final	Brazil			
2012-08-04	Win	(Brazil) Junior Pinico	Mr Fight II	Brazil	KO (knees)		
2012	Loss	(Brazil) Milton Matos		Brazil	Decision	3	3:00
2012	Win	(Brazil) Elder Allan		Brazil	Decision	5	3:00
Legend: Win Loss Draw/no contest Notes

Amateur kickboxing record
Date	Result	Opponent	Event	Location	Method	Round	Time
2017-10-27	Loss	(Israel) Itay Gershon	2017 World Games, Bronze medal fight	Wrocław, Poland	Decision (unanimous)	3	2:00
2017-10-26	Loss	(Bulgaria) Bogdan Shumarov	2017 World Games, Semifinals	Wrocław, Poland	Decision (unanimous)	3	2:00
2017-10-25	Win	(Morocco) Saad Qabissi	2017 World Games, Quarterfinals	Wrocław, Poland	Decision (unanimous)	3	2:00
2016-10-26	Win	(United States)	WAKO PANAMERICAN Championship, Final	Mexico			
Wins 2016 WAKO PANAMERICAN -70 kg Title.
2016-10-26	Win		WAKO PANAMERICAN Championship, Semi Final	Mexico			
2016-10-26	Win		WAKO PANAMERICAN Championship, Quarter Final	Mexico			
Legend: Win Loss Draw/no contest Notes

== See also ==
- List of male kickboxers
