= Jordi Requejo =

Spanish kickboxer

Jordi Requejo Coronado
- Born: November 17, 1998 (age 27); Barcelona
- Other names: Pitbull
- Nationality: Spanish
- Height: 1.81 m (5 ft 11 in)
- Weight: 75 kg (165 lb; 11.8 st)
- Division: Light middleweight
- Style: K-1
- Team: Pugnator Castellet
- Trainer: David Martinez

Kickboxing record
- Total: 80
- Wins: 59
- By knockout: 18
- Losses: 18
- By knockout: 2
- Draws: 3

Jordi Requejo Coronado (born November 17, 1998) is a Spanish kickboxer who competes in the light middleweight division. He is the current WKN World Super Welterweight Champion.

== Career ==
On May 25, 2019, Requejo faced Štefan Mészáros for the WKN World super welterweight title at the Trophée de l’Éphèbe de Kickboxing 16 event. He won the fight by TKO in the first round after his opponent broke his tibia.

On July 10, 2021, Requejo made the first defense of his WKN world title at Villejuif Boxing Show 3 against Christian Berthely. Requejo won the fight by majority decision.

On March 30, 2019, Requejo faced Mickael Pignolo at a BFS event. The fight was declared a draw after three rounds.

Requejo was scheduled to face the reigning ISKA super welterweight world champion Guerric Billet at La Nuit Des Champions 28 on November 20, 2021, in a non-title bout. He won the fight by decision.

On July 2, 2022, Requejo faced Kevin Yapi as a defense of his WAKO Pro European title at Le Choc des Best Fighters 6 event. He lost the fight by decision.

== Championships and accomplishments ==
=== Professional ===
- World Kickboxing Network
  - WKN World Super Welterweight Championship (Two Times)
    - One successful title defense
- World Association of Kickboxing Organizations
  - WAKO-PRO European −71.8 kg/158.2 lb Championship (One Time)
- Organizacion Mundial Kick Boxing España
  - OMKE Catalunia −70 kg Champion

=== Amateur ===
- 2015 FCKBMT Catalonia Kickboxing Champion (gold)
- 2021 FCKBMT Catalonia K-1 Champion -75 (gold)
- 2021 FEKM Spain K-1 Champion -75 (gold)
- 2021 WAKO Open Uzbekistan K-1 -75 (silver)
- 2021 WAKO World Cup in Hungary K-1 -75 kg (bronze)
- 2022 WAKO European Championships K-1 -75 kg (bronze)
- 2023 FEKM Spain K-1 Champion -75 (gold)
- 2023 WAKO World Championships K-1 -75 kg (bronze)
- 2025 WAKO World Championships K-1 -75 kg (gold)

== Kickboxing record ==
Professional Kickboxing record
18 wins (6 KOs), 10 losses, 3 draws
Date	Result	Opponent	Event	Location	Method	Round	Time
2026-05-16	Win	(Spain) Dorian Padrón	K-1 World MAX 2026 in Canary Islands	Las Palmas, Spain	Decision	3	3:00
2026-02-28	Loss	(Netherlands) Christian Baya	SENSHI 30 – 75 kg Grand Prix, Semifinals	Varna, Bulgaria	KO (Calf kicks)	1	1:55
2026-02-28	Win	(Bulgaria) Konstantin Stoykov	SENSHI 30 – 75 kg Grand Prix, Quarterfinals	Varna, Bulgaria	Decision (Unanimous)	3	3:00
2025-07-12	Win	(Spain) Jamal Raad	NEW KUMITE RULES - 75 kg WORLD TOURNAMENT	Madrid, Spain	Decision (Unanimous)	1	3:00
2025-07-12	Win	(Spain) Said Ennayeb	NEW KUMITE RULES - 75 kg WORLD TOURNAMENT	Madrid, Spain	Decision (Unanimous)	1	3:00
2025-07-12	Win	(Spain) Ayoub Joaou	NEW KUMITE RULES - 75 kg WORLD TOURNAMENT	Madrid, Spain	Decision (Unanimous)	1	3:00
2024-12-14	Loss	(Serbia) Nikola Todorović	UAM K-1 Pro Night	Abu Dhabi, UAE	TKO (retirement/arm injury)	2	
For the WAKO-PRO K-1 World Super-middleweight (−78.1 kg) Championship.
2024-10-05	Draw	(Portugal) Muacir Có	X-TRA ROUND	Mataró, Spain	Decision	3	3:00
2024-04-27	Loss	(France) Guerric Billet	Fight Night One 18	Saint-Etienne, France	Decision (Unanimous)	3	3:00
2024-04-06	Loss	(France) Aymeric Lazizi	La Nuit Des Gladiateurs 15	Marseille, France	Decision (majority)	5	3:00
2024-03-02	Win	(Portugal) Rudi Mendes	NEW KUMITE RULES WORLD TOURNAMENT Golden Rise	Las Palmas, Spain	Decision (Unanimous)	1	3:00
2024-03-02	Win	(Spain) Danut Mihail	NEW KUMITE RULES WORLD TOURNAMENT Golden Rise	Las Palmas, Spain	Decision (Unanimous)	1	3:00
2024-03-02	Loss	(Spain) Alcorac Caballero	NEW KUMITE RULES WORLD TOURNAMENT Golden Rise	Las Palmas, Spain	Decision (Unanimous)	1	3:00
For La Nuit des Gladiateurs -71kg title.
2023-12-09	Loss	(France) Jonathan Mayezo	TKR 7	Bezons, France	Decision (unanimous)	3	3:00
2023-04-27	Loss	(France) Geysim Derouiche	La Nuit des Gladiateurs 14	Marseille, France	Decision (unanimous)	5	3:00
For La Nuit des Gladiateurs -72kg title.
2023-02-11	Win	(France) Majid Amarouche	UAM Fight Night K-1	Abu Dhabi, UAE	Decision (majority)	3	3:00
2022-09-30	Loss	(Romania) Sorin Căliniuc	Colosseum Tournament 35	Târgoviște, Romania	Decision (unanimous)	5	3:00
For the Colosseum Tournament World Lightweight Championship.
2022-07-02	Loss	(France) Kevin Yapi	Le Choc des Best Fighters 6	Asnières-sur-Seine, France	Decision (split)	5	3:00
Lost the WAKO-PRO European −71.8 kg/158.2 lb Championship.
2022-04-30	Win	(Italy) Mario Andrea Nani	Fight For Glory Gold Edition	Malgrat de Mar, Spain	KO (punches)	4	1:02
Won the WAKO-PRO European −71.8 kg/158.2 lb Championship.
2021-11-20	Win	(France) Guerric Billet	Nuit Des Champions 28	Marseille, France	Decision (unanimous)	3	3:00
2021-07-10	Win	(France) Christian Berthely	Villejuif Boxing Show 3	Villejuif, France	Decision (majority)	5	3:00
Defended the WKN World Super Welterweight Championship.
2019-10-19	Win	(Spain) Rubén González	Storm Series	Madrid, Spain	KO (punch)	2	0:34
2019-05-25	Win	(Slovakia) Štefan Mészáros	Trophée de l’Éphèbe de Kickboxing 16	Agde, France	TKO (leg injury)	1	1:43
Won the WKN World Super Welterweight Championship.
2019-03-30	Draw	(France) Mickael Pignolo	Boxing Fighters System	Nîmes, France	Decision	3	3:00
2019-01-07	Win	(United Kingdom) Andy Carter	Armados y Peligrosos	Montgat, Spain	Decision (unanimous)	4	2:00
2018-11-10	Draw	(Spain) Nelson Buale Choni	World Fight Tour 9	Barcelona, Spain	Decision	3	3:00
2018-07-18	Win	(Spain) Otmun el Akracu	Stars Fight Night	Badalona, Spain	TKO (punches)	2	0:46
Won the OMKE Catalonia −70.0 kg/154.3 lb Championship.
2018-06-16	Win	(Spain) Kevin Valderas	Iron Fighters 4	Castelldefels, Spain	KO (punch)	3	1:48
2017-11-30	Win	(Spain) Rubén Semper	Time to Fight 2	Spain	Decision (unanimous)	3	3:00
2016-10-16	Loss	(Argentina) Diego Agustín Soriano	Lords of the Ring	Lloret de Mar, Spain	TKO (referee stoppage)	3	2:37
Legend: Win Loss Draw/No contest Notes

Amateur Kickboxing record
Date	Result	Opponent	Event	Location	Method	Round	Time
2025-11-29	Win	(Israel) Osaid Jodah	2025 WAKO World Championship, Final	Abu Dhabi, UAE	Decision (3:0)	3	2:00
Won 2025 WAKO World Championships K-1 -75kg Gold Medal.
2025-11-28	Win	(United Arab Emirates) Mohamed Abdelaziz	2025 WAKO World Championship, Semifinals	Abu Dhabi, UAE	Decision (3:0)	3	2:00
2025-11-27	Win	(Uzbekistan) Davlatbek Rayimjonov	2025 WAKO World Championship, Quarterfinals	Abu Dhabi, UAE	Decision (3:0)	3	2:00
2025-11-25	Win	(Canada) Hady Ghoneim	2025 WAKO World Championship, Second Round	Abu Dhabi, UAE	Decision (3:0)	3	2:00
2025-11-24	Win	(Kazakhstan) Meirzhan Zekenov	2025 WAKO World Championship, First Round	Abu Dhabi, UAE	Decision (3:0)	3	2:00
2024-11-04	Loss	(Portugal) Basso Pires	2024 WAKO European Championships, First Round	Athens, Greece	Decision (3:0)	3	2:00
2023-11-22	Loss	(Ukraine) Pavlo Mykhailytsia	2023 WAKO World Championship, Semifinals	Albufeira, Portugal	Decision	3	2:00
Won 2023 WAKO World Championships K-1 -75kg Bronze Medal.
2023-11-21	Win	(Azerbaijan) Elkhan Aliyev	2023 WAKO World Championship, Quarterfinals	Albufeira, Portugal	Decision (2:1)	3	2:00
2023-11-20	Win	(Greece) Theofilos Parotsidis	2023 WAKO World Championship, Tournament Second Round	Albufeira, Portugal	Decision (3:0)	3	2:00
2022-11-	Loss	(Bulgaria) Ali Yuzeir	2022 WAKO European Championships, Semi-finals	Antalya, Turkey	Decision (3:0)	3	2:00
Won 2022 WAKO European Championships K-1 -75kg Bronze Medal.
2022-11-	Win	(Slovenia) Ziga Pecnik	2022 WAKO European Championships, Quarter Finals	Antalya, Turkey	Decision (3:0)	3	2:00
2022-11-	Win	(Croatia) Petar Musura	2022 WAKO European Championships, First Round	Antalya, Turkey	Decision (3:0)	3	2:00
2022-04-02	Win	(United States) Chris Lalone	WAKO: Team USA vs Team Spain	Oak Grove, Kentucky, United States	KO (knee to the body)	2	1:35
2021-10-	Loss	(Italy) Alessio Zeloni	2021 WAKO World Championships, 1/8 Finals	Jesolo, Italy	Decision (3:0)	3	2:00
2021-10-	Win	(Kazakhstan) Serikbolsyn Bodauov	2021 WAKO World Championships, First Round	Jesolo, Italy	Decision (2:1)	3	2:00
Legend: Win Loss Draw/No contest Notes

== See also ==
- List of male kickboxers
