= Bruce Codron =

French kickboxer

- Born: April 14, 1983 (age 43); France
- Nationality: (France) French
- Height: 1.73 m (5 ft 8 in)
- Weight: 70 kg (150 lb; 11 st)
- Division: Welterweight
- Style: Full-contact, kickboxing
- Fighting out of: Mazan, France
- Team: Gym Boxe Loisirs
- Trainer: David Blanc

Kickboxing record
- Total: 83
- Wins: 76
- By knockout: 39
- Losses: 6
- Draws: 1
- Last updated on: November 23, 2013

Bruce Codron (born April 14, 1983) is a French kickboxer. He is the World Kickboxing Network, International Sport Karate Association and World Association of Kickboxing Organizations World Full-Contact Champion. He is also a three time French Full-Contact Champion.

== Biography and career ==
Bruce Codron trains at Gym Boxe Loisirs in Mazan with his trainer David Blanc and fights in full-contact, kickboxing and K-1 rules.

He lost to Abdallah Mabel via third-round TKO due to doctor stoppage at Nuit des Champions in Marseille on November 24, 2012.

At La 20ème Nuit des Champions -68.5 kg/151 lb tournament in Marseille, France on November 23, 2013, Codron defeated both Cédric Castagna and Abdellah Ezbiri on points to win the title.

== Titles and accomplishments ==
- 2014 W.K.N. K1 Rules World Champion (69.900 kg)
- 2014 World GBC Tournament Champion (-70 kg)
- 2013 NDC K-1 Rules -68.5 kg Tournament Champion
- 2012 W.K.N. K1 Rules European Champion (69.900 kg)
- 2012 Urban Boxing K1 belt (-70 kg)
- 2011 W.K.N. Full-Contact World Champion (69.900 kg)
- 2011 World GBC Tour 4 men Tournament champion (69.900 kg)
- 2011 Nuit des Champions Full-Contact belt (-70 kg)
- 5x W.K.N. Full-Contact World Champion
- 3x W.A.K.O. Full-Contact World Champion
- 3x W.K.N. Full-Contact World Champion
- I.S.K.A. Full-Contact World Champion
- 3x Full-Contact French Champion
- La Nuit des Titans Tournament Champion

== Kickboxing record ==
Muay Thai record
76 wins (39 (T)KOs), 6 losses, 1 draw
Date	Result	Opponent	Event	Location	Method	Round	Time
2016-11-19	Loss	(Belarus) Chingiz Allazov	Nuit Des Champions 2016	Paris, France	KO (left high kick and punches)	4	1:04
Fight Was For WAKO Pro World title-70 kg.
2015-10-10	Win	(Japan) Akihiro Gono	World GBC Tour 9	Mazan, France	Decision	3	3:00
2014-11-22	Loss	(France) Abdellah Ezbiri	La 21ème Nuit des Champions, Semi Finals	Marseille, France	Ext. R. decision (split)	4	3:00
2014-10-04	Win	(Estonia) Mirkko Moisar	GBC - World Tour 7	Mazan, France	Decision	5	3:00
Wins W.K.N. K1 Rules World title (69.900 kg).
2014-02-15	Win	(France) Mohamed Houmer	World GBC Tour, Final	Pernes-les-Fontaines, France	Decision	3	3:00
Wins World GBC Tournament Championship.
2014-02-15	Win	(Spain) Antonio Gomez	World GBC Tour, Semi finals	Pernes-les-Fontaines, France	Decision	3	3:00
2013-11-23	Win	(France) Abdellah Ezbiri	La 20ème Nuit des Champions, Final	Marseille, France	Decision	3	
Wins NDC K-1 Rules -68.5Kg Tournament.
2013-11-23	Win	(France) Cédric Castagna	La 20ème Nuit des Champions, Semi finals	Marseille, France	Decision	3	
2012-11-24	Loss	(France) Abdallah Mabel	Nuit des Champions	Marseille, France	TKO (doctor stoppage)	3	
2012-10-13	Win	(Denmark) Mohamed El-Mir	World GBC Tour	Mazan, France	Decision	5	3:00
Wins W.K.N. K1 Rules European title (69.900 kg).
2012-05-19	Win	(France) Nizar Gallas	Urban Boxing United	Marseille, France	Decision	3	3:00
Wins "Urban Boxing" K1 belt (70.000 kg).
2012-03-17	Win	(France) Fréderic Diaz	9ème Trophée de l’Ephèbe	Agde, France	KO	2	
2012-02-25	Win	(France) Nizar Gallas	Stars Night	Vitrolles, France	Decision	3	3:00
2011-12-10	Win	(Bulgaria) Ivo Petrov	Full Night V	Agde, France	KO	2	
2011-11-12	Win	(France) Ludovic Millet	La 18ème Nuit des Champions	Marseille, France	Decision	7	2:00
Wins "Nuit des Champions" Full Contact belt (70.000 kg).
2011-10-08	Win	(Croatia) Mario Agatic	World GBC Tour, Final	Mazan, France	KO	4	
Wins W.K.N. Full-Contact World title (69.900 kg).
2011-10-08	Win	(Georgia (country)) Data Javakhia	World GBC Tour, Semi Final	Mazan, France	KO	3	
2011-05-07	Win	(Portugal) Ricardo Luiz	La 7ème Nuit des Sports de Combat	Lancy, Switzerland	TKO (referee stoppage)	6	
2011-03-19	Win	(France) Modibo Diarra	Boxe In Défi XII	Muret, France	Decision	12	2:00
Wins I.S.K.A. Full-Contact World title (66.500 kg).
2011-02-19	Win	(Serbia) Milos Vesovic	Stars Night	Vitrolles, France	KO	3	
2010-11-26	Win	(France) Cédric Castagna	La 17ème Nuit des Champions	Marseille, France	Decision	12	2:00
Retains W.K.N. Full-Contact World Super Lightweight title (66.700 kg).
2010-10-02	Win	(Republic of Ireland) Gary Hamilton	Gym Boxe Challenge 10	Mazan, France	Decision	12	2:00
Wins W.K.N. Full-Contact World Super Lightweight title (66.700 kg).
2010-02-27	Win	(France) Ibrahim Konaté	La Nuit du Punch	Dinard, France	Decision	7	2:00
2009-11-14	Draw	(France) Samir Mohamed	La 16ème Nuit des Champions	Marseille, France	Decision draw	12	2:00
Fight was for vacant W.K.N. Full-Contact World title (66.700 kg).
2009-10-17	Win	(Spain) Raul Gonzalez	Gym Boxe Challenge 9	Mazan, France	KO	2	
2008-11-29	Win	(France) Samir Berbachi	La 15ème Nuit des Champions	Marseille, France	Decision	12	2:00
Retains W.A.K.O. Full-Contact World title (69.100 kg).
2008-03-08	Win	(Italy) Mario Stassi	Power Trophy	Châteaurenard, France	TKO	6	
Retains W.A.K.O. Full-Contact World title (69.100 kg).
2007-11-03	Win	(France) Joseph Yaucat-Guendi	Gym Boxe Challenge	Mazan, France	Decision	12	2:00
Wins W.A.K.O. Full-Contact World title (69.100 kg).
2006-11-25	Win	(France) Cédric Castagna	La 13ème Nuit des Champions	Marseille, France	Decision (majority)	5	2:00
2006-03-04	Win	(Switzerland) Patrick Kinigamazi	Championnat d'Europe	Châteaurenard, France	Decision		
Retains W.K.N. Full-Contact European title (62.000 kg).
2003-11-15	Loss	(Thailand) Wannai Pongpila	La 10ème Nuit des Champions	Marseille, France	Decision	5	2:00
Legend: Win Loss Draw/no contest Notes

== See also ==
- List of male kickboxers
