= Guerric Billet =

French male kickboxer

- Born: April 30, 1996 (age 30); Le Creusot, France
- Height: 1.80 m (5 ft 11 in)
- Weight: 70 kg (150 lb; 11 st)
- Division: Lightweight
- Style: Kickboxing, Full Contact
- Stance: Orthodox
- Fighting out of: Le Creusot, France
- Team: Full Contact Creusotin
- Trainer: Séverin Perreau-Chemardin
- Years active: 2016 - present

Kickboxing record
- Total: 57
- Wins: 44
- By knockout: 18
- Losses: 12
- Draws: 1

Guerric Billet (born 30 April 1996) is a French kickboxer, currently competing in the lightweight division of Glory. He is a former ISKA World welterweight champion. He has won two French Kickboxer of the Year awards (2022, 2023).

== Kickboxing career ==
Billet made his Glory debut against Hafed Romdhane at Glory 60: Lyon on October 20, 2018. He won the fight by a third-round technical knockout.

Billet was scheduled to face Mohamed Azaab at Kick's Night on December 8, 2018. He won the fight by decision.

Billet returned to Glory to face Mickael Palandre at Glory 64: Strasbourg on March 9, 2019. He lost the fight by split decision.

Billet was scheduled to face Conan Saelens at The Pilon Fight Event on March 23, 2019. He won the fight by decision.

Billet was scheduled to face Dominiki Matusz at Tournoi Du Dragon 13 on April 13, 2019. He won the fight by decision.

Billet fought with Glory for the third time against William Goldie-Galloway at Glory 66: Paris on June 22, 2019. He won the fight by unanimous decision.

Billet made his fourth Glory appearance against Mohammed Hendouf at Glory 70: Lyon on October 26, 2019. He lost the fight by split decision.

Billet challenged Mattia Solarino for the European IPCC 72.5 kg title at Pegasus Fight on December 7, 2019. He won the fight by decision.

Billet was scheduled to face Artur Saładiak at Glory 75: Utrecht on February 29, 2020. He won the fight by unanimous decision.

Billet was scheduled to face David Ruiz for the ISKA European super welterweight title at The Pilon Fight Event on June 12, 2021. He won the fight by decision.

Billet was scheduled to fight Christian Zahe at Fight Night One on July 2, 2021. He won the fight by a first-round knockout.

Billet faced Yankuba Juwara at Gala du Phenix Muaythai 12 on July 31, 2021. He won the fight by a second-round technical knockout.

Billet was scheduled to face Itay Gershon at Glory 77: Rotterdam on January 30, 2021. The bout was later scrapped, as Gershon was unable to enter Netherlands because of Israel’s closed borders due to the COVID-19 pandemic. The fight between the two was rescheduled for Glory 78: Rotterdam, which was held on September 4, 2021. The fight was ruled a split draw.

Billet was scheduled to face Yunus Korkmaz for the vacant ISKA World Super Welterweight K-1 title at Sifight Night VIP on October 2, 2021. He won the fight by decision.

Billet was scheduled to face the WKN super welterweight champion Jordi Requejo at Nuit Des Champions 28 on November 20, 2021, in a non-title bout. He lost the fight by decision.

Billet was booked to face promotional newcomer Nordin Ben Moh at Glory 80 on March 19, 2022. He won the fight by unanimous decision.

Billet was scheduled to face Francesco Maggio at Fight Night One 10 on April 9, 2022. He won the fight by a third-round technical knockout.

Billet was scheduled to face Taras Hnatchuk in the main event of Bancho Cup on April 23, 2022. He won the fight by decision.

Billet faced Stoyan Koprivlenski at Glory 81: Ben Saddik vs. Adegbuy 2 on August 20, 2022. He lost the fight by unanimous decision.

Billet faced Alcorac Caballero for the vacant WAKO-PRO K-1 European super middleweight (-78.1 kg) title at Tiger's Fight on November 27, 2022. He won the fight by decision. At the end of the year, he was named the best French K-1 fighter of 2022 by Boxemag.

Billet faced Cihad Akipa at Glory 83 on February 11, 2023. He won the fight by split decision.

Billet faced Enriko Kehl in a lightweight title eliminator at Glory 86 on May 27, 2023. He lost the fight by unanimous decision.

Billet faced Jinku Oda for the vacant WAKO Pro Low Kick World Middleweight (75 kg) title at Tiger's Fights 6 on November 25, 2023. He won the fight by unanimous decision.

Billet faced Carlos Barbosa at Veyle Kick Event on March 30, 2024. He won the fight by unanimous decision.

Billet faced Nikolaos Papanikolaou for the interim ISKA K-1 World super welterweight title at The Pilon Fight Event on June 8, 2024. He won the fight by unanimous decision.

Billet faced Samuele De Meis in the semifinals of the Bancho Cup lightweight tournament, held on July 6, 2024. He captured the tournament title with decision wins over De Meis in the semifinal and Damien Fabregas in the final.

Billet faced Andrej Kedveš at Glory 95 on September 21, 2024.

== Championships and accomplishments ==
=== Professional ===
- World Association of Kickboxing Organizations
  - 2022 WAKO Pro K-1 European Super Middleweight (-78.1 kg) Champion
    - One successful title defense
  - 2023 WAKO Pro Low Kick World Middleweight (-75 kg) Champion
    - One successful title defense
- International Sport Karate Association
  - 2021 ISKA K-1 World Super Welterweight Championship
  - 2021 ISKA K-1 European Super Welterweight Championship
  - 2024 interim ISKA Low Kick World Super Welterweight Championship
  - 2025 ISKA Oriental Rules World Super Welterweight Championship
- International Professional Combat Council
  - 2019 IPCC 72.5 kg European Championship

=== Amateur ===
- Fédération française de kick boxing, muay thaï et disciplines associées
  - 2017 FFKMDA Kickboxing A-class -75 kg runner-up
  - 2017 FFKMDA Full Contact A-class -75 kg Champion
  - 2018 FFKMDA Full Contact A-class -75 kg Champion
  - 2018 FFKMDA Kickboxing A-class -75 kg Champion
  - 2018 FFKMDA K-1 A-class -75 kg Champion
- World Association of Kickboxing Organizations
  - (gold) 2018 Bestfighter WAKO World Cup (-71 kg)

== Fight record ==
Professional kickboxing record
44 wins (18 (T)KOs), 12 losses, 1 draw, 0 no contests
Date	Result	Opponent	Event	Location	Method	Round	Time
2026-12-05		(Thailand) Wutthichai Hansana	K-1 Fighting Network in France 2026 - MAX Qualifier Tournament, Semifinals	Dijon, France			
2026-09-19	Win	(Italy) Davide Lombardi	Pure Ascension	Milan, Italy	Decision (unanimous)	3	3:00
2026-08-08	Loss	(France) Jonathan Mayezo	The French Clash	La Londe-les-Maures, France	Decision (unanimous)	3	3:00
2025-11-29	Win	(France) Valentin Bon-Mardion	Tiger's Fight X	Dijon, France	Decision (unanimous)	5	3:00
Defends the WAKO Pro Low Kick World Middleweight (75kg) title.
2025-07-12	Loss	(Brazil) Bruno Gazani	Senshi 27	Varna, Bulgaria	Decision (unanimous)	3	3:00
2025-05-17	Win	(Romania) Valentin Mavrodin	Veyle Kick Event	Saint-Jean-sur-Veyle, France	KO (calf kick)	5	1:42
Won the ISKA World Super Welterweight Oriental Rules Championship.
2025-02-15	Loss	(France) Geysim Derouiche	Stars Night 2025	Vitrolles, France	Decision	3	3:00
2024-12-26	Loss	(Japan) Kaito	Shoot Boxing Battle Summit: Ground Zero Tokyo 2024	Tokyo, Japan	Decision (unanimous)	3	3:00
2024-11-30	Win	(Azerbaijan) Elkhan Aliyev	Tiger's Fight 8	Dijon, France	Decision (unanimous)	5	3:00
Defends the WAKO Pro Low Kick World Middleweight (75kg) title.
2024-09-21	Loss	(Croatia) Andrej Kedveš	Glory 95	Zagreb, Croatia	TKO (3 knockdowns/low kicks)	3	1:42
2024-07-06	Win	(France) Damien Fabregas	Bancho Cup 2, Final	Thurins, France	Decision	3	3:00
2024-07-06	Win	(Switzerland) Samuele De Meis	Bancho Cup 2, Semifinals	Thurins, France	Decision	3	3:00
2024-06-08	Win	(Greece) Nikolaos Papanikolaou	The Pilon Fight Event	Le Creusot, France	Decision (unanimous)	5	3:00
Wins the interim ISKA Low Kick World super welterweight title.
2024-04-27	Win	(Spain) Jordi Requejo	Fight Night One 18	Saint-Etienne, France	Decision (unanimous)	3	3:00
2024-03-30	Win	(Brazil) Carlos Barbosa	Veyle Kick Event	Crottet, France	Decision (unanimous)	3	3:00
2023-11-25	Win	(Japan) Jinku Oda	Tiger's Fights 6	Dijon, France	Decision (unanimous)	5	3:00
Wins the vacant WAKO Pro Low Kick World Middleweight (75kg) title.
2023-05-27	Loss	(Germany) Enriko Kehl	Glory 86	Essen, Germany	Decision (unanimous)	3	3:00
Glory Lightweight title eliminator.
2023-02-11	Win	(Germany) Cihad Akipa	Glory 83	Essen, Germany	Decision (split)	3	3:00
2022-11-27	Win	(Spain) Alcorac Caballero	Tiger's Fight	Dijon, France	Decision (unanimous)	5	3:00
Wins the vacant WAKO-PRO K-1 European super middleweight (-78.1kg) title.
2022-08-20	Loss	(Bulgaria) Stoyan Koprivlenski	Glory 81: Ben Saddik vs. Adegbuyi 2	Düsseldorf, Germany	Decision (unanimous)	3	3:00
Glory Lightweight title eliminator.
2022-04-23	Win	(Ukraine) Taras Hnatchuk	The Bancho Cup	Thurins, France	Decision	3	3:00
2022-04-09	Win	(Italy) Francesco Maggio	Fight Night One 10	Saint-Étienne, France	TKO (corner stoppage)	3	
2022-03-19	Win	(Morocco) Nordin Ben Moh	Glory 80	Hasselt, Belgium	Decision (unanimous)	3	3:00
2021-11-20	Loss	(Spain) Jordi Requejo	Nuit Des Champions 28	Marseille, France	Decision (unanimous)	3	3:00
2021-10-02	Win	(Germany) Yunus Korkmaz	Sifight Night VIP	Troyes, France	Decision	5	3:00
Wins the ISKA K-1 World super welterweight title.
2021-09-04	Draw	(Israel) Itay Gershon	Glory 78: Rotterdam	Rotterdam, Netherlands	Draw (split)	3	3:00
2021-07-31	Win	(Spain) Yankuba Juwara	Gala du Phenix Muaythai 12	Trets, France	TKO (corner stoppage/low kick)	2	
2021-07-02	Win	(Italy) Christian Zahe	Fight Night One	Saint-Étienne, France	KO (straight to the body)	1	
2021-06-12	Win	(Spain) David Ruiz	The Pilon Fight Event	Le Creusot, France	Decision	5	3:00
Wins the ISKA K-1 European super welterweight title.
2020-02-29	Win	(Poland) Artur Saładiak	Glory 75: Utrecht	Utrecht, Netherlands	Decision (unanimous)	3	3:00
2019-12-07	Win	(Italy) Mattia Solarino	Pegasus Fight	Morges, Switzerland	Decision	5	3:00
Wins the IPCC European super welterweight title.
2019-10-26	Loss	(Morocco) Mohammed Hendouf	Glory 70: Lyon	Lyon, France	Decision (split)	3	3:00
2019-06-22	Win	(United Kingdom) William Goldie-Galloway	Glory 66: Paris	Paris, France	Decision (unanimous)	3	3:00
2019-04-13	Win	(Poland) Dominiki Matusz	Tournoi Du Dragon 13	Saint-Yzan-de-Soudiac, France	Decision	3	3:00
2019-03-23	Win	(Belgium) Conan Saelens	The Pilon Fight Event	Le Creusot, France	Decision	3	3:00
2019-03-09	Loss	(France) Mickael Palandre	Glory 64: Strasbourg	Strasbourg, France	Decision (split)	3	3:00
2018-12-08	Win	(France) Mohamed Azaab	Kick's Night	Agde, France	Decision	3	3:00
2018-10-20	Win	(France) Hafed Romdhane	Glory 60: Lyon	Lyon, France	TKO (punches)	3	1:42
2018-06-09	Win	(France) Nicolas Clément	La Nuit de l'Impact IV	Saintes, France	Decision	3	2:00
2018-04-07	Win	(France) Benjamin Boutet	Tournoi du Dragon 12	Saint-Yzan-de-Soudiac, France	Decision	3	2:00
2017-12-09	Win	(France) Alexandre Paris	Kick's Night 2017	Agde, France	Decision	3	2:00
2017-07-07	Win	(France)	La Nuit des Gladiateurs V	Vernoux-en-Vivarais, France	Decision	3	2:00
2017-05-20	Win	(France)	La Nuit de l'Impact III	Saintes, France	Decision	3	2:00
2016-11-19	Win	(France) Nicolas Chaussiere	Pilon Fight Event	Le Creusot, France	Decision	3	3:00
Legend: Win Loss Draw/no contest Notes

Amateur kickboxing record
16 wins (11 (T)KOs), 1 loss
Date	Result	Opponent	Event	Location	Method	Round	Time
2018-06-16	Win	(Bulgaria) Daniel Getsov	Bestfighter Wako World Cup, Final	Rimini, Italy	Decision		
Wins the 2018 -71 kg Bestfighter Wako World Cup.
2018-06-15	Win	(Poland) Mateusz Nizejewski	Bestfighter Wako World Cup, Semi Final	Rimini, Italy	Decision		
Legend: Win Loss Draw/no contest Notes

== See also ==
- List of male kickboxers
