= Abdellah Ezbiri =

French kickboxer

- Born: September 28, 1986 (age 40); Lyon, France
- Nationality: France
- Height: 1.78 m (5 ft 10 in)
- Weight: 67 kg (148 lb; 10.6 st)
- Division: Welterweight
- Style: Kickboxing
- Fighting out of: Lyon, France
- Team: Team Ezbiri - Fighters 69
- Trainer: Fouad Ezbiri

Kickboxing record
- Total: 60
- Wins: 46
- By knockout: 14
- Losses: 13
- By knockout: 6
- Draws: 1

Other information
- Website: fouadezbiri.com
- Last updated on: November 23, 2013

Abdellah Ezbiri (born September 28, 1986) is a French kickboxer. He is the former I.S.K.A. K-1 Rules World Champion and W.K.N. K-1 Rules European Super Lightweight Champion. As of 1 November 2018, he is ranked the #7 featherweight in the world by Combat Press.

== Biography and career ==
Abdellah Ezbiri is a professional kickboxer and member of the France kickboxing team. He has received various titles such as Champion of France (three times), and he is a European and World champion in the discipline. He trains at Team Ezbiri, Fighters 69 in Lyon, with his trainer and brother Fouad Ezbiri.

On May 7, 2011, at Fight Zone 5, Abdellah became W.K.N. K-1 Rules European Super Lightweight champion Under 65 kg after beating the Italian Salvatore Zappulla by KO in the 3rd round.

On April 14, 2012, he fought to a draw against Samir "Petit Prince" Mohamed by decision at Fight Zone 6.

He competed in the Glory 8: Tokyo - 2013 65kg Slam in Tokyo, Japan on May 3, 2013, losing to Gabriel Varga via unanimous decision in the quarter-finals.

At La 20ème Nuit des Champions -68.5 kg/151 lb tournament in Marseille, France on November 23, 2013, Ezbiri defeated Charles François on points in the semi-finals before losing to Bruce Codron in the final by the same margin.

== Titles and accomplishments ==
- Professional:
  - 2017 Nuit De Champions K-1 Rules Champion (66.000 kg)
  - 2017 Glory Featherweight Contender Tournament winner
  - 2017 I.S.K.A. 67 kg World Title
  - 2016 Kunlun Fight 65 kg Tournament runner-up
  - 2014 NDC K-1 Rules -70 kg Tournament runner-up
  - 2013 NDC K-1 Rules -68.5 kg Tournament runner-up
  - 2013 I.S.K.A. K-1 Rules World Welterweight Champion (67.000 kg)
  - 2013 Krush Grand Prix Tournament Runner-Up (67.000 kg)
  - 2012 Nuit des Champions Kickboxing K-1 Rules belt (67.000 kg)
  - 2011 F-1 World MAX Tournament Champion (65.000 kg)
  - 2011 W.K.N. K-1 Rules European Super Lightweight Champion (66.700 kg)
  - 2009 F.F.S.C. Kickboxing K-1 Rules French Champion (67.000 kg)
  - 2008 Kickboxing K-1 Rules French Champion
  - 2007 F.F.K.B. Kickboxing K-1 Rules French Champion Class B
- Amateur:
  - 2010 SportAccord World Combat Games Kick-Boxing - Low-Kick, Beijing, China (bronze) (-67 kg)
  - 2009 W.A.K.O. World Kick-Boxing Championships - Low-Kick, Villach, Austria (bronze) (-67 kg)

== Kickboxing record ==
Kickboxing record
46 wins, 14 losses, 1 draw
Date	Result	Opponent	Event	Location	Method	Round	Time
2019-10-26	Loss	(Netherlands) Zakaria Zouggary	Glory 70: Lyon	Lyon, France	KO (punches)	1	2:25
2019-03-09	Loss	(Uzbekistan) Anvar Boynazarov	Glory 64: Strasbourg	Strasbourg, France	Decision (unanimous)	3	3:00
2018-10-20	Win	(France) Victor Pinto	Glory 60: Lyon	Lyon, France	KO (spinning back kick)	1	1:03
2018-05-12	Loss	(Thailand) Petpanomrung Kiatmuu9	Glory 53: Lille	Lille, France	KO (left high kick)	2	
2017-11-25	Win	(Japan) Masaaki Noiri	Nuit Des Champions 2017	Marseille, France	Decision	5	3:00
Wins the La Nuit De Champions -66kg Belt.
2017-10-28	Win	(Uzbekistan) Anvar Boynazarov	Glory 47: Lyon	Lyon, France	Decision	3	3:00
Wins the Glory Featherweight Contender Tournament Final.
2017-10-28	Win	(Morocco) Azize Hlali	Glory 47: Lyon	Lyon, France	Decision	3	3:00
Featherweight Contender Tournament, Semi-finals.
2017-09-04	Win	(Belgium) Mohamed Hendouf	Tiger Night	Switzerland	Decision	3	3:00
2017-02-18	Win	(France) Giovanni Boyer	La Nuit Des Champions	France	Decision	3	3:00
Won I.S.K.A. 67 kg World Title.
2016-09-10	Loss	(China) Wei Ninghui	Kunlun Fight 51 - 65 kg 2016 Tournament Final	Fuzhou, China	TKO (low kick)	1	
For Kunlun Fight 65 kg 2016 tournament title.
2016-09-10	Win	(Netherlands) Buray Bozaryilmaz	Kunlun Fight 51 - 65 kg 2016 Tournament Semi-final	Fuzhou, China	Decision	3	3:00
2016-09-10	Win	(South Korea) Kim Minsoo	Kunlun Fight 51 - 65 kg 2016 Tournament Quarter-finals	Fuzhou, China	Decision	3	3:00
2016-07-30	Win	(Spain) Isaac Araya	Kunlun Fight 48 - 65 kg 2016 Tournament 1/8 Finals	Jining, China	Decision	3	3:00
2016-04-08	Win	(Italy) Nicola Sanzione	Fight Night 1	Saint-Étienne, France	Decision	3	3:00
2016-01-16	Win	(France) Modibo Diarra	Nuit des Champions	Marseille, France	Decision	3	3:00
2015-11-14	Win	(France) Édouard Bernadou	Nuit des Champions	Marseille, France	Decision	3	3:00
2015-07-18	Loss	(France) Rachid Magmadi	Partouche Kickboxing Tour	France	KO	1	
2015-07-18	Win	(France) Tarek Guermoudi	Partouche Kickboxing Tour	France	KO	3	
2015-05-16	Win	(France) Johan Labbe	La 21ème Nuit des Champions	France	Decision (split)	3	3:00
2014-11-22	Loss	(Thailand) Sitthichai Sitsongpeenong	La 21ème Nuit des Champions, Final	Marseille, France	TKO (low kick)	2	
For NDC K-1 Rules -70 kg Tournament Title.
2014-11-22	Win	(France) Bruce Codron	La 21ème Nuit des Champions, Semi-finals	Marseille, France	Ext. R. decision (split)	4	3:00
2014-10-05	Loss	(Japan) Keita Makihira	Krush.46	Marseille, France	Decision (unanimous)	3	3:00
For the Krush -67kg title.
2013-11-23	Loss	(France) Bruce Codron	La 20ème Nuit des Champions, Final	Marseille, France	Decision	3	3:00
For NDC K-1 Rules -68.5Kg Tournament.
2013-11-23	Win	(France) Charles François	La 20ème Nuit des Champions, Semi-finals	Marseille, France	Decision	3	3:00
2013-05-03	Loss	(Canada) Gabriel Varga	Glory 8: Tokyo	Tokyo, Japan	Decision (unanimous)	3	3:00
65 kg Slam Tournament, Quarter-finals .
2013-04-06	Win	(Sweden) Kittisak Noiwibon	Fightzone 7	Villeurbanne, France	Decision	5	3:00
Wins I.S.K.A. K-1 Rules World Welterweight title (67.000 kg).
2013-01-14	Loss	(Japan) Yuta Kubo	Krush Grand Prix 2013 ~67 kg Tournament~, Final	Tokyo, Japan	Extension round decision (unanimous)	5	3:00
Fight was for the Krush Grand Prix 2013 ~67 kg Tournament~ title and the Krush 67 kg Championship.
2013-01-14	Win	(Japan) Yuya Yamamoto	Krush Grand Prix 2013 ~67 kg Tournament~, Semi-finals	Tokyo, Japan	Extension round decision (split)	4	3:00
2013-01-14	Win	(Japan) Yūji Nashiro	Krush Grand Prix 2013 ~67 kg Tournament~, Quarter-finals	Tokyo, Japan	Decision (unanimous)	3	3:00
2012-11-24	Win	(France) Samir Mohamed	Nuit des Champions	Marseille, France	Decision	3	3:00
Wins "Nuit des Champions" Kickboxing K-1 Rules belt (67.000 kg).
2012-06-08	Loss	(Japan) Yuta Kubo	Krush.19	Tokyo, Japan	Decision	3	3:00
2012-04-14	Draw	(France) Samir Mohamed	Fightzone 6	Villeurbanne, France	Decision draw	5	2:00
2011-10-01	Win	(France) Loris Audoui	F-1 World MAX Tournament, Final	Meyreuil, France	Decision	3	2:00
Wins F-1 World MAX Tournament title (65.000 kg).
2011-10-01	Win	(France) Vang Moua	F-1 World MAX Tournament, Semi-finals	Meyreuil, France	Decision	3	2:00
2011-10-01	Win	(France) Tristan Benard	F-1 World MAX Tournament, Quarter-finals	Meyreuil, France	Decision	3	2:00
2011-05-07	Win	(Italy) Filippo Soleid	Fightzone 5	Villeurbanne, France	KO	3	
Wins W.K.N. K-1 Rules European Super Lightweight title (66.700 kg).
2011-01-22	Win	(Turkey) Tekin Ergun	Kickboxing Gala	Strasbourg, France	Decision	5	3:00
2010-12-18	Loss	(Romania) Miodrag Olar	Kickboxing Tournament	La Ciotat, France	Decision	3	2:00
2010-09-10	Win	(Montenegro) Milan Jovanovic	SportAccord	Beijing, China	Decision (3–0)	3	2:00
Wins SportAccord Combat Games Kick-Boxing - Low-Kick 67kg bronze medal.
2010-09-10	Loss	(Russia) Shamil Abdulmedjidov	SportAccord World Combat Games, -67 kg, Low-Kick, Semi-finals	Beijing, China	Decision (3–0)	3	2:00
SportAccord Combat Games Kick-Boxing - Low-Kick 67kg Semi-finals.
2010-05-22	Win	(France) Olivier Surveillant	Kickboxing National Gala	Saint-Joseph, Réunion	Decision		
2010-04-24	Loss	(France) Charles François	Fightzone 4	Villeurbanne, France	Decision	5	3:00
2009-11-14	Win	(France) Geoffrey Mocci	La Nuit des Champions 2009	Marseille, France	Decision	5	3:00
2009-10-22	Win	(Ecuador) Roland Mendez	W.A.K.O. World Championships, LK men -67 kg, 1/8 Final	Villach, Austria	Decision (2–1)	3	2:00
2009-10-22	Win	(Hungary) Simon Laszlo	W.A.K.O. World Championships, LK men -67 kg, 1/16 Final	Villach, Austria	Decision (3–0)	3	2:00
2009-06-26	Win	(France) Vang Moua	Gala International Multi-Boxes	Paris, France	Decision	3	3:00
2009-05-23	Loss	(France) Ismaël Doumbia	Shock Muay 2	Saint-Denis, France	TKO		
2009-04-25	Win	(France) Vang Moua	F.F.S.C.D.A. French Championships	Paris, France	Decision	5	2:00
Wins F.F.S.C.D.A. Kickboxing K-1 Rules French title (67.000 kg).
2009-03-01	Win	(France) Nizar Gallas	F.F.S.C.D.A. French Championships, 1/4 Final	France	Decision		
2008-11-15	Loss	(France) Max Dansan	VXS 1	Apt, France	KO	2	
2008-04-26	Win	(France) Lyess Maroc	Fight Zone 2	Villeurbanne, France	KO		
Legend: Win Loss Draw/no contest Notes

== See also ==
- List of male kickboxers
