= Mohamed Hendouf =

Belgian-Moroccan Muay Thai fighter

- Born: Mohamed Hendouf; 15 June 1990 (age 36); Berkane, Morocco
- Nickname: Queensbury
- Nationality: Belgian; Moroccan
- Height: 1.80 m (5 ft 11 in)
- Weight: 70 kg (150 lb; 11 st)
- Style: Kickboxing
- Fighting out of: Brussels, Belgium
- Team: Queensbury Gym
- Trainer: Samir Mahjoubi

Kickboxing record
- Total: 49
- Wins: 38
- By knockout: 9
- Losses: 10
- By knockout: 0
- Draws: 1
- Last updated on: 20 April 2021

Mohamed Hendouf (born 15 June 1990) is a Belgian-Moroccan kickboxer, currently competing in the lightweight division of Glory.

== Biography and career ==
=== Early career ===
Hendouf started Kickboxing at 20 years old and became pro only two years later in August 2013 winning his debut fight with an impressive high kick knockout against Soufiane Mouelhi.

Hendouf faced Olivier Lagarigue at the 21 January 2017 La Nuit Des Gladiateurs event, in his first fight of the year. He won the fight by decision. Hendouf next faced the two-weight WAKO world champion Chingiz Allazov at Victory – ACB KB9: Showdown in Paris on 25 March 2017. He lost the fight by unanimous decision. Hendouf faced Bilal Loukili at La Nuit Des Titans 4 on 13 May 2017, in his third fight of the year. He won the fight by decision. Hendouf faced Abdellah Ezbiri at Tiger Night on 4 September 2017. He lost the fight by decision.

Hendouf made his Glory of Heroes debut against Han Wenbao at Glory of Heroes: Chengdu on 6 January 2018. He won the fight by decision. Hendouf was then booked to face Tie Yinghua for the vacant Glory of Heroes]-67 kg title at Glory of Heroes: Guangzhou on 13 January 2018. He lost the fight by decision, after an extra round was fought.

After failing to capture the Glory of Heroes title, Hendouf returned to the French kickboxing circuit, where he first faced Sayfullah Khambakhadov at the 17 March 2018, La Nuit Des Titans event. He won the fight by decision. Hendouf was next booked to face Charles Francois at The Main Event 6 on 30 March 2018. He won the fight by a first-round knockout. Hendouf extended his winning streak to four fights with decision victories against Yvan Naccari at Le Choc Des Gladiateurs on 22 July 2018 and Andrei Ostrovanu at World Fighting League on 22 September 2018.

Hendouf was booked to fight a rematch with Chingiz Allazov for the NDC lightweight title at 24 November 2018 Nuit Des Champions event. He lost the fight by unanimous decision.

Hendouf took part in the 2018 TKR lightweight tournament. He faced Wilson Varela in the semifinal bout of the one-day tournament, which took place on 22 December 2018. Hendouf won the fight by split decision and advanced to the tournament finals, where he faced Mathieu Tavares. Hendouf beat Tavares by a second-round technical knockout.

Hendouf participated in the 2019 World Fighting League lightweight tournament, which took place on 18 February 2019. He won both his quarterfinal bout against Mohamed Soumah and semifinal bout against Younes Smaili by a first-round stoppage. These two victories earned Hendouf a place in the tournament finals, where he faced Wail Karroumi. He won the fight by decision, after an extra rounds was fought.

Hendouf was booked to face Tayfun Özcan for the inaugural Arena Fight 72 kg kickboxing title at the 6 August 2019 Arena Fight event. He lost the fight by unanimous decision.

Hendouf faced Claudio Ivaldi at Le Choc Des Gladiateurs on 20 July 2019. He won the fight by decision.

=== Glory ===
Hendouf made his Glory debut against Guerric Billet at Glory 70: Lyon on 26 October 2019. He won the fight by split decision.

Hendouf was next booked to face Bruno Gazani at Glory 75: Utrecht on 29 February 2020. He lost the fight by split decision.

Hendouf made his third Glory appearance against Robson Minotinho at Glory 78: Rotterdam on 4 September 2021. He won the fight by a third-round knockout.

== Titles and accomplishments ==
Professional

- 2015 Partouche Kickboxing Tournament Champion
- 2018 TKR Tournament Champion
- 2019 World Fighting League -70 kg Champion

== Kickboxing record ==
Muay Thai record
38 wins (9 (T)KOs), 10 losses, 1 draw
Date	Result	Opponent	Event	Location	Method	Round	Time
2022-05-22	Win	(Spain) Mikel Sortino	Alpha Fight League	Bruxelles, Belgium	Decision	3	3:00
2021-09-04	Win	(Brazil) Robson Minotinho	Glory 78: Rotterdam	Rotterdam, Netherlands	KO (left hook to the body)	3	1:30
2020-02-29	Loss	(Brazil) Bruno Gazani	Glory 75: Utrecht	Utrecht, Netherlands	Decision (split)	3	3:00
2019-10-26	Win	(France) Guerric Billet	Glory 70: Lyon	Lyon, France	Decision (split)	3	3:00
2019-07-20	Win	(Italy) Claudio Ivaldi	Le Choc Des Gladiateurs	France	Decision	3	3:00
2019-06-08	Loss	(Turkey) Tayfun Özcan	Arena Fight	France	Decision (unanimous)	5	3:00
For the Arena Fight Kickboxing Title (-72.000 kg).
2019-02-18	Win	(Netherlands) Wail Karroumi	World Fighting League, Final	Netherlands	Extra round decision	4	3:00
Wins WFL -70kg title
2019-02-18	Win	(Netherlands) Younes Smaili	World Fighting League, Semi Final	Netherlands	TKO	1	
2019-02-18	Win	(France) Mohamed Soumah	World Fighting League, Quarter Final	Netherlands	KO	1	
2018-12-22	Win	(France) Mathieu Tavares	TKR, Final	France	TKO (referee stoppage)	3	3:00
2018-12-22	Win	(Cape Verde) Wilson Varela	TKR, Semi Final	France	Decision (split)	3	3:00
2018-11-24	Loss	(Belarus) Chingiz Allazov	Nuit Des Champions	France	Decision (unanimous)	5	3:00
For the NDC -70 kg Champion.
2018-09-22	Win	(Romania) Andrei Ostrovanu	World Fighting League	France	Decision	3	3:00
2018-07-22	Win	(Italy) Yvan Naccari	Le Choc Des Gladiateurs	France	Decision	3	3:00
2018-03-30	Win	(France) Charles Francois	The Main Event 6	France	TKO	2	
2018-03-17	Win	(Russia) Sayfullah Khambakhadov	La Nuit Des Titans	France	Decision	3	3:00
2018-01-13	Loss	(China) Tie Yinghua	Glory of Heroes: Guangzhou	Guangzhou, China	Extra round decision	4	3:00
For the Glory of Heroes -67kg title
2018-01-06	Win	(China) Han Wenbao	Glory of Heroes: Chengdu	Chengdu, China	Decision	3	3:00
2017-09-23	Win	(France) Jimmy Vienot	Extreme Fight For Heroes 5	France	Decision	3	3:00
2017-09-04	Loss	(France) Abdellah Ezbiri	Tiger Night	Switzerland	Decision	3	3:00
2017-05-13	Win	(Netherlands) Bilal Loukili	La Nuit Des Titans 4	France	Decision	3	3:00
2017-03-25	Loss	(Belarus) Chingiz Allazov	Victory – ACB KB9: Showdown in Paris	Paris, France	Decision (unanimous)	3	3:00
2017-01-21	Win	(France) Olivier Lagarigue	La Nuit Des Gladiateurs	France	Decision	3	3:00
2016-12-17	Win	(China) Tie Yinghua	Rise of Heroes 5	Nanning, China	Decision (split)	3	3:00
2016-10-08	Loss	(France) Mohamed Houmer	World GBC Tour 11	France	Decision	3	3:00
2016-06-03	Win	(Spain) Antonio Gomez	Phenix Boxing Only Edition 4	France	Decision	3	3:00
2016-05-14	Draw	(France) Mohamed Diaby	La Nuit des Titans III	France	Decision	3	3:00
2016-03-26	Win	(Belgium) Eddy Blaise	Best of Fight 3	France	Decision	3	3:00
2016-03-26	Loss	(Belgium) Ceric De Kersmaeker	Test of the best	Belgium	Decision	3	3:00
2016-03-19	Win	(France) Julien Souve	The Warriors	France	Decision	3	3:00
2016-02-20	Win	(France) Aydin Tuncay	12eme Nuit des Champions	France	Decision	3	3:00
2015-12-19	Win	(Belgium) Yasin Demir	Fights At The Border	Belgium	Decision	3	3:00
2015-10-15	Loss	(France) Édouard Bernadou	Partouche Kickboxing Tour, Semi Final	France	Extra round decision	4	3:00
2015-05-09	Win	(Belgium) Majid Doudah	The Night of no Return	Belgium	Decision	3	3:00
2015-04-16	Win	(Switzerland) Christophe Pruvost	Partouche Kickboxing Tour, Final	France	Extra round decision	4	3:00
2015-04-16	Win	(Turkey) Mehmet Karabuk	Partouche Kickboxing Tour, Semi Final	France	Decision	3	3:00
2014-02-15	Loss	(France) Jérémy Ragazzacci	World GBC Tour 6	France	Decision	3	3:00
2013-06-08	Win	(France) Soufiane Mouelhi	K1 EVENTS 5	Troyes, France	KO (high kick)	3	
Legend: Win Loss Draw/no contest Notes

== See also ==
- List of male kickboxers
