= Vang Moua =

French/Chinese Hmong people kickboxer (born 1979)

- Born: 1979 (age 46–47); Paris, France
- Native name: Vang Le Hmong` Moua
- Other names: DID
- Nationality: French
- Height: 1.75 m (5 ft 9 in)
- Weight: 66.5 kg (147 lb; 10 st 7 lb)
- Division: Welterweight
- Style: Sanshou, Kickboxing, Muay Thai
- Fighting out of: Paris, France
- Team: Moua MuayThai Gym

Kickboxing record
- Total: 91
- Wins: 57
- By knockout: 18
- Losses: 32
- By knockout: 10
- Draws: 2
- Last updated on: May 19, 2018

Vang Moua (born 1979) is a French-Chinese Sanshou and Muay Thai kickboxer Hmong descent. He is a former Sanda Rules Europe Champion and France Champion many times. Moua amassed an Amateur Sanshou record of 89–10.

== Biography and career ==
Vang Moua is a pro kickboxer and member of the France team of Sanshou, he has received various titles such as Champion of France two times, and he is also a European and World champion in Sanshou. He trains at Moua Top Team in Limoges.

== Titles and accomplishments ==
- Professional:
  - Kickboxing
    - 2005 Kickboxing K-1 Rules French Champion
    - 2009 French Kickboxing Class A Champion
    - 2010 French Kickboxing Class A Champion
  - Sanshou
    - 11 times French Champion
    - 2002 European Champion
    - IKF 2002 Intercontinental Champion
- Amateur:
  - 2003 World Wushu Championships – Men's sanda, Macau, China (bronze) (-65 kg)
  - 2007 World Championship Champion

== Kickboxing and Muay Thai record ==
Professional kickboxing record
57 wins (18 KOs), 32 losses, 2 Draw
Date	Result	Opponent	Event	Location	Method	Round	Time
2018-06-09	Loss	(France) Aiman Al Radhi	La Nuit De l'Impact IV	Saintes, France	Decision	3	3:00
2018-01-06	Loss	(France) Geoffrey Vivies	Niglo Fighting Championship	La Grande-Motte, France	Decision	3	3:00
2017-12-02	Loss	(Turkey) Hasan Toy	Mix Fight Gala 23	Frankfurt, Germany	Decision	3	3:00
2017-10-19	Win	(Algeria) Kader Marouf	Partouche Kickboxing Tour	La Tour de Salvagny, France	Decision	3	3:00
2017-09-23	Win	(France) Karim Jabri	Extreme Fight For Heroes 5	Draguignan, France	KO	1	
2017-09-04	Loss	(France) Samir Mohamed	Tiger Night	Cologny, Switzerland	Decision	3	3:00
2017-06-22	Loss	(France) Yannick Reine	Triumph Fighting Tour	Paris, France	TKO	2	
2017-05-20	Loss	(Senegal) Elam Ngor	Glory of Heroes: Spain & Strikers League	Tenerife, Spain	Decision	3	3:00
2017-04-30	Loss	(France) Cedrick Peynaud	Superfight Boxing Art Tournament	Clichy, France	Decision	3	3:00
2016-12-09	Loss	(United Kingdom) Charlie Peters	Enfusion Live Abu Dhabi	Abu Dhabi, UAE	TKO	2	
2016-12-09	Win	(Morocco) Ayoub Ahmamou	Enfusion Live Abu Dhabi	Abu Dhabi, UAE	Ex.R TKO	4	
2016-11-05	Loss	(France) Cedric Castagna	Glory 35 Nice	Nice, France	Decision	3	3:00
2016-06-03	Loss	(France) Rayan Mekki	Phenix Boxing Only Edition 4	Saint-Julien-en-Genevois, France	Decision	3	3:00
2016-04-23	Loss	(France) Philippe Salmon	Simply The Boxe - Space Edition	La Penne-sur-Huveaune, France	Decision	3	3:00
2016-03-12	Loss	(France) Olivier Lagarigue	Glory 28 Paris	Paris, France	Decision	3	3:00
2016-01-30	Win	(Morocco) Mohamed Karbale	Championnat du Monde de K1	Paris, France	KO	1	
2015-07-18	Loss	(Morocco) Walid Haddad	Partouche Kickboxing Tour	Aix-en-Provence, France	KO	2	
2015-04-25	Win	(Belgium) Nabil Abou Taha	La Nuit De La Boxe Thai Et Du Full Contact	Saint Quentin, France	Decision	3	3:00
2014-06-27	Loss	(France) Crice Boussoukou	Strike Fight	Lyon, France	KO	1	
2014-06-05	Win	(France) Mohamed Jelassi	Mionnay	Mionnay, France	KO	2	
2014-05-10	Loss	(France) Johny Tancray	Boxe-Thai - Championnat d'Europe	Nice, France	Decision	3	3:00
2014-04-12	Loss	(France) Eddy Nait Slimani	Simply The Boxe	La Penne-sur-Huveaune, France	Decision	3	3:00
2014-02-01	Loss	(France) Mohamed Kariche	Shock Muay 6	Saint-Denis, France	KO	2	
2013-11-15	Loss	(France) Daniel Manzoni	Muaythai League	Paris, France	Decision	3	3:00
2013-10-11	Loss	(France) Willy Borrel	Warriors Night	Issy les moulineaux, France	KO	2	
2013-06-28	Win	(France) Cedrick Peynaud	Gala Team Carcharias	Perpignan, France	Decision	3	3:00
2013-04-27	Win	(France) Arthur Siong	Fight Night Round 1	Couzeix, France	Decision	3	3:00
2013-04-14	Loss	(France) Desty Beaubrun	WICKED ONE Tournament #2	Paris, France	Decision	3	3:00
2013-01-19	Loss	(France) Modibo Diarra	Championnat d'Europe et du Monde de K1	Meaux, France	Decision	3	3:00
2012-12-15	Loss	(France) Hafed Romdhane	Championnat du Monde K1 rules	Saint-Raphaël, France	KO	1	
2012-11-24	Loss	(France) Charles Francois	Nuit des Champions 2012	Marseille, France	Decision	3	3:00
2012-06-22	Win	(Belgium) Juan Martos	Gala Du Carcharias	Perpignan, France	Decision	3	3:00
2012-05-12	Win	(France) Brian Denis	WICKED ONE Tournament semi final	Paris, France	KO	2	
2012-05-12	Win	(France) Samir Bourhaleb	WICKED ONE Tournament quarter final	Paris, France	Ex.R Decision	4	3:00
2012-04-14	Win	(France) Murvin Babajee	Fight Zone VI	Villeurbanne, France	KO	2	
2011-10-01	Loss	(France) Abdellah Ezbiri	F-1 World Max Tournament 2011 semi final	Meyreuil, France	Decision	3	3:00
2011-10-01	Win	(France) Ibrahim Konate	F-1 World Max Tournament 2011 quarter final	Meyreuil, France	Decision	3	3:00
2011-06-25	Loss	(Albania) Hysni Beqiri	Superpro Fightnight	Bâle, Switzerland	Decision	3	3:00
2011-06-18	Win	(France) Hamid Naceur	Carcharias	Perpignan, France	KO	2	
2011-04-30	Win	(France) Kichima Yattabare	Finales Championnat de France de Kick-Boxing	Paris, France	Decision	3	3:00
2011-04-02	Win	(France) Atef Bahedi	1/2 Finales Championnat De France Kick Boxing	Strasbourg, France	Decision	3	3:00
2010-06-19	Win	(France) Mohamed El Aouaji	Finales du Championnat de France Elites de Kick-Boxing	Paris, France	TKO	3	
2009-06-26	Loss	(France) Abdellah Ezbiri	1er Gala International Multi-boxes	Paris, France	Decision	5	3:00
2009-04-25	Loss	(France) Abdellah Ezbiri	Finales du Championnat de France de Kickboxing	Paris, France	Decision	3	3:00
2008-11-08	Loss	(France) Nizar Galas	Championnat d'Europe : Peynaud VS Orrela	Paris, France	Decision	3	3:00
2008-03-08	Loss	(France) Abdellah Ezbiri	Quarts De Finale Championnat De France	Paris, France	Decision	3	3:00
Legend: Win Loss Draw/No contest Notes

== See also ==
- List of male kickboxers
