= Jonathan Mayezo =

French kickboxer (born 2000)

- Born: May 22, 2000 (age 26); Villeurbanne, France
- Nickname: K.O.
- Height: 186 cm (6 ft 1 in)
- Weight: 72 kg (159 lb; 11.3 st)
- Fighting out of: Villeurbanne, France
- Team: Team Ezbiri
- Trainer: Mohamed Houmer
- Years active: 2017- present

Kickboxing record
- Total: 44
- Wins: 30
- By knockout: 10
- Losses: 13
- By knockout: 1
- Draws: 1
- Last updated on: February 18, 2023

Jonathan Mayezo (born May 22, 2000) is a French muay thai kickboxer who is currently ranked number eight in the world in the middleweight division.

== Martial arts career ==
Mayezo took part in the 2020 Empire Fight -72 kilogram tournament, held on February 8, 2020. He won the four-man tournament, after beating Khambakhadov Saifullah by decision in the semifinal and Jérémy Antonio by decision in the final. Two weeks after capturing the tournament title, at the February 22 Stars Night event, Mayezo beat Amansio Paraschiv by decision as well.

Mayezo faced Zhora Akopyan for the Empire Fight Kickboxing lightweight title at Empire Fight - Vikings Edition on October 2, 2021. He won the fight by majority decision.

Mayezo was scheduled to face Brown Pinas for the inaugural SUPERKOMBAT World Super Lightweight Championship at Superkombat Universe: Doumbé vs. Emiev on November 1, 2021. He won the fight by split decision.

Mayezo was booked to challenge the reigning WAKO Pro world Super Welterweight (-69 kg) champion Georgian Cimpeanu at UFN 9 on April 22, 2022. He captured the title by unanimous decision.

Mayezo faced Ahmed Bouchiber at Stars Night 2022 on May 21, 2022. He lost the fight by a first-round technical knockout.

Mayezo faced Edgard Rodriguez for the WAKO Pro World Low Kick Super Welterweight (-69 kg) championships at UFN 10 on January 20, 2023. He won the fight by a fourth-round technical knockout.

Mayezo faced Chris Wunn at Glory 83 on February 11, 2023, as a short notice replacement for Mohammed Jaraya. He lost the fight by unanimous decision.

Mayezo faced Marcio Jesus at Senshi 15 on February 28, 2023. He won the fight by unanimous decision.

Mayezo faced James Condé in Glory 88 and lost by decision.

After wins over Emerson Bento and Jordi Requejo Mayezo faced Josh Hill for the WBC Muay Thai international title in 2024 and lost by decision.

In January 2025, Mayezo fought Beckham Bigwinchampiongym in the Rajadamnern World Series and won by decision.

== Championships and accomplishments ==
- Empire Fight
  - 2020 Empire Fight -72 kg Tournament Winner
  - 2021 Empire Fight -70 kg Championship
- Superkombat Fighting Championship
  - 2021 Superkombat Super Lightweight Championship
- World Association of Kickboxing Organizations
  - 2022 WAKO Pro World K-1 Super Welterweight (-69 kg) Championship
  - 2023 WAKO Pro World Low Kick Super Welterweight (-69 kg) Championship

== Fight record ==
Professional Kickboxing Record
30 Wins (10 (T)KOs), 13 Losses, 1 Draw, 0 No Contests
Date	Result	Opponent	Event	Location	Method	Round	Time
2026-10-24	Win	(Lebanon) Ibrahim Abdul-Malak	K-1 World GP 2027 -90kg in Dortmund - World Fighting League	Dortmund, Germany	Decision (Unanimous)	3	3:00
2026-08-08	Win	(France) Guerric Billet	The French Clash	La Londe-les-Maures, France	Decision (Unanimous)	3	3:00
2026-05-02	Loss	(Azerbaijan) Elkhan Aliyev	Loca Fight Club	Istanbul, Turkey	Ext.R Decision (Unanimous)	4	3:00
2025-01-11	Win	(Thailand) Beckham Bigwinchampiongym	Rajadamnern World Series	Bangkok, Thailand	Decision (Unanimous)	3	3:00
2024-05-25	Loss	(England) Josh Hill	Alliance Muay Thai League	Liverpool, England	Decision (Unanimous)	5	3:00
For the vacant WBC MuayThai International Middleweight Title .
2024-01-27	Win	(Brazil) Emerson Bento	Samui Super Fight, Phetchbuncha Stadium	Ko Samui, Thailand	Decision (Unanimous)	5	3:00
2023-12-09	Win	(Spain) Jordi Requejo	TKR 7	Bezons, France	Decision (Unanimous)	3	3:00
2023-09-09	Loss	(France) James Condé	Glory 88	Paris, France	Decision (Unanimous)	3	3:00
2023-02-18	Win	(Brazil) Marcio Jesus	Senshi 15	Varna, Bulgaria	Decision (Split)	3	3:00
2023-02-11	Loss	(Germany) Chris Wunn	Glory 83	Essen, Germany	Decision (Unanimous)	3	3:00
2023-01-20	Win	(Spain) Edgard Rodriguez	UFN 10	Brest, France	TKO	4	
Wins the WAKO Pro World Low Kick Super Welterweight (-69 kg) Championship.
2022-05-21	Loss	(France) Ahmed Bouchiber	Stars Night 2022	Vitrolles, France	TKO (Referee stoppage)	1	2:37
2022-04-22	Win	(Romania) Georgian Cîmpeanu	UFN 9	Brest, France	Decision (Unanimous)	5	3:00
Wins the WAKO Pro World K-1 Super Welterweight (-69 kg) Championship.
2021-01-11	Win	(Netherlands) Brown Pinas	Superkombat Universe: Doumbé vs. Emiev	Dubai, UAE	Decision (Split)	5	3:00
Wins the inaugural SUPERKOMBAT World Super Lightweight Championship.
2021-10-02	Win	(Armenia) Zhora Akopyan	Empire Fight - Viking Edition	Montbéliard, France	Decision (Majority)	5	3:00
Wins the Empire Fight -70 kg Championship.
2020-02-22	Win	(Romania) Amansio Paraschiv	Stars Night 2020	Vitrolles, France	Decision (Split)	3	3:00
2020-02-08	Win	(France) Jérémy Antonio	Empire Fight, Tournament Final	Montbéliard, France	Decision	5	3:00
Wins the Empire Fight -72 kg tournament title.
2020-02-08	Win	(Russia) Saifullah Khambakhadov	Empire Fight, Tournament Semifinal	Montbéliard, France	Decision	5	3:00
2019-07-12	Win	(France) Ahmed Bouchiber	Ultimate Fight Night	Montélimar, France	Decision	3	3:00
2019-11-16	Win	(Moldova) Alexandru Constantinescu	NGC	Frenkendorf, Switzerland	KO	3	
2019-10-19	Win	(France) Adam Ghaleb	Louna Boxing	Château-Arnoux-Saint-Auban, France	Decision	3	3:00
2019-09-05	Win	(Thailand) Chonlek Superpro Samui	Samui Stadium	Ko Samui, Thailand	KO	4	
2019-08-28	Win	(Iran) Mahammad Hosein	Phetchbuncha Stadium	Ko Samui, Thailand	KO	3	
2019-08-11	Win	(Thailand) Yodrachan Jackie Muaythai	Samui Stadium	Ko Samui, Thailand	Decision	5	3:00
2019-07-25	Win	(Thailand) Teerapong Sitkorayuth	Samui Stadium	Ko Samui, Thailand	KO	3	
2019-07-11	Win	(Thailand) Avatan Kiat Udon	Samui Stadium	Ko Samui, Thailand	KO	2	
2019-06-01	Win	(Czech Republic) Filip Hucin	La Nuit Du KBP2	Pernes-les-Fontaines, France	TKO	3	
2019-04-27	Loss	(France) Mohamed Souane	Partouche Kickboxing Tour	Pornic, France	Decision	3	3:00
2019-04-06	Win	(France) Nasir-uddine Lahouichi	Simply The Boxe 10	Marseille, France	Decision	3	3:00
2019-03-26	Loss	(Thailand) Simanoot Sor Sarinya	Khao Lak Boxing Stadium	Phang Nga province, Thailand	Decision	5	3:00
2019-02-09	Loss	(France) Vianney Seperoumal	La Nuit Des Champions	Saint-Joseph, Réunion, France	Decision	5	3:00
2018-12-15	Loss	(France) Faouzi Djellal	Les Princes Du Ring	Tours, France	Decision	3	3:00
2018-09-22	Loss	(Switzerland) Qendrim Bajrami	Gala Muay Thai	Geneva, Switzerland	Decision	3	3:00
2018-08-25	Win	(Thailand) Suzumu Vwin	Phetchbuncha Stadium	Ko Samui, Thailand	Decision	5	3:00
2018-08-10	Loss	(Thailand) Yodrachan Jackie Muaythai	Chaweng Stadium	Ko Samui, Thailand	Decision	5	3:00
2018-07-18	Loss	(Thailand) Yodsanchai NayokATarsala	Best Of Samui	Ko Samui, Thailand	Decision	5	3:00
2018-06-09	Draw	(Switzerland) Rachan Goldrank Boxing	International Charity Fight	Winterthur, Switzerland	Decision	5	3:00
2018-04-28	Win	(Hungary) Csaba Kerek	NGC	Schlieren, Switzerland	TKO (Referee stoppage)	3	
2018-03-10	Win	(Switzerland) Massa Risti	Emil Frey Fight Night III	Martigny, Switzerland	Decision	3	
2017-08-27	Win	(Thailand)	Wanpinyo Big Fight	Ko Samui, Thailand	KO	3	
2017-08-10	Win	(Thailand) Taphet Talingam Muaythai	Wanpinyo Big Fight	Ko Samui, Thailand	KO	4	
2017-03-11	Loss	(Switzerland) Liridon Koxha	Emil Frey Fight Night I	Martigny, Switzerland	Decision	3	3:00
Legend: Win Loss Draw/No contest Notes

== See also ==
- List of male kickboxers
