= Charles François (kickboxer) =

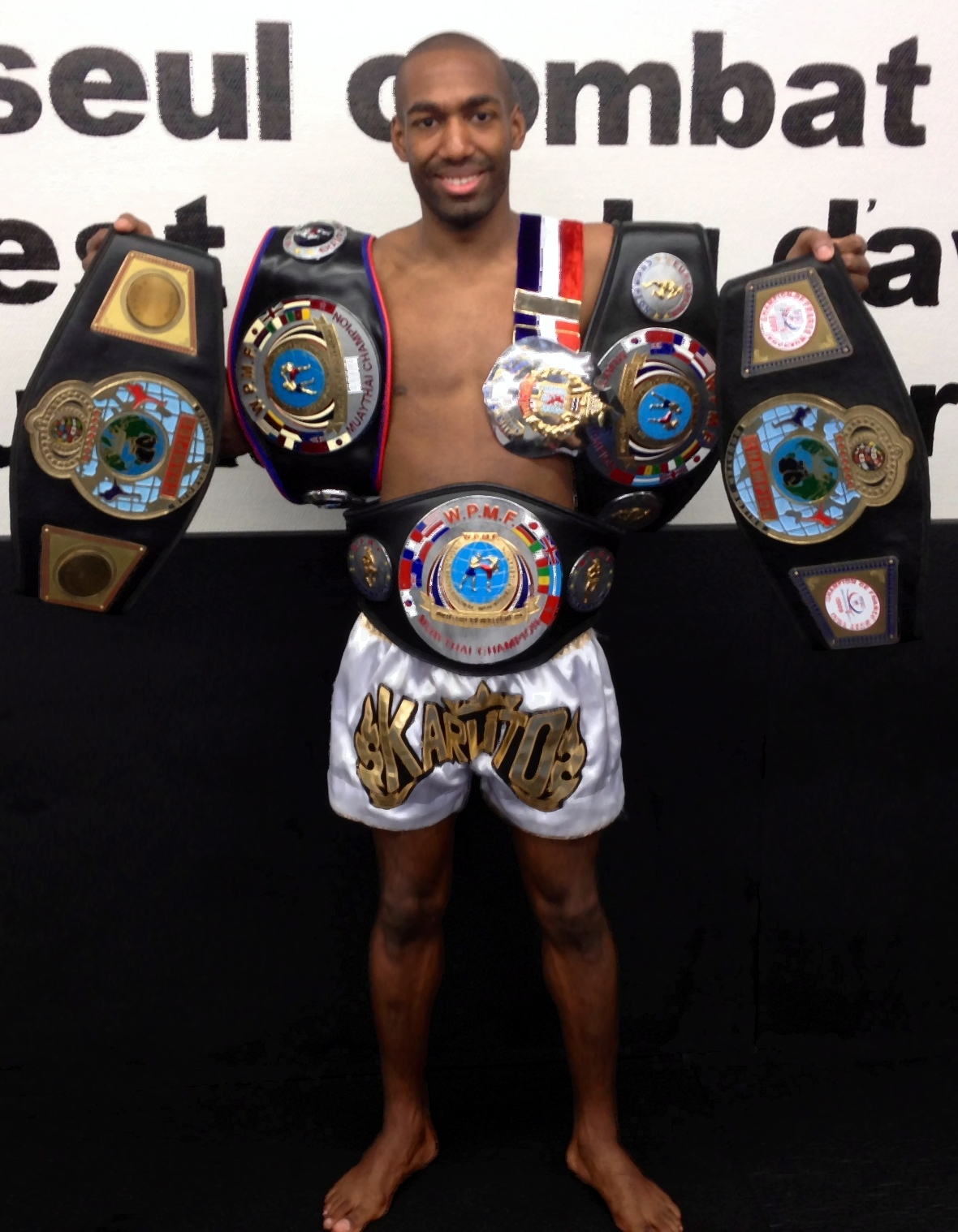
- Born: October 4, 1986 (age 40); France
- Other names: Karlito
- Nationality: (France) French
- Height: 1.79 m (5 ft 10 1/2 in)
- Weight: 65 kg (143 lb; 10.2 st)
- Division: Lightweight; Welterweight
- Style: Kickboxing, Muay Thai
- Fighting out of: Metz, France
- Team: Muaythaï Academy 57/ Team Alma Pro
- Trainer: Stéphane Leichtmann
- Years active: 10 (2001–present)

Kickboxing record
- Total: 65
- Wins: 44
- By knockout: 28
- Losses: 19
- By knockout: 7
- Draws: 2

Other information
- Occupation: personal trainer, coach sportif
- Website: www.charles-francois.com
- Last updated on: September 28, 2020

Charles François (born October 4, 1986) is a French Muay Thai kickboxer. He is the W.P.M.F. European Muaythai Champion and former W.P.M.F. World Muaythai Champion.

== Biography and career ==
Charles "Karlito" François is a pro Muaythai kickboxer and member of the France team of Muaythai. He has competed for over 10 years and has received various titles such as Champion of France six times. He is also a two-time European champion, Intercontinental champion and a world champion in the discipline. He began Muaythai at the age of 12-13 at Muaythai Academy 57 in Metz, with his trainer Stéphane Leichtmann.

On February 17, 2012, François faced Yuta Kubo for the vacant ISKA World Light-Welterweight (64.5 kg) Championship in Tokyo, Japan but lost via knockout in the second round.

He beat Vang Moua by decision at Nuit des Champions in Marseille on November 24, 2012.

He lost a split decision to Petchasawin Seatransferry at Best of Siam 3 in Paris, France, on February 14, 2013.

He was dropped in round one and lost by unanimous decision to Lee Sung-Hyun at the K-1 World Max 2013 World Championship Tournament Final 16 in Majorca, Spain on September 14, 2013.

At La 20ème Nuit des Champions -68.5 kg/151 lb tournament in Marseille, France, on November 23, 2013, François lost to Abdallah Ezbiri on points in the semi-finals.

He is expected to face Bobo Sacko at Warriors Night on April 4, 2014.

On November 15, 2014 he faced the Thai Seemanut Sor Surinya losing by knockout first round at Z1 Royal Kedah event held in Langkawi, Malaysia

Three weeks later, he won his first fight at Lumpinee Stadium by unanimous decision against F16 Sor. Sakchai.

He fought for the IPCC 148 lbs title against Nauzet Trujillo. Charles lost the fight by a unanimous decision.

Francois fought Kaiss Najm during Fight And Furious 2. The match ended in a draw.

== Titles and accomplishments ==
- Titles:
  - 2015 Emperor Chok Dee Champion -68 kg
  - 2014 K1 I.S.K.A World Champion (65.000 kg)
  - 2013 K1 I.S.K.A. Intercontinental Champion (65.000 kg)
  - 2013 Explosion Fight Night 7 K-1 Rules Tournament Champion (65.000 kg)
  - 2012 WMC World Muaythai Champion (63.500 kg)
  - 2012 European Muaythai Champion (66.680 kg)
  - 2011 W.P.M.F. Intercontinental Muaythai Champion (66.680 kg)
  - 2011 Explosion Fight Night Volume 03 Tournament runner up (65 kg)
  - 2010 W.P.M.F. World Muaythai Champion (67 kg)
  - 2010 W.P.M.F. European Muaythai Champion (67 kg)
  - 2009 French Muay Thai Class A Champion (67.500 kg)
  - 2007 French Muay Thai Class A Champion (67.500 kg)

== Kickboxing record ==
Kickboxing record
44 wins (28 (T)KOs), 19 losses, 2 draws
Date	Result	Opponent	Event	Location	Method	Round	Time
2019-04-20	Loss	(France) Kaiss Najm	Fight And Furious 2	Marly-le-Roi, France	Decision (unanimous)	3	3:00
2018-11-24	Loss	(Spain) Nauzet Trujillo	Golden K1 Tenerife	Spain	Decision (unanimous)	5	3:00
For the IPCC 148 lbs title.
2018-06-23	Win	(France) Yoann Mermoux	Burning Series 7	Bellegarde-sur-Valserine, France	Decision (unanimous)	3	3:00
2018-03-30	Loss	(Belgium) Mohamed Hendouf	The Main Event 6	Levallois-Perret, France	TKO (three knockdowns)	2	
2017-08-26	Loss	(England) Liam Harrison	Muay Thai World Class Action In The UK	United Kingdom	TKO (three knockdowns)	3	
2017-04-08	Loss	(Thailand) Por.Tor.Thor. Petchrungruang	THAI FIGHT Paris	Paris, France	Decision	3	3:00
2017-01-13	Loss	(China) Yang Zhuo	Glory of Heroes 6	Jiyuan, Henan, China	Decision	3	3:00
2016-12-10	Loss	(Armenia) Armen Petrosyan	VVWS - Venum Victory World Series	Florence, Italy	Decision	5	3:00
For the ISKA Super Welterweight (-70 kg/154 lb) Oriental Rules World Championship.
2016-05-19	Win	(Belgium) Lello Perego	Capital Fights	Paris, France	Decision	3	3:00
2016-03-06	Loss	(Lithuania) Sigitas GAIZAUSKAS	Max Muay Thai	Thailand	KO	1	3:00
2015-08-22	Loss	(Thailand) Saenchai PKSaenchaimuaythaigym	Thai Fight	Thailand	KO (punch)	2	3:00
2015-01-31	Win	(France) Hamza Rahmani	Emperor Chok Dee	Nancy, France	Decision	5	3:00
Wins Emperor Chok Dee Championship -68 kg.
2014-12-05	Win	(Thailand) F16 Sor. Sakchai	King's Birthday	Bangkok, Thaïlande	Decision	5	3:00
2014-11-15	Loss	(Thailand) Simanoot Sor Surinya	Z1 Royal Kedah	Langkawi, Malaysia	KO (elbow)	1	2:30
Fight was for Z1 International WMC World Muay Thai title (69 kg).
2014-05-24	Win	(France) Morgan Adrar	Ring's Tiger 3	Chavelot, France	Decision	5	3:00
2014-05-10	Win	(Netherlands) Sergio Wielzen	King of the Ring 3	Longeville-Lès-Metz, France	Decision	3	3:00
2014-04-19	Win	(Italy) Paolo Angelini	Kickboxing Day 6	Villanova, Italy	KO (high kick)	4	3:00
Wins Kickboxing Day 6 ~65 kg K-1 Rules Tournament~ and K1 I.S.K.A. World titles (65.000 kg).
2014-04-04	Loss	(France) Bobo Sacko	Warriors Night	Paris, France	Decision	5	3:00
2013-11-23	Loss	(France) Abdellah Ezbiri	La 20ème Nuit des Champions, Semi finals	Marseilles, France	Decision	3	3:00
2013-09-14	Loss	(South Korea) Lee Sung-Hyun	K-1 World MAX 2013 World Championship Tournament Final 16	Majorca, Spain	Decision (unanimous)	3	3:00
2013-03-16	Win	(France) Mohamed Galaoui	Explosion Fight Night 7 ~65 kg K-1 Rules Tournament~, Final	Châteauroux, France	Decision	3	3:00
Wins Explosion Fight Night 7 ~65 kg K-1 Rules Tournament~ and K1 I.S.K.A. Intercontinental titles (65.000 kg).
2013-03-16	Win	(Italy) Calogero Palmeri	Explosion Fight Night 7 ~65 kg K-1 Rules Tournament~, Semi Final	Châteauroux, France	Decision	3	3:00
2013-02-14	Loss	(Thailand) Petchasawin Seatransferry	Best of Siam 3	Paris, France	Decision (split)	5	3:00
2012-11-24	Win	(France) Vang Moua	Nuit des Champions	Marseille, France	Decision	3	3:00
2012-05-05	Win	(Thailand) Panya Kemthong	King of The Ring	Longeville-lès-Metz, France	Decision	5	3:00
Wins WMC World Muaythai title (63.500 kg).
2012-04-07	Win	(France) Kichima Yattabare	Explosion Fight Night Volume 5	Brest, France	Decision	5	2:00
2012-02-17	Loss	(Japan) Yuta Kubo	Krush.16	Tokyo, Japan	KO (punch to the body)	2	2:18
Fight was for ISKA World Light-Welterweight title (64.500 kg).
2012-02-11	Win	(Portugal) André Duarte	Kings of Muay Thai Act II	Differdange, Luxembourg	TKO (threw in the towel)	3	
Wins World Pro League European Muaythai title (66.680 kg).
2011-12-30	Loss	(Thailand) Armin Pumpanmuang	Gladiator's War	Pattaya, Thailand	Decision	5	3:00
Fight was for World Pro League Muaythai title (67 kg).
2011-12-05	Win	(China) Chang Shouy Youi	Kings Birthday	Bangkok, Thailand	Decision	5	3:00
Wins WPMF Intercontinental Muaythai title (66.680 kg).
2011-10-08	Loss	(Thailand) Sak Kaoponlek	Muaythai Premier League: Round 2	Padua, Italy	TKO (cut)	3	
2011-05-21	Loss	(Thailand) Armin Matli	Les Rois du Ring	Châlons, France	KO (left highkick)	1	
Lost his WPMF World Muaythai title (67 kg).
2011-04-02	Loss	(France) Houcine Bennoui	Explosion Fight Night Volume 03, Final	Brest, France	TKO	2	
Fight was for Explosion Fight Night Vol. 3 Muaythai Tournament (65kg).
2011-04-02	Win	(Italy) Alberto Siracusa	Explosion Fight Night Volume 03, Semi Final	Brest, France	Decision (unanimous)	3	3:00
2011-03-05	Loss	(England) Kieran Keddle	Explosion Two: Aftershock	Swanley, England	Decision (split)	5	3:00
Fight was for IKF World Muaythai title (67kg).
2010-12-04	Win	(Switzerland) Alexandre Boyancé	Thailand King's Birthday	Bangkok, Thailand	KO (right cross)	2	
Wins WPMF World Muaythai title (67 kg).
2010-10-29	Loss	(Thailand) Thanasak Top King Boxing	France vs Lumpinee	Paris, France	TKO (ankle injury)	1	
2010-09-11	Loss	(Thailand) Sak Kaoponlek	Iron Fighter	Pordenone, Italy	Decision	5	3:00
Fight was for Intercontinental Kombat League title (67kg).
2010-08-11	Win	(Thailand) Samson Sith-Ubon	Queens Birthday	Bangkok, Thailand	TKO (referee stoppage)	3	
2010-06-00	Win	(Italy) Michelle Bottai	Muaythai Gala in Epinal	Epinal, France	TKO (referee stoppage)	3	
Retains WPMF European Muaythai title (67 kg).
2010-04-24	Win	(France) Abdellah Ezbiri	Fightzone IV	Villeurbanne, France	Decision	5	3:00
2010-03-28	Win	(Thailand) Kraenkai Tor Silachai	France vs Thailand	Reims, France	Decision	5	3:00
2010-02-27	Win	(Belgium) Edgard Nzunga	Muaythai Gala in Ludres	Ludres, France	Decision	5	3:00
Wins WPMF European Muaythai title (67 kg).
2009-12-04	Win	(Japan) Isae Ingram Gym	Kings Birthday	Bangkok, Thailand	TKO (doctor stoppage)	4	
2009-08-11	Win	(Cambodia) Bird Kham	Queens Birthday	Bangkok, Thailand	TKO (knee to the liver)	5	
2009-06-11	Win	(France) Bouba Konta	French Muaythai Championship	Paris, France	Decision	5	3:00
Wins French Muaythai title (67.500 kg).
2009-05-02	Win	(Thailand) Kraenkai Tor Silachai	France vs Thailand	Epinal, France	TKO (elbow/cut)	1	
2009-01-17	Win	(France) Arezki Chayem	Les Rois du Ring	Ludres, France	TKO (gave up)	4	
2008-04-12	Loss	(France) Boubou Traore	Le choc des mondes III	Saint-Amand, France	TKO (gave up)	2	
Lost his French Muaythai title (67.500 kg).
2007-11-29	Loss	(France) Mehdi Zatout	Gala in Coubertin	Paris, France	TKO (feferee stoppage)	3	
2007-10-00	Win	(France) Boubou Traore	French Muaythai Championship	France	TKO (gave up)	3	
Wins French Muaythai title (67.500 kg).
2007-05-12	Win	(France) Boubou Traore	Muaythai Gala in Epinal	Epinal, France	TKO (feferee stoppage)	3	
2006-05-13	Win	(Albania) Jetmir Sula	Le Thaï Tournament II: France vs Thaïlande	Thônex, Switzerland	Decision	3	
Legend: Win Loss Draw/no contest Notes

== See also ==
- List of male kickboxers
