= 2026 in ONE Championship =

Mixed martial arts events

Information
- First date: January 16, 2026
- Last date: TBD

Events
- Total events: TBD
- ONE Fight Night: TBD
- ONE Friday Fights: TBD

Fights
- Total fights: TBD
- Title fights: TBD

The year 2026 is the 16th year in the history of the ONE Championship, a mixed martial arts, kickboxing, Muay Thai and submission grappling promotion based in the Cayman Islands.

== Events list ==
=== Scheduled events ===
Event	Date	Venue	City	Country	Ref.
ONE Fight Night 50	December 19, 2026	Lumpinee Boxing Stadium	Bangkok	Thailand	
ONE Samurai 6	December 2, 2026	Yokohama Buntai	Yokohama	Japan	
ONE Samurai 5	November 18, 2026	Ebara Wave Arena Ota	Tokyo	Japan	

=== Past events ===
#	Event	Date	Venue	City	Country	Performance of the Night		Bonus	Ref.
426	ONE Fight Night 49: Gabriel vs. Magomedov	November 7, 2026	Lumpinee Boxing Stadium	Bangkok	Thailand	—N/a	—N/a	No Bonuses.	
425	ONE Friday Fights 177: Isannuea vs. Jack / The Inner Circle 37	November 6, 2026	Lumpinee Boxing Stadium	Bangkok	Thailand	Tye Ruotolo	—N/a	$100,000	
425	ONE Friday Fights 177: Isannuea vs. Jack / The Inner Circle 37	November 6, 2026	Lumpinee Boxing Stadium	Bangkok	Thailand	Superball Sit Chor.	Titus Proctor	$10,000	
424	ONE Friday Fights 176: Khunsuk vs. YodUdon / The Inner Circle 36	October 30, 2026	Lumpinee Boxing Stadium	Bangkok	Thailand	Khunsuk T1.FightAcademy	Sitthichai Sor.Dechapan	$10,000	
424	ONE Friday Fights 176: Khunsuk vs. YodUdon / The Inner Circle 36	October 30, 2026	Lumpinee Boxing Stadium	Bangkok	Thailand	Adham Ruziev	Oga Akita	$10,000	
424	ONE Friday Fights 176: Khunsuk vs. YodUdon / The Inner Circle 36	October 30, 2026	Lumpinee Boxing Stadium	Bangkok	Thailand	Xavier Gonzalez	—N/a	$10,000	
423	ONE Samurai 4	October 17, 2026	Ariake Arena	Tokyo	Japan	Jonathan Haggerty	Nadaka Yoshinari	$95,000	
423	ONE Samurai 4	October 17, 2026	Ariake Arena	Tokyo	Japan	Sinsamut Klinmee	—N/a	$45,000	
423	ONE Samurai 4	October 17, 2026	Ariake Arena	Tokyo	Japan	Kota Abe	Ryoto Nishiyama	$9,500	
423	ONE Samurai 4	October 17, 2026	Ariake Arena	Tokyo	Japan	Shoma Okumura	Toki Tamaru	$9,500	
423	ONE Samurai 4	October 17, 2026	Ariake Arena	Tokyo	Japan	Masaki Takeura	—N/a	$9,500	
422	ONE Friday Fights 175: Lamsing vs. Rhenimi / The Inner Circle 35	October 16, 2026	Lumpinee Boxing Stadium	Bangkok	Thailand	Abdessamie Rhenimi	Mahesuan Aekmuangnon	$10,000	
422	ONE Friday Fights 175: Lamsing vs. Rhenimi / The Inner Circle 35	October 16, 2026	Lumpinee Boxing Stadium	Bangkok	Thailand	Slatan Jitmuangnon	Tepatip Champkhaomootod	$10,000	
422	ONE Friday Fights 175: Lamsing vs. Rhenimi / The Inner Circle 35	October 16, 2026	Lumpinee Boxing Stadium	Bangkok	Thailand	Shosuke Iwanaga	Olivia Bahsous	$10,000	
421	ONE Friday Fights 174: Dedduanglek vs. Mongkoldetlek / The Inner Circle 34	October 9, 2026	Lumpinee Boxing Stadium	Bangkok	Thailand	Dedduanglek Torfunfarm	Petmanee P.K.SiamaxMP.Service	$10,000	
421	ONE Friday Fights 174: Dedduanglek vs. Mongkoldetlek / The Inner Circle 34	October 9, 2026	Lumpinee Boxing Stadium	Bangkok	Thailand	PetUbon Sor.Tienchai	Yodthewin Mor. Rajabhatmubanchombueng	$10,000	
420	ONE Fight Night 48: Erdogan vs. Elliott	October 3, 2026	Lumpinee Boxing Stadium	Bangkok	Thailand	Shamil Erdogan	—N/a	$50,000	
419	ONE Friday Fights 173: Tonglampoon vs. Tobias / The Inner Circle 33	October 2, 2026	Lumpinee Boxing Stadium	Bangkok	Thailand	Cal Cook	Dzhamil Osmanov	$10,000	
419	ONE Friday Fights 173: Tonglampoon vs. Tobias / The Inner Circle 33	October 2, 2026	Lumpinee Boxing Stadium	Bangkok	Thailand	Sheila Barrios	—N/a	$10,000	
418	ONE Friday Fights 172: Supalek vs. Rhouni / The Inner Circle 32	September 25, 2026	Lumpinee Boxing Stadium	Bangkok	Thailand	Teeyai Torfunfarm	Nuapayak Jitmuangnon	$20,000	
418	ONE Friday Fights 172: Supalek vs. Rhouni / The Inner Circle 32	September 25, 2026	Lumpinee Boxing Stadium	Bangkok	Thailand	Ma Zhenzhao	Konstantin Shakhtarin	$10,000	
417	ONE Friday Fights 171: Klarob vs. Sornsueknoi / The Inner Circle 31	September 18, 2026	Lumpinee Boxing Stadium	Bangkok	Thailand	Alex Usieto	—N/a	$10,000	
416	ONE Samurai 3	September 12, 2026	Yokohama Buntai	Yokohama	Japan	Yuya Wakamatsu	—N/a	$45,000	
416	ONE Samurai 3	September 12, 2026	Yokohama Buntai	Yokohama	Japan	Ryuya Okuwaki	Shimon Yoshinari	$30,000	
416	ONE Samurai 3	September 12, 2026	Yokohama Buntai	Yokohama	Japan	Seiichiro Ito	Homura Abe	$9,500	
416	ONE Samurai 3	September 12, 2026	Yokohama Buntai	Yokohama	Japan	Yuki Tanaka	—N/a	$9,500	
415	ONE Friday Fights 170: Yodlekpet vs. Pompet 3 / The Inner Circle 30	September 11, 2026	Lumpinee Boxing Stadium	Bangkok	Thailand	Muangthai P.K.Saenchai	—N/a	$10,000	
414	ONE Fight Night 47: Stamp vs. Flores	September 5, 2026	Lumpinee Boxing Stadium	Bangkok	Thailand	Paweł Jaworski	—N/a	$50,000	
413	ONE Friday Fights 169: Khunponnoi vs. Sunvo / The Inner Circle 29	September 4, 2026	Lumpinee Boxing Stadium	Bangkok	Thailand	Arman Moradi	—N/a	$10,000	
412	ONE Friday Fights 168: Wuttikrai vs. Habibpour / The Inner Circle 28	August 28, 2026	Lumpinee Boxing Stadium	Bangkok	Thailand	Denis Dotsenko	Korpai Sor.Yingcharoenkarnchang	$10,000	
412	ONE Friday Fights 168: Wuttikrai vs. Habibpour / The Inner Circle 28	August 28, 2026	Lumpinee Boxing Stadium	Bangkok	Thailand	Burklerk Lookmuangpet	Ryoto Nishiyama	$10,000	
411	ONE Friday Fights 167: Dedduanglek vs. Kongsuk 2 / The Inner Circle 27	August 21, 2026	Lumpinee Boxing Stadium	Bangkok	Thailand	Kajornklai Sor.Sor.Toipadriew	Raize	$10,000	
410	ONE Fight Night 46: Hemetsberger vs. Diachkova	August 15, 2026	Lumpinee Boxing Stadium	Bangkok	Thailand	Stella Hemetsberger	—N/a	$50,000	
409	ONE Friday Fights 166: Khunpon vs. Panpadej / The Inner Circle 26	August 14, 2026	Lumpinee Boxing Stadium	Bangkok	Thailand	Pet Sitchalongsak	Babak Haghi	$10,000	
409	ONE Friday Fights 166: Khunpon vs. Panpadej / The Inner Circle 26	August 14, 2026	Lumpinee Boxing Stadium	Bangkok	Thailand	Gingsanglek Tor.Laksong	—N/a	$10,000	
408	ONE Samurai 2	August 8, 2026	Ebara Wave Arena Ota	Tokyo	Japan	Masaaki Noiri	—N/a	$95,000	
408	ONE Samurai 2	August 8, 2026	Ebara Wave Arena Ota	Tokyo	Japan	Mohammad Siasarani	Keito Yamakita	$45,000	
408	ONE Samurai 2	August 8, 2026	Ebara Wave Arena Ota	Tokyo	Japan	Katsuki Kitano	—N/a	$45,000	
408	ONE Samurai 2	August 8, 2026	Ebara Wave Arena Ota	Tokyo	Japan	Subaru Mori	—N/a	$9,500	
407	ONE Friday Fights 165: Petninmungkorn vs. Pet / The Inner Circle 25	August 7, 2026	Lumpinee Boxing Stadium	Bangkok	Thailand	Suakim Sor.Jor.Tongprajin	—N/a	$50,000	
407	ONE Friday Fights 165: Petninmungkorn vs. Pet / The Inner Circle 25	August 7, 2026	Lumpinee Boxing Stadium	Bangkok	Thailand	Ilyas Musaev	Tantawy Ahmed Hafez	$10,000	
407	ONE Friday Fights 165: Petninmungkorn vs. Pet / The Inner Circle 25	August 7, 2026	Lumpinee Boxing Stadium	Bangkok	Thailand	Tsubasa Kaneko	—N/a	$10,000	
406	ONE Friday Fights 164: Watcharapon vs. Hamidi / The Inner Circle 24	July 31, 2026	Lumpinee Boxing Stadium	Bangkok	Thailand	Elbek Alyshov	—N/a	$50,000	
406	ONE Friday Fights 164: Watcharapon vs. Hamidi / The Inner Circle 24	July 31, 2026	Lumpinee Boxing Stadium	Bangkok	Thailand	Thongchai Jeabramintra	Islay Erika Bomogao	$10,000	
406	ONE Friday Fights 164: Watcharapon vs. Hamidi / The Inner Circle 24	July 31, 2026	Lumpinee Boxing Stadium	Bangkok	Thailand	Olivia Bahsous	Abdallah Ondash	$10,000	
406	ONE Friday Fights 164: Watcharapon vs. Hamidi / The Inner Circle 24	July 31, 2026	Lumpinee Boxing Stadium	Bangkok	Thailand	Asahi Shinagawa	—N/a	$10,000	
405	ONE Friday Fights 163: Pompet vs. Nat Khat Min / The Inner Circle 23	July 24, 2026	Lumpinee Boxing Stadium	Bangkok	Thailand	Aliff Sor.Dechapan	—N/a	$50,000	
405	ONE Friday Fights 163: Pompet vs. Nat Khat Min / The Inner Circle 23	July 24, 2026	Lumpinee Boxing Stadium	Bangkok	Thailand	Pompet Panthonggym	Petsuphan Lookmuangpet	$10,000	
405	ONE Friday Fights 163: Pompet vs. Nat Khat Min / The Inner Circle 23	July 24, 2026	Lumpinee Boxing Stadium	Bangkok	Thailand	Mahesuan Aekmuangnon	Ryujin Nasukawa	$10,000	
404	ONE Fight Night 45: Lessei vs. Rabah	July 18, 2026	Lumpinee Boxing Stadium	Bangkok	Thailand	Suablack Tor.Pran49	—N/a	$50,000	
403	ONE Friday Fights 162: Kongklai vs. Benwarwar / The Inner Circle 22	July 17, 2026	Lumpinee Boxing Stadium	Bangkok	Thailand	Adam Benwarwar	Kongklai Sor.Sommai	$10,000	
402	ONE Friday Fights 161: Jaradchai vs. Rhouni / The Inner Circle 21	July 10, 2026	Lumpinee Boxing Stadium	Bangkok	Thailand	Joshua Pacio	—N/a	$50,000	
402	ONE Friday Fights 161: Jaradchai vs. Rhouni / The Inner Circle 21	July 10, 2026	Lumpinee Boxing Stadium	Bangkok	Thailand	Petchsiam Jor.Pattreya	Petsangwan Sor.Samarngarment	$10,000	
402	ONE Friday Fights 161: Jaradchai vs. Rhouni / The Inner Circle 21	July 10, 2026	Lumpinee Boxing Stadium	Bangkok	Thailand	Tom Keogh	Kulabkaw Luksingnamchai	$10,000	
402	ONE Friday Fights 161: Jaradchai vs. Rhouni / The Inner Circle 21	July 10, 2026	Lumpinee Boxing Stadium	Bangkok	Thailand	Go Todoroki	Sunvo Torfunfarm	$10,000	
402	ONE Friday Fights 161: Jaradchai vs. Rhouni / The Inner Circle 21	July 10, 2026	Lumpinee Boxing Stadium	Bangkok	Thailand	Ali Kelat	—N/a	$10,000	
401	ONE Fight Night 44: Jarvis vs. Rungrawee 2	June 27, 2026	Lumpinee Boxing Stadium	Bangkok	Thailand	—N/a	—N/a	No Bonuses.	
400	ONE Friday Fights 160: Numsurin vs. Songchainoi 2 / The Inner Circle 20	June 26, 2026	Lumpinee Boxing Stadium	Bangkok	Thailand	Yodkhunpon Sitmonchai	Wanchainoi Sor.Tor.Hiewbangsaen	$10,000	
400	ONE Friday Fights 160: Numsurin vs. Songchainoi 2 / The Inner Circle 20	June 26, 2026	Lumpinee Boxing Stadium	Bangkok	Thailand	Ubaid Hussain	Ryuya Okuwaki	$10,000	
400	ONE Friday Fights 160: Numsurin vs. Songchainoi 2 / The Inner Circle 20	June 26, 2026	Lumpinee Boxing Stadium	Bangkok	Thailand	Julio Lobo	—N/a	$10,000	
399	ONE Friday Fights 159: Gonzalez vs. Chatanan / The Inner Circle 19	June 19, 2026	Lumpinee Boxing Stadium	Bangkok	Thailand	Xavier Gonzalez	Denis Dotsenko	$10,000	
399	ONE Friday Fights 159: Gonzalez vs. Chatanan / The Inner Circle 19	June 19, 2026	Lumpinee Boxing Stadium	Bangkok	Thailand	Kritpet P.K.Saenchai	Rifdean Masdor	$10,000	
399	ONE Friday Fights 159: Gonzalez vs. Chatanan / The Inner Circle 19	June 19, 2026	Lumpinee Boxing Stadium	Bangkok	Thailand	Olivia Bahsous	—N/a	$10,000	
398	ONE Friday Fights 158: Maisangkum vs. Petnamkhong / The Inner Circle 18	June 12, 2026	Lumpinee Boxing Stadium	Bangkok	Thailand	Petphupa Aekpujean	—N/a	$10,000	
397	ONE Friday Fights 157: Yodlekpet vs. Saw Min Min / The Inner Circle 17	June 5, 2026	Lumpinee Boxing Stadium	Bangkok	Thailand	Xavier Gonzalez	Tepatip ChampKhaomootod	$10,000	
397	ONE Friday Fights 157: Yodlekpet vs. Saw Min Min / The Inner Circle 17	June 5, 2026	Lumpinee Boxing Stadium	Bangkok	Thailand	Nazareth Lalthazuala	Kongchai Chanaidonmuang	$10,000	
397	ONE Friday Fights 157: Yodlekpet vs. Saw Min Min / The Inner Circle 17	June 5, 2026	Lumpinee Boxing Stadium	Bangkok	Thailand	Banluelok Sitwatcharachai	Taiga Orii	$10,000	
396	ONE Friday Fights 156: Kongsuk vs. Anisjon / The Inner Circle 16	May 29, 2026	Lumpinee Boxing Stadium	Bangkok	Thailand	Bakjo Sitkhunma	Kosei Yoshida	$10,000	
396	ONE Friday Fights 156: Kongsuk vs. Anisjon / The Inner Circle 16	May 29, 2026	Lumpinee Boxing Stadium	Bangkok	Thailand	Abdallah Ondash	Yuto Hirayama	$10,000	
395	ONE Friday Fights 155: Decho vs. Yunusov / The Inner Circle 15	May 22, 2026	Lumpinee Boxing Stadium	Bangkok	Thailand	Chokpreecha P.K.TomTK.Alaiyont	Rungruanglek TN.Muaythai	$10,000	
395	ONE Friday Fights 155: Decho vs. Yunusov / The Inner Circle 15	May 22, 2026	Lumpinee Boxing Stadium	Bangkok	Thailand	Ranma	Viet Anh Do	$10,000	
394	ONE Fight Night 43: Tang vs. Gasanov	May 16, 2026	Lumpinee Boxing Stadium	Bangkok	Thailand	Tang Kai	—N/a	$50,000	
393	ONE Friday Fights 154: Samingdam vs. Yodphupa / The Inner Circle 14	May 15, 2026	Lumpinee Boxing Stadium	Bangkok	Thailand	Anatoly Malykhin	—N/a	$100,000	
393	ONE Friday Fights 154: Samingdam vs. Yodphupa / The Inner Circle 14	May 15, 2026	Lumpinee Boxing Stadium	Bangkok	Thailand	Kade Ruotolo	—N/a	$50,000	
393	ONE Friday Fights 154: Samingdam vs. Yodphupa / The Inner Circle 14	May 15, 2026	Lumpinee Boxing Stadium	Bangkok	Thailand	Elvin Mammadov	Mahesuan Aekmuangnon	$10,000	
392	ONE Friday Fights 153: Worapon vs. Casse / The Inner Circle 13	May 8, 2026	Lumpinee Boxing Stadium	Bangkok	Thailand	Mohamed Taoufyq	Adam Benwarwar	$10,000	
392	ONE Friday Fights 153: Worapon vs. Casse / The Inner Circle 13	May 8, 2026	Lumpinee Boxing Stadium	Bangkok	Thailand	Hern N.F.Looksuan	—N/a	$10,000	
391	ONE Friday Fights 152: Kongklai vs. Lobo / The Inner Circle 12	May 1, 2026	Lumpinee Boxing Stadium	Bangkok	Thailand	Arsoonnoi Sitjasing	Tepkamin Thanapolresort	$10,000	
391	ONE Friday Fights 152: Kongklai vs. Lobo / The Inner Circle 12	May 1, 2026	Lumpinee Boxing Stadium	Bangkok	Thailand	Petsamart Muangphaphum	Natalia Diachkova	$10,000	
391	ONE Friday Fights 152: Kongklai vs. Lobo / The Inner Circle 12	May 1, 2026	Lumpinee Boxing Stadium	Bangkok	Thailand	Elbrus Osmanov	Dzhamil Osmanov	$10,000	
390	ONE Samurai 1	April 29, 2026	Ariake Arena	Tokyo	Japan	Takeru Segawa	—N/a	$95,000	
390	ONE Samurai 1	April 29, 2026	Ariake Arena	Tokyo	Japan	Avazbek Kholmirzaev	—N/a	$45,000	
390	ONE Samurai 1	April 29, 2026	Ariake Arena	Tokyo	Japan	Marat Grigorian	Chihiro Sawada	$30,000	
390	ONE Samurai 1	April 29, 2026	Ariake Arena	Tokyo	Japan	Itsuki Hirata	Shimon Yoshinari	$30,000	
390	ONE Samurai 1	April 29, 2026	Ariake Arena	Tokyo	Japan	Keito Yamakita	—N/a	$9,500	
389	ONE Friday Fights 151: Panpadej vs. Hussain / The Inner Circle 11	April 24, 2026	Lumpinee Boxing Stadium	Bangkok	Thailand	Martín Parra	Klinphaka Por.Thaisong	$10,000	
389	ONE Friday Fights 151: Panpadej vs. Hussain / The Inner Circle 11	April 24, 2026	Lumpinee Boxing Stadium	Bangkok	Thailand	Ricardo Sanchez	Carlo Bumina-ang	$10,000	
389	ONE Friday Fights 151: Panpadej vs. Hussain / The Inner Circle 11	April 24, 2026	Lumpinee Boxing Stadium	Bangkok	Thailand	Chen Jiayi	—N/a	$10,000	
388	ONE Fight Night 42: Mann vs. Dzabrailov	April 11, 2026	Lumpinee Boxing Stadium	Bangkok	Thailand	Sam-A Gaiyanghadao	Hiroba Minowa	$50,000	
387	ONE Friday Fights 150: Kompetch vs. Attachai / The Inner Circle 10	April 10, 2026	Lumpinee Boxing Stadium	Bangkok	Thailand	Dalian Dawody	Kazuteru Yamazaki	$10,000	
387	ONE Friday Fights 150: Kompetch vs. Attachai / The Inner Circle 10	April 10, 2026	Lumpinee Boxing Stadium	Bangkok	Thailand	Isaac Mohammed	Kota Abe	$10,000	
386	ONE Friday Fights 149: Tomyamkoong vs. Maximus / The Inner Circle 9	April 3, 2026	Lumpinee Boxing Stadium	Bangkok	Thailand	Tomyamkoong Bhumjaithai	Isaiah Badato	$10,000	
386	ONE Friday Fights 149: Tomyamkoong vs. Maximus / The Inner Circle 9	April 3, 2026	Lumpinee Boxing Stadium	Bangkok	Thailand	Ikko Ota	Petnamkhong Sor.Maneekhot	$10,000	
386	ONE Friday Fights 149: Tomyamkoong vs. Maximus / The Inner Circle 9	April 3, 2026	Lumpinee Boxing Stadium	Bangkok	Thailand	Jaradchai Maxjandee	Taiga Orii	$10,000	
385	ONE Friday Fights 148: Kongchai vs. Khanzadeh / The Inner Circle 8	March 27, 2026	Lumpinee Boxing Stadium	Bangkok	Thailand	Ahad Varghaeian	Kotaro Tanaka	$10,000	
384	ONE Friday Fights 147: Nong-O vs. Imangazaliev / The Inner Circle 7	March 20, 2026	Lumpinee Boxing Stadium	Bangkok	Thailand	Pompet Panthonggym	Suriyanlek Por.Yenying	$10,000	
384	ONE Friday Fights 147: Nong-O vs. Imangazaliev / The Inner Circle 7	March 20, 2026	Lumpinee Boxing Stadium	Bangkok	Thailand	Decho Por.Borirak	Ryoga Terayama	$10,000	
384	ONE Friday Fights 147: Nong-O vs. Imangazaliev / The Inner Circle 7	March 20, 2026	Lumpinee Boxing Stadium	Bangkok	Thailand	Pakorn P.K.Saenchai	PTT Apichartfarm	$10,000	
384	ONE Friday Fights 147: Nong-O vs. Imangazaliev / The Inner Circle 7	March 20, 2026	Lumpinee Boxing Stadium	Bangkok	Thailand	Yodlekpet Or.Atchariya	—N/a	$10,000	
383	ONE Fight Night 41: Sinsamut vs. Jarvis	March 14, 2026	Lumpinee Boxing Stadium	Bangkok	Thailand	Hyu Iwata	—N/a	$50,000	
382	ONE Friday Fights 146: Detchawalit vs. Dotsenko / The Inner Circle 6	March 13, 2026	Lumpinee Boxing Stadium	Bangkok	Thailand	Detchawalit Silkmuaythai	Kongsuk Fairtex	$10,000	
382	ONE Friday Fights 146: Detchawalit vs. Dotsenko / The Inner Circle 6	March 13, 2026	Lumpinee Boxing Stadium	Bangkok	Thailand	Singharat Sitkhuntab	—N/a	$10,000	
381	ONE Friday Fights 145: Worapon vs. Brossier / The Inner Circle 5	March 6, 2026	Lumpinee Boxing Stadium	Bangkok	Thailand	Worapon Lukjaoporongtom	Hern N.F.Looksuan	$10,000	
381	ONE Friday Fights 145: Worapon vs. Brossier / The Inner Circle 5	March 6, 2026	Lumpinee Boxing Stadium	Bangkok	Thailand	Klarob Nuikafeboran	Ethan Brockett	$10,000	
381	ONE Friday Fights 145: Worapon vs. Brossier / The Inner Circle 5	March 6, 2026	Lumpinee Boxing Stadium	Bangkok	Thailand	Nonthachai Jitmuangnon	—N/a	$10,000	
380	ONE Friday Fights 144: Chatpichit vs. Tubtimthong / The Inner Circle 4	February 27, 2026	Lumpinee Boxing Stadium	Bangkok	Thailand	Yodnatee PadungchaiMuaythai	Yuya Shibata	$10,000	
380	ONE Friday Fights 144: Chatpichit vs. Tubtimthong / The Inner Circle 4	February 27, 2026	Lumpinee Boxing Stadium	Bangkok	Thailand	Jin Mandokoro	—N/a	$10,000	
379	ONE Friday Fights 143: Vero vs. Cohen / The Inner Circle 3	February 20, 2026	Lumpinee Boxing Stadium	Bangkok	Thailand	Wanchainoi Sor.Tor.Hiewbangsaen	Teeyai Torfunfarn	$10,000	
379	ONE Friday Fights 143: Vero vs. Cohen / The Inner Circle 3	February 20, 2026	Lumpinee Boxing Stadium	Bangkok	Thailand	Lamsing T1.FightAcademy	—N/a	$10,000	
378	ONE Fight Night 40: Buntan vs. Hemetsberger 2	February 14, 2026	Lumpinee Boxing Stadium	Bangkok	Thailand	—N/a	—N/a	No Bonuses.	
377	ONE Friday Fights 142: Apiwat vs. Panpadej / The Inner Circle 2	February 13, 2026	Lumpinee Boxing Stadium	Bangkok	Thailand	Gregor Thom	Dokmaifai Topfairy	$10,000	
376	ONE Friday Fights 141: Komawut vs. Samingdam / The Inner Circle 1	February 6, 2026	Lumpinee Boxing Stadium	Bangkok	Thailand	Detchawalit Silkmuaythai	Face Erawan	$10,000	
376	ONE Friday Fights 141: Komawut vs. Samingdam / The Inner Circle 1	February 6, 2026	Lumpinee Boxing Stadium	Bangkok	Thailand	Haruyuki Tanitsu	Ramu Araya	$10,000	
376	ONE Friday Fights 141: Komawut vs. Samingdam / The Inner Circle 1	February 6, 2026	Lumpinee Boxing Stadium	Bangkok	Thailand	Adam Sor.Dechapan	Chokdee Maxjandee	$10,000	
375	ONE Friday Fights 140: Kongchai vs. Thway Lin Htet	January 30, 2026	Lumpinee Boxing Stadium	Bangkok	Thailand	Jaradchai Maxjandee	Viet Anh Do	$10,000	
375	ONE Friday Fights 140: Kongchai vs. Thway Lin Htet	January 30, 2026	Lumpinee Boxing Stadium	Bangkok	Thailand	Retsu Sashida	Ranma	$10,000	
375	ONE Friday Fights 140: Kongchai vs. Thway Lin Htet	January 30, 2026	Lumpinee Boxing Stadium	Bangkok	Thailand	Henrique de Almeida Cabral	—N/a	$10,000	
374	ONE Fight Night 39: Rambolek vs. Dayakaev	January 24, 2026	Lumpinee Boxing Stadium	Bangkok	Thailand	Rambolek Chor.Ajalaboon	Asadula Imangazaliev	$50,000	
373	ONE Friday Fights 139: Worapon vs. Soe Lin Oo	January 23, 2026	Lumpinee Boxing Stadium	Bangkok	Thailand	Worapon Lukjaoporongtom	Salai Htan Khee Shein	$10,000	
373	ONE Friday Fights 139: Worapon vs. Soe Lin Oo	January 23, 2026	Lumpinee Boxing Stadium	Bangkok	Thailand	Kajornklai Sor.Sor.Toipadriew	Kyaw Swar Win	$10,000	
373	ONE Friday Fights 139: Worapon vs. Soe Lin Oo	January 23, 2026	Lumpinee Boxing Stadium	Bangkok	Thailand	Batochir Batsaikhan	Zhao Zhengdong	$10,000	
372	ONE Friday Fights 138: Pompet vs. Decho	January 16, 2026	Lumpinee Boxing Stadium	Bangkok	Thailand	Kohtao Petsomnuk	Petninmungkorn NamkaengIceland	$10,000	
372	ONE Friday Fights 138: Pompet vs. Decho	January 16, 2026	Lumpinee Boxing Stadium	Bangkok	Thailand	Tahaneak Nayokatasala	Khunpon Or.AudUdon	$10,000	
372	ONE Friday Fights 138: Pompet vs. Decho	January 16, 2026	Lumpinee Boxing Stadium	Bangkok	Thailand	Rifdean Masdor	Cho Kyeong-jae	$10,000	

== Title fights ==
Title fights in 2026
Weight class				Method	Round	Time	Event	Notes
Featherweight Muay Thai	Nico Carrillo	def.	Shadow Singha Mawynn	Decision (unanimous)	5	3:00	ONE Fight Night 40	(Note: For the interim ONE Featherweight Muay Thai World Championship.)
Women's Strawweight Kickboxing	Stella Hemetsberger	def.	Jackie Buntan (c)	Decision (split)	5	3:00	ONE Fight Night 40	(Note: For the ONE Women's Strawweight Kickboxing World Championship.)
Welterweight Submission Grappling	Tye Ruotolo (c)	def.	Paweł Jaworski	Decision (unanimous)	1	10:00	ONE Fight Night 41	(Note: For the ONE Welterweight Submission Grappling World Championship.)
Bantamweight Muay Thai	Rambolek Chor.Ajalaboon	def.	Nabil Anane (c)	Decision (unanimous)	5	3:00	The Inner Circle 7	(Note: For the ONE Bantamweight Muay Thai World Championship.)
Flyweight Muay Thai	Asadula Imangazaliev	def.	Nong-O Hama	KO (punch to the body)	2	0:44	ONE Friday Fights 147	(Note: For the vacant ONE Flyweight Muay Thai World Championship.Imangazaliev missed weight (139.8 lb) and Nong-O was eligible win the title.)
Lightweight Kickboxing	Regian Eersel	def.	Rungrawee Sitsongpeenong	Decision (unanimous)	5	3:00	The Inner Circle 10	(Note: For the vacant ONE Lightweight Kickboxing World Championship.)
Flyweight Kickboxing	Takeru Segawa	def.	Rodtang Jitmuangnon	TKO (punches)	5	2:22	ONE Samurai 1	(Note: For the interim ONE Flyweight Kickboxing World Championship.)
Bantamweight Kickboxing	Jonathan Haggerty (c)	def.	Yuki Yoza	Decision (unanimous)	5	3:00	ONE Samurai 1	(Note: For the ONE Bantamweight Kickboxing World Championship.)
Flyweight	Avazbek Kholmirzaev	def.	Yuya Wakamatsu (c)	KO (spinning back elbow)	2	4:53	ONE Samurai 1	(Note: For the ONE Flyweight World Championship.)
Atomweight Muay Thai	Nadaka Yoshinari (c)	def.	Songchainoi Kiatsongrit	Decision (unanimous)	5	3:00	ONE Samurai 1	(Note: For the ONE Atomweight Muay Thai World Championship.)
Heavyweight	Anatoly Malykhin	def.	Oumar Kane (c)	KO (punches)	4	1:54	The Inner Circle 14	(Note: For the ONE Heavyweight World Championship.)
Featherweight	Tang Kai (c)	def.	Shamil Gasanov	TKO (leg kick and punches)	4	2:41	ONE Fight Night 43	(Note: For the ONE Featherweight World Championship.)
Heavyweight Kickboxing	Roman Kryklia	def.	Samet Agdeve (c)	Decision (unanimous)	5	3:00	The Inner Circle 19	(Note: For the ONE Heavyweight Kickboxing World Championship.)
Women's Atomweight Muay Thai	Allycia Rodrigues (c)	def.	Phetjeeja Lukjaoporongtom	Decision (split)	5	3:00	The Inner Circle 19	(Note: For the ONE Women's Atomweight Muay Thai World Championship.)
Flyweight Muay Thai	Asadula Imangazaliev	def.	Aslamjon Ortikov	Decision (split)	5	3:00	The Inner Circle 20	(Note: For the vacant ONE Flyweight Muay Thai World Championship.)
Strawweight	Joshua Pacio (c)	def.	Mansur Malachiev	Submission (rear-naked choke)	1	4:23	The Inner Circle 21	(Note: For the ONE Strawweight World Championship.)
Strawweight Kickboxing	Jonathan Di Bella (c)	def.	Zhang Peimian	Decision (unanimous)	5	3:00	The Inner Circle 22	(Note: For the ONE Strawweight Kickboxing World Championship.)
Strawweight Muay Thai	Aliff Sor.Dechapan	def.	Sam-A Gaiyanghadao	KO (head kick and punch)	5	1:09	The Inner Circle 23	(Note: For the interim ONE Strawweight Muay Thai World Championship.)
Bantamweight	Elbek Alyshov	def.	Enkh-Orgil Baatarkhuu (c)	TKO (punches)	2	2:52	The Inner Circle 24	(Note: For the ONE Bantamweight World Championship.)
Women's Strawweight Muay Thai	Stella Hemetsberger (c)	def.	Natalia Diachkova	KO (body kick and punches)	3	1:46	ONE Fight Night 46	(Note: For the ONE Women's Strawweight Muay Thai World Championship.)
Bantamweight Muay Thai	Yod-IQ Or.Pimolsri	def.	Rambolek Chor.Ajalaboon	Decision (unanimous)	5	3:00	The Inner Circle 30	(Note: For the vacant ONE Bantamweight Muay Thai World Championship.Rambolek missed weight (145.6 lb) and was stripped the title and Yod-IQ only eligible win the title.)
Lightweight Muay Thai	Regian Eersel (c)	def.	George Jarvis	KO (punch)	4	1:39	The Inner Circle 33	(Note: For the ONE Lightweight Muay Thai World Championship.)
Bantamweight Kickboxing	Jonathan Haggerty (c)	def.	Hiroki Akimoto	TKO (punches and knee)	3	0:42	ONE Samurai 4	(Note: For the ONE Bantamweight Kickboxing World Championship.)
Atomweight Muay Thai	Nadaka Yoshinari (c)	def.	Rifdean Masdor	KO (head kick)	2	0:58	ONE Samurai 4	(Note: For the ONE Atomweight Muay Thai World Championship. Masdor missed weight (118.6 lb) and Yoshinari only eligible win the title.)
Lightweight	Tye Ruotolo	def.	Christian Lee (c)	Submission (rear-naked choke)	1	2:08	The Inner Circle 37	(Note: For the ONE Lightweight World Championship.)
Strawweight	Joshua Pacio (c)	def.	Keito Yamakita	Submission (arm-triangle choke)	4	4:17	ONE Samurai 5	(Note: For the ONE Strawweight World Championship.)
Flyweight Muay Thai	Asadula Imangazaliev (c)	def.	Aslamjon Ortikov	Decision (split)	5	3:00	The Inner Circle 39	(Note: For the ONE Flyweight Muay Thai World Championship.)
Women's Atomweight	Chihiro Sawada	vs.	Anastasia Nikolakakos				ONE Samurai 6	(Note: For the vacant ONE Women's Atomweight World Championship.)
Strawweight Muay Thai	Prajanchai P.K.Saenchai (c)	vs.	Aliff Sor.Dechapan (ic)				The Inner Circle 43	(Note: For the unification ONE Strawweight Muay Thai World Championship.)
Featherweight Muay Thai	Nico Carrillo (c)	vs.	Nabil Anane				The Inner Circle 43	(Note: For the ONE Featherweight Muay Thai World Championship.)
Flyweight Submission Grappling	Diogo Reis (c)	vs.	Carlos Oliveira				ONE Fight Night 50	(Note: For the ONE Flyweight Submission Grappling World Championship.)

== ONE Samurai Featherweight Kickboxing Tournament ==
Quarter-finals
(Japan) Masaaki Noiri	KO
(China) Liu Mengyang	R1
(Japan) Kaito Ono	R1
(Iran) Mohammad Siasarani	KO
(Armenia) Marat Grigorian	UD
(Russia) Mamuka Usubyan	R3
(Japan) Kosuke Takagi	R3
(China) Luo Chao	UD

Semi-finals
(Japan) Masaaki Noiri	SD
(Iran) Mohammad Siasarani	R3
(Armenia) Marat Grigorian	Canceled
(China) Luo Chao	Canceled

Final
(Japan) Masaaki Noiri
(Armenia) Marat Grigorian

- Luo Chao was disqualified for missing weight.

== ONE Flyweight Muay Thai World Grand Prix ==
Quarter-finals
(Thailand) Rodtang Jitmuangnon	R3
(Thailand) Nong-O Hama	UD
(Japan) Shimon Yoshinari	UD
(Lebanon) Ramadan Ondash	R3
(Russia) Asadula Imangazaliev	SD
(Uzbekistan) Aslamjon Ortikov	R3
(Thailand) Black Panther VenumMuaythai	R3
(Pakistan) Ubaid Hussain	UD

Semi-finals
(Thailand) Nong-O Hama
(Japan) Shimon Yoshinari
(Russia) Asadula Imangazaliev
(Pakistan) Ubaid Hussain

Final

== ONE Friday Fights 138 ==
ONE Friday Fights 138: Pompet vs. Decho
- Promotion: ONE Championship
- Date: January 16, 2026
- Venue: Lumpinee Boxing Stadium
- City: Bangkok, Thailand
- Attendance: 3,200

ONE Friday Fights 138: Pompet vs. Decho (also known as ONE Lumpinee 138) was a combat sports event produced by ONE Championship that took place on January 16, 2026, at Lumpinee Boxing Stadium in Bangkok, Thailand.

=== Background ===
A flyweight Muay Thai bout between Pompet Panthonggym and Decho Por.Borirak was headlined the event.

=== Bonus awards ===
The following fighters received $10,000 bonuses:

- Performance of the Night: Kohtao Petsomnuk, Petninmungkorn NamkaengIceland, Tahaneak Nayokatasala, Khunpon Or.AudUdon, Rifdean Masdor and Cho Kyeong-jae

=== Results ===
ONE Friday Fights 138 (YouTube / Watch ONE)
Weight Class				Method	Round	Time	Notes
Flyweight Muay Thai	(Thailand) Decho Por.Borirak	def.	(Thailand) Pompet Panthonggym	Decision (unanimous)	3	3:00	
Strawweight Muay Thai	(Iraq) Ayad Albadr	def.	(Thailand) Chartpayak Saksatoon	Decision (unanimous)	3	3:00	
Strawweight Muay Thai	(Thailand) Kohtao Petsomnuk	def.	(Thailand) Tonglampoon FA.Group	KO (knee and punch)	2	2:32	
Bantamweight Muay Thai	(Thailand) Petgarfield Jitmuangnon	def.	(Scotland) Logan Chan	Decision (split)	3	3:00	Petgarfield missed weight (141 lb).
Atomweight Muay Thai	(Thailand) Petninmungkorn NamkangIceland	def.	(Thailand) Toyota Eaglemuaythai	KO (punches)	3	2:03	
Flyweight Muay Thai	(Thailand) Tahaneak Nayokatasala	def.	(Thailand) Khunpon Or.AudUdon	KO (punch)	3	1:49	
Flyweight Muay Thai	(Pakistan) Ubaid Hussain	def.	(Thailand) Brazil Aekmuangnon	Decision (unanimous)	3	3:00	
Atomweight Muay Thai	(Malaysia) Rifdean Masdor	def.	(Indonesia) Mohamad Redho	KO (knees and punches)	1	2:34	
Strawweight Kickboxing	(Japan) Shoma Okumura	def.	(China) Sheng Yi Hang	Decision (unanimous)	3	3:00	
Bantamweight MMA	(Belarus) Ilyas Eziyeu	def.	(Argentina) Lucas Ganin	Decision (split)	3	5:00	
Bantamweight Kickboxing	(South Korea) Cho Kyeong-jae	def.	(Japan) Shota	TKO (punches)	1	2:13	
Flyweight Kickboxing	(Cape Verde) Diogo Miguel Silva	def.	(Japan) Kazuteru Yamazaki	Decision (unanimous)	3	3:00	
Welterweight MMA	(Kazakhstan) Dias Otegen	def.	(Russia) Akhmed Rabadanov	Decision (unanimous)	3	5:00	
Flyweight Kickboxing	(Mexico) Anuar Cisneros	def.	(Japan) Shun Shiraishi	TKO (leg kicks)	2	0:42	

== ONE Friday Fights 139 ==
ONE Friday Fights 139: Worapon vs. Soe Lin Oo
- Promotion: ONE Championship
- Date: January 23, 2026
- Venue: Lumpinee Boxing Stadium
- City: Bangkok, Thailand
- Attendance: 3,800

ONE Friday Fights 139: Worapon vs. Soe Lin Oo (also known as ONE Lumpinee 139) was a combat sports event produced by ONE Championship that took place on January 23, 2026, at Lumpinee Boxing Stadium in Bangkok, Thailand.

=== Background ===
A bantamweight Muay Thai bout between Worapon Lukjaoporongtom and Soe Lin Oo was headlined the event.

=== Bonus awards ===
The following fighters received $10,000 bonuses:

- Performance of the Night: Worapon Lukjaoporongtom, Salai Htan Khee Shein, Kajornklai Sor.Sor.Toipadriew, Kyaw Swar Win, Batochir Batsaikhan and Zhao Zhengdong

=== Results ===
ONE Friday Fights 139 (YouTube / Watch ONE)
Weight Class				Method	Round	Time	Notes
Bantamweight Muay Thai	(Thailand) Worapon Lukjaoporongtom	def.	(Myanmar) Soe Lin Oo	KO (head kick)	1	1:27	
Strawweight Muay Thai	(France) Sandro Bosi	def.	(Thailand) Petsangwan Sor.Samarngarment	Decision (unanimous)	3	3:00	
Bantamweight Muay Thai	(Thailand) Superjeng Tded99	def.	(Thailand) Maemmot Sor.Salacheep	Decision (unanimous)	3	3:00	
Atomweight Muay Thai	(Myanmar) Salai Htan Khee Shein	def.	(Thailand) YodUdon K.Tongtalingchan	KO (punch)	2	0:21	
Strawweight Muay Thai	(Thailand) Den Sitnayoktaweeptaphong	def.	(Thailand) Jaoinsee P.K.Saenchai	Decision (unanimous)	3	3:00	
Bantamweight Muay Thai	(Thailand) Kajornklai Sor.Sor.Toipadriew	def.	(Thailand) Dunk Sor.Niyomsap	TKO (punch)	2	2:49	
Atomweight Muay Thai	(Thailand) Khunsuk Mor.Krungthepthonburi	def.	(Myanmar) Nay Yine	Decision (unanimous)	3	3:00	
Flyweight Muay Thai	(Russia) Rustam Yunusov	def.	(Thailand) Khunponnoi Sor.Sommai	Decision (unanimous)	3	3:00	
Bantamweight Muay Thai	(Myanmar) Kyaw Swar Win	def.	(Japan) Muga Seto	TKO (punch)	2	1:25	
Bantamweight MMA	(Mongolia) Batochir Batsaikhan	def.	(Australia) Alastair Volders	TKO (punches)	1	2:57	
Strawweight Kickboxing	(China) Zhao Zhengdong	def.	(Japan) Keisuke Monguchi	TKO (punches)	3	1:21	
Bantamweight Kickboxing	(Venezuela) Gabriel Pereira	def.	(Japan) Hiroki Suzuki	Decision (majority)	3	3:00	Pereira missed weight (148.2 lb).
Flyweight Muay Thai	(Spain) Pol Pascual	def.	(Uzbekistan) Daler Asrorov	TKO (leg kicks and punches)	2	1:15	
Strawweight MMA	(Vietnam) Thoan Nguyen Thanh	def.	(Italy) Gabriele Lionetti	Decision (unanimous)	3	5:00	

== ONE Friday Fights 140 ==
ONE Friday Fights 140: Kongchai vs. Thway Lin Htet
- Promotion: ONE Championship
- Date: January 30, 2026
- Venue: Lumpinee Boxing Stadium
- City: Bangkok, Thailand
- Attendance: 3,500

ONE Friday Fights 140: Kongchai vs. Thway Lin Htet (also known as ONE Lumpinee 140) was a combat sports event produced by ONE Championship that took place on January 30, 2026, at Lumpinee Boxing Stadium in Bangkok, Thailand.

=== Background ===
A strawweight Muay Thai bout between Kongchai Chanaidonmuang and Thway Lin Htet was headlined the event.

=== Bonus awards ===
The following fighters received $10,000 bonuses:

- Performance of the Night: Jaradchai Maxjandee, Viet Anh Do, Retsu Sashida, Ranma and Henrique de Almeida Cabral

=== Results ===
ONE Friday Fights 140 (YouTube / Watch ONE)
Weight Class				Method	Round	Time	Notes
Strawweight Muay Thai	(Thailand) Kongchai Chanaidonmuang	def.	(Myanmar) Thway Lin Htet	Decision (unanimous)	3	3:00	
Bantamweight Muay Thai	(Myanmar) Sonrak Fairtex	def.	(Thailand) Buakhiao Por.Paoin	KO (punch)	2	1:21	
Flyweight Muay Thai	(Thailand) Isannuea Chotbangsaen	def.	(Thailand) Sanit Aekmuangnon	KO (elbow)	2	0:29	
Flyweight Muay Thai	(Thailand) Jaradchai Maxjandee	def.	(Thailand) Sanpet Sor.Salacheep	KO (knee)	2	0:42	
Flyweight Muay Thai	(Thailand) Rungruanglek TN.Muaythai	def.	(Russia) Imam Gadzhiev	KO (punch)	1	1:57	
Women's Strawweight Muay Thai	(Switzerland) Zoe Neuschwander	def.	(Lebanon) Yara Saleh	Decision (unanimous)	3	3:00	
Flyweight Muay Thai	(Thailand) Petmuangdet JaTikUbon	def.	(Thailand) Pepsi Sor.Jaruwan	KO (punches to the body)	2	2:39	
Bantamweight Muay Thai	(Morocco) Hamza Rachid	def.	(Belarus) Antar Kacem	TKO (punches and head kick)	3	0:33	
Flyweight MMA	(Vietnam) Viet Anh Do	def.	(Philippines) Jean Claude Saclag	TKO (punches)	1	1:00	
Bantamweight MMA	(Paraguay) Waldimir Britez	def.	(Kyrgyzstan) Kazat Alymbek Uulu	TKO (knee to the body and punch)	1	1:08	
Flyweight Kickboxing	(China) Chen Jiayi	def.	(Japan) Hiroki Naruo	KO (punch)	3	1:25	
Flyweight Kickboxing	(Japan) Retsu Sashida	def.	(Russia) Danila Vasilikhin	KO (leg kick)	2	2:25	
Bantamweight Kickboxing	(Japan) Ranma	def.	(Thailand) Chalamkaw VenumMuaythai	KO (knees to the body)	3	0:58	
Middleweight Submission Grappling	(Brazil) Henrique de Almeida Cabral	def.	(Japan) Koki Ichikawa	Submission (heel hook)	1	6:52	

== ONE Friday Fights 141 & The Inner Circle 1 ==
ONE Friday Fights 141: Komawut vs. Samingdam / The Inner Circle 1
- Promotion: ONE Championship
- Date: February 6, 2026
- Venue: Lumpinee Boxing Stadium
- City: Bangkok, Thailand
- Attendance: 4,100

ONE Friday Fights 141: Komawut vs. Samingdam (also known as ONE Lumpinee 141) / The Inner Circle 1 was a combat sports event produced by ONE Championship that took place on February 6, 2026, at Lumpinee Boxing Stadium in Bangkok, Thailand.

=== Background ===
A flyweight Muay Thai bout between Komawut FA.Group and Samingdam N.F.Looksuan was headlined the event.

=== Bonus awards ===
The following fighters received $10,000 bonuses:

- Performance of the Night: Detchawalit Silkmuaythai, Face Erawan, Haruyuki Tanitsu, Ramu Araya, Adam Sor.Dechapan and Chokdee Maxjandee

=== Results ===
ONE Friday Fights 141 (YouTube / Facebook)
Weight Class				Method	Round	Time	Notes
Flyweight Muay Thai	(Thailand) Samingdam N.F.Looksuan	def.	(Thailand) Komawut FA.Group	Decision (split)	3	3:00	
Bantamweight Muay Thai	(Thailand) Detchawalit SilkMuaythai	def.	(Myanmar) Saw Min Min	KO (head kick and punch)	1	0:26	
Flyweight Muay Thai	(Thailand) Khunpon Aekmuangnon	def.	(Thailand) Sornsueknoi FA.Group	Decision (split)	3	3:00	
Strawweight Muay Thai	(Thailand) Face Erawan	def.	(Myanmar) Soe Naung Oo	TKO (punches and knee)	1	1:08	
Featherweight Kickboxing	(Russia) Mamuka Usubyan	def.	(Morocco) Yassin Airad	Decision (unanimous)	3	3:00	
Women's Atomweight Muay Thai	(Brazil) Gabriele Moram	def.	(Chile) Francisca Vera	Decision (unanimous)	3	3:00	
Strawweight Muay Thai	(Japan) Haruyuki Tanitsu	def.	(Myanmar) Lin Htet Aung	KO (punch to the body)	1	0:53	
Flyweight Muay Thai	(Japan) Ramu Araya	def.	(Malaysia) Wan Muhammad Sabri	KO (punches)	3	1:17	
Lightweight MMA	(Philippines) Hero Marco Manguray	def.	(Japan) Myke Ohura	TKO (punches)	1	2:36	

The Inner Circle 1 (Superfans at Live ONE)
Weight Class				Method	Round	Time	Notes
Bantamweight Kickboxing	(Thailand) Lamnamoonlek Or.Atchariya	def.	(Spain) Daniel Puertas Gallardo	Decision (unanimous)	3	3:00	
Flyweight Muay Thai	(Malaysia) Johan Ghazali	def.	(Myanmar) Ye Yint Naung	Decision (unanimous)	3	3:00	
Strawweight Muay Thai	(Malaysia) Adam Sor.Dechapan	def.	(Morocco) Walid Snoussi	KO (head kick)	2	1:01	
Atomweight Muay Thai	(Thailand) Chokdee Maxjandee	def.	(Thailand) Mahesuan Aekmuangnon	TKO (referee stoppage)	1	1:44	
Strawweight MMA	(Philippines) Moises Lois Ilogon	def.	(Japan) Masaki Suzuki	Submission (rear-naked choke)	2	4:34	

== ONE Friday Fights 142 & The Inner Circle 2 ==
ONE Friday Fights 142: Apiwat vs. Panpadej / The Inner Circle 2
- Promotion: ONE Championship
- Date: February 13, 2026
- Venue: Lumpinee Boxing Stadium
- City: Bangkok, Thailand
- Attendance: 3,400

ONE Friday Fights 142: Apiwat vs. Panpadej (also known as ONE Lumpinee 142) / The Inner Circle 2 was a combat sports event produced by ONE Championship that took place on February 13, 2026, at Lumpinee Boxing Stadium in Bangkok, Thailand.

=== Background ===
A flyweight Muay Thai bout between Apiwat Sor.Somnuk and Panpadej N.F.Looksuan was headlined the event.

=== Bonus awards ===
The following fighters received $10,000 bonuses:

- Performance of the Night: Gregor Thom and Dokmaifai Topfairy

=== Results ===
ONE Friday Fights 142 (YouTube / Facebook)
Weight Class				Method	Round	Time	Notes
Flyweight Muay Thai	(Thailand) Panpadej N.F.Looksuan	def.	(Thailand) Apiwat Sor.Somnuk	Decision (majority)	3	3:00	
Flyweight Muay Thai	(Scotland) Gregor Thom	def.	(Thailand) Donking Yotharakmuaythai	KO (punch)	2	2:59	
Strawweight Muay Thai	(Laos) Petnamkhong Sor.Maneekhot	def.	(Thailand) Payakrut Suajantokmuaythai	Decision (unanimous)	3	3:00	
Flyweight Muay Thai	(Thailand) Nuapet Torfunfarm	def.	(Uzbekistan) Khusen Salomov	Decision (unanimous)	3	3:00	
Women's Strawweight Muay Thai	(Jamaica) Shae Lei Wedderburn	def.	(Australia) Joanne La	TKO (doctor stoppage)	2	1:33	
Atomweight Muay Thai	(Thailand) Dokmaifai Topfairy	def.	(Thailand) Payak Saksatoon	KO (punches)	3	2:07	
Women's Atomweight MMA	(Russia) Alena Ignateva	def.	(France) Alexia Fontaine	Submission (rear-naked choke)	1	4:05	
Strawweight Muay Thai	(Thailand) Yodphupa VenumMuaythai	def.	(Japan) Shoui Kojima	Decision (unanimous)	3	3:00	
Strawweight Kickboxing	(China) Zhang Peimian	def.	(United Kingdom) Ellis Badr Barboza	Decision (unanimous)	3	3:00	

The Inner Circle 2 (Superfans at Live ONE)
Weight Class				Method	Round	Time	Notes
Flyweight Muay Thai	(Thailand) Suriyanlek Por.Yenying	def.	(Morocco) Mohamed Taoufyq	Decision (majority)	3	3:00	
Strawweight Muay Thai	(France) Isaac Mohammed	def.	(Japan) Jurai Ishii	Decision (split)	3	3:00	
Strawweight Muay Thai	(Algeria) Yonis Anane	def.	(Japan) Riamu Matsumoto	Decision (unanimous)	3	3:00	
Flyweight Muay Thai	(Thailand) Petlampun Muadablampang	def.	(Uzbekistan) Khasan Salomov	Decision (unanimous)	3	3:00	
Bantamweight MMA	(United States) Julian Mayorga	def.	(Japan) Toshihiko Konosu	TKO (punches)	1	2:08	

== ONE Fight Night 40 ==
ONE Fight Night 40: Buntan vs. Hemetsberger 2
- Promotion: ONE Championship
- Date: February 14, 2026
- Venue: Lumpinee Boxing Stadium
- City: Bangkok, Thailand
- Attendance: 4,600

ONE Fight Night 40: Buntan vs. Hemetsberger 2 was a combat sports event produced by ONE Championship that took place on February 14, 2026, at Lumpinee Boxing Stadium in Bangkok, Thailand.

=== Background ===
A ONE Women's Strawweight Kickboxing World Championship bout between current Champion Jackie Buntan and current ONE Women's Strawweight Muay Thai World Champion Stella Hemetsberger headlined the event. The pairing previously met at ONE Fight Night 35 in September 2025, in Women's Strawweight Muay thai World Title bout, when Hemetsberger captured the vacant title by unanimous decision.

An interim ONE Featherweight Muay Thai World Championship bout between Shadow Singha Mawynn and Nico Carrillo served as the event.

At the weigh-ins, one fighter failed to hydration test and missed weight for their respective fights:

- Joao Pedro Bueno Mendes weighted in at 158.6 pounds, 3.6 pounds over the featherweight limit and he was fined 30 percent of his purse which went to Fabricio Andrey.

=== Results ===
ONE Fight Night 40 (Amazon Prime Video)
Weight Class				Method	Round	Time	Notes
Women's Strawweight Kickboxing	(Austria) Stella Hemetsberger	def.	(United States) Jackie Buntan (c)	Decision (split)	5	3:00	For the ONE Women's Strawweight Kickboxing World Championship.
Featherweight Muay Thai	(Scotland) Nico Carrillo	def.	(Thailand) Shadow Singha Mawynn	Decision (unanimous)	5	3:00	For the interim ONE Featherweight Muay Thai World Championship.
Flyweight MMA	(China) Hu Yong	def.	(Philippines) Danny Kingad	TKO (punches)	1	4:50	
Heavyweight MMA	(Canada) Ben Tynan	def.	(Japan) Ryugo Takeuchi	Submission (arm-triangle choke)	1	2:07	
Lightweight MMA	(United States) Adrian Lee	def.	(Japan) Shozo Isojima	TKO (elbows and punches)	1	2:56	
Lightweight MMA	(Brazil) Lucas Gabriel	def.	(Russia) Magomed Akaev	Decision (unanimous)	3	5:00	
Featherweight Submission Grappling	(Brazil) Fabricio Andrey	def.	(Brazil) Joao Pedro Bueno Mendes	Decision (unanimous)	1	10:00	Mendes missed weight (158.6 lb).
Women's Atomweight MMA	(Malaysia) Jihin Radzuan	def.	(Brazil) Gabriela Fujimoto	TKO (elbows and punches)	3	3:36	

== ONE Friday Fights 143 & The Inner Circle 3 ==
ONE Friday Fights 143: Vero vs. Cohen / The Inner Circle 3
- Promotion: ONE Championship
- Date: February 20, 2026
- Venue: Lumpinee Boxing Stadium
- City: Bangkok, Thailand
- Attendance: 3,600

ONE Friday Fights 143: Vero vs. Cohen (also known as ONE Lumpinee 143) / The Inner Circle 3 was a combat sports event produced by ONE Championship that took place on February 20, 2026, at Lumpinee Boxing Stadium in Bangkok, Thailand.

=== Background ===
A women's atomweight Muay Thai bout between Vero Nika and Shir Cohen was headlined the event.

=== Bonus awards ===
The following fighters received $10,000 bonuses:

- Performance of the Night: Wanchainoi Sor.Tor.Hiewbangsaen, Lamsing T1.FightAcademy and Teeyai Torfunfarm

=== Results ===
ONE Friday Fights 143 (YouTube / Facebook)
Weight Class				Method	Round	Time	Notes
Women's Atomweight Muay Thai	(Myanmar) Vero Nika	def.	(Israel) Shir Cohen	Decision (split)	3	3:00	
Flyweight Muay Thai	(Thailand) Denkriangkrai Singha Mawynn	def.	(Thailand) Petapichat ApichatMuaythai	Decision (split)	3	3:00	
Strawweight Muay Thai	(Thailand) Wanchainoi Sor.Tor.Hiewbangsaen	def.	(Myanmar) Hlaing Htet Aung	TKO (punch to the body and knee)	3	2:03	
Flyweight Muay Thai	(Thailand) Lamsing T1.FightAcademy	def.	(Thailand) Plaipayak Sor.Sommai	KO (punch)	1	1:53	
Women's Strawweight MMA	(Georgia (country)) Elene Loladze	def.	(Philippines) Sarah Mahmood	Decision (unanimous)	3	5:00	
Flyweight Muay Thai	(Thailand) Teeyai Torfunfarm	def.	(Thailand) Anon Taladkondernmuangpon	KO (punch)	2	1:18	
Featherweight Kickboxing	(Russia) Michael Baranov	def.	(Japan) Shoma	KO (knee to the body)	3	2:55	
Flyweight Kickboxing	(Japan) Kosei Yoshida	def.	(Uzbekistan) Fakhriddin Khasanov	Decision (unanimous)	3	3:00	
Strawweight Muay Thai	(Thailand) Petchayut Nupranburi	def.	(Japan) Masatoshi Hirai	Decision (unanimous)	3	3:00	

The Inner Circle 3 (Superfans at Live ONE)
Weight Class				Method	Round	Time	Notes
Bantamweight Muay Thai	(Thailand) Panrit Lukjaomaesaiwaree	def.	(Thailand) Nakrob Fairtex	Decision (split)	3	3:00	
Bantamweight Muay Thai	(Morocco) Ayoub Yassine	def.	(Thailand) Wuttikrai Wor.Chakrawut	Decision (unanimous)	3	3:00	
Flyweight Muay Thai	(Thailand) Rambong Sor.Therapat	def.	(Laos) Songpandin Chor.Kaewwiset	Decision (split)	3	3:00	
Women's Atomweight Muay Thai	(Iran) Nazanin Hoseini	def.	(Thailand) Chabakaew Sor.Kanjanchai	Decision (split)	3	3:00	
Atomweight Muay Thai	(Malaysia) Muhammad Ridzuan	def.	(Japan) Riku Ito	Decision (majority)	3	3:00	

== ONE Friday Fights 144 & The Inner Circle 4 ==
ONE Friday Fights 144: Chatpichit vs. Tubtimthong / The Inner Circle 4
- Promotion: ONE Championship
- Date: February 27, 2026
- Venue: Lumpinee Boxing Stadium
- City: Bangkok, Thailand
- Attendance: 3,500

ONE Friday Fights 144: Chatpichit vs. Tubtimthong (also known as ONE Lumpinee 144) / The Inner Circle 4 was a combat sports event produced by ONE Championship that took place on February 27, 2026, at Lumpinee Boxing Stadium in Bangkok, Thailand.

=== Background ===
An atomweight Muay Thai bout between Chatpichit Sor.Sor.Toipadriew and Tubtimthong IngfahHotelUbon was headlined the event.

=== Bonus awards ===
The following fighters received $10,000 bonuses:

- Performance of the Night: Yodnatee PadungchaiMuaythai, Yuya Shibata and Jin Mandokoro

=== Results ===
ONE Friday Fights 144 (YouTube / Facebook)
Weight Class				Method	Round	Time	Notes
Atomweight Muay Thai	(Thailand) Chatpichit Sor.Sor.Toipadriew	def.	(Thailand) Tubtimthong IngfahHotelUbon	Decision (unanimous)	3	3:00	
Flyweight Muay Thai	(Thailand) Lothong Kruaynaimuanggym	def.	(Thailand) Wanpadej N.F.Looksuan	Decision (unanimous)	3	3:00	
Flyweight Muay Thai	(Thailand) Buakaew Sor.Sor.Pakorn	def.	(United Kingdom) Jacob Thompson	Decision (split)	3	3:00	
Featherweight Muay Thai	(Republic of Ireland) Tom Keogh	def.	(Iran) Sobhan Aghaei	KO (leg kick)	1	0:46	
Flyweight Muay Thai	(Thailand) Yodnatee PadungchaiMuaythai	def.	(Thailand) Samersing Petkiatpet	KO (punches)	2	2:56	
Strawweight MMA	(India) Nazareth Lalthazuala	def.	(Philippines) Jake Bron	Submission (arm-triangle choke)	2	3:56	
Bantamweight Muay Thai	(Italy) Lenny Blasi	def.	(Japan) Katsuki Kitano	Decision (unanimous)	3	3:00	
Featherweight Kickboxing	(Japan) Yuya Shibata	def.	(Morocco) Mohammed Hdidi	TKO (punches and knees)	2	1:37	
Flyweight MMA	(Uzbekistan) Sardor Karimboev	def.	(Mozambique) Edson Machavane	Decision (unanimous)	3	5:00	

The Inner Circle 4 (Superfans at Live ONE)
Weight Class				Method	Round	Time	Notes
Bantamweight Muay Thai	(Thailand) Kongklai Sor.Sommai	def.	(Iran) Mohammad Habibpour	TKO (knees)	2	2:47	
Bantamweight Kickboxing	(Thailand) Sangarthit Looksaikongdin	def.	(Japan) Taku	Decision (unanimous)	3	3:00	
Bantamweight Muay Thai	(Thailand) Yodphupa Petkiatpet	def.	(Morocco) Adam Benwarwar	Decision (unanimous)	3	3:00	
Strawweight Kickboxing	(Japan) Jin Mandokoro	def.	(Russia) Eduard Markarian	KO (head kick)	2	2:22	
Women's Atomweight Muay Thai	(Japan) Noah Fujiwara	def.	(Thailand) Kati Mor.Rajabhatkorat	Decision (unanimous)	3	3:00	

== ONE Friday Fights 145 & The Inner Circle 5 ==
ONE Friday Fights 145: Worapon vs. Brossier / The Inner Circle 5
- Promotion: ONE Championship
- Date: March 6, 2026
- Venue: Lumpinee Boxing Stadium
- City: Bangkok, Thailand
- Attendance: 3,500

ONE Friday Fights 145: Worapon vs. Brossier (also known as ONE Lumpinee 145) / The Inner Circle 5 was a combat sports event produced by ONE Championship that took place on March 6, 2026, at Lumpinee Boxing Stadium in Bangkok, Thailand.

=== Background ===
A bantamweight Muay Thai bout between Worapon Lukjaoporongtom and Arthur Brossier was headlined the event.

=== Bonus awards ===
The following fighters received $10,000 bonuses:

- Performance of the Night: Worapon Lukjaoporongtom, Hern N.F.Looksuan, Klarob Nuikafeboran, Ethan Brockett and Nonthachai Jitmuangnon

=== Results ===
ONE Friday Fights 145 (YouTube / Facebook)
Weight Class				Method	Round	Time	Notes
Bantamweight Muay Thai	(Thailand) Worapon Lukjaoporongtom	def.	(France) Arthur Brossier	KO (elbow)	1	1:57	
Strawweight Muay Thai	(Thailand) Hern N.F.Looksuan	def.	(Thailand) Bernueng Sor.Salacheep	KO (punch to the body)	2	2:44	
Strawweight Muay Thai	(Thailand) Brucelee Sor.Boonmeerit	def.	(Thailand) Attachai N.F.Looksuan	Decision (unanimous)	3	3:00	
Flyweight Muay Thai	(Thailand) Klarob Nuikafeboran	def.	(Iran) Babak Haghi	KO (punches to the body)	2	0:30	
Women's Atomweight Muay Thai	(Turkey) Zeynep Cetintas	def.	(Hong Kong) Tsz Ching Phoebe Lo	Decision (unanimous)	3	3:00	
Lightweight MMA	(New Zealand) Ethan Brockett	def.	(India) Rayyan Butt	Submission (d'arce choke)	2	2:16	
Strawweight Muay Thai	(Thailand) Padejsuk Sor.Sommai	def.	(Thailand) Daodaeng AnnyMuaythai	Decision (unanimous)	3	3:00	
Bantamweight Kickboxing	(France) Arthur Klopp	def.	(Japan) Ryuki Yoshioka	Decision (unanimous)	3	3:00	
Bantamweight Muay Thai	(Iran) Arman Moradi	def.	(United Kingdom) Otis Waghorn	Decision (unanimous)	3	3:00	

The Inner Circle 5 (Superfans at Live ONE)
Weight Class				Method	Round	Time	Notes
Featherweight Muay Thai	(Thailand) Nonthachai Jitmuangnon	def.	(Turkey) Semih Sah Cindir	TKO (elbow)	3	1:54	Cindir missed weight (149.8 lb).
Strawweight Muay Thai	(Thailand) Watcharapon Laochokcharoen	def.	(Brazil) Leandro Douglas	Decision (unanimous)	3	3:00	
Atomweight Kickboxing	(Thailand) Banluelok Sitwatcharachai	def.	(Japan) Toma Kuroda	Decision (unanimous)	3	3:00	
Strawweight Kickboxing	(Thailand) Singdam Kafefocus	def.	(Japan) Ryuki Matsuda	Decision (unanimous)	3	3:00	
Flyweight MMA	(Japan) Koki Adachi	def.	(United Kingdom) Jason Seddoh	Decision (split)	3	5:00	

== ONE Friday Fights 146 & The Inner Circle 6 ==
ONE Friday Fights 146: Detchawalit vs. Dotsenko / The Inner Circle 6
- Promotion: ONE Championship
- Date: March 13, 2026
- Venue: Lumpinee Boxing Stadium
- City: Bangkok, Thailand
- Attendance: 3,700

ONE Friday Fights 146: Detchawalit vs. Dotsenko (also known as ONE Lumpinee 146) / The Inner Circle 6 was a combat sports event produced by ONE Championship that took place on March 13, 2026, at Lumpinee Boxing Stadium in Bangkok, Thailand.

=== Background ===
A bantamweight Muay Thai bout between Detchawalit Silkmuaythai and Denis Dotsenko was headlined the event.

=== Bonus awards ===
The following fighters received $10,000 bonuses:

- Performance of the Night: Detchawalit Silkmuaythai, Kongsuk Fairtex and Singharat Sitkhuntab

=== Results ===
ONE Friday Fights 146 (YouTube / Facebook)
Weight Class				Method	Round	Time	Notes
Bantamweight Muay Thai	(Thailand) Detchawalit Silkmuaythai	def.	(Ukraine) Denis Dotsenko	KO (punch)	2	2:38	
Bantamweight Muay Thai	(Thailand) Kongsuk Fairtex	def.	(Iran) Babak Solouki	KO (punch)	3	2:27	
Bantamweight Muay Thai	(Thailand) Singharat Sitkhuntab	def.	(Thailand) Kajornklai Sor.Sor.Toipadriew	KO (punches)	2	1:19	
Flyweight Muay Thai	(Thailand) Arsoonnoi Sitjasing	def.	(Thailand) Nuapayak Jitmuangnon	Decision (unanimous)	3	3:00	
Strawweight Muay Thai	(Thailand) Kongmeechai Sor.Bangrajan	def.	(Ukraine) Andrii Mezentsev	Decision (split)	3	3:00	
Lightweight MMA	(Kazakhstan) Dias Otegen	def.	(Peru) Malambo Pelaez	Decision (unanimous)	3	5:00	
Bantamweight Muay Thai	(Thailand) Prabsuk Sitkaewprapon	vs.	(Myanmar) Ye Yint Naung	NC (accidental eye poke)	2	2:41	Accidental eye poke rendered Prabsuk unable to continue.
Strawweight Kickboxing	(China) Sheng Yizhuo	def.	(Japan) Fuga Tokoro	Decision (unanimous)	3	3:00	
Welterweight Muay Thai	(Thailand) Petkhaokradong Lukjaomaesaithong	def.	(Myanmar) Tun Min Aung	Decision (unanimous)	3	3:00	

The Inner Circle 6 (Superfans at Live ONE)
Weight Class				Method	Round	Time	Notes
Atomweight Muay Thai	(Thailand) Densiam Liamthanawat	def.	(Thailand) Petkriangkrai Jitmuangnon	Decision (unanimous)	3	3:00	
Flyweight Muay Thai	(Myanmar) Sulaiman N.F.Looksuan	def.	(China) Zhang Jinhu	TKO (doctor stoppage)	1	3:00	
Flyweight Muay Thai	(Thailand) Rungruanglek T.N.Muaythai	def.	(Thailand) Kraithong P.U.Phabai	TKO (punch)	2	1:03	
Women's Atomweight Kickboxing	(Japan) Misaki Morita	def.	(Thailand) Priaowan Petphairat	Decision (split)	3	3:00	
Welterweight MMA	(Australia) Sarmad Jahanara	def.	(Chinese Taipei) Chih Cheng Yu	Decision (unanimous)	3	5:00	

== ONE Fight Night 41 ==
ONE Fight Night 41: Sinsamut vs. Jarvis
- Promotion: ONE Championship
- Date: March 14, 2026
- Venue: Lumpinee Boxing Stadium
- City: Bangkok, Thailand
- Attendance: 4,300

ONE Fight Night 41: Sinsamut vs. Jarvis was a combat sports event produced by ONE Championship that took place on March 14, 2026, at Lumpinee Boxing Stadium in Bangkok, Thailand.

=== Background ===
A ONE Women's Atomweight Muay Thai World Championship bout between current champion Allycia Rodrigues and current ONE Women's Atomweight Kickboxing World champion Phetjeeja Lukjaoporongtom was scheduled to headline the event. However, The bout was canceled after both fighters has an injury. Therefore, a lightweight Muay Thai bout between Sinsamut Klinmee and George Jarvis headlined the event.

A ONE Welterweight Submission Grappling World Championship bout between current champion Tye Ruotolo and promotional newcomer Paweł Jaworski served as the event.

At the weigh-ins, three fighters failed to hydration test and missed weight for their respective fights:

- Suablack Tor.Pran49 weighted in at 139.8 pounds, 4.8 pounds over the flyweight limit and he was fined 30 percent of his purse which went to Hyu Iwata.
- Marcos Aurélio weighted in at 151.6 pounds, 6.6 pounds over the bantamweight limit.
- Mauro Mastromarini weighted in at 148.6 pounds, 3.6 pounds over the bantamweight limit.

=== Bonus awards ===
The following fighters received $50,000 bonuses:

- Performance of the Night: Hyu Iwata

=== Results ===
ONE Fight Night 41 (Amazon Prime Video)
Weight Class				Method	Round	Time	Notes
Lightweight Muay Thai	(United Kingdom) George Jarvis	def.	(Thailand) Sinsamut Klinmee	Decision (unanimous)	3	3:00	
Welterweight Submission Grappling	(United States) Tye Ruotolo (c)	def.	(Poland) Paweł Jaworski	Decision (unanimous)	1	10:00	For the ONE Welterweight Submission Grappling World Championship.
Featherweight Kickboxing	(United Kingdom) Benjamin Woolliss	def.	(Brazil) John Lineker	TKO (leg kick)	1	1:57	
Strawweight MMA	(South Korea) Lee Seung-chul	def.	(Brazil) Fabio Henrique	Decision (unanimous)	3	5:00	
Flyweight Kickboxing	(Japan) Hyu Iwata	def.	(Thailand) Suablack Tor.Pran49	TKO (knee to the body)	1	2:35	Suablack missed weight (139.8 lb).
Women's Atomweight MMA	(Canada) Anastasia Nicolakakos	def.	(Brazil) Victória Souza	KO (punch)	1	4:59	
Bantamweight MMA	(Brazil) Marcos Aurélio	def.	(Argentina) Mauro Mastromarini	Submission (rear-naked choke)	2	3:27	Both fighters missed weight: Aurélio (151.6 lb), Mastromarini (148.6 lb).
Women's Atomweight Muay Thai	(Hong Kong) Yu Yau Pui	def.	(Thailand) Anna Jaroonsak	TKO (punches to the body)	1	1:15	
Flyweight MMA	(South Africa) Willie van Rooyen	def.	(Philippines) Jeremy Miado	TKO (punches)	3	3:35	

== ONE Friday Fights 147 & The Inner Circle 7 ==
ONE Friday Fights 147: Nong-O vs. Imangazaliev / The Inner Circle 7
- Promotion: ONE Championship
- Date: March 20, 2026
- Venue: Lumpinee Boxing Stadium
- City: Bangkok, Thailand
- Attendance: 3,700

ONE Friday Fights 147: Nong-O vs. Imangazaliev (also known as ONE Lumpinee 147) / The Inner Circle 7 was a combat sports event produced by ONE Championship that took place on March 20, 2026, at Lumpinee Boxing Stadium in Bangkok, Thailand.

=== Background ===
A ONE Flyweight Muay Thai World Championship bout for the vacant title between former ONE Bantamweight Muay Thai World Champion Nong-O Hama and Asadula Imangazaliev was headlined the event.

A ONE Bantamweight Muay Thai World Championship bout between current champion Nabil Anane and Rambolek Chor.Ajalaboon served as the event.

=== Bonus awards ===
The following fighters received $10,000 bonuses:

- Performance of the Night: Pompet Panthonggym, Suriyanlek Por.Yenying, Decho Por.Borirak, Ryoga Terayama, Pakorn P.K.Saenchai, PTT Apichartfarm and Yodlekpet Or.Atchariya

=== Results ===
ONE Friday Fights 147 (YouTube / Facebook)
Weight Class				Method	Round	Time	Notes
Flyweight Muay Thai	(Russia) Asadula Imangazaliev	def.	(Thailand) Nong-O Hama	KO (left hook)	2	0:44	For the vacant ONE Flyweight Muay Thai World Championship.Imangazaliev missed weight (139.8 lb) and Nong-O was eligible win the title.
Flyweight Muay Thai	(Thailand) Pompet Panthonggym	def.	(Thailand) Jaosuayai Mor. Krungthepthonburi	TKO (punches)	3	2:25	
Bantamweight Muay Thai	(Thailand) Ratchasiesan Laochokcharoen	def.	(Uzbekistan) Uzair Ismoiljonov	KO (punches and knees)	3	2:33	Both Fighters missed weight: Ratchasiesan (146.8 lb), Ismoiljonov (145.6 lb).
Flyweight Muay Thai	(Thailand) Suriyanlek Por.Yenying	def.	(Scotland) Gregor Thom	Decision (unanimous)	3	3:00	
Flyweight Muay Thai	(Thailand) Samingdam N.F.Looksuan	def.	(Myanmar) Kyaw Swar Win	Decision (unanimous)	3	3:00	Samingdam missed weight (136.2 lb).
Flyweight Muay Thai	(Thailand) Decho Por.Borirak	def.	(Azerbaijan) Elvin Kazumovi	KO (elbows)	1	1:14	
Strawweight Muay Thai	(Thailand) Pet Suanluangrodyok	def.	(Thailand) Numsurin Chor.Ketwina	Decision (unanimous)	3	3:00	
Bantamweight Kickboxing	(Japan) Ryoga Terayama	def.	(Armenia) Narek Khachikyan	KO (punch)	2	2:59	
Strawweight Muay Thai	(China) Zhao Zhengdong	def.	(France) Yonis Anane	Decision (unanimous)	3	3:00	

The Inner Circle 7 (Superfans at Live ONE)
Weight Class				Method	Round	Time	Notes
Bantamweight Muay Thai	(Thailand) Rambolek Chor.Ajalaboon	def.	(Algeria) Nabil Anane (c)	Decision (unanimous)	5	3:00	For the ONE Bantamweight Muay Thai World Championship.
Bantamweight Muay Thai	(Thailand) Pakorn P.K.Saenchai	def.	(Thailand) Saeksan Or. Kwanmuang	TKO (punch)	1	0:59	
Bantamweight Muay Thai	(Thailand) PTT Apichartfarm	def.	(United States) Arian Esparza	KO (spinning back elbow)	3	2:01	
Flyweight Muay Thai	(Thailand) Yodlekpet Or.Atchariya	def.	(Thailand) Gingsanglek Tor.Laksong	KO (punch)	3	1:26	
Flyweight Muay Thai	(Japan) Hikaru Furumura	def.	(Algeria) Adam Messaoudi	Decision (split)	3	3:00	

== ONE Friday Fights 148 & The Inner Circle 8 ==
ONE Friday Fights 148: Kongchai vs.Khanzadeh / The Inner Circle 8
- Promotion: ONE Championship
- Date: March 27, 2026
- Venue: Lumpinee Boxing Stadium
- City: Bangkok, Thailand
- Attendance: 3,500

ONE Friday Fights 148: Kongchai vs. Khanzadeh (also known as ONE Lumpinee 148) / The Inner Circle 8 was a combat sports event produced by ONE Championship that took place on March 27, 2026, at Lumpinee Boxing Stadium in Bangkok, Thailand.

=== Background ===
A strawweight Muay Thai bout between Kongchai Chanaidonmuang and Mehrdad Khanzadeh was headlined the event.

=== Bonus awards ===
The following fighters received $10,000 bonuses:

- Performance of the Night: Ahad Varghaeian and Kotaro Tanaka

=== Results ===
ONE Friday Fights 148 (YouTube / Facebook)
Weight Class				Method	Round	Time	Notes
Strawweight Muay Thai	(Thailand) Kongchai Chanaidonmuang	def.	(Iran) Mehrdad Khanzadeh	Decision (unanimous)	3	3:00	
Flyweight Muay Thai	(Thailand) Denkriangkrai Singha Mawynn	def.	(Moldova) Valerii Strungari	Decision (unanimous)	3	3:00	
Bantamweight Muay Thai	(Thailand) Superjeng Torfunfarm	def.	(Thailand) Prompadej N.F.Looksuan	Decision (unanimous)	3	3:00	
Featherweight Muay Thai	(Iran) Ahad Varghaeian	def.	(Spain) Jorge Pastor	KO (punches)	2	1:07	Pastor missed weight (153.2 lb).
Strawweight Muay Thai	(Thailand) Krungthai Torfunfarm	def.	(Thailand) Binladin Sor.Poonsawat	Decision (unanimous)	3	3:00	
Flyweight MMA	(Iran) Sattor Rizoev	def.	(Brazil) Felipe Silva	Decision (split)	3	5:00	
Women's Atomweight Muay Thai	(Thailand) Nongfahsai TOP P.K.Saenchai	def.	(Hong Kong) Wang Tsz Ching	Decision (unanimous)	3	3:00	
Strawweight Kickboxing	(Japan) Shota Takezoe	def.	(China) Sheng Yiyang	Decision (split)	3	3:00	
Bantamweight Kickboxing	(Japan) Ranma	def.	(France) Velihan Palit	Decision (unanimous)	3	3:00	

The Inner Circle 8 (Superfans at Live ONE)
Weight Class				Method	Round	Time	Notes
Flyweight Muay Thai	(Thailand) Dedduanglek Torfunfarm	def.	(Myanmar) Sonrak Fairtex	Decision (unanimous)	3	3:00	
Flyweight Kickboxing	(China) Yuan Pengjie	def.	(Thailand) Lamnamoonlek Or.Atchariya	Decision (unanimous)	3	3:00	
Flyweight Muay Thai	(Thailand) Khundet P.K.Saenchai	def.	(Mexico) Anuar Cisneros	Decision (unanimous)	3	3:00	
Strawweight Kickboxing	(Japan) Shoma Okumura	def.	(Uzbekistan) Adham Ruziev	Decision (split)	3	3:00	
Flyweight MMA	(Japan) Kotaro Tanaka	def.	(Vietnam) Quoc Danh	Submission (ankle lock)	1	3:36	

== ONE Friday Fights 149 & The Inner Circle 9 ==
ONE Friday Fights 149: Tomyamkoong vs. Maximus / The Inner Circle 9
- Promotion: ONE Championship
- Date: April 3, 2026
- Venue: Lumpinee Boxing Stadium
- City: Bangkok, Thailand
- Attendance: 3,400

ONE Friday Fights 149: Tomyamkoong vs. Maximus (also known as ONE Lumpinee 149) / The Inner Circle 9 was a combat sports event produced by ONE Championship that took place on April 3, 2026, at Lumpinee Boxing Stadium in Bangkok, Thailand.

=== Background ===
A flyweight Muay Thai bout between Tomyamkoong Bhumjaithai and Bejenuţă Maximus was headlined the event.

=== Bonus awards ===
The following fighters received $10,000 bonuses:

- Performance of the Night: Tomyamkoong Bhumjaithai, Isaiah Badato, Ikko Ota, Petnamkhong Sor.Maneekhot, Jaradchai Maxjandee and Taiga Orii

=== Results ===
ONE Friday Fights 149 (YouTube / Facebook)
Weight Class				Method	Round	Time	Notes
Flyweight Muay Thai	(Thailand) Tomyamkoong Bhumjaithai	def.	(Moldova) Bejenuţă Maximus	TKO (knees and elbow)	3	1:43	
Flyweight Muay Thai	(Thailand) Isannuea Chotbangsaen	def.	(Thailand) Khunpon Aekmuangnon	KO (punch to the body)	1	2:23	Isannuea missed weight (129.8 lb).
Featherweight Muay Thai	(Turkey) Ali Kelat	def.	(Spain) Kevin Guillen	TKO (punches)	3	1:33	
Atomweight Muay Thai	(Myanmar) Har Ling Om	def.	(Thailand) Khunsuk T1.FightAcademy	Decision (unanimous)	3	3:00	
Strawweight MMA	(Tajikistan) Parviz Khamidzhonov	def.	(Russia) Torepchi Dongak	Decision (unanimous)	3	5:00	
Women's Atomweight Muay Thai	(Thailand) Ploychan Sitnayokdam	def.	(Poland) Vanessa Romanowski	Decision (unanimous)	3	3:00	
Atomweight Kickboxing	(Japan) Blackshisha Sotaro	def.	(Indonesia) Delfan Dwi Satrio	Decision (unanimous)	3	3:00	
Flyweight Kickboxing	(Australia) Isaiah Badato	def.	(Japan) Retsu Sashida	KO (knee)	1	1:14	
Strawweight Muay Thai	(Japan) Ikko Ota	def.	(Thailand) Payakrut Suajanthokmuaythai	KO (punch)	3	2:33	

The Inner Circle 9 (Superfans at Live ONE)
Weight Class				Method	Round	Time	Notes
Strawweight Muay Thai	(Thailand) Kaotaem Fairtex	def.	(Spain) Xavier Gonzalez	Decision (unanimous)	3	3:00	
Strawweight Muay Thai	(Thailand) Dokmaipa Santiubon	def.	(Thailand) Aekkalak Sor.Samarngarment	Decision (unanimous)	3	3:00	
Strawweight Muay Thai	(Laos) Petnamkhong Sor.Maneekhot	def.	(Thailand) Tonglampoon FA.Group	TKO (punches)	2	1:01	
Flyweight Muay Thai	(Thailand) Jaradchai Maxjandee	def.	(Myanmar) Thant Zin	KO (head kick)	1	1:38	
Bantamweight MMA	(Japan) Taiga Orii	def.	(India) Zar Mawia	TKO (punch to the body)	2	3:37	

== ONE Friday Fights 150 & The Inner Circle 10 ==
ONE Friday Fights 150: Kompetch vs. Attachai / The Inner Circle 10
- Promotion: ONE Championship
- Date: April 10, 2026
- Venue: Lumpinee Boxing Stadium
- City: Bangkok, Thailand
- Attendance: 4,300

ONE Friday Fights 150: Kompetch vs. Attachai (also known as ONE Lumpinee 150) / The Inner Circle 10 was a combat sports event produced by ONE Championship that took place on April 10, 2026, at Lumpinee Boxing Stadium in Bangkok, Thailand.

=== Background ===
A strawweight Muay Thai bout between Kompetch Fairtex and Attachai Kelasport was headlined the event.

=== Bonus awards ===
The following fighters received $10,000 bonuses:

- Performance of the Night: Dalian Dawody, Kazuteru Yamazaki, Isaac Mohammed and Kota Abe

=== Results ===
ONE Friday Fights 150 (YouTube / Facebook)
Weight Class				Method	Round	Time	Notes
Strawweight Muay Thai	(Thailand) Attachai Kelasport	def.	(Thailand) Kompetch Fairtex	Decision (unanimous)	3	3:00	
Flyweight Muay Thai	(Thailand) Rambong Sor.Therapat	def.	(Thailand) Pethuahin Jitmuangnon	Decision (majority)	3	3:00	
Flyweight Muay Thai	(Thailand) Sornsueknoi FA.Group	def.	(Thailand) Nuapet Torfunfarm	TKO (punches)	2	1:07	
Lightweight Muay Thai	(Lebanon) Nassib Hmede	def.	(Poland) Bartek Paszczyk	KO (punches to the body)	3	2:39	
Lightweight Muay Thai	(Sweden) Dalian Dawody	def.	(Portugal) Dante Rodrigues	KO (punch)	2	2:01	
Atomweight Muay Thai	(Thailand) Chokdee Maxjandee	def.	(Myanmar) Salai Htan Khee Shein	Decision (unanimous)	3	3:00	
Bantamweight MMA	(Azerbaijan) Rasul Rahimov	def.	(Paraguay) Waldimir Britez	Decision (split)	3	5:00	
Flyweight Kickboxing	(Japan) Kazuteru Yamazaki	def.	(China) Hong Chengzhi	KO (body kick)	1	2:32	
Flyweight Kickboxing	(Japan) Kosei Yoshida	def.	(China) Huang Zhengbang	Decision (unanimous)	3	3:00	

The Inner Circle 10 (Superfans at Live ONE)
Weight Class				Method	Round	Time	Notes
Lightweight Kickboxing	(Suriname) Regian Eersel	def.	(Thailand) Rungrawee Sitsongpeenong	Decision (unanimous)	5	3:00	For the vacant ONE Lightweight Kickboxing World Championship.
Strawweight Muay Thai	(France) Isaac Mohammed	def.	(Thailand) Rittidet Lukjaoporongtom	KO (elbows and punches)	3	0:45	
Featherweight Muay Thai	(France) Elies Abdelali	def.	(Morocco) Hicham Zerouali	TKO (punches)	2	1:14	
Bantamweight Muay Thai	(Scotland) Logan Chan	def.	(Thailand) Kaokarat Sor.Tienpo	KO (punch)	2	0:34	
Lightweight MMA	(Japan) Kota Abe	def.	(Philippines) Hero Marco Manguray	KO (punches)	3	1:47	

== ONE Fight Night 42 ==
ONE Fight Night 42: Mann vs. Dzhabrailov
- Promotion: ONE Championship
- Date: April 11, 2026
- Venue: Lumpinee Boxing Stadium
- City: Bangkok, Thailand
- Attendance: 4,400

ONE Fight Night 42: Mann vs. Dzhabrailov was a combat sports event produced by ONE Championship that took place on April 11, 2026, at Lumpinee Boxing Stadium in Bangkok, Thailand.

=== Background ===
A ONE Lightweight Kickboxing World Championship bout for the vacant title between former champion (also a current ONE Lightweight Muay Thai World Champion) Regian Eersel and Rungrawee Sitsongpeenong was scheduled to headline the event.But the bout was moved to ONE Friday Fights 150 instead, Therefore, a Welterweight bout between Chase Mann and Dzhabir Dzhabrailov headlined the event.

At the weigh-ins, two fighters failed to hydration test and missed weight for their respective fights:

- Diego Paez weighted in at 140.4 pounds, 5.4 pounds over the flyweight limit and he was fined 30 percent of his purse which went to Black Panther VenumMuaythai.
- Mohanad Battbootti weighted in at 148.6 pounds, 3.6 pounds over the bantamweight limit and he was fined 30 percent of his purse which went to Dmitrii Kovtun.

=== Bonus awards ===
The following fighters received $50,000 bonuses:

- Performance of the Night: Sam-A Gaiyanghadao and Hiroba Minowa

=== Results ===
ONE Fight Night 42 (Amazon Prime Video)
Weight Class				Method	Round	Time	Notes
Welterweight MMA	(Turkey) Dzhabir Dzhabrailov	def.	(United States) Chase Mann	KO (punches)	1	2:31	
Strawweight Muay Thai	(Thailand) Sam-A Gaiyanghadao	def.	(Morocco) Elmehdi El Jamari	KO (head kick)	2	2:43	
Bantamweight Muay Thai	(Thailand) Suakim Sor.Jor.Tongprajin	def.	(Russia) Vladimir Kuzmin	Decision (unanimous)	3	3:00	
Strawweight MMA	(Japan) Hiroba Minowa	def.	(Armenia) Karen Ghazaryan	Submission (rear-naked choke)	1	4:07	
Flyweight Muay Thai	(Thailand) Black Panther VenumMuaythai	def.	(United States) Diego Paez	Decision (split)	3	5:00	Paez missed weight (140.4 lb).
Welterweight Submission Grappling	(Canada) Dante Leon	def.	(Japan) Kenta Iwamoto	Decision (unanimous)	1	10:00	
Flyweight MMA	(United States) Joshua Perreira	def.	(United States) Gilbert Nakatani	KO (spinning backfist and punches)	1	0:38	
Bantamweight Muay Thai	(Russia) Dmitrii Kovtun	def.	(Iraq) Mohanad Battbootti	Decision (unanimous)	3	3:00	Battbootti missed weight (148.6 lb).

== ONE Friday Fights 151 & The Inner Circle 11 ==
ONE Friday Fights 151: Panpadej vs. Hussain / The Inner Circle 11
- Promotion: ONE Championship
- Date: April 24, 2026
- Venue: Lumpinee Boxing Stadium
- City: Bangkok, Thailand

ONE Friday Fights 151: Panpadej vs. Hussain (also known as ONE Lumpinee 151) / The Inner Circle 11 was a combat sports event produced by ONE Championship that took place on April 24, 2026, at Lumpinee Boxing Stadium in Bangkok, Thailand.

=== Background ===
A flyweight Muay Thai bout between Panpadej N.F.Looksuan and Ubaid Hussain was headlined the event.

=== Bonus awards ===
The following fighters received $10,000 bonuses:

- Performance of the Night: Martín Parra, Klinphaka Por.Thaisong, Ricardo Sanchez, Carlo Bumina-ang and Chen Jiayi

=== Results ===
ONE Friday Fights 151 (YouTube / Facebook)
Weight Class				Method	Round	Time	Notes
Flyweight Muay Thai	(Pakistan) Ubaid Hussain	def.	(Thailand) Panpadej N.F.Looksuan	Decision (unanimous)	3	3:00	
Flyweight Muay Thai	(Thailand) Petmuangsri Torfunfarm	def.	(Thailand) Chankrit Manopgym	Decision (unanimous)	3	3:00	
Flyweight Muay Thai	(Thailand) Lamsing T1.Fight Academy	def.	(Uzbekistan) Fakhriddin Khasanov	Decision (unanimous)	3	3:00	
Atomweight Muay Thai	(Ecuador) Martín Parra	def.	(Thailand) Petmuangthai Sor.Naruemon	KO (punch)	2	2:36	
Lightweight MMA	(Finland) Niko Aikonen	def.	(Georgia (country)) Ruslan Bolkvadze	Decision (unanimous)	3	5:00	
Women's Atomweight Muay Thai	(Thailand) Klinphaka Por.Thaisong	def.	(Thailand) Kati Mor.Rajabhatkorat	KO (knee)	2	1:29	
Strawweight Kickboxing	(Mexico) Ricardo Sanchez	def.	(Japan) Ryuki Kawano	TKO (punches)	1	2:36	
Strawweight MMA	(Australia) Rory Turner	def.	(Vietnam) Thoan Nguyen Thanh	Decision (split)	3	5:00	

The Inner Circle 11 (Superfans at Live ONE)
Weight Class				Method	Round	Time	Notes
Atomweight Muay Thai	(Thailand) Pet Suanluangrodyok	def.	(France) Nahyan Mohammed	Decision (unanimous)	3	3:00	
Bantamweight MMA	(Philippines) Carlo Bumina-ang	def.	(Mongolia) Batochir Batsaikhan	KO (punches)	1	2:28	
Flyweight Kickboxing	(China) Chen Jiayi	def.	(Thailand) Donking Yotharakmuaythai	KO (body kick)	1	1:27	
Women's Atomweight Kickboxing	(Netherlands) Tessa De Kom	def.	(Italy) Giorgia Pieropan	Decision (unanimous)	3	3:00	
Strawweight Kickboxing	(Japan) Reiji Takaki	def.	(China) Sheng Yihang	Decision (unanimous)	3	3:00	

== ONE Samurai 1 ==
ONE Samurai 1
- Promotion: ONE Championship
- Date: April 29, 2026
- Venue: Ariake Arena
- City: Tokyo, Japan

ONE Samurai 1 was a combat sports event produced by ONE Championship that took place on April 29, 2026, at Ariake Arena in Tokyo, Japan.

=== Background ===
An interim ONE Flyweight Kickboxing World Championship bout between Former ONE Flyweight Muay Thai World champion Rodtang Jitmuangnon and Former 3 Division K-1 Champion Takeru Segawa headlined the event. The pairing previously met at ONE 172 in March 2025, which Rodtang won by knockout in first round.

A ONE Flyweight World Championship bout between current champion Yuya Wakamatsu and Avazbek Kholmirzaev served as the event.

A ONE Atomweight Muay Thai World Championship bout between current champion Nadaka Yoshinari and Songchainoi Kiatsongrit served as the event.

A ONE Bantamweight Kickboxing World Championship bout between current champion (also former ONE Bantamweight and Flyweight Muay Thai World champion) Jonathan Haggerty and Yuki Yoza served as the event.

=== Bonus awards ===
The following fighters received bonuses:

- Performance of the Night ($95,000): Takeru Segawa
- Performance of the Night ($45,000): Avazbek Kholmirzaev
- Performance of the Night ($30,000): Marat Grigorian, Chihiro Sawada, Itsuki Hirata, Shimon Yoshinari
- Performance of the Night ($9,500): Keito Yamakita

=== Results ===
ONE Samurai 1 (PPV at Live ONE)
Weight Class				Method	Round	Time	Notes
Flyweight Kickboxing	(Japan) Takeru Segawa	def.	(Thailand) Rodtang Jitmuangnon	TKO (punches)	5	2:22	For the interim ONE Flyweight Kickboxing World Championship.
Flyweight MMA	(Uzbekistan) Avazbek Kholmirzaev	def.	(Japan) Yuya Wakamatsu (c)	KO (spinning back elbow)	2	4:53	For the ONE Flyweight World Championship.
Atomweight Muay Thai	(Japan) Nadaka Yoshinari (c)	def.	(Thailand) Songchainoi Kiatsongrit	Decision (unanimous)	5	3:00	For the ONE Atomweight Muay Thai World Championship.
Bantamweight Kickboxing	(United Kingdom) Jonathan Haggerty (c)	def.	(Japan) Yuki Yoza	Decision (unanimous)	5	3:00	For the ONE Bantamweight Kickboxing World Championship.
Featherweight Kickboxing	(Armenia) Marat Grigorian	def.	(Japan) Kaito Ono	KO (punch)	1	1:51	
Women's Atomweight MMA	(Japan) Chihiro Sawada	def.	(Japan) Ayaka Miura	Submission (armbar)	1	4:33	
Bantamweight Kickboxing	(Japan) Hiroki Akimoto	def.	(Japan) Taimu Hisai	Decision (split)	3	3:00	Hisai missed weight (147.4 lb).
Featherweight Kickboxing	(Japan) Hiromi Wajima	def.	(Argentina) Ricardo Bravo	Decision (unanimous)	3	3:00	
Women's Atomweight MMA	(Japan) Itsuki Hirata	def.	(India) Ritu Phogat	Submission (rear-naked choke)	3	2:42	Phogat missed weight (117.4 lb).
Flyweight MMA	(Japan) Tatsumitsu Wada	def.	(Japan) Seiichiro Ito	Decision (split)	3	5:00	
Strawweight MMA	(Japan) Keito Yamakita	def.	(Japan) Ryohei Kurosawa	Submission (armbar)	2	1:31	
Flyweight Muay Thai	(Japan) Shimon Yoshinari	def.	(Malaysia) Johan Ghazali	Decision (unanimous)	3	3:00	
Atomweight Kickboxing	(Japan) Toki Tamaru	def.	(Japan) Toma Kuroda	Decision (unanimous)	3	3:00	
Flyweight Kickboxing	(Japan) Taiki Naito	def.	(Japan) Hyu Iwata	Decision (unanimous)	3	3:00	
Bantamweight MMA	(Japan) Kanata Nagai	def.	(Japan) Atsubo Kambe	Decision (unanimous)	3	5:00	

== ONE Friday Fights 152 & The Inner Circle 12 ==
ONE Friday Fights 152: Kongklai vs. Lobo / The Inner Circle 12
- Promotion: ONE Championship
- Date: May 1, 2026
- Venue: Lumpinee Boxing Stadium
- City: Bangkok, Thailand

ONE Friday Fights 152: Kongklai vs. Lobo (also known as ONE Lumpinee 152) / The Inner Circle 12 was a combat sports event produced by ONE Championship that took place on May 1, 2026, at Lumpinee Boxing Stadium in Bangkok, Thailand.

=== Background ===
A bantamweight Muay Thai bout between Kongklai Sor.Sommai and Julio Lobo was headlined the event.

=== Bonus awards ===
The following fighters received $10,000 bonuses:

- Performance of the Night: Arsoonnoi Sitjasing, Tepkamin Thanapolresort, Petsamart Muangphaphum, Natalia Diachkova, Elbrus Osmanov and Dzhamil Osmanov

=== Results ===
ONE Friday Fights 152 (YouTube / Facebook)
Weight Class				Method	Round	Time	Notes
Bantamweight Muay Thai	(Brazil) Julio Lobo	def.	(Thailand) Kongklai Sor.Sommai	Decision (unanimous)	3	3:00	
Bantamweight Muay Thai	(Thailand) Panrit Lukjaomaesaiwaree	def.	(Thailand) Krisana Daodenmuaythai	Decision (unanimous)	3	3:00	
Strawweight Muay Thai	(Thailand) Singsuek Sakanupong	def.	(Thailand) Petchakrit Gavingym	Decision (unanimous)	3	3:00	
Strawweight Muay Thai	(Thailand) Face Erawan	def.	(Thailand) Payakmuangsing P.K.Saenchai	KO (punches)	2	0:52	
Flyweight Muay Thai	(Thailand) Arsoonnoi Sitjasing	def.	(Thailand) Suajan Sor.Isarachot	KO (elbow)	3	0:17	
Strawweight Muay Thai	(Thailand) Tepkamin Thanapolresort	def.	(Myanmar) Dawit T1.FightAcademy	KO (punches)	2	0:54	
Strawweight Muay Thai	(Thailand) Petsamart Muangphaphum	def.	(Thailand) Jaipet Patcharagym	KO (punches)	1	1:49	
Women's Strawweight Muay Thai	(Russia) Natalia Diachkova	def.	(Thailand) Fahsai Or.Yuthachai	KO (punches)	1	1:17	

The Inner Circle 12 (Superfans at Live ONE)
Weight Class				Method	Round	Time	Notes
Featherweight Muay Thai	(Russia) Elbrus Osmanov	def.	(Thailand) Ratchasiesan Laochokcharoen	TKO (punches)	1	2:17	
Women's Atomweight Muay Thai	(Thailand) Duangdawnoi Looksaikongdin	def.	(Hong Kong) Yana Yip	Decision (unanimous)	3	3:00	
Bantamweight Muay Thai	(Thailand) Suksawat P.K.Saenchai	def.	(Sweden) Linus Bylander	Decision (unanimous)	3	3:00	
Bantamweight Kickboxing	(Russia) Dzhamil Osmanov	def.	(South Korea) Cho Kyeong-jae	KO (body kick)	1	0:52	
Atomweight Muay Thai	(Japan) Riku Ito	def.	(Thailand) Chatpet Suablackmuaythai	Decision (split)	3	3:00	

== ONE Friday Fights 153 & The Inner Circle 13 ==
ONE Friday Fights 153: Worapon vs. Casse / The Inner Circle 13
- Promotion: ONE Championship
- Date: May 8, 2026
- Venue: Lumpinee Boxing Stadium
- City: Bangkok, Thailand

ONE Friday Fights 153: Worapon vs. Casse (also known as ONE Lumpinee 153) / The Inner Circle 13 was a combat sports event produced by ONE Championship that took place on May 8, 2026, at Lumpinee Boxing Stadium in Bangkok, Thailand.

=== Background ===
A bantamweight Muay Thai bout between Worapon Lukjaoporongtom and Tom Casse was headlined the event.

=== Bonus awards ===
The following fighters received $10,000 bonuses:

- Performance of the Night: Mohamed Taoufyq, Adam Benwarwar and Hern N.F.Looksuan

=== Results ===
ONE Friday Fights 153 (YouTube / Facebook)
Weight Class				Method	Round	Time	Notes
Bantamweight Muay Thai	(Thailand) Worapon Lukjaoporongtom	def.	(France) Tom Casse	Decision (unanimous)	3	3:00	
Bantamweight Muay Thai	(Thailand) Dedduanglek Torfunfarm	def.	(Thailand) Cyber Sor.Tienpo	Decision (unanimous)	3	3:00	
Flyweight Muay Thai	(Thailand) Khunponnoi Sor.Sommai	def.	(Myanmar) Ye Yint Naung	KO (punch to the body)	2	2:14	
Flyweight Muay Thai	(Morocco) Mohamed Taoufyq	def.	(Thailand) Kaewkangwan Torfunfarm	KO (punches)	2	2:53	
Bantamweight Muay Thai	(Morocco) Adam Benwarwar	def.	(United States) Kendu Irving	KO (punch)	1	0:52	
Atomweight Muay Thai	(Thailand) Hern N.F.Looksuan	def.	(Turkey) Cihan Dogu	TKO (head kick and punches)	2	2:02	
Women's Flyweight Muay Thai	(Switzerland) Zoe Neuschwander	def.	(Canada) Taylor McClatchie	Decision (split)	3	3:00	
Flyweight Muay Thai	(Mexico) Aldo Cruz	def.	(Malaysia) Wan Muhammad Sabri	TKO (punch)	1	2:00	
Bantamweight MMA	(South Korea) Park Jong-jun	def.	(Japan) Junpei Nagatome	TKO (punches)	1	3:03	

The Inner Circle 13 (Superfans at Live ONE)
Weight Class				Method	Round	Time	Notes
Strawweight Muay Thai	(Malaysia) Adam Sor.Dechapan	def.	(France) Enzo Clarisse	Decision (unanimous)	3	3:00	
Atomweight Muay Thai	(Malaysia) Rifdean Masdor	def.	(Laos) Petkiattisak Or.Saensuek	Decision (unanimous)	3	3:00	
Strawweight Muay Thai	(Thailand) Chartpayak Saksatoon	def.	(Myanmar) Thway Lin Thet	Decision (unanimous)	3	3:00	Chartpayak missed weight (129.4 lb).
Lightweight Muay Thai	(Thailand) Petkhaokradong Lukjaomaesaithong	def.	(Brazil) Victor Hugo	Decision (unanimous)	3	3:00	
Bantamweight Submission Grappling	(Japan) Daiki Yonekura	def.	(Brazil) Rodrigo Marello	Decision (unanimous)	1	10:00	

== ONE Friday Fights 154 & The Inner Circle 14 ==
ONE Friday Fights 154: Samingdam vs. Yodphupa / The Inner Circle 14
- Promotion: ONE Championship
- Date: May 15, 2026
- Venue: Lumpinee Boxing Stadium
- City: Bangkok, Thailand

ONE Friday Fights 154: Samingdam vs. Yodphupa (also known as ONE Lumpinee 154) / The Inner Circle 14 was a combat sports event produced by ONE Championship that took place on May 15, 2026, at Lumpinee Boxing Stadium in Bangkok, Thailand.

=== Background ===
A bantamweight Muay Thai bout between Samingdam N.F.Looksuan and Yodphupa Petkiatpet was headlined the event.

=== Bonus awards ===
The following fighters received bonuses:

- Performance of the Night ($100,000): Anatoly Malykhin
- Performance of the Night ($50,000): Kade Ruotolo
- Performance of the Night ($10,000): Elvin Mammadov and Mahesuan Aekmuangnon

=== Results ===
ONE Friday Fights 154 (YouTube / Facebook)
Weight Class				Method	Round	Time	Notes
Bantamweight Muay Thai	(Thailand) Samingdam N.F.Looksuan	def.	(Thailand) Yodphupa Petkiatpet	Decision (unanimous)	3	3:00	Samingdam missed weight (142 lb).
Strawweight Muay Thai	(Thailand) Rungnarai Kiatmuu9	def.	(Thailand) Den Sitnayoktaweeptaphong	Decision (unanimous)	3	3:00	
Flyweight Muay Thai	(Azerbaijan) Elvin Mammadov	def.	(Thailand) Sanit Aekmuangnon	TKO (punch to the body)	2	2:56	
Strawweight Muay Thai	(Laos) Anouwat Merlet	def.	(Thailand) Dafi Sor.Dechapan	Decision (unanimous)	3	3:00	
Flyweight Muay Thai	(Thailand) Saenmuangnoi P.K.Saenchai	def.	(Malaysia) Asura Thiagesh	Decision (unanimous)	3	3:00	
Atomweight Muay Thai	(Thailand) Mahesuan Aekmuangnon	def.	(Myanmar) Aung Tun Bo	TKO (punches to the body)	2	2:50	
Featherweight Kickboxing	(Turkey) Semih Sah Cindir	def.	(China) Wang Penghui	Decision (split)	3	3:00	
Flyweight Muay Thai	(Myanmar) Sulaiman N.F.Looksuan	def.	(Spain) Juan Martinez	Decision (majority)	3	3:00	
Bantamweight Kickboxing	(Ukraine) Denis Dotsenko	def.	(Japan) Hiroki Suzuki	TKO (leg injury)	1	1:35	

The Inner Circle 14 (Superfans at Live ONE)
Weight Class				Method	Round	Time	Notes
Heavyweight MMA	(Russia) Anatoly Malykhin	def.	(Senegal) Oumar Kane (c)	KO (punches)	4	1:54	For the ONE Heavyweight World Championship.
Lightweight MMA	(United States) Kade Ruotolo	def.	(Japan) Hiroyuki Tetsuka	KO (punches)	2	2:02	
Bantamweight Muay Thai	(Russia) Abdulla Dayakaev	def.	(Thailand) Superlek Kiatmuu9	Decision (split)	3	3:00	Dayakaev missed weight (148.2 lb).
Women's Atomweight Muay Thai	(United Kingdom) Mia Trevorrow	def.	(Japan) Koko Ohara	Decision (unanimous)	3	3:00	

== ONE Fight Night 43 ==
ONE Fight Night 43: Tang vs. Gasanov
- Promotion: ONE Championship
- Date: May 16, 2026
- Venue: Lumpinee Boxing Stadium
- City: Bangkok, Thailand

ONE Fight Night 43: Tang vs. Gasanov was a combat sports event produced by ONE Championship that took place on May 16, 2026, at Lumpinee Boxing Stadium in Bangkok, Thailand.

=== Background ===
A ONE Featherweight World Championship bout between current champion Tang Kai and Shamil Gasanov headlined the event.

At the weigh-ins, one fighter failed to hydration test and missed weight for their respective fights:

- Nonthachai Jitmuangnon weighted in at 146.8 pounds, 1.8 pounds over the bantamweight limit and he was fined 30 percent of his purse which went to Felipe Lobo.

=== Bonus awards ===
The following fighters received $50,000 bonuses:

- Performance of the Night ($50,000): Tang Kai

=== Results ===
ONE Fight Night 43 (Amazon Prime Video)
Weight Class				Method	Round	Time	Notes
Featherweight MMA	(China) Tang Kai (c)	def.	(Russia) Shamil Gasanov	TKO (leg kick and punches)	4	2:41	For the ONE Featherweight World Championship.
Bantamweight Kickboxing	(Thailand) Petchtanong Petchfergus	def.	(United Kingdom) Ben Woolliss	Decision (unanimous)	3	3:00	
Bantamweight Submission Grappling	(Brazil) Diogo Reis	def.	(Japan) Yuki Takahashi	Decision (unanimous)	1	10:00	
Flyweight Muay Thai	(Uzbekistan) Aslamjon Ortikov	def.	(Colombia) Jhordan Estupiñan	TKO (3 Knockdowns)	2	2:06	
Strawweight MMA	(Brazil) Fabio Henrique	def.	(Japan) Yosuke Saruta	TKO (elbow injury)	2	0:39	
Bantamweight Muay Thai	(Thailand) Nonthachai Jitmuangnon	def.	(Brazil) Felipe Lobo	Decision (unanimous)	3	3:00	Nonthachai missed weight (146.8 lb).
Bantamweight MMA	(Philippines) Lito Adiwang	def.	(Indonesia) Eko Roni Saputra	TKO (punches)	1	0:34	
Featherweight Kickboxing	(China) Luo Chao	def.	(Brazil) Denis Souza Jr.	Decision (split)	3	3:00	
Women's Atomweight Muay Thai	(Poland) Martyna Domińczak	def.	(Sweden) Johanna Persson	Decision (unanimous)	3	3:00	

== ONE Friday Fights 155 & The Inner Circle 15 ==
ONE Friday Fights 155: Decho vs. Yunusov / The Inner Circle 15
- Promotion: ONE Championship
- Date: May 22, 2026
- Venue: Lumpinee Boxing Stadium
- City: Bangkok, Thailand

ONE Friday Fights 155: Decho vs. Yunusov (also known as ONE Lumpinee 155) / The Inner Circle 15 was a combat sports event produced by ONE Championship that took place on May 22, 2026, at Lumpinee Boxing Stadium in Bangkok, Thailand.

=== Background ===
A flyweight Muay Thai bout between Decho Por.Borirak and Rustam Yunusov was headlined the event.

=== Bonus awards ===
The following fighters received $10,000 bonuses:

- Performance of the Night: Chokpreecha P.K.TomTK.Alaiyont, Rungruanglek TN.Muaythai, Ranma and Viet Anh Do

=== Results ===
ONE Friday Fights 155 (YouTube / Facebook)
Weight Class				Method	Round	Time	Notes
Flyweight Muay Thai	(Russia) Rustam Yunusov	def.	(Thailand) Decho Por.Borirak	Decision (unanimous)	3	3:00	
Bantamweight Kickboxing	(Thailand) Panpayak Jitmuangnon	def.	(Morocco) Othman Rhouni	Decision (split)	3	3:00	
Strawweight Muay Thai	(Thailand) Dokmaipa Santiubon	def.	(Thailand) Kohtao Petsomnuk	Decision (unanimous)	3	3:00	
Strawweight Muay Thai	(Thailand) Chokpreecha P.K.TomTK.Alaiyont	def.	(Vietnam) Huynh Van Tuan	TKO (knees and punches)	2	2:28	
Flyweight Muay Thai	(Thailand) Rungruanglek TN.Muaythai	def.	(Thailand) Terdkiat Sitjaekarn	TKO (punch)	1	2:45	
Atomweight Muay Thai	(Thailand) Kwangpa Teenoikachin	def.	(Thailand) Kom P.K.Saenchai	Decision (split)	3	3:00	
Strawweight Kickboxing	(Japan) Shoma Okumura	def.	(China) Sheng Yizhuo	Decision (unanimous)	3	3:00	
Bantamweight Kickboxing	(Japan) Ranma	def.	(China) Yi Nuo	KO (punch to the body)	1	1:03	

The Inner Circle 15 (Superfans at Live ONE)
Weight Class				Method	Round	Time	Notes
Bantamweight Muay Thai	(Thailand) Yod-IQ Or.Pimolsri	def.	(Russia) Kiamran Nabati	Decision (split)	3	3:00	
Featherweight Kickboxing	(China) Liu Mengyang	def.	(Venezuela) Gabriel Pereira	Decision (unanimous)	3	3:00	
Strawweight Muay Thai	(United Kingdom) Freddie Haggerty	def.	(France) Yonis Anane	Decision (unanimous)	3	3:00	
Women's Atomweight Kickboxing	(Myanmar) Vero Nika	def.	(Japan) Kana Morimoto	Decision (unanimous)	3	3:00	
Flyweight MMA	(Vietnam) Viet Anh Do	def.	(South Korea) Kim Kyung-jung	TKO (punches to the body)	2	2:17	

== ONE Friday Fights 156 & The Inner Circle 16 ==
ONE Friday Fights 156: Kongsuk vs. Anisjon / The Inner Circle 16
- Promotion: ONE Championship
- Date: May 29, 2026
- Venue: Lumpinee Boxing Stadium
- City: Bangkok, Thailand

ONE Friday Fights 156: Kongsuk vs. Anisjon (also known as ONE Lumpinee 156) / The Inner Circle 16 was a combat sports event produced by ONE Championship that took place on May 29, 2026, at Lumpinee Boxing Stadium in Bangkok, Thailand.

=== Background ===
A bantamweight Muay Thai bout between Kongsuk Fairtex and Khakimov Anisjon was headlined the event.

=== Bonus awards ===
The following fighters received $10,000 bonuses:

- Performance of the Night: Bakjo Sitkhunma, Kosei Yoshida, Abdallah Ondash and Yuto Hirayama

=== Results ===
ONE Friday Fights 156 (YouTube / Facebook)
Weight Class				Method	Round	Time	Notes
Bantamweight Muay Thai	(Thailand) Kongsuk Fairtex	def.	(Uzbekistan) Khakimov Anisjon	KO (punch to the body)	3	2:17	
Bantamweight Muay Thai	(Thailand) Mongkoldetlek Por.Pim-on	def.	(Russia) Ruslan Tuktarov	Decision (unanimous)	3	3:00	
Flyweight Kickboxing	(Thailand) Petmuangsri Torfunfarm	def.	(Cape Verde) Diogo Miguel Silva	Decision (split)	3	3:00	
Flyweight Muay Thai	(Laos) Songpandin Chor.Kaewwiset	def.	(Thailand) Guanyu Sor.Ratchanikul	Decision (unanimous)	3	3:00	
Atomweight Muay Thai	(Thailand) Bakjo Sitkhunma	def.	(Thailand) Tandiao Por.Prawit	KO (punches)	2	1:02	
Bantamweight Muay Thai	(Thailand) Petbangsaray Por.Aowtalaybangsaray	def.	(Thailand) Wanchana Bomuangpan	Decision (unanimous)	3	3:00	
Strawweight MMA	(Tajikistan) Parviz Khamidzhonov	def.	(India) Monjit Yein	Technical Submission (rear-naked choke)	1	0:26	
Flyweight Kickboxing	(Japan) Kosei Yoshida	def.	(Vietnam) Hoang Gia Dai	KO (punch)	3	2:02	

The Inner Circle 16 (Superfans at Live ONE)
Weight Class				Method	Round	Time	Notes
Flyweight Muay Thai	(Lebanon) Ramadan Ondash	def.	(Thailand) Suriyanlek Por.Yenying	Decision (unanimous)	3	3:00	
Strawweight Muay Thai	(Lebanon) Abdallah Ondash	def.	(Thailand) Denkriangkrai MavinnMuaythai	KO (punch)	1	1:37	
Women's Atomweight Muay Thai	(Turkey) Zeynep Cetintas	def.	(Thailand) Tangtang Sor.Dechapan	Decision (split)	3	3:00	
Atomweight Kickboxing	(Japan) Yuto Hirayama	def.	(Chinese Taipei) Li-Chih Yeh	TKO (punches)	1	1:48	
Flyweight MMA	(Kyrgyzstan) Adilet Kalenderov	def.	(South Korea) Jang Seong-gyu	Decision (unanimous)	3	5:00	

== ONE Friday Fights 157 & The Inner Circle 17 ==
ONE Friday Fights 157: Yodlekpet vs. Saw Min Min / The Inner Circle 17
- Promotion: ONE Championship
- Date: June 5, 2026
- Venue: Lumpinee Boxing Stadium
- City: Bangkok, Thailand

ONE Friday Fights 157: Yodlekpet vs. Saw Min Min (also known as ONE Lumpinee 157) / The Inner Circle 17 was a combat sports event produced by ONE Championship that took place on June 5, 2026, at Lumpinee Boxing Stadium in Bangkok, Thailand.

=== Background ===
A flyweight Muay Thai bout between Yodlekpet Or.Atchariya and Saw Min Min was headlined the event.

=== Bonus awards ===
The following fighters received $10,000 bonuses:

- Performance of the Night: Xavier Gonzalez, Tepatip ChampKhaomootod, Nazareth Lalthazuala, Kongchai Chanaidonmuang, Banluelok Sitwatcharachai and Taiga Orii

=== Results ===
ONE Friday Fights 157 (YouTube / Facebook)
Weight Class				Method	Round	Time	Notes
Flyweight Muay Thai	(Thailand) Yodlekpet Or.Atchariya	def.	(Myanmar) Saw Min Min	Decision (unanimous)	3	3:00	
Strawweight Muay Thai	(Spain) Xavier Gonzalez	def.	(Thailand) Payaksurin JP.Power	KO (punch)	1	1:10	
Bantamweight Muay Thai	(Thailand) Kajornklai Sor.Sor.Toipadriew	def.	(Laos) Lamnamkhong BS.Muaythai	Decision (unanimous)	3	3:00	
Strawweight Muay Thai	(Thailand) Petkongfa Wor.Technoluangpusuang	def.	(Thailand) Jomhod Wor.Uracha	Decision (majority)	3	3:00	
Strawweight Muay Thai	(Thailand) Tepatip ChampKhaoMooTod	def.	(Thailand) Krungthai Torfunfarm	KO (punch)	1	1:48	
Women's Atomweight Muay Thai	(Thailand) Nongnuk Sor.Dechapan	def.	(Spain) Alicia Sanchez Saez	Decision (unanimous)	3	3:00	
Lightweight Muay Thai	(Iran) Mahan Fotouhi	def.	(United Kingdom) Tayo Zahir	TKO (finger injury)	1	1:37	
Flyweight Muay Thai	(United Kingdom) Jacob Thompson	def.	(Japan) Takuma Ota	Decision (unanimous)	3	3:00	
Strawweight MMA	(India) Nazareth Lalthazuala	def.	(Philippines) Jhon Brutas	TKO (punches)	1	4:09	

The Inner Circle 17 (Superfans at Live ONE)
Weight Class				Method	Round	Time	Notes
Strawweight Muay Thai	(Thailand) Kongchai Chanaidonmuang	def.	(Moldova) Valerii Strungari	KO (knee)	1	1:32	Strungari missed weight (125.4 lb).
Flyweight Kickboxing	(China) Yuan Pengjie	def.	(Thailand) Jaosuayai Mor. Krungthepthonburi	Decision (unanimous)	3	3:00	
Atomweight Muay Thai	(Thailand) Banluelok Sitwatcharachai	def.	(Thailand) Rak Erawan	KO (punch)	3	1:21	
Flyweight Kickboxing	(Belgium) Rahim Tcherchaiko	def.	(China) Zhang Jinhu	Decision (unanimous)	3	3:00	Zhang missed weight (135.8 lb).
Bantamweight MMA	(Japan) Taiga Orii	def.	(United States) Julian Mayorga	TKO (punches)	1	3:03	Mayorga missed weight (148.2 lb).

== ONE Friday Fights 158 & The Inner Circle 18 ==
ONE Friday Fights 158: Maisangkum vs. Petnamkhong / The Inner Circle 18
- Promotion: ONE Championship
- Date: June 12, 2026
- Venue: Lumpinee Boxing Stadium
- City: Bangkok, Thailand

ONE Friday Fights 158: Maisangkum vs. Petnamkhong (also known as ONE Lumpinee 158) / The Inner Circle 18 was a combat sports event produced by ONE Championship that took place on June 12, 2026, at Lumpinee Boxing Stadium in Bangkok, Thailand.

=== Background ===
A strawweight Muay Thai bout between Maisangkum Sor.Yingcharoenkarnchang and Petnamkhong Sor.Maneekhot was headlined the event.

=== Bonus awards ===
The following fighters received $10,000 bonuses:

- Performance of the Night: Petphupa Aekpujean

=== Results ===
ONE Friday Fights 158 (YouTube / Facebook)
Weight Class				Method	Round	Time	Notes
Strawweight Muay Thai	(Laos) Petnamkhong Sor.Maneekhot	def.	(Thailand) Maisangkum Sor.Yingcharoenkarnchang	Decision (unanimous)	3	3:00	
Featherweight Kickboxing	(Russia) Mamuka Usubyan	def.	(France) Enzo Kartoum	Decision (unanimous)	3	3:00	
Bantamweight Muay Thai	(Myanmar) Kyaw Swar Win	def.	(Thailand) Slatan Jitmuangnon	Decision (unanimous)	3	3:00	
Flyweight Muay Thai	(Thailand) Petphupa Aekpujean	def.	(Thailand) Wuttidet Torfunfarm	KO (head kick)	2	2:17	
Atomweight Muay Thai	(Thailand) YodUdon K.Tongtalingchan	def.	(Thailand) Tepkamin Thanapolresort	Decision (unanimous)	3	3:00	
Flyweight Muay Thai	(Thailand) Petsuphan Lookmuangpet	def.	(Thailand) Rawee Puanpratuphee	Decision (unanimous)	3	3:00	
Strawweight Muay Thai	(Mexico) Ricardo Sanchez	def.	(France) Yanis Ben Alaya	Decision (unanimous)	3	3:00	
Women's Atomweight Muay Thai	(Thailand) Ploychan Sitnayokdam	def.	(Argentina) Sheila Barrios	Decision (unanimous)	3	3:00	
Flyweight Kickboxing	(Japan) Kazuteru Yamazaki	def.	(China) Chen Jiayi	Decision (majority)	3	3:00	

The Inner Circle 18 (Superfans at Live ONE)
Weight Class				Method	Round	Time	Notes
Flyweight Muay Thai	(Thailand) Tomyamkoong Bhumjaithai	def.	(Azerbaijan) Anar Mammadov	Decision (unanimous)	3	3:00	
Flyweight Muay Thai	(Thailand) Rambong Sor.Therapat	def.	(Thailand) Sornsueknoi FA.Group	Decision (split)	3	3:00	
Lightweight Muay Thai	(New Zealand) Titus Proctor	def.	(Myanmar) Tun Min Aung	Decision (unanimous)	3	3:00	
Strawweight Kickboxing	(Japan) Sora Tanazawa	def.	(Uzbekistan) Adham Ruziev	Decision (split)	3	3:00	
Featherweight MMA	(New Zealand) Ethan Brockett	def.	(Japan) Sora Enmei	Decision (unanimous)	3	5:00	

== ONE Friday Fights 159 & The Inner Circle 19 ==
ONE Friday Fights 159: Gonzalez vs. Chatanan / The Inner Circle 19
- Promotion: ONE Championship
- Date: June 19, 2026
- Venue: Lumpinee Boxing Stadium
- City: Bangkok, Thailand

ONE Friday Fights 159: Gonzalez vs. Chatanan (also known as ONE Lumpinee 159) / The Inner Circle 19 was a combat sports event produced by ONE Championship that took place on June 19, 2026, at Lumpinee Boxing Stadium in Bangkok, Thailand.

=== Background ===
A bantamweight Muay Thai bout between Worapon Lukjaoporongtom and Lenny Blasi was scheduled to headline the event. but the bout was canceled after Worapon has medical not cleared.therefore, a flyweight Muay Thai bout between Xavier Gonzalez and Chatanan Sor.Jor.Joyprajin headlined the event.

=== Bonus awards ===
The following fighters received $10,000 bonuses:

- Performance of the Night: Xavier Gonzalez, Denis Dotsenko, Kritpet P.K.Saenchai, Rifdean Masdor and Olivia Bahsous

=== Results ===
ONE Friday Fights 159 (YouTube / Facebook)
Weight Class				Method	Round	Time	Notes
Flyweight Muay Thai	(Spain) Xavier Gonzalez	def.	(Thailand) Chatanan Sor.Jor.Joyprajin	KO (punch)	2	1:37	
Bantamweight Muay Thai	(Ukraine) Denis Dotsenko	def.	(Thailand) Petgarfield Jitmuangnon	KO (punch)	2	1:09	
Flyweight Muay Thai	(Thailand) Kritpet P.K.Saenchai	def.	(Thailand) Petlampun Muadablampang	KO (punch)	2	0:45	
Atomweight Muay Thai	(Thailand) Teeyai Torfunfarm	def.	(Myanmar) Har Ling Om	Decision (unanimous)	3	3:00	
Bantamweight Kickboxing	(France) Arthur Klopp	def.	(Turkey) Şoner Şen	TKO (leg injury)	2	2:00	
Strawweight Muay Thai	(Thailand) Gaichon Sor.Prawatmuang	def.	(Thailand) Nuapatapee Pudprachachuen	KO (punch)	1	1:57	
Bantamweight MMA	(Thailand) Bos Chayut	def.	(Chinese Taipei) Liao Hsiang	Decision (split)	3	5:00	
Flyweight Kickboxing	(Morocco) Walid Sakhraji	def.	(Japan) Kakeru	Decision (unanimous)	3	3:00	
Lightweight MMA	(Australia) Sarmad Jahanara	def.	(Japan) Ryo Goto	TKO (elbows and knees)	2	2:53	

The Inner Circle 19 (Superfans at Live ONE)
Weight Class				Method	Round	Time	Notes
Women's Atomweight Muay Thai	(Brazil) Allycia Rodrigues (c)	def.	(Thailand) Phetjeeja Lukjaoporongtom	Decision (split)	5	3:00	For the ONE Women's Atomweight Muay Thai World Championship.
Heavyweight Kickboxing	(Ukraine) Roman Kryklia	def.	(Turkey) Samet Agdeve (c)	Decision (unanimous)	5	3:00	For the ONE Heavyweight Kickboxing World Championship.
Atomweight Muay Thai	(Malaysia) Rifdean Masdor	def.	(Iran) Javad Mozafari	KO (punch to the body)	1	1:34	
Women's Atomweight Muay Thai	(Canada) Olivia Bahsous	def.	(Thailand) Phontip Klongtoeiyouthcenter	TKO (punches)	1	1:29	

== ONE Friday Fights 160 & The Inner Circle 20 ==
ONE Friday Fights 160: Numsurin vs. Songchainoi 2 / The Inner Circle 20
- Promotion: ONE Championship
- Date: June 26, 2026
- Venue: Lumpinee Boxing Stadium
- City: Bangkok, Thailand

ONE Friday Fights 160: Numsurin vs. Songchainoi 2 (also known as ONE Lumpinee 160) / The Inner Circle 20 was a combat sports event produced by ONE Championship that took place on June 26, 2026, at Lumpinee Boxing Stadium in Bangkok, Thailand.

=== Background ===
An atomweight Muay Thai rematch between Numsurin Chor.Ketwina and Songchainoi Kiatsongrit was headlined the event. The pairing previously met at ONE Friday Fights 122 in August 2025, which Numsurin won by majority decision.

=== Bonus awards ===
The following fighters received $10,000 bonuses:

- Performance of the Night: Yodkhunpon Sitmonchai, Wanchainoi Sor.Tor.Hiewbangsaen, Ubaid Hussain, Ryuya Okuwaki and Julio Lobo

=== Results ===
ONE Friday Fights 160 (YouTube / Facebook)
Weight Class				Method	Round	Time	Notes
Atomweight Muay Thai	(Thailand) Numsurin Chor.Ketwina	def.	(Thailand) Songchainoi Kiatsongrit	Decision (unanimous)	3	3:00	
Bantamweight Muay Thai	(Thailand) Yodkhunpon Sitmonchai	def.	(Turkey) Semih Sah Cindir	KO (punch)	2	2:49	Cindir missed weight (148.2 lb).
Strawweight Muay Thai	(Thailand) Wanchainoi Sor.Tor.Hiewbangsaen	def.	(Thailand) Dokmaipa Santiubon	KO (punches)	1	0:54	
Flyweight Muay Thai	(Pakistan) Ubaid Hussain	def.	(Thailand) Sanpet Sor.Salacheep	TKO (punches and elbows)	1	2:31	
Flyweight Muay Thai	(Thailand) Chartpayak Saksatoon	def.	(Thailand) Panpadej N.F.Looksuan	Decision (split)	3	3:00	
Flyweight Muay Thai	(Thailand) Rungruanglek TN.Muaythai	def.	(Thailand) Face Erawan	Decision (unanimous)	3	3:00	
Atomweight Muay Thai	(Thailand) Pet Suanluangrodyok	def.	(Malaysia) Adam Sor.Dechapan	Decision (split)	3	3:00	
Strawweight Muay Thai	(Iraq) Ayad Albadr	def.	(Thailand) Saenmuangnoi P.K.Saenchai	Decision (unanimous)	3	3:00	
Atomweight Muay Thai	(Japan) Ryuya Okuwaki	def.	(Thailand) Hern N.F.Looksuan	KO (punches to the body)	2	1:14	

The Inner Circle 20 (Superfans at Live ONE)
Weight Class				Method	Round	Time	Notes
Flyweight Muay Thai	(Russia) Asadula Imangazaliev	def.	(Uzbekistan) Aslamjon Ortikov	Decision (split)	5	3:00	For the vacant ONE Flyweight Muay Thai World Championship.
Flyweight Muay Thai	(Thailand) Nong-O Hama	def.	(Thailand) Kongthoranee Sor.Sommai	Decision (unanimous)	3	3:00	
Bantamweight Muay Thai	(Brazil) Julio Lobo	def.	(Thailand) PTT Apichartfarm	TKO (punches)	2	2:02	
Women's Atomweight Muay Thai	(Thailand) Stamp Fairtex	def.	(Mexico) Cynthia Flores	Decision (split)	3	3:00	
Bantamweight Muay Thai	(Thailand) Panrit Lukjaomaesaiwaree	def.	(Thailand) Muangthai P.K.Saenchai	Decision (split)	3	3:00	

== ONE Fight Night 44 ==
ONE Fight Night 44: Jarvis vs. Rungrawee 2
- Promotion: ONE Championship
- Date: June 27, 2026
- Venue: Lumpinee Boxing Stadium
- City: Bangkok, Thailand

ONE Fight Night 44: Jarvis vs. Rungrawee 2 was a combat sports event produced by ONE Championship that took place on June 27, 2026, at Lumpinee Boxing Stadium in Bangkok, Thailand.

=== Background ===
A lightweight Muay Thai rematch between George Jarvis and Rungrawee Sitsongpeenong headlined the event. The pairing previously met at ONE Friday Fights 85 in November 2024, which Jarvis won by knockout in third round.

At the weigh-ins, four fighters failed to hydration test and missed weight for their respective fights:

- George Jarvis weighted in at 171.2 pounds, 1.2 pounds over the lightweight limit and he was fined 30 percent of his purse which went to Rungrawee Sitsongpeenong.
- Johan Estupiñan weighted in at 139.2 pounds, 4.2 pounds over the flyweight limit and he was fined 30 percent of his purse which went to Akif Guluzada.
- Charlie Guest weighted in at 160.2 pounds, 5.2 pounds over the featherweight limit and he was fined 30 percent of his purse which went to Samuel Fitzgerald.
- Owen Jones weighted in at 158.6 pounds, 3.6 pounds over the featherweight limit and he was fined 30 percent of his purse which went to Fabricio Andrey.

=== Results ===
ONE Fight Night 44 (Amazon Prime Video)
Weight Class				Method	Round	Time	Notes
Lightweight Muay Thai	(United Kingdom) George Jarvis	def.	(Thailand) Rungrawee Sitsongpeenong	KO (punch)	2	1:59	Jarvis missed weight (171.2 lb).
Lightweight MMA	(Brazil) Lucas Gabriel	def.	(South Korea) Ok Rae-yoon	Decision (split)	3	5:00	
Flyweight Kickboxing	(Colombia) Johan Estupiñan	def.	(Azerbaijan) Akif Guluzada	Decision (unanimous)	3	3:00	Estupiñan missed weight (139.2 lb).
Featherweight Muay Thai	(United Kingdom) Charlie Guest	def.	(New Zealand) Samuel Fitzgerald	TKO (punches)	2	2:08	Guest missed weight (160.2 lb).
Bantamweight Muay Thai	(Thailand) Nakrob Fairtex	def.	(United Kingdom) Jacob Smith	Decision (unanimous)	3	3:00	
Featherweight Submission Grappling	(United Kingdom) Owen Jones	def.	(Brazil) Fabricio Andrey	Decision (split)	1	10:00	Jones missed weight (158.6 lb).
Strawweight MMA	(Armenia) Karen Ghazaryan	def.	(Japan) Hisashi Ezaki	TKO (doctor stoppage)	1	5:00	
Bantamweight Muay Thai	(Thailand) Ferrari Fairtex	def.	(Japan) Shinji Suzuki	Decision (unanimous)	3	3:00	
Heavyweight MMA	(United Kingdom) Paul Elliott	def.	(United States) Regan Upshaw	KO (head kick)	1	0:06	

== ONE Friday Fights 161 & The Inner Circle 21 ==
ONE Friday Fights 161: Jaradchai vs. Rhouni / The Inner Circle 21
- Promotion: ONE Championship
- Date: July 10, 2026
- Venue: Lumpinee Boxing Stadium
- City: Bangkok, Thailand

ONE Friday Fights 161: Jaradchai vs. Rhouni (also known as ONE Lumpinee 161) / The Inner Circle 21 was a combat sports event produced by ONE Championship that took place on July 10, 2026, at Lumpinee Boxing Stadium in Bangkok, Thailand.

=== Background ===
A flyweight Muay Thai bout between Jaradchai Maxjandee and Othman Rhouni headlined the event.

=== Bonus awards ===
The following fighters received bonuses:

- Performance of the Night ($50,000): Joshua Pacio
- Performance of the Night ($10,000): Petchsiam Jor.Pattreya, Petsangwan Sor.Samarngarment, Tom Keogh, Kulabkaw Luksingnamchai, Go Todoroki, Sunvo Torfunfarm and Ali Kelat

=== Results ===
ONE Friday Fights 161 (YouTube / Facebook)
Weight Class				Method	Round	Time	Notes
Flyweight Muay Thai	(Thailand) Jaradchai Maxjandee	def.	(Morocco) Othman Rhouni	Decision (unanimous)	3	3:00	
Strawweight Kickboxing	(Thailand) Petchsiam Jor.Pattreya	def.	(Azerbaijan) Nihad Taghizade	TKO (kicks to the body)	1	1:53	
Strawweight Muay Thai	(Thailand) Petsangwan Sor.Samarngarment	def.	(Thailand) Tonglampoon FA.Group	KO (punches and knee to the head)	1	2:57	
Featherweight Muay Thai	(Republic of Ireland) Tom Keogh	def.	(Russia) Michael Baranov	KO (punches and knee to the head)	2	0:46	
Flyweight Muay Thai	(Thailand) Klarob Nuikafeboran	def.	(Lebanon) Omar El Halabi	Decision (unanimous)	3	3:00	
Bantamweight Muay Thai	(Thailand) Kulabkaw Luksingnamchai	def.	(Kuwait) Meshal Alsaeed	TKO (referee stoppage)	2	1:15	
Featherweight MMA	(Japan) Go Todoroki	def.	(France) Alexandre Khan	KO (punches)	1	3:22	
Flyweight Muay Thai	(Thailand) Sunvo Torfunfarm	def.	(Thailand) Khundet P.K. Saenchai	KO (head kick)	3	2:28	
Featherweight Submission Grappling	(Thailand) Phatiphan Arthinkong	def.	(Malaysia) J Han Tan	Decision (unanimous)	1	10:00	
Lightweight MMA	(South Korea) Kang Min-sung	def.	(Japan) Yusei Iwakura	KO (punches)	3	2:09	

The Inner Circle 21 (Superfans at Live ONE)
Weight Class				Method	Round	Time	Notes
Strawweight MMA	(Philippines) Joshua Pacio (c)	def.	(Russia) Mansur Malachiev	Submission (rear-naked choke)	1	4:23	For the ONE Strawweight World Championship.
Lightweight MMA	(Japan) Shozo Isojima	def.	(Philippines) Eduard Folayang	TKO (punches)	1	4:29	
Bantamweight Muay Thai	(Thailand) Detchawalit Silkmuaythai	def.	(France) Tom Casse	Decision (unanimous)	3	3:00	
Featherweight Muay Thai	(Turkey) Ali Kelat	def.	(France) Elies Abdelali	TKO (punches)	3	2:29	

== ONE Friday Fights 162 & The Inner Circle 22 ==
ONE Friday Fights 162: Kongklai vs. Benwarwar / The Inner Circle 22
- Promotion: ONE Championship
- Date: July 17, 2026
- Venue: Lumpinee Boxing Stadium
- City: Bangkok, Thailand

ONE Friday Fights 162: Kongklai vs. Benwarwar (also known as ONE Lumpinee 162) / The Inner Circle 22 was a combat sports event produced by ONE Championship that took place on July 17, 2026, at Lumpinee Boxing Stadium in Bangkok, Thailand.

=== Background ===
A bantamweight Muay Thai bout between Kongklai Sor.Sommai and Adam Benwarwar headlined the event.

=== Bonus awards ===
The following fighters received $10,000 bonuses:

- Performance of the Night: Adam Benwarwar

=== Results ===
ONE Friday Fights 162 (YouTube / Facebook)
Weight Class				Method	Round	Time	Notes
Bantamweight Muay Thai	(Morocco) Adam Benwarwar	def.	(Thailand) Kongklai Sor.Sommai	TKO (punches)	2	2:45	
Flyweight Muay Thai	(Thailand) Khunponnoi Sor.Sommai	def.	(Scotland) Gregor Thom	Decision (unanimous)	3	3:00	
Flyweight Muay Thai	(Thailand) Buakaew Sor.Sor.Pakorn	def.	(Mexico) Aldo Cruz	Decision (split)	3	3:00	
Strawweight Muay Thai	(Thailand) Watcharapon Risingmuaythai	def.	(Thailand) Singsuek Sakanupong	Decision (unanimous)	3	3:00	
Lightweight Muay Thai	(Australia) Jaxson Hayman	def.	(China) Liu Quan	Decision (unanimous)	3	3:00	
Flyweight Muay Thai	(Thailand) Petubon Sor.Tienchai	def.	(Thailand) Lerdsila Jitmuangnon	Decision (unanimous)	3	3:00	
Strawweight Kickboxing	(Japan) Ryunosuke Omori	def.	(Iraq) Ali Al-Kinani	Decision (unanimous)	3	3:00	
Women's Atomweight Muay Thai	(United Kingdom) Mia Trevorrow	def.	(Italy) Magdalena Pircher	Decision (unanimous)	3	3:00	

The Inner Circle 22 (Superfans at Live ONE)
Weight Class				Method	Round	Time	Notes
Strawweight Kickboxing	(Italy) Jonathan Di Bella (c)	def.	(China) Zhang Peimian	Decision (unanimous)	5	3:00	For the ONE Strawweight Kickboxing World Championship.
Women's Openweight Submission Grappling	(United States) Helena Crevar	def.	(United States) Paige Ivette Clymer	Decision (unanimous)	1	10:00	
Lightweight Muay Thai	(Iraq) Mustafa Al-Tekreeti	def.	(Thailand) Kompikart P.K.Saenchai	Decision (unanimous)	3	3:00	
Bantamweight Muay Thai	(Thailand) Wuttikrai Wor.Chakrawut	def.	(Myanmar) Sonrak Fairtex	Decision (unanimous)	3	3:00	
Bantamweight Kickboxing	(Japan) Yuki Yoza	def.	(United Kingdom) Ben Woolliss	Decision (unanimous)	3	3:00	

== ONE Fight Night 45 ==
ONE Fight Night 45: Lessei vs. Rabah
- Promotion: ONE Championship
- Date: July 18, 2026
- Venue: Lumpinee Boxing Stadium
- City: Bangkok, Thailand

ONE Fight Night 45: Lessei vs. Rabah was a combat sports event produced by ONE Championship that took place on July 18, 2026, at Lumpinee Boxing Stadium in Bangkok, Thailand.

=== Background ===
A featherweight Muay Thai bout between Luke Lessei and Mohamed Younes Rabah headlined the event.

At the weigh-ins, three fighters failed to hydration test and missed weight for their respective fights:

- Antonio Cesar weighted in at 141.4 pounds, 6.4 pounds over the flyweight limit and he was fined 30 percent of his purse which went to Lito Adiwang.
- Felipe Lobo weighted in at 145.4 pounds, 0.4 pounds over the bantamweight limit and he was fined 30 percent of his purse which went to Dmitrii Kovtun.
- Sean Climaco weighted in at 135.4 pounds, 0.4 pounds over the flyweight limit and he was fined 30 percent of his purse which went to Black Panther VenumMuaythai.

=== Bonus awards ===
The following fighters received $50,000 bonuses:

- Performance of the Night: Suablack Tor.Pran49

=== Results ===
ONE Fight Night 45 (Amazon Prime Video)
Weight Class				Method	Round	Time	Notes
Featherweight Muay Thai	(United States) Luke Lessei	def.	(Algeria) Mohamed Younes Rabah	Decision (unanimous)	3	3:00	
Flyweight Muay Thai	(Thailand) Suablack Tor.Pran49	def.	(Scotland) Stephen Irvine	KO (elbow)	2	1:41	
Flyweight MMA	(Brazil) Antonio Cesar	def.	(Philippines) Lito Adiwang	Decision (unanimous)	3	5:00	Cesar missed weight (141.4 lb).
Women's Atomweight MMA	(Canada) Anastasia Nikolakakos	def.	(Malaysia) Jihin Radzuan	Decision (split)	3	5:00	
Bantamweight Muay Thai	(Russia) Dmitrii Kovtun	def.	(Brazil) Felipe Lobo	Decision (unanimous)	3	3:00	Lobo missed weight (145.4 lb).
Strawweight MMA	(South Korea) Lee Seung-chul	def.	(South Africa) Bokang Masunyane	Decision (unanimous)	3	5:00	
Flyweight Muay Thai	(Thailand) Black Panther VenumMuaythai	def.	(United States) Sean Climaco	Decision (unanimous)	3	3:00	Climaco missed weight (135.4 lb).
Women's Strawweight MMA	(Brazil) Victória Souza	def.	(Japan) Ayaka Miura	Decision (unanimous)	3	5:00	
Flyweight MMA	(Russia) Ruslan Satiev	def.	(Uzbekistan) Sanzhar Zakirov	Decision (unanimous)	3	5:00	

== ONE Friday Fights 163 & The Inner Circle 23 ==
ONE Friday Fights 163: Pompet vs. Nat Khat Min / The Inner Circle 23
- Promotion: ONE Championship
- Date: July 24, 2026
- Venue: Lumpinee Boxing Stadium
- City: Bangkok, Thailand

ONE Friday Fights 163: Pompet vs. Nat Khat Min (also known as ONE Lumpinee 163) / The Inner Circle 23 was a combat sports event produced by ONE Championship that took place on July 24, 2026, at Lumpinee Boxing Stadium in Bangkok, Thailand.

=== Background ===
A flyweight Muay Thai bout between Pompet Panthonggym and Nat Khat Min headlined the event.

=== Bonus awards ===
The following fighters received bonuses:

- Performance of the Night ($50,000): Aliff Sor.Dechapan
- Performance of the Night ($10,000): Pompet Panthonggym, Petsuphan Lookmuangpet, Mahesuan Aekmuangnon and Ryujin Nasukawa

=== Results ===
ONE Friday Fights 163 (YouTube / Facebook)
Weight Class				Method	Round	Time	Notes
Flyweight Muay Thai	(Thailand) Pompet Panthonggym	def.	(Myanmar) Nat Khat Min	TKO (punch and knee)	3	2:35	
Bantamweight Muay Thai	(Thailand) Mongkoldetlek Por.Pim-on	def.	(Kyrgyzstan) Utkirzhon Khamidov	TKO (knees)	2	2:00	
Flyweight Muay Thai	(Thailand) Grippen Rachanon	def.	(Thailand) Brazil Aekmuangnon	Decision (unanimous)	3	3:00	
Flyweight Muay Thai	(Thailand) Petsuphan Lookmuangpet	def.	(Thailand) Petsamart Muangphaphum	TKO (punches)	2	1:53	
Strawweight Muay Thai	(China) Zhao Zhengdong	def.	(Russia) Eduard Markarian	Decision (unanimous)	3	3:00	Both fighters missed weight: Zhao (125.4 lb), Markarian (126.2 lb).
Featherweight MMA	(South Africa) O'Neal Thompson	def.	(Chinese Taipei) Jason Chen	Decision (unanimous)	3	5:00	
Atomweight Muay Thai	(Thailand) Mahesuan Aekmuangnon	def.	(Thailand) YodUdon K.Tongtalingchan	KO (punches)	2	1:07	
Flyweight Muay Thai	(Thailand) Nakee Siriluckmuaythai	def.	(Thailand) Petbancha Hongthongmuaythai	KO (punch)	1	2:58	
Featherweight MMA	(Japan) Myke Ohura	def.	(Philippines) Jay De Villa	Submission (arm-triangle choke)	1	4:22	Ohura missed weight (155.6 lb).

The Inner Circle 23 (Superfans at Live ONE)
Weight Class				Method	Round	Time	Notes
Strawweight Muay Thai	(Malaysia) Aliff Sor.Dechapan	def.	(Thailand) Sam-A Gaiyanghadao	KO (head kick and punch)	5	1:09	For the interim ONE Strawweight Muay Thai World Championship.
Bantamweight Kickboxing	(Thailand) Panpayak Jitmuangnon	def.	(Mexico) Anuar Cisneros	Decision (unanimous)	3	3:00	
Lightweight Muay Thai	(Germany) Michel Dirlenbach	def.	(Iran) Mahan Fotouhi	Decision (unanimous)	3	3:00	
Strawweight Kickboxing	(Japan) Ryujin Nasukawa	def.	(Thailand) Thongpoon P.K.Saenchai	TKO (punches)	2	2:00	
Flyweight Kickboxing	(China) Liu Junchao	def.	(Japan) Kosei Yoshida	Decision (unanimous)	3	3:00	

== ONE Friday Fights 164 & The Inner Circle 24 ==
ONE Friday Fights 164: Watcharapon vs. Hamidi / The Inner Circle 24
- Promotion: ONE Championship
- Date: July 31, 2026
- Venue: Lumpinee Boxing Stadium
- City: Bangkok, Thailand

ONE Friday Fights 164: Watcharapon vs. Hamidi (also known as ONE Lumpinee 164) / The Inner Circle 24 was a combat sports event produced by ONE Championship that took place on July 31, 2026, at Lumpinee Boxing Stadium in Bangkok, Thailand.

=== Background ===
A strawweight Muay Thai bout between Watcharapon Laochokcharoen and Akram Hamidi headlined the event.

=== Bonus awards ===
The following fighters received bonuses:

- Performance of the Night ($50,000): Elbek Alyshov
- Performance of the Night ($10,000): Thongchai Jeabramintra, Islay Erika Bomogao, Olivia Bahsous, Abdallah Ondash and Asahi Shinagawa

=== Results ===
ONE Friday Fights 164 (YouTube / Facebook)
Weight Class				Method	Round	Time	Notes
Strawweight Muay Thai	(Algeria) Akram Hamidi	def.	(Thailand) Watcharapon Laochokcharoen	Decision (unanimous)	3	3:00	
Flyweight Muay Thai	(Thailand) Arsoonnoi Sitjasing	def.	(Thailand) Nongkhailek Dr.Knotmuaythai	Decision (unanimous)	3	3:00	
Strawweight Muay Thai	(Uzbekistan) Adham Ruziev	def.	(Thailand) Pongsiri Sujeebameekiew	Decision (unanimous)	3	3:00	
Strawweight Muay Thai	(Thailand) Thongchai Jeabramintra	def.	(Thailand) Kongmeechai Sor.Bagrajan	KO (punches)	2	2:10	
Women's Atomweight Muay Thai	(Philippines) Islay Erika Bomogao	def.	(Thailand) Klinphaka Por.Thaisong	KO (punch)	3	0:13	
Flyweight Kickboxing	(Belgium) Rahim Tcherchaiko	def.	(Cape Verde) Diogo Miguel Silva	Decision (unanimous)	3	3:00	Miguel Silva was issued a yellow card in round 3 for illegal clinching.
Women's 102 lbs. Muay Thai	(Canada) Olivia Bahsous	def.	(Thailand) Nonglek Krudamgym	TKO (head kick and punches)	2	0:48	
Featherweight MMA	(Spain) Kevin Perdomo	def.	(Nigeria) Philemon Bitrus Jeb	Decision (split)	3	5:00	Perdomo missed weight (155.8 lb).
Atomweight Muay Thai	(Japan) Shinichi Watanabe	def.	(Laos) Nongbia Laolanexang	TKO (3 knockdowns)	1	2:03	

The Inner Circle 24 (Superfans at Live ONE)
Weight Class				Method	Round	Time	Notes
Bantamweight MMA	(Azerbaijan) Elbek Alyshov	def.	(Mongolia) Enkh-Orgil Baatarkhuu (c)	KO (punches)	2	2:52	For the ONE Bantamweight World Championship.
Flyweight Muay Thai	(Lebanon) Ramadan Ondash	def.	(Malaysia) Johan Ghazali	Decision (split)	3	3:00	Ondash was issued a yellow card in round 3 due to his mouthpiece falling out repeatedly.
Strawweight Muay Thai	(Lebanon) Abdallah Ondash	def.	(Thailand) Chokpreecha P.K.TomTK.Alaiyont	KO (body kick)	1	0:19	
Strawweight Muay Thai	(Japan) Asahi Shinagawa	def.	(Mexico) Salvador Velasquez Villarello	TKO (3 knockdowns)	1	2:27	

== ONE Friday Fights 165 & The Inner Circle 25 ==
ONE Friday Fights 165: Petninmungkorn vs. Pet / The Inner Circle 25
- Promotion: ONE Championship
- Date: August 7, 2026
- Venue: Lumpinee Boxing Stadium
- City: Bangkok, Thailand

ONE Friday Fights 165: Petninmungkorn vs. Pet (also known as ONE Lumpinee 165) / The Inner Circle 25 was a combat sports event produced by ONE Championship that took place on August 7, 2026, at Lumpinee Boxing Stadium in Bangkok, Thailand.

=== Background ===
An Atomweight Muay Thai bout between Petninmungkorn NamkaengIceland and Pet Suanluangrodyok headlined the event.

=== Bonus awards ===
The following fighters received bonuses:

- Performance of the Night ($50,000): Suakim Sor.Jor.Tongprajin
- Performance of the Night ($10,000): Ilyas Musaev, Tantawy Ahmed Hafez and Tsubasa Kaneko

=== Results ===
ONE Friday Fights 165 (YouTube / Facebook)
Weight Class				Method	Round	Time	Notes
Atomweight Muay Thai	(Thailand) Petninmungkorn NamkaengIceland	def.	(Thailand) Pet Suanluangrodyok	Decision (split)	3	3:00	
Bantamweight Muay Thai	(Russia) Ilyas Musaev	def.	(Thailand) Suksawat P.K.Saenchai	KO (punch to the body)	1	2:11	
Atomweight Muay Thai	(Thailand) Kom P.K.Saenchai	def.	(Thailand) Monpraram Sitpetchalugan	Decision (unanimous)	3	3:00	
Strawweight Muay Thai	(Egypt) Tantawy Ahmed Hafez	def.	(Thailand) Rawee N.F.Looksuan	KO (spinning back kick)	2	0:39	
Bantamweight Muay Thai	(Thailand) Petanda Kiatyodying	def.	(Thailand) Changthong M.U.Den	KO (body kicks and punch)	1	2:45	
Strawweight Muay Thai	(Thailand) Superchamp Wutdychonburipraleasing	def.	(Thailand) Attachai N.F.Looksuan	TKO (punches)	1	2:32	
Atomweight Muay Thai	(Thailand) Pettri Sitjaedang	def.	(Myanmar) Aung Tun Bo	Decision (unanimous)	3	3:00	
Flyweight Muay Thai	(Laos) Songpandin Chor.Kaewwiset	def.	(Italy) Vincenzo Esposito	TKO (elbow and knee)	2	2:22	
Strawweight Kickboxing	(Japan) Tsubasa Kaneko	def.	(China) Peng Zihao	KO (head kick)	1	2:56	

The Inner Circle 25 (Superfans at Live ONE)
Weight Class				Method	Round	Time	Notes
Bantamweight Muay Thai	(Thailand) Suakim Sor.Jor.Tongprajin	def.	(Algeria) Nabil Anane	Decision (split)	3	3:00	
Bantamweight Muay Thai	(Russia) Abdulla Dayakaev	def.	(Thailand) Superlek Kiatmuu9	TKO (knee injury)	2	0:39	
Featherweight Kickboxing	(Armenia) Marat Grigorian	def.	(Russia) Mamuka Usubyan	Decision (unanimous)	3	3:00	For the ONE Samurai Featherweight Kickboxing Tournament Quarter-finals.
Strawweight Muay Thai	(Thailand) Dabdam Por.Tor.Thor.Thongtawee	def.	(Thailand) Tahaneak Nayokatasala	TKO (punches)	3	0:38	
Atomweight Muay Thai	(Thailand) Chatpet Suablackmuaythai	def.	(Japan) Riku Ito	Decision (unanimous)	3	3:00	

== ONE Samurai 2 ==
ONE Samurai 2
- Promotion: ONE Championship
- Date: August 8, 2026
- Venue: Ebara Wave Arena Ota
- City: Tokyo, Japan

ONE Samurai 2 was a combat sports event produced by ONE Championship that took place on August 8, 2026, at Ebara Wave Arena Ota in Tokyo, Japan.

=== Bonus awards ===
The following fighters received bonuses:

- Performance of the Night ($95,000): Masaaki Noiri
- Performance of the Night ($45,000): Mohammad Siasarani, Keito Yamakita and Katsuki Kitano
- Performance of the Night ($9,500): Subaru Mori

=== Results ===
ONE Samurai 2 (PPV at Live ONE)
Weight Class				Method	Round	Time	Notes
Featherweight Kickboxing	(Japan) Masaaki Noiri	def.	(China) Liu Mengyang	KO (punch)	1	2:59	For the ONE Samurai Featherweight Kickboxing Tournament Quarter-finals.
Featherweight Kickboxing	(Iran) Mohammad Siasarani	def.	(Japan) Kaito Ono	KO (head kick)	1	1:27	For the ONE Samurai Featherweight Kickboxing Tournament Quarter-finals.
Featherweight Kickboxing	(China) Luo Chao	def.	(Japan) Kosuke Takagi	Decision (unanimous)	3	3:00	For the ONE Samurai Featherweight Kickboxing Tournament Quarter-finals.
Strawweight MMA	(Japan) Keito Yamakita	def.	(Japan) Koyuru Tanoue	Submission (bulldog choke)	1	4:37	
Featherweight Kickboxing	(Japan) Hiroki Kasahara	def.	(Japan) Ryuto Shiokawa	Decision (split)	3	3:00	
Strawweight Kickboxing	(Japan) Reiji Takaki	def.	(Japan) Shoma Okumura	Decision (unanimous)	3	3:00	
Bantamweight Kickboxing	(Japan) Katsuki Kitano	def.	(Japan) Ranma	KO (knees to the body)	3	0:53	
Lightweight MMA	(Japan) Subaru Mori	def.	(Japan) Yusuke Sato	Submission (rear-naked choke)	2	2:43	

== ONE Friday Fights 166 & The Inner Circle 26 ==
ONE Friday Fights 166: Khunpon vs. Panpadej / The Inner Circle 26
- Promotion: ONE Championship
- Date: August 14, 2026
- Venue: Lumpinee Boxing Stadium
- City: Bangkok, Thailand

ONE Friday Fights 166: Khunpon vs. Panpadej (also known as ONE Lumpinee 166) / The Inner Circle 26 was a combat sports event produced by ONE Championship that took place on August 14, 2026, at Lumpinee Boxing Stadium in Bangkok, Thailand.

=== Background ===
A flyweight Muay Thai bout between Khunpon Aekmuangnon and Panpadej N.F.Looksuan headlined the event.

=== Bonus awards ===
The following fighters received $10,000 bonuses:

- Performance of the Night: Pet Sitchalongsak, Babak Haghi and Gingsanglek Tor.Laksong

=== Results ===
ONE Friday Fights 166 (YouTube / Facebook)
Weight Class				Method	Round	Time	Notes
Flyweight Muay Thai	(Thailand) Panpadej N.F.Looksuan	def.	(Thailand) Khunpon Aekmuangnon	Decision (unanimous)	3	3:00	Only 129 lbs limit, Panpadej missed weight (132.6 lb).
Flyweight Muay Thai	(Thailand) Denkriangkrai MavinnMuaythai	def.	(Morocco) Abdessamie Rhenimi	Decision (unanimous)	3	3:00	
Featherweight Muay Thai	(Thailand) Pet Sitchalongsak	def.	(Thailand) Sompongchai Sit.Dr.Charnchai	KO (punches)	1	1:46	Only 147 lbs limit, Sompongchai missed weight (150.6 lb).
Atomweight Muay Thai	(Laos) Saipetlek Coachnatsamartmuaythai	def.	(Thailand) Aidangkoeychai Sitkaewprapon	Decision (split)	3	3:00	Only 112 lbs limit, Saipetlek missed weight (112.6 lb).
Bantamweight Kickboxing	(Venezuela) Gabriel Pereira	def.	(France) Arthur Klopp	Decision (unanimous)	3	3:00	Pereira missed weight (147.2 lb).
Flyweight Muay Thai	(Iran) Babak Haghi	def.	(Thailand) Chamanow Santiubon	KO (punch)	1	1:42	
Bantamweight MMA	(Azerbaijan) Mirmehti Miriyev	def.	(Mongolia) Batochir Batsaikhan	Decision (unanimous)	3	5:00	
Women's Atomweight Muay Thai	(Thailand) Nongfahsai TOP P.K.Saenchai	def.	(Turkey) Zeynep Cetintas	Decision (unanimous)	3	3:00	
Bantamweight MMA	(Japan) Kenya Yamada	def.	(Chinese Taipei) Lee Chi Lu	Submission (rear-naked choke)	2	4:22	

The Inner Circle 26 (Superfans at Live ONE)
Weight Class				Method	Round	Time	Notes
Strawweight Muay Thai	(Laos) Petnamkhong Sor.Maneekhot	def.	(Thailand) Wanchainoi Sor.Tor.Hiewbangsaen	Decision (unanimous)	3	3:00	
Flyweight Muay Thai	(Thailand) Gingsanglek Tor.Laksong	def.	(United States) Dmitrii Ramos	KO (punches and knee)	2	1:13	
Lightweight Muay Thai	(Thailand) Petkhaokradong Lukjaomaesaithong	def.	(Belarus) Vadzim Shapiatsiuk	Decision (unanimous)	3	3:00	
Atomweight Muay Thai	(Thailand) Bakjo Sitkhunma	def.	(Thailand) Phetsuphan Por.Daorungruang	Decision (unanimous)	3	3:00	
Women's Atomweight Muay Thai	(Thailand) Nongnuk Sor.Dechapan	def.	(Japan) Saya Ito	Decision (unanimous)	3	3:00	

== ONE Fight Night 46 ==
ONE Fight Night 46: Hemetsberger vs. Diachkova
- Promotion: ONE Championship
- Date: August 15, 2026
- Venue: Lumpinee Boxing Stadium
- City: Bangkok, Thailand

ONE Fight Night 46: Hemetsberger vs. Diachkova was a combat sports event produced by ONE Championship that took place on August 15, 2026, at Lumpinee Boxing Stadium in Bangkok, Thailand.

=== Background ===
A ONE Women's Strawweight Muay Thai World Championship bout between current champion (also current ONE Women's Strawweight Kickboxing World Champion) Stella Hemetsberger and Natalia Diachkova headlined the event.

=== Bonus awards ===
The following fighters received $50,000 bonuses:

- Performance of the Night: Stella Hemetsberger

=== Results ===
ONE Fight Night 46 (Amazon Prime Video)
Weight Class				Method	Round	Time	Notes
Women's Strawweight Muay Thai	(Austria) Stella Hemetsberger (c)	def.	(Russia) Natalia Diachkova	KO (body kick and punches)	3	1:46	For the ONE Women's Strawweight Muay Thai World Championship.
Featherweight Kickboxing	(Scotland) Nico Carrillo	def.	(China) Zhou Jiaqiang	KO (punch)	2	2:37	
Bantamweight MMA	(Brazil) Marcos Aurélio	def.	(Philippines) Jhanlo Mark Sangiao	KO (punches)	1	0:57	
Women's Atomweight Kickboxing	(Japan) Kana Morimoto	def.	(Hong Kong) Yu Yau Pui	Decision (unanimous)	3	3:00	
Flyweight MMA	(Vietnam) Viet Anh Do	def.	(Brazil) Davi Brandão	TKO (knee and punches)	3	1:25	Anh Do missed weight (137.2 lb).
Featherweight Submission Grappling	(Brazil) Ruan Alvarenga	def.	(Brazil) Meyram Maquine Alves	Decision (unanimous)	1	10:00	
Women's Atomweight MMA	(Poland) Magdalena Czaban	def.	(United States) Natalie Salcedo	Decision (unanimous)	3	5:00	
Bantamweight Kickboxing	(Brazil) Denis Souza Jr.	def.	(Russia) Dmitrii Kovtun	Decision (unanimous)	3	3:00	

== ONE Friday Fights 167 & The Inner Circle 27 ==
ONE Friday Fights 167: Dedduanglek vs. Kongsuk 2 / The Inner Circle 27
- Promotion: ONE Championship
- Date: August 21, 2026
- Venue: Lumpinee Boxing Stadium
- City: Bangkok, Thailand

ONE Friday Fights 167: Dedduanglek vs. Kongsuk 2 (also known as ONE Lumpinee 167) / The Inner Circle 27 was a combat sports event produced by ONE Championship that took place on August 21, 2026, at Lumpinee Boxing Stadium in Bangkok, Thailand.

=== Background ===
A flyweight Muay Thai rematch between Dedduanglek Torfunfarm and Kongsuk Fairtex headlined the event. The pairing previously met at ONE Friday Fights 35 in September 2023, which Dedduanglek won by unanimous decision.

=== Bonus awards ===
The following fighters received $10,000 bonuses:

- Performance of the Night: Kajornklai Sor.Sor.Toipadriew and Raize

=== Results ===
ONE Friday Fights 167 (YouTube / Facebook)
Weight Class				Method	Round	Time	Notes
Flyweight Muay Thai	(Thailand) Kongsuk Fairtex	def.	(Thailand) Dedduanglek Torfunfarm	Decision (split)	3	3:00	
Strawweight Muay Thai	(Thailand) Yokkiri TN.Muaythai	def.	(Iraq) Ali Al-Kinani	Decision (split)	3	3:00	
Bantamweight Muay Thai	(Thailand) Kajornklai Sor.Sor.Toipadriew	def.	(Thailand) Tewadalek Tor.Muangthoenmuaythai	KO (punch)	2	0:11	
Featherweight Muay Thai	(Thailand) Petgarfield Jitmuangnon	def.	(Thailand) Netpayak Changaewburiram	TKO (arm injury)	2	0:17	
Bantamweight MMA	(Republic of Ireland) Nauris Bartoska	def.	(Australia) Patrick Hill	TKO (body kick)	2	1:12	
Women's Atomweight Muay Thai	(Italy) Giorgia Pieropan	def.	(Thailand) Ploychan Sitnayokdam	Decision (unanimous)	3	3:00	
Strawweight Kickboxing	(Japan) Raize	def.	(Azerbaijan) Vusal Aliyev	KO (knees to the body and punches)	1	2:16	Only 122 lbs limit, Aliyev missed weight (123.6 lb).
Flyweight Muay Thai	(China) Sheng Yiyang	def.	(Japan) Shota Takezoe	TKO (3 knockdowns)	2	1:05	

The Inner Circle 27 (Superfans at Live ONE)
Weight Class				Method	Round	Time	Notes
Atomweight Muay Thai	(Thailand) Banluelok Sitwatcharachai	def.	(Thailand) Songchainoi Kiatsongrit	Decision (unanimous)	3	3:00	
Bantamweight Muay Thai	(Thailand) Komawut FA.Group	def.	(Myanmar) Kyaw Swar Win	Decision (split)	3	3:00	
Bantamweight Muay Thai	(Thailand) Yodphupa Petkiatpet	def.	(Myanmar) Saw Min Min	Decision (unanimous)	3	3:00	
Lightweight Muay Thai	(Sweden) Dalian Dawody	def.	(Libya) Lamin Al Souayah	TKO (3 knockdowns)	1	2:00	
Flyweight Kickboxing	(United Kingdom) Ben Longstaff	def.	(Japan) Kazuteru Yamazaki	TKO (3 knockdowns)	1	1:44	

== ONE Friday Fights 168 & The Inner Circle 28 ==
ONE Friday Fights 168: Wuttikrai vs. Habibpour / The Inner Circle 28
- Promotion: ONE Championship
- Date: August 28, 2026
- Venue: Lumpinee Boxing Stadium
- City: Bangkok, Thailand

ONE Friday Fights 168: Wuttikrai vs. Habibpour (also known as ONE Lumpinee 168) / The Inner Circle 28 was a combat sports event produced by ONE Championship that took place on August 28, 2026, at Lumpinee Boxing Stadium in Bangkok, Thailand.

=== Background ===
A bantamweight Muay Thai bout between Wuttikrai Wor.Chakrawut and Mohammad Habibpour headlined the event.

=== Bonus awards ===
The following fighters received $10,000 bonuses:

- Performance of the Night: Denis Dotsenko, Korpai Sor.Yingcharoenkarnchang, Burklerk Lookmuangpet and Ryoto Nishiyama

=== Results ===
ONE Friday Fights 168 (YouTube / Facebook)
Weight Class				Method	Round	Time	Notes
Bantamweight Muay Thai	(Thailand) Wuttikrai Wor.Chakrawut	def.	(Iran) Mohammad Habibpour	Decision (unanimous)	3	3:00	
Flyweight Muay Thai	(Thailand) Brazil Aekmuangnon	def.	(Thailand) Petphupa Aekpujean	Decision (unanimous)	3	3:00	
Bantamweight Muay Thai	(Ukraine) Denis Dotsenko	def.	(Thailand) Nuengkaonueng Laochokcharoen	TKO (punches)	2	2:01	
Bantamweight Muay Thai	(Thailand) Korpai Sor.Yingcharoenkarnchang	def.	(Thailand) Petburapha Petchompoo	KO (punch)	1	2:32	
Bantamweight Muay Thai	(Thailand) Chalamkhao Sitkhunma	def.	(Pakistan) Mohammed Faizan	KO (punch)	2	0:21	Only 138 lbs limit, Chalamkhao missed weight (138.4 lb).
Atomweight Muay Thai	(Thailand) Burklerk Lookmuangpet	def.	(Thailand) Nuapayak Putprachachuen	KO (punch)	1	1:24	
Bantamweight Kickboxing	(Japan) Yuri Tanaka	def.	(China) Zhao Chongyang	Decision (unanimous)	3	3:00	
Women's Atomweight Muay Thai	(Thailand) Fahlab Nakhonsawan Sports School	def.	(Italy) Valentina Cancello	Decision (unanimous)	3	3:00	
Flyweight MMA	(Japan) Ryoto Nishiyama	def.	(South Korea) Geun Ho-son	KO (punches)	1	4:36	

The Inner Circle 28 (Superfans at Live ONE)
Weight Class				Method	Round	Time	Notes
Bantamweight Muay Thai	(Italy) Lenny Blasi	def.	(Thailand) Worapon Lukjaoporongtom	Decision (unanimous)	3	3:00	
Flyweight Muay Thai	(Thailand) Chartpayak Saksatoon	def.	(Thailand) Rambong Sor.Therapat	Decision (unanimous)	3	3:00	
Flyweight Muay Thai	(Pakistan) Ubaid Hussain	def.	(Thailand) Isannuea Chotbangsaen	Decision (unanimous)	3	3:00	
Flyweight Muay Thai	(Uzbekistan) Fakhriddin Khasanov	def.	(Algeria) Basta Abdelmouneme	Decision (unanimous)	3	3:00	Only 128 lbs limit, Khasanov missed weight (128.6 lb).
Strawweight Kickboxing	(Japan) Keisuke Monguchi	def.	(South Korea) Jung Hyun-woo	Decision (split)	3	3:00	

== ONE Friday Fights 169 & The Inner Circle 29 ==
ONE Friday Fights 169: Khunponnoi vs. Sunvo / The Inner Circle 29
- Promotion: ONE Championship
- Date: September 4, 2026
- Venue: Lumpinee Boxing Stadium
- City: Bangkok, Thailand

ONE Friday Fights 169: Khunponnoi vs. Sunvo (also known as ONE Lumpinee 169) / The Inner Circle 29 was a combat sports event produced by ONE Championship that took place on September 4, 2026, at Lumpinee Boxing Stadium in Bangkok, Thailand.

=== Background ===
A flyweight Muay Thai bout between Petmuangsri Torfunfarm and Gregor Thom was scheduled to headline the event.but the bout was moved to The Inner Circle 29, after Guluzada missed weight and was scrapped. Therefore, a Muay Thai bout between Khunponnoi Sor.Sommai and Sunvo Torfunfarm headlined to event.

=== Bonus awards ===
The following fighters received $10,000 bonuses:

- Performance of the Night: Arman Moradi

=== Results ===
ONE Friday Fights 169 (YouTube / Facebook)
Weight Class				Method	Round	Time	Notes
Flyweight Muay Thai	(Thailand) Sunvo Torfunfarm	def.	(Thailand) Khunponnoi Sor.Sommai	Decision (split)	3	3:00	
Featherweight Muay Thai	(Iran) Arman Moradi	def.	(Thailand) Dansiam Weerasakreck	KO (knee to the body)	2	2:36	
Strawweight Muay Thai	(Thailand) Sunday Sor.Sombatfarm	def.	(Laos) Kongpoxay P.K.Saenchai	Decision (unanimous)	3	3:00	
Flyweight Kickboxing	(Thailand) Pinsiam Sitbonsakon	def.	(Thailand) Yodphupa VenumMuaythai	Decision (unanimous)	3	3:00	
Strawweight MMA	(Kyrgyzstan) Sanzhar Mansurov	def.	(Turkey) Ruslan Bulut	Decision (unanimous)	3	5:00	
Flyweight Muay Thai	(Thailand) Siwanat MavinnMuaythai	def.	(France) Yanis Ben Alaya	Decision (unanimous)	3	3:00	
Featherweight Kickboxing	(Japan) Ryoya Inai	def.	(Ghana) Daniel Vortiah	Decision (split)	3	3:00	

The Inner Circle 29 (Superfans at Live ONE)
Weight Class				Method	Round	Time	Notes
Flyweight Muay Thai	(Thailand) Petmuangsri Torfunfarm	def.	(Scotland) Gregor Thom	Decision (unanimous)	3	3:00	
Bantamweight Muay Thai	(Thailand) Mongkoldetlek Por.Pim-on	def.	(Morocco) Yassir Rassafi	Decision (majority)	3	3:00	
Atomweight Muay Thai	(Thailand) Rak Erawan	def.	(Thailand) Hern NF.Looksuan	TKO (3 knockdowns)	1	2:48	
Flyweight Muay Thai	(Laos) Songpandin Chor.Kaewwiset	def.	(Thailand) Petsiam Soonsrangthangtak	TKO (punches)	2	2:50	
Flyweight Kickboxing	(Japan) Kyo Kawakami	def.	(Australia) Isaiah Badato	Decision (unanimous)	3	3:00	

== ONE Fight Night 47 ==
ONE Fight Night 47: Stamp vs. Flores
- Promotion: ONE Championship
- Date: September 5, 2026
- Venue: Lumpinee Boxing Stadium
- City: Bangkok, Thailand

ONE Fight Night 47: Stamp vs. Flores was a combat sports event produced by ONE Championship that took place on September 5, 2026, at Lumpinee Boxing Stadium in Bangkok, Thailand.

=== Background ===
A women's atomweight Muay Thai bout between former ONE Women's Atomweight Three-Sports World Champion Stamp Fairtex and Selina Flores headlined the event.

At the weigh-ins, three fighters failed to hydration test and missed weight for their respective fights:

- Ricardo Bravo weighted in at 159.4 pounds, 4.4 pounds over the featherweight limit and he was fined 30 percent of his purse which went to Mohamed Younes Rabah.
- Gabriela Fujimoto weighted in at 123.2 pounds, 8.2 pounds over the atomweight limit.
- Macarena Aragon weighted in at 120.4 pounds, 5.4 pounds over the atomweight limit.

=== Bonus awards ===
The following fighters received $50,000 bonuses:

- Performance of the Night: Paweł Jaworski

=== Results ===
ONE Fight Night 47 (Amazon Prime Video)
Weight Class				Method	Round	Time	Notes
Women's Atomweight Muay Thai	(Thailand) Stamp Fairtex	def.	(United States) Selina Flores	Decision (split)	3	3:00	
Featherweight Muay Thai	(Argentina) Ricardo Bravo	def.	(Algeria) Mohamed Younes Rabah	KO (punches)	1	2:59	Bravo missed weight (159.4 lb).
Strawweight MMA	(Brazil) Fabio Henrique	def.	(Japan) Ryohei Kurosawa	Decision (unanimous)	3	5:00	
Flyweight Muay Thai	(Colombia) Jhordan Estupiñan	def.	(Thailand) Jaosuayai Mor. Krungthepthonburi	Decision (unanimous)	3	3:00	
Middleweight Submission Grappling	(Poland) Paweł Jaworski	def.	(United States) Rafael Lovato Jr.	Submission (kneebar)	1	1:51	
Featherweight MMA	(Brazil) João Pedro Dantas	def.	(Argentina) Hector Almonacid	Decision (unanimous)	3	5:00	
Women's Atomweight MMA	(Argentina) Macarena Aragon	def.	(Brazil) Gabriela Fujimoto	Submission (scarf hold americana)	3	2:06	Both fighters missed weight: Fujimoto (123.2 lb), Aragon (120.4 lb).
Strawweight Muay Thai	(Morocco) Elmehdi El Jamari	def.	(Vietnam) Ngoc Phu Nguyen	TKO (3 knockdowns)	1	2:43	

== ONE Friday Fights 170 & The Inner Circle 30 ==
ONE Friday Fights 170: Yodlekpet vs. Pompet 3 / The Inner Circle 30
- Promotion: ONE Championship
- Date: September 11, 2026
- Venue: Lumpinee Boxing Stadium
- City: Bangkok, Thailand

ONE Friday Fights 170: Yodlekpet vs. Pompet 3 (also known as ONE Lumpinee 170) / The Inner Circle 30 was a combat sports event produced by ONE Championship that took place on September 11, 2026, at Lumpinee Boxing Stadium in Bangkok, Thailand.

=== Background ===
A flyweight Muay Thai trilogy between Yodlekpet Or.Atchariya and Pompet Panthonggym headlined the event. The pairing previously met at ONE Friday Fights 120 in August 2025, which Yodlekpet won by split decision. The second time they met at ONE Friday Fights 126 in September 2025, which Pompet won by split decision.

=== Bonus awards ===
The following fighters received $10,000 bonuses:

- Performance of the Night: Muangthai P.K.Saenchai

=== Results ===
ONE Friday Fights 170 (YouTube / Facebook)
Weight Class				Method	Round	Time	Notes
Flyweight Muay Thai	(Thailand) Pompet Panthonggym	def.	(Thailand) Yodlekpet Or.Atchariya	Decision (unanimous)	3	3:00	
Flyweight Muay Thai	(Myanmar) Thway Lin Htet	def.	(Spain) Xavier Gonzalez	Decision (split)	3	3:00	
Strawweight Muay Thai	(Thailand) Petsangwan Sor.Samarngarment	def.	(Thailand) Dabdam PorTorThor.Thongtawee	Decision (unanimous)	3	3:00	
Strawweight Muay Thai	(France) Yonis Anane	def.	(Mexico) Ricardo Sanchez	Decision (split)	3	3:00	
Flyweight Muay Thai	(Egypt) Tantawy Ahmed Hafez	def.	(Thailand) Ganchai Jitmuangnon	Decision (unanimous)	3	3:00	
Strawweight Muay Thai	(Japan) Jurai Ishii	def.	(Thailand) Maisangngern Sor.Yingcharoenkarnchang	Decision (split)	3	3:00	
Atomweight Muay Thai	(Thailand) Pek PorTorThor.Thongtawee	def.	(Japan) Shinichi Watanabe	Decision (unanimous)	3	3:00	

The Inner Circle 30 (Superfans at Live ONE)
Weight Class				Method	Round	Time	Notes
Bantamweight Muay Thai	(Thailand) Yod-IQ Or.Pimolsri	def.	(Thailand) Rambolek Chor.Ajalaboon	Decision (unanimous)	5	3:00	For the vacant ONE Bantamweight Muay Thai World Championship.Rambolek missed weight (145.6 lb) and was stripped the title and Yod-IQ only eligible win the title.
Bantamweight Muay Thai	(Thailand) Muangthai P.K.Saenchai	def.	(Thailand) Saeksan Or. Kwanmuang	TKO (elbow)	3	0:59	
Bantamweight Muay Thai	(Thailand) Ferrari Fairtex	def.	(Brazil) Julio Lobo	Decision (split)	3	3:00	
Bantamweight Muay Thai	(Scotland) Logan Chan	def.	(Thailand) Sangarthit Looksaikongdin	Decision (unanimous)	3	3:00	
Strawweight Muay Thai	(United Kingdom) Freddie Haggerty	def.	(Thailand) Rungruanglek TN.MuayThai	Decision (unanimous)	3	3:00	

== ONE Samurai 3 ==
ONE Samurai 3
- Promotion: ONE Championship
- Date: September 12, 2026
- Venue: Yokohama Buntai
- City: Yokohama, Japan

ONE Samurai 3 was a combat sports event produced by ONE Championship that took place on September 12, 2026, at Yokohama Buntai in Yokohama, Japan.

=== Background ===
An atomweight Kickboxing bout between current ONE Atomweight Muay Thai World Champion Nadaka Yoshinari and Har Ling Om headlined the event.

=== Bonus awards ===
The following fighters received bonuses:

- Performance of the Night ($45,000): Yuya Wakamatsu
- Performance of the Night ($30,000): Shimon Yoshinari and Ryuya Okuwaki
- Performance of the Night ($9,500): Seiichiro Ito, Homura Abe and Yuki Tanaka

=== Results ===
ONE Samurai 3 (PPV at Live ONE)
Weight Class				Method	Round	Time	Notes
Atomweight Kickboxing	(Japan) Nadaka Yoshinari	def.	(Myanmar) Har Ling Om	Decision (unanimous)	3	3:00	Har Ling Om missed weight (118.2 lb).
Flyweight MMA	(Japan) Yuya Wakamatsu	def.	(South Africa) Willie van Rooyen	TKO (doctor stoppage)	2	4:34	
Flyweight Muay Thai	(Japan) Shimon Yoshinari	def.	(Thailand) Suablack Tor.Pran49	KO (punch to the body)	2	1:28	Suablack missed weight (139.2 lb).
Flyweight Kickboxing	(Japan) Hyu Iwata	def.	(Japan) Hyuma Hitachi	Decision (unanimous)	3	3:00	
Strawweight MMA	(Japan) Hiroba Minowa	def.	(Japan) Yuta Miyazawa	Decision (unanimous)	3	5:00	
Atomweight Muay Thai	(Japan) Ryuya Okuwaki	def.	(Thailand) Chokdee Maxjandee	KO (punch to the body)	2	1.29	Chokdee missed weight (118.6 lb).
Flyweight Kickboxing	(Japan) Kosei Yoshida	def.	(China) Zhao Zhengdong	Decision (unanimous)	3	3:00	Only 128 lbs limit, Yoshida missed weight (135 lb).
Strawweight MMA	(Japan) Seiichiro Ito	def.	(Japan) Kazusa Kurobe	Submission (rear-naked choke)	2	2:14	
Strawweight Muay Thai	(Japan) Homura Abe	def.	(Thailand) Tuakiao Kiatkampon	KO (punch)	1	2:02	
Featherweight Kickboxing	(Japan) Yuki Tanaka	def.	(Japan) Aiji Kobayashi	KO (punch)	1	1:07	Kobayashi missed weight (160.6 lb).

== ONE Friday Fights 171 & The Inner Circle 31 ==
ONE Friday Fights 171: Klarob vs. Sornsueknoi / The Inner Circle 31
- Promotion: ONE Championship
- Date: September 18, 2026
- Venue: Lumpinee Boxing Stadium
- City: Bangkok, Thailand

ONE Friday Fights 171: Klarob vs. Sornsueknoi (also known as ONE Lumpinee 171) / The Inner Circle 31 was a combat sports event produced by ONE Championship that took place on September 18, 2026, at Lumpinee Boxing Stadium in Bangkok, Thailand.

=== Background ===
A flyweight Muay Thai bout between Klarob Nuikafeboran and Sornsueknoi FA.Group headlined the event.

=== Bonus awards ===
The following fighters received $10,000 bonuses:

- Performance of the Night: Alex Usieto

=== Results ===
ONE Friday Fights 171 (YouTube / Facebook)
Weight Class				Method	Round	Time	Notes
Flyweight Muay Thai	(Thailand) Klarob Nuikafeboran	def.	(Thailand) Sornsueknoi FA.Group	Decision (unanimous)	3	3:00	
Strawweight Muay Thai	(Myanmar) Mahar Thway	def.	(Thailand) Petsuphan Lookmuangpet	Decision (split)	3	3:00	
Strawweight Muay Thai	(Thailand) Petmontri Petsupanun	def.	(Thailand) Anusorn Jitmuangnon	Decision (majority)	3	3:00	
Women's Strawweight Kickboxing	(Greece) Antonia Prifti	def.	(Belgium) Ameline Gerson	Decision (unanimous)	3	3:00	
Strawweight Muay Thai	(Spain) Alex Usieto	def.	(Myanmar) Hlaing Thet Aung	KO (spinning back kick)	2	1:57	
Lightweight MMA	(United Kingdom) Connor Tymon	def.	(Sweden) Alex Bigander	TKO (punches)	2	2:29	
Flyweight Kickboxing	(Japan) Ryusuke Onodera	def.	(Russia) Khaidarbeg Gazuev	Decision (unanimous)	3	3:00	
Flyweight Kickboxing	(France) Edilson Rodrigues	def.	(Japan) Retsu Sashida	Decision (unanimous)	3	3:00	

The Inner Circle 31 (Superfans at Live ONE)
Weight Class				Method	Round	Time	Notes
Bantamweight Muay Thai	(Russia) Kiamran Nabati	def.	(Thailand) Nonthachai Jitmuangnon	Decision (unanimous)	3	3:00	
Bantamweight Kickboxing	(Thailand) Yamin P.K.Saenchai	def.	(Russia) Alexey Balyko	Decision (unanimous)	3	3:00	
Strawweight Kickboxing	(Thailand) Petchsiam Jor.Pattreya	def.	(China) Wang Zhongxian	Decision (unanimous)	3	3:00	
Women's Atomweight Muay Thai	(Mexico) Cynthia Flores	def.	(Brazil) Gabriele Moram	Decision (unanimous)	3	3:00	
Bantamweight Kickboxing	(Japan) Gump	def.	(France) Velihan Palit	Decision (split)	3	3:00	

== ONE Friday Fights 172 & The Inner Circle 32 ==
ONE Friday Fights 172: Supalek vs. Rhouni / The Inner Circle 32
- Promotion: ONE Championship
- Date: September 25, 2026
- Venue: Lumpinee Boxing Stadium
- City: Bangkok, Thailand

ONE Friday Fights 172: Supalek vs. Rhouni (also known as ONE Lumpinee 172) / The Inner Circle 32 was a combat sports event produced by ONE Championship that took place on September 25, 2026, at Lumpinee Boxing Stadium in Bangkok, Thailand.

=== Background ===
A bantamweight Muay Thai bout between Supalek Jitmuangnon and Othman Rhouni headlined the event.

=== Bonus awards ===
The following fighters received $10,000 bonuses:

- Performance of the Night: Teeyai Torfunfarm (x2), Nuapayak Jitmuangnon (x2), Ma Zhenzhao and Konstantin Shakhtarin

=== Results ===
ONE Friday Fights 172 (YouTube / Facebook)
Weight Class				Method	Round	Time	Notes
Bantamweight Muay Thai	(Thailand) Supalek Jitmuangnon	def.	(Morocco) Othman Rhouni	Decision (unanimous)	3	3:00	
Flyweight Kickboxing	(Thailand) Yodkatanyu Jitmuangnon	def.	(China) Liu Junchao	Decision (split)	3	3:00	
Strawweight Muay Thai	(Thailand) Teeyai Torfunfarm	def.	(Thailand) Mungkorn Sor.Sombatfarm	KO (punch to the body)	1	2:30	
Flyweight Muay Thai	(Thailand) Nuapayak Jitmuangnon	def.	(Thailand) Suajan Sor.Isarachot	KO (elbow)	1	2:07	
Lightweight MMA	(Turkmenistan) Basir Saraliev	def.	(Australia) Sarmad Jahanara	Decision (unanimous)	3	5:00	
Strawweight Muay Thai	(China) Ma Zhenzhao	def.	(Thailand) Samransing Sitchalongsak	KO (punch to the body)	1	2:50	
Featherweight MMA	(Russia) Khurshed Gafurov	def.	(Finland) Leevi Heino	Decision (unanimous)	3	5:00	
Featherweight Kickboxing	(Japan) Yuya Shibata	def.	(France) Bevan Ali Oguz	KO (punch)	1	1:52	
Bantamweight Kickboxing	(Japan) Yutaro Hori	def.	(Thailand) Duangbuppha Or.Sansuek	TKO (leg kick and knee)	3	0:35	
Women's Atomweight Muay Thai	(Thailand) Tangtang Sor.Dechapan	def.	(Vietnam) Trieu Thi Phuong Thuy	Decision (unanimous)	3	3:00	Only 113 lbs limit, Tangtang missed weight (116 lb).

The Inner Circle 32 (Superfans at Live ONE)
Weight Class				Method	Round	Time	Notes
Flyweight Kickboxing	(Thailand) Lamnamoonlek Or.Atchariya	def.	(Thailand) Panpayak Jitmuangnon	Decision (split)	3	3:00	Panpayak missed weight (136.6 lb).
Flyweight Kickboxing	(Thailand) Kongthoranee Sor.Sommai	def.	(China) Yuan Pengjie	Decision (unanimous)	3	3:00	
Women's Flyweight Muay Thai	(Switzerland) Zoe Neuschwander	def.	(Indonesia) Susanti Ndapataka	Decision (unanimous)	3	3:00	
Featherweight Muay Thai	(Russia) Konstantin Shakhtarin	def.	(France) Enzo Kartoum	KO (spinning back elbow)	1	1:58	
Strawweight Kickboxing	(Kazakhstan) Arsen Soiyrkas	def.	(Japan) Jin Mandokoro	Decision (unanimous)	3	3:00	

== ONE Friday Fights 173 & The Inner Circle 33 ==
ONE Friday Fights 173: Tonglampoon vs. Tobias / The Inner Circle 33
- Promotion: ONE Championship
- Date: October 2, 2026
- Venue: Lumpinee Boxing Stadium
- City: Bangkok, Thailand

ONE Friday Fights 173: Tonglampoon vs. Tobias (also known as ONE Lumpinee 173) / The Inner Circle 33 was a combat sports event produced by ONE Championship that took place on October 2, 2026, at Lumpinee Boxing Stadium in Bangkok, Thailand.

=== Background ===
A strawweight Muay Thai bout between Tonglampoon FA.Group and Dionatha Santos Tobias headlined the event.

=== Bonus awards ===
The following fighters received $10,000 bonuses:

- Performance of the Night: Cal Cook, Dzhamil Osmanov and Sheila Barrios

=== Results ===
ONE Friday Fights 173 (YouTube / Facebook)
Weight Class				Method	Round	Time	Notes
Strawweight Muay Thai	(Thailand) Tonglampoon FA.Group	def.	(Brazil) Dionatha Santos Tobias	Decision (split)	3	3:00	
Strawweight Muay Thai	(Thailand) Payakrut Suajantokmuaythai	def.	(Ukraine) Andrii Mezentsev	Decision (split)	3	3:00	
Flyweight Muay Thai	(United Kingdom) Cal Cook	def.	(Thailand) Nongkhailek Dr.Knotmuaythai	TKO (3 knockdowns)	1	2:34	
Flyweight Muay Thai	(Thailand) Panpakan Sor.Sasiwat	def.	(Thailand) Petkongfa Wor.Technoluangpusuang	Decision (unanimous)	3	3:00	
Atomweight Muay Thai	(Thailand) Gaichon Sor.Prawatmuang	def.	(Thailand) Tandiao Por.Prawit	Decision (unanimous)	3	3:00	
Flyweight MMA	(Qatar) Imran Satiev	def.	(Afghanistan) Babar Ali	Submission (guillotine choke)	1	3:06	
Women's Strawweight Muay Thai	(Australia) Joanne La	def.	(Lebanon) Yara Saleh	Decision (split)	3	3:00	
Bantamweight MMA	(South Korea) Park Jong-jun	def.	(Egypt) Youssef Ramadan	TKO (knee punches)	2	1:29	
Strawweight Muay Thai	(Japan) Hiroyuki	def.	(Mexico) Kevin Oyervides	KO (leg kick and punch)	2	1:04	

The Inner Circle 33 (Superfans at Live ONE)
Weight Class				Method	Round	Time	Notes
Lightweight Muay Thai	(Suriname) Regian Eersel (c)	def.	(United Kingdom) George Jarvis	KO (punch)	4	1:39	For the ONE Lightweight Muay Thai World Championship.
Women's Atomweight Muay Thai	(Thailand) Duangdawnoi Looksaikongdin	def.	(Switzerland) Aline Seiberth	Decision (unanimous)	3	3:00	
Bantamweight Kickboxing	(Russia) Dzhamil Osmanov	def.	(United Kingdom) Ben Woolliss	TKO (3 knockdowns)	1	1:24	
Women's Atomweight Muay Thai	(Argentina) Sheila Barrios	def.	(United Kingdom) Mia Trevorrow	KO (punches)	2	2:22	
Strawweight Muay Thai	(Japan) Yugo Kato	def.	(Thailand) Fahlab ToyotaRayong	KO (punch to the body)	1	1:13	

== ONE Fight Night 48 ==
ONE Fight Night 48: Erdogan vs. Elliott
- Promotion: ONE Championship
- Date: October 3, 2026
- Venue: Lumpinee Boxing Stadium
- City: Bangkok, Thailand

ONE Fight Night 48: Erdogan vs. Elliott was a combat sports event produced by ONE Championship that took place on October 3, 2026, at Lumpinee Boxing Stadium in Bangkok, Thailand.

=== Background ===
A heavyweight bout between Shamil Erdogan and Paul Elliott headlined the event.

At the weigh-ins, one fighter failed to hydration test and missed weight for their respective fights:

- Antonio Cesar weighted in at 138.6 pounds, 3.6 pounds over the flyweight limit and he was fined 30 percent of his purse which went to Joshua Pereira.

=== Bonus awards ===
The following fighters received $50,000 bonuses:

- Performance of the Night: Shamil Erdogan

=== Results ===
ONE Fight Night 48 (Amazon Prime Video)
Weight Class				Method	Round	Time	Notes
Heavyweight MMA	(Turkey) Shamil Erdogan	def.	(United Kingdom) Paul Elliott	Submission (rear-naked choke)	2	3:32	
Bantamweight Muay Thai	(Iran) Parham Gheirati	def.	(Thailand) Nakrob Fairtex	Decision (unanimous)	3	3:00	
Featherweight Muay Thai	(United States) Luke Lessei	def.	(United Kingdom) Charlie Guest	Decision (unanimous)	3	3:00	
Flyweight MMA	(Brazil) Antonio Cesar	def.	(United States) Joshua Pereira	TKO (eye injury)	1	5:00	Cesar missed weight (138.6 lb).
Bantamweight Kickboxing	(Russia) Elbrus Osmanov	def.	(China) Yi Yuxuan	Decision (split)	3	3:00	
Featherweight Submission Grappling	(Brazil) Ruan Alvarenga	def.	(Japan) Shoya Ishiguro	Decision (split)	1	10:00	
Women's Atomweight Muay Thai	(Hong Kong) Yu Yau Pui	def.	(Republic of Ireland) Marie McManamon	Decision (unanimous)	3	3:00	
Featherweight Muay Thai	(United States) Arian Esparza	def.	(New Zealand) Samuel Fitzgerald	KO (punch)	1	2:35	

== ONE Friday Fights 174 & The Inner Circle 34 ==
ONE Friday Fights 174: Dedduanglek vs. Mongkoldetlek / The Inner Circle 34
- Promotion: ONE Championship
- Date: October 9, 2026
- Venue: Lumpinee Boxing Stadium
- City: Bangkok, Thailand

ONE Friday Fights 174: Dedduanglek vs. Mongkoldetlek (also known as ONE Lumpinee 174) / The Inner Circle 34 was a combat sports event produced by ONE Championship that took place on October 9, 2026, at Lumpinee Boxing Stadium in Bangkok, Thailand.

=== Background ===
A bantamweight Muay Thai bout between Dedduanglek Torfunfarm and Mongkoldetlek Por.Pim-on headlined the event.

=== Bonus awards ===
The following fighters received $10,000 bonuses:

- Performance of the Night: Dedduanglek Torfunfarm, Petmanee P.K.SiamaxMP.Service, PetUbon Sor.Tienchai and Yodthewin Mor.Rajabhatmubanchombueng

=== Results ===
ONE Friday Fights 174 (YouTube / Facebook)
Weight Class				Method	Round	Time	Notes
Bantamweight Muay Thai	(Thailand) Dedduanglek Torfunfarm	def.	(Thailand) Mongkoldetlek Por.Pim-on	KO (punches)	2	1:26	
Flyweight Muay Thai	(Thailand) Khundet P.K.Saenchai	def.	(Thailand) Kiwthong TKD.Muaythai	Decision (majority)	3	3:00	
Featherweight Muay Thai	(Thailand) Pet Sitchalongsak	def.	(Thailand) Singharat Sitkhuntab	Decision (unanimous)	3	3:00	
Flyweight Muay Thai	(Thailand) Petmanee P.K.SiamaxMP.Service	def.	D-Max KrutikMS.SportThailand	TKO (3 knockdowns)	1	2:41	
Flyweight Muay Thai	(Thailand) PetUbon Sor.Tienchai	def.	(Thailand) Sudsab Sor.Sasiwat	TKO (3 knockdowns)	2	1:53	
Featherweight MMA	(Nigeria) Philemon Bitrus Jeb	def.	(Mongolia) Batireedui Ganbaatar	Decision (unanimous)	3	5:00	
Women's Atomweight Muay Thai	(Thailand) Chabakaew Sor.Kanjanchai	def.	(Hong Kong) Yana Yip	Decision (unanimous)	3	3:00	
Featherweight Kickboxing	(Japan) Naoki Morita	def.	(Spain) Omar El Morabet	Decision (unanimous)	3	3:00	

The Inner Circle 34 (Superfans at Live ONE)
Weight Class				Method	Round	Time	Notes
Flyweight Muay Thai	(Russia) Rustam Yunusov	def.	(Thailand) Suriyanlek Por.Yenying	Decision (unanimous)	3	3:00	Suriyanlek missed weight (138.8 lb).
Bantamweight Muay Thai	(Sweden) Linus Bylander	def.	(Australia) Tyson Harrison	Decision (unanimous)	3	3:00	
Bantamweight Muay Thai	(Thailand) Kongsuk Fairtex	def.	(Russia) Ruslan Tuktarov	Decision (split)	3	3:00	
Featherweight Muay Thai	(Thailand) Yodthewin Mor. Rajabhatmubanchombueng	def.	(Iran) Arman Moradi	KO (punch)	2	1:28	
Strawweight Kickboxing	(Thailand) Attachai Kelasport	def.	(Japan) Kojiro Shiba	Decision (unanimous)	3	3:00	

== ONE Friday Fights 175 & The Inner Circle 35 ==
ONE Friday Fights 175: Lamsing vs. Rhenimi / The Inner Circle 35
- Promotion: ONE Championship
- Date: October 16, 2026
- Venue: Lumpinee Boxing Stadium
- City: Bangkok, Thailand

ONE Friday Fights 175: Lamsing vs. Rhenimi (also known as ONE Lumpinee 175) / The Inner Circle 35 was a combat sports event produced by ONE Championship that took place on October 16, 2026, at Lumpinee Boxing Stadium in Bangkok, Thailand.

=== Background ===
A flyweight Muay Thai bout between Lamsing T1.FightAcademy and Abdessamie Rhenimi headlined the event.

=== Bonus awards ===
The following fighters received $10,000 bonuses:

- Performance of the Night: Abdessamie Rhenimi, Mahesuan Aekmuangnon, Slatan Jitmuangnon, Tepatip Champkhaomootod, Shosuke Iwanaga and Olivia Bahsous

=== Results ===
ONE Friday Fights 175 (YouTube / Facebook)
Weight Class				Method	Round	Time	Notes
Flyweight Muay Thai	(Morocco) Abdessamie Rhenimi	def.	(Thailand) Lamsing T1.FightAcademy	KO (punches)	3	1:51	
Atomweight Muay Thai	(Thailand) Mahesuan Aekmuangnon	def.	(Thailand) Bakjo Sitkhunma	TKO (3 knockdowns)	2	2:06	
Bantamweight Muay Thai	(Thailand) Kampeethewada Sitthikul	def.	(Mexico) Anuar Cisneros	TKO (doctor stoppage)	2	3:00	
Flyweight Muay Thai	(Thailand) Slatan Jitmuangnon	def.	(Iran) Babak Haghi	KO (punch)	1	2:34	
Strawweight Muay Thai	(Thailand) Tepatip Champkhaomootod	def.	(Thailand) Chokpreecha P.K.TomTK.Alaiyont	KO (punch)	2	1:04	
Strawweight MMA	(Indonesia) Sanjaya Hutagaol	def.	(Spain) Javier Cabrera	Submission (rear-naked choke)	2	2:54	
Strawweight Muay Thai	(Thailand) Pichai Mor.Rajabhatkorat	def.	(Thailand) Hatthep Sor.Sasiwat	Decision (unanimous)	3	3:00	
Flyweight MMA	(Japan) Yuto Shioya	def.	(India) Ashok Bagade	Decision (unanimous)	3	5:00	
Strawweight Kickboxing	(Japan) Shosuke Iwanaga	def.	(China) Yang Guiyao	KO (head kick)	2	1:13	

The Inner Circle 35 (Superfans at Live ONE)
Weight Class				Method	Round	Time	Notes
Strawweight Kickboxing	(China) Wang Junguang	def.	(Thailand) Prajanchai P.K.Saenchai	Decision (split)	3	3:00	
Flyweight Muay Thai	(Malaysia) Johan Ghazali	def.	(United States) Diego Paez	Decision (unanimous)	3	3:00	
Flyweight Muay Thai	(Thailand) Jaradchai Maxjandee	def.	(Morocco) Ayoub Yassine	Decision (unanimous)	3	3:00	
Women's 102 lbs Muay Thai	(Canada) Olivia Bahsous	def.	(United States) Malia Weaver	TKO (3 knockdowns)	2	2:46	
Strawweight Muay Thai	(Thailand) Face Erawan	def.	(Moldova) Valerii Strungari	Decision (unanimous)	3	3:00	Strungari missed weight (125.6 lb).

== ONE Samurai 4 ==
ONE Samurai 4
- Promotion: ONE Championship
- Date: October 17, 2026
- Venue: Ariake Arena
- City: Tokyo, Japan

ONE Samurai 4 was a combat sports event produced by ONE Championship that took place on October 17, 2026, at Ariake Arena in Tokyo, Japan.

=== Background ===
A ONE Bantamweight Kickboxing World Championship bout between current champion (also former ONE Bantamweight and Flyweight Muay Thai World Champion) Jonathan Haggerty and former champion Hiroki Akimoto headlined the event.

A ONE Atomweight Muay Thai World Championship bout between current champion Nadaka Yoshinari and Rifdean Masdor served as the event.

=== Bonus awards ===
The following fighters received bonuses:

- Performance of the Night ($95,000): Jonathan Haggerty and Nadaka Yoshinari
- Performance of the Night ($45,000): Sinsamut Klinmee
- Performance of the Night ($9,500): Kota Abe, Toki Tamaru, Shoma Okumura, Ryoto Nishiyama and Masaki Takeura

=== Results ===
ONE Samurai 4 (PPV at Live ONE)
Weight Class				Method	Round	Time	Notes
Bantamweight Kickboxing	(United Kingdom) Jonathan Haggerty (c)	def.	(Japan) Hiroki Akimoto	TKO (punches and knee)	3	0:42	For the ONE Bantamweight Kickboxing World Championship.
Atomweight Muay Thai	(Japan) Nadaka Yoshinari (c)	def.	(Malaysia) Rifdean Masdor	KO (head kick)	2	0:58	For the ONE Atomweight Muay Thai World Championship. Masdor missed weight (118.6 lb), and Yoshinari Only eligible win the title.
(Japan) Takeru Segawa's Retirement Ceremony & ONE Hall of Fame Induction.
Featherweight Kickboxing	(Japan) Masaaki Noiri	def.	(Iran) Mohammad Siasarani	Decision (split)	3	3:00	For the ONE Samurai Featherweight Kickboxing Tournament Semi-Finals.
Bantamweight Kickboxing	(Algeria) Nabil Anane	def.	(Japan) Yuki Yoza	Decision (unanimous)	3	3:00	
Women's Atomweight MMA	(Japan) Itsuki Hirata	def.	(Malaysia) Jihin Radzuan	Decision (unanimous)	3	5:00	
Lightweight Kickboxing	(Thailand) Sinsamut Klinmee	def.	(Japan) Shintaro Matsukura	KO (head kick)	2	1:17	
Lightweight MMA	(Japan) Kota Abe	def.	(Japan) Shozo Isojima	TKO (punches)	1	1:34	
Strawweight Kickboxing	(Japan) Shoma Okumura	def.	(Japan) Toki Tamaru	Decision (unanimous)	3	3:00	
Flyweight MMA	(Japan) Ryoto Nishiyama	def.	(Japan) Yu Takeuchi	KO (punch)	1	0:58	
Lightweight Submission Grappling	(Japan) Masaki Takeura	def.	(Japan) Yoshinari Fukushima	Submission (heel hook)	1	5:13	

== ONE Friday Fights 176 & The Inner Circle 36 ==
ONE Friday Fights 176: Khunsuk vs. YodUdon / The Inner Circle 36
- Promotion: ONE Championship
- Date: October 30, 2026
- Venue: Lumpinee Boxing Stadium
- City: Bangkok, Thailand

ONE Friday Fights 176: Khunsuk vs. YodUdon (also known as ONE Lumpinee 176) / The Inner Circle 36 was a combat sports event produced by ONE Championship that took place on October 30, 2026, at Lumpinee Boxing Stadium in Bangkok, Thailand.

=== Background ===
A flyweight Muay Thai bout between Rambong Sor.Therapat and Jacob Thompson was scheduled to headline the event. but the bout was canceled after Thompson has an illness, therefore, an atomweight Muay Thai bout between Khunsuk T1.FightAcademy and YodUdon K.Tongtalingchan headlined the event.

=== Bonus awards ===
The following fighters received $10,000 bonuses:

- Performance of the Night: Khunsuk T1.FightAcademy, Sitthichai Sor.Dechapan, Adham Ruziev, Oga Akita and Xavier Gonzalez

=== Results ===
ONE Friday Fights 176 (YouTube / Facebook)
Weight Class				Method	Round	Time	Notes
Atomweight Muay Thai	(Thailand) Khunsuk T1.FightAcademy	def.	(Thailand) YodUdon K.Tongtalingchan	KO (punch to the body)	2	2:59	
Flyweight Muay Thai	(Thailand) Sitthichai Sor.Dechapan	def.	(France) Arthur Evan	KO (punches, knees, elbows and head kick)	2	2:55	
Strawweight Muay Thai	(Thailand) Caviar Pudprachachuen	def.	(Thailand) Klapichit K.Tongtalingchan	Decision (split)	3	3:00	
Featherweight MMA	(Portugal) Pedro Duarte	def.	(New Zealand) Ethan Brockett	TKO (punches)	1	2:53	Duarte missed weight (162.2 lb).
Strawweight Muay Thai	(Uzbekistan) Adham Ruziev	def.	(Thailand) Denchailek Sor.Dechapan	KO (punch to the body)	1	1:14	
Flyweight MMA	(Japan) Oga Akita	def.	(India) Prashanth Guda	TKO (punches)	1	2:08	
Strawweight Kickboxing	(Japan) Yumeto Mizuno	def.	(Azerbaijan) Nihad Taghizade	TKO (leg injury)	2	2:13	

The Inner Circle 36 (Superfans at Live ONE)
Weight Class				Method	Round	Time	Notes
Atomweight Muay Thai	(Algeria) Akram Hamidi	def.	(Thailand) Numsurin Chor.Ketwina	KO (punches to the body)	1	1:58	Hamidi missed weight (119.6 lb).
Flyweight Muay Thai	(Spain) Xavier Gonzalez	def.	(Thailand) Exza Wankhongohm WKO	KO (punch)	1	1:18	
Bantamweight Muay Thai	(Morocco) Yassir Rassafi	def.	(Thailand) Tomyamkoong Bhumjaithai	KO (head kick)	1	2:41	Only 136 lbs limit, Rassafi missed weight (137.6 lb).
Bantamweight Kickboxing	(Japan) Ranma	def.	(France) Evan Gambuto	Decision (unanimous)	3	3:00	
Strawweight Muay Thai	(Thailand) Superbest Winnermuaythai	def.	(Japan) Raize	Decision (unanimous)	3	3:00	

== ONE Friday Fights 177 & The Inner Circle 37 ==
ONE Friday Fights 177: Isannuea vs. Jack / The Inner Circle 37
- Promotion: ONE Championship
- Date: November 6, 2026
- Venue: Lumpinee Boxing Stadium
- City: Bangkok, Thailand

ONE Friday Fights 177: Isannuea vs. Jack (also known as ONE Lumpinee 177) / The Inner Circle 37 was a combat sports event produced by ONE Championship that took place on November 6, 2026, at Lumpinee Boxing Stadium in Bangkok, Thailand.

=== Background ===
A bantamweight Muay Thai bout between Isannuea Chotbangsaen and Jack Siatarnyokkrok P.K headlined the event.

=== Bonus awards ===
The following fighters received bonuses:

- Performance of the Night ($100,000): Tye Ruotolo
- Performance of The Night ($10,000): Superball Sit Chor. and Titus Proctor

=== Results ===
ONE Friday Fights 177 (YouTube / Facebook)
Weight Class				Method	Round	Time	Notes
Bantamweight Muay Thai	(Thailand) Jack Siatarnyokkrok P.K	def.	(Thailand) Isannuea Chotbangsaen	Decision (unanimous)	3	3:00	
Flyweight Muay Thai	(Thailand) Superball Sit Chor.	def.	(Thailand) Saksri SuperlekMuaythai	KO (punches)	1	1:42	
Atomweight Muay Thai	(Thailand) Chatpet Suablackmuaythai	def.	(Laos) Saipetlek CoachnatSamartmuaythai	Decision (unanimous)	3	3:00	
Atomweight Muay Thai	(Laos) Chaisongkram Looksuan	def.	(Thailand) Petdam BS.Muaythai	Decision (unanimous)	3	3:00	
Women's Atomweight Muay Thai	(Thailand) Klinphaka Por.Thaisong	def.	(China) Ran Longshu	KO (punch to the body)	2	0:57	
Flyweight Kickboxing	(Japan) Kazuteru Yamazaki	def.	(Thailand) Phun SueaMuang	Decision (unanimous)	3	3:00	
Bantamweight MMA	(Thailand) Bos Chayut	def.	(Japan) Kentaro Okumura	TKO (knees and punches)	3	1:21	
Atomweight Kickboxing	(Japan) Yuto	def.	(Thailand) Okazaki Silkmuaythai	Decision (unanimous)	3	3:00	
Flyweight Kickboxing	(Latvia) Marats Jankovskis	def.	(Japan) Retsu Sashida	Decision (unanimous)	3	3:00	

The Inner Circle 37 (Superfans at Live ONE)
Weight Class				Method	Round	Time	Notes
Lightweight MMA	(United States) Tye Ruotolo	def.	(United States) Christian Lee (c)	Submission (rear-naked choke)	1	2:08	For the ONE Lightweight World Championship.
Bantamweight Muay Thai	(Thailand) Yodphupa Petkiatpet	def.	(Thailand) Komawut FA.Group	Decision (split)	3	3:00	
Flyweight Muay Thai	(Egypt) Tantawy Ahmed Hafez	def.	(Thailand) Kongchai Chanaidonmuang	Decision (unanimous)	3	3:00	
Lightweight Muay Thai	(New Zealand) Titus Proctor	def.	(Poland) Maciej Karpinski	KO (punch to the body)	3	1:27	
Strawweight Muay Thai	(Thailand) Dabdam PorTorThor.Thongtawee	def.	(United Kingdom) Cal Cook	Decision (unanimous)	3	3:00	

== ONE Fight Night 49 ==
ONE Fight Night 49: Gabriel vs. Magomedov
- Promotion: ONE Championship
- Date: November 7, 2026
- Venue: Lumpinee Boxing Stadium
- City: Bangkok, Thailand

ONE Fight Night 49: Gabriel vs. Magomedov was a combat sports event produced by ONE Championship that took place on November 7, 2026, at Lumpinee Boxing Stadium in Bangkok, Thailand.

=== Background ===
A lightweight bout between Lucas Gabriel and Magomed Magomedov headlined the event.

At the weigh-ins, two fighters failed to hydration test and missed weight for their respective fights:

- Magomed Magomedov weighted in at 175.4 pounds, 5.4 pounds over the lightweight limit and he was fined 30 percent of his purse which went to Lucas Gabriel.
- Gasham Mammadov weighted in at 173 pounds, 3 pounds over the lightweight limit and he was fined 30 percent of his purse which went to Bogdan Shumarov.

=== Results ===
ONE Fight Night 49 (Amazon Prime Video)
Weight Class				Method	Round	Time	Notes
Lightweight MMA	(Bahrain) Magomed Magomedov	def.	(Brazil) Lucas Gabriel	Decision (split)	3	5:00	Magomedov missed weight (175.4 lb).
Flyweight Kickboxing	(Japan) Taiki Naito	def.	(Thailand) Kongthoranee Sor.Sommai	Decision (unanimous)	3	3:00	
Strawweight MMA	(South Korea) Lee Seung-chul	def.	(India) Nazareth Lalthazuala	Submission (rear-naked choke)	2	3:04	
Bantamweight Muay Thai	(Thailand) Nonthachai Jitmuangnon	def.	(Brazil) Felipe Lobo	Decision (unanimous)	3	3:00	
Featherweight Kickboxing	(China) Zhou Jiaqiang	def.	(Russia) Mamuka Usubyan	Decision (split)	3	3:00	
Women's Atomweight MMA	(Poland) Magdalena Czaban	def.	(Brazil) Victória Souza	Decision (unanimous)	3	5:00	
Lightweight Kickboxing	(Bulgaria) Bogdan Shumarov	def.	(Azerbaijan) Gasham Mammadov	Decision (unanimous)	3	3:00	Mammadov missed weight (173 lb).
Openweight Submission Grappling	(Brazil) Victor Hugo	def.	(United States) Devhonte Johnson	Submission (rear-naked choke)	1	1:35	
Bantamweight MMA	(France) Ilmadi Israilov	def.	(Tajikistan) Kalandar Tabarov	Decision (unanimous)	3	5:00	

== ONE Friday Fights 178 & The Inner Circle 38 ==
ONE Friday Fights 178: Supalek vs. Mammadov / The Inner Circle 38
- Promotion: ONE Championship
- Date: November 13, 2026
- Venue: Lumpinee Boxing Stadium
- City: Bangkok, Thailand

ONE Friday Fights 178: Supalek vs. Mammadov (also known as ONE Lumpinee 178) / The Inner Circle 38 was a combat sports event produced by ONE Championship that took place on November 13, 2026, at Lumpinee Boxing Stadium in Bangkok, Thailand.

=== Background ===
A bantamweight Muay Thai bout between Supalek Jitmuangnon and Anar Mammadov headlined the event.

=== Bonus awards ===
The following fighters received $10,000 bonuses:

- Performance of the Night: Anar Mammadov, Superchamp Wutdychonburipraleasing and Banluelok Sitwatcharachai

=== Results ===
ONE Friday Fights 178 (YouTube / Facebook)
Weight Class				Method	Round	Time	Notes
Bantamweight Muay Thai	(Azerbaijan) Anar Mammadov	def.	(Thailand) Supalek Jitmuangnon	KO (punch)	1	2:09	
Bantamweight Muay Thai	(Myanmar) Kyaw Swar Win	def.	(Tajikistan) Sherzodi Sadullo	Decision (unanimous)	3	3:00	
Atomweight Muay Thai	(Turkey) Cihan Dogu	def.	(Thailand) Pek PorTorThor.Thongtawee	Decision (unanimous)	3	3:00	
Strawweight Muay Thai	(Iraq) Ali Al-kinani	def.	(Thailand) Kumanngern Jitmuangnon	KO (punch)	2	1:24	
Strawweight MMA	(Thailand) Nattakorn Kesorn	def.	(Philippines) Mathew Gesto	Decision (split)	3	5:00	
Strawweight Muay Thai	(Thailand) Superchamp Wutdychonburipraleasing	def.	(Thailand) Superjung Sor.Rungsak	KO (punches to the body)	1	1:58	
Bantamweight MMA	(South Korea) Kim Su-hyeon	def.	(Japan) Takumi Fukamachi	Decision (split)	3	5:00	
Women's Atomweight Muay Thai	(Thailand) Nongnuk Sor.Dechapan	def.	(Italy) Giorgia Pieropan	Decision (unanimous)	3	3:00	
Flyweight Muay Thai	(Japan) Shimon Yoshinari	def.	(Lebanon) Ramadan Ondash	Decision (unanimous)	3	3:00	For the ONE Flyweight Muay Thai World Grand Prix Quarter-Finals.

The Inner Circle 38 (Superfans at Live ONE)
Weight Class				Method	Round	Time	Notes
Flyweight Muay Thai	(Thailand) Nong-O Hama	def.	(Thailand) Rodtang Jitmuangnon	Decision (unanimous)	3	3:00	For the ONE Flyweight Muay Thai World Grand Prix Quarter-Finals.
Bantamweight Muay Thai	(Thailand) PTT Apichartfarm	def.	(Morocco) Hamza Rachid	KO (punch)	1	2:37	PTT missed weight (147.6 lb).
Bantamweight Muay Thai	(Italy) Lenny Blasi	def.	(Morocco) Adam Benwarwar	Decision (unanimous)	3	3:00	
Flyweight Muay Thai	(Laos) Songpandin Chor.Kaewwiset	def.	(Thailand) PetUbon Jitmuangnon	Decision (split)	3	3:00	Only 132 lbs limit, Songpandin missed weight (136 lb).
Atomweight Muay Thai	(Thailand) Banluelok Sitwatcharachai	def.	(Myanmar) Mya Lone Chaw	KO (punches)	2	1:04	

== ONE Samurai 5 ==
ONE Samurai 5
- Promotion: ONE Championship
- Date: November 18, 2026
- Venue: Ebara Wave Arena Ota
- City: Tokyo, Japan

ONE Samurai 5 was a combat sports event produced by ONE Championship that took place on November 18, 2026, at Ebara Wave Arena Ota in Tokyo, Japan.

=== Background ===
A ONE Strawweight World Championship bout between current champion Joshua Pacio and Keito Yamakita headlined the event.

=== Bonus awards ===
The following fighters received bonuses:

- Performance of the Night (45,000): Ryujin Nasukawa
- Performance of the Night ($30,000): Masashi Kumura

=== Results ===
ONE Samurai 5 (PPV at Live ONE)
Weight Class				Method	Round	Time	Notes
Strawweight MMA	(Philippines) Joshua Pacio (c)	def.	(Japan) Keito Yamakita	Submission (arm-triangle choke)	4	4:17	For the ONE Strawweight World Championship.
Strawweight Kickboxing	(Japan) Ryujin Nasukawa	def.	(Japan) Raichi Nagai	KO (punch)	1	0:36	
Strawweight MMA	(United States) Jarred Brooks	def.	(Japan) Tatsumitsu Wada	Decision (split)	3	5:00	
Strawweight Kickboxing	(Japan) Masashi Kumura	def.	(United Kingdom) Ellis Badr Barboza	TKO (3 knockdowns)	1	2:58	
Featherweight Kickboxing	(Japan) Yutaro Asahi	def.	(Thailand) Petchtanong Petchfergus	Decision (unanimous)	3	3:00	Only 150 lbs limit, Asahi missed weight (152 lb).
Heavyweight MMA	(Japan) Ryugo Takeuchi	def.	(Japan) Brandon Hashimoto	TKO (punches)	1	0:23	
Strawweight Kickboxing	(Japan) Reiji Takaki	def.	(Portugal) Rui Botelho	Decision (unanimous)	3	3:00	
Strawweight Muay Thai	(Japan) Jurai Ishii	def.	(Japan) Yugo Kato	Decision (unanimous)	3	3:00	
Bantamweight Kickboxing	(Japan) Gump	def.	(Japan) Shuto Inui	Decision (unanimous)	3	3:00	Gump missed weight (148 lb).
Featherweight MMA	(Japan) Shosuke Kinoshita	def.	(Japan) Takuya Shibamura	Decision (unanimous)	3	5:00	

== ONE Friday Fights 179 & The Inner Circle 39 ==
ONE Friday Fights 179: Chartpayak vs. Klarob / The Inner Circle 39
- Promotion: ONE Championship
- Date: November 20, 2026
- Venue: Lumpinee Boxing Stadium
- City: Bangkok, Thailand

ONE Friday Fights 179: Chartpayak vs. Klarob (also known as ONE Lumpinee 179) / The Inner Circle 39 was a combat sports event produced by ONE Championship that took place on November 20, 2026, at Lumpinee Boxing Stadium in Bangkok, Thailand.

=== Background ===
A flyweight Muay Thai bout between Chartpayak Saksatoon and Klarob Nuikafeboran headlined the event.

=== Bonus awards ===
The following fighters received $10,000 bonuses:

- Performance of the Night: Superjeng Torfunfarm, Rahim Tcherchaiko, Chalamkaw VenumMuaythai, Alessio Malatesta and Salai Htan Khee Shein

=== Results ===
ONE Friday Fights 179 (YouTube / Facebook)
Weight Class				Method	Round	Time	Notes
Flyweight Muay Thai	(Thailand) Klarob Nuikafeboran	def.	(Thailand) Chartpayak Saksatoon	Decision (unanimous)	3	3:00	
Bantamweight Muay Thai	(Thailand) Superjeng Torfunfarm	def.	(Thailand) Wuttikrai Wor.Chakrawut	KO (punch)	2	2:37	
Flyweight Muay Thai	(Belgium) Rahim Tcherchaiko	def.	(Thailand) Sunvo Torfunfarm	KO (knee)	2	1:36	
Bantamweight Muay Thai	(Thailand) Chalamkaw VenumMuaythai	def.	(Thailand) Natty Dodds	KO (head kick)	1	0:24	
Bantamweight MMA	(Tajikistan) Lutfullo Sohibnazarov	def.	(Azerbaijan) Mirmehti Miriyev	Submission (arm-triangle choke)	3	3:30	
Flyweight Muay Thai	(Thailand) Chalamdam Yotharakmuaythai	def.	(Thailand) Chaiheng Patcharagym	Decision (split)	3	3:00	
Lightweight MMA	(Philippines) Hero Marco Manguray	def.	(South Korea) Kang Min-sung	Decision (unanimous)	3	5:00	
Women's Atomweight Muay Thai	(Japan) Kana Oshikawa	def.	(Thailand) Kwankhao Pitaknongrua	TKO (punches)	1	1:35	
Strawweight Kickboxing	(Japan) Fuga Tokoro	def.	(China) Sheng Yiyang	Decision (unanimous)	3	3:00	

The Inner Circle 39 (Superfans at Live ONE)
Weight Class				Method	Round	Time	Notes
Flyweight Muay Thai	(Russia) Asadula Imangazaliev (c)	def.	(Uzbekistan) Aslamjon Ortikov	Decision (split)	5	3:00	For the ONE Flyweight Muay Thai World Championship and ONE Flyweight Muay Thai World Grand Prix Quarter-Finals.
Flyweight Muay Thai	(Pakistan) Ubaid Hussain	def.	(Thailand) Black Panther VenumMuaythai	Decision (unanimous)	3	3:00	For the ONE Flyweight Muay Thai World Grand Prix Quarter-Finals.
Strawweight Muay Thai	(Thailand) Attachai Kelasport	def.	(Laos) Petnamkhong Sor.Maneekhot	Decision (unanimous)	3	3:00	
Featherweight Muay Thai	(Italy) Alessio Malatesta	def.	(Uzbekistan) Uzair Ismoiljonov	TKO (3 knockdowns)	2	1:09	
Atomweight Muay Thai	(Myanmar) Salai Htan Khee Shein	def.	(Thailand) Rak Erawan	KO (punches)	2	1:09	

== ONE Friday Fights 180 & The Inner Circle 40 ==
ONE Friday Fights 180 / The Inner Circle 40
- Promotion: ONE Championship
- Date: November 27, 2026
- Venue: Lumpinee Boxing Stadium
- City: Bangkok, Thailand

ONE Friday Fights 180 (also known as ONE Lumpinee 180) / The Inner Circle 40 is an upcoming combat sports event produced by ONE Championship that will take place on November 27, 2026, at Lumpinee Boxing Stadium in Bangkok, Thailand.

=== Bonus awards ===
The following fighters received $10,000 bonuses:

=== Results ===
ONE Friday Fights 180 (YouTube / Facebook)
Weight Class				Method	Round	Time	Notes
Strawweight Muay Thai	(Thailand) Denkriangkrai MavinnMuaythai	vs.	(Myanmar) Thway Lin Hiet				

The Inner Circle 40 (Superfans at Live ONE)
Weight Class				Method	Round	Time	Notes
Bantamweight Muay Thai	(Thailand) Yodkhunpon Sitmonchai	vs.	(Thailand) Detchawalit Silkmuaythai				
Bantamweight Muay Thai	(Thailand) Kongklai Sor.Sommai	vs.	(Thailand) Worapon Lukjaoporongtom				

== ONE Samurai 6 ==
ONE Samurai 6
- Promotion: ONE Championship
- Date: December 2, 2026
- Venue: Yokohama Buntai
- City: Yokohama, Japan

ONE Samurai 6 is an upcoming combat sports event produced by ONE Championship that will take place on December 2, 2026, at Yokohama Buntai in Yokohama, Japan.

=== Bonus awards ===
The following fighters received bonuses:

=== Results ===
ONE Samurai 6 (PPV at Live ONE)
Weight Class				Method	Round	Time	Notes
Women's Atomweight MMA	(Japan) Chihiro Sawada	vs.	(Canada) Anastasia Nikolakakos				For the vacant ONE Women's Atomweight World Championship.
Featherweight Kickboxing	(Japan) Hiromi Wajima	vs.	(Iran) Mohammad Siasarani				
Atomweight Muay Thai	(Japan) Ryuya Okuwaki	vs.	(Thailand) Thongpoon P.K.Saenchai				
Women's Atomweight Kickboxing	(Japan) Misaki Morita	vs.	(Thailand) Duangdawnoi Looksaikongdin				
Bantamweight MMA	(Japan) Taiga Orii	vs.	(Japan) Ryo Hirayama				
Strawweight MMA	(Japan) Hiroba Minowa	vs.	(Brazil) Fabio Henrique				
Bantamweight Kickboxing	(Japan) Taiju Shiratori	vs.	(Japan) Shota Tezuka				

== ONE Friday Fights 181 & The Inner Circle 41 ==
ONE Friday Fights 181 / The Inner Circle 41
- Promotion: ONE Championship
- Date: December 4, 2026
- Venue: Lumpinee Boxing Stadium
- City: Bangkok, Thailand

ONE Friday Fights 181 (also known as ONE Lumpinee 181) / The Inner Circle 41 is an upcoming combat sports event produced by ONE Championship that will take place on December 4, 2026, at Lumpinee Boxing Stadium in Bangkok, Thailand.

=== Bonus awards ===
The following fighters received $10,000 bonuses:

=== Results ===
ONE Friday Fights 181 (YouTube / Facebook)
Weight Class				Method	Round	Time	Notes
TBA	TBA	vs.	TBA				

The Inner Circle 41 (Superfans at Live ONE)
Weight Class				Method	Round	Time	Notes
Atomweight Muay Thai	(Thailand) Songchainoi Kiatsongrit	vs.	(Malaysia) Rifdean Masdor				
Flyweight Kickboxing	(Thailand) Lamnamoonlek Or.Atchariya	vs.	(Thailand) Panpayak Jitmuangnon				
Flyweight Muay Thai	(Morocco) Abdessamie Rhenimi	vs.	(France) Yonis Anane				

== ONE Friday Fights 182 & The Inner Circle 42 ==
ONE Friday Fights 182 / The Inner Circle 42
- Promotion: ONE Championship
- Date: December 11, 2026
- Venue: Lumpinee Boxing Stadium
- City: Bangkok, Thailand

ONE Friday Fights 182 (also known as ONE Lumpinee 182) / The Inner Circle 42 is an upcoming combat sports event produced by ONE Championship that will take place on December 11, 2026, at Lumpinee Boxing Stadium in Bangkok, Thailand.

=== Bonus awards ===
The following fighters received $10,000 bonuses:

=== Results ===
ONE Friday Fights 182 (YouTube / Facebook)
Weight Class				Method	Round	Time	Notes
TBA	TBA	vs.	TBA				

The Inner Circle 42 (Superfans at Live ONE)
Weight Class				Method	Round	Time	Notes
Flyweight Muay Thai	(Malaysia) Johan Ghazali	vs.	(Colombia) Johan Estupiñan				
Bantamweight Kickboxing	(Thailand) Sangarthit Looksaikongdin	vs.	(China) Zhao Chongyang				

== ONE 174 ==
ONE 174
- Promotion: ONE Championship
- Date: December 12, 2026
- Venue: Shanghai Indoor Stadium
- City: Shanghai, China

ONE 174 is an upcoming combat sports event produced by ONE Championship that will take place on December 12, 2026, at Shanghai Indoor Stadium in Shanghai, China.

=== Bonus awards ===
The following fighters received $50,000 bonuses:

=== Results ===
ONE 174 (PPV at Live ONE)
Weight Class				Method	Round	Time	Notes
Featherweight MMA	(China) Tang Kai (c)	vs.	(Mongolia) Enkh-Orgil Baatarkhuu				For the ONE Featherweight World Championship.
Strawweight Kickboxing	(Italy) Jonathan Di Bella (c)	vs.	(China) Wang Junguang				For the ONE Strawweight Kickboxing World Championship.

== ONE Fight Night 50 ==
ONE Fight Night 50
- Promotion: ONE Championship
- Date: December 19, 2026
- Venue: Lumpinee Boxing Stadium
- City: Bangkok, Thailand

ONE Fight Night 50 is an upcoming combat sports event produced by ONE Championship that will take place on December 19, 2026, at Lumpinee Boxing Stadium in Bangkok, Thailand.

=== Bonus awards ===
The following fighters received $50,000 bonuses:

=== Results ===
ONE Fight Night 50 (Amazon Prime Video)
Weight Class				Method	Round	Time	Notes
Featherweight Muay Thai	(France) Bampara Kouyate	vs.	(Argentina) Ricardo Bravo				
Flyweight Submission Grappling	(Brazil) Diogo Reis (c)	vs.	(Brazil) Carlos Oliveira				For the ONE Flyweight Submission Grappling World Championship.
Flyweight Muay Thai	(Thailand) Suablack Tor.Pran49	vs.	(Colombia) Jhordan Estupiñan				
Welterweight MMA	(Switzerland) Maurice Abévi	vs.	(Turkey) Dzhabir Dzhabrailov				
Women's Atomweight Muay Thai	(United States) Selina Flores	vs.	(Japan) Kana Morimoto				
Bantamweight Kickboxing	(Thailand) Ferrari Fairtex	vs.	(Brazil) Denis Souza Jr.				
Flyweight MMA	(Brazil) Antonio Cesar	vs.	(Vietnam) Viet Anh Do				
Featherweight MMA	(Brazil) João Pedro Dantas	vs.	(Kazakhstan) Adlan Umarov				

== See also ==
- List of current ONE fighters
- 2026 in UFC
- 2026 in Professional Fighters League
- 2026 in Cage Warriors
- 2026 in Legacy Fighting Alliance
- 2026 in Rizin Fighting Federation
- 2026 in LUX Fight League
- 2026 in Oktagon MMA
- 2026 in Glory
- 2026 in K-1
- 2026 in RISE
- 2026 in Romanian kickboxing
