= Fighting Entertainment Association =

FEA CHAMPIONSHIP. FEA (Fighting Entertainment Association)
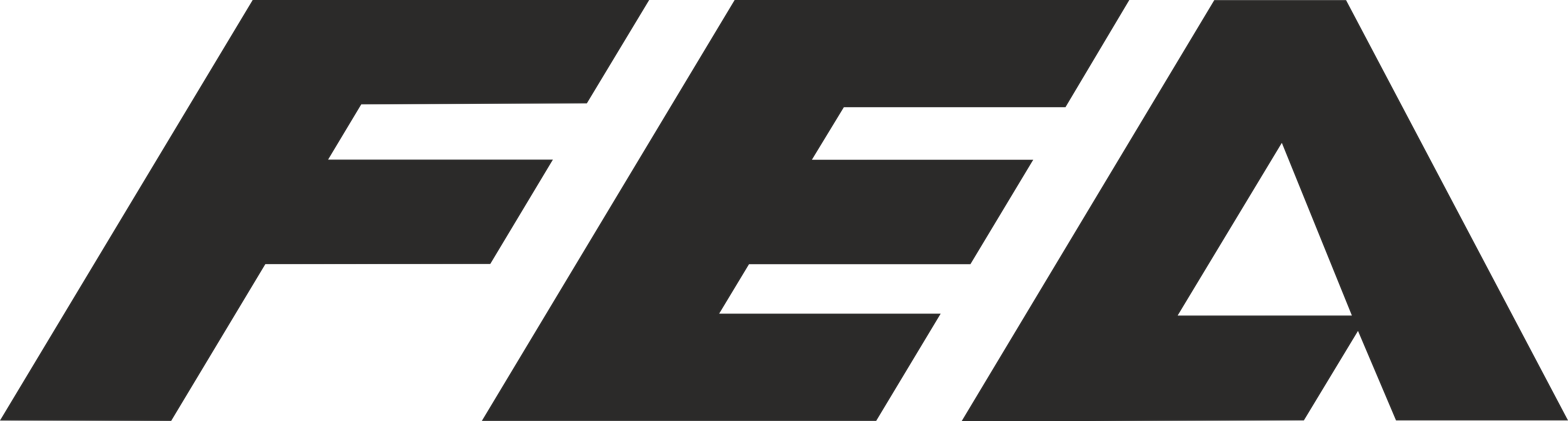
- FEA logo
- Company type: Private
- Industry: Kickboxing MMA promotion
- Founded: 2009
- Founder: Dorin Damir
- Headquarters: Chișinău, Moldova
- Key people: Dorin Damir (President, Owner, Founder)
- Website: www.fea.md www.feafights.tv

FEA, or Fighting Entertainment Association, is a European kickboxing and MMA promotion founded in 2009, which promotes and organizes professional K-1 and MMA tournaments. These projects are popular especially in Europe and CIS countries. The owner and the president of the organization is Dorin Damir.

There are up to six FEA events per year. Each tournament consists of 15 to 19 fights, including title fights, with fighters from all over the world, as well as local Moldovan fighters.

The most popular FEA K-1 fighters within the organization are Stanislav Renita (Moldova), Pavel Zhuravlev (Ukraine), Constantin Rusu (Moldova), Artur Kyshenko (Ukraine), Samir Boukhidous (Netherlands), Mladen Kujundžić (Croatia), Sebastian Ciobanu (Romania), Sergei Lashchenko (Ukraine), Sem Braan (Netherlands), Yana Kunitskaya (Russia), Constantin Țuțu (Moldova), Massaro Glunder (Netherlands), Dmitri Bezus (Ukraine), Sergey Kulyaba (Ukraine), Zakaria Zouggary (Morocco), Ibrahim El Bouni (Netherlands), Tsotne Rogava (Ukraine), Sebastian Cozmâncă (Romania), Radosław Paczuski (Poland), Armen Petrosyan (Italy), Dennis Wosik (Germany), Tomáš Hron (Czech Republic), Freddy Kemayo (France), Simón Santana (Norway), Roman Kryklia (Ukraine/Belarus), Zhora Akopyan (Belarus/Armenia), Cristian Spetcu (Romania), Mikhail Tyuterev (Czech Republic), Mihajlo Kecojevic (Serbia), Nicolai Caraus (Moldova), Vitalie Matei (Moldova), Alexandr Burduja (Moldova) and Esma Hasshass (Morocco).

The most prominent FEA MMA fighters are Valeriu Mircea, Alexandr Romanov (undefeated), Arslan Eslemesov, Martun Mezhlumyan, Luca Poklit, Mihail Sirbu, Mehman Mammadov, Dmytro Predebaylo, Bogdan Barbu,

== History ==
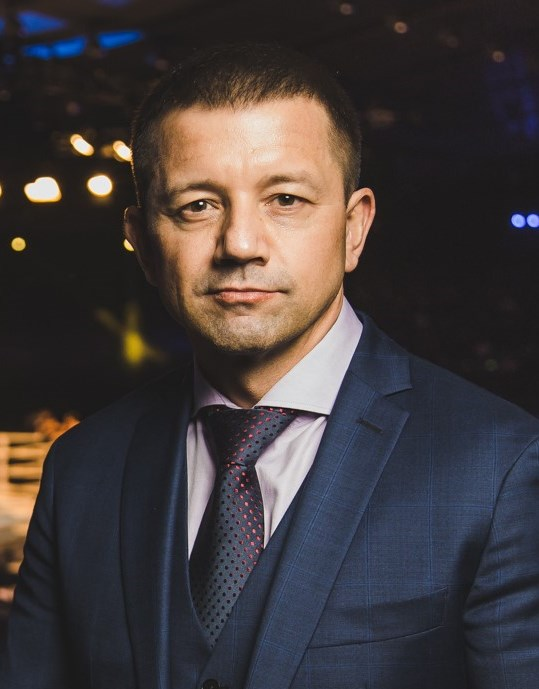
Damir Dorin. Founder, chairman and CEO of FEA.

The founder of FEA, Damir Dorin, got the idea of starting a professional fighting association back in the early 2000s, after visiting Japan and establishing a close relationship with the founder of K-1 fighting promotion Kazuyoshi Ishii. Eventually, in 2009 Dorin founded FEA and hosted the very first professional K-1 rules tournament in Chișinău, Moldova, which also included a Grand Prix tournament. The event was attended by K-1 stars like Ruslan Karaev and Artur Kishenko, chief referee of the tournament Ivan Ippolit and the president of the intercontinental federation BUSHIDO MMA and FEG representative in Europe, Donatas Simanaitis. This led to a partnership with the Lithuanian promotion IBF so in October of next year, FEA dabbled into MMA and organized a joint event, FEA Bushido FC, Moldova vs Europe, which consisted of both K-1 fights and MMA fights.

In December 2010, FEA together with IBF, started the King of Kings project, hosting 56 K-1 rules events in co-promotion over the following years and in numerous European cities. But the events which took place in Chișinău, Moldova, were fully under FEA responsibility.

In 2011 FEA registered the trademark “Fighting Eagles” and organized another K-1 & MMA RULES tournament, including five fights in each section.

In 2016, February 27, FEA started a separate project, and trademarked the name EAGLES FIGHTING CHAMPIONSHIP, for a professional Mixed Martial Arts tournament, traditionally held in an octagonal cage. From that point on FEA organized approximatively three Eagles FC events every year.

The last co-promoted King of Kings event with FEA took place on 24 March 2018 and from then on FEA organized their own events under the name FEA Kickboxing.

FEA Kickboxing made its debut on the Ukrainian market on 24 August 2019 and hosted its event in Odesa. In December of the same year, FEA Kickboxing organized an event which included two Grand Prix tournaments, in the heavyweight and featherweight categories.

Due to the pandemic, all of the scheduled events for 2020 fell off.

In 2021, FEA resumed with a new concept and combined their two projects, FEA Kickboxing and Eagles Fighting Championship. Thus on March 13 of 2021, FEA technically hosted two events in one night: FEA Kickboxing Reset and Eagles FC Reset. Both took place in the cage and without an audience, due to restrictions.

On 13 November 2021 FEA repeated the same concept and hosted FEA Kickboxing, FEA Keep Grinding tournament, as well as Eagles FC Danger Zone on the same day.

In 2022 FEA decided to undergo a rebranding and renamed both their K-1 rules project and the MMA project to "FEA Championship". The decision surrounding the change of EAGLES FC is partly rooted in the fact that Khabib Nurmagomedov started his own fighting project in 2020 and named it similarly (Eagle FC) which created confusion among fans and experts. Further, this also helped to unite FEA's two projects under a single name.

Events were previously broadcast by Fightbox, Eurosport, Canal2, Canal3, Prime, 1+1 VIDEO, SPORT+, XSPORT and other cable operators. Currently, FEA has its own live streaming platform, feafights.tv.

Former and current commentators include Sandy Holt, Valentin Halacenco, Daniel Austin, Łukasz Czarnowski, Celian Varini, Daniel Kendrik, Gheorghiu Ivan, Nikita Vlasov, Pavel Zhuravlev, Vitalii Hurkov.

The ring announcers of FEA K1 are Rytis Kuzmenka, Michael Richie Diamz and Vladimir Marcoci.

The cage announcers for FEA MMA are Anatol Cotrobai, Michael Richie Diamz and Vladimir Marcoci.

== FEA K-1 weight divisions ==
At the moment FEA K-1 operates with the following weigh divisions.

Weight class name	Upper limit	Gender
STRAWWEIGHT	52 kg	Female
FEATHERWEIGHT	65 kg	Male
BANTAMWEIGHT	60 kg	Male
LIGHTWEIGHT	71 kg	Male
WELTERWEIGHT	77 kg	Male
MIDDLEWEIGHT	85 kg	Male
LIGHT HEAVYWEIGHT	95 kg	Male
HEAVYWEIGHT	No limit	Male

== FEA MMA weight divisions ==
Currently FEA MMA has the following active weigh classes.

Weight class name	Upper limit	Gender
STRAWWEIGHT	52 kg	Female
FLYWEIGHT	57 kg	Male
BANTAMWEIGHT	61 kg	Male
FEATHERWEIGHT	65 kg	Male
LIGHTWEIGHT	70 kg	Male
WELTERWEIGHT	77 kg	Male
MIDDLEWEIGHT	84 kg	Male
LIGHT HEAVYWEIGHT	93 kg	Male
HEAVYWEIGHT	120 kg	Male

== Rules ==
=== FEA K-1 rules ===
The rules can be read on the following website.

=== FEA MMA rules ===
The rules can be read on the following website.

== Events ==
=== FEA CHAMPIONSHIP K-1 & MMA RULES EVENTS ===
#	Event	Date	Venue	Location
5	FEA FEA «LEGACY»!	March 30, 2024	FMF Futsal Arena	Ciorescu, Moldova
4	FEA FEA «EQUINOX»!	September 23, 2023	FMF Futsal Arena	Ciorescu, Moldova
3	FEA CHAMPIONSHIP TAKE OFF !	April 8, 2023	FMF Futsal Arena	Ciorescu, Moldova
2	FEA Championship Full-Drive!	December 17, 2022	FMF Futsal Arena	Ciorescu, Moldova
1	FEA CHAMPIONSHIP. LOADING TOURNAMENT.	September 17, 2022	Circus Chișinău	Chișinău, Moldova

=== FEA K-1 EVENTS ===
#	Event	Date	Venue	Location
32	FEA Keepgrinding 2	November 13, 2021	FMF Futsal Arena	Ciorescu, Moldova
31	FEA Kickboxing Reset	March 13, 2022	FMF Futsal Arena	Ciorescu, Moldova
30	FEA Kickboxing WGP	December 7, 2019	FMF Futsal Arena	Ciorescu, Moldova
29	FEA WORLD GP ODESSA. Keep Grinding	August 24, 2019	Palace of Sports Odesa	Odesa, Ukraine
28	FEA WGP vol.28	March 30, 2019	Manej Sport Arena	Chișinău, Moldova
27	FEA 27 K-1 Rules	December 8, 2018	Manej Sport Arena	Chișinău, Moldova
26	FEA WGP vol.26	October 6, 2018	Manej Sport Arena	Chișinău, Moldova
25	KOK WORLD GP Vol, 56	March 24, 2018	Manej Sport Arena	Chișinău, Moldova
24	KOK WORLD GP Vol. 53	December 9, 2017	Manej Sport Arena	Chișinău, Moldova
23	KOK WORLD GP Vol.48	September 30, 2017	Manej Sport Arena	Chișinău, Moldova
22	KOK WORLD GP Vol.46	April 1, 2017	Manej Sport Arena	Chișinău, Moldova
21	KOK WORLD GP Vol.42	December 10, 2016	Manej Sport Arena	Chișinău, Moldova
20	KOK WORLD GP Light Heavyweight tournament	October 1, 2016	Manej Sport Arena	Chișinău, Moldova
19	KOK WGP Middleweight Tournament in Moldova	April 9, 2016	Manej Sport Arena	Chișinău, Moldova
18	KOK WGP Welterweight Tournament EAGLES SERIES	December 19, 2015	Manej Sport Arena	Chișinău, Moldova
17	KOK WGP Heavyweight Tournament. EAGLES SERIES	September 26, 2015	Manej Sport Arena	Chișinău, Moldova
16	KOK WORLD GP Middleweight Tournament	April 4, 2015	Manej Sport Arena	Chișinău, Moldova
15	KOK WORLD GP Heavyweight Tournament. Eagles Series	December 20, 2014	Manej Sport Arena	Chișinău, Moldova
14	KOK WORLD GP Featherweight tournament	September 19, 2014	Manej Sport Arena	Chișinău, Moldova
13	KOK WORLD GP Middleweight Tournament	March 22, 2014	Manej Sport Arena	Chișinău, Moldova
12	EAGLES KOK WORLD SERIES	December 14, 2013	Manej Sport Arena	Chișinău, Moldova
11	KOK WORLD GP Middleweight Tournament	September 28, 2013	Manej Sport Arena	Chișinău, Moldova
10	K-1 World Light Heavyweight Tournament	March 30, 2013	Manej Sport Arena	Chișinău, Moldova
9	"FIGHTING EAGLES" EUROPE SERIES K-1 & MMA RULES	December 15, 2012	Manej Sport Arena	Chișinău, Moldova
8	KOK WORLD GP LIGHTWEIGHT TOURNAMENT	September 29, 2012	Manej Sport Arena	Chișinău, Moldova
7	K.O.K. EUROPE GRAND PRIX Light Welterweight	March 30, 2012	Manej Sport Arena	Chișinău, Moldova
6	FIGHTING EAGLES. EUROPE SERIES K-1 & MMA RULES	December 10, 2011	Manej Sport Arena	Chișinău, Moldova
5	K.O.K. WORLD GRAND PRIX LIGHT HEAVYWEIGHT	October 10, 2011	Manej Sport Arena	Chișinău, Moldova
4	K.O.K. EUROPE GRAND PRIX	April 16, 2011	Manej Sport Arena	Chișinău, Moldova
3	K.O.K. WORLD GRAND PRIX	December 11, 2010	USEFS Universitatea de Stat de Educaţie Fizică şi Sport	Chișinău, Moldova
2	FEA Bushido FC Moldova VS Europe	October 9, 2010	USEFS Universitatea de Stat de Educaţie Fizică şi Sport	Chișinău, Moldova
1	GRAND PRIX FEA	December 18, 2009	Drive Club	Chișinău, Moldova

=== FEA MMA EVENTS ===
#	Event	Date	Venue	Location
19	EAGLES FC DANGER ZONE	November 13, 2021	FMF Futsal Arena	Ciorescu, Moldova
18	EAGLES RESET	March 13, 2021	FMF Futsal Arena	Ciorescu, Moldova
17	EAGLES NEXT LEVEL	February 15, 2020	FMF Futsal Arena	Ciorescu, Moldova
16	EAGLES ELIMINATION	October 26, 2019	Circul de Stat din Chișinău	Chișinău, Moldova
15	EAGLES ELIMINATION SUMMER EDITION	June 22, 2019	Circul de Stat din Chișinău	Chișinău, Moldova
14	EAGLES 11	February 16, 2019	Manej Sport Arena	Chișinău, Moldova
13	EAGLES 10. Elimination Tournament & Fighting Championship	November 1, 2018	Manej Sport Arena	Chișinău, Moldova
12	EAGLES 9	May 26, 2018	Manej Sport Arena	Chișinău, Moldova
11	EAGLES 8	February 10, 2018	Manej Sport Arena	Chișinău, Moldova
10	EAGLES 7 Elimination Tournament & Fighting Championship	November 4, 2017	Manej Sport Arena	Chișinău, Moldova
9	EAGLES 6. Russia VS Moldova	June 24, 2017	General Media Group	Chișinău, Moldova
8	EAGLES 5. Elimination Tournament & Fighting Championship	May 20, 2017	General Media Group	Chișinău, Moldova
7	EAGLES 4. Elimination Tournament & Fighting Championship	February 18, 2017	General Media Group	Chișinău, Moldova
6	EAGLES 3. Elimination Tournament & Fighting Championship	November 14, 2016	General Media Group	Chișinău, Moldova
5	EAGLES 2. Elimination Tournament & Fighting Championship	May 27, 2016	General Media Group	Chișinău, Moldova
4	EAGLES 1. Fighting Championship	February 27, 2016	General Media Group	Chișinău, Moldova
3	"FIGHTING EAGLES" EUROPE SERIES K-1 & MMA RULES	December 15, 2012	Manej Sport Arena	Chișinău, Moldova
2	FIGHTING EAGLES. EUROPE SERIES K-1 & MMA RULES	December 10, 2011	Manej Sport Arena	Chișinău, Moldova
1	FEA Bushido FC Moldova VS Europe	October 18, 2010	USEFS	Chișinău, Moldova

== Rankings ==
=== FEA K-1 Rankings ===
FEA K-1 Rankings

=== FEA MMA Rankings ===
FEA MMA Rankings (ex. EAGLES FC)

== Champions ==
=== FEA Championship K-1 rules current champions ===
Weight class	Upper weight limit	Champion	Event	Date	Title defenses
Heavyweight	Unlimited	(Russia) Kirill Kornilov def. Cristian Ristea	FEA Reset	March 13, 2021	
Light heavyweight	95 kg (209.4 lb)	(Croatia) Mladen Kujundžić def. Alexandru Burduja	FEA CHAMPIONSHIP FULL DRIVE	December 17, 2022	
Middleweight	85 kg (187.4 lb)	Vacant			
Welterweight	77 kg (169.8 lb)	(Moldova) Artiom Livadari def. Unal Alkayis	FEA Legacy	March 30, 2024	
Lightweight	71 kg (156.5 lb)	(Moldova) Vitalie Matei def. Calin Petrisor	FEA EQUINOX	September 23, 2023	
Featherweight	65 kg (143.3 lb)	(Moldova) Dmitrii Sirbu def. Adrian Maxim	FEA CHAMPIONSHIP TAKE OFF	April 8, 2023	
Bantamweight	60 kg (132.3 lb)	Vacant			
Women's strawweight	52 kg (114.6 lb)	(Turkey) Funda Akayis def. Hasmik Asatryan	FEA CHAMPIONSHIP FULL DRIVE	December 17, 2022	

=== FEA K-1 all champions ===
Weight Class	Champion	Runner-up	Event	Date	Location
Middleweight	(Moldova) Constantin Țuțu	(Moldova) Vadim Nani	FEA WORLD GRAND PRIX	December 18, 2009	Chișinău, Moldova
Middleweight	(Ukraine) Alexander Oleinik	(Moldova) Constantin Țuțu	2010 FEA KOK World Grand Prix Championship	December 11, 2010	Chișinău, Moldova
Middleweight	(Moldova) Constantin Țuțu	(Moldova) Alexandr Surkov	2011 FEA Middleweight Championship	April 16, 2011	Chișinău, Moldova
Lightweight	(Moldova) Cristian Dorel	(Slovakia) Egon Ratz	2011 FEA Lightweight Tournament	April 16, 2011	Chișinău, Moldova
Middleweight	(Moldova) Constantin Țuțu	(Poland) Stanisław Zaniewski	2011 FEA KOK World GP 2011 in Chișinău - Middleweight Tournament, Final	October 1, 2011	Chișinău, Moldova
Featherweight	(Ukraine) Maxim Fedorkov	(Russia) Maxim Isaev	2012 FEA Featherweight Tournament	March 30, 2012	Chișinău, Moldova
Lightweight	(Moldova) Cristian Dorel	(Poland) Mateusz Kopiec	2012 FEA Lightweight Tournament	September 29, 2012	Chișinău, Moldova
K-1 Light Heavyweight	(Moldova) Constantin Țuțu	(Netherlands) Leon Miedema	2013 K-1 World Grand Prix 2013 in Moldova - Light Heavyweight Tournament,	March 30, 2013	Chișinău, Moldova
Lightweight	(Germany) Denis Schneidmiller	(Moldova) Cristian Dorel	2013 FEA Lightweight Tournament	September 28, 2013	Chișinău, Moldova
Heavyweight	(Moldova) Stepan Cirlig	(Moldova) Pavel Voronin	2013 FEA Heavyweight Tournament	December 14, 2013	Chișinău, Moldova
Middleweight	(Moldova) Constantin Țuțu	(Ukraine) Igor Lyapin	2014 FEA KOK MIDDLEWEIGHT TOURNAMENT	March 22, 2014	Chișinău, Moldova
Featherweight	(Moldova) Maxim Railean	(Lithuania) Martinas Danius	2014 FEA Featherweight Tournament	September 19, 2014	Chișinău, Moldova
Middleweight	(Moldova) Constantin Țuțu	(Italy) Vittorio Iermano	2014 FEA TITLE FIGHT	September 19, 2014	Chișinău, Moldova
Heavyweight	(Germany) Vladimir Tok	(Moldova) Stepan Cirlig	2014 FEA KOK Heavyweight Tournament	December 20, 2014	Chișinău, Moldova
Middleweight	(Ukraine) Igor Lyapin	(Romania) Daniel Alexandru	2015 FEA KOK Middleweight Tournament	April 4, 2015	Chișinău, Moldova
Featherweight	(Moldova) Stanislav Renita	(Lithuania) Igor Osinin	2015 FEA KOK Featherweight Tournament	September 26, 2015	Chișinău, Moldova
Welterweight	(Moldova) Serghei Morari	(Latvia) Roman Zobin	2015 FEA KOK WGP Welterweight Tournament	December 19, 2015	Chișinău, Moldova
Welterweight	(Moldova) Constantin Țuțu	(Ukraine) Igor Lyapin	2015 FEA KOK TITLE FIGHT	December 19, 2015	Chișinău, Moldova
Featherweight	(Moldova) Stanislav Renita	(Lithuania) Martynas Danius	2016 FEA KOK TITLE FIGHT	April 9, 2016	Chișinău, Moldova
Light Heavyweight 95 kg	(Moldova) Alexandru Burduja	(Romania) Danut Hurduc	2016 FEA KOK Light Heavyweight WGP	October 1, 2016	Chișinău, Moldova
Middleweight	(Moldova) Aurel Ignat	(Poland) Stanislav Zaniewski	2016 FEA KOK Middleweight WGP	December 10, 2016	Chișinău, Moldova
Lightweight	(Moldova) Alexandru Prepelița	(Romania) Andrei Leuștean	2017 FEA KOK Lightweight WGP	April 1, 2017	Chișinău, Moldova
Light heavyweight 95 kg	(Czech Republic) Vasil Ducar	(Romania) Danut Hurduc	2017 FEA KOK Light heavyweight WGP	September 30, 2017	Chișinău, Moldova
Lightweight	(Moldova) Dorel Cristian	(Suriname) Shonzinyo Abena	2017 FEA KOK Lightweight Title Fight	December 9, 2017	Chișinău, Moldova
Featherweight	(Moldova) Dmitrii Sirbu	(Morocco) Issam Laazibi	2018 FEA Featherweight WGP	March 24, 2018	Chișinău, Moldova
Welterweight	(Moldova) Constantin Rusu	(Moldova) Dorel Cristian	2018 FEA KOK Welterweight Tournament GP	March 24, 2018	Chișinău, Moldova
Women's strawweight 52 kg	(Moldova) Nadejda Kantsyr	(Morocco) Esma Hasshass	2018 FEA KOKTitle Fight	March 24, 2018	Chișinău, Moldova
Lightweight	(Moldova) Vitalie Matei	(Romania) Andrei Leustean	2018 FEA World Series	October 6, 2018	Chișinău, Moldova
Heavyweight	(Ukraine) Roman Kryklia	(Ukraine) Tsotne Rogava	2018 FEA 26 World Series	October 6, 2018	Chișinău, Moldova
Featherweight	(Moldova) Stanislav Renita	(Moldova) Dmitrii Sirbu	2018 FEA 27 WGP	December 8, 2018	Chișinău, Moldova
FEA LIGHT HEAVYWEIGHT 95 kg	(Moldova) Alexandru Burduja	(Czech Republic) Mikhail Tiuterev	2018 FEA 27 WGP 4 Man Light Heavyweight Tournament	December 8, 2018	Chișinău, Moldova
Featherweight	(Moldova) Stanislav Renita	(Moldova) Dmitrii Sirbu	2018 FEA 27 WGP 4 Man Light Heavyweight Tournament	March 30, 2019	Chișinău, Moldova
Welterweight	(Moldova) Constantin Rusu	(Moldova) Dorel Cristian	2019 FEA 27 WGP 4 Man Light Heavyweight Tournament	December 8, 2018	Chișinău, Moldova
Interim heavyweight FEA TITLE FIGHT	(Ukraine) Pavel Zhuravlev	(Turkey) Mehmet Ozer	2019 FEA WGP Odessa KEEPGRINDING	August 24, 2019	Odesa, Ukraine
Lightweight	(Armenia) Zhora Akopyan	(Moldova) Constantin Rusu	2019 FEA WGP Odessa KEEPGRINDING 4 Man Lightweight Tournament	August 24, 2019	Odesa, Ukraine
Featherweight	(Moldova) Marin Vetrila	(Romania) Cristian Spetcu	2019 FEA WGP Chișinău 4 Man Featherweight	December 7, 2019	Chișinău, Moldova
Heavyweight	(Serbia) Mihajlo Kecojevic	(Albania) Asdren Gashi	2019 FEA WGP Chișinău 4 Man Featherweight	December 7, 2019	Chișinău, Moldova
Lightweight	(Moldova) Vitalie Matei	(Ukraine) Stanislav Kazantsev	2021 FEA KICKBOXING RESET WGP 4 Man Lightweight Tournament	March 13, 2021	Chișinău, Moldova
Heavyweight	(Russia) Kirill Kornilov	(Romania) Cristian Ristea	2021 FEA KICKBOXING RESET WORLD HEAVYWEIGHT CHAMPIONSHIP	March 13, 2021	Chișinău, Moldova
Women's strawweight	(Turkey) Funda Alkayis	(Armenia) Hasmik Asatryan	2022 FEA CHAMPIONSHIP FULL DRIVE	December 17, 2022	Chișinău, Moldova
Light Heavyweight	(Croatia) Mladen Kujundzic	(Moldova) Alexandru Burduja	2022 FEA CHAMPIONSHIP FULL DRIVE	December 17, 2022	Chișinău, Moldova
Featherweight	(Moldova) Dmitrii Sirbu	(Romania) Adrian Maxim	2023 FEA CHAMPIONSHIP TAKE OFF	April 8, 2023	Chișinău, Moldova
Lightweight	(Moldova) Vitalie Matei	(Moldova) Calin Petrisor	2023 FEA CHAMPIONSHIP EQUINOX	September 23, 2023	Chișinău, Moldova
Welterweight	(Moldova) Artiom Livadari	(Turkey) Unal Alkayis	2024 FEA LEGACY	March 30, 2024	Chișinău, Moldova

=== FEA MMA (ex. EAGLES FC) current champions ===
Weight class	Upper weight limit	Champion	Event	Date	Title defenses
Heavyweight	Unlimited	(Moldova) Alexandr Romanov def. Alexander Stolyarov	EAGLES 8	February 10, 2018	
Light heavyweight	93 kg (205.0 lb)	Vacant			
Middleweight	84 kg (185.2 lb)	(Russia) Arslan Eslemesov def. Egor Ivanov	EAGLES ELIMINATION SUMMER EDITION	June 22, 2019	
Welterweight	77 kg (169.8 lb)	(Moldova) Luca Poklit def. Sergiu Barbarosa	EAGLES 7	November 4, 2017	
Lightweight	71 kg (156.5 lb)	(Armenia) Martun Mezhlumyan def. Valeriu Mircea	EAGLES NEXT LEVEL	February 15, 2020	
Featherweight	66 kg (145.5 lb)	(Moldova) Valeriu Mircea def. Andrei Barbarosau	EAGLES 11	February 16, 2019	
Bantamweight	61 kg (134.5 lb)	(Moldova) Mihail Sirbu def. Bogdan Barbu	EAGLES NEXT LEVEL	February 15, 2020	
Flyweight	57 kg (125.7 lb)	(Azerbaijan) Mehman Mammadov def. Evgheniy Sibirskiy-Manko	EAGLES RESET	March 13, 2021	
Women's strawweight	52 kg (114.6 lb)	Vacant			

=== Champions of FEA MMA ===
Weight Class	Champion	Runner-up	Event	Date	Defences	Location
Lightweight	(Moldova) Grigore Panfilii	(Moldova) Andrei Barbarosa	EAGLES FC 3	November 19, 2016	November 3, 2018	Chișinău, Moldova
Welterweight	(Moldova) Vasile Botnaru	(Moldova) Sergiu Barbarosa	EAGLES IV	February 18, 2017		Chișinău, Moldova
Bantamweight	(Moldova) Mihail Sirbu	(Ukraine) Dmytro Predebaylo	EAGLES V	May 20, 2017	May 26, 2018	Chișinău, Moldova
Welterweight	(Moldova) Luca Poclit	(Moldova) Sergiu Barbarosa	EAGLES VII	November 4, 2017		Chișinău, Moldova
Interim Heavyweight	(Moldova) Alexandr Romanov	(Uzbekistan) Alexander Stolyarov	EAGLES VII	February 10, 2018		Chișinău, Moldova
Bantamweight	(Romania) Bogdan Barbu	(Moldova) Mihail Sirbu	EAGLES IX	May 26, 2018		Chișinău, Moldova
Interim Bantamweight	(Moldova) Denis Palancica	(Moldova) Gheorghe Lupu	EAGLES IX	May 26, 2018		Chișinău, Moldova
Lightweight	(Belarus) Ivan Zhvirblia	(Moldova) Grigore Panfilii	EAGLES 10	November 3, 2018		Chișinău, Moldova
Interim Bantamweight	(Ukraine) Dmytro Predebaylo	(Moldova) Gheorghe Lupu	EAGLES 10	November 3, 2018		Chișinău, Moldova
Featherweight	(Moldova) Valeriu Mircea	(Moldova) Andrei Barbarosa	EAGLES 11	February 16, 2019		Chișinău, Moldova
Interim Middleweight	(Russia) Arslan Eslemesov	(Ukraine) Egor Ivanov	EAGLES ELIMINATION	October 26, 2019		Chișinău, Moldova
Lightweight	(Armenia) Martun Mezhlumyan	(Moldova) Valeriu Mircea	EAGLES NEXT LEVEL	February 15, 2020		Chișinău, Moldova
Bantamweight	(Moldova) Mihail Sirbu	(Romania) Bogdan Barbu	EAGLES NEXT LEVEL	February 15, 2020		Chișinău, Moldova
Flyweight	(Azerbaijan) Mehman Mammadov	(Belarus) Evgheniy Sibirskiy - Manko	EAGLES RESET	March 13, 2021		Chișinău, Moldova
Interim Featherweight	(Moldova) Nicolae Hantea	(Turkey) Kadir Dalkiran	FEA CHAMPIONSHIP TAKE OFF	April 8, 2023		Chișinău, Moldova
