= FMF Futsal Arena =

Futsal arena in Moldova

- Arena de futsal a FMF
- Arena futsal Ciorescu
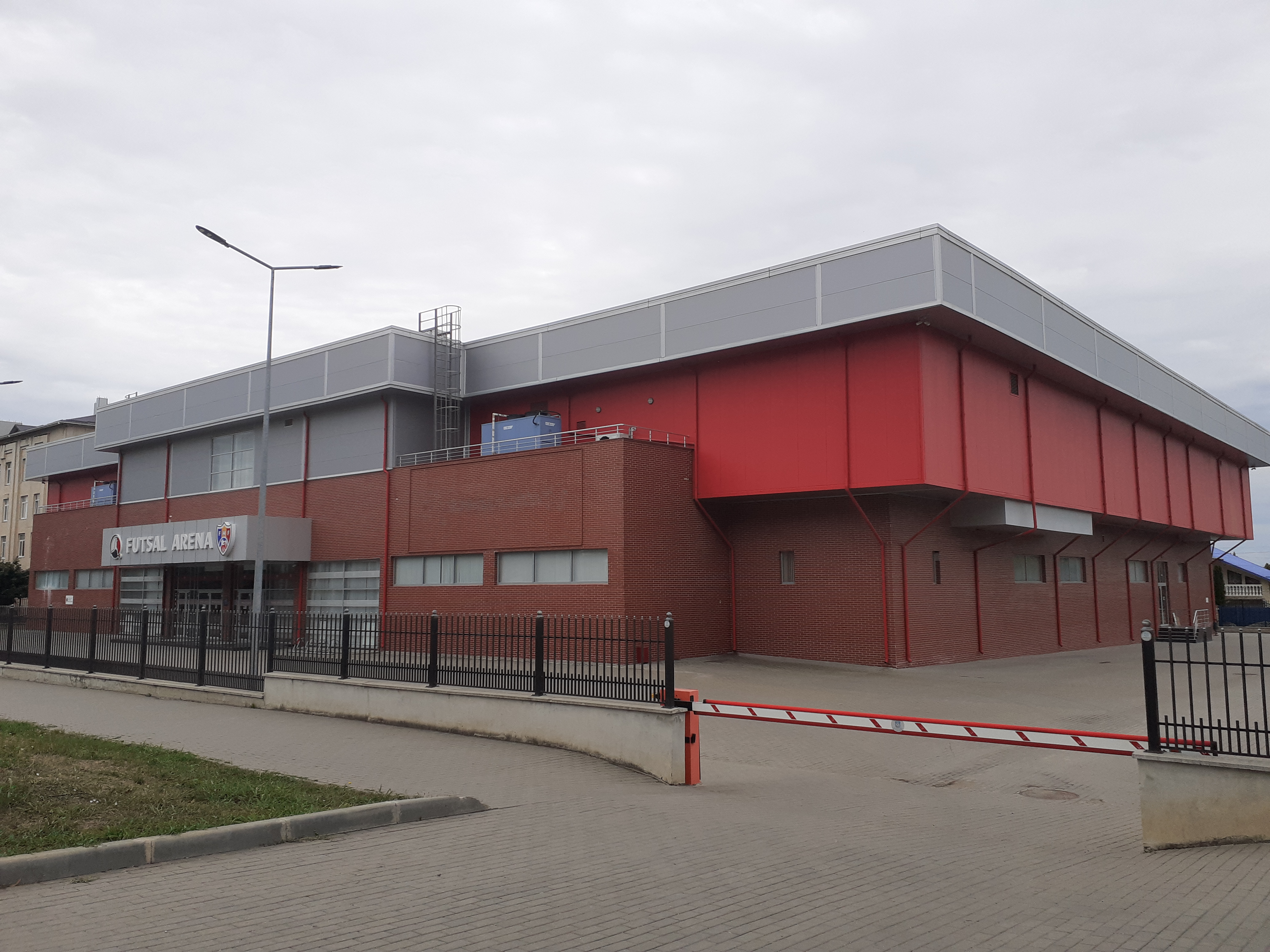
- The arena in 2023
- Interactive map of FMF Futsal Arena
- Address: 2A Alexandru cel Bun Street; Ciorescu; Moldova
- Coordinates: 47.127142532234444°N 28.89254676476485°E,
- Owner: Moldovan Football Federation
- Capacity: 1,401
- Scoreboard: Yes
- Field size: Game Field 20m x 40m, Open Game area 26,5m x 47,5m
- Field shape: Rectangular

Construction
- Built: February 2013
- Opened: 15 November 2014
- Architects: Denis Nedeoglo (EOS-STUDIO SRL, Moldova)
- Project managers: Denis Nedeoglo (EOS-STUDIO SRL, Moldova)
- Main contractors: Dialin-Exim SRL (EOS-STUDIO SRL, Moldova)

Tenant
- Moldova national futsal team (2014 – present)

The FMF Futsal Arena (Romanian: Arena de futsal a FMF) is an indoor futsal stadium in Ciorescu, Chișinău, Moldova. The stadium was inaugurated in November 2014. The Moldovan Football Federation (FMF), with the collaboration of UEFA are the responsible parties of the project.

== Construction ==
The construction project commenced in February 2013. In terms of financing, UEFA played a pivotal role by contributing a substantial portion of the construction costs, covering approximately 70% of the expenses, which amounted to roughly 4 million euros.

== Opening ==
The FMF Futsal Arena celebrated its formal inauguration on 15 November 2014. The symbolic ribbon was cut by UEFA Vice-President Marios Lefkaritis, Prime Minister Iurie Leancă, President of the Moldovan Football Federation Pavel Cebanu, and Mayor of the Ciorescu commune Ion Scripnic. The ceremony was also attended by the President of Moldova Nicolae Timofti, former Presidents Mircea Snegur and Petru Lucinschi, members of parliament, and the presidents of various football federations.

The first match at the Futsal Arena FMF complex was played on 22 November in the Moldovan Futsal Supercup, between the teams JLC and Tarsus.

== Facilities ==
The Futsal Arena FMF has a total area of 4,694.5 square meters and includes a multifunctional field measuring 47m x 26m, lighting installation, stands for spectators (1,302 seats), areas for journalists, photographers, and video operators, two electronic scoreboards, a sound system, four fully equipped locker rooms for teams (including two locker rooms for individuals with disabilities), two locker rooms for referees, rooms for the delegate and the referee observer, a video surveillance system, a medical point, catering services, a conference room, free Wi-Fi internet, and permanently monitored parking spaces.

== Usage ==
The Arena hosts most of the local futsal competitions. In 2024, it served as the venue for group stage of the Futsal Champions League.

It also hosts matches in Group 4 for the 2025 FIFA Futsal Women's World Cup qualification (UEFA).

Beyond futsal, the Arena accommodates events from other sports such as kickboxing and MMA, organized by the Fighting Entertainment Association. In 2016, it was the venue for the FIBA European Championship for Small Countries. Additionally, it has hosted competitions in taekwondo, K1, and more.

In 2022, after the Russian invasion of Ukraine, the Moldovan Football Federation utilized the Futsal Arena complex in Ciorescu to set up a refugee centre with 500 beds for displaced persons from Ukraine.
