= Islam Murtazaev =

Russian kickboxer (born 1991)

- Born: Ислам Муртазаев; April 13, 1991 (age 35); Dagestan ASSR, Russia SFSR, Soviet Union
- Height: 1.85 m (6 ft 1 in)
- Weight: 86 kg (190 lb; 13.5 st)
- Division: Lightweight (ONE); Welterweight; Middleweight
- Style: Muay Thai, Kickboxing
- Fighting out of: Pattaya, Thailand; Moscow, Russia
- Team: Venum Training Camp Thailand; Varyag Gym
- Trainer: Artyom Grigoriev; Mehdi Zatout

Kickboxing record
- Total: 30
- Wins: 23
- By knockout: 6
- Losses: 7
- By knockout: 0

Medal record

Men's Muay Thai

Representing Russia

IFMA World Championships
| Silver medal – second place | 2015 Bangkok | 75 kg |

WMF World Championships
| Gold medal – first place | 2016 Bangkok | 75 kg |

Islam Murtazaev (Russian: Ислам Муртазаев; born April 13, 1991) is a Russian kickboxer and mixed martial artist. As of March 2023, he is ranked as the fourth best middleweight in the world by Beyond Kickboxing.

== Biography and career ==
=== Early career ===
Murtazaev grew up in Dagestan where he trained in wrestling before transitioning to Muay Thai at the age of 10. He competed as an amateur until 2016 when he quit his job as an oil and gas extraction engineer and moved to Thailand.

On September 29, 2017, Murtazaev took part in the EM Legend -75 kg World Tournament finals. In the semi-finals he defeated Jordan Tai by decision. He faced Rungrawee Sitsongpeenong in the final, after 3 rounds the judges declared the fight a draw, an extra round was fought which Murtazaev won by split decision to capture the title.

On April 8, 2016, Murtazaev took part in the 2016 Kunlun Fight -75 kg World Tournament. He faced Alim Nabiev in the final 16 round and was eliminated after losing the fight by unanimous decision.

On November 30, 2018, Murtazaev faced Omar Moreno in a KOK World Series event in Spain. He won the fight with by tornado kick knockout in the first round.

Murtazaev faced Chanajon P.K. Saenchai Muaythaigym at THAI FIGHT Chiang Mai on December 23, 2017. He lost the fight by decision.

Murtazaev faced Omar Moreno in his King of Kings debut at KOK World Series on November 30, 2018. He won the fight by a first-round knockout.

Murtazaev was booked to face Sher Mamazulunov at Wu Lin Feng 2019: WLF China vs Russia on September 20, 2019, in an WLF-Orion cross-promotional event. Murtazaev won the fight by unanimous decision. The bout was later awarded "Fight of the Year" honors at the 2019 "The Orion Awards".

=== ONE Championship ===
Murtazaev challenged Regian Eersel for the ONE Lightweight World Championship at ONE: Winter Warriors on December 3, 2021. He lost the bout via split decision.

Murtazaev was expected to face the former Glory Welterweight Champion Nieky Holzken at ONE: X on March 26, 2022. The bout was later cancelled, as all Russian fighters were removed from ONE events taking place in Singapore.

Murtazaev was expected to face Sinsamut Klinmee at ONE 159 on July 22, 2022. Murtazaev later withdrew because of a "family emergency" and was replaced by Liam Nolan.

Murtazaev was expected to face the former Glory welterweight champion Nieky Holzken at ONE 162 on October 21, 2022. Holzken withdrew with an injury on October 17 and was replaced by Constantin Rusu. Murtazaev lost the fight by unanimous decision.

Murtazaev faced Ahmet Kılıç at REN TV Fight Club on November 18, 2022. He won the fight by a first-round knockout.

Murtazaev challenged Sergey Ponomarev for the Russian National -86 kg title at REN TV Fight Club on February 17, 2023. He won the fight by unanimous decision.

Murtazaev was expected to face Jonatan Oliveira for the vacant WKU K-1 World -86 kg title at the November 18, 2023, REN TV Fight Club event. Oliveira withdrew with a torn biceps on November 15 and was replaced by the undefeated Sina Kazemi. Murtazaev won the fight by a first-round knockout.

== Titles and accomplishments ==
=== Professional ===
- EM Legend
  - 2017 EM Legend World -75 kg Champion
- Russian Kickboxing Federation
  - 2023 Russian K-1 -86 kg Championship
- World Karate and Kickboxing Union
  - 2023 WKU K-1 World -86 kg Champion

=== Amateur ===
- International Federation of Muaythai Associations
  - 2015 IFMA World Championship -75 kg (silver)
- World Muaythai Federation
  - 2016 WMF World Championship Pro-Am -75 kg Champion

Awards

- 2019 Orion Awards Fight of the Year (vs. Sher Mamazulunov)

== Mixed martial arts record ==
Professional record breakdown
| 1 match | 1 win | 0 losses |
| By knockout | 1 | 0 |
| By submission | 0 | 0 |
| By decision | 0 | 0 |

| Res. | Record | Opponent | Method | Event | Date | Round | Time | Location | Notes |
|---|---|---|---|---|---|---|---|---|---|
| Win | 1–0 | Ali Rezaelian | TKO (submission to punches) | Mix Fight Events 46 | 27 March 2021 | 2 | N/A | Yerevan, Armenia | |

== Muay Thai & Kickboxing record ==
Professional record
23 Wins (6 (T)KOs), 7 Losses, 0 Draws
| Date | Result | Opponent | Event | Location | Method | Round | Time |
| 2023-11-18 | Win | (Iran) Sina Kazemi | REN TV Fight Club | Sochi, Russia | KO (Spinning back fist) | 1 | 3:00 |
Won the vacant WKU K-1 World -86 kg title.
| 2023-02-17 | Win | (Russia) Sergey Ponomarev | REN TV Fight Club | Minsk, Belarus | Decision (Unanimous) | 5 | 3:00 |
Won the Russian Kickboxing Federation K-1 -86 kg title.
| 2022-11-18 | Win | (Turkey) Ahmet Kılıç | REN TV Fight Club | Moscow, Russia | KO (Jumping knee) | 1 | 2:37 |
| 2022-10-21 | Loss | (Moldova) Constantin Rusu | ONE 162 | Kuala Lumpur, Malaysia | Decision (Unanimous) | 3 | 3:00 |
| 2021-12-03 | Loss | (Suriname) Regian Eersel | ONE: Winter Warriors | Kallang, Singapore | Decision (Split) | 5 | 3:00 |
For the ONE Kickboxing Lightweight Championship.
| 2019-09-20 | Win | (Uzbekistan) Sher Mamazulunov | Wu Lin Feng 2019: WLF China vs Russia | Moscow, Russia | Decision (Unanimous) | 3 | 3:00 |
| 2019-07-21 | Loss | (Thailand) Sinsamut Klinmee | Muaythai Night 5 | Moscow, Russia | Decision (Split) | 5 | 3:00 |
| 2018-11-30 | Win | (Spain) Omar Moreno | KOK World Series | Valencia, Spain | KO (Tornado Kick) | 1 | 1:35 |
| 2018-05-12 | Win | (Spain) Nicolas Mendes | Mix Fight 36 | Bilbao, Spain | KO (Spinning elbow) | 3 | 1:38 |
| 2017-12-23 | Loss | (Thailand) Chanajon P.K. Saenchai Muaythaigym | THAI FIGHT Chiang Mai | Chiang Mai, Thailand | Decision | 3 | 3:00 |
| 2017-12-02 | Win | (China) Tang Xiaofeng | EM Legend 26 | Emei, China | Decision (Unanimous) | 3 | 3:00 |
| 2017-10-28 | Win | (Ukraine) Oleg Shamsheev | Grand Prix Russia Open 150 | Moscow, Russia | Decision | 3 | 3:00 |
| 2017-09-29 | Win | (Thailand) Rungrawee KemMuaythaigym | EM Legend 23, Final | Yilong, China | Ext.R Decision (Split) | 4 | 3:00 |
Wins the EM Legend World -75kg Tournament.
| 2017-09-29 | Win | (New Zealand) Jordan Tai | EM Legend 23, Semi-final | Yilong, China | Decision | 3 | 3:00 |
| 2017-05-28 | Win | (Russia) Evgeny Vorontsov | Grand Prix Russia Open | Russia | Decision | 3 | 3:00 |
| 2016-12-23 | Win | (Iraq) Ali Qaradaghi | EM Legend 15 | Emei, China | Decision (Unanimous) | 3 | 3:00 |
| 2016-11-19 | Win | (Armenia) Yurik Davtyan | THAI FIGHT AIR RACE 1 | Rayong, Thailand | Decision | 3 | 3:00 |
| 2016-10-15 | Win | (Thailand) Sudsakorn Sor Klinmee | THAI FIGHT Chengdu | Chengdu, China | Decision | 3 | 3:00 |
| 2016-08- | Win | (China) | PFC K1 super fight | China | | | |
| 2016- | Win | (Thailand) | Super Muaythai | Thailand | KO (Spinning back fist) | | |
| 2016-04-08 | Loss | (Azerbaijan) Alim Nabiev | Kunlun Fight 41, 75 kg Tournament Final 16 | Xining, China | Decision (Unanimous) | 3 | 3:00 |
| 2016-03-13 | Win | (Thailand) Praipayak Sor.Sueaphet | Super Muay Thai | Thailand | KO (Spinning back fist) | 3 | |
| 2016-02-14 | Win | (Germany) Achim Schoepf | Super Muay Thai | Thailand | Decision | 3 | 3:00 |
| 2016-01-17 | Loss | (France) Hamza Ngoto | MAX Muay Thai | Pattaya, Thailand | Decision | 3 | 3:00 |
| 2013-08-31 | Loss | (Russia) Anatoly Moiseev | Oracul Fight Zone 2013 | Russia | Decision (Unanimous) | 3 | 3:00 |
Legend: Win Loss Draw/No contest Notes

Amateur record
| Date | Result | Opponent | Event | Location | Method | Round | Time |
|---|---|---|---|---|---|---|---|
| 2016-03-21 | Win | (France) Marc Sauterg | 2016 WMF World Championship, Final | Bangkok, Thailand | Decision | 3 | 3:00 |
Wins 2016 WMF World Championships -75kg title.
| 2016-03-20 | Win | (Brazil) Bernardo Carvalho | 2016 WMF World Championship, Semi-final | Bangkok, Thailand | KO | | |
| 2015-08-23 | Loss | (France) Hamza Ngoto | 2015 IFMA World Championship, Final | Bangkok, Thailand | Decision | 3 | 3:00 |
Wins 2015 IFMA World Championships -75kg Silver Medal.
| 2015-08- | Win | (Sweden) Burim Rama | 2015 IFMA World Championship, Semi-final | Bangkok, Thailand | Decision | 3 | 3:00 |
| 2015-08- | Win | (Canada) Derek Jolivette | 2015 IFMA World Championship, Quarter-final | Bangkok, Thailand | TKO | 1 | |
| 2015-08- | Win | (Uzbekistan) Mausuzbek | 2015 IFMA World Championship, Round of 16 | Bangkok, Thailand | Decision | 3 | 3:00 |
| 2015-03-16 | Loss | (Russia) Nikolai Vasilenko | 2015 Russian Cup | Russia | Decision | 3 | 3:00 |
Legend: Win Loss Draw/No contest Notes

== See also ==
- List of male kickboxers
