= King of Kings (kickboxing) =

European kickboxing promotion

- Type: Private
- Industry: Kickboxing promotion
- Founded: 2009
- Founder: Donatas Simanaitis
- Headquarters: Vilnius, Lithuania
- Key people: Donatas Simanaitis (President, Owner, Founder)
- Owner: International Bushido Federation (IBF)
- Website: www.kokfights.com

King of Kings, or KOK, is a European kickboxing promotion founded in 2009. The company has its headquarters in Vilnius, Lithuania.

== History ==
The promotion held its first event in Lithuania in 2009. The promotion has since held over 100 events in multiple countries including in Latvia, Lithuania, Moldova, Poland, Estonia, Russia, Germany and Cyprus. The promotion held its first event in Estonia in 2015. First event in Finland was held in 2019. In the past King of Kings also co-promoted events with K-1. Events in Moldova were promoted with FEA.

=== Name ===
Similarly to K-1, the K's in the KOK name stand for Kickboxing, K-1, Karate, Kung-Fu, and other stand-up fight sports and martial arts. They also stand for “King” so “King of Kings” is meant as the best in the world.

=== Media coverage ===
KOK is broadcast on FightBox, DAZN, TV3 Sport, Prime Fight, Eleven Sports and Fight Network.

In January 2022, a distribution partnership through United Fight Alliance on U.S. networks was announced.

A 3-year global broadcast deal with DAZN was announced 30 September 2022. (Note: Excluding in Estonia, Latvia and Lithuania.)

KOK was previously broadcast across Europe on Eurosport in 2014 and 2015. Other past broadcasters include BTV, Canal 3, Lietuvos rytas TV and TV6.

== Rules ==
Fights in KOK are fought mostly under Kickboxing rules, but events also include fights under MMA and Boxing rules.

== Events ==
#	Event	Date	Venue	Location
146	KOK Fight Night in Slovakia	November 28, 2026	Gopass Arena Liptov	Liptovský Mikuláš, Slovakia
145	KOK 130 World Series in Freiburg	November 21, 2026	Sick-Arena	Freiburg, Germany
144	KOK 129 World Series in Riga	October 17, 2026	Xiaomi Arena	Riga, Latvia
143	KOK Fight Night in Cyprus	June 20, 2026	The Warehouse by IT Quarter	Limasol, Cyprus
142	KOK 128 World Series in Riga	February 21, 2026	Xiaomi Arena	Riga, Latvia
141	KOK Fight Night in Slovakia	November 8, 2025	Gopass Arena Liptov	Liptovský Mikuláš, Slovakia
140	KOK 127 World Series in Riga	October 11, 2025	Xiaomi Arena	Riga, Latvia
139	KOK Fight Night in Cyprus	June 28, 2025	Agios Dometios Sports Center	Nikosia, Cyprus
138	KOK Fight Night in Aarhus	May 24, 2025	TST Aktiv Center	Aarhus, Denmark
137	KOK Fight Night in Switzerland	May 10, 2025	Waldmannhalle	Baar, Switzerland
136	KOK Fight Night in Riga	May 3, 2025	Atta Centre	Riga, Latvia
135	KOK Fight Night in Athens	April 12, 2025	Zofria Stadium	Athens, Greece
134	KOK 126 World Series in Vilnius	March 22, 2025	Twinsbet Arena	Vilnius, Lithuania
133	KOK 125 World Series in Riga	February 8, 2025	Arena Riga	Riga, Latvia
132	KOK Elimination Series 2023 in India II	December 21, 2024	CFA Ground	Kolkata, India
131	KOK in Vilnius	November 16, 2024	Avia Solutions Group Arena	Vilnius, Lithuania
130	KOK 123 in Slovakia	October 26, 2024	Liptov Arena Tatralandia	Liptovský Mikuláš, Slovakia
129	KOK 122 World Series in Riga	October 19, 2024	Arena Riga	Riga, Latvia
128	KOK Fight Series in Hamburg	August 25, 2024	Große Freiheit 36	Hamburg, Germany
127	KOK Fight Series in Nicosia	July 20, 2024	Dali Amphitheater	Nicosia, Cyprus
126	KOK 121 World Series in Germany	June 29, 2024	Estrel Congress Center	Berlin, Germany
125	KOK Fight Series in Athens	April 20, 2024	Zofria Indoor Hall	Athens, Greece
124	KOK 120 Mega Series in Vilnius	March 16, 2024	Avia Solutions Group Arena	Vilnius, Lithuania
123	KOK 119 World Series in Riga	February 17, 2024	Atta Centre	Riga, Latvia
122	KOK Elimination Series 2023 in India	December 17, 2023	PL Roy Indoor Stadium	Kolkata, India
121	KOK 118 World Series in Berlin	December 15, 2023	Verti Music Hall	Berlin, Germany
120	KOK 117 Mega Series in Vilnius	November 18, 2023	Avia Solutions Group Arena	Vilnius, Lithuania
119	KOK 116 World Series in Slovakia	October 28, 2023	Gopass Arena	Liptovský Mikuláš, Slovakia
118	KOK 115 Mega Series in Tallinn	October 14, 2023	Tondiraba Ice Hall	Tallinn, Estonia
117	KOK Elimination Series 2023 in Middenbeemster II	October 7, 2023	Sportcentrum De Kloek	Middenbeemster, Netherlands
116	KOK 113 World Series in Cyprus	July 15, 2023	Dali Amphitheater	Nicosia, Cyprus
115	KOK 112 World Series in Germany	June 24, 2023	Arena Ludwigsburg	Ludwigsburg, Germany
114	KOK Elimination Series 2023 in Middenbeemster	June 24, 2023	Sportcentrum De Kloek	Middenbeemster, Netherlands
113	KOK 111 Mega Series in Riga	April 1, 2023	Atta Centre	Riga, Latvia
112	KOK 110 Mega Series in Vilnius	March 18, 2023	Jeep Arena	Vilnius, Lithuania
111	KOK 109 World Series in Vienna	February 18, 2023	Eventhotel Pyramide	Vienna, Austria
110	KOK 108 Mega Series in Kaunas	December 22, 2022	Žalgiris Arena	Kaunas, Lithuania
109	KOK 107 World Series in Istanbul	December 9, 2022	Ülker Sports Arena	Istanbul, Turkey
108	KOK 106 World Series in Krefeld	December 4, 2022	Visaal	Krefeld, Germany
107	KOK 105 Mega Series in Riga	November 26, 2022	Atta Centre	Riga, Latvia
106	KOK 104 Mega Series in Kaunas	November 5, 2022	Žalgiris Arena	Kaunas, Lithuania
105	KOK 103 World Series in Tallinn	October 15, 2022	Tondiraba Ice Hall	Tallinn, Estonia
104	KOK 102 World Series in Nicosia	July 2, 2022	Skali Aglantzias Amphitheatre	Nicosia, Cyprus
102	KOK 101 World Series in Liptovský Mikuláš	June 4, 2022	Liptov Arena Tatralandia	Liptovský Mikuláš, Slovakia
101	KOK 100 World Series in Tallinn	May 7, 2022	Tondiraba Ice Hall	Tallinn, Estonia
100	KOK 99 World GP in Vilnius	March 19, 2022	Avia Solutions Group Arena	Vilnius, Lithuania
99	KOK 98 World Series in Riga	February 26, 2022	Atta Centre	Riga, Latvia
98	KOK 97 World Series in Istanbul	January 28, 2022	Ülker Sports Arena	Istanbul, Turkey
97	KOK 96 World Championship in Vilnius	November 20, 2021	Avia Solutions Group Arena	Vilnius, Lithuania
96	KOK Elimination Series 2021 in Grodno	October 23, 2021	Club Baza	Grodno, Belarus
95	KOK 94 World Championship in Tallinn	October 16, 2021	Tondiraba Ice Hall	Tallinn, Estonia
94	KOK World Series in Vilnius	October 2, 2021	Avia Solutions Group Arena	Vilnius, Lithuania
93	KOK 92 World Series in Latvia	September 18, 2021	Atta Centre	Riga, Latvia
92	KOK 91 Fight Series in Turkey	July 17, 2021	Sheraton Hotel Arena	Adana, Turkey
91	KOK 90 Fight Series in Turkey	June 29, 2021	Dedeman Hotel Arena	Konya, Turkey
90	KOK 89 World Series in Tallinn	June 6, 2021	CINAMON T1 Movie Theatre	Tallinn, Estonia
89	KOK 88 World Series in Warsaw	May 21, 2021	Centrum Sportu Wilanów	Warsaw, Poland
88	KOK Classic 6	April 24, 2021	Alytaus sporto rūmai	Alytus, Lithuania
87	KOK Classic 5	February 28, 2021	Alytaus sporto rūmai	Alytus, Lithuania
86	KOK Classic 4	December 12, 2020		Vilnius, Lithuania
85	KOK 86 World Series 2020 in Sarajevo	October 31, 2020	Hotel Hills	Sarajevo, Bosnia and Herzegovina
84	KOK Fight Series 2020 in Kazakhstan	October 25, 2020	Club GOGOL	Almaty, Kazakhstan
83	KOK 85 World Series 2020 in Tallinn	October 10, 2020	Tondiraba Ice Hall	Tallinn, Estonia
82	KOK Classic 3	September 26, 2020	Siemens Arena	Vilnius, Lithuania
81	KOK Summer Special Edition	August 2, 2020	Event Oasis	Kaunas, Lithuania
80	KOK Classic 2020 in Lithuania	June 27, 2020	Vilkanastru Dvaras Hotel	Vilkanastrai, Lithuania
79	KOK 83 World Series 2020 in Helsinki	February 29, 2020	House of Culture	Helsinki, Finland
78	KOK'82 Fight Series 2019 in Germany	November 30, 2019	Yayala Arena	Krefeld, Germany
77	KOK'81 World GP 2019 in Latvia	November 24, 2019	Arena Riga	Riga, Latvia
76	KOK'80 World Series 2019 in Lithuania	November 16, 2019	Siemens Arena	Vilnius, Lithuania
75	KOK'79 Fight Series 2019 in Slovakia	November 9, 2019	Liptov Arena	Liptovský Mikuláš, Slovakia
74	KOK'78 World Series 2019 in Kaunas	September 21, 2019	Žalgiris Arena	Kaunas, Lithuania
73	KOK'77 Fight Series 2019 in Turkey	August 16, 2019	Hendek Bayraktepe Arena	Sakarya, Turkey
72	KOK'76 World GP 2019 in Turkey	July 26, 2019	Hendek Bayraktepe Arena	Sakarya, Turkey
71	KOK'75 Fight Series 2019 in Bosnia and Herzegovina	July 3, 2019	Hotel Hills	Sarajevo, Bosnia and Herzegovina
70	KOK'74 Fight Series 2019 in Turkey	June 28, 2019	Hendek Bayraktepe Arena	Sakarya, Turkey
69	KOK'73 World GP 2019 in Cyprus	June 14, 2019	Amphitheater Skali Aglantzias	Nicosia, Cyprus
68	KOK'72 Fight Series 2019 in London	May 31, 2019	York Hall	London, United Kingdom
67	KOK'71 Fight Series 2019 in Helsinki	May 17, 2019	House of Culture	Helsinki, Finland
66	KOK'69 World Series 2019 in Vilnius	March 16, 2019	Siemens Arena	Vilnius, Lithuania
65	KOK Fight Series in Sakarya	March 2, 2019	Hendek Bayraktepe Arena	Sakarya, Turkey
64	KOK World Fighting championship 2018 in Turkey	December 8, 2018	Gonen Hotel	Istanbul, Turkey
63	KOK World Series in Spain	November 30, 2018	Pavilion of Ausias	Valencia, Spain
62	KOK World GP 2018 in Vilnius	November 17, 2018	Siemens Arena	Vilnius, Lithuania
61	KOK Fight Series 2018 in Riga	October 27, 2018	Arena Riga	Riga, Latvia
60	KOK World GP 2018 in Tallinn	October 13, 2018	Tondiraba Ice Hall	Tallinn, Estonia
59	KOK 61 World GP 2018 in Slovakia	September 29, 2018	Liptov Arena Tatralandia	Liptovský Mikuláš, Slovakia
58	KOK 60 World GP 2018 in Kaunas	September 21, 2018	Žalgiris Arena	Kaunas, Lithuania
57	KOK 59 World GP 2018 in Turkey	August 11, 2018	Cumhuriyet Square	Şarköy, Turkey
56	KOK 58 World GP 2018 in London	July 7, 2018	York Hall	London, United Kingdom
55	KOK 57 World Series 2018 in Cyprus	June 23, 2018	Eleftheria Indoor Hall	Nicosia, Cyprus
54	KOK 56 World GP 2018 in Moldova	March 24, 2018	Manej Sport Arena	Chișinău, Moldova
53	KOK 55 World GP 2018 in Vilnius	March 17, 2018	Siemens Arena	Vilnius, Lithuania
52	KOK 54 World GP 2018 in Riga	February 24, 2018	Arena Riga	Riga, Latvia
51	KOK 53 World GP 2017 in Moldova	December 9, 2017	Manej Sport Arena	Chișinău, Moldova
50	KOK 52 World GP 2017 in Riga	December 2, 2017	Arena Riga	Riga, Latvia
49	KOK 51 World GP 2017 in Vilnius	November 18, 2017	Siemens Arena	Vilnius, Lithuania
48	KOK 50 World GP 2017 in Riga	October 28, 2017	Arena Riga	Riga, Latvia
47	KOK 49 World GP 2017 in Tallinn	October 14, 2017	Saku Suurhall	Tallinn, Estonia
46	KOK 48 World GP 2017 In Moldova	September 30, 2017	Manej Sport Arena	Chișinău, Moldova
45	KOK World Series 2017 in Kaunas	September 23, 2017	Žalgiris Arena	Kaunas, Lithuania
44	KOK World Series - Special Summer Edition	June 16, 2017	Švyturys Arena	Klaipėda, Lithuania
43	KOK 46 World GP 2017 In Moldova	April 1, 2017	Manej Sport Arena	Chișinău, Moldova
42	KOK 45 World GP 2017 In Vilnius	March 18, 2017	Siemens Arena	Vilnius, Lithuania
41	KOK 44 World GP 2017 In Riga	February 25, 2017	Arena Riga	Riga, Latvia
40	KOK 43 World Championship 2017 In Nicosia	January 28, 2017	Eleftheria Indoor Hall	Nicosia, Cyprus
39	KOK 42 World GP 2016 In Moldova	December 10, 2016	Manej Sport Arena	Chișinău, Moldova
38	KOK 41 World GP 2016 In Vilnius	November 19, 2016	Siemens Arena	Vilnius, Lithuania
37	KOK 40 World GP 2016 In Riga	November 5, 2016	Arena Riga	Riga, Latvia
36	KOK 39 World GP 2016 in Moldova	October 1, 2016	Manej Sport Arena	Chișinău, Moldova
35	KOK 38 World GP 2016 in Tallinn	September 17, 2016	Saku Suurhall	Tallinn, Estonia
34	KOK 37 World GP 2016 In Moldova	April 9, 2016	Manej Sport Arena	Chișinău, Moldova
33	KOK World Series 2016 in Vilnius	March 19, 2016	Siemens Arena	Vilnius, Lithuania
32	KOK World GP 2016 In Riga	February 27, 2016	Arena Riga	Riga, Latvia
31	KOK World GP 2015 In Moldova	December 19, 2015	Manej Sport Arena	Chișinău, Moldova
30	KOK World Series 2015 in Vilnius	November 14, 2015	Siemens Arena	Vilnius, Lithuania
29	KOK World GP 2015 in Tallinn	October 17, 2015	Saku Suurhall	Tallinn, Estonia
28	KOK World GP 2015 In Moldova Vol. 29	September 26, 2015	Manej Sport Arena	Chișinău, Moldova
	KOK Elimination Series 2015 in Dublin	September 12, 2015	National Stadium	(Republic of Ireland) Dublin, Ireland
27	KOK World GP 2015 In Riga	May 22, 2015	Arena Riga	Riga, Latvia
26	KOK Hero's Series 2015 in Alytus	April 18, 2015	Alytus Arena	Alytus, Lithuania
25	KOK World GP 2015 in Moldova Vol. 27	April 4, 2015	Manej Sport Arena	Chișinău, Moldova
24	KOK World GP 2015 In Vilnius	March 14, 2015	Siemens Arena	Vilnius, Lithuania
23	KOK World GP 2014 In Chisinau Vol. 25	December 20, 2014	Manej Sport Arena	Chișinău, Moldova
22	KOK World Series 2014 In Cyprus	December 7, 2014	Pavilion Hall	Nicosia, Cyprus
21	KOK World GP 2014 In Plock Vol. 23	November 28, 2014	Orlen Arena	Płock, Poland
20	KOK Hero's Series 2014	November 15, 2014	Siemens Arena	Vilnius, Lithuania
19	KOK World GP 2014 In Gdańsk Vol. 22	October 17, 2014	Ergo Arena	Gdańsk, Poland
18	KOK World GP 2014 In Chisinau Vol. 21	September 19, 2014	Manej Sport Arena	Chișinău, Moldova
17	KOK World GP 2014 In Chisinau	March 22, 2014	Manej Sport Arena	Chișinău, Moldova
16	KOK World GP 2014 in Vilnius	March 15, 2014	Siemens Arena	Vilnius, Lithuania
15	KOK World Series 2013 in Chisinau	December 14, 2013	Manej Sport Arena	Chișinău, Moldova
14	KOK Elimination GP	November 23, 2013	Messehalle 2	Magdeburg, Germany
13	KOK World GP 2013 in Vilnius	November 16, 2013	Siemens Arena	Vilnius, Lithuania
12	KOK World GP 2013 in Chisinau Vol. 11	September 28, 2013	Manej Sport Arena	Chișinău, Moldova
11	KOK World GP 2012 in Baku	December 20, 2012	Avtovağzal Kompleksi	Baku, Azerbaijan
10	KOK World GP 2012 in Moldova Vol. 8	September 28, 2012	Manej Sport Arena	Chișinău, Moldova
9	KOK Europe GP 2012 in Chisinau Vol. 7	March 30, 2012	Manej Sport Arena	Chișinău, Moldova
8	KOK Europe GP 2011 in Chisinau Vol. 5	October 1, 2011	Manej Sport Arena	Chișinău, Moldova
7	KOK Europe GP 2011 in Lublin	June 10, 2011	Hala Globus	Lublin, Poland
6	KOK Europe GP 2011 in Chisinau Vol. 4	April 16, 2011	Manej Sport Arena	Chișinău, Moldova
5	KOK Europe GP 2011 in Vilnius	March 19, 2011	Siemens Arena	Vilnius, Lithuania
4	KOK World GP in Dnipropetrovsk	December 17, 2010	Sport Complex Meteor	Dnipro, Ukraine
3	KOK World GP in Russia	December 16, 2010	Odintsovo Sports Complex	Odintsovo, Russia
2	KOK World GP 2010 in Chisinau	December 11, 2010	Universitatea de Stat de Educaţie Fizică şi Sport	Chișinău, Moldova
1	KOK World GP 2010 in Warsaw	November 25, 2010	Hala Torwar	Warsaw, Poland

== Champions ==
=== Current champions ===
Weight class	Upper weight limit	Champion	Event	Date	Title defenses
Heavyweight	Unlimited	(Poland) Michał Turyński def. Reinis Porozovs	KOK World Series 87 in Warsaw	May 22, 2021	
Light heavyweight	95 kg (209.4 lb)	Vacant			
Middleweight	85 kg (187.4 lb)	Vacant			
Welterweight	77 kg (169.8 lb)	(Latvia) Zaurs Džavadovs; Hendrik Themas	KOK 125 World Series in Riga	February 9, 2025	
Lightweight	70 kg (154.3 lb)	(Finland) Niko Korventaus def. Gustas Dimsa	KOK 110 Mega Series in Vilnius	March 18, 2023	
Featherweight	65 kg (143.3 lb)	Vacant			
Bantamweight	60 kg (132.3 lb)	Vacant			
Women's Bantamweight	60 kg (132.3 lb)	(Estonia) Astrid Johanna Grents def. Ludovica Ciarpaglini	KOK 94 World Championship in Tallinn	October 15, 2022	1. def. Ilona Wojda at KOK 103 World Series in Tallinn October 15, 2022 in Tallinn, Estonia

=== KOK Heavyweight Championship ===
Weight limit: Unlimited

No.	Name	Event	Date	Defenses
Current	(Poland) Michał Turyński def. Reinis Porozovs	KOK World Series 87 in Warsaw; Warsaw, Poland	May 22, 2021	
Interim	(Slovakia) Martin Pacas def. Michał Turyński	KOK'79 Fight Series 2019 in Slovakia; Liptovsky Mikulas, Slovakia	November 9, 2019	
European Champion	(Bosnia and Herzegovina) Dževad Poturak def. Dritan Barjamaj	KOK 75 World Series 2019 in Sarajevo; Sarajevo, Bosnia and Herzegovina	July 3, 2019	
2	(Lithuania) Julius Mocka def. Vladimir Toktasynov	KOK 41 World GP 2016 In Vilnius; Vilnius, Lithuania	November 19, 2016	
1	(Germany) Vladimir Toktasynov def. Colin George	KOK World GP 2015 in Moldova Vol. 27; Chișinău, Moldova	April 4, 2015	

=== KOK Light Heavyweight Championship ===
Weight limit: 95 kg (209.4 lb)

No.	Name	Event	Date	Defenses
Current	Vacant			
The European title was later vacated.
European Champion	(Latvia) Kristaps Zile def. Michal Walczak	KOK 105 Mega Series in Riga; Riga, Latvia	November 26, 2022	
The European title was later vacated.
European Champion	(Azerbaijan) Zabit Samedov def. Freddy Kemayo	Zhara Fight Show; Moscow, Russia	May 30, 2018	
The title was later vacated.
1	(Lithuania) Sergej Maslobojev def. Robert Dorin	KOK World Series 2015 in Vilnius; Vilnius, Lithuania	November 14, 2015	

=== KOK Middleweight Championship ===
Weight limit: 85 kg (187.4 lb)

No.	Name	Event	Date	Defenses
Current	Vacant			
Interim	(Greece) Savvas Kagkelidis def. Jordan Djoumessi	KOK Fight Night in Athens; Athens, Greece	April 12, 2025	
The title was later vacated.
2	(Finland) Daniel Forsberg def. Raimonds Aukštikalnis	KOK'71 Fight Series 2019 in Helsinki; Helsinki, Finland	May 17, 2019	1. def. Jurivs Orlovs at KOK'81 World GP 2019 in Latvia on November 24, 2019 in Riga, Latvia
Interim	(Estonia) Maxim Vorovski def. Andreas Iversen	KOK World Series 89 in Tallinn; Tallinn, Estonia	June 6, 2021	
1	(Moldova) Constantin Țuțu def. Igor Lyapin	KOK World GP 2015 In Moldova; Chișinău, Moldova	December 20, 2015	

=== KOK Welterweight Championship ===
Weight limit: 77 kg (169.8 lb)

No.	Name	Event	Date	Defenses
Current	(Latvia) Zaurs Džavadovs def. Hendrik Themas	KOK 125 World Series in Riga; Riga, Latvia	February 8, 2025	
Interim	(Latvia) Zaurs Džavadovs def. Rodrigo Ferreira	KOK 122 World Series in Riga; Riga, Latvia	October 19, 2024	
4	(Netherlands) Chico Kwasi def. Henrikas Viksraitis	KOK World Championship 96 in Vilnius; Vilnius, Lithuania	November 20, 2021	
Interim	(Netherlands) Chico Kwasi def. Hendrik Themas	KOK World Championship 94 in Tallinn; Tallinn, Estonia	October 16, 2020	
KOK announced at KOK'82 Fight Series 2019 in Germany that Rusu was stripped of the title due to inactivity.
3	(Moldova) Constantin Rusu def. Aleksejs Marizihins	KOK Fight Series 2018 in Riga; Riga, Latvia	October 27, 2018	
2	(Latvia) Zaurs Džavadovs def. Serghei Morari	KOK 50 World GP 2017 in Riga; Riga, Latvia	October 28, 2017	
1	(Moldova) Serghei Morari def. Roman Zõbin	KOK 38 World GP 2016 in Tallinn; Tallinn, Estonia	September 17, 2016	

=== KOK Lightweight Championship ===
Weight limit: 70 kg (154.3 lb)

No.	Name	Event	Date	Defenses
Current	(Finland) Niko Korventaus def. Gustas Dimsa	KOK 110 Mega Series in Vilnius; Vilnius, Lithuania	March 18, 2023	
Mindaugas Narauskas was stripped of his title on 8 February 2023.
4	(Lithuania) Mindaugas Narauskas def. Mareks Pelcis	KOK World Championship 96 in Vilnius; Vilnius, Lithuania	November 20, 2021	
Interim	(Iran) Masoud Minaei def. Elkhan Aliyev	KOK World Series 97 in Istanbul; Istanbul, Turkey	January 28, 2022	
3	(Lithuania) Henrikas Vikšraitis def. Vitalie Matei	KOK'69 World Series 2019 in Vilnius; Vilnius, Lithuania	March 16, 2019	
2	(Moldova) Dorel Cristian def. Shonzinyo Abena	KOK 53 World GP 2017 in Moldova; Chișinău, Moldova	December 9, 2017	
1	(Ukraine) Artur Kyshenko def. Denis Makouski	K-1 World Grand Prix 2013 in Vilnius; Vilnius, Lithuania	April 27, 2013	

=== KOK Featherweight Championship ===
Weight limit: 65 kg (143.3 lb)

No.	Name	Event	Date	Defenses
Current	Vacant			
Matas Pultaražinskas was stripped of his title on 8 February 2023.
3	(Lithuania) Matas Pultaražinskas def. Oleg Moshin	KOK 99 World GP in Vilnius; Vilnius, Lithuania	March 19, 2022	1. def. Simon Santana at KOK 104 Mega Series in Kaunas November 6, 2022 in Riga, Latvia
Pok Biil was scheduled to defend his title at KOK 99 World GP in Vilnius, but couldn't fight and was stripped of his title.
2	(Finland) Pok Biil def. Igor Osinin	KOK 83 World Series 2020 in Helsinki; Helsinki, Finland	February 29, 2020	
Interim	(Lithuania) Matas Pultaražinskas def. Lukasz Öeczucki	KOK Classic 4 Vilnius, Lithuania	December 12, 2020	
1	(Moldova) Stanislav Reniţă def. Markko Moisar	KOK 49 World GP 2017 in Tallinn; Tallinn, Estonia	October 14, 2017	

=== KOK Bantamweight Championship ===
Weight limit: 60 kg (132.3 lb)

No.	Name	Event	Date	Defenses
Current	Vacant			
European Champion	(Estonia) Markko Moisar def. Simon Santana	KOK 100 World Series in Tallinn; Tallinn, Estonia	May 7, 2022	

=== KOK Flyweight Championship ===
Weight limit: 57 kg (125.7 lb)

No.	Name	Event	Date	Defenses
Current	Vacant			
Interim	(Cyprus) Ismail Al Kadhi def. Manolis Kalistis	KOK 102 World Series in Nikosia; Nikosia, Cyprus	July 2, 2022	

=== KOK Women's Bantamweight Championship ===
Weight limit: 60 kg (132.3 lb)

No.	Name	Event	Date	Defenses
Current	(Estonia) Astrid Johanna Grents def. Ludovica Ciarpaglini	KOK 94 World Championship in Tallinn; Tallinn, Estonia	October 16, 2021	
European Champion	(Estonia) Astrid Johanna Grents def. Miina Sirkeoja	KOK 100 World Series in Tallinn; Tallinn, Estonia	May 7, 2022	

=== KOK Women's Strawweight Championship ===
Weight limit: 51 kg (112.4 lb)

No.	Name	Event	Date	Defenses
The title was later vacated.
1	(Moldova) Nadejda Cantir def. Esma Hasshass	KOK 56 World GP 2018 in Moldova; Chișinău, Moldova	March 24, 2018	

== Notable fighters ==
- (Ukraine) Artur Kyshenko
- (Moldova) Constantin Țuțu
- (Finland) Daniel Forsberg
- (Ukraine) Pavel Zhuravlev
- (Lithuania) Sergej Maslobojev
- (Slovakia) Ivan Bartek
- (Lithuania) Remigijus Morkevicius
- (Azerbaijan) Zabit Samedov
- (Bosnia and Herzegovina) Dževad Poturak

== See also ==
- Lithuania Bushido Federation
