= ONE 162 =

Combat sport events in 2022

ONE 162: Zhang vs. Di Bella
- The poster for ONE 162: Zhang vs. Di Bella
- Promotion: ONE Championship
- Date: October 21, 2022
- Venue: Axiata Arena
- City: Kuala Lumpur, Malaysia

Event chronology
ONE on Prime Video 2: Xiong vs. Lee 3	ONE 162: Zhang vs. Di Bella	ONE on Prime Video 3: Lineker vs. Andrade

ONE 162: Zhang vs. Di Bella was a combat sport event produced by ONE Championship that took place on October 21, 2022 at the Axiata Arena in Kuala Lumpur, Malaysia.

== Background ==
The event marked the promotion's 17th visit to Kuala Lumpur and first since ONE: Mark of Greatness in December 2019. The event was first time in the two years the organization has hosted an event outside Singapore.

A ONE Strawweight Kickboxing World Championship bout for the vacant title between Zhang Peimian and Jonathan Di Bella headlined the event. Former champion Sam-A Gaiyanghadao announced retired from international competition after returning to Thailand from Singapore and where he had coached at Evolve MMA.

Former Glory Welterweight Champion Nieky Holzken and former ONE Lightweight World Championship challenger Islam Murtazaev were previously scheduled to meet in a lightweight kickboxing bout at ONE: X, but Murtazaev pulled out from the card due to the 2022 Russian invasion of Ukraine, all Russian athletes were removed from the card as a result of the Singaporean government banning them from entering the country and the bout was postponed to this date. In turn, Holzken withdrew from the bout due to an injured and was replaced by Constantin Rusu.

A flyweight muay thai bout between Chorfah Tor.Sangtiennoi and Denis Purić was scheduled to take place at the event. However, Chorfah withdraw due to has sustained an injury during training at the Sangtiennoi Camp and was replaced by Tagir Khalilov.

At the weigh-ins, Tagir Khalilov, Constantin Rusu and Gustavo Balart all failed hydration test and were forced to take catchweights. Khalilov weighed in at 137.5 lbs, 2.5 pounds over the limit, Balart came in at 130.75 lbs, 5.75 lbs over the strawweight limit, and Rusu at 173.25 lbs, 3.25 pounds over the limit.

== Results ==
Main card (YouTube / Watch ONE)
Weight class				Method	Round	Time	Notes
Strawweight Kickboxing	Jonathan Di Bella	def.	Zhang Peimian	Decision (unanimous)	5	3:00	(Note: For the vacant ONE Strawweight Kickboxing World Championship.)
Flyweight	Reece McLaren	def.	Windson Ramos	TKO (retirement)	2	5:00
Catchweight (173.25 lbs) Kickboxing	Constantin Rusu	def.	Islam Murtazaev	Decision (unanimous)	3	3:00	(Note: Rusu missed weight (173.25 lbs))
Catchweight (130.75 lbs)	Gustavo Balart	def.	Alex Silva	Decision (split)	3	5:00	(Note: Balart missed weight (130.75 lbs))
Featherweight Muay Thai	Jimmy Vienot	def.	Niclas Larsen	Decision (unanimous)	3	3:00
Flyweight	Eko Roni Saputra	def.	Yodkaikaew Fairtex	Submission (heel hook)	1	2:16
Lead card (YouTube / Watch ONE)
Bantamweight	Artem Belakh	def.	Leandro Issa	Decision (unanimous)	3	5:00
Catchweight (137.5 lbs) Muay Thai	Denis Purić	def.	Tagir Khalilov	Decision (unanimous)	3	3:00	(Note: Khalilov missed weight (137.5 lbs))
Welterweight	Ruslan Emilbek Uulu	def.	Ben Wilhelm	Submission (rear-naked choke)	1	4:58

== Bonus awards ==
The following fighters received $50,000 bonuses.

- Performance of the Night: Eko Roni Saputra

== See also ==
- 2022 in ONE Championship
- List of ONE Championship events
- List of current ONE fighters
