= Hamza Ngoto =

Kick-boxer who won the WBC Muay Thai super middleweight title in 2018

- Born: September 13, 1990 (age 36); France
- Nationality: (France) French
- Height: 197 cm (6 ft 5 1/2 in)
- Weight: 75 kg (165 lb; 12 st)
- Division: Super middleweight Light heavyweight
- Style: Muay Thai
- Fighting out of: France
- Team: Benattia Brothers
- Years active: 2015 – present

Kickboxing record
- Total: 51
- Wins: 50
- Losses: 1
- Last updated on: March 25, 2020

Hamza Ngoto (born September 13, 1990) is a French Muay Thai kickboxer who won the WBC Muay Thai super middleweight title in 2018.

== Muay thai career ==
Ngoto participated in the 2016 MAX Muay Thai tournament. He defeated Islam Murtazaev by decision in the semifinals, and Adrien Rubis by decision in the finals.

In August 2018, Ngoto fought Thongchai Sitsongpeenong for the WBC Muaythai super middleweight title. He won by a second round elbow KO.

Ngoto was scheduled to fight Toby Smith for the Lion Fight light heavyweight title, during Lion Fight 52. He defeated Smith by a split decision.

After winning the Lion Fight title, he was set to fight Gaëtan Dambo during Golden Fight. Ngoto won the fight by unanimous decision.

He defended his WBC Muaythai title for the first time in February 2020, when he was scheduled to fight Salimkhan Ibragimov. Ngoto won the fight by decision.

Ngoto was scheduled to face Mikael Benatar at Muay Thai Grand Prix on December 5, 2021.

== Titles and accomplishments ==
- 2019 Lion Fight Light Heavyweight World Champion (76 kg / 168 lb)
- 2018 WBC Muay Thai World Super Middleweight Champion (76.2 kg / 168 lb)
- 2016 MAX Muay Thai Champion (75 kg / 165 lb)
- 2015 IFMA World Muay Thai Championships (75 kg) (gold)
- 2014 IFMA World Muay Thai Championships B-class (75 kg) (gold)

== Fight record ==
Muay Thai record
51 Wins, 1 Loss
Date	Result	Opponent	Event	Location	Method	Round	Time
2023-03-17	Win	(Portugal) Adolfo Barão	Muay Thai Grand Prix	Paris, France	Decision	3	3:00
2021-12-05	Win	(France) Mikael Benatar	Muay Thai Grand Prix	Paris, France	TKO (Referee Stoppage)	3	3:00
2020-02-23	Win	(Russia) Salimkhan Ibragimov	Authentic Mix Martial Arts	Phuket, Thailand	Decision	5	3:00
Retains WBC Muay Thai super middleweight title.
2019-12-14	Win	(France) Gaëtan Dambo	Golden Fight	Paris, France	Decision (Unanimous)	5	3:00
2019-03-16	Win	(Australia) Toby Smith	Lion Fight 52 Dublin	Dublin, Ireland	Decision (split)	5	3:00
Wins Lion Fight light heavyweight title.
2018-11-09	Win	(Thailand) Rungrawee Kemmuaythaigym	Best of Siam 14	Paris, France	Decision	5	3:00
2018-08-23	Win	(Thailand) Thongchai Sitsongpeenong	Rajadamnern Stadium	Bangkok, Thailand	KO (Elbow)	2	2:35
Wins WBC Muay Thai super middleweight title.
2018-05-05	Win	(Thailand) Chanchai Sititisukato	Warriors Night	Paris, France	Decision	5	3:00
2018-04-14	Win	(Thailand) Singsamuang Kiatchansing	EFC Ultimate Fight Night	Lons-le-Saunier, France	KO	1	
2017-11-17	Win	(France) Jimmy Vienot	Warriors Night	Paris, France	Decision	5	3:00
2017-05-20	Win	(France) Johane Beausejour	Capital Fights 2	Paris, France	Decision	5	3:00
2017-04-08	Win	(Thailand) Tengnueng Sitjaesairoong	THAI FIGHT Paris	Paris, France	Decision	3	3:00
2016-11-19	Win	(Portugal) Diogo Calado	Radikal Fight Night Gold	France	Decision	5	3:00
2016-07-10	Loss	(England) Thomas Carpenter	MAX Muay Thai	Pattaya, Thailand	Decision	3	3:00
2016-04-01	Win	(France) Wendy Annonay	ShowThai 14	Paris, France	TKO	3	
2016-01-17	Win	(France) Adrien Rubis	MAX Muay Thai	Pattaya, Thailand	Decision	3	3:00
2016-01-17	Win	(Russia) Islam Murtazaev	MAX Muay Thai	Pattaya, Thailand	Decision	3	3:00
2015-10-31	Win	(France) James Benal	ShowThai 13	Paris, France	Decision	5	3:00
2015-06-06	Win	(France) Mehmet Kaya	Challenge Cup Muay Thai Elite WMC	Orléans, France	TKO	2	
Legend: Win Loss Draw/No contest Notes

Amateur Muay Thai record
Date	Result	Opponent	Event	Location	Method	Round	Time
2015-08-23	Win	(Russia) Islam Murtazaev	2015 IFMA World Championship, Final	Bangkok, Thailand	Decision	3	3:00
Wins 2015 IFMA World Championships -75kg Gold Medal.
2015-08-	Win	(Thailand) Surichay Pattanaphong	2015 IFMA World Championship, Semi Final	Bangkok, Thailand	TKO (Elbow)	2	
2015-08-	Win	(Kazakhstan) Vadim Loparev	2015 IFMA World Championship, Quarter Final	Bangkok, Thailand	Decision	3	3:00
2015-08-	Win	(Turkey) Dogan Ali	2015 IFMA World Championship, Round of 16	Bangkok, Thailand	Decision	3	3:00
2014-05-	Win	(Peru) Sergio Mazzetti	2014 IFMA World Championship, Final	Langkawi, Malaysia			
Wins 2014 IFMA World Championships B-class -75kg Gold Medal.
2014-05-	Win	(Canada) Jacob Mackenzie	2014 IFMA World Championship, Semi Final	Langkawi, Malaysia			
2014-05-	Win	(Kazakhstan) Vadim Loparev	2014 IFMA World Championship, Quarter Final	Langkawi, Malaysia			
2014-05-	Win	(Germany) Sabio Matina Qulla	2014 IFMA World Championship, Second round	Langkawi, Malaysia			
2014-05-	Win	(Denmark) Frederik Winter	2014 IFMA World Championship, First round	Langkawi, Malaysia			
Legend: Win Loss Draw/No contest Notes

== See also ==
- List of male kickboxers
- List of WBC Muaythai world champions
