= Constantin Rusu =

Moldovan kickboxer

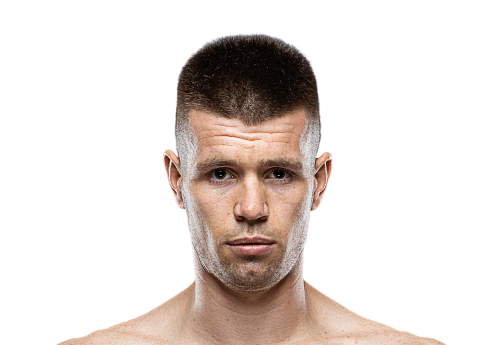
- Born: May 17, 1994 (age 32); Chișinău, Moldova
- Nickname: Lioncrusher
- Height: 180 cm (5 ft 11 in)
- Weight: 77 kg (170 lb; 12.1 st)
- Division: Welterweight
- Reach: 180 cm (71 in)
- Style: Kickboxing
- Stance: Orthodox
- Fighting out of: Chișinău, Moldova; Iași, Romania
- Team: Lion Fight Academy; Scorpions Iași
- Years active: 2016–present

Kickboxing record
- Total: 37
- Wins: 28
- By knockout: 9
- Losses: 8
- By knockout: 3
- Draws: 1

Constantin Rusu (born May 17, 1994) is a Moldovan-Romanian kickboxer, currently competing in the lightweight division of ONE Championship. He is the former KOK and FEA welterweight champion. A professional competitor since 2016, Rusu has also competed for Colosseum Tournament and Dynamite Fighting Show in Romania.

He was ranked as a top-ten welterweight kickboxer in the world by Beyond Kick between November 2022 and December 2023.

== Kickboxing career ==
=== King of Kings ===
Rusu faced Denis Apavaloae at KOK Hero's World Series on September 30, 2017. He won the fight by a first-round knockout. Rusu next faced Pavel Pravashynski at KOK World GP 2017 In Moldova on December 9, 2017. He once again won the fight by first-round stoppage, as he knocked Pravashynski out with a flurry of punches at the 1:37 minute mark.

These two victories earned him a place in the 2018 King of Kings welterweight "Hero's Tournament", which took place on March 24, 2018. Rusu faced Matteo Calzetta in the semifinals of the one-day tournament and beat him by unanimous decision. He advanced to the finals, where he faced his countryman Dorel Cristian. Rusu won the fight and the tournament title by a narrow split decision.

Rusu faced the two-time World Boxing Council Muaythai champion Cheick Sidibé in an 80 kilogram bout at the July 4, 2018, Tatneft Cup event. He won the fight by unanimous decision. Rusu made his second consecutive Tatneft Cup appearance against Victor Monfort on August 24, 2018, once again in an 80 kilogram bout. He won the fight by unanimous decision.

Rusu was expected to face the reigning King of Kings Welterweight (-77 kg) champion Zaurs Džavadovs at KOK Fight Series 2018 in Riga on October 27, 2018. The pair previously fought in the finals of the 2017 KOK Hero's welterweight tournament, with Džavadovs winning their first meeting by unanimous decision. Džavadovs withdrew from the bout on October 26, due to problems with his vision, and was stripped of the belt. Džavadovs was diagnosed with diplopia a few months before the title fight was supposed to take place. As his condition worsened in the days leading up to the fight, he wasn't cleared to compete at the pre-fight medical check. Rusu was rescheduled to face Latvian Aleksejs Marizihins for the vacant title at the same event. He won the fight by unanimous decision.

=== FEA ===
Rusu made his FEA Fighting Entertainment Association promotional debut against Chico Kwasi at FEA World Series 27 on December 8, 2018. He won the fight by unanimous decision.

Rusu was then placed in the 2018 FEA Welterweight tournament, held to crown the FEA Welterweight (-77 kg) champion. He faced Alan Scheinson in the semifinals of the one-day tournament at FEA 28 on March 30, 2019. He won the fight by a second-round technical knockout, forcing a referee stoppage with a flurry of punches at the 1:53 minute mark. Rusu faced Dorel Cristian in the finals. He previously fought Cristian in the finals of the 2018 KOK Hero's Welterweight Tournament, when was able to beat him by split decision. Rusu was more convincing in the rematch, as he was needed just 53 seconds to knock his opponent out.

Rusu faced Ricardo Fernades for the vacant WKL Middleweight (-75 kg) K-1 title at Fighting Championship Events on June 8, 2019. He won the fight by decision.

Rusu moved down in weight in order to take part in the 2019 FEA Lightweight tournament. He was booked to face Furkan Karabag in the semifinals of the one-day tournament, which took place on August 17, 2019. Although Rusu was able to beat Karabag by split decision, he suffered a decision loss to Zhora Akopyan in the finals. The bout with Akopyan was ruled a draw after the first three rounds were contested, but a unanimous decision was awarded to the Armenian fighter after an extra fourth round was fought.

Rusu was stripped of the King of Kings Welterweight (-77 kg) Championship on December 2, 2019, due to inactivity.

Rusu faced Pavel Grishanovich at FEA: Keep Grinding 2 on December 7, 2019. He won the fight by unanimous decision. Rusu faced Mina Manoli at FEA Kickboxing: Reset on March 13, 2021, following a fifteen-month absence from the sport. He won the fight by unanimous decision.

=== Dynamite Fighting Show ===
In December 2021, it was reported that Robin Ciric, who had been slated to co-headline DFS 13 show against Florin Lambagiu on December 15, had tested positive for COVID-19, and that Rusu would be stepping in for Ciric. Rusu won the fight by an upset unanimous decision. He was nominated for a Debut of the Year award by the promotion.

=== ONE Championship ===
Rusu faced Marouan Toutouh in his ONE Championship debut at ONE 158 on June 3, 2022. He won the fight by unanimous decision. Rusu scored the sole knockdown of the fight in the first round, as he dropped Toutouh with a spinning backfist.

Rusu faced Islam Murtazaev at ONE 162 on October 21, 2022, stepping in as a short-notice replacement for Nieky Holzken, who withdrew with an injury. At the weigh-ins, Rusu failed hydration test and was forced to take a catchweight, coming in at 173.25 lbs, 3.25 pounds over the limit. Rusu won the fight by unanimous decision.

Rusu faced Bogdan Shumarov at ONE Fight Night 12 on July 14, 2023. He lost the fight by a third-round knockout.

Rusu faced Eduard Saik for the vacant RCC Welterweight (-77 kg) title at RCC 17 on December 15, 2023. He lost the fight by unanimous decision.

Rusu was expected to face Dani Traoré at SENSHI 21 on April 20, 2024. Traore later withdrew and was replaced by Nikola Cvetkovic. Rusu won the fight by unanimous decision.

== Championships and accomplishments ==
- SENSHI
  - 2026 SENSHI Welterweight (-75 kg) Grand Prix 3rd place
- Dynamite Fighting Show
  - 2021 Debut of the Year nomination
- King of Kings
  - 2018 KOK Welterweight Championship
  - 2018 KOK Hero's Welterweight Tournament Winner
  - 2017 KOK Hero's Welterweight Tournament Runner-up
- FEA Fighting Entertainment Association
  - 2018 FEA Welterweight Championship
  - 2019 FEA Lightweight Tournament Runner-up
- World Kickboxing League
  - 2019 WKL Middleweight (-75 kg) K-1 Championship

== Kickboxing record ==
Kickboxing record
28 Wins (9 (T)KO's), 8 Losses, 1 Draw, 0 No Contests
Date	Result	Opponent	Event	Location	Method	Round	Time
2026-04-03	Win	(Romania) Florin Lambagiu	Dynamite Fighting Show 30	Bucharest, Romania	Decision (Unanimous)	3	3:00
2026-02-28	Win	(Kazakhstan) Aibek Amanov	SENSHI 30 – 75 kg Grand Prix, 3rd place bout	Varna, Bulgaria	Decision (Split)	3	3:00
2026-02-28	Loss	(Bulgaria) Zhulien Rikov	SENSHI 30 – 75 kg Grand Prix, Semifinals	Varna, Bulgaria	Ext.R Decision (Unanimous)	4	3:00
2026-02-28	Win	(Romania) Florin Lambagiu	SENSHI 30 – 75 kg Grand Prix, Quarterfinals	Varna, Bulgaria	Decision (Unanimous)	3	3:00
2024-12-07	Loss	(Italy) Michael Samperi	SENSHI 24	Varna, Bulgaria	TKO (High kick)	2	3:00
2024-04-20	Win	(Serbia) Nikola Cvetković	SENSHI 21	Varna, Bulgaria	Decision (Unanimous)	3	3:00
2023-12-15	Loss	(Russia) Eduard Saik	RCC 17	Yekaterinburg, Russia	Decision (Unanimous)	5	3:00
For the vacant RCC Welterweight (-77 kg) title.
2023-07-14	Loss	(Bulgaria) Bogdan Shumarov	ONE Fight Night 12	Bangkok, Thailand	TKO (Head kick)	3	1:33
2022-10-21	Win	(Russia) Islam Murtazaev	ONE 162	Kuala Lumpur, Malaysia	Decision (Unanimous)	3	3:00
2022-06-03	Win	(Morocco) Marouan Toutouh	ONE 158	Kallang, Singapore	Decision (Unanimous)	3	3:00
2021-12-15	Win	(Romania) Florin Lambagiu	Dynamite Fighting Show 13	Bucharest, Romania	Decision (Unanimous)	3	3:00
2021-10-23	Loss	(Russia) Vasilii Semenov	RCC 17	Yekaterinburg, Russia	Decision (Unanimous)	3	3:00
2021-03-13	Win	(Moldova) Mina Manoli	FEA Kickboxing: Reset	Chișinău, Moldova	Decision (Unanimous)	3	3:00
2019-12-07	Win	(Belarus) Pavel Grishanovich	FEA: Keep Grinding 2	Chișinău, Moldova	Decision (Unanimous)	3	3:00
2019-08-17	Loss	(Armenia) Zhora Akopyan	FEA WGP, -71 kg Tournament Final	Odesa, Ukraine	Ext.R Decision (Unanimous)	4	3:00
For the vacant FEA Lightweight (-71 kg) title.
2019-08-17	Win	(Turkey) Furkan Karabağ	FEA WGP, -71 kg Tournament Semifinal	Odesa, Ukraine	Decision (Split)	3	3:00
2019-06-08	Win	(Portugal) Ricardo Fernandes	Fighting Championship Events	Lisbon, Portugal	Decision	5	3:00
Won the WKL Middleweight (-75 kg) title.
2019-03-30	Win	(Moldova) Cristian Dorel	FEA 28, Welterweight Tournament Final	Chișinău, Moldova	TKO (Referee stoppage)	1	0:53
Won the vacant FEA Welterweight (-77 kg) title.
2019-03-30	Win	(Argentina) Alan Scheinson	FEA 28, Welterweight Tournament Semifinal	Chișinău, Moldova	TKO (Punches)	2	1:53
2018-12-08	Win	(Netherlands) Chico Kwasi	FEA 27	Chișinău, Moldova	Decision (Unanimous)	3	3:00
2018-10-27	Win	(Latvia) Aleksejs Marizihins	KOK Fight Series 2018 in Riga	Riga, Latvia	Decision (Unanimous)	5	3:00
Won the vacant KOK Welterweight (-77 kg) title.
2018-08-24	Win	(Spain) Victor Monfort	Tatneft Cup	Kazan, Russia	Decision (Unanimous)	3	3:00
2018-07-04	Win	(France) Cheick Sidibé	Tatneft Cup, -80 kg Prestige Fight	Kazan, Russia	Decision (Unanimous)	3	3:00
2018-03-24	Win	(Moldova) Cristian Dorel	KOK 36 Hero's World Series, Welterweight Tournament Final	Chișinău, Moldova	Decision (Split)	3	3:00
Won the KOK Welterweight (-77 kg) Hero's Tournament title.
2018-03-24	Win	(Italy) Matteo Calzetta	KOK 36 Hero's World Series, Welterweight Tournament Semifinal	Chișinău, Moldova	Decision (Unanimous)	3	3:00
2017-12-09	Win	(Belarus) Pavel Pravashynski	KOK World GP 2017 In Moldova	Chișinău, Moldova	TKO (Punches)	1	1:37
2017-09-30	Win	(Moldova) Denis Apăvăloae	KOK Hero's World Series	Chișinău, Moldova	KO (Body shot)	1	1:45
2017-08-23	Win	(Russia) Sahab Vagapov	Akhmat Fight Show	Kazan, Russia	KO (Body kick)		
2017-07-14	Win	(Romania) Adrian Cibu	Colosseum Tournament 3: Romania vs. Germany	Constanța, Romania	KO (Knee to the body)	2	2:02
2017-06-17	Win	(Romania) Alin Cîmpan	Colosseum Tournament 2	Ploiești, Romania	Decision (Unanimous)	3	3:00
2017-04-01	Win	(Romania) Emilian Sîngeorzan	Colosseum Tournament 1	Ploiești, Romania	TKO (Referee stoppage)	2	3:00
2017-02-25	Loss	(Latvia) Zaurs Džavadovs	KOK Hero's Series 2017 In Riga, Welterweight Tournament Finals	Riga, Latvia	Decision (Unanimous)	3	3:00
For the KOK Welterweight (-77 kg) Hero's Tournament title.
2017-02-25	Win	(United Kingdom) Danny Richards	KOK Hero's Series 2017 In Riga, Welterweight Tournament Semifinals	Riga, Latvia	TKO (Referee stoppage)	1	1:10
2016-12-10	Draw	(Moldova) Andrei Terenti	KOK World GP 2016 Moldova	Chișinău, Moldova	Decision (Unanimous)	3	3:00
2016-09-06	Loss	(Russia) Dmitry Menshikov	TATNEFT CUP, -80 kg Tournament Quarter Final	Russia	TKO (Straight Right)	2	2:25
2016-03-20	Win	(Romania) Cezar Buzdugan	GP Tracia 33	Cluj-Napoca, Romania	Decision (Unanimous)	3	3:00
Legend: Win Loss Draw/No contest Notes

== See also ==
- List of male kickboxers
