= Leonid Oleinicenco =

Member of UEFA and football administrator

President of the Moldovan Football Federation
- Incumbent
- Assumed office 22 May 2019
- Preceded by: Pavel Cebanu

Personal details
- Born: 8 December 1980 (age 45) Chișinău, Moldavian SSR, Soviet Union
- Education: Academy of Economic Studies of Moldova; University of Lausanne; University of Limoges

Leonid Oleinicenco (born 14 December 1981) is a football administrator and Member of UEFA. He was elected President of the Football Federation of Moldova in 2019, succeeding Pavel Cebanu.

== Background ==
He started his career in 2009 with the Moldovan federation as a finance director till 2015 and later was executive officer in 2015. In that year he enrolled at the University of Lausanne management study course after working for more than ten years.

His predecessor, Pavel Cebanu, was the president of FMF from 1997 until his retirement in 2019.
