= Dorin Damir =

VP of the Judo Federation of Moldova

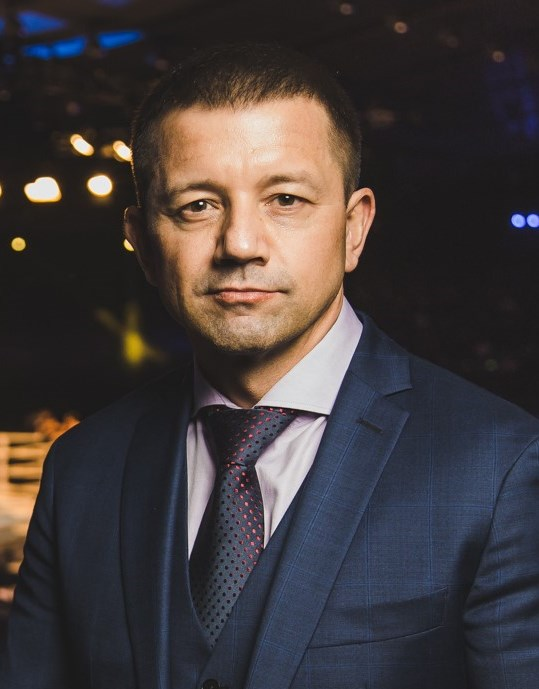
- Born: 20 March 1972 (age 54); Calarasi District, Moldovan SSR, USSR
- Occupations: President FEA (Fighting & Entertainment Association) and businessman
- Years active: 1994–present
- Known for: President of the FEA Fighting Entertainment Association of Moldova
- Children: 3

Dorin Mikhailovich Damir (Russian: Дорин Михайлович Дамир), born on 20 March 1972 is the vice president of the Judo Federation of Moldova (2005 - 2012), the president of the Fighting & Entertainment Association of Moldova (FEA), the president of the Moldovan Amateur K-1 Federation (WAK-1F Moldova), and the vice president of the World Amateur K-1 Federation, WAK-1F, as well as a businessman.

== Biography ==
Damir is the president of the Fighting & Entertainment Association of Moldova (FEA), president of the Moldovan Amateur K-1 Federation of (WAK-1F Moldova), and the vice president of the World Amateur K-1 Federation, (WAK-1F).

Damir graduated high school in 1987 and college in 1991. After completing college he entered the National Police Academy. Upon completion of his training at the academy, he worked in a special unit of the Ministry of Internal Affairs of the Republic of Moldova (Department for Combating Corruption and Organized Crime).

In 2002, Damir was transferred to the reserve, and since 2002 he has worked in the field of business, security, investment, consulting, and real estate. He obtained his bachelor's degree in International Economic Relations and later a master's degree in Sports Management. He is married and has three children.

From 2005 to 2012 he retained the position of vice president of the Moldova Judo Federation.

== Awards and honors ==
Damir holds the 1st Dan Black Belt in Taekwondo. He is also a hand-to-hand combat instructor. He is still practicing boxing and Muay Thai. He has made a notable contribution to the development of martial arts in the Republic of Moldova.

In 2009, Damir founded the Fighting & Entertainment Association of Moldova (FEA) which aims to promote Moldovan fighters to world rings and tatami, encourage a healthy lifestyle among young people and increase the popularity of K-1 in Moldova. In 2009, the first FEA GP tournament was held, with the participation of Moldovan fighters in the 84 kg weight class. Together with the Japanese and European partners, Damir Dorin established the "King Of Kings Project (KOK)". In 2010, for the first time in Moldova, the BUSHIDO FC tournament was held, with 5 fights according to the MMA rules and 5 fights according to the K-1 rules. In 2011, Damir registered the "FIGHTING EAGLES" Project which in a short time has gained huge popularity in Moldova. Damir has continued to hold tournaments, and to date there have been nine major events.

== Controversies ==
In 2026 Dorin Damir, the president of the FEA association and godson of the former democratic leader Vladimir Plahotniuc, was detained shortly after being sentenced to three years in prison. Dorin Damir, Alexandru Pînzari and Valeriu Cojocaru were sentenced on Monday, January 19, to three years in prison each, being found guilty of abuse of power and job misuse in the case of fictitious hiring at the former Directorate 5 of the National Investigation Inspectorate. The decision was made by the Chisinau Court, Buiucani headquarters.

== Championships organized ==
1. GRAND PRIX FEA 2009 K-1 rules
2. FEA presents BUSHIDO FC IN MOLDOVA 2010 Moldova VS Europe
3. K-1 PRESENTS K.O.K. WORLD GRAND PRIX 2010 IN CHISINAU
4. FEA PRESENTS K.O.K. EUROPE GRAND PRIX 2011
5. K.O.K. WORLD GRAND PRIX 2011 LIGHT HEAVYWEIGHT 83 kg
6. FEA PRESENTS "FIGHTING EAGLES" EUROPE SERIES K-1 & MMA RULES 2011
7. "K.O.K. EUROPE GRAND PRIX 2012 Light Welterweight 63 kg"
8. "FEA PRESENTS Vol. 8 KOK WORLD GP 2012 LIGHTWEIGHT TOURNAMENT"
9. FEA PRESENTS Vol. 9 "FIGHTING EAGLES" EUROPE SERIES K-1 & MMA RULES 2012
10. FEA presents Vol. 10 K-1 WORLD GP 2013 LIGHT HEAVYWEIGHT Tournament in Moldova.
11. FEA presents Vol. 11 KOK WORLD GP 2013 Middleweight Tournament in CHISINAU.
12. FEA presents Vol. 12 EAGLES KOK WORLD SERIES 2013
13. FEA presents Vol. 13 KOK WORLD GP 2014 Middleweight Tournament in CHISINAU.
14. FEA presents KOK WORLD GP 2014 in CHISINAU 19 September 2014 Vol. 21
15. FEA presents Vol. 25 KOK WORLD GP HEAVYWEIGHT TOURNAMENT EAGLES SERIES 2014 in MOLDOVA
16. KOK WORLD GP Middleweight Tournament 2015 in MOLDOVA Vol. 27 April 4
17. KOK WGP 2015 Heavyweight Tournament EAGLES SERIES in Moldova. 26 September
18. KOK WGP 2015 Welterweight Tournament EAGLES SERIES in Moldova 19/12/15/.Vol.32
19. KOK WGP 2016 Middleweight Tournament in Moldova. Vol. 37 April 9.
20. FEA presents KOK WORLD GP 01.10.16
21. KOK WORLD GP 2016 in MOLDOVA Vol.42 December 10
22. KOK WORLD GP 2017 in MOLDOVA Vol.46 April 1
23. KOK WORLD GP 2017 in MOLDOVA Vol.48 September 30
24. KOK WORLD GP 2017 in MOLDOVA Vol. 53 December 9
25. KOK WORLD GP 2018 in MOLDOVA Vol, 56 March 24
26. FEA WORLD GP vol.26 6 October 2018
27. FEA 27 K-1 Rules 8 December. 2018
28. FEA WGP vol.28. 30 March 2019.
29. FEA WORLD GP ODESSA 24 August 2019
30. FEA KICKBOXING WGP 7 Dec 2019
31. FEA KICKBOXING RESET 13.03.2021
32. FEA KEEPGRINDING 13.11.2021

== WAK-1F Moldova ==
Being the President of the Moldovan Amateur K-1 Federation, Damir organized the Amateur K-1 Championship for the first time in Moldova. More than 200 athletes from 22 Moldovan sports clubs participated in the Republic Championship. Fighters from Moldova WAK-1F Federation successfully participated in the K-1 European Championship, the Asian Open Championship, and the European Cup.

== EAGLES FC (Fighting Championship) ==
EAGLES FC (Fighting Championship), the new, unique Moldavian combative project which will follow the rules of MMA. The symbol of an eagle has been shaped through centuries. The eagle is a well known symbol of freedom and courage. The eagle is located on the coat of arms of many world powers. A victory is not only for the fighter, but also all of the country.

1. EAGLES I Fighting Championship 27 February 2016
2. EAGLES II Elimination Tournament & Fighting Championship 27 May 2016
3. EAGLES III Elimination Tournament & Fighting Championship 14 November 2016.
4. EAGLES IV Elimination Tournament & Fighting Championship 18 February 2017
5. EAGLES V Elimination Tournament & Fighting Championship 20 May 2017
6. EAGLES VI Russia VS Moldova 24 June 2017
7. EAGLES VII Elimination Tournament & Fighting Championship 4 November 2017
8. EAGLES VIII Elimination Tournament & Fighting Championship 10 February 2018
9. EAGLES MMA IX 26 May 2018
10. EAGLES 10 MMA Elimination Tournament & Fighting Championship 3 November 2018
11. EAGLES 11 Elimination Tournament & Fighting Championship 15 February 2019
12. EAGLES ELIMINATION SUMMER EDITION 22 June 2019
13. EAGLES ELIMINATION 26 OCTOBER 2019
14. EAGLES NEXT LEVEL. 15.02.2020
15. EAGLES RESET 13 March 2021
16. EAGLES FC DANGER ZONE 13 November 2021
