= Daniel Forsberg =

Finish male professional kickboxer

- Born: 1 January 1992 (age 34); Turku, Finland
- Other names: The Finnisher
- Nationality: Finnish
- Height: 1.80 m (5 ft 11 in)
- Weight: 86 kg (190 lb; 13 st 8 lb)
- Style: Kickboxing; Muay Thai
- Fighting out of: Turku, Finland
- Team: Turku Muay Thai
- Years active: 2008-present

Kickboxing record
- Total: 24
- Wins: 18
- By knockout: 5
- Losses: 6
- By knockout: 2

Daniel Forsberg (born 1 January 1992) is a Finnish Muay Thai kickboxer. He is the current KOK Middleweight Champion. In July and August 2021, Combat Press ranked him as the #10 middleweight in the world.

== Martial arts career ==
Forsberg was scheduled to fight veteran Jiri Zak at Gibu Fight Night 2 on 5 December 2015. He won the fight by unanimous decision.

Forsberg was scheduled to face Lukáš Dvořák at Heroes Gate 16 on 13 March 2016. Dvořák won the bout by split decision.

Forsberg took part in a King of Kings Middleweight tournament, held at KOK 45 on October 26, 2018. Forsberg won the semifinal match against Karolis Liukatis by unanimous decision. Advancing to the tournament finals, he faced Ali Al Ameri. Al Ameri won the final by a second-round knockout, landing a well placed knee 25 seconds into the round.

Forsberg was scheduled to face Tomas Steponkevicius at KOK Hero's Series in Vilnius on 16 March 2019. He won the fight by a third-round knockout.

Forsberg was scheduled to face Yuri Orlov at Mõisaküla Fight 3 on 3 August 2018. He won the fight by an extra round unanimous decision.

Forsberg was scheduled to fight Hendrik Themas at FIGHTLAND 2018 on 8 December 2018. He won the fight by majority decision.

Forsberg was scheduled to face Raimonds Aukstikalnis at KOK World GP in Riga 2018 on 26 October 2018. He won the fight by split decision.

Forsberg fought a rematch with Raimonds Aukstikalnis at KOK World GP in Helsinki 2019 on 17 May 2019, for the KOK Middleweight title. Forsberg was more convincing in their second meeting, winning the fight by unanimous decision.

Forsberg was scheduled to make his first title defense against Jurijs Orlovs at KOK 81: World Series on 26 October 2019. He successfully defended the title through a third-round technical knockout, due to a doctor stoppage. The bout ended because of a broken nose suffered by Orlovs from an accidental headbutt.

Forsberg challenged Chip Moraza-Pollard for the Lion Fight 160 lbs title at Lion Fight 61 on 11 January 2020. Moraza-Pollard won the fight by unanimous decision, with scores of 46–49, 46–49, 46–49.

Forsberg was scheduled to make his second title defense against Dawid Mirkowski at KOK 83 on 29 February 2020. He later withdrew from the bout due to illness.

Forsberg took part in the Leveli Fight Night openweight tournament on 29 May 2021, being scheduled to face Uku Jürjendal in the semifinals. Although he came into the bout as a favorite, Forsberg struggled to achieve any headway against a larger opponent. He lost the fight by unanimous decision.

== Championships and accomplishments ==
=== Professional ===
- King of Kings
  - KOK Middleweight (-85 kg) Championship
    - One successful title defense

=== Amateur ===
- Suomen Muay Thai Liitto
  - (bronze) 2011 National Muaythai Championships (-81 kg)
  - (gold) 2012 National Muaythai Championships (-86 kg)
  - (gold) 2013, 2014 & 2015 National Muaythai Championships (-81 kg)
  - (gold) 2018 National Muaythai Championships (+91 kg)
- International Federation of Muaythai Associations
  - (bronze) 2016 IFMA World Championship (-86 kg)
  - (gold) 2025 IFMA World Championship (-91 kg)

== Kickboxing record ==
Kickboxing record
18 wins (5 (T)KOs), 6 losses, 0 draws
Date	Result	Opponent	Event	Location	Method	Round	Time
2026-09-19	Loss	(Finland) Magamed Gadiev	Ice Cage 8	Turku, Finland	Decision (unanimous)	3	
2025-05-03	Win	(Finland) Magamed Gadiev	Ice Cage 4	Helsinki, Finland	Decision (unanimous)	3	
2023-03-25	Loss	(Poland) Jakub Szmajda	Krwawy Sport 6	Włocławek, Poland	TKO (leg injury)	1	
For the Hardcore Division 100 kg title.
2021-12-20	Loss	(Russia) Aleksei Dimitriev	Leveli Fight Night 2: Christmas Mayhem	Espoo, Finland	Decision (split)	3	3:00
2021-05-29	Loss	(Estonia) Uku Jürjendal	Leveli Fight Night, Tournament Semifinal	Espoo, Finland	Decision (unanimous)	3	3:00
2020-01-11	Loss	(United States) Chip Moraza-Pollard	Lion Fight 61	Las Vegas, Nevada, United States	Decision (unanimous)	5	3:00
For the Lion Fight Cruiserweight (-84 kg) title.
2019-10-26	Win	(Latvia) Yuri Orlov	KOK 81: World Series	Riga, Latvia	TKO (doctor stoppage)	3	3:00
Defends the KOK Middleweight (-85 kg) title.
2019-05-17	Win	(Latvia) Raimonds Aukstikalnis	KOK World GP in Helsinki 2019	Helsinki, Finland	Decision (unanimous)	5	3:00
Wins the KOK Middleweight (-85 kg) title.
2019-03-16	Win	(Lithuania) Tomas Steponkevicius	KOK Hero's Series in Vilnius	Vilnius, Lithuania	KO	3	
2018-12-08	Win	(Estonia) Hendrik Themas	FIGHTLAND 2018	Keila, Estonia	Decision (majority)	3	3:00
2018-10-26	Win	(Latvia) Raimonds Aukstikalnis	KOK World GP in Riga 2018	Riga, Latvia	Decision (split)	3	3:00
2018-08-03	Win	(Latvia) Yuri Orlov	Mõisaküla Fight 3	Mõisaküla, Estonia	Ext. R. decision (unanimous)	3	3:00
2017-03-17	Loss	(Spain) Ali El Ameri	KOK 45, Middleweight Tournament Final	Vilnius, Lithuania	KO (knee)	2	0:25
2017-03-17	Win	(Lithuania) Karolis Liukatis	KOK 45, Middleweight Tournament Semifinal	Vilnius, Lithuania	Decision (unanimous)	3	3:00
2016-03-13	Loss	(Czech Republic) Lukáš Dvořák	Heroes Gate 16	Prague, Czech Republic	Decision (split)	5	3:00
2016-02-20	Win	(Denmark) Kim Nielsen	Siam Warriors III	Copenhagen, Denmark	KO (body shot)	1	
2015-12-05	Win	(Czech Republic) Jiri Zak	Gibu Fight Night 2	Prague, Czech Republic	Decision (unanimous)	5	3:00
2015-09-26	Win	(Sweden) Jafar Mukri	Promotion Showdown vol. 2	Turku, Finland	KO (left straight)	2	
2014-11-07	Win	(Lithuania) Mantas Stankis	Best Fight	Klaipėda, Lithuania	Decision (unanimous)	3	3:00
2014-08-11	Win	(United Kingdom) Liam Walsh	FKB 7	Helsinki, Finland	Decision (unanimous)	3	3:00
2014-07-23	Win	(New Zealand) Danny Ulberg	FKB 6	Helsinki, Finland	Decision (unanimous)	3	3:00
2014-03-07	Win	(Finland) Johan Verta	Finnish Power	Helsinki, Finland	Decision (unanimous)	3	3:00
2014-02-01	Win	(United Kingdom) Christian Tate	FMT: Secret Combo	Helsinki, Finland	Decision (unanimous)	3	3:00
2013-12-08	Win	(Finland) Joaquin Peterson	FKBF: New Lions	Helsinki, Finland	TKO	1	

Amateur kickboxing and Muay Thai record (incomplete)
33 Wins (7 (T) KOs), 14 losses, 0 draws
Date	Result	Opponent	Event	Location	Method	Round	Time
2025-11-22	Win	(Albania) Egli Sina	IFMA 2025 European Championships	Athens, Greece	TKO	1	
2024-02-16	Win	(Finland) Valtteri Norrena	Finnish Muay Thai Championship 2025	Lahti, Finland	Decision (unanimous)	3	3:00
2024-03-16	Win	(Finland) Jesse Rapo	Finnish Muay Thai Championship 2024	Oulu, Finland	Decision (unanimous)	3	3:00
2018-05-14	Loss	(Turkey) Ali Dogan	2018 IFMA World Championship, Tournament Quarterfinal	Cancun, Mexico	TKO	3	2:00
2018-05-12	Win	(Spain) Victor Monfort Fernandez	2018 IFMA World Championship, Tournament First Round	Cancun, Mexico	Decision	3	2:00
2018-03-13	Win	(Finland) Antti Ikonen	Finnish Muay Thai Championship	Joensuu, Finland	Decision	3	2:00
Wins the 2018 Finnish National Muay Thai Championship.
2015-04-26	Win	(Finland) Olli Leppänen	Finnish Kickboxing Championship	Finland	Decision	3	2:00
2015-02-15	Win	(Finland) Jussi Pirttikangas	Finnish Muay Thai Championship	Cancun, Mexico	Decision	3	2:00
Wins the 2015 Finnish National Muay Thai Championship.
2015-11-14	Win	(Finland) Joakim Siljuberg	Nordic Muay Thai Championships		Decision (unanimous)	3	3:00
2015-05-16	Win	(Russia) Nadir Iskhakov	Fight Promotion Showdown	Helsinki, Finland	Decision (split)	3	3:00
2015-02-13	Win	(Finland) Jussi Pirttikangas	Finnish Muay Thai Championship	Helsinki, Finland	Decision (unanimous)	3	3:00
2014-05-01	Loss	(Turkey) Aygun Mehmet	World Championship in Malaysia	Helsinki, Finland	Decision (unanimous)	3	3:00
2014-01-17	Win	(Finland) Johan Vänttinen	Finnish Championship 2014	Helsinki, Finland	WO		
2013-10-26	Win	(Finland) Rickard Pettersson	Lucky Punch	Helsinki, Finland	TKO	1	
2013-09-14	Win	(Finland) Mikko Soikkeli	Turku Fight 5	Helsinki, Finland	TKO	4	
2013-07-28	Win	(Finland) Bruno Sabtis		Helsinki, Finland	Decision (unanimous)	3	2:00
2013-04-06	Win	(Finland) Jani Toivonen	Fight For Glory	Helsinki, Finland	TKO	5	
2013-03-16	Win	(Finland) Panu Korpivaara	Finnish Championship Finals 2013	Helsinki, Finland	Decision (unanimous)	3	2:00
2013-03-02	Win	(Finland) Mikko Soikkeli		Helsinki, Finland	Decision (unanimous)	3	2:00
2012-02-09	Win	(Finland) Timo Suhonen		Helsinki, Finland	Decision (unanimous)	3	2:00
2012-11-24	Loss	(Finland) Yassin Bensenouci	Nordic Championship	Helsinki, Finland	Decision (unanimous)	4	2:00
2012-06-09	Win	(Finland) Aldo Reinla		Helsinki, Finland	TKO	5	
2012-05-26	Win	(Finland) Juha Vanhalakka		Helsinki, Finland	TKO	4	
2012-03-17	Win	(Finland) Aldo Reinla	Combat Academy of Finland Fight Event	Helsinki, Finland	Decision (unanimous)	4	2:00
2011-09-24	Loss	(Finland) Petter Wallin	Battle of Botnia 4	Helsinki, Finland	Decision (split)	4	2:00
2011-07-30	Loss	(Finland) Filipia Kulawinski		Helsinki, Finland	Decision (split)	4	2:00
2011-04-17	Win	(Finland) Jones Hassandor	2011 Finnish Championships, Tournament Semifinals	Helsinki, Finland	Decision (unanimous)	3	2:00
Wins the 2011 Finnish Championships (-81 kg) Bronze Medal.
2011-04-16	Win	(Finland) Artem Semen	2011 Finnish Championships, Tournament Quarterfinals	Helsinki, Finland	Decision (unanimous)	3	2:00
2011-04-16	Win	(Finland) Deni Denisenko	2011 Finnish Championships, First Round	Helsinki, Finland	Decision (unanimous)	3	2:00
2011-04-09	Loss	(Finland) Ville Aalto		Helsinki, Finland	Decision (unanimous)	5	2:00
2011-01-29	Loss	(Finland) Panu Korpivaara		Helsinki, Finland	Decision (split)	5	2:00
2010-12-04	Win	(Finland) Olli Leppänen		Helsinki, Finland	Decision (unanimous)	5	2:00
2010-11-27	Win	(Finland) Jarno Laitinen	Turku Fight	Helsinki, Finland	Decision (unanimous)	5	2:00
2010-10-23	Win	(Finland) Panu Korpivaara		Helsinki, Finland	Decision (split)	5	2:00
2010-04-17	Win	(Finland) Jani Majander		Helsinki, Finland	Decision (unanimous)	4	2:00
2010-04-03	Win	(Finland) Janne Ollonen	Turku Fight Resurrection	Helsinki, Finland	Decision (unanimous)	5	2:00
2010-02-06	Loss	(Finland) Jani Toivonen		Helsinki, Finland	TKO	2	
2009-12-12	Loss	(Finland) Simo Ukkonen		Helsinki, Finland	Decision (split)	5	2:00
2009-11-21	Win	(Greece) Nikolaos Dimitriadis		Helsinki, Finland	Decision (unanimous)	5	2:00
2009-10-24	Win	(Finland) Jussi Pirttikangas	Finnish Youth Championship 2009	Helsinki, Finland	Decision (unanimous)	5	2:00
2009-05-23	Win	(Finland) Simo Ukkonen		Helsinki, Finland	Decision (unanimous)	4	2:00
2009-03-28	Win	(Finland) Tatu Verta		Helsinki, Finland	Decision (split)	4	2:00
2009-01-31	Win	(Finland) Jouni Ahonen		Helsinki, Finland	Decision (unanimous)	3	2:00
2008-12-13	Loss	(Finland) Janne Herpola	Helsinki Thaiboxing Club Fight Event	Helsinki, Finland	Decision (unanimous)	3	2:00
2008-11-08	Win	(Finland) Pekka Österberg	Finnish Championship Qualifiers	Helsinki, Finland	Decision (split)	3	2:00
2008-05-24	Loss	(Finland) Mikko Tirronen		Helsinki, Finland	Decision (split)	3	2:00
2008-04-12	Loss	(Finland) Oskar Gruner	Combat Academy of Finland Fight Event	Helsinki, Finland	Decision (split)	3	2:00
2008-02-16	Win	(Finland) Johan Korlin	Finnish Championship Qualifiers	Helsinki, Finland	Decision (unanimous)	3	2:00
Legend: Win Loss Draw/no contest Notes

== Boxing record ==
Boxing record
2 wins (1 (T)KOs), 0 losses, 0 draws
Date	Result	Opponent	Event	Location	Method	Round	Time
September 27, 2025	Win	(Finland) Sebastian Johansson	F2F 2 - Return of The Legends	Helsinki, Finland	TKO	2	2:27
April 4, 2025	Win	(Finland) Petri Pyykönen	Didier Boxing 3	Riihimäki, Finland	Decision (unanimous)	4	3:00

== See also ==
- List of male kickboxers
