= Moldovan Football Federation =

Association football governing body of Moldova

UEFA
- Short name: FMF
- Founded: 14 April 1990; 35 years ago
- Headquarters: Chișinău
- FIFA affiliation: 1994
- UEFA affiliation: 1993
- President: Leonid Oleinicenco
- Website: fmf.md (in Romanian)

The Moldovan Football Federation (Romanian: Federația Moldovenească de Fotbal; FMF) is the governing body of football in Moldova. It oversees all national football competitions, including the top-tier Moldovan Liga. The federation organises the national team's football, futsal and beach soccer fixtures. It is based in Chișinău.

== Infrastructure ==
=== Football ===
Moldova national football team plays its official games at Zimbru Stadium which is privately held structure, but is under administration of FMF until 2026. The senior team, along with youth teams use Stadionul CPSM for training purposes. It is located in Vadul lui Vodă, a village along the Dniester River, approximately 25 kilometres from Chișinău.

=== Futsal ===
The FMF Futsal Arena, inaugurated in 2014, is a sports facility located in Ciorescu, 12 kilometres from Chișinău. Spanning 4,694.5 square meters, it features a multifunctional indoor arena, seating for 1,302 spectators, media facilities, electronic scoreboards, and comprehensive amenities. UEFA contributed 4.2 million euros to its construction.

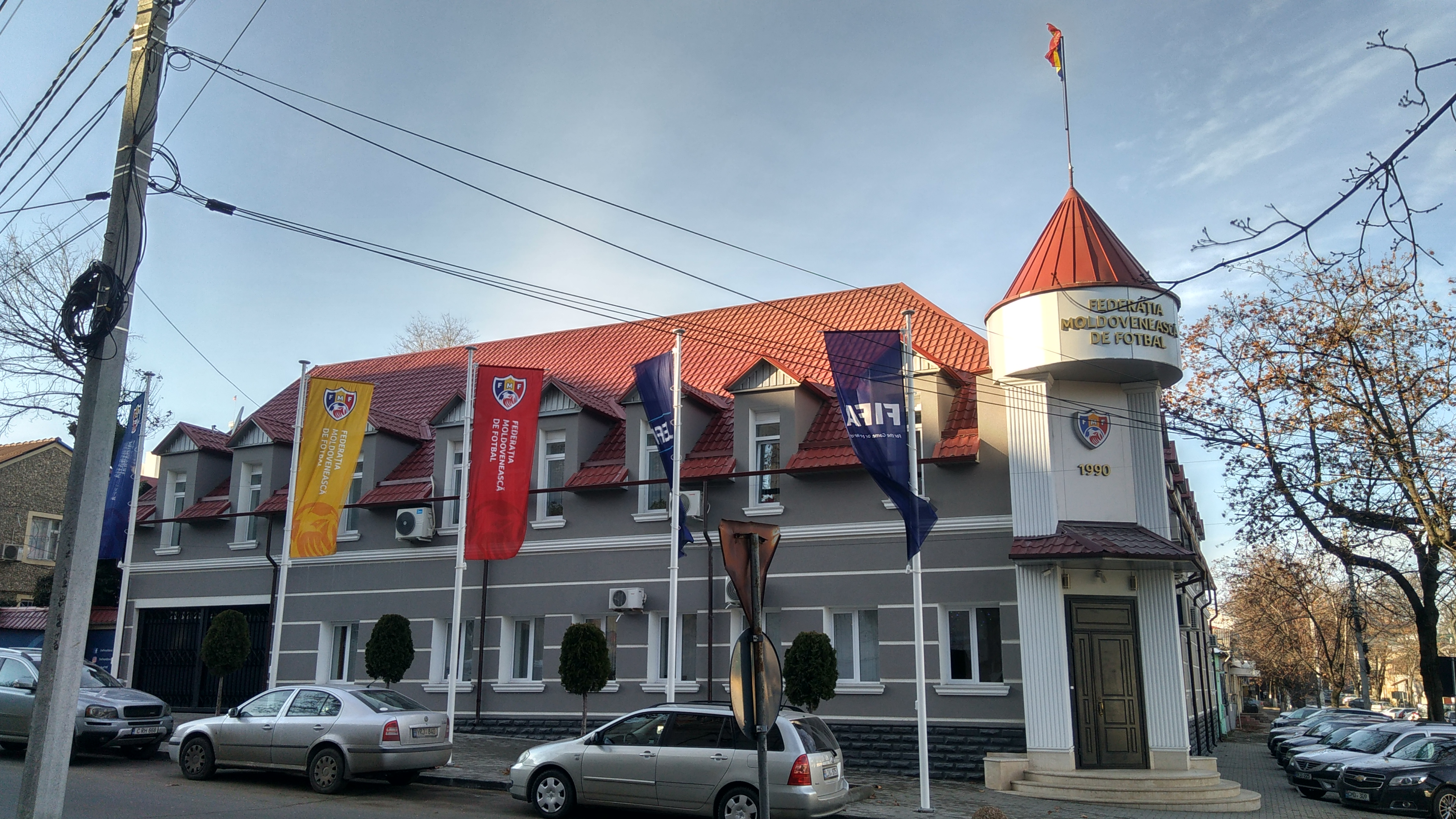
Headquarters in Chișinău

=== Beach soccer ===
The FMF Beach Soccer Arena is located in the La Izvor Park in the Sectorul Buiucani of Moldova's capital. The stadium was inaugurated in August 2020 and hosted games from the 2022 and 2024 Euro Beach Soccer League.

== Presidents ==
- Grigore Cușnir (1990–1991)
- Constantin Tampiza (1991–1995)
- Petru Comendant (1995–1996)
- Pavel Cebanu (1997–2019)
- Leonid Oleinicenco (2019–present)
