= Constantin Țuțu =

Moldovan Muay Thai kickboxer and K-1 fighter

- Born: Constantin Țuțu; 9 February 1987 (age 39); Băcioi, Moldavian SSR, Soviet Union
- Nationality: Moldovan
- Height: 1.80 m (5 ft 11 in)
- Weight: 95 kg (209 lb; 15.0 st)
- Division: Cruiserweight
- Style: Kickboxing, Muay Thai
- Fighting out of: Chișinău, Moldova
- Team: Champion Thai Gym
- Trainer: Nicanor Trocin

Kickboxing record
- Total: 32
- Wins: 29
- By knockout: 17
- Losses: 3

Other information
- University: State University of Physical Education and Sport

Member of the Moldovan Parliament
- In office 9 December 2014 – 9 March 2019
- Parliamentary group: Democratic Party

Personal details
- Citizenship: Moldova; Romania

Constantin Țuțu (born 9 February 1987) is a Moldovan former kickboxer and K-1 fighter who competed in the cruiserweight division. In 2012, he was ranked the #8 light heavyweight in the world by LiverKick.com. In December 2014, he became a member of the Parliament of Moldova under the Democratic Party of Moldova (PDM). In January 2026, he was sentenced to eight years in prison for influence peddling and fraud.

== Career ==
As of August 2014, Țuțu was widely considered the best sportsman in the country. In 2013, he won the Sportsman of the Year award.

He was nominated in the sports category of the "10 pentru Moldova" in 2014 and won the award.

In April 2014, he received an invitation to make his SUPERKOMBAT debut.

== Criminal cases ==
In 2012, Constantin Țuțu was involved in the murder of Alexei Veretco, for which Țuțu stood trial between 2013 and 2016, and was acquitted. Țuțu claimed he appeared at the site of the murder accidentally and shot "in the air" to calm down a situation before fleeing the scene. Constantin denounced his friend for 1.5 million euros and renegotiated his freedom with the authorities in Moldova in April 2020.

On 27 January 2026, Țuțu was sentenced to eight years in prison for influence peddling and fraud.

== Championships and awards ==
=== Kickboxing ===
- K-1
  - K-1 World Grand Prix 2013 in Moldova - Light Heavyweight Tournament Champion
- King of Kings
  - KOK World GP 2014 in Chișinău - Middleweight Tournament Champion
  - KOK World GP 2011 in Chișinău - Middleweight Tournament Champion
- Fighting & Entertainment Association
  - FEA World Middleweight Championship (One time)
  - FEA GP 2009 - Tournament Champion

== Kickboxing record ==
Professional kickboxing record
29 wins (17 KOs), 3 losses, 0 draws
Date	Result	Opponent	Event	Location	Method	Round
2015-12-20	Win	(Ukraine) Igor Lyapin	KOK World GP 2015	Chișinău, Moldova	Decision	3
2015-04-04	Win	(Latvia) Vitaly Buhryakov	KOK World GP 2015 Chisinau	Chișinău, Moldova	TKO	3
2014-09-19	Win	(Italy) Vittorio Iermano	KOK World GP 2014 in Chișinău - Featherweight Tournament, Super Fight	Chișinău, Moldova	KO (left high kick)	2
2014-03-22	Win	(Ukraine) Igor Lyapin	KOK World GP 2014 in Chișinău - Middleweight Tournament, Final	Chișinău, Moldova	KO	1
Wins the KOK tournament title.
2014-03-22	Win	(Turkey) Ali Alkayis	KOK World GP 2014 in Chișinău - Middleweight Tournament, Semi Finals	Chișinău, Moldova	TKO	2
2014-03-22	Win	(Poland) Radosław Paczuski	KOK World GP 2014 in Chișinău - Middleweight Tournament, Quarter Finals	Chișinău, Moldova	Decision (unanimous)	3
2013-12-14	Loss	(Morocco) Ibrahim El Bouni	KOK World Series: Eagles 12	Chișinău, Moldova	KO	1
2013-09-28	Win	(Belarus) Dmitry Shakuta	KOK World GP 2013 in Chișinău, Super Fight	Chișinău, Moldova	Extra round decision	4
2013-03-30	Win	(Netherlands) Leon Miedema	K-1 World Grand Prix 2013 in Moldova - Light Heavyweight Tournament, Final	Chișinău, Moldova	Decision	3
Wins the K-1 tournament title.
2013-03-30	Win	(Ukraine) Nikita Ciub	K-1 World Grand Prix 2013 in Moldova - Light Heavyweight Tournament, Semi Finals	Chișinău, Moldova	Decision (unanimous)	3
2013-03-30	Win	(Azerbaijan) Samir Kazimov	K-1 World Grand Prix 2013 in Moldova - Light Heavyweight Tournament, Quarter Finals	Chișinău, Moldova	KO	1
2012-12-15	Win	(Netherlands) Leon Miedema	Fighting Eagles 2012	Chișinău, Moldova	Decision (unanimous)	3
2012-09-29	Win	(Netherlands) Sem Braan	KOK World GP 2012 in Chișinău - Lightweight Tournament, Super Fight	Chișinău, Moldova	Decision	3
2011-12-10	Win	(Romania) Ciprian Bălaş	Fighting Eagles 2011	Chișinău, Moldova	KO	1
2011-10-01	Win	(Poland) Stanisław Zaniewski	KOK World GP 2011 in Chișinău - Middleweight Tournament, Final	Chișinău, Moldova	KO	1
Wins the KOK tournament title.
2011-10-01	Win	(Ukraine) Anatoly Shponarsky	KOK World GP 2011 in Chișinău - Middleweight Tournament, Semi Finals	Chișinău, Moldova	KO	2
2011-10-01	Win	(Romania) Sebastian Horeică	KOK World GP 2011 in Chișinău - Middleweight Tournament, Quarter Finals	Chișinău, Moldova	Decision	3
2011-04-16	Win	(Moldova) Alexandru Surcov	KOK Europe Grand Prix 2011	Chișinău, Moldova	Decision	3
Won FEA World Middleweight Championship.
2010-12-11	Loss	(Ukraine) Oleksandr Oliynyk	KOK World GP 2010 in Chișinău, Final	Chișinău, Moldova	KO	3
For the KOK tournament title.
2010-12-11	Win	(South Korea) Hong Tae Seong	KOK World GP 2010 in Chișinău, Semi Finals	Chișinău, Moldova	Decision	3
2010-12-11	Win	(Azerbaijan) Nahid Asanov	KOK World GP 2010 in Chișinău, Quarter Finals	Chișinău, Moldova	Decision	3
2010-10-09	Win	(Lithuania) Tadas Jonkus	FEA Bushido FC	Chișinău, Moldova	Decision	3
2010-03-19	Loss	(Lithuania) Tadas Jonkus	K-1 World Max 2010 - East European Tournament	Minsk, Belarus	Decision (split)	3
2009-12-16	Win	(Moldova) Nani Vadim	FEA GP 2009, Final	Chișinău, Moldova	KO	1
Wins the tournament title.
2009-12-16	Win	(Moldova) David Serghei	FEA GP 2009, Semi Finals	Chișinău, Moldova	KO	1
2009-12-16	Win	(Moldova) Pavel Doroftei	FEA GP 2009, Quarter Finals	Chișinău, Moldova	KO	1
Legend: Win Loss Draw/No contest Notes

== See also ==
- List of male kickboxers
