= 3rd Municipal Sportshall of Ano Liosia =

Indoor sporting arena in Ano Liosia, Attica Region, Greece

- Zofria Indoor Hall
- Interactive map of 3rd Municipal Sportshall of Ano Liosia
- Location: Ano Liosia, Greece
- Coordinates: 38.0691°N 23.6936°E
- Owner: Municipality of Fyli
- Capacity: 3,000 (1,300 permanent seats)
- Surface: Parquet

Construction
- Opened: 1998

Tenants
- AEK BC (2002–2004, 2011–2014)

The 3rd Municipal Sportshall of Ano Liosia, also known as Zofria Indoor Hall (Greek: Κλειστό Ζωφριάς), is an indoor sporting arena that is located in the Zofria district of Ano Liosia, Greece. The arena can be used to host volleyball and basketball games. The capacity of the arena for basketball games is 3,000, with 1,300 permanent seats.

== History ==
The arena hosted the 2000 CEV Cup Final Four. The Greek League club AEK Athens has also used the arena to host home games.
