= Pavel Cebanu =

Moldovan footballer

Personal information
- Date of birth: 28 March 1955 (age 71)
- Place of birth: Reni, Ukrainian SSR, Soviet Union
- Position: Midfielder

Youth career
- 1972: Lokomotiv Reni

Senior career*
Years	Team	Apps	(Gls)
1973–1985	Nistru Chişinău	341	(45)

Managerial career
- 1990: Nistru Chişinău
- 1992–1993: Amocom Chișinău
- 1993–1994: Olimpia Satu Mare
- 1994–1995: Codru Lozova
- 1994–1995: Speranța Nisporeni
- * Club domestic league appearances and goals

Pavel Cebanu (born 28 March 1955) is a former Moldovan football player who played as a midfielder. He spent his entire career, from 1973 to 1985, at the Moldovan side Nistru Chişinău. He was captain for many years and played 372 games scoring 46 goals.

He was the president of the Football Federation of Moldova, for 22 years from 1997 to 2019 and was succeeded by Leonid Oleinicenco.

In November 2003, to celebrate UEFA's Jubilee, he was selected as the Golden Player of Moldova by the Football Federation of Moldova as their most outstanding player of the past 50 years.

== Playing career ==
Cebanu played at his local team, Lokomotiv Reni. In 1972, after a match in the Chișinău-Odesa railway cup played in Chișinău, he was approached by Valentin Mirgorodschi, the manager of Nistru Chișinău. He transferred to the Sports School of Chișinău and played for the Moldovan team in the pupil's spartakiad of USSR. He was later invited to play for Nistru Chișinău.

In 1973 and 1974 Cebanu mostly played for the youth-reserve team of Nistru Chișinău. On 31 May 1974 he debuted in the Soviet Top League as substitute against CSKA Moskow. In the same year he scored 5 goals for the "second team" and one for the "first team". Beginning with 1975 he became a regular starter playing as a midfielder. He was nicknamed "Ze Maria" by the fans for his elegant and intelligent play. He was the team captain in 1978-1980 and 1982 and was chosen the Moldovan footballer of year in the same years. In the 1980 season Cebanu scored 12 goals, a personal best. He played his last match on 15 October 1985. During his career he was invited to play for many teams from the Soviet Top League, including Spartak Moscow, but he remained loyal to his team. He scored 46 goals in 372 matches in the Soviet Top League and Soviet Cup.

Cebanu represented the Moldavian SSR at the 1979 Spartakiad of USSR. He played in all qualification group matches and scored the winning goal in the match against the Turkmen SSR. Moldova placed third in the group and went to play in the consolation tournament, but it is unknown whether Cebanu played in this stage.

== Managerial career ==
Cebanu graduated the Moscow Higher School of Coaches and started his managerial career at Nistru Chişinău in 1990, which placed 7th in the Soviet First League. In the first season of the Moldovan National Division he coached the newly-formed Amocom Chișinău, which placed 5th, only below teams that played in USSR championships. In the 1993-94 season he managed Olimpia Satu Mare, becoming the first Moldovan to coach a Romanian team. The following season he coached both Codru Lozova, which placed last in Divizia A, and Speranța Nisporeni, which promoted to the Moldovan National Division. At the end of 1995 he retired from coaching to focus on his work at the Moldovan Football Federation.

== Later career ==
On 23 December 1995 Cebanu was appointed as general secretary of Moldovan Football Federation. On 1 February 1997 he elected president of the federation at the general assembly, a position for which he was re-elected 5 times. In 1998 the headquarters of MFF were open. In 2002 Stadionul CPSM was opened, which is used as a training hub for the national football teams. During his presidency "FMF Futsal Arena" was opened and a school for licensed coaches was created. He left the position on 22 April 2019.

In 2007 Cebanu was appointed vice-president of UEFA football committee. He also was a member of FIFA organisational committee for Under-17 World Cup.

== Personal life ==
Cebanu's son, Ilie is also a former footballer. His career as a goalkeeper spanned between 2003–2018, having also played for the Moldova national football team.

== Honours and awards ==
- USSR Master of Sports
- Order of Work Glory (2000)
- Golden Player of Moldova (2004)
- "Honoured Man" (Romanian: "Om Emerit") (2007)
- Order of Honour (2010)
- Order of Orthodox Church of Moldova "Good-faithul Voievode Stephen the Great and Saint" (Romanian: "Binecredinciosul Voievod Ștefan cel Mare și Sfânt”) of grade II (2010)
- Order of the Republic (2015)
