= Manej Sport Arena =

Coordinates: 47°1′57″N 28°51′24″E

- Manejul de Atletică Ușoară
- Interactive map of Manej Sport Arena
- Location: 26 Andrei Doga St., Chișinău, Moldova
- Owner: Ministry of Education and Research
- Capacity: -

Construction
- Opened: 1993

Tenant
- HC Riviera Chișinău

Website
- manej.md

Manej Sport Arena (Romanian: Manejul de Atletică Ușoară) is an indoor arena in Chișinău, Moldova.
