= ONE Fight Night 30 =

Combat sport events in 2025

ONE Fight Night 30: Kryklia vs. Knowles
- The poster for ONE Fight Night 30: Kryklia vs. Knowles
- Promotion: ONE Championship
- Date: April 5, 2025
- Venue: Lumpinee Boxing Stadium
- City: Bangkok, Thailand

Event chronology
ONE Friday Fights 103: Kulabdam vs. Çiçek	ONE Fight Night 30: Kryklia vs. Knowles	ONE Friday Fights 104: Chartpayak vs. Kompetch 2

ONE Fight Night 30: Kryklia vs. Knowles was a combat sports event produced by ONE Championship that took place on April 5, 2025, at Lumpinee Boxing Stadium in Bangkok, Thailand.

== Background ==
A ONE Heavyweight Muay Thai World Championship bout between current champion (also current ONE Light Heavyweight Kickboxing World champion) Roman Kryklia and promotional newcomer Lyndon Knowles headlined the event.

A ONE Lightweight Kickboxing World Championship trilogy between then champion (also a current ONE Lightweight Muay Thai World champion) Regian Eersel and former champion Alexis Nicolas served as the co-main event. The pairing previously met at ONE Fight Night 21 in April 2024, which Nicolas captured the title by unanimous decision. The second time met at ONE Fight Night 25 in October 2024, which Eersel capture back the title by unanimous decision. At the weigh-ins, Eersel failed the hydration test and came in at 170.5 pounds, 0.5 pounds over the lightweight limit. As a results, Eersel was stripped of the title and Nicolas was eligible to win it.

At the weigh-ins, two fighters failed to hydration test and missed weight for their respective fights:

- Mouhcine Chafi weighed in at 171.5 pounds, 1.5 pounds over the lightweight limit.
- Macarena Aragon weighed in at 116 pounds, 1 pounds over the atomweight limit.

== Results ==
Fight card (Amazon Prime Video)
Weight class				Method	Round	Time	Notes
Heavyweight Muay Thai	Roman Kryklia (c)	def.	Lyndon Knowles	KO (punch)	1	2:10	(Note: For the ONE Heavyweight Muay Thai World Championship.)
Lightweight Kickboxing	Regian Eersel	def.	Alexis Nicolas	Decision (majority)	5	3:00	(Note: For the vacant ONE Lightweight Kickboxing World Championship. Eersel missed weight (170.5 lb) and was stripped of the title, and Nicolas was eligible win the title.)
Featherweight Muay Thai	Nico Carrillo	def.	Sitthichai Sitsongpeenong	KO (punch to the body)	2	2:20
Catchweight (142 lbs) Muay Thai	Asa Ten Pow	def.	Saeksan Or. Kwanmuang	TKO (punch)	3	0:37
Flyweight	Sanzhar Zakirov	def.	Bokang Masunyane	Decision (unanimous)	3	5:00
Lightweight Muay Thai	George Jarvis	def.	Mouhcine Chafi	Decision (unanimous)	3	3:00	(Note: Chafi missed weight (171.5 lb).)
Heavyweight	Paul Elliott	def.	Ryugo Takeuchi	TKO (punches)	3	1:00
Featherweight Submission Grappling	Fabricio Andrey	def.	Ashley Williams	Decision (unanimous)	1	10:00
Strawweight Muay Thai	Elmehdi El Jamari	def.	Thongpoon P.K.Saenchai	KO (punches)	1	2:56
Women's Atomweight	Macarena Aragon	def.	Jihin Radzuan	Decision (unanimous)	3	5:00	(Note: Aragon missed weight (116 lb).)
Bantamweight	Carlo Bumina-ang	def.	Mauro Mastromarini	KO (punches)	1	2:45

== Bonus awards ==
The following fighters received $50,000 bonuses:

- Performance of the Night: Roman Kryklia and Nico Carrillo

== See also ==
- 2025 in ONE Championship
- List of ONE Championship events
- List of current ONE fighters
- ONE Championship Rankings
