= Rungrawee Sitsongpeenong =

Thai Muay Thai fighter

Rungrawee
- Born: Suthat Bunchit; 7 December 1995 (age 30); Ubon Ratchathani, Thailand
- Other names: Rungrawee KemMuaythaiGym; Rungrawee Kietpatharapan; Rungrawee P.K. Saenchaimuaythaigym
- Height: 179 cm (5 ft 10 1/2 in)
- Weight: 77 kg (170 lb; 12 st)
- Style: Muay Thai
- Stance: Southpaw
- Team: Sitsongpeenong (2020-Present); Kem MuayThai Gym (2018-2019); P.K.Saenchai (2014-2017)

Kickboxing record
- Total: 210
- Wins: 158
- Losses: 50
- Draws: 2

Medal record

Men's Muay Thai

Representing Thailand

IFMA World Championships
Gold medal – first place	2019 Bangkok	81 kg

Men's Pencak Silat

Pencak Silat World Championships
Gold medal – first place	2022 Malacca City	80 kg

Southeast Asian Games
Bronze medal – third place	2021 Hanoi	80 kg
Bronze medal – third place	2023 Phnom Penh	80 kg

Rungrawee Sitsongpeenong (Thai: รุ่งราวี ศิษย์สองพี่น้อง; born December 7, 1995) is a Thai Muay Thai fighter and kickboxer. He competes in the Lightweight division of ONE Championship. Rungrawee is the 2015 Isuzu Cup 70 kg Tournament winner, EM Legend 75 kg World Tournament winner, and 2020 EM Legend 77 kg Champion.

Outside of Muay Thai, he is a two-time bronze medalist in pencak silat at the 2021 and 2023 SEA Games in the men's 80 kg division.

== Biography and career ==
=== Early career ===
On February 8, 2014, Rungrawee travelled to France to participate in a 4-man tournament at La Nuit des Titans. In the semifinals he defeated Azize Hlali by decision before losing by technical knockout to Abdallah Mabel in the final.

Rungrawee won his first major title when he became the Isuzu Cup winner on February 28, 2015, defeating Detrit Sathian Gym by decision in the final.

On August 15, 2015, Rungrawee challenged Youssef Boughanem for his Omnoi Stadium middleweight title. He lost the fight by knockout due to an elbow strike in the third round.

Rungrawee defeated French champion Jimmy Vienot in France on March 18, 2017, at La Nuit Des Titans. He won the fight by decision.

=== EM Legend ===
Rungrawee made his debut for the Chinese promotion EM Legend on August 5, 2017, at EM Legend 22. He defeated Mohammad Ghaedibardeh by unanimous decision.

Rungrawee entered a 4-man 75 kg World tournament at EM Legend 23 on September 29, 2017. In the semifinal he defeated Huo Lihui by decision. He faced Islam Murtazaev final, he lost the fight by extension round split decision.

Rungrawee rematched Mohammad Ghaedibardeh on November 18, 2017, at EM Legend 25. He won the bout by majority decision.

On November 9, 2018, Rungrawee travelled to France to face Hamza Ngoto at Best of Siam 14. He lost the fight by decision.

Rungrawee was scheduled to face Bo Fufan for the EM Legend 77 kg title on January 5, 2020, at EM Legend 42. He won the fight by technical knockout in the second round.

=== ONE Championship ===
Rungrawee made his ONE Friday Fights debut on February 3, 2023, at ONE Friday Fights 3 where he defeated Mustafa Al Tekreeti by unanimous decision.

On May 5, 2023, Rungrawee defeated Vladimir Gabov by unanimous decision at ONE Friday Fights 15. Following this victory Rungrawee signed a multi-fight contract to compete on the main ONE Championship events.

As of June 2023 he was the #1 ranked 77 kg Muay Thai fighter in the world by the WBC and WMC. Combat press ranked him third and the WMO had him fifth.

Rungrawee was scheduled to face Liam Nolan on 5 August 2023, at ONE Fight Night 13. However, Nolan withdrew due to injury and was replaced by Nauzet Trujillo. Rungrawee missed weight and had to forfeit 25% of his purse to his opponent after negotiating for a 174 lbs catchweight. Rungrawee won the fight by unanimous decision.

Rungrawee faced Dmitry Menshikov, replacing Sinsamut Klinmee on September 30, 2023, at ONE Fight Night 14. He lost the fight via three knockdowns technical knockout in the first round.

Rungrawee faced Shakir Al-Tekreeti on January 13, 2024, at ONE Fight Night 18. He won the bout via TKO stoppage due to an elbow in the second round.

Rungrawee faced Bogdan Shumarov in a kickboxing bout on May 4, 2024, at ONE Fight Night 22. He won the fight via split decision.

== Personal life ==
Rungrawee is married and has a child.

== Titles and accomplishments ==
=== Muay Thai ===
- Siam Omnoi Stadium
  - 2015 Isuzu Cup Tournament Winner 70 kg
- International Federation of Muaythai Associations
  - 2019 IFMA World Championship 81 kg (gold)

=== Kickboxing ===
- EM Legend
  - 2017 EM Legend World 75 kg Tournament runner-up
  - 2020 EM Legend 77 kg Champion

=== Pencak silat ===
- Southeast Asian Games
  - 2023 SEA Games Pencak silat in Phnom Penh, Cambodia (bronze) -80 kg
  - 2021 SEA Games Pencak silat in Hanoi, Vietnam (bronze) -80 kg
- International Pencak Silat Federation
  - 2022 World Pencak Silat Championship in Malacca City, Malaysia (gold) -80 kg

== Fight record ==
Professional Muay Thai and Kickboxing Record
158 Wins, 50 Losses, 2 Draw, 0 No Contest
Date	Result	Opponent	Event	Location	Method	Round	Time
2026-11-27		(United Kingdom) Harry Purvis	ONE Friday Fights 180 & The Inner Circle 40	Bangkok, Thailand			
2026-06-27	Loss	(England) George Jarvis	ONE Fight Night 44	Bangkok, Thailand	KO (Left hook)	2	1:59
2026-04-10	Loss	(Suriname) Regian Eersel	ONE Friday Fights 150	Bangkok, Thailand	Decision (Unanimous)	5	3:00
For the vacant ONE Lightweight Kickboxing World Championship.
2025-08-02	Win	(Morocco) Youssef Assouik	ONE Fight Night 34	Bangkok, Thailand	Decision (Unanimous)	3	3:00
2024-11-01	Loss	(England) George Jarvis	ONE Friday Fights 85, Lumpinee Stadium	Bangkok, Thailand	KO (Elbow and Punches)	3	1:15
2024-05-04	Win	(Bulgaria) Bogdan Shumarov	ONE Fight Night 22	Bangkok, Thailand	Decision (Split)	3	3:00
2024-01-13	Win	(Iraq) Shakir Al-Tekreeti	ONE Fight Night 18	Bangkok, Thailand	TKO (Elbow)	2	1:44
2023-09-29	Loss	(Russia) Dmitry Menshikov	ONE Fight Night 14	Bangkok, Thailand	TKO (3 Knockdowns)	1	2:41
2023-08-04	Win	(Spain) Nauzet Trujillo	ONE Fight Night 13, Lumpinee Stadium	Bangkok, Thailand	Decision (Unanimous)	3	3:00
2023-05-05	Win	(Russia) Vladimir Gabov	ONE Friday Fights 15, Lumpinee Stadium	Bangkok, Thailand	Decision (Unanimous)	3	3:00
2023-02-03	Win	(Iraq) Mustafa Al Tekreeti	ONE Friday Fights 3, Lumpinee Stadium	Bangkok, Thailand	Decision (Unanimous)	3	3:00
2022-10-28	Win	(France) Moussa Tanega	Rajadamnern World Series	Bangkok, Thailand	TKO (Low kicks + punches)	2	1:51
2022-09-23	Win	(Iran) Keivan Soleimani	Rajadamnern World Series	Bangkok, Thailand	Decision (Unanimous)	3	3:00
2022-09-12	Win	(France) Johan Van De Hel	Muay Hardcore	Bangkok, Thailand	TKO (Doctor stoppage)	1	
2021-11-27	Win	(Sweden) Oliver Axelsson	Muay Hardcore	Bangkok, Thailand	KO (Right hook)	2	0:23
2020-01-05	Win	(China) Bo Fufan	EM Legend 42	Shanxi, China	TKO (Corner stoppage)	2	0:15
Wins the EM Legend -77kg title.
2019-08-17	Win	(Hungary) Patrik Vidakovics	EM Legend 38	Ankang, China	Decision (Unanimous)	3	3:00
2019-03-30	Win	(Belgium) Sinan Durmaz	EM Legend	Ziyang, China	KO (Low kick)	2	
2019-01-12	Win	(New Zealand) Brad Riddell	EM Legend 36	Shenzhen, China	Decision (Unanimous)	3	3:00
2018-11-09	Loss	(France) Hamza Ngoto	Best of Siam 14	Paris, France	Decision	5	3:00
2018-10-13	Win	(Brazil) Matheus Pereira	Topking World Series	Shandong, China	Decision (Unanimous)	3	3:00
2018-07-28	Loss	(New Zealand) Brad Riddell	EM Legend 32	Chengdu, China	Decision (Majority)	3	3:00
2018-06-16	Win	(France) Laurent Tevanee	Topking World Series	Surat Thani, Thailand	TKO (Elbow)	1	1:42
2018-05-26	Win	(Brazil) Matheus Pereira	Topking World Series	Bangkok, Thailand	TKO (Left cross)	2	
2018-04-21	Win	(New Zealand) Sosefo Falekaono	EM Legend 30	Emei, China	KO (High kick)	1	1:30
2018-01-20	Win	(China) Huang Zhenyou	EM Legend 27	Kunming, China	Decision (Unanimous)	3	3:00
2017-11-18	Win	(Iran) Mohammad Ghaedibardeh	EM Legend 25	Sandu, China	Decision (Majority)	3	3:00
2017-09-29	Loss	(Russia) Islam Murtazaev	EM Legend 23, World Tournament Final	Yilong, China	Ext.R Decision (Split)	4	3:00
For the EM Legend World -75kg Tournament title.
2017-09-29	Win	(China) Huo Lihui	EM Legend 23, World Tournament Semifinal	Yilong, China	TKO (Doctor stoppage)	2	
2017-08-05	Win	(Iran) Mohammad Ghaedibardeh	EM Legend 22	Su-ngai Kolok, Thailand	KO (left body shot)	2	2:10
2017-07-01	Win	(France) Malik Aliane	Chook Muay	Évian-les-Bains, France	Decision	5	3:00
2017-05-17	Win	(Uzbekistan) Ruslan Ataev	Topking World Series	Wuhan, China	KO (Middle kick)	2	
2017-03-18	Win	(France) Jimmy Vienot	La Nuit Des Titans	Tours, France	Decision	5	3:00
2017-02-10	Win	(Morocco) Ilyass Chakir	Muay Xtreme	Bangkok, Thailand	Decision	3	3:00
2017-01-06	Win	(Belgium) Kendal Karakurt	Muay Xtreme	Bangkok, Thailand	KO (Elbow)	2	1:04
2017-12-02	Win	(Argentina) Brian Allevato	Muay Xtreme	Bangkok, Thailand	TKO (Doctor stoppage)	1	
2015-11-21	Loss	(Morocco) Youssef Boughanem	THAI FIGHT RPCA	Nakhon Pathom, Thailand	Decision	3	3:00
2015-08-15	Loss	(Morocco) Youssef Boughanem	Omnoi Stadium	Bangkok, Thailand	KO (Elbow)	3	
For the Omnoi Stadium Middleweight (160 lbs) title.
2015-05-16	Loss	(Thailand) Thongchai Sitsongpeenong		Thailand	Decision	5	3:00
2015-04-04	Loss	(Thailand) Tengnueng Sitjaesairoong	THAI FIGHT CRMA	Nakhon Nayok, Thailand	Decision	3	3:00
2015-02-28	Win	(Thailand) Detrit Sathian Gym	Omnoi Stadium - Isuzu Cup, Final	Samut Sakhon, Thailand	Decision	5	3:00
Wins the 2015 Isuzu Cup.
2015-01-17	Win	(Thailand) Wanchalerm Uddonmuang	Omnoi Stadium - Isuzu Cup, Semifinal	Samut Sakhon, Thailand	Decision	5	3:00
2014-11-29	Win	(Thailand) Changpuek MuayThaiAcademy	Omnoi Stadium - Isuzu Cup, Group Stage	Samut Sakhon, Thailand	Decision	5	3:00
2014-10-11	Win	(Thailand) Kongnakornban Sor.Kitrungroj	Omnoi Stadium - Isuzu Cup, Group Stage	Samut Sakhon, Thailand	Decision	5	3:00
2014-08-23	Loss	(Thailand) Detrit Sathian Gym	Omnoi Stadium - Isuzu Cup, Group Stage	Samut Sakhon, Thailand	Decision	5	3:00
2014-02-08	Loss	(France) Abdallah Mabel	La Nuit des Titans, Final	Tours, France	TKO (3 Knockdowns)	2	
2014-02-08	Win	(France) Azize Hlali	La Nuit des Titans, Semifinal	Tours, France	Decision	3	3:00
2013-11-15	Win	(France) Mohamed Houmer	Muaythai League	Paris, France	TKO	4	
Legend: Win Loss Draw/No contest Notes

Amateur Muay Thai record
Date	Result	Opponent	Event	Location	Method	Round	Time
2019-07-28	Win	(Belarus) Mikita Shostak	2019 IFMA World Championship, Final	Bangkok, Thailand	Decision (29:28)	3	3:00
Wins 2019 IFMA World Championship -81kg Gold Medal.
2019-07-26	Win	(Ukraine) Vasyl Sorokin	2019 IFMA World Championship, Semifinal	Bangkok, Thailand	Decision (29:28)	3	3:00
2019-07-25	Win	(North Macedonia) Boban Ilioski	2019 IFMA World Championship, Quarterfinal	Bangkok, Thailand	Decision (30:27)	3	3:00
2019-07-24	Win	(Sweden) Christopher Bajo	2019 IFMA World Championship, Second Round	Bangkok, Thailand	Decision (30:27)	3	3:00
Legend: Win Loss Draw/No contest Notes
