= Youssef Assouik =

Danish Moroccan Muay Thai fighter (born 1994)

- Born: December 4, 1994 (age 31); Copenhagen, Denmark
- Nationality: Danish; Moroccan
- Height: 1.90 m (6 ft 3 in)
- Weight: 72.5 kg (160 lb; 11 st)
- Style: Muay Thai
- Fighting out of: Copenhagen, Denmark
- Team: Assouik Gym (2020-Present); Siam Athlete Nation (former)
- Trainer: Philip Schmidt
- Years active: 2009-present

Kickboxing record
- Total: 32
- Wins: 28
- By knockout: 9
- Losses: 4
- By knockout: 1
- Draws: 0

Youssef Assouik is a Danish-Moroccan Muay Thai kickboxer. He is the reigning WMC World Middleweight Champion.

== Biography and career ==
=== Early career ===
Assouik grew up in Copenhagen where he ran into troubles until the age of 15 when he discovered Muay Thai. With a new sense of discipline, he focused on training and became a multiple time Danish amateur champion as well as a Nordic, European and World champion in the Junior categories of the IFMA. He also is a social worker with the youth of his city.

Assouik turned professional in 2014 training out of the SIAM Athlete Nation gym in Copenhagen. After a year of competition, he won the WKN Scandinavia K-1 64.4 kg title by stopping Jonas Berglund on October 17, 2015.

On December 19, 2015, Assouik travelled to Russia to face Aleksei Ulianov for the WKN Oriental rules International 66.7 kg title. He won the fight by doctor stoppage in the first round.

Assouik made his Glory promotion debut at Glory 29: Copenhagen against Nasim Kazem. He won the fight by decision.

On August 6, 2016, Assouik suffered his first defeat as a professional when he travelled to Changzhi, China to face Tie Yinghua at Glory of Heroes 4. He lost the bout by unanimous decision.

For his second fight with the Glory promotion Assouik faced Abdou Karim Chorr at Glory 40: Copenhagen on April 29, 2017. He won the bout by unanimous decision. Assouik's Glory run came to an end on May 20, 2017, when he faced Tyjani Beztati at Glory: 41 Holland. He lost the fight by unanimous decision.

=== World Champion ===
Assouik was scheduled to face Maikel Garcia for the vacant ISKA K-1 world -72.5 kg belt at Siam Warriors IV in Denmark. He won the fight by unanimous decision after five rounds to capture his first world title. He successfully defended his title on May 5, 2018, against Jose Bello at Enfusion 66 in Tenerife, winning the fight by unanimous decision.

Throughout 2018 Assouik took part in the K-1 rules Tatneft Cup in the 70 kg division happening in Kazan, Russia. After winning his first two fights he faced Oleg Likthorovich in the semi-finals on October 27. He won by extension round decision to qualify for the final. The 2018 Tatneft Cup Finals happened on December 7 and saw Assouik defeat Vladislav Ukrainetshe by extension round decision and win the title.

Assouik went back to muay thai rules on February 2, 2019, when he faced Valentin Thibaut for the vacant WBC Muay Thai intercontinental 154 lbs title at Siam Warriors V. He lost the fight by doctor stoppage due to a cut from an elbow strike.

After two years without a fight due to the COVID-19 pandemic Assouik came back to competition now fighting out of his own gym. He defended his K-1 world title on his own promotion called Assouik Fight Night against Karim Guettaf on November 13, 2021. He won the fight by knockout in the first round. He made a third successful defense of his title when he knocked out Panagiotis Mitsinigkos in the first round with a knee on October 15, 2022.

On December 10, 2022, Assouik faced Nicolas Mendes at Muay Thai For Life 4.0 in Sweden for the WMC European 168 lbs title. He won the fight by unanimous decision.

This win allowed him to challenge for the world version of the title he just obtained. On March 18, 2023, in Nice, France he defeated Jimmy Vienot by unanimous decision for the WMC World 160 lbs title, becoming a world champion in muay thai rules as a professional for the first time.

=== ONE Championship ===
Assouik made his promotional debut against Sinsamut Klinmee on October 5, 2024, at ONE Fight Night 25. He won the fight via unanimous decision.

== Titles and accomplishments ==
=== Amateur ===
- International Federation of Muaythai Associations
  - 2011 IFMA World Muaythai Championships Junior -60 kg (bronze)
  - 2012 IFMA European Muaythai Championships Junior -60 kg (silver)
  - 2012 IFMA Nordic Muaythai Championships Junior -60 kg (gold)
  - 2012 IFMA World Muaythai Championships Junior -60 kg (gold)
  - 2013 IFMA Nordic Muaythai Championships -63,5 kg (gold)
  - 2022 IFMA World Muaythai Championships -75 kg (gold)
  - 2023 IFMA Arab Muaythai Championships -75 kg (gold)

=== Professional ===
- Tatneft Cup
  - 2018 Tatneft Cup -70 kg Champion
- International Sport Karate Association
  - 2016 ISKA European Muay Thai 67 kg Champion
  - 2017 ISKA World K-1 light-middleweight (72.5 kg) Champion
    - Four successful title defenses
- World Kickboxing Network
  - 2015 WKN Scandinavia K-1 64.4 kg Champion
  - 2015 WKN Oriental rules International 66.7 kg Champion
- World Muay Thai Council
  - 2022 WMC European Super Middleweight (168 lbs) Champion
  - 2023 WMC World Middleweight (160 lbs) Champion

== Kickboxing and Muay Thai record ==
Professional Kickboxing and Muay Thai record
28 Wins (9 (T)KOs), 4 Losses
Date	Result	Opponent	Event	Location	Method	Round	Time
2025-08-02	Loss	(Thailand) Rungrawee Sitsongpeenong	ONE Fight Night 34	Bangkok, Thailand	Decision (Unanimous)	3	3:00
2024-10-05	Win	(Thailand) Sinsamut Klinmee	ONE Fight Night 25	Bangkok, Thailand	Decision (Unanimous)	3	3:00
2024-05-25	Win	(Sweden) Anton Sjöqvist	Muay Thai For Life 8.0	Gothenburg, Sweden	TKO	1	
2023-11-24	Win	(Spain) Ayoub Benadya	Assouik Fight Night	Copenhagen, Denmark	Decision (Unanimous)	5	3:00
Defends ISKA World K-1 light-middleweight (72.5kg) title.
2023-03-18	Win	(France) Jimmy Vienot	Nice Fight Night 10	Nice, France	Decision (Unanimous)	5	3:00
Wins the WMC World Middleweight (160 lbs) title.
2022-12-10	Win	(Spain) Nicolas Mendes	Muay Thai For Life 4.0	Malmö, Sweden	Decision (Unanimous)	5	3:00
Wins the WMC European super-middleweight (168 lbs) title.
2022-10-15	Win	(Greece) Panagiotis Mitsinigkos	Assouik Fight Night 2	Copenhagen, Denmark	KO (Knee)	1	2:00
Defends ISKA World K-1 light-middleweight (72.5kg) title.
2022-09-10	Win	(Sweden) Magnus Andersson	Muay Thai For Life 3.0	Gothenburg, Sweden	Decision (Unanimous)	3	3:00
2021-11-13	Win	(France) Karim Guettaf	Assouik Fight Night	Frederiksberg, Denmark	KO (High kick)	1	2:50
Defends ISKA World K-1 light-middleweight (72.5kg) title.
2019-10-26	Win	(France) Omar Samb	Le Choc des Guerriers	L'Isle-d'Espagnac, France	Decision	5	3:00
2019-08-31	Win	(Thailand)		Bangkok, Thailand	Decision	5	3:00
2019-02-02	Loss	(France) Valentin Thibaut	Siam Warriors V	København, Denmark	TKO (Doctor stoppage/cut)	3	
For the WBC Muay Thai Intercontinental 154 lbs title.
2018-12-07	Win	(Russia) Vladislav Ukrainets	2018 Tatneft Cup, Final	Kazan, Russia	Ext.R Decision	4	3:00
Wins 2018 Tatneft Cup -70kg title.
2018-10-27	Win	(Belarus) Oleg Likthorovich	2018 Tatneft Cup, Semi Final	Kazan, Russia	Ext.R Decision	4	3:00
2018-08-24	Win	(Russia) Rustam Bazarov	2018 Tatneft Cup, Quarter Final	Kazan, Russia	Points (rd.3 knockdown)	3	3:00
2018-05-31	Win	(Uzbekistan) Muslimbek Omonov	2018 Tatneft Cup, 1/8 Final	Kazan, Russia	Points (rd.1 knockdown)	3	3:00
2018-05-05	Win	(Spain) Jose Bello	Enfusion Live 66	Tenerife, Spain	Decision (Unanimous)	5	3:00
Defends the ISKA World K-1 light-middleweight (72.5kg) title.
2017-11-25	Win	(Spain) Maikel Garcia	Siam Warriors IV	Frederiksberg, Denmark	Decision (Unanimous)	5	3:00
Wins the ISKA World K-1 light-middleweight (72.5kg) title.
2017-05-20	Loss	(Morocco) Tyjani Beztati	Glory: 41 Holland	Den Bosch, Netherlands	Decision (Unanimous)	3	3:00
2017-04-29	Win	(Sweden) Abdou Karim Chorr	Glory 40: Copenhagen	Copenhagen, Denmark	Decision (unanimous)	3	3:00
2016-11-05	Win	(Greece) Giannis Skordilis	Honour of the Ring	Aarhus, Denmark	TKO (three knockdowns)	3	
2016-08-06	Loss	(China) Tie Yinghua	Glory of Heroes 4	Changzhi, China	Decision (Unanimous)	3	3:00
2016-04-16	Win	(Sweden) Nasim Kazem	Glory 29: Copenhagen	Copenhagen, Denmark	Decision (unanimous)	3	3:00
2016-02-20	Win	(Portugal) Luis Passos	Siam Warriors	Copenhagen, Denmark	Decision (Unanimous)	5	3:00
Wins the ISKA European Muay Thai -67kg title.
2015-12-19	Win	(Russia) Aleksei Ulianov	Muay Thai Moscow	Samara, Russia	TKO (Doctor stoppage/cut)	1	2:10
Wins the WKN Oriental rules International 66.7kg title.
2015-10-17	Win	(Sweden) Jonas Berglund	Simply the Best 8 - WKN	Sweden	TKO (injury)	3	
Wins the WKN Scandinavian K-1 64.4kg title.
2015-06-13	Win	(Germany) Maurice Lohner	Tag des Triumphes	Hamburg, Germany	Decision (Unanimous)	5	3:00
Wins the W.F.C.A European title.
2015-03-28	Win	(Netherlands) Charafeddine Allioui	Golden Thaiboxing	Roskilde, Denmark	TKO	1	
2014-12-04	Win	(Thailand)		Bangkok, Thailand	KO (Left cross)	1	
2014-10-11	Win	(Denmark) Mikkel Lund	Honour of the Ring 2	Aarhus, Denmark	TKO (Doctor stoppage)	4	
2014-09-20	Win	(Sweden) Kim Falk	Battle Of Lund 6	Lund, Sweden	Decision (Unanimous)	3	3:00
2014-06-07	Win	(Sweden) Jonas Berglund		Stockholm, Sweden	Decision		
Legend: Win Loss Draw/No contest Notes

Amateur Muay Thai Record
Date	Result	Opponent	Event	Location	Method	Round	Time
2023-05-08	Loss	(Russia) Magomed Magomedov	IFMA Senior World Championships 2023, Quarter Final	Bangkok, Thailand	Decision (29:28)	3	3:00
2023-05-07	Win	(Belarus) Pavel Hryshanovich	IFMA Senior World Championships 2023, Second Round	Bangkok, Thailand	Decision (30:27)	3	3:00
2023-03-05	Win	(Tunisia) Skik Souhaib	2023 Arab Muaythai Championships, Final	Abu Dhabi, United Arab Emirates	TKO	2	
Wins 2023 Arab Muaythai Championships -75kg Gold Medal.
2023-03-04	Win	(Lebanon) Hicham Sarraj	2023 Arab Muaythai Championships, Semi Final	Abu Dhabi, United Arab Emirates	TKO	1	
2023-03-03	Win	(Palestine) Hussien Alali	2023 Arab Muaythai Championships, Quarter Final	Abu Dhabi, United Arab Emirates	TKO	1	
2022-06-02	Win	(Hungary) Zoltan Nardelotti	IFMA World Championships 2022, Final	Abu Dhabi, United Arab Emirates	Decision (30:27)	3	3:00
Wins 2022 IFMA World Championships -75kg Gold Medal.
2022-06-02	Win	(United Kingdom) Liam Nolan	IFMA World Championships 2022, Semi Finals	Abu Dhabi, United Arab Emirates	Decision (29:28)	3	3:00
2022-05-31	Win	(Germany) Andre Stephan	IFMA World Championships 2022, Quarter Finals	Abu Dhabi, United Arab Emirates	Walk over		
2022-05-30	Win	(Sweden) Dalian Dawody	IFMA World Championships 2022, Second Round	Abu Dhabi, United Arab Emirates	TKO	2	
2013-08-24	Win	(Finland) Kari Viinikainen	IFMA Nordic Championships 2013, Final	Denmark	Decision	3	3:00
Wins 2012 IFMA Nordic Championships -63,5kg title.
2013-08-23	Win	(Sweden) Samuel Bark	IFMA Nordic Championships 2013, Semi Final	Denmark	Decision	3	3:00
2012-11-10	Win	(Canada) Carlton Lieu	Siam Warriors	Copenhagen, Denmark	Decision	5	2:00
2012-09-12	Win	(Russia) Magomed Amirkhanov	IFMA World Championships 2012, Final	Saint-Petersburg, Russia	Decision	4	2:00
Wins 2012 IFMA World Championships Junior -60kg Gold Medal.
2012-09-11	Win	(Kazakhstan) Sembek Raimbek	IFMA World Championships 2012, Semi Final	Saint-Petersburg, Russia	Decision	4	2:00
2012-05-26	Win	(Sweden) Kamran Salman	Battle of Lund	Sweden	TKO (corner stoppage)		
2012-04-	Loss	(Russia) Magomed Amirkhanov	IFMA European Championships 2011, Final	Antalya, Turkey	Decision	4	2:00
Wins 2012 IFMA European Championships Junior -60kg Silver Medal.
2011-09-	Loss	(Russia) Zakorga Zubairov	2011 IFMA World Championships, Semi Final	Tashkent, Uzbekistan	Decision	4	2:00
Wins 2011 IFMA World Championships Junior -60kg Bronze Medal.
2011-09-	Win	(Belarus) Vadim Vaskov	2011 IFMA World Championships, Quarter Final	Tashkent, Uzbekistan	Decision	4	2:00
Legend: Win Loss Draw/No contest Notes

== See also ==
- List of male kickboxers
