= Mikita Shostak =

Belarusian kickboxer (born 1998)

- Born: Никита Шостак; April 7, 1998 (age 28); Lahoysk, Belarus
- Nationality: Belarus
- Height: 185 cm (6 ft 1 in)
- Weight: 90 kg (200 lb; 14 st)
- Division: Light Heavyweight
- Reach: 188 cm (74 in)
- Style: Kickboxing, Muay Thai
- Stance: Southpaw
- Team: BULAT GYM-VAREC TEAM
- Years active: 2018–present

Kickboxing record
- Total: 20
- Wins: 17
- By knockout: 3
- Losses: 3
- By knockout: 1

Mikita Shostak (born April 7, 1998) is a Belarusian Muay Thai and kickboxer. As of November 2023, he was ranked as the tenth-best light heavyweight kickboxer in the world by Beyond Kick.

== Career ==
On October 12, 2018, Shostak faced Liu Ce at Glory of Heroes 35: Meishan. He won the fight by unanimous decision.

On August 6, 2020, Shostak won a four-man tournament at BFC 58. In the final, he defeated Surik Magakyan by unanimous decision.

Shostak was scheduled to fight Sher Mamazulunov as the co-main event of Fair Fight XIV on March 6, 2021. He lost the fight by unanimous decision.

On July 28, 2023, Shostak faced Valeriy Bizyaev at RCC 16. He won the fight by unanimous decision.

On November 18, 2023, Shostak defeated Aleksandr Malafeev by second-round high kick knockout at a REN TV event.

== Championship and accomplishments ==
=== Amateur ===
- World Games
  - (bronze) Muaythai at the 2017 World Games (-81 kg)
- International Federation of Muaythai Associations
  - (gold) 2017 IFMA European Muaythai Championships (-81 kg)
  - (silver) 2018 FISU World University Championship (-81 kg)
  - (silver) 2019 IFMA World Muaythai Championships (-81 kg)
  - (silver) 2019 IFMA European Muaythai Championships (-81 kg)
- World Association of Kickboxing Organizations
  - (gold) 2019 WAKO World K-1 Grand Prix (-86 kg)

=== Professional ===
- Belarusian Fight Championship
  - 2020 BFC Light Heavyweight Tournament Winner
  - 2020 BFC Light Heavyweight Championship

== Fight record ==
Professional record
17 Wins (3 (T)KO's), 3 Losses, 0 Draws, 0 No Contests
Date	Result	Opponent	Event	Location	Method	Round	Time
2023-11-18	Win	(Russia) Aleksandr Malafeev	REN TV	Sochi, Russia	KO (High kick)	2	1:23
2023-07-28	Win	(Russia) Valeriy Bizyaev	RCC 16	Yekaterinburg, Russia	Decision (Unanimous)	3	3:00
2023-05-25	Loss	(Russia) Vladislav Revutskii	Modern Fighting Pankration 240	Moscow, Russia	TKO (Punches)	2	1:00
2022-12-02	Win	(Moldova) Adam Kiritsa	Rage Arena 7	Moscow, Russia	KO (Right hook)	1	2:08
2022-10-29	Win	(Russia) Salawat Rahimzanov	Rage Arena 6	Moscow, Russia	Decision (Unanimous)	3	3:00
2022-08-23	Win	(Russia) Andrey Lobanov	Rage Arena 4	Moscow, Russia	Decision (Unanimous)	3	3:00
2022-04-22	Win	(Russia) Armen Karpetyan	Rage Arena 3	Moscow, Russia	KO (Right hook)	2	2:28
2021-11-13	Win	(Ukraine) Oleksii Vershynin	FEA Keep Grinding 2	Chișinău, Moldova	Ext. R. Decision (Unanimous)	4	3:00
2021-03-26	Win	(United Arab Emirates) Ilyass Habibali	K-1 Royal Battle	Abu Dhabi, United Arab Emirates	Decision (Unanimous)	3	3:00
2021-03-06	Loss	(Uzbekistan) Sher Mamazulunov	Fair Fight XIV	Yekaterinburg, Russia	Decision (Unanimous)	3	3:00
2020-08-06	Win	(Russia) Surik Magakyan	BFC 58, Tournament Final	Minsk, Belarus	Decision (Unanimous)	3	3:00
Wins the BFC Light Heavyweight Tournament title.
2020-08-06	Win	(Belarus) Evgeny Volchek	BFC 58, Tournament Semifinal	Minsk, Belarus	Decision (Unanimous)	3	3:00
2020-06-25	Win	(Belarus) Evgeny Volchek	BFC 55	Minsk, Belarus	Decision (Unanimous)	3	3:00
2019-04-26	Loss	(Poland) Maksymilian Bratkowicz	DSF 22: Road of the Warrior	Nowy Sacz, Poland	Decision (Unanimous)	3	3:00
2019-01-12	Win	(China) Liu Mingzhi	EM Legend 36	Shenzhen, China	Decision (Unanimous)	3	3:00
2018-12-08	Win	(Poland) Dawid Mirkowski	DSF 18	Ząbki, Poland	Decision (Unanimous)	3	3:00
2018-10-12	Win	(China) Liu Ce	Glory of Heroes 35: Meishan	Sichuan, China	Decision (Unanimous)	3	3:00
2018-03-24	Win	(Slovakia) Daniel Hromek	Hanuman Cup 37	Bratislava, Slovakia	Decision (Unanimous)	3	3:00
Legend: Win Loss Draw/No contest Notes

Amateur record
Date	Result	Opponent	Event	Location	Method	Round	Time
2019-11-10	Loss	(Ukraine) Vasyl Sorokin	2019 IFMA European Muaythai Championships, Tournament Final	Minsk, Belarus	Decision (Unanimous)	3	3:00
Wins the IFMA European Muaythai Championships Silver Medal (-81 kg).
2019-11-08	Win	(France) Bilal Bakhouche-Chareuf	2019 IFMA European Muaythai Championships, Tournament Semifinal	Minsk, Belarus	Decision (Unanimous)	3	3:00
2019-09-27	Win	(Russia) Sergey Ponomarev	2019 WAKO K-1 World Grand Prix, Tournament Final	Prague, Czech Republic	Decision (Split)	3	3:00
Wins the WAKO World Grand Prix Gold Medal (-86 kg).
2019-09-25	Win	(Russia) Nikita Kozlov	2019 WAKO K-1 World Grand Prix, Tournament Semifinal	Prague, Czech Republic	Decision (Unanimous)	3	3:00
2019-07-28	Loss	(Thailand) Suthat Bunchit	2019 IFMA World Muaythai Championships, Tournament Final	Bangkok, Thailand	Decision (Unanimous)	3	3:00
Wins the IFMA World Muaythai Championships Silver Medal (-81 kg).
2019-07-26	Win	(Russia) Surik Magakyan	2019 IFMA World Muaythai Championships, Tournament Final	Bangkok, Thailand	Decision (Unanimous)	3	3:00
2018-07-29	Loss	(Turkey) Ali Dogan	2018 FISU World University Championships, Tournament Final	Pattaya, Thailand	Decision	3	3:00
Wins the FISU World University Muaythai Championships Silver Medal (-81 kg).
2018-07-27	Win	(France) Bilal Bakhouche-Chareuf	2018 FISU World University Championships, Tournament Semifinals	Pattaya, Thailand	TKO (leg injury)	3	
2018-05-12	Loss	(Turkey) Ali Dogan	2018 IFMA World Muaythai Championships, Tournament First Round	Cancún, Mexico	Decision (Unanimous)	3	3:00
2017-10-19	Win	(Russia) Nadir Iskhakov	2017 IFMA European Muaythai Championships, Tournament Final	Paris, France	Decision (Unanimous)	3	3:00
Wins the IFMA European Muaythai Championships Gold Medal (-81 kg).
2017-10-17	Win	(Sweden) Johan Andersson	2017 IFMA European Muaythai Championships, Tournament Semifinal	Paris, France	Decision (Unanimous)	3	3:00
2017-10-15	Win	(Sweden) Oskar Mosberg	2017 IFMA European Muaythai Championships, Tournament Quarterfinal	Paris, France	Decision (Unanimous)	3	3:00
2017-07-28	Win	(Poland) Rafal Korczak	2017 World Games, Tournament Bronze Medal Match	Wrocław, Poland	TKO (Walkover)	3	3:00
Wins the 2017 World Games Bronze Medal (-81 kg).
2017-07-29	Loss	(Sweden) Constantino Nanga	2017 World Games, Tournament Semifinal	Wrocław, Poland	Decision (Unanimous)	3	3:00
2017-07-28	Win	(Iran) Saki Ayoob	2017 World Games, Tournament Quarterfinal	Wrocław, Poland	Decision (Unanimous)	3	3:00
Legend: Win Loss Draw/No contest Notes

== See also ==
- List of male kickboxers
