= Valeriy Bizyaev =

Japanese kickboxer

- Born: Валерий Бизяев; 3 June 1998 (age 28); Solikamsk, Russia
- Nationality: Russian
- Height: 193 cm (6 ft 4 in)
- Weight: 95 kg (209 lb; 15.0 st)
- Division: Heavyweight
- Style: Kickboxing
- Stance: Orthodox
- Fighting out of: Perm, Russia
- Years active: 2016–present

Kickboxing record
- Total: 28
- Wins: 19
- By knockout: 5
- Losses: 8
- By knockout: 0
- Draws: 1

Valeriy Bizyaev (born June 3, 1998) is a Russian kickboxer. As of April 2023, he is ranked as the tenth best light heavyweight kickboxer in the world by Beyond Kick.

== Kickboxing career ==
Bizyaev faced Florent Kaouachi in the opening round of the 2019 Tatneft Cup +80 kg tournament, held on June 11, 2019. He won the fight by unanimous decision. Advancing to the tournament quarterfinals, Bizyaev faced Claudiu Istrate on July 19, 2019. He lost the fight by decision, after being knocked down by Istrate in the first round.

Bizyaev faced Usman Yakhyaev at a November 28, 2020, Fair Fight event. He won the fight by a second-round technical knockout. The referee was forced to wave the fight off, as Yakhyaev was unsteady on his feet following a knockdown.

Bizyaev faced Nadir Ghadjiev in the penultimate bout of the Tatneft Cup +80 kg tournament on December 13, 2021. He won the fight by decision. Bizyaev advanced to the tournament finals, where the faced the Glory veteran Jhonata Diniz. He lost the fight by a first-round knockout, after being floored with a left hook.

Bizyaev faced Enes Ilben at Ural FC 1 on July 1, 2022. He won the fight by a first-round knockout. Bizyaev next faced Ariel Machado for the inaugural Ural FC Light Heavyweight K-1 title at Ural FC 2 on March 25, 2023. He won the fight by a second-round knockout.

On July 28, 2023, Bizyaev faced Mikita Shostak at RCC 16. He lost the fight by unanimous decision.

Bizyaev made his first Ural FC Light Heavyweight (-90 kg) K-1 title defense against Boubaker El Bakouri at Ural FC 4 on October 20, 2023. He retained the title by unanimous decision.

Bizyaev faced Iuri Fernandes at Ural FC 8 on October 16, 2024. He lost the fight by unanimous decision.

== Championships and accomplishments ==
=== Professional ===
- Tatneft Cup
  - 2021 Tatneft Cup Heavyweight (+80 kg) Tournament runner-up
- Ural FC
  - 2023 Ural FC Light Heavyweight K-1 Championship

=== Amateur ===
- World Association of Kickboxing Organizations
  - 2021 WAKO Hungarian World Cup K-1 -91 kg (gold)
- World Kickboxing Federation'
  - 2025 WKF Kickboxing World Cup K-1 -91 kg (gold)

== Kickboxing record ==
Professional kickboxing record
16 wins (4 (T)KOs), 8 losses, 0 draws
Date	Result	Opponent	Event	Location	Method	Round	Time
2026-08-01	Loss	(Russia) Ian Petrovich	K-1 World GP 2027 -90kg Preliminary in Yekaterinburg, Semifinals	Yekaterinburg, Russia	Decision (unanimous)	3	3:00
2024-10-16	Loss	(Portugal) Iuri Fernandes	Ural FC 8	Perm, Russia	Decision (unanimous)	3	3:00
2023-10-20	Win	(Morocco) Boubaker El Bakouri	Ural FC 4	Perm, Russia	Decision (unanimous)	3	3:00
Defends the Ural FC Light Heavyweight (-90 kg) K-1 title.
2023-07-28	Loss	(Belarus) Mikita Shostak	RCC 16	Yekaterinburg, Russia	Decision (unanimous)	3	3:00
2023-06-10	Win	(Russia) Ian Petrovich	RCC Fair Fight XXI	Yekaterinburg, Russia	Decision (unanimous)	3	3:00
2023-03-25	Win	(Brazil) Ariel Machado	Ural FC 2	Kazan, Russia	KO (punches)	2	2:25
Wins the inaugural Ural FC Light Heavyweight (-90 kg) K-1 title.
2022-08-26	Win	(Russia) Gadzhi Medzhidov	RCC 12	Yekaterinburg, Russia	Decision (unanimous)	3	3:00
2022-07-01	Win	(Turkey) Enes Ilben	Ural FC 1	Kazan, Russia	KO (right cross)	1	2:13
2021-12-13	Loss	(Brazil) Jhonata Diniz	2021 Tatneft Cup, +80 kg Tournament Finals	Kazan, Russia	KO (left hook)	1	2:44
For the Tatneft Cup Heavyweight (+80 kg) title.
2021-12-13	Win	(Russia) Nadir Ghadjiev	2021 Tatneft Cup, +80 kg Tournament Semifinals	Kazan, Russia	Decision	3	3:00
2021-10-26	Win	(Russia) Nadir Iskhakov	2021 Tatneft Cup, +80 kg Tournament Quarterfinals	Kazan, Russia	TKO (retirement)	2	3:00
2021-03-06	Loss	(Russia) Beybulat Isaev	Fair Fight XIV	Yekaterinburg, Russia	KO (head kick)	1	2:30
2020-11-28	Win	(Russia) Usman Yakhyaev	Fair Fight XIII	Kazan, Russia	TKO (referee stoppage)	2	
2019-12-15	Win	(Morocco) Badr Ferdaous	2019 Tatneft Cup, +80 kg Prestige Fight	Kazan, Russia	Decision	3	3:00
2019-07-19	Loss	(Italy) Claudio Istrate	2019 Tatneft Cup, +80 kg Tournament Quarterfinals	Kazan, Russia	Decision	3	3:00
2019-06-11	Win	(Algeria) Florent Kaouachi	2019 Tatneft Cup, +80 kg Tournament Opening Round	Kazan, Russia	Decision	3	3:00
Legend: Win Loss Draw/no contest Notes

Amateur kickboxing record
Date	Result	Opponent	Event	Location	Method	Round	Time
2025-09-21	Win	(Belarus) Ihar Kavalenka	WKF Kickboxing World Cup 2025, Tournament Final	Minsk, Belarus	KO (left hook to the body)	1	1:45
Wins the 2025 WKF Kickboxing World Cup K-1 -91kg Gold Medal.
2025-09-21	Win	(Moldova) Stanislav Verbin	WKF Kickboxing World Cup 2025, Tournament Semifinal	Minsk, Belarus	Decision	3	2:00
2021-09-19	Win	(Hungary) Dávid Szabó-Tóth	WAKO 26th Hungarian Kickboxing World Cup 2021, Tournament Final	Budapest, Hungary	Decision (3:0)	3	3:00
Wins the 2021 WAKO Hungarian World Cup K-1 -91kg Gold Medal.
2021-09-18	Win	(Croatia) Ivan Bertić	WAKO 26th Hungarian Kickboxing World Cup 2021, Tournament Semifinal	Budapest, Hungary	Decision (3:0)	3	3:00
2021-09-17	Win	(Moldova) Pavel Voronin	WAKO 26th Hungarian Kickboxing World Cup 2021, Tournament Quarterfinal	Budapest, Hungary	Decision (3:0)	3	3:00
Legend: Win Loss Draw/no contest Notes

== Karate combat record ==
Res.	Record	Opponent	Method	Event	Date	Round	Time	Location	Notes
Loss	0–1	Ali Aliev	TKO (punches)	Karate Combat 60	May 27, 2026	2	0:39	Yekaterinburg, Russia	

== See also ==
- List of male kickboxers
