= Mohammad Ghaedi =

Iranian kickboxer

- Born: Mohammad Ghaedibardeh; December 4, 1992 (age 33); Ahvaz, Iran
- Other names: Destroyer; The Persian Destroyer (former)
- Nationality: Iranian
- Height: 1.91 m (6 ft 3 in)
- Weight: 84 kg (185 lb; 13.2 st)
- Style: Kickboxing, Muay Thai
- Fighting out of: Zevenbergen, Netherlands
- Team: Superpro Sportcenter

Kickboxing record
- Total: 68
- Wins: 58
- By knockout: 41
- Losses: 9
- By knockout: 5
- Draws: 0
- No contests: 1

Mohammad Ghaedibardeh (born 4 December 1992), commonly known as Mohammad Ghaedi, is an Iranian professional Muay Thai kickboxer. He is the former Enfusion Middleweight World Champion. Ghaedibardeh formerly fought in K-1. As of May 2022, he was the #5 ranked middleweight kickboxer in the world by Combat Press.

== Championships and awards ==
=== Kickboxing ===
- Enfusion
  - 2021 Enfusion Middleweight (-84 kg) Championship

== Fight record ==
Professional kickboxing record (incomplete)
58 wins (41 (T)KOs), 9 losses, 1 no contest
Date	Result	Opponent	Event	Location	Method	Round	Time
2024-01-20	Loss	(China) Yang Guang	EM Legend 45	Pengzhou, China	TKO (arm injury)	1	3:00
2022-12-16	NC	(United Kingdom) Darren Anstey	Enfusion 117	Dubai, United Arab Emirates	No contest (low blow)	2	1:26
2022-03-26	Loss	(Greece) Nikos Tzotzos Echetlaios	Vendetta 25	Istanbul, Turkey	TKO (retirement)	3	3:00
2021-11-12	Win	(Morocco) Khalid El Bakouri	Enfusion 104	Abu Dhabi, United Arab Emirates	Decision (unanimous)	5	3:00
Won the Enfusion Middleweight World Championship.
2019-12-06	Win	(Brazil) Thiago Machado	Enfusion 93	Abu Dhabi, United Arab Emirates	KO (body knee + punch)	1	2:09
2019-10-05	Win	(Belgium) Jente Nnamadim	Enfusion 88	Dordrecht, Netherlands	KO (knee to head)	1	1:26
2019-06-13	Win	(Romania) Alexandru Irimia	SAS Gym 02	Bucharest, Romania	TKO (referee stoppage)	1	2:36
2019-02-16	Loss	(Turkey) Ibrahim Bagli	Akin Dövüş Arenasi	Istanbul, Turkey	DQ (clinch two knee)	1	1:10
2018-12-07	Win	(France) Johane Beauséjour	Enfusion 76	Abu Dhabi, United Arab Emirates	KO (high kick)	3	0:35
2018-09-15	Win	(Thailand) Sudsakorn Sor Klinmee	Shang Wu Hero	China	Decision (unanimous)	3	3:00
2018-06-09	Win	(Turkey) Yahya Geylani	Fight Arena	Istanbul, Turkey	KO (flying knee)	1	
2018-05-05	Win	(Netherlands) Daryl Sichtman	World Champions Kick Boxing Night	Istanbul, Turkey	Decision (unanimous)	3	3:00
2017-11-18	Loss	(Thailand) Rungrawee KemMuaythaigym	EM Legend 25	Sandu, China	Decision (unanimous)	3	3:00
2017-11-11	Loss	(Suriname) Donovan Wisse		Istanbul, Turkey	TKO	2	
2017-09-05	Win	(Netherlands) Thomas Nelson	Kartal Fight Arena	Istanbul, Turkey	Decision (unanimous)	3	3:00
2017-08-05	Loss	(Thailand) Rungrawee KemMuaythaigym	EM Legend 22	Su-ngai Kolok, Thailand	KO (left body shot)	2	2:10
2017-07-09	Win	(Thailand) Parinya M.U.Den	EM Legend 21	Chongqing, China	KO (left uppercut)	2	2:10
2017-04-28	Win	(Russia) Gadzhimurad Amirzhanov	EM Legend 18	Dujiangyan, China	KO (left cross)	1	1:26
2016-12-23	Win	(Russia) Aleksandr Shuliak	EM Legend 15	China	KO		
2016-09-24	Win	(France) Johane Beauséjour	Faith Fight	Xi'an, China	Decision	3	3:00
2016-08-27	Loss	(Belarus) Dzmitry Baranau	EM Legend 11	Dujiangyan, China	TKO (knee injury)	2	0:50
2016-06-05	Win	(Russia) Ivan Grigoriev	EM Legend 9	Chengdu, China	TKO (punches)	2	2:10
2016-	Win	(Romania) Alexandru Stan	EM Legend	China	KO (right hook)	1	
2016-01-	Win	(China) Wang Huaisheng	EM Legend	China	KO (knee to the body)	1	2:45
2015-	Win	(China) Feng Lei	EM Legend	China	TKO (punches)	2	1:32
2015-	Win	(China) Chan	Shandong Heroes	China	KO (low kick)	3	
2014-10-11	Loss	(England) Paul Daley	K-1 World MAX 2014 World Championship Tournament Final	Pattaya, Thailand	Decision (unanimous)	3	3:00
2014-04-13	Win	(Thailand) Thanilek S.P.L.Chumporn	Bangla Boxing Stadium	Phuket, Thailand	KO (high kick)	1	
2013-08-02	Loss	(Turkey) Atakan Arslan	Bangla Boxing Stadium	Phuket, Thailand	Decision	5	3:00
2013-05-01	Win	(Thailand) Tang	Bangla Boxing Stadium	Phuket, Thailand	KO	1	
2013-03-18	Win	(Thailand) Chai	Bangla Boxing Stadium	Phuket, Thailand	TKO	1	
2013-03-11	Win	(England) Garrsion	Bangla Boxing Stadium	Phuket, Thailand	KO	1	
Legend: Win Loss Draw/no contest Notes

Amateur Muay Thai record
Date	Result	Opponent	Event	Location	Method	Round	Time
2016-11-24	Loss	(Portugal) Diogo Calado	IFMA World Cup 2016 in Kazan, Semi Final	Kazan, Russia	Decision	3	
Won 2016 IFMA World Cup -75kg Bronze Medal.
Legend: Win Loss Draw/no contest Notes

== See also ==
- List of male kickboxers
