= ONE Fight Night 25 =

Combat sport events in 2024

ONE Fight Night 25: Nicolas vs. Eersel 2
- The poster for ONE Fight Night 25: Nicolas vs. Eersel 2
- Promotion: ONE Championship
- Date: October 5, 2024
- Venue: Lumpinee Boxing Stadium
- City: Bangkok, Thailand

Event chronology
ONE Friday Fights 82: Yod-IQ vs. Dayakaev	ONE Fight Night 25: Nicolas vs. Eersel 2	ONE Friday Fights 83: Panrit vs. Superball

ONE Fight Night 25: Nicolas vs. Eersel 2 was a combat sport event produced by ONE Championship that took place on October 5, 2024, at Lumpinee Boxing Stadium in Bangkok, Thailand.

== Background ==
A ONE Lightweight Kickboxing World Championship rematch between current champion Alexis Nicolas and former champion (also current ONE Lightweight Muay Thai World Champion) Regian Eersel headlined the event. They previously met at ONE Fight Night 21 in April 2024, where Nicolas won the title by unanimous decision.

An interim ONE Women's Atomweight World Championship bout between Denice Zamboanga and Alyona Rassohyna was expected to take place at the event. However in August 2024, it was announced that Zamboanga had withdrawn from the bout due to a hamstring injury and the bout was cancelled.

Three fights scheduled for the card: Kongthoranee Sor.Sommai versus Tagir Khalilov, Shir Cohen versus Amy Pirnie, and Jihin Radzuan versus Ayaka Miura - were in jeopardy when Kongthoranee, Khalilov, Cohen and Radzuan all failed to give hydrated samples. Cohen/Pirnie stayed on the card at a catchweight, while the other two bouts were cancelled. Also, Banma Duoji came in at 136.25 lb and was fined a percentage went go to Danial Williams.

== Results ==
Fight card (Amazon Prime Video)
Weight class				Method	Round	Time	Notes
Lightweight Kickboxing	Regian Eersel	def.	Alexis Nicolas (c)	Decision (unanimous)	5	3:00	(Note: For the ONE Lightweight Kickboxing World Championship.)
Lightweight Muay Thai	Youssef Assouik	def.	Sinsamut Klinmee	Decision (unanimous)	3	3:00
Bantamweight Muay Thai	John Lineker	def.	Alexey Balyko	KO (punches)	1	2:14
Strawweight	Mansur Malachiev	def.	Bokang Masunyane	Decision (unanimous)	3	5:00
Flyweight Muay Thai	Johan Estupiñan	def.	Zakaria El Jamari	KO (punches)	2	1:07
Catchweight (119.25 lb) Muay Thai	Shir Cohen	def.	Amy Pirnie	Decision (unanimous)	3	3:00
Strawweight Muay Thai	Rui Botelho	def.	Thongpoon P.K.Saenchai	Decision (unanimous)	3	3:00
Catchweight (136.25 lb)	Danial Williams	def.	Banma Duoji	Decision (unanimous)	3	5:00

== Bonus awards ==
The following fighters received $50,000 bonuses.

- Performance of the Night: John Lineker and Johan Estupiñan

== See also ==
- 2024 in ONE Championship
- List of ONE Championship events
- List of current ONE fighters
- ONE Championship Rankings
