= ONE Fight Night 34 =

Combat sport events in 2025

ONE Fight Night 34: Eersel vs. Jarvis
- The poster for ONE Fight Night 34: Eersel vs. Jarvis
- Promotion: ONE Championship
- Date: August 2, 2025
- Venue: Lumpinee Boxing Stadium
- City: Bangkok, Thailand

Event chronology
ONE Fight Night 33: Rodrigues vs. Persson	ONE Fight Night 34: Eersel vs. Jarvis	ONE Fight Night 35: Buntan vs. Hemetsberger

ONE Fight Night 34: Eersel vs. Jarvis was a combat sports event produced by ONE Championship that took place on August 2, 2025, at Lumpinee Boxing Stadium in Bangkok, Thailand.

== Background ==
A ONE Lightweight Muay Thai World Championship bout between current champion (also former two-time ONE Lightweight Kickboxing World Champion) Regian Eersel and George Jarvis headlined the event.

== Results ==
Fight card (Amazon Prime Video)
Weight class				Method	Round	Time	Notes
Lightweight Muay Thai	Regian Eersel (c)	def.	George Jarvis	KO (punches)	1	1:24	(Note: For the ONE Lightweight Muay Thai World Championship.)
Lightweight Muay Thai	Rungrawee Sitsongpeenong	def.	Youssef Assouik	Decision (unanimous)	3	3:00
Featherweight	Shamil Gasanov	def.	Garry Tonon	Decision (unanimous)	3	5:00
Heavyweight	Kirill Grishenko	def.	Ben Tynan	Decision (unanimous)	3	5:00
Bantamweight	Elbek Alyshov	def.	Jeremy Pacatiw	Submission (arm triangle choke)	2	1:17	(Note: Alyshov missed weight (148.5 lb).)
Heavyweight	Ryugo Takeuchi	def.	Kang Ji-won	KO (punches)	1	1:38
Bantamweight Muay Thai	Suakim Sor.Jor.Tongprajin	def.	Zafer Şayik	Decision (unanimous)	3	3:00
Strawweight Muay Thai	Ellis Badr Barboza	def.	Shamil Adukhov	TKO (elbow)	3	2:08	(Note: Adukhov missed weight (130.25 lb).)

== Bonus awards ==
The following fighters received $50,000 bonuses:

- Performance of the Night: Regian Eersel and Ryugo Takeuchi

== See also ==
- 2025 in ONE Championship
- List of ONE Championship events
- List of current ONE fighters
- ONE Championship Rankings
