= Diaguely Camara =

French kickboxer

- Born: February 18, 1993 (age 33)
- Height: 1.86 m (6 ft 1 in)
- Weight: 77 kg (170 lb; 12.1 st)
- Fighting out of: Clichy-sous-Bois, France
- Team: The Hood Fight Club

Kickboxing record
- Total: 38
- Wins: 29
- By knockout: 15
- Losses: 7
- By knockout: 0
- Draws: 2

Diaguely Camara (born 18 February 1993) is a French professional kickboxer who competes in the Welterweight division of Glory. He previously competed in the Dynamite Fighting Show (DFS).

As of September 2026, Camara is ranked the #10 welterweight in the world by Beyond Kickboxing.

== Professional career ==
Camara made his Glory debut against Eduard Gafencu at Glory: Collision 5 on June 17, 2023. He won the fight by a second-round knockout.

Camara faced Ilyass Chakir at Glory 88 on September 9, 2023. He won the fight by unanimous decision.

Camara faced the second-ranked Glory welterweight contender Hamicha at Glory: Collision 6 on November 4, 2023. He lost the fight by split decision.

Camara faced Robin Ciric at Glory 91, on April 27, 2024. He lost the bout via unanimous decision.

Following a five fight stint outside of the organization, which saw him go on a five fight winning and knockout streak, during which he captured the Superfight K-1 -77 kg title, Camara returned to Glory at Glory 109,on September 5, 2026. He faced off against Dmitry Menshikov, losing via unanimous decision after being dropped twice in the opening round.

== Championships and accomplishments ==
- IKKC
  - IKKC World Middleweight Muay Thai Championship

== Kickboxing record ==
Kickboxing record
29 wins (15 KOs), 7 losses, 2 draws
Date	Result	Opponent	Event	Location	Method	Round	Time	Record
2026-09-05	Loss	(Russia) Dmitry Menshikov	Glory 109	Rotterdam, Netherlands	Decision (Unanimous)	3	3:00	29-7-2
2025-11-22	Win	(Turkey) Kubilay Tarhan	Loca Fight Club	Istanbul, Turkey	KO (low kick)	2	1:41	29-6-2
2025-08-09	Win	(Spain) Umar Abubakar	Gladiator's Boxing Series 3	La Londe-les-Maures, France	TKO (knee + left cross)	2		28-6-2
2025-07-19	Win	(Spain) Adrian Martinez Villar	Le Choc des Gladiateurs 23	Le Lavandou, France	TKO (low kicks)	3		27-6-2
2025-06-14	Win	(France) Fabrice Touré	SPF Superfight 7	Clichy, France	TKO	1		26-6-2
Wins the vacant Superfight K-1 -77kg title.
2025-05-24	Win	(France) Majid Amarouche	TKR	Beauvais, France	TKO (body punches)	3		25–6–2
2024-04-27	Loss	(Netherlands) Robin Ciric	Glory 91	Paris, France	Decision (unanimous)	3	3:00	24–6–2
2023-11-04	Loss	(Morocco) Hamicha	Glory: Collision 6	Arnhem, Netherlands	Decision (split)	3	3:00	24–5–2
2023-09-09	Win	(Morocco) Ilyass Chakir	Glory 88	Paris, France	Decision (unanimous)	3	3:00	24–4–2
2023-07-22	Draw	(France) Cédric Do	Le Choc des Gladiateurs	Le Lavandou, France	Decision	3	3:00	23–4–2
2023-06-17	Win	(Romania) Eduard Gafencu	Glory: Collision 5	Rotterdam, Netherlands	TKO (knee)	2	2:24	23–4–1
2022-12-03	Win	(France) Geisym Derouiche	TKR	Bezons, France	Decision	3	3:00	22–4–1
2022-10-19	Win	(Romania) Florin Lambagiu	Dynamite Fighting Show 16	Iași, Romania	Decision (unanimous)	3	3:00	21–4–1
2022-06-25	Win	(Switzerland) Manuel Rifa	Ultimate Thai 7	Massy, France	TKO	5	2:15	20–4–1
2022-06-11	Win	(Spain) Maximo Suárez	La Nuit De L'Impact 6	Saintes, France	KO (jump kick)	1	2:47	19–4–1
2022-03-20	Loss	(Morocco) Ilyass Chakir	Fight For Honor 8	Grimbergen, Belgium	Decision	3	3:00	18–4–1
2021-12-15	Win	(Romania) Bogdan Năstase	Dynamite Fighting Show 13	Bucharest, Romania	Decision (split)	3	3:00	18–3–1
2021-12-04	Win	(France) Corentin Jallon	K1 Event 14	Troyes, France	Decision	3	3:00	17–3–1
2021-10-02	Win	(France) Tarik Benhamed	Louna Boxing 14	Sisteron, France	KO (left hooK)	2		16–3–1
2020-02-29	Loss	(Turkey) Atakan Arslan	Akin Dovus Arenasi	Istanbul, Turkey	Decision	3	3:00	15–3–1
2020-02-08	Loss	(Spain) Mohammed Hamdi	Box'in Night	Nimes, France	Decision	3	3:00	15–2–1
2019-11-30	Win	(France) Benoit Pilgrim	Fight Of Honor	Woippy, France	TKO	3		15–1–1
2019-11-09	Win	(France) Mourad Keffif	La Nuit des Titans	Tournai, Belgium	KO	2		14–1–1
2019-07-11	Win	(Italy) Luca Andreani	B-Fight	Noceto, Italy	Decision	3	3:00	13–1–1
2019-04-27	Win	(France) Assane Bafeta	Hannibal Fight	Laxou, France	Decision	3	3:00	12–1–1
2019-04-13	Win	(Australia) James Honey	Fighters Level Up	Clichy-sous-Bois, France	KO	3		11–1–1
2019-03-09	Win	(United States) Charles Bisset	Cali 33: The Next Level	Burbank, United States	KO	3		10–1–1
Wins the IKKC Middleweight (-86.2 kg) Championship.
2018-10-27	Win	(France) Zakaria Messaoudi	Fighters Level Up	Clichy-sous-Bois, France	Decision	3	3:00	9–1–1
2018-07-21	Win	(France) Rami Taghouti	Arena Fight	Fréjus, France	KO	2		8–1–1
2018-04-07	Draw	(Germany) Badri Traore	One Team Fight Night	Reutlingen, Germany	Decision	3	3:00	7–1–1
2018-01-27	Win	(Belgium) Damien Slavko	Fighters Level Up	Clichy-sous-Bois, France	Decision	3	3:00	7–1
2017-07-06	Win	(Italy) Lorenzo Domenichini	BF 6	Noceto, Italy	TKO	3		6–1
2017-05-27	Loss	(Switzerland) Ueli Birchler	The Story	Olten, Switzerland	Decision	3	3:00	5–1
Legend: Win Loss Draw/no contest Notes

== See also ==
- List of male kickboxers
