= Alexis Nicolas (kickboxer) =

French kickboxer and mixed martial artist (born 1998)

- Born: 14 July 1998 (age 28); Paris, France
- Nickname: Barboza
- Height: 1.83 m (6 ft 0 in)
- Weight: 76.6 kg (169 lb; 12 st 1 lb)
- Division: Lightweight (ONE); Super middleweight
- Style: Kickboxing; Savate
- Fighting out of: Paris, France
- Team: Mahmoudi Gym (Kickboxing); ATCH Academy (MMA)
- Years active: 2021–present

Kickboxing record
- Total: 18
- Wins: 16
- By knockout: 5
- Losses: 2

Mixed martial arts record
- Total: 2
- Wins: 2
- By knockout: 2
- Losses: 0

Alexis Nicolas (born 14 July 1998) is a French mixed martial athlete He is a former ISKA World Super Middleweight K-1 champion and the former ONE Lightweight Kickboxing World Champion.

In May 2024, Nicolas was ranked as the third best men's welterweight kickboxer in the world by Beyond Kickboxing, and No. 1 ranked welterweight in the world by Combat Press

== Biography and career ==
=== Early life ===
Nicolas was born to a Haitian father and an Algerian mother. Nicolas' early life had been full of abuse, poverty and violence. To atone for the rage he became prone to, he took up savate at the age of 14. He became multiple times French champion in different age categories. On 19 December 2021, He won the FISav Savate world title against Anton Chernikov by unanimous decision. Following that victory Nicolas took the decision to transition to kickboxing rules, training out of Mahmoudi Gym.

=== Kickboxing transition ===
On 22 June 2022, Nicolas faced Mohammad Amir from Iran at Kunlun Fight and Cicada FC 1 in Dubai. He won the fight by second round technical knockout due to low kicks.

On 26 November 2022, Nicolas faced Ismael Ayaadi at Tour Event Fight 10. He won the fight by unanimous decision.

Nicolas faced Abdellah Oussaid for the vacant MTGP K-1 World 77 kg title at Muay Thai Grand Prix on 23 March 2023. He won the fight by unanimous decision.

Nicolas faced Ioannis Bitsios for the vacant ISKA World Super Middleweight K-1 Championship on 25 November 2023, at Tour Event Fight 11. He won the bout by knockout in the second round to win the vacant title.

=== ONE Championship ===
Nicolas faced Magomed Magomedov at ONE Friday Fights 47 on 12 January 2024. He won the bout by unanimous decision.

==== ONE Lightweight Kickboxing World Champion ====
Nicolas faced defending ONE Lightweight Kickboxing World Champion Regian Eersel on 6 April 2024, at the main event of ONE Fight Night 21. He won the bout by unanimous decision to win the title.

The rematch between Nicolas and Eersel for the ONE Lightweight Kickboxing World Championship took place on 5 October 2024, at ONE Fight Night 25. He lost the title via unanimous decision. At the end of 2024, Nicolas was ranked among the five "Breakout Star of the Year" for ONE Championship.

The trilogy bout between Nicolas and Eersel took place on 5 April 2025, at ONE Fight Night 30. At the weigh-ins, Eersel failed the hydration test and came in at 170.5 pounds, 0.5 pounds over the lightweight limit. As a results, Eersel was stripped of the title and Nicolas was eligible to win it. He lost the fight via unanimous decision.

On September 9, 2025, it was announced that Nicolas was released from ONE Championship.

== Mixed martial art career ==
Nicolas made his professional mixed martial arts debut on April 10, 2026, against Jack Woodard at Ares FC 40. He won the fight by second round technical knockout.

== Titles and accomplishments ==
=== Kickboxing ===
- ONE Championship
  - ONE Lightweight Kickboxing World Championship (One time)
  - First French champion in ONE Championship
- International Sport Kickboxing Association
  - 2023 ISKA K-1 World Super-middleweight (−78 kg) Champion
- Muay Thai Grand Prix
  - 2023 KGP K-1 World −77 kg Champion (one defense)

=== Savate ===
- Federation Internationale de Savate
  - 2021 FISav World −80 kg Champion
  - 2019 FISav Junior World Championship Winner
  - 2018 FISav Junior European Championship Winner (−75 kg)
  - 2017 FISav World Championship Runner-up (−75 kg)
- Fédération Française Savate boxe française et discipline associé
  - 2019 FF SAVATE boxe française Elite A −75 kg Champion
  - 2018 FF SAVATE boxe française Junior −75 kg Champion
  - 2017 FF SAVATE boxe française Junior −75 kg Champion

== Mixed martial arts record ==
Professional record breakdown
2 matches	2 wins	0 losses
By knockout	2	0
By submission	0	0
By decision	0	0

Res.	Record	Opponent	Method	Event	Date	Round	Time	Location	Notes
		Bilal Bakhouche-Chareuf		Ares FC 46	12 December 2026			Paris, France	
Win	2–0	Ilyasse Drabo	TKO (punches)	Ares FC 43	25 September 2026	1	2:52	Paris, France	Catchweight (173 lb) bout; Drabo missed weight.
Win	1–0	Jack Woodard	TKO (punches)	Ares FC 40	10 April 2026	3	3:51	Paris, France	Welterweight debut.

== Kickboxing record ==
Professional Kickboxing record
16 Wins (5 (T)KOs), 2 Losses
Date	Result	Opponent	Event	Location	Method	Round	Time
2025-04-05	Loss	(Suriname) Regian Eersel	ONE Fight Night 30	Bangkok, Thailand	Decision (Majority)	5	3:00
For the ONE Lightweight Kickboxing World Championship.
2024-10-05	Loss	(Suriname) Regian Eersel	ONE Fight Night 25	Bangkok, Thailand	Decision (Unanimous)	5	3:00
Loses the ONE Lightweight Kickboxing World Championship.
2024-04-06	Win	(Suriname) Regian Eersel	ONE Fight Night 21	Bangkok, Thailand	Decision (Unanimous)	5	3:00
Wins the ONE Lightweight Kickboxing World Championship.
2024-01-12	Win	(Russia) Magomed Magomedov	ONE Friday Fights 47	Bangkok, Thailand	Decision (Unanimous)	3	3:00
2023-11-25	Win	(Greece) Ioannis Bitsios	Tour Event Fight 11	Tours, France	KO (High kick)	2	
Wins the vacant ISKA K-1 World Super-middleweight (78kg) title.
2023-06-24	Win	(United Kingdom) Charlie O'Neill	MTGP Impact in Paris	Paris, France	Decision (Unanimous)	5	3:00
Defends the KGP K-1 World −77kg title.
2023-04-22	Win	(Mali) Mohamed Diaby	S1 Apollo Savate Pro 3, Tournament Final	Arpajon, France	KO (Left hook)	4	1:12
2023-04-22	Win	(France) Stéphane Fofou	S1 Apollo Savate Pro 3, Tournament semi-final	Arpajon, France	Decision (Unanimous)	3	2:00
2023-03-17	Win	(Morocco) Abdellah Oussaid	Muay Thai Grand Prix	Paris, France	Decision (Unanimous)	5	3:00
Wins the vacant KGP K-1 World −77kg title.
2023-01-20	Win	(Italy) Alessio Zeloni	Boxing Fighters System Event 3	Nimes, France	Decision (Unanimous)	3	3:00
2022-11-26	Win	(Belgium) Ismael Ayaadi	Tour Event Fight 10	Tours, France	Decision (Unanimous)	3	3:00
2022-07-10	Win	(France) Steven Mendes	Muay Thai Grand Prix	Paris, France	TKO (Shoulder injury)	2	
2022-06-25	Win	(Iran) Mohammad Amir	Kunlun Fight and Cicada FC 1	Dubai, UAE	TKO (Low kicks)	2	1:08
2022-06-11	Win	(France) Madické Kamara	Corbeil Fight Event 3	Corbeil-Essonnes, France	Decision (Unanimous)	3	3:00
2022-04-03	Win	(United Kingdom) Aaron Slimane	Muay Thai Grand Prix London	London, England	TKO (Punches)	1	2:25
2022-01-29	Win	(France) Stéphane Fofou	S1 Apollo Savate Pro 2	Paris, France	Decision (Unanimous)	5	2:00
2021-12-19	Win	(Ukraine) Anton Chernikov	ALES FIGHT NIGHT	Alès, France	Decision (Unanimous)	5	2:00
Wins FISav World −80kg title.
2021-04-03	Win	(France) Kévin Albertus	S1 Apollo Savate Pro 1	Paris, France	Decision	5	2:00
Legend: Win Loss Draw/No contest Notes
