= Regian Eersel =

Surinamese-Dutch kickboxer (born 1992)

- Born: Regian Braudilio Gudo Eersel; December 16, 1992 (age 33); Paramaribo, Suriname
- Other names: The Immortal
- Height: 1.89 m (6 ft 2 1/2 in)
- Weight: 77.1 kg (170 lb; 12.14 st)
- Division: Lightweight (ONE); Welterweight; Middleweight
- Reach: 77.0 in (196 cm)
- Style: Muay Thai, kickboxing
- Fighting out of: Amsterdam, Netherlands
- Team: Sityodtong Amsterdam (2008–present)
- Trainer: Paul Pengel; Vincent Pengel
- Years active: 2013–present

Kickboxing record
- Total: 71
- Wins: 66
- By knockout: 29
- Losses: 5

Other information
- Boxing record from BoxRec

Regian Eersel (born 16 December 1992) is a Surinamese-Dutch kickboxer currently signed to ONE Championship. He is the current ONE Lightweight Muay Thai World Champion and current ONE Lightweight Kickboxing World Champion.

Regian Eersel is one of the most accomplished champions in ONE Championship, holding multiple records including being the first person to defend belts in two sports (Kickboxing and Muay thai), the only person to defend them multiple times, most title defenses in kickboxing, and tied for most title wins in ONE Championship with 11.

He is ranked as the best welterweight in the world by Combat Press as of September 2022, and the second best by Beyond Kickboxing as of October 2022. He has been continually ranked in Combat Press the top 10 since March 2019. As of March 2023, Eersel is ranked the No. 1 light heavyweight by WBC Muaythai. Eersel holds notable victories over Nieky Holzken (2×), Dmitry Menshikov, Sinsamut Klinmee (2×), Arian Sadiković, Mustapha Haida, Jamal Yusupov, George Jarvis, Sergej Braun, Brad Riddell, Rungrawee Sitsongpeenong, Alexis Nicolas (2×) and Jo Nattawut

== Background ==
Eersel was born in Paramaribo, Suriname and moved to the Netherlands with his family when he was four years old. He started taekwondo at the age of eight, and transitioned to rugby afterwards. At the age of 15, he started training at Sityodtong Gym in Amsterdam. His nickname, The Immortal, was given to Eersel in this early amateur era. His teammates gave it to him, as he never used the break time between the rounds to sit and regain breath.

As it was not easy to find competitors in the Netherlands after becoming a professional athlete in his weight class, he tried his luck abroad. In Baku, Azerbaijan, Eersel took part in a K1-tournament, where he qualified for the finals. He did not win the finals, but the hunger for more had started.

After this Eersel was invited for competitions in his country of birth Surinam, Russia (W5), Greece, Germany, Turkey (Mix Fight Gala), the US (Legacy and Lion Fight) and China (Wu Lin Feng, Glory of Heroes).

== Career ==
=== Early career ===
Eersel made his Lion Fight debut against Jo Nattawut at Lion Fight 29 on May 27, 2016. He won the fight in the fifth round, with a head kick knockout.

After defeating the two-weight Lion Fight champion, Eersel was given a chance to fight for the Super Middleweight title, with his opponent being Jake Purdy. The title bout took place at Lion Fight 33 on November 18, 2016. Eersel won the fight by a second-round technical knockout. He then fought Chen Yawei during Mix Fight Gala 20, on December 3, 2016, winning the fight by a first round-knockout. Eersel made his first Lion Fight title defense against Dewitt Pratt at Lion Fight 34 on February 3, 2017. He won the fight by a knockout in the first round.

Eersel took part in the Mix Fight Gala 78.5 kg tournament, which took place at Mix Fight Gala 21 on May 6, 2017. He beat Marco Pleschberger in the semi-finals by a second-round technical knockout, and Sergej Braun in the finals by a first-round knockout to capture the tournament title.

Regian made his second Lion Fight title defense against Matous Kohout at Lion Fight 38 on September 29, 2017. He won the fight by a fifth-round KO. His third title defense came during Lion Fight 50, when he defeated Joakim Hagg by a fifth-round TKO.

=== ONE Championship ===
Eersel made his ONE Championship debut against Brad Riddell at ONE Championship: Heroes of Honor in April 2018. Eersel won the fight by a unanimous decision. Despite being contracted with ONE Championship, Eersel made his third Lion Fight title defense against Joakim Hagg at Lion Fight 50 on November 3, 2018. He won the fight by a fifth-round technical knockout.

Eersel faced Anthony Njokuani at ONE Championship: Call to Greatness on February 22, 2019. He won the fight by second-round knockout. The fight ended in some controversy, as Njokuani claimed an illegal elbow led to his stoppage loss. Njokuani later appealed the decision.

==== Lightweight kickboxing champion ====
On May 17, 2019, he challenged Nieky Holzken for the ONE Lightweight Kickboxing World Championship at ONE Championship 96: Enter the Dragon on May 17, 2019. He won the fight by unanimous decision. Eersel made his first title defense in an immediate rematch with Holzken at ONE Championship: Dawn Of Valor on October 26, 2019. He once again won the fight by unanimous decision.

Eersel was booked to make his second title defense against Mustapha Haida at ONE Championship: Unbreakable. However, Haida was forced to withdraw after sustaining an injury, leading to the cancellation of their bout. Regian Eersel was later scheduled to defend the ONE Lightweight Kickboxing World Championship against Islam Murtazaev at ONE Championship: Fists Of Fury 3 on March 19, 2021. Murtazaev himself would later withdraw, for undisclosed reasons, and was replaced by Mustapha Haida. Eersel successfully defended the title by unanimous decision.

Eersel defended his title against Islam Murtazaev at ONE: Winter Warriors on December 3, 2021. He won the bout via split decision.

Eersel was scheduled to make his fourth ONE lightweight title defense against Arian Sadiković at ONE 156 on April 8, 2022. Despite suffering an early knockdown, Eersel rallied back to win the following rounds and retain his title by unanimous decision. He was awarded a $50,000 bonus for winning the fight.

==== Two sport lightweight champion ====
Eersel faced Sinsamut Klinmee for the inaugural ONE Muay Thai Lightweight World Championship at ONE on Prime Video 3 on October 21, 2022. He captured the championship by split decision.

Eersel made his first lightweight Muay Thai title defense in an immediate rematch with Sinsamut Klinmee at ONE Friday Fights 9 on March 17, 2023. He won the fight by a fourth-round knockout. Eersel was awarded a $50,000 bonus following this victory.

Eersel defended his Muay Thai title against Dmitry Menshikov at ONE Fight Night 11 on June 9, 2023. He won the fight by a first-round knockout.

Eersel faced Alexis Nicolas at ONE Fight Night 21 on April 6, 2024, he lost his Kickboxing title via unanimous decision.

The rematch between Eersel and Nicolas for the ONE Lightweight Kickboxing World Championship took place on October 5, 2024, at ONE Fight Night 25. He won the title via unanimous decision.

The trilogy bout between Eersel and Nicolas took place on April 5, 2025, at ONE Fight Night 30. At the weigh-ins, Eersel failed the hydration test and came in at 170.5 pounds, 0.5 pounds over the lightweight limit. As a results, Eersel was stripped of the title and Nicolas was eligible to win it. He won the fight via unanimous decision.

Eersel defended his Muay Thai title against George Jarvis at ONE Fight Night 34 on August 2, 2025. He won the fight via TKO in the first round, scoring two knockdowns in just under 90 seconds.

== Personal life ==
Eersel and his girlfriend have two daughters.

== Championships and accomplishments ==
- ONE Championship
  - ONE Lightweight Muay Thai World Championship (one time; current)
    - Four successful title defenses
  - ONE Lightweight Kickboxing World Championship (three times; current)
    - Four successful title defenses
    - First Superseries champion to reclaim their belt
  - Performance of the Night (four times) (vs. Arian Sadiković, Sinsamut Klinmee, Dmitry Menshikov, George Jarvis)
  - Third athlete to hold belts in two sports in ONE Championship (Muay Thai, Kickboxing)
  - Only athlete in ONE Championship to defend the belts in both sports
  - most title defenses for kickboxing in ONE Championship (4)
  - most consecutive title defenses for kickboxing in ONE Championship (4)
  - Most wins in the ONE Super Series Lightweight Division (13)
  - Most title wins in ONE Championship (12)
  - Longest Kickboxing win streak in ONE Championship (7)
  - Most cumulative Significant strikes landed in One Super Series Lightweight
- Mix Fighting Championship
  - 2017 Mix Fight -78.5 kg Tournament winner
- Lion Fight
  - Lion Fight Super Middleweight World Champion (168 lb) 2016
    - Three successful title defenses

== Fight record ==
Professional Muay Thai and kickboxing record
66 wins (29 (T)KOs), 5 losses, 0 draws, 0 no contests
Date	Result	Opponent	Event	Location	Method	Round	Time
2026-10-02	Win	(United Kingdom) George Jarvis	ONE The Inner Circle 33	Bangkok, Thailand	KO (left hook)	4	1:39
Defends the ONE Muay Thai World Lightweight title.
2026-04-10	Win	(Thailand) Rungrawee Sitsongpeenong	ONE Friday Fights 150	Bangkok, Thailand	Decision (unanimous)	5	3:00
Wins the vacant ONE Lightweight Kickboxing World Championship.
2025-08-02	Win	(United Kingdom) George Jarvis	ONE Fight Night 34	Bangkok, Thailand	TKO (right cross)	1	1:24
Defends the ONE Muay Thai World Lightweight title.
2025-04-05	Win	(France) Alexis Nicolas	ONE Fight Night 30	Bangkok, Thailand	Decision (majority)	5	3:00
Eersel was stripped of the ONE Lightweight Kickboxing World Championship after missing weight. Only Nicolas could win the title.
2024-10-05	Win	(France) Alexis Nicolas	ONE Fight Night 25	Bangkok, Thailand	Decision (unanimous)	5	3:00
Wins the ONE Lightweight Kickboxing World Championship.
2024-04-06	Loss	(France) Alexis Nicolas	ONE Fight Night 21	Bangkok, Thailand	Decisions (unanimous)	5	3:00
Lost the ONE Lightweight Kickboxing World Championship.
2023-06-10	Win	(Russia) Dmitry Menshikov	ONE Fight Night 11	Bangkok, Thailand	KO (left hook)	1	0:46
Defends the ONE Muay Thai World Lightweight title.
2023-03-17	Win	(Thailand) Sinsamut Klinmee	ONE Friday Fights 9	Bangkok, Thailand	KO (left hook to the body)	4	1:17
Defends the ONE Muay Thai World Lightweight title.
2022-10-21	Win	(Thailand) Sinsamut Klinmee	ONE on Prime Video 3	Kuala Lumpur, Malaysia	Decision (split)	5	3:00
Wins the inaugural ONE Muay Thai World Lightweight title.
2022-04-22	Win	(Bosnia and Herzegovina) Arian Sadiković	ONE 156	Kallang, Singapore	Decision (unanimous)	5	3:00
Defends the ONE Lightweight Kickboxing World Championship.
2021-12-03	Win	(Russia) Islam Murtazaev	ONE: Winter Warriors	Kallang, Singapore	Decision (split)	5	3:00
Defends the ONE Lightweight Kickboxing World Championship.
2021-02-26	Win	(Italy) Mustapha Haida	ONE Championship: Fists Of Fury 3	Kallang, Singapore	Decision (unanimous)	5	3:00
Defends the ONE Lightweight Kickboxing World Championship.
2019-10-26	Win	(Netherlands) Nieky Holzken	ONE Championship: Dawn Of Valor	Jakarta, Indonesia	Decision (unanimous)	5	3:00
Defends the ONE Lightweight Kickboxing World Championship.
2019-05-17	Win	(Netherlands) Nieky Holzken	ONE Championship 96: Enter the Dragon	Kallang, Singapore	Decision (unanimous)	5	3:00
Wins the inaugural ONE Lightweight Kickboxing World Championship.
2019-02-22	Win	(Nigeria) Anthony Njokuani	ONE Championship: Call to Greatness	Singapore	KO (right hook)	2	1:03
2018-11-03	Win	(Sweden) Joakim Hagg	Lion Fight 50	Los Angeles, United States	TKO	5	3:00
Defends the Lion Fight Super Middleweight title.
2018-04-20	Win	(New Zealand) Brad Riddell	ONE Championship: Heroes of Honor	Manila, Philippines	Decision (unanimous)	3	3:00
2018-03-03	Win	(Russia) Jamal Yusupov	Wu Lin Feng 2018: World Championship Tianjin	Tianjin, China	Decision	3	3:00
2017-12-02	Win	(Netherlands) Darryl Sichtman	Mix Fight Gala 23	Frankfurt, Germany	Decision	3	3:00
2017-09-29	Win	(Czech Republic) Matous Kohout	Lion Fight 38	United States	KO (knee to the body)	5	1:00
Defends the Lion Fight Super Middleweight title.
2017-07-01	Win	(France) Djibril Ehouo	Wu Lin Feng	China	KO		
2017-05-06	Win	(Germany) Sergej Braun	Mix Fight Gala 21, Final	Heilbronn, Germany	KO (left hook to the body)	1	
Won the Mix Fight -78.5 kg Tournament title.
2017-05-06	Win	(Germany) Marco Pleschberger	Mix Fight Gala 21, Semi-final	Heilbronn, Germany	TKO	2	
2017-04-01	Win	(China) Ma Yueheng	Wu Lin Feng 2017: China VS Europe	China	KO (knee to the body)	1	1:24
2017-02-03	Win	(United States) Dewitt Pratt	Lion Fight 34	Las Vegas, United States	KO (flying knee + right cross)	1	
Defends the Lion Fight Super Middleweight title.
2016-12-03	Win	(China) Chen Yawei	Mix Fight Gala 20	Frankfurt, Germany	KO (knee to the body)	1	
2016-11-18	Win	(United States) Jake Purdy	Lion Fight 33	United States	KO (flying knee)	2	
Wins the Lion Fight Super Middleweight title.
2016-05-27	Win	(Thailand) Jo Nattawut	Lion Fight 29	United States	KO (right high kick)	5	
2016-03-18	Loss	(Czech Republic) Matous Kohout	Heroes Gate 16	Czech Republic	Decision	3	3:00
2015-12-05	Win	(China) Wang Anying	Wu Lin Feng	China	KO		
2015-04-19	Win	(Morocco) Khalid Bourdif	The Best of all Elements	Almere, Netherlands	TKO (doctor stoppage)	2	
2015-04-04	Win	(China) Nu Erla	Wu Lin Feng	China	KO (high kick)	2	
2015-01-16	Loss	(Brazil) Cosmo Alexandre	Legacy Kickboxing 1	Houston, United States	Decision	3	3:00
2014-12-23	Win	(Germany) Lorand Sachs	Fighting With The Stars	Paramaribo, Suriname	Decision	3	3:00
2014-10-11	Loss	(Russia) Alexander Surzhko	W5 "GRAND PRIX REMATCH	Moscow, Russia	Decision	3	3:00
2013-12-22	Win	(Russia) Alexey Alexeev	W5 "GRAND PRIX MOSCOW	Moscow, Russia	KO	3	
2013-11-16	Win	(Russia) Ivan Babachenko	W5 "GRAND PRIX OREL	Moscow, Russia	Decision	3	3:00
2013-11-03	Win	(Spain) Juan Bol	Enfusion 9	The Hague, Netherlands	Decision	3	3:00
Legend: Win Loss Draw/no contest Notes

== See also ==
- List of male kickboxers
- List of multi-sport athletes
- List of multi-sport champions
