= Dmitry Menshikov =

Russian kickboxer (born 1997)

Dmitriy Menshikov
- Born: 1 December 1997 (age 28); Prokopyevsk, Russia
- Native name: Дмитрий Меньшиков
- Height: 1.80 m (5 ft 11 in)
- Weight: 77 kg (170 lb; 12 st 2 lb)
- Division: Welterweight
- Style: Kickboxing
- Stance: Orthodox
- Fighting out of: Kemerovo, Russia
- Team: Kuzbass Muay Thai; Empire club
- Trainer: Vitaliy Viktorovich, Valery Yuryevich
- Years active: 2015–present

Kickboxing record
- Total: 38
- Wins: 34
- By knockout: 24
- Losses: 3
- By knockout: 1
- No contests: 1

Other information
- Boxing record from BoxRec

Dmitriy Menshikov (Russian: Дмитрий Меньшиков; born December 1, 1997) is a Russian Kickboxer and Muay Thai fighter who has competed in ONE Championship and in the Glory Welterweight division.

== Career ==
=== Early years ===
Menshikov participated in the 2017 Tatneft Cup 80 kg tournament. In the first, quarterfinal, bout of the tournament, Menshikov was scheduled to fight Constantin Rusu. Dmitry won the fight by a second-round TKO. In the semifinals he fought Surik Magakyan, and won by a first-round TKO. In the tournament final, Menshikov fought Sher Mamazulunov. The fight went into an extra fourth round, after which Mamazulunov won a decision.

In his next fight, Menshikov won an extra round decision against Ljubo Jalovi. He won his next two fights against Vasiliy Semenov and Аli Al Ameri by KO.

=== Glory ===
He made his Glory debut at Glory 60: Lyon on October 20, 2018, when he was scheduled to fight Samuel Dbili. Menshikov won the fight by a first-round technical knockout. He next appeared during Glory 62, on December 8, 2018, to fight Robbie Hageman. Menshikov once again won by a first-round technical knockout.

Menshikov's next fight was outside of Glory, as he was booked to face Carlos Prates. He won the fight by decision.

Menshikov's next fight came ten months after his win over Prates. He was scheduled to fight Yoann Kongolo during Glory 69. Dmitry won the fight by TKO, after the ringside doctor stopped the fight, due to a cut Kongolo suffered during the second round.

Menshikov was scheduled to fight Mohamed Mezouari at Glory 78: Arnhem. Menshikov later withdrew from the bout and was replaced by Vedat Hoduk.

Glory released Menshikov from their roster on June 17, 2022, in protest of the 2022 Russian invasion of Ukraine.

=== Russia ===
Menskikov faced Maxim Sulgin at RCC 8 on December 19, 2020. He won the fight by unanimous decision. Menshikov next faced Ismail Uzuner at the February 5, 2022 event, following a fourteen-month absence from the sport. He won the fight by unanimous decision.

Menshikov faced Maxim Sulgin in the main event of RCC Fair Fight 18 on July 15, 2022. The bout was fought in MMA gloves. He won the fight by unanimous decision. Three judges scored the fight 29–28 for Menshikov, while the remaining two judges scored the fight 30–27 and 30–29 in his favor.

Menshikov faced Mehran Mohammadnia at Muaythai Factory on February 2, 2023. He won the fight by a second-round technical knockout.

=== ONE Championship ===
Menshikov has been booked to challenge Regian Eersel for the ONE Lightweight Muay Thai World Championship at ONE Fight Night 11 on June 9, 2023. He lost the fight by a first-round knockout.

Menshikov was scheduled to face Sinsamut Klinmee on September 30, 2023, at ONE Fight Night 14. However, Sinsamut pulled out for injury and was replaced by Rungrawee Sitsongpeenong. He won the fight via three knockdowns technical knockout in the first round.

Menshikov faced Mouhcine Chafi on December 9, 2023, at ONE Fight Night 17. He won the fight via knockout in the first round.

Menshikov faced Sinsamut Klinmee on May 4, 2024, at ONE Fight Night 22. He won the fight by a third-round knockout.

On February 5, 2025, Menshikov served a legal notice to ONE Championship, sighting his intention to leave the promotion after his scheduled February 14 fight with newcomer Tengnueng Sitjaesairoong. Menshikov cited inactivity as a contributing factor to his departure while his legal team determined that ONE's failure to deliver on its obligations, such as offering him only one fight in 2024, constituted a breach of contract.

Menshikov originally won the bout with Tengnueng via KO in the first round. This win was later overturned to a No Contest after Menshikov tested positive for banned substances. Menshikov left ONE Championship following this bout.

=== Rajadamnern World Series ===
Following his departure from ONE Championship, Menshikov made his Rajadamnern World Series (RWS) debut, under Muay Thai rules. He faced Josh Hill on March 14, 2026, winning via KO in round two, knocking Hill down and out with a right cross.

Menshikov returned to RWS at RWS 200, facing off with Emerson Bento on June 27, 2026. He won the bout via KO in the first round, wobbling and dropping Bento with a flurry of punches, before finishing him with a final series of right hands.

=== Wu Lin Feng ===
Menshikov returned to Kickboxing rules at Wu Lin Feng 556, facing off against Xu Yuanqing for the Wu Lin Feng World -77 kg title, on May 16, 2026. He won the bout via unanimous decision.

=== Return to Glory ===
In February 2025, Glory officially rescinded it's ban on Russian fighters, starting with the signing of Russian Heavyweight Asadulla Nasipov. Following this, Menshikov was re-signed to Glory, being booked for Glory 109, on September 5, 2026. He faced Diaguely Camara, winning the bout via unanimous decision after knocking Camara down twice in the opening round.

== Titles and accomplishments ==
- Tafnet Cup
  - 2017 Tatneft Arena Cup -80 kg Runner-up
- Wu Lin Feng
  - 2026 Wu Lin Feng World −77 kg Champion

== Fight record ==
Professional Muay Thai and Kickboxing Record
34 Wins (24 (T)KO's), 3 Losses, 0 Draw, 1 No Contest
Date	Result	Opponent	Event	Location	Method	Round	Time
2026-12-12		(Morocco) Fikri Sabri	Glory Collision 10 - Welterweight Grand Prix, Quarterfinals	Arnhem, Netherlands			
2026-09-05	Win	(France) Diaguely Camara	Glory 109	Rotterdam, Netherlands	Decision (Unanimous)	3	3:00
2026-06-27	Win	(Brazil) Emerson Bento	Rajadamnern World Series 200, Rajadamnern Stadium	Bangkok, Thailand	KO (punches)	1	0:25
2026-05-16	Win	(China) Xu Yuanqing	Wu Lin Feng 556	Pingdingshan, China	Decision (Unanimous)	5	3:00
Wins the Wu Lin Feng World -77kg title.
2026-03-14	Win	(England) Josh Hill	Rajadamnern World Series, Rajadamnern Stadium	Bangkok, Thailand	KO (Right cross)	2	2:27
2025-02-14	NC	(Thailand) Tengnueng Fairtex	ONE Friday Fights 97, Lumpinee Stadium	Bangkok, Thailand	KO	1	2:59
Originally a KO (punches) win for Menshikov; overturned after he tested positive for banned substances.
2024-05-04	Win	(Thailand) Sinsamut Klinmee	ONE Fight Night 22	Bangkok, Thailand	KO (Body shots)	3	1:33
2023-12-08	Win	(Spain) Mouhcine Chafi	ONE Fight Night 17	Bangkok, Thailand	KO (Left hook)	1	1:59
2023-09-29	Win	(Thailand) Rungrawee Sitsongpeenong	ONE Fight Night 14	Bangkok, Thailand	TKO (3 Knockdowns)	1	2:41
2023-06-10	Loss	(Suriname) Regian Eersel	ONE Fight Night 11	Bangkok, Thailand	KO (Left hook)	1	0:46
For the ONE Lightweight Muay Thai World Championship.
2023-02-02	Win	(Iran) Mehran Mohammadnia	Muaythai Factory	Kemerovo, Russia	TKO (3 Knockdowns)	2	
2022-07-15	Win	(Russia) Maxim Sulgin	RCC Fair Fight 18	Yekaterinburg, Russia	Decision (Unanimous)	3	3:00
2022-02-05	Win	(Turkey) Ismail Uzuner	Muay Thai Factory 4	Kemerovo, Russia	Decision (unanimous)	3	3:00
2020-12-19	Win	(Russia) Maxim Sulgin	RCC 8	Yekaterinburg, Russia	Decision (Unanimous)	3	3:00
2019-10-12	Win	(Switzerland) Yoann Kongolo	Glory 69: Düsseldorf	Düsseldorf, Germany	TKO (Doctor stoppage)	2	2:59
2018-12-22	Win	(Brazil) Carlos Prates	Muay Thai Factory 1	Perm, Russia	Decision	3	3:00
2018-12-08	Win	(Netherlands) Robbie Hageman	Glory 62: Rotterdam	Rotterdam, Netherlands	TKO (Punches)	1	1:53
2018-10-20	Win	(France) Samuel Dbili	Glory 60: Lyon	Lyon, France	TKO (3 Knockdowns rule)	1	2:59
2018-09-06	Win	(Morocco) Аli Al Ameri	TATNEFT CUP	Kazan, Russia	KO (Knee to the body)	4	
2018-07-08	Win	(Russia) Vasiliy Semenov	Fair Fight V	Yekaterinburg, Russia	KO (Knees and Punches)	3	1:40
2018-06-27	Win	(Serbia) Ljubo Jalovi	TATNEFT CUP	Kazan, Russia	Ext.R Decision	4	
2017-12-14	Loss	(Uzbekistan) Sher Mamazulunov	TATNEFT CUP, -80 kg Tournament Final	Kazan, Russia	Ext.R Decision	4	
For the 2017 Tatneft Cup -80kg title.
2017-10-27	Win	(Russia) Surik Magakyan	TATNEFT CUP, -80 kg Tournament Semi Final	Kazan, Russia	TKO (Left Hook)	1	
2017-09-06	Win	(Moldova) Constantin Rusu	TATNEFT CUP, -80 kg Tournament Quarter Final	Kazan, Russia	TKO (Straight Right)	2	2:25
2017-06-27	Win	(Guinea-Bissau) Janilson da Cruz	TATNEFT CUP	Kazan, Russia	KO (Overhand Right)	1	0:15
Legend: Win Loss Draw/No contest Notes

Amateur Muay Thai Record
Date	Result	Opponent	Event	Location	Method	Round	Time
2022-03-23	Loss	(Russia) Salimsultan Aminov	2022 Russian Muaythai Championship, Tournament Quarterfinal	Ulan-Ude, Russia	Decision (Unanimous)	3	3:00
2015-11-05	Win	(Russia) Alexander Petrunin	2015 Russian Muaythai Championship, Tournament Semifinal	Ulan-Ude, Russia	Decision (Unanimous)	3	3:00
2015-11-04	Win	(Russia) Mairbek Midiev	2015 Russian Muaythai Championship, Tournament Quarterfinal	Ulan-Ude, Russia	Decision (Unanimous)	3	3:00
2014-03-16	Loss	(Russia) Vladimir Kuzmin	2014 Russian Cup	Russia	Decision	3	3:00
Legend: Win Loss Draw/No contest Notes

== See also ==
- List of male kickboxers
