= George Jarvis (Muay Thai) =

British Muay Thai fighter (born 2000)

- Born: 18 July 2000 (age 26); Crawley, England
- Nickname: G-Unit
- Height: 183 cm (6 ft 0 in)
- Weight: 77 kg (169.8 lb; 12.1 st)
- Style: Muay Thai
- Stance: Orthodox
- Fighting out of: London, England
- Team: Lumpini Crawley
- Years active: 2015 - Present

Kickboxing record
- Total: 34
- Wins: 29
- Losses: 5
- By knockout: 2
- Draws: 0

George Jarvis (born 18 July 2000) is a British professional Muay Thai fighter.

== Biography and career ==
=== Early career ===
Jarvis started training in Muay Thai at the age of four with his father who owns the Crawley Lumpini Gym.

On February 16, 2019, Jarvis travelled to the USA to faced Daniel Kim at Lion Fight 51. He won the fight by third round technical knockout.

On June 8, 2019, Jarvis defeated Marcel Adeyemi by unanimous decision at Muaythai Mayhem 33, winning the vacant WBC Muay Thai 168 lbs British title in the process.

On May 22, 2021, Jarvis faced Prince Owuh at the Victory 6 event. He won the fight by unanimous decision.

On July 3, 2021 Jarvis faced Mouhcine Chafi for the vacant WBC Muaythai European Middleweight title at Golden Fight in Barcelona, Spain. He lost the fight by unanimous decision.

On October 21, 2021, Jarvis faced Toni Romero for the Nai Kanom Tom challenge belt. He won the fight by unanimous decision.

Jarvis faced Damien Cazambo on February 12, 2022, for the vacant WBC Muaythai European Super Middleweight title. He won the fight by fifth round technical knockout.

=== WBC and ISKA World champion ===
Jarvis was scheduled to face Tobias Alexandersson at Muaythai Mayhem for the vacant WBC World Super Middleweight title. He won the fight by unanimous decision.

Jarvis was scheduled to face Dylan Meagher on June 23, 2023, for the vacant WBC Muaythai International Light Heavyweight title. He won the fight by unanimous decision.

=== ONE Championship ===
Jarvis made his ONE Friday Fights debut at ONE Friday Fights 35 in the Lumpinee Stadium against Chanajon P.K. Saenchai Muaythaigym. He lost the fight by split decision.

Jarvis faced Mustafa Al Tekreeti at ONE Friday Fights 51 on February 9, 2024. He won the fight by split decision.

On August 2, 2024, Jarvis faced Ricardo Bravo at ONE Friday Fights 73. He won the fight by unanimous decision.

On November 4, 2024, Jarvis faced Rungrawee Sitsongpeenong at ONE Friday Fights 85. He won by third round knockout and earned a performance bonus as well as a ONE Championship contract.

Jarvis rematched Mouhcine Chafi at ONE Fight Night 30 on April 5, 2025. He won the fight by unanimous decision after scoring knockdowns in the first and second round.

Jarvis challenged the ONE Lightweight Muay Thai champion, Regian Eersel, at ONE Fight Night 34, on August 2, 2025. He lost the fight via TKO in the first round, being knocked down twice in just under 90 seconds.

== Titles and accomplishments ==
- ONE Championship
  - Performance of the Night (vs. Rungrawee Sitsongpeenong)
- World Boxing Council Muaythai
  - 2019 WBC Muaythai English Middleweight (160 lbs) Champion
  - 2021 WBC Muaythai Nai Khanom Tom Challenge Winner
  - 2022 WBC Muaythai European Super Middleweight (168 lbs) Champion
  - 2022 WBC Muaythai World Super Middleweight (168 lbs) Champion
  - 2023 WBC Muaythai International Light Heavyweight (175 lbs) Champion
- International Sport Karate Association
  - 2022 ISKA Muay Thai World Super-middleweight (-78 kg) Champion
- Muay Thai Grand Prix
  - 2023 MTGP World -76.3 kg Champion

== Fight record ==
Professional Muay Thai record
29 Wins (9 (T)KO's), 5 Losses, 0 Draws
| Date | Result | Opponent | Event | Location | Method | Round | Time |
| 2026-10-02 | Loss | (Suriname) Regian Eersel | ONE The Inner Circle 33 | Bangkok, Thailand | KO (left hook) | 4 | 1:39 |
For the ONE Muay Thai World Lightweight title.
| 2026-06-27 | Win | (Thailand) Rungrawee Sitsongpeenong | ONE Fight Night 44 | Bangkok, Thailand | KO (Left hook) | 2 | 1:59 |
| 2026-03-13 | Win | (Thailand) Sinsamut Klinmee | ONE Fight Night 41 | Bangkok, Thailand | Decision (Unanimous) | 3 | 3:00 |
| 2025-08-02 | Loss | (Suriname) Regian Eersel | ONE Fight Night 34 | Bangkok, Thailand | TKO (Right cross) | 1 | 1:24 |
For the ONE Muay Thai Lightweight title.
| 2025-04-05 | Win | (Morocco) Mouhcine Chafi | ONE Fight Night 30, Lumpinee Stadium | Bangkok, Thailand | Decision (Unanimous) | 3 | 3:00 |
| 2024-11-01 | Win | (Thailand) Rungrawee Sitsongpeenong | ONE Friday Fights 85, Lumpinee Stadium | Bangkok, Thailand | KO (Elbow and punches) | 3 | 1:15 |
| 2024-08-02 | Win | (Argentina) Ricardo Bravo | ONE Friday Fights 73, Lumpinee Stadium | Bangkok, Thailand | Decision (Unanimous) | 3 | 3:00 |
| 2024-02-09 | Win | (Iraq) Mustafa Al Tekreeti | ONE Friday Fights 51, Lumpinee Stadium | Bangkok, Thailand | Decision (Split) | 3 | 3:00 |
| 2023-09-29 | Loss | (Thailand) Chanajon P.K. Saenchai Muaythaigym | ONE Friday Fights 35, Lumpinee Stadium | Bangkok, Thailand | Decision (Split) | 3 | 3:00 |
| 2023-06-23 | Win | (Republic of Ireland) Dylan Meagher | Siam Warriors Superfights | Cork, Ireland | Decision (Unanimous) | 5 | 3:00 |
Wins the vacant WBC Muaythai International Light Heavyweight (175 lbs) title.
| 2023-04-15 | Win | (France) Jérémy Antonio | MTGP - London | London, England | TKO (retirement) | 2 | 3:00 |
Wins the MTGP World 76.3 kg title.
| 2023-02-25 | Loss | (Scotland) George Mann | MTGP Australia | Perth, Australia | Decision (Unanimous) | 5 | 3:00 |
Loses the WBC Muaythai World Super Middleweight (168 lbs) title.
| 2022-10-22 | Win | (Spain) Nicolas Mendes | Muaythai Mayhem | Crawley, England | Decision (Unanimous) | 5 | 3:00 |
| 2022-06-25 | Win | (Belgium) Cedric De Keirsmaeker | Muaythai Mayhem | Crawley, England | Decision (Unanimous) | 5 | 3:00 |
Wins the vacant ISKA Muay Thai World Super-middleweight (-78 kg) title.
| 2022-04-09 | Win | (Sweden) Tobias Alexandersson | Muaythai Mayhem | Crawley, England | Decision (Unanimous) | 5 | 3:00 |
Wins the WBC Muaythai World Super Middleweight (168 lbs) title.
| 2022-02-12 | Win | (France) Damien Cazambo | Supershowdown | Bolton, England | TKO | 5 | 1:27 |
Wins the vacant WBC Muaythai European Super Middleweight (168 lbs) title.
| 2021-10-24 | Win | (Spain) Toni Romero | Siam Warriors Superfights | Cork, Ireland | Decision (Unanimous) | 5 | 3:00 |
Wins the WBC Muaythai Nai Khanom Tom Challenge belt.
| 2021-09-25 | Win | (United Kingdom) Vitor Chagas | Muaythai Mayhem | Crawley, England | KO (Left hook to the body) | 1 | 1:20 |
| 2021-07-03 | Loss | (Spain) Mouhcine Chafi | Golden League | Barcelona, Spain | Decision (Unanimous) | 5 | 3:00 |
For the vacant WBC Muaythai European Middleweight (160 lbs) title.
| 2021-05-22 | Win | (United Kingdom) Prince Owuh | Victory 6 | England | Decision (Unanimous) | 5 | 3:00 |
| 2019-11-03 | Win | (Italy) Saro Presti | MuayThai Mayhem | Copthorne, England | Decision (Unanimous) | 5 | 3:00 |
| 2019-06-08 | Win | (United Kingdom) Marcel Adeyemi | MuayThai Mayhem 33 | Copthorne, England | Decision (Unanimous) | 5 | 3:00 |
Wins the WBC Muaythai English Middleweight (160 lbs) title.
| 2019-03-23 | Win | (Spain) Jesús Cartucho | Super Cup 2019 | Chiclana de la Frontera, Spain | | | |
| 2019-02-16 | Win | (United States) Daniel Kim | Lion Fight 51 | Los Angeles, USA | TKO | 3 | 1:46 |
| 2018-11-03 | Win | (Cyprus) Sotiris Christodoulou | MuayThai Mayhem | Crawley, England | TKO | | |
| 2018-05-26 | Loss | (United Kingdom) Jake Purdy | MuayThai Mayhem | Copthorne, England | Decision (Unanimous) | 5 | 3:00 |
For the vacant UKMF British (72.5 kg) title.
| 2018-04-07 | Win | (France) Gael Lubaisha | Muay Thai Grand Prix 15 - Lion Fight 41 | London, England | Decision (Unanimous) | 3 | 3:00 |
| 2017-11-18 | Win | (Portugal) Diogo Cardoso | MuayThai Mayhem | Copthorne, England | Decision (Unanimous) | 5 | 3:00 |
| 2017-09-03 | Win | (United Kingdom) Mangirdas Kuklierius | Road to Mayhem - Extreme Fight Series | Crawley, England | Decision | | |
| 2017-04-22 | Win | (Italy) Pasquale Amoroso | MuayThai Mayhem | Copthorne, England | Decision (Unanimous) | 3 | 3:00 |
| 2017-03-12 | Win | (Portugal) Ruben Pereira | Extreme Fight Series | Crawley, England | | | |
| 2016-11-19 | Win | (Italy) Daniel Iodice | MuayThai Mayhem | Copthorne, England | | | |
Legend: Win Loss Draw/No contest Notes

== See also ==
- List of male kickboxers
