= Beybulat Isaev =

Russian kickboxer (born 1994)

- Born: Beybulat Imlutdinovich Isaev; May 3, 1994 (age 32); Surgut, Russia
- Native name: Бейбулат Ильмутдинович Исаев
- Nationality: Russian
- Height: 1.90 m (6 ft 3 in)
- Weight: 102 kg (225 lb; 16.1 st)
- Style: Muay Thai, kickboxing
- Stance: Orthodox
- Fighting out of: Surgut, Russia
- Team: Fight Club NORD 86
- Years active: 2012 - present

Kickboxing record
- Total: 31
- Wins: 25
- By knockout: 10
- Losses: 6
- By knockout: 2

Beybulat Isaev (born May 3, 1994) is a Russian kickboxer, Muay Thai fighter and mixed martial artist. He is the reigning WMC World Super Heavyweight champion.

== Career ==
Isaev began training in martial arts at the age of 11 before discovering Muay Thai in 2011 at the Nord-86 gym.

On August 5, 2018, Isaev faced Alexander Grinchuk at ACB-KB 17. He lost the fight by decision.

On December 22, 2018, Isaev defeated Seymon Shelepov by knockout in the second round at Muaythai Factory in Perm, Russia.

Isaev made his ONE Championship debut against Anderson Silva at ONE Championship: Immortal Triumph on September 6, 2019. He lost the fight by a first-round knockout. Isaev faced Mihajlo Kecojevic at ONE Championship: Unbreakable 2 on January 29, 2021. He won the fight by a first-round knockout. He received the ORION award for best knockout of the year among Russian competitors.

Isaev faced Valeriy Bizyaev at Fair Fight XIV on March 6, 2021. He won the fight by a first-round knockout.

Isaev returned to ONE Championship to face Bogdan Stoica at ONE Championship: NextGen on October 29, 2021. He won the fight by unanimous decision. Isaev made his next ONE appearance against Giannis Stoforidis at ONE: Heavy Hitters on January 14, 2022. He lost the fight by a first-round knockout 31 seconds into the first round, after an exchange of left hooks sent both fighters down.

Isaev faced the one-time Glory Light Heavyweight title challenger Ariel Machado at Muaythai Factory on February 2, 2023. He won the fight by unanimous decision.

Isaev faced Yuri Farcas at ONE Fight Night 18 on January 13, 2024. He won the fight by unanimous decision.

== Titles and accomplishments ==
=== Professional ===
- World Muaythai Council
  - 2012 WMC World Cruiserweight Championship
  - 2025 WMC World Super Heavyweight Championship

=== Amateur ===
- International Federation of Muaythai Associations
  - 2011 IFMA European Championships Junior -86 kg (silver)
  - 2012 IFMA European Championships Junior -86 kg (gold)
  - 2016 IFMA World Championships B-class -86 kg (gold)

Awards

- 2021 ORION awards Knockout of the Year (vs. Mihajlo Kecojevic)

== Mixed martial arts record ==
Professional record breakdown
1 match	1 win	0 losses
By knockout	1	0

Res.	Record	Opponent	Method	Event	Date	Round	Time	Location	Notes
Win	1–0	Damir Russinov	KO (head kick)	Naiza FC 69	November 23, 2024	1	3:12	Almaty, Kazakhstan	Heavyweight debut.

== Kickboxing and Muay Thai record ==
Professional Muay Thai and kickboxing record
25 wins (10 (T)KOs), 6 losses, 0 draws, 0 no contests
Date	Result	Opponent	Event	Location	Method	Round	Time
2025-10-16	Win	(Egypt) Ibrahim Elsawy	Muaythai Friendship Cup	Moscow, Russia	KO (knee to the body)	2	
Wins the vacant WMC World Super Heavyweight title.
2024-07-26	Win	(Australia) Alex Roberts	ONE Friday Fights 72	Bangkok, Thailand	TKO (injury)	1	0:33
2024-01-13	Win	(Romania) Yuri Farcaș	ONE Fight Night 18	Bangkok, Thailand	Decision (unanimous)	3	3:00
2023-02-02	Win	(Brazil) Ariel Machado	Muaythai Factory	Kemerovo, Russia	Decision (unanimous)	3	3:00
2022-01-14	Loss	(Greece) Giannis Stoforidis	ONE: Heavy Hitters	Kallang, Singapore	KO (left hook)	1	0:31
2021-10-29	Win	(Romania) Bogdan Stoica	ONE Championship: NextGen	Kallang, Singapore	Decision (unanimous)	3	3:00
2021-03-06	Win	(Russia) Valeriy Bizyaev	Fair Fight XIV	Yekaterinburg, Russia	KO (head kick)	1	2:30
2021-01-29	Win	(Serbia) Mihajlo Kecojevic	ONE Championship: Unbreakable 2	Kallang, Singapore	KO (right hook)	1	1:22
2019-09-06	Loss	(Brazil) Anderson Silva	ONE Championship: Immortal Triumph	Ho Chi Minh City, Vietnam	TKO (punches)	1	2:19
2019-04-21	Loss	(Latvia) Artur Gorlov	Fair Fight VIII	Yekaterinburg, Russia	Ext.R decision	4	3:00
2018-12-22	Win	(Russia) Seymon Shelepov	Muaythai Factory	Perm, Russia	KO (spinning back fist)	2	
2018-08-05	Loss	(Russia) Alexander Grinchuk	ACB-KB 17	Pskov, Russia	Decision	3	3:00
2018-02-04	Win	(China) Wu Chao	Kunlun Fight 69	Guiyang, China	KO (punch)	1	2:41
2017-09-24	Win	(Russia) Sergey Trifonov	Russian Challenge 4	Russia	Decision (unanimous)	3	3:00
2017-07-15	Win	(China) Hao Guanghua	Wu Lin Feng 2017: Russia VS China & ACB KB 10	Yekaterinburg, Russia	Decision (unanimous)	3	3:00
2017-03-29	Win	(Russia) Islam Kumykov	Russian Challenge 3	Nalchik, Russia	KO	1	
2012-12-05	Win	(Thailand) Salatun	Phetchbuncha Stadium	Ko Samui, Thailand	KO (punches)		
Wins the WMC World Cruiserweight title.
2012-09-22	Win	(Thailand) Salatun	Phetchbuncha Stadium	Ko Samui, Thailand	KO (left hook)	2	
Legend: Win Loss Draw/No contest Notes

Amateur Muay Thai and Kickboxing record
Date	Result	Opponent	Event	Location	Method	Round	Time
2016-05-	Win	(Germany) Frederic Fraikin	2016 IFMA World Championships, Final	Jönköping, Sweden	Decision (30:27)	3	3:00
Wins 2016 IFMA World Championships B-class -86kg Gold Medal.
2016-05-	Win	(Turkey) Selman Yucel	2016 IFMA World Championships, Semi Finals	Jönköping, Sweden	TKO	1	
2016-05-	Win	(Turkmenistan) Rusul Rasulov	2016 IFMA World Championships, Quarter Finals	Jönköping, Sweden	TKO	1	
2011-04-28	Loss	(Ukraine) Ivan Gorgulya	2011 IFMA European Championships, Final	Antalya, Turkey	Decision (30:27)	3	3:00
Wins 2011 IFMA European Championship Junior -86kg Silver Medal.
Legend: Win Loss Draw/no contest Notes

== See also ==
- List of male kickboxers
