= ONE Fight Night 18 =

Combat sport events in 2024

ONE Fight Night 18: Gasanov vs. Oh
- The poster for ONE Fight Night 18: Gasanov vs. Oh
- Promotion: ONE Championship
- Date: January 13, 2024
- Venue: Lumpinee Boxing Stadium
- City: Bangkok, Thailand

Event chronology
| ONE Friday Fights 47: Suakim vs. Balyko | ONE Fight Night 18: Gasanov vs. Oh | ONE Friday Fights 48: Kongthoranee vs. Mazoriev |

ONE Fight Night 18: Gasanov vs. Oh was a combat sport event produced by ONE Championship that took place on January 13, 2024, at Lumpinee Boxing Stadium in Bangkok, Thailand.

== Background ==
A ONE Flyweight Kickboxing World Championship bout between current champion Superlek Kiatmuu9 and Elias Mahmoudi was expected to headline the event. However, Mahmoudi withdrew from the bout due to rib injury. Superlek was instead to face former three-divisions K-1 World Champion Takeru Segawa at ONE 165 on January 28. As a result, a featherweight bout between Shamil Gasanov and Oh Ho-taek was promoted to main event status.

A bantamweight Muay Thai bout between former ONE Bantamweight Champion John Lineker, who making his Muay Thai debut against Liam Harrison was scheduled for this event. However, Harrison suffered a knee injury and the bout was scrapped.

== Results ==
Fight card (Amazon Prime Video)
| Weight class | | | | Method | Round | Time | Notes |
|---|---|---|---|---|---|---|---|
| Featherweight | Shamil Gasanov | def. | Oh Ho-taek | Decision (unanimous) | 3 | 5:00 |
| Bantamweight Muay Thai | Suablack Tor.Pran49 | def. | István Ștefan Kóródi | Decision (unanimous) | 3 | 3:00 |
| Bantamweight | Kwon Won-il | def. | Shinechagtga Zoltsetseg | TKO (elbows) | 2 | 2:40 |
| Lightweight Muay Thai | Rungrawee Sitsongpeenong | def. | Shakir Al-Tekreeti | TKO (elbow and knee) | 2 | 1:44 |
| Bantamweight | Artem Belakh | def. | Enkh-Orgil Baatarkhuu | TKO (knee and punches) | 2 | 4:55 |
| Lightweight Muay Thai | Liam Nolan | def. | Ali Aliev | Decision (unanimous) | 3 | 3:00 |
| Heavyweight | Kang Ji-won | def. | Mikhail Jamal Abdul-Latif | TKO (knee and punches) | 2 | 4:09 |
| Light Heavyweight Kickboxing | Beybulat Isaev | def. | Yuri Farcaș | Decision (unanimous) | 3 | 3:00 |
| Bantamweight | Ibragim Dauev | def. | Mark Abelardo | Decision (unanimous) | 3 | 5:00 |

== Bonus awards ==
The following fighters received $50,000 bonuses.

- Performance of the Night: Kwon Won-il and Rungrawee Sitsongpeenong

== See also ==
- 2024 in ONE Championship
- List of ONE Championship events
- List of current ONE fighters
