= Florent Kaouachi =

French kickboxer (born 1988)

- Born: Florent Kaouachi; 9 June 1988 (age 38); Paris, France
- Height: 6 ft 5 in (196 cm)
- Weight: 93.9 kg (207 lb; 14 st 11 lb)
- Division: Heavyweight; Light heavyweight
- Style: Kickboxing
- Stance: Orthodox
- Fighting out of: Bonneuil-sur-Marne, Paris, France
- Team: Mahmoudi Gym
- Trainer: Nordine Mahmoudi
- Years active: 2013-present

Kickboxing record
- Total: 21
- Wins: 16
- By knockout: 9
- Losses: 3
- Draws: 1
- No contests: 1

Florent Kaouachi (born 9 June 1988) is a French Muay Thai kickboxer. He is the current ISKA World Super Cruiserweight and former Cruiserweight K-1 champion.

== Kickboxing career ==
Florent Kaouachi made his professional debut against Emmanuel Ulrich at Muay Thai Combat Mania on November 15, 2013, and won the fight by unanimous decision. He was next scheduled to face Jean-Patrick Capron at Fight Night on December 13, 2013, and won by a fifth-round technical knockout. In his third professional bout, Kaouachi was scheduled to fight Sébastien Laplane for the FDMA National 201 lbs title at Tiger's Thai Fight on June 7, 2014. He won the fight by a first-round technical knockout.

Kaouachi fought Ludovice Providence at Battle 974 on July 26, 2014, and won the fight by a first-round technical knockout. Kaouachi was next scheduled to face Eren Kara at Rond Kok Batay 6 on October 31, 2015, whom he beat by a second-round technical knockout. Kaouachi was scheduled to fight Goye Mohaman for the ISKA Intercontinental Super Cruiserweight Title at K1 Event 9 on November 19, 2016. He won the fight by a fourth-round technical knockout.

Kaouachi participated in a four man tournament, held at K1 Event 10 on February 11, 2017, which was organized to crown the ISKA European Super Cruiserweight K-1 champion. He beat Tomy Blanco by unanimous decision in the semifinals, and Fabien Fouquet by a second-round technical knockout in the finals.

Kaouachi fought Ismael El Brouzini for the ISKA World Cruiserweight K-1 title at K1 Event VIP 3 on April 29, 2017. He won the fight by unanimous decision.

Kaouachi made his Glory debut against Abdarhmane Coulibaly at Glory 47: Lyon on October 28, 2017. He suffered his first professional loss, dropping a split decision to Coulibaly. Kaouachi fought outside of France for the first time in his next fight, being scheduled to face Pavel Voronin at KOK 53 on December 9, 2017, in Chișinău, Moldova. The fight was ruled a draw.

Kaouachi was scheduled to fight Cristian Ristea for the vacant ISKA World Super Cruiserweight K-1 championship at K1 Event 11 on February 24, 2018. He won the fight by a fourth-round technical knockout.

Kaouachi was scheduled to face Ahmed Karoucha at Xtreme Fight Dionysien on June 16, 2018. He won the fight by unanimous decision.

Kaouachi made his ONE Championship debut against Sergei Maslobojev at One Championship: Pursuit of Power on July 13, 2018. Maslobojev won the fight by unanimous decision.

Kaouachi was scheduled to face Valeriy Bizyaev at Tatneft Cup on June 11, 2019. He lost the fight by unanimous decision. Kaouachi rematched Tomy Blanco at BLR Fight Sauvagerie 5 on November 30, 2019. He won the fight by unanimous decision.

Kaouachi was scheduled to face Sunday Asibor K-1 Event 14 on December 4, 2021, following a two-year layoff from the sport. He won the fight by decision.

Kaouachi was booked to face Kambiz Abdollahi at Cicada Fight Championship on May 21, 2022, in Dubai, United Arab Emirates, his first fight outside of France.

Kaouachi made his second appearance under the Glory banner against Luis Tavares at Glory Rivals 2 on June 11, 2022. He lost the fight by a third-round knockout. The result was overturned to a no contest on November 24, as Tavares tested positive for a banned substance.

After suffering his second loss under the Glory banner, Kaouachi was expected to face Mimoun Jazouli at K-1 Event Gold Edition on July 2, 2022. This fight was later cancelled, and Kaouachi was instead booked to make a ISKA World Cruiserweight K-1 title defense against Adam Krzysztof at BLR Fight 6 on November 26, 2022. He retained the title by unanimous decision.

Kaouachi faced Mamadou Keita at Super Fight 976 on July 22, 2023. He won the fight by unanimous decision.

== Championships and accomplishments ==
=== Kickboxing ===
- International Sport Karate Association
  - ISKA World K-1 Super Cruiserweight (-95 kg) Championship
  - ISKA World K-1 Cruiserweight (-88.5 kg) Championship
  - ISKA Intercontinental K-1 Super Cruiserweight (-95 kg) Championship
  - ISKA European K-1 Super Cruiserweight (-95 kg) Championship

=== Muay Thai ===
- Fédération de Muaythaï et Disciplines Associées
  - FDMA National 201 lbs Championship
- International Federation of Muaythai Associations
  - (silver) 2014 IFMA European Championships (-91 kg)
- World Muaythai Federation
  - (gold) 2016 WMF World Championships (-91 kg)

== Fight record ==
Kickboxing record
16 Wins (9 KOs), 3 Losses, 1 Draw, 1 No Contest
Date	Result	Opponent	Event	Location	Method	Round	Time	Record
2023-07-22	Win	(France) Mamadou Keita	Super Fight 976	Mayotte, France	Decision (Unanimous)	3	3:00	16–3–1 (1)
2022-11-26	Win	(Poland) Adam Kosut	BLR Fight 6	Saint-Denis, Réunion	Decision (Unanimous)	5	3:00	15–3–1 (1)
Defends the ISKA World Super Cruiserweight (-95 kg) K-1 Championship.
2022-06-11	NC	(Netherlands) Luis Tavares	Glory Rivals 1	Alkmaar, Netherlands	KO (Left hook)	3	0:27	14–3–1 (1)
Originally a KO win for Tavares, changed to a no contest after he tested positive for a banned substance.
2021-12-04	Win	(Nigeria) Sunday Asibor	K-1 Event 14, Tournament Reserve Fight	Troyes, France	Decision	3	3:00	14–3–1
2019-11-30	Win	(France) Tomy Blanco	BLR Fight Sauvagerie 5	Reunion, France	Decision (Unanimous)	3	3:00	13–3–1
2019-06-11	Loss	(Russia) Valeriy Bizyaev	Tatneft Cup	Kazan, Russia	Decision (Unanimous)	3	3:00	12–3–1
2018-07-13	Loss	(Lithuania) Sergej Maslobojev	One Championship: Pursuit of Power	Kuala Lumpur, Malaysia	Decision (Unanimous)	3	3:00	12–2–1
2018-06-16	Win	(Spain) Ahmed Karoucha	Xtreme Fight Dionysien	Reunion, France	Decision (Unanimous)	3	3:00	12–1–1
2018-02-24	Win	(Romania) Cristian Ristea	K1 Event 11	Troyes, France	TKO	4	3:00	11–1–1
Wins the vacant ISKA World Super Cruiserweight (-95 kg) K-1 Championship.
2017-12-09	Draw	(Moldova) Pavel Voronin	KOK 53	Chișinău, Moldova	Decision	3	3:00	10–1–1
2017-10-28	Loss	(France) Abdarhmane Coulibaly	Glory 47: Lyon	Lyon, France	Decision (Split)	3	3:00	10–1
2017-04-29	Win	(Morocco) Ismael El Brouzini	K1 Event VIP 3	Troyes, France	Decision (Unanimous)	3	3:00	10–0
Wins the ISKA World Cruiserweight (-88.5 kg) K-1 Championship.
2017-04-07	Win	(France) Mickael Yapi	Fight Night 1	Saint-Étienne, France	Decision (Unanimous)	3	3:00	9–0
2017-02-11	Win	(France) Fabien Fouquet	K1 Event 10, Tournament Final	Troyes, France	TKO	2	3:00	8–0
Wins the ISKA European Super Cruiserweight (-95 kg) K-1 Championship.
2017-02-11	Win	(France) Tomy Blanco	K1 Event 10, Tournament Semifinal	Troyes, France	Decision (Unanimous)	2	3:00	7–0
2016-11-19	Win	(Cameroon) Goye Mohaman	K1 Event 9	Troyes, France	TKO	4	3:00	6–0
Wins the ISKA Intercontinental Super Cruiserweight (-95 kg) K-1 Championship.
2015-10-31	Win	(France) Eren Kara	Rond Kok Batay 6	Sainte-Marie, Martinique	TKO	2	3:00	5–0
2014-07-26	Win	(France) Ludovice Providence	Battle 974	Réunion, France	TKO	1	3:00	4–0
2014-06-07	Win	(France) Sébastien Laplane	Tiger's Thai Fight	Le Pradet, France	TKO	1	3:00	3–0
Wins the FDMA National 201 lbs Championship.
2013-12-13	Win	(France) Jean-Patrick Capron	Fight Night	Réunion, France	TKO	5	3:00	2–0
2013-11-15	Win	(France) Emmanuel Ulrich	Muay Thai Combat Mania	Pattaya, Thailand	Decision (Unanimous)	3	3:00	1–0
Legend: Win Loss Draw/No contest Notes

Amateur Muay Thai Record
Date	Result	Opponent	Event	Location	Method	Round	Time
2016-03-22	Win	(Brazil)	2016 WMF World Championships, Tournament Final	Bangkok, Thailand	Decision	3	2:00
Wins 2016 WMF World Championships -91kg Gold Medal.
2014-09	Loss	(Poland) Arkadiusz Wrzosek	2014 IFMA European Championships, Tournament Final	Poland	TKO (Injury)	2	2:00
Wins 2014 IFMA European Championships -91kg Silver Medal.
2014-09	Win	(Slovenia) Robert Grguric	2014 IFMA European Championships, Tournament Semifinal	Poland	KO (Left hook)	1	1:30
2014-03-30	Win	(France) Jason Quitusia	2014 FDMA IFMA Qualifiers, Tournament Final	Paris, France	Decision	3	2:00
Qualifies for the 2014 IFMA European Championships.
2013-09-07	Win	(Mauritius) Robert Sylvert	Millennium Team Fight	Paris, France	TKO (Retirement)	1	3:00
Legend: Win Loss Draw/No contest Notes

== See also ==
- List of male kickboxers
