= Sitsongpeenong =

Sitsongpeenong is a Muay Thai gym in Bangkok, Thailand.

== Fighters ==
The gym is home to several notable fighters, who use the gym's name as their ring name. They include:

- Kem Sitsongpeenong (born 1984)
- Manaowan Sitsongpeenong (born 1996)
- Sitthichai Sitsongpeenong (born 1991)
- Thongchai Sitsongpeenong (born 1996)
- Yodpayak Sitsongpeenong (born 1993)
