= ONE Fight Night 21 =

Combat sport events in 2024

ONE Fight Night 21: Eersel vs. Nicolas
- The poster for ONE Fight Night 21: Eersel vs. Nicolas
- Promotion: ONE Championship
- Date: April 6, 2024
- Venue: Lumpinee Boxing Stadium
- City: Bangkok, Thailand

Event chronology
ONE Friday Fights 58: Superbon vs. Grigorian 2	ONE Fight Night 21: Eersel vs. Nicolas	ONE Friday Fights 59: Yamin vs. Ouraghi

ONE Fight Night 21: Eersel vs. Nicolas was a combat sport event produced by ONE Championship that took place on April 6, 2024, at Lumpinee Boxing Stadium in Bangkok, Thailand.

== Background ==
A ONE Lightweight Kickboxing World Championship bout between current champion (also current ONE Lightweight Muay Thai World Champion) Regian Eersel and Alexis Nicolas headlined the event.

A ONE Welterweight Submission Grappling World Championship bout between current champion Tye Ruotolo and Izaak Michell took place at the co-main event. The bout was originally scheduled at ONE 166 on March 1, but the bout moved at this event for unknown reason.

== Results ==
Fight card (Amazon Prime Video)
Weight class				Method	Round	Time	Notes
Lightweight Kickboxing	Alexis Nicolas	def.	Regian Eersel (c)	Decision (unanimous)	5	3:00	(Note: For the ONE Lightweight Kickboxing World Championship.)
Welterweight Submission Grappling	Tye Ruotolo (c)	def.	Izaak Michell	Submission (rear-naked choke)	1	4:43	(Note: For the ONE Welterweight Submission Grappling World Championship.)
Bantamweight Muay Thai	Suablack Tor.Pran49	def.	Vladimir Kuzmin	Decision (unanimous)	3	3:00	(Note: Kuzmin missed weight (146.5 lb).)
Heavyweight	Ben Tynan	vs.	Duke Didier	NC (overturned)	1	2:36	(Note: Originally a TKO (punches) win for Tynan; overturned after he tested positive for banned substances.)
Flyweight Muay Thai	Denis Purić	def.	Jacob Smith	Decision (unanimous)	3	3:00
Catchweight (180 lb) Submission Grappling	Kade Ruotolo	def.	Francisco Lo	Submission (rear-naked choke)	1	4:48
Flyweight Kickboxing	Dedduanglek Tded99	def.	Taiki Naito	Decision (unanimous)	3	3:00	(Note: Dedduanglek missed weight (136 lb).)
Welterweight	Hiroyuki Tetsuka	def.	Valmir da Silva	Submission (north-south choke)	2	3:34
Strawweight Muay Thai	Songchainoi Kiatsongrit	def.	Nicolas Leite Silva	Decision (unanimous)	3	5:00	(Note: Originally a 116 pounds, but both fighters missed weight: Songchainoi (120.25 lb) and Leite Silva (125 lb).)
Bantamweight	Jeremy Pacatiw	def.	Wang Shuo	Submission (rear-naked choke)	1	2:07

== Bonus awards ==
The following fighters received $50,000 bonuses.

- Performance of the Night: Tye Ruotolo, Kade Ruotolo and Ben Tynan

== See also ==
- 2024 in ONE Championship
- List of ONE Championship events
- List of current ONE fighters
- ONE Championship Rankings
